= Lists of professional wrestling personnel =

This is an incomplete list of professional wrestlers, commentators, managers, road agents, and other workers associated with professional wrestling categorized by the promotion with which the wrestlers are mainly associated.

== List ==
Country	Promotion	Founded	Current personnel	Former personnel
United States	4th Rope Wrestling	2024	Current personnel	Former personnel
Japan	Active Advance Pro Wrestling	2002	Current personnel	Former personnel
Japan	Actwres girl'Z	2015	Current personnel	Former personnel
South Africa	Africa Wrestling Alliance	1995	Current personnel	Former personnel
United States	All Elite Wrestling	2019	Current personnel	Former personnel
Japan	All Japan Pro Wrestling	1972	Current personnel	Former personnel
Japan	All Japan Women's Pro Wrestling	1968–2005	Current personnel	Former personnel
United States	All Pro Wrestling	1991–2023	Current personnel	Former personnel
Israel	All Wrestling Organization	2012–2023	Current personnel	Former personnel
United States	American Wrestling Association	1960–1991	Current personnel	Former personnel
United States	American Wrestling Federation	1994–1996	Current personnel	Former personnel
Japan	Apache Pro-Wrestling Army	2004–2016	Current personnel	Former personnel
Japan	Arsion	1997–2003	Current personnel	Former personnel
Japan	Battlarts	1996–2011	Current personnel	Former personnel
England	Bellatrix Female Warriors	2005	Current personnel	Former personnel
Japan	Big Japan Pro Wrestling	1995	Current personnel	Former personnel
Canada	Border City Wrestling	1993	Current personnel	Former personnel
Brazil	Brazilian Wrestling Federation	2002	Current personnel	Former personnel
Canada	BSE Pro	2005–2010	Current personnel	Former personnel
Germany	Catch Wrestling Association	1973–1999	Current personnel	Former personnel
United States	Heart of America Sports Attractions	1948–1989	Current personnel	Former personnel
United States	Championship Wrestling from Hollywood	2010	Current personnel	Former personnel
United States	Combat Zone Wrestling	1999	Current personnel	Former personnel
Mexico	Consejo Mundial de Lucha Libre	1933	Current personnel	Former personnel
United States	Continental Championship Wrestling	1954–1989	Current personnel	Former personnel
United States	Continental Wrestling Association	1977–1989	Current personnel	Former personnel
Japan	DDT Pro-Wrestling	1997	Current personnel	Former personnel
USA	Deadlock Pro-Wrestling	2021–2026	Current personnel	Former personnel
Japan	Diamond Ring	2005–2014	Current personnel	Former personnel
New Zealand	Dominion Wrestling Union	1929–1962	Current personnel	Former personnel
Japan	Dradition	2008	Current personnel	Former personnel
Japan	Dragon Gate	2004	Current personnel	Former personnel
Japan	Dream Star Fighting Marigold	2024	Current personnel	Former personnel
Canada	Eastern Sports Association	1969–1976	Current personnel	Former personnel
Canada	Elite Canadian Championship Wrestling	1996–2020	Current personnel	Former personnel
United States	Evolve	2010–2020	Current personnel	Former personnel
Australia	Explosive Pro Wrestling	2001	Current personnel	Former personnel
United States	Extreme Championship Wrestling	1992–2001	Current personnel	Former personnel
United States	Extreme Rising	2012–2014	Current personnel	Former personnel
Ireland	Fight Factory Pro Wrestling	2004	Current personnel	Former personnel
Philippines	Filipino Pro Wrestling	2022	Current personnel	Former personnel
United States	Florida Championship Wrestling	2007–2012	Current personnel	Former personnel
Japan	Frontier Martial-Arts Wrestling	1989–2002, 2015–2018, 2021	Current personnel	Former personnel
England	Frontier Wrestling Alliance	1999–2012	Current personnel	Former personnel
United States	Future of Wrestling	1998–2003, 2011	Current personnel	Former personnel
Japan	Gaea Japan	1995–2005	Current personnel	Former personnel
United States	Game Changer Wrestling	1999–2004, 2013	Current personnel	Former personnel
Japan	Ganbare☆Pro-Wrestling	2013	Current personnel	Former personnel
Japan	Gatoh Move Pro Wrestling	2012	Current personnel	Former personnel
Japan	Gleat	2020	Current personnel	Former personnel
United States	Global Force Wrestling	2014–2018	Current personnel	Former personnel
United States	Global Wrestling Federation	1991–1994	Current personnel	Former personnel
Canada	Grand Prix Wrestling	1960–2023	Current personnel	Former personnel
Canada	Great Canadian Wrestling	2005	Current personnel	Former personnel
Canada	Hart Legacy Wrestling	2013	Current personnel	Former personnel
Canada	High Impact Wrestling Canada	1998–2019	Current personnel	Former personnel
Japan	Hustle	2004–2009	Current personnel	Former personnel
Japan	Ice Ribbon	2006	Current personnel	Former personnel
New Zealand	Impact Pro Wrestling	2003	Current personnel	Former personnel
United States	Independent Professional Wrestling Alliance	1995–2001	Current personnel	Former personnel
United States	Innovate Wrestling	2004	Current personnel	Former personnel
Japan	Inoki Genome Federation	2007–2019	Current personnel	Former personnel
Scotland	Insane Championship Wrestling	2006	Current personnel	Former personnel
United States	International World Class Championship Wrestling	1984–1996	Current personnel	Former personnel
Canada	International Wrestling Alliance	1973–2000	Current personnel	Former personnel
United States	International Wrestling Association	1975–1978	Current personnel	Former personnel
Puerto Rico	International Wrestling Association	1994	Current personnel	Former personnel
Japan	International Wrestling Association of Japan	1994–2014	Current personnel	Former personnel
Japan	International Wrestling Enterprise	1966–1981	Current personnel	Former personnel
Mexico	International Wrestling Revolution Group	1996	Current personnel	Former personnel
Canada	International Wrestling Syndicate	1998	Current personnel	Former personnel
Ireland	Irish Whip Wrestling	2002–2022	Current personnel	Former personnel
Israel	Israeli Pro Wrestling Association	2003	Current personnel	Former personnel
Japan	Japan Pro-Wrestling	1984–1987	Current personnel	Former personnel
Japan	Japan Women's Pro-Wrestling	1986–1992	Current personnel	Former personnel
Japan	Japan Wrestling Association	1953–1973	Current personnel	Former personnel
Japan	JDStar	1995–2007	Current personnel	Former personnel
United States	Jim Crockett Promotions	1931–1993	Current personnel	Former personnel
United States	Juggalo Championship Wrestling	1999	Current personnel	Former personnel
Japan	JWP Joshi Puroresu	1992–2017	Current personnel	Former personnel
United States	Keystone State Wrestling Alliance	2000	Current personnel	Former personnel
Japan	Kyushu Pro-Wrestling	2007	Current personnel	Former personnel
Puerto Rico	La Liga Wrestling	2012–2022	Current personnel	Former personnel
Mexico	Lucha Libre AAA Worldwide	1992	Current personnel	Former personnel
United States	Lucha Underground	2014–2018	Current personnel	Former personnel
Canada	Lutte Internationale	1980–1987	Current personnel	Former personnel
United States	Major League Wrestling	2002–2004, 2017	Current personnel	Former personnel
Philippines	Manila Wrestling Federation	2014–2024	Current personnel	Former personnel
Japan	Marvelous That's Women Pro Wrestling	2014	Current personnel	Former personnel
Canada	Maple Leaf Pro Wrestling	2024	Current personnel	Former personnel
Canada	Maximum Pro Wrestling	2010–2012	Current personnel	Former personnel
Australia	Melbourne City Wrestling	2010	Current personnel	Former personnel
Japan	Michinoku Pro Wrestling	1992	Current personnel	Former personnel
United States	Mid-Eastern Wrestling Federation	1991–2004	Current personnel	Former personnel
United States	National Wrestling Alliance	1948	Current personnel	Former personnel
United States	National Wrestling Federation	1970–1974, 1986–1994	Current personnel	Former personnel
Canada	Femmes Fatales	2009	Current personnel	Former personnel
Japan	NEO Japan Ladies Pro-Wrestling	1997–2010	Current personnel	Former personnel
Japan	New Japan Pro-Wrestling	1972	Current personnel	Former personnel
New Zealand	New Zealand Wide Pro Wrestling	2003	Current personnel	Former personnel
Canada	Northern Championship Wrestling	1986	Current personnel	Former personnel
Canada	Vancouver All-Star Wrestling	1960–1989	Current personnel	Former personnel
United States	Ohio Valley Wrestling	1997	Current personnel	Former personnel
United States	OMEGA Championship Wrestling	1997–1999, 2013	Current personnel	Former personnel
England	One Pro Wrestling	2005–2023	Current personnel	Former personnel
China	Oriental Wrestling Entertainment	2017–2021	Current personnel	Former personnel
Japan	Osaka Pro Wrestling	1999	Current personnel	Former personnel
Ireland	Over the Top Wrestling	2014	Current personnel	Former personnel
Japan	Oz Academy	1998	Current personnel	Former personnel
United States	Pacific Northwest Wrestling	1925	Current personnel	Former personnel
Philippines	Philippine Wrestling Revolution	2013–2022	Current personnel	Former personnel
Mexico	Perros del Mal	2007	Current personnel	Former personnel
United States	Phoenix Championship Wrestling	2001–2003	Current personnel	Former personnel
United States	Power League Wrestling	1991–2016	Current personnel	Former personnel
United States	Power Pro Wrestling	1998–2001	Current personnel	Former personnel
Canada	Prairie Wrestling Alliance	2001–2022	Current personnel	Former personnel
United States	Pro-Pain Pro Wrestling	2002–2005	Current personnel	Former personnel
England	Pro-Wrestling: EVE	2010	Current personnel	Former personnel
United States	Pro Wrestling America	1985	Current personnel	Former personnel
Japan	Pro-Wrestling Basara	2015	Current personnel	Former personnel
Japan	Pro Wrestling Freedoms	2009	Current personnel	Former personnel
Japan	Pro Wrestling Fujiwara Gumi	1991–1996	Current personnel	Former personnel
United States	Pro Wrestling Guerrilla	2003–2023	Current personnel	Former personnel
Japan	Pro Wrestling Land's End	2016	Current personnel	Former personnel
Japan	Pro Wrestling Noah	2000	Current personnel	Former personnel
Japan	Pro-Wrestling Shi-En	2010	Current personnel	Former personnel
Japan	Pro Wrestling Wave	2007	Current personnel	Former personnel
Japan	Pro Wrestling Zero1	2001	Current personnel	Former personnel
Japan	Professional Wrestling Just Tap Out	2019	Current personnel	Former personnel
Mexico	Promo Azteca	1995–1998	Current personnel	Former personnel
Japan	Pure-J	2017	Current personnel	Former personnel
Philippines	PUSO Wrestling	2024	Current personnel	Former personnel
Japan	Strong Style Pro-Wrestling	2005	Current personnel	Former personnel
England	Revolution Pro Wrestling	2012	Current personnel	Former personnel
India	Ring Ka King	2012	Current personnel	Former personnel
United States	Ring of Honor	2002	Current personnel	Former personnel
Australia	Riot City Wrestling	2006	Current personnel	Former personnel
Japan	Seadlinnng	2015	Current personnel	Former personnel
Japan	Sendai Girls' Pro Wrestling	2005	Current personnel	Former personnel
Singapore	Singapore Pro Wrestling	2012	Current personnel	Former personnel
Japan	Smash	2010–2012	Current personnel	Former personnel
United States	Smoky Mountain Wrestling	1991–1995	Current personnel	Former personnel
Canada	Stampede Wrestling	1948–1984, 1985–1989, 1999–2008	Current personnel	Former personnel
United States	Sukeban	2023	Current personnel	Former personnel
Japan	Super World of Sports	1990–1992	Current personnel	Former personnel
Japan	Tenryu Project	2010–2015; 2020	Current personnel	Former personnel
Japan	Tokyo Joshi Pro-Wrestling	2012	Current personnel	Former personnel
Japan	Tokyo Pro Wrestling	1966–1967; 1994–1998	Current personnel	Former personnel
United States	Total Nonstop Action Wrestling	2002	Current personnel	Former personnel
United States	United States Wrestling Association	1989–1997	Current personnel	Former personnel
Japan	Universal Lucha Libre	1990–1995	Current personnel	Former personnel
Mexico	Universal Wrestling Association	1975–1995	Current personnel	Former personnel
United States	Universal Wrestling Federation (Bill Watts)	1979–1987	Current personnel	Former personnel
United States	Universal Wrestling Federation (Herb Abrams)	1990–1994	Current personnel	Former personnel
Japan	Universal Wrestling Federation (Japan)	1984–1986; 1988–1990	Current personnel	Former personnel
Japan	UWF International	1991–1996	Current personnel	Former personnel
United States	West Coast Wrestling Connection	2005	Current personnel	Former personnel
Germany	Westside Xtreme Wrestling	2000	Current personnel	Former personnel
United States	Women of Wrestling	2000	Current personnel	Former personnel
Australia	World Championship Wrestling (Australia)	1964–1978	Current personnel	Former personnel
United States	World Championship Wrestling	1988–2001	Current personnel	Former personnel
United States	World Class Championship Wrestling	1966–1990	Current personnel	Former personnel
Australia	World Series Wrestling	2005	Current personnel	Former personnel
Japan	World Woman Pro-Wrestling Diana	2010	Current personnel	Former personnel
Japan	World Wonder Ring Stardom	2010	Current personnel	Former personnel
Australia	World Wrestling All-Stars	2001–2003	Current personnel	Former personnel
United States	World Wrestling Association (Indianapolis)	1964–1989	Current personnel	Former personnel
Mexico	World Wrestling Association	1986	Current personnel	Former personnel
Puerto Rico	World Wrestling Council	1973	Current personnel	Former personnel
South Africa	Champions Pro Wrestling	2002	Current personnel	Former personnel
Japan	Wrestle-1	2013–2020	Current personnel	Former personnel
Japan	Wrestle Association R	1992–2000	Current personnel	Former personnel
Japan	Wrestling International New Generations	1991–1994	Current personnel	Former personnel
Japan	Wrestling New Classic	2012–2014	Current personnel	Former personnel
Japan	Wrestling of Darkness 666	2003	Current personnel	Former personnel
United States	Wrestling Superstars Live	1996–2009	Current personnel	Former personnel
India	Wrestling Xtreme Mania	2025	Current personnel	Former personnel
United States	WWE	1953	Current personnel	Former personnel

== See also ==
- List of professional wrestling promoters
- List of professional wrestling promotions
  - List of independent wrestling promotions in Canada
  - List of independent wrestling promotions in the United States
    - List of National Wrestling Alliance territories
  - List of professional wrestling organisations in Australia
  - List of professional wrestling promotions in Europe
  - List of professional wrestling promotions in Japan
  - List of professional wrestling promotions in Mexico
  - List of professional wrestling promotions in New Zealand
  - List of professional wrestling promotions in South America
  - List of professional wrestling promotions in the United Kingdom
- List of women's wrestling promotions
  - List of women's wrestling promotions in the United States
