= List of former Power League Wrestling personnel =

Power League Wrestling (PLW) is a professional wrestling promotion based in Pawtucket, Rhode Island. Former employees in PLW consist of professional wrestlers, managers, play-by-play and color commentators, announcers, interviewers and referees.

== List of PLW alumni ==
=== Male wrestlers ===
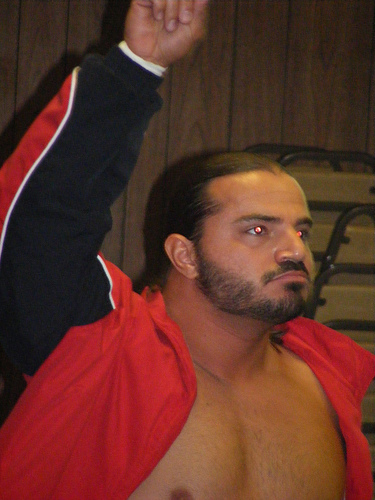
Alex Arion

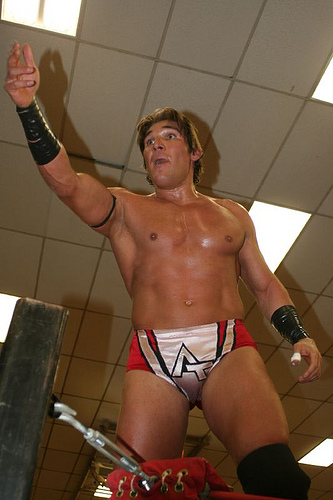
Antonio Thomas

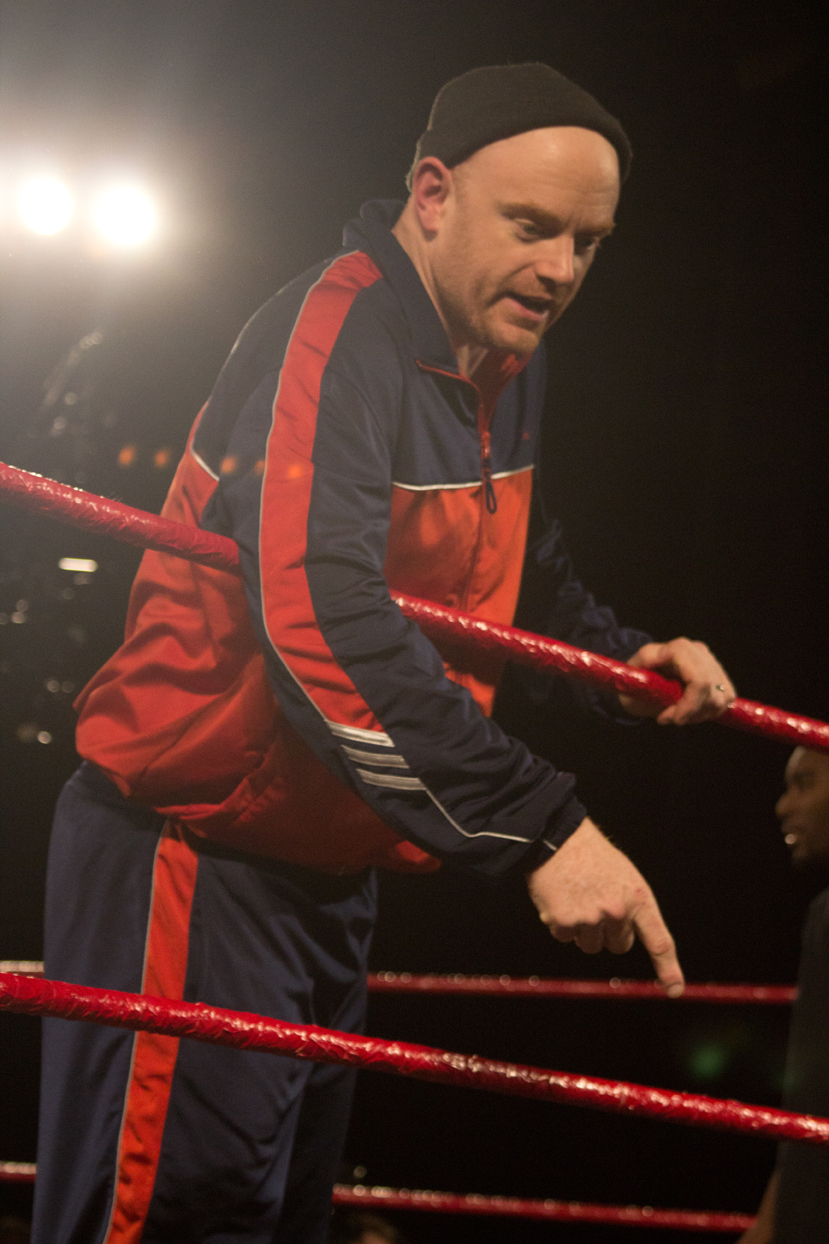
Brutal Bob Evans

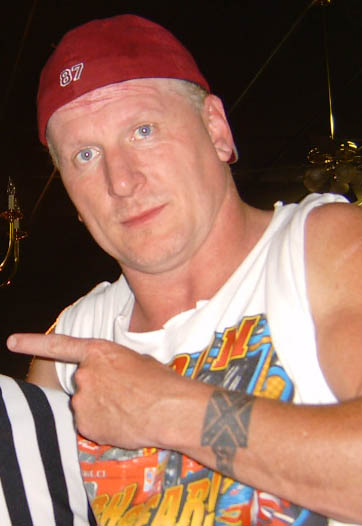
Chris Hamrick

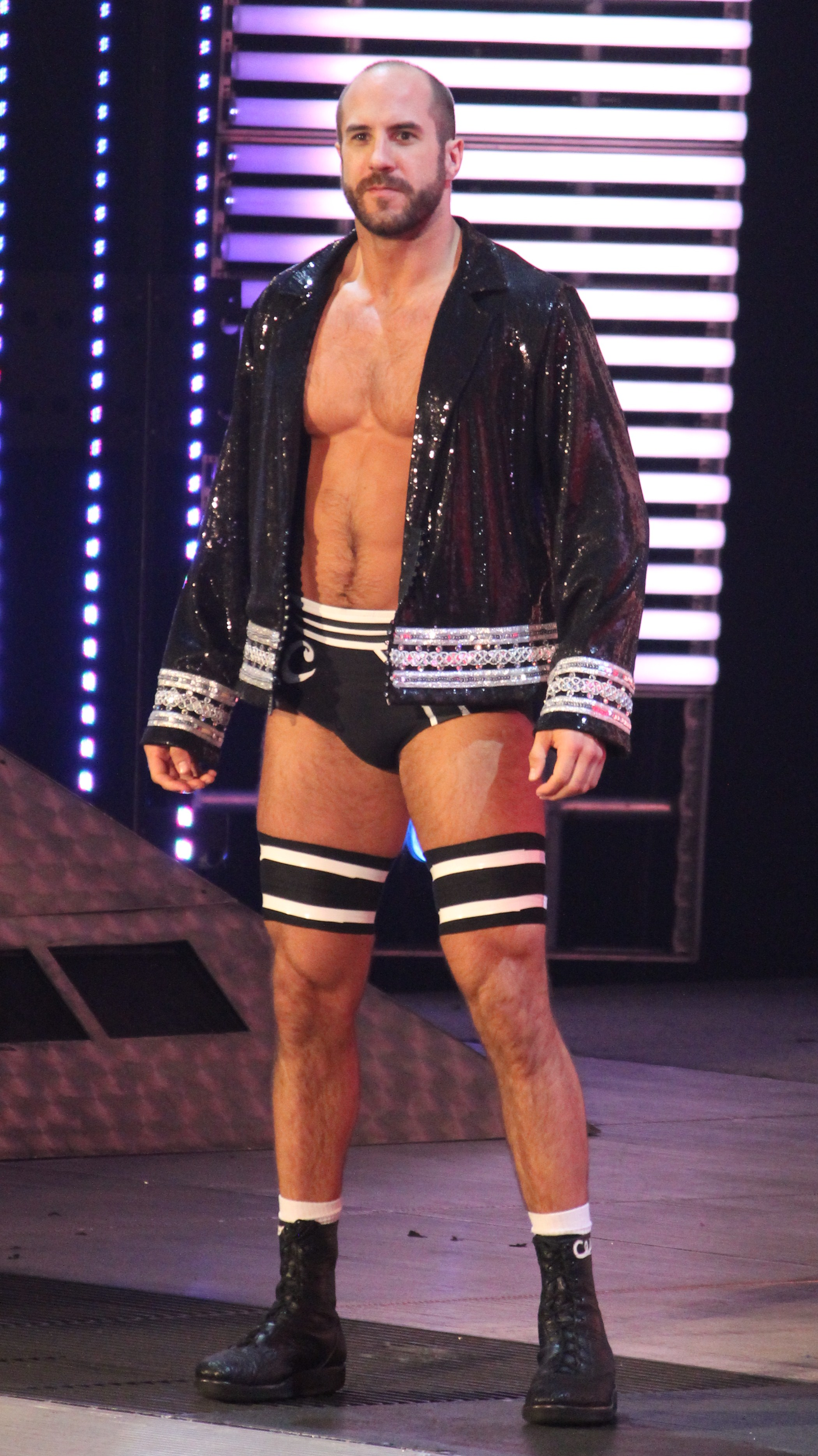
Claudio Castagnoli

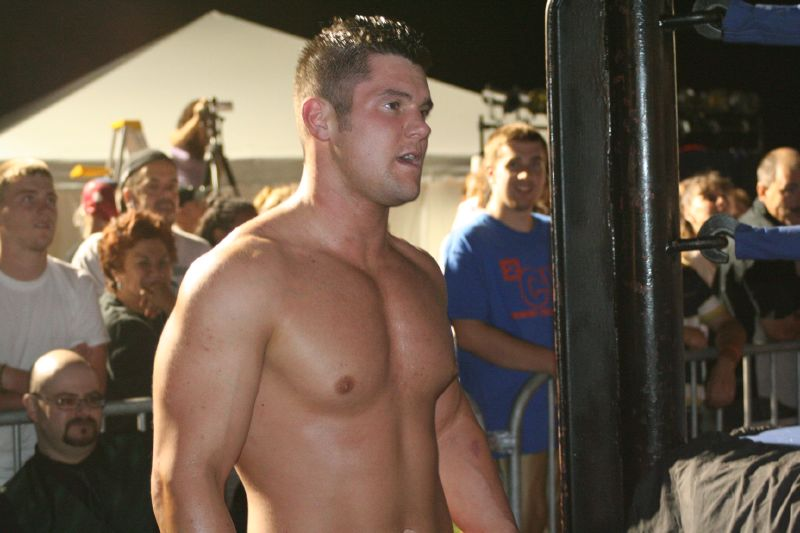
Eddie Edwards

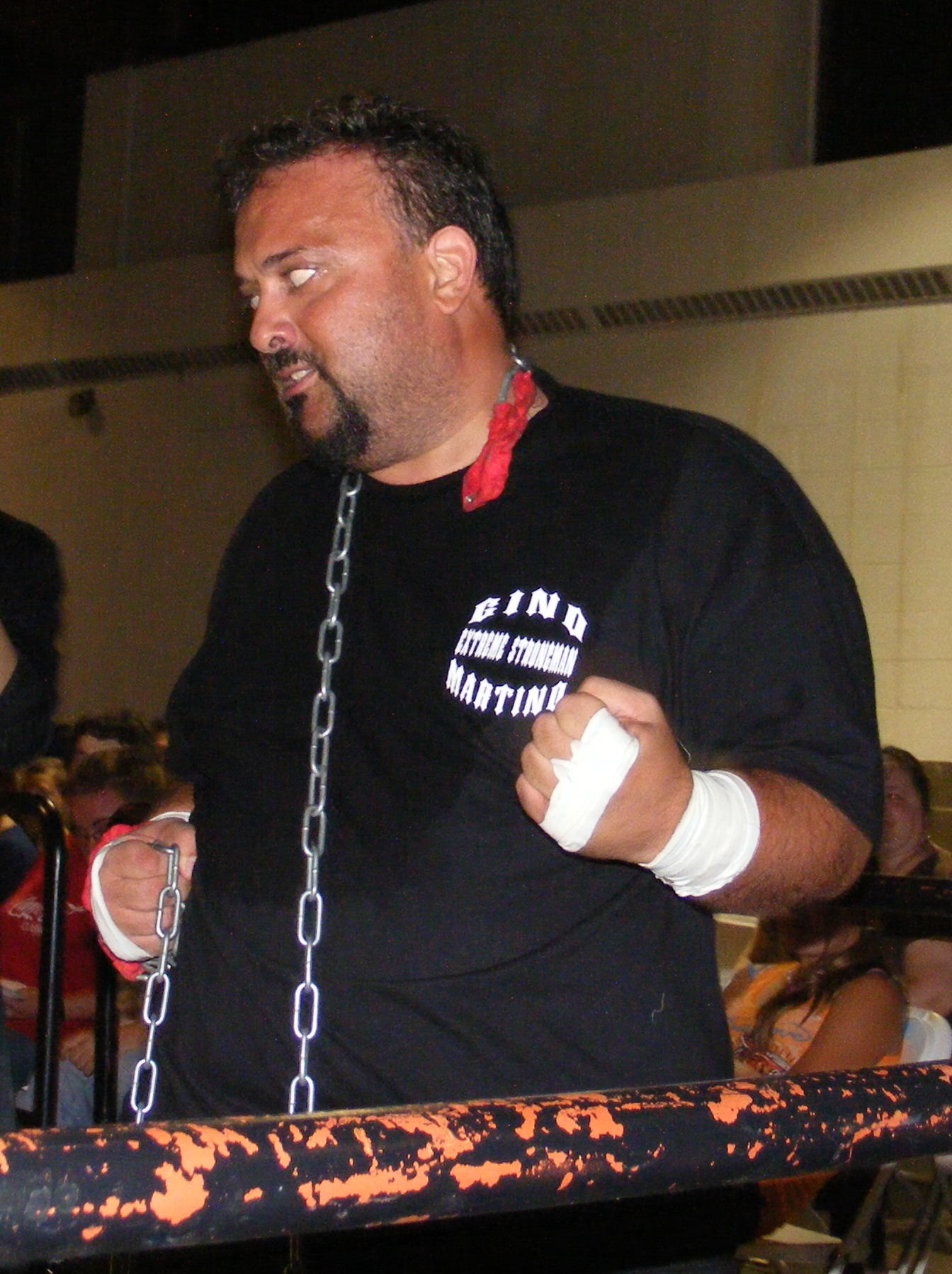
Gino Martino

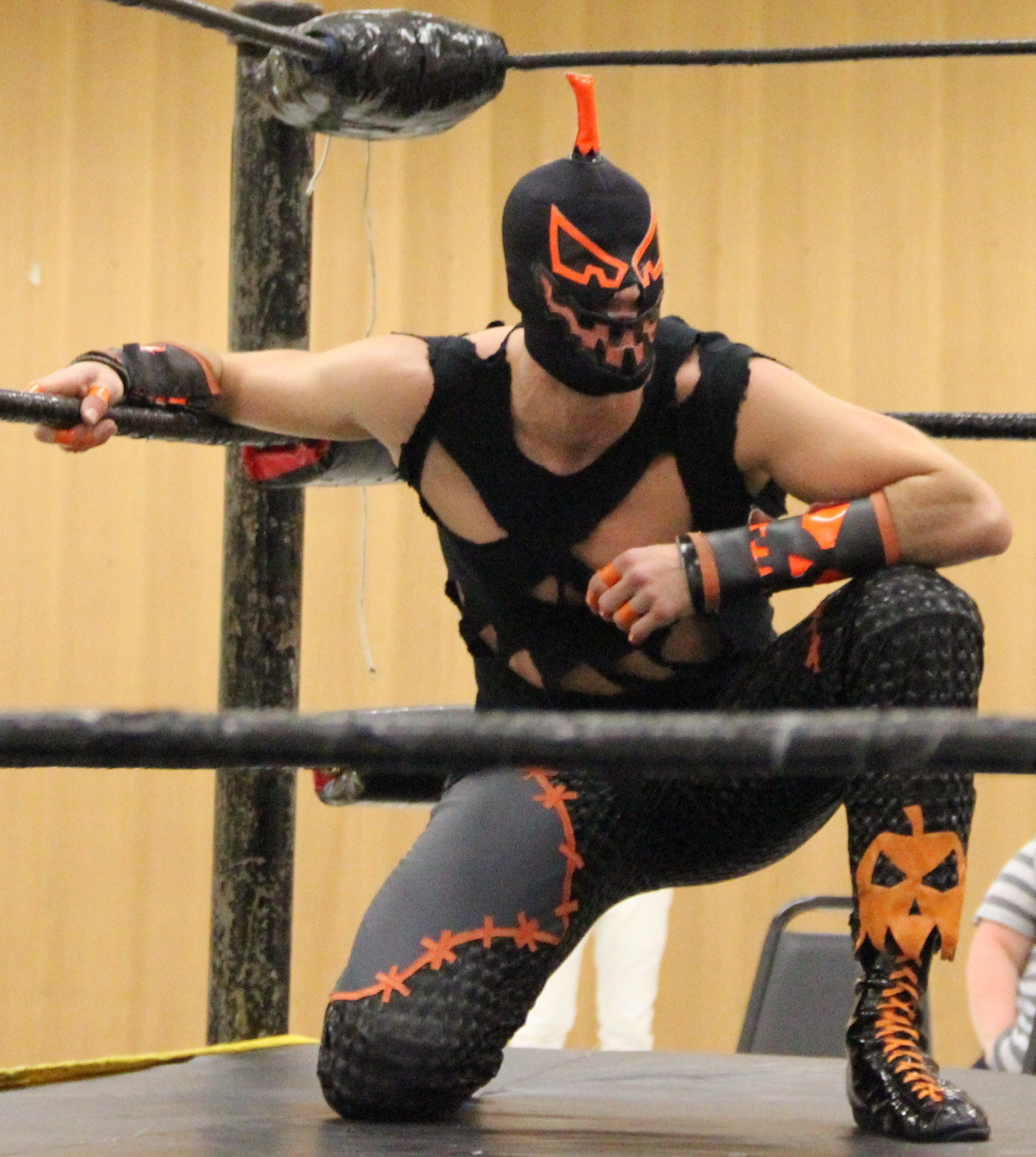
Hallowicked

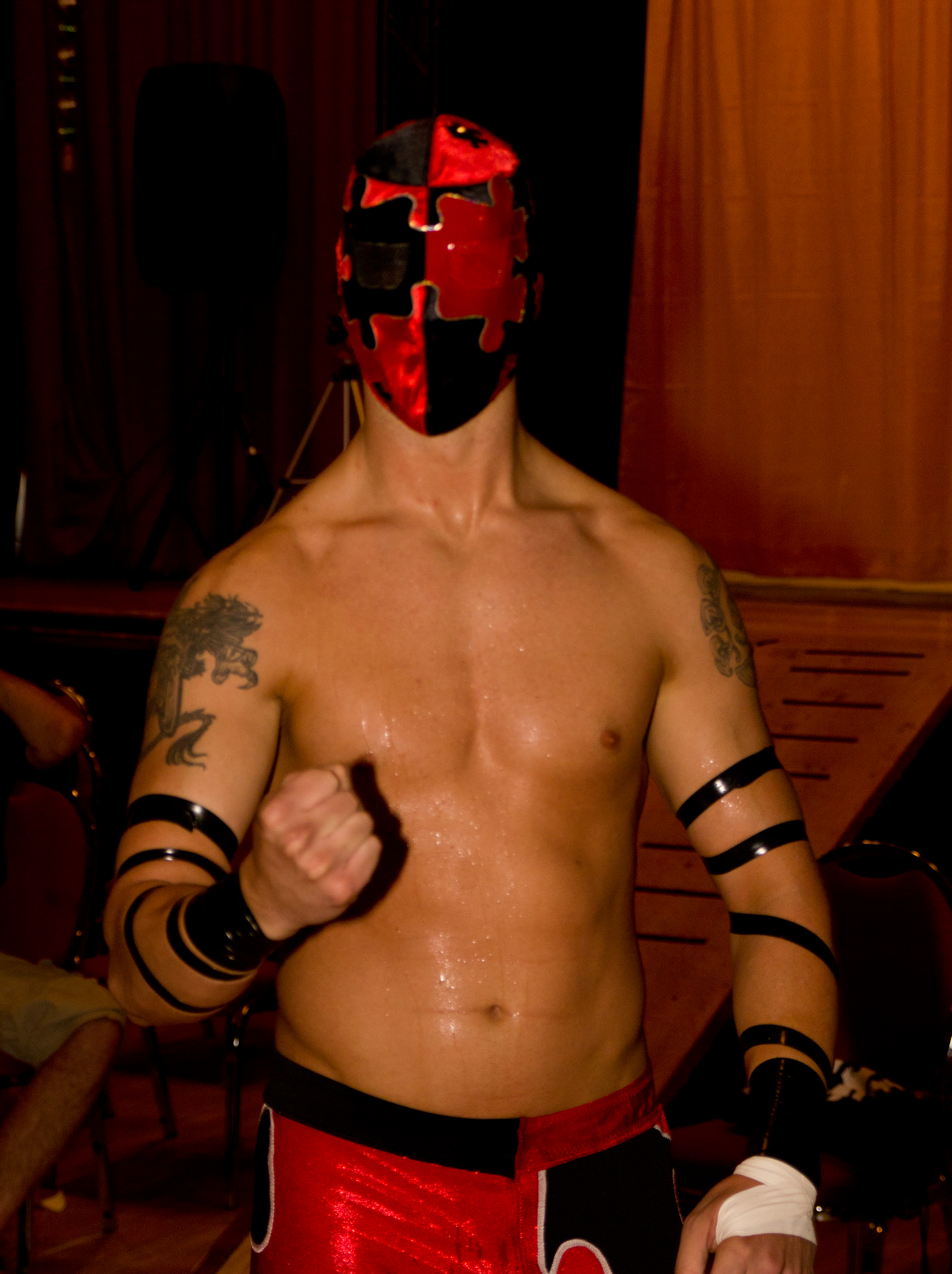
Jigsaw

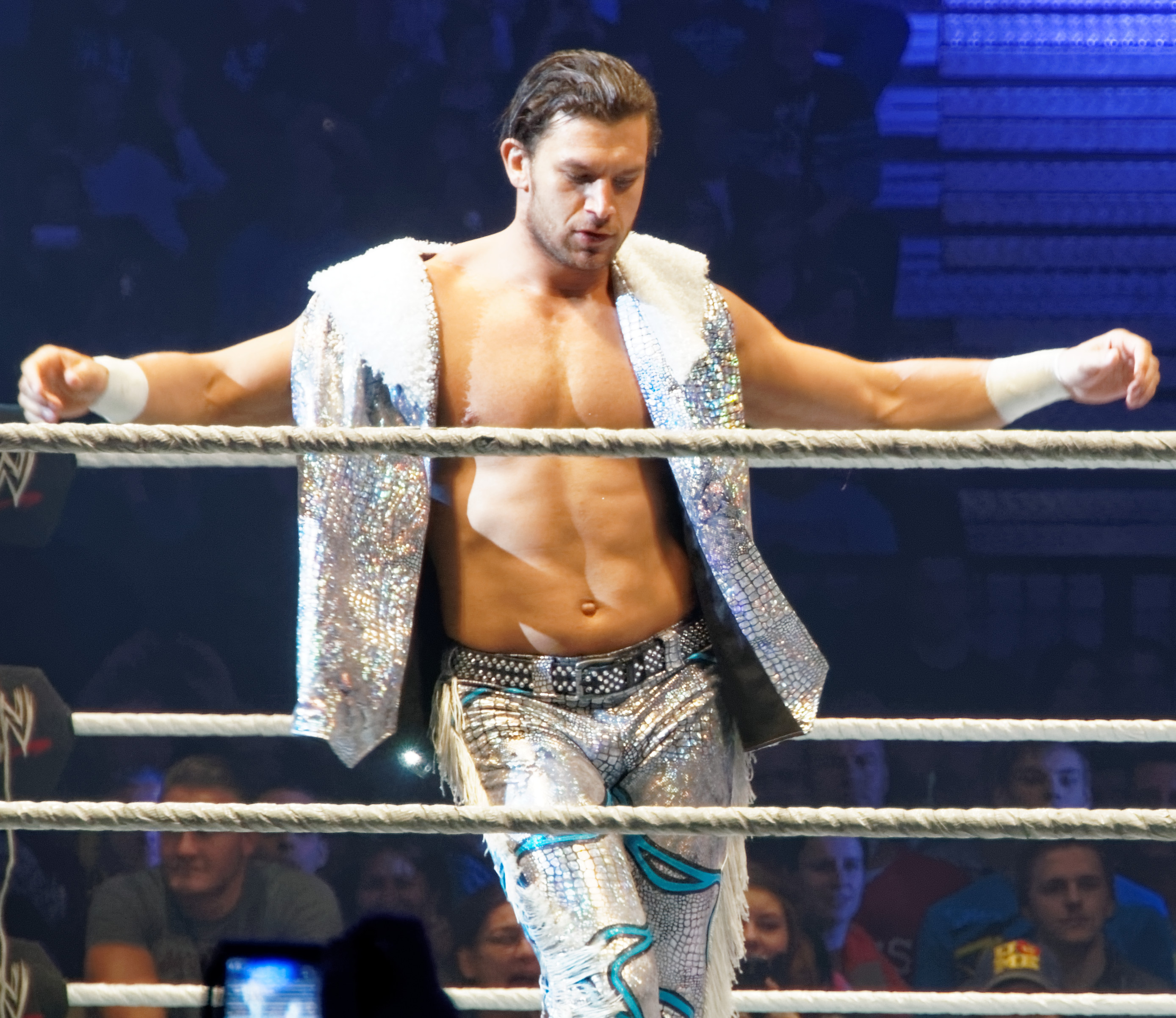
Johnny Curtis

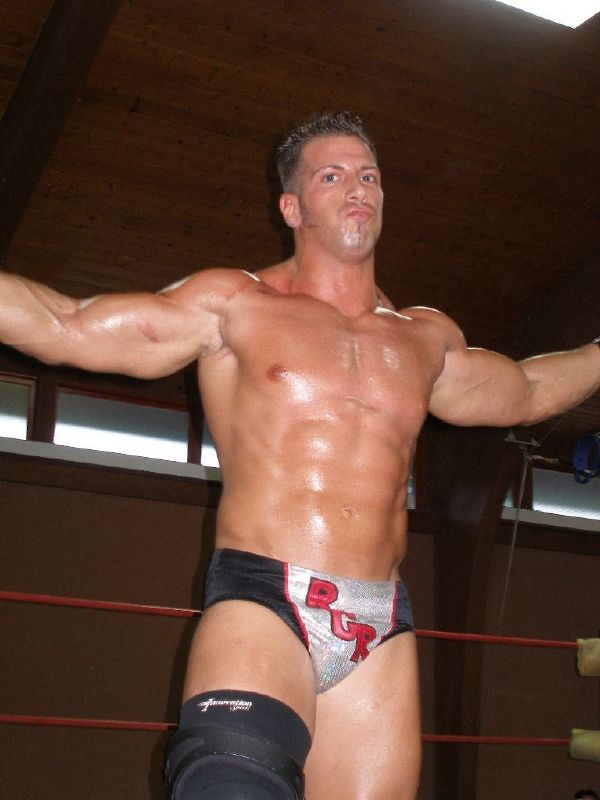
Johnny Heartbreaker

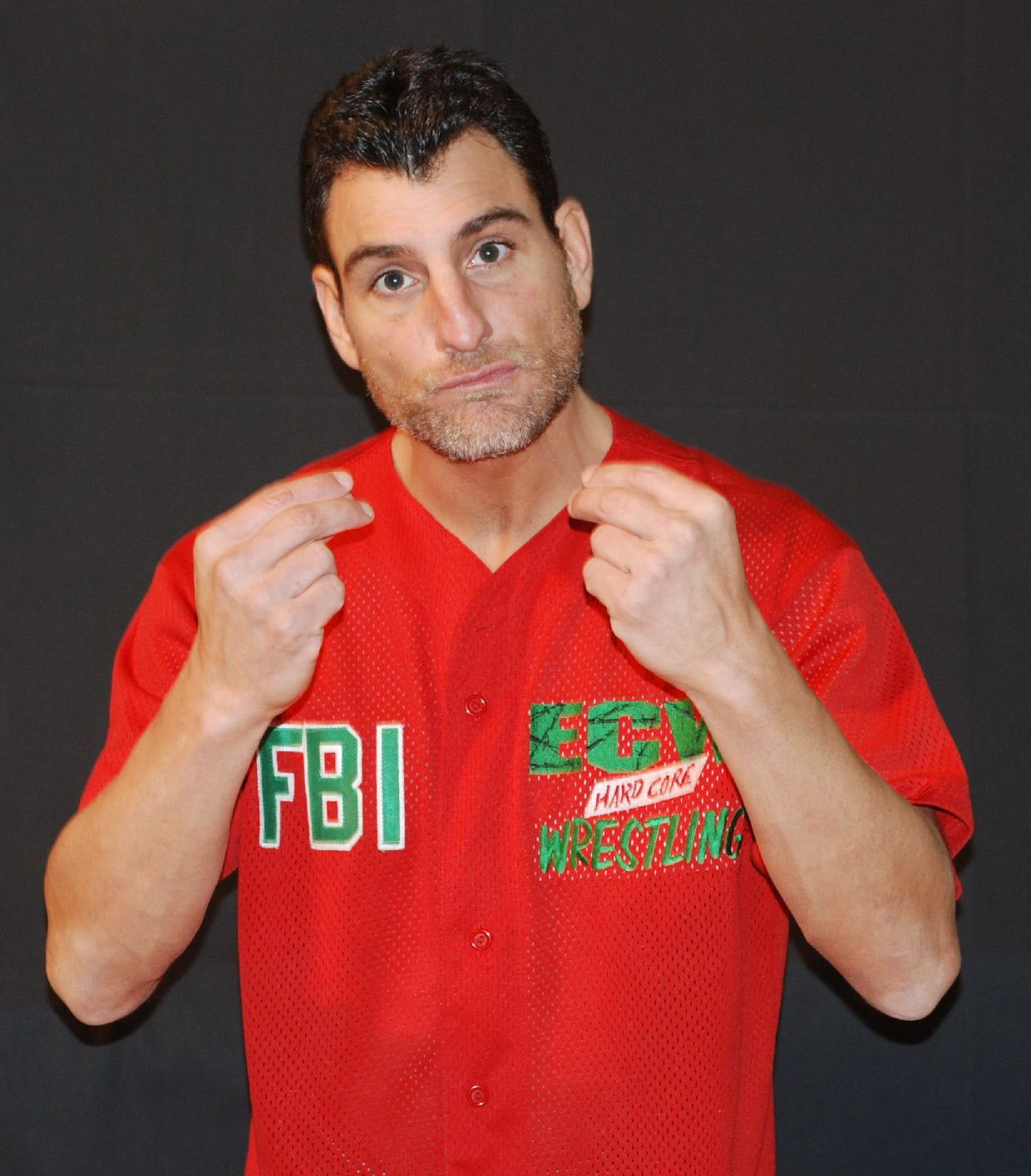
Little Guido

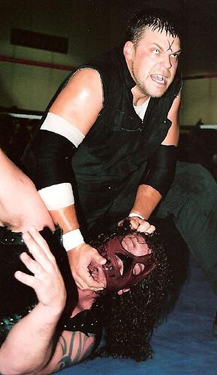
Michael Sain

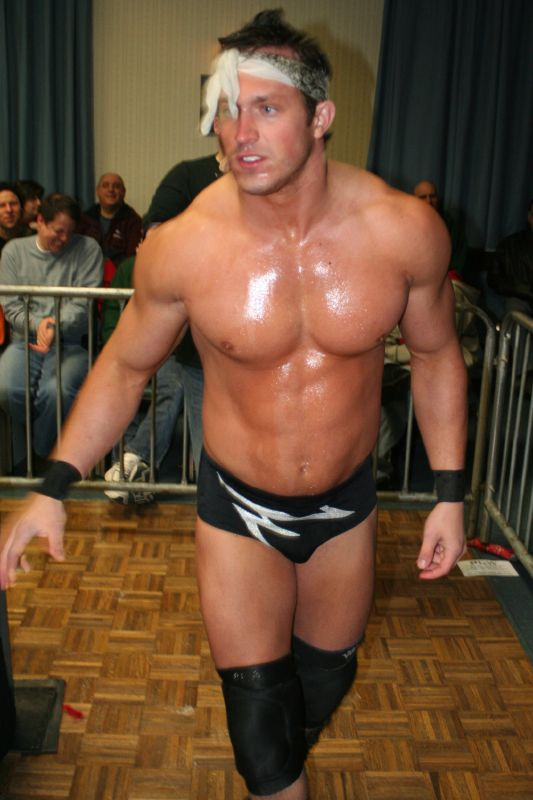
Mike Bennett

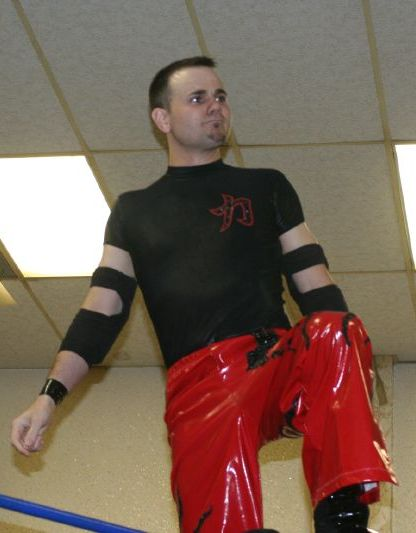
Mike Quackenbush

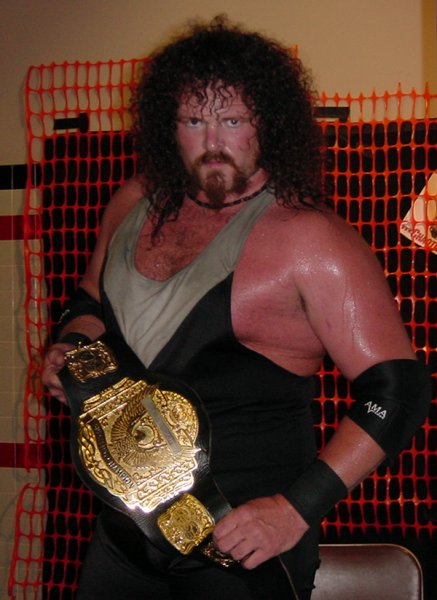
Rick Fuller

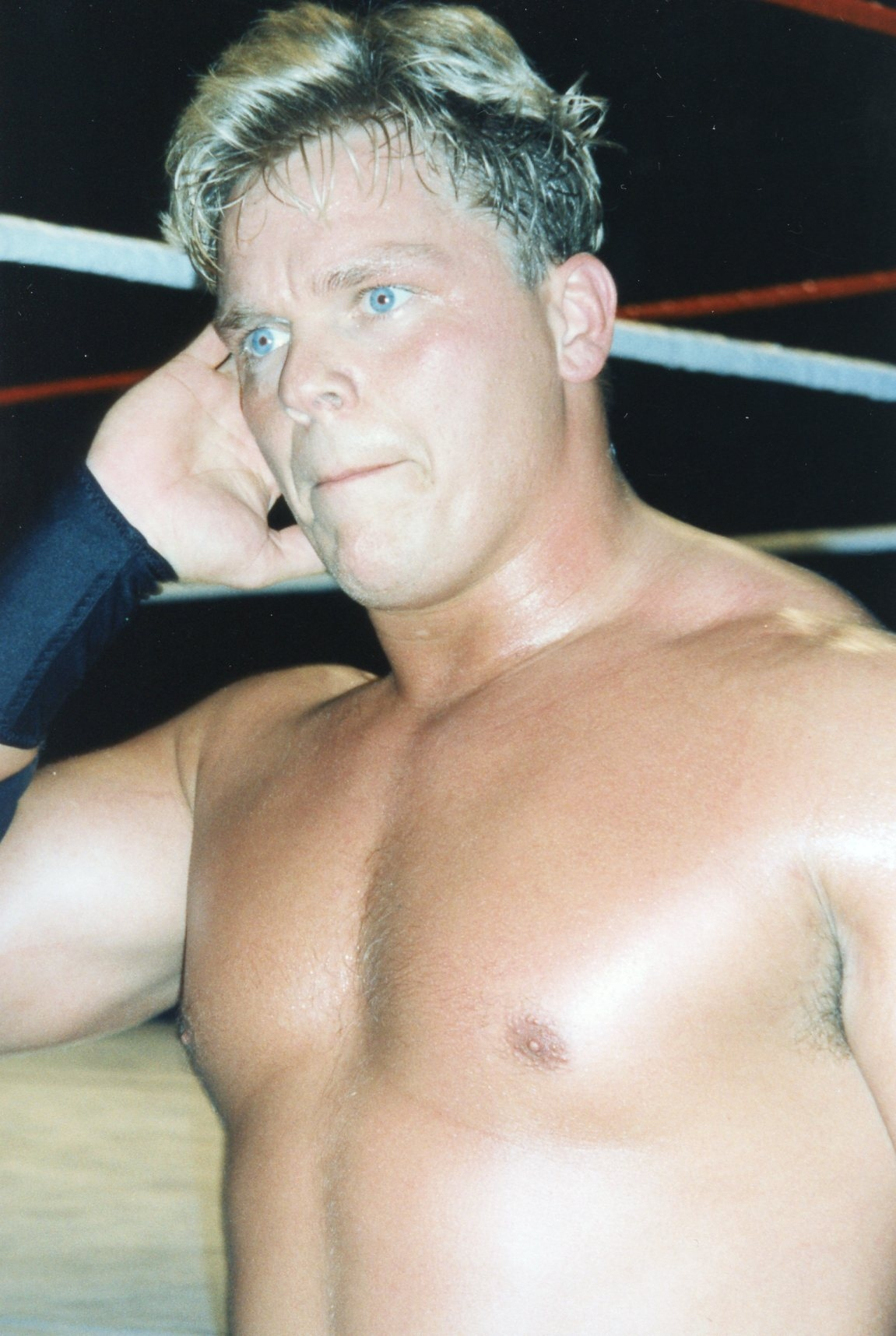
Shane Douglas

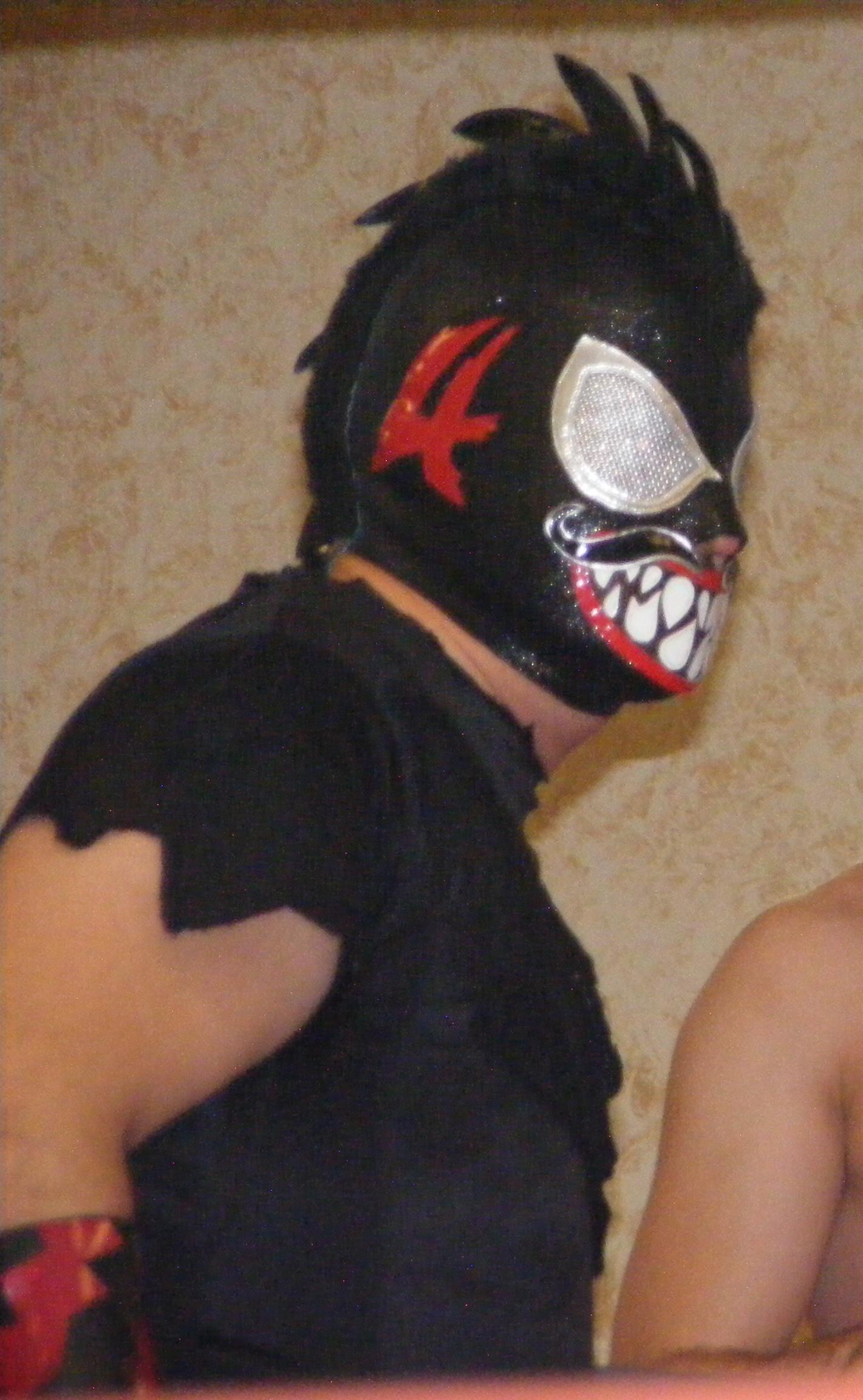
Shane Storm

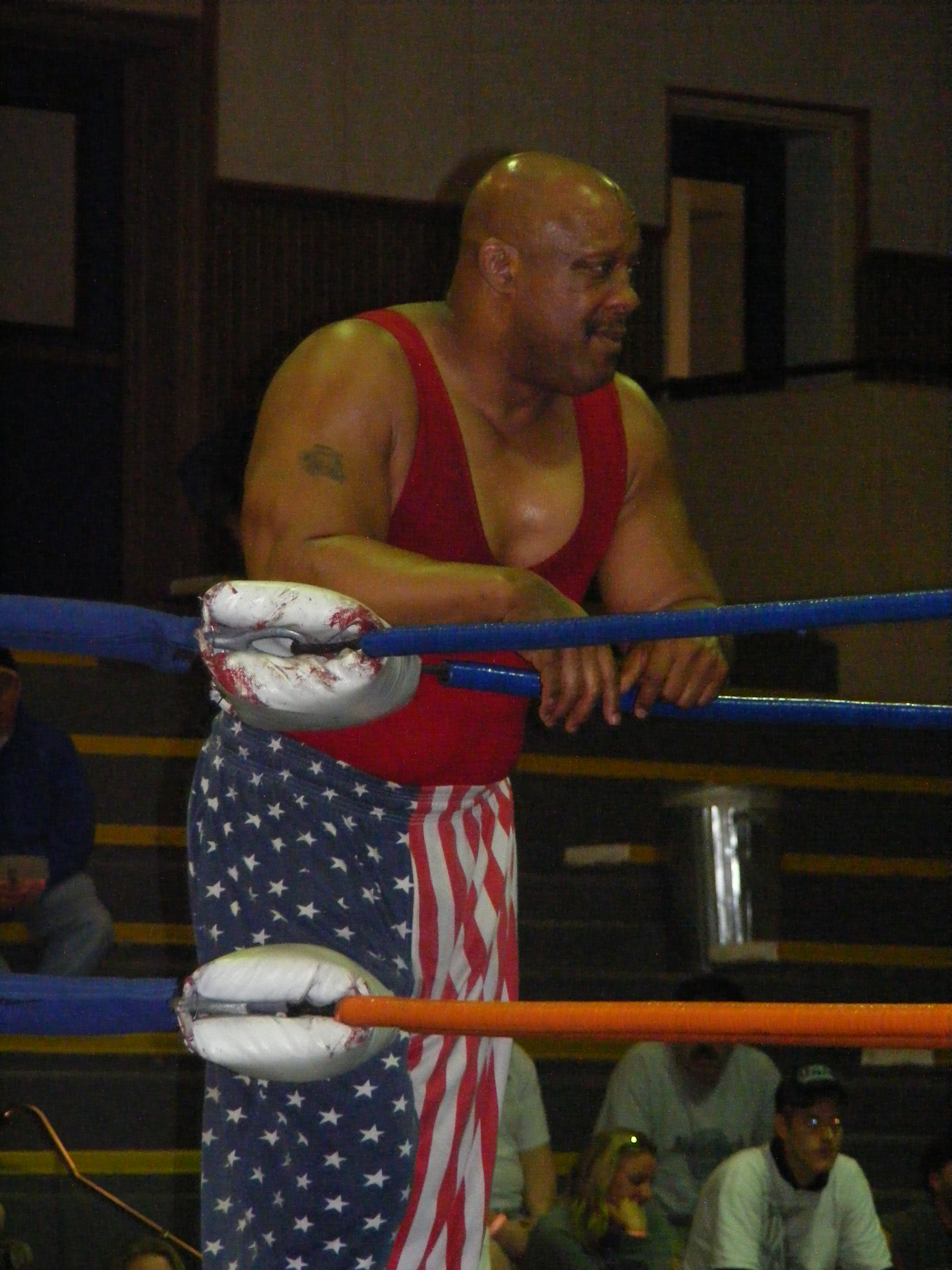
Tony Atlas

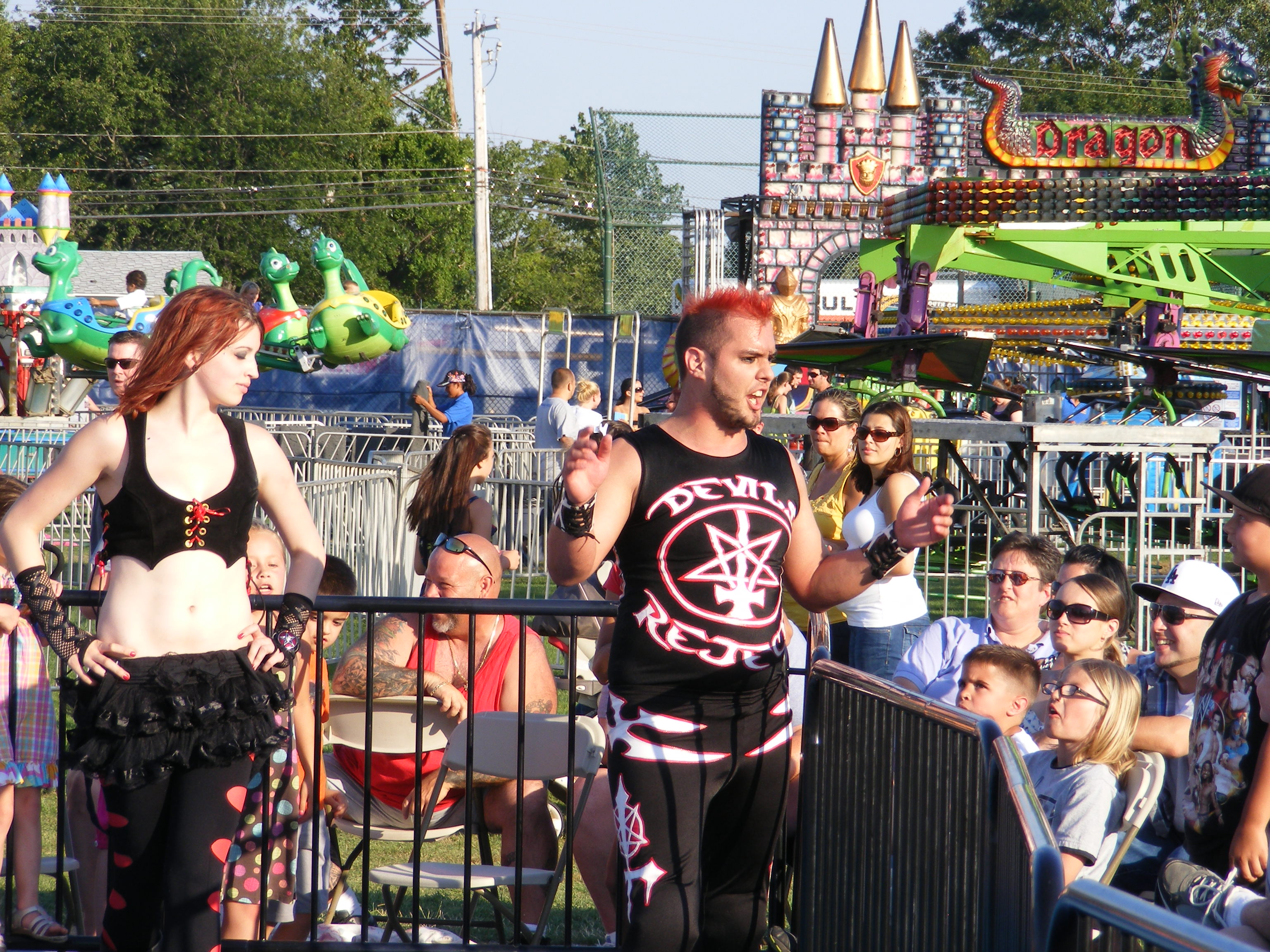
Brandon Webb and Valkerie

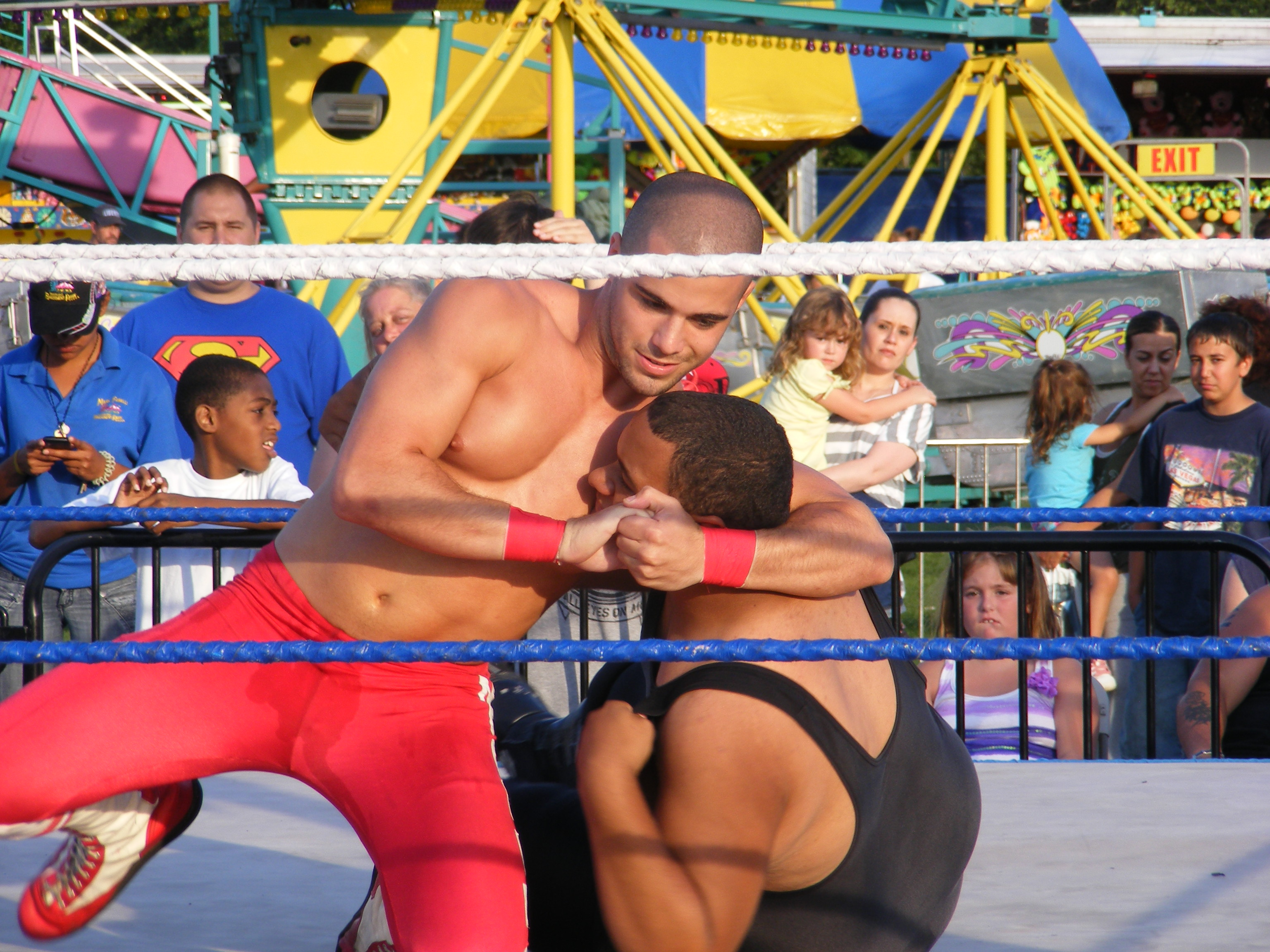
Matt Magnum (left) and "Shady" Shay Silva (right)

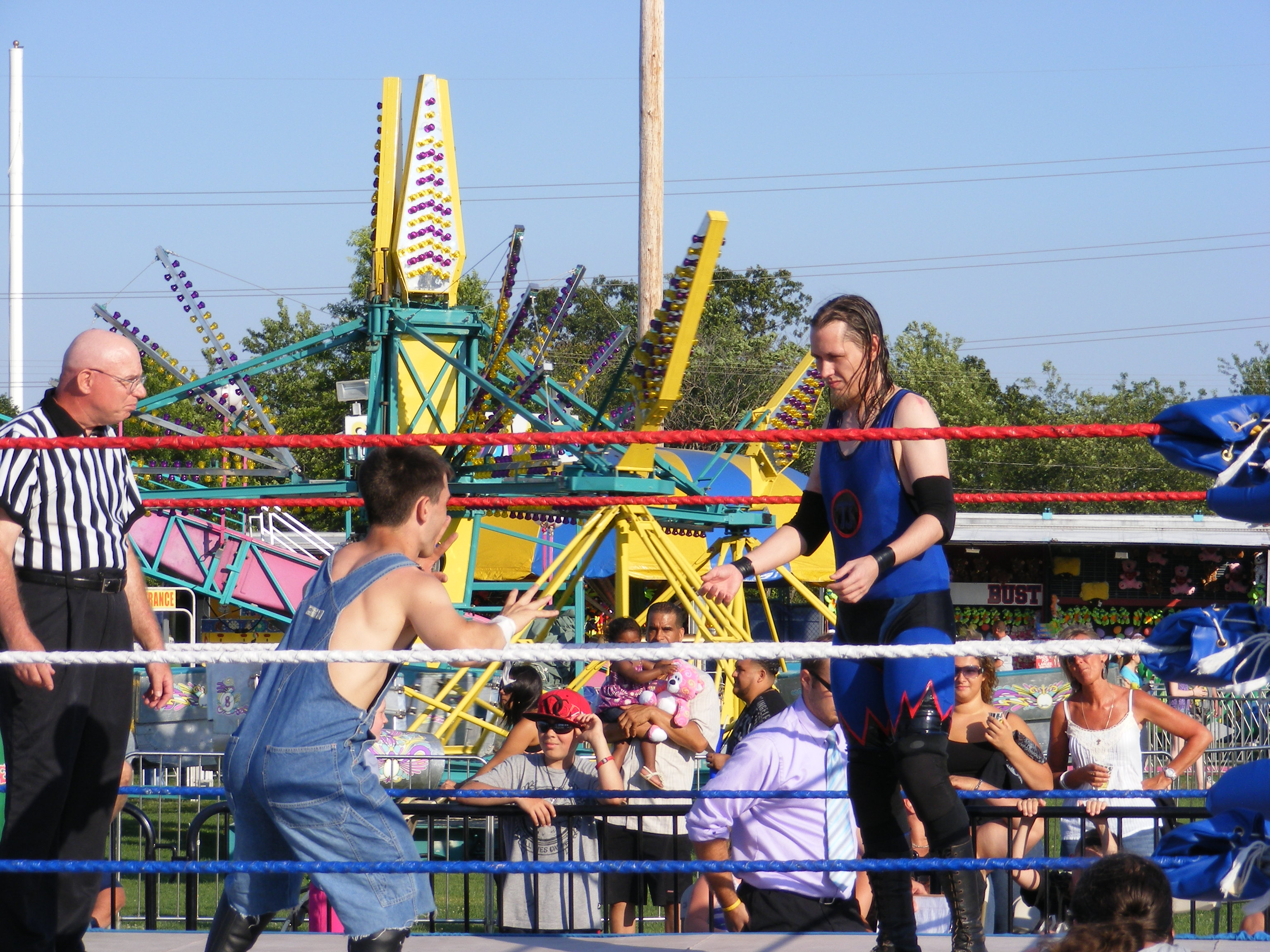
T.J. Richter and midget wrestler Mini McGraw

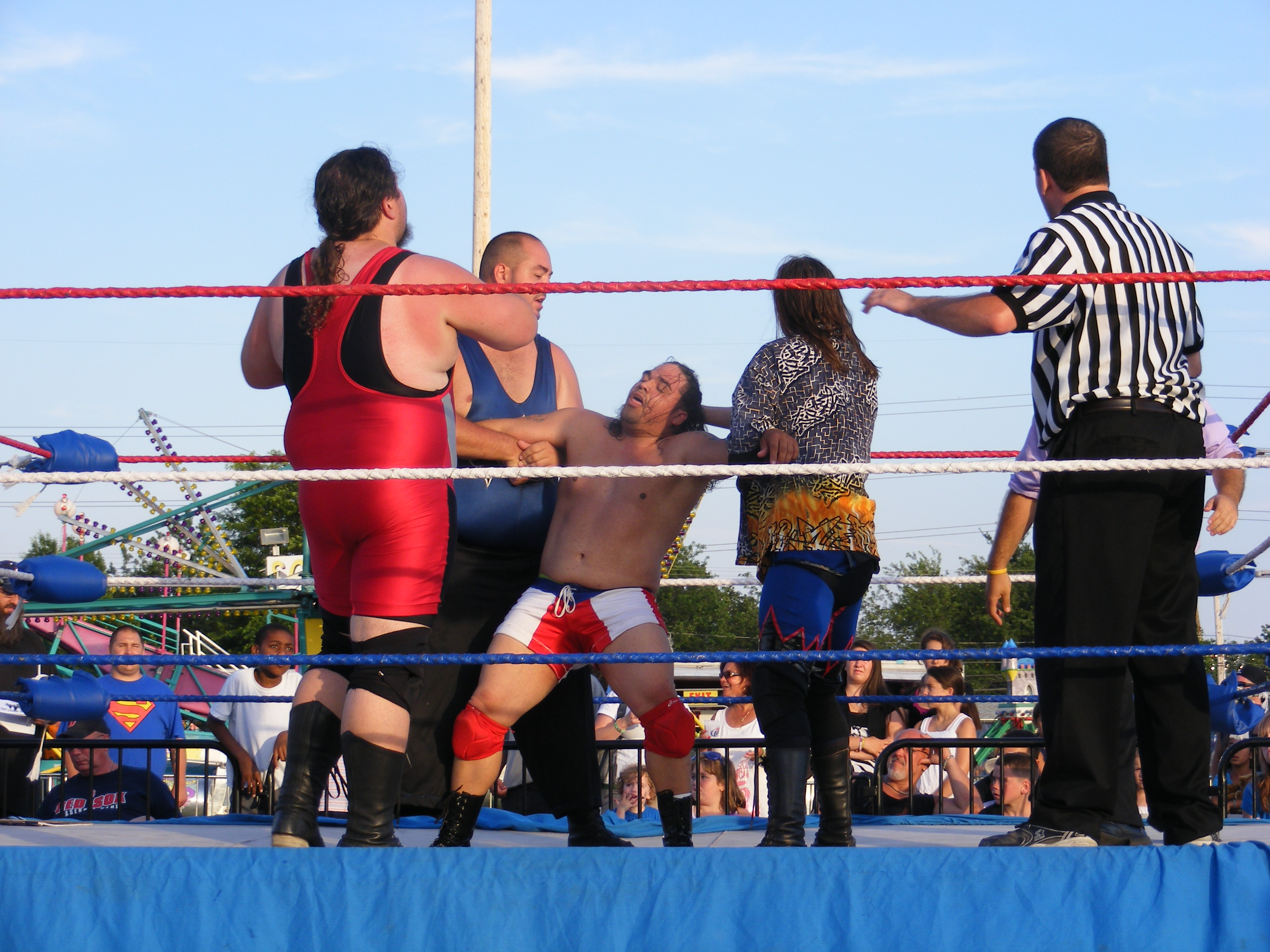
Matt Storm (far left), with Mr. Munroe (left) and T.J. Richter (right), and Papi Cruz (center)

Birth name:	Ring name(s):	Tenure:	Notes
Unknown	Aaron Knight / AK Fuego	2004–	
Unknown	Aaron Morrison	1999; 2012	
Unknown	Adam Booker	2001; 2005	
Unknown	Adam Hastey	2005	
Unknown	Al Diaz	1992	
Alex Pliakos	Alex Arion	1999	
Unknown	Alex Cypher	2012	
Steve Langer	Alex Payne	1993–1994; 1996–2000; 2003–	
Scott King	Alexander Worthington III	2005	
Unknown	Allen Wong	1997	
Unknown	Amazin' Jay	1993–1999; 2004–	
Unknown	Andre Lyons	2003–2005	
Unknown	Andy Sweet	2014–	
Unknown	Andy Licious / Perry Von Vicious	2008–2010	
Unknown	Angel	2004; 2006	
Unknown	Anthony Fitch	2008; 2010	
Unknown	Anthony Greene / A.G. Saint / Josiah Matthews	2012–	
Unknown	Anthony Stone / Bloodstone	2001; 2009	
Unknown	Antonio Adams	1994–1995	
Thomas Matera	Antonio Thomas	2004; 2013	
Unknown	Apocalypse	2004	
Unknown	Armenian Terror	1995	
Unknown	Arnie Payne	1993	
Mark McCormick	Atomic Mark	1993–1995	
Unknown	Atomic Punk	1997–1998	
Unknown	Autoparts Dealer	1991–1992	
Unknown	AWOL	1993	
Unknown	Baby Rex	2013	
Unknown	The Bandit	1992	
Unknown	Barney Mandigo	1993	
Unknown	Bart Sanchez	1993	
Unknown	B.A. Tatum	2009	
Unknown	The Bean	1993	
Unknown	The Beast	2002	
Unknown	Ben Dover		
Unknown	Bert Williams	2007	
Unknown	Big Daddy 'fro	1993	
Unknown	Big Daddy Kahuna	2004	
Unknown	Big Man Dan	1995	
Unknown	Big Tony Soprano	2002	
William White, Jr.	Billy Black	1999–2000	
Unknown	Billy Braxx	2001; 2003	
Unknown	Billy King	2006–	
Chad Wicks	Billy Kryptonite	2003	
Unknown	Billy the Beekeeper	1993	
Unknown	BJ Sowatt	1993	
Unknown	Black Out	1993–1995	
Unknown	The Blade	1992	
Unknown	The Blind One	1993	
Unknown	BL McGee	1993	
Unknown	Blue Streak	1993	
Pat McCaughey	Blue Thunder	1992–1993	
Unknown	Bo Blitz	2003	
Unknown	Bonehead		
Unknown	Boogie Knight	1998–1999	
Dylan Casey	Brad Hollister	2008	
Unknown	Brandon Webb / The Kreeper	2003–	
Unknown	Brian Flynn	1991–1992	
Unknown	Brian Heel	2004	
Unknown	Brian Roberts	1997	
Mike Baker	Brickhouse Baker	2004; 2007–	
Unknown	Brooklyn Bad Boy	1993	
Robert Evans	Brutal Bob Evans	1992–1993; 1995–1999	
Unknown	Bryce Andrews	2006	
Unknown	Buck Nasty	2010	
Unknown	Buck Nude	1997	
Unknown	Bubba	2000	
Michael Romano	Buddy Romano	2011; 2013–	
Unknown	Bud-Man	1993	
Unknown	Burgmaster 3000	1993	
Unknown	Caesar Suave	2001	
Unknown	Cain the Executioner / TJ Richter	1993–2001; 2004–	
Unknown	Canadian Kilted Yaksman	1993	
Unknown	Captain Canal	1992; 1994	
Unknown	Captain Halligan	1993	
Unknown	Cargil Vinton	2010–	
Unknown	Carlos Polanco	1993	
Unknown	Casa Nova	2000	
Unknown	Chad "Thunder" Storm	1996	
Unknown	Chainsaw Sawyer	2013	
Unknown	The Champion	1994	
Unknown	Champion #2		
Unknown	Chaos	1993	
Unknown	Charlemagne	1992	
Unknown	Charles I. Anderson / CIA	1996–1997	
Unknown	Charlie Bruen / Jose Perez	2000–2004; 2009–	
Corey Peloquin	Chi Chi Cruz	2007	
Dave Farrar	Chief Dave Foxx	1998–1999	
Unknown	Chris Blackheart	2000–	
Unknown	Chris Camero	2003	
Chris Hamrick	Chris Hamrick	2001	
Unknown	Chris Matrix	2013–	
Unknown	Chris Students	2013–	
Unknown	Christian Casanova	2014–	
Unknown	Chris Venom	2000–2004	
Unknown	Chupacabra	1997	
Unknown	Cinna	2000–2004	
Unknown	CJ Matthews	2003–	
Claudio Castagnoli	Claudio Castagnoli	2004	
Unknown	Chris Sadistic	2011–2012	
Unknown	Convict #1	2010–	
Unknown	Convict #2	2012	
Unknown	Convict #3		
Unknown	The Coroner	1994–1995	
Unknown	Cotton Eye Joe	1995	
Unknown	Cranberry Brother #1	1992	
Unknown	Cranberry Brother #2	1992	
Unknown	The Crossing Guard	1993	
Unknown	Corporal Chaos	1998	
Unknown	The Crusher / Sonny Goodspeed	1996–1997; 2000	
Unknown	Crypt Keeper	1994–1995	
Unknown	Cueball	2000	
Dan Summers	Curly	2013–	
Unknown	Da Bronx Thug / Little Killer	2000–	
Jim Dimmak	Daedilus Dimmak	1997–2000; 2009	Special guest commentator for Power-Fest 2009
Unknown	Dallas Austin	1997–1998	
Unknown	Damian Houston	2000–2001	
Unknown	Damien	1993	
Unknown	Damien Darling	2011	
Unknown	Damien Stuart	1998	
Unknown	Dan Bidondi	2000	
Unknown	Dan Havoc	2003	
Unknown	Dan Hawk	1999	
Unknown	Dan Strikes	2007; 2011	
Unknown	Dan Terry	2014	
Unknown	Danny Cama	1996	
Dan Marsh	Danny Davis	2011	
Unknown	Danzig	1993	
Unknown	Darkhawk	1992	
Unknown	Dark Knight	1991	
Unknown	Dark Marauder	1997–1998	
Unknown	Darren Sypher	1998	
Unknown	Dave Brown	1993–1995	
Unknown	Dave Padula / Minus	2000	
Unknown	Dave Vicious	1999	
Unknown	Davey Cash / The Hi-Lite Kid	2000–2004; 2009–	
Unknown	David Baker	2007–2013	
Unknown	David Loomis	2010–	
Unknown	Derek Molhan / Uncle Ulysses McGraw	1992–1993; 1995–	PLW Commissioner from 2002–2004
Unknown	Derik Destiny / Whispering Death	1994–1995; 1997–2007	Also referee
Unknown	Devastator	1993–1994	
Unknown	Devin Baker	2010–2012	
Unknown	Diamond Dave Donovan	2000	
Unknown	DJ Baron	2006	
Unknown	Doc		
Unknown	Doink the Clown	2001; 2004–2007	
Unknown	Dollar D	2005–	
Unknown	Dominic "Dice" Gambino	2004	
Unknown	Dominic Simone	2010	
Unknown	Don Juan de Santo / John 3:16	1996–2001	
Unknown	Don Vega	2000–	
Unknown	Don Who	1993	
Unknown	Doom	1995	
Unknown	Doug Summers	2006; 2008–	
Unknown	Dragon	2000	
Unknown	Draven	1999–2004	
Jeremy Barron	Dr. Heresy	1996–	
Unknown	Dr. Pain	1991–1993	
Unknown	Dr. X	2007–2008	
Unknown	Duke Maximum	2003–	
Unknown	Dutch Davidson	1992–1994	
Unknown	Easter Egg	1992	
Unknown	Ebony Blade	2011	
Unknown	Ed Doura	1998	
Unknown	Eddie Edwards	2007	
Vince Bauer	Eddie Ryan	2011	
Unknown	Edward G. Xtasy	2000–2001; 2013	
Unknown	The Egyptian Magician	1995	
Unknown	Eliminator	1991–1992	
Unknown	El Bombastico	1999–2000	
Unknown	El Chupacarba	1997	
Unknown	El Misterio	1997	
Eric Baras	Eric Dylan	2007–	
Unknown	Eric Egoh	2005–	
Unknown	Eric Hindy	1995	
Evan Siks	Evan Siks	2004; 2007–2008; 2014	
Unknown	Exterminator	1993–2000	
Unknown	The Fairgrounds Keeper	1993	
Unknown	Father Joe Escobar	1995	
Unknown	FBI	1999	
Unknown	"Fighter" Joe O.	1991–1993	
Unknown	Fire Cat	2007	
Unknown	Flame	1993	
Unknown	Flaming Torch	1992	
Unknown	Flavor	1991–1992	
Unknown	Frank Blaze	2004–2004; 2007	
Unknown	Frankie Armadillo	2000–2001; 2005	
Unknown	Frankie Vain / Vain Valentino	2002; 2006–	
Unknown	Frat Boy #1	1998	
Unknown	Frat Boy #2	1998	
Unknown	Frat Boy #3	1998	
Unknown	Fred Araujo	2001–2004	
Unknown	The Galloping Chicken	1995	
Unknown	Gary Apollo	2001–	
Unknown	Gary Gold	2006	
Unknown	Gary "The Torch" Kudalis	1998	
Unknown	Greg Abercrombie		
Unknown	Gregory Edwards / Gregory Edwards Dreyfuss (GED)	2002–2003; 2006–	
Unknown	Ghetto Fabulous	2003	
Unknown	Gino Giovanni	2001; 2009–	
John Ferraro	Gino Martino	1998–1999	
Unknown	Gold Finger	1993	
Unknown	Good Doctor	1992	
Unknown	GQ Smooth	2002, 2003	
Unknown	Grave Digger	1993	
Unknown	The Great Acuma	1995–1998	
Unknown	Hallowicked	2004	
Unknown	Hammer Head	1993	
Unknown	Hardley Dangerous	1993	
Unknown	Harley Gold	1993	
Unknown	Havoc	1993	
Corey Hepburn	H-Bomb	1993–1995	
Unknown	HcRc / "Stuck-up" Steve Taylor	1999–2001	
Unknown	High Roller	1993	
Unknown	High Roller #2	1993	
Unknown	Hillbilly Tim	1995	
Unknown	Homeless Avenger	1993	
Unknown	The Hudson Riverboat Watcher	1992–1993	
Unknown	Huey McGraw	2004–	
Unknown	Hurricane Harvey	1992	
Unknown	The Idiot	1992	
Unknown	Iguana Boy	1992	
Unknown	I.M. Valor	2011–2012	
Unknown	The Insane One	1992–1993	
Unknown	Inside Out	1994	
Unknown	Iraqnid	2006–	
Unknown	Iron Fist	2000	
Unknown	Irwin Quincy	2002–2004	
Unknown	Isaiah Rex	2013	
Unknown	Jacques	1995	
Unknown	Jamie Pike	2009	
Unknown	Jamie Starr	2008	
Allen Ferreira	Jason Blade	2002–2003	
Unknown	Jason the Slasher	1996–	
Unknown	Jay A. / The Mercenary / Shadow Warrior	1991–1995	
Unknown	Jay Banville	1993–1994	Also referee
Unknown	Jay Jailette		
Unknown	Jay Messier	1996	
Unknown	Jeff Johnson	2009	
Ed McGuckin	Jigsaw	2004	
Unknown	Jimi T. Bean	2003	
Unknown	Jimmy Preston	2013	
Unknown	Jim Tiernan	2001–2004	
Unknown	Joe Branco	1991–1992	
Joseph Rugliano	Joe Rules	2000	
Unknown	John Lowe	2003	
Unknown	John Torres	1995–1996	
Unknown	Johnny Angel	2000–2003; 2010	
Curtis Hussey	Johnathan / Johnny Curtis	2000–2004	
Giovanni Roselli	Johnny Heartbreaker	2004	
Unknown	Johnny Idol	1999; 2008	
Unknown	Johnny Justice	1999–2000	
Unknown	Johnny Nash	2001–2002	
Unknown	Johnny Royal	1996; 1997	
Unknown	Johnny Trendy	2003; 2004	
Unknown	Johnny Vegas	1998	
Unknown	Jones Boy	1992–1996	
Unknown	Jon Macadamia	1991	
Unknown	J. T. Dunn	2011–	
Unknown	J.T. Fox	2011	
Unknown	Jugmano #1	1991	
Unknown	Jugmano #2	1992	
Unknown	Jugmano #3	1991–1992; 1995–1996	
Unknown	Jugmano Pi	1992; 2009	
Unknown	Jugmano #4 / Julio Jugmano	1991	
Unknown	Jugmano #5	1992; 199; 41995	
Unknown	Jugmano #6		
Unknown	Jugmano #6 7/8		
Unknown	Jugmano #7	1994; 1995	
Unknown	Jugmano #8	1992; 1995	
Unknown	Jugmano #9	1995	
Unknown	Jugmano #10	1995	
Unknown	Jugmano #11		
Unknown	Jugmano #12	1996	
Unknown	Jugmano #14		
Unknown	Jugmano #17	1996	
Unknown	Jugmano #169	1992	
Unknown	Jugmano Flavio	1991	
Unknown	Jugmano Mario	1992	
Unknown	Junkyard James	1998–2000	
Unknown	Jupiter Dog		
Unknown	Justin Sane	2000	
Unknown	Justin Tunis	2010; 2011	
Unknown	Kamikaze	1996	
Unknown	Kash Knight	2000	
Unknown	Keanu the Samoan Nightmare	2010; 2014	
Unknown	Kenn Phoenix	2001–2003	
Unknown	Kevin Cordeiro	2010–2011	
Unknown	Kevin E.	1993–1995	
Unknown	Kevin Karizma	2003–2004; 2008–	
Unknown	Kevin Lee Roth	1995–1996	
Unknown	Kevin Perry	2013	
Unknown	Kid Krazy	1999–2009	
Unknown	Killer Ken Combs	2013	
Unknown	KL Murphy	2002	
Unknown	Knightmare	1994–1996	
Unknown	Ko Haku	2006–	
Unknown	Kongo	2012	
Unknown	Kid Pyro / Kris Pyro	2003–	
Unknown	Kuma	2012–	
Kyle White	Kyle Storm	1996; 2000; 2003–2006; 2011	
Unknown	La Biblioteca	1999	
Unknown	La Calabaza	2011	
Unknown	La Gran Máscara	2007	
Unknown	Lance Silva / Suicidal Silva	1999; 2004	
Alexander K. Whybrow^{†}	Larry Sweeney	2004	
Unknown	Lasso McGraw	2013	
Unknown	Legion Cage	2003	
Paul Lauzon	The Agent / "Lethal" Paul Lauzon	1992; 1993; 1995–2001; 2003–	
James Maritato	Little Guido	2000	
Unknown	Lizzard Man	1994	
Unknown	Lucifer	1993	
Unknown	Lumberjake	2013–	
Unknown	The Macho Kid	1993–1997	
Unknown	Magnificent Mike	1992–1993	
Unknown	Makua	2005–	
Mark Amaral	Maniacal Mark	1991–	
Unknown	Maniac Martin	2006	
Unknown	Marc Dubois	1998	
Unknown	Marcus Hall	2003	
Unknown	Marcus K. Fabian	2007–	
Marc Bazzle	Marcus O'Middleton	2008	
Unknown	Mark Shurman	2013	
Unknown	Masked Graduate	1993	
Unknown	Masked Marauder	1994	
Unknown	Masked Ninja Andre	1993	
Unknown	Masked Ninja Pierre	1993	
Unknown	Masked Ninja Seiko	1993	
Unknown	Masky McGraw	2009–2011	
Unknown	The Master	1998	
Unknown	Matt Magnum	2009–	
Matt West	Matt Storm / Hiroshi Hasai	1995–1996; 2000–2004; 2007–	
Unknown	Matt Taven	2010	
Unknown	Matt Vandal	2001	
Unknown	Max Knight	1994–1997	
Unknown	Mayhem	1993–1996	
Unknown	M.I.A.	2011	
Unknown	Michael Sain / Psycho Mike Osbourne	2002–2003; 2006–	
Unknown	Michael Santana	2014–	
Unknown	Mighty Bosch	1996–1999	
Unknown	Mighty Mini	2003; 2005	
Unknown	Mighty Moco	2001–2004	
Unknown	Miguel the Green-thumbed Gardener	1993	
Michael Bennett	Mike Bennett	2003–2004	
Unknown	Mike Lynch	2006–	
Unknown	Mike Majors	2002	
Unknown	Mike Mayhem	2003	
Unknown	Mike McCarthy	2013	
Unknown	Mike Messier	1995–1999	
Raymond Brendli	Mike Mondo	2014–	
Unknown	Mike Paiva	2004; 2011; 2014–	
Unknown	Mike Preston	2001	
Michael Spillane	Mike Quackenbush	2004	
Unknown	Mike Steele	1999–2000	
Unknown	Mike Stryker	2000–2003	
Unknown	Million Dollar Dan	1993–1994	
Unknown	Milton Cass	2003	
Unknown	Mimic	2002	
Unknown	Mini McGraw / Rob "The Giant" Araujo	2010–	
Unknown	Moe B. Crazy		
Unknown	Moe S. Crazy		
Unknown	Monkey Man	1994	
Unknown	Moon Guy	1992–1993	
Unknown	Mr. All-Star	1993	
Unknown	Mr. Biggs	1999–2000	
Unknown	Mr. Grand Slam	1994–1995	
Unknown	Mr. Meatloaf	1994	
Unknown	Mr. Munroe	2009–	
Anthony Rufo	Mr. Troubleman / Troubleman	1996–2000	
Unknown	Mr. Tuesday Evening	2002	
Unknown	Mr. Wrestling 4	2001–	
Unknown	Mr. Wrestling 6	2001–	
Unknown	Nanuk of the North	1992–1993	
Unknown	Nero / Vinny Marseglia	2006; 2009–	
Unknown	Nicholas Night	2007–	
Unknown	Nick Logan	2007–	
Unknown	Nick Steel	2000–	
Unknown	Ninja Star	1997	
Unknown	Nok-Su-Kow	1993	
Unknown	Nomad	1995	
Unknown	Nova	1995	
Unknown	Onyx	2000–2004	
Unknown	Pacifico	2001	
Unknown	Panther Man	1992	
Unknown	Papi Cruz	2010–2011; 2013	
Unknown	Paramedic	1992	
Unknown	Paul Lombardi	2004	
Unknown	Paul Olson	2010; 2011	
Unknown	Paul Parent	1991	
Unknown	Pedro Santos	1995–1996	
Unknown	Perril		
Unknown	Pestilence	1993	
Unknown	Pete Waters	2007	
Unknown	Phoenix	2005	
Bob Shoup	The Pink Assassin	2006–	
Unknown	The Pizza Man	1995	
Unknown	The Portuguese Stallion	2001	
Unknown	The Portuguese Sun Dragon	2000–2001	
Unknown	Power-House Phil		
Unknown	The Predator	1993	
Unknown	Pretty Boy Hernandez	2000	
Unknown	PR Martinez	2003	
Unknown	Psycho	1992–1993	
Brad Dantino	The Punisher	1992–1995	
Unknown	The Puzzler	1992	
Unknown	Rack Stracken	1996	
Unknown	Radical Ronnie G.	1993	
Unknown	Ramses the Great	1993; 1995	
Unknown	Reaper	2005	
Unknown	Renegade Rancher	1992	
Unknown	Retardo	1992	
Unknown	Revelation	2002–2003	
Richard Fuller	Rick Fuller	2006–	
Unknown	Rick Ramsay	2001–2004	
Unknown	Rick Silver	2000	
Unknown	Rico Rodrigez	1996	
Unknown	Ring King	1996	
Unknown	Riot	2002–2004	
Unknown	Rip Morrison	1996–1998	
Unknown	Robb Johnson	1993	
Rob Elowich	Robbie Ellis	1999–2003; 2007–	
Unknown	Rob Hagan	2002; 2010	
Unknown	Rob Roberts	2000	
Unknown	Rocco Abruzzi	2007–	
Unknown	Rodney's Redbarrel	1992	
Unknown	Roger Williams, MD	2011–2012	
Unknown	Rosie Gunn	1994	
Unknown	Ruy Batello	2000–2003; 2011	
Unknown	Ryan Amaral	1991–1993	
Unknown	Ryan Bobbs		
Unknown	Ryan Storm / Vertabreaker	1995–2000; 2003–2004	
Unknown	Ryan Waters	2003–2005; 2010	
Unknown	Sacataka	1996; 1998	
Unknown	Sam Hain	1995	
Unknown	Sandy Cabbage	1992	
Unknown	Scott Ledur	2014–	
Unknown	Scott Levesque	2010–	
Unknown	Scott Thomas	1994–1999	
Unknown	Scotty Hanes		
Unknown	Scotty Slade	2013–	
Unknown	Scott Z.	1991–1995	
Unknown	Sean Burke	2010; 2012–2013	
Unknown	Sergei the Sexy Soviet	1999; 2001–2002	
Unknown	The 7-11 Counter Jockey		
Unknown	Sexy Flesh Machine	1993	
John Callahan	Sergeant Muldoon	1997–1998; 2011–	
Troy Martin	Shane Douglas	2013	
Unknown	Shane Sharp	2009	
Carlos Arenas	Shane Simons	1992–1994; 1996–	Also referee
Unknown	Shane Storm	2004	
Unknown	Shawn Candido	2003–2004; 2010; 2014	
Unknown	Shawn Steel	1995	
Unknown	Shawn Williams	1991–1992	
Unknown	Shay Cash / Shay Silva	2010–	
Unknown	Short Dogg		
Unknown	Sigmund Alexander Trebek	2002	
Unknown	Silvercide / Wolverine	1997	
Unknown	Skull	1997–1998	
Unknown	Skull Basher	2009	
Unknown	Slick Johnson	2003	
Unknown	Slim Dogg		
Unknown	Slim Jim Jones	1993	
Unknown	Smoke Dogg	1994	
Unknown	Big Smudgy Cool / Smudge Baby	1996–1997	
Unknown	Sniper #1	1993	
Unknown	Sniper #2	1993	
Unknown	So-Damn Insane	1992–1993; 1995	
Unknown	Sonny 9-Ball	1991–1992	
Unknown	The Spider		
Unknown	The Squash	1992	
Unknown	The Stalker	1993–1994	
Unknown	Steamroller	1995–1999	
Unknown	Steve Savage	2000; 2004	
Unknown	Storm Kelly	1991–1992; 1995	
Unknown	Storm Trooper Gilmore	1996–1998	
Unknown	Stuart the Doll Maker	2005	
Unknown	Sub-Zero	1993–2001	
Unknown	Suicidal Youth	1997–1998	
Unknown	Super Moondog	1997	
Unknown	Tazinator	1996	
Unknown	T.C. Stalker	2006	
Unknown	Terence Butler	1995–1996; 2006; 2010–2011	
Unknown	Terminator	1993	
Unknown	Terry Draggs	1993	
Unknown	Terry Thomas	2001–2004	
Unknown	Tex McCoy	2006–	
Unknown	Thomas the Cat		
Unknown	Thrash	1999–2000	
Tim Murray	Tim Kilgore	2000–2004; 2006	
Unknown	Tim "The Shadow" Lennon	2013	
Unknown	The Titan	1992	
Unknown	Tom Zelano	1994–1995	
Unknown	Tommy Knoxville	2001	
Unknown	Tony Amoré	1998	
Anthony White	Tony Atlas	1998–1999	
Unknown	Tony Blackbird	1991	
Unknown	Tower of Chuck	1993	
Unknown	Travis Funk	2003	
Unknown	Travis Savage	1995; 2000	
Unknown	Triplelicious	2000–2007; 2010–	
Unknown	Troy Young	1997–1999	
Unknown	Tyrus	2001	
Unknown	Uncle Stu	1999	
Unknown	Universal Soldier	1998–1999; 2001	
Unknown	Universal Soldier #2	2001	
Unknown	Universal Soldier Stryfe	1999	
Unknown	Vanilla Wafer	1992	
Jason Porcaro	Vince Vicallo	2003	
Unknown	Virgin Boy		
Unknown	The Wanderer	1997–2000; 2002; 2006	
Unknown	The Warlock	1992	
Unknown	The Whispering Boo	1999	
Steve Bisson^{†}	Who's Your Daddy	1999	
Unknown	The Wilderness Man	1996	
Unknown	Woody McGraw	2004	
Unknown	XLK	2003	
Unknown	Zachary Richards	2002	
Unknown	Zach Mason	2000	
Unknown	Zack Statik	2012	

=== Female wrestlers ===
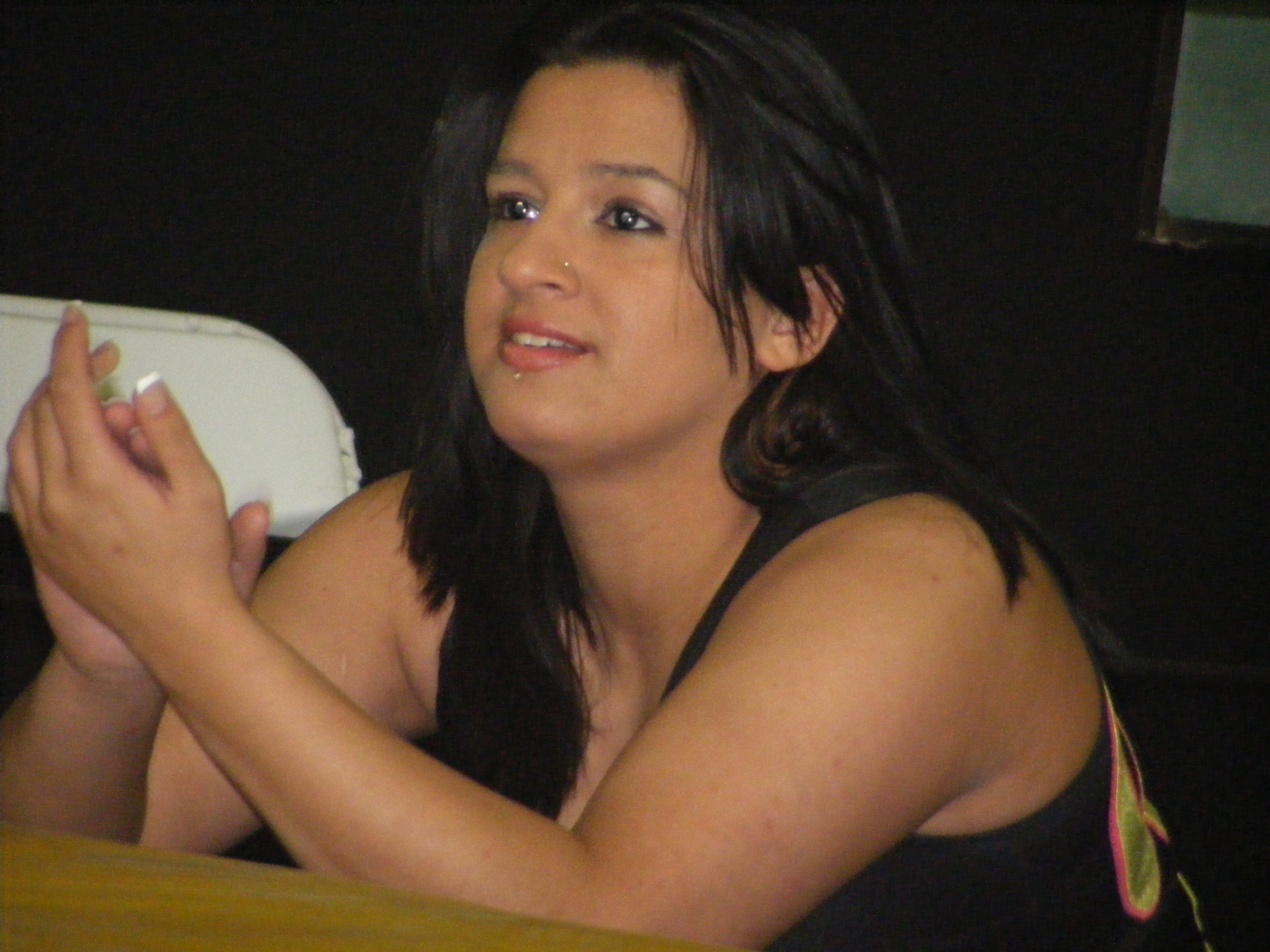
Ariel

Birth name:	Ring name(s):	Tenure:	Notes
Unknown	Athena	2002–2005	
Unknown	Alaylah Silky	2003	2003
Unknown	Gina Marie	2003–2004	
Unknown	Heidi Payne	2004	
Unknown	Ms. Psycho	2009	
Unknown	Sarah Sullivan	2004	
Unknown	Trixie	2006	
LaToya Allsopp	Luscious Latasha	2011	
Ana Rocha	Ariel	2002	
Alexandra Whitney	Amanda Storm	2000	

=== Special guests ===
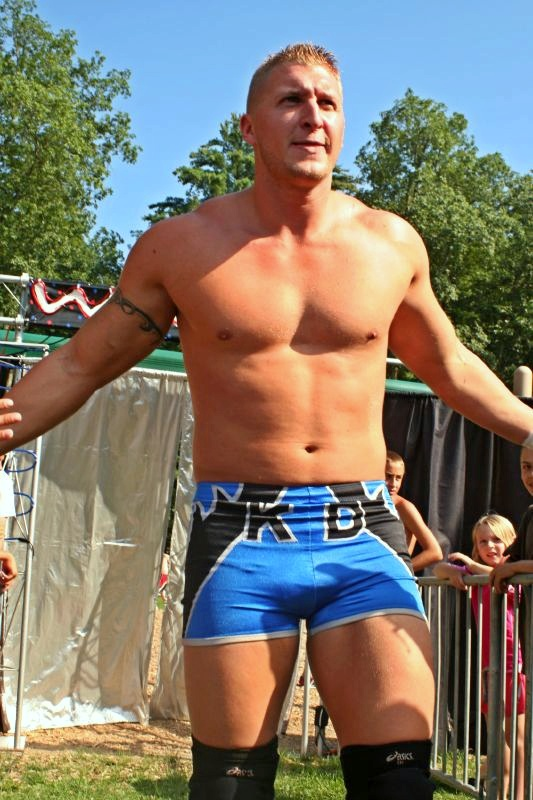
Kenny Dykstra

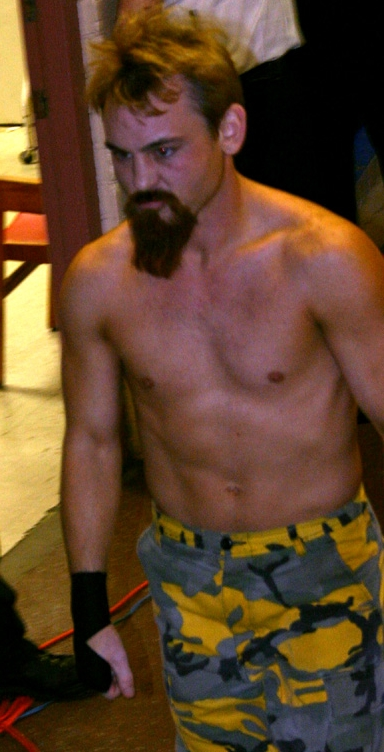
Spike Dudley

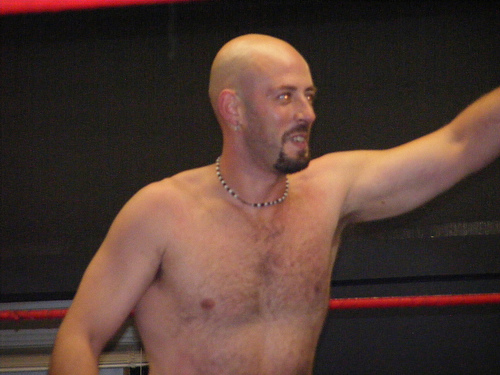
Justin Credible

Ring name(s)	Real name	Tenure(s)	
Unknown	Andrew Russo	2011	Special guest enforcer
Unknown	Kirk & Spock	1996	Local television hosts of "Spock's World"; special guests at Power-Fest 96.
Unknown	Cody Boyns	1997	Guest referee and honorary champion; WALE radio host and sponsor for the Outdoor Wrestling Federation
Kenn Doane	Kenny Dykstra	2013	
Leo Fontaine	Leo Fontaine	1998	Guest referee; Woonsocket city councilman
Matt Hyson	Spike Dudley	1998; 1999; 2000; 2013	Guest manager
Troy Martin	Shane Douglas	2013	
Peter Polaco	Justin Credible	1998	

=== Stables and tag teams ===
Tag team/Stable(s)	Members	Tenure(s)
The Airdevils	Anthony Stone & Brandon Webb	2009
The Baker Boys	Brickhouse Baker, David Baker & Devin Baker	2007–2009; 2011
The Barnyard Boys	Cotton Eye Joe & Hillbilly Tim	1995
Big Islanders	Ka Hoku & Makua	2005–2006
The Boston Bulldogs	Johnny Royal & Rip Morrison	1996–1997
The Brazilian Hug Squad	Bert Williams & Pete Waters	2007
Brutal Brigade	Bob Evans & Maniacal Mark	1991–1992
Chunky But Funky	DJ Baron & Sonny Goodspeed	2006
Clinically Inclined	Andre Lyonz & Dr. Heresy	2004–2005
The Convicts	Convict #1 & Convict #2	2010; 2014
The Cranberry Brothers	Cranberry Brother #1 & Cranberry Brother #2	1992
Crimson Dynamos	Doug Summers & Zack Statik	2011
Crush Force	Alex Payne & The Crusher	1996–1997
Da Hoodz	Davey Cash & Kris Pyro	2010
Damien and Lucifer	Damien & Lucifer	1993
The Damned	Draven & Mad Dog	2000–2001; 2003; 2006
Darkside	Brian Flynn & Shawn Williams	1991–1992
The Deadly Alliance	Atomic Mark & H-Bomb	1993–1995
The Destruction Crew	Mayhem & The Devastator	1992–1994
Double Date	Derik Destiny & Nick Steel	2007
Elements of Suicide	Cinna, Onyx & Riot	2003–2004
Emerald Fusion	Blade & Mike Paiva	2002
Extreme Heat	AK Fuego & Kid Pyro	2005–2007
Fall River Wrecking Crew	Jay A & Ryan Amaral	1992–1993
Flawless Foundation	Max Knight & Scott Thomas	1994–1995
Fryght	John 3:16 & Vertabreaker	1997
Funk n' Junk	Boogie Knight & Junkyard James	1999
The Glamorous Express	Buddy Romano & Mike Paiva	2014–
Impact Inc.	Jose Perez, Kevin Karizma & Vertabreaker	2003, 2009
The Insane One and Psycho	The Insane One & Psycho	1993
The Knights of the Realm	Daedilus Dimmak & The Mighty Bosch	1997–1999
LA Studs	Dollar D & Eric Egoh	2005–2006
Lethal Eagles	Paul Lauzon & Shane Simons	1999
The Lightning Express	Dutch Davidson & Shane Simons	1992–1993
Magnerocent	Matt Magnum & Vinny Nero	2009
The Masked Ninjas	Pierre & Andre	1993–1994
The McGraws	Masky McGraw, Mini McGraw & Ulysses McGraw	2010, 2012
100% Pure	Alex Payne & Paul Lauzon	1996, 2000, 2007
Pawtucket's Bravest	Derek Knight & Jamie Pike	2009
The Perfect Ten	Mr. Wrestling IV & Mr. Wrestling VI	2001; 2003; 2007–2008
The Pillars of Power	Sub-Zero & The Exterminator	1995–2000
P-Nutz	Charlie Bruin & Minus	2000
The Prestige	Matt Magnum & Ryan Waters	2010–2011
Rican Havoc	Don Vega & Jose Perez	2012–2013
The Score	Milton Cas & Sigmund Alexander Trebek	2002–2004
Sick and Twisted	Evan Siks & Matt Storm	2007–2008
The Sensational Blockbusters	Rob Hagan & Scott Levesque	2010
The Snipers	Sniper #1 & Sniper #2	1993
Sons of Sin	Phoenix & The Reaper	2005
The Storm Brothers	Kyle Storm & Matt Storm	1996; 2003–2006
The Stroke	Gregory Edwards & Ryan Waters	2009; 2013
The SWAT Team	The Enforcer & The Punisher	1993–1994
Team OIC	Lt. Rick Ramsay, Sgt. Fred Araujo & Sgt. Jim Tiernan	2001–2004
Team Zero-Hour		2003
The Texas Hangmen	Chainsaw Sawyer & Lasso McGraw	2013
Unwanted Souls	Crypt Keeper & The Coroner	1995
The Wild Boys	Billy King & Mike Lynch	
X-Foundation	Duke Maximum & Ryan Waters	2003–2004

=== Managers and valets ===
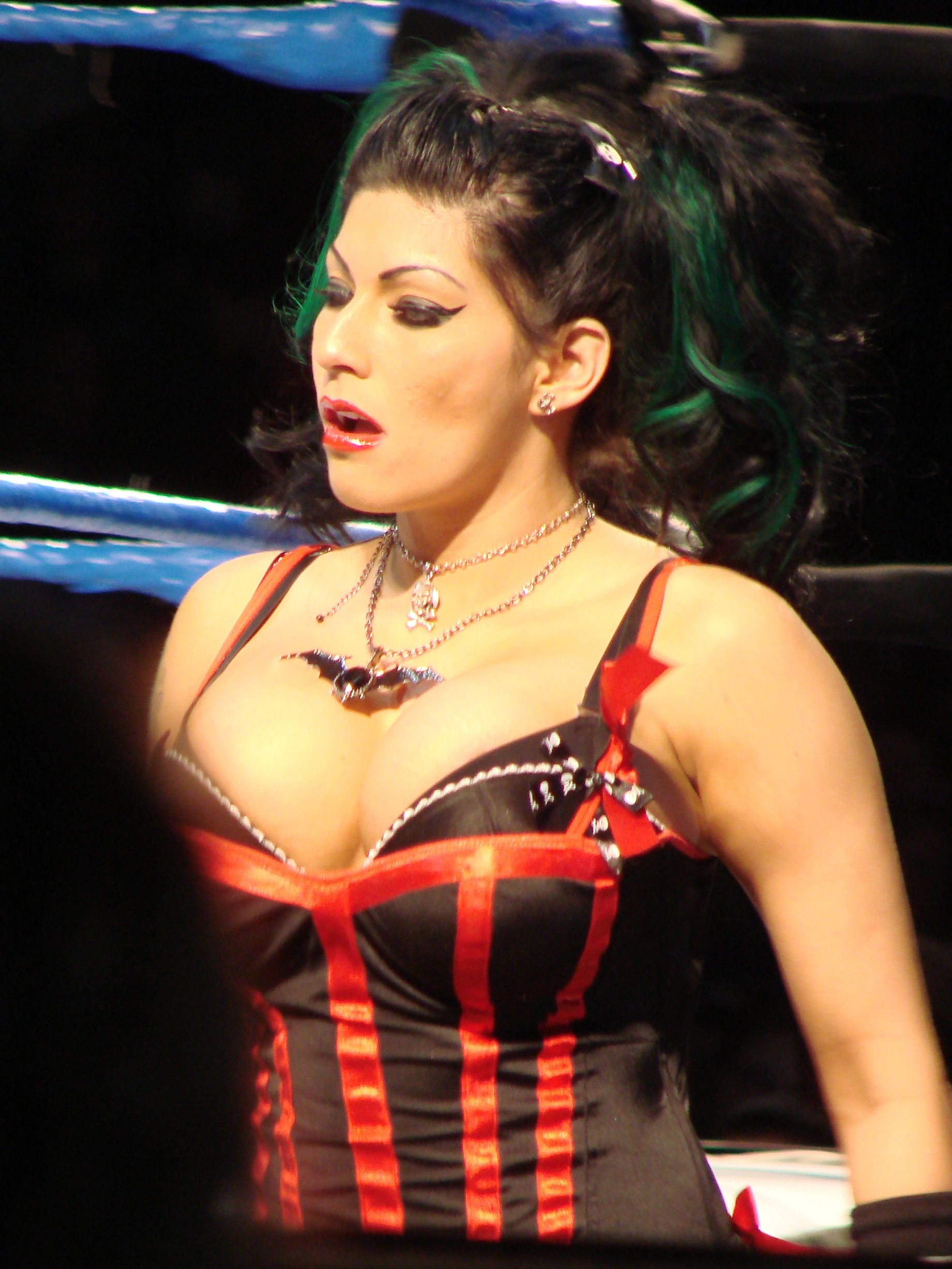
Shelly Martinez

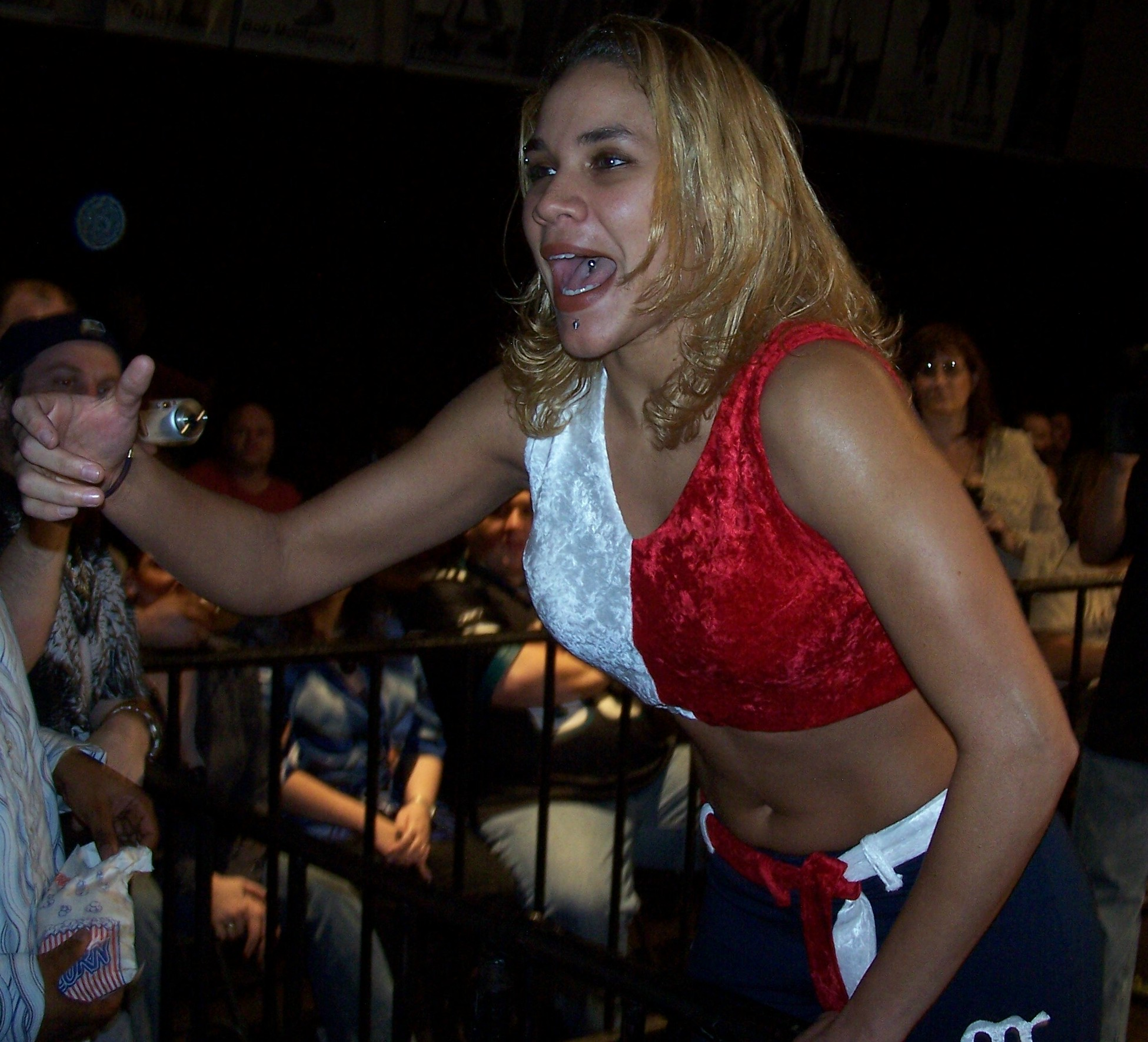
Mercedes

Birth name:	Ring name(s):	Tenure:	Notes
Unknown	Aristotle	1996–2000	Occasional wrestler
Unknown	Barley McGuinness	2000	
Unknown	Big Poppin' Daddy	1999	
Unknown	Butch Petrillo		
Unknown	The Caddy	1993–1995	Occasional wrestler
Unknown	Chi Wara	2011; 2013	
Unknown	Coach G.	1992	
Unknown	Cookies	2006	
Unknown	Crash Dogg	1994–1995	Occasional wrestler
Unknown	Daisy McGraw	2010	
Doug Cole	DC Flawless	1995–1998	Occasional wrestler
Unknown	Dean Rippley	2001	
Unknown	Desire	1997	
Unknown	Dr. Everette Payne	2000	
Unknown	The Edge		
Unknown	Gracen P. Alexander	2002; 2004	
Unknown	Grim Reaper	1993	Occasional wrestler
Unknown	Guard Dog		
Unknown	JC Marx	2000–	
Unknown	Joe Bruen	1999	
Unknown	Joey Eastman	2009	
John Cena, Sr.	John Cena, Sr.	2010; 2011; 2013	
Unknown	Johnny E. Callahan	2012–2013	
Unknown	Johnny Velour	1995–1997	Occasional wrestler
Unknown	Josh Shea	2000	
Unknown	Julius Sweet	2004; 2006	
Unknown	Kelly Brooks	2007–	
Unknown	Kiki Van Dyke, RN	2006	
Unknown	Kimaya	2010	
Unknown	The Kreep	2006	
Unknown	Ladies of the Realm (Karen, Katie & Stephanie)	1998	
Unknown	Lexxus	2004	
Unknown	The Mad Hatter	1992–1993	Occasional wrestler
Unknown	Marcus O'Middleton, Jr.	2013–	
Unknown	Marshall McNeil	2008–	Occasional wrestler
Unknown	Master Sandy	1999	
Jasmine Benitez	Mercedes	2002; 2004	
Unknown	Miss Cupid	1997–1998	
Unknown	Mistress Raven		
Unknown	The Mortician		Occasional wrestler
Unknown	Nicholas Santone	2003	
Unknown	Nurse Lesley	1993	
Unknown	Peppermint Sally	2000	
Unknown	Peter Issla	1994	
Will Murray	The Pharmacist	1993–1994	
Unknown	Pristine Christine		
Unknown	Quentin Michaels		
Unknown	Rachel Brooks	2004	
Unknown	Rebel Robbie		
Dave Jackson	Rev. Chane Brannigan	2001	
Unknown	Rich Bass	2008–	
Unknown	Rob Huff		
Unknown	The Rose	1993; 1995–1996	
Unknown	Sandy Star	1999–2000	
Unknown	Scarlett Webb		
Unknown	Scott Knight	1997–1999	
Unknown	Scotty Angel	2000	
Unknown	Shaun Ramos		
Shelly Martinez	Shelly Martinez	2014	
Unknown	Sigmund	2002	
Unknown	Simon J. Krookshank	1997–1999	
Unknown	Sir Lawrence	2011	
Unknown	Spike Dudley	2000	
Unknown	Taeler	2006–	
Unknown	Tammy the Schoolgirl	2006–	
Unknown	Templeton Peck	1999	
Unknown	Terror E. Esquire	1992–1993	
Unknown	Tim Morrisey	1996–1997	Also TV invterviewer
Tom Degnan	Tommy D.	1992–	
Unknown	Toxis	2013–	
Unknown	Tracy Michaels	1991–1994	
Unknown	Valerie Dictorian	2004	
Unknown	Valkyrie	2011	
Unknown	Vernon Somoza	2011	
Unknown	White-Trash Wendy	2013	

=== Commentators and interviewers ===
Birth name:	Ring name(s):	Tenure:	Notes
Unknown	Amy Latesa		
Unknown	Chris Basfa		
Unknown	Flavio Gonzalez		
Unknown	Jack Martin		
Unknown	Jasmine Baker		
Unknown	Martin Shan		
Unknown	Mike Elias	1995	
Unknown	Mike Giusti		
Unknown	Michael Skeldon		Guest interviewer
Unknown	Pete Rosellavich		
Unknown	Rick Stone	1995	
Unknown	Shock Wilson		
Unknown	Tex Ritter		

=== Referees ===
Birth name:	Ring name(s):	Tenure:	Notes
Unknown	Andrew Briggs		
Unknown	Andrew Fitta		
Unknown	Barbara Mahoney	2007; 2010–	
Unknown	Bill Cole	1995	
Unknown	Bill Eaton	1995–1996	
Unknown	Bob Costa		
Unknown	Bryan Couto		
Unknown	Bryce Remsburg	2004	
Unknown	Chris Mello		
Unknown	Christian Gonsalves	1991–1992	
Unknown	Danielle Davis		
Unknown	Dan Tanaka	2014–	
Unknown	Dennis Giguere	1998–	
Unknown	Dino Depasquale		
Unknown	Felix Ramos		
Unknown	Frank Parker		
Unknown	George Graffan	1998–1999; 2007	
Unknown	Jack Savage	1996–1997	
Unknown	Jeff Bixby	1996	
Unknown	Jimmy Dean	1993–1999; 2011	
Unknown	Jon Cornell	2002	
Unknown	Jose Garcia		
Unknown	J.P. Arenas	1992–1993	
Unknown	Kevin Clean		
Unknown	Kevin Garcia		
Unknown	Matt Calamare	2008–	
Unknown	Matt Mello	1991–1993	
Unknown	Matty Degnan	1992–1994	
Unknown	Michael Gomes	1993–1994	
Unknown	Mike Dutch	2000–2005	
Unknown	Mike Giusti	2000	
Unknown	Mike Santana		
Unknown	Nick Parker	1993	
Unknown	Peter B.	1999	
Unknown	Rene Menard	1995–1998; 2004; 2013	
Unknown	Rich Bass	2003–2008	
Unknown	Ryan Lucas		
Unknown	Todd Taylor		
Unknown	Tom James	2000–2010	Was appointed PLW President in 2011
Unknown	Willie Jackson	1999–	
Unknown	Zac Carter	2003–	

=== Other personal ===
Birth name:	Ring name(s):	Tenure:	Notes
Unknown	Joe Drazek	1995–1999	Ring announcer
Unknown	Joe Palardy	1993–1996	PLW President from 1995–1996
Unknown	Nicky Valois		Guest ring announcer
Unknown	Peter King	1993–1995	Ring announcer
Unknown	Pinky Johnson	1992	PLW President
Unknown	Theodore Vinicino		PLW President

== See also ==
- List of professional wrestlers
