= List of Professional Wrestling Just Tap Out personnel =

Professional Wrestling Just Tap Out is a Japanese professional wrestling promotion established in 2019. This list includes the current wrestlers who participate in their shows, along with their respective ‘unit’ (team, faction). Additional notes cover injured wrestlers, wrestlers with honors, and whether they are freelancers or outside talents.

== Roster ==
| Ring name | Real name | Unit | Notes |
|---|---|---|---|
| Aki Shizuku | Undisclosed | Kirakira Taiyo Project | |
| An Chamu | Undisclosed | Shinshu Girls Pro-Wrestling | |
| Aoi | Undislosed | JTO Girls | |
| Arata | Undisclosed | JTO Mens | Independent World Junior Heavyweight Champion |
| Azusa Inaba | Azusa Inaba | JTO Girls | New Blood Tag Team Champion |
| BM | Unknown | JKO | |
| Black Eagle | Unknown | JKO | |
| Black Changita | Unknown | JKO | |
| Black Chango | Unknown | JKO | |
| Black R | Unknown | JKO | |
| Black The Dragon | Unknown | JKO | |
| Carbell Ito | Kazumasa Ito | All Japan Pro-Wrestling | UWA World Light Heavyweight Champion |
| Chojin Yusha G Valion | Undisclosed | Braves | |
| Eagle Mask | Undisclosed | JTO Mens | |
| EX Valion | Undisclosed | Braves | |
| Fire Katsumi | Undisclosed | JTO Mens | |
| Kanon | Undisclosed | JTO Mens | |
| Madeline | Madoka Ishibashi | Diana Women's Pro-Wrestling | |
| Minoru Suzuki | Minoru Suzuki | TBA | |
| Misa Kagura | Undisclosed | JTO Girls | |
| Momoka Hanazono | Undisclosed | Free | |
| Ren Ayabe | Ren Ayabe | JTO Mens | |
| Rhythm | Undisclosed | JTO Girls | |
| Ryuya Takekura | Undisclosed | JTO Mens | |
| Sekiya | Undisclosed | JTO Mens | |
| Soma Watanabe | Soma Watanabe | Gleat | |
| Sumika Yanagawa | Undisclosed | JTO Girls | |
| Taka Michinoku | Takao Yoshida | JTO Mens | King of JTO |
| Takanori Ito | Takanori Ito | Gleat | |
| Tomoka Inaba | Tomoka Inaba | JTO Girls | |
| Yako | Undisclosed | Free | |
| Yu Iizuka | Yu Iizuka | Gleat | |
| Yuu Yamagata | Yuuko Yamagata | Freelancer | Queen of JTO |
| Yuuri | Undislosed | JTO Girls | |

== Staff ==
| Name | Role |
|---|---|
| Kumiko Tsushimi | Ring announcer |
| Yuu Shiina | Ring announcer |

== Alumni/notable guests ==
- Akari
- Cima
- Crea
- Giulia
- Kaori Yoneyama
- Kaz Hayashi
- Maika
- Mima Shimoda
- Miyako Matsumoto
- Nao Kakuta
- Hayato Tamura
- Sae
- Saori Anou
- Shoki Kitamura
- Shota
- Tae Honma

== See also ==
- List of professional wrestling rosters
