= List of former American Wrestling Federation personnel =

The American Wrestling Federation was a professional wrestling promotion based in Chicago, Illinois from 1994 to 1996. Former employees in the AWF consisted of professional wrestlers, managers, play-by-play and color commentators, announcers, interviewers and referees.

== Alumni ==
=== Male wrestlers ===
Birth name:	Ring name(s):	Tenure:	Notes
Chris Adams ^{†}	Chris Adams	1994–1995	
Douglas Becker	Adam Flash	1995	
Jon Benkowski	J.B. Trask	1996	
Tom Benninghaus	Tough Tom	1995	
Wayne Bloom	Wayne Bloom	1996	
Tom Brandi	Johnny Gunn	1995	
Lenny Carlson	Lenny Lane	1996	
Barry Darsow	Blacktop Bully	1995–1996	
John Paul Demann	John Paul / Jon Paul	1995	
John Devine	Horace the Psychopath	1996	
Wayne Farris	Honky Tonk Man	1996	
Steve Finley	Buddy Wayne	1996	
Edward Giovannetti	Ed Moretti	1996	
Todd Hecht	The Animal	1995–1996	
Jake Kemmerer	Bad Crew #1	1995	
James Manley	Jim Powers	1995	
Tim Mays	Mauler Mays	1995–1996	
James Moody	Nature Boy Steve Moody	1995–1996	
Mike Moran	Mean Mike	1995	
Don Muraco	Don Muraco	1995	
Alan Nagid	Pretty Boy Alan Nagid	1995–1996	
Charlie Norris ^{†}	Charlie Norris	1996	
Paul Olsek, Jr.	Bad Crew #2 / Rose	1995	
Bob Orton, Jr.	Bob Orton, Jr.	1994–1996	
Matt Osborne ^{†}	Doink the Clown	1995	
Bobby Patterson	Dirty Dusty Patterson	1995–1996	
Paul Perschmann ^{†}	Buddy Rose	1996	
A. J. Petrucci	Super Destroyer #1	1995	
Jack Petrucci	Super Destroyer #2	1995	
Robert Remus	Sgt. Slaughter	1994-1996	
Charley Rhoads	The Executioner	1995–1996	
Johnny Rhoads	Johnny Angel	1995–1996	
Thomas Richardson	Tommy Rich	1995	
Merced Solis	Tito Santana	1994–1996	
Doug Stahl	Super Destroyer #2	1995	
Jon Stewart	Johnny Stewart	1995	
Paul Taylor III	Terry Taylor	1995	
Kevin Wacholz	Nailz	1994-1996	
James Ware	Koko B. Ware / Koko Ware	1994–1996	
Anthony White	Tony Atlas	1995	
Chuck Williams ^{†}	Rockin' Rebel	1995	
Darren Wise	Darren Wyse	1995	
Jonathan Wisniski	Greg Valentine	1994–1996	
Tom Zenk ^{†}	Tom Zenk	1995–1996	
Unknown	Billy Blaze	1996	
Unknown	Billy Two Eagles	1995–1996	
Unknown	The Bodyguard	1996	
Unknown	Cody Hunter	1995	
Unknown	Dan Jesser	1996	
Unknown	The Hater	1996	
Unknown	Lester The Jester	1996	
Unknown	Number 14	1996	
Unknown	Ron Powers	1994	
Unknown	Steve Storm	1995	
Unknown	Sumito	1996	

=== Stables and tag teams ===
Tag team/Stable(s)	Members	Tenure(s)
Generation X		1996
The Rat Pack	General Adnan, Bob Orton Jr., Mr. Hughes, Hercules ^{†} and Manny Fernandez	
The Renegades	Jeff Gaylord and The Warlord	1995
The Road Warriors	Hawk ^{†} and Animal ^{†}	1996
The Samoan Swat Team	Samu and Little Sam	1995
The Southern Posse	Sonny Trout and Junior Thweet	1995
The Super Destroyers	Super Destroyer #1 and Super Destroyer #2	1995
The Texas Hangmen	Killer and Psycho	1995

=== Managers and valets ===
Birth name:	Ring name(s):	Tenure:	Notes
Adnan El Farthie	Sheik Adnan Al-Kassie		
John Sutton ^{†}	Oliver Humperdink		
David Webber	Aloysius Hayes	1996	
Unknown	Big Mama		
Unknown	Frankie the Bird		
Unknown	Highway Honey		
Steve Signore	Rico Suave	1995	

=== Commentators and interviewers ===
Birth name:	Ring name(s):	Tenure:	Notes
Alfred Hayes ^{†}	Lord Alfred Hayes	1996	
Melissa Hiatt	Missy Hyatt	1996	
Mick Karch	Mick Karch		
Ken Resnick	Ken Resnick	1996	
Paul Taylor III	Terry Taylor	1995	

=== Referees ===
Birth name:	Ring name(s):	Tenure:	Notes
William Sierra	Bill Alfonso		
Unknown	Billy Silverman		
Unknown	Gary Grunkee		
Unknown	Jesse Hernandez		

=== Other personnel ===
Birth name:	Ring name(s):	Tenure:	Notes
Paul Alperstein^{†}	Paul Alperstein	1994–1996	AWF President
Jim Brunzell	Jim Brunzell	1995–1996	AWF Commissioner
