= List of former Phoenix Championship Wrestling personnel =

Phoenix Championship Wrestling was a professional wrestling promotion based in Toms River, New Jersey from 2001 to 2003. Former employees in PCW consisted of professional wrestlers, managers, play-by-play and color commentators, announcers, interviewers and referees.

== Alumni ==
=== Male wrestlers ===
Birth name:	Ring name(s):	Tenure:	Notes
Luis Almodovar	Damian Adams	2002	
Prince Bandoh	Prince Nana	2002	
Jeremy Barron	Dr. Heresy	2002	
Lyle Basham	Doug Basham	2002	
Nicholas Berk	Nicky Benz	2001–2002^{CZW}	
Retesh Bhalla	Sonjay Dutt	2002–2003	
Scott Bigelow^{†}	Bam Bam Bigelow	2002	
Adam Birch	Joey Mercury	2002	
Tom Brandi	The Patriot	2001	
Michael Bucci	Nova	2001–2003	
Steven Carrasquillo	Monsta Mack	2002	
Chris Chetti	Chris Chetti	2002	
Jason Clements	Brandon K	2001	
Steve Corino	Steve Corino	2002	
Daniel Covell	Christopher Daniels	2002^{ECWA}	
Pat DiGiacomo	White Lotus	2002	
Nicholas Dinsmore	Nick Dinsmore	2002	
Kevin Dunn	Sammy Dunn	2002–2003	
Page Falkinburg	Diamond Dallas Page	2002	
Edward Fatu^{†}	Island Boy Jamal	2002	
Kevin Fertig	Seven	2002–2003	
Jonathan Figueroa	Amazing Red	2001–2002	
Christopher Ford	Crowbar / Devon Storm	2001–2003	
Marty Garner	Cham Pain	2002	
Frank Gerdelman	Frankie Kazarian	2001–2003	
Duane Gill	Gillberg	2002	
Kevin Glenn	Dr. Hurtz	2001	
Sal Graziano	Sal E. Graziano	2001	
Eddie Guerrero Llanes^{†}	Eddie Guerrero	2002	
Murray Happer	Bo Dupp	2002	
Brian Heffron	Da Blue Guy	2001	
Daniel Hollie	Damaja	2002	
Charlie Haas	Charlie Haas	2002	
Chris Hamrick	Chris Hamrick	2001–2002	
David Heath	Gangrel	2002	
Chris Jackson	Cueball Carmichael	2002	
Dylan Kage	Dylan Kage	2002	
Johnny Kashmere	Johnny Kashmere	2001–2002	
Matthew Kaye	Stryker	2002	
Jake Kemmerer	Bad Crew #1	2001	
Matt Knight	Kid Knight	2002	
Jerry Lynn	Jerry Lynn	2002	
Dan Lopez	Mafia	2002	
Tom Laughlin	Tommy Dreamer	2001	
Harley Lewis	Harley Lewis	2001–2002	
Ralph Maldonado	Rapid Fire Maldonado	2001	
Mark Marcos	Dave Marcos	2002–2003	
James Maritato	Little Guido	2002	
Tom Marquez	Prodigy	2001–2002	
Michael Mayo Jr.	Mike Kruel	2002–2003	
Jack McDonald	Big Slam	2002	
Lance McNaught	Lance Cade	2002	
Paul Olsek, Jr.	Bad Crew #2	2001	
Christopher Parks	Eric Justice	2002–2003	
Rubet, Luis	Chi Chi Cruz	2002–2003	
Julio Ramirez	Joel Maximo	2001–2002	
Kelvin Ramirez	Jose Maximo	2001–2002	
Giovanni Roselli	Giovanni Roselli	2002	
Andrew Santos	Andy Jaxx	2002–2003	
Nuufolau Seanoa	Samoa Joe	2002	
Brandon Silvestry	Low Ki	2002	
Jason Spence	Christian York	2002	
Robert Strauss	Rob Eckos	2002	
John Toland	Tank Toland	2002–2003	
Jerry Tuite^{†}	Malice / The Wall	2001–2002	
Michael Verdi^{†}	Trent Acid	2001–2003	
Billy Wiles	Bilvis Wesley	2001	
Brian Wohl	Julio Dinero	2002	
Benjamin Wood	The Prophet	2001–2002	
Unknown	Big Bobby G	2001	
Unknown	Brian Anthony	2002	
Unknown	Chino Martinez	2002	
Unknown	Chris Divine	2002	
Unknown	Curt Daniels	2002–2003	
Unknown	Dave Power	2002	
Unknown	Dean Power	2002	
Unknown	Dirk Siggler	2001	
Unknown	Donnie Bon Jovi	2001–2003	
Unknown	Earl the Pearl	2002	
Unknown	Father Ozzy	2001–2003	
Unknown	Genesis	2002	
Unknown	Hooch Hollar Boy JD	2001	
Unknown	Hooch Hollar Boy Skeeter	2001	
Unknown	John "The Tank" Tull	2002	
Unknown	"Jumbo" Joe Gunns	2002	
Unknown	Kuhl	2002	
Unknown	Little Ricky	2002–2003	
Unknown	Lupus	2001	
Unknown	Matt Vandal	2001–2003	
Unknown	Mike Preston	2002–2003	
Unknown	Quiet Storm	2002	
Unknown	Ramblin' Rich Myers	2002	
Unknown	Ric Blade	2001–2002^{CZW}	
Unknown	Rik Ratchet	2001	
Unknown	Shane Ballard	2002	
Unknown	Shannon Ballard	2002	
Unknown	Silvermane	2001–2002	
Unknown	The Slayer	2001–2003	
Unknown	Tiger Khan	2002	
Unknown	Zeig	2002	

=== Stables and tag teams ===
Tag team/Stable(s)	Members	Tenure(s)
The Backseat Boyz	Trent Acid and Johnny Kashmere	2001–2002
The Bad Crew	Bad Crew #1 and Bad Crew #2	2001
The Bad Street Boys	Joey Matthews and Christian York	2002
The Ballard Brothers	Shane Ballard and Shannon Ballard	2002
The Blue World Order	Da Blue Guy and Hollywood Nova	2001
Da Hit Squad	Monsta Mack and Mafia	2002
Divine Storm	Chris Divine and Quiet Storm	2002
Evolution	Nova and Frankie Kazarian	2001–2002
The Holy Rollers	Ramblin' Rich Myers and Earl the Pearl	2002
The Hooch Hollar Boys	Hooch Hollar Boy JD and Hooch Hollar Boy Skeeter	2001
Kappa Tegga Kappa	Andy Jaxx and Curt Daniels	2002–2003
The Matrix	Kuhl and Zeig	2002
The Moxie Family	Romeo Roselli, Damian Adams and Rob Eckos	2002
The Power Company	Dave Power and Dean Power	2002
Precious Metal	Mike Preston and Tank Tolland	2002
Revolution	Damaja and Doug Basham	2002
The Roadies	Sammy Dunn and Dave Marcos	2002–2003
The S.A.T.	Jose Maximo and Joel Maximo	2001–2002
The United Nations	Tiger Khan and The Prophet	2002–2003

=== Managers and valets ===
Birth name:	Ring name(s):	Tenure:	Notes
Cathy Corino	Allison Danger	2001	
Lou D'Angeli	Lou E. Dangerously	2001	
Kara Drew	Kara Slice	2002	
Mickie James	Alexis Laree	2002	

=== Commentators and interviewers ===
Birth name:	Ring name(s):	Tenure:	Notes
Unknown	Eric McHugh		Color commentator
Unknown	Gerry Straus		Color commentator
Stephen Michael Peton +	Steven Michael Peyton		Play-by-play announcer

=== Referees ===
Birth name:	Ring name(s):	Tenure:	Notes
Unknown	Mike Kehner	Senior referee	
Unknown	Sonny Ocho		
Unknown	S.P. Anderson		

=== Other personnel ===
Birth name:	Ring name(s):	Tenure:	Notes
Don Bucci	Donnie B.	2001–2003	Promoter
Kevin Glenn	Dr. Hurtz	2001–2002	PCW Commissioner
Unknown	Black Belt Dudley		PCW Head Of Security

Notes
^{†} Indicates they are deceased.
^{‡} Indicates they died while they were employed with Phoenix Championship Wrestling.
^{CZW} Indicates they were part of a talent exchange with Combat Zone Wrestling.
^{ECWA} Indicates they were part of a talent exchange with the East Coast Wrestling Association.
^{OVW} Indicates they were part of a talent exchange with Ohio Valley Wrestling.
^{ROH} Indicates they were part of a talent exchange the Ring of Honor.
