= List of Westside Xtreme Wrestling personnel =

Westside Xtreme Wrestling (wXw) is a professional wrestling promotion based in Essen, Germany. wXw has been one of the leading professional wrestling promotions in Germany, and most of its events have been held in the Ruhr district, primarily in Oberhausen. Since 2013, wXw regularly tours through Germany, adding tour stops outside the country including Switzerland, the Czech Republic and the United Kingdom.

This is a list of professional wrestlers who currently work for Westside Xtreme Wrestling, as well as a list of alumni. Executive officers, referees and ring announcers are also listed.

The guest wrestlers appeared due to wXw developing working relationships with several American promotions including Pro Wrestling Guerrilla, Beyond Wrestling, Combat Zone Wrestling (CZW) and several Japanese promotions including Pro Wrestling Noah, Dramatic Dream Team and Big Japan Pro Wrestling. Through the working relationship with wXw, Big Japan's World Strong Heavyweight Championship features both the CZW and wXw logos. wXw has also maintained relationship with several European-based promotions, including British promotions Progress Wrestling.

== Roster ==
=== Active ===
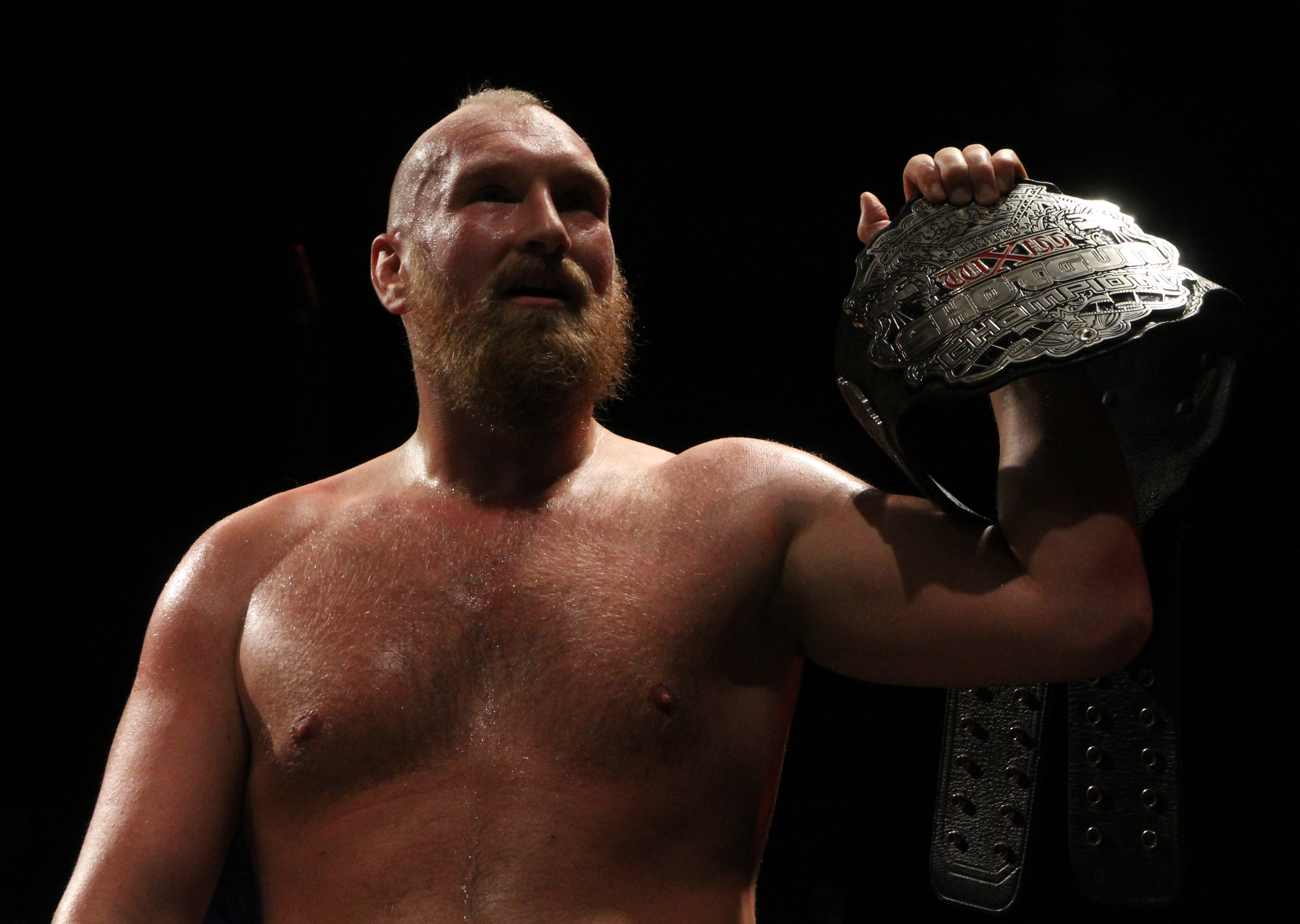
Axel "Axeman" Tischer

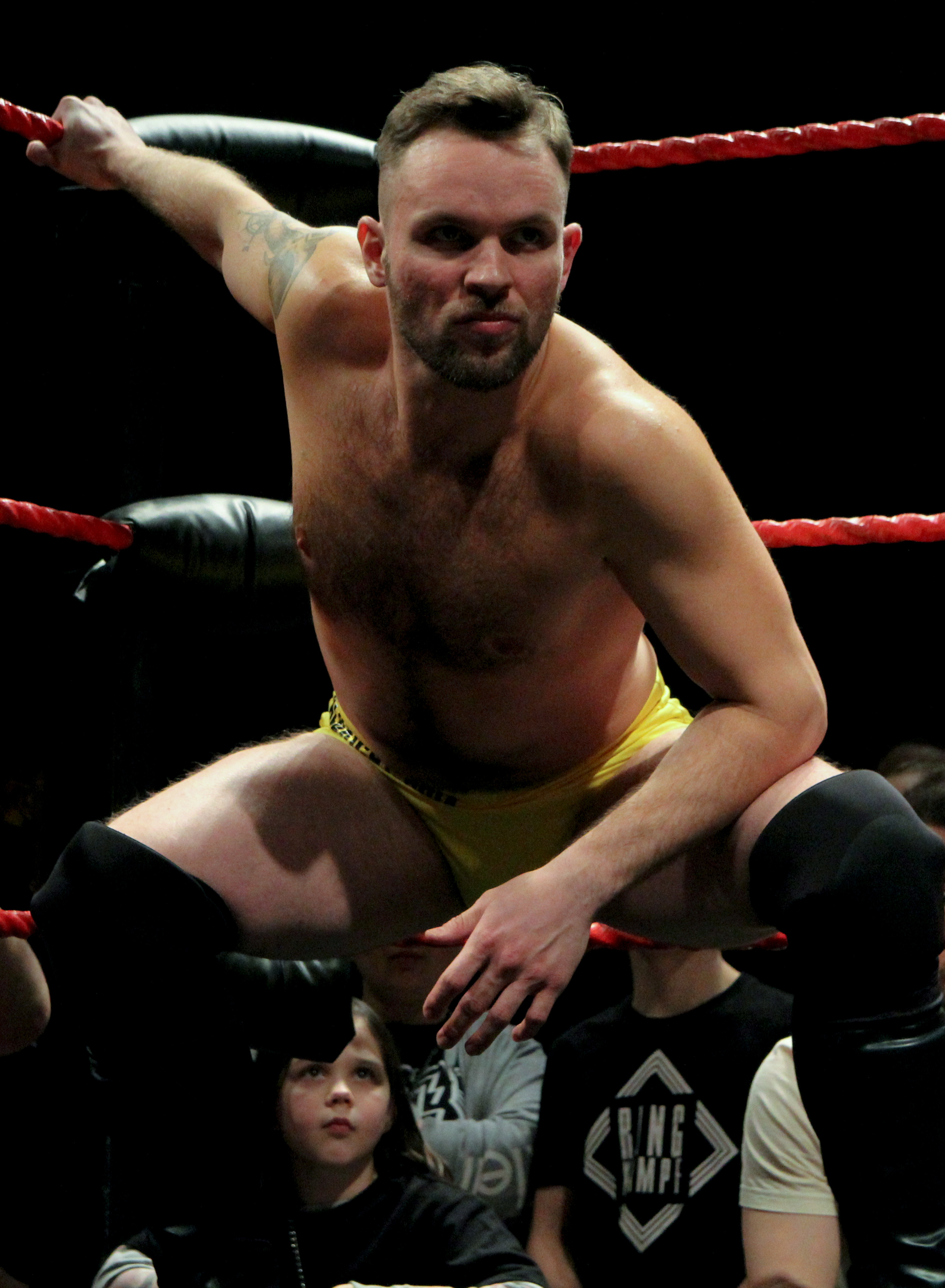
Bobby Gunns

Ring name	Real name	Notes
1 Called Manders	Steven Manders	Freelancer
Ahura	Aman Khederzadeh	
Anil Marik	Anil Yilmaz	
Axel "Axeman" Tischer	Axel Tischer	Freelancer wXw Shotgun Champion
Aliss Ink	Unknown	Freelancer
Baby Allison	Laura Fischer	
Bobby Gunns	Robert Schild	
Calypso	Calypso Brunel	
Danny Fray	Unknown	
Dennis "Cash" Dullnig	Dennis Dullnig	
Elijah Blum	Unknown	wXw Unified World Wrestling Champion
Fast Time Moodo	Unknown	
Gulyas Junior	Attila Boros	
Heisenberg	Fabian Neitzel	
Hektor Invictus	Christian Tscherpel	
Icarus	Aron Kiss	
Iva Kolasky	Emese Kolarovszki	
Jacob Crane	Jakub Kaminski	
Joseph Fenech Jr	Vincent Fenech	
Jurn Simmons	Jurn Sijtzema	
Laurance Roman	Unknown	
Levaniel	Niklas Knoche	
Maggot	Amir Wittkamp	
Marc Empire	Unknown	wXw World Tag Team Champion
Marius Al-Ani	Marius Al-Ani	
Michael Schenkenberg	Michael Horst	
Michelle Green	Unknown	
Nick Schreier	Jannik Schreier	
Nikita Charisma	Unknown	
Norman Harras	Norman Halberschmidt	Director of Sports
Peter Tihanyi	Peter Tihanyi	
Ricky Sosa	Noël Allaly	Signed to Total Nonstop Action Wrestling
Robert Dreissker	Robert Dreissker	Coach wXw World Tag Team Champion
Sebastian Hackl	Sebastian Hackl	
The Rotation	Axel Halbach	Coach
Zafar Ameen	Unknown	
Zoltan	Unknown	wXw European Champion

=== Other staff ===
Name	Job
Felix Kohlenberg	Promoter
Unknown	Creative Director
Tassilo Jung	Head of Talent Relations and Head Referee
Thommy Giesen	Ring Announcer
Sebastian Hollmichel	Commentator (German)
Christian Bischof	Colour Commentator (German)
David Bradshaw	Commentator (English)
Mett Dimassi	Commentator (English & German)
Robin Christopher Fohrwerk	Colour Commentator (English & German) & Manager
Rainer Ringer	Referee
Felix Schulz	Referee
Daniel Mallman	Interviewer

== See also ==
- List of professional wrestling promotions in Europe
