= Taishi Takizawa =

Japanese professional wrestler (born 1985)

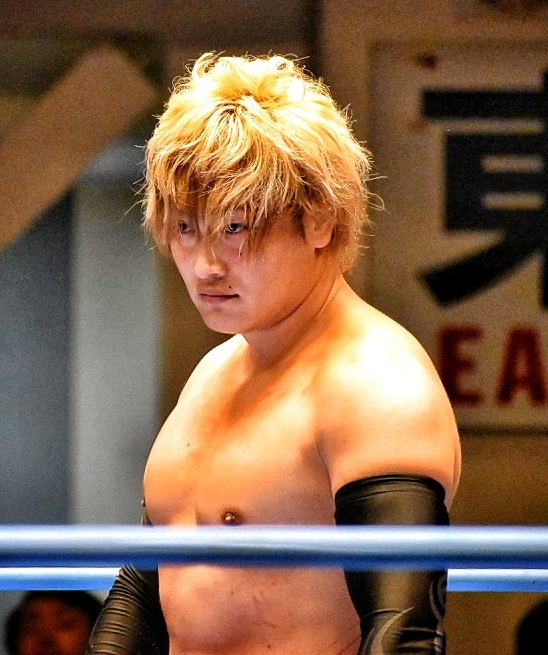
- Takizawa in September 2019

Personal information
- Born: Yuki Takizawa; September 3, 1985 (age 41) Yokosuka, Kanagawa

Professional wrestling career
- Ring name(s): Jiro; Taishi Takizawa; Taka Michinoku
- Billed height: 1.90 m (6 ft 3 in)
- Billed weight: 98 kg (216 lb)
- Billed from: Tokyo, Japan
- Trained by: Taka Michinoku
- Debut: November 19, 2006

Yuki Takizawa (滝澤 雄樹, Takizawa Yūki; born September 3, 1985) is a Japanese professional wrestler better known by the ring name Taishi Takizawa (滝澤 大志, Takizawa Taishi). Trained by Taka Michinoku, Takizawa has spent most of his career working for his Kaientai Dojo promotion. From December 2011 to June 2012, Takizawa was signed to WWE, working in its developmental territory Florida Championship Wrestling under the ring name Jiro.

== Professional wrestling career ==
=== Kaientai Dojo (2006–2011) ===
Takizawa made his professional wrestling debut for Kaientai Dojo on January 7, 2006 where he teamed with Hiro Tonai and Randy Takuya and lost to Chushin Fujisawa, Kaji Yamato and TAKU Michinoku. A week later Takizawa teamed up with Apple Miyuki to participate in K-DOJO Tag League '07 GET Block but were eliminated by Kunio Toshima & PSYCHO in the first round. On January 21 Takizawa won his first match by beating Tadanobu Fujisawa. Takizawa then participated in K-Metal League 2007 and won two and lost two matches therefore giving him two points but not enough to progress in the tournament. He was also part of the Christmas present scramble battle royal on Christmas Eve which was won by Hiro Tonai.

On January 3, 2008 Takizawa started the year with a loss when he was defeated by Omega (Makoto Oishi, MIYAWAKI, Shiori Asahi and Yuji Hino) and Naoki Tanizaki with KAZMA, Kunio Toshima, Mr. X and PSYCHO. Takizawa participated in KAIENTAI DOJO Tag League 2008 and teamed with KAZMA and lost to Boso Boy Raito and Kaji Yamato in the first round. On April, 14 he teamed with Kaji Yamato in his first championship match which was for the WEW Hardcore Tag Team Championship which was in the form of a seven team battle royal, the winners of the match were Apple Miyuki and YOSHIYA. Takizawa participated in that year's K-Metal League just like he did in 2007, after winning three of four matches and gaining six points he progressed to the finals of the tournament where he beat Hiro Tonai and therefore won the K-Metal League, this was his first accomplishment in professional wrestling. With that win he progressed further up the card and became a solid mid card wrestler and this was cemented when he participated in STRONGEST-K Tournament 2008 and he reached the semi-finals before being knocked out by Kengo Mashimo. On December 21 he lost the Taj Mahal Cup Royal Rumble.

Once again Takizawa would be part of a battle royal for the WEW Hardcore Tag Team Championship but this time teamed with Hiro Tonai and lost. After this Takizawa and Tonai would wrestle together as a tag team and would go on to have a shot at the Strongest-K Tag Team Champions Taka Michinoku and Handsome Joe but would be unsuccessful. Takizawa and Tonai would have to go on road to the strongest tag five match series where the pair would have to take on Kaientai's top tag teams which included Omega (Makoto Oishi and Shiori Asahi and KAZMA and Yuji Hino) and Handosome (TAKA Michinoku & Handsome Joe). With their test completed they participated in KAIENTAI DOJO Tag League 2009 in block A and won both their matches and therefore reaching the finals and defeated Omega (Saburo Inematsu & Yuji Hino). After winning the tournament the team took on Makoto Oishi & Shiori Asahi for the Strongest-K Tag Team Championship, but failed to capture the title. On July 20, 2009 Takizawa was part of STRONGEST-K Tournament 2009 however was defeated in the semi-finals by Shiori Asahi and then was part of a tag team royal rumble which the winners would win 500,000 Yen and was won by Monster Plant (Kaji Yamato & KAZMA). Tonai & Takizawa took on Brahman Kei and Brahman Shu for the WEW Hardcore Tag Team Championship. On November 14 he and Tonai was part of a Strongest-K Tag Team Championship number one contender three way and lost.

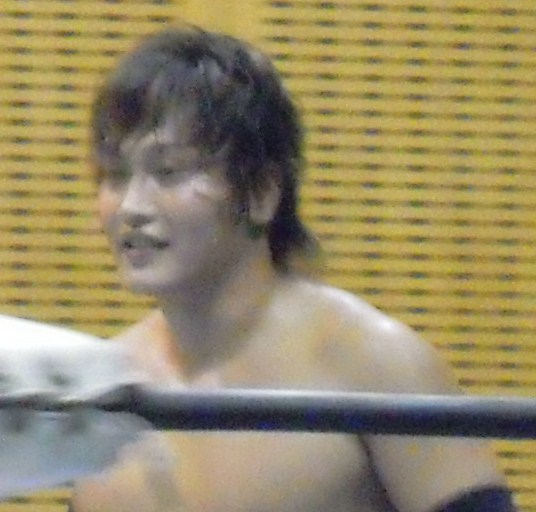
Takizawa in August 2010

In 2010 Takizawa teamed with Taka Michinoku to participate in KAIENTAI DOJO Tag League 2010 in block B, the team won two matches and therefore gained two also but because the team of Daigoro Kashiwa and Kengo Mashimo had four points also there was a finalist decision match which Kashiwa and Mashimo. On May 5, 2010 he teamed with Kaji Tomato to beat Saburo Inematsu & Yuji Hino for the Strongest-K Tag Team Championship. He would then take on KAZMA for the Strongest-K Championship, but lost. Takizawa would participate in the STRONGEST-K Tournament 2010 and was eliminated by Kengo Mashimo in the semi-finals. On August 15 Takizawa and Tomato lost their championship to Hiroki and Kengo Mashimo. They would have a rematch for titles on December 12, 2010 and on Christmas Day he took on Yuji Hino for the Strongest-K Championship, but would lose both. Takizawa and Tomato participated in KAIENTAI DOJO Tag League 2011 and reached the finals of the tournament before being eliminated by Kengo Mashimo & Ryuichi Sekine. Takizawa and Tomato then formed a stable called Silence which also had Daigoro Kashiwa and Marines Mask II. Takizawa and Tomato would participate in a one-day tournament where the winners would become the number one contenders for the IWGP Junior Heavyweight Tag Team Championship, the pair got to the final and were eliminated by Little Galaxy (Makoto Oishi and Shiori Asahi). Takizawa, Tomato and Marines Mask II participated in Chiba Six Man Tag Team Championship one day first champion decision tournament where, once again, Silence lost to Little Galaxy (Hiro Tonai, Shiori Asahi and Yuki Sato). Takizawa participated in STRONGEST-K Tournament 2011 in block A and after gaining only six points was eliminated from the tournament. For Takizawa's last match he teamed with Hiro Tonai defeated KAZMA and Shiori Asahi.

=== WWE (2011–2012) ===
After signing a developmental contract with WWE, Takizawa, working under the ring name Jiro, made his Florida Championship Wrestling (FCW) television debut on December 5, 2011, alongside fellow K-Dojo alum Sakamoto in a loss against the team of Big E Langston and Nick Rogers. Jiro went on to lose every televised FCW match he participated in. When WWE rebranded its developmental territory, FCW, into NXT Wrestling, Jiro's NXT television debut took place on the June 27 episode of the rebooted NXT taped at Full Sail University, where he lost to Seth Rollins. Jiro was released by WWE in June 2012.

=== Return to Kaientai Dojo (2012–present) ===
On August 5, 2012, Takizawa returned to Kaientai Dojo, entering the one night Nepture tournament and defeating Kaji Tomato in his first round match. After wins over Saburo Inematsu and Taka Michinoku, Takizawa defeated Hiro Tonai in the finals to win the tournament. Takizawa continued his win streak until September 19, when he unsuccessfully challenged Daisuke Sekimoto for the Strongest-K Championship. On February 24, 2013, Takizawa and Akito won the 2013 Bo-So Golden Tag Tournament, defeating the team of Kengo Mashimo and Ryuichi Sekine in the finals. Following the tournament, Takizawa was named the number one contender to Yuji Hino's Strongest-K Championship. On April 14, Takizawa defeated Hino in the main event of evolution11, Kaientai Dojo's largest annual event, to win the Strongest-K Championship for the first time. Takizawa made his first successful title defense on May 6 against Hiro Tonai. On July 2, Takizawa was stripped of the title and pulled from all upcoming events, after he had been arrested by Japanese authorities.

After being sidelined for nearly two years, Takizawa returned to the ring at a Kaientai Dojo event on May 2, 2015, losing to Taka Michinoku. On February 25, 2016, Takizawa unsuccessfully challenged Tank Nagai for the Strongest-K Championship. On March 13, Takisawa and Kotaro Yoshino defeated Nagai and Yuma to win the Bo-So Golden Tag Tournament. This led to the two winning the Strongest-K Tag Team Championship on April 17.

=== Other promotions ===
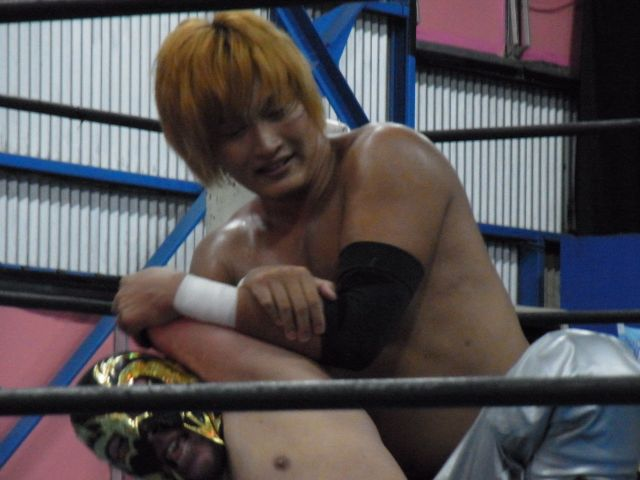
Takizawa in September 2012

On November 24, 2007 he debuted for New Japan Pro-Wrestling with KAZMA and were defeated by Kuniyoshi Wada and Takashi Uwano. On August 24, 2010, at NEVER.1, he defeated King Fale in his singles debut for NJPW.

On February 15, 2008 Takizawa debuted for All Japan Pro Wrestling and participated in the U-30 Tag Team Tournament with Kaji Yamato and were defeated by KUSHIDA and T28.

Takizawa participated in Pro Wrestling Noah's 2011 NTV G+ Cup Junior Heavyweight Tag League and was placed in block A and pair with Zack Sabre Jr. The team won two matches giving them four points which was not enough to progress further in the tournament.

On November 15, 2012, Takizawa entered New Japan's tournament to determine the inaugural NEVER Openweight Champion. After defeating Captain New Japan in his first round match, Takizawa was eliminated in his second round match on November 19 by Masato Tanaka.

On February 11, 2013, Takizawa made an appearance for the Diamond Ring promotion, teaming with Kento Miyahara, Mitsuhiro Kitamiya and Satoshi Kajiwara to defeat the reformed Voodoo Murders of "brother" Yasshi, Kazunari Murakami, Kengo Nishimura and Taru in an eight-man tag team match. After the match, Takizawa and Miyahara turned on their partners and joined Voodoo Murders.

== Personal life ==
On June 20, 2013, Takizawa was arrested in Chiba under suspicion of voyeurism, having been accused of using a smartphone to take photos of women's underwear at a local mall.

== Championships and accomplishments ==
- Kaientai Dojo/Active Advance Pro Wrestling
  - 2AW Openweight Championship (3 times, current)
  - 2AW Tag Team Championship (3 times) – with Ayumu Honda (1) and Daiju Wakamatsu (2)
  - Strongest-K Championship (2 times)
  - Strongest-K Tag Team Championship (4 times) – with Kaji Tomato (3) and Kotaro Yoshino (1)
  - Bo-So Golden Tag Tournament (2013) – with Akito
  - Bo-So Golden Tag Tournament (2016) – with Kotaro Yoshino
  - Kaientai Dojo Tag League (2009) – with Hiro Tonai
  - K-Metal League (2008)
  - Neptune Tournament (2012)
  - Best Performance Award (2012)
  - Singles Match of the Year (2017) vs. Tank Nagai on October 15
  - Tag Team Match of the Year (2015) with Kotaro Yoshino vs. Kengo Mashimo and Yuki Sato
  - Tag Team Match of the Year (2016) with Kotaro Yoshino vs. Ayato Yoshida and Kyu Mogami on November 6
  - Tag Team Match of the Year (2017) with Kaji Tomato vs. Tank Nagai and Yuki Sato on April 23
  - Wrestler of the Year (2017)
