= Tenka Sanbun no Kei: Ōmisoka New Year's Eve Special =

2009 Japanese pro-wrestling event

- Promotion(s): Big Japan Pro Wrestling; DDT Pro-Wrestling; Kaientai Dojo
- Date: December 31, 2009 (aired January 8, 2010)
- City: Tokyo, Japan
- Venue: Korakuen Hall
- Attendance: 2,010

December 31 Korakuen Hall Show chronology
← Previous; Pro-Wrestling Summit 2008	Next → Ōmisoka New Year's Eve Pro-Wrestling 2010 Countdown Special

Tenka Sanbun no Kei: Ōmisoka New Year's Eve Special (天下三分の計 大晦日年越しスペシャル, Tenka Sanbun no Kei Ōmisoka Toshikoshi Supesharu) was a Japanese professional wrestling event co-promoted by Big Japan Pro Wrestling (BJW), DDT Pro-Wrestling (DDT) and Kaientai Dojo (K-Dojo). The event featured ten matches on December 31, 2009, at Korakuen Hall in Tokyo, Japan. It aired on Fighting TV Samurai on January 8, 2010.

The event was part of the Tenka Sanbun no Kei series of shows co-produced by BJW, DDT and K-Dojo from 2007 to 2015, and the first in the New Year's Eve Pro-Wrestling brand of events.

The event was headlined by a Rumble match featuring 108 participants, the largest known to date. The number "108" is significant in the Japanese traditional celebrations on the last day of the year (Ōmisoka) as it is the number of times Buddhist temples ring their bell (bonshō) in order to cleanse the people of each of the 108 earthly temptations.

== Production ==
Other on-screen personnel
Role:	Name:
Commentators	Haruo Murata
Commentators	Eiji Tosaka
Commentators	Hirotsugu Suyama
Commentators	Ken Suzuki.txt

=== Background ===
From 2007 to 2015, BJW, DDT and K-Dojo have held the Tenka Sanbun no Kei tours featuring the three promotions in joint events in which BJW, DDT and K-Dojo held shows in the morning, afternoon and night at the same venue on the same day. Occasionally, the three promotions also held joint shows. The 2009 New Year's Eve special was the final event of the third tour that started on December 13.

=== Storylines ===
The show featured ten professional wrestling matches that resulted from scripted storylines, where wrestlers portray villains, heroes, or less distinguishable characters in the scripted events that build tension and culminate in a wrestling match or series of matches.

== Results ==
No.	Results	Stipulations	Times
1^{D}	Ryuichi Sekine, Soma Takao and Kazuki Hashimoto defeated Sasaki and Gabbana, Craig and Kim Nam-seok by submission	Six-man tag team match	8:53
2	Masa Takanashi defeated Antonio Honda	Singles match	8:07
3	Yuji Okabayashi and Takumi Tsukamoto defeated Atsushi Ohashi and Ryuichi Kawakami	Tag team match	11:23
4	Randy Takuya and Taishi Takizawa defeated Boso Boy Raito and Kaji Tomato, Gekirin (Kunio Toshima and Psycho) and Yamashita Ikka (Yoshiya and Yuu Yamagata)	Four-way tag team elimination match	4:58
5	Team New Leader (Great Kojika, Mighty Inoue, Tiger Toguchi, Goro Tsurumi and Gran Hamada) defeated Team Now Leader (Taka Michinoku, Abdullah Kobayashi, Sanshiro Takagi, Poison Sawada Julie and Men's Teioh)	5-on-5 elimination match	14:30
6	Danshoku Dino defeated Kota Ibushi, Kenny Omega and Michael Nakazawa	Four-way Falls Count Anywhere Thunder Fire Street Fight	13:07
7	Omega (Saburo Inematsu, Shiori Asahi and Miyawaki) defeated Monster Plant (Kengo Mashimo, Daigoro Kashiwa and Hiro Tonai)	Six-man tag team match	13:19
8	Ryuji Ito, Shadow WX and "Black Angel" Jaki Numazawa defeated Yuko Miyamoto, Isami Kodaka and Masashi Takeda, and Takashi Sasaki, Jun Kasai and The Winger	Three-way Fluorescent Light Tubes Deathmatch	10:57
9	Yoshihito Sasaki, Shuji Ishikawa and Yuji Hino defeated Daisuke Sekimoto, Kudo and Kazma	Six-man tag team match	21:30
10	Jun Kasai won by last eliminating The Great Kirara	108-participant New Year's Eve Rumble	1:25:12
D / – this was a dark match

=== Four-way tag team elimination match ===
Elimination	Wrestler	Team	Eliminated by	Method	Time
1	Randy Takuya	Randy Takuya and Taishi Takizawa	Psycho	Pinfall	1:55
2	Kaji Tomato	Boso Boy Raito and Kaji Tomato	Yoshiya	Pinfall	2:40
3	Boso Boy Raito	Boso Boy Raito and Kaji Tomato	Taishi Takizawa	Pinfall	4:58
Winners:	Randy Takuya and Taishi Takizawa				

=== Now Leader vs. New Leader 5-on-5 elimination match ===
Eliminated	Wrestler	Eliminated by	Method	Time
1	Men's Teioh	Goro Tsurumi	Over the top rope	5:38
2	Goro Tsurumi	Taka Michinoku	Pinfall	5:44
3	Poison Sawada Julie	Tiger Toguchi	Over the top rope	10:34
4	Tiger Toguchi	Poison Sawada Julie	Over the top rope	10:34
5	Gran Hamada	Taka Michinoku	Over the top rope	10:50
6	Abdullah Kobayashi	Mighty Inoue	Pinfall	11:30
7	Mighty Inoue	Taka Michinoku	Pinfall	11:34
8	Sanshiro Takagi	Great Kojika	Over the top rope	14:25
9	Taka Michinoku	Great Kojika	Pinfall	14:30
Winners:	Team New Leader (Great Kojika, Mighty Inoue, Tiger Toguchi, Goro Tsurumi and Gran Hamada)			

=== New Year's Eve Rumble entrances and eliminations ===
– BJW
– DDT
– K-Dojo
– Freelancer
– Winner

Draw	Entrant	Promotion	Order	Eliminated by	Method	Time	Eliminations
1	Kengo Mashimo	K-Dojo	99	Kashiwa Megane	Over the top rope	1:20:30	1
2	Yukihiro Abe	DDT	2	Kengo Mashimo	Over the top rope	0:05:30	0
3	Dark Miyako Man	K-Dojo	1	Western Tiger	Over the top rope	0:02:10	0
4	Western Tiger	BJW	6	Bambi	Over the top rope	0:10:18	0
5	Oriental Dragon	BJW	4	Brahman Shu	Over the top rope	0:06:13	0
6	Thanomsak Toba	DDT	7	Bambi	Over the top rope	0:10:58	0
7	Kaji Tomato	K-Dojo	3	Brahman Shu	Over the top rope	0:05:49	0
8	Masked Holstein	BJW	5	Taishi Takizawa	Over the top rope	0:06:34	0
9	Brahman Shu	Freelancer	14	A. Yazawa	Over the top rope	0:15:52	2
10	Taishi Takizawa	K-Dojo	8	Masashi Takeda	Over the top rope	0:11:05	1
11	Choun Shiryu	DDT	12	Kunio Toshima	Over the top rope	0:12:50	0
12	Kunio Toshima	K-Dojo	16	Daisuke Sekimoto	Over the top rope	0:16:30	2
13	"Black Angel" Jaki Numazawa	BJW	9	The Winger	Over the top rope	0:11:42	0
14	Kankuro Hoshino	BJW	10	The Winger	Over the top rope	0:11:46	0
15	Bambi	K-Dojo	11	The Winger	Over the top rope	0:12:02	2
16	Masashi Takeda	BJW	15	Daisuke Sekimoto	Over the top rope	0:16:25	1
17	The Winger	BJW	24	Poison Sawada Julie	Over the top rope	0:22:30	3
18	Kim Nam-seok	K-Dojo	13	Kunio Toshima	Over the top rope	0:12:50	0
19	Miyako Man	K-Dojo	17	Daisuke Sekimoto	Over the top rope	0:16:35	0
20	Great Kojika	BJW	20	Multiple wrestlers	Over the top rope	0:17:40	3
21	Takumi Tsukamoto	BJW	18	Daisuke Sekimoto	Over the top rope	0:16:40	0
22	A. Yazawa	DDT	19	Francesco Togo	Knockout	0:17:25	1
23	Daisuke Sekimoto	BJW	36	Kota Ibushi	Pinfall	0:31:40	5
24	Francesco Togo	DDT	22	Joe	Over the top rope	0:19:28	1
25	Kazuki Hashimoto	BJW	21	Daisuke Sekimoto	Pinfall	0:17:48	0
26	Sanshiro Takagi	DDT	23	Joe	Over the top rope	0:19:50	0
27	Joe	K-Dojo	26	Poison Sawade Julie	Over the top rope	0:22:30	2
28	Kashiwa Megane	K-Dojo	25	Poison Sawade Julie	Over the top rope	0:22:30	0
29	Aku-kun	K-Dojo	28	Poison Sawade Julie	Over the top rope	0:22:50	0
30	Psycho	K-Dojo	31	Men's Teioh	Pinfall	0:29:04	0
31	Poison Sawada Julie	DDT	27	Himself	Over the top rope	0:22:50	4
32	Kudo	DDT	42	Brahman Kei	Over the top rope	0:38:18	0
33	Antonio Honda	DDT	34	Mikami	Over the top rope	0:30:20	0
34	Shining Tiger	BJW	33	Men's Teioh	Over the top rope	0:29:45	0
35	Shadow WX	BJW	32	Men's Teioh	Over the top rope	0:29:20	0
36	Qiballman	K-Dojo	29	Himself	Over the top rope	0:26:20	0
37	Shiori Asahi	K-Dojo	43	Brahman Kei	Over the top rope	0:38:18	1
38	Hiro Tonai	K-Dojo	30	Shiori Asahi	Over the top rope	0:29:02	0
39	Ryuji Ito	BJW	35	Kota Ibushi	Over the top rope	0:31:10	0
40	Men's Teioh	BJW	37	Yoshihito Sasaki	Over the top rope	0:32:10	3
41	Mikami	DDT	38	Himself	Over the top rope	0:36:40	1
42	Miyawaki	K-Dojo	48	Shining Tiger Big Buddy	Over the top rope	0:42:00	0
43	Kota Ibushi	DDT	44	Brahman Kei	Over the top rope	0:38:30	2
44	Yoshihito Sasaki	BJW	60	Masa Takanashi and Keisuke Ishii	Over the top rope	0:50:10	2
45	Gota Ihashi	DDT	39	Yasu Urano	Over the top rope	0:36:46	0
46	Madness Dragon	BJW	41	Yoshihito Sasaki	Over the top rope	0:37:40	0
47	Yasu Urano	DDT	51	Shining Tiger Big Buddy and Ken Ohka	Over the top rope	0:42:50	4
48	Daikokubo Benkei	BJW	40	Yasu Urano	Pinfall	0:36:46	0
49	Shuji Ishikawa	DDT	46	Randy Takuya	Over the top rope	0:40:30	0
50	Mobara Tanabata 7	K-Dojo	45	Toru Owashi	Over the top rope	0:39:00	0
51	Brahman Kei	Freelancer	53	Taro Rakkasei	Over the top rope	0:45:48	3
52	Toru Owashi	DDT	47	Shining Tiger Big Buddy	Over the top rope	0:42:00	1
53	Sasaki and Gabbana	DDT	65	Yuko Miyamoto	Pinfall	0:55:01	0
54	Randy Takuya	K-Dojo	49	Shining Tiger Big Buddy	Over the top rope	0:42:08	1
55	Craig	BJW	54	Yuji Hino	Over the top rope	0:46:02	0
56	Shining Tiger Big Buddy	BJW	52	Yasu Urano and Ken Ohka	Over the top rope	0:42:50	5
57	Ken Ohka	DDT	50	Yasu Urano and Shining Tiger Big Buddy	Over the top rope	0:42:50	2
58	Taro Rakkasei	K-Dojo	55	Yuji Hino	Over the top rope	0:46:12	1
59	Tomokazu Taniguchi	DDT	56	Buta Gunso	Over the top rope	0:46:30	0
60	Yuji Hino	K-Dojo	69	Kazma	Over the top rope	0:56:04	3
61	Buta Gunso	BJW	57	Kaizo Hebi Ningen Jakaider	Over the top rope	0:47:00	1
62	Kaizo Hebi Ningen Jakaider	DDT	58	Abdullah Kobayashi	Over the top rope	0:47:30	1
63	Abdullah Kobayashi	BJW	86	Toru Momowashi	Over the top rope	1:08:21	1
64	Michael Nakazawa	DDT	59	Himself	Over the top rope	0:48:05	0
65	Yuichi Taniguchi	BJW	67	Kazma	Over the top rope	0:55:30	0
66	Keisuke Ishii	DDT	63	Yuji Okabayashi	Pinfall	0:54:11	1
67	Masa Takanashi	DDT	64	Yuji Okabayashi	Pinfall	0:54:15	1
68	Ryuichi Kawakami	BJW	66	Kazma	Over the top rope	0:55:10	0
69	Ryuichi Sekine	K-Dojo	61	Himself	Over the top rope	0:51:40	0
70	Yotsukaider	K-Dojo	62	Yoshihiko	Pinfall	0:53:18	0
71	Yoshihiko	DDT	85	Toru Momowashi	Over the top rope	1:08:21	1
72	Yuji Okabayashi	BJW	71	Shawn Michaels (Antonio Honda)	Over the top rope	0:58:40	2
73	Yuko Miyamoto	BJW	72	Shawn Michaels (Antonio Honda)	Over the top rope	0:59:30	2
74	Kazma	K-Dojo	68	Yuji Hino	Over the top rope	0:56:04	3
75	Masada	BJW	78	Takagi Sanshirobinseven	Over the top rope	1:03:52	0
76	Pierre Saionji	BJW	70	Tajiri	Pinfall	0:57:41	0
77	Tajiri	Freelancer	77	Takagi Sanshirobinseven	Over the top rope	1:03:40	1
78	Shawn Michaels (Antonio Honda)	DDT	73	Yuko Miyamoto	Over the top rope	0:59:30	2
79	Taka Michinoku	K-Dojo	74	Yoshiya	Pinfall	0:59:50	0
80	Yoshiya	K-Dojo	75	Atsuo Malenko Sawada	Over the top rope	1:01:02	1
81	Globo Kamen	K-Dojo	81	O.K. Revolution	Over the top rope	1:04:30	0
82	Madness Tiger	BJW	76	Jun Kasai	Over the top rope	1:03:03	0
83	Atsuo Malenko Sawada	DDT	79	O.K. Revolution	Over the top rope	1:04:20	1
84	Jun Kasai	BJW	—	Winner	—	—	4
85	Takagi Sanshirobinseven	DDT	80	O.K. Revolution	Over the top rope	1:04:20	2
86	O.K. Revolution	DDT	83	Satoru	Pinfall	1:05:45	4
87	Satoru	BJW	82	O.K. Revolution	Pinfall	1:05:42	1
88	Kobe Megane	K-Dojo	84	Yuu Yamagata	Over the top rope	1:07:44	0
89	Kenny Omega	DDT	88	Great Kirara, Jun Kasai and Pepe Michinoku	Over the top rope	1:10:20	0
90	Yuu Yamagata	K-Dojo	87	Pepe Michinoku	Pinfall	1:09:24	1
91	Toru Momowashi	DDT	90	Marines Mask	Over the top rope	1:11:50	2
92	Pepe Michinoku	K-Dojo	93	Dick Togo	Pinfall	1:13:03	2
93	The Great Kirara	Freelancer	107	Jun Kasai	Pinfall	1:25:12	3
94	Yuki	BJW	89	The Great Kirara	Pinfall	1:10:51	0
95	Hardcore Kid Kojiro	K-Dojo	92	Dick Togo	Over the top rope	1:12:56	0
96	Marines Mask	K-Dojo	91	Dick Togo	Over the top rope	1:12:51	1
97	Dick Togo	DDT	95	Daisuke Sasaki	Pinfall	1:16:48	5
98	Danshoku Dino	DDT	106	Jun Kasai	Over the top rope	1:23:25	1
99	Daisuke Sasaki	DDT	96	Dick Togo	Pinfall	1:16:52	1
100	Tomomitsu Matsunaga	DDT	97	Yuichi	Pinfall	1:18:50	0
101	Boso Boy Raito	K-Dojo	103	Isami Kodaka	Over the top rope	1:20:52	0
102	Takashi Sasaki	BJW	94	Dick Togo	Pinfall	1:16:42	0
103	Yuichi	BJW	101	Atsushi Ohashi	Pinfall	1:20:39	3
104	Daigoro Kashiwa	K-Dojo	105	The Great Kirara	Pinfall	1:22:40	2
105	London Kid	DDT	98	Yuichi	Pinfall	1:18:50	0
106	Atsushi Ohashi	BJW	100	Yuichi	Pinfall	1:20:35	1
107	Soma Takao	DDT	102	Daigoro Kashiwa	Over the top rope	1:20:40	0
108	Isami Kodaka	DDT	104	Danshoku Dino	Over the top rope	1:21:40	1
