= NEVER (professional wrestling) =

- Logo of the NEVER events
- Promotions: New Japan Pro-Wrestling
- First event: NEVER.1
- Last event: NEVER: Shodai NEVER Musabetsu Kyu Oza Kettei Tournament Final
- Event gimmick: Showcase for new and younger talent

NEVER was a series of professional wrestling events held by New Japan Pro-Wrestling (NJPW) between August 2010 and November 2012. On July 12, 2010, NJPW officially announced the NEVER project, which was to highlight younger up-and-coming talent and outside wrestlers not signed to the promotion. It was explained that the name of the project was an acronym of the terms "New Blood", "Evolution", "Valiantly", "Eternal" and "Radical". For the events, NJPW recruited several freelancers as well as wrestlers signed to promotions such as DDT Pro-Wrestling and Kaientai Dojo. Some outsiders who became NEVER regulars included Daisuke Sasaki, Kaji Tomato, Madoka, Ryuichi Sekine and Shinobu. Kushida, who entered NEVER as a representative of the Smash promotion in February 2011, signed a NJPW contract the following month and returned to the project the following September, now representing NJPW. Three NJPW trainees; Hiromu Takahashi, Sho Tanaka and Yohei Komatsu, made their professional wrestling debuts at NEVER events. Takahashi, who debuted at NEVER.1, was the only wrestler who wrestled on all thirteen NEVER events.

On October 5, 2012, NJPW announced that NEVER was going to get its own championship, the NEVER Openweight Championship. The title was originally scheduled to be defended exclusively at NEVER events, but this plan was quickly changed and since its foundation, the title has been defended on the undercards of NJPW events. NJPW has not held a single NEVER event since the tournament, which crowned the first NEVER Openweight Champion on November 19, 2012. A second NEVER title, the NEVER Openweight 6-Man Tag Team Championship, was announced on December 21, 2015, with the first champions crowned on January 4, 2016.

On July 18, 2015, NJPW announced "Lion's Gate", a project with a theme similar to NEVER, which held its first show on February 25, 2016.

== NEVER championships ==
Championship	Current champion(s)	Reign	Date won	Days held	Location	Ref.
NEVER Openweight Championship	Aaron Wolf	2	June 14, 2026	120+	Dominion 6.14 in Osaka-jo Hall Osaka, Japan	
NEVER Openweight 6-Man Tag Team Championship	Unbound Co. (Yuto-Ice, Oskar, and Jeff Cobb)	1 (1, 1, 1)	October 12, 2026	0+	King of Pro-Wrestling Tokyo, Japan	

== Events ==
=== NEVER.1 ===
NEVER.1
- Promotion: New Japan Pro-Wrestling
- Date: August 24, 2010
- City: Tokyo, Japan
- Venue: Shin-Kiba 1st Ring
- Attendance: 300

NEVER chronology
← Previous —	Next → NEVER.2

The first NEVER event was held on August 24, 2010, in Tokyo at Shin-Kiba 1st Ring. The event featured five matches, which involved six outsiders; Taishi Takizawa from Kaientai Dojo, Kazuhiro Tamura from Style-E, Yusuke Kodama from Smash, Shinobu from 666 and freelancers Osamu Namiguchi and Madoka. The opening match of the event featured the professional wrestling debut of Hiromu Takahashi.

No.	Results	Stipulations	Times
1	Kyosuke Mikami defeated Hiromu Takahashi	Singles match	08:28
2	Taishi Takizawa defeated King Fale	Singles match	11:23
3	Ryusuke Taguchi and Taichi defeated Kazuhiro Tamura and Yusuke Kodama	Tag team match	10:50
4	Tomohiro Ishii defeated Osamu Namiguchi	Singles match	11:01
5	No Limit (Tetsuya Naito and Yujiro Takahashi) defeated Madoka and Shinobu	Tag team match	18:04

=== NEVER.2 ===
NEVER.2
- Promotion: New Japan Pro-Wrestling
- Date: September 16, 2010
- City: Osaka, Japan
- Venue: Sekaikan
- Attendance: 200

NEVER chronology
← Previous; NEVER.1	Next → NEVER.3

The second NEVER event was held on September 16, 2010, in Osaka at the Sekaikan theater. The event featured five matches, which involved five outsiders; Takuya Tomakomai from Dragon Gate, Daisuke Harada and Tadasuke from Osaka Pro Wrestling and freelancers Yohei Nakajima and Yosuke Takii.

No.	Results	Stipulations	Times
1	Kyosuke Mikami defeated Hiromu Takahashi	Singles match	06:59
2	Tama Tonga defeated King Fale	Singles match	08:12
3	Taichi and Tomoaki Honma defeated Takuya Tomakomai and Yohei Nakajima	Tag team match	12:04
4	Hirooki Goto defeated Daisuke Harada	Singles match	08:28
5	No Limit (Tetsuya Naito and Yujiro Takahashi) defeated Tadasuke and Yosuke Takii	Tag team match	14:24

=== NEVER.3 ===
NEVER.3
- Promotion: New Japan Pro-Wrestling
- Date: October 8, 2010
- City: Tokyo, Japan
- Venue: Shin-Kiba 1st Ring
- Attendance: 250

NEVER chronology
← Previous; NEVER.2	Next → NEVER.4

The third NEVER event was held on October 8, 2010, in Tokyo at Shin-Kiba 1st Ring. The event featured six matches, which involved seven outsiders; Keisuke Ishii from DDT Pro-Wrestling, Keita Yano from Battlarts, Shinobu from 666, Tomato Kaji and Taishi Takizawa from Kaientai Dojo and freelancers Daisuke Sasaki and Madoka.

No.	Results	Stipulations	Times
1	Keisuke Ishii defeated Hiromu Takahashi	Singles match	06:43
2	Tomoaki Honma defeated King Fale	Singles match	08:12
3	Tama Tonga defeated Daisuke Sasaki	Singles match	11:12
4	Tomohiro Ishii defeated Keita Yano	Singles match	13:29
5	Madoka and Shinobu defeated Kyosuke Mikami and Ryusuke Taguchi	Tag team match	17:39
6	No Limit (Tetsuya Naito and Yujiro Takahashi) defeated Tomato Kaji and Taishi Takizawa	Tag team match	16:47

=== NEVER.4 ===
NEVER.4
- Promotion: New Japan Pro-Wrestling
- Date: November 18, 2010
- City: Tokyo, Japan
- Venue: Shin-Kiba 1st Ring
- Attendance: 450

NEVER chronology
← Previous; NEVER.3	Next → NEVER.5

The fourth NEVER event was held on November 18, 2010, in Tokyo at Shin-Kiba 1st Ring. The event featured six matches, which involved six outsiders; Keisuke Ishii from DDT Pro-Wrestling, Jun Ogawauchi from Secret Base, Shinobu from 666 and freelancers Antonio Honda, Madoka and Daisuke Sasaki. The event featured Hiroyoshi Tenzan's return match, after being sidelined for fifteen months with a back injury.

No.	Results	Stipulations	Times
1	Keisuke Ishii defeated Hiromu Takahashi	Singles match	07:04
2	Tama Tonga defeated King Fale	Singles match	07:53
3	Tomoaki Honma defeated Jun Ogawauchi	Singles match	10:40
4	Tomohiro Ishii defeated Daisuke Sasaki	Singles match	11:56
5	Hiroyoshi Tenzan defeated Antonio Honda	Singles match	13:07
6	No Limit (Tetsuya Naito and Yujiro Takahashi) defeated Madoka and Shinobu	Tag team match	16:01

=== NEVER.5 ===
NEVER.5
- Promotion: New Japan Pro-Wrestling
- Date: February 24, 2011
- City: Tokyo, Japan
- Venue: Shin-Kiba 1st Ring
- Attendance: 350

NEVER chronology
← Previous; NEVER.4	Next → NEVER.6: Road to the Super Jr. 2Days Tournament

The fifth NEVER event was held on February 24, 2011, in Tokyo at Shin-Kiba 1st Ring. The event featured seven matches, which involved six outsiders; Kazuki Hirata from DDT Pro-Wrestling, Shigehiro Irie from Team Dera, Shinobu from 666, Kushida from Smash and freelancers Daisuke Sasaki and Madoka. In the opening match, Hiromu Takahashi, six months after his debut match, picked up his first professional wrestling win over Hirata.

No.	Results	Stipulations	Times
1	Hiromu Takahashi defeated Kazuki Hirata	Singles match	06:48
2	King Fale defeated Kyosuke Mikami	Singles match	09:12
3	Tomoaki Honma defeated Shigehiro Irie	Singles match	09:37
4	Ryusuke Taguchi defeated Daisuke Sasaki	Singles match	13:28
5	Yujiro Takahashi defeated Shinobu	Singles match	09:02
6	Madoka defeated Taichi	Singles match	09:44
7	Tetsuya Naito defeated Kushida	Singles match	17:30

=== NEVER.6: Road to the Super Jr. 2Days Tournament ===
NEVER.6: Road to the Super Jr. 2Days Tournament
- Promotion: New Japan Pro-Wrestling
- Date: April 7, 2011; April 8, 2011
- City: Tokyo, Japan
- Venue: Shin-Kiba 1st Ring
- Attendance: (April 7) 250 (April 8) 300

NEVER chronology
← Previous; NEVER.5	Next → NEVER.7: Go to the Next Level

The sixth NEVER event, subtitled "Road to the Super Jr. 2Days Tournament", was held over two days on April 7 and 8, 2011, in Tokyo at Shin-Kiba 1st Ring. During the events, NJPW held two single-elimination tournaments, with both winners earning spots in the 2011 Best of the Super Juniors tournament. Both events featured eight matches and thirteen outsiders; Kazuki Hirata, Keisuke Ishii, Ken Ohka and Shinichiro Tominaga from DDT Pro-Wrestling / Union Pro Wrestling, Kaji Tomato, Marines Mask and Ryuichi Sekine from Kaientai Dojo, Shinobu from 666, Kazuhiro Tamura from Style-E and freelancers Daisuke Sasaki, Madoka, Osamu Namiguchi and Tsuyoshi Kikuchi.

April 7

No.	Results	Stipulations	Times
1	Keisuke Ishii defeated Hiromu Takahashi	Singles match; first round in the Road to the Super Jr. 2Days Tournament B	08:18
2	Ryuichi Sekine defeated Kyosuke Mikami	Singles match; first round in the Road to the Super Jr. 2Days Tournament A	08:56
3	Shinobu defeated Kaji Tomato	Singles match; first round in the Road to the Super Jr. 2Days Tournament B	08:32
4	Madoka defeated Kazuki Hirata	Singles match; first round in the Road to the Super Jr. 2Days Tournament B	08:53
5	Kazuhiro Tamura defeated Marines Mask	Singles match; first round in the Road to the Super Jr. 2Days Tournament A	04:21
6	Daisuke Sasaki defeated Shinichiro Tominaga	Singles match; first round in the Road to the Super Jr. 2Days Tournament A	10:08
7	Tsuyoshi Kikuchi defeated Ken Ohka	Singles match; first round in the Road to the Super Jr. 2Days Tournament A	08:18
8	Taichi defeated Osamu Namiguchi	Singles match; first round in the Road to the Super Jr. 2Days Tournament B	08:48

April 8

No.	Results	Stipulations	Times
1	Daisuke Sasaki defeated Ryuichi Sekine	Singles match; semifinals in the Road to the Super Jr. 2Days Tournament A	05:52
2	Tsuyoshi Kikuchi defeated Kazuhiro Tamura	Singles match; semifinals in the Road to the Super Jr. 2Days Tournament A	07:14
3	Taichi defeated Keisuke Ishii	Singles match; semifinals in the Road to the Super Jr. 2Days Tournament B	04:15
4	Madoka defeated Shinobu	Singles match; semifinals in the Road to the Super Jr. 2Days Tournament B	09:13
5	Hiromu Takahashi and Kyosuke Mikami defeated Kazuki Hirata and Shinichiro Tominaga	Tag team match	10:11
6	Chaos (Gedo, Jado, Tetsuya Naito and Yujiro Takahashi) defeated Kaji Tomato, Ken Ohka, Marines Mask and Osamu Namiguchi	Eight-man tag team match	15:50
7	Daisuke Sasaki defeated Tsuyoshi Kikuchi	Singles match; finals in the Road to the Super Jr. 2Days Tournament A	14:26
8	Taichi defeated Madoka	Singles match; finals in the Road to the Super Jr. 2Days Tournament B	17:45

Road to the Super Jr. 2Days Tournament A

First round
Kyosuke Mikami	Pin
Ryuichi Sekine	08:56
Daisuke Sasaki	Pin
Shinichiro Tominaga	10:08
Tsuyoshi Kikuchi	Pin
Ken Ohka	08:18
Kazuhiro Tamura	Pin
Marines Mask	04:21

Semifinals
Ryuichi Sekine	Pin
Daisuke Sasaki	05:52
Tsuyoshi Kikuchi	Pin
Kazuhiro Tamura	07:14

Finals
Daisuke Sasaki	Pin
Tsuyoshi Kikuchi	14:26

Road to the Super Jr. 2Days Tournament B

First round
Hiromu Takahashi	Pin
Keisuke Ishii	08:18
Taichi	Pin
Osamu Namiguchi	08:48
Madoka	Pin
Kazuki Hirata	08:53
Shinobu	Pin
Kaji Tomato	08:32

Semifinals
Keisuke Ishii	Sub
Taichi	04:15
Madoka	Pin
Shinobu	09:13

Finals
Taichi	Pin
Madoka	17:45

=== NEVER.7: Go to the Next Level ===
NEVER.7: Go to the Next Level
- Promotion: New Japan Pro-Wrestling
- Date: September 21, 2011
- City: Osaka, Japan
- Venue: Sekaikan
- Attendance: 200

NEVER chronology
← Previous; NEVER.6: Road to the Super Jr. 2Days Tournament	Next → NEVER.8: Road to the Super Jr. 2Days Tournament

The seventh NEVER event, subtitled "Go to the Next Level", was held on September 21, 2011, in Osaka at the Sekaikan theater. The event featured six matches and for the first time included no outsiders.

No.	Results	Stipulations	Times
1	Ryusuke Taguchi defeated Takaaki Watanabe	Singles match	10:26
2	Yujiro Takahashi defeated Kyosuke Mikami	Singles match	08:37
3	Hideo Saito defeated King Fale	Singles match	08:19
4	Toru Yano defeated Hiromu Takahashi	Singles match	08:53
5	Hirooki Goto defeated Tama Tonga	Singles match	10:32
6	Tetsuya Naito defeated Kushida	Singles match	12:35

=== NEVER.8: Go to the Next Level ===
NEVER.8: Go to the Next Level
- Promotion: New Japan Pro-Wrestling
- Date: February 10, 2012
- City: Osaka, Japan
- Venue: Sekaikan
- Attendance: 220

NEVER chronology
← Previous; NEVER.7: Go to the Next Level	Next → NEVER.9: Road to the Super Jr. 2Days Tournament 1st.

The eighth NEVER event, also subtitled "Go to the Next Level", was held on February 10, 2012, in Osaka at the Sekaikan theater. The event featured seven matches, which involved one outsider; freelancer Shoichi Uchida. The event featured King Fale's farewell match, before going on an overseas learning excursion.

No.	Results	Stipulations	Times
1	Kushida defeated Shoichi Uchida	Singles match	08:32
2	Yoshi-Hashi defeated Takaaki Watanabe	Singles match	08:08
3	Captain New Japan defeated Gedo	Singles match	07:46
4	Toru Yano defeated Hiromu Takahashi	Singles match	06:54
5	Karl Anderson defeated Tama Tonga	Singles match	09:59
6	Yuji Nagata defeated King Fale	Singles match	08:14
7	Yujiro Takahashi defeated Tomoaki Honma	Singles match	11:48

=== NEVER.9: Road to the Super Jr. 2Days Tournament 1st. ===
NEVER.9: Road to the Super Jr. 2Days Tournament 1st.
- Promotion: New Japan Pro-Wrestling
- Date: April 13, 2012
- City: Tokyo, Japan
- Venue: Shin-Kiba 1st Ring
- Attendance: 250

NEVER chronology
← Previous; NEVER.8: Go to the Next Level	Next → NEVER.9: Road to the Super Jr. 2Days Tournament Final

NEVER.9: Road to the Super Jr. 2Days Tournament 1st. was held on April 13, 2012, in Tokyo at Shin-Kiba 1st Ring. The event saw the start of a single-elimination tournament, where the winner would earn a spot in the 2012 Best of the Super Juniors tournament. The event featured six matches, which involved six outsiders; Hiro Tonai, Kaji Tomato and Ryuichi Sekine from Kaientai Dojo, Yusuke Kodama from Wrestling New Classic (WNC) and freelancers Black Tiger and Madoka.

No.	Results	Stipulations	Times
1	Ryuichi Sekine defeated Takaaki Watanabe	Singles match; first round in the Road to the Super Jr. 2Days Tournament	07:45
2	Black Tiger defeated Yusuke Kodama	Singles match; first round in the Road to the Super Jr. 2Days Tournament	08:23
3	Hiro Tonai defeated Hiromu Takahashi	Singles match; first round in the Road to the Super Jr. 2Days Tournament	07:48
4	Madoka defeated Kaji Tomato	Singles match; first round in the Road to the Super Jr. 2Days Tournament	09:38
5	Suzuki-gun (Taichi and Taka Michinoku) defeated Gedo and Jado	Tag team match	12:50
6	Chaos (Takashi Iizuka and Toru Yano) defeated Captain New Japan and Tetsuya Naito	Tag team match	09:29

=== NEVER.9: Road to the Super Jr. 2Days Tournament Final ===
NEVER.9: Road to the Super Jr. 2Days Tournament Final
- Promotion: New Japan Pro-Wrestling
- Date: April 15, 2012
- City: Tokyo, Japan
- Venue: Shin-Kiba 1st Ring
- Attendance: 250

NEVER chronology
← Previous; NEVER.9: Road to the Super Jr. 2Days Tournament 1st.	Next → NEVER: Shodai NEVER Musabetsu Kyu Oza Kettei Tournament 1st Round

NEVER.9: Road to the Super Jr. 2Days Tournament Final was held on April 15, 2012, in Tokyo at Shin-Kiba 1st Ring. The event featured the semifinals and finals of a single-elimination tournament, where the winner would earn a spot in the 2012 Best of the Super Juniors tournament. The event featured six matches, which involved six outsiders; Hiro Tonai, Kaji Tomato and Ryuichi Sekine from Kaientai Dojo, Yusuke Kodama from Wrestling New Classic (WNC) and freelancers Black Tiger and Madoka. The winner of the tournament, Black Tiger, never entered the 2012 Best of the Super Juniors, as on May 25 NJPW publicly fired the character's performer Kazushige Nosawa, a day after he had been arrested under suspicion of smuggling cannabis.

No.	Results	Stipulations	Times
1	Madoka defeated Hiro Tonai	Singles match; semifinals in the Road to the Super Jr. 2Days Tournament	08:49
2	Black Tiger defeated Ryuichi Sekine	Singles match; semifinals in the Road to the Super Jr. 2Days Tournament	06:29
3	Yoshi-Hashi defeated Takaaki Watanabe	Singles match	09:05
4	Chaos (Gedo, Jado and Tomohiro Ishii) defeated Captain New Japan, Kaji Tomato and Yusuke Kodama	Six-man tag team match	15:02
5	Suzuki-gun (Taichi and Taka Michinoku) defeated Hiromu Takahashi and Kushida	Tag team match	14:08
6	Black Tiger defeated Madoka	Singles match; finals in the Road to the Super Jr. 2Days Tournament	09:56

Road to the Super Jr. 2Days Tournament

First round
Hiromu Takahashi	Sub
Hiro Tonai	07:48
Madoka	Pin
Kaji Tomato	09:38
Takaaki Watanabe	Pin
Ryuichi Sekine	07:45
Yusuke Kodama	Pin
Black Tiger	08:23

Semifinals
Hiro Tonai	Pin
Madoka	08:49
Ryuichi Sekine	Pin
Black Tiger	06:29

Finals
Madoka	Pin
Black Tiger	09:56

=== NEVER: Inaugural NEVER Openweight Championship Tournament 1st Round ===
NEVER: Inaugural NEVER Openweight Championship Tournament 1st Round
- Promotion: New Japan Pro-Wrestling
- Date: November 15, 2012
- City: Tokyo, Japan
- Venue: Shibuya-AX
- Attendance: 250

NEVER chronology
← Previous; NEVER.9: Road to the Super Jr. 2Days Tournament Final	Next → NEVER: Shodai NEVER Musabetsu Kyu Oza Kettei Tournament Final

NEVER: Inaugural NEVER Openweight Championship Tournament 1st Round was held on November 15, 2012, in Tokyo at Shibuya-AX. The event featured the start of a tournament to determine the inaugural NEVER Openweight Champion. The event featured nine matches, which involved six outsiders; Hiro Tonai, Kengo Mashimo, Ryuichi Sekine, Shiori Asahi and Taishi Takizawa from Kaientai Dojo and freelancer Daisuke Sasaki. Technically, Masato Tanaka was an outsider, being signed to Pro Wrestling Zero1, but due to having been a regular for NJPW for several years, he was co-billed as a representative of the NJPW stable Chaos. The opening match of the event saw the professional wrestling debut of Sho Tanaka.

No.	Results	Stipulations	Times
1	Takaaki Watanabe defeated Sho Tanaka	Singles match	04:53
2	Shiori Asahi defeated Hiromu Takahashi	Singles match; first round in the NEVER Openweight Championship tournament	06:14
3	Yoshi-Hashi defeated Ryuichi Sekine	Singles match; first round in the NEVER Openweight Championship tournament	07:14
4	Taishi Takizawa defeated Captain New Japan	Singles match; first round in the NEVER Openweight Championship tournament	07:22
5	Ryusuke Taguchi defeated Hiro Tonai	Singles match; first round in the NEVER Openweight Championship tournament	08:19
6	Tomohiro Ishii defeated Daisuke Sasaki	Singles match; first round in the NEVER Openweight Championship tournament	08:39
7	Kengo Mashimo defeated Bushi	Singles match; first round in the NEVER Openweight Championship tournament	08:02
8	Karl Anderson defeated Yujiro Takahashi	Singles match; first round in the NEVER Openweight Championship tournament	11:12
9	Masato Tanaka defeated Kushida	Singles match; first round in the NEVER Openweight Championship tournament	13:02

=== NEVER: Inaugural NEVER Openweight Championship Tournament Final ===
NEVER: Inaugural NEVER Openweight Championship Tournament Final
- Promotion: New Japan Pro-Wrestling
- Date: November 19, 2012
- City: Tokyo, Japan
- Venue: Shibuya-AX
- Attendance: 300

NEVER chronology
← Previous; NEVER: Shodai NEVER Musabetsu Kyu Oza Kettei Tournament 1st Round	Next → —

NEVER: Inaugural NEVER Openweight Championship Tournament Final was held on November 19, 2012, in Tokyo at Shibuya-AX. The event featured the second round, semifinals and finals of a tournament to determine the inaugural NEVER Openweight Champion. The event featured ten matches, involving the same wrestlers who had taken part in the "1st Round" event four days earlier. The opening match of the event saw the professional wrestling debut of Yohei Komatsu. In the main event of the show, Masato Tanaka defeated Karl Anderson to win the tournament and become the first NEVER Openweight Champion. NJPW has not held a single NEVER event since.

No.	Results	Stipulations	Times
1	Takaaki Watanabe defeated Yohei Komatsu	Singles match	06:48
2	Kengo Mashimo defeated Ryusuke Taguchi	Singles match; second round in the NEVER Openweight Championship tournament	07:54
3	Karl Anderson defeated Shiori Asahi	Singles match; second round in the NEVER Openweight Championship tournament	03:59
4	Masato Tanaka defeated Taishi Takizawa	Singles match; second round in the NEVER Openweight Championship tournament	04:28
5	Tomohiro Ishii defeated Yoshi-Hashi	Singles match; second round in the NEVER Openweight Championship tournament	06:57
6	Karl Anderson defeated Kengo Mashimo	Singles match; semifinals in the NEVER Openweight Championship tournament	06:14
7	Masato Tanaka defeated Tomohiro Ishii	Singles match; semifinals in the NEVER Openweight Championship tournament	10:47
8	Yujiro Takahashi defeated Captain New Japan	Singles match	05:55
9	Bushi, Hiromu Takahashi and Kushida defeated Daisuke Sasaki, Hiro Tonai and Ryuichi Sekine	Six-man tag team match	11:12
10	Masato Tanaka defeated Karl Anderson	Singles match; finals in the NEVER Openweight Championship tournament	14:11

NEVER Openweight Championship tournament

First round
Karl Anderson	Pin
Yujiro Takahashi	11:12
Hiromu Takahashi	Pin
Shiori Asahi	06:14
Ryusuke Taguchi	Pin
Hiro Tonai	08:19
Bushi	Pin
Kengo Mashimo	08:02
Kushida	Pin
Masato Tanaka	13:02
Captain New Japan	Pin
Taishi Takizawa	07:22
Tomohiro Ishii	Pin
Daisuke Sasaki	08:39
Yoshi-Hashi	Pin
Ryuichi Sekine	07:14

Second round
Karl Anderson	Pin
Shiori Asahi	03:59
Ryusuke Taguchi	Sub
Kengo Mashimo	07:54
Masato Tanaka	Pin
Taishi Takizawa	04:28
Tomohiro Ishii	Pin
Yoshi-Hashi	06:57

Semifinals
Karl Anderson	Pin
Kengo Mashimo	06:14
Masato Tanaka	Pin
Tomohiro Ishii	10:47

Finals
Karl Anderson	Pin
Masato Tanaka	15:12

== See also ==
- New Japan Pro-Wrestling
- Lion's Gate Project
