= Hiro Tonai =

Japanese professional wrestler

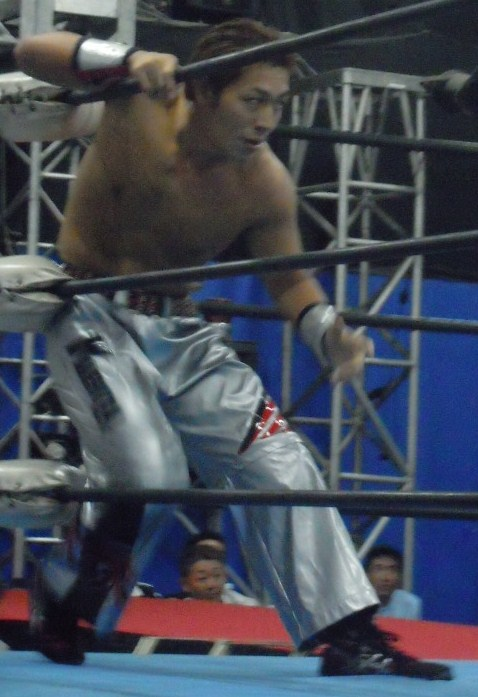
- Tonai in June 2012

Personal information
- Born: October 8, 1983 (age 43) Osaka, Japan

Professional wrestling career
- Ring name: Hiro Tonai
- Billed height: 183 cm (6 ft 0 in)
- Billed weight: 83 kg (183 lb)
- Trained by: Taka Michinoku
- Debut: 2006
- Retired: 2018

Hiro Tonai (ヒロ・トウナイ, Hiro Tōnai) is a Japanese retired professional wrestler best known for his tenure with Kaientai Dojo. He is also known for his work in various promotions of the Japanese independent scene.

== Professional wrestling career ==
=== Kaientai Dojo (2006–2018) ===
Tonai made his professional wrestling debut in Kaientai Dojo at K-DOJO Club-K Tour In Nagoya on May 26, 2006. He teamed up with Saburo Inematsu in a losing effort against Miyawaki and Yoshiya in a tag team match.

During his twelve-year tenure with the company, he won three major championships. One of these was the Strongest-K Tag Team Championship, which he first won at Club-K Super Overthrow on December 16, 2011, alongside his "Little Galaxy" stablemate Yuki Sato by defeating Ryuichi Sekine and Saburo Inematsu. He has held the titles on one more occasion, this time alongside another Little Galaxy long time tag team partner and stablemate, Shiori Asahi. Alongside him, Tonai won the titles again at KAIENTAI DOJO's 10th Anniversary in Osaka on June 17, 2012, by defeating Saburo Inematsu and Yuji Hino. Another championship he has held was the Chiba Six Man Tag Team Championship, which he won alongside stablemates Yuki Sato and Shiori Asahi at Club-K Tour In Osaka on April 30, 2011, after defeating Kaji Tomato, Marines Mask and Taishi Takizawa to become the inaugural champions. Furthermore, he won the UWA World Middleweight Championship at Club-K Super in Korakuen Hall on November 1, 2015, by defeating Kaji Tomato. He participated in various tournaments of the promotion such as the Kaientai Dojo Tag League, which he won in 2009 alongside Taishi Takizawa, the BO-SO Golden Tag Tournament, K-Metal League, and Kaioh Tournament.

Tonai retired from professional wrestling on May 6, 2018, at K-DOJO GWSP7, after a tag team match in which he teamed up with Taishi Takizawa in a losing effort against Kaji Tomato and his trainer Taka Michinoku.

=== Japanese independent circuit (2007–2018) ===
Tonai is also known for his freelancer work, having checked performances for various promotions of the Japanese independent scene. He competed in one of the largest documented professional wrestling matches, an 108-person battle royal from Tenka Sanbun no Kei: Ōmisoka New Year's Eve Special, a cross-over event promoted by Kaientai Dojo in partnership with Big Japan Pro Wrestling and DDT Pro-Wrestling on December 31, 2009. The match was won by Jun Kasai and featured various other notable wrestlers such as Thanomsak Toba, Great Kojika, Daikokubo Benkei, Sanshiro Takagi, Poison Sawada Julie, Kota Ibushi, Kenny Omega and many others. Tonai competed in another bout of this kind, a 74-person tag team match from New Year's Eve Pro-Wrestling 2011. Tonai was part of the winning team of thirty-seven and he teamed up with various wrestlers such as Abdullah Kobayashi, Daisuke Sekimoto, "Black Angel" Jaki Numazawa, Gentaro, Harashima, Shuji Ishikawa, Kaji Burdock, among others.

=== New Japan Pro Wrestling (2007, 2012–2013) ===
Tonai briefly wrestled in New Japan Pro Wrestling as a Kaientai Dojo developmental talent. He made his debut at NJPW Last Of CTU on August 26, 2007, where he teamed up with Apple Miyuki, Daigoro Kashiwa, Taku Anzawa and Teppei Ishizaka in a losing effort against the five rangers of the Control Terrorism Unit (CTU) stable. He continued to make sporadic appearances for the company on the NEVER branch of events. His first appearance on one of these events took place at NJPW NEVER.9 ~ Road To The Super Junior Tournament on April 13, 2012, where he defeated Hiromu Takahashi in the first rounds. Two days later on April 15 he fell short to Madoka in the semifinals.

Tonai participated in two of the NJPW Tokyo Game Show 2012's nights. In the first one, September 21, he teamed up with Shiori Asahi as "Little Galaxy" to defeat Ryuichi Sekine and Saburo Inematsu. On September 23, Tonai picked up a win over Sekine in singles competition. Tonai participated in the inaugural tournament of the NEVER Openweight Championship in which he fell short to Ryusuke Taguchi in the first rounds from November 15, 2012. Tonai made several appearances at the NJPW Road To The New Beginning 2013. The first took place on February 2, where he teamed up with Suzuki-gun (Minoru Suzuki and Kengo Mashimo) in a losing effort to Chaos (Kazuchika Okada, Shinsuke Nakamura and Tomohiro Ishii). It was also revealed that Tonai was briefly recruited by Michinoku into Suzuki-gun. His last appearance for NJPW took place at NJPW New Japan Road #1 on February 11, 2013, where he teamed up with Suzuki-gun (Davey Boy Smith Jr., Lance Archer and Taka Michinoku) to defeat TenKoji (Hiroyoshi Tenzan and Satoshi Kojima), Captain New Japan and Tama Tonga.

=== Pro Wrestling Noah (2012–2014) ===
As for Pro Wrestling Noah, Tonai made his debut by competing in one of the promotion's signature events, the Global Junior Heavyweight Tag League. He made his first appearance at the 2012 edition where he teamed up with Shiori Asahi. They placed themselves in the A block of the competition, where they scored a total of four points after going against the teams of Atsushi Kotoge and Taiji Ishimori, Atsushi Aoki and Kotaro Suzuki, Bobby Fish and Eddie Edwards, and Gastón Mateo and Kaiser. At the 2013 edition, Tonai teamed up with Asahi again, this time competing in the B block of the tournament where they scored a total of two points after going against Jushin Thunder Liger and Tiger Mask, Yoshinari Ogawa and Zack Sabre Jr. Roderick Strong and Slex, and Daisuke Harada and Hitoshi Kumano. Tonai and Asahi made their last appearance in the competition at the 2014 edition where they competed in the B block. They scored a total of four points after going against Daisuke Harada and Quiet Storm, Atsushi Kotoge and Taiji Ishimori, Hitoshi Kumano and Mitsuhiro Kitamiya, and Jinzo and Rocky Lobo. At NOAH One Day Cruise on May 3, 2014, Tonai and Asahi unsuccessfully challenged Atsushi Kotoge and Taiji Ishimori for the GHC Junior Heavyweight Tag Team Championship.

== Championships and accomplishments ==
- Kaientai Dojo
  - UWA World Middleweight Championship (1 time)
  - Strongest-K Tag Team Championship (2 times) – with Yuki Sato (1) and Shiori Asahi (1)
  - Chiba Six Man Tag Team Championship (1 time, inaugural) – Yuki Sato and Shiori Asahi
  - Kaientai Dojo Tag League (2009) – with Taishi Takizawa
  - Unit Special Formation Tournament (2012) – with Yuji Hino, Kaji Tomato and Jonathan Bada
