= WEW Hardcore Tag Team Championship =

Professional wrestling tag team championship

Details
- Promotion: Frontier Martial-Arts Wrestling (2000-2002); Big Japan Pro Wrestling (2002-2003); Kaientai Dojo (2005-2016)
- Date established: April 25, 2000
- Date retired: December 2016
Statistics
- First champions: Hideki Hosaka and Yoshinori Sasaki
- Most reigns: As tag team: Hideki Hosaka and Mammoth Sasaki, and Apple Miyuki and YOSHIYA (3 reigns); As individual: YOSHIYA (6 reigns)
- Longest reign: Kunio Toshima and Yuma (3,841+ days)
- Shortest reign: Randy Takuya and Saburo Inematsu (4 days)

The WEW Hardcore Tag Team Championship was a tag team hardcore wrestling championship contested in Frontier Martial-Arts Wrestling from April 2000 until FMW closed in February 2002. The title was picked up by Big Japan Pro Wrestling that same month, and remained in that promotion until late 2005, when it moved to Kaientai Dojo until 2016. There have been a total of 37 reigns and seven vacancies shared between 30 different teams consisting of 48 distinctive champions.

== Title history ==
Key
No.	Overall reign number
Reign	Reign number for the specific team—reign numbers for the individuals are in parentheses, if different
Days	Number of days held
<1	Reign lasted less than a day
+	Current reign is changing daily

No.	Champion	Championship change			Reign statistics		Notes	Ref.
No.	Champion	Date	Event	Location	Reign	Days	Notes	Ref.
Frontier Martial-Arts Wrestling
1	Hideki Hosaka and Yoshinori Sasaki	April 25, 2000	Night in Shibuya Backdraft Eve	Tokyo, Japan	1	57	Defeated Kintaro Kanemura and Willie Takayama to become the inaugural champions.	
2	The Samoans (Eddie Fatu and Matty Samu)	June 21, 2000	King of Fight 2000 tour	Tokyo, Japan	1	37		
3	Hideki Hosaka (2) and Yoshinori Sasaki (2)	July 28, 2000	King of Fight 2000 II tour	Tokyo, Japan	2	55		
4	Gedo and Jado	September 21, 2000	Flashover tour	Sapporo, Japan	1	19	This was a three-way ladder match, also involving Kintaro Kanemura and Ryuji Yamakawa.	
5	Homeless Jimmy and Supreme	October 10, 2000	Power Splash tour	Fukuoka, Japan	1	33		
6	Hideki Hosaka (3) and Mammoth Sasaki (3)	November 12, 2000	Deep Throat	Yokohama, Japan	3	56	Sasaki formerly held the title as Yoshinori Sasaki.	
7	GOEMON and Onryo	January 7, 2001	New Year Generation tour	Tokyo, Japan	1	47		
8	Kintaro Kanemura and Ryuji Yamakawa	February 23, 2001	Cluster Battle tour	Tokyo, Japan	1	282		
9	Daisuke Sekimoto and Men's Teioh	December 2, 2001	Ante Up	Yokohama, Japan	1	75	This was a title vs. title match with Sekimoto and Teioh's BJW Tag Team Championship also on the line.	
—	Vacated	February 15, 2002	—	—	—	—	Frontier Martial-Arts Wrestling officially closed on February 15, 2002 after holding its final event eleven days earlier. The title then moved to Big Japan Pro Wrestling.	
Big Japan Pro Wrestling
10	Jun Kasai and The W*INGer	March 21, 2002	Live event	Nagoya, Japan	1	72	Defeated Daisuke Sekimoto and Men's Teioh to win the vacant titles.	
—	Vacated	June 1, 2002	—	—	—	—	The titles were vacated after Kasai left Big Japan Pro Wrestling.	
11	Daikokubo Benkei and Abdullah Kobayashi	March 23, 2003	Live event	Osaka, Japan	1	7	Defeated Mad Man Pondo and Shadow WX to win the vacant titles.	
12	Ryuji Ito and Daisaku Shimoda	March 30, 2003	Live event	Kanagawa, Japan	1	30		
13	Hido and YOSHIYA	April 29, 2003	Live event	Tokyo, Japan	1	156		
—	Vacated	October 2, 2003	Fuyuki Army live event	Takaoka, Japan	—	—	The title was vacated after this title defense and revived by Kaientai Dojo in 2005.	
Kaientai Dojo
14	Apple Miyuki and YOSHIYA (2)	December 23, 2005	Live event	Chiba, Japan	1	103	Defeated Shiori Asahi and Makoto Oishi to win the vacant titles.	
15	Mike Lee, Jr. and Mr. X	April 5, 2006	Live event	Tokyo, Japan	1	28		
16	Shiori Asahi and Makoto Oishi	May 3, 2006	Live event	Chiba, Japan	1	32		
17	Taka Michinoku and TOMO Michinoku	June 4, 2006	Live event	Tokyo, Japan	1	34		
18	Apple Miyuki (2) and YOSHIYA (3)	July 8, 2006	Club-K Super Another in Osaka	Osaka, Japan	2	155		
19	Shiori Asahi (2) and Makoto Oishi (2)	December 10, 2006	Live event	Tokyo, Japan	2	455		
—	Vacated	March 9, 2008	—	—	—	—	Asahi and Oishi were stripped of the title for not defending the title for nearly a year.	
20	Apple Miyuki (3) and YOSHIYA (4)	April 13, 2008	Club-K Super Evolution 7	Tokyo, Japan	3	154	Lastly eliminated Shiori Asahi and Makoto Oishi in a seven-team battle royal to win the vacant titles.	
21	Boso Boy Raito and Boso Boy Left	September 14, 2008	Club-K Super Downtown	Tokyo, Japan	1	20		
22	Saburo Inematsu and PSYCHO	October 4, 2008	Club-K Super Outbreak	Chiba, Japan	1	63	This was a three-way match also involving KAZMA and MIYAWAKI.	
23	Hardcore Kid Kojiro and YOSHIYA (5)	December 6, 2008	Club-K Overthrow	Chiba, Japan	1	151		
24	The Brahman Brothers (Brahman Shu and Brahman Kei)	May 6, 2009	Club-K Super Necessary...	Chiba, Japan	1	315		
25	Yuji Hino and Saburo Inematsu (2)	March 17, 2010	Club-K Shinkiba	Tokyo, Japan	1	368	Also won the Strongest-K Tag Team Championship from Daigoro Kashiwa and Kengo Mashimo on April 2, 2010 at Super Evolution 8 in Tokyo.	
26	Kengo Mashimo and Ryuichi Sekine	March 20, 2011	Club-K Super It's Gonna Be...	Chiba, Japan	1	42		
27	Randy Takuya and Saburo Inematsu (3)	May 1, 2011	GWSP6	Chiba, Japan	1	4		
28	Kengo Mashimo and Ryuichi Sekine	May 5, 2011	GWSP6 FINAL CLUB-K SUPER Necessary...	Chiba, Japan	2	175		
29	Kamui and Mammoth Sasaki (4)	October 27, 2011	FREEDOMS	Tokyo, Japan	1	74		
30	The Brahman Brothers (Brahman Shu and Brahman Kei)	January 9, 2012	FREEDOMS	Tokyo, Japan	2	33		
31	Kamui (2) and Mammoth Sasaki (5)	February 11, 2012	FREEDOMS	Osaka, Japan	2	138		
—	Vacated	June 28, 2012	FREEDOMS	Tokyo, Japan	—	—	Sasaki vacated the title due to a neck injury.	
32	Kengo Mashimo (3) and YOSHIYA (6)	September 19, 2012	Club-K Super in Shinjuku Face	Tokyo, Japan	1	25		
—	Vacated	October 14, 2012	—	—	—	—	The titles were vacated due to YOSHIYA retiring from professional wrestling.	
33	Bambi and Makoto	January 5, 2014	Shinshun Tatakai Hajime 2014	Chiba, Japan	1	118	Defeated Kaji Tomato and Yuki Sato, Kengo Mashimo and Saburo Inematsu, and Daigoro Kashiwa and Ricky Fuji in a four-way match to win the vacant titles.	
34	Nasu Banderas and Ricky Fuji	May 3, 2014	GWSP4	Chiba, Japan	1	344		
35	Ryuichi Sekine (3) and Saburo Inematsu (4)	April 12, 2015	Evolution 13	Tokyo, Japan	1	203	This was a five-way match, also involving Daigoro Kashiwa and Teppei, Kunio Toshima and Yuma, and Jun Kasai and Kenji Fukimoto.	
—	Vacated	November 1, 2015	Club-K Super in Korakuen Hall	Tokyo, Japan	—	—	Saburo Inematsu vacated his half of the title under unknown circumstances.	
36	Kotaro Nasu and Ryuichi Sekine (4)	November 1, 2015	Club-K Super in Korakuen Hall	Tokyo, Japan	1	168	This was a seven-team hardcore rumble, where Nasu and Sekine defeated Saburo Inematsu and Alexander Otsuka, Ayumu Honda and Tiran Shi Sha, Yuma and Douki, Yoshiaki Yasato and Yoshihiro Douguchi, Ricky Fuji and Men's Teioh, Hi69 and Toru Sugiura to become the new champions.	
37	Magatsuki (Kunio Toshima and Yuma)	April 17, 2016	Club-K Super Evolution	Tokyo, Japan	1	228		
—	Vacated	December 2016	—	—	—	—	Toshima and Yuma split and Yuma leaves Magatsuki.	

=== Combined reigns ===
†	Indicates the current champion

Rank	Team	No. of reigns	Combined days
1	Shiori Asahi and Makoto Oishi	2	487
2	Apple Miyuki and YOSHIYA	3	412
3	Yuji Hino and Saburo Inematsu	1	368
4	The Brahman Brothers (Brahman Shu and Brahman Kei)	2	345
5	Nasu Banderas and Ricky Fuji	1	344
6	Kintaro Kanemura and Ryuji Yamakawa	1	282
7	Magatsuki (Kunio Toshima and Yuma)	1	228–258
8	Kamui and Mammoth Sasaki	2	212
9	Kengo Mashimo and Ryuichi Sekine	2	211
10	Ryuichi Sekine and Saburo Inematsu	1	203
11	Hideki Hosaka (3) and Mammoth Sasaki	3	168
11	Kotaro Nasu and Ryuichi Sekine	1	168
13	Hido and YOSHIYA	1	156
14	Hardcore Kid Kojiro and YOSHIYA	1	151
15	Bambi and Makoto	1	118
16	Daisuke Sekimoto and Men's Teioh	1	75
17	Kamui and Mammoth Sasaki	1	74
18	Jun Kasai and The W*INGer	1	72
19	Saburo Inematsu and PSYCHO	1	63
20	GOEMON and Onryo	1	47
21	The Samoans (Eddie Fatu and Matty Samu)	1	37
22	Taka Michinoku and TOMO Michinoku	1	34
23	Homeless Jimmy and Supreme	1	33
24	Ryuji Ito and Daisaku Shimoda	1	30
25	Mike Lee Jr. and Mr. X	1	28
26	Kengo Mashimo and YOSHIYA	1	25
27	Boso Boy Raito and Boso Boy Left	1	20
28	Gedo and Jado	1	19
29	Daikokubo Benkei and Abdullah Kobayashi	1	7
30	Randy Takuya and Saburo Inematsu	1	4

=== By wrestler ===
†	Indicates the current champion

Rank	Wrestler	No. of reigns	Combined days
1	YOSHIYA	6	744
2	Saburo Inematsu	4	638
3	Shiori Asahi	2	487
3	Makoto Oishi	2	487
5	Apple Miyuki	3	412
6	Ryuichi Sekine	4	385
7	Mammoth/Yoshinori Sasaki	5	380
8	Yuji Hino	1	368
9	Brahman Kei	2	345
9	Brahman Shu	2	345
11	Ricky Fuji	1	344
11	Nasu Banderas	1	344
13	Kintaro Kanemura	1	282
13	Ryuji Yamakawa	1	282
15	Kengo Mashimo	3	242
16	Kunio Toshima	1	228–258
16	Yuma	1	228–258
18	Kamui	2	212
19	Hideki Hosaka	3	168
19	Kotaro Nasu	1	168
21	Hido	1	156
22	Hardcore Kid Kojiro	1	151
23	Bambi	1	118
23	Makoto	1	118
25	Daisuke Sekimoto	1	75
25	Men's Teioh	1	75
27	Jun Kasai	1	72
27	The W*INGer	1	72
29	PSYCHO	1	63
30	GOEMON	1	47
30	Onryo	1	47
32	Eddie Fatu	1	37
32	Matty Samu	1	37
34	Taka Michinoku	1	34
34	TOMO Michinoku	1	34
36	Homeless Jimmy	1	33
36	Supreme	1	33
38	Ryuji Ito	1	30
38	Daisaku Shimoda	1	30
40	Mike Lee Jr.	1	28
40	Mr. X	1	28
42	Boso Boy Raito	1	20
42	Boso Boy Left	1	20
44	Gedo	1	19
44	Jado	1	19
46	Abdullah Kobayashi	1	7
46	Daikokubo Benkei	1	7
48	Randy Takuya	1	4

== See also ==
- Strongest-K Tag Team Championship
