= Saburo Inematsu =

Japanese wrestler (born 1979)

- Inematsu in August 2010

Personal information
- Born: 6 September 1979 (age 47) Misato, Japan

Professional wrestling career
- Ring name: Ine X Kikusaburo Saburo Inematsu Shikokuemon Saburo
- Billed height: 175 cm (5 ft 9 in)
- Billed weight: 102 kg (225 lb)
- Trained by: Taka Michinoku
- Debut: 2004
- Retired: 2017

Saburo Inematsu (稲松三郎, Inematsu Saburō) is a Japanese retired professional wrestler best known for his tenure with Kaientai Dojo, Big Japan Pro Wrestling (BJW), DDT Pro-Wrestling and other promotions from the Japanese independent scene.

== Professional wrestling career ==
=== Japanese independent circuit (2004–2017) ===
As a Kaientai Dojo talent, Inematsu often competed in cross-over events held by the Dojo in partnership with various other promotions. In the Tenka Sanbun no Kei series of events, Inematsu made his first appearance at the first edition of 2007, where he teamed up with Mr. X and Yuu Yamagata to defeat Daigoro Kashiwa, Kaji Yamato and Apple Miyuki.

Inemtsu competed in various inter-promotional "Year-End" events. At Pro-Wrestling Summit in Korakuen on December 31 2007, he teamed up eith Takashi Sasaki and Yuko Miyamoto in a losing effort against Ryuji Ito, "Black Angel" Jaki Numazawa and Naoki Tanizaki. At Pro-Wrestling Summit 2008, he teamed up with Isami Kodaka and Yuko Miyamoto in a losing effort against The Great Sasuke, Ryuji Ito and Takashi Sasaki. At Tenka Sanbun no Kei: Ōmisoka New Year's Eve Special on December 31, 2009, he teamed up with Omega stablemates Shiori Asahi and Miyawaki to defeat Monster Plant (Kengo Mashimo, Daigoro Kashiwa and Hiro Tonai). At Ōmisoka New Year's Eve Pro-Wrestling 2010 Countdown Special, Inematsu teamed up with Ryuji Ito and Abdullah Kobayashi to defeat Masashi Takeda, Isami Kodaka and Takeshi Minamino. At New Year's Eve Pro-Wrestling 2012, he competed in a Double Ring Hardcore Tables, Ladders and Chairs match won by teamed up with Jaki Numazawa and Danny Havoc in a losing effort against Masashi Takeda, Hoshitango and Masada.

In the NJPW Tokyo Show 2012, he participated in the third night of the event from September 23, where he defeated Ayumu Honda.

=== Kaientai Dojo (2004–2017) ===
Inematsu is best known for his tenure with Kaientai Dojo, promotion in which he has spent all his thirteen years of career. He was part of three different stables: Omega, Bozz Rengo and Gekirin. He won the Strongest-K Championship at K-DOJO 12th Anniversary Show on April 13, 2014, by defeating Kengo Mashimo. He is also a four-time Strongest-K Tag Team Champion, title which he won three times alongside Yuji Hino, and once alongside Ryuichi Sekine. At K-DOJO Club-K 3000 on June 25, 2011, he teamed up with Randy Takuya and Joe Aoyama to unsuccessfully challenge Little Galaxy (Hiro Tonai, Shiori Asahi and Yuki Sato) for the Chiba Six Man Tag Team Championship, the only title of the promotion Inematsu failed to win.

Inematsu retired on February 5, 2017, at K-DOJO Saburo Inematsu Retirement Show, an event promoted specially for himself where he fell short to Yuji Hino.

=== Big Japan Pro Wrestling (2004–2017) ===
Inematsu made his debut in Big Japan Pro Wrestling at a house show promoted on May 16, 2004, where he defeated Hajime Ishikawa in singles competition.

He competed in various signature events of the promotion. In the Saikyo Tag League, he made his first appearance at the 2014 edition of the tournament in which he teamed up with Ryuichi Sekine in the B block, where they scored a total of four points after competing against the teams of Abdullah Kobayashi and Ryuji Ito, Isami Kodaka and Yuko Miyamoto, Kankuro Hoshino and Masato Inaba, Brahman Kei and Brahman Shu, and Jaki Numazawa and Masashi Takeda, failing to qualify to the finals. In the Ikkitousen Deathmatch Survivor tournament, he made his first appearance at the 2013 edition where he bottomed the B block with a total of four points after competing against Isami Kodaka, Masashi Takeda, Danny Havoc, Abdullah Kobayashi and Takumi Tsukamoto. During the fifth of the 2016 edition from March 21, Inematsu unsuccessfully challenged Ryuji Ito in a deathmatch for the BJW Deathmatch Heavyweight Championship.

== Championships and accomplishments ==
- Kaientai Dojo
  - Strongest-K Championship (1 time)
  - Strongest-K Tag Team Championship (4 times) – with Yuji Hino (3) and Ryuichi Sekine (1)
  - WEW Hardcore Tag Team Championship (4 times) – with Psycho (1), Yuji Hino (1), Randy Takuya (1) and Ryuichi Sekine (1)
  - Strongest-K Tournament (2011)
