= UWA/UWF Intercontinental Tag Team Championship =

Professional wrestling tag team championship

Details
- Promotion: Universal Wrestling Association (1991–1993); Universal Lucha Libre (1991–1993); Michinoku Pro Wrestling (2001–2002); Kaientai Dojo (2002–2005)
- Date established: November 8, 1991; November 2, 2001
- Date retired: January 1, 1993; March 6, 2005
Statistics
- First champions: Punish and Crush
- Final champions: Kazma and Kengo Mashimo
- Most reigns: Team: Punish and Crush (2); Individual: Gedo (4)
- Longest reign: Mike Lee Jr. and Super-X (428 days)
- Shortest reign: Punish and Crush, Kazma and Kengo Mashimo (<1 days)

The UWA/UWF Intercontinental Tag Team Championship was a tag team championship created during the working relationship between the Mexican Universal Wrestling Association (UWA) and the Japanese Universal Lucha Libre (also called the Universal Wrestling Federation, UWF) from 1991 to 1993, when the title became inactive. The championship was revived in 2001 by Michinoku Pro Wrestling (MPW), and later moved to its final home, Kaientai Dojo (K-DOJO), the following year. The title was abandoned in 2005, when it was replaced with Kaientai Dojo's Strongest-K Tag Team Championship instead.

As it was a professional wrestling championship, the championship was not won not by actual competition, but by a scripted ending to a match determined by the bookers and match makers. (Note: Hornbaker (2016) p. 550: "Professional wrestling is a sport in which match finishes are predetermined. Thus, win–loss records are not indicative of a wrestler's genuine success based on their legitimate abilities – but on now much, or how little they were pushed by promoters") On occasion the championship was declared vacant, which meant there is no champion at that point in time. This occurred due to either a storyline, (Note: Duncan & Will (2000) p. 271, Chapter: Texas: NWA American Tag Team Title [World Class, Adkisson] "Championship held up and rematch ordered because of the interference of manager Gary Hart") or real life issues such as a champion suffering an injury or otherwise being unable to defend the championship. (Note: Duncan & Will (2000) p. 20, Chapter: (United States: 19th Century & widely defended titles – NWA, WWF, AWA, IW, ECW, NWA) NWA/WCW TV Title "Rhodes stripped on 85/10/19 for not defending the belt after having his leg broken by Ric Flair and Ole & Arn Anderson") (Note: Duncan & Will (2000) p. 201, Chapter: (Memphis, Nashville) Memphis: USWA Tag Team Title "Vacant on 93/01/18 when Spike leaves the USWA.")

== Title history ==
Key
No.	Overall reign number
Reign	Reign number for the specific team—reign numbers for the individuals are in parentheses, if different
Days	Number of days held
N/A	Unknown information
†	Championship change is unrecognized by the promotion
+	Current reign is changing daily

No.	Champion	Championship change			Reign statistics		Notes	Ref.
No.	Champion	Date	Event	Location	Reign	Days	Notes	Ref.
1	Punish and Crush	November 8, 1991	UWF show	Tokyo, Japan	1	220	Defeated Los Cowboys (Silver King and El Texano) in a tournament final to become the inaugural champions.	
2	Shu El Guerrero and Scorpio Jr.	June 15, 1992	UWF show	Sōka, Saitama, Japan	1	6		
3	Punish and Crush	June 21, 1992	UWF show	Tokyo, Japan	2	0		
—	Vacated	June 21, 1992	—	—	—	—	Punish and Crush ceased teaming immediately after winning the title, vacating the championship in the process.	
4	Bulldog K.T. (3) and Pat Tanaka	August 16, 1992	UWF show	Tokyo, Japan	1	96	Defeated Kendo and Coolie S.Z. in a tournament final to win the vacant championship.	
5	Gran Hamada and The Great Sasuke	November 20, 1992	UWF show	Osaka, Japan	1	42	Defeated Bulldog K.T. and Villano IV, who was filling in for Pat Tanaka as Tanaka had legitimately left the UWF.	
—	Deactivated	January 1, 1993	—	—	—	—	The championship was retired when the UWA/UWF working relationship ended. The championship was later revived by Michinoku Pro Wrestling (MPW) in 2001.	
6	Gedo (4) and Dick Togo	November 2, 2001	MPW show	Akita, Japan	1	50	Won the 2001 Michinoku Futaritabi Tag Team League to become the new champions.	
7	Sasuke (2) and Sasuke the Great	December 22, 2001	MPW show	Tokyo, Japan	1	152		
—	Vacated	May 23, 2002	—	—	—	—	MPW vacated the championship due a lack of title defenses from Sasuke and Sasuke the Great. The championship then moved to Kaientai Dojo (K-DOJO).	
8	Mr. X and Mr. X II	July 21, 2002	K-DOJO show	Chiba, Chiba, Japan	1	125	Defeated Minoru Fujita and Daigoro Kashiwa in a tournament final.	
9	Mike Lee Jr. and Super-X	November 23, 2002	K-DOJO show	Chiba, Chiba, Japan	1	428		
10	Teppei Ishizaka and Daigoro Kashiwa	January 25, 2004	K-DOJO show	Chiba, Chiba, Japan	1	20		
—	Vacated	February 14, 2004	—	—	—	—	Teppei Ishizaka and Daigoro Kashiwa were stripped of the titles due to making an unauthorized defense against DJ Nira and Apple Miyuki.	
†	Kengo Mashimo and Kunio Tojima	March 27, 2004	K-DOJO show	Unknown	1	0	Mashimo and Tojima defeated Hi69 in a handicap match for the vacant championship after Miyawaki, Hi69's scheduled partner, was injured. The two refused the titles after winning the match.	
—	Vacated	March 27, 2004	—	—	—	—	Kengo Mashimo and Kunio Tojima refused to be recognized as champions due to the nature of the match for the vacant championship.	
11	Teppei Ishizaka and Daigoro Kashiwa	April 25, 2004	K-DOJO show	Tokyo, Japan	2	69	Last eliminated Gentaro and Yoshiya in an eight-team elimination match.	
12	Gentaro and Yoshiya	July 3, 2004	K-DOJO show	Tokyo, Japan	1	119		
13	Ryota Chikuzen and Taka Michinoku	October 30, 2004	K-DOJO show	Chiba, Chiba, Japan	1	127		
14	Kazma and Kengo Mashimo	March 6, 2005	K-DOJO show	Chiba, Chiba, Japan	1	0	During this reign, Kazma and Kengo Mashimo also held the Strongest-K Tag Team Championship.	
—	Deactivated	March 6, 2005	—	—	—	—	The championship was abandoned and replaced with the Strongest-K Tag Team Championship.	

== See also ==
- UWA World Tag Team Championship
- WWF Intercontinental Tag Team Championship
- Tohoku Tag Team Championship
- Strongest-K Tag Team Championship
