= Independent World Junior Heavyweight Championship =

Japanese wrestling championship

- Current belt design

Details
- Promotion: FMW (1993–1999); Battlarts (1999–2001); MPW (2002); K-Dojo (2008–2010; 2011–2017); OPW (2010–2011); DDT (2017–2021); JTO (2021–2023; 2025–present); Dove (2023)
- Date established: October 28, 1993
- Current champion: Momoka Hanazono
- Date won: October 10, 2026

Other name
- FMW Junior Heavyweight Championship
Statistics
- First champion: The Great Sasuke
- Most reigns: Taka Michinoku and Atsushi Maruyama (3 reigns)
- Longest reign: Hikaru Sato (593 days)
- Shortest reign: Yasu Urano (<1 day)
- Oldest champion: Yasu Urano (47 years, 101 days)
- Heaviest champion: Hideki Hosaka (253 lb (115 kg))
- Lightest champion: Momoka Hanazono (110 lb (50 kg))

The Independent World Junior Heavyweight Championship (Japanese: インディペンデントワールド世界ジュニアヘビー級王座, Hepburn: Indipendento Wārudo Sekai Junia Hebī-kyū Ōza) is a professional wrestling championship that is being defended in various independent promotions in Japan. The title was originally created in 1993 by Frontier Martial-Arts Wrestling.

There have been a total of 41 reigns spread over three lineages and shared among 36 different wrestlers. The current champion is Megaton who is in her first reign.

== History ==
The title was created in 1993 by Frontier Martial-Arts Wrestling (FMW) and it stayed with FMW from its inception to mid-1999, when FMW retired it. In 1998, the title was renamed FMW Junior Heavyweight Championship (FMW認定ジュニアヘビー級王座, FMW-nintei Junia Hebī-kyū Ōza) with the launch of the FMW Unified Organization. It was considered a different title with a new lineage.

On May 31, 1999, Kodo Fuyuki became the FMW commissioner and withdrew the recognition of the title following the introduction of the WEW Single Championship which he awarded to himself on September 24. Yuhi Sano was then recognized as the first Independent World Junior Heavyweight Champion, in continuation of his FMW Junior Heavyweight Championship reign, thus starting a third lineage. Since then, the title has been defended in various Japanese promotions including Big Japan Wrestling, DDT Pro-Wrestling, Kaientai Dojo, Union Pro Wrestling, Osaka Pro Wrestling and Michinoku Pro Wrestling.

Despite FMW no longer recognizing the title, the original championship belt—still bearing the 'FMW' name—continues to be used. In May 2010, a new belt was created when Tarzan Goto's Super FMW promotion briefly revived the FMW Independent World Junior Heavyweight Championship to crown its final champion.

== Reigns ==
=== Original Independent World Junior Heavyweight Championship ===
Key
No.	Overall reign number
Reign	Reign number for the specific champion
Days	Number of days held
Defenses	Number of successful defenses

No.	Champion	Championship change			Reign statistics			Notes	Ref.
No.	Champion	Date	Event	Location	Reign	Days	Defenses	Notes	Ref.
1	The Great Sasuke	October 28, 1993	Kankuran!	Tokyo, Japan	1	(Note: The date of at least one of the title changes in this reign is uncertain, which means that the reign lasted between 338 and 368 days.)	5	Defeated Battle Ranger Z to become the inaugural champion.	
—	Vacated	October 1994	—	—	—	—	—	Sasuke vacated the title to concentrate on a death match against Atsushi Onita.	
2	Ricky Fuji	December 20, 1994	FMW vs. W*ING Alliance Full War in Nagoya	Nagoya, Japan	1	48	1	Defeated The Great Sasuke to win the vacant title.	
3	Hideki Hosaka	February 6, 1995	Japan Nationwide Atsushi Onita Memorial Retirement Tour Last Fight – Final Chapter – February Series	Okazaki, Japan	1	52	1		
4	Koji Nakagawa	March 30, 1995	Japan Nationwide Atsushi Onita Memorial Retirement Tour Last Fight – Final Chapter – March Series	Yokohama, Japan	1	(Note: The date of at least one of the title changes in this reign is uncertain, which means that the reign lasted between 1 and 235 days.)	0		
—	Vacated	October 1995	—	—	—	—	—	Vacated due to unknown circumstances.	
5	Koji Nakagawa	November 20, 1995	Scramble Survivor	Fukuoka, Japan	2	167	1	Defeated Ricky Fuji to win the vacant title.	
6	Taka Michinoku	May 5, 1996	FMW 7th Anniversary Show	Kawasaki, Japan	1	420	10		
7	El Satánico	June 29, 1997	CMLL Domingos de Coliseo	Mexico City	1	57	0	This was a best two-out-of-three falls match held at a Consejo Mundial de Lucha Libre house show.	
8	Taka Michinoku	August 25, 1997	Live event	Puebla, Mexico	2	115	1		
—	Vacated	December 18, 1997	—	—	—	—	—	Taka Michinoku vacated the title right after defending against Shoichi Funaki.	

=== FMW Junior Heavyweight Championship ===
Key
No.	Overall reign number
Reign	Reign number for the specific champion
Days	Number of days held
Defenses	Number of successful defenses

No.	Champion	Championship change			Reign statistics			Notes	Ref.
No.	Champion	Date	Event	Location	Reign	Days	Defenses	Notes	Ref.
1	Minoru Tanaka	May 5, 1999	FMW Strongest Tag League	Yokohama, Japan	1	9	0	Defeated Ricky Fuji to win the vacant title.	
2	Yuhi Sano	May 14, 1999	Battlarts Live event	Sapporo, Japan	1	17 (Note: Sano's two separate reigns are generally being counted as one 261 days reign.)	2	FMW no longer recognized the title after May 31, 1999, and continued to be defended in the Battlarts promotion.	
—	Deactivated	May 31, 1999	—	—	—	—	—	Kodo Fuyuki becomes the FMW commissioner and withdraws the recognition of the title.	

=== New Independent World Junior Heavyweight Championship ===
Key
No.	Overall reign number
Reign	Reign number for the specific champion
Days	Number of days held
Defenses	Number of successful defenses
+	Current reign is changing daily

No.	Champion	Championship change			Reign statistics			Notes	Ref.
No.	Champion	Date	Event	Location	Reign	Days	Defenses	Notes	Ref.
Battlarts
1	Yuhi Sano	May 31, 1999	Live event	Sapporo, Japan	1	244	3	Battlarts recognizes Sano's reign as beginning on May 14, 1999, when he won the FMW Junior Heavyweight Championship.	
2	Minoru Tanaka	January 30, 2000	Live event	Tokyo, Japan	1	102	2		
3	Katsumi Usuda	May 11, 2000	Live event	Tokyo, Japan	1	38	0		
4	Naoyuki Taira	June 18, 2000	Live event	Tokyo, Japan	1	161	3		
5	Katsumi Usuda	November 26, 2000	Live event	Tokyo, Japan	2	373	5		
—	Vacated	December 4, 2001	—	—	—	—	—	Vacated after Battlarts became inactive.	
Michinoku Pro Wrestling (MPW)
6	Ikuto Hidaka	February 17, 2002	Live event	Yokohama, Japan	1	87	1	Defeated Kazuya Yuasa in a tournament final to win the vacant title.	
—	Deactivated	May 15, 2002	—	—	—	—	—	Retired due to FMW closing.	
Various indies
7	Kota Ibushi	August 26, 2007	Pro-Wrestling Summit In Ariake	Tokyo, Japan	1	349	7	Defeated Madoka to revive the title.	
Kaientai Dojo (K-Dojo)
8	Madoka	August 9, 2008	Super Big Show Chiba Hakkenden	Chiba, Japan	1	36	0		
9	Makoto Oishi	September 14, 2008	Club-K Super Downtown 2008	Tokyo, Japan	1	374	7		
10	Gentaro	September 23, 2009	Club-K Super Downtown 2009	Chiba, Japan	1	191	6		
11	Marines Mask (II)	April 2, 2010	Club-K Super Evolution 8	Tokyo, Japan	1	160	2		
12	Tigers Mask	September 9, 2010	Club-K Shinkiba #4	Tokyo, Japan	1	17	0		
Osaka Pro Wrestling (OPW)
13	Orochi	September 26, 2010	Osaka Pro Sumire September Series	Osaka, Japan	1	48	1		
14	Tigers Mask	November 13, 2010	Osaka Pro Fuyu Ga Hajimaru Yo Series	Osaka, Japan	2	217	3		
Kaientai Dojo (K-Dojo)
15	Daigoro Kashiwa	June 18, 2011	Club-K Super Take	Tokyo, Japan	1	141	4		
16	Hiroki	November 6, 2011	Club-K Super Joke 2011	Tokyo, Japan	1	447	15		
17	Ricky Fuji	January 26, 2013	Club-K 3000	Chiba, Japan	1	78	1		
18	Hayato Nanjyo	April 14, 2013	CLUB-K SUPER Evolution 11 - K-DOJO 11th Anniversary	Tokyo, Japan	1	27	0		
19	Taka Michinoku	May 11, 2013	Club-K Tour In Osaka	Osaka, Japan	1	483	16	This match was also for Taka Michinoku's UWA World Middleweight Championship.	
20	Teppei	September 6, 2014	Club-K 3000	Chiba, Japan	3	169	2	Formerly held the title under the name Tigers Mask and began working under the name Atsushi Maruyama during this reign.	
21	Hi69	February 22, 2015	Club-K Super In TKP Garden City	Osaka, Japan	2	49	0	Formerly held the title under the name Hiroki.	
22	Isami Kodaka	April 12, 2015	Club-K Super Evolution 13	Tokyo, Japan	1	203	8		
23	Shiori Asahi	November 1, 2015	Club-K Super In Korakuen	Tokyo, Japan	1	503	11		
24	Ken Ohka	March 18, 2017	Club-K Super In Blue Field	Chiba, Japan	1	190	3		
DDT Pro-Wrestling (DDT)
25	Daisuke Sasaki	September 24, 2017	Who's Gonna Top? DDT Dramatic General Election 2017 - Last Request Special!	Tokyo, Japan	1	87	5	This was a three-way match, where Sasaki defended the DDT Extreme Championship and Konosuke Takeshita defended the KO-D Openweight Championship.	
(DDT) DDT Pro-Wrestling: Ganbare☆Pro-Wrestling (GanPro)
26	Ken Ohka	December 20, 2017	Burning'X'mas 2017	Tokyo, Japan	2	129	0		
27	Keisuke Ishii	April 28, 2018	Dreaming I Was Dreaming 2018	Tokyo, Japan	1	253	6		
28	Shuichiro Katsumura	January 6, 2019	Do It On Your Own Hands 2019	Tokyo, Japan	1	265	5		
29	Keisuke Ishii	September 28, 2019	I Do Not Need A Comic Magazine! 2019	Tokyo, Japan	2	302	7		
30	Hagane Shinno	July 26, 2020	Killer Queen 2020	Tokyo, Japan	2	27	0	Formerly held the title under the name Madoka.	
31	Asuka	August 22, 2020	Heaven's Door 2020	Tokyo, Japan	1	126	2		
32	Shota	December 26, 2020	The World 2020	Tokyo, Japan	1	20	2		
Professional Wrestling Just Tap Out (JTO)
33	Arata	January 15, 2021	JTO Hatsu	Tokyo, Japan	1	310	5		
34	Naoki Tanizaki	November 21, 2021	JTO in Osaka	Osaka, Japan	1	454	6		
Dove Pro-Wrestling
35	Oji Shiiba	February 18, 2023	Live event	Kobe, Japan	1	102	1		
36	Yasu Urano	May 31, 2023	Indie Junior Festival: We Are All Alive 2	Tokyo, Japan	1	<1	0		
37	Oji Shiiba	May 31, 2023	Indie Junior Festival: We Are All Alive 2	Tokyo, Japan	2	91	2		
—	Vacated	August 30, 2023	—	—	—	—	—	Oji Shiiba vacated the title when he went into a hiatus in order to treat his injured knee.	
Various indies
38	Hikaru Sato	December 27, 2023	Taka Michinoku Produce Independent Junior Heavyweight Festival One-Day Tournament	Tokyo, Japan	1	593	14	Defeated Kota Sekifuda in the finals of a 56-person tournament to win the vacant title.	
Professional Wrestling Just Tap Out (JTO)
39	Akira Jumonji	August 11, 2025	JTO Special	Yokohama, Japan	1	146	5	This was a three-way match that also involved Carbell Ito.	
40	Kuroshio Tokyo Japan	January 4, 2026	JTO First Show Of The Year	Tokyo, Japan	1	69	0		
Dream Star Fighting Marigold
41	Megaton	March 14, 2026	Marigold Spring Victory Series 2026	Tokyo, Japan	1	210	3		
42	Momoka Hanazono	October 10, 2026	Marigold Battle Heart 2026	Tokyo, Japan	1	27+	0	This was a winner takes all match in which Hanazono's Up Town Championship was also on the line.	

== Combined reigns ==
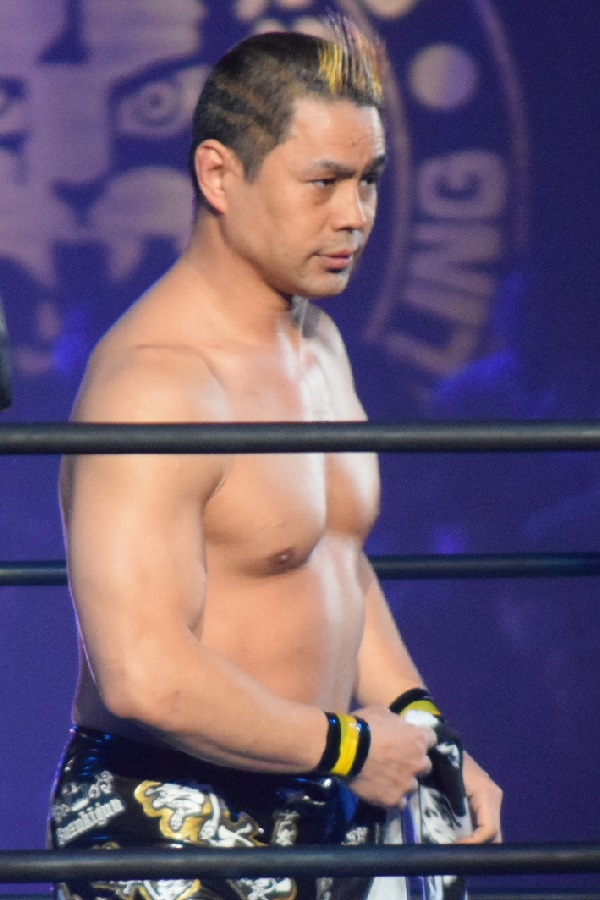
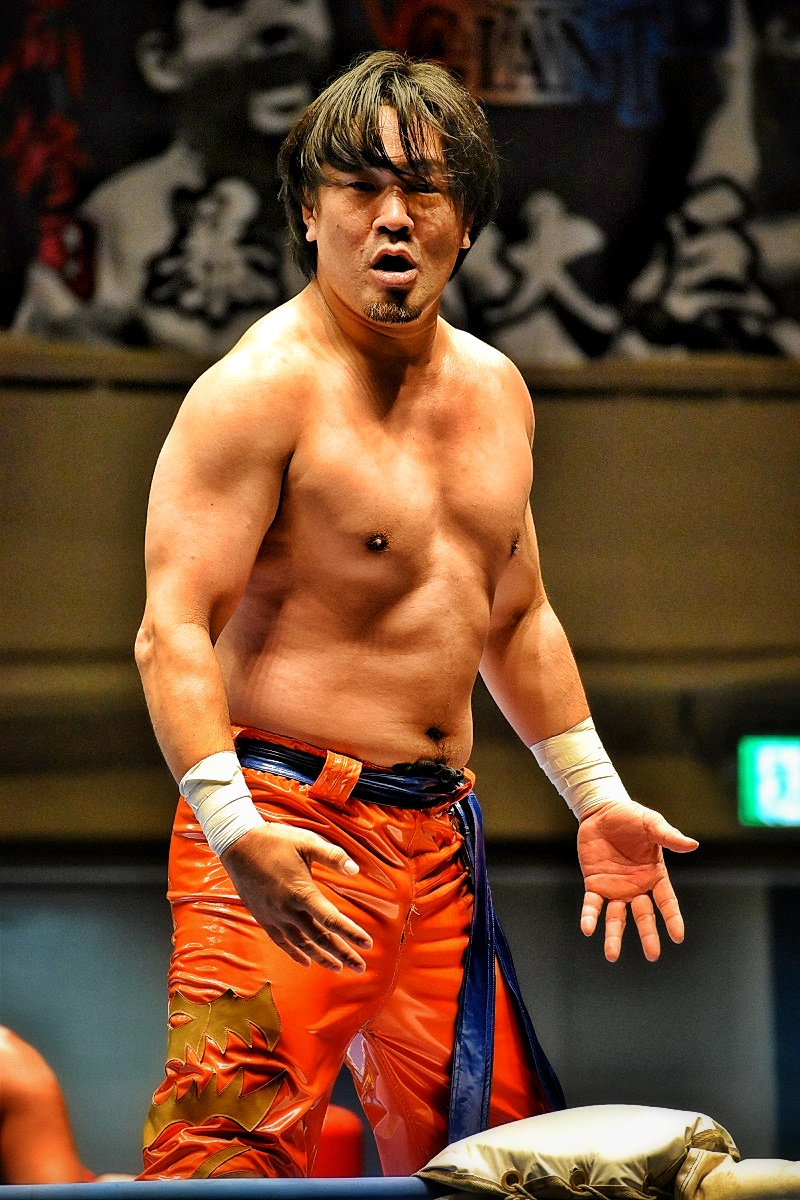
Taka Michinoku (left) and Atsushi Maruyama (right) are both record three-time champions. Michinoku also holds the record for longest combined reign at 1,018 days.

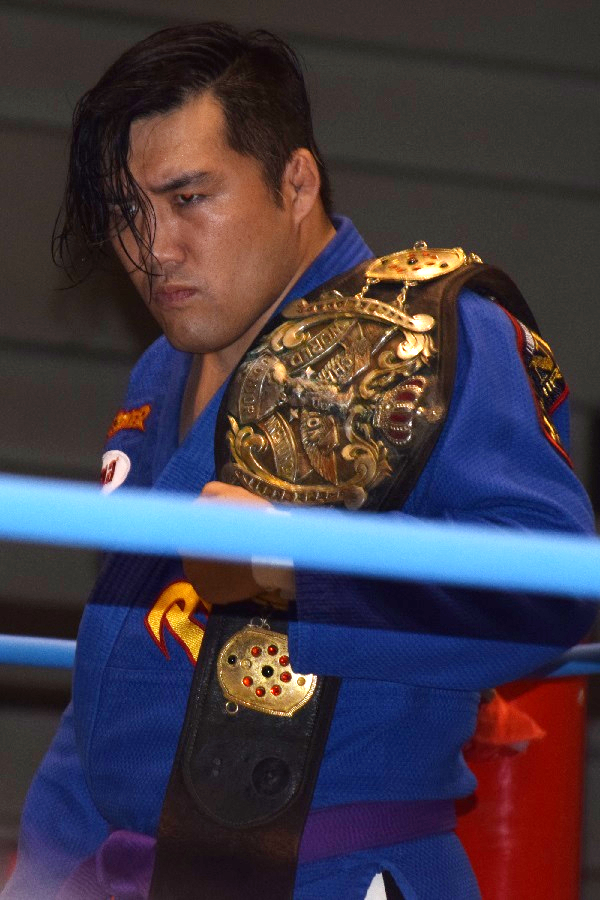
Hikaru Sato holds the record for the longest individual reign at 593 days.

As of 5 November 2026

†	Indicates the current champion
¤	The exact length of at least one title reign is uncertain, so the shortest possible length is used.

Rank	Wrestler	No. of reigns	Combined defenses	Combined days
1	Taka Michinoku	3	27	1,018
2	Hikaru Sato	1	14	593
3	Keisuke Ishii	2	13	555
4	Shiori Asahi	1	11	503
5	Hiroki/Hi69	2	15	496
6	Naoki Tanizaki	1	6	454
7	Katsumi Usuda	2	5	411
8	Tigers Mask/Teppei	3	5	403
9	Makoto Oishi	1	7	374
10	Kota Ibushi	1	7	349
11	The Great Sasuke	1	5	338¤
12	Ken Ohka	2	3	319
13	Arata	1	5	310
14	Shuichiro Katsumura	1	5	265
15	Yuhi Sano	1	5	261
16	Megaton	1	3	210
17	Oji Shiiba	2	3	193
18	Gentaro	1	6	191
19	Koji Nakagawa	2	1	168¤
20	Naoyuki Taira	1	3	161
21	Marines Mask (II)	1	2	160
22	Akira Jumonji	1	5	146
23	Daigoro Kashiwa	1	4	141
24	Ricky Fuji	2	2	126
24	Asuka	1	2	126
26	Minoru Tanaka	2	2	111
27	Ikuto Hidaka	1	1	87
27	Daisuke Sasaki	1	5	87
29	Kuroshio Tokyo Japan	1	0	69
30	Madoka/Hagane Shinno	2	0	63
31	El Satánico	1	0	57
32	Hideki Hosaka	1	1	52
33	Orochi	1	1	48
34	Momoka Hanazono †	1	0	27+
35	Hayato Nanjyo	1	0	27
36	Shota	1	2	20
37	Yasu Urano	1	0	<1

== See also ==
- AWA World Light Heavyweight Championship (predecessor, 1989–1992)
- Dramatic Dream Team
- Professional wrestling in Japan
