= Psycho (wrestler) =

Japanese professional wrestler

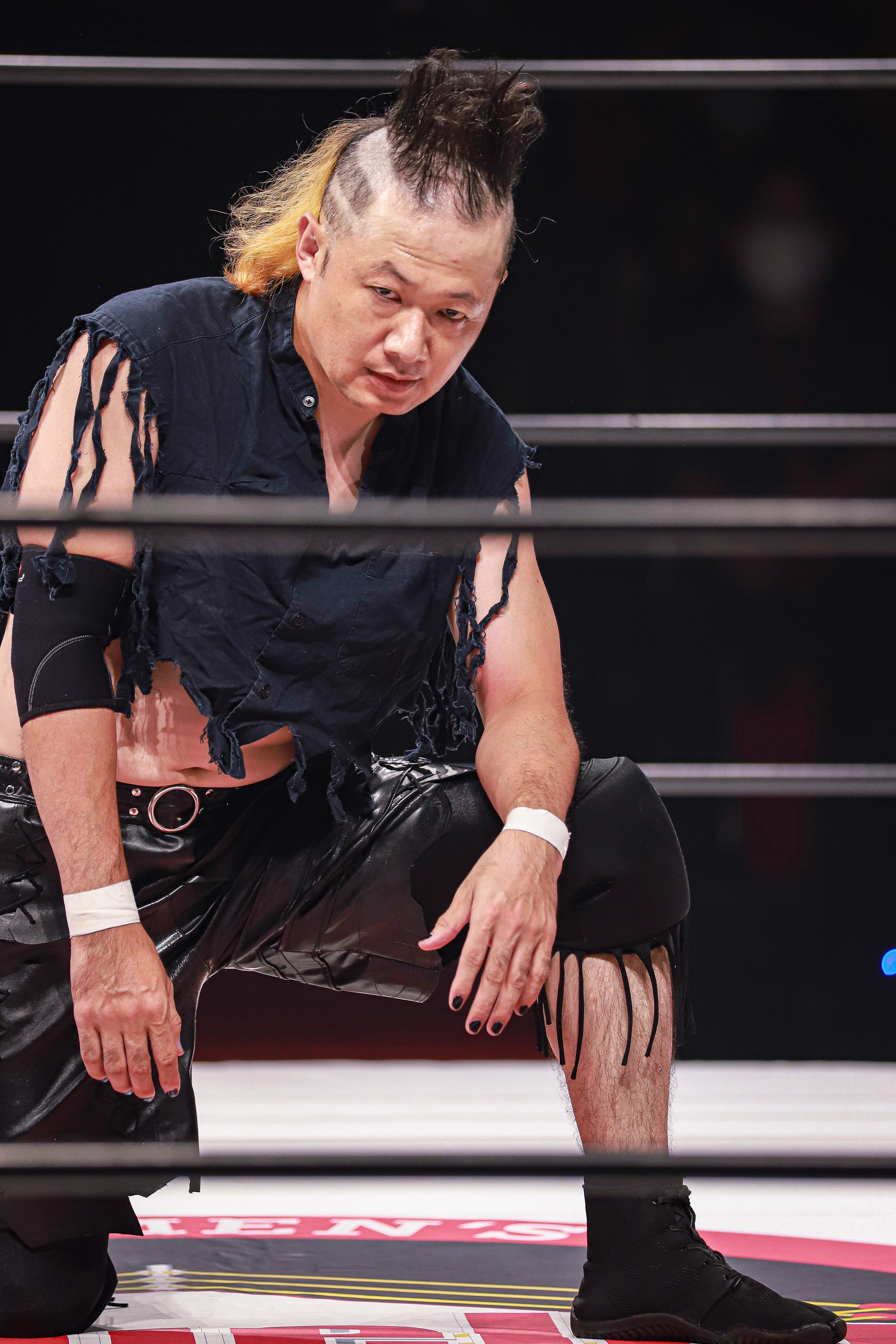

Personal information
- Born: January 5 Chiba, Japan

Professional wrestling career
- Ring names: "Cock Robin" the Psycho; Gabai G-chan; Gabai-jichan; Gabai Ji-chan; Flying Vampire #16; Katō Danzō; Marines Mask (II); Psycho; Sawasdee Kamen
- Billed height: 1.70 m (5 ft 7 in)
- Billed weight: 68 kg (150 lb)
- Trained by: Taka Michinoku
- Debut: December 13, 2001

Psycho is a Japanese professional wrestler. His real name has not been officially documented, a tradition in Mexican lucha libre where masked wrestlers' real names often are not a matter of public record. He made his debut in 2001 and has worked as the second incarnation of Marines Mask (2代目マリーンズマスク, Nidaime Marīnzu Masuku) and as Gabai-jichan (がばいじいちゃん; sometimes transcribed as Gabai Ji-chan or Gabai G-chan), but achieved most success as Psycho (stylized in all capital letters). He has wrestled mainly in Kaientai Dojo and All Japan Pro Wrestling, and currently works as a freelance wrestler.

== Career ==
=== Kaientai Dojo (2001–2012) ===
Psycho debuted in Kaientai Dojo (K-Dojo) in 2002. Initially a tweener, his gimmick was that of a deranged wrestler characterized for wearing trashy clothes, sporting a shabby mohawk haircut and talking in an incomprehensible babble. Receiving a significant push from the start, Psycho formed a steady intergender tag team with Ofune and got into a feud with another female wrestler, Apple Miyuki, whom Psycho continually harassed in multiple ways during their matches. Still, Psycho didn't challenge for a title or a tournament until 2003, when he and Ryota Chikuzen took part in a tournament for the UWA/UWF Intercontinental Tag Team Championship, but being eliminated in the second round by Minoru Fujita and Teppei Ishizaka. From this point onwards, Psycho would challenge for the UWA World Middleweight Championship against Yasu Urano and Super-X, failing at both attempts.

In 2005, Psycho appeared in multiple major promotions as a K-Dojo representative. The first of these was Dragon Gate, where he participated in the Open the Brave Gate Championship tournament, but despite he eliminated Naoki Tanizaki in the first round, he was beaten by Yossino at the second. He next appeared along with trainer Taka Michinoku in Pro Wrestling Noah's Differ Cup 5, losing to Ikuto Hidaka and Minoru Fujita in the first round, and then in Pro Wrestling Zero1, in whose Tenkaichi Tournament he took part as well, scoring wins over Alex Shelley and Osamu Namiguchi. Finally, he worked as well for All Japan Pro Wrestling, teaming up with Michinoku again to compete unsuccessfully in a tournament for the All Asia Tag Team Championship. He remained in AJPW for a time, forming a tag team with comedy wrestler Kikutaro and becoming an unofficial member of Taka's faction RO&D. Psycho's last apparition was an AJPW World Junior Heavyweight Championship shot against Taka, which he lost. Also, Psycho appeared in Hustle as Flying Vampire #16, a minor member of the Takada Monster Army.

Back in Kaientai Dojo, Psycho won finally the UWA World Middleweight Championship from Boso Boy Raito. While reigning as champion, he competed too in the Strongest-K league, beating Makoto Oishi and having a strong match against Kengo Mashimo, as well as the Strongest-K Tag League 2007 with Kunio Toshima, getting little success. He eventually lost his championship in a fatal four way against Boso Boy Raito, Yasu Urano and eventual winner Shiori Asahi. He went unnoticed again for the next years, becoming a member of the low-profiled faction Gekirin and gaining a losing effort to Kota Ibushi for the Independent Junior Heavyweight Championship. Psycho would appear, however, in Chikara's Rey de Voladores 2008 fatal four way, going against Lince Dorado, Helios and TJ Cannon. Also, at the end of the year Psycho and fellow Gekirin member Saburo Inematsu gained briefly the WEW Tag Team Championship. In 2009, Psycho won again the UWA Middleweight title from Quiet Storm, retaining it for months before dropping it to Shinobu.

With the closure of Gekirin, however, Psycho announced he was leaving behind his character. He changed his gimmick and became the second incarnation of Marines Mask, a Chiba Lotte Marines-themed parody of Osaka Pro Wrestling member Tigers Mask. Marines Mask II had his debut on January 11, 2010, teaming up with Kota Ibushi to beat Daigoro Kashiwa and Tigers Mask himself. The character followed with a strong beginning, defeating Gentaro for the Independent Junior Heavyweight Championship and turning into an important babyface of Kaientai Dojo. He lost his championship to Tigers Mask in September, but he and Tigers formed a friendship and teamed up once to challenge for the Strongest-K Tag Team Championship against Kengo Mashimo and Hiroki. In 2011, Marines Mask II appeared in New Japan Pro-Wrestling, losing to Kazuhiro Tamura in the Road To The Super Junior 2 Days Tournament. Marines then became a member of stable Silence, in which he gained a partner named Giant Marines (played by Shuji Ishikawa) and the Chiba Six Man Tag Team Championship with Daigoro Kashiwa and Kaji Tomato. In 2012, Marines Mask II terminated his contract with Kaientai Dojo, appearing onwards as an independent wrestler.

=== Independent circuit (2012–present) ===
In 2012, after recovering his Psycho character for special occasions, Marines Mask II changed to a new gimmick, Gabai-jichan. Under this gimmick, he wore a bearded mask and carried a walking cane, simulating to be an elderly wrestler who fell down with the smallest hit, and relegated himself to comedy matches. Gabai-jichan worked for a wide array of promotions, among them DDT Pro-Wrestling, Osaka Pro Wrestling, Pro Wrestling Zero1, Wrestle-1, Kyushu Pro-Wrestling and Freedoms. In 2015, he wrestled briefly as Marines Mask II for Kaientai Dojo again.

== Championships and accomplishments ==
- Kaientai Dojo
  - Independent Junior Heavyweight Championship (1 time)
  - UWA World Middleweight Championship (2 times)
  - WEW Hardcore Tag Team Championship (1 time) – with Saburo Inematsu
  - Chiba Six Man Tag Team Championship (1 time) – with Daigoro Kashiwa & Kaji Tomato
  - K-Survivor Tournament (2004) – with Saburo Inematsu, Daigoro Kashiwa, Teppei Ishizaka & Yuu Yamagata
  - Hero World Cup (2011)
