= Men's Teioh =

Japanese professional wrestler

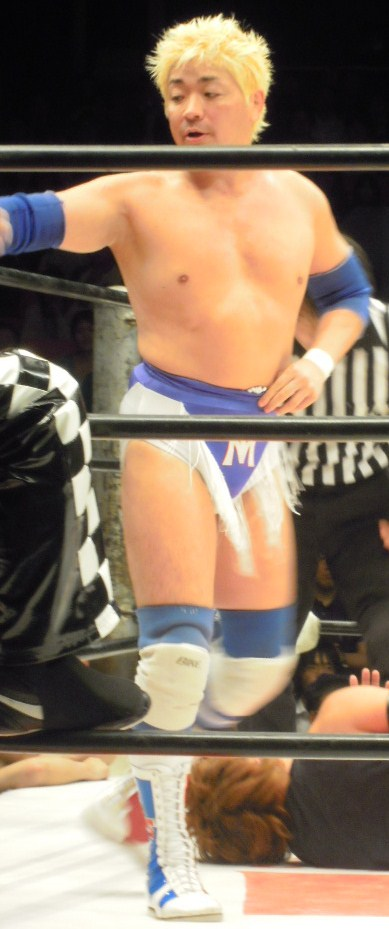
- Men's Teioh in May 2010.

Personal information
- Born: Takeo Ōtsuka 大塚武生; December 16, 1966 (age 59) Shinjuku, Tokyo, Japan

Professional wrestling career
- Ring name(s): Men's Teioh; Terry Boy
- Billed height: 1.65 m (5 ft 5 in)
- Billed weight: 82 kg (181 lb)
- Trained by: Gran Hamada; Super Delfín
- Debut: September 7, 1992

Takeo Ōtsuka (大塚武生, Ōtsuka Takeo) (born December 16, 1966) is a Japanese professional wrestler, better known by his ring name, Men's Teioh (MEN'Sテイオー, Menzu Teiō) (also written MEN's Teioh). Another of his ring names, Terry Boy, is a homage to American professional wrestler Terry Funk.

Men's Teioh is a longtime mainstay of Big Japan Pro Wrestling (BJW) as well as a former competitor of Michinoku Pro Wrestling (Michinoku Pro). He is known as an original member of the group, Kai En Tai, which competed in Extreme Championship Wrestling (ECW) and the World Wrestling Federation (WWF) during the late 1990s. He was also briefly a member of the BWO while in Extreme Championship Wrestling, and appeared on the promotion's first PPV event Barely Legal in 1997.

== Professional wrestling career ==
Ōtsuka was trained to wrestle by Gran Hamada and Super Delfín. He debuted in September 1992 for Federación Universal de Lucha Libre (FULL) under his birth name, adopting the ring name "Men's Teioh" the following month. In March 1993, he began competing for the Iwate-based Michinoku Pro Wrestling promotion.

In February 1997, Kaientai DX travelled to the United States, facing Gran Hamada, Gran Naniwa, and The Great Sasuke at an Extreme Championship Wrestling (ECW) house show. The following month, they appeared on ECW's inaugural pay-per-view, Barely Legal, facing Gran Hamada, The Great Sasuke, and Masato Yakushiji.

In spring 1998, Kaientai returned to the United States to wrestle for the World Wrestling Federation (WWF). They made their in-ring debut on the May 11, 1998 episode of RAW is WAR, with Men's Teioh, Dick Togo and Sho Funaki facing 2 Cold Scorpio and Terry Funk in a handicap match. Kaientai feuded with Taka Michinoku, defeating Michinoku and Bradshaw in another handicap match at Over the Edge 1998, then losing to Michinoku and The Headbangers in a six-man tag team match at King of the Ring 1998. In August 1998, Michinoku joined forces with Kaientai. At SummerSlam 1998, Kaientai lost to The Oddities in another handicap match. Kaientai continued to appear with the WWF until late-1998.

In early 1999, Men's Teioh returned to Japan where he began wrestling for Big Japan Pro Wrestling (BJW). He appeared regularly with the promotion until 2015.

== Championships and accomplishments ==
- Big Japan Pro Wrestling
  - BJW Junior Heavyweight Championship (1 time)
  - BJW Heavyweight Championship (3 times, final)
  - BJW Tag Team Championship (1 time) – with Daisuke Sekimoto
  - Maximum Tag League (2001, 2002) – with Daisuke Sekimoto
  - BJW Six Man Tag Team League 2001 – with Daisuke Sekimoto and Ryuji Ito
- Combat Zone Wrestling
  - CZW World Junior Heavyweight Championship (1 time)
  - CZW World Tag Team Championship (1 time) – with Jun Kasai
- DDT Pro-Wrestling
  - GAY World Anal Championship (1 time)
- Frontier Martial-Arts Wrestling
  - WEW Hardcore Tag Team Championship (1 time) – with Daisuke Sekimoto
- Kaientai Dojo
  - Strongest-K Tag Team Championship (1 time) – with Taka Michinoku
  - UWA World Middleweight Championship (2 times)
- Michinoku Pro Wrestling
  - Futaritabi Tag Team League (1996) – with Dick Togo
  - Futaritabi Tag Team League (2008) – with Shinobu
  - UWF Super Welterweight Championship (1 time)
- Pro Wrestling Illustrated
  - PWI ranked him No. 440 of the 500 best singles wrestlers during the PWI Years in 2003
- Union Pro Wrestling
  - UWA World Tag Team Championship (1 time) – with Hiroshi Fukuda
