= Strongest-K Tag Team Championship =

Professional wrestling tag team championship

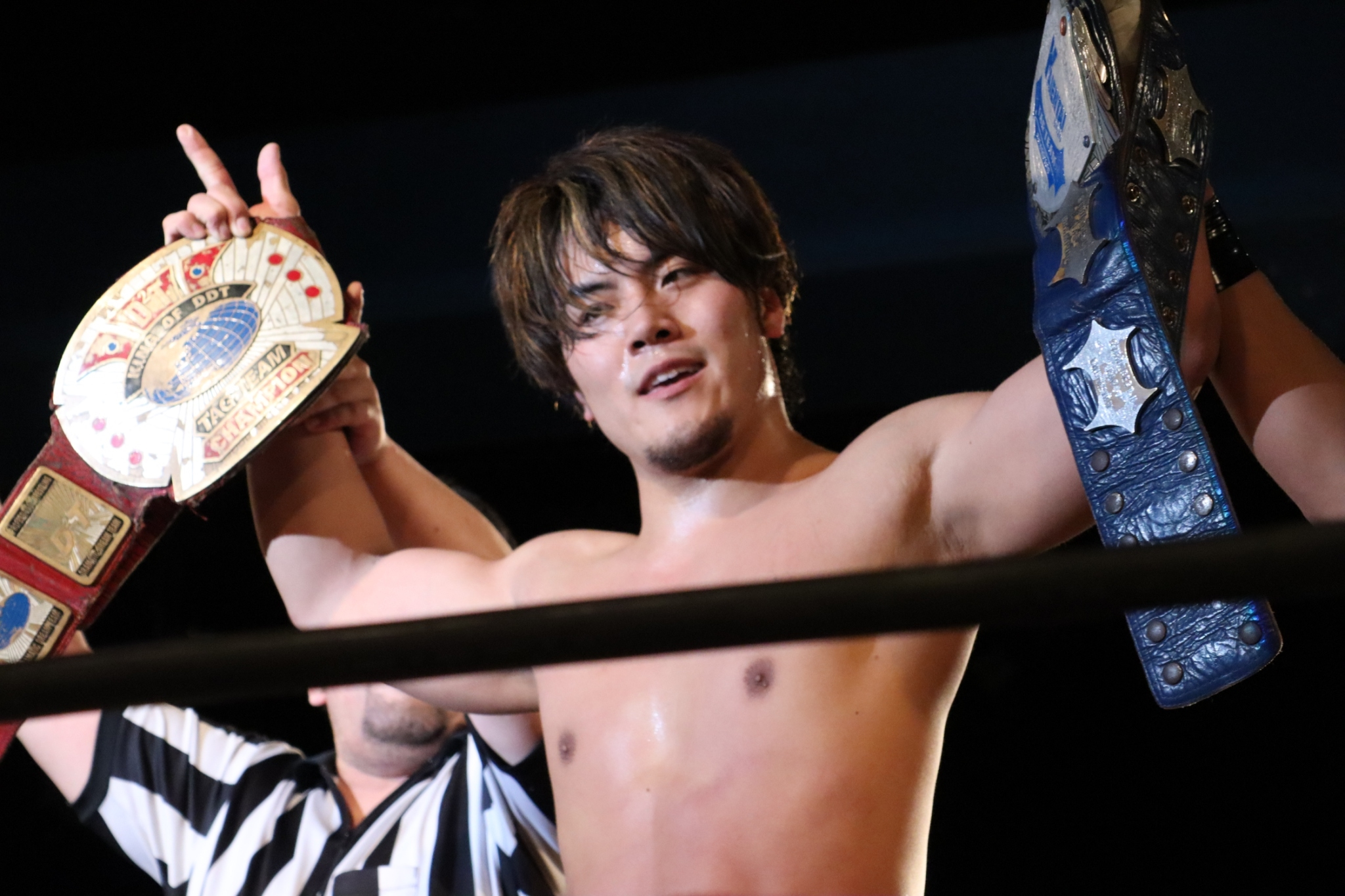
- Mao carrying one of the belts in his right hand

Details
- Promotion: Kaientai Dojo
- Date established: February 27, 2005
- Current champion: Inactive
- Date won: May 26, 2019
Statistics
- First champions: Kazma and Kengo Mashimo
- Most reigns: (as a team); Saburo Inematsu and Yuji Hino) and Kaji Tomato and Taishi Takizawa (3 reigns) (as an individual); Kengo Mashimo (9 reigns)
- Longest reign: Hiroki and Kengo Mashimo (420 days)
- Shortest reign: Kaji Tomato and Taka Michinoku (6 days)

The Strongest-K Tag Team Championship is a tag team championship in the Japanese professional wrestling promotion, Kaientai Dojo. It has existed since 2005, and it is currently inactive.

== Reigns ==
There are a total of 41 reigns and 3 vacancies, shared between 32 different teams consisting of 29 distinctive champions. The last champions were Kaji Tomato and Taishi Takizawa before the titles were deactivated.

== Title history ==
Key
No.	Overall reign number
Reign	Reign number for the specific team—reign numbers for the individuals are in parentheses, if different
Days	Number of days held
<1	Reign lasted less than a day
+	Current reign is changing daily

No.	Champion	Championship change			Reign statistics		Notes	Ref.
No.	Champion	Date	Event	Location	Reign	Days	Notes	Ref.
1	Kazma and Kengo Mashimo	February 27, 2005	K-DOJO Club-K Super Again	Chiba, Japan	1	344	Defeated Taka Michinoku and Ryota Chikuzen in a tournament final to become the first champions. They also defeated Michinoku and Chikuzen on March 6, 2005, to win the UWA/UWF Intercontinental Tag Team Title.	
2	Makoto Oishi and Shiori Asahi	February 6, 2006	K-DOJO Club-K Super Again	Tokyo, Japan	1	58		
3	Handsome Joe and Yasu Urano	April 5, 2006	K-DOJO Club-K Super Ev. 5	Tokyo, Japan	1	277	Handsome Joe is also known as Joe Aoyama.	
4	Saburo Inematsu and Yuji Hino	January 7, 2007	CLUB-K SUPER Kick	Tokyo, Japan	1	119		
5	Miyawaki and Yoshiya	January 7, 2007	K-DOJO K-Special	Chiba, Japan	1	83		
—	Vacated	July 28, 2007	—	—	—	—	Vacated due to Yoshiya suffering legitimare injuries. He gave both titles to Miyawaki, but Kaientai Dojo sanctioned the action as a vacancy.	
6	Kazma (2) and Ryota Chikuzen	September 4, 2007	CLUB-K SUPER TAKA Michinoku 15th Anniversary Performance	Tokyo, Japan	1	33	Defeated Miyawaki and Naoki Tanizaki to win the vacant titles.	
7	Kengo Mashimo (2) and Madoka	October 7, 2007	CLUB-K Super Outbreak In Hakata	Fukuoka, Japan	1	29		
8	Handsome Joe (2) and Taka Michinoku	November 5, 2007	CLUB-K SUPER Joke 2007	Tokyo, Japan	1	228		
9	Omega (Kazma (3) and Miyawaki (2))	June 20, 2008	Club-K Tour in Osaka 2008	Osaka, Japan	1	50		
10	Handsome (Handsome Joe (3) and Taka Michinoku (2))	August 9, 2008	Super Big Show Chiba Hakkenden	Chiba, Japan	2	127	Joe and Michinoku were billed as Handsome beginning with this reign.	
11	Omega (Makoto Oishi and Shiori Asahi)	December 14, 2008	K-DOJO	Fukuoka, Japan	2	374	Oishi and Asahi were billed as Omega beginning with this reign.	
12	Monster Plant (Daigoro Kashiwa and Kengo Mashimo (3))	December 23, 2009	K-DOJO Super overthrow	Chiba, Japan	1	100		
13	Omega (Saburo Inematsu and Yuji Hino)	April 2, 2010	House show	Tokyo, Japan	2	33	Inematsu and Hino were billed as Omega beginning with this reign.	
14	Kaji Tomato and Taishi Takizawa	May 5, 2010	CLUB-K Super Necessary	Chiba, Japan	1	102		
15	Hiroki and Kengo Mashimo (4)	August 15, 2010	Super Big Show Chiba Hakkenden	Chiba, Japan	1	420		
16	Ryuichi Sekine and Saburo Inematsu (3)	October 9, 2011	Club-K Tour In Sapporo	Sapporo, Japan	1	68		
17	Little Galaxy (Hiro Tonai and Yuki Sato)	December 16, 2011	Club-K Super Overthrow	Tokyo, Japan	1	18		
18	Kengo Mashimo (5) and Taka Michinoku (3)	January 3, 2012	K-DOJO K-Special	Chiba, Japan	1	124		
19	Saburo Inematsu (4) and Yuji Hino	May 6, 2012	GWSP7 2012 - Day 7 ~ CLUB-K SUPER BIG SHOW	Chiba, Japan	3	42	Beginning with this reign, Inematsu and Hino were no longer listed as part of the Omega stable.	
20	Little Galaxy (Hiro Tonai (2) and Shiori Asahi (3))	June 17, 2012	KAIENTAI DOJO’s 10th Anniversary in Osaka	Osaka, Japan	1	119		
21	Kengo Mashimo (6) and Ryuichi Sekine (2)	October 14, 2012	TAKA Michinoku 20th Anniversary	Tokyo, Japan	1	189		
—	Vacated	April 21, 2013	—	—	—	—	Vacated due to Mashimo and Sekine breaking up as a tag team.	
22	Daigoro Kashiwa (2) and Ricky Fuji	June 16, 2013	Club-K 3000	Chiba, Japan	1	92	Defeated Hiroki and Yuji Hino to win the vacant titles.	
23	Kazma Sakamoto (4) and Kengo Mashimo (7)	September 16, 2013	Club-K Super In Chiba	Chiba, Japan	1	55		
24	Kaji Tomato (2) and Taka Michinoku (4)	November 10, 2013	Club-K Tour In Osaka	Osaka, Japan	1	6		
25	Hiroshi Fukuda and Shiori Asahi (4)	November 16, 2013	Club-K Super In Blue Field	Osaka, Japan	1	71		
26	Kaji Tomato (3) and Taka Michinoku (5)	January 26, 2014	Club-K Super In Chiba	Chiba, Japan	2	35		
27	Hiroki/Hi69 (2) and Yuji Hino (4)	March 2, 2014	Club-K Super In Chiba	Chiba, Japan	1	287	Hiroki switched to the ring name Hi69 on September 5, 2014.	
28	SFU (Kaji Tomato (4) and Shiori Asahi (5))	December 14, 2014	2014 Club-K Tour In Hakata	Tokyo, Japan	1	210	Kengo Mashimo and Tank Nagai replaced Hi69 and Yuji Hino in this defence.	
29	Men's Teioh and Taka Michinoku (6)	July 12, 2015	Club-K Super In Blue Field	Chiba, Japan	1	56		
30	Magatsuki (Kengo Mashimo (8) and Yuki Sato (2))	September 6, 2015	Club-K Super In TKP	Chiba, Japan	1	224		
31	Sekitoba (Kotaro Yoshino and Taishi Takizawa (2))	April 17, 2016	K-DOJO 14th Anniversary Club-K Super Evolution 14	Tokyo, Japan	1	203		
32	NEX4 (Ayato Yoshida and Kyu Mogami)	November 6, 2016	Club-K Super In Korakuen Hall	Tokyo, Japan	1	112		
33	Magatsuki (Tank Nagai and Yuki Sato (3))	February 26, 2017	Club-K Super In TKP Garden City Chiba	Chiba, Japan	1	56		
34	Kaji Tomato (5) and Taishi Takizawa (3)	April 23, 2017	K-DOJO 15th Anniversary Club-K Super Evolution 15	Tokyo, Japan	2	153		
35	Dino Stones (Dinosaur Takuma and Kotaro Yoshino (2))	September 23, 2017	Tokyo Super Big Show	Kanagawa, Japan	1	50		
36	Magatsuki (Isami Kodaka and Tank Nagai (2))	November 12, 2017	CLUB-K Super In Blue Field	Chiba, Japan	1	161		
37	Magatsuki (Kengo Mashimo (9) and Kunio Toshima)	April 22, 2018	K-DOJO 16th Anniversary Club-K Super Evolution 16	Tokyo, Japan	1	98		
38	Tank Nagai (3) and Ayato Yoshida (2)	July 29, 2018	GRAND SLAM In TKP Garden City Chiba	Chiba, Japan	1	106		
39	Shiori Asahi (6) and Makoto Oishi (3)	November 12, 2018	House show	Fukuoka, Japan	3	54		
40	Moonlight Express (Mao and Mike Bailey)	January 5, 2019	DDT Shimo-Kitazawa Fighting Theater 2019	Tokyo, Japan	1	98	This was a Winner-takes-all match where Mao and Bailey's KO-D Tag Team Championship was also on the line.	
41	Kaji Tomato (6) and Taishi Takizawa (4)	April 13, 2019	K-DOJO 17th Anniversary GRAND SLAM In Korakuen Hall	Tokyo, Japan	3	43		
—	Vacated	June 25, 2019	—	—	—	—	Vacated due to unknown circumstances.	

=== Combined reigns ===
†	Indicates the current champion

Rank	Team	No. of reigns	Combined days
1	Omega (Makoto Oishi and Shiori Asahi)	3	486
2	Hiroki and Kengo Mashimo	1	420
3	Handsome (Handsome Joe and Taka Michinoku)	2	355
4	Kazma and Kengo Mashimo	1	344
5	Kaji Tomato and Taishi Takizawa	3	298
6	Hiroki/Hi69 and Yuji Hino	1	287
7	Handsome Joe and Yasu Urano	1	277
8	Magatsuki (Kengo Mashimo and Yuki Sato)	1	224
9	SFU (Kaji Tomato and Shiori Asahi)	1	210
10	Sekitoba (Kotaro Yoshino and Taishi Takizawa)	1	203
11	Omega (Saburo Inematsu and Yuji Hino)	3	194
12	Kengo Mashimo and Ryuichi Sekine	1	189
13	Magatsuki (Isami Kodaka and Tank Nagai)	1	161
14	Kengo Mashimo and Taka Michinoku	1	124
15	Little Galaxy; Hiro Tonai and Shiori Asahi	1	119
16	NEX4 (Ayato Yoshida and Kyu Mogami)	1	112
17	Tank Nagai and Ayato Yoshida	1	106
18	Monster Plant (Daigoro Kashiwa and Kengo Mashimo)	1	100
19	Magatsuki (Kengo Mashimo and Kunio Toshima)	1	98
19	Moonlight Express (Mao and Mike Bailey)	1	98
20	Daigoro Kashiwa and Ricky Fuji	1	92
21	Miyawaki and Yoshiya	1	83
22	Hiroshi Fukuda and Shiori Asahi	1	71
23	Ryuichi Sekine and Saburo Inematsu	1	68
24	Magatsuki (Tank Nagai and Yuki Sato)	1	56
24	Men's Teioh and Taka Michinoku	1	56
26	Kazma Sakamoto and Kengo Mashimo	1	55
27	Shiori Asahi and Makoto Oishi	1	54
28	Dino Stones (Dinosaur Takuma and Kotaro Yoshino)	1	50
29	Kaji Tomato and Taka Michinoku	2	41
30	Kazma and Ryota Chikuzen	1	33
31	Kengo Mashimo and Madoka	1	29
32	Little Galaxy (Hiro Tonai and Yuki Sato)	1	18

=== By wrestler ===
Rank	Wrestler	No. of reigns	Combined days
1	Kengo Mashimo	9	1,583
2	Shiori Asahi	6	886
3	Hiroki/Hi69	2	707
4	Handsome Joe	3	632
5	Taka Michinoku	6	576
6	Kaji Tomato	6	549
7	Taishi Takizawa	4	501
8	Makoto Oishi	3	486
9	Kazma/Kazma Sakamoto	4	482
10	Yuji Hino	4	481
11	Tank Nagai	3	323
12	Yasu Urano	1	277
13	Saburo Inematsu	4	262
14	Ryuichi Sekine	2	257
15	Kotaro Yoshino	2	253
16	Yuki Sato	2	242
17	Ayato Yoshida	2	218
18	Daigoro Kashiwa	2	192
19	Hiro Tonai	2	137
20	Miyawaki	2	133
21	Kyu Mogami	1	112
22	Kunio Toshima	1	98
22	Mao	1	98
22	Mike Bailey	1	98
25	Ricky Fuji	1	92
26	Yoshiya	1	83
27	Hiroshi Fukuda	1	71
28	Men's Teioh	1	56
29	Dinosaur Takuma	1	50
30	Ryota Chikuzen	1	33
31	Madoka	1	29
