= Makoto Oishi =

Japanese professional wrestler

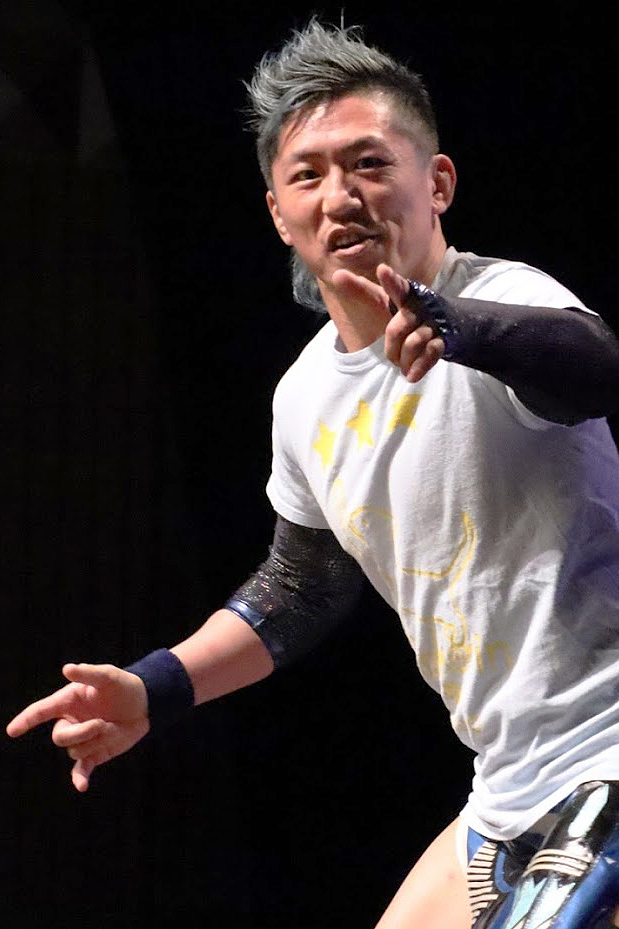
- Oishi in 2020

Personal information
- Born: February 16, 1979 (age 47) Fuji City, Shizuoka, Japan
- Spouse: Misaki Ohata (m. 2019)
- Children: 1

Professional wrestling career
- Ring name(s): Ji Utan; Ken Ohka; Makoto Oishi; Mako Venus; Shigi Taishiji
- Billed height: 1.70 m (5 ft 7 in)
- Billed weight: 70 kg (154 lb)
- Trained by: Taka Michinoku
- Debut: April 4, 2002

Makoto Oishi (大石 真翔, Ōishi Makoto; born February 16, 1979) is a Japanese professional wrestler working for Dramatic Dream Team (DDT). Oishi started his career in Kaientai Dojo, where he became a Strongest-K Tag Team, Independent World Junior Heavyweight and UWA World Middleweight Champion, at one time holding all three titles simultaneously. In 2010, Oishi left Kaientai Dojo to become a freelancer, before making DDT his new home promotion in September 2011.

== Personal life ==
Oishi became engaged to fellow professional wrestler Misaki Ohata on May 27, 2018. He married Ohata in January 2019. Their first child was born on 1 December 2019.

== Championships and accomplishments ==
- Active Advance Pro Wrestling
  - 2AW Tag Team Championship (1 time) – with Shiori Asahi
- DDT Pro-Wrestling
  - DDT Extreme Championship (1 time)
  - Ironman Heavymetalweight Championship (27 times)
  - KO-D 6-Man Tag Team Championship (5 times) – with Danshoku Dino and Kensuke Sasaki (1), Aja Kong and Danshoku Dino (1), Mao and Shunma Katsumata (1), Yuji Hino and Shiori Asahi (1), and Jun Akiyama and Danshoku Dino (1)
  - KO-D 10-Man Tag Team Championship (1 time) – with Ken Ohka, Ladybeard, LiLiCo and Super Sasadango Machine
  - KO-D Tag Team Championship (2 times) – with Kudo and Yuji Hino
  - O-40 Championship (1 time)
  - World Ōmori Championship (1 time)
  - MAGP Award (February 3, 2013)
- Ice Ribbon
  - International Ribbon Tag Team Championship (1 time) – with Choun Shiryu
  - Go! Go! Golden Mixed Tag Tournament (2011) – with Neko Nitta
- Kaientai Dojo
  - Strongest-K Tag Team Championship (3 times) – with Shiori Asahi
  - UWA World Middleweight Championship (4 times)
  - Independent World Junior Heavyweight Championship (1 time)
  - WEW Hardcore Tag Team Championship (2 times) – with Shiori Asahi
  - Best Tag Team Match (2009) with Shiori Asahi vs. Gentaro and Yoshiya on August 9
  - Best Tag Team Match (2011) with Shiori Asahi vs. Prince Devitt and Ryusuke Taguchi on April 17
- Michinoku Pro Wrestling
  - Tohoku Tag Team Championship (1 time) – with Shiori Asahi
- P.P.P. Tokyo
  - Emperor of Party Championship (1 time)
