= Daigoro Kashiwa =

Japanese professional wrestler

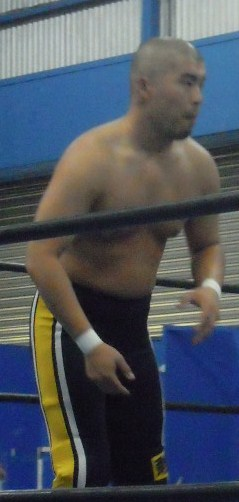
- Kashiwa in June 2012

Personal information
- Born: November 25, 1976 (age 49) Kashiwa, Japan

Professional wrestling career
- Ring name(s): Daigoro Kashiwa; Captain Daigoro; Kashiwa Megane; Kashiwa Mask
- Billed height: 172 cm (5 ft 8 in)
- Billed weight: 90 kg (198 lb)
- Trained by: Taka Michinoku
- Debut: 2001
- Retired: 2018

Daigoro Kashiwa (柏大五郎, Kashiwa Daigorō) is a Japanese retired professional wrestler and referee best known for his time with the Japanese promotion Kaientai Dojo.

== Professional wrestling career ==
=== Independent circuit (2001-2018) ===
Kashiwa made his professional wrestling debut at Osaka Pro Saturday Night Story, an event promoted by Osaka Pro Wrestling on October 6, 2001 where he fell short to Takashi Tachibana.

As part freelancer, Kashiwa marked sporadic appearances for various other promotions. He participated in one of the longest matches in professional wrestling history, an 108-man battle royal at Tenka Sanbun no Kei: New Year's Eve Special, a cross-over event held between Big Japan Pro Wrestling (BJW), DDT and Kaientai Dojo from December 31, 2009, competing against other infamous wrestlers such as Great Kojika, Danshoku Dino, Kenny Omega, Tajiri, Gota Ihashi and many others. On the ninth night of the NOAH Winter Navigation 2016, event promoted by Pro Wrestling Noah on December 23, Kashiwa competed in a 11-man battle royal also involving Akitoshi Saito, Hitoshi Kumano, Muhammad Yone, Yoshinari Ogawa and others. Earlier that night he teamed up with Saburo Inematsu and unsuccessfully challenged Momo No Seishun Tag (Atsushi Kotoge and Daisuke Harada) in a tag team match. At W-1 WRESTLE-1 Tour 2017, an event promoted by Wrestle-1 on December 3, he teamed up with Ryuichi Sekine and went into a time-limit draw against Manabu Soya and Nosawa Rongai.

=== Kaientai Dojo (2002-2018) ===
Kashiwa spent most of his career working for Kaientai Dojo, later Active Advance Pro Wrestling. At BJW/DDT/K-DOJO New Year's Eve Toshikoshi, a cross-over event promoted by Kaientai Dojo in partnership with Big Japan Pro Wrestling and DDT Pro-Wrestling on December 31, 2012, he teamed up with Taka Michinoku and Psycho to defeat Akito, Masa Takanashi and Mikami. Kashiwa had his retirement match at K-DOJO GRAND SLAM In Blue Field on June 17, 2018 where he teamed up with Ayato Yoshida in a losing effort to Kengo Mashimo and Kunio Toshima as a result of a tag team match.

=== New Japan Pro Wrestling (2006-2007) ===
Kashiwa worked in a couple of matches for New Japan Pro Wrestling. At WRESTLE LAND 9th ~ Deadly Target ~, an event promoted on May 1, 2007, he teamed up with Jinsei Shinzaki in a losing effort to Toru Yano and Makai 21. At NJPW Last Of CTU ~ CTU Farewell In Korakuen Hall on August 26, 2007, he teamed up with Apple Miyuki, Hiro Tonai, Taku Anzawa and Teppei Ishizaka in a losing effort to CTU (CTU Ranger Blue, CTU Ranger Green, CTU Ranger Pink, CTU Ranger Red and CTU Ranger Yellow) as a result of a ten-man tag team match.

== Championships and accomplishments ==
- Kaientai Dojo
  - Independent World Junior Heavyweight Championship (1 time)
  - Strongest-K Tag Team Championship (2 times) – with Ricky Fuji
  - Chiba Six Man Tag Team Championship (1 time) – with Tomato Kaji
  - UWA World Middleweight Championship (1 time)
  - UWA/UWF Intercontinental Tag Team Championship (2 times) – with Teppei Ishizaka
