= Shiori Asahi =

Japanese wrestler

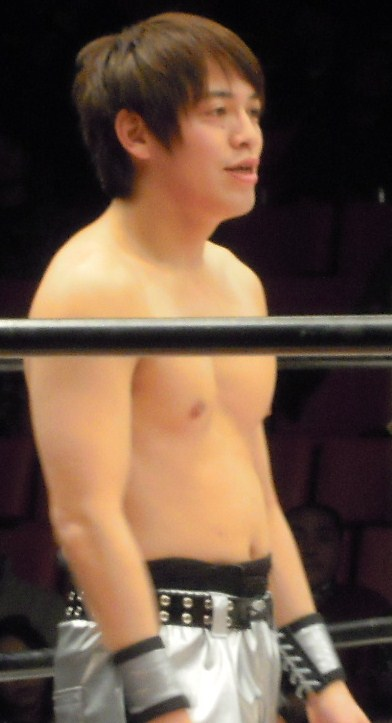
- Shiori Asahi at a Big Japan Pro Wrestling event in January 2011.

Personal information
- Born: February 17, 1978 (age 48) Tsu, Fukuoka, Japan

Professional wrestling career
- Ring name(s): Shiori Asahi; Taka Michinoku; X
- Billed height: 1.75 m (5 ft 9 in)
- Billed weight: 78 kg (172 lb)
- Trained by: Taka Michinoku
- Debut: July 9, 2002

Shiori Asahi (旭 志織, Asahi Shiori; born February 17, 1978) is a Japanese wrestler, currently working for Active Advance Pro Wrestling (2AW). He also appears sporadically for Big Japan Pro Wrestling and 666.

== Championships and accomplishments ==
- Active Advance Pro Wrestling
  - 2AW Tag Team Championship (1 time) – with Makoto Oishi
- DDT Pro-Wrestling
  - DDT Extreme Championship (1 time)
  - KO-D 6-Man Tag Team Championship (1 time) – with Yuji Hino and Makoto Oishi
- Kaientai Dojo
  - Chiba Six Man Tag Team Championship (1 time) – with Hiro Tonai and Yuki Sato
  - Independent World Junior Heavyweight Championship (1 time)
  - Strongest-K Tag Team Championship (6 times) – with Makoto Oishi (3), Hiro Tonai (1), Hiroshi Fukuda (1), and Kaji Tomato (1)
  - UWA World Middleweight Championship (3 times)
  - WEW Hardcore Tag Team Championship (2 times) – with Shiori Asahi
  - Kaientai Dojo Tag League (2010) – with Yuji Hino
  - EX Tournament (2015)
  - K-Survivor Tournament (2014) – with Ayumu Honda, Bambi and Kaji Tomato
  - Best Tag Team Match (2009) with Makoto Oishi vs. Gentaro and Yoshiya on August 9
  - Best Tag Team Match (2011) with Makoto Oishi vs. Prince Devitt and Ryusuke Taguchi on April 17
  - Best Tag Team Match (2012) with Hiro Tonai vs. Kengo Mashimo and Ryuichi Sekine on July 8
  - Best Tag Team Match (2014) with Kaji Tomato vs. Hi69 and Yuji Hino on November 3
- Kyushu Pro-Wrestling
  - Hana Midori 1 Day Tag Team Tournament – with Shinsuke Wakataka (2008) and Mentai☆Kid (2010)
  - Okuchin Cup Tournament (2009)
- Michinoku Pro Wrestling
  - Tohoku Tag Team Championship (1 time) – with Makoto Oishi
