= List of Active Advance Pro Wrestling personnel =

This is a list of professional wrestlers, referees and other personnel who currently and formerly worked in the Japanese professional wrestling promotion Active Advance Pro Wrestling.

== Personnel ==
=== Current wrestlers ===
Ring name	Real name	Notes
Ayame Sasamura	Unknown	
Ayato Yoshida	Unknown	2AW Tag Team Champion
Ayumu Honda	Unknown	
Chicharito Shoki	Unknown	Freelancer; Big Japan Pro Wrestling
Daiju Wakamatsu	Unknown	
Kaji Tomato	Kaji Tomato	
Kengo Mashimo	Kengo Mashimo	Freelancer; All Japan Pro Wrestling
King Takuma	Unknown	
Kotaro Yoshino	Unknown	
Kunio Toshima	Kunio Toshima	
Kyu Mogami	Unknown	
Naka Shuma	Unknown	
Makoto Oishi	Makoto Oishi	Freelancer
Miyawaki	Unknown	
Ricky Fuji	Masanori Morimura	Freelancer; Frontier Martial-Arts Wrestling
Shiori Asahi	Shiori Asahi	
Shu Asakawa	Unknown	
Taishi Takizawa	Yuki Takizawa	2AW Openweight Champion
Takuro Niki	Takuro Niki	
Tatsuya Hanami	Unknown	
Taylor Adams	Unknown	
Yoshihiro Horaguchi	Yoshihiro Horaguchi	

=== Corporate staff ===
Name	Role
Mike Sato	Commissioner
Akimune	Referee
Tommy Ibaraki	Referee
Tomomi Kikuchi	Referee

== Alumni/notable guests ==
=== Male wrestlers ===
- Astroman
- Carolina Akiko (Ring Announcer/Presenter)
- Daigoro Kashiwa
- Daiki Shimomura
- DJ Nira/BAKA Michinoku
- Drew Parker
- Hayato Tamura
- HUB
- Hi69
- Hiro Tonai
- Hajime Ishikawa
- Kazumi Kikuta
- Kim Nam-Seok
- Kota Sekifuda
- Madoka/Super-X
- Makoto Oishi
- Mikata Fuyuki (Ring Announcer)
- Mike Lee Jr.
- Minoru Fujita
- Nobutaka Moribe
- Ofune
- Owen Phoenix
- PABLO
- Marines Mask II
- Randy Takuya
- Ryota Chikuzen
- Ryota Nakatsu
- Ryuichi Sekine
- 'Sheik' Behnam Ali
- Saburo Inematsu
- Shota
- Takashi Sasaki
- Taku Anzawa
- Tank Nagai
- Teppei Ishizaka
- Tomomitsu Matsunaga
- Yasu Urano
- Silver Wolf
- Yoshiaki Yago
- YOSHIYA
- Yuki Ishikawa
- Yuji Hino
- Yusaku Obata

=== Joshi talent ===
- Alex Lee
- Apple Miyuki
- Bambi
- Banny Oikawa
- Mika Iwata
- Miku Aono
- Rina Shingaki
- Tae Honma
- Tomoka Nakagawa
- Totoro Satsuki
- Tsukushi
- Yuki Mashiro
- Yuu Yamagata

== See also ==
- List of professional wrestlers
- Professional wrestling in Japan
