= Naka Shuma =

Japanese professional wrestler

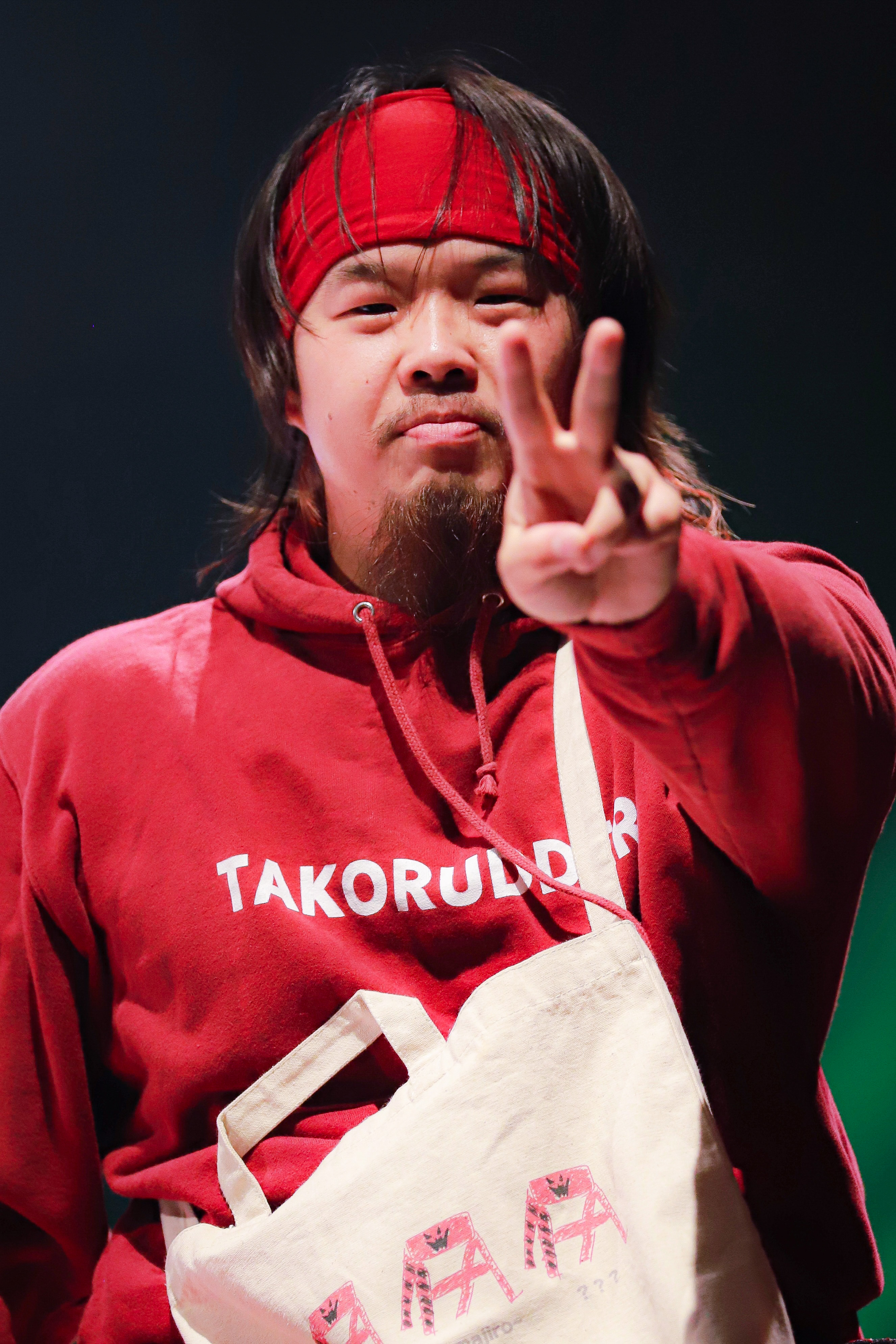
- Shuma in June 2023

Personal information
- Born: 19 December 1998 (age 27) Kishiwada, Japan

Professional wrestling career
- Ring name: Naka Shuma
- Billed height: 167 cm (5 ft 6 in)
- Billed weight: 91 kg (201 lb)
- Debut: 2019

Naka Shuma (ナカ・シュウマ, Naka Shūma) is a Japanese professional wrestler signed to Active Advance Pro Wrestling (2AW) where he is the former one-time 2AW Openweight Champion. He is also known for competing in Pro Wrestling Zero1 and Big Japan Pro Wrestling (BJW).

== Professional wrestling career ==
=== Active Advance Pro Wrestling (2019–present) ===
Shuma made his professional wrestling debut in Active Advance Pro Wrestling at 2AW GRAND SLAM In TKP Garden City Chiba on November 10, 2019, where he fell short to Daiju Wakamatsu in singles competition. At 2AW Tank Nagai Kanzen Nensho on February 11, 2022, he competed in Tank Nagai's retirement gauntlet match, bout which also involved various other notable opponents such as Akira Hyodo, Hideyoshi Kamitani, Shiori Asahi, Ricky Fuji, Tomato Kaji and others.

During his time in the promotion, he chased for various accomplishments and was part of two major units, "The Rule" and "MJ2". At 2AW Grand Slam In Korakuen Hall on December 3, 2023, he teamed up with "MJ2" stablemate Kengo Mashimo to defeat Bug's Mutation (Ayumu Honda and Chango) for the 2AW Tag Team Championship.

==== Pro Wrestling Zero1 (2020–present) ====
Shuma often competes in Pro Wrestling Zero1 as developmental talent sent by 2AW. He made his first appearance in the promotion at BJW/ZERO1/2AW 3 Groups Joint Performance, a cross-over event held on August 11, 2020, where he teamed up with Chicharito Shoki, Daiju Wakamatsu and Takumi Baba to defeat Kosuke Sato, Masaki Morihiro, Takuho Kato and Yuki Ishikawa in eight-man tag team competition. At 2AW Grand Slam In Korakuen Hall on March 20, 2024, he teamed up with Kengo Mashimo to win the NWA Intercontinental Tag Team Championship by defeating Junya Matsunaga and Tsugutaka Sato in a winner-takes-all match which was also disputed for Naka and Mashino's 2AW Tag Team titles which they held in tandem.

==== Big Japan Pro Wrestling (2020 present) ====
Another promotion in which Shuma competes as a developmental wrestler is Big Japan Pro Wrestling. at BJW/2AW Big Advance, a cross-over event held with 2AW, he teamed up with "The Rule" stablemates Ayato Yoshida and Takuma Joshiba to unsuccessfully challenge Chicharito Shoki, Yasufumi Nakanoue and Yuji Okabayashi for the Yokohama Shopping Street 6-Man Tag Team Championship.

== Championships and accomplishments ==
- Active Advance Pro Wrestling
  - 2AW Openweight Championship (1 time)
  - 2AW Tag Team Championship (1 time) – with Kengo Mashimo
  - Active Advance Tournament (2025)
- Pro Wrestling Zero1
  - NWA Intercontinental Tag Team Championship (1 time) – with Kengo Mashimo
