= Tatsuya Hanami =

Japanese professional wrestler

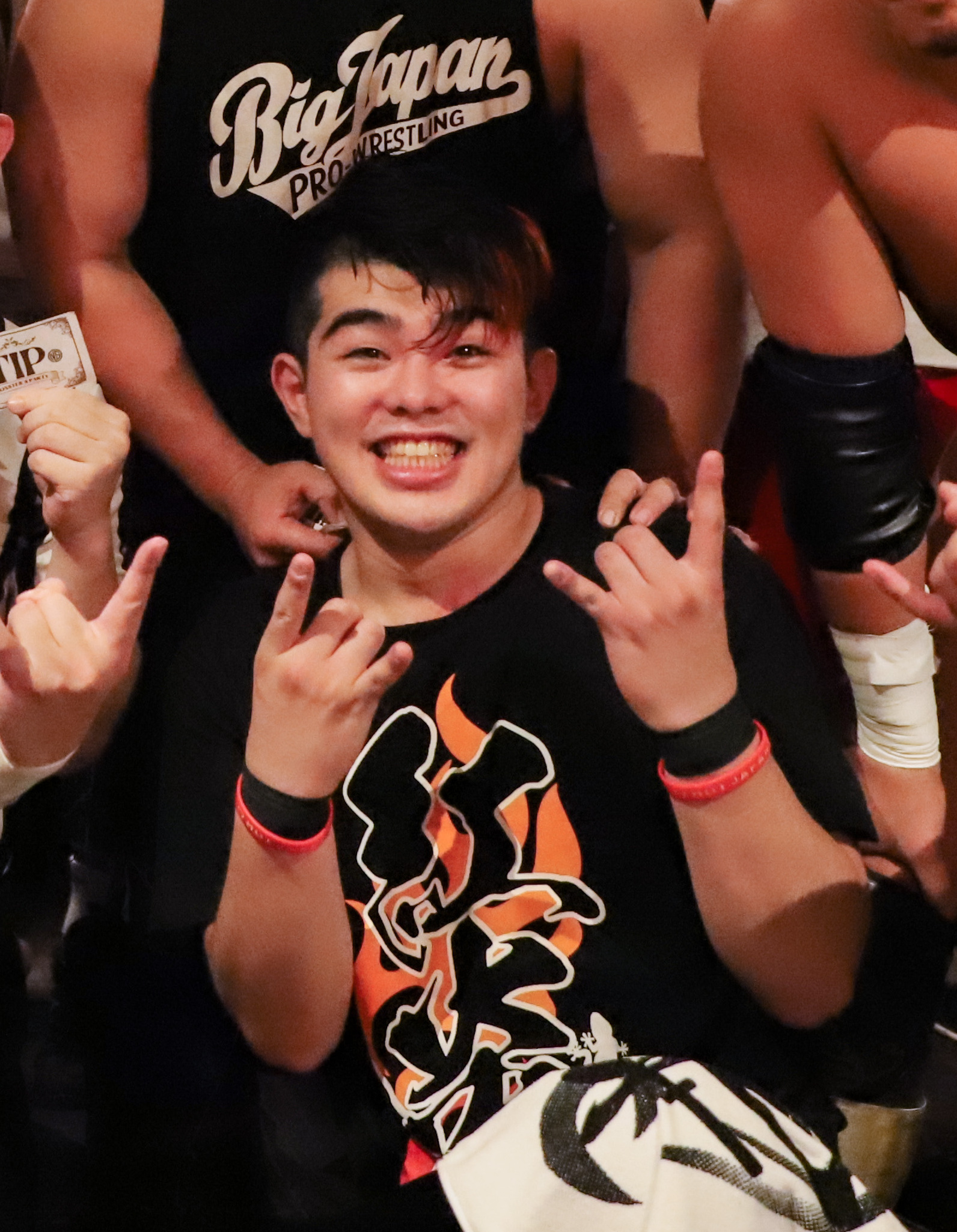
- Hanami in September 2022

Personal information
- Born: 12 November 1996 (age 29) Aizuwakamatsu, Japan

Professional wrestling career
- Ring name: Tatsuya Hanami
- Billed height: 170 cm (5 ft 7 in)
- Billed weight: 85 kg (187 lb)
- Debut: 2018

Tatsuya Hanami (花見達也, Hanami Tatsuya) is a Japanese professional wrestler. He is signed to Active Advance Pro Wrestling (2AW), where he is a former five-time 2AW Tag Team Champion. He is also currently for freelance work with various promotions from the Japanese independent scene such as Big Japan Pro Wrestling (BJW) and Tenryu Project.

== Professional wrestling career ==
=== Active Advance Pro Wrestling (2018–present) ===
Hanami made his professional wrestling debut in the Kaientai Dojo era of 2AW at K-DOJO 16th Anniversary Club-K Super Evolution 16 on April 22, 2018, where he teamed up with Daigoro Kashiwa in a losing effort against Ayumu Honda and Kyu Mogami.

During his time with the promotion, Hanami chased for various championships and was part of the "Koen" stable. He is a former four-time 2AW Tag Team Champion, title which he won on his first occasion alongside Kengo Mashimo at 2AW GRAND SLAM In Korakuen Hall on August 2, 2020, where they defeated Tempest (Ayumu Honda and Taishi Takizawa) to win the titles. At 2AW Grand Slam In 2AW Square on July 20, 2025, he unsuccessfully challenged Daiju Wakamatsu for the 2AW Openweight Championship.

Hanami took part into Tank Nagai's retirement match, a guantlet bout which occurred at 2AW Tank Nagai Kanzen Nensho on February 11, 2022, in which the latter went off against notable opponents such as Shu Asakawa, Tsukushi, Kaji Tomato, Akira Hyodo, Ricky Fuji and others.

=== Japanese independent circuit (2018–present) ===
Hanami competed in various promotions from the Japanese independent circuit as a developmental talent sent by 2AW. At a house show promoted by Big Japan Pro Wrestling on July 22, 2021, he teamed up with Hideyoshi Kamitani and Yuya Aoki to unsuccessfully challenge Chicharito Shoki, Yasufumi Nakanoue and Yuji Okabayashi for the vacant Yokohama Shopping Street 6-Man Tag Team Championship. At FREEDOMS/2AW VersuS, an event promoted by Pro Wrestling Freedoms on April 3, 2022, Hanami teamed up with Kengo Mashimo to unsuccessfully challenge Soul Meat (Tomoya Hirata and Toru Sugiura) for the King of Freedom World Tag Team Championship. He made his first appearance in Pro Wrestling Zero1's Fire Festival at the 2024 edition of the event where he placed himself in the B block, scoring a total of ten points after going against Ryuya Takekura, Koji Doi, Yuko Miyamoto, Chris Vice and Blaze Tannai.

Hanami took part in the 2022 Glocal Tag Tournament where he teamed up with Kengo Mashimo, falling short to Mentai☆Kid and Kodai Nozaki in the first rounds.

=== Westside Xtreme Wrestling (2024) ===
Between February and March 2024, Hanami took an excursion to Germany as he competed in several matches for Westside Xtreme Wrestling. He made his debut at wXw Dead End 2024 on February 9, where he teamed up with Yoichi to defeat Elijah Blum and Nick Schreier in tag team competition. At wXw We Love Wrestling #56 on February 10, he unsuccessfully challenged The Rotation for the wXw Shotgun Championship. Hanami also worked in the "wXw Academy" branch of events. At wXw Wrestling Academy Wrestling Im Hagenbusch on February 21, 2024, he defeated Danny Fray to win the wXw Academy Championship. He dropped the title three weeks later at wXw We Love Wrestling #58 on March 10 to Marc Empire in a four-way match also involving Axel Fox and Danny Fray.

== Championships and accomplishments ==
- Active Advance Pro Wrestling
  - 2AW Tag Team Championship (5 times) – with Kengo Mashimo (2), Takuro Niki (2) and Yuya Aoki (1)
  - Chiba Six Man Tag Team Championship (1 time) – with Ayato Yoshida and Tank Nagai
- Westside Xtreme Wrestling
  - wXw Academy Championship (1 time)
