= Shu Asakawa =

Japanese professional wrestler

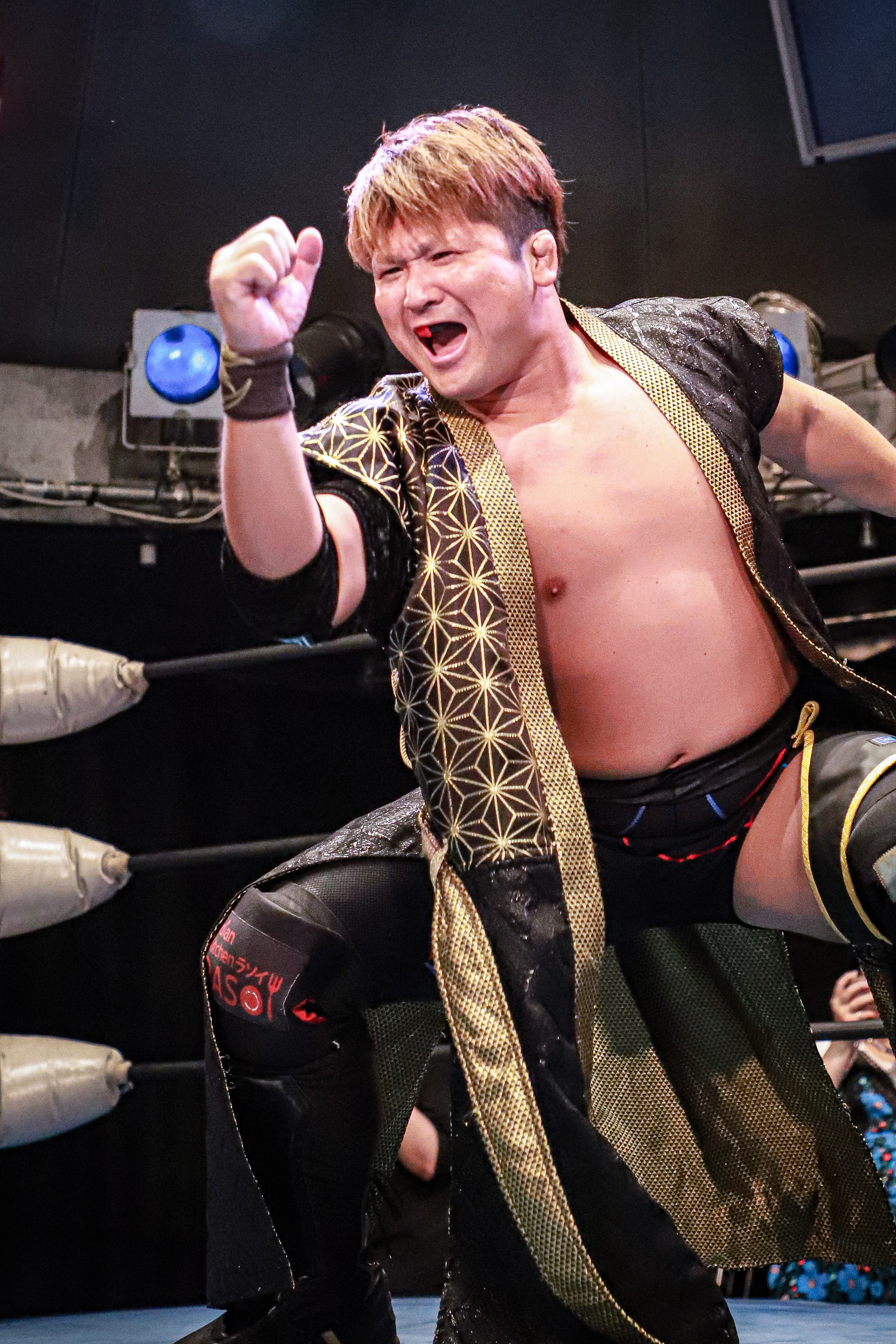
- Asakawa in July 2023

Personal information
- Born: August 30, 1989 (age 37) Osaka, Japan

Professional wrestling career
- Ring name(s): Go Asakawa; Shu Asakawa
- Billed height: 173 cm (5 ft 8 in)
- Billed weight: 85 kg (187 lb)
- Trained by: Taka Michinoku; Taishi Takizawa; Hiro Tonai; Kotaro Yoshino; Ayumu Honda
- Debut: 2015

Taisuke Asakawa better known by his ring name Shu Asakawa (浅川 紫悠, Asakawa Shū) is a Japanese professional wrestler currently performing in the Japanese promotion Active Advance Pro Wrestling where he is a former 2AW Openweight Champion.

== Professional wrestling career ==
=== Independent circuit (2016–present) ===
Due to partially being a freelancer, Asakawa is known for competing in various promotions of the Japanese independent scene. On the first night of Wrestle-1's W-1 WRESTLE-1 Tour 2017 from February 11, Asakawa teamed up with Manabu Soya to defeat Kaz Hayashi and Sho Shindo. At AJPW Chiba Extra Dream 14, an event promoted by All Japan Pro Wrestling on February 12, 2017, he teamed up with Tomato Kaji to defeat Yohei Nakajima and Yusuke Okada. He participated in Pro Wrestling Zero1's 2022 edition of the Fire Festival, placing himself in the Block A where he scored a total of thirteen points after competing against Daisuke Sekimoto, Chris Vice, Takuya Sugawara, Tsugutaka Sato and Junya Matsunaga.

=== Kaientai Dojo/Active Advance Pro Wrestling (2015–present) ===
Asakawa made his professional wrestling debut in Kaientai Dojo on September 6, 2015, at K-DOJO Club-K Super In TKP, where he picked up a victory over Kyu Mogami in singles competition. During his time in the promotion, he chased for various championships promoted by it. Asakawa is a former 2AW Openweight Champion, title which he won under the 2AW brand at 2AW GRAND SLAM In Korakuen Hall on September 1, 2019, in a tournament final after defeating Ayato Yoshida to become the inaugural champion. He is a former Strongest-K Champion, title which he won under the Kainetai Dojo brand. At K-DOJO Club-K Tour In Osaka on March 25, 2017, he teamed up with his "Nex4" stablemate to unsuccessfully challenge Magatsuki (Tank Nagai and Yuki Sato) for the Strongest-K Tag Team Championship. He took part in various match gimmicks, such as a battle royal from 2AW Beginning Of The New Year on January 2, 2022, won by Ayumu Honda and also involving various of the time's roster members such as Ayame Sasamura, Hiroshi Yamato, Kengo Mashimo, Tatsuya Hanami, The Andrew King Takuma and many others.

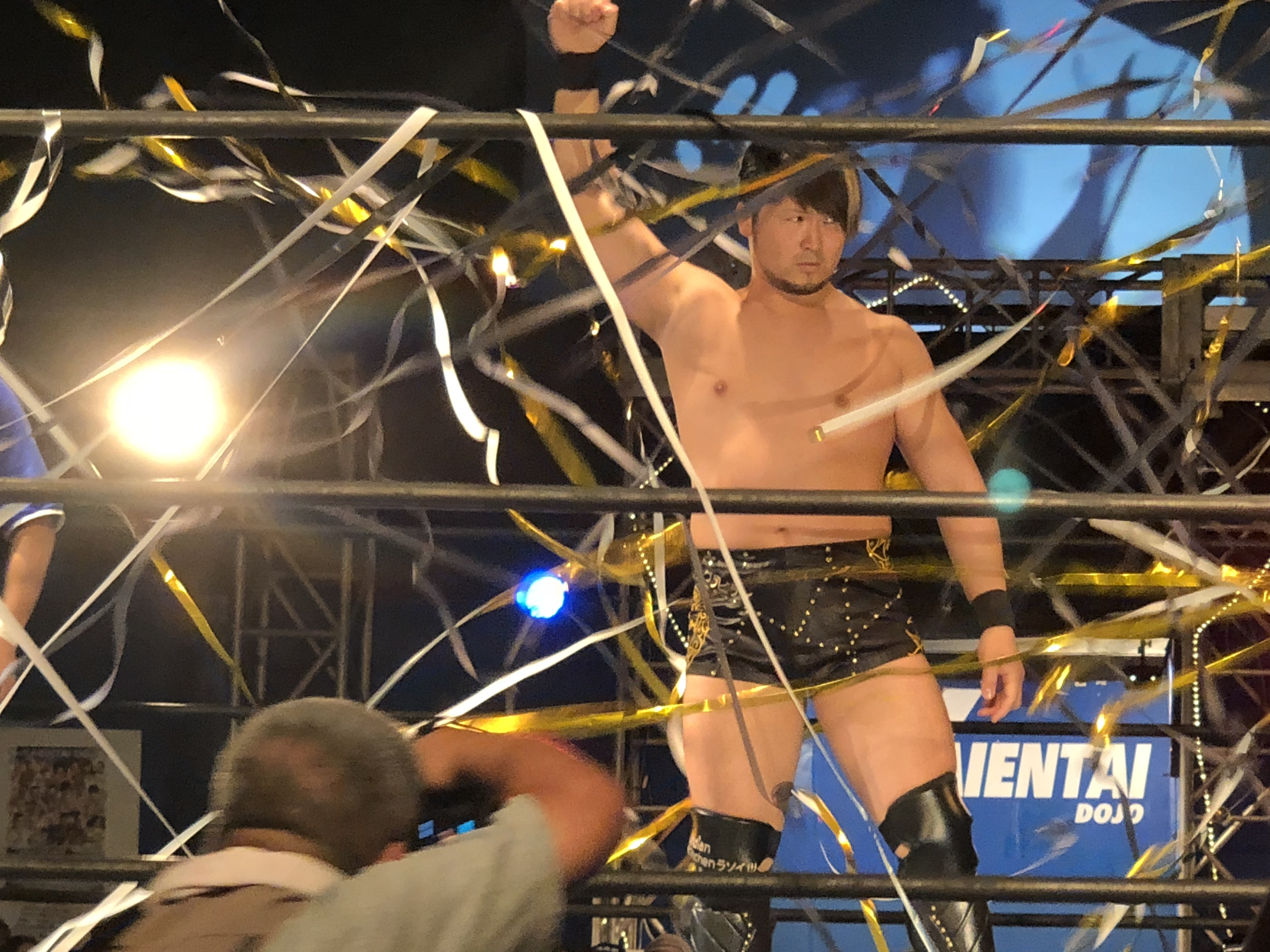
Asakawa in June 2018

He participated in various of the promotion's signature events such as the K-Metal League, making his first appearance at the 2016 edition where he scored a total of four points after going against Ayato Yoshida, Takuya Nomura, Kyu Mogami and Rekka. He scored his best result at the 2017 edition which he won by defeating Yoshihiro Horaguchi in the first rounds, Shiori Asahi in the second rounds, Taka Michinoku in the semifinals and Kotaro Yoshino in the finals. Another tournament in which he competed was the BO-SO Golden Tag League, in which he made his first appearance at the 2017 edition where he teamed up with Dinosaur Takuma and scored a total of four points after competing against the teams of Magatsuki (Ayumu Honda and Kengo Mashimo), Shinichiro Tominaga and Shiori Asahi, and Sekitoba (Kotaro Yoshino and Taishi Takizawa).

=== Big Japan Pro Wrestling (2016–present) ===
Asakawa has shared a long-time tenure with Big Japan Pro Wrestling due to the latter promotion's partnership with Kaientai Dojo. He made his debut in the promotion at BJW D-Rize on March 16, 2016, where he teamed up with Atsushi Maruyama in a losing effort against Ayato Yoshida and Hideyoshi Kamitani.

=== New Japan Pro Wrestling (2016–2018) ===
Asakawa took part in New Japan Pro Wrestling's developmental branch of Lion's Gate Project, making his debut at the third show from September 1, 2016, where he fell short to David Finlay. He scored his second appearance at Project 7 on July 4, 2017, where he fell short to Yuji Nagata. At Project 8 on October 12, 2017, he teamed up with Yuma Aoyagi in a losing effort against Tencozy (Hiroyoshi Tenzan and Satoshi Kojima). At Project 9 on November 16, 2017, he fell short to Ryusuke Taguchi. He marked his last appearance for the company at Project 11 on April 10, 2018, where he teamed up with Ayato Yoshida to defeat Yuji Nagata and Shota Umino in a tag team match.

== Championships and accomplishments ==
- Kaientai Dojo/2AW
  - 2AW Openweight Championship (1 time, inaugural)
  - Strongest-K Championship (1 time)
  - Kaioh Tournament (2017)
  - K-Metal League (2017)
- Osaka Pro Wrestling
  - Osaka Tag Team Championship (3 times, current) – with Yasutaka Oosera (1), Goliath (1) and Toru (1)
