= Kyu Mogami =

Japanese professional wrestler

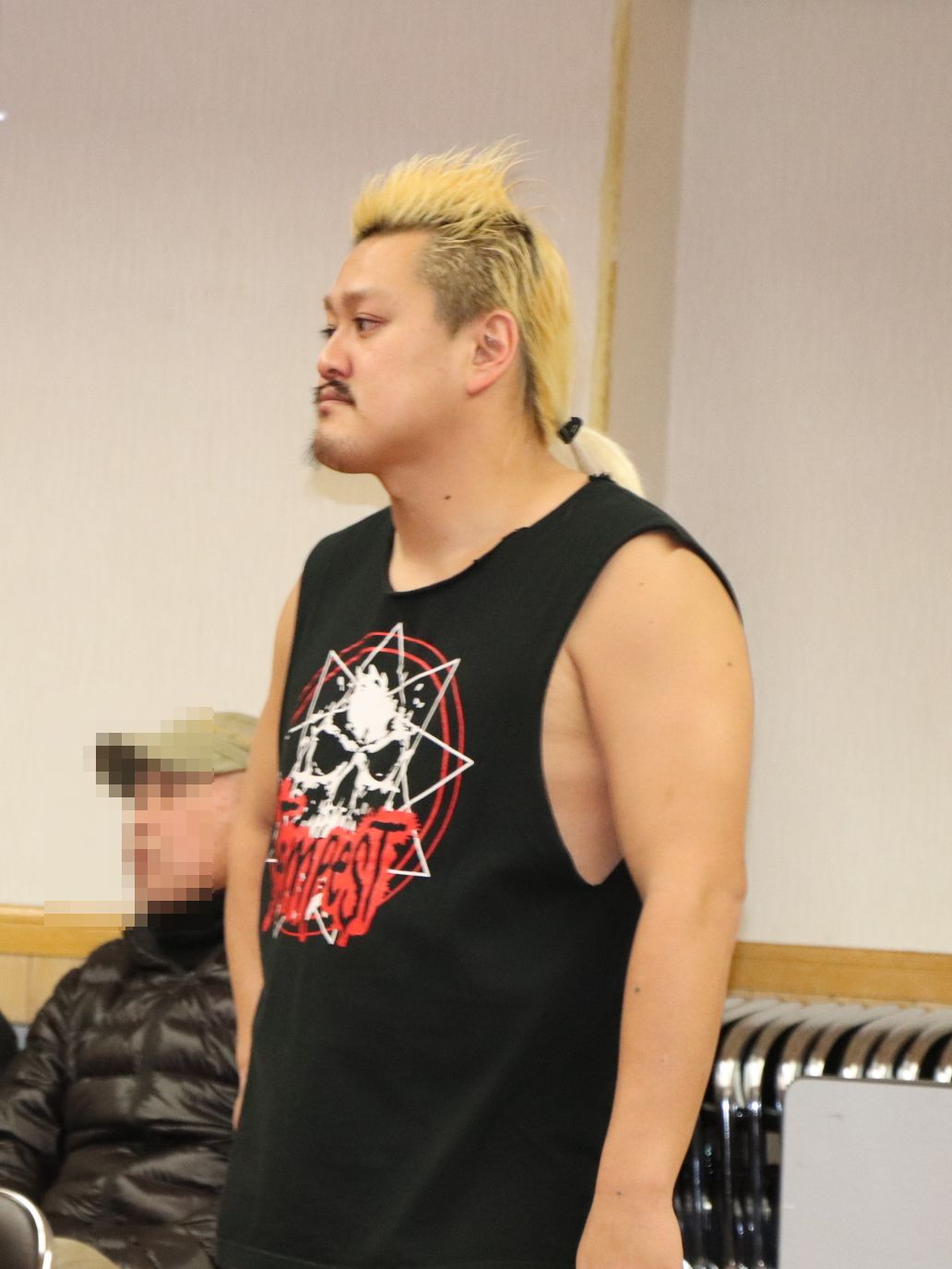
- Mogami in January 2020

Personal information
- Born: 31 May 1992 (age 34) Tozawa, Japan
- Education: Nihon University

Professional wrestling career
- Ring name: Kyu Mogami Span Kingston Joker #2 Gamo
- Billed height: 174 cm (5 ft 9 in)
- Billed weight: 83 kg (183 lb)
- Trained by: Ryuichi Sekine; Kotaro Nasu
- Debut: 2015

Kyu Mogami (最上九, Mogami Kyū) is a Japanese professional wrestler signed to Active Advance Pro Wrestling (2AW). He is also known for his tenures with Big Japan Pro Wrestling (BJW), Pro Wrestling Freedoms and various other promotions from the Japanese independent scene.

== Early life ==
The origin of his ring name comes from the Mogami District of which his hometown of Tozawa is part of. During his junior and high school years, Mogami played baseball but was forced to quit due to elbow injuries. He is a fan of Yokohama DeNA BayStars. During his student years, he was part of the Nihon University pro-wrestling club.

== Professional wrestling career ==
=== Active Advance Pro Wrestling (2015–present) ===
==== Kaientai Dojo era (2015–2019) ====
Mogami made his professional wrestling debut in Kaientai Dojo at K-DOJO Club-K Super In TKP on September 6, 2015, where he fell short to Go Asakawa in singles competition. During the Kaientai Dojo era of the promotion between 2015 and 2019, Mogami was part of the "Magatsuki" and "NEX4" stables.

During his tenure with the promotion he chased for various accomplishments. At K-DOJO Club-K Super In Korakuen Hall on November 6, 2016, he teamed up with "NEX4" stablemate Ayato Yoshida and defeated Sekitoba (Kotaro Yoshino and Taishi Takizawa) to win the Strongest-K Tag Team Championship. This represented Mogami's first championship won in his career.

He competed in various signature events of the promotion. He won the 2017 edition of the BO-SO Golden Tag League where he teamed up with Ayato Yoshida, topping out the competition by defeating the teams of Asuma and Kaji Tomato, Ayumu Honda and Kengo Mashimo, Daigoro Kashiwa and Marines Mask, Dinosaur Takuma and Go Asakawa, Kotaro Yoshino and Taishi Takizawa, Shinichiro Tominaga and Shiori Asahi, and Tank Nagai and Yuki Sato.

Mogami competed in the 2016 Super J-Cup of New Japan Pro Wrestling where he defeated Yuma in the first rounds, then fell short to Shiori Asahi in the second ones.

==== 2AW era (2019–present) ====
During the 2AW era from 2019 to present, he was part of "Starlight Dreamers" and "Tempest".

At a house show from June 20, 2019, Mogami defeated Fuminori Abe to win the UWA World Middleweight Championship. At 2AW ChiBattle 39 on Julu 21, 2019, Mogami competed in the tournament to crown the inaugural 2AW Openweight Champion in which he defeated Ayumu Honda then fell short to Minoru Fujita in the block matches. At 2AW GRAND SLAM In Shinkiba on January 10, 2020, Mogami teamed up with Ayumu Honda and Taishi Takizawa and defeated Ayato Yoshida, Kotaro Yoshino and Tank Nagai to win the Chiba Six Man Tag Team Championship. During their reign, the titles became inactive in late 2020 under unknown circumstances. He competed in the one-day inaugural tournament of the 2AW Tag Team Championship from a house show promoted on February 14, 2020, in which he teamed up with Minoru Fujita and defeated Shu Asakawa and Taishi Takizawa in the semifinals only to fall short to Ayato Yoshida and Tank Nagai in the finals.

=== Big Japan Pro Wrestling (2016–present) ===
Mogami often competes in Big Japan Pro Wrestling as a 2AW talent. He made his debut on the third night of the BJW Spring Of Ueno Pro-Wrestling Festival from March 29, 2016, where he teamed up with Yuji Okabayashi in a losing effort against Ayato Yoshida and Hideyoshi Kamitani.

He competed in the Saikyo Tag League, making his first appearance in the 2018 edition where he teamed up with Masaya Takahashi, placing themselves in the B block of the tournament where they scored a total of six points after going against Ryuji Ito and Ryuichi Sekine, Abdullah Kobayashi and Yoshihisa Uto, Crazy Lovers (Masashi Takeda and Takumi Tsukamoto), Takayuki Ueki and Toshiyuki Sakuda, Yuko Miyamoto and Isami Kodaka, and Minoru Fujita and Kankuro Hoshino.

=== Pro Wrestling Freedoms (2022–present) ===
Another promotion in which Mogami competed is Pro Wrestling Freedoms in which he made his debut at FREEDOMS The Gekokujo 2022 on March 29, where he teamed up with "ERE" stablemates Takayuki Ueki, Toshiyuki Sakuda and Violento Jack in a losing effort against UNCHAIN (Kamui, Kenji Fukimoto, Minoru Fujita and Rina Yamashita). At FREEDOMS Be A Hero 2023 on November 2, Mogami teamed up with Toshiyuki Sakuda and defeated Daisuke Masaoka and Toru Sugiura to win the King of Freedom World Tag Team Championship.

== Championships and accomplishments ==
- Kaientai Dojo/Active Advance Pro Wrestling
  - 2AW Tag Team Championship (1 time) – with Kengo Mashimo
  - Strongest-K Tag Team Championship (1 time) – with Ayato Yoshida
  - Chiba Six Man Tag Team Championship (3 times) – with Ayumu Honda and Yuki Sato (1), Ayumu Honda and Kunio Toshima (1), and Ayumu Honda and Taishi Takizawa (1)
  - UWA World Middleweight Championship (1 time)
  - Ricky Fuji Certified Aggressive World Heavyweight Championship (1 time)
  - BO-SO Golden Tag League (2017) – with Ayato Yoshida
- Pro Wrestling Freedoms
  - King of Freedom World Tag Team Championship (2 times, current) – with Toshiyuki Sakuda (1) and Toru Sugiura (1).
  - Barefoot King Championship (1 time) – with Toshiyuki Sakuda
