= Takuro Niki =

Japanese professional wrestler

Personal information
- Born: 29 October 2000 (age 26) Tsubame, Japan

Professional wrestling career
- Ring name: Takuro Niki
- Billed height: 170 cm (5 ft 7 in)
- Billed weight: 84 kg (185 lb)
- Trained by: Shuji Kondo; Kaz Hayashi
- Debut: 2019

Takuro Niki (仁木琢郎, Niki Takurō) is a Japanese professional wrestler signed to Active Advance Pro Wrestling, where he is a former two-time 2AW Openweight Champion. He is also known for competing in Tenryu Project and Wrestle-1.

== Professional wrestling career ==
=== Wrestle-1 (2019–2020) ===
Niki made his professional wrestling debut in Wrestle-1 at Wrestle Soul, an event promoted on September 28, 2019, where he fell short to one of his coaches, Shuji Kondo, in a dark exhibition match. On April 1, 2020, at W-1 WRESTLE-1 Tour 2020 Trans Magic, Wrestle-1, has held its last event before closure. Niki competed twice. First in a winning effort against Takanori Ito, and secondly, in a battle royal won by Manabu Soya and featuring various other members of the roster such as Cima, El Lindaman, Hiroshi Yamato, Jiro Kuroshio, Ryota Hama, Yasufumi Nakanoue, and many more.

=== Active Advance Pro Wrestling (2020–present) ===
Niki made his debut in Active Advance Pro Wrestling at 2AW Launching Business 1st Anniversary on July 5, 2020, where he defeated Chicharito Shoki in singles competition. Niki won the 2021 edition of the Advance Cup by overcoming Naka Shuma, Genta Hiriki and Chicharito Shoki in the group stage and by defeating Shuma in the finals on May 5, 2021. During his tenure with the promotion, Niki joined the "Koen" stable in 2022. He won his first title, the 2AW Tag Team Championship, at 2AW Grand Slam In Korakuen Hall on September 11, 2022, alongside stablemate Tatsuya Hanami by defeating The Rule (Ayato Yoshida and Excilio). Niki won the 2AW Openweight Championship at 2AW Grand Slam In TKP Garden City Chiba on October 29, 2023, by defeating Kohei Sato.

Niki competed in Pro Wrestling Zero1's Tenkaichi Junior tournament as a developmental talent sent by 2AW. He made his first appearance in the 2022 edition of the tournament in which he placed himself in the A block of the competition where he scored a total of 10 points after going against Tatsuhito Takaiwa, Takumi Baba, Andy Wu and Yasu Kubota, failing to qualify for the finals.

=== Tenryu Project (2021–present) ===
Niki has frequently competed in Tenryu Project since 2021. During his tenure with the promotion, he has won the Tenryu Project International Junior Heavyweight Tag Team Championship alongside Oji Shiiba at Wrestle And Romance Vol. 11 on March 26, 2023, by defeating Kenichiro Arai and Rey Paloma. Niki competed in one of the promotion's signature events, the Ryūkon Cup, in which he made his first appearance in the 2022 edition of the tournament, where he defeated Masayuki Kono in the first round, Mizuki Watase in the second, and then fell short to Keita Yano in the semifinals. At the 2024 edition, he fell to Yusuke Kodama in the second round.

=== New Japan Pro Wrestling (2024) ===
Niki participated in the 2024 edition of New Japan Pro Wrestling's Sakura Genesis from April 6, where he teamed up with Ayato Yoshida and Chicharito Shoki in a losing effort against Chaos (Tomohiro Ishii and Toru Yano) and Oleg Boltin.

== Championships and accomplishments ==
- Active Advance Pro Wrestling
  - 2AW Openweight Championship (2 times)
  - 2AW Tag Team Championship (2 times) – with Tatsuya Hanami
  - Active Advance Tournament (2023)
- Tenryu Project
  - Tenryu Project International Junior Heavyweight Tag Team Championship (2 times) – with Oji Shiiba (1) and Yusuke Kodama (1)
  - Tenryu Project World 6-Man Tag Team Championship (1 time, current) — with Kohei Sato and Satsuki Nagao
