= Strongest-K Championship =

Professional wrestling championship

Details
- Promotion: Kaientai Dojo
- Date established: July 3, 2004
- Date retired: May 26, 2019
Statistics
- First champion: Hi69
- Final champion: Ayato Yoshida
- Most reigns: Kengo Mashimo; 6 reigns
- Longest reign: Kengo Mashimo; 552 days
- Shortest reign: Kaji Tomato; 20 days
- Oldest champion: Miyawaki; 36 years, 63 days
- Youngest champion: Hi69; 22 years, 70 days
- Heaviest champion: Daisuke Sekimoto; 264 lbs (120 kg)
- Lightest champion: Taka Michinoku; 169 lbs (77 kg)

The Strongest-K Championship was the top singles title in Kaientai Dojo and was established in 2004. The holder of the title was referred to as the "Champion of Strongest-K". There have been a total of 27 reigns and one vacancy shared between 16 different champions. The final title holder was Ayato Yoshida.

== Title history ==
=== Reigns ===
Key
No.	Overall reign number
Reign	Reign number for the specific champion
Days	Number of days held
Defenses	Number of successful defenses
<1	Reign lasted less than a day
+	Current reign is changing daily

No.	Champion	Championship change			Reign statistics			Notes	Ref.
No.	Champion	Date	Event	Location	Reign	Days	Defenses	Notes	Ref.
1	Hi69	July 3, 2004	House show	Odaiba, Japan	1	70	1	Hi69 defeated Kengo Mashimo in the finals of a 16-man tournament to become the inaugural champion.	
2	Kaz Hayashi	September 11, 2004	K-DOJO Club-K Super Downtown	Tokyo, Japan	1	121	2	This was also for Hayashi's AJPW Junior Heavyweight Championship.	
3	Taka Michinoku	January 10, 2005	K-DOJO Club-K Super Kick	Tokyo, Japan	1	361	8	This was also for the World Junior Heavyweight Championship.	
4	Joe	January 6, 2006	K-DOJO Club-K Super Kick	Tokyo, Japan	1	276	3		
5	Kengo Mashimo	October 9, 2006	House show	Tokyo, Japan	1	552	5		
6	Yuji Hino	April 13, 2008	K-DOJO Club-K Super Ev. 7	Tokyo, Japan	1	118	2		
7	Kengo Mashimo	August 9, 2008	K-DOJO Super Big Show Chiba Hakkenden	Chiba, Japan	2	246	2		
8	Taka Michinoku	April 12, 2009	K-DOJO Club-K Super Ev. 7	Chiba, Japan	2	189	4		
9	Kazma	October 18, 2009	K-DOJO Club-K Super Outbreak 2009	Chiba, Japan	1	301	5		
10	Yuji Hino	August 15, 2010	K-DOJO Super Big Show Chiba Hakkenden	Chiba, Japan	2	307	4		
11	Kengo Mashimo	June 18, 2011	K-DOJO Club-K Super Take	Chiba, Japan	3	431	10		
12	Daisuke Sekimoto	August 22, 2012	K-Dojo Club-K Super In Shinjuku FACE	Chiba, Japan	1	83	3		
13	Yuji Hino	November 13, 2012	K-DOJO Club-K Super In Korakuen 2012	Chiba, Japan	3	152	1		
14	Taishi Takizawa	April 14, 2013	K-DOJO CLUB-K SUPER Evolution 11 ~ K-DOJO 11th Anniversary	Chiba, Japan	1	79	0		
—	Vacated	July 2, 2013	—	Chiba, Japan	—	—	—	The title was vacated after Takizawa was arrested for voyeurism.	
15	Kengo Mashimo	September 1, 2013	K-DOJO Sea King Tournament	Chiba, Japan	4	224	4	Mashimo defeated Ryuichi Sekine in the finals of the 2013 Sea King Tournament to win the vacant title.	
16	Saburo Inematsu	April 13, 2014	K-DOJO 12th Anniversary Show ~ CLUB-K SUPER Evolution 12	Tokyo, Japan	1	70	1		
17	Miyawaki	June 22, 2014	K-DOJO Club-K Super In Osaka	Osaka, Japan	1	63	1	Won by referee stoppage after Inematsu dislocated his left shoulder. Initially Miyawaki refused the title, but was officially recognized as the champion on June 25.	
18	Kengo Mashimo	August 24, 2014	K-DOJO Club-K Super In TKP	Chiba, Japan	5	231	8		
19	Yuji Hino	April 12, 2015	K-DOJO Club-K Super Evolution 13	Tokyo, Japan	4	147	2		
20	Tank Nagai	September 6, 2015	K-DOJO Club-K Super In TKP	Chiba, Japan	1	329	6		
21	Kaji Tomato	July 31, 2016	K-DOJO Club-K Super In TKP Garden City Chiba	Chiba, Japan	1	20	0		
22	Kengo Mashimo	August 20, 2016	K-DOJO Club-K Super In Blue Field	Chiba, Japan	6	281	5		
23	Isami Kodaka	May 28, 2017	K-DOJO Tokyo Big Show	Tokyo, Japan	1	113	2		
24	Tank Nagai	September 18, 2017	K-DOJO Tokyo Big Show	Tokyo, Japan	2	27	0		
25	Taishi Takizawa	October 15, 2017	K-DOJO Tokyo Big Show	Tokyo, Japan	2	455	6		
26	Shu Asakawa	January 13, 2019	K-DOJO GRAND SLAM In Korakuen Hall	Tokyo, Japan	1	90	2		
27	Ayato Yoshida	April 13, 2019	K-DOJO 17th Anniversary GRAND SLAM In Korakuen Hall	Tokyo, Japan	1	43	0		
—	Deactivated	May 26, 2019	—	—	—	—	—	The title was deactivated due to Kaientai Dojo rebranding as Active Advance Pro Wrestling. The title was replaced by the 2AW Openweight Championship.	

== Combined reigns ==
October 23, 2026.

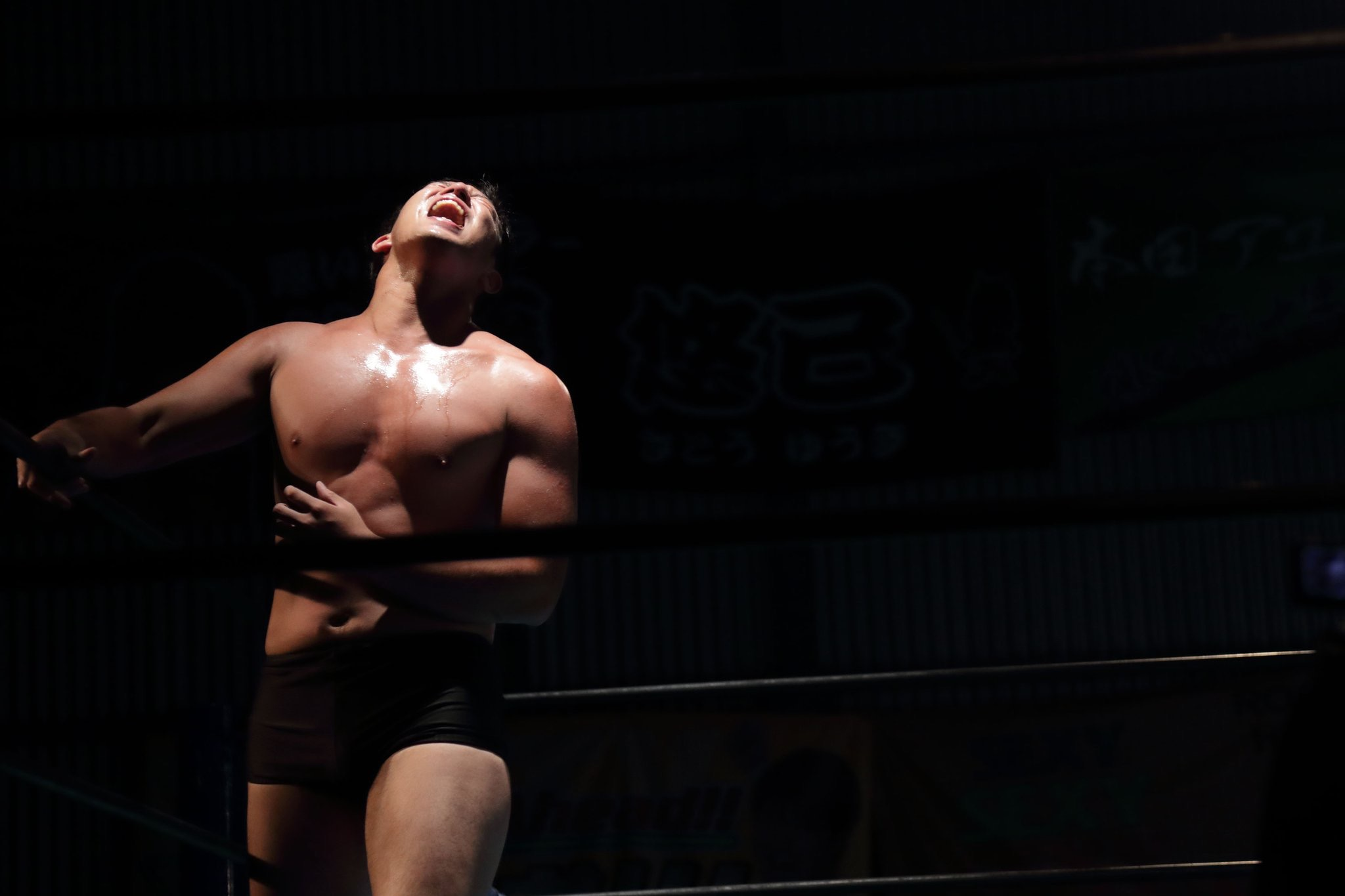
Final champion Ayato Yoshida

Rank	Wrestler	No. of reigns	Combined defenses	Combined days
1	Kengo Mashimo	6	34	1,965
2	Yuji Hino	4	9	724
3	Taka Michinoku	2	12	549
4	Taishi Takizawa	2	6	534
5	Tank Nagai	2	6	356
6	Kazma	1	5	301
7	Joe	1	3	276
8	Kaz Hayashi	1	2	121
9	Isami Kodaka	1	2	113
10	Daisuke Sekimoto	1	3	83
11	Shu Asakawa	1	2	90
12	Hi69	1	1	70
12	Saburo Inematsu	1	1	70
14	Miyawaki	1	1	63
15	Ayato Yoshida	1	0	43
16	Kaji Tomato	1	0	20
