= UWA World Middleweight Championship =

Professional wrestling championship

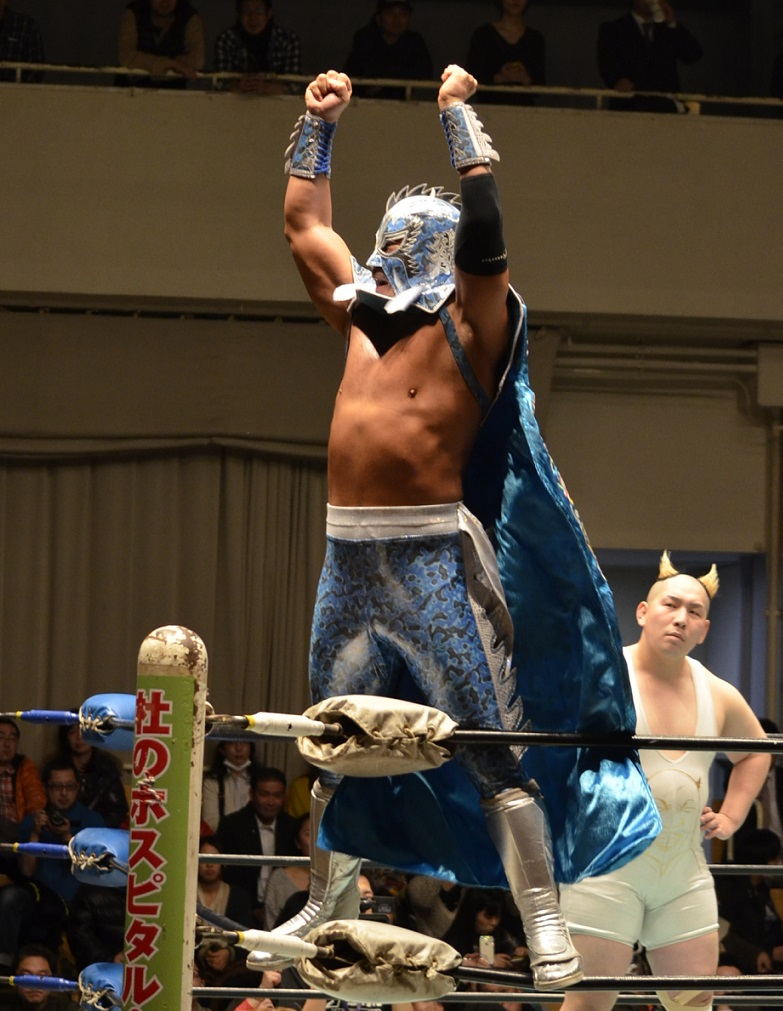
- Último Dragón, three time champion

Details
- Promotion: Universal Wrestling Association; Michinoku Pro Wrestling and Toryumon Japan; Kaientai Dojo; JTO
- Date established: November 26, 1975
- Current champion: Naoya Akama
- Date won: August 11, 2025
Statistics
- First champion: Rene Guajardo
- Most reigns: Último Dragón (5 reigns)

The UWA World Middleweight Championship (Campeonato Mundial de Peso Medio UWA in Spanish), also known as the UWA World Light Heavyweight Championship (Campeonato Mundial Semi Completo de UWA in Spanish), is a professional wrestling championship originally created and sanctioned by the Mexican lucha libre promotion Universal Wrestling Association (UWA) from 1976 until the UWA closed in 1995. Upon the closing of the UWA, the title migrated to Japan's Michinoku Pro Wrestling, Toryumon Japan and Kaientai Dojo promotions. Currently, the title resides in Professional Wrestling Just Tap Out (JTO).

As a professional wrestling championship, the title is not won not by actual competition, but by a scripted ending to a match determined by the bookers and match makers. (Note: Hornbaker (2016) p. 550: "Professional wrestling is a sport in which match finishes are predetermined. Thus, win–loss records are not indicative of a wrestler's genuine success based on their legitimate abilities – but on now much, or how little they were pushed by promoters") On occasion, the promotion declares a championship vacant, which means there is no champion at that point in time. This can either be due to a storyline, (Note: Duncan & Will (2000) p. 271, Chapter: Texas: NWA American Tag Team Title [World Class, Adkisson] "Championship held up and rematch ordered because of the interference of manager Gary Hart") or real life issues such as a champion suffering an injury being unable to defend the championship, (Note: Duncan & Will (2000) p. 20, Chapter: (United States: 19th Century & widely defended titles – NWA, WWF, AWA, IW, ECW, NWA) NWA/WCW TV Title "Rhodes stripped on 85/10/19 for not defending the belt after having his leg broken by Ric Flair and Ole & Arn Anderson") or leaving the company. (Note: Duncan & Will (2000) p. 201, Chapter: (Memphis, Nashville) Memphis: USWA Tag Team Title "Vacant on 93/01/18 when Spike leaves the USWA.")

There have been a total of 82 reigns shared between 53 different champions. The current champion is Naoya Akama who is in his second reign.

== Title history ==
Key
No.	Overall reign number
Reign	Reign number for the specific champion
Days	Number of days held
N/A	Unknown information
†	Championship change is unrecognized by the promotion
+	Current reign is changing daily

No.	Champion	Championship change			Reign statistics		Notes	Ref.
No.	Champion	Date	Event	Location	Reign	Days	Notes	Ref.
Universal Wrestling Association (UWA)
1	Rene Guajardo	November 26, 1975	Live event	Mexico City	1	158	Defeated Aníbal to become the first champion.	(Note: Duncan & Will (2000) p. 399, Chapter: MEXICO: UWA World Middleweight Title [Flores, Mora])
2	Gran Hamada	May 2, 1976	Live event	Monterrey, Nuevo León	1	182		
3	Rene Guajardo	October 31, 1976	Live event	Monterrey, Nuevo León	2	357		
4	Aníbal	October 23, 1977	Live event	Monterrey, Nuevo León	1	476		
5	Jungla Negra	February 11, 1979	Live event	Monterrey, Nuevo León	1	700		
6	Centurión Negro	January 11, 1981	Live event	Monterrey, Nuevo León	1	399		
7	Gran Hamada	February 14, 1982	Live event	Naucalpan, State of Mexico	2	119		
8	Centurión Negro	June 13, 1982	Live event	Monterrey, Nuevo León	2	210		
9	Luis Arizona	January 9, 1983	Live event	Reynosa, Tamaulipas	1	133		
10	Gran Hamada	May 22, 1983	Live event	Monterrey, Nuevo León	3	411		
11	Super Astro	July 6, 1984	Live event	Guadalajara, Jalisco	1	100		
12	El Satánico	October 14, 1984	Live event	Mexico City	1	268		
13	Cachorro Mendoza	July 9, 1985	Live event	N/A	1	134		
14	El Solar	November 20, 1985	Live event	Mexico City	1	(Note: The exact date El Solar vacated the title is unknown, placing his title reign between 132 and 161 days.)		
—	Vacated	April 1986	—	—	—	—	Championship vacated for undocumented reasons.	
15	Valente Fernández	June 29, 1986	Live event	Monterrey, Nuevo León	1	1,163		
16	Cuchillo	September 4, 1989	Live event	Mexico City	1	214		
17	Yoshihiro Asai	April 6, 1990	Live event	Mexico City	1	45		
18	Cuchillo	May 21, 1990	Live event	Puebla, Puebla	2	14		
19	Yoshihiro Asai	June 4, 1990	Live event	Tokyo, Japan	2	207		
20	Super Astro	December 28, 1990	Live event	Tijuana, Baja California	2	32		
21	Negro Casas	January 29, 1991	Live event	Pachuca, Hidalgo	1	787		
22	Último Dragón	March 26, 1993	Live event	Mexico City	3	55	Previously won the title as "Yoshihiro Asai"	
23	El Samurai	May 20, 1993	Live event	Inuyama, Japan	1	4		
24	Último Dragón	May 24, 1993	Live event	Osaka, Japan	4	226		
25	Kōji Ishinriki	January 5, 1994	Live event	Osaka, Japan	1	139		
26	Último Dragón	May 24, 1994	Live event	Mexico City	5	168		
—	Vacated	November 8, 1994	—	Tokyo, Japan	—	—	Title vacated after Dragón wins the NWA World Middleweight Championship from Corazón de León.	
Michinoku Pro Wrestling and Toryumon Japan
27	El Texano	February 12, 1995	Live event	Santo Domingo, Dominican Republic	1	(Note: The exact date El Texano lost the title is unknown, placing his title regin between 323 and 484 days.)	Defeated Takashi Okano to win the vacant title.	
28	Héctor Garza	1996	N/A	N/A	1	(Note: The exact date Héctor Garza won the title is unknown, placing the title reign between 484 and 323 days.)		
29	Masayoshi Motegi	June 11, 1996	Live event	Tokyo, Japan	1	0	Won the title when Garza was knocked out accidentally during the match.	
—	Vacated	June 11, 1996	Live event	Tokyo, Japan	—	—	Motegi immediately vacated the title after winning it.	
30	Tiger Mask	September 23, 1996	Live event	Towada, Japan	1	155		
—	Vacated	February 25, 1997	—	—	—	—	Title vacated after Tiger Mask is injured on December 11, 1996.	
31	Shoichi Funaki	March 19, 1997	Live event	Yonezawa, Japan	1	66	Defeated El Pantera to win the vacant title.	
32	Minoru Tanaka	May 24, 1997	Live event	Nagoya, Japan	1	330		
—	Vacated	April 19, 1998	—	—	—	—	Title vacated after defending against Tiger Mask.	
33	The Willow	June 14, 1998	Live event	Iwate, Japan	1	(Note: The exact date on which the Willow vacated the title is unknown, placing the title reign between 1 and 200 days.)	Defeated Ikuto Hidaka to win the vacant title.	
—	Vacated	1998	—	—	—	—	Championship vacated after Willow began his contract with the World Wrestling Federation.	
34	Silver Wolf	May 25, 2002	Live event	Tokyo, Japan	1	(Note: The exact date on which Silver Wolf vacated is unknown, placing the title reign between 99 and 128 days.)	Silver Wolf defeated Hi69 in a tournament final to win the vacant title.	
—	Vacated	September 2002	—	—	—	—	Championship vacated for undocumented reasons.	
Kaientai Dojo
35	Hi69	October 27, 2002	Live event	Tokyo, Japan	1	188	Defeated PABLO in a tournament final to win the vacant title.	
36	Yasu Urano	May 24, 2003	Live event	Chiba, Japan	1	154		
37	Mr. X3	October 25, 2003	Live event	Chiba, Japan	1	183		
38	Sambo Oishi	April 25, 2004	Live event	Tokyo, Japan	1	188		
39	Onryo	October 30, 2004	Live event	Chiba, Japan	1	105		
40	GENTARO	February 12, 2005	Live event	Chiba, Japan	1	7		
41	Boso Boy Raito	February 19, 2005	Live event	Shiwa, Japan	1	410		
42	PSYCHO	April 5, 2006	Live event	Tokyo, Japan	1	214		
43	Shiori Asahi	November 5, 2006	Live event	Fukuoka, Japan	1	303		
44	Boso Boy Raito	September 4, 2007	Live event	Tokyo, Japan	2	282		
45	Sambo Oishi	June 12, 2008	Live event	Tokyo, Japan	2	89		
46	Men's Teioh	September 9, 2008	Live event	Chiba, Japan	1	54		
47	Sambo Oishi	November 2, 2008	Live event	Tokyo, Japan	3	133	Match was also for the Independent World Junior Heavyweight Championship.	
48	Quiet Storm	March 15, 2009	Live event	Tokyo, Japan	1	147		
49	PSYCHO	August 9, 2009	Live event	Chiba, Japan	2	97		
50	Shinobu	November 14, 2009	Live event	Tokyo, Japan	1	58		
51	Kaji Tomato	January 11, 2010	Live event	Chiba, Japan	1	303		
52	Yasu Urano	November 10, 2010	Live event	Tokyo, Japan	2	263		
53	Kaji Tomato	July 31, 2011	Live event	Chiba, Japan	2	98		
54	Shiori Asahi	November 6, 2011	Live event	Tokyo, Japan	2	231	This was a three-way match, also involving Marines Mask II.	
55	Daigoro Kashiwa	June 24, 2012	Live event	Yokohama, Japan	1	133	This was a three-way match, also involving Boso Boy Raito.	
56	Yuki Sato	November 4, 2012	Live event	Yokohama, Japan	1	161	This was a three-way match, also involving Hiro Tonai.	
57	Taka Michinoku	April 14, 2013	Live event	Tokyo, Japan	1	119		
58	Ryuichi Sekine	August 11, 2013	Live event	Chiba, Japan	1	119		
59	Makoto Oishi	December 8, 2013	Live event	Chiba, Japan	4	259	Previously won the title as "Sambo Oishi".	
60	Kaji Tomato	August 24, 2014	Live event	Chiba, Japan	3	154		
61	Yuki Sato	January 25, 2015	Live event	Chiba, Japan	2	245		
62	Kaji Tomato	September 27, 2015	Live event	Shizuoka, Japan	4	35		
63	Hiro Tonai	November 1, 2015	Club-K Super in Korakuen Hall	Tokyo, Japan	1	141		
64	Men's Teioh	March 21, 2016	Club-K Tour in Kitasenju	Tokyo, Japan	2	132		
65	Shiori Asahi	July 31, 2016	Club-K Super in TKP Garden City Chiba	Chiba, Japan	3	98	This match was also contested for the Independent World Junior Heavyweight Championship.	
66	Ayumu Honda	November 6, 2016	Club-K Super in Korakuen Hall	Tokyo, Japan	1	497	This was a three-way match, also involving Kaji Tomato.	
67	Masamune	March 18, 2018	K-DOJO Tokyo Big Show	Tokyo, Japan	1	133		
68	Taka Michinoku	July 29, 2018	K-DOJO Grand Slam In TKP Garden City Chiba	Chiba, Japan	2	84		
69	Kaji Tomato	October 21, 2018	K-DOJO Grand Slam In Korakuen Hall	Tokyo, Japan	5	193		
70	Fuminori Abe	May 2, 2019	K-DOJO Chiba Festival 2019 - Exchange? Counter? BASARA DAY	Chiba, Japan	1	49		
71	Kyu Mogami	June 20, 2019	Live event	Chiba, Japan	1	N/A	Mogami's reign length is unknown as the title was abandoned over Kaientai Dojo's rebranding into Active Advance Pro Wrestling.	
—	Deactivated	2019	—	—	—	—	The title was abandoned somewhere after September 2019.	
Just Tap Out (JTO)
72	Black Chango	February 18, 2021	JTO Just Tap Out In Shinjuku Face	Tokyo, Japan	1	29	Black Eagle defeated Eagle Mask to win the reactivated title. During this reign, the title is re-named to the UWA World Light Heavyweight Championship.	
73	Carbell Ito	March 19, 2021	JTO Kaku	Tokyo, Japan	1	193		
—	Vacated	September 28, 2021	—	—	—	—		
74	Black Eagle	November 18, 2021	JTO Itadaki	Tokyo, Japan	1	470	Black Eagle defeated Eagle Mask to win the vacant title.	
75	Carbell Ito	March 3, 2023	JTO 2023 Tournament - Day 3	Tokyo, Japan	2	359		
—	Vacated	February 25, 2024	—	—	—	—	The title was vacated by Ito under unknown circumstances.	
76	Naoya Akama	March 1, 2024	JTO	Tokyo, Japan	1	70	Defeated ARA, Blazer Tanai, Hiro Iijima, Kensuke, Mr. Mask and Yuu Yamagata in a battle royal to win the vacant title.	
77	Sumika Yanagawa	May 10, 2024	JTO Michinoku The Super Best 2024	Tokyo, Japan	1	111	Defeated Naoya Akama in a battle royal also involving ARA, Arata, Blazer Tanni, Kensuke, Maxi, Mizuna and Mr. Mask. Yanagawa became the first female wrestler to win the title.	
78	Misa Kagura	August 29, 2024	JTO Girls Special	Tokyo, Japan	1	64		
79	Bomber Tatsuya	November 1, 2024	JTO	Tokyo, Japan	1	85	Defeated Misa Kagura in a battle royal also involving Big Haruka, Kensuke, Mizuha, Mr. Mask, Nanase, rhythm, Toa and Yuku Kagatobi.	
80	Akira Jumonji	January 25, 2025	JTO Saturday Fight	Chiba, Japan	1	134		
81	Bomber Tatsuya	June 8, 2025	JTO House	Yokohama, Japan	2	64		
82	Naoya Akama	August 11, 2025	JTO Special	Yokohama, Japan	2	446+		

== Combined reigns ==
As of October 31, 2026.

†	Indicates the current champion
¤	The exact length of the title reign is uncertain.

Rank	Wrestler	No. of reigns	Combined days
1	Valente Fernández	1	1,163
2	Negro Casas	1	787
3	Kaji Tomato	5	783
4	Gran Hamada	3	712
5	Yoshihiro Asai/Último Dragón	5	701
6	Jungla Negra	1	700
7	Boso Boy Raito	2	692
8	Makoto Oishi	4	669
9	Shiori Asahi	3	632
10	Centurión Negro	2	609
11	Carbell Ito	2	552
12	Naoya Akama †	2	516+
13	Rene Guajardo	2	515
14	Ayumu Honda	1	497
15	Aníbal	1	476
16	Black Eagle	1	470
17	Yasu Urano	2	417
18	Yuki Sato	2	406
19	Minoru Tanaka	1	330
20	PSYCHO	2	311
21	El Satánico	1	268
22	Cuchillo	2	228
23	Taka Michinoku	2	203
24	Hi69	1	188
25	Men's Teioh	2	186
26	Mr. X3/Silver Wolf	2	183¤
27	Tiger Mask	1	155
28	Bomber Tatsuya	2	149
29	Quiet Storm	1	147
30	Hiro Tonai	1	141
31	Kōji Ishinriki	1	139
32	Akira Jumonji	1	134
32	Cachorro Mendoza	1	134
34	Daigoro Kashiwa	1	133
34	Luis Arizona	1	133
34	Masmune	1	133
37	Super Astro	2	132
38	Ryuichi Sekine	1	119
39	Sumika Yanagawa	1	111
40	Onryo	1	105
41	Shoichi Funaki	1	66
42	Misa Kagura	1	64
43	Shinobu	1	58
44	Fuminori Abe	1	49
45	Black Chango	1	29
46	GENTARO	1	7
47	El Samurai	1	4
48	Masayoshi Motegi	1	<1
49	El Solar	1	N/A¤
49	El Texano	1	N/A¤
49	Héctor Garza	1	N/A¤
49	Kyu Mogami	1	N/A¤
49	The Willow	1	N/A¤
