= 2AW Tag Team Championship =

- Current design of the titles (2022–present)

Details
- Promotion: Active Advance Pro Wrestling
- Date established: February 14, 2020
- Current champions: Ayato Yoshida and Minoru Fujita
- Date won: October 12, 2026
Statistics
- First champions: Ayato Yoshida and Tank Nagai
- Most reigns: As a team (2 reigns): Kengo Mashimo and Tatsuya Hanami; Buttobe Missile Kickers (Daiju Wakamatsu and Taishi Takizawa); Koen (Takuro Niki and Tatsuya Hanami); As an individual (5 reigns): Tatsuya Hanami
- Longest reign: Kengo Mashimo and Kyu Mogami (335 days)
- Shortest reign: Ayato Yoshida and Tank Nagai (40 days)
- Oldest champion: Minoru Fujita (49 years, 37 days)
- Youngest champion: Takuro Niki (21 years, 317 days)

The 2AW Tag Team Championship is a professional wrestling tag team championship created and promoted by the Japanese promotion Active Advance Pro Wrestling. There have been a total of seventeen reigns shared between fifteen different teams consisting of twenty distinctive champions. The current title holders are Makoto Oishi and Shiori Asahi who are in their first reign as a team.

== Title history ==
There have been a total of twenty reigns shared between seventeen different teams consisting of twenty-one distinctive champions. The first champions were Ayato Yoshida and Tank Nagai. Yoshida, Kengo Mashimo and Tatsuya Hanami hold the record for the most individual reigns with three each, while Kengo Mashimo and Tatsuya Hanami hold the record for the most reigns as a team with two. The current champions are Ayato Yoshida and Minoru Fujita who defeated Ayumu Honda and Kengo to win the titles at 2AW Grand Slam In Korakuen Hall on October 12, 2026.

Key
No.	Overall reign number
Reign	Reign number for the specific team—reign numbers for the individuals are in parentheses, if different
Days	Number of days held
Defenses	Number of successful defenses
<1	Reign lasted less than a day
+	Current reign is changing daily

No.	Champion	Championship change			Reign statistics			Notes	Ref.
No.	Champion	Date	Event	Location	Reign	Days	Defenses	Notes	Ref.
1	Ayato Yoshida and Tank Nagai	February 14, 2020	2AW	Tokyo, Japan	1	40	0	Defeated Kyu Mogami and Minoru Fujita in a tournament final to become the inaugural champions.	
2	Chango and Kaji Tomato	March 25, 2020	2AW GRAND SLAM In Korakuen Hall	Tokyo, Japan	1	76	3		
3	Tempest (Ayumu Honda and Taishi Takizawa)	June 9, 2020	2AW GRAND SLAM In Samurai! TV	Chiba, Japan	1	54	0		
4	Kengo Mashimo and Tatsuya Hanami	August 2, 2020	2AW GRAND SLAM In Korakuen Hall	Tokyo, Japan	1	75	3		
5	The Andrew Kingdom (Shigehiro Irie and The Andrew King Takuma)	October 16, 2020	2AW GRAND SLAM In Korakuen Hall	Tokyo, Japan	1	107	1		
6	Kengo Mashimo and Tatsuya Hanami	January 31, 2021	2AW Grand Slam In 2AW Square	Chiba, Japan	2 (2, 2)	210	5		
7	Toll Glänz (Kotaro Yoshino and Tank Nagai)	August 29, 2021	2AW Grand Slam In TKP Garden City Chiba	Chiba, Japan	1 (1, 2)	77	2		
8	The Rule (Ayato Yoshida and The Andrew King Takuma)	November 14, 2021	2AW Grand Slam in TKP Garden City Chiba	Chiba, Japan	1 (2, 2)	101	3		
9	Voodoo Murders (Chris Vice and Yoshikazu Yokoyama)	February 23, 2022	2AW Infinity ~ 2022 Winter	Chiba, Japan	1	46	0		
10	The Rule (Ayato Yoshida and Excilio)	April 10, 2022	ZERO1 Osu Premium Show ZERO1 20th & 21st Anniversary Pro Wrestling	Tokyo, Japan	1 (3, 1)	154	2		
11	Koen (Takuro Niki and Tatsuya Hanami)	September 11, 2022	2AW Grand Slam In Korakuen Hall	Tokyo, Japan	1 (1, 3)	224	4		
12	Buttobe Missile Kickers (Daiju Wakamatsu and Taishi Takizawa)	April 23, 2023	2AW Grand Slam In 2AW Square	Tokyo, Japan	1 (1, 2)	91	1		
13	Bug's Mutation (Ayumu Honda and Chango)	July 23, 2023	2AW Grand Slam In 2AW Square	Tokyo, Japan	1 (2, 2)	133	2	This was a three-way tag team match also involving Kazma Sakamoto and Kengo Mashimo.	
14	MJ2 (Kengo Mashimo and Naka Shuma)	December 3, 2023	2AW Grand Slam In Korakuen Hall	Tokyo, Japan	1 (3, 1)	266	8		
15	Starlight Dreamers (Ayame Sasamura and Kotaro Yoshino)	August 25, 2024	2AW Grand Slam In TKP Garden City Chiba	Tokyo, Japan	1 (1, 2)	63	0	Sasamura became the first ever female wrestler to win the titles.	
16	Buttobe Missile Kickers (Daiju Wakamatsu and Taishi Takizawa)	October 27, 2024	2AW Grand Slam In TKP Garden City Chiba	Tokyo, Japan	2 (2, 3)	147	4		
17	Makoto Oishi and Shiori Asahi	March 23, 2025	2AW Grand Slam In Korakuen Hall	Tokyo, Japan	1	91	1		
18	Koen (Takuro Niki and Tatsuya Hanami)	June 22, 2025	2AW 6th Anniversary Grand Slam In TKP Garden City Chiba	Chiba, Japan	2 (2, 4)	29	0		
19	MJ2 (Kengo Mashimo and Kyu Mogami)	July 21, 2025	2AW Grand Slam In 2AW Square	Chiba, Japan	1 (4, 1)	335	7		
20	The Red Line (Tatsuya Hanami and Yuya Aoki)	June 21, 2026	2AW 7th Anniversary	Chiba, Japan	1 (5, 1)	51	1		
21	Ayumu Honda and Kengo	August 11, 2026	2AW Beer Garden	Chiba, Japan	1 (3, 1)	62	0		
22	Ayato Yoshida and Minoru Fujita	October 12, 2026	2AW Grand Slam In Korakuen Hall	Tokyo, Japan	1 (4, 1)	41+	1		

=== Combined reigns ===
As of November 22, 2026.

†	Indicates the current champion

Rank	Team	No. of reigns	Combined defenses	Combined days
1	MJ2 (Kengo Mashimo and Kyu Mogami)	1	7	335
2	Kengo Mashimo and Tatsuya Hanami	2	8	285
3	MJ2 (Kengo Mashimo and Naka Shuma)	1	8	266
4	Koen (Takuro Niki and Tatsuya Hanami)	2	4	253
5	Buttobe Missile Kickers (Daiju Wakamatsu and Taishi Takizawa)	2	5	238
6	The Rule (Ayato Yoshida and Excilio)	1	2	154
7	Bug's Mutation (Ayumu Honda and Chango)	1	2	133
8	The Andrew Kingdom (Shigehiro Irie and The Andrew King Takuma)	1	1	107
9	The Rule (Ayato Yoshida and The Andrew King Takuma)	1	3	101
10	Makoto Oishi and Shiori Asahi	1	1	91
11	Toll Glänz (Kotaro Yoshino and Tank Nagai)	1	2	77
12	Chango and Kaji Tomato	1	3	76
13	Starlight Dreamers (Ayame Sasamura and Kotaro Yoshino)	1	0	63
14	Ayumu Honda and Kengo	1	0	62
15	Tempest (Ayumu Honda and Taishi Takizawa)	1	0	54
16	The Red Line (Tatsuya Hanami and Yuya Aoki)	1	1	51
17	Voodoo Murders (Chris Vice and Yoshikazu Yokoyama)	1	0	46
18	Ayato Yoshida and Minoru Fujita †	1	1	41+
19	Ayato Yoshida and Tank Nagai	1	0	40

=== By wrestler ===
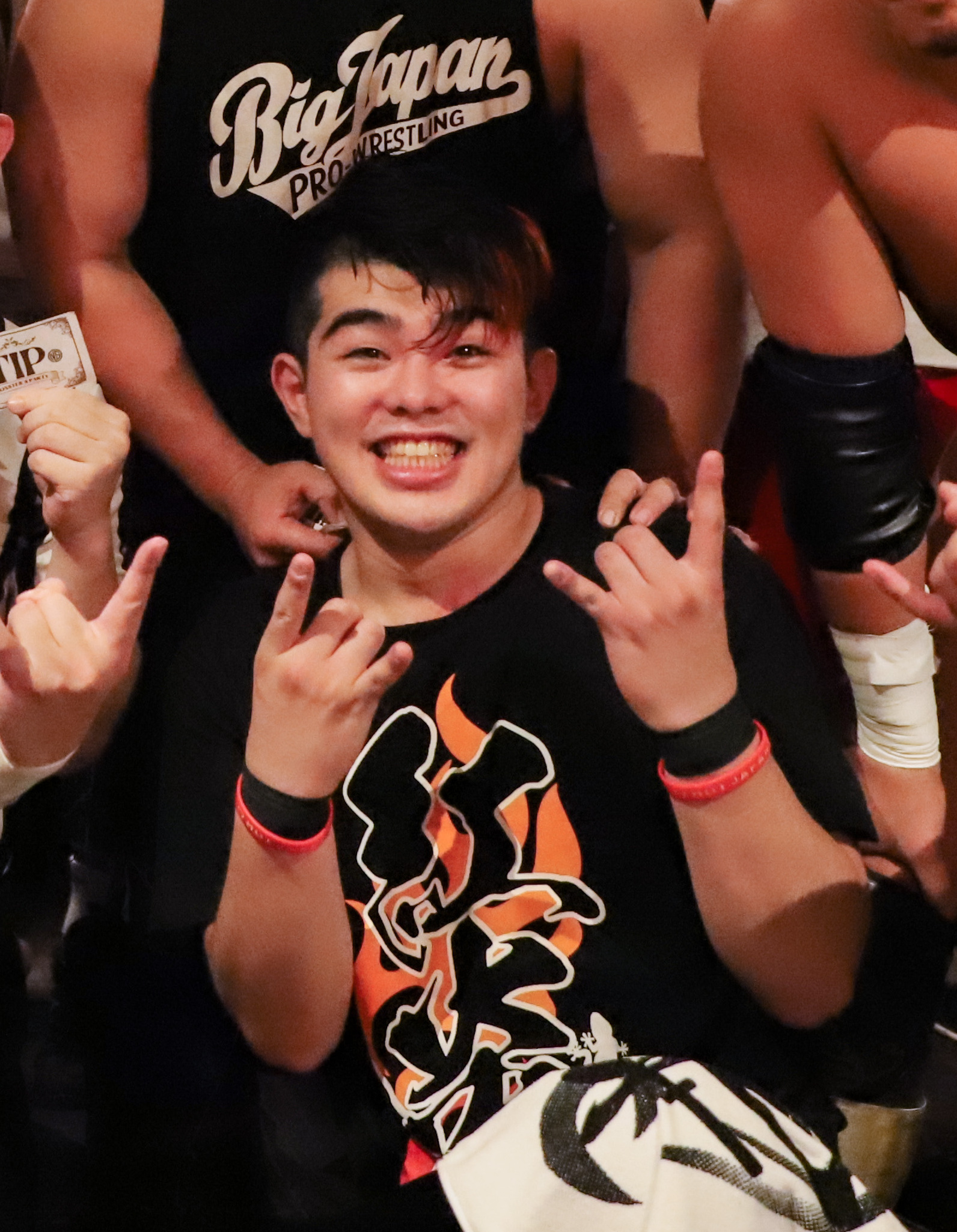
Record five-time champion as individual, Tatsuya Hanami.

Rank	Wrestler	No. of reigns	Combined defenses	Combined days
1	Kengo Mashimo	4	23	886
2	Tatsuya Hanami	5	13	589
3	Ayato Yoshida †	4	6	337+
4	Kyu Mogami	1	7	335
5	Taishi Takizawa	3	5	292
5	Naka Shuma	1	8	266
7	Takuro Niki	2	4	253
8	Ayumu Honda	3	2	249
9	Daiju Wakamatsu	2	5	238
10	Chango	2	5	209
11	The Andrew King Takuma	2	4	208
12	Excilio	1	2	154
13	Kotaro Yoshino	2	2	140
14	Tank Nagai	2	2	117
15	Shigehiro Irie	1	1	107
16	Makoto Oishi	1	1	91
16	Shiori Asahi	1	1	91
18	Kaji Tomato	1	3	76
19	Ayame Sasamura	1	0	63
20	Kengo	1	0	62
21	Yuya Aoki	1	1	51
22	Chris Vice	1	0	46
22	Yoshikazu Yokoyama	1	0	46
24	Minoru Fujita †	1	1	41+
