= Tomato Kaji =

Japanese professional wrestler

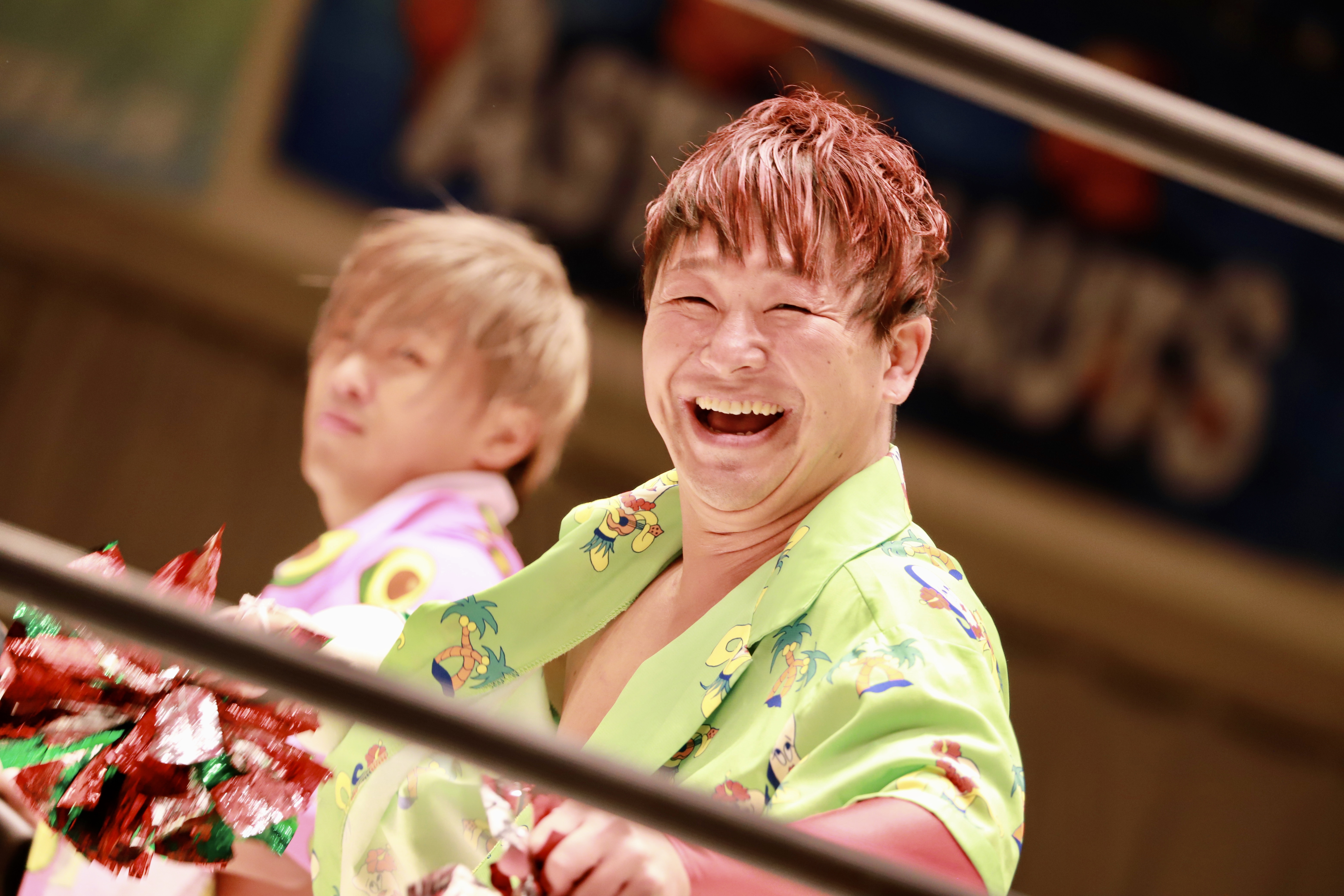
- Kaji in March 2020

Personal information
- Born: January 19, 1987 (age 39) Katsushika, Tokyo, Japan

Professional wrestling career
- Ring names: Cheetah Tomato; Tomato Kaji; Yamato Kaji; Tomato; Trans-Am★Tomato
- Billed height: 170 cm (5 ft 7 in)
- Billed weight: 75 kg (165 lb)
- Trained by: Taka Michinoku
- Debut: 2006

Tomato Kaji (梶トマト, Kaji Tomato) is a Japanese professional wrestler currently working as a freelancer and is best known for his tenure with the Japanese promotions Kaientai Dojo, Big Japan Pro Wrestling, All Japan Pro Wrestling and many others.

== Professional wrestling career ==
=== Independent circuit (2006–present) ===
As part freelancer, Kaji is known for competing in multiple promotions of the Japanese independent scene. He participated in one of the longest matches in professional wrestling history, an 108-man battle royal at Tenka Sanbun no Kei: New Year's Eve Special, a cross-over event held between Big Japan Pro Wrestling (BJW), DDT and Kaientai Dojo from December 31, 2009, competing against other infamous wrestlers such as Great Kojika, Danshoku Dino, Kenny Omega, Tajiri, Gota Ihashi, Kota Ibushi and many others. Kaji often competed in independent shows such as TAKA & Taichi Produce TAKATaichi House In Yokohama from December 22, 2018, where he wrestled in a 16-person battle royal also involving Taichi, Taka Michinoku, Jun Kasai, Yoshinobu Kanemaru, Tomoaki Honma and even female opponents such as Saori Anou, Ayame Sasamura, Natsumi Maki and Rina Shingaki. At W-1 Wrestle-1 Tour 2019 Trans Magic from March 2, he teamed up with Manabu Soya, Seigo Tachibana and Jiro Kuroshio to defeat Andy Wu, Daiki Inaba, Kaz Hayashi and Pegaso Iluminar. At Freedoms/2AW VersuS from June 27, 2021, Kaji teamed up with Shu Asakawa and Toll Glänz (Ayato Yoshida and Tank Nagai) to defeat Daisuke Masaoka, Tomoya Hirata, Toru Sugiura and Yuya Susumu. At BJW/ZERO1/2AW Great Clash, a cross-over event held between BJW, Pro Wrestling Zero1 and 2AW on December 24, 2021, Kaji teamed up with Shu Asakawa and Chicharito Shoki to defeat Shoki Kitamura, Takumi Baba and Takuya Sugawara.

=== All Japan Pro Wrestling (2008; 2014–2020) ===
Kaji debuted in All Japan Pro Wrestling during the U-30 Tag Team Tournament where he teamed up with Taishi Takizawa in a losing effort to Kushida and T28 in the second round matches from February 15, 2008. After six years, he returned for various of the promotion's signature events such as at the AJPW Junior League, making his first appearance at the 2014 edition where he competed in the Block A, scoring a total of two points after going against Kotaro Suzuki, Atsushi Aoki, Último Dragón and Ryuji Hijikata. Another event in which he fought is the AJPW Junior Tag League, making his first appearance at the 2018 edition if the event where he teamed up with Shiori Asahi and scored a total of six points after going against the teams of Koji Iwamoto and Tajiri, Atsushi Aoki and Hikaru Sato, Masaaki Mochizuki and Shun Skywalker, Shuji Kondo and Kotaro Suzuki, Atsushi Maruyama and Masashi Takeda, and Black Menso~re and Black Tiger VII.

On the sixth night of the 2014 Super Power Series from May 25, Kaji participated in a six-man battle royal for the Ironman Heavymetalweight Championship won by Masao Inoue and also involving Jun Akiyama, Menso-re Oyaji, Sushi and Zeus. At Chiba Extra Dream 10: 10th Anniversary Show on May 7, 2016, Kaji unsuccessfully competed for the AJPW World Junior Heavyweight Championship, falling short to Atsushi Aoki.

=== DDT Pro-Wrestling (2009–present) ===
Kaji often competes in various DDT Pro-Wrestling events. His first one was Dramatic Next Door from July 6, 2009, where he teamed up with his Monster Plant tag team partner Kengo Mashimo in a losing effort against Harashima and Kudo. The next event in which he competed occurred four years later, the Sapporo Pro-Wrestling Festa 2013: Young Generation Battle, a cross-over event between DDT, BJW and Kaientai Dojo from October 14, 2013, where he teamed up with Atsushi Ohashi to defeat Hiroshi Fukuda and Soma Takao. Kaji is also known for competing in the Pro-Wrestling Basara branch of events, such as Basara 46 from September 9, 2017, where he teamed up with Sagat and Trans Am Shinya in a losing effort against Iron Priest (Fuma, Hagane Shinnou and Yusuke Kubo) as a result of a six-man tag team match. At the 2022 edition of the Ultimate Tag League, at a show from February 20, Kaji teamed up with Yuji Hino and Yukio Naya in a losing effort against Burning (Jun Akiyama, Tetsuya Endo and Yusuke Okada).

=== Pro Wrestling Noah (2009–2015) ===
Kaji sporadically wrestled for Pro Wrestling Noah. He made his first appearance at Sem/Kensuke Office, a cross-over event held in partnership with the Dianond Ring promotion on March 11, 2009, where he fell short to Ippei Ota. The single signature event of the promotion in which Kaji competed was the 2015 edition of the Global Junior Heavyweight Tag League where he teamed up with Shiori Asahi, placing themselves in the Block B and scoring a total of four points after going against the teams of Atsushi Kotoge and Daisuke Harada, Billyken Kid and Buffalo, Hajime Ohara and Kenoh, and Hitoshi Kumano and Super Crazy.

=== New Japan Pro Wrestling (2010–2016) ===
Kaji also competed for New Japan Pro Wrestling. On the first night of the NEVER.9: Road To The Super Junior 2 Days Tournament from April 13, he fell short to Madoka. On the second night from April 15, he teamed up with Yusuke Kodama and Captain New Japan in a losing effort against Chaos (Gedo, Jado and Tomohiro Ishii). After winning a tournament to qualify for the 2016 Super J-Cup, hosted by Kaientai Dojo's Club K-3000 event from June 11, Kaji entered the tournament only to fall short to Matt Sydal in the first-round matches from July 20. On the second night of the tournament, he teamed up with Bushi and Gurukun Mask to defeat Eita, Yuma Aoyagi and David Finlay in a six-man tag team match.

== Championships and accomplishments ==
- Kaientai Dojo/Active Advance Pro Wrestling
  - 2AW Tag Team Championship (1 time) – with Chango
  - Chiba Six Man Tag Team Championship (2 times) – with Daigoro Kashiwa and Marines Mask (1), and with Chango and Dinosaur Takuma (1)
  - Strongest-K Championship (1 time)
  - Strongest-K Tag Team Championship (6 times) – with Taishi Takizawa (3), Taka Michinoku (2) and Shiori Asahi (1)
  - Unit Special Formation Tournament (2012) – with Yuji Hino, Jonathan Bada and Hiro Tonai
- Big Japan Pro Wrestling
  - BJW Junior Heavyweight Championship (1 time)
  - UWA World Tag Team Championship (1 time) – with Kota Sekifuda
- Kyushu Pro-Wrestling
  - Kyushu Pro Tag Team Championship (1 time) – with Mentai Kid
- Total Triumph Team
  - TTT Indie Unified Six Man Tag Team Championship (1 time) – with Masamune and Chango
- Universal Wrestling Association
  - UWA World Middleweight Championship (5 times)
