= Ayumu Honda =

Japanese professional wrestler

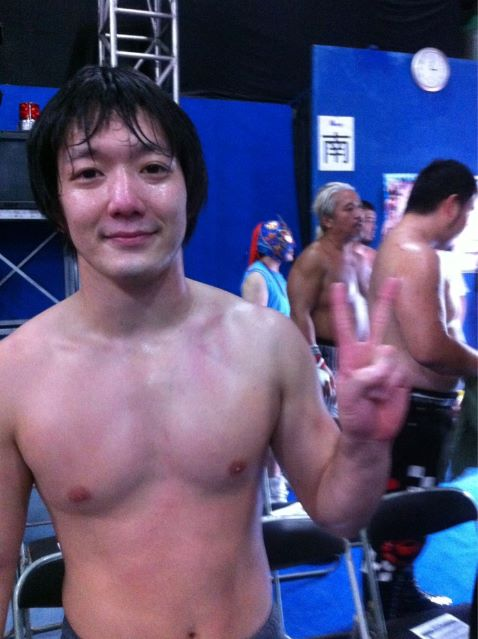
- Honda in September 2012

Personal information
- Born: 26 October 1988 (age 38) Fujioka, Gunma, Japan

Professional wrestling career
- Ring name: Marines Mask III Mabui-kun Ayumu Honda
- Billed height: 163 cm (5 ft 4 in)
- Billed weight: 75 kg (165 lb)
- Debut: 2012

Ayumu Honda (本田アユム, Honda Ayumu) is a Japanese professional wrestler signed to Active Advance Pro Wrestling (2AW) where he is a former two-time 2AW Tag Team Champion. He is also known for his work in various promotions of the Japanese independent scene such as Big Japan Pro Wrestling (BJW).

== Professional wrestling career ==
=== Active Advance Pro Wrestling (2012–present) ===
==== Kaientai Dojo era (2012–2019) ====
Honda made his professional wrestling debut in Kaientai Dojo at K-DOJO 10th Anniversary on April 8, 2012, where he teamed up with Ryuichi Sekine in a losing effort against Hiroki and Yasu Urano in tag team competition. During the Kaientai Dojo banner, Honda is a former three-time Chiba Six Man Tag Team Champion and was part of multiple stables such as "Magatsuki", "Andrew Kingdom" and "Tempest". He is also a former one-time UWA World Middleweight Champion, title which he won at Club-K Super in Korakuen Hall on November 6, 2016 by defeating Shiori Asahi, and a one-time 2AW Tag Team Champion alongside Taishi Takizawa, titles which they won at 2AW GRAND SLAM In Samurai! TV on June 9, 2020 by defeating Chango and Kaji Tomato.

==== 2AW era (2019–present) ====
During the 2AW era of the promotion, Honda has won the 2AW Tag Team Championship on one occasion alongside Chango as part of the "Bug's Mutation" stable by defeating Buttobe Missile Kickers (Daiju Wakamatsu and Taishi Takizawa) at 2AW Grand Slam In 2AW Square on April 23, 2023. Honda is part of the "MJ2" stable.

Honda took part into Tank Nagai's retirement match, a guantlet bout which occurred at 2AW Tank Nagai Kanzen Nensho on February 11, 2022, in which the latter went off against notable opponents such as Shu Asakawa, Tsukushi, Kaji Tomato, Akira Hyodo, Ricky Fuji and others.

=== Japanese independent circuit (2012–present) ===
Honda regularly works for various promotions of the Japanese independent scene as a 2AW talent. He made an appearance for New Japan Pro Wrestling at NJPW Tokyo Game Show 2012 on September 22 where he fell short to Saburo Inematsu. At the New Year's Eve Pro-Wrestling 2012, Honda defeated Gota Ihashi in singles competition. Honda competed in the Tenka Sanbun no Kei series of events in which he made his last appearance at the ninth tour from July 5, 2015, where he teamed up with Bambi as "SFU" to defeat Yuma and Koharu Hinata. In the Super J-Cup 2016 tournament, he defeated Shu Asakawa in the first rounds of the qualifying tournament but fell short to Ayato Yoshida in the next rounds.

Honda made his first appearance in Tenryu Project's 2024 edition of the Ryūkon Cup where he fell short to Yusuke Kodama in the first rounds.

=== Pro-Wrestling Basara (2025–present) ===
Honda made his debut in Pro-Wrestling Basara at BASARA 268 ~ Oji No Kitsune 31 ~ on February 1, 2025, where he teamed up with Trans-Am Hiroshi in a losing effort against Hyakushou Ikki (Fuma and Ryuichi Sekine). At Basara 285: Masho Sakushin on August 3, 2025, Honda teamed up with Kengo Mashimo and defeated Fuma and Sekine to win the Iron Fist Tag Team Championship.

In the Itadaki tournament, Honda made his first appearance at the 2025 edition where he fell short to Fuma in the first rounds.

== Championships and accomplishments ==
- Kaientai Dojo/Active Advance Pro Wrestling
  - Chiba Six Man Tag Team Championship (3 times) – with Kyu Mogami and Yuki Sato (1), Kyu Mogami and Kunio Toshima (1) and Kyu Mogami and Taishi Takizawa (1)
  - 2AW Tag Team Championship (3 times) – with Taishi Takizawa (1), Chango (1) and Kengo (1)
  - UWA World Middleweight Championship (1 time)
- Pro-Wrestling Basara
  - Iron Fist Tag Team Championship (1 time) – with Kengo Mashimo
- Tenryu Project
  - Tenryu Project International Junior Heavyweight Tag Team Championship (1 time, current) – with Keita Yano
