= Kengo Mashimo =

Japanese professional wrestler (born 1978)

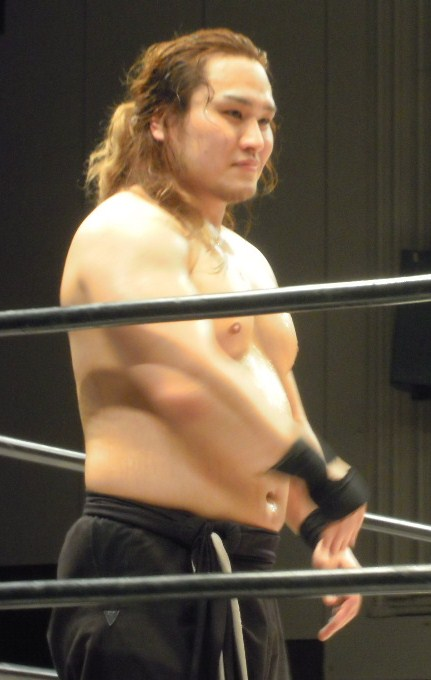
- Mashimo in December 2010

Personal information
- Born: November 25, 1978 (age 47) Maizuru, Kyoto, Japan

Professional wrestling career
- Ring name(s): Kengo Mashimo; Kengo Ohka; Masked Jef; Murakami Takeyoshi; Nazo Fukumen K
- Billed height: 1.80 m (5 ft 11 in)
- Billed weight: 98 kg (216 lb)
- Trained by: Kaientai Dojo; Taka Michinoku
- Debut: April 27, 2001

Kengo Mashimo (真霜拳號, Mashimo Kengo; born November 25, 1978 in Maizuru, Kyoto, Japan) is a Japanese professional wrestler currently working for Active Advance Pro Wrestling (2AW). His style is a combination of submission wrestling and hard martial arts style strikes.

== Professional wrestling career ==
=== Kaientai Dojo/Active Advance Pro Wrestling (2001-present) ===
Kengo Mashimo debuted in Puerto Rico in 2001 as one of the first Kaientai Dojo (K-Dojo)'s students. Once Kaientai Dojo arrived in Japan in April 2002, Mashimo started as a wrestler using a grappling and shoot style, finishing his opponents quickly by KO or TKO before starting a short series of matches with Isami which Mashimo lost 3-1, but in doing so, won a lot of crowd support for his fire and spirit. Mashimo did not affiliate with any units in the early years, instead choosing to fight anyone. 2003 also saw Mashimo have his biggest match in his career since debuting as a wrestler, taking on NJPW junior legend Jyushin Thunder Liger in an impressive match which opened eyes to him. He also travelled to some other promotions that year, including Riki Choshu's World Japan. In 2004, he allied with Kunio Toshima and SUPER-X but never officially making a faction. Toshima & Mashimo won the UWA and UWF Intercontinental tag team titles, but vacated them after winning due to winning them in a Handicap match in the tournament final as Hi69's partner, MIYAWAKI was injured earlier in the night. Mashimo also got the biggest chance of his career, challenging Heat for the IWGP Junior Heavyweight Championship. He also made it to the STRONGEST-K '04 finals that year after dispatching of Taka Michinoku in the semifinals. However, Mashimo was defeated by Hi69 in the finals at Tokyo's Korakuen Hall.

In 2005, under the guidance of former Far East Connection manager, 296, Kengo Mashimo formed a stable along with KAZMA called Kinnoutou and Kinnoutou started to dominate, eventually taking in Ryota Chikuzen and Kunio Toshima as well. Mashimo and KAZMA though were the most successful of the group, Mashimo going undefeated from the formation of Kinnoutou and did not drop a fall until well after he left the group. Kengo Mashimo and KAZMA won the first Strongest-K Tag Team tournament and were crowned the first ever Strongest-K Tag Team Champions, the two dominating the tag team scene in K-DOJO as they also won the UWA and UWF Intercontinental Tag Team titles, absorbing them into the STRONGEST-K Tag Team title. When K-DOJO split its roster into two, Mashimo, along with the rest of his Kinnoutou allies were drafted to GET. Mashimo's singles dominance was also highlighted with winning the STRONGEST-K '05 tournament, defeating Yuji Hino in one of the longest singles matches in K-DOJO history.

Early 2006, saw Mashimo and KAZMA lose their first ever tag match together, losing the STRONGEST-K Tag Team title in February to Makoto Oishi and Shiori Asahi. After losing, signs of friction started to grow in Kinnoutou with Kunio Toshima's sense of justice saving TAKU Michinoku from a Kinnoutou attack. Mashimo and Toshima battled each other until Mashimo defeated Toshima in April. Mashimo resumed his quest to become the ace of K-DOJO and became the first man to win the STRONGEST-K tournament twice by defeating Saburo Inematsu in the final and after his win, he left Kinnoutou and jumped to RAVE where he was a lone wolf after rejecting attempts from New Standard, Kashiwa Gumi and the Boso Heroes. Finally, after two years of chasing, Mashimo finally gained K-DOJO's Strongest-K Championship title by defeating the popular JOE and became the ace of the company. After joining RAVE and winning the Strongest-K Championship, Mashimo started a rival partnership with the newly unmasked Madoka. Mashimo also appeared regularly on Big Mouth Loud and later Uwai Station shows.

Mashimo and Madoka fought for Mashimo's title at the January Korakuen show, but resumed their partnership after, the two winning the 2007 STRONGEST-K Tag Team Tournament and followed it by winning in the GPWA sponsored Differ Cup tournament. Mashimo's Kinnoutou past was brought back to him, defeating his ex-partner KAZMA in the main event for the 5th Anniversary show in April, then taking on Ryota Chikuzen for his title a few months later. Once GET and RAVE merged, Mashimo kept his partnership with Madoka and brought Boso Boy Raito into their alliance, however never officially becoming a group. Mashimo began a short feud with TAKA Michinoku, Mashimo forcing TAKA to prove himself after an average two years, which led to a title match on TAKA's 15 Anniversary show which Mashimo won. 2007 has also seen Mashimo start an interpromotional rivalry with BJW heavyweight Daisuke Sekimoto, the two fighting on nearly every Indy Summit show, culmulating in a BJW Tag Team Championship title match with Mashimo teaming with DDT star HARASHIMA in a 30-minute draw against champions Sekimoto and Pro Wrestling ZERO1-MAX's Yoshihito Sasaki.

=== New Japan Pro Wrestling (2012-2013) ===
On September 7, 2012, Mashimo began working for New Japan Pro-Wrestling, joining the Suzuki-gun stable, which also included his trainer Taka Michinoku. Mashimo's first big match in New Japan took place on September 23 at Destruction, where he was defeated by Togi Makabe in a singles match. On November 15, Mashimo entered a tournament to determine the inaugural NEVER Openweight Champion. After wins over Bushi and Ryusuke Taguchi, Mashimo was eliminated from the tournament in the semifinals on November 19 by Karl Anderson. From November 20 to December 1, Mashimo took part in the round-robin portion of the 2012 World Tag League, alongside Suzuki-gun leader Minoru Suzuki. The team finished with a record of three wins and three losses, failing to advance from their block. In February 2013, Mashimo took part in Suzuki-gun's war with the Chaos stable, which built to a singles match on February 10 at The New Beginning, where he was defeated by Shinsuke Nakamura.

=== All Japan Pro Wrestling (2014-2017) ===
In early 2014, Mashimo began working regularly for All Japan Pro Wrestling (AJPW) as a member of Kenso's Dark Kingdom stable. However, on August 30, Mashimo turned on Kenso and his stable. On May 21, 2017, Mashimo won his first title in AJPW, when he and Kai defeated Bodyguard and Zeus for the World Tag Team Championship. They lost the title back to Bodyguard and Zeus on June 11.

== Championships and accomplishments ==
- Active Advance Pro Wrestling
  - 2AW Openweight Championship (1 time)
  - 2AW Tag Team Championship (4 times) – with Tatsuya Hanami (2), Naka Shuma (1) and Kyu Mogami (1)
- All Japan Pro Wrestling
  - World Tag Team Championship (2 times) – with Kai (1) and Hideki Suzuki (1)
- Big Japan Pro Wrestling
  - BJW World Tag Team Championship (1 time) – with Madoka
- Global Professional Wrestling Alliance
  - Differ Cup Tag Team tournament (2007) – with Madoka
- Kaientai Dojo
  - Chiba Six Man Tag Team Championship (1 time) – with Isami Kodaka and Taka Michinoku
  - Kitakami 6-Man Tag Team Championship (1 time) – with Tank Nagai and Yuki Sato
  - Strongest-K Championship (6 times)
  - Strongest-K Tag Team Championship (8 times) – with Kazma/Kazma Sakamoto (2), Madoka (1), Daigoro Kashiwa (1), Hiroki (1), Taka Michinoku (1), Ryuichi Sekine (1), and Yuki Sato (1)
  - UWA/UWF Intercontinental Tag Team Championship (2 times) – with Kazma (1) and Kunio Toshima (1)
  - WEW Hardcore Tag Team Championship (3 times) – with Ryuichi Sekine (2) and Yoshiya (1)
  - Kaio Tournament (2013, 2014)
  - Kaientai Dojo Tag League – with Kunio Toshima (2004), Madoka (2007 and 2008), Ryuichi Sekine (2011), and Taka Michinoku (2012)
  - K-Survivor Tournament (2003) – with SUPER-X, Miyawaki, Kunio Toshima, Mike Lee, Jr. and Yuu Yamagata
  - K-Survivor Tournament (2015) – with Tank Nagai, Yuki Sato and Yuma
  - Strongest-K Get (2005)
  - Strongest-K Tournament (2005, 2006, 2008)
  - Strongest-K Tag Team Tournament (2005) – with Kazma
  - Singles Match of the Year (2006) vs. Joe on October 9
  - Singles Match of the Year (2007) vs. Taka Michinoku on September 4
  - Singles Match of the Year (2008) vs. Yuji Hino on August 9
  - Singles Match of the Year (2011) vs. Yuji Hino on June 18
  - Singles Match of the Year (2013) vs. Yuji Hino on July 15
  - Singles Match of the Year (2014) vs. Hiro Tonai on November 3
  - Singles Match of the Year (2015) vs. Yuji Hino on February 22
  - Singles Match of the Year (2016) vs. Tank Nagai on November 6
  - Tag Team Match of the Year (2004) with Kunio Toshima vs. Heat and Ryusuke Taguchi on September 11
  - Tag Team Match of the Year (2005) with Kazma vs. Apple Miyuki and Yoshiya on October 9
  - Tag Team Match of the Year (2006) with Madoka vs. Joe and Yasu Urano on December 10
  - Tag Team Match of the Year (2010) with Hiroki vs. Kaji Tomato and Taishi Takizawa on August 15
  - Tag Team Match of the Year (2012) with Ryuichi Sekine vs. Hiro Tonai and Shiori Asahi on July 8
  - Tag Team Match of the Year (2013) with Kazma Sakamoto vs. Kaji Tomato and Taka Michinoku on November 10
  - Tag Team Match of the Year (2015) with Yuki Sato vs. Kotaro Yoshino and Taishi Takizawa
  - Tag Team of the Year (2011) – with Ryuichi Sekine
  - Wrestler of the Year (2006-2008, 2011, 2013-2014)
- Toshikoshi Puroresu
  - Forget The Year! Shuffle Six Man Tag Tournament (2021) – with Harashima and Daichi Hashimoto
- Kyushu Pro-Wrestling
  - Kyushu Pro-Wrestling Championship (1 time)
- Pro-Wrestling Basara
  - Iron Fist Tag Team Championship (1 time) – with Ayumu Honda
- Pro Wrestling Illustrated
  - PWI ranked him #228 of the top 500 singles wrestlers in the PWI 500 in 2017
- Pro Wrestling Zero1
  - Zero1 Intercontinental Tag Team Championship (1 time) – with Naka Shuma
  - NWA United National Heavyweight Championship (1 time)
- Strong Style Pro-Wrestling
  - Legend Championship (1 time)
