= Active Advance Pro Wrestling Openweight Championship =

Professional wrestling world championship

2AW Openweight Championship
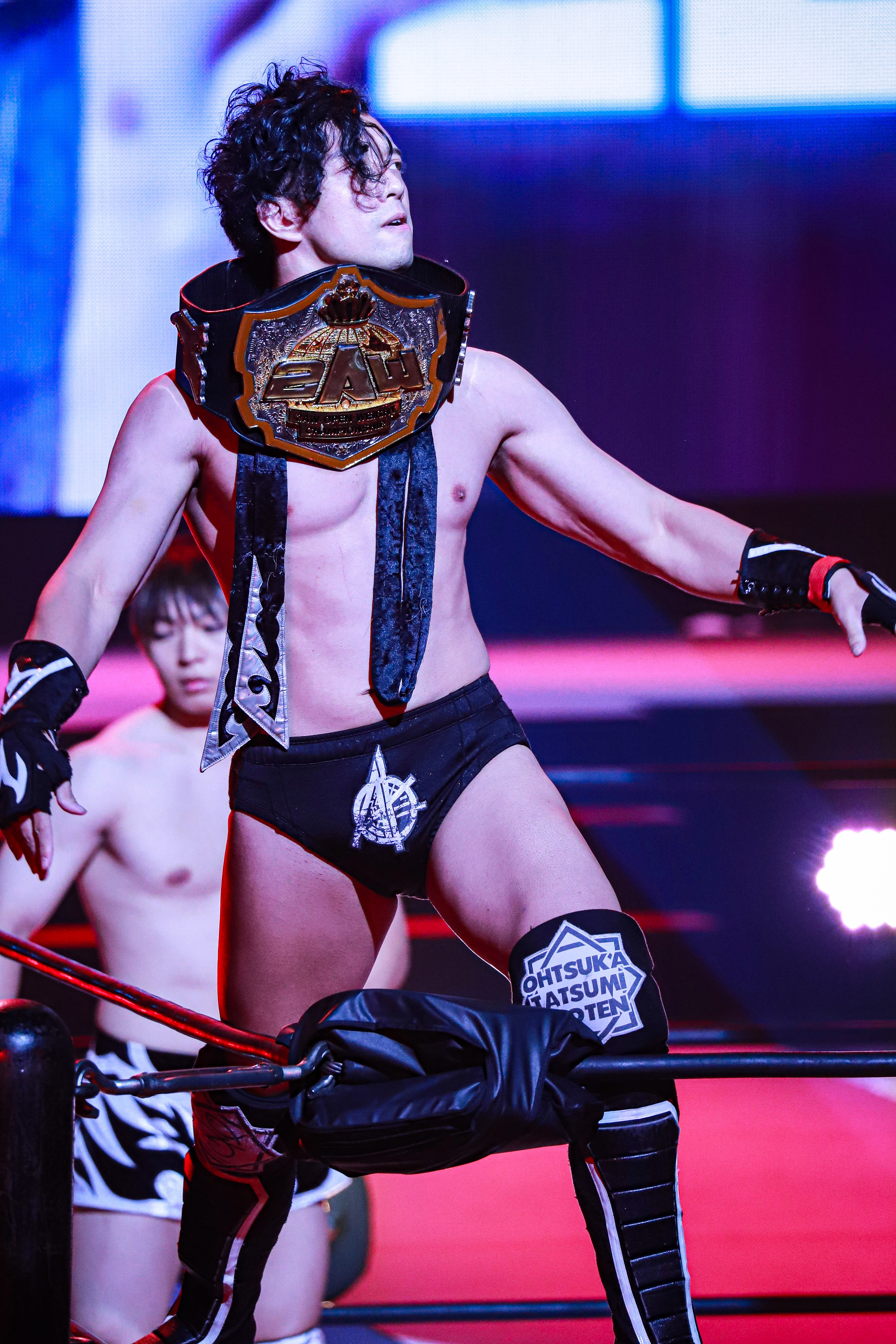
- Ayato Yoshida with the current design of the title (2022–present)

Details
- Promotion: Active Advance Pro Wrestling
- Date established: September 1, 2019
- Current champion: Taishi Takizawa
- Date won: June 21, 2026
Statistics
- First champion: Shu Asakawa
- Most reigns: Ayato Yoshida (4 reigns)
- Longest reign: Ayato Yoshida (298 days)
- Shortest reign: Naka Shuma (56 days)
- Oldest champion: Kohei Sato (45 years, 305 days)
- Youngest champion: Takuro Niki (23 years, 0 days)
- Heaviest champion: Yuji Okabayashi (264 lb)
- Lightest champion: Takuro Niki (185 lb)

The 2AW Openweight Championship is a professional wrestling world championship created and promoted by the Japanese promotion Active Advance Pro Wrestling, being sanctioned as the promotion's top championship. There have been a total of thirteen reigns shared between ten different champions. The current champion is Daiju Wakamatsu who is in his first reign.

== Title history ==
In April 2019, the promotion (previously named Kaientai Dojo) announced that they were rebranding as Active Advance Pro Wrestling (2AW). This came as the company attempted to rebrand itself after the Taka Michinoku scandal, also changing its colors to black and white. That same night, young wrestler Ayato Yoshida won the Strongest-K Championship, symbolically leading the company into the future. He retired the title as the new 2AW Openweight Championship was created to replace it.

There have been a total of sixteen reigns shared between ten different champions. Shu Asakawa was the inaugural champion. Ayato Yoshida holds the record for the longest reign with 298 days and also for the most individual reigns with four and also for the most cumulated successful defenses with twelve. The current champion is Taishi Takizawa, who won the title by defeating Ayato Yoshida at 2AW 7th Anniversary on June 21, 2026, in Chiba, Japan.

Key
No.	Overall reign number
Reign	Reign number for the specific champion
Days	Number of days held
Defenses	Number of successful defenses
<1	Reign lasted less than a day
+	Current reign is changing daily

No.	Champion	Championship change			Reign statistics			Notes	Ref.
No.	Champion	Date	Event	Location	Reign	Days	Defenses	Notes	Ref.
1	Shu Asakawa	September 1, 2019	2AW GRAND SLAM In Korakuen Hall	Tokyo, Japan	1	206	4	Defeated Ayato Yoshida in the tournament final to become the inaugural champion.	
2	Yuji Okabayashi	March 25, 2020	2AW GRAND SLAM In Korakuen Hall	Tokyo, Japan	1	102	2		
3	Ayato Yoshida	July 5, 2020	2AW Launching Business 1st Anniversary ~ GRAND SLAM In TKP Garden City Chiba	Chiba, Japan	1	298	6		
4	Taishi Takizawa	April 29, 2021	2AW Grand Slam In 2AW Square	Chiba, Japan	1	182	4		
5	Shigehiro Irie	October 28, 2021	2AW Grand Slam In Korakuen Hall	Tokyo, Japan	1	144	3		
6	Kengo Mashimo	March 21, 2022	2AW Grand Slam In Korakuen Hall	Tokyo, Japan	1	279	7		
7	Ayato Yoshida	December 25, 2022	2AW Grand Slam in TKP Garden City Chiba ~ Final Event Of The Year	Tokyo, Japan	2	210	6		
8	Kohei Sato	July 23, 2023	2AW Grand Slam in TKP Garden City Chiba	Tokyo, Japan	1	98	1		
9	Takuro Niki	October 29, 2023	2AW Grand Slam In TKP Garden City Chiba	Chiba, Japan	1	238	6		
10	Taishi Takizawa	June 23, 2024	2AW 5th Anniversary	Chiba, Japan	2	63	1		
11	Ayato Yoshida	August 25, 2024	2AW Grand Slam In TKP Garden City Chiba	Chiba, Japan	3	245	5		
12	Naka Shuma	April 27, 2025	2AW Grand Slam In TKP Garden City Chiba	Chiba, Japan	1	56	0		
13	Daiju Wakamatsu	June 22, 2025	2AW 6th Anniversary Grand Slam In TKP Garden City Chiba	Chiba, Japan	1	112	4		
14	Takuro Niki	October 12, 2025	2AW Grand Slam In Korakuen Hall	Tokyo, Japan	2	168	3		
15	Ayato Yoshida	March 29, 2026	2AW Grand Slam In Korakuen Hall	Tokyo, Japan	4	84	2		
16	Taishi Takizawa	June 21, 2026	2AW 7th Anniversary	Chiba, Japan	3	114+	3		

=== Combined reigns ===
As of October 13, 2026.

†	Indicates the current champion

Rank	Wrestler	No. of reigns	Combined defenses	Combined days
1	Ayato Yoshida	4	19	837
2	Takuro Niki	2	9	406
3	Taishi Takizawa †	3	8	359+
4	Kengo Mashimo	1	7	279
5	Shu Asakawa	1	4	206
6	Shigehiro Irie	1	3	144
7	Daiju Wakamatsu	1	4	112
8	Yuji Okabayashi	1	2	102
9	Kohei Sato	1	1	98
10	Naka Shuma	1	0	56
