= Tank Nagai =

Japanese professional wrestler

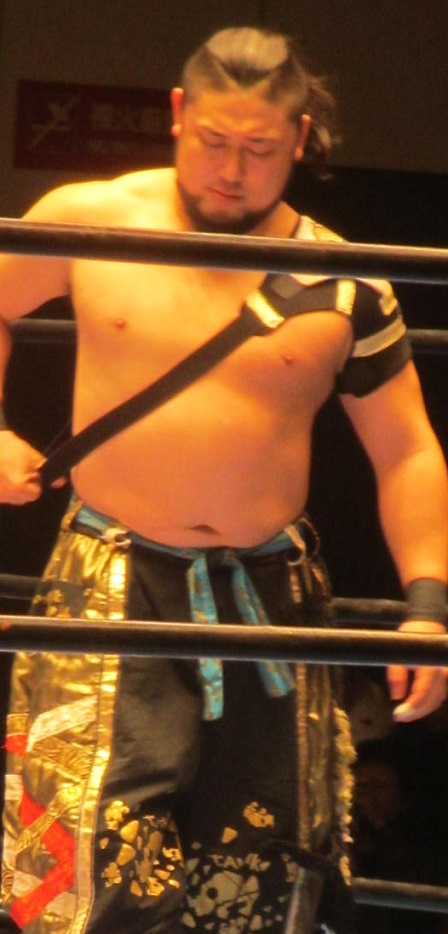
- Nagai in December 2016

Personal information
- Born: April 28, 1984 (age 42) Chiba, Japan
- Spouse: Mio Shirai (m. 2015)

Professional wrestling career
- Ring name: Tank Nagai
- Billed height: 175 cm (5 ft 9 in)
- Billed weight: 100 kg (220 lb)
- Debut: 2012
- Retired: 2022

Tank Nagai (タンク・ナガイ, Tanku Nagai) is a Japanese retired professional wrestler best known for his tenure with the Japanese promotions Kaientai Dojo and All Japan Pro Wrestling.

== Professional wrestling career ==
=== Independent circuit (2012-2022) ===
Nagai is known for competing in multiple promotions of the Japanese independent scene. At Koji Doi & Kumagoro Produce New Year Fighting Festival, an event promoted by Wrestle-1 on January 25, 2017, Nagai teamed up with his "Magatsuki" tag partner Yuki Sato to defeat Seigo Tachibana and Shotaro Ashino. At TAKA & Taichi Produce TAKATaichi House In Yokohama, an independent event produced by Taka Michinoku and Taichi on December 22, 2018, Nagai competed in a 16-person battle royal won by Saori Anou and also involving Ayame Sasamura, Natsumi Maki, Rina Shingaki, Tomoaki Honma, Yoshinobu Kanemaru and others. At BASARA 182 ~ Koo ~, an event promoted by Pro-Wrestling Basara on January 25, 2022, he went into a time-limit draw against Isami Kodaka.

Nagai often competed in joshi promotions as a guest. He wrestled in various matches for Ice Ribbon, the last of them taking place at New Ice Ribbon #1026 ~ RE:BORN on February 24, 2020, where he teamed up with Hamuko Hoshi to unsuccessfully face Hiragi Kurumi and Minoru Tanaka, and Orca Uto and Risa Sera in a three-way intergender tag team match. At WAVE Sunday WAVE Vol. 38, an event promoted by Pro Wrestling Wave on June 28, 2020, he faced Hiragi Kurumi and Sakura Hirota in two three-way matches on the same night with Kurumi being the winner in the both bouts.

=== All Japan Pro Wrestling (2014-2019) ===
Another promotion in which Nagai competed is All Japan Pro Wrestling. He made his first appearance at AJPW Chiba Extra Dream on March 16, 2014, where he teamed up with Kaji Tomato to defeat Menso-re Oyaji and Sushi. He is known for participating in various of the promotion's signature events. One of them is the World's Strongest Tag Determination League, making his first appearance at the 2014 edition where he teamed up with Kengo Mashimo and scored a total of four points after going against the teams of Kento Miyahara and Go Shiozaki, Jun Akiyama and Takao Omori, Akebono and Yutaka Yoshie, Joe Doering and Suwama, The Bodyguard and Zeus, Atsushi Aoki and Hikaru Sato, and Kenso and Mitsuya Nagai. He marked his last appearance at the 2016 edition of the event where he teamed up with Kenho Mashimo again, placing themselves in the Block A and scoring a total of six points after going against the teams of Jake Lee and Kento Miyahara, Atsushi Aoki and Suwam, Osamu Nishimura and Yutaka Yoshie, Rikiya Fudo and Ryoji Sai, and Black Tiger VII and Mitsuya Nagai.

=== Kaientai Dojo/Active Advance Pro Wrestling (2012-2022) ===
The promotion for which Nagai is best known for competing in for a decade until his retirement was Kaientai Dojo (became Active Advance Pro Wrestling in 2019). He made his professional wrestling debut at Taka Michinoku's 20th Anniversary on October 14, 2012, where he fell short to Ayumu Honda. At FREEDOMS/2AW VersuS, an event produced in partnership with Pro Wrestling Freedoms on February 21, 2021, Nagai teamed up with his "Toll Glänz" tag partner Ayato Yoshida to defeat Jun Kasai and Kenji Fukimoto.

==== Big Japan Pro Wrestling (2012-2022) ====
Kaientai Dojo has held numerous events in partnership with Big Japan Pro Wrestling, shows in which Nagai has also competed. At BJW/ZERO1/2AW 3 Groups Joint Performance ~ Tokyo Delta, an event produced also in partnership with Pro Wrestling Zero1 on August 11, 2020, Nagai teamed up with Towa Iwasaki and Takuya Nomura in a losing effort against Ayato Yoshida, Daisuke Sekimoto and Masato Tanaka as a result of a six-man tag team match. His last match in this kind of events occurred on January 16, 2022, at BJW/2AW Big Advance where he teamed up with Kotaro Yoshino to defeat Hideyoshi Kamitani and Kazuki Hashimoto.

== Personal life ==
In September 2015, Mio Shirai announced she was getting married the following month. Shirai later revealed her fiancé being Nagai. The wedding ceremony took place on October 16, 2015. On December 31, 2016, Shirai announced she was pregnant with the couple's first child. She gave birth on June 18, 2017.

== Championships and accomplishments ==
- Active Advance Pro Wrestling/Kaientai Dojo
  - 2AW Tag Team Championship (2 times) – with Ayato Yoshida (1) and Kotaro Yoshino (1)
  - Chiba Six Man Tag Team Championship (2 times) – with Ayato Yoshida and Tatsuya Hanami (1) and Ayato Yoshida and Kotaro Yoshino (1)
  - Strongest-K Championship (2 times)
  - Strongest-K Tag Team Championship (3 times) – with Yuki Sato (1), Isami Kodaka (1) and Ayato Yoshida (1)
  - Kaioh Tournament (2015, 2016)
  - K-Survivor Tournament (2015)
