= Ayato Yoshida =

Japanese professional wrestler

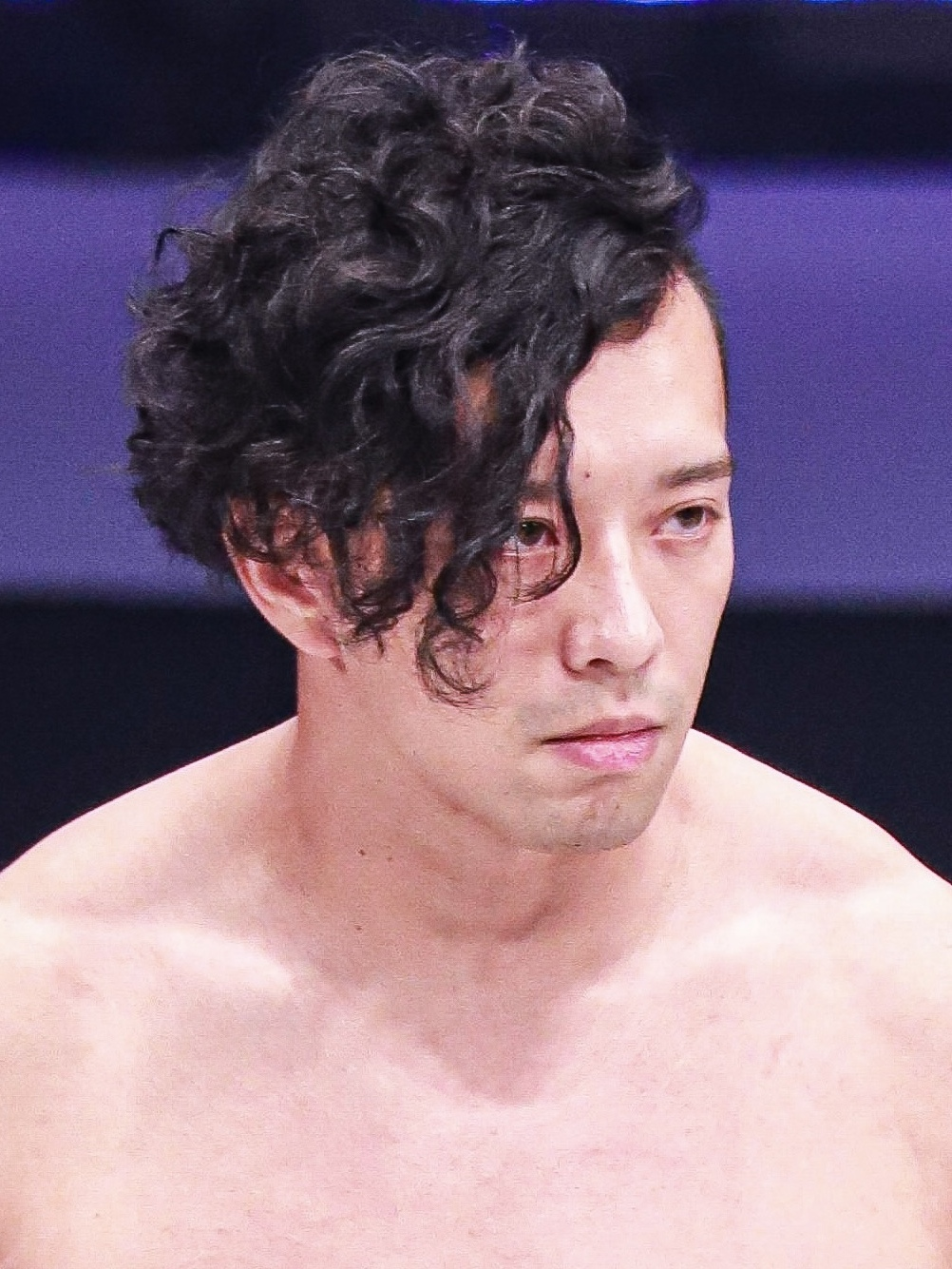
- Yoshida in July 2023

Personal information
- Born: September 27, 1992 (age 34) Osaka, Japan

Professional wrestling career
- Ring name: Ayato Yoshida
- Billed height: 183 cm (6 ft 0 in)
- Billed weight: 90 kg (198 lb)
- Trained by: Taka Michinoku; Taishi Takizawa; Ayumu Honda; Hiro Tonai; Kotaro Yoshino
- Debut: 2015

Ayato Yoshida (吉田綾斗, Yoshida Ayato) is a Japanese professional wrestler currently working for the Japanese promotion Active Advance Pro Wrestling where he is the former four-time 2AW Openweight Champion.

== Professional wrestling career ==
=== Kaientai Dojo/Active Advance Pro Wrestling (2015-present) ===
Yoshida is best known for his time with Active Advance Pro Wrestling. He made his professional wrestling debut in the promotion before the Kaientai Dojo rebranding, on November 1, 2015, at K-DOJO Club-K Super In Korakuen, show where he teamed up with Dinosaur Takuma and defeated Go Asakawa and Kyu Mogami. Yoshida won many championships promoted by the company, the first of them being the Strongest-K Tag Team Championship which he won by teaming up with his Nex4 partner Kyu Mogami at Club-K Super In Korakuen Hall on November 6, 2016, after defeating Sekitoba (Kotaro Yoshino and Taishi Takizawa). Yoshida has been the last Strongest-K Champion and has won it short before the promotion would fold and rebrand as "Active Advance Pro Wrestling".

After the promotion's rebranding in late 2019, Yoshida succeeded in winning the top championships, the 2AW Tag Team Championship which he held on multiple occasions with different partners of his new stable "The Rule", and the 2AW Openweight Championship which he first won on July 5, 2020, at 2AW Launching Business 1st Anniversary ~ GRAND SLAM In TKP Garden City Chiba.

=== New Japan Pro Wrestling (2016-2019) ===
Yoshida is known for his brief time with New Japan Pro Wrestling. He made his debut in the company as a "young lion" (the term used by NJPW as a reference to their rookie wrestlers) at Lion's Gate Project 2 on May 19, 2016, where he fell short to Hitoshi Kumano. He continued to compete in other events from under the Lion's Gate Project flagship. At Project 3 on September 1, 2016, he fell short to Juice Robinson, At Project 4 on April 13, 2017, where he teamed up with Dinosaur Takuma in a losing effort against Tencozy (Hiroyoshi Tenzan and Satoshi Kojima). At Project 5 on May 9, 2017, he fell short to Kojima in a singles match. At Project 6 on June 15, 2017, he teamed up with Kojima to defeat Tomoyuki Oka and Yuji Nagata in a tag team match. At Project 11 on April 10, 2018, he teamed up with Go Asakawa and defeated Yuji Nagata and Shota Umino. At Project 12 on May 15, 2018, Yoshida fell short to Yuji Nagata. At Project 13, the last event of its kind which took place on June 13, 2018, Yoshida picked up a victory over Shota Umino in the main event.

Yoshida competed in other various signature events if the company such as the NJPW World Tag League where he made his first appearance at the 2018 edition where he teamed up with Shota Umino and failed to score any points after competing against the teams of Guerrillas of Destiny (Tama Tonga and Tanga Loa), Los Ingobernables de Japón (Sanada and Evil), Tomohiro Ishii and Toru Yano, Killer Elite Squad (Lance Archer and Davey Boy Smith Jr.), Michael Elgin and Jeff Cobb, Suzuki-gun (Zack Sabre Jr.) and Taichi, Taguchi Japan (Juice Robinson and David Finlay), Best Friends (Beretta and Chuckie T., Minoru Suzuki and Takashi Iizuka, Hangman Page and Yujiro Takahashi, Hiroyoshi Tenzan and Satoshi Kojima, Togi Makabe and Toa Henare, and Yuji Nagata and Manabu Nakanishi.

Yoshida is also known to have participated in notable pay-per-view events hosted by NJPW. His first appearance in this kind of events took place at NJPW Destruction 2018, a three-night contest which started on September 15, where Yoshida teamed up with Michael Elgin and fell short to Killer Elite Squad (Lance Archer and Davey Boy Smith Jr.). On the second night from September 17, Yoshida defeated Takashi Iizuka by disqualification. At the last night of September 23, he teamed up with Taguchi Japan's members Togi Makabe, Tomoaki Honma and Ryusuke Taguchi in a losing effort against Tencozy (Hiroyoshi Tenzan and Satoshi Kojima), Yuji Nagata and Manabu Nakanishi. At The New Beginning In Osaka 2019 on February 11, Yoshida teamed up with Shota Umino in a losing effort against Los Ingobernables de Japón (Evil and Sanada). At NJPW 49th Anniversary Show on March 6, 2019, Yoshida teamed up with Ren Narita, Shota Umino, Togi Makabe and Toru Yano in a losing effort against Bullet Club (Bad Luck Fale, Chase Owens, Hikuleo, Tama Tonga and Tanga Loa).

=== All Japan Pro Wrestling (2016-present) ===
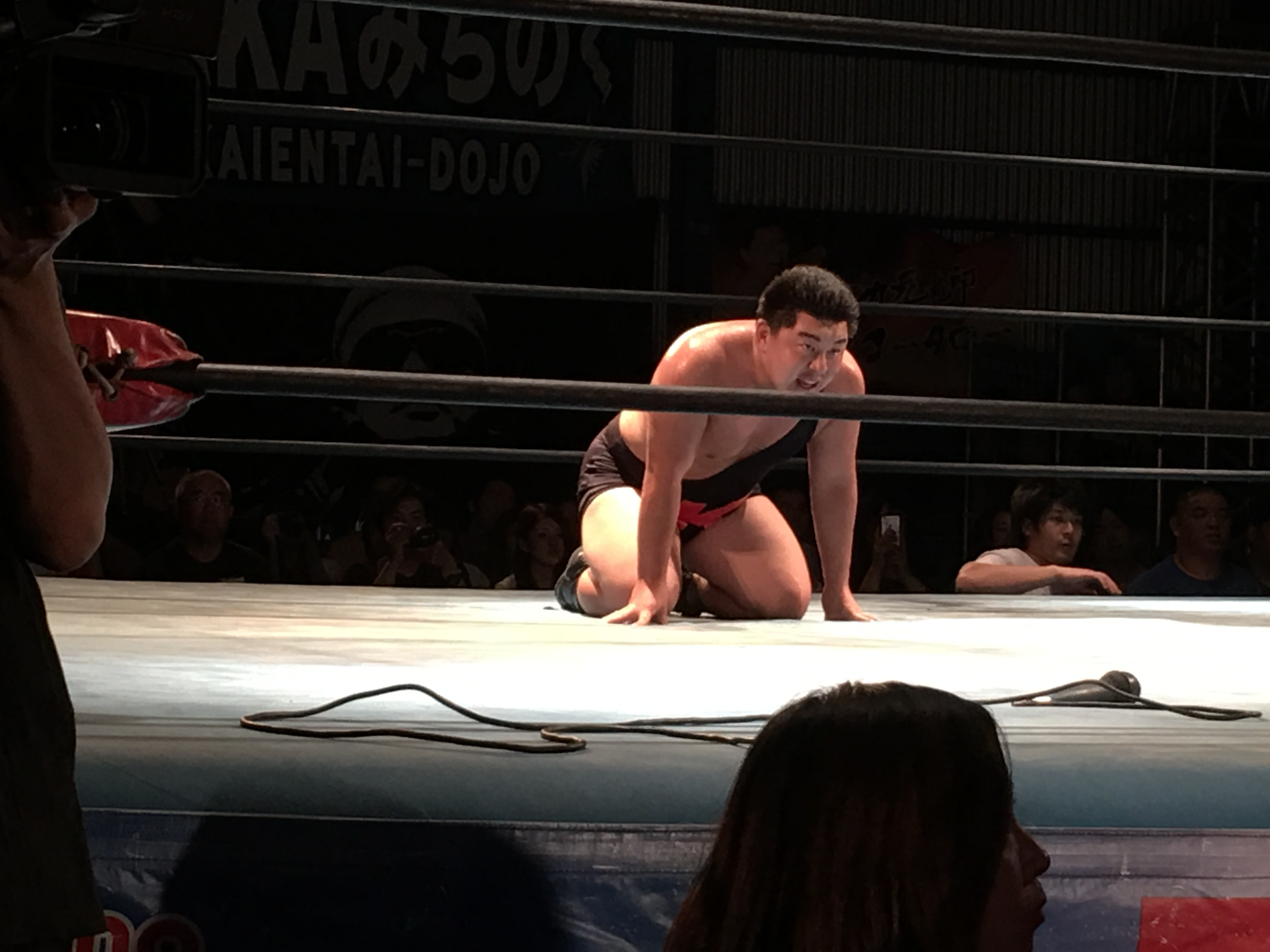
Yoshida in June 2016

Yoshida made his debut in AJPW at AJPW/BJW AJ Phoenix Vol. 3 on June 7, 2016, a cross-over event produced in partnership with Big Japan Pro Wrestling where he teamed up with Kazumi Kikuta and went into a time-limit draw against Koji Iwamoto and Yuma Aoyagi. He soon began competing in regular events such as the AJPW Chiba Extra Dream 11 from July 30, 2016, where he teamed up with his "Nex4" tag team partner Dinosaur Takuma and Kotaro Yoshino in a losing effort against Evolution (Atsushi Aoki, Hikaru Sato) and Rocky Kawamura. Yoshida competed in one of the promotion's signature events, the Ōdō Tournament, making his first appearance at the 2021 edition where he defeated Black Menso-re in the first rounds, Hokuto Omori in the second rounds, and fell short to Jake Lee in the quarterfinals.

== Championships and accomplishments ==
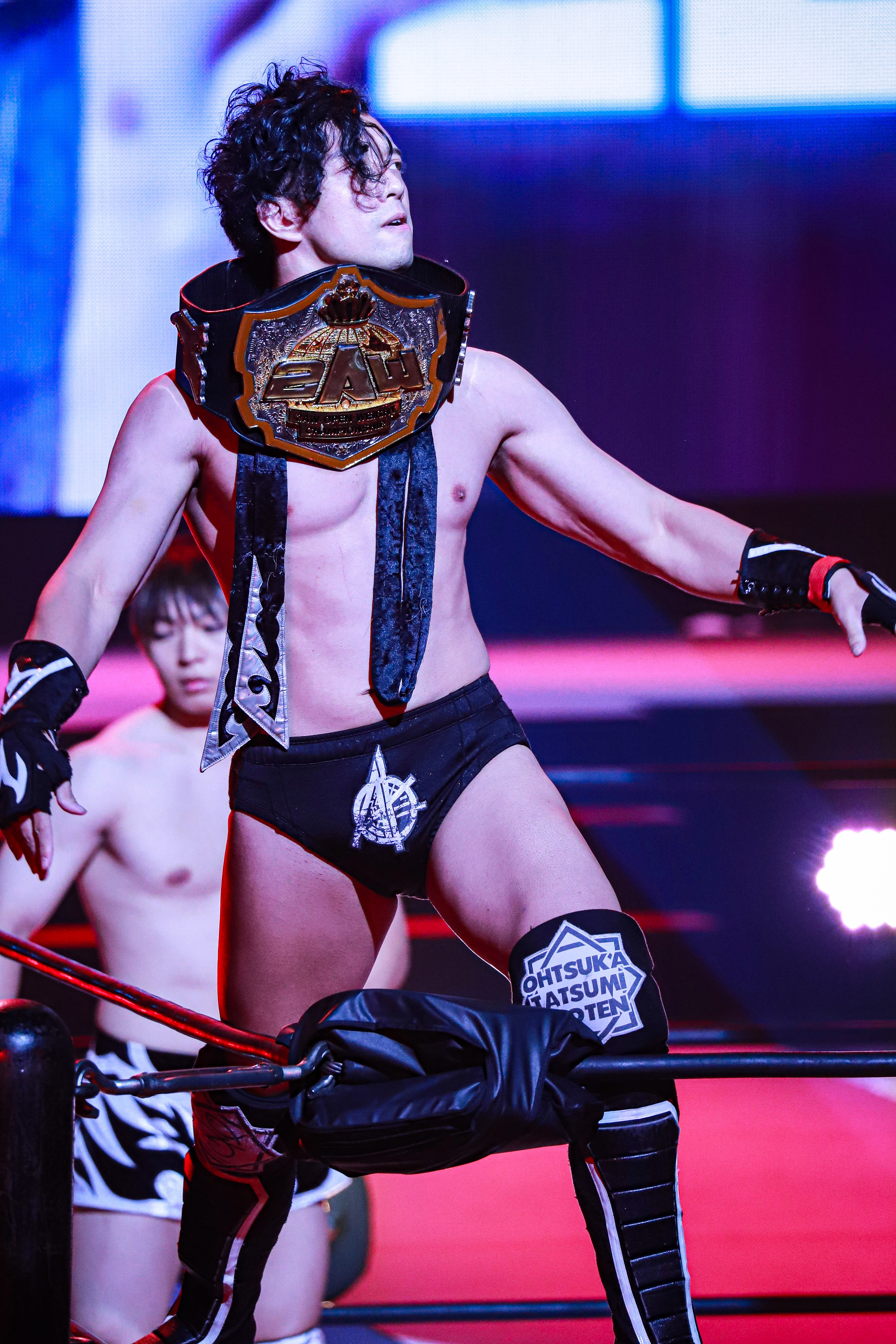
In Active Advance Pro Wrestling, Yoshida is a currently three-time 2AW Openweight Champion.

- Active Advance Pro Wrestling
  - 2AW Openweight Championship (4 times)
  - 2AW Tag Team Championship (4 times, inaugural, current) – with Tank Nagai (1), The Andrew King Takuma (1), Excilio (1) and Minoru Fujita (1)
  - Chiba Six Man Tag Team Championship (2 times) – with Kotaro Yoshino and Tank Nagai (1), and Tank Nagai and Tatsuya Hanami (1)
  - Active Advance Tournament (2022, 2024)
- Kaientai Dojo
  - Strongest-K Championship (1 time, final)
  - Strongest-K Tag Team Championship (2 times) – with Tank Nagai (1) and Kyu Mogami (1)
  - K-Metal League (2016)
  - Bo-So Golden Tag League (2017) – with Kyu Mogami
