= Active Advance Pro Wrestling =

Japanese professional wrestling promotion and training facility

- Acronym: 2AW
- Founded: 2002
- Style: Puroresu
- Headquarters: Chiba, Japan
- Founder: Taka Michinoku
- Formerly: Kaientai Dojo (K-DOJO)

Active Advance Pro Wrestling (2AW) is a Japanese professional wrestling promotion and training facility originally owned and promoted by Taka Michinoku. The promotion places emphasis on a style of puroresu that combines high-flying, technical wrestling, and martial arts. The promotion was originally called Kaientai Dojo (or K-DOJO for short).

This style was largely contributed to by Taka Michinoku and is gaining popularity in Japan and abroad. K-DOJO is also heavily influenced by American-style wrestling and places a large amount of importance on presentation. For instance, each Club-K 3000 show that K-DOJO runs is equipped with a large screen near the entrance gate, similar to the Titantron, where a short introductory vignette is played during each wrestler's entrance and where the crowd can follow the action on-screen.

They had a home building that doubles as their training facility, Chiba Blue Field, where all of their Club-K 3000 shows were held; in December 2011, the building was bought by the joshi pro-wrestling promotion Universal Woman's Pro Wrestling Reina, but K-Dojo continues to run shows from the renamed Reina Arena. On April 1, 2013, the arena was again renamed Blue Field, then in June 2019 it was renamed 2AW Square.

== History ==
Kaientai Dojo originated in 2000 as a small wrestling school in Puerto Rico run by Taka Michinoku. After Taka returned to Japan in 2002, he established the Japanese branch of Kaientai Dojo, which would soon become a wrestling promotion. The small federation grew over the years and is now an independent league that runs as a promotion, wrestling school, and talent loan organization to various other leagues such as AJPW, Dragon Gate and Michinoku Pro.

Until recently, K-DOJO was separated into two distinct sides, GET and RAVE, which ran separate shows but often joined during large shows and tours. GET was led by Taka Michinoku while RAVE's leader was Hi69. After Hi69's departure, Taka Michinoku became commissioner of RAVE, and 296 became commissioner of GET. On April 22, 2007, RAVE ran its last show; the two brands merged and now run joint shows.

A particular aspect of K-DOJO is that it is one of the few wrestling promotions to feature both men and women. Women can wrestle in the same ring as men, either during mixed tag matches or even singles matches. Also, they can challenge for championship belts, something that would be unheard of in most wrestling promotions.

In November 2018, it became known that Taka Michinoku had an eight-year-long extramarital relationship with a woman. After this scandal, the promotion fired him and sanctioned him for one year without payment.

In April 2019, the promotion announced that they were rebranding as Active Advance Pro Wrestling (2AW for short). This came as the company attempted to rebrand itself after the Taka Michinoku scandal, also changing its colors to black & white. That same night, young wrestler Ayato Yoshida won the Strongest-K Championship, symbolically leading the company into the future.

On January 10, 2020, it was announced that 2AW is now part of the Allied Independent Wrestling Federations as their Japanese affiliate.

== Championships ==
=== Current ===
Championship	Current champion(s)	Reign	Date won	Days held	Location	Notes
2AW Openweight Championship	Taishi Takizawa	3	June 21, 2026	129+	Chiba, Japan	Defeated Ayato Yoshida at 2AW 7th Anniversary.
2AW Tag Team Championship	Ayato Yoshida and Minoru Fujita	1 (4, 1)	October 12, 2026	16+	Tokyo, Japan	Defeated Ayumu Honda and Kengo at Grand Slam In Korakuen Hall.
Chiba Six Man Tag Team Championship	Vacant	N/A	2020	N/A	N/A	The titles have been inactive since late 2020 under unknown circumstances.

=== Formerly promoted ===
Championship	Last champion(s)	Reign	Date won	Location
AIWF World Heavyweight Championship	Kevin Phoenix	1	August 24, 2019	
Independent World Junior Heavyweight Championship	Arata	2	January 15, 2021	Tokyo, Japan
UWA World Middleweight Championship	Kyu Mogami	1	June 20, 2019	Tokyo, Japan
UWA World Tag Team Championship	Jinsei Shinzaki & The Great Sasuke	1 (1, 1)	May 4, 2021	Yahaba, Iwate, Japan
UWA/UWF Intercontinental Tag Team Championship	Kazma & Kengo Mashimo	1 (1, 1)	March 6, 2005	Chiba, Japan
FMW/WEW Hardcore Tag Team Championship	Kunio Toshima & Yuma Aoyagi	1 (1, 1)	April 17, 2016	Tokyo, Japan

=== Annual tournaments ===
Tournament	Latest winner:	Date won:
Bo-so Golden Tag Tournament	Ayato Yoshida & Kyu Mogami	January 29, 2017
K-Metal League	Marines Mask	May 6, 2018
Kaio Tournament	Kengo Mashimo	August 26, 2018

== See also ==
- Professional wrestling in Japan
- List of professional wrestling promotions in Japan
