= List of All Japan Pro Wrestling personnel =

This is a list of professional wrestlers who currently wrestle for All Japan Pro Wrestling, as well as a list of notable alumni. The current roster consists of the Home Unit (those under exclusive contract), freelancers, gaikokujin and several stables.

== Roster ==
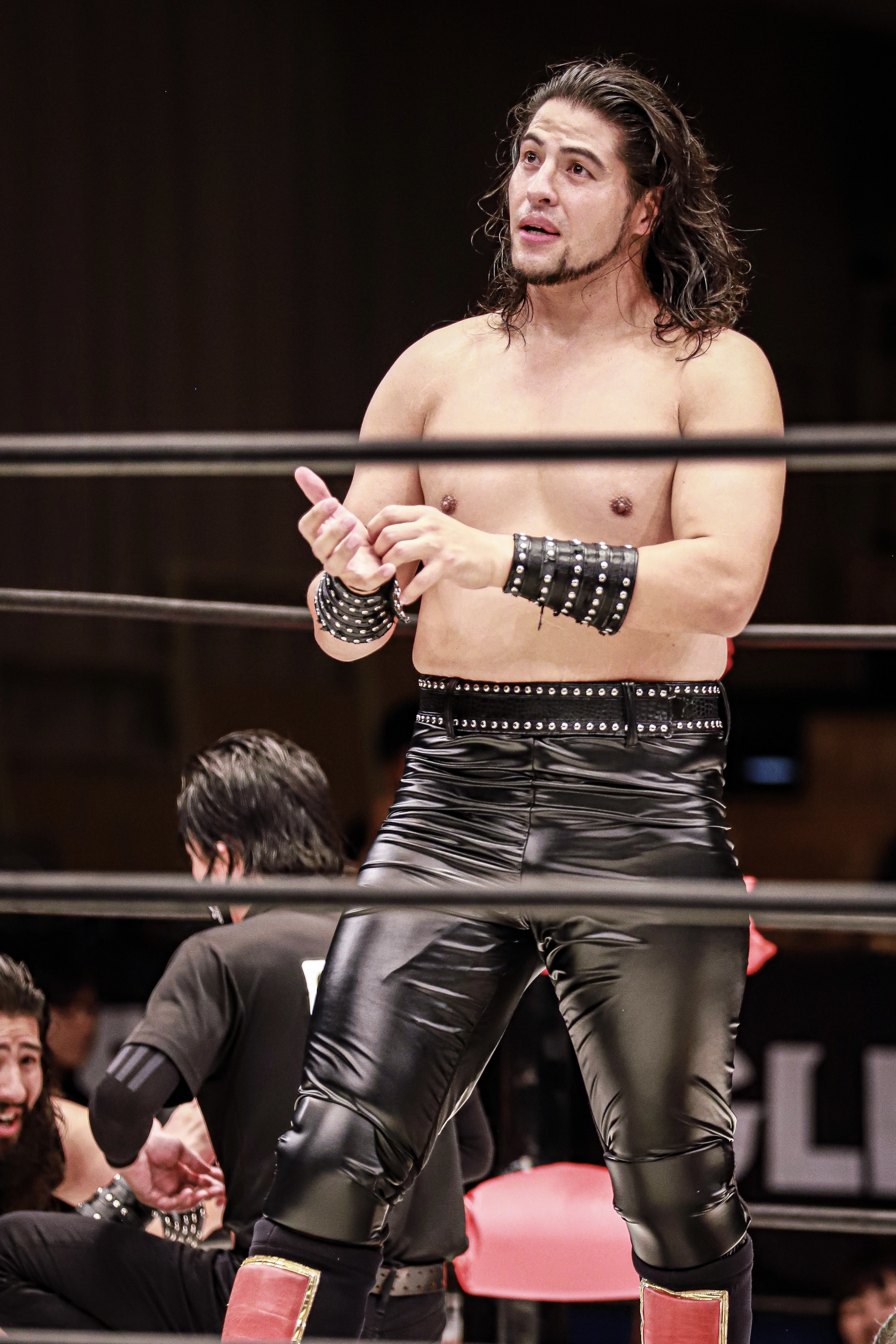
Jun Saito

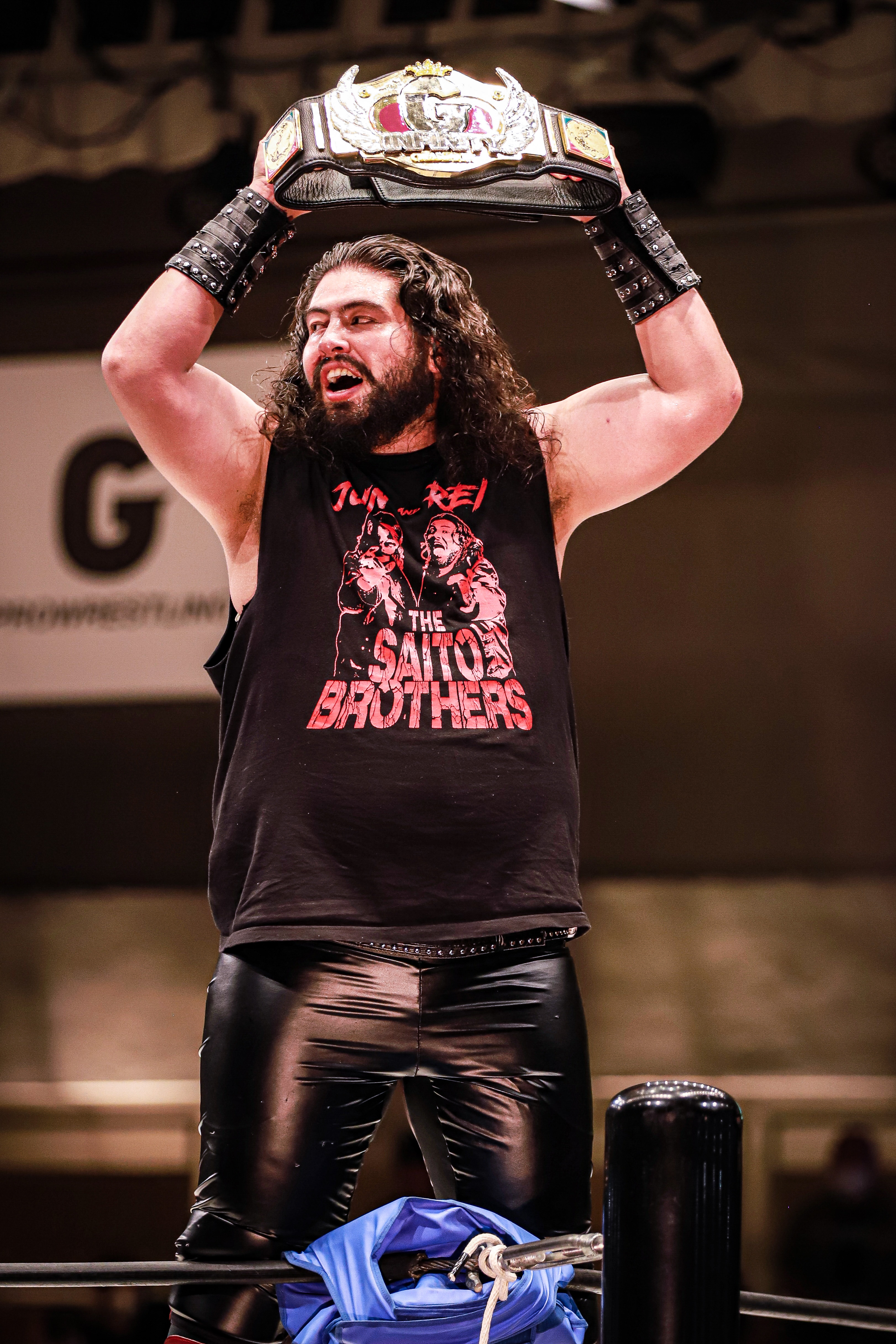
Rei Saito

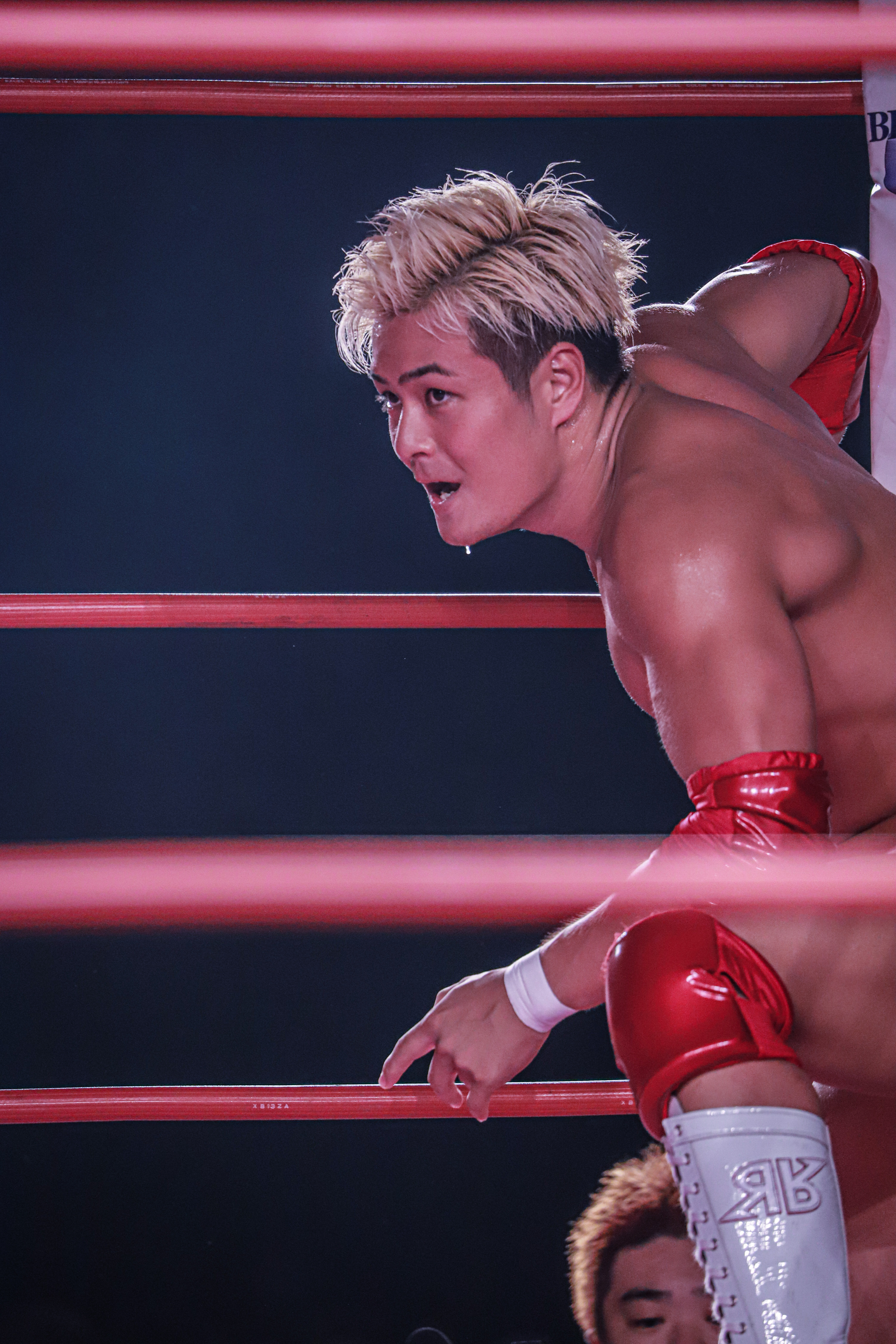
Rising Hayato

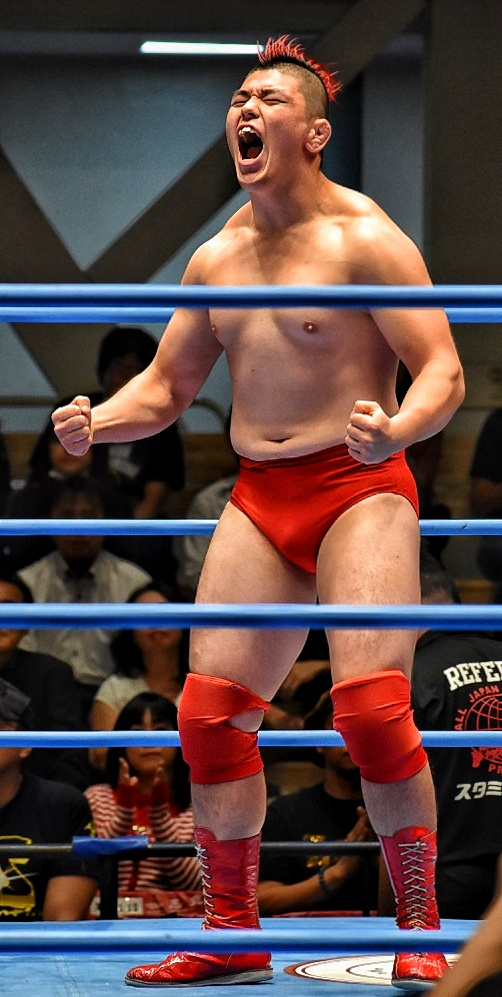
Dan Tamura

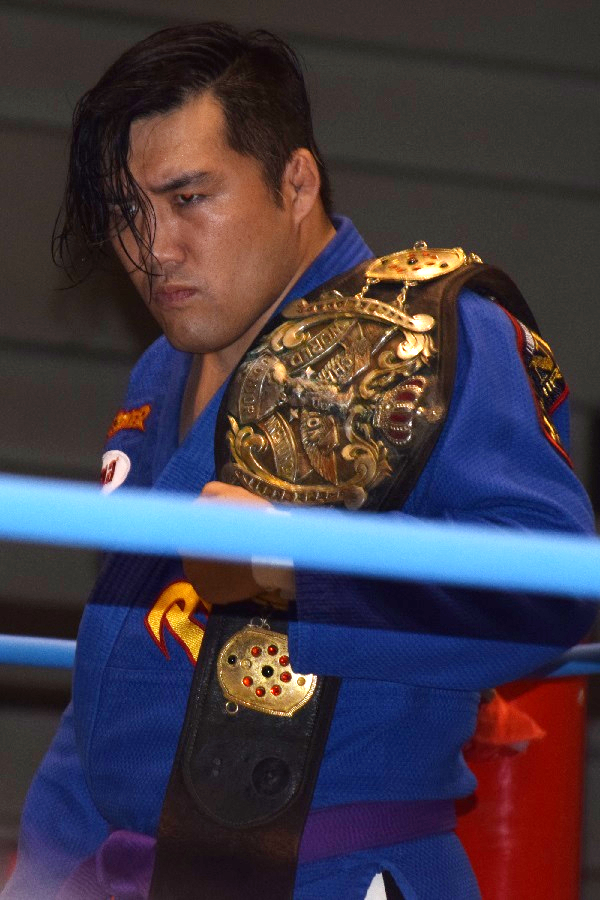
Hikaru Sato

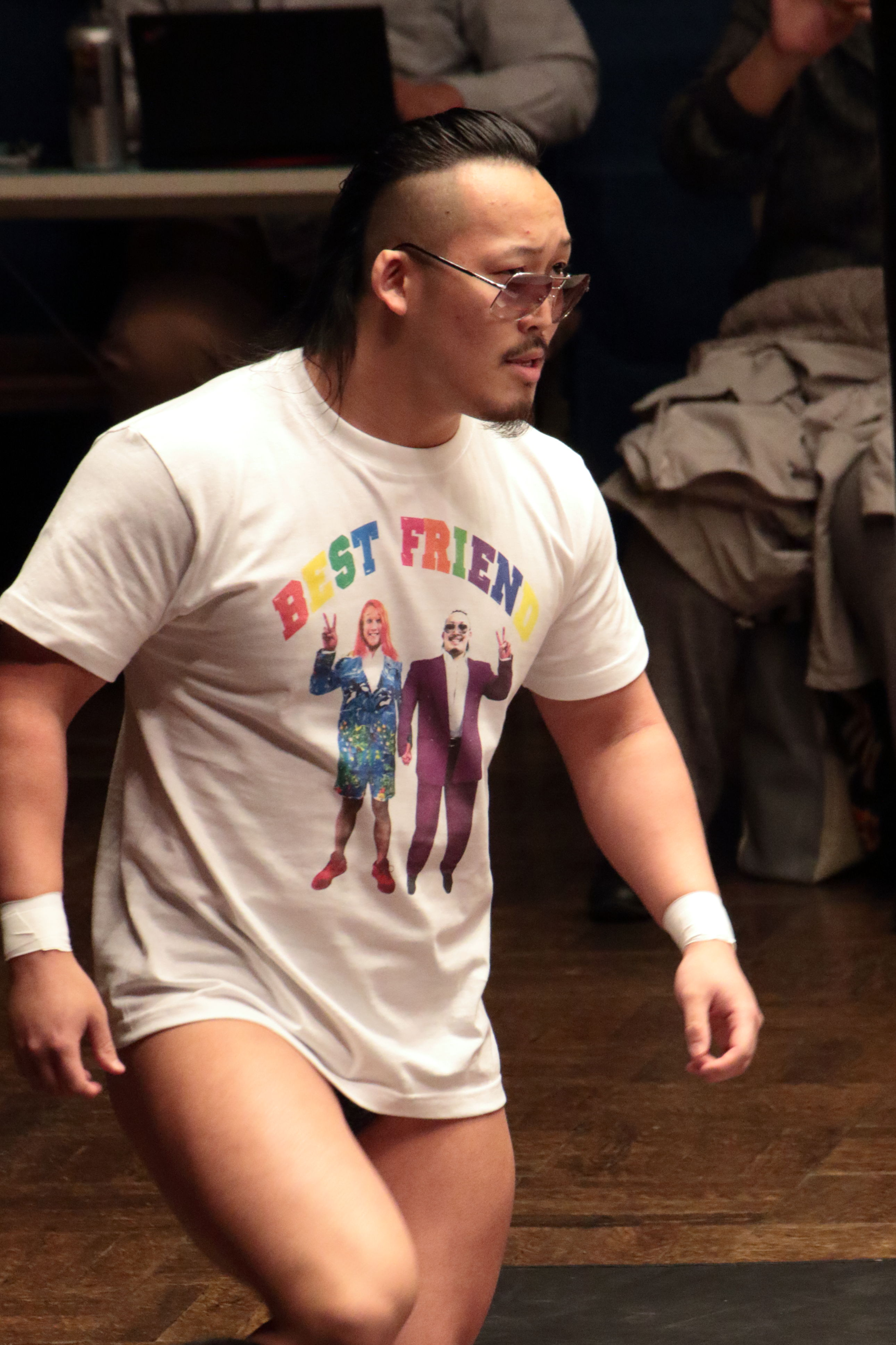
Seigo Tachibana

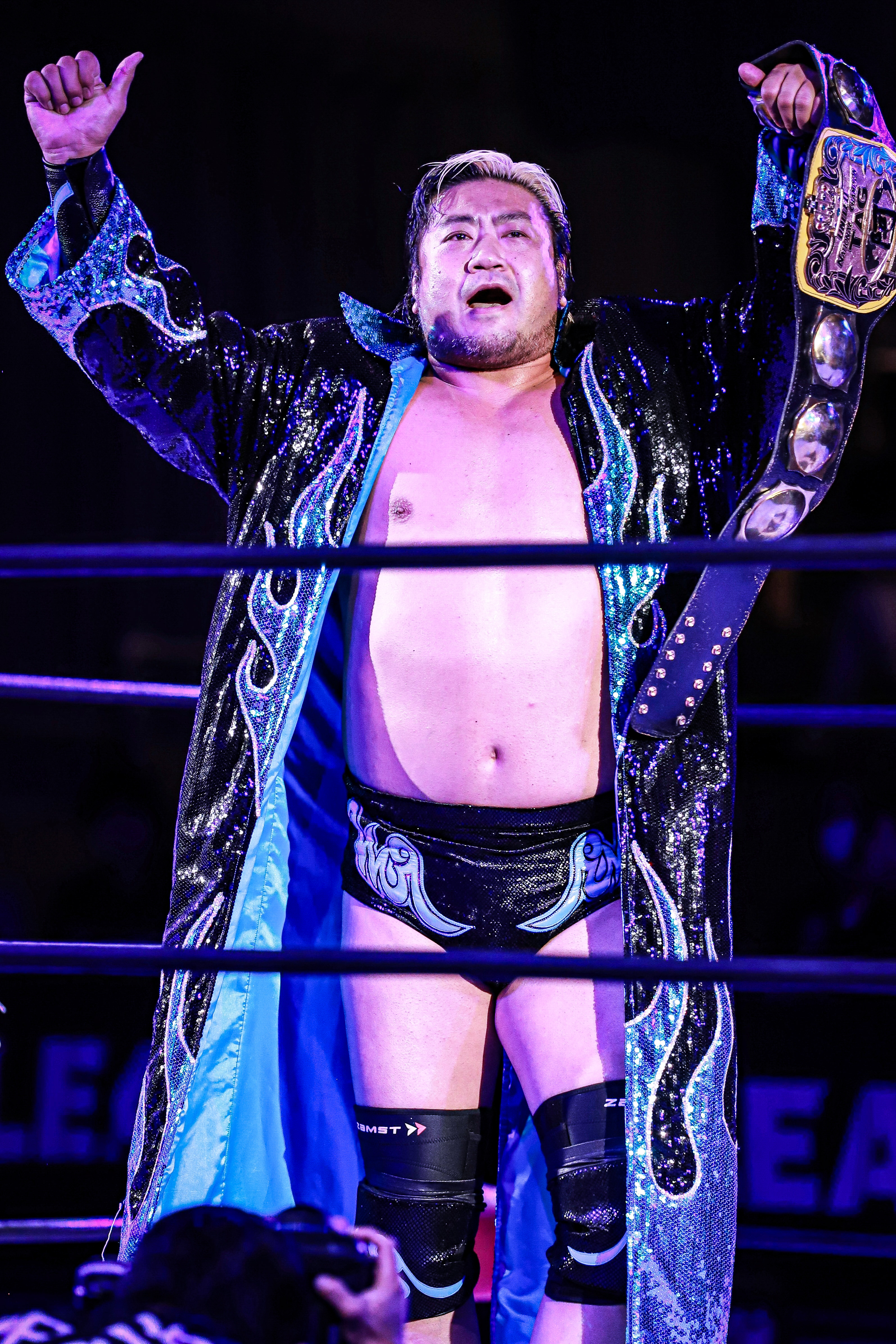
Suwama

=== Heavyweight Wrestlers ===
Ring name	Real name	Unit	Notes
Cal Bloom	Calvin Bloom	HAVOC	Freelancer
Cyrus	Cyrus McWhorter	Hokuto-gun	Freelancer
Daisuke Sekimoto	Daisuke Sekimoto		Freelancer
Davey Boy Smith Jr.	Harry Francis Smith		
Go Shiozaki	Go Shiozaki	Hontai	
Hideki Suzuki	Hideki Suzuki	Baka No Jidai	
Hokuto Omori	Hokuto Omori	Hokuto-gun (L)	
Jack Talos	Zechariah Smith	Hokuto-gun	
Jun Saito	Jun Saito	Saito Brothers	World Tag Team Champion
Kento Miyahara	Kento Miyahara	Hontai (L)	President of talent relations Triple Crown Heavyweight Champion
Kuma Arashi	Kuma Arashi		
Kuroshio Tokyo Japan	Sōjirō Higuchi	Hontai	Freelancer
Masanobu Fuchi	Masanobu Fuchi	Hontai	
Odyssey	Omari Palmer	HAVOC	Freelancer; Gaora TV Champion
Rei Saito	Rei Saito	Saito Brothers; World Tag Team Champion	
Ren Ayabe	Ren Ayabe	ELPIDA	
Ryuki Honda	Ryuki Honda	ELPIDA	
Seigo Tachibana	Seigo Tachibana	Baka No Jidai	Freelancer; Junior Heavyweight Champion
Shotaro Ashino	Shotaro Ashino	HAVOC	
Suwama	Kohei Suwama	Baka No Jidai	Member of the Board of Directors
Takashi	Takashi Yoshida	Dragongate	
Xyon	Daniel Vidot	HAVOC	Freelancer
Yuko Miyamoto	Yuko Miyamoto	Hontai	
Yuma Anzai	Yuma Anzai	ELPIDA (L)	
Yuma Aoyagi	Yuma Aoyagi	Baka No Jidai	AJPW TV Six-Man Tag Team Champion

=== Junior Heavyweight Wrestlers ===
Ring name	Real name	Unit	Notes
Atsuki Aoyagi	Atsuki Aoyagi	Hontai	
Dan Tamura	Dan Tamura	Evolution	
Hikaru Sato	Hiraoki Sato	Evolution	Freelancer
Musashi	Daichi Sasaki	Hontai	
Rising Hayato	Kubo Soto	ELPIDA	Signed to Ehime Pro-Wrestling
Ryo Inoue	Ryo Inoue	Hontai	
Seiki Yoshioka	Seiki Yoshioka	Hontai	
Shota Kofuji	Shota Kofuji	Hontai	
Yasutaka Yano	Yasutaka Yano	Hontai	AJPW TV Six-Man Tag Team Champion

=== Referees ===
Ring name	Real name	Notes
Kimitoshi Ogata	Kimitoshi Ogata	
Kyohei Wada	Kyohei Wada	Senior Official
Nikkan Lee	Yuki Ito	
Daisuke Kanbayashi	Daisuke Kanbayashi	

== Corporate ==
Name	Notes
Tsuyoki Fukuda	President
Mikio Sasahara	Executive Vice President
Kazufumi Yoshimura	Chairman of the board
Dory Funk Jr.	Pacific Wrestling Federation Chairman

== Notable alumni ==
Multiple identities used by the same wrestler are in chronological order. In case of alternate identities used infrequently (Great Muta, Shiryu), the identity with the most frequency of use will be listed first.

=== Native ===
- Ahii
- Alejandro
- Akebono (Note: Originally from Hawaii, United States)
- Akira Hyodo
- Atsushi Aoki
- Arashi
- Giant Baba
- Bushi/T28
- Riki Choshu
- Kim Duk
- Haruka Eigen
- Fujita
- Masakatsu Funaki
- Ryota Hama
- Gran Hamada
- Animal Hamaguchi
- Ashura Hara
- Rocky Hata
- Hayabusa
- Kaz Hayashi/Shiryu
- Tamon Honda
- Tomoaki Honma
- Taichi Ishikari
- Takashi Ishikawa
- Jun Izumida
- Yoshinobu Kanemaru
- Koji Kanemoto
- Kendo Kashin
- Toshiaki Kawada
- Ryuichi Kawakami
- Tsuyoshi Kikuchi
- Kazumi Kikuta
- Kikutaro
- Rusher Kimura
- Kenta Kobashi
- KENTA
- Kuniaki Kobayashi
- Satoshi Kojima/The Great Kosuke
- Masayuki Kono/Kono
- Shiro Koshinaka
- Samson Kutsuwada
- Kyotaro
- Naomichi Marufuji
- Hiro Matsuda
- Mazada
- Mitsuharu Misawa
- Kazushi Miyamoto
- Mitsuo Momota
- Takeshi Morishima
- Keiji Mutoh/The Great Muta
- Takato Nakano
- Yasufumi Nakanoue
- Yoshinari Ogawa
- Kintarō Ōki
- Atsushi Onita
- Akira Raijin/Sushi
- Takeshi Rikio
- Nosawa Rongai
- Hiro Saito
- Kazuo Sakurada
- Seiya Sanada
- The Great Sasuke
- Satoru Sayama
- Ryota Nakatsu
- Kentaro Shiga
- Jinsei Shinzaki
- Go Shiozaki
- Kazuharu Sonoda
- Manabu Soya
- Super Hate
- Super Strong Machine
- Akihisa Takachiho/The Great Kabuki
- Yoshihiro Takayama
- Masato Tanaka
- Minoru Tanaka
- Yoshi Tatsu
- Akira Taue
- Genichiro Tenryu
- Jumbo Tsuruta
- Taru
- Kaji Tomato
- Umanosuke Ueda
- Andy Wu
- Hiroshi Yamato
- "brother" Yasshi
- Yoshiaki Yatsu
- Toshiyuki Sakuda
- Takayuki Ueki
- Tank Nagai
- Choun Shiryu
- Takoyakida
- Naoya Nomura
- Zeus
- Koji Iwamoto
- Yoshihisa Uto
- Koji Doi
- Shu Asakawa
- Oji Shiiba
- Yuki Ishikawa
- Musashi
- Yu Iizuka

=== Gaijin ===
- Abdullah the Butcher
- Johnny Ace
- Baliyan Akki
- Gary Albright
- André the Giant
- Bambi Killer
- Bob Backlund
- The Beast
- Giant Bernard
- Dick Beyer
- Big Daddy Voodoo
- Bam Bam Bigelow
- Aigle Blanc
- Nick Bockwinkel
- Jack Brisco
- D'Lo Brown
- Bruiser Brody
- Killer Tim Brooks
- Super Destroyer
- Lance Cade
- Rob Van Dam
- Ted DiBiase
- J. J. Dillon
- Tommy Dreamer
- René Duprée
- Wayne Ferris
- Reid Flair
- Ric Flair
- Mick Foley
- Dory Funk Jr.
- Terry Funk
- Doug Furnas
- Anton Geesink
- Luke Graham
- King Curtis Iaukea
- Dynamite Kid
- Gene Kiniski
- Terry Gordy
- Stan Hansen
- Charlie Haas
- Curt Hennig
- Hulk Hogan
- Don Leo Jonathan
- Rufus R. Jones
- Tor Kamata
- Steve Keirn
- Dan Kroffat
- Buddy Landell
- Mark Lewin
- Mil Máscaras
- Mario Milano
- Ron Miller
- Gorilla Monsoon
- Dick Murdoch
- Pat O'Connor
- Larry O'Dea
- Bob Orton, Jr.
- The Patriot
- Prince Tonga/Meng
- Antonio Pugliese
- Harley Race
- Raja Lion
- Apache Bull Ramos
- Billy Robinson
- Bob Roop
- Rick Rude
- Ro'z (Matt Anoa'i)
- Bruno Sammartino
- Mikel Scicluna
- Larry Sharpe
- Tiger Jeet Singh
- Dick Slater
- Alexis Smirnoff
- Davey Boy Smith
- Johnny Smith
- Tracy Smothers
- Jimmy Snuka
- Ricky Steamboat
- Mongolian Stomper
- Super Crazy
- Antonio Thomas
- Big Van Vader
- Vampiro
- David Von Erich
- Fritz Von Erich
- Kerry Von Erich
- Kevin Von Erich
- Sailor White
- Bill White
- "Dr. Death" Steve Williams
- Barry Windham
- Tim Woods
- Jimmy Yang
- Gianni Valletta
- Parrow
- Odinson

=== Joshi talent ===
- Maya Yukihi
- Miyuki Takase
- Mochi Miyagi
- Risa Sera
- Tae Honma
- Tsukushi

== See also ==
- List of professional wrestling rosters
