= Carbell Ito =

Japanese professional wrestler

Personal information
- Born: 19 September 1970 (age 55) Saijō, Japan

Professional wrestling career
- Ring name: Carbell Ito ATM
- Billed height: 175 cm (5 ft 9 in)
- Billed weight: 79 kg (174 lb)
- Debut: 2016

Kazumasa Ito (伊藤一正, Itō Kazumasa), known by his ring name Carbell Ito, is a Japanese professional wrestler and businessman signed to All Japan Pro Wrestling (AJPW). He is a former AJPW TV Six-Man Tag Team Champion, as well as the representative director of the Japanese auto retail company he founded, Carbell.

== Professional wrestling career ==
=== Mexican independent circuit (2016) ===
In late 2015, Ito traveled to Mexico because he did not meet the minimum entry height requirement of 180 cm (5 ft 11 in) for Japanese professional wrestling organizations. He made his wrestling debut in Mexico in January 2016. On 19 November 2016, he made his Japanese debut at the Korakuen Hall by teaming up with wrestlers Manabu Hara and Akebono against wrestlers Zeus, Naoya Nomura, and Hiroshi "Dokonjo" Kondo.

=== All Japan Pro Wrestling (2017–present) ===
Ito made his professional wrestling debut in All Japan Pro Wrestling at AJPW Chiba Extra Dream 16 on 9 July 2017, where he teamed up with Takao Omori to defeat Kazuki Okubo and Manabu Hara in a tag team competition.

During his time with AJPW, Ito competed in various championships. He is a three-time AJPW TV Six-Man Tag Team Champion, a title that he first won alongside Takao Omori and Black Menso-re by defeating Daimonji So, Revlon, and Ryouji Sai at AJPW Prime Night on 13 December 2020, making them inaugural champions. He won the title once more alongside "Yoshitatsu Kingdom" stablemates Seigo Tachibana and Yoshi Tatsu at AJPW Summer Action Series 2021 on 22 July 2021 by defeating Total Eclipse (Tajiri, Yusuke Kodama, and Hokuto Omori).

On 7 December 2022, on the eighth night of the Real World Tag League, Ito teamed up with Black Menso-re to unsuccessfully challenge Gungnir Of Anarchy (Masao Hanahata and Yusuke Kodama), Masao Inoue and Takao Omori, and Tajiri and Yoshi Tatsu for the All Asia Tag Team Championship.

=== Professional Wrestling Just Tap Out (2021–present) ===
Ito is also known for sporadically competing in Professional Wrestling Just Tap Out. At the JTO Tournament 2023 Final on 3 March 2023, he defeated Mr. Mask to win the UWA World Light Heavyweight Championship, which was sanctioned by JTO at the time. At JTO Hatsu on 10 January 2025, Ito teamed up with Arata to defeat Myo-o (Ibuki and Miyamasa) for the JTO Tag Team Championship in a four-way tag team match also involving pairings Ara/Naoya Akama and Bomber Tatsuya/Thunder Masami.

=== Japanese independent circuit (2017–present) ===
Ito is known for his work in various promotions from the Japanese independent scene. At an event promoted by Kaientai Dojo, 16th Anniversary Club-K Super Evolution 16, on 22 April 2018, Ito teamed up with Ricky Fuji and Yoshihiro Horaguchi in a five-way gauntlet match for the Chiba Six Man Tag Team Championship. The championship was won by Happy Big Circus (Dinosaur Takuma, Kotaro Yoshino and Yuma), and also involved the teams of Aki Shizuku/Bambi/Makoto, Go Asakawa/Tomato Kaji/Marines Mask, and Kelly Sixx/DSK/One Man Kru.

== Personal life ==
Kazumasa Ito is the representative director of the Japanese auto retail company Carbell, which he founded in 2006. He was inspired by Satoru Sayama (the first persona of Tiger Mask) as a boy, as he aspired to become a professional wrestler. On February 8, 2020, he joined the Ikushima Planning Office.

== Media Presence ==
His unique blend of business and athletics often keeps him in the public eye, including hosting his own segments on Japanese radio.

== Championships and accomplishments ==
- All Japan Pro Wrestling
  - AJPW TV Six-Man Tag Team Championship (3 times, inaugural) – with Takao Omori and Black Menso-re (2) and Seigo Tachibana and Yoshi Tatsu (1)
  - All Japan vs. Ehime Pro 1 Day Six Man Tag Tournament (2019) – Jun Akiyama and Rising Hayato
- Professional Wrestling Just Tap Out
  - JTO Tag Team Championship (1 time) – with Arata
  - UWA World Middleweight Championship (1 time)
