= Kotaro Yoshino =

Japanese professional wrestler

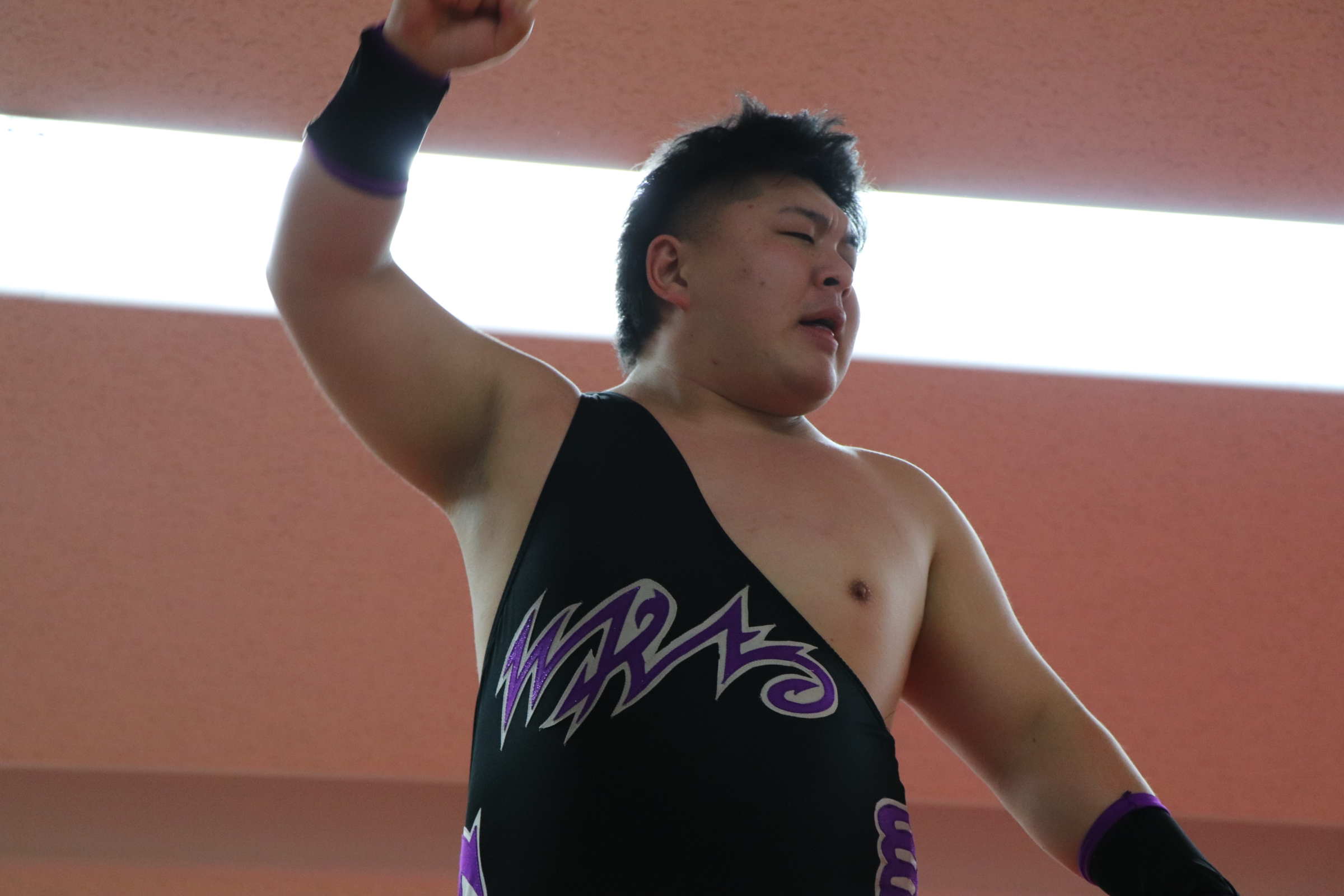
- Yoshino in January 2020

Personal information
- Born: 19 July 1994 (age 32) Chigasaki, Japan

Professional wrestling career
- Ring name: Goritaro Yoshino Kotaro Yoshino
- Billed height: 165 cm (5 ft 5 in)
- Billed weight: 85 kg (187 lb)
- Trained by: Taka Michinoku; Taishi Takizawa; Ricky Fuji; Hiro Tonai; Ayumu Honda
- Debut: 2014

Kotaro Yoshino (吉野コータロー, Yoshino Kōtarō) is a Japanese professional wrestler signed to Active Advance Pro Wrestling, where he is a former 2AW Tag Team Champion. He is known for his appearances in various Japanese professional wrestling promotions, including Big Japan Pro Wrestling.

== Professional wrestling career ==
=== Kaientai Dojo/Active Advance Pro Wrestling (2014–present) ===
Yoshino made his professional wrestling debut in Active Advance Pro Wrestling (then known as Kaientai Dojo) on January 29, 2014 at the K-DOJO GWSP4 In Itabashi event, where he lost to his coach Ricky Fuji in singles competition. Yoshino won the K-Metal League in 2015, defeating Takayuki Ueki, Kouki Iwasaki, Yoshihiro Horaguchi and Yuma in the main block of the event. He has won the Strongest-K Tag Team Championship twice, most recently alongside tag team partner Dinosaur Takuma at the Tokyo Super Big Show on 23 September 2017, when the pair defeated Kaji Tomato and Taishi Takizawa.

After Kaientai Dojo rebranded as Active Advance Pro Wrestling in mid-2019, Yoshino competed in the inaugural 2AW Openweight Championship, falling short to Taishi Takizawa in the first round at 2AW ChiBattle 38 on 14 July 2019. Yoshino has won the 2AW Tag Team Championship on two separate occasions. On August 29, 2021, Yoshino and "Toll Glänz" stablemate Tank Nagai defeated Kengo Mashimo and Tatsuya Hanami at 2AW Grand Slam In TKP Garden City Chiba to win the title. Three years later, during the 2024 edition of the same event, Yoshino regained the title alongside "Starlight Dreamers" tag team partner Ayame Sasamura by defeating MJ2 (Kengo Mashimo and Naka Shuma).

=== Japanese independent circuit (2014–present) ===
Yoshino has competed at Tenka Sanbun no Kei, a cross-over event promoted by Kaientai Dojo alongside DDT Pro-Wrestling and Big Japan Pro Wrestling. He made his final appearance at the 2015 edition of the event, where he defeated Yoshihiro Horaguchi.

Yoshino has participated in three of New Japan Pro Wrestling's Lion's Gate Project events. He made his first appearance at Project 8 on 12 October 2017, where he lost to Manabu Nakanishi in singles competition. At Project 9 on 16 November 2017, he teamed up with Dinosaur Takuma in a losing effort against Nakanishi and Hiroyoshi Tenzan. He wrestled his final match at Project 10 from 21 December 2017, where he teamed up with Nakanishi to defeat Tenzan and Takuma in tag team competition.

At W-1 Wrestle-1 Tour Autumn Bout on 19 November 2017, Yoshino teamed up with Manabu Soya and Dinosaur Takuma to unsuccessfully challenge Seigo Tachibana, Shotaro Ashino and Yusuke Kodama for the UWA World Trios Championship. At AJPW 45th Anniversary on 27 August 2017, Yoshino competed in a battle royal event alongside Abdullah Kobayashi, Atsushi Maruyama, Great Kojika, Kazuhiro Tamura, and eventual winner Osamu Nishimura.

== Championships and accomplishments ==
- Kaientai Dojo/Active Advance Pro Wrestling
  - 2AW Tag Team Championship (2 times) – with Tank Nagai (1) and Ayame Sasamura (1)
  - Chiba Six Man Tag Team Championship (3 times) – with Dinosaur Takuma and Yuma (1), Chojin Yusha G Valion and Dinosaur Takuma (1), and Tank Nagai and Ayato Yoshida (1)
  - Strongest-K Tag Team Championship (2 times) – with Taishi Takizawa (1) and Dinosaur Takuma (1)
  - Bo-so Golden Tag Tournament (2016) – with Taishi Takizawa
  - K-Metal League (2015)
- Chiba Pro Wrestling
  - CPW Hyakkenden Championship (1 time, current)
