= Kotaro Suzuki =

Japanese professional wrestler (born 1978)

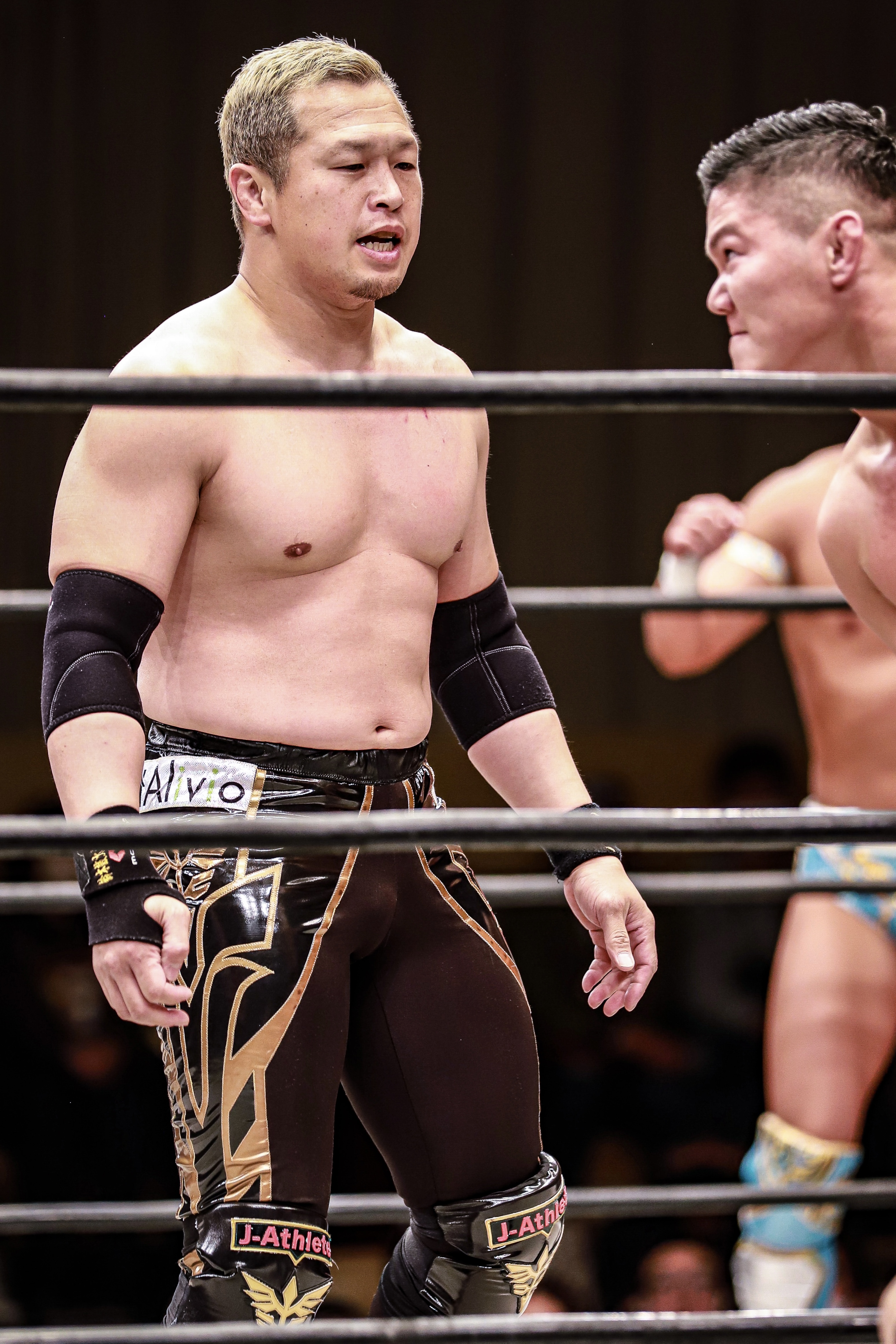
- Suzuki in April 2023

Personal information
- Born: Yasuhiro Suzuki; June 18, 1978 (age 48) Warabi, Saitama

Professional wrestling career
- Ring name(s): Kevin Mask; Kotaro Suzuki; Mushiking Terry; Tiger Emperor; Yasuhiro Suzuki
- Billed height: 1.70 m (5 ft 7 in)
- Billed weight: 86 kg (190 lb)
- Trained by: Mitsuharu Misawa; Pro Wrestling Noah
- Debut: December 24, 2001

Yasuhiro Suzuki (鈴木 康弘, Suzuki Yasuhiro; born June 18, 1978), better known by the ring name Kotaro Suzuki (鈴木 鼓太郎, Suzuki Kotarō), is a Japanese professional wrestler currently signed to Gleat. He is best known for working for the Pro Wrestling Noah and All Japan Pro Wrestling promotions, where he was a four-time GHC Junior Heavyweight Champion for Noah and a one-time World Junior Heavyweight Champion for AJPW.

== Career ==
=== Pro Wrestling Noah (2001–2013) ===
Suzuki was the last person remaining of a grueling thirty person training class in Pro Wrestling Noah's dojo. He debuted on Noah's 2001 Christmas show, and started wrestling under his real name of Yasuhiro Suzuki, but quickly changed it to Kotaro Suzuki. He challenged twice for the GHC Junior Heavyweight Championship in 2004, and was unsuccessful in both attempts.

In 2005, he ended up adopting the guise of Mushiking Terry, a gimmick tying into the card/arcade game Mushiking: King of the Beetles, defeating "Mushiking Joker" in his debut at DESTINY 2005 on July 18, 2005 at the Tokyo Dome, but his challenge for KENTA's GHC Junior Heavyweight Championship on October 28, 2005 was unsuccessful after KENTA started performing heel actions such as faking a low blow as well as mockingly joining in a Terry chant while applying a camel clutch. At the January 21, 2007 Budokan Hall show, he pinned Mark Briscoe to take the GHC Jr. Tag title for himself and Ricky Marvin. At the April 28, 2007 show, he defeated Tatsuhito Takaiwa to win the GHC Junior Heavyweight Championship (as Mushiking Terry). At Noah's Budokan show! Autumn Navigation '07, Suzuki (As Mushiking Terry) lost his GHC Junior Heavyweight Championship to Yoshinobu Kanemaru. He later betrayed Marvin by joining with Yoshinobu Kanemaru in tag team, which ended with them winning the GHC Junior Heavyweight Championship. Suzuki and Kanemaru joined with Genba Hirayanagi, and later joined the stable Disobey with Takeshi Rikio and Muhammad Yone. When Mitsuharu Misawa died, Suzuki (who was one of his students) adopted not just a green attire resembling the green tights of his mentor but started to use some moves like elbows and the Tiger Driver to pay him tribute and became a face again. He was later expulsed from Disobey and started a rivalry with his former partner Kanemaru. Suzuki would regain the GHC Junior Heavyweight Title from Kanemaru on December 5, 2010, ending his long title run. On July 30, 2011, Suzuki and Atsushi Aoki defeated Kenta and Yoshinobu Kanemaru to win the 2011 NTV G+ Cup Junior Heavyweight Tag League, making both of them two-time winners of the tournament. On September 23, 2011, Suzuki lost the GHC Junior Heavyweight Championship to Katsuhiko Nakajima. On October 16, 2011, Suzuki and Aoki defeated KENTA and Yoshinobu Kanemaru to win the GHC Junior Heavyweight Tag Team Championship. They lost the title to Ricky Marvin and Super Crazy on July 22, 2012. On December 19, 2012, Noah announced that Suzuki would be leaving the promotion, after refusing to re-sign after Kenta Kobashi was fired. On December 24, Suzuki defeated Genba Hirayanagi in his final Noah match.

=== All Japan Pro Wrestling (2013–2015) ===
On January 26, 2013, Suzuki, Atsushi Aoki, Go Shiozaki, Jun Akiyama and Yoshinobu Kanemaru, all of whom had quit Noah at the same time, announced that they had joined All Japan Pro Wrestling, forming the "Burning" stable. Suzuki and Aoki received their first shot at the All Asia Tag Team Championship on March 17, but were defeated by the defending champions, Koji Kanemoto and Minoru Tanaka. On April 7, Suzuki and Aoki defeated Hikaru Sato and Hiroshi Yamato to win the 2013 Junior Hyper Tag League and earn another shot at Kanemoto and Tanaka. On April 25, Suzuki and Aoki defeated Kanemoto and Tanaka in a rematch to become the new All Asia Tag Team Champions. On May 11, Suzuki made a one night return to Noah to take part in Kenta Kobashi's retirement event, Final Burning in Budokan, during which he and Aoki defeated Kentaro Shiga and Tamon Honda in a tag team match. On July 5, following a mass exodus led by Keiji Mutoh, it was announced that Suzuki, along with the rest of Burning, had signed an exclusive contract with All Japan. On October 29, Suzuki quit Burning in order to challenge Kanemaru for the World Junior Heavyweight Championship. On November 21, Suzuki and Aoki, along with Kento Miyahara, joined Go Shiozaki's new Xceed stable. On January 26, 2014, Suzuki and Aoki lost the All Asia Tag Team Championship to former Burning stablemates Jun Akiyama and Yoshinobu Kanemaru. On February 5, Suzuki's longtime partnership with Aoki came to an end, when Aoki quit Xceed to go solo. Immediately afterwards, Suzuki went on a win streak, which culminated with him defeating Masaaki Mochizuki on February 16 to win the 2014 Jr. Battle of Glory. As a result, Suzuki received a shot at the World Junior Heavyweight Championship, but was defeated by the defending champion, Último Dragón, on February 23. On May 17, Suzuki defeated Sushi to win the Gaora TV Championship. On August 16, Suzuki and Kento Miyahara defeated Keisuke Ishii and Shigehiro Irie to win the All Asia Tag Team Championship. On December 14, Suzuki lost the Gaora TV Championship to Kenso. On January 3, 2015, Suzuki and Miyahara lost the All Asia Tag Team Championship to Mitsuya Nagai and Takeshi Minamino. On February 20, Suzuki won his second Jr. Battle of Glory in a row, defeating reigning World Junior Heavyweight Champion Atsushi Aoki in the finals. This led to a rematch on March 27, where Suzuki defeated Aoki to become the new World Junior Heavyweight Champion. On November 16, while he was still the World Junior Heavyweight Champion, Suzuki announced he would be leaving All Japan on November 30. He had signed a new one-year contract the previous July, but when the contract was afterwards changed twice, he decided to instead leave the promotion. Following the announcement, the World Junior Heavyweight Championship was vacated and Xceed disbanded.

=== Freelancer (2016–2024) ===
On January 10 at Wrestle-1 Sunshine Tour after Hiroshi Yamato's title celebration Suzuki appeared and he set his sights on the Wrestle-1 Cruiser Division Championship belt. On January 22, he made an appearance in Pro Wrestling Zero1 by attacking Shinjiro Otani after his match and made a statement that he wants his belt and he makes alliance with Mineo Fujita. On February 10, he defeated Andy Wu on his Wrestle-1 debut. On February 22, Suzuki appeared on FMW in a tag team match when he and Masato Tanaka defeated Tomohiko Hashimoto and Buffalo. On March 12, Suzuki defeated Minoru Tanaka in the finals of a tournament to win the vacant Wrestle-1 Cruiser Division Championship. Suzuki would be the first man to defend the championship outside of Japan, defending the belt on two occasions, one at 4 Front Wrestling against Mark Haskins, and secondly at Pro Wrestling Pride against Ultimo Tiger. After six successful defenses, Suzuki lost the title to Yusuke Kodama on August 11. On September 18, Suzuki and Kaz Hayashi won the vacant Wrestle-1 Tag Team Championship. On February 3, 2017, Suzuki defeated Shinjiro Otani to win Zero1's International Junior Heavyweight and NWA World Junior Heavyweight Championships. On March 20, Suzuki and Hayashi lost the Wrestle-1 Tag Team Championship to Koji Doi and Kumagoro. On October 26, Suzuki lost his Zero1 titles to Sean Guinness.

On September 1, 2018, Suzuki returned to Noah at Naomichi Marufuji's 20th anniversary show, where he teamed with HI69 and Minoru Tanaka to defeat Seiya Morohashi, Hitoshi Kumano and Hajime Ohara and afterwards brawled with them. This led to him competing in the 2018 Global Junior Heavyweight League, where he finished with a record of four wins and one loss, including a win over reigning GHC Junior Heavyweight Champion Daisuke Harada and defeated Yo-Hey in the finals. This led to a match on October 30, where Suzuki defeated Harada to win the GHC Junior Heavyweight Championship for the third time. He later won the GHC Junior Heavyweight Tag Team Championship with Yoshinari Ogawa and formed a stable named Stinger later joined by Atsushi Kotoge and Chris Ridgeway.

=== Gleat (2024–present) ===
On September 22, 2024, it was announced that Suzuki had joined Gleat as part of the Black Generation International stable.

== Championships and accomplishments ==
- All Japan Pro Wrestling
  - All Asia Tag Team Championship (3 times) – with Atsushi Aoki (1), Kento Miyahara (1) and Jun Akiyama (1)
  - Gaora TV Championship (1 time)
  - World Junior Heavyweight Championship (1 time)
  - Jr. Battle of Glory (2014, 2015)
  - Junior Hyper Tag League (2013) – with Atsushi Aoki
  - Jr. Tag Battle of Glory (2023) – with Kaito Ishida
- DDT Pro-Wrestling
  - KO-D 6-Man Tag Team Championship (1 time, current) – with Tetsuya Endo and Yusuke Okada
- Dragon Gate
  - Open the Triangle Gate Championship (2 times) – with Nosawa Rongai and Eita
- New Japan Pro-Wrestling
  - Tag Team Best Bout (2003) with Naomichi Marufuji vs. Jyushin Thunder Liger and Koji Kanemoto on June 10
- Pro Wrestling Illustrated
  - Ranked No. 113 of the top 500 singles wrestlers in the PWI 500 in 2007
- Pro Wrestling Noah
  - GHC Junior Heavyweight Championship (4 times)
  - GHC Junior Heavyweight Tag Team Championship (5 times) – with Ricky Marvin (1), Yoshinobu Kanemaru (1), Atsushi Aoki (1), Yoshinari Ogawa (1), and Atsushi Kotoge (1)
  - Global Junior Heavyweight League (2018)
  - Nippon TV Cup Jr. Heavyweight Tag League (2009) – with Yoshinobu Kanemaru
  - NTV G+ Cup Junior Heavyweight Tag League (2011) – with Atsushi Aoki
  - Global Junior Heavyweight Tag League (2019) – with Yoshinari Ogawa
  - One Day Jr. Heavyweight Six Man Tag Tournament (2008) – with Yoshinobu Kanemaru and Genba Hirayanagi
- Pro Wrestling Zero1
  - International Junior Heavyweight Championship (1 time)
  - NWA World Junior Heavyweight Championship (1 time)
- Wrestle-1
  - Wrestle-1 Cruiser Division Championship (1 time)
  - Wrestle-1 Tag Team Championship (1 time) – with Kaz Hayashi
  - Wrestle-1 Cruiser Division Fourth Generation Champion Tournament (2016)

=== Luchas de Apuestas record ===
Winner (wager)	Loser (wager)	Location	Event	Date	Notes
Tiger Emperor (mask)	Ricky Marvin (hair)	Tokyo, Japan	Encountering Navigation 2005	April 2, 2005	
