= AJPW Junior Tag League =

Japanese wrestling tournament

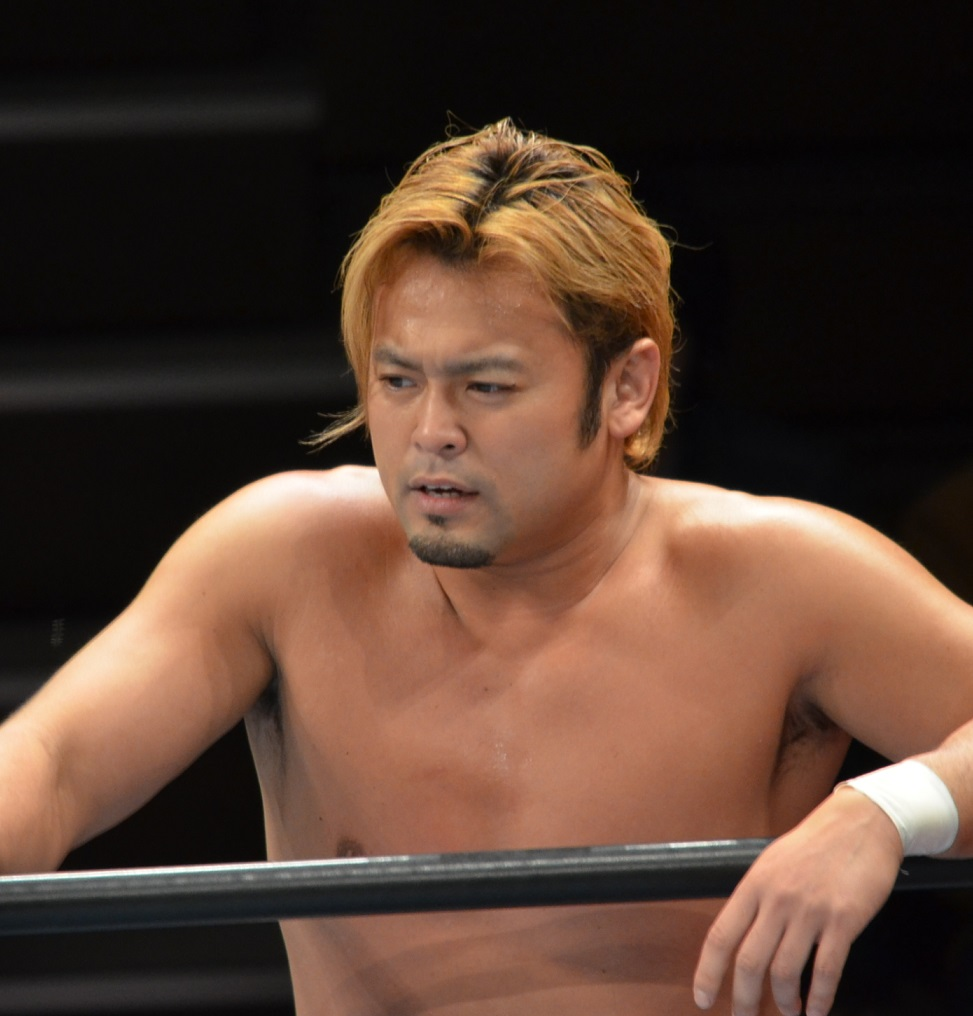
Kaz Hayashi, who has won the tournament three times

The Junior Tag League is an annual professional wrestling tag team tournament held by the All Japan Pro Wrestling (AJPW) promotion. The tournament is meant for wrestlers under the weight limit of 100 kg (220 lb), who are referred to in Japan as junior heavyweights. In 2013, the tournament was rebranded Junior Hyper Tag League (ジュニア・ハイパー・タッグ・リーグ, Junia Haipā Taggu Rīgu), following in the footsteps of the Junior League, which had been renamed "Junior Hyper League" the previous year. In 2014, the tournament was again rebranded after the singles Junior League, now taking the name Jr. Tag Battle of Glory (ジュニア・タッグバトル・オブ・グローリー, Junia Taggu Batoru Obu Gurōrī).

The tournament is contested in a single block round-robin format with all teams facing each other once. All matches have a thirty-minute time limit and in case of a time limit draw, both teams are awarded one point, while a win earns a team two points. In case of a draw through a double countout, the match is declared a no contest with neither team being awarded a point. After all teams have faced each other, the top two teams move onto the finals to determine the winner of the tournament. Rankings in the tournament are not determined by head-to-head matches and in the event of more than two teams finishing clear of the other teams, extra matches will be held to determine the finalists. Usually, the winners of the tournament earn themselves a shot at All Japan's secondary tag team championship, the All Asia Tag Team Championship, if not already the reigning champions.

Hikaru Sato holds the record for most Junior Tag League wins with five. Sato and Atsushi Aoki are the only team to have won the tournament more than once, having won it in 2014, 2015 and 2016.

== List of winners ==
- 1984: Gran Hamada and Mighty Inoue
- 2002: Jimmy Yang and Kaz Hayashi
- 2006: Mazada and Nosawa Rongai
- 2008: Katsuhiko Nakajima and Ryuji Hijikata
- 2009: Minoru and Toshizo
- 2010: Bushi and Super Crazy
- 2011: Kai and Kaz Hayashi
- 2012: Kaz Hayashi and Shuji Kondo
- 2013: Atsushi Aoki and Kotaro Suzuki
- 2014: Atsushi Aoki and Hikaru Sato
- 2015: Atsushi Aoki and Hikaru Sato
- 2016: Atsushi Aoki and Hikaru Sato
- 2017: Atsushi Maruyama and Masashi Takeda
- 2018: Koji Iwamoto and Tajiri
- 2019: Hikaru Sato and Yusuke Okada
- 2020: Evolution (Dan Tamura and Hikaru Sato)
- 2021: Total Eclipse (Yusuke Kodama and Hokuto Omori)
- 2023 : Black Generation International (Kaito Ishida and Kotaro Suzuki)

== 1984 ==
In 1984, All Japan Pro Wrestling held the "International Junior Heavyweight Tag Team League" between August 30 and September 12.

Final standings
Wrestlers	Score
Gran Hamada and Mighty Inoue	7
Chavo Guerrero and Héctor Guerrero	5
Atsushi Onita and Masanobu Fuchi	4
Magic Dragon and Ultra Seven	3
Baby Face and Fishman	0

Results	Onita Fuchi	Face Fishman	Chavo Héctor	Hamada Inoue	Dragon Seven
Onita Fuchi	X	Onita; Fuchi (10:22)	DCO (12:17)	No Contest (9:23)	Onita; Fuchi (18:17)
Face Fishman	Onita; Fuchi (10:22)	X	Chavo; Hector (7:08)	Hamada; Inoue (10:09)	Dragon; Seven (12:15)
Chavo Héctor	DCO (12:17)	Chavo; Hector (7:08)	X	Draw (30:00)	Chavo; Hector (11:38)
Hamada Inoue	No Contest (9:23)	Hamada; Inoue (10:09)	Draw (30:00)	X	Hamda; Inoue (14:58)
Dragon Seven	Onita; Fuchi (18:17)	Dragon; Seven (12:15)	Chavo; Hector (11:38)	Hamda; Inoue (14:58)	X

Final
1	Gran Hamada and Mighty Inoue	Pin
2	Chavo Guerrero Sr. and Héctor Guerrero	9:49

== 2002 ==
In 2002, All Japan Pro Wrestling held the first "World's Strongest Junior Tag League", a junior heavyweight version of the World's Strongest Tag Determination League. The tournament took place over eleven shows between September 8 and 22. The day after winning the tournament, Jimmy Yang and Kaz Hayashi went on to unsuccessfully challenge Arashi and Nobutaka Araya for the All Asia Tag Team Championship.

Final standings
Wrestlers	Score
Kendo Kashin and Robbie Brookside	6
Jimmy Yang and Kaz Hayashi	5
Gran Hamada and Masanobu Fuchi	5
Dark Guerrera and Gran Naniwa	2
Kazushi Miyamoto and Ryuji Hijikata	2

Results	Guerrera Naniwa	Hamada Fuchi	Yang Hayashi	Miyamoto Hijikata	Kashin Brookside
Guerrera Naniwa	X	Guerrera; Naniwa (12:11)	Yang; Hayashi (13:21)	Miyamoto; Hijikata (12:59)	Kashin; Brookside (10:29)
Hamada Fuchi	Guerrera; Naniwa (12:11)	X	Draw (30:00)	Hamada; Fuchi (9:24)	Hamada; Fuchi (3:11)
Yang Hayashi	Yang; Hayashi (13:21)	Draw (30:00)	X	Yang; Hayashi (11:25)	Kashin; Brookside (12:29)
Miyamoto Hijikata	Miyamoto; Hijikata (12:59)	Hamada; Fuchi (9:24)	Yang; Hayashi (11:25)	X	Kashin; Brookside (10:39)
Kashin Brookside	Kashin; Brookside (10:29)	Hamada; Fuchi (3:11)	Kashin; Brookside (12:29)	Kashin; Brookside (10:39)	X

Finalist decision match			Final
			1	Kendo Kashin and Robbie Brookside	Pin
2	Jimmy Yang and Kaz Hayashi	Pin	3	Jimmy Yang and Kaz Hayashi	13:52
3	Gran Hamada and Masanobu Fuchi	15:47

== 2006 ==
After a four-year break, All Japan Pro Wrestling held its first Junior Tag League over nine shows between February 25 and March 10, 2006.

Final standings
Wrestlers	Score
"brother" Yasshi and Shuji Kondo	10
Mazada and Nosawa Rongai	6
Akira and Ryuji Hijikata	4
Katsuhiko Nakajima and Taiji Ishimori	4
Kaz Hayashi and Taka Michinoku	4
Kikujiro and Kikutaro	2

Results	Akira Hijikata	Yasshi Kondo	Nakajima Ishimori	Hayashi Michinoku	Kikujiro Kikutaro	Mazada Rongai
Akira Hijikata	X	Yasshi; Kondo (9:43)	Nakajima; Ishimori (16:06)	Akira; Hijikata (16:51)	Akira; Hijikata (14:46)	Mazada; Nosawa (16:18)
Yasshi Kondo	Yasshi; Kondo (9:43)	X	Yasshi; Kondo (12:56)	Yasshi; Kondo (13:17)	Yasshi; Kondo (14:03)	Yasshi; Kondo (14:05)
Nakajima Ishimori	Nakajima; Ishimori (16:06)	Yasshi; Kondo (12:56)	X	Hayashi; Michinoku (17:18)	Nakajima; Ishimori (11:06)	Mazada; Nosawa (15:18)
Hayashi Michinoku	Akira; Hijikata (16:51)	Yasshi; Kondo (13:17)	Hayashi; Michinoku (17:18)	X	Hayashi; Michinoku (13:01)	Mazada; Nosawa (forfeit)
Kikujiro Kikutaro	Akira; Hijikata (14:46)	Yasshi; Kondo (14:03)	Nakajima; Ishimori (11:06)	Hayashi; Michinoku (13:01)	X	Kikujiro; Kikutaro (16:05)
Mazada Rongai	Mazada; Nosawa (16:18)	Yasshi; Kondo (14:05)	Mazada; Nosawa (15:18)	Mazada; Nosawa (forfeit)	Kikujiro; Kikutaro (16:05)	X

Final
1	"brother" Yasshi and Shuji Kondo	Pin
2	Mazada and Nosawa Rongai	18:06

== 2008 ==
After no Junior Tag League took place in 2007, the tournament returned in early 2008, held over seven shows between March 12 and 23.

Final standings
Wrestlers	Score
El Samurai and Kaz Hayashi	6
Katsuhiko Nakajima and Ryuji Hijikata	6
Mazada and Nosawa Rongai	5
Shuji Kondo and Silver King	5
Hiroshi Yamato and Kai	4
Kushida and T28	4

Results	Samurai Hayashi	Yamato Kai	Nakajima Hijikata	Kushida T28	Mazada Nosawa	Kondo Silver
Samurai Hayashi	X	Samurai; Hayashi (16:08)	Samurai; Hayashi (12:47)	Kushida; T28 (14:22)	Mazada; Nosawa (10:09)	Samurai; Hayashi (16:05)
Yamato Kai	Samurai; Hayashi (16:08)	X	Yamato; Kai (13:00)	Kushida; T28 (12:03)	Yamato; Kai (13:42)	Kondo; Silver (8:11)
Nakajima Hijikata	Samurai; Hayashi (12:47)	Yamato; Kai (13:00)	X	Nakajima; Hijikata (13:06)	Nakajima; Hijikata (17:24)	Nakajima; Hijikata (12:34)
Kushida T28	Kushida; T28 (14:22)	Kushida; T28 (12:03)	Nakajima; Hijikata (13:06)	X	Mazada; Nosawa (16:42)	Kondo; Silver (12:19)
Mazada Nosawa	Mazada; Nosawa (10:09)	Yamato; Kai (13:42)	Nakajima; Hijikata (17:24)	Mazada; Nosawa (16:42)	X	Draw (30:00)
Kondo Silver	Samurai; Hayashi (16:05)	Kondo; Silver (8:11)	Nakajima; Hijikata (12:34)	Kondo; Silver (12:19)	Draw (30:00)	X

Final
1	El Samurai and Kaz Hayashi	Pin
2	Katsuhiko Nakajima and Ryuji Hijikata	24:20

== 2009 ==
The 2009 Junior Tag League took place over eight shows between April 17 and 29.

Final standings
Wrestlers	Score
Kaz Hayashi and Shuji Kondo	6
Minoru and Toshizo	6
El Samurai and Masanobu Fuchi	5
Mazada and Nosawa Rongai	5
Hiroshi Yamato and Kai	4
Petey Williams and Phil Atlas	4

Results	Samurai Fuchi	Yamato Kai	Hayashi Kondo	Mazada Nosawa	Minoru Toshizo	Williams Atlas
Samurai Fuchi	X	Yamato; Kai (13:01)	Draw (30:00)	Samurai; Fuchi (6:22)	Minoru; Toshizo (13:48)	Samurai; Fuchi (9:25)
Yamato Kai	Yamato; Kai (13:01)	X	Hayashi; Kondo (13:35)	Mazada; Nosawa (14:52)	Yamato; Kai (20:00)	Williams; Atlas (8:52)
Hayashi Kondo	Draw (30:00)	Hayashi; Kondo (13:35)	X	Mazada; Nosawa (12:01)	Draw (30:00)	Hayashi; Kondo (14:42)
Mazada Nosawa	Samurai; Fuchi (6:22)	Mazada; Nosawa (14:52)	Mazada; Nosawa (12:01)	X	Draw (30:00)	Williams; Atlas (13:38)
Minoru Toshizo	Minoru; Toshizo (13:48)	Yamato; Kai (20:00)	Draw (30:00)	Draw (30:00)	X	Minoru; Toshizo (14:18)
Williams Atlas	Samurai; Fuchi (9:25)	Williams; Atlas (8:52)	Hayashi; Kondo (14:42)	Williams; Atlas (13:38)	Minoru; Toshizo (14:18)	X

Final
1	Kaz Hayashi and Shuji Kondo	Pin
2	Minoru and Toshizo	18:45

== 2010 ==
The 2010 Junior Tag League took place over seven shows between April 18 and May 2.

Final standings
Wrestlers	Score
Bushi and Super Crazy	5
Hiroshi Yamato and Shuji Kondo	5
Kai and Kaz Hayashi	4
Hate and Minoru	2
Mazada and Nosawa Rongai	2

Results	Bushi Crazy	Hate Minoru	Yamato Kondo	Kai Hayashi	Mazada Rongai
Bushi Crazy	X	Bushi; Crazy (13:52)	Draw (30:00)	Bushi; Crazy (13:41)	Mazada; Nosawa (12:32)
Hate Minoru	Bushi; Crazy (13:52)	X	Yamato; Kondo (13:04)	Kai; Hayashi (12:45)	Hate; Minoru (11:52)
Yamato Kondo	Draw (30:00)	Yamato; Kondo (13:04)	X	Kai; Hayashi (17:43)	Yamato; Kondo (17:47)
Kai Hayashi	Bushi; Crazy (13:41)	Kai; Hayashi (12:45)	Kai; Hayashi (17:43)	X	NC (14:38)
Mazada Rongai	Mazada; Nosawa (12:32)	Hate; Minoru (11:52)	Yamato; Kondo (17:47)	NC (14:38)	X

Final
1	Bushi and Super Crazy	Pin
2	Hiroshi Yamato and Shuji Kondo	19:44

== 2011 ==
The 2011 Junior Tag League took place over eight shows between April 17 and 30.

Final standings
Wrestlers	Score
Koji Kanemoto and Minoru	10
Kai and Kaz Hayashi	9
Hiroshi Yamato and Shuji Kondo	7
Bushi and Super Crazy	6
Hikaru Sato and Kikutaro	4
Masanobu Fuchi and Tsuyoshi Kikuchi	4
Mazada and Super Hate	2

Results	Bushi Crazy	Sato Kikutaro	Yamato Kondo	Kai Hayashi	Kanemoto Minoru	Fuchi Kikuchi	Mazada Hate
Bushi Crazy	X	Sato; Kikutaro (14:18)	Yamato; Kondo (17:07)	Kai; Hayashi (17:57)	Bushi; Crazy (15:51)	Bushi; Crazy (11:48)	Bushi; Crazy (9:33)
Sato Kikutaro	Sato; Kikutaro (14:18)	X	Yamato; Kondo (12:01)	Kai; Hayashi (13:39)	Kanemoto; Minoru (15:17)	Fuchi; Kikuchi (13:49)	Sato; Kikutaro (11:48)
Yamato Kondo	Yamato; Kondo (17:07)	Yamato; Kondo (12:01)	X	Draw (30:00)	Kanemoto; Minoru (13:49)	Yamato; Kondo (9:28)	Mazada; Hate (11:37)
Kai Hayashi	Kai; Hayashi (17:57)	Kai; Hayashi (13:39)	Draw (30:00)	X	Kanemoto; Minoru (21:17)	Kai; Hayashi (15:10)	Kai; Hayashi (13:54)
Kanemoto Minoru	Bushi; Crazy (15:51)	Kanemoto; Minoru (15:17)	Kanemoto; Minoru (13:49)	Kanemoto; Minoru (21:17)	X	Kanemoto; Minoru (15:21)	Kanemoto; Minoru (12:37)
Fuchi Kikuchi	Bushi; Crazy (11:48)	Fuchi; Kikuchi (13:49)	Yamato; Kondo (9:28)	Kai; Hayashi (15:10)	Kanemoto; Minoru (15:21)	X	Fuchi; Kikuchi (12:54)
Mazada Hate	Bushi; Crazy (9:33)	Sato; Kikutaro (11:48)	Mazada; Hate (11:37)	Kai; Hayashi (13:54)	Kanemoto; Minoru (12:37)	Fuchi; Kikuchi (12:54)	X

Final
1	Koji Kanemoto and Minoru	Pin
2	Kai and Kaz Hayashi	30:45

== 2012 ==
The 2012 Junior Tag League took place over six shows between April 1 and 14. The winners of the tournament, Kaz Hayashi and Shuji Kondo, went on to unsuccessfully challenge Daisuke Sekimoto and Yuji Okabayashi for the All Asia Tag Team Championship on May 27.

Final standings
Wrestlers	Score
Bushi and Sushi	6
Kaz Hayashi and Shuji Kondo	6
Hikaru Sato and Hiroshi Yamato	5
Koji Kanemoto and Minoru Tanaka	5
Gillette and Kai	4
Kenny Omega and Michael Nakazawa	4

Results	Bushi Sushi	Gillette Kai	Sato Yamato	Hayashi Kondo	Omega Nakazawa	Kanemoto Tanaka
Bushi Sushi	X	Bushi; Sushi (14:20)	Bushi; Sushi (13:22)	Bushi; Sushi (14:20)	Omega; Nakazawa (13:48)	Kanemoto; Tanaka (15:34)
Gillette Kai	Bushi; Sushi (14:20)	X	Sato; Yamato (15:42)	Hayashi; Kondo (14:52)	Gillette; Kai (11:50)	Gillette; Kai (17:54)
Sato Yamato	Bushi; Sushi (13:22)	Sato; Yamato (15:42)	X	Sato; Yamato (17:17)	Omega; Nakazawa (12:51)	Draw (30:00)
Hayashi Kondo	Bushi; Sushi (14:20)	Hayashi; Kondo (14:52)	Sato; Yamato (17:17)	X	Hayashi; Kondo (12:32)	Hayashi; Kondo (15:01)
Omega Nakazawa	Omega; Nakazawa (13:48)	Gillette; Kai (11:50)	Omega; Nakazawa (12:51)	Hayashi; Kondo (12:32)	X	Kanemoto; Tanaka (15:54)
Kanemoto Tanaka	Kanemoto; Tanaka (15:34)	Gillette; Kai (17:54)	Draw (30:00)	Hayashi; Kondo (15:01)	Kanemoto; Tanaka (15:54)	X

Final
1	Bushi and Sushi	Pin
2	Kaz Hayashi and Shuji Kondo	16:10

== 2013 ==
In 2013, All Japan Pro Wrestling renamed the Junior Tag League the "Junior Hyper Tag League", following in the footsteps of the singles Junior League, which had been renamed "Junior Hyper League" the previous summer. The tournament was held over six shows between March 30 and April 7, 2013. The winners of the tournament, Atsushi Aoki and Kotaro Suzuki, went on to defeat Koji Kanemoto and Minoru Tanaka for the All Asia Tag Team Championship on April 25.

Final standings
Wrestlers	Score
Atsushi Aoki and Kotaro Suzuki	7
Hikaru Sato and Hiroshi Yamato	6
Koji Kanemoto and Minoru Tanaka	5
Andy Wu and Sushi	4
Kaz Hayashi and Shuji Kondo	4
Masanobu Fuchi and Yoshinobu Kanemaru	4

Results	Wu Sushi	Aoki Suzuki	Sato Yamato	Hayashi Kondo	Kanemoto Tanaka	Fuchi Kanemaru
Wu Sushi	X	Aoki; Suzuki (8:34)	Wu; Sushi (11:53)	Hayashi; Kondo (11:15)	Kanemoto; Tanaka (11:01)	Wu; Sushi (14:15)
Aoki Suzuki	Aoki; Suzuki (8:34)	X	Sato; Yamato (17:20)	Aoki; Kondo (9:41)	Draw (30:00)	Aoki; Suzuki (20:17)
Sato Yamato	Wu; Sushi (11:53)	Sato; Yamato (17:20)	X	Sato; Yamato (16:50)	Sato; Yamato (17:41)	Fuchi; Kanemaru (17:34)
Hayashi Kondo	Hayashi; Kondo (11:15)	Aoki; Kondo (9:41)	Sato; Yamato (16:50)	X	Hayashi; Kondo (20:25)	Fuchi; Kanemaru (18:53)
Kanemoto Tanaka	Kanemoto; Tanaka (11:01)	Draw (30:00)	Sato; Yamato (17:41)	Hayashi; Kondo (20:25)	X	Kanemoto; Tanaka (19:55)
Fuchi Kanemaru	Wu; Sushi (14:15)	Aoki; Suzuki (20:17)	Fuchi; Kanemaru (17:34)	Fuchi; Kanemaru (18:53)	Kanemoto; Tanaka (19:55)	X

Final
1	Atsushi Aoki and Kotaro Suzuki	Pin
2	Hikaru Sato and Hiroshi Yamato	23:15

== 2014 ==
In 2014, All Japan Pro Wrestling again renamed the tournament the "Jr. Tag Battle of Glory", following in the footsteps of the singles Junior League, which had been renamed "Jr. Battle of Glory" the previous February. The tournament was held over eight shows between October 8 and 22, 2014. The winners of the tournament earned a spot in the 2014 World's Strongest Tag Determination League.

Final standings
Wrestlers	Score
Último Dragón and Yoshinobu Kanemaru	6
Atsushi Aoki and Hikaru Sato	5
Keisuke Ishii and Soma Takao	5
Ryuji Hijikata and Sushi	4
Kotaro Suzuki and Yohei Nakajima	0

Results	Aoki Sato	Ishii Takao	Suzuki Nakajima	Hijikata Sushi	Dragón Kanemaru
Aoki Sato	X	Draw (30:00)	Aoki; Sato (17:36)	Aoki; Sato (17:43)	Dragón; Kanemaru (12:04)
Ishii Takao	Draw (30:00)	X	Ishii; Takao (7:59)	Ishii; Takao (14:54)	Dragón; Kanemaru (17:04)
Suzuki Nakajima	Aoki; Sato (17:36)	Ishii; Takao (7:59)	X	Hijikata; Sushi (14:01)	Dragón; Kanemaru (17:24)
Hijikata Sushi	Aoki; Sato (17:43)	Ishii; Takao (14:54)	Hijikata; Sushi (14:01)	X	Hijikata; Sushi (14:06)
Dragón Kanemaru	Dragón; Kanemaru (12:04)	Dragón; Kanemaru (17:04)	Dragón; Kanemaru (17:24)	Hijikata; Sushi (14:06)	X

Playoff			Final
			1	Último Dragón and Yoshinobu Kanemaru	Sub
			2	Atsushi Aoki and Hikaru Sato	22:07
2	Atsushi Aoki and Hikaru Sato	Sub	2	Atsushi Aoki and Hikaru Sato	22:07
2	Keisuke Ishii and Soma Takao	7:08

== 2015 ==
The 2015 Jr. Tag Battle of Glory took place over eight shows between October 12 and 23. Último Dragón and Yoshinobu Kanemaru entered the tournament as the reigning All Asia Tag Team Champions, but relinquished the title after losing to Isami Kodaka and Yuko Miyamoto in their opening match.

Final standings
Wrestlers	Score
Atsushi Aoki and Hikaru Sato	6
Isami Kodaka and Yuko Miyamoto	5
Último Dragón and Yoshinobu Kanemaru	4
Kotaro Suzuki and Yohei Nakajima	3
Manjimaru and Takeshi Minamino	2

Results	Aoki Sato	Kodaka Miyamoto	Suzuki Nakajima	Manjimaru Minamino	Dragón Kanemaru
Aoki Sato	X	Aoki; Sato (21:52)	Aoki; Sato (14:33)	Manjimaru; Minamino (7:55)	Aoki; Sato (18:24)
Kodaka Miyamoto	Aoki; Sato (21:52)	X	Draw (30:00)	Kodaka; Miyamoto (14:10)	Kodaka; Miyamoto (23:36)
Suzuki Nakajima	Aoki; Sato (14:33)	Draw (30:00)	X	Suzuki; Nakajima (11:36)	Dragón; Kanemaru (18:11)
Manjimaru Minamino	Manjimaru; Minamino (7:55)	Kodaka; Miyamoto (14:10)	Suzuki; Nakajima (11:36)	X	Dragón; Kanemaru (14:53)
Dragón Kanemaru	Aoki; Sato (18:24)	Kodaka; Miyamoto (23:36)	Dragón; Kanemaru (18:11)	Dragón; Kanemaru (14:53)	X

== 2016 ==
The 2016 Jr. Tag Battle of Glory took place over five shows between November 12 and 17.

Final standings
Wrestlers	Score
Atsushi Aoki and Hikaru Sato	5
Soma Takao and Yuma Aoyagi	5
Black Tiger V and Takeshi Minamino	4
Daichi Kazato and Kazuhiro Tamura	4
Fuminori Abe and Koji Iwamoto	2

Results	Aoki Sato	Tiger Minamino	Kazato Tamura	Abe Iwamoto	Takao Aoyagi
Aoki Sato	X	Aoki; Sato (3:11)	Kazato; Tamura (8:24)	Aoki; Sato (14:07)	Draw (20:00)
Tiger Minamino	Aoki; Sato (3:11)	X	Kazato; Tamura (7:14)	Tiger; Minamino (11:17)	Tiger; Minamino (10:46)
Kazato Tamura	Kazato; Tamura (8:24)	Kazato; Tamura (7:14)	X	Abe; Iwamoto (7:44)	Takao; Aoyagi (5:09)
Abe Iwamoto	Aoki; Sato (14:07)	Tiger; Minamino (11:17)	Abe; Iwamoto (7:44)	X	Takao; Aoyagi (8:19)
Takao Aoyagi	Draw (20:00)	Tiger; Minamino (10:46)	Takao; Aoyagi (5:09)	Takao; Aoyagi (8:19)	X

Playoff
Atsushi Aoki and Hikaru Sato	Pin
Soma Takao and Yuma Aoyagi	16:15

== 2017 ==
The 2017 Jr. Tag Battle of Glory took place over five shows between November 3 and 9.

Final standings
Wrestlers	Score
Atsushi Maruyama and Masashi Takeda	6
Black Spider VII and Black Tiger VII	4
Atsushi Aoki and Hikaru Sato	4
Keiichi Sato and Kotaro Suzuki	4
Koji Iwamoto and Yusuke Okada	2

Results	Aoki H. Sato	Maruyama Takeda	Spider Tiger	K. Sato Suzuki	Iwamoto Okada
Aoki H. Sato	X	Maruyama; Takeda (14:45)	Spider; Tiger (9:53)	Aoki; H.Sato (11:12)	Aoki; H.Sato (11:15)
Maruyama Takeda	Maruyama; Takeda (14:45)	X	Maruyama; Takeda (7:13)	K.Sato; Suzuki (8:33)	Maruyama; Takeda (10:41)
Spider Tiger	Spider; Tiger (9:53)	Maruyama; Takeda (7:13)	X	Spider; Tiger (5:37)	Iwamoto; Okada (4:39)
K. Sato Suzuki	Aoki; H.Sato (11:12)	K.Sato; Suzuki (8:33)	Spider; Tiger (5:37)	X	K.Sato; Suzuki (15:52)
Iwamoto Okada	Aoki; H.Sato (11:15)	Maruyama; Takeda (10:41)	Iwamoto; Okada (4:39)	K.Sato; Suzuki (15:52)	X

== 2018 ==
The 2018 Junior Tag League took place over ten shows between August 3 and 25.

Final standings
Wrestlers	Score
Koji Iwamoto and Tajiri	8
Atsushi Aoki and Hikaru Sato	6
Masaaki Mochizuki and Shun Skywalker	6
Shuji Kondo and Kotaro Suzuki	6
Kaji Tomato and Shiori Asahi	6
Atsushi Maruyama and Masashi Takeda	6
Black Menso~re and Black Tiger VII	4

Results	Iwamoto Tajiri	Aoki Sato	Mochizuki Skywalker	Kondo Suzuki	Tomato Asahi	Maruyama Takeda	Menso Tiger
Iwamoto Tajiri	X	Iwamoto; Tajiri (19:32)	Iwamoto; Tajiri (8:19)	Kondo; Suzuki (5:07)	Tamato; Asahi (11:24)	Iwamoto; Tajiri (8:57)	Iwamoto; Tajiri (10:17)
Aoki Sato	Iwamoto; Tajiri (19:32)	X	Mochizuki; Skywalker (13:53)	Kondo; Suzuki (17:55)	Aoki; Sato (14:26)	Aoki; Sato (15:30)	Menso; Tiger (12:26)
Mochizuki Skywalker	Iwamoto; Tajiri (8:19)	Mochizuki; Skywalker (13:53)	X	Kondo; Suzuki (15:25)	Tamato; Asahi (8:12)	Mochizuki; Skywalker (9:31)	Mochizuki; Skywalker (8:58)
Kondo Suzuki	Kondo; Suzuki (5:07)	Kondo; Suzuki (17:55)	Kondo; Suzuki (15:25)	X	Kondo; Suzuki (15:30)	Maruyama; Takeda (17:18)	Menso; Tiger (6:06)
Tomato Asahi	Tamato; Asahi (11:24)	Aoki; Sato (14:26)	Tamato; Asahi (8:12)	Kondo; Suzuki (15:30)	X	Maruyama; Takeda (8:05)	Tamato; Asahi (9:28)
Maruyama Takeda	Iwamoto; Tajiri (8:57)	Aoki; Sato (15:30)	Mochizuki; Skywalker (9:31)	Kondo; Suzuki (15:30)	Maruyama; Takeda (8:05)	X	Maruyama; Takeda (9:19)
Menso Tiger	Iwamoto; Tajiri (10:17)	Menso; Tiger (12:26)	Mochizuki; Skywalker (8:58)	Menso; Tiger (6:06)	Tamato; Asahi (9:28)	Maruyama; Takeda (9:19)	X

Final
1	Koji Iwamoto and Tajiri	Pin
2	Atsushi Aoki and Hikaru Sato	19:32

== 2019 ==
The 2019 Junior Tag League took place over eight shows between July 17 and 28. Atsushi Aoki was announced to team with Hikaru Sato, while Yusuke Okada was supposed to team with Akira Francesco. After Aoki was killed in a motorcycle accident on June 3, Okada eventually requested to replace him as Sato's partner which was later granted while Hokuto Omori replaced Okada as Francesco's partner.

Final standings
Wrestlers	Score
Kagetora and Yosuke♥Santa Maria	7
Hikaru Sato and Yusuke Okada	6
Atsushi Maruyama and Black Menso～re	5
Banana Senga and Tsutomu Oosugi	5
Keiichi Sato and Koji Iwamoto	4
Francesco Akira and Hokuto Omori	3

Results	Akira Omori	Iwamoto Sato	Kagetora Santa Maria	Maruyama Menso	Sato Okada	Senga Oosugi
Akira Omori	X	Iwamoto; Sato (10:05)	Draw (20:00)	Draw (20:00)	Sato; Okada (11:00)	Draw (20:00)
Iwamoto Sato	Iwamoto; Sato (10:05)	X	Kagetora; Santa Maria (9:03)	Iwamoto; Sato (9:06)	Sato; Okada (17:43)	Senga; Oosugi (9:54)
Kagetora Santa Maria	Draw (20:00)	Kagetora; Santa Maria (9:03)	X	Maruayama; Menso (10:48)	Kagetora; Santa Maria (14:18)	Kagetora; Santa Maria (10:29)
Maruyama Menso	Draw (20:00)	Iwamoto; Sato (9:06)	Maruayama; Menso (10:48)	X	Sato; Okada (15:50)	Maruayama; Menso (11:05)
Sato Okada	Sato; Okada (11:00)	Sato; Okada (17:43)	Kagetora; Santa Maria (14:18)	Sato; Okada (15:50)	X	Senga; Oosugi (17:23)
Senga Oosugi	Draw (20:00)	Senga; Oosugi (9:54)	Kagetora; Santa Maria (10:29)	Maruayama; Menso (11:05)	Senga; Oosugi (17:23)	X

Final
1	Kagetora and Yosuke♥Santa Maria	22:05
2	Hikaru Sato and Yusuke Okada	Sub

== 2020 ==
The 2020 Jr. Tag Battle of Glory took place on December 27, in a self produced show by Hikaru Sato.

First round
Evolution (Dan Tamura and Hikaru Sato)	Pin
Yu Iizuka and Tetsuya Izuchi	7:31
Enfants Terribles (Hokuto Omori and Yusuke Kodama)	Sub
Purple Haze (Izanagi and Masashi Takeda)	5:08
Jin (Koji Iwamoto and Fuminori Abe)	Pin
Francesco Akira and Takayuki Ueki	7:15
Atsuki Aoyagi and Rising Hayato	Pin
Black Menso~re and SUSHI	9:09

Semifinals
Evolution (Dan Tamura and Hikaru Sato)	Pin
Enfants Terribles (Hokuto Omori and Yusuke Kodama)	5:09
Jin (Koji Iwamoto and Fuminori Abe)	Sub
Atsuki Aoyagi and Rising HAYATO (Note: Atsuki Aoyagi and Rising HAYATO won based on a weight decision.)	10:00

Final
Evolution (Dan Tamura and Hikaru Sato)	Pin
Atsuki Aoyagi and Rising HAYATO	31:58

== 2021 ==
The 2021 Jr. Tag Battle of Glory was a one-day tournament and took place on December 26.

First round
Evolution (Dan Tamura and Hikaru Sato)	Sub
Black Menso~Re and Hiroshi Yamato	11:30
Atsuki Aoyagi and Yu Iizuka	Pin
Takayuki Ueki and Seigo Tachibana	9:41
Total Eclipse (Hokuto Omori and Yusuke Kodama)	Pin
Aijin Tag (Takato Nakano and Masato Kamino)	8:51
Sugi and Raicho	Pin
Purple Haze (Izanagi and Masashi Takeda)	9:54

Semifinals
Evolution (Dan Tamura and Hikaru Sato)	Pin
Atsuki Aoyagi and Yu Iizuka	10:53
Total Eclipse (Hokuto Omori and Yusuke Kodama)	Pin
Sugi and Raicho	8:25

Final
Evolution (Dan Tamura and Hikaru Sato)	Pin
Total Eclipse (Hokuto Omori and Yusuke Kodama)	28:18

== 2023 ==
The 2023 Junior Tag League took place over eight shows between April 8 and May 4 alongside Champions carnival 2023

Final standings
Wrestlers	Score
Kaito Ishida and Kotaro Suzuki	5
Atsuki Aoyagi and Rising Hayato	5
Naoki Tanizaki and Naruki Doi	4
Dan Tamura and Hikaru Sato	4
Oji Shiiba and Ryo Inoue	2

Results	Aoyagi Hayato	Ishida Suzuki	Tamura Sato	Tanizaki Doi	Shiiba Inoue
Aoyagi Hayato	X	Draw (15:00)	Tamura; Sato (11:19)	Aoyagi; Hayato (7:08)	Aoyagi; Hayato (7:36)
Ishida Suzuki	Draw (15:00)	X	Tamura; Sato (11:09)	Ishida; Suzuki (8:56)	Ishida; Suzuki (6:32)
Tamura Sato	Tamura; Sato (11:19)	Tamura; Sato (11:09)	X	Tanizaki; Doi (8:38)	Shiiba; Inoue (7:18)
Tanizaki Doi	Aoyagi; Hayato (7:08)	Ishida; Suzuki (8:56)	Tanizaki; Doi (8:38)	X	Tanizaki; Doi (5:24)
Shiiba Inoue	Aoyagi; Hayato (7:36)	Ishida; Suzuki (6:32)	Shiiba; Inoue (7:18)	Tanizaki; Doi (5:24)	X

Final
1	Kaito Ishida and Kotaro Suzuki	Pin
2	Atsuki Aoyagi and Rising Hayato	21:48

== 2026 ==
The 2026 Jr. Tag Battle of Glory, held under the name "Zennichi Jr. Tag Team Festival", was held as an eight-team single-elimination tournament across four events between February 15 and March 20.

First round February 15 and 23
Ryo Inoue and Mochizuki Jr.	Pin
Saito Brothers ("Mr. Saito" Naruki Doi and Señor Saito)	17:18
Dan Tamura and Hikaru Sato	Pin
Kota Sekifuda and Toshiyuki Sakuda	15:48
Atsuki Aoyagi and Rising Hayato	Pin
Baka no Jidai (Fuminori Abe and Seigo Tachibana)	23:52
Musashi and Shota Kofuji	15:52
Seiki Yoshioka and Yuya Susumu	Pin

Semifinals; March 15
Ryo Inoue and Mochizuki Jr.	Pin
Dan Tamura and Hikaru Sato	15:53
Atsuki Aoyagi and Rising Hayato	18:34
Seiki Yoshioka and Yuya Susumu	Pin

Final; March 20
Ryo Inoue and Mochizuki Jr.	25:49
Atsuki Aoyagi and Rising Hayato	Pin

== See also ==
- AJPW Junior League
- Nippon TV Cup Jr. Heavyweight Tag League
- Super Junior Tag Tournament
