= Chiba Six Man Tag Team Championship =

Japanese professional wrestling tag team championship

Chiba 6-Man Tag Team Championship

Details
- Promotion: Active Advance Pro Wrestling
- Date established: April 30, 2011
- Current champion: Vacant
- Date won: 2020
Statistics
- First champions: Hiro Tonai, Shiori Asahi and Yuki Sato
- Most reigns: Rasse, Yapper Man I and Yapper Man II (3 reigns)
- Longest reign: Ayumu Honda, Kyu Mogami and Taishi Takizawa (2,108+ days)
- Shortest reign: Brahman Kei, Brahman Shu and The Great Sasuke (1 day)
- Oldest champion: Ricky Fuji (45 years, 355 days)
- Heaviest champion: Yuji Hino (264 lb)
- Lightest champion: Bambi (147 lb)

The Chiba 6-Man Tag Team Championship (Japanese: 千葉6人タッグ王座, Hepburn: Chiba Roku-nin Taggu Ōza) is a professional wrestling tag team championship promoted by the Japanese promotion Active Advance Pro Wrestling (2AW). It was previously promoted by Kaientai Dojo (K-Dojo), before the promotion changed its name to 2AW in 2019, following the departure of K-Dojo founder Taka Michinoku. The championship is contested for by teams of three wrestlers and like most professional wrestling championships, the title is won as a result of a match with a predetermined outcome.

The titles are currently inactive.

== Title history ==
As of October 18, 2025, there have been 18 reigns, shared among 15 teams composed of 33 different champions and two vacancies. The current champions are Ayumu Honda, Kyu Mogami and Taishi Takizawa who are in their first reign as a tag team.

Key
No.	Overall reign number
Reign	Reign number for the specific team—reign numbers for the individuals are in parentheses, if different
Days	Number of days held
Defenses	Number of successful defenses
N/A	Unknown information
+	Current reign is changing daily

No.	Champion	Championship change			Reign statistics			Notes	Ref.
No.	Champion	Date	Event	Location	Reign	Days	Defenses	Notes	Ref.
Kaientai Dojo
1	Little Galaxy (Hiro Tonai, Shiori Asahi and Yuki Sato)	April 30, 2011	Club-K Tour In Osaka	Chiba, Japan	1	140	2	Defeated Kaji Tomato, Marines Mask and Taishi Takizawa to become the inaugural champions.	
2	Bambi, Ricky Fuji and Yuji Hino	September 17, 2011	Live event	Chiba, Japan	1	92	3		
3	Silence (Daigoro Kashiwa, Kaji Tomato and Marines Mask)	December 18, 2011	K-Special Chiba BlueField Final Show	Chiba, Japan	1	97	3		
4	Isami Kodaka, Kengo Mashimo and Taka Michinoku	March 24, 2012	Live event	Chiba, Japan	1	63	0		
—	Vacated	May 26, 2012	—	—	—	—	—		
5	Satoshi, Shoichi Uchida and Tadanobu Fujisawa	June 17, 2012	Live event	Osaka, Japan	1	N/A	0	Defeated Hiroki, Boso Boy Raito and Ryuichi Sekine to win the vacant title. The length of this reign is uncertain.	
—	Deactivated	N/A	—	—	—	—	—	The titles were abandoned and deactivated under unknown circumstances somewhere between the end of 2012 and the beginning of 2013.	
6	Happy Big Circus (Note: ハッピー大サーカス, Happī Dai Sākasu) (Dinosaur Takuma, Kotaro Yoshino and Yuma)	April 22, 2018	16th Anniversary Club-K Super Evolution 16	Tokyo, Japan	1	98	2	Defeated Aki Shizuku, Bambi & Makoto, Go Asakawa, Kaji Tomato & Marines Mask, Kelly Sixx, DSK & One Man Kru, and Carbell Ito, Ricky Fuji & Yoshihiro Horaguchi in a five-way gauntlet match to win the reactivated title.	
7	Magatsuki (Note: 凶月, Magatsuki) (Ayumu Honda, Kyu Mogami and Yuki Sato)	July 29, 2018	Grand Slam in TKP Garden City Chiba	Chiba, Japan	1 (1, 1, 2	148	3		
8	Happy Big Circus (Chojin Yusha G Valion, Dinosaur Takuma and Kotaro Yoshino)	December 24, 2018	K-Special Final Show of the Year	Chiba, Japan	1 (1, 2, 2)	48	0		
9	Ayato Yoshida, Tank Nagai and Tatsuya Hanami	February 10, 2019	Grand Slam in Blue Field	Chiba, Japan	1	130	4		
Active Advance Pro Wrestling
10	Rasse, Yapper Man #1 and Yapper Man #2	June 20, 2019	Live event	Tokyo, Japan	1	23	1		
11	Mu no Taiyo (Note: ムーの太陽, Mū no Taiyō) (Brahman Kei, Brahman Shu and The Great Sasuke)	July 13, 2019	Michinoku Pro Sunzen Shakuma Day 1	Yahaba, Japan	1	1	0	This was a Michinoku Pro Wrestling event	
12	Rasse, Yapper Man #1 and Yapper Man #2	July 14, 2019	Michinoku Pro Sunzen Shakuma Day 2	Sendai, Japan	2	35	1	This was a Michinoku Pro Wrestling event	
13	Mu no Taiyo (Brahman Kei, Brahman Shu and The Great Sasuke)	August 18, 2019	Michinoku Pro Summer Vacation Series 2019 Day 7	Tsuruoka, Japan	2	6	0	This was a Michinoku Pro Wrestling event	
14	Rasse, Yapper Man #1 and Yapper Man #2	August 24, 2019	Michinoku Pro Michinoku 2019 Tokyo Conference Vol. 5	Tokyo, Japan	3	8	0	This was a Michinoku Pro Wrestling event	
15	Tempest (Ayumu Honda, Kunio Toshima and Kyu Mogami)	September 1, 2019	Grand Slam in Korakuen Hall	Tokyo, Japan	1 (2, 1, 2)	40	0		
16	Chango, Dinosaur Takuma and Kaji Tomato	October 11, 2019	Grand Slam in Shin-Kiba	Tokyo, Japan	1 (1, 3, 2)	30	0		
17	Ayato Yoshida, Kotaro Yoshino and Tank Nagai	November 10, 2019	Grand Slam in TKP Garden City Chiba	Chiba, Japan	1 (2, 3, 2)	61	1		
18	Tempest (Ayumu Honda, Kyu Mogami and Taishi Takizawa)	January 10, 2020	Grand Slam in Shin-Kiba	Tokyo, Japan	1 (3, 3, 1)	N/A	0		
—	Vacated	2020	—	—	—	—	—	The titles have been inactive since late 2020 under unknown circumstances.	

=== Combined reigns ===
†	Indicates the current champion
¤	The exact length of at least one title reign is uncertain

Rank	Team	No. of reigns	Combined defenses	Combined days
1	Magatsuki (Ayumu Honda, Kyu Mogami and Yuki Sato)	1	3	148
2	Little Galaxy (Hiro Tonai, Shiori Asahi and Yuki Sato)	1	2	140
3	Ayato Yoshida, Tank Nagai and Tatsuya Hanami	1	4	130
4	Dinosaur Takuma, Kotaro Yoshino and Yuma	1	2	98
5	Silence (Daigoro Kashiwa, Kaji Tomato and Marines Mask)	1	3	97
6	Bambi, Ricky Fuji and Yuji Hino	1	3	92
7	Rasse, Yapper Man I and Yapper Man II	3	2	74
8	Isami Kodaka, Kengo Mashimo and Taka Michinoku	1	0	63
9	Ayato Yoshida, Kotaro Yoshino and Tank Nagai	1	1	61
10	Chojin Yusha G Valion, Dinosaur Takuma and Kotaro Yoshino	1	0	48
11	Ayumu Honda, Kunio Toshima and Kyu Mogami	1	0	40
12	Chango, Dinosaur Takuma and Kaji Tomato	1	0	30
13	Muno Taiyo (Brahman Kei, Brahman Shu and The Great Sasuke)	2	0	7
14	Tempest (Ayumu Honda, Kyu Mogami and Taishi Takizawa)	1	0	¤N/A
14	Satoshi, Shoichi Uchida and Tadanobu Fujisawa	1	0	¤N/A

=== By wrestler ===
Rank	Wrestler	No. of reigns	Combined defenses	Combined days
1	Yuki Sato	2	5	288
2	Ayato Yoshida	2	5	191
2	Tank Nagai	2	5	191
4	Ayumu Honda	3	3	¤178
4	Kyu Mogami	3	3	¤178
6	Dinosaur Takuma	3	2	176
7	Hiro Tonai	1	2	140
7	Shiori Asahi	1	2	140
9	Tatsuya Hanami	1	4	130
10	Kaji Tomato	2	3	127
11	Kotaro Yoshino	3	3	109
12	Yuma	1	2	98
13	Marines Mask	1	3	97
14	Bambi	1	3	92
14	Ricky Fuji	1	3	92
14	Yuji Hino	1	3	92
17	Rasse	3	2	74
17	Yapper Man I	3	2	74
17	Yapper Man II	3	2	74
20	Isami Kodaka	1	0	63
20	Kengo Mashimo	1	0	63
20	Taka Michinoku	1	0	63
23	Chojin Yusha G Valion	1	0	48
24	Kunio Toshima	1	0	40
25	Chango	1	0	30
26	Brahman Kei	2	0	7
26	Brahman Shu	2	0	7
26	The Great Sasuke	2	0	7
29	Satoshi	1	0	¤N/A
29	Shoichi Uchida	1	0	¤N/A
29	Tadanobu Fujisawa	1	0	¤N/A
29	Taishi Takizawa	1	0	¤N/A
