= Seigo Tachibana =

Japanese professional wrestler

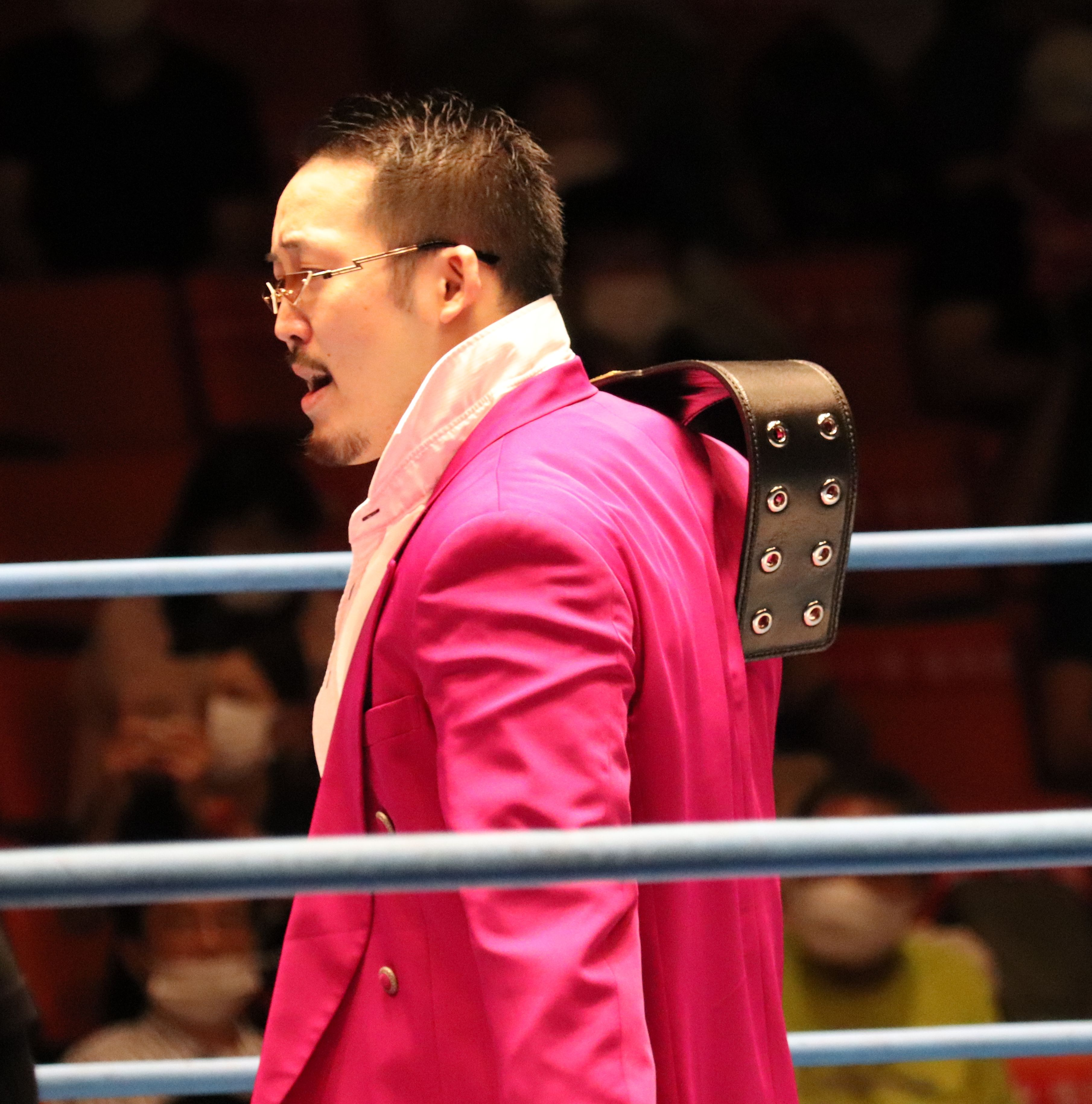
- Tachibana in August 2021

Personal information
- Born: August 1, 1997 (age 29) Tokyo, Japan

Professional wrestling career
- Ring names: Masao Hanabatake; O Hanabatakemasa; Seigo Tachibana
- Billed height: 170 cm (5 ft 7 in)
- Billed weight: 90 kg (198 lb)
- Trained by: Shotaro Ashino; Shuji Kondo; Kaz Hayashi; Hiroshi Yamato
- Debut: 2016

Seigo Tachibana (立花 誠吾, Tachibana Seigo) is a Japanese professional wrestler currently working as a freelancer – predominantly for All Japan Pro Wrestling (AJPW). He is best known for his tenure with the Japanese promotions Wrestle-1 and where he also appeared under the ring names Masao Hanabatake (花畑 正男, Hanabatake Masao) and O Hanabatakemasa (花畑正 男, Hanabatakemasa O).

== Professional wrestling career ==
=== Wrestle-1 (2016–2020) ===
Tachibana made his professional wrestling debut in Wrestle-1's W-1 Pro-Wrestling Training Academy 1st Graduation Class event on March 30, 2016, where he fell short to one of his coaches, Kaz Hayashi. He competed in the promotion's various signature events. One of them is the Wrestle-1 Grand Prix, where he made his only appearance at the 2019 edition, in which he fell short to Shotaro Ashino in the first rounds. Tachibana competed at W-1 WRESTLE-1 Tour Trans Magic, the last ever event hosted by Wrestle-1 on April 1, 2020, before its closure where he took part in a 31-man battle royal won by Manabu Soya and also featuring many of the promotion's roster figures such as El Lindaman, Cima, El Hijo del Pantera, Yasufumi Nakanoue, T-Hawk, Mazada and others.

=== All Japan Pro Wrestling (2020–present) ===
After Wrestle-1's closure in early 2020, Tachibana began competing for All Japan Pro Wrestling. He made his debut in the promotion at AJPW All Japan Pro Wrestling Wednesday Special on May 27, 2020, where he unsuccessfully challenged Yoshitatsu for the Gaora TV Championship. He continued challenging for various titles such as at AJPW All Japan Pro Wrestling Broadcast 2020 #7 from June 25, where he teamed up with Yoshitatsu to unsuccessfully challenge Yankee Two Kenju (Isami Kodaka and Yuko Miyamoto) for the All Asia Tag Team Championship. He captured the AJPW TV Six-Man Tag Team Championship at AJPW Summer Action Series 2021 on July 22 alongside Yoshitatsu and Carbell Ito by defeating Total Eclipse (Tajiri, Yusuke Kodama and Hokuto Omori).

Tachibana also participated in various of the promotion's signature events. One of them is the AJPW Junior Tag League, where he made his first appearance at the 2021 edition by teaming up with Takaayuki Ueki in a losing effort against Atsuki Aoyagi and Yu Iizuka in the first round matches. As for the Ōdō Tournament, he debuted in the 2021 edition where he fell short to Zeus in the first rounds. In the World's Strongest Tag Determination League, he firstly competed in the 2021 edition by teaming up with Yoshitatsu, placing themselves in the Block C, failing to score any points after going against the teams of Kengo Mashimo and Kazma Sakamoto, Shuji Ishikawa and Kohei Sato, and Mitsuya Nagai and Leona.

=== DDT Pro Wrestling (2020) ===
Tachibana also stepped into DDT Pro Wrestling for a short period of time. He made his first appearance on the first night of the Wrestle Peter Pan 2020 from June 6 where he fell short to Nobuhiro Shimatani. He participated in the 2020 edition of the King of DDT Tournament where he fell short to Toru Owashi on the first night from August 8. On the second night, Tachibana competed in a 13-man battle royal for a second chance to re-enter the tournament, match won by Tetsuya Endo and also involving Antonio Honda, Chris Brookes, Yukio Naya, Tomomitsu Matsunaga, Mad Paulie and others. At DDT Get Alive 2020 on September 7, Tachibana teamed up with Danshoku Dino and Yoshiko to unsuccessfully challenge Eruption (Kazusada Higuchi, Saki Akai and Yukio Sakaguchi) for the KO-D 6-Man Tag Team Championship.

== Championships and accomplishments ==
- All Japan Pro Wrestling
  - Gaora TV Championship (2 times)
  - World Junior Heavyweight Championship (1 time)
  - All Asia Tag Team Championship (1 time) – with Yusuke Kodama
  - AJPW TV Six-Man Tag Team Championship (3 times) – with Yoshitatsu and Takayuki Ueki (1), Yoshitatsu and Carbell Ito (1), Kuma Arashi and Ryuki Honda (1)
  - Junior Battle of Glory (2026)
- Gleat
  - G-Infinity Championship (1 time) – with Jiro Kuroshio
- Pro Wrestling Up Town
  - Up Town Championship (1 time, current)
- Kuroshio Tokyo Japan Produce
  - Smash Championship (1 time, current)
- Pro Wrestling Illustrated
  - Ranked No. 295 of the top 500 singles wrestlers in the PWI 500 in 2026
- Wrestle-1
  - Wrestle-1 Result Championship (1 time)
  - Wrestle-1 Tag Team Championship (1 time) – with Shuji Kondo
  - UWA World Trios Championship (1 time) – with Shotaro Ashino and Yusuke Kodama
