= AJPW TV Six-Man Tag Team Championship =

Professional wrestling tag team championship

Details
- Promotion: All Japan Pro Wrestling
- Date established: December 13, 2020
- Current champions: Go Shiozaki, Yasutaka Yano and Yuma Aoyagi
- Date won: October 27, 2026
Statistics
- First champions: Black Menso-re, Carbell Ito and Takao Omori
- Most reigns: As a team (2 reigns): Takao Omori, Black Menso-re and Carbell Ito/ATM As an individual (3 reigns): Carbell Ito; Hokuto Omori; Kuma Arashi; Seigo Tachibana
- Longest reign: Suwama, Mayumi Ozaki and Maya Yukihi (271 days)
- Shortest reign: Hideki Suzuki, Masayuki Kono and Shota Kofuji (15 days)
- Oldest champion: Mayumi Ozaki (54 years, 11 months and 23 days)
- Youngest champion: Hideki Okatani (22 years, 9 months and 15 days)
- Heaviest champion: Cyrus (348 lb)
- Lightest champion: Saki Akai (117 lb)

The AJPW TV Six-Man Tag Team Championship (Japanese: 全日本プロレスTV認定6人タッグ王座, Hepburn: Zen Nihon Puroresu Tī Bui Nintei Roku-nin Taggu Ōza) is a professional wrestling six-man tag team championship owned by the All Japan Pro Wrestling (AJPW) promotion. The championship was introduced on December 13, 2020, when Black Menso-re, Carbell Ito and Takao Omori defeated Daimonji So, Revlon and Ryouji Sai to become the inaugural champions.

Like most professional wrestling championships, the title is won as a result of a scripted match. There have been a total of fifteen reigns shared between fourteen different teams consisting of thirty distinctive champions. The current champions are Go Shiozaki, Yasutaka Yano and Yuma Aoyagi who are in their first reign as a team.

== Title history ==
Key
No.	Overall reign number
Reign	Reign number for the specific team—reign numbers for the individuals are in parentheses, if different
Days	Number of days held
Defenses	Number of successful defenses
+	Current reign is changing daily

No.	Champion	Championship change			Reign statistics			Notes	Ref.
No.	Champion	Date	Event	Location	Reign	Days	Defenses	Notes	Ref.
All Japan Pro Wrestling (AJPW)
1	Black Menso-re, Carbell Ito and Takao Omori	December 13, 2020	AJPW Prime Night	Tokyo, Japan	1	195	1	Ito, Menso-re and Omori defeated So Daimonji, Revlon and Ryouji Sai to become the inaugural champions.	
2	Total Eclipse (Tajiri, Yusuke Kodama and Hokuto Omori)	June 26, 2021	Champions Night: From The Land Of The Triple Crown Unification Flight To The 50th Anniversary	Tokyo, Japan	1	26	0		
3	Yoshitatsu Kingdom (Yoshitatsu, Seigo Tachibana and Carbell Ito)	July 22, 2021	Summer Action Series 2021	Tokyo, Japan	1 (1, 1, 2)	68	2		
—	Vacated	September 28, 2021	—	—	—	—	—	The title was vacated after Carbell Ito suffered a fractured wrist.	
4	Yoshitatsu Kingdom (Yoshitatsu, Seigo Tachibana and Takayuki Ueki)	October 16, 2021	Champions Night 2: AJPW 49th Anniversary	Tokyo, Japan	1 (2, 2, 1)	249	0	Defeated Raimu Imai, Takao Omori and Kazuhiro Tamura to win the vacant titles.	
—	Vacated	June 22, 2022	—	—	—	—	—	The title was vacated due to a "difference of direction".	
5	Takao Omori, Black Menso-re and ATM	March 14, 2023	Dream Power Series 2023	Tokyo, Japan	2 (2, 2, 3)	166	2	Defeated Black Tiger, Yusuke Kodama and Masao Hanahata to win the vacant titles. ATM was previously known as Carbell Ito.	
6	Eruption (Yukio Sakaguchi, Saki Akai and Hideki Okatani)	August 27, 2023	Royal Road Tournament 2023	Tokyo, Japan	1	55	2	This was a winner takes all match in which Eruption's KO-D 6-Man Tag Team Championship was also on the line. Akai was the first ever female to win the titles.	
7	Suwama, Mayumi Ozaki and Maya Yukihi	October 21, 2023	AJPW 51st Anniversary Tour	Tokyo, Japan	1	271	2	Win only the AJPW title; Ozaki and Yukihi are female wrestlers.	
8	Shuji Ishikawa and Team 200kg (Chihiro Hashimoto and Yuu)	July 18, 2024	Evolution Vol. 19	Tokyo, Japan	1	97	1	Hashimoto and Yuu are female wrestlers.	
9	Hokuto-gun (Cyrus, Hokuto Omori and Kuma Arashi)	October 23, 2024	Evolution Vol. 25	Tokyo, Japan	1 (1, 2, 1)	71	2		
10	Baka No Jidai (Fuminori Abe, Hikaru Sato and Yuma Aoyagi)	January 2, 2025	New Year Wars 2025	Tokyo, Japan	1 (1, 1, 1)	136	3		
11	Hokuto-gun (Takashi Yoshida, Hokuto Omori and Kuma Arashi)	May 18, 2025	Champion Carnival 2025	Tokyo, Japan	1 (1, 3, 2)	252	6		
12	Evolution (Dan Tamura, Hideki Suzuki and Suwama)	January 25, 2026	New Year Wars 2026	Chiba, Japan	1 (1, 1, 2)	133	0		
13	Kuma Arashi, Ryuki Honda and Seigo Tachibana	June 7, 2026	Super Power Series 2026	Yamagata, Japan	1 (3, 1, 3)	127	1		
14	Hideki Suzuki, Masayuki Kono and Shota Kofuji	October 12, 2026	Raising An Army Memorial Series 2026	Kitakami, Japan	1 (2, 1, 1)	15	0		
15	Go Shiozaki, Yasutaka Yano and Yuma Aoyagi	October 27, 2026	Hokkaido Dynamite Series 2026	Tomakomai, Japan	1 (1, 1, 2)	15+	0		

=== Combined reigns ===
As of November 11, 2026.

†	Indicates the current champion

Rank	Team	No. of reigns	Combined defenses	Combined days
1	Black Menso-re, Carbell Ito/ATM and Takao Omori	2	3	361
2	Suwama, Mayumi Ozaki and Maya Yukihi	1	2	271
3	Hokuto-gun (Takashi Yoshida, Hokuto Omori and Kuma Arashi)	1	6	252
4	Yoshitatsu Kingdom (Yoshitatsu, Seigo Tachibana and Takayuki Ueki)	1	0	249
5	Baka No Jidai (Fuminori Abe, Hikaru Sato and Yuma Aoyagi)	1	3	136
6	Evolution (Dan Tamura, Hideki Suzuki and Suwama)	1	0	133
7	Kuma Arashi, Ryuki Honda and Seigo Tachibana	1	1	127
8	Shuji Ishikawa and Team 200kg (Chihiro Hashimoto and Yuu)	1	1	97
9	Hokuto-gun (Cyrus, Hokuto Omori and Kuma Arashi)	1	2	71
10	Yoshitatsu Kingdom (Yoshitatsu, Seigo Tachibana and Carbell Ito)	1	2	68
11	Eruption (Yukio Sakaguchi, Saki Akai and Hideki Okatani)	1	2	55
12	Total Eclipse (Tajiri, Yusuke Kodama and Hokuto Omori)	1	0	26
13	Go Shiozaki, Yasutaka Yano and Yuma Aoyagi †	1	0	15+
14	Hideki Suzuki, Masayuki Kono and Shota Kofuji	1	0	15

==== By wrestler ====
Rank	Wrestler	No. of reigns	Combined defenses	Combined days
1	Kuma Arashi	3	9	450
2	Seigo Tachibana	3	3	444
3	Carbell Ito/ATM	3	5	429
4	Suwama	2	2	404
5	Black Menso-re	2	3	361
5	Takao Omori	2	3	361
7	Hokuto Omori	3	8	349
8	Yoshitatsu	2	2	317
9	Mayumi Ozaki	1	2	271
9	Maya Yukihi	1	2	271
11	Takashi Yoshida	1	6	252
12	Takayuki Ueki	1	0	249
13	Yuma Aoyagi †	2	3	151+
14	Hideki Suzuki	2	0	148
15	Fuminori Abe	1	3	136
15	Hikaru Sato	1	3	136
17	Dan Tamura	1	0	133
18	Ryuki Honda	1	1	127
19	Shuji Ishikawa	1	1	97
19	Chihiro Hashimoto	1	1	97
19	Yuu	1	1	97
22	Cyrus	1	2	71
23	Saki Akai	1	2	55
23	Hideki Okatani	1	2	55
23	Yukio Sakaguchi	1	2	55
26	Yusuke Kodama	1	0	26
26	Tajiri	1	0	26
28	Go Shiozaki †	1	0	15+
28	Yasutaka Yano †	1	0	15+
30	Masayuki Kono	1	0	15
30	Shota Kofuji	1	0	15

== See also ==
- NWA World Six-Man Tag Team Championship
- WAR World Six-Man Tag Team Championship
- NEVER Openweight Six-Man Tag Team Championship
- Open the Triangle Gate Championship
- Yokohama Shopping Street 6-Man Tag Team Championship
