= Hokuto Omori =

Japanese professional wrestler (born 1995)

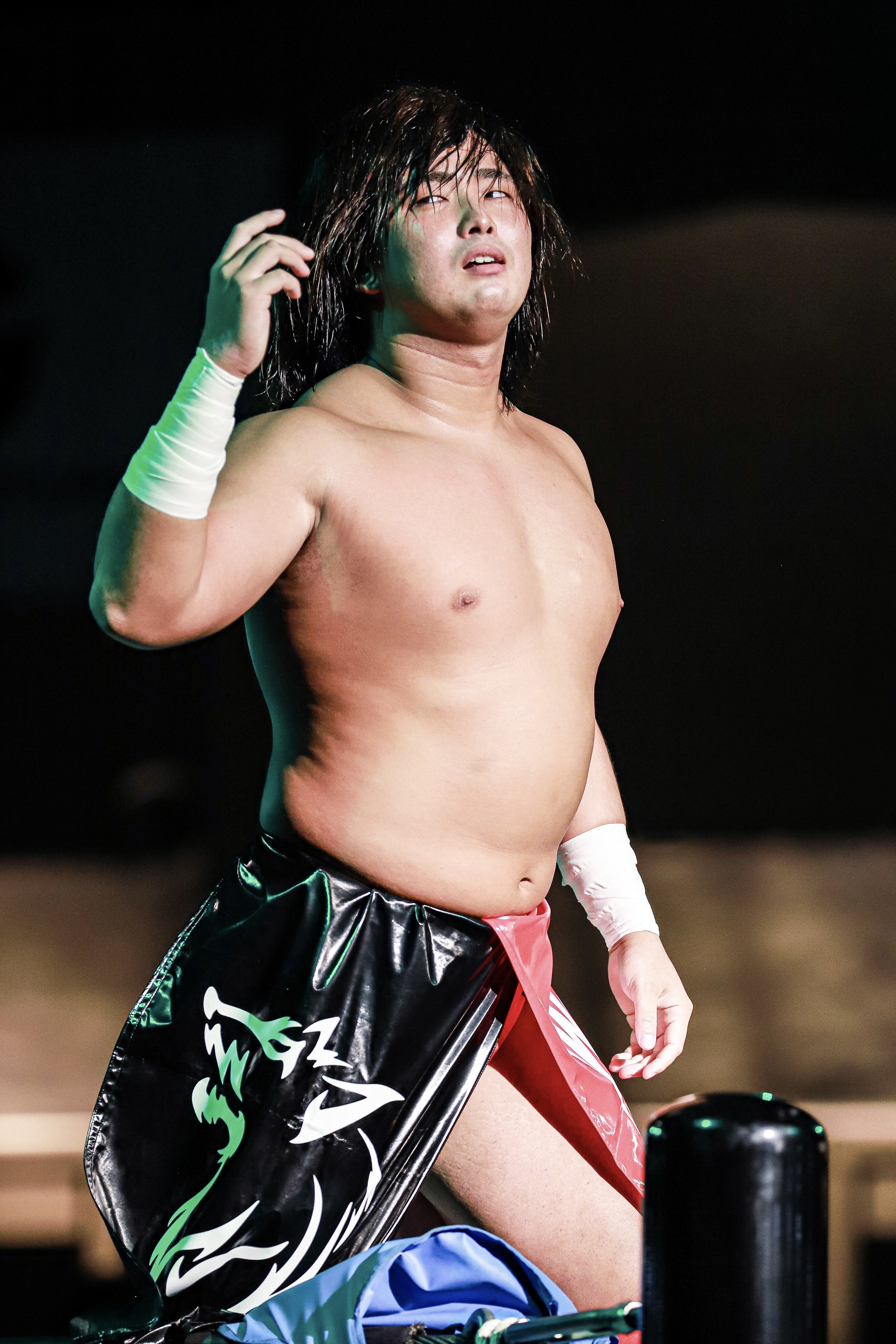
- Omori in August 2023

Personal information
- Born: June 28, 1995 (age 31) Ebetsu, Hokkaido, Japan

Professional wrestling career
- Ring name: Hokuto Omori
- Billed height: 177 cm (5 ft 10 in)
- Billed weight: 85 kg (187 lb)
- Trained by: Tajiri
- Debut: 2018

Hokuto Omori (大森北斗, Ōmori Hokuto) (born June 28, 1995) is a Japanese professional wrestler and former mixed martial artist. He is signed to the Japanese promotions All Japan Pro Wrestling where he is a former one-time All Asia Tag Team Champion and former three-time AJPW TV Six-Man Tag Team Champion.

== Professional wrestling career ==
=== Independent circuit (2018–present) ===
Omori sometimes wrestles for other promotions in the Japanese independent scene. At K-DOJO Chiba Festival 2019, an event promoted by Kaientai Dojo on May 1, 2019, Omori defeated Tatsuya Hanami.

=== All Japan Pro Wrestling (2018–present) ===
Omori made his professional wrestling debut on the second night of the 2018 Real World Tag League from November 17, 2018, where he fell short to Yusuke Okada. On the first night of the AJPW New Year Wars 2021 tour from January 2, Omori participated in a 22-man battle royal won by The Bodyguard and also involving Shigehiro Irie, Takayuki Ueki, Yoshitatsu, Osamu Nishimura and others. On the third night of the AJPW Champions ~ 50th Anniversary Tour on March 21, 2022, Omori unsuccessfully challenged Hikaru Sato for the AJPW Junior Heavyweight Championship.

During his tenure, Omori competed in various of the promotion's signature events such as the AJPW Junior Tag League, making his first appearance at the 2019 edition where he teamed up with Francesco Akira and scored a total of three points after going against Kagetora and Yosuke♥Santa Maria, Hikaru Sato and Yusuke Okada, Atsushi Maruyama and Black Menso～re, Banana Senga and Tsutomu Oosugi, and Keiichi Sato and Koji Iwamoto. At the 2020 edition of the tournament, he teamed up with his "Enfants Terribles" tag partner Yusuke Kodama to defeat Purple Haze (Izanagi and Masashi Takeda) in the first rounds but falling short to Evolution (Dan Tamura and Hikaru Sato) in the semi-finals. At the 2021 edition, he teamed up again with Kodama, this time under the name of "Total Eclipse" and defeated Takato Nakano and Masato Kamino in the first rounds, Sugi and Raicho in the semi-finals, and Evolution (Dan Tamura and Hikaru Sato) in the finals to win the tournament.

Another event is the World's Strongest Tag Determination League, making his first appearance at the 2021 edition where he teamed up with Jake Lee, placing themselves in the Block A where they scored a total of two points after going against Suwama and Shotaro Ashino, Abdullah Kobayashi and Drew Parker, and Jun Saito and Rei Saito. At the Ōdō Tournament, he made his first appearance at the 2021 edition where he defeated Ruyki Honda in the first rounds but fell short to Ayato Yoshida in the second rounds.

== Mixed martial arts record ==
Professional record breakdown
11 matches	8 wins	1 loss
By knockout	3	0
By submission	5	1
By decision	0	0
Draws	2	

Res.	Record	Opponent	Method	Event	Date	Round	Time	Location	Notes
Win	7–1–2	Hiryu	Submission (armbar)	PFC Yarennoka! 2017	December 24, 2017	2	1:38	Japan	
Draw	7–1–1	Yamato Nishikawa	Decision (unanimous)	PFC Club Fight 3	October 29, 2017	3	5:00	Japan	
Win	6–1–1	Dekky Decky	Submission (armbar)	PFC 18	October 1, 2017	1	2:28	Japan	
Win	5–1–1	Tomoki	TKO	Cracker vs PFC	August 13, 2017	1	3:09	Japan	
Win	4–1–1	Tomoki	Submission (armbar)	PFC 17	July 9, 2017	1	4:18	Japan	
Draw	4–1–0	Yamato Nishikawa	Decision (unanimous)	PFC 16	March 5, 2017	3	5:00	Japan	
Win	3–1–0	Prince	TKO	PFC Yarennoka! 2016	December 25, 2016	1	1:01	Sapporo, Japan	
Win	2–1–0	Ago	Submission (triangle choke)	PFC Yarennoka! 2016	December 25, 2016	1	1:23	Sapporo, Japan	
Win	1–1–0	Gojuryu	TKO	PFC 15	October 1, 2016	1	2:40	Sapporo, Japan	
Loss	1–0–0	Masahiro Shinmyo	Submission (rear-naked choke)	D-Spiral Second 10	August 28, 2016	2	2:28	Sapporo, Japan	
Win	0–0–0	Poncho Musa	Submission (armbar)	PFC 14	July 24, 2016	1	3:36	Sapporo, Japan	

== Championships and accomplishments ==
- All Japan Pro Wrestling
  - All Asia Tag Team Championship (1 time) – with Yusuke Kodama
  - AJPW TV Six-Man Tag Team Championship (3 times) – with Yusuke Kodama and Tajiri (1), Kuma Arashi and Cyrus (1), Takashi Yoshida and Kuma Arashi (1)
  - AJPW Junior Tag League (2021) – with Yusuke Kodama
  - World's Strongest Tag Determination League (2023) – with Katsuhiko Nakajima
