= Yusuke Kodama =

Japanese professional wrestler (born 1987)

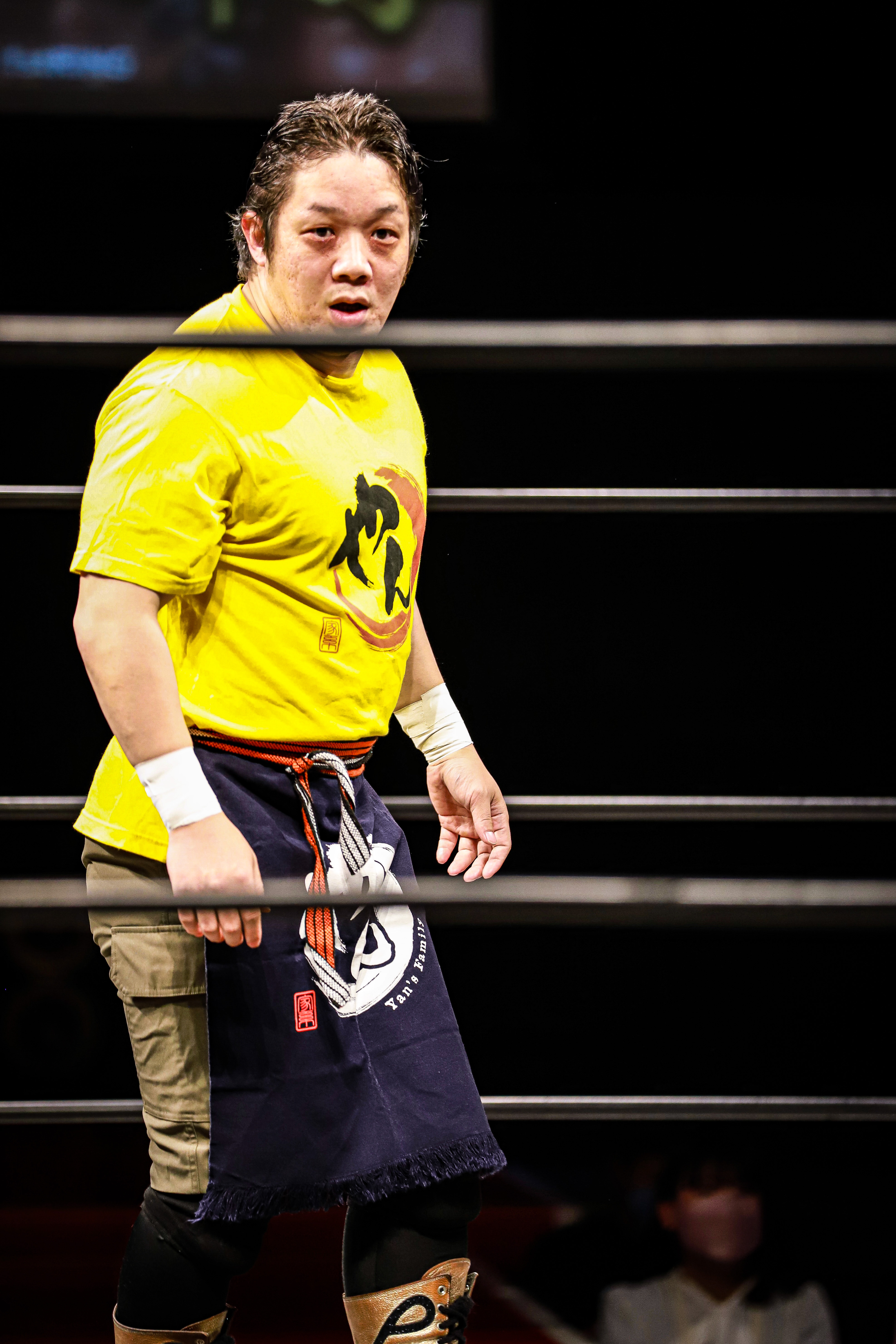
- Kodama in April 2023

Personal information
- Born: April 22, 1987 (age 39) Tsuyama, Okayama, Japan

Professional wrestling career
- Ring name(s): 14k Yusuke Kodama
- Billed height: 1.72 m (5 ft 7 1/2 in)
- Billed weight: 78 kg (172 lb)
- Trained by: Yoshihiro Tajiri
- Debut: April 23, 2010

Yusuke Kodama (児玉裕輔, Kodama Yūsuke; born April 22, 1987) is a Japanese professional wrestler and currently wrestlers for All Japan Pro Wrestling as a freelancer. Kodama is best known for his time with Wrestle-1 (W-1), where he is a former two time UWA World Trios Champion, two time Wrestle-1 Cruiser Division Champion and one time Wrestle-1 Tag Team Champion with Shotaro Ashino.

== Professional wrestling career ==
=== Smash (2010–2012) ===
Yusuke Kodama was trained by Tajiri and was set to debut in Hustle in September 2009; unfortunately, Hustle was forced to cancel all the upcoming shows due to economic issues, so Kodama followed Tajiri to the newborn Smash. Kodama made his professional wrestling debut on April 23, 2010, at Smash.2, against Hajime Ohara and lost. As is customary for most professional wrestlers, Kodama spent most of his matches losing to other, more experienced wrestlers, which would help put over other wrestlers while at the same time give Kodama some in-ring, televised, experience. Kodama would take on some of Japan's great wrestlers such as Taka Michinoku, Akira and Último Dragón. On August 24, 2010, Kodama made his New Japan Pro-Wrestling debut teaming up with fellow debutante Kazuhiro Tamura and were defeated by Ryusuke Taguchi and Taichi at Never.1. At Smash.8, on September 24, Kodama picked up his first win ever against Atchii, another young wrestler. In 2011, Kodama would begin to win more matches, including defeating experienced veteran Akira Shoji. At Smash.18, on June 9, Kodama participated in the Smash Championship tournament but would be eliminated in the first round by Big Japan Pro Wrestling's Shinya Ishikawa. Kodama would go on a three match winning streak in early 2012 which was ended at Smash.Final, on March 14, when Smash's biggest success, Kushida returned and defeated Kodama. Smash closed after the event.

=== Wrestling New Classic (2012–2014) ===
On April 5, 2012, Tajiri announced the follow-up promotion to Smash, Wrestling New Classic (WNC), which would hold its first event on April 26. Prior to WNC's first show, Kodama returned to New Japan to participate in the Road to the Super Jr. 2Days Tournament and was eliminated in the first round by Black Tiger. At WNC Before the Dawn, Kodama teamed up with Lin Byron to defeat Aki Shizuku and Koji Doi. In May, Kodama went on his first tour of Mexico, wrestling under a mask as 14K. 14K debuted for the International Wrestling Revolution Group on May 13, teaming up with Douki and Secret Sasuke and losing to Argenis, Fénix and Super Fly. He also participated in Copa High Power Internacional Torneo Cibernetico which was a 16-man Mexico vs Japan match which Mexico won.

At WNC Starting Over, Kodama and Byron teamed up with Último Dragón to defeat Josh O'Brien, Tomoka Nakagawa and Yoshiaki Yago. On May 26, Kodama teamed up with Yo-Hey to take on the reunited Unholy Alliance (Tajiri and Mikey Whipwreck) in a hardcore match which the Unholy Alliance won. Kodama would return to his jobber status, continuing to lose to more experienced opposition to gain experience. In the semi-final of the Kito Cup 2012, Kodama teamed up with Daisuke Harada and Hoshito Takahashi to lose to Jiro Kuroshio, Lin Byron and Tsubasa. With Ohara and Akira turning their back on WNC, Tajiri and Kana requested the aid of Kodama for a short period of time in August. Tajiri and Kana would continue to lose at the hands of Akira and his followers, with Kodama often losing the fall, and therefore replaced him with Mikey Whipwreck. On November 26, Kodama entered the WNC Championship tournament, but was defeated in his first round match by Tommy Dreamer. In mid-2013, Kodama turned on Tajiri and the WNC Seikigun and jumped to Akira's Synapse stable.

On June 18, 2014, Tajiri announced that WNC would be going inactive following June 26. Effective July 1, six former WNC wrestlers, Kodama included, transferred over to the Wrestle-1 promotion.

=== Wrestle-1 ===
==== Various alliances (2014–2017) ====
Kodama made his Wrestle-1 (W-1) debut on June 27, 2014, defeating Hiroki Murase in a singles match. The following month, Kodama came together with three other former WNC wrestlers; Jiro Kuroshio, Koji Doi and Rionne Fujiwara, to form the Novus stable. In September, Kodama took part in the Wrestle-1 Championship tournament, where he made it to the second round, before losing to Masayuki Kono. In November, Kodama and Doi represented Novus in the First Tag League Greatest, a tournament to determine the inaugural Wrestle-1 Tag Team Champions. The two finished last in their block with a record of one draw and three losses. Novus was effectively dissolved on December 22, when Doi turned on the stable to jump to the Desperado stable, while Masakatsu Funaki took Kuroshio under his wing. During the same event, Kodama ended his rivalry with Yasufumi Nakanoue, leading to the two forming a tag team together. On April 30, 2015, Kodama announced he was leaving for an indefinite learning excursion in North America, starting with a three-month stay in Canada with Grand Prix Wrestling. Kodama later relocated to the Northeastern parts of the United States, wrestling for such promotions as Pro Wrestling Rampage, Squared Cirlce Wrestling and House of Hardcore.

Kodama returned to Wrestle-1 on July 1, 2016. On August 11, Kodama defeated Kotaro Suzuki to win his first title, the Wrestle-1 Cruiser Division Championship. On December 7, Kodama, Andy Wu, Daiki Inaba, Jiro Kuroshio, Seiki Yoshioka, Koji Doi, Kumagoro and Kohei Fujimura formed a stable named New Era (stylised in all caps). On December 9, Kodama lost the Wrestle-1 Cruiser Division Championship to Mazada. On January 8, 2017, Kodama and Inaba unsuccessfully challenged Wrestle-1 Tag Team Champion's Kaz Hayashi and Kotaro Suzuki. On February 22, Kodama, Inaba and Fujimura defeated Jun Kasai, Nosawa Rongai and Shuji Kondo to win the UWA World Trios Championships. The trio lost them on April 9 to Hayashi, Kondo and Masayuki Kono.

==== Enfants Terribles (2017–2020) ====
On July 12, Kodama turned on his tag team partner Ganeski Tanaka allowing Seigo Tachibana and Shotaro Ashino to pick up the win. In the ensuing aftermath, Kodama attacked Daiki Inaba, cementing his heel turn and defection from New Era. The trio of Kodama, Ashino and Tachibana would go on to be known as Enfants Terribles. At Pro-Wrestling Love In Yokohama 2017, Kodama lost to Inaba. From September 24 until October 2, Kodama teamed with Ashino to take part in the Wrestle-1 Tag League, missing out on a semi-final berth with only one win. On October 21, the Enfants Terribles trio defeated New Era's Jiro Kuroshio, Koji Doi and Kumagoro to win the UWA World Trios Championships. The trio made two successful defences before losing the titles to another New Era trio in Doi, Kumagoro and Takanori Ito on December 2.

On June 13, 2018, Kodama defeated Seiki Yoshioka to win Wrestle-1 Cruiser Division Championship for the second time. After a successful title defence against El Hijo del Pantera in July, Yoshioka challenged Kodama to a rematch following a pin fall win over Kodama. At Pro Wrestling Love in Yokohama 2018, Kodama successfully defended the Wrestle-1 Cruiser Division Championship against Yoshioka. After two further title defences against Andy Wu and El Hijo del Pantera again, Kodama lost the Wrestle-1 Cruiser Division Championship to Andy Wu on April 20, 2019. At 311 days, Kodama's second Cruiser Division Championship reign was the longest in history; Kodama also holds the record for combined days and defences as champion. On August 8, Kodama and Ashino won the vacant Wrestle-1 Tag Team Championships after defeating Manabu Soya and Shuji Kondo. At Pro Wrestling Love in Yokohama 2019, Kodama and Ashino successfully defended their titles against Strong Hearts' El Lindaman and Shigehiro Irie. Kodama and Ashino made two further title defences before losing the Wrestle-1 Tag Team Championships to Daiki Inaba and Koji Doi.

On February 29, 2020, Wrestle-1 announced that they would be holding their final event on April 1, with all members of the roster being released from their contracts the day prior. At said event, Kodama defeated Takuro Niki and unsuccessfully competed in a battle royal featuring the entire Wrestle-1 roster.

=== All Japan Pro Wrestling (2020–present) ===
Kodama made his All Japan Pro Wrestling (AJPW) debut on April 30, 2020, when he teamed with Shotaro Ashino as a mystery partner in a winning effort against Takao Omori and Hokuto Omori. The following week, Kuma Arashi also joined All Japan and the trio quickly established Enfants Terribles as a force to be reckoned with; they would later be joined by Hokuto Omori and Koji Doi. Although Kodama is a regular for All Japan, he remains a freelancer and appears for various independent promotions. On May 24, Kodama debuted for Big Japan Pro Wrestling (BJW) teaming with Kazuki Hashimoto to defeat Kosuke Sato and Kota Sekifuda. On June 30, Kodama lost to Koji Iwamoto in a World Junior Heavyweight Championship number one contendership match, his first pinfall loss in All Japan. In the summer, Kodama participated in the BJW Junior Heavyweight Championship Next Challenger Tournament; losing to Shinobu in the semi-finals on August 10. On September 30, Kodama defeated Koji Doi to win Asuka Pro Wrestling's Best of Asuka Tournament having defeated Jiro Kuroshio and Minoru Tanaka in the previous rounds. On December 27, he teamed with Omori to participate in the Jr. Tag Battle of Glory, losing to eventual winners Dan Tamura and Hikaru Sato in the semi-final. On January 9, 2021, he won 666's Tag Team Tournament with Koju Takeda. On February 23, Kodama and the other members of Enfants Terribles turned on Ashino during a six man tag team match. In the post match beatdown, Jake Lee also attacked Ashino and turned on his tag partner Iwamoto with the five men leaving together.

On March 6, Kodama, alongside Jake Lee, Hokuto Omori, Koji Doi, Kuma Arashi and Tajiri, debuted as Total Eclipse. They defeated Ashino, Iwamoto, Dan Tamura, Hikaru Sato and Suwama in a ten man tag team elimination match which didn't include Arashi.

== Championships and accomplishments ==
- All Japan Pro Wrestling
  - All Asia Tag Team Championship (2 times) – with Hokuto Omori (1) and Masao Hanahata
  - AJPW TV Six-Man Tag Team Championship (1 time) – with Tajiri and Hokuto Omori
  - Jr. Tag Battle of Glory (2021) – with Hokuto Omori
- Asuka Pro Wrestling
  - Best of Asuka Tournament (2020)
- Darkness Pro-Wrestling Organization 666
  - Tag Team Tournament (2021) – with Koju Takeda
- Tenryu Project
  - Tenryu Project International Junior Heavyweight Championship (1 time)
  - Tenryu Project International Junior Heavyweight Tag Team Championship (3 times) – with Naoki Tanizaki (2) and Takuro Niki (1)
  - Tenryu Project World 6-Man Tag Team Championship (1 time) – with Masayuki Kono and Kuma Arashi
- Wrestle-1
  - UWA World Trios Championship (2 times) – with Daiki Inaba and Kohei Fujimura (1), and Seigo Tachibana and Shotaro Ashino (1)
  - Wrestle-1 Cruiser Division Championship (2 times)
  - Wrestle-1 Tag Team Championship (1 time) – with Shotaro Ashino
