= Tenka Sanbun no Kei =

Japanese professional wrestling event series

- Promotions: Big Japan Pro Wrestling; DDT Pro-Wrestling; Kaientai Dojo
- First event: BJW in Fukuoka (2007)
- Last event: Club-K Tour in Hakata (2015)

Tenka Sanbun no Kei (Japanese: 天下三分の計) was a series of professional wrestling events co-promoted by Big Japan Pro Wrestling (BJW), DDT Pro-Wrestling (DDT) and Kaientai Dojo (K-Dojo) between 2007 and 2015. Tenka Sanbun no Kei was a series of tours in which BJW, DDT and K-Dojo held shows in the morning, afternoon and night at the same venue on the same day. The name "Tenka Sanbun no Kei" is a reference to the historical events surrounding the Longzhong Plan during the Three Kingdoms period.

== First tour (2007–2008) ==
The first tour took place on October 7 and 28, 2007 and January 20, 2008 respectively in Fukuoka, Sapporo and Chiba.

=== October 7 ===
The first three shows were held on October 7, 2007 at the Hakata Star Lane in Hakata, Fukuoka.

Big Japan Pro Wrestling
No.	Results	Stipulations	Times
1	Hakaru Imai defeated Atsushi Ohashi by submission	Singles match	6:01
2	Daikokubō Benkei defeated Yuichi Taniguchi	Singles match	9:34
3	Men's Teioh and Onryo defeated Yusaku Obata and Craig	Tag team match	13:05
4	Kintaro Kanemura and Mammoth Sasaki defeated Daisuke Sekimoto and Katsumasa Inoue	Tag team match	12:52
5	Jun Kasai defeated Yuko Miyamoto	Random Box & Chain Deathmatch; Fourth in Miyamoto's "Yankee 7 Deathmatches Series"	17:21
6	Abdullah Kobayashi, Ryuji Ito and Shadow WX defeated Takashi Sasaki, "Black Angel" Jaki Numazawa and Masada	Fluorescent Light Tubes Deathmatch	20:25

DDT Pro-Wrestling
No.	Results	Stipulations	Times
1	Yuki Sato and Yukihiro Abe defeated Seiya Morohashi and Masami Morohashi	Tag team match	10:28
2	Kaizo Hebi Ningen Jakaider and Tappuri! Tarako Man defeated Muscle Sakai and Hoshitango	Tag team match	6:08
3	Koo defeated Thanomsak Toba	Singles match	7:52
4	Kudo and Yasu Urano defeated Shuji Kondo and Antonio "The Dragon" Honda	Tag team match	14:46
5	Mikami, Rion Mizuki and Azul Dragón defeated Sanshiro Takagi and Nuru Nuru Brothers (Michael Nakazawa and Tomomitsu Matsunaga)	Six-man tag team match	14:03
6	Disaster Box (Harashima and Toru Owashi) defeated Danshoku Dino and Kota Ibushi	Tag team match	16:45

Kaientai Dojo
No.	Results	Stipulations	Times
1	Taku Anzawa defeated Hiro Tonai	Singles match	9:19
2	Mr. X, Saburo Inematsu and Yuu Yamagata defeated Daigoro Kashiwa, Kaji Yamato and Apple Miyuki	Six-person tag team match	11:14
3	Omega (Miyawaki and Naoki Tanizaki) defeated Boso Boy Raito and Boso Boy Left	Tag team match	14:58
4	Joe, Taka Michinoku and Psycho defeated Omega (Yuji Hino, Makoto Oishi and Shiori Asahi)	Six-man tag team match	22:42
5	Madoka and Kengo Mashimo defeated Ryota Chikuzen and Kazma (c)	Tag team match for the Strongest-K Tag Team Championship	23:17
(c) / – the champion(s) heading into the match

=== October 28 ===
The October 28 shows were held in Sapporo at the Sapporo Teisen Hall.

DDT Pro-Wrestling
No.	Results	Stipulations	Times
1	Masa Takanashi defeated Choun Shiryu	Singles match	3:13
2	Danshoku Dino won by last eliminating Thanomsak Toba (Note: Other competitors: Futoshi Miwa, Hoshitango, Mecha Mummy, Muscle Sakai, and Tappuri! Tarako Man)	Muroran Rumble	11:03
3	Yasu Urano and Tomoya defeated Nuru Nuru Brothers (Tomomitsu Matsunaga and Michael Nakazawa)	Tag team match	16:29
4	Aloha World Order (Prince Togo and Koo) defeated Seiya Morohashi and Masami Morohashi	Tag team match	16:36
5	Kota Ibushi (c) defeated Antonio "The Dragon" Honda	Singles match for the Independent World Junior Heavyweight Championship	19:25
6	DDT Legend Army (Mikami, Sanshiro Takagi and Poison Sawada Julie) defeated Toru Owashi, Kudo and Harashima	Six-man tag team match	13:00
(c) / – the champion(s) heading into the match

Kaientai Dojo
No.	Results	Stipulations	Times
1	Kaji Yamato and Daisuke Harada defeated Taku Anzawa and Hiro Tonai	Tag team match	8:46
2	Apple Miyuki defeated Tomoka Nakagawa	Singles match	7:24
3	Omega (Naoki Tanizaki and Miyawaki) defeated Saburo Inematsu and Psycho	Tag team match	12:56
4	Taka Michinoku, Joe and Quiet Storm defeated Ryota Chikuzen, Kazma and Yuu Yamagata	Six-person tag team match	18:08
5	Kengo Mashimo, Madoka and Boso Boy Raito defeated Omega (Yuji Hino, Shiori Asahi and Makoto Oishi)	Six-man tag team match	22:35

Big Japan Pro Wrestling
No.	Results	Stipulations	Times
1	Hakaru Imai defeated Atsushi Ohashi by submission	Singles match	8:36
2	Daikokubō Benkei defeated Yuichi Taniguchi	Singles match	10:15
3	Men's Teioh and Shinobu defeated Mototsugu Shimizu and Craig	Tag team match	14:12
4	Shadow WX defeated Masada	Hardcore match	16:57
5	Kintaro Kanemura defeated Yuko Miyamoto	Spirdernet & Barbed Wire Boards Deathmatch; Fifth in Miyamoto's "Yankee 7 Deathmatches Series"	14:33
6	Daisuke Sekimoto and Katsumasa Inoue defeated Tetsuhiro Kuroda and Yusaku Obata	Tag team match	20:21
7	Ryuji Ito and Kesen Numajiro defeated Takashi Sasaki and Abdullah Kobayashi and 045 Junkie's ("Black Angel" Jaki Numazawa and Jun Kasai)	Double Ring Three-way tag team deathmatch	19:41

=== January 20 ===
The final stint of the tour was held on January 20, 2008 at the Chiba Blue Field (now the 2AW Square) in Chiba.

DDT Pro-Wrestling
No.	Results	Stipulations	Times
1	Danshoku Dino (c) defeated Hoshitango, Miyawaki, and Muscle Sakai	Four-way match for the DDT Extreme Championship	43:13
2	Daichi Kakimoto defeated Yukihiro Abe by submission	Singles match	11:50
3	Metal Vampires (Dick Togo, Toru Owashi and Seiya Morohashi) defeated Antonio "The Dragon" Honda, Tomomitsu Matsunaga and Masami Morohashi by submission	Six-man tag team match	10:12
4	DDT Legend Army (Sanshiro Takagi, Poison Sawada Julie and Thanomsak Toba) defeated Masa Takanashi, Yoshiaki Yago and Michael Nakazawa	Six-man tag team match	12:09
5	Kudo and Yasu Urano defeated Harashima and Kota Ibushi	Tag team match	16:30
(c) / – the champion(s) heading into the match

Kaientai Dojo
No.	Results	Stipulations	Times
1	Hiro Tonai, Daigoro Kashiwa and Kintaro Kawasaki defeated Apple Miyuki, Yuu Yamagata and Taku Anzawa by submission	Six-person tag team match	9:08
2	Miyawaki defeated Kazuya Horiuchi	Singles match	2:19
3	Teppei Ishizaka defeated Boso Boy Raito and Kaji Yamato	Three-way match	9:49
4	Omega (Shiori Asahi, Makoto Oishi and Naoki Tanizaki) defeated Kunio Toshima, Saburo Inematsu and Taishi Takizawa	Six-person tag team match	13:49
5	Kengo Mashimo and Madoka defeated Gekirin (Mr. X and Psycho)	Kaientai Dojo Tag League first round match	16:46
6	Omega (Kazma and Yuji Hino) defeated Handsome (Joe and Taka Michinoku)	Kaientai Dojo Tag League first round match	17:37

Big Japan Pro Wrestling
No.	Results	Stipulations	Times
1	Kankuro Hoshino defeated Atsushi Ohashi by submission	Singles match	6:44
2	Daikokubō Benkei and Yuichi Taniguchi defeated Men's Teioh and Shinobu	Tag team match	12:32
3	Yusaku Obata and Kintaro Kanemura defeated Gentaro and Toshihiro Sueyoshi	Tag team match	10:20
4	Takashi Sasaki defeated Katsumasa Inoue	Singles match	14:53
5	Yoshihito Sasaki and Daisuke Sekimoto defeated Mammoth Sasaki and Abdullah Kobayashi	Tag team match	12:52
6	Shadow WX and Ryuji Ito defeated "Black Angel" Jaki Numazawa and Yuko Miyamoto	Barbed Wire Board Deathmatch	18:32

== Second tour (2008) ==
The second tour featured six dates from October 12 to December 14, 2008. In addition to the three main dates in Sapporo, Kobe and Fukuoka, the tour featured three non-televised events held by the three promotions together.

=== October 12 ===
The first date of the tour was a joint show held at the Tonyamachi Big Sight in Aomori.

No.	Results	Stipulations	Times
1	Shinya Ishikawa defeated Yuji Okabayashi by submission	Singles match BJW match	6:27
2	Danshoku Dino defeated Thanomsak Toba	Singles match DDT match	10:23
3	Yuji Hino defeated Hiro Tonai	Singles match K-Dojo match	9:27
4	Takashi Sasaki and Yuko Miyamoto defeated Abdullah Kobayashi and "Black Angel" Jaki Numazawa	Fluorescent Light Tubes Deathmatch; BJW match	14:31
5	Kudo and Yasu Urano defeated Poison Sawada Julie and Michael Nakazawa	Tag team match DDT match	13:08
6	Handsome (Taka Michinoku and Joe) defeated Omega (Shiori Asahi and Makoto Oishi) by submission	Tag team match K-Dojo match	18:32
7	Harashima, Kengo Mashimo and Madoka defeated Daisuke Sekimoto, Masa Takanashi and Ryuji Ito	Six-man tag team match	19:29

=== October 13 ===
The October 13 shows were held in Sapporo, at the Sapporo Teisen Hall.

Kaientai Dojo
No.	Results	Stipulations	Times
1	Yuu Yamagata and Tomoko Nakagawa defeated Kaji Yamato and Apple Miyuki	Tag team match	10:31
2	Kazma defeated Quiet Storm	Singles match	10:14
3	Taishi Takizawa and Hiro Tonai defeated Madoka and Boso Boy Raito	Tag team match First in Takizawa and Tonai's "Road to the Strongest Tag" 5-match series	11:16
4	Kunio Toshima and Daigoro Kashiwa defeated Omega (Yuji Hino and Shiori Asahi)	Tag team match	13:44
5	Makoto Oishi (c) defeated Taka Michinoku	Singles match for the Independent World Junior Heavyweight Championship	9:54
6	Kengo Mashimo (c) defeated Joe	Singles match for the NWA United National Heavyweight Championship	19:06
(c) / – the champion(s) heading into the match

Big Japan Pro Wrestling
No.	Results	Stipulations	Times
1	Atsushi Ohashi vs. Ryuichi Kawakami ended in a time limit draw	Singles match	5:00
2	Daikokubō Benkei defeated Yuichi Taniguchi	Singles match	9:05
3	Daisuke Sekimoto and Katsumasa Inoue defeated Shinya Ishikawa and Yuji Okabayashi	Tag team match	11:42
4	Ryuji Ito and Isami Kodaka defeated Abdullah Kobayashi and Kankuro Hoshino	Tag team match	18:57
5	045 Junkie's (Jun Kasai and "Black Angel" Jaki Numazawa) defeated Men's Teioh and Ryuji Yamakawa	Tag team match	17:40
6	Shadow WX and The Winger defeated Takashi Sasaki and Yuko Miyamoto	Fluorescent Light Tubes Board Deathmatch	21:15

DDT Pro-Wrestling
No.	Results	Stipulations	Times
1	Disaster Box (Harashima and Toru Owashi) defeated Yasu Urano and Yukihiro Abe	Tag team match	12:47
2	Tomoya and Pittari! Tokeidai Otoko defeated Seiya Morohashi and Futoshi Miwa	Tag team match	12:44
3	Suicide Boyz (Mikami and Thanomsak Toba) defeated Nuru Nuru Brothers (Michael Nakazawa and Tomomitsu Matsunaga)	Tag team match	11:26
4	Danshoku Dino defeated Poison Sawada Julie	Singles match	16:09
5	Italian Four Horsemen (Francesco Togo, Antonio Honda and Sasaki and Gabbana) defeated Kudo, Kota Ibushi and Masa Takanashi	Six-man tag team match	12:00
6	Sanshiro Takagi (c) defeated Muscle Sakai	Singles match for the DDT Extreme Championship	19:39
(c) / – the champion(s) heading into the match

=== November 23 ===
The November 23 shows were held in Kobe, at the Kobe Sanbo Hall.

DDT Pro-Wrestling
No.	Results	Stipulations	Times
1	Mikami, Tomomitsu Matsunaga and Yukihiro Abe defeated Hoshitango, Shoichi Uchida and Masa Takanashi	Six-man tag team match	10:43
2	Michael Nakazawa and Hikaru Sato defeated Hideki Shioda and 244 (with Sanshiro Takagi)	Losers Leave DDT tag team match	1:12
3	Michael Nakazawa and Hikaru Sato defeated Hideki Shioda and 244 (with Sanshiro Takagi) by knockout	Losers Leave DDT tag team rematch	1:16
4	Michael Nakazawa and Hikaru Sato vs. Hideki Shioda and 244 (with Sanshiro Takagi) ended in a no contest	Losers Leave DDT tag team re-rematch Following the decision, 244 was banished from DDT by losing at rock-paper-scissors.	9:01
5	Kudo defeated Poison Sawada Julie	Singles match	11:03
6	Harashima defeated Seiya Morohashi	Singles match	12:48
7	Toru Owashi defeated Yasu Urano	Singles match	13:56
8	Italian Four Horsemen (Francesco Togo, Piza Michinoku, Sasaki and Gabbana and Antonio Honda) defeated Sanshiro Takagi, Danshoku Dino, Muscle Sakai and Masa Takanashi	Eight-man tag team match	15:23

Kaientai Dojo
No.	Results	Stipulations	Times
1	Taishi Takizawa defeated Randy Takuya	Singles match	8:52
2	Kashiwa Dojo (Boso Boy Raito and Apple Miyuki) defeated Kikutaro and Yuu Yamagata	Tag team match	14:43
3	Miyawaki defeated Tadanobu Fujisawa	Singles match	10:23
4	Omega (Kazma, Shiori Asahi and Yuji Hino) defeated Gekirin (Mr. X, Saburo Inematsu and Psycho)	Six-man tag team match	16:03
5	Makoto Oishi (c) defeated Atsushi Kotoge	Singles match for the Independent World Junior Heavyweight Championship	16:06
6	Handsome (Joe and Taka Michinoku) defeated Kengo Mashimo and Madoka	Tag team match	19:42
(c) / – the champion(s) heading into the match

Big Japan Pro Wrestling
No.	Results	Stipulations	Times
1	Blood & Guts (Daisuke Harada and Tadasuke) defeated Katsumasa Inoue and Atsushi Ohashi	Tag team match	10:48
2	Daikokubō Benkei and Yuichi Taniguchi defeated Miracle Man and Kanjyuro Matsuyama	Tag team match	14:28
3	Masada defeated Mototsugu Shimizu	Hardcore match	11:34
4	Daisuke Sekimoto and Yuji Okabayashi defeated Yoshihito Sasaki and Shinya Ishikawa	Tag team match	12:30
5	045 Junkie's (Jun Kasai and "Black Angel" Jaki Numazawa) defeated Abdullah Kobayashi and Kankuro Hoshino	Hardcore match	16:38
6	Shadow WX and Ryuji Ito defeated Takashi Sasaki and Yuko Miyamoto	Fluorescent Light Tubes Deathmatch	14:37

=== November 24 ===
The November 24 show was a joint event held at the Kanazawa Ryūtsū Hall in Kanazawa.

No.	Results	Stipulations	Times
1	Yoshihito Sasaki defeated Shinya Ishikawa by submission	Singles match BJW match	7:41
2	Antonio Honda defeated Michael Nakazawa	Singles match DDT match	7:49
3	Taka Michinoku defeated Boso Boy Raito by submission	Singles match K-Dojo match	9:59
4	045 Junkie's (Jun Kasai and "Black Angel" Jaki Numazawa) defeated Takashi Sasaki and Yuko Miyamoto	Fluorescent Light Tubes Deathmatch; BJW match	14:36
5	Danshoku Dino and Muscle Sakai defeated Mikami and Masa Takanashi	Tag team match DDT match	11:55
6	Omega (Yuji Hino and Kazma) defeated Kengo Mashimo and Taishi Takizawa	Tag team match K-Dojo match	16:24
7	Harashima, Makoto Oishi and Ryuji Ito defeated Abdullah Kobayashi, Saburo Inematsu and Sanshiro Takagi	Six-man tag team match	13:12

=== December 13 ===
The December 13 show was a joint event held at the Hiroshima Industrial Center in Hiroshima.

No.	Results	Stipulations	Times
1	Yoshihito Sasaki defeated Yuji Okabayashi by submission	Singles match BJW match	9:20
2	Hikaru Sato and Michael Nakazawa vs. Masa Takanashi and Seiya Morohashi ended in a no contest	Tag team match DDT match	12:15
3	Kazma defeated Boso Boy Raito	Singles match K-Dojo match	9:20
4	Poison Sawada Julie defeated Kudo and Danshoku Dino	Three-way match DDT match	8:01
5	Omega (Yuji Hino and Makoto Oishi) defeated Joe and Taishi Takizawa	Tag team match K-Dojo match	16:27
6	Sanshiro Takagi, Ryuji Ito and Taka Michinoku vs. Kengo Mashimo, Harashima and Daisuke Sekimoto ended in a time limit draw	Six-man tag team match	30:00
7	Takashi Sasaki and Yuko Miyamoto defeated Jun Kasai and Masada	Fluorescent Light Tubes Deathmatch; BJW match	16:41

=== December 14 ===
The December 14 shows were held at the Hakata Star Lane in Hakata, Fukuoka.

Big Japan Pro Wrestling
No.	Results	Stipulations	Times
1	Junji Tanaka defeated Ryuichi Kawakami by submission	Singles match	8:55
2	Katsumasa Inoue defeated Yuji Okabayashi	Singles match	9:56
3	Yuichi Taniguchi and Kankuro Hoshino defeated Daikokubō Benkei and Atsushi Ohashi	Tag team match	13:24
4	045 Junkie's (Jun Kasai and "Black Angel" Jaki Numazawa) defeated Men's Teioh and Masada	Tag team match	15:56
5	Men's Club (Ryuji Ito and Daisuke Sekimoto) defeated Yoshihito Sasaki and Shinya Ishikawa	Tag team match	13:04
6	Takashi Sasaki and Yuko Miyamoto defeated Abdullah Kobayashi and Shadow WX	Fluorescent Light Tubes Deathmatch	16:23

DDT Pro-Wrestling
No.	Results	Stipulations	Times
1	Danshoku Dino vs. Sasaki and Gabbana ended in a double knockout	Singles match	10:02
2	Michael Nakazawa and Hikaru Sato vs. Muscle Sakai and Seiya Morohashi ended in a no contest	Tag team match	9:05
3	Tappuri! Tarako Man defeated Pittari! Tokeidai Man by submission	Singles match	4:38
4	Mikami, Rion Mizuki and Azul Dragón defeated Kudo, Tomomitsu Matsunaga and Yukihiro Abe	Six-man tag team match	12:53
5	Mr. Gannosuke and Yasu Urano defeated DDT Legend Army (Sanshiro Takagi and Poison Sawada Julie)	Tag team match	16:59
6	Disaster Box (Harashima and Toru Owashi) defeated Italian Four Horsemen (Francesco Togo and Antonio Honda)	Tag team match	16:42

Kaientai Dojo
No.	Results	Stipulations	Times
1	Gekirin (Kunio Toshima and Mr. X) defeated Ryuichi Sekine and Taishi Takizawa	Tag team match	9:33
2	Junji Tanaka defeated Randy Takuya by submission	Singles match	7:45
3	Yuu Yamagata defeated Bambi	Singles match	7:00
4	Saburo Inematsu defeated Boso Boy Raito	Singles match	10:56
5	Kengo Mashimo, Ryota Chikuzen and Yoshiya defeated Omega (Kazma, Miyawaki and Yuji Hino)	Six-man tag team match	20:54
6	Omega (Makoto Oishi and Shiori Asahi) defeated Handsome (Joe and Taka Michinoku) (c)	Tag team match for the Strongest-K Tag Team Championship	21:12
(c) / – the champion(s) heading into the match

== Third tour (2009) ==
The third tour took place on December 13 and 31, 2009 in Fukuoka and Tokyo.

=== December 13 ===
The December 13 shows were held at the Hakata Star Lane in Hakata, Fukuoka.

Kaientai Dojo
No.	Results	Stipulations	Times
1	Gekirin (Kunio Toshima and Psycho) and Taishi Takizawa defeated Ryuichi Sekine, Yoshiya and Yuu Yamagata	Six-man tag team match	13:48
2	Boso Boy Raito defeated Bambi	Singles match	6:12
3	Handsome (Joe and Taka Michinoku) defeated Junji Tanaka and Shinsuke Jet Wakataka	Tag team match	14:54
4	Kaji Tomato defeated Yuki Sato	Singles match Tournament final for #1 contendership to the UWA World Middleweight Championship	15:51
5	Omega (Makoto Oishi, Miyawaki, Saburo Inematsu and Shiori Asahi) defeated Monster Plant (Daigoro Kashiwa, Hiro Tonai, Kazma and Kengo Mashimo)	Eight-man elimination tag team match	33:48

DDT Pro-Wrestling
No.	Results	Stipulations	Times
1	Danshoku Dino defeated Ken Ohka, Soma Takao and Yukihiro Abe	3-on-1 handicap match	4:30
2	Rion Mizuki defeated Tomokazu Taniguchi	Singles match	7:48
3	Francesco Togo defeated Azul Dragón	Singles match	10:39
4	Disaster Box (Harashima and Toru Owashi) defeated Gota Ihashi and Mikami	Tag team match	14:42
5	Kudo and Yasu Urano (c) defeated Italian Four Horsemen (Antonio Honda and Sasaki and Gabbana) and Hikaru Sato and Masa Takanashi	Three-way match for the KO-D Tag Team Championship	16:36
6	Kota Ibushi defeated Keisuke Ishii, Michael "CEO" Nakazawa and Sanshiro Takagi	Four-way Falls Count Anywhere elimination match	19:25
(c) / – the champion(s) heading into the match

Big Japan Pro Wrestling
No.	Results	Stipulations	Times
1	Craig and Takumi Tsukamoto defeated Kazuki Hashimoto and Ryuichi Kawakami	Tag team match	8:05
2	Men's Teioh and Yuichi Taniguchi defeated Atsushi Ohashi and Daikokubō Benkei	Tag team match	5:51
3	045 Junkie's (Jun Kasai and "Black Angel" Jaki Numazawa) defeated Kankuro Hoshino and Masada	Street Fight tag team Deathmatch	14:58
4	Yoshihito Sasaki and Shinya Ishikawa defeated Strong BJ (Daisuke Sekimoto and Yuji Okabayashi) (c)	Tag team match for the BJW Tag Team Championship	18:29
5	Ryuji Ito and Takashi Sasaki defeated Abdullah Kobayashi and Shadow WX, and Isami Kodama and Yuko Miyamoto	Three-way tag team Fluorescent Light Tubes Deathmatch	14:34
(c) / – the champion(s) heading into the match

=== December 31 ===
The December 31 event was a special joint show subtitled "New Year's Eve Special" held at the Korakuen Hall in Tokyo. It was part of the series of New Year's Eve joint events that led to the creation of the New Year's Eve Pro-Wrestling (年越しプロレス, Toshikoshi Puroresu) brand.

No.	Results	Stipulations	Times
1^{D}	Ryuichi Sekine, Soma Takao and Kazuki Hashimoto defeated Sasaki and Gabbana, Craig and Kim Nam-seok by submission	Six-man tag team match	8:53
2	Masa Takanashi defeated Antonio Honda	Singles match	8:07
3	Yuji Okabayashi and Takumi Tsukamoto defeated Atsushi Ohashi and Ryuichi Kawakami	Tag team match	11:23
4	Randy Takuya and Taishi Takizawa defeated Boso Boy Raito and Kaji Tomato, Gekirin (Kunio Toshima and Psycho) and Yamashita Ikka (Yoshiya and Yuu Yamagata)	Four-way tag team elimination match	4:58
5	Team New Leader (Great Kojika, Mighty Inoue, Tiger Toguchi, Goro Tsurumi and Gran Hamada) defeated Team Now Leader (Taka Michinoku, Abdullah Kobayashi, Sanshiro Takagi, Poison Sawada Julie and Men's Teioh)	5-on-5 elimination match	14:30
6	Danshoku Dino defeated Kota Ibushi, Kenny Omega and Michael Nakazawa	Four-way Falls Count Anywhere Thunder Fire Street Fight	13:07
7	Omega (Saburo Inematsu, Shiori Asahi and Miyawaki) defeated Monster Plant (Kengo Mashimo, Daigoro Kashiwa and Hiro Tonai)	Six-man tag team match	13:19
8	Ryuji Ito, Shadow WX and "Black Angel" Jaki Numazawa defeated Yuko Miyamoto, Isami Kodaka and Masashi Takeda, and Takashi Sasaki, Jun Kasai and The Winger	Three-way Fluorescent Light Tubes Deathmatch	10:57
9	Yoshihito Sasaki, Shuji Ishikawa and Yuji Hino defeated Daisuke Sekimoto, Kudo and Kazma	Six-man tag team match	21:30
10	Jun Kasai won by last eliminating The Great Kirara	108-participant New Year's Eve Rumble	1:25:12
D / – this was a dark match

== Fourth tour (2010) ==
The fourth tour took place on December 12, 2010, at the Hakata Star Lane in Hakata, Fukuoka.

Big Japan Pro Wrestling
No.	Results	Stipulations	Times
1	Kankuro Hoshino and Yuichi Taniguchi defeated Daikokubō Benkei and Masato Inaba	Tag team match	9:57
2	Men's Teioh and Takumi Tsukamoto defeated Atsushi Ohashi and Kazuki Hashimoto	Tag team match	8:44
3	Abdullah Kobayashi and Takashi Sasaki defeated Ryuji Ito and Shadow WX	Barbed Wire Board Deathmatch	15:26
4	Daisuke Sekimoto and Shinya Ishikawa defeated The Non-Stops (Ryuichi Kawakami and Yoshihito Sasaki)	Tag team match	14:17
5	045 Junkie's (Jun Kasai and "Black Angel" Jaki Numazawa) defeated Isami Kodama and Masashi Takeda	Fluorescent Light Tubes Deathmatch	20:19

DDT Pro-Wrestling
No.	Results	Stipulations	Times
1	Batten Tamagawa defeated Michael Nakazawa	Singles match	9:13
2	Sanshiro Takagi and Shigehiro Irie defeated Mikami and Rion Mizuki	Tag team match	9:38
3	Dick Togo and Yasu Urano defeated Toru Owashi and Kazuki Hirata	Tag team match	11:34
4	Harashima defeated Keisuke Ishii	Singles match	6:55
5	From the Northern Country (Antonio Honda and Daisuke Sasaki) (c) defeated Shit Heart♥Foundation (Soma Takao and Tomomitsu Matsunaga) by disqualification	Tag team match for the CMLL KO-D Tag Team Championship	14:09
6	Kudo defeated Hikaru Sato	Singles match	13:33
7	Danshoku Dino defeated Kota Ibushi	Singles match	16:09
(c) / – the champion(s) heading into the match

Kaientai Dojo
No.	Results	Stipulations	Times
1	Ryuichi Sekine and Saburo Inematsu defeated Joe and Randy Takuya	Tag team match	12:54
2	Yuu Yamagata and Bambi defeated Makoto Oishi and Aoi Ishibashi	Tag team match	11:39
3	Taka Michinoku, Ryota Chikuzen and Yuki Sato defeated Yuji Hino, Marines Mask II and Mentai☆Kid	Six-man tag team match	16:19
4	Shiori Asahi defeated Shinsuke Jet Wakataka	Singles match	21:51
5	Hiroki and Kengo Mashimo (c) defeated Taishi Takizawa and Kaji Tomato	Tag team match for the Strongest-K Tag Team Championship	22:51
(c) / – the champion(s) heading into the match

== Fifth tour (2011) ==
The fifth tour took place on December 11, 2011, at the Hakata Star Lane in Hakata, Fukuoka.

Big Japan Pro Wrestling
No.	Results	Stipulations	Times
1	Kazuki Hashimoto and Takumi Tsukamoto defeated Masato Inaba and Masashi Otani	Tag team match	9:35
2	Ryuji Yamakawa and Yuichi Taniguchi defeated Sakigake and Atsushi Ohashi	Tag team match	11:11
3	Yankee Nichōkenjū (Yuko Miyamoto and Isami Kodaka) defeated Kankuro Hoshino and Masashi Takeda	Barbed Wire Board Deathmatch	15:19
4	Yoshihito Sasaki and Shinobu defeated Ryuichi Kawakami and Shinya Ishikawa	Tag team match	12:03
5	Daisuke Sekimoto defeated Yuji Okabayashi	Singles match	19:32
6	Ōuetsu Reppan Dōmei (Shadow WX and Takashi Sasaki) and Ryuji Ito defeated 045 Junkie's (Jun Kasai and "Black Angel" Jaki Numazawa) and Abdullah Kobayashi	Fluorescent Light Tubes Deathmatch	15:05

DDT Pro-Wrestling
No.	Results	Stipulations	Times
1	Tomomitsu Matsunaga defeated Kazuki Hirata	Singles match	8:23
2	Daisuke Sasaki and Rion Mizuki defeated Azul Dragón and DJ Nira	Tag team match	14:00
3	A. Yazawa and Ken Ohka defeated Michael Nakazawa and Batten Tamagawa	Rock 'n' Roll Deathmatch	9:32
4	Hikaru Sato defeated Yasu Urano	Singles match	13:47
5	Keisuke Ishii and Shigehiro Irie (c) defeated Belt Hunter×Hunter (Danshoku Dino and Makoto Oishi)	Tag team match for the KO-D Tag Team Championship	12:19
6	Kudo, Harashima and Masa Takanashi defeated Sanshiro Takagi, Mikami and Soma Takao	Six-man tag team match	14:20
(c) / – the champion(s) heading into the match

Kaientai Dojo
No.	Results	Stipulations	Times
1	Marines Mask II defeated Kotaro Nasu	Singles match	9:56
2	Ricky Fuji defeated Apple Miyuki	Singles match	9:24
3	Shinsuke Jet Wakataka and @Uexile defeated Yuji Hino and Bambi	Tag team match	13:56
4	Ryota Chikuzen defeated Hiro Tonai	Singles match	12:36
5	Shiori Asahi (c) defeated Kaji Tomato and Mentai☆Kid	Three-way match for the UWA World Middleweight Championship	19:33
6	Taka Michinoku, Hiroki and Quiet Storm defeated Kengo Mashimo, Saburo Inematsu and Ryuichi Sekine	Six-man tag team match	18:00
(c) / – the champion(s) heading into the match

== Sixth tour (2012) ==
The sixth tour took place on December 16, 2012, at the Hakata Star Lane in Hakata, Fukuoka.

Big Japan Pro Wrestling
No.	Results	Stipulations	Times
1	Amigo Suzuki defeated Yuichi Taniguchi	Singles match	6:51
2	Speed of Sounds (Tsutomu Oosugi and Hercules Senga) defeated The Brahman Brothers (Brahman Shu and Brahman Kei)	Tag team match	11:28
3	Ryuji Ito defeated Rory Mondo	Barbed Wire Board Deathmatch	9:44
4	Yuji Hino and Shinya Ishikawa defeated Yoshihito Sasaki and Kazuki Hashimoto	Tag team match	15:28
5	Strong BJ (Daisuke Sekimoto and Yuji Okabayashi) defeated Ōuetsu Reppan Dōmei (Shadow WX and Takashi Sasaki)	Tag team match	13:46
6	Abdullah Kobayashi, Masashi Takeda and Heisei Gokudō Combi (Kankuro Hoshino and Masato Inaba) defeated "Black Angel" Jaki Numazawa, Yankee Nichōkenjū (Yuko Miyamoto and Isami Kodaka) and Takumi Tsukamoto	Eight Weapons Double Ring Deathmatch	13:45

DDT Pro-Wrestling
No.	Results	Stipulations	Times
1	Michael Nakazawa defeated Hiroshi Fukuda	Singles match	4:10
2	Maki Narumiya defeated Neko Nitta	Singles match	7:41
3	Yuto Aijima, Azul Dragón and Yasu Urano defeated Makoto Oishi, Masa Takanashi and Yukio Sakaguchi	Six-man tag team match	12:21
4	Team Dream Futures (Keisuke Ishii, Soma Takao and Shigehiro Irie) defeated From the Northern Country (Antonio Honda and Daisuke Sasaki) and Batten Tamagawa	Six-man tag team match	10:55
5	Mikami and Tatsumi Fujinami (c) defeated Kota Ibushi and Gota Ihashi	Tag team match for the KO-D Tag Team Championship	14:59
6	Kenny Omega defeated Danshoku Dino, Harashima, Sanshiro Takagi and Hikaru Sato (Note: Order of eliminations: Sanshiro Takagi, Hikaru Sato, Harashima, Danshoku Dino)	Double Ring Five-way Elimination TLC (Table Ladder Castle) match	23:15
(c) / – the champion(s) heading into the match

Kaientai Dojo
No.	Results	Stipulations	Times
1	Eggplant Nasu defeated Tank Nagai	Singles match	9:36
2	Bambi defeated Apple Miyuki	Singles match	8:14
3	Ricky Fuji and Yusuke Ueda defeated Yuki Sato and Ayumu Honda	Tag team match	11:17
4	Yuji Hino, Taishi Takizawa and Saburo Inematsu defeated Ryoji Sai, Kengo Mashimo and Ryuichi Sekine	Six-man tag team match	18:24
5	Hiroki (c) defeated Uversyota	Singles match for the Independent World Junior Heavyweight Championship	15:38
6	Shinjiro Otani and Taka Michinoku defeated Shiori Asahi and Shinsuke Jet Wakataka	Tag team match	15:15
7	Shiori Asahi and Shinsuke Jet Wakataka defeated Shinjiro Otani and Taka Michinoku	Tag team match	4:41
(c) / – the champion(s) heading into the match

== Seventh tour (2013) ==
The seventh tour took place on December 15, 2013, at the Hakata Star Lane in Hakata, Fukuoka.

Big Japan Pro Wrestling
No.	Results	Stipulations	Times
1	Kankuro Hoshino defeated Takayuki Ueki	Singles match	6:46
2	Masato Inaba defeated Masaya Takahashi	Barbed Wire Board Deathmatch	10:27
3	The Brahman Brothers (Brahman Shu and Brahman Kei) and Onryo defeated Speed of Sounds (Tsutomu Oosugi and Hercules Senga) and Menso～re Oyaji	Falls count anywhere match	8:13
4	Yankee Nichōkenjū (Yuko Miyamoto and Isami Kodaka) (c) defeated 045 Junkie's (Jun Kasai and "Black Angel" Jaki Numazawa)	Iron Cage & Fluorescent Light Tubes Deathmatch for the BJW Tag Team Championship	14:57
5	Team Heavy Metal (Madoka and Shinya Ishikawa) and Ryuichi Kawakami defeated Strong BJ (Daisuke Sekimoto and Yuji Okabayashi) and Kazuki Hashimoto	Six-man tag team match	12:41
6	B Faultless Junky's (Masashi Takeda and Takumi Tsukamoto) defeated Ryuji Ito and Shuji Ishikawa	Mega Items & Kill Items Deathmatch	14:41
(c) / – the champion(s) heading into the match

DDT Pro-Wrestling
No.	Results	Stipulations	Times
1	Soma Takao defeated Akito	Singles match	7:20
2	Kyushu Selected Forces (Kota Ibushi, Yuto Aijima and Azul Dragón) defeated DDT Main Army (Masa Takanashi and Nuru Nuru Brothers (Tomomitsu Matsunaga and Michael Nakazawa))	Six-man tag team match	12:18
3	Antonio Honda defeated Batten Tamagawa	Singles match	7:45
4	Danshoku Dino, Makoto Oishi and Maki Itoh defeated Sanshiro Takagi and Toru Owashi	3-on-2 handicap match	11:44
5	Yukio Sakaguchi, Mikami and Tetsuya Endo defeated Urashimakudo (Harashima, Kudo and Yasu Urano) by referee stoppage	Six-man tag team match As a result, Sakaguchi also won the Ironman Heavymetalweight Championship from Harashima	13:50
6	Yankee Nichōkenjū (Yuko Miyamoto and Isami Kodaka) (c) defeated Team Dream Futures (Keisuke Ishii and Shigehiro Irie)	Tag team match for the KO-D Tag Team Championship	13:26
(c) / – the champion(s) heading into the match

Kaientai Dojo
No.	Results	Stipulations	Times
1	Ryuichi Sekine defeated Tank Nagai	Singles match	8:58
2	La Marcriada defeated Aoi Ishibashi	Singles match	9:28
3	Menso～re Oyaji and Mentai☆Kid defeated Hiro Tonai and Kaji Tomato	Tag team match	14:10
4	Ricky Fuji and Hiroki defeated @Uexile and Yuma	Tag team match	11:36
5	Taka Michinoku (c) defeated Shinsuke Jet Wakataka	Singles match for the Independent World Junior Heavyweight Championship	13:00
6	Little Galaxy (Makoto Oishi and Shiori Asahi) defeated Kinnōtō (Kengo Mashimo and Ryota Chikuzen)	Tag team match	20:13
(c) / – the champion(s) heading into the match

== Eighth tour (2014) ==
The eighth tour took place on December 14, 2014, at the Hakata Star Lane in Hakata, Fukuoka.

Big Japan Pro Wrestling
No.	Results	Stipulations	Times
1^{D}	Yuichi Taniguchi defeated Toshiyuki Sakuda	Singles match	6:06
2	Kazuki Hashimoto defeated Isamu Oshita	Singles match	6:19
3	Speed of Sounds (Tsutomu Oosugi and Hercules Senga) and Hideyoshi Kamitani defeated Atsushi Maruyama, Masaya Takahashi and Kota Sekifuda	Six-man tag team match	9:42
4	B Faultless Junky's ("Black Angel" Jaki Numazawa, Masashi Takeda and Takumi Tsukamoto) defeated The Brahman Brothers (Brahman Shu and Brahman Kei) and Takayuki Ueki	Six-man tag team match	12:44
5	Bozz Rengo (Saburo Inematsu and Ryuichi Sekine) defeated Heisei Gokudō Combi (Masato Inaba and Kankuro Hoshino)	Fluorescent Light Tubes Deathmatch	10:06
6	Kohei Sato and Ryuichi Kawakami defeated Strong BJ (Daisuke Sekimoto and Yuji Okabayashi)	Tag team match	12:26
7	Yankee Nichōkenjū (Yuko Miyamoto and Isami Kodaka) defeated Ryuji Ito and Abdullah Kobayashi	Barbed Wire Board & Block Deathmatch	12:26
D / – this was a dark match

DDT Pro-Wrestling
No.	Results	Stipulations	Times
1	Daisuke Sasaki and Saki Akai defeated Makoto Oishi and Tomomitsu Matsunaga	Tag team match	8:06
2	Akito, Mikami and Yuto Aijima defeated Team Dream Futures (Keisuke Ishii and Soma Takao) and Azul Dragón	Six-man tag team match	10:18
3	Super Sasadango Machine defeated Fishman and Yasu Urano	Three-way match	8:36
4	Gorgeous Matsuno and The Brahman Brothers (Brahman Shu and Brahman Kei) (c) defeated T2Hii (Sanshiro Takagi, Toru Owashi and Kazuki Hirata)	Six-man tag team match for the KO-D 6-Man Tag Team Championship	11:46
5	Kota Ibushi defeated Michael Nakazawa	Singles match	14:58
6	Happy Motel (Tetsuya Endo and Antonio Honda) defeated Shuten-dōji (Kudo and Masa Takanashi)	Tag team match	9:58
7	Yukio Sakaguchi defeated Harashima, Shigehiro Irie and Konosuke Takeshita	Four-way match	11:47
(c) / – the champion(s) heading into the match

Kaientai Dojo
No.	Results	Stipulations	Times
1	Bozz Rengo (Saburo Inematsu and Ryuichi Sekine) defeated Yoshihiro Horaguchi and Kotaro Yoshino by submission	Tag team match	9:02
2	Ricky Fuji and Aoi Ishibashi defeated Asosan and Bambi	Tag team match	10:49
3	Marines Mask III defeated Tiran Shisa	Singles match	7:52
4	Taka Michinoku, Ryota Chikuzen) and Shinsuke Jet Wakataka defeated HHHH (Yuji Hino, Hiroki and Hiro Tonai)	Six-man tag team match	16:26
5	Atsushi Maruyama (c) defeated Yuki Sato	Singles match for the Independent World Junior Heavyweight Championship	13:57
6	SFU (Kaji Tomato and Shiori Asahi) (c) defeated Magatsuki (Kengo Mashimo and Tank Nagai)	Tag team match for the Strongest-K Tag Team Championship	22:19
(c) / – the champion(s) heading into the match

== Ninth tour (2015) ==
The ninth tour took place on July 5, 2015, at the Hakata Star Lane in Hakata, Fukuoka.

Big Japan Pro Wrestling
No.	Results	Stipulations	Times
1	Yoshihisa Uto defeated Kazumi Kikuta	Singles match	6:53
2	The Brahman Brothers (Brahman Shu and Brahman Kei) and Takayuki Ueki defeated Speed of Sounds (Tsutomu Oosugi and Hercules Senga) and Shinobu	Six-man tag team match	12:41
3	Team Yamato (Daichi Hashimoto and Kazuki Hashimoto) defeated Atsushi Maruyama and Toshiyuki Sakuda	Tag team match	10:19
4	B Faultless Junky's ("Black Angel" Jaki Numazawa and Masashi Takeda) defeated Masaya Takahashi and Ryuichi Sekine	Barbed Wire Board Deathmatch	12:26
5	Daisuke Sekimoto and Ryuichi Kawakami defeated Hideyoshi Kamitani and Yuji Okabayashi	Tag team match	13:32
6	Abdullah Kobayashi and Yuko Miyamoto defeated Kankuro Hoshino and Ryuji Ito	Fluorescent Light Tubes Deathmatch	14:36

DDT Pro-Wrestling
No.	Results	Stipulations	Times
1	Smile Squash (Harashima and Yasu Urano) defeated Kazusada Higuchi and Kota Umeda	Tag team match	11:16
2	Soma Takao defeated Danshoku Dino and Suguru Miyatake	Three-way match	7:19
3	Tomomitsu Matsunaga, Mikami, Makoto Oishi and Azul Dragón defeated T2Hii (Sanshiro Takagi, Toru Owashi and Kazuki Hirata) and Yuto Aijima	Eight-man tag team match	10:57
4	Akito (c) defeated Masa Takanashi 3–0	Treasure Hunt Bullrope match for the DDT Extreme Championship	15:40
5	Golden☆Storm Riders (Kota Ibushi and Daisuke Sasaki) defeated Happy Motel (Antonio Honda and Konosuke Takeshita)	Tag team match for #1 contendership to the KO-D Tag Team Championship	16:15
6	Team Dream Futures (Keisuke Ishii and Shigehiro Irie) defeated Shuten-dōji (Kudo and Yukio Sakaguchi)	Tag team match	15:20
(c) / – the champion(s) heading into the match

Kaientai Dojo
No.	Results	Stipulations	Times
1	Kotaro Yoshino defeated Yoshihiro Horaguchi	Singles match	8:39
2	SFU (Bambi and Marines Mask III) defeated Yuma and Koharu Hinata	Tag team match	11:17
3	Ryuichi Sekine defeated Ricky Fuji	Pinfall Only by Kamikaze match	8:58
4	Alexander Otsuka defeated Taishi Takizawa	Singles match	11:00
5	Men's Teioh and Taka Michinoku defeated Magatsuki (Kengo Mashimo and Yuki Sato)	Tag team match	11:38
6	HHHH (Hiro Tonai and Yuji Hino) and Yuji Okabayashi defeated SFU (Kaji Tomato and Shiori Asahi) and Shinsuke Jet Wakataka	Six-man tag team match	21:16
