= List of Big Japan Pro Wrestling tournaments =

Big Japan Pro Wrestling has held a variety of different professional wrestling tournaments, mainly in deathmatch format, competed for by sports entertainers that are a part of their roster.

== Sporadic tournaments ==
=== BJW Junior Heavyweight Championship Tournament (1998) ===
The BJW Junior Heavyweight Championship Tournament was an eight-man single-elimination tournament conducted on March 2, 1998, to crown the inaugural BJW Junior Heavyweight Champion.

Quarterfinals
Yoshihiro Tajiri	Pin
Gran Naniwa
Minoru Tanaka	Pin
Minoru Fujita
Ryuji Yamakawa	Pin
Masayoshi Motegi
Gedo	Pin
Tomoaki Honma

Semifinals
Yoshihiro Tajiri	Pin
Minoru Tanaka
Ryuji Yamakawa	Pin
Gedo

Final
Yoshihiro Tajiri	Pin
Gedo

=== BJW Deathmatch Heavyweight Championship Tournament (1998) ===
The BJW Deathmatch Heavyweight Championship Tournament was held to crown the inaugural BJW Deathmatch Heavyweight Champion from June 8 to August 9, 1998.

Quarterfinals
Mitsuhiro Matsunaga	Pin
Jason the Terrible	14:29
Shadow Winger	Pin
Shoji Nakamaki	7:29
The Great Pogo	Pin
Kung Fu Lee	9:23
Shadow WX	Pin
Tomoaki Honma	16:22

Semifinals
Mitsuhiro Matsunaga	Pin
Shadow Winger	10:21
The Great Pogo	Pin
Shadow WX	15:02

Final
Mitsuhiro Matsunaga	Pin
The Great Pogo	8:36

=== Six Man Tag League (1998) ===
The Six Man Tag League was a round-robin tournament featuring five trios in a single block held between August 23 and September 6, 1998.

Final standings
Jason the Terrible, GK, and Mysterious Masked GK Jr.	5
Isao Takagi, Tomoaki Honma, and Yukinojo Echigo	5
Gennosuke Kobayashi, Ryuji Yamakawa, and Shoji Nakamaki	4
Kishin Kawabata, Masayoshi Motegi, and Shunme Matsuzaki	7
Daikokubō Benkei, Shadow WX, and Shadow Winger	7

Final
Jason the Terrible, GK, and Mysterious Masked GK Jr.	Pin
Isao Takagi, Tomoaki Honma, and Yukinojo Echigo	13:32

=== BJW Junior Heavyweight Championship Tournament (1999) ===
The BJW Junior Heavyweight Championship Tournament was a round-robin tournament for the vacant BJW Junior Heavyweight Championship held between June 14 and June 30, 1999.

Final standings
Masayoshi Motegi	9
Abdullah Junior Kobayashi	8
Men's Teioh	7
The Winger	7
Fantastik	7
Super Perro	4
Jun Kasai	0

Final
Masayoshi Motegi	Pin
Abdullah Junior Kobayashi	13:19

=== Grand Prix Tournament ===
The Grand Prix Tournament was a single elimination tournament which took place between January 2, 2000, and February 22, 2000.

Quarterfinals
Mike Samples	Pin
Daikokubo Benkei	10:12
Ryuji Yamakawa	Pin
Tomoaki Honma*	23:45
Crazy Sheik	Pin
Jun Kasai	7:53
Shadow WX	Pin
The Winger	12:28

Semifinals
Mike Samples	Pin
Tomoaki Honma	16:35
Crazy Sheik	Pin
Shadow WX	10:18

Final
Mike Samples	Pin
Shadow WX	10:36

- Yamakawa's BJW Deathmatch Heavyweight Championship was on the line.

=== Super J-Cup qualifying tournament ===
The Super J-Cup Qualifying Tournament was a tournament for junior heavyweight wrestlers with the winner qualifying for the 2000 Super J-Cup, representing BJW in the tournament. The tournament was held between February 23 and March 3, 2000.

Quarterfinals
Ryuji Ito	Pin
Men's Teioh	11:00
Masayoshi Motegi	Pin
The Winger	15:22

Semifinals
Guerrero del Futuro	Pin
Men's Teioh	13:02
Masayoshi Motegi	Pin
Fantastik	9:55

Finals
Men's Teioh	Pin
Masayoshi Motegi	8:50

=== 2000 World Extreme Cup ===
The 2000 World Extreme Cup was a round-robin tournament contested under deathmatch variations. The tournament consisted of three blocks with each block consisting of four wrestlers and a total of twelve participants in the tournament. The top three scorers of each block qualified for the knockout stage of the tournament.

Final standings
Block A		Block B		Block C	
Tower of Doom	6	John Zandig	6	Mike Samples	6
Ryuji Yamakawa	4	Crazy Sheik	4	Shadow WX	4
Mustafa Saed	2	Winger	2	Tomoaki Honma	2
Harley Lewis	0	Terry Bull	0	Wifebeater	0

Quarterfinals
Shadow WX
Tower of Doom
Crazy Sheik
Mustafa Saed
Tomoaki Honma
Mike Samples
Ryuji Yamakawa
John Zandig

Semifinals
Shadow WX
Crazy Sheik
Tomoaki Honma
John Zandig

Final
Shadow WX
John Zandig

=== BJW Heavyweight Championship Tournament ===
The BJW Heavyweight Championship Tournament was held between March 18 and March 20, 2001, to determine the inaugural BJW Heavyweight Champion.

Quarterfinals
Wifebeater	Referee stoppage
Ryuji Yamakawa	8:33
KAMIKAZE	Pin
Mad Man Pondo	6:33
Shadow WX	Pin
Daikokubo Benkei	8:48
John Zandig	Pin
Daisuke Sekimoto	7:12

Semifinals
Wifebeater	Pin
KAMIKAZE	5:50
Daikokubo Benkei	Pin
John Zandig	4:09

Final
KAMIKAZE	Pin
John Zandig	5:38

=== BJW Deathmatch Heavyweight Championship Tournament (2001) ===
A tournament was held to crown a new BJW Deathmatch Heavyweight Champion after previous champion Tomoaki Honma left the company in March 2001, thus vacating the title. The tournament was held between April 28 and May 4, 2001.

First round
KAMIKAZE
Jun Kasai
John Zandig
Mad Man Pondo
Abdullah Kobayashi
Kintaro Kanemura
Winger
Shadow WX

Quarterfinals
Justice Pain
KAMIKAZE
John Zandig
BYE
Kintaro Kanemura
BYE
Winger
Wifebeater

Semifinals
Justice Pain
John Zandig
Kintaro Kanemura
Winger

Finals
John Zandig
Kintaro Kanemura

=== Six-Man Maximum Tag League ===
The Six-Man Tag Team League was a round-robin tournament featuring four trios with each trio consisting of three wrestlers and the tournament featured six-man tag team matches. The tournament was held between October 15 and October 25, 2001. The tournament was won by the trio of KAMIKAZE, Hideki Hosaka and Shunme Matsuzaki.

Final standings
KAMIKAZE, Hideki Hosaka and Shunme Matsuzaki	5
Men's Teioh, Daisuke Sekimoto and Ryuji Ito (Men's Club)	4
Jun Kasai, Mad Man Pondo and Ruckus	2
Daikokubo Benkei, Abdullah Kobayashi and Naoki Numazawa (Skinheads)	0

=== 2002 World Extreme Cup ===
The 2002 World Extreme Cup was the second version of the World Extreme Cup tournament consisting of four blocks and four wrestlers in each block, a total of sixteen participants in the tournament. The top two wrestlers from each block qualified for the knockout stage of the tournament.

Final standings
Block A		Block B		Block C		Block D	
Tower of Doom	4	Homicide	4	Mamushi	6	Abdullah Kobayashi	6
Seiji Yamakawa	4	Bad Boy Hido	4	Kintaro Kanemura	4	Mad Man Pondo	4
Winger	4	2 Tuff Tony	2	O.D.D.	2	Biomonster DNA	2
Mike Samples	0	Shadow WX	2	Mark Manson	0	Axl Rotten	0

Quarterfinals
Winger
Homicide
Seiji Yamakawa
Bad Boy Hido
Shadow WX
Mad Man Pondo
Abdullah Kobayashi
Kintaro Kanemura

Semifinals
Winger
Seiji Yamakawa
Shadow WX
Kintaro Kanemura

Final
Seiji Yamakawa
Kintaro Kanemura

=== Hayabusa Cup ===
The Hayabusa Cup was a round-robin tournament which took place between April 14 and May 6, 2002. The tournament was held as a homage to Frontier Martial-Arts Wrestling superstar Hayabusa, who had recently retired from wrestling due to a severe injury which left him paralysed for the rest of his life.

Final standings
Ryuji Ito	8
Satoru Makita	8
Daisaku Shimoda	7
Katsumasa Inoue	2
Naoki Numazawa	2
Yuji Kamijo	1

Final
Ryuji Ito	Pin
Satoru Makita	10:39

=== Six-Man Tag Team Tournament ===
A knockout tournament was held on June 13, 2004, featuring six-man tag team matches.

Quarterfinals
Kengo Mashimo, Manabu Hara and Shiori Asahi
Kudo, Daichi Kakimoto and TA*KU
Hero!, Jaki Numazawa and Super-X
Kunio Toshima, Katsumasa Inoue and Mineo Fujita
Daisuke Sekimoto, Futoshi Miwa and Kyosuke Sasaki
Kazuhiro Tamura, Masanori Ishikura and Yuji Hino

Semifinals
Kengo Mashimo, Manabu Hara and Shiori Asahi
Hero!, Jaki Numazawa and Super-X
Daisuke Sekimoto, Futoshi Miwa and Kyosuke Sasaki
Shuji Ishikawa, Hajime Moriyama and Kent

Finals
Hero!, Jaki Numazawa and Super-X
Daisuke Sekimoto, Futoshi Miwa and Kyosuke Sasaki

=== Number 1 of Japan Tournament ===
The Number 1 of Japan Tournament was held on September 5, 2004.

Quarterfinals
Abdullah Kobayashi	Pin
Jaki Numazawa	11:05
Katsumasa Inoue	DQ
Shadow WX	9:08

Semifinals
Ryuji Yamakawa	Pin
Jaki Numazawa	7:47
Katsumasa Inoue	Pin
Daisuke Sekimoto	8:24

Finals
Jaki Numazawa	Pin
Daisuke Sekimoto	7:13

=== New Generation Battle Tournament ===
The New Generation Battle Tournament was a tournament held on January 9, 2005.

Quarterfinals
Daisuke Sekimoto	Pin
Kunio Toshima	10:02
Masanori Ishikura	Pin
Mineo Fujita	6:12
Kyosuke Sasaki	Pin
Jaki Numazawa	4:37
Manabu Hara	Pin
Hero!	5:32

Semifinals
Daisuke Sekimoto	Pin
Mineo Fujita	6:12
Kyosuke Sasaki	Pin
Hero!	12:01

Final
Daisuke Sekimoto	Pin
Hero!	12:32

=== Dainichi Dash ===
The Dainichi Dash was a tournament held on July 1, 2009.

First round
Takuma Obe
Ryuichi Kawakami
Daisuke Sasaki
Atsushi Ohashi
Shigehiro Irie
Satoshi Kajiwara
Shinya Ishikawa
Daisuke Masaoka

Second round
Takuma Obe
Masashi Takeda
Daisuke Sasaki
BYE
Shigehiro Irie
Yuji Okabayashi
Shinya Ishikawa
BYE

Semifinals
Daisuke Sasaki
Masashi Takeda
Yuji Okabayashi
Shinya Ishikawa

Finals
Masashi Takeda
Shinya Ishikawa

=== 1 Day Tag Team Tournament ===
The 1 Day Tag Team Tournament was a three-team tournament held on August 5, 2013.

Semifinals
Jaki Numazawa and Yoshihito Sasaki
No. 8 Right Takeda and Hoshino Japan
The Brahman Brothers (Shu and Kei)
The W*inger and La*Panda

Finals
Jaki Numazawa and Yoshihito Sasaki
The Brahman Brothers

=== 8-Man Tag Team Tournament ===
The 8-Man Tag Team Tournament was a deathmatch tournament featuring eight-man tag team matches on August 19, 2009.

Quarterfinals
Team 666 (Yuko Miyamoto, Onryo, Shinobu and Dynasty)
Young Chango Bloods (Chango, Yuki Sato, Atsushi Ohashi and Ryuichi Kawakami)
Death Match Champions (Shadow WX, Jaki Numazawa, Abdullah Kobayashi and Ryuji Yamakawa)
Death Match Young Bloods (Masashi Takeda, Isami Kodaka, Kankuro Hoshino and Mototsugu Shimizu)

Semifinals
Team 666 (Yuko Miyamoto, Onryo, Shinobu and Dynasty)
Strong BJ (Daisuke Sekimoto, Yoshihito Sasaki, Shinya Ishikawa and Yuji Okabayashi)
Death Match Champions (Shadow WX, Jaki Numazawa, Abdullah Kobayashi and Ryuji Yamakawa)
Team FREEDOMS (Jun Kasai, Takashi Sasaki, The Winger and Kamui)

Finals
Strong BJ (Daisuke Sekimoto, Yoshihito Sasaki, Shinya Ishikawa and Yuji Okabayashi)
Death Match Champions (Shadow WX, Jaki Numazawa, Abdullah Kobayashi and Ryuji Yamakawa)

=== D-Dash Tag Team Tournament ===
The D-Dash Tag Team Tournament was a tag team tournament held between November 3 and December 23, 2009.

Quarterfinals
Daisuke Sasaki and Yuki Sato
Satoshi Kajiwara and Amigo Suzuki
Yuji Okabayashi and Atsushi Ohashi
Ryuichi Sekine and Kim Nam Seok
Masashi Takeda and Takuma Obe
Shinobu and Taro Yamada
Shigehiro Irie and Shun Kasagi
Shinya Ishikawa and Ryuichi Kawakami

Semifinals
Daisuke Sasaki and Yuki Sato
Yuji Okabayashi and Atsushi Ohashi
Masashi Takeda and Takuma Obe
Shinya Ishikawa and Ryuichi Kawakami

Final
Yuji Okabayashi and Atsushi Ohashi
Shinya Ishikawa and Ryuichi Kawakami

=== BJW Tag Team Championship Tournament ===
A tournament was set up for the vacant BJW Tag Team Championship after previous champions Shinya Ishikawa and Yoshihito Sasaki vacated the titles due to Ishikawa suffering a leg injury. The tournament was held between March 19 and April 28, 2010.

Quarterfinals
Daisuke Sekimoto and Yoshihito Sasaki	Pin
Abdullah Kobayashi and Takashi Sasaki	19:11
045 Junkies (Jun Kasai and Jaki Numazawa)	Pin
Isami Kodaka and Masashi Takeda	19:46

Semifinals
Daisuke Sekimoto and Yoshihito Sasaki	Pin
Shuji Ishikawa and Yuji Okabayashi	17:56
045 Junkies	Pin
Ryuji Ito and Shadow WX	16:11

Finals
Daisuke Sekimoto and Yoshihito Sasaki	Pin
045 Junkies	21:11

=== Dainichi-X (2011) ===
The 2011 Dainichi-X was a round-robin tag team tournament which took place between February 2 and October 26, 2011.

Final standings
Abdullah Kobayashi and Yuji Okabayashi	13
Yoshihito Sasaki and Ryuichi Kawakami	13
Jaki Numazawa and Shinya Ishikawa	13
Kankuro Hoshino and Takumi Tsukamoto	13
Daisuke Sekimoto and Kazuki Hashimoto	13
Yuichi Taniguchi and Masked Genbei	6
Shadow WX and Atsushi Ohashi	6
Ryuji Ito and Masashi Otani	4

Semifinals
Yoshihito Sasaki and Ryuichi Kawakami	Pin
Kankuro Hoshino and Takumi Tsukamoto	12:44
Abdullah Kobayashi and Yuji Okabayashi	Pin
Jaki Numazawa and Shinya Ishikawa	15:13

Finals
Yoshihito Sasaki and Ryuichi Kawakami	Pin
Abdullah Kobayashi and Yuji Okabayashi	11:50

=== Dainichi-X (2012) ===
The 2012 Dainichi-X was a round-robin tournament with the top two teams advancing to the final round.

Final standings
Jaki Numazawa and Kazuki Hashimoto	10
Shinya Ishikawa and Jun Ogawauchi*	10
Ryuji Ito and Takumi Tsukamoto	9
Yoshihito Sasaki and Kankuro Hoshino	7
Shadow WX and Amigo Suzuki	6
Abdullah Kobayashi and Yuichi Taniguchi	5
Daisuke Sekimoto and Masashi Otani	2
Yuji Okabayashi and Hideyoshi Kamitani	2

Final
Jaki Numazawa and Kazuki Hashimoto	Pin
Ryuji Ito and Takumi Tsukamoto	13:18

- Jun Ogawauchi was a replacement for the injured Ryuichi Kawakami. Ogawauchi and Shinya Ishikawa replaced to compete in the final round and thus were replaced by the third ranked tag team in the tournament in the final round.

=== Strong Style Rising Tournament ===
The Strong Style Rising Tournament was a tournament held between May 24 and June 5, 2013.

First Round
Yuji Okabayashi	Pin
Madoka	9:52
Jun Ogawauchi	Pin
Jake Crist	7:06
Kazuki Hashimoto	Pin
Shinobu	11:38
Abdullah Kobayashi	Pin
Yoshihito Sasaki	10:01
Shinya Ishikawa	Pin
Yuichi Taniguchi	9:18
Atsushi Ohashi	Pin
Jack Anthony	6:32
Masato Inaba	Pin
Amigo Suzuki	7:43
D. J. Hyde	Pin
Ryuichi Kawakami	8:16

Quarterfinals
Yuji Okabayashi	Pin
Jake Crist	10:32
Kazuki Hashimoto	Pin
Yoshihito Sasaki	9:04
Shinya Ishikawa	Pin
Jack Anthony	10:28
Masato Inaba	Pin
Ryuichi Kawakami	9:05

Semifinals
Yuji Okabayashi	Pin
Yoshihito Sasaki	12:59
Shinya Ishikawa	Pin
Ryuichi Kawakami	12:31

Final
Yuji Okabayashi	Pin
Ryuichi Kawakami	17:55

=== BJW Junior Heavyweight Championship Tournament (2017) ===
A round robin tournament was held for the newly created BJW Junior Heavyweight Championship, distinct from the previous version.

Final standings
Kazuki Hashimoto	8
Shinobu	6
Tatsuhiko Yoshino	6
Toshiyuki Sakuda	4
Takuya Nomura	4
Yuya Aoki	2

Results	Kazuki Hashimoto	Shinobu	Takuya Nomura	Tatsuhiko Yoshino	Toshiyuki Sakuda	Yuya Aoki
Kazuki Hashimoto	X	Kazuki (12:56)	Kazuki (12:35)	Yoshino (11:57)	Kazuki (11:24)	Kazuki (8:09)
Shinobu	Kazuki (12:56)	X	Shinobu (9:38)	Shinobu (11:55)	Shinobu (9:28)	Aoki (7:11)
Takuya Nomura	Kazuki (12:35)	Shinobu (9:38)	X	Takuya (12:50)	Sakuda (10:38)	Nomura (7:13)
Tatsuhiko Yoshino	Yoshino (11:57)	Shinobu (11:55)	Takuya (12:50)	X	Yoshino (9:26)	Yoshino (8:02)
Toshiyuki Sakuda	Kazuki (11:24)	Shinobu (9:28)	Sakuda (10:38)	Yoshino (9:26)	X	Sakuda (9:22)
Yuya Aoki	Kazuki (8:09)	Aoki (7:11)	Nomura (7:13)	Yoshino (8:02)	Sakuda (9:22)	X

Final
Kazuki Hashimoto	Pin
Shinobu	13:18

=== BJW Junior Heavyweight Championship #1 Contender's Tournament ===
A tournament was set up to determine the #1 contender for Shinobu's BJW Junior Heavyweight Championship, taking place between June 13 and July 17, 2018.

Quarterfinals
Kota Sekifuda	Pin
Tsutomu Oosugi	9:35
Kazuki Hashimoto	Pin
Fuminori Abe	8:48
Yuya Aoki	Pin
Kankuro Hoshino	9:04
Hercules Senga*	Pin
Tatsuhiko Yoshino	2:17

Semifinals
Kota Sekifuda	Pin
Kazuki Hashimoto	6:57
Yuya Aoki	Pin
Banana Senga	5:49

Final
Kazuki Hashimoto	Pin
Banana Senga	11:57

- Hercules Senga changed his ring name to Banana Senga in the semi-final round.

=== 6-Man Sacred Ground City of Forest Sendai Tournament ===
The 6-Man Sacred Ground City of Forest Sendai Tournament was a six-man tag team tournament, in which the Yokohama Shopping Street 6-Man Tag Team Championship was defended. The tournament was held on August 5, 2018. The defending champions Abdullah Kobayashi, Ryuji Ito and Jaki Numazawa lost the titles to Masaya Takahashi, Takayuki Ueki and Toshiyuki Sakuda, who would successfully defend the titles in the final round to win the tournament.

Semifinals
Ryota Hama, Yasufumi Nakanoue and Yoshihisa Uto
Daisuke Sekimoto, Hideyoshi Kamitani and Daichi Hashimoto
Abdullah Kobayashi, Ryuji Ito and Jaki Numazawa (c)
Masaya Takahashi, Takayuki Ueki and Toshiyuki Sakuda

Finals
Ryota Hama, Yasufumi Nakanoue and Yoshihisa Uto
Masaya Takahashi, Takayuki Ueki and Toshiyuki Sakuda (c)

== Saikyo Tag League ==
Saikyo Tag League is a professional wrestling round-robin hardcore tag team tournament annually held since 1999.

=== Dates and venues of finals ===
Event	Date	City	Venue	Winner
1999	November 8, 1999	Sapporo, Hokkaido	Teisen Hall	Tomoaki Honma and Ryuji Yamakawa
2000	October 30, 2000	Tokyo	Korakuen Hall	Tomoaki Honma and Ryuji Yamakawa
2001	September 23, 2001	Tokyo	Korakuen Hall	Men's Teioh and Daisuke Sekimoto
2002	October 31, 2002	Yokohama, Kanagawa	Yokohama Red Brick Warehouse	Men's Teioh and Daisuke Sekimoto
2003	November 8, 2003	Tokyo	Korakuen Hall	Daikokubō Benkei and Abdullah Kobayashi
2009	May 28, 2009	Tokyo	Korakuen Hall	Masashi Takeda and Isami Kodaka
2011	November 22, 2011	Tokyo	Korakuen Hall	Daisuke Sekimoto and Yuji Okabayashi
2012	November 24, 2012	Tokyo	Korakuen Hall	Isami Kodaka and Yuko Miyamoto
2013	November 22, 2013	Tokyo	Korakuen Hall	Isami Kodaka and Yuko Miyamoto
2014	November 21, 2014	Tokyo	Korakuen Hall	Isami Kodaka and Yuko Miyamoto
2015	October 29, 2015	Tokyo	Korakuen Hall	Daisuke Sekimoto and Yuji Okabayashi
2016	October 31, 2016	Tokyo	Korakuen Hall	Daisuke Sekimoto and Yuji Okabayashi
2017	October 15, 2017	Tokyo	Korakuen Hall	Daichi Hashimoto and Hideyoshi Kamitani
2018	October 25, 2018	Tokyo	Korakuen Hall	Ryota Hama and Yasufumi Nakanoue
2019	November 26, 2019	Tokyo	Korakuen Hall	Yuji Okabayashi and Shigehiro Irie
2020	October 20, 2020	Tokyo	Korakuen Hall	Daichi Hashimoto and Hideyoshi Kamitani
2022	February 13, 2022	Tokyo	Korakuen Hall	Abdullah Kobayashi and Daiju Wakamatsu

== Ikkitousen Deathmatch Survivor ==
Ikkitousen Deathmatch Survivor is an annual professional wrestling round-robin hardcore tournament to determine the best wrestler of BJW's deathmatch division.

=== Dates and venues of finals ===
Event	Date	City	Venue	Winner
2011	April 18, 2011	Tokyo	Korakuen Hall	Takashi Sasaki
2013	April 10, 2013	Tokyo	Shin-Kiba 1st Ring	Ryuji Ito
2015	April 19, 2015	Sapporo, Hokkaido	Teisen Hall	Abdullah Kobayashi
2017	April 8, 2017	Sapporo, Hokkaido	Susukino Mars Gymnasium	Masaya Takahashi
2019	April 14, 2019	Sapporo, Hokkaido	Susukino Mars Gymnasium	Isami Kodaka
2021	June 8, 2021	Tokyo	Korakuen Hall	Drew Parker
2024	July 25, 2024	Tokyo	Korakuen Hall	Hideyoshi Kamitani

== Ikkitousen Strong Climb ==
Ikkitousen Strong Climb is an annual professional wrestling round-robin hardcore tournament to determine the best wrestler of BJW's Strong BJ division.

=== Dates and venues of finals ===
Event	Date	City	Venue	Winner
2012	March 26, 2012	Tokyo	Korakuen Hall	Yoshihito Sasaki
2014	July 26, 2014	Tokyo	Korakuen Hall	Shuji Ishikawa
2016	April 10, 2016	Sapporo, Hokkaido	Susukino Mars Gymnasium	Shuji Ishikawa
2018	April 15, 2018	Sapporo, Hokkaido	Susukino Mars Gymnasium	Hideki Suzuki
2020	April 26, 2020	Chiba, Tokyo	2AW Square	Daichi Hashimoto
2022	February 20, 2022	Tokyo	Korakuen Hall	Daisuke Sekimoto
2025	June 22, 2025	Tokyo	Korakuen Hall	Leyton Buzzard
