= Daikokubō Benkei =

Japanese professional wrestler and sumo wrestler

Kazumi Kotani
- 小谷一美
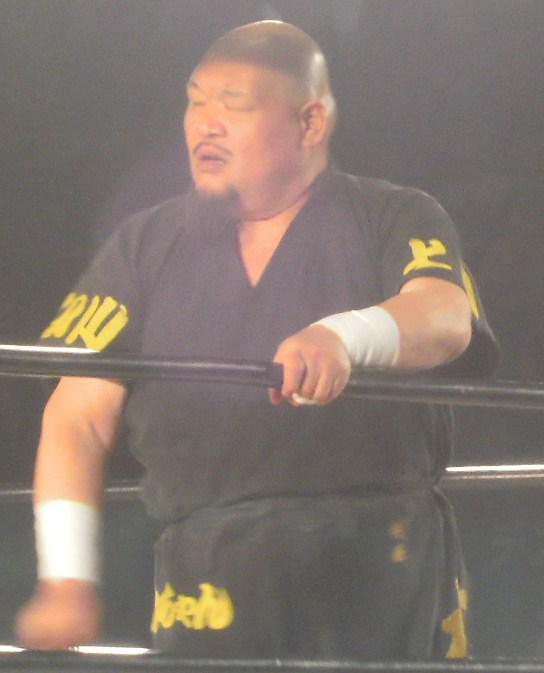
- Daikokubō Benkei in May 2010
- Born: April 3, 1957 (age 69); Hidaka, Japan
- Height: 190 cm (6 ft 3 in)
- Professional wrestling career
- Ring names: Daikokubō Benkei; Albany Benkei; Dunktane; Arashi
- Billed weight: 160 kg (353 lb)
- Debut: 1993
- Retired: 2011

Kazumi Kotani (小谷一美, Kotani Kazumi; born April 3, 1957) better known by the ring name Daikokubō Benkei (大黒坊弁慶) is a former Japanese sumo wrestler and professional wrestler best known for his time in the Japanese promotion Big Japan Pro Wrestling (BJW).

== Sumo career ==
Hanaarashi Kazumi
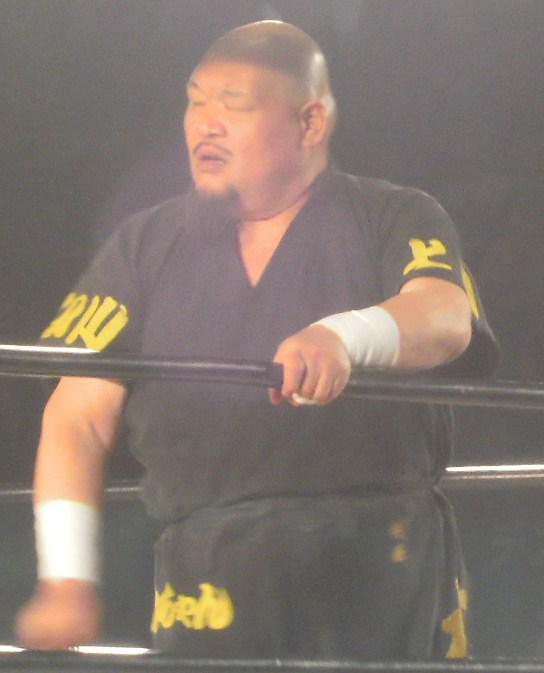

Personal information
- Native name: 花嵐 一美
- Born: Kazumi Kotani; 3 April 1957 (age 69) Hidaka, Japan
- Height: 1.88 m (6 ft 2 in)
- Weight: 154 kg (340 lb)

Sport
- Sport: Sumo
- University team: Nihon University
- Retired: November, 1985
- Heya: Hanakago
- Record: 138-125-6
- Debut: March, 1980
- Highest rank: Jūryō 9 (September, 1984)
- Updated on Sep. 2021

Kotani practiced judo in junior high school before switching to sumo wrestling after enrolling at Minabe High School. After high school, he received several offers from professional sumo stables, but decided to decline them and continued his amateur career at the collegiate level. He joined Nihon University's sumo club and in his fourth year, won the national student sumo championship to become college yokozuna.

After graduating from university, Kotani opted to turn professional and joined the Hanakago stable. He made his professional debut in the March 1980 tournament (honbasho). Due to his amateur accomplishments, he was granted makushita tsukedashi status which allowed him to make his debut at the bottom of the makushita division. Even though he was given this special dispensation, he still struggled to break through to the jūryō rank and was stuck in makushita for four years. After changing his ring name (shikona) to Hanaarashi (花嵐) in May 1982, he began to produce stronger results and was promoted to jūryō in March 1984.

Hanaarashi was only ranked in jūryō for a total of three tournaments. In his first tournament, he could only manage a 7-8 record after losing to Wakasegawa on the final day. Since he was ranked at the bottom of jūryō, he was demoted back down to makushita. Nevertheless, he returned to sekitori status in July 1984 and achieved a winning record. As a result he was promoted to the rank of jūryō 9, but could only manage 4 wins at that rank and was demoted from jūryō.

After losing his sekitori status, Hanaarashi remained in makushita for another year before announcing his abrupt retirement prior to the start of the November 1985 tournament. The reason for this was because the Hanakago stable closed down and he was not accustomed to living in a stable with so many wrestlers as all the personnel from Hanakago stable transferred to the Hanaregoma stable.

== Professional wrestling career ==
=== Early career ===
Kotani made his professional wrestling debut under the mask and name "Arashi" at WAR WAR-ISM ~2nd~, an event promoted by Wrestle Association-R (WAR) on November 11, 1993 where he defeated Yuji Yasuraoka. When he unmasked in late 1994, the name was given to former All Japan Pro Wrestling jobber Isao Takagi. Kotani also wrestled in the International Wrestling Association of Japan, and at IWA Japan WELCOME THE WORLD CHAMPION TOUR’97 on October 27 he fought Dan Severn in a losing effort.

=== Big Japan Pro Wrestling (1998–2011) ===
He participated in one of the longest matches in professional wrestling history, an 108-man battle royal at Tenka Sanbun no Kei: New Year's Eve Special, a cross-over event held between Big Japan Pro Wrestling (BJW), Dramatic Dream Team (DDT) and Kaientai Dojo (K-Dojo) from December 31, 2009, competing against notable opponents such as the winner Jun Kasai, Danshoku Dino, Great Kojika, Taka Michinoku, Kenny Omega, Tajiri, Gota Ihashi and many others. At BJW/OZ Academy Asahikawa Pro-Wrestling Festival, a cross-over event promoted by BJW in partnership with Oz Academy on September 22, 2009, he teamed up with Ryuji Yamakawa and Chikayo Nagashima to defeat Atsushi Ohashi, Manami Toyota and Yuichi Taniguchi in a six-person tag team match.

Kotani is known for competing in the promotion's signature events. One of them is the Saikyo Tag League, making his first appearance at the 2000 edition of the event where he teamed up with Shunme Matsuzaki, placing themselves in the Block A and scoring a total of two points after competing against the teams of Abdullah the Butcher and Shadow WX, Men's Teioh and Daisuke Sekimoto and Kamikaze and Abdullah Kobayashi. One year later at the 2003 edition, Kotani teamed up with Abdullah Kobayashi, placing themselves in the Block B and scoring a total of five points after competing against ODD and Homicide, Ryuji Ito and Daisaku Shimoda, Da Hit Squad (Mafia and Monster Mack) and Bancho Matsuzaki and Jaki Numazawa.

Kotani participated in other events such as the 2000 Grand Prix Tournament where he fell short to Mike Samples in a first-round match. At the BJW Heavyweight Championship Tournament from March 20, 2001, Kotani defeated Shadow WX in a first round match but fell short to John Zandig in the second round.

== Championships and accomplishments ==
- Big Japan Pro Wrestling

- BJW Heavyweight Championship (1 time)
- BJW Tag Team Championship (1 time) – with Abdullah Kobayashi
- WEW Hardcore Tag Team Championship (1 time) – with Abdullah Kobayashi
- Saikyo Tag League (2003) – with Abdullah Kobayashi

- DDT Pro-Wrestling

- Ironman Heavymetalweight Championship (1 time)

- Tokyo Pro Wrestling

- TWA World Tag Team Championship (1 time) – with Abdullah The Butcher

== Sumo career record ==
Hanaarashi Kazumi
Year	January Hatsu basho, Tokyo	March Haru basho, Osaka	May Natsu basho, Tokyo	July Nagoya basho, Nagoya	September Aki basho, Tokyo	November Kyūshū basho, Fukuoka
1980	x	Makushita tsukedashi #60; 6–1	East Makushita #35; 5–2	West Makushita #19; 5–2	West Makushita #10; 3–4	East Makushita #17; 4–3
1981	West Makushita #12; 3–4	West Makushita #18; 2–5	West Makushita #34; 3–4	West Makushita #42; 3–4	West Makushita #49; 4–3	East Makushita #37; 3–4
1982	East Makushita #46; 5–2	East Makushita #27; 2–5	West Makushita #43; 5–2	West Makushita #23; 4–3	West Makushita #16; 4–3	West Makushita #12; 4–3
1983	East Makushita #8; 3–4	West Makushita #15; 4–3	East Makushita #11; 5–2	East Makushita #4; 2–5	East Makushita #19; 4–3	East Makushita #13; 4–3
1984	East Makushita #7; 6–1	West Jūryō #13; 7–8	West Makushita #1; 4–3	East Jūryō #12; 8–7	East Jūryō #9; 4–11	East Makushita #5; 2–5
1985	East Makushita #22; 4–3	East Makushita #12; 4–3	East Makushita #9; 4–3	East Makushita #7; 4–3	East Makushita #5; 4–3	East Makushita #3; Retired; 0–1–6
Record given as wins–losses–absences Top division champion Top division runner-up Retired Lower divisions Non-participation Sanshō key: F=Fighting spirit; O=Outstanding performance; T=Technique Also shown: ★=Kinboshi; P=Playoff(s); Divisions: Makuuchi — Jūryō — Makushita — Sandanme — Jonidan — Jonokuchi Makuuchi ranks: Yokozuna — Ōzeki — Sekiwake — Komusubi — Maegashira
