= Toshiyuki Sakuda =

Japanese professional wrestler

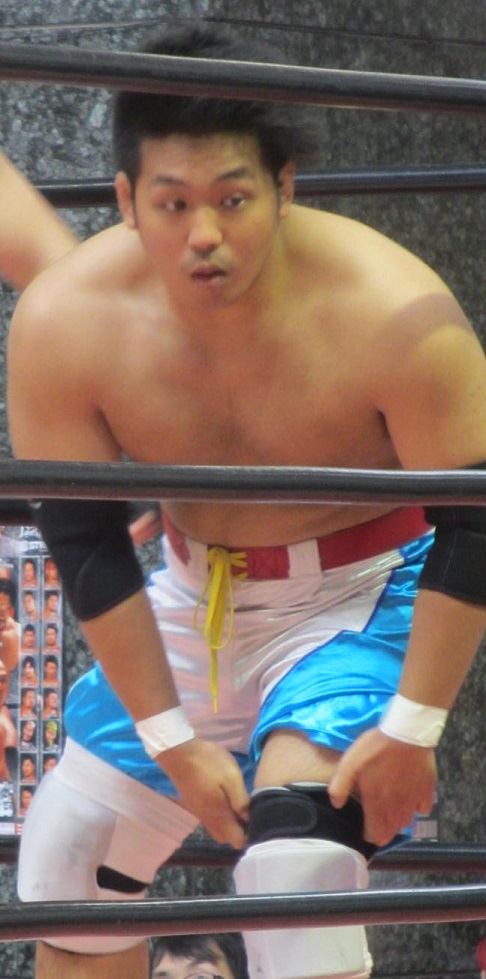
- Sakuda in June 2016

Personal information
- Born: August 25, 1991 (age 35) Nishihara, Japan

Professional wrestling career
- Ring name(s): Toshiyuki Sakuda; Little Panda
- Billed height: 155 cm (5 ft 1 in)
- Billed weight: 82 kg (181 lb)
- Trained by: BJW Dojo
- Debut: 2014

Toshiyuki Sakuda (佐久田俊行, Sakuda Toshiyuki) is a Japanese professional wrestler currently working as a freelancer and is best known for his time in the Japanese promotion Big Japan Pro Wrestling (BJW).

== Professional wrestling career ==
=== Independent circuit (2014-present) ===
As a freelancer, Sakuda worked for various promotions. At NOAH Pro Wrestling SEM In Kawasaki, an event promoted by Pro Wrestling Noah (Noah) on July 13, 2015, he teamed up with Daisuke Sekimoto in a losing effort to Brave (Muhammad Yone and Taiji Ishimori). On August 28, 2016, at Oz Academy Deigo No Hanasaku, Sakuda teamed up with Mitsuhisa Sunabe to defeat Gurukun Mask and Tida Heat. At the December 30, 2019 house show of Oriental Wrestling Entertainment, Sakuda teamed up with Masashi Takeda, Yuko Miyamoto, Takumi Tsukamoto to defeat Alex Zayne, Cima, Rekka and Elon.

At GCW Live Fast, Die Young, an event promoted by Game Changer Wrestling on February 3, 2020, he teamed up with Jimmy Lloyd and Drew Parker in a losing effort to Danny Havoc, Isami Kodaka and Matt Tremont as a result of a six-man tag team deathmatch. At Ice Ribbon Risa Sera's 5th Produced Show, an event promoted by Ice Ribbon on October 24, 2020, he challenged Risa Sera for the FantastICE Championship in a 10-on-1 Ironwoman hardcore handicap match also involving Hiragi Kurumi, Itsuki Aoki, Minoru Fujita, Takashi Sasaki and others which ended in a draw.

==== All Japan Pro Wrestling (2016) ====
Sakuda made brief appearances for All Japan Pro Wrestling (AJPW). At AJPW AJ Phoenix Vol. 4, an event promoted on August 31, 2016, he fell short to Atsushi Aoki in a singles match. At AJPW Super Power Series 2016 on May 21, he teamed up with Yoshihisa Uto in a losing effort to Axe Bombers (Kazuhiro Tamura and Takao Omori).

==== Big Japan Pro Wrestling (2014–present) ====
Sakuda made his professional wrestling debut at a house show promoted by Big Japan Pro Wrestling (BJW) on July 20, 2014, where he fell short to Isamu Oshita in a dark exhibition match. At BJW Dai Nippon Pro-Wrestling Ueno Convention on February 7, 2019, he participated in a 21-man royal rumble match also involving Tsutomu Oosugi, Yasufumi Nakanoue, Daichi Hashimoto, Hideyoshi Kamitani and others.

He is known for working in various of the promotion's signature events such as the Ikkitousen Deathmatch Survivor, making his first appearance at the 2017 edition of the event, placing himself in the Block A and scoring a total of two points after going against Takayuki Ueki, Takumi Tsukamoto, Ryuji Ito, Kenji Fukimoto and Isami Kodaka. Two years later at the 2019 edition, Sakuda placed himself in the Block B and scored a total of eight points after competing against Masashi Takeda, Takumi Tsukamoto, Minoru Fujita, Rickey Shane Page, Kankuro Hoshino and Takayuki Ueki. He fell short to Isami Kodaka in the semi-finals.

As for the Saikyo Tag League, Sakuda made his first appearance at the 2016 edition of the event where he teamed up with Ryuji Ito, placing themselves in the Deathmatch Block B, winning it with a total of four points after competing against Abdullah Kobayashi and Jaki Numazawa, Brahman Shu and Brahman Kei and Saburo Inematsu and Ryuichi Sekine, but fell short to Yuko Miyamoto and Isami Kodaka in the quarter-finals. Two years later at the 2018 edition, Sakuda teamed up with his "3rd Generation Chimidoro Brothers" stablemate Takayuki Ueki, placing themselves in the Deathmatch Block, scoring a total of four points after competing against Ryuji Ito and Ryuichi Sekine, Abdullah Kobayashi and Yoshihisa Uto, Masaya Takahashi and Kyu Mogami, Masashi Takeda and Takumi Tsukamoto, Yuko Miyamoto and Isami Kodaka and Minoru Fujita and Kankuro Hoshino.

He participated in various other side-tournaments. In 2017, he competed in a BJW Junior Heavyweight Championship Tournament to determine the inaugural champion, tournament won by Kazuki Hashimoto and also involving Shinobu, Tatsuhiko Yoshino, Takuya Nomura and Yuya Aoki.

== Championships and accomplishments ==
- Big Japan Pro Wrestling
  - Yokohama Shopping Street 6-Man Tag Team Championship (8 times) – with Masaya Takahashi and Takayuki Ueki
  - 6-Man Sacred Ground City of Forest Sendai Tournament – with Masaya Takahashi and Takayuki Ueki
- Pro Wrestling Freedoms
  - King of Freedom World Tag Team Championship (2 times) – with Takayuki Ueki (1) and Kyu Mogami (1)
  - Barefoot King Championship (1 time) – with Kyu Mogami
- Reaper Pro
  - Kiwi Death Championship (1 time, current)
