= Ikkitousen Deathmatch Survivor =

Professional wrestling tournament held by Big Japan Pro Wrestling

- Promotions: Big Japan Pro Wrestling
- First event: 2011
- Event gimmick: Round-robin tournament to determine the best wrestler of BJW's Deathmatch division

Ikkitousen Deathmatch Survivor is a professional wrestling round-robin hardcore tournament biennially held by Big Japan Pro Wrestling (BJW) to determine the best wrestler of BJW's deathmatch division. The tournament was first held in 2011. From 2011 to 2013, one top wrestler from each block qualified for the final round with the two facing in the final but the format was changed in 2015 when top two wrestlers from each block qualified for the knockout stage. An alternative tournament is held for the strong style division called Ikkitousen Strong Climb since 2012.

== List of winners ==
Year	Winner	Total won	Ref.
2011	Takashi Sasaki	1	
2013	Ryuji Ito	1	
2015	Abdullah Kobayashi	1	
2017	Masaya Takahashi	1	
2019	Isami Kodaka	1	
2021	Drew Parker	1	
2024	Hideyoshi Kamitani	1	

== 2011 ==
The 2011 Ikkitousen Deathmatch Survivor was held between February 6 and April 18, 2011.

Final standings
Block A		Block B	
Takashi Sasaki	8	Masashi Takeda	6
Jaki Numazawa	4	Jun Kasai	4
Isami Kodaka	4	Yuko Miyamoto	4
Shadow WX	4	Abdullah Kobayashi	4
Kankuro Hoshino	0	Drake Younger	2

Block A	Hoshino	Kodaka	Numazawa	Sasaki	WX
Hoshino	—N/a	Kodaka (12:16)	Numazawa (9:53)	Sasaki (13:02)	WX (13:48)
Kodaka	Kodaka (12:16)	—N/a	Kodaka (14:18)	Sasaki (16:40)	WX (14:00)
Numazawa	Numazawa (9:53)	Kodaka (14:18)	—N/a	Sasaki (14:51)	Numazawa (16:49)
Sasaki	Sasaki (13:02)	Sasaki (16:40)	Sasaki (14:51)	—N/a	Sasaki (13:35)
WX	WX (13:48)	WX (14:00)	Numazawa (16:49)	Sasaki (13:35)	—N/a
Block B	Kasai	Kobayashi	Miyamoto	Takeda	Younger
Kasai	—N/a	Kobayashi (19:05)	Miyamoto (22:12)	Kasai (21:13)	Kasai (16:53)
Kobayashi	Kobayashi (19:05)	—N/a	Miyamoto (15:09)	Takeda (12:01)	Younger (12:39)
Miyamoto	Miyamoto (22:12)	Miyamoto (15:09)	—N/a	Takeda (11:41)	Younger (13:55)
Takeda	Kasai (21:13)	Takeda (12:01)	Takeda (11:41)	—N/a	Takeda (12:10)
Younger	Kasai (16:53)	Younger (12:39)	Younger (13:55)	Takeda (12:10)	—N/a

Final
A1	Takashi Sasaki	Pin
B1	Masashi Takeda	21:43

== 2013 ==
The 2013 Ikkitousen Deathmatch Survivor was held between March 4 and April 10, 2013. The tournament final between Ryuji Ito and Isami Kodaka was a two out of three falls match, with the first fall being a Tables, Ladders and Chairs Death match, the second fall was a Fluorescent Lighttubes and Block Death Match and the third fall was a Nail Board, TLC, Fluorescent Lighttubes and Block Death match.

Final standings
Block A		Block B	
Ryuji Ito	10	Isami Kodaka	10
Yuko Miyamoto	8	Masashi Takeda	8
Drake Younger	6	Danny Havoc	4
Jaki Numazawa	4	Abdullah Kobayashi	4
Shadow WX	2	Saburo Inematsu	4
Kankuro Hoshino	0	Takumi Tsukamoto	0

Block A	Hoshino	Ito	Miyamoto	Numazawa	WX	Younger
Hoshino	—N/a	Ito (12:56)	Miyamoto (10:14)	Numazawa (12:26)	WX (12:44)	Younger (9:49)
Ito	Ito (12:56)	—N/a	Ito (17:26)	Ito (12:19)	Ito (11:41)	Ito (11:20)
Miyamoto	Miyamoto (10:14)	Ito (17:26)	—N/a	Miyamoto (11:25)	Miyamoto (13:53)	Miyamoto (13:23)
Numazawa	Numazawa (12:26)	Ito (12:19)	Miyamoto (11:25)	—N/a	Numazawa (8:29)	Younger (11:20)
WX	WX (12:44)	Ito (11:41)	Miyamoto (13:53)	Numazawa (8:29)	—N/a	Younger (12:14)
Younger	Younger (9:49)	Ito (11:20)	Miyamoto (13:23)	Younger (11:20)	Younger (12:14)	—N/a
Block B	Havoc	Inematsu	Kobayashi	Kodaka	Takeda	Tsukamoto
Havoc	—N/a	Inematsu (7:30)	Havoc (14:40)	Kodaka (12:24)	Takeda (11:15)	Havoc (11:21)
Inematsu	Inematsu (7:30)	—N/a	Kobayashi (11:14)	Kodaka (13:26)	Takeda (11:19)	Inematsu (8:52)
Kobayashi	Havoc (14:40)	Kobayashi (11:14)	—N/a	Kodaka (14:10)	Takeda (14:00)	Kobayashi (12:18)
Kodaka	Kodaka (12:24)	Kodaka (13:26)	Kodaka (14:10)	—N/a	Takeda (13:25)	Kodaka (12:00)
Takeda	Takeda (11:15)	Takeda (11:19)	Takeda (14:00)	Takeda (13:25)	—N/a	Takeda (14:52)
Tsukamoto	Havoc (11:21)	Inematsu (8:52)	Kobayashi (12:18)	Kodaka (12:00)	Takeda (14:52)	—N/a

Final
A1	Ryuji Ito	Pin
B1	Isami Kodaka	32:30

== 2015 ==
The 2015 Ikkitousen Deathmatch Survivor was held between March 1 and April 19, 2015.

Final standings
Block A		Block B	
Masashi Takeda	8	Isami Kodaka	8
Ryuji Ito	6	Abdullah Kobayashi	6
Kankuro Hoshino	6	Masato Inaba	6
Jaki Numazawa	4	Takumi Tsukamoto	4
Ryuichi Sekine	4	Saburo Inematsu	4
Masaya Takahashi	2	Takayuki Ueki	2

Block A	Hoshino	Ito	Numazawa	Sekine	Takahashi	Takeda
Hoshino	—N/a	Ito (12:50)	Hoshino (14:40)	Hoshino (11:35)	Takahashi (10:55)	Hoshino (13:22)
Ito	Ito (12:50)	—N/a	Ito (12:58)	Sekine (12:08)	Ito (11:26)	Takeda (13:14)
Numazawa	Hoshino (14:40)	Ito (12:58)	—N/a	Numazawa (10:34)	Numazawa (10:54)	Takeda (14:46)
Sekine	Hoshino (11:35)	Sekine (12:08)	Numazawa (10:34)	—N/a	Sekine (9:04)	Takeda (12:33)
Takahashi	Takahashi (10:55)	Ito (11:26)	Numazawa (10:54)	Sekine (9:04)	—N/a	Takeda (13:34)
Takeda	Hoshino (13:22)	Takeda (13:14)	Takeda (14:46)	Takeda (12:33)	Takeda (13:34)	—N/a
Block B	Inaba	Inematsu	Kobayashi	Kodaka	Tsukamoto	Ueki
Inaba	—N/a	Inaba (10:49)	Kobayashi (13:11)	Inaba (17:36)	Inaba (10:33)	Ueki (14:04)
Inematsu	Inaba (10:49)	—N/a	Inemetsu (17:17)	Kodaka (12:38)	Tsukamoto (10:49)	Inematsu (12:29)
Kobayashi	Kobayashi (13:11)	Inemetsu (17:17)	—N/a	Kodaka (17:46)	Kobayashi (14:18)	Kobayashi (13:40)
Kodaka	Inaba (17:36)	Kodaka (12:38)	Kodaka (17:46)	—N/a	Kodaka (15:45)	Kodaka (forfeit)
Tsukamoto	Inaba (10:33)	Tsukamoto (10:49)	Kobayashi (14:18)	Kodaka (15:45)	—N/a	Tsukamoto (9:50)
Ueki	Ueki (14:04)	Inematsu (12:29)	Kobayashi (13:40)	Kodaka (forfeit)	Tsukamoto (9:50)	—N/a

Semifinals
A1	Masashi Takeda	Pin
B2	Abdullah Kobayashi	13:03
B1	Isami Kodaka	Pin
A2	Ryuji Ito	15:10

Finals
B2	Abdullah Kobayashi	Sub
B1	Isami Kodaka	20:38

== 2017 ==
The 2017 Ikkitousen Deathmatch Survivor was held between March 5 and April 8, 2017.

Final standings
Block A		Block B	
Isami Kodaka	10	Masaya Takahashi	8
Kenji Fukimoto	6	Jaki Numazawa	6
Ryuji Ito	6	Masashi Takeda	6
Takumi Tsukamoto	4	Ryuichi Sekine	4
Takayuki Ueki	4	Yuko Miyamoto	4
Toshiyuki Sakuda	2	Kankuro Hoshino	2

Block A	Fukimoto	Ito	Kodaka	Sakuda	Tsukamoto	Ueki
Fukimoto	—N/a	Fukimoto (12:15)	Kodaka (11:17)	Fukimoto (10:10)	Fukimoto (11:04)	Ueki (9:29)
Ito	Fukimoto (12:15)	—N/a	Kodaka (13:53)	Ito (13:38)	Ito (10:06)	Ito (13:30)
Kodaka	Kodaka (11:17)	Kodaka (13:53)	—N/a	Kodaka (15:39)	Kodaka (13:47)	Kodaka (15:13)
Sakuda	Fukimoto (10:10)	Ito (13:38)	Kodaka (15:39)	—N/a	Tsukamoto (10:09)	Sakuda (11:20)
Tsukamoto	Fukimoto (11:04)	Ito (10:06)	Kodaka (13:47)	Tsukamoto (10:09)	—N/a	Tsukamoto (15:22)
Ueki	Ueki (9:29)	Ito (13:30)	Kodaka (15:13)	Sakuda (11:20)	Tsukamoto (15:22)	—N/a
Block B	Hoshino	Miyamoto	Numazawa	Sekine	Takahashi	Takeda
Hoshino	—N/a	Miyamoto (13:28)	Numazawa (15:14)	Sekine (13:14)	Takahashi (11:55)	Hoshino (13:43)
Miyamoto	Miyamoto (13:28)	—N/a	Miyamoto (8:10)	Sekine (12:41)	Takahashi (10:19)	Takeda (11:00)
Numazawa	Numazawa (15:14)	Miyamoto (8:10)	—N/a	Numazawa (10:23)	Takahashi (10:51)	Numazawa (13:07)
Sekine	Sekine (13:14)	Sekine (12:41)	Numazawa (10:23)	—N/a	Takahashi (11:49)	Takeda (10:30)
Takahashi	Takahashi (11:55)	Takahashi (10:19)	Takahashi (10:51)	Takahashi (11:49)	—N/a	Takeda (12:47)
Takeda	Hoshino (13:43)	Takeda (11:00)	Numazawa (13:07)	Takeda (10:30)	Takeda (12:47)	—N/a

Semifinals
A1	Isami Kodaka	Pin
B2	Jaki Numazawa	6:10
B1	Masaya Takahashi	Pin
A2	Kenji Fukimoto	10:06

Finals
A1	Isami Kodaka	Pin
B1	Masaya Takahashi	13:49

== 2019 ==
The 2019 Ikkitousen Deathmatch Survivor was held between February 28 to March 31.

Final standings
Block A		Block B	
Isami Kodaka	8	Masashi Takeda	10
Abdullah Kobayashi	8	Toshiyuki Sakuda	8
Jimmy Havoc	8	Takumi Tsukamoto	8
Ryuichi Sekine	6	Minoru Fujita	6
Ryuji Ito	6	Rickey Shane Page	6
Yuko Miyamoto	6	Kankuro Hoshino	2
Yoshihisa Uto	0	Takayuki Ueki	2

Block A	Havoc	Ito	Kobayashi	Kodaka	Miyamoto	Sekine	Uto
Havoc	—N/a	Havoc (9:50)	Kobaayshi (12:49)	Kodaka (11:56)	Havoc (9:47)	Havoc (8:21)	Havoc (10:11)
Ito	Havoc (9:50)	—N/a	Kobayashi (13:32)	Ito (12:41)	Ito (13:05)	Sekine (13:47)	Ito (6:23)
Kobayashi	Kobaayshi (12:49)	Kobayashi (13:32)	—N/a	Kodaka (13:35)	Kobayashi (13:06)	Sekine (8:49)	Kobayashi (16:08)
Kodaka	Kodaka (11:56)	Ito (12:41)	Kodaka (13:35)	—N/a	Miyamoto (13:47)	Kodaka (7:40)	Kodaka (11:18)
Miyamoto	Havoc (9:47)	Ito (13:05)	Kobayashi (13:06)	Miyamoto (13:47)	—N/a	Miyamoto (9:06)	Miyamoto (13:51)
Sekine	Havoc (8:21)	Sekine (13:47)	Sekine (8:49)	Kodaka (7:40)	Miyamoto (9:06)	—N/a	Sekine (8:28)
Uto	Havoc (10:11)	Ito (6:23)	Kobayashi (16:08)	Kodaka (11:18)	Miyamoto (13:51)	Sekine (8:28)	—N/a
Block B	Fujita	Hoshino	Page	Sakuda	Takeda	Tsukamoto	Ueki
Fujita	—N/a	Fujita (10:56)	Fujita (7:07)	Sakuda (11:33)	Takeda (11:02)	Fujita (10:24)	Ueki (11:18)
Hoshino	Fujita (10:56)	—N/a	Page (10:28)	Sakuda (12:14)	Takeda (9:56)	Tsukamoto (11:43)	Hoshino (10:04)
Page	Fujita (7:07)	Page (10:28)	—N/a	Page (9:25)	Takeda (7:45)	Tsukamoto (8:33)	Page (10:36)
Sakuda	Sakuda (11:33)	Sakuda (12:14)	Page (9:25)	—N/a	Takeda (16:06)	Sakuda (10:24)	Sakuda (11:14)
Takeda	Takeda (11:02)	Takeda (9:56)	Takeda (7:45)	Takeda (16:06)	—N/a	Tsukamoto (13:34)	Takeda (11:08)
Tsukamoto	Fujita (10:24)	Tsukamoto (11:43)	Tsukamoto (8:33)	Sakuda (10:24)	Tsukamoto (13:34)	—N/a	Tsukamoto (10:58)
Ueki	Ueki (11:18)	Hoshino (10:04)	Page (10:36)	Sakuda (11:14)	Takeda (11:08)	Tsukamoto (10:58)	—N/a

Semifinals
A1	Isami Kodaka	Pin
B2	Toshiyuki Sakuda	15:13
B1	Masashi Takeda	Pin
A2	Abdullah Kobayashi	13:34

Finals
A1	Isami Kodaka	Pin
B1	Masashi Takeda	16:43

== 2021 ==
The 2021 Ikkitousen Deathmatch Survivor was held between March 3 to June 28.

Final standings
Block A		Block B		Block C		Block D	
Violento Jack	6	Drew Parker	4	Ryuji Ito	4	Hideyoshi Kamitani	4
Masaya Takahashi	4	Takumi Tsukamoto	4	Masashi Takeda	4	Akira Hyodo	4
Abdullah Kobayashi	2	Shunma Katsumata	2	Kankuro Hoshino	2	Yuki Ishikawa	2
Jaki Numazawa	0	Yuko Miyamoto	2	Minoru Fujita	2	Isami Kodaka	2

Block A	Jack	Kobayashi	Numazawa	Takahashi
Jack	—N/a	Jack (15:01)	Jack (12:38)	Jack (11:58)
Kobayashi	Jack (15:01)	—N/a	Kobayashi (11:57)	Takahashi (12:26)
Numazawa	Jack (12:38)	Kobayashi (11:57)	—N/a	Takahashi (12:00)
Takahashi	Jack (11:58)	Takahashi (12:26)	Takahashi (12:00)	—N/a
Block B	Katsumata	Miyamoto	Parker	Tsukamoto
Katsumata	—N/a	Miyamoto (16:50)	Katsumata (12:11)	Tsukamoto (15:58)
Miyamoto	Miyamoto (16:50)	—N/a	Parker (15:57)	Tsukamoto (15:27)
Parker	Katsumata (12:11)	Parker (15:57)	—N/a	Parker (13:17)
Tsukamoto	Tsukamoto (15:58)	Tsukamoto (15:27)	Parker (13:17)	—N/a
Block C	Fujita	Hoshino	Ito	Takeda
Fujita	—N/a	Fujita (15:32)	Ito (13:54)	Takeda (13:05)
Hoshino	Fujita (15:32)	—N/a	Hoshino (13:32)	Takeda (13:57)
Ito	Ito (13:54)	Hoshino (13:32)	—N/a	Ito (11:33)
Takeda	Takeda (13:05)	Takeda (13:57)	Ito (11:33)	—N/a
Block D	Hyodo	Ishikawa	Kamitani	Kodaka
Hyodo	—N/a	Hyodo (15:53)	Kamitani (10:33)	Hyodo (16:14)
Ishikawa	Hyodo (15:53)	—N/a	Kamitani (14:02)	Ishikawa (12:15)
Kamitani	Kamitani (10:33)	Kamitani (14:02)	—N/a	Kodaka (13:35)
Kodaka	Hyodo (16:14)	Ishikawa (12:15)	Kodaka (13:35)	—N/a

Semifinals
C1	Ryuji Ito	Pin
D1	Hideyoshi Kamitani	12:56
A1	Violento Jack	12:15
B1	Drew Parker	Pin

Finals
C1	Ryuji Ito	13:25
B1	Drew Parker	Pin

== 2024 ==
The 2024 Ikkitousen Deathmatch Survivor, titled the "Ikkitousen Special League Deathmatch Straight Flash," was held between July 10 and 25, 2024.

Current standings
Block A		Block B	
Hideyoshi Kamitani	6	Daiju Wakamatsu	6
Mad Man Pondo	6	Dale Patricks	6
Abdullah Kobayashi	4	Yuki Ishikawa	4
Dr. Redacted	2	Beastman	2
Kazumi Kikuta	2	Ryuji Ito	0

Block A	Kamitani	Kikuta	Kobayashi	Pondo	Redacted
Kamitani	—N/a	Kamitani (11:54)	Kobayashi (12:01)	Kamitani (13:39)	Kamitani (12:44)
Kikuta	Kamitani (11:54)	—N/a	Kikuta (9:57)	Pondo (10:44)	Redacted (6:40)
Kobayashi	Kobayashi (12:01)	Kikuta (9:57)	—N/a	Pondo (11:48)	Kobayashi (10:39)
Pondo	Kamitani (13:39)	Pondo (10:44)	Pondo (11:48)	—N/a	Pondo (14:18)
Redacted	Kamitani (12:44)	Redacted (6:40)	Kobayashi (10:39)	Pondo (14:18)	—N/a
Block B	Beastman	Ishikawa	Ito	Patricks	Wakamatsu
Beastman	—N/a	Ishikawa (11:07)	Beastman (9:12)	Patricks (9:29)	Beastman (13:30)
Ishikawa	Ishikawa (11:07)	—N/a	Ishikawa (12:00)	Patricks (6:45)	Wakamatsu (12:39)
Ito	Beastman (9:12)	Ishikawa (12:00)	—N/a	Patricks (8:17)	Wakamatsu (10:46)
Patricks	Patricks (9:29)	Patricks (6:45)	Patricks (8:17)	—N/a	Wakamatsu (9:56)
Wakamatsu	Beastman (13:30)	Wakamatsu (12:39)	Wakamatsu (10:46)	Wakamatsu (9:56)	—N/a

Final
A1	Hideyoshi Kamitani	Pin
B1	Daiju Wakamatsu	18:24

== See also ==
- Ikkitousen Strong Climb
- Saikyo Tag League
- List of Big Japan Pro Wrestling tournaments
