= Drew Parker =

Welsh professional wrestler

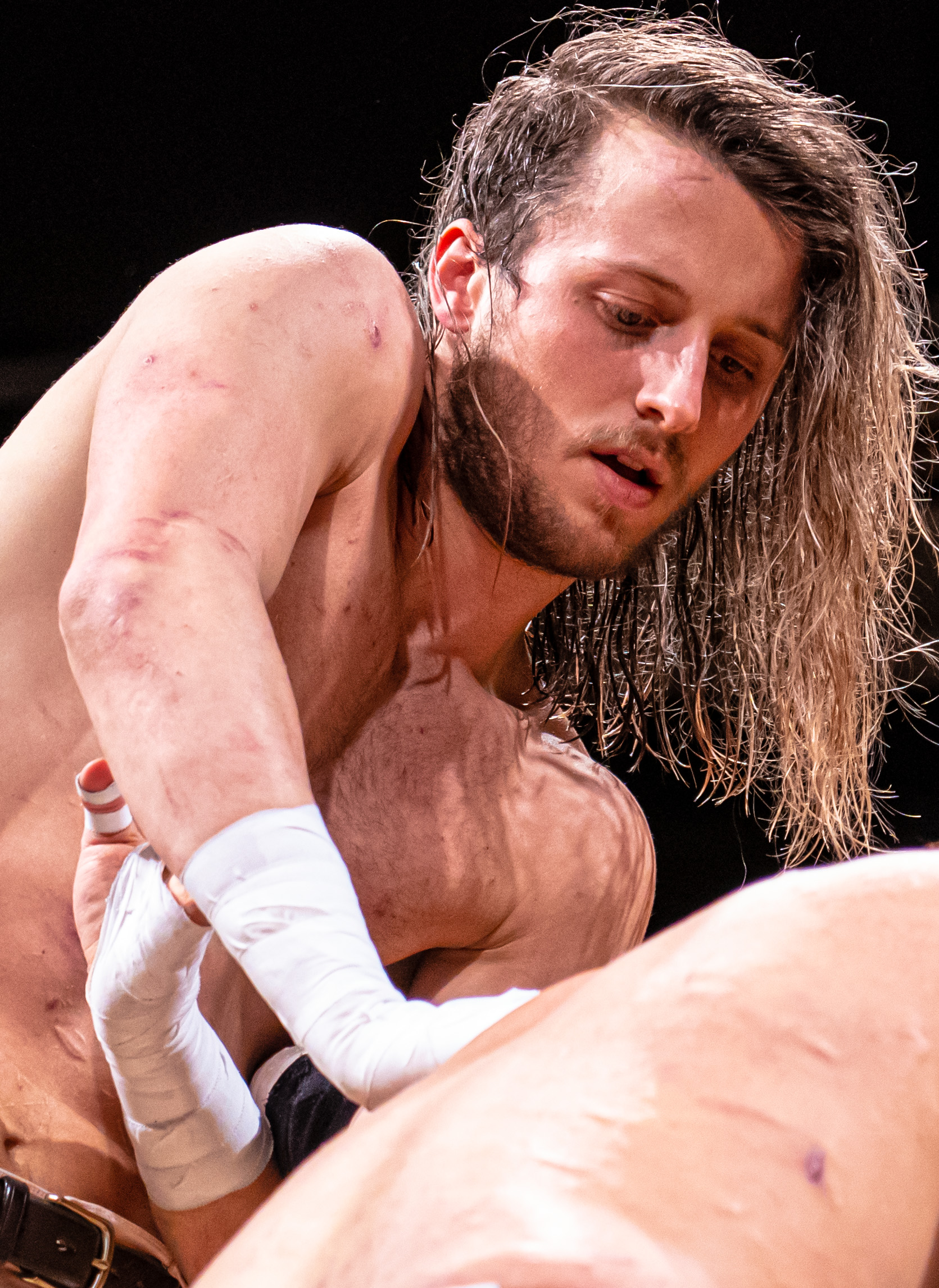
- Parker in 2020

Personal information
- Born: 29 December 1997 (age 28) Connah's Quay, Wales

Professional wrestling career
- Ring name(s): The Human Drewplex Machine; Tommy Drew-mer; Mike Drew-some; Rob Van Drew; ECDrew; Drew Parker
- Billed height: 174 cm (5 ft 9 in)
- Billed weight: 75 kg (165 lb)
- Trained by: Mike Roberts
- Debut: 2012

Drew Jacob Parker (born 29 December 1997) is a Welsh professional wrestler, He currently performs on the British independent circuit. He is best known for his tenure with the Japanese promotions Big Japan Pro Wrestling (BJW).

== Professional wrestling career ==
=== British independent circuit (2012–2019) ===
Parker made his professional wrestling debut in the British circuit and is known for his matches in various promotions. At ATTACK! Memento Mori, an event promoted by Attack! Pro Wrestling on 18 November 2018, he teamed up with Chuck Mambo as "Nothing To Prove" and unsuccessfully challenged Aussie Open (Kyle Fletcher & Mark Davis) and The Hunter Brothers (Jim Hunter & Lee Hunter) for the Attack! Tag Team Championship in a three-way tag team match.

=== Progress Wrestling (2017–2019, 2022) ===
He worked for Progress Wrestling, making appearances at their signature events such as the PROGRESS Chapter 76: Hello Wembley! from 30 September 2018, where he competed in a 20-man battle royal also involving Chris Ridgeway, Sid Scala, William Eaver and others. His last match for the promotion occurred on the second night of the PROGRESS Chapter 88: Super Strong Style 16 Tournament from 5 May 2019, where Parker teamed up with his "Do Not Resuscitate" stablemates Chuck Mambo, Spike Trivet and William Eaver, falling short to Jimmy Havoc, El Ligero, Mark Andrews and Mark Haskins in an eight-man tag team match.

=== Japanese independent circuit (2019–2021) ===
At GLEAT Fan Meeting In Sapporo, an event promoted by the Gleat promotion on 5 May 2021, Parker teamed up with Kota Sekifuda in a losing effort to Cima and Kaz Hayashi.

=== Big Japan Pro Wrestling (2019–2023) ===
Parker made his debut in Big Japan Pro Wrestling on 4 January 2019, at BJW Death Match Kings, event where he teamed up with Rickey Shane Page, falling short to Crazy Lovers (Masashi Takeda and Takumi Tsukamoto) in a Light tubes tag team deathmatch. Parker is a former Yokohama Shopping Street 6-Man Tag Team Champion, title which he won for the first time alongside Abdullah Kobayashi and Yoshihisa Uto by defeating 3rd Generation Chimidoro Brothers (Masaya Takahashi, Takayuki Ueki and Toshiyuki Sakuda) at a house show from 30 May 2019. He is usually competing in deathmatches but also does seldom in battle royals such as the one from BJW Ueno Park Convention on 1 February 2020, match which also involved Yuji Okabayashi, Brahman Kei and Brahman Shu, Yasufumi Nakanoue and others. At BJW/ZERO1/2AW Big Clash, a cross-over event produced by BJW in partnership with Pro Wrestling Zero1 and Active Advance Pro Wrestling on 7 April 2021, Parker teamed up with Yuya Aoki to defeat Ayame Sasamura and Tatsuya Hanami.

Parker made appearances in several of the promotion's signature events. At the 2020 Saikyo Tag League, he teamed up with Orca Uto, placing themselves in the Deatmhatch Block, scoring a total of four points after going against the teams of Masashi Takeda and Takumi Tsukamoto, Rickey Shane Page and Ryuji Ito, Abdullah Kobayashi and Kankuro Hoshino, Isami Kodaka and Yuko Miyamoto, Toshiyuki Sakuda and Yuki Ishikawa, and Masaya Takahashi and Takayuki Ueki.

At the 2021 Ikkitousen Deathmatch Survivor, Parker placed himself in the Block B where he defeated Takumi Tsukamoto, Yuko Miyamoto and Shunma Katsumata, and finally Ryuji Ito in the finals to win the tournament. As a reward, he received a shot to the BJW Deathmatch Heavyweight Championship, title which he won by defeating Takumi Tsukamoto at the BJW Korakuen Hall Tournament on 23 July 2021.

=== DDT Pro Wrestling (2020–2022) ===
One of Parker's first and most notable matches in DDT Pro Wrestling took place at DDT Get Alive 2020 on 7 September where he unsuccessfully challenged Chris Brookes for the DDT Universal Championship. He continued working for the company as a freelancer, making sporadic appearances at various shows such as DDT Who's Gonna TOP? 2020 from September 27 where he teamed up with Chris Brookes to unsuccessfully challenge Nautilus (Naomi Yoshimura and Yuki Ueno) for the KO-D Tag Team Championship.

Parker also works for the Basara branch of the promotion, making an appearance at DDT Ganbare Pro Joshi Pro-Wrestling ~ Kocho Ranbu 2021 on 24 April where he teamed up with Chris Brookes and Miyako Matsumoto to unsuccessfully challenge Asuka, Hagane Shinno and Shinichiro Tominaga for the GWC 6-Man Tag Team Championship.

=== American independent circuit (2018–2023, 2024 – present) ===
Parker started working in the American independent circuit in 2018, making an appearance in Combat Zone Wrestling's CZW Tournament of Death 17, where he fell short to Rickey Shane Page in a first-round match. At GCW Homecoming Weekend an event promoted by Game Changer Wrestling on 24 July 2021, Parker defeated Alex Colon in a Winner-takes-all match to win the GCW Ultraviolent Championship, his BJW Deathmatch Heavyweight Championship was also on the line.

=== Retirement (2023) ===
Parker announced his retirement after an independent wrestling event on August 21, 2023. The following day, Big Japan Pro Wrestling issued a statement, confirming the news and wishing Parker well on his future.

=== Return (2024–present) ===
Parker returned under a mask to attack Emersyn Jayne at TNT Extreme Wrestling's Going Off Big Time event on April 6, 2024. This led to an announcement of a match between the two scheduled for June 1, 2024.

== Championships and accomplishments ==
- Attack! Pro Wrestling
  - Attack! Championship (1 time, current)
  - Attack! 24:7 Championship (2 times)
- Banger Zone Wrestling
  - BZW Hardcore Championship (1 time, current)
- Big Japan Pro Wrestling
  - BJW Deathmatch Heavyweight Championship (2 times)
  - Yokohama Shopping Street 6-Man Tag Team Championship (2 times) – with Abdullah Kobayashi and Yoshihisa Uto
  - Ikkitousen Deathmatch Survivor (2021)
- TNT Extreme Wrestling
  - TNT Extreme Division Championship (1 time)
- Dragon Pro Wrestling
  - Dragon Pro Tag Team Championship (1 time) – with Ethan Silver
- Rixe Catch
  - Rixe Dur A Cuir Championship (1 time, current)
- Game Changer Wrestling
  - GCW Ultraviolent Championship (1 time)
  - Tournament of Survival 7
- Gleat
  - G-Infinity Championship (1 time) – with Chris Ridgeway
- Hope Wrestling
  - Hope 24/7 Hardcore Championship (12 times)
- Japan Indie Awards
  - Newcomer Award (2021)
- Pro Wrestling Chaos
  - Knights Of Chaos Championship (1 time) – with Mike Bird
- Brittania Wrestling Promotions
  - BWP Rookie Division Tag Team Championship (1 time) – with Ethan Silver
  - BWP World Tag Team Championship (1 time) – with Ethan Silver
- Pro Wrestling Freedoms
  - King of Freedom World Championship (1 time)
- Pro Wrestling Illustrated
  - Ranked No. 169 of the top 500 singles wrestlers in the PWI 500 in 2023
- Wrestle Island
  - Wrestle Island Championship (1 time, inaugural)
  - Wrestle Island Title Tournament (2017)
