= Takayuki Ueki =

Japanese professional wrestler

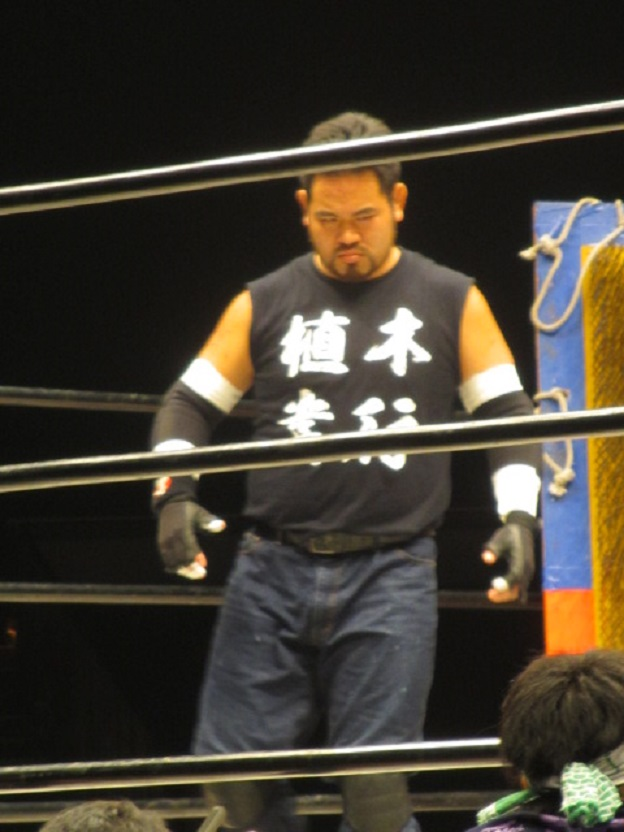
- Ueki in July 2017

Personal information
- Born: January 3, 1992 (age 34) Ōta, Japan

Professional wrestling career
- Ring name(s): Ueki no Manmade; Policeman Ueki; Takayuki Ueki; Kasako Ueki; Keikan
- Billed height: 170 cm (5 ft 7 in)
- Billed weight: 90 kg (198 lb)
- Debut: 2013

Takayuki Ueki (植木嵩行, Ueki Takayuki) is a Japanese professional wrestler currently working as a freelancer, predominantly for DDT Pro-Wrestling, where he is a former one-time KO-D 10-Man Tag Team Champion. He is best known for his time in the Japanese promotions Big Japan Pro Wrestling (BJW) and Pro Wrestling Freedoms (Freedoms).

== Professional wrestling career ==
=== Independent circuit (2013–present) ===
As a freelancer, Ueki is known for his appearances in various promotions. On January 5, 2014, at BJW/CZW CZW Arena In Japan ~ BJW For Masada, an event produced by Big Japan Pro Wrestling (BJW) and Combat Zone Wrestling (CZW), he teamed up with Hideyoshi Kamitani, falling short to Kazuki Hashimoto and Ryuichi Kawakami. At BJW/DDT Kumamoto Earthquake Reconstruction, an event produced by BJW in partnership with DDT Pro Wrestling (DDT) on July 2, 2016, to raise money for those affected by the Kumamoto Earthquake, Ueki teamed up with Brahman Kei, Brahman Shu and Danshoku Dino in a losing effort to Speed Of Sounds (Hercules Senga and Tsutomu Oosugi) and T2Hide (Kazuki Hirata and Sanshiro Takagi) as a result of an eight-man tag team match. At Ice Ribbon/Risa Sera Birthday, an event promoted by Ice Ribbon on November 19, 2016, he competed in a 60-minute ironwoman match also involving Tsukasa Fujimoto, Tsukushi, Miyako Matsumoto and Risa Sera which ended in a time-limit draw. At BJW/Zero1 Big One Jam, an event produced by BJW in partnership with Pro Wrestling Zero1 on June 7, 2019, Ueki teamed up with his Masaya Takahashi and Toshiyuki Sakuda as the "3rd Generation Chimidoro Brothers" in a losing effort to Ikuto Hidaka, Masato Tanaka and Takuya Sugawara.

==== All Japan Pro Wrestling (2016–present) ====
Ueki is also known for his tenure with All Japan Pro Wrestling (AJPW). At AJPW New Year Wars 2021 on January 2, he competed in a 22-man battle royal won by The Bodyguard and also involving Shotaro Ashino, Shigehiro Irie, Tajiri, Takao Omori and others.

He is known for competing in the promotion's signature events such as the AJPW Junior Tag League, making his first appearance in the 2020 edition of the event where he teamed up with Francesco Akira falling short to Jin (Koji Iwamoto and Fuminori Abe) in the first round.

==== Big Japan Pro Wrestling (2013–present) ====
Ueki made his professional wrestling debut at a house show promoted by Big Japan Pro Wrestling (BJW) on October 27, 2013, where he fell short to Yuichi Taniguchi in an exhibition match.

He is known for competing in various of the promotion's signature events such as the Ikkitousen Deathmatch Survivor, making his first appearance at the 2015 edition of the event where he placed himself in the Block B, scoring a total of two points after competing against Isami Kodaka, Abdullah Kobayashi, Masato Inaba, Takumi Tsukamoto and Saburo Inematsu. His latest matches occurred at the 2019 edition where he fought in the Block B scoring a total of two points after going against Masashi Takeda, Toshiyuki Sakuda, Takumi Tsukamoto, Minoru Fujita, Rickey Shane Page and Kankuro Hoshino.

As for the Saikyo Tag League, he made his first appearance at the 2015 edition of the event where he teamed up with Abdullah Kobayashi, placing themselves in the Deathmatch Block, scoring a total of six points after competing against Ryuji Ito and Ryuichi Sekine, Kankuro Hoshino and Masato Inaba, Isami Kodaka and Yuko Miyamoto, Jaki Numazawa and Takumi Tsukamoto and Brahman Shu and Brahman Kei. His latest matches occurred at the 2019 edition where he teamed up with his "3rd Generation Chimidoro Brothers" stablemate Masaya Takahashi in the Deathmatch Block where they scored a total of two points after going against Drew Parker and Orca Uto, Toshiyuki Sakuda and Yuki Ishikawa and others.

He participated in side events such as the 6-Man Sacred Ground City of Forest Sendai Tournament from August 5, 2018, which he won by teaming up with Toshiyuki Sakuda and Masaya Takahashi defeating Ryota Hama, Yasufumi Nakanoue and Yoshihisa Uto in the finals.

== Championships and accomplishments ==
- All Japan Pro Wrestling
  - AJPW TV Six-Man Tag Team Championship (1 time) – with Yoshitatsu and Seigo Tachibana
- Big Japan Pro Wrestling
  - Yokohama Shopping Street 6-Man Tag Team Championship (10 times) – with Masaya Takahashi and Toshiyuki Sakuda (8), Abdullah Kobayashi and Masaya Takahashi (1) and Brahman Kei and Brahman Shu (1)
  - Sakatako Intercontinental Tag Team Championship (1 time) – with Abdullah Kobayashi
  - 6-Man Sacred Ground City of Forest Sendai Tournament (2015) – with Masaya Takahashi and Toshiyuki Sakuda
- DDT Pro-Wrestling
  - KO-D 10-Man Tag Team Championship (1 time) – with Antonio Honda, Masahiro Takanashi, Takeshi Masada and Mecha Mummy
- Deathmatch Innovative Element
  - DIE Asian Deathmatch Championship (1 time, inaugural, current)
  - Shigurui Tournament (2025)
- Pro Wrestling Freedoms
  - King of Freedom World Tag Team Championship (1 time) – with Toshiyuki Sakuda
  - Barefoot King Championship (7 times) – with Kentaro Hachisu (2)
