= Masaya Takahashi =

Japanese professional wrestler (born 1986)

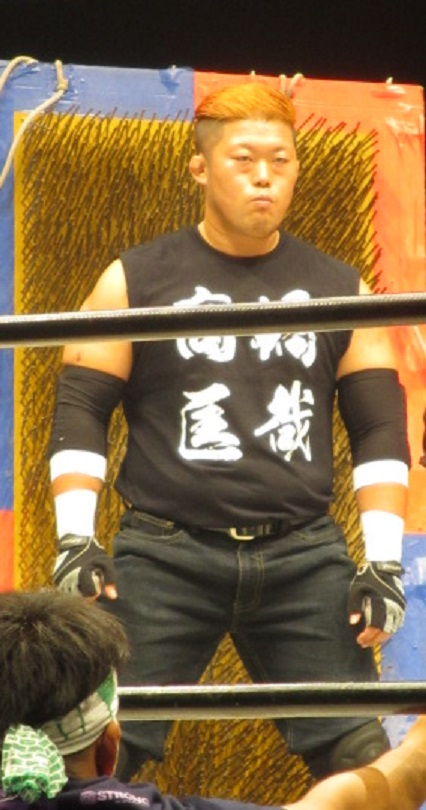
- Takahashi in July 2017

Personal information
- Born: October 14, 1986 (age 40) Koto City, Tokyo, Japan

Professional wrestling career
- Ring name(s): Hoshito Takahashi; Masaya Takahashi
- Billed height: 1.70 m (5 ft 7 in)
- Billed weight: 100 kg (220 lb)
- Trained by: Yoshihiro Tajiri
- Debut: May 24, 2012

Masaya Takahashi (高橋 匡哉 Takahashi Masaya, born October 14, 1986) is a Japanese professional wrestler currently signed to Big Japan Pro Wrestling in the deathmatch division. He is a former two-time BJW Deathmatch Heavyweight Champion and nine-time Yokohama Shopping Street 6-Man Tag Team Champion. He also won the 2017 Ikkitousen Deathmatch Survivor.

== Professional wrestling career ==
=== Early career ===
Masaya Takahashi was trained by former WWE wrestler Tajiri and was due to debut for Smash in May 2012 but the promotion closed down in March due to financial issues. He followed Tajiri to his new promotion Wrestling New Classic and participated in an exhibition bout at WNC's first show on April 26. Prior to his official debut, he claimed to be abducted by aliens and changed his name to Hoshito Takahashi (高橋 星人, Takahashi Hoshito; lit. "Starman Takahashi"). On May 24, he defeated 15 year veteran Takuya Kito with assistance from referee Soft Imai. He went on to win 12 consecutive singles matches whilst seemingly being possessed by an alien. On August 30, Takahashi suffered his first singles loss after being defeated by Veneno and woke up from his possession. Since then, he has reverted to his real name Masaya Takahashi.

Takahashi remained with WNC until its closure on June 26, 2014. Takahashi and several other former WNC wrestlers would form phoenix promotion Asuka Project and held their first show on April 23 which saw Takahashi lose to Hikaru Sato. He participated in the Asuka Project section of the 24 Hours Pro-Wrestling event at Shunjuku Face held on July 25 and 26; he unsuccessfully challenged Isami Kodaka for the Independent World Junior Heavyweight Championship. He left the promotion in August 2017 to sign full time with Big Japan Pro Wrestling.

=== Big Japan Pro Wrestling (2013–present) ===
Takahashi debuted for Big Japan Pro Wrestling (BJW) on February 4, 2013, teaming with Kazuki Hashimoto in a losing effort against Shadow WX and Takashi Sasaki. Having wrestled basic hardcore matches, his deathmatch debut came on July 2, teaming with Ryuji Ito and losing to Kankuro Hoshino and Masato Inaba. From September 1 to November 24, Takahashi underwent a seven match deathmatch trail series which saw him wrestle Masashi Takeda, Ryuji Ito, Takashi Sasaki, Isami Kodaka, Yuko Miyamoto, Jaki Numazawa and Jun Kasai in singles matches. He was unable to win any of his matches but it was no doubt influential in the Japan Indie Awards awarding him the Newcomer Award for 2013. He continued wrestling deathmatches for experience in 2014 and 2015. He entered the 2015 Ikkitousen Deathmatch Survivor tournament and finished last in the A Block but managed to score a win over veteran Kankuro Hoshino. On March 31, Takahashi pinned Abdullah Kobayashi in an eight man tag team match and immediately requested a BJW Deathmatch Heavyweight Championship shot from Ryuji Ito. At Endless Survivor, on May 5, Takahashi lost to Ryuji Ito. Afterwards, he would form a tag team with Takayuki Ueki known as the Third Generation Chimidoro Brothers (三代目血みどろブラザーズ, Sandai-me Chimidoro Burazāzu). At Ryōgokutan 2016, BJW's annual Ryōgoku Kokugikan show, on July 24, the Third Generation Chimidoro Brothers won the vacant Yokohama Shopping Street 6-Man Tag Team Championship with Abdullah Kobayashi. From September 4 and October 31, the Third Generation Chimidoro Brothers participated in the 2016 Saikyo Tag League and finished runner up in the Deathmatch Block A, moving onto the quarterfinals. During the group stages, Takahashi unsuccessfully challenged BJW Deathmatch Heavyweight Champion Kankuro Hoshino on September 11. After defeating Abdullah Kobayashi and Jaki Numazawa in the quarterfinals, they lost to Yankee Nichokenju (Isami Kodaka and Yuko Miyamoto) in the semifinals.

In February 2017, Takahashi was announced to participate in the 2017 Ikkitousen Deathmatch Survivor as part of the B Block. He won four out of his five block matches, advancing to the semifinals. On April 8, Takahashi defeated Kenji Fukimoto and went on to defeat Isami Kodaka in the main event to win the tournament. His success continued at Endless Survivor 2017, on May 5, where he defeated Abdullah Kobayashi in a spike nails & 150 light tubes deathmatch for the BJW Deathmatch Heavyweight Championship. Ten days later however, he lost the Yokohama Shopping Street 6-Man Tag Team Championship to Moon Vulcan (Hideki Suzuki, Takuya Nomura and Yoshihisa Uto). On June 10, after making his first successful title defence against Takumi Tsukamoto, Takahashi nominated his tag team partner Takayuki Ueki as his next title challenger at Ryōgokutan 2017. On July 17, Takahashi successfully defended his BJW Deathmatch Heavyweight Championship against Ueki. After the match, he announced that he had officially signed with BJW as a permanent member of the Deathmatch BJ division. On August 11, the Third Generation Chimidoro Brothers unsuccessfully challenged Abdullah Kobayashi and Ryuji Ito for the BJW Tag Team Championship. Takahashi's BJW Deathmatch Heavyweight Championship reign came to an end on August 19 when he lost to Masashi Takeda in a light tubes & double glass board deathmatch. He attempted to regain the title from Takeda on December 17 but lost. Despite missing out on the title, Takahashi ended his career year by winning the Best Bout Award from the Japan Indie Awards for his December 17 match against Takeda.

In 2018, Toshiyuki Sakuda joined Takahashi and Ueki as the third member of the Third Generation Chimidoro Brothers. On July 24, the trio defeated Ryota Hama, Yasufumi Nakanoue and Yoshihisa Uto to win the Yokohama Shopping Street 6-Man Tag Team Championship. They lost the titles to Abdullah Kobayashi, Jaki Numazawa and Ryuji Ito on August 4 but regained them the following day. In October, they lost and regained the titles on two further occasions before losing the titles on October 19 to Ryota Hama, Takeshi Irei and Yasufumi Nakanoue. At Ryōgokutan 2018, on November 11, he defeated Takeda to win his second BJW Deathmatch Heavyweight Championship. Six days later, the Third Generation Chimidoro Brothers regained the Yokohama Shopping Street 6-Man Tag Team Championship. In January 2019, Takahashi defended the BJW Deathmatch Heavyweight Championship on three occasions, defeating Takumi Tsukamoto on January 2, Ryuji Ito on January 14, and Isami Kodaka on January 27. On March 10, the Third Generation Chimidoro Brothers lost the Yokohama Shopping Street 6-Man Tag Team Championship to Abdullah Kobayashi, Hideki Suzuki and Yoshihisa Uto. As Deathmatch Champion, Takahashi elected not to participate in the 2019 Ikkitousen Deathmatch Survivor and instead would enter an All Japan Pro Wrestling tournament for the All Asia Tag Team Championship. On March 21, Takahashi and Ueki lost to eventual winners Jake Lee and Koji Iwamoto in the tournament semifinals. Back in BJW, Takahashi lost the BJW Deathmatch Heavyweight Championship to Ikkitousen Deathmatch Survivor winner Isami Kodaka on May 5. He bounced back with the Third Generation Chimidoro Brothers, winning the Yokohama Shopping Street 6-Man Tag Team Championship on May 30. Over the coming months, they'd lose and regain the titles on a further two occasions, becoming eight-time champions. On September 1, Takahashi and Ueki entered the 2019 Saikyo Tag League as part of the Deathmatch Block, winning their first match. On September 9, Ueki suffered a leg injury during a match that would keep him out for a calendar year; the Third Generation Chimidoro Brothers were forced to vacate the Yokohama Shopping Street 6-Man Tag Team Championship and pull out of the Saikyo Tag League.

Takahashi had a quiet 2020, due in part to the COVID-19 pandemic and its effect on sporting events. On September 9, Takayuki Ueki returned from injury and the Third Generation Chimidoro Brothers lost his return match to Abdullah Kobayashi, Jaki Numazawa and Ryuji Ito. Takahashi and Ueki entered a knock-out variant of the Saikyo Tag League, making it to the second round before being defeated by Ryuji Ito and Shunma Katsumata. On October 8, Sakuda and Ueki announced their departure from BJW and the dissolution of the Third Generation Chimidoro Brothers, effective November 13. At Chimidoro Last Stand, the trio lost their final match to Abdullah Kobayashi, Isami Kodaka and Yuko Miyamoto. Without Sakuda and Ueki, Takahashi's career cratered over the next two years, leading to him planning to take an "indefinite leave of absence" effective from December 31, 2022.

== Personal life ==
Takahashi has a son born November 8, 2018. In November 2022, he was diagnosed with Stevens–Johnson syndrome.

== Championships and accomplishments ==
- Big Japan Pro Wrestling
  - BJW Deathmatch Heavyweight Championship (2 times)
  - BJW Tag Team Championship (1 time) – with Sagat
  - Yokohama Shopping Street 6-Man Tag Team Championship (9 times) – with Abdullah Kobayashi and Takayuki Ueki (1), and Takayuki Ueki and Toshiyuki Sakuda (8)
  - Ikkitousen Deathmatch Survivor (2017)
  - 6-Man Sacred Ground City of Forest Sendai Tournament (2018) – with Takayuki Ueki and Toshiyuki Sakuda
- Japan Indie Awards
  - Newcomer Award (2013)
  - Best Bout Award (2017) vs. Masashi Takeda on December 17
