= Shigehiro =

- Gender: Male

Origin
- Origin: Japanese
- Meaning: Different meanings depending on the kanji used

Shigehiro (written: 重煕, 茂弘, 繁浩, 成浩 or 繁博) is a masculine Japanese given name. Notable people with the name include:

- Shigehiro Hagisaki (萩嵜 繁博; born 1962), Japanese military officer and spy
- Maeda Shigehiro (前田 重煕; 1729–1753), Japanese daimyō
- Shigehiro Ozawa (小沢 茂弘; 1922–2004), Japanese film director and screenwriter
- Shigehiro Taguchi (田口 成浩; born 1990), Japanese basketball player
- Shigehiro Takahashi (高橋 繁浩; born 1961), Japanese swimmer

Shigehiro (written: 重廣) is also a Japanese surname. Notable people with the surname include:

- Takuya Shigehiro (重廣 卓也; born 1995), Japanese footballer
