= Abdullah Kobayashi =

Japanese professional wrestler

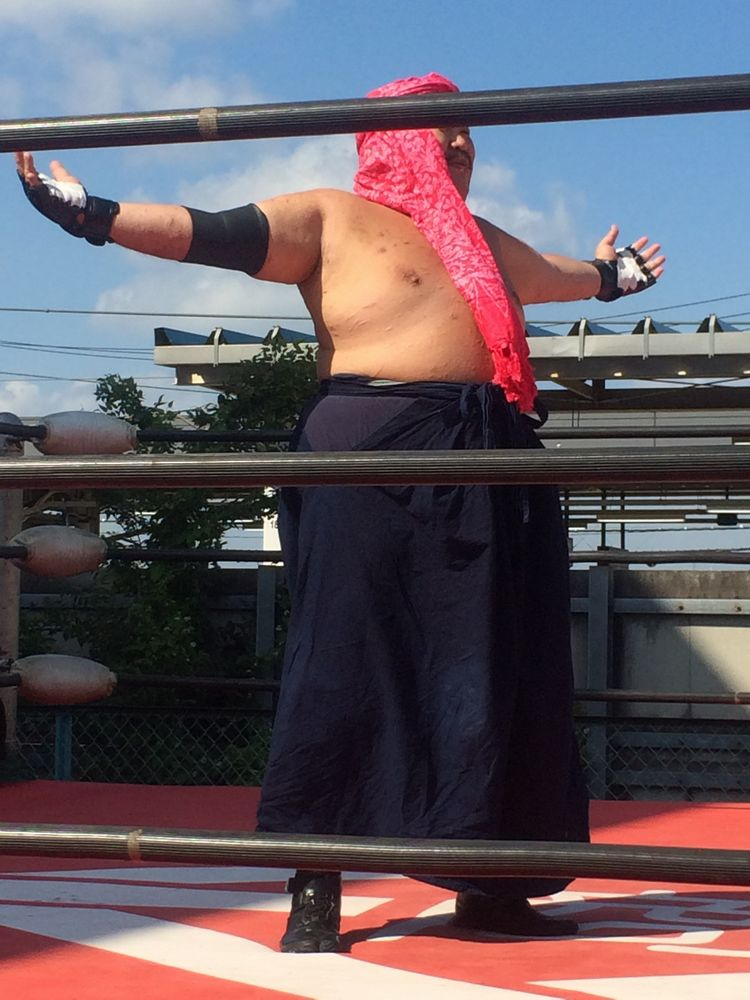
- Kobayashi in 2015

Personal information
- Born: Yōsuke Kobayashi; July 22, 1976 (age 50) Koshoku, Nagano

Professional wrestling career
- Ring name(s): Abdullah Kobayashi; Abdullah Jr. Kobayashi; Abu Mokkori; Gannosuke "GK" Kobayashi; Mr. Gennosuke; Stan Kobayashi; Yōsuke Kobayashi
- Billed height: 1.75 m (5 ft 9 in)
- Billed weight: 165 kg (364 lb)
- Trained by: Abdullah the Butcher; Kendo Nagasaki; Mr. Pogo
- Debut: May 29, 1995

Yōsuke Kobayashi (小林 洋輔, Kobayashi Yōsuke; born July 22, 1976), is a Japanese professional wrestler best known by his ring name Abdullah Kobayashi (アブドーラ・小林, Abudōra Kobayashi) after Abdullah the Butcher, who was one of his trainers.

== Professional wrestling career ==
=== Big Japan Pro Wrestling (1995–present) ===
He began his career in 1995 as one of the main wrestlers in Big Japan Pro Wrestling (BJW) in the Deathmatch division and has wrestled for BJW throughout most of his career. He is well known for his very brutal deathmatches with the likes of Ryuji Ito and several other BJW wrestlers. On June 26, 2010, Kobayashi made his American debut in Combat Zone Wrestling's Tournament of Death IX defeating Nick Gage in the first round but lost in the second to JC Bailey. In mid-2013, Kobayashi was diagnosed with hepatitis C, forcing him to take a long-term break from in-ring action to undergo treatment. He returned to the ring on August 10, 2014.

== Other media ==
Kobayashi appears as himself alongside Ryuji Ito, Daisuke Sekimoto, Takashi Sasaki and Jaki Numazawa in the 2006 film Dirty Sanchez: The Movie. Kobayashi and the other wrestlers performed wrestling moves on the three main cast members, and also made a cameo appearance in the 2004 film Otōsan no Backdrop.

== Championships and accomplishments ==
- Big Japan Pro Wrestling
  - BJW Deathmatch Heavyweight Championship (7 times, current)
  - BJW Tag Team Championship (5 times) – with Kamikaze (1), Daikokubō Benkei (1), Jaki Numazawa (1), Daisuke Sekimoto (1) and Ryuji Ito (1)
  - WEW Hardcore Tag Team Championship (1 time) – with Daikokubō Benkei
  - Sakatako Intercontinental Tag Team Championship (1 time) – with Takayuki Ueki
  - Yokohama Shopping Street 6-Man Tag Team Championship (11 times) – with Jaki Numazawa and Kazuki Hashimoto (1), Masaya Takahashi and Takayuki Ueki (1), Jaki Numazawa and Ryuji Ito (1), Jaki Numazawa and Yuko Miyamoto (1), Hideki Suzuki and Yoshihisa Uto (2), Drew Parker and Yoshihisa Uto (2), Daiju Wakamatsu and Kankuro Hoshino (1), and Kankuro Hoshino and Ryuji Ito (2)
  - Dainichi-X (2011) – with Yuji Okabayashi
  - Ikkitousen Deathmatch Survivor (2015)
  - Saikyo Tag League (2003, 2022) – with Daikokubo Benkei and Daiju Wakamatsu
  - Super Hot One Day Tournament (2024) – with Takuya Nomura
- Japan Indy Grand Prix
  - MVP Award (2012)
- Niigata Pro Wrestling
  - Niigata Openweight Championship (1 time)
- PpW Ewenement Wrestling
  - PpW European Ultraviolent Championship (1 time, current)
- Pro Wrestling Illustrated
  - Ranked No. 449 of the top 500 singles wrestlers in the PWI 500 in 2026
- Tokyo Sports
  - Fighting Spirit Award (2012)
