= Ryuji Ito =

Japanese professional wrestler (born 1976)

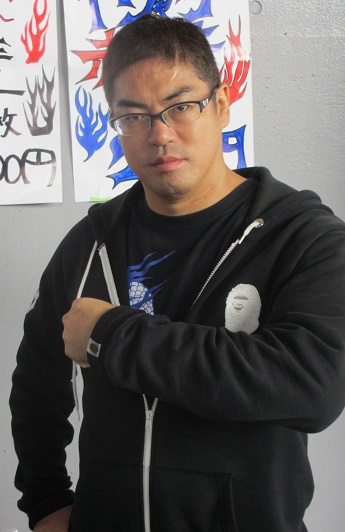
- Ito in November 2015

Personal information
- Born: April 8, 1976 (age 50) Takizawa, Iwate, Japan
- Spouse: Lee Nikkan (m. 2000)

Professional wrestling career
- Ring name(s): Dragon Show; Ryuji Ito; Ruko-Chan
- Billed height: 1.85 m (6 ft 1 in)
- Billed weight: 95 kg (209 lb)
- Trained by: BJW Dojo
- Debut: April 29, 1999

Ryuji Ito (伊東 竜二, Itō Ryūji) (born April 8, 1976) is a Japanese professional wrestler currently competing in Big Japan Pro Wrestling in the Deathmatch division.

== Career ==
=== Big Japan Pro Wrestling (1999–present) ===
Ito, whose gimmick is reminiscent of the Mortal Kombat icon Liu Kang, has been known for competing in many deathmatches over the span of his career, including a Cage match variation which saw him defeat Kintaro Kanemura. Ito participated in a "Lightube Lightsaber match" in which he fought and defeated Abdullah Kobayashi.

In 2008, Ito competed at IWA East Coast's Masters of Pain, where he lost to Thumbtack Jack in the finals after defeating Drake Younger and Danny Havoc. He also wrestled in Chikara at The Global Gauntlet the same year.

Ito has accumulated several championships over his career while working for both Big Japan Pro Wrestling and Dramatic Dream Team. He has also feuded with both Shadow WX and Men's Teioh over his titles.

== Other media ==
Ito appears as himself in the video game Backyard Wrestling 2: There Goes the Neighborhood, and also appears as himself alongside Daisuke Sekimoto, Abdullah Kobayashi, Takashi Sasaki and Jaki Numazawa in the 2006 movie Dirty Sanchez: The Movie. Ito and the other wrestlers perform wrestling moves on the three main cast members.

== Personal life ==
Ito has been married to female referee Lee Nikkan since 2000.

== Championships and accomplishments ==
- Big Japan Pro Wrestling
  - BJW Deathmatch Heavyweight Championship (7 times)
  - BJW Tag Team Championship (3 times) – with Badboy Hido (1), Abdullah Kobayashi (1) and Kankuro Hoshino (1)
  - WEW Hardcore Tag Team Championship (1 time) – with Daisaku Shimoda
  - Yokohama Shopping Street 6-Man Tag Team Championship (7 times) – with Kankuro Hoshino and Shinya Ishikawa (1), Daisuke Sekimoto and Jaki Numazawa (1), Abdullah Kobayashi and Jaki Numazawa (1), Jake Numazawa and Yuko Miyamoto (1), Takashi Sasaki and Yuko Miyamoto (1), and Abdullah Kobayashi and Kankuro Hoshino (2)
  - Hayabusa Cup (2002)
  - Ikkitousen Deathmatch Survivor (2013)
  - Triangle of Ultraviolence: Messengers of Death (2011)
  - Dainichi-X (2012) – with Takumi Tsukamoto
- Dramatic Dream Team
  - KO-D Tag Team Championship (1 time) – with Sanshiro Takagi
- Japan Indie Awards
  - Best Bout Award (2009) vs. Jun Kasai on November 20
  - Best Bout Award (2016) vs. Kankuro Hoshino on July 24
- Tokyo Sports
  - Match of the Year Award (2009) vs. Jun Kasai on November 20
