= Shadow WX =

Japanese professional wrestler

Satoru Shiga
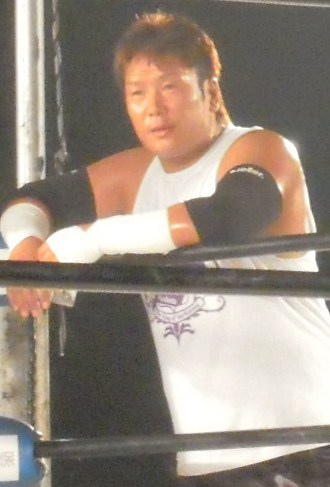

Personal information
- Born: June 11, 1969 (age 57)

Professional wrestling career
- Ring name(s): Shadow WX; Satoru; Satoru Shiga; Mr. Pogo (III)
- Billed height: 1.80 m (5 ft 11 in)
- Billed weight: 115 kg (254 lb)
- Debut: November 12, 1995

Satoru Shiga (志賀 悟, Shiga Satoru) is a professional wrestler best known for his time in Big Japan Pro Wrestling under the ring name Shadow WX. He debuted in 1995 in IWA Japan and moved to Big Japan in 1996, where he became a protege of Mr. Pogo and won the BJW Deathmatch Heavyweight Championship four times. His last match for BJW came on October 3, 2013, losing a Fluorescent Boards, Lemon and Salt Death Match to his longtime rival, The W*inger (formerly Shadow Winger).

On November 9, 2019, Shiga announced he was coming out of retirement and forming a new promotion operating out of Tokyo, Japan. Major Leaguers Wrestling (MLW) held their first events on December 13 & 15. In his return match, he defeated Necro Butcher. In August 2021, following the pandemic, he adopted the name Mr. Pogo III, after the late original, Tetsuo Sekigawa.

== Championships and accomplishments ==
- Big Japan Pro Wrestling
  - BJW Deathmatch Heavyweight Championship (4 times)
  - BJW World Tag Team Championship (3 times)
  - Falcon Cup (1998)
- DDT Pro-Wrestling
  - Ironman Heavymetalweight Championship (17 times)
