= Jaki Numazawa =

Japanese professional wrestler (born 1977)

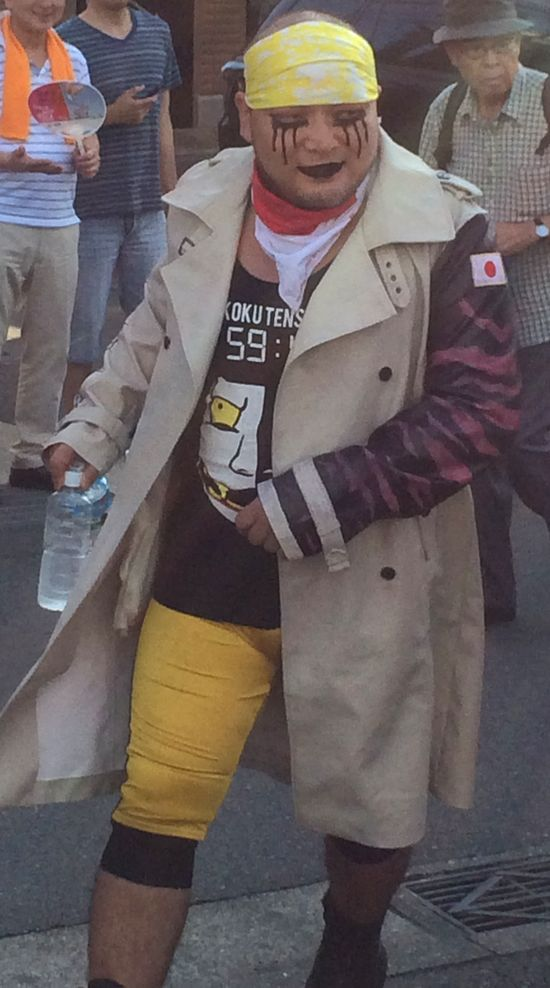
- Numazawa in August 2015

Personal information
- Born: June 7, 1977 (age 49) Honjō, Saitama, Japan

Professional wrestling career
- Ring name(s): Jaki Numasawa; Naoki Fukui; Naoki Numazawa; Shining Tiger
- Billed height: 1.74 m (5 ft 9 in)
- Billed weight: 100 kg (220 lb)
- Debut: November 27, 2000

Naoki Fukui (福井 直樹, Fukui Naoki; born Naoki Numazawa (沼澤 直樹, Numazawa Naoki) on June 7, 1977) is a Japanese professional wrestler best known by his stage name "Black Angel" Jaki Numazawa ("黒天使"沼澤邪鬼, "Kokutenshi" Numazawa Jaki). He currently wrestles for Big Japan Pro Wrestling in the Deathmatch division, where he has held the BJW Deathmatch Heavyweight Championship on one occasion.

== Personal life ==
Numazawa got married on July 4, 2014, upon which he adopted his wife's surname, Fukui.

== Other media ==
Numazawa appears as himself alongside Ryuji Ito, Abdullah Kobayashi, Takashi Sasaki and Daisuke Sekimoto in the 2006 movie Dirty Sanchez: The Movie. Numazawa and the other wrestlers perform wrestling moves on the three main cast members. Numazawa also appeared in the film Meatball Machine Koduku.

== Championships and accomplishments ==
- Apache Army

- WEW World Tag Team Championship (1 time) – with Jun Kasai

- Big Japan Pro Wrestling

- BJW Deathmatch Heavyweight Championship (1 time)
- BJW Tag Team Championship (4 times) – with Abdullah Kobayashi (1) and Jun Kasai (3)
- Yokohama Shopping Street 6-Man Tag Team Championship (5 times) – with Abdullah Kobayashi and Kazuki Hashimoto (1), and Daisuke Sekimoto and Ryuji Ito (2), Abdullah Kobayashi and Ryuji Ito (1), Abdullah Kobayashi and Yuko Miyamoto (1) and Ryuji Ito and Yuko Miyamoto (1)
- One Night Six Man Tag Tournament (2004) – with Harashima and Super-X

- DDT Pro-Wrestling

- Ironman Heavymetalweight Championship (1 time)
- Shin-Kiba Meibutsu Golden Love Lotion Championship (1 time)

- Doutonbori Pro Wrestling

- WDW Tag Team Championship (1 time) – with Masashi Takeda
