= Yusaku Ito =

Japanese professional wrestler

Personal information
- Born: 3 February 1992 (age 34) Handa, Japan

Professional wrestling career
- Ring name: Yusaku Ito
- Billed height: 170 cm (5 ft 7 in)
- Billed weight: 80 kg (176 lb)
- Trained by: Xevious
- Debut: 2011

Yusaku Ito (伊東優作, Itō Yūsaku) is a Japanese professional wrestler signed to Dove Pro Wrestling, best known for his tenure with Big Japan Pro Wrestling (BJW) and Pro Wrestling Freedoms. He also makes appearances in various promotions from the Japanese independent scene.

== Professional wrestling career ==
=== Japanese independent circuit (2011–present) ===
Ito made his professional wrestling debut at a house show promoted by Daiwa Entertainment Pro Wrestling on September 18, 2011, where he fell short to Michio Kageyama in singles competition. He worked for various hardcore wrestling promotions of the Japanese independent circuit such as Deathmatch Innovative Element (DIE), Pro Wrestling Freedoms, Pro Wrestling Heat Up, Daiwa Entertainment Pro Wrestling (DEP) and others.

At GCW/JCW Vs. The World 2024, an event promoted by Game Changer Wrestling on April 4, 2024, Ito competed in a fourteen-man tag team match in which he teamed up with Ho Ho Lun, LJ Cleary, Lou Nixon, Mizuki Watase, Ricky Knight Jr. and Shota in a losing effort against Calvin Tankman, Charlie Tiger, Marcus Mathers, Mike Bailey, Mr. Danger, Terry Yaki and Tony Deppen.

=== Pro Wrestling Freedoms (2012–present) ===
Ito made his debut in Pro Wrestling Freedoms at FREEDOMS Toru Sugiura Hometown Comeback 2012 on October 21, where he teamed up with Kengo Takai in a losing effort against Bear Fukuda and Keizo Matsuda. During his time with the promotion, he chased for various titles. He won the King of Freedom World Tag Team Championship by teaming up with Masashi Takeda at Freedoms The Gekokujo 2025 on March 19, where they defeated Kenji Fukimoto and Violento Jack. At Jun Kasai Produce Tokyo Death Match Carnival 2025 Vol. 1 on July 10, Ito unsuccessfully challenged Toru Sugiura for the King of Freedom World Championship.

=== Big Japan Pro Wrestling (2021–present) ===
Ito made his debut in Big Japan Pro Wrestling at BJW Death Market 61 on May 30, 2021, where he teamed up with Makoto Hasuka to defeat Akira Hyodo and Kosuke Sato. During his tenure with the promotion, he chased for various accomplishments. At BJW Death Mania X 2022 on August 28, he teamed up with Michio Kageyama and unsuccessfully challenged Astronauts (Fuminori Abe and Takuya Nomura) for the BJW Tag Team Championship. At BJW Death Mania XI 2023 on September 10, Ito unsuccessfully challenged Yuki Ishikawa for the BJW Deathmatch Heavyweight Championship. He eventually succeeded in winning the title at BJW Death Mania XIII 2025 on August 24, by defeating Akira.

Ito competed in various of the promotion's signature events. In the Saikyo Tag League, he made his first appaearance at the 2022 edition where he teamed up with Michio Kageyama, placing themselves in the B block of the competition and scoring a total of eight points after going against the teams of Masashi Takeda and Takumi Tsukamoto, Abdullah Kobayashi and Daiju Wakamatsu, Shigehiro Irie and Yuya Aoki, Daichi Hashimoto and Hideyoshi Kamitani, Chicharito Shoki and Yuji Okabayashi, Kazuki Hashimoto and Satsuki Nagao, Kankuro Hoshino and Yuichi Taniguchi, and Brahman Kei and Brahman Shu.

== Championships and accomplishments ==
- Big Japan Pro Wrestling
  - BJW Deathmatch Heavyweight Championship (1 time)
- Daiwa Entertainment Pro Wrestling
  - DEP Openweight Championship (1 time)
  - DEP Tag Team Championship (1 time) – with Tamura
- Dove Pro Wrestling
  - Dove Pro Tag Team Championship (1 time) – with Akira Jo
- Pro Wrestling Freedoms
  - King of Freedom World Tag Team Championship (1 time) – with Masashi Takeda
  - Barefoot King Championship (1 time)
- Pro Wrestling Heat Up
  - Heat Up Universal Tag Team Championship (1 time) – with Gunso
