= Gentaro (wrestler) =

Japanese professional wrestler (born 1974)

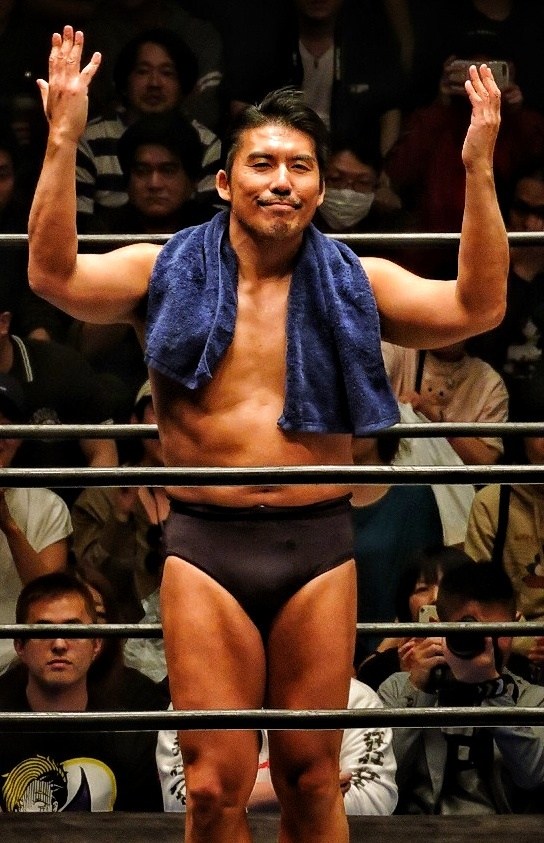
- Gentaro in May 2019

Personal information
- Born: Gentaro Takahashi; October 28, 1974 (age 51) Koganei, Tokyo

Professional wrestling career
- Ring name(s): Anavel Taro; Benten; Blue Onigumo; Bret Gentaro; Gentaro; GGG / Great God Gentaro / Triple G Kojiki; Madness Tiger; Masked Taro; Moto Tairou; Nasty Black Panther; Snuka Boy; Takahashi
- Billed height: 1.76 m (5 ft 9 1/2 in)
- Billed weight: 90 kg (198 lb)
- Debut: May 8, 1999

Gentaro Takahashi (高橋 元太郎, Takahashi Gentarō; born October 28, 1974) is a Japanese professional wrestler, better known by the ring name Gentaro (stylized as GENTARO). Though officially affiliated with the Pro Wrestling Freedoms promotion, Gentaro also works for several other independent promotions, including DDT Pro-Wrestling, Kaientai Dojo and women's wrestling promotion Ice Ribbon, where he works mainly as the lead play-by-play announcer. Takahashi also makes sporadic appearances as the masked character Benten (also stylized in all capital letters).

== Professional wrestling career ==
Trained by the Wrestle Dream Factory (WDF) promotion, Takahashi made his professional wrestling debut on May 8, 1999, at a WDF event in Tokorozawa, Saitama. While also making appearances for Kageki Pro as the masked character Nasty Black Panther, Takahashi remained with WDF for two years, before becoming a freelancer in 2001.

=== Dramatic Dream Team / DDT Pro-Wrestling (2000–2012, 2014) ===
On November 30, 2000, Gentaro made his debut for Dramatic Dream Team (DDT), teaming with Takashi Sasaki in a tag team match, where they defeated Kengo Takai and Yuki Nishino. Gentaro began working regularly for the promotion in October 2001, when he started a storyline rivalry with Mikami. On November 1, Gentaro won his first title in DDT, when he and Yoshiya defeated Mikami and Thanomsak Toba to win the vacant KO-D Tag Team Championship. Gentaro and Yoshiya made their first successful defense on November 30, defeating Mikami and Toba in a rematch, with Gentaro pinning his rival for the win. However, on December 12, Mikami came back and pinned Gentaro to make himself and Gentaro's former partner Takashi Sasaki the new KO-D Tag Team Champions. On June 6, 2002, Gentaro received his first shot at DDT's top singles title, the KO-D Openweight Championship, when he unsuccessfully challenged Kintaro Kanemura. In July, Gentaro reunited with Takashi Sasaki, under the team name Akarangers, to take part in the 2002 KO-D Tag League, where they would finish third. On October 24, the Akarangers defeated Mikami and Thanomsak Toba in a Championship vs. Championship match to retain the WEW World Tag Team Championship and win the KO-D Tag Team Championship. On November 14, Gentaro defeated Sasaki and Tomohiko Hashimoto in a three-way match to become the number one contender to the KO-D Openweight Championship. On November 29, Gentaro defeated Sanshiro Takagi to also become the new KO-D Openweight Champion. However, his reign would last less than a month, as he was defeated by his rival Mikami on December 22, in a four-way match, which also included Sanshiro Takagi and Tomohiko Hashimoto. On January 4, 2003, Gentaro made his first appearance as the kabuki mask wearing Benten, taking part in a battle royal for the Ironman Heavymetalweight Championship. Benten has since also made appearances for Kaientai Dojo, Apache Pro-Wrestling Army, New Japan Pro-Wrestling, and Union Pro Wrestling. On January 31, 2003, Gentaro and Sasaki lost the KO-D Tag Team Championship to Sanshiro Takagi and Tomohiko Hashimoto. Shortly afterwards, Gentaro left DDT for the remainder of the year, returning in early 2004, when he reunited with Sasaki, with the two defeating Hero! and Kudo on February 11 to regain the KO-D Tag Team Championship. After three successful defenses, they lost the title to Ryuji Ito and Sanshiro Takagi on July 1. On September 30, Gentaro won the Ironman Heavymetalweight Championship two times during a ten-minute battle royal, but was unable to leave the match with the title. From October 2004 to December 2009, Gentaro only made fifteen appearances for DDT, but still managed to win the Ironman Heavymetalweight Championship for the third time on April 9, 2008, and losing it two days later.

Gentaro finally returned full-time on January 10, 2010, when he defeated longtime rival Mikami for the DDT Extreme Championship. After a four-month reign, he lost the title to Danshoku Dino on May 5. In October 2010, Gentaro formed a new stable named Granma with Dick Togo and Yasu Urano. After Gentaro and Urano unsuccessfully challenged Antonio Honda and Daisuke Sasaki for the KO-D Tag Team Championship on November 28, Gentaro also faced Honda in a losing effort for the interim KO-D Openweight Championship on December 26. On February 20, 2011, Gentaro and Urano defeated Honda and Sasaki in a rematch to win the KO-D Tag Team Championship, Gentaro's third time winning the title. On March 27, Gentaro entered the annual Anytime and Anywhere battle royal, a match combining elements of a regular battle royal and a ladder match, where he managed to grab the "Right to Challenge Anytime, Anywhere" contract to earn the right to challenge for the KO-D Openweight Championship at a time of his own choosing. After three successful title defenses, Gentaro and Urano lost the KO-D Tag Team Championship to Munenori Sawa and Shigehiro Irie on June 4. On June 19, Gentaro cashed in his "Right to Challenge Anytime, Anywhere" contract, but was defeated in his KO-D Openweight Championship match by the defending champion, Shuji Ishikawa. Granma folded shortly afterwards, following the retirement of Dick Togo on June 30, and Gentaro and Urano failing to recapture the KO-D Tag Team Championship on July 24. Gentaro returned to DDT on June 3, 2012, when Tomomitsu Matsunaga chose him as his tag team partner, after earning the right to challenge for the KO-D Tag Team Championship. In their title match, Gentaro and Matsunaga were defeated by the defending champions, Yasu Urano and Yuji Hino. On July 30, Gentaro returned to referee a four-way tag team match, after which he surprised one of the competitors, Mio Shirai, and pinned her to become the new Ironman Heavymetalweight Champion. However, his reign ended later that same event, when he was pinned by Michael Mamezawa.

Gentaro returned to DDT on July 20, 2014, when he teamed with Yasu Urano in a tag team match, where they faced Mikami and Tomomitsu Matsunaga. After submitting Mikami for the win, Gentaro entered a storyline, where he took his "unmotivated" opponent under his wing to help him out of his recent slump. This led to a match on August 17 at DDT's biggest event of the year, Ryōgoku Peter Pan 2014, where Gentaro and Mikami defeated Akito and Yasu Urano.

=== WEW and Apache Pro-Wrestling Army (2002–2009) ===
In 2002, Gentaro began working for the newly founded World Entertainment Wrestling (WEW), teaming with Takashi Sasaki on August 23 to defeat Hi68 and Taka Michinoku and become the first WEW-promoted World Tag Team Champions. After a seven-month reign, Gentaro and Sasaki lost the title to Kintaro Kanemura and Tetsuhiro Kuroda on March 11, 2003. The following year, WEW folded and was replaced by Apache Pro-Wrestling Army, with Gentaro jumping to the new promotion, where he would join the Apache Army. As a member of the Apache Army, Gentaro formed a regular partnership with The Winger and adopted a new character, opposing all hardcore wrestling. On September 23, 2007, Gentaro and The Winger defeated Jun Kasai and Jaki Numazawa to win the WEW World Tag Team Championship, starting Gentaro's second reign with the title. They would lose the title to Tokyo Gurentai (Mazada and Nosawa Rongai) on April 17, 2008. The following year, Apache Pro-Wrestling Army folded.

=== Kaientai Dojo (2003–present) ===
On August 16, 2003, Gentaro made his debut for Kaientai Dojo, teaming with Hi69 to defeat Kengo Mashimo and Kunio Toshima in a tag team match. During the following months, Gentaro formed a regular trio with Hi69 and Kazma. In December 2003, Gentaro, Daigoro Kashiwa, Hi69, Kazma, Psycho and Teppei Ishizaka made it to the finals of the Survivor-K tournament, before being defeated by Kengo Mashimo, Kunio Toshima, Mike Lee Jr., Miyawaki, Super-X and Yuu Yamagata. On July 3, 2004, Gentaro won his first championship in Kaientai Dojo, when he teamed with Yoshiya to defeat Daigoro Kashiwa and Teppei Ishizaka for the UWA/UWF Intercontinental Tag Team Championship. After a four-month reign, Gentaro and Yoshiya lost the title to Taka Michinoku and Ryota Chikuzen on October 30. Gentaro became a champion again on February 12, 2005, when he defeated Onryo for the UWA World Middleweight Championship. However, his reign ended just seven days later, when he was defeated by Boso Boy Raito. Afterwards, Gentaro took a four-month break from Kaientai Dojo to concentrate on his work in Apache Pro-Wrestling Army, defeating Psycho in his return match on June 11. The following month, he entered the Strongest-K tournament, defeating female wrestler Tomoka Nakagawa and Kunio Toshima to advance to the semifinals of the tournament, where, on August 6, he was defeated by Psycho. During the next four years, Gentaro only made three more appearances for Kaientai Dojo.

After the folding of Apache Pro-Wrestling Army, Gentaro returned to Kaientai Dojo on May 5, 2009, reuniting with Yoshiya. On August 9, Gentaro and Yoshiya unsuccessfully challenged Makoto Oishi and Shiori Asahi for the Strongest-K Tag Team Championship. On September 23, Gentaro defeated Oishi to win the Independent World Junior Heavyweight Championship. Afterwards, Gentaro began spending more time in his new home promotion, Pro Wrestling Freedoms, but returned on April 2, 2010, to lose the Independent World Junior Heavyweight Championship to Marines Mask II. Gentaro's next Kaientai Dojo appearance took place on December 16, 2011, when he wrestled in Kengo Mashimo's tenth anniversary match, where Mashimo, Hiroki and Yasu Urano defeated Gentaro, Taka Michinoku and Yoshiya. On January 9, 2012, Gentaro and Hiroki entered the Kaientai Dojo Tag League, where they made it to the finals, before losing to Kengo Mashimo and Taka Michinoku on January 28. On February 4, Gentaro and Hiroki defeated Mashimo and Ryuichi Sekine in a tag team match, with Gentaro pinning Mashimo for the win. As a result, Gentaro was named the number one contender to Mashimo's Strongest-K Championship, but was defeated in the title match on February 26.

Gentaro returned to Kaientai Dojo on July 17, 2014, unsuccessfully challenging Taka Michinoku for the Independent World Junior Heavyweight Championship.

=== Ice Ribbon (2008–present) ===
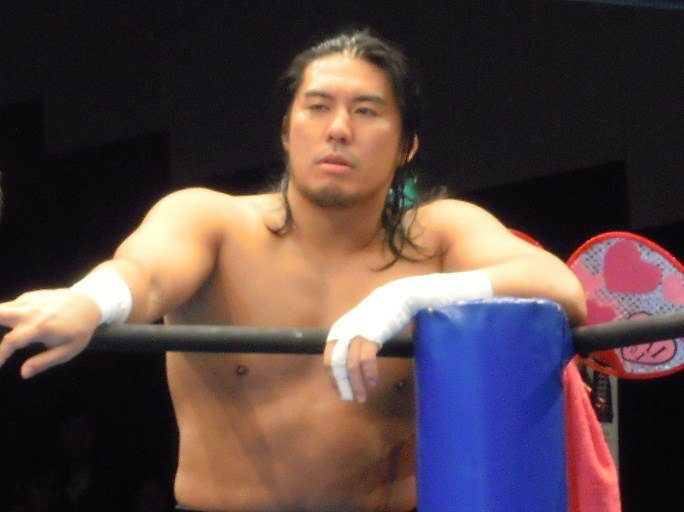
Gentaro in September 2010

On July 14, 2008, Gentaro made his debut for women's wrestling promotion Ice Ribbon, teaming with Riho to defeat Emi Sakura and Ribbon Takanashi in a tag team match. Gentaro returned to Ice Ribbon seventeen months later on December 20, 2009, when he began working regularly for the promotion, becoming only the second male wrestler to have a regular spot on the roster (the first being Ribbon Takanashi). In March 2010, Gentaro got involved in a storyline with Miyako Matsumoto, starting on March 31, when he successfully defended the DDT Extreme Championship against her. Following the match, Gentaro and Matsumoto formed a tag team, wrestling Keita Yano and Munenori Sawa to a fifteen-minute time limit draw on April 7. However, problems quickly arose between the two, when Matsumoto revealed that Gentaro's fellow Freedoms worker Jun Kasai was her favorite wrestler. On April 17, when Matsumoto and Kasai were named the number one contenders to the International Ribbon Tag Team Championship, held by Kazumi Shimouna and Nanae Takahashi of Passion Red, Gentaro interrupted the announcement and demanded to be included in the match. When Emi Sakura agreed to change the match, Keita Yano entered the ring and attacked Matsumoto, revealing himself as Gentaro's partner. The three-way match, contested under hardcore rules, took place on May 3, and saw Matsumoto and Kasai become the new champions. On August 11, Gentaro formed a new tag team with Mai Ichii, with the two defeating the reigning International Ribbon Tag Team Champions, Chii Tomiya and Isami Kodaka, in a non-title match in their first match together. As a result, Gentaro and Ichii were granted a shot at the title on September 23, where they defeated Tomiya and Kodaka to become the new International Ribbon Tag Team Champions. However, Gentaro's and Ichii's reign ended just two days later, when they were defeated by Emi Sakura and Nanae Takahashi. Since losing the International Ribbon Tag Team Championship, Gentaro has mainly remained outside of storylines, wrestling only sporadically, and instead began working as the lead play-by-play announcer on Ice Ribbon's broadcasts on Ustream and Samurai TV.

=== Freedoms (2009–present) ===
After the folding of Apache Pro-Wrestling Army, Gentaro officially made Pro Wrestling Freedoms his new home promotion, debuting at the promotion's first ever event on September 2, defeating the promotion's founder and former partner Takashi Sasaki in the opening match. Later in the main event, Gentaro teamed with The Winger in a losing effort against the team of Taka Michinoku and Tajiri. At the promotion's second event on September 27, Gentaro defeated El Samurai in the main event to retain the International Junior Heavyweight and VKF Championships. During the rest of the year, Gentaro also successfully defended the titles against Madoka and just the International Junior Heavyweight Championship against Kazuhiko Ogasawara. In November, Gentaro was invited to represent Freedoms in New Japan Pro-Wrestling's 2009 Super J-Cup. He was eliminated from the tournament in the first round on December 22 by Ryusuke Taguchi. In early 2010, Gentaro continued defending both titles, while also regularly teaming with The Winger, with the two joining the Freedoms Army in the process. Freedoms Army feuded with the Big Japan Pro Wrestling based Kojika Army, culminating on June 21, 2010, in a special event, where members of both stables faced each other in singles matches. In the main event of the evening, Gentaro defeated Kojika Army leader, The Great Kojika, in a singles match, winning the match series for Freedoms Army 3–2. At the following event on July 15, Gentaro turned on the Freedoms Army and jumped to the Kojika Army. The turn built to a four-on-four elimination match between the two stables on November 23, which Takashi Sasaki won for Freedoms by pinning Gentaro. On December 15, Gentaro was defeated by Sasaki in a Two Out of Three Falls main event, ending the rivalry between the two wrestlers. In 2011, the Kojika Army moved on to feuding with the DDT Pro-Wrestling based TKG48 stable, led by Sanshiro Takagi. On March 6, Gentaro teamed with The Great Kojika to defeat Takagi and Riki Sensyu in a tag team match, pinning Takagi for the win. On March 26, Gentaro unsuccessfully challenged Jun Kasai for American promotion Combat Zone Wrestling's (CZW) Ultraviolent Underground Championship in a "Pool of Blood Deathmatch". On May 8, Gentaro returned to defending the VKF Championship, when he defeated TKG48 member Shigehiro Irie in the main event to retain the title. The following September, Gentaro left the Kojika Army and on October 27, 2011, defeated The Great Kojika in a singles match. On August 5, 2012, after a match at a Freedoms event, Gentaro was hospitalized and diagnosed with cerebral infarction. Gentaro resumed training in May 2013 and in early 2014 announced he was ready to return to the ring. On May 2, 2014, Gentaro was defeated by Isami Kodaka in his first match in 21 months. On March 5, Gentaro won his Freedoms title, when he and Kenichiro Arai defeated El Hijo del Winger Uno and El Hijo del Winger Dos for the King of Freedom World Tag Team Championship. They lost the title to Buffalo and Yuya Susumu in their first defense on March 23. On May 1, Gentaro unsuccessfully challenged Masashi Takeda for the King of Freedom World Championship. On July 25, Gentaro and Takashi Sasaki defeated Kamui and Mammoth Sasaki to win the King of Freedom World Tag Team Championship. They lost the title to Kenji Fukimoto and Minoru Fujita four days later.

On August 11, 2016, Gentaro defeated The Winger to win the UWA World Junior Heavyweight Championship. After losing the title to Miedo Extremo on November 17, he regained it on December 7. He then lost the title to Yuya Susumu in his third defense on May 2, 2017.

== Championships and accomplishments ==
- Big Japan Pro Wrestling
  - BJW Tag Team Championship (1 time) – with Takashi Sasaki
- Daiwa Entertainment Pro-Wrestling
  - DEP Tag Team Championship (1 time) – with Kenta Kosugi
- Dramatic Dream Team/DDT Pro-Wrestling
  - DDT Extreme Championship (1 time)
  - Ironman Heavymetalweight Championship (5 times)
  - KO-D 10-Man Tag Team Championship (1 time) – with Poison Sawada Julie, Takashi Sasaki, Mikami and Thanomsak Toba
  - KO-D Openweight Championship (1 time)
  - KO-D Tag Team Championship (4 times) – with Yoshiya (1), Takashi Sasaki (2), and Yasu Urano (1)
  - Right to Challenge Anytime, Anywhere Contract (2011)
- Ice Ribbon
  - International Ribbon Tag Team Championship (1 time) – with Mai Ichii
- Kageki Pro
  - Kageki Pro Heavyweight Championship (1 time)
- Kaientai Dojo
  - Independent World Junior Heavyweight Championship (1 time)
  - UWA/UWF Intercontinental Tag Team Championship (1 time) – with Yoshiya
  - UWA World Middleweight Championship (1 time)
  - Best Tag Team Match (2009) with Yoshiya vs. Makoto Oishi and Shiori Asahi on August 9
- Pro Wrestling Freedoms
  - King of Freedom World Tag Team Championship (2 times) – with Kenichiro Arai (1) and Takashi Sasaki (1)
  - UWA World Junior Heavyweight Championship (2 times)
- VKF Wrestle Naniwa
  - VKF Championship (1 time)
- World Entertainment Wrestling/Apache Pro-Wrestling Army/Pro-Wrestling A-Team
  - WEW Junior Heavyweight Championship (1 time)
  - WEW World Tag Team Championship (3 times) – with Takashi Sasaki (1), The Winger (1) and Nobutaka Moribe (1)
- Wrestling Marvelous of the Future
  - WMF Junior Heavyweight Championship (1 time)
