= Barefoot King Championship =

Professional wrestling championship

Details
- Promotion: Pro Wrestling Freedoms
- Date established: August 11, 2023
- Current champion: Takashi Sasaki
- Date won: July 30, 2026
Statistics
- First champion: Takayuki Ueki
- Most reigns: As an individual (7 reigns): Takayuki Ueki; As a team (2 reigns): Chest Hair Brothers (Takayuki Ueki and Kentaro Hachisu)
- Longest reign: Rekka (35 days) (documented)
- Oldest champion: Takashi Sasaki (51 years, 195 days)
- Youngest champion: Yusaku Ito (31 years, 206 days)
- Heaviest champion: Yuji Hino (123 kg (271 lb))
- Lightest champion: Unagi Sayaka (54 kg (119 lb))

The Barefoot King Championship (Japanese: 裸足王王座, Hepburn: Hadashi-ō Ōza) is a title in the Japanese professional wrestling promotion Pro Wrestling Freedoms. The title was established in 2023 and is defended in hardcore matches involving various weapons in which the competitors are barefoot. The title can be held by both individual wrestlers and by tag teams. The champion is simply being referred to as the Barefoot King.

The title is currently held by Takashi Sasaki who is in his second reign.

== Title history ==
As of August 21, 2026, there have been a total of twenty-one reigns shared between seventeen individual champions, four tag teams and five vacancies.

Key
No.	Overall reign number
Reign	Reign number for the specific team—reign numbers for the individuals are in parentheses, if different
Days	Number of days held
<1	Reign lasted less than a day
+	Current reign is changing daily

No.	Champion	Championship change			Reign statistics		Notes	Ref.
No.	Champion	Date	Event	Location	Reign	Days	Notes	Ref.
1	Takayuki Ueki	August 11, 2023	Yokohama Mōshin 2023: Jiyūjin-tachi no Kyōen	Yokohama, Japan	1	17	Defeated Minoru Fujita in a Barefoot Toy Block Deathmatch to become the inaugural champion.	
2	Yusaku Ito	August 28, 2023	Tokyo Deathmatch Carnival 2023 vol. 2	Tokyo, Japan	1	<1	This was a Barefoot R-Designation Hentai Cat Deathmatch.	
—	Vacated	August 28, 2023	Tokyo Deathmatch Carnival 2023 vol. 2	Tokyo, Japan	—	—	Ito vacated the title immediately after winning it.	
3	Masashi Takeda	February 8, 2024	Go Beyond the Limit 2024	Tokyo, Japan	1	<1	Defeated Takayuki Ueki in a Barefoot Fluorescent Light Tubes & Thumbtacks + α Deathmatch in which Takeda's King of Freedom World Championship was also on the line to win the vacant title.	
—	Vacated	February 8, 2024	Go Beyond the Limit 2024	Tokyo, Japan	—	—	Takeda vacated the title immediately after winning it.	
4	Toru Sugiura	July 11, 2024	Tokyo Death Match Carnival 2024 vol. 1	Tokyo, Japan	1	<1	Defeated Takayuki Ueki in a Barefoot Healthy Foot Reflexology Deathmatch in which Sugiura's King of Sugiuraman World Junior Heavyweight Championship was also on the line to win the vacant title.	
—	Vacated	July 11, 2024	Tokyo Death Match Carnival 2024 vol. 1	Tokyo, Japan	—	—	Sugiura vacated the title immediately after winning it.	
5	Brahman Brothers (Brahman Shu and Brahman Kei)	August 29, 2024	Tokyo Death Match Carnival 2024 vol. 2	Tokyo, Japan	1 (1, 1)	17	Defeated Takayuki Ueki, Minoru Fujita, and Rina Yamashita in a Barefoot Five-Way Freestyle Deathmatch to win the vacant title. With this victory, the Brahman Brothers became the first tag team to hold the championship. The title briefly became the Barefoot King Tag Team Championship.	
6	Chest Hair Brothers (Takayuki Ueki and Kentaro Hachisu)	September 15, 2024	Freedoms 15th Anniversary ~ Feast Of The Free People	Tokyo, Japan	1 (2, 1)	25		
7	ERE (Toshiyuki Sakuda and Kyu Mogami)	October 10, 2024	Freedoms Tono No Yabo 2024	Tokyo, Japan	1 (1, 1)	<1	This was a Barefoot Chest Hair Sea Bloody Sea Hell Deathmatch.	
—	Vacated	October 10, 2024	Freedoms Tono No Yabo 2024	Tokyo, Japan	—	—	Sakuda and Mogami vacated the title immediately after winning it.	
8	Takayuki Ueki	December 12, 2024	Freedoms Road To Blood X'Mas 2024	Tokyo, Japan	3	22	Defeated Jun Kasai to win the vacant title. The title subsequently reverted to the Barefoot King Championship.	
9	Rekka	January 3, 2025	Freedoms Happy New Freedom 2025	Tokyo, Japan	1	35	This was a 10-man battle royal. Rekka last eliminated Kyu Mogami to win the title.	
10	Kentaro Hachisu	February 7, 2025	Freedoms Go Beyond The Limit 2025	Tokyo, Japan	2	N/A	This was a six-way match also involving Takayuki Ueki, Brahman Shu, Brahman Kei and Kyu Mogami. The exact date that Hachisu lost the championship is uncertain.	
11	Takayuki Ueki	≤ July 10, 2025	N/A	N/A	4	N/A	The exact circumstances in which Ueki won the championship are uncertain. On July 10, 2025, at Freedoms/Jun Kasai Produce Tokyo Death Match Carnival Vol. 1, Ueki competed as the titleholder.	
12	Jun Masaoka	July 10, 2025	Freedoms/Jun Kasai Produce Tokyo Death Match Carnival 2025 Vol. 1	Tokyo, Japan	1	<1	This was a Barefoot MJ Death Match.	
—	Vacated	July 10, 2025	Freedoms/Jun Kasai Produce Tokyo Death Match Carnival 2025 Vol. 1	Tokyo, Japan	—	—	After winning the title, Masaoka dropped the belt into a trash can, which was sanctioned as a vacancy of the title.	
13	Chest Hair Brothers (Takayuki Ueki and Kentaro Hachisu)	≤ August 17, 2025	N/A	N/A	2 (5, 3)	N/A	The exact circumstances in which Ueki and Hachisu won the championship are uncertain. They were billed as champions at Freedoms Feast Of The Free People on August 17, 2025.	
14	Takashi Sasaki and Unagi Sayaka	August 17, 2025	Freedoms Feast Of The Free People 2025	Yokohama, Japan	1 (1, 1)	N/A	Sayaka became the first female to hold the titles. The exact length of the reign is uncertain, possibly lasting between 0 and 130 days.	
15	Takayuki Ueki	≤ August 17, 2025	N/A	N/A	6	N/A	The exact circumstances in which Ueki won the championship are uncertain. He was billed as champion at Jun Kasai Produce Blood X'Mas on December 25, 2025.	
16	Daisuke Masaoka	December 25, 2025	Freedoms/Jun Kasai Produce Blood X'Mas 2025	Tokyo, Japan	1	N/A	This was a Barefoot Toy Block Death Match. The exact length of the reign is uncertain, possibly lasting between 0 and 49 days.	
17	Takayuki Ueki	≤ February 12, 2026	N/A	N/A	7	N/A	The exact circumstances in which Ueki won the championship are uncertain. He was billed as champion at Freedoms Go Beyond The Limit on February 12, 2026.	
18	Kota Sekifuda	February 12, 2026	Freedoms Go Beyond The Limit	Tokyo, Japan	1	<1	This was a Barefoot Toy Block Death Match.	
—	Vacated	February 12, 2026	Freedoms Go Beyond The Limit	Tokyo, Japan	—	—	Sekifuda vacated the title immediately after winning it.	
19	Yuji Hino	May 31, 2026	Freedoms Deathmatch Festival	Kumamoto, Japan	1	<1	Defeated Takayuki Ueki in a Barefoot Toy Block Death Match to win the vacant title.	
—	Vacated	May 31, 2026	Freedoms Deathmatch Festival	Kumamoto, Japan	—	—	Hino vacated the title immediately after winning it.	
20	Mizuki Watase	July 9, 2026	Freedoms Jun Kasai Produce Tokyo Death Match Carnival 2026 Vol. 1	Tokyo, Japan	1	<1	Defeated Takayuki Ueki in a Barefoot Toy Block Deathmatch to win the vacant title.	
—	Vacated	July 9, 2026	Freedoms Jun Kasai Produce Tokyo Death Match Carnival 2026 Vol. 1	Tokyo, Japan	—	—	Watase vacated the title immediately after winning it due to also being a co-holder of the King of Freedom World Tag Team Championship.	
21	Takashi Sasaki	July 30, 2026	Freedoms Jun Kasai Produce Shinkiba Death Match Carnival 2026 Vol. 1	Tokyo, Japan	2	22+	Defeated Takayuki Ueki in a Cat Repellent Sheet Death Match to win the vacant title.	

== Combined reigns ==
As of August 21, 2026.

†	Indicates the current champion
¤	The exact length of at least one title reign is uncertain

Rank	Wrestler	No. of reigns	Combined days
1	Takayuki Ueki	6	64-395¤
2	Rekka	1	35
3	Kentaro Hachisu	2	25-226¤
4	Brahman Shu	1	17
4	Brahman Kei	1	17
6	Takashi Sasaki †	2	22-152+
7	Unagi Sayaka	1	0-130¤
8	Daisuke Masaoka	1	0-49¤
9	Jun Masaoka	1	<1
9	Kota Sekifuda	1	<1
9	Kyu Mogami	1	<1
9	Masashi Takeda	1	<1
9	Mizuki Watase	1	<1
9	Toshiyuki Sakuda	1	<1
9	Toru Sugiura	1	<1
9	Yuji Hino	1	<1
9	Yusaku Ito	1	<1

== See also ==
- Professional wrestling in Japan
