= Pro Wrestling Freedoms =

Japanese professional wrestling

- Acronym: Freedoms
- Founded: 2009
- Style: Puroresu; Deathmatch wrestling
- Headquarters: Chigasaki, Kanagawa, Japan
- Founder: Takashi Sasaki
- Predecessor: Apache Pro-Wrestling Army
- Website: Official website

Pro Wrestling Freedoms (プロレスリングFREEDOMS, Puroresuringu Furīdamuzu), also known simply as Freedoms (stylized in capital letters as FREEDOMS), is a Japanese professional wrestling promotion based in Chigasaki, Kanagawa. Founded by Takashi Sasaki in 2009, the promotion's name is derived from its founding philosophy of letting wrestlers choose their own fighting style, or affording them the "freedom" of choice.

== History ==
Following the closure of Apache Pro-Wrestling Army (Apache Pro) on August 8, 2009, Apache Pro's promoter Takashi Sasaki announced the creation of Pro Wrestling Freedoms (Freedoms) with Gentaro, Jun Kasai, Kamui, Mammoth Sasaki and The Winger.

Over the years, Freedoms has become one of Japan's premier deathmatch companies, alongside Big Japan Pro Wrestling. They formed an alliance with the American promotion Game Changer Wrestling (GCW) that has seen both companies trade stars and co-promote events together. In 2018, GCW initiated The Collective, a series of showcases from partnering independent promotions held during WrestleMania weekend. Freedoms was scheduled to hold their first-ever event in the United States in April 2020 as part of The Collective 2020. However, the event was cancelled due to the COVID-19 pandemic. In December 2020, Freedoms began a partnership with Active Advance Pro Wrestling (2AW), promoting a series of crossover shows beginning with Freedoms/2AW Versus on December 13.

The promotion airs on the IndependentWrestling.tv (IWTV) streaming service; IWTV additionally carries events from Sendai Girls' Pro Wrestling, Defy Wrestling, Combat Zone Wrestling, Absolute Intense Wrestling, amongst other promotions. The promotion holds most of their events in various venues such as Korakuen Hall and Shin-Kiba 1st Ring. Some of Freedoms' current top stars include deathmatch wrestlers Jun Kasai, Masashi Takeda, Toru Sugiura, and Daisuke Masaoka.

== Roster ==
=== Active roster ===
This is a list of professional wrestlers who currently wrestle for the company.

Ring name	Real name	Notes
Daisuke Masaoka	Unknown	
Dragon Libre	Unknown	
Gentaro	Gentaro Takahashi	
Jun Kasai	Jun Kasai	
Jun Masaoka	Unknown	Freelancer; King of Freedom World Tag Team Champion
Kamui	Kamui Sawaragi	
Kengo	Kengo Nishimura	Freelancer; King of Freedom World Junior Heavyweight Champion
Kenji Fukimoto	Unknown	
Kyu Mogami	Unknown	Signed to Active Advance Pro Wrestling
Mammoth Sasaki	Yoshinori Sasaki	
Masashi Takeda	Masashi Takeda	
Mizuki Watase	Unknown	Freelancer; King of Freedom World Tag Team Champion
Takahiro Katori	Takahiro Katori	
Takashi Sasaki	Takashi Sasaki	
Takayuki Ueki	Takayuki Ueki	Freelancer
Tatsuhito Takaiwa	Tatsuhito Takaiwa	
Tomoya Hirata	Unknown	
Toshiyuki Sakuda	Toshiyuki Sakuda	Freelancer
Toru Sugiura	Unknown	
Violento Jack	Jack A. Romero	King of Freedom World Champion
Yusaku Ito	Unknown	
Yuya Susumu	Unknown	Freelancer

=== Alumni/notable guests ===
- Black Buffalo
- Brahman Kei
- Brahman Shu
- Dai Suzuki
- Drew Parker
- Gami
- Great Kojika
- Hayata
- Hikari Shimizu
- Kagetsu
- Kaji Tomato
- Kazumi Kikuta
- Kenichiro Arai
- Kuuga
- Minoru Fujita
- Mochi Miyagi
- Rina Yamashita
- Takoyakida
- The Winger
- Yoshihisa Uto

== Championships ==
As of September 14, 2026

Championship	Current champion(s)	Reign	Date won	Days held	Location	Notes
King of Freedom World Championship	Tomoya Hirata	2	August 20, 2026	25+	Tokyo, Japan	Defeated Violento Jack at Freedom/Jun Kasai Produce Deathmatch Carnvial Vol 2.
King of Freedom World Junior Heavyweight Championship	Yuya Susumu	2	September 6, 2026	8+	Yokohama, Japan	Defeated Gaia Hox at Freedoms Jiyu Hitotaichi No Kyoen 2026.
King of Freedom World Tag Team Championship	X-Trail (Kyu Mogami and Toru Sugiura)	1 (2, 4)	August 12, 2026	33+	Tokyo, Japan	Defeated Jun Kasai and Mizuki Watase at Freedoms Jun Kasai Produce Shinkiba Death Match Carnival 2026 Vol. 2.
Barefoot King Championship	Takashi Sasaki	2	July 30, 2026	46+	Tokyo, Japan	Defeated Yuji Hino in a "Cat Repellent Sheet Death Match" to win the vacant title at Jun Kasai Produce Shinkiba Death Match Carnival 2026 Vol. 1.

== See also ==
- Professional wrestling in Japan
- List of professional wrestling promotions in Japan
