= Toru Sugiura =

Japanese professional wrestler

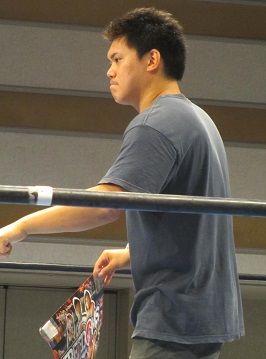
- Sugiura in September 2015

Personal information
- Born: September 30, 1990 (age 35) Handa, Japan

Professional wrestling career
- Ring name(s): Bakyun Mask; DAEMON; MIDOTEN; Sugiuraman; Toru Sugiura
- Billed height: 178 cm (5 ft 10 in)
- Billed weight: 98 kg (216 lb)
- Trained by: Mammoth Sasaki
- Debut: 2009

Toru Sugiura (杉浦 透, Sugiura Tōru) is a Japanese professional wrestler currently working for freelancer, predominantly for the Japanese promotion Pro Wrestling Freedoms. He is a former four-times King of Freedom World Champion.

== Professional wrestling career ==
=== Daiwa Entertainment Pro Wrestling (2009–present) ===
Sugiura made his professional wrestling debut in Daiwa Entertainment Pro Wrestling at DEP Special In iMall Part.1 on September 6, 2009, where he fell short to Takaya Shibayama in singles competition. He would seldomly return to continue competing for the promotion a couple of times per year. He is a former DEP Tag Team Champion, title which he has once won alongside Michio Kageyama.

=== Pro Wrestling Freedoms (2011–present) ===
The promotion in which Sugiura is best known for his work is Pro Wrestling Freedoms. He made his debut at a house show from May 8, 2011, where he teamed up with Nori da Funky Shibiresasu and Tomoya Shibayama in a losing effort against Hi69, Madoka and Ricky Fuji as a result of a six-man tag team match. During his time with the promotion, he has been part of the "Soul Meat" tag team alongside Tomoya Hirata. Sugiura chased and won various championships promoted by the company. His first title was the King of Freedom World Championship, which he won alongside Hirata at The Gekokujō 2017 on March 23 by defeating reigning champions The Brahman Brothers (Brahman Kei and Brahman Shu). Another title he has won is the King of Freedom World Championship, the promotion's top belt which he first acquired at Freedoms 10th Anniversary Celebration on October 1, 2019, by defeating Jun Kasai. His first reign is still the longest to date at 643 days.

==== Independent circuit (2009–present) ====
Sugiura also checked freelance work, competing for various promotions from the Japanese independent scene. At New Year's Eve Pro-Wrestling 2011, an independent event, Sugiura competed twice. First, he teamed up with Hiroshi Fukuda and Kotaro Nasu to defeat Daichi Sasaki, Dyna Mido and Masashi Otani, and secondly in a 74-man tag team match in which he teamed up with thirty-six partners including Kaori Yoneyama and also involving various other notable ones such as Antonio Honda, Hayata and Danshoku Dino, and they fell short against other thirty-six competitors such as Abdullah Kobayashi, Seiya Morohashi, Jaki Numazawa, Great Kojika, Harashima, Shuji Ishikawa, and many others. At Kaientai Dojo's 10th Anniversary from February 5, 2012, Sugiura teamed up with Akito and Michio Kageyama to unsuccessfully challenge Silence (Daigoro Kashiwa, Tomato Kaji and Marines Mask). On the fifth night of All Japan Pro Wrestling's AJPW Summer Explosion 2015 from August 29, he teamed up with Takashi Sasaki to defeat Naoya Nomura and Yuma Aoyagi. He took part in two of New Japan Pro Wrestling's Lion's Gate Project events. He made his first appearance at Project 4 from April 13, 2017, where he fell short to Yoshi-Hashi. At Project 5 from May 9, he teamed up with Dinosaur Takuma in a losing effort against Hiroyoshi Tenzan and Tiger Mask IV. As a deathmatch wrestler, Sugiura competed mostly in deathmatches anddid most of his external work as a Freedoms talent. He competed in one of Prominence's independent events, the Kuen Ruten ~ Hardcore Mixed Tag One Day Tournament from June 18, 2023, where he teamed up with Risa Sera and defeated Kohaku and Violento Jack in the first rounds, Mochi Miyagi and Toshiyuki Sakuda in the semifinals, but fell short to Akane Fujita and Takashi Sasaki in the finals.

==== Game Changer Wrestling (2020–present) ====
Sugiura made his debut in Game Changer Wrestling at the beginning of 2020 during his first overseas excursions. He made his first appearance at GCW Live Fast, Die Young 2020 on February 3, where he teamed up with Takashi Sasaki to defeat Kikutaro and Kyle the Beast.

He competed in one of the promotion's sugnature events, the Tournament Of Survival. Made his first appearance at the 2022 edition of the event, where he defeated Shane Mercer in the first rounds but fell short to Matt Tremont in the second ones on June 4, 2022. At the 2023 edition, he defeated Joey Janela and Tomoya Hirata in a first round three-way match, but fell short to Rina Yamashita in the semifinals. Another signature event in which he competed is the Cage Of Survival. He made his first appearance at the 2022 edition, where he teamed up with Rina Yamashita in a losing effort against Los Macizos (Ciclope and Miedo Extremo). At GCW Homecoming Weekend 2023, Sugiura successfully defended the King of Freedom World Championship against John Wayne Murdoch on the first night of the event from August 19. On the second night from August 20, Sugiuta teamed up with Takashi Sasaki and defeated The East West Express (Jordan Oliver and Nick Wayne) to win the GCW Tag Team Championship.

== Championships and accomplishments ==
- Big Japan Pro Wrestling
  - BJW Tag Team Championship (1 time, current) – with Kazumi Kikuta
- Daiwa Entertainment Pro Wrestling
  - DEP Tag Team Championship (1 time) – with Michio Kageyama
- Game Changer Wrestling
  - GCW Tag Team Championship (1 time) – with Takashi Sasaki
- Pro Wrestling Freedoms
  - King of Freedom World Championship (4 times)
  - King of Freedom World Tag Team Championship (4 times, current) – with Mammoth Sasaki (1), Tomoya Hirata (1),Daisuke Masaoka (1) and Kyu Mogami (1)
  - Barefoot King Championship (1 time)
  - King of Sugiuraman World Junior Heavyweight Championship (1 time, inaugural, current)
- Pro Wrestling Illustrated
  - Ranked No. 177 of the top 500 singles wrestlers in the PWI 500 of 2025
