= Daisuke Masaoka =

Japanese professional wrestler

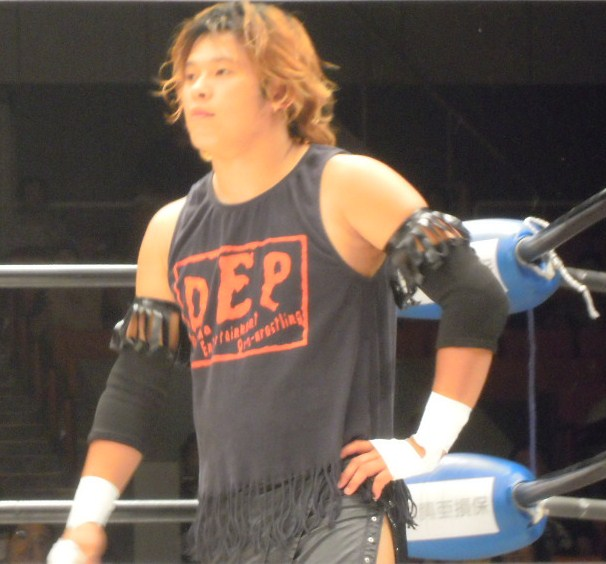

Personal information
- Born: 10 October 1983 (age 43) Imabari, Ehime, Japan

Professional wrestling career
- Ring name: Dai-chan Masaoka Daisuke Masaoka
- Billed height: 168 cm (5 ft 6 in)
- Billed weight: 70 kg (154 lb)
- Trained by: Dick Togo; Taro Toyotomi
- Debut: 2005

Daisuke Masaoka (正岡大介, Masaoka Daisuke) is a Japanese professional wrestler currently signed to Pro Wrestling Freedoms, mainly competing in the deathmatch branch. He is also known for his tenures with other promotion from the Japanese independent scene such as Big Japan Pro Wrestling and DDT Pro-Wrestling.

== Professional wrestling career ==
=== Japanese independent circuit (2004–present) ===
Masaoka made his professional wrestling debut in JWA Tokai Pro Wrestling on 10 January 2005, a promotion in which he has roughly spent one year.

At the 2012 Dragon Gate Summer Adventure Tag League of Dragongate, Masaoka made an appearance during the twelfth night of the competition from 22 August 2010, where he competed in a Survival battle royal won by Genki Horiguchi and also involving various other notable opponents such as BxB Hulk, Cima, Shingo Takagi, Kzy, Yamato and others. Masaoka competed in several other matches for Dragongate. On the second night of the Wrestle-1 Tour 2018 from 14 January, Masaoka teamed up with Koji Doi and Kumagoro to defeat Daiki Inaba, K-ness and Tsugutaka Sato. At Prominence Smoke And Flame Rising To The Sky on 28 August 2022, Masaoka defeated Suzu Suzuki in one of the latter's "Ten Death Match Series".

=== Big Japan Pro Wrestling (2009–2010; 2014) ===
Masaoka made his debut in Big Japan Pro Wrestling at BJW Death Match Wars on 3 March 2009, where he teamed up with Yuya Susumu and Atsushi Kotoge in a losing effort against Kudo, Mineo Fujita and Masa Takanashi. He roughly spent one year with the promotion, having wrestled his last match before taking a hiatus at BJW 15th Anniversary Death Touron 28 April 2010, where he teamed up with Onryo and Shiori Asahi to defeat Kazuki Hashimoto, Men's Teioh and Takumi Tsukamoto. He briefly returned to the promotion at BJW Osaka Surprise 16 on 12 July 2014, where he teamed up with Hayata, Madoka and Yo-Hey in a losing effort against Magnitude Kishiwada, Shoichi Uchida, Tadanobu Fujisawa and Yuki Tanaka in eight-man tag team competition.

=== Pro Wrestling Freedoms (2013–present) ===
Masaoka is best known for his over a decade tenure with Pro Wrestling Freedoms. During his time with the promotion, he has won the King of Freedom World Championship, the promotion's top title on two separate occasions. First at Blood X'Mas 2016 on 26 December, by defeating Violento Jack, and secondly, at The Gekokujō 2022 on 29 March, by defeating Jun Kasai. Masaoka is a four-time King of Freedom World Tag Team Champion, having won the titles kost recently at Tokyo Death Match Carnival 2023 Vol. 1 on 6 July, when he teamed up with Toru Sugiura to defeat reigning champions Mammoth Sasaki and Takashi Sasaki. Between 2017 and 2019, Masaoka was part of the "Los Nomads" stable alongside Violento Jack, Miedo Extremo, Ciclope and Mammoth Sasaki.

Masaoka often competed in cross-over events held by Freedoms in partnership with various other promotions. At FREEDOMS/2AW VersuS, an event produced alongside Active Advance Pro Wrestling on 23 October 2022, he teamed up with Soul Meat (Tomoya Hirata and Toru Sugiura) to defeat The Rule (Ayato Yoshida, Naka Shuma and Takuma Joshiba).

==== Game Changer Wrestling (2017–2023) ====
Masaoka seldomly competed in Game Changer Wrestling (GCW) as a developmental talent sent by Freedoms. He made his debut at the GCW Nick Gage Invitational 2 from 16 September 2017, in which he defeated Markus Crane in the semifinals and the fell short to Nick Gage himself in the finals. He wrestled his last match at GCW Planet Death 2023 on 19 July, where he teamed up with Yankee Two Kenju (Isami Kodaka and Yuko Miyamoto) in a losing effort against Chrli Evans, Rina Yamashita and Sawyer Wreck.

== Championships and accomplishments ==
- Daiwa Entertainment Pro Wrestling
  - DEP Tag Team Championship (1 time) – with Kenta Kosugi
- Pro Wrestling Freedoms
  - King of Freedom World Championship (2 times)
  - King of Freedom World Tag Team Championship (4 times) – with Violento Jack (2), Toru Sugiura (1) and Kamui (1)
  - Barefoot King Championship (1 time)
  - Damz Hajime Tournament (2017)
