= King of Freedom World Championship =

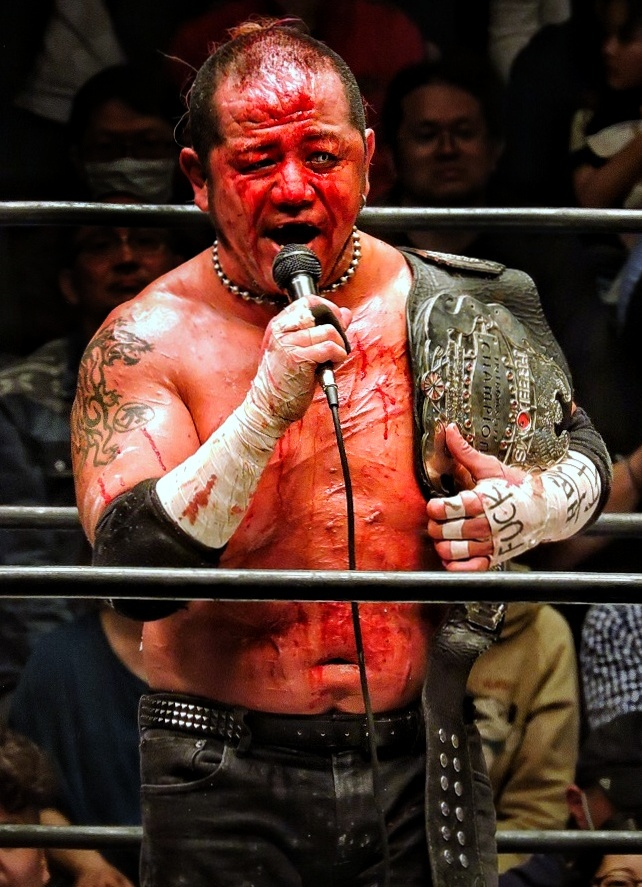
- Jun Kasai with the current title design

Details
- Promotion: Pro Wrestling Freedoms
- Date established: May 2, 2013
- Current champion: Tomoya Hirata
- Date won: August 20, 2026
Statistics
- First champion: Takashi Sasaki
- Most reigns: (5 reigns): Jun Kasai; Violento Jack
- Longest reign: Toru Sugiura (643 days)
- Shortest reign: Kazumi Kikuta (22 days)
- Oldest champion: Jun Kasai (47 years, 107 days)
- Youngest champion: Drew Parker (24 years, 243 days)
- Heaviest champion: Yuji Hino (271 lbs)
- Lightest champion: Daisuke Masaoka (154 lbs)

The King of Freedom World Championship, also referred to as the KFC Championship (Japanese: KFC王座, Hepburn: KFC Ōza), is a professional wrestling championship created and promoted by the Japanese promotion Pro Wrestling Freedoms. It is the top title of the company and is usually disputed in deathmatches.

== Title history ==
There have been a total of 25 reigns shared between ten different champions and one vacancy. The current champion is Tomoya Hirata who is in his second reign.

Key
No.	Overall reign number
Reign	Reign number for the specific champion
Days	Number of days held
Defenses	Number of successful defenses
+	Current reign is changing daily

No.	Champion	Championship change			Reign statistics			Notes	Ref.
No.	Champion	Date	Event	Location	Reign	Days	Defenses	Notes	Ref.
1	Takashi Sasaki	May 2, 2013	Freedoms	Tokyo, Japan	1	365	4	Defeated Tatsuhito Takaiwa to become the first champion.	
2	Yuji Hino	May 2, 2014	Freedoms	Tokyo, Japan	1	136	1		
3	Jun Kasai	September 15, 2014	Freedoms	Iwate, Japan	1	101	1		
4	Masashi Takeda	December 25, 2014	Freedoms/Jun Kasai Produce	Tokyo, Japan	1	365	5	This was a Glass board & alpha deathmatch.	
5	Jun Kasai	December 25, 2015	Blood X'Mas 2015	Tokyo, Japan	2	89	0	This was a Face Soka Glass Board deathmatch.	
—	Vacated	March 23, 2016	—	—	—	—	—		
6	Jun Kasai	May 2, 2016	We Love Freedoms! We Are Freedoms!	Tokyo, Japan	3	72	0	Defeated Daisuke Masaoka in a Four Corners Of Pain deathmatch to win the vacant title.	
7	Violento Jack	July 13, 2016	Crazy Monkey Presents Tokyo Death Match Carnival 2016	Tokyo, Japan	1	166	1	This was an Ultimate Kaiju Battle deathmatch.	
8	Daisuke Masaoka	December 26, 2016	Blood X'Mas 2016	Tokyo, Japan	1	322	5	This was a Scaffold, Glass Board & Alpha deathmatch.	
9	Violento Jack	November 13, 2017	Heel Don't Think 2017	Tokyo, Japan	2	170	2	This was a Glass Board & No Canvas Ring deathmatch.	
10	Masashi Takeda	May 2, 2018	We Love Freedoms! We Are Freedoms! 2018	Tokyo, Japan	2	237	2	This was a Light Tubes & Double Glass Board +α Deathmatch.	
11	Jun Kasai	December 25, 2018	Blood X'Mas 2018	Tokyo, Japan	4	280	6	This was a Surface Sleeve Glass Board & Self Board deathmatch.	
12	Toru Sugiura	October 1, 2019	Freedoms 10th Anniversary Celebration	Tokyo, Japan	1	643	9	This was a Glass Board & Fluorescent Lighttubes & Alpha deathmatch.	
13	Violento Jack	July 5, 2021	Tokyo Death Match Carnival 2021 Vol. 1	Tokyo, Japan	3	173	2	This was a Heart blood sacrifice Glass Board Fluorescent Light Tubes Alpha deathmatch.	
14	Jun Kasai	December 25, 2021	Blood X'Mas 2021	Tokyo, Japan	5	94	0	This was a Fluorescent Lighttubes Glass Board Alpha Death Match.	
15	Daisuke Masaoka	March 29, 2022	The Gekokujō 2022	Tokyo, Japan	2	153	2	This was a Hell Inside and Outside Hell Glass Board +α Death Match.	
16	Drew Parker	August 29, 2022	Tokyo Death Match Carnival 2022 Vol. 2	Tokyo, Japan	1	157	3	This was a Fluorescent Lighttubes Human Meat Slicer Board Source Death Match.	
17	Violento Jack	February 2, 2023	Go Beyond The Limit 2023	Tokyo, Japan	4	49	0	This was a No Canvas, Glass Board & Alpha Death Match.	
18	Tomoya Hirata	March 23, 2023	The Gekokujō 2023	Tokyo, Japan	1	141	3	This was a Glass Board Alpha Death Match.	
19	Toru Sugiura	August 11, 2023	Yokohama Rush 2023	Yokohama, Japan	2	136	4		
20	Masashi Takeda	December 25, 2023	Blood X'Mas 2023	Tokyo, Japan	3	265	4		
21	Toru Sugiura	September 15, 2024	FREEDOMS 15th Anniversary	Yokohama, Japan	3	85	2		
22	Kazumi Kikuta	December 9, 2024	BJW	Tokyo, Japan	1	22	0	This was a Glass Board Fluorescent Light Tubes Alpha Death Match.	
23	Toru Sugiura	December 31, 2024	BJW King Of Deathmatch World GP Tournament	Tokyo, Japan	4	240	4	This was a Glass Board Fluorescent Light Tubes Alpha Death Match.	
24	Violento Jack	August 28, 2025	FREEDOMS/Jun Kasai Produce Tokyo Death Match Carnival 2025 Vol. 2	Tokyo, Japan	5	357	6	This was a Fluorescent Lighttubes Death Tower Alpha Death Match.	
25	Tomoya Hirata	August 20, 2026	FREEDOMS/Jun Kasai Produce Tokyo Death Match Carnival 2026 Vol. 2	Tokyo, Japan	2	86+	3	This was a Glass Board And Lighttubes Death Match.	

=== Combined reigns ===
As of November 14, 2026.

†	Indicates the current champion

Rank	Wrestler	No. of reigns	Combined defenses	Combined days
1	Toru Sugiura	4	19	1,104
2	Violento Jack	5	11	915
3	Masashi Takeda	3	11	867
4	Jun Kasai	5	7	636
5	Daisuke Masaoka	2	7	475
6	Takashi Sasaki	1	4	365
7	Tomoya Hirata †	2	5	227+
8	Drew Parker	1	3	157
9	Yuji Hino	1	1	136
10	Kazumi Kikuta	1	0	22

== See also ==
- King of Freedom World Junior Heavyweight Championship
- King of Freedom World Tag Team Championship
