= King of Freedom World Junior Heavyweight Championship =

Professional wrestling championship

- The King of Freedom World Junior Heavyweight Championship belt

Details
- Promotion: Pro Wrestling Freedoms
- Date established: September 18, 2022
- Current champion: Yuya Susumu
- Date won: September 6, 2026
Statistics
- First champion: Kamui
- Most reigns: Yuya Susumu (2 reigns)
- Longest reign: Yuya Susumu (336 days)
- Shortest reign: Gaia Hox (164 days)
- Oldest champion: Kamui (41 years, 162 days)
- Youngest champion: Takahiro Katori (24 years, 283 days)
- Heaviest champion: Kengo (187 lbs)
- Lightest champion: Jun Masaoka (150 lbs)

The King of Freedom World Junior Heavyweight Championship, also referred to as the KFC Junior Championship (Japanese: KFCジュニア王座, Hepburn: KFC Junia Ōza), is a professional wrestling championship created and promoted by Pro Wrestling Freedoms. Only wrestlers under the junior heavyweight weight-limit may hold the championship.

There have been a total of seven reigns shared between six different champions. The current titleholder is Yuya Susumu who is in his second regin.

== History ==
On September 18, 2022, Pro Wrestling Freedoms announced an eight-man tournament that would crown the first King of Freedom World Junior Heavyweight Champion. On October 28, Freedoms announced the participants would be Kamui, Dragon Libre, Jun Masaoka, Leo Isaka, Yusaku Ito, Mataro Aoki, Brahman Kei and Rekka. At the "Go for it Freedoms! 2022" event, Kamui defeated Masaoka in the final to become the inaugural champion.

=== Inaugural tournament ===
First round November 9
Rekka	6:10
Mataro Aoki	Pin
Kamui	Pin
Yusaku Ito	6:46
Jun Masaoka	Pin
Brahman Kei	7:48
Leo Isaka	8:48
Dragon Libre	Pin

Semifinals; November 9
Mataro Aoki	12:59
Kamui	Pin
Jun Masaoka	Pin
Dragon Libre	17:06

Final; November 16
Kamui	Pin
Jun Masaoka	16:26

== Reigns ==
As of September 14, 2026.

Key
No.	Overall reign number
Reign	Reign number for the specific champion
Days	Number of days held
Defenses	Number of successful defenses
+	Current reign is changing daily

No.	Champion	Championship change			Reign statistics			Notes	Ref.
No.	Champion	Date	Event	Location	Reign	Days	Defenses	Notes	Ref.
1	Kamui	November 16, 2022	Go for it Freedoms! 2022	Tokyo, Japan	1	168	2	Defeated Jun Masaoka in the finals of a tournament to become the inaugural champion.	
2	Jun Masaoka	May 3, 2023	We Love Freedoms! We Are Freedoms! 2023	Tokyo, Japan	1	324	3		
3	Takahiro Katori	March 22, 2024	The Gekokujō 2024	Tokyo, Japan	1	177	3		
4	Yuya Susumu	September 15, 2024	Freedoms 15th Anniversary	Tokyo, Japan	1	336	5		
5	Kengo	August 17, 2025	Freedoms Feast Of The Free People 2025	Yokohama, Japan	1	221	3		
6	Gaia Hox	March 26, 2026	Freedoms The Gekokujo 2026	Tokyo, Japan	1	164	2		
7	Yuya Susumu	September 6, 2026	Freedoms Jiyu Hitotaichi No Kyoen 2026	Yokohama, Japan	2	8+	0		

== Combined reigns ==
As of September 14, 2026.

†	Indicates the current champion

Rank	Wrestler	No. of reigns	Combined defenses	Combined days
1	Yuya Susumu †	2	5	344+
2	Jun Masaoka	1	3	324
3	Kengo	1	3	221
4	Takahiro Katori	1	3	177
5	Kamui	1	2	168
6	Gaia Hox	1	2	164

== See also ==
- Professional wrestling in Japan
