= King of Freedom World Tag Team Championship =

Professional wrestling tag team championship

- The King of Freedom World Tag Team Championship belts

Details
- Promotion: Pro Wrestling Freedoms
- Date established: March 13, 2014
- Current champions: X-Trail (Kyu Mogami and Toru Sugiura)
- Date won: August 12, 2026
Statistics
- First champions: Great Kojika and The Winger
- Most reigns: As a team (2 reigns): The Brahman Brothers; Daisuke Masaoka and Violento Jack; As an individual (5 reigns): Violento Jack
- Longest reign: Mammoth Sasaki and Violento Jack (643 days)
- Shortest reign: Gentaro and Takashi Sasaki (3 days)
- Oldest champion: Great Kojika (71 years, 319 days)

The King of Freedom World Tag Team Championship, also referred to as the KFC Tag Championship (Japanese: KFCタッグ王座, Hepburn: KFC Taggu Ōza), is a professional wrestling tag team championship created and promoted by the Japanese promotion Pro Wrestling Freedoms.

== Title history ==
There have been a total of twenty-seven reigns and one vacancy shared between twenty-five different teams consisting of twenty-seven distinctive wrestlers. The current champions are Kyu Mogami and Toru Sugiura who are in their first reign as a team.

Key
No.	Overall reign number
Reign	Reign number for the specific team—reign numbers for the individuals are in parentheses, if different
Days	Number of days held
Defenses	Number of successful defenses
+	Current reign is changing daily

No.	Champion	Championship change			Reign statistics			Notes	Ref.
No.	Champion	Date	Event	Location	Reign	Days	Defenses	Notes	Ref.
1	Great Kojika and The Winger	March 13, 2014	Freedoms	Tokyo, Japan	1	194	3	Defeated Takashi Sasaki and Tatsuhito Takaiwa in a tournament final to become the inaugural champions.	
2	Unchain (Jun Kasai and Masashi Takeda)	September 23, 2014	Freedoms	Chiba, Japan	1	128	3		
3	El Hijo del Winger Dos and El Hijo del Winger Uno	January 29, 2015	Freedoms	Tokyo, Japan	1	35	0		
4	Gentaro and Kenichiro Arai	March 5, 2015	Reach For The Star 2015	Tokyo, Japan	1	18	0		
5	Black Buffalo and Susumu	March 23, 2015	The Gekokujō 2015	Tokyo, Japan	1	39	1		
6	Kamui and Mammoth Sasaki	May 1, 2015	We Love Freedoms! We Are Freedoms!	Tokyo, Japan	1	86	4		
7	Gentaro and Takashi Sasaki	July 26, 2015	Freedoms @ 24 Hours Pro-Wrestling	Tokyo, Japan	1 (2, 1)	3	0		
8	Unchain (Kenji Fukimoto and Minoru Fujita)	July 29, 2015	Midsummer Death Match Carnival At Verge Special	Tokyo, Japan	1	18	0		
9	Daisuke Masaoka and Kamui	August 16, 2015	Osaka Death Match Carnival 2015	Osaka, Japan	1 (1, 2)	102	3		
10	Gentaro and The Winger	November 26, 2015	Heel Don't Think	Tokyo, Japan	1 (3, 2)	294	4		
11	Hayata and Yuya Susumu	September 15, 2016	Takashi Sasaki Debut 20th Anniversary	Tokyo, Japan	1 (1, 2)	157	4	Yuya Susumu was previously known simply as Susumu.	
12	The Brahman Brothers (Brahman Kei and Brahman Shu)	February 19, 2017	Let's Set The Flag Of Glory Much Higher	Hiroshima, Japan	2	32	1	The Brahman Brothers were previously known as El Hijo del Winger Dos and El Hijo del Winger Uno.	
13	Mammoth Sasaki and Toru Sugiura	March 23, 2017	The Gekokujō 2017	Tokyo, Japan	1 (2, 1)	427	11		
14	Daisuke Masaoka and Violento Jack	May 24, 2018	F Spirit 2018	Tokyo, Japan	1 (2, 1)	215	2		
—	Vacated	December 25, 2018	—	—	—	—	—		
15	Daisuke Masaoka and Violento Jack	January 3, 2019	Happy New Freedom 2019	Tokyo, Japan	2 (3, 2)	14	0	Defeated Kamui and Toru Sugiura to win the vacant titles.	
—	Vacated	January 17, 2019	—	—	—	—	—		
16	Mammoth Sasaki and Violento Jack	January 17, 2019	Hot Free People 2019	Yokohama, Japan	1 (3, 3)	754	11	Defeated Kamui and Toru Sugiura to win the vacant titles.	
17	Unchain (Minoru Fujita and Rina Yamashita)	February 9, 2021	Go Beyond The Limit 2021	Tokyo, Japan	1 (2, 1)	107	1	This was a scramble tornado match.	
18	ERE (Takayuki Ueki and Toshiyuki Sakuda)	May 27, 2021	F Spirit 2021	Tokyo, Japan	1	212	2	This was a scramble tornado free weapon deathmatch.	
19	Soul Meat (Tomoya Hirata and Toru Sugiura)	December 25, 2021	Blood X'Mas 2021	Tokyo, Japan	1 (1, 2)	374	9	This was a Barbed Wire Board & Stone Ocean Self Produced Weapons Death Match.	
20	Mammoth Sasaki and Takashi Sasaki	January 3, 2023	Happy New FREEDOM 2023	Tokyo, Japan	1 (4, 2)	184	2		
21	Daisuke Masaoka and Toru Sugiura	July 6, 2023	Tokyo Death Match Carnival 2023 Vol. 1	Tokyo, Japan	1 (4, 3)	119	2		
22	ERE (Kyu Mogami and Toshiyuki Sakuda)	November 2, 2023	Be A Hero 2023	Tokyo, Japan	1 (1, 2)	252	3		
23	Kenji Fukimoto and Violento Jack	July 11, 2024	Jun Kasai Produce Tokyo Death Match Carnival 2024 Vol. 1	Tokyo, Japan	1 (2, 4)	66	1	This was a Double Board & Free Weapons Rule Death Match.	
24	Takashi Sasaki and Yamato	September 15, 2024	FREEDOMS 15th Anniversary	Yokohama, Japan	1 (3, 1)	101	2	This was a Free Weapons Death Match.	
25	Kenji Fukimoto and Violento Jack	December 25, 2024	FREEDOMS Blood X'Mas 2024	Tokyo, Japan	2 (3, 5)	84	3	This was a Double Board & Weapon Death Match.	
25	Masashi Takeda and Yusaku Ito	March 19, 2025	FREEDOMS The Gekokujo 2025	Tokyo, Japan	1 (2, 1)	310	6	This was a Double Hellboard & Free Weapon Death Match.	
26	Jun Kasai and Mizuki Watase	January 23, 2026	FREEDOMS Reach For The Star 2026	Tokyo, Japan	1 (2, 1)	201	6	This was a Fluorescent Lighttubes Death Match.	
27	X-Trail (Kyu Mogami and Toru Sugiura)	August 12, 2026	FREEDOMS Jun Kasai Produce Shinkiba Death Match Carnival 2026 Vol. 2	Tokyo, Japan	1 (2, 4)	86+	2	This was a Fluorescent Lighttubes Death Match.	

== Combined reigns ==
As of November 6, 2026.

†	Indicates the current champion

Rank	Wrestler	No. of reigns	Combined defenses	Combined days
1	Mammoth Sasaki and Violento Jack	1	11	754
2	Mammoth Sasaki and Toru Sugiura	1	11	427
3	Soul Meat (Tomoya Hirata and Toru Sugiura)	1	9	374
4	Masashi Takeda and Yusaku Ito	1	6	310
5	Gentaro and The Winger	1	4	294
6	ERE (Kyu Mogami and Toshiyuki Sakuda)	1	3	252
7	Daisuke Masaoka and Violento Jack	2	2	215
8	ERE (Takayuki Ueki and Toshiyuki Sakuda)	1	2	212
9	Jun Kasai and Mizuki Watase	1	6	201
10	Great Kojika and The Winger	1	3	194
11	Mammoth Sasaki and Takashi Sasaki	1	2	184
12	Hayata and Yuya Susumu	1	4	157
13	Kenji Fukimoto and Violento Jack	2	4	150
14	Unchain (Jun Kasai and Masashi Takeda)	1	3	128
15	Daisuke Masaoka and Toru Sugiura	1	2	119
16	Unchain (Minoru Fujita and Rina Yamashita)	1	1	107
17	Daisuke Masaoka and Kamui	1	3	102
18	Takashi Sasaki and Yamato	1	2	101
19	X-Trail † (Kyu Mogami and Toru Sugiura)	1	2	86+
20	Kamui and Mammoth Sasaki	1	4	86
21	The Brahman Brothers (Brahman Kei and Brahman Shu)	2 (Note: The Brahman Brothers won their first title reign under the names of El Hijo del Winger Dos and El Hijo del Winger Uno.)	1	67
22	Black Buffalo and Susumu	1	1	39
23	Gentaro and Kenichiro Arai	1	0	18
23	Unchain (Kenji Fukimoto and Minoru Fujita)	1	0	18
25	Gentaro and Takashi Sasaki	1	0	3

=== By wrestler ===
†	Indicates the current champion

Rank	Wrestler	No. of reigns	Combined defenses	Combined days
1	Mammoth Sasaki	4	28	1,452
2	Violento Jack	5	17	1,133
3	Toru Sugiura †	4	23	1,006+
4	Toshiyuki Sakuda	2	5	464
5	Daisuke Masaoka	4	7	450
6	Masashi Takeda	2	9	438
7	Tomoya Hirata	1	9	374
8	Kyu Mogami †	2	4	338+
9	Jun Kasai	2	9	329
10	Gentaro	3	4	315
11	Yusaku Ito	1	6	310
12	Takashi Sasaki	3	4	289
13	Takayuki Ueki	1	2	212
14	Yuya Susumu/Susumu	2	5	196
15	Mizuki Watase	1	6	201
16	Great Kojika	1	3	194
16	The Winger	1	3	194
18	Kamui	2	7	188
19	Kenji Fukimoto	3	4	168
20	Hayata	1	4	157
21	Minoru Fujita	2	2	125
22	Rina Yamashita	1	1	107
23	Yamato	1	2	101
24	Brahman Kei/El Hijo del Winger Dos	2	1	67
24	Brahman Shu/El Hijo del Winger Uno	2	1	67
26	Black Buffalo	1	1	39
27	Kenichiro Arai	1	0	18

== See also ==
- King of Freedom World Championship
- King of Freedom World Junior Heavyweight Championship
