= Violento Jack =

Mexican professional wrestler

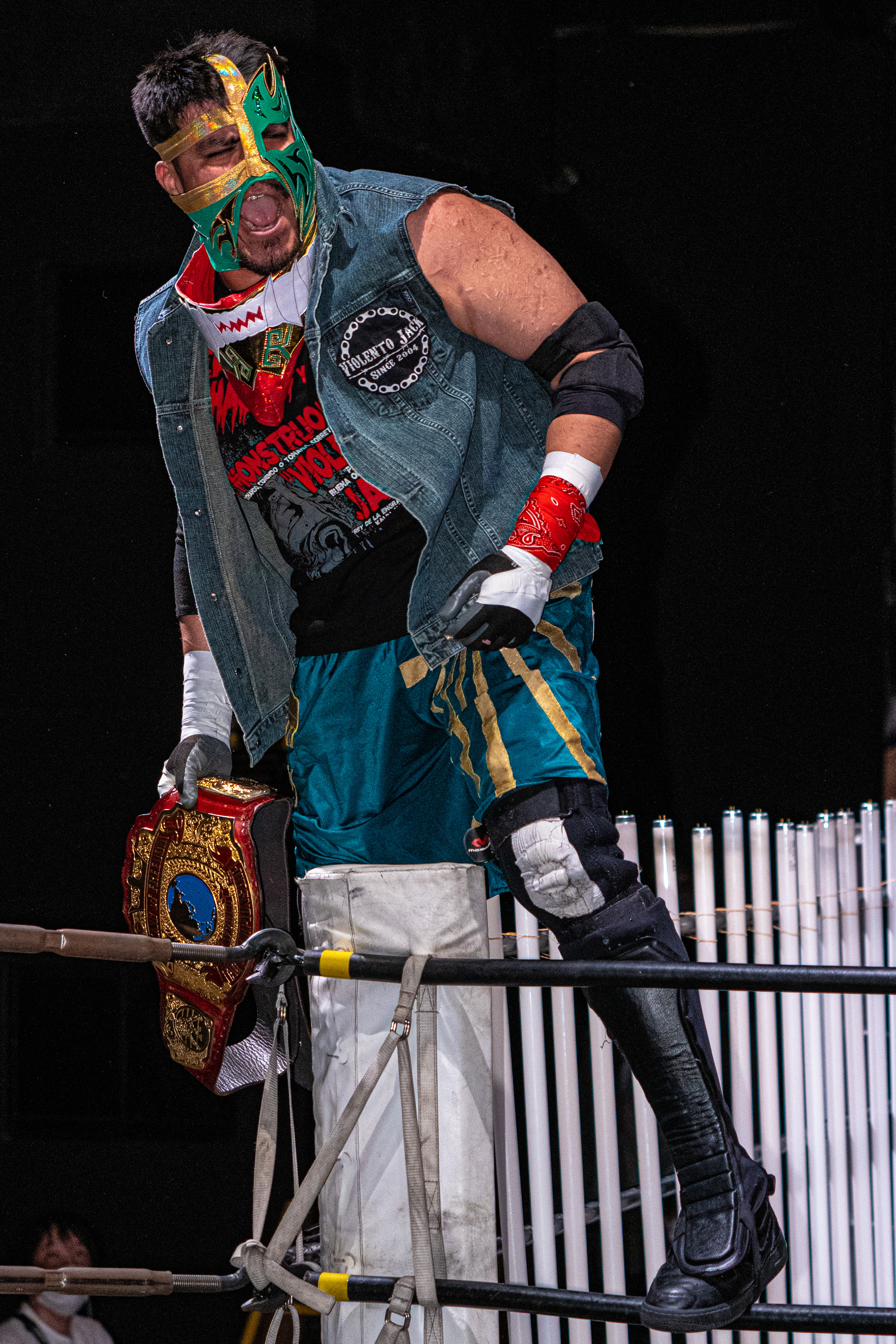
- Jack in June 2020

Personal information
- Born: August 21, 1989 (age 37) Cárdenas, Mexico

Professional wrestling career
- Ring name: Violento Jack
- Billed height: 180 cm (5 ft 11 in)
- Billed weight: 88 kg (194 lb)
- Trained by: Crazy Boy; Taz El Feroz
- Debut: 2004

Jack A. Romero better known by his ring name Violento Jack is a Mexican professional wrestler currently working for the Japanese promotion Pro Wrestling Freedoms where he is a former King of Freedom World Champion.

== Professional wrestling career ==
=== North American independent circuit (2004–present) ===
Romero worked in the American independent sscene since 2004. At a house show promoted by The Crash Lucha Libre on February 16, 2018, he teamed up with Aeroboy in a losing effort against Daga and Masada. At IWA Mid-South Hardcore Heartbreak, an event produced IWA Mid-South on February 17, 2018, Romero defeated Dale Patricks in singles action.

==== Game Changer Wrestling (2017–present) ====
Romero made his debut in Game Changer Wrestling at GCW Road To Survival on April 23, 2017, where he defeated Danny Havoc in an ultraviolent match. at GCW Hit 'Em Up on January 20, 2018, he unsuccessfully challenged Nick Gage for the GCW World Championship. At GCW Worst Behavior 2019 on August 22, he teamed up with Los Mazisos (Ciclope and Miedo Extremo) in a losing effort against Drew Parker, G-Raver and Jimmy Lloyd. One day later at GCW The New Face Of War 2019 he teamed up with Isami Kodaka and Takashi Sasaki to defeat Alex Colon, Eric Ryan and Masashi Takeda. At GCW Dead On Arrival on September 27, 2022, he teamed up with his "ERE" stablemates Drew Parker and Toshiyuki Sakuda in a losing effort against Mega Bastards (Alex Colon and John Wayne Murdoch) and Rina Yamashita.

=== Japanese independent circuit (2014-present) ===
Romero is known for competing in various promotions from the Japanese independent scene. At DDT Beer Garden Fight 2018, an event promoted by DDT Pro-Wrestling on August 3, 2018, he defeated Shunma Katsumata. At Sakaide Ribbon 2022, an event promoted by Ice Ribbon on May 14, 2022, he defeated Takashi Sasaki in singles competition. At Ice Ribbon BIG DEKAI Produce from October 10, he teamed up with Satsuki Totoro in a losing effort against Hartley Jackson and Yuna Manase in a mixed tag team match. He took part in the 2021 edition of Big Japan Pro Wrestling's Ikkitousen Strong Climb, where he competed in the Block A which he won with a total of six points after going against Masaya Takahashi, Abdullah Kobayashi and Jaki Numazawa, but fell short to Drew Parker in the semifinals. At Risa Sera Debut 10th Anniversary, an independent event produced by the Prominence stable on November 14, 2022, Romero competed in a 60-minute ironwoman match which concluded in a draw and also involved Akane Fujita, Miyako Matsumoto, Mochi Natsumi, Orca Uto, Takayuki Ueki and Risa Sera.

==== Pro Wrestling Freedoms (2016–present) ====
Romero is probably best known for his tenure with Pro Wrestling Freedoms. He made his first appearance in the promotion at FREEDOMS Crazy Monkey Presents Tokyo Death Match Carnival 2016 on July 13, where he defeated Jun Kasai to win the King of Freedom World Championship on his very debut. He has held the title on four different occasions during the time. Romero has competed in cross-over events between Freedoms and Active Advance Pro Wrestling due to the partnership between them. At FREEDOMS/2AW Versus on October 25, 2020, he teamed up with Mammoth Sasaki to defeat Ricky Fuji and Tank Nagai.

== Championships and accomplishments ==
- Alianza Universal De Lucha Libre
  - AULL Tag Team Championship (1 time) – with Aeroboy
- Desastre Total Ultraviolento
  - DTU World Extreme Championship (2 times)
- Global Les Catch
  - GLC Tag Team Championship (1 time) – with Aeroboy
- International Wrestling League
  - IWL Trios Championship (1 time, current) – with Dement Xtreme and Aeroboy
- King Bulls Wrestling
  - KBW Extremo Championship (1 time)
- Los Perros del Mal
  - PDM Extremo Championship (1 time)
- Pro Wrestling Freedoms
  - King of Freedom World Championship (5 times)
  - King of Freedom World Tag Team Championship (5 times) – with Daisuke Masaoka (2), Mammoth Sasaki (1) and Kenji Fukimoto (2)
- Pro Wrestling Illustrated
  - Ranked No. 313 of the top singles wrestlers in the PWI 500 in 2026
- Xtreme Latin American Wrestling
  - X-LAW Tag Team Championship (1 time) – with Aeroboy
