= Takashi Sasaki =

Japanese professional wrestler

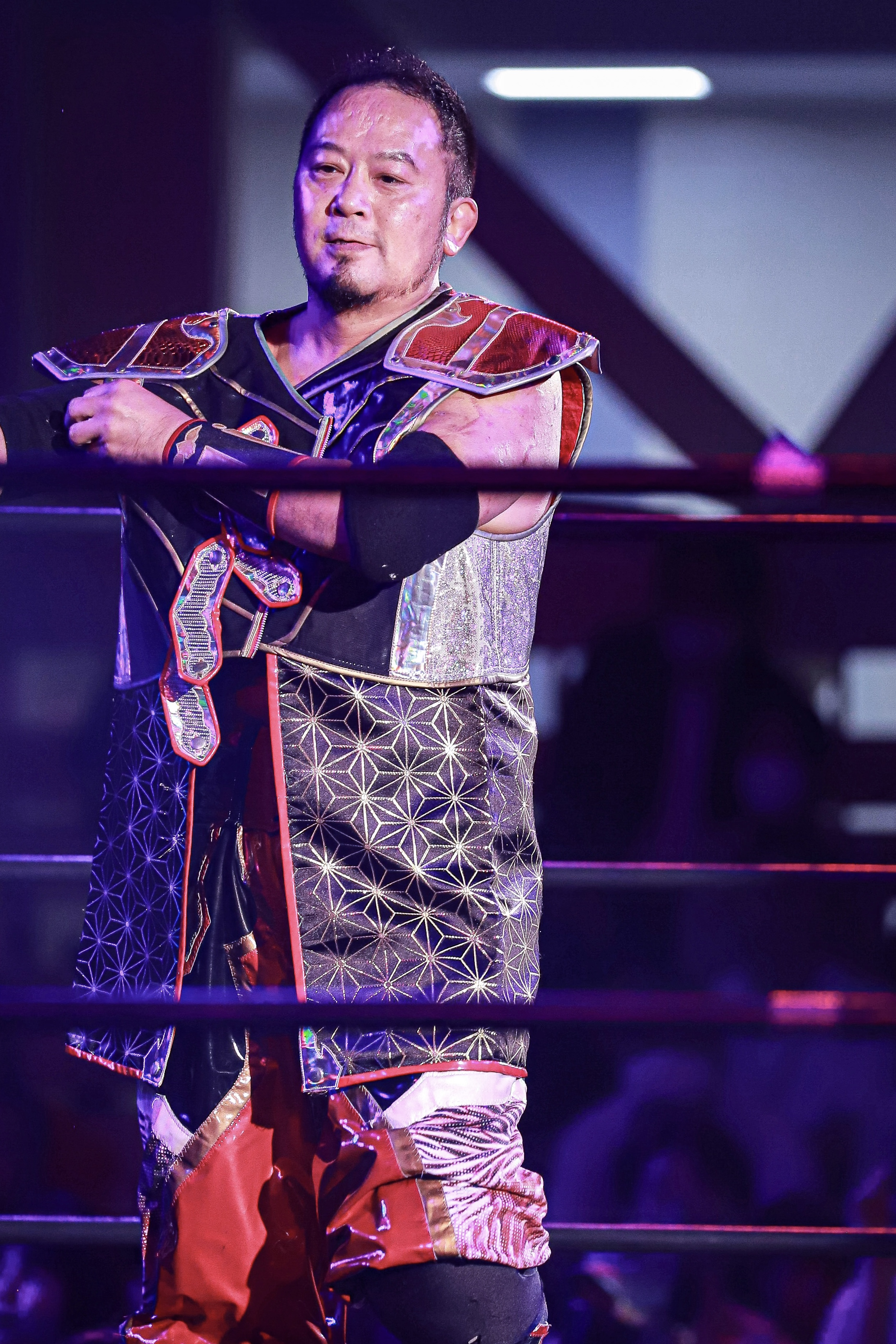
- Sasaki in July 2023

Personal information
- Born: January 16, 1975 (age 51) Ichinoseki, Japan

Professional wrestling career
- Ring name(s): Nasty Overtime Worker; Vacuum Mask; Western Tiger; Takashi Sasaki; Nango; Takatoge
- Billed height: 177 cm (5 ft 10 in)
- Billed weight: 90 kg (198 lb)
- Debut: 1996

Takashi Sasaki (佐々木貴, Sasaki Takashi) is a Japanese professional wrestler and the owner of Pro Wrestling Freedoms (Freedoms). A regular on the Japanese independent circuit for over 25 years, Sasaki began his career with IWA Kakutō Shijuku and Dramatic Dream Team before transitioning into the deathmatch wrestling scene in 2005 with Apache Pro-Wrestling Army and Big Japan Pro Wrestling. Following the closure of Apache Pro, Sasaki formed Pro Wrestling Freedoms in 2009.

Sasaki has held the KO-D Openweight Championship once, the BJW Deathmatch Heavyweight Championship twice and the King of Freedom World Championship once. He is also known for his tag team with Gentaro, the Aka-Rangers, and have held the KO-D Tag Team Championship twice, the WEW Tag Team Championship once and the BJW Tag Team Championship once.

== Professional wrestling career ==
Whilst studying media at Bunkyo University, Sasaki joined the IWA Kakutō Shijuku dojo and made his professional wrestling debut on September 15, 1996 against Tokai Bushido X. After graduating from university in March 1997, he joined Dramatic Dream Team.

=== Dramatic Dream Team (1997–2004) ===
Sasaki debuted for Dramatic Dream Team (DDT; now known as DDT Pro-Wrestling) on January 31, 1997, where he teamed up with Yusaku Shimoda in a losing effort to Super Uchuu Power and Wild Sheik. He joined DDT after graduating from university in March. He was a regular on Consejo Mundial de Lucha Libre (CMLL) tours of Japan in the late 90s and made several appearances for Wrestle Association-R (WAR) during its dying days. After a few short years, Sasaki had risen to upper mid-card status within DDT, just below wrestlers such as Exciting Yoshida, Poison Julie Sawada and Sanshiro Takagi. On June 2, 2001, Sasaki and Nosawa became the inaugural KO-D Tag Team Champions when they defeated Starman and Vertigo at a CMLL event in Mexico. The first title reign would not last long, however, as they lost the titles to Mikami and Super Uchuu Power on July 5. Sasaki would regain the titles with Mikami on December 12, defeating defending champions Gentaro and Yoshiya. The duo made two successful title defences before having the title vacated after Mikami suffered an injury on April 25, 2002.

From July to August, Sasaki teamed with Gentaro to participate in the KO-D Tag League 2002. They won four matches and drew one, giving them 13 points and progressed onto the semi-finals. On August 23, Sasaki and Gentaro won the vacant WEW Tag Team Championship by defeating Hi69 and Taka Michinoku. The following day, they would lose their semi final matchup vs. Mikami and Tanomusaku Toba and finished third place in the tournament after defeating Miyuki Maeda and Sanshiro Takagi on August 25. Sasaki and Gentaro, now known as Aka-Rangers (アカレンジャーズ, Akarenjāzu; sometimes written as 赤レンジャーズ; lit. Red Rangers), avenged their semi final loss on October 24 when they defeated Mikami and Toba for the KO-D Tag Team Championship. They lost the KO-D titles to Takagi and Tomohiko Hashimoto on January 31, 2003 and later the WEW titles on March 11 to Kintaro Kanemura and Tetsuhiro Kuroda. Gentaro would leave DDT in May but Sasaki's success continued. He won the KO-D Tag Team Championship with Tanomusaku Toba from Seiya Morohashi and Shoichi Ichimiya on May 22 and followed this up by winning the KO-D Openweight Championship from Mikami on July 17. Riding high, Sasaki entered the KO-D Tag League 2003 with Toba but suffered a tournament loss to Super Uchuu Power and Super Uchuu Power Omega, leading the team to vacate the tag titles. They reached the finals on September 28 but were unable to regain the titles, losing to Seiya Morohashi and Tomohiko Hashimoto. On October 15, Sasaki won the Ironman Heavymetalweight Championship. This would be a blessing in disguise, however, as he would be forced to defend both his championships at the upcoming Dead Or Alive event. On October 26, he lost the Ironman Heavymetalweight Championship to Danshoku Dino and the KO-D Openweight Championship to Ichimiya Gintaro.

The Aka-Rangers reformed in 2004, winning the KO-D Tag Team Championship for a second time, defeating Hero! and Kudo on February 11. They lost the titles to Ryuji Ito and Takagi on July 1 and soon after resigned from the promotion.

=== Apache Pro-Wrestling Army (2004–2009) ===
Following from their departure from DDT, the Aka-Rangers joined Apache Pro-Wrestling Army (Apache Pro). At the promotions first event, they lost to Daisuke Sekimoto and Ryuji Ito. The split with DDT was amicable and they returned to the promotion to participate in the KO-D Tag League 2004 but were eliminated before the semi-finals. As Apache Pro ran infrequently, Sasaki was free to wrestle for other companies such as Kaientai Dojo, Pro Wrestling Zero1 and most notably Big Japan Pro Wrestling (BJW). On November 28, the Aka-Rangers won the BJW Tag Team Championship from Abdullah Kobayashi and Jaki Numazawa. They successfully defended the titles on January 23 against Daisaku Shimoda and Tetsuhiro Kuroda but would eventually vacate the titles on September 13 due to lack of title defences.

In 2005, Sasaki began transitioning into a deathmatch wrestler. He teamed with Kintaro Kanemura in his first deathmatch on January 2 in a losing effort against Ryuji Ito and Shadow WX. He wrestled in progressively bloody matches which included barbed wire and fluorescent light tubes on his way to challenging for the BJW Deathmatch Heavyweight Championship. On June 8, he unsuccessfully challenged Ito for the deathmatch title in a 300 Fluorescent Light Tubes Deathmatch. Now established as a deathmatch specialist, he would split his time between Apache Pro and BJW. He formed a tag team with Ito and fought a series of deathmatches vs. 045 Junkies (Jaki Numazawa and Jun Kasai) and Muscle & Fat (Abdullah Kobayashi and Daisuke Sekimoto) throughout 2005.

On January 2, 2006, Sasaki turned on Apache Pro when he announced his intention to focus on his team with Ito at the expense of Apache Pro. He went on to form the Takashi Pro-Wrestling Gundam with Ito, Sekimoto, Tomohiko Hashimoto and several others, and became the top heel stable in Apache Pro alongside New Japan Pro-Wrestling (NJPW) invaders like Togi Makabe. On March 31, he won the BJW Deathmatch Heavyweight Championship from Abdullah Kobayashi in a Fluorescent Light Tubes & Kenzan Deathmatch. On June 4, he defeated Apache Pro ace Kintaro Kanemura. In August, he won a tournament with Badboy Hido to become win the vacant WEW Tag Team Championship; they'd lose the titles on September 24 to Jun Kasai and Tomoaki Honma. On September 10, Sasaki lost the BJW Deathmatch Heavyweight Championship to Ryuji Ito. During the match, however, Ito suffered a serious injury which kept him out for six months, causing the title to become vacant. Sasaki regained the title on December 3 when he defeated Numazawa in a Fluorescent Light Tubes Shrine Deathmatch. On March 14, 2007, Sasaki made his first successful title defence against Yuko Miyamoto in a Scaffold Deathmatch. The match was critically acclaimed among fans and Miyamoto impressed Sasaki enough for him to take Miyamoto under his wing and team together. On July 8, Sasaki defeated the returning Ryuji Ito to retain the BJW Deathmatch Heavyweight Championship in a 300 Fluorescent Light Tubes Deathmatch. However, Sasaki would fall in his third title defence, losing to Jaki Numazawa on August 26. After Makabe lost the WEW Heavyweight Championship in June, Makabe blamed Sasaki for the loss and defeated him in a hardcore match on September 23. Looking for revenge, on November 24, Sasaki teamed with Shadow WX and debuted for NJPW as part of their Lock Up brand but lost to Makabe and Toru Yano. Sasaki was finally able to gain a measure of revenge when he teamed with Mammoth Sasaki and defeated Makabe and Tomohiro Ishii on December 30. Their feud culminated in an eight man cage match on January 13, 2008, where Makabe's team came out victorious.

In February 2008, Apache Pro was rocked by a sexual harassment scandal involving their top star Kintaro Kanemura. The promotion ceased all activity but returned under Sasaki's leadership on June 13. Having lost fans and sponsors due to the scandal, the promotion struggled to stay afloat and eventually closed down for good after their final event on August 8, 2009.

=== Pro Wrestling Freedoms (2009–present) ===
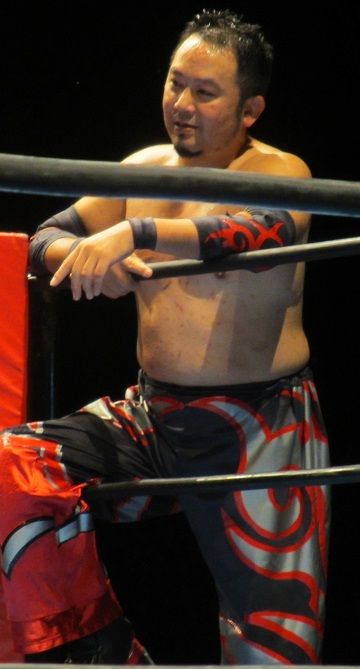
Sasaki in June 2015

Soon after Apache Pro's closure in August, Sasaki announced the creation of Pro Wrestling Freedoms (Freedoms) with Gentaro, Jun Kasai, Kumai, Mammoth Sasaki and The Winger. The promotion was formed with the motto “Freedom is in our hands” as Sasaki has opened the promotion to welcome every facet of professional wrestling. Despite this attitude, Freedoms has mainly become known for their deathmatch style. Freedoms held their first event on September 2. As with Apache Pro, Freedoms runs infrequently and wrestlers are free to wrestle for other promotions. Sasaki continued making regular appearances for Big Japan Pro Wrestling, even winning the 2011 Ikkitousen Deathmatch Survivor, but would pull away from the promotion in 2013 to focus on the running of Freedoms.

Sasaki became the first King of Freedom World Champion on May 2, 2013, after winning a three month knock-out tournament. From January to March 2014, Sasaki teamed with Tatsuhito Takaiwa to participate in the tournament to crown the inaugural King of Freedom Tag Team Championship. They made the tournament finals but lost to Great Kojika and The Winger. After four successful title defences and a year long title reign, Sasaki lost the King of Freedom World Championship to Yuji Hino on May 2, 2014. On July 7, 2015, Sasaki and Gentaro won the King of Freedom Tag Team Championship from Kamui and Mammoth Sasaki. Their title reign would be brief, however, losing the titles to Kenji Fukimoto and Minoru Fujita three days later.

On May 5, 2019, Sasaki won the Yokohama Shopping Street 6-Man Tag Team Championship with Ryuji Ito and Yuko Miyamoto from Abdullah Kobayashi, Hideki Suzuki & Yoshihisa Uto. On May 30, they lost the titles to the 3rd Generation Chimidoro Brothers (Masaya Takahashi, Takayuki Ueki and Toshiyuki Sakuda). On March 20, 2022, at Judgement 2022: DDT 25th Anniversary, he teamed up with Gentaro, Poison Sawada Julie, and Suicide Boyz (Mikami and Thanomsak Toba), being accompanied to the ring by Naomi Susan, to defeat Toru Owashi, Antonio Honda, Kazuki Hirata and Yoshihiko for the KO-D 10-Man Tag Team Championship. After a successful title defence on May 1, they lost the titles to The37Kamiina (Mao, Shunma Katsumata, Toui Kojima and Yuki Ueno) and Shinya Aoki on June 25.

== Other media ==
Sasaki appears as himself alongside Ryuji Ito, Abdullah Kobayashi, Jaki Numazawa and Daisuke Sekimoto in the 2006 movie Dirty Sanchez: The Movie. Sasaki and the other wrestlers perform wrestling moves on the three main cast members.

== Championships and accomplishments ==
- Big Japan Pro Wrestling
  - BJW Deathmatch Heavyweight Championship (2 times)
  - BJW Tag Team Championship (1 time) – with Gentaro
  - Yokohama Shopping Street 6-Man Tag Team Championship (1 time) – with Ryuji Ito and Yuko Miyamoto
  - Ikkitousen Deathmatch Survivor (2011)
- Dove Pro Wrestling
  - Dove Pro Tag Team Championship (1 time) – with Sakigake
- Dramatic Dream Team
  - Ironman Heavymetalweight Championship (1 time)
  - KO-D Openweight Championship (1 time)
  - KO-D Tag Team Championship (5 times) – with Nosawa Rongai (1), Mikami (1), Thanomsak Toba (1) and Gentaro (2)
  - KO-D 10-Man Tag Team Championship (1 time) – with Poison Sawada Julie, Gentaro, Mikami and Thanomsak Toba
- Game Changer Wrestling
  - GCW Tag Team Championship (1 time) – with Toru Sugiura
- Pro Wrestling Freedoms
  - King of Freedom World Championship (1 time)
  - King of Freedom World Tag Team Championship (3 times) – with Gentaro (1), Mammoth Sasaki (1) and Yamato (1)
  - Barefoot King Championship (2 times, current) – 1 time with Unagi Sayaka and 1 time as a singles wrestler.
- World Entertainment Wrestling
  - WEW World Tag Team Championship (2 times) – with Badboy Hido (1) and Gentaro (1)
