= Big Japan Pro Wrestling =

Japanese professional wrestling promotion established in 1995

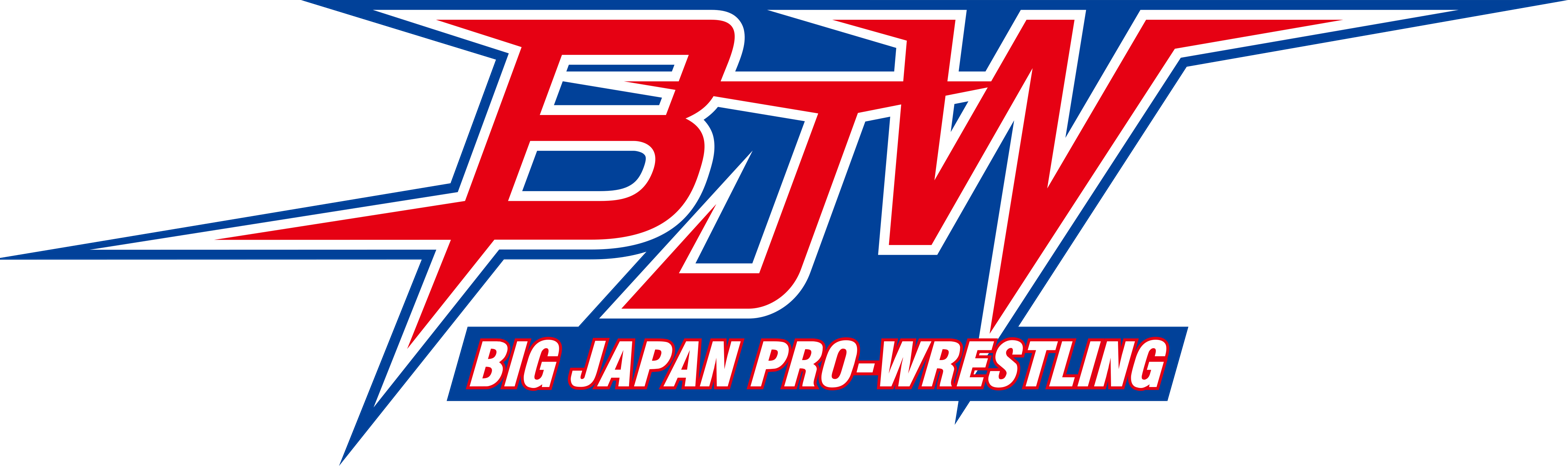
- Acronym: BJW
- Founded: March 16, 1995
- Style: Deathmatch; Strong style
- Headquarters: Yokohama, Kanagawa, Japan
- Founder(s): Shinya "Great" Kojika; Kendo Nagasaki
- Owner: Eiji Tosaka
- Predecessor: Network of Wrestling

Big Japan Pro Wrestling (大日本プロレス, Dai Nihon Puroresu) (BJW) is a Japanese professional wrestling promotion established in 1995. It is most famous for its deathmatch style contests.

== History ==
Big Japan Pro Wrestling was founded in March 1995 by former AJPW wrestlers Shinya Kojika and Kendo Nagasaki, during the boom period for Deathmatch wrestling in Japan. Kendo Nagasaki left in 1999; Shinya Kojika is still president of the company to date.

The promotion followed in the footsteps of organizations such as Frontier Martial-Arts Wrestling (FMW), Wrestling International New Generations (W*ING), and the International Wrestling Association of Japan (IWA Japan), who helped popularise a hard-hitting, violent and bloody style of wrestling known as the Deathmatch, or in more recent years, "hardcore" wrestling. These matches are usually weapon filled, using both "conventional" weapons (such as chairs and tables), as well as "extreme" weapons not usually seen in mainstream wrestling, and previously unused in wrestling at all. These weapons include but are by no means limited to, nails, thumbtacks, fire, and fluorescent light tubes. Barbed wire is also often used liberally in these matches, sometimes wrapped around other weapons, laid on the floor surrounding the ring, wrapped around the ring ropes, or even replacing the ropes altogether. In its early years, BJW was unable to directly compete with the budgets of its competition. This led to the innovation of several unique gimmick matches, many of which helped hide its monetary shortcomings. These include:

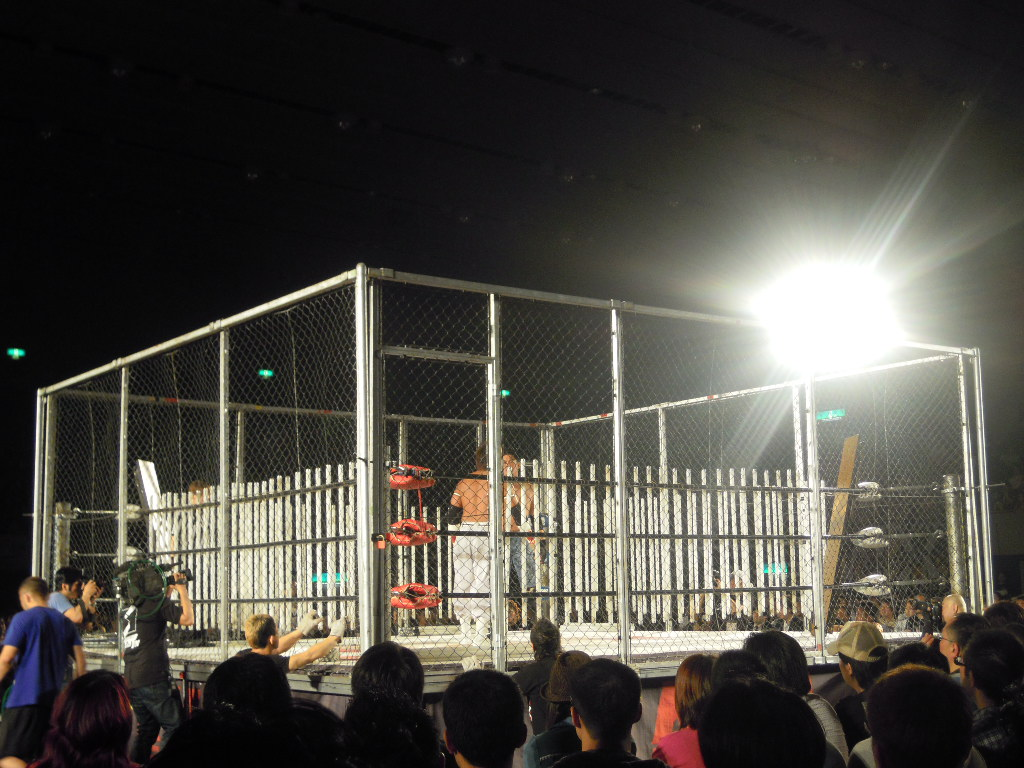
Steel cage deathmatch with 200 fluorescent light tubes – Ryuji Ito vs. Yuko Miyamoto at BJW 15th Anniversary Show ~Death & Crazy That's The Way Of The BJ-World~ on May 4, 2010

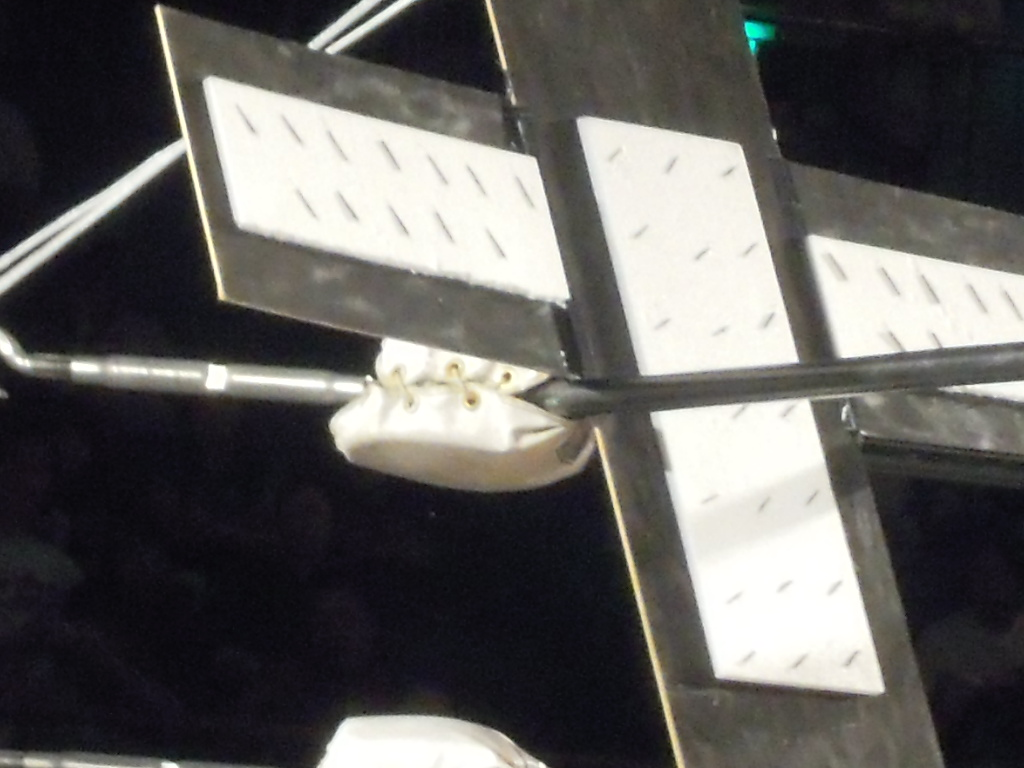
"Razor Blade Cross Board" – Six Man Tag Team Barbed Wire Razor Blade Death Match (Jun Kasai, D. J. Hyde and Nick Gage vs Jaki Numazawa, Isami Kodaka and Masashi Takeda) at BJW 15th Anniversary Show ~Death & Crazy That's The Way Of The BJ-World~ on May 4, 2010

- Circus Deathmatch – above the ring is a scaffold and under that scaffold, there is a type of circus net made of barbed wire. When a wrestler falls off the scaffold the barbed wire spider net is there to "catch" the wrestlers. After a wrestler, or a team of wrestlers, has been thrown into the net it is cut down and the match continues to a pinfall.
- Piranha Deathmatch – Barbed wire boards are placed in the corners. In the middle of the ring, there is a tank full of piranhas. To win, a competitor must hold their opponent in the tank for ten seconds.
- Scorpion Deathmatch– This match is similar to the Piranha Deathmatch, but with cacti replacing barbed wire boards and a tank full of scorpions rather than piranhas.
- Crocodile Deathmatch – Two wrestlers compete in a non-specific death match. The loser of the match must then go on to wrestle a crocodile. This type of match has only been performed once, between Shadow WX and Mitsuhiro Matsunaga.
- Fire Stone Deathmatch – Electrified space heaters wrapped in barbed wire surround the ring both outside and inside, and the match is won by pinfall.
- Big Japan W*ING Crisis Big Born Deathmatch (also known as "Crisis Big Born Deathmatch") – A match that combines several different deathmatch types. The match begins on a scaffold above a barbed wire net over a ring. The ring itself is surrounded by cacti, fire stones (electric space heaters wrapped in barbed wire), and dry ice. Thumbtacks are scattered in the ring. In the middle of the ring is a tank of scorpions. Various weapons including light bulbs, light tubes, baseball bats, drills, buzzsaws, and swords are permitted. The match is fought with all members of two teams active at the same time under hardcore street fight rules. When all the wrestlers have fallen into the barbed wire net, the next phase of the match begins. The barbed wire net is removed and the match continues. Wrestlers leave and win the match by submission, by having their head put in the scorpion tank for ten seconds, or by passing out.
- "Ancient Way" Death Match – Both fighters wrap their hands in hemp rope, which is then coated in honey and dipped in broken glass to make them deadly weapons.

Away from the Deathmatches, BJW also has had well-established normal wrestling titles. On February 3, 1998, Yoshihiro Tajiri won a one-night-only 8-man tournament in Tokyo to crown BJW's first World Junior Heavyweight Champion. This match showed a distinct departure from the violent matches BJW is known for. The company also has had a World Heavyweight Championship, a World Women's Championship, a World Tag Team Championship, and a World 4-Man Tag Team Shuffle Championship. Although the World Tag Team and Deathmatch, titles are the only ones still active.

Currently, the BJW roster is split into "Deathmatch BJ", "Strong BJ" and "Strong J". The deathmatch workers wrestle for the BJW Deathmatch Heavyweight Championship, the non-deathmatch heavyweight workers for the BJW World Strong Heavyweight Championship, and the junior heavyweight workers for the BJW Junior Heavyweight Championship.

== Big Japan Pro Wrestling Core ==
Big Japan Pro Wrestling Core (BJW Core) is a video-on-demand service owned by Big Japan Pro Wrestling. In November 2017, BJW announced "Big Japan Pro Wrestling Core", a new worldwide video-on-demand site for the promotion's events. The service features matches from the promotion's archives, dating back to 1995. The service has a current monthly subscription price of ¥888. In December 2018, BJW announced that the service would shut down at the end of the year, with plans to relaunch in February 2019 using a new service provider. The service was then reactivated.

== Working relationships ==
Big Japan has had interpromotional feuds with both New Japan Pro-Wrestling (NJPW) and Combat Zone Wrestling (CZW). These were both kayfabe feuds that were done to generate more income for both companies. During late 1996 and early 1997, BJW agreed with NJPW. Being a relatively new promotion, BJW needed mainstream publicity. NJPW agreed to a feud, which would allow Big Japan wrestlers to appear in their company and use New Japan's popularity to give exposure to their company. In return, Big Japan agreed to lose the feud and the majority of the interpromotional matches, therefore strengthening the New Japan brand. The situation provided an interesting clash of wrestling styles, as NJPW often favored a strong style of competition. The two promotions held Wrestling World 1997, the biggest event during the interpromotional feud and the fifth January 4 Tokyo Dome Show. In the late 1990s and into the 2000s, BJW competed against CZW. CZW was a relatively new American promotion at the time, and also largely focused on an extreme style of wrestling. Wrestlers feuded in both companies having matches in the United States and Japan. During the CZW feud, top star Tomoaki Honma departed the company to become a freelancer.

In 2008, BJW entered into a working relationship with Chikara. In October 2008, several BJW wrestlers went to America and faced Chikara in The Global Gauntlet. BJW did well, winning the best of five series on night one, but narrowly lost the Global Gauntlet match on the second night. In 2009, BJW hosted Chikara's inaugural Japanese tour.

In 2011, BJW established a three-way working relationship with CZW and German promotion Westside Xtreme Wrestling (wXw), which led to the creation of the World Triangle League tournament. The working relationship ended in 2015.

BJW has also had a long working relationship with the Union Pro Wrestling promotion, which has included BJW workers holding titles in Union Pro and vice versa. The relationship ended in 2014 when UPW shut down.

On December 15, 2023, BJW was announced as one of the founding members of the United Japan Pro-Wrestling alliance, a joint effort to further develop professional wrestling in Japan through promotion and organization, with Seiji Sakaguchi being named as the chairman of the project.

== Roster ==
=== Deathmatch BJ ===
| Ring name | Real name | Notes |
|---|---|---|
| Abdullah Kobayashi | Yōsuke Kobayashi | BJW Death Match Heavyweight Championship |
| AKIRA | Alexander James Atkisson | |
| Hideyoshi Kamitani | Hideyoshi Kamitani | |
| Kankuro Hoshino | Naotake Hoshino | |
| Kazumi Kikuta | Kazumi Kikuta | |
| Masaya Takahashi | Masaya Takahashi | |
| Ryuji Ito | Ryuji Ito | |

=== Strong BJ ===
| Ring name | Real name | Notes |
|---|---|---|
| Daichi Hashimoto | Daichi Hashimoto | Yokohama Shopping Street 6-Man Tag Team Champion |
| Daisuke Sekimoto | Daisuke Sekimoto | |
| Hideyoshi Kamitani | Hideyoshi Kamitani | |
| Kazumi Kikuta | Kazumi Kikuta | |
| Kazumasa Yoshida | Kazumasa Yoshida | BJW World Strong Heavyweight Champion |
| Koshiro Asakura | Koshiro Asakura | |
| Ryota Hama | Ryota Hama | |
| Takuya Nomura | Takuya Nomura | |
| Yasufumi Nakanoue | Yasufumi Nakanoue | |
| Yuichi Taniguchi | Yuichi Taniguchi | |
| Yuya Aoki | Yuya Aoki | |

=== Strong J ===
| Ring name | Real name | Notes |
|---|---|---|
| Kazuki Hashimoto | Kazuki Hashimoto | |
| Kota Sekifuda | Kota Sekifuda | |
| Kosuke Sato | Kosuke Sato | BJW Junior Heavyweight Champion |
| Ryuki Sekimo | Ryuki Sekimo | |
| Tatsuhiko Yoshino | Tatsuhiko Kimura | |
| Yuki Morihiro | Masaki Morihiro | Referee |

=== Freelancers ===
| Ring name | Real name | Notes |
|---|---|---|
| Andy Wu | Unknown | |
| Banana Senga | Tatsuhito Senga | |
| Brahman Kei | Kei Sato | |
| Brahman Shu | Shu Sato | |
| Chicharito Shoki | Chicharito Shoki | 2AW |
| Connor King | Connor King | Aotearoa Wrestling |
| Daiju Wakamatsu | Daiki Wakamatsu | 2AW |
| Dale Patricks | Michael Passmore | |
| Ender Kara | Ender Kara | |
| Fuminori Abe | Fuminori Abe | |
| Hiroyuki Suzuki | Takayoshi Suzuki | Niigata; Wakashishi Kikusui Cup Champion |
| Isami Kodaka | Isami Kodaka | Pro-Wrestling Basara |
| Joji Otani | Joji Otani | Yokohama Shopping Street 6-Man Tag Team Champion |
| Jordan Macallan | Jordan Macallan | Aotearoa Wrestling |
| Kohei Sato | Kohei Sato | |
| Koju Takeda | Takeda Koju | Wrestling of Darkness 666 |
| Leyton Buzzard | Leighton Buzzard | |
| Madman Pondo | Kevin Canady | |
| Masashi Takeda | Masashi Takeda | |
| Minoru Fujita | Minoru Fujita | |
| Michio Kageyama | Michio Kageyama | Team Certified Drazeger Champion |
| Rekka | Rekka | |
| Satsuki Nagao | Souki Nagao | Pro Wrestling Zero1 |
| Shigehiro Irie | Shigehiro Irie | |
| So Daimonji | Takashi Daimonji | Pro Wrestling Land's End |
| Takumi Tsukamoto | Takumi Tsukamoto | Pro-Wrestling Basara |
| Tempesta | Tempesta | |
| Tomato Kaji | Kaji Tomato | |
| Tsutomu Ohsugi | Tsutomu Osugi | |
| Yuko Miyamoto | Yuko Miyamoto Pro-Wrestling Basara | |
| Yusaku Ito | Yusaku Ito | |

=== Staff ===
| Ring name | Real name | Notes |
|---|---|---|
| Daikokubo Benkei | Kazumi Kotani | Retired wrestler |
| Eiji Tosaka | Eiji Tosaka | Announcer; Owner |
| Frank Atsushi | Atsushi Ohashi | Referee |
| Great Kojika | Shinya Kojika | Chairman; Occasional wrestler |
| Mac Takeda | Hiroki Takeda | Referee |
| Ryohei Nakatani | Ryohei Nakatani | Referee |
| Ryuji Yamakawa | Seiji Yamakawa | Retired wrestler Makes occasional appearances |
| Yuji Kumawaka | Yuji Kumawaka | Announcer |
| Yuji Shindo | Yuji Shindo | Announcer |

== Notable alumni/guests ==
=== Male ===
- Abdullah the Butcher
- Akira Hyodo
- Alejandro
- Astroman
- Axl Rotten
- Craig
- Crazy Sheik
- Daichi Kakimoto
- Daigoro Kashiwa
- Daiju Wakamatsu
- Daikokubo Benkei
- Daisuke Masaoka
- DJ Nira
- Fuma
- Gedo
- Gentaro
- Hayato Tamura
- Homicide
- HUB
- The Iceman
- Jado
- James Keenan
- Jason Ray Nope
- Kid Lykos
- Kamikaze
- Kyu Mogami
- Jun Kasai
- Junya Matsunaga
- Kazuo Sakurada
- Kintaro Kanemura
- Koji Doi
- Kohei Kinoshita
- Kuuga
- Mad Man Pondo
- Masada
- Masato Inaba
- Mike Samples
- Mitsuhiro Matsunaga
- Miyawaki
- Musashi
- Naka Shuma
- Necro Butcher
- Nobuhiro Shimatani
- Ryota Nakatsu
- Sagat
- Shadow WX
- Shinya Ishikawa
- Shoki Kitamura
- Shu Asakawa
- Takashi Sasaki
- Takato Nakano
- Takuho Kato
- Takumi Baba
- Mr. Pogo
- Takoyakida
- Tank Nagai
- Tarzan Goto
- Tomoaki Honma
- Tomomitsu Matsunaga
- Towa Iwasaki
- Tristan Archer
- Violento Jack
- Yoshihiro Tajiri
- Yoshihisa Uto
- Yoshikazu Yokoyama
- Yusuke Kubo

=== Female ===
- Akane Fujita
- Aoi Kizuki
- Ayame Sasamura
- Azumi Hyuga
- Command Bolshoi
- Giulia
- Mika Iwata
- Misae Genki
- Kiyoko Ichiki
- Gami
- Hanako Nakamori
- Itsuki Aoki
- Kazuki
- Kyoko Kimura
- Maika Ozaki
- Mochi Miyagi
- Sachie Abe
- Sawako Shimono
- Suzu Suzuki
- Tequila Saya
- Yuu Yamagata

=== CZW Warriors (2000–2002) ===
A derivation of this stable also appeared in Fire Pro Wrestling Returns as the Mad Gaijins, which consisted of Mad Man Pondo and 2 Tuff Tony.

- Nick Mondo
- John Zandig
- Johnny Kashmere
- Justice Pain
- Nate Hatred
- Nick Berk
- Nick Gage
- Ruckus
- Trent Acid
- Van Hammer
- Wifebeater

== Championships ==
As of November 22, 2026.

=== Current ===
This is a list of championships promoted by the company. Some of them are not created by it.

| Championship | Current champion(s) | Reign | Date won | Days held | Location | Notes |
|---|---|---|---|---|---|---|
| BJW Deathmatch Heavyweight Championship | Abdullah Kobayashi | 7 | January 2, 2026 | 324+ | Tokyo, Japan | Defeated Yusaku Ito at BJW 2026 New Year's Battle Begins. |
| BJW World Strong Heavyweight Championship | Kazumasa Yoshida | 1 | April 29, 2026 | 207+ | Yokohama, Japan | Defeated So Daimonji at BJW Big Japan 31 Beyond The Survivor. |
| BJW Tag Team Championship | Kazumi Kikuta and Toru Sugiura | 1 (2, 1) | December 30, 2025 | 327+ | Tokyo, Japan | Defeated Kankuro Hoshino and Ryuji Ito BJW. |
| BJW Junior Heavyweight Championship | Shoki Kitamura | 1 | August 23, 2026 | 91+ | Yokohama, Japan | Defeated Kosuke Sato at BJW. |
| Yokohama Shopping Street 6-Man Tag Team Championship | Yosomono (Daichi Hashimoto, So Daimonji and Joji Otani) | 1 (7, 1, 1) | July 26, 2026 | 119+ | Nagoya, Japan | Defeated Kengo Takai, Kenta Kosugi and Mari Manji at BJW Death Market 91. |

=== Formerly promoted ===
| Championship | Last champion | Reign | Date won | Location | Notes |
|---|---|---|---|---|---|
| All Asia Heavyweight Championship | So Daimonji | 1 | June 6, 2023 | Yokohama, Japan | Defeated Dylan James to win the reactivated title. |
| UWA World Tag Team Championship | Aijin Tag (Masato Kamino and Takato Nakano) | 1 (1, 1) | September 11, 2024 | Tokyo, Japan | Defeated Tomato Kaji and Kota Sekifuda at BASARA Tsukamoto & Nakatsu Anniversary Festival. |

=== Defunct ===
| Championship | Final champion(s) | Date won |
|---|---|---|
| BJW Heavyweight Championship | Men's Teioh | September 5, 2004 |
| BJW Women's Championship | Kaori Yoneyama | January 2, 2003 |
| BJW Junior Heavyweight Championship (1998–2002) | Homicide | November 15, 2002 |
| BJW 8-Man Scramble Championship | Kiyoko Ichiki | May 14, 2000 |

=== Formerly promoted ===
| Championship | Last champion(s) | Date won |
|---|---|---|
| FMW/WEW Hardcore Tag Team Championship | Saburo Inematsu & Ryuichi Sekine | April 12, 2015 |
| Sakatako Intercontinental Tag Team Championship | Abdullah Kobayashi & Takayuki Ueki | October 2, 2016 |

== Tournaments ==
BJW also holds annual tournaments to decide the top wrestler or tag team in the promotion:

| Tournament | Latest winner(s) | Date won |
|---|---|---|
| Ikkitousen Strong Climb | Daisuke Sekimoto | February 20, 2022 |
| Ikkitousen Deathmatch Survivor | Hideyoshi Kamitani | July 25, 2024 |
| Saikyo Tag League | Abdullah Kobayashi & Daiju Wakamatsu | February 13, 2023 |
| King of Deathmatch World GP | AKIRA | December 31, 2024 |

== Broadcasters ==
Domestic:

- Fighting TV Samurai
- Nico Nico Douga

Worldwide:

- BJW Core

== See also ==
- Professional wrestling in Japan
- List of professional wrestling promotions in Japan
- Fire Pro Wrestling Returns
