= Brahman Brothers =

Professional wrestling tag team

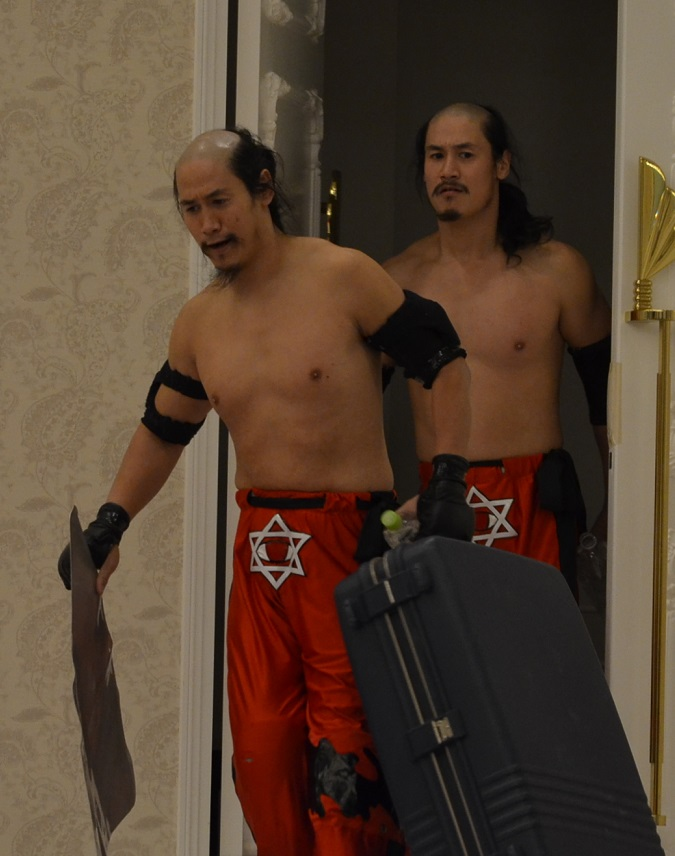
- The Brahman Brothers in November 2013

Personal information
- Born: Kei Sato; Shu Sato; 5 July 1977 (age 49) (both) Yokohama, Kanagawa, Japan

Professional wrestling career
- Ring name(s): Brahman Brothers; Brahman Shu and Brahman Kei; Demon Spiders; Ginkaku and Kinkaku; Los Wingers; Neo Devil Pierroths; Sailor Boys; Shu Sato and Kei Sato; Syachihoko Machines; Yokohama ga Unda Baka Kyōdai
- Billed height: 1.70 m (5 ft 7 in) (both)
- Billed weight: 82 kg (181 lb) (both)
- Debut: 11 May 2002

Shu Sato (佐藤秀, Satō Shū) and Kei Sato (佐藤恵, Satō Kei) (both born on 5 July 1977) are identical twins and professional wrestlers better known by the ring names Brahman Shu (バラモン・シュウ, Baramon Shū) and Brahman Kei (バラモン・ケイ, Baramon Kei) and the team name Brahman Brothers (バラモン兄弟, Baramon Kyōdai). They are freelancers, currently working most notably for the Big Japan Pro Wrestling (BJW), Michinoku Pro Wrestling (MPW), and Pro Wrestling Freedoms (Freedoms) promotions, and are currently three-time UWA World Tag Team Champions. They are also one-time WEW Hardcore Tag Team Champions and record four-time Tohoku Tag Team Champions, while Kei has also held the title a fifth time with The Great Sasuke. They have also been in El Dorado Wrestling (El Dorado) as co-leaders of the Hell Demons faction. Shu is also a former Tohoku Junior Heavyweight Champion. They are currently the Barefoot King Champions in Pro Wrestling Freedoms.

== Professional wrestling career ==
=== Japanese independent scene (2002-present) ===
The twin brothers originally debuted as the masked Shachihoko Machines. In 2002 on T2P's last show, they unmasked and went to the Toryumon X promotion. They joined up with Taiji Ishimori and became known as the Sailor Boys. They then jumped to Michinoku Pro and continued using their Sailor Boy gimmicks. In 2005, they would both turn heel and joined the Stoned faction, created by Kagetora. Their new heel style has caused them to become violent and weapon-friendly. This set them up with their new Brahman characters. In Michinoku Pro the Sato brothers defeated Kaientai Dojo (K-Dojo)'s Shiori Asahi and Makoto Oishi to win the Tohoku Tag Team Championship on 10 June 2006. There championship reign was short lived as they lost the championship 37 days later to Osaka Pro Wrestling's Flash Moon and Tigers Mask. Shu and Kei won the Tohoku Tag Team Championship for the second time by betting Flash Moon and Tigers Mask on 8 October 2006. The Sato's defended the Tohoku Tag Team Championships vs Osaka Pro's Billyken Kid and Masamune on 9 March 2007 Shu pinned Masamune after hitting the Nazi Zombie. They lost the Tohoku Tag Team Championship on 21 April 2007 to Kagetora and Rasse. The Sato brothers have also been wrestling in Hustle as the Demon Spiders and the Neo Devil Pierroths.

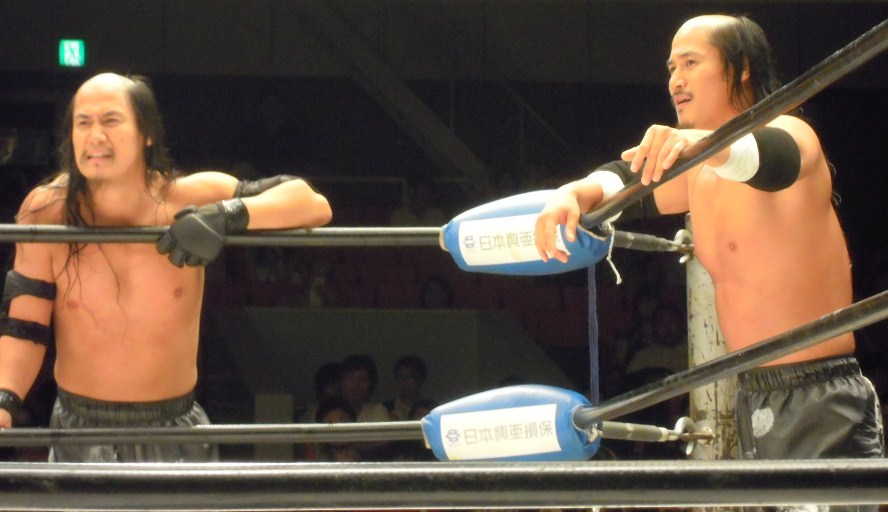
The Brahman Brothers in July 2010

In El Dorado, they were initially members of the Stoned faction. However, in a double betrayal, Takuya Sugawara betrayed both his own faction of Aagan Iisou and Stoned leader Kagetora, taking over the leadership of Stoned and renaming it Hell Demons. The Brahman brothers won the UWA World Trios Championship with Maguro Ooma on 3 June 2006 and later vacated the belts. On 9 August 2007, The Brahman Brothers and Takuya Sugawara defeated Toru Owashi, Kagetora and Hercules Oosenga to win the vacant UWA World Trios Championship for the second time. The Hell Demons first defended the UWA World Trios Championship on 26 August 2007 by defeating Kaientai Dojo's Yuji Hino, Makoto Oishi and Shiori Asahi. The Hell Demons next defended the UWA World Trios Championship on 29 December 2007 by defeating brother Yasshi, Jumping Kid Okimoto and Dick Togo in a ladder match. At the end of the match Shu and Kei kicked Sugawara out of Hell Demons vacating The UWA World Trios Championship. Shu and Kei are currently the co-leaders of the Hell Demons. On 3 December 2008 the Brahman brothers won the UWA World Tag Team Championship from Tsutomu Oosugi and Hercules Oosenga. Shu and Kei beat The Great Sasuke and Yoshitsune on 18 January 2009 to win the Tohoku Tag Team Championship for the 3rd time and successfully defend the UWA World Tag Team Championship in a double title match. The Sato brothers are the first and only tag team to hold the UWA World Tag Team Championship and Tohoku Tag Team Championship at the same time. Shu and Kei lost the Tohoku Tag Team Championship on 15 March 2009 to Kesen Numajiro and Kinya Oyanagi. Shu and Kei have also been competing in Apache Pro-Wrestling making their first appearance on 19 February 2009 winning a match vs Takashi Sasaki and Jun Kasai and also on 16 March 2009 teaming up with Ken45° to take on Takashi Sasaki and Masashi Takeda in a Handicap Match Shu Kei and Ken45° got the win over Sasaki and Takeda the 2 matches were Apache Rules matches. Shu and Kei returned to Apache pro on 17 April 2009 to face the team of Takashi Sasaki and Tetsuhiro Kuroda Shu and Kei lost the match when Sasaki beat Kei. Shu and Kei won the WEW Hardcore Tag Team Championship on 6 May 2009 from Kaientai Dojo's Yoshiya and Hardcore Kid Kojiro. Shu and Kei defended the WEW Hardcore Tag Team Championship on 9 June 2009 in a three-way match defeating JOE and Quiet Storm and Daigoro Kashiwa and Psycho. On 26 August 2009 Shu and Kei successfully defended the UWA World Tag Team Championship vs Takuya Sugawara and Minoru Fujita. On 23 September 2009 Shu and Kei successfully defended the WEW Hardcore Tag Team Championship vs the team of Taishi Takizawa and Hiro Tonai. Shu and Kei will challenge Takeshi Minamino and Maguro Ooma on 13 February 2010 for the Tohoku Tag Team Championship. On December 27, 2012, the Brahmans made their debut for Wrestling New Classic (WNC), defeating Jiro Kuroshio and Yoshiaki Yago in a Hair vs. Hair Tables, Ladders, and Chairs match, forcing Kuroshio to have his head shaved. On May 5, 2014, Shu won his first singles title, when he defeated Manjimaru in a tournament final for the vacant Tohoku Junior Heavyweight Championship. On June 8, Kei and The Great Sasuke won the Tohoku Tag Team Championship. In 2015, the Brahmans began working for the Pro Wrestling Freedoms (Freedoms) promotion under masks and the ring names El Hijo del Winger Uno and El Hijo del Winger Dos, winning the King of Freedom World Tag Team Championship on January 29, 2015. On June 17, 2015, the Brahman Brothers won the UWA World Tag Team Championship for the second time, this time in the Union Pro Wrestling (Union Pro) promotion.

== Championships and accomplishments ==
- Big Japan Pro Wrestling

- BJW Tag Team Championship (1 time)
- UWA World Tag Team Championship (3 times, current)
- Yokohama Shopping Street 6-Man Tag Team Championship (2 times) – with Takayuki Ueki (1) and Tatsuhiko Yoshino (1)
- 1Day Tag Tournament (2013)
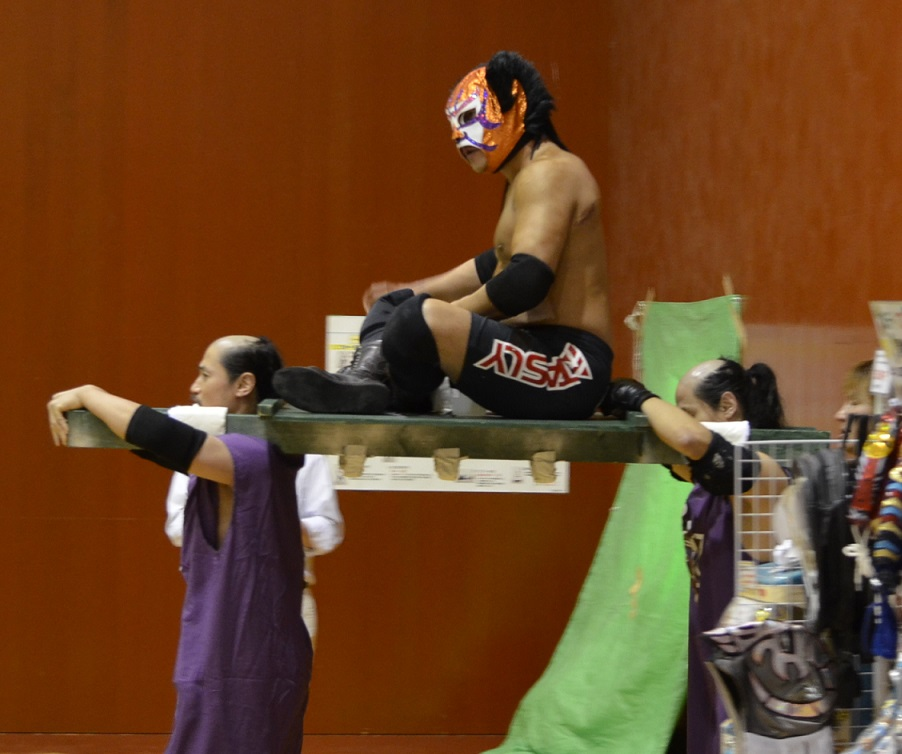
  Mu no Taiyo in May 2014

- DDT Pro-Wrestling

- KO-D 6-Man Tag Team Championship (1 time) – with Gorgeous Matsuno

- El Dorado Wrestling

- UWA World Tag Team Championship (1 time)
- UWA World Trios Championship (1 time) – with Takuya Sugawara

- Japan Indie Awards

- Best Unit Award (2008, 2009, 2011, 2012)
- Best Unit Award (2014) – with The Great Sasuke as Mū no Taiyō

- Kaientai Dojo

- WEW Hardcore Tag Team Championship (1 time)

- Michinoku Pro Wrestling

- Tohoku Junior Heavyweight Championship (1 time) – Shu
- Tohoku Tag Team Championship (5 times) – Kei and Shu (4), Kei and The Great Sasuke (1)
- Futaritabi Tag Team League (2006, 2014)

- Pro Wrestling Freedoms

- Barefoot King Championship (1 time)
- King of Freedom World Tag Team Championship (2 times)

- Union Pro Wrestling

- UWA World Tag Team Championship (1 time)
