= Masashi Takeda =

Japanese professional wrestler

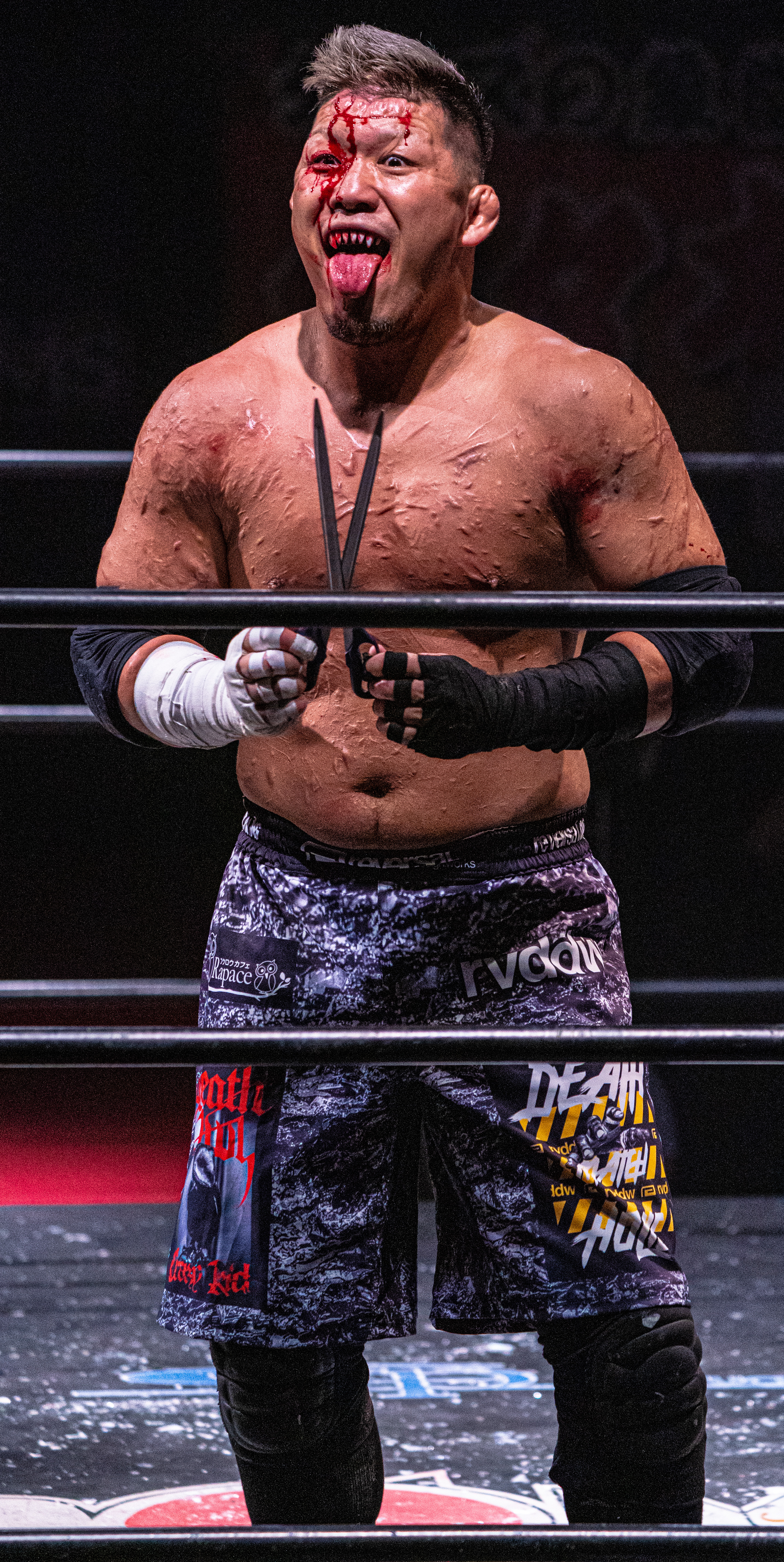
- Takeda in June 2020

Personal information
- Born: Masashi Takeda (竹田 誠志, Takeda Masashi); August 13, 1985 (age 41) Machida, Tokyo
- Spouse: Yuka Omori (m. 2019; died 2022)
- Children: 1

Professional wrestling career
- Ring name: Masashi Takeda
- Billed height: 173 cm (5 ft 8 in)
- Billed weight: 87 kg (192 lb)
- Trained by: Jun Kasai
- Debut: January 20, 2007

Masashi Takeda (竹田 誠志, Takeda Masashi; born August 13, 1985) is a Japanese professional wrestler and mixed martial artist, primarily working for Big Japan Pro Wrestling (BJW) in the Deathmatch division. Takeda also competes as a freelancer for Freedoms and occasionally, All Japan Pro Wrestling (AJPW).

== Early life ==
While in junior high school, Takeda discovered deathmatch wrestling and mixed martial arts, becoming a huge fan of both. After graduating from high school, he enrolled in the U-File Camp, training for a career in MMA. After receiving some pro wrestling training from Jun Kasai, Takeda debuted as a wrestler for Style-E in January 2007.

== Professional wrestling career ==
=== Big Japan Pro Wrestling (2008–present) ===
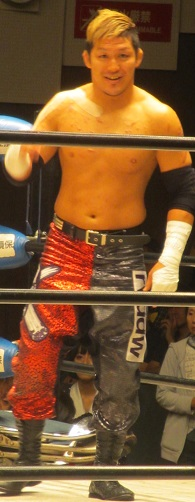
Takeda in September 2015

Takeda debuted in BJW on May 23, 2008, teaming with Kankuro Hoshino in a loss to Craig Classic and Masada. In October of that year, he competed in his first ever deathmatch, teaming with Shuji Ishikawa and Ryuji Ito in a loss to Saboru Inematsu, Jaki Numazawa and mentor Jun Kasai. In early 2009, Takeda teamed with Isami Kodaka in the Maximum Tag League, winning his first deathmatch on March 26, when he and Kodaka defeated Numazawa and Kasai. The two finished first in their block with 6 points, allowing them to advance to the semi-finals where they defeated Block A runners-up Ryuji Ito and Shuji Ishikawa. In the final, Takeda and Kodaka wrestled Takashi Sasaki and Yuko Miyamoto to a draw in a Fluorescent Lighttubes Tower Of Death Match, but defeated them in overtime to become the new BJW Tag Team Champions. Takeda and Kodaka held the championships until July, dropping them to Daisuke Sekimoto and Yuji Okabayashi in their first defence. That same month, Takeda won the D-Dash Tournament, defeating Shinya Ishikawa in the final, and unsuccessfully challenged Yuko Miyamoto for the BJW Deathmatch Heavyweight Championship in a scaffold deathmatch. In December, Takeda teamed with Takuma Obe in the D-Dash Tag Tournament, making it to the semi-finals before being eliminated by Ryuichi Kawakami and Shinya Ishikawa. Takeda again challenged for the Deathmatch Heavyweight Championship in July 2010, this time losing to Ryuji Ito in a glass and fluorescent light tubes alpha deathmatch.

In early 2011, Takeda participated in the Ikkitosen Death Survival Tournament, finishing first in his block with 6 points, but losing to Takashi Sasaki in the final. Takeda received his third opportunity at the BJW Deathmatch Heavyweight Championship in February 2012, losing to Abdullah Kobayashi in an Open Finger Gloves Spike Nail Deathmatch. Takeda made his debut outside of Japan in June 2013, losing to Combat Zone Wrestling (CZW)'s Drake Younger in a deathmatch in Germany. Takeda unsuccessfully challenged for the BJW Deathmatch Heavyweight Championship for the fourth time on June 30, losing to Shuji Ishikawa. In February 2014, while riding his motorcycle, Takeda was involved in an accident, injuring his ankle and missing 4 months of action. He wrestled his return match on June 14, losing to Danny Havoc in the first round of the 2014 Tournament Of Death for CZW in the United States. Takeda received his 5th opportunity at the Deathmatch Heavyweight Championship in August, losing to Yuko Miyamoto. In early 2015, Takeda again participated in the Ikkitosen Survival Tournament, finishing first in his block with 8 points but losing to Abdullah Kobayashi in the final. On August 19, 2017, Takeda defeated Masaya Takahashi to win the BJW Deathmatch Heavyweight Championship for the first time in his career.

=== All Japan Pro Wrestling (2016–present) ===
Beginning in May 2016, Takeda began making appearances for All Japan Pro Wrestling (AJPW). On May 25, Takeda unsuccessfully challenged Atsushi Aoki for the World Junior Heavyweight Championship. In August, Takeda gained his biggest win in All Japan to date when he teamed with Nextream (Jake Lee and Kento Miyahara) to defeat Evolution (Suwama and Aoki) and Super Tiger. On October 15, Takeda and Atsushi Maruyama unsuccessfully challenged Evolution (Aoki and Hikaru Sato) for the All Asia Tag Team Championship.

== Personal life ==
Takeda is a birdkeeper in his spare time; he owns a pet barn owl named 12, and runs a Twitter account where he posts pictures and updates of the owl.

He married his wife, Yuka Omori, a former member of the idol group "Through Skills" in June 2019. Together, the couple had a daughter. Takeda announced on January 30, 2022, that his wife had died suddenly on January 7, and her funeral had been held on January 14. He also announced that he would be taking a break from professional wrestling as a result. He eventually returned to the ring in July 2022.

== Mixed martial arts record ==
Masashi Takeda
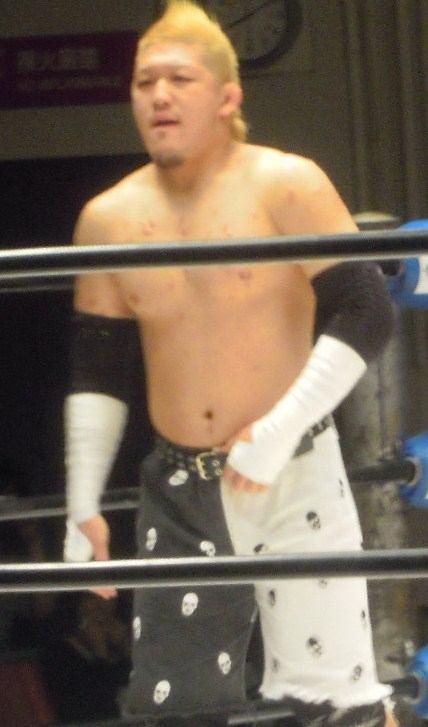
- Other names: Crazy Kid
- Nationality: Japanese
- Height: 1.73 m (5 ft 8 in)
- Weight: 87 kg (192 lb)
- Division: Welterweight
- Team: U-File
- Years active: 2005–present

Mixed martial arts record
- Total: 16
- Wins: 11
- By knockout: 6
- By submission: 5
- By decision: 0
- Losses: 4
- By knockout: 3
- By submission: 1
- By decision: 0
- Draws: 1

Other information
- Mixed martial arts record from Sherdog

Professional record breakdown
16 matches	11 wins	4 losses
By knockout	6	3
By submission	5	1
By decision	0	0
Draws	1	

== Championships and accomplishments ==
- All Japan Pro Wrestling
  - Jr. Tag Battle of Glory (2017) – with Atsushi Maruyama
- Big Japan Pro Wrestling
  - BJW Deathmatch Heavyweight Championship (1 time)
  - BJW Tag Team Championship (3 times) – with Isami Kodaka (1) and Takumi Tsukamoto (2)
  - Saikyo Tag League (2009) – with Isami Kodaka
  - Soushi Sousatsu Deathmatch Tag Tournament (2023) – with Takumi Tsukamoto
- Dotonbori Pro Wrestling
  - WDW Tag Team Championship (1 time) – with Jaki Numazawa
- Desastre Total Ultraviolento
  - DTU World Extreme Championship (1 time)
- Game Changer Wrestling
  - GCW Ultraviolent Championship (1 time)
  - Nick Gage Invitational 3 (2018)
  - Tournament of Survival (2026)
- Guts World Pro Wrestling
  - GWC 6-Man Tag Team Championship (3 times) – with Masato Shibata and Kotaro Nasu (1), Daisuke and Kankuro Hoshino (1) and Daisuke and Bungee Takada (1)
- Japan Indie Awards
  - Best Bout Award (2017) vs. Masaya Takahashi on December 17
- Pro Wrestling A-Team
  - WEW Tag Team Championship (1 time) – with Tomohiko Hashimoto
- Pro Wrestling Freedoms
  - King of Freedom World Championship (3 times)
  - King of Freedom World Tag Team Championship (2 times) – with Jun Kasai (1) and Yusaku Ito (1)
  - Barefoot King Championship (1 time)
  - Jun Kasai Deathmatch Tournament (2013)
- Pro Wrestling Illustrated
  - Ranked No. 339 of the top singles wrestlers in the PWI 500 in 2026
- Pro Wrestling Zero1
  - NWA Intercontinental Tag Team Championship (1 time) – with Yuko Miyamoto
- Strong Style Pro-Wrestling
  - SSPW Tag Team Championship (1 time, current) – with Super Tiger
- Style-E
  - Style-E Openweight Championship (1 time)
