= So Daimonji =

Japanese professional wrestler

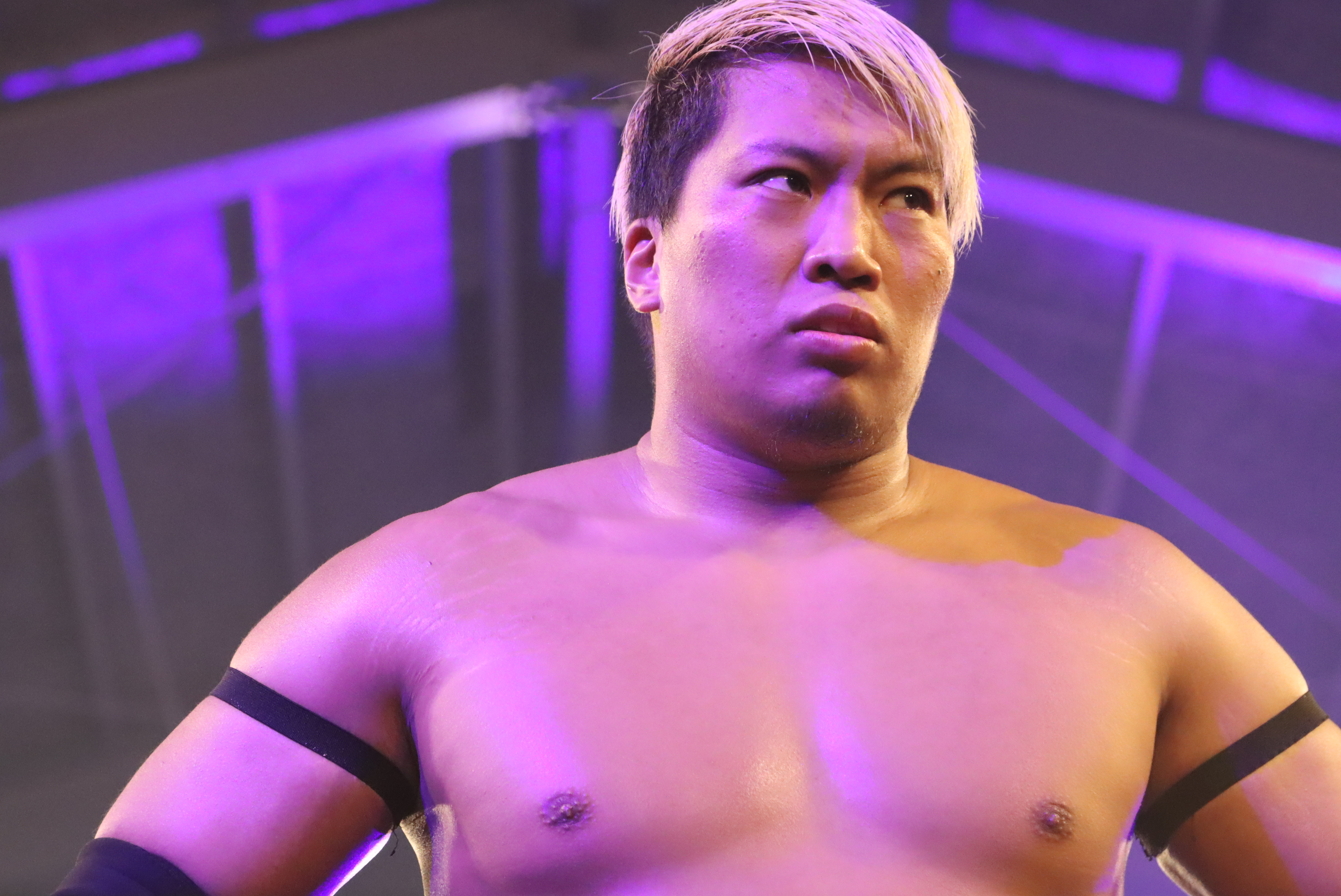
- Daimonji in February 2022

Personal information
- Born: 9 March 1993 (age 33) Hakodate, Japan

Professional wrestling career
- Ring name: So Daimonji So Shibata Takashi Daimonji
- Billed height: 185 cm (6 ft 1 in)
- Billed weight: 110 kg (243 lb)
- Trained by: Ryouji Sai; Pablo Márquez
- Debut: 2016

Takashi Shibata (柴田 崇, Shibata Takashi), better known by his ring name So Daimonji (大文字宗, Daimonji Sō), is a Japanese professional wrestler. Daimonji has wrestled for a number of wrestling promotions in Japan, including All Japan Pro Wrestling (AJPW), Pro Wrestling Land's End, Gleat and Colega Pro Wrestling.

== Professional wrestling career ==
=== Japanese independent circuit (2016–present) ===
Shibata has worked for various Japanese promotions as an independent wrestler. On January 10, 2020 he made an appearance at the third night of the All Japan Pro Wrestling event AJPW New Year Wars, where he teamed up with Ryoji Sai to unsuccessfully challenge Jin (Jake Lee and Koji Iwamoto) for the All Asia Tag Team Championship. At AJPW Prime Night on December 13, 2020, he teamed up with Ryoji Sai and Revlon against Menso-re Oyaji, Carbell Ito and Takao Omori in an unsuccessful attempt to win the inaugural AJPW TV Six-Man Tag Team Championship.

=== Big Japan Pro Wrestling (2021–present) ===
Shibata made his Big Japan Pro Wrestling debut at BJW Osaka Surprise 52 ~ Proud Ruler on July 4, 2021 where he teamed up with Daichi Hashimoto and Kazumi Kikuta to defeat Kosuke Sato, Shigehiro Irie and Yuji Okabayashi. During his tenure with the promotion, he joined the "Project Havoc" stable and took part in multiple title chases.

At BJW in Kagoshima on December 17, 2023, he teamed up with Project Havoc stablemates Leyton Buzzard and Tempesta to unsuccessfully challenge Kazumi Kikuta, Yasufumi Nakanoue and Yuya Aoki for the Yokohama Shopping Street 6-Man Tag Team Championship. Two nights later at BJW in Hiroshima on December 19, 2023, he again joined Buzzard and Tempesta, this time unsuccessfully challenging Kazuki Hashimoto and Okami (Daichi Hashimoto and Hideyoshi Kamitani) for the Tenryu Project WAR World 6-Man Tag Team Championship. At a house show on May 5, 2025, Shibata teamed up with Daisuke Sekimoto as "W-Daichan" and defeated Dale Patricks and Mad Man Pondo to win the BJW Tag Team Championship. This was the first BJW-sanctioned title ever won by Shibata.

Shibata has competed in several of the promotion's signature events. He made his first appearance at the 2025 Ikkitousen Strong Climb, where he placed himself in the A Block.

=== Gleat (2024–present) ===
Shibata made his debut in GLEAT at GLEAT Ver. 8 on January 21, 2024, where he teamed up with Ryuichi Kawakami to unsuccessfully challenge the Saito Brothers (Jun Saito and Rei Saito) for the G-Infinity Championship. During his tenure with Gleat, Shibata was part of the "Black Generation International" stable. He competed for the first time as a member of the stable at GLEAT Premium House Show In Korakuen Hall on August 21, 2024, where he teamed up with stablemates Hartley Jackson, Keiichi Sato and Kotaro Suzuki to defeat Ender Kara, JD Lee, Junjie and Takehiro Yamamura.

== Championships and accomplishments ==
- Big Japan Pro Wrestling
  - BJW World Strong Heavyweight Championship (1 time)
  - BJW Tag Team Championship (1 time) – with Daisuke Sekimoto
  - Yokohama Shopping Street 6-Man Tag Team Championship (1 time, current) – with Daichi Hashimoto and Joji Otani
- Gleat
  - G-Infinity Championship (1 time, current) – with Soma Watanabe
- Niigata Pro Wrestling
  - Niigata Heavyweight Championship (1 time)
- Pro Wrestling Land's End
  - All Asia Heavyweight Championship (1 time)
- Pro Wrestling Illustrated
  - Ranked No. 255 of the top singles wrestlers in the PWI 500 in 2026
