= Masato Inaba =

Japanese professional wrestler

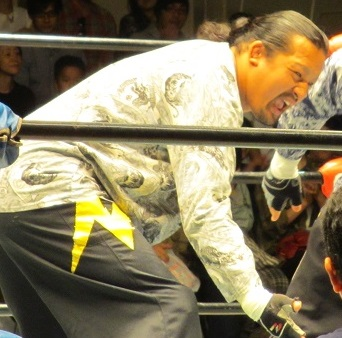
- Inaba in September 2014

Personal information
- Born: November 13, 1982 (age 43) Kawasaki, Japan

Professional wrestling career
- Ring name(s): Captain Abnormal; Masked Genbei; Seyton Inaba; Masato Inaba; Gosamaru; Maybach #2
- Billed height: 178 cm (5 ft 10 in)
- Billed weight: 98 kg (216 lb)
- Debut: 2007

Masato Inaba (稲葉雅人, Inaba Masato) is a Japanese professional wrestler currently working as a freelancer and is best known for his time in the Japanese promotion Big Japan Pro Wrestling.

== Professional wrestling career ==
=== Independent circuit (2007-present) ===
Inaba made his professional wrestling debut at El Dorado I Was Born To Love Treasure, an event promoted by Pro Wrestling El Dorado on December 19, 2007 where he teamed up with in a losing effort to Tokyo Gurentai (Masada and Nosawa Rongai).

As a freelancer he is known for working with various promotions. At ZERO1 Dream Series Midsummer Shinkiba Battle, an event promoted by Pro Wrestling Zero1 on August 17, 2017, he teamed up with Super Tiger in a losing effort to Daiki Inaba and Yusaku Obata. On the fifteenth night of the Dragon Gate's Gate Of Adventure 2018 from September 2, he teamed up with Hibiscus Mii, Shachihoko Boy and Shuri Joe in a losing effort to Churaumi Saver, Fuuta Shimadou, Gamma and Gurukun Mask. At AJPW Summer Action Series II 2020, an event promoted by All Japan Pro Wrestling on August 15, he teamed up with Kagetora in a losing effort to Hikaru Sato and Takuya Wada.

==== Big Japan Pro Wrestling (2010-2016) ====
At BJW/DDT/K-DOJO Tenka Touitsu! ~ New Year's Eve Pro-Wrestling, a cross-over event promoted by BJW in partnership with DDT Pro Wrestling and Kaientai Dojo on December 31, 2013, Inaba competed in an 18-man battle royal also involving Ricky Fuji, Michael Nakazawa, Tsutomu Oosugi, Soma Takao, Hiroshi Fukuda and others. At BJW/CZW CZW Arena In Japan, a cross-over event promoted by BJW in partnership with Combat Zone Wrestling on January 5, 2014, Inaba teamed up with his "Heisei Gokudo Combi" tag partner Kankuro Hoshino in a losing effort to Dave Crist and Shinobu.

Inaba is known for competing in the promotion's signature events. One of them is the Saikyo Tag League, making his first appearance in the 2013 edition of the event where he teamed up with Kankuro Hoshino, placing themselves in the Block A and scoring a total of zero points after going against the teams of Daisuke Sekimoto and Yuji Okabayashi, Masashi Takeda and Takumi Tsukamoto, Jun Kasai and Jaki Numazawa, Kazuki Hashimoto and Yusaku Obata, and Ryuichi Kawakami and Axeman. One year later at the 2014 edition, Inaba teamed up again with Hoshino, this time placing in the Deathmatch Block and scoring a total of six points after competing against Ryuji Ito and Abdullah Kobayashi, Yuko Miyamoto and Isami Kodaka, Saburo Inematsu and Ryuichi Sekine and Brahman Shu and Brahman Kei.

As for the Ikkitousen Strong Climb branch of events, he made his only appearance at the 2014 edition placing himself in the Block B and scoring a total of two points after competing against Manabu Soya, Shinobu, Kazuki Hashimoto and others. Another event in which he participated is the Ikkitousen Deathmatch Survivor, and at the 2015 edition he competed in the Block B against Isami Kodaka, Takumi Tsukamoto, Saburo Inematsu and Takayuki Ueki scoring a total of six points.

Inaba also participated in sporadic tournaments of the promotion such as the Strong Style Rising Tournament where he fell short to Amigo Suzuki in a first-round match from May 24, 2013.

==== New Japan Pro Wrestling (2010-2020) ====
Inaba competed in several matches for New Japan Pro Wrestling in a span of a decade. At NJPW Exciting Battle In Okinawa on January 22, he teamed up with Jushin Thunder Liger, Kaijin Habu Otoko and Super Delfin to pick up a victory over Menso-re Oyaji, Mil Mongoose, Ryusuke Taguchi and Shisaou in an eight-man tag team match. His last appearance was at NJPW New Japan Road 2020 on February 26 where he teamed up with Hija Kidman in a losing effort to Ultra Soki and Gurukun Mask.

==== Pro Wrestling Noah (2015) ====
Inaba participated in the 2015 edition of Pro Wrestling Noah's Global Tag League where he teamed up with Maybach Taniguchi as "Maybach #2", placing themselves in the Block A and scoring a total of two points after competing against the teams of Masato Tanaka and Takashi Sugiura, Mikey Nicholls and Shane Haste, Minoru Suzuki and Takashi Iizuka, Katsuhiko Nakajima and Naomichi Marufuji, and Daisuke Sekimoto and Kazuki Hashimoto.

== Championships and accomplishments ==
- Big Japan Pro Wrestling
  - Yokohama Shopping Street 6-Man Tag Team Championship (1 time) – with Kankuro Hoshino and Great Kojika
- Okinawa Pro Wrestling
  - MWF World Tag Team Championship (1 time) – with Mil Mongoose
    - MWF World Tag Team Title Tournament (2009) – with Mil Mongoose
- Ryukyu Dragon Pro Wrestling
  - Gasakae Tournament (2019)
