= Yuki Ishikawa (wrestler, born 1995) =

Japanese professional wrestler

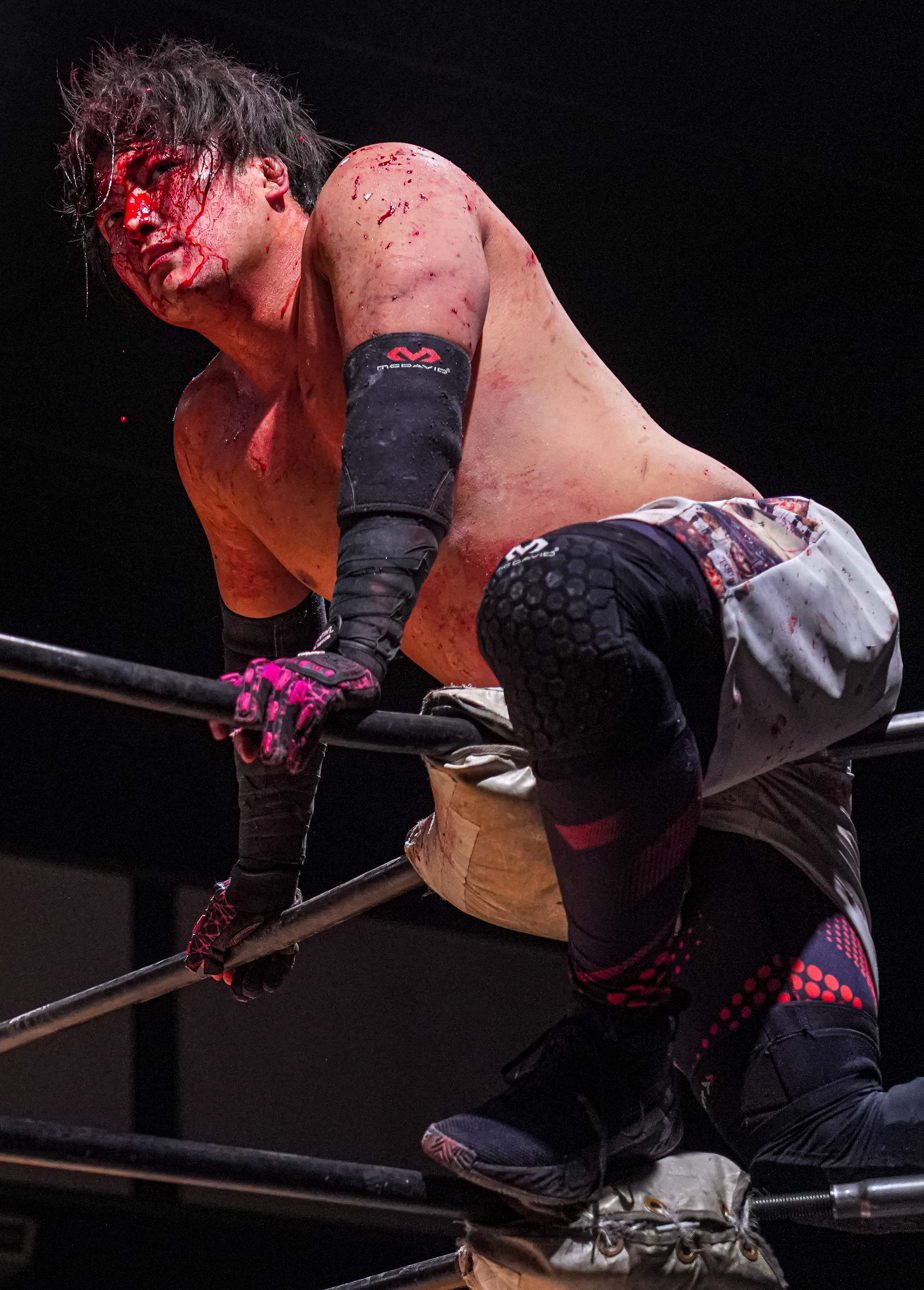
- Ishikawa in February 2020

Personal information
- Born: November 9, 1995 (age 30) Hakodate, Japan

Professional wrestling career
- Ring name: Yuki Ishikawa
- Billed height: 170 cm (5 ft 7 in)
- Billed weight: 85 kg (187 lb)
- Trained by: BJW Dojo
- Debut: 2018
- Retired: 2024

Yuki Ishikawa (石川勇希, Ishikawa Yūki) is a Japanese retired professional wrestler best known for his tenure with the Japanese promotion Big Japan Pro Wrestling where he is a two-time BJW Deathmatch Heavyweight Champion and a one-time Yokohama Shopping Street 6-Man Tag Team Champion.

== Professional wrestling career ==
=== Independent circuit (2018–2024) ===
Ishikawa also checked freelance work, competing for various promotions from the Japanese independent scene. He did most of his external work as a BJW talent. At BJW/2AW Big Advance, a cross-over event produced with Active Advance Pro Wrestling on May 15, 2021, Ishikawa teamed up with Ayato Yoshida and Kosuke Sato in a losing effort against Strong BJ (Daisuke Sekimoto and Yuji Okabayashi) and Kengo Mashimo. At ZERO1 Osu Premium One Team ZERO1 Shinjiro Otani Aid!, a cross-over event produced with Pro Wrestling Zero1 on June 4, 2022, he teamed up with Fuminori Abe and Kosuke Sato in a losing effort against Astroman, Ren Ayabe and Yuko Miyamoto. At 666 Vol. 118, an event produced by Wrestling of Darkness 666 on August 11, 2022, Ishikawa teamed up with Yuko Miyamoto in a losing effort against Fuminori Abe and Ikuto Hidaka. At BJW/DDT Toshikoshi Pro-Wrestling 2022 ~ Toshiwasure! Shuffle Six Man Tag Team Tournament, a cross-over event produced with DDT Pro-Wrestling on December 31, 2022, Ishikawa teamed up with Harashima and Masashi Takeda and defeated Masato Tanaka, Takeshi Masada and Takuya Nomura in the first rounds but fell short to Daichi Hashimoto, Yuki Ueno and Yuma Aoyagi in the semifinals, with both bouts taking place the same night.

=== Big Japan Pro Wrestling (2018–2024) ===
A homegrown talent, Ishikawa made his professional wrestling debut in Big Japan Pro Wrestling on the third night of the BJW Ueno Winter Festival from February 3, 2018, where he wrestled Akira Hyodo into a time-limit draw in an exhibition match. Ishikawa competed for various championships promoted by the company. At BJW Osaka Surprise 42 ~ Strong World on July 21, 2019, he teamed up with Speed Of Sounds (Banana Senga and Tsutomu Oosugi) to unsuccessfully challenge Sento Minzoku (Daiki Shimomura, Isami Kodaka and Ryuichi Sekine) for the vacant UWA World Trios Championship. At a house show from June 29, 2023, Kikuta teamed up with Hideyoshi Kamitani and Kazumi Kikuta to defeat Abdullah Kobayashi, Daiju Wakamatsu and Kankuro Hoshino for the Yokohama Shopping Street 6-Man Tag Team Championship. At a house show from July 16, 2023, he defeated Abdullah Kobayashi to capture the BJW Deathmatch Heavyweight Championship.

During his tenure with the company, he competed in various of its signature events. One of them is the Ikkitousen Strong Climb, in which he made his debut at the 2021 edition, where he placed himself in the D block, scoring a total of two points after competing against Hideyoshi Kamitani, Akira Hyodo and Isami Kodaka. As for the Saikyo Tag League, Kikuta made his first appearance at the 2019 edition where he teamed up with Toshiyuki Sakuda placing themselves in the Deathmatch Block, scoring a total fo four points after competing against the teams of Masashi Takeda and Takumi Tsukamoto, Rickey Shane Page and Ryuji Ito, Abdullah Kobayashi and Kankuro Hoshino, Isami Kodaka and Yuko Miyamoto, Drew Parker and Orca Uto, and 3rd Generation Chimidoro Brothers (Masaya Takahashi and Takayuki Ueki). In the Ikkitousen Deathmatch Survivor, Ishikawa made his first appearance at the 2021 edition where he placed himself in the D Block, scoring a total of two points after competing against Hideyoshi Kamitani, Akira Hyodo and Isami Kodaka.

=== All Japan Pro Wrestling (2019) ===
Ishikawa shared a brief tenure with All Japan Pro Wrestling as developmental talent sent by BJW. He made his first appearance on the thirteenth night of the AJPW Summer Explosion Series 2019 from September 3, where he teamed up with Akira Hyodo, Takuho Kato in a losing effort against Atsuki Aoyagi, Dan Tamura and Yusuke Okada. He made his last appearance at AJPW GROWIN' UP Vol.21 on September 11, 2019, where he teamed up again with Hyodo and Kato to defeat Atsuki Aoyagi, Dan Tamura and Hokuto Omori.

=== Retirement (2024) ===
Ishikawa retired from professional wrestling on August 12, 2024 due to a shoulder injury.

== Championships and accomplishments ==
- Big Japan Pro Wrestling
  - BJW Deathmatch Heavyweight Championship (2 times)
  - Yokohama Shopping Street 6-Man Tag Team Championship (1 time) – with Hideyoshi Kamitani and Kazumi Kikuta
