= Joji Otani =

Japanese wrestler (born 1991)

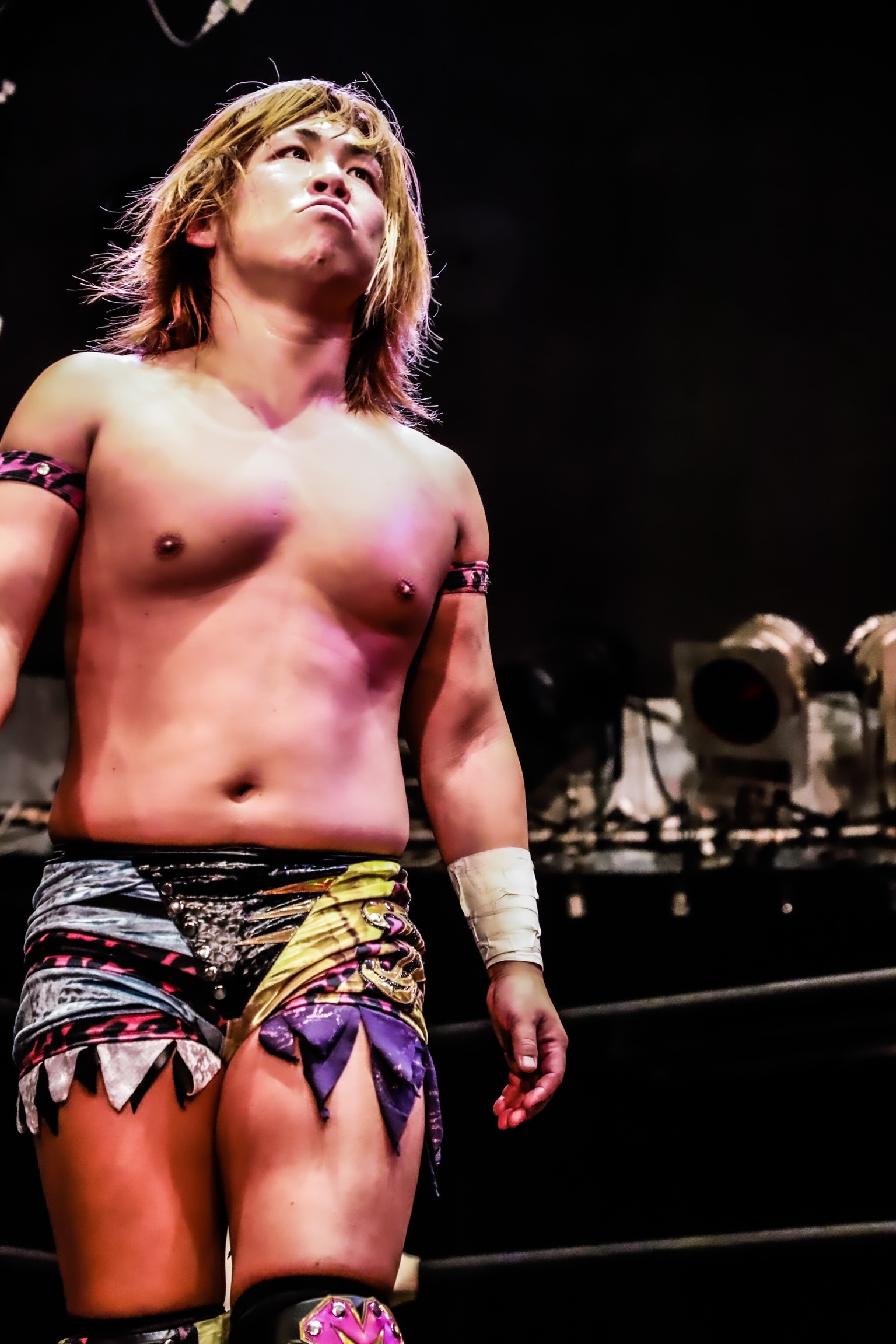
- Otani in November 2022

Personal information
- Born: 4 June 1991 (age 35) Machida, Japan
- Education: Izumi Junior College

Professional wrestling career
- Ring name: Gyaru-o Collection AG Joji Tanaka Joji Otani
- Billed height: 168 cm (5 ft 6 in)
- Billed weight: 80 kg (176 lb)
- Trained by: Guts Ishijima; Mr. Gannosuke
- Debut: 2014

Joji Otani (大谷譲二, Ōtani Jōji) is a Japanese professional wrestler best known for his tenure with the Big Japan Pro Wrestling (BJW) where he is a one-time Yokohama Shopping Street 6-Man Tag Team Champion. He also shared tenures with P.P.P. Tokyo and Pro Wrestling A-Team.

== Professional wrestling career ==
=== Japanese independent circuit (2015–present) ===
While attending the Izumi Junior College, Otani began practicing wrestling under the ring name of "Gyaru-o Collection AG" in the Kanto Student Wrestling Federation under the Universal Wrestling Federation in late 2014 with the guidance of Guts Ishijima and Mr. Gannosuke.

Otani made his professional wrestling debut at VKF Monday Night Brawl, an event promoted by VKF Pro Wrestling on December 14, 2014, where he teamed up with Shota in a losing effort against Tank Nagai and Yasu Kubota. He shared tenures with various promotions from the Japanese independent scene such as Guts World Prowrestling (GWP), Colega Pro Wrestling (CPW), Pro Wrestling Heat Up and others.

Otani regularly competed in Guts World Prowrestling between 2015 and the promotion's closure from April 15, 2018.

On April 20, 2018, he joined Pro Wrestling Heat Up, mainly activating the promotion's sub-brand of "Pro Wrestling Going-Up". On February 24, 2019, Going-Up disbanded, so he moved back to the promotion's main shows. On May 19, he won the Heat Up Universal Tag Team Championship alongside Daisuke Kanehira by defeating Kazuhiro Tamura and Tatsumi Fujinami. On December 2, the tag team championship became vacant due to the group's suspension of activities.

On October 31, 2020, Otani left Heat Up while still on hiatus. In December of the same year, he announced that he would be returning to the group at the P.P.P. Tokyo's house show scheduled for January 2021.

He made his return on January 27, 2021, in a match against Masayuki Mitomi at the P.P.P. Shinkiba 1stRING event.

=== Big Japan Pro Wrestling (2023–present) ===
Otani made his debut in Big Japan Pro Wrestling at BJW Osaka Surprise 65 on April 2, 2023, where he teamed up with Daichi Hashimoto in a losing effort against Kazuki Hashimoto and Koju Takeda.

During his time with the promotion, he chased for various accomplishments. At a house show promoted on December 30, 2025, Otani competed in a battle royal disputed for the BJW Junior Heavyweight Championship, in which reigning champion Kosuke Sato retained the title over Otani, Kaji Tomato, Masaki Morihiro, Takato Nakano and Tatsuhiko Yoshino. At BJW Osaka Surprise 73 on June 23, 2023, he teamed up with Shota Nakagawa to unsuccessfully challenge Kaji Tomato and Kota Sekifuda for the UWA World Tag Team Championship. At BJW Death Market 91 on July 26, 2026, Otani teamed up with So Daimonji and Daichi Hashimoto as "Yosomono" to defeat Kengo Takai, Kenta Kosugi and Mari Manji for the Yokohama Shopping Street 6-Man Tag Team Championship.

== Championships and accomplishments ==
- Batos Cafe Entertainment
  - Wrestle Brain Cup Championship (1 time)
- Big Japan Pro Wrestling
  - Yokohama Shopping Street 6-Man Tag Team Championship (1 time, current) – with Daichi Hashimoto and So Daimonji
- Daiwa Entertainment Pro Wrestling
  - DEP Tag Team Championship (1 time) – with Shinya Ishida
- Mobius
  - Apex Of Triangle Championship (1 time, current) – with Masao Orihara and Hashinosuke
- Pro Wrestling A-Team
  - WEW World Tag Team Championship (1 time) – with Raiden
  - WEW Junior Heavyweight Championship (1 time)
- Pro Wrestling Heat Up
  - Heat Up Universal Tag Team Championship (2 times) – with Daisuke Kanehira (1) and Akira Jo (1)
- Pro Wrestling Magic Box
  - MBPW Openweight Championship (1 time)
- P.P.P. Tokyo
  - P.P.P. Emperor Of Party The Moment Championship (1 time, current)
