= Takuho Kato =

Japanese professional wrestler

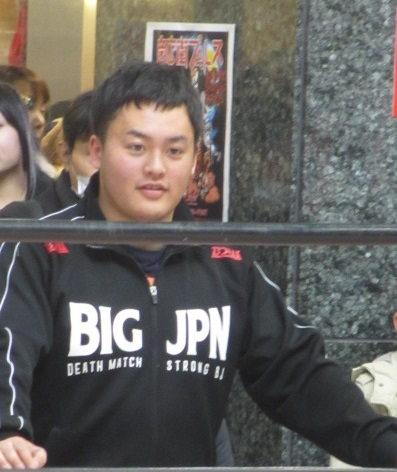
- Kato in February 2018

Personal information
- Born: 2 January 1998 (age 28) Sapporo, Japan

Professional wrestling career
- Ring name: Takuho Kato
- Billed height: 173 cm (5 ft 8 in)
- Billed weight: 95 kg (209 lb)
- Debut: 2018
- Retired: 2023

Takuho Kato (加藤拓歩, Katō Takuho) is a former Japanese professional wrestler. He is best known for his five-year tenure with the Japanese promotion Big Japan Pro Wrestling, where he is a former Yokohama Shopping Street 6-Man Tag Team Champion.

== Professional wrestling career ==
=== Big Japan Pro Wrestling (2018–2023) ===
Kato made his professional wrestling debut in Big Japan Pro Wrestling at BJW New Year 2018 on January 2, where he teamed up with Takuya Nomura in a losing effort against Masaki Morihio and Yuya Aoki in a tag-team match.

In his five-year tenure with the promotion, Kato won one title, the Yokohama Shopping Street 6-Man Tag Team Championship. During a house show on October 3, 2019, Kato joined Daisuke Sekimoto and Akira Hyodo to defeat Abdullah Kobayashi, Kankuro Hoshino, and Yuko Miyamoto in a three-way match for the vacant title. Their reign lasted for 450 days with a total of five successful defenses. At a house show on September 8, 2019, Kato teamed up with Yuji Okabayashi to unsuccessfully challenge Daisuke Sekimoto and The Bodyguard for the BJW Tag Team Championship. At BJW Weekday Premium on October 1, 2021, Kato joined Hiroyuki Suzuki to unsuccessfully challenge the Astronauts (Fuminori Abe and Takuya Nomura) for the Iron Fist Tag Team Championship, a title owned by Pro-Wrestling Basara.

Kato competed in several of Big Japan Pro Wrestling's signature events. He appeared in the 2002 Ikkitousen Strong Climb hardcore tournament, where he competed in the A Block against Yasufumi Nakanoue, Hideyoshi Kamitani, Yuji Okabayashi, Takuya Nomura and Kota Sekifuda, scoring a total of two points. Kato also appeared in the 2019 edition of the Saikyo Tag League, where he teamed up with Akira Hyodo. Kato and Hyodo failed to score any points in the A Block after losing to the teams of Shigehiro Irie and Yuji Okabayashi, Okami (Daichi Hashimoto and Hideyoshi Kamitani), Kazumi Kikuta and Ryuichi Kawakami, Daisuke Sekimoto and The Bodyguard, Ryota Hama and Yasufumi Nakanoue, StrongHearts (El Lindaman and T-Hawk), and Astronauts (Fuminori Abe and Takuya Nomura). Kato's final appearance in the Saikyo Tag League came in 2022, when he teamed up with Hiroyuki Suzuki. In the A-Block, Kato and Suzuki competed against the Astronauts (Fuminori Abe and Takuya Nomura), Yasufumi Nakanoue and Andy Wu, Yankee Two Kenju (Isami Kodaka and Yuko Miyamoto), Kohei Sato and Kazumi Kikuta, Kota Sekifuda and Tomato Kaji, Masaya Takahashi and Hideyoshi Kamitani, Ryuji Ito and Jaki Numazawa, and Daisuke Sekimoto and Kazumasa Yoshida. The pair scored a total of ten points in the A-Block to qualify for the tournament semifinals. In the semifinals, Kato and Suzuki were knocked out of the tournament by Abdullah Kobayashi and Daiju Wakamatsu.

==== Kaientai Dojo (2018) ====
Due to Big Japan Pro Wrestling's business partnerships with various promotions from the Japanese independent circuit, Kato has often made external appearances as a developmental talent. In Kaientai Dojo, he competed in the 2018 edition of the K-Metal League and defeated Tatsuya Hanami, Marines Mask, Shinichiro Wakita and Kelly Sixx to reach the tournament finals, where he lost a rematch to Marines Mask.

==== All Japan Pro Wrestling (2019, 2022) ====
Kato also competed in multiple events promoted by All Japan Pro Wrestling. At AJPW Summer Explosion Series 2019 on September 3, he teamed up with Akira Hyodo and Yuki Ishikawa in a losing effort against Atsuki Aoyagi, Dan Tamura and Yusuke Okada. Kato briefly returned to the promotion three years later to compete at AJPW Excite Series 2022, where he teamed up with Kazumasa Yoshida in a losing effort against Dan Tamura and Ryuji Hijikata.

=== Retirement (2023) ===
On September 28, 2023, Kato announced his retirement from professional wrestling in a press conference held by Big Japan Pro Wrestling.

== Championships and accomplishments ==
- Big Japan Pro Wrestling
  - Yokohama Shopping Street 6-Man Tag Team Championship (1 time) – with Akira Hyodo and Daisuke Sekimoto
- Niigata Pro Wrestling
  - Wakashishi Kikusui Cup Championship (1 time)
