= Ikkitousen Strong Climb =

- Promotions: Big Japan Pro Wrestling
- First event: 2012
- Event gimmick: Round-robin tournament to determine the best wrestler of BJW's Strong BJ division

Ikkitousen Strong Climb is a professional wrestling round-robin hardcore tournament held by Big Japan Pro Wrestling (BJW) every two years to determine the best wrestler of BJW's Strong BJ division. The tournament was first held in 2014. The tournament differs from the Ikkitousen Deathmatch Survivor as it features matches of strong style format while the former tournament features deathmatch variations.

== List of winners ==
Year	Winner	Total won	Ref
2012	Yoshihito Sasaki	1	
2014	Shuji Ishikawa	1	
2016	Shuji Ishikawa	2	
2018	Hideki Suzuki	1	
2020	Daichi Hashimoto	1	
2022	Daisuke Sekimoto	1	
2025	Leyton Buzzard	1	

== 2012 ==
The 2012 Ikkitousen Strong Climb was held between February 26 and March 26, 2012.

Final standings
Block A		Block B	
Daisuke Sekimoto	10	Yoshihito Sasaki	10
Sami Callihan	8	Bad Bones	8
Yuji Okabayashi	6	Brahman Shu	6
Masashi Otani	2	Shinobu	4
Ryuichi Kawakami	2	Shinya Ishikawa	2
Takumi Tsukamoto	2	Kazuki Hashimoto	0

Block A	Callihan	Kawakami	Okabayashi	Otani	Sekimoto	Tsukamoto
Callihan	—N/a	Callihan (8:28)	Callihan (14:21)	Callihan (9:53)	Sekimoto (16:29)	Callihan (9:54)
Kawakami	Callihan (8:28)	—N/a	Okabayashi (12:44)	Otani (forfeit)	Sekimoto ((forfeit)	Kawakami (8:36)
Okabayashi	Callihan (14:21)	Okabayashi (12:44)	—N/a	Okabayashi (8:17)	Sekimoto (15:59)	Okabayashi (forfeit)
Otani	Callihan (9:53)	Otani (forfeit)	Okabayashi (8:17)	—N/a	Sekimoto (10:38)	Tsukamoto (7:13)
Sekimoto	Sekimoto (16:29)	Sekimoto ((forfeit)	Sekimoto (15:59)	Sekimoto (10:38)	—N/a	Sekimoto (9:54)
Tsukamoto	Callihan (9:54)	Kawakami (8:36)	Okabayashi (forfeit)	Tsukamoto (7:13)	Sekimoto (9:54)	—N/a
Block B	Bones	Brahman	Hashimoto	Ishikawa	Sasaki	Shinobu
Bones	—N/a	Bones (11:12)	Bones (9:33)	Bones (11:57)	Sasaki (10:18)	Bones (4:19)
Brahman	Bones (11:12)	—N/a	Brahman (7:54)	Ishikawa (13:43)	Brahman (9:49)	Brahman (13:12)
Hashimoto	Bones (9:33)	Brahman (7:54)	—N/a	Ishikawa (7:38)	Sasaki (9:41)	Shinobu (8:37)
Ishikawa	Bones (11:57)	Ishikawa (13:43)	Ishikawa (7:38)	—N/a	Sasaki (12:10)	Shinobu (10:57)
Sasaki	Sasaki (10:18)	Brahman (9:49)	Sasaki (9:41)	Sasaki (12:10)	—N/a	Sasaki (10:04)
Shinobu	Bones (4:19)	Brahman (13:12)	Shinobu (8:37)	Shinobu (10:57)	Sasaki (10:04)	—N/a

Semifinals
A1	Daisuke Sekimoto	Pin
B2	Bad Bones	11:12
B1	Yoshihito Sasaki	Pin
A2	Sami Callihan	15:10

Finals
A1	Daisuke Sekimoto	Pin
B1	Yoshihito Sasaki	15:29

== 2014 ==
The 2014 Ikkitousen Strong Climb was held between May 17 and July 26, 2014.

Final standings
Block A		Block B	
Shuji Ishikawa	10	Daisuke Sekimoto	8
Yuko Miyamoto	6	Manabu Soya	6
Shinya Ishikawa	6	Shinobu	6
Atsushi Maruyama	4	Kazuki Hashimoto	4
Shiori Asahi	4	Ryuichi Kawakami	4
Hideyoshi Kamitani	0	Masato Inaba	2

Block A	Asahi	Shinya	Shuji	Kamitani	Maruyama	Miyamoto
Asahi	—N/a	Shinya (11:29)	Shuji (12:57)	Asahi (8:37)	Maruyama (13:25)	Asahi (11:34)
Shinya	Shinya (11:29)	—N/a	Shuji (14:18)	Shinya (8:54)	Shinya (12:58)	Miyamoto (18:39)
Shuji	Shuji (12:57)	Shuji (14:18)	—N/a	Shuji (12:27)	Shuji (11:12)	Shuji (15:55)
Kamitani	Asahi (8:37)	Shinya (8:54)	Shuji (12:27)	—N/a	Maruyama (forfeit)	Miyamoto (forfeit)
Maruyama	Maruyama (13:25)	Shinya (12:58)	Shuji (12:27)	Maruyama (forfeit)	—N/a	Miyamoto (11:50)
Miyamoto	Asahi (11:34)	Miyamoto (18:39)	Shuji (15:55)	Miyamoto (forfeit)	Miyamoto (11:50)	—N/a
Block B	Hashimoto	Inaba	Kawakami	Sekimoto	Shinobu	Soya
Hashimoto	—N/a	Inaba (10:23)	Hashimoto (12:59)	Sekimoto (12:25)	Hashimoto (10:35)	Soya (10:43)
Inaba	Inaba (10:23)	—N/a	Kawakami (10:11)	Sekimoto (11:16)	Shinobu (10:41)	Soya (13:22)
Kawakami	Hashimoto (12:59)	Kawakami (10:11)	—N/a	Sekimoto (13:35)	Shinobu (14:56)	Kawakami (12:49)
Sekimoto	Sekimoto (12:25)	Sekimoto (11:16)	Sekimoto (13:35)	—N/a	Shinobu (19:11)	Sekimoto (14:03)
Shinobu	Hashimoto (10:35)	Sato (11:45)	Shinobu (10:41)	Shinobu (19:11)	—N/a	Soya (9:02)
Soya	Soya (10:43)	Soya (13:22)	Kawakami (12:49)	Sekimoto (14:03)	Soya (9:02)	—N/a

Semifinals
B1	Daisuke Sekimoto	Pin
A2	Yuko Miyamoto	13:36
A1	Shuji Ishikawa	Pin
B2	Manabu Soya	11:21

Finals
B1	Daisuke Sekimoto	Pin
A1	Shuji Ishikawa	13:11

== 2016 ==
The 2016 Ikkitousen Strong Climb was held between March 6 and April 10, 2016.

Final standings
Block A		Block B	
Daichi Hashimoto	6	Hideki Suzuki	8
Hideyoshi Kamitani	6	Shuji Ishikawa	8
Daisuke Sekimoto	6	Ryota Hama	6
Kohei Sato	4	Yuji Okabayashi	4
Seiya Sanada	4	Shinobu	2
Atsushi Maruyama	4	Yoshihisa Uto	2

Block A	Hashimoto	Kamitani	Maruyama	Sanada	Sato	Sekimoto
Hashimoto	—N/a	Hashimoto (14:31)	Maruyama (13:11)	Sanada (11:23)	Hashimoto (forfeit)	Hashimoto (20:20)
Kamitani	Hashimoto (14:31)	—N/a	Kamitani (13:28)	Sanada (13:16)	Kamitani (15:18)	Kamitani (21:37)
Maruyama	Maruyama (13:11)	Kamitani (13:28)	—N/a	Maruyama (13:55)	Sato (9:59)	Sekimoto (14:33)
Sanada	Sanada (11:23)	Sanada (13:16)	Maruyama (13:55)	—N/a	Sato (10:37)	Sekimoto (13:54)
Sato	Hashimoto (forfeit)	Kamitani (15:18)	Sato (9:59)	Sato (10:37)	—N/a	Sekimoto (forfeit)
Sekimoto	Hashimoto (20:20)	Kamitani (21:37)	Sekimoto (14:33)	Sekimoto (13:54)	Sekimoto (forfeit)	—N/a
Block B	Hama	Ishikawa	Okabayashi	Shinobu	Suzuki	Uto
Hama	—N/a	Ishikawa (8:15)	Hama (11:56)	Hama (6:50)	Suzuki (7:24)	Hama (4:43)
Ishikawa	Ishikawa (8:15)	—N/a	Ishikawa (15:08)	Ishikawa (14:15)	Suzuki (14:31)	Ishikawa (12:04)
Okabayashi	Hama (11:56)	Ishikawa (15:08)	—N/a	Okabayashi (16:14)	Suzuki (14:39)	Okabayashi (14:00)
Shinobu	Hama (6:50)	Ishikawa (14:15)	Okabayashi (16:14)	—N/a	Suzuki (9:55)	Shinobu (12:57)
Suzuki	Suzuki (7:24)	Suzuki (14:31)	Suzuki (14:39)	Suzuki (9:55)	—N/a	Uto (8:43)
Uto	Hama (4:43)	Ishikawa (12:04)	Okabayashi (14:00)	Shinobu (12:57)	Uto (8:43)	—N/a

Semifinals
A1	Daichi Hashimoto	Pin
B2	Shuji Ishikawa	8:09
A2	Hideyoshi Kamitani	CO
B1	Hideki Suzuki	7:12

Finals
B2	Shuji Ishikawa	Pin
A2	Hideyoshi Kamitani	22:54

== 2018 ==
The 2018 Ikkitousen Strong Climb was held between March 8 and April 15, 2018. The Block A winner Daichi Hashimoto defended his BJW World Strong Heavyweight Championship against Block B winner Hideki Suzuki in the final round of the tournament on April 15, in which Suzuki defeated Hashimoto to win the title and the tournament.

Final standings
Block A		Block B	
Daichi Hashimoto	8	Hideki Suzuki	8
Yasufumi Nakanoue	7	Daisuke Sekimoto	7
Ryota Hama	6	Ryuichi Kawakami	6
Hideyoshi Kamitani	5	Yoshihisa Uto	5
Takuya Nomura	2	Kazuki Hashimoto	2
Yuya Aoki	2	Kazumi Kikuta	2

Block A	Aoki	Hama	Daichi	Kamitani	Nakanoue	Nomura
Aoki	—N/a	Hama (7:34)	Daichi (13:22)	Kamitania (11:07)	Aoki (8:45)	Nomura (9:40)
Hama	Hama (7:34)	—N/a	Daichi (9:16)	Hama (9:43)	Nakanoue (10:46)	Hama (7:13)
Daichi	Daichi (13:22)	Daichi (9:16)	—N/a	Daichi (16:33)	Nakanoue (16:10)	Daichi (15:07)
Kamitani	Kamitania (11:07)	Hama (9:43)	Daichi (16:33)	—N/a	Draw (20:00)	Kamitani (16:37)
Nakanoue	Aoki (8:45)	Nakanoue (10:46)	Nakanoue (16:10)	Draw (20:00)	—N/a	Nakanoue (9:18)
Nomura	Nomura (9:40)	Hama (7:13)	Daichi (15:07)	Kamitani (16:37)	Nakanoue (9:18)	—N/a
Block B	Kazuki	Kawakami	Kikuta	Sekimoto	Suzuki	Uto
Kazuki	—N/a	Kawakami (10:41)	Kazuki (10:02)	Sekimoto (10:42)	Suzuki (3:39)	Uto (10:07)
Kawakami	Kawakami (10:41)	—N/a	Kawakami (8:24)	Kawakami (16:43)	Suzuki (10:14)	Uto (13:03)
Kikuta	Kzauki (10:02)	Kawakami (8:24)	—N/a	Sekimoto (10:37)	Suzuki (6:54)	Kikuta (7:42)
Sekimoto	Sekimoto (10:42)	Kawakami (16:43)	Sekimoto (10:37)	—N/a	Sekimoto (12:27)	Draw (20:00)
Suzuki	Suzuki (3:39)	Suzuki (10:14)	Suzuki (6:54)	Sekimoto (12:27)	—N/a	Suzuki (10:42)
Uto	Uto (10:07)	Uto (13:03)	Kikuta (7:42)	Draw (20:00)	Suzuki (10:42)	—N/a

Semifinals
B1	Hideki Suzuki	Pin
A2	Yasufumi Nakanoue	14:05
A1	Daichi Hashimoto	Pin
B2	Daisuke Sekimoto	15:13

Finals
B1	Hideki Suzuki	Pin
A1	Daichi Hashimoto	16:02

== 2020 ==
The 2020 Ikkitousen Strong Climb was held between March 3 and April 26, 2020. The Block A winner Daichi Hashimoto, also the BJW World Strong Heavyweight Champion, defeated Block C winner Quiet Storm in the final round of the tournament. Several events that were scheduled to showcase the tournament were cancelled due to the COVID-19 pandemic. The matches that were to take place on those events were scored as draws, with each wrestler earning one point.

Final standings
Block A		Block B		Block C		Block D	
Daichi Hashimoto	5	Daisuke Sekimoto	6	Quiet Storm	5	Jake Lee	6
Yoshiki Inamura	4	Kohei Sato	5	Yuji Hino	5	Kazumi Kikuta	5
Ryuichi Kawakami	4	Isami Kodaka	3	Ryota Hama	4	Yuya Aoki	3
T-Hawk	4	Taishi Takizawa	2	Yuji Okabayashi	4	Yasufumi Nakanoue	3
Akira Hyodo	3	Kazuki Hashimoto	2	Hideyoshi Kamitani	2	Takuya Nomura	3

Block A	Daichi	Hyodo	Inamura	Kawakami	T-Hawk
Daichi	—N/a	Draw (cancelled)	Daichi (14:51)	Kawakami (18:29)	Daichi (16:04)
Hyodo	Draw (cancelled)	—N/a	Inamura (8:09)	Hyodo (10:53)	T-Hawk (9:18)
Inamura	Daichi (14:51)	Inamura (8:09)	—N/a	Inamura (11:00)	T-Hawk (9:20)
Kawakami	Kawakami (18:29)	Hyodo (10:53)	Inamura (11:00)	—N/a	Kawakami (12:54)
T-Hawk	Daichi (16:04)	T-Hawk (9:18)	T-Hawk (9:20)	Kawakami (12:54)	—N/a
Block B	Kazuki	Kodaka	Sato	Sekimoto	Takizawa
Kazuki	—N/a	Draw (cancelled)	Draw (cancelled)	Sekimoto (11:45)	Takizawa (9:43)
Kodaka	Draw (cancelled)	—N/a	Sato (10:08)	Sekimoto (16:15)	Kodaka (11:04)
Sato	Draw (cancelled)	Sato (10:08)	—N/a	Sekimoto (13:50)	Sato (10:03)
Sekimoto	Sekimoto (11:45)	Sekimoto (16:15)	Sekimoto (13:50)	—N/a	Takizawa (13:50)
Takizawa	Takizawa (9:43)	Kodaka (11:04)	Sato (10:03)	Takizawa (13:50)	—N/a
Block C	Hama	Hino	Kamitani	Okabayashi	Storm
Hama	—N/a	Hino (7:06)	Draw (cancelled)	Hama (9:42)	Draw (cancelled)
Hino	Hino (7:06)	—N/a	Hino (14:30)	Draw (cancelled)	Storm (15:31)
Kamitani	Draw (cancelled)	Hino (14:30)	—N/a	Draw (cancelled)	Storm (9:07)
Okabayashi	Hama (9:42)	Draw (cancelled)	Draw (cancelled)	—N/a	Okabayashi (11:39)
Storm	Draw (cancelled)	Storm (15:31)	Storm (9:07)	Okabayashi (11:39)	—N/a
Block D	Aoki	Kikuta	Lee	Nakanoue	Nomura
Aoki	—N/a	Kikuta (9:41)	Lee (12:23)	Aoki (13:04)	Draw (cancelled)
Kikuta	Kikuta (9:41)	—N/a	Kikuta (9:41)	Draw (cancelled)	Nomura (10:21)
Lee	Lee (12:23)	Kikuta (9:41)	—N/a	Lee (13:10)	Lee (13:20)
Nakanoue	Aoki (13:04)	Draw (cancelled)	Lee (13:10)	—N/a	Nakanoue (11:18)
Nomura	Draw (cancelled)	Nomura (10:21)	Lee (13:20)	Nakanoue (11:18)	—N/a

Semifinals
A1	Daichi Hashimoto	Pin
B1	Daisuke Sekimoto	12:20
C1	Quiet Storm	CO
D1	Jake Lee	4:53

Finals
A1	Daichi Hashimoto	Pin
C1	Quiet Storm	17:24

== 2022 ==
The 2022 Ikkitousen Strong Climb was held between January 5 and February 20, 2022.

Final standings
Block A		Block B	
Yasufumi Nakanoue	6	Daisuke Sekimoto	10
Hideyoshi Kamitani	6	Kazumi Kikuta	8
Yuji Okabayashi	6	Daichi Hashimoto	6
Takuya Nomura	6	Yuya Aoki	4
Kota Sekifuda	4	Kazuki Hashimoto	2
Takuho Kato	2	Kosuke Sato	0

Block A	Kamitani	Kato	Nakanoue	Nomura	Okabayashi	Sekifuda
Kamitani	—N/a	Kato (15:27)	Nakanoue (13:03)	Kamitani (15:15)	Kamitani (17:39)	Kamitani (14:47)
Kato	Kato (15:27)	—N/a	Nakanoue (13:48)	Nomura (12:19)	Okabayashi (15:05)	Sekifuda (14:48)
Nakanoue	Nakanoue (13:03)	Nakanoue (13:48)	—N/a	Nomura (15:09)	Nakanoue (13:54)	Sekifuda (13:05)
Nomura	Kamitani (15:15)	Nomura (12:19)	Nomura (15:09)	—N/a	Okabayashi (17:08)	Nomura (13:17)
Okabayashi	Kamitani (17:39)	Okabayashi (15:05)	Nakanoue (13:54)	Okabayashi (17:08)	—N/a	Okabayashi (15:33)
Sekifuda	Kamitani (14:47)	Sekifuda (14:48)	Sekifuda (13:05)	Nomura (13:17)	Okabayashi (15:33)	—N/a
Block B	Aoki	D. Hashimoto	K. Hashimoto	Kikuta	Sato	Sekimoto
Aoki	—N/a	D. Hashimoto (16:58)	Aoki (12:02)	Kikuta (forfeit)	Aoki (13:33)	Sekimoto (2:37)
D. Hashimoto	D. Hashimoto (16:58)	—N/a	D. Hashimoto (12:34)	Kikuta (14:04)	D. Hashimoto (13:43)	Sekimoto (18:33)
K. Hashimoto	Aoki (12:02)	D. Hashimoto (12:34)	—N/a	Kikuta (11:30)	K. Hashimoto (12:34)	Sekimoto (11:34)
Kikuta	Kikuta (forfeit)	Kikuta (14:04)	Kikuta (11:30)	—N/a	Kikuta (13:40)	Sekimoto (11:53)
Sato	Aoki (13:33)	D. Hashimoto (13:43)	K. Hashimoto (12:34)	Kikuta (13:40)	—N/a	Sekimoto (11:53)
Sekimoto	Sekimoto (2:37)	Sekimoto (18:33)	Sekimoto (11:34)	Sekimoto (11:53)	Sekimoto (11:53)	—N/a

Final
A1	Yasufumi Nakanoue	Pin
B1	Daisuke Sekimoto	17:24

== 2025 ==
The 2025 Ikkitousen Strong Climb was held between May 15 and June 22, 2025.

Final standings
Block A		Block B	
So Daimonji	4	Leyton Buzzard	6
Hideyoshi Kamitani	4	Yasufumi Nakanoue	4
Yuya Aoki	2	Kazumi Kikuta	2
Kazumasa Yoshida	2	Koshiro Asakura	0

Block A	Aoki	Daimonji	Kamitani	Yoshida
Aoki	—N/a	Daimonji (12:17)	Kamitani (16:21)	Aoki (13:22)
Daimonji	Daimonji (12:17)	—N/a	Daimonji (10:36)	Yoshida (13:30)
Kamitani	Kamitani (16:21)	Daimonji (10:36)	—N/a	Kamitani (12:12)
Yoshida	Aoki (13:22)	Yoshida (13:30)	Kamitani (12:12)	—N/a
Block B	Asakura	Buzzard	Kikuta	Nakanoue
Asakura	—N/a	Buzzard (13:31)	Kikuta (11:08)	Nakanoue (10:05)
Buzzard	Buzzard (13:31)	—N/a	Buzzard (8:37)	Buzzard (10:39)
Kikuta	Kikuta (11:08)	Buzzard (8:37)	—N/a	Nakanoue (11:16)
Nakanoue	Nakanoue (10:05)	Buzzard (10:39)	Nakanoue (11:16)	—N/a

Final
A1	So Daimonji	21:26
B1	Leyton Buzzard	Pin

== See also ==
- Ikkitousen Deathmatch Survivor
- Saikyo Tag League
- List of Big Japan Pro Wrestling tournaments
