= Yoshihisa Uto =

Japanese professional wrestler

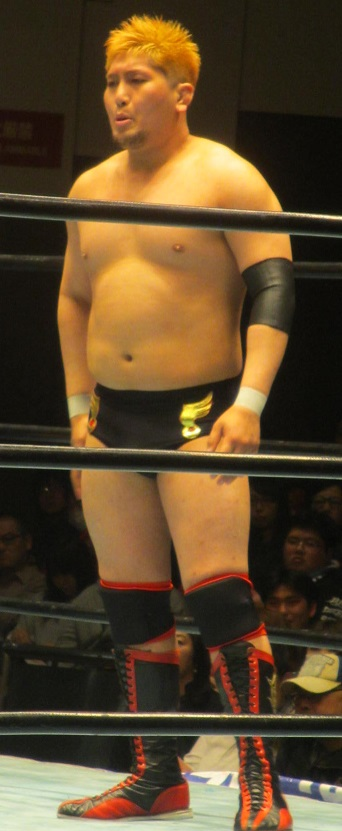
- Uto in March 2017

Personal information
- Born: May 12, 1988 (age 38) Aichi, Japan
- Spouse: Risa Sera (m. 2019; div. 2023)

Professional wrestling career
- Ring name(s): Orca Uto; Yoshihisa Uto; Battosai Shichiten
- Billed height: 183 cm (6 ft 0 in)
- Billed weight: 110 kg (243 lb)
- Trained by: Yuji Okabayashi; Hideki Suzuki
- Debut: 2012

Yoshihisa Uto (宇藤純久, Uto Yoshihisa) is a Japanese professional wrestler currently working as a freelancer and is best known for his time in the Japanese promotion Big Japan Pro Wrestling where he is a former Yokohama Shopping Street 6-Man Tag Team Champion.

== Professional wrestling career ==
=== Independent circuit (2012–present) ===
Due to his freelancing time, Uto is known for competing for various promotions from the Japanese independent scene. At FREEDOMS No Pain, No Gain 2022, an event promoted by Pro Wrestling Freedoms on February 10, 2022, he teamed up with ERE (Takayuki Ueki and Violento Jack) to defeat Kamui, Kenji Fukimoto and Mammoth Sasaki. Uto often competed in women's promotions. At Ice Ribbon Risa Sera's 5th Produced Show on October 24, 2020, he fought in an iron woman hardcore match disputed for Sera's FantastICE Championship which ended in a draw ans also involved notable opponents such as Akane Fujita, Hiragi Kurumi, Itsuki Aoki, Suzu Suzuki, and Takashi Sasaki. He also competed in various independent shows produced by the members of the Prominence stable such as Prominence Put Your Hand On The Flame from December 11, 2022, where he fought in a gauntlet match in which he, alongside Akane Fujita, Hiragi Kurumi, Miyako Matsumoto, Mochi Natsumi, Risa Sera, Super Hardcore Machine, Suzu Suzuki, Takayuki Ueki and Toshiyuki Sakuda defeated Fella Risa.

=== Big Japan Pro Wrestling (2015–2020) ===
Uto is best known for his work in Big Japan Pro Wrestling where he was part of the "Moon Vulcan" stable. He made his first appearance at BJW 20th Anniversary 0th Edition on February 22, 2015, where he fell short to Ryuichi Kawakami in an exhibition match.

Uto is known for competing in various of the promotion's signature events. In the Ikkitousen Strong Climb, he made his first appearance at the 2016 edition where he fought in the block B and scored a total of two points after competing against Hideki Suzuki, Shuji Ishikawa, Ryota Hama, Yuji Okabayashi and Shinobu. At the 2018 edition, he fought again in the block B, this time scoring five points after going against Hideki Suzuki, Daisuke Sekimoto, Ryuichi Kawakami, Kazuki Hashimoto and Kazumi Kikuta. In the Ikkitousen Deathmatch Survivor, Uto made his only appearance at the 2019 edition where he fought in the A block, failing to score any points after competing against Isami Kodaka, Abdullah Kobayashi, Jimmy Havoc, Ryuichi Sekine, Ryuji Ito, and Yuko Miyamoto.

In the Saikyo Tag League, Uto made his first appearance at the 2015 edition where he teamed up with Hideki Suzuki, placing themselves in the A block where they scored a total of two points after competing against the teams of Daisuke Sekimoto and Yuji Okabayashi, Shuji Ishikawa and Kohei Sato, Ryota Hama and Hideyoshi Kamitani, Speed of Sounds (Tsutomu Oosugi and Hercules Senga) and Daichi Hashimoto and Kazuki Hashimoto. At the 2016 edition he teamed up with Kazumi Kikuta and fought in the block B where they failed to score any points after going against the teams of Akebono and Ryota Hama, Hideyoshi Kamitani and Daichi Hashimoto, and Ryuichi Kawakami and Yasufumi Nakanoue. In 2017, he teamed up with Ryuichi Kawakami and fought in the block A where they scored a total of four points against Daisuke Sekimoto and Kohei Sato, Daichi Hashimoto and Hideyoshi Kamitani, Shingo Takagi and Yuji Okabayashi, Ryota Hama and Yasufumi Nakanoue, and Hideki Suzuki and Shogun Okamoto. In 2018, he teamed up with Abdullah Kobayashi in the block B where they scored eight points against the teams of Ryuji Ito and Ryuichi Sekine, Masaya Takahashi and Kyu Mogami, Masashi Takeda and Takumi Tsukamoto, Takayuki Ueki and Toshiyuki Sakuda, Yuko Miyamoto and Isami Kodaka, and Minoru Fujita and Kankuro Hoshino.

Due to BJW holding various business partnerships with different promotions, Uto worked in various cross-over events co-promoted alongside them. At BJW/DDT/K-DOJO Toshikoshi Pro-Wrestling 2015 from December 31, he teamed up with Kazusada Higuchi in a losing effort against Harashima and Yuko Miyamoto.

==== All Japan Pro Wrestling (2016–2017) ====
One of the related to BJW promotions in which Uto marked notable work is All Japan Pro Wrestling. At AJPW AJ Phoenix Vol.1 on February 15, 2016, he fell short to Zeus. On the second night of the AJPW Super Power Series 2016 from May 21, Uto teamed up with Toshiyuki Sakuda in a losing effort against Axe Bombers (Kazuhiro Tamura and Takao Omori). On the fifth night of the AJPW Summer Action Series 2017 from July 23, he teamed up with his Moon Vulcan stablemate Takuya Nomura in a losing effort against Evolution (Joe Doering and Suwama).

== Personal life ==
Uto married fellow professional wrestler Risa Sera in 2019. They divorced in 2023.

== Championships and accomplishments ==
- Big Japan Pro Wrestling
  - Yokohama Shopping Street 6-Man Tag Team Championship (9 times) – with Abdullah Kobayashi and Drew Parker (2), Abdullah Kobayashi and Hideki Suzuki (2), Ryota Hama and Yasufumi Nakanoue (5), Hideki Suzuki and Takuya Nomura
