= Kazumi Kikuta =

Japanese professional wrestler

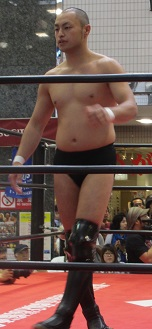
- Kikuta in June 2015

Personal information
- Born: March 1, 1986 (age 40) Hiranai, Japan

Professional wrestling career
- Ring name(s): Harbor Future Kaiser; Kazumi Kikuta
- Billed height: 180 cm (5 ft 11 in)
- Billed weight: 90 kg (198 lb)
- Debut: 2015

Kazumi Kikuta (菊田一美, Kikuta Kazumi) is a Japanese professional wrestler currently working for the promotion Big Japan Pro Wrestling where he is a former BJW Tag Team Champion and Yokohama Shopping Street 6-Man Tag Team Champion. He is also a former King of Freedom World Champion.

== Professional wrestling career ==
=== Independent circuit (2015–present) ===
Kikuta also checked freelance work, competing for various promotions from the Japanese independent scene. At BJW/2AW Big Advance, an event promoted by both BJW and Active Advance Pro Wrestling on March 5, 2022, Kikuta teamed up with Kazumasa Yoshida and Takuho Kato in a losing effort against Shu Asakawa, Taishi Takizawa and Takuro Niki. At BJW/DDT Toshikoshi Pro-Wrestling 2022, a co-promoted event between BJW and DDT Pro-Wrestling on December 31, 2022, Kikuta teamed up with Takuho Kato, Yuji Okabayashi and Kazumasa Yoshida in a losing effort against Cara Noir, Drew Parker, Konosuke Takeshita and Rickey Shane Page. Being a deathmatch wrestler, Kikuta competed at FREEDOMS Tono no Yabou, an event promoted by Pro Wrestling Freedoms on June 9, 2023, where he teamed up with Toru Sugiura in a losing effort against Abdullah Kobayashi and Takashi Sasaki.

=== Big Japan Pro Wrestling (2015–present) ===
Kikuta made his professional wrestling debut in Big Japan Pro Wrestling on the second night of the BJW Dai Nippon Haru No Pro-Wrestling ~ BJW YOU & 000 event from May 1, 2015, where he teamed up with Yoshihisa Uto in a losing effort against Isamu Oshita and Tatsuo Omori as a result of a tag team match. On the same night, Kikuta competed two more times, once in a singles match in which he fell short to Hideyoshi Kamitani, and secondly in a falls count anywhere battle royal won by Yuji Okabayashi and also involving various other roster members such as Heddi Karaoui, Jaki Numazawa, Kankuro Hoshino, Ryuji Ito, Shinobu, Takayuki Ueki, Toshiyuki Sakuda and many others. Kikuta competed for various championships promoted by the company. At BJW Death Market 59 on January 31, 2021, he and his long-time tag team partner Ryuichi Kawakami defeated Astronauts (Fuminori Abe and Takuya Nomura) to win the BJW Tag Team Championship. At a house show from June 29, 2023, Kikuta teamed up with Hideyoshi Kamitani and Yuki Ishikawa to defeat Abdullah Kobayashi Daiju Wakamatsu and Kankuro Hoshino for the Yokohama Shopping Street 6-Man Tag Team Championship.

During his tenure with the company, he competed in various of its signature events. One of them is the Ikkitousen Strong Climb, in which he made his debut at the 2018 edition, where he placed himself in the B block, scoring a total of two points after competing against Kazuki Hashimoto, Yoshihisa Uto, Ryuichi Kawakami, Daisuke Sekimoto and Hideki Suzuki. At the 2020 edition, he fought in the D block, coming out the runner up with a total of five points scored after competing against Jason Lee, Yuya Aoki, Yasufumi Nakanoue and Takuya Nomura. At the 2022 edition he scored the runner up spot again with a total of eight points, losing the first place to Daisuke Sekimoto in the B block which also involved Daichi Hashimoto, Yuya Aoki, Kazuki Hashimoto and Kosuke Sato.

As for the Saikyo Tag League, Kikuta made his first appearance at the 2016 edition where he teamed up with Yoshihisa Uto, placing themselves in the Strong Style block B, and failing to score any points after competing against the teams of Ryuichi Kawakami and Yasufumi Nakanoue, Hideyoshi Kamitani and Daichi Hashimoto, and Akebono and Ryota Hama. At the 2018 edition, he teamed up with Ryuichi Kawakami in the Strong Style Block where they scored a total of six points after competing against the teams of Ryota Hama and Yasufumi Nakanoue, Daichi Hashimoto and Hideyoshi Kamitani, Tatsuhiko Yoshino and Kota Sekifuda, Hideki Suzuki and Daisuke Sekimoto, Kazuki Hashimoto and Yuya Aoki, and Takuya Nomura and Fuminori Abe. At the 2019 edition, he teamed up with Kawakami again, competing again in the strong style block with a total of eight points scored after competing against the teams of Shigehiro Irie and Yuji Okabayashi, Okami (Daichi Hashimoto and Hideyoshi Kamitani), Daisuke Sekimoto and The Bodyguard, StrongHearts (El Lindaman and T-Hawk), Ryota Hama and Yasufumi Nakanoue, Fuminori Abe and Takuya Nomura, and Akira Hyodo and Takuho Kato.

==== All Japan Pro Wrestling (2016–2019) ====
Kikuta shared a brief tenure with All Japan Pro Wrestling as developmental talent sent by BJW. He made his debut in the AJPW AJ Phoenix Series, making his first appearance at Vol.1 from February 15, 2016, where he fell short to Kento Miyahara in singles competition. At AJPW/BJW AJ Phoenix Vol. 2, a joint show co-promoted with BJW on April 27, 2016, Kikuta competed twice. First by teaming up with Yoshihisa Uto in a losing effort against Jake Lee and Naoya Nomura, and secondly by teaming up with Toshiyuki Sakuda in a losing effort against Hikaru Sato and Ryo Kawamura. He competed in the 2016 AJPW Dynamite Series, making his first appearance at the second night of the event from June 19, where he teamed up with Yoshihisa Uto and Yutaka Yoshie in a losing effort against Ryoji Sai, Tomoya and Yuma Aoyagi. At BJW Endless Survival 2019 on May 5, Kikuta and Ryuichi Kawakami teamed up and defeated Sweeper (Jake Lee and Koji Iwamoto) to win the All Asia Tag Team Championship.

==== Pro Wrestling Zero1 (2019–present) ====
Another promotion for which Kikuta mas worked as a developmental talent of behalf of BJW in Pro Wrestling Zero1. He made his first appearance at BJW/ZERO1 BIG ONE JAM, a co-promoted event which took place on June 7, 2019, he teamed up with Kohei Sato to defeat Okami (Daichi Hashimoto and Hideyoshi Kamitani). At BJW/ZERO1 Clash on June 3, 2022, he teamed up with Yasufumi Nakanoue and Yuki Ishikawa to defeat Astroman, Ryo Hoshino and Shoki Kitamura.

== Championships and accomplishments ==
- All Japan Pro Wrestling
  - All Asia Tag Team Championship (1 time) – with Ryuichi Kawakami
- Big Japan Pro Wrestling
  - BJW Tag Team Championship (2 times, current) – with Ryuichi Kawakami (1) and Toru Sugiura (1)
  - Yokohama Shopping Street 6-Man Tag Team Championship (3 times) – with Hideyoshi Kamitani and Yuki Ishikawa (1), Yasufumi Nakanoue and Yuya Aoki (1), Daisuke Sekimoto and Yasufumi Nakanoue (1)
- Niigata Pro Wrestling
  - Niigata Tag Team Championship (1 time) – with Ryuichi Kawakami
- Pro Wrestling Freedoms
  - King of Freedom World Championship (1 time)
