= Shinya Ishikawa =

Japanese professional wrestler

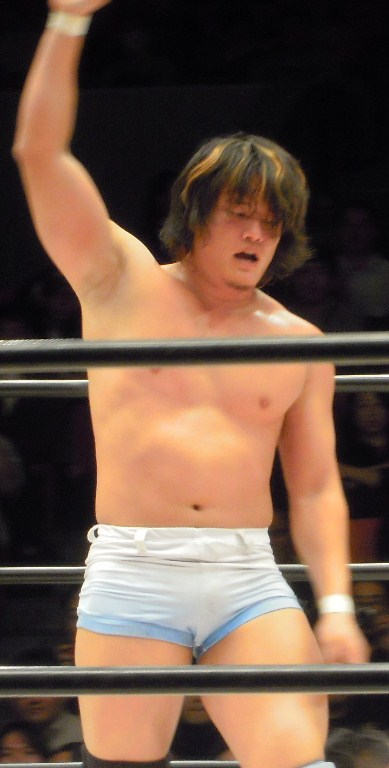
- Ishikawa in January 2011

Personal information
- Born: October 31, 1982 (age 43) Shikokuchuo, Japan

Professional wrestling career
- Ring name(s): Kaizo Ishikawa; Madness Dragon; Malcolm Ishikawa; Shinya Ishikawa
- Billed height: 1.80 m (5 ft 11 in)
- Billed weight: 94 kg (207 lb)
- Trained by: Daisuke Sekimoto
- Debut: 2008
- Retired: 2014

Shinya Ishikawa (石川晋也, Ishikawa Shin'ya) is a retired Japanese professional wrestler best known for his tenure with the Japanese professional wrestling promotion Big Japan Pro Wrestling (BJW).

== Professional wrestling career ==
=== Independent circuit (2008–2014) ===
Ishikawa is known for his appearances in various professional wrestling promotions. On the first night of the BJW World Triangle Night In Osaka, a three-night cross-over event produced between Westside Xtreme Wrestling, Combat Zone Wrestling and Big Japan Pro Wrestling which took place on July 28, 2012, he teamed up with Yoshihito Sasaki in a losing effort to Robert Dreissker and Walter. On the last night of the event from July 30, he teamed up with Bad Bones and Yoshihito Sasaki and defeated Axeman and Strong BJ (Daisuke Sekimoto and Yuji Okabayashi) in a six-man tag team match. At New Year`s Eve Toshikoshi, a cross-over event promoted by BJW in partnership with DDT Pro Wrestling and Kaientai Dojo on December 31, 2012, Ishikawa teamed up with Shinobu to defeat Yuki Sato and Taishi Takizawa.

==== Big Japan Pro Wrestling (2008–2014) ====
Ishikawa made his professional wrestling debut for Big Japan Pro Wrestling at the BJW Pro-Wrestling Thanksgiving Day event from March 16, 2008, where he fell short to Katsumasa Inoue in a singles match. He participated in one of the longest matches in professional wrestling history, a 108-man battle royal at Tenka Sanbun no Kei: New Year's Eve Special, a cross-over event held between Big Japan Pro Wrestling, DDT and Kaientai Dojo from December 31, 2009, competing against other infamous wrestlers such as Great Kojika, Taka Michinoku, Kenny Omega, Abdullah Kobayashi, and the winner of the match, Jun Kasai. On the second night of the BJW Fantastic Tour from December 13, 2009, he teamed up with Yoshihito Sasaki to defeat Daisuke Sekimoto and Yuji Okabayashi for the BJW Tag Team Championship.

He took part in the Ikkitousen Strong Climb, first competing at the 2012 edition which took place between February 26 and March 26, sharing the B Block with Yoshihito Sasaki, Bad Bones, Brahman Shu, Shinobu and Kazuki Hashimoto, scoring a total of two points. He made his last appearance on the 2014 edition of the event, where he placed himself in the A Block and scoring a total of six points after going against Shuji Ishikawa, Yuko Miyamoto, Atsushi Maruyama, Shiori Asahi and Hideyoshi Kamitani. Another signature event of BJW in which he took part was the Saikyo Tag League, achieving his best result at the 2012 edition, where he teamed up with Osamu Nishimura, placing themselves in the A Block, winning it by scoring a total of ten points after going against the teams of Yuji Okabayashi and Shinobu, Tsutomu Oosugi and Hercules Senga, Daisuke Sekimoto and Yoshihito Sasaki, Daichi Hashimoto and Kazuki Hashimoto, and Jun Ogawauchi and Amigo Suzuki. Unfortunately they fell short to Yuji Okabayashi and Shinobu in the semi-finals.

==== Pro Wrestling Noah (2013–2014) ====
Ishikawa worked for a brief period of time in Pro Wrestling Noah, scoring his first match on January 19, 2013, on the third night of the NOAH The First Navigation, where he participated in a 12-man battle royal, competing against notable opponents such as the winner Genba Hirayanagi, Atsushi Kotoge, Marshall Von Erich, Ross Von Erich, Hitoshi Kumano, Harlem Bravado, Lance Bravado, Taiji Ishimori, Takeshi Morishima and Yoshinari Ogawa. At Naomichi Marufuji's 15th career anniversary which took place at NOAH Summer Navigation 2013 on August 24, Ishikawa teamed up with Yoshihito Sasaki and unsuccessfully challenged TMDK (Mikey Nicholls and Shane Haste) for the GHC Tag Team Championship.

He took part in one of the biggest events of the promotion, the Global Tag League, and he made his first appearance at the 2013 edition, where he teamed up with Yoshihito Sasaki, plaving themselves in the Block B and scoring a total of two points after going against the teams of Brave (Atsushi Kotoge and Takashi Sugiura), Chaos (Takashi Iizuka and Toru Yano), TMDK (Mikey Nicholls and Shane Haste) and Diamond Ring (Katsuhiko Nakajima and Kensuke Sasaki).

== Championships and accomplishments ==
- Big Japan Pro Wrestling

- BJW World Strong Heavyweight Championship (1 time)
- BJW Tag Team Championship (1 time) – with Yoshihito Sasaki
- Yokohama Shopping Street 6-Man Tag Team Championship (2 times) – with Kankuro Hoshino and Ryuji Ito (1) and Ryuichi Kawakami and Yuji Okabayashi (1)

- Pro Wrestling Illustrated
  - Ranked No. 163 of the top 500 singles wrestlers in the PWI 500 in 2014
