= Yuya Aoki =

Yuya Aoki may refer to:

- Yuya Aoki, pen-name used by Japanese writer Shin Kibayashi
- Yuya Aoki (wrestler) (born 1996), Japanese professional wrestler
