= Akira Hyodo =

Japanese professional wrestler

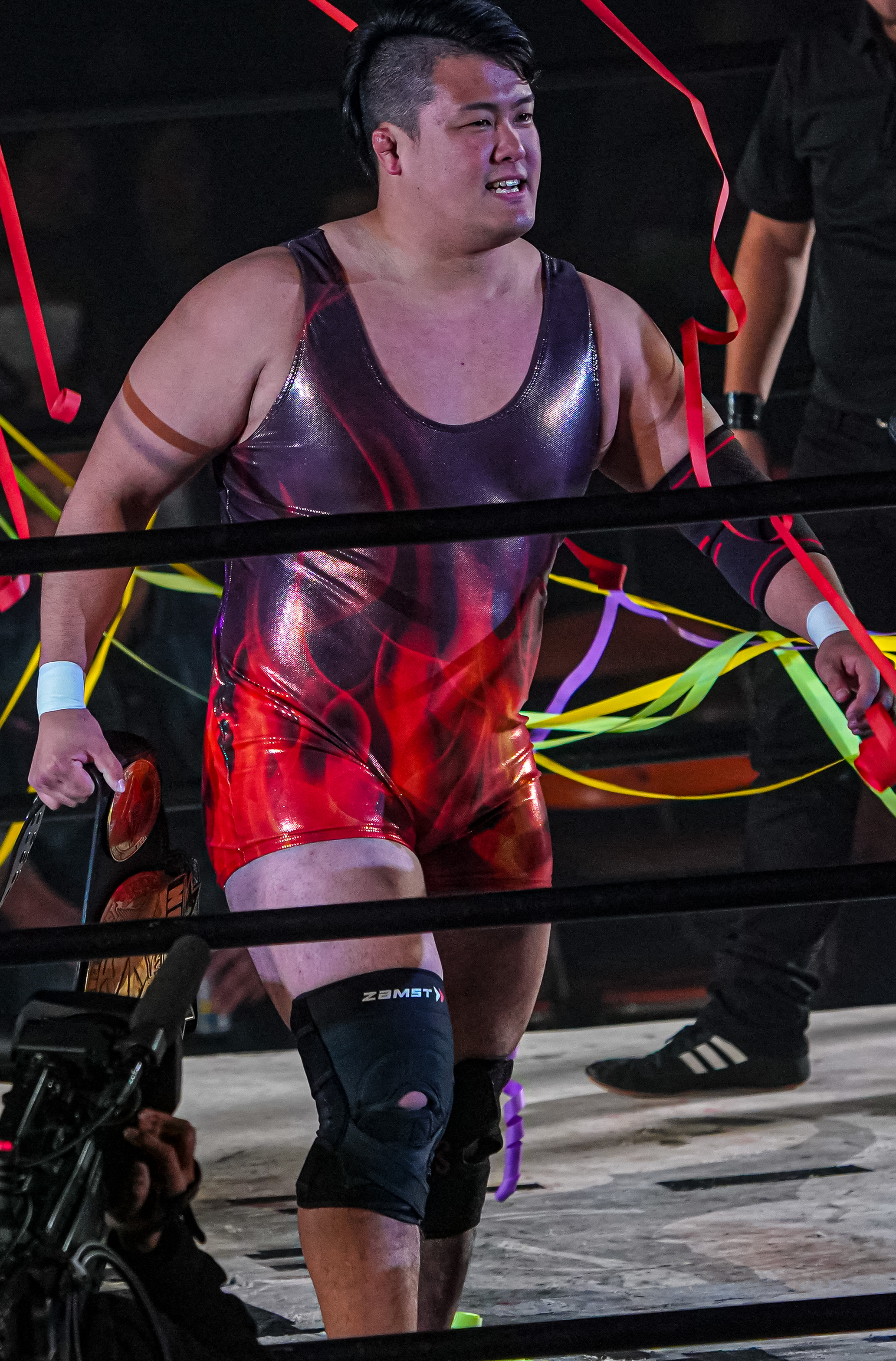
- Hyodo in December 2019

Personal information
- Born: April 30, 1995 (age 31) Saijō, Japan

Professional wrestling career
- Ring name(s): Akira Kyodo; Potchari Mask
- Billed height: 170 cm (5 ft 7 in)
- Billed weight: 105 kg (231 lb)
- Debut: 2018
- Retired: 2022

Akira Hyodo (兵頭彰, Hyodo Akira) is a Japanese retired professional wrestler best known for his tenure with the Japanese promotion Big Japan Pro Wrestling where he is a former Yokohama Shopping Street 6-Man Tag Team Champion.

== Professional wrestling career ==
=== Independent circuit (2018–2022) ===
Hyodo has worked as a freelancer for a small part of his career, competing in various promotions from the Japanese independent scene. He made sporadic appearances for All Japan Pro Wrestling and one of his most notable ones took place on the eighteenth night of the Real World Tag League from December 8, 2019, where he teamed up with Daisuke Sekimoto and fell short to Jake Lee and Naoya Nomura. At DDT/BJW Toshikoshi Pro-Wrestling, a cross-over event between BJW and DDT Pro-Wrestling which took place on December 31, 2020, he teamed up with Makoto Oishi and competed in a shuffle tag team tournament in which they fell short to Konosuke Takeshita and Takuya Nomura two times in the same night. At 2AW Tank Nagai Kanzen Nensho, an event promoted by Active Advance Pro Wrestling, he competed in Tank Nagai's retirement bout, a 24-person gauntlet match in which he, alongside 23 other participants defeated Nagai himself. The likes of the other participants were Ayame Sasamura, Ayato Yoshida, Tomato Kaji, Kengo Mashimo, Kotaro Yoshino, Tsukushi Haruka, Ricky Fuji and many others.

=== Big Japan Pro Wrestling (2018–2022) ===
Hyodo made his professional wrestling debut in Big Japan Pro Wrestling on the third night of the BJW Ueno Winter Festival from February 3, 2018, where he wrestled Yuki Ishikawa into a time-limit draw in an exhibition match. During his time with the company, he chased for various titles promoted by it. At BJW Dainichi Black Company Hell October Series Round 2 on October 9, 2021, he unsuccessfully challenged Drew Parker for the GCW Ultraviolent Championship. At BJW Death Market 66 on March 27, 2022, he unsuccessfully challenged Yuko Miyamoto for the BJW Deathmatch Heavyweight Championship in a Super G-Shock deathmatch. At BJW Osaka Surprise 58 ~ Perfect Star on April 24, 2022, he teamed up with his "GShock1010" tag team partner Kankuro Hoshino to unsuccessfully challenge Gaina and Taro Nohashi for the UWA World Tag Team Championship.

He is known for competing in various of the promotion's signature events. In the Ikkitousen Strong Climb, he made his first appearance at the 2020 edition of the tournament where he fought in the block A and scored a total of three points after competing against Daichi Hashimoto, Yoshiki Inamura, Ryuichi Kawakami and T-Hawk. He made his last appearance at the 2021 edition in which he fought in the block D where he scored a total of four points after competing against Hideyoshi Kamitani, Isami Kodaka and Yuki Ishikawa. As for the Ikkitousen Deathmatch Survivor, Hyodo made his only appearance at the 2021 edition of the tournament in which he competed in the block D where he scored a total of four points after going against Hideyoshi Kamitani, Isami Kodaka and Ishikawa. In the Saikyo Tag League, he made his only appearance at the 2019 edition where he teamed up with Takuho Kato and competed in the block A where they failed to score any points after competing against the teams of Shigehiro Irie and Yuji Okabayashi, Okami (Daichi Hashimoto and Hideyoshi Kamitani), Kazumi Kikuta and Ryuichi Kawakami, Daisuke Sekimoto and The Bodyguard, Ryota Hama and Yasufumi Nakanoue, StrongHearts (El Lindaman and T-Hawk), and Fuminori Abe and Takuya Nomura.

In September 2022, Hyodo announced his retirement from professional wrestling due to struggling with health problems.

== Championships and accomplishments ==
- Big Japan Pro Wrestling
  - Yokohama Shopping Street 6-Man Tag Team Championship (1 time) – with Daisuke Sekimoto and Takuho Kato
  - World Is Not Enough Six Man Tag Team Tournament (2020) – with Yuji Okabayashi and Yuji Hino
