= Sekifuda =

Sekifuda (written: 関札) is a rare Japanese surname. It is estimated that there are currently only around 10 people in Japan with this surname and it said that the surname is most common in Ishikawa Prefecture.

Notable people with the surname include:

- Kota Sekifuda (関札皓太, born 1995), Japanese professional wrestler
