= Yuya Aoki (wrestler) =

Japanese professional wrestler

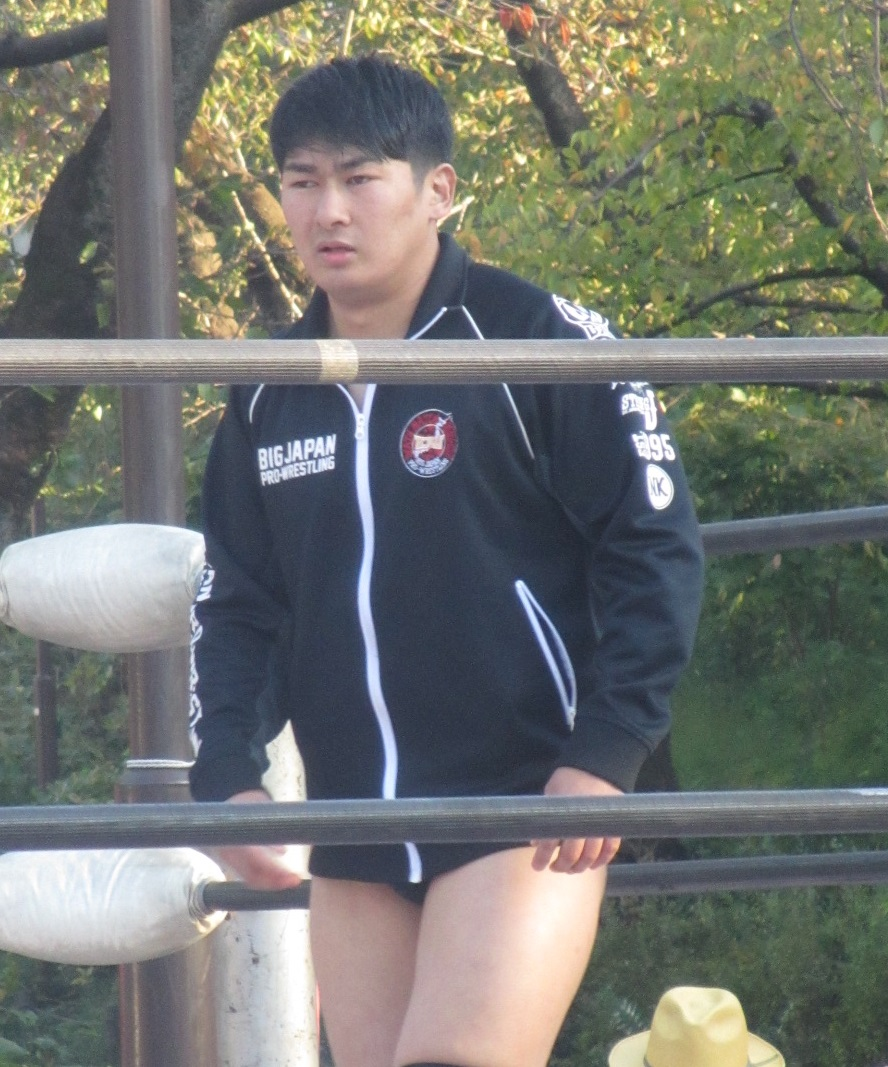
- Aoki in November 2019

Personal information
- Born: September 10, 1996 (age 29) Yokohama, Japan

Professional wrestling career
- Ring name: Yuya Aoki
- Billed height: 1.77 m (5 ft 10 in)
- Billed weight: 95 kg (209 lb)
- Trained by: Yuji Okabayashi
- Debut: 2017

Yuya Aoki (青木優也, Aoki Yūya) is a Japanese professional wrestler currently signed to Big Japan Pro Wrestling (BJW). He is a former BJW Junior Heavyweight Champion, Yokohama Shopping Street 6-Man Tag Team Champion and former longest reign one-time BJW World Strong Heavyweight Champion.

== Professional wrestling career ==
=== Big Japan Pro Wrestling (2017–present) ===
With a background in sumo, Aoki joined the Big Japan Pro Wrestling (BJW) dojo in April 2016 after being scouted by Yuji Okabayashi whilst in high school. He wrestled an exhibition match in November 2016 before making his official debut on January 17, 2017, in a losing effort against his mentor Okabayashi. In May, he joined BJW's newly established junior heavyweight division, Strong J, and entered the tournament to crown the inaugural BJW Junior Heavyweight Championship. On June 4, Aoki scored his first singles win in a shocking upset against veteran Shinobu. Despite this, he would finish the tournament bottom of the standings having lost his four other matches. Having defeated the eventual champion Shinobu, he unsuccessfully challenged him to a title match on November 1. In 2017, Aoki also made several appearances for major promotion All Japan Pro Wrestling (AJPW), including their 45th anniversary show. In March 2018, Aoki entered his first Ikkitousen Strong Climb where he managed to pick up win over Yasufumi Nakanoue. In August, he also entered his first Saikyo Tag League with Kazuki Hashimoto as part of the Strong Style Block; they picked up two wins and did not progress to the knockout stage. On October 8, after Hashimoto had defended his BJW Junior Heavyweight Championship against Tatsuhiko Yoshino, Aoki challenged him to a match at Ryōgokutan, BJW's annual Ryōgoku Kokugikan show, and backed up his claim when Aoki pinned Hashimoto in a six man tag on October 25. At Ryōgokutan 2018, on November 11, Aoki lost to Hashimoto. In Pro Wrestling Zero1 (Zero1), he participated in the 2019 Fire Festival and scored eight points in Block A with a win over Asuka and a draw against Super Tiger. On September 15, Aoki defeated former WWE star Tajiri to win the BJW Junior Heavyweight Championship, the first championship of his career. He made his first successful title defence at Ryōgokutan 2019, on November 4, defeating Kota Sekifuda, Tajiri and Tatsuhiko Yoshino in a four way match. Aoki made three further successful title defences before entering the 2020 Ikkitousen Strong Climb. After only one win in three matches, Aoki's tournament was already over by March 23, however, the remaining tournament matches would be cancelled due to the COVID-19 pandemic and Aoki would finish joint last with Yasufumi Nakanoue and Takuya Nomura. On October 21, Aoki lost the BJW Junior Heavyweight Championship to Tatsuhiko Yoshino. After the match, Aoki declared his intentions to move up to the heavyweight division, Strong BJ.

On December 26, he won the Yokohama Shopping Street 6-Man Tag Team Championship with Daichi Hashimoto and Hideyoshi Kamitani, defeating former champions Akira Hyodo, Daisuke Sekimoto and Takuho Kato. On July 4, 2021, he unsuccessfully challenged Yasufumi Nakanoue for the BJW World Strong Heavyweight Championship. On July 22, due to a brief absence of Hashimoto, the trio were forced to vacate their championship. Aoki and Kamitani attempted to regain the titles with Tatsuya Hanami but were unsuccessful. On November 20, Aoki won the Exciting League, a round robin tournament featuring BJW's young talent, having gone undefeated in five matches. On February 3, during a 2022 Ikkitousen Strong Climb tournament match against Daisuke Sekimoto, Aoki suffered a fractured left tibia and fibula. He returned to the ring on August 7, losing a six man tag team match.

== Championships and accomplishments ==
- Active Advance Pro Wrestling
  - 2AW Tag Team Championship (1 time) – with Tatsuya Hanami
- Big Japan Pro Wrestling
  - BJW World Strong Heavyweight Championship (1 time)
  - BJW Junior Heavyweight Championship (1 time)
  - Yokohama Shopping Street 6-Man Tag Team Championship (2 times) – with Daichi Hashimoto and Hideyoshi Kamitani (1) and Yasufumi Nakanoue and Kazumi Kikuta (1)
  - UWA World Tag Team Championship (1 time) – with Masaki Morihiro
  - Exciting League (2021)
  - Shuffle Tag Tournament (2019) – with Yasufumi Nakanoue
- Pro Wrestling Illustrated
  - Ranked No. 159 of the top 500 singles wrestlers in the PWI 500 in 2024
