= Kota Sekifuda =

Japanese professional wrestler

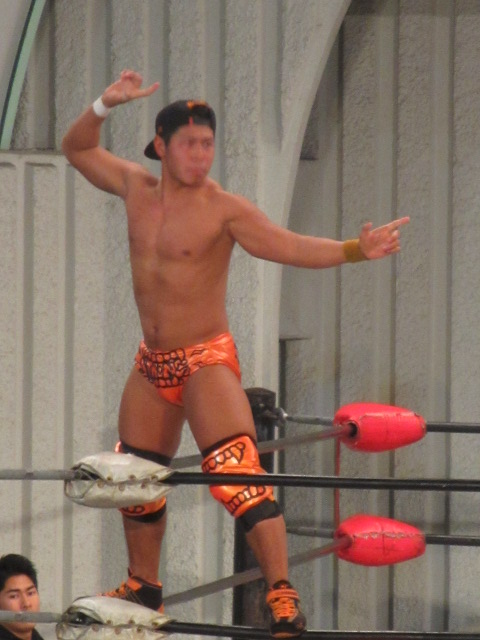
- Sekifuda in February 2018

Personal information
- Born: June 24, 1995 (age 31) Nonoichi, Japan

Professional wrestling career
- Ring name(s): Kota Seikifuda; Kota Sekifuda
- Billed height: 167 cm (5 ft 6 in)
- Billed weight: 91 kg (201 lb)
- Trained by: Daisuke Sekimoto; Yuji Okabayashi
- Debut: 2014

Kota Sekifuda (関札皓太, Sekifuda Kōta) is a Japanese professional wrestler currently working for the Japanese promotion Big Japan Pro Wrestling (BJW), where he is a former BJW Junior Heavyweight Champion.

== Professional wrestling career ==
=== Independent circuit (2014–present) ===
==== American independent scene (2016) ====
As a freelancer, Sekifuda is known for his matches in various promotions. During a brief time in the American independent scene, he made his US debut at IGNITE Wrestling in April 2016, appearing on a card featuring Serpentico, Mr 450, and Lio Rush. He also wrestled in a 20-person battle royal promoted by Ring Warriors on May 14, 2016, at the Ring Warriors May Mayhem event, also involving Rob Terry, Mr. 450, Steve Madison and other notable opponents.

==== Japanese circuit (2015–present) ====
Sekifuda competed in the Japanese independent scene for most of his career. On December 30, 2019, at a house show of Oriental Wrestling Entertainment (OWE), he teamed up with Yuya Aoki in a losing effort to Mr. T-Cool and Seiki Yoshioka. At the Toshiwasure! Shuffle Tag Tournament 2019, a one night event promoted by Big Japan Pro Wrestling in partnership with Dramatic Dream Team, Sekifuda teamed up with Soma Takao and wrestled Ryuichi Kawakami and T-Hawk in a time-limit draw in a first round match.

At BJW/ZERO1/2AW 3 Groups Joint Performance, a cross-over event produced by Big Japan Pro Wrestling (BJW), Pro Wrestling Zero1 (Zero1) and Active Advance Pro Wrestling (2AW) on August 11, 2020, he teamed up with Drew Parker, Takuya Sugawara and Tatsuhiko Yoshino in a losing effort to Kaji Tomato, Ricky Fuji, Shoki Kitamura and Sugi in an eight-man tag team match. At BJW/ZERO1 Clash, a cross-over event produced by Big Japan Pro Wrestling and Pro Wrestling Zero1 on October 30, 2020, Sekifuda teamed up with Hartley Jackson and defeated Takuya Sugawara and Yasufumi Nakanoue in a tag team match.

At GLEAT Fan Meeting In Sapporo, an event promoted by the Gleat promotion on May 5, 2021, Parker teamed up with Drew Parker in a losing effort to Cima and Kaz Hayashi.

==== Big Japan Pro Wrestling (2014–present) ====
Sekifuda made his professional wrestling debut on the second night of the BJW Nai Nippon Summer Ueno Pro-Wrestling Festival from August 6, 2014, where he teamed up with Yuichi Taniguchi in a losing effort against Toshiyuki Sakuda and Kazuki Hashimoto. He unsuccessfully competed for the Yokohama Shopping Street 6-Man Tag Team Championship by teaming up with Ryuichi Kawakami and Tatsuhiko Yoshino at BJW Ehime Sake Shop Wrestling in Saijo on May 19, 2018, in a losing effort to Ryota Hama, Yasufumi Nakanoue and Yoshihisa Uto. At BJW Ueno Park Convention on February 1, 2020, he competed in a 20-man battle royal also involving Yuji Okabayashi, Brahman Kei and Brahman Shu, Hideyoshi Kamitani and others. On July 22, 2021, at BJW Yokohama Radiant Hall Tournament, Sekifuda defeated Isami Kodaka to win his first title in his career, the BJW Junior Heavyweight Championship.

Sekifuda is known for competing in signature events promoted by BJW. One of them is the Saikyo Tag League, making his first appearance at the 2018 edition of the tournament where he teamed up with Tatsuhiko Yoshino, placing themselves in the Strong Style Block and scoring a total of six points after facing the teams of Ryota Hama and Yasufumi Nakanoue, Daichi Hashimoto and Hideyoshi Kamitani, Ryuichi Kawakami and Kazumi Kikuta, Hideki Suzuki and Daisuke Sekimoto, Takuya Nomura and Fuminori Abe, and Kazuki Hashimoto and Yuya Aoki.

Sekifuda took part in a BJW Junior Heavyweight Championship #1 Contender's Tournament to determine Shinobu's challenger between June 13 and July 17, 2018, where he defeated Tsutomu Oosugi in the first round and then fell short to Kazuki Hashimoto in the second round.

== Other information ==
The surname of Sekifuda is rare with only around 10 people in Japan carrying the name. Sekifuda has said that he has never met anyone outside of his family with the same surname.

== Championships and accomplishments ==
- Big Japan Pro Wrestling
  - BJW Junior Heavyweight Championship (2 times)
  - UWA World Tag Team Championship (1 time) – with Tomato Kaji
- Pro Wrestling Illustrated
  - Ranked No. 314 of the top 500 singles wrestlers in the PWI 500 in 2024
- Pro Wrestling Freedoms
  - Barefoot King Championship (1 time)
