= Izumi Junior College =

Private junior college in Sagamihara, Kanagawa, Japan

Coordinates: 35°33′07″N 139°23′25″E

- 和泉短期大学; Izumi tanki daigaku
- Type: Private
- Established: 1960
- Location: Sagamihara, Kanagawa, Kanagawa, Japan
- Website: Official website

Izumi Junior College (和泉短期大学, Izumi tanki daigaku) is a Christian-affiliated private junior college in Sagamihara, Kanagawa, Japan.

Founded as a school for kindergarten teachers in 1960, it was located in Setagaya, Tokyo. It changed its name to Izumi Junior College in 1965. In 1974, it relocated to its present location in Sagamihara. Formerly a women's junior college, in 2001, it became coeducational.
