= Yokohama Shopping Street 6-Man Tag Team Championship =

Professional wrestling trios tag team championship

- Current design of the Yokohama Shopping Street 6-Man Tag Team Championship (2012 – present)

Details
- Promotion: Big Japan Pro Wrestling
- Date established: April 8, 2012
- Current champions: Yosomono (Daichi Hashimoto, So Daimonji and Joji Otani)
- Date won: January 25, 2026
Statistics
- First champions: Kazuki Hashimoto, Takumi Tsukamoto and Yuji Okabayashi
- Most reigns: As tag team: (8 reigns): 3rd Generation Chimidoro Brothers (Masaya Takahashi, Takayuki Ueki and Toshiyuki Sakuda); As individual (11 reigns): Abdullah Kobayashi
- Longest reign: Chicharito Shoki, Yasufumi Nakanoue and Yuji Okabayashi (599 days)
- Oldest champion: Great Kojika (73 years, 83 days)
- Youngest champion: Takuho Kato (21 years)
- Heaviest champion: Ryota Hama (495 lbs)

Yokohama Shopping Street 6-Man Tag Team Championship is a professional wrestling six-man tag team championship owned by the Big Japan Pro Wrestling (BJW) promotion. The title was created on August 4, 2012. As the name suggests, the title is usually defended in the Yokohama shopping street area. The title was first announced in May 2012 and the first champions were crowned when the team of Kazuki Hashimoto, Takumi Tsukamoto and Yuji Okabayashi defeated Yoshihito Sasaki, Shinya Ishikawa and Masashi Otani in a six-man tag team match.

There have been a total of 53 reigns shared between 39 different teams consisting of 54 distinctive champions. The current champions are Yosomono (Daichi Hashimoto, So Daimonji and Joji Otani) who are in their first reign as a team.

== Title history ==
As of November 22, 2026.

Key
No.	Overall reign number
Reign	Reign number for the specific team—reign numbers for the individuals are in parentheses, if different
Days	Number of days held
Defenses	Number of successful defenses
+	Current reign is changing daily

No.	Champion	Championship change			Reign statistics			Notes	Ref.
No.	Champion	Date	Event	Location	Reign	Days	Defenses	Notes	Ref.
1	Kazuki Hashimoto, Takumi Tsukamoto and Yuji Okabayashi	August 4, 2012	House show	Yokohama, Kanagawa	1	35	0	Defeated Yoshihito Sasaki, Shinya Ishikawa and Masashi Otani to become the inaugural champions.	
2	Kankuro Hoshino, Ryuji Ito and Shinya Ishikawa	September 8, 2012	House show	Yokohama, Kanagawa	1	127	0		
3	Abdullah Kobayashi, Jaki Numazawa and Kazuki Hashimoto	January 13, 2013	House show	Yokohama, Kanagawa	1 (1, 1, 2)	141	0		
—	Vacated	June 3, 2013	—	—	—	—	—	The title was vacated due to Abdullah Kobayashi being diagnosed with hepatitis C.	
4	Ryuichi Kawakami, Shinya Ishikawa and Yuji Okabayashi	June 16, 2013	House show	Yokohama, Kanagawa	1 (1, 1, 2)	220	3		
—	Vacated	January 22, 2014	—	—	—	—	—	The title was vacated due to Yuji Okabayashi no-showing during a title defense.	
5	Daisuke Sekimoto, Jaki Numazawa and Ryuji Ito	August 9, 2014	Tsurumi Ginza Shopping Street 60th Anniversary	Yokohama, Kanagawa	1 (1, 2, 2)	310	0	Defeated Kazuki Hashimoto, Ryuichi Kawakami and Shinya Ishikawa to win the vacant title.	
6	Brahman Kei, Brahman Shu and Takayuki Ueki	June 15, 2015	Dainichi Nigiwa Theater - The Oath Of Black Angel Seitansai 38	Yokohama, Kanagawa	1	35	0		
7	Heisei Gokudo Combi (Kankuro Hoshino, Masato Inaba and Great Kojika)	July 20, 2015	Ryōgokutan 2015	Tokyo, Japan	1 (2, 1, 1)	338	1		
—	Vacated	June 22, 2016	—	—	—	—	—	The title was vacated due to Masato Inaba's neck injury.	
8	Abdullah Kobayashi, Masaya Takahashi and Takayuki Ueki	July 24, 2016	Ryōgokutan 2017	Tokyo, Japan	1 (2, 1, 2)	295	5	Defeated B Faultless Junky's (Jaki Numazawa, Masashi Takeda and Takumi Tsukamoto) in an Iron Maiden Run to the Hell Deathmatch to win the vacant title.	
9	Moon Vulcan (Hideki Suzuki, Takuya Nomura and Yoshihisa Uto)	May 15, 2017	House show	Hamamatsu, Shizuoka	1	19	0		
10	Ryota Hama, Shogun Okamoto and Yasufumi Nakanoue	June 3, 2017	House show	Yokohama, Kanagawa	1	197	1		
11	Daisuke Sekimoto, Hideyoshi Kamitani and Kohei Sato	December 17, 2017	BJW Death Vegas#2017	Yokohama, Kanagawa	1 (2, 1, 1)	125	0		
12	Ryota Hama, Yasufumi Nakanoue and Yoshihisa Uto	April 21, 2018	Edogawa Rising 3	Tokyo, Japan	1 (2, 2, 2)	31	5		
13	Daichi Hashimoto, Hideyoshi Kamitani and Ryuichi Kawakami	May 22, 2018	Dainichi and Clover Tour	Tokyo, Japan	1 (1, 2, 2)	3	0		
14	Ryota Hama, Yasufumi Nakanoue and Yoshihisa Uto	May 25, 2018	Dainichi and Clover Tour	Tokyo, Japan	2 (3, 3, 3)	5	2		
15	Daichi Hashimoto, Daisuke Sekimoto and Hideyoshi Kamitani	May 30, 2018	Pro-Wrestling and Fast Food Drop Kick 4th Anniversary Memorial Convention	Hirao, Yamaguchi	1 (2, 3, 3)	1	0		
16	Ryota Hama, Yasufumi Nakanoue and Yoshihisa Uto	May 31, 2018	House show	Kagoshima, Kagoshima	3 (4, 4, 4)	17	1		
17	Daichi Hashimoto, Daisuke Sekimoto and Hideyoshi Kamitani	June 17, 2018	Wrestle Fest in Matsuyama	Matsuyama, Ehime	2 (3, 4, 4)	3	0		
18	Ryota Hama, Yasufumi Nakanoue and Yoshihisa Uto	June 20, 2018	House show	Tokyo, Japan	4 (5, 5, 5)	34	4		
19	3rd Generation Chimidoro Brothers (Masaya Takahashi, Takayuki Ueki and Toshiyuki Sakuda)	July 24, 2018	House show	Tokyo, Japan	1 (2, 3, 1)	11	0		
20	Abdullah Kobayashi, Jaki Numazawa and Ryuji Ito	August 4, 2018	Shopping Street Pro-Wrestling 2018 Fourth Battle	Yokohama, Kanagawa	1 (3, 3, 3)	1	0		
21	3rd Generation Chimidoro Brothers (Masaya Takahashi, Takayuki Ueki and Toshiyuki Sakuda)	August 5, 2018	BJW Death Pit 17	Sendai, Japan	2 (3, 4, 2)	59	1		
22	Abdullah Kobayashi, Jaki Numazawa and Yuko Miyamoto	October 3, 2018	BJW AU Shop Ashino Presents #RR9	Kushiro, Japan	1 (4, 4, 1)	6	1		
23	3rd Generation Chimidoro Brothers (Masaya Takahashi, Takayuki Ueki and Toshiyuki Sakuda)	October 9, 2018	BJW	Asahikawa, Japan	3 (4, 5, 3)	1	0		
24	Jaki Numazawa, Ryuji Ito and Yuko Miyamoto	October 10, 2018	BJW	Yubetsu, Japan	1 (5, 4, 2)	1	0		
25	3rd Generation Chimidoro Brothers (Masaya Takahashi, Takayuki Ueki and Toshiyuki Sakuda)	October 11, 2018	BJW	Yakumo, Japan	4 (5, 6, 4)	8	1		
26	Ryota Hama, Takeshi Irei and Yasufumi Nakanoue	October 19, 2018	BJW - BJ Style #21	Yokohama, Kanagawa	1 (6, 1, 6)	29	0		
27	3rd Generation Chimidoro Brothers (Masaya Takahashi, Takayuki Ueki and Toshiyuki Sakuda)	November 17, 2018	BJW Osaka Surprise 39	Sendai, Miyagi	5 (6, 7, 5)	113	6	This was the semi-final round match of the 6-Man Sacred Ground City of Forest Sendai Tournament.	
28	Abdullah Kobayashi, Hideki Suzuki and Yoshihisa Uto	March 10, 2019	BJW Ikkitousen ~ Death Match Survivor 2019 - Day 2	Fukuoka, Japan	1 (5, 1, 6)	11	0		
29	FUMA, SAGAT and Yusuke Kubo	March 21, 2019	DDT BASARA 90 ~ Itto Ryodan	Tokyo, Japan	1	6	0		
30	Sento Minzoku (Isami Kodaka, Minoru Fujita and Ryuichi Sekine)	March 27, 2019	DDT BASARA 91 ~ Banquet	Tokyo, Japan	1	27	0		
31	Abdullah Kobayashi, Hideki Suzuki and Yoshihisa Uto	April 23, 2019	DDT BASARA 94 ~ Banquet	Tokyo, Japan	2 (6, 2, 7)	12	0		
32	Ryuji Ito, Takashi Sasaki and Yuko Miyamoto	May 5, 2019	BJW Endless Survivor 2019	Yokohama, Japan	1 (5, 1, 3)	25	0		
33	3rd Generation Chimidoro Brothers (Masaya Takahashi, Takayuki Ueki and Toshiyuki Sakuda)	May 30, 2019	BJW	Tokyo, Japan	6 (7, 8, 6)	29	4		
34	Abdullah Kobayashi, Drew Parker and Yoshihisa Uto	June 28, 2019	BJW	Naganuma, Japan	1 (7, 1, 8)	3	0	This was a fluorescent light tube death match. Drew Parker was the first gaijin wrestler to have ever won the title.	
35	3rd Generation Chimidoro Brothers (Masaya Takahashi, Takayuki Ueki and Toshiyuki Sakuda)	July 1, 2019	BJW	Hamatonbetsu, Japan	7 (8, 9, 7)	3	1		
36	Abdullah Kobayashi, Drew Parker and Yoshihisa Uto	July 4, 2019	BJW	Fukuoka, Japan	2 (8, 2, 9)	66	3		
37	3rd Generation Chimidoro Brothers (Masaya Takahashi, Takayuki Ueki and Toshiyuki Sakuda)	September 8, 2019	BJW	Fukuoka, Japan	8 (9, 10, 8)	22	0		
—	Vacated	September 30, 2019	—	—	—	—	—	The title was vacated due to unknown circumstances.	
38	Akira Hyodo, Daisuke Sekimoto and Takuho Kato	October 3, 2019	BJW	Asahikawa, Japan	1 (1, 5, 1)	450	5	Defeated Abdullah Kobayashi, Kankuro Hoshino, and Yuko Miyamoto to win the vacant titles.	
39	Daichi Hashimoto, Hideyoshi Kamitani and Yuya Aoki	December 26, 2020	BJW	Japan	1 (4, 5, 1)	208	4		
—	Vacated	July 22, 2021	—	—	—	—	—		
40	Chicharito Shoki, Yasufumi Nakanoue and Yuji Okabayashi	July 22, 2021	BJW	Yokohama, Japan	1 (1, 7, 3)	599	6	Defeated Hideyoshi Kamitani, Yuya Aoki and Tatsuya Hanami to win the vacant titles.	
41	Abdullah Kobayashi, Daiju Wakamatsu and Kankuro Hoshino	March 12, 2023	2AW/BJW Big Advance	Yokohama, Japan	1 (9, 1, 3)	109	1		
42	Hideyoshi Kamitani, Kazumi Kikuta and Yuki Ishikawa	June 29, 2023	BJW	Tokyo, Japan	1 (6, 1, 1)	101	7		
43	Daichi Hashimoto, Kazumasa Yoshida and Yasufumi Nakanoue	October 8, 2023	BJW Shopping Street Wrestling 2023 Series ~ New Chapter Begins Round 6	Yokohama, Japan	1 (5, 1, 8)	6	0		
44	Project Havoc (Leyton Buzzard, Tempesta and Tyson Maddux)	October 14, 2023	BJW Shopping Street Wrestling 2023 Series ~ New Chapter Begins Round 7	Yokohama, Japan	1	14	0		
45	Kazumi Kikuta, Yasufumi Nakanoue and Yuya Aoki	October 28, 2023	BJW Hatagaya Rokugo Street Shopping Pro-Wrestling	Tokyo, Japan	1 (2, 9, 2)	75	1		
46	Masaki Morihiro and Okami (Daichi Hashimoto and Hideyoshi Kamitani)	January 11, 2024	BJW	Yokohama, Japan	1 (1, 6, 7)	80	1		
47	Kankuro Hoshino, Kengo Takai and Kenta Kosugi	March 31, 2024	BJW Death Market 78	Nagoya, Japan	1 (4, 1, 1)	56	1		
48	Daisuke Sekimoto, Kazumi Kikuta and Yasufumi Nakanoue	May 26, 2024	BJW Death Market 79	Nagoya, Japan	1 (6, 3, 10)	236	1		
49	Abdullah Kobayashi, Kankuro Hoshino and Ryuji Ito	January 17, 2025	BJW 2025 Kanagawa Start:Dash!!	Yokohama, Japan	1 (10, 5, 6)	354	4		
50	Tatsuhiko Yoshino and Brahman Brothers (Brahman Kei and Brahman Shu)	January 6, 2026	BJW WELCOME TO BJW	Tokyo, Japan	1 (1, 2, 2)	8	0		
51	Abdullah Kobayashi, Kankuro Hoshino and Ryuji Ito	January 14, 2026	BJW	Tokyo, Japan	2 (11, 6, 7)	11	0		
52	Kengo Takai, Kenta Kosugi and Mari Manji	January 25, 2026	BJW Death Market 88	Tokyo, Japan	1 (2, 2, 1)	182	2	Manji became the first female wrestler to hold the titles.	
53	Yosomono (Daichi Hashimoto, So Daimonji and Joji Otani)	July 26, 2026	BJW Death Market 91	Nagoya, Japan	1 (7, 1, 1)	119+	8		

== Combined reigns ==
=== By team ===
As of November 22, 2026.

†	Indicates the current champion

Rank	Team	No. of reigns	Combined defenses	Combined days
1	Chicharito Shoki, Yasufumi Nakanoue and Yuji Okabayashi	1	6	599
2	Akira Hyodo, Daisuke Sekimoto and Takuho Kato	1	5	450
3	Abdullah Kobayashi, Kankuro Hoshino and Ryuji Ito	2	4	365
4	Heisei Gokudo Combi (Kankuro Hoshino, Masato Inaba and Great Kojika)	1	1	338
5	Daisuke Sekimoto, Jaki Numazawa and Ryuji Ito	1	0	310
6	Abdullah Kobayashi, Masaya Takahashi and Takayuki Ueki	1	5	295
7	3rd Generation Chimidoro Brothers (Masaya Takahashi, Takayuki Ueki and Toshiyuki Sakuda)	8	13	246
8	Daisuke Sekimoto, Kazumi Kikuta and Yasufumi Nakanoue	1	1	236
9	Ryuichi Kawakami, Shinya Ishikawa and Yuji Okabayashi	1	3	220
10	Daichi Hashimoto, Hideyoshi Kamitani and Yuya Aoki	1	4	208
11	Ryota Hama, Shogun Okamoto and Yasufumi Nakanoue	1	1	197
12	Kengo Takai, Kenta Kosugi and Mari Manji	1	2	182
13	Abdullah Kobayashi, Jaki Numazawa and Kazuki Hashimoto	1	0	141
14	Kankuro Hoshino, Ryuji Ito and Shinya Ishikawa	1	0	127
15	Daisuke Sekimoto, Hideyoshi Kamitani and Kohei Sato	1	0	125
16	Yosomono † (Daichi Hashimoto, So Daimonji and Joji Otani)	1	8	119+
17	Abdullah Kobayashi, Daiju Wakamatsu and Kankuro Hoshino	1	1	109
18	Hideyoshi Kamitani, Kazumi Kikuta and Yuki Ishikawa	1	7	101
19	Ryota Hama, Yasufumi Nakanoue and Yoshihisa Uto	4	12	87
20	Masaki Morihiro and Okami (Daichi Hashimoto and Hideyoshi Kamitani)	1	1	80
21	Kazumi Kikuta, Yasufumi Nakanoue and Yuya Aoki	1	1	75
22	Abdullah Kobayashi, Drew Parker and Yoshihisa Uto	2	3	69
23	Kankuro Hoshino, Kengo Takai and Kenta Kosugi	1	1	56
24	Brahman Kei, Brahman Shu and Takayuki Ueki	1	0	35
24	Kazuki Hashimoto, Takumi Tsukamoto and Yuji Okabayashi	1	0	35
26	Ryota Hama, Takeshi Irei and Yasufumi Nakanoue	1	0	29
27	Sento Minzoku (Isami Kodaka, Minoru Fujita and Ryuichi Sekine)	1	0	27
28	Ryuji Ito, Takashi Sasaki and Yuko Miyamoto	1	0	25
29	Abdullah Kobayashi, Hideki Suzuki and Yoshihisa Uto	2	0	23
30	Moon Vulcan (Hideki Suzuki, Takuya Nomura and Yoshihisa Uto)	1	0	19
31	Project Havoc (Leyton Buzzard, Tempesta and Tyson Maddux)	1	0	14
32	Tatsuhiko Yoshino and Brahman Brothers (Brahman Kei and Brahman Shu)	1	0	8
33	Abdullah Kobayashi, Jaki Numazawa and Yuko Miyamoto	1	0	6
33	FUMA, SAGAT and Yusuke Kubo	1	0	6
33	Daichi Hashimoto, Kazumasa Yoshida and Yasufumi Nakanoue	1	0	6
36	Daichi Hashimoto, Daisuke Sekimoto and Hideyoshi Kamitani	2	0	4
37	Daichi Hashimoto, Hideyoshi Kamitani and Ryuichi Kawakami	1	0	3
38	Jaki Numazawa, Ryuji Ito and Yuko Miyamoto	1	0	1
38	Abdullah Kobayashi, Jaki Numazawa and Ryuji Ito	1	0	1

=== By wrestler ===
As of November 22, 2026.

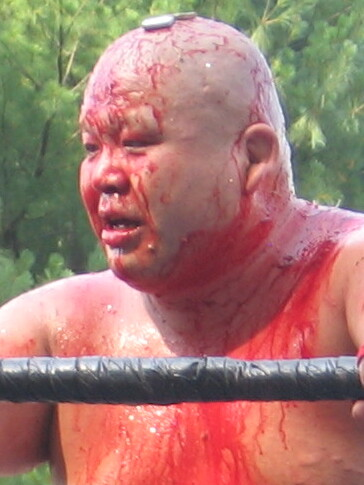
Record eleven-time champion as individual, Abdullah Kobayashi.

†	Indicates the current champion

Rank	Wrestler	No. of reigns	Combined defenses	Combined days
1	Yasufumi Nakanoue	10	21	1,229
2	Daisuke Sekimoto	6	6	1,125
3	Abdullah Kobayashi	11	14	1,009
4	Kankuro Hoshino	6	7	995
5	Yuji Okabayashi	3	9	837
6	Ryuji Ito	7	4	829
7	Chicharito Shoki	1	6	599
8	Takayuki Ueki	10	18	576
9	Hideyoshi Kamitani	7	12	565
10	Masaya Takahashi	9	18	541
11	Jaki Numazawa	5	1	459
12	Akira Hyodo	1	5	450
12	Takuho Kato	1	5	450
14	Kazumi Kikuta	3	9	412
15	Daichi Hashimoto †	7	13	420+
16	Shinya Ishikawa	2	3	347
17	Great Kojika	1	1	338
17	Masato Inaba	1	1	338
19	Ryota Hama	6	13	313
20	Yuya Aoki	2	5	283
21	Toshiyuki Sakuda	8	13	246
22	Kengo Takai	2	3	238
22	Kenta Kosugi	2	3	238
24	Ryuichi Kawakami	2	3	223
25	Yoshihisa Uto	9	12	198
26	Shogun Okamoto	1	1	197
27	Mari Manji	1	2	182
28	Kazuki Hashimoto	2	0	176
29	Kohei Sato	1	0	125
30	So Daimonji †	1	8	119+
30	Joji Otani †	1	8	119+
32	Daiju Wakamatsu	1	1	109
33	Yuki Ishikawa	1	7	101
34	Masaki Morihiro	1	1	80
35	Drew Parker	2	3	69
36	Brahman Kei	2	0	43
36	Brahman Shu	2	0	43
38	Hideki Suzuki	3	0	42
39	Takumi Tsukamoto	1	0	35
40	Yuko Miyamoto	3	1	32
41	Takeshi Irei	1	0	29
42	Isami Kodaka	1	0	27
42	Minoru Fujita	1	0	27
42	Ryuichi Sekine	1	0	27
45	Takashi Sasaki	1	0	25
46	Takuya Nomura	1	0	19
47	Leyton Buzzard	1	0	14
47	Tempesta	1	0	14
47	Tyson Maddux	1	0	14
50	Tatsuhiko Yoshino	1	0	8
51	FUMA	1	0	6
51	Kazumasa Yoshida	1	0	6
51	SAGAT	1	0	6
51	Yusuke Kubo	1	0	6

== See also ==
- KO-D 6-Man Tag Team Championship
- Open the Triangle Gate Championship
- UWA World Trios Championship
- NEVER Openweight 6-Man Tag Team Championship
