= Ryuichi Kawakami =

Japanese professional wrestler

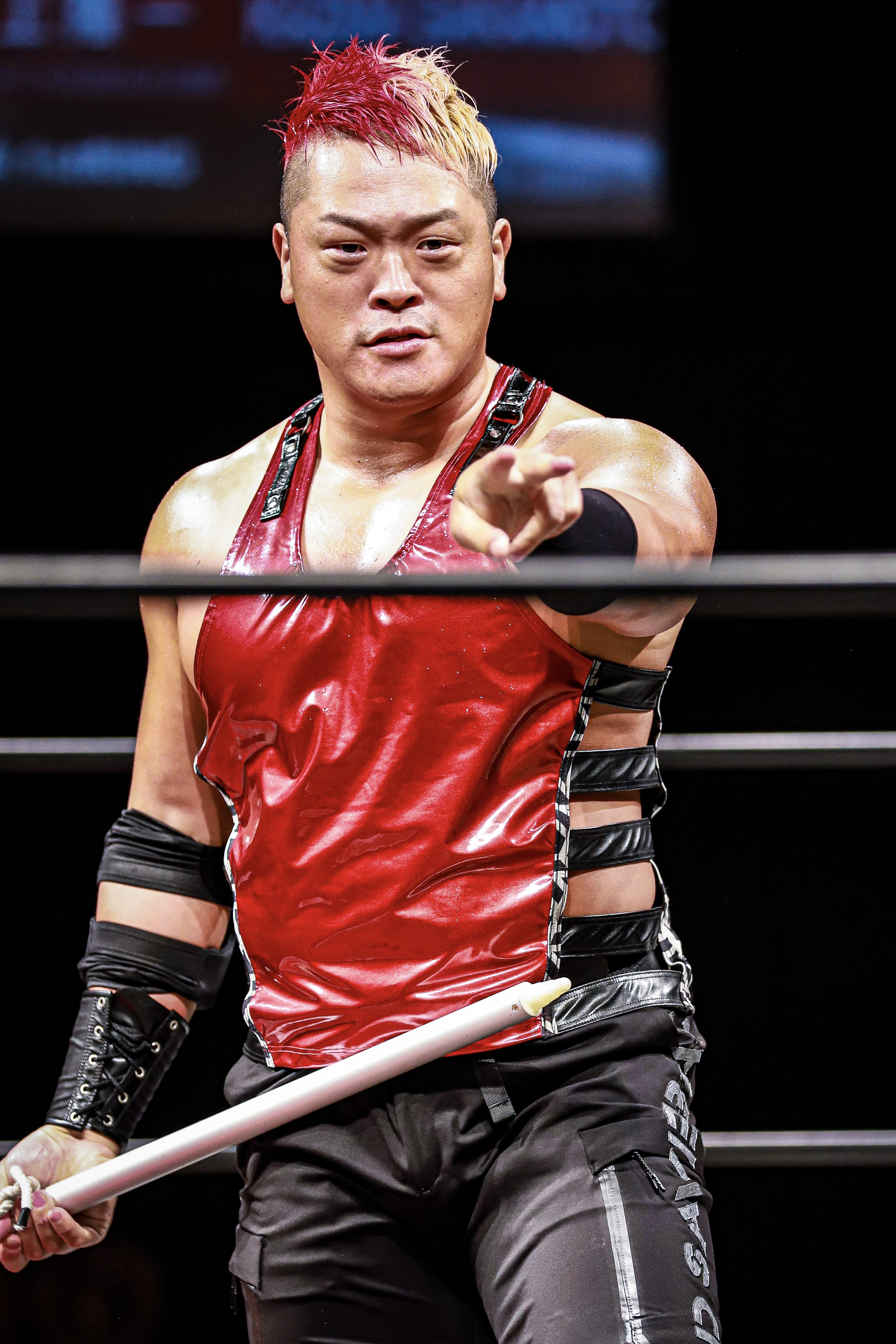
- Kawakami in April 2023

Personal information
- Born: November 29, 1988 (age 37) Fujisawa, Kanagawa, Japan

Professional wrestling career
- Ring name(s): Caithness Kawakami; Ryuichi Kawakami; Ryuichi "Fire" Kawakami; Trans-Am★Ryuichi; Brahman Ryu
- Billed height: 180 cm (5 ft 11 in)
- Billed weight: 100 kg (220 lb)
- Trained by: Daisuke Sekimoto
- Debut: 2008

Ryuichi Kawakami (河上隆一, Kawakami Ryūichi) is a Japanese professional wrestler, currently signed to Gleat and is best known for his tenure with the Japanese promotions Big Japan Pro Wrestling (BJW) and DDT Pro Wrestling (DDT).

== Professional wrestling career ==
=== Independent circuit (2009–present) ===
Kawakami is known for his work in various promotions. He participated at the BJW/CZW CZW Arena In Japan ~ BJW For MASADA, a cross-over event between Big Japan Pro Wrestling (BJW) and Combat Zone Wrestling (CZW) from January 5, 2014 where he teamed up with Kazuki Hashimoto to defeat Hideyoshi Kamitani and Takayuki Ueki. At BJW Endless Survival 2019 on May 5, an event produced in partnership with All Japan Pro Wrestling, he teamed up with Kazumi Kikuta and defeated Sweeper (Jake Lee and Koji Iwamoto) to win the All Asia Tag Team Championship.

At BJW/ZERO1/2AW 3 Groups Joint Performance, an event produced by BJW in partnership with Pro Wrestling Zero1 and Active Advance Pro Wrestling on August 11, 2020, Kawakami teamed up with Kazumi Kikuta and Yuya Aoki in a losing effort to Okami (Daichi Hashimoto and Hideyoshi Kamitani) and Hartley Jackson. He marked an appearance for Pro Wrestling Noah on the fourth night of the NOAH Higher Ground 2020 from February 16, where he teamed up with Daisuke Sekimoto to defeat Kongo (Masa Kitamiya and Yoshiki Inamura).

=== Westside Xtreme Wrestling (2014) ===
Kawakami made several appearances for the German promotion Westside Xtreme Wrestling (wXw) in his european tour. His first match for the promotion took place on January 18, 2014 at wXw Back To The Roots XIII, where he teamed up with Kazuki Hashimoto to unsuccessfully challenge Hot And Spicy (Axel Dieter Jr. and Da Mack) for the wXw World Tag Team Championship. He even participated in the 16 Carat Gold Tournament 2014, falling short to Robert Dreissker in the first-round on March 14.

=== Big Japan Pro Wrestling (2008–2021) ===
Kawakami made his professional wrestling debut at a house show hosted by Big Japan Pro Wrestling (BJW) on December 19, 2008, where he teamed up with Yuji Okabayashi and Katsumasa Inoue, scoring a defeat against Atsushi Ohashi, Shinya Ishikawa and Yoshihito Sasaki in a six-man tag team match.

Kawakami is known for participating in signature events of the promotion such as the Ikkitousen Strong Climb. At the inaugural edition of the event from 2012, he took part of the Block A and scored a total of two points after competing against Daisuke Sekimoto, Sami Callihan, Yuji Okabayashi, Masashi Otani and Takumi Tsukamoto.

Another event where he fought is the Saikyo Tag League, making his first appearance at the 2011 edition of the event where he teamed up with Shinya Ishikawa, placing themselves in the Block A, and scoring one point after competing against the teams of Shadow WX and Kankuro Hoshino, Tommy End and Michael Dante, Abdullah Kobayashi and Masashi Takeda, Daisuke Sekimoto and Yuji Okabayashi, and Jun Kasai and Jaki Numazawa. His marked his best result at the 2018 edition after he teamed up with Kazumi Kikuta in the Strong Style Block and scoring a total of six points after competing against Kazuki Hashimoto and Yuya Aoki, Takuya Nomura and Fuminori Abe, Hideki Suzuki and Daisuke Sekimoto, Tatsuhiko Yoshino and Kota Sekifuda, Daichi Hashimoto and Hideyoshi Kamitani, and Ryota Hama and Yasufumi Nakanoue.

Kawakami participated in other notable tournaments hosted by BJW. He won the 2009 D-Dash Tag Team Tournament teaming up with Shinya Ishikawa, defeating Shigehiro Irie and Shun Kasagi in a first-round match, Masashi Takeda and Takuma Obe in the semi-finals and Yuji Okabayashi and Atsushi Ohashi in the finals on December 21. He also won the 2013 Strong Style Rising Tournament by defeating D. J. Hyde in the first round, Masato Inaba in the quarter-finals, Shinya Ishikawa in the semi-finals and Yuji Okabayashi in the finals on June 5.

=== DDT Pro Wrestling/Pro Wrestling Basara (2013–2021) ===
Kawakami also works for the Pro-Wrestling Basara branch of DDT Pro Wrestling (DDT) under the name of Trans-Am★Ryuichi. His most notable victory was against Fuma a DDT Tavern Pro Wrestling: Alcohol Mania on March 23, 2017 when he captured the Union Max Championship. He won the Heaven Summit Itadaki tournament from 2017 by defeating Fuma in the finals from July 5, 2017, match which was also for the Union Max Championship. Kawakami placed himself in the Block A and scored a total of ten points against Isami Kodaka, Ryota Nakatsu, Sagat, Gouma Ryu and Smoke.

=== Gleat (2021–present) ===
Kawakami made his debut in the Gleat promotion at GLEAT Ver. 1 on July 1, 2021 where he picked up a victory against T-Hawk.

== Championships and accomplishments ==
- All Japan Pro Wrestling
  - All Asia Tag Team Championship (1 time) – with Kazumi Kikuta
- Big Japan Pro Wrestling
  - BJW Tag Team Championship (1 time) – with Kazumi Kikuta
  - Yokohama Shopping Street 6-Man Tag Team Championship (2 times) – with Daichi Hashimoto and Hideyoshi Kamitani (1) and Shinya Ishikawa and Yuji Okabayashi
  - Strong Style Rising Tournament (2013)
  - D-Dash Tag Team Tournament (2009) – with Shinya Ishikawa
- Gleat
  - G-Infinity Championship (2 times, inaugural) – with Kazma Sakamoto (1, inaugural) and Quiet Storm (1)
  - G-Infinity Title First Champion Decision Tournament (2022) with – Kazma Sakamoto
- Niigata Pro Wrestling
  - Niigata Openweight Championship (1 time)
  - Niigata Tag Team Championship (1 time) – with Kazumi Kikuta
- Pro-Wrestling Basara
  - Union Max Championship (1 time)
  - Itadaki (2017)
- Tenryu Project
  - Tenryu Project 6-Man Tag Team Championship (1 time) – with Buki, Classic Kid and Heddi French
