= Shinobu Sugawara =

Japanese professional wrestler

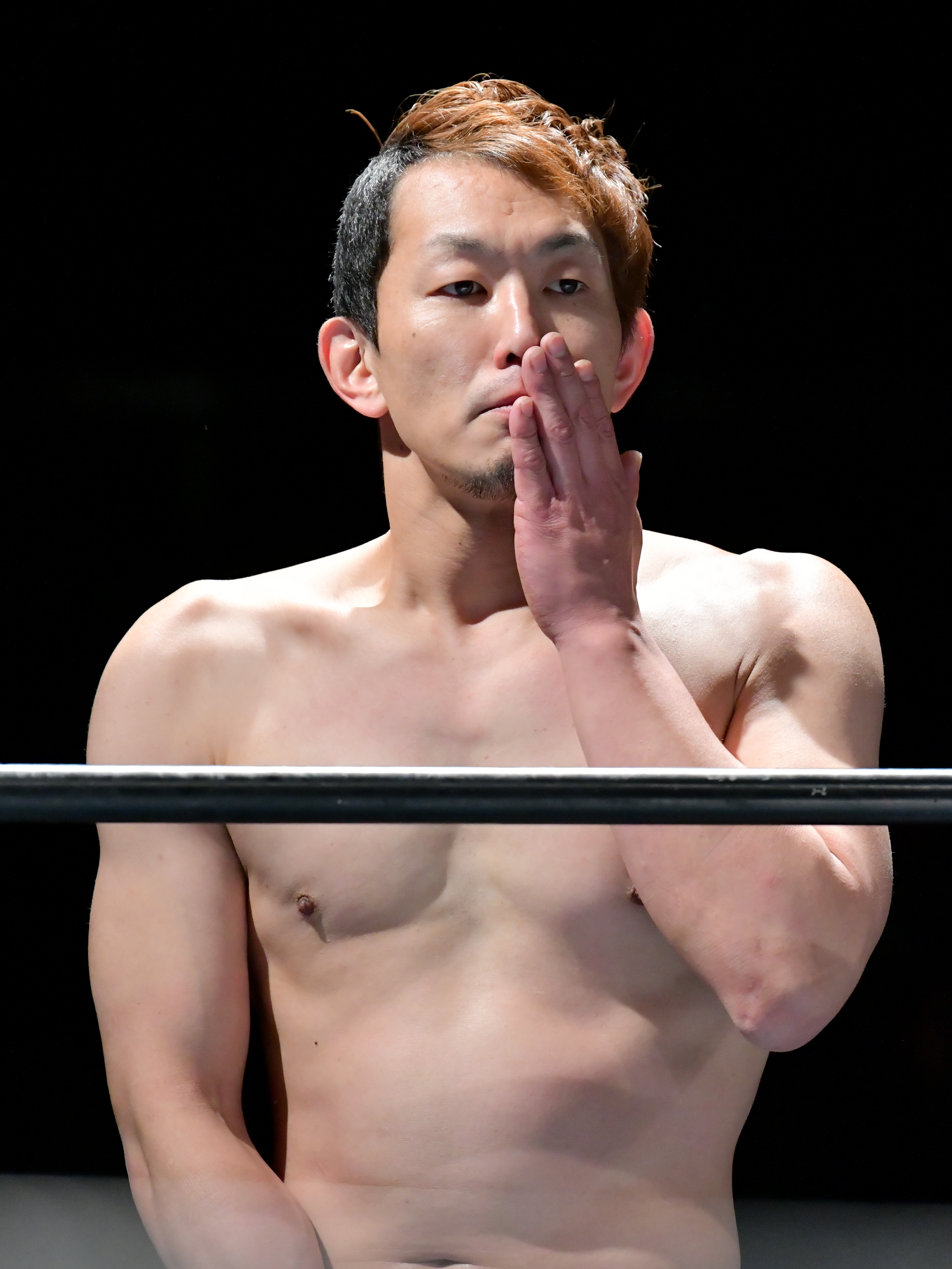
- Shinobu in December 2019

Personal information
- Born: September 2, 1980 (age 45) Tome, Miyagi, Japan

Professional wrestling career
- Ring name(s): Achilles Shinobu; Aphrodite Shinobu; Baku Sei; Magnum KYOTO; Masked Buddy; Shinobu; Super Shenlong
- Billed height: 1.73 m (5 ft 8 in)
- Billed weight: 78 kg (172 lb)
- Trained by: Mens Teioh; Onryo
- Debut: June 6, 2004

Shinobu Sugawara (菅原 忍, Sugawara Shinobu; born September 2, 1980), better known mononymously by his ring name Shinobu, is a Japanese professional wrestler. He has worked in several promotions, in particular 666, Big Japan Pro Wrestling (BJW) and Dragon Gate (DG).

== Professional wrestling career ==
Sugawara started his career in Ritsumeikan Pro Wrestling, a backyard wrestling promotion formed by Ritsumeikan University students. He debuted as Magnum KYOTO, a Magnum TOKYO parody, and gained fame before being transferred to Onryo's 666 promotion. He then changed his name to Shinobu and adopted the gimmick of a salacious bisexual. He wore pink tights and performed sexual antics in his matches, particularly harassing his opponents and wrestling while nude. Shinobu worked in Wrestling Marvelous Future and Big Japan Pro Wrestling (BJW), where he became a trainee for Mens Teioh.

In December 2006, he debuted in Dragon Gate as Super Shenlong, a dragon-like masked character billed from China. Wrestling both in NEX and main shows, he lost a mask vs. hair match against Yuki Ono in the Stalker Ichikawa Bom-Ba-Ye 2007 and was meant to leave the promotion, but YAMATO convinced him to stay in and join his New Hazard stable. After the RH demise, he joined Tozawa-juku along Akira Tozawa, Kenichiro Arai and Taku Iwasa as an "exchange student", and gained the Open the Triangle Gate Championship with Arai and Iwasa from Real Hazard (Gamma, Shingo Takagi and YAMATO). Their reign was short, as Real Hazard regained the championship one month later. After a failed challenge for the Open the Brave Gate Championship against Genki Horiguchi, he left Dragon Gate.

== Championships and accomplishments ==
- 666
  - 666 Kikansha Championship (1 time, current)
- Big Japan Pro Wrestling
  - BJW Junior Heavyweight Championship (1 time, inaugural)
  - BJW Tag Team Championship (2 times) – with Yoshihito Sasaki (1) and Yuji Okabayashi (1)
  - BJW Junior Heavyweight Championship Tournament (2017)
- Dragon Gate
  - Open the Triangle Gate Championship (1 time) – with Kenichiro Arai and Taku Iwasa
- Dramatic Dream Team

- Ironman Heavymetalweight Championship (216 times)

- Kaientai Dojo
  - UWA World Middleweight Championship (1 time)
- Michinoku Pro Wrestling
  - Futaritabi Tag Team Tournament (2008) – with MEN's Teioh
- Specialist Global Pro-Wrestling
  - SGP Global Junior Heavyweight Championship (1 time, current)
