= Kankuro Hoshino =

Japanese professional wrestler

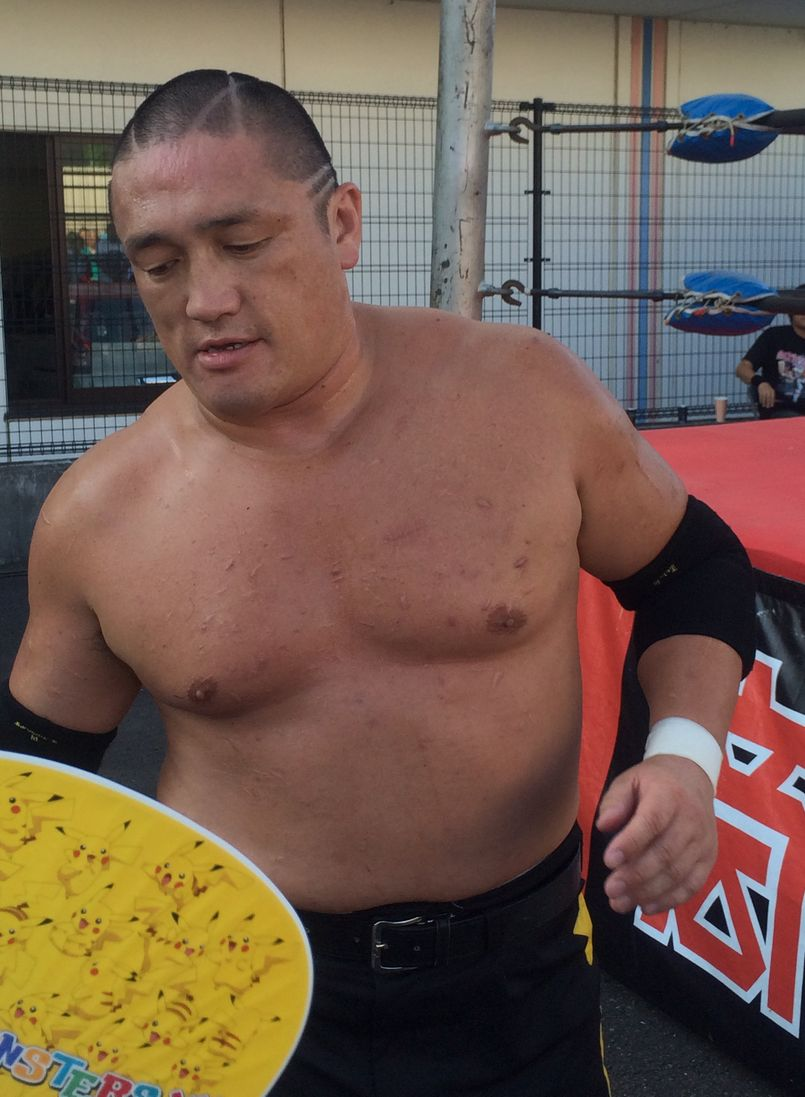
- Hoshino in August 2015

Personal information
- Born: Naotake Hoshino; July 6, 1975 (age 51) Saitama, Japan

Professional wrestling career
- Ring name(s): Kaijin Busaiking; Hoshi Mercury; Daio Ikemen; Kankuro Hoshino
- Billed height: 1.75 m (5 ft 9 in)
- Billed weight: 100 kg (220 lb)
- Debut: 2005

Naotake Hoshino (星野直丈, Hoshino Naotake) is a Japanese professional wrestler best known for his time with the Japanese professional wrestling promotions Big Japan Pro Wrestling (BJW) and Dramatic Dream Team (DDT). He performs under the ring name Kankuro Hoshino (星野勘九郎, Hoshino Kankurō).

== Professional wrestling career ==
=== Independent circuit (2005–present) ===
Hoshino competed at BJW World Triangle Night In Korakuen, a cross-over event held between Westside Xtreme Wrestling, Combat Zone Wrestling and Big Japan Pro Wrestling on July 30, 2012, where he teamed up with his Heisei Gokudo Combi stable partner Masato Inaba in a losing effort to Shadow WX and Clint Margera. He participated at another event produced by the three promotions, the wXw/CZW/BJW Triangle Of Ultraviolence: Messengers Of Death, where on the second night from October 3, 2011, he fell short to Jimmy Havoc. Hoshino made a couple of appearances for Chikara Pro Wrestling, where at CHIKARA King Of Trios 2010, he teamed up with Daisuke Sekimoto and Yuji Okabayashi as Team Big Japan Wrestling, defeating Team Frighting (Frightmare, Hallowicked and Mike Quackenbush) on the first night from April 23, 2010. On the second night from April 24, they defeated Team Future Is Now (Equinox, Helios and Jigsaw) in the quarter-finals, but fell short one night later on April 25 to Die Bruderschaft des Kreuzes (Ares, Claudio Castagnoli and Tursas) in the semi-finals.

=== Big Japan Pro Wrestling (2007–present) ===
Hoshino is best known for his long-time tenure with Big Japan Pro Wrestling, promotion for which he debuted at BJW Lazona Kawasaki 3 Days on December 27, 2007, where he scored a defeat against Ryuji Ito. He participated in one of the longest matches in professional wrestling history, a 108-man battle royal at Tenka Sanbun No Kai - New Years Eve Special, a cross-over event held between Big Japan Pro Wrestling, DDT and Kaientai Dojo from December 31, 2009, competing against other infamous wrestlers such as Kota Ibushi, Taka Michinoku, Kenny Omega, Abdullah Kobayashi, and the winner of the match, Jun Kasai. At BJW Ryogokutan 2016 on July 26, Hoshino defeated Ryuji Ito in a scaffold and G-Shock death match to win the BJW Death Match Heavyweight Championship. At BJW Death Market 58 on November 29, 2020, Hoshino teamed up with Yuko Miyamoto to defeat Minoru Fujita and Jaki Numazawa in a fluorescent lighttubes death match. Hoshino is a former Yokohama Shopping Street 6-Man Tag Team Champion, title which he last won alongside Great Kojika and Masato Inaba as Heisei Gokudo Combi at BJW Ryogokutan 2015 on July 20 by defeating Brahman Kei, Brahman Shu and Takayuki Ueki.

== Championships and accomplishments ==
- Big Japan Pro Wrestling
  - BJW Deathmatch Heavyweight Championship (1 time)
  - BJW Tag Team Championship (1 time) – with Ryuji Ito
  - Yokohama Shopping Street 6-Man Tag Team Championship (6 times) – with Masato Inaba and Great Kojika (1), Shinya Ishikawa and Ryuji Ito (1), Abdullah Kobayashi and Daiju Wakamatsu (1), Kengo Takai and Kenta Kosugi (1), and Abdullah Kobayashi and Ryuji Ito (2)
- Guts World Pro-Wrestling
  - GWC 6-Man Tag Team Championship (1 time) – with Daisuke and Masashi Takeda
