= Kazuki Hashimoto =

Japanese professional wrestler (born 1990)

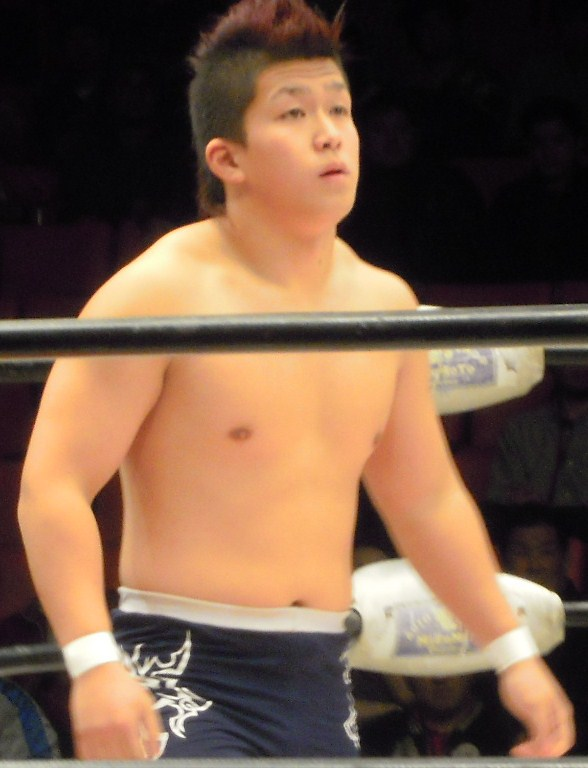

Personal information
- Born: Kazuki Hashimoto (橋本 和樹, Hashimoto Kazuki); May 25, 1990 (age 36) Soka, Saitama, Japan

Professional wrestling career
- Ring name: Kazuki Hashimoto
- Billed height: 1.70 m (5 ft 7 in)
- Billed weight: 80 kg (180 lb)
- Trained by: Daisuke Sekimoto; Animal Hamaguchi; Big Japan Pro Wrestling
- Debut: September 21, 2009

Kazuki Hashimoto (橋本 和樹, Hashimoto Kazuki; born May 25, 1990) is a Japanese professional wrestler currently signed to Big Japan Pro Wrestling (BJW), competing in the Strong J division, where he is a former BJW Junior Heavyweight Champion.

== Professional wrestling career ==
Hashimoto enrolled in Animal Hamaguchi's professional wrestling dojo while still in high school at the age of 18 in 2008, and eventually graduated from the school in 2009. Hashimoto then joined Big Japan Pro Wrestling's dojo for further training before making his debut on September 21, wrestling Takumi Tsukamoto to a time limit draw. Only a few months into his career, Hashimoto won Kaientai Dojo (K-Dojo)'s 2010 K-Metal League, defeating Ganko Taketo in the final. This earned him a match for the Independent Junior Heavyweight Championship, where he unsuccessfully challenged Marines Mask on June 20, 2010. Hashimoto competed primarily in BJW for the next few years of his career, whilst also making occasional appearances for All Japan Pro Wrestling (AJPW) and Pro Wrestling Zero1 (Zero1). While in Zero1, Hashimoto began teaming with Daichi Hashimoto, dubbing themselves "Team Yamato". Though they share the same surname, they are not related in any way. In late 2012, Team Yamato took part in the Big Japan Tag League, finishing with 4 points and failing to advance to the final.

In January 2014, Hashimoto debuted for German promotion Westside Xtreme Wrestling (wXw), teaming with Ryuichi Kawakami to unsuccessfully challenge Hot & Spicy (Axel Dieter Jr. and Da Mack) for the wXw World Tag Team Championship. On June 1, he and Daisuke Sekimoto unsuccessfully challenged Dangan Yankees (Takashi Sugiura and Masato Tanaka) for the NWA Intercontinental Tag Team Championship. In November, he teamed with Koji Kanemoto in the 2014 Saikyo Tag League, making it to the final where they were defeated by Yankee Nichokenju (Isami Kodaka and Yuko Miyamoto). In early 2015, he and Sekimoto took part in Pro Wrestling Noah (Noah)'s 2015 Global Tag League, finishing with one win and two points and failing to advance to the final.

In early 2016, Hashimoto took part in AJPW's Junior Battle of Glory, but was forced to pull out after suffering an arm injury. Hashimoto spent five months recovering from the injury, and eventually returned to the ring on August 23, 2016, having lost 16 kilograms and looking in better shape than he did prior to his injury.

== Championships and accomplishments ==
- Big Japan Pro Wrestling

- BJW Junior Heavyweight Championship (1 time)
- Yokohama Shopping Street 6-Man Tag Team Championship (2 times) – with Takumi Tsukamoto and Yuji Okabayashi (1) and Abdullah Kobayashi and Jaki Numazawa (1)
- Sakatako Intercontinental Tag Team Championship (1 time) – with Daisuke Sekimoto

- Kaientai Dojo

- K-Metal League (2010)

- Michinoku Pro Wrestling

- Tohoku Tag Team Championship (1 time) – with Musashi

- Tenryu Project

- Tenryu Project World 6-Man Tag Team Championship (1 time) — with Daichi Hashimoto and Hideyoshi Kamitani
