= Kazumasa Yoshida (wrestler) =

Japanese professional wrestler (born 1995)

Personal information
- Born: 17 December 1995 (age 30) Kyōtango, Japan

Professional wrestling career
- Ring name: Brahman Kazu Kazumasa Yoshida
- Billed height: 185 cm (6 ft 1 in)
- Billed weight: 100 kg (220 lb)
- Debut: 2021

Kazumasa Yoshida (吉田和正, Yoshida Kazumasa) is a Japanese professional wrestler signed to Big Japan Pro Wrestling (BJW) where he is the current BJW World Strong Heavyweight Champion in his first reign. He is also known for competing in promotions of the Japanese independent scene such as Tenryu Project and Pro Wrestling Zero1.

== Professional wrestling career ==
=== Big Japan Pro Wrestling (2021–present) ===
Yoshida made his professional wrestling debut in Big Japan Pro Wrestling at BJW Front Row on April 17, 2021, where he wrestled Hiroyuki Suzuki into a time-limit draw. He won the first title of his career, the Yokohama Shopping Street 6-Man Tag Team Championship, by teaming up with Daichi Hashimoto and Yasufumi Nakanoue and defeating Hideyoshi Kamitani, Kazumi Kikuta and Yuki Ishikawa at BJW Shopping Street Wrestling 2023 Series on October 8, 2023, At BJW Osaka Surprise 70 ~ Big Thanksgiving 2023 on December 24, he unsuccessfully challenged So Daimonji for the All Asia Heavyweight Championship. At BJW Big Japan 31 Beyond The Survivor on April 29, 2026, Yoshida won his first singles title of his career, the BJW World Strong Heavyweight Championship, after defeating So Daimonji.

Yoshida competed in several of the promotion's signature events. In the Ikkitousen Strong Climb, he made his first appearance at the 2025 edition where he competed in Block A, scoring a total of two points against So Daimonji, Hideyoshi Kamitani and Yuya Aoki. In the Saikyo Tag League, Yoshida competed for the first time at the 2022 edition of the tournament where he teamed up with Daisuke Sekimoto, bottoming Block A with four points after going against the teams of Fuminori Abe and Takuya Nomura, Hiroyuki Suzuki and Takuho Kato, Andy Wu and Yasufumi Nakanoue, Isami Kodaka and Yuko Miyamoto, Kazumi Kikuta and Kohei Sato, Kota Sekifuda and Tomato Kaji, Masaya Takahashi and Masked GO!GOGO, and Jaki Numazawa and Ryuji Ito.

Yoshida also competed in several cross-over events held by BJW in partnership with DDT Pro-Wrestling. At BJW/DDT Toshikoshi Pro-Wrestling 2023 on December 31, he competed in the Toshiwasure! Shuffle Tournament in which he teamed up with Soma Takao and Trans-Am Hiroshi and fell short to Kazusada Higuchi, Kohei Kinoshita and Yasufumi Nakanoue in thr first rounds. At BJW New Standard Big "B" ~ Don't Wanna Stop on April 20, 2025, he teamed up with Yuya Aoki to unsuccessfully challenge Astronauts (Fuminori Abe and Takuya Nomura) for the KO-D Tag Team Championship.

=== Tenryu Project (2021–present) ===
Yoshida often competes in Tenryu Project as a BJW developmental talent. He chased for various accomplishments. At Tenryu Project Osaka Crush Night 2025 on December 13, he teamed up with Aran Sano to unsuccessfully challenge Masayuki Kono and Kohei Sato for the United National Tag Team Championship. At IJ Tag And Six-Man Tag Title New Decision Tournaments on October 3, 2026, he teamed up with Quiet Storm and Yasufumi Nakanoue to unsuccessfully challenge Kohei Sato, Satsuki Nagao and Takuro Niki in a tournament for the Tenryu Project WAR World 6-Man Tag Team Championship.

He competed in the promotion's only signature event, the Ryūkon Cup, he made his first appearance in the inaugural edition of 2021, where he defeated Hub in the first rounds, then fell short to Masayuki Kono in the second.

== Championships and accomplishments ==
- Big Japan Pro Wrestling
  - BJW World Strong Heavyweight Championship (1 time, current)
  - Yokohama Shopping Street 6-Man Tag Team Championship (1 time) – with Yasufumi Nakanoue and Daichi Hashimoto
- Niigata Pro Wrestling
  - Niigata Junior Heavyweight Championship (1 time)
- Pro Wrestling Illustrated
  - Ranked No. 386 of the top 500 wrestlers in the PWI 500 in 2026
