= Daiju Wakamatsu =

Japanese professional wrestler

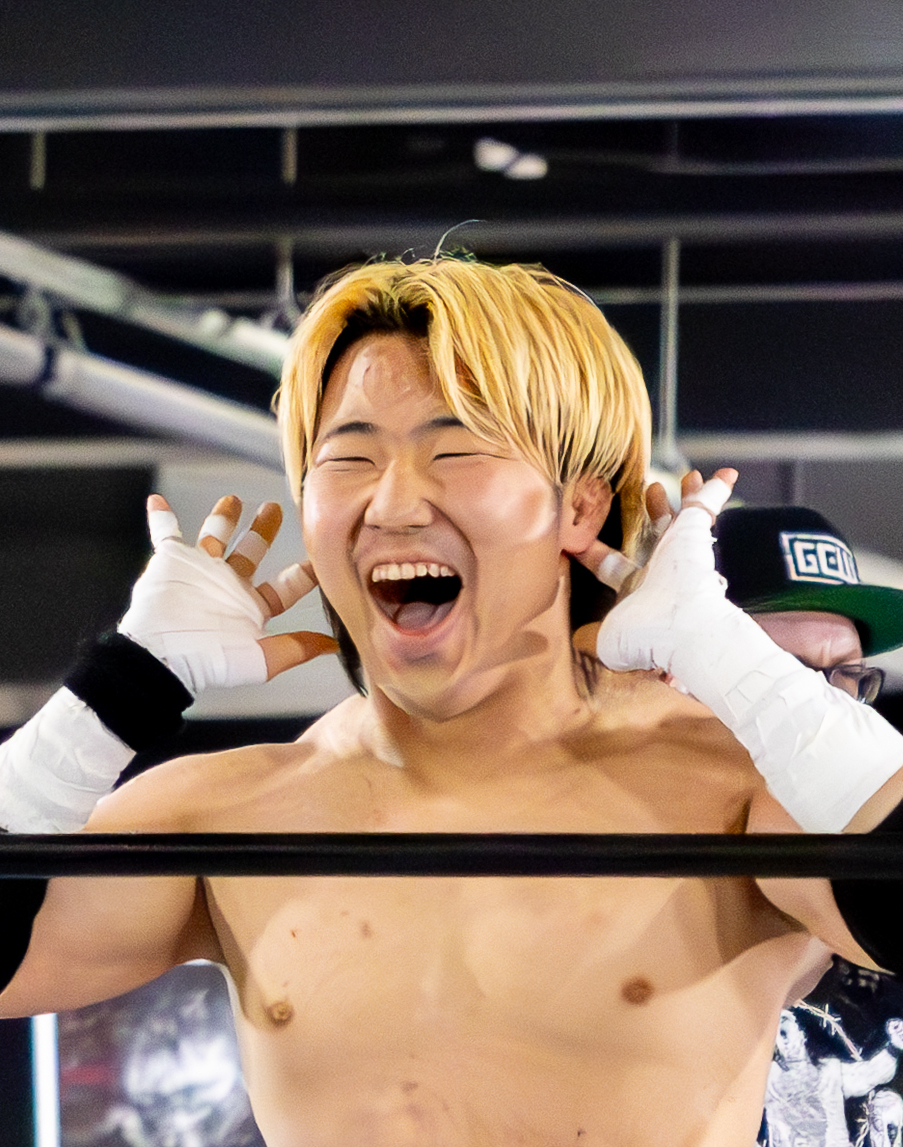
- Wakamatsu in June 2025

Personal information
- Born: Daiki Wakamatsu; 24 July 1998 (age 28) Aizuwakamatsu, Japan

Professional wrestling career
- Ring name: Daiju Wakamatsu
- Billed height: 176 cm (5 ft 9 in)
- Billed weight: 81 kg (179 lb)
- Debut: 2019

Daiki Wakamatsu, better known by his ring name Daiju Wakamatsu (若松大樹, Wakamatsu Daiju), is a Japanese professional wrestler signed to Active Advance Pro Wrestling (2AW), where he is a former one-time 2AW Openweight Champion. He has also wrestled in events held by the Big Japan Pro Wrestling (BJW) and Pro Wrestling Freedoms wrestling promotions.

== Professional wrestling career ==
=== Active Advance Pro Wrestling (2019–present) ===
Wakamatsu made his professional wrestling debut in Active Advance Pro Wrestling on November 10, 2019 at the Grand Slam in TKP Garden City Chiba, where he defeated Naka Shuma in singles competition.

During his time with the promotion, Wakamatsu competed alongside Taishi Takizawa as part of a tag team called "Buttobe Missile Kickers". He and Takizawa are two-time 2AW Tag Team Champions; the pair won the title for the first time at 2AW Grand Slam In 2AW Square on April 23, 2023, by defeating Koen (Takuro Niki and Tatsuya Hanami) On October 27, 2024, Wakamatsu and Takizawa defeated Starlight Dreamers (Ayame Sasamura and Kotaro Yoshino) to win the title for the second time. At the 2AW 6th Anniversary event on June 22, 2025, Wakamatsu defeated Naka Shuma to win the 2AW Openweight Championship.

=== Big Japan Pro Wrestling (2020–present) ===
Wakamatsu competes in Big Japan Pro Wrestling as a developmental talent, and has participated in several deathmatches and title chase storylines. At 2AW/BJW Big Advance on March 12, 2023, he teamed up with Abdullah Kobayashi and Kankuro Hoshino to defeat Chicharito Shoki, Yasufumi Nakanoue and Yuji Okabayashi for the Yokohama Shopping Street 6-Man Tag Team Championship. At BJW New Standard Big "B" on October 22, 2023, he unsuccessfully challenged Yuki Ishikawa for the BJW Deathmatch Heavyweight Championship. At BJW In Korakuen Hall on January 27, 2024, Wakamatsu joined Ishikawa to unsuccessfully challenge the Crazy Lovers (Masashi Takeda and Takumi Tsukamoto) for the BJW Tag Team Championship.

Wakamatsu has competed in several of the promotion's signature events, including the Saikyo Tag League, where he made his first appearance in 2022. He and Abdullah Kobayashi won the tournament after finishing as runners-up in the B block of the competition, scoring a total of twelve points against the teams of Masashi Takeda and Takumi Tsukamoto, Shigehiro Irie and Yuya Aoki, Daichi Hashimoto and Hideyoshi Kamitani, Chicharito Shoki and Yuji Okabayashi, Michio Kageyama and Yusaku Ito, Kazuki Hashimoto and Satsuki Nagao, Kankuro Hoshino and Yuichi Taniguchi, and the Brahman Brothers (Brahman Kei and Brahman Shu). Wakamatsu and Kobayashi defeated Irie and Aoki in the quarterfinals, then outmatched Hiroyuki Suzuki and Takuho Kato in the semifinals and Masashi Takeda and Takumi Tsukamoto in the finals.

Wakamatsu has also participated in the Ikkitousen Deathmatch Survivor hardcore tournament; in his 2024 debut appearance, he finished atop the B-block with six points after defeating Dale Patricks, Yuki Ishikawa, Ryuji Ito and Beastman. He subsequently lost to Hideyoshi Kamitani in the finals of the event.

== Championships and accomplishments ==
- Active Advance Pro Wrestling
  - 2AW Openweight Championship (1 time)
  - 2AW Tag Team Championship (2 times) – with Taishi Takizawa
  - One Day Tournament (2021)
- Big Japan Pro Wrestling
  - Yokohama Shopping Street 6-Man Tag Team Championship (1 time) – with Abdullah Kobayashi and Kankuro Hoshino
  - Saikyo Tag League (2022) – with Abdullah Kobayashi
- Japan Indie Awards
  - Newcomer Award (2022)
