= Takuya Nomura =

Japanese professional wrestler

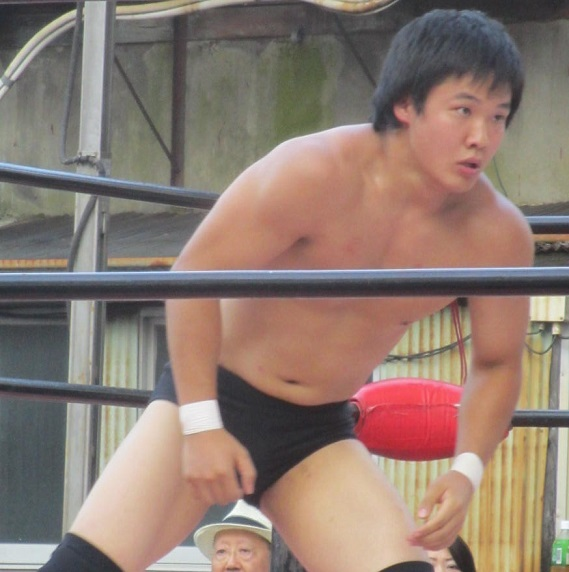
- Nomura in August 2016

Personal information
- Born: October 26, 1993 (age 33) Utsunomiya, Tochigi, Japan

Professional wrestling career
- Ring name: Takuya Nomura
- Billed height: 1.76 m (5 ft 9 in)
- Billed weight: 92 kg (203 lb)
- Trained by: Hideki Suzuki; Kazuki Hashimoto
- Debut: 2016

Takuya Nomura (野村卓矢, Nomura Takuya) is a Japanese professional wrestler. He is currently working as a freelancer, but is temporarily retired due to kidney failure. He is best known for his tenure with the professional wrestling promotions Big Japan Pro Wrestling (BJW) and Pro Wrestling Zero1 (Zero1).

== Professional wrestling career ==
=== Independent circuit (2016–present) ===
Nomura is known for his tenures with various promotions. He participated at the Lion's Gate Project, a developmental branch of professional wrestling promotion New Japan Pro-Wrestling (NJPW) which hosted its sixth event on June 15, 2017, where he teamed up with Dinosaur Takuma in a losing effort to Hiroyoshi Tenzan and Tiger Mask. At the Toshiwasure! Shuffle Tag Tournament 2020, a one-night event promoted by DDT Pro Wrestling (DDT) in partnership with BJW, Nomura teamed up with Konosuke Takeshita and obtained a victory over the team of Akira Hyodo and Makoto Oishi, but fell short to Harashima and Yuji Okabayashi in the semi-finals.

==== All Japan Pro Wrestling (2016–2021) ====
Nomura made sporadic appearances in All Japan Pro Wrestling (AJPW). At AJPW AJ Phoenix Vol. 5, on October 25, 2016, he teamed up with Kazumi Kikuta and defeated NEXTREAM (Naoya Nomura and Yuma Aoyagi). On the first night of the AJPW New Year Wars 2021, on January 2, he teamed up with Fuminori Abe as Astronauts and defeated Ikuto Hidaka and Koji Iwamoto.

==== Pro Wrestling Noah (2017) ====
Nomura participated in the N-1 Victory event of Pro Wrestling Noah (Noah), marking appearances in several tag team matches outside of the proper tournament. On the twelfth night from November 11, 2017, he teamed up with Daisuke Sekimoto in a losing effort to Naomichi Marufuji and Takashi Sugiura. Three nights later, on November 14, he teamed up again with Sekimoto, this time falling short to Sugiura and Go Shiozaki.

==== Big Japan Pro Wrestling (2016–present) ====
Nomura made his professional wrestling debut in Big Japan Pro Wrestling (BJW), on the third night of the 2016 edition of the Ikkitousen Strong Climb tournament which took place on March 19, 2016, where he went in a time-limit draw against Toshiyuki Sakuda in an exhibition match. On a house show from February 23, 2021, Nomura and his Astronauts tag team partner Fuminori Abe recaptured the BJW Tag Team Championship from Kazumi Kikuta and Ryuichi Kawakami.

Nomura participated in several signature events promoted by BJW, such as the Saikyo Tag League, making his first appearance at the 2016 edition, where he teamed up with Hideki Suzuki, placing themselves in the Strong Style Block, finishing with no points after competing against the teams of Kohei Sato and Shuji Ishikawa, Daisuke Sekimoto and Yuji Okabayashi, and Speed Of Sounds (Tsutomu Oosugi and Hercules Senga). Two years later, at the 2018 edition of the event, he teamed up with his Astronauts tag team partner Fuminori Abe, placing themselves in the Strong Style Block, scoring a total of four points after competing against the teams of Ryota Hama and Yasufumi Nakanoue, Daichi Hashimoto and Hideyoshi Kamitani, Ryuichi Kawakami and Kazumi Kikuta, Tatsuhiko Yoshino and Kota Sekifuda, Hideki Suzuki and Daisuke Sekimoto, and Kazuki Hashimoto and Yuya Aoki.

He took part in other sporadic tournaments of the promotion, such as the BJW Junior Heavyweight Championship Tournament from 2017, where he finished the block with a total of four points after competing against Kazuki Hashimoto, Shinobu, Tatsuhiko Yoshino, Toshiyuki Sakuda and Yuya Aoki. The event determined the inaugural BJW Junior Heavyweight Champion.

Nomura made his first appearance in the Ikkitousen Strong Climb event, at the 2018 edition, where he placed himself in the Block A, and scoring a total of two points after competing against Daichi Hashimoto, Yasufumi Nakanoue, Ryota Hama, Hideyoshi Kamitani and Yuya Aoki.

== Championships and accomplishments ==
- All Japan Pro Wrestling

- World Tag Team Championship (1 time) – with Kento Miyahara
- World's Strongest Tag Determination League (2022) – with Kento Miyahara
- January 2 Korakuen Hall New Year Battle Royal (2023)

- Big Japan Pro Wrestling

- BJW World Strong Heavyweight Championship (1 time)
- BJW Tag Team Championship (3 times) – with Fuminori Abe
- Yokohama Shopping Street 6-Man Tag Team Championship (1 time) – with Hideki Suzuki and Yoshihisa Uto
- Super Hot One Day Tag Tournament (2024) – with Abdullah Kobayashi

- DDT Pro-Wrestling

- KO-D Tag Team Championship (1 time) – with Fuminori Abe

- Toshikoshi Puroresu

- Toshiwasure! Shuffle Tag Tournament (2019) – with Tetsuya Endo

- Japan Indie Awards

- Best Bout Award (2021) vs. Daisuke Sekimoto on October 18
- Newcomer Award (2016)

- Capture International

- Capture International Championship (1 time)

- Pro-Wrestling Basara

- Iron Fist Tag Team Championship (2 times) – with Fuminori Abe

- Pro Wrestling Illustrated

- Ranked No. 350 of the top 500 singles wrestlers in the PWI 500 in 2017

- TTT Pro-Wrestling

- TTT Indie Unified Six-Man Tag Team Championship (1 time) – with Fuminori Abe and Ippanjin Munenori Sawa

- Wrestling Observer Newsletter

- Ranked No. 5 of the top 10 Rookie of the Year wrestlers in 2016
