= BJW World Strong Heavyweight Championship =

Professional wrestling championship

- Current design of the BJW World Strong Heavyweight Championship (2012 – present)

Details
- Promotion: Big Japan Pro Wrestling
- Date established: April 14, 2012
- Current champion: Kazumasa Yoshida
- Date won: April 29, 2026

Other name
- BJW Strong World Heavyweight Championship
Statistics
- First champion: Yoshihito Sasaki
- Most reigns: Daisuke Sekimoto; Yuji Okabayashi (4 reigns)
- Longest reign: Yuya Aoki (529 days)
- Shortest reign: Manabu Soya (58 days)
- Oldest champion: Kohei Sato (41 years, 11 months and 4 days)
- Youngest champion: Hideyoshi Kamitani (24 years, 5 months and 26 days)
- Heaviest champion: Shuji Ishikawa (130 kg (290 lb))
- Lightest champion: Shinya Ishikawa (94 kg (207 lb))

The BJW World Strong Heavyweight Championship (BJW認定世界ストロングヘビー級王座, BJW nintei sekai sutorongu hebī-kyū ōza) is a professional wrestling world heavyweight championship owned by the Japanese Big Japan Pro Wrestling (BJW) promotion. It is one of two heavyweight championships promoted by BJW, the other being the BJW Deathmatch Heavyweight Championship. The two titles symbolize the two sides of BJW; the Deathmatch Heavyweight Championship the hardcore wrestling side and the World Strong Heavyweight Championship the strong style side. The title has a lower weight limit of 96 kg (212 lb). Like most professional wrestling championships, the title is won as a result of a scripted match. There have been nineteen reigns shared among eleven different wrestlers. Kazumasa Yoshida is the current champion in his first reign.

== History ==
On March 26, 2012, Yoshihito Sasaki defeated Daisuke Sekimoto in the finals to win the 2012 Ikkitosen Strong Climb tournament. Following his win, Sasaki requested that BJW establish a new championship that would symbolize the "strong" side of the promotion. BJW already had one heavyweight championship, the BJW Deathmatch Heavyweight Championship, but it was contested exclusively in deathmatches. This led to BJW announcing the creation of the BJW World Strong Heavyweight Championship on April 14, 2012. A similar championship in concept existed from 2001 known as the BJW Heavyweight Championship but had long been retired, with Men's Teioh last defending the title in 2004. On May 5, Yoshihito Sasaki defeated Westside Xtreme Wrestling (wXw) representative and the reigning wXw Unified World Wrestling Champion Big Van Walter in a decision match to become the inaugural champion. The BJW World Strong Heavyweight Championship was first defended outside of Japan on May 19 at a wXw event. The championship has also been defended at All Japan Pro Wrestling and Pro Wrestling Zero1 events.

With the introduction of the BJW Junior Heavyweight Championship in May 2017, BJW announced that from now on wrestlers need to weigh at least 96 kg (212 lb) to be able to challenge for the BJW World Strong Heavyweight Championship.

== Title history ==
Key
No.	Overall reign number
Reign	Reign number for the specific champion
Days	Number of days held
Defenses	Number of successful defenses
(NLT)	Championship change took place "no later than" the date listed
+	Current reign is changing daily

No.	Champion	Championship change			Reign statistics			Notes	Ref.
No.	Champion	Date	Event	Location	Reign	Days	Defenses	Notes	Ref.
1	Yoshihito Sasaki	May 5, 2012	Endless Survivor	Yokohama, Japan	1	242	5	Defeated Big Van Walter in a decision match to become the inaugural champion.	
2	Manabu Soya	January 2, 2013	House show	Tokyo, Japan	1	58	1		
3	Daisuke Sekimoto	March 1, 2013	House show	Tokyo, Japan	1	323	10		
—	Vacated	January 18, 2014	—	—	—	—	—	Vacated due to a knee injury.	
4	Shinya Ishikawa	February 7, 2014	House show	Tokyo, Japan	1	222	2	Defeated Ryuichi Kawakami in a decision match to win the vacant title.	
—	Vacated	September 17, 2014	—	—	—	—	—	Vacated due to Ishikawa retiring from professional wrestling.	
5	Shuji Ishikawa	December 21, 2014	Big Japan Death Vegas 2014	Yokohama, Japan	1	100	1	Defeated Ryuichi Kawakami in a decision match to win the vacant title.	
6	Daisuke Sekimoto	March 31, 2015	Ikkitousen Deathmatch Survivor 2015	Tokyo, Japan	2	111	1		
7	Yuji Okabayashi	July 20, 2015	Ryōgokutan 2015	Tokyo, Japan	1	370	3		
8	Hideyoshi Kamitani	July 24, 2016	Ryōgokutan 2016	Tokyo, Japan	1	147	2		
9	Daisuke Sekimoto	December 18, 2016	Big Japan Death Vegas 2016	Yokohama, Japan	3	102	2		
10	Hideki Suzuki	March 30, 2017	Ikkitousen Deathmatch Survivor 2017	Tokyo, Japan	1	262	5		
11	Daichi Hashimoto	December 17, 2017	Big Japan Death Vegas 2017	Yokohama, Japan	1	119	2		
12	Hideki Suzuki	April 15, 2018	Sapporo 2 Days	Sapporo, Japan	2	210	5		
13	Daisuke Sekimoto	November 11, 2018	Ryōgokutan 2018	Tokyo, Japan	4	175	3		
14	Yuji Okabayashi	May 5, 2019	Endless Survivor 2019	Yokohama, Japan	2	112	2		
15	Kohei Sato	August 25, 2019	Death Mania VII	Nagoya, Japan	1	71	1		
16	Daichi Hashimoto	November 4, 2019	Ryōgokutan 2019	Tokyo, Japan	2	352	6		
17	Yuji Okabayashi	October 21, 2020	BJW Death Match, Strong & Junior 3 Major Title Matches	Tokyo, Japan	3	73	2		
18	Yasufumi Nakanoue	January 2, 2021	BJW 2021 New Year	Tokyo, Japan	1	261	6		
19	Takuya Nomura	September 20, 2021	BJW New Standard Big B ~ The Day When Thank You Explodes ~ 113 Times In Sapporo	Sapporo, Japan	1	104	3		
20	Yuji Okabayashi	January 2, 2022	BJW New Year 2022	Tokyo, Japan	4	487	8		
21	Yuya Aoki	May 4, 2023	BJW Endless Survivor: Infinity Independent	Yokohama, Japan	1	529	11		
22	Hideyoshi Kamitani	October 14, 2024	BJW New Standard Big "B" ~ Keep Rolling	Yokohama, Japan	2	203	1		
23	Daichi Hashimoto	May 5, 2025	BJW 30th Anniversary ~ Dainichi Spirit	Yokohama, Japan	3	161	3		
24	So Daimonji	October 13, 2025	BJW New Standard Big "B" ~ I & Belive	Sapporo, Japan	1	198	5		
25	Kazumasa Yoshida	April 29, 2026	BJW Big Japan 31 Beyond The Survivor	Yokohama, Japan	1	207+	2		

== Combined reigns ==
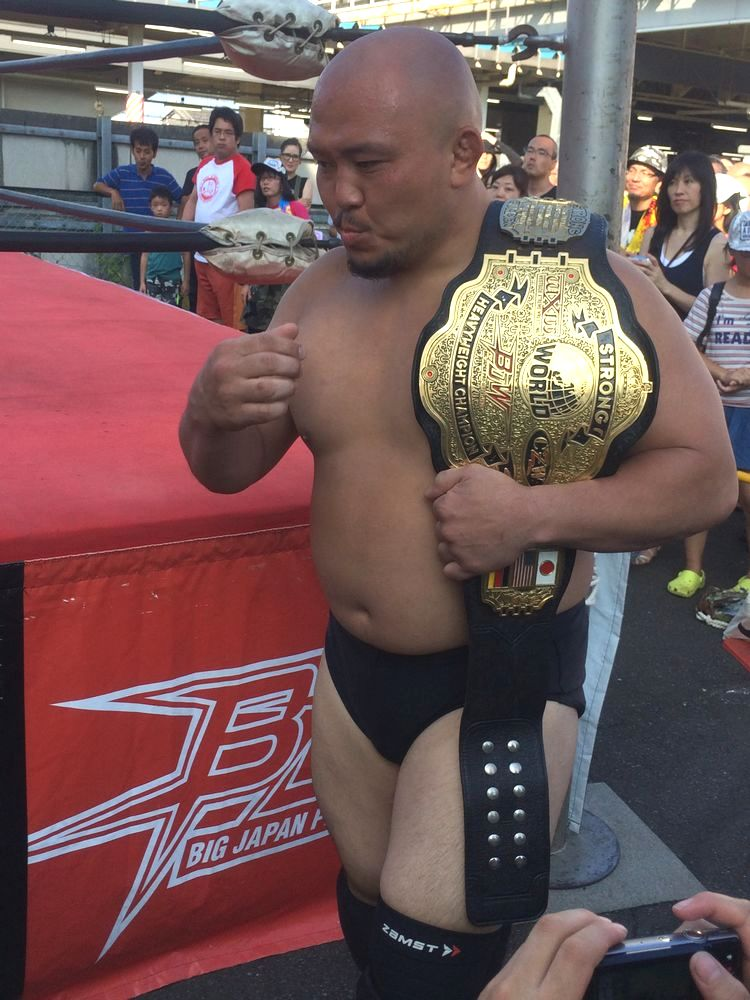
Record tying four-time and longest combined reigning champion at 1,042 days, Yuji Okabayashi.

As of November 22, 2026

†	Indicates the current champion

Rank	Wrestler	No. of reigns	Combined defenses	Combined days
1	Yuji Okabayashi	4	15	1,042
2	Daisuke Sekimoto	4	15	711
3	Daichi Hashimoto	3	11	632
4	Yuya Aoki	1	11	529
5	Hideki Suzuki	2	10	472
6	Hideyoshi Kamitani	2	3	350
7	Yasufumi Nakanoue	1	6	261
8	Yoshihito Sasaki	1	5	242
9	Shinya Ishikawa	1	2	222
10	So Daimonji	1	5	198
11	Kazumasa Yoshida †	1	2	207+
12	Takuya Nomura	1	3	104
13	Shuji Ishikawa	1	1	100
14	Kohei Sato	1	1	71
15	Manabu Soya	1	1	58

== See also ==
- Big Japan Pro Wrestling
- BJW Deathmatch Heavyweight Championship
- BJW Heavyweight Championship
