= Saikyo Tag League =

- Promotions: Big Japan Pro Wrestling
- Nicknames: Saikyo Tag League (1999–2009, 2013–present); Big Japan Tag League (2011–2013)
- First event: 1999

Saikyo Tag League (最侠タッグリーグ, Saikyō Taggu Rīgu; lit. "Maximum Tag League") is a professional wrestling round-robin hardcore tag team tournament annually held by Big Japan Pro Wrestling (BJW), considered a spin-off of New Japan Pro-Wrestling's World Tag League and All Japan Pro Wrestling's World's Strongest Tag Determination League. The tournament was established in 1999 as Saikyo Tag League and then renamed as Big Japan Tag League in 2011 before returning to its old name Saikyo Tag League in 2014. A new format was introduced in 2014 in which the teams were divided into two blocks, "Strong Style Block" and "Deathmatch Block". The strong style block consists of normal tag team matches and deathmatch block consists of matches contested under deathmatch rules.

The Saikyo Tag League is held under a points system, with 2 points for a win, 1 for a draw and 0 for a loss. Top four teams advance to the semifinals in the knockout format and then the winning teams compete in the finals.

== List of winners ==
Tournament	Year	Winners (total won as an individual)	Total won as a team	Reference
Saikyo Tag League	1999	Tomoaki Honma and Ryuji Yamakawa	1	
Saikyo Tag League	2000	Tomoaki Honma and Ryuji Yamakawa (2)	2	
Saikyo Tag League	2001	Men's Teioh and Daisuke Sekimoto	1	
Saikyo Tag League	2002	Men's Teioh and Daisuke Sekimoto (2)	2	
Saikyo Tag League	2003	Daikokubo Benkei and Abdullah Kobayashi	1	
Saikyo Tag League	2009	Masashi Takeda and Isami Kodaka	1	
Big Japan Tag League	2011	Daisuke Sekimoto (3) and Yuji Okabayashi	1	
Big Japan Tag League	2012	Isami Kodaka (2) and Yuko Miyamoto	1	
Big Japan Tag League	2013	Isami Kodaka (3) and Yuko Miyamoto (2)	2	
Saikyo Tag League	2014	Isami Kodaka (4) and Yuko Miyamoto (3)	3	
Saikyo Tag League	2015	Daisuke Sekimoto (4) and Yuji Okabayashi (2)	2	
Saikyo Tag League	2016	Daisuke Sekimoto (5) and Yuji Okabayashi (3)	3	
Saikyo Tag League	2017	Daichi Hashimoto and Hideyoshi Kamitani	1	
Saikyo Tag League	2018	Ryota Hama and Yasufumi Nakanoue	1	
Saikyo Tag League	2019	Yuji Okabayashi (4) and Shigehiro Irie	1	
Saikyo Tag League	2020	Daichi Hashimoto (2) and Hideyoshi Kamitani (2)	2	
Saikyo Tag League	2022	Abdullah Kobayashi (2) and Daiju Wakamatsu	1	

== Tournament history ==
=== 1999 ===
The 1999 Saikyo Tag League was the first edition of the tournament which featured four teams in one block. The tournament was held between October 27 and November 8, 1999.

Final standings
Ryuji Yamakawa and Tomoaki Honma	6
Shadow WX and The Winger	4
Kamikaze and Shunme Matsuzaki	2
Jun Kasai and Mike Samples	0

Results	Kasai Samples	Kamikaze Matsuzuki	Yamakawa Honma	WX Winger
Kasai Samples	—N/a	Kamikaze; Matsuzuki (25:08)	Yamakawa; Honma (16:30)	WX; Winger (15:25)
Kamikaze Matsuzuki	Kamikaze; Matsuzuki (25:08)	—N/a	Yamakawa; Honma (19:14)	WX; Winger (29:43)
Yamakawa Honma	Yamakawa; Honma (16:30)	Yamakawa; Honma (19:14)	—N/a	Yamakawa; Honma (19:55)
WX Winger	WX; Winger (15:25)	WX; Winger (29:43)	Yamakawa; Honma (19:55)	—N/a

=== 2000 ===
The 2000 Saikyo Tag League featured a new format as it had eight teams divided into two blocks with four teams in each block. The tournament was held between September 17 and October 30, 2000.

Final standings
Block A		Block B	
Abdullah the Butcher and Shadow WX	6	Ryuji Yamakawa and Tomoaki Honma	6
Daisuke Sekimoto and Men's Teioh	4	Jun Kasai and Zandig	4
Daikokubō Benkei and Shunme Matsuzaki	2	Justice Pain and Wifebeater	2
Abdullah Kobayashi and Kamikaze	0	Mad Man Pondo and Mitch Page	0

Block A	Abdullah WX	Kobayashi Kamikaze	Benkei Matsuzaki	Sekimoto Teioh
Abdullah WX	—N/a	Abdullah; WX (11:04)	Abdullah; WX (8:58)	Abdullah; WX (14:56)
Kobayashi Kamikaze	Abdullah; WX (11:04)	—N/a	Benkei; Matsuzaki (19:35)	Sekimoto; Teioh (18:37)
Benkei Matsuzaki	Abdullah; WX (8:58)	Benkei; Matsuzaki (19:35)	—N/a	Sekimoto; Teioh (11:57)
Sekimoto Teioh	Abdullah; WX (14:56)	Sekimoto; Teioh (18:37)	Sekimoto; Teioh (11:57)	—N/a
Block B	Kasai Zandig	Pain Wifebeater	Pondo Page	Yamakawa Honma
Kasai Zandig	—N/a	Kasai; Zandig (9:38)	Kasai; Zandig (8:51)	Yamakawa; Honma (14:32)
Pain Wifebeater	Kasai; Zandig (9:38)	—N/a	Pain; Wifebeater (13:24)	Yamakawa; Honma (13:09)
Pondo Page	Kasai; Zandig (8:51)	Pain; Wifebeater (13:24)	—N/a	Yamakawa; Honma (16:28)
Yamakawa Honma	Yamakawa; Honma (14:32)	Yamakawa; Honma (13:09)	Yamakawa; Honma (16:28)	—N/a

Semifinals
A1	Abdullah the Butcher and Shadow WX	Pin
B2	Jun Kasai and Zandig	7:49
B1	Ryuji Yamakawa and Tomoaki Honma	Pin
A2	Daisuke Sekimoto and Men's Teioh	16:55

Finals
B2	Jun Kasai and Zandig	Pin
B1	Ryuji Yamakawa and Tomoaki Honma	8:54

=== 2001 ===
The 2001 Saikyo Tag League consisted of one block with five teams and was held between September 11 and September 23, 2001.

Final standings
Daisuke Sekimoto and Men's Teioh	6
Hideki Hosaka and Kamikaze	5
Abdullah Kobayashi and Daikokubō Benkei	5
Masato Tanaka and Shunme Matsuzaki	4
Fantastik and Ryuji Ito	0

Results	Kobayashi Benkei	Fantasik Ito	Hosaka Kamikaze	Tanaka Matsuzaki	Sekimoto Teioh
Kobayashi Benkei	—N/a	Kobayashi; Benkei (15:30)	Draw (30:00)	Kobayashi; Benkei (15:48)	Sekimoto; Teioh (15:04)
Fantasik Ito	Kobayashi; Benkei (15:30)	—N/a	Hosaka; Kamikaze (18:21)	Tanaka; Matsuzaki (20:04)	Sekimoto; Teioh (13:30)
Hosaka Kamikaze	Draw (30:00)	Hosaka; Kamikaze (18:21)	—N/a	Tanaka; Matsuzaki (17:05)	Hosaka; Kamikaze (18:55)
Tanaka Matsuzaki	Kobayashi; Benkei (15:48)	Tanaka; Matsuzaki (20:04)	Tanaka; Matsuzaki (17:05)	—N/a	Sekimoto; Teioh (16:35)
Sekimoto Teioh	Sekimoto; Teioh (15:04)	Sekimoto; Teioh (13:30)	Hosaka; Kamikaze (18:55)	Sekimoto; Teioh (16:35)	—N/a

=== 2002 ===
The 2002 Saikyo Tag League consisted of total ten teams and two blocks with five teams in each block. The tournament was held between October 8 and October 31, 2002.

Final standings
Block A		Block B	
Daisuke Sekimoto and Men's Teioh	8	Homicide and ODD	6
Shadow WX and The Winger	6	Daisaku Shimoda and Ryuji Ito	5
Great Kojika and Ryuji Yamakawa	4	Abdullah Kobayashi and Daikokubō Benkei	5
Gosaku and Kintaro Kanemura	2	Mafia and Monster Mack	4
2 Tuff Tony and Mad Man Pondo	0	Bancho Matsuzaki and Jaki Numazawa	0

Block A	Tony Pondo	Sekimoto Teioh	Gosaku Kanemura	Kojika Yamakawa	WX Winger
Tony Pondo	—N/a	Sekimoto; Teioh (14:42)	Gosaku; Kanemura (16:04)	Kojika; Yamakawa (16:10)	WX; Winger (17:56)
Sekimoto Teioh	Sekimoto; Teioh (14:42)	—N/a	Sekimoto; Teioh (15:40)	Sekimoto; Teioh (15:36)	Sekimoto; Teioh (13:04)
Gosaku Kanemura	Gosaku; Kanemura (16:04)	Sekimoto; Teioh (15:40)	—N/a	Kojika; Yamakawa (14:13)	WX; Winger (15:02)
Kojika Yamakawa	Kojika; Yamakawa (16:10)	Sekimoto; Teioh (15:36)	Kojika; Yamakawa (14:13)	—N/a	WX; Winger (15:23)
WX Winger	WX; Winger (17:56)	Sekimoto; Teioh (13:04)	WX; Winger (15:02)	WX; Winger (15:23)	—N/a
Block B	Kobayashi Benkei	Matsuzaki Numazawa	Shimoda Ito	Homicide ODD	Mafia Mack
Kobayashi Benkei	—N/a	Kobayashi; Benkei (14:53)	Draw (20:00)	Homicide; ODD (17:31)	Kobayashi; Benkei (14:47)
Matsuzaki Numazawa	Kobayashi; Benkei (14:53)	—N/a	Shimoda; Ito (14:32)	Homicide; ODD (12:24)	Mafia; Mack (9:51)
Shimoda Ito	Draw (20:00)	Shimoda; Ito (14:32)	—N/a	Homicide; ODD (13:10)	Shimoda; Ito (11:34)
Homicide ODD	Homicide; ODD (17:31)	Homicide; ODD (12:24)	Homicide; ODD (13:10)	—N/a	Mafia; Mack (17:24)
Mafia Mack	Kobayashi; Benkei (14:47)	Mafia; Mack (9:51)	Shimoda; Ito (11:34)	Mafia; Mack (17:24)	—N/a

Block B Second Place Decision
Daisaku Shimoda and Ryuji Ito	Pin
Abdullah Kobayashi and Daikokubō Benkei	13:36

Semifinals
A1	Daisuke Sekimoto and Men's Teioh	Pin
B2	Ryuji Ito and Daisaku Shimoda	14:41
A2	Shadow WX and The Winger	Pin
B1	Homicide and ODD	13:10

Finals
A1	Daisuke Sekimoto and Men's Teioh	Pin
B1	Homicide and ODD	13:57

=== 2003 ===
The 2003 Saikyo Tag League consisted of one block with five teams and was held between October 8 and November 8, 2003.

Final standings
Abdullah Kobayashi and Daikokubō Benkei	6
2 Tuff Tony and Daisuke Sekimoto	6
Men's Teioh and Mr. Big Japan	4
Mad Man Pondo and Shadow WX	2
Hiroyuki Kondo and Katsumasa Inoue	2

Results	Tony Sekimoto	Kobayashi Benkei	Kondo Inoue	Teioh Japan	Pondo WX
Tony Sekimoto	—N/a	Kobayashi; Benkei (17:57)	Tony; Sekimoto (20:11)	Tony; Sekimoto (17:15)	Tony; Sekimoto (15:32)
Kobayashi Benkei	Kobayashi; Benkei (17:57)	—N/a	Kondo; Inoue (20:36)	Kobayashi; Benkei (16:01)	Kobayashi; Benkei (14:03)
Kondo Inoue	Tony; Sekimoto (20:11)	Kondo; Inoue (20:36)	—N/a	Teioh; Japan (17:15)	Pondo; WX (20:05)
Teioh Japan	Tony; Sekimoto (17:15)	Kobayashi; Benkei (16:01)	Teioh; Japan (17:15)	—N/a	Teioh; Japan (12:31)
Pondo WX	Tony; Sekimoto (15:32)	Kobayashi; Benkei (14:03)	Pondo; WX (20:05)	Teioh; Japan (12:31)	—N/a

Finalist Decision		Finals
		Abdullah Kobayashi and Daikokubō Benkei	Pin
Men's Teioh and Mr. Big Japan	Pin	Men's Teioh and Mr. Big Japan	17:02
2 Tuff Tony and Daisuke Sekimoto	18:28

=== 2009 ===
The 2009 Saikyo Tag League was the sixth edition of the tournament which marked the return of the tournament after a six-year hiatus. It was held between February 13 and May 28, 2009.

Final standings
Block A		Block B	
Daisuke Sekimoto and Mammoth Sasaki/Masato Tanaka^{1}	6	Isami Kodaka and Masashi Takeda	6
Ryuji Ito and Shuji Ishikawa	5	Takashi Sasaki and Yuko Miyamoto	6
Shadow WX and The Winger	4	Shinya Ishikawa and Yoshihito Sasaki	4
Abdullah Kobayashi and Masada	4	Jaki Numazawa and Jun Kasai	2
Atsushi Ohashi and Yuji Okabayashi	0	Kankuro Hoshino and Katsumasa Inoue	2

Block A	Kobayashi Masada	Ohashi Okabayashi	Sekimoto Sasaki/Tanaka	Ito Shuji	WX Winger
Kobayashi Masada	—N/a	Kobayashi; Masada (14:56)	Sekimoto; Tanaka (16:45)	Kobayashi; Masada (15:53)	WX; Winger (18:37)
Ohashi Okabayashi	Kobayashi; Masada (14:56)	—N/a	Sekimoto; Tanaka (16:19)	Ito; Shuji (15:46)	WX; Winger (7:35)
Sekimoto Sasaki/Tanaka	Sekimoto; Tanaka (16:45)	Sekimoto; Tanaka (16:19)	—N/a	Draw (30:00)	Sekimoto; Tanaka (14:12)
Ito Shuji	Kobayashi; Masada (15:53)	Ito; Shuji (15:46)	Draw (30:00)	—N/a	Ito; Shuji (15:53)
WX Winger	WX; Winger (18:37)	WX; Winger (7:35)	Sekimoto; Tanaka (14:12)	Ito; Shuji (15:53)	—N/a
Block B	Kodaka Takeda	Numazawa Kasai	Hoshino Inoue	Shinya Y. Sasaki	T. Sasaki Miyamoto
Kodaka Takeda	—N/a	Kodaka; Takeda (forfeit)	Kodaka; Takeda (14:10)	Shinya; Y. Sasaki (13:48)	Kodaka; Takeda (21:13)
Numazawa Kasai	Kodaka; Takeda (forfeit)	—N/a	Numazawa; Kasai (15:04)	Shinya; Y. Sasaki (forfeit)	T. Sasaki; Miyamoto (21:47)
Hoshino Inoue	Kodaka; Takeda (14:10)	Numazawa; Kasai (15:04)	—N/a	Hoshino; Inoue (11:58)	T. Sasaki; Miyamoto (18:18)
Shinya Y. Sasaki	Shinya; Y. Sasaki (13:48)	Shinya; Y. Sasaki (forfeit)	Hoshino; Inoue (11:58)	—N/a	T. Sasaki; Miyamoto (12:47)
T. Sasaki Miyamoto	Kodaka; Takeda (21:13)	T. Sasaki; Miyamoto (21:47)	T. Sasaki; Miyamoto (18:18)	T. Sasaki; Miyamoto (12:47)	—N/a

Semifinals
A1	Daisuke Sekimoto and Masato Tanaka	Pin
B2	Takashi Sasaki and Yuko Miyamoto	22:24
A2	Ryuji Ito and Shuji Ishikawa	Pin
B1	Isami Kodaka and Masashi Takeda	17:10

Finals
B2	Takashi Sasaki and Yuko Miyamoto	Pin
B1	Isami Kodaka and Masashi Takeda	35:35^{2}

1 Masato Tanaka was a replacement for the injured Mammoth Sasaki.
2 The match initially ended in a draw due to the time limit expiring but was immediately restarted.

=== 2011 ===
The 2011 Big Japan Tag League was held between September 19 and November 22, 2011.

Final standings
Block A		Block B	
Jaki Numazawa and Jun Kasai	8	Brahman Shu and Brahman Kei	8
Daisuke Sekimoto and Yuji Okabayashi	7	Isami Kodaka and Yuko Miyamoto	8
Abdullah Kobayashi and Masashi Takeda	6	Masada and Ryuji Ito	6
Michael Dante and Tommy End	6	Shinobu and Yoshihito Sasaki	6
Kankuro Hoshino and Shadow WX	2	Devon Moore and Rory Mondo	2
Ryuichi Kawakami and Shinya Ishikawa	1	Masato Inaba and Takashi Sasaki	0

Block A	Kobayashi Takeda	Sekimoto Okabayashi	Numazawa Kasai	Hoshino WX	Dante End	Kawakami Ishikawa
Kobayashi Takeda	—N/a	Sekimoto; Okabayashi (19:51)	Kobayashi; Takeda (17:43)	Kobayashi; Takeda (11:44)	Dante; End (14:37)	Kobayashi; Takeda (8:28)
Sekimoto Okabayashi	Sekimoto; Okabayashi (19:51)	—N/a	Numazawa; Kasai (19:55)	Sekimoto; Okabayashi (16:04)	Sekimoto; Okabayashi (19:24)	Draw (30:00)
Numazawa Kasai	Kobayashi; Takeda (17:43)	Numazawa; Kasai (19:55)	—N/a	Numazawa; Kasai (15:37)	Numazawa; Kasai (13:05)	Numazawa; Kasai (16:39)
Hoshino WX	Kobayashi; Takeda (11:44)	Sekimoto; Okabayashi (16:04)	Numazawa; Kasai (15:37)	—N/a	Dante; End (11:07)	Hoshino; WX (11:17)
Dante End	Dante; End (14:37)	Sekimoto; Okabayashi (19:24)	Numazawa; Kasai (13:05)	Dante; End (11:07)	—N/a	Dante; End (13:28)
Kawakami Ishikawa	Kobayashi; Takeda (8:28)	Draw (30:00)	Numazawa; Kasai (16:39)	Hoshino; WX (11:17)	Dante; End (13:28)	—N/a
Block B	Brahman K. Brahman S.	Moore Mondo	Kodaka Miyamoto	Masada Ito	Inaba T. Sasaki	Shinobu Y. Sasaki
Brahman K. Brahman S.	—N/a	Brahman K. Brahman S. (11:21)	Brahman K. Brahman S. (12:40)	Brahman K. Brahman S. (14:28)	Brahman K. Brahman S. (13:19)	Shinobu; Y. Sasaki (11:48)
Moore Mondo	Brahman K. Brahman S. (11:21)	—N/a	Kodaka; Miyamoto (11:09)	Masada; Ito (11:15)	Moore; Mondo (12:09)	Shinobu; Y. Sasaki (8:59)
Kodaka Miyamoto	Brahman K. Brahman S. (12:40)	Kodaka; Miyamoto (11:09)	—N/a	Kodaka; Miyamoto (20:58)	Kodaka; Miyamoto (15:37)	Kodaka; Miyamoto (17:08)
Masada Ito	Brahman K. Brahman S. (14:28)	Masada; Ito (11:15)	Kodaka; Miyamoto (20:58)	—N/a	Masada; Ito (15:27)	Masada; Ito (12:52)
Inaba T. Sasaki	Brahman K. Brahman S. (13:19)	Moore; Mondo (12:09)	Kodaka; Miyamoto (15:37)	Masada; Ito (15:27)	—N/a	Shinobu; Y. Sasaki (12:38)
Shinobu Y. Sasaki	Shinobu; Y. Sasaki (11:48)	Shinobu; Y. Sasaki (8:59)	Kodaka; Miyamoto (17:08)	Masada; Ito (12:52)	Shinobu; Y. Sasaki (12:38)	—N/a

Semifinals
B1	Brahman Shu and Brahman Kei	Pin
A2	Daisuke Sekimoto and Yuji Okabayashi	13:27
A1	Jaki Numazawaand Jun Kasai	Pin
B2	Isami Kodaka and Yuko Miyamoto	14:13

Finals
A2	Daisuke Sekimoto and Yuji Okabayashi	Pin
A1	Jun Kasai and Jaki Numazawa	17:48

=== 2012 ===
The 2012 Big Japan Tag League was held between September 25 and November 24, 2012.

Final standings
Block A		Block B	
Osamu Nishimura and Shinya Ishikawa	10	Isami Kodaka and Yuko Miyamoto	8
Shinobu and Yuji Okabayashi	6	Ryuji Ito and Takumi Tsukamoto	6
Hercules Senga and Tsutomu Oosugi	4	Jaki Numazawa and Takashi Sasaki	4
Daisuke Sekimoto and Yoshihito Sasaki	4	Brahman Kei and Brahman Shu	4
Daichi Hashimoto and Kazuki Hashimoto	4	Shadow WX and Shuji Ishikawa	4
Amigo Suzuki and Jun Ogawauchi	2	Abdullah Kobayashi and Drake Younger	4

Block A	Suzuki Ogawauchi	D. Hashimoto K. Hashimoto	Sekimoto Y. Sasaki	Senga Oosugi	Nishimura Shinya	Shinobu Okabayashi
Suzuki Ogawauchi	—N/a	Suzuki; Ogawauchi (11:04)	Sekimoto; Y. Sasaki (13:20)	Senga; Oosugi (10:41)	Nishamura; Shinya (5:24)	Shinobu; Okabayashi (10:36)
D. Hashimoto K. Hashimoto	Suzuki; Ogawauchi (11:04)	—N/a	Sekimoto; Y. Sasaki (13:37)	D. Hashimoto; K. Hashimoto (13:06)	Nishamura; Shinya (14:33)	D. Hashimoto; K. Hashimoto (11:24)
Sekimoto Y. Sasaki	Sekimoto; Y. Sasaki (13:20)	Sekimoto; Y. Sasaki (13:37)	—N/a	Senga; Oosugi (10:41)	Shinobu; Okabayashi (18:53)	Shinobu; Okabayashi (14:02)
Senga Oosugi	Senga; Oosugi (10:41)	Hashimoto; K. Hashimoto (13:06)	Senga; Oosugi (10:41)	—N/a	Nishamura; Shinya (10:06)	Shinobu; Okabayashi (13:05)
Nishimura Shinya	Nishamura; Shinya (5:24)	Nishamura; Shinya (14:33)	Shinobu; Okabayashi (18:53)	Nishamura; Shinya (10:06)	—N/a	Nishamura; Shinya (15:06)
Shinobu Okabayashi	Shinobu; Okabayashi (10:36)	D. Hashimoto; K. Hashimoto (11:24)	Shinobu; Okabayashi (14:02)	Shinobu; Okabayashi (13:05)	Nishamura; Shinya (15:06)	—N/a
Block B	Kobayashi Younger	Brahman K. Brahman S.	Kodaka Miyamoto	Numazawa T. Sasaki	Ito Tsukamoto	WX Shuji
Kobayashi Younger	—N/a	Kobayashi; Younger (11:52)	Kodaka; Miyamoto (24:56)	Numazawa; T. Sasaki (17:46)	Ito; Tsukamoto (17:10)	Kobayashi; Younger (12:36)
Brahman K. Brahman S.	Kobayashi; Younger (11:52)	—N/a	Kodaka; Miyamoto (14:36)	Numazawa; T. Sasaki (14:10)	Brahman K. Brahman S. (14:42)	Brahman K. Brahman S. (11:38)
Kodaka Miyamoto	Kodaka; Miyamoto (24:56)	Kodaka; Miyamoto (14:36)	—N/a	Kodaka; Miyamoto (14:57)	Ito; Tuskamoto (15:56)	Kodaka; Miyamoto (12:57)
Numazawa T. Sasaki	Numazawa; T. Sasaki (17:46)	Numazawa; T. Sasaki (14:10)	Kodaka; Miyamoto (14:57)	—N/a	Ito; Tuskamoto (17:02)	WX; Shuji (12:47)
Ito Tsukamoto	Ito; Tsukamoto (17:10)	Brahman K. Brahman S. (14:42)	Ito; Tuskamoto (15:56)	Ito; Tuskamoto (17:02)	—N/a	WX; Shuji (13:38)
WX Shuji	Kobayashi; Younger (12:36)	Brahman K. Brahman S. (11:38)	Kodaka; Miyamoto (12:57)	WX; Shuji (12:47)	WX; Shuji (13:38)	—N/a

Semifinals
A1	Osamu Nishimura and Shinya Ishikawa	Sub
A2	Shinobu and Yuji Okabayashi	15:29
B1	Isami Kodaka and Yuko Miyamoto	Pin
B2	Ryuji Ito and Takumi Tsukamoto	14:51

Finals
A2	Yuji Okabayashi and Shinobu	Pin
B1	Yuko Miyamoto and Isami Kodaka	20:38

=== 2013 ===
The 2013 Saikyo Tag League was held between September 25 and November 22, 2013.

Final standings
Block A		Block B	
Daisuke Sekimoto and Yuji Okabayashi	10	Isami Kodaka and Yuko Miyamoto	8
Masashi Takeda and Takumi Tsukamoto	8	Hercules Senga and Tsutomu Oosugi	6
Jaki Numazawa and Jun Kasai	6	Brahman Kei and Brahman Shu	6
Kazuki Hashimoto and Yusaku Obata	4	Dave and Jake Christ	4
Axeman and Ryuichi Kawakami	2	Madoka and Shinya Ishikawa	4
Kankuro Hoshino and Masato Inaba	0	Ryuji Ito and Yoshihito Sasaki	2

Block A	Axeman Kawakami	Sekimoto Okabayashi	Numazawa Kasai	Hoshino Inaba	Hashimoto Obata	Takeda Tsukamoto
Axeman Kawakami	—N/a	Sekimoto; Okabayashi (15:51)	Numazawa; Kasai (15:39)	Axeman; Kawakami (12:09)	Hashimoto; Obata (12:29)	Takeda; Tsukamoto (12:14)
Sekimoto Okabayashi	Sekimoto; Okabayashi (15:51)	—N/a	Sekimoto; Okabayashi (19:17)	Sekimoto; Okabayashi (14:42)	Sekimoto; Okabayashi (17:33)	Sekimoto; Okabayashi (18:10)
Numazawa Kasai	Numazawa; Kasai (15:39)	Sekimoto; Okabayashi (19:17)	—N/a	Numazawa; Kasai (16:04)	Numazawa; Kasai (14:11)	Takeda; Tsukamoto (18:52)
Hoshino Inaba	Axeman; Kawakami (12:09)	Sekimoto; Okabayashi (14:42)	Numazawa; Kasai (16:04)	—N/a	Hashimoto; Obata (12:50)	Takeda; Tsukamoto (11:11)
Hashimoto Obata	Hashimoto; Obata (12:29)	Sekimoto; Okabayashi (17:33)	Numazawa; Kasai (14:11)	Hashimoto; Obata (12:50)	—N/a	Takeda; Tsukamoto (12:28)
Takeda Tsukamoto	Takeda; Tsukamoto (12:14)	Sekimoto; Okabayashi (18:10)	Takeda; Tsukamoto (18:52)	Takeda; Tsukamoto (11:11)	Takeda; Tsukamoto (12:28)	—N/a
Block B	Brahman K. Brahman S.	D. Crist J. Crist	Senga Oosugi	Kodaka Miyamoto	Madoka Ishikawa	Ito Sasaki
Brahman K. Brahman S.	—N/a	Brahman K. Brahman S. (10:03)	Senga; Oosugi (10:03)	Kodaka; Miyamoto (13:25)	Brahman K. Brahman S. (12:20)	Brahman K. Brahman S. (forfeit)
D. Crist J. Crist	Brahman K. Brahman S. (10:03)	—N/a	Senga; Oosugi; 11:14)	Kodaka; Miyamoto (14:36)	D. Crist; J. Crist (9:10)	D. Crist; J. Crist (forfeit)
Senga Oosugi	Senga; Oosugi (10:03)	Senga; Oosugi; 11:14)	—N/a	Senga; Oosugi (12:13)	Madoka; Ishikawa (13:15)	Ito; Sasaki (N/A)
Kodaka Miyamoto	Kodaka; Miyamoto (13:25)	Kodaka; Miyamoto (14:36)	Senga; Oosugi (12:13)	—N/a	Kodaka; Miyamoto (16:17)	Kodaka; Miyamoto (forfeit)
Madoka Ishikawa	Brahman K. Brahman S. (12:20)	D. Crist; J. Crist (9:10)	Madoka; Ishikawa (13:15)	Kodaka; Miyamoto (16:17)	—N/a	Madoka; Ishikawa (forfeit)
Ito Sasaki	Brahman K. Brahman S. (forfeit)	D. Crist; J. Crist (forfeit)	Ito; Sasaki (N/A)	Kodaka; Miyamoto (forfeit)	Madoka; Ishikawa (forfeit)	—N/a

Semifinals
A1	Daisuke Sekimoto and Yuji Okabayashi	Pin
B2	Hercules Senga and Tsutomu Oosugi	13:37
B1	Isami Kodaka and Yuko Miyamoto	Pin
A2	Masashi Takeda and Takumi Tsukamoto	18:29

Finals
B2	Speed of Sounds	Pin
B1	Yuko Miyamoto and Isami Kodaka	15:22

=== 2014 ===
The 2014 Saikyo Tag League featured twelve teams and two blocks with six tag teams in each block. The tournament featured a new format in which one block was named "Strong Style Block" which consisted of matches contested under strong style format and the other block was named "Deathmatch Block" in which matches were contested under deathmatch format. The tournament was held between September 20 and November 21, 2014.

Final standings
Strong Style Block		Deathmatch Block	
Kazuki Hashimoto and Koji Kanemoto	8	Abdullah Kobayashi and Ryuji Ito	8
Daisuke Sekimoto and Hideyoshi Kamitani	8	Isami Kodaka and Yuko Miyamoto	8
Manabu Soya and Ryuichi Kawakami	6	Kankuro Hoshino and Masato Inaba	6
Kohei Sato and Shuji Ishikawa	6	Ryuichi Sekine and Saburo Inematsu	4
Shinobu and Shiori Asahi	2	Brahman Kei and Brahman Shu	4
Hercules Senga and Tsutomu Oosugi	0	Jaki Numazawa and Masashi Takeda	0

Strong Style Block	Sekimoto Kamitani	Hashimoto Kanemoto	Sato Ishikawa	Soya Kawakami	Shinobu Asahi	Senga Oosugi
Sekimoto Kamitani	—N/a	Hashimoto; Kanemoto (15:24)	Sekimoto; Kamitani (21:30)	Sekimoto; Kamitani (16:44)	Sekimoto; Kamitani (15:23)	Sekimoto; Kamitani (15:06)
Hashimoto Kanemoto	Hashimoto; Kanemoto (15:24)	—N/a	Sato; Ishikawa (14:49)	Hashimoto; Kanemoto (15:12)	Hashimoto; Kanemoto (12:43)	Hashimoto; Kanemoto (16:19)
Sato Ishikawa	Sekimoto; Kamitani (21:30)	Sato; Ishikawa (14:49)	—N/a	Soya; Kawakami (13:26)	Sato; Ishikawa (14:08)	Sato; Ishikawa (10:59)
Soya Kawakami	Sekimoto; Kamitani (16:44)	Hashimoto; Kanemoto (15:12)	Soya; Kawakami (13:26)	—N/a	Soya; Kawakami (16:55)	Soya; Kawakami (17:30)
Shinobu Asahi	Sekimoto; Kamitani (15:23)	Hashimoto; Kanemoto (12:43)	Sato; Ishikawa (14:08)	Soya; Kawakami (16:55)	—N/a	Shinobu; Asahi (12:04)
Senga Oosugi	Sekimoto; Kamitani (15:06)	Hashimoto; Kanemoto (16:19)	Sato; Ishikawa (10:59)	Soya; Kawakami (17:30)	Shinobu; Asahi (12:04)	—N/a
Deathmatch Block	Kobayashi Ito	Brahman K. Brahman S.	Kodaka Miyamoto	Numazawa Takeda	Hoshino Inaba	Sekine Inematsu
Kobayashi Ito	—N/a	Kobayashi; Ito (11:14)	Kobayashi; Ito (17:13)	Kobayashi; Ito (15:21)	Hoshino; Inaba (14:06)	Kobayashi; Ito (15:35)
Brahman K. Brahman S.	Kobayashi; Ito (11:14)	—N/a	Kodaka; Miyamoto (17:10)	Brahman K. Brahman S. (N/A)	Brahman K. Brahman S. (12:01)	Sekine; Inematsu (11:27)
Kodaka Miyamoto	Kobayashi; Ito (17:13)	Kodaka; Miyamoto (17:10)	—N/a	Kodaka; Miyamoto (12:24)	Kodaka; Miyamoto (13:53)	Kodaka; Miyamoto (14:35)
Numazawa Takeda	Kobayashi; Ito (15:21)	Brahman K. Brahman S. (N/A)	Kodaka; Miyamoto (12:24)	—N/a	Hoshino; Inaba (15:39)	Sekine; Inematsu (13:01)
Hoshino Inaba	Hoshino; Inaba (14:06)	Brahman K. Brahman S. (12:01)	Kodaka; Miyamoto (13:53)	Hoshino; Inaba (15:39)	—N/a	Hoshino; Inaba (12:24)
Sekine Inematsu	Kobayashi; Ito (15:35)	Sekine; Inematsu (11:27)	Kodaka; Miyamoto (14:35)	Sekine; Inematsu (13:01)	Hoshino; Inaba (12:24)	—N/a

Semifinals
A1	Kazuki Hashimoto and Koji Kanemoto	Pin
B2	Isami Kodaka and Yuko Miyamoto	16:10
B1	Abdullah Kobayashi and Ryuji Ito	Pin
A2	Daisuke Sekimoto and Hideyoshi Kamitani	13:08

Finals
B2	Isami Kodaka and Yuko Miyamoto	Pin
B1	Abdullah Kobayashi and Ryuji Ito	18:44

=== 2015 ===
The 2015 Saikyo Tag League featured twelve teams and two blocks with six tag teams in each block. The tournament was held between September 21 and October 29, 2015.

Final standings
Strong Style Block		Deathmatch Block	
Daisuke Sekimoto and Yuji Okabayashi	8	Ryuichi Sekine and Ryuji Ito	8
Kohei Sato and Shuji Ishikawa	8	Kankuro Hoshino and Masato Inaba	6
Hideyoshi Kamitani and Ryota Hama	6	Isami Kodaka and Yuko Miyamoto	6
Hercules Senga and Tsutomu Oosugi	4	Abdullah Kobayashi and Takayuki Ueki	6
Hideki Suzuki and Yoshihisa Uto	2	Jaki Numazawa and Takumi Tsukamoto	2
Daichi Hashimoto and Kazuki Hashimoto	2	Brahman Kei and Brahman Sei	2

Strong Style Block	D. Hashimoto K. Hashimoto	Sekimoto Okabayashi	Senga Oosugi	Suzuki Uto	Kamitani Hama	Sato Ishikawa
D. Hashimoto K. Hashimoto	—N/a	Sekimoto; Okabayashi (15:46)	D. Hashimoto; K. Hashimoto (12:25)	Suzuki; Uto (13:09)	Kamitani; Hama (13:16)	Sato; Ishikawa (12:25)
Sekimoto Okabayashi	Sekimoto; Okabayashi (15:46)	—N/a	Sekimoto; Okabayashi (14:15)	Sekimoto; Okabayashi (15:33)	Kamitani; Hama (16:12)	Sekimoto; Okabayashi (19:01)
Senga Oosugi	D. Hashimoto; K. Hashimoto (12:25)	Sekimoto; Okabayashi (14:15)	—N/a	Senga; Oosugi (11:02)	Senga; Oosugi (11:41)	Sato; Ishikawa (8:40)
Suzuki Uto	Suzuki; Uto (13:09)	Sekimoto; Okabayashi (15:33)	Senga; Oosugi (11:02)	—N/a	Kamitani; Hama (11:10)	Sato; Ishikawa (15:09)
Kamitani Hama	Kamitani; Hama (13:16)	Kamitani; Hama (16:12)	Senga; Oosugi (11:41)	Kamitani; Hama (11:10)	—N/a	Sato; Ishikawa (14:13)
Sato Ishikawa	Sato; Ishikawa (12:25)	Sekimoto; Okabayashi (19:01)	Sato; Ishikawa (8:40)	Sato; Ishikawa (14:13)	Sato; Ishikawa (15:09)	—N/a
Deathmatch Block	Kobayashi Ueki	Brahman K. Brahman S.	Kodaka Miyamoto	Numazawa Tsukamoto	Hoshino Inaba	Sekine Ito
Kobayashi Ueki	—N/a	Kobayashi; Ueki (12:45)	Kodaka; Miyamoto (16:28)	Kobayashi; Ueki (13:07)	Hoshino; Inaba (14:19)	Kobayashi; Ueki (12:17)
Brahman K. Brahman S.	Kobayashi; Ueki (12:45)	—N/a	Kodaka; Miyamoto (15:04)	Numazawa; Tsukamoto (12:22)	Brahman K. Brahman S.(10:56)	Sekine; Ito (14:07)
Kodaka Miyamoto	Kodaka; Miyamoto (16:28)	Kodaka; Miyamoto (15:04)	—N/a	Kodaka; Miyamoto (14:24)	Hoshino; Inaba (17:59)	Sekine; Ito (16:49)
Numazawa Tsukamoto	Kobayashi; Ueki (13:07)	Numazawa; Tsukamoto (12:22)	Kodaka; Miyamoto (14:24)	—N/a	Hoshino; Inaba (11:03)	Sekine; Ito (N/A)
Hoshino Inaba	Hoshino; Inaba (14:19)	Brahman K. Brahman S.(10:56)	Hoshino; Inaba (17:59)	Hoshino; Inaba (11:03)	—N/a	Sekine; Ito (12:36)
Sekine Ito	Kobayashi; Ueki (12:17)	Sekine; Ito (14:07)	Sekine; Ito (16:49)	Sekine; Ito (N/A)	Sekine; Ito (12:36)	—N/a

Semifinals
A1	Daisuke Sekimoto and Yuji Okabayashi	Pin
B2	Kankuro Hoshino and Masato Inaba	17:32
B1	Ryuichi Sekine and Ryuji Ito	Pin
A2	Kohei Sato and Shuji Ishikawa	17:00

Finals
A1	Daisuke Sekimoto and Yuji Okabayashi	Pin
A2	Kohei Sato and Shuji Ishikawa	18:30

=== 2016 ===
The 2016 Saikyo Tag League featured a unique format as it featured four blocks with each block consisting of four tag teams. Two blocks were Strong Style blocks and two were Deathmatch blocks in the tournament. The tournament was held between September 4 and October 31, 2016.

Final standings
Strong Style Block A		Strong Style Block B		Deathmatch Block A		Deathmatch Block B	
Kohei Sato and Shuji Ishikawa	6	Akebono and Ryota Hama	6	Isami Kodaka and Yuko Miyamoto	4	Ryuji Ito and Toshiyuki Sakuda	4
Daisuke Sekimoto and Yuji Okabayashi	4	Daichi Hashimoto and Hideyoshi Kamitani	4	Masaya Takahashi and Takayuki Ueki	4	Abdullah Kobayashi and Jaki Numazawa	4
Hercules Senga and Tsutomu Oosugi	2	Ryuichi Kawakami and Yasufumi Nakanoue	2	Kankuro Hoshino and Masato Inaba	2	Brahman Kei and Brahman Shu	2
Hideki Suzuki and Takuya Nomura	0	Kazumi Kikuta and Yoshihisa Uto	0	Masashi Takeda and Takumi Tsukamoto	2	Ryuichi Sekine and Saburo Inematsu	2

Strong Style Block A	Sekimoto Okabayashi	Senga Oosugi	Suzuki Nomura	Sato Ishikawa
Sekimoto Okabayashi	—N/a	Sekimoto; Okabayashi (14:31)	Sekimoto; Okabayashi (13:20)	Sato; Ishikawa (16:39)
Senga Oosugi	Sekimoto; Okabayashi (14:31)	—N/a	Senga; Oosugi (7:31)	Sato; Ishikawa (11:03)
Suzuki Nomura	Sekimoto; Okabayashi (13:20)	Senga; Oosugi (7:31)	—N/a	Sato; Ishikawa (14:19)
Sato Ishikawa	Sato; Ishikawa (16:39)	Sato; Ishikawa (11:03)	Sato; Ishikawa (14:19)	—N/a
Strong Style Block B	Akebono Hama	Hashimoto Kamitani	Kikuta Uto	Kawakami Nakanoue
Akebono Hama	—N/a	Akebono; Hama (10:17)	Akebono; Hama (6:56)	Akebono; Hama (9:40)
Hashimoto Kamitani	Akebono; Hama (10:17)	—N/a	Hashimoto; Kamitani (10:37)	Hashimoto; Kamitani (15:19)
Kikuta Uto	Akebono; Hama (6:56)	Hashimoto; Kamitani (10:37)	—N/a	Kawakami; Nakanoue (6:56)
Kawakami Nakanoue	Akebono; Hama (9:40)	Hashimoto; Kamitani (15:19)	Kawakami; Nakanoue (6:56)	—N/a
Deathmatch Block A	Kodaka Miyamoto	Hoshino Inaba	Takeda Tsukamoto	Takahashi Ueki
Kodaka Miyamoto	—N/a	Kodaka; Miyamoto (16:49)	Kodaka; Miyamoto (12:42)	Takahashi; Ueki (8:40)
Hoshino Inaba	Kodaka; Miyamoto (16:49)	—N/a	Takeda; Tsukamoto (13:24)	Hoshino; Inaba (14:17)
Takeda Tsukamoto	Kodaka; Miyamoto (12:42)	Takeda; Tsukamoto (13:24)	—N/a	Takahashi; Ueki (14:44)
Takahashi Ueki	Takahashi; Ueki (8:40)	Hoshino; Inaba (14:17)	Takahashi; Ueki (14:44)	—N/a
Deathmatch Block B	Kobayashi Numazawa	Brahman K. Brahman S.	Sekine Inematsu	Ito Sakuda
Kobayashi Numazawa	—N/a	Kobayashi; Numazawa (12:49)	Kobayashi; Numazawa (14:58)	Ito; Sakuda (10:52)
Brahman K. Brahman S.	Kobayashi; Numazawa (12:49)	—N/a	Sekine; Inematsu (9:57)	Brahman K. Brahman S. (10:57)
Sekine Inematsu	Kobayashi; Numazawa (14:58)	Sekine; Inematsu (9:57)	—N/a	Ito; Sakuda (13:31)
Ito Sakuda	Ito; Sakuda (10:52)	Brahman K. Brahman S. (10:57)	Ito; Sakuda (13:31)	—N/a

Quarterfinals
DA1	Isami Kodaka and Yuko Miyamoto	Pin
DB1	Ryuji Ito and Toshiyuki Sakuda	12:40
DB2	Abdullah Kobayashi and Jaki Numazawa	Pin
DA2	Masaya Takahashi and Takayuki Ueki	13:44
SSA1	Kohei Sato and Shuji Ishikawa	Pin
SSB2	Daichi Hashimoto and Hideyoshi Kamitani	15:10
SSB1	Akebono and Ryota Hama	Pin
SSA2	Daisuke Sekimoto and Yuji Okabayashi	12:14

Semifinals
DA1	Isami Kodaka and Yuko Miyamoto	Pin
DA2	Masaya Takahashi and Takayuki Ueki	9:51
SSA1	Kohei Sato and Shuji Ishikawa	Pin
SSA2	Daisuke Sekimoto and Yuji Okabayashi	13:46

Final
DA1	Isami Kodaka and Yuko Miyamoto	Pin
SSA2	Daisuke Sekimoto and Yuji Okabayashi	18:28

=== 2017 ===
The 2017 Saikyo Tag League featured twelve teams and two blocks with six tag teams in each block. The tournament was held between September 6 and October 15, 2017.

Final standings
Strong Style Block		Deathmatch Block	
Daisuke Sekimoto and Kohei Sato	7	Abdullah Kobayashi and Ryuji Ito	8
Daichi Hashimoto and Hideyoshi Kamitani	6	Masaya Takahashi and Takayuki Ueki	6
Shingo Takagi and Yuji Okabayashi	5	Isami Kodaka and Yuko Miyamoto	6
Ryuichi Kawakami and Yoshihisa Uto	4	Jaki Numazawa and Kenji Fukimoto	4
Ryota Hama and Yasufumi Nakanoue	4	Masashi Takeda and Takumi Tsukamoto	4
Hideki Suzuki and Shogun Okamoto	4	Kankuro Hoshino and Minoru Fujita	2

Strong Style Block	Hashimoto Kamitani	Sekimoto Sato	Suzuki Okamoto	Kawakami Uto	Hama Nakanoue	Takagi Okabayashi
Hashimoto Kamitani	—N/a	Sekimoto; Sato (17:31)	Hashimoto; Kamitani (16:42)	Hashimoto; Kamitani (13:02)	Hashimoto; Kamitani (11:55)	Takagi; Okabayashi (16:41)
Sekimoto Sato	Sekimoto; Sato (17:31)	—N/a	Sekimoto; Sato (14:36)	Kawakami; Uto (12:11)	Sekimoto; Sato (12:50)	Draw (30:00)
Suzuki Okamoto	Hashimoto; Kamitani (16:42)	Sekimoto; Sato (14:36)	—N/a	Suzuki; Okamoto (14:33)	Hama; Nakanoue (11:25)	Suzuki; Okabayashi (13:33)
Kawakami Uto	Hashimoto; Kamitani (13:02)	Kawakami; Uto (12:11)	Suzuki; Okamoto (14:33)	—N/a	Kawakami; Uto (13:02)	Takagi; Okabayashi (16:49)
Hama Nakanoue	Hashimoto; Kamitani (11:55)	Sekimoto; Sato (12:50)	Hama; Nakanoue (11:25)	Kawakami; Uto (13:02)	—N/a	Hama; Nakanoue (13:44)
Takagi Okabayashi	Takagi; Okabayashi (16:41)	Draw (30:00)	Suzuki; Okabayashi (13:33)	Takagi; Okabayashi (16:49)	Hama; Nakanoue (13:44)	—N/a
Deathmatch Block	Kobayashi Ito	Kodaka Miyamoto	Numazawa Fukimoto	Hoshino Fujita	Takeda Tsukamoto	Takahashi Ueki
Kobayashi Ito	—N/a	Kobayashi; Ito (11:05)	Kobayashi; Ito (13:00)	Kobayashi; Ito (17:27)	Kobayashi; Ito (15:19)	Takahashi; Ueki (13:07)
Kodaka Miyamoto	Kobayashi; Ito (11:05)	—N/a	Kodaka; Miyamoto (9:45)	Kodaka; Miyamoto (14:11)	Kodaka; Tsukamoto (15:09)	Takahashi; Ueki (15:03)
Numazawa Fukimoto	Kobayashi; Ito (13:00)	Kodaka; Miyamoto (9:45)	—N/a	Numazawa; Fukimoto (14:17)	Numazawa; Fukimoto (14:46)	Takahashi; Ueki (14:09)
Hoshino Fujita	Kobayashi; Ito (17:27)	Kodaka; Miyamoto (14:11)	Numazawa; Fukimoto (14:17)	—N/a	Takeda; Tsukamoto (16:34)	Hoshino; Fujita (15:16)
Takeda Tsukamoto	Kobayashi; Ito (15:19)	Kodaka; Tsukamoto (15:09)	Numazawa; Fukimoto (14:46)	Takeda; Tsukamoto (16:34)	—N/a	Takeda; Tsukamoto (14:53)
Takahashi Ueki	Takahashi; Ueki (13:07)	Takahashi; Ueki (15:03)	Takahashi; Ueki (14:09)	Hoshino; Fujita (15:16)	Takeda; Tsukamoto (14:53)	—N/a

Semifinals
SS1	Daisuke Sekimoto and Kohei Sato	Pin
SS2	Daichi Hashimoto and Hideyoshi Kamitani	13:10
D1	Abdullah Kobayashi and Ryuji Ito	Sub
D2	Masaya Takahashi and Takayuki Ueki	11:45

Finals
SS2	Daichi Hashimoto and Hideyoshi Kamitani	Pin
D1	Abdullah Kobayashi and Ryuji Ito	16:06

=== 2018 ===
The 2018 Saikyo Tag League featured a total of fourteen teams with seven teams in each block. The tournament took place between August 12 and October 25, 2018.

Final standings
Strong Style Block		Deathmatch Block	
Ryota Hama and Yasufumi Nakanoue	10	Ryuji Ito and Ryuichi Sekine	10
Daichi Hashimoto and Hideyoshi Kamitani	8	Abdullah Kobayashi and Yoshihisa Uto	8
Ryuichi Kawakami and Kazumi Kikuta	6	Masaya Takahashi and Kyu Mogami	6
Tatsuhiko Yoshino and Kota Sekifuda	6	Masashi Takeda and Takumi Tsukamoto	6
Hideki Suzuki and Daisuke Sekimoto	6	Takayuki Ueki and Toshiyuki Sakuda	4
Kazuki Hashimoto and Yuya Aoki	4	Yuko Miyamoto and Isami Kodaka	4
Takuya Nomura and Fuminori Abe	2	Minoru Fujita and Kankuro Hoshino	4

Strong Style Block	Suzuki Sekimoto	D. Hashimoto Kamitani	K. Hashimoto Aoki	Kawakami Kikuta	Hama Nakanoue	Nomura Abe	Yoshino Sekifuda
Suzuki Sekimoto	—N/a	Suzuki; Sekimoto (13:10)	Suzuki; Sekimoto (11:53)	Kawakami; Kikuta (12:12)	Hama; Nakanoue (10:26)	Suzuki; Sekimoto (09:49)	Yoshina; Sekifuda (11:38)
D. Hashimoto Kamitani	Suzuki; Sekimoto (13:10)	—N/a	D. Hashimoto; Kamitani (11:01)	D. Hashimoto; Kamitani (15:10)	Hama; Nakanoue (13:16)	D. Hashimoto; Kamitani (15:47)	D. Hashimoto; Kamitani (13:05)
K. Hashimoto Aoki	Suzuki; Sekimoto (11:53)	D. Hashimoto; Kamitani (11:01)	—N/a	Kawakami; Kikuta (11:16)	Hama; Nakanouse (12:33)	K. Hashimoto; Aoki (11:37)	K. Hashimoto; Aoki (10:01)
Kawakami Kikuta	Kawakami; Kikuta (12:12)	D. Hashimoto; Kamitani (15:10)	Kawakami; Kikuta (11:16)	—N/a	Kawakami; Kikuta (11:16)	Kawakami; Kikuta (10:11)	Yoshino; Sekifuda (12:33)
Hama Nakanoue	Hama; Nakanoue (10:26)	Hama; Nakanoue (13:16)	Hama; Nakanouse (12:33)	Kawakami; Kikuta (11:16)	—N/a	Nomura; Abe (10:58)	Hama; Nakanoue (11:29)
Nomura Abe	Suzuki; Sekimoto (09:49)	D. Hashimoto; Kamitani (15:47)	K. Hashimoto; Aoki (11:37)	Kawakami; Kikuta (10:11)	Nomura; Abe (10:58)	—N/a	Yoshino; Sekifuda (10:36)
Yoshino Sekifuda	Yoshina; Sekifuda (11:38)	D. Hashimoto; Kamitani (13:05)	K. Hashimoto; Aoki (10:01)	Yoshino; Sekifuda (12:33)	Hama; Nakanoue (11:29)	Yoshino; Sekifuda (10:36)	—N/a
Deathmatch Block	Kobayashi Uto	Takahashi Mogami	Miyamoto Kodaka	Ito Sekine	Takeda Tsukamoto	Fujita Hoshino	Ueki Sakuda
Kobayashi Uto	—N/a	Kobayashi; Uto (13:30)	Kobayashi; Uto (11:37)	Ito; Sekine (12:14)	Takeda; Tsukamoto (13:02)	Kobayashi; Uto (17:42)	Kobayashi; Uto (15:24)
Takahashi Mogami	Kobayashi; Uto (13:30)	—N/a	Takahashi; Mogami (09:27)	Ito; Sekine (14:38)	Takahashi; Mogami (13:38)	Fujita; Hoshino (15:35)	Takahashi; Mogami (12:47)
Miyamoto Kodaka	Kobayashi; Uto (11:37)	Takahashi; Mogami (09:27)	—N/a	Ito; Sekine (forfeit)	Takeda; Tsukamoto (forfeit)	Miyamoto; Kodaka (15:27)	Miyamoto; Kodaka (12:07)
Ito Sekine	Ito; Sekine (12:14)	Ito; Sekine (14:38)	Ito; Sekine (forfeit)	—N/a	Ito; Sekine (18:19)	Ito; Sekine (12:36)	Ueki; Sakuda (15:53)
Takeda Tsukamoto	Takeda; Tsukamoto (13:02)	Takahashi; Mogami (13:38)	Takeda; Tsukamoto (forfeit)	Ito; Sekine (18:19)	—N/a	Fujita; Hoshino (12:33)	Takeda; Tsukamoto (14:04)
Fujita Hoshino	Kobayashi; Uto (17:42)	Fujita; Hoshino (15:35)	Miyamoto; Kodaka (15:27)	Ito; Sekine (12:36)	Fujita; Hoshino (12:33	—N/a	Ueki; Sakuda (12:28)
Ueki Sakuda	Kobayashi; Uto (15:24)	Takahashi; Mogami (12:47)	Miyamoto; Kodaka (12:07)	Ueki; Sakuda (15:53)	Takeda; Tsukamoto (14:04)	Ueki; Sakuda (12:28)	—N/a

Semifinals
A1	Ryota Hama and Yasufumi Nakanoue	Pin
B2	Abdullah Kobayashi and Yoshihisa Uto	11:39
B1	Ryuji Ito and Ryuichi Sekine	Pin
A2	Daichi Hashimoto and Hideyoshi Kamitani	14:08

Finals
A1	Ryota Hama and Yasufumi Nakanoue	Pin
A2	Daichi Hashimoto and Hideyoshi Kamitani	14:08

=== 2019 ===
The 2019 Saikyo Tag League featured a total of fifteen teams, with eight teams in the Strong Style Block and seven teams in the Deathmatch Block. The tournament took place between September 1 and November 26, 2019.

Final standings
Strong Style Block		Deathmatch Block	
Shigehiro Irie and Yuji Okabayashi	10	Masashi Takeda and Takumi Tsukamoto	10
Daichi Hashimoto and Hideyoshi Kamitani )	10	Rickey Shane Page and Ryuji Ito	8
Kazumi Kikuta and Ryuichi Kawakami	8	Abdullah Kobayashi and Kankuro Hoshino	8
Daisuke Sekimoto and The Bodyguard	8	Isami Kodaka and Yuko Miyamoto	6
Ryota Hama and Yasufumi Nakanoue	8	Toshiyuki Sakuda and Yuki Ishikawa	4
El Lindaman and T-Hawk	6	Drew Parker and Orca Uto	4
Fuminori Abe and Takuya Nomura	6	Masaya Takahashi and Takayuki Ueki (Note: Takahashi and Ueki pulled out of the tournament after their first match.)	2
Akira Hyodo and Takuho Kato	0		

Strong Style Block	Sekimoto Bodyguard	Hashimoto Kamitani	Hama Nakanoue	Kikuta Kawakami	Abe Nomura	Hyodo Kato	Lindaman T-Hawk	Irie Okabayashi
Sekimoto Bodyguard	—N/a	Hashimoto; Kamitani (23:18)	Sekimoto; Bodyguard (16:31)	Kikuta; Kawakami (13:28)	Abe; Nomura (19:54)	Sekimoto; Bodyguard (15:18)	Sekimoto; Bodyguard (16:36)	Sekimoto; Bodyguard (18:38)
Hashimoto Kamitani	Hashimoto; Kamitani (23:18)	—N/a	Hama; Nakanoue (14:46)	Hashimoto; Kamitani (20:56)	Hashimoto; Kamitani (14:14)	Hashimoto; Kamitani (15:26)	Hashimoto; Kamitani (16:03)	Irie; Okabayashi (20:44)
Hama Nakanoue	Sekimoto; Bodyguard (16:31)	Hama; Nakanoue (14:46)	—N/a	Kikuta; Kawakami (12:29)	Hama; Nakanoue (11:43)	Hama; Nakanoue (11:33)	Lindaman; T-Hawk (10:46)	Irie; Okabayashi (16:59)
Kikuta Kawakami	Kikuta; Kawakami (13:28)	Hashimoto; Kamitani (20:56)	Kikuta; Kawakami (12:29)	—N/a	Abe; Nomura (12:05)	Kikuta; Kawakami (9:50)	Lindaman; T-Hawk (12:35)	Kikuta; Kawakami (13:46)
Abe Nomura	Abe; Nomura (19:54)	Hashimoto; Kamitani (14:14)	Hama; Nakanoue (11:43)	Abe; Nomura (12:05)	—N/a	Abe; Nomura (N/A)	Lindaman; T-Hawk (11:39)	Irie; Okabayashi (14:57)
Hyodo Kato	Sekimoto; Bodyguard (15:18)	Hashimoto; Kamitani (15:26)	Hama; Nakanoue (11:33)	Kikuta; Kawakami (9:50)	Abe; Nomura (N/A)	—N/a	Lindaman; T-Hawk (10:52)	Irie; Okabayashi (16:41)
Lindaman T-Hawk	Sekimoto; Bodyguard (16:36)	Hashimoto; Kamitani (16:03)	Lindaman; T-Hawk (10:46)	Lindaman; T-Hawk (12:35)	Lindaman; T-Hawk (11:39)	Lindaman; T-Hawk (10:52)	—N/a	Irie; Okabayashi (17:19)
Irie Okabayashi	Sekimoto; Bodyguard (18:38)	Irie; Okabayashi (20:44)	Irie; Okabayashi (16:59)	Kikuta; Kawakami (13:46)	Irie; Okabayashi (14:57)	Irie; Okabayashi (16:41)	Irie; Okabayashi (17:19)	—N/a
Deathmatch Block	Kodaka Miyamoto	Takeda Tsukamoto	Ito Page	Kobayashi Hoshino	Uto Parker	Sakuda Ishikawa	Takahashi Ueki	
Kodaka Miyamoto	—N/a	Kodaka; Miyamoto (15:43)	Ito; Page (10:28)	Kobayashi; Hoshino (15:06)	Kodaka; Miyamoto (12:17)	Sakuda; Ishikawa (N/A)	Kodaka; Miyamoto (forfeit)	
Takeda Tsukamoto	Kodaka; Miyamoto (15:43)	—N/a	Takeda; Tsukamoto (N/A)	Takeda; Tsukamoto (14:42)	Takeda; Tsukamoto (11:20)	Takeda; Tsukamoto (13:20)	Takeda; Tsukamoto (forfeit)	
Ito Page	Ito; Page (10:28)	Takeda; Tsukamoto (N/A)	—N/a	Ito; Page (12:16)	Ito; Page (9:07)	Sakuda; Ishikawa (11:19)	Ito; Page (forfeit)	
Kobayashi Hoshino	Kobayashi; Hoshino (15:06)	Takeda; Tsukamoto (14:42)	Ito; Page (12:16)	—N/a	Kobayashi; Hoshino (12:04)	Kobayashi; Hoshino (12:57)	Kobayashi; Hoshino (forfeit)	
Uto Parker	Kodaka; Miyamoto (12:17)	Takeda; Tsukamoto (11:20)	Ito; Page (9:07)	Kobayashi; Hoshino (12:04)	—N/a	Uto; Parker (15:01)	Uto; Parker (forfeit)	
Sakuda Ishikawa	Sakuda; Ishikawa (N/A)	Takeda; Tsukamoto (13:20)	Sakuda; Ishikawa (11:19)	Kobayashi; Hoshino (12:57)	Uto; Parker (15:01)	—N/a	Takahashi; Ueki (13:14)	
Takahashi Ueki	Kodaka; Miyamoto (forfeit)	Takeda; Tsukamoto (forfeit)	Ito; Page (forfeit)	Kobayashi; Hoshino (forfeit)	Uto; Parker (forfeit)	Takahashi; Ueki (13:14)	—N/a	

Semifinals
A1	Yuji Okabayashi and Shigehiro Irie	Pin
B2	Hideyoshi Kamitani and Daichi Hashimoto	10:32
B1	Masashi Takeda and Takumi Tsukamoto	Pin
A2	Rickey Shane Page and Ryuji Ito	12:43

Finals
A1	Yuji Okabayashi and Shigehiro Irie	Pin
A2	Rickey Shane Page and Ryuji Ito	16:19

=== 2020 ===
The 2020 Saikyo Tag League took place as a single-elimination tournament between September 23 and October 20, 2020.

Round 1
3rd Generation Chimidoro Brothers (Masaya Takahashi and Takayuki Ueki)	Pin
Brahman Brothers (Brahman Kei and Brahman Shu)	10:49
Daisuke Sekimoto and Kohei Sato	12:20
Kuma Arashi and Yasufumi Nakanoue	Pin
Abdullah Kobayashi and Minoru Fujita	Pin
Jaki Numazawa and Kenji Fukimoto	15:40

Round 2
3rd Generation Chimidoro Brothers (Masaya Takahashi and Takayuki Ueki)	15:27
Ryuji Ito and Shunma Katsumata	Pin
Okami (Daichi Hashimoto and Hideyoshi Kamitani)	Pin
Kuma Arashi and Yasufumi Nakanoue	11:55

Semifinals
Ryuji Ito and Shunma Katsumata	Pin
Yankee Two Kenju (Isami Kodaka and Yuko Miyamoto)	13:29
Okami (Daichi Hashimoto and Hideyoshi Kamitani)	Pin
Astronauts (Fuminori Abe and Takuya Nomura)	11:58

Final
Ryuji Ito and Shunma Katsumata	21:40
Okami (Daichi Hashimoto and Hideyoshi Kamitani)	Pin

=== 2022 ===
The 2022 Saikyo Tag League was held from September 4 to February 13, 2023, with the format returning to its traditional round-robin instead of a single-elimination tournament. The tournament featured 18 teams, divided into two blocks of nine teams each.

Final standings
Block A		Block B	
Fuminori Abe and Takuya Nomura	10	Masashi Takeda and Takumi Tsukamoto	13
Hiroyuki Suzuki and Takuho Kato	10	Abdullah Kobayashi and Daiju Wakamatsu	12
Andy Wu and Yasufumi Nakanoue	10	Shigehiro Irie and Yuya Aoki	10
Isami Kodaka and Yuko Miyamoto	10	Daichi Hashimoto and Hideyoshi Kamitani	9
Kazumi Kikuta and Kohei Sato	9	Chicharito Shoki and Yuji Okabayashi	8
Kota Sekifuda and Tomato Kaji	8	Michio Kageyama and Yusaku Ito	8
Masaya Takahashi and Masked GO!GOGO	6	Kazuki Hashimoto and Satsuki Nagao	8
Jaki Numazawa and Ryuji Ito	5	Kankuro Hoshino and Yuichi Taniguchi	2
Daisuke Sekimoto and Kazumasa Yoshida	4	Brahman Kei and Brahman Shu	2

Block A	Wu Nakanoue	Sekimoto Yoshida	Abe Nomura	Suzuki Kato	Kodaka Miyamoto	Numazawa Ito	Kikuta Sato	Sekifuda Kaji	Takahashi GO!GOGO
Wu Nakanoue	—N/a	Wu; Nakanoue (17:17)	Wu; Nakanoue (13:53)	Draw (20:00)	Wu; Nakanoue (13:37)	Numazawa; R. Ito (10:47)	Draw (20:00)	Sekifuda; Kaji (11:41)	Wu; Nakanoue (11:17)
Sekimoto Yoshida	Wu; Nakanoue (17:17)	—N/a	Abe; Nomura (13:42)	Suzuki; Kato (15:17)	Kodaka; Miyamoto (11:22)	Numazawa; R. Ito (13:29)	Kikuta; Sato (13:22)	Sekimoto; Yoshida (12:14)	Sekimoto; Yoshida (N/A)
Abe Nomura	Wu; Nakanoue (13:53)	Abe; Nomura (13:42)	—N/a	Suzuki; Kato (15:22)	Kodaka; Miyamoto (17:06)	Abe; Nomura (11:47)	Abe; Nomura (10:53)	Abe; Nomura (11:09)	Abe; Nomura (N/A)
Suzuki Kato	Draw (20:00)	Suzuki; Kato (15:17)	Suzuki; Kato (15:22)	—N/a	Kodaka; Miyamoto (13:45)	DCO (11:23)	Suzuki; Kato (14:27)	Sekifuda; Kaji (11:14)	Suzuki; Kato (12:59)
Kodaka Miyamoto	Wu; Nakanoue (13:37)	Kodaka; Miyamoto (11:22)	Kodaka; Miyamoto (17:06)	Kodaka; Miyamoto (13:45)	—N/a	Kodaka; Miyamoto (12:15)	Kodaka; Miyamoto (12:29)	Sekifuda; Kaji (12:14)	Takahashi; GO!GOGO (15:28)
Numazawa R. Ito	Numazawa; R. Ito (10:47)	Numazawa; R. Ito (13:29)	Abe; Nomura (11:47)	DCO (11:23)	Kodaka; Miyamoto (12:15)	—N/a	Kikuta; Sato (9:29)	Sekifuda; Kaji (12:29)	Takahashi; GO!GOGO (13:01)
Kikuta Sato	Draw (20:00)	Kikuta; Sato (13:22)	Abe; Nomura (10:53)	Suzuki; Kato (14:27)	Kodaka; Miyamoto (12:29)	Kikuta; Sato (9:29)	—N/a	Kikuta; Sato (1:19)	Kikuta; Sato (N/A)
Sekifuda Kaji	Sekifuda; Kaji (11:41)	Sekimoto; Yoshida (12:14)	Abe; Nomura (11:09)	Sekifuda; Kaji (11:14)	Sekifuda; Kaji (12:14)	Sekifuda; Kaji (12:29)	Kikuta; Sato (1:19)	—N/a	Takahashi; GO!GOGO (14:21)
Takahashi GO!GOGO	Wu; Nakanoue (11:17)	Sekimoto; Yoshida (N/A)	Abe; Nomura (N/A)	Suzuki; Kato (12:59)	Takahashi; GO!GOGO (15:28)	Takahashi; GO!GOGO (13:01)	Kikuta; Sato (N/A)	Takahashi; GO!GOGO (14:21)	—N/a
Block B	Kobayashi Wakamatsu	Brahman K. Brahman S.	Shoki Okabayashi	D. Hashimoto Kamitani	Hoshino Taniguchi	K. Hashimoto Nagao	Takeda Tsukamoto	Kageyama Y. Ito	Irie Aoki
Kobayashi Wakamatsu	—N/a	Kobayashi; Wakamatsu (7:10)	Kobayashi; Wakamatsu (12:29)	Kobayashi; Wakamatsu (14:16)	Kobayashi; Wakamatsu (11:49)	Kobayashi; Wakamatsu (12:02)	Takeda; Tsukamoto (15:43)	Kobayashi; Wakamatsu (12:47)	Irie; Aoki (13:40)
Brahman K. Brahman S.	Kobayashi; Wakamatsu (7:10)	—N/a	Shoki; Okabayashi (8:28)	D. Hashimoto; Kamitani (14:30)	Brahman K. Brahman S. (10:25)	K. Hashimoto; Nagao (10:50)	Takeda; Tsukamoto (9:36)	Kageyama; Y. Ito (7:31)	Irie; Aoki (6:09)
Shoki Okabayashi	Kobayashi; Wakamatsu (12:29)	Shoki; Okabayashi (8:28)	—N/a	D. Hashimoto; Kamitani (10:36)	Shoki; Okabayashi (12:12)	K. Hashimoto; Nagao (12:32)	Shoki; Okabayashi (16:18)	Shoki; Okabayashi (11:06)	Irie; Aoki (14:21)
D. Hashimoto Kamitani	Kobayashi; Wakamatsu (14:16)	D. Hashimoto; Kamitani (14:30)	D. Hashimoto; Kamitani (10:36)	—N/a	Hoshino; Taniguchi (12:32)	D. Hashimoto; Kamitani (12:46)	Draw (20:00)	D. Hashimoto; Kamitani (N/A)	Irie; Aoki (12:35)
Hoshino Taniguchi	Kobayashi; Wakamatsu (11:49)	Brahman K. Brahman S. (10:25)	Shoki; Okabayashi (12:12)	Hoshino; Taniguchi (12:32)	—N/a	K. Hashimoto; Nagao (12:18)	Takeda; Tsukamoto (15:34)	Kageyama; Y. Ito (16:31)	Irie; Aoki (8:23)
K. Hashimoto Nagao	Kobayashi; Wakamatsu (12:02)	Hashimoto; Nagao (10:50)	K. Hashimoto; Nagao (12:32)	D. Hashimoto; Kamitani (12:46)	K. Hashimoto; Nagao (12:18)	—N/a	Takeda; Tsukamoto (16:07)	Kageyama; Y. Ito (15:15)	K. Hashimoto; Nagao (15:12)
Takeda Tsukamoto	Takeda; Tsukamoto (15:43)	Takeda; Tsukamoto (9:36)	Shoki; Okabayashi (16:18)	Draw (20:00)	Takeda; Tsukamoto (15:34)	Takeda; Tsukamoto (16:07)	—N/a	Takeda; Tsukamoto (13:57)	Takeda; Tsukamoto (15:02)
Kageyama Y. Ito	Kobayashi; Wakamatsu (12:47)	Kageyama; Y. Ito (7:31)	Shoki; Okabayashi (11:06)	D. Hashimoto; Kamitani (N/A)	Kageyama; Y. Ito (16:31)	Kageyama; Y. Ito (15:15)	Takeda; Tsukamoto (13:57)	—N/a	Kageyama; Y. Ito (16:13)
Irie Aoki	Irie; Aoki (13:40)	Irie; Aoki (6:09)	Irie; Aoki (14:21)	Irie; Aoki (12:35)	Irie; Aoki (8:23)	K. Hashimoto; Nagao (15:12)	Takeda; Tsukamoto (15:02)	Kageyama; Y. Ito (16:13)	—N/a

Finalist Decisions
Fuminori Abe and Takuya Nomura	Pin
Isami Kodaka and Yuko Miyamoto	16:20
Abdullah Kobayashi and Daiju Wakamatsu	Pin
Shigehiro Irie and Yuya Aoki	10:19

Semifinals
A1	Fuminori Abe and Takuya Nomura	Pin
B1	Masashi Takeda and Takumi Tsukamoto	15:18^{1}
B2	Abdullah Kobayashi and Daiju Wakamatsu	Pin
A2	Hiroyuki Suzuki and Takuho Kato	16:06

Finals
B1	Masashi Takeda and Takumi Tsukamoto	17:57
B2	Abdullah Kobayashi and Daiju Wakamatsu	Pin

1 The match initially ended in a no contest but was immediately restarted.

== See also ==
- List of Big Japan Pro Wrestling tournaments
