= BJW Heavyweight Championship =

Professional wrestling championship

Details
- Promotion: Big Japan Pro Wrestling
- Date established: March 20, 2001
- Date retired: 2004
Statistics
- First champion(s): Kamikaze
- Final champion(s): Men's Teioh
- Most reigns: Men's Teioh (3 reigns)
- Longest reign: Men's Teioh (506 days)
- Shortest reign: Gran Hamada (19 days)

The BJW Heavyweight Championship was a title defended in the Japanese professional wrestling promotion Big Japan Pro Wrestling. It lasted from 2001 through 2004.

== Title history ==
Key
No.	Overall reign number
Reign	Reign number for the specific champion
Days	Number of days held
(NLT)	Championship change took place "no later than" the date listed

No.	Champion	Championship change			Reign statistics		Notes	Ref.
No.	Champion	Date	Event	Location	Reign	Days	Notes	Ref.
1	Kamikaze	March 20, 2001	Excite 2001	Hakata, Japan	1	292	Defeated Zandig in a tournament final to become the inaugural champion.	
2	Daikokubo Benkei	January 6, 2002	New Year Great Series 2002	Kawasaki, Japan	1	224		
3	Daisuke Sekimoto	August 18, 2002	Harder Than Hardcore II	Yokohama, Japan	1	36		
4	Men's Teioh	September 23, 2002	BJ Monster 2002	Tokyo, Japan	1	48		
—	Vacated	November 10, 2002	—	—	—	—	Vacated due to unknown circumstances.	
5	Men's Teioh	March 30, 2003	Harder Than Hardcore IV	Yokohama, Japan	2	506	Defeated Daisuke Sekimoto to win the vacant title.	
6	Gran Hamada	August 17, 2004	Summer Night BJ Osaka Live	Osaka, Japan	1	19		
7	Men's Teioh	September 5, 2004	Men's World III: King Kong	Tokyo, Japan	3	(Note: The exact date the championship was deactivated has not been confirmed, putting their title reign at between 1 day and 117 days.)		
—	Deactivated	2004 (NLT)	—	—	—	—		

== Combined reigns ==
¤	The exact length of at least one title reign is uncertain, so the shortest possible length is used.

Rank	Wrestler	No. of reigns	Combined days
1	Men's Teioh	3	555¤
2	Kamikaze	1	292
3	Daikokubo Benkei	1	224
4	Daisuke Sekimoto	1	36
5	Gran Hamada	1	19

== See also ==
- Professional wrestling in Japan
