= Daisuke Sekimoto =

Japanese professional wrestler (born 1981)

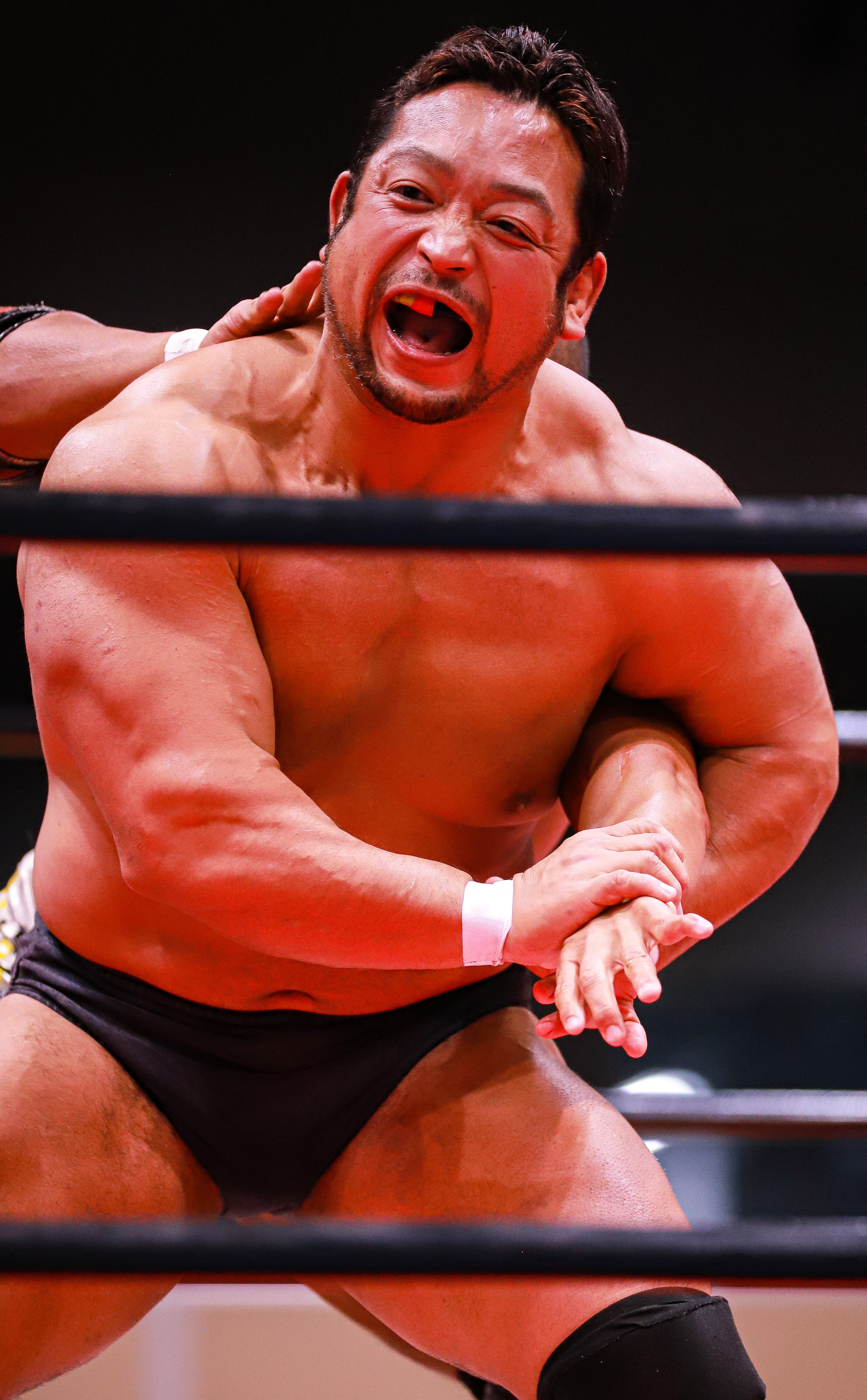
- Sekimoto in 2022

Personal information
- Born: February 9, 1981 (age 45) Osaka, Osaka, Japan

Professional wrestling career
- Ring name(s): Daisuke Sekimoto; Shibata Katsuie; Superman Sekimoto
- Billed height: 1.75 m (5 ft 9 in)
- Billed weight: 120 kg (260 lb)
- Billed from: Tosa, Japan; Osaka, Japan
- Trained by: Ryuji Yamakawa; Tomoaki Honma
- Debut: August 10, 1999

Daisuke Sekimoto (関本 大介, Sekimoto Daisuke) (born February 9, 1981) is a Japanese professional wrestler, He is signed to Big Japan Pro Wrestling (BJW) in the Strong BJ division. where he is a three-time BJW World Strong Heavyweight Champion, former one-time BJW Heavyweight Champion, former thirteen-time BJW Tag Team Champion and former six-time Yokohama Shopping Street 6-Man Tag Team Champion. Sekimoto is best known for his appearances in Pro Wrestling Zero1-Max and Westside Xtreme Wrestling (wXw) and Active Advance Pro Wrestling (2AW).

== High school ==
Sekimoto played on the baseball team at Meitoku Gijuku High School, and has been labeled as one of the "Matsuzaka Generation" of players, even though he did not go on to become a professional baseball player. He was at the team's 1998 Summer Koshien semifinal loss against Yokohama High School, described as a "miracle comeback" for Yokohama, which won despite trailing 6–0 in the top of the eighth inning. Sekimoto has cited the moment that Daisuke Matsuzaka came on as a reliever for Yokohama in that game as a source of inspiration as well as a reminder to stay humble in his own wrestling career — even as a high schooler, Matsuzaka's celebrity commanded such a response from the crowd that "the atmosphere in the ballpark changed completely" when he took the field.

Sekimoto decided to pursue his childhood dream of becoming a professional wrestler after graduating from high school, joining Big Japan Pro Wrestling (BJW) on a recommendation from his baseball coach Shirou Mabuchi.

== Professional wrestling career ==
=== Big Japan Pro Wrestling (1999–present) ===
Daisuke Sekimoto made his professional wrestling debut for BJW on August 10, 1999 by losing to Ryuji Ito. As is customary in professional wrestling, especially in Japan, Sekimoto lost the majority of his matches in his early career. Sekimoto would win his first match ever on March 27, 2000 when he teamed up with Daikokubo Benkei to defeat Guerrero del Futuro and Ryuji Ito. On January 28, 2001, Sekimoto teamed up with MEN's Teioh and defeated Kamikaze and Abdullah Kobayashi to become the BJW Tag Team Champions, this was the first championship Sekimoto ever held. This combination of Sekimoto and Teioh would prove to be extremely successful, along with the BJW Tag Team Championship, the pair would go on to defeat Kintaro Kanemura and Ryuji Yamakawa for the FMW/WEW Hardcore Tag Team Championship and would hold it for over one hundred days before losing the titles to Jun Kasai and The Winger on March 21, 2002. While still holding the BJW Tag Team Championship, Sekimoto challenged Daikokubo Benkei for the BJW Heavyweight Championship and on August 18, 2002 defeated him for the title which was the first singles honour of his career. Holding both the BJW Heavyweight Championship and the BJW Tag Team Championship, Sekimoto was on top of Big Japan but this would last only a short time. Cracks started to show in the relationship between Sekimoto and Teioh and on September 15, 2002 they lost the BJW Tag Team Championship to Benkei Daikokuboh & Abdullah Kobayashi. After losing the titles, Teioh turned on Sekimoto which led to a match between the two for the BJW Heavyweight Championship which took place on September 23 which Teioh won.

With 2003 and 2004 being mostly uneventful for Sekimoto, he started 2005 with a bang by winning the New Generation Battle Tournament by defeating HERO! in the final on January 9. Over the years, Sekimoto would compete in numerous variations of hardcore matches including barbed wire board tag team death match, Fluorescent Lighttubes tag team death match and prison hall Death match, he also competed at RIKI-PRO and Apache Pro Wrestling (Apache Pro) frequently. On October 14, Sekimoto teamed up with Abdullah Kobayashi to win his second BJW Tag Team Championship. 2006 would start on a low point as Sekimoto and Kobayashi lost the titles to Mammoth Sasaki and Shadow WX on January 27. Sekimoto and Tomohiko Hashimoto took part in the WEW Tag Team Title Tournament but wouldn't go past the first round. On December 3, 2006, Sekimoto and Yoshihito Sasaki defeated Mammoth Sasaki and Shadow WX for his third BJW Tag Team Championship. During their four hundred plus days as champions, Sekimoto took on Mammoth Sasaki for the WEW Heavyweight Championship in February 2007. On March 2, Sekimoto and Sasaki lost the BJW tag Team Championship to Kengo Mashimo and Madoka at a Pro Wrestling Zero1 (Zero1) event. With this loss, Sekimoto teamed up with Katsumasa Inoue to take on GAINA and Zero for the Osaka Pro Wrestling Tag Team Championship but lost. Sekimoto and Inoue teamed up once again and took on Handsome Joe and Taka Michinoku for the Strongest-K Tag Team Championship. During a joint event between Big Japan and El Dorado Pro Wrestling, Sekimoto teamed up with Shuji Kondo and defeated KAGETORA and Takashi Sasaki to win the Thanksgiving Day Tag Tournament. On July 13, 2008, Sekimoto and Mammoth Sasaki defeated Kengo Mashimo and Madoka for the BJW Tag Team Championship, however, on March 7, 2009, Saksaki was injured in an auto mobile accident and vacated the championship. In the Maximum Tag League 2009, Sekimoto and Masato Tanaka finished top of block B but would lose to Takashi Sasaki and Yuko Miyamoto in the semifinal. On July 27, 2009, Sekimoto and Yuji Okabayashi defeated Isami Kodaka and Masashi Takeda to win his fifth BJW Tag Team Championship. A month later, Sekimoto won the Eight Man Tag Team Tournament with Shinya Ishikawa, Yoshihito Sasaki and Yuji Okabayashi. On December 13, 2009, Sekimoto and Okabayashi lost the titles to Yoshihito Sasaki and Shinya Ishikawa. 2010 kicked off with a loss at Osaka Pro Wrestling when Sekimoto and Okabayshi lost Hideyoshi & Masamune in a match for the Osaka Pro Wrestling Tag Team Championship. On February 28, 2010, Sekimoto defeated Shuji Ishikawa for the KO-D Openweight Championship. After several defences, he lost the title to Harashima on July 25. He would return next year in the same month to take part in a four-way elimination match for the KO-D Tag Team Championship and teamed with Masa Takanashi and won. They would lose the title on August 28 to Danshoku Dino and Kota Ibushi. Sekimoto began teaming with Yoshihito Sasaki to take part in the BJW Tag Team Championship Tournament and reached the final, which took place on April 28, 2010, and lost to Jaki Numazawa and Jun Kasai. On October 10, Sekimoto and Sasaki defeated Numazawa and Kasai to become a six time BJW Tag Team Championship but would lose the title to Numazawa and Kasai. Sekimoto and Kazuki Hashimoto took part in a year long tag tournament called Dainichi-X 2011 but would not gain enough points to progress to the semifinal. Sekimoto and Yuji Okabayashi took part in the Big Japan Tag League 2011 and won. In March 2012, Sekimoto participated in the Ikkitousen Strong Climb Tournament in block A and reached the final before losing to Yoshihito Sasaki. On August 22, Sekimoto defeated Kengo Mashimo for the Strongest-K Championship and lost it to Yuji Hino on November 13. On September 8, 2013, Sekimoto worked the inaugural event of the Wrestle-1 (W-1) promotion, which Keiji Mutoh formed after leaving All Japan. Teaming with his regular partner Yuji Okabayashi, the two defeated Kaz Hayashi and Shuji Kondo in a tag team match.

=== American promotions (2004–2020) ===
On October 5, 2004, Sekimoto made his American debut, defeating Ian Rotten at an IWA East Coast event. Two days later on October 7, Sekimoto made his debut IWA Mid-South, defeating Nate Webb at an event in New Albany, Indiana.

In October 2008, Sekimoto made his Chikara debut, participating in the promotion's Global Gauntlet weekend. In April 2010, Sekimoto, along with Kankuro Hoshino and Yuji Okabayashi, to take part in Chikara's King Of Trios tournament as Team Big Japan, reaching the semifinals before being eliminated by Bruderschaft des Kreuzes, who went on to win the tournament. In April 2011, Sekimoto reached the semifinal of Combat Zone Wrestling's (CZW) Best Of The Best X tournament but was eliminated by Sami Callihan.

On November 27, 2017, it was announced that Sekimoto would participate at Evolve's WrestleMania weekend events.

=== Pro Wrestling Zero1 (2006–2022) ===
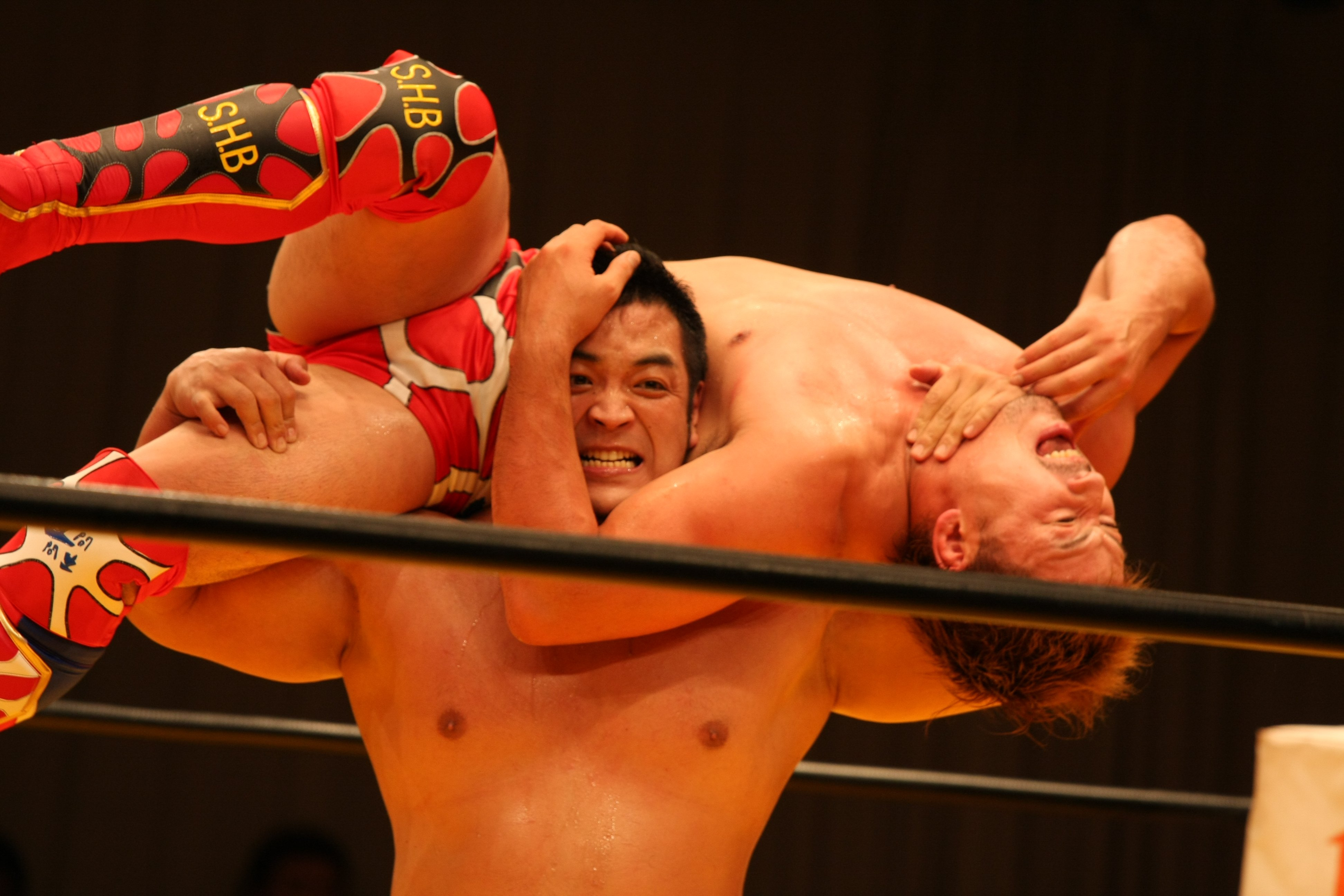
Sekimoto holds Ryoji Sai in an Argentine backbreaker rack in 2009

Sekimoto debuted for Pro Wrestling Zero1 (Zero1) by taking part in the Fire Festival 2001 where he gained no points and there could not progress further. He returned in 2006, once again participating in the Fire Festival but would do a little better by defeating Kohei Sato which left Sekimoto with two points. On March 8, 2007, Sekimoto defeated Ryouji Sai to become the NWA United National Heavyweight Champion. As champion he participated in Fire Festival 2007 and once again fared poorly, gaining three points. On November 13, Sekimoto lost the NWA United National Heavyweight Championship to Yoshihito Sasaki. In block B of the Fire Festival 2008, Sekimoto gained three points and therefore didn't progress further and in next years Fire Festival 2009 gained five points, he was joint top in block B with Masato Tanaka and Ryouji Sai and therefore a decision three-way match took place which Sai won.

The next few years would prove to be very eventful for Sekimoto, he started out competing in the Fire Festival 2010 and would once again fall at the first hurdle. However, shortly after the tournament, Sekimoto defeated Bambikiller to win the World Heavyweight Championship on September 9. Sekimoto would enter his first Furinkazan when he teamed up with Masato Tanaka, the team would reach the final where the NWA Intercontinental Tag Team Championship was also up for grabs, however, they would lose to KAMIKAZE and Kohei Sato. On March 6, 2011, Sekimoto lost the World Heavyweight Championship to Ryouji Sai. Sekimoto would enter the Fire Festival 2011 and would come out on top in the tournament which meant he also became the first NWA Pan-Pacific Premium Heavyweight Championship. On May 16, 2012, Sekimoto took on Akebono in a unification match between the NWA Pan-Pacific Premium Heavyweight Championship and the World Heavyweight Championship, which Akebono won. He would take part in that years Fire Festival and gained five points thus meaning he could not progress further.

=== Westside Xtreme Wrestling (2009–2015, 2018, 2019) ===
On March 6, 2009, Sekimoto took part in Westside Xtreme Wrestling's (wXw) 16 Carat Gold Tournament 2009 and reached the quarterfinal before being eliminated by Steve Douglas. Next year, Sekimoto and Okabayashi defeated Oberhausen Terror Corps to become the number one contenders for the wXw World Tag Team Championship and would lose their championship match to the champions The Switchblade Conspiracy. On January 15, 2012, Sekimoto defeated Big van Walter for the wXw Unified World Wrestling Championship and would lose the championship back to him on March 3. On October 3, 2013, Sekimoto returned to wXw to take part in the 2013 World Triangle League. Three days later, he defeated Jonathan Gresham and Zack Sabre Jr. in the finals to win the tournament. In 2015 at the 15th Anniversary Tour Finale, Sekimoto unsuccessfully challenged Karsten Beck for the wXw Unified World Wrestling Championship.

=== All Japan Pro Wrestling (2011–2012, 2016–present) ===
Sekimoto and Okabayashi debuted for All Japan Pro Wrestling (AJPW) on January 3, 2011, defeating Ryota Hama and Yasufumi Nakanoue. For the first few months, Sekimoto and Okabayashi would perform for All Japan sporadically and on March 21, they defeated Manabu Soya and Seiya Sanada for the All Asia Tag Team Championship. They held the championship for three months before losing it to Soya and Sanada once again. On October 23, Sekimoto and Okabayashi defeated Soya and Sanada becoming two-time All Asia Tag Team Champions. They also participated in World's Strongest Tag Determination League 2011 and gained ten points but not enough to progress to the semifinals. During their second title regain they would defend the title at both All Japan and Big Japan. Sekimoto also took part in Champion Carnival 2012 and gained six points therefore not progressing to the semifinal. On July 1, Sekimoto and Okabayashi lost the All Asia Tag Team Championship to Akebono and Ryota Hama. They returned next month to take on Manabu Soya and Takao Omori for the same title but lost. Sekimoto and Okabayashi returned to All Japan to take part in the World's Strongest Tag Determination League 2012.

Sekimoto returned to AJPW in early 2016, winning the 2016 Champion Carnival. After failing to win the Triple Crown Heavyweight Championship from Kento Miyahara on May 25, Sekimoto and Okabayashi won the World Tag Team Championship on June 15.

== Other media ==
In 2006, Sekimoto appeared as himself alongside Ryuji Ito, Abdullah Kobayashi, Takashi Sasaki and Jaki Numazawa in Dirty Sanchez: The Movie. Sekimoto and the other wrestlers perform wrestling moves on the three main cast members.

== Championships and accomplishments ==
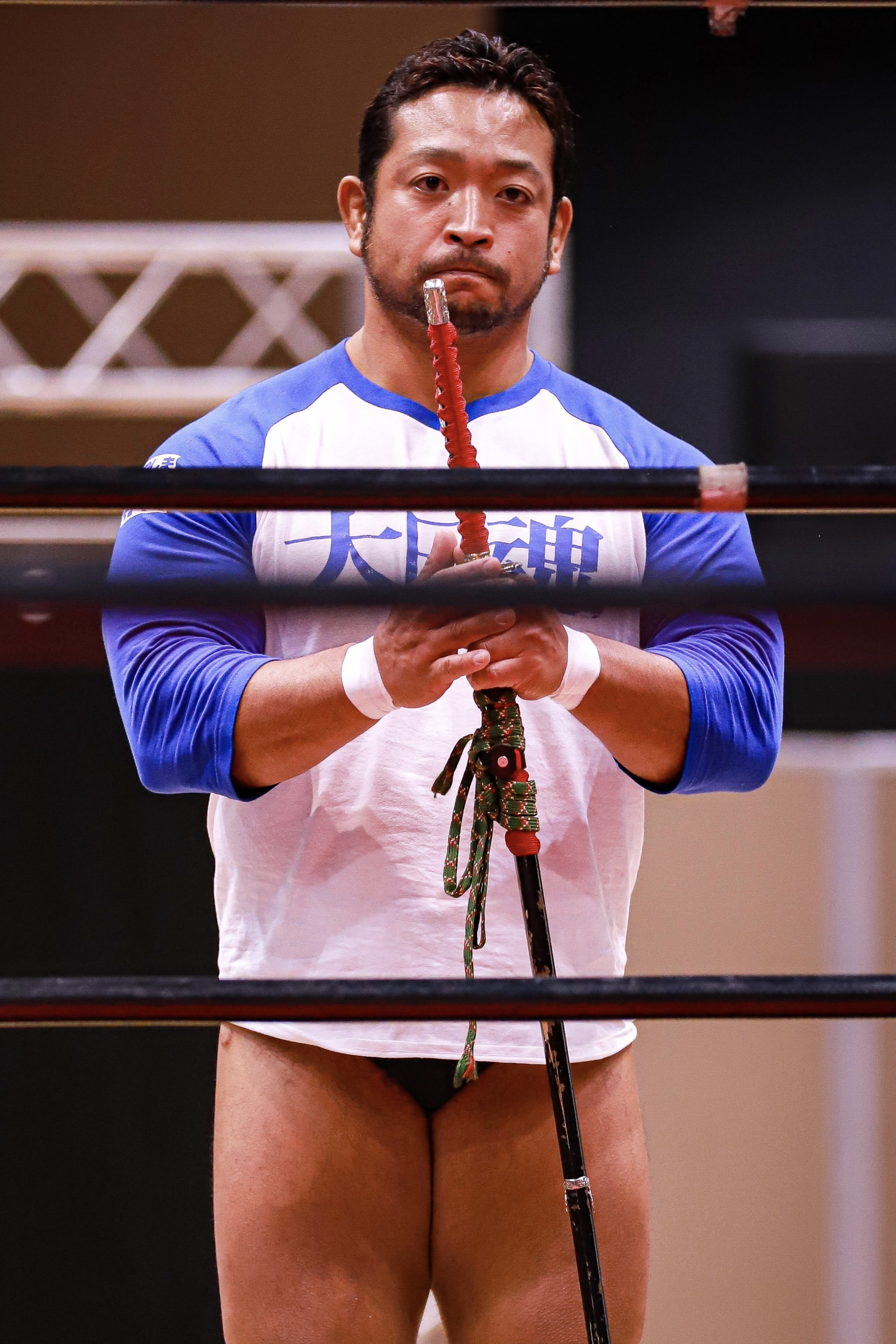
In Pro Wrestling Zero1, Sekimoto is a two-time Fire Festival winner, shown here with the ceremonial fire sword awarded to the winner of the tournament.

- All Japan Pro Wrestling

- All Asia Tag Team Championship (2 times) – with Yuji Okabayashi
- World Tag Team Championship (3 times) – with Yuji Okabayashi
- Gaora TV Championship (1 time)
- Champion Carnival (2016)

- Big Japan Pro Wrestling

- BJW Heavyweight Championship (1 time)
- BJW Tag Team Championship (13 times) – with Men's Teioh (1), Abdullah Kobayashi (1), Yoshihito Sasaki (2), Mammoth Sasaki (1), Yuji Okabayashi (5), The Bodyguard (1), Kohei Sato (1) and So Daimonji (1)
- BJW World Strong Heavyweight Championship (4 times)
- Sakatako Intercontinental Tag Team Championship (1 time) – with Kazuki Hashimoto
- WEW Hardcore Tag Team Championship (1 time) – with Men's Teioh
- Yokohama Shopping Street 6-Man Tag Team Championship (6 times) – with Jaki Numazawa and Ryuji Ito (1), Kohei Sato and Hideyoshi Kamitani (1), Daichi Hashimoto and Hideyoshi Kamitani (2), Akira Hyodo and Takuho Kato (1), Kazumi Kikuta and Yasufumi Nakanoue (1)
- BJW Danichi-X (2004, 2005)
- BJW 8-Man Tag Tournament (2009)
- BJW Maximum Tag League (2001, 2002) – with Men's Teioh
- Saikyo Tag League (2011, 2015, 2016) – with Yuji Okabayashi
- Future Champ League V6 (2001)
- New Generation Battle Tournament (2005)

- DDT Pro-Wrestling

- KO-D Openweight Championship (1 time)
- KO-D Tag Team Championship (3 times) – with Kazusada Higuchi (1), Masa Takanashi (1) and Yuji Okabayashi (1)

- Japan Indie Awards

- Best Bout Award (2010) vs. Masa Takanashi on April 4
- Best Bout Award (2015) vs. Yuji Okabayashi on July 20
- Best Bout Award (2019) vs. Michael Elgin on August 24
- Best Bout Award (2021) vs. Takuya Nomura on October 18
- MVP Award (2010)

- Kaientai Dojo

- Strongest-K Championship (1 time)
- Singles Match of the Year (2012) vs. Yuji Hino on November 13

- Kyushu Pro-Wrestling

- Kyushu Pro-Wrestling Championship (1 time)

- Mobius

- Apex of Triangle Six–Man Tag Team Championship (1 time) – with Nosawa Rongai and Tetsuhiro Kuroda

- Wrestling of Darkness 666

- Peyang Lion Cup (2007) – with Wolf Ozawa

- Pro Wrestling Expo

- Continent Confrontation Tag Team League (2008) – with Masato Tanaka

- Pro Wrestling Illustrated

- Ranked No. 63 of the top 500 wrestlers in the PWI 500 in 2016

- Pro Wrestling Noah

- Best Bout Award (2014) vs. Takashi Sugiura on November 8
- Global League Tournament Fighting Spirit Award (2013)

- Pro Wrestling Zero1

- NWA Intercontinental Tag Team Championship (2 times) – with Akebono (1) and Kohei Sato (1)
- NWA United National Heavyweight Championship (1 time)
- NWA Pan-Pacific Premium Heavyweight Championship (1 time)
- World Heavyweight Championship (2 times)
- Fire Festival (2011, 2022)
- Best Bout (2011) vs. Masato Tanaka on August 7

- Real Japan Pro Wrestling

- Legend Championship (1 time)

- Tenryu Project

- Tenryu Project Six-Man Tag Team Championship (1 time) – with Tatsutoshi Goto and Yoshihiro Takayama

- Tokyo Sports

- Fighting Spirit Award (2013)
- Best Tag Team Award (2011, 2016) – with Yuji Okabayashi
- Technique Award (2007)

- Toshikoshi Puroresu

- Three Organization Shuffle Tag Tournament (2015) – with Konosuke Takeshita
- Toshiwasure! Shuffle Six Man Tag Team Tournament (2023) – with Fuminori Abe and Tetsuya Endo

- Westside Xtreme Wrestling

- wXw Unified World Wrestling Championship (1 time)
- World Triangle League (2013)
