= Hideyoshi Kamitani =

Japanese professional wrestler

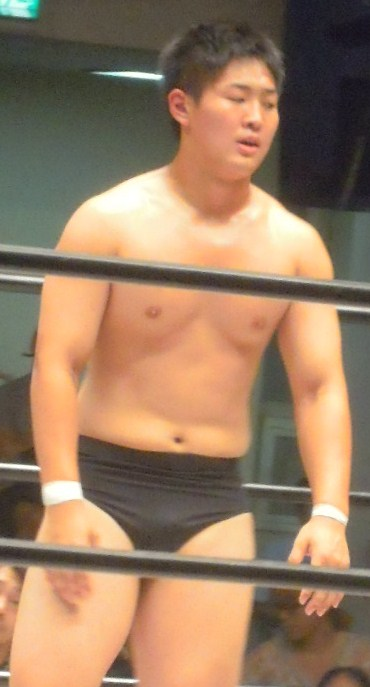
- Kamitani in August 2012

Personal information
- Born: January 28, 1992 (age 34) Matsusaka, Japan

Professional wrestling career
- Ring name: Hideyoshi Kamitani
- Billed height: 1.80 m (5 ft 11 in)
- Billed weight: 108 kg (238 lb)
- Debut: 2012

Hideyoshi Kamitani (神谷英慶, Kamitani Hideyoshi) is a Japanese professional wrestler, currently working for the Japanese professional wrestling promotion Big Japan Pro Wrestling (BJW).

== Professional wrestling career ==
=== Big Japan Pro Wrestling (2012–present) ===
Kamitani made his professional wrestling debut in Big Japan Pro Wrestling (BJW) at a promotion's house show held on April 4, 2012, where he defeated Masashi Otani in an exhibition match. He would often participate at cross-over events held between Big Japan Pro Wrestling, Dramatic Dream Team (DDT) and Kaientai Dojo (K-Dojo) such as the New Year's Eve Toshikoshi Pro-Wrestling 2012 from December 31, where he teamed up with Tank Nagai and FUMA in a losing effort to Daisuke Sekimoto, Shuji Ishikawa and Yuji Hino. Another event of this kind was the BJW/CZW CZW Arena In Japan ~ BJW For MASADA from January 5, 2014, held in partnership with Combat Zone Wrestling (CZW), where he teamed up with Takayuki Ueki, scoring a defeat against Kazuki Hashimoto and Ryuichi Kawakami. At BJW Ryogokutan 2016 on July 24, Kamitani defeated Yuji Okabayashi to win the BJW World Strong Heavyweight Championship. Kamitani worked at BJW/ZERO1 Clash, a cross-over event held by BJW in partnership with Pro Wrestling Zero1 on October 30, 2020, where he teamed up with Ryuichi Kawakami in a losing effort to Drew Parker and Masato Tanaka.

Kamitani made notable appearances in the Ikkitousen Strong Climb tournaments, competing for the first time in the 2014 edition of the event, placing himself in the Block A and going against Shuji Ishikawa, Shinya Ishikawa, Yuko Miyamoto, Atsushi Maruyama and Shiori Asahi, finishing with no points. At the 2016 edition, he occupied a place in the Block A and competed against Daichi Hashimoto, Daisuke Sekimoto, Kohei Sato, Seiya Sanada and Atsushi Maruyama, scoring a total of six points and advancing to the finals where he got defeated by Shuji Ishikawa. Another popular event in which he participated was the Saikyo Tag League, where at the 2014 edition, he teamed up with Daisuke Sekimoto, placing themselves in the Strong Style Block, where they obtained a total of eight points after facing the teams of Koji Kanemoto and Kazuki Hashimoto, Manabu Soya and Ryuichi Kawakami, Shuji Ishikawa and Kohei Sato, Shiori Asahi and Shinobu, and Speed Of Sounds (Tsutomu Oosugi and Hercules Senga). They made it to the semi-finals where they lost against Ryuji Ito and Abdullah Kobayashi. His best performance was at the 2017 edition, where he teamed up with Daichi Hashimoto, scoring six points in the Strong Style Block where they went against the teams of Shingo Takagi and Yuji Okabayashi, Ryuichi Kawakami and Yoshihisa Uto, Ryota Hama and Yasufumi Nakanoue, Hideki Suzuki and Shogun Okamoto, and Daisuke Sekimoto and Kohei Sato who they defeated in the semi-finals, and finally Abdullah Kobayashi and Ryuji Ito who they defeated in the finals to win the league.

=== All Japan Pro Wrestling (2016–2019) ===
Kamitani worked a couple of matches for All Japan Pro Wrestling (AJPW), on the seventh night of the AJPW Dream Power Series 2019 from March 21, where he competed in a tag team tournament for the vacant All Asia Tag Team Championship by teaming up with Daichi Hashimoto, defeating Black Menso-re and Takao Omori in the semi-finals, but falling short to Jake Lee and Koji Iwamoto in the finals. At the AJPW Real World Tag League 2017, Kamitani teamed up with Daichi Hashimoto and competed against other teams such as Kento Miyahara and Yoshitatsu, Black Tiger VII and Manabu Soya or Joe Doering and Taiyo Kea. They managed to score twelve points but fell short to Violent Giants (Shuji Ishikawa and Suwama) in the finals on December 12, 2017. His last match for the promotion was at AJPW GROWIN' UP Vol.20 on May 21, 2019, where he teamed up with Jake Lee to defeat Naoya Nomura and Taishi Takizawa.

=== Westside Xtreme Wrestling (2018) ===
Kamitani participated in the wXw World Tag Team League 2018, an event promoted by Westside Xtreme Wrestling (wXw) from October 5 to 7, where he teamed up with his usual tag partner Daichi Hashimoto as Okami, placing themselves in the Block A and competing against Lucha Brothers (Penta El Zero M and Rey Fenix) in a losing effort on the first night. On the second night, they pulled out a victory against Calamari Catch Kings (Chris Brookes and Jonathan Gresham). They finished the tournament scoring a total of three points after they were defeated by Ringkampf (Timothy Thatcher and Walter) on the last night.

== Championships and accomplishments ==
- Big Japan Pro Wrestling
  - BJW Deathmatch Heavyweight Championship (2 times)
  - BJW World Strong Heavyweight Championship (2 times)
  - BJW Tag Team Championship (5 times) – with Ryota Hama (1), Daichi Hashimoto (3) and Isami Kodaka (1)
  - Yokohama Shopping Street 6-Man Tag Team Championship (7 times) – with Daichi Hashimoto and Daisuke Sekimoto (2), Daisuke Sekimoto and Kohei Sato (1), Daichi Hashimoto and Ryuichi Kawakami (1), Daichi Hashimoto and Yuya Aoki (1), Kazumi Kikuta and Yuki Ishikawa (1), Masaki Morihiro and Daichi Hashimoto (1)
  - Saikyo Tag League (2017, 2020) – with Daichi Hashimoto
  - Ikkitousen Deathmatch Survivor (2024)
  - Bloody Musou Tournament (2022)
  - 2 Days Single Tournament (2019)
- Pro-Wrestling Basara
  - UWA World Tag Team Championship (1 time) – with Isami Kodaka
- Pro Wrestling Illustrated
  - Ranked No. 267 of the top 500 singles wrestlers in the PWI 500 in 2023
- Tenryu Project
  - Tenryu Project World 6-Man Tag Team Championship (1 time) — with Daichi Hashimoto and Kazuki Hashimoto
  - United National Tag Team Championship (1 time, current) – with Koji Iwamoto
  - Ryūkon Cup (2024)
