= Daichi Hashimoto =

Japanese professional wrestler (born 1992)

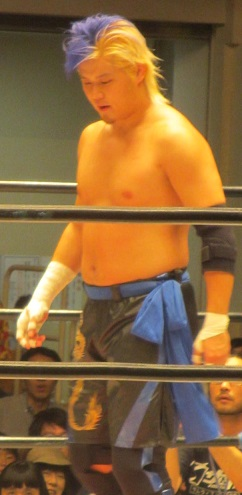
- Hashimoto in September 2015

Personal information
- Born: April 13, 1992 (age 34) Kanagawa Prefecture
- Children: 1
- Father: Shinya Hashimoto

Professional wrestling career
- Ring name(s): Daichi Hashimoto; Hashif Khan (II)
- Billed height: 1.80 m (5 ft 11 in)
- Billed weight: 92 kg (203 lb)
- Trained by: Masahiro Chono; Shinjiro Otani
- Debut: March 6, 2011

Daichi Hashimoto (橋本 大地, Hashimoto Daichi; born April 13, 1992) is a Japanese professional wrestler. He is currently signed to Big Japan Pro Wrestling (BJW), where he performs in the Strong BJ division.

In BJW, Hashimoto is a two-time BJW World Strong Heavyweight Champion and three-time BJW Tag Team Champion. He is the son of Shinya Hashimoto and started his career in his father's Pro Wrestling Zero1 (Zero1) promotion.

== Early life ==
The oldest of three children, Daichi Hashimoto grew up around full-contact sports, as his father Shinya was a famous pro wrestler, alongside his "uncles" Masahiro Chono and Keiji Muto. Since the sixth grade, Hashimoto took up karate, and was part of his middle school's MMA team, Blue Sky.

When his father died in July 2005, Hashimoto decided he wanted to become a professional wrestler in order to honour his father's memory. He appeared in the Shinya Hashimoto memorial event in professional wrestling promotion Hustle on July 9, 2006, where he was introduced by his father's tag team partner Naoya Ogawa. He made public his intention to become a wrestler.

In September 2009, he took part in his father's 25th Anniversary show, hosted by Pro Wrestling Zero1 (Zero1). He competed in an exhibition kickboxing match against Satoshi Kobayashi. The match was declared a draw after two two-minute rounds. After the show, Hashimoto expressed again his desire to become a professional wrestler and Masahiro Chono and Shinjiro Otani picked up on his desire and trained him for nearly a year and a half.

== Professional wrestling career ==
=== Pro Wrestling Zero1 (2011–2014) ===
After nearly a year and a half of training, Hashimoto made his debut on March 6, 2011, at Pro Wrestling Zero1's 10th Anniversary show, where he wrestled Masahiro Chono in a losing effort. After the match, he was given advice from his "uncles" Chono and Keiji Muto, and he was also embraced by his mother and his two younger sisters. Fellow Zero1 rookie Yuichiro ☆Jienotsu☆ Nagashima came to congratulate him. Fifteen days later, Hashimoto went to All Japan Pro Wrestling, wrestled Muto, and lost. Over the next few months, Hashimoto would team up with Shinjiro Otani in various types of tag team match up and would even wrestle together at Inoki Genome Federation. On August 27, Hashimoto received his first title shot ever, as he and Otani unsuccessfully challenged Kamikaze and Sato for the NWA Intercontinental Tag Team Championship. In December 2011, Hashimoto took part in the Furinkazan Tag Team League, teaming up with Akebono. He and Akebono started the tournament strong on December 8, defeating Kohei Sato and Kamikaze. Three days later on December 11, Hashimoto and Akebono continued their success by defeating NWA Team, which was revealed to be Schwarz and Weiss. However, the team would go on to lose their next two matches which led to them being placed 3rd in Block B. The Wrestling Observer Newsletter awarded Hashimoto with the Rookie of the Year award for 2011.

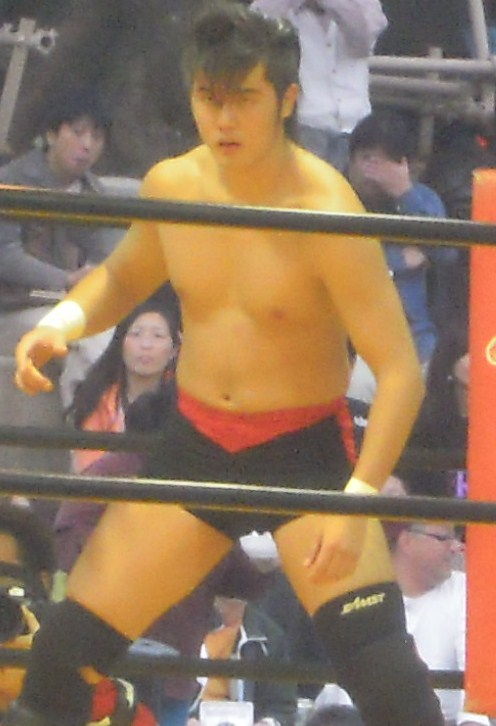
Hashimoto in October 2011

Hashimoto began the new year with a bang on January 1, 2012, when he won his first singles match, defeating Yoshikazu Yokoyama. On March 2 at Zero1's 11TH Anniversary Show, Hashimoto teamed with Otani and lost to Kensuke Sasaki and Katsuhiko Nakajima. In April 2012, Hashimoto participated in Pro Wrestling Noah (Noah)'s Global Tag League with Otani as his partner. On April 11, he and Otani started off strong by defeating Eddie Edwards and Colt Cabana. They defeated the team of Go Shiozaki and Tamon Honda and Yoshihiro Takayama and Maybach Taniguchi. The team lost the rest of their matches meaning that Hashimoto and Otani ended the Global Tag League in 5th place with six points. Hashimoto and Otani teamed up together until July when they separated to take part in Fire Festival 2012. Hashimoto lost all four of his tournament matches, including losing to Otani. In September, Hashimoto participated in two tournaments Tenkaichi Junior Tournament 2012 at Zero1 where Hashimoto was defeated by Tatsuhito Takaiwa in the first round. The second tournament he took part in was the Nippon TV Cup Jr. Heavyweight Tag League 2012 in block B at Noah. Hashimoto teamed up with Ikuto Hidaka and won their block with six points but would lose the final to Atsushi Kotoge and Taiji Ishimori. On December 2, he travelled to Hong Kong for his first overseas contest against Zero1 Hong Kong's Bitman. Wrestling as a big heel from Japan, he defeated Bitman after a mist attack follow by a vertical drop DDT. On January 4, 2013, Hashimoto was scheduled to make his debut for New Japan Pro-Wrestling (NJPW), teaming with Keiji Muto at Wrestle Kingdom 7 in Tokyo Dome; however, on December 27, it was announced that he had fractured his left forearm and would be forced to pull out of the match. Despite the injury, Hashimoto made an appearance at the event, having a confrontation with Hiroyoshi Tenzan, after he and Satoshi Kojima had defeated Muto and his replacement, Shinjiro Otani. During the hiatus, Hashimoto bulked up to 95 kg, but eventually slimmed down to 90 kg. Hashimoto returned to the ring on April 15, 2013, when he was defeated by Dramatic Dream Team (DDT) representative Kota Ibushi in a singles match. On May 2, Zero1 announced that Hashimoto had re-aggravated his forearm injury and would once again be sidelined from in-ring action. On October 13, 2013, Hashimoto made his return to the ring, facing Nakajima in a losing effort. On February 11, 2014, Hashimoto received the first singles title shot of his career, when he unsuccessfully challenged Tama Williams for the NWA United National Heavyweight Championship. On April 8, while Hashimoto was recovering from a broken jaw, Zero1 announced that his contract with the promotion had expired on March 31 and he had decided not to re-sign. At a press conference the following day, Hashimoto announced that going forward he would be working as a freelancer.

=== Inoki Genome Federation (2014–2015) ===
On June 5, 2014, Hashimoto and the Inoki Genome Federation (IGF) held a press conference to announce that he had signed with the promotion. He made his debut for the promotion on July 13, losing to Kazuyuki Fujita. On July 13, 2015, Hashimoto took part in an event, which commemorated the tenth anniversary of his father's death, losing to Yuji Nagata in the main event.

=== Big Japan Pro Wrestling (2015–present) ===
In June 2015, Hashimoto began wrestling in Big Japan Pro Wrestling (BJW), primarily teaming with Kazuki Hashimoto (no relation) as "Team Yamato". On January 1, 2016, BJW announced that Hashimoto had signed with the promotion, making him a full-time member of their roster, representing their Strong division. In October 2017, he won his first tournament, the Saikyo Tag League, teaming with Hideyoshi Kamitani, winning their Strong block, before defeating the winners of the Deathmatch block, Abdullah Kobayashi and Ryuji Ito, in the finals. On December 17, Hashimoto won his first title, when he defeated Hideki Suzuki for the BJW World Strong Heavyweight Championship. On February 2, 2018, Hashimoto adopted his father's alter-ego from Stampede Wrestling, Hashif Khan, for the third show of the day. On November 4, 2019, he defeated Kohei Sato to win the World Strong Heavyweight title for the second time. His second reign would last until October 2020, when he lost it to Yuji Okabayashi. On December 26, 2020, Hashimoto won his fourth Yokohama Shopping Street Six-Man Tag Team title with Kamitani (who's in his fifth reign) and Yuya Aoki (who's in his first reign). On March 16, 2021, during a BJW/ZERO1 joint show, after he and Shinjiro Otani defeated Daisuke Sekimoto and Yuya Aoki in the main event, Otani gifted Hashimoto the robe his late father wore for his tenth anniversary in the business.

== Personal life ==
On June 30, 2023, Hashimoto announced in a handwritten letter to his fans that he had gotten married on March 6, 2023 (the same date as his wrestling debut) and that his first child, a son, was born on June 16, 2023.

== Championships and accomplishments ==
- Big Japan Pro Wrestling
  - BJW World Strong Heavyweight Championship (3 times)
  - BJW Tag Team Championship (3 times) – with Hideyoshi Kamitani
  - Yokohama Shopping Street 6-Man Tag Team Championship (7 times, current) – with Ryuichi Kawakami, and Hideyoshi Kamitani (1), Daisuke Sekimoto and Hideyoshi Kamitani (2), Hideyoshi Kamitani and Yuya Aoki (1), Kazumasa Yoshida and Yasufumi Nakanoue (1), and Hideyoshi Kamitani and Masaki Morihiro (1), and Joji Otani and So Daimonji (1)
  - Saikyo Tag League (2017, 2020) – with Hideyoshi Kamitani
  - Ikkitousen Strong Climb (2020)
- Toshikoshi Puroresu
  - Forget The Year! Shuffle Six Man Tag Tournament (2021) – with Harashima and Kengo Mashimo
  - Toshiwasure! Shuffle Six Man Tag Team Tournament (2022) – with Yuki Ueno and Yuma Aoyagi
- Pro Wrestling Illustrated
  - PWI ranked him #244 of the top 500 singles wrestlers in the PWI 500 in 2017
- Tenryu Project
  - Tenryu Project World 6-Man Tag Team Championship (2 times) — with Hideyoshi Kamitani and Kazuki Hashimoto (1) and Hikaru Sato and Sushi (1)
- Tokyo Sports
  - Newcomer Award (2012)
- Wrestling Observer Newsletter
  - Rookie of the Year (2011)
