= List of Pro Wrestling Zero1 personnel =

This is a list of professional wrestlers who are currently competing in Pro Wrestling Zero1, a Japanese professional wrestling promotion. Through a relationship with the Marvelous That's Women Pro Wrestling joshi puroresu promotion, Zero1 also has a division for female wrestlers. This list contains signed wrestlers as well as freelancers which make sporadic appearances for the promotion.

== Roster ==
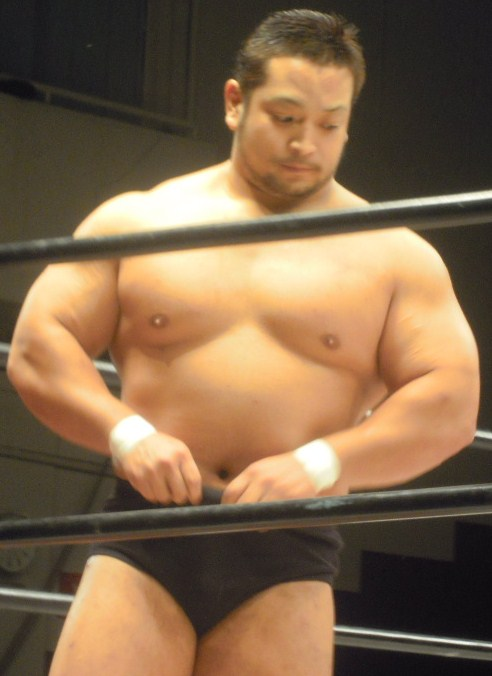
Daisuke Sekimoto

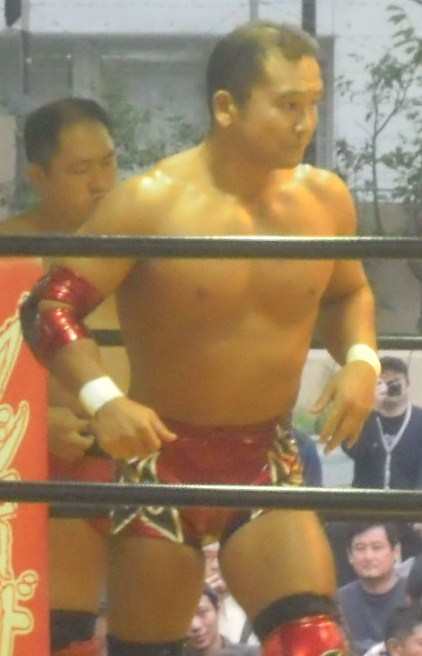
Masato Tanaka

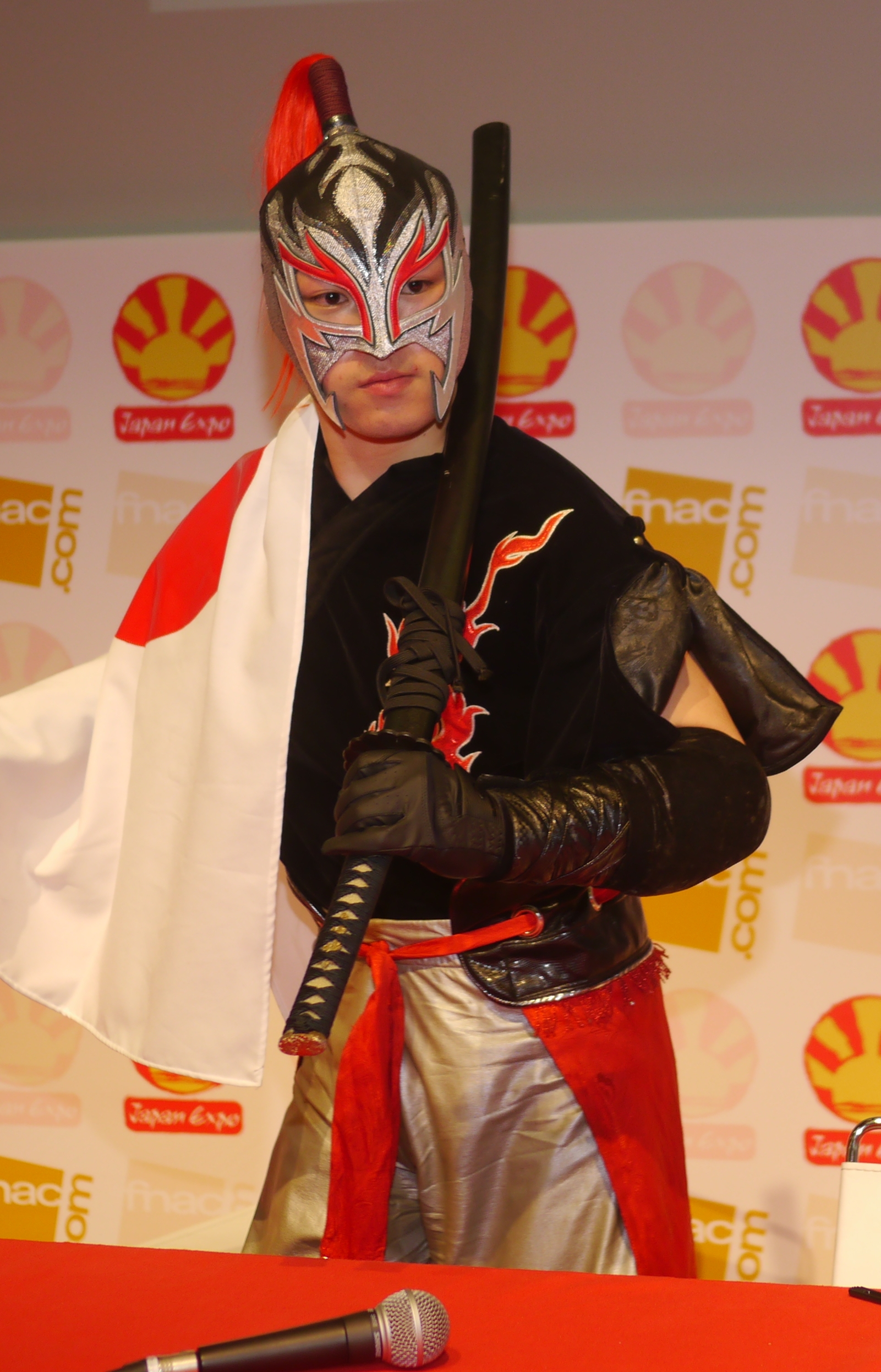
Sugi

=== Heavyweight wrestlers ===
Ring name	Real name	Notes
Akitoshi Saito	Unknown	Retired
Chris Vice	Unknown	Freelancer; NWA United National Heavyweight Champion
Daichi Hashimoto	Daichi Hashimoto	Big Japan Pro Wrestling
Daisuke Sekimoto	Daisuke Sekimoto	Big Japan Pro Wrestling
Hartley Jackson	Hartley Jackson	
Hide Kubota	Unknown	Intercontinental Tag Team Champion
Hideki Suzuki	Hideki Suzuki	Freelancer
Hideyoshi Kamitani	Hideyoshi Kamitani	Big Japan Pro Wrestling
Katsuhiko Nakajima	Katsuhiko Nakajima	Freelancer; Gleat
Masato Tanaka	Masato Tanaka	Co-Vice President
Shigehiro Irie	Shigehiro Irie	Big Japan Pro Wrestling
Shogun Okamoto	Masayuki Okamoto	Freelancer
Super Tiger	Yuji Sakuragi	Real Japan Pro Wrestling
Taru	Yoshikazu Taru	Freelancer
Towa Iwasaki	Towa Iwasaki	
Yasu Kubota	Unknown	Intercontinental Tag Team Champion
Yoshikazu Yokoyama	Yoshikazu Yokoyama	
Yuji Hino	Yusuke Hino	
Yuji Okabayashi	Yuji Okabayashi	Big Japan Pro Wrestling
Takashi Sugiura	Takashi Sugiura	Pro Wrestling Noah

=== Junior heavyweight wrestlers ===
Ring name	Real name	Notes
Astroman	Genta Hiriki	
Andy Wu	Chihiro Mizuki	Freelancer
Carbell Ito	Kazumasa Ito	Freelancer
Cima	Nobuhiko Oshima	Freelancer; Gleat
El Lindaman	Yuga Hayashi	Freelancer; Gleat
Fuminori Abe	Fuminori Abe	Pro-Wrestling Basara
Hayabusa	Shingo Suzuki	
Junya Matsunaga	Junya Matsunaga	
Isami Kodaka	Isami Kodaka	Pro-Wrestling Basara
Kota Sekifuda	Kota Sekifuda	Freelancer; Big Japan Pro Wrestling
Leo Isaka	Unknown	Freelancer; Marvelous That's Women Pro Wrestling
Masamune	Unknown	
Naoshi Sano	Unknown	
Shinjiro Otani	Shinjiro Otani	Chairman of the Board
Raicho	Unknown	
Shoki Kitamura	Shoki Kitamura	
Sugi	Takuya Sugi	
Takumi Baba	Unknown	World Junior Heavyweight Champion; International Junior Heavyweight Champion
Tatsuya Hanami	Unknown	Freelancer; Active Advance Pro Wrestling
Takuya Sugawara	Takuya Sugawara	
The Great Sasuke	Masanori Murakawa	Michinoku Pro-Wrestling
T-Hawk	Takuya Onodera	Freelancer
Van Vert Jack	Unknown	International Lightweight Tag Team Championship
Yuko Miyamoto	Yuko Miyamoto	666
Yumehito Imanari	Yumehito Imanari	
Yuya Aoki	Yuya Aoki	Big Japan Pro Wrestling

=== Female wrestlers ===
Ring name	Real name	Notes
Aja Kong	Erika Shishido	Oz Academy
Asuka	Unknown	Freelancer
Chigusa Nagayo	Chigusa Nagayo	Marvelous
Kaoru	Kaoru Maeda	Marvelous
Mio Momono	Mio Momono	Marvelous
Rin Kadokura	Kazumi Sugiura	Marvelous
Hibiki	Meiko Tanaka	Marvelous
Takumi Iroha	Airi Takubo	Marvelous
Mikoto Shindo	Unknown	Marvelous
Maria	Unknown	Marvelous
Tomoko Watanabe	Tomoko Watanabe	Marvelous
Yuki Shizuku	Yuki Shizuku	Marvelous

== Other personnel ==
=== Corporate ===
Name	Notes
Katsumi Sasazaki	Representative Director and President
Sasazaki	Auditor
Maki Yuhara	Managing Director
Matazo Mimata	General Manager
Yoshiya Okita	Sales Manager

== Notable alumni/guests ==
=== Male ===
- Akebono
- Alexander Otsuka
- "brother" Yasshi
- Craig Classic
- CW Anderson
- Daichi Hashimoto
- Daisuke Sekimoto
- Damian Slater
- Drew Parker
- Gerard Gordeau
- Hideki Suzuki
- Hirotaka Yokoi
- HUB
- James Raideen
- Jason Lee
- Jon Heidenreich
- Jonathan Gresham
- Kai
- Kamikaze
- Katsuhisa Fujii
- Kazuhiko Ogasawara
- Kazumasa Yoshida
- Kazumi Kikuta
- Kazunari Murakami
- Keiji Sakoda^{†}
- King Joe / Samoa Joe
- Leonardo Spanky
- Low Ki
- Manabu Nakanishi
- Masakatsu Funaki
- Matt Ghaffari
- Maximum Capacity^{†}
- Mei Seira
- Mineo Fujita
- Minoru Fujita
- Naohiro Hoshikawa
- Naoya Ogawa
- Nathan Jones
- The Predator
- Robbie Eagles
- Ryoji Sai
- Ryota Nakatsu
- Shane Mercer
- Shinya Hashimoto^{†}
- Skulu^{†}
- Sonjay Dutt
- Sterling James Keenan
- Steve Corino
- Takao Omori
- Tank Nagai
- Tom Howard
- Toshiaki Kawada
- Tsuyoshi Kikuchi
- Wataru Sakata
- Yoshiaki Fujiwara
- Yoshihiro Takayama
- Yuki Ishikawa
- Yuji Nagata
- Yusaku Obata
- Zeus

=== Female ===
- Akane Fujita
- Aoi Kizuki
- Ayame Sasamura
- Chie Ozora
- Giulia
- Kaoru Ito
- Mochi Miyagi
- Ram Kaicho
- Rina Shingaki
- Yuhi

== See also ==
- List of professional wrestlers
