= Craig Classic =

American professional wrestler

Personal information
- Born: Craig Cohn; May 1, 1983 (age 43) Manhasset, New York, U.S.

Professional wrestling career
- Ring name(s): Classic Kid; Craig; Craig Classic; Dragon Warrior; Ryan Billington
- Billed height: 5 ft 7 in (1.70 m)
- Billed weight: 188 lb (85 kg)
- Trained by: Antonio Banks; Big Tilly; Bruno Sassi; Daisuke Sekimoto; Ikuto Hidaka; Masada; Men's Teioh; Norman Smiley; Pablo Marquez; Rusty Brooks; Ryan O'Reilly; Soulman Alex G Tatsuhito Takaiwa; Yoshihito Sasaki
- Debut: June 18, 2005

Craig Cohn (born May 1, 1983) is an American professional wrestler, better known by the ring name Craig Classic. Cohn was initially trained at the Big Japan Pro Wrestling (BJW) dojo by Daisuke Sekimoto and has spent most of his career working in Japan, signing a contract with Pro Wrestling Zero1 in January 2012. He quit Zero1 in October 2013, after which he renamed himself Classic Kid. He has also achieved some success in the United States, most notably winning the NWA World Junior Heavyweight Championship in November 2010.

== Professional wrestling career ==
=== Early career ===
In 2004, Cohn was invited to train under Daisuke Sekimoto at the dojo of the Big Japan Pro Wrestling (BJW) promotion, becoming the first gaijin (non-Japanese) wrestler trained by the dojo. While Sekimoto worked as the head trainer of the dojo, Cohn also trained under other BJW wrestlers such as Men's Teioh, Tatsuhito Takaiwa and Yoshihito Sasaki. Upon his return to the United States, Cohn continued his training seven days a week under Soulman Alex G, eventually making his debut under the ring name Ryan Billington on June 18, 2005, facing Chasyn Rance at a Four Star Championship Wrestling event in Boca Raton, Florida. Afterwards, Cohn began working on the Floridian independent circuit under a mask and the ring name Dragon Warrior. Meanwhile, he also continued his training under the likes of Antonio Banks, Big Tilly, Bruno Sassi, Masada, Norman Smiley, Pablo Marquez, Rusty Brooks and Ryan O'Reilly. In 2005 and 2006, Cohn made several non-wrestling appearances for Total Nonstop Action Wrestling (TNA), portraying a security guard. In early 2006, Cohn returned to Japan and on April 2 made his in-ring debut for BJW. Unmasked, but deciding not to use his real last name, Cohn began working just as "Craig", teaming with Katsumasa Inoue in a tag team match, where they were defeated by Jaki Numazawa and Saburo Inematsu. During the tour, which lasted until May 5, Cohn worked against top BJW workers such as Abdullah Kobayashi and Men's Teioh, but was unable to pick up a win. Cohn returned to BJW the following August and, on August 18, picked up his first win in the promotion, when he pinned Shinobu in a six-man tag team match, where he, Men's Teioh and Onryo faced Shinobu, Hiroyuki Kondo and Yuko Miyamoto. After his second tour concluded in October, Cohn returned for his third tour of the promotion in December 2006. Cohn continued making regular tours of BJW throughout 2007 and the first half of 2008. On April 27, 2007, Cohn also made his debut for women's wrestling promotion Ice Ribbon, losing to Hisakatsu Oya in a singles match.

When not working in Japan, Cohn worked for various independent promotions in Southeastern United States, having now abandoned the Dragon Warrior persona and adopted the ring name Craig Classic, which he had taken from his trainer Daisuke Sekimoto, who had called him a "classic wrestler". On July 28, 2007, Classic won his first professional wrestling title, the Division-1 Pro Wrestling (D1PW) Cruiserweight Championship. On September 26, 2008, Classic entered the 2008 Jeff Peterson Memorial Cup, but was defeated in his opening round match by Gran Akuma. On October 23, 2009, Classic defeated Chris Jones for the NWA Florida Junior Heavyweight Championship. He followed that up by defeating Mike Quackenbush on November 6, 2010, for the NWA World Junior Heavyweight Championship, ending Quackenbush's three-and-a-half-year reign. As a result of winning NWA's top junior heavyweight title, Classic relinquished the lower-ranked NWA Florida title. On December 3, Classic took part in the 2010 Jeff Peterson Memorial Cup, where, after a win over Lince Dorado, he was eliminated in the following day's quarterfinals by Arik Cannon.

=== Wrestling in Puerto Rico & Mexico (2010 - 2011) ===
Classic made several trips to Puerto Rico defending the NWA World Jr Heavyweight Championship on the Island for PRWA. His most Notable match on the Island was against Erick Scorpio in a Barbed Wire Ladder Deathmatch in Coliseo de Ensenada Guanica, PR. Classic would go on to debut in Mexico wrestling for IWL against top stars like Super Crazy, Daga and many others, Wrestling on many supercards that could be seen on IPPV.

=== Pro Wrestling Zero1 (2011–2013) ===
On March 6, 2011, Classic made his debut for the Japanese Pro Wrestling Zero1 promotion, successfully defending the NWA World Junior Heavyweight Championship against Munenori Sawa at Tokyo's Ryōgoku Kokugikan. On July 11, Classic announced that he was relinquishing the title in protest over the NWA stripping The Sheik of the NWA World Heavyweight Championship. Despite the announcement and NWA going on to crown a new champion, when Classic returned to Zero1 on October 2, 2011, he was still billed by the promotion as the NWA World Junior Heavyweight Champion as he successfully defended the title in a rematch with Munenori Sawa. After a successful title defense against Takafumi Ito on November 6, Classic lost the Zero1 version of the NWA World Junior Heavyweight Championship to Tsuyoshi Kikuchi on January 1, 2012. Five days later, Zero1 announced that Classic had signed a contract to become a regular member of the promotion's roster. During the press conference announcing the signing, Zero1 president Shinjiro Otani compared Classic to his former in-ring opponents and top gaijin wrestlers Eddie Guerrero and Pegasus Kid. On March 2, Classic represented his new home promotion against his former home promotion in a special six-man tag team match, where he, Kohei Sato and Shito Ueda defeated Big Japan Pro Wrestling representatives Kazuki Hashimoto, Takumi Tsukamoto and Yuji Okabayashi. In early 2012, Classic began teaming regularly with Ikuto Hidaka with the two also developing a double-team finishing maneuver together. The partnership built to a three-way match to determine the new NWA International Lightweight Tag Team Champions on April 24. The match, which also included the team of Mineo Fujita and Takuya Sugawara, was eventually won by Jimmy Kagetora and Jimmy Susumu. On May 13, Classic attempted to regain the NWA World Junior Heavyweight Championship as well as win the International Junior Heavyweight Championship for the first time, but was defeated by the defending double champion, Takuya Sugawara. On October 16, Classic received another shot at the NWA International Lightweight Tag Team Championship with new partner Jason New, but the two were defeated in the title match by the defending champions, Frank David and Shawn Guinness. Classic ended his 2012 with a big six-man tag team Street Fight on December 15, where he, Atsushi Onita and Masato Tanaka defeated Akebono, Mineo Fujita and Rion Mizuki.

On April 15, 2013, Classic came together with Jack Anthony, James Raideen, Jason New, Maybach β, Sebastian Concrete, Steven Walters and Tama Williams to form a gaijin stable named "New Age Wrestling Future" (NWF) under the guidance of Akebono. The stable was shortly afterwards also joined by Jonathan Gresham and Mark Coffey. Classic remained affiliated with Zero1 until quitting the promotion in October 2013.

=== Freelancing (2013–present) ===
After becoming a freelancer, Cohn adopted a new persona named "Classic Kid", based on the Pegasus Kid. He made his first appearance as the character on November 5, 2013, at a Tenryu Project event, where he and Buki were defeated by Kogata Steiners (Ryuichi Kawakami and Tank Nagai). Classic has since started working regularly for the Inoki Genome Federation (IGF). On December 2, 2014, Classic, Buki and Ryuichi Kawakami defeated Arashi, Nosawa Rongai and Ricky Fuji to win the vacant Tenryu Project 6-Man Tag Team Championship. On March 14, 2015, Classic suffered a neck injury in Florida, which led to Tenryu Project filling his spot in the 6-Man Tag Team Championship team with one-off replacements Heddi French and Hikaru Sato. Despite being injured, Classic was officially one third of the champions until August 29, 2015, when Kawakami was also injured, which led to the title being vacated.

== Championships and accomplishments ==
- Championship Wrestling Entertainment
  - CWE National Championship (1 time)
- Pro Wrestling TURBO
  - TURBO Championship (1 time, inaugural)
  - TURBO Grand Prix Tournament (2018)
- Division-1 Pro Wrestling
  - D1PW Cruiserweight Championship (1 time)
- Future of Wrestling
  - FOW International Championship (1 time)
- Independent Championship Wrestling
  - ICW Pure X Crown Championship (1 time)
- National Wrestling Alliance
  - NWA World Junior Heavyweight Championship (1 time)
- NWA Pro Wrestling Fusion
  - NWA Florida Junior Heavyweight Championship (1 time)
  - Fusion Clash 8 Three Round Gauntlet First Round Battle Royal (2009)
- Pro Wrestling Illustrated
  - PWI ranked him #305 of the top 500 singles wrestlers in the PWI 500 in 2012
- Pro Wrestling Wallabee
  - Copa De Luchas (2014)
- Pro Wrestling Zero1
  - NWA World Junior Heavyweight Championship (Zero1 version) (1 time)
- Underground Wrestling Exit
  - WUW Japan Underground Aun Championship (1 time) – with BUKI
- Puerto Rico Wrestling Association
  - PRWA Puerto Rico Junior Heavyweight Championship (1 time)
- Tenryu Project
  - Tenryu Project 6-Man Tag Team Championship (1 time) – with Buki and Ryuichi Kawakami
- Other titles
  - IPW Hardcore/PWW International Junior Heavyweight Championship (1 time)
