= International Junior Heavyweight Championship =

International Junior Heavyweight Championship may refer to:

- NWA International Junior Heavyweight Championship, originally formed as a split-off branch of the NWA World Junior Heavyweight Championship and defended mainly in All Japan Pro Wrestling
- International Junior Heavyweight Championship (Zero1)
- WAR International Junior Heavyweight Championship
