= Takumi Baba =

Japanese professional wrestler

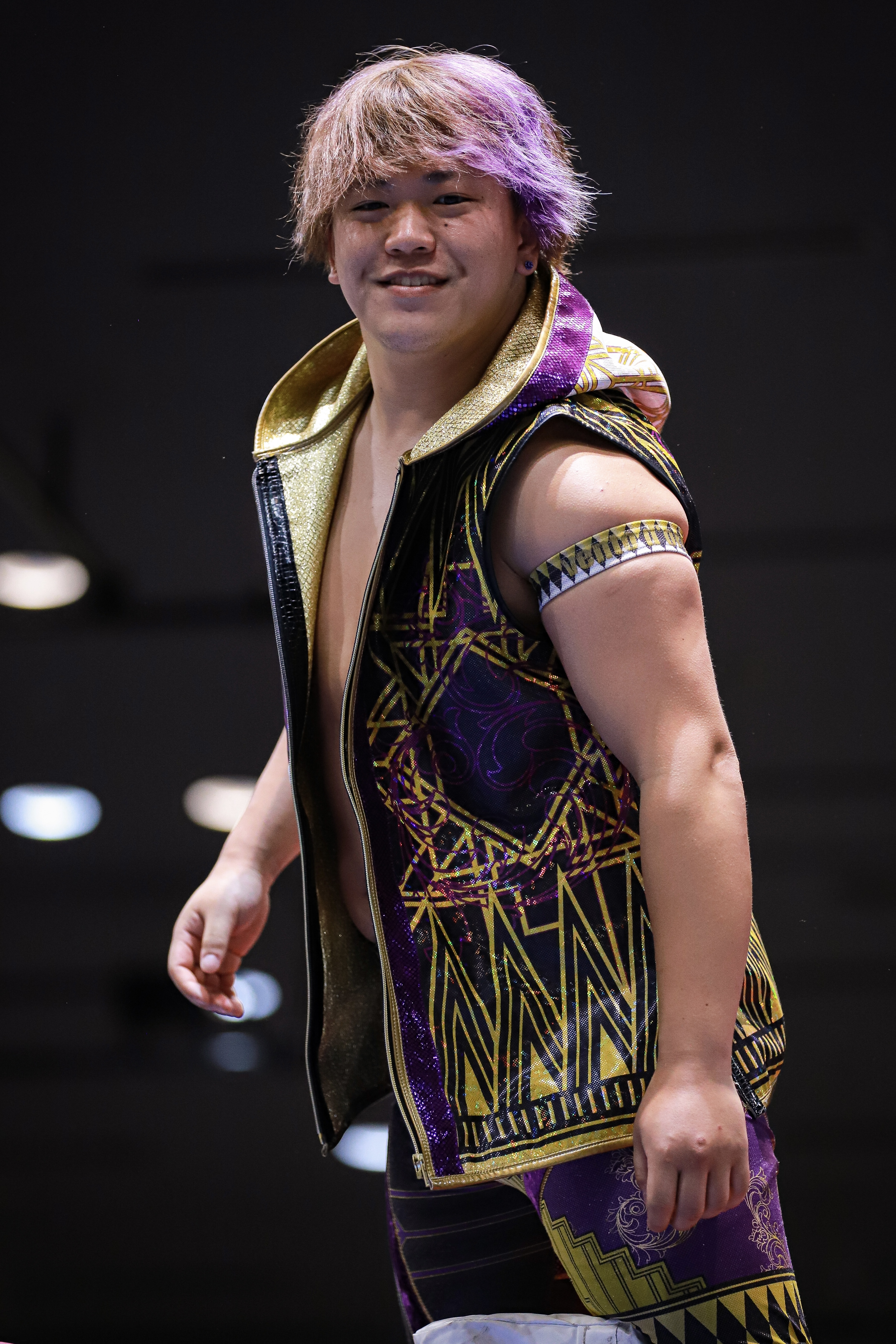
- Baba in May 2023

Personal information
- Born: March 11, 1999 (age 27) Niigata, Japan

Professional wrestling career
- Ring name: Takumi Baba
- Billed height: 172 cm (5 ft 8 in)
- Billed weight: 80 kg (176 lb)
- Debut: 2017

Takumi Baba (馬場拓海, Baba Takumi) is a Japanese professional wrestler currently signed to Pro Wrestling Zero1 where he is a World Junior and International Junior Heavyweight Champion. He is also known for his work in Wrestle-1 and in the Japanese independent scene.

== Professional wrestling career ==
=== Wrestle-1 (2017–2020) ===
Baba made his professional wrestling debut in Wrestle-1 on the second night of the W-1 WRESTLE-1 Autumn Bout 2017 from November 12, where he teamed up with Koji Doi in a losing effort against Masayuki Kono and Shuji Kondo. He continued working regularly for the company and even taking part in matches disputed for various accomplishments. At W-1 WRESTLE WARS on March 21, 2019, he competed in a rumble match for the Wrestle-1 Result Championship won by the retaining Kuma Arashi and also involving Sushi, Tsugutaka Sato, Ganseki Tanaka, Masayuki Mitomi and others. He wrestled his final match for the company on January 25, 2020, at W-1 WRESTLE-1 Wrestle Soul Vol. 3 where he teamed up with Ganseki Tanaka in a losing effort against Shoki Kitamura and Takafumi Ito.

=== Pro Wrestling Zero1 (2020–present) ===
Baba made his debut in Pro Wrestling Zero1 at ZERO1 Winter Niigata Convention ~ Dream Series Winter on February 2, 2020, where he teamed up with Ikuto Hidaka to defeat Chris Vice and Yoshikazu Yokoyama. Baba won both of the NWA World Junior Heavyweight Championship and International Junior Heavyweight Championship at Zero1 23rd Midsummer Festival on July 15, 2023, by defeating Leo Isaka. At ZERO1 2nd Kameido Tenjin Shrine Pro Wrestling, Baba competed in a battle royal won by Ryo Hoshino and also involving notable opponents, both male and female such as Aja Kong, Masato Tanaka, Takuya Sugawara, and others.

He is known for competing in one of the promotion's signature events, the Tenkaichi Junior tournament in which he made his debut at the 2021 edition, where he fell short to Junta Miyawaki in the first rounds. At the 2022 edition, Baba placed himself in the Block A of the competition where he scored a total of ten points after going against Tatsuhito Takaiwa, Takuro Niki, Andy Wu and Yasu Kubota, failing to qualify to the finals. At the 2023 edition, he fell short to Astro Black in the first rounds. Another signature tournament he has competed in is the Furinkazan, where he made his first appearance at the 2023 edition by teaming up with Takumi Saito, falling short to Rikiya Fudo and Tsugutaka Sato in the first rounds.

==== Big Japan Pro Wrestling (2020–present) ====
Baba often competed in cross-over events promoted by Zero1 and Big Japan Pro Wrestling. The first event of this kind in which he competed was BJW/ZERO1 Clash on December 4, 2020, where he teamed up with Shoki Kitamura in a losing effort against El Lindaman and Kota Sekifuda. At BJW/ZERO1/2AW Great Clash, a cross-over eventr also promoted alongside 2AW on December 24, 2021, Bab teamed up with Shoki Kitamura and Takuya Sugawara in a losing effort against Chicharito Shoki, Tomato Kaji and Shu Asakawa.

== Championships and accomplishments ==
- Pro Wrestling Zero1
  - NWA World Junior Heavyweight Championship (2 times, current)
  - International Junior Heavyweight Championship (2 times, current)
  - Junior Tag Tournament (2024) – with Takuya Sugawara
