= Astroman (wrestler) =

Japanese professional wrestler

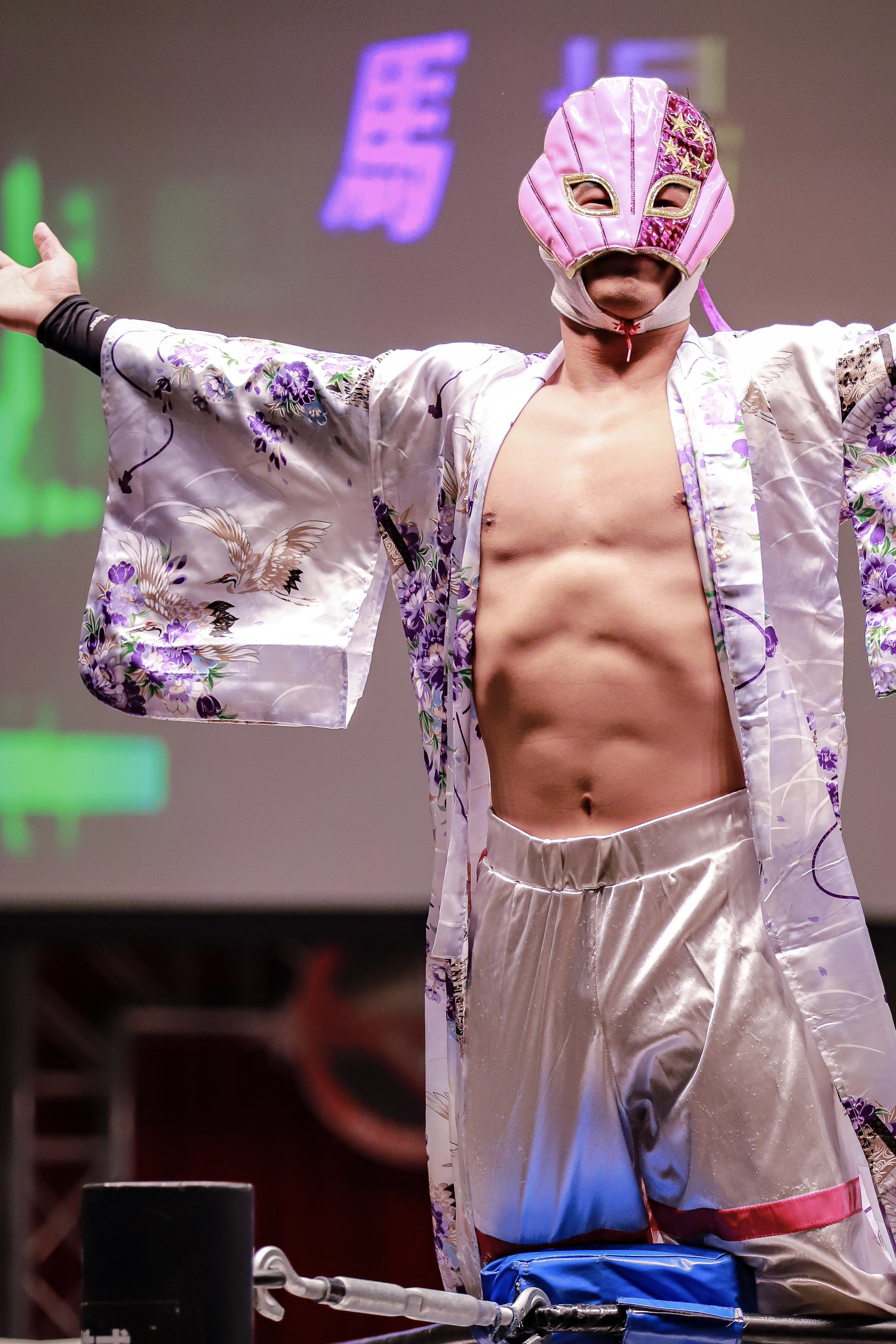
- Astroman in May 2023

Personal information
- Born: August 5, 1997 (age 28) Shimonoseki, Japan

Professional wrestling career
- Ring name(s): Genta Hiriki; Astroman; Astro
- Billed height: 173 cm (5 ft 8 in)
- Billed weight: 83 kg (183 lb)
- Debut: 2021

Genta Hiriki (ヒリキ源太, Hiriki Genta), better known by his ring name Astroman, is a Japanese professional wrestler. He currently performs in the Japanese promotion Pro Wrestling Zero1 where he is a former World Junior Heavyweight Champion and International Junior Heavyweight Champion.

== Professional wrestling career ==
=== Independent circuit (2021–present) ===
Due to partially being a freelancer, Hiriki is known for competing in various promotions of the Japanese independent scene. He took part in the 2021 Advance Cup, a tournament hosted by Active Advance Pro Wrestling in which he competed in a block where he failed to score any points after going against Naka Shuma, Takuro Niki and Chicharito Shoki. On the finals of the event from May 5, 2021, he teamed up with Shoki Kitamura in a losing effort against Ayumu Honda and The Andrew King Takuma in a tag team match. He is also known for seldom competing in various joshi promotions as male talent. At Diana Jaguar's Memorial 61st Birthday & 46th Anniversary, an event promoted by World Woman Pro-Wrestling Diana on July 25, 2022, he teamed up with Ryo Hoshino, Shoki Kitamura and Tsugutaka Sato in a losing effort against Junya Matsunaga, Satsuki Nagao, Takafumi and Takumi Baba in an eight-man tag team match.

=== Pro Wrestling Zero1 (2021–present) ===
Hiriki made his professional wrestling debut in Pro Wrestling Zero1 at ZERO1 Great East Japan Earthquake Reconstruction Charity Show on March 11, 2021, where he fell short to Shoki Kitamura in singles competition. During his time in the company, he chased various championships promoted by it. At ZERO1 20th & 21st Anniversary on April 10, 2022, Hiriki defeated Fuminori Abe to win both the World Junior Heavyweight Championship and the International Junior Heavyweight Championship which were sanctioned together. Hiriki competed in various match gimmicks, such as a battle royal which took place at ZERO1 Earthquake Disaster Reconstruction Dedication Pro-Wrestling on August 26, 2022, a bout won by Shoki Kitamura and also involving notable opponents, both male and female such as Aja Kong, Masato Tanaka, Takuya Sugawara and others.

Hiriki is known for competing in one of the promotion's signature events, the Tenkaichi Junior tournament, in which he made his first appearance at the 2021 edition, where he fell short to Leo Isaka in the first rounds. At the 2022 edition, he placed himself in the Block B, where he scored a total of eight points after competing against Shoki Kitamura, Jun Masaoka, Leo Isaka and Yoshikazu Yokoyama.

==== Big Japan Pro Wrestling (2021–present) ====
One of the promotions he often uses to compete for due to Zero1's shared developmental talent is Big Japan Pro Wrestling. He usually performs in cross over events. One of these junctures was the BJW/ZERO1/2AW Big Clash from April 7, 2021, where he teamed up with Hartley Jackson and Shoki Kitamura in a losing effort against Naka Shuma, Ryuji Ito and Taishi Takizawa as a result of a six-man tag team match. He continued to make appearances in various anniversary events such as the BJW Daichi Hashimoto 10th Anniversary from December 12, 2021, where he teamed up with Satsuki Nagao in a losing effort against Kazuki Hashimoto and Kosuke Sato.

== Championships and accomplishments ==
- Pro Wrestling Zero1
  - NWA World Junior Heavyweight Championship (1 time)
  - International Junior Heavyweight Championship (1 time)
