= NWA International Junior Heavyweight Championship =

Professional wrestling championship

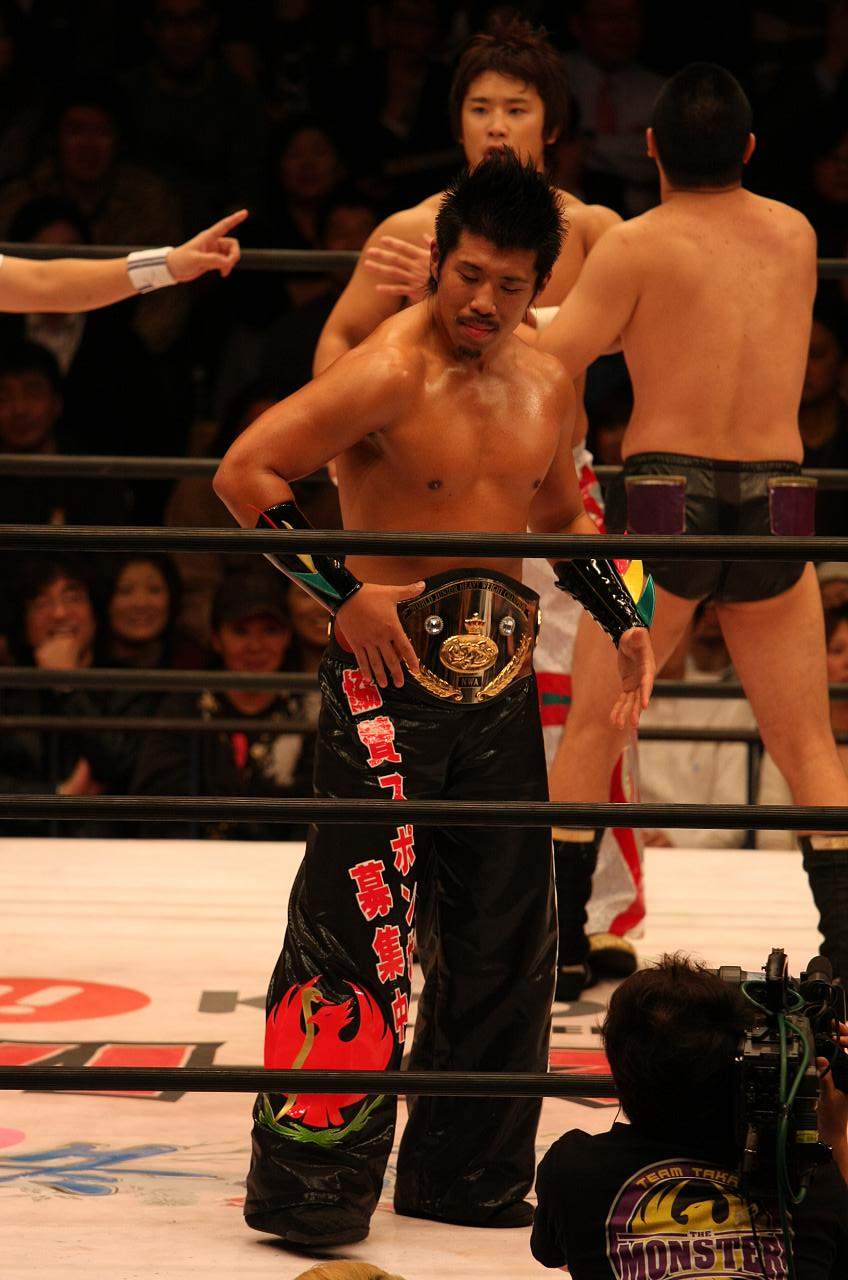
- Hajime Ohara wearing the belt in 2008

Details
- Promotion: National Wrestling Alliance; New Japan Pro-Wrestling; All Japan Pro Wrestling; Toryumon Mexico; Dradition
- Date established: December 10, 1979
- Date retired: March 16, 2014

Other names
- World Junior Heavyweight Championship; NWA Junior Heavyweight Championship; Junior Heavyweight Championship; International Junior Heavyweight Championship
Statistics
- First champion: Steve Keirn
- Final champion: Último Dragón
- Most reigns: Atsushi Onita and Chavo Guerrero (3 reigns)
- Longest reign: Último Dragón (1,336 days)
- Shortest reign: Dynamite Kid (5 days)

The NWA International Junior Heavyweight Championship (Japanese: NWAインターナショナル・ジュニアヘビー級王座, Hepburn: NWA Intānashonaru Junia Hebī-kyū Ōza) was a professional wrestling junior heavyweight championship. It was established in 1979 by a split in lineage from the NWA World Junior Heavyweight Championship caused by the retirement of champion Nelson Royal the same year. The first champion, Steve Keirn, was recognized as world champion only by Championship Wrestling From Florida, NWA Hollywood Wrestling and New Japan Pro-Wrestling (NJPW). This version was eventually taken to NJPW by Tatsumi Fujinami in 1980, then to All Japan Pro Wrestling between 1982 and 1986. It was revived in 2007 in Toryumon Mexico and brought back to Japan soon after where it was defended in Michinoku Pro Wrestling and Dradition.

There have been a total of 23 reigns shared among 17 wrestlers. Although it was never officially retired, it has been considered dormant since 2014 with Último Dragón being the last title holder.

== History ==
=== National Wrestling Alliance ===
In the National Wrestling Alliance (NWA), the NWA World Junior Heavyweight Championship had been entrusted entirely to Leroy McGuirk, a promoter based in the Oklahoma territory, which made it difficult to arrange title matches outside McGuirk's promotional territory. McGuirk's monopolization of the title was considered a problem though title matches outside his territory were not entirely unheard of. In Japan, such title matches included Danny Hodge vs. Hiro Matsuda in 1967, Ken Mantell vs. Jumbo Tsuruta in 1974, and Matsuda vs. Mighty Inoue in 1975. Consequently, New Japan Pro-Wrestling's Hisashi Shinma, along with promoters then considered part of the NWA's "anti-mainstream" faction — World Wrestling Federation's Vince McMahon, Championship Wrestling from Florida's Eddie Graham, and NWA Hollywood Wrestling's Mike LeBell — worked together to plan a new management structure for the NWA World Junior Heavyweight title. In Japan, McGuirk's monopolization was long treated as the accepted explanation for the new title's creation, but Shinma stated in a later interview that he had for some time been planning to have Tatsumi Fujinami challenge for the NWA World Junior Heavyweight Championship, and had intended to enter Fujinami in a tournament to fill the then-vacant title, but a dispute broke out between McGuirk, who managed the title, and booker Bill Watts (who later broke away from McGuirk to found a new promotion), leaving the tournament plan in limbo. As a result, Shinma joined with other influential NWA figures (the above-mentioned "anti-mainstream" group) to create a new world title.

In 1979, following the retirement of champion Nelson Royal, the anti-mainstream faction held a title decision match on December 10 at Hollywood Wrestling's home base in Los Angeles between Steve Keirn and Chavo Guerrero. Keirn defeated Guerrero and was recognized as the new champion (though this title match is considered fictional in terms of its legitimacy). However, McGuirk objected and on February 11, 1980, held his own title tournament in Oklahoma, recognizing Ron Starr as champion, resulting in a period where two competing "NWA World Junior Heavyweight Championships" coexisted. Ultimately, McGuirk's faction's title was recognized as legitimate, and the title newly created by the anti-mainstream faction was recognized as a separate junior heavyweight title, named the NWA World Junior Heavyweight International Championship, distinct from McGuirk's official title.

=== New Japan Pro-Wrestling ===
On February 1, 1980, Fujinami — then WWF Junior Heavyweight Champion — defeated Keirn in a double title match in Sapporo, becoming the holder of both the NWA World Junior Heavyweight International Championship and the WWF Junior Heavyweight Championship. However, in July he vacated the NWA title due to an injury (a fractured right pinky finger). On July 23, in Kitakyushu, Kengo Kimura became the new champion by defeating Bret Hart in a title decision match, but he lost the title to Guerrero on October 3 at the Kuramae Kokugikan.

=== All Japan Pro Wrestling ===
Guerrero brought the title with him to All Japan Pro Wrestling (AJPW) in August 1981 (at the time, NJPW and AJPW were in the thick of a talent-raiding war over foreign wrestlers). Atsushi Onita won the title from Guerrero on March 7, 1982, in Charlotte, North Carolina, then lost it to Sangre Chicana in Guadalajara before quickly winning it back and returning to Japan. Because of this, the title's lineage shifted from NJPW to AJPW, and AJPW took over management of the championship as well. However, at a title match between Onita and Guerrero on July 30 at the Kawasaki City Gymnasium, a German suplex hold by Guerrero resulted in a controversial ruling of a "double pinfall, with both men's shoulders down," awarding Onita the successful defense, and the title was placed in NWA custody. At the NWA convention held in San Juan, Puerto Rico on August 30 and 31, the organization decided to scrap the poorly managed junior heavyweight title system altogether in light of the confusion it had caused fans, and to establish instead a new NWA International Junior Heavyweight Championship, dropping "World" from the name. Management of this title, along with the two existing International titles (Heavyweight and Tag Team), was to be entrusted on a semi-permanent basis to AJPW and its governing body, the Pacific Wrestling Federation, going forward. This account of the decision came from Giant Baba, who had attended the convention. However, around the same time, Tiger Mask had already taken the NWA World Junior Heavyweight Championship from Les Thornton in NJPW and was actively defending it as champion, which caused controversy. The matter was addressed during a live broadcast of "World Pro Wrestling" on September 17, 1982, when announcer Ichiro Furudate acknowledged that some media outlets had mistakenly reported that the NWA had handed all authority over the junior heavyweight division to AJPW. Referring to what he described as minutes from the NWA convention, he explained that the NWA's Title Committee had officially recognized Tiger Mask as the reigning junior heavyweight champion and had spoken highly of him as a wrestler deserving renewed endorsement. He further noted that Jim Barnett had sent a telex to NJPW expressing concern over the erroneous reports, and relayed that Hisashi Shinma, who had also attended the NWA convention, had clarified that the title held by AJPW was essentially a proprietary championship belonging to that promotion alone, whereas the title held by Tiger Mask was the genuine NWA-sanctioned World Junior Heavyweight Championship. Furudate's broadcast concluded on the basis that Tiger Mask's title represented the true NWA lineage. Meanwhile, Les Thornton, who had lost the title to Tiger Mask, claimed to have won a fictitious title tournament said to have taken place in Manila, Philippines, in November 1983, and once again began claiming the NWA World Junior Heavyweight Championship in the Georgia territory, even defending it there. This resulted in a situation where two NWA World Junior Heavyweight Championships coexisted simultaneously — one in Japan and one in the United States. However, NJPW did not strongly assert that its own title was the legitimate one or that Thornton's title was invalid, nor did it defend its title overseas; as a result, the two titles continued to coexist in an unresolved, ambiguous state until NJPW eventually vacated the championship at a later date. Ultimately AJPW backed down, and the dispute was resolved with NJPW managing the World Junior Heavyweight Championship and AJPW managing a separately recognized International Junior Heavyweight Championship.

The belt's design was changed to resemble a combination of the previous International Heavyweight and International Tag Team title belts, and under its new name — the NWA International Junior Heavyweight Championship, no longer mixing "World" and "International" as its predecessor had. The vacancy was settled through a three-match series between Onita and Guerrero held under NWA instruction. Onita won the first match, Guerrero won the second, and Onita took the decisive third match, winning the series 2-1 to become champion. Onita later vacated the title due to a knee injury, and Guerrero reclaimed it by winning the resulting tournament. The championship was then held by Mighty Inoue, Dynamite Kid, and Kuniaki Kobayashi before Tiger Mask II defeated Kobayashi and subsequently vacated the belt in March 1986 upon moving up to the heavyweight division. Shortly afterward, AJPW withdrew from the NWA altogether and relinquished its management rights over the title. From July of that year, the physical belt was reborn as AJPW and PWF's own World Junior Heavyweight Championship.

=== Revival ===
Nearly 20 years after Tiger Mask II vacated the title, on March 4, 2007, an "NWA International Junior Heavyweight Championship Tournament" was held in Mexico City. In the final, Hirooki Goto defeated Shocker to be recognized as the new champion. Formally, this was treated as a revived championship, but AJPW and the PWF were not involved in this revival. Between 2008 and 2010 the championship was mostyly defended in Dradition. Later, when champion Último Dragón appeared for AJPW, he brought the belt and proposed a unification match with the World Junior Heavyweight Championship, but this never took place. On March 16, 2014, Último Dragón successfully defended the title for a third time against Rey Bucanero at Toryumon Mexico's Fiesta Yamaha event in Mexico City. The title has remained inactive ever since.

== Reigns ==
Key
No.	Overall reign number
Reign	Reign number for the specific champion
Days	Number of days held
N/A	Unknown information

No.	Champion	Championship change			Reign statistics		Notes	Ref.
No.	Champion	Date	Event	Location	Reign	Days	Notes	Ref.
1	Steve Keirn	December 10, 1979	Live event	Los Angeles, California	1	53	Defeated Chavo Guerrero in a decision match to be recognized as World Junior Heavyweight Champion in Florida and Los Angeles.	
2	Tatsumi Fujinami	February 1, 1980	Live event	Sapporo, Japan	1	14	Also held the WWF Junior Heavyweight Championship, but defended them separately.	
3	Mike Graham	February 15, 1980	Live event	Hollywood, Florida	1	49		
4	Tatsumi Fujinami	April 4, 1980	Live event	Kawasaki, Japan	2	89		
—	Vacated	July 2, 1980	—	—	—	—	Fujinami was injured and unable to defend the championship.	
5	Kengo Kimura	July 23, 1980	Live event	Kita Kyushu, Japan	1	72	Defeated Bret Hart in a decision match.	
6	Chavo Guerrero	October 3, 1980 (Note: Date alternatively given as November 3.)	Live event	Tokyo, Japan	1	147	This title change was via countout.	
7	Gino Hernandez	February 27, 1981	Live event	Houston, Texas	1	153		
8	Chavo Guerrero	July 30, 1981	Live event	Houston, Texas	2	220		
9	Atsushi Onita	March 7, 1982	Live event	Charlotte, North Carolina	1	35	Additionally recognized as international champion in Jim Crockett Promotions.	
10	Sangre Chicana	April 11, 1982	Live event	Guadalajara, Jalisco, Mexico	1	19	Additionally recognized as world champion in Empresa Mexicana de Lucha Libre.	
11	Atsushi Onita	April 30, 1982	Live event	Mexico City, Mexico	2	91		
—	Vacated	July 30, 1982	—	—	—	—	Vacated after a match against Chavo Guerrero that ended in a no decision.	
12	Atsushi Onita	November 4, 1982	Live event	Tokyo, Japan	3	162	Defeated Chavo Guerrero in rematch. The National Wrestling Alliance and All Japan Pro Wrestling rename the title the "NWA International Junior Heavyweight Championship" during this reign.	
—	Vacated	April 15, 1983	—	—	—	—	Vacated after Onita broke his leg during a match against Hector Guerrero.	
13	Chavo Guerrero	May 26, 1983	Live event	Tenryu, Japan	3	276	Defeated Ultra Seven (Masahiko Takasugi) in tournament final.	
14	Mighty Inoue	February 26, 1984	Live event	Osaka, Japan	1	468		
15	Dynamite Kid	June 8, 1985	Live event	Takamatsu, Kagawa, Japan	1	5		
16	Kuniaki Kobayashi	June 13, 1985	Live event	Koga, Ibaraki, Japan	1	79		
17	Tiger Mask (II)	August 31, 1985	Live event	Tokyo, Japan	1	(Note: The exact date the championship was vacated is uncertain, which means the championship reign lasted between 274 and 303 days.)		
—	Vacated	June 1986	—	—	—	—	Vacated when Tiger Mask moved to the heavyweight division. The title was replaced with the AJPW World Junior Heavyweight Championship.	
18	Hirooki Goto	March 4, 2007	Live event	Mexico City, Mexico	1	187	Defeated Shocker in a tournament final to revive the title for Toryumon Mexico and was awarded the pre-1982 belt.	
—	Vacated	September 7, 2007	—	—	—	—	Vacated when Goto graduates to the heavyweight division.	
19	Super Delfin	November 9, 2008	Ascending Current 3 Night 1	Osaka, Japan	1	13	Defeated Último Dragón to win the vacant title. Tatsunami Fujinami was a special guest referee.	
20	Último Dragón	November 22, 2008	Ascending Current 3 Night 4	Tokyo, Japan	1	22		
21	Hajime Ohara	December 14, 2008	Live event	Mexico City, Mexico	1	291		
22	Mineo Fujita	October 1, 2009	Dream Impact IV	Tokyo, Japan	1	291		
23	Último Dragón	July 19, 2010	Lucha Fiesta 2010	Tokyo, Japan	2	1,336	This was a three-way match also involving Hajime Ohara. On December 15, 2013, Último Dragón also won AJPW's World Junior Heavyweight Championship but he defended the titles separately.	
—	Deactivated	March 16, 2014	—	—	—	—	The championship has been dormant since Último Dragón's last recorded defence against Rey Bucanero.	

== See also ==
- List of National Wrestling Alliance championships
- NWA World Junior Heavyweight Championship
- International Junior Heavyweight Championship (Zero1)
- NWA World Junior Heavyweight Championship (Zero1)
- Zero1 USA World Junior Heavyweight Championship
- NWA X Championship
- WCW Cruiserweight Championship
- WWA International Cruiserweight Championship
- NWA World Junior Heavyweight Championship (Los Angeles version)
