= Dradition =

Japanese professional wrestling promotion

Dradition Pro-Wrestling
- Acronym: Dradition
- Founded: August 2006
- Headquarters: Tokyo, Japan
- Founder: Tatsumi Fujinami
- Owner: Tatsumi Fujinami
- Formerly: Muga World Pro Wrestling (2006–2008)
- Split from: New Japan Pro-Wrestling
- Website: https://www.dradition.jp/

Dradition Pro-Wrestling (Japanese: ドラディション, Hepburn: Doradishon; Dradition for short) is an independent Japanese professional wrestling promotion that, until 2008, was known as Muga World Pro Wrestling (無我ワールド・プロレスリング, Muga Wārudo Puroresuringu). The promotion was founded by and is owned by puroresu legend Tatsumi Fujinami, who has owned and operated it since its creation in August 2006.

The name of the promotion is a portmanteau of the words "tradition" and "dragon": the first term refers to the type of traditional wrestling promoted by Dradition, the so-called Inoki's "strong style", the second one is referred to Fujinami's nickname "The Dragon".

They run, on average, one show every 2–3 months and feature their talent as well as participation from other promotions including Dramatic Dream Team, Ice Ribbon and SMASH, usually freelancers but now & then with participation from the major federations. Some of their talent frequently appears elsewhere as well.

== Championships ==
Championship	Current champion(s)	Date won	Previous Champion	Reference
NWA International Junior Heavyweight Championship	Ultimo Dragon	19 July 2010	Mineo Fujita	

== Roster ==
- Hiro Saito
- Leona
- Mitsuya Nagai
- Nobuyuki Kurashima
- Tatsumi Fujinami

=== Guests ===
- Daisuke Sekimoto
- Yukio Sakaguchi
- Tiger Mask III
- Nosawa Rongai
- Emi Sakura
- Mark Mercedes

== See also ==
- Professional wrestling in Japan
- List of professional wrestling promotions in Japan
