= Shoki Kitamura =

Japanese professional wrestler

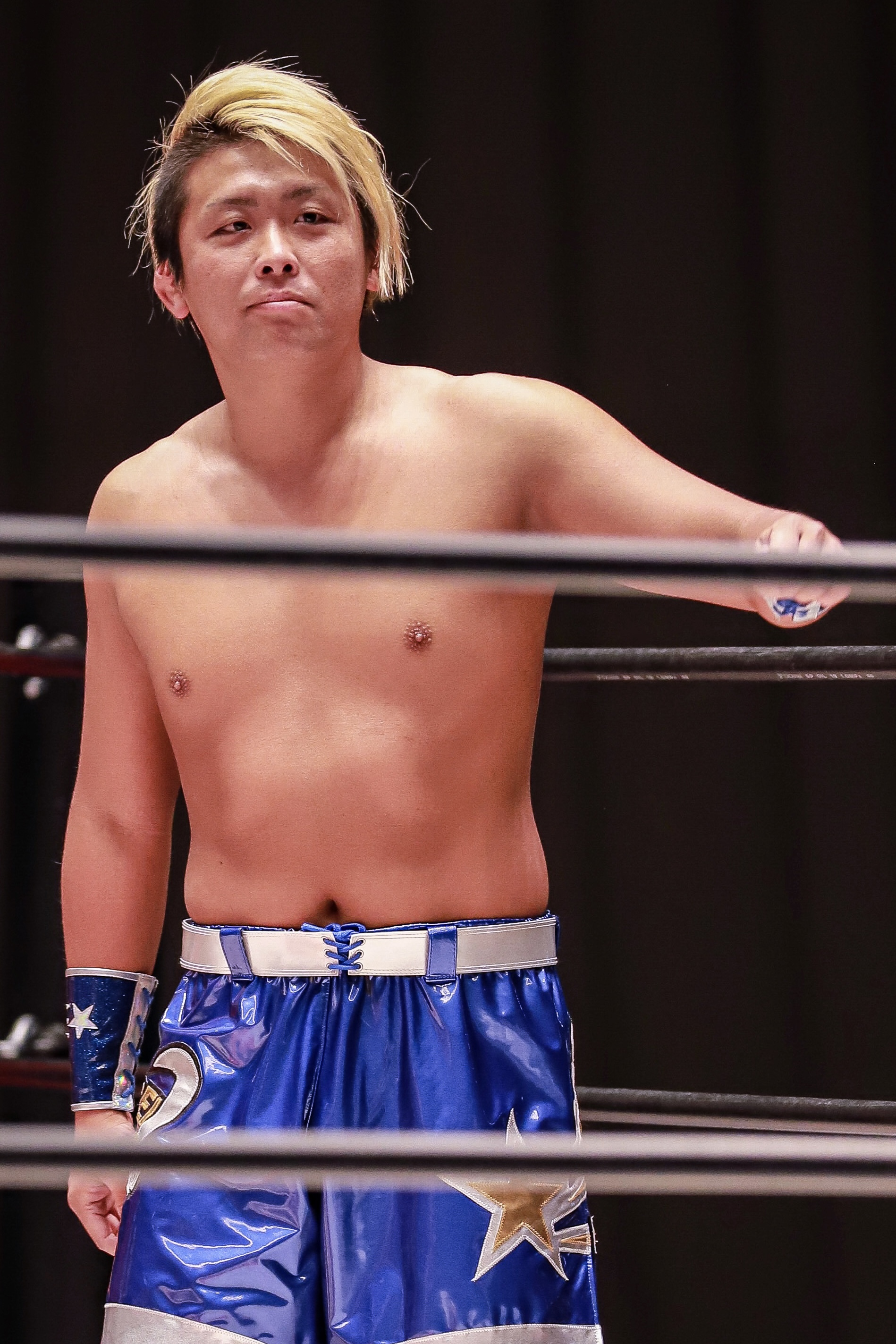
- Kitamura in May 2023

Personal information
- Born: March 28, 1997 (age 29) Hirono, Japan

Professional wrestling career
- Ring name: Shoki Kitamura
- Billed height: 174 cm (5 ft 9 in)
- Billed weight: 90 kg (198 lb)
- Debut: 2017

Shoki Kitamura (北村彰基, Kitamura Shōki) is a Japanese professional wrestler who performs for the Japanese promotion Pro Wrestling Zero1. He is a former World Junior Heavyweight Champion and International Junior Heavyweight Champion.

== Professional wrestling career ==
=== Independent circuit (2017–present) ===
As a partial freelancer, Kitamura has competed in various promotions on the Japanese independent scene. He made his professional wrestling debut at Pro-Wrestling ACE Vol. 6, an event promoted by Wrestle-1 on July 2, 2017, where he wrestled Tsugutaka Sato to a time-limit draw in a dark match. At JTO Itadaki, an event promoted by Professional Wrestling Just Tap Out on November 18, 2021, Kitamura unsuccessfully challenged Arata for the Independent World Junior Heavyweight Championship.

He has also competed in several joshi promotions as male talent. At Ice Ribbon New Ice Ribbon #957, an event produced by Ice Ribbon on May 1, 2019, he teamed with Himeka Arita and Ibuki Hoshi in a loss to Amazon, Giulia and Naoki Kamata in a mixed tag team match. At Diana Jaguar's Memorial 61st Birthday & 46th Anniversary, an event promoted by World Woman Pro-Wrestling Diana on July 25, 2022, Kitamura teamed with Tsugutaka Sato, Astroman and Ryo Hoshino in a loss to Junya Matsunaga, Satsuki Nagao, Takafumi and Takumi Baba in an eight-man tag team match. At the Marvelous 7th Anniversary event on May 3, 2023, he teamed with JT Thorne and Leo Isaka to defeat Astro, Ryo Hoshino and Shiho.

=== Pro Wrestling Zero1 (2018–present) ===
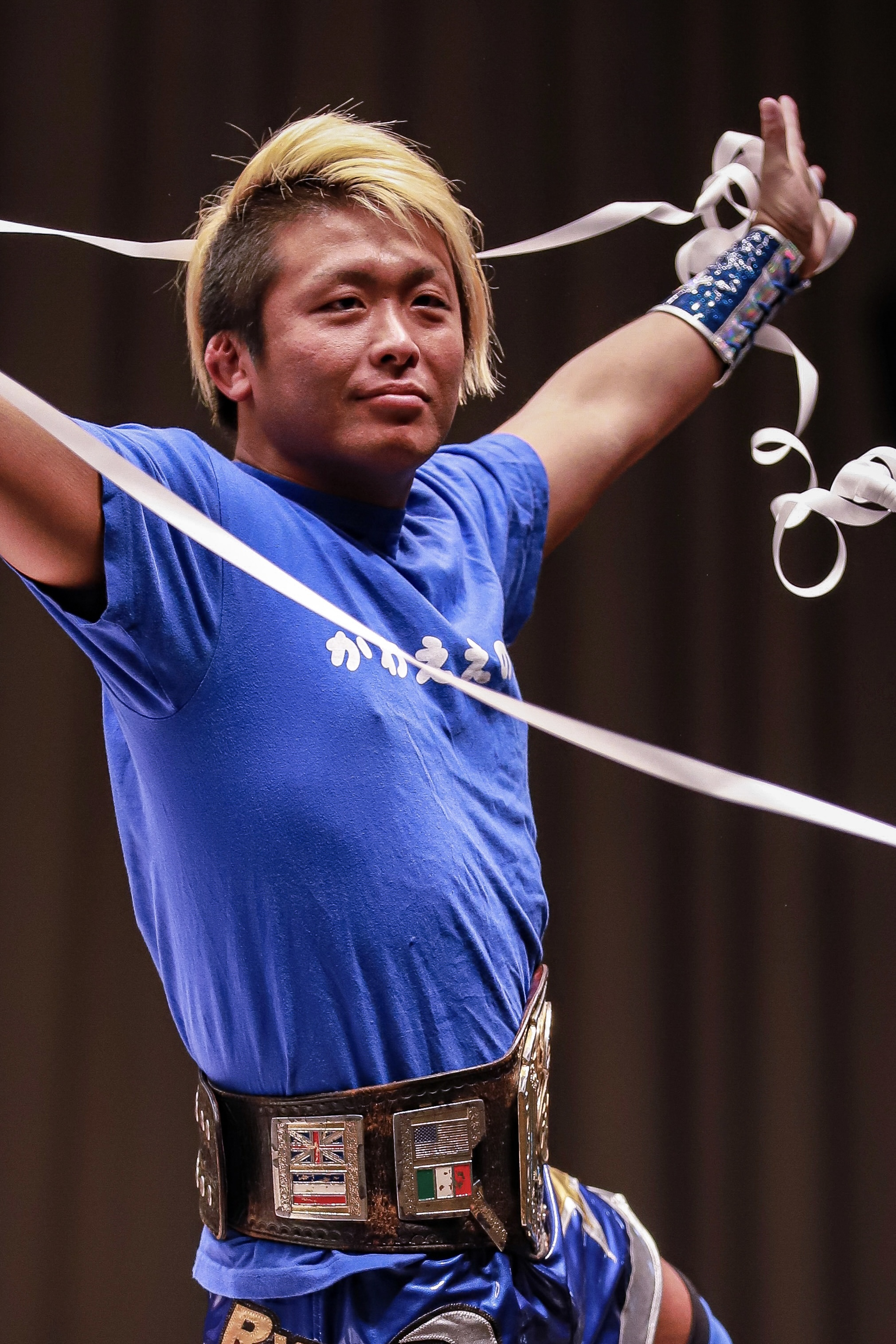
Kitamura is a former World Junior Heavyweight Champion

Kitamura is best known for his work in Pro Wrestling Zero1. He made his debut for the promotion on the second night of the ZERO1 Dream Series on February 12, 2018, where he lost to Towa Iwasaki. During his tenure, he challenged for several championships promoted by the company. At ZERO1 22nd Anniversary on March 5, 2023, he unsuccessfully challenged Masato Tanaka for the Zero1 World Heavyweight Championship.

Through Zero1's partnerships with other promotions, Kitamura also appeared in crossover events, including the BJW/ZERO1/2AW Big Clash on December 24, 2022, where he teamed with Tatsuya Hanami and Yuya Aoki in a loss to Ayato Yoshida, Daisuke Sekimoto and Masato Tanaka.

Kitamura has competed in several of the promotion's signature tournaments, most notably the Tenka-Ichi Junior Tournament. He debuted in the tournament in 2019, an edition won by Hub and featuring competitors such as Fuminori Abe, Hide Kubota, Ikuto Hidaka, Mao, Raicho, Sean Guinness, Tatsuhito Takaiwa and Sugi. He achieved his best results in 2020 and 2022, winning the tournament on both occasions. In 2020, he defeated Drew Parker in the first round, Hide Kubota in the second round, Raicho in the semifinals, and El Lindaman in the finals. In 2022, Kitamura topped Block B with fifteen points after competing against Astroman, Leo Isaka, Yoshikazu Yokoyama and Jun Masaoka, before defeating Tatsuhito Takaiwa in the finals.

Another signature tournament in which he has competed is the Furinkazan. He first appeared in the 2018 edition, teaming with Yoshiaki Fujiwara and losing to Shinjiro Otani and Tatsuhito Takaiwa in the first round. In the 2021 edition, he teamed with Takafumi, defeating Tsugutaka Sato and Koji Doi in the first round before losing to Tomohiko Hashimoto and Gajo in the semifinals. At the 2022 edition, he teamed with Leo Isaka and was eliminated in the first round by the Kubota Brothers (Hide Kubota and Yasu Kubota).

=== Pro Wrestling Noah (2018, 2022–present) ===
Kitamura began working for Pro Wrestling Noah as a developmental talent shared with Zero1. He made his first appearance for the promotion on the second night of NOAH Winter Navigation 2018 on December 7, teaming with Sugi and Tatsuhito Takaiwa in a loss to Ratel's (Hayata, Tadasuke and Yo-Hey). After a four-year absence, he returned at New Hope 2022 on December 18, where he wrestled Atsushi Kotoge to a time-limit draw. He subsequently appeared at several of the promotion's major events, including N Innovation 2022 on December 23, where he defeated Hi69 in singles competition.

== Championships and accomplishments ==
- Big Japan Pro Wrestling
  - BJW Junior Heavyweight Championship (1 time, current)
- Pro Wrestling Zero1
  - NWA World Junior Heavyweight Championship (1 time)
  - International Junior Heavyweight Championship (1 time)
  - Tenkaichi Junior (2020, 2022)
  - Chono Camp (2022)
