= Tsuyoshi Kikuchi =

Japanese professional wrestler

Personal information
- Born: November 21, 1964 (age 61) Sendai, Miyagi, Japan

Professional wrestling career
- Ring name(s): Dokuganryu-Sasakaman; Tsuyoshi Kikuchi; Takashi Kikuchi
- Billed height: 1.78 m (5 ft 10 in)
- Billed weight: 99 kg (218 lb)
- Trained by: AJPW Dojo; Jumbo Tsuruta; Masanobu Fuchi
- Debut: February 26, 1988, vs. Mitsuo Momota
- Retired: May 3, 2021

Tsuyoshi Kikuchi (菊地 毅, Kikuchi Tsuyoshi) (born November 21, 1964) is a Japanese retired professional wrestler. He is best known for All Japan Pro Wrestling and Pro Wrestling NOAH. Kikuchi idolized and patterned his style after the Dynamite Kid.

== Professional wrestling career ==
=== All Japan Pro Wrestling (1988–2000) ===
Kikuchi turned pro on February 26, 1988, his debut was against veteran wrestler Mitsuo Momota. Like many, Kikuchi spent his early years wrestling in opening and low midcard matches, paying his dues. By late 1990, Kikuchi began moving up the card and before long was becoming a Jr. Title contender. His first title shot was on July 12, 1990, when he challenged Masanobu Fuchi for the World Junior Heavyweight Championship but he came up short. He challenged for the title four more times between January 26, 1991, to February 28, 1993, coming up short each time. By 1991, Kikuchi also began teaming with future legend: Kenta Kobashi. The two first received a shot at the vacated All Asia Tag Team Championship on April 6, 1991, against The British Bruisers but lost. A few months later on June 1, 1991, they received another shot against then-champions Doug Furnas and Dan Kroffat but failed to win the titles. Kikuchi and Kobashi also entered the 1991 World's Strongest Tag Determination League but finished 11th place with 4 points.

On May 25, 1992, Kikuchi and Kobashi again challenge Furnas and Kroffat for the All Asia Tag Team Titles and this time was victorious as Kikuchi won his first title. Along with the title win, the match won numerous honors as the Wrestling Observer Newsletter gave it 5 Stars and named it the 1992 Match of the Year. During the title reign, Kikuchi also enjoyed success in the Junior Division by winning the yearly January 3 Junior Heavyweight Korakuen Hall Battle Royal on January 3, 1993 and also won a Junior Heavyweight Tournament on January 31, 1993. After a year as champions, Kikuchi and Kobashi lost the titles on June 2, 1993, to The Patriot and The Eagle. Following the title loss, Kikuchi and Kobashi broke up with Kobashi forming a successful team with Mitsuharu Misawa while Kikuchi remained in the midcard.

From 1993 to 1996, Kikuchi largely remained in the midcard with little to no direction, and continued to receive shots at the Jr. title and All Asia Tag titles but continually failed to win either. On July 24, 1996, Kikuchi defeated Fuchi to finally win the World Junior Heavyweight Championship. He went on to make two successful title defenses and hold the title throughout the remainder of 1996 before eventually losing the title to Yoshinari Ogawa on January 15, 1997.

After losing the title, Kikuchi's spent the remainder of his All Japan tenure wrestling in opening and low card matches as he wrestled young up and comers or aging legends. Also with the exception of a failed Jr. Heavyweight title shot on January 22, 2000, he, for the most part, was out of the title loop. In June 2000, Kikuchi left All Japan with the majority of the native roster and joined Misawa's new promotion:Pro Wrestling NOAH.

=== Pro Wrestling Noah (2000–2010) ===
Kikuchi debuted for Noah at their first show on August 5, 2000. For the most part, his time in NOAH was like the end of his All Japan tenure as he spent it in opening matches and in the low midcard. Despite this, Kikuchi did occasionally receive title shots as he entered a tournament to crown the first GHC Junior Heavyweight Champion in 2001 making all the way to the semi-finals before losing to eventual winner: Yoshinobu Kanemaru. In 2002, Kikuchi began teaming with Kanemaru as the two invaded New Japan Pro-Wrestling and defeated Jyushin Thunder Liger and Minoru Tanaka to win the IWGP Junior Tag Team Championship. The two held onto the title for four months and made four successful title defenses before eventually losing the title to Liger and Koji Kanemoto on January 26, 2003.

After losing the titles, Kikuchi once again returned to opening matches, over the next few years, he occasionally got title shots at the GHC Jr. Title, the GHC Junior Heavyweight Tag Team Championship and GHC Openweight Hardcore Championship but came up short each time. In 2010, Kikuchi along with a few others were released from Noah.

=== Freelance (2010–2021) ===
After leaving Noah, Kikuchi became a freelancer doing shows for All Japan and Dragon Gate. On September 20, 2010, Kikuchi challenged Kaz Hayashi for the World Junior Heavyweight Championship but lost. In November, Kikuchi returned to All Japan to participate in the 2010 World's Strongest Tag Determination League teaming up with Tamon Honda. On January 3, 2011, Kikuchi and Honda challenged Seiya Sanada and Manabu Soya for the All Asia Tag Team Championship but lost. In January 2011, Kikuchi also debuted in DDT. In the spring, Kikuchi returned to New Japan for their NEVER brand by taking part in the Road to the Super Juniors tournament where the two winners qualified for the 2011 Best of the Super Juniors. On April 7, Kikuchi defeated Ken Ohka in the first round. Then on April 8, he defeated Kazuhiro Tamura in the semifinals, but lost in the finals later that night to Daisuke Sasaki. In April, Kikuchi returned to All Japan to take part in the 2011 Jr. Tag League teaming with Masanobu Fuchi.

He defeated Craig Classic for the NWA World Junior Heavyweight Championship on January 1, 2012, at the Korakuen Hall in a Zero1 show. On February 1, 2012, he became a double champion, teaming with Takuya Sugawara, and defeating Ikuto Hidaka and Takafumi Ito to win the NWA International Lightweight Tag Team Championship. However, Kikuchi lost the title to his tag-team partner Sugawara on March 2 at 11th Anniversary show. Shortly thereafter, Kikuchi and Sugawara were stripped of the NWA International Lightweight Tag Team titles.

On August 11, 2017, Kikuchi took part in a mini-tournament for the new WEW Junior Heavyweight Championship for Pro Wrestling A-Team. He defeated Takumi Sakurai to qualify for the four-way elimination-style tournament final, in which he defeated Nobutaka Moribe, Masamune, and HASEGAWA, to win the tournament and title, to become the inaugural champion.

Kikuchi had his retirement on May 3, 2021, losing to Koji Kanemoto.

== Championships and accomplishments ==
- All Japan Pro Wrestling

- All Asia Tag Team Championship (1 time) – with Kenta Kobashi
- World Junior Heavyweight Championship (1 time)
- Junior Heavyweight Tournament (1993)
- January 3 Korakuen Hall Junior Heavyweight Battle Royal (1993)
- World's Strongest Tag Determination League Fresh Award (1991) – with Kenta Kobashi

- Apache Army

- Apache Opendivision Championship (1 time)

- Dramatic Dream Team

- Ironman Heavymetalweight Championship (2 times)

- New Japan Pro-Wrestling

- IWGP Junior Heavyweight Tag Team Championship (1 time) – with Yoshinobu Kanemaru

- Pro Wrestling A-Team

- WEW Junior Heavyweight Championship (1 time)

- Pro Wrestling Zero1

- NWA World Junior Heavyweight Championship (Zero1 version) (1 time)
- NWA International Lightweight Tag Team Championship (1 time) – with Takuya Sugawara

- Wrestling Observer Newsletter awards

- Match of the Year (1992) with Kenta Kobashi vs. Doug Furnas and Dan Kroffat, Sendai, May 25

== Personal ==
Kikuchi owns "Kotetsu", a restaurant in Tomiya, Miyagi. It is frequented by wrestlers when in the area and the walls are adorned with wrestler photographs and autographs, pictures from Kikuchi's career, and posters for his upcoming appearances.
