= Leo Isaka =

Japanese professional wrestler

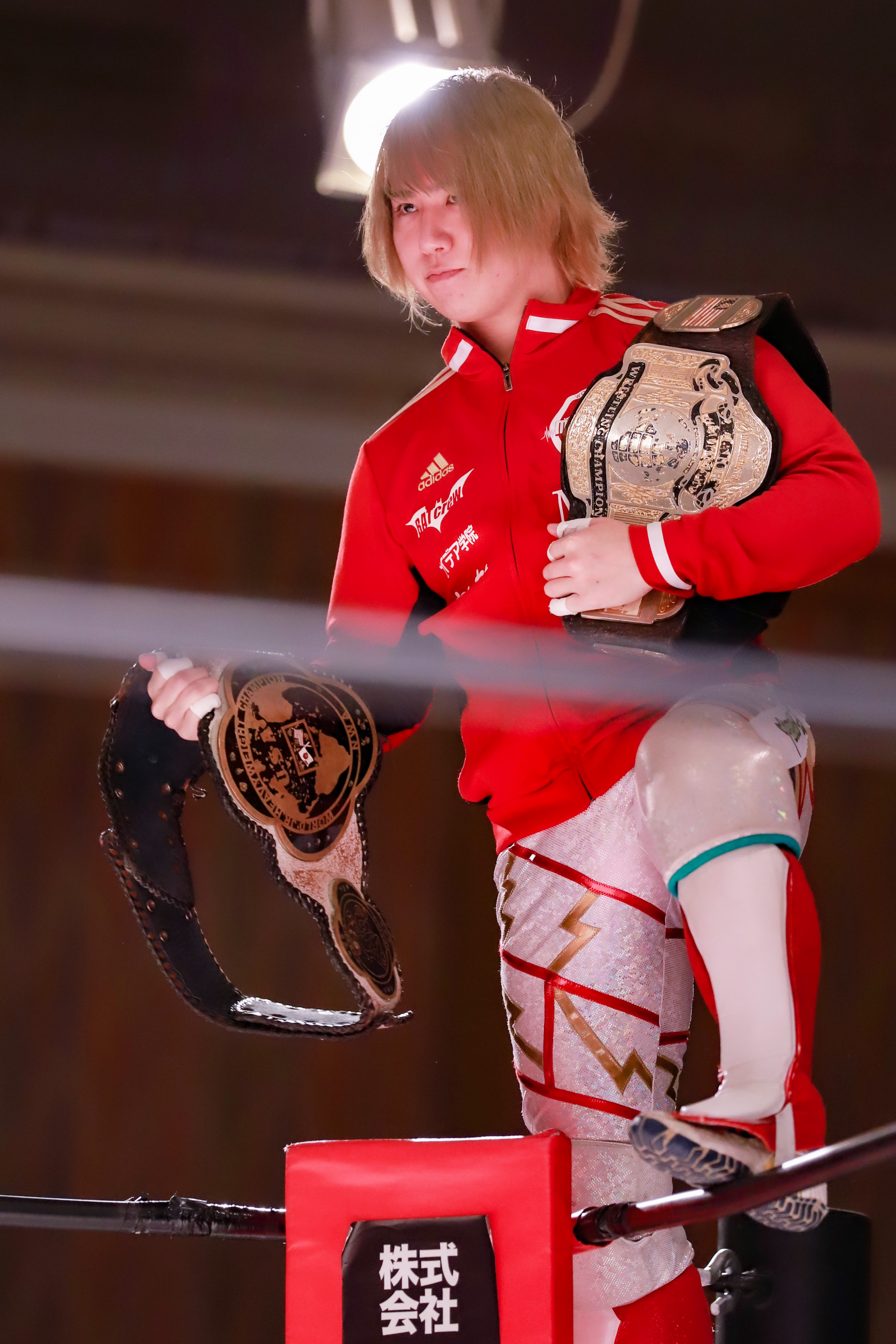
- Isaka in February 2023

Personal information
- Born: September 21, 1998 (age 27) Tochigi, Japan

Professional wrestling career
- Ring name(s): Sachihiro Isaka; Leo Isaka
- Billed height: 166 cm (5 ft 5 in)
- Trained by: Chigusa Nagayo
- Debut: 2017

Leo Isaka (井坂レオ, Isaka Reo) is a Japanese professional wrestler currently signed to the Japanese promotion Marvelous That's Women Pro Wrestling. He is also known for his tenure with Pro Wrestling Zero1 where he is a former one-time World Junior Heavyweight Champion and International Junior Heavyweight Champion with both titles.

== Professional wrestling career ==
=== Marvelous That's Women Pro Wrestling (2017–present) ===
Despite being a male competitor, Isaka made his professional wrestling in a joshi promotion, Marvelous That's Women Pro Wrestling. He wrestled his first ever match at Marvelous 1st Anniversary on April 15, 2017, where he fell short to Dick Togo in a singles competition.

Due to Marvelous holding business partnerships with various promotions from the Japanese independent scene, Isaka competed in many cross-over events or other strictly promoted ones by both male and joshi promotions. At Diana/CRYSIS ASUKA Produce, an event produced by World Woman Pro-Wrestling Diana on March 28, 2021, he teamed up with Cherry and Kyoko Inoue to defeat Guts Ishijima, Kazuki and Megumi Yabushita in a intergender six-person tag team match. At DDT DAMNATION Produce Illegal Assembly Returns Vol. 4, an event produced by DDT Pro-Wrestling on July 26, 2021, he fell short to Tetsuya Endo in singles competition. At Marvelous/WAVE Fusion ~ Tommy 40th Anniversary from October 1, 2021, he fell short to Shunma Katsumata. At BASARA 170 ~ Hojiro, an event promoted by Pro-Wrestling Basara on September 20, 2021, he teamed up with Sento Minzoku (Daiki Shimomura and Isami Kodaka) to defeat Fuminori Abe, Takumi Tsukamoto and Yasu Urano in a six-man tag team match.

=== Pro Wrestling Zero1 (2017–present) ===
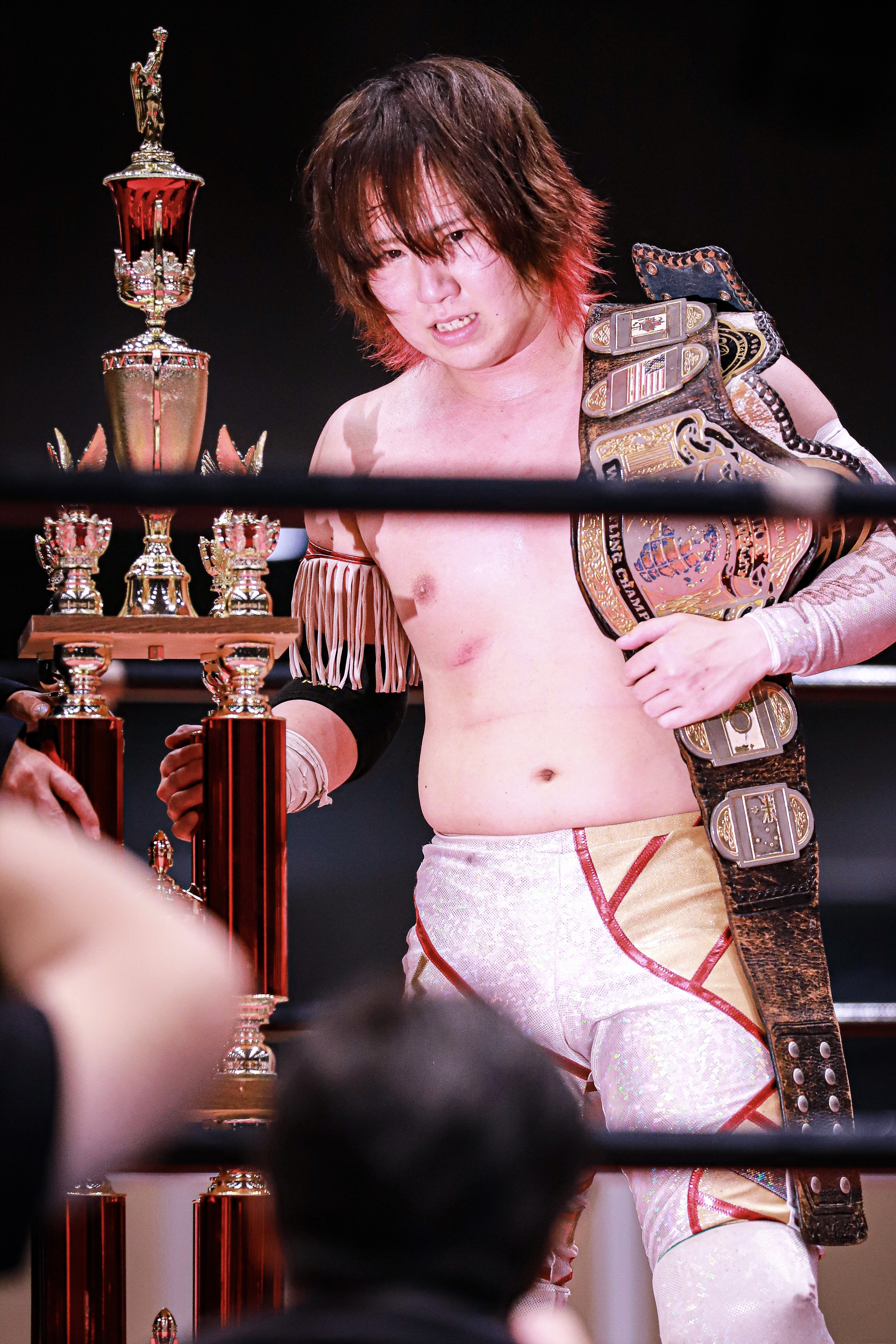
Isaka in May 2023

Isaka made his debut in Pro Wrestling Zero1 at ZERO1/Super Fireworks Fireworks Dream Series ~ The Birth of Team on May 7, 2017, where he fell short to Ikuto Hidaka. At ZERO1 Tochigi Pro-Wrestling Halloween Smile Festival on November 30, 2022, he teamed up with Shoki Kitamura to unsuccessfully challenge Junya Matsunaga and Takafumi for the Intercontinental Tag Team Championship (Zero1). During his time in the company, he chased for various championships promoted by it. At Zero1 Happy New Year 2023 on January 1, he defeated Astroman to win both the World Junior Heavyweight Championship and the International Junior Heavyweight Championship which were sanctioned together.

He is known for competing in one of the promotion's signature events, the Furinkazan tournament. He made his first appearance at the 2022 edition where he teamed up with Shoki Kitamura and fell short to Kubota Brothers (Hide Kubota and Yasu Kubota) in the first rounds from November 11. Another event in which he previously competed is the Tenkaichi Junior Tournament in which he made his first appearance at the 2021 edition where he defeated Genta Hiriki in the first rounds but fell short to Hide Kubota in the second ones. At the 2022 edition of the tournament, Isaka competed in the block A where he scored a total of ten points after going against Shoki Kitamura, Yoshikazu Yokoyama, Astroman and Jun Masaoka.

== Championships and accomplishments ==
- Pro Wrestling Zero1
  - NWA World Junior Heavyweight Championship (1 time)
  - International Junior Heavyweight Championship (1 time)
