= NWA World Junior Heavyweight Championship (Zero1) =

Professional wrestling championship

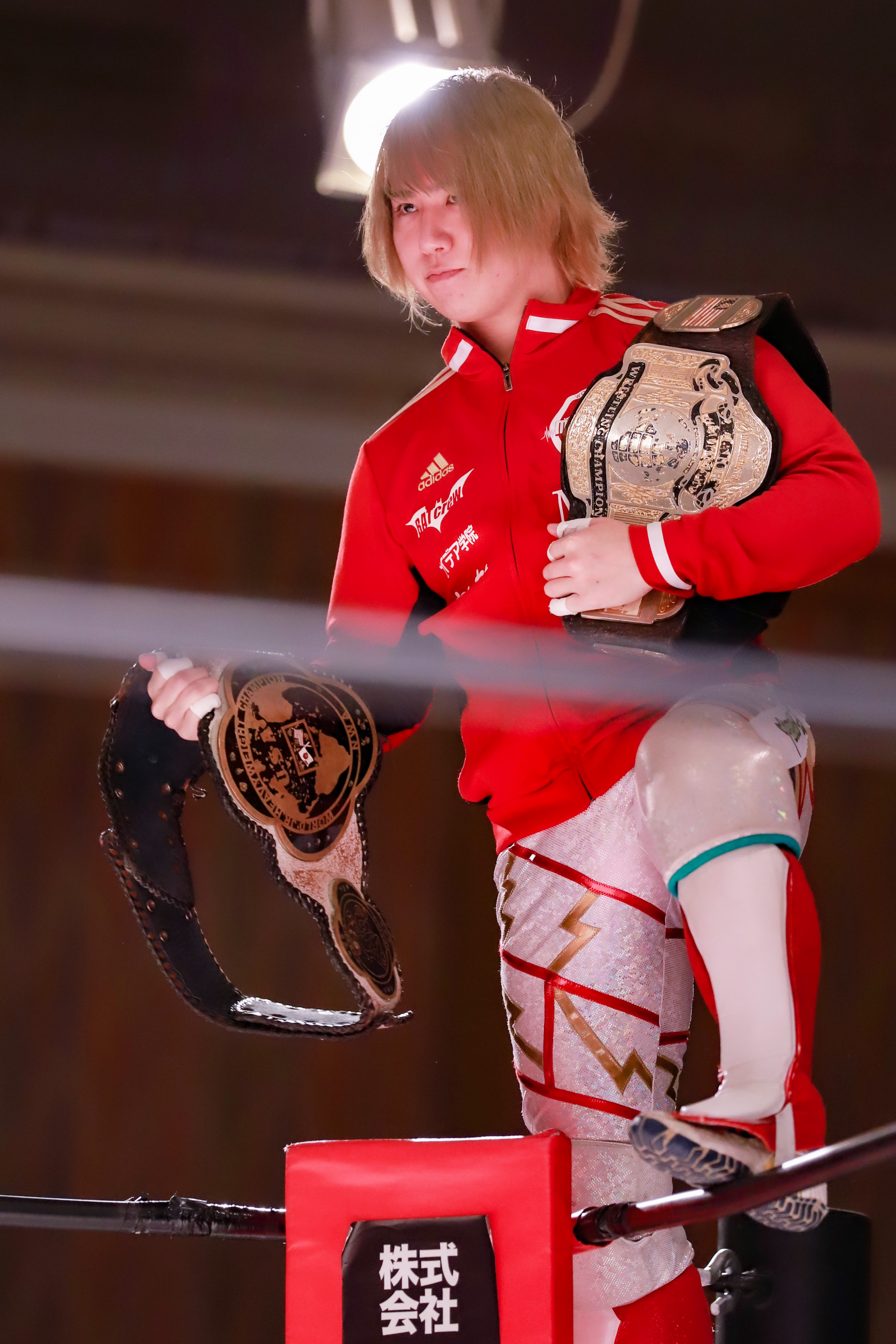
- Leo Isaka holding the NWA World Junior title in his right hand

Details
- Promotion: Pro Wrestling Zero1; New Wrestling Alliance
- Date established: September 20, 2011
- Current champion: Takumi Baba
- Date won: January 1, 2025

Other name
- NWA Junior Heavyweight Championship
Statistics
- First champion: Craig Classic
- Most reigns: Jason Lee and Takuya Sugawara (2 reigns)
- Longest reign: Takumi Baba (493+ days)
- Shortest reign: Mineo Fujita (45 days)
- Oldest champion: Tsuyoshi Kikuchi (47 years, 41 days)
- Youngest champion: Jason Lee (21 years, 142 days)
- Heaviest champion: Shinjiro Otani (107 kg (236 lb))
- Lightest champion: Jonathan Gresham (73 kg (161 lb))

The NWA World Junior Heavyweight Championship is a professional wrestling championship owned by the Japanese Pro Wrestling Zero1 (Zero1) promotion. The title is meant for wrestlers under the weight limit of 100 kg (220 lb), referred to as "junior heavyweights" in Japan.

On July 11, 2011, then-NWA World Junior Heavyweight Champion Craig Classic announced that he was relinquishing his title in protest over the National Wrestling Alliance (NWA) stripping The Sheik of the NWA World Heavyweight Championship. However, on September 20, NWA affiliate Pro Wrestling Zero1 announced that they still recognized Classic as the NWA World Junior Heavyweight Champion. When Classic returned to the promotion on October 2, he was still in possession of the NWA title belt (which was the belt worn by the original Tiger Mask, Satoru Sayama, in the 1980s), which he went on to successfully defend against Munenori Sawa. Despite this being the first appearance of the new version of the title, Zero1 went as far as adopting the original title's history, referring to Classic as the 108th champion and his defense against Sawa as his 22nd successful defense. Meanwhile, NWA crowned their own NWA World Junior Heavyweight Champion, Kevin Douglas, on October 7, meaning that there now were two champions supposedly holding the same title. That same month, Zero1 quit the NWA and renamed all of their National Wrestling Alliance championships "New Wrestling Alliance" championships.

Like most professional wrestling championships, the title is won as a result of a scripted match. There have been a total of twenty-four reigns shared among twenty different wrestlers. The current champion is Takumi Baba who is in his second reign.

== Title history ==
Key
No.	Overall reign number
Reign	Reign number for the specific champion
Days	Number of days held
Defenses	Number of successful defenses
<1	Reign lasted less than a day
+	Current reign is changing daily

No.	Champion	Championship change			Reign statistics			Notes	Ref.
No.	Champion	Date	Event	Location	Reign	Days	Defenses	Notes	Ref.
National Wrestling Alliance
1^{(108)}	Craig Classic	June 11, 2010	November Coming Fire	Fort Pierce, FL	1	421 (Note: Classic's reign is calculated from the day he won the NWA-recognized World Junior Heavyweight Championship until the day he lost the title as recognized by Zero1. As such, it excludes him vacating the title and predates the split in the championship lineage.)	3 (Note: Classic made three defenses of Zero1's NWA World Junior Heavyweight Championship, however, Classic made 23 total defenses of the NWA-recognized World Junior Heavyweight Championship and Zero1's NWA World Junior Heavyweight Championship.)	Classic defeated Mike Quackenbush to win the championship; this match was promoted by NWA Florida. Zero1 continued to recognize Classic as the reigning NWA World Junior Heavyweight Champion, despite him having vacated the title on July 11, 2011.	
Pro Wrestling Zero1
2^{(109)}	Tsuyoshi Kikuchi	January 1, 2012	Puroresu Nippon	Tokyo, Japan	1	61	0		
3^{(110)}	Takuya Sugawara	March 2, 2012	Zero1 Eleven	Tokyo, Japan	1	428	5	This match was also contested for Sugawara's International Junior Heavyweight Championship.	
4^{(111)}	Jonathan Gresham	May 4, 2013	Big Bang	Tokyo, Japan	1	132	1	This match was also contested for the International Junior Heavyweight Championship. During his reign, Gresham additionally held the Zero1 USA World Junior Heavyweight Championship.	
—	Vacated	September 13, 2013	—	Tokyo, Japan	—	—	—	Gresham voluntarily vacated both the NWA and International Junior Heavyweight Championships ahead of the 2013 Tenkaichi Jr. finals.	
5^{(112)}	Hub	September 16, 2013	11th Tenkaichi Jr.: Finals	Tokyo, Japan	1	174	3	Hub defeated Mineo Fujita in the finals of the 2013 Tenkaichi Jr. tournament to win the vacant championship; this match was also contested for the International Junior Heavyweight Championship.	
6^{(113)}	Jason Lee	March 9, 2014	Zero1 Thirteen	Tokyo, Japan	1	194	2	This match was also contested for the International Junior Heavyweight Championship.	
7^{(114)}	Mineo Fujita	September 19, 2014	Tenkaichi Special	Tokyo, Japan	1	45	1	This match was also contested for the International Junior Heavyweight Championship.	
8^{(115)}	Takuya Sugawara	November 3, 2014	Hi no Kokudai Hanabi	Kumamoto, Japan	2	55	1	This match was also contested for the International Junior Heavyweight Championship.	
9^{(116)}	Jason Lee	December 28, 2014	Winter Fever 4	Hong Kong	2	63	1	This match was promoted by Zero1 Hong Kong and was also contested for the International Junior Heavyweight Championship.	
10^{(117)}	Minoru Tanaka	March 1, 2015	Zero1_Fourteen	Tokyo, Japan	1	224	3	This match was also contested for the International Junior Heavyweight Championship.	
11^{(118)}	Shinjiro Otani	October 11, 2015	Change the World	Tokyo, Japan	1	481	3	This match was also contested for the International Junior Heavyweight Championship.	
12^{(119)}	Kotaro Suzuki	February 3, 2017	Shinsei Zero1 Dream Series: Hakai no Jin	Tokyo, Japan	1	265	3	This match was also contested for the International Junior Heavyweight Championship.	
13^{(120)}	Sean Guinness	October 26, 2017	Dream Series Aki no Jin Korakuen Taikai	Tokyo, Japan	1	129	1	This match was also contested for the International Junior Heavyweight Championship.	
14^{(121)}	Isami Kodaka	March 4, 2018	Dream Series Sozo no Jin	Tokyo, Japan	1	(Note: The exact date on which Kodaka were stripped of the championship is not known, which means that his reign lasted between 242 and 265 days)	2	This match was also contested for the International Junior Heavyweight Championship.	
—	Vacated	November 2018	—	—	—	—	—	Kodaka was stripped of both the NWA and International Junior Heavyweight Championships due to an injury.	
15^{(122)}	Sugi	November 24, 2018	Dream Series ~ Nenotsuki No Jin ~ Tenka-Ichi Junior Tournament 2018	Tokyo, Japan	1	403	3	Sugi defeated Hayata in the finals of the 2018 Tenkaichi Jr. tournament to win the vacant championship; this match was also contested for the International Junior Heavyweight Championship.	
16^{(123)}	Hub	January 1, 2020	Happy New Year	Tokyo, Japan	2	247	0	This match was also contested for the International Junior Heavyweight Championship.	
17^{(124)}	Shoki Kitamura	September 4, 2020	Youth Playback! It All Started Here! Shinjiro Otani Returns To Asakura	Tokyo, Japan	1	58	0	This match was also contested for the International Junior Heavyweight Championship.	
18^{(125)}	El Lindaman	November 1, 2020	Fire Festival 2020	Tokyo, Japan	1	310	1	This match was also contested for the International Junior Heavyweight Championship.	
—	Vacated	September 7, 2021	—	—	—	—	—	El Lindaman was stripped of both the NWA and International Junior Heavyweight Championships after Gleat, Lindaman's home promotion, ended its working relationship with Zero1.	
19^{(126)}	Fuminori Abe	September 9, 2021	Zero1 20th Anniversary Year - 18th Tenkaichi Junior Tournament 2021 Final	Tokyo, Japan	1	213	5	Abe defeated Shoki Kitamura in the finals of the 2021 Tenkaichi Jr. tournament to win the vacant championship; this match was also contested for the International Junior Heavyweight Championship.	
20^{(127)}	Astroman	April 10, 2022	Zero1 Osu Premium Show Zero1 20th & 21st Anniversary Pro Wrestling	Tokyo, Japan	1	266	2	This match was also contested for the International Junior Heavyweight Championship.	
21^{(128)}	Leo Isaka	January 1, 2023	Zero1 Happy New Year 2023	Tokyo, Japan	1	195	4	This match was also contested for the International Junior Heavyweight Championship.	
22^{(129)}	Takumi Baba	July 15, 2023	Zero1 23rd Midsummer Festival	Tokyo, Japan	1	232	2	This match was also contested for the International Junior Heavyweight Championship.	
23^{(130)}	Seiki Yoshioka	March 3, 2024	Zero1 23rd Anniversary	Tokyo, Japan	1	304	1	This match was also contested for the International Junior Heavyweight Championship.	
24^{(131)}	Takumi Baba	January 1, 2025	Tochi Pro Happy New Year & Shinjiro Otani Aid ~ Stand Up Again And Again	Tokyo, Japan	2	493+	1	This match was also contested for the International Junior Heavyweight Championship.	

== Combined reigns ==
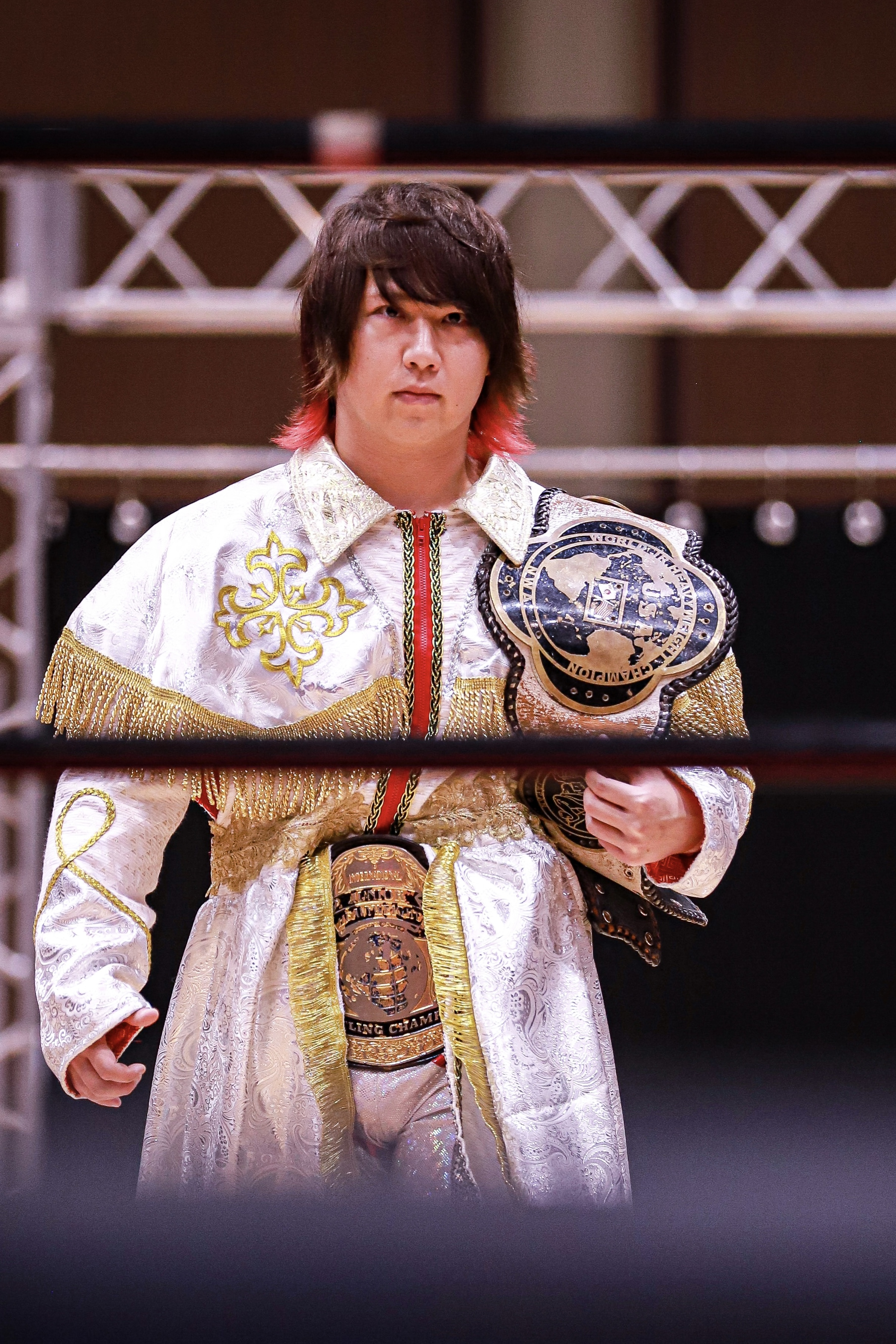
Former champion Leo Isaka, shown here also wearing the Zero1 International Junior Heavyweight Championship

As of May 9, 2026

†	Indicates the current champion
¤	The exact length of at least one title reign is uncertain, so the shortest length is considered.

Rank	Wrestler	No. of reigns	Combined defenses	Combined days
1	Takumi Baba †	2	3	725+
2	Takuya Sugawara	2	6	483
3	Shinjiro Otani	1	3	481
4	Hub	2	3	421
5	Craig Classic	1	17	421
6	Sugi	1	3	403
7	El Lindaman	1	1	310
8	Seiki Yoshioka	1	1	304
9	Astroman	1	2	266
10	Kotaro Suzuki	1	3	265
11	Jason Lee	2	3	257
12	Isami Kodaka	1	2	¤242
13	Minoru Tanaka	1	3	224
14	Fuminori Abe	1	5	213
15	Leo Isaka	1	4	195
16	Jonathan Gresham	1	1	132
17	Sean Guinness	1	1	129
18	Tsuyoshi Kikuchi	1	0	61
19	Shoki Kitamura	1	0	58
20	Mineo Fujita	1	1	45

== See also ==
- List of National Wrestling Alliance championships
- International Junior Heavyweight Championship (Zero1)
- NWA World Junior Heavyweight Championship
