= Mineo Fujita =

Japanese professional wrestler (born 1979)

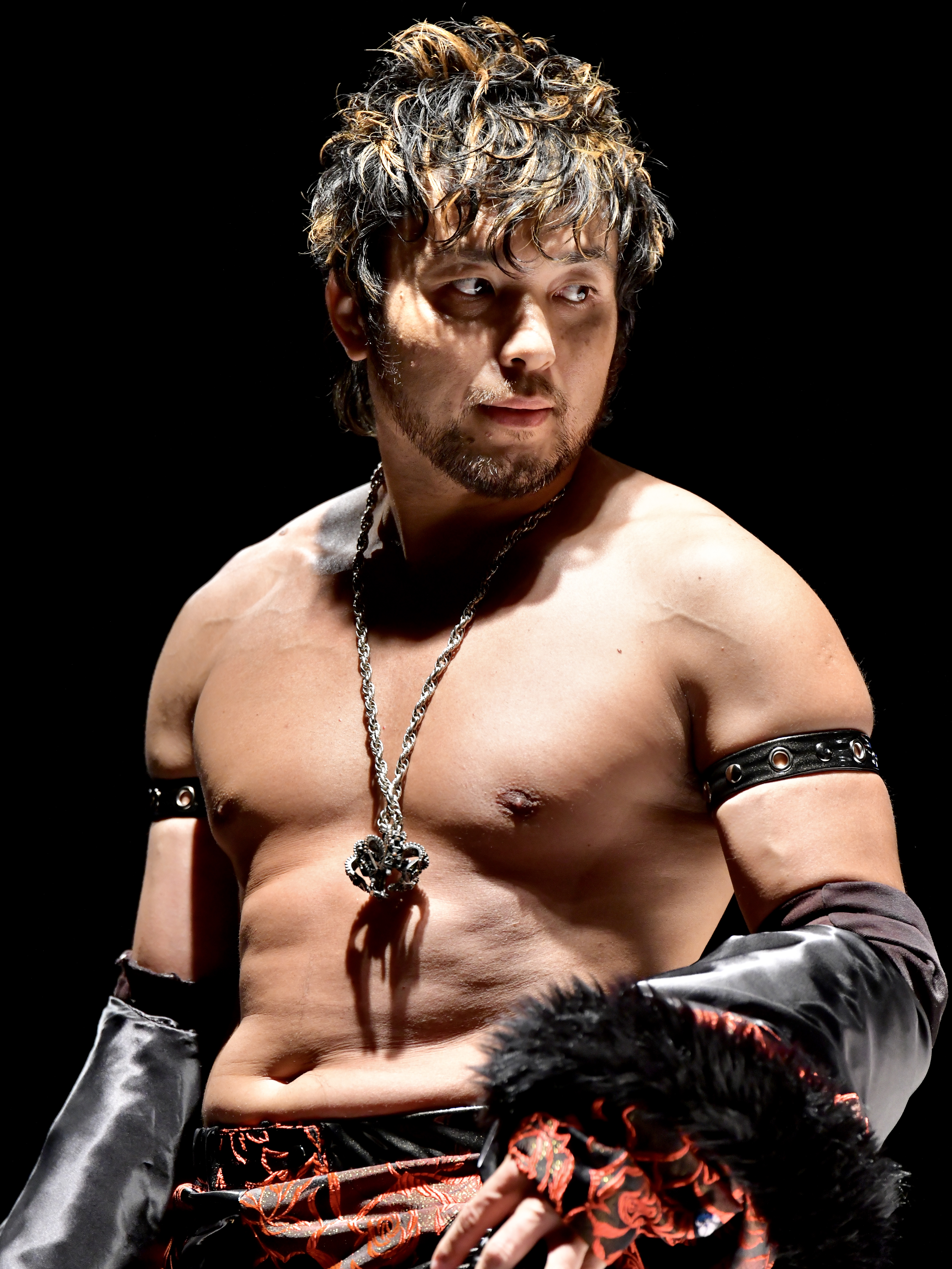
- Mineo Fujita in April 2019

Personal information
- Born: November 28, 1979 (age 46)

Professional wrestling career
- Ring name(s): Bikuma; Keiji Maeda; Keijiro Maeda; Mineo Fujita; MINEPYON
- Billed height: 1.78 m (5 ft 10 in)
- Billed weight: 80 kg (180 lb)
- Trained by: Animal Hamaguchi; Mr. Gannosuke
- Debut: 2002

Mineo Fujita (藤田峰雄, Fujita Mineo; born November 28, 1979) is a Japanese professional wrestler. He currently works for Pro Wrestling Zero1, where he is a former International Junior Heavyweight and NWA World Junior Heavyweight Champion and NWA International Lightweight Tag Team Champion with Takuya Sugawara.

== Professional wrestling career ==
=== Wrestling Marvellous Future (2002–2008) ===
Fujita made his professional wrestling debut on November 10, 2002, at Wrestling Marvellous Future and lost to Hisakatsu Oya. As is customary in most wrestling promotions, especially Japan, Fujita lost the majority of his matches to gain in-ring experience and to put over more experienced wrestlers. His first win came on March 23, 2003, when he defeated fellow Naoya Takase. On November 20, Fujita took on Tomoya Adachi for the WMF Junior Heavyweight Championship and lost. In November 2004, Fujita entered WMF Round Robin Tournament where he gained only four points, defeating Garuda for two points and reaching two time limit draws against Onryo and Seiji Ikeda for one point from each, therefore not progressing further. Fujita had another shot at the WMF Junior Heavyweight Championship, in 2005, when he took on GOEMON and lost. In 2005, he changed his name to MINEPYON for a short period. In the Marvelous Future Tag Team Tournament, Fujita teamed up with Kitten Kid and won the tournament by defeating Gosaku and Kamui in the final. Fujita would perform more sporadically for WMF after 2006 due to competing more regularly for other promotions and the fact that WMF was slowly dying.

=== Osaka Pro Wrestling (2006–2012) ===
On May 14, 2006, Fujita debuted for Osaka Pro Wrestling and teamed with Flash Moon and Tigers Mask to defeat Billyken Kid, Black Buffalo and Yuko Miyamoto. In August, Fujita had his first title shot at Osaka Pro when he participated in a battle royal for the Osaka Pro Wrestling Battle Royal Championship which was won by Mr. Carasco. Fujita participated in Tenno-Zan 2006 and lost to Asian Cougar in the first round of the tournament. Since the end of 2006, Fujita has competed for Osaka Pro sporadically, returning every year for a couple of matches, this included teaming with Amigo Suzuki Atsushi Kotoge and Daisuke Harada for the Osaka Pro Wrestling Tag Team Championship and lost.

=== Dradition Pro-Wrestling (2008–2010) ===
In 2008, Fujita joined Dradition Pro-Wrestling, known simply as Dradition which is a combination of "dragon" and "tradition". On February 23, 2008, Fujita teamed up with Mr. Gannosuke and lost to Takeshi Minamino and Último Dragón. In 2008 he mostly competed in tag team matches and for the first half of 2009 he mostly competed in battle royals. On October 1, 2009, Fujita defeated Hajime Ohara for the NWA International Junior Heavyweight Championship. He would hold the championship until July 19, 2010 when he lost it to Último Dragón.

=== Fukumen MANIA (2009–2011) ===
On July 6, 2009, Fujita debuted for Fukumen MANIA at Fukumen MANIA.12 and won a one night tournament called where the winner would become the Fukumen MANIA Super Lightweight Champion. In December, at Fukumen MANIA 13, he lost the championship in his first defence against Ken45º. At Fukumen MANIA 14, 15 and 16, he participated in tag team matches. At Fukumen MANIA 18, he lost an elimination Fukumen MANIA Super Lightweight Championship number-one contendership match. He appeared for the last two Fukumen MANIAs.

=== Pro Wrestling Zero1 (2009–present) ===
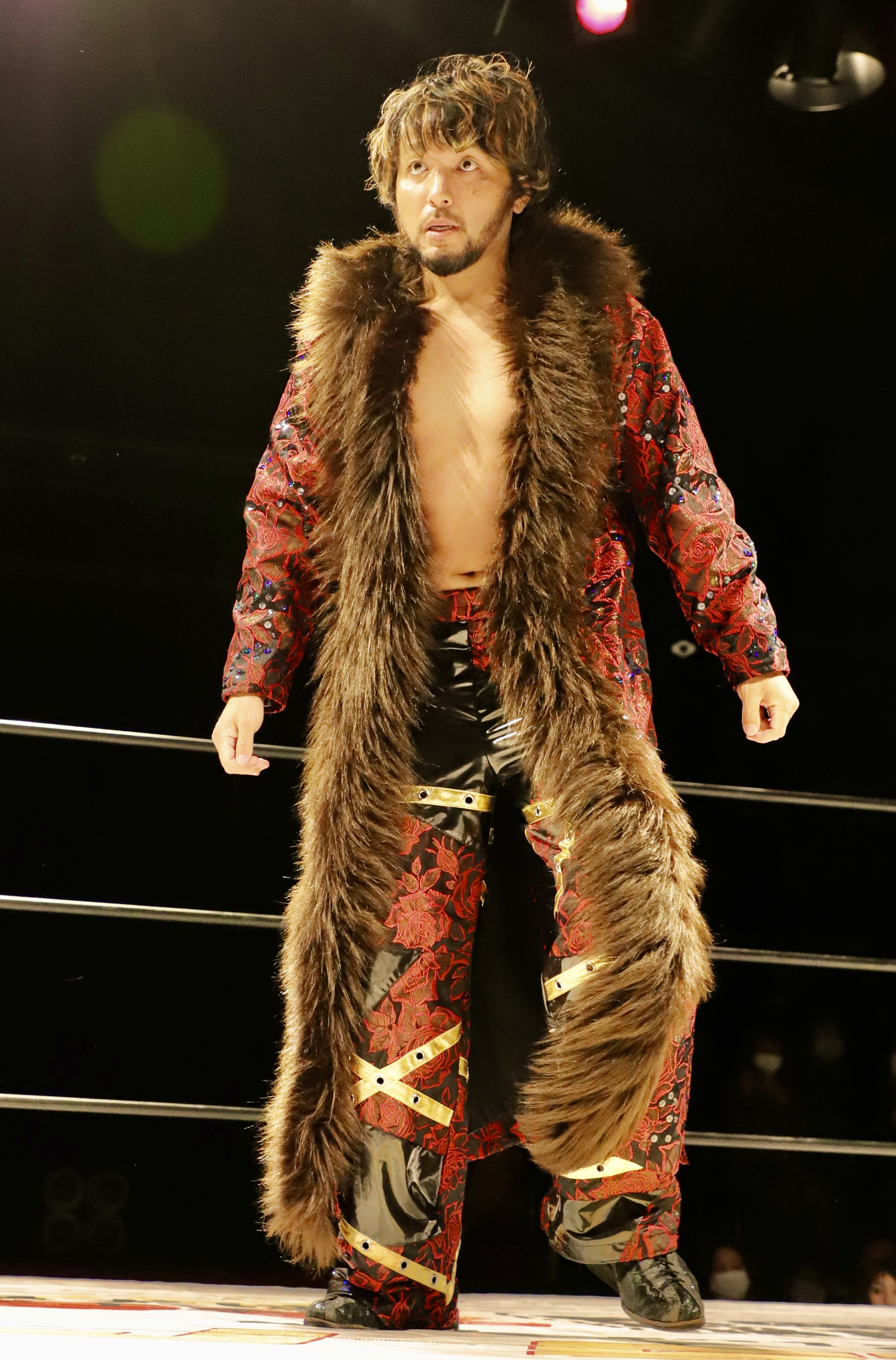
Fujita in November 2020

Fujita made his debut for Pro Wrestling Zero1 on January 23, 2009 and teamed with Yusaku Obata to defeat Shito Ueda and Yuzuru Saito. In late 2010 to early 2011, Fujita participated in numerous number-one contendership matches for various championships. On July 14, 2011, Fujita took on Takuya Sugawara for the ZERO1 International Junior Heavyweight Championship and lost. He also took part in Tenka-Ichi Junior Tournament 2011 and made it to the semi-final where he lost to Fujita Hayato. Fujita then teamed up with Shito Ueda to take part Furinkazan Tag League 2011 in block B. They won only won match in an upset victory over Akebono and Daichi Hashimoto. In January 2012, Fujita lost to Takuya Sugawara in a match for the ZERO1 International Junior Heavyweight Championship and also involving Ikuto Hidaka. Fujita also had several opportunities to become one half of the NWA International Lightweight Tag Team Champions and lost them all. On August 26, Fujita's hard work finally paid off when he won the NWA International Lightweight Tag Team Championship with Takuya Sugawara. However the celebration would be short lived because they lost the titles to Frank David and Shawn Maxer only 22 days later. On September 19, 2014, Fujita defeated Jason Lee to win the International Junior Heavyweight and NWA World Junior Heavyweight Championships. He lost the titles to Takuya Sugawara on November 3.

== Championships and accomplishment ==
- Big Japan Pro Wrestling
  - NWA International Junior Heavyweight Championship (1 time)
- Fukumen MANIA
  - Fukumen MANIA Super Lightweight Championship (1 time)
- Pro Wrestling Zero1
  - International Junior Heavyweight Championship (1 time)
  - NWA International Lightweight Tag Team Championship (1 time) - with Takuya Sugawara
  - NWA World Junior Heavyweight Championship (1 time)
