= Takuya Sugawara =

Japanese professional wrestler

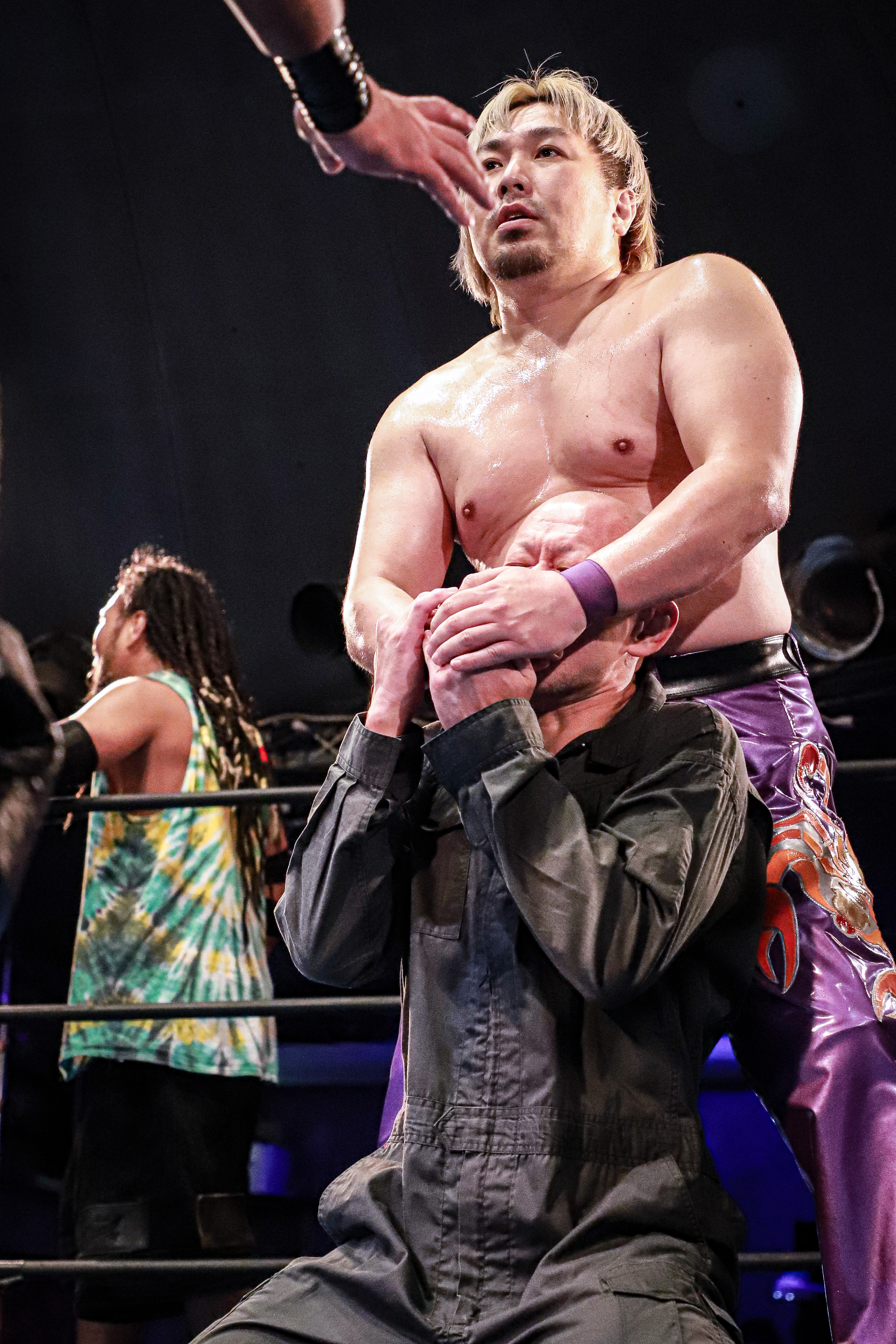
- Sugawara in July 2023

Personal information
- Born: November 3, 1983 (age 43) Ōdate, Akita, Japan

Professional wrestling career
- Ring name(s): Takuya Sugawara; Henry III Sugawara; Dr. Muscle; Sugawara
- Billed height: 1.78 m (5 ft 10 in)
- Billed weight: 95 kg (209 lb)
- Trained by: Último Dragón; Jorge 'Skayde' Rivera
- Debut: December 2, 2001

Takuya Sugawara (菅原 拓也, Sugawara Takuya; born November 3, 1983) is a Japanese professional wrestler, He currently performs on the Pro Wrestling Zero1 and Japanese independent circuit.

== Career ==
=== Toryumon/Dragon Gate (2001–2004) ===
He debuted in the 8th term of Toryumon 2000 Project as Henry III Sugawara, an English prince character. He joined with and eventually with Anthony W. Mori and Phillip J. Fukumasa, forming the Royal Brothers unit in T2P. The gimmick was that all three wrestlers were royal princes. However, the Royal Brothers would never make much of an impact. Fukamasa retired almost immediately after T2P closed, and Sugawara spent most of his time back in Mexico while Mori wrestled in Toryumon.

When he finally came to Toryumon himself, he was courted by heel stable Aagan Iisou, led by Shuji Kondo. Although he initially refused the request to join, he would eventually betray Mori and ally with Aagan. He and Mori would feud, with the finish coming in a hair vs hair match. Sugawara lost the match, but escaped losing his hair. While a member of Aagan Iisou, he regularly teamed with Kondo and brother Yasshi. This team would continue for some time, but all the members of Aagan Iisou were fired from Dragon Gate on December 31, 2004, for controversial and mostly unexplained reasons.

=== Dragondoor and El Dorado Wrestling (2005–2008) ===
Sugawara was hit the hardest by the firing of Aagan Iisou, and he did not resurface in the wrestling world until Dragondoor was announced. In this promotion, Aagan Iisou was put in a feud against Taiji Ishimori and his home army, but Dragondoor's short lived existence impeded any development. After the promotion closed, Sugawara moved to Pro Wrestling Zero1, where he formed a tag team with Gamma. Around this time, Sugawara's allegiance to Aagan Iisou was tenuous, and Gamma capitalized on it to persuade him to join his Stoned stable, which acted mainly in Michinoku Pro Wrestling. Although Sugawara kept himself in Zero1, he accepted Gamma's offer and started teaming up there with another Stoned wrestler, Kagetora, who eventually took Gamma's place as the leader of the group.

When Dragondoor was reopened under the form of El Dorado Wrestling, Sugawara returned as well. However, he was now allied with two rival factions – his old friends in Aagan Iisou, and his new ally Kagetora in Stoned. Sugawara spent the first few months of El Dorado trying to play both sides, but heat between the three parties was impossible to avoid. At the end, he seemed to choose Stoned, but only for him to kick Kagetora out of the faction to take the leadership of it himself along with the Brahman Brothers. The stable was renamed Hell Demons, and it soon feuded with other stables created by the former members of Aagan Iisou to oppose it.

Sugawara and the Brahman Brothers won the UWA World Trios Championship and defended the Championships 2 times. He would lead Hell Demons for several months before being kicked out of the stable with little fanfare by the Brahman Brothers. The UWA World Trios Championship was then vacated, and Sugawara allied with Toru Owashi's faction "Animal Planets", although did not officially join them. His participation caused dissension within the Animal Planets, with Bear Fukuda in particular being distrustful of Sugawara. Sugawara won the vacant UWA World Trios Championship for the second time with Toru Owashi and Nobutaka Araya by defeating the Hell Demons Braman Shu, Brahman Kei, and Go.

In the summer of 2008, the entirety of Aagan Iisou left El Dorado. Suguwara and Owashi vacated the UWA World Trios Championship on their way out. Aagan Iisou initially planned to tour as a unit, but instead went their separate ways.

=== Pro Wrestling Zero1 (2006–present) ===
Although Sugawara had been wrestling for Pro Wrestling Zero1 since 2006, it was after El Dorado's closure that he joined full-time. He formed a tag team with Minoru Fujita, winning with him the NWA Intercontinental Tag Team Champions and NWA International Lightweight Tag Team Champions. Sugawara and Fujita hold the record for the longest NWA Intercontinental Tag Team Championship title reign of 399 days. On March 2 Sugawara and Tsuyoshi Kikuchi put their belts (Kikuchi's NWA World Junior Heavyweight Championship (Zero1 version) and Sugawara's Zero1 International Junior Heavyweight title) on the line in a match on 11th Anniversary show. Sugawara was victorious and became the double champion. Sugawara lost both titles to Jonathan Gresham on May 4, 2013. He regained them from Mineo Fujita on November 3, 2014, before losing them to local wrestler Jason Lee in Hong Kong on December 28, 2014.

=== Return to Dragon Gate (2009–2010) ===
Sugawara returned to Dragon Gate in late 2009, aligning with the stable Veteran-gun. He was at first considered a representative of Zero-One rather than a full member of the roster. He teased reuniting with Anthony W. Mori and reforming the Royal Brothers, but instead joined up with top heel stable Real Hazard.

On January 19, 2010, he won the company's Battle of Tokyo Tournament. Real Hazard was soon renamed Deep Drunkers, led by Kenichiro Arai. On October 13, 2010, the Deep Drunkers were forced to split up, after losing a match against World–1 (BxB Hulk, Masato Yoshino and Naruki Doi), but after the match Doi turned on his partners to form a new stable with Sugawara, Kzy, Naoki Tanizaki and Yasushi Kanda. On October 25 Sugawara, Tanisaki and Kanda defeated CIMA, Gamma and Genki Horiguchi to win the Open the Triangle Gate Championship. They would lose the title to CIMA, Dragon Kid and Ricochet on December 26, 2010.

== Championships and accomplishments ==
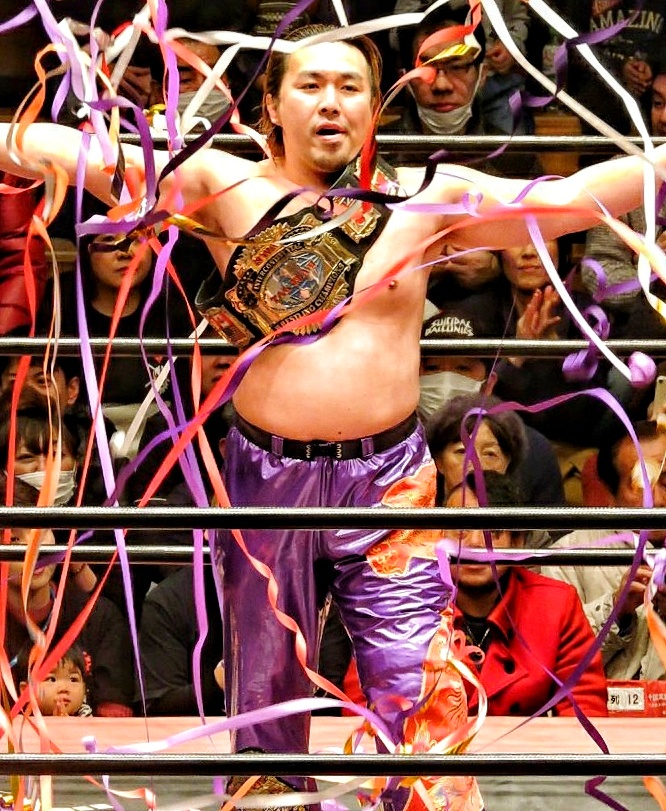
In Pro Wrestling Zero1, Sugawara is a former NWA Intercontinental Tag Team Champion

- Dragon Gate

- Open the Triangle Gate Championship (2 times) – with Yasushi Kanda and Kzy (1), and Yasushi Kanda and Naoki Tanizaki (1)
- Battle of Tokyo Tournament (2010)

- El Dorado Wrestling

- UWA World Trios Championship (2 times) – with Brahman Shu and Brahman Kei (1) and Nobutaka Araya and Toru Owashi (1)

- Pro-Wrestling Basara

- UWA World Trios Championship (1 time, current) – with Shuji Kondo and Toru Owashi

- Pro Wrestling Zero1-Max/Pro Wrestling Zero1

- International Junior Heavyweight Championship (3 times)
- NWA Intercontinental Tag Team Championship (2 times) – with Minoru Fujita (1) and Masato Tanaka (1)
- NWA International Lightweight Tag Team Championship (8 times, current) – with Minoru Fujita (1), Kaijin Habu Otoko (1), Tsuyoshi Kikuchi (1), Mineo Fujita (1), "brother" Yasshi (2) , Ikuto Hidaka (1) and Naruki Doi (1)
- NWA World Junior Heavyweight Championship (2 times)
- Fire Festival (2021)
- Tenkaichi Junior (2016)
- Junior Tag Tournament (2024) – with Takumi Baba

=== Lucha de Apuesta record ===
Winner (wager)	Loser (wager)	Location	Event	Date	Notes
Hair	Takuya Sugawara	Anthony W. Mori	Tokyo, Japan	September 17, 2004	(Note: Tag team match, where Sugawara teamed with Shuji Kondo and Mori with Ryo Saito.)
Hair	Anthony W. Mori	Takuya Sugawara	Tokyo, Japan	November 28, 2004	
