= International Junior Heavyweight Championship (Zero1) =

Professional wrestling championship

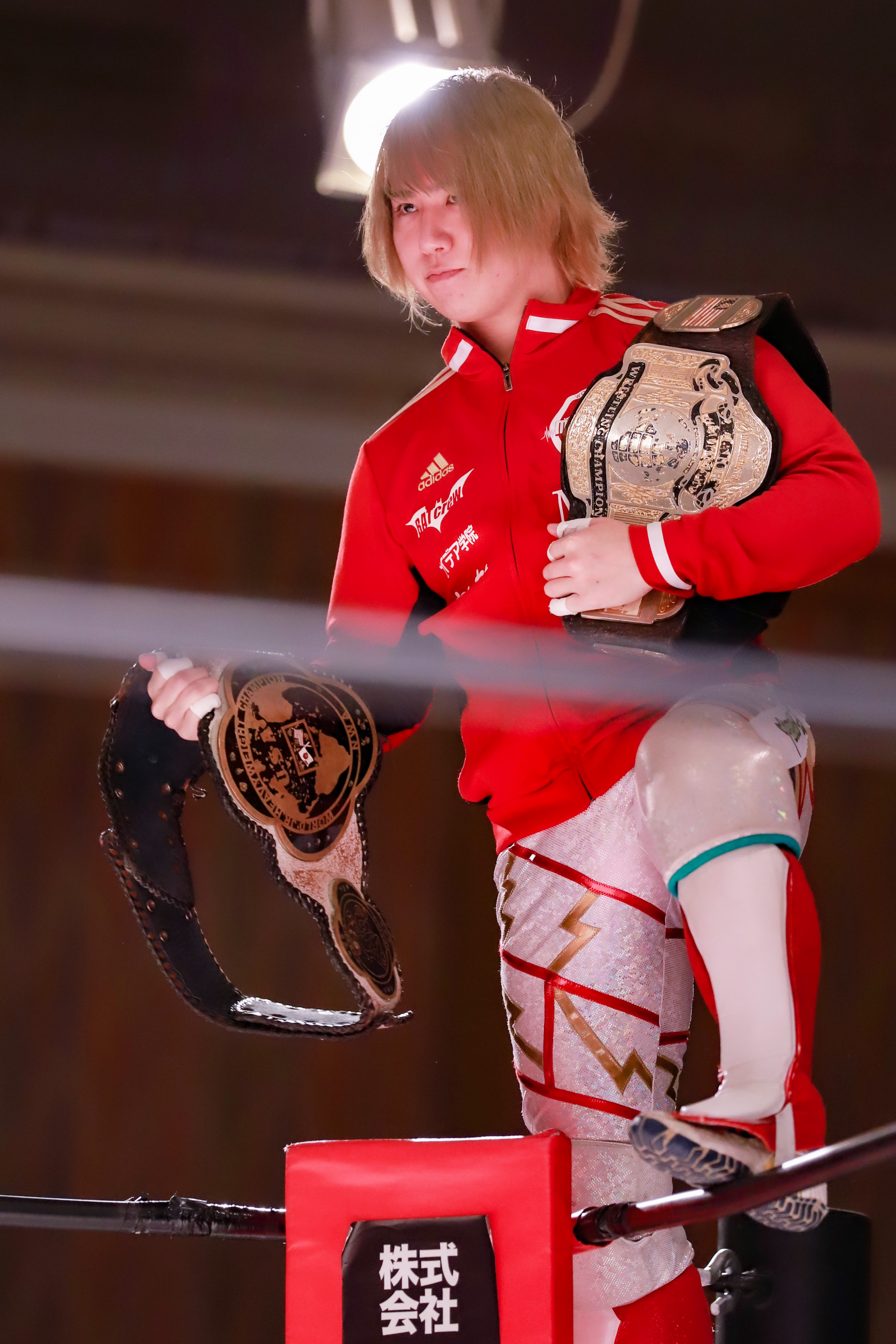
- Leo Isaka holding the International Junior Heavyweight title in his left hand

Details
- Promotion: Pro Wrestling Zero1
- Date established: June 29, 2002
- Current champion: Takumi Baba
- Date won: January 1, 2025

Other names
- NWA/UPW/Zero-One International Junior Heavyweight Championship; Zero-One/UPW/World-1 International Junior Heavyweight Championship; AWA/Zero1-Max/UPW/World-1 International Junior Heavyweight Championship; AWA World Junior Heavyweight Championship; Zero1-Max International Junior Heavyweight Championship
Statistics
- First champion: Leonardo Spanky
- Most reigns: Ikuto Hidaka (5)
- Longest reign: Ikuto Hidaka (540 days)
- Shortest reign: Tatsuhito Takaiwa (<1 day)

The International Junior Heavyweight Championship is a professional wrestling championship in Japanese promotion Pro Wrestling Zero1 (Zero1, formerly Pro Wrestling Zero-One and Pro Wrestling Zero1-Max), contested exclusively among junior heavyweight (<100 kg (220 lb)) wrestlers. It was originally created on June 29, 2002, as the NWA/UPW/Zero-One International Junior Heavyweight Championship, symbolizing Pro Wrestling Zero-One (Zero-One)'s relationship with the National Wrestling Alliance (NWA) and Ultimate Pro Wrestling (UPW); Leonardo Spanky defeated Smelly to become the first champion. When Zero-One left the NWA on October 31, 2004, the title was renamed to incorporate Steve Corino's Pro Wrestling World-1 (Word-1), becoming the Zero-One/UPW/World-1 International Junior Heavyweight Championship. The name was again altered when the newly renamed Pro Wrestling Zero1-Max (Zero1-Max) joined the AWA Superstars of Wrestling (AWA) alliance on February 28, 2005, with the title becoming known as the AWA/Zero1-Max/UPW/World-1 International Junior Heavyweight Championship. On August 26, 2006, after Minoru Fujita won the annual Tenkaichi Jr. tournament, Fujita renamed the championship to the AWA World Junior Heavyweight Championship. When Zero1-Max left the AWA on December 15, 2007, it was renamed again to the Zero1-Max International Junior Heavyweight Championship. Finally, when the company changed its name to Pro Wrestling Zero1 in 2008, the championship followed and became known as the Zero1 International Junior Heavyweight Championship.

There have been a total of 27 recognized champions, who have had a combined 39 official reigns. The current champion is Takumi Baba who is in his second reign.

== Title history ==
Key
No.	Overall reign number
Reign	Reign number for the specific champion
Days	Number of days held
Defenses	Number of successful defenses
<1	Reign lasted less than a day
+	Current reign is changing daily

No.	Champion	Championship change			Reign statistics			Notes	Ref.
No.	Champion	Date	Event	Location	Reign	Days	Defenses	Notes	Ref.
National Wrestling Alliance (NWA) / (UPW) Ultimate Pro Wrestling / Pro Wrestling Zero-One (Zero-One)
1	Leonardo Spanky	June 29, 2002	Creation Tour	Sapporo, Japan	1	79	3	Spanky defeated Smelly to become the inaugural champion.	
2	Low Ki	September 16, 2002	Genesis II	Tokyo, Japan	1	349	8		
3	Wataru Sakata	August 31, 2003	Summer Festival Tour	Gifu, Japan	1	225	1	This match was also for Sakata's World-1 Junior Heavyweight Championship.	
—	Vacated	April 12, 2004	—	—	—	—	—	Sakata vacated the championship so he could focus on the defenses of his World-1 title.	
4	Tatsuhito Takaiwa	May 16, 2004	Cashonor	Tokyo, Japan	1	216	5	Takaiwa defeated Tony Stradlin for the vacant championship.	
AWA Superstars of Wrestling (AWA) / Pro Wrestling Zero1-Max (Zero1-Max) / Ultimate Pro Wrestling (UPW) / Pro Wrestling World-1 (World-1)
5	Super Crazy	December 18, 2004	AWA Heavyweight Title Contender Tournament Tour	Chiba, Japan	1	117	0	Crazy later unifies the World-1 Junior Heavyweight Championship into the International Junior Heavyweight Championship.	
6	Ikuto Hidaka	April 14, 2005	Outburst Revolution Tour	Tokyo, Japan	1	318	4		
7	Takuya Sugawara	February 26, 2006	Happening Tour	Tokyo, Japan	1	151	1		
8	Tatsuhito Takaiwa	July 27, 2006	Fire Festival Tour	Osaka, Japan	2	<1	0	This match was also for Takaiwa's WWA World Junior Light Heavyweight Championship.	
—	Vacated	July 27, 2006	—	—	—	—	—	Takaiwa vacated the championship so it could be decided in the 2006 Tenkaichi Jr. tournament.	
AWA Superstars of Wrestling (AWA) / Pro Wrestling Zero1-Max (Zero1-Max)
9	Minoru Fujita	August 26, 2006	Tenkaichi Junior	Kyoto, Japan	1	146	2	Fujita defeated Takuya Sugawara in the finals of the 2006 Tenkaichi Jr. tournament to become the new champion.	
10	Ikuto Hidaka	January 19, 2007	Over the Max Tour	Tokyo, Japan	2	30	0		
11	Tatsuhito Takaiwa	February 18, 2007	Make the Emotion Tour	Tokyo, Japan	3	77	0		
—	Vacated	May 6, 2007	—	—	—	—	—	The championship was vacated due to Takaiwa suffering a knee injury.	
12	Dick Togo	June 20, 2007	Dynamo Tour	Tokyo, Japan	1	128	1	Togo won a 9-man battle royal to become the new champion.	
13	Ikuto Hidaka	October 26, 2007	Innovation Tour	Tokyo, Japan	3	89	1		
Pro Wrestling Zero1-Max (Zero1-Max)
14	Masaaki Mochizuki	January 23, 2008	Zero1-Max 3rd Anniversary	Tokyo, Japan	1	155	3		
15	Ikuto Hidaka	June 26, 2008	Dauntless Tour	Tokyo, Japan	4	262	5		
16	Sonjay Dutt	March 15, 2009	Wrestler's 1	Tokyo, Japan	1	259	0		
—	Vacated	November 29, 2009	—	—	—	—	—	The championship was vacated so it could be contested in the 2009 Tenkaichi Jr. tournament.	
17	Ikuto Hidaka	November 29, 2009	Wrestler's 7 ~ Grant Me My Wish!	Tokyo, Japan	5	540	6	Hidaka defeated Prince Devitt in the finals of the 2009 Tenkaichi Jr. tournament to become the new champion.	
National Wrestling Alliance (NWA) / Pro Wrestling Zero1 (Zero1)
18	Takuya Sugawara	May 23, 2011	House show	Tokyo, Japan	2	712	10		
Pro Wrestling Zero1 (Zero1)
19	Jonathan Gresham	May 4, 2013	Big Bang	Tokyo, Japan	1	135	1	This match was also contested for Sugawara's NWA World Junior Heavyweight Championship. During his reign, Gresham additionally held the Zero1 USA World Junior Heavyweight Championship.	
—	Vacated	September 16, 2013	—	—	—	—	—	Gresham vacated both the International and NWA Junior Heavyweight titles so they could be contested in the 2013 Tenkaichi Jr. tournament.	
20	Hub	September 16, 2013	11th Tenkaichi Jr.: Finals	Tokyo, Japan	1	174	3	Hub defeated Mineo Fujita in the finals of the 2013 Tenkaichi Jr. tournament to become the new champion. Hub additionally won the vacant NWA World Junior Heavyweight Championship.	
21	Jason Lee	March 9, 2014	Zero1_Thirteen	Tokyo, Japan	1	194	3	This match was contested for the NWA World Junior Heavyweight Championship.	
22	Mineo Fujita	September 19, 2014	Tenkaichi Junior	Tokyo, Japan	1	45	1	This match was also contested for the NWA World Junior Heavyweight Championship.	
23	Takuya Sugawara	November 3, 2014	Hi no Kokudai Hanabi	Kumamoto, Japan	3	55	1	This match was also contested for the NWA World Junior Heavyweight Championship.	
24	Jason Lee	December 28, 2014	Winter Fever 4	Hong Kong	2	63	1	This match was promoted by Zero1 Hong Kong and was also contested for the NWA World Junior Heavyweight Championship.	
25	Minoru Tanaka	March 1, 2015	Zero1_Fourteen	Tokyo, Japan	1	222	3	This match was also contested for the NWA World Junior Heavyweight Championship.	
26	Shinjiro Otani	October 11, 2015	Change the World	Tokyo, Japan	1	481	2	This match was also contested for the NWA World Junior Heavyweight Championship.	
27	Kotaro Suzuki	February 3, 2017	Shinsei Zero1 Dream Series: Hakai no Jin	Tokyo, Japan	1	265	3	This match was also contested for the NWA World Junior Heavyweight Championship.	
28	Sean Guinness	October 26, 2017	Dream Series Aki no Jin Korakuen Taikai	Tokyo, Japan	1	129	1	This match was also contested for the NWA World Junior Heavyweight Championship.	
29	Isami Kodaka	March 4, 2018	Dream Series Sozo no Jin	Tokyo, Japan	1	(Note: The exact date on which Kodaka were stripped of the championship is not known, which means that his reign lasted between 242 and 265 days.)	2	This match was also contested for the NWA World Junior Heavyweight Championship.	
—	Vacated	November 2018	—	—	—	—	—	Kodaka was stripped of both the International and NWA Junior Heavyweight titles due to an injury.	
30	Sugi	November 24, 2018	Dream Series ~ Nenotsuki No Jin ~ Tenka-Ichi Junior Tournament 2018	Tokyo, Japan	1	403	2	Sugi defeated Hayata in the finals of the 2018 Tenkaichi Jr. tournament to become the new champion. Sugi additionally won the vacant NWA World Junior Heavyweight Championship.	
31	HUB	January 1, 2020	Happy New Year	Tokyo, Japan	2	247	1	This match was also contested for the NWA World Junior Heavyweight Championship.	
32	Shoki Kitamura	September 4, 2020	Youth Playback! It All Started Here! Shinjiro Otani To Asakura!	Tokyo, Japan	1	58	0	This match was also contested for the NWA World Junior Heavyweight Championship.	
33	El Lindaman	November 1, 2020	2020 Fire Festival Finals	Tokyo, Japan	1	310	1	This match was also contested for the NWA World Junior Heavyweight Championship.	
—	Vacated	September 7, 2021	—	—	—	—	—	Lindaman was stripped of both the International and NWA Junior Heavyweight titles after Gleat, Lindaman's home promotion, ends its working relationship with Zero1.	
34	Fuminori Abe	September 9, 2021	Zero1 20th Anniversary Year - 18th Tenkaichi Junior Tournament 2021 Final	Tokyo, Japan	1	213	5	Abe defeated Shoki Kitamura in the finals of the 2021 Tenkaichi Jr. tournament to become the new champion. Abe additionally won the vacant NWA World Junior Heavyweight Championship.	
35	Astroman	April 10, 2022	Zero1 Osu Premium Show Zero1 20th & 21st Anniversary Pro Wrestling	Tokyo, Japan	1	266	2	This match was also contested for the NWA World Junior Heavyweight Championship.	
36	Leo Isaka	January 1, 2023	Zero1 Happy New Year 2023	Tokyo, Japan	1	195	4	This match was also contested for the NWA World Junior Heavyweight Championship.	
37	Takumi Baba	July 15, 2023	Zero1 23rd Midsummer Festival	Tokyo, Japan	1	232	2	This match was also contested for the NWA World Junior Heavyweight Championship.	
38	Seiki Yoshioka	March 3, 2024	Zero1 23rd Anniversary	Tokyo, Japan	1	304	0	This match was also contested for the NWA World Junior Heavyweight Championship.	
39	Takumi Baba	January 1, 2025	Tochi Pro Happy New Year & Shinjiro Otani Aid ~ Stand Up Again And Again	Tokyo, Japan	2	496+	1	This match was also contested for the NWA World Junior Heavyweight Championship.	

== Combined reigns ==
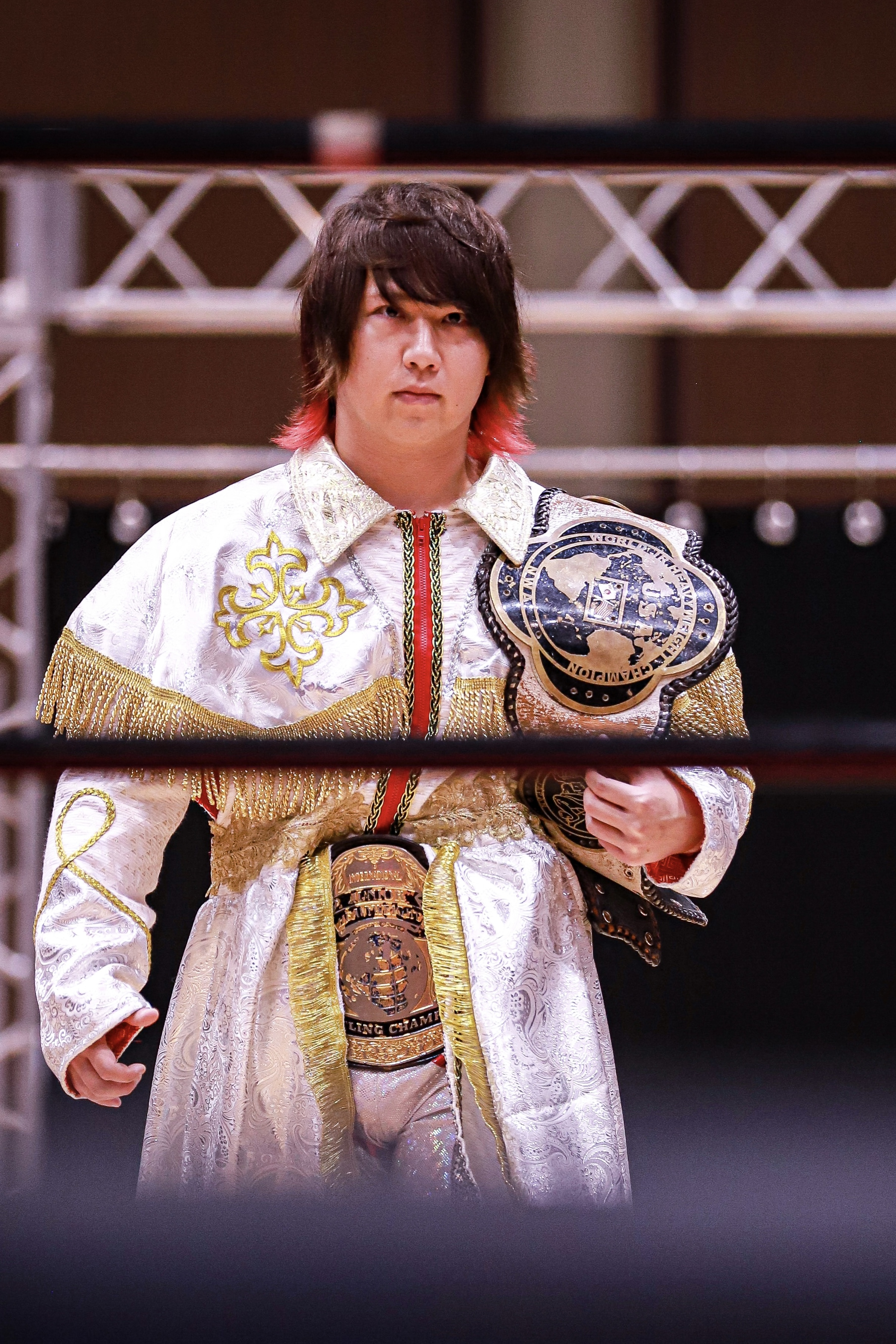
Former champion Leo Isaka, shown here also wearing the NWA World Junior Heavyweight Championship

As of May 12, 2026.

†	Indicates the current champion
¤	The exact length of at least one title reign is uncertain, so the shortest length is considered.

Rank	Wrestler	No. of reigns	Combined defenses	Combined days
1	Ikuto Hidaka	5	16	1,239
2	Takuya Sugawara	3	12	918
3	Takumi Baba †	2	3	728+
4	Shinjiro Otani	1	2	481
5	Hub	2	4	421
6	Sugi	1	2	403
7	Low Ki	1	8	349
8	El Lindaman	1	1	310
9	Seiki Yoshioka	1	0	304
10	Tatsuhito Takaiwa	3	5	293
11	Astroman	1	2	266
12	Kotaro Suzuki	1	3	265
13	Sonjay Dutt	1	0	259
14	Jason Lee	2	4	257
15	Isami Kodaka	1	2	¤242
16	Wataru Sakata	1	1	225
17	Minoru Tanaka	1	3	222
18	Fuminori Abe	1	5	213
19	Leo Isaka	1	4	195
20	Masaaki Mochizuki	1	3	155
21	Jonathan Gresham	1	1	135
22	Sean Guinness	1	1	129
23	Dick Togo	1	1	128
24	Super Crazy	1	0	117
25	Leonardo Spanky	1	3	79
26	Shoki Kitamura	1	0	58
27	Minoru Fujita	1	1	45

== See also ==
- List of National Wrestling Alliance championships
- NWA World Junior Heavyweight Championship (Zero1)
- NWA International Junior Heavyweight Championship
- WAR International Junior Heavyweight Championship
