= Soma Watanabe =

Japanese professional wrestler

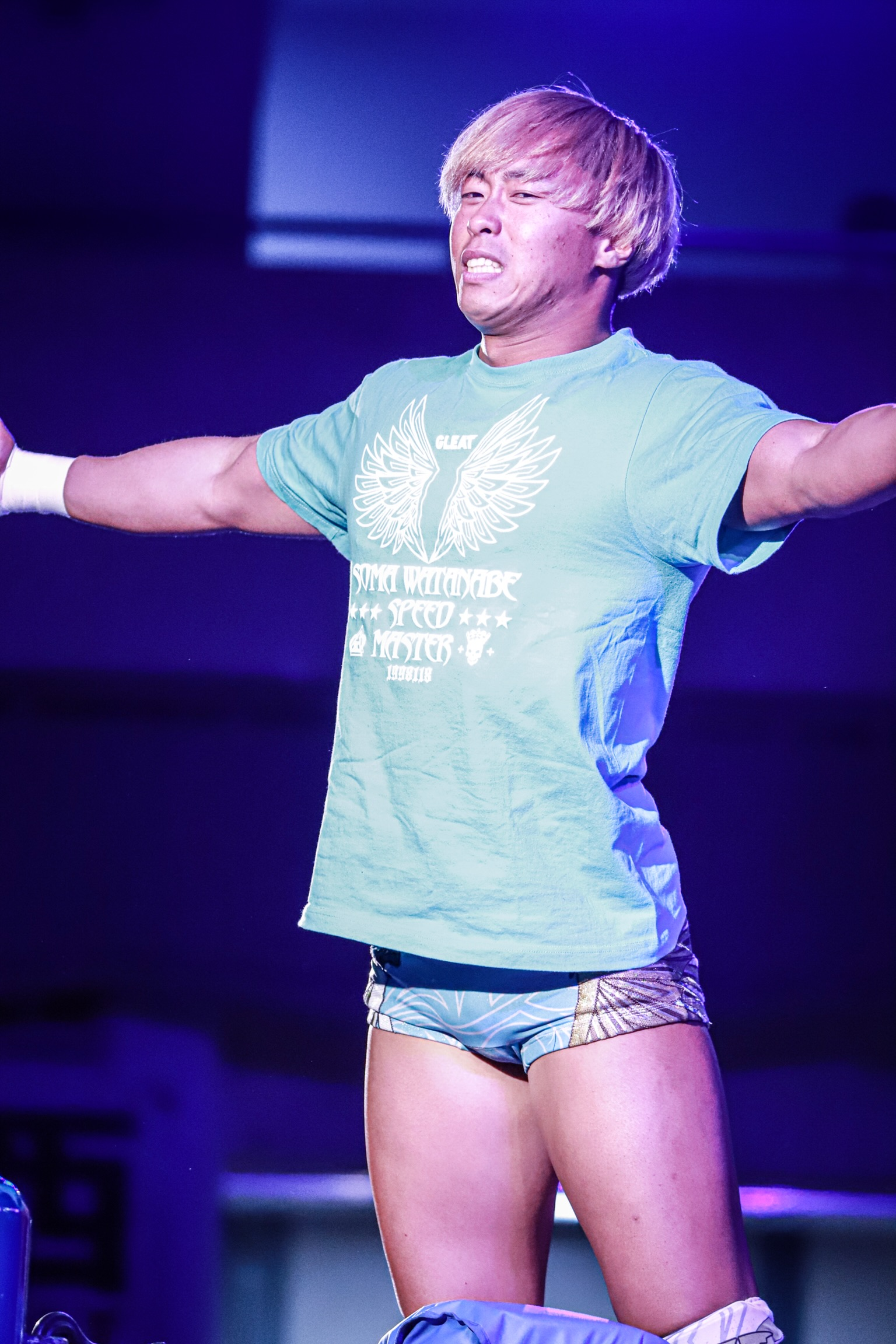
- Watanabe in February 2022

Personal information
- Born: 8 November 1998 (age 28) Kawagoe, Japan

Professional wrestling career
- Ring name: Pegaso Iluminar Soma Sumeragi Takeshiba Watanabe Soma Watanabe
- Billed height: 175 cm (5 ft 9 in)
- Billed weight: 70 kg (154 lb)
- Trained by: Shuji Kondo; Kaz Hayashi; Yusuke Kodama
- Debut: 2017

Soma Watanabe (渡辺 壮馬, Watanabe Sōma) is a Japanese professional wrestler and kickboxer. He wrestles for the Japanese wrestling promotion Gleat, where he is the current G-Infinity Champion with So Daimonji in his first reign. He is also a former Lidet UWF World Champion, a one-time G-Rush Champion and a one-time G-Rex Champion. Prior to his tenure at Gleat, Watanabe made appearances at wrestling events hosted by Wrestle-1 and Pro Wrestling Heat Up.

== Professional wrestling career ==
=== Wrestle-1 (2017–2020) ===
Watanabe made his professional wrestling debut on February 25, 2017 at a house show hosted by Pro-Wrestling A.C.E., a sub-promotion of Wrestle-1, where he wrestled Tatsuro Kami in a time-limit draw. During his tenure with Wrestle-1, Watanabe wore a mask and competed under the name of "Pegaso Iluminar." At W-1 Wrestle Wars on 21 March 2019, Watanbe teamed up with Kaz Hayashi and unsuccessfully challenged Alejandro and Masayuki Kono for the vacant Wrestle-1 Tag Team Championship.

Watanabe took part in multiple signature tournaments of the promotion. In 2019, he made his sole appearance in the Wrestle-1 Grand Prix, where he lost to Kumaarashi in the first round. His first appearance in the Wrestle-1 Tag League came in 2017, where he teamed up with Kaz Hayashi and competed in the event's A Block; the pair scored a total of four points after facing the teams of Manabu Soya and Daiki Inaba, Andy Wu and El Hijo del Pantera, and Shotaro Ashino and Kumaarashi, failing to qualify for the finals. At the final edition of the same event in 2019, he teamed up with Jun Tonsho, but failed to score any points in the A-Block, losing to T-Hawk and Shigehiro Irie, Shotaro Ashino and Yusuke Kodama, and Masayuki Kono and Alejandro.

During the onset of the COVID-19 pandemic, Wrestle-1 held its final event on April 1, 2020 at W-1 WRESTLE-1 Tour Trans Magic. Watanabe defeated Takanori Ito in the early stages of the show, and later participated in a battle royal, facing off against Cima, El Lindaman, Hiroshi Yamato, Jiro Kuroshio, Ryota Hama, Yasufumi Nakanoue, eventual winner Manabu Soya and several other members of the Wrestle-1 roster.

=== Gleat (2020–present) ===
After Wrestle-1's closure, Watanabe made his debut in Gleat at Gleat Ver. 0, the promotion's very first event, on October 16, 2020, where he lost to Kenoh in singles competition. During his tenure with the promotion, he participated in several title changes. At Gleat Ver. 33 on 10 September 2022, Watanabe teamed up with Yu Iizuka and unsuccessfully challenged the Voodoo Murders (Minoru Tanaka and Toshizo) for the All Asia Tag Team Championship, a title promoted at the time by AJPW. At Gleat Ver. 47 on 21 March 2023, Watanabe teamed up with El Lindaman to unsuccessfully challenge Bulk Orchestra (Check Shimatani and Hayato Tamura) for the G-Infinity Championship. At Gleat Ver. 14 on 30 December 2024, Watanabe defeated Hayato Tamura to win the G-Rex Championship.

Within Gleat, Watanabe competes in both professional wrestling and mixed martial arts bouts. At Gleat MMA Ver.0, on 14 December 2022, he lost to Shuya Arimura in a kickboxing bout.

=== Pro Wrestling Heat Up (2021–present) ===
Watanabe has competed in multiple events hosted by Pro Wrestling Heat Up. On May 16, 2021, Watanabe and Kaz Hayashi won the Heat Up Universal Tag Team Championship. The pair later vacated the title after two successful defenses.

=== New Japan Pro Wrestling (2023) ===
On March 1, 2023, Watanabe participated in the All Star Junior Festival, promoted by New Japan Pro Wrestling. He joined Yoh and Kazuma Sumi to defeat Fuminori Abe, Ryo Hoshino, and Akira Jumonji in a six-man tag team match.

== Championships and accomplishments ==
- Gleat
  - G-Rex Championship (1 time)
  - G-Infinity Championship (1 time, current) – with So Daimonji
  - G-Rush Championship (1 time)
  - Lidet UWF World Championship (1 time)
  - G PROWRESTLING Tournament (2021)
  - First Grand Slam Chanpion
- Pro Wrestling Heat Up
  - Heat Up Universal Tag Team Championship (1 time) – with Kaz Hayashi

== Kickboxing record ==
Professional Kickboxing record
0 wins, 1 losses, 0 draws
Date	Result	Opponent	Event	Location	Method	Round	Time
2022-12-14	Loss	(Japan) Shuya Arimura	Gleat MMA Ver.0	Tokyo, Japan	Decision (unanimous)	3	3:00
