= Jun Tonsho =

Japanese wrestler (born 1999)

- Tonsho in April 2023

Personal information
- Born: 27 March 1999 (age 27) Shiki, Japan

Professional wrestling career
- Ring name: Brass Knuckles Jun Jun Tondokoro Jun Tonsho
- Billed height: 173 cm (5 ft 8 in)
- Billed weight: 78 kg (172 lb)
- Trained by: Hiroshi Yamato; Kai
- Debut: 2016

Jun Tonsho (頓所隼, Tonsho Jun) is a Japanese professional wrestler working as a freelancer and is best known for his tenures with the Japanese promotions Wrestle-1 and Gleat.

== Professional wrestling career ==
=== Japanese independent circuit (2016–present) ===
As a freelancer, Tonsho regularly competes for various promotions of the Japanese independent scene. At Tenryu Project Survive The Revolution Vol. 15 on January 9, 2022, he teamed up with Rey Paloma and Shigehiro Iriem falling short to Kenichiro Arai, Kohei Sato and Masayuki Kono in the semifinals of a Tenryu Project WAR World 6-Man Tag Team Championship tournament.

=== Wrestle-1 (2016–2020) ===
Tonsho made his professional wrestling debut in Wrestle-1 at W-1 Pro-Wrestling Training Academy 1st Graduation Class on March 30, 2016, where he fell short to Yasufumi Nakanoue in singles competition. Along with Seigo Tachibana, who was also in the first graduating class, he subsequently participated in the promotion's main tours to gain experience.

During his time with the promotion, he chased for various accomplishments. He competed in the inaugural tournament of the Wrestle-1 Result Championship in which he fell short to Hiroki Murase in the first rounds. At W-1 WRESTLE-1 Tour 2019 6th Anniversary on September 23, 2019, Tonsho unsuccessfully challenged El Hijo del Pantera for the Wrestle-1 Cruiser Division Championship.

He competed in various of the promotion's signature events. He made his only appearance in the Wrestle-1 Tag League at the 2019 edition, where he teamed up with Pegaso Iluminar, bottoming the block A with no points after competing against the teams of T-Hawk and Shigehiro Irie, Shotaro Ashino and Yusuke Kodama, and Masayuki Kono and Alejandro.

On April 1, 2020, at W-1 WRESTLE-1 Tour 2020 Trans Magic, Wrestle-1 has held its last event before closure where Tonsho teamed up with Andy Wu and El Hijo del Pantera to defeat #StrongHearts (Cima, Issei Onitsuka and Seiki Yoshioka).

=== Gleat (2021–present) ===
Tonsho made his debut in Gleat at GLEAT G PROWRESTLING Ver. 6 on September 29, 2021, where he defeated Rekka in singles competition. During his time with the promotion, he chased for various titles, and was part of two stables, "60 Seconds" and "The Sick". He competed in the inaugural tournament of the G-Rush Championship in which he fell short to El Lindaman in the first rounds. At GLEAT 5th Anniversary on July 1, 2026, he teamed up with Rock Iwasaki to unsuccessfully challenge Black Generation International (Kaito Ishida and Kazma Sakamoto) for the G-Infinity Championship.

At GLEAT G PROWRESTLING Ver. 57 on August 13, 2023, Tonsho unsuccessfully challenged Minoru Tanaka for All Japan Pro Wrestling's Gaora TV Championship. He often competed in AJPW-promoted events such as the AJPW New Age Chronicle-Z2 from December 21, 2023, where he teamed up with Kuma Arashi and Soma Watanabe to defeat Seigo Tachibana, Takanori Ito and Takuro Niki.
