= Saito Brothers =

Japanese professional wrestling tag team

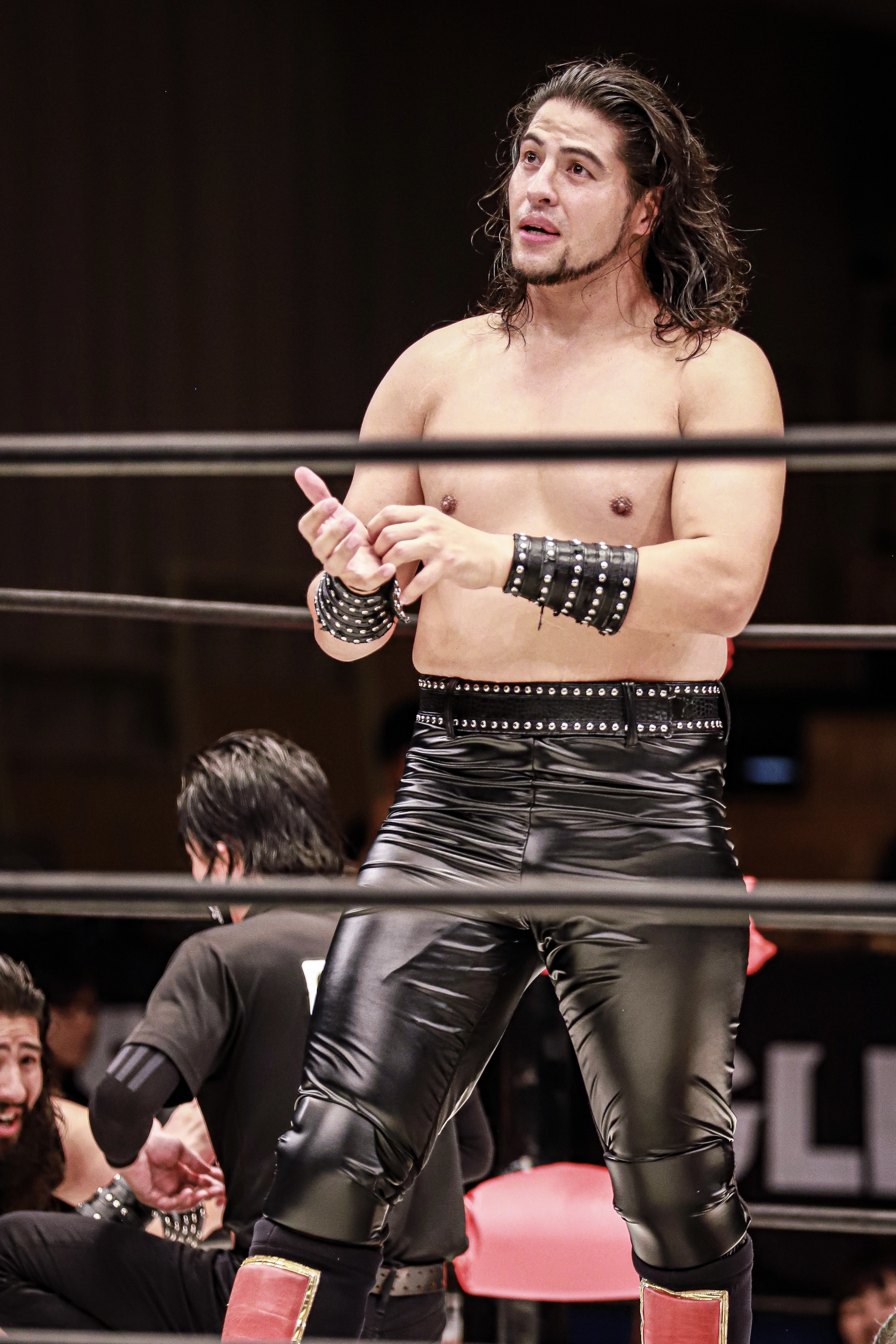
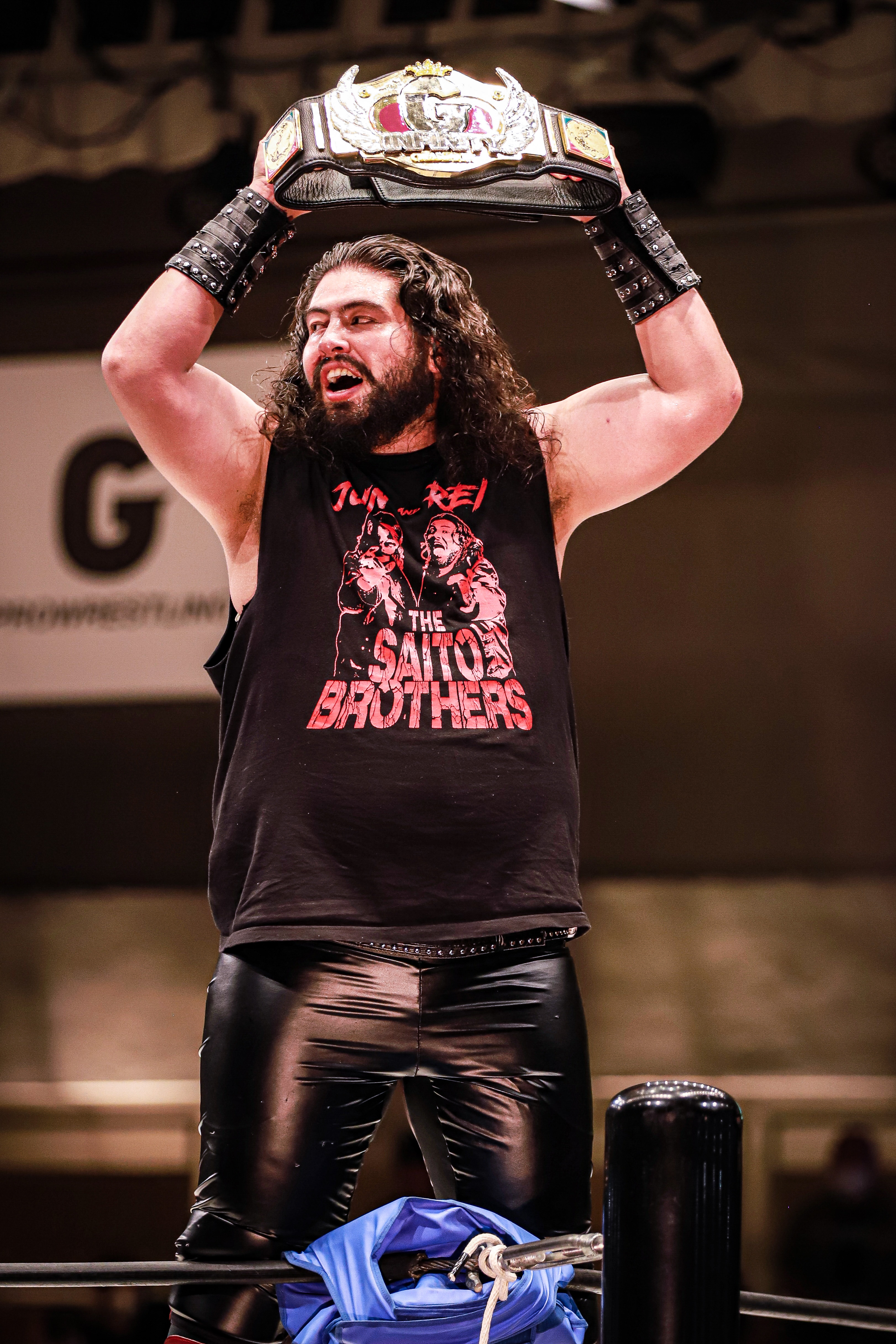
- Jun Saito and Rei Saito

Tag team
- Members: Jun Saito; Rei Saito
- Billed heights: Jun: 1.93 m (6 ft 4 in); Rei: 1.92 m (6 ft 3 1/2 in)
- Combined billed weight: Combined: 584 lb (265 kg); 254 lb (115 kg) (Jun); 340 lb (150 kg) (Rei)
- Debut: June 9, 2021
- Years active: 2021–present

The Saito Brothers are a professional wrestling tag team composed of Japanese American twin brothers Jun Saito (斉藤ジュン, Saitō Jun) and Rei Saito (斉藤レイ, Saitō Rei). They were born on December 19, 1986, in Kakuda, Miyagi, Japan to an American father and Japanese mother. They are signed with the Japanese professional wrestling promotion All Japan Pro Wrestling, where they were aligned with the Voodoo Murders stable, before they expanded the Saito Brothers from a tag team into a stable and added new members such as "Mr.Saito" Naruki Doi and Senor Saito. They are also known for their work with various promotions of the Japanese independent scene.

== Sumo career ==
In September 2009, after having prowess in the United States as American football players, the Saito brothers joined the Dewanoumi stable to compete in sumo. They were given the shikona (ring name) of Fujinoumi Jun (藤の海 順) and Fujinohana Rei (藤の花 礼). Jun achieved his highest rank of makushita 47 in July 2013 and retired in May 2017; Rei achieved his highest rank of sandanme 16 in July 2012 and retired in September 2017.

== Professional wrestling career ==
=== All Japan Pro Wrestling (2021–present) ===
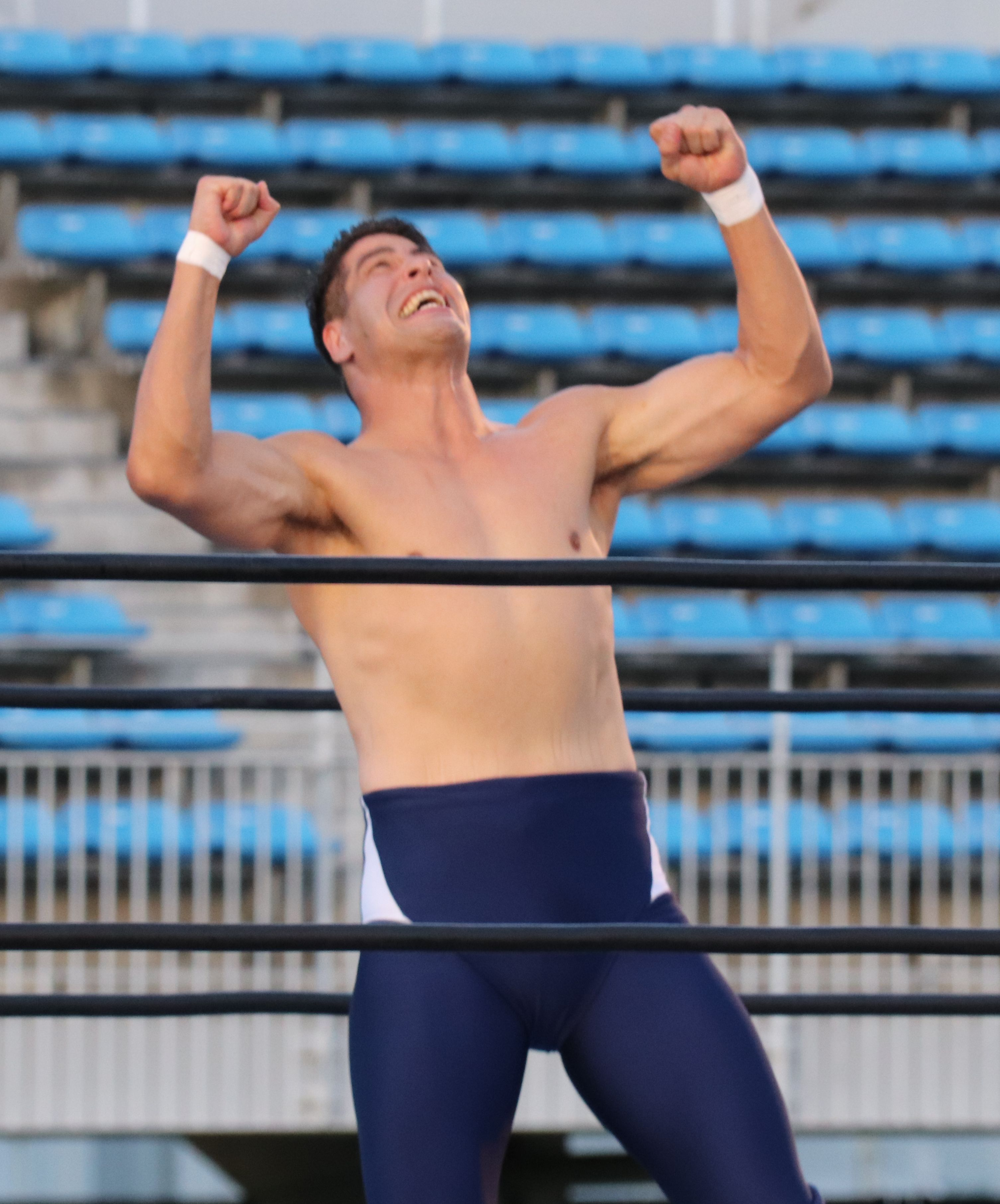
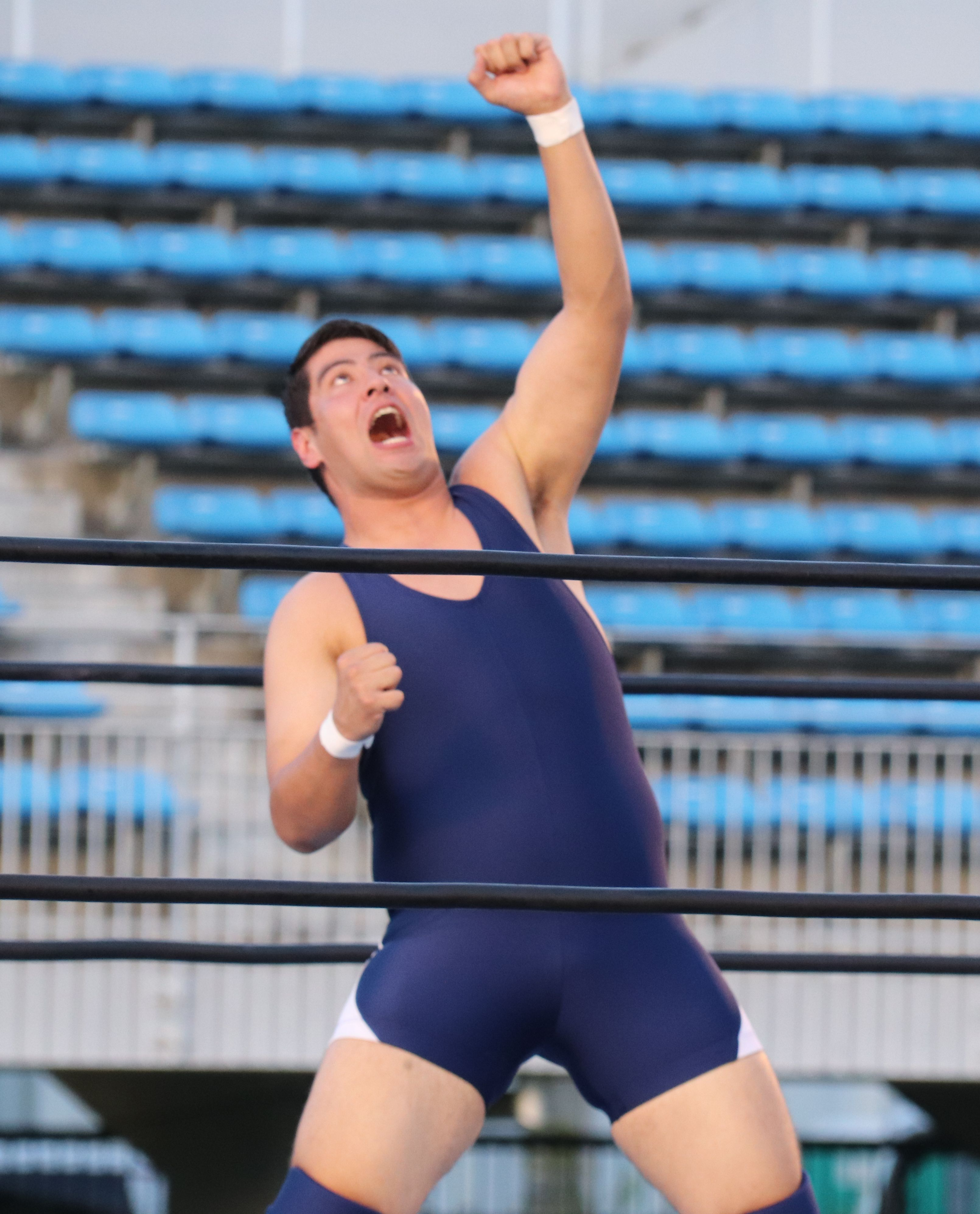
Jun and Rei in 2021

In December 2020, Jun and Rei had an introductory test to earn a training spot in the All Japan Pro Wrestling (AJPW) dojo, which they passed and were accepted into the dojo. They made their professional wrestling debut on June 9, 2021, losing to the veteran team of Ryuki Honda and Takao Omori. On June 26 at AJPW's Champion Night, Jun defeated Rei in their first singles bout with Jun defeating Rei by submission with the Boston Crab. As is customary for most professional wrestlers, Jun and Rei spent most of his matches losing to other, more experienced wrestlers, which would help put over other wrestlers while at the same time give them some in-ring, televised, experience. On August 15, Jun took part in the 2021 Ōdō Tournament, losing in the first round to Suwama in under three minutes. From November 13 to December 5, they took part in the World's Strongest Tag Determination League losing all of their matches. On November 13, in the first day of the tournament, they announced that they were going on a learning excursion. The following months, they traveled to the United States and the United Kingdom to work with AJPW's partner promotion, Major League Wrestling (MLW) for a short stay. They also worked for various promotions in the American and British independent circuit, before returning to All Japan in September 2022.

On September 18, they made their return from their excursion at AJPW's 50th Anniversary Show, where they teamed with Cyrus to face Shuji Ishikawa, Kohei Sato and Yukio Naya in a winning effort. Later that night, Saito Brothers challenged Shotaro Ashino and Ryuki Honda to a title match for the World Tag Team Championship, which they failed to win on the next day. On October 2, Jun and Rei attacked Jake Lee and Yuma Aoyagi and became the newest members of Voodoo Murders, turning heel in the process. From November 13 until December 7, they took part in the 2022 World's Strongest Determination Tag League, finishing the tournament with a record of three wins and four losses, failing to advance to the finals of the tournament.

On January 2, 2023, Saito Brothers were defeated by Naoya Nomura and Yuma Aoyagi in a number one contenders to the World Tag Team Championship. From April 8 and May 7, Jun and Rei took part in the 2023 Champion Carnival, wrestling on separate blocks. Jun finishing the tournament with a record of three wins and four losses, while Rei finished the tournament with a record of four wins and three losses, both failing to advance to the finals of the tournament. On October 9, Saito Brothers defeated Kento Miyahara and Yuma Aoyagi to win the World Tag Team Championship. From November 12 until December 6, Saito Brothers took part in the 2023 World's Strongest Tag Determination League, finishing the tournament with a record of five wins and four losses, failing to win the tournament. Around the same time, Rei took part in DDT Pro-Wrestling's 2023 D-Oh Grand Prix, where he finished the tournament with a record of four wins, one loss, with a loss against Yukio Naya, in their head-to-head match, costing him a spot in the finals of the tournament. On February 12, Saito Brothers vacated the World Tag Team Championship, after Rei suffered a shoulder injury, causing them to miss a scheduled title defense against Kento Miyahara and Yuma Aoyagi on February 25. On February 23, Saito Brothers decided to vacate the G-Infinity Championship, after Rei's recovery from his injury would take for longer than initially anticipated.

Rei made his return from injury on March 9, alongside Jun announcing his return from injury, before challenging Hideki Suzuki and Suwama to a title match for the World Tag Team Championship, since they had never lost the titles. The defeated Suwama and Suzuki to regain the titles on March 30. Afterwards, Saito Brothers left Voodoo Murders, after Taru decided to withdrawing the stable from AJPW, following the positive fan reaction towards Saito Brothers and their rise of popularity. From April 18 until May 8, Saito Brothers were granted entry into the 2024 Champion Carnival, their first Champion Carnival tournament, wrestling separately in the same block. Rei was victorious over Jun in the head-to-head match between them, but he was left behind him in the final standings due to losing to Ryuki Honda on the final day. Meanwhile, Jun advance to finals of the tournament, after finishing his block with a record of five wins and two losses. On May 12, Jun was defeated by Kento Miyahara in the finals of the tournament.

On May 29, Saito Brothers stated that their ambitions are to capture all the belts in AJPW. Due to not being eligible to challenge for the World Junior Heavyweight Championship, they would align themselves with Naruki Doi, who dubbed himself as "Mr. Saito", leading them to challenge for the AJPW TV Six-Man Tag Team Championship. On June 24 at Dynamite Series, Jun, Rei and Doi faced Elpida's Ren Ayabe, Rising Hayato and Ryuki Honda in an elimination match, which they won, after Doi scored a direct pinfall victory over Hayato. This sparked a feud between The Saito Brothers and Elpida, with Doi challenging Hayato to a title match for the World Junior Heavyweight Championship, which Hayato accepted and Saito Brothers hinting that a new member would join them to even the odds against Elpida. On July 13, Doi defeated Hayato to win the World Junior Heavyweight Championship. Afterwards, he announced that he also wanted to challenge for the All Asia Tag Team Championship, on July 20, with his partner being "Senor Saito", which they failed to win from Musashi and Seiki Yoshioka on July 20. From November 13 until December 1, Saito Brothers took part in the 2024 World's Strongest Tag Determination League, finishing the tournament, with a clean record of six wins, advancing to the semifinals of the tournament. On December 8, Saito Brothers defeated Ryuki Honda and Ren Ayabe, and then Kento Miyahara and Davey Boy Smith Jr., in the semifinals and finals respectively, to win the 2024 World's Strongest Tag Determination League. As the reigning World Tag Team Champions, they went completely undefeated throughout the tournament, becoming the first team in history to achieve this feat and the first team to win the tournament unbeaten. This achievement saw them receive the Tag Team of the Year award by Tokyo Sports. On December 31, Jun defeated Davey Boy Smith Jr. to win the Triple Crown Heavyweight Championship for the first time. On February 9, 2025, Saito Brothers set a new record for most successful defenses of the World Tag Team Championship by making their eighth defense against Yuma and Atsuki Aoyagi. They lost the titles to Kento Miyahara and Yuma Aoyagi on March 9.

From April 9 and May 18, Saito Brothers were granted entry into the 2025 Champion Carnival, wrestling in separate blocks. Despite Jun failing to advance to the semifinals, Rei managed to advance from his block with a record of seven wins and three losses. On May 18. Rei defeated Hideki Suzuki in the semifinals by knockout, and then defeated Kento Miyahara in the final to win the tournament. On September 23, Jun lost the Triple Crown Heavyweight Championship against Kento Miyahara.

=== Japanese independent scene (2022–present) ===
The Saito Brothers regularly appear on the Japanese independent scene. At Infinity: New Year, an event promoted by Active Advance Pro Wrestling on January 9, 2023, they picked up a victory over Kotaro Yoshino and Taishi Takizawa. At Gleat's Ver. EX "Face-Off" Access 2 TDCH, on June 7, 2023, they defeated Bulk Orchestra (Check Shimatani and Hayato Tamura) to win the G-Infinity Championship, the first tag championships of their career.

=== Overseas excursion (2022) ===
Jun and Rei underwent a six-month foreign excursion in the first half of 2022, with most of their work spreading towards several promotions from the American scene and European scene. The first event they competed in was the January 21, 2022, episode of Fusion, promoted by Major League Wrestling, where they defeated Budd Heavy and Gnarls Garvin. At Banjaxed 3, an event promoted by Over the Top Wrestling on June 26, 2022, they fell short to The Kings of the North (Bonesaw and Damien Corvin).

== Championships and accomplishments ==
- All Japan Pro Wrestling
  - Triple Crown Heavyweight Championship (1 time) — Jun
  - World Tag Team Championship (3 times, current)
  - Champion Carnival (2025) — Rei
  - World's Strongest Tag Determination League (2024)
- Gleat
  - G-Infinity Championship (1 time)
- Immortal Championship Wrestling
  - ICW Dippin Donuts 24/7 Championship (1 time)
- Pro Wrestling Illustrated
  - Ranked Jun No. 38 of the top 500 singles wrestlers in the PWI 500 in 2025
  - Ranked Rei No. 87 of the top 500 singles wrestlers in the PWI 500 in 2025
  - Ranked Jun and Rei No. 69 of the top 100 tag teams in the PWI Tag Team 100 of 2023
- Tokyo Sports
  - Newcomer Award (2023)
  - Best Tag Team Award (2024)
