= G-Rex Championship =

Professional wrestling championship

- The G-Rex Championship title belt

Details
- Promotion: Gleat
- Date established: December 2021
- Current champion: Atsushi Kotoge
- Date won: October 9, 2026
Statistics
- First champion: El Lindaman
- Most reigns: Kaito Ishida and El Lindaman (2 reigns)
- Longest reign: Hayato Tamura (366 days)
- Shortest reign: Soma Watanabe (12 days)
- Oldest champion: Atsushi Kotoge (40 years, 11 months and 21 days)
- Youngest champion: Soma Watanabe (26 years, 1 month and 22 days)
- Heaviest champion: Hayato Tamura (103 kg (227 lb))
- Lightest champion: Soma Watanabe (70 kg (150 lb))

The G-Rex Championship (Japanese: G-REX王座, Hepburn: Jī Rekkusu Ōza) is a professional wrestling championship in the Japanese promotion Gleat. The title is the first to be created by the promotion.

The inaugural champion is El Lindaman, who was crowned at G Prowrestling Ver. 18, on February 22, 2022, after winning a 12-man tournament. The current champion is Atsushi Kotoge, who won the title at Gleat Ver. EX ~ GLEAT vs. Kyoteki on October 09, 2026.

== History ==
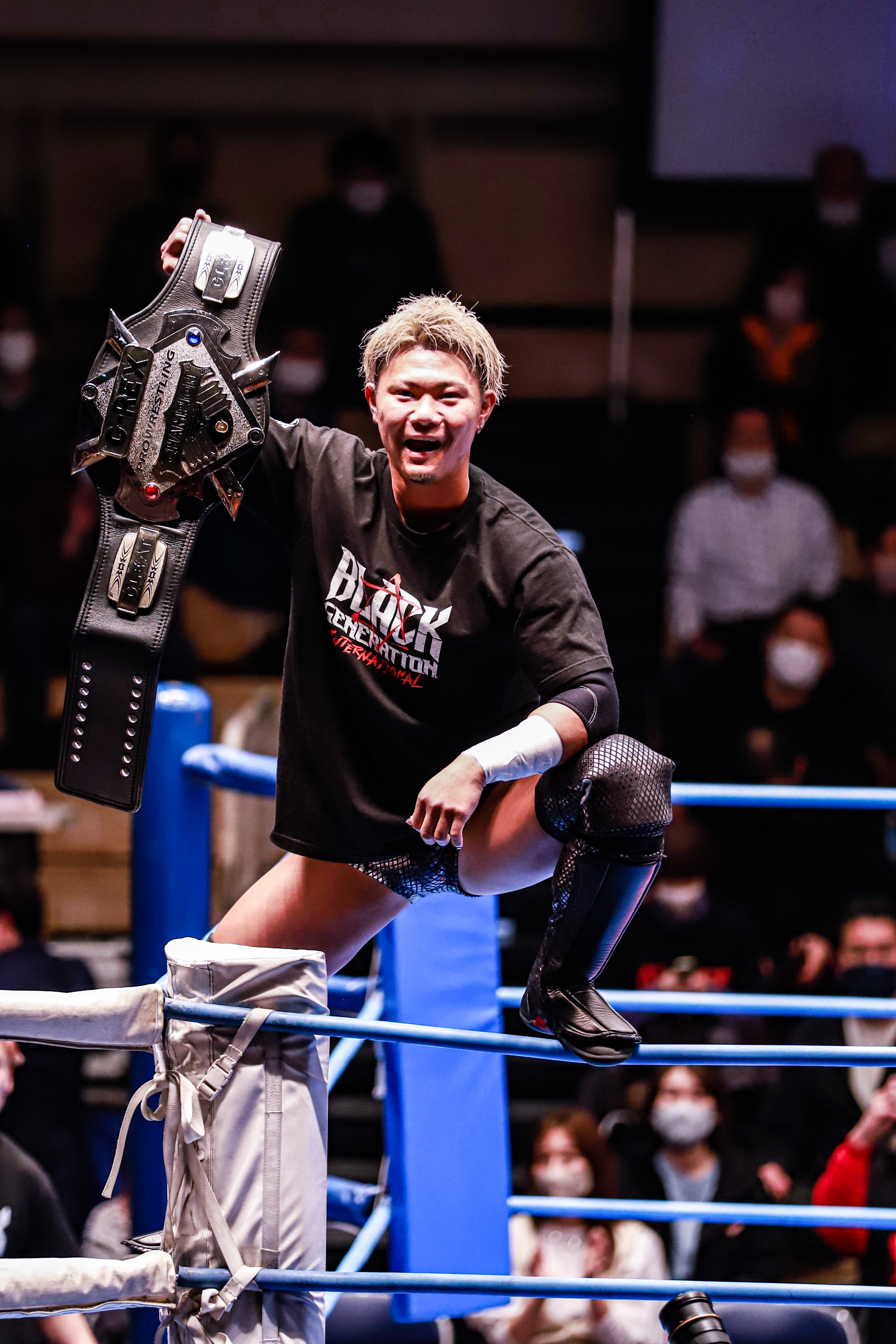
Kaito Ishida with the original belt design in March 2023.

Gleat was founded in 2020, after Lidet Entertainment sold all its shares of Pro Wrestling Noah to CyberAgent. Lidet's President Hiroyuki Suzuki, wanting to continue his involvement with professional wrestling, announced the formation of Gleat in August 2020, alongside Kiyoshi Tamura, Kaz Hayashi and Nosawa Rongai. The promotion features two brands: G Prowrestling, a traditional puroresu brand, and Lidet UWF, a shoot style brand inspired by UWF International.

In December 2021, Gleat announced the creation of the G-Rex Championship for its G Prowrestling brand. A 12-man tournament was held from January 26, 2022, to February 22 to crown the inaugural champion.

=== Inaugural tournament ===
Round 1 January 26	Round 2 February 6 & 11
Soma Watanabe	13:10
El Lindaman	Pin
El Lindaman	Pin
Issei Onitsuka	11:36
Block A
Minoru Tanaka	Pin
Daijiro Matsui	6:30
Minoru Tanaka	17:20
T-Hawk	Pin
Hayato Tamura	Pin
Yu Iizuka	9:22
Kaz Hayashi	10:24
Yu Iizuka	Sub
Block B
Takanori Ito	Pin
Ryuichi Kawakami	18:06
Takanori Ito	Pin
Cima	19:57

Semifinals; February 22
El Lindaman	Pin
T-Hawk	16:41
Hayato Tamura	Pin
Takanori Ito	14:21

Final; February 22
El Lindaman	Pin
Hayato Tamura	16:54

== Reigns ==
As of November 14, 2026.

Key
No.	Overall reign number
Reign	Reign number for the specific champion
Days	Number of days held
Defenses	Number of successful defenses
+	Current reign is changing daily

No.	Champion	Championship change			Reign statistics			Notes	Ref.
No.	Champion	Date	Event	Location	Reign	Days	Defenses	Notes	Ref.
1	El Lindaman	February 22, 2022	G Prowrestling Ver. 18	Tokyo, Japan	1	320	7	Defeated Hayato Tamura in a tournament final to become the inaugural champion.	
2	Kaito Ishida	January 8, 2023	Gleat Ver. 5	Osaka, Japan	1	94	1		
3	T-Hawk	April 12, 2023	G Prowrestling Ver. 49: Invader	Tokyo, Japan	1	262	5		
4	Hayato Tamura	December 30, 2023	Gleat Ver. 7	Tokyo, Japan	1	366	8		
5	Soma Watanabe	December 30, 2024	Gleat Ver. 14	Tokyo, Japan	1	12	0		
6	Kaito Ishida	January 11, 2025	Gleat Ver. 15	Osaka, Japan	2	171	4		
7	Katsuhiko Nakajima	July 1, 2025	Gleat Ver. 19 ~ 4th Anniversary Special Event	Tokyo, Japan	1	100	1		
8	El Lindaman	October 9, 2025	Gleat Ver. EX ~ GLEAT vs. Kyoteki	Tokyo, Japan	2	365	5		
9	Atsushi Kotoge	October 9, 2026	Gleat Ver. EX ~ GLEAT vs. Kyoteki	Tokyo, Japan	1	36+	1		

== Combined reigns ==
As of November 14, 2026.

†	Indicates the current champion

Rank	Wrestler	No. of reigns	Combined defenses	Combined days
1	El Lindaman	2	12	685
2	Hayato Tamura	1	8	366
3	Kaito Ishida	2	5	265
4	T-Hawk	1	5	262
5	Katsuhiko Nakajima	1	1	100
6	Atsushi Kotoge †	1	1	36+
7	Soma Watanabe	1	0	12

== See also ==
- Professional wrestling in Japan
