= G-Infinity Championship =

Professional wrestling championship

- The current belts design (2022–present)

Details
- Promotion: Gleat
- Date established: July 2022
- Current champions: Black Generation International (So Daimonji and Soma Watanabe)
- Date won: October 9, 2026
Statistics
- First champions: Bulk Orchestra (Kazma Sakamoto and Ryuichi Kawakami)
- Most reigns: As an individual (2 reigns): Cima; Kuroshio Tokyo Japan; Kazma Sakamoto; Kaito Ishida; Ryuichi Kawakami
- Longest reign: Bulk Orchestra (Hayato Tamura and Check Shimatani) (276 days)
- Shortest reign: Chris Ridgeway and Drew Parker (2 days)
- Oldest champion: Kaz Hayashi (50 years, 9 months and 24 days)
- Youngest champion: Tetsuya Izuchi (22 years, 11 months and 16 days)
- Heaviest champion: Rei Saito (304 lb (138 kg))
- Lightest champion: Check Shimatani and Takuma (158 lb (72 kg))

The G-Infinity Championship (Japanese: G-INFINITY王座, Hepburn: Jī Infiniti Ōza) is a professional wrestling tag team championship in the Japanese promotion Gleat. The title is the first tag team title to be created by the promotion and the second overall.

== History ==
Gleat was founded in 2020, after Lidet Entertainment sold all its shares of Pro Wrestling Noah to CyberAgent. Lidet's President Hiroyuki Suzuki, wanting to continue his involvement with professional wrestling, announced the formation of Gleat in August 2020, alongside Kiyoshi Tamura, Kaz Hayashi and Nosawa Rongai. The promotion features two brands: G Prowrestling, a traditional puroresu brand, and Lidet UWF, a shoot style brand inspired by UWF International.

In July 2022, Gleat announced the creation of the G-Infinity Championship for its G Prowrestling brand. A four-team tournament was held from August 20, 2022, to August 24 to crown the inaugural champions. The tournament was won by Bulk Orchestra (Kazma Sakamoto and Ryuichi Kawakami). After the match, Nobuhiro Shimatani and Hayato Tamura, who are also members of the Bulk Orchestra stable, announced their challenge to the title.

When Hayato Tamura suffered from an injury incurred on October 9, 2022, #StrongHearts (Shigehiro Irie and T-Hawk) became interim champions.

On December 19, 2024, The Rascalz (Zachary Wentz and Trey Miguel) were forced to relinquish the title after Miguel sustained a broken finger, which prevented him from defending the title as scheduled.

=== Inaugural tournament ===
Semi-finals; August 20
Bulk Orchestra (Kazma Sakamoto and Ryuichi Kawakami)	Pin
60 Seconds (Jun Tonsho and Keiichi Sato)	11:19
Kaz Hayashi and Takanori Ito	11:40
#StrongHearts (Cima and T-Hawk)	Pin

Final; August 24
Bulk Orchestra	Pin
#StrongHearts	13:52

== Reigns ==
There have been a total of fifteen reigns shared between fifteen different teams consisting of twenty-five distinctive champions, one interim reign and four vacancies. The current champions are So Daimonji and Soma Watanabe who are in their first reign as a team as well as individually.

Key
No.	Overall reign number
Reign	Reign number for the specific team—reign numbers for the individuals are in parentheses, if different
Days	Number of days held
Defenses	Number of successful defenses
+	Current reign is changing daily

No.	Champion	Championship change			Reign statistics			Notes	Ref.
No.	Champion	Date	Event	Location	Reign	Days	Defenses	Notes	Ref.
1	Bulk Orchestra (Kazma Sakamoto and Ryuichi Kawakami)	August 24, 2022	G Prowrestling Ver. 31	Tokyo, Japan	1	11	0	Defeated #StrongHearts (Cima and T-Hawk) in the final of a four-team tournament to win the inaugural title.	
2	Bulk Orchestra (Check Shimatani and Hayato Tamura)	September 4, 2022	G Prowrestling Ver. 32	Osaka, Japan	1	276	6		
—	#StrongHearts (Shigehiro Irie and T-Hawk)	October 30, 2022	G Prowrestling Ver. 37	Sapporo, Japan	—	21	0	Lineal champions Check Shimatani and Hayato Tamura were originally scheduled to defend the title against Kaz Hayashi and Cima at this event, but were pulled due to Tamura not being cleared to compete after having suffered an injury in early October. Shigehiro Irie and T-Hawk defeated Hayashi and Cima to become the interim champions. On November 19, 2022, Irie and T-Hawk were defeated by lineal champions Shimatani and Tamura.	
3	Saito Brothers (Jun Saito and Rei Saito)	June 7, 2023	Gleat Ver. EX "Face-Off" Access 2 TDCH	Tokyo, Japan	1	261	11		
—	Vacated	February 23, 2024	Gleat Ver. 9	Osaka, Japan	—	—	—	Title vacated after Rei Saito suffered a dislocated shoulder.	
4	Coelacanths (Cima and Kaz Hayashi)	March 13, 2024	Gleat Ver. 10	Tokyo, Japan	1	110	4	Defeated #StrongHearts (Seiki Yoshioka and T-Hawk) in a tournament final to win the vacant titles.	
5	Black Generation International (Kaito Ishida and Tetsuya Izuchi)	July 1, 2024	Gleat Ver. 12	Tokyo, Japan	1	97	2		
6	The Rascalz (Zachary Wentz and Trey Miguel)	October 6, 2024	Gleat Ver. Mega in Osaka	Osaka, Japan	1	74	1		
—	Vacated	December 19, 2024	—	—	—	—	—	Title vacated after Trey Miguel suffered a broken finger.	
7	Kuroshio Tokyo Japan and Seigo Tachibana	December 30, 2024	Gleat Ver. 14	Osaka, Japan	1	21	0	Defeated #StrongHearts (El Lindaman and T-Hawk) to win the vacant titles.	
8	Tokyo Bad Boys (SBK and Takuma)	January 19, 2025	G Prowrestling Ver. 83	Tokyo, Japan	1	133	5		
9	Issei Onitsuka and Takehiro Yamamura	June 1, 2025	Gleat Ver. 17	Tokyo, Japan	1	38	1		
—	Vacated	July 9, 2025	—	—	—	—	—	Title vacated after Issei Onitsuka retired from professional wrestling.	
10	Cima and Kuroshio Tokyo Japan	October 9, 2025	Gleat Ver. EX ~ GLEAT vs. Kyoteki	Tokyo, Japan	1 (2, 2)	32	0	Defeated Anti-Gle Monsters (Brass Knuckles Jun and Ryuichi Kawakami) to win the vacant titles.	
—	Vacated	November 10, 2025	—	—	—	—	—		
11	Black Generation International (Kaito Ishida and Kazma Sakamoto)	December 13, 2025	Gleat Ver. 100 ~ Premium Edition	Osaka, Japan	1 (2, 2)	233	5	Defeated El Lindaman and Takehiro Yamamura in the tournament finals to win the vacant titles.	
12	Quiet Storm and Ryuichi Kawakami	August 3, 2026	Gleat Sayonara Face	Tokyo, Japan	1 (1, 2)	46	1		
13	Chris Ridgeway and Drew Parker	September 18, 2026	Gleat Underground Pro Wrestling 1st Season	Tokyo, Japan	1	2	0		
14	G. Sharpe and TJP	September 20, 2026	Gleat Ver. 31	Tokyo, Japan	1	19	0		
15	Black Generation International (So Daimonji and Soma Watanabe)	October 9, 2026	Gleat Ver. EX ~ Gleat Vs. Kyoteki 2026	Tokyo, Japan	1	35+	0		

== Combined reigns ==
As of November 13, 2026.

=== By team ===
†	Indicates the current champions

Rank	Team	No. of reigns	Combined defenses	Combined days
1	Bulk Orchestra (Check Shimatani and Hayato Tamura)	1	6	276
2	Saito Brothers (Jun Saito and Rei Saito)	1	11	261
3	Black Generation International (Kaito Ishida and Kazma Sakamoto)	1	5	233
4	Tokyo Bad Boys (SBK and Takuma)	1	2	133
5	Coelacanths (Cima and Kaz Hayashi)	1	4	110
6	Black Generation International (Kaito Ishida and Tetsuya Izuchi)	1	2	97
7	The Rascalz (Zachary Wentz and Trey Miguel)	1	1	74
8	Quiet Storm and Ryuichi Kawakami	1	1	46
9	Issei Onitsuka and Takehiro Yamamura	1	2	38
10	Black Generation International † (So Daimonji and Soma Watanabe)	1	0	35+
11	Cima and Kuroshio Tokyo Japan	1	0	32
—	#StrongHearts (Shigehiro Irie and T-Hawk)	—	0	21
12	Kuroshio Tokyo Japan and Seigo Tachibana	1	0	20
13	G. Sharpe and TJP	1	0	19
14	Bulk Orchestra (Kazma Sakamoto and Ryuichi Kawakami)	1	0	11
15	Chris Ridgeway and Drew Parker	1	0	2

=== By wrestler ===
Rank	Wrestler	No. of reigns	Combined defenses	Combined days
1	Kaito Ishida	2	7	330
2	Check Shimatani	1	6	276
2	Hayato Tamura	1	6	276
4	Jun Saito	1	11	261
4	Rei Saito	1	11	261
6	Kazma Sakamoto	2	5	244
7	Cima	2	4	142
8	SBK	1	2	133
8	Takuma	1	2	133
10	Kaz Hayashi	1	4	110
11	Tetsuya Izuchi	1	2	97
12	Trey Miguel	1	1	74
12	Zachary Wentz	1	1	74
14	Ryuichi Kawakami	2	1	57
15	Kuroshio Tokyo Japan	2	0	52
16	Quiet Storm	1	1	46
17	Issei Onitsuka	1	2	38
17	Takehiro Yamamura	1	2	38
19	So Daimonji †	1	0	35+
19	Soma Watanabe †	1	0	35+
—	Shigehiro Irie	—	0	21
—	T-Hawk	—	0	21
21	Seigo Tachibana	1	0	20
22	G. Sharpe	1	0	19
22	TJP	1	0	19
24	Chris Ridgeway	1	0	2
24	Drew Parker	1	0	2

== See also ==
- Professional wrestling in Japan
