= Oriental Wrestling Entertainment =

Chinese professional wrestling promotion

- Type: Private
- Industry: Professional wrestling Sports entertainment
- Founded: 2017; 9 years ago in Shanghai, China
- Founder: Fu Huayang
- Defunct: March 12, 2021; 5 years ago
- Headquarters: Shanghai, China
- Area served: Worldwide
- Key people: Fu Huayang (CEO); Cima (President); Michael Nee (Vice President)
- Products: Television; Films; Merchandise; Live events
- Services: Licensing
- Owner: Fu Huayang
- Website: www.orientalwrestlingentertainment.com

Oriental Wrestling Entertainment
- Traditional Chinese: 東方職業摔角
- Simplified Chinese: 东方职业摔角
- Literal meaning: eastern professional shuai jiao
Transcriptions
Standard Mandarin
- Hanyu Pinyin: dōngfāng zhíyè shuāijiǎo

Oriental Wrestling Entertainment (OWE) (Chinese: 东方职业摔角) was a Chinese-based professional wrestling promotion founded in 2017. OWE shows normally combined wrestling with musical performances by the C-pop all-girls group SNH48. The promotion promoted one championship as part of their events. OWE had working relationships with the U.S.-based All Elite Wrestling (AEW), Future Stars of Wrestling, and Mexican The Crash Lucha Libre promotions. In 2019, OWE ceased operations in China. After OWE unsuccessfully tried to relocate to Cambodia, the promotion ceased all operations in 2021.

== History ==
While the concept of professional wrestling has been well established in Europe and North America since the 19th century, and in Japan since the end of World War II, China had no exposure to professional wrestling prior to the turn of the millennium. The first Chinese professional wrestling promotion, China Wrestling Entertainment, was created in 2004, promoting traditional professional wrestling events, but struggled to stay profitable. In 2017, Chinese film director Fu Huayang created Oriental Wrestling Entertainment, based out of Shanghai, starting a talent search amongst over 200,000 applicants that all had a martial arts background, selecting a group of 50 people to be trained for professional wrestling.

In early 2018, OWE started a working relationship with Dragon Gate, featuring trainees from OWE working at Dragon Gate events and Dragon Gate main-stay Cima training them, helping OWE to promote its first official show, "The Legend of the Dragon" held on February 2, in Shanghai, featuring the Dragon Gate wrestlers and OWE's roster. On May 7, Cima announced that he, T-Hawk, El Lindaman and Takehiro Yamamura were all leaving Dragon Gate, relocating from Japan to China to be involved with OWE. Cima was announced as the head coach and the President for OWE and began training the rookies.

OWE later began a partnership with Las Vegas, Nevada based Future Stars of Wrestling, sending CIMA and three trainees to FSW shows as well as several members of the FSW roster traveling to China. Cima and several OWE students also appeared for other promotions, such as the Australasian Wrestling Federation (AWF), Wrestle-1, and DDT Pro-Wrestling shows.

On January 8, 2019, the newly created All Elite Wrestling (AEW) U.S.-based promotion announced that they had reached a partnership agreement with Oriental Wrestling Entertainment that would include OWE wrestlers working for AEW and vice versa. In January 2019, Mexican based The Crash Lucha Libre promotion announced that they had reached a deal with OWE to collaborate on wrestling events in the future. On March 26, OWE signed a video-on-demand television deal with Nothing Else On TV to distribute their content in the United Kingdom and Worldwide, becoming the first "Sino-British" wrestling agreement in professional wrestling. On March 31, OWE announced their first active championship, the Dragon's Legend Championship, with the inaugural champion to be crowned during the promotion's OWE First Time Japan shows in Osaka and Tokyo on April 18 and 20, while also becoming the first Chinese professional wrestling promotion to promote a show in Japan, which both sold out. The first night of the show was broadcast by Japanese television network Fighting TV Samurai and featured wrestlers from Wrestle-1, whom OWE as a working relationship. On April 23, OWE announced a television deal with Jiangsu Television, which would see the company's programming brought to one billion Chinese viewers.

On June 26, 2019, OWE announced a plan to expand their product in the United Kingdom in September, while also announcing the establish of UK-based brand and new titles. The plans would be due to disagreements between OWE and NEO TV owner Sean McMahon, while also claiming that OWE made broken promises and made misconduct towards him with OWE later offering refunds to attendees of the tour., OWE folded in 2021.

== Style and cultural influences ==
Oriental Wrestling Entertainment presents shows and in-ring performances to the culture of mainland China, adjusting the professional wrestling concept to their audience. Chinese wrestler Ho Ho Lun described the difference between OWE and other companies who have promoted wrestling as "OWE is putting wrestling into Kung Fu, whereas people such as The Slam have strived to put Kung Fu into wrestling". Most of OWE's Chinese roster have a martial arts, especially Shaolin Kung Fu, background with the style and concepts of the martial arts influencing the in-ring product and presentation.

Part of OWE's presentation focuses on educating spectators on the details of professional wrestling, such as videos prior to matches explaining that matches can be won by a 3-fall pinfall. During events the commentary is broadcast over the public address system in the arena, helping guide the fans on whom to cheer for and so on. In Asian culture it is generally considered disrespectful for people to be loud or boo, which in turn leads to the fans either remaining quiet and politely clapping during matches, or generally cheering the action without booing any of the in-ring competitors. Most of the heels (the "bad guys") have been foreigners. OWE shows have been described as variety shows, combining martial arts exhibits by the OWE roster, musical performances from C-pop acts such as SNH48 and wrestling matches.

Another aspect of their presentation is the impact of the Chinese government rules and standards for entertainment events. OWE Vice President Michael Nee explained that "Typical wrestling can be a little too violent. If we try to copy the Japanese way and put that into the Chinese market, our product will be killed by the government". As a result of the cultural restrictions and in an effort to present a more "Chinese" product OWE focuses on the culture of Chinese martial arts and spreading awareness on a global scale, presenting wrestling angles, storylines and in ring characters very differently and more sedate compared to western companies such as WWE.

Due to this, governmental control and censorship of the Chinese Communist Party in addition to increasing economic issues in the marketplace and uncertainty facing the country, it was reported in late 2019 that the promotion would cease all operations in China. OWE would leave China before relaunching and incorporating in Cambodia. OWE eventually went defunct in 2021, with most of the Japanese wrestlers like Cima and T-Hawk moving to a new promotion in Gleat.

== OWE Openweight Championship ==
OWE Openweight Championship

Details
- Promotion: Oriental Wrestling Entertainment
- Date established: 2019
- Current champion: Shigehiro Irie
- Date won: November 24, 2019
Statistics
- First champion: Zhao Junjie
- Most reigns: All titleholders (1 reign)
- Longest reign: Shigehiro Irie (2,444+ days)
- Shortest reign: Zhao Junjie
- Oldest champion: Shigehiro Irie (31 years, 241 days)
- Youngest champion: Zhao Junjie
- Heaviest champion: Shigehiro Irie (253 lb)
- Lightest champion: Zhao Junjie

Key
| No. | Overall reign number |
| Reign | Reign number for the specific champion |
| Days | Number of days held |
| <1 | Reign lasted less than a day |
| + | Current reign is changing daily |

| No. | Champion | Championship change | | | Reign statistics | | Notes | Ref. |
| No. | Champion | Date | Event | Location | Reign | Days | Notes | Ref. |
|---|---|---|---|---|---|---|---|---|
| 1 | Zhao Junjie | 2019 | N/A | N/A | 1 | N/A | The exact length of this reign is uncertain. | |
| 2 | Shigehiro Irie | November 24, 2019 | OWE Stronghearts vs OWE | Fukuoka, Japan | 1 | 2,444+ | | |

== Broadcasters ==
Domestic:

- Jiangsu Television (2019–present, currently broadcasting weekly highlights show Baichang Daren)

International:

- Fighting TV Samurai (2019–present, Japan, dubbed with Japanese commentary)

Worldwide:

- Nothing Else On TV (2019, online linear television service, live-streaming episodes)
- FITE TV (2020–present, internet streaming service, live-streaming episodes)

== Roster ==
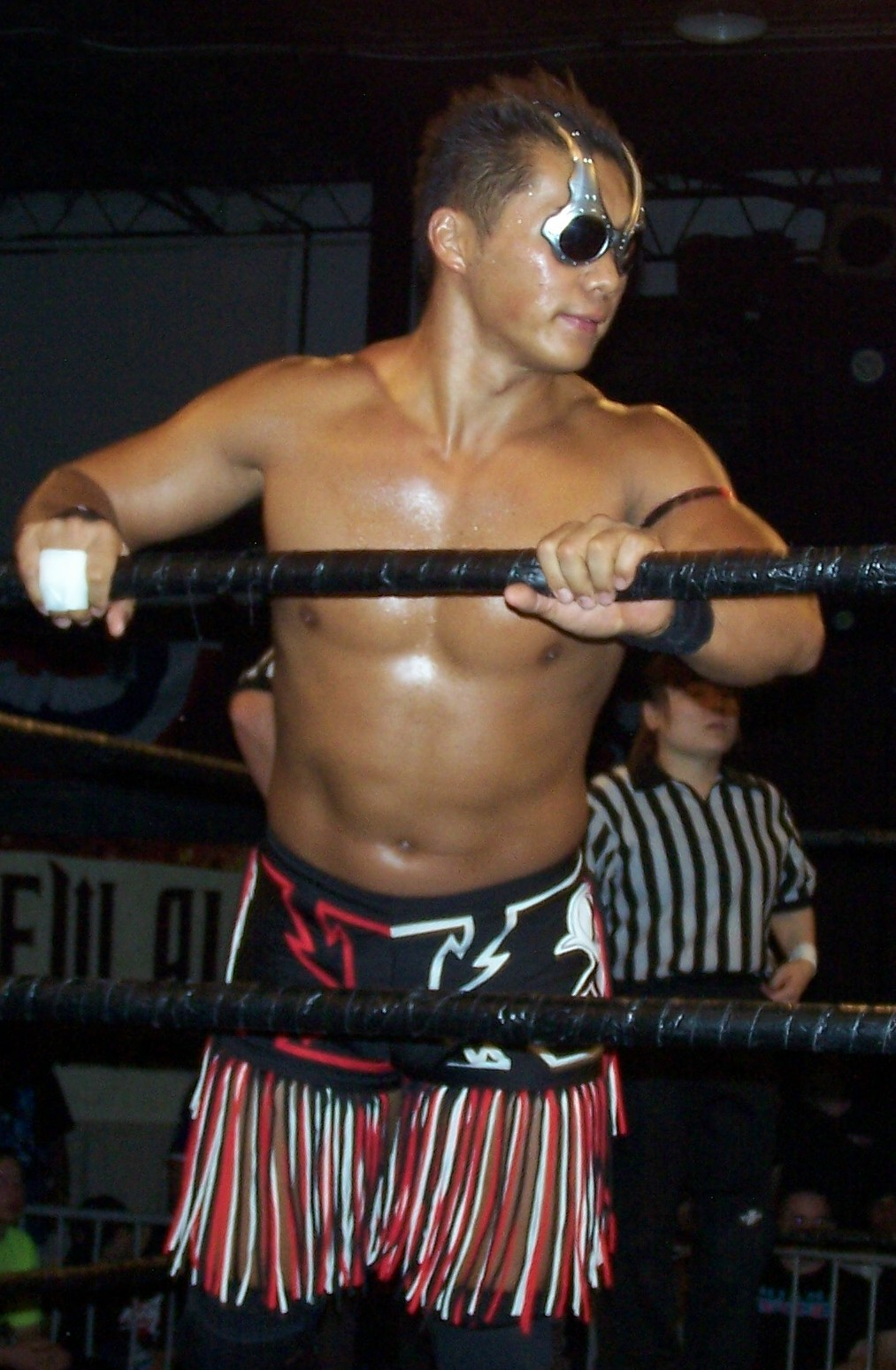
OWE head coach Cima

OWE has a permanent roster of 35 Chinese wrestlers (Note: Some from the group are still only training.) who are all under a 10-year contract and are provided training facilities and accommodations in the same vein as C-pop groups backed by record labels. OWE also has four Japanese wrestlers under full-time contracts and usually brings in foreign wrestlers on a show-by-show basis.

Male roster

| Ring name | Real name | Notes | Ref(s). |
|---|---|---|---|
| Captain Achilles Ben | Uncertain | Member of "Team E", originally billed as "A-Ben: | |
| Sugar Brown | Uncertain | FSW representative, member of "Real Money Brothers" | |
| Jake Cafe | Uncertain | FSW representative | |
| Sun Chao | Uncertain | Member of "Team E" | |
| Mao Chenxiang | Uncertain | Member of "Team W" | |
| Cima | Nobuhiko Oshima | Head trainer, President | |
| The Commando | Duan Yingnan | | |
| Duan Dihang | Uncertain | Member of "Team W" | |
| Damian Drake | Uncertain | FSW representative, member of "Midnight Marvels" | |
| The General | Uncertain | | |
| Yang Hao | Uncertain | Member of "Team O" | |
| Fan Hewei | Uncertain | Member of "Team E" | |
| Tang Huaqi | Uncertain | Member of "Team O" | |
| Minor Gregory Jade | Uncertain | FSW representative | |
| Wang Jin | Uncertain | Member of "Team O" | |
| Gao Jingjia | Uncertain | Member of "Team O" | |
| Zhao Junjie | Uncertain | Member of "Team W" | |
| Clutch Kucera | Uncertain | FSW representative, member of "Real Money Brothers" | |
| El Lindaman | Yuga Hayashi | Japanese | |
| Mario Bugatti | Unknown | | |
| CheChe Tovey | Christopher Tovey 克里斯托弗 台湾虎 | Uxbridge Unicorns" | |
| Remy Marcel | Uncertain | FSW representative, part of "WG" | |
| Fan Qiuyang | Uncertain | Member of "Team E" | |
| Spyder Warrior | Uncertain | FSW representative, member of "Midnight Marvels" | |
| Buffa | Uncertain | | |
| Titan | Uncertain | | |
| T Hawk | Takuya Onodera | Japanese | |
| Wuljijimuren | Uncertain | Member of "Team O" | |
| Chen Xiangke | Uncertain | Member of "Team W" | |
| Cui Xiangmeng | Uncertain | Member of "Team O" | |
| Liu Xinxi | Uncertain | Member of "Team E" | |
| Takehiro Yamamura | Takehiro Yamamura | Japanese | |
| Lu Ye | Uncertain | Member of "Team O" | |
| Duan Yingnan | Uncertain | Member of "Team W" | |
| General Guan | Zhao Yilong | Member of "Team W" | |
| Ren Yuhang | Uncertain | Member of "Team E" | |
| Xiong Zhiyu | Uncertain | Member of "Team E" | |

Female

| Ring name | Real name | Notes | Ref(s). |
|---|---|---|---|
| Mazzerati | Unknown | | |
| Zeda Zhang | Julia Ho | | |

Backstage personnel

| Ring name | Real name | Notes | Ref(s). |
|---|---|---|---|
| Skayde | Jorge Rivera Soriano | Trainer | |
| Michael Nee | Michael Nee | Vice president, commentator | |
