= Gleat =

Japanese professional wrestling and MMA promotion

- Founded: August 20, 2020
- Style: Puroresu; Shoot style Mixed martial arts
- Headquarters: Yūrakuchō, Tokyo, Japan
- Founder(s): Hiroyuki Suzuki; Kiyoshi Tamura
- Owner: Hiroyuki Suzuki
- Parent: Lidet Entertainment
- Website: ent.lidet.co.jp/gleat

Gleat (stylized in all caps as GLEAT and pronounced as "great") is a Japanese professional wrestling and mixed martial arts promotion founded in 2020 by former Pro Wrestling Noah parent company Lidet Entertainment after the acquisition of Noah and DDT Pro-Wrestling by CyberAgent. The promotion is overseen by Hiroyuki Suzuki and former mixed martial artist and professional wrestler Kiyoshi Tamura.

The promotion is divided into two primary wrestling brands: G Prowrestling, which features traditional puroresu, and Lidet UWF, which features UWFi-inspired shoot-style wrestling. In addition GLEAT MMA events features legitimate combat sports, including mixed martial arts, kickboxing, and submission grappling.

== History ==
In November 2018, Japanese advertising company Lidet Entertainment began investing in various business ventures in the professional wrestling industry including Riki Choshu's Power Hall show in December 2018. On January 29, 2019, Lidet Entertainment bought 75% shares of Pro Wrestling Noah, with the goal of transforming the promotion into the second largest promotion in Japan after New Japan Pro-Wrestling (NJPW). A year later due to Noah's financial struggles, Lidet Entertainment sold all shares of Pro Wrestling Noah to internet advertising company CyberAgent. Lidet's President Hiroyuki Suzuki wanting to continue to be involved with professional wrestling met with Kiyoshi Tamura several days after the sale of Noah. Suzuki later announced the formation of a new promotion, Gleat – it was additionally revealed that Kaz Hayashi and Nosawa Rongai would become the Gleat Chief Technical Officer and Chief Strategy Officer, respectively. Gleat promotes shows via its two sub-brands – G Prowrestling, a traditional puroresu brand, and Lidet UWF, a UWFi-inspired shoot style brand.

Gleat held its inaugural event, "Gleat Ver. 0", on October 15, 2020, which aired on Fighting TV Samurai on October 22, with the main event pitting NOAH's Sugiura-gun (Takashi Sugiura, Kazuyuki Fujita and Kendo Kashin) against Jun Akiyama, Shuhei Taniguchi, and Daisuke Sekimoto. The participation of NOAH wrestlers on Gleat events would cease after Nosawa Rongai resigned from his positions at Gleat to focus on his role as NOAH booker. Following the end of the NOAH partnership, Gleat would see the participation of wrestlers from other Japan-based wrestling promotions, such as Sho from NJPW and Shinjiro Otani and Masato Tanaka from Pro Wrestling Zero1.

In February 2021, shoot style veterans Minoru Tanaka and Daijiro Matsui were signed by the company, shortly after Tanaka was given the UWF Rule Technical Officer executive role. In May, it was announced that Cima, El Lindaman, T-Hawk, and Issei Onitsuka would be leaving Oriental Wrestling Entertainment and Ryuichi Kawakami would be leaving Big Japan Pro Wrestling to join Gleat. Gleat also operates a developmental division, with Yu Iizuka, Soma Watanabe, and Takanori Ito being the promotion's inaugural trainees.

In December 2021, Gleat announced a 12-man tournament would be held from January 26 to February 22, 2022 to crown the inaugural G-Rex Champion. The tournament and championship were won by El Lindaman.

In July 2022, Gleat announced the creation of the G-Infinity Championship for its G Prowrestling brand. A four-team tournament was held from August 20, 2022, to August 24 to crown the inaugural champions. The tournament was won by Bulk Orchestra (Kazma Sakamoto and Ryuichi Kawakami). On December 14, Gleat promoted its first mixed martial arts (MMA) event, Gleat MMA Ver. 0.

== Personnel ==
=== Background ===
Gleat divides their roster based on its two wrestling sub-brands, G Prowrestling and Lidet UWF. Gleat also recognizes a third roster division, Gleat MMA – wrestlers affiliated to Gleat MMA have legitimate martial arts experience and may wrestle on either G Prowrestling or Lidet UWF events.

- G – Wrestlers affiliated to G Prowrestling, Gleat's sub-brand that promotes matches using traditional professional wrestling rules.
- U – Wrestlers affiliated to Lidet UWF, Gleat's sub-brand that promotes matches using UWFi-inspired shoot style rules.
- M – Wrestlers that have legitimate mixed martial arts (MMA) experience or are affiliated to Gleat MMA, Gleat's sub-brand that promotes MMA fights.

=== Wrestlers ===
==== Contracted ====
Ring name	Real name	G	U	M	Unit	Notes
Brass Knuckles Jun	Jun Tonsho	Yes			Anti-Gle Monsters	
Check Shimatani	Nobuhiro Shimatani	Yes			Bulk Orchestra	
El Lindaman	Yuga Hayashi	Yes	Yes		#StrongHearts	
Go Miyake	Go Miyake	Yes			Gleat Main Unit	
Hayato Tamura	Hayato Tamura	Yes			Bulk Orchestra	
Issei Onitsuka	Issei Onitsuka	Yes			Yan's Family	
Junjie	Zhao Junjie	Yes			Gleat Main Unit	
Kaito Ishida	Kaito Ishida	Yes			Black Generation International	
Kazma Sakamoto	Unknown	Yes			Bulk Orchestra	
Kotaro Suzuki	Yasuhiro Suzuki	Yes			Black Generation International	
Michiko	Michiko Miyagi	Yes	Yes		Diamond Egoist	
Minoru Tanaka	Minoru Tanaka	Yes	Yes	Yes	Gleat Main Unit	UWF Rule Technical Officer
Ryo Aitaka	Ryo Aitaka	Yes	Yes		Gleat Main Unit	
Soma Watanabe	Soma Watanabe	Yes	Yes	Yes	Gleat Main Unit	G-Rush Champion; G-Infinity Champion
T-Hawk	Takuya Onodera	Yes			#StrongHearts	
Takanori Ito	Takanori Ito	Yes	Yes		Yan's Family	Lidet UWF World Champion
Takehiro Yamamura	Takehiro Yamamura	Yes			#StrongHearts	
Tetsuya Izuchi	Tetsuya Izuchi	Yes	Yes	Yes	Black Generation International	
Yu Iizuka	Yu Iizuka	Yes	Yes	Yes	Gleat Main Unit	

==== Regular outsiders ====
Ring name	Real name	Unit	Notes
Chris Vice	Unknown	Anti-Gle Monsters	Affiliated with Real Zero1
Hartley Jackson	Unknown	Black Generation International	Freelancer
Hideki "Shrek" Sekine	Hideki Sekine	Hard Hit	Freelancer
Hikaru Sato	Hikaru Sato	Hard Hit	Freelancer affiliated with Pancrase Mission
Katsuhiko Nakajima	Katsuhiko Nakajima	—N/a	Freelancer
Keiichi Sato	Keiichi Sato	Black Generation International	Freelancer
Kouki Iwasaki	Unknown	Bulk Orchestra	Freelancer
Masato Kamino	Masato Kamino	Yan's Family	Affiliated with Pro-Wrestling Basara
Oji Shiiba	Oji Shiiba	—N/a	Freelancer
Parker Boudreaux	Parker Boudreaux	—N/a	Freelancer
Quiet Storm	Unknown	Bulk Orchestra	Freelancer; G-Infinity Champion
Ryuichi Kawakami	Ryuichi Kawakami	Anti-Gle Monsters	Freelancer; G-Infinity Champion
Seiki Yoshioka	Seiki Yoshioka	#StrongHearts	Freelancer
Shigehiro Irie	Shigehiro Irie	#StrongHearts	Freelancer
Yusuke Kodama	Yusuke Kodama	Yan's Family	Freelancer
Yutani	Unknown	Black Generation International	Freelancer

=== Other personnel ===
Ring name	Real name	Notes
Chiho Tomiyama	Chiho Tomiyama	Ring announcer (G Prowrestling)
Haruo Murata	Haruo Murata	Commentator; Freelancer
Hiroyuki Suzuki	Hiroyuki Suzuki	Owner; President of Lidet
Katsumi Tamagawa	Katsumi Tamagawa	Referee (G Prowrestling)
Kaz Hayashi	Kazuhiro Hayashi	Chief Technical Officer
Kiyoshi Tamura	Kiyoshi Tamura	Executive Director; Commentator
Masato Yoshino	Masato Yoshino	Gleat Championship Belts Manager; G Prowrestling Commissioner
Riki Choshu	Mitsuo Yoshida	Observer
Ryogaku Wada	Ryogaku Wada	Referee (Lidet UWF)
Soft Imai	Daisuke Imai	Referee (G Prowrestling)
Takahiro Yoshimizu	Takahiro Yoshimizu	Ring announcer (Lidet UWF); Affiliated with Aoni Production
Takehiro Yamamura	Takehiro Yamamura	Ring announcer (G Prowrestling)
Yoshinori Umeki	Yoshinori Umeki	Referee (Lidet UWF); Affiliated with Pancrase
Yoshiro Yabu	Yoshiro Yabu	Ring announcer (G Prowrestling)

=== Notable alumni/guests ===
- Abdullah Kobayashi
- Akane Fujita
- Ami Miura
- Atsuki Aoyagi
- Bandido
- Chihiro Hashimoto
- Daijiro Matsui
- Daisuke Nakamura
- Daisuke Sekimoto
- Drew Parker
- Flamita
- Gringo Loco
- Hartley Jackson
- Jake Lee
- Janai Kai
- Josh Barnett
- Jun Akiyama
- Jun Masaoka
- Jun Tonsho
- Kazuyuki Fujita
- Kendo Kashin
- Koji Iwamoto
- Komander
- Kota Ibushi
- Kota Sekifuda
- Masakatsu Funaki
- Masato Kamino
- Masato Tanaka
- Maya Fukuda
- Mochi Miyagi
- Musashi
- Nosawa Rongai
- Seichi Ikemoto
- Shigehiro Irie
- Shinjiro Otani
- Sho
- Shuhei Taniguchi
- So Daimonji
- Syuri
- Takashi Sugiura
- Takuya Nomura
- Tomoaki Honma
- Thekla
- Tyson Maeguchi
- Van Vert Jack
- Yukari Hosokawa
- Yutaka Yoshie

== Championships ==
Championship	Current champion(s)	Reign	Date won	Days held	Location	Notes	Ref.
G-Rex Championship	Atsushi Kotoge	1	October 9, 2026	16+	Tokyo, Japan	Defeated El Lindaman at Gleat Ver. EX ~ Gleat Vs. Kyoteki 2026.	
G-Infinity Championship	Black Generation International (So Daimonji and Soma Watanabe)	1 (1, 1)	October 9, 2026	16+	Tokyo, Japan	Defeated G. Sharpe and TJP at Gleat Ver. EX ~ Gleat Vs. Kyoteki 2026.	
G-Rush Championship	Van Vert Jack	1	October 16, 2026	9+	Tokyo, Japan	Defeated Soma Watanabe at Gleat G Group Members Only Event.	
Lidet UWF World Championship	Takanori Ito	2	April 8, 2026	200+	Tokyo, Japan	Defeated Soma Watanabe to win the vacant title at Gleat Ver. 24.	

=== Lidet UWF World Championship ===
Lidet UWF World Championship
- Current design of the title (2023–present)

Details
- Promotion: Gleat
- Date established: April 2023
- Current champion: Takanori Ito
- Date won: April 8, 2026
Statistics
- First champion: Takanori Ito
- Most reigns: Takanori Ito (2 reigns)
- Longest reign: Katsuhiko Nakajima (615 days)
- Shortest reign: Takanori Ito (24 days)
- Oldest champion: Fujita "Jr." Hayato (36 years, 284 days)
- Youngest champion: Soma Watanabe (27 years, 120 days)
- Heaviest champion: Takanori Ito (209 lb (95 kg))
- Lightest champion: Fujita "Jr." Hayato (172 lb (78 kg))

The Lidet UWF World Championship (LIDET UWF世界王座, Ridetto UWF Sekai Ōza) is a professional wrestling championship owned and created by the Japanese company Lidet Entertainment and is currently disputed in the Gleat promotion. The main characteristic of the championship is that it can be defended and won only under UWF rules matches and in combat sports-based wrestling style bouts.

As of October 25, 2026, there have been a total of five reigns shared between four different champions and one vacancy. The current champion is Takanori Ito who is in his second reign.

Key
No.	Overall reign number
Reign	Reign number for the specific champion
Days	Number of days held
Defenses	Number of successful defenses
+	Current reign is changing daily

No.	Champion	Championship change			Reign statistics			Notes	Ref.
No.	Champion	Date	Event	Location	Reign	Days	Defenses	Notes	Ref.
1	Takanori Ito	June 7, 2023	Gleat Ver.EX "Face-Off" Access 2 TDCH	Tokyo, Japan	1	24	0	Defeated Shinya Aoki in a tournament final to become the inaugural champion.	
2	Fujita "Jr." Hayato	July 1, 2023	Gleat Ver.6: 2nd Anniversary Show	Tokyo, Japan	1	356	1		
—	Vacated	June 21, 2024	Michinoku 2024 Tokyo Conference Vol.1: Buryō Tōgen	Tokyo, Japan	—	—	—	Due to illness, Fujita "Jr." Hayato had been on a hiatus since his appearance at Wrestle Kingdom 18 on January 4, 2024. On June 21, at a Michinoku Pro Wrestling event, Fujita announced he was relinquishing both the Tohoku Junior Heavyweight and Lidet UWF World Championships.	
3	Katsuhiko Nakajima	July 1, 2024	Gleat Ver. 12	Tokyo, Japan	1	615	7	Defeated Takanori Ito to win the vacant title.	
4	Soma Watanabe	March 8, 2026	Gleat Lidet UWF Ver. 8	Tokyo, Japan	1	31	0		
5	Takanori Ito	April 8, 2026	Gleat Ver. 24	Tokyo, Japan	2	200+	3		

==== Combined reigns ====
As of October 25, 2026.

†	Indicates the current champion

Rank	Wrestler	No. of reigns	Combined defenses	Combined days
1	Katsuhiko Nakajima	1	7	615
2	Fujita "Jr." Hayato	1	1	356
3	Takanori Ito †	2	3	224+
4	Soma Watanabe	1	0	31

== Gleat events ==
Most Gleat events are separated into the three brands G Prowrestling, Lidet UWF and Gleat MMA. Numbered "Gleat Ver." events air bigger cards featuring a mix of the three brands. Specials events such as "Gleat Ver.EX", "Gleat Ver.Mega" and "Gleat Ver.&" are held in larger venues and usually feature wrestlers from other wrestling promotions such as All Japan Pro Wrestling (AJPW), Big Japan Pro Wrestling (BJW) or Pro Wrestling Freedoms. All events air live on Gleat's YouTube channel.

== See also ==
- Professional wrestling in Japan
