= Voodoo Murders =

Professional wrestling stable

Voodoo-Murders
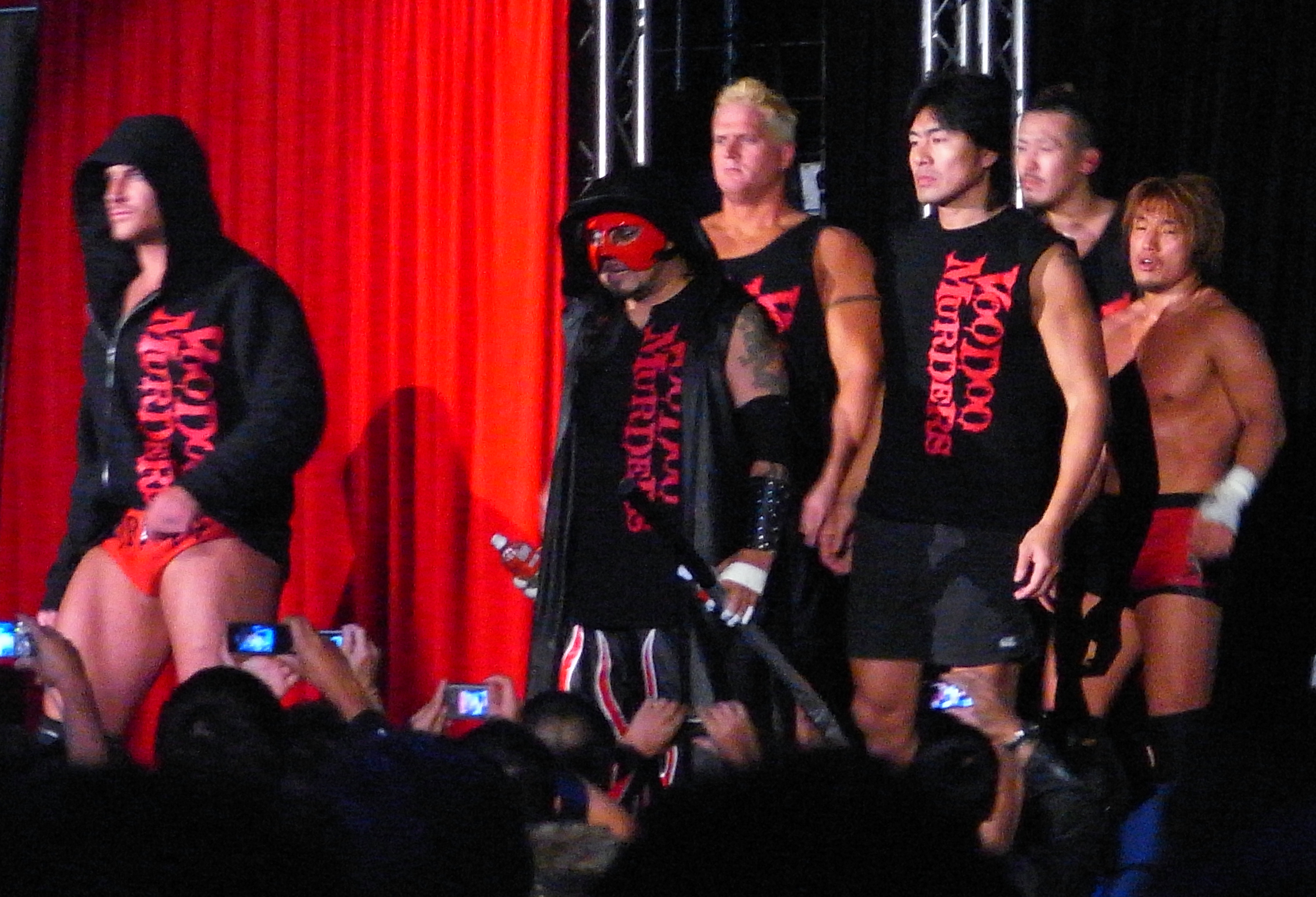
- Voodoo Murders in 2010

Stable
- Members: See below
- Debut: January 2, 2005
- Disbanded: March 30, 2024
- Years active: 2005–2011; 2013–2024

Voodoo Murders (stylised in all capital letters as VOODOO-MURDERS, also shortened as VDM) were a professional wrestling stable who were best known as the main heel group in All Japan Pro Wrestling between 2005 and 2011, and 2022 to 2023. In 2013, the group was reformed in Diamond Ring and later performed primarily for Pro Wrestling ZERO1 in the stable's final years. The group, famously led by former Toryumon wrestler Taru, performed violent actions in their matches and displayed a lack of respect for their opponents.

== History ==
=== 2005–2007 ===
After competing in All Japan Pro Wrestling briefly in the early 2000s, Taru returned to All Japan on January 3, 2005, teaming with Johnny Stamboli to defeat David Flair and Keiji Mutoh. The duo was later joined by Chuck Palumbo, Shuji Kondo, "brother" Yasshi and briefly Giant Bernard; proclaiming themselves as Voodoo Murders with Taru as their leader. Although the phrase Voodoo Murders is thought to be Engrish by some fans, it seems to be a tribute to a pulp magazine called "The Voodoo Murders." Taru drastically changed his yakuza inspired gimmick from Toryumon into a more bizarre, sinister cult leader of Voodoo-Murders. VDM would regularly employ illegal tactics and weapons into their matches, and often opted to lose via disqualification in order to beat down their opponents.

VDM quickly began feuding with the former top heel stable of All Japan RO&D which lasted for over a year. On June 19, Kondo and Yasshi won the vacant All Asia Tag Team Champions by defeating Tomoaki Honma and Katsuhiko Nakajima. Their title reign would be brief however, as they lost the titles to Nakajima and Kensuke Sasaki on July 26. Kondo bounced back quickly, winning the World Junior Heavyweight Championship from RO&D leader Taka Michinoku on October 22. On January 8, 2006, Taru unsuccessfully challenged Satoshi Kojima for the Triple Crown Heavyweight Championship. Following the match, Kohei Suwama aligned himself with VDM, changing his name to Suwama. Later in the year, RO'Z defected from RO&D to VDM. On September 17, VDM finally destroyed RO&D when Taru, Suwama, RO'Z and Yasshi defeated Buchanan, D'Lo Brown, Taiyō Kea and Michinoku after Buchanan and D'Lo Brown turned on RO&D and joined VDM.

At New Japan Pro-Wrestling's Wrestle Kingdom I, Taru, Suwama, RO'Z and former VDM member Giant Bernard defeated Manabu Nakanishi, Naofumi Yamamoto, Riki Choshu and Takashi Iizuka. On February 17, 2007, Kondo lost his World Junior Heavyweight Championship to Katsuhiko Nakajima. On June 24, after months of Taru attempting to recruit him, Satoshi Kojima finally joined the Voodoo Murders; following the main event match pitting Kondo against Nakajima, the group attacked Nakajima and Sasaki, but were aided when Kojima jumped off the turnbuckle and attacked Sasaki. The group continued to beat down Sasaki and everyone that attempted to help him, including Keiji Mutoh. On August 26, Suwama teamed up with Total Nonstop Action Wrestling star Scott Steiner in a losing effort to The Great Muta and Tajiri. At the same event, Taru and Kojima won the World Tag Team Championships from Taiyo Kea and Toshiaki Kawada. By the end of the year Zodiac had joined VDM, whilst Suwama was experiencing problems with the rest of the group.

=== 2008 ===
On January 3, 2008, Taru and Kojima lost the World Tag Team Championships to Keiji Mutoh and Joe Doering. At the same show, Suwama finally broke away from Voodoo Murders and returned the All Japan Seikigun. On March 1, Taru lost to Suwama whilst Kojima unsuccessfully challenged Kensuke Sasaki for the Triple Crown Championship. In the immediate aftermath, the group entered a slump as Kojima took time off due to injuries. The group also add Al Daivari and World Junior Heavyweight Champion Silver King. On April 29, Silver King lost his title to Ryuji Hijikata, and both new members leaving by the summer.

Things continued to get worse as Kojima returned from injury and decided to form his own stable with KAI and Hiroshi Yamato Later, Shuji Kondo also decided to leave the group and return to the All Japan Seikigun. Despite these setbacks, Taru would rebuild and in the fall, recruited top gaijin Joe Doering and veteran wrestler Nobukazu Hirai. Doering would team up with Zodiac as the Voodoo Towers, whilst Hirai was renamed to Hate.

=== 2009 ===
In February 2009, "brother" Yasshi left All Japan whilst Lance Hoyt, Michael Faith and former New Japan wrestler Minoru joined VDM. On March 1, Ryuji Hijikata turned on his partner Kaz Hayashi, joining VDM and returning to his masked persona Toshizo. In the spring, Minoru and Toshizo won the 2009 Junior Tag League and would go on and win the tournament, both also received shots at the Jr. Title against Kaz Hayashi but both failed to win the title. Throughout the year, there was dissension in the group as Zodiac was having issues with Taru. In September, Zodiac defected to Satoshi Kojima's F4 stable.

After Zodiac's departure, the group would have a slump for the rest of the year as they lost to F4 in a Captain's Fall Elimination Match on September 23, 2009, Taru and Doering then failed to win the All Asia Tag Team Championship on October 24, Hate failed to win the Jr. Heavyweight Title on October 25, and Taru and Doering placed last at the World's Strongest Tag Determination League due to Doering suffering from the flu.

=== 2010 ===
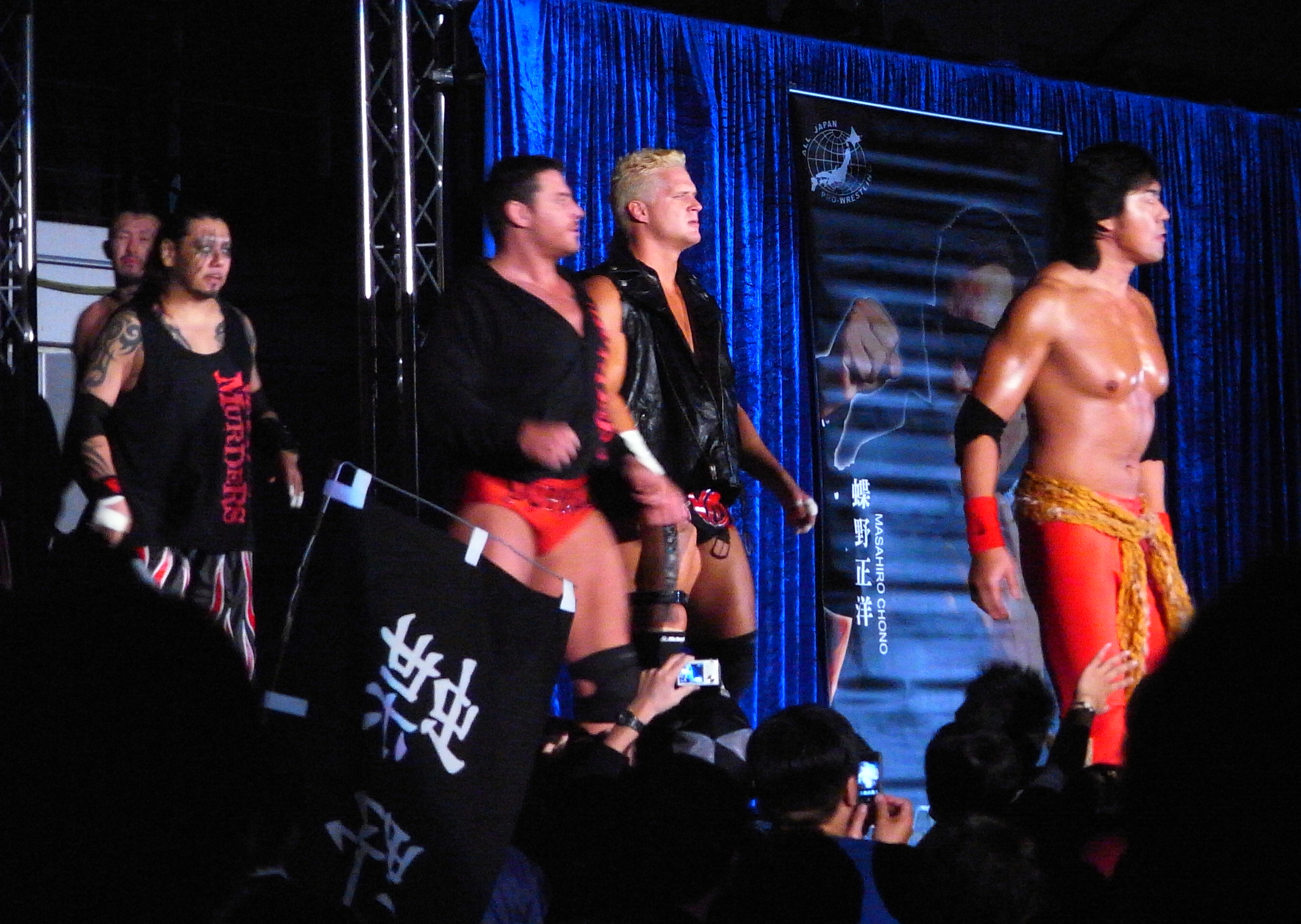
Voodoo Murders in 2010.

VDM's issues continued in 2010, with Doering leaving for the WWE. Despite the loss, VDM would go on to have one of its most successful years. They quickly replaced Doering with René Duprée and, on February 7, forced F4 to disband after defeating them in a Captain's Fall Elimination match. Continuing the success, VDM would recruit Big Daddy Voodoo and, on April 29, Taru teamed up with him to win the All Asia Tag Team Championships from Akebono and Ryota Hama. In the coming months, VDM also recruited Lance Cade, Mazada and Kenso. On August 13, tragedy struck when Lance Cade died at the age of 29 of apparent heart failure in San Antonio, Texas. Toshizo left All Japan in the same month. On August 29 Taru and Big Daddy Voodoo lost the All-Asia Tag Team Championship to Manabu Soya and Seiya Sanada. On October 10, 2010, Hate lost a match to Shuji Kondo and as a result he must retire. Later in the show, Charlie Haas debuted for All Japan and joined the Voodoo Murders. In his debut match, Haas teamed with Taru and Big Daddy Voodoo to defeat Minoru Suzuki, Akebono, & Taiyo Kea. Afterwards, Masayuki Kono joined the Voodoo Murders after Kenso helped him defeat Ryota Hama, changing his name to simply Kono On December 7 Kenso and Kono defeated Hama and Suwama in the finals to win the 2010 World's Strongest Tag Determination League.

=== 2011 ===
On January 2, 2011, Minoru defeated Kaz Hayashi to win the World Junior Heavyweight Championship, ending Hayashi's 23-month reign. At the same show, Hate returned to the group now known as Super Hate. The following day, Kenso and Kono challenged Akebono and Taiyo Kea for the World Tag Team Championship but lost. Following the January 3rd Korakuen Hall show, Taru fired Kenso from the group. On May 29, 2011, Nobukazu Hirai (Super Hate) suffered a stroke after a backstage fight with Taru. In the aftermath of the event, All Japan suspended not only Taru, but also Kono, Minoru and Mazada for not attempting to stop the assault, disbanded Voodoo Murders and vacated the titles the stable held.

=== 2013–2024 ===
After a nineteen-month break from professional wrestling, Taru returned to the ring on February 11, 2013, at a Diamond Ring event. His return match, where he and Kazunari Murakami faced Kento Miyahara and Taishi Takizawa, ended in a no contest, following run-ins from "brother" Yasshi and Kengo Nishimura. Afterwards, Taru, Murakami, Yasshi and Nishimura, reforming the Voodoo Murders, were defeated in an eight-man tag team match by Miyahara, Takizawa, Satoshi Kajiwara and Mitsuhiro Kitamiya. After the match, Miyahara and Takizawa turned on their partners and joined the new Voodoo Murders, with "brother" Yasshi positioned as the leader. Miyahara and the rest of Voodoo Murders announced an amicable split on November 14, 2013. Three days later, Yasshi, Nishimura and Taru made their debuts for Pro Wrestling Zero1, announcing that the Voodoo Murders were taking over the promotion. On February 11, 2014, Zero1 Vice President KAMIKAZE turned on the promotion and aligned his Daemon-gun stable, which also included Daemon Ueda and Takuya Sugawara, with the Voodoo Murders. On February 19 "brother" Yasshi formally announced that he is withdrawing from Voodoo Murders that he is more concentrated on wrestling Dragon Gate.

Voodoo Murders were officially disbanded on March 30, 2024. as a result of the departure of the Saito Brothers, Toshizo and Kono.

== Members ==
*	Founding member
I–III	Leader(s)

=== Final line-up ===
Member		Joined
Taru	* I	January 2, 2005–May 29, 2011; February 11, 2013–March 30, 2024
Toshizo		January 31, 2009–August 31, 2010; March 21, 2022–March 30, 2024
Kono		October 10, 2010–May 29, 2011; March 21, 2022–March 30, 2024
Jun Saito		October 2, 2022–March 30, 2024
Rei Saito		October 2, 2022–March 30, 2024

=== Former ===
Member		Left
"brother" Yasshi	*II	January 2, 2005–February 11, 2013; February 15, 2009–February 19, 2016
Kenso		August 15, 2010–January 3, 2011
Giant Bernard		March 20, 2005–December 5, 2005
Johnny Stamboli	*	January 2, 2005–September 30, 2005
Chuck Palumbo		February 8, 2005–February 8, 2006
Buchanan		September 17, 2005–January 7, 2007
D-Lo Brown		September 17, 2005–January 7, 2007
RO'Z		September 3, 2005–March 30, 2007
Satoshi Kojima		July 1, 2007–August 3, 2008
Zodiac		October 18, 2007–September 13, 2009
Silver King		October 18, 2007–June 13, 2008
Al Daivari		April 20, 2008–May 25, 2008
Super Hate		October 11, 2008–May 29, 2011
Lance Hoyt		February 6, 2009–February 15, 2009
Michael Faith		February 6, 2009–February 15, 2009
Lance Cade		May 16, 2010–July 4, 2010
René Duprée		August 7, 2010–May 29, 2011
Charlie Haas		October 10, 2010–October 24, 2010
Big Daddy Voodoo		July 4, 2010–May 29, 2011
Mazada		June 14, 2010–May 29, 2011
Kento Miyahara		February 11, 2013–November 14, 2013
Taishi Takizawa		February 11, 2013–June 20, 2013
Kengo		December 23, 2012–September 20, 2016
Kamikaze		March 15, 2015–June 8, 2018
James Raideen		April 30, 2017–August 13, 2017
Bob Sapp		May 12, 2017–May 12, 2017
Takuya Sugawara		April 9, 2014–October 26, 2018
Hartley Jackson		December 10, 2016–September 30, 2018
Masato Tanaka		March 2, 2017–February 16, 2019
Yuji Hino		December 12, 2017–February 16, 2019
Asuka		January 12, 2018–January 19, 2019
Shogun Okamoto		September 1, 2018–November 23, 2020
Chris Vice		March 4, 2018–January 1, 2023
Joe Doering		October 28, 2008–January 11, 2010; November 5, 2010–May 29, 2011
Yoshikazu Yokoyama		October 1, 2018–January 1, 2023
Shuji Kondo	*	January 2, 2005–September 29, 2008; March 21, 2022–April 8, 2022
Minoru		February 6, 2009–May 29, 2011; March 21, 2022–October 23, 2022
Suwama	III	January 8, 2006–January 3, 2008; March 21, 2022–May 29, 2023

== Championships and accomplishments ==
- Active Advance Pro Wrestling
  - 2AW Tag Team Championship (1 time) – Chris Vice and Yoshikazu Yokoyama
- All Japan Pro Wrestling
  - Triple Crown Heavyweight Championship (1 time) – Suwama
  - All Asia Tag Team Championship (3 times) – Taru and Big Daddy Voodoo (1), Shuji Kondo and "brother" Yasshi (1), and Minoru and Toshizo (1)
  - Gaora TV Championship (1 time) – Toshizo
  - World Junior Heavyweight Championship (3 times) – Shuji Kondo (1), Silver King (1), Minoru (1)
  - World Tag Team Championship (4 times) – Taru and Satoshi Kojima (1), Joe Doering and Kono (1), Kono & Suwama (1) and Jun & Rei Saito (1).
  - AJPW Junior Tag League (2009) – Minoru and Toshizo
  - January 2 Korakuen Hall Heavyweight Battle Royal (2009) – Zodiac
  - January 3 Korakuen Hall Junior Heavyweight Battle Royal (2006, 2007, 2009) – "brother" Yasshi
  - World's Strongest Tag Determination League (2010) – Kenso and Kono
- Chō Hanabi Puroresu
  - Bakuha-ō Championship (3 times, current) – Taru (2, current) and Masato Tanaka (1)
  - Bakuha-ō Tag Team Championship (1 time, current) – Taru & Masato Tanaka
- Gleat
  - G-Infinity Championship (1 time) – Jun Saito and Rei Saito
- Pro Wrestling Zero1
  - NWA Intercontinental Tag Team Championship (3 times) – Taru and Hartley Jackson (1), Masato Tanaka and Yuji Hino (1), & Taru and Chris Vice (1)
  - NWA International Lightweight Tag Team Championship (2 times) – Takuya Sugawara and "brother" Yasshi
  - NWA United National Heavyweight Championship (1 time) – Shogun Okamoto
  - Zero1 World Heavyweight Championship (4 times) – Masato Tanaka (2) and Chris Vice (2)
  - Tenkaichi Junior (2016) – Takuya Sugawara
  - Fire Festival (2017) – Masato Tanaka
- Tenryu Project
  - UWA World Junior Heavyweight Championship (1 time) – Kengo Nishimura
- Tokyo Sports

- Tag Team of the Year (2006) Taru, Suwama, Shuji Kondo and "brother" Yasshi
