= T-Hawk (wrestler) =

Japanese professional wrestler (born 1990)

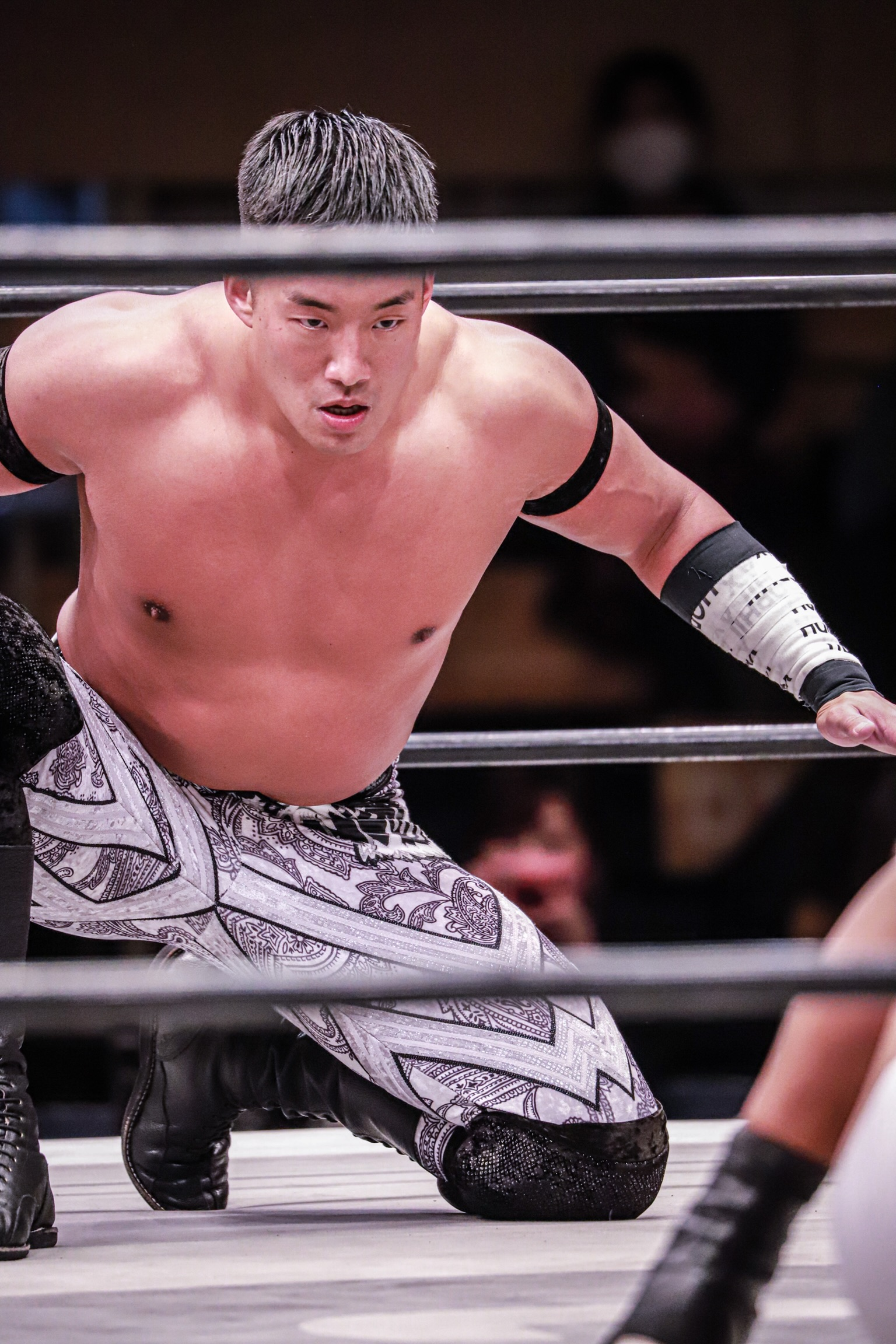
- Onodera in February 2022

Personal information
- Born: Takuya Onodera; April 30, 1990 (age 36) Tomakomai, Hokkaido

Professional wrestling career
- Ring names: Mr. Pii Pii Tomakomai Penguin; Naoki Tanizaki; Takuya Tomakomai; T-Hawk; Tomahawk; Tomahawk T.T.
- Billed height: 1.74 m (5 ft 8 1/2 in)
- Billed weight: 86 kg (190 lb)
- Debut: March 29, 2010

Takuya Onodera (小野寺卓也, Onodera Takuya; born April 30, 1990), best known by the ring name T-Hawk (shortened from Tomahawk T.T.), is a Japanese professional wrestler who currently works for Gleat, where he is a former one-time G-Rex Champion which he also has worked alongside Cima and El Lindaman; all three are now collective in the #StrongHearts stable in Gleat.. He is best known for competing in Dragon Gate and Oriental Wrestling Entertainment (OWE). He is also known for his work with Mexican promotion International Wrestling Revolution Group (IWRG).

== Professional wrestling career ==
=== Dragon Gate ===
==== Early career (2010–2011) ====
Onodera trained for his professional wrestling career at the NEX wrestling school, which is associated with the Japanese promotion Dragon Gate. Upon his professional wrestling debut on March 29, 2010 he adopted the ring name Takuya Tomakomai after his hometown. He lost his debut match to Dragon Gate veteran Super Shisa. Over the following months Tomakomai wrestled in low card matches, gaining ring experience as he developed his wrestling skills further. On September 16, 2010, Tomakomai made an appearance for New Japan Pro-Wrestling, teaming with Yohei Nakajima in a tag team match at NEVER.2, where they were defeated by Taichi and Tomoaki Honma. In 2011 he had built a reputation of being a promising wrestler who used a very powerful knife edge chop as his signature move. The reputation led to the Dragon Gate group "Junction Three" offering him a spot on their team.

==== Tomahawk T.T. (2011–2012) ====
The offer was turned down in favor of another Dragon Gate group called "Blood Warriors". Tomakomai changed his ring image and name, transforming himself into a face painted, silent "warrior" known as Tomahawk T.T. In his debut he teamed Gamma as the team lost to Shingo Takagi and Yamato. His refusal to join Junction Three led to a feud between the two factions that spanned several months until a 7-man team from Blood Warriors defeated a 7-man team of Junction Three forcing the losing group to disband per the match stipulation. His reputation for his knife edge chops was put on the line as Dragon Gate arranged a "King of Chop" tournament in April 2012. The tournament was decided by fan applause after each wrestler chopped their opponent once. Tomahawk T.T. advanced to the finals of the tournament but was defeated by Eita Kobayashi.

==== Naoki Tanizaki impersonation (2012–2013) ====
In January 2012, Naoki Tanizaki from Tomahawk's group had been sidelined with a shoulder injury. The injury led to Dragon Gate taking the Open the Triangle Gate Championship away from the group. A few weeks later, Tomahawk T.T. began working as "Naoki Tanizaki" (Note: Many English sources and databases incorrectly list this persona as "Naoki Tanisaki", spelled with an 's' instead of a 'z'.) (written as 谷崎なおき instead of 谷嵜なおき), adopting his moveset, attire and wearing fake tattoos to look more like the original. Blood Warriors claimed he was the real Naoki returning early from injury, but the slight change in spelling of the last name was used to indicate that Tanisaki was an impostor. In the early parts of 2012 the group changed its name from Blood Warriors to "Mad Blankey". Tanisaki and B×B Hulk won the Open the Twin Gate Championship on June 10, 2012, when they defeated Jimmyz (Jimmy Kagetora and Jimmy Susumu). Mad Blankey would only hold the championship for 7 days before losing them back to Jimmyz in a match that also included a team called Windows (K-Ness and Kenichiro Arai). When the original Tanizaki returned from his injury he started a feud with the impostor who "stole his name", joining the Jimmyz group. The Mad Blankey team of Tanisaki, B×B Hulk and Akira Tozawa competed in Dragon Gate's 2012 Summer Adventure Tag League, which they won by defeating the teams of Jimmyz (Genki Horiguchi H.A.Gee.Mee, Naoki Tanizaki and Ryo "Jimmy" Saito), Windows (Kenichiro Arai, Super Shisa and Syachihoko Boy) and finally Kaettekita Veteran-gun (Don Fujii, Dragon Kid and Masaaki Mochizuki). With their victory, Mad Blankey also won the Open the Triangle Gate Championship.

On September 23, 2013, Mad Blankey defended the Open the Triangle Gate Championship against the Jimmyz Group of Horiguci, Saito and Tanizaki, with the added stipulation that if Mad Blankey won the match they would also win the rights to the "Naoki Tanizaki" name. Mad Blankey won the match and thus the rights to the name. After the match, the defeated former-Tanizaki wanted to rename himself to Naoki Jimmy, but the victorious Tanisaki claimed the right to choose Tanizaki's new name. Saying that Tanizaki's whining and crying reminded him of the "kyu kyu" noise a dolphin makes, he renamed Tanizaki to Mr. Kyu Kyu Toyonaka Dolphin. On October 21, 2013, Mad Blankey lost the Triangle Gate championship to the team of Gamma, Hub and Magnitude Kishiwada. The feud between the current and the former Naoki Tanizaki saw "Mr. Kyu Kyu Toyonaka Dolphin" win the 2013 New Year Dragon Scramble match over, among others, Naoki Tanisaki. A few weeks later the two faced off in a "loser leaves town" match, which initially saw Tanisaki win, only to have an immediate rematch take place with the same stipulation, won by Yoyonaka Dolphin, negating the results of the earlier match and giving Naoki Tanizaki the rights back to his name. He also renamed the fake Tanisaki "Mr. Pii Pii Tomakomai Penguin". The rivalry culminated on February 11, when the Jimmyz defeated Mad Blankey in a five-on-five elimination tag team match, as a result of which Penguin was exiled from Dragon Gate. After the match, Tanizaki shook hands with Penguin and offered to team with him in the future. Tanizaki then also fought off Mad Blankey, when they turned on Penguin for losing the match. On February 15, Penguin teamed with Tanizaki, who worked as "Mr. Kyu Kyu Naoki Tanizaki Toyonaka Dolphin", in a tag team match, where the two lost to Akira Tozawa and B×B Hulk.

==== Mexican excursion (2013) ====
Following one last match in Dragon Gate he traveled to Mexico to work for Dragon Gate's affiliated promotion International Wrestling Revolution Group (IWRG), working as "Tomahawk". Tomahawk joined fellow young Dragon Gate wrestler Eita who had been on an extended training stay since mid-2012. It was not announced how long Tomahawk would remain in Mexico. His first match was on February 28, 2013, where he, Eita and Apolo Estrada, Jr. defeated Black Terry, Chico Che and Freelance. Less than three weeks later he worked his first major IWRG show as he competed on undercard of the 2013 Prison Fatal show, teaming with Apolo Estrada, Jr. and Black Terry as the team lost to Veneno, Chico Che and Golden Magic.

==== T-Hawk (2013–2018) ====
On July 21, 2013, Onodera, now billed as "T-Hawk", Eita and U-T, forming a new stable named Millennials, announced their impending return to Dragon Gate. The stable made its debut appearance on August 23 at The Gate of Generation. During September, T-Hawk and Eita won the 2013 Summer Adventure Tag League, defeating B×B Hulk and Yamato in the finals on September 28 to become the interim Open the Twin Gate Champions. On November 3, T-Hawk and Eita defeated previous champions, Dragon Kid and K-ness, to become the official Open the Twin Gate Champions. On December 5, T-Hawk, Eita and one of Millennials' newest members, Mexican wrestler Flamita, defeated Mad Blankey (B×B Hulk, Cyber Kong and Yamato) to win the Open the Triangle Gate Championship. However, just three days later, T-Hawk and Eita lost the Open the Twin Gate Championship to Naruki Doi and Yamato. On December 22, Millennials lost the Open the Triangle Gate Championship to the Jimmyz (Jimmy Susumu, Mr. Kyu Kyu Naoki Tanizaki Toyonaka Dolphin and Ryo "Jimmy" Saito) a three-way elimination match, which also included Oretachi Veteran-gun (Cima, Dragon Kid and Masaaki Mochizuki). On March 16, 2014, T-Hawk, Eita and U-T defeated the Jimmyz (Jimmy Kanda, Jimmy Susumu and Mr. Kyu Kyu Naoki Tanizaki Toyonaka Dolphin) to win the Open the Triangle Gate Championship. They lost the title to Mad Blankey (Cyber Kong, Kzy and Naruki Doi) on June 14. On July 20, T-Hawk and Eita defeated Akira Tozawa and Shingo Takagi to win the Open the Twin Gate Championship. They lost the title to Cima and Gamma on November 2, before regaining it on December 3. On December 28, they lost the title to Cyber Kong and Yamato. On August 6, 2015, Millennials lost a three-way match and were as a result forced to disband. Afterwards, T-Hawk began feuding with former stablemates Eita and Kotoka, who blamed him for the dissolution of the Millennials. On September 23, 2015, T-Hawk joined Monster Express after turning down an invitation to join Dia.Hearts. On March 6, he and Big R Shimizu defeated Naruki Doi and Yamato to win the Open the Twin Gate Championship. They'd lose the titles to Jimmy Susumu and Jimmy Kagetora on June 19.

After a month of tension between T-Hawk and the rest of his Monster Express stablemates, he would leave the unit to join Verserk on September 25. On June 11, 2017, T-Hawk defeated Naruki Doi in the final to win the 2017 King of Gate tournament. He would receive his Open the Dream Gate Championship title shot on July 23 at "Kobe Pro Wrestling Festival 2017", but was defeated by Yamato.

On September 18, 2017, at Dangerous Gate, Verserk defeated Jimmyz in a five-on-five no disqualification elimination match where the losing unit would be forced to disband. T-Hawk was the only survivor, having eliminated the final three opponents: Genki Horiguchi, Ryo Saito and Jimmy Susumu. It marked the beginning of the end of the five-year existence of the Jimmyz, who were granted a farewell tour until October.

=== Oriental Wrestling Entertainment (2018–2021) ===
In early 2018, Cima announced his departure from Dragon Gate after 21 years working for the promotion, and also announced the formation of a new promotion, Oriental Wrestling Entertainment (OWE), to be primarily based in China. As well as Cima, T-Hawk, El Lindaman and Takehiro Yamamura also left Dragon Gate to join OWE. OWE's inaugural event was held on May 7. On June 22, representing OWE, T-Hawk debuted in Wrestle-1. The rest of the OWE roster soon debuted in the promotion too, and named themselves "Strong Hearts", later recruiting Dezmond Xavier and Zachary Wentz to the group. Strong Hearts also debuted for DDT Pro Wrestling in September, defeating All Out (Konosuke Takeshita, Akito (wrestler), Shunma Katsumata and Yuki Iino. Representing Strong Hearts he won the Wrestle-1 Championship on January 5, 2019, defeating Shotaro Ashino.

== Championships and accomplishments ==
- All Japan Pro Wrestling

- All Asia Tag Team Championship (1 time) – with El Lindaman
- Six-Man Tag Team Tournament (2022) – with Shigehiro Irie and Issei Onitsuka

- Australasian Wrestling Federation

- Australasian Championship (1 time)

- DDT Pro-Wrestling

- KO-D 6-Man Tag Team Championship (2 times) – with Cima and Duan Yingnan (1) and Tetsuya Endo and El Lindaman (1)

- Desastre Total Ultraviolento

- DTU Alto Impacto Championship (1 time)

- Dragon Gate

- Open the Triangle Gate Championship (5 times) – with B×B Hulk and Akira Tozawa (1), Eita and Flamita (1), Eita and U-T (1), Masato Yoshino and Akira Tozawa (1), Shingo Takagi and Cyber Kong (1)
- Open the Twin Gate Championship (6 times) – with B×B Hulk (1), Eita (4) and Big R Shimizu (1)
- Interim Open the Twin Gate Championship (1 time) – with Eita
- King of Gate (2017)
- New Year's Unit 6-Man Tag 1 Day Tournament (2017) – with El Lindaman and Shingo Takagi
- Open the Triangle Gate Championship Next Challenger Team One Night Tournament (2013) – with Eita and Flamita
- Summer Adventure Tag League (2012) – with B×B Hulk and Akira Tozawa
- Summer Adventure Tag League (2013) – with Eita

- Gleat

- G-Rex Championship (1 time)
- Interim G-Infinity Championship (1 time) – with Shigehiro Irie
- One Day Tag Tournament Gotanda Cup (2025) – with Ryo Aitaka
- G-Class Tournament (2026)

- Pro Wrestling Illustrated

- Ranked No. 98 of the top 500 singles wrestlers in the PWI 500 in 2023

- Wrestle-1

- Wrestle-1 Championship (1 time)
- Wrestle-1 Tag League (2019) – with Shigehiro Irie

=== Lucha de Apuesta record ===
Winner (wager)	Loser (wager)	Location	Event	Date	Notes
T-Hawk (hair)	Cima (hair)	Nagoya, Japan	Dead or Alive 2015	May 5, 2015	(Note: Steel cage match, which also included Kzy, Ryo "Jimmy" Saito, Shingo Takagi and Yamato.)
