= Shigehiro Irie =

Japanese professional wrestler

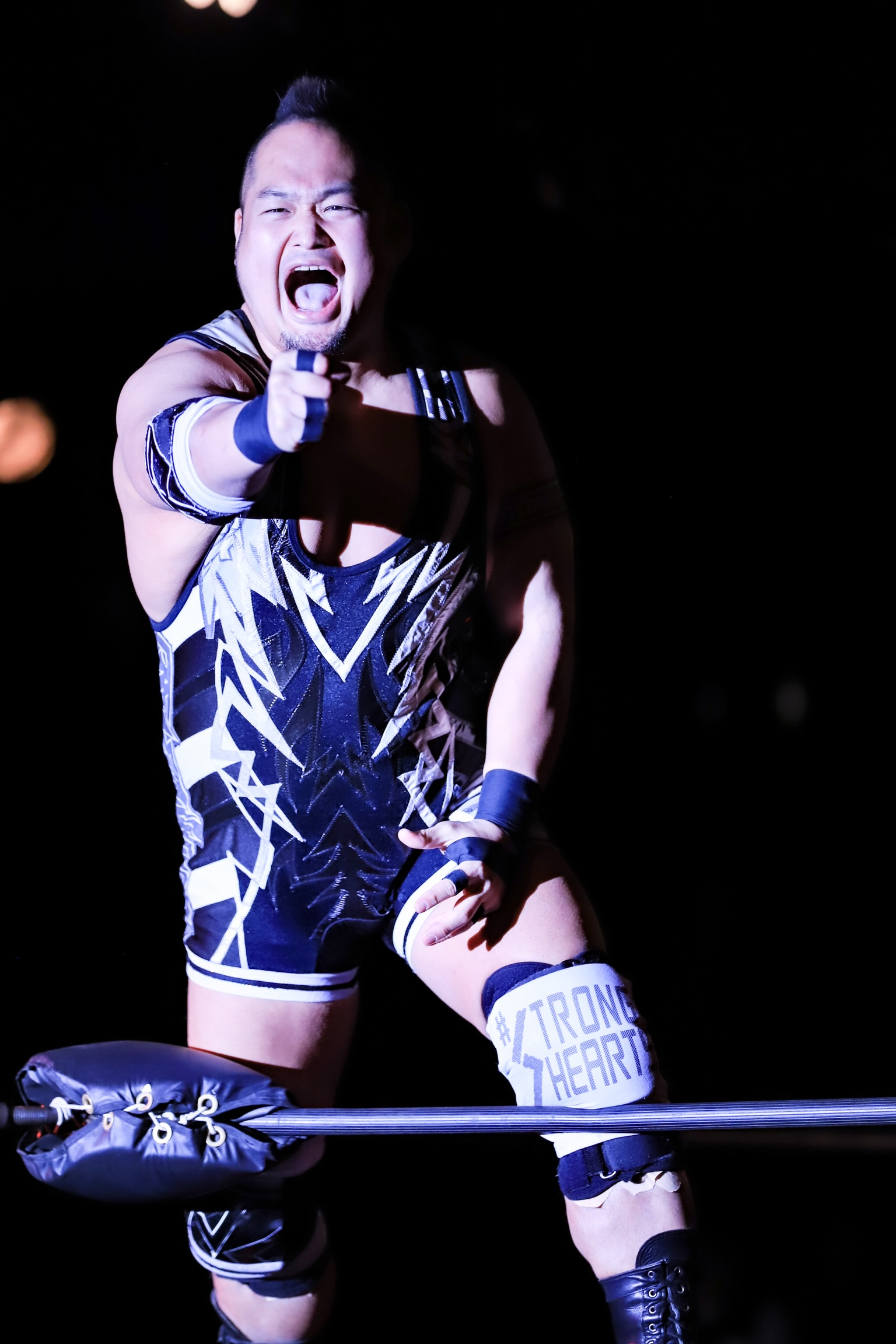
- Irie in February 2023

Personal information
- Born: Shigehiro Irie (入江 茂弘, Irie Shigehiro); March 28, 1988 (age 38) Osaka, Osaka, Japan

Professional wrestling career
- Ring name(s): Shigehiro Irie; Shigeko Deluxe
- Billed height: 1.73 m (5 ft 8 in)
- Billed weight: 115 kg (254 lb)
- Trained by: Osaka Pro Wrestling; Billyken Kid; Kengo Takai; Super Demekinra; Dera Pro Wrestling
- Debut: April 30, 2008

Shigehiro Irie (入江 茂弘, Irie Shigehiro; born March 28, 1988) is a Japanese professional wrestler and former mixed martial artist best known for his work in DDT Pro-Wrestling (DDT). Irie has also competed for All Japan Pro Wrestling (AJPW), Big Japan Pro Wrestling (BJW), and a number of North American independent promotions in the past.

== Early life ==
Irie was born in Osaka. He began his initial pro wrestling training in 2002 at the age of 15, training alongside Atsushi Kotoge with Osaka Pro Wrestling (OPW). Irie eventually decided to pursue MMA, competing in a number of amateur fights, including some in Pancrase. Irie resumed training in 2007 with Dera Pro Wrestling in Nagoya and made his debut in April 2008 against Shota Takanashi.

== Professional wrestling career ==
=== DDT Pro Wrestling (2008–2018) ===
Beginning in May 2008, Irie began sporadically appearing for DDT Pro-Wrestling (DDT), primarily teaming with other rookies against established wrestlers. In August 2010, Irie defeated Soma Takao to win a special one day tournament. DDT owner Sanshiro Takagi became a fan of Irie after watching him compete and offered him more regular bookings with DDT as a result.

Representing DDT, Irie debuted for New Japan Pro-Wrestling (NJPW) in 2011, teaming with fellow DDT rookie Keisuke Ishii in a loss to NJPW's Tomoaki Honma and freelancer Tsuyoshi Kikuchi. Irie began to achieve more success in 2011, beginning on May 21 when he defeated established DDT veteran Kota Ibushi, eliminating him from the 2011 King of DDT tournament. The next month, Irie formed a tag team with Munenori Sawa, and the duo defeated Gentaro and Yasu Urano to win the KO-D Tag Team Championship, but lost the titles just days later to Kenny Omega and Michael Nakazawa. Irie participated in a falls count anywhere match the following month, teaming up with Takagi and SeXXXy Eddy in a loss to Omega, Ibushi and Nakazawa. On October 10, Irie captured the KO-D Tag Team Championship once again, this time teaming with Keisuke Ishii to defeat Makoto Oishi and Danshoku Dino. They dropped the championship to Urano and Yuji Hino on December 31 and unsuccessfully challenged them in a rematch on February 11.

On April 1, 2012, Irie unsuccessfully challenged All Japan Pro Wrestling (AJPW) competitor Kenny Omega for the World Junior Heavyweight Championship. On May 4 at a Union Pro Wrestling event, Irie teamed up with Shuji Ishikawa to capture the BJW Tag Team Championship, defeating Shinobu and Yoshihito Sasaki. They dropped the titles to Shinobu and Yuji Okabayashi on July 15. Irie and Ishii teamed up with Soma Takao as Team Dream Futures to enter the tournament for the vacant KO-D 6 Man Tag Team Championship and captured the titles by defeating Oishi, Akito and Takagi in the final on January 12. The trio lost the championship to Monster Army (Yuji Hino, Antonio Honda and Daisuke Sasaki) on January 27. Irie won the right to challenge for the KO-D Openweight Championship on February 24 and defeated Kenny Omega on March 20 to win the championship for the first time. He lost the championship to Harashima on August 18. On January 26, 2014, Irie unsuccessfully challenged Harashima in a rematch for the championship. Irie, Ishii and Soma Takao successfully captured the KO-D 6 Man Championship once again in February 2014, defeating Aja Kong, Danshoku Dino and Makoto Oishi, but dropped them to Ibushi, Omega and Sasaki in April.

Im August 2014, Irie, Ishii and Takao captured the KO-D 6 Man Tag Team Championship once again, defeating Shuten-dōji (Yukio Sakaguchi, Masa Takanashi and Kudo). They dropped the championship to T2Hii (Takagi, Toru Owashi and Kazuki Hirata) on September 28. On March 1, 2015, Irie, Ishii and Takao defeated Shuten-dōji to once again become KO-D 6 Man Champions, but dropped the championship back to them in their first defence. Team Dream Futures defeated Shuten-dōji on April 11 to regain the championship and successfully defended them until September when they lost to #OhkaTeikoku (Ken Ohka, Danshoku Dino and Super Sasadango Machine). Team Dream Futures once again captured the KO-D 6 Man Championship in May, defeating Kazusada Higuchi, Kouki Iwasaki and Shunma Katsumata. In his farewell match, Irie teamed with Yukio Sakaguchi to defeat Harashima and Keisuke Ishii.

In April 2018, Irie defeated Konosuke Takeshita to once again become KO-D Openweight Champion. Irie would lose the championship to Sami Callihan on August 1, 2018. On September 25, 2018, Irie announced his departure from DDT.

=== International promotions (2016–present) ===
Irie debuted in the United States on July 24 for GALLI Lucha Libre (GALLI), unsuccessfully challenging Marshe Rockett for the GALLI Junior Heavyweight Championship. Irie again competed for GALLI on July 29, teaming with Gringo Loco and Skayde Jr. to defeat Zema Ion, GPA and Matt Knicks. Irie debuted for Independent Wrestling Association Mid-South (IWA Mid-South) on August 4, losing to Reed Bentley. Two days later he debuted for Hoosier Pro Wrestling (HPW), defeating JKO. He wrestled his final match before returning to Japan on September 6 for IWA Mid-South, losing to Chris Hero in a triple threat match also featuring Kongo Kong. Irie has also competed in various other American indy promotions including WCWO, AAW, Pro Wrestling Blitz, Freelance Wrestling, Resistance Pro Wrestling, MIAW, UPW, AIW, Global Force Wrestling, AWS, and Championship Wrestling from Hollywood. Irie defeated Silas Young to become the new MIAW Heavyweight Champion on September 6 in Milwaukee. Irie also won the WCWO Young Guns Tournament featuring the top 12 prospects of the mid-west area held on October 5, 2016 in Indianapolis.

Irie returned to the west on January 10, debuting for Canada-based Canadian Wrestling's Elite (CWE) defeating Jacob Creed.

Irie made his UK debut for Progress, challenging Walter at Chapter 81 for the Progress World Championship. In 2019, he also challenged Zack Sabre Jr for the British Heavyweight championship in Revolution Pro Wrestling, and Lionheart for the ICW World Heavyweight championship in Insane Championship Wrestling.

Irie won UK's SOUTHSIDE WRESTLING's World Heavyweight Championship from Rob Lynch on 3 March 2019 in St. Neots. Irie participated in wXw promotion's "Ambition 10" tournament in Oberhausen, Germany on 9 March. Irie defeated Laurance Roman in 1st round, Chris Ridgeway in semi-final, then Rico Bushido in the final.

Irie has appeared in 5 shows during 2019 Mania Week in NY.

In 2023, at WXW 16 CARAT GOLD finals, Irie defeated Axel Tischer, to become wXw Unified World Wrestling Champion.

== Championships and accomplishments ==
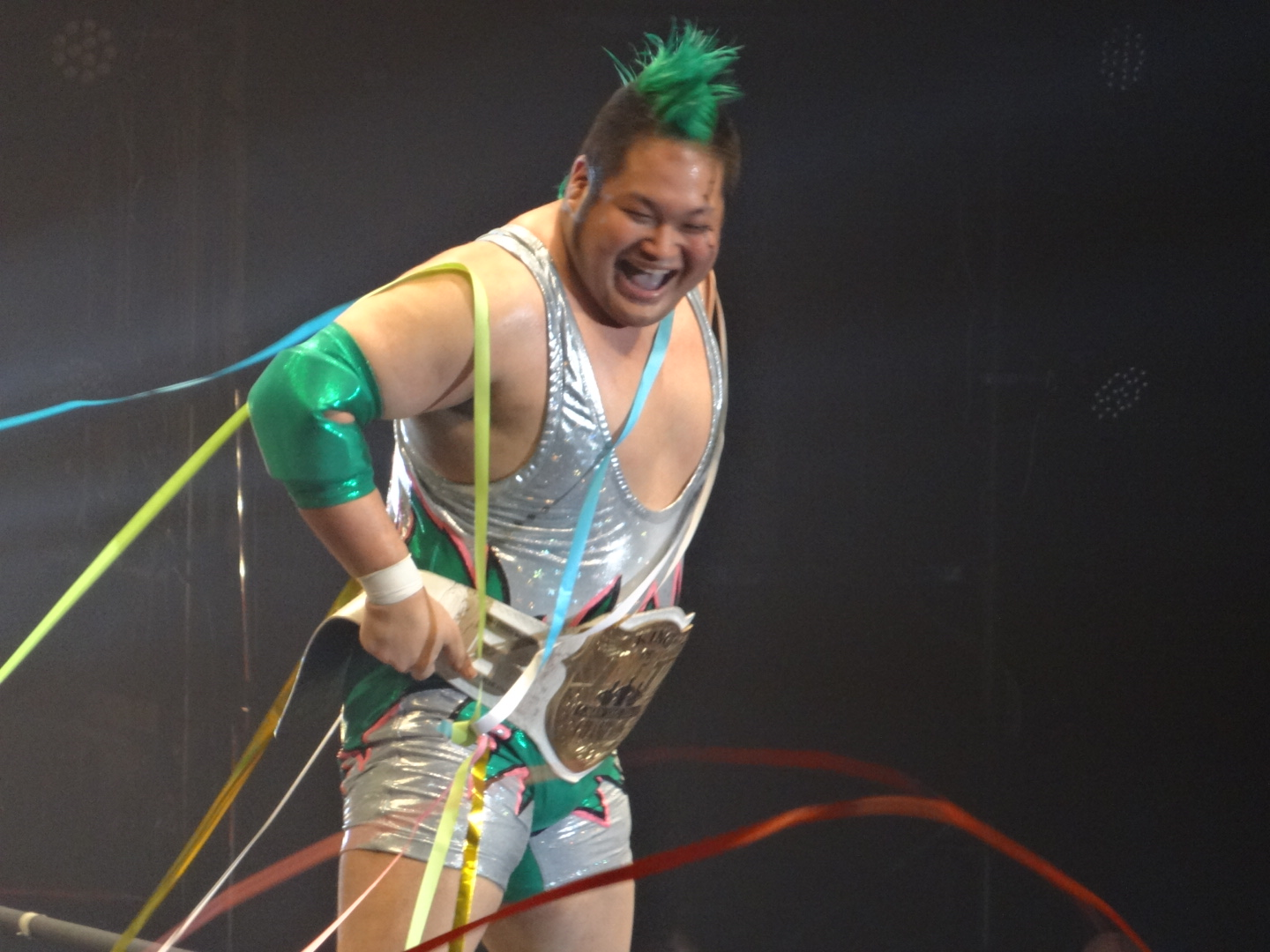
Irie as one third of the KO-D Six Man Tag Team Champions in 2014

- Active Advance Pro Wrestling

- 2AW Openweight Championship (1 time)
- 2AW Tag Team Championship (1 time) – with The Andrew Takuma

- All Japan Pro Wrestling

- Gaora TV Championship (1 time)
- All Asia Tag Team Championship (1 time) – with Keisuke Ishii
- Six-Man Tag Team Tournament (2022) – with Issei Onitsuka and T-Hawk

- Big Japan Pro Wrestling

- BJW Tag Team Championship (1 time) – with Shuji Ishikawa
- Saikyo Tag League (2019) – with Yuji Okabayashi

- DDT Pro-Wrestling

- KO-D Openweight Championship (3 times)
- Ironman Heavymetalweight Championship (2 times)
- KO-D 6-Man Tag Team Championship (6 times) – with Keisuke Ishii and Soma Takao (6)
- KO-D Tag Team Championship (3 times) – with Munenori Sawa (1), Keisuke Ishii (1) and Kazusada Higuchi (1)
- Hardcore Mixed Tag 1 Day Tournament (2022) – with Itsuki Aoki

- Pro Wrestling Team Dera

- Team Dera Drazeger Championship (1 time, current)

- Gleat

- Interim G-Infinity Championship (1 time) – with T-Hawk

- Ganbare☆Pro-Wrestling

- Spirit of Ganbare World Tag Team Championship (1 time) – with Mizuki Watase

- Midwest Independent Association of Wrestling

- MIAW Heavyweight Championship (2 times)

- Michinoku Pro Wrestling
  - Tohoku Tag Team Championship (1 time, current) – with Marukan Softman as Mask de Coppe

- PWLL Championship (2 time)

- Osaka Pro Wrestling

- OPW Tag Team Championship (1 time) – with Quiet Storm

- Oriental Wrestling Entertainment

- OWE Openweight Championship (1 time)

- PUZZLE

- Top of PUZZLE Championship (1 time)

- Pro Wrestling Illustrated
  - Ranked No. 200 of the top 500 singles wrestlers in the PWI 500 in 2024
- Ryukyu Dragon Pro Wrestling

- Sou Ryuo Tag Team Championship (1 time) – with Kazuaki Mihara

- Sportiva Entertainment

- Sportiva Tag League (2010) – with Mammoth Handa

- Southside Wrestling Entertainment

- SWE World Heavyweight Championship (1 time)

- Tenryu Project

- Tenryu Project World 6-Man Tag Team Championship (1 time) – with Kouki Iwasaki and Koji Iwamoto

- VKF Pro Wrestling

- VKF King Of Wrestle Naniwa Championship (1 time)

- Wrestle-1

- Wrestle-1 Tag League (2019) – with T-Hawk

- Wild Championship Wrestling Outlaws

- WCWO Young Guns Tournament (2016)

- World Series Wrestling

- WSW Australian Championship (1 time)

- Westside Xtreme Wrestling

- wXw Unified World Wrestling Championship (1 time)
- 16 Carat Gold Tournament (2023)
- Ambition 10 (2019)
