= Hayato Tamura =

Japanese professional wrestler (born 1995)

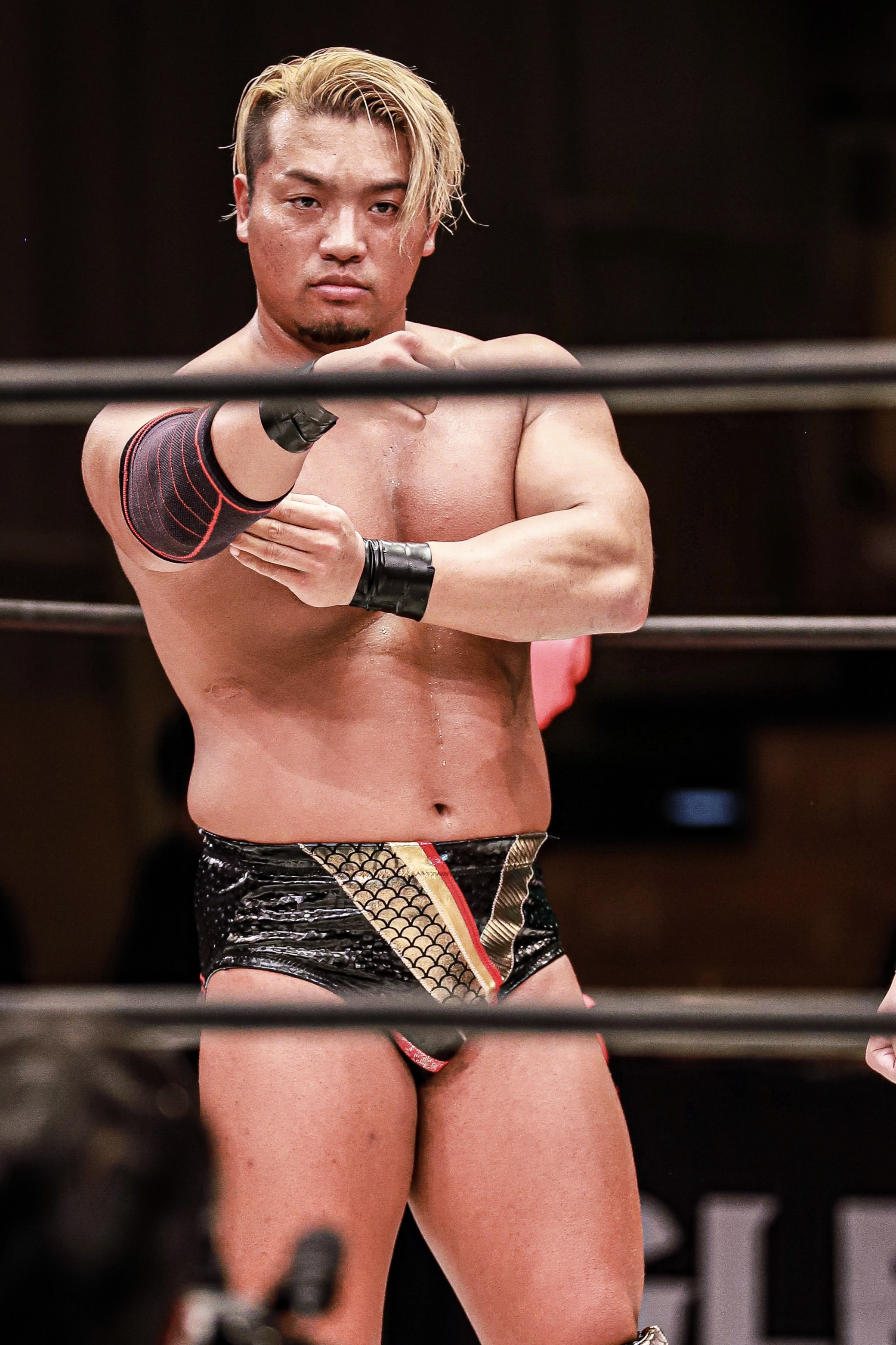
- Tamura in August 2023

Personal information
- Born: September 13, 1995 (age 30) Minakami, Japan

Professional wrestling career
- Ring name: Hayato Tamura
- Billed height: 178 cm (5 ft 10 in)
- Billed weight: 103 kg (227 lb)
- Trained by: Taka Michinoku
- Debut: 2019

Hayato Tamura (田村 駿人, Tamura Hayato; ring name: 田村 ハヤト) (born September 13, 1995) is a Japanese professional wrestler working for Gleat, where he is the former longest reign one-time G-Rex Champion. He is best known for his time in Pro Wrestling Zero1, where he is a former World Heavyweight Championship (Zero1).

== Professional wrestling career ==
=== Independent circuit (2019–present) ===
Tamura made his professional wrestling debut at JTO Yume, an event promoted by Professional Wrestling Just Tap Out at September 24, 2019, where he fell short to his coach Taka Michinoku. At YPW Kubota Brothers Produce ~ We Can Do It!!, an event promoted by Yanagase Pro Wrestling on November 15, 2020, he teamed up with Arata to defeat Jade and Shogun Okamoto.

==== Pro Wrestling Zero1 (2020–2021) ====
Tamura made his debut in Pro Wrestling Zero1 on August 27, 2020, at ZERO1 New ZERO1 where he defeated Chris Vice to win the World Heavyweight Championship. At BJW/ZERO1 Clash, a cross-over event promoted by Zero1 in partnership with Big Japan Pro Wrestling on December 4, 2020, Tamura teamed up with Yuji Okabayashi to pick up a victory over Hideyoshi Kamitani and Takuho Kato. At BJW/ZERO1/2AW Big Clas, a cross-over event produced by Zero1 in partnership with Big Japan Pro Wrestling and Active Advance Pro Wrestling on April 7, 2021, Tamura teamed up with Ayato Yoshida and Daichi Hashimoto in a losing effort to Daisuke Sekimoto, Kengo Mashimo and Masato Tanaka as a result of a six-man tag team match. At ZERO1 20th Anniversary Series on May 4, 2021, Tamura teamed up with Masato Tanaka in a losing effort to Cima and Daisuke Sekimoto.

He is known for competing in the promotion's signature events such as the Fire Festival, making his only appearance at the 2020 edition where he won the Block B with a total of twenty-two points after competing against Chris Vice, Masato Tanaka, Yuko Miyamoto, Tsugutaka Sato, Shogun Okamoto and Takafumi, but fell short to Hartley Jackson in the finals from November 1. As for the Furinkazan tournament, Tamura participated in a side match at the 2020 edition, where he teamed up with Kanon and Ren Ayabe in a losing effort to Asuka and Revengers (Masato Tanaka and Takuya Sugawara).

==== Gleat (2021–present) ====
Tamura made his debut in the Gleat promotion on July 1, 2021, at GLEAT Ver. 1 where he fell short to El Lindaman.

== Championships and accomplishments ==
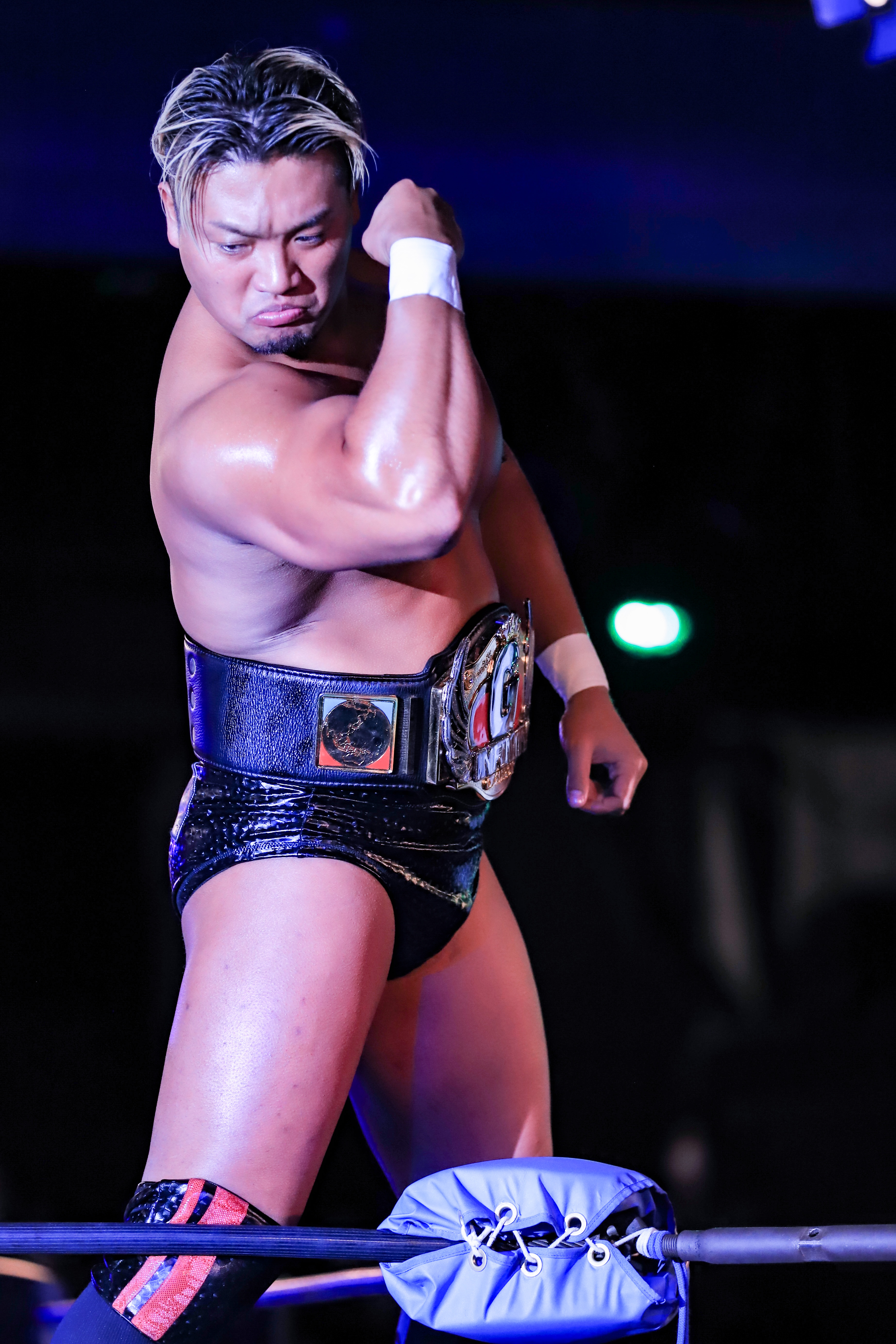
Tamura is a one-time G-Infinity Champion alongside Check Shimatani.

- Gleat
  - G-Rex Championship (1 time)
  - G-Infinity Championship (1 time) – with Check Shimatani
- Pro Wrestling Illustrated
  - Ranked No. 152 of the top 500 singles wrestlers in the PWI 500 in 2022
- Pro Wrestling Zero1
  - World Heavyweight Championship (1 time)
- Pro Wrestling Up Town
  - Up Town Championship (1 time)
