= Wrestle Sekigahara =

2022 Ganbare Pro-Wrestling event

- Promotional poster featuring every participating wrestler
- Promotion: CyberFight
- Brand: GanPro
- Date: July 10, 2022
- City: Tokyo, Japan
- Venue: Ota City General Gymnasium
- Attendance: 804
- Tagline: Get hot with pro-wrestling! (Note: Get hot with pro-wrestling! (Japanese: プロレスで熱くなれ!, Hepburn: Puroresu de atsuku nare!))

Wrestle Sekigahara chronology
← Previous; First	Next → 2023

Wrestle Sekigahara was a professional wrestling event promoted by CyberFight's sub-brand Ganbare☆Pro-Wrestling (GanPro). It took place on July 10, 2022, in Tokyo, Japan, at the Ota City General Gymnasium. The event aired live on CyberAgent's streaming service Wrestle Universe. This was the first event held by GanPro in this arena and it is regarded as being the largest event produced by the brand as of date.

== Production ==
=== Background ===
Ganbare☆Pro-Wrestling (GanPro) was founded in 2013 by Ken Ohka as a sub-brand of DDT Pro-Wrestling. In 2020, when DDT and Pro Wrestling Noah merged into CyberFight, GanPro and DDT's joshi sub-brand TJPW began being promoted as sister promotions under the CyberFight umbrella.

==== Impact of the COVID-19 pandemic ====
As a result of the COVID-19 pandemic, audiences at pro-wrestling shows had been asked to refrain from emitting vocal noises and limit their interactions to applause. In July 2022, during a press conference, CyberFight announced that those restrictions would be lifted starting with the TJPW event Summer Sun Princess 2022 on July 9.

=== Storylines ===
The event featured eight professional wrestling matches that resulted from scripted storylines, where wrestlers portrayed villains, heroes, or less distinguishable characters in the scripted events that built tension and culminated in a wrestling match or series of matches.

On July 5, GanPro announced the signing of a new female talent, the identity of which will be revealed at the event.

== Results ==
No.	Results	Stipulations	Times
1	Isami Kodaka and Shuji Ishikawa defeated Keisuke Ishii and Shigehiro Irie by pinfall	Tag team match	13:42
2	Kouki Iwasaki and Tyson Maeguchi defeated Tatsuhito Takaiwa and Black Tiger V by pinfall	Tag team match	14:00
3	Ganbare Tamagawa, Nobuhiro Shimatani and Harukaze defeated Onryo, Yuuri and Lingerie Muto by pinfall	Six-person tag team match	9:13
4	Mizuki Watase, Moeka Haruhi and Shinichiro Tominaga defeated Eruption (Yukio Sakaguchi, Saki Akai and Hideki Okatani) by pinfall	Six-person tag team match	15:22
5	Unagi Sayaka defeated Yuna Manase by pinfall	Singles match	12:59
6	Minoru Suzuki defeated Shuichiro Katsumura by pinfall	Singles match	21:45
7	Romance Dawn (Shota and Soma Takao) defeated Calamari Drunken Kings (Chris Brookes and Masahiro Takanashi) by pinfall	Tag team match	23:09
8	Yumehito Imanari (c) defeated Ken Ohka by pinfall	Singles match for the Spirit of Ganbare World Openweight Championship	19:25
(c) / – the champion(s) heading into the match
