= Shinichiro Tominaga =

Japanese wrestler (born 1987)

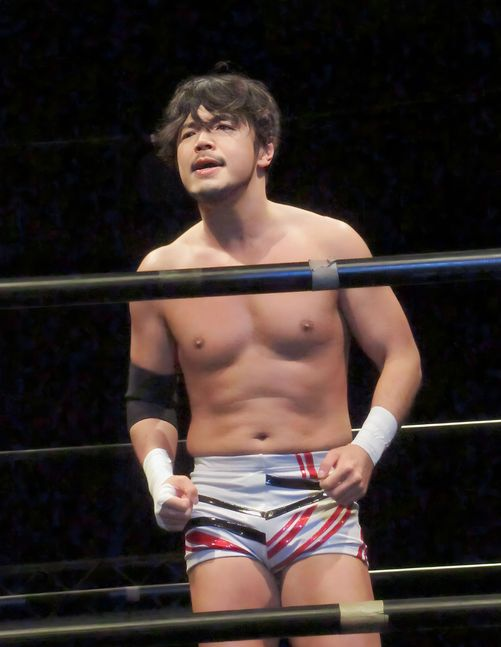
- Tominaga in January 2024

Personal information
- Born: 15 August 1987 (age 38) Toyama, Japan

Professional wrestling career
- Ring name: Eruword Negro Ichiro Tominaga Shinichiro Tominaga
- Billed height: 177 cm (5 ft 10 in)
- Billed weight: 75 kg (165 lb)
- Debut: 2010

Shinichiro Tominaga (冨永真一郎, Tominaga Shinichiro) is a Japanese professional wrestler signed to Ganbare Pro-Wrestling where he is one half of the current Spirit of Ganbare World Tag Team Champions alongside Yumehito Imanari. He is also known for his time in various promotions from the Japanese independent scene.

== Professional wrestling career ==
=== Japanese independent circuit (2010–present) ===
Tominaga competed in New Japan Pro Wrestling's NEVER project, having wrestled several matches in it at NEVER.6: Road to the Super Jr. 2Days Tournament on April 6, 2011, where he fell short to Daisuke Sasaki in singles competition, then on April 7, where he teamed up with Kazuki Hirata in a losing effort against Hiromu Takahashi and Kyosuke Mikami.

=== DDT Pro-Wrestling (2011–2022) ===
Tominaga made his debut in DDT Pro-Wrestling at DDT Monthly Young Communication June Edition on June 4, 2011, where he fell short to Keisuke Ishii in the main event. Tominaga mainly competed in DDT's under the sub-brand of Ganbare Pro. He made his debut at DDT Ganbare Pro-Wrestling "No Cry, No Wrestle" on April 17, 2013, where he defeated Tomohiro Otani.

=== Ganbare Pro-Wrestling (2022–present) ===
Tominaga remained part of the Ganbare Pro roster after the latter officially split from DDT Pro-Wrestling in early 2023. He wrestled at the promotion's first-ever own produced event, the Ganbare Pro Adrenaline 2023 on January 5, where he teamed up with Ken Ohka, Shigehiro Irie and Shota to defeat Hartley Jackson, Keisuke Ishii, Shuichiro Katsumura and Soma Takao.

At Ganbare Pro Kamikaze Taxi 2023 on September 2, he unsuccessfully challenged Isami Kodaka for the Spirit of Ganbare World Openweight Championship. He won the first title of his career, the Spirit of Ganbare World Tag Team Championship at Ganbare Pro Before Sunrise 2025 on December 27, where they defeated Ryota Nakatsu and Takumi Tsukamoto.

Tominaga competed in the promotion's signature event of Ganbare Climax, where he made his first appearance at the inaugural edition of 2017 in which he defeated Shuichiro Katsumura in the first rounds, then fell short to Dave Crist in the second. He scored his best result at the 2022 edition from which he emerged as runner-up by defeating Yuu Yamagata in the first rounds, Survival Tobita in the semifinals, then falling short to Yumehito Imanari in the finals.

At Wrestle Sekigahara, an event produced on July 10, 2022, Tominaga teamed up with Mizuki Watase and Moeka Haruhi to defeat Eruption (Yukio Sakaguchi, Saki Akai and Hideki Okatani).

== Championships and accomplishments ==
- Ganbare Pro-Wrestling
  - Spirit of Ganbare World Tag Team Championship (1 time) – with Yumehito Imanari
  - GWC 6-Man Tag Team Championship (1 time) – with Asuka and Hagane Shinno
