= Spirit of Ganbare World Tag Team Championship =

Professional wrestling tag team championship

Details
- Promotion: Ganbare☆Pro-Wrestling
- Date established: January 5, 2023
- Current champions: Shuichiro Katsumura and Yuya Susumu
- Date won: August 15, 2026
Statistics
- First champions: Hentai Punch Drunkers (Hikaru Sato and Tyson Maeguchi)
- Most reigns: As individual (2 reigns): Takuya Wada; Tyson Maeguchi; Shuichiro Katsumura
- Longest reign: Renegades (Shigehiro Irie and Mizuki Watase) (482 days)
- Shortest reign: Hentai Punch Drunkers (Hikaru Sato and Tyson Maeguchi) (65 days)
- Oldest champion: Shuichiro Katsumura (50 years, 59 days)
- Youngest champion: Mizuki Watase (33 years, 117 days)
- Heaviest champion: Renegades (Shigehiro Irie and Mizuki Watase) (203 kg (448 lb) combined)
- Lightest champion: Shuichiro Katsumura and Yuya Susumu (144 kg (317 lb) combined)

The Spirit of Ganbare World Tag Team Championship (Japanese: スピリット・オブ・ガンバレ世界タッグ王座, Hepburn: Supiritto obu Ganbare Sekai Taggu Ōza) is a professional wrestling tag team championship promoted by the Ganbare☆Pro-Wrestling (GanPro) promotion. The title is the first tag team title to have been created specifically for GanPro, and the second overall. The current champions are Shinichiro Tominaga and Yumehito Imanari.

== History ==
Ganbare☆Pro-Wrestling (GanPro) was founded in 2013 by Ken Ohka as a brand of DDT Pro-Wrestling. The brand was created to capture the spirit of small independent promotions in Japan, regularly bringing in wrestlers from outside the promotion.

In September 2021, GanPro, now part of the CyberFight umbrella promotion, created its first own championship, the Spirit of Ganbare World Openweight Championship, as a prize for the winner of the 2021 Ganbare☆Climax. On January 5, 2023, GanPro followed up with an announcement for the creation of the Spirit of Ganbare World Tag Team Championship. On March 5, at Tsumetai Ame ni Ute, Yakusoku no Jūdan o 2023, the four teams that would compete in a tournament to crown the inaugural champions were announced. On May 5, at Love Phantom 2023, Hentai Punch Drunkers (Hikaru Sato and Tyson Maeguchi) defeated Uruseez (Tatsuhito Takaiwa and Yumehito Imanari) in the final to win the inaugural title.

On April 1, 2024, GanPro officially branched off from CyberFight and became an independent promotion.

=== Inaugural tournament ===
Semifinals; March 25, 2023
Daishōken (Note: Japanese: 大勝健, Hepburn: Daishōken) (Ken Ohka and Shuichiro Katsumura)	23:18
Hentai Punch Drunkers (Note: Japanese: 変態パンチドランカーズ, Hepburn: Hentai Panchi Dorankāzu) (Hikaru Sato and Tyson Maeguchi)	Sub
Uruseez (Note: Japanese: うるせぇズ, Hepburn: Urusēzu) (Tatsuhito Takaiwa and Yumehito Imanari)	Pin
Romance Dawn (Shota and Soma Takao)	17:49

Final; May 5, 2023
Hentai Punch Drunkers	Pin
Uruseez	18:41

== Reigns ==
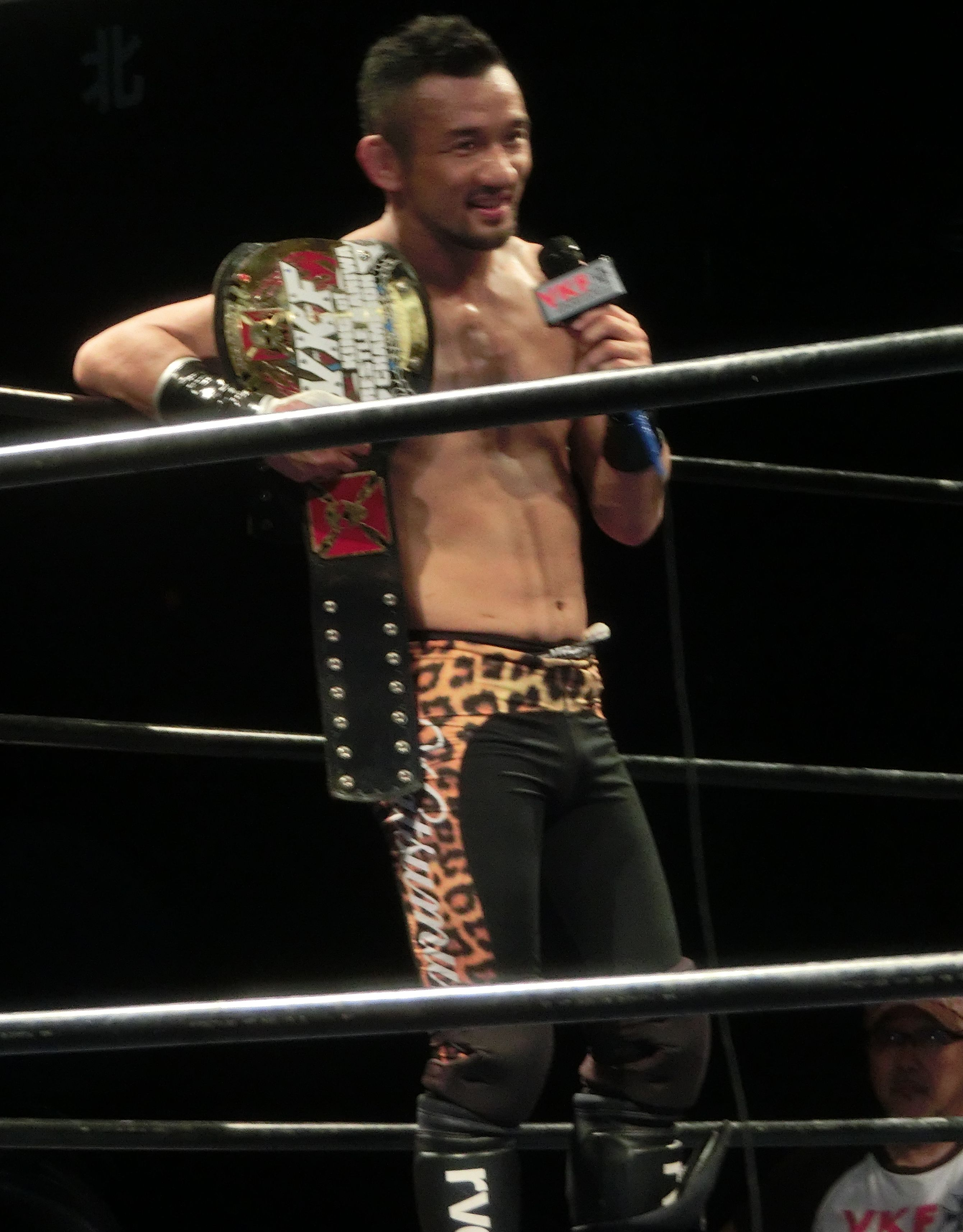
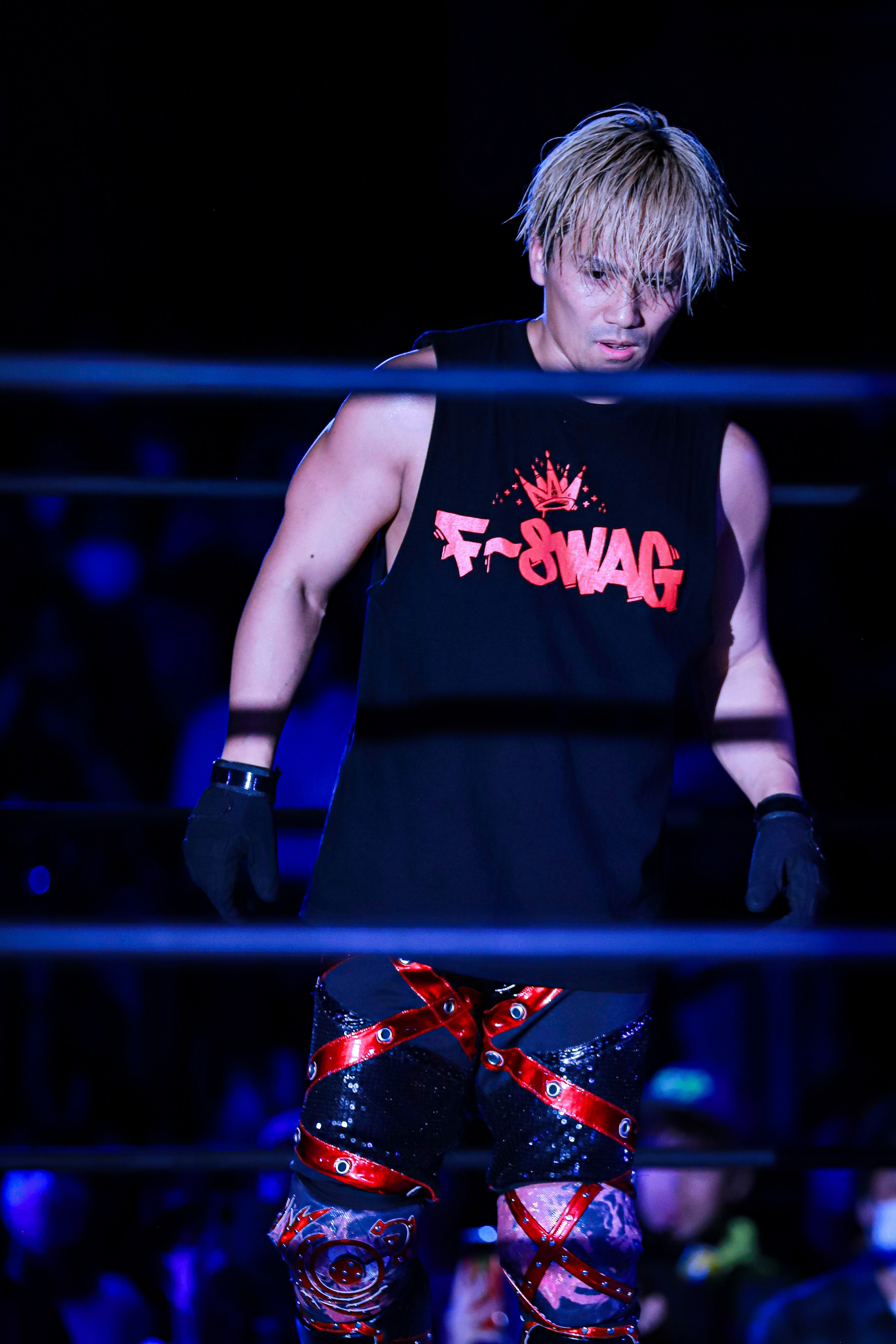
Current champions, Shuichiro Katsumura and Yuya Susumu.

As of November 14, 2026, there have been a total of six reigns between shared between six teams composed of ten individual champions.

The current champions are Shuichiro Katsumura and Yuya Susumu, who are in their first reign as a team, while its the second for Katsumura individually. They won the title by defeating The Deadlock (Takuya Wada and Tyson Maeguchi) on August 15, 2026, at Ganbare Pro It's A Summer Film! 2026 in Tokyo, Japan.

Key
No.	Overall reign number
Reign	Reign number for the specific team—reign numbers for the individuals are in parentheses, if different
Days	Number of days held
Defenses	Number of successful defenses
+	Current reign is changing daily

No.	Champion	Championship change			Reign statistics			Notes	Ref.
No.	Champion	Date	Event	Location	Reign	Days	Defenses	Notes	Ref.
(CF) CyberFight: Ganbare☆Pro-Wrestling (GanPro)
1	Hentai Punch Drunkers (Hikaru Sato and Tyson Maeguchi)	May 5, 2023	Love Phantom 2023	Tokyo, Japan	1	65	1	Defeated Uruseez (Tatsuhito Takaiwa and Yumehito Imanari) in the final of a 4-team tournament to become the inaugural champions.	
2	GroundAbsolute (Shuichiro Katsumura and Takuya Wada)	July 9, 2023	Wrestle Sekigahara II	Tokyo, Japan	1	329	6		
Ganbare☆Pro-Wrestling (GanPro)
3	Renegades (Shigehiro Irie and Mizuki Watase)	June 2, 2024	Wild Gamble 2024	Tokyo, Japan	1	482	5		
4	Ryota Nakatsu and Takumi Tsukamoto	September 27, 2025	Tokorozawa Park Town Shopping Street Show	Saitama, Japan	1	91	3		
5	Shinichiro Tominaga and Yumehito Imanari	December 27, 2025	Before Sunrise 2025	Saitama, Japan	1	123	0		
6	The Deadlock (Takuya Wada and Tyson Maeguchi)	April 29, 2026	Ganbare Pro 13th Anniversary	Tokyo, Japan	1 (2, 2)	129	2		
7	Shuichiro Katsumura and Yuya Susumu	August 15, 2026	Ganbare Pro It's A Summer Film! 2026	Tokyo, Japan	1 (2, 1)	91+	3		

== Combined reigns ==
As of November 14, 2026.

=== By team ===
†	Indicates the current champions

Rank	Team	No. of reigns	Combined defenses	Combined days
1	Renegades (Shigehiro Irie and Mizuki Watase)	1	5	482
2	GroundAbsolute (Shuichiro Katsumura and Takuya Wada)	1	6	329
3	The Deadlock (Takuya Wada and Tyson Maeguchi)	1	2	129
4	Shinichiro Tominaga and Yumehito Imanari	1	0	123
5	Shuichiro Katsumura and Yuya Susumu †	1	3	91+
6	Ryota Nakatsu and Takumi Tsukamoto	1	3	91
7	Hentai Punch Drunkers (Hikaru Sato and Tyson Maeguchi)	1	1	65

=== By wrestler ===
Rank	Wrestler	No. of reigns	Combined defenses	Combined days
1	Shigehiro Irie	1	5	482
1	Mizuki Watase	1	5	482
3	Takuya Wada	2	8	437
4	Shuichiro Katsumura †	2	9	420+
5	Tyson Maeguchi	2	3	173
6	Shinichiro Tominaga	1	0	123
6	Yumehito Imanari	1	0	123
8	Yuya Susumu †	1	3	91+
9	Ryota Nakatsu	1	3	91
9	Takumi Tsukamoto	1	3	91
11	Hikaru Sato	1	1	65

== See also ==
- Professional wrestling in Japan
