= Tyson Maeguchi =

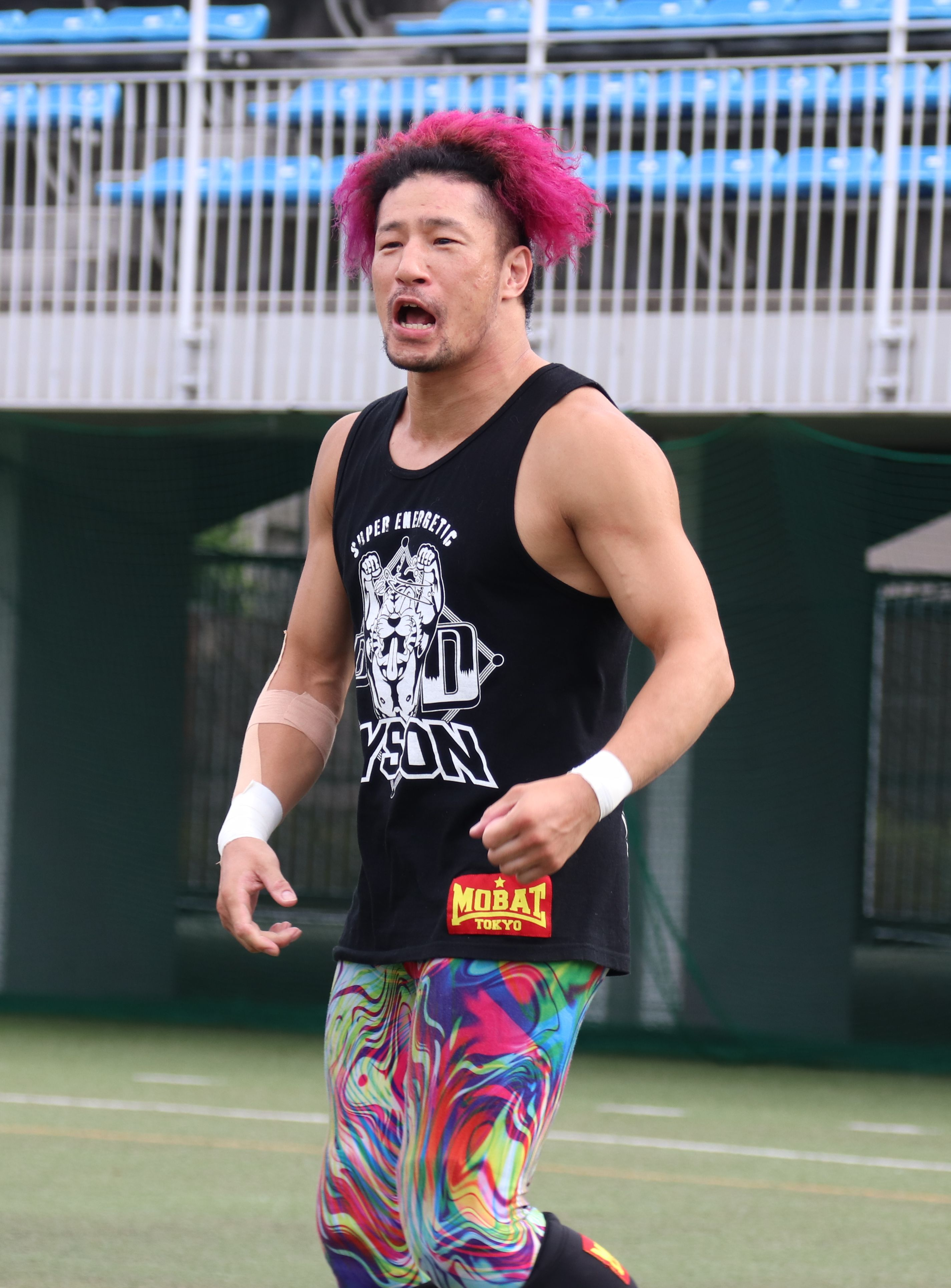
- Maeguchi in August 2022
- Born: Taisuke Maeguchi; September 25, 1986 (age 40); Tokyo, Japan
- Native name: 前口太尊
- Nationality: Japanese
- Height: 1.68 m (5 ft 6 in)
- Weight: 61 kg (134 lb; 9.6 st)
- Division: Bantamweight (Kickboxing)
- Fighting out of: Tokyo, Japan
- Team: Teppen Gym; Team Phoenix
- Years active: 2000–2023

Kickboxing record
- Total: 20
- Wins: 7
- By knockout: 3
- Losses: 13
- By knockout: 6

Tyson Maeguchi
Personal information
- Born: 25 September 1986 (age 40) Tokyo, Japan

Professional wrestling career
- Ring name: Taisuke Maeguchi Taison Maeguchi
- Billed height: 168 cm (5 ft 6 in)
- Billed weight: 61 kg (134 lb)
- Trained by: Kota Ibushi
- Debut: 2017

Taisuke Maeguchi (前口泰祐, Maeguchi Taisuke) better known by his ring name Tyson Maeguchi (前口太尊, Maeguchi Taison) is a Japanese professional wrestler and former kickboxer and Muay Thai fighter. In professional wrestling, he is best known for his time with Ganbare Pro-Wrestling where he is a former Spirit of Ganbare World Tag Team Champion. In kickboxing, he has competed in promotions such as RISE and Knock Out.

== Mixed martial arts career ==
Maeguchi He made his professional mixed martial arts debut in the first round of a Lightweight rookie of the year tournament on April 18, 2010, promoted by J-Network. He was scheduled to compete in the semi-finals in July and the finals in October of the same year, but due to his opponents' absences in both matches, he was awarded rookie of the year accomplishment by walkover. Although also competing in Muay Thai, Maeguchi's main background was kickboxing. He had suffered five straight losses since his bout with Katsuji in August 2017, but he ended the losing streak with a win against Fumio Ujihara in November 2019. Maeguchi officially retired from professional kickboxing in 2023 to pursue a career in professional wrestling.

== Professional wrestling career ==
=== Japanese independent circuit (2017–present) ===
Maeguchi made his professional wrestling debut at Hard Hit All Martial Arts Attack, an event promoted by Hard Hit Wrestling on July 16, 2017, where he wrestled Atsushi Aoki into a time-limit draw.

Having a mixed martial arts background, Maeguchi often competes in UWF Rules matches throughout various events hosted by martial-arts oriented promotions. At GLEAT Ver. EX ~ GLEAT Vs. Kyoteki, an event promoted by Gleat on October 9, 2023, he teamed up with Masakatsu Funaki to defeat Soma Watanabe and Tetsuya Izuchi. At Kakuto Tanteidan III: One Life to Live, an independent show of Battlarts legacy on April 8, 2025, he teamed up with Yuki Ishikawa to defeat Super Tiger II and Thanomsak Toba.

=== Ganbare Pro-Wrestling (2021–present) ===
Maeguchi made his debut in Ganbare Pro-Wrestling at the 2021 edition of the Ganbare Climax where he fell short to Tatsuhito Takaiwa in the first rounds. He was one half of the inaugural Spirit of Ganbare World Tag Team Champions alongside Hikaru Sato, titles which they one by topping a tournament in which they defeated Daishōken (Ken Ohka and Shuichiro Katsumura) in the first rounds, and Uruseez (Tatsuhito Takaiwa and Yumehito Imanari) in the finals on May 5, 2023, at Love Phantom 2023. At Ganbare Pro Wild Gamble 2024 on June 2, Maeguchi competed in a number one contendership battle royal for the Spirit of Ganbare World Openweight Championship won by Choun Shiryu and also involving Baliyan Akki, Daisuke, Gabai Ji-chan, Ken Ohka, Minoru Fujita and Yuna Manase.

At Wrestle Sekigahara on July 10, 2022, he teamed up with Kouki Iwasaki to defeat Tatsuhito Takaiwa and Black Tiger V.

== Championships and accomplishments ==
=== Kickboxing ===
- J-Network
  - J-Network Lightweight Championship (1 time)
  - Rookie of the Year (2010)

=== Professional wrestling ===
- Ganbare Pro-Wrestling
  - Spirit of Ganbare World Tag Team Championship (2 times, inaugural) – with Hikaru Sato (1) and Takuya Wada (1)
  - Spirit Of Ganbare World Tag Team Title Tournament (2023) – with Hikaru Sato

== Fight record ==
Professional Muay Thai and Kickboxing record
7 Wins (3 (T)KO's), 13 Losses, 0 Draws
Date	Result	Opponent	Event	Location	Method	Round	Time
2023-11-19	Win	(Japan) Takamasa Abiko	Rise Fight Club	Tokyo, Japan	TKO (shoulder injury)	2	2:47
2021-07-22	Loss	(Japan) Yosuke Morii	No Kick No Life	Koto, Japan	KO (spinning back elbow)	2	3:02
2020-12-18	Loss	(Japan) Kazuma	Rise 144	Tokyo, Japan	KO (punch)	3	1:32
2020-09-04	Win	(Japan) Yoshihisa Morimoto	Rise 142	Tokyo, Japan	Decision (unanimous)	3	3:00
2020-02-15	Loss	(Japan) Hiroki Kasahara	SHOOT BOXING 2020 act.1	Tokyo, Japan	TKO (Doctor Stoppage)	3	1:14
2019-11-14	Win	(Japan) Fumio Ujihara	Rise 135	Tokyo, Japan	Decision (unanimous)	3	3:00
2019-07-05	Loss	(Japan) Naoki Tanaka	Rise 133	Tokyo, Japan	KO (punches)	1	2:56
2019-04-29	Loss	(Japan) Yoshimichi Matsumoto	Knock Out 2019 Spring	Tokyo, Japan	Decision (majority)	3	3:00
2018-11-18	Loss	(Japan) Kiyoaki Murata	SHOOT BOXING	Tokyo, Japan	Decision (unanimous)	3	3:00
2018-10-07	Loss	(Japan) Hikaru Machida	Knock Out 2018 Cross Over	Tokyo, Japan	Decision (unanimous)	5	3:00
2017-08-20	Loss	(Japan) Katsuji Takahashi	Knock Out Vol. 4	Tokyo, Japan	KO (punches)	5	2:31
2017-06-17	Win	(Japan) Yuma Yamaguchi	Knock Out Vol. 3	Tokyo, Japan	KO (punches)	2	2:25
2016-11-30	Loss	(Thailand) Suarek Rukkukamui	REBELS.47	Tokyo, Japan	Decision (unanimous)	3	3:00
2016-05-29	Loss	(Japan) Kodai Nobe	Rise 111	Tokyo, Japan	Decision (majority)	3	3:00
2016-03-12	Win	(Japan) Haruaki Otsuki	No Kick No Life 2016	Tokyo, Japan	TKO (Doctor Stoppage)	3	0:47
2015-06-06	Loss	(China) Jin Ying	Wu Lin Feng 2015 Battle of the Century	Jiyuan, China	Decision (unanimous)	3	3:00
2015-03-21	Win	(Japan) Junpei Hisai	Rise 104	Tokyo, Japan	Decision (unanimous)	3	3:00
2014-12-29	Loss	(Japan) Motochika Hanada	BLADE 1	Tokyo, Japan	Decision (unanimous)	3	3:00
2014-06-15	Loss	(Thailand) Singtongnoi Por.Telakun	M-FIGHT Suk WEERASAKRECK VI	Tokyo, Japan	KO	2	2:27
2012-08-26	Win	(Japan) Kouzi	J-KICK 2012～NEXT J-GENERATION～4th	Tokyo, Japan	Decision (split)	4	3:00
Legend: Win Loss Draw/No contest Notes
