= Ganbare Climax =

Professional wrestling tournament

Ganbare☆Climax
- Promotions: CyberFight
- Brands: Ganbare☆Pro-Wrestling
- First event: Ganbare☆Climax 2017
- Event gimmick: Single-elimination tournament

The Ganbare Climax (Japanese: ガンバレ☆クライマックス, Hepburn: Ganbare Kuraimakkusu; stylized as Ganbare☆Climax) is a single elimination professional wrestling tournament held by CyberFight in their Ganbare☆Pro-Wrestling (GanPro) brand.

The first two editions in 2017 and 2018 had no stakes other than bragging rights. In 2021, the tournament made a comeback with LEC, Inc. as a sponsor. This edition crowned the inaugural Spirit of Ganbare World Openweight Champion.

== Tournaments ==
Year	Winner	Times won	Participants
2017	Ken Ohka	1	16
2018	Yumehito Imanari	1	8
2021	Tatsuhito Takaiwa	1	14

== Results ==
=== 2017 ===
Ganbare☆Climax 2017
- Promotional picture featuring the 16 participants
- Promotion: DDT Pro-Wrestling
- Brand: Ganbare☆Pro-Wrestling
- Date: August 11–13, 2017
- City: Tokyo, Japan
- Venue: Various; Final: Tokyo KFC Hall

Ganbare☆Climax chronology
← Previous —	Next → 2018

The 2017 Ganbare☆Climax was held from August 11 to August 13. The first two rounds were held on individual nights, with round one taking up the entire card on August 11.

Round 1 August 11
Kazma Sakamoto	Pin
Thanomsak Toba	7:37
Ken Ohka	Pin
Yumehito Imanari	13:35
Hollywood Gota	4:39
Takafumi Ito	Sub
Shinichiro Wakita	6:35
Gentaro	Pin
Shuichiro Katsumura	13:36
Shinichiro Tominaga	Pin
Dave Crist	Pin
Yukihiro Abe	9:12
Kenso	Sub
Ben McCoy	9:58
Chikara	6:07
Kendo Kashin	Sub

Round 2 August 12
Kazma Sakamoto	14:59
Ken Ohka	Pin
Takafumi Ito	11:02
Gentaro	Pin
Shinichiro Tominaga	16:11
Dave Crist	Pin
Kenso	CO
Kendo Kashin	12:20

Semifinals; August 13
Ken Ohka	Pin
Gentaro	6:44
Dave Crist	10:57
Kenso	Sub

Final; August 13
Ken Ohka	Pin
Kenso	16:08

=== 2018 ===
Ganbare☆Climax 2018
- Promotion: DDT Pro-Wrestling
- Brand: Ganbare☆Pro-Wrestling
- Date: August 11–12, 2018
- City: Tokyo, Japan
- Venue: Various; Final: Itabashi Green Hall

Ganbare☆Climax chronology
← Previous; 2017	Next → 2021

The 2018 Ganbare☆Climax was held from August 11 to August 12, and featured only eight participants. Two of the first round matches were held under No DQ & No Ropes rules.

First round August 11
Ken Ohka	13:10
Survival Tobita	Pin†
Shinichiro Tominaga	Pin
Yuu Yamagata	6:03
Yumehito Imanari	KO†
Shin Mokujin Ken	8:10
Shota	Pin
Mitsuo Momota	7:23

Semifinals; August 12
Survival Tobita	3:24
Shinichiro Tominaga	Pin
Yumehito Imanari	Pin
Shota	15:00

Final; August 12
Shinichiro Tominaga	19:08
Yumehito Imanari	Pin

† This was a No DQ & No Ropes match.

=== 2021 ===
Ganbare☆Climax 2021
- Promotion: CyberFight
- Brand: Ganbare☆Pro-Wrestling
- Date: October 24–November 23, 2021
- City: Tokyo, Japan
- Venue: Various; Final: Itabashi Act Hall

Ganbare☆Climax chronology
← Previous; 2018	Next → —

On September 25, 2021, GanPro announced that the Ganbare☆Climax was returning for a third edition sponsored by LEC Cleanpa! that would run from October 24 to November 23. The tournament featured 14 participants (two of which would receive a bye to the second round) and was won by Tatsuhito Takaiwa who was then crowned the inaugural Spirit of Ganbare World Openweight Champion.

Round 1 October 24
Ken Ohka	Pin
Shota	15:24
Keisuke Ishii	2:31
Shinichiro Tominaga	Pin
Yumehito Imanari	Pin
Baliyan Akki	8:56
Kouki Iwasaki	Pin
Nobuhiro Shimatani	11:40
Shuichiro Katsumura	Sub
Seiya Morohashi	15:18
Tatsuhito Takaiwa	Pin
Tyson Maeguchi	7:50

Round 2 November 7
Tetsuhiro Kuroda	Pin
Ken Ohka	14:21
Shinichiro Tominaga	19:06
Yumehito Imanari	Pin
Kouki Iwasaki	13:47
Shuichiro Katsumura	TKO
Tatsuhito Takaiwa	Pin
Mizuki Watase	9:38

Semifinals; November 23
Tetsuhiro Kuroda	Pin
Yumehito Imanari	10:57
Shuichiro Katsumura	Pin
Tatsuhito Takaiwa	13:36

Final; November 23
Yumehito Imanari	12:37
Tatsuhito Takaiwa	Pin

== See also ==
- CyberFight
- DDT Pro-Wrestling
- King of DDT Tournament
