= Hartley Jackson =

Australian professional wrestler

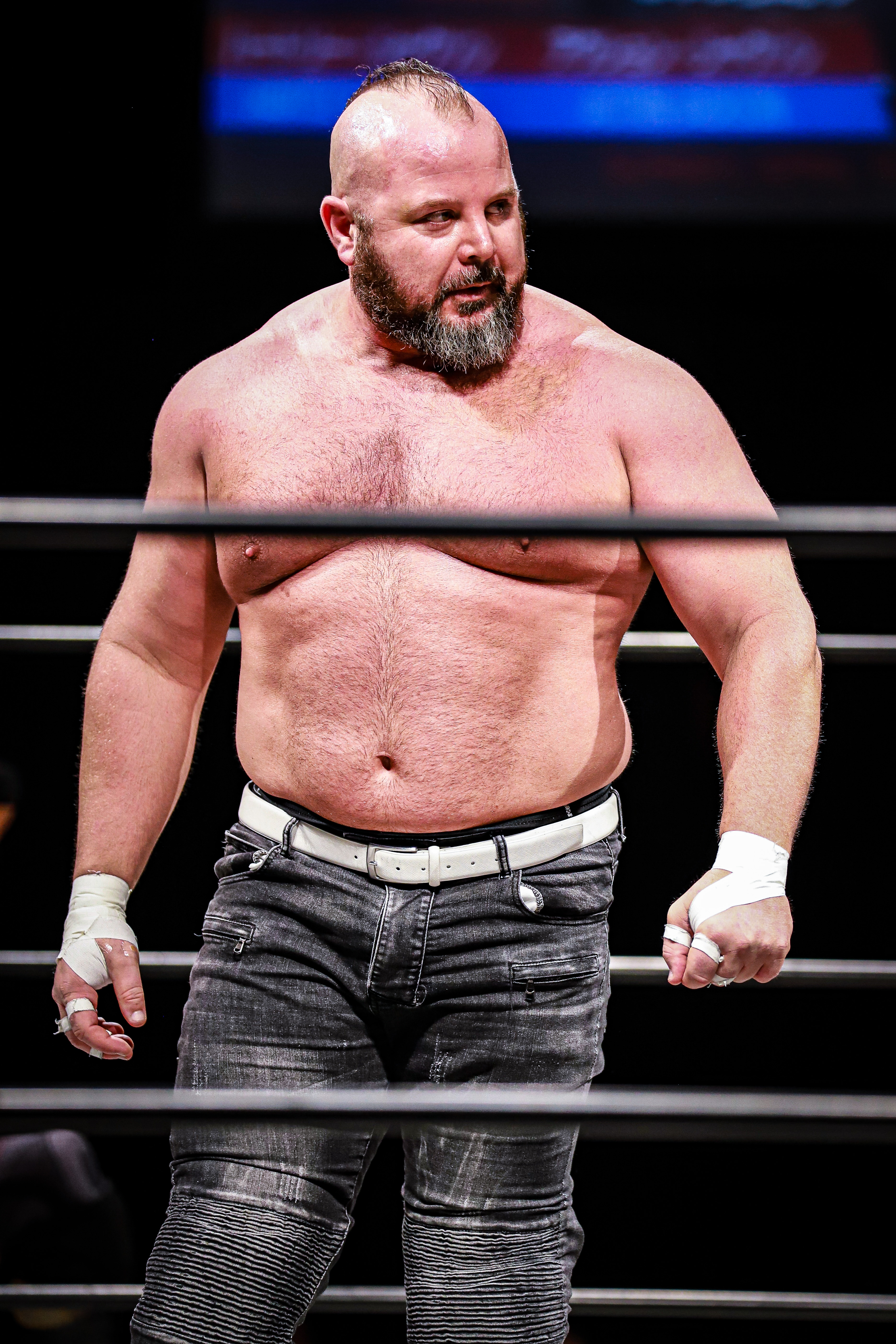
- Jackson in April 2023

Personal information
- Born: 17 April 1980 (age 46) Adelaide, South Australia, Australia

Professional wrestling career
- Ring name(s): Brett James; Dark Wolf; Hartley Jackson; Jacko Kerrigan; JAG
- Billed height: 6 ft 0 in (1.83 m)
- Billed weight: 260 lb (120 kg)
- Trained by: Antonio Inoki; Col Dervaney; Inoki Dojo; Monster Factory; Kendo Kashin
- Debut: 4 October 1999

Hartley Jackson (Note: When wrestling in Japan, his ring name is written in katakana as ハートリー・ジャクソン (Hātorī Jakuson).) (born 17 April 1980) is an Australian professional wrestler and trainer. He currently works as a freelancer―predominantly for New Japan Pro-Wrestling (NJPW), where he is a member of TMDK and is a former one-time NEVER Openweight 6-Man Tag Team Champions alongside stablemates Zack Sabre Jr. and Ryohei Oiwa.

After working on the independent circuit in his native Australia, followed by a short stint in the United States, Jackson has spent the majority of his career in Japan. He has wrestled for the likes of Pro Wrestling Zero1 (Zero1), All Japan Pro Wrestling (AJPW), Ganbare Pro-Wrestling, Big Japan Pro Wrestling (BJW), Gleat and Active Advance Pro Wrestling (2APW). Between 2018 and 2019, he served as an official coach and producer for the NXT brand at the WWE Performance Center, before returning to Japan to wrestle for Zero1 in 2020. He began primarily working for NJPW in 2024 as a member of TMDK.

== Professional wrestling career ==
=== Independent circuit (1999–2020) ===
Hartley Jackson began wrestling in Adelaide, Australia, training under retired regional champion Col Dervaney. Jackson made his in ring debut on 4 October 1999. His first appearance in the PWI 500 was in 2001. In his early years, he captured the MPW and WrestleRock Championships. He wrestled across the country and competed in a Survival Of The Fittest event, a 60 Iron Man minute match, before heading off on his first international excursion overseas. In the latter half of 2005, Jackson travelled to the United States with Mikey Nicholls, where they were a tag team known as The Kerrigans in All Pro Wrestling.

In 2006, Jackson became head coach of what is now called the Wrestle Rampage Dojo in Adelaide, Australia. Over the course of the next decade, he went on to train and mentor many of Australia's current top talents, in which some have reached the heights of WWE and international recognition, including the likes of Bronson Reed, Duke Hudson, Mikey Nicholls, Billie Kay and Peyton Royce.

In October 2008, Jackson returned to Japan to take part in the "PROWRES EXPO 2008" in Tokyo's Ryogoku Kokugikan.

In 2007, he began his rise to a heavyweight wrestler and teamed with Shane Haste to take on NWA Heavyweight Tag Team Champions, Karl Anderson and Joey Ryan in a set of matches for NWA Pro, which took place in Australia. Jackson got involved in an altercation with Australian sports journalist and news presenter, Mark Aiston, where the two would eventually square off in a professional wrestling match.

In 2011, Jackson would simultaneously hold the Zero1 UN Heavyweight Championship, PWA Heavyweight Championship and the EPW Australian national Championship titles. In 2014, Jackson wrestled NJPW's Shinsuke Nakamura during his first tour of Australia for Wrestle Rampage. Jackson continued to travel across Australia, winning the NWA Australian National championship. He formed the South Australian Serial Killers (SASK) tag team in 2014. Teaming with Jonah Rock, they went on to capture the MCW Tag Team Championship and WR Meltdown Tag Team Championship.

In 2020, Jackson quietly left the Australian independent scene and began wrestling full-time in Japan.

=== New Japan Pro-Wrestling (2005–2006) ===
In 2005, Jackson continued to further his professional wrestling training under NJPW founder Antonio Inoki at the Inoki Dojo in Los Angeles. Jackson wrestled on the NJPW Dojo events, co-produced with NWA Pro, that took place at the LA Dojo in Santa Monica, including a match for the NWA British Commonwealth Heavyweight Championship against Fergal Devitt. After his time at the LA Dojo, Jackson was recruited into the ranks of Japan's wrestling scene, where he worked one show with New Japan Pro-Wrestling (NJPW).

=== Pro Wrestling Zero1 (2010–2018) ===
In 2010, Jackson participated in his first tour for Zero1, where he would remain a fixture for the company. He formed a tag team with Steve Corino where they battled Akebono Tarō and Shinjiro Otani for the Intercontinental Tag Team Championships. Between 2010 and 2016, Jackson split his time competing in his home country of Australia, along with locales like Nepal, New Zealand and Myanmar. Myanmar held their first ever professional wrestling event at the Theinphyu Stadium. The Myanmar Martial Arts Wrestling featured Jackson up against Masato Tanaka in a singles match.

Jackson competed in the 2013 Zero1 Tenkaichi Jr. Tournament, dropping to 99.9 kg to make the competing weight, competed in the 2017 Zero1 Furinkazan Tag Team Tournament and also competed in the 2018 Zero1 Fire Festival. In 2018, he also picked up an MVP award for his match against Yusaku Obata for the World Heavyweight Championship.

Between 2016 and 2018, Jackson moved to Japan full-time to work for Zero1. During this time, he became a member of the Voodoo Murders, where he went on to capture the United National Heavyweight Championship and the Intercontinental Tag Team Championship, which he held with Voodoo Murders leader, Yoshikazu Taru. Also in this time, Jackson participated in a series of Exploding Bat matches, fighting against Frontier Martial-Arts Wrestling's Atsushi Onita.

=== WWE (2018–2019) ===
After a series of guest coach appearances, Jackson officially joined the WWE Performance Center as a part of the coaching staff in 2018. Jackson taught classes at the WWE Performance Center. Jackson helped recruit and scout wrestlers for the WWE both at the PC in Orlando and internationally. This included coaching at the first ever WWE Tryouts held in India, with over 70 participants. Jackson also helped train the talent from local independent promotions for WWE's recruitment camps. In 2019, Jackson amicably parted ways with WWE to continue his professional wrestling career in Japan.

=== Return to Zero1 (2020–2024) ===
Jackson returned to Zero1 in 2020 on a permanent basis an active wrestler, but also took over head coach duties at their Dojo.. He has fought for the World Heavyweight Championship and was named as one of the participants in the 2020 Zero1 Fire Festival.

On 3 September 2022, Jackson defeated Yumehito Imanari to win the Spirit of Ganbare World Openweight Championship. He defended it two times before dropping the title to Mizuki Watase on 27 December. Jackson's final Zero1 match took place on 11 July 2024, where he teamed with Chris Vice to defeat Junya Matsunaga and Tsugutaka Sato.

=== All Japan Pro Wrestling (2024) ===
In April to May 2024, Jackson made appearances for All Japan Pro Wrestling (AJPW), competing in the 2024 Champion Carnival, where he was placed in B Block and scored 4 points, but failed to advance to the playoff stage.

=== Return to NJPW (2024–present) ===
On 15 August 2024, during G1 Climax 34, Jackson returned to NJPW for the first time in eighteen years as the newest member of TMDK, replacing the injured Kosei Fujita and partnering Zack Sabre Jr. in a tag team match against Bullet Club War Dogs (David Finlay and Gedo). Jackson then appeared on the Road to King Of Pro-Wrestling and Road to Tokyo Dome tours, as well as at Yuji Nagata's annual Blue Justice show, where he was predominately used in six-man tag team matches. On 23 December, Jackson wrestled his first singles match in NJPW, in a defeat to Jeff Cobb. In 2025, Jackson continuned appearing in NJPW, mainly teaming with TMDK in tag matches.

At Wrestle Kingdom 20 on January 4, 2026, Jackson along with stablemates Zack Sabre Jr. and Ryohei Oiwa won a Ranbo by last eliminating Boltin Oleg and Bishamon (Goto and Yoshi-Hashi) to win the NEVER Openweight Six-Man Tag Team Championship. On January 19 at Road to the New Beginning: Night 1, Jackson, Oiwa, and Sabre lost the NEVER Openweight Six-Man Tag Team Championship to Boltin Oleg, Hirooki Goto and Yoshi-Hashi. In March 2026, Jackson competed in his first New Japan Cup, where he received a first-round bye but was eliminated by eventual winner Callum Newman.

== Other appearances ==
Jackson appeared as a tough guy in the 2008 Bollywood movie, Love Story 2050. In 2016, Jackson played the role of Connor in web series Runaway Moon, and was a guest on the full episode of Talkn' Shop Live in Australia, presented by Talk is Jericho. In 2020, he appeared on an episode of WWE The Bump, and has appeared in multiple episodes of Samurai TV's Battlemen in Japan.

== Lethwei ==
On 28 September 2017, Jackson made his Lethwei debut at Lethwei in Japan 5: Nexurise for International Lethwei Federation Japan in Tokyo at Korakuen Hall. He fought by the Burmese bareknuckle boxing rules, known as Lethwei, against YABU, in the company's first 100 kg heavyweight fight. Jackson lost to YABU via TKO at 0:53 of RD3. The fight was broadcast on FITE TV. Jackson has expressed interest in fighting again in the future.

=== Lethwei record ===
Professional Lethwei record
0 wins (0 (T)KOs), 1 losses, 0 draws
| Date | Result | Opponent | Event | Location | Method | Round | Time |
| 2017-09-28 | Loss | (Japan) YABU | Lethwei in Japan 5: Nexurise | Tokyo, Japan | TKO | 3 | 0:53 |
For the inaugural Cruiserweight World Lethwei Championship Title.
Legend: Win Loss Draw/No contest Notes

== Championships and accomplishments ==
- Explosive Pro Wrestling
  - State of Origin Champion (2016)
- Ganbare Pro-Wrestling
  - Spirit of Ganbare World Openweight Championship (1 time)
- Joint Promotions Wrestling
  - JPW Championship (2 times)
- New Japan Pro-Wrestling
  - NEVER Openweight 6-Man Tag Team Championship (1 time) – with Zack Sabre Jr. and Ryohei Oiwa
- NWA Australian Wrestling Alliance
  - Pacific Tag Team Championship (1 time) – with Havok
- Pro Wrestling Australia
  - PWA Heavyweight Championship (1 time)
- Pro Wrestling Illustrated
  - Ranked No. 210 of the top 500 singles wrestlers in the PWI 500 in 2011
- Pro Wrestling Zero1
  - United National Heavyweight Championship (2 times)
  - Intercontinental Tag Team Championship (1 time) – with Yoshikazu Taru
  - Fire Festival (2020)
- Wrestle Rampage
  - Zero1 Australian National Championship (2 times)
  - Meltdown World Tag Team Championships (1 time) – with Jonah Rock
- WrestleRock
  - WrestleRock Championship (2 times)
