= Kōkū-kōen Park Town Championship =

Professional wrestling championship

Details
- Promotion: Ganbare☆Pro-Wrestling
- Date established: August 24, 2019
- Current champion: Keisuke Ishii
- Date won: August 24, 2019
Statistics
- First champion: Keisuke Ishii

The Kōkū-kōen Park Town Championship (Japanese: 航空公園パークタウン王座, Hepburn: Kōkū-kōen Pāku Taun Ōza) is an inactive professional wrestling championship in Ganbare☆Pro-Wrestling, a sub-brand of the Japanese promotion CyberFight. The title, named after the Kōkū-kōen Park Town shopping street near Kōkū-kōen Station, was established in 2019 and was only contested in its inaugural match, in Tokorozawa, Saitama.

== Title history ==
Keisuke Ishii was crowned the first champion after he pinned Shuhei Washida in a Falls Count Anywhere tag team match. He was awarded the title by the manager of the Fresh Ariyama store where the match took place. Since then, the title has never been defended, nor has it been officially deactivated.

== Reigns ==
Key
No.	Overall reign number
Reign	Reign number for the specific champion
Days	Number of days held
Defenses	Number of successful defenses
+	Current reign is changing daily

No.	Champion	Championship change			Reign statistics			Notes	Ref.
No.	Champion	Date	Event	Location	Reign	Days	Defenses	Notes	Ref.
1	Keisuke Ishii	August 24, 2019	Ganbare☆Kōkū-kōen	Tokorozawa, Japan	1	2,505+	0	Teamed up with Shota to defeat Ken Ohka and Shuhei Washida in a Falls Count Anywhere tag team match and was awarded the title.	

== See also ==
- DDT Pro-Wrestling
- Professional wrestling in Japan
