= Yumehito Imanari =

Japanese professional wrestler

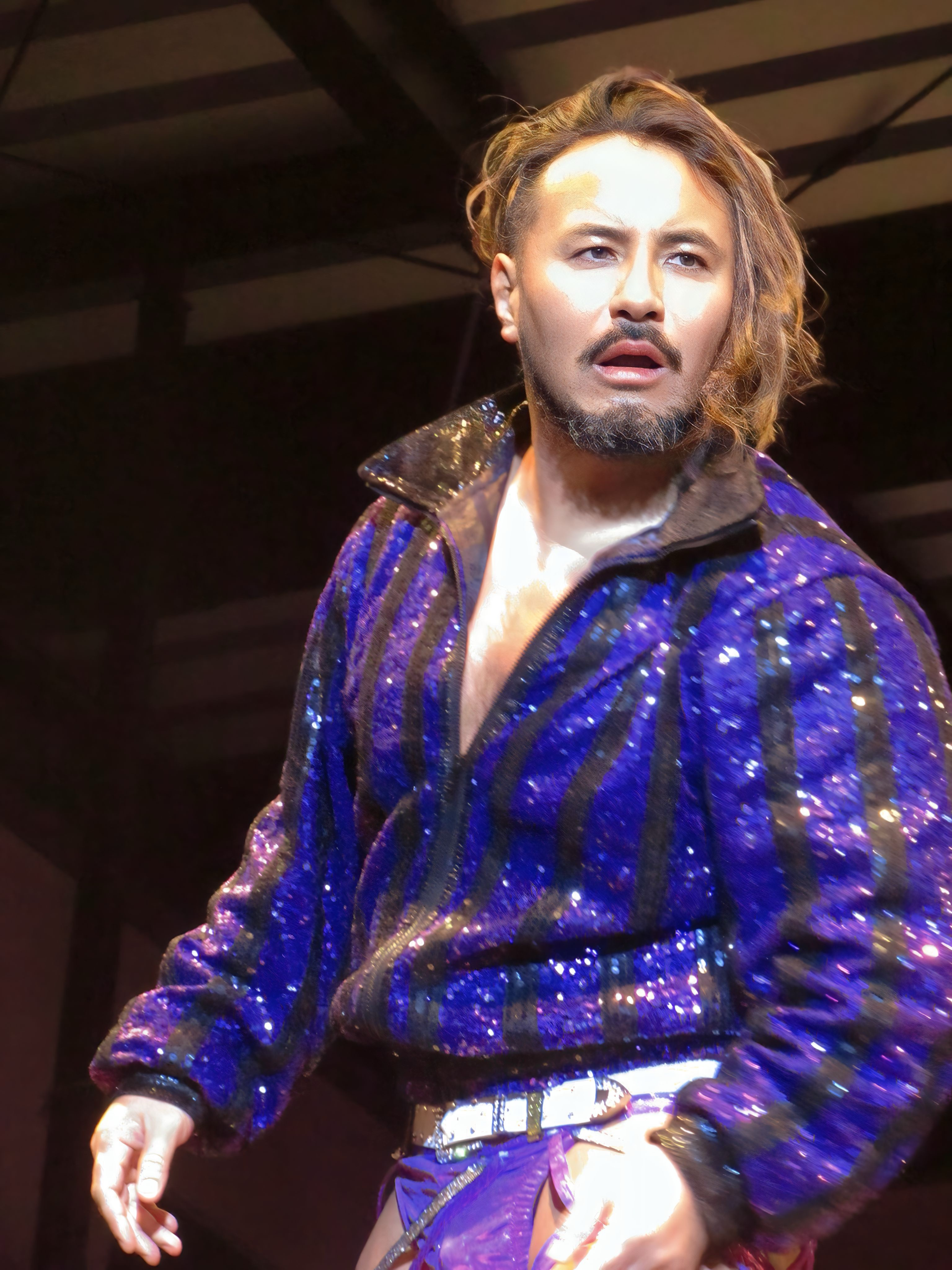
- Imanari in January 2024

Personal information
- Born: September 22, 1985 (age 41) Nagaoka, Japan

Professional wrestling career
- Ring name(s): Yumehito Imanari; Yumehito "Fantastic" Imanari; Yumeto Imasei; Yuusha Imanari; Yumeto
- Billed height: 167 cm (5 ft 6 in)
- Billed weight: 73 kg (161 lb)
- Debut: 2013

Yumehito Imanari (今成夢人, Imanari Yumehito) is a Japanese professional wrestler currently working for the CyberFight wrestling promotion. He has made appearances in Ganbare Pro-Wrestling (GanPro) under his real name, and in DDT Pro-Wrestling as part of the Pheromones stable under the name Yumehito "Fantastic" Imanari (今成"ファンタスティック"夢人, Imanari "Fantasutikku" Yumehito).

== Professional wrestling career ==
=== Ganbare Pro Wrestling (2013–present) ===
Imanari made his professional wrestling debut on April 17, 2013 at No Cry, No Wrestle, an event hosted by Ganbare Pro-Wrestling, in a loss to Osamu Namiguchi. At Can You Celebrate? on September 29, 2018, he unsuccessfully challenged Keisuke Ishii for the Independent World Junior Heavyweight Championship. Imanari won the 2018 edition of the Ganbare Climax after defeating Shinichiro Tominaga in the finals of the tournament.

Imanari has often wrestled in unusual matches, such as a 13-on-1 handicap match at Momoiro Kneel Kick on April 14, 2019, where he joined Cherry, Gota Ihashi, Minoru Fujita, Moeka Haruhi and several other wrestlers to defeat Ken Ohka.

On May 3, 2022, Imanari defeated Tatsuhito Takaiwa to win the Spirit of Ganbare World Openweight Championship.

=== DDT Pro-Wrestling (2013–present) ===
Imanari has made a limited number of appearances in DDT Pro-Wrestling, the parent promotion of GanPro. At Beer Garden Fight on August 2, 2018, Imanari competed in a 20-man falls count anywhere battle royal alongside Antonio Honda, Super Sasadango Machine, Danshoku Dieno, Yasu Urano, Yuki Ueno and other wrestlers.

Imanari has also competed in some of the promotion's signature events, such as DDT Peter Pan; he made his first appearance at Ryōgoku Peter Pan 2018 on October 21, where he participated in a Rumble rules match alongside Gorgeous Matsuno, Shota, Tiger Mask, and the eventual winner Nobuhiro Shimatani. On November 3, 2019, Imanari made an appearance at Ultimate Party 2019 where he teamed up with Ken Ohka and Miss Mongol to face Takumi Tsukamoto, Yasu Urano and Takato Nakano and Damnation (Tetsuya Endo, Mad Paulie and Nobuhiro Shimatani) in a three-way match for the UWA World Trios Championship. At CyberFight Festival 2021, a cross-over event promoted by CyberFight in collaboration with DDT, Pro Wrestling Noah and Tokyo Joshi Pro Wrestling, Imanari teamed up with Shuichiro Katsumura and Kouki Iwasaki to defeat Ken Ohka, Keisuke Ishii and Shota in a six-man tag team match. In 2021, he formed the Pheremones stable with Danshoku "Dandy" Dieno & Yuki "Sexy" Iino.

=== Pro Wrestling Zero1 (2020–present) ===
Imanari has also competed in Pro Wrestling Zero1. In 2020, Imanari and Shinjiro Otani won the 2020 edition of the Furinkazan Tournament. The pair defeated the Revengers (Takuya Sugawara and Masato Tanaka) in the first round, Voodoo Murders (Yoshikazu Yokoyama and Chris Vice) in the semi-finals, and the Kubota Brothers (Yasu Kubota and Hide Kubota) in the final on December 25. In the process, Imanari and Otani won the vacant NWA Intercontinental Tag Team Championship. At the 2021 edition of the event, Imanari teamed up with Yuna Manase and lost to Hartley Jackson and Junya Matsunaga in the first round.

== Championships and accomplishments ==
- DDT Pro-Wrestling

- GWC 6-Man Tag Team Championship (2 times) – with Ken Ohka and Miss Mongol
- King of Dark Championship (1 time)
- KO-D 6-Man Tag Team Championship (1 time, current) – with Danshoku "Dandy" Dino and Yuki "Sexy" Iino
- I Will Not Give Up Tag Tournament (2017) – with Bambi
- Bakuha Koshien Spring Tag Tournament (2021) – with Yukio Naya, Sanshiro Takagi and Atsushi Onita

- Ganbare Pro-Wrestling

- Spirit of Ganbare World Openweight Championship (2 times)
- Spirit of Ganbare World Tag Team Championship (1 time) – with Shinichiro Tominaga
- Ganbare Climax (2018)
- Young Ganbare Cup (2023)

- Japan Indie Awards

- Best Unit Award (2021) – with Danshoku "Dandy" Dino and Yuki "Sexy" Iino

- Pro Wrestling Zero1

- NWA Intercontinental Tag Team Championship (1 time) – with Shinjiro Otani
- Furinkazan (2020) – with Shinjiro Otani

- Pro Wrestling Illustrated
  - Ranked No. 409 of the top 500 singles wrestlers in the PWI 500 in 2025
- Professional Wrestling Just Tap Out

- JTO Tag Team Championship (1 time) – with Kentaro Hachisu
