= Ganbare Pro-Wrestling =

Japanese wrestling promotion

Ganbare☆Pro-Wrestling
- GanPro logo
- Acronym: GanPro
- Founded: April 17, 2013 (in DDT/CF); April 1, 2024 (independent)
- Style: Puroresu
- Headquarters: Shibuya, Tokyo, Japan
- Founder: Ken Ohka
- Owner: Ken Ohka
- Split from: DDT Pro-Wrestling
- Website: ganpro.net

Ganbare☆Pro-Wrestling (Japanese: ガンバレ☆プロレス, Hepburn: Ganbare Puroresu; abbreviated as GanPro) is a Japanese professional wrestling promotion founded in 2013 as a sister promotion of DDT Pro-Wrestling (DDT). The promotion ran as a brand under the DDT umbrella, until DDT became CyberFight in 2020. It was then considered a sister promotion to DDT, Tokyo Joshi Pro Wrestling and Pro Wrestling Noah, until 2024 when GanPro became independent.

== History ==
Ganbare☆Pro-Wrestling (GanPro) was created in 2013 by Ken Ohka as a brand of DDT Pro-Wrestling. The brand was created to capture the spirit of small independent promotions in Japan and, to do so, regularly brought in wrestlers from outside the promotion. In July 2020, DDT and Pro Wrestling Noah merged to form CyberFight. In September 2021, GanPro revived the Ganbare☆Climax and created the Spirit of Ganbare World Openweight Championship as a prize for the winner of the tournament.

On December 15, 2023, GanPro was announced as one of the founding members of the United Japan Pro-Wrestling alliance, a joint effort to further develop professional wrestling in Japan through promotion and organization, with Seiji Sakaguchi being named as the chairman of the project.

On January 31, 2024, a press conference was held to announce GanPro would become independent from CyberFight at the end of March, with the final GanPro event under the CyberFight umbrella to be held on March 28. The split was made official on March 31, with Shota, Yoshiko Hasegawa and Riara leaving the promotion to become freelancers.

== Personnel ==
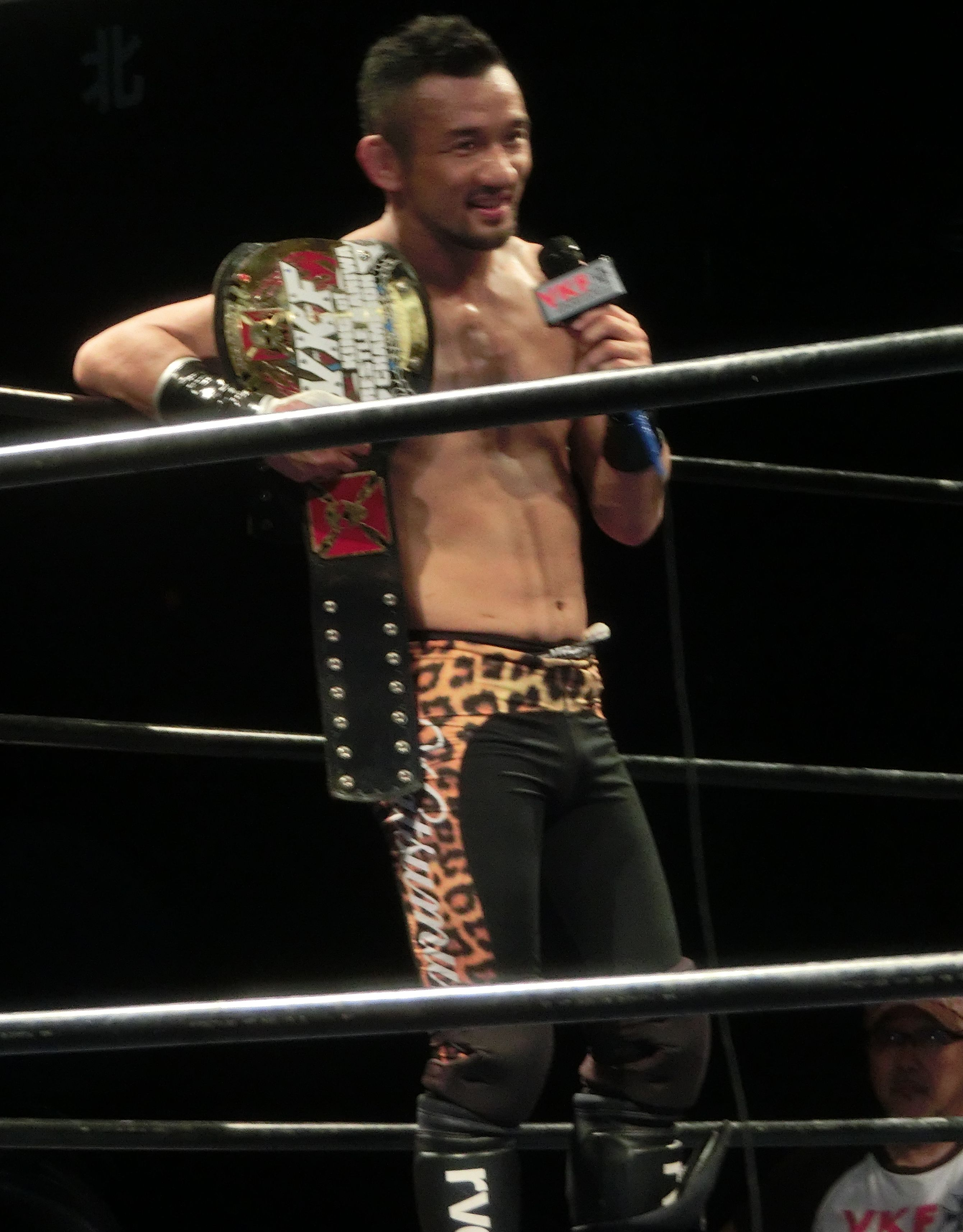
Shuichiro Katsumura

| Ring name | Real name | Notes |
|---|---|---|
| Harukaze | Haruka Kato | |
| Keisuke Ishii | Keisuke Ishii | |
| Ken Ohka | Ken Ohka | |
| Mizuki Watase | Mizuki Watase | Spirit of Ganbare World Openweight Champion |
| Moeka Haruhi | Unknown | |
| Munetatsu Nakamura | Munetatsu Nakamura | |
| Sentaro Motojima | Sentaro Motojima | |
| Shinichiro Tominaga | Shinichiro Tominaga | Spirit of Ganbare World Tag Team Champion |
| Shota Kawakami | Shota Kawakami | |
| Shuichiro Katsumura | Shuichiro Katsumura | |
| Yumehito Imanari | Yumehito Imanari | Spirit of Ganbare World Tag Team Champion |
| Yuna Manase | Unknown | |
| Yuuri | Unknown | |

== Championships ==
=== Current championships ===
| Championship | Current champion(s) | Reign | Date won | Days held | Location | Notes | Ref. |
|---|---|---|---|---|---|---|---|
| Spirit of Ganbare World Openweight Championship | Mizuki Watase | 2 | February 22, 2026 | 202+ | Tokyo, Japan | Defeated Masaaki Mochizuki at A Scanner Darkly 2026. | |
| Spirit of Ganbare World Tag Team Championship | Shuichiro Katsumura and Yuya Susumu | 1 (2, 1) | August 15, 2026 | 28+ | Tokyo, Japan | Defeated The Deadlock (Takuya Wada and Tyson Maeguchi) at Ganbare Pro It's A Summer Film! 2026. | |

=== Tournaments ===
| Accomplishment | Last winner(s) | Date won | Location | Notes |
|---|---|---|---|---|
| Ganbare☆Climax | Tatsuhito Takaiwa | November 23, 2021 | Tokyo, Japan | Defeated Yumehito Imanari in the tournament final. |
| Mixed Tag Tournament | Moeka Haruhi and Shuichiro Katsumura | June 27, 2021 | Tokyo, Japan | Defeated Harukaze and Keisuke Ishii in the tournament final. |

=== Inactive championship ===
| Championship | Last champion(s) | Reign | Date won | Location | Notes |
|---|---|---|---|---|---|
| Kōkū-kōen Park Town Championship | Keisuke Ishii | 1 | August 24, 2019 | Tokorozawa, Japan | Teamed up with Shota to defeat Ken Ohka and Shuhei Washida in a Falls Count Anywhere tag team match and was awarded the title. Inactive since. |

== Major events ==
| Event | Date | Location | Venue | Main event | Notes |
|---|---|---|---|---|---|
| Wrestle Sekigahara | July 10, 2022 | Tokyo, Japan | Ota City General Gymnasium | Yumehito Imanari (c) vs. Ken Ohka for the Spirit of Ganbare World Openweight Championship | |
