= Uchicomi! Openweight Ultimate Championship =

Professional wrestling championship

Details
- Promotion: DDT Pro-Wrestling
- Current champion(s): Ken Ohka
- Date won: July 22, 2018
Statistics
- First champion(s): Ken Ohka

The Uchicomi! Openweight Ultimate Championship (Japanese: ウチコミ！無差別級アルティメット王座, Hepburn: Uchikomi! Musabetsu-kyū Arutimetto Ōza) is an inactive professional wrestling championship in the Japanese promotion DDT Pro-Wrestling. The title was established in 2018 and was only contested in its inaugural match, on July 22, at Summer Vacation 2018. The belt was sponsored by the Uchicomi! real estate agency.

== Title history ==
Between 2016 and 2018, the real estate agency Uchicomi! was a regular sponsor of DDT Pro-Wrestling. On July 22, 2018, at Summer Vacation 2018, the Uchicomi! Openweight Ultimate Championship was contested in a Scramble Tag Team Rumble Match in which seven teams entered the match in a regular rumble rules match fashion until one team emerged. The victorious tag partners then went on to fight in a regular singles match for the inaugural title. In this second phase of the match, Ken Ohka defeated Gota Ihashi and was presented with the belt by Uchicomi! director Michiaki Nakano.

Since then, the title has never been defended, nor has it been officially deactivated.

== Reigns ==
Key
| No. | Overall reign number |
| Reign | Reign number for the specific champion |
| Days | Number of days held |
| Defenses | Number of successful defenses |
| + | Current reign is changing daily |

| No. | Champion | Championship change | | | Reign statistics | | | Notes | Ref. |
| No. | Champion | Date | Event | Location | Reign | Days | Defenses | Notes | Ref. |
|---|---|---|---|---|---|---|---|---|---|
| 1 | Ken Ohka | July 22, 2018 | Summer Vacation 2018 | Tokyo, Japan | 1 | 2,441+ | 0 | Won a Scramble Tag Team Rumble Match by defeating Gota Ihashi. | |

== See also ==
- DDT Pro-Wrestling
- Professional wrestling in Japan
