= Spirit of Ganbare World Openweight Championship =

Professional wrestling championship

- The Spirit of Ganbare World Openweight Championship title belt

Details
- Promotion: Ganbare☆Pro-Wrestling
- Date established: September 25, 2021
- Current champion: Mizuki Watase
- Date won: February 22, 2026
Statistics
- First champion: Tatsuhito Takaiwa
- Most reigns: Yumehito Imanari and Mizuki Watase (2 reigns)
- Longest reign: Mizuki Watase (252+ days)
- Shortest reign: Hartley Jackson (115 days)
- Oldest champion: Masaaki Mochizuki (55 years, 221 days)
- Youngest champion: Mizuki Watase (31 years, 324 days)
- Heaviest champion: Hartley Jackson (120 kg (260 lb))
- Lightest champion: Yumehito Imanari (73 kg (161 lb))

The Spirit of Ganbare World Openweight Championship (Japanese: スピリット・オブ・ガンバレ世界無差別級王座, Hepburn: Supiritto obu Ganbare Sekai Musabetsu-kyū Ōza) is a professional wrestling championship promoted by the Ganbare☆Pro-Wrestling (GanPro) promotion. The title is the first to be created specifically for GanPro. The current champion is Mizuki Watase who is in his second reign.

== History ==
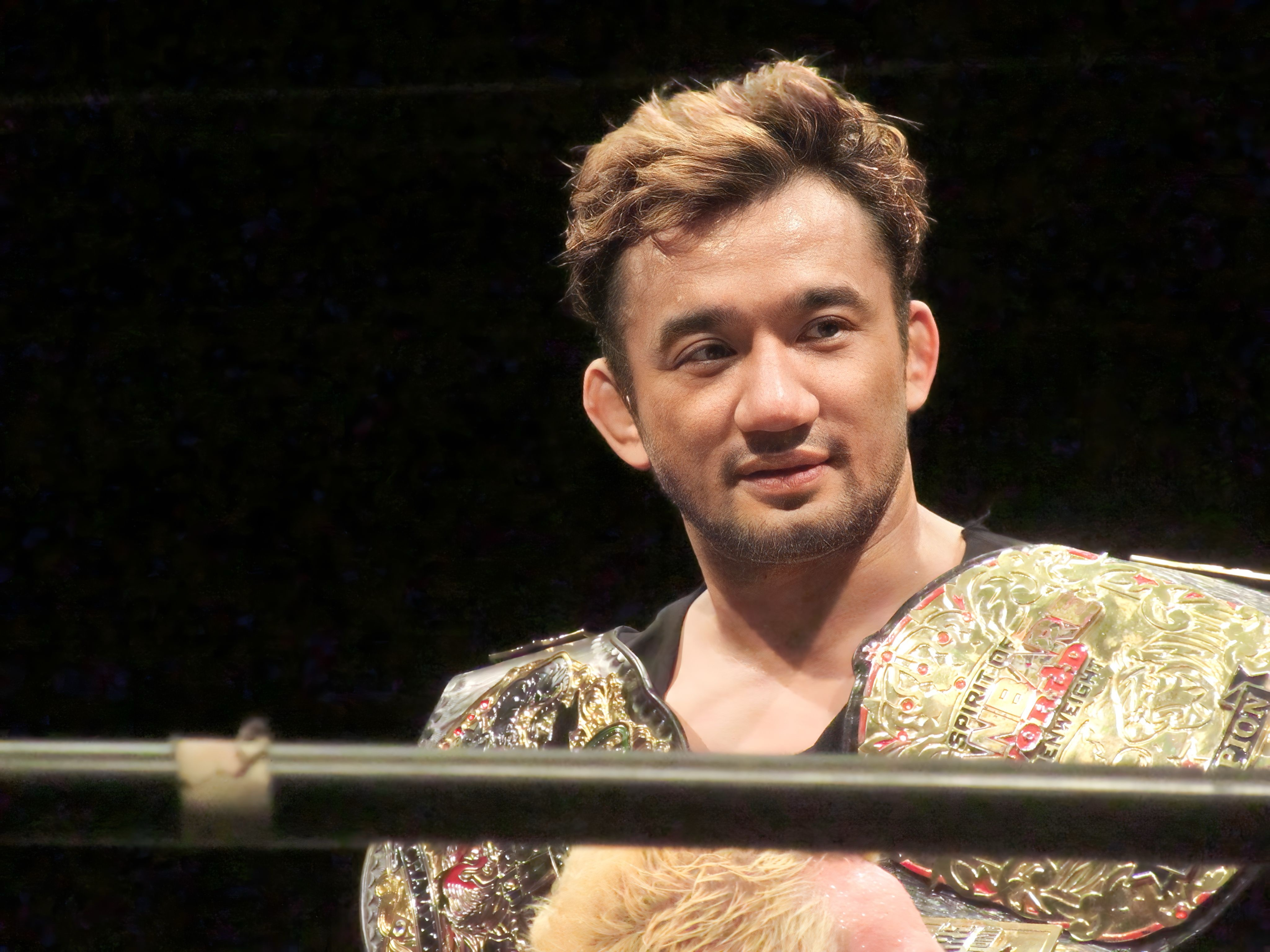
Shuichiro Katsumura wearing the belt on his left shoulder

Ganbare☆Pro-Wrestling (GanPro) was founded in 2013 by Ken Ohka as a brand of DDT Pro-Wrestling. The brand was created to capture the spirit of small independent promotions in Japan, regularly bringing in wrestlers from outside the promotion.

On March 18, 2017, Ohka defeated Shiori Asahi at a Kaientai Dojo event to win the Independent World Junior Heavyweight Championship. The title remained with GanPro, where it served as the main singles title until January 2021, when it moved to Professional Wrestling Just Tap Out (JTO). Without a singles title to promote, GanPro, now part of the CyberFight umbrella promotion, revived the Ganbare☆Climax tournament in September 2021 and created the Spirit of Ganbare World Openweight Championship as the prize for the winner of the tournament. On November 23, Tatsuhito Takaiwa defeated Yumehito Imanari in the final to win the inaugural title.

On April 1, 2024, GanPro officially branched off from CyberFight and became an independent promotion.

=== Inaugural tournament ===
Round 1 October 24
Ken Ohka	Pin
Shota	15:24
Keisuke Ishii	2:31
Shinichiro Tominaga	Pin
Yumehito Imanari	Pin
Baliyan Akki	8:56
Kouki Iwasaki	Pin
Nobuhiro Shimatani	11:40
Shuichiro Katsumura	Sub
Seiya Morohashi	15:18
Tatsuhito Takaiwa	Pin
Tyson Maeguchi	7:50

Round 2 November 7
Tetsuhiro Kuroda	Pin
Ken Ohka	14:21
Shinichiro Tominaga	19:06
Yumehito Imanari	Pin
Kouki Iwasaki	13:47
Shuichiro Katsumura	TKO
Tatsuhito Takaiwa	Pin
Mizuki Watase	9:38

Semifinals; November 23
Tetsuhiro Kuroda	Pin
Yumehito Imanari	10:57
Shuichiro Katsumura	Pin
Tatsuhito Takaiwa	13:36

Final; November 23
Yumehito Imanari	12:37
Tatsuhito Takaiwa	Pin

== Reigns ==
As of November 1, 2026, there have been a total of ten reigns shared among eight different wrestlers. The current champion is Mizuki Watase who is in his second reign.

Key
No.	Overall reign number
Reign	Reign number for the specific champion
Days	Number of days held
Defenses	Number of successful defenses
+	Current reign is changing daily

No.	Champion	Championship change			Reign statistics			Notes	Ref.
No.	Champion	Date	Event	Location	Reign	Days	Defenses	Notes	Ref.
CyberFight: Ganbare☆Pro-Wrestling
1	Tatsuhito Takaiwa	November 23, 2021	Ganbare☆Climax 2021 Final Round	Tokyo, Japan	1	161	3	Defeated Yumehito Imanari in the final of a 14-man tournament to become the inaugural champion.	
2	Yumehito Imanari	May 3, 2022	Love Phantom 2022	Tokyo, Japan	1	123	2		
3	Hartley Jackson	September 3, 2022	Punch Drunk Love 2022	Tokyo, Japan	1	115	2		
4	Mizuki Watase	December 27, 2022	Giri Giri Chop! 2022	Tokyo, Japan	1	194	4		
5	Isami Kodaka	July 9, 2023	Wrestle Sekigahara II	Tokyo, Japan	1	171	4		
6	Shuichiro Katsumura	December 27, 2023	Bad Communication 2023	Tokyo, Japan	1	122	2		
Ganbare☆Pro-Wrestling
7	Keisuke Ishii	April 27, 2024	Spring Breakers 2024	Tokyo, Japan	1	244	4		
8	Yumehito Imanari	December 27, 2024	Itsuka Giragira Suru Hi 2024	Tokyo, Japan	2	242	5		
9	Masaaki Mochizuki	August 26, 2025	Mizuki Watase 10th Anniversary: It's a Summer Film 2025	Tokyo, Japan	1	180	5		
10	Mizuki Watase	February 22, 2026	A Scanner Darkly 2026	Tokyo, Japan	2	252+	8		

== Combined reigns ==
As of November 1, 2026.

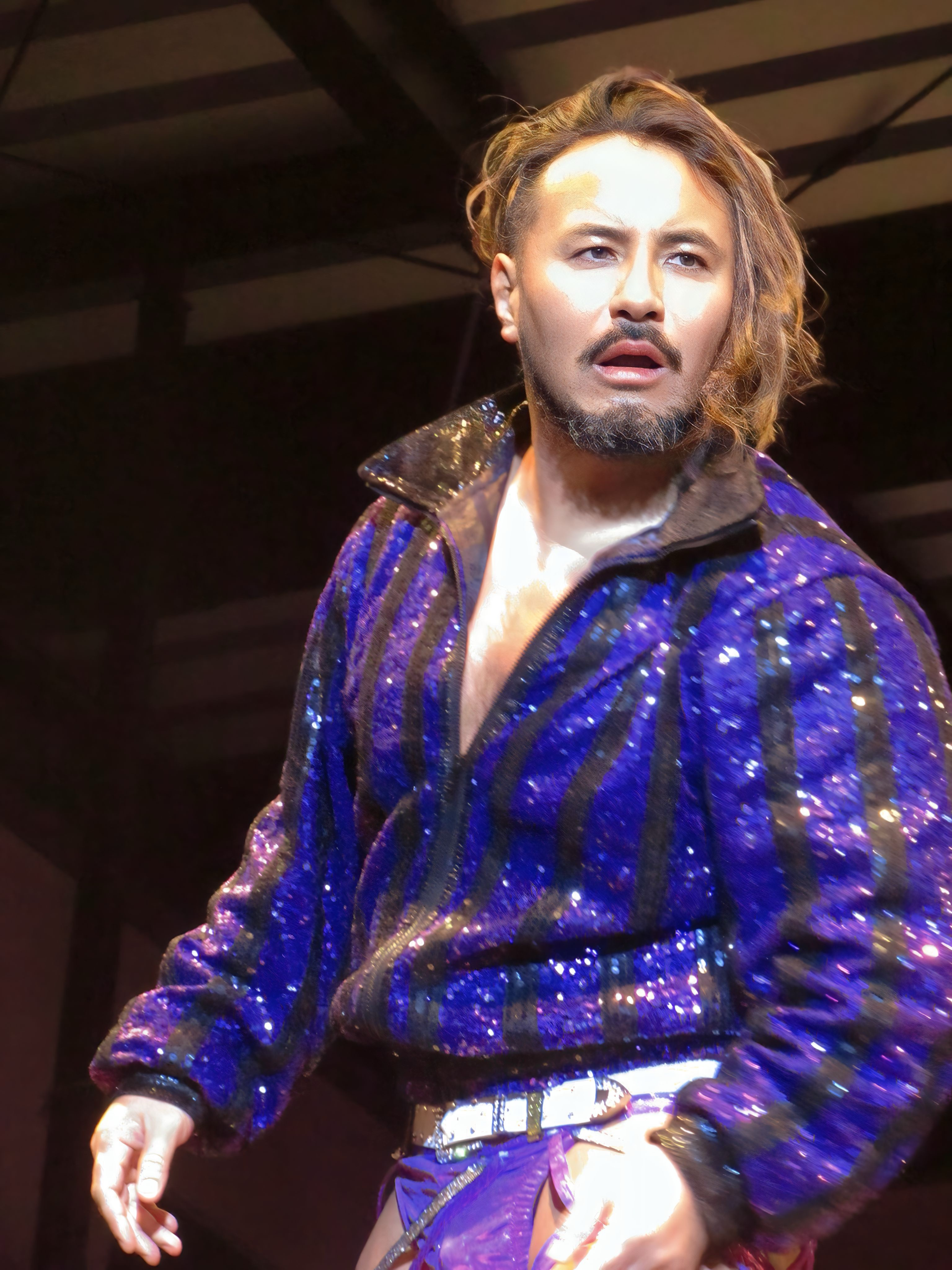
Record two-time and longest reigning champion Yumehito Imanari

†	Indicates the current champions

Rank	Wrestler	No. of reigns	Combined defenses	Combined days
1	Mizuki Watase †	2	12	446+
2	Yumehito Imanari	2	7	365
3	Keisuke Ishii	1	4	244
4	Masaaki Mochizuki	1	5	180
5	Isami Kodaka	1	4	171
6	Tatsuhito Takaiwa	1	3	161
7	Shuichiro Katsumura	1	2	122
8	Hartley Jackson	1	2	115

== See also ==
- Professional wrestling in Japan
