= Masaaki Mochizuki =

Japanese professional wrestler

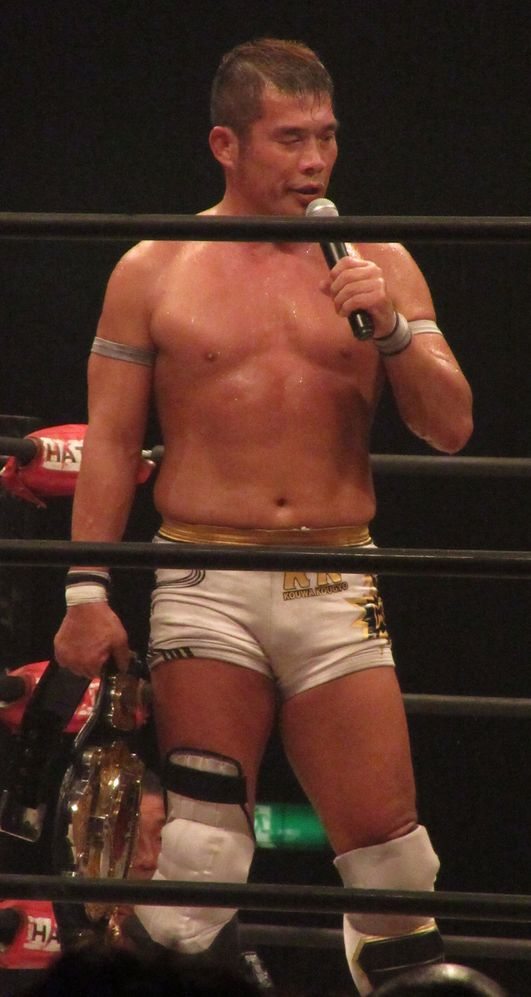

Personal information
- Born: January 17, 1970 (age 56) Kōtō, Tokyo
- Family: Mochizuki Jr. (son)

Professional wrestling career
- Ring name(s): Masaaki Mochizuki; BxB Masa
- Billed height: 1.75 m (5 ft 9 in)
- Billed weight: 85 kg (187 lb)
- Trained by: Kōji Kitao
- Debut: January 21, 1994

Masaaki Mochizuki (望月 成晃, Mochizuki Masaaki; born January 17, 1970) is a Japanese professional wrestler, He is currently working for All Japan Pro Wrestling (AJPW), Dragon Gate and Pro Wrestling Noah as a freelancer. Mochizuki is a former three-time Open the Dream Gate Champion and In NOAH former GHC National Champion and GHC Tag Team Champion. He is also known for his time in Full Impact Pro (FIP), where former one-time FIP World Heavyweight Champion.

== Professional wrestling career ==
=== Early years ===
A former karateka and graduate of Koji Kitao's Bukō Dōjō, Masaaki spent the early part of his career wrestling for various promotions across Japan, namely WAR and BattlARTS. Most notable was his appearance in the 1995 Super J-Cup, where he took on Shinjiro Otani of New Japan Pro-Wrestling in the first round. Despite losing, Masaaki looked very competitive, using his sharp kicks and quick submission holds to pose a serious threat to the more experienced Otani.

=== Toryumon ===
In late 1999, Masaaki joined Toryumon, Último Dragón's upstart promotion, and quickly became recognized as one of the three "aces" of the company, alongside Cima, and Magnum Tokyo. In April 2000, he formed the heel group M2K with Susumu Mochizuki (no relation), and Yasushi Kanda, the stable's name coming from their surnames. Darkness Dragon and Chocoball KOBE would join later in the year as well. The group wreaked havoc on Toryumon's initial El Numero Uno Tournament in 2001, forcing every group member's matches, except for Susumu's, to end in double-countouts. However, Masaaki won a second-chance battle royal to get back into the tournament. After defeating Cima via knockout in the semi-finals, he pinned Magnum Tokyo in the finals; his only pinfall victory of the whole tournament. His issue with both, namely Cima and his Crazy Max stable, would continue through the end of the year; such was M2K's chicanery that Crazy Max, the original renegade group of Toryumon, was turned face by default. After losing a hair vs. hair lumberjack match to Cima in December 2001, Mochizuki was humiliated into cleaning up M2K's act.

He returned in 2002, claiming to be a "good person", and made a conscious effort to rid M2K of its evil ways, something his stablemates would have none of; kicking him out of the group not long after. He got one back on them on February 24, though, when he beat Susumu for the rights to the Mochizuki surname, forcing Susumu to take on "Yokosuka" as his new surname.

He would then go on to lead the Toryumon Army with Dragon Kid and Ryo Saito throughout 2002. On January 23, 2003, he formed the much-maligned Shin M2K, and they lasted until December 16 when he lost to fellow member Kenichiro Arai in a match and was forced to disband the unit. At the beginning of 2004, he turned heel again to become leader of the Aagan Iisou stable. His time with them lasted a mere three months, when personality clashes between him and the other members resulted in him being kicked out. He turned face again and repented for his heel turn, and then on July 4, he and former M2K members from both generations banded with him to form Final M2K as Toryumon became Dragon Gate.

=== Dragon Gate ===
In December, he celebrated 10 years in wrestling by defeating Cima for Dragon Gate's top prize, the Open the Dream Gate Championship. He held the title for 11 months before losing it to Magnitude Kishiwada on November 4, 2005. When 2006 rolled around, he began to distance himself from Final M2K a bit, giving the reins of leadership to Susumu and joining up with Magnum Tokyo in his short-lived Renaissance project.

He also returned to the old WAR promotion, reviving their International Junior Heavyweight Title, which he lost to Pentagon Black on July 27. He won it back on November 23, but vacated it immediately after winning it. He beat Gedo in a decision match on January 26, 2007, to determine the final champion and then retired the title. He also teamed with fellow Renaissance member Don Fujii to win the revived WAR International Junior Heavyweight Tag Team Titles on August 6, 2006, beating Gamma & Dr. Muscle in a tournament final. They would hold the title until January 7, 2007, when they lost them to Jado and Gedo.

In December 2006, he won the 2nd King of Gate Tournament, beating last year's champion Ryo Saito in the finals. On January 14, 2007, the Final M2K stable came to an end, after he, Susumu & K-ness lost to Cima, Don Fujii and Matt Sydal of the also-ending Blood Generation. He then decided that he would not become part of another unit, instead continuing his team with Don Fujii, who also refused to join another unit.

In 2007, he hosted his first self-produced show, Buyuden. The show became a success, and it has since become a monthly show, with talent from different promotions in Japan participating. He - along with Don Fujii - was made the company ambassador to promotions within Japan while Cima spearheaded the company's international expansion. He also challenged for the Dream Gate Title twice, but when he failed to win it either time, he decided to continue to focus on outside efforts with Fujii.

Towards the end of the year, they united with K-ness to form Mushozoku, a team of wrestlers 35 years and older. On September 9, they won the Open the Triangle Gate Titles, defeating Naruki Doi, Masato Yoshino & Magnitude Kishiwada, and defended them right up until February 24, 2008, when they lost them to Shingo Takagi, BxB Hulk & Cyber Kong. K-ness stepped into a background role, and soon, the newly-face Magnitude Kishiwada took his place, forming Zetsurins. On September 28, the trio won the Open the Triangle Gate Titles from Yasushi Kanda, Yamato & Gamma. They made a defense against Kenichiro Arai, Akira Tozawa & Taku Iwasa of Tozawa-juku on November 16, and Tozawa added the stipulation that if his team lost, then Tozawa-juku would disband. Mochizuki scored the winning pinfall, bringing Tozawa-juku to an end.

Iwasa began a rivalry with him after swearing revenge on him for causing the end of Tozawa-juku. They faced off in a second round match in the King of Gate Tournament in December, where Mochizuki had promised that he would show Iwasa's one "fundamental flaw." Mochizuki won, and afterwards, he told Iwasa that his "fundamental flaw" was that he had been a tag team wrestler for so long that he had forgotten how to wrestle on his own, and would have to re-learn how. Mochizuki would get to the finals of the tournament, but lost to Naruki Doi. On February 15, 2009, he, Fujii & Kishiwada lost the Triangle Gate titles to Shingo Takagi, Taku Iwasa & Dragon Kid, where he took the fall, being pinned by Iwasa.

In August, he teamed with Katsuhiko Nakajima to participate in the annual Summer Adventure Tag League Tournament, and they made it to the finals, but they lost to Shingo Takagi & Yamato. Two months later, he would hold the Triangle Gate titles for a third time, teaming with Don Fujii & Akebono to beat Masato Yoshino, BxB Hulk & PAC.

After teaming with Anthony W. Mori against Takuya Sugawara & Minoru Fujita, Mori turned to Mochizuki and named him as the heir to the throne of Phillip J. Fukumasa. Mochi took the crown, and agreed the three would do the Royal Brothers (Anthony W. Mori, Henry III Sugawara, Phillip J. Mochizuki) on the first Buyuden after the generation war was over. On May 13, 2010, Mochizuki, Fujii and Akebono lost the Open the Triangle Gate Championship to Cima, Gamma and Genki Horiguchi. On January 10, 2011, Mochizuki and Fujii defeated Naruki Doi and Gamma to win the Open the Twin Gate Championship. They would lose the title to Genki Horiguchi and Ryo Saito on February 6, 2011.

On April 14, 2011, Mochizuki defeated Masato Yoshino to win the Open the Dream Gate Championship for the second time. On April 24 Mochizuki agreed to form a new alliance with former World-1 members Masato Yoshino, BxB Hulk, PAC and Susumu Yokosuka to battle the promotion's new top heel stable, Blood Warriors. On June 8, the new group was named Junction Three (JIII) in reference to it being a union between the former members of World-1, Kamikaze and the Veteran-gun. And Mochizuki led their team to winning all four Titles on June 19 in Champion Gate. At the end of 2011, Masaaki Mochizuki shared the Fighting Spirit award with Yuji Nagata from New Japan. After a ten-month rivalry, Blood Warriors defeated Junction Three in a fourteen-man elimination tag team match on February 9, 2012, forcing JIII to disband. After forming the Kaettekita Veteran-gun stable with some of Dragon Gate's veterans, Mochizuki and stablemate Don Fujii defeated Shingo Takagi and Yamato on September 23, 2012, to win the Open the Twin Gate Championship for the second time. On September 9, Masaaki Mochizuki took part in the Nagata's 20th anniversary, they defeat Kazuchika Okada, Shinsuke Nakamura and Yujiro Takahashi in the main event with Nagata and Jun Akiyama. From November 20 to December 1, Masaaki Mochizuki once again travelled to New Japan Pro-Wrestling. He and Nagata took part in the round-robin portion of the 2012 World Tag League, finishing with a record of four wins and two losses, narrowly missing advancing to the semifinals of the tournament.

In 2013, Mochizuki and teammate Don Fujii defeated the team Genki Horiguchi & Jimmy Kanda and team Naruki Doi and Ricochet at the beginning of the year, and they created the new defense record for Twin Gate so far. In February, Mochizuki took part in the Dragon Gate UK show from February 22 to 24. He defeated Yamato, Noam Dar and Naruki Doi in a raw and made his record from 0-2 to 3-2. While on March 2, 2013, Mochizuki and Fujii lost the Open the Twin Gate Championship to BxB Hulk and Uhaa Nation. Before the losing, they have defended 6 times and created the longest defense for the Twin Gate. On May 17, 2013, Mochizuki achieved his 2500th match in Kobe Sambo Hall in Kobe by beating K-ness, Jimmy Susumu and Jimmy Saito. After that he started the road to 3000th match by winning the Triangle Gate Champion with K-ness, Jimmy Susumu on June 5, 2013. In this match they appeared in M2K faction. However, they lost the title at Champion Gate on June 16, 2013. After Kaettekita Veteran-gun lost all the matches at Kobe World show, Mochizuki and K-Ness decided to align the two union and form the new union named Oretachi Veteran-gun. On August 19, 2013, Mochizuki and his teammates won the Triangle Gate Champion by beating Jimmys and it is the first title for the new union. On August 17, 2014, Mochizuki and Dragon Kid quit Oretachi Veteran-gun to form a new stable with BxB Hulk called Dia.HEARTS. On February 4, 2016, Dia.HEARTS was forced to disband after losing a match to Monster Express and VerserK. On September 18, 2017, Mochizuki defeated YAMATO at Dangerous Gate 2017 to become the Dream Gate Champion for the third time.

== Championships and accomplishments ==
- All Japan Pro Wrestling
  - Gaora TV Championship (1 time)
  - All Asia Tag Team Championship (1 time) – with Don Fujii
- Dragon Gate
  - Open the Dream Gate Championship (3 times)
  - Open the Twin Gate Championship (3 times) – with Don Fujii (2) and Takashi Yoshida (1)
  - Open the Owarai Gate Championship (2 times)
  - Open the Triangle Gate Championship (7 times) – with K-ness and Don Fujii (1), Don Fujii and Magnitude Kishiwada (1), Don Fujii & Akebono (1), and Jimmy Susumu and K-Ness (1), and Dragon Kid and K-Ness (1), and Big R Shimizu and Dragon Kid (1)
  - King of Gate (2006)
- Full Impact Pro
  - FIP World Heavyweight Championship (1 time)
- Ganbare☆Pro-Wrestling
  - Spirit of Ganbare World Openweight Championship (1 time)
- Michinoku Pro Wrestling
  - British Commonwealth Junior Heavyweight Championship (1 time)
- Osaka Pro Wrestling
  - Osaka Pro Wrestling Tag Team Championship (1 time) – with Don Fujii
  - Osaka Tag Festival (2010) – with Don Fujii
- Pro Wrestling Illustrated
  - Ranked No. 110 of the top 500 singles wrestlers in the PWI 500 in 2018
- Pro Wrestling Noah.
  - GHC National Championship (1 time)
  - GHC Tag Team Championship (1 time) – with Naomichi Marufuji
- Pro Wrestling Zero1-Max
  - Zero1 International Junior Heavyweight Championship (1 time)
- Tokyo Gurentai
  - Tokyo Intercontinental Tag Team Championship (1 time) – with Hikaru Sato
  - Tokyo World Heavyweight Championship (1 time)
- Tokyo Sports
  - Fighting Spirit Award (2011)
- Toryumon Japan
  - UWA World Trios Championship (2 times) – with Darkness Dragon and Susumu Mochizuki (1) and with Kenichiro Arai and Dragon Kid (1)
  - El Numero Uno (2001)
- Wrestle Association "R"
  - WAR International Junior Heavyweight Championship (3 times)
  - WAR International Junior Heavyweight Tag Team Championship (2 time) – with Battle Ranger and with Don Fujii
  - WAR World Six-Man Tag Team Championship (1 time) – with Nobukazu Hirai and Koji Kitao

=== Luchas de Apuestas record ===
Winner (wager)	Loser (wager)	Location	Event	Date	Notes
Masaaki Mochizuki (hair)	Magnum Tokyo (hair)	Osaka, Japan	Live event	September 30, 2001	(Note: Five-way steel cage match, which also included Cima, Darkness Dragon and Dragon Kid.)
Cima (hair)	Masaaki Mochizuki (hair)	Tokyo, Japan	Live event	December 10, 2001	(Note: Lumberjack match.)
