= Tatsuhito Takaiwa =

Zainichi Korean wrestler (born 1972)

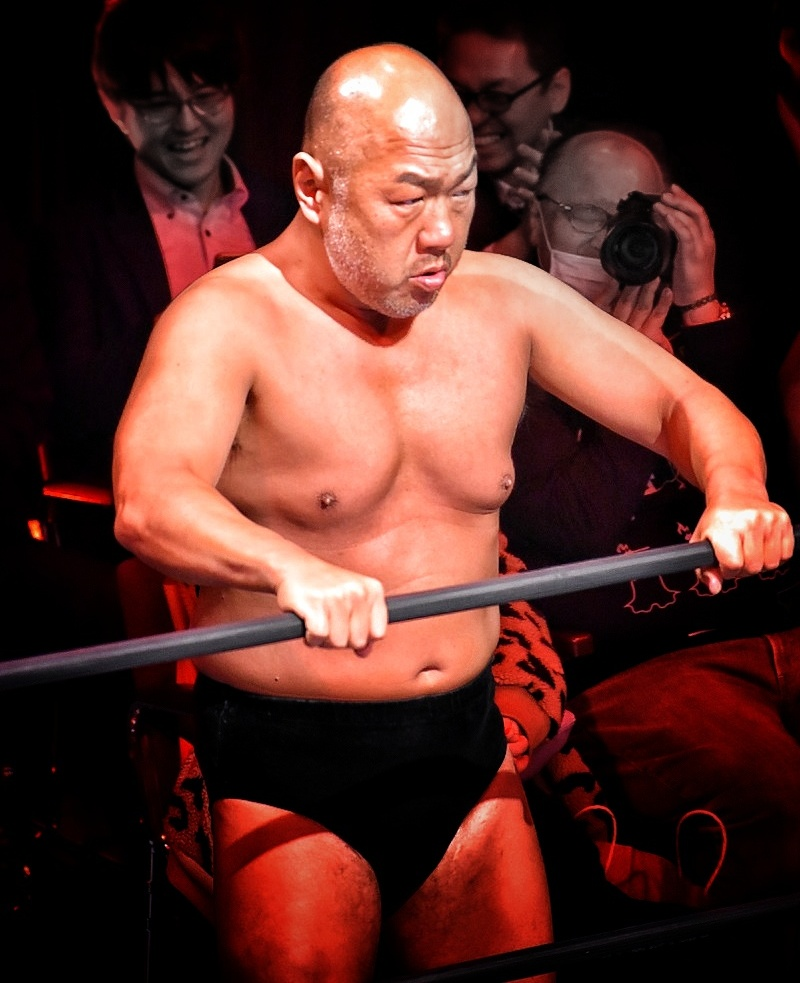
- Takaiwa in February 2020

Personal information
- Born: Go Yong-Il (고용일); July 5, 1972 (age 54) Kyoto, Japan

Professional wrestling career
- Ring name(s): Black Tiger (V); Tatsuhito Takaiwa
- Billed height: 1.78 m (5 ft 10 in)
- Billed weight: 97 kg (214 lb)
- Trained by: NJPW Dojo
- Debut: July 21, 1992

Tatsuhito Takaiwa (高岩竜一, Takaiwa Tatsuhito; born Go Yong-Il; Korean: 고용일; July 5, 1972) is a Korean-Japanese professional wrestler. He has wrestled for New Japan Pro-Wrestling (NJPW), Pro Wrestling Zero1, All Japan Pro Wrestling (AJPW), and Pro Wrestling Noah.

Known for his work as a tag team specialist, Takaiwa has won the IWGP Junior Heavyweight Tag Team Championship a number of times alongside Shinjiro Otani.

== Professional wrestling career ==
=== New Japan Pro-Wrestling (1992–2000) ===
While attending vocational school, Takaiwa passed the New Japan Pro-Wrestling (NJPW) entry exam and began training with the promotion in 1992. Takaiwa was part of the same trainee class as Shinjiro Otani and the two became frequent opponents and tag team partners when they eventually debuted. Takaiwa debuted on July 21, 1992, losing to Satoshi Kojima. In 1993, Takaiwa took part in the Young Lions Cup, finishing last with zero wins and zero points. During the early years of his career, Takaiwa primarily competed in opening matches, usually on the losing end as is customary for young wrestlers in Japan. Beginning in 1997, Takaiwa began to create more of a name for himself, competing in that year's Best of the Super Juniors tournament and finishing with four points. In 1998, Takaiwa teamed up with Otani to take part in the league to crown the inaugural IWGP Junior Heavyweight Tag Team Champions, with the two of them defeating Koji Kanemoto and Dr Wagner Jr in the finals to become the first ever holders of the belts. In December 1998, Takaiwa received his first shot at the IWGP Junior Heavyweight Championship, unsuccessfully challenging Jushin Thunder Liger. Days later on December 11, Takaiwa and Otani travelled to Wrestle Association R where they defeated Masaaki Mochizuki and Masao Orihara to win the vacant International Junior Heavyweight Tag Team Championship, making themselves double champions. Their days as double champions didn't last long, however, as they would lose the IWGP Junior Heavyweight Tag Team Championship to Kendo Kashin and Dr Wagner Jr at Wrestling World 1999. Later in the year they would regain the championships, defeating Jushin Thunder Liger and The Great Sasuke in July. In 2000, both Otani and Takaiwa took part in the Best of the Super Juniors tournament, with both men winning their blocks and reaching the final, where, on June 9, Takaiwa defeated Otani to win the 2000 Best of the Super Juniors. Later in the month after just under a year as champions, Otani and Takaiwa lost the IWGP Junior Heavyweight Tag Team Championships to the Junior Stars (Koji Kanemoto and Minoru Tanaka). After losing the titles, Takaiwa began focusing more on his singles career, winning the IWGP Junior Heavyweight Championship for the first time in his career in July, defeating Jushin Thunder Liger. Takaiwa eventually lost the championship to Minoru Tanaka in October.

=== Pro Wrestling Zero1 (2001–2020) ===
After Shinya Hashimoto was fired by New Japan Pro-Wrestling in November 2000, he and Shinjiro Otani went on to announce the formation of their own promotion, Pro Wrestling Zero1, and Takaiwa was one of the first wrestlers to sign with the promotion after its formation. At the promotion's first show on March 2, 2001, Takaiwa teamed with Alexander Otsuka in a loss to No Fear (Yoshihiro Takayama and Takao Omori). Rather than follow in Otani's footsteps and graduate to the heavyweight division, Takaiwa opted to remain a junior and spent Zero1's formative years building up the division. In 2004, Takaiwa took part in the Tenkaichi Junior Tournament, making it to the final where he defeated Tomohiro Ishii to win it. After winning the tournament, Takaiwa revealed to the fans in Korakuen Hall that he was actually Zainichi Korean, and said that while he was proud to be Korean, he was also proud to be able to say he was born and raised in Japan, which prompted loud cheers from the audience. On May 16, Takaiwa defeated Tony Stradlin to win the International Junior Heavyweight Championship. Shortly after, Takaiwa formed a tag team with Ishii, and the two defeated Leonardo Spanky and Low-Ki to win the NWA International Lightweight Tag Team Championship. Ishii and Takaiwa continued to defend the championships until September, when they were defeated by Spanky and Kaz Hayashi. Despite losing the tag team championships, Takaiwa continued to successfully defend the Junior Heavyweight Championship throughout 2004, defeating the likes of Minoru Fujita, Jun Kasai, Super Crazy and Spanky. On October 17, Takaiwa's match against Naohiro Hoshikawa was stopped early after Hoshikawa was legitimately knocked unconscious and fell into a coma after taking a powerbomb from the top of the cage by Takaiwa. Takaiwa would go on to hold the championship until December, when he was defeated by Super Crazy. On June 24, 2006, Takaiwa defeated Katsuhiko Nakajima to win the WWA World Junior Light Heavyweight Championship, and on July 27 defeated Takuya Sugawara to unify both the WWA and International Junior Heavyweight titles. In February 2007, while simultaneously holding the WWA, International and GHC Junior titles, Takaiwa beat Ikuto Hidaka to win the AWA World Junior Heavyweight Championship. After 7 years with the promotion, Takaiwa announced he was leaving Pro Wrestling Zero1 Max to become a freelancer on December 17, 2008.

=== Return to NJPW/Black Tiger (2008–present) ===
Takaiwa competed in his first Best of the Super Juniors tournament since 2000 in June 2008, finishing with four points and failing to advance. After going freelance in December 2008, Takaiwa debuted as the fifth Black Tiger on February 15, 2009, breaking the Black Tiger tradition of foreigners under the mask, by attacking Tiger Mask. On June 20, 2009, at Dominion 6.20 Tiger Mask defeated him in a mask vs. mask match and afterwards Takaiwa revealed his identity by removing his mask. Takaiwa lost his mask as Black Tiger V for the second time on May 14, 2011, when he was defeated at a Toryumon Mexico event by Último Dragón. Despite losing his mask twice, Takaiwa continues to make appearances as Black Tiger V.

=== Pro Wrestling Noah (2001–2007, 2011–2013) ===
Shortly after the formation of Zero1, Takaiwa also began making appearances in Pro Wrestling Noah, and in October 2001 defeated Yoshinobu Kanemaru to win the GHC Junior Heavyweight Championship. Takaiwa held on to the title until December, when he dropped it to Naomichi Marufuji. Takaiwa returned to Noah in 2003 to take part in the Differ Cup, a tag team tournament featuring junior heavyweights. Teaming with Zero1 trainee Yoshihito Sasaki, they made it to the finals where they were defeated by Toryumon representatives Ultimo Dragon and Yossino. On December 23, 2006, Takaiwa won the championship a second time, defeating Takashi Sugiura at a SEM event. He held the title until April 2007, dropping it to Mushiking Terry. Takaiwa returned to Noah again in 2011, taking part in the NTV G+ Cup Junior Heavyweight Tag League with his trainee Osamu Namiguchi. The two performed poorly, earning just two points and failing to advance. Takaiwa made another one-off return to Noah in December 2013, unsuccessfully challenging Taiji Ishimori for the GHC Junior title.

=== Freelancing (2009–present) ===
Originally aiming to step away from pro wrestling after leaving Zero1 and doing one last run in New Japan Pro-Wrestling, Takaiwa got a job at a building maintenance company in late 2009 and began competing more sparingly on the independent scene in early 2010, primarily working for Jun Kasai's Freedoms. He was also named head coach of Big Japan Pro Wrestling (BJW)'s dojo, and made occasional appearances in Kensuke Office as Black Tiger. Takaiwa left his second job in 2012 and returned to Zero1 for the first time in four years to take part in the Tenkaichi Junior Tournament, though he was unsuccessful, losing to Jonathan Gresham in the semi-final. In May 2013, he took part in Freedoms' tournament to crown the first ever King of Freedom World Champion, beating Keizo Matsuda, Brahman Shu, Minoru Fujita to reach the final where he lost to Takashi Sasaki. In March 2014 he partnered up with Sasaki in the King of Freedom Tag Title tournament. The two were successful and reached the final where they were unable to defeat Great Kojika and The Winger. In September, he took part in Zero1 and Noah's joint show, briefly reviving his old team with Shinjiro Otani to beat Akitoshi Saito and Masa Kitamiya. In September 2015, they reformed for good, and captured the NWA International Lightweight Tag Team Championship from Takuya Sugawara and Brother Yasshi. Otani and Takaiwa held the belts until April 2016, when they were defeated by Fujita "Jr." Hayato and Ikuto Hidaka. On March 26, 2017, Takaiwa officially re-signed with Zero1 after almost 8 years as a freelancer. In his return match, he was defeated by Shinjiro Otani. Takaiwa continues to make regular appearances in Zero1 to this day.

== Championships and accomplishments ==
- Apache Pro-Wrestling Army/Pro-Wrestling A-Team

- WEW Junior Heavyweight Championship (1 time)
- WEW Tag Team Championship (1 time) – with Tetsuhiro Kuroda

- Chō Sentō Puroresu FMW

- FMW World Street Fight 8-Man Tag Team Championship (1 time, current) – with Black Tiger VII, Great Tiger and Tiger Mask III Tigre en Mascarado

- DDT Pro-Wrestling

- Ganbare☆Martial Arts Open Tournament (2014)
- Top of the Dramatic Cruiser (2013)

- Ganbare☆Pro-Wrestling

- Spirit of Ganbare World Openweight Championship (1 time)
- Ganbare☆Climax (2021)

- New Japan Pro-Wrestling

- IWGP Junior Heavyweight Championship (1 time)
- IWGP Junior Heavyweight Tag Team Championship (2 times) – with Shinjiro Otani
- Best of the Super Juniors (2000)
- IWGP Junior Heavyweight Tag Team Title League (1998) - with Shinjiro Otani

- Pro Wrestling Illustrated
  - PWI ranked him #52 of the 500 best singles wrestlers in the PWI 500 in 2000
  - PWI ranked him #42 of the Top 100 Tag Teams of the "PWI Years" with Shinjiro Otani in 2003
- Pro Wrestling Noah

- GHC Junior Heavyweight Championship (2 times)

- Pro Wrestling Zero1

- AWA World Junior Heavyweight Championship (1 time)
- AWA/Zero1-Max/UPW/WORLD-1 International Junior Heavyweight Championship (1 time)
- NWA International Lightweight Tag Team Championship (3 times) – with Tomohiro Ishii (1) and Shinjiro Otani (2)
- NWA/UPW/Zero-One International Junior Heavyweight Championship (1 time)
- WWA World Junior Light Heavyweight Championship (Disputed Branch) (1 time)
- World-1 Junior Heavyweight Championship (1 time)
- Tenkaichi Junior (2004, 2008)

- Tenryu Project

- Tenryu Project International Junior Heavyweight Tag Team Championship (1 time) – with Masao Orihara

- Wrestle Association "R"

- WAR International Junior Heavyweight Tag Team Championship (1 time) – with Shinjiro Otani

- Wrestling Observer Newsletter awards

- Most Improved (1997)
- Tag Team of the Year (1998) with Shinjiro Otani

=== Luchas de Apuestas record ===
Winner (wager)	Loser (wager)	Location	Event	Date	Notes
Tiger Mask IV (mask)	Black Tiger (mask)	Osaka, Japan	Dominion 6.20	June 20, 2009	
Último Dragón (mask)	Black Tiger (mask)	Mexico City, Mexico	"Dragonmania VI"	May 14, 2011	

== Bibliography ==
- Lentz III, Harris M. (2003-01-01). Biographical Dictionary of Professional Wrestling. Lentz's Performing Arts Obituaries Series (2 ed.). McFarland. pp. 263, 346. ISBN 9780786417544.
