= Mizuki Watase =

Japanese professional wrestler (born 1991)

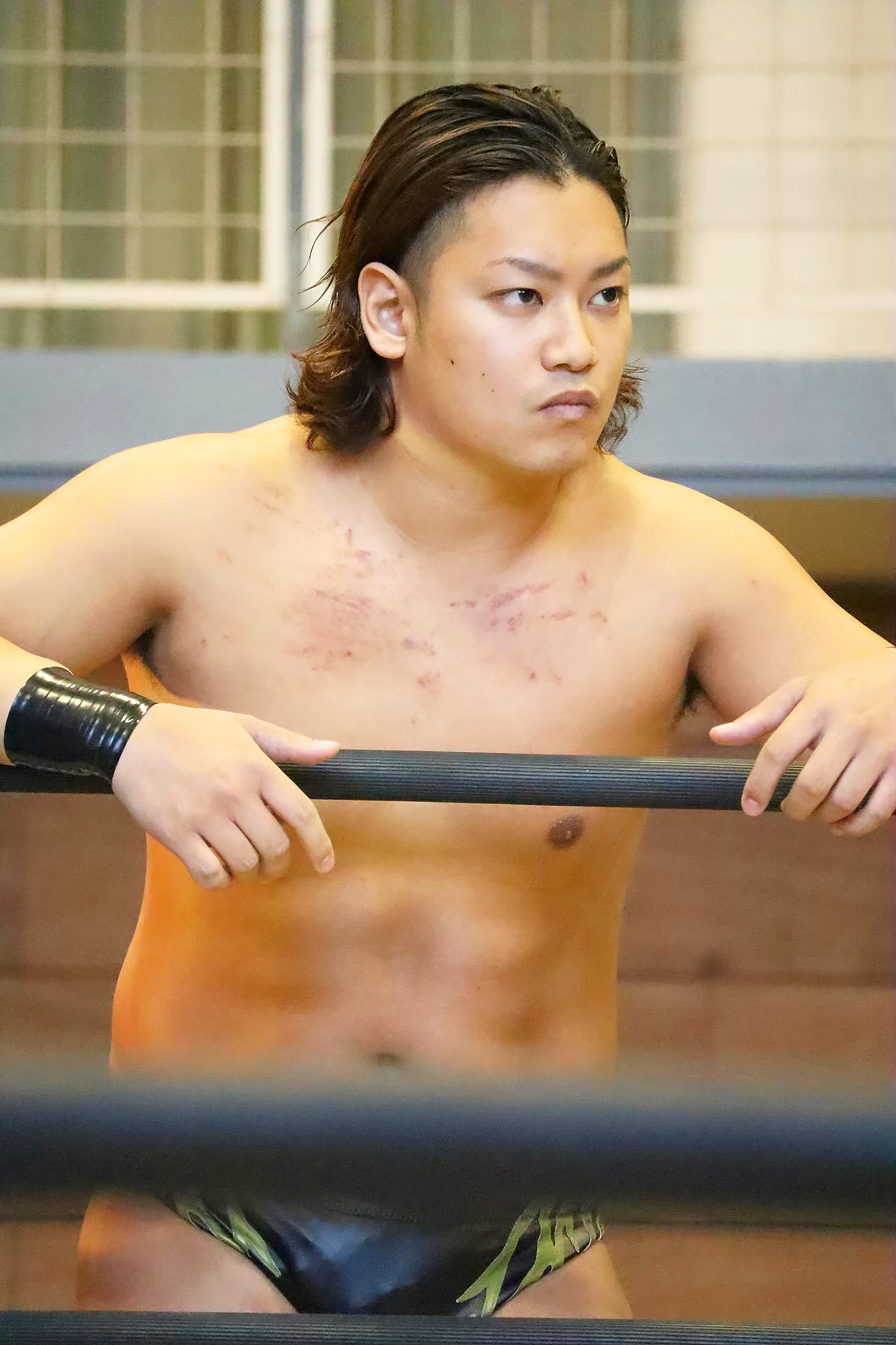
- Watase in July 2020

Personal information
- Born: February 6, 1991 (age 35) Yamanouchi, Japan

Professional wrestling career
- Ring name: Mizuki Watase
- Billed height: 176 cm (5 ft 9 in)
- Billed weight: 86 kg (190 lb)
- Trained by: Yasu Urano
- Debut: 2015

Mizuki Watase (渡瀬瑞基, Watase Mizuki) is a Japanese professional wrestler, currently working for the Japanese professional wrestling promotion DDT Pro-Wrestling (DDT) and Pro Wrestling Freedoms.

== Professional wrestling career ==
=== Independent circuit (2015–present) ===
Watase is known for his sporadic appearances in various promotions. At NOAH Great Voyage In Yokohama Vol. 2, an event promoted by Pro Wrestling Noah on December 16, 2018, he teamed up with Lin Dong Xuan to defeat Kinya Okada and Yoshiki Inamura. At AJPW GROWIN' UP Vol.2, an event promoted by All Japan Pro Wrestling on May 9, 2017, he teamed up with Soma Takao in a losing effort to Evolution (Atsushi Aoki and Hikaru Sato). Watase appeared in the United States Wrestling Promotion Game Changer Wrestling (GCW) in make Debut in September 2023.

==== DDT Pro Wrestling (2015–present) ====
Watase made his professional wrestling debut at Ryōgoku Peter Pan 2015, a signature event promoted by DDT Pro Wrestling which took place on August 23, where he teamed up with Kota Umeda and Mao Inoue, falling short to his trainer Yasu Urano, Akito and Ryota Nakatsu in a six-man tag team match. At DDT/Saki Akai Produce DDT Collection on March 14, 2018, he competed in a 27-man battle royal won by Kazuki Hirata who became general manager for one day, match which also involved other notable opponents such as Gorgeous Matsuno, Super Sasadango Machine, Yukio Sakaguchi, Konosuke Takeshita and Sanshiro Takagi.

As a matter of the DDT Peter Pan event, he also took part in the Ryōgoku Peter Pan 2016 from August 28, where he teamed up with Kouki Iwasaki in a losing effort to Kazusada Higuchi and Daiki Shimomura. Next year at Ryōgoku Peter Pan 2017 on August 20, he teamed up with Rekka, Diego and Daiki Shimomura to defeat Tomomitsu Matsunaga, Hoshitango, Nobuhiro Shimatani and Masato Kamino in an eight-man tag team match. At Ryōgoku Peter Pan 2018 on October 21, Watase teamed up with Jason "The Gift" Kincaid as The Renegades and unsuccessfully competed in a six-team gauntlet tag team match also involving the teams of Shuten-dōji (Kudo and Masahiro Takanashi) defeated Mike Bailey and Antonio Honda, Kazusada Higuchi and Kota Umeda, Tanomusaku Toba and Keisuke Okuda, and Tomomitsu Matsunaga and Michael Nakazawa. At Wrestle Peter Pan 2019 on July 15, he teamed up with All Out (Shunma Katsumata and Yuki Iino), picking up a victory against Disaster Box (Yuki Ueno and Naomi Yoshimura) and Nobuhiro Shimatani in a six-man tag team match. On the first night of the Wrestle Peter Pan 2020 event which took place on July 6, Watase teamed up with Jun Akiyama in a losing effort to All Out (Akito and Yuki Iino).

Another signature event promoted by DDT Pro Wrestling in which he participated is DDT Judgement. He marked his first appearance at Judgement 2016: DDT 19th Anniversary where he teamed up with LiLiCo and Kota Umeda to defeat Saki Akai, Makoto Oishi and Ladybeard by submission in a six-man tag team match. At Judgement 2017: DDT 20th Anniversary on March 20, where along with his Team DNA stablemates Kazusada Higuchi and Kouki Iwasaki dropped the KO-D 6-Man Tag Team Championship to NωA (Makoto Oishi, Shunma Katsumata and Mao) in a three-way match also involving Smile Squash (Soma Takao, Akito and Yasu Urano). At Judgement 2019: DDT 22nd Anniversary on February 17, he teamed up with Keisuke Ishii and Kota Umeda to defeat Danshoku Dino, Pokotan and Kudo in a six-man tag team match. At Judgement 2020: DDT 23rd Anniversary on March 20, Watase competed in a Battle royal for the Ironman Heavymetalweight Championship also involving the winner Kazuki Hirata, Danshoku Dino, Masahiro Takanashi, Hiroshi Yamato, Toru Owashi, Yukio Naya and Antonio Honda.

Watase also took part in various editions of the DDT Ultimate Party event. At Ultimate Party 2020 on November 3, he teamed up with Yukio Naya in a losing effort to Hiroshi Yamato and Hoshitango by submission.

At King of DDT Tournament 2020, Watase fell short to Toru Owashi in a first-round match of the competition from August 8.

== Championships and accomplishments ==
- DDT Pro-Wrestling
  - King of Dark Championship (1 time)
  - Ironman Heavymetalweight Championship (2 times - 1 with Antonio Honda, Danshoku Dino and Yukio Naya)
  - KO-D 6-Man Tag Team Championship (1 time) – with Kazusada Higuchi and Kouki Iwasaki
- Ganbare Pro-Wrestling
  - Spirit of Ganbare World Openweight Championship (2 time, current)
  - Spirit of Ganbare World Tag Team Championship (1 time) – with Shigehiro Irie
- Pro Wrestling Freedoms
  - King of Freedom World Tag Team Championship (1 time) – with Jun Kasai
  - Barefoot King Championship (1 time)
- Pro Wrestling Illustrated
  - Ranked No. 179 of the 500 best singles wrestlers in the PWI 500 in 2023
