= Shuichiro Katsumura =

Japanese mixed martial artist

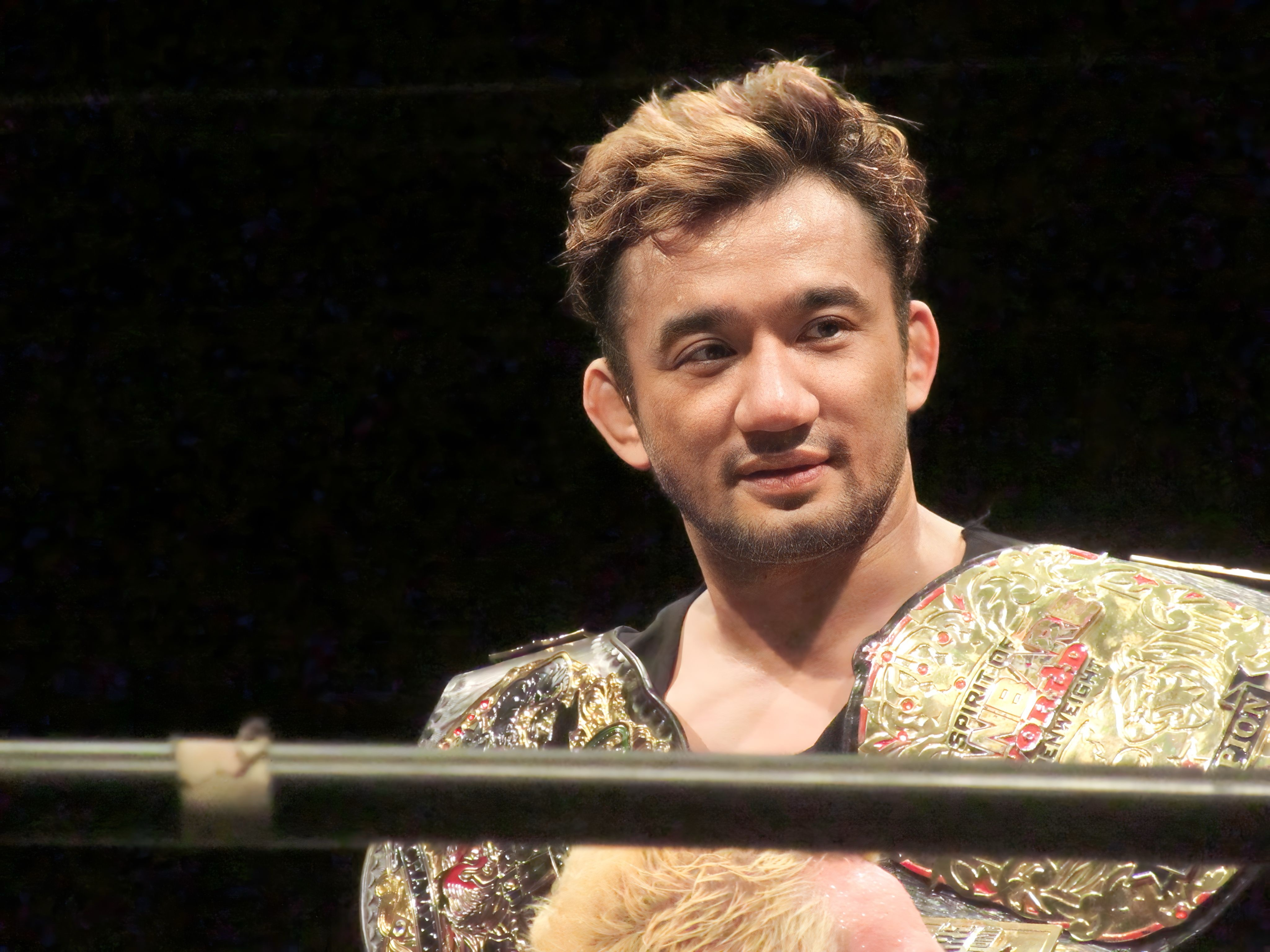
- Katsumura in January 2024
- Born: June 17, 1976 (age 50); Yokohama, Kanagawa, Japan
- Native name: 勝村周一朗
- Other names: Katsuzaki Shunosuke; "Real" Tiger Mask
- Nationality: Japanese
- Height: 5 ft 8 in (1.73 m)
- Weight: 132 lb (60 kg; 9.4 st)
- Division: Flyweight; Bantamweight; Featherweight
- Team: Reversal Gym Yokohama Ground Slam
- Years active: 1999 - 2011 (MMA)

Mixed martial arts record
- Total: 23
- Wins: 11
- By knockout: 1
- By submission: 8
- By decision: 2
- Losses: 9
- By knockout: 4
- By submission: 2
- By decision: 3
- Draws: 3

Other information
- Mixed martial arts record from Sherdog

Shuichiro Katsumura (勝村 周一朗, Katsumura Shūichirō; born June 17, 1976) is a Japanese former mixed martial artist and professional wrestler who currently competes for Ganbare Pro-Wrestling, where he was a Spirit of Ganbare World Openweight Champion and Spirit of Ganbare World Tag Team Champion. He competed in the Flyweight, Bantamweight and Featherweight divisions. Katsumura is credited in popularizing the "Ninja Choke" submission and is the current owner of ZST.

== Personal life ==
After graduating from university, he worked as an employee at a child care facility in Kamakura while continuing his martial arts training. This is where his nickname "Real Tiger Mask" comes from.

== Mixed martial arts record ==
Professional record breakdown
| 23 matches | 11 wins | 9 losses |
| By knockout | 1 | 4 |
| By submission | 8 | 2 |
| By decision | 2 | 3 |
| Draws | 3 | |

| Res. | Record | Opponent | Method | Event | Date | Round | Time | Location | Notes |
|---|---|---|---|---|---|---|---|---|---|
| Loss | 11-9-3 | Koetsu Okazaki | TKO (Punches) | Shooto: Shooto Tradition 2011 | April 29, 2011 | 2 | 2:24 | Tokyo, Japan | |
| Loss | 11-8-3 | Darren Uyenoyama | TKO (Punches) | Shooto: The Way of Shooto 5: Like a Tiger, Like a Dragon | September 23, 2010 | 2 | 3:53 | Tokyo, Japan | |
| Win | 11-7-3 | Masakatsu Ueda | Submission (Ninja Choke) | Shooto: The Way of Shooto 2: Like a Tiger, Like a Dragon | March 22, 2010 | 2 | 3:39 | Tokyo, Japan | |
| Win | 10-7-3 | So Tazawa | Submission (D'Arce Choke) | Shooto: Revolutionary Exchanges 3 | November 23, 2009 | 1 | 3:54 | Tokyo, Japan | |
| Win | 9-7-3 | Hiroyuki Yamashiro | Submission (Twister) | Zst: Zst 20 | May 24, 2009 | 1 | 2:56 | Tokyo, Japan | |
| Loss | 8-7-3 | Alexandre Franca Nogueira | KO (Punch) | K-1 HERO's: Middleweight Tournament Opening Round | July 16, 2007 | 2 | 1:55 | Yokohama, Japan | |
| Loss | 8-6-3 | Katsuhiko Nagata | TKO (Punches) | K-1: Premium 2006 Dynamite!! | December 31, 2006 | 1 | 4:12 | Osaka, Japan | |
| Draw | 8-5-3 | Kentaro Imaizumi | Draw | Zst: Zst 11 | November 23, 2006 | 2 | 5:00 | Tokyo, Japan | |
| Win | 8-5-2 | Artemij Sitenkov | Submission (Choke) | Shooto Lithuania: Bushido | April 23, 2006 | 1 | 2:29 | Vilnius, Lithuania | |
| Draw | 7-5-2 | Kenichi Osawa | Draw | Zst: Zst 9 | February 18, 2006 | 3 | 3:00 | Tokyo, Japan | |
| Win | 7-5-1 | Kit Kieu | Submission (Armbar) | Zst: Zst 8 | November 23, 2005 | 1 | 4:21 | Tokyo, Japan | |
| Win | 6-5-1 | Sergej Juskevic | Technical Submission (Omoplata) | Zst: Battle Hazard 2 | September 10, 2005 | 1 | 2:51 | Tokyo, Japan | |
| Loss | 5-5-1 | Hideo Tokoro | Technical Submission (Guillotine Choke) | Zst: Grand Prix 2 Opening Round | November 3, 2004 | 1 | 0:38 | Tokyo, Japan | |
| Loss | 5-4-1 | Marcos Galvao | Decision (Unanimous) | Shooto 2004: 1/24 in Korakuen Hall | January 24, 2004 | 3 | 5:00 | Tokyo, Japan | |
| Win | 5-3-1 | Eugenij Konkov | Submission (Rear-Naked Choke) | Shooto: Wanna Shooto 2003 | November 3, 2003 | 1 | 2:48 | Tokyo, Japan | |
| Loss | 4-3-1 | Kentaro Imaizumi | Decision (Unanimous) | Shooto: 2/23 in Korakuen Hall | February 23, 2003 | 3 | 5:00 | Tokyo, Japan | |
| Win | 4-2-1 | Alfonso Alcarez | Technical Submission (Triangle Choke) | Shooto: Treasure Hunt 11 | November 15, 2002 | 2 | 3:04 | Tokyo, Japan | |
| Draw | 3-2-1 | Kentaro Imaizumi | Draw | Shooto: Wanna Shooto 2002 | April 14, 2002 | 2 | 5:00 | Setagaya, Tokyo, Japan | |
| Win | 3-2 | Ryan Diaz | Decision (Unanimous) | Shooto: Wanna Shooto 2001 | April 8, 2001 | 2 | 5:00 | Setagaya, Tokyo, Japan | |
| Loss | 2-2 | Hiroaki Yoshioka | Submission (Armbar) | Shooto: R.E.A.D. 7 | July 22, 2000 | 2 | 3:43 | Setagaya, Tokyo, Japan | |
| Win | 2-1 | Takeyasu Hirono | TKO (Cut) | Shooto: R.E.A.D. 4 | April 12, 2000 | 1 | 4:17 | Setagaya, Tokyo, Japan | |
| Loss | 1-1 | Mamoru Yamaguchi | Decision (Unanimous) | Shooto: Renaxis 2 | July 16, 1999 | 2 | 5:00 | Tokyo, Japan | |
| Win | 1-0 | Masaki Nishizawa | Decision (Unanimous) | Shooto: Gig '99 | April 9, 1999 | 2 | 5:00 | Tokyo, Japan | |

== Championships and accomplishments ==
=== Mixed martial arts ===
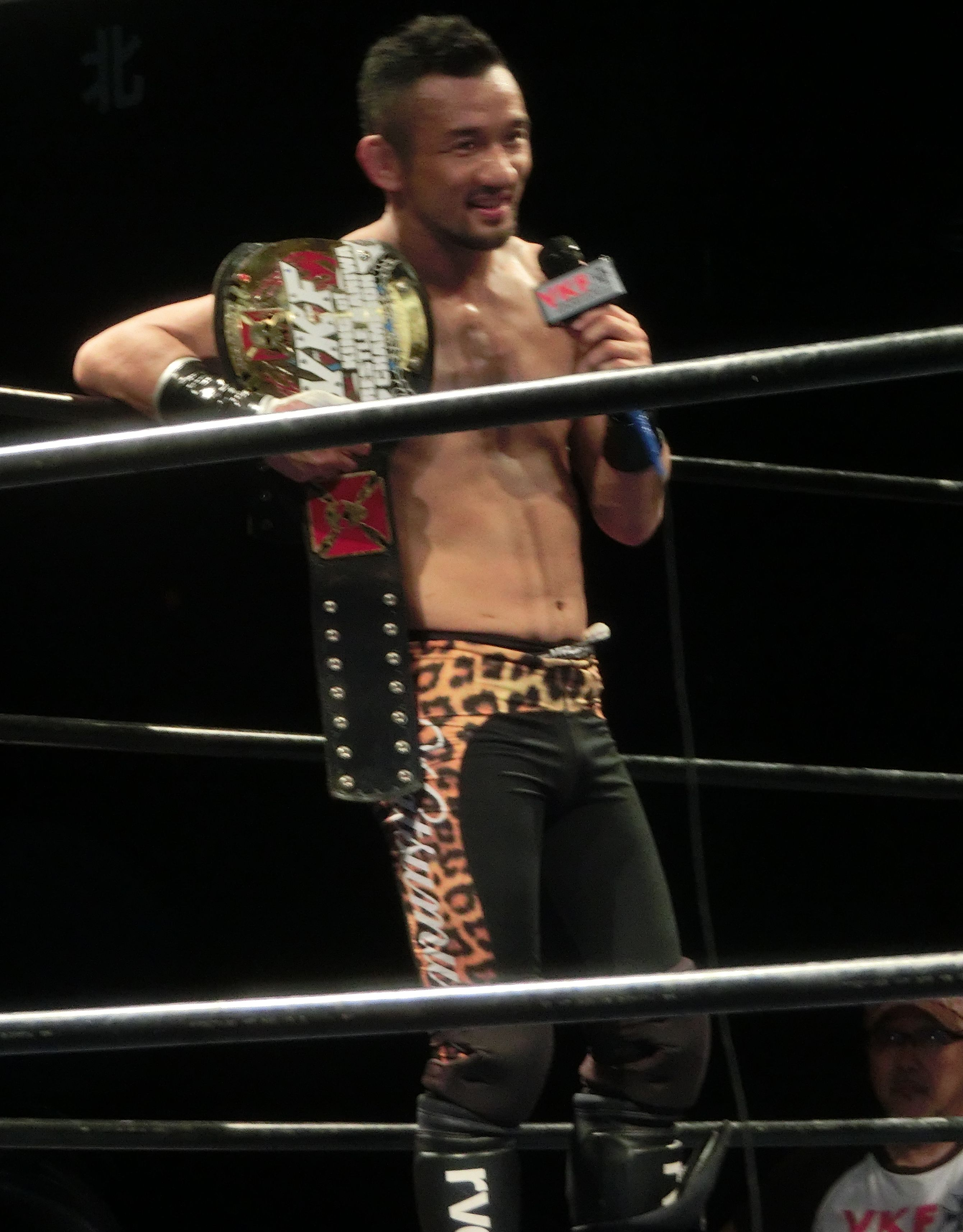
Katsumura is a former Shooto Featherweight Chanpion

- Shooto

- Shooto Featherweight Championship (1 time)
- All Japan Amateur Shooto Featherweight Champion tournament winner (1998)

=== Submission wrestling ===
- Sambo
  - Command Sambo 60 kg class champion (1997)

=== Professional wrestling ===
- DDT Pro-Wrestling

- GWC 6-Man Tag Team Championship (2 times) – with Moehiko Harumisawa and Shu Sakurai (2)
- Independent World Junior Heavyweight Championship (1 time)

- Ganbare☆Pro-Wrestling

- Spirit of Ganbare World Openweight Championship (1 time)
- Spirit of Ganbare World Tag Team Championship (2 times, current) – with Takuya Wada (1) and Yuya Susumu

- Pro-Wrestling Basara

- Iron Fist Tag Tournament (2026) – with Daiki Shimomura

- Theater Pro-Wrestling

- Fūryūjin Tag Team Championship (1 time) – with Sho Karasawa

- VKF Pro-Wrestling

- VKF King of Wrestle Naniwa Champion (1 time)

== See also ==
- List of male mixed martial artists
