= Ken Ohka =

Japanese professional wrestler

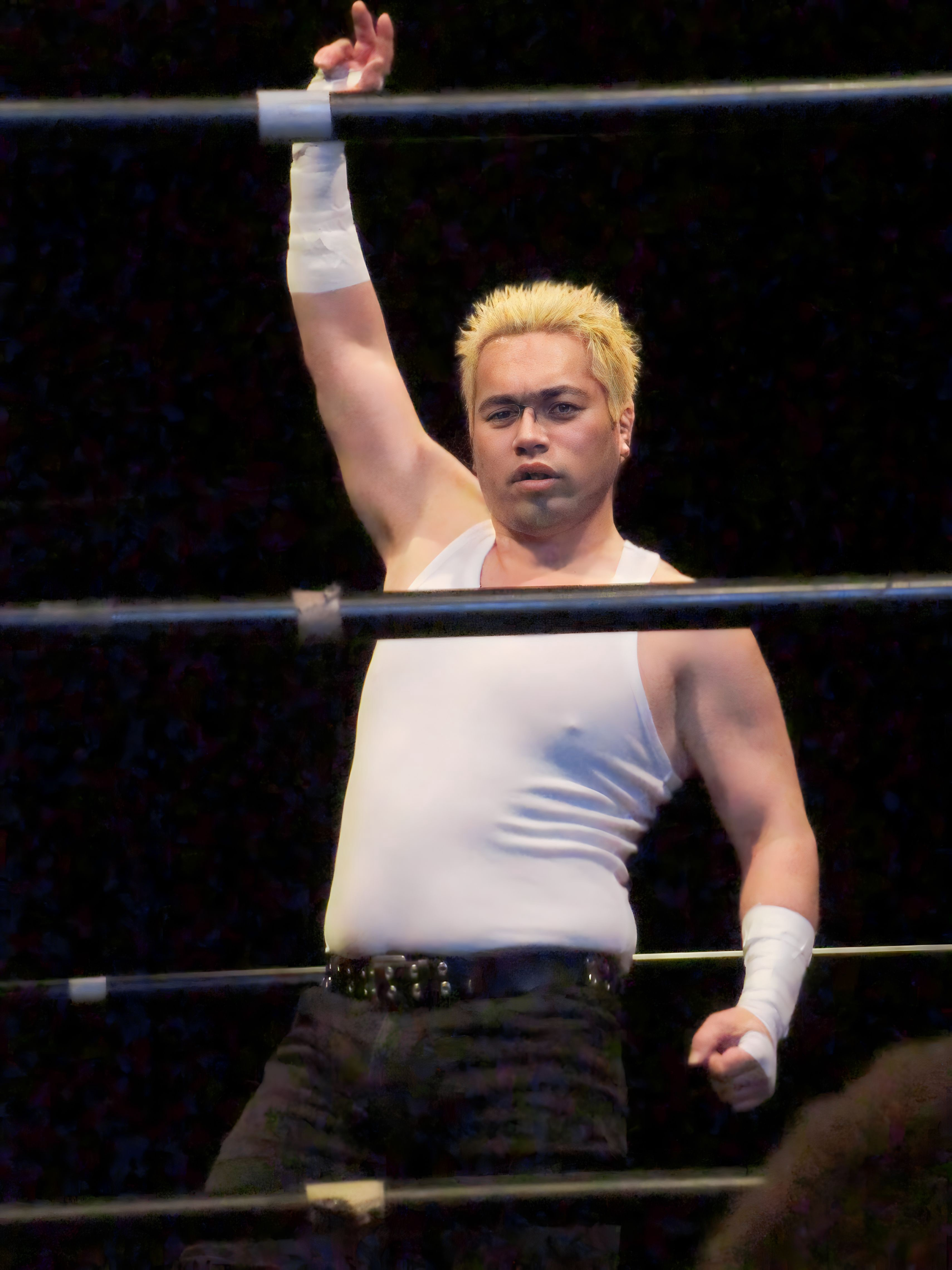
- Ohka in January 2024

Personal information
- Born: April 8, 1977 (age 49) Nanto, Toyama, Japan

Professional wrestling career
- Ring name(s): Kenny Ohka; Kenjiro Ohka; O.K. Revolution; Shishio; Shishio Shadow; Ken Ohka
- Billed height: 1.71 m (5 ft 7 in)
- Billed weight: 95 kg (209 lb)
- Trained by: Último Dragón
- Debut: 2001

Ken Ohka (大家健, Ōka Ken) is a Japanese professional wrestler currently working for the Japanese professional wrestling promotion DDT Pro-Wrestling (DDT).

== Professional wrestling career ==
=== Dramatic Dream Team (2001–present) ===
Ohka made his professional wrestling debut on Dramatic Dream Team promotion's International Youth Festival ~ DDT Charity Pro Wrestling Evening Show ~ on October 13, 2001, in an exhibition match in a losing effort against Takashi Sasaki. He is a former multiple time Ironman Heavymetalweight Champion, last time challenging Futoshi Miwa for it at DDT D-Day on April 5, 2003, under the name of O.K. Revolution. Ohka won the KO-D Openweight Championship, DDT's most prestigious title on June 28, 2015, at King of DDT 2015 Tokyo in a three-way match against the champion Kudo and Yasu Urano. He led the #OhkaEmpire stable, in which he wrestled alongside Danshoku Dino and Super Sasadango Machine, members with which he hosted a custom-made show, the DDT #OhkaEmpire Produce "Muscle Mates 2015" on November 17, where he worked with personalities such as Hiroshi Tanahashi, Yohei Komatsu and Harashima. On September 27, 2015, at the "Who's Gonna Top?" event, Ohka teamed up with fellow stable mates Danshoku Dino and Super Sasadango Machine to defeat Team Dream Futures (Keisuke Ishii, Shigehiro Irie and Soma Takao) for the KO-D 6-Man Tag Team Championship. On July 7, 2016, he teamed up with Kai as Bad Comis to win the KO-D Tag Team Championship from Daisuke Sasaki and Shuji Ishikawa. He captured the KO-D 8-Man Tag Team Championship (by the time it was the Ten-Man Tag Team Championship) after teaming up with Makoto Oishi, LiLiCo, Ladybeard and Super Sasadango Machine on August 20 at Ryōgoku Peter Pan 2017 by defeating T2Hii (Toru Owashi and Kazuki Hirata), Joey Ryan, Saki Akai and Yoshihiko in a ten-person intergender tag team match to become the inaugural champions.

=== Independent circuit (2006–present) ===
Ohka is known for tenures with various professional wrestling promotions. On March 18, 2017, Ohka defeated Shiori Asahi to win the Independent Junior Heavyweight Championship at K-DOJO Club-K Super In Blue Field, event promoted by Kaientai Dojo. He worked a match for New Japan Pro-Wrestling at the NJPW NEVER.6 ~ Road To The Super Junior Tournament on April 16, 2011, where he teamed up with Kaji Tomato, Marines Mask and Osamu Namiguchi in a losing effort to Gedo, Jado, Tetsuya Naito and Yujiro Takahashi of Chaos.

== Personal life ==
Ohka attended courses at the Nihon University in Tokyo.

== Championships and accomplishments ==
- Dramatic Dream Team/DDT Pro-Wrestling

- KO-D Openweight Championship (1 time)
- KO-D Tag Team Championship (1 time) – with Kai
- KO-D 6-Man Tag Team Championship (1 time) – with Danshoku Dino and Super Sasadango Machine
- KO-D 10-Man Tag Team Championship (1 time) – with Makoto Oishi, LiLiCo, Ladybeard and Super Sasadango Machine
- Ironman Heavymetalweight Championship (9 times)
- GWC 6-Man Tag Team Championship (2 times) – with Miss Mongol and Yumehito Imanari
- Independent World Junior Heavyweight Championship (2 times)
- Sea Of Japan 6-Person Tag Team Championship (1 time) – with Mr. Strawberry and Yoshihiro Sakai
- Uchicomi! Openweight Ultimate Championship (1 time)
- Ganbare☆Climax (2017)

- STYLE-E Pro Wrestling

- STYLE-E Openweight Championship (1 time)
- STYLE-E Tag Team Championship (1 time) – with Ganbee Takanashi
- SE Tag Team Tournament (2011) – with Ganbee Takanashi
