= International Lightweight Tag Team Championship (Zero1) =

Professional wrestling tag team championship

Details
- Promotion: Pro Wrestling Zero1
- Date established: December 26, 2003
- Current champions: Naruki Doi and Takuya Sugawara
- Date won: November 7, 2026

Other name
- NWA International Lightweight Tag Team Championship
Statistics
- First champions: Ikuto Hidaka and Dick Togo
- Most reigns: As tag team: Takuya Sugawara and "brother" Yasshi, Isami Kodaka and Takumi Tsukamoto, and Shinjiro Otani and Tatsuhito Takaiwa (2 reigns); As individual: Takuya Sugawara (8 reigns)
- Longest reign: Ikuto Hidaka and Munenori Sawa (766 days)
- Shortest reign: Shinjiro Otani and Tatsuhito Takaiwa (9 days)

The International Lightweight Tag Team Championship is a professional wrestling tag team championship in Japanese promotion Pro Wrestling Zero1, contested exclusively among junior heavyweight (referred to by Zero1 as "lightweights", <100 kg (220 lb)) wrestlers. It was created as the NWA International Lightweight Tag Team Championship on December 26, 2003 when Ikuto Hidaka and Dick Togo defeated Naohiro Hoshikawa and Tatsuhito Takaiwa in a tournament final. This was during a time when Zero1 (then known as Pro Wrestling Zero-One) was a member of the National Wrestling Alliance (NWA); since Zero1 departed the NWA in late 2004, NWA did not recognize or sanction it, though it retained the NWA initials. The NWA began sanctioning the title again when Zero1 rejoined the NWA in 2011. Following Zero1's departure from the NWA that same year, NWA ceased sanctioning the title and the NWA initials were dropped. The championship was retired on December 25, 2020 and revived on April 3, 2026. During its existence it was one of two tag team titles in Zero1, along with the NWA Intercontinental Tag Team Championship, a championship typically contested among heavyweights. There are a total of 39 recognized individual champions and 28 recognized teams, who had a combined 31 official reigns.

== Title history ==
Key
No.	Overall reign number
Reign	Reign number for the specific team—reign numbers for the individuals are in parentheses, if different
Days	Number of days held
Defenses	Number of successful defenses
<1	Reign lasted less than a day
+	Current reign is changing daily

No.	Champion	Championship change			Reign statistics			Notes	Ref.
No.	Champion	Date	Event	Location	Reign	Days	Defenses	Notes	Ref.
(NWA) National Wrestling Alliance / Pro Wrestling Zero-One (Zero-One)
1	Ikuto Hidaka and Dick Togo	December 26, 2003	Rebel Z Tour	Tokyo, Japan	1	55	2	Defeated Tatsuhito Takaiwa and Naohiro Hoshikawa in a tournament final.	
2	Low Ki and Leonardo Spanky	February 19, 2004	Embers Tour	Tokyo, Japan	1	106	2		
3	Tomohiro Ishii and Tatsuhito Takaiwa	June 4, 2004	Ambitious Tour	Hachinohe, Japan	1	107	1		
Pro Wrestling Zero-One (Zero-One)
4	Kaz Hayashi and Leonardo Spanky	September 19, 2004	New Whirlpool-1 Truth Tour	Tokyo, Japan	1 (1, 2)	162	0		
Pro Wrestling Zero1-Max (Zero1-Max)
—	Vacated	February 28, 2005	—	—	—	—	—	Vacated due to a lack of title defenses.	
5	Ikuto Hidaka and Minoru Fujita	March 27, 2005	Shippu Jinrai Tour	Tokyo, Japan	1 (2, 1)	516	9	Defeated Leonardo Spanky and Alex Shelley.	
6	Motor City Machine Guns (Chris Sabin and Alex Shelley)	August 25, 2006	Tenkaichi Junior	Tokyo, Japan	1	590	3		
7	Minoru Fujita and Takuya Sugawara	April 6, 2008	Miracle Rocket ~2nd Impact~	Tokyo, Japan	1 (2, 1)	119	1	This was also for Fujita and Sugawara's NWA Intercontinental Tag Team Championship.	
8	Ikuto Hidaka and Munenori Sawa	August 3, 2008	Fire Festival Tour	Tokyo, Japan	1 (3, 1)	766	8		
Pro Wrestling Zero1 (Zero1)
9	Takuya Sugawara and Kaijin Habu Otoko	September 8, 2010	Euro Vintage Action Tour	Tokyo, Japan	1 (2, 1)	333	4		
(NWA) National Wrestling Alliance / Pro Wrestling Zero1 (Zero1)
10	Ikuto Hidaka and Takafumi Ito	August 7, 2011	Fire Festival Tour	Tokyo, Japan	1 (4, 1)	178	1		
11	Takuya Sugawara and Tsuyoshi Kikuchi	February 1, 2012	Zero1 Action	Tokyo, Japan	1 (3, 1)	29 – 59	0		
—	Vacated	March 2012	—	—	—	—	—		
12	Jimmyz (Jimmy Susumu and Jimmy Kagetora)	April 24, 2012	Zero1 Over the Rainbow	Tokyo, Japan	1	124	2	Defeated the teams of Ikuto Hidaka and Craig Classic, and Takuya Sugawara and Mineo Fujita in a three-way match.	
13	Takuya Sugawara and Mineo Fujita	August 26, 2012	Yokohama Big Fireworks	Yokohama, Japan	1 (4, 1)	22	0		
14	Shawn Guinness and Frank David	September 17, 2012	Tenkaichi Junior	Tokyo, Japan	1	556	1		
Pro Wrestling Zero1 (Zero1)
—	Vacated	March 27, 2014	—	—	—	—	—	Vacated when David was unable to return to Japan for a title defense.	
15	Billyken Kid and Tigers Mask	March 30, 2014	11th Yasukuni Shrine Festival	Tokyo, Japan	1	173	1	Defeated the teams of Ikuto Hidaka and Fujita "Jr." Hayato, and Mineo Fujita and Jason Lee, in a three-way match. Tigers Mask wrestled as Atsushi Maruyama after April 22, 2014.	
16	Voodoo Murders (Takuya Sugawara and "brother" Yasshi)	September 19, 2014	Tenkaichi Special	Tokyo, Japan	1 (5, 1)	49	1		
17	Shuji Kondo and Seiki Yoshioka	November 7, 2014	Kassen: Battle Zero1 vs. W1 Tour	Tokyo, Japan	1	114	1		
18	Voodoo Murders (Takuya Sugawara and "brother" Yasshi)	March 1, 2015	Zero1_Fourteen	Tokyo, Japan	2 (6, 2)	206	2		
19	Shinjiro Otani and Tatsuhito Takaiwa	September 23, 2015	Go for Broke!	Tokyo, Japan	1 (1, 2)	197	4		
20	Dangan Yankees (Ikuto Hidaka and Fujita "Jr." Hayato)	April 7, 2016	N/A	Tokyo, Japan	1 (5, 1)	237	1		
21	Isami Kodaka and Takumi Tsukamoto	November 30, 2016	Basara Common Destiny	Tokyo, Japan	1	39	2		
22	Cavalry (Ryuichi Sekine and Ryota Nakatsu)	January 8, 2017	Basara Osaka Winter in Oyodo	Osaka, Japan	1	35	1		
23	Isami Kodaka and Takumi Tsukamoto	February 12, 2017	Basara Tenka Fubu	Nagoya, Japan	2	18	0		
24	Junior Saints (Koji Kanemoto and Minoru Tanaka)	March 2, 2017	New Zero1 Dream Series Birth of Team	Tokyo, Japan	1	71	2		
25	Shinjiro Otani and Tatsuhito Takaiwa	May 12, 2017	First Ever! Bob Sapp Current Blast!	Nagoya, Japan	2 (2, 3)	9	0		
26	Ikuto Hidaka and Takuya Sugawara	May 21, 2017	Shinsei Zero1 Dream Series: Growth	Tokyo, Japan	1 (6, 7)	225	4		
27	Masamune and Sugi	January 1, 2018	Kinga Shinnen	Tokyo, Japan	1	159	1		
28	Fuminori Abe and Ikuto Hidaka	June 9, 2018	Dream Series Tour	Tokyo, Japan	1 (1, 7)	311	3		
29	Kubota Brothers (Yasu Kubota and Hide Kubota)	April 16, 2019	Jump Up: Fly to the Future	Tokyo, Japan	1	166	2		
30	Billyken Kid and Hub	September 29, 2019	Jump Up: Fly to the Future	Osaka, Japan	1 (2, 2)	371	0	Hub previously held the title as Kaijin Habu Otoko.	
31	Sugi and Raicho	October 4, 2020	20th Anniversary Flame Festival: Fire Festival 2020	Osaka, Japan	1 (2, 1)	82	0		
—	Deactivated	December 25, 2020	—	—	—	—	—	Vacated when Sugi and Raicho left the promotion; title abandoned.	
32	Van Vert Jack and Yuki Toki	April 3, 2026	25th Anniversary Show	Tokyo, Japan	1	218	1	Defeated Brian Ishizaka and Takuya Sugawara to win the reactivated titles.	
33	Naruki Doi and Takuya Sugawara	November 7, 2026	Zero1	Tokyo, Japan	1 (1, 8)	4+	0		

== Combined reigns ==
As of November 11, 2026.

=== By team ===
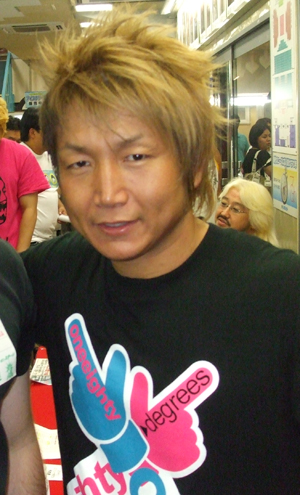
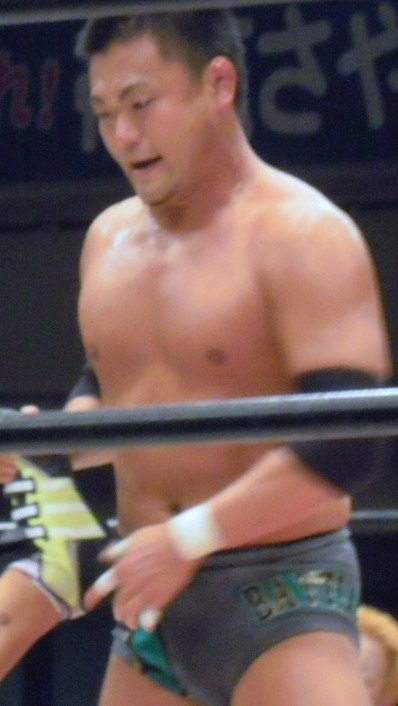
Record longest reigning champions at 766 days, Ikuto Hidaka and Munenori Sawa

†	Indicates the current champion

Rank	Team	No. of reigns	Combined defenses	Combined days
1	Ikuto Hidaka and Munenori Sawa	1	8	766
2	Motor City Machine Guns (Chris Sabin and Alex Shelley)	1	3	590
3	Shawn Guinness and Frank David	1	1	556
4	Ikuto Hidaka and Minoru Fujita	1	9	516
5	Billy Ken Kid and HUB	1	0	371
6	Takuya Sugawara and Kaijin Habu Otoko	1	4	333
7	Fuminori Abe and Ikuto Hidaka	1	3	311
8	Voodoo Murders (Takuya Sugawara and "brother" Yasshi)	2	3	255
9	Ikuto Hidaka and Fujita "Jr." Hayato	1	1	237
10	Ikuto Hidaka and Takuya Sugawara	1	4	225
11	Shinjiro Otani and Tatsuhito Takaiwa	2	4	206
12	Van Vert Jack and Yuki Toki	1	1	218
13	Ikuto Hidaka and Takafumi Ito	1	1	178
14	Billy Ken Kid and Tigers Mask	1	1	173
15	Kubota Brothers (Yasu Kubota and Hide Kubota)	1	2	166
16	Kaz Hayashi and Leonardo Spanky	1	0	162
17	Masamune and Sugi	1	1	159
18	Jimmyz (Jimmy Susumu and Jimmy Kagetora)	1	2	124
19	Minoru Fujita and Takuya Sugawara	1	1	119
20	Shuji Kondo and Seiki Yoshioka	1	1	114
21	Tomohiro Ishii and Tatsuhito Takaiwa	1	1	107
22	Low Ki and Leonardo Spanky	1	2	106
23	Sugi and Raicho	1	0	82
24	Junior Saints (Koji Kanemoto and Minoru Tanaka)	1	2	71
25	Isami Kodaka and Takumi Tsukamoto	2	2	57
26	Ikuto Hidaka and Dick Togo	1	2	55
27	Cavalry (Ryuichi Sekine and Ryota Nakatsu)	1	1	35
28	Takuya Sugawara and Tsuyoshi Kikuchi	1	0	29-59
29	Takuya Sugawara and Mineo Fujita	1	0	22
30	Naruki Doi and Takuya Sugawara †	1	0	4+

=== By individual ===
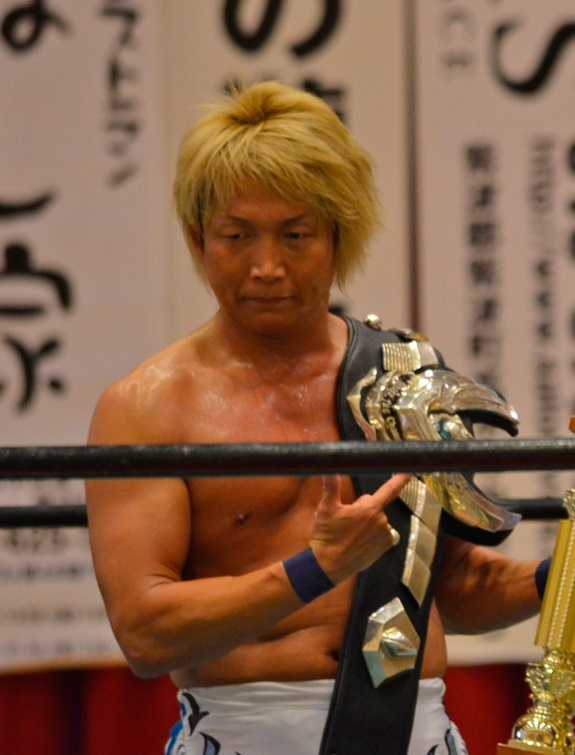
Record most reigns at seven(tied with Takuya Sugawara) and longest reigning (with partner Munenori Sawa) as well as combined reigning champion Ikuto Hidaka

†	Indicates the current champion

Rank	Wrestler	No. of reigns	Combined days
1	Ikuto Hidaka	7	2,288
4	Takuya Sugawara †	8	977+
5	Munenori Sawa	1	766
6	Kaijin Habu Otoko/HUB	2	704
7	Minoru Fujita	2	635
8	Alex Shelley	1	590
8	Chris Sabin	1	590
10	Frank David	1	556
10	Shawn Guinness	1	556
12	Billyken Kid	2	371
13	Tatsuhito Takaiwa	3	313
14	Fuminori Abe	1	311
15	"brother" Yasshi	2	255
16	Sugi	2	241
17	Fujita "Jr." Hayato	1	237
18	Shinjiro Otani	2	206
19	Van Vert Jack	1	218
19	Yuki Toki	1	218
21	Takafumi Ito	1	178
22	Tigers Mask/Atsushi Maruyama	2	173
23	Yasu Kubota	1	166
23	Hide Kubota	1	166
25	Masamune	1	159
26	Leonardo Spanky	2	148
27	Jimmy Kagetora	1	124
27	Jimmy Susumu	1	124
29	Seiki Yoshioka	1	114
29	Shuji Kondo	1	114
31	Tomohiro Ishii	1	107
32	Low Ki	1	106
33	Raicho	1	82
34	Koji Kanemoto	1	71
34	Minoru Tanaka	1	71
36	Isami Kodaka	2	57
36	Takumi Tsukamoto	2	57
38	Dick Togo	1	55
39	Kaz Hayashi	1	42
40	Ryota Nakatsu	1	35
40	Ryuichi Sekine	1	35
42	Mineo Fujita	1	22
43	Tsuyoshi Kikuchi	1	19
44	Naruki Doi †	1	4+

== See also ==
- List of National Wrestling Alliance championships
