= Takehiro Yamamura =

Japanese professional wrestler

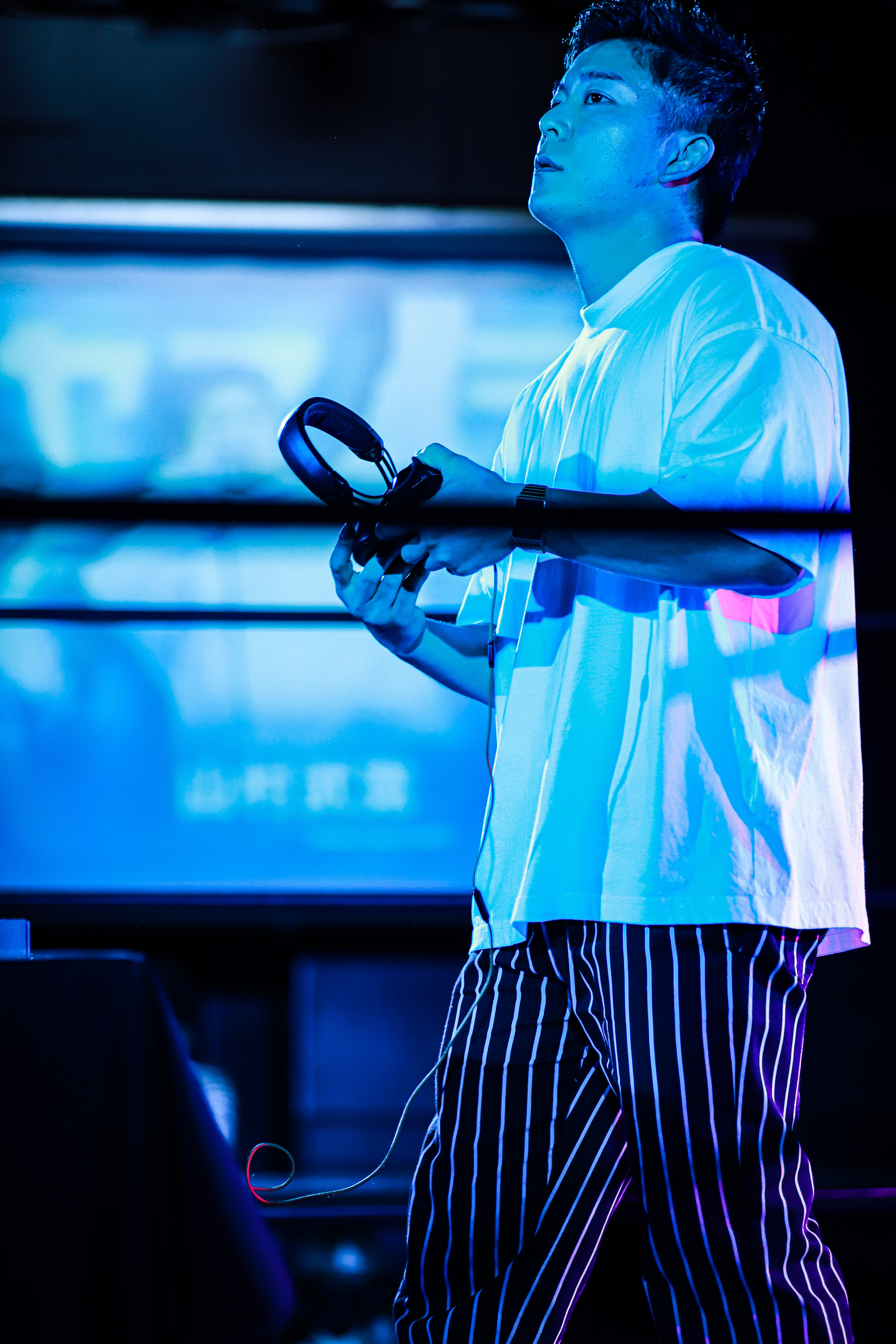
- Yamamura in May 2023

Personal information
- Born: 28 May 1995 (age 31) Osaka, Japan

Professional wrestling career
- Ring name: Takehiro Yamamura
- Billed height: 170 cm (5 ft 7 in)
- Billed weight: 75 kg (165 lb)
- Trained by: Cima
- Debut: 2015

Takehiro Yamamura (山村武寛, Yamamura Takehiro) is a Japanese professional wrestler, DJ and music producer. he is signed to Gleat where he is one half of the former one-time G-Infinity Champions. He is also known for his tenure with Dragongate and for his work in various other promotions from the Japanese independent scene.

== Professional wrestling career ==
=== Dragongate (2015–2018) ===
Yamamura made his professional wrestling debut in Dragongate on the fourteenth night of The Gate Of Passion 2015 from 2 May, where he wrestled Shachihoko Boy into a time-limit draw. During his time with the promotion, he was part of the "Over Generation" stable.

Yamamura chased for various accomplishments up for grabs in the promotion. On the sixth night of the Dragon Gate Brand New Gate event from 20 November 2016, he teamed up with stablemate Kaito Ishida to unsuccessfully challenge another pair of Over Generation stablemates Cima and Dragon Kid for the Open the Twin Gate Championship. At Dragon Gate Dead Or Alive 2017 on 5 May, he unsuccessfully challenged Jimmy Kagetora for the Open the Brave Gate Championship.

He competed in various of the promotion's signature events. In the Summer Adventure Tag League, Yamamyra made his first appearance at the 2015 edition in which he replaced an injured Cima early in the tournament as he teamed up with Gamma, placing themselves in the B block where they scored a total of two points after competing against Masato Yoshino and Akira Tozawa, Sumo Fujii and Ryo "Sumo" Saito, Shingo Takagi and Cyber Kong, and T-Hawk and Big R Shimizu. He made his last appearance at the 2016 edition where he teamed up with Kaito Ishida, placing themselves in the A block where they scored a total of two points after competing against Naruki Doi and "brother" Yasshi, Jimmy Susumu and Jimmy Kagetora, Masato Yoshino and T-Hawk, Genki Horiguchi and Ryo "Jimmy" Saito, and Yosuke ♡ Santa Maria and El Lindaman.

As for the King of Gate, Yamamura made his only appearance at the 2017 edition where he placed himself in the C block and scored a total of three points after competing against Naruki Doi, Cima, Jimmy Kagetora, Ryo "Jimmy" Saito and Takashi Yoshida.

In the Gate of Destiny series of events which portrait the greatest annual pay-per-views hosted by Dragongate, Yamamura made his first appearance at the 2015 edition where he teamed up with his Over Generation stablemate Punch Tominaga in a losing effort against VerserK (Cyber Kong and Mondai Ryu). One year later at the 2016 edition, he teamed up with Tominaga and other stablemate Kaito Ishida, this time falling short to Shun Watanabe, Hyo Watanabe and Futa Nakamura in six-man tag team competition.

=== Japanese independent circuit (2019–present) ===
Yamamura is also known for freelance work in various Japanese independent promotions. On the first night of the W-1 Tour 2019 Cherry Blossom, an event promoted by Wrestle-1 on 3 April 2019, Yamamura teamed up with #StrongHearts stablemate T-Hawk to unsuccessfully challenge Alejandro and Masayuki Kono for the Wrestle-1 Tag Team Championship.

=== Gleat (2023–present) ===
Yamamura made his debut in Gleat at G Prowrestling Ver.7 on 30 December 2023, where he fell short to Kaito Ishida in singles competition. During his time in the promotion, he was part of the "#StrongHearts" and "G-rize" stables.

Yamamura chased for various accomplishments in Gleat. At Gleat Ver. 11 ~ Kaz Hayashi Retirement Road In Fukuoka on 26 May 2024, he teamed up with Issei Onitsuka to unsuccessfully challenge Coelacanths (Cima and Kaz Hayashi) for the G-Infinity Championship. Yamamura and Onitsuka eventually succeeded in winning the tag titles at Gleat Ver. 17 on 1 June 2025, by defeating Tokyo Bad Boys (SBK and Takuma). This represented the first-ever title won by Yamamura in his career. At Gleat Ver. 16 on 22 February 2025, he unsuccessfully challenged Kaito Ishida for the G-Rex Championship.

Yamamura took part in the G-Rush Tournament, a competition created to crown the inaugural G-Rush Champion in which he defeated Kaito Ishida in the first rounds, then fell short to El Lindaman in the semifinals.

== Championships and accomplishments ==
- Gleat
  - G-Infinity Championship (1 time) – with Issei Onitsuka
