= Vent Vert Jack =

Japanese wrestler (born 2005)

- Vent Vert Jack in September 2025

Personal information
- Born: 3 August 2005 (age 21) Fukuoka, Japan
- Family: Vent Vert Negro (father); CoCo (sister)

Professional wrestling career
- Ring names: Jack "The Respect" Hayabusa; Jack The Tiger; Vent Vert Jack
- Billed height: 165 cm (5 ft 5 in)
- Billed weight: 63 kg (139 lb)
- Trained by: Jiraiya; Ranma
- Debut: 21 October 2012

Vent Vert Jack (ヴァンヴェール・ジャック, Vanvēru Jakku; born 3 August 2005) is a Japanese masked professional wrestler and promoter of the lucha libre promotion Myway, which he founded in 2020 with his father, Vent Vert Negro, who is also his trainer and the owner of Vent Vert Coffee, a café located is Sawara, Fukuoka. He is also known for his time with Real Lucha Libre, Pro Wrestling Freedoms, DDT Pro-Wrestling, Pro Wrestling Zero1 and Gleat.

== Professional wrestling career ==
=== Japanese independent circuit (2012–present) ===
As a developmental talent, Jack competes in various promotions of the Japanese independent circuit. At DDT's Super Star Lanes 2015, an event promoted by DDT Pro-Wrestling on 13 December 2015, he competed in a battle royal, bout disputed for the Ironman Heavymetalweight Championship which also featured Saki Akai, Maki Itoh, Yasu Urano and several other opponents. The title changed hands multiple times during the bout, also entering into Jack's possession for several moments, making him one of the youngest documented champions in professional wrestling. At Never Mind 2021, Jack defeated Ilusion in singles competition as part of the "DDTeeeen!" specialized youth-focused project.

In Osaka Pro Wrestling's Tennōzan Tournament, Jack made his first appearance at the 2026 edition where he defeated Goliath in the first rounds, then fell short to Toru Matsunaga in the second. At Tenryu Project's Reborn for the Future Vol. 3 on 29 July 2026, Jack unsuccessfully challenged Keita Yano for the Tenryu Project International Junior Heavyweight Championship.

==== Real Lucha Libre (2012–2020) ====
Jack started practicing professional wrestling in 2011 when he was in the first grade, under the guidance of Real Lucha Libre promotion coaches Jiraiya and Ranma. He made his official debut on 21 October 2012 aged 7, at Tradition of the Soul, where he defeated Yousei Estrella in singles competition, making him one of the youngest documented professional wrestlers to step foot in the ring. He spent a total of eight years with the promotion before departing to the independent scene.

==== Pro Wrestling Zero1 (2025–present) ====
At the Pro-Wrestling Zero1 25th Anniversary, on 3 April 2026, Jack teamed up with Yuki Toki and defeated Bryan Ishizaka and Takuya Sugawara to win the vacant International Lightweight Tag Team Championship.

Jack competed in various signature events of the promotion. In the Furinkazan Tournament, Jack teamed up with Masato Tanaka and fell short to Jinsei Shinzaki and Hayabusa in the second rounds. He made his first appearance in the Tenkaichi Junior Tournament at the 2026 edition which he won after defeating Kosuke Sato in the quarterfinals, Yuki Toki in the semifinals, and Naruki Doi in the finals.

==== Gleat (2026–present) ====
Jack made his debut in Gleat at Gleat Ver. 22 on 10 January 2026, where he unsuccessfully challenged Minoru Tanaka for the G-Rush Championship. At Gleat Ver. 26 on 16 July 2026, he teamed up with Kapy to unsuccessfully challenge Black Generation International (Kaito Ishida and Kazma Sakamoto) for the G-Infinity Championship.

== Championships and accomplishments ==
- DDT Pro-Wrestling
  - Ironman Heavymetalweight Championship (1 time)
- Gleat
  - G-Rush Championship (1 time, current)
- Lucha Mexicana Por Orientales
  - LMO Trios Championship (1 time) – with Dragon Yuki and Vent Vert Negro
- Pro Wrestling Zero1
  - International Lightweight Tag Team Championship (1 time) – with Yuki Toki
  - Tenkaichi Junior (2026)
- Ryukyu Dragon Pro Wrestling
  - Sou Ryuo Tag Team Championship (1 time) – with Hibiscus Mii
