= Issei Onitsuka =

Japanese professional wrestler

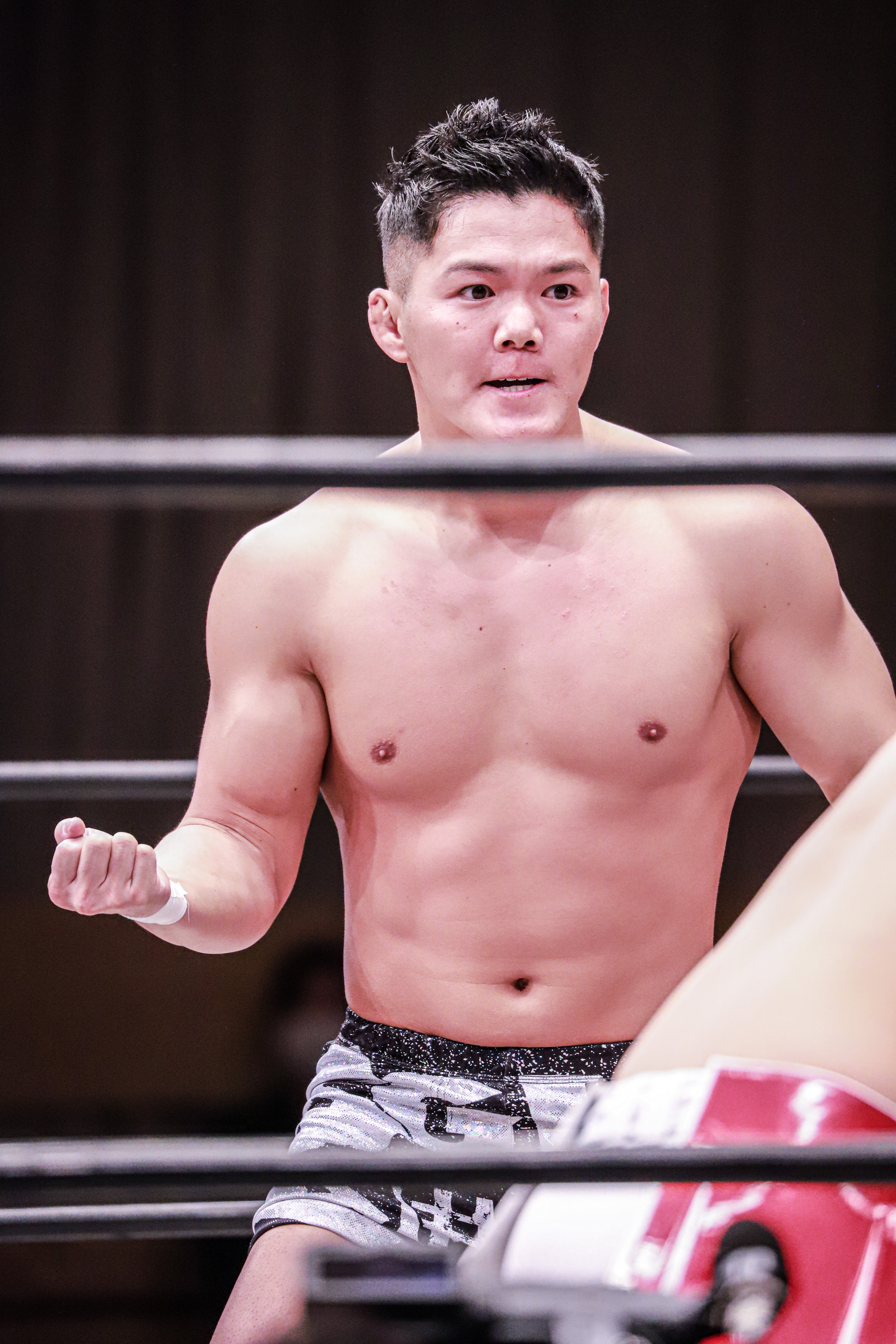
- Onitsuka in February 2022

Personal information
- Born: 26 December 1995 (age 30) Osaka, Japan

Professional wrestling career
- Ring name: Issei Onitsuka
- Billed height: 176 cm (5 ft 9 in)
- Billed weight: 82 kg (181 lb)
- Trained by: Animal Hamaguchi; Cima
- Debut: 2019
- Retired: 2025

Issei Onitsuka (鬼塚一聖, Onizuka Issei) is a Japanese retired professional wrestler. He is best known or his time with Gleat where he is a former G-Rush Champion and G-Infinity Champion. He is also known for his stint tenures with Wrestle-1 and All Japan Pro Wrestling (AJPW).

== Professional wrestling career ==
=== Wrestle-1 (2019–2020) ===
Onitsuka has had a short tenure with Wrestle-1, promotion in which he made his debut on the fourth night of the W-1 WRESTLE-1 Tour 2019 Triumph from May 13, where he teamed up with #StrongHearts stablemate T-Hawk to defeat El Hijo del Pantera and Koji Doi in tag team competition.

On April 1, 2020, at W-1 WRESTLE-1 Tour 2020 Trans Magic, Wrestle-1 has held its last event before closure where Onitsuka competed twice. First by teaming up with Seiki Yoshioka and Cima in a winning effort against Andy Wu, El Hijo del Pantera and Jun Tonsho, and secondly, in a battle royal won by Manabu Soya and featuring various other members of the roster such as Hiroshi Yamato, Jiro Kuroshio, Ryota Hama, Yasufumi Nakanoue, Masayuki Kono and many others.

=== All Japan Pro-Wrestling (2021–2023) ===
Onitsuka made sporadic appearances for All Japan Pro Wrestling. On the fifth night of the AJPW Summer Action Series 2021 from July 22, he teamed up with El Lindaman to unsuccessfully challenge Purple Haze (Zeus and Izanagi) for the All Asia Tag Team Championship.

=== Gleat (2021–2025) ===
Onitsuka made his debut in Gleat at Gleat Fan Meeting in Sapporo on May 5, 2021, where he fell short to Masato Tanaka in singles competition.

During his time with the promotion, Onitsuka chased for various accomplishments. He took part in the inaugural G-Rex Championship tournament in which he fell short to El Lindaman in the first rounds on January 26, 2022. Even before his time in Gleat, Onitsuka was part of the #StrongHearts since 2018. At Gleat Ver.4 on December 30, 2022, he teamed up with stablemate Shigehiro Irie to unsuccessfully challenge reigning champions Bulk Orchestra (Check Shimatani and Hayato Tamura) in a three-way tag team match for the G-Infinity Championship which also involved the team of Black Generation (Flamita and Yutani). Onitsuka made it to the finals of the 2025 G-Rush Tournament from January 24 in which he fell short to El Lindaman. Three months later at Gleat Vol. 88 on April 29, 2025, Onitsuka succeeded in defeating Lindaman to capture the G-Rush Championship which represented the first title of his career.

Onitsuka retired from professional wrestling on July 9, 2025, after confirmed allegiations regarding to the violation of his contract with Gleat.

== Championships and accomplishments ==
- All Japan Pro Wrestling
  - Six-Man Tag Team Tournament (2022) – with Shigehiro Irie and T-Hawk
- Gleat
  - G-Rush Championship (1 time)
  - G-Infinity Championship (1 time) – with Takehiro Yamamura
