= G-Rush Championship =

- Current design of the title (2025–present)

Details
- Promotion: Gleat
- Date established: January 2025
- Current champion: Van Vert Jack
- Date won: October 16, 2026
Statistics
- First champion: El Lindaman
- Most reigns: All titleholders (1 reign)
- Longest reign: Minoru Tanaka (210 days)
- Shortest reign: El Lindaman (56 days)
- Oldest champion: Minoru Tanaka (53 years and 5 days)
- Youngest champion: Van Vert Jack (21 years, 2 months and 13 days)
- Heaviest champion: Issei Onitsuka (180 lbs)
- Lightest champion: Van Vert Jack (139 lbs)

The G-Rush Championship (Japanese: Gラッシュ王座, Hepburn: G Rasshu Ōza) is a professional wrestling championship created and promoted by the Japanese company Lidet Entertainment and is currently disputed in the Gleat promotion.

== Inaugural tournament ==
The inaugural tournament for the title took place mainly under a round-robin tournament on January 24, 2025, won by El Lindaman who furtherly faced Lio Rush in the official inaugural championship match.

Quarterfinals
El Lindaman	Pin
Brass Knuckles Jun	0:03
Kaito Ishida	1:31
Takehiro Yamamura	Pin
Nobu San	Pin
Seiki Yoshioka	5:22
Tetsuya Izuchi	4:02
Issei Onitsuka	Pin

Semifinals
El Lindaman	Pin
Takehiro Yamamura	2:31
Nobu San	6:19
Issei Onitsuka	Pin

Finals
El Lindaman	Pin
Issei Onitsuka	6:40

== Reigns ==
As of November 14, 2026. There have been a total of five reigns shared between five different champions. The current champion is Van Vert Jack who is in his first reign.

Key
No.	Overall reign number
Reign	Reign number for the specific champion
Days	Number of days held
Defenses	Number of successful defenses
+	Current reign is changing daily

No.	Champion	Championship change			Reign statistics			Notes	Ref.
No.	Champion	Date	Event	Location	Reign	Days	Defenses	Notes	Ref.
1	El Lindaman	February 22, 2025	Gleat Ver. 16	Tokyo, Japan	1	56	1	Defeated Lio Rush in a tournament final to become the inaugural champion.	
2	Issei Onitsuka	April 19, 2025	Gleat Ver. 88	Osaka, Japan	1	81	2		
—	Vacated	July 9, 2025	—	—	—	—	—	Title vacated after Issei Onitsuka retired from professional wrestling.	
3	Minoru Tanaka	December 4, 2025	Gleat Ver. 99	Tokyo, Japan	1	210	6	Defeated Brass Knuckles Jun and Kaito Ishida in a three-way match to win the vacant title.	
4	Soma Watanabe	July 2, 2026	Gleat The Beginning Of The 6th Year	Tokyo, Japan	1	106	3	This was a three-way match also involving Brass Knuckles Jun.	
5	Van Vert Jack	October 16, 2026	Gleat G Group Members Only Event	Tokyo, Japan	1	29+	1		

== Combined reigns ==
As of November 14, 2026.

†	Indicates the current champion

Rank	Wrestler	No. of reigns	Combined defenses	Combined days
1	Minoru Tanaka	1	6	210
2	Soma Watanabe	1	3	106
3	Issei Onitsuka	1	2	81
4	El Lindaman	1	1	56
5	Van Vert Jack †	1	1	29+
