= Intercontinental Tag Team Championship (Zero1) =

Professional wrestling tag team championship

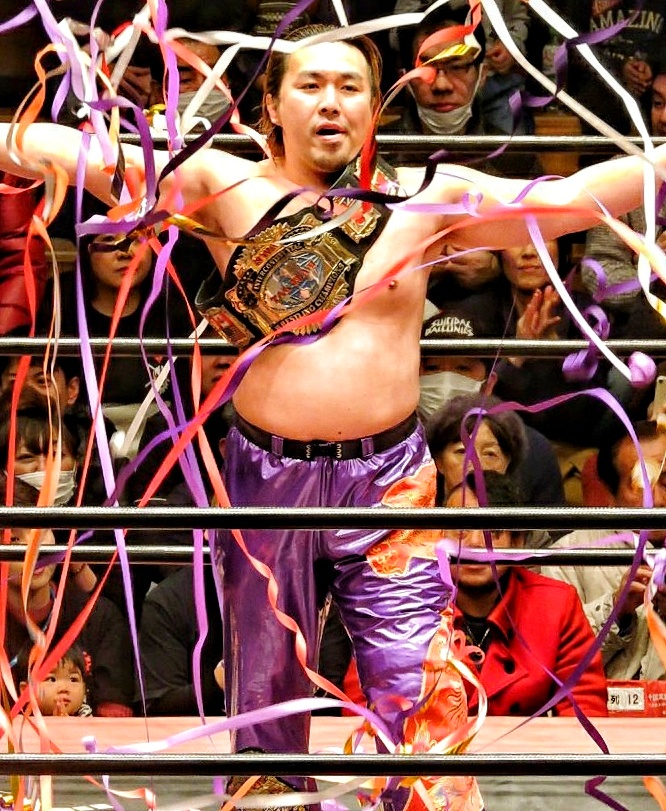
- Takuya Sugawara with the current belt design in 2020

Details
- Promotion: Pro Wrestling Zero1; NWA
- Date established: June 14, 2001
- Current champions: Junya Matsunaga and Tsugutaka Sato
- Date won: December 27, 2025

Other name
- NWA Intercontinental Tag Team Championship
Statistics
- First champions: Samoa Joe and Keiji Sakoda
- Longest reign: Kengo Mashimo and Naka Shuma (556 days)
- Shortest reign: Steve Corino and Mike Rapada; Shinya Hashimoto and Naoya Ogawa (3 days)
- Oldest champion: Taru (54 years, 31 days)

The Intercontinental Tag Team Championship, also known as the NWA Intercontinental Tag Team Championship, is a professional wrestling tag team championship in Japanese promotion Pro Wrestling Zero1, typically reserved for (but not exclusive to) heavyweight (>100 kg (220 lb)) wrestlers. It was created on June 14, 2001, three months after then Pro Wrestling Zero-One's creation, when Samoa Joe and Keiji Sakoda (though Zero1 has since ceased to recognize both their reign as well as the following reign by Steve Corino and Mike Rapada) defeated Yuki Ishikawa and Katsumi Usuda. The championship was created when Zero-One was a member of the National Wrestling Alliance (NWA); since Zero-One departed from the NWA in late 2004, the NWA does not recognize or sanction it, though it retains the NWA initials. It is one of two tag team titles currently active in Zero1, along with the Blast King Tag Team Championship, a specialty title defended exclusively in explosion matches.

There have been a total of 58 recognized individual champions and 47 recognized teams, who have had a combined 52 official reigns. The current champions are Kubota Brothers (Yasu Kubota and Hide Kubota) who are in their second reign as a team as well as individually.

== Title history ==
Key
No.	Overall reign number
Reign	Reign number for the specific team—reign numbers for the individuals are in parentheses, if different
Days	Number of days held
Defenses	Number of successful defenses
<1	Reign lasted less than a day
+	Current reign is changing daily

No.	Champion	Championship change			Reign statistics			Notes	Ref.
No.	Champion	Date	Event	Location	Reign	Days	Defenses	Notes	Ref.
(NWA) National Wrestling Alliance / Pro Wrestling Zero1 (Zero1)
1	Samoa Joe and Keiji Sakoda	June 14, 2001	Shingeki	Osaka, Japan	1	25	0	Defeated Yuki Ishikawa and Katsumi Usuda to become the inaugural champions.	
2	Steve Corino and Mike Rapada	July 9, 2001	—	—	1	3	0	Awarded the title by NWA president Howard Brody.	
3	Shinjiro Otani and Yuki Ishikawa	July 12, 2001	True Century Battle Tour	Tokyo, Japan	1	(Note: The exact date on which Otani and Ishikawa were stripped of the championship is not known, which means that their reign lasted between 81 and 111 days.)	0		
—	Vacated	October 2001	—	—	—	—	—	Vacated due to Ishikawa leaving ZERO-ONE.	
4	Emblem (Shinjiro Otani (2) and Masato Tanaka)	January 6, 2002	Vast Energy	Tokyo, Japan	1	287	5	Defeated Samoa Joe and Tom Howard.	
5	Nathan Jones and Jon Heidenreich	October 20, 2002	Improvement II Tour	Tokyo, Japan	1	6	1		
6	OH-gun (Shinya Hashimoto and Naoya Ogawa)	October 26, 2002	Improvement II Tour	Osaka, Japan	1	50	1		
7	Matt Ghaffari and Tom Howard	December 15, 2002	Truth Creation	Tokyo, Japan	1	135	2		
8	OH-gun (Shinya Hashimoto and Naoya Ogawa)	April 29, 2003	01 Division Tour	Nagoya, Japan	2	3	0		
—	Vacated	May 3, 2003	—	—	—	—	—	Stripped by NWA Chairman Richard Arpin due to Ogawa throwing Ghaffari over the top rope in winning the title.	
9	Steve Corino (2) and C. W. Anderson	May 3, 2003	01WORLD	Tokyo, Japan	1	120	3	Defeated Kohei Sato and Hirotaka Yokoi.	
10	Emblem (Shinjiro Otani (3) and Masato Tanaka)	August 31, 2003	01 Summer Gift	Gifu, Japan	2	172	2		
11	Takao Omori and Shiro Koshinaka	February 19, 2004	Embers Tour	Tokyo, Japan	1	119	5		
12	Shinya Hashimoto (3) and Yoshiaki Fujiwara	June 17, 2004	Ambitious	Sendai, Japan	1	75	2		
Pro Wrestling Zero1 (Zero1)
13	Shinjiro Otani (4) and Takao Omori (2)	August 31, 2004	Determination II	Morioka, Japan	1	33	1		
14	Masato Tanaka (3) and Wataru Sakata	October 3, 2004	New Whirlpool-1 Truth II Tour	Tokyo, Japan	1	28	0		
—	Vacated	October 31, 2004	—	—	—	—	—	Vacated due to ZERO-ONE leaving the NWA.	
15	Kohei Sato and Ryoji Sai	April 14, 2005	Outburst Revolution Tour	Tokyo, Japan	1	179	3	Defeated Shinjiro Otani and Masato Tanaka.	
16	Aibo Tag (Ikuto Hidaka and Minoru Fujita)	October 10, 2005	Interception Tour	Tokyo, Japan	1	138	1		
17	Steve Corino (3) and Y2P-160kg	February 25, 2006	Happening Tour	Osaka, Japan	1	115	1		
18	Kohei Sato and Ryoji Sai	June 20, 2006	Rights Tour	Odawara, Japan	2	4	0		
19	Wild Child (Manabu Nakanishi and Takao Omori (3))	June 24, 2006	Rights Tour	Tokyo, Japan	1	257	2		
20	Yoshihiro Takayama and Kohei Sato (3)	March 8, 2007	Max Satisfaction Tour	Tokyo, Japan	1	232	2		
21	Stepbrother Tag (Minoru Fujita (2) and Takuya Sugawara)	October 26, 2007	Innovation Tour	Tokyo, Japan	1	399	4		
22	Mr. Wrestling 3 (4) and Charles Evans	November 28, 2008	Zero1 Beat Tour	Tokyo, Japan	1	94	0		
—	Vacated	March 2, 2009	—	—	—	—	—	Vacated due to Charles Evans' rebellious actions against World Premier Federation.	
23	Ryoji Sai (3) and Osamu Namiguchi	March 15, 2009	Wrestler's 1	Tokyo, Japan	1	123	1	Defeated Steve Corino and Mr. Wrestling 3.	
24	Kohei Sato (4) and Kamikaze	July 16, 2009	Wrestler's	Utsunomiya, Japan	1	100	2		
25	Ikuto Hidaka (2) and Munenori Sawa	October 24, 2009	Wrestler's 6 ~ Never Gonna Stop!	Tokyo, Japan	1	95	0		
26	Shinjiro Otani (5) and Akebono	January 27, 2010	Wrestler's 9	Tokyo, Japan	1	315	4		
—	Vacated	December 8, 2010	—	—	—	—	—	Vacated so that the title could be decided in the Furinkazan tournament.	
27	Kohei Sato (5) and Kamikaze	December 21, 2010	Furinkazan	Nagoya, Japan	2	267	3	Defeated Masato Tanaka and Daisuke Sekimoto in the final of the Furinkazan tournament.	
(NWA) National Wrestling Alliance / Pro Wrestling Zero1 (Zero1)
28	Masato Tanaka (4) and Zeus	September 14, 2011	Tenkaichi Junior	Tokyo, Japan	1	419	4		
29	Shito Ueda and Yusaku Obata	November 6, 2012	Universe	Tokyo, Japan	1	73	0		
Pro Wrestling Zero1 (Zero1)
—	Vacated	January 18, 2013	—	—	—	—	—	Vacated due to Obata being sidelined with an injury.	
30	ZERO64 (Akebono (2) and Daisuke Sekimoto)	February 3, 2013	Change the World	Tokyo, Japan	1	330	1	Defeated Kohei Sato and Zeus.	
—	Vacated	December 30, 2013	—	—	—	—	—	Vacated due to Sekimoto being sidelined with an injury.	
31	Shinjiro Otani (6) and Kamikaze (3)	January 1, 2014	N/A	Tokyo, Japan	1	125	1	Defeated Masato Tanaka and Yusaku Obata to win the vacant titles.	
32	Dangan Yankees (Masato Tanaka (5) and Takashi Sugiura)	May 6, 2014	Destiny	Tokyo, Japan	1	397	6		
33	Kohei Sato (6) and Daisuke Sekimoto (2)	June 7, 2015	Long, Long Way	Tokyo, Japan	1	334	4		
34	Masato Tanaka (6) and James Raideen	May 6, 2016	Children's Day Special	Tokyo, Japan	1	253	2		
35	Voodoo Murders (Hartley Jackson and Taru)	January 14, 2017	New Year Dream Series	Tokyo, Japan	1	20	0		
36	Akebono (3) and Shogun Okamoto	February 3, 2017	New Year Dream Series	Tokyo, Japan	1	75	1		
—	Vacated	April 19, 2017	—	—	—	—	—	Vacated due to Akebono being sidelined with health issues.	
37	Kai and Yusaku Obata (2)	May 21, 2017	Shinsei Zero1 Dream Series ~ Growth	Tokyo, Japan	1	101	0	Defeated Kohei Sato and Hideki Suzuki.	
—	Vacated	August 30, 2017	—	—	—	—	—	Vacated due to Kai and Obata being unable to defend the title because of scheduling conflicts.	
38	Hideki Suzuki and Kohei Sato (7)	September 14, 2017	Zero1 Dream Series	Tokyo, Japan	1	109	1	Defeated Shogun Okamoto and Yutaka Yoshie.	
39	Masayuki Okamoto/Shogun Okamoto (2) and Yutaka Yoshie (2)	January 1, 2018	Kinga Shinnen	Tokyo, Japan	1	62	0	Okamoto won the title as Masayuki Okamoto, but immediately afterwards announced he was returning to the ring name Shogun Okamoto.	
40	Voodoo Murders (Masato Tanaka (7) and Yuji Hino)	March 4, 2018	Kinga Shinnen	Tokyo, Japan	1	203	3		
41	Voodoo Murders (Taru (2) and Chris Vice)	September 23, 2018	Chibiko Bullying Eradication Genki Hatsuratsu ~ A Really Strong Person Does Not Do Bullying But Will Stand Up	Iwate, Japan	1	100	0		
42	Masato Tanaka (8) and Takuya Sugawara (2)	January 1, 2019	Happy New Year	Tokyo, Japan	1	298	3		
43	Yuko Miyamoto and Masashi Takeda	October 26, 2019	Yasukuni Shine 150th Anniversary Hono Pro Wrestling 17th Yamato Shinshu Chikara Matsuri	Tokyo, Japan	1	280	2		
—	Vacated	August 1, 2020	—	—	—	—	—	Vacated due to Takeda suffering an injury.	
44	Towa Iwasaki and Tsugutaka Sato	August 2, 2020	We're Not Going To Lose To Corona!	Tokyo, Japan	1	93	1	Defeated Yuko Miyamoto and Takashi Sasaki to win the vacant championships.	
45	Quiet Storm and Yuji Hino (2)	November 3, 2020	ZERO1 Hono Pro-Wrestling 18th Yamato Shinshu Chikara Matsuri	Tokyo, Japan	1	16	0		
—	Vacated	November 19, 2020	—	—	—	—	—	Vacated due to Hino leaving Zero1.	
46	Shinjiro Otani (7) and Yumehito Imanari	December 25, 2020	ZERO1 2020 Final Show ~ Christmas Night	Tokyo, Japan	1	268	1	Defeated the Kubota Brothers (Hide Kubota and Yasu Kubota) in the 2020 Furinkazan Tag Tournament final which was also for the vacant titles.	
—	Vacated	September 19, 2021	—	—	—	—	—		
47	Gajo and Tomohiko Hashimoto	November 22, 2021	Furiknazan 2021	Tokyo, Japan	1	114	1	Defeated Hartley Jackson and Junya Matsunaga in the 2021 Furinkazan Tag Tournament final which was also for the vacant titles.	
48	Junya Matsunaga and Takafumi	March 6, 2022	Shinjiro Otani Debut 30th Anniversary Year & ZERO1 Launch 21st Anniversary Show	Tokyo, Japan	1	301	2		
49	Kubota Brothers (Hide Kubota and Yasu Kubota)	January 1, 2023	Zero1 Happy New Year 2023	Tokyo, Japan	1	365	6		
50	Junya Matsunaga (2) and Tsugutaka Sato (2)	January 1, 2024	Zero1 Happy New Year 2023	Tokyo, Japan	1	79	3		
51	M2J (Kengo Mashimo and Naka Shuma)	March 20, 2024	2AW Grand Slam In Korakuen Hall	Tokyo, Japan	1	556	3	This was a winner-takes-all match in which Mashimo and Shuma's 2AW Tag Team Championship were also on the line.	
52	Kubota Brothers (Hide Kubota and Yasu Kubota)	September 27, 2025	Zero1	Tokyo, Japan	2	21	0		
—	Vacated	October 18, 2025	—	—	—	—	—		
53	Junya Matsunaga (3) and Tsugutaka Sato (3)	December 27, 2025	2025 Furinkazan Tournament	Tokyo, Japan	2	183+	2	Defeated Hayabusa and Jinsei Shinzaki in the finals of the 2025 Furinkazan Tournament which were also disputed for the titles.	

== Combined reigns ==
As of June 28, 2026.

†	Indicates the current champion
¤	The exact length of at least one title reign is uncertain, so the shortest length is considered.

=== By team ===
Rank	Team	No. of reigns	Combined defenses	Combined days
1	M2J (Kengo Mashimo and Naka Shuma)	1	3	556
2	Emblem (Shinjiro Otani and Masato Tanaka)	2	7	459
3	Masato Tanaka and Zeus	1	4	419
4	Stepbrother Tag (Minoru Fujita and Takuya Sugawara)	1	4	399
5	Dangan Yankees (Masato Tanaka and Takashi Sugiura)	1	6	397
6	Kubota Brothers (Hide Kubota and Yasu Kubota)	2	6	386
7	Kohei Sato and Kamikaze	2	5	367
8	Kohei Sato and Daisuke Sekimoto	1	4	334
9	ZERO64 (Akebono and Daisuke Sekimoto)	1	1	330
10	Shinjiro Otani and Akebono	1	4	315
11	Junya Matsunaga and Takafumi	1	2	301
12	Masato Tanaka and Takuya Sugawara	1	3	298
13	Yuko Miyamoto and Masashi Takeda	1	2	280
14	Shinjiro Otani and Yumehito Imanari	1	1	268
15	Wild Child (Manabu Nakanishi and Takao Omori)	1	2	257
16	Masato Tanaka and James Raideen	1	2	253
17	Yoshihiro Takayama and Kohei Sato	1	2	232
18	Junya Matsunaga and Tsugutaka Sato †	2	5	262+
19	Voodoo Murders (Masato Tanaka and Yuji Hino)	1	3	203
20	Kohei Sato and Ryoji Sai	2	3	183
21	Aibo Tag (Ikuto Hidaka and Minoru Fujita)	1	1	138
22	Matt Ghaffari and Tom Howard	1	2	135
23	Shinjiro Otani and Kamikaze	1	1	125
24	Ryoji Sai and Osamu Namiguchi	1	1	123
25	Steve Corino and C. W. Anderson	1	3	120
26	Takao Omori and Shiro Koshinaka	1	5	119
27	Steve Corino and Y2P-160kg	1	1	115
28	Gajo and Tomohiko Hashimoto	1	1	114
29	Hideki Suzuki and Kohei Sato	1	1	109
30	Kai and Yusaku Obata	1	0	101
31	Voodoo Murders (Taru and Chris Vice)	1	0	100
32	Ikuto Hidaka and Munenori Sawa	1	0	95
33	Mr. Wrestling 3 and Charles Evans	1	0	94
34	Towa Iwasaki and Tsugutaka Sato	1	1	93
35	Shinjiro Otani and Yuki Ishikawa	1	0	¤81
36	Shinya Hashimoto and Yoshiaki Fujiwara	1	2	75
36	Akebono and Shogun Okamoto	1	1	75
38	Shito Ueda and Yusaku Obata	1	0	73
39	Masayuki Okamoto/Shogun Okamoto and Yutaka Yoshie	1	0	62
40	OH-gun (Shinya Hashimoto and Naoya Ogawa)	2	1	53
41	Shinjiro Otani and Takao Omori	1	1	33
42	Masato Tanaka and Wataru Sakata	1	0	28
43	Samoa Joe and Keiji Sakoda	1	0	25
44	Voodoo Murders (Hartley Jackson and Taru)	1	0	20
45	Quiet Storm and Yuji Hino	1	0	16
46	Nathan Jones and Jon Heidenreich	1	1	6
47	Steve Corino and Mike Rapada	1	0	3

=== By wrestler ===
Rank	Team	No. of reigns	Combined defenses	Combined days
1	Masato Tanaka	8	23	2,057
2	Shinjiro Otani	7	14	¤1,281
3	Kohei Sato	7	15	1,225
4	Akebono	3	6	720
5	Takuya Sugawara	2	7	697
6	Daisuke Sekimoto	2	5	665
7	Kengo Mashimo	1	3	556
7	Naka Shuma	1	3	556
9	Minoru Fujita	2	5	537
10	Junya Matsunaga †	3	7	563+
11	Kamikaze	3	6	492
12	Zeus	1	4	419
13	Takao Omori	3	8	409
14	Takashi Sugiura	1	6	397
15	Hide Kubota	2	6	386
15	Yasu Kubota	2	6	386
17	Steve Corino	4	4	334
18	Ryouji Sai	3	4	306
19	Tsugutaka Sato †	3	6	355+
20	Takafumi	1	2	301
21	Masashi Takeda	1	2	280
21	Yuko Miyamoto	1	2	280
23	Yumehito Imanari	1	1	268
24	Manabu Nakanishi	1	2	257
25	James Raideen	1	2	253
26	Ikuto Hidaka	2	1	233
27	Yoshihiro Takayama	1	2	232
28	Yuji Hino	2	3	219
29	Y2P-160 kg/Yutaka Yoshie	2	1	187
30	Yusaku Obata	2	0	174
31	Shogun Okamoto/Masayuki Okamoto	2	1	137
32	Matt Ghaffari	1	2	135
33	Tom Howard	1	2	135
34	Shinya Hashimoto	3	3	128
35	Osamu Namiguchi	1	1	123
36	Taru	2	0	120
36	C. W. Anderson	1	3	120
38	Shiro Koshinaka	1	5	119
39	Gajo	1	1	114
39	Tomohiko Hashimoto	1	1	114
41	Hideki Suzuki	1	1	109
42	Kai	1	0	101
43	Chris Vice	1	0	100
44	Munenori Sawa	1	0	95
45	Charles Evans	1	0	94
46	Towa Iwasaki	1	1	93
47	Yuki Ishikawa	1	0	¤81
48	Yoshiaki Fujiwara	1	2	75
49	Shito Ueda	1	0	73
50	Naoya Ogawa	2	1	53
51	Wataru Sakata	1	0	28
51	Samoa Joe	1	0	28
53	Keiji Sakoda	1	0	25
54	Hartley Jackson	1	0	20
55	Quiet Storm	1	0	16
56	John Heidenreich	1	1	6
56	Nathan Jones	1	1	6
58	Mike Rapada	1	0	3

== See also ==
- List of National Wrestling Alliance championships
