= Ikuto Hidaka =

Japanese professional wrestler

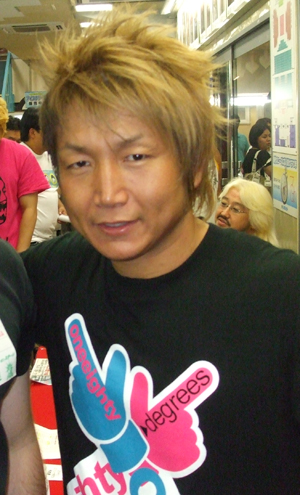

Personal information
- Born: August 5, 1972 (age 53) Masuda, Shimane, Japan

Professional wrestling career
- Ring name: Ikuto Hidaka
- Billed height: 1.70 m (5 ft 7 in)
- Billed weight: 85 kg (187 lb)
- Trained by: Animal Hamaguchi; Shoichi Funaki
- Debut: January 21, 1997

Ikuto Hidaka (日高郁人, Hidaka Ikuto) (born August 5, 1972) is a Japanese professional wrestler, currently performing for Pro Wrestling Noah (Noah). Hidaka was the regular partner of Minoru Fujita, with whom he has held the Zero1-Max International Lightweight Tag Team and Intercontinental Tag Team Titles, making them the only team to do so. He has also worked for Extreme Championship Wrestling (ECW).

== Professional wrestling career ==
=== Battlarts (1997–2001) ===
Hidaka debuted for the Battlarts shoot style promotion in 1997 after training in the Animal Hamaguchi Dojo. He spent his rookie year venturing to promotions like Michinoku Pro Wrestling (Michinoku Pro) and Kingdom Pro Wrestling (KPW), sharing rings with names like Yuki Ishikawa, Daisuke Ikeda, Minoru Tanaka and Yoshihiro Tajiri. In 1998, he challenged for the vacated UWA World Middleweight Championship, but was defeated by Willow. Shortly after, he formed a tag team with Minoru Fujita, who was based in Big Japan Pro Wrestling (BJW), and they competed at the Tag League 98, where they managed to snatch a significant win over Masao Orihara and Takeshi Ono. They would team extensively in several promotions, but over time, conflicting schedules from competing for separate promotions limited their activity as a team.

In November 1999, after several months wrestling for Battlarts alone, Hidaka was sent to America as a Battlarts representative for a learning excursion in Extreme Championship Wrestling (ECW). He competed mainly in cruiserweight matches against Yoshihiro Tajiri and Super Crazy, as well as Super Calo. His tenure was notable for commentator Joel Gertner constantly making racist remarks about Hidaka during his matches and nicknamed him "Pokémon" after the popular children's animated series. In 2000, Hidaka returned to Japan, now somewhat higher on the scale, and wrestled numerous matches for Battlarts with Mitsuya Nagai as his tag team partner. He wrestled for the promotion until its very end in late 2001.

=== Michinoku Pro Wrestling (2001) ===
After Battlarts collapsed, Hidaka wandered in the Japanese independent circuit. He entered Michinoku Pro Wrestling (Michinoku Pro) and won a tournament for the vacant FMW Independent World Junior Heavyweight Championship, upsetting New Japan Pro-Wrestling star El Samurai in the final - his first great solo victory. He made an alliance with Dick Togo, styling himself as Togo's disciple and joining him in the Far East Connection stable. As Togo and Michinoku Pro owner The Great Sasuke bickered over problems that had once caused Togo to leave the promotion before, the team left the promotion for Pro Wrestling Zero-One (Zero-One).

=== Pro Wrestling Zero-One/Zero1 (2001–2020) ===
In 2001, Hidaka entered Pro Wrestling Zero1 (Zero1) and began to battle the active junior heavyweight roster. For a while they were successful, winning the NWA International Lightweight Tag Team title once, but as Togo wanted to keep on wrestling other independents, their team broke up just in time as Minoru Fujita was returning from an overseas excursion. Hidaka and Fujita formed a team known as Skull and Bones and became prominent in the ZERO-1MAX/independent scene, even winning Pro Wrestling Noah (Noah)'s GHC Junior Heavyweight Tag Team Championship. Following a crucial loss to Minoru Tanaka and Masaaki Mochizuki, another team long "defunct before it even started" due to scheduling conflicts, Hidaka and Fujita turned on each other. On January 19, Hidaka beat Fujita to win the AWA World Junior Heavyweight title for a second time. He lost the title to Mochizuki on January 23, 2008.

In 2002, Hidaka had his mixed martial arts debut for Deep as a Zero1 representative, pitted against his close friend Takafumi Ito. Although he lacked formal MMA training, he had some experience in shoot wrestling thanks to his time in Battlarts and routinely trained kickboxing under Satoshi Kobayashi and Naoyuki Taira, who cornered him for the fight. The slightly heavier and much more experienced Ito dominated the grappling exchanges, but Hidaka survived until the second round and held his own with some ankle lock attempts before losing by rear naked choke.

=== Other promotions ===
Hidaka once appeared with Togo and Christopher Daniels in a Major League Wrestling (MLW) match in the United States in 2002, one of his rare appearances abroad.

On March 13, 2010, Hidaka made his debut for American professional wrestling promotion Evolve Wrestling at Evolve 2: Hero vs. Hidaka, defeating Chris Hero in the main event of the evening.

== Personal life ==
Hidaka owns and works at a fitness center called FLENJI. The gym is located in the Suginami ward of Tokyo and employs fellow pro-wrestlers Munenori Sawa, Fuminori Abe and Towa Iwasaki.

== Championships and accomplishments ==
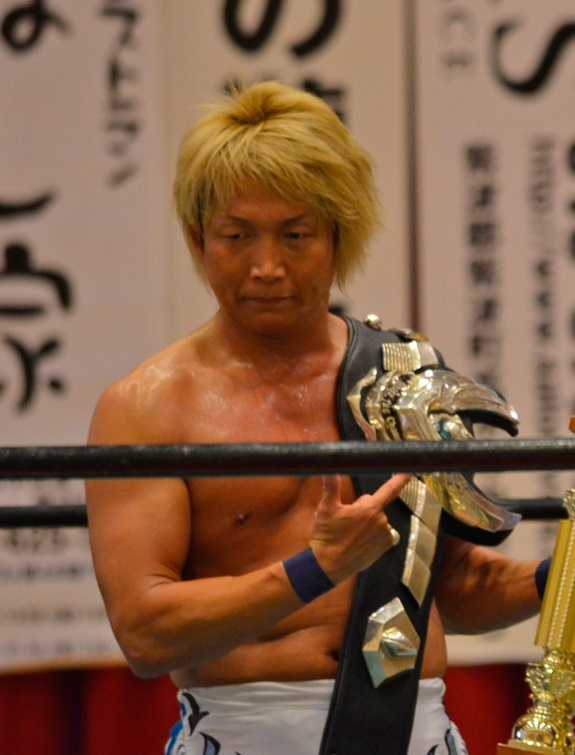
Hidaka with one of the Tohoku Tag Team Championship belts

- Big Japan Pro Wrestling
  - BJW Junior Heavyweight Championship (1 time)
- Premier Wrestling Federation

- PWF Unified Tag Team Championship (1 time) – with Minoru Fujita

- Kohaku Wrestling Wars

- UWA World Tag Team Championship (1 time) – with Menso-re Oyaji

- Michinoku Pro Wrestling

- Independent World Junior Heavyweight Championship (1 time)
- Tohoku Tag Team Championship (1 time) – with Minoru Fujita
- UWA World Tag Team Championship (1 time) – with Minoru Fujita

- Pro Wrestling Noah

- GHC Junior Heavyweight Tag Team Championship (1 time) – with Minoru Fujita

- Pro Wrestling Wave
  - Wave Tag Team Championship (1 times ) – with Itsuki Aoki
- Pro Wrestling World-1

- PWF Universal Tag Team Championship (1 time) – with Minoru Fujita

- Pro Wrestling Zero1

- NWA Intercontinental Tag Team Championship (2 times) – with Minoru Fujita (1) and Munenori Sawa (1)
- NWA International Lightweight Tag Team Championship (7 times) – with Dick Togo (1), Minoru Fujita (1), Munenori Sawa (1), Takafumi Ito (1), Hayato Fujita (1), Takuya Sugawara (1) and Fuminori Abe (1)
- NWA United National Heavyweight Championship (1 time)
- ZERO1-MAX International Junior Heavyweight Championship (Note: His first reign as champion was known as AWA/ZERO1-MAX/UPW/WORLD-1 International Junior Heavyweight Championship and second his reign was known as the AWA World Junior Heavyweight Championship.) (5 times)
- Tenkaichi Junior (2009, 2010, 2015)

- Tokyo Sports
  - Best Tag Team Award (2005) - with Minoru Fujita
- Wrestling of Darkness 666
  - 666 Disorder Openweight Championship (1 time)
  - Battle Royal (2022)
- Other Accomplishments
  - Tenku Cup Mixed Tag Tournament (2023) – with Itsuki Aoki

== Mixed martial arts record ==
Professional record breakdown
1 match	0 wins	1 loss
By submission	0	1

Res.	Record	Opponent	Method	Event	Date	Round	Time	Location	Notes
Loss	0-1	Takafumi Ito	Submission (rear naked choke)	DEEP - 5th Impact	June 9, 2002	2	1:54	Tokyo, Japan	
