= Tenkaichi Junior =

Annual professional wrestling tournament

Tenkaichi Junior (天下一Jr., Tenkaichi Junior) is an annual professional wrestling round-robin tournament held by Pro Wrestling Zero1 to determine the top junior heavyweight wrestler in the promotion, typically contested in late November/December. In addition to Zero1 members, it has frequently included outside stars, mainly freelancers performing in the Japanese independent scene.

The tournament has lately been presented as featuring two blocks, each with five participants, with the two block winners facing off in the final to determine the overall champion. In 2002, from 2006 to 2016, and between 2018 and 2019, the tournament featured only knock-out stages.

== Results ==
=== List of winners ===
Year	Winner	Total won	Ref
2002	Wataru Sakata	1	
2004	Tatsuhito Takaiwa	1	
2005	Yoshihito Sasaki	1	
2006	Minoru Fujita	1	
2007	Masato Tanaka	1	
2008	Tatsuhiro Takaiwa	2	
2009	Ikuto Hidaka	1	
2010	Ikuto Hidaka	2	
2011	Munenori Sawa	1	
2012	Jonathan Gresham	1	
2013	Hub	1	
2015	Ikuto Hidaka	3	
2016	Takuya Sugawara	1	
2017	Sean Guinness	1	
2018	Sugi	1	
2019	Hub	2	
2020	Shoki Kitamura	1	
2021	Fuminori Abe	1	
2022	Shoki Kitamura	2	
2023	Ryo Hoshino	1	
2025	Veny	1	
2026	Van Vert Jack	1	

=== 2002 ===
The inaugural edition of the tournament was held between November 15 and December 15, 2002.

First round
Wataru Sakata	KO
Ikuto Hidaka	8:27
Yoshihito Sasaki	10:38
Dick Togo	Pin
Kazuhiko Ogasawara	KO
C. W. Anderson	5:39
Tatsuhito Takaiwa	13:20
Naohiro Hoshikawa	Pin

Quarterfinals
Low Ki	12:17
Wataru Sakata	Pin
Dick Togo	N/A
Bye
Kazuhiko Ogasawara	N/A
Bye
Naohiro Hoshikawa	Pin
Frankie	9:59

Semifinals
Wataru Sakata	Dec
Dick Togo	12:06
Kazuhiko Ogasawara	6:45
Naohiro Hoshikawa	Pin

Finals
Wataru Sakata	Pin
Naohiro Hoshikawa	15:56

=== 2004 ===
The 2004 edition of the tournament took place between April 8 and April 30.

Final standings
Block A		Block B	
Tatsuhito Takaiwa	8	Tomohiro Ishii	6
Low Ki	6	Wataru Sakata	5
Ikuto Hidaka	4	Jun Kasai	5
Naohiro Hoshikawa	2	Leonardo Spanky	4
Osamu Namiguchi	0	Zebraman	0

Block A	Takaiwa	Low Ki	Hidaka	Hoshikawa	Namiguchi
Takaiwa	—N/a	Takaiwa (15:38)	Takaiwa (17:19)	Takaiwa (15:40)	Takaiwa (11:00)
Low Ki	Takaiwa (15:38)	—N/a	Low Ki (12:33)	Low Ki (15:04)	Low Ki (3:49)
Hidaka	Takaiwa (17:19)	Low Ki (12:33)	—N/a	Hidaka (10:12)	Hidaka (10:40)
Hoshikawa	Takaiwa (15:40)	Low Ki (15:04)	Hidaka (10:12)	—N/a	Hoshikawa (7:28)
Namiguchi	Takaiwa (11:00)	Low Ki (3:49)	Hidaka (10:40)	Hoshikawa (7:28)	—N/a
Block B	Ishii	Sakata	Kasai	Spanky	Zebraman
Ishii	—N/a	Sakata (11:29)	Ishii (14:01)	Ishii (10:59)	Ishii (7:00)
Sakata	Sakata (11:29)	—N/a	Draw (9:03)	Spanky (8:59)	Sakata (7:52)
Kasai	Ishii (14:01)	Draw (9:03)	—N/a	Kasai (10:31)	Kasai (9:49)
Spanky	Ishii (10:59)	Spanky (8:59)	Kasai (10:31)	—N/a	Spanky (3:58)
Zebraman	Ishii (7:00)	Sakata (7:52)	Kasai (9:49)	Spanky (3:58)	—N/a

Final
A1	Tatsuhito Takaiwa	Pin
B1	Tomohiro Ishii	16:39

=== 2005 ===
The 2005 edition of the tournament took place between May 20 and May 29.

Final standings
Block A		Block B	
Yoshihito Sasaki	5	Takehiro Murahama	8
Tatsuhito Takaiwa	5	Ikuto Hidaka	6
Minoru Fujita	4	Alex Shelley	4
Gamma	3	Psycho	4
Danshoku Dino	3	Osamu Namiguchi	0

Block A	Sasaki	Takaiwa	Fujita	Gamma	Dino
Sasaki	—N/a	Takaiwa (16:34)	Sasaki (18:47)	Sasaki (13:54)	Draw (13:37)
Takaiwa	Takaiwa (16:34)	—N/a	Fujita (18:13)		Draw (12:34)
Fujita	Sasaki (18:47)	Fujita (18:13)	—N/a	Gamma (11:52)	Fujita (9:41)
Gamma	Sasaki (13:54)		Gamma (11:52)	—N/a	Draw (8:44)
Dino	Draw (13:37)	Draw (12:34)	Fujita (9:41)	Draw (8:44)	—N/a
Block B	Murahama	Hidaka	Shelley	Psycho	Namiguchi
Murahama	—N/a	Murahama (9:01)	Murahama (7:11)	Murahama (9:38)	Murahama (9:51)
Hidaka	Murahama (9:01)	—N/a	Shelley (13:58)	Hidaka (9:21)	Hidaka (12:12)
Shelley	Murahama (7:11)	Shelley (13:58)	—N/a	Psycho (9:52)	Shelley (8:45)
Psycho	Murahama (9:38)	Hidaka (9:21)	Psycho (9:52)	—N/a	Psycho (8:48)
Namiguchi	Murahama (9:51)	Hidaka (12:12)	Shelley (8:45)	Psycho (8:48)	—N/a

Semifinal
A1	Yoshihito Sasaki	Pin
A2	Tatsuhito Takaiwa	12:41
B1	Takehiro Murahama	Pin
B2	Ikuto Hidaka	9:01

Final
A1	Yoshihito Sasaki	Pin
B1	Takehiro Murahama	19:44

=== 2006 ===
The 2006 edition of the tournament took place between August 24 and 26. The finals of the edition were also disputed for the vacant Zero1 International Junior Heavyweight Championship.

First round
Gentaro	Pin
Billy Moreno	7:47
Aussie Ozbone	7:18
Yoshihito Sasaki	Pin

Quarterfinals
Gentaro	14:42
Tatsuhito Takaiwa	Pin
Minoru Fujita	Pin
Ikuto Hidaka	1:00
Chris Sabin	Pin
Alex Shelley	19:01
Takuya Sugawara	Pin
Yoshihito Sasaki	13:02

Semifinals
Tatsuhiko Takaiwa	10:54
Minoru Fujita	Pin
Chris Sabin	10:52
Takuya Sugawara	Pin

Finals
Minoru Fujita	Pin
Takuya Sugawara	20:48

=== 2007 ===
The 2007 edition of the tournament took place between September 25 and September 30.

First round
Ikuto Hidaka	Pin
Takuya Sugawara	15:42
Munenori Sawa	Pin
Chad Malenko	11:50

Quarterfinals
Ikuto Hidaka	Pin
Katsushi Takemura	15:45
Minoru Fujita	20:10
Masaaki Mochizuki	Pin
Masato Tanaka	Pin
Naoki Tanizaki	14:27
Dick Togo	Pin
Munenori Sawa	13:31

Semifinals
Ikuto Hidaka	10:18
Masaaki Mochizuki	Pin
Masato Tanaka	Pin
Dick Togo	12:07

Finals
Masaaki Mochizuki	18:00
Masato Tanaka	Pin

=== 2008 ===
The 2008 edition of the tournament took place between October 28 and November 8. The tournament was divided in two separate competitions, the Tenkaichi Primary which took place on the very first date of the event, and the greater tournament which followed the normal schedule of the competition

==== Tenkaichi Primary ====
Quarterfinals
Kimbos Rice	Pin
Keita Yano	6:36
Ken Saito	6:14
Durango	Pin
Osamu Namiguchi	Pin
Naruto	1:40
Ya Ya Brazil	7:40
Munenori Sawa	Pin

Semifinals
Kimbos Rice	Pin
Durango	8:53
Osamu Namiguchi	11:15
Munenori Sawa	Pin

Finals
Kimbos Rice (Note: Rice and Sawa qualified for the greater tournament from these positions.)	N/A
Munenori Sawa	N/A

==== Tenkaichi ====
Quarterfinals
Kimbos Rice	12:19
Minoru Fujita	Pin
Ikuto Hidaka	24:16
Minoru	Pin
Tatsuhito Takaiwa	Pin
The Great Sasuke	12:48
Takuya Sugawara	8:17
Munenori Sawa	Pin

Semifinals
Minoru Fujita	11:57
Minoru	Pin
Tatsuhito Takaiwa	Pin
Munenori Sawa	14:20

Finals
Minoru	Pin
Tatsuhito Takaiwa	20:48

=== 2009 ===
The 2009 edition of the tournament took place between November 19 and 29. The finals of the edition were also disputed for the vacant Zero1 International Junior Heavyweight Championship.

First round
Hayato Fujita	Pin
Munenori Sawa	17:49
Akira Tozawa	12:14
Takuya Sugawara	Pin

Quarterfinals
Hayato Fujita	Pin
Hajime Ohara	10:24
Magnitude Kishiwada	11:02
Ikuto Hidaka	Pin
Sonjay Dutt	Pin
Minoru Fujita	11:02
Prince Devitt	Pin
Takuya Sugawara	7:24

Semifinals
Hayato Fujita	Pin
Ikuto Hidaka	13:25
Sonjay Dutt	11:37
Prince Devitt	Pin

Finals
Ikuto Hidaka	Pin
Prince Devitt	20:17

=== 2010 ===
The 2010 edition of the event took place between September 14 and 19.

First round
Sonjay Dutt	Pin
Madoka	13:12
Yuzuru Saito	11:08
Munenori Sawa	KO

Quarterfinals
Sonjay Dutt	11:00
Kaijin Habu Otoko	Pin
Takuya Sugawara	22:23
Minoru Fujita	Pin
Ikuto Hidaka	Pin
Hikaru Sato	19:16
Tyson Dux	8:38
Munenori Sawa	Pin

Semifinals
Kaijin Habu Otoko	Pin
Minoru Fujita	10:49
Ikuto Hidaka	KO
Munenori Sawa	13:48

Finals
Kaijin Habu Otoko	18:17
Ikuto Hidaka	Pin

=== 2011 ===
The 2011 edition of the tournament took place between September 13 and 17.

First round
Super Crazy	Pin
Ikuto Hidaka	14:20
Kaijin Habu Otoko	15:04
Takuya Sugawara	Pin

Quarterfinals
Super Crazy	8:50
Mineo Fujita	Pin
Robby Heart	9:01
Hayato Fujita	Pin
Susumu Yokosuka	Pin
Takafumi Ito	8:15
Munenori Sawa	Pin
Takuya Sugawara	14:22

Semifinals
Mineo Fujita	17:49
Hayato Fujita	Pin
Susumu Yokosuka	13:05
Munenori Sawa	Pin

Finals
Hayato Fujita	16:03
Munenori Sawa	Pin

=== 2012 ===
The 2012 edition of the tournament took place between September 12 and 17.

Round of 32
Frank David	9:44
Phil Boyd	Pin
Craig Classic	8:52
Daichi Hashimoto	Pin
Sicodelico Jr.	Pin
Mineo Fujita	8:33
Jason New	9:02
Jonathan Gresham	Pin
Ikuto Hidaka	Pin
Takafumi Ito	3:25
Ho Ho Lun	8:22
Sean Guinness	Pin
Kaijin Habu Otoko	Pin
Menso-re Oyaji	10:23
Genki Horiguchi	Pin
Robby Heart	9:41

Round of 16
Tstsuhito Takaiwa	Pin
Phil Boyd	12:06
Daichi Hashimoto
Bye	N/A
Sicodelico Jr.	10:04
Jonathan Gresham	Pin
Ikuto Hidaka	Pin
Sean Guinness	13:21
Kaijin Habu Otoko
Bye	N/A
Genki Horiguchi	Pin
Takuya Sugawara	10:16

Quarterfinals
Daichi Hashimoto	9:02
Jonathan Gresham	Pin
Ikuto Hidaka	Pin
Genki Horiguchi	8:23

Semifinals
Jonathan Gresham	Pin
Ikuto Hidaka	24:12

Finals

=== 2013 ===
The 2013 edition of the tournament took place between September 9 and 16. The finals of the edition were also disputed for Mineo Fujita's Zero1 International Junior Heavyweight Championship

Round 1
Hub	Pin
Onryo	11:12
Yo-Hey
Ikuto Hidaka	Pin
Billy Ken Kid	Pin
El Hijo del Pantera	10:31
Takuya Sugawara	10:51
Jason Lee	Pin
Mineo Fujita	Pin
Jack Anthony	8:21
Manabu Suruga	6:40
Hartley Jackson	Pin
Tigers Mask	Pin
Menso-re Oyaji	9:42

Quarterfinals
Hub	Pin
Ikuto Hidaka	9:59
Billy Ken Kid	8:58
Jason Lee	Pin
Mineo Fujita	Pin
Hartley Jackson	3:16
Tigers Mask	Pin
Jonathan Gresham	8:59

Semifinals
Hub	Pin
Jason Lee	11:01
Mineo Fujita	Pin
Tigers Mask	9:13

Final
Hub	Pin
Mineo Fujita	21:02

=== 2015 ===
The 2015 edition took place between June 29 and July 16.

Round 1
Takuya Sugawara	Pin
Hercules Senga	5:33
Jason Lee	7:30
Shunma Katsumata	Pin
Takafumi Ito	8:05
Yuko Miyamoto	Pin
Tatsuhito Takaiwa	Pin
Psycho	9:02
Kenbai	Pin
Isami Kodaka	9:53
Hayato Fujita	Pin
Kotaro Nasu	7:12
Manabu Hara	10:49
Brother Yasshi	Pin
Naoki Tanizaki	Pin
Mineo Fujita	10:24
Eisa8	Pin
Wild Cat	9:45
Kaz Hayashi	20:20
Ikuto Hidaka	Pin

Round 2
Takuya Sugawara	Pin
Shunma Katsumata	7:30
Eisa8	10:21
Ikuto Hidaka	Pin

Quarterfinals
Takuya Sugawara	Pin
Yuko Miyamoto	10:41
Tatsuhito Takaiwa	9:14
Isami Kodaka	Pin
Hayato Fujita	Pin
Brother Yasshi	7:59
Naoki Tanizaki	9:49
Ikuto Hidaka	Pin

Semifinals
Takuya Sugawara	15:42
Isami Kodaka	Pin
Hayato Fujita	18:52
Ikuto Hidaka	Pin

Final
Isami Kodaka	23:54
Ikuto Hidaka	Pin

=== 2016 ===
The 2016 edition of the tournament took place between September 20 and 29.

- First rounds (September 20)
  - Ikuto Hidaka defeated Takuya Nomura (10:32)
  - Isami Kodaka defeated Shinya Ishida (9:52)
  - Takuya Sugawara defeated Último Dragón (12:10)
  - Tatsuhito Takaiwa defeated Masashi Takeda (12:02)
- Second rounds (September 20)
  - Kotaro Suzuki defeated Ikuto Hidaka (17:11)
  - Tatsuhito Takaiwa defeated Hayato Fujita (12:30)
- Semifinals (September 29)
  - Kotaro Suzuki defeated Tatsuhito Takaiwa (11:15)
  - Takuya Sugawara defeated Isami Kodaka (9:15)
- Finals (September 29)
  - Takuya Sugawara defeated Kotaro Suzuki (15:21)

=== 2017 ===
The 2017 edition took place between April 4 and 26.

Final standings
Block A		Block B	
Sean Guinness	5	Kotaro Suzuki	6
Shinjiro Otani	5	Tatsuhito Takaiwa	4
Hayato Fujita	4	Koji Kanemoto	4
Takuya Sugawara	3	Takumi Tsukamoto	3
Minoru Tanaka	3	Ikuto Hidaka	2

Block A	Guinness	Otani	Fujita	Sugawara	Tanaka
Guinness	—N/a	Guinness (12:12)	N/A	Draw (20:00)	Guinness (12:41)
Otani	Guinness (12:12)	—N/a	Otani (16:02)	Otani (4:12)	Tanaka (11:24)
Fujita	N/A	Otani (16:02)	—N/a	Fujita (8:05)	Draw (20:00)
Sugawara	Draw (20:00)	Otani (4:12)	Fujita (8:05)	—N/a	N/A
Tanaka	Guinness (12:41)	Tanaka (11:24)	Draw (20:00)	N/A	—N/a
Block B	Takaiwa	Suzuki	Kanemoto	Tsukamoto	Hidaka
Takaiwa	—N/a	Suzuki (4:10)	Takaiwa (11:40)	N/A	Takaiwa (12:46)
Suzuki	Suzuki (4:10)	—N/a	Kanemoto (3:53)	Suzuki (7:12)	Suzuki (5:38)
Kanemoto	Takaiwa (11:40)	Kanemoto (3:53)	—N/a	Tsukamoto (3:33)	Kanemoto (11:31)
Tsukamoto	N/A	Suzuki (7:12)	Tsukamoto (3:33)	—N/a	Hidaka (10:07)
Hidaka	Takaiwa (12:46)	Suzuki (5:38)	Kanemoto (11:31)	Hidaka (10:07)	—N/a

Semifinal
A1	Sean Guinness	Pin
A2	Shinjiro Otani	8:30
B1	Kotaro Suzuki	Pin
B2	Tatsuhito Takaiwa	8:46

Final
A1	Sean Guinness	Pin
B1	Kotaro Suzuki	17:31

=== 2018 ===
The 2018 edition of the tournament took place between November 17 and 24. The finals were also disputed for the vacant Zero1 World Junior Heavyweight Championship and International Junior Heavyweight Championship.

First round
Tatsuhito Takaiwa	Pin
Yuya Aoki	10:21
Rocky Kawamura	8:25
Hayata	Pin

Second round
Tatsuhito Takaiwa	12:23
Sugi	Pin
Takuya Sugawara	20:00
Asuka (Note: Asuka defeated Sugawara in a decision match later on that night to move up to the semifinals.)	Draw
Fuminori Abe	Pin
Ikuto Hidaka	14:13
Hayata	Pin
Hagane Shinno	13:50

Semifinals
Sugi	Pin
Asuka	5:34
Fuminori Abe	8:09
Hayata	Pin

Finals
Sugi	Pin
Hayata	15:26

=== 2019 ===
The 2019 edition of the tournament took place between September 1 and 14.

First round
Hub	Pin
Fuminori Abe	11:56
Hide Kubota	8:44
Mao	Pin

Second round
Hub	Pin
Ikuto Hidaka	0:57
Shoki Kitamura
Tatsuhito Takaiwa	Pin
Raicho	10:14
Sugi	Pin
Mao
Sean Guinness	Pin

Semifinals
Hub	Pin
Tatsuhito Takaiwa	8:27
Sugi	Pin
Sean Guinness	8:39

Finals
Hub	Pin
Sugi	12:22

=== 2020 ===
The 2020 edition of the tournament took place between July 5 and August 2.

- First rounds (July 5)
  - Yumehito Imanari defeated Shinjiro Otani (0:22)
  - Shoki Kitamura defeated Drew Parker (13:02)
  - Shinjiro Otani vs. Yumehito Imanari ended in a time-limit draw (20:00)
- Second rounds (July 19–25)
  - Shoki Kitamura defeated Hide Kubota (12:57)
  - El Lindaman defeated Ganseki Tanaka (11:34)
  - Raicho defeated Sugi (10:54)
  - Hub defeated Yumehito Imanari (15:28)
- Semifinals (July 16)
  - Shoki Kitamura defeated Raicho (11:58)
  - El Lindaman defeated Hub (11:14)
- Finals (July 26)
- Shoki Kitamura defeated El Lindaman (18:57)

=== 2021 ===
The 2021 edition of the tournament took place between August 24 and September 9. The finals were also disputed for the vacant Zero1 World Junior Heavyweight Championship and International Junior Heavyweight Championship.

- First rounds (August 24)
  - Junta Miyawaki defeated Takumi Baba (11:57)
  - Fuminori Abe defeated Ricky Fuji (9:56)
  - Leo Isaka defeated Genta Hiriki (10:41)
  - Shoki Kitamura defeated Arata (10:58)
- Second rounds (September 4)
  - Junta Miyawaki defeated Andy Wu (12:50)
  - Hide Kubota defeated Leo Isaka (15:09)
- Semifinals (September 9)
  - Shoki Kitamura defeated Junta Miyawaki (12:10)
  - Fuminori Abe defeated Hide Kubota (8:17)
- Finals (September 9)
  - Fuminori Abe defeated Shoki Kitamura (15:00)

=== 2022 ===
The 2022 edition of the tournament took place between September 9 and October 19.

Final standings
Block A		Block B	
Shoki Kitamura	15	Tatsuhito Takaiwa	15
Jun Masaoka	10	Takumi Baba	10
Leo Isaka	10	Takuro Niki	10
Yoshikazu Yokoyama	8	Andy Wu	10
Astroman	8	Yasu Kubota	5

Block A	Kitamura	Masaoka	Isaka	Yokoyama	Astroman
Kitamura	—N/a	Kitamura (10:15)	Isaka (15:39)	Kitamura (13:52)	Kitamura (15:59)
Masaoka	Kitamura (10:15)	—N/a	N/A	Yokoyama (11:29)	Masaoka (11:41)
Isaka	Isaka (15:39)	N/A	—N/a	Isaka (3:30)	Astroman (10:25)
Yokoyama	Kitamura (13:52)	Yokoyama (11:29)	Isaka (3:30)	—N/a	Draw (9:46)
Astroman	Kitamura (15:59)	Masaoka (11:41)	Astroman (10:25)	Draw (9:46)	—N/a
Block B	Takaiwa	Baba	Niki	Wu	Kubota
Takaiwa	—N/a	Takaiwa (16:41)	Takaiwa (8:47)	Takaiwa (11:01)	Kubota (11:30)
Baba	Takaiwa (16:41)	—N/a	Niki (12:52)	N/A	Baba (12:28)
Niki	Takaiwa (8:47)	Niki (12:52)	—N/a	Wu	N/A
Wu	Takaiwa (11:01)	N/A	Wu	—N/a	Wu (8:43)
Kubota	Kubota (11:30)	Baba (12:28)	N/A	Wu (8:43)	—N/a

Final
A1	Tatsuhito Takaiwa	Pin
B1	Shoki Kitamura	21:00

=== 2023 ===
The 2023 edition of the tournament took place between September 22 and October 27.

Round of 16
Shingo	Pin
Leo Isaka	9:54
Ryo Hoshino	Pin
Kenichiro Arai	6:25
Takumi Baba	9:12
Astro Black	Pin
Hikaru Sato	Pin
Shoki Kitamura	20:00
Bambeat	Pin
Takumi Saito	7:33

Quarterfinals
Hikaru Sato	10:19
Bambeat	Count-out

Semifinals
Ryo Hoshino	Pin
Astro Black	12:01
Shingo	Pin
Bambeat	14:59

Finals
Ryo Hoshino	Pin
Shingo	23:38

=== 2025 ===
The 2025 edition of the tournament took place between October 10 and 17.

First round
Mikiya Sasaki	13:24
Shota	Pin
Yuki Toki	Pin
Convoy Nishio	7:32

Quarterfinals
Veny	Countout
Hide Kubota	2:20
Shota	12:24
Kidd Bandit	Pin
Yuki Toki	Pin
Tatsuhito Takaiwa	12:58
Ali Najima	9:13
Kota Sekifuda	Pin

Semifinals
Veny	Pin
Kidd Bandit	11:22
Yuki Toki	Pin
Kota Sekifuda	16:28

Finals
Veny	Pin
Yuki Toki	15:20

=== 2026 ===
The 2026 edition of the tournament took place between September 21 and October 10.

Round 1
Bryan Ishizaka	8:49
Sho Mizuno	Pin
Reiya Igarashi	11:40
Seigo Tachibana	Pin
Yuki Toki	Pin
Hide Kubota	6:06
Takuya Sugawara	6:49
Kosuke Sato	Pin

Quarterfinals
Naruki Doi	Pin
Sho Mizuno	11:45
Seigo Tachibana	Bye
Yuki Toki	Bye
Kosuke Sato	11:07
Van Vert Jack	Pin

Semifinals
Naruki Doi	Pin
Seigo Tachibana	11:51
Yuki Toki	18:59
Van Vert Jack	Pin

Final
Naruki Doi	18:22
Van Vert Jack	Pin

== See also ==
- Jr. Battle of Glory
- Best of the Super Juniors
- Global Junior Heavyweight League
