= Dick Togo =

Japanese professional wrestler

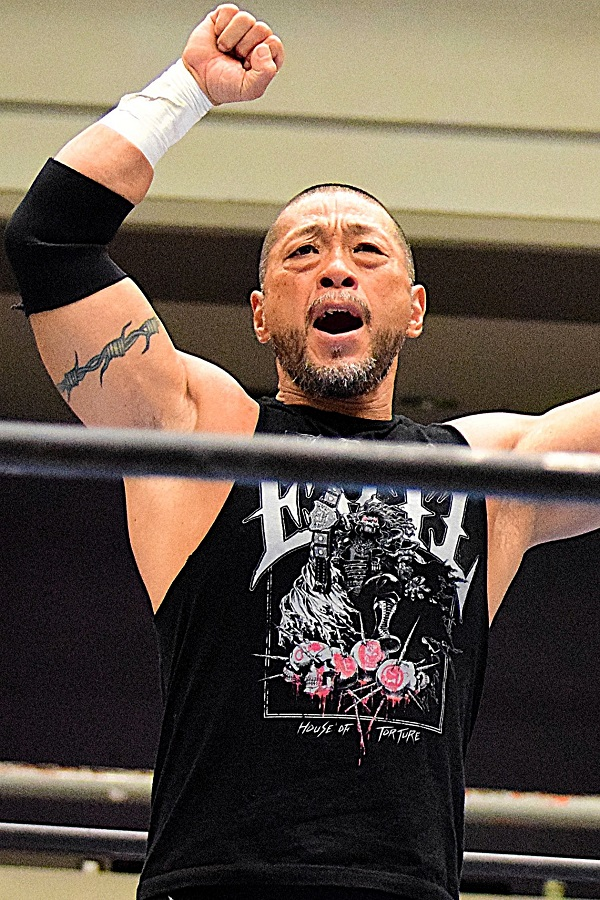
- Togo in 2023

Personal information
- Born: Shigeki Sato (佐藤 茂樹, Satō Shigeki); August 17, 1969 (age 57) Odate, Akita, Japan

Professional wrestling career
- Ring name(s): Cancun; Dickmoto; Dick Sato; Dick Togo; Duke Togo; Flash Dick; Francesco Togo; Francis Togo; Gantetsu; Gantetsu Sakigake; Kintaro Inferno; Ninja Warrior; P. Togo; Prince Togo; Revolucion; Rey Cubano; Roshi Togo; Sato; The Suiter; El Tigre de Tokyo; Togo
- Billed height: 1.70 m (5 ft 7 in)
- Billed weight: 90 kg (200 lb)
- Trained by: Gran Hamada
- Debut: June 5, 1991

Shigeki Sato (佐藤 茂樹, Satō Shigeki; born August 17, 1969), better known by his ring name Dick Togo (ディック東郷, Dikku Tōgō), is a Japanese professional wrestler. Togo works for New Japan Pro-Wrestling (NJPW), where he is a member of House of Torture.

Togo has spent the majority of his career as a freelancer, wrestling most notably for Michinoku Pro Wrestling and DDT Pro-Wrestling. Sato has wrestled under various ring names such as Francesco Togo, Rey Cubano and Prince Togo. Togo retired in September 2012, but returned to the ring in July 2016. In 2020, he began working for NJPW, acting as the manager for Evil, and in doing so, joining Bullet Club. A year later, Togo and Evil formed House of Torture, which was initially a sub-group, and became a stable in its own right, following a civil war storyline in 2025.

Togo has held the KO-D Openweight Championship four times, the IWGP Junior Heavyweight Tag Team Championship once with Taka Michinoku and the British Commonwealth Junior Heavyweight Championship once.

== Professional wrestling career ==
Sato has performed for numerous Japanese promotions as well as American promotions such as Extreme Championship Wrestling (ECW), the World Wrestling Federation (WWF) and Ring of Honor (ROH).

While in Michinoku Pro Wrestling, he formed a stable called Kai En Tai DX with Taka Michinoku, Shoichi Funaki, Men's Teioh and Shiryu; Togo, along with some of his Kai En Tai teammates, was briefly a member of The Blue World Order in ECW. Throughout his career, Togo has been a part of several stables in the Japanese independent circuit: most famously the original Kai En Tai in Michinoku Pro Wrestling, but also the Legion of Violence (LOV) in Osaka Pro Wrestling, with Black Buffalo and Daio Quällt, the Far East Connection with Gedo, Jado, Masao Orihara, and Ikuto Hidaka in various promotions; and most recently New Wrestling Aidoru (NωA) with Makoto Oishi, Mao and Shunma Katsumata in DDT.

In 2008, he debuted in the Argentinian promotion 100% Lucha, defeating Hip Hop Man. Then, he challenged Vicente Viloni for the 100% Lucha championship, winning the match. One week later, Viloni had a rematch and defeated Sato, retrieving the title

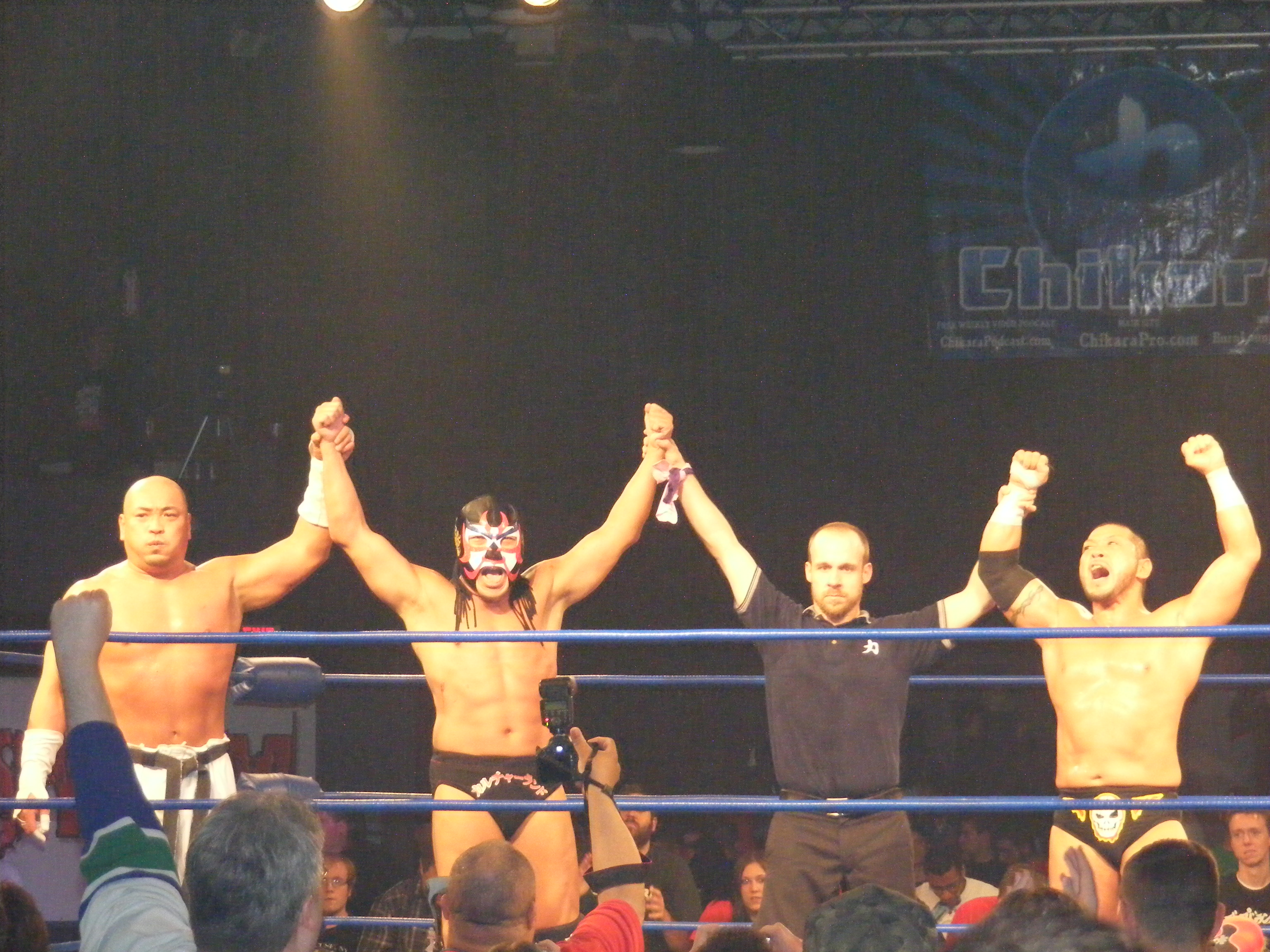
Togo, The Great Sasuke and Jinsei Shinzaki at Chikara King of Trios in April 2011.

In early 2011, Togo announced the start of his retirement tour as part of which he returned to the United States in April to take part in Chikara's 2011 King of Trios tournament, where he would team with The Great Sasuke and Jinsei Shinzaki as Team Michinoku Pro. On April 15, Team Michinoku Pro defeated Team Minnesota (1-2-3 Kid, Arik Cannon and Darin Corbin) in their first round match and followed that up by defeating Jigsaw, Manami Toyota and Mike Quackenbush in the following day's quarterfinals. On April 17, Team Michinoku Pro was eliminated from the tournament in the semifinal stage by F.I.S.T. (Chuck Taylor, Icarus and Johnny Gargano).

DDT held the Dick Togo Japanese Retirement Show at Korakuen Hall in Tokyo on June 30, 2011. In the main event Togo defeated Gedo in his final match in Japan. Afterwards he embarked on a retirement world tour, wrestling in countries such as Australia, Finland (Fight Club Finland), Germany, Belgium, England, Spain, and Italy. On December 3, Togo returned to the United States for the final leg of his tour, losing to Kudo in a three-way match, which also included Masahiro Takanashi at Combat Zone Wrestling's (CZW) Indie Summit event. On December 10, Togo wrestled for Pro Wrestling Guerrilla (PWG) in Reseda, Los Angeles, losing to PWG World Champion El Generico in a non-title match. On January 1, 2012, Togo returned to Mexico, wrestling at an independent event in Ciudad Nezahualcóyotl, where he, El Alebrije and El Hijo de Dr. Wagner, Jr. defeated Golden Bull, Histeria II and Puma in a six-man tag team match. The following July, Togo took his retirement tour to Bolivia. While working in Bolivia, Togo found his way back into a DDT storyline, when Yuki Sato arrived in the country with the Ironman Heavymetalweight Championship, which he then proceeded to lose to Togo. During the following week, Togo first lost the title to local wrestler Ajayu, before regaining it from a Bolivian child and then finally losing it back to Sato. Togo finished his retirement tour on September 9, 2012, in La Paz, Bolivia. In the final match of his career, Togo teamed with Antonio Honda, Daisuke Sasaki and Yasu Urano in an eight-man elimination tag team match, where they were defeated by Ajayu, Apocalipsis, Guerrero Ayar and Halcon Dorado, with Ajayu pinning Togo for the win.

On May 29, 2015, Togo announced he was opening a wrestling school in Vietnam, named Vietnam Pro-Wrestling Academy. The school is affiliated with Vietnam's first professional wrestling promotion, New Vietnam Prowrestling (NVP), which held its first event in August 2015.

On June 5, 2016, Togo announced he was coming out of retirement. His return match took place at a DDT show on July 3.

On December 10, 2016, Togo competed in the main event of Evolve Wrestling's Evolve 74 show, defeating Chris Hero.

On July 12, 2020, at Dominion in Osaka-jo Hall, Togo joined New Japan Pro-Wrestling (NJPW), aligning himself with Bullet Club, by helping Evil capture the IWGP Heavyweight and Intercontinental Championships. He debuted eight days later in a 6-man tag team main event, as "The Spoiler". Togo, Evil and Taiji Ishimori defeated Los Ingobernables de Japón's Hiromu Takahashi, Tetsuya Naito and Bushi.

== Championships and accomplishments ==
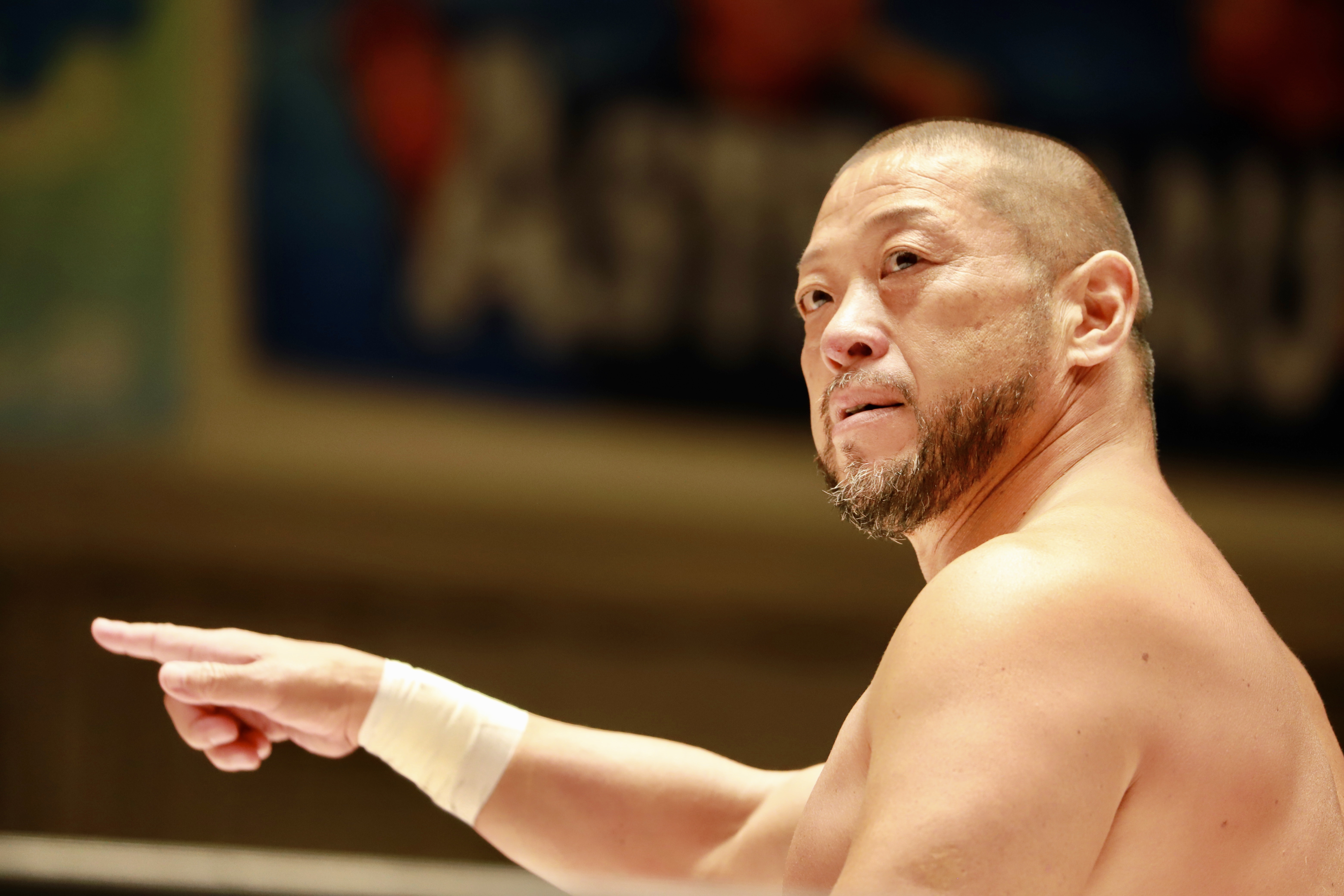
Togo in March 2020

- 100% Lucha
  - Campeonato de 100% Lucha (1 time)
- Dramatic Dream Team/DDT Pro-Wrestling
  - Ironman Heavymetalweight Championship (4 times)
  - KO-D Openweight Championship (4 times)
  - KO-D Tag Team Championship (3 times) – with Nobutaka Moribe (1), Antonio Honda (1) and Taka Michinoku (1)
- El Dorado Wrestling
  - Treasure Hunters Tag Team Tournament (2006) – with Shuji Kondo
  - UWA World Trios Championship (1 time) – with Piza Michinoku and Antonio Honda
- Guts World Pro Wrestling
  - GWC 6-Man Tag Team Championship (2 times) – with Ryan Upin and Yuki Sato (1), and Masao Orihara and Ryan Upin (1)
- Japan Indie Awards
  - Best Bout Award (2011) vs. Kota Ibushi on March 27
- Michinoku Pro Wrestling
  - British Commonwealth Junior Heavyweight Championship (1 time)
  - Tohoku Junior Heavyweight Championship (1 time)
  - Tohoku Tag Team Championship (1 time) – with The Great Sasuke
  - UWA/UWF Intercontinental Tag Team Championship (1 time) – with Gedo
  - Michinoku Pro Tag League (1996) – with Men's Teioh
  - Futaritabi Tag Team League (2003) – with Masao Orihara
- New Japan Pro-Wrestling
  - IWGP Junior Heavyweight Tag Team Championship (1 time) – with Taka Michinoku
- Osaka Pro Wrestling
  - 1st Year Anniversary Celebration Tag Tournament (2000) – with Black Buffalo
  - Osaka Pro Wrestling Championship (1 time)
- Pro Wrestling Illustrated
  - Ranked #122 of the top 500 singles wrestlers in the PWI 500 in 1999
  - Ranked #399 of the 500 best singles wrestlers of the PWI Years in 2003
- Pro Wrestling Zero1-Max
  - AWA World Junior Heavyweight Championship (1 time)
  - NWA International Lightweight Tag Team Championship (1 time) – with Ikuto Hidaka
  - NWA International Lightweight Tag Team Titles Tournament (2003) – with Ikuto Hidaka
- Universal Lucha Libre
  - UWF Super Welterweight Championship (1 time)
- Tokyo Gurentai
  - Tokyo Intercontinental Tag Team Championship (2 times) – with Shiryu (1), Mazada (1)
