= El Lindaman =

Japanese professional wrestler (born 1995)

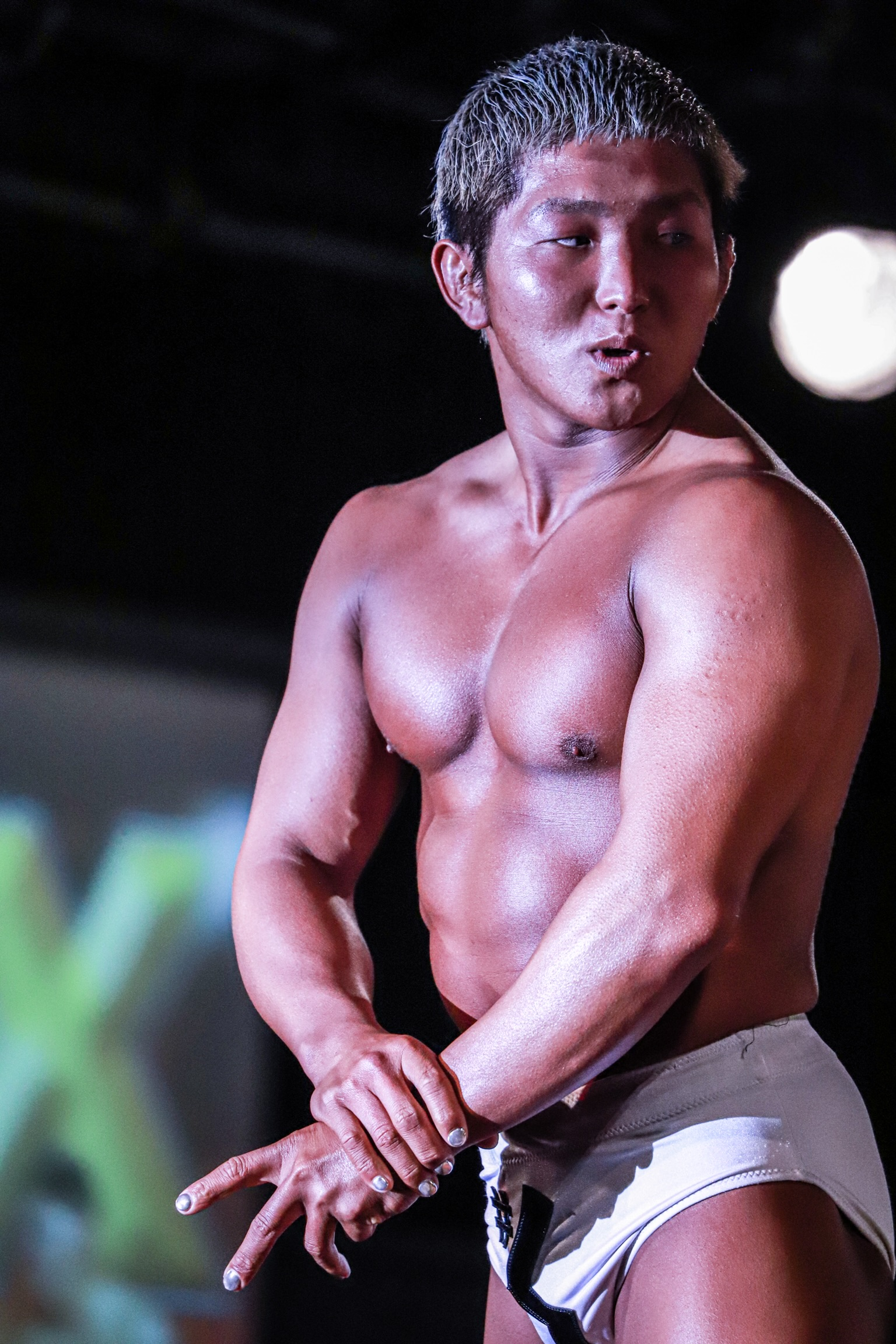
- El Lindaman in January 2022

Personal information
- Born: Yuga Hayashi (林悠河, Hayashi Yūga); February 12, 1995 (age 31) Nakano, Tokyo, Japan

Professional wrestling career
- Ring name(s): El Lindaman; Yuga Hayashi
- Billed height: 1.61 m (5 ft 3 in)
- Billed weight: 70 kg (154 lb)
- Trained by: Dragon Gate Dojo
- Debut: April 4, 2014

Yuga Hayashi (林悠河, Hayashi Yūga; born February 12, 1995), better known by his ring name El Lindaman (エル・リンダマン, Eru Rindaman), is a Japanese professional wrestler. He is currently working for Gleat, where he was the former two-time and inaugural G-Rex Champion. He also makes appearances for Japanese Promotions All Japan Pro Wrestling (AJPW). He is best known for his time in Dragon Gate.

== Professional wrestling career ==
=== Dragon Gate ===
==== Millennials (2014–2015) ====
Hayashi debuted on April 4, 2014, losing to Shachihoko Boy in a dark match. On April 13, during a match against Eita, Hayashi suffered a broken jaw, derailing his early career and leaving him out of action for several months. After his return, Hayashi lost the majority of matches he competed in during his early career, common for young wrestlers in Japan. On January 16, 2015, he competed in his last match under his birth name, teaming with Super Shisa and Kotoka in a loss to the Jimmyz (Jimmy Kagetora, Genki Horiguchi H.A.Gee.Mee!! and Ryo Jimmy Saito). Two days later on January 18, Hayashi debuted a new ring name, competing as El Lindaman (inspired by the song Linda Linda by The Blue Hearts). He initially wanted to join Osaka06 alongside Cima and Gamma, but after Cima joined Mad Blankey, Hayashi instead chose to join the Millennials, changing his attire to match the Millennial colour scheme and dyeing his hair pink. In his first match as Lindaman, he and Kotoka lost to Jimmy Kanda and Jimmy Susumu.

==== Over Generation (2015–2016) ====
On October 8, 2015, Lindaman joined Cima's new Over Generation stable alongside Eita, Gamma, Punch Tominaga, Kaito Ishida and Takehiro Yamamura. After joining the Over Generation, Lindaman again changed his attire. In November, Lindaman competed in the Open The Triangle Gate Tournament, teaming with Eita and Punch Tominaga. The trio were eliminated in the first round by VerserK (Yamato, Shingo Takagi and Naruki Doi). Lindaman competed in the 2016 King Of Gate tournament, finishing last in his block with one point. In 2016, he began teaming with Yosuke Santa Maria, with the duo beginning a kayfabe romance angle after Lindaman said that he liked her and wanted "to fight with and protect her". The duo were officially named The Marilyns, and shortly after aligning himself with Maria, Lindaman left the Over Generation and asked to join Maria's Tribe Vanguard stable, led by Yamato. Yamato said that Lindaman joining the stable or not was dependent on his performance alongside Santa Maria in the 2016 Summer Adventure Tag League. Lindaman and Santa Maria entered the 2016 Summer Adventure Tag League, tying for last in their block with just two points, leading Yamato to declare that Lindaman would not be joining Tribe Vanguard. After Yamato denied his request, Santa Maria slapped Lindaman, officially breaking up The Marilyns.

==== VerserK (2016–2018) ====
Shortly after, Lindaman adopted a new character, attacking his opponents and partners before and after matches and showing signs of a heel turn. Lindaman challenged Eita to a match for the Open the Brave Gate Championship, however, Punch Tominaga came down to the ring and entered himself into the title picture, leading to a number one contenders match on September 29, won by Lindaman. After the match, he officially turned heel, attacking Tominaga and accepting VerserK's offer to join their stable. Lindaman again changed his look, dying his hair red, changing his ring attire to fit with VerserK's colours and carrying a large rope around his neck. Representing VerserK, Lindaman unsuccessfully challenged Eita for the championship on October 12. On December 25 at Final Gate, Lindaman teamed with fellow VerserK members Cyber Kong and Mondai Ryu, facing Ben-K, Kotoka and Masato Yoshino and the Jimmyz (Jimmy Kanda, Jimmy Susumu and Ryo Jimmy Saito) in a triple threat match for the vacant Open the Triangle Gate Championship, won by the Jimmyz. On January 18, Lindaman teamed with VerserK leader Shingo Takagi and T-Hawk to win the One Night 6 Man Tag Tournament. On July 1, Lindaman along with Shingo Takagi and Takashi Yoshida defeated MaxiMuM for the Open the Triangle Gate Championship, winning El Lindaman's first championship in Dragon Gate.

=== Oriental Wrestling Entertainment (2018–2021) ===
In early 2018, Cima announced his departure from Dragon Gate after 21 years working for the promotion, and also announced the formation of a new promotion, Oriental Wrestling Entertainment (OWE), to be primarily based in China. Aside from Cima; T-Hawk, El Lindaman, and Takehiro Yamamura also left Dragon Gate to join OWE. OWE's inaugural event was held on May 7. On June 22, representing OWE, Lindaman debuted in Wrestle-1. The rest of the OWE roster soon debuted in the promotion too, and named themselves "Strong Hearts", later recruiting Dezmond Xavier and Zachary Wentz to the group. Strong Hearts also debuted for DDT Pro Wrestling in September, defeating All Out (Konosuke Takeshita, Akito, Shunma Katsumata and Yuki Iino. Representing OWE, Strong Hearts debuted in All Elite Wrestling at Double or Nothing on May 25, 2019 losing to SoCal Uncensored.

=== New Japan Pro-Wrestling (2022) ===
On March 1, 2022, Lindaman made his New Japan Pro-Wrestling debut, along with CIMA and T-Hawk, at the NJPW 50th Anniversary Show, defeating Suzuki-gun's, El Desperado, Yoshinobu Kanemaru and Douki. They continued to team during CIMA's New Japan Cup campaign. On May 1, 2022, Lindaman was announced to be competing in the 29th annual Best of the Super Juniors representing GLEAT as a part of the B-Block. He finished with a record of 4 wins and 5 losses, resulting in 8 points, therefore failing to advance to the finals. On the tournament final's day, Lindaman, Wheeler Yuta, Ace Austin and Alex Zayne defeated Robbie Eagles, YOH, Titán and Clark Connors, in a tag-team match.

== Championships and accomplishments ==
- All Japan Pro Wrestling
  - World Junior Heavyweight Championship (1 time)
  - All Asia Tag Team Championship (1 time) – with T-Hawk
- DDT Pro-Wrestling
  - KO-D 6-Man Tag Team Championship (1 time) – with Tetsuya Endo & T-Hawk (1)
- Dragon Gate
  - New Year's Unit 6-Man Tag 1 Day Tournament (2017) – with Shingo Takagi & T-Hawk
  - Open the Triangle Gate Championship (1 time) – with Shingo Takagi & Takashi Yoshida (1)
- Gleat
  - G-Rex Championship (2 times, inaugural)
  - G-Rush Championship (1 time, inaugural)
  - G-REX Title First Champion Decision Tournament (2022)
  - G-Rush Tournament (2025)
- Pro Wrestling Illustrated
  - Ranked No. 119 of the top 500 singles wrestlers in the PWI 500 in 2023
- Pro Wrestling Zero1
  - International Junior Heavyweight Championship (1 time)
  - NWA World Junior Heavyweight Championship (1 time)
- Tokyo Sports
  - Technique Award (2022)
