= Naruki Doi =

Japanese wrestler (born 1980)

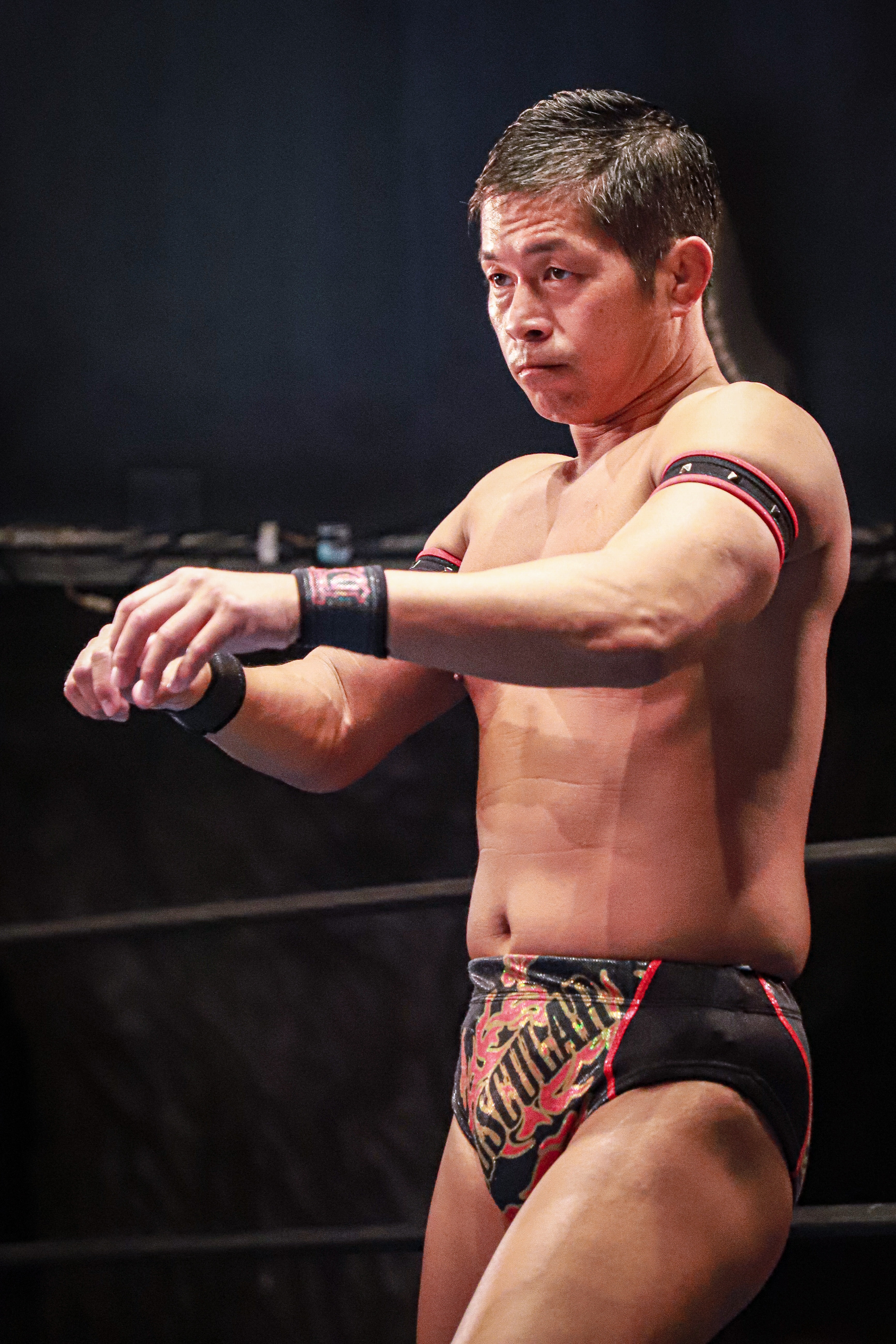
- Doi in July 2023

Personal information
- Born: October 4, 1980 (age 46) Ikoma, Nara, Japan

Professional wrestling career
- Ring name(s): Naruki Doi; Second Doi "Mr. Saito"
- Billed height: 1.73 m (5 ft 8 in)
- Billed weight: 82 kg (181 lb)
- Trained by: Último Dragón; Skayde
- Debut: May 13, 2000

Naruki Doi (土井 成樹, Doi Naruki; born October 4, 1980) is a Japanese professional wrestler currently performing for Dragon Gate, DDT Pro-Wrestling (DDT) and All Japan Pro-Wrestling (AJPW) as a freelancer. He also previous working for Ring of Honor (ROH) and Total Nonstop Action Wrestling (TNA); in the former promotion, he was a one-time ROH World Tag Team Champion with Shingo Takagi.

== Professional wrestling career ==
=== Toryumon (2000–2004) ===
Doi debuted in Toryumon Japan as part of the T2P. As one of his family members was a player for the Japanese baseball team the Yomiuri Giants, he was given a baseball gimmick and the name of Second Doi.

Doi was originally groomed as the top face for T2P, but injuries forced him to debut in Japan late and his growth was slightly stunted. He joined the Toryumon Japan roster, and Shin M2K as T2P ended its run, later joining Final M2K.

=== Dragon Gate (2004–present) ===
Doi continued on in Final M2K. At the end of 2004, he abruptly dropped the baseball gimmick and started competing under his real name.

In January 2005, Doi turned heel and joined CIMA's new faction Blood Generation. He gained more rank then, and rose to be something of a second-in-command for the stable. He also became the first Open the Brave Gate Champion on March 13, and would hold it until November 13, when he lost it to Dragon Kid.

On April 12, 2006, when Gamma was kicked out of Blood Generation due to constant clashes with CIMA, Doi left with Gamma, along with Masato Yoshino and Naoki Tanizaki. It was unclear whether Doi or Gamma was the leader of the splinter faction. After Doi and Gamma won the rights to the Blood Generation name in a tag match against CIMA and Don Fujii eleven days later, Doi's faction renounced it, renaming themselves the Muscle Outlaw'z. The MO'z ranks would grow when Magnitude Kishiwada joined them after returning from a stint of injury, as well as referee Kinta Tamaoka. The group would lose Tanisaki later that year, but shortly after recruited Genki Horiguchi. MO'z would also host any heel wrestlers visiting Dragon Gate.

Doi continued to gain rank in 2007, and formed a regular tag team with Masato Yoshino, known as Speed Muscle, an amalgamation of their respective nicknames "Speed Star" and "Bosou Muscle". Doi and Yoshino declared themselves the first Open the Twin Gate Champions after winning the inaugural Summer Adventure Tag League Tournament in June, and later defeated Taku Iwasa and Kenichiro Arai for the I-J Heavyweight Tag Team Championship to unify the two belts. In November, Doi and Yoshino added the GHC Junior Heavyweight Tag Team Championship to their collection. Doi and Yoshino would drop the GHC titles to Shingo Takagi and BxB Hulk of New Hazard in January 2008, and then the Open the Twin Gate titles to Iwasa and Arai the month after, and opted to stop teaming with each other. Doi briefly teamed with Horiguchi while Yoshino pursued CIMA and the Open the Dream Gate championship. Yoshino put forward an impressive performance, and despite losing, was congratulated by both CIMA and Doi. Their team reconciled.

Doi and Yoshino's increasing popularity began to cause a split in the Muscle Outlaw'z, as Yoshino began to feud with stablemate Yasushi Kanda. The MO'z eventually split, with the heel faction of Kanda, Horiguchi, Gamma and YAMATO joining up with Shingo Takagi and Cyber Kong to form Real Hazard. Doi and Yoshino formed their own new stable, World-1, that also included BxB Hulk, Naoki Tanizaki, and m.c. KZ.

In August, he and Yoshino won the Summer Adventure Tag League Tournament for the second year in a row, and then a month later, on September 26, they captured the Open the Twin Gate Titles for a second time from Ryo Saito and Susumu Yokosuka. Their second reign was very short, for they lost the titles nine days later to YAMATO and Cyber Kong. However, Doi would go on to become the ace of the promotion by year's end: He won the King of Gate Tournament on December 19, and then nine days later he defeated Shingo Takagi to become the Open the Dream Gate Champion.

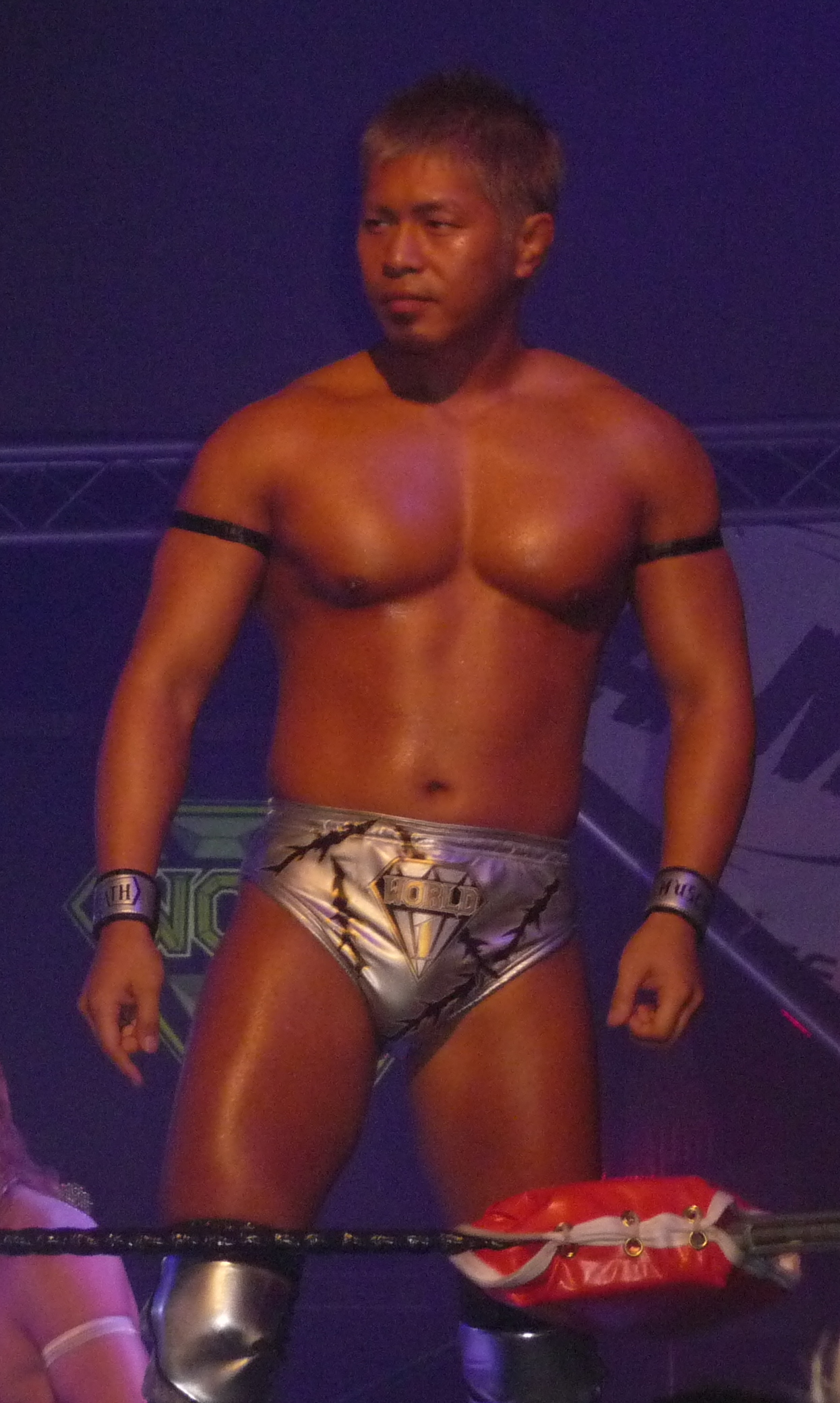
Doi in 2009

On May 5, he made a notable defense of the title against the former sumo champion-turned-wrestler Akebono. Despite the huge size difference, he was able to defeat Akebono and retain the title, after hitting him with five consecutive Bakatare Sliding Kicks. On July 19, he got his biggest victory ever when he defeated Open the Brave Gate Champion CIMA in a Title vs. Title Match, claiming the Brave Gate for a second time and really cementing his status as the unquestioned ace of the promotion. He vacated the Brave Gate immediately afterwards. On August 24, 2010, Doi and Masato Yoshino won their third Summer Adventure Tag League by defeating Genki Horiguchi and Ryo Saito in the finals. On October 13, 2010, Doi turned on Yoshino and joined the former Deep Drunkers and Takuya Sugawara to form a new heel stable. On November 23, 2010, Doi and Gamma defeated K-ness and Susumu Yokosuka to win the Open the Twin Gate Championship. At the final Dragon Gate show of 2010, Final Gate 2010 on December 26, Doi unsuccessfully challenged his former partner Masato Yoshino for the Open the Dream Gate Championship. On January 10, 2011, Doi and Gamma lost the Open the Twin Gate Championship to Don Fujii and Masaaki Mochizuki. On January 14, 2011, Team Doi aligned themselves with CIMA's Warriors stable, who turned heel in the process. On January 18 the new group was named Blood Warriors. On September 2, Doi, Kzy and Naoki Tanizaki defeated Gamma, Masato Yoshino and YAMATO to win the Dragon Gate Open the Triangle Gate Championship. They were stripped of the title on January 19, 2012, after Tanizaki was sidelined for six months with a shoulder injury. After being kicked out of Blood Warriors by new leader Akira Tozawa, Doi reunited with Masato Yoshino to form World-1 International. On May 6, Doi, Yoshino and Pac won the Open the Triangle Gate Championship. On September 12, 2013, Doi again turned on Yoshino and jumped to Mad Blankey, signalling the end of World-1 International. On August 5, 2014, Doi became the interim Open the Dream Gate Champion, when he defeated BxB Hulk in a four-on-one handicap match. He failed to become the official champion, losing to Hulk in a one-on-one match on August 17. On June 13, Doi and YAMATO would defeat Masato Yoshino and Sachihoko Boy to become Open the Twin Gate champions. On August 16, 2015, Mad Blankey was forced to disband after losing to Jimmyz in a five-on-five elimination tag team match, after being betrayed by K-ness. On September 23, Doi formed a new stable named VerserK with Cyber Kong, Kotoka, Mondai Ryu, Shingo Takagi and Yamato. Doi and Yamato would hold the Open the Twin Gate championships until losing the titles to T-Hawk and Big R Shimizu on March 6, 2016. They'd break Mochizuki and Fujii's most defences record with 9 defenses before losing the belts. On October 12, 2016, VerserK turned on Doi after disbanding Monster Express and kicked him out of the unit. Doi subsequently became a tweener, and once again began teaming with longtime partner Masato Yoshino. Doi unsuccessfully challenged YAMATO for the Open the Dream Gate Championship at Final Gate on December 25. Doi refused a handshake from YAMATO after the match, and was helped to the back by two men wearing pink hoods over their heads. On January 18, 2017, Doi saved Masato Yoshino, Kotoka, and Ben-K from an attack by VerserK. A match between the two sides was then set for February 2. On May 4, Naruki Doi reunited with Masato Yoshino and formed a new unit called MaxiMuM with Big R Shimizu, Ben-K, and Kotoka.

=== Foreign excursion ===
Doi became one half of the ROH World Tag Team Champions on March 3, 2007, with Shingo, beating The Briscoe Brothers in Liverpool, England. The two would lose the title back to the Briscoes at All Star Extravaganza III on March 30. In June 2008, he and Masato Yoshino joined Milano Collection A.T. and Puma to form Team Japan in that year's TNA World X Cup Tournament and together they had matches against members of the other teams, losing each match. At Victory Road, Doi competed in the Ultimate X match but came up short.

Doi has also appeared for the Hawaii-based Action Zone Wrestling, debuting with tag team partner Masato Yoshino on January 7, 2008 in a four-way tag team match. He later returned for singles action at AZW's third anniversary show Anniversary Annihilation on June 2, 2008 in a triple threat match against Akua and Sabaki.

== Championships and accomplishments ==
- All Japan Pro Wrestling
  - World Junior Heavyweight Championship (2 times)
- DDT Pro-Wrestling
  - DDT Universal Championship (1 time)
  - KO-D 6-Man Tag Team Championship (1 time) – with Toru Owashi and Kazuki Hirata
  - Ironman Heavymetalweight Championship (2 times)
- Dragon Gate
  - Dragon Gate I-J Heavyweight Tag Team Championship (1 time) – with Masato Yoshino
  - Open the Brave Gate Championship (2 times)
  - Open the Dream Gate Championship (2 times)
  - Open the Triangle Gate Championship (15 times) – with Cima and Shingo Takagi (1), Cima and Don Fujii (1), Gamma and Masato Yoshino (3), Gamma and Magnitude Kishiwada (1) Magnitude Kishiwada and Masato Yoshino (1), Pac and Naoki Tanizaki (1), Kzy and Naoki Tanizaki (1), Masato Yoshino and Pac (1), Masato Yoshino and Shachihoko Boy (1), Rich Swann and Shachihoko Boy (1), Cyber Kong and Kzy (1), Big R Shimizu and Ben-K (1), Masato Yoshino and Jason Lee (1), Kota Minoura and Minorita (1)
  - Open the Twin Gate Championship (8 times) – with Masato Yoshino (2), Gamma (1), Ricochet (1), Yamato (2), Takashi Yoshida (1) and Dragon Kid (1 time, current)
  - Interim Open the Dream Gate Championship (1 time)
  - King of Gate (2008)
  - Summer Adventure Tag League (2007, 2008, 2010) – with Masato Yoshino
  - First Triple Crown Champion
  - Third Grand Slam Champion
- Pro Wrestling Illustrated
  - Ranked No. 66 of the top 500 wrestlers in the PWI 500 in 2020
- Pro Wrestling Noah
  - GHC Junior Heavyweight Tag Team Championship (1 time) – with Masato Yoshino
- Pro Wrestling Zero1
  - International Lightweight Tag Team Championship (1 time, current) – with Takuya Sugawara
- Ring of Honor
  - ROH World Tag Team Championship (1 time) – with Shingo
- Toryumon Japan
  - UWA World Trios Championship (1 time) – with Dragon Kid and Kenichiro Arai
- Wrestling Observer Newsletter
  - Match of the Year (2006) with Masato Yoshino and Cima vs. Dragon Kid, Genki Horiguchi and Ryo Saito (ROH – Supercard of Honor – March 31)

Wager	Winner(s)	Loser(s)	Location	Date	Notes
Hair	BxB Hulk (Cyber Kong)	Naruki Doi (Kzy)	Aichi, Japan	May 5, 2014	This was a six-way steel cage match, also involving Cima (Dragon Kid), Jimmy Kanda (Jimmy Susumu), Masato Yoshino (Shachihoko Boy) and Mr. Kyu Kyu Naoki Tanizaki Toyonaka Dolphin (Genki Horiguchi H.A.Gee.Mee!!).
