= List of Ironman Heavymetalweight Champions (2000–2009) =

The Ironman Heavymetalweight Championship (Japanese: アイアンマンヘビーメタル級王座, Hepburn: Aianman Hebīmetaru-kyū Ōza) is a professional wrestling championship created and promoted by the Japanese promotion DDT Pro-Wrestling (DDT). Open to anyone, regardless of gender or DDT employment status, the championship is defended "24/7", as in any time, anywhere, as long as a referee is there to confirm the win. Because of this rule, not only is the championship winnable regardless of gender or number of individuals (in case of a common pinfall or submission), it is also available to "unconventional" champions such as animals or inanimate objects, with title changes regularly occurring outside of regular shows, often with videos posted on the promotion's social media accounts. It was created as a parody of the defunct WWE Hardcore Championship, which also had a "24/7 rule".

The championship was introduced on the June 29, 2000 TV taping, during which Poison Julie Sawada created the title and awarded it to himself, only to lose it in under three minutes after Mitsunobu Kikuzawa attacked him with the belt and successfully pinned him.

As of August 14, 2026, there have been 1,899 officially recognized reigns between 462 different human individuals, 8 teams and 66 inanimate objects and animals. The record for most reigns is held by Shinobu, who won it 216 times, including by trading the title back-and-forth with 215-time champion Yuko Miyamoto a total of 303 times on the same night. Danshoku Dino holds the record for longest combined reign with at least 534 days and counting (the exact date of when he won his tenth title is uncertain). Masa Takanashi's sixth reign is the longest singular reign at 333 days. Only 166 individuals have held the title for longer than a day. The title has occasionally been won by unusual means, such as an auction for the belt, rock paper scissors, and even a title change that occurred in a dream.

Non-wrestlers to have held the title include AV idol Nao Saejima, voice actors Sumire Uesaka and Tasuku Hatanaka, TV personality LiLiCo, J-pop idols Akari Suda, Kaori Matsumura, Rise Shiokawa, Aika Sawaguchi, Misaki Natsumi, Momomi Wagatsuma and Lingling, Tokyo Metropolitan Assemblyman Shinichiro Kawamatsu, a cat named Bunny, a monkey, a three-time champion ladder, Vince McMahon's Hollywood Walk of Fame star, a copy of The Young Bucks' autobiography Killing the Business, and the title belt itself.

== Title history ==
Key
No.	Overall reign number
Reign	Reign number for the specific champion
Days	Number of days held
N/A	Unknown information
(NLT)	Championship change took place "no later than" the date listed
<1	Reign lasted less than a day
+	Current reign is changing daily

No.	Champion	Championship change			Reign statistics		Notes	Ref.
No.	Champion	Date	Event	Location	Reign	Days	Notes	Ref.
Dramatic Dream Team (DDT)
1	Poison Sawada Black	June 29, 2000	DDT	Tokyo, Japan	1	<1	Created the title and recognized himself as the first champion, three minutes before losing it.	
2	Mitsunobu Kikuzawa	June 29, 2000	DDT	Tokyo, Japan	1	7		
3	Thunder	July 6, 2000	Non-Fix 7.6	Tokyo, Japan	1	<1	Referee.	
4	Poison Sawada Black	July 6, 2000	Non-Fix 7.6	Tokyo, Japan	2	6		
5	"Showa"	July 12, 2000	Michinoku Pro house show	Tokyo, Japan	1	14	AKA Phantom Funakoshi. This was a Michinoku Pro Wrestling event.	
6	Rojo del Sol	July 26, 2000	House show	Tokyo, Japan	1	8		
7	Naoshi Sano	August 3, 2000	Non-Fix 8.3	Tokyo, Japan	1	<1		
8	Rojo del Sol	August 3, 2000	Non-Fix 8.3	Tokyo, Japan	2	1		
9	Poison Sawada Black	August 4, 2000	House show	Tokyo, Japan	3	6		
—	Vacated	August 10, 2000	—	N/A	—	—	Vacated after Black was ordered by the Commissioner Yamamo to enter the DDT Tag Team League.	
10	Taiyo Rojo	August 24, 2000	Non-Fix 8.24	Tokyo, Japan	3	21	Defeated Pirate Wizard Viking to win the vacant title. Previously held the title as Rojo del Sol.	
11	Poison Sawada Black	September 14, 2000	House show	Tokyo, Japan	4	7	This was a three-way match also involving Mitsunobu Kikuzawa.	
12	Hebikage	September 21, 2000	Non-Fix 9.21	Tokyo, Japan	1	35	Poison Sawada Black allowed Hebikage to pin him.	
13	Chotaro Kamoi	October 26, 2000	Non-Fix 10.26	Tokyo, Japan	1	32		
14	Masakazu Nagase	November 27, 2000	Moe Moe DDT	Tokyo, Japan	1	<1	This was also for Nagase's Hollywood Wrestling Club Americas Middleweight Championship.	
15	Chotaro Kamoi	November 27, 2000	Moe Moe DDT	Tokyo, Japan	2	3		
16	Masakazu Nagase	November 30, 2000	Non-Fix 11.30	Tokyo, Japan	2	14	Took place during a tag team match, with "Showa" as Nagase's partner, and Mitsunobu Kikuzawa as Kamoi's. This was also for Nagase's Hollywood Wrestling Club Americas Middleweight Championship.	
17	Issei Fujisawa	December 14, 2000	Never Mind	Tokyo, Japan	1	<1	Took place during a battle royal.	
18	Toshiyuki Moriya	December 14, 2000	Never Mind	Tokyo, Japan	1	<1	IWA Kokusai wrestler. Took place during a battle royal.	
19	Masakazu Nagase	December 14, 2000	Never Mind	Tokyo, Japan	3	<1	Took place during a battle royal.	
20	Jigoku Soldier	December 14, 2000	Never Mind	Tokyo, Japan	1	<1	Took place during a battle royal.	
21	Masakazu Nagase	December 14, 2000	Never Mind	Tokyo, Japan	4	<1	Took place during a battle royal.	
22	Naoshi Sano	December 14, 2000	Never Mind	Tokyo, Japan	2	<1	Took place during a battle royal.	
23	Toshiyuki Moriya	December 14, 2000	Never Mind	Tokyo, Japan	2	<1	Took place during a battle royal.	
24	Shigeo Kato	December 14, 2000	Never Mind	Tokyo, Japan	1	<1	Took place during a battle royal.	
25	Fushicho Karasu	December 14, 2000	Never Mind	Tokyo, Japan	1	<1	Took place during a battle royal.	
26	Jigoku Soldier	December 14, 2000	Never Mind	Tokyo, Japan	2	<1	Took place during a battle royal.	
27	Misae-chan	December 14, 2000	Never Mind	Tokyo, Japan	1	<1	Took place during a battle royal; first woman to win the award.	
28	Issei Fujisawa	December 14, 2000	Never Mind	Tokyo, Japan	2	<1	Took place during a battle royal.	
29	Chotaro Kamoi	December 14, 2000	Never Mind	Tokyo, Japan	3	<1	Took place during a battle royal.	
30	Shigeo Kato	December 14, 2000	Never Mind	Tokyo, Japan	2	<1	Took place during a battle royal.	
31	Fushicho Karasu	December 14, 2000	Never Mind	Tokyo, Japan	2	<1	Took place during a battle royal.	
32	Misae-chan	December 14, 2000	Never Mind	Tokyo, Japan	2	<1	Took place during a battle royal.	
33	Fushicho Karasu	December 14, 2000	Never Mind	Tokyo, Japan	3	<1	Took place during a battle royal.	
34	Naoshi Sano	December 14, 2000	Never Mind	Tokyo, Japan	3	<1	Took place during a battle royal.	
35	Misae-chan	December 14, 2000	Never Mind	Tokyo, Japan	3	<1	Took place during a battle royal.	
36	Masakazu Nagase	December 14, 2000	Never Mind	Tokyo, Japan	5	<1	Took place during a battle royal.	
37	Chotaro Kamoi	December 14, 2000	Never Mind	Tokyo, Japan	4	<1	Took place during a battle royal.	
38	Naoshi Sano	December 14, 2000	Never Mind	Tokyo, Japan	4	<1	Took place during a battle royal.	
39	Fushicho Karasu	December 14, 2000	Never Mind	Tokyo, Japan	4	<1	Took place during a battle royal.	
40	Chotaro Kamoi	December 14, 2000	Never Mind	Tokyo, Japan	5	<1	Took place during a battle royal.	
41	Issei Fujisawa	December 14, 2000	Never Mind	Tokyo, Japan	3	<1	Took place during a battle royal.	
42	Toshiyuki Moriya	December 14, 2000	Never Mind	Tokyo, Japan	3	<1	Took place during a battle royal.	
43	Jigoku Soldier	December 14, 2000	Never Mind	Tokyo, Japan	3	<1	Took place during a battle royal.	
44	Toshiyuki Moriya	December 14, 2000	Never Mind	Tokyo, Japan	4	<1	Took place during a battle royal.	
45	Chotaro Kamoi	December 14, 2000	Never Mind	Tokyo, Japan	6	<1	Took place during a battle royal.	
46	Shark Tsuchiya	December 14, 2000	Never Mind	Tokyo, Japan	1	104		
47	Chotaro Kamoi	March 28, 2001	Judgement 5	Tokyo, Japan	7	32		
48	Hebider	April 29, 2001	DDT Golden Jack; Noon Event	Tokyo, Japan	2	<1	Previously held the title under the name Thunder.	
49	Chotaro Kamoi	April 29, 2001	DDT Golden Jack; Evening Event	Tokyo, Japan	8	19		
50	MMM	May 18, 2001	Max Bump	Tokyo, Japan	5	37	This was a four-way match also involving Blackjack Funk and Naoshi Sano. Previously held the title as Toshiyuki Moriya.	
51	Kazumasa Nihei	June 14, 2001	Non-Fix 6.14	Tokyo, Japan	1	15		
52	Chotaro Kamoi	June 29, 2001	No Reason, No Future	Tokyo, Japan	9	97	Nihei willingly gave the title to Kamoi.	
53	Asian Cougar	October 4, 2001	Non-Fix 10.4	Tokyo, Japan	1	69		
54	Hebikage	December 12, 2001	Never Mind 2001	Tokyo, Japan	2	<1	This was a 6-fold thread match also involving Fushicho Karasu, Hero!, Konicaman #2, and "Showa".	
55	Asian Cougar	December 12, 2001	Never Mind 2001	Tokyo, Japan	2	50		
56	Sanshiro Takagi	January 31, 2002	Non-Fix 1.31	Tokyo, Japan	1	<1		
57	Chocoball Mukai	January 31, 2002	Non-Fix 1.31	Tokyo, Japan	1	4		
58	Sanshiro Takagi	February 4, 2002	Cluster Battle 2002: That's Entertainment Wrestling Show 2	Tokyo, Japan	2	66	This was a Frontier Martial-Arts Wrestling event.	
59	Futoshi Miwa	April 11, 2002	Non-Fix 4.11	Tokyo, Japan	1	7		
60	Sanshiro Takagi	April 18, 2002	Non-Fix 4.18	Tokyo, Japan	3	<1	This was a 4-on-3 handicap match in which Takagi teamed with Takashi Sasaki and Thanomsak Toba against Super Uchuu Power, Kintaro Kanemura, Chocoball Mukai and Futoshi Miwa.	
61	Kintaro Kanemura	April 18, 2002	Non-Fix 4.18	Tokyo, Japan	1	7		
62	Sanshiro Takagi	April 25, 2002	Non-Fix 4.25	Tokyo, Japan	4	8	This was a tag team match in which Takagi teamed with Takashi Sasaki against Super Uchuu Power and Kintaro Kanemura.	
63	Futoshi Miwa	May 3, 2002	Turning Point	Tokyo, Japan	2	<1		
64	Issei Fujisawa	May 3, 2002	Turning Point	Tokyo, Japan	4	<1		
65	Bio-Monster DNA	May 3, 2002	Turning Point	Tokyo, Japan	1	<1	AKA Gosaku.	
66	Miyuki Maeda	May 3, 2002	Turning Point	Tokyo, Japan	1	<1		
67	Jakaibo Hebider	May 3, 2002	Turning Point	Tokyo, Japan	3	<1	Previously won the title as Hebider.	
68	Sanshiro Takagi	May 3, 2002	Turning Point	Tokyo, Japan	5	28		
69	Kintaro Kanemura	May 31, 2002	Max Bump 2002	Tokyo, Japan	2	6	This was also for Takagi's KO-D Openweight Championship.	
70	Chocoball Mukai	June 6, 2002	Non-Fix 6.6	Tokyo, Japan	2	7		
71	Gintaro Kanemura	June 13, 2002	Non-Fix 6.13	Tokyo, Japan	1	74	Shoichi Ichimiya parodying Kintaro Kanemura.	
72	Masashi Kakuta	August 26, 2002	The Ring 8.26	Chiba, Japan	1	<1	Sumo from Mecha-Mecha Iketeru!. First non-wrestler to win the title, and first title change to take place outside of Tokyo.	
73	Shoichi Ichimiya	August 26, 2002	The Ring 8.26	Chiba, Japan	2	12		
74	Kazuki Ohkubo	September 7, 2002	Deep: 6th Impact	Tokyo, Japan	1	63	MMA fighter. This took place during a Deep mixed martial arts event.	
75	Takashi Echigo	November 9, 2002	U-File 2	Tokyo, Japan	1	<1	MMA fighter. This took place during a U-File Camp mixed martial arts event.	
76	Shoichi Ichimiya	November 9, 2002	U-File 2	Tokyo, Japan	3	5	This took place during a U-File Camp mixed martial arts event.	
77	The Great Mampuku	November 14, 2002	Non-Fix 11.14	Tokyo, Japan	1	3	Character from a children TV show.	
78	AD Yamamoto	November 17, 2002	Tensai Terebi-kun Wide	Tokyo, Japan	1	<1	Character from a children TV show. This was on an episode of NHK's Tensai Terebi-kun Wide which aired on November 25, 2002.	
79	Shoichi Ichimiya	November 17, 2002	Tensai Terebi-kun Wide	Tokyo, Japan	4	34	This was on an episode of NHK's Tensai Terebi-kun Wide which aired on November 25, 2002.	
80	Kazumasa Nihei	December 21, 2002	Ironman Saves the Earth 24-Hour Marathon Match	Kanagawa, Japan	2	<1	Took place during a 24-hour marathon match.	
81	Shoichi Ichimiya	December 21, 2002	Ironman Saves the Earth 24-Hour Marathon Match	Kanagawa, Japan	5	14	Took place during a 24-hour marathon match.	
82	Mikami	January 4, 2003	The First Dream 2003	Tokyo, Japan	1	<1	This was also for Mikami's KO-D Openweight Championship.	
83	Sanshiro Takagi (Shoichi Ichimiya)	January 4, 2003	The First Dream 2003	Tokyo, Japan	6	<1	Took place during a royal rumble rules match. Shoichi Ichimiya impersonating Sanshiro Takagi. (Note: Under a name spelled 高偽三四郎 (Takagi Sanshirō), with the kanji 偽 (gi, "fake"), instead of 高木三四郎.)	
84	Head of the Student Council	January 4, 2003	The First Dream 2003	Tokyo, Japan	1	<1	President of a student association. Took place during a royal rumble rules match.	
85	Yoshihiro Sakai	January 4, 2003	The First Dream 2003	Tokyo, Japan	1	27	Took place during a royal rumble rules match.	
86	Ladder	January 31, 2003	Sheep 2003	Tokyo, Japan	1	<1	First inanimate object to win the title; the ladder fell on Sakai during a match against Mikami, with the referee counting the fall.	
87	Shoichi Ichimiya	January 31, 2003	Sheep 2003	Tokyo, Japan	7	28		
88	Yoshihiro Sakai	February 28, 2003	Break Through DDT	Tokyo, Japan	2	6		
89	"Showa" 80's	March 6, 2003	Non-Fix 3.6	Tokyo, Japan	1	<1	AKA Tomoya Adachi. IWA Kokusai wrestler.	
90	Yoshihiro Sakai	March 6, 2003	Non-Fix 3.6	Tokyo, Japan	3	38		
91	O.K. Revolution	April 13, 2003	Non-Fix 4.13	Tokyo, Japan	1	11		
92	Futoshi Miwa	April 24, 2003	Non-Fix 4.24	Tokyo, Japan	3	2		
93	Erika Yamakawa	April 26, 2003	Tensai Terebi-kun Max	Tokyo, Japan	1	<1	A fashion model, hosting NHK's Tensai Terebi-kun Max.	
94	Brian Walters	April 26, 2003	Tensai Terebi-kun Max	Tokyo, Japan	1	<1	A 13-year-old "Terebi Warrior".	
95	Futoshi Miwa	April 26, 2003	Tensai Terebi-kun Max	Tokyo, Japan	4	8		
96	O.K. Revolution	May 4, 2003	D-Day	Tokyo, Japan	2	42		
97	Hero!	June 15, 2003	Future Port 2003	Yokohama, Japan	1	39		
98	Shoichi Ichimiya	July 24, 2003	Non-Fix 7.24	Tokyo, Japan	8	10	This was a tag team match in which Ichimya (fighting as Gimanosuke Ueda, a parody of Umanosuke Ueda) teamed with Futoshi Miwa against Hero! and Kudo.	
99	Sanshiro Takagi	August 3, 2003	The Ring: Special Day	Tokyo, Japan	6	56	This was a Living Room Deathmatch.	
100	Ladder	September 28, 2003	Who's Gonna Top?	Tokyo, Japan	2	17	The ladder is considered to be the same as the previous ladder to win the title, therefore making it a two-time champion.	
—	Vacated	October 15, 2003	Non-Fix 10.15	Tokyo, Japan	—	—	The ladder "vacated" the title after being "encouraged" to by DDT president.	
101	Takashi Sasaki	October 15, 2003	Non-Fix 10.15	Tokyo, Japan	2	11	This was a 6th thread match also involving Sanshiro Takagi, Super Uchuu Power, Yoshihiro Sakai, O.K. Revolution, and Shuji Ishikawa. Sasaki previously held the title as the Head of the Student Council.	
102	Danshoku Dino	October 26, 2003	Dead or Alive 2023	Tokyo, Japan	1	28		
103	O.K. Revolution	November 23, 2003	Golden Killer 2003 in Nagoya	Nagoya, Japan	3	<1	Took place during a battle royal.	
104	KENT	November 23, 2003	Golden Killer 2003 in Nagoya	Nagoya, Japan	1	<1	"Freelancer". Took place during a battle royal.	
105	GUDO	November 23, 2003	Golden Killer 2003 in Nagoya	Nagoya, Japan	1	<1	AKA Kenichi Kawasaki. Took place during a battle royal.	
106	Seiya Morohashi	November 23, 2003	Golden Killer 2003 in Nagoya	Nagoya, Japan	1	<1	Took place during a battle royal.	
107	GUDO	November 23, 2003	Golden Killer 2003 in Nagoya	Nagoya, Japan	2	<1	Took place during a battle royal.	
108	Danshoku Dino	November 23, 2003	Golden Killer 2003 in Nagoya	Nagoya, Japan	2	<1	Took place during a battle royal.	
109	Kazumasa Nihei	November 23, 2003	Golden Killer 2003 in Nagoya	Nagoya, Japan	3	<1	Took place during a battle royal.	
110	KENT	November 23, 2003	Golden Killer 2003 in Nagoya	Nagoya, Japan	2	<1	Took place during a battle royal.	
111	Seiya Morohashi	November 23, 2003	Golden Killer 2003 in Nagoya	Nagoya, Japan	2	<1	Took place during a battle royal.	
112	O.K. Revolution	November 23, 2003	Golden Killer 2003 in Nagoya	Nagoya, Japan	4	<1	Took place during a battle royal.	
113	Futoshi Miwa	November 23, 2003	Golden Killer 2003 in Nagoya	Nagoya, Japan	5	<1	Took place during a battle royal.	
114	GUDO	November 23, 2003	Golden Killer 2003 in Nagoya	Nagoya, Japan	3	<1	Took place during a battle royal.	
115	Danshoku Dino	November 23, 2003	Golden Killer 2003 in Nagoya	Nagoya, Japan	3	<1	Took place during a battle royal.	
116	GUDO	November 23, 2003	Golden Killer 2003 in Nagoya	Nagoya, Japan	4	<1	Took place during a battle royal.	
117	Futoshi Miwa	November 23, 2003	Golden Killer 2003 in Nagoya	Nagoya, Japan	6	<1	Took place during a battle royal.	
118	O.K. Revolution	November 23, 2003	Golden Killer 2003 in Nagoya	Nagoya, Japan	5	<1	Took place during a battle royal.	
119	Danshoku Dino	November 23, 2003	Golden Killer 2003 in Nagoya	Nagoya, Japan	4	7	Took place during a battle royal.	
120	Issei Fujisawa	November 30, 2003	God Bless DDT 2003 in Osaka	Osaka, Japan	5	<1		
121	Riki Senshu	November 30, 2003	God Bless DDT 2003 in Osaka	Osaka, Japan	1	<1	Took place during a rumble rules battle royal.	
122	Para-Para Kuma-san	November 30, 2003	God Bless DDT 2003 in Osaka	Osaka, Japan	1	<1	Mascot suit wrestler. Took place during a rumble rules battle royal.	
123	Yusuke Inokuma	November 30, 2003	God Bless DDT 2003 in Osaka	Osaka, Japan	1	<1	Took place during a rumble rules battle royal.	
124	Macho☆Pump	November 30, 2003	God Bless DDT 2003 in Osaka	Osaka, Japan	1	<1	Took place during a rumble rules battle royal.	
125	Danshoku Dino	November 30, 2003	God Bless DDT 2003 in Osaka	Osaka, Japan	5	17	Took place during a rumble rules battle royal.	
126	O.K. Revolution	December 17, 2003	Non-Fix 12.17	Tokyo, Japan	6	12		
127	Danshoku Dino	December 29, 2003	Never Mind 2003	Tokyo, Japan	6	14	This was a tag team match in which Dino teamed with Shoichi Ichimiya against O.K. Revolution and Yoshihiro Sakai.	
128	Nikolai Gotchanski	January 12, 2004	Hatsuyume 2004	Tokyo, Japan	1	<1	A frog hand puppet resembling sportswriter Hirotsugu Suyama serving as assistant host on Fighting TV Samurai's Indie no Oshigoto. Gotchanski was represented in ring by an actual masked wrestler treated as if they were the same person.	
129	"Showa"	January 12, 2004	Hatsuyume 2004	Tokyo, Japan	2	<1	Pinned the Nikolai Gotchanski hand puppet backstage.	
130	Para-Para Kuma-san	January 12, 2004	Hatsuyume 2004	Tokyo, Japan	2	<1	Took place during a rumble rules battle royal.	
131	Futoshi Miwa	January 12, 2004	Hatsuyume 2004	Tokyo, Japan	7	<1	Took place during a rumble rules battle royal.	
132	Naomi Susan	January 12, 2004	Hatsuyume 2004	Tokyo, Japan	1	<1	Manager. Took place during a rumble rules battle royal.	
133	Danshoku Dino	January 12, 2004	Hatsuyume 2004	Tokyo, Japan	7	30	Took place during a rumble rules battle royal.	
134	Poison Sawada Julie	February 11, 2004	Future Port 2004	Yokohama, Japan	5	14	This was a no disqualification four-way match also involving Sanshiro Takagi and Shoichi Ichimiya, which was also for Ichimiya's KO-D Openweight Championship. Sawada previously won the title as Poison Sawada Black.	
135	Yusuke Inokuma	February 25, 2004	Non-Fix 2.25	Tokyo, Japan	2	<1	Poison Sawada Julie manipulated referee Miura into awarding the belt to Inokuma.	
136	Seiya Morohashi	February 25, 2004	Non-Fix 2.25	Tokyo, Japan	3	<1	This was a tag team match in which Morohashi teamed with Tomohiko Hashimoto against Poison Sawada Julie and Yusuke Inokuma.	
137	Yusuke Inokuma	February 25, 2004	Non-Fix 2.25	Tokyo, Japan	3	4		
138	Seiya Morohashi	February 29, 2004	Be Once in 4 Years	Osaka, Japan	4	<1		
139	Yusuke Inokuma	February 29, 2004	Be Once in 4 Years	Osaka, Japan	4	7		
140	Keisuke Masuda	March 7, 2004	SPWF 38th Dojo Match	Ichinomiya, Japan	1	<1	This was a tag team match held at a Super Professional Wrestling Federation event in which Masuda teamed with Danshoku Dino against Taku and Yusuke Inokuma.	
141	Yusuke Inokuma	March 7, 2004	SPWF 38th Dojo Match	Ichinomiya, Japan	5	7		
142	Mikami	March 14, 2004	N/A	Tokyo, Japan	2	<1		
143	Ted Tanabe	March 14, 2004	N/A	Tokyo, Japan	1	<1	Referee & ring announcer.	
144	Yusuke Inokuma	March 14, 2004	N/A	Tokyo, Japan	6	6		
145	Danshoku Dino	March 20, 2004	Judgement 8	Tokyo, Japan	8	71		
DDT Pro-Wrestling
146	Yusuke Inokuma	May 30, 2004	King of DDT 2004 2nd Day	Tokyo, Japan	7	<1		
147	Danshoku Dino	May 30, 2004	King of DDT 2004 2nd Day	Tokyo, Japan	9	N/A	The date of Dino's title loss is unknown; as such, the length of the reign is also unknown.	
148	Yusuke Inokuma	2004	N/A	N/A	8	N/A	The dates of Inokuma's title win and loss are unknown; as such, the length of the reign is also unknown.	
149	Danshoku Dino	June 27, 2004 (NLT)	N/A	N/A	10	(Note: The exact date of Dino's title win has not been confirmed, putting his title reign at between 4 days and 32 days.)	The exact date of Dino's title win has not been confirmed, but he was the 149th champion on June 27 at the latest.	
150	Kenshin	July 1, 2004	Audience 2004	Tokyo, Japan	1	13	Previously held the title as Issei Fujisawa.	
151	Shoichi Ichimiya	July 14, 2004	Non-Fix 7.14 in 1st Ring	Tokyo, Japan	9	17	This was a tag team matchin which Ichimiya teamed with Daichi Kakimoto against Kenshin and Kota Ibushi.	
152	Shimon Nagao	July 31, 2004	Boys Be Ambitious 2004	Tokyo, Japan	1	<1	3-year old picked from the audience. First civilian to be champion.	
153	Shoichi Ichimiya	July 31, 2004	Boys Be Ambitious 2004	Tokyo, Japan	10	61		
154	Gorgeous Matsuno	September 30, 2004	Who's Gonna Top? 2004	Tokyo, Japan	1	<1	Took place during a 10-minute battle royal.	
155	Koichiro Kimura	September 30, 2004	Who's Gonna Top? 2004	Tokyo, Japan	1	<1		
156	Riki Senshu	September 30, 2004	Who's Gonna Top? 2004	Tokyo, Japan	2	<1		
157	Gentaro	September 30, 2004	Who's Gonna Top? 2004	Tokyo, Japan	1	<1		
158	Maginum Tokyo	September 30, 2004	Who's Gonna Top? 2004	Tokyo, Japan	11	<1	Previously held the title under the name Shoichi Ichimiya.	
159	Gorgeous Matsuno	September 30, 2004	Who's Gonna Top? 2004	Tokyo, Japan	2	<1		
160	Koichiro Kimura	September 30, 2004	Who's Gonna Top? 2004	Tokyo, Japan	2	<1		
161	Muscle Sakai	September 30, 2004	Who's Gonna Top? 2004	Tokyo, Japan	4	<1	Was previously known as Yoshihiro Sakai.	
162	Gentaro	September 30, 2004	Who's Gonna Top? 2004	Tokyo, Japan	2	<1		
163	Maginum Tokyo	September 30, 2004	Who's Gonna Top? 2004	Tokyo, Japan	12	<1		
164	Takeshi Aida	September 30, 2004	Who's Gonna Top? 2004	Tokyo, Japan	1	20	First chairman of the Shinjuku Host Association.	
165	Shoichi Ichimiya	October 20, 2004	Non-Fix 10.20	Tokyo, Japan	13	28	Ichimiya pinned Takeshi Aida in one of his host clubs in a pre-recorded segment.	
166	Danshoku Dino	November 17, 2004	Non-Fix 11.17	Tokyo, Japan	11	2		
167	Shoichi Ichimiya	November 19, 2004	53 Stations of the Ironman	Ōiso, Japan	14	1	Ichimiya pinned Danshoku Dino on the beach of Ōiso. This was part of the 53 Stations of the Ironman match that aired on November 28, at God Bless DDT 2004.	
168	Taxi driver	November 20, 2004	53 Stations of the Ironman	Shizuoka, Japan	1	<1	An actual taxi driver. This was part of the 53 Stations of the Ironman match that aired on November 28, at God Bless DDT 2004.	
169	Danshoku Dino	November 20, 2004	53 Stations of the Ironman	Shizuoka, Japan	12	4	This was part of the 53 Stations of the Ironman match that aired on November 28, at God Bless DDT 2004.	
170	Shoichi Ichimiya	November 24, 2004	53 Stations of the Ironman	Chiryū, Japan	15	31	This was part of the 53 Stations of the Ironman match that aired on November 28, at God Bless DDT 2004.	
171	Yatchan	December 25, 2004	Never Mind 2004	Tokyo, Japan	1	62	A Japanese macaque; first animal to win the title. This was a Man vs. Monkey Mixed Martial Arts Rules Hair vs. Hair match.	
172	Riki Senshu	February 25, 2005	Don't Try This at Home 2005	Tokyo, Japan	3	30	This was a 5-entrant battle royal also involving Kenshin, Gorgeous Matsuno and Futoshi Miwa.	
173	Kenshin	March 27, 2005	DDT 8th Anniversary: Judgement 9	Tokyo, Japan	2	38		
174	Futoshi Miwa	May 4, 2005	Max Bump 2005	Tokyo, Japan	8	25	This was a three-way match also involving Lingerie Mutoh.	
175	Shoichi Ichimiya	May 29, 2005	King of DDT 2005	Tokyo, Japan	16	31	This was a six-man tag team match in which Ichimiya teamed with Sanshiro Takagi and Riki Senshu against the team of Seiya Morohashi, Thanomsak Toba and Futoshi Miwa.	
—	The Bloody	June 29, 2005	Audience 2005	Tokyo, Japan	—	<1	Ahead of a battle royal where he was supposed to defend the title, Shoichi Ichimiya was attacked and collectively pinned by all the participants. Since The Bloody's hand was at the bottom, she was declared the interim champion.	
176	Gorgeous Matsuno	June 29, 2005	Audience 2005	Tokyo, Japan	3	<1	Took place during a 10-minute battle royal.	
177	The Bloody	June 29, 2005	Audience 2005	Tokyo, Japan	1	<1	Took place during a 10-minute battle royal.	
178	Yuki Miyazaki	June 29, 2005	Audience 2005	Tokyo, Japan	1	<1	Took place during a 10-minute battle royal.	
179	MARU	June 29, 2005	Audience 2005	Tokyo, Japan	1	<1	Took place during a 10-minute battle royal.	
180	Toshie Uematsu	June 29, 2005	Audience 2005	Tokyo, Japan	1	<1	Took place during a 10-minute battle royal.	
181	Yumi Ohka	June 29, 2005	Audience 2005	Tokyo, Japan	1	<1	Took place during a 10-minute battle royal.	
182	Keiko Saito	June 29, 2005	Audience 2005	Tokyo, Japan	1	<1	Took place during a 10-minute battle royal.	
183	Cherry	June 29, 2005	Audience 2005	Tokyo, Japan	1	<1	Took place during a 10-minute battle royal.	
184	Yuki Miyazaki	June 29, 2005	Audience 2005	Tokyo, Japan	2	<1	Took place during a 10-minute battle royal.	
185	Gorgeous Matsuno	June 29, 2005	Audience 2005	Tokyo, Japan	4	<1	Took place during a 10-minute battle royal.	
186	Cherry	June 29, 2005	Audience 2005	Tokyo, Japan	2	<1	Took place during a 10-minute battle royal.	
187	Yuki Miyazaki	June 29, 2005	Audience 2005	Tokyo, Japan	3	4		
NEO Women's Wrestling (NEO)
188	Chiharu	July 3, 2005	Summer Stampede 05	Tokyo, Japan	1	<1	Pinned Miyazaki in front of dressing room.	
189	Yuki Miyazaki	July 3, 2005	Summer Stampede 05	Tokyo, Japan	4	<1	Pinned Chiharu in a dressing room.	
190	Chiharu	July 3, 2005	Summer Stampede 05	Tokyo, Japan	2	21	Pinned Miyazaki in a dressing room.	
191	Yuki Miyazaki	July 24, 2005	Midsummer Tag Tournament V Opening Day	Tokyo, Japan	5	6	This was a first round match in the Midsummer Tag Tournament V in which Miyazaki teamed with Tanny Mouse against Kyoko Kimura and Chiharu.	
192	Yuka Nakamura	July 30, 2005	—	Tokyo, Japan	1	<1	Pins Miyazaki at a bus stop.	
193	Tanny Mouse	July 30, 2005	—	Niigata, Japan	1	<1	Pins Nakamura in a women's room at a service area of a toll way.	
194	A chef	July 30, 2005	—	Niigata, Japan	1	<1	The head chef of the Yakeyama Springs. Won the title by pinning Mouse in a banquet room.	
195	Haruka Matsuo	July 30, 2005	—	Niigata, Japan	1	<1	Defeats the chef with a sleeper on a stairway at Yakeyama Springs Inn.	
196	Yuki Miyazaki	July 30, 2005	—	Niigata, Japan	6	1	Pins Matsuo in Matsuo's guest room at Yakeyama Springs Inn as Matsuo tries to sleep.	
197	Etsuko Mita	July 31, 2005	—	Tokyo, Japan	1	7	Pins Miyazaki in front of the bus after they get out from it.	
198	Tanny Mouse	August 7, 2005	Midsummer Tag Tournament V	Tokyo, Japan	2	<1		
199	Kaori Yoneyama	August 7, 2005	Midsummer Tag Tournament V	Tokyo, Japan	1	<1		
—	Vacated	August 7, 2005	Midsummer Tag Tournament V	Tokyo, Japan	—	—	Yoneyama immediately vacated the title because the number 199 was "not a good number to call".	
200	Tanny Mouse	August 21, 2005	Midsummer Tag Tournament V Finals	Tokyo, Japan	3	<1	Last eliminated Chiharu in a 10-people battle royal to win the vacant title.	
201	Hana Kimura	August 21, 2005	Midsummer Tag Tournament V Finals	Tokyo, Japan	1	<1	Daughter of wrestler Kyoko Kimura and 8 years old at the time, later became a professional wrestler herself.	
202	Kyoko Kimura	August 21, 2005	Midsummer Tag Tournament V Finals	Tokyo, Japan	1	<1		
203	Yuka Nakamura	August 21, 2005	Midsummer Tag Tournament V Finals	Tokyo, Japan	2	48		
204	DJ Nira	October 8, 2005	Main Street Round 2	Tokyo, Japan	1	<1	This was a three-way match also involving Tanny Mouse.	
205	Yuki Miyazaki	October 8, 2005	Main Street Round 2	Tokyo, Japan	7	28		
206	Yuka Nakamura	November 5, 2005	Main Street Round 5	Tokyo, Japan	3	22		
207	Tanny Mouse	November 27, 2005	Main Street Final Day	Tokyo, Japan	4	<1		
208	Bullfight Sora	November 27, 2005	Main Street Final Day	Tokyo, Japan	1	14		
209	DJ Nira	December 11, 2005	Stand Out	Tokyo, Japan	2	<1		
210	Yuki Miyazaki	December 11, 2005	Stand Out	Tokyo, Japan	8	14		
211	Kyoko Inoue	December 25, 2005	Merry Xmas For You 05	Tokyo, Japan	1	<1	This was a tag team match in which Inoue teamed with Etsuko Mita against Yoshiko Tamura and Yuki Miyazaki.	
212	Bullfight Sora	December 25, 2005	Merry Xmas For You 05	Tokyo, Japan	2	<1		
213	Kyoko Inoue	December 25, 2005	Merry Xmas For You 05	Tokyo, Japan	2	<1		
214	Toshie Uematsu	December 25, 2005	Merry Xmas For You 05	Tokyo, Japan	2	<1	Took place during a 16-person battle royal.	
215	Fang Suzuki	December 25, 2005	Merry Xmas For You 05	Tokyo, Japan	1	<1	Took place during a 16-person battle royal.	
216	Chiharu	December 25, 2005	Merry Xmas For You 05	Tokyo, Japan	3	<1	Took place during a 16-person battle royal.	
217	Kitty-chan	December 25, 2005	Merry Xmas For You 05	Tokyo, Japan	1	<1	A Hello Kitty doll. Took place during a 16-person battle royal.	
218	Mah-kun	December 25, 2005	Merry Xmas For You 05	Tokyo, Japan	1	<1	A stuffed doll. Took place during a 16-person battle royal.	
219	Bullfight Sora	December 25, 2005	Merry Xmas For You 05	Tokyo, Japan	3	<1	Took place during a 16-person battle royal.	
220	Yuki Miyazaki	December 25, 2005	Merry Xmas For You 05	Tokyo, Japan	9	21	Took place during a 16-person battle royal.	
221	Misae Genki	January 15, 2006	1st NEO Dojo Regular Match Special	Yokohama, Japan	4	20	Previously won the title as Misae-chan. Took place during a gauntlet match.	
222	Aika	February 4, 2006	Reborn to Win Round 2	Tokyo, Japan	1	49		
223	Mai Ichii	March 25, 2006	Wrestling Girls' Ambitions Vol. 2: Strongest Girl Battle	Tokyo, Japan	1	<1	This was a Gatokunyan event.	
224	Emi Sakura	March 25, 2006	Wrestling Girls' Ambitions Vol. 2: Strongest Girl Battle	Tokyo, Japan	1	<1	This was a tag team match in which Sakura teamed with Natsuki☆Head against Mai Ichii and Moeka Haruhi. This was a Gatokunyan event.	
225	Aika	March 25, 2006	Wrestling Girls' Ambitions Vol. 2: Strongest Girl Battle	Tokyo, Japan	2	35	This was a Gatokunyan event.	
226	Hikari	April 29, 2006	Wrestling Girls' Ambitions Vol. 3: Respective Ambitions	Tokyo, Japan	1	6	This was a Gatokunyan event.	
227	Misae Genki	May 5, 2006	May History	Tokyo, Japan	5	<1		
228	Tetsuhiro Kuroda	May 5, 2006	May History	Tokyo, Japan	1	<1		
229	Toshie Uematsu's father	May 5, 2006	May History	Tokyo, Japan	1	<1		
230	Tetsuya Koda	May 5, 2006	May History	Tokyo, Japan	1	<1	President of NEO Women's Wrestling.	
231	Emi Sakura	May 5, 2006	May History	Tokyo, Japan	2	<1		
232	Hinata	May 5, 2006	May History	Tokyo, Japan	1	<1		
233	Kinoko	May 5, 2006	May History	Tokyo, Japan	1	<1		
234	Miki Ishii	May 5, 2006	May History	Tokyo, Japan	1	<1		
235	Hikari	May 5, 2006	May History	Tokyo, Japan	2	31		
236	Natsuki☆Head	June 5, 2006	House show	Tokyo, Japan	1	9		
DDT Pro-Wrestling
237	Mecha Mummy	June 14, 2006	Non-Fix 6.14	Tokyo, Japan	1	4		
238	Mecha Stanley	June 18, 2006	Super Spicy Series	Tokyo, Japan	5	7	Previously won the title as Naoshi Sano. This was a tag team match held at a Union Pro Wrestling event in which Sano, wrestling as Mecha Stanley, teamed with Mecha Goro against Mecha Mummy and The Mummy .	
239	Poco Takanashi	June 25, 2006	King of DDT 2006	Tokyo, Japan	1	<1	Won the title as Poco Takanashi, then put Mecha Stanley's helmet on and became Masahiro Mechanashi.	
240	Natsuki☆Head	June 25, 2006	King of DDT 2006	Tokyo, Japan	2	<1	Took place during a battle royal.	
241	Mikami	June 25, 2006	King of DDT 2006	Tokyo, Japan	3	<1	Took place during a battle royal.	
242	Daichi Kakimoto	June 25, 2006	King of DDT 2006	Tokyo, Japan	1	<1	Took place during a battle royal.	
243	Mango Fukuda	June 25, 2006	King of DDT 2006	Tokyo, Japan	1	<1	Took place during a battle royal.	
244	Sanshiro Takagi	June 25, 2006	King of DDT 2006	Tokyo, Japan	7	<1	Took place during a battle royal.	
245	Mikami	June 25, 2006	King of DDT 2006	Tokyo, Japan	4	<1	Took place during a battle royal.	
246	Masahiro Mechanashi	June 25, 2006	King of DDT 2006	Tokyo, Japan	2	<1	Took place during a battle royal.	
247	Mecha Mummy	June 25, 2006	King of DDT 2006	Tokyo, Japan	2	5	Took place during a battle royal.	
248	The Mac	June 30, 2006	Go Go West Tour 2006 in Osaka	Osaka, Japan	9	<1	Took place during a battle royal. Previously held the title under the name Futoshi Miwa.	
249	Seiya Morohashi	June 30, 2006	Go Go West Tour 2006 in Osaka	Osaka, Japan	5	<1	Took place during a battle royal.	
250	Yukinori Matsui	June 30, 2006	Go Go West Tour 2006 in Osaka	Osaka, Japan	1	<1	DDT referee. Took place during a battle royal.	
251	Bull Armor TAKUYA	June 30, 2006	Go Go West Tour 2006 in Osaka	Osaka, Japan	1	<1	AKA Dynamite Nozaki. Took place during a battle royal.	
252	Mecha Mummy	June 30, 2006	Go Go West Tour 2006 in Osaka	Osaka, Japan	3	2	Took place during a battle royal.	
253	Francisco Togo	July 2, 2006	Go Go West Tour 2006 in Shimane	Matsue, Japan	1	<1	Took place during a battle royal.	
254	Antonio Honda	July 2, 2006	Go Go West Tour 2006 in Shimane	Matsue, Japan	1	<1	Took place during a battle royal.	
255	Mecha Mummy	July 2, 2006	Go Go West Tour 2006 in Shimane	Matsue, Japan	4	7	Took place during a battle royal.	
256	The Mac	July 9, 2006	Dramatic Dragons 2006	Nagoya, Japan	10	<1	Took place during a battle royal.	
257	Poco Takanashi	July 9, 2006	Dramatic Dragons 2006	Nagoya, Japan	3	<1	Took place during a battle royal. Previously won the title as Masahiro Mechanashi.	
258	296	July 9, 2006	Dramatic Dragons 2006	Nagoya, Japan	1	<1	Took place during a battle royal.	
259	Thanomsak Toba	July 9, 2006	Dramatic Dragons 2006	Nagoya, Japan	1	<1	Took place during a battle royal.	
260	Mori Bernard	July 9, 2006	Dramatic Dragons 2006	Nagoya, Japan	1	<1	Took place during a battle royal.	
261	Mecha Mummy	July 9, 2006	Dramatic Dragons 2006	Nagoya, Japan	5	<1	Took place during a battle royal.	
262	Thanomsak Toba	July 9, 2006	Dramatic Dragons 2006	Nagoya, Japan	2	14	Took place during a battle royal.	
263	The Mac	July 23, 2006	Summer Vacation 2006	Tokyo, Japan	11	<1	Took place during a battle royal.	
264	Daichi Kakimoto	July 23, 2006	Summer Vacation 2006	Tokyo, Japan	2	<1	Took place during a battle royal.	
265	Bear Fukuda	July 23, 2006	Summer Vacation 2006	Tokyo, Japan	2	<1	Took place during a battle royal. Previously known as Mango Fukuda.	
266	Seiya Morohashi	July 23, 2006	Summer Vacation 2006	Tokyo, Japan	6	<1	Took place during a battle royal.	
267	Poco Takanashi	July 23, 2006	Summer Vacation 2006	Tokyo, Japan	4	<1	Took place during a battle royal.	
268	Mecha Matsuno	July 23, 2006	Summer Vacation 2006	Tokyo, Japan	5	<1		
269	Mecha Mummy	July 23, 2006	Burn! Fire Series	Tokyo, Japan	6	28	This was a three-way match held at a Union Pro Wrestling event, also involving Koryuki.	
270	Antonio Honda	August 20, 2006	Wrestle Expo 2006: Summer Night Explosion	Tokyo, Japan	2	<1	Took place during a battle royal held at an interpromotional independent event.	
271	Mad Man Pondo	August 20, 2006	Wrestle Expo 2006: Summer Night Explosion	Tokyo, Japan	1	<1	Took place during a battle royal held at an interpromotional independent event.	
272	J.C. Bailey	August 20, 2006	Wrestle Expo 2006: Summer Night Explosion	Tokyo, Japan	1	<1	Took place during a battle royal held at an interpromotional independent event.	
273	2 Tuff Tony	August 20, 2006	Wrestle Expo 2006: Summer Night Explosion	Tokyo, Japan	1	<1	Took place during a battle royal held at an interpromotional independent event.	
274	Super Stanley	August 20, 2006	Wrestle Expo 2006: Summer Night Explosion	Tokyo, Japan	1	<1	Took place during a battle royal held at an interpromotional independent event.	
275	Guts Ishijima	August 20, 2006	Wrestle Expo 2006: Summer Night Explosion	Tokyo, Japan	1	<1	Took place during a battle royal held at an interpromotional independent event.	
276	Choun Shiryu	August 20, 2006	Wrestle Expo 2006: Summer Night Explosion	Tokyo, Japan	1	<1	Took place during a battle royal held at an interpromotional independent event.	
277	Poison Sawada Julie	August 20, 2006	Wrestle Expo 2006: Summer Night Explosion	Tokyo, Japan	6	<1	Took place during a battle royal held at an interpromotional independent event.	
278	Mecha Mummy	August 20, 2006	Wrestle Expo 2006: Summer Night Explosion	Tokyo, Japan	7	<1	Took place during a battle royal held at an interpromotional independent event.	
279	The Crazy SKB	August 20, 2006	Wrestle Expo 2006: Summer Night Explosion	Tokyo, Japan	1	70	Frontman of Qp-Crazy & co-founder of Wrestling of Darkness 666. Took place during a battle royal held at an interpromotional independent event.	
Wrestling of Darkness 666 (666)
280	Ikeda Seijin	October 29, 2006	666 Vol. 15: Halloween Show	Tokyo, Japan	1	<1	Took place during a battle royal.	
281	A Gaora cameraman	October 29, 2006	666 Vol. 15: Halloween Show	Tokyo, Japan	1	<1	Took place during a battle royal.	
282	Poa Poa	October 29, 2006	666 Vol. 15: Halloween Show	Tokyo, Japan	1	<1	Took place during a battle royal.	
283	Dodeka Kuma-san	October 29, 2006	666 Vol. 15: Halloween Show	Tokyo, Japan	1	<1	Took place during a battle royal.	
284	World's PK	October 29, 2006	666 Vol. 15: Halloween Show	Tokyo, Japan	1	<1	Took place during a battle royal.	
285	Jushin Satsugai Liger	October 29, 2006	666 Vol. 15: Halloween Show	Tokyo, Japan	6	<1	Took place during a battle royal.	
286	Lingerie Mutoh	October 29, 2006	666 Vol. 15: Halloween Show	Tokyo, Japan	1	<1	Took place during a battle royal.	
287	Naoshi Sano	October 29, 2006	666 Vol. 15: Halloween Show	Tokyo, Japan	6	<1	Took place during a battle royal.	
288	Jushin Satsugai Liger	October 29, 2006	666 Vol. 15: Halloween Show	Tokyo, Japan	2	<1	Took place during a battle royal.	
289	The Nasty Black Panther	October 29, 2006	666 Vol. 15: Halloween Show	Tokyo, Japan	1	<1	Took place during a battle royal.	
290	Dokaben	October 29, 2006	666 Vol. 15: Halloween Show	Tokyo, Japan	1	<1	Triple Six referee. Took place during a battle royal.	
291	Naoshi Sano	October 29, 2006	666 Vol. 15: Halloween Show	Tokyo, Japan	7	<1	Took place during a battle royal.	
292	Dark Shaman Morinosu	October 29, 2006	666 Vol. 15: Halloween Show	Tokyo, Japan	1	<1		
293	Ram Kaicho	October 29, 2006	666 Vol. 15: Halloween Show	Tokyo, Japan	1	<1		
—	Vacated	October 29, 2006	—	N/A	—	—	Ramu Kaicho, a member of the 666 promotion, vacated the title in order to have the 666th champion come from 666.	
294	Shinobu	2006	House show	Japan	1	N/A	Defeated Yuko Miyamoto to win the vacant title. The dates of Miyamoto's title win and loss are unknown; as such, the length of the reign is also unknown.	
295	Yuko Miyamoto	2006	House show	Japan	1	N/A	The dates of Miyamoto's title win and loss are unknown; as such, the length of the reign is also unknown.	
296–597	Shinobu/Yuko Miyamoto	2006	House show	Japan	—	N/A	During a live show, Shinobu and Miyamoto traded the championship with each other 303 times in order to artificially inflate the reign number. The date of the event is unknown. Those title changes are not listed to reduce the size of the article.	
598	Yuko Miyamoto	2006	House show	Japan	152	N/A	303rd and final title change between Shinobu and Miyamoto. The dates of Miyamoto's title win and loss are unknown; as such, the length of the reign is also unknown.	
599	Shinobu	2006	House show	Japan	152	N/A	The dates of Shinobu's title win and loss are unknown; as such, the length of the reign is also unknown.	
600	Sayoko Mita	2006	House show	Japan	1	N/A	A female newscaster of a cable station. The date of Mita's title win is unknown; as such, the length of the reign is also unknown.	
601	Shinobu	December 16, 2006	House show	Tokyo, Japan	153	N/A	The date of Shinobu's title loss is unknown; as such, the length of the reign is also unknown.	
602–660	Shinobu/Yuko Miyamoto	December 2006	House show	Japan	—	N/A	During a live show, Shinobu and Miyamoto traded the title 60 times in short order via rock–paper–scissors. The date of the event is unknown.	
661	Yuko Miyamoto	December 23, 2006	666 Vol. 16: 3rd Anniversary Show	Tokyo, Japan	214	<1		
662	Shinobu	December 23, 2006	666 Vol. 16: 3rd Anniversary Show	Tokyo, Japan	215	<1		
663	Yuko Miyamoto	December 23, 2006	666 Vol. 16: 3rd Anniversary Show	Tokyo, Japan	215	<1		
664	Shinobu	December 23, 2006	666 Vol. 16: 3rd Anniversary Show	Tokyo, Japan	216	<1		
665	Mecha Mummy Gold	December 23, 2006	666 Vol. 16: 3rd Anniversary Show	Tokyo, Japan	1	<1		
666	The Crazy SKB	December 23, 2006	666 Vol. 16: 3rd Anniversary Show	Tokyo, Japan	2	29		
667	Naoshi Sano	January 21, 2007	Special Edition 666 Vol. 3: 3rd Obsession Anniversary Party	Tokyo, Japan	9	<1	The Crazy SKB put the title on an auction, which was won by Sano.	
668	Senpai	January 21, 2007	Special Edition 666 Vol. 3: 3rd Obsession Anniversary Party	Tokyo, Japan	1	49	Took place during a battle royal.	
DDT Pro-Wrestling
669	Naoshi Sano	March 11, 2007	Judgement 10th Anniversary Special	Tokyo, Japan	10	<1		
670	Yuki Miyazaki	March 11, 2007	Judgement 10th Anniversary Special	Tokyo, Japan	10	<1	Took place during a six-person rumble rules battle royal.	
671	Naoshi Sano	March 11, 2007	Judgement 10th Anniversary Special	Tokyo, Japan	11	<1	Took place during a six-person rumble rules battle royal.	
672	Yuki Miyazaki	March 11, 2007	Judgement 10th Anniversary Special	Tokyo, Japan	11	<1	Took place during a six-person rumble rules battle royal.	
673	Naoshi Sano	March 11, 2007	Judgement 10th Anniversary Special	Tokyo, Japan	12	<1	Took place during a six-person rumble rules battle royal.	
674	Yuki Miyazaki	March 11, 2007	Judgement 10th Anniversary Special	Tokyo, Japan	12	<1	Took place during a six-person rumble rules battle royal.	
675	Naoshi Sano	March 11, 2007	Judgement 10th Anniversary Special	Tokyo, Japan	13	<1	Took place during a six-person rumble rules battle royal.	
676	Fushicho Karasu	March 11, 2007	Judgement 10th Anniversary Special	Tokyo, Japan	5	<1	Took place during a six-person rumble rules battle royal.	
677	Yuki Miyazaki	March 11, 2007	Judgement 10th Anniversary Special	Tokyo, Japan	13	<1	Took place during a six-person rumble rules battle royal.	
678	Taneichi Kacho	March 11, 2007	Judgement 10th Anniversary Special	Tokyo, Japan	1	<1	Took place during a six-person rumble rules battle royal.	
679	Naoshi Sano	March 11, 2007	Judgement 10th Anniversary Special	Tokyo, Japan	14	<1	Took place during a six-person rumble rules battle royal.	
680	Kikutaro	March 11, 2007	Judgement 10th Anniversary Special	Tokyo, Japan	2	<1	Took place during a six-person rumble rules battle royal.	
681	Yuki Miyazaki	March 11, 2007	Judgement 10th Anniversary Special	Tokyo, Japan	14	<1	Took place during a six-person rumble rules battle royal.	
682	Kikutaro	March 11, 2007	Judgement 10th Anniversary Special	Tokyo, Japan	3	<1	Took place during a six-person rumble rules battle royal.	
683	Naomi Susan	March 11, 2007	Judgement 10th Anniversary Special	Tokyo, Japan	2	<1	Took place during a six-person rumble rules battle royal.	
684	Kikutaro	March 11, 2007	Judgement 10th Anniversary Special	Tokyo, Japan	4	<1	Took place during a six-person rumble rules battle royal.	
685	Taneichi Kacho	March 11, 2007	Judgement 10th Anniversary Special	Tokyo, Japan	2	<1	Took place during a six-person rumble rules battle royal.	
686	Naoshi Sano	March 11, 2007	Judgement 10th Anniversary Special	Tokyo, Japan	15	<1	Took place during a six-person rumble rules battle royal.	
687	Fushicho Karasu	March 11, 2007	Judgement 10th Anniversary Special	Tokyo, Japan	6	<1	Took place during a six-person rumble rules battle royal.	
688	Yuki Miyazaki	March 11, 2007	Judgement 10th Anniversary Special	Tokyo, Japan	15	<1	Took place during a six-person rumble rules battle royal.	
689	Exciting Yoshida	March 11, 2007	Judgement 10th Anniversary Special	Tokyo, Japan	1	<1	Took place during a six-person rumble rules battle royal.	
690	Kikutaro	March 11, 2007	Judgement 10th Anniversary Special	Tokyo, Japan	5	<1	Took place during a six-person rumble rules battle royal.	
691	Taneichi Kacho	March 11, 2007	Judgement 10th Anniversary Special	Tokyo, Japan	3	<1	Took place during a six-person rumble rules battle royal.	
692	Exciting Yoshida	March 11, 2007	Judgement 10th Anniversary Special	Tokyo, Japan	2	<1	Took place during a six-person rumble rules battle royal.	
693	Ladder	March 11, 2007	Judgement 10th Anniversary Special	Tokyo, Japan	3	21	The ladder is considered to be the same as the previous ladders to win the title, thus making it a three-time champion.	
694	Cocolo	April 1, 2007	Aprilfool 2007	Tokyo, Japan	1	45	Referee Megumi Grace Asano's miniature dachshund dog.	
695	Megumi Grace Asano	May 16, 2007	Non-Fix 5.16	Tokyo, Japan	1	7	A referee.	
696	Yusuke Inokuma	May 23, 2007	Non-Fix 5.23	Tokyo, Japan	9	<1		
697	Gorgeous Matsuno	May 23, 2007	Non-Fix 5.23	Tokyo, Japan	5	3	Won the title by pinning Inokuma in a 3-on-1 handicap match, in which Danshoku Dino and Muscle Sakai were Inokuma's partners.	
698	Kenshin	May 26, 2007	Makehen 6	Gifu, Japan	3	<1	This was a Makehen event.	
699	Antonio Koinoki	May 26, 2007	Makehen 6	Gifu, Japan	1	<1	This was a Makehen event.	
700	Gorgeous Matsuno	May 26, 2007	Makehen 6	Gifu, Japan	6	8	This was a Makehen event.	
701	A baseball bat	June 3, 2007	King of DDT 2007	Tokyo, Japan	1	<1	Took place during a battle royal.	
702	Kazuhiko Ogasawara	June 3, 2007	King of DDT 2007	Tokyo, Japan	1	<1	Took place during a battle royal.	
703	Hoshitango	June 3, 2007	King of DDT 2007	Tokyo, Japan	1	<1	Took place during a battle royal.	
704	Naoshi Sano	June 3, 2007	King of DDT 2007	Tokyo, Japan	16	<1	Took place during a battle royal.	
705	Naoki Tanizaki	June 3, 2007	King of DDT 2007	Tokyo, Japan	1	<1	Took place during a battle royal.	
706	Yusuke Inokuma	June 3, 2007	King of DDT 2007	Tokyo, Japan	10	<1	Took place during a battle royal.	
707	Kazuhiko Ogasawara	June 3, 2007	King of DDT 2007	Tokyo, Japan	2	63	Took place during a battle royal.	
708	Naoshi Sano	August 5, 2007	Dramatic Style 2007	Tokyo, Japan	17	<1	Took place during a battle royal.	
709	Hoshitango	August 5, 2007	Dramatic Style 2007	Tokyo, Japan	2	<1	Took place during a battle royal.	
710	Kazuhiko Ogasawara	August 5, 2007	Dramatic Style 2007	Tokyo, Japan	3	6		
711	Sanshiro Takagi (Shoichi Ichimiya)	August 11, 2007	Fighting Beer Garden: 8.11 Union Produce	Tokyo, Japan	17	28	Shoichi Ichimiya impersonating Sanshiro Takagi. This was a Union Pro Wrestling branded event.	
712	Leonard Takatsu	September 8, 2007	Itabashi Guts Festival	Tokyo, Japan	1	<1	This was a Guts World Pro-Wrestling event.	
713	Reiji Azuma	September 8, 2007	Itabashi Guts Festival	Tokyo, Japan	1	<1	An elementary school boy. This was a Guts World Pro-Wrestling event.	
714	Shoichi Ichimiya	September 8, 2007	Itabashi Guts Festival	Tokyo, Japan	18	9	This was a Guts World Pro-Wrestling event.	
715	Airi Ueda, Shiori Takahashi, and Minami Tanabe	September 17, 2007	House show	Tokyo, Japan	1	<1	Three elementary school girls, who pinned Ichimiya together to become co-champions. First time the title was held by several people at once.	
716	Shoichi Ichimiya	September 17, 2007	House show	Tokyo, Japan	19	9	Later defended the title as Tarzan Gito, a parody of Tarzan Goto.	
717	Ken Kataya	September 26, 2007	Union Quest 2007	Tokyo, Japan	1	<1	Took place during a battle royal.	
718	726	September 26, 2007	Union Quest 2007	Tokyo, Japan	1	<1	Took place during a battle royal.	
719	Kazuhiko Ogasawara	September 26, 2007	Union Quest 2007	Tokyo, Japan	4	<1	Took place during a battle royal.	
720	Tarzan Gito	September 26, 2007	Union Quest 2007	Tokyo, Japan	20	<1	Previously won the title as Shoichi Ichimiya and Sanshiro Takagi. Took place during a battle royal.	
721	Ken Kataya	September 26, 2007	Union Quest 2007	Tokyo, Japan	2	<1	Took place during a battle royal.	
722	726	September 26, 2007	Union Quest 2007	Tokyo, Japan	2	<1	Took place during a battle royal.	
723	Guts Ishijima	September 26, 2007	Union Quest 2007	Tokyo, Japan	2	<1	Took place during a battle royal.	
724	Kazuhiko Ogasawara	September 26, 2007	Union Quest 2007	Tokyo, Japan	5	11	Took place during a battle royal.	
725	Nao Saejima	October 7, 2007	Tenka Sanbun no Kei	Fukuoka, Japan	1	<1	An AV idol.	
726	KAWANO	October 7, 2007	Tenka Sanbun no Kei	Fukuoka, Japan	1	<1		
727	Takashi Niwada	October 7, 2007	Tenka Sanbun no Kei	Fukuoka, Japan	1	<1		
728	Karate Mummy	October 7, 2007	Tenka Sanbun no Kei	Fukuoka, Japan	1	<1	AKA Super Crafter U.	
729	Akihiro	October 7, 2007	Tenka Sanbun no Kei	Fukuoka, Japan	1	<1	A sex doll.	
730	Nao Saejima	October 7, 2007	Tenka Sanbun no Kei	Fukuoka, Japan	2	<1		
731	Kazuhiko Ogasawara	October 7, 2007	Tenka Sanbun no Kei	Fukuoka, Japan	6	74		
732	Naoshi Sano	December 20, 2007	Union Christmas 2007	Tokyo, Japan	18	10	This was a three-way match also involving Keisuke Masuda.	
733	Ken Ohka	December 30, 2007	Never Mind 2007	Tokyo, Japan	7	<1	Previously won the title as O.K. Revolution.	
734	Sanshiro Takagi	December 30, 2007	Never Mind 2007	Tokyo, Japan	8	1		
735	Kota Ibushi	December 31, 2007	Pro-Wrestling Summit in Korakuen	Tokyo, Japan	1	6	Took place during a six-man tag team match in which Ibushi, teaming with Madoka and B×B Hulk, pinned Takagi who was teaming with Abdullah Kobayashi and Don Fujii.	
736	Thanomsak Toba	January 6, 2008	House show	Osaka, Japan	3	28		
737	Kota Ibushi	February 3, 2008	House show	Tokyo, Japan	2	35		
738	Danshoku Dino	March 9, 2008	Judgement 2008	Tokyo, Japan	13	20		
739	Yasu Urano	March 29, 2008	House show	Tokyo, Japan	1	11		
740	Gentaro	April 9, 2008	House show	Tokyo, Japan	3	2		
741	Danshoku Dino	April 11, 2008	O-Hanami DDT: Final Day	Tokyo, Japan	14	25		
742	Kudo	May 6, 2008	Max Bump 2008	Tokyo, Japan	1	36	This was a tag team match in which Kudo, teaming with Yasu Urano, pinned Danshoku Dino who was teaming with Masahiro Takanashi.	
743	Gorgeous Matsuno	June 11, 2008	House show	Tokyo, Japan	7	4		
744	Mikami	June 15, 2008	House show	Osaka, Japan	5	6		
745	Michael Nakazawa	June 21, 2008	House show	Tokyo, Japan	1	<1	Took place during a battle royal.	
746	Hidex	June 21, 2008	House show	Tokyo, Japan	1	<1	An audience member.	
747	Chiririn	June 21, 2008	House show	Tokyo, Japan	1	<1	A chicken doll.	
748	Izumi	June 21, 2008	House show	Tokyo, Japan	1	<1	An audience member.	
749	Mika	June 21, 2008	House show	Tokyo, Japan	1	<1	An audience member.	
750	Mikami	June 21, 2008	House show	Tokyo, Japan	6	<1		
751	Rei Takagi	June 21, 2008	House show	Tokyo, Japan	1	<1	Sanshiro Takagi's daughter.	
752	Pink Tiger	June 21, 2008	House show	Tokyo, Japan	1	<1		
753	Heppoko Chojin	June 21, 2008	House show	Tokyo, Japan	1	<1	An audience member.	
754	Mikami	June 21, 2008	House show	Tokyo, Japan	7	<1		
755	Shoppana Yanagiya	June 21, 2008	House show	Tokyo, Japan	1	<1	Rakugo performer	
756	Mikami	June 21, 2008	House show	Tokyo, Japan	8	<1		
757	Michael Nakazawa	June 21, 2008	House show	Tokyo, Japan	2	<1		
758	Mikami	June 21, 2008	House show	Tokyo, Japan	9	4		
759	Norikazu Fujioka	June 25, 2008	House show	Unknown	1	<1		
760	Michael Nakazawa	June 25, 2008	House show	Unknown	3	11		
761	Arnold Skeskejanaker	July 6, 2008	House show	Tokyo, Japan	1	<1	Invisible wrester. Took place during a battle royal.	
762	Muscle Sakai	July 6, 2008	House show	Tokyo, Japan	5	<1		
763	Michael Nakazawa	July 6, 2008	House show	Tokyo, Japan	4	<1		
764	Arnold Skeskejanaker	July 6, 2008	House show	Tokyo, Japan	2	30		
765	Mikami	August 5, 2008	House show	Tokyo, Japan	10	<1		
766	Arnold Skeskejanaker	August 5, 2008	House show	Tokyo, Japan	3	222		
767	Albret Neklenburg	March 15, 2009	House show	Tokyo, Japan	1	<1	Invisible wrester.	
768	Bullfight Sora	March 15, 2009	House show	Tokyo, Japan	4	<1		
769	Hironosuke Izumii	March 15, 2009	House show	Tokyo, Japan	1	<1	wrestling magazine writer/editor	
770	Arnold Skeskejanaker	March 15, 2009	House show	Tokyo, Japan	4	<1		
771	Bullfight Sora	March 15, 2009	House show	Tokyo, Japan	5	<1		
772	Cherry	March 15, 2009	House show	Tokyo, Japan	3	7		
773	Tanny Mouse	March 22, 2009	House show	Warabi, Saitama, Japan	5	<1		
774	Chii Tomiya	March 22, 2009	House show	Warabi, Saitama, Japan	1	<1		
775	Cherry	March 22, 2009	House show	Warabi, Saitama,Japan	4	3		
776	Bullfight Sora	March 25, 2009	House show	Tokyo, Japan	6	10		
777	Moeka Haruhi	April 4, 2009	House show	Tokyo, Japan	1	11		
778	Bullfight Sora	April 15, 2009	House show	Tokyo, Japan	7	<1		
779	Cherry	April 15, 2009	House show	Tokyo, Japan	5	<1		
780	Toshie Uematsu	April 15, 2009	House show	Tokyo, Japan	3	9		
781	Pro Wrestling Wave poster	April 24, 2009	House show	Tokyo, Japan	1	4	An advertisement poster.	
782	Bullfight Sora	April 28, 2009	House show	Tokyo, Japan	8	<1		
783	Kasai-shi	April 28, 2009	House show	Tokyo, Japan	1	1	Stuffed doll of Jun Kasai.	
784	Takako Inoue	April 29, 2009	House show	Tokyo, Japan	1	<1	Took place during a battle royal.	
785	Apple Miyuki	April 29, 2009	House show	Tokyo, Japan	1	<1		
786	Kasai-shi	April 29, 2009	House show	Tokyo, Japan	2	<1		
787	Jaki Numazawa	April 29, 2009	House show	Tokyo, Japan	1	<1		
788	Toshie Uematsu	April 29, 2009	House show	Tokyo, Japan	4	<1		
789	Cherry	April 29, 2009	House show	Tokyo, Japan	6	<1		
790	Bullfight Sora	April 29, 2009	House show	Tokyo, Japan	9	6		
791	Danshoku Dino	May 5, 2009	House show	Tokyo, Japan	15	<1	This was a three-way match also involving Kyoko Kimura.	
792	Kasai-shi	May 5, 2009	House show	Tokyo, Japan	3	<1		
793	Aja Kong	May 5, 2009	House show	Tokyo, Japan	1	<1		
794	Kasai-shi	May 5, 2009	House show	Tokyo, Japan	4	3		
795	Yuuki	May 8, 2009	House show	Yokohama, Japan	1	<1	Referee for Big Japan Pro Wrestling.	
796	Yuichi	May 8, 2009	House show	Yokohama, Japan	1	<1		
797	Satoru	May 8, 2009	House show	Yokohama, Japan	1	<1		
798	Yuichi	May 8, 2009	House show	Yokohama, Japan	2	<1		
799	Yuuki	May 8, 2009	House show	Yokohama, Japan	2	33		
800	Big Japan Pro Wrestling ring truck	June 10, 2009	House show	Yokohama, Japan	1	<1		
801	Satoru	June 10, 2009	House show	Yokohama, Japan	2	<1		
802	Ohashi Dynamite	June 10, 2009	House show	Yokohama, Japan	1	<1		
803	Daikokubō Benkei	June 10, 2009	House show	Yokohama, Japan	1	<1		
804	Yuichi	June 10, 2009	House show	Yokohama, Japan	3	<1		
805	Bullfight Sora	June 10, 2009	House show	Yokohama, Japan	10	10		
806	A desk at Shin-Kiba 1st Ring	June 20, 2009	House show	Tokyo, Japan	1	<1		
807	Cherry	June 20, 2009	House show	Tokyo, Japan	7	<1		
808	Moeka Haruhi	June 20, 2009	House show	Tokyo, Japan	2	<1		
809	Kaoru	June 20, 2009	House show	Tokyo, Japan	1	<1		
810	Bullfight Sora	June 20, 2009	House show	Tokyo, Japan	11	<1		
811	Danshoku Dino	June 20, 2009	House show	Tokyo, Japan	16	8		
812	Michael Nakazawa	June 28, 2009	House show	Tokyo, Japan	5	<1		
813	Yoshiaki Yago	June 28, 2009	House show	Tokyo, Japan	1	<1		
814	Yoshihiko	June 28, 2009	House show	Tokyo, Japan	1	1	A sex doll with male make-up, billed as the brother of previous champion and fellow sex doll Akihiro.	
815	A desk	June 29, 2009	House show	Tokyo, Japan	1	<1		
816	A dish	June 29, 2009	House show	Tokyo, Japan	1	<1		
817	Rice	June 29, 2009	House show	Tokyo, Japan	1	<1		
818	Mitsuboshi curry	June 29, 2009	House show	Tokyo, Japan	1	<1	A dish of roux.	
819	Excellent Mince Cutlet	June 29, 2009	House show	Tokyo, Japan	1	<1	A dish of pork cutlet.	
820	Yusuke Inokuma	June 29, 2009	House show	Tokyo, Japan	11	27		
821	Guts-seijin	July 26, 2009	House show	Tokyo, Japan	1	9		
822	Yusuke Inokuma	August 4, 2009	House show	Tokyo, Japan	12	5		
823	Yoshihiko	August 9, 2009	House show	Tokyo, Japan	2	14		
824	Toru Owashi	August 23, 2009	Ryōgoku Peter Pan	Tokyo, Japan	1	<1	Took place during a battle royal.	
825	Sumo Yoshihiko	August 23, 2009	Ryōgoku Peter Pan	Tokyo, Japan	3	63	Previously held the title under the name Yoshihiko.	
826	Kota Ibushi	October 25, 2009	House show	Tokyo, Japan	3	<1		
827	Yoshihiko	October 25, 2009	House show	Tokyo, Japan	4	77		

== See also ==
- WWE Hardcore Championship – a title with a similar 24/7 rule
- WWE 24/7 Championship – another title with a similar 24/7 rule
