= DDT 9th Anniversary: Judgement 10 =

2006 DDT Pro-Wrestling event

- Promotion: DDT Pro-Wrestling
- Date: March 5, 2006
- City: Tokyo, Japan
- Venue: Shinjuku Face
- Attendance: 600

Judgement chronology
← Previous; 9	Next → 2007

DDT 9th Anniversary: Judgement 10 was a professional wrestling event promoted by DDT Pro-Wrestling (DDT). It took place on March 5, 2006, in Tokyo, Japan, at the Shinjuku Face. It was the tenth event under the Judgement name. The event aired domestically on Fighting TV Samurai.

== Storylines ==
Judgement 10 featured six professional wrestling matches that involved different wrestlers from pre-existing scripted feuds and storylines. Wrestlers portrayed villains, heroes, or less distinguishable characters in the scripted events that built tension and culminated in a wrestling match or series of matches.

== Event ==
The first match was a Rumble rules match dubbed "Jet Rumble" in which each contestant wore gloves and a fake beard.

Next was a match dubbed "Mikami's 10 Years Memorial Match" to celebrate the 10th anniversary of Mikami's pro-wrestling career.

== Results ==
No.	Results	Stipulations	Times
1	Yusuke "Jet" Inokuma won by last eliminating Futoshi "Jet" Miwa (Note: Order of elimination: Michael "Jet" Nakazawa, Akeomi "Jet" Nitta, Hara "Jet" Shima, Seiya "Jet" Morohashi, Futoshi "Jet" Miwa)	Jet Rumble	11:34
2	Super Uchuu Power and Thanomsak Toba defeated Mikami and Gorgeous Matsuno by submission	Tag team match	16:00
3	Danshoku Dino defeated Muscle Sakai by technical knockout	Singles match for the vacant GAY World Anal Championship	7:58
4	Onryo and Shinigami defeated Masa Takanashi and Poison Sawada Julie	Tag team match	12:09
5	Toru Owashi defeated Sanshiro Takagi	Singles match	20:46
6	Italian Four Horsemen (Francesco Togo and Mori Bernard) defeated Daichi Kakimoto and Kota Ibushi (c)	Tag team match for the KO-D Tag Team Championship	29:06
(c) / – the champion(s) heading into the match
