= DDT 8th Anniversary: Judgement 9 =

2005 DDT Pro-Wrestling event

- Promotion: DDT Pro-Wrestling
- Date: March 27, 2005
- City: Tokyo, Japan
- Venue: Club Heights
- Attendance: 600

Judgement chronology
← Previous; 8	Next → 10

DDT 8th Anniversary: Judgement 9 was a professional wrestling event promoted by DDT Pro-Wrestling (DDT). It took place on March 27, 2005, in Tokyo, Japan, at the Club Heights. It was the ninth event held under the Judgement name. The event aired domestically on Fighting TV Samurai.

== Storylines ==
Judgement 9 featured seven professional wrestling matches that involved different wrestlers from pre-existing scripted feuds and storylines. Wrestlers portrayed villains, heroes, or less distinguishable characters in scripted storylines that built tension and culminated in matches.

== Event ==
The event marked the debut of Jun Inomata in a six-man tag team match.

== Results ==
No.	Results	Stipulations	Times
1	Masa Takanashi defeated Cherry	Singles match	2:45
2	Daichi Kakimoto and Kudo defeated Hero! and Futoshi Miwa	Tag team match	10:50
3	Kenshin defeated Riki Senshu (c)	Singles match for the Ironman Heavymetalweight Championship	4:09
4	Danshoku Dino, Muscle Sakai and Gorgeous Matsuno defeated Akeomi Nitta, Giant and Jun Inomata by submission	Six-man tag team match	11:41
5	Sanshiro Takagi defeated Poison Sawada Julie	Singles match	13:31
6	Dick Togo (c) defeated Yusuke Inokuma by submission	Singles match for the KO-D Openweight Championship	8:27
7	FEC (Tomohiko Hashimoto and Nobutaka Moribe) (c) defeated Seiya Morohashi and Thanomsak Toba	Tag team match for the KO-D Tag Team Championship	12:12
(c) / – the champion(s) heading into the match
