= DDT 10th Anniversary: Judgement 2007 =

2007 DDT Pro-Wrestling event

- Promotion: DDT Pro-Wrestling
- Date: March 11, 2007
- City: Tokyo, Japan
- Venue: Kitazawa Town Hall
- Attendance: 294

Judgement chronology
← Previous; 10	Next → 2008

DDT 10th Anniversary: Judgement 2007 was a double professional wrestling event promoted by DDT Pro-Wrestling (DDT). It took place on March 11, 2007, in Tokyo, Japan, at the Kitazawa Town Hall. The event was split into two shows: 10th Anniversary: Judgement 2007 (also known as Judgement 11) and Judgement Anniversary Special. Both events aired domestically on Fighting TV Samurai.

== Storylines ==
The two shows featured a combined twelve professional wrestling matches that involved different wrestlers from pre-existing scripted feuds and storylines. Wrestlers portrayed villains, heroes, or less distinguishable characters in the scripted events that built tension and culminated in a wrestling match or series of matches.

== Event ==
=== Judgement 11 ===
The four-way tag team match was a battle between DDT brands. Yusuke Inokuma and Gorgeous Matsuno represented DDT, Mikami and Susumu represented Cruiser's-Game, Isami and 726 represented Union Pro Wrestling and Cho-un Shiryu and Norikazu Fujioka represented Muscle.

=== Judgement Anniversary Special ===
Opening the show was a video segment showing Naoshi Sano winning the Ironman Heavymetalweight Championship from Senpai, thus becoming the 669th champion.

The first match was the final of the Wrestling Koshien 2007 tournament held by the DDT New Attitude (DNA) sub-brand.

The third match was the "5 Minute + α Minute Limitless Battle Royal", a Championship Scramble for the Ironman Heavymetalweight Championship in which there were no interim champions but rather actual title changes because of the 24/7 rule of the championship. After twenty-three title changes, Exciting Yoshida was the winner and became the 692nd champion.

Between the fourth and fifth matches, a ladder fell on Yoshida, pinning him and becoming the 693rd champion. This was the ladder's third reign as a champion.

== Results ==
10th Anniversary: Judgement 2007 (Judgement 11)
No.	Results	Stipulations	Times
1	Aloha World Order (Prince Togo, King Ala Moana and Antonio Honda) defeated Toru Owashi, Danshoku Dino and Muscle Sakai	Six-man tag team match	13:30
2	Masa Takanashi defeated Tomomitsu Matsunaga	Singles match	03:31
3	Durian Sawada Julie and Mango Fukuda defeated Daichi Kakimoto and Michael Nakazawa	Tag team match	10:45
4	Hoshitango vs. Koo ended in a no contest	Singles match	09:23
5	Cho-un Shiryu and Norikazu Fujioka defeated Isami and 726, Yusuke Inokuma and Gorgeous Matsuno, and Mikami and Susumu	Four-way tag team match	12:45
6	Harashima, Seiya Morohashi and Kota Ibushi defeated Sanshiro Takagi, Kudo and Thanomsak Toba	Six-man tag team match	14:02

Judgement Anniversary Special
No.	Results	Stipulations	Times
1	Kengo Takai vs. Rikiya Fudo ended in a time-limit draw	Singles match – Wrestling Koshien 2007 finals	10:00
2	Tsunehito Naito defeated Thanomsak Toba by submission	Singles match	06:31
3	Exciting Yoshida (with Naomi Susan) defeated Fushicho Karasu, Kikutaro, Naoshi Sano (c), Taneichi Kacho and Yuki Miyazaki	5 Minute + α Minute Limitless Battle Royal for the Ironman Heavymetalweight Championship	14:33
4	Super Uchuu Power and Misae-chan defeated Kenshin and Cherry	Tag team match	11:35
5	Kamen Shooter Super Rider and Hero! defeated Poison Sawada Black and Kurokage	Tag team match	11:37
6	Sanshiro Takagi and Mikami defeated Masao Orihara and Nosawa Rongai	Tag team match	15:07
(c) / – the champion(s) heading into the match

5 Minute + α Minute Limitless Battle Royal Ironman Heavymetalweight Champions
Number	Wrestler	Entered	Defeated	Method
670	Yuki Miyazaki	2	Naoshi Sano	Reverse figure-four leglock
671	Naoshi Sano	1	Yuki Miyazaki	Figure-four leglock
672	Yuki Miyazaki	2	Naoshi Sano	Reverse figure-four leglock
673	Naoshi Sano	1	Yuki Miyazaki	Figure-four leglock
674	Yuki Miyazaki	2	Naoshi Sano	Reverse figure-four leglock
675	Naoshi Sano	1	Yuki Miyazaki	Figure-four leglock
676	Fushicho Karasu	3	Naoshi Sano	Lionsault
677	Yuki Miyazaki	2	Fushicho Karasu	Standing moonsault
678	Taneichi Kacho	4	Yuki Miyazaki	Diving body press
679	Naoshi Sano	1	Taneichi Kacho	Big boot
680	Kikutaro	5	Naoshi Sano	Shining wizard
681	Yuki Miyazaki	2	Kikutaro	Pinfall
682	Kikutaro	5	Yuki Miyazaki	Pinfall
683	Naomi Susan	–	Kikutaro	Splash
684	Kikutaro	5	Naomi Susan	Schoolboy
685	Taneichi Kacho	4	Kikutaro	Pinfall
686	Naoshi Sano	1	Taneichi Kacho	Lariat
687	Fushicho Karasu	3	Naoshi Sano	Rolling senton
688	Yuki Miyazaki	2	Fushicho Karasu	German suplex hold
689	Exciting Yoshida	6	Yuki Miyazaki	Screwdriver
690	Kikutaro	5	Exciting Yoshida	Small package
691	Taneichi Kacho	4	Kikutaro	Pinfall
692	Exciting Yoshida	6	Taneichi Kacho	Pinfall
