= Ultimate Tag League =

Professional wrestling tag team tournament

The Ultimate Tag League is a professional wrestling round-robin tag team tournament held by DDT Pro-Wrestling. It was created in 2000 as the DDT Tag League (Japanese: DDTタッグリーグ, Hepburn: DDT Taggu Rīgu) and was renamed KO-D (King of DDT) Tag League (KO-Dタッグリーグ, KO-D Taggu Rīgu) in 2001. In 2021, the tournament was brought back 16 years after the previous edition under its current name.

The Ultimate Tag League is held under a points system, with 2 points for a win, 1 for a draw, and 0 for a loss. From 2000 to 2003, wins by pinfall, submission or knockout were awarded 3 points and wins via countout or disqualification were only worth 2 points. Number of entrants and formats have changed over the years, with up to three blocks of participants and the occasional inclusion of semifinals. Matches in the DDT/KO-D Tag League had a 20-minute time limit. The Ultimate Tag League matches have a 30-minute time limit.

== List of winners ==
Tournament	Year	Winners (total won as an individual)	Total won as a team	Reference
DDT Tag League	2000	Koichiro Kimura and Tomohiko Hashimoto	1	
KO-D Tag League	2001	Super Uchuu Power (2) and Mikami	1	
KO-D Tag League	2002	Mikami (2) and Thanomsak Toba	1	
KO-D Tag League	2003	Tomohiko Hashimoto (2) and Seiya Morohashi	1	
KO-D Tag League	2004	Hero! and Kudo	1	
KO-D Tag League	2005	Daichi Kakimoto and Kota Ibushi	1	
Ultimate Tag League	2021	Konosuke Takeshita and Shunma Katsumata	1	
Ultimate Tag League	2022	Harashima (2) and Naomi Yoshimura	1	

== Results ==
=== 2000 ===
The 2000 DDT Tag League featured two blocks of three teams and ran from August 24 to September 14.

Final standings
Block A		Block B	
Sanshiro Takagi and Exciting Yoshida	6	Mikami and Thanomsak Toba	3
Takashi Sasaki and Yuki Nishino	3	Koichiro Kimura and Tomohiko Hashimoto	3
Poison Sawada Black and Kurokage	0	"Showa" and Neo Winger	2

Block A	Takagi Yoshida	Sawada Kurokage	Sasaki Nishino
Takagi Yoshida	—N/a	Takagi; Yoshida (10:44)	Takagi; Yoshida (14:47)
Sawada Kurokage	Takagi; Yoshida (10:44)	—N/a	Sasaki; Nishino (11:22)
Sasaki Nishino	Takagi; Yoshida (14:47)	Sasaki; Nishino (11:22)	—N/a
Block B	Mikami Toba	"Showa" Winger	Kimura Hashimoto
Mikami Toba	—N/a	"Showa"; Winger (11:18) (Note: This was a countout victory worth 2 points.)	Mikami; Toba (12:43)
"Showa" Winger	"Showa"; Winger (11:18)	—N/a	Kimura; Hashimoto (12:02)
Kimura Hashimoto	Mikami; Toba (12:43)	Kimura; Hashimoto (12:02)	—N/a

Block B Decision
B1	Mikami and Toba	8:18
B2	Kimura and Hashimoto	Pin

Final
A1	Takagi and Yoshida	15:05
B2	Kimura and Hashimoto	Sub
Third place
A2	Sasaki and Nishino	Pin
B1	Mikami and Toba	11:09

=== 2001 ===
The 2001 KO-D Tag League ran from August 25 to September 30 and saw eight teams compete in a single block, with the top two scoring teams advancing to a final. On August 16, Mikami and Super Uchuu Power vacated the KO-D Tag Team Championship and put the titles on the line in the tournament.

Final standings
Sanshiro Takagi and Sanshiro Takagi (Note: Shoichi Ichimiya under the name Sanshiro Takagi (高偽三四郎, Takagi Sanshirō), written with gi (偽, fake))	16
Super Uchuu Power and Mikami	12
Poison Sawada Julie and Hebikage	11
Takashi Sasaki and Thanomsak Toba	10
Asian Cougar and Asian Condor	9
Tomohiko Hashimoto and Retsu Maekawa	8
Issei Fujisawa and Tomohiro Ishii	6
"Showa" and "Showa" 80's	5

Results	"Showa" 80's	Fujisawa Ishii	Sasaki Toba	Cougar Condor	Takagi Takagi	Sawada Hebikage	Uchuu Mikami	Hashimoto Maekawa
"Showa" 80's	—N/a	Double; Countout (11:48)	Sasaki; Toba (13:43)	"Showa"; 80's (14:05)	Double; Countout (15:06) (Note: "Showa" 80's wrestled as Father of "Showa" in this match.)	Sawada; Hebikage (9:04)	Uchuu; Mikami (13:11)	Double; Countout (9:59)
Fujisawa Ishii	Double; Countout (11:48)	—N/a	Draw (20:00)	Cougar; Condor (10:27) (Note: Makoto Miyazawa replaced Ishii in this match.)	Takagi; Takagi (16:26)	Fujisawa; Ishii (12:51)	Uchuu; Mikami (0:36)	Draw (20:00)
Sasaki Toba	Sasaki; Toba (13:43)	Draw (20:00)	—N/a	Cougar; Condor (14:25)	Takagi; Takagi (2:02)	Sawada; Hebikage (12:17)	Sasaki; Toba (13:02)	Sasaki; Toba (14:05)
Cougar Condor	"Showa"; 80's (14:05)	Cougar; Condor (10:27)	Cougar; Condor (14:25)	—N/a	Cougar; Condor (11:53)	Sawada; Hebikage (16:54)	Uchuu; Mikami (13:14)	Hashimoto; Maekawa (11:33)
Takagi Takagi	Double; Countout (15:06)	Takagi; Takagi (16:26)	Takagi; Takagi (2:02)	Cougar; Condor (11:53)	—N/a	Takagi; Takagi (14:39)	Takagi; Takagi (15:13)	Takagi; Takagi (19:02)
Sawada Hebikage	Sawada; Hebikage (9:04)	Fujisawa; Ishii (12:51)	Sawada; Hebikage (12:17)	Sawada; Hebikage (16:54)	Takagi; Takagi (14:39)	—N/a	Uchuu; Mikami (15:18)	Sawada; Hebikage (16:51)
Uchuu Mikami	Uchuu; Mikami (13:11)	Uchuu; Mikami (0:36)	Sasaki; Toba (13:02)	Uchuu; Mikami (13:14)	Takagi; Takagi (15:13)	Uchuu; Mikami (15:18)	—N/a	Hashimoto; Maekawa (14:59)
Hashimoto Maekawa	Double; Countout (9:59)	Draw (20:00)	Sasaki; Toba (14:05)	Hashimoto; Maekawa (11:33)	Takagi; Takagi (19:02)	Sawada; Hebikage (16:51)	Hashimoto; Maekawa (14:59)	—N/a

Final
1	Takagi and Takagi	18:21
2	Uchuu and Mikami	Pin

Third place
3	Sawada and Hebikage	7:48
4	Sasaki and Toba	Pin

=== 2002 ===
The 2002 KO-D Tag League ran from July 13 to August 25 and saw eight teams compete in a single block. On May 16, Mikami had to vacate the KO-D Tag Team Championship due to an injury. It was then decided than the tournament would crown new champions. Due to a four-way tie for first place, the four teams were paired in the semifinals, with the two winners facing off in the final. Tomohiko Hashimoto suffered an injury after one match. He was temporarily replaced by JPWA Lion #1 for one match and then permanently replaced by Seiya Morohashi for the remaining matches. Morohashi suffered a mild injury too and also had to forfeit a match.

Final standings
Mikami and Thanomsak Toba	11
Super Uchuu Power and Poison Sawada Julie	11
Sanshiro Takagi and Miyuki Maeda	11
Takashi Sasaki and Gentaro	11
Kintaro Kanemura and Futoshi Miwa	10
Tachihikari and Seiya Morohashi/Tomohiko Hashimoto	9
Shoichi Ichimiya and Survival Tobita	9
Hebikage and Toguro Habukage	6

Results	Takagi Maeda	Tachihikari Morohashi/Hashimoto	Mikami Toba	Uchuu Sawada	Hebikage Habukage	Ichimiya Tobita	Kanemura Miwa	Sasaki Gentaro
Takagi Maeda	—N/a	Tachihikari; Hashimoto (15:08)	Takagi; Maeda (15:50)	Uchuu; Sawada (19:40)	Takagi; Maeda (13:14)	Ichimiya; Tobita (15:39)	Takagi; Maeda (14:52)	Takagi; Maeda (19:57)
Tachihikari Morohashi/Hashimoto	Tachihikari; Hashimoto (15:08)	—N/a	Mikami; Toba (Forfeit)	Uchuu; Sawada (17:22)	Tachihikari; Morohashi (15:39)	Tachihikari; Morohashi (14:19)	Kanemura; Miwa (11:29)	Sasaki; Gentaro (14:26) (Note: JPWA Lion #1 replaced Hashimoto in this match.)
Mikami Toba	Takagi; Maeda (15:50)	Mikami; Toba (Forfeit)	—N/a	Draw (20:00)	Mikami; Toba (15:18)	Ichimiya; Tobita (11:22)	Mikami; Toba (12:40)	Draw (20:00)
Uchuu Sawada	Uchuu; Sawada (19:40)	Uchuu; Sawada (17:22)	Draw (20:00)	—N/a	Hebikage; Habukage (17:30)	Ichimiya; Tobita (17:00)	Double; Countout (12:57)	Uchuu; Sawada (19:47)
Hebikage Habukage	Takagi; Maeda (13:14)	Tachihikari; Morohashi (15:39)	Mikami; Toba (15:18)	Hebikage; Habukage (17:30)	—N/a	Hebikage; Habukage (12:30)	Kanemura; Miwa (8:25)	Sasaki; Gentaro (16:04)
Ichimiya Tobita	Ichimiya; Tobita (15:39)	Tachihikari; Morohashi (14:19)	Ichimiya; Tobita (11:22)	Ichimiya; Tobita (17:00)	Hebikage; Habukage (12:30)	—N/a	Kanemura; Miwa (9:42)	Double; Countout (15:04)
Kanemura Miwa	Takagi; Maeda (14:52)	Kanemura; Miwa (11:29)	Mikami; Toba (12:40)	Double; Countout (12:57)	Kanemura; Miwa (8:25)	Kanemura; Miwa (9:42)	—N/a	Sasaki; Gentaro (12:52)
Sasaki Gentaro	Takagi; Maeda (19:57)	Sasaki; Gentaro (14:26)	Draw (20:00)	Uchuu; Sawada (19:47)	Sasaki; Gentaro (16:04)	Double; Countout (15:04)	Sasaki; Gentaro (12:52)	—N/a

Semifinals
3	Takagi and Maeda	19:50
2	Uchuu and Sawada	Pin
1	Mikami and Toba	Pin
4	Sasaki and Gentaro	18:28

Final
2	Uchuu and Sawada	25:52
1	Mikami and Toba	Pin
Third place
3	Takagi and Maeda	19:48
4	Sasaki and Gentaro	Pin

=== 2003 ===
The 2003 KO-D Tag League was held from September 11 to September 28 and featured two blocks of five teams. On the first day of the tournament, the KO-D Tag Team Champions Team Karamawari (Takashi Sasaki and Thanomsak Toba) lost their match against Super Uchuu Power and Super Uchuu Power Omega. They decided to vacate the titles in order to put them up for grab in the tournament.

Final standings
Block A		Block B	
Takashi Sasaki and Thanomsak Toba	9	Tomohiko Hashimoto and Seiya Morohashi	7
Super Uchuu Power and Super Uchuu Power Omega	7	Kyosuke Sasaki and Ryu Echigo	6
Kudo and Hero!	6	Sanshiro Takagi and Yoshihiro Sakai	6
Danshoku Dino and O.K.Revolution	4	Gill Nakano and Dumbo Matsumoto	5
Ricky Fuji and Yusuke Inokuma	3	Badboy Hido and Shuji Ishikawa	4

Block A	T. Sasaki Toba	Kudo Hero!	Uchuu Omega	Fuji Inokuma	Dino Revolution
T. Sasaki Toba	—N/a	T. Sasaki; Toba (10:47)	Uchuu; Omega (15:17)	T. Sasaki; Toba (12:40)	T. Sasaki; Toba (15:08)
Kudo Hero!	T. Sasaki; Toba (10:47)	—N/a	Kudo; Hero! (14:05)	Kudo; Hero! (12:57)	Dino; Revolution (12:04)
Uchuu Omega	Uchuu; Omega (15:17)	Kudo; Hero! (14:05)	—N/a	Uchuu; Omega (10:50)	Draw (20:00)
Fuji Inokuma	T. Sasaki; Toba (12:40)	Kudo; Hero! (12:57)	Uchuu; Omega (10:50)	—N/a	Fuji; Inokuma (13:06)
Dino Revolution	T. Sasaki; Toba (15:08)	Dino; Revolution (12:04)	Draw (20:00)	Fuji; Inokuma (13:06)	—N/a
Block B	Takagi Sakai	Hashimoto Morohashi	Nakano Matsumoto	Hido Ishikawa	K. Sasaki Echigo
Takagi Sakai	—N/a	Hashimoto; Morohashi (16:39)	Takagi; Sakai (10:39) (Note: This was a ladder match.)	Takagi; Sakai (10:42)	K. Sasaki; Echigo (12:10)
Hashimoto Morohashi	Hashimoto; Morohashi (16:39)	—N/a	Double; Countout (8:22)	Hashimoto; Morohashi (8:27) (Note: This was a Scramble Bunkhouse Deathmatch.)	K. Sasaki; Echigo (13:08)
Nakano Matsumoto	Takagi; Sakai (10:39)	Double; Countout (8:22)	—N/a	Double; Countout (9:18)	Nakano; Matsumoto (5:59)
Hido Ishikawa	Takagi; Sakai (10:42)	Hashimoto; Morohashi (8:27)	Double; Countout (9:18)	—N/a	Hido; Ishikawa (12:13)
K. Sasaki Echigo	K. Sasaki; Echigo (12:10)	K. Sasaki; Echigo (13:08)	Nakano; Matsumoto (5:59)	Hido; Ishikawa (12:13)	—N/a

Final
A1	T. Sasaki and Toba	14:09
B1	Hashimoto and Morohashi	Pin

=== 2004 ===
The 2004 KO-D Tag League was held from September 16 to September 30 and featured three blocks of four teams. The points system was changed to a more traditional system of 2 points for a victory and 1 point for a draw. The winners would also win the vacant KO-D Tag Team Championship.

Final standings
Block A		Block B		Block C	
Hero! and Kudo	5	Tomohiko Hashimoto and Seiya Morohashi	6	Poison Sawada Julie and Clone Boy Jami	6
Sanshiro Takagi and Kota Ibushi	3	Takashi Sasaki and Gentaro	4	Danshoku Dino and Glenn "Q" Spectre	4
Masahiro Takanashi and Mineo Fujita	2	Muscle Sakai and Riki Senshu	2	Koichiro Kimura and Kenshin	2
Shoichi Ichimiya and Gorgeous Matsuno	2	Giant and Kuma Sentoin	0	Daichi Kakimoto and Futoshi Miwa	0

Block A	Takanashi Fujita	Takagi Ibushi	Kudo Hero!	Ichimiya Matsuno
Takanashi Fujita	–	Takagi; Ibushi (10:21)	Kudo; Hero! (11:30)	Takanashi; Fujita (4:55)
Takagi Ibushi	Takagi; Ibushi (10:21)	–	Draw (20:00)	Ichimiya; Matsuno (14:50)
Kudo Hero!	Kudo; Hero! (11:30)	Draw (20:00)	–	Kudo; Hero! (10:29)
Ichimiya Matsuno	Takanashi; Fujita (4:55)	Ichimiya; Matsuno (14:50)	Kudo; Hero! (10:29)	–
Block B	Hashimoto Morohashi	Sasaki Gentaro	Giant Sentoin	Sakai Senshu
Hashimoto Morohashi	–	Hashimoto; Morohashi (13:34)	Hashimoto; Morohashi (9:01)	Hashimoto; Morohashi (9:01)
Sasaki Gentaro	Hashimoto; Morohashi (13:34)	–	Sasaki; Gentaro (9:20)	Sasaki; Gentaro (7:31)
Giant Sentoin	Hashimoto; Morohashi (9:01)	Sasaki; Gentaro (9:20)	–	Sakai; Senshu (12:45)
Sakai Senshu	Hashimoto; Morohashi (9:01)	Sasaki; Gentaro (7:31)	Sakai; Senshu (12:45)	–
Block C	Sawada Jami	Kimura Kenshin	Dino Spectre	Kakimoto Miwa
Sawada Jami	–	Sawada; Jami (14:58)	Sawada; Jami (11:20)	Sawada; Jami (15:12)
Kimura Kenshin	Sawada; Jami (14:58)	–	Dino; Spectre (13:17)	Kimura; Kenshin (11:52)
Dino Spectre	Sawada; Jami (11:20)	Dino; Spectre (13:17)	–	Dino; Spectre (17:58)
Kakimoto Miwa	Sawada; Jami (15:12)	Kimura; Kenshin (11:52)	Dino; Spectre (17:58)	–

Playoff
A2	Takagi and Ibushi	16:09
B2	Sasaki and Gentaro
C2	Dino and Spectre	Pin

Semifinals
C1	Sawada and Jami	13:04
C2	Dino and Spectre	Pin
A1	Hero! and Kudo	Pin
B1	Hashimoto and Morohashi	9:21

Final
C2	Dino and Spectre	15:10
A1	Hero! and Kudo	Pin

=== 2005 ===
The 2005 KO-D Tag League featured two blocks of four teams and ran from September 10 to September 23. Toru Owashi was forced to drop out of the tournament after his first match and forfeited his remaining matches. Due to a three-way tie for first place in block B, the three teams faced off in a three-way decision match, with the winners advancing to the final.

Final standings
Block A		Block B	
Danshoku Dino and Glenn "Q" Spectre	4	Shoichi Ichimiya and Poison Sawada	4
Sanshiro Takagi and Muscle Sakai	3	Francesco Togo and Don Maestro	4
Seiya Morohashi and Thanomsak Toba	3	Daichi Kakimoto and Kota Ibushi	4
Toru Owashi and Darkside Hero!	2	Mikami and Gorgeous Matsuno	0

Block A	Dino Spectre	Owashi Hero!	Takagi Sakai	Morohashi Toba
Dino Spectre	–	Dino; Spectre (Forfeit)	Takagi; Sakai (13:44)	Dino; Spectre (17:25)
Owashi Hero!	Dino; Spectre (Forfeit)	–	Owashi; Hero! (10:19)	Morohashi; Toba (Forfeit)
Takagi Sakai	Takagi; Sakai (13:44)	Owashi; Hero! (10:19)	–	Draw (20:00)
Morohashi Toba	Dino; Spectre (17:25)	Morohashi; Toba (Forfeit)	Draw (20:00)	–
Block B	Ichimiya Sawada	Togo Maestro	Kakimoto Ibushi	Mikami Matsuno
Ichimiya Sawada	–	Ichimiya; Sawada (13:46)	Kakimoto; Ibushi (14:05)	Ichimiya; Sawada (17:02)
Togo Maestro	Ichimiya; Sawada (13:46)	–	Togo; Maestro (15:23)	Togo; Maestro (11:56)
Kakimoto Ibushi	Kakimoto; Ibushi (14:05)	Togo; Maestro (15:23)	–	Kakimoto; Ibushi (9:24)
Mikami Matsuno	Ichimiya; Sawada (17:02)	Togo; Maestro (11:56)	Kakimoto; Ibushi (9:24)	–

Block B Decision
B1	Ichimiya and Sawada
B2	Togo and Maestro	11:10
B3	Kakimoto and Ibushi	Pin

Final
A1	Dino and Spectre	18:22
B3	Kakimoto and Ibushi	Pin

=== 2021 ===
The Ultimate Tag League 2021 ran from May 9 to May 27 and featured five teams competing in a single block with the team scoring the most points to be declared the winners. Due to a tie, the top two scoring teams faced off in a tie-breaker. The time limit for the matches was increased from 20 minutes to 30 minutes.

Final standings
Konosuke Takeshita and Shunma Katsumata (The 37Kamiina)	5
Daisuke Sasaki and Yuji Hino (Damnation)	5
Jun Akiyama and Makoto Oishi (Junretsu)	4
Kazusada Higuchi and Yukio Sakaguchi (Eruption)	4
Chris Brookes and Antonio Honda (The Iyasarerus)	2

Results	Higuchi Sakaguchi	Akiyama Oishi	Takeshita Katsumata	Brookes Honda	Sasaki Hino
Higuchi Sakaguchi	—N/a	Akiyama; Oishi (15:47)	Higuchi; Sakaguchi (20:25)	Higuchi; Sakaguchi (15:18)	Sasaki; Hino (14:40)
Akiyama Oishi	Akiyama; Oishi (15:47)	—N/a	Takeshita; Katsumata (18:10)	Brookes; Honda (13:09)	Akiyama; Oishi (14:12)
Takeshita Katsumata	Higuchi; Sakaguchi (20:25)	Takeshita; Katsumata (18:10)	—N/a	Takeshita; Katsumata (17:22)	Draw (30:00)
Brookes Honda	Higuchi; Sakaguchi (15:18)	Brookes; Honda (13:09)	Takeshita; Katsumata (17:22)	—N/a	Sasaki; Hino (13:54)
Sasaki Hino	Sasaki; Hino (14:40)	Akiyama; Oishi (14:12)	Draw (30:00)	Sasaki; Hino (13:54)	—N/a

Tie-breaker
1	Sasaki and Hino	14:37
2	Takeshita and Katsumata	Pin

=== 2022 ===
The 2022 Ultimate Tag League ran from January 30 to February 27. This edition featured ten teams competing in two blocks. On January 3, Harashima and Naomi Yoshimura vacated the KO-D Tag Team Championship so it could be put up for grab in the tournament. Danshoku "Dandy" Dino was originally scheduled to represent Pheromones but had to be pulled off the tournament when he was diagnosed with COVID-19 symptoms days before the start. He was replaced by Yumehito "Fantastic" Imanari. CDK, the team of Chris Brookes and Masahiro Takanashi, had to forfeit multiples matches due to various medical reasons.

Final standings
Block A		Block B	
Konosuke Takeshita and Yuki Ueno (The 37Kamiina)	6	Harashima and Naomi Yoshimura (Disaster Box)	6
Tetsuya Endo and Jun Akiyama (Burning)	6	Yuki "Sexy" Iino and Yumehito "Fantastic" Imanari (Pheromones)	4
Yuji Hino and Yukio Naya	4	Daisuke Sasaki and MJ Paul (Damnation T.A)	4
Kazusada Higuchi and Hideki Okatani (Eruption)	2	Chris Brookes and Masahiro Takanashi (Calamari Drunken Kings)	4
Shuji Kondo and Kazuki Hirata	0	Shunma Katsumata and Mao (The37Kamiina)	2

Block A	Takeshita Ueno	Endo Akiyama	Higuchi Okatani	Hino Naya	Kondo Hirata
Takeshita Ueno	—N/a	Takeshita; Ueno (24:09)	Higuchi; Okatani (19:51)	Takeshita; Ueno (18:28)	Takeshita; Ueno (14:10)
Endo Akiyama	Takeshita; Ueno (24:09)	—N/a	Endo; Akiyama (19:37)	Endo; Akiyama (14:40)	Endo; Akiyama (12:10)
Higuchi Okatani	Higuchi; Okatani (19:51)	Endo; Akiyama (19:37)	—N/a	Hino; Naya (Forfeit)	No Contest
Hino Naya	Takeshita; Ueno (18:28)	Endo; Akiyama (14:40)	Hino; Naya (Forfeit)	—N/a	Hino; Naya (11:26)
Kondo Hirata	Takeshita; Ueno (14:10)	Endo; Akiyama (12:10)	No Contest	Hino; Naya (11:26)	—N/a
Block B	Harashima Yoshimura	Brookes Takanashi	Sasaki Paul	Katsumata Mao	Iino Imanari
Harashima Yoshimura	—N/a	Brookes; Takanashi (19:13)	Harashima; Yoshimura (21:52)	Harashima; Yoshimura (14:41)	Harashima; Yoshimura (12:30)
Brookes Takanashi	Brookes; Takanashi (19:13)	—N/a	Sasaki; Paul (Forfeit)	Brookes; Takanashi (7:03)	Iino; Imanari (Forfeit)
Sasaki Paul	Harashima; Yoshimura (21:52)	Sasaki; Paul (Forfeit)	—N/a	Katsumata; Mao (12:40)	Sasaki; Paul (16:32)
Katsumata Mao	Harashima; Yoshimura (14:41)	Brookes; Takanashi (7:03)	Katsumata; Mao (12:40)	—N/a	Iino; Imanari (9:35)
Iino Imanari	Harashima; Yoshimura (12:30)	Iino; Imanari (Forfeit)	Sasaki; Paul (16:32)	Iino; Imanari (9:35)	—N/a

Final
A1	Takeshita and Ueno	20:14
B1	Harashima and Yoshimura	Pin

== See also ==
- Global Tag League
- Rey de Parejas
- World Tag League
- World's Strongest Tag League
- DDT Pro-Wrestling
- Professional wrestling in Japan
