= Kazuhiko Ogasawara =

Japanese professional wrestler

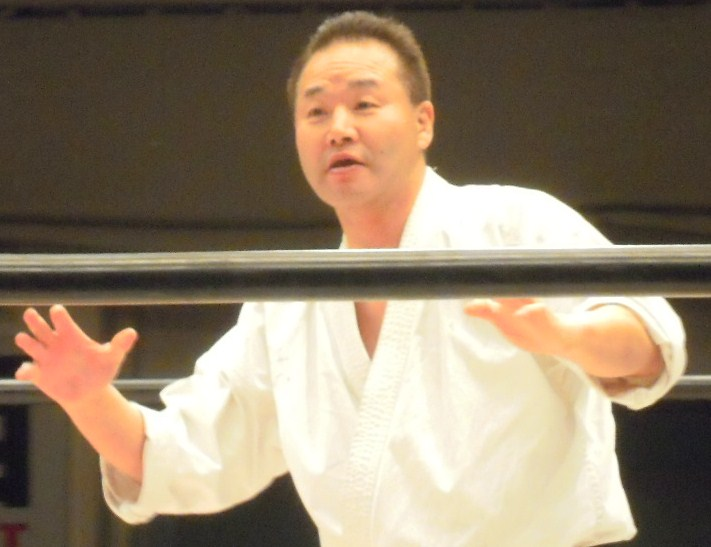
- Ogasawara in December 2010

Personal information
- Born: December 12, 1959 (age 66) Shizuoka, Japan

Professional wrestling career
- Ring name(s): The Great Sensei Ogasawara; Kazuhiko Ogasawara; Zebraman
- Billed height: 177 cm (5 ft 10 in)
- Billed weight: 88 kg (194 lb)
- Debut: 2002

Kazuhiko Ogasawara (小笠原和彦, Ogasawara Kazuhiko) is a Japanese professional wrestler and karateka best known for his tenure in the Japanese promotions Pro Wrestling Zero1 and Pro Wrestling Freedoms.

== Professional wrestling career ==
=== Independent circuit (2006–present) ===
Ogasawara is known for seldomly competing for various promotions from the Japanese independent scene. On the tenth night of All Japan Pro Wrestling's Excite Series 2003 from February 23, he teamed up with Masato Tanaka, Ryoji Sai and Shinjiro Otani in a losing effort against Arashi, Kendo Kashin, Nobutaka Araya and Satoshi Kojima as a result of an eight-man tag team match. Ogasawara often competed as a guest in various women's promotions. At NEO Be Happy Again ~ 10th Anniversary, an event promoted on January 6, 2008, by NEO Japan Ladies Pro-Wrestling, he fought in a 30-person battle royal won by Mima Shimoda and also involving notable opponents such as Aoi Kizuki, Arisa Nakajima, Choun Shiryu, Azumi Hyuga, Yoshiko Tamura and many others. At Ice Ribbon New Ice Ribbon #275 ~ Ice Ribbon March, an event promoted by Ice Ribbon on March 21, 2011, Ogasawara teamed up with Chii Tomiya in a losing effort against Jun Kasai and Miyako Matsumoto as a result of a hardcore rules match. At Makoto Debut 15th Anniversary Show, an independent show produced by Makoto on November 1, 2021, Ogasawara competed in a battle royal won by Mizuki and also involving Emi Sakura, Hagane Shinnou, Haruka Kato, Masahiro Takanashi, Minoru Tanaka, Yuu Yamagata and others.

=== Pro Wrestling Zero1 (2002–2009) ===
Ogasawara made his professional wrestling debut at ZERO-ONE Truth Century Creation 2002 on March 2, where he defeated Ryoji Sai by referee's decision. He continued to mark appearances at the "Century Creation" events, competing at the 2003 edition from March 2, where he teamed up with Naohiro Hoshikawa and Yoshihito Sasaki in a losing effort against Kaz Hayashi, Kendo Kashin and Ryuji Hijikata.

=== DDT Pro-Wrestling (2005–2015) ===
Ogasawara made sporadic appearances in DDT Pro-Wrestling, mainly focusing on the Ironman Heavymetalweight Championship, title which he has won on six separate occasions. At Koichiro Kimura Memorial Show, a cross-over event held by DDT, Pro Wrestling Freedoms and Apache Pro-Wrestling Army on December 8, 2014, he competed in a battle royal won by Kintaro Kanemura and also involving Mitsunobu Kikuzawa, Poison Sawada Julie, Ricky Fuji, Naoshi Sano, Daisaku Shimoda and many others. At DDT/Shuten Doji Produce What Are Cherry Blossoms Without Sake on July 22, 2015, he teamed up with Emi Sakura and Masa Tanakashi to defeat The Brahman Brothers (Brahman Kei & Brahman Shu) and Gorgeous Matsuno.

==== Ganbare Pro-Wrestling (2013–2015) ====
Ogasawara also worked for Ganbare Pro-Wrestling while the promotion was still under the patronage of DDT. He made his first appearance at DDT Ganbare Pro-Wrestling "Ganpuro Houseshow 2" on May 9, 2013, where he teamed up with Osamu Namiguchi to defeat Batten Blabla and Ken Ohka.

== Championships and accomplishments ==
- Capture International
  - Capture International Championship (1 time)
- DDT Pro-Wrestling
  - Ironman Heavymetalweight Championship (6 times)
- EXIT Pro Wrestling Underground
  - WUW World Underground Championship (1 time)
- Tokyo Sports Puroresu Awards
  - Rookie Of The Year (2002)
