= Shoichi Ichimiya =

Japanese professional wrestler

Personal information
- Born: February 14, 1969 (age 57) Tokyo, Japan

Professional wrestling career
- Ring name(s): See below Ichiba Shin "Ichi"; Shoichi Ichimiya
- Billed height: 1.80 m (5 ft 11 in)
- Billed weight: 120 kg (265 lb)
- Debut: 1997
- Retired: 2014

Shoichi Ichimiya (一宮章一, Ichimiya Shōichi) is a Japanese professional wrestler and former mixed martial artist working for various Japanese professional wrestling promotions such as DDT Pro-Wrestling (DDT) and Apache Pro-Wrestling Army.

== Professional wrestling career ==
=== Independent circuit (1997–2014) ===
Ichimiya made his professional wrestling debut at WAR 5th Anniversary of WAR & 10th Anniversary of the Tenryu Revolution, an event produced by Wrestler Association-R on July 6, 1997, where he teamed up with Shigeo Okumura and Tomohiro Ishii to defeat Masaaki Mochizuki, Takashi Okamura and Yoshikazu Taru in a six-man tag team match. On March 6, 1998, he competed at IWA Japan FUTURE TRIAL TOUR’98, an event produced by International Wrestling Association of Japan, where he teamed up with Tomohiro Ishii in a losing effort to Keisuke Yamada and Takeshi Sato. On January 25, 2003, Ichimiya teamed up with Masao Orihara, Mr. Pogo, Ofune and Goemon in a losing effort to Mitsuhiro Matsunaga, Mr. Gannosuke, Kazuya Yuasa, Command Bolshoi and Bad Boy Hido in a ten-person tag team match which took place at Battle Decisive East vs. West, a freelance event. His last known match was at All Japan Pro Wrestling's Suwamachi Revitalization Vol. 9 event from October 30, 2016, where he defeated Fuminori Abe under the name of Ichiba Shin "Ichi".

=== Dramatic Dream Team/DDT Pro Wrestling (2002–2009) ===
Ichimiya is a former KO-D Tag Team Champion, title which he won at DDT Max Bump 2003 on May 18, by teaming up with Seiya Morohashi to defeat Super Uchuu Power and Takashi Sasaki in a tournament final for the vacant titles. Ichimiya participated in a 14-person battle royal for the Ironman Heavymetalweight Championship, appearing two times under the ring name of Giru Nakano and Keigi Mutoh parodies of the real wrestlers Bull Nakano and Keiji Mutoh, competing against many popular wrestling figures such as the winner Toru Owashi, Michael Nakazawa, Riho and Yumiko Hotta at Ryōgoku Peter Pan 2009 on August 23. He won the KO-D Openweight Championship at DDT Dead Or Alive 2003 on October 26 by defeating Takashi Sasaki in a chain deathmatch.

== Professional wrestling persona ==
Throughout his career, Ichimiya has used many ring names that were parodies of real wrestlers. Those names were usually based on word play and included the kanji 偽 (gi), meaning "fake". Once romanized, some of those names can be indistinguishable from the real names. Those ring names included:

- Sanshiro Takagi (高偽三四郎, Takagi Sanshirō; based on Sanshiro Takagi)
- Shinya Hagimoto (は偽本真也, Hagimoto Shin'ya; based on Shinya Hashimoto)
- Mitsuharu Gisawa (偽沢光晴, Gisawa Mitsuharu; based on Mitsuharu Misawa)
- Maginum Tokyo (マ偽ナムTOKYO, Maginamu Tōkyō; based on Magnum Tokyo)
- Gyun Kasai (葛西偽ゅん, Kasai Gyun; based on Jun Kasai)
- Poison Ichimiya Gyulie (ポイズン一宮偽ュリー, Poizun Ichimiya Gyurī; based on Poison Sawada Julie)
- Yoshigiro Takayama (高山善偽ろ, Takayama Yoshigiro; based on Yoshihiro Takayama)
- Agira Hokuto (北斗ア偽ラ, Hokuto Agira; based on Akira Hokuto)
- Tarzan Gito (ターザン偽藤, Tāzan Gitō; based on Tarzan Goto)

== Mixed martial arts career ==
Ichimiya debuted as a mixed martial artist as a heavyweight at Deep: 6th Impact, on September 7, 2002, falling short to Kazuki Okubo by way of armbar. At Deep: 7th Impact, he scored the first draw of his career against Azteca. Hos last known contest was a loss against Hidehisa Matsuda by way of a rear-naked choke at Deep: 10th Impact from June 25, 2003. His final record of the career was (0-2-1).

=== Mixed martial arts record ===
Professional record breakdown
3 matches	0 wins	2 losses
By submission	0	2
Draws	1	

Res.	Record	Opponent	Method	Event	Date	Round	Time	Location	Notes
Loss	0–2–1	Hidehisa Matsuda	Technical Submission (rear-naked choke)	Deep: 10th Impact	June 25, 2003	1	3:39	Tokyo, Japan	
Draw	0–1–1	Azteca	Draw (unanimous)	Deep: 7th Impact	December 12, 2002	3	5:00	Tokyo, Japan	
Loss	0–1	Kazuki Okubo	Submission (armbar)	Deep: 6th Impact	September 7, 2002	1	2:41	Tokyo, Japan	

== Championships and accomplishments ==
- Apache Pro-Wrestling Army

- WEW World Tag Team Championship (1 time) – with Tomohiko Hashimoto

- Dramatic Dream Team/DDT Pro-Wrestling

- Ironman Heavymetalweight Championship (20 times)
- KO-D Openweight Championship (1 time)
- KO-D Tag Team Championship (1 time) – with Seiya Morohashi

- Guts World Pro-Wrestling

- GWC 6-Man Tag Team Championship (1 time) – with Daisuke and Yuri Urai

- International Wrestling Association of Japan

- IWA World Tag Team Championship (1 time) – with Jun Izumida
