= Thanomsak Toba =

Japanese wrestler (born 1975)

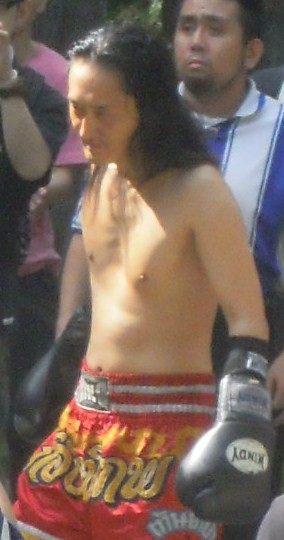
- Toba in September 2012

Personal information
- Born: Makoto Hatori; July 14, 1975 (age 51) Tsuchiura, Japan

Professional wrestling career
- Ring name(s): Muay Thai Brahman; Thisbe Bow Koga; Makoto Hatori; Thanomsak Toba
- Billed height: 1.76 m (5 ft 9 in)
- Billed weight: 65 kg (143 lb)
- Trained by: Koki Kitahara
- Debut: 1998

Thanomsak Toba (タノムサク鳥羽, Tanomusaku Toba) is a Japanese professional wrestler, currently working for the Japanese professional wrestling promotion Dramatic Dream Team (DDT). His ring name is an hommage to Thai professional boxer Thanomsak Sithbaobay.

== Professional wrestling career ==
=== Independent circuit (1998–present) ===
Toba worked for several other promotions such as Gatoh Move Pro Wrestling, where at the Gatoh Move Japan Tour #183 from August 15, 2015, he participated in a 18-person battle royal facing notable opponents like Emi Sakura, Riho and Gabai-jichan. At K-DOJO Valentine's Day Kiss, an event produced by Kaientai Dojo on February 14, 2016, Toba teamed up with his long time tag team partner Mikami to defeat Kaji Tomato and Bambi. Another notable promotion in which he activated was the Inoki Genome Federation, where at IGF Genome36, an event hosted on May 29, 2016, he unsuccessfully challenged Kota Ibushi.

=== Dramatic Dream Team (1998–present) ===
Toba made his professional wrestling debut in his long-tenuring promotion Dramatic Dream Team at a house show hosted by them on January 31, 1998, where he fell short to Hidetomo Egawa. He participated in one of the longest matches in professional wrestling history, a 108-man battle royal at Tenka Sanbun no Kei: New Year's Eve Special, a cross-over event held between Big Japan Pro Wrestling, DDT and Kaientai Dojo from December 31, 2009, competing against other infamous wrestlers such as Great Kojika, Taka Michinoku, Kenny Omega, Abdullah Kobayashi, and the winner of the match, Jun Kasai.

Toba took part of many signature events of DDT. At Ryōgoku Peter Pan 2010 on July 25, he teamed up with his Suicide Boyz tag partner Mikami and won a Gauntlet tag team match to determine the #1 contenders to the KO-D Tag Team Championship, also involving Wild Snake (Manabu Nakanishi and Poison Sawada Julie), Ningen Shitei (Toru Owashi and Yukihiro Abe), Massive Brothers (Muscle Sakai and Jiro Hachimitsu) and Josai International (Goro Tsurumi and Tomomitsu Matsunaga). At Ryōgoku Peter Pan 2011 on July 24, he participated in an Ironman Rumble for the Ironman Heavymetalweight Championship also involving Antonio Honda, Daisuke Sasaki, Emi Sakura, Yuzuki Aikawa, and Tsuyoshi Kikuchi. At Budokan Peter Pan 2012 from August 18, he teamed up with Yasu Urano, Antonio Honda, Yuji Hino and Yoshiko) as Akira-waku FC losing to Tonkatsu SC (Masa Takanashi, Daisuke Sasaki, Hoshitango, Tetsuya Endo and Tsukasa Fujimoto) in a 5 vs. 5 Soccer match score 2-0 on penalties. At Ryōgoku Peter Pan 2018 from October 21, Toba teamed up with Keisuke Okuda and participated in a Gauntlet tag team match which also involved Shuten-dōji (Kudo and Masahiro Takanashi), Mike Bailey and Antonio Honda, Renegades (Mizuki Watase and Jason "The Gift" Kincaid), Kazusada Higuchi and Kota Umeda, and Tomomitsu Matsunaga and Michael Nakazawa.

At Judgement 2008, Toba teamed up with Mikami, Takashi Sasaki and Gentaro, falling short to Sanshiro Takagi, Poison Sawada Julie, Super Uchuu Power and Tomohiko Hashimoto in an Eight-man tag team match. At Judgement 2011 from March 27, Toba teamed up with Hikaru Sato and Rion Mizuki to defeat Tsunehito Naito, Akito and Kazuki Hirata in a Six-man tag team match.

He participated in several Ultimate Tag League events, the last of them being the 2005 edition, where he teamed up with Seiya Morohashi, placing themselves in the A Block and scoring a total of three points after going against the teams of Danshoku Dino and Glenn "Q" Spectre, Sanshiro Takagi and Muscle Sakai, and Toru Owashi and Darkside Hero!.

Toba is known to have competed in various tournaments promoted by DDT. One of them is the King of DDT Tournament, event where he made his first appearance at the 2010 edition, which was also a no.1 contendership tournament for the KO-D Openweight Championship where he fell short to Keisuke Ishii in a first round match. He made his last performance at the 2018 edition of the event where he defeated Yuki Ueno in the first round and falling short to Kazusada Higuchi in the second round.

== Championships and accomplishments ==
- DDT Pro-Wrestling

- Ironman Heavymetalweight Championship (5 times)
- KO-D Tag Team Championship (5 times) – with Mikami (2), Takashi Sasaki (1) and Seiya Morohashi (2)
- KO-D 10-Man Tag Team Championship (1 time) – with Gentaro, Poison Sawada Julie, Takashi Sasaki and Mikami
- World Ōmori Championship (1 time)
- KO-D Tag League (2002) – with Mikami
- KO-D Tag Team Title League (2008) – with Mikami
