= Survival Tobita =

Japanese professional wrestler

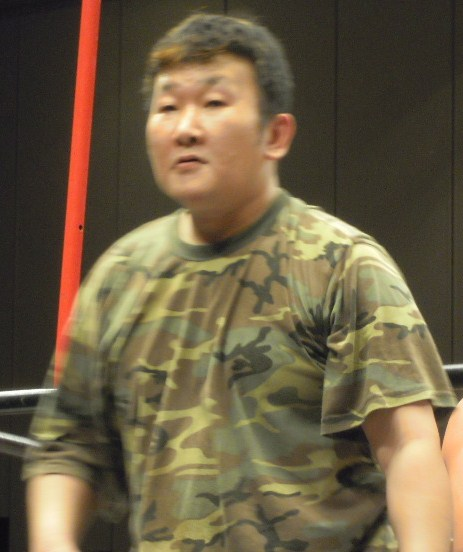

Personal information
- Born: June 1, 1969 (age 57) Tsurugashima, Saitama, Japan

Professional wrestling career
- Ring name(s): Jigoku Soldier; Masaru Tobita; Survival Tobita
- Billed height: 1.70 m (5 ft 7 in)
- Billed weight: 98 kg (216 lb)
- Trained by: Shunji Takano
- Debut: April 16, 1994

Masaru Tobita (飛田 将, Tobita Masaru; born June 1, 1969), better known as Survival Tobita (サバイバル飛田, Sabaibaru Tobita), is a Japanese professional wrestler who owns and wrestles for the Saitama Pro Wrestling Company (SPWC).

== Career ==
Survival Tobita started as a jobber for Pro Wrestling Crusaders (PWC). Since its collapse, he has wrestled for various companies in Japan and Mexico including Michinoku Pro Wrestling, Onita Pro, Frontier Martial-Arts Wrestling (FMW), Dramatic Dream Team (DDT), and Consejo Mundial de Lucha Libre (CMLL). He is also the owner of the Saitama Pro Wrestling Company (SPWC). Survival Tobita's most known matches in SPWC are hardcore matches, usually on mats, against various monsters from around the universe (usually portrayed by Naoshi Sano). Tobita often sits down after his match and cuts long promos while the fans leave their seats and exit the building.

Tobita's most famous matches were against Mokujin Ken, also known as Ken The Box. Ken was a tree-like figure based on the character Mokujin from the Tekken video game series. Owing to Ken's super human strengths, all of their bouts were basically squashes with Ken easily winning in minutes via knockout.

== Championships and accomplishments ==
- Dramatic Dream Team
  - Ironman Heavymetalweight Championship (3 times) – as Jigoku Soldier
- Un Employment Pro Wrestling
  - EGE Championship
