= Poison Julie Sawada =

Japanese professional wrestler

Poison Sawada Julie
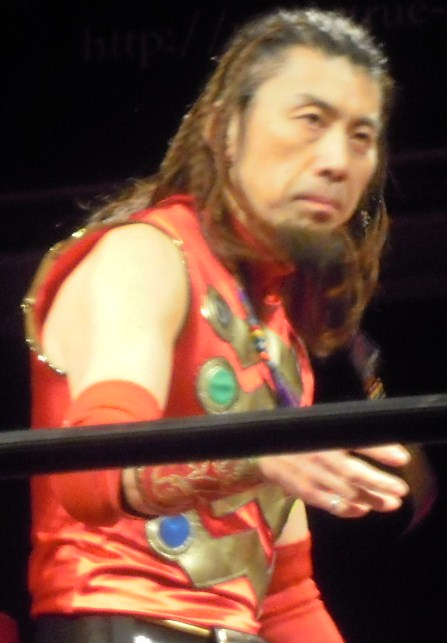
- Sawada in January 2012

Personal information
- Born: Atsuo Sawada; February 5, 1964 (age 62) Chūō, Tokyo, Japan

Professional wrestling career
- Ring names: Cyborg Jakaider; Durian Sawada Julie; Ho Chi Minh; Ho Death Minh; Poison Julie Sawada; Poison Sawada; Poison Sawada Black; Poison Sawada Julie
- Billed height: 1.82 m (6 ft 0 in)
- Billed weight: 90 kg (200 lb)
- Trained by: NJPW Dojo; Boris Malenko
- Debut: June 1988
- Retired: November 25, 2012

Atsuo Sawada (澤田 篤男, Sawada Atsuo; born February 5, 1964) is a Japanese semi-retired professional wrestler, best known for his work in Dramatic Dream Team (today DDT Pro-Wrestling) under the ring names Poison Sawada Julie (ポイズン澤田JULIE, Poizun Sawada Jurī) and Poison Julie Sawada (ポイズンJULIE澤田, Poizun Jurī Sawada) among others. He is a former two-time KO-D Openweight Champion, ten-time and inaugural Ironman Heavymetalweight Champion, two-time Jiyūgaoka 6-Person Tag Team Champion and one-time KO-D 10-Man Tag Team Champion. He is also the winner of the 2004 King of DDT Tournament.

Sawada's best-known gimmick is that of a human serpent (蛇人間, hebi ningen), having suffered from venom during a match which made him possessed by a serpent god, giving him the ability to control his opponents' minds by waving two fingers at them while the audience mimics the sound of a rattlesnake. Sawada also used a poison mist that would turn its victims into a snake-like version of themselves, controlled by Sawada. This change in allegiance would be reflected in a change in their ring name, which often included a play on words involving the kanji 蛇 (ja; "snake") or some other snake-based pun, such as Mitsuya Nagai becoming Mitsuya Jagai (蛇が井満也, Jagai Mitsuya) or Mikami becoming Mijami.

== Professional wrestling career ==
=== Early career (1981–1999) ===
Sawada joined the New Japan Pro-Wrestling (NJPW) dojo in 1981, but was forced to resign two years later due to injuries. He then traveled to America to train under Boris Malenko, before making his official in-ring debut in Miami, Florida in June 1988 against Paul Drake, as a Vietnamese character named Ho Chi Minh. On his return to Japan in 1992, he changed his name to Ho Death Minh and joined Pro Wrestling Crusaders (PWC).

In 1993, Sawada formed IWA Nagareyama, one of the promotions under the Wrestling Union umbrella, alongside Goro Tsurumi who established IWA Kakutō Shijuku, and Masahiko Takasugi who established IWA Shonan. The following year, the Wrestling Union disbanded, IWA Nagareyama became Union Pro Wrestling (UPW) and Sawada changed his ring name to Poison Sawada. On December 25, 1994, during the UPW Big Winter Series in Nagareyama, Chiba, Sawada faced The Mummy in a No-Rope Barbed Wire Lumberjack Venomous Mamushi Deathmatch. He was famously bitten by a real Japanese pit viper during the match, screaming "I don't want to die!", which gained him significant attention among Japanese independent wrestling fans.

After leaving UPW, he briefly returned to the Ho Death Minh persona for Nishi Nihon Pro-Wrestling, but the promotion ceased operations. Together with fellow wrestler Mitsuteru Tokuda, who was also part of Nishi Nihon, Sawada attempted to launch a new promotion called Jet's, but it was canceled due to financial issues. He then became a freelance wrestler.

=== DDT Pro-Wrestling ===
==== Debut and Jakai Tensho (1999–2002) ====
In 1999, Sawada joined Dramatic Dream Team (DDT), a promotion founded in 1997 by Sanshiro Takagi, another PWC alumnus. At first, he was portraying a wrestler who "wanted to shine once again" but was easily overpowered even by weak opponents. In early 2000, he renamed himself Poison Sawada Black. On June 29, he established the Ironman Heavymetalweight Championship, a title defended under a rule allowing anyone to challenge the champion at any place or time, provided a referee was present, inspired by the WWF Hardcore Championship (dubbed the "24/7 rule"). Sawada declared himself the inaugural champion and was then pinned seconds later by Mitsunobu Kikuzawa.

In September 2000, Sawada got possessed by a serpent god and formed the stable Jakai Tensho (蛇界転生, Jakai Tenshō; lit. "Snake Realm Reincarnation"). He changed his ring name to Poison Sawada Julie, a name inspired by actor and singer Kenji Sawada (nicknamed Julie in Japan due to his fondness for Julie Andrews), while the name Jakai Tensho was itself inspired by the 1981 film Samurai Reincarnation (魔界転生, Makai Tenshō), starring Kenji Sawada. Poison Sawada Julie became one of the main representatives of DDT's style of comedy wrestling and started recruiting wrestlers in his stable by forcing them to drink a magic snake serum. On October 11, Sawada won his first KO-D Openweight Championship by defeating Koichiro Kimura. After successfully defending the title the following day against Sanshiro Takagi, he lost it to Takagi on December 14, at Never Mind in a four-way match that also involved Tomohiko Hashimoto and Super Uchuu Power.

On April 29, 2001, Sawada entered the Take The Royal tournament, a one-day single-elimination tournament spread across two "DDT Golden Jack" free shows held in Kitazawa Town Hall. He went on to defeat Chotaro Kamoi in the first round, his Jakai Tensho stablemate Hebikage in the second round, and Sanshiro Takagi in the semifinals before falling to Mikami in the final. Between August and September, Sawada teamed with Hebikage in the 2001 KO-D Tag League, finishing in third place of the round-robin stage, ending with 11 points, then losing to the team of Takashi Sasaki and Thanomsak Toba in the third place playoff. On November 22, Nosawa was stripped of the KO-D Openweight Championship, then on November 30, at DDT My Love, Sawada faced Sanshiro Takagi and Super Uchuu Power in a three-way match for the vacant title, but ultimately fell short to Super Uchuu Power's Last Ride powerbomb. Sawada followed up his tag team win with Hebikage over the teams of Super Uchuu Power and Shigeo Kato, and Thanomsak Toba and Tomohiko Hashimoto on December 6 with a challenge to Super Uchuu Power's title, on December 12, in front of a sold out Korakuen Geopolis; Super Uchuu Power won with a front necklock in just under 17 minutes. On December 28, Sawada took part in the Fighting TV Samurai 5th Anniversary event in Korakuen Hall. He teamed with Takashi Sasaki to defeat the Suicideboyz (Mikami and Thanomsak Toba).

In 2002, after competing mostly in multi-man tag team matches, as well as some appearances in Fuyuki Army, World Entertainment Wrestling (WEW) and Japanese Women Pro-Wrestling Project (JWP), Sawada teamed with Hebikage in a losing effort against Mikami and Takashi Sasaki at NJPW's Battle Zone event at Nippon Budokan on June 7. On June 29, he became the first male wrestler to challenge for the JWP Tag Team Championship alongside Kaori Yoneyama (then named Jaori Yoneyama for the occasion) in a mixed tag team match against Command Bolshoi and Gami, but they failed to capture the title. Between July and August, Sawada teamed up with Super Uchuu Power in the 2002 KO-D Tag League, reaching the final but losing to the Suicideboyz and failing to capture the vacant KO-D Tag Team Championship. The end of 2002 saw some infighting in the Jakai Tensho stable, sparked by a rebellion led by Toguro Habukage, which culminated at Never Mind 2002 at Korakuen Hall on December 22, where Sawada defeated Hebikage, then returned him and Habukage to their human form, while accepting punishment from his snake god by being turned to stone.

==== Return and New Jakai Tensho (2003–2005) ====
On September 28, 2003, at Who's Gonna Top?, Sawada returned after a nine-month hiatus, following the conclusion of the 2003 KO-D Tag League ladder match in which Sanshiro Takagi and Yoshihiro Sakai defeated Gill Nakano and Dumbo Matsumoto by retrieving a bag containing Sawada's petrified head suspended above the ring. Sawada attacked Takagi and Sakai then disappeared again to start rebuilding his stable as New Jakai Tensho (新・蛇界転生, Shin Jakai Tenshō). He returned on October 15 and defeated Yusuke Inokuma in quick fashion before receiving a challenge by Sanshiro Takagi, who told Sawada he still considered him to be his main rival. Sawada went on to defeat Takagi at Dead Or Alive 2003 on October 26.

On February 11, 2004, at Future Port 2004 in Yokohama, Sawada took part in a No Disqualification four-way elimination double title match against KO-D Openweight Champion Shoichi Ichimiya, Ironman Heavymetalweight Champion Danshoku Dino and Sanshiro Takagi. The first fall went to Ichimiya who eliminated Takagi, then Sawada eliminated Ichimiya and Dino successively to win both their titles. Sawada lost the Ironman Heavymetalweight Championship to Inokuma shortly after on February 25, then launched a cult called Jakō Kyōdan (蛇光教団, Snake Light Organization) with Yusuke Inokuma as its first follower. He successfully defended the KO-D Openweight Championship against Mikami at Be Once In 4 Years on February 29, then against Kudo at Judgement 8 on March 20, and against Hero! on April 18. On May 29 and May 30, Sawada entered the inaugural King of DDT Tournament, defeating Seiya Morohashi in the first round, then Tomohiko Hashimoto in the second round, Danshoku Dino in the semifinals and lastly Hero! in the final to win the tournament.

Sawada made his return to professional wrestling on March 20, 2022, at Judgement 2022: DDT 25th Anniversary where he teamed up with Akarangers (Gentaro and Takashi Sasaki) and Suicideboyz (Mikami and Thanomsak Toba), being accompanied to the ring by Naomi Susan to defeat Toru Owashi, Antonio Honda, Kazuki Hirata and Yoshihiko for the KO-D 10-Man Tag Team Championship.

== Championships and accomplishments ==
- Batos Cafe Entertainment
  - Wrestle Brain Cup Championship (1 time) – with Yuija and Jaon Mizuki
- DDT Pro-Wrestling

- Ironman Heavymetalweight Championship (10 times)
- Jiyūgaoka 6-Person Tag Team Championship (2 times)
- KO-D Openweight Championship (2 times)
- KO-D 10-Man Tag Team Championship (1 time) – with Gentaro, Takashi Sasaki, Mikami and Thanomsak Toba
- King of DDT Tournament (2004)

- Pro Wrestling Crusaders

- PWC Junior Heavyweight Championship (1 time)

- IWA Kakutō Shijuku/Kokusai Promotion

- IWA World Tag Team Championship (1 time) – with Super Uchu Power

- Other titles

- CMA Heavyweight Championship (1 time)
