= Tomohiko Hashimoto =

Japanese professional wrestler (1977–2025)

- 橋本友彦
- Born: August 16, 1977; Nara, Nara, Japan
- Died: August 5, 2025 (aged 47)
- Height: 183 cm (6 ft 0 in)
- Professional wrestling career
- Ring names: Aoni Hashimoto; Freddie Krueger; Monster Freddie; Ochimusha Hashimoto; Tomohiko Hashimoto
- Billed height: 1.83 m (6 ft 0 in)
- Billed weight: 120 kg (260 lb)
- Billed from: Nara, Nara, Japan
- Trained by: Koichiro Kimura; DDT Dojo
- Debut: April 14, 2000
- Martial arts career
- Nationality: Japanese
- Height: 5 ft 11 in (1.80 m)
- Weight: 251 lb (114 kg; 17.9 st)
- Style: Wrestling, Judo
- Fighting out of: Nara, Nara, Japan
- Team: DDT Pro-Wrestling
- Teacher: Koichiro Kimura
- Rank: 3rd dan black belt in Judo
- Years active: 2002–2006

Mixed martial arts record
- Total: 5
- Wins: 1
- By knockout: 1
- Losses: 4
- By knockout: 4

Other information
- Mixed martial arts record from Sherdog

Tomohiko Hashimoto (橋本友彦, Hashimoto Tomohiko; August 16, 1977 – August 5, 2025) was a Japanese professional wrestler, judoka and mixed martial artist, best known for his time with Dramatic Dream Team (DDT), where he competed as a mainstay from 2000 to 2006. After working as a freelancer on the Japanese independent circuit for many years, mostly at Apache Pro-Wrestling Army, in 2017 he began promoting its successor promotion, Pro-Wrestling A-Team.

== Professional wrestling career ==
=== Dramatic Dream Team (2000–2006) ===
Being a former judoka, Hashimoto was trained by Koichiro Kimura for a professional wrestling career and made his wrestling debut under the ring name Tomohiko Hashimoto on April 14, 2000, by defeating Tom Burton at a JPWA event. He then joined Dramatic Dream Team (DDT) and received his further training at the DDT dojo, where he debuted at the Y2D Core event on May 28 by defeating Cannonball Kazu. Later that year, Hashimoto won the 2000 DDT Tag League with his trainer Koichiro Kimura by defeating Sanshiro Takagi and Exciting Yoshida. The following year, Hashimoto won the Two Day Tag Team Tournament with Sanshiro Takagi. At Sheep, Hashimoto won his first professional wrestling championship when he and Sanshiro Takagi defeated Gentaro and Takashi Sasaki to win the KO-D Tag Team Championship on January 31, 2003. The title was vacated after Hashimoto suffered an injury at Non-Fix 5/8 on May 8. He returned to DDT, a month later by defeating Shuji Ishikawa. He teamed with Seiya Morohashi to participate in the 2003 KO-D Tag League for the vacant KO-D Tag Team Championship, which they won by defeating Takashi Sasaki and Tanomusaku Toba in the tournament final on September 28. They lost the title to Hero! and Kudo on December 29 in a tables, ladders and chairs match also involving the team of Mikami and Onryo. Hashimoto and Morohashi participated in the 2004 KO-D Tag League where they qualified for the semi-final where they lost to Hero! and Kudo. Hashimoto won his third and final KO-D Tag Team Championship with Nobutaka Moribe by defeating Seiya Morohashi and Tanomusaku Toba at Don't Try This At Home. They successfully defended the title against Morohashi and Toba at the company's 8th Anniversary Show, before losing the title back to Morohashi and Toba in a three-way match also involving Macho Pump and Sho Kanzaki at Max Bump on May 4. At Non-Fix Saturday Night In Blue Field, Hashimoto and Muscle Sakai became the #1 contenders for the KO-D Tag Team Championship, earning their title shot against Kota Ibushi and Daichi Kakimoto at God Bless DDT, where they lost. After being a mainstay for the promotion since his debut, Hashimoto left DDT in 2006 and became a freelancer.

=== Freelance (2006–2016) ===
Hashimoto began freelancing for various independent promotions, most notably Apache Army. He also founded a booking agency Team Vader with Big Van Vader and won their Vader Cup in 2008. He won Apache Army's WEW World Tag Team Championship five times and the WEW World Heavyweight Championship once. Hashimoto also made appearances for the Frontier Martial-Arts Wrestling spin-off Cho Sento Puroresu FMW, where he teamed with W*ING Kanemura and Raijin Yaguchi to defeat Atsushi Onita, Masato Tanaka and Hideki Hosaka to win the FMW World Street Fight 6-Man Tag Team Championship on January 24, 2016. They lost the title to Onita, Hosaka and Sean Guinness on February 26.

=== A-Team and beyond (2017–2025) ===
After Apache Army closed in 2016, Hashimoto won his sixth WEW World Tag Team Championship with Masashi Takeda by defeating Tetsuhiro Kuroda and Tatsuhito Takaiwa at an A-Team show Take Off on April 16, 2017. They lost the title to Daisaku Shimoda and Blue Shark on August 11.

== Mixed martial arts career ==
During his career in DDT Pro-Wrestling, Hashimoto also competed in a few mixed martial arts fights representing the DDT promotion. He had an extremely unsuccessful career with four losses and one win via knockout.

== Death ==
Hashimoto died from cancer on August 5, 2025, at the age of 47.

== Other media ==
Hashimoto has been featured in professional wrestling video games Fire Pro Wrestling 2 and Fire Pro Wrestling Returns.

== Mixed martial arts record ==
Professional record breakdown
5 matches	1 win	4 losses
By knockout	1	4

Res.	Record	Opponent	Method	Event	Date	Round	Time	Location	Notes
Win	1–4	Jairo Kusunoki	KO (punches)	W-Capsule - Vol. 2	June 11, 2006	1	0:33	Tokyo, Japan	
Loss	0–4	Alan Karaev	TKO (punches)	GCM: D.O.G. 3	September 17, 2005	1	0:27	Tokyo, Japan	
Loss	0–3	Alistair Overeem	TKO (knees)	Inoki Bom-Ba-Ye 2003	December 31, 2003	1	0:36	Kobe, Japan	
Loss	0–2	Takayuki Okada	KO (punch)	Pride FC: The Best, Vol. 2	July 20, 2002	1	2:10	Tokyo, Japan	
Loss	0–1	Kengo Watanabe	TKO (punches)	Pancrase: Spirit 4	May 11, 2002	1	4:17	Osaka, Japan	

== Championships and accomplishments ==
- Apache Pro-Wrestling Army/Pro Wrestling A-Team

- WEW World Heavyweight Championship (3 times)
- WEW World Tag Team Championship (10 times) – with Kengo Nishimura (1), Shoichi Ichimiya (1), Tadasuke (1), Kazushi Miyamoto (1), Keisuke Okuda (1), Masashi Takeda (1), Nobutaka Moribe (1), Gajo (2), and Super Tiger II (1)

- Cho Sento Puroresu FMW

- FMW World Street Fight 6-Man Tag Team Championship (1 time) – with W*ING Kanemura and Raijin Yaguchi

- Daiwa Entertainment Pro-Wrestling

- DEP Open-weight Championship (1 time)

- Dramatic Dream Team

- KO-D Tag Team Championship (3 times) – with Sanshiro Takagi (1), Seiya Morohashi (1) and Nobutaka Moribe (1)
- DDT Tag League (2000) – with Koichiro Kimura
- KO-D Tag League (2003) – with Seiya Morohashi
- Two Day Tag Team Tournament – with Sanshiro Takagi (2001)

- Pro Wrestling Zero1

- NWA Intercontinental Tag Team Championship (1 time) – with Gajo

- Team Vader

- Vader Cup (2008)
