= Seiya Morohashi =

Japanese professional wrestler

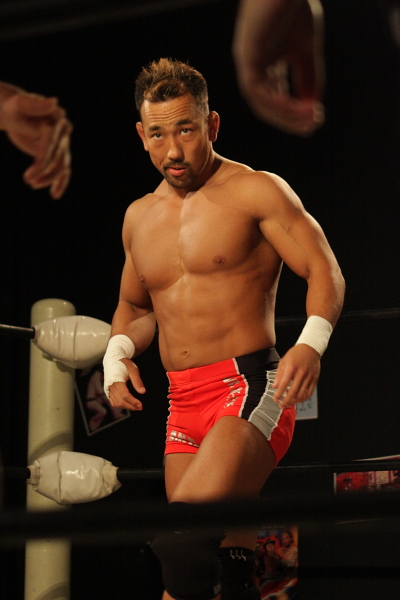
- Morohashi in June 2010

Personal information
- Born: August 24, 1977 (age 49) Chiba, Japan

Professional wrestling career
- Ring name(s): Haruya Morohashi; Big Morohashi; Daisuke Kiso; Seiya Morohashi
- Billed height: 1.71 m (5 ft 7 in)
- Billed weight: 85 kg (187 lb)
- Debut: 1997

Seiya Morohashi (諸橋晴也, Morohashi Seiya) is a Japanese professional wrestler, currently working for Japanese professional wrestling promotion Pro Wrestling Noah.

== Professional wrestling career ==
=== Independent circuit (1997–present) ===
Morohashi made his professional wrestling debut in International Wrestling Association of Japan, at IWA Japan Future Trial Tour '97 on May 17, 1997, where he unsuccessfully challenged Hidetomo Egawa. He participated in intergender matches, such as the Mio Shirai Produce Tonight Is The Night, an event produced by Mio Shirai and promoted by Oz Academy on March 2, 2014; he was on a team with Gota Ihashi and lost to a team of Tsubasa Kuragaki and Aja Kong. Morohashi fought one match for New Japan Pro-Wrestling at NJPW Lion's Road on November 8, 2004, where he teamed up with Kota Ibushi and defeat Hero! and Kudo.

==== Dramatic Dream Team (2002–2019) ====
Morohashi had a long tenure at Dramatic Dream Team, a promotion for which he made his debut at DDT Non-Fix 5/23, on May 23, 2002, where he defeated against Hero!. An early appearance he made for DDT was at Judgement 2008 from March 9, where he teamed up with Daisuke Sasaki to defeat Yukihiro Abe and Rion Mizuki through submission. Later that night, he teamed up with Koo and Toru Owashi to score a victory over Kota Ibushi, Daichi Kakimoto and Antonio Honda in a six-man tag team match. On March 27, at Judgement 2011, he entered first in a rumble match for the right to challenge for the KO-D Openweight Championship, but lost to Shuji Ishikawa. At Ryōgoku Peter Pan 2013 on August 18, he participated in an Ironman Heavymetalweight Championship battle with Michael Nakazawa, Gorgeous Matsuno and Kyohei Mikami. At DDT New Year Lottery Special 2016, Morohashi participated in a 10-man New Year Kakizome rumble match, where he faced popular superstars, like Antonio Honda, Yuko Miyamoto and Kazusada Higuchi.

=== Pro Wrestling Noah (2017–2020) ===
Morohashi debuted in Pro Wrestling Noah in the NOAH Global Tag League 2017 on May 3, where he lost to Tadasuke. On June 13, 2017, he teamed up with Phil Atlas to participate in the Global Junior Heavyweight Tag League, competing against teams such as Hi69 and Taiji Ishimori, and Mao and Shunma Katsumata; he finished with eight points. He participated in the same competition a year later with Junta Miyawaki, and competing against teams of Ikuto Hidaka and Takuya Sugawara, and Ricky Marvin and El Hijo del Pantera, though he did not score any points. In the 2019 Tag League, Morohashi competed with the same teammate against teams such as Chris Ridgeway and Hitoshi Kumano, Hajime Ohara and Nosawa Rongai, finishing with four points. He participated in the 2018 Global Junior Heavyweight League, where he competed against Kotaro Suzuki, Daisuke Harada, Hitoshi Kumano, Tadasuke and Hajime Ohara, placing in block B of the tournament and finishing with two points. He was in a rank 1 contendership tournament, beginning at NOAH All Four Sides on June 19, 2020, for the GHC National Championship, losing in a first-round match to Shuhei Taniguchi.

== Championships and accomplishments ==
- Best Body Japan Pro-Wrestling

- BBW Tag Team Championship (1 time) – with Hiroshi Yamato

- Dramatic Dream Team/DDT Pro-Wrestling

- Ironman Heavymetalweight Championship (6 times)
- King of Dark Championship (2 times)
- KO-D Tag Team Championship (5 times) – with Shoichi Ichimiya (1), Tomohiko Hashimoto (1), Tanomusaku Toba (2) and Poco Takanashi (1)
- KO-D Tag League (2003) – with Tomohiko Hashimoto

- Union Pro-Wrestling
  - World Aipoke Championship (1 time)
