= Gorgeous Matsuno =

Japanese professional wrestler

Personal information
- Born: April 18, 1961 (age 65) Fukushima, Japan

Professional wrestling career
- Ring name(s): Matsuno Collection A.T. Mecha Matsuno; Gorgeous Matsuno
- Billed height: 5 ft 11 in (180 cm)
- Billed weight: 165 lb (75 kg)
- Trained by: DDT Dojo
- Debut: 2002

Yukihide Matsuno (松野行秀, Matsuno Yukihide), better known by his ring name Gorgeous Matsuno (ゴージャス松野, Gōjasu Matsuno), is a Japanese professional wrestler who works for the wrestling promotion DDT Pro-Wrestling (DDT).

== Professional wrestling career ==
=== Independent circuit (2001–present) ===
Matsuno made his professional wrestling debut in 2001 at the age of 39. His first documented match took place on October 10, 2002 at the 8th Anniversary show of the International Wrestling Association of Japan, where he competed alongside Yuji Kito and Tiger Jeet Singh in a six-man tag team match against Tatsukuni Asano, Ryo Miyake, and The Great Kabuki.

Over the following decade, Matsuno worked for several Japanese wrestling promotions, including Dragon Gate. Ten years after his initial debut, he appeared at the Dragon Gate/DDT Dramatic Dream Gate Returns crossover event on May 6, 2012, teaming with Rich Swann and Ryo Jimmy Saito in a losing effort against Don Fujii, Antonio Honda, and Danshoku Dino. Nearly twenty years into his career, Matsuno competed alongside Jinsei Shinzaki in Michinoku Pro Wrestling's 2019 Futaritabi Tag Tournament. The pair reached the semi-finals before losing to Tsutomu Oosugi and Tatsuhito Senga on October 14, 2019.

Matsuno is known for his comedic wrestling, and has often performed an exaggerated "old-man" gimmick for comedic effect.

=== Dramatic Dream Team (2003–present) ===
At DDT 8th Anniversary: Judgement 9 on March 27, 2005, Matsuno teamed up with Danshoku Dino and Muscle Sakai to defeat Akeomi Nitta, Shuji Ishikawa and Jun Inomata in a six-man tag team match. Matsuno is a former O-40 Champion; he first won the title at Who's Gonna Top? 2019 on September 29 after defeating Sanshiro Takagi. After a 406-day title reign, he lost the championship to Toru Owashi on November 8, 2020 at DDT TV Show! #11. On November 30, 2014 Matsuno won the KO-D 6-Man Tag Team Championship alongside The Brahman Brothers (Brahman Kei and Brahman Shu) at God Bless DDT after defeating T2Hii (Kazuki Hirata, Sanshiro Takagi and Toru Owashi).

Matsuno is also a former multiple-time Ironman Heavymetalweight Champion in the CyberFight wrestling promotion. On March 30, 2020 he competed in a falls count anywhere, four-way tag team match to promote awareness of COVID-19 among elderly people; he teamed up with Gabai Ji-chan to defeat Konosuke Takeshita and Shunma Katsumata, Chris Brookes and Mike Bailey, and Shinya Aoki and Makoto Oishi. He has also worked several singles matches as a solo wrestler, including a singles bout on November 14, 2020 at DDT TV Show! #12 where he lost to Danshoku Dino.

== Personal life ==
On November 3, 2008, Matsuno collapsed in the restroom of a bar in Fukushima and was found unconscious by his partner, enka singer Junko Tashiro. Matsuno was rushed to a nearby hospital, where it was determined that he had suffered an episode of cardiac arrest. He was subsequently diagnosed with acute liver failure, caused by a combination of alcohol and anti-depressant medication. Matsuno was given CPR and a tracheotomy in order to save his life, and was able to eventually make a full recovery and return to professional wrestling three years later at DDT's Max Bump event in Korakuen Hall.

Matsuno was a collateral victim of the 2011 Tōhoku earthquake; he stated that his home was briefly affected by the natural disaster. He has been clinically diagnosed with depression.

== Championships and accomplishments ==
- Dramatic Dream Team/DDT Pro Wrestling
  - KO-D 6-Man Tag Team Championship (1 time) - with Brahman Kei and Brahman Shu
  - O-40 Championship (1 time)
  - Ironman Heavymetalweight Championship (18 times)
- Best Body Japan Pro Wrestling

- BBW Tag Team Championship (2 time) – with Kazuhiko Yoshida (1) and Tetsuya Endo (1)
