= List of major DDT Pro-Wrestling events =

List of major events produced by DDT Pro-Wrestling

This is a list of major DDT events, chronicling all notable professional wrestling cards promoted by DDT Pro-Wrestling, later broadcast on Fighting TV Samurai or streamed on Wrestle Universe.

== Annual tournaments ==
=== Active ===
Tournament	Latest winner(s)	Date won	Notes
King of DDT Tournament	Shinya Aoki	May 31, 2026	Single-elimination tournament with a head-to-head final match.
D Generations Cup	Kazuma Sumi	February 22, 2026	Round-robin tournament with a head-to-head final match.

=== Former ===
Tournament	Latest winner(s)	Date won	Notes
D-Oh Grand Prix	Yukio Naya	January 3, 2024	Round-robin tournament with a head-to-head final match.
Ultimate Tag League	Disaster Box (Harashima and Naomi Yoshimura)	February 27, 2022	Tag team tournament held in a round-robin format.
Young Drama Cup	Soma Takao	November 28, 2010	Round-robin tournament held to promote their younger talents.

== Past events ==
=== 1990s ===
==== 1997 ====
Date	Event	Venue	Location	Final match	Notes	Ref.
March 25	Judgement	Hibiya Radio City	Tokyo, Japan	Super Uchuu Power and Kamen Shooter Super Rider vs. Sanshiro Takagi and Kazushige Nosawa	Pre-launch event	

==== 1998 ====
Date	Event	Venue	Location	Final match	Ref.
March 25	Judgement 2	Kitazawa Town Hall	Tokyo, Japan	Sanshiro Takagi, Kazushige Nosawa and Koichiro Kimura vs. Masao Orihara, ZIP and Hidetomo Egawa	

==== 1999 ====
Date	Event	Venue	Location	Final match	Notes	Ref.
March 20	Judgement 3	Itabashi Green Hall	Tokyo, Japan	Super Uchuu Power, Phantom Funakashi and Tsunehito Naito vs. Sanshiro Takagi, Exciting Yoshida and Kamen Shooter Super Rider		
December 22	Ichi ka Bachi ka	Korakuen Hall	Tokyo, Japan	Sanshiro Takagi vs. Masao Orihara	First event held at the Korakuen Hall	

=== 2000s ===
==== 2000 ====
Date	Event	Venue	Location	Final match	Ref.
March 30	Judgement 4	Kitazawa Town Hall	Tokyo, Japan	Sanshiro Takagi, Mitsunobu Kikuzawa and Exciting Yoshida vs. Masao Orihara, Poison Sawada Black and Masahiko Orihara	
December 14	Never Mind	Korakuen Geopolis	Tokyo, Japan	Poison Sawada Julie (c) vs. Super Uchuu Power vs. Tomohiko Hashimoto vs. Sanshiro Takagi in a four-way elimination match for the KO-D Openweight Championship	

==== 2001 ====
Date	Event	Venue	Location	Final match	Ref.
January 16	Document D.D.T.	Kitazawa Town Hall	Tokyo, Japan	25-person Royal Rumble	
March 28	Judgement 5	Kitazawa Town Hall	Tokyo, Japan	Sanshiro Takagi (c) vs. Exciting Yoshida for the KO-D Openweight Championship	
May 18	Max Bump	Korakuen Geopolis	Tokyo, Japan	Sanshiro Takagi, Mikami and Tachihikari vs. Super Uchuu Power, Exciting Yoshida and Kintaro Kanemura in a HIT match	
June 29	No Reason, No Future	Korakuen Geopolis	Tokyo, Japan	Mikami vs. Takashi Sasaki	
October 30	Dead or Alive	Korakuen Geopolis	Tokyo, Japan	Super Uchuu Power, Mikami, Thanomsak Toba and Tomohiko Hashimoto vs. X-RAB (Sanshiro Takagi, Tomohiro Ishii, Gentaro and Yoshiya) in a 4-on-4 elimination tag team match	
November 30	DDT My Love	Kitazawa Town Hall	Tokyo, Japan	Sanshiro Takagi vs. Super Uchuu Power vs. Poison Sawada Julie in a three-way match for the vacant KO-D Openweight Championship	
December 8	DDT Wrestling Tonkotsu	Fukuoka Dome	Fukuoka, Japan	Poison Sawada Julie and Takashi Sasaki vs. Suicideboyz (Mikami and Thanomsak Toba) in the first round of the 2 Day Tag Tournament	
December 9	DDT Wrestling Tonkotsu	Fukuoka Dome	Fukuoka, Japan	Sanshiro Takagi and Tomohiko Hashimoto vs. Poison Sawada Julie and Takashi Sasaki in the final of the 2 Day Tag Tournament	
December 12	Never Mind 2001	Korakuen Geopolis	Tokyo, Japan	Sanshiro Takagi vs. Sanshiro Takagi in a Loser Forfeits His Ring Name lumberjack match	

==== 2002 ====
Date	Event	Venue	Location	Final match	Ref.
January 26	Dark Horse 2002	Kitazawa Town Hall	Tokyo, Japan	Super Uchuu Power (c, Openweight) and Asian Cooger (c, Ironman) vs. Mikami and Takashi Sasaki (c, Tag) for the KO-D Openweight, KO-D Tag Team and Ironman Heavymetalweight Championships	
March 25	Judgement 6	Club Atom	Tokyo, Japan	Super Uchuu Power and Kintaro Kanemura vs. Sanshiro Takagi and Poison Sawada Julie	
May 3	Turning Point	Korakuen Hall	Tokyo, Japan	Super Uchuu Power (c, Openweight) vs. Sanshiro Takagi (c, Ironman) for the KO-D Openweight Championship and the Ironman Heavymetalweight Championship	
May 31	Max Bump 2002	Korakuen Geopolis	Tokyo, Japan	Sanshiro Takagi (c) vs. Kintaro Kanemura for the KO-D Openweight Championship	
June 28	Get Alive!	Korakuen Geopolis	Tokyo, Japan	Takashi Sasaki vs. Poison Sawada Julie	
September 20	Royal Rumble	Korakuen Geopolis	Tokyo, Japan	19-man Royal Rumble for the KO-D Openweight Championship	
October 24	Dead or Alive	Korakuen Geopolis	Tokyo, Japan	Suicideboyz (Mikami and Thanomsak Toba) (c, KO-D) vs. Akarengers (Takashi Sasaki and Gentaro) (c, WEW) for the CMLL KO-D Tag Team Championship and the WEW Tag Team Championship	
November 29	God Bless DDT	Korakuen Geopolis	Tokyo, Japan	Sanshiro Takagi (c) vs. Gentaro for the KO-D Openweight Championship	
December 22	Never Mind 2002	Korakuen Hall	Tokyo, Japan	Gentaro (c) vs. Mikami vs. Sanshiro Takagi vs. Tomohiko Hashimoto in a four-way elimination match for the KO-D Openweight Championship	

==== 2003 ====
Date	Event	Venue	Location	Final match	Ref.
January 4	The First Dream 2003	Studio Dream Maker	Tokyo, Japan	Akarengers (Takashi Sasaki and Gentaro) (c) vs. Sanshiro Takagi and Tomohiko Hashimoto	
January 31	Sheep 2003	Korakuen Hall	Tokyo, Japan	12-person New Year Fukubukuro Royal Rumble-Style Battle Royal	
February 28	Break Through DDT	Korakuen Geopolis	Tokyo, Japan	Gentaro vs. Takashi Sasaki	
March 15	Judgement 7	Korakuen Geopolis	Tokyo, Japan	Sanshiro Takagi vs. Takashi Sasaki	
April 5	Golden Jack 2003	Battle Sphere Tokyo	Tokyo, Japan	Takashi Sasaki and Shoichi Ichimiya vs. Gentaro and Tomohiko Hashimoto in a street fight tornado tag team match	
May 4	D-Day	Korakuen Hall	Tokyo, Japan	Takashi Sasaki, Mikami, Super Uchuu Power and Kudo vs. Strawberry Jam (Sanshiro Takagi, Gentaro, Shoichi Ichimiya, Tomohiko Hashimoto, Kurokage and Futoshi-kage) in a 6-on-4 Royal Rumble elimination match	
May 18	Max Bump 2003	Studio Dream Maker	Tokyo, Japan	Super Uchuu Power and Takashi Sasaki vs. Kurt Angile and Seiya Morohashi in the final of the KO-D One Night Tag Tournament for the vacant CMLL KO-D Tag Team Championship	
June 15	Future Port 2003	Yokohama Red Brick Warehouse	Yokohama, Japan	Team Karamawari (Takashi Sasaki and Thanomsak Toba) (c) vs. Mikami and Kudo for the CMLL KO-D Tag Team Championship	
July 17	Audience 2003	Korakuen Hall	Tokyo, Japan	Mikami (c) vs. Takashi Sasaki for the KO-D Openweight Championship	
July 20	Yoshihiro Sakai I Shall Return	Niigata Phase	Niigata, Japan	Team Midbreath (Mr. Strawberry, Yoshihiro Sakai and O.K.Revolution) vs. Super Uchuu Power, Tomohiko Hashimoto and Shuji Ishikawa in the final of the Sea of Japan Cup for the inaugural Sea of Japan 6-Person Tag Team Championship	
September 28	Who's Gonna Top?	Korakuen Hall	Tokyo, Japan	Takashi Sasaki and Thanomsak Toba vs. Tomohiko Hashimoto and Seiya Morohashi in the final of the 4th KO-D Tag League for the vacant KO-D Tag Team Championship	
October 26	Dead or Alive 2003	Studio Dream Maker	Tokyo, Japan	Takashi Sasaki (c) vs. Shoichi Ichimiya in a chain deathmatch for the KO-D Openweight Championship	
November 23	Golden Killer 2003 in Nagoya	Naka Sports Center	Nagoya, Japan	Sanshiro Takagi, Thanomsak Toba and Yoshihiro Sakai vs. New Jakai Tensho (Poison Sawada Julie, Takashi and Yusuke Inokuma)	
November 30	God Bless DDT 2003 in Osaka	IMP Hall	Osaka, Japan	Tomohiko Hashimoto and Seiya Morohashi (c) vs. Mikami and Onryo vs. Kudo and Hero! in a three-way elimination match for the CMLL KO-D Tag Team Championship	
December 29	Never Mind 2003	Korakuen Hall	Tokyo, Japan	Tomohiko Hashimoto and Seiya Morohashi (c) vs. Mikami and Onryo vs. Hero! and Kudo in a three-way TLC tornado tag team match for the CMLL KO-D Tag Team Championship	

==== 2004 ====
Date	Event	Venue	Location	Final match	Ref.
January 12	Hatsuyume 2004	Korakuen Hall	Tokyo, Japan	15-person New Year Otoshidama Royal Rumble	
February 11	Future Port 2004	Yokohama Red Brick Warehouse	Yokohama, Japan	Hero! and Kudo (c) vs. Akarengers (Takashi Sasaki and Gentaro) for the CMLL KO-D Tag Team Championship	
February 29	Be Once in 4 Years	Delfin Arena	Osaka, Japan	Akarengers (Takashi Sasaki and Gentaro) (c) vs. Hero! and Kudo for the CMLL KO-D Tag Team Championship	
March 20	Judgement 8	Velfarre	Tokyo, Japan	Akarengers (Takashi Sasaki and Gentaro) (c) vs. Suicideboyz (Mikami and Thanomsak Toba) for the KO-D Tag Team Championship	
April 15	Tokyo Crazy Night in Hokkaido	Hakodate Kanamori Hall	Hakodate, Japan	Akarengers (Takashi Sasaki and Gentaro) and Koichiro Kimura vs. Suicideboyz (Mikami and Thanomsak Toba) and Tomohiko Hashimoto	
April 16	Tokyo Crazy Night in Hokkaido	Kitami East Training Center	Kitami, Japan	Sanshiro Takagi, Hero! and Erika Watanabe vs. Shoichi Ichimiya, Futoshi Miwa and Etsuko Mita	
April 17	Tokyo Crazy Night in Hokkaido	Sports Café Yell	Sapporo, Japan	Sanshiro Takagi and Hero! vs. Danshoku Dino and Futoshi Miwa	
April 18	Tokyo Crazy Night in Hokkaido	Sapporo Teisen Hall	Sapporo, Japan	Sanshiro Takagi and Shoichi Ichimiya vs. Kensuke Sasaki and Kenshin	
May 3	Max Bump 2004	Korakuen Hall	Tokyo, Japan	Suicideboyz (Mikami and Thanomsak Toba), Hero! and Kudo vs. Akarengers (Takashi Sasaki and Gentaro), Yusuke Inokuma and Shinrei Chiryō no Sensei in a Royal Rumble Elimination match	
June 27	Road to Nagoya-jo	Naka Sports Center	Nagoya, Japan	Jako Gundan (Poison Sawada Julie, Takashi Sasaki, Gentaro and Gorgeous Matsuno) vs. DDT Superstars (Sanshiro Takagi, Shoichi Ichimiya, Mikami and Hero!) in a 4-on-4 Elimination Rumble	
July 1	Audience 2004	Korakuen Hall	Tokyo, Japan	Akarengers (Takashi Sasaki and Gentaro) (c) vs. Sanshiro Takagi and Ryuji Ito for the KO-D Tag Team Championship	
July 31	Boys Be Ambitious 2004	Korakuen Hall	Tokyo, Japan	Sanshiro Takagi and Ryuji Ito (c) vs. Akarengers (Takashi Sasaki and Gentaro) vs. Gay Machine Guns (Danshoku Dino and Glenn "Q" Spectre) for the KO-D Tag Team Championship	
September 30	Who's Gonna Top? 2004	Korakuen Hall	Tokyo, Japan	Gay Machine Guns (Danshoku Dino and Glenn "Q" Spectre) vs. Hero! and Kudo in the final of the 5th KO-D Tag League, for the KO-D Tag Team Championship	
November 2	Day Dream Believer 2004	Korakuen Hall	Tokyo, Japan	Poison Sawada Julie (c) vs. Mikami for the KO-D Openweight Championship	
November 28	God Bless DDT 2004	IMP Hall	Osaka, Japan	Sanshiro Takagi, Mikami, Riki Sensyu and Daichi Kakimoto vs. Far East Connection (Dick Togo, Tomohiko Hashimoto, Yoshiya and Sho Kanzaki)	
December 12	Dragon Ketta 2004	Naka Sports Center	Nagoya, Japan	Sanshiro Takagi, Shoichi Ichimiya and Kota Ibushi vs. Hero!, Kudo and Futoshi Miwa	
December 25	Never Mind 2004	Korakuen Hall	Tokyo, Japan	DDT (Sanshiro Takagi, Mikami, Ryuji Ito, Riki Senshu and Daichi Kakimoto) vs. FEC (Dick Togo, Taka Michinoku, Tomohiko Hashimoto, Yoshiya and Sho Kanzaki) in a five-on-five elimination rumble	

==== 2005 ====
Date	Event	Venue	Location	Final match	Ref.
January 4	Hatsuyume: 2005	Shin-Kiba 1st Ring	Tokyo, Japan	17-person New Year Tradition! Counterfeit Royal Rumble	
January 30	Into The Fight 2005	Korakuen Hall	Tokyo, Japan	Mikami (c) vs. Dick Togo for the KO-D Openweight Championship	
February 25	Don't Try This at Home 2005	Korakuen Hall	Tokyo, Japan	Dick Togo (c) vs. Sanshiro Takagi for the KO-D Openweight Championship	
March 27	DDT 8th Anniversary: Judgement 9	Shinjuku Club Heights	Tokyo, Japan	Far East Connection (Tomohiko Hashimoto and Nobutaka Moribe) (c) vs. Seiya Morohashi and Thanomsak Toba for the KO-D Tag Team Championship	
May 3	Max Bump 2005	Korakuen Hall	Tokyo, Japan	Dick Togo (c) vs. Sanshiro Takagi in a No Rules match for the KO-D Openweight Championship	
June 29	Audience 2005	Korakuen Hall	Tokyo, Japan	Sanshiro Takagi (c) vs. Kudo for the KO-D Openweight Championship	
August 7	Dramatic Dragons 2005	Naka Sports Center	Nagoya, Japan	Poison Sawada, Jun Inomata and Ultraman Robin vs. Shoichi Ichimiya, Muscle Sakai and Futoshi Miwa	
August 28	Dramatic Style	Korakuen Hall	Tokyo, Japan	Sanshiro Takagi, Danshoku Dino, Poison Sawada and Jun Inomata vs. Dick Togo, Rey Cubano, Gran Maestro and Antonio Honda in a Cuban Deathmatch	
September 23	Who's Gonna Top? 2005 in Osaka	IMP Hall	Osaka, Japan	Danshoku Dino and Glenn "Q" Spectre vs. Daichi Kakimoto and Kota Ibushi in the final of the 6th KO-D Tag League	
October 27	Day Dream Believer 2005	Korakuen Hall	Tokyo, Japan	Sanshiro Takagi (c) vs. Danshoku Dino for the KO-D Openweight Championship	
November 27	God Bless DDT 2005 in Nagoya	Nakamura Sports Center	Nagoya, Japan	Danshoku Dino and Men's Teioh vs. Shacho-ha (Riki Sensyu and Super Uchuu Power)	
December 28	Never Mind 2005	Korakuen Hall	Tokyo, Japan	Danshoku Dino (c) vs. Sanshiro Takagi vs. Super Uchuu Power vs. Francesco Togo vs. Toru Owashi in a five-way ladder match for the KO-D Openweight Championship	

==== 2006 ====
Date	Event	Venue	Location	Final match	Ref.
January 29	Hatsuyume 2006	Korakuen Hall	Tokyo, Japan	Ikuto Hidaka, Minoru Fujita and Mikami vs. Daichi Kakimoto, Kota Ibushi and Seiya Morohashi	
March 5	Judgement 10	Shinjuku Face	Tokyo, Japan	Daichi Kakimoto and Kota Ibushi (c) vs. Italian Four Horsemen (Francesco Togo and Mori Bernard) for the CMLL KO-D Tag Team Championship	
April 2	After Aprilfool 2006	Korakuen Hall	Tokyo, Japan	Danshoku Dino (c) vs. Toru Owashi for the KO-D Openweight Championship	
May 4	Max Bump 2006	Korakuen Hall	Tokyo, Japan	Danshoku Dino and Milano Collection A. T. vs. Disaster Box (Toru Owashi and Harashima)	
June 4	Audience 2006	Korakuen Hall	Tokyo, Japan	Sanshiro Takagi and Poison Sawada Julie vs. Tatsutoshi Goto and Mitsuya "Who?" Nagai in a no disqualification match	
June 25	King of DDT 2006	Shinjuku Face	Tokyo, Japan	Toru Owashi (c) vs. Poison Sawada Julie for the KO-D Openweight Championship	
July 9	Dramatic Dragons 2006	Nakamura Sports Center	Nagoya, Japan	Disaster Box (Toru Owashi and Harashima) vs. Poison Sawada Julie and Kudo	
July 23	Summer Vacation 2006	Korakuen Hall	Tokyo, Japan	Disaster Box (Toru Owashi, Harashima, Danshoku Dino and "Jet" Shogo) vs. DDT Jakai Hontai (Kudo, Poison Sawada Julie, Sanshiro Dokumamushi and Mitsuya Jagai) in a 4-on-4 gauntlet match	
August 27	Dramatic Style 2006	Korakuen Hall	Tokyo, Japan	Toru Owashi (c) vs. Kudo for the KO-D Openweight Championship	
September 17	Sanshiro Festival	Toyonaka Rose Cultural Hall	Toyonaka, Japan	Sanshiro Takagi vs. Kota Ibushi	
October 22	Day Dream Believer 2006	Korakuen Hall	Tokyo, Japan	Mitsuya Jagai, Toru Owashi and Harashima vs. Team 2 Southern Island (Sanshiro Takagi, Kudo and Yoshiaki Yago)	
November 23	God Bless DDT 2006	Shinjuku Face	Tokyo, Japan	Harashima vs. Kudo to determine the No. 1 contender for the KO-D Openweight Championship	
December 29	Never Mind 2006	Korakuen Hall	Tokyo, Japan	Toru Owashi (c) vs. Harashima for the KO-D Openweight Championship	

==== 2007 ====
Date	Event	Venue	Location	Final match	Notes	Ref.
January 28	Dramatic Rumble 2007	Korakuen Hall	Tokyo, Japan	Harashima (c) vs. Daichi Kakimoto for the KO-D Openweight Championship		
February 25	Into The Fight 2007	Korakuen Hall	Tokyo, Japan	Harashima (c) vs. Danshoku Dino for the KO-D Openweight Championship		
March 11	10th Anniversary: Judgement 2007	Kitazawa Town Hall	Tokyo, Japan	Harashima, Seiya Morohashi and Kota Ibushi vs. Sanshiro Takagi, Kudo and Thanomsak Toba		
March 11	Judgement 10th Anniversary Special	Kitazawa Town Hall	Tokyo, Japan	Sanshiro Takagi and Mikami vs. Masao Orihara and Nosawa Rongai		
April 1	Aprilfool 2007	Korakuen Hall	Tokyo, Japan	Harashima (c) vs. Sanshiro Takagi for the KO-D Openweight Championship		
April 18	DDG: Dramatic Dream Gate	Shinjuku Face	Tokyo, Japan	Typhoon (Susumu Yokosuka, Ryo Saito and Matt Sydal) vs. Harashima, Mikami and Kudo	Co-produced with Dragon Gate.	
May 4	Max Bump 2007	Korakuen Hall	Tokyo, Japan	Harashima, Kudo and Kota Ibushi vs. Aloha World Order (Prince Togo, Koo and Antonio "The Dragon" Honda)		
May 12	Ōmori Dream Fair 2007	Ōmori Station Plaza	Tokyo, Japan	Harashima, Kudo and Kota Ibushi vs. Seiya Morohashi, Masa Takanashi and Daichi Kakimoto		
June 3	King of DDT 2007	Korakuen Hall	Tokyo, Japan	Harashima (c) vs. Koo for the KO-D Openweight Championship		
July 1	Audience 2007	Korakuen Hall	Tokyo, Japan	Koo (c) vs. Kudo for the KO-D Openweight Championship		
July 9	Monday Night Wow	Shin-Kiba 1st Ring	Tokyo, Japan	Harashima vs. Yoshiaki Yago in the KO-D Openweight Championship Contendership League		
August 5	Dramatic Style 2007	Korakuen Hall	Tokyo, Japan	Koo (c) vs. Harashima vs. Danshoku Dino vs. Seiya Morohashi in an elimination four-way match for the KO-D Openweight Championship		
August 18	Sanshiro Festival 2007	Toyonaka Rose Cultural Hall	Toyonaka, Japan	Sanshiro Takagi vs. Muscle Sakai in a Weapon Rumble		
August 26	Urabangumi o Buttobase! 2007	Differ Ariake	Tokyo, Japan	Takashi Sasaki, Harashima and Seiya Morohashi vs. Aloha World Order (Koo, Prince Togo and Antonio "The Dragon" Honda)		
September 23	Who's Gonna Top? 2007	Korakuen Hall	Tokyo, Japan	Harashima vs. Seiya Morohashi in the tiebreaker of a best of four series to determine the No. 1 contender for the KO-D Openweight Championship		
October 21	Day Dream Believer 2007	Korakuen Hall	Tokyo, Japan	Koo (c) vs. Harashima for the KO-D Openweight Championship		
November 27	God Bless DDT 2007	Korakuen Hall	Tokyo, Japan	Harashima (c) vs. Mikami for the KO-D Openweight Championship		
December 9	Phase Final!!	Niigata Phase	Niigata, Japan	Mitsuharu Misawa and Kotaro Suzuki vs. Sanshiro Takagi and Muscle Sakai		
December 30	Never Mind 2007	Korakuen Hall	Tokyo, Japan	Harashima vs. Kota Ibushi		

==== 2008 ====
Date	Event	Venue	Location	Final match	Ref.
February 3	Into The Fight 2008	Korakuen Hall	Tokyo, Japan	Royal Rumble to determine the No. 1 contender for the KO-D Openweight Championship	
March 9	Judgement 2008	Korakuen Hall	Tokyo, Japan	Harashima (c) vs. Yasu Urano for the KO-D Openweight Championship	
May 6	Max Bump 2008	Korakuen Hall	Tokyo, Japan	Harashima (c) vs. Sanshiro Takagi vs. Yoshiaki Yago vs. Dick Togo vs. Seiya Morohashi in a five-way elimination match for the KO-D Openweight Championship	
November 30	God Bless DDT 2008	Korakuen Hall	Tokyo, Japan	Disaster Box (Toru Owashi and Harashima) (c) vs. Sanshiro Takagi and Shuji Ishikawa for the CMLL KO-D Tag Team Championship	
December 28	Never Mind 2008	Korakuen Hall	Tokyo, Japan	Sanshiro Takagi (c) vs. Harashima for the KO-D Openweight Championship	

==== 2009 ====
Date	Event	Venue	Location	Final match	Notes	Ref.
February 22	Into The Fight 2009	Korakuen Hall	Tokyo, Japan	Sanshiro Takagi (c) vs. Kota Ibushi for the KO-D Openweight Championship		
April 5	Judgement 2009	Korakuen Hall	Tokyo, Japan	17-man KO-D Openweight Championship Conterdership Double Chance Battle Royal		
May 4	Max Bump 2009	Korakuen Hall	Tokyo, Japan	Sanshiro Takagi (c) vs. Harashima for the KO-D Openweight Championship		
August 23	Ryōgoku Peter Pan	Ryōgoku Kokugikan	Tokyo, Japan	Harashima (c) vs. Kota Ibushi for the KO-D Openweight Championship	First event held at the Ryōgoku Kokugikan	
November 15	God Bless DDT 2009	Shinjuku Face	Tokyo, Japan	Kudo and Yasu Urano (c) vs. Belt Hunter × Hunter (Danshoku Dino and Keisuke Ishii) for the CMLL KO-D Tag Team Championship		
December 27	Never Mind 2009	Korakuen Hall	Tokyo, Japan	Shuji Ishikawa (c) vs. Harashima for the KO-D Openweight Championship		

=== 2010s ===
==== 2010 ====
Date	Event	Venue	Location	Final match	Ref.
February 11	Into the Fight 2010	Korakuen Hall	Tokyo, Japan	Shuji Ishikawa (c) vs. Danshoku Dino for the KO-D Openweight Championship	
March 14	Judgement 2010	Korakuen Hall	Tokyo, Japan	Daisuke Sekimoto (c) vs. Sanshiro Takagi for the KO-D Openweight Championship	
May 4	Max Bump 2010	Korakuen Hall	Tokyo, Japan	Daisuke Sekimoto (c) vs. Kota Ibushi for the KO-D Openweight Championship	
July 25	Ryōgoku Peter Pan 2010	Ryōgoku Kokugikan	Tokyo, Japan	Daisuke Sekimoto (c) vs. Harashima for the KO-D Openweight Championship	
November 28	God Bless DDT 2010	Korakuen Hall	Tokyo, Japan	Hikaru Sato (c) vs. Dick Togo for the KO-D Openweight Championship	
December 26	Never Mind 2010	Korakuen Hall	Tokyo, Japan	Gentaro vs. Antonio Honda for the interim KO-D Openweight Championship	

==== 2011 ====
Date	Event	Venue	Location	Final match	Ref.
January 30	Sweet Dreams! 2011	Korakuen Hall	Tokyo, Japan	Dick Togo (lineal) vs. Antonio Honda (interim) to unify the KO-D Openweight Championship	
February 19	Into the Fight 2011	Korakuen Hall	Tokyo, Japan	Dick Togo (c) vs. Harashima for the KO-D Openweight Championship	
March 27	Judgement 2011	Korakuen Hall	Tokyo, Japan	Dick Togo (c) vs. Kota Ibushi for the KO-D Openweight Championship	
May 4	Max Bump 2011	Korakuen Hall	Tokyo, Japan	Dick Togo (c) vs. Shuji Ishikawa for the KO-D Openweight Championship	
July 24	Ryōgoku Peter Pan 2011	Ryōgoku Kokugikan	Tokyo, Japan	Shuji Ishikawa (c) vs. Kudo for the KO-D Openweight Championship	
November 28	God Bless DDT 2011	Korakuen Hall	Tokyo, Japan	Kudo (c) vs. Harashima for the KO-D Openweight Championship	
December 31	Never Mind 2011	Korakuen Hall	Tokyo, Japan	Kudo (c) vs. Mikami for the KO-D Openweight Championship	

==== 2012 ====
Date	Event	Venue	Location	Final match	Ref.
January 29	Sweet Dreams! 2012	Korakuen Hall	Tokyo, Japan	Kudo (c) vs. Danshoku Dino for the KO-D Openweight Championship	
February 19	Into The Fight 2012	Korakuen Hall	Tokyo, Japan	Danshoku Dino (c) vs. Antonio Honda for the KO-D Openweight Championship	
March 11	Judgement 2012	Korakuen Hall	Tokyo, Japan	Danshoku Dino (c) vs. Hikaru Sato for the KO-D Openweight Championship	
April 1	Aprilfool 2012	Korakuen Hall	Tokyo, Japan	Sanshiro Takagi (c) vs. Masa Takanashi for the KO-D Openweight Championship	
May 4	Max Bump 2012	Korakuen Hall	Tokyo, Japan	Masa Takanashi (c) vs. Yuji Hino for the KO-D Openweight Championship	
August 18	Budokan Peter Pan	Nippon Budokan	Tokyo, Japan	Kota Ibushi (c) vs. Kenny Omega for the KO-D Openweight Championship	
December 31	Never Mind 2012	Korakuen Hall	Tokyo, Japan	El Generico (c) vs. Kenny Omega for the KO-D Openweight Championship	

==== 2013 ====
Date	Event	Venue	Location	Final match	Ref.
January 29	Sweet Dreams! 2013	Korakuen Hall	Tokyo, Japan	Kenny Omega (KO-D) vs. Isami Kodaka (Extreme) in a Winner Takes All match for the KO-D Openweight Championship and DDT Extreme Championship	
February 17	Into The Fight 2013	Korakuen Hall	Tokyo, Japan	Kenny Omega (c) vs. Harashima for the KO-D Openweight Championship	
March 20	Judgement 2013	Korakuen Hall	Tokyo, Japan	Kenny Omega (c) vs. Shigehiro Irie for the KO-D Openweight Championship	
May 3	Max Bump 2013	Korakuen Hall	Tokyo, Japan	Shigehiro Irie (c) vs. Kota Ibushi for the KO-D Openweight Championship	
August 18	Ryōgoku Peter Pan 2013	Ryōgoku Kokugikan	Tokyo, Japan	Shigehiro Irie (c) vs. Harashima for the KO-D Openweight Championship	
November 17	God Bless DDT 2013	Korakuen Hall	Tokyo, Japan	Yankee Nichokenju (Isami Kodaka and Yuko Miyamoto) (c) vs. Golden☆Lovers (Kota Ibushi and Kenny Omega) for the KO-D Tag Team Championship	
December 23	Never Mind 2013	Korakuen Hall	Tokyo, Japan	Harashima (c) vs. Yukio Sakaguchi for the KO-D Openweight Championship	

==== 2014 ====
Date	Event	Venue	Location	Final match	Ref.
January 26	Sweet Dreams! 2014	Korakuen Hall	Tokyo, Japan	Harashima (c) vs. Shigehiro Irie for the KO-D Openweight Championship	
February 23	Into The Fight 2014	Korakuen Hall	Tokyo, Japan	Harashima (c) vs. Masa Takanashi for the KO-D Openweight Championship	
March 21	Judgement 2014	Korakuen Hall	Tokyo, Japan	Harashima (c) vs. Kudo for the KO-D Openweight Championship	
April 29	Max Bump 2014	Korakuen Hall	Tokyo, Japan	Kudo (c) vs. Yasu Urano for the KO-D Openweight Championship	
August 17	Ryōgoku Peter Pan 2014	Ryōgoku Kokugikan	Tokyo, Japan	Harashima (c) vs. Kenny Omega and Isami Kodaka for the KO-D Openweight Championship	
November 30	God Bless DDT 2014	Korakuen Hall	Tokyo, Japan	Harashima (c) vs. Soma Takao for the KO-D Openweight Championship	
December 23	Never Mind 2014	Korakuen Hall	Tokyo, Japan	Harashima (c) vs. Shigehiro Irie for the KO-D Openweight Championship	

==== 2015 ====
Date	Event	Venue	Location	Final match	Ref.
January 25	Sweet Dreams 2015	Korakuen Hall	Tokyo, Japan	Harashima and Happy Motel (Konosuke Takeshita and Tetsuya Endo) vs. Kota Ibushi and Strong BJ (Daisuke Sekimoto and Yuji Okabayashi)	
February 21	Into the Fight 2015	Shinjuku Face	Tokyo, Japan	Golden☆Storm Riders (Daisuke Sasaki and Kota Ibushi) vs. Happy Motel (Antonio Honda and Konosuke Takeshita)	
March 29	Judgement 2015	Korakuen Hall	Tokyo, Japan	Strong BJ (Daisuke Sekimoto and Yuji Okabayashi) (c) vs. Danshoku Dino and Super Sasadango Machine for the KO-D Tag Team Championship	
April 29	Max Bump 2015	Korakuen Hall	Tokyo, Japan	Kota Ibushi (c) vs. Harashima for the KO-D Openweight Championship	
May 31	Audience 2015	Korakuen Hall	Tokyo, Japan	Harashima (c) vs. Kudo for the KO-D Openweight Championship	
August 23	Ryōgoku Peter Pan 2015	Ryōgoku Kokugikan	Tokyo, Japan	Kudo (c) vs. Yukio Sakaguchi for the KO-D Openweight Championship	
November 28	Osaka Octopus 2015	Osaka Prefectural Gymnasium	Osaka, Japan	Yukio Sakaguchi (c) vs. Isami Kodaka for the KO-D Openweight Championship	
December 23	Never Mind 2015	Korakuen Hall	Tokyo, Japan	Happy Motel (Konosuke Takeshita and Tetsuya Endo) vs. Yuji Okabayashi and Shigehiro Irie for the vacant KO-D Tag Team Championship	

==== 2016 ====
Date	Event	Venue	Location	Final match	Ref.
January 31	Sweet Dreams! 2016	Korakuen Hall	Tokyo, Japan	Isami Kodaka (c) vs. Masa Takanashi for the KO-D Openweight Championship	
February 28	Into The Fight 2016	Korakuen Hall	Tokyo, Japan	Harashima vs. Shigehiro Irie to determine the No. 1 contender for the KO-D Openweight Championship	
March 21	Judgement 2016: DDT 19th Anniversary	Ryōgoku Kokugikan	Tokyo, Japan	Isami Kodaka (c) vs. Harashima for the KO-D Openweight Championship	
April 24	Max Bump 2016	Korakuen Hall	Tokyo, Japan	Harashima (c) vs. Daisuke Sasaki for the KO-D Openweight Championship	
May 29	Audience 2016	Korakuen Hall	Tokyo, Japan	Daisuke Sasaki (c) vs. Konosuke Takeshita for the KO-D Openweight Championship	
August 28	Ryōgoku Peter Pan 2016	Ryōgoku Kokugikan	Tokyo, Japan	Konosuke Takeshita (c) vs. Shuji Ishikawa for the KO-D Openweight Championship	
November 23	God Bless DDT 2016	Korakuen Hall	Tokyo, Japan	Damnation (Shuji Ishikawa and Tetsuya Endo) vs. Harashima and Konosuke Takeshita	
December 4	Osaka Octopus 2016	Edion Arena Osaka	Osaka, Japan	Shuji Ishikawa (c) vs. Harashima for the KO-D Openweight Championship	
December 25	Never Mind 2016	Korakuen Hall	Tokyo, Japan	Harashima (c) vs. Shigehiro Irie for the KO-D Openweight Championship	

==== 2017 ====
Date	Event	Venue	Location	Final match	Ref.
January 29	Sweet Dreams! 2017	Korakuen Hall	Tokyo, Japan	Harashima (c) vs. Daisuke Sasaki for the KO-D Openweight Championship	
February 19	Into The Fight 2017	Korakuen Hall	Tokyo, Japan	Harashima and Kudo vs. Konosuke Takeshita and Dick Togo	
March 20	Judgement 2017: DDT 20th Anniversary	Saitama Super Arena	Saitama, Japan	Harashima (c) vs. Konosuke Takeshita for the KO-D Openweight Championship	
April 29	Max Bump 2017	Korakuen Hall	Tokyo, Japan	Konosuke Takeshita (c) vs. Tetsuya Endo for the KO-D Openweight Championship	
May 28	Audience 2017	Korakuen Hall	Tokyo, Japan	Konosuke Takeshita (c) vs. Yasu Urano for the KO-D Openweight Championship	
August 20	Ryōgoku Peter Pan 2017	Ryōgoku Kokugikan	Tokyo, Japan	Konosuke Takeshita (c) vs. Tetsuya Endo for the KO-D Openweight Championship	
November 23	God Bless DDT 2017	Korakuen Hall	Tokyo, Japan	HarashiMarufuji (Harashima and Naomichi Marufuji) (c) vs. All Out (Konosuke Takeshita and Akito) for the KO-D Tag Team Championship	
December 24	Never Mind 2017	Korakuen Hall	Tokyo, Japan	Konosuke Takeshita (c) vs. Colt Cabana for the KO-D Openweight Championship	

==== 2018 ====
Date	Event	Venue	Location	Final match	Ref.
February 25	Into The Fight 2018	Korakuen Hall	Tokyo, Japan	Shuji Ishikawa and Daisuke Sekimoto vs. Konosuke Takeshita and Harashima	
March 25	Judgement 2018: DDT 21st Anniversary	Ryōgoku Kokugikan	Tokyo, Japan	Konosuke Takeshita (c) vs. Shuji Ishikawa for the KO-D Openweight Championship	
April 29	Max Bump 2018	Korakuen Hall	Tokyo, Japan	Konosuke Takeshita (c) vs. Shigehiro Irie for the KO-D Openweight Championship	
October 21	Ryōgoku Peter Pan 2018	Ryōgoku Kokugikan	Tokyo, Japan	Danshoku Dino (c) vs. Daisuke Sasaki for the KO-D Openweight Championship	

==== 2019 ====
Date	Event	Venue	Location	Final match	Ref.
January 29	Sweet Dreams! 2019	Korakuen Hall	Tokyo, Japan	Daisuke Sasaki and Harashima vs. Konosuke Takeshita and Shinya Aoki	
February 17	Judgement 2019: DDT 22nd Anniversary	Ryōgoku Kokugikan	Tokyo, Japan	Daisuke Sasaki (c) vs. Konosuke Takeshita for the KO-D Openweight Championship	
March 21	Into The Fight 2019	Korakuen Hall	Tokyo, Japan	Harashima (c) vs. Muscle Sakai for the DDT Extreme Championship	
April 4	DDT Is Coming to America	La Boom	New York, United States	Daisuke Sasaki (c) vs. Tetsuya Endo for the KO-D Openweight Championship	
April 28	Max Bump 2019	Korakuen Hall	Tokyo, Japan	Tetsuya Endo (c) vs. Makoto Oishi for the KO-D Openweight Championship	
May 20	Audience 2018	Korakuen Hall	Tokyo, Japan	Shigehiro Irie (c) vs. Keisuke Ishii for the KO-D Openweight Championship	
July 15	Wrestle Peter Pan 2019	Ota City General Gymnasium	Tokyo, Japan	Tetsuya Endo (c) vs. Konosuke Takeshita for the KO-D Openweight Championship	
September 1	Osaka Octopus 2019	Edion Arena Osaka	Osaka, Japan	Konosuke Takeshita (c) vs. Shinya Aoki for the KO-D Openweight Championship	
November 3	Ultimate Party 2019	Ryōgoku Kokugikan	Tokyo, Japan	Harashima (Extreme) vs. Konosuke Takeshita (KO-D) in a Winner Takes All match for the KO-D Openweight Championship and DDT Extreme Championship	
November 24	God Bless DDT 2019	Korakuen Hall	Tokyo, Japan	Harashima (c) vs. Yuki Iino for the KO-D Openweight Championship	

=== 2020s ===
==== 2020 ====
Date	Event	Venue	Location	Final match	Notes	Ref.
January 26	Sweet Dreams! 2020	Korakuen Hall	Tokyo, Japan	Harashima (c) vs. Masato Tanaka for the KO-D Openweight Championship		
February 23	Into The Fight 2020	Korakuen Hall	Tokyo, Japan	Masato Tanaka (c) vs. Mao for the KO-D Openweight Championship		
March 20	Judgement 2020: DDT 23rd Anniversary	Korakuen Hall	Tokyo, Japan	Masato Tanaka (c) vs. Konosuke Takeshita for the KO-D Openweight Championship		
June 6	Wrestle Peter Pan 2020	DDT TV Show Studio	Tokyo, Japan	Konosuke Takeshita vs. Yoshihiko in a Last Man Standing match	Held without a live audience due to the COVID-19 pandemic	
June 7	Wrestle Peter Pan 2020	DDT TV Show Studio	Tokyo, Japan	Masato Tanaka (c) vs. Tetsuya Endo for the KO-D Openweight Championship	Held without a live audience due to the COVID-19 pandemic	
November 3	Ultimate Party 2020	Ota City General Gymnasium	Tokyo, Japan	Tetsuya Endo (c) vs. Daisuke Sasaki for the KO-D Openweight Championship		

==== 2021 ====
Date	Event	Venue	Location	Final match	Ref.
February 14	Kawasaki Strong 2021	Culttz Kawasaki	Kawasaki, Japan	Tetsuya Endo (c) vs. Jun Akiyama for the KO-D Openweight Championship	
February 28	Into The Fight 2021	Korakuen Hall	Tokyo, Japan	Shunma Katsumata (c) vs. Mao for the DDT Extreme Championship	
March 28	Judgement 2021: DDT 24th Anniversary	Korakuen Hall	Tokyo, Japan	Jun Akiyama (c) vs. Kazusada Higuchi for the KO-D Openweight Championship	
May 4	Max Bump 2021	Korakuen Hall	Tokyo, Japan	Yuki Ueno (c) vs. Soma Takao for the DDT Universal Championship	
August 21	Wrestle Peter Pan 2021	Fujitsu Stadium Kawasaki	Kawasaki, Japan	Jun Akiyama (c) vs. Konosuke Takeshita for the KO-D Openweight Championship	
December 26	Never Mind 2021 in Yoyogi	Yoyogi National Gymnasium	Tokyo, Japan	Konosuke Takeshita (c) vs. Yuji Okabayashi for the KO-D Openweight Championship	

==== 2022 ====
Date	Event	Venue	Location	Final match	Ref.
January 30	Sweet Dreams! 2022	Korakuen Hall	Tokyo, Japan	Daisuke Sasaki (c) vs. Minoru Fujita for the DDT Universal Championship	
March 20	Judgement 2022: DDT 25th Anniversary	Ryōgoku Kokugikan	Tokyo, Japan	Konosuke Takeshita (c) vs. Tetsuya Endo for the KO-D Openweight Championship	
May 1	Mega Max Bump 2022 in Yokohama	Yokohama Budokan	Yokohama, Japan	Tetsuya Endo (c) vs. Yuki Ueno for the KO-D Openweight Championship	
May 22	Audience 2022	Korakuen Hall	Tokyo, Japan	Damnation T.A. (Daisuke Sasaki, Kanon and MJ Paul) vs. Eruption (Yukio Sakaguchi, Kazusada Higuchi and Hideki Okatani) for the vacant KO-D 6-Man Tag Team Championship	
August 20	Wrestle Peter Pan 2022	Ota City General Gymnasium	Tokyo, Japan	Kazusada Higuchi (c) vs. Tetsuya Endo for the KO-D Openweight Championship	
October 23	God Bless DDT 2022	Korakuen Hall	Tokyo, Japan	Kazusada Higuchi (c) vs. Yukio Sakaguchi for the KO-D Openweight Championship	
December 29	Never Mind 2022	Tokyo Dome City Hall	Tokyo, Japan	Kazusada Higuchi (c) vs. Yuki Ueno for the KO-D Openweight Championship	

==== 2023 ====
Date	Event	Venue	Location	Final match	Ref.
January 29	Sweet Dreams! 2023	Korakuen Hall	Tokyo, Japan	Kazusada Higuchi (c) vs. Yuji Hino for the KO-D Openweight Championship	
February 26	Into The Fight 2023	Korakuen Hall	Tokyo, Japan	Harashima vs. Yukio Naya to determine the No. 1 contender for the KO-D Openweight Championship	
March 21	Judgement 2023	Korakuen Hall	Tokyo, Japan	Yuji Hino (c) vs. Yukio Naya for the KO-D Openweight Championship	
May 3	Mega Max Bump 2023 in Yokohama	Yokohama Budokan	Yokohama, Japan	Yuji Hino (c) vs. Yuki "not Sexy" Iino for the KO-D Openweight Championship	
July 23	Wrestle Peter Pan 2023	Ryōgoku Kokugikan	Tokyo, Japan	Yuji Hino (c) vs. Chris Brookes for the KO-D Openweight Championship	
October 22	God Bless DDT 2023	Korakuen Hall	Tokyo, Japan	The37Kamiina (Yuki Ueno and Mao) vs. Chris Brookes and Harashima	
November 12	Ultimate Party 2023	Ryōgoku Kokugikan	Tokyo, Japan	Chris Brookes (c) vs. Yuki Ueno for the KO-D Openweight Championship	

==== 2024 ====
Date	Event	Venue	Location	Final match	Ref.
January 28	Sweet Dreams! 2024	Korakuen Hall	Tokyo, Japan	Yuki Ueno (c) vs. Yukio Naya for the KO-D Openweight Championship	
February 25	Into The Fight 2024	Korakuen Hall	Tokyo, Japan	The37Kamiina (Shunma Katsumata and Yuki Ueno) and Kaisei Takechi vs. Hideki Okatani, Takeshi Masada and Tetsuya Endo	
March 17	Judgement 2024	Korakuen Hall	Tokyo, Japan	Yuki Ueno (c) vs. Harashima for the KO-D Openweight Championship	
July 21	Wrestle Peter Pan 2024	Ryogoku Kokugikan	Tokyo, Japan	Yuki Ueno (c) vs. Mao for the KO-D Openweight Championship	
September 29	Dramatic Infinity 2024	Korakuen Hall	Tokyo, Japan	The37Kamiina (Mao and Yuki Ueno) and Kaisei Takechi vs. Schadenfreude International (Chris Brookes, Masahiro Takanashi and Takeshi Masada)	
October 24	God Bless DDT 2024	Korakuen Hall	Tokyo, Japan	Shinya Aoki (c) vs. Shunma Katsumata for the KO-D Openweight Championship	
December 22	Never Mind 2024	Korakuen Hall	Tokyo, Japan	Damnation T.A. (Daisuke Sasaki and Kanon) vs. Calamari Drunken Kings (Chris Brookes and Masahiro Takanashi)	
December 28	Ultimate Party 2024	Ryōgoku Kokugikan	Tokyo, Japan	Chris Brookes (c) vs. Daisuke Sasaki for the KO-D Openweight Championship	

==== 2025 ====
Date	Event	Venue	Location	Final match	Ref.
March 20	Judgement 2025	Korakuen Hall	Tokyo, Japan	Chris Brookes (c) vs. Masahiro Takanashi for the KO-D Openweight Championship	
June 29	King of Kings	Korakuen Hall	Tokyo, Japan	Chris Brookes (c) vs. Kazusada Higuchi for the KO-D Openweight Championship	
August 30	Wrestle Peter Pan 2025	Tokyo Higashin Arena	Tokyo, Japan	Kazusada Higuchi (c) vs. Jun Akiyama for the KO-D Openweight Championship	
August 31	Wrestle Peter Pan 2025	Korakuen Hall	Tokyo, Japan	Kazusada Higuchi (c) vs. Yuki Ueno for the KO-D Openweight Championship	
September 28	Dramatic Infinity 2025	Korakuen Hall	Tokyo, Japan	Yuki Ueno (c) vs. Kazuma Sumi for the KO-D Openweight Championship	
November 3	Ultimate Party 2025	Ryōgoku Kokugikan	Tokyo, Japan	Yuki Ueno (Openweight) vs. Minoru Suzuki (Universal) in a Winner takes all match for the KO-D Openweight Championship and DDT Universal Championship	

==== 2026 ====
Date	Event	Venue	Location	Final match	Ref.
March 11	Ichi ka Bachi ka 2026	Shinjuku Face	Tokyo, Japan	The37Kamiina (Yuki Ueno and To-y) and Kaisei Takechi (c) vs. Paleyouth (Takeshi Masada, Yuya Koroku and Daichi Sato) for the KO-D 6-Man Tag Team Championship	
March 20	Judgement 2026	Korakuen Hall	Tokyo, Japan	Yuki Ueno (c) vs. Kanon for the KO-D Openweight Championship	
August 11	Wrestle Peter Pan 2026	Ryōgoku Kokugikan	Tokyo, Japan	Yuki Ueno (c) vs. Mao for the KO-D Openweight Championship	
September 21	Dramatic Infinity 2026	Korakuen Hall	Tokyo, Japan	Mao (c) vs. Ilusion for the KO-D Openweight Championship	
November 3	Ultimate Party 2026	Ryōgoku Kokugikan	Tokyo, Japan	Mao (c) vs. Chris Brookes for the KO-D Openweight Championship	

== Tokyo Dome events ==
The Tokyo Dome stadium in Bunkyo, Tokyo, Japan has hosted a number of professional wrestling supercard events over the years. DDT has had held two of these kind of events in the venue.

Event	Date	Main event	Ref
Street Wrestling	June 1, 2017	Minoru Suzuki vs. Sanshiro Takagi	
Tokyo Dome Cup	October 31, 2021	The 37Kamiina (Konosuke Takeshita, Mao, Shunma Katsumata & Yuki Ueno) vs. Brahman Brothers (Brahman Kei & Brahman Shu), Chris Brookes & Gorgeous Matsuno and 121000000 (Maki Itoh & Miyu Yamashita), Hikari Noa & Hyper Misao vs. Pheromones (Danshoku Dino, Yuki Iino & Yumehito Imanari) & Tetsuya Endo vs. Kazuki Hirata, Kazusada Higuchi, Kouzi & Shinya Aoki	

== Shared events ==
=== CyberFight ===
Starting with 2021, due to being part of the CyberFight mother promotion, DDT began co-hosting the "CyberFight Festival" events alongside sister-promotions Pro Wrestling Noah, Tokyo Joshi Pro Wrestling and Ganbare Pro-Wrestling. As of November 20, 2026, DDT has taken part in three of this kind of pay-per-views.

Event	Date	Location	Venue	Main event	Ref
CyberFight Festival 2021	June 6, 2021	Saitama, Japan	Saitama Super Arena	Keiji Mutoh (c) vs. Naomichi Marufuji for the GHC Heavyweight Championship	
CyberFight Festival 2022	June 12, 2022	Saitama, Japan	Saitama Super Arena	Go Shiozaki (c) vs. Satoshi Kojima for the GHC Heavyweight Championship	

=== Other promotions ===
Throughout the years, DDT has partnered with various promotions from the Japanese independent wrestling scene. The most notable of these were the year-end Korakuen Hall shows, during which DDT collaborated with other independent promotions from 2006 to 2012. These events primarily featured confrontations between two or more wrestlers from different promotions.

Event	Date	Location	Venue	Promotions	Main event	Ref
Indy Summit 2006	December 31, 2006	Tokyo, Japan	Korakuen Hall	Apache, BJW, DDT, El Dorado, IWA Japan, K-Dojo, M-Pro, OPW	Gaina, Kengo Mashimo and Naoki Tanizaki vs. Daisuke Sekimoto, Harashima and Billyken Kid	
Pro-Wrestling Summit in Korakuen	December 31, 2007	Tokyo, Japan	Korakuen Hall	Various	Shuji Kondo, Yoshihito Sasaki and Daisuke Sekimoto vs. Kengo Mashimo, Harashima and Tetsuhiro Kuroda	
Tenka Sanbun no Kei	2007–2015	Various	Various	BJW, DDT, K-Dojo	Multiple	
Pro-Wrestling Summit 2008	December 31, 2008	Tokyo, Japan	Korakuen Hall	Various	Kengo Mashimo, Daisuke Sekimoto and Atsushi Aoki vs. Mammoth Sasaki, Yoshihito Sasaki and Shuji Ishikawa	
Tenka Sanbun no Kei: Ōmisoka New Year's Eve Special	December 31, 2009	Tokyo, Japan	Korakuen Hall	BJW, DDT, K-Dojo	108-person New Year's Eve Rumble	
Ōmisoka New Year's Eve Pro-Wrestling 2010 Countdown Special	December 31, 2010	Tokyo, Japan	Korakuen Hall	BJW, DDT, K-Dojo, Ice Ribbon, Freedoms	Kengo Mashimo, Yuko Miyamoto, Mammoth Sasaki, Munenori Sawa and Kazuhiro Tamura vs. Harashima, Shuji Ishikawa, Yoshihito Sasaki, Fujita "Jr." Hayato and Emi Sakura	
New Year's Eve Pro-Wrestling 2011	December 31, 2011	Tokyo, Japan	Korakuen Hall	Various	74-person tag team match	
New Year's Eve Pro-Wrestling 2012	December 31, 2012	Tokyo, Japan	Korakuen Hall	Various	Falls count anywhere match won by Abdullah Kobayashi after defeating Shiori Asahi	

== See also ==
- List of DDT Pro-Wrestling personnel
