= Ōmisoka New Year's Eve Pro-Wrestling 2010 Countdown Special =

2010 Japanese pro-wrestling event

- Promotion(s): Big Japan Pro Wrestling; DDT Pro-Wrestling; Ice Ribbon; Kaientai Dojo; Pro Wrestling Freedoms
- Date: December 31, 2010
- City: Tokyo, Japan
- Venue: Korakuen Hall
- Attendance: 2,011

December 31 Korakuen Hall Show chronology
← Previous; Tenka Sanbun no Kei: Ōmisoka New Year's Eve Special	Next → New Year's Eve Pro-Wrestling 2011

Aim For a Large Gathering of 30 Promotions! Ōmisoka New Year's Eve Pro-Wrestling 2010 Countdown Special (Japanese: 目指せ30団体大集結!大晦日年越しプロレス2010 カウントダウンスペシャル, Hepburn: Mezase Sanjū Dantai Dai Shūketsu! Ōmisoka Toshikoshi Puroresu 2010 Kauntodaun Supesharu) was a Japanese professional wrestling event co-promoted by Big Japan Pro Wrestling (BJW), DDT Pro-Wrestling (DDT), Ice Ribbon, Kaientai Dojo (K-Dojo) and Pro Wrestling Freedoms. The event, held on December 31, 2010, at Korakuen Hall in Tokyo, Japan featured sixteen matches and aired on Fighting TV Samurai.

In addition to the five main promotions featured, the event saw the participations of wrestlers from 19 O'Clock Joshi Pro-Wrestling, Akiba Pro-Wrestling, Battlarts, Chiba Happy Pro-Wrestling, Dove Pro-Wrestling, Guts World Pro-Wrestling, Hanayashiki Pro-Wrestling, Hokuto Pro-Wrestling, International Wrestling Association of Japan, JWP Joshi Puroresu, Kouhaku Pro-Wrestling, Michinoku Pro Wrestling, New Beijing Pro-Wrestling, Office Kana, Okinawa Pro-Wrestling, Osaka Pro Wrestling, Pancrase, Pro-Wrestling Alive & Majors, Pro Wrestling Noah, Pro-Wrestling Secret Base, Pro-Wrestling Team Dera, Professional Wrestling Wallabee, Saitama Pro-Wrestling, SGP, Sportiva Entertainment, Storm, Style-E, Toryumon Japan, Union Pro-Wrestling, West Gate Wrestling Federation, Wrestling of Darkness 666, Yokohama Muscle Factory and Yokohama Pro-Wrestling.

The event was headlined by a 5-on-5 elimination match pitting the team of Harashima, Shuji Ishikawa, Yoshihito Sasaki, Fujita "Jr." Hayato and Emi Sakura against Kengo Mashimo, Yuko Miyamoto, Mammoth Sasaki, Munenori Sawa and Kazuhiro Tamura. Other prominent features saw a one night eight-person single elimination tournament where all the matches were fought with a three minutes time limit, and a 34-person rumble rules battle royal in which each participant represented a different promotion by bringing a weapon symbolic of that promotion.

== Production ==
=== Background ===
The tradition of holding a joint event for smaller promotions on New Year's Eve at Korakuen Hall started with the 2006 Indy Summit. After two Pro-Wrestling Summits in 2007 and 2008, and the special edition of Tenka Sanbun no Kei in 2009, the New Year's Eve Pro-Wrestling brand returned in 2010, this time with the addition of Ice Ribbon and Pro Wrestling Freedoms as the main producers.

=== Storylines ===
The show featured sixteen professional wrestling matches that resulted from scripted storylines, where wrestlers portray villains, heroes, or less distinguishable characters in the scripted events that build tension and culminate in a wrestling match or series of matches.

=== One Night Tournament bracket ===
First round
Sanshiro Takagi	1:33
Command Bolshoi	Sub
Takashi Sasaki	3:00
Taka Michinoku	Janken
Yuki Ishikawa	Janken
Kana	3:00
Great Kojika	Pin
Guts Ishijima	1:48

Semifinals
Command Bolshoi	Pin
Taka Michinoku	2:07
Yuki Ishikawa	3:00
Great Kojika	Janken

Final
Command Bolshoi	Janken
Great Kojika	3:00

== Results ==
No.	Results	Stipulations	Times
1^{D}	Muscle Venus (Hikaru Shida and Tsukasa Fujimoto) defeated Kaori Yoneyama and Sayaka Obihiro by pinfall	Tag team match	9:35
2	Hikari Minami, Riho and Tsukushi defeated Bambi, Makoto and Hamuko Hoshi by pinfall	Six-woman tag team match	9:29
3	Ryuichi Sekine, Takumi Tsukamoto and Soma Takao defeated Hiroo Tsumaki, Akito and Tatsuhiko Yoshino by submission	Six-man tag team match	8:52
4	Command Bolshoi defeated Sanshiro Takagi by submission	One Night Tournament 2010 first round match	1:33
5	Taka Michinoku defeated Takashi Sasaki in rock-paper-scissors after the match went to a time limit draw	One Night Tournament 2010 first round match	3:00
6	Yuki Ishikawa defeated Kana in rock-paper-scissors after the match went to a time limit draw	One Night Tournament 2010 first round match	3:00
7	Great Kojika defeated Guts Ishijima by pinfall	One Night Tournament 2010 first round match	1:48
8	Command Bolshoi defeated Taka Michinoku by pinfall	One Night Tournament 2010 semi-final	2:07
9	Great Kojika defeated Yuki Ishikawa in rock-paper-scissors after the match went to a time limit draw	One Night Tournament 2010 semi-final	3:00
10	Command Bolshoi defeated Great Kojika in rock-paper-scissors after the match went to a time limit draw	One Night Tournament 2010 final	3:00
11	Ryuji Ito, Abdullah Kobayashi and Saburo Inematsu defeated Masashi Takeda, Isami Kodaka and Takeshi Minamino by pinfall	Fluorescent Light Tubes Deathmatch	16:22
12	Atsushi Ohashi defeated Gentaro by pinfall	Seven Referees match (Note: Referees: Yukinori Matsui, Eiji Tosaka, Lee Nikkan, Barb Sasaki, Daisuke Kiso, Chiyoko Chihana, Junichi Sato and Kyohei Wada (reserve))	13:15
13	Kenny Omega, Hiroki and Speed of Sounds (Tsutomu Oosugi and Hercules Senga) defeated Minoru, Kaji Tomato, Kamui and Madoka by pinfall	Eight-man tag team match	11:24
14	Funaki won by last eliminating Danshoku Dino	34-promotion Symbolic Weapon Rumble	40:51
15	Takeshi Morishima and Shuhei Taniguchi defeated Yuji Hino and Shigehiro Irie by pinfall	Tag team match	12:11
16	Kengo Mashimo, Yuko Miyamoto, Mammoth Sasaki, Munenori Sawa and Kazuhiro Tamura defeated Harashima, Shuji Ishikawa, Yoshihito Sasaki, Fujita "Jr." Hayato and Emi Sakura	5-on-5 elimination match	31:49
D / – this was a dark match

=== Symbolic Weapon Rumble entrances and eliminations ===
– Winner

Draw	Entrant	Promotion	Weapon	Order	Eliminated by	Method	Time	Eliminations
1	Danshoku Dino	DDT Pro-Wrestling	Male genitalia controller	33	Funaki	Over the top rope	40:51	3
2	Sakigake	Dove Pro-Wrestling	Oyster shell attached to a wooden spoon	2	Kazuhiko Ogasawara	Over the top rope	09:06	0
3	Choun Shiryu	New Beijing Pro-Wrestling	Lion dance mask	8	Daisuke	Over the top rope	17:24	1
4	Pandacar Robot	Hanayashiki Pro-Wrestling	Pandacar Robot Cart	1	Keita Yano	Over the top rope	06:06	0
5	Kikutaro	Akiba Pro-Wrestling	Smartphone	9	Jun Kasai	Pinfall	18:47	0
6	Keita Yano	Professional Wrestling Wallabee	Wallabee TV Championship belt	3	Kazuhiko Ogasawara	Over the top rope	09:13	1
7	Golden Pine	Okinawa Pro-Wrestling	Pineapple and gōyā	7	Daisuke	Over the top rope	16:39	0
8	Shuuoh Fujiwara	Pro-Wrestling Alive & Majors	Yo-yo	6	Bear Fukuda	Pinfall	15:45	0
9	Kazuhiko Ogasawara	Storm	Tonfa	5	Choun Shiryu	Over the top rope	15:01	3
10	Shinobu	Wrestling of Darkness 666	Masked Buddy	29	Keizo Matsuda	Over the top rope	35:31	0
11	Hikaru Sato	Pancrase	World Sato Championship belt and MMA trophy	10	Kaori Yoneyama (Note: Kaori Yoneyama was crowned the inaugural World Yoneyama Champion)	Over the top rope	20:01	0
12	Seiya Morohashi	Union Pro-Wrestling	Rubber tube	13	"Black Angel" Jaki Numazawa	Over the top rope	21:42	0
13	Daisuke Sekimoto	Yokohama Muscle Factory	Dumbbell	12	Jun Kasai	Over the top rope	21:42	0
14	Batten Tamagawa	West Gate Wrestling Federation	Comedy routine	4	Kazuhiko Ogasawara	Over the top rope	14:54	0
15	Bear Fukuda	Pro-Wrestling Secret Base	Mototsugu Shimizu	19	Marines Mask	Pinfall	27:37	1
16	Daisuke	Guts World Pro-Wrestling	GWC Singles Championship belt	17	Marines Mask	Over the top rope	25:29	3
17	The Kubota Brothers (Yasu Kubota and Hide Kubota)	Sportiva Entertainment	Akamiso and uirō	14	Daisuke	Over the top rope	22:35	0
18	Jun Kasai	Pro Wrestling Freedoms	Takashi Sasaki's costume	24	The Brahman Brothers	Over the top rope	32:22	2
19	Kaori Yoneyama	JWP Joshi Puroresu	JWP Openweight Championship belt	20	Kenbai	Over the top rope	28:46	2
20	Sayaka Obihiro	19 O'Clock Joshi Pro-Wrestling	Keyboard	11	Kaori Yoneyama	Over the top rope	20:03	0
21	"Black Angel" Jaki Numazawa	Big Japan Pro Wrestling	Steel chair	25	The Brahman Brothers	Over the top rope	32:37	1
22	Ricky Fuji	Hokuto Pro-Wrestling	Air guitar	15	Himself	DQ (did not enter in time)	22:40	0
23	Chii Tomiya	Ice Ribbon	Megaphone	31	Danshoku Dino	Pinfall	38:08	1
24	Shining Tiger Big Buddy	Yokohama Pro-Wrestling	Tokyo Sports Puroresu 2010 Newcomer Award plaque	16	Danshoku Dino	Over the top rope	24:34	0
25	Marines Mask	Kaientai Dojo	Flag	21	Masato Shibata	Over the top rope	31:09	2
26	Ultraman Robin	SGP	Space kaiju	18	Himself	DQ (did not enter in time)	27:00	0
27	Chiba Man	Chiba Happy Pro-Wrestling	Chiba-kun doll	22	Masato Shibata	Over the top rope	31:40	0
28	Kenbai	Michinoku Pro Wrestling	Katana	23	Himself	Over the top rope	31:58	1
29	Masamune	Osaka Pro Wrestling	Takoyaki	27	Masato Shibata and other wrestlers	Pinfall	33:37	1
30	Masato Shibata	Style-E	Hamburger	26	Masamune	Pinfall	33:34	3
31	The Brahman Brothers (Brahman Shu and Brahman Kei)	Kouhaku Pro-Wrestling	Toru Owashi's "severed head"	32	Danshoku Dino	Over the top rope	39:01	3
32	Keizo Matsuda	IWA Japan	IWA World Heavyweight Championship belt	30	Chii Tomiya	Over the top rope	35:54	1
33	Survival Tobita	Saitama Pro-Wrestling	Megaphone	28	The Brahman Brothers	Over the top rope	34:04	0
34	Funaki	Freelance	None	–	Winner	–	–	1

=== 5-on-5 elimination match ===
Eliminated	Wrestler	Eliminated by	Method	Time
1	Harashima	Kazuhiro Tamura	Over the top rope	14:04
2	Kazuhiro Tamura	Shuji Ishikawa	Over the top rope	17:26
3	Fujita "Jr." Hayato	Munenori Sawa	Over the top rope	19:12
4	Emi Sakura	Kengo Mashimo	Over the top rope	23:51
5	Munenori Sawa	Yoshihito Sasaki	Over the top rope	25:38
6	Yoshihito Sasaki	Yuko Miyamoto	Pinfall	26:17
7	Yuko Miyamoto	Shuji Ishikawa	Pinfall	27:43
8	Shuji Ishikawa	Mammoth Sasaki	Pinfall	31:49
Winners:	Kengo Mashimo, Yuko Miyamoto, Mammoth Sasaki, Munenori Sawa and Kazuhiro Tamura			
