= New Year's Eve Pro-Wrestling 2011 =

2011 Japanese pro-wrestling event

- Promotion: See below
- Brand: New Year's Eve Pro-Wrestling
- Date: December 31, 2011
- City: Tokyo, Japan
- Venue: Korakuen Hall
- Attendance: 1,109

New Year's Eve Pro-Wrestling chronology
← Previous; 2010	Next → 2012

Samurai TV 15th Anniversary Indie no Oshigoto Presents New Year's Eve Pro-Wrestling 2011 (サムライTV開局15周年記念インディーのお仕事プレゼント 年越しプロレス2011, Samurai Tī Bui Kaikyoku Jūgo Shūnen Kinen Indī no Oshigoto Purezento Toshikoshi Puroresu 2011) was a Japanese professional wrestling event promoted by the New Year's Eve Pro-Wrestling Committee, comprising multiple independent wrestling promotions. The event, held on December 31, 2011, at Korakuen Hall in Tokyo, Japan aired live on Fighting TV Samurai.

Ten matches were contested at the event, including a dark match. In the main event, a 74-person tag team match, the team led by Ken Ohka defeated the team led by Ryuichi Sekine. Other prominent matches saw the team of Great Kojika and Antonio Honda win a 15-team gauntlet match celebrating the 15th anniversary of the launch of the Samurai TV channel, and Naomichi Marufuji defeated Tatsuhiko Yoshino in a special singles match. The event also featured the Japan Indie Awards ceremony and the retirement ceremony of Munenori Sawa ending his 8-year career.

== Production ==
=== Background ===
The tradition of holding a joint event for smaller promotions on New Year's Eve at Korakuen Hall started with the 2006 Indy Summit. In 2009, the New Year's Eve Pro-Wrestling (年越しプロレス, Toshikoshi Puroresu) brand was created for the Tenka Sanbun no Kei: Ōmisoka New Year's Eve Special event.

There were twenty-one participating promotions and brands at the event:

- Big Japan Pro Wrestling (BJW)
- Combat Zone Wrestling (CZW)
- Daiwa Entertainment Pro-Wrestling (DEP)
- DDT Pro-Wrestling
- Guts World Pro-Wrestling
- Ice Ribbon
- Independent Wrestling Federation (IWF)
- JWP Joshi Puroresu
- Kaientai Dojo (K-Dojo)
- Kouhaku Pro-Wrestling
- Michinoku Pro Wrestling (M-Pro)
- New Beijing Pro-Wrestling (NBPW)
- Osaka Pro Wrestling (OPW)
- Pro Wrestling Freedoms
- Pro Wrestling Noah
- Pro-Wrestling Secret Base
- Sportiva Entertainment
- Style-E
- Union Pro-Wrestling
- World Wonder Ring Stardom
- Wrestling of Darkness 666

=== Storylines ===
The show featured ten professional wrestling matches that resulted from scripted storylines, where wrestlers portray villains, heroes, or less distinguishable characters in the scripted events that build tension and culminate in a wrestling match or series of matches.

== Results ==
No.	Results	Stipulations	Times
1^{D}	The Winger (Freedoms) and Madoka defeated Yasu Urano (DDT) and Owen Phoenix by pinfall	Tag team match	12:28
2	Hiroshi Fukuda (Union), Toru Sugiura (DEP) and Kotaro Nasu (Style-E) defeated Masashi Otani (BJW), Daichi Sasaki (M-Pro) and Dyna Mido by pinfall	Six-man tag team match	8:23
3	Soma Takao (DDT), Hiro Tonai (K-Dojo), Hayata (OPW) and Takumi Tsukamoto (BJW) defeated Jun Ogawauchi (Secret Base), Masaki Okimoto, Akito (Sportiva) and Kouzy (666) by pinfall	Eight-man tag team match	9:12
4	Takashi Sasaki (BJW), Gentaro (Freedoms) and Harashima (DDT) defeated Kazuhiro Tamura (Style-E), Kamui (Freedoms) and Mototsugu Shimizu (Secret Base) by pinfall	Six-man tag team match	10:59
5	Danshoku Dino (DDT) won by last eliminating Kaori Yoneyama (JWP) (Note: Order of entries: Danshoku Dino (DDT), Shinobu (666), Karate Brahman (Kouhaku), Mame Endo (666), Guts Ishijima (Guts World), Mio Shirai, Atsushi Ohashi (BJW), Kaji Tomato (K-Dojo), Kaji Burdock (CZW), Kaji Pot-au-feu (IWF), Spark Aoki (Secret Base), Kaori Yoneyama (JWP) Order of eliminations: Karate Brahman, Shinobu, Mame Endo, Guts Ishijima, Kaji Pot-au-feu, Spark Aoki, Kaji Tomato, Atsushi Ohashi, Mio Shirai, Kaji Burdock, Kaori Yoneyama)	Rumble rules battle royal with Yuji Okabayashi as the special guest referee	22:14
6	Great Kojika (BJW) and Antonio Honda defeated Chango (Secret Base) and Amigo Suzuki (Secret Base), Emi Sakura (Ice Ribbon) and Masa Takanashi (DDT), TKG48 (Sanshiro Takagi (Union) and Taka Michinoku (K-Dojo)), Choun Shiryu (NBPW) and Dynasty (666), Kawasaki Katsushika Saikyō Densetsu (Yoshiko and Natsuki☆Taiyo) (Stardom), 045 Junkie's (Jun Kasai (Freedoms) and "Black Angel" Jaki Numazawa (BJW)), Speed of Sounds (Tsutomu Oosugi and Hercules Senga) (Kouhaku), Little Galaxy (Shiori Asahi (K-Dojo) and Makoto Oishi (DDT)), The Kubota Brothers (Hide Kubota and Yasu Kubota) (Sportiva), Momo no Seishun Tag (Daisuke Harada and Atsushi Kotoge) (OPW), The Brahman Brothers (Brahman Shu and Brahman Kei), Masashi Takeda (Style-E) and Daisuke Sasaki (DDT), Shadow WX (BJW) and Ryuji Yamakawa (BJW), and Yankee Nichōkenjū (Yuko Miyamoto (666) and Isami Kodaka (Union))	Gauntlet tag team match	35:19
7	Ryuji Ito (BJW) and Takashi Sasaki (Freedoms) defeated Abdullah Kobayashi (BJW) and Ken Ohka (Union) by pinfall	Fluorescent Light Tubes Deathmatch	15:27
8	Naomichi Marufuji (Noah) defeated Tatsuhiko Yoshino (Guts World) by pinfall	Singles match	14:11
9	Daisuke Sekimoto (BJW) and Shuji Ishikawa (Union) defeated Kengo Mashimo (K-Dojo) and Ryuichi Sekine (K-Dojo) by pinfall	Tag team match	16:32
10	Jun Kasai, Abdullah Kobayashi, Daisuke Sekimoto, "Black Angel" Jaki Numazawa, Gentaro, Harashima, Shuji Ishikawa, Masked Buddy, Masashi Takeda, Makoto Oishi, Shiori Asahi, Great Kojika, Antonio Honda, Ken Ohka, Seiya Morohashi, Madoka, Daisuke Sasaki, Hiro Tonai, Soma Takao, Kaji Burdock, Kaji Pot-au-feu, Kaji Pot-au-feu 2, Kazuki Hirata, Takumi Tsukamoto, Kazuki Hashimoto, Atsushi Ohashi, Hayata, Masashi Otani, Guts Ishijima, Chango, Amigo Suzuki, Spark Aoki, Hide Kubota, Yasu Kubota, Daichi Sasaki, Dyna Mido, Natsuki☆Taiyo and Yoshiko defeated Ryuji Ito, Takashi Sasaki, Shadow WX, Kengo Mashimo, Sanshiro Takagi, Yuko Miyamoto, Ryuji Yamakawa, Danshoku Dino, Yuji Okabayashi, Taka Michinoku, Yasu Urano, Isami Kodaka, Kazuhiro Tamura, Ribbon Takanashi, Karate Brahman, Atsushi Kotoge, Kaji Tomato, Tsutomu Oosugi, Mototsugu Shimizu, Choun Shiryu, Masaki Okimoto, Jun Ogawauchi, Kamui, Akito, Kotaro Nasu, Hiroshi Fukuda, Toru Sugiura, Tatsuhiko Yoshino, Owen Phoenix, Mr. Pussy, Mame Endo, Dynasty, Kaori Yoneyama, Emi Sakura, Carlos and Mio Shirai by pinfall	74-person tag team match	8:17
D / – this was a dark match

=== Gauntlet match ===
Elimination	Wrestler	Team	Eliminated by	Method	Time
1	Chango	Chango and Amigo Suzuki	Taka Michinoku	Pinfall	2:00
2	Emi Sakura	Emi Sakura and Masa Takanashi	Sanshiro Takagi	Pinfall	2:57
3	Sanshiro Takagi	TKG48	Natsuki☆Taiyo	Over the top rope	1:53
4	Choun Shiryu	Choun Shiryu and Dynasty	Yoshiko	Pinfall	2:45
5	Yoshiko	Kawasaki Katsushika Saikyō Densetsu	Jun Kasai	Over the top rope	1:49
6	Jun Kasai	045 Junkie's	Tsutomu Oosugi	Over the top rope	2:16
7	Tsutomu Oosugi	Speed of Sounds	Shiori Asahi	Over the top rope	2:58
8	Shiori Asahi	Little Galaxy	Atsushi Kotoge	Over the top rope	1:40
9	Yasu Kubota	The Kubota Brothers	Daisuke Harada	Pinfall	2:46
10	Atsushi Kotoge	Momo no Seishun Tag	Brahman Shu	Pinfall	2:05
11	Daisuke Sasaki	Masashi Takeda and Daisuke Sasaki	Brahman Shu	Over the top rope	3:13
12	Brahman Kei	The Brahman Brothers	Ryuji Yamakawa	Pinfall	1:56
13	Ryuji Yamakawa	Shadow WX and Ryuji Yamakawa	Great Kojika	Pinfall	2:25
14	Yuko Miyamoto	Yankee Nichōkenjū	Great Kojika	Over the top rope	4:36
Winners:	Great Kojika and Antonio Honda				
