= December 31 Korakuen Hall Show =

Professional wrestling event series

- Promotions: Big Japan Pro Wrestling; DDT Pro-Wrestling
- First event: Indy Summit 2006

The December 31 Korakuen Hall Show is a professional wrestling event produced annually on December 31 at Korakuen Hall by various independent professional wrestling promotions such as Big Japan Pro Wrestling (BJW), DDT Pro-Wrestling (DDT) and Kaientai Dojo (K-Dojo).

The tradition of holding a joint event for smaller promotions on New Year's Eve at Korakuen Hall started with the 2006 Indy Summit. Until then, the venue was used for Nippon TV's Kasou Taishou broadcast. In 2007 and 2008, special editions of the Pro-Wrestling Summit were held. In 2009, a special event as part of the third Tenka Sanbun no Kei tour was held and birthed the New Year's Eve Pro-Wrestling (年越しプロレス, Toshikoshi Puroresu) brand that would persist for all future events.

== Events ==
#	Event	Date	Main Event	Ref
1	Indy Summit 2006	December 31, 2006	Daisuke Sekimoto, Harashima and Billyken Kid vs. Gaina, Kengo Mashimo and Naoki Tanizaki	
2	Pro-Wrestling Summit in Korakuen	December 31, 2007	Shuji Kondo, Yoshihito Sasaki and Daisuke Sekimoto vs. Kengo Mashimo, Harashima and Tetsuhiro Kuroda	
3	Pro-Wrestling Summit 2008	December 31, 2008	Mammoth Sasaki, Shuji Ishikawa and Yoshihito Sasaki vs. Kengo Mashimo, Daisuke Sekimoto and Atsushi Aoki	
4	Tenka Sanbun no Kei: Ōmisoka New Year's Eve Special	December 31, 2009	108-participant New Year's Eve Rumble	
5	Ōmisoka New Year's Eve Pro-Wrestling 2010 Countdown Special	December 31, 2010	Harashima, Shuji Ishikawa, Yoshihito Sasaki, Fujita "Jr." Hayato and Emi Sakura vs. Kengo Mashimo, Yuko Miyamoto, Mammoth Sasaki, Munenori Sawa and Kazuhiro Tamura in a 5-on-5 elimination match	
6	New Year's Eve Pro-Wrestling 2011	December 31, 2011	Team Ken Ohka vs. Team Ryuichi Sekine in a 74-person tag team match	
7	New Year's Eve Pro-Wrestling 2012	December 31, 2012	Falls count anywhere match featuring all the participants	
8	Tenka Tōitsu! Ōmisoka New Year's Eve Pro-Wrestling 2013	December 31, 2013	Harashima vs. Kengo Mashimo in the final of the Tenka Tōitsu! Strongest of Three Promotions Tournament	
9	Tenka Tōitsu! Three Promotions Strongest Tag Team Tournament	December 31, 2014	Yankee Nichōkenjū (Yuko Miyamoto and Isami Kodaka) vs. W Yuji (Yuji Hino and Yuji Okabayashi) in the final of the Three Promotions Strongest Tag Team Tournament	
10	New Year's Eve Pro-Wrestling 2015	December 31, 2015	Daisuke Sekimoto and Konosuke Takeshita vs. Harashima and Yuko Miyamoto in the final of the Toshiwasure! Three Promotions Shuffle Tag Tournament	
11	New Year's Eve Pro-Wrestling 2016	December 31, 2016	Hideyoshi Kamitani and Konosuke Takeshita vs. Kazusada Higuchi and Yoshihisa Utoh in the final of the Toshiwasure! Five Promotions Shuffle Tag Tournament	
12	New Year's Eve Pro-Wrestling 2017	December 31, 2017	Most Strongest Combi (Hideki Suzuki and Konosuke Takeshita) vs. SekiGuchi-gumi (Daisuke Sekimoto and Kazusada Higuchi) in the final of the Toshiwasure! Shuffle Tag Tournament	
13	New Year's Eve Pro-Wrestling 2018	December 31, 2018	Bald & Blonde (Yuji Okabayashi and Yukio Sakaguchi) vs. Nishinari Elite Yankee Konosuke & Joshi Pro-Wrestling's Strongest Man (Yuko Miyamoto and Konosuke Takeshita) in the final of the Toshiwasure! Shuffle Tag Tournament	
14	New Year's Eve Pro-Wrestling 2019	December 31, 2019	Broomoto Chrisuke (Daisuke Sekimoto and Chris Brookes) vs. Nomura-gun (Tetsuya Endo and Takuya Nomura) in the final of the Toshiwasure! Shuffle Tag Tournament	
15	New Year's Eve Pro-Wrestling 2020	December 31, 2020	NakanoUeno (Yuki Ueno and Yasufumi Nakanoue) vs. Smile Pissari (Harashima and Yuji Okabayashi) in the final of the Toshiwasure! Shuffle Tag Tournament	
16	New Year's Eve Pro-Wrestling 2021	December 31, 2021	Leftovers (Harashima, Daichi Hashimoto and Kengo Mashimo) vs. Deadliftersi (Konosuke Takeshita, Yuji Okabayashi and Kuishinbo Kamen) in the final of the Toshiwasure! Shuffle 6-Man Tag Tournament	
17	New Year's Eve Pro-Wrestling 2022	December 31, 2022	Zero Hyaku (Yuki Ueno, Daichi Hashimoto and Yuma Aoyagi) vs. Driver's High (Mao, Shinya Aoki and Yuko Miyamoto) in the final of the Toshiwasure! Shuffle 6-Man Tag Tournament	
