= New Year's Eve Pro-Wrestling 2012 =

2012 Japanese pro-wrestling event

- Promotion: See below
- Brand: New Year's Eve Pro-Wrestling
- Date: December 31, 2012
- City: Tokyo, Japan
- Venue: Korakuen Hall
- Attendance: 1,058

New Year's Eve Pro-Wrestling chronology
← Previous; 2011	Next → 2013

Aim For Pro-Wrestling's 100th Anniversary - Shiori Asahi's Embrace As Many Years As You Can - New Year's Eve Pro-Wrestling 2012 (目指せプロレス100周年 旭志織の年の数だけ抱きしめて 年越しプロレス2012, Mezase Puroresu Hyaku-shūnen Asahi Shiori no Nen no Kazu Dake Dakishimete Toshikoshi Puroresu 2012) was a Japanese professional wrestling event promoted by the New Year's Eve Pro-Wrestling Committee, comprising multiple independent wrestling promotions. The event, held on December 31, 2012, at Korakuen Hall in Tokyo, Japan aired live on Fighting TV Samurai.

Eighteen bouts were contested at the event, including two dark matches. In the main event, Abdullah Kobayashi defeated Shiori Asahi in a Falls Count Anywhere match. Other prominent matches saw the team of Harashima and Danshoku Dino represent DDT Pro-Wrestling in a winning effort against the teams of Yoshihito Sasaki and Yuji Okabayashi (representing Big Japan Pro Wrestling), and Kengo Mashimo and Shiori Asahi (representing Kaientai Dojo). The event also featured the Japan Indie Awards ceremony and saw the surprise appearance of Get Wild (Takao Omori and Manabu Soya).

== Production ==
=== Background ===
The tradition of holding a joint event for smaller promotions on New Year's Eve at Korakuen Hall started with the 2006 Indy Summit. In 2009, the New Year's Eve Pro-Wrestling (年越しプロレス, Toshikoshi Puroresu) brand was created for the Tenka Sanbun no Kei: Ōmisoka New Year's Eve Special event.

2012 marked DDT Pro-Wrestling's 15th anniversary, Kaientai Dojo's 10th anniversary and Korakuen Hall's 50th anniversary. With Big Japan Pro Wrestling's 18 years of existence, this added up to 93 years, so promotions that were roughly 7 years old were invited to celebrate "Pro-Wrestling's 100th anniversary". The event also celebrated Shiori Asahi's 10th anniversary as a professional wrestler, which was mentioned in the event subtitle referencing Yasuo Baba's 1991 film Nami no Kazu Dake Dakishimete (波の数だけ抱きしめて).

There were fifteen participating promotions and brands at the event:

- All Japan Pro Wrestling (AJPW)
- Big Japan Pro Wrestling (BJW)
- Combat Zone Wrestling (CZW)
- DDT Pro-Wrestling
- Gatoh Move Pro Wrestling
- Kaientai Dojo (K-Dojo)
- Kouhaku Pro-Wrestling
- Pro Wrestling Freedoms
- Pro-Wrestling Secret Base
- Pro-Wrestling Team Dera
- Sportiva Entertainment
- Style-E
- Union Pro-Wrestling (UPW)
- Westside Xtreme Wrestling (wXw)
- Wrestling of Darkness 666 (666)

=== Storylines ===
The show featured thirteen professional wrestling matches that resulted from scripted storylines, where wrestlers portray villains, heroes, or less distinguishable characters in the scripted events that build tension and culminate in a wrestling match or series of matches. Five non-wrestling contests were also held including judo matches, a quiz and a karaoke challenge.

== Results ==
No.	Results	Stipulations	Times
1^{D}	Amigo Suzuki won by defeating Chris Trance (Note: Other participants: Gabriel Wolfe, Jonathon Bader, Negro Greco and Choun Shiryu)	Pro-Wrestling Olympics Battle Royal	3:40
2^{D}	Mad Dog and Vixsin defeated Tetsuya Endo (DDT) and Cherry (UPW) by pinfall	Mixed tag team match	5:08
3	Soma Takao (DDT) defeated Kazuki Hashimoto (BJW) by pinfall	Singles match	7:40
4	Shinya Ishikawa (BJW) and Shinobu (666) defeated Taishi Takizawa (K-Dojo) and Yuki Sato (K-Dojo) by submission	Tag team match	9:44
5	Taka Michinoku (K-Dojo), Daigoro Kashiwa (K-Dojo) and Psycho (K-Dojo) defeated Mikami (DDT), Masa Takanashi (DDT) and Akito (Sportiva) by pinfall	Six-man tag team match	8:26
6	Kankuro Hoshino (BJW) defeated Yuki Sato (K-Dojo)	Judo match	—
7	Ayumu Honda (K-Dojo) defeated Gota Ihashi (DDT)	Judo match	—
8	Michael Nakazawa (DDT) defeated Bad Bones (wXw)	Judo match	—
9	Shigehiro Irie (Dera) defeated Shinya Ishikawa (BJW) and Kaji Tomato (K-Dojo)	Quiz Challenge	—
10	Ricky Fuji (K-Dojo) (29.14 pts) defeated Mikami (DDT) (25.14 pts) and Ryuichi Kawakami (BJW) (23.14 pts) (Note: Fuji sang "Runaway" (by Bon Jovi); Mikami sang "Tsukematsukeru" (by Kyary Pamyu Pamyu); Kawakami sang "Another Orion" (by Fumiya Fujii))	Karaoke Challenge	—
11	Mototsugu Shimizu (Secret Base) won by last eliminating Makoto Oishi (DDT) (Note: Order of eliminations: Ken Ohka (UPW), The Winger (Freedoms), Bambi (K-Dojo), Tomomitsu Matsunaga (DDT), Karate Brahman, Emi Sakura (Gatoh Move), Ricky Fuji (K-Dojo), Yasu Urano (DDT), Atsushi Ohashi (BJW), Mame Endo (UPW) and Makoto Oishi)	12-person Rumble match for the Three Promotions Cinderella Championship	15:08
12	Masashi Takeda (U-File), Hoshitango (DDT) and Masada (CZW) defeated "Black Angel" Jaki Numazawa (BJW), Danny Havoc (CZW) and Saburo Inematsu (K-Dojo) by pinfall	Double Ring Hardcore Tables, Ladders and Chairs match	11:37
13	Get Wild (Takao Omori and Manabu Soya) (AJPW) defeated From The Northern Country (Antonio Honda and Daisuke Sasaki), The Brahman Brothers (Brahman Shu and Brahman Kei), Menso-re Oyaji and Golden Pine, Sumerian Death Squad (Tommy End and Michael Dante) (wXw), Speed Of Sounds (Tsutomu Oosugi and Hercules Senga) (Kouhaku), Team Dream Futures (Shigehiro Irie (Dera) and Keisuke Ishii (DDT)), and Abdullah Kobayashi (BJW) and Sanshiro Takagi (DDT)	Gauntlet match	18:19
14	Yankee Nichōkenjū (Yuko Miyamoto (666) and Isami Kodaka (UPW)) and Takumi Tsukamoto (BJW) defeated Ryuji Ito (BJW), Drake Younger (CZW) and Ryuichi Sekine (K-Dojo) by pinfall	Fluorescent Light Tubes Deathmatch	18:35
15	Osamu Nishimura defeated Hiroshi Fukuda (UPW) by submission	Singles match	9:15
16	Daisuke Sekimoto (BJW), Yuji Hino (K-Dojo) and Shuji Ishikawa (UPW)) defeated Hiro Tsumaki (UPW)), Hideyoshi Kamitani (BJW) and Tank Nagai (K-Dojo) by pinfall	Six-man tag team match	9:59
17	Harashima (DDT) and Danshoku Dino (DDT) defeated Kengo Mashimo (K-Dojo) and Shiori Asahi (K-Dojo), and Yoshihito Sasaki (BJW) and Yuji Okabayashi (BJW) by pinfall	Three-way tag team match	16:39
18	Abdullah Kobayashi won by defeating Shiori Asahi by pinfall (Note: All the wrestlers who were still in the building were participants)	Falls count anywhere match	4:05
D / – this was a dark match

=== Gauntlet match ===
Elimination	Wrestler	Team	Eliminated by	Method	Time
1	Antonio Honda	From The Northern Country	Brahman Shu	Pinfall	5:20
2	Menso-re Oyaji	Menso-re Oyaji and Golden Pine	Brahman Shu	Over the top rope	1:52
3	Brahman Kei	The Brahman Brothers	Michael Dante	Pinfall	3:33
4	Tsutomu Oosugi and Hercules Senga	Speed Of Sounds	Tommy End and Michael Dante	Over the top rope	1:40
5	Keisuke Ishii	Team Dream Futures	Tommy End	Over the top rope	3:12
6	Tommy End and Michael Dante	Sumerian Death Squad	Abdullah Kobayashi and Sanshiro Takagi	Over the top rope	2:29
7	Abdullah Kobayashi and Sanshiro Takagi	Abdullah Kobayashi and Sanshiro Takagi	Takao Omori and Manabu Soya	Over the top rope	0:13
Winners:	Get Wild (Takao Omori and Manabu Soya)				
