= Pro-Wrestling Summit 2008 =

2008 Japanese independent professional wrestling event

Pro-Wrestling Summit 2008: Countdown Pro-Wrestling
- Promotion: Apache, BJW, DDT, IWA Japan, K-Dojo, M-Pro, OPW
- Date: December 31, 2008
- City: Tokyo, Japan
- Venue: Korakuen Hall
- Attendance: 2,000

December 31 Korakuen Hall Show chronology
← Previous; Pro-Wrestling Summit in Korakuen	Next → Tenka Sanbun no Kei: Ōmisoka New Year's Eve Special

Pro-Wrestling Summit chronology
← Previous; Wakamusha III	Next → Wakamusha IV

Pro-Wrestling Summit 2008: Countdown Pro-Wrestling (プロレスサミット2008〜カウントダウンプロレス〜, Puroresu Samitto 2008: Kauntodaun Puroresu) was a Japanese professional wrestling event co-produced by Apache Pro-Wrestling Army, Big Japan Pro Wrestling (BJW), DDT Pro-Wrestling (DDT), International Wrestling Association of Japan (IWA Japan), Kaientai Dojo (K-Dojo), Michinoku Pro Wrestling (M-Pro) and Osaka Pro Wrestling (OPW) on December 31, 2008, at Korakuen Hall, with the participation of wrestlers from All Japan Pro Wrestling (AJPW), Battlarts, Dradition, Dragon Gate (DG), Hustle, New Japan Pro-Wrestling (NJPW), Okinawa Pro-Wrestling, Pro Wrestling Noah, Pro Wrestling Zero1 and Union Pro-Wrestling.

The event featured a mixture of wrestlers from different independent promotions facing each other in a total of nine matches. The main event was a six-man tag team match between the teams of Mammoth Sasaki (Apache), Yoshihito Sasaki (freelancer) and Shuji Ishikawa (Union), and Kengo Mashimo (K-Dojo), Daisuke Sekimoto (BJW) and Atsushi Aoki (Noah).

== Production ==
=== Background ===
Following the success of the 2006 Indy Summit, Taka Michinoku, who was in charge of the event, created the Pro-Wrestling Summit Committee to hold more joint shows. Summits were held in Osaka, Ariake and eventually at Korakuen Hall on New Year's Eve, thus continuing the tradition of the December 31 Korakuen Hall Show. The event was broadcast on Samurai! TV and Gaora.

=== Storylines ===
The 2008 Pro-Wrestling Summit featured nine professional wrestling matches that resulted from scripted storylines, where wrestlers portrayed villains, heroes, or less distinguishable characters in the scripted events that built tension and culminated in a wrestling match or series of matches.

== Results ==
No.	Results	Stipulations	Times
1	Yuta Yoshikawa (Battlarts), Tadasuke (OPW) and Yuji Okabayashi (BJW) defeated Kazuchika Okada (NJPW), Takuma Obe (IWA Japan) and Shikwasha Kamen (Okinawa Pro) by submission	Six-man tag team match	7:25
2	Masato Tanaka (Zero1) defeated Shigehiro Irie	Singles match	4:55
3	Men's Teioh (BJW) defeated Madoka, Kudo (DDT), Keizo Matsuda (IWA Japan), Speed of Sounds (Tsutomu Oosugi and Hercules Senga) and Yuki Sato	6-on-1 handicap match	14:56
4	The Great Sasuke (M-Pro), Ryuji Ito (BJW) and Takashi Sasaki (Apache) defeated Yuko Miyamoto, Saburo Inematsu (K-Dojo) and Isami Kodaka (Union)	Flurorescent Light Tubes Deathmatch	15:55
5	Harashima (DDT) and Munenori Sawa (Battlarts) defeated Hikaru Sato and Masashi Takeda by submission	Battlarts rules tag team match	12:28
6	Yutaka Yoshie (Dradition) and Shingo Takagi (DG) defeated Yuji Hino (K-Dojo) and Takemura	Tag team match	16:04
7	Gurentai (Minoru Suzuki and Yoshihiro Takayama) defeated Keita Yano (Battlarts) and Shinya Ishikawa (BJW)	Tag team match	13:00
8	Kagetora, Hiroshi Yamato (AJPW), Shinobu and Kushida (Hustle) defeated Makoto Oishi (K-Dojo), Tigers Mask (OPW), Shinjitsu Nohashi (M-Pro) and Daisuke Masaoka	Eight-man tag team match	18:24
9	Kengo Mashimo (K-Dojo), Daisuke Sekimoto (BJW) and Atsushi Aoki (Noah) defeated Mammoth Sasaki (Apache), Yoshihito Sasaki and Shuji Ishikawa (Union)	Six-man tag team match	23:54
