= Pro-Wrestling Summit in Korakuen =

2007 Japanese independent professional wrestling event

- Promotion: Apache, BJW, DDT, IWA Japan, K-Dojo, M-Pro, OPW
- Date: December 31, 2007
- City: Tokyo, Japan
- Venue: Korakuen Hall
- Attendance: 2,008

December 31 Korakuen Hall Show chronology
← Previous; Indy Summit 2006	Next → Pro-Wrestling Summit 2008

Pro-Wrestling Summit chronology
← Previous; Pro-Wrestling Summit in Ariake	Next → Wakamusha II

Pro-Wrestling Summit in Korakuen (プロレスサミット in KORAKUEN, Puroresu Samitto in Kōrakuen) was a Japanese professional wrestling event co-produced by Apache Pro-Wrestling Army, Big Japan Pro Wrestling (BJW), DDT Pro-Wrestling (DDT), International Wrestling Association of Japan (IWA Japan), Kaientai Dojo (K-Dojo), Michinoku Pro Wrestling (M-Pro) and Osaka Pro Wrestling (OPW) on December 31, 2007 at Korakuen Hall, with the participation of wrestlers from All Japan Pro Wrestling (AJPW), Battlarts, Big Mouth Loud (BML), Dragon Gate (DG), New Japan Pro-Wrestling (NJPW), Pancrase Mission, Pro-Wrestling El Dorado, Pro Wrestling Zero1-Max, Toryumon Mexico, Union Pro-Wrestling, Wrestling Marvelous Future (WMF) and Wrestling of Darkness 666.

The event featured a mixture of wrestlers from different independent promotions facing each other in a total of nine matches. The main event was a six-man tag team match between the teams of Shuji Kondo (El Dorado), Yoshihito Sasaki (Zero1) and Daisuke Sekimoto (BJW), and Kengo Mashimo (K-Dojo), Harashima (DDT) and Tetsuhiro Kuroda (Apache).

== Production ==
Other on-screen personnel
Role:	Name:
Ring announcers	Fuyuki Mikata
Ring announcers	Takeshi Murakami
Referees	Kyohei Wada
Referees	Lee Nikkan
Referees	Yukinori Matsui
Referees	Shogo Uchiyama

=== Background ===
Following the success of the 2006 Indy Summit, Taka Michinoku, who was in charge of the event, created the Pro-Wrestling Summit Committee to hold more joint shows. Summits were held in Osaka, Ariake and eventually at Korakuen Hall on New Year's Eve, thus continuing the tradition of the December 31 Korakuen Hall Show. The event was broadcast on Samurai! TV and Gaora.

=== Storylines ===
The Pro-Wrestling Summit in Korakuen featured nine professional wrestling matches that resulted from scripted storylines, where wrestlers portrayed villains, heroes, or less distinguishable characters in the scripted events that built tension and culminated in a wrestling match or series of matches.

== Results ==
No.	Results	Stipulations	Times
1	Spark Aoki (El Dorado), Yuki Sato and Rui Hiugaji (M-Pro) defeated Keita Yano (Battlarts), Takuma Obe (IWA Japan) and Atsushi Ohashi	Six-man tag team match	11:20
2	Great Kojika (BJW) and Shogun KY Wakamatsu won by last eliminating The Brahman Brothers (Brahman Shu and Brahman Kei) (El Dorado) (Note: Other participants by order of elimination: Nobutaka Araya (AJPW) and Nobukazu Hirai (AJPW), Tokyo Gurentai (Nosawa Rongai and Mazada), Ishinriki and Keizo Matsuda (IWA Japan), Makoto Oishi (K-Dojo) and Shinobu (666), Men's Teioh (BJW) and Danshoku Dino (DDT))	Tag team rumble	18:10
3	Minoru Suzuki (Pancrase) defeated Daisuke Harada (OPW) by submission	Singles match	11:14
4	The Great Sasuke (M-Pro), Gran Hamada (M-Pro), Taka Michinoku (K-Dojo) and Último Dragón (Toryumon Mexico) defeated Yujiro (NJPW), Asian Cougar (OPW), The Great Takeru (IWA Japan) and Mineo Fujita (WMF)	Eight-man tag team match	8:36
5	Manabu Hara (BML) defeated Munenori Sawa (Battlarts) by knockout	Battlarts rules singles match	11:05
6	Yoshihiro Takayama and Boso Boy Raito (K-Dojo) defeated Shuji Ishikawa (Union) and Shinjitsu Nohashi (M-Pro)	Tag team match	16:47
7	Ryuji Ito (BJW), "Black Angel" Jaki Numazawa (BJW) and Naoki Tanizaki defeated Takashi Sasaki (Apache), Yuko Miyamoto (666) and Saburo Inematsu (K-Dojo)	Flurorescent Light Tubes Deathmatch	18:40
8	Kota Ibushi (DDT), Madoka (K-Dojo) and B×B Hulk (DG) defeated Sanshiro Takagi (DDT), Abdullah Kobayashi (BJW) and Don Fujii (DG)	Six-man tag team match Ibushi won the Ironman Heavymetalweight Championship from Takagi	15:36
9	Shuji Kondo (El Dorado), Yoshihito Sasaki (Zero1) and Daisuke Sekimoto (BJW) defeated Kengo Mashimo (K-Dojo), Harashima (DDT) and Tetsuhiro Kuroda (Apache)	Six-man tag team match	23:40
