= Indy Summit 2006 =

2006 Japanese independent professional wrestling event

Indy Summit 2006: Countdown Pro-Wrestling
- Official poster for the event featuring various wrestlers
- Promotion: Apache, BJW, DDT, El Dorado, IWA Japan, K-Dojo, M-Pro, OPW
- Date: December 31, 2006
- City: Tokyo, Japan
- Venue: Korakuen Hall
- Attendance: 2,200

December 31 Korakuen Hall Show chronology
← Previous; First	Next → Pro-Wrestling Summit in Korakuen

Indy Summit chronology
← Previous; Indy Summit	Next → The Indie Summit 2011

Indy Summit 2006: Countdown Pro-Wrestling (インディー・サミット2006〜カウントダウンプロレス〜, Indī Samitto 2006: Kauntodaun Puroresu) was a Japanese professional wrestling event co-produced by Apache Pro-Wrestling Army, Big Japan Pro Wrestling (BJW), DDT Pro-Wrestling (DDT), Pro-Wrestling El Dorado, International Wrestling Association of Japan (IWA Japan), Kaientai Dojo (K-Dojo), Michinoku Pro Wrestling (M-Pro) and Osaka Pro Wrestling (OPW) on December 31, 2006 at Korakuen Hall, with the participation of wrestlers from Battlarts, Wrestling of Darkness 666, Toryumon Mexico, Dragon Gate (DG), World Wrestling Entertainment (WWE) and All Japan Pro Wrestling (AJPW).

The event featured a mixture of wrestlers from different independent promotions facing each other in a total of eight matches. The main event was a six-man tag team match between the teams of Daisuke Sekimoto (BJW), Harashima (DDT) and Billyken Kid (OPW), and Gaina (OPW), Kengo Mashimo (K-Dojo) and Naoki Tanizaki (freelancer).

== Production ==
Other on-screen personnel
Role:	Name:
Commentators	Haruo Murata
Commentators	Hirotsugu Suyama
Commentators	Sayoko Mita
Commentators	Eiji Tosaka (deathmatch)
Ring announcers	Fuyuki Mikata
Ring announcers	Takeshi Murakami

=== Background ===
On December 9, 2005, the first Indy Summit was held at Korakuen Hall to bring together various promotions of the independent circuit in order to produce a unique joint show. The idea came from Eiji Tosaka, who was the Big Japan Pro Wrestling General Manager at the time. Following the success of the first event, a second edition was scheduled for December 31, 2006. The event was broadcast on Samurai! TV and Gaora (via the Puro-Kaku King mobile app).

=== Storylines ===
Indy Summit 2006 featured eight professional wrestling matches that resulted from scripted storylines, where wrestlers portrayed villains, heroes, or less distinguishable characters in the scripted events that built tension and culminated in a wrestling match or series of matches.

== Results ==
No.	Results	Stipulations	Times
1	Hidehiro Nishiyama (IWA Japan), Kanjyuro Matsuyama (Toryumon Mexico) and Daisuke Harada (OPW) defeated Shinobu (666), Majami (DDT) and Kaji Yamato (K-Dojo)	Six-man tag team match	7:33
2	Disaster Box (Danshoku Dino and Michael Nakazawa) (DDT) defeated Basilisk ("The Handsome" Joe and Yasu Urano) (K-Dojo) and The Brahman Brothers (Brahman Shu and Brahman Kei) (El Dorado)	Three-way tag team match	17:25
3	Rasse (M-Pro), El Blazer (El Dorado) and Yuko Miyamoto (666) defeated Tigers Mask (OPW), Psycho (K-Dojo) and Takeshi Minamino (M-Pro)	Six-man tag team match	16:54
4	Great Kojika (BJW) won by last eliminating Jinsei Shinzaki (M-Pro) (Note: Order of entrances: Sanshiro Takagi (DDT), Taka Michinoku (K-Dojo), Super Delfin (OPW), Keizo Matsuda (IWA Japan), Karaoke Man #2 (El Dorado), Jinsei Shinzaki (M-Pro), Muscle Sakai (DDT), Great Kojika (BJW) Order of eliminations: Karaoke Man #2, Matsuda, Taka, Takagi, Super Delfin, Sakai, Shinzaki)	8-man One Million Yen Scramble President Rumble	18:12
5	Masaaki Mochizuki (DG) and Kota Ibushi (DDT) defeated Munenori Sawa (Battlarts) and Fujita "Jr." Hayato (M-Pro)	Battlarts rules tag team match	11:24
6	045 Junkie's (Jun Kasai (Apache) and "Black Angel" Jaki Numazawa (BJW)) and Shadow WX (BJW) defeated Takashi Sasaki (Apache), Kesen Numajiro (BJW) and Abdullah Kobayashi (M-Pro)	Fluorescent Light Tubes Deathmatch	19:39
7	Kai En Tai☆DX (Dick Togo (freelance), Men's Teioh (BJW), Taka Michinoku (K-Dojo), Shiryu (AJPW) and Sho Funaki (WWE)) defeated Makoto Oishi (K-Dojo), Kudo (DDT), Katsuya Kishi (IWA Japan), Shinjitsu Nohashi (M-Pro) and Milanito Collection a.t. (El Dorado)	Ten-man tag team match	17:18
8	Gaina (OPW), Kengo Mashimo (K-Dojo) and Naoki Tanizaki (freelance) defeated Daisuke Sekimoto (BJW), Harashima (DDT) and Billyken Kid (OPW)	Six-man tag team match	21:28
