= Mototsugu Shimizu =

Japanese professional wrestler

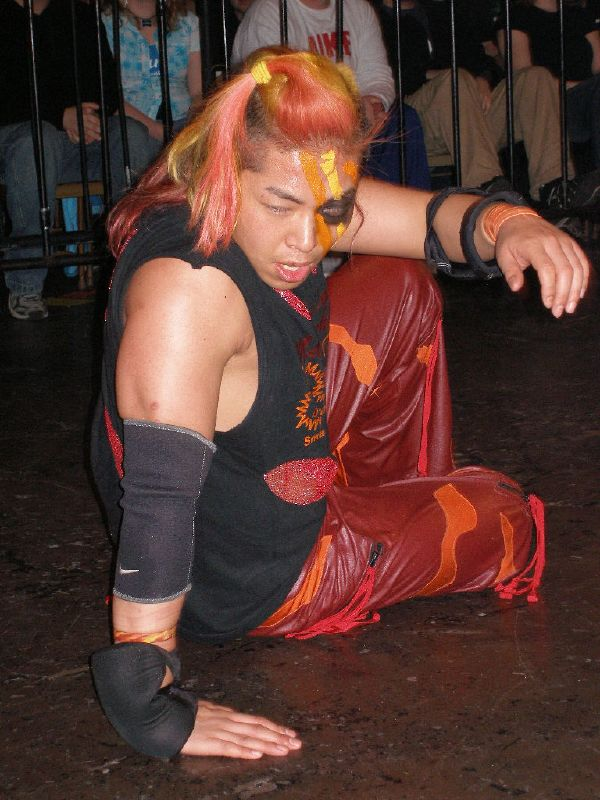
- Shimizu in March 2008

Personal information
- Born: 14 July 1977 (age 49) Suginami, Tokyo, Japan

Professional wrestling career
- Ring name: Motosugu Shimizu
- Billed height: 1.70 m (5 ft 7 in)
- Billed weight: 72 kg (159 lb)
- Trained by: Último Dragón; Dos Caras
- Debut: 26 February 2000

Mototsugu Shimizu (清水基嗣, Shimizu Mototsugu; born 14 July 1977 in Suginami, Tokyo, Japan) is a Japanese wrestler. He currently works in Secret Base.

== Career ==
He began his career with the T2P (Toryumon 2000 Project) group of students and had a very promising career until he was sidelined with a shoulder injury in September 2000. He became a ring announcer and other staff duties during his rehab time. In November 2003 he returned to the ring in exhibition matches for Toryumon Japan. But after Ultimo Dragon left Toryumon Japan in 2004 he did not make the jump to newly formed Dragon Gate. He returned by going back to ring announcing when he joined Dragondoor which showcased some of his former T2P mates. He officially returned to the ring full-time in January 2006 and began wrestling in Michinoku Pro and El Dorado. He began a violent feud with Manjimaru which ended with them having to collectively pay off the debts they accumulated in damages that occurred in their hardcore matches. He was then recruited into the Sukiyaki stable by Shuji Kondo, but after the stable dissolved, he went off on his own again.

On 29 February 2008, Shimizu competed in Chikara's 2nd annual King of Trios tournament, representing El Dorado alongside fellow Japanese Indy wrestlers Michael Nakazawa and Go. The team was eliminated in the first round by The Colony (Fire Ant, Soldier Ant and Worker Ant). On 2 March, the third night of the tournament, Shimizu and Go entered a tag team gauntlet match. Shimizu managed to eliminate Las Chivas Rayadas (Chiva III and Chiva IV) with the Marshmallow Hedgehog, before the team was eliminated by The Sweet 'n' Sour Incorporated (Sara Del Rey and Bobby Dempsey).

== Championships and accomplishments ==
- Guts World Pro Wrestling
  - GWC Tag Team Championship (1 time) – with Bear Fukuda
  - GWC Tag Team Title Tournament (2012) – with Bear Fukuda
- New Year's Eve Toshikoshi Pro Wrestling
  - 3 Organisation Cinderella Championship (1 time)
- Pro Wrestling Secret Base
  - Captain of the Secret Base Openweight Championship (1 time)
