= Kazuhiro Tamura =

Japanese professional wrestler (born 1980)

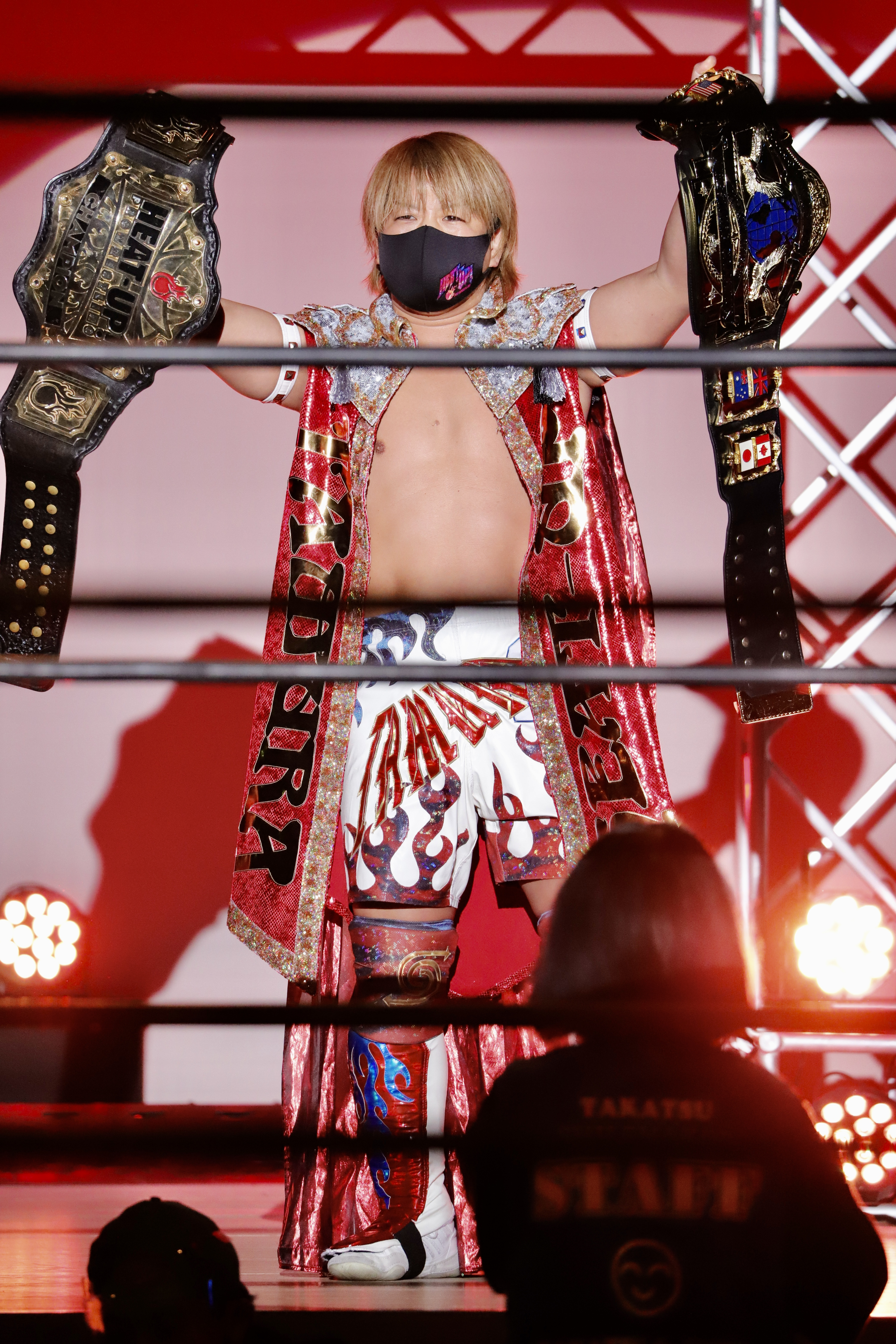
- Tamura in December 2020

Personal information
- Born: February 5, 1980 (age 46) Kawasaki, Kanagawa, Japan

Professional wrestling career
- Billed height: 1.60 m (5 ft 3 in)
- Billed weight: 70 kg (150 lb)
- Trained by: Minoru Tanaka; Yumi Fukawa; Takao Omori
- Debut: September 17, 2003

Kazuhiro Tamura (田村和宏, Tamura Kazuhiro; born February 5, 1980) is a Japanese professional wrestler and promoter, He is currently working for freelancer and Pro Wrestling Heat Up where he is the owner of the company and the former Heat Up Universal Champion. Tamura also works for All Japan Pro Wrestling (AJPW) where he is a former Gaora TV Champion. Tamura is also known for the time at Style-E Pro Wrestling, holding the Style-E Openweight Championship three times and won the E-1 Climax 2010.

== Professional wrestling career ==
=== Early career ===
Tamura started training both professional wrestling and mixed martial arts in the U-File Camp Dojo founded by Kiyoshi Tamura (no relation). After Minoru Tanaka's marriage with Yumi Fukawa, he started to focus on wrestling under their guidance and would later train under Takao Omori. He would later make his debut in Pro Wrestling Crusaders on September 17, 2003 and would then move to Style-E, a promotion organized by U-File Camp, later in the year.

=== Style-E Pro Wrestling (2004–2012) ===
On March 21, 2004, Tamura made his Style-E debut by defeating Masato Saeki. On September 23, Tamura defeated Hajime Moriyama in the first round of the E-1 Climax. On October 10, Tamura defeated Hidehisa Matsuda in the semi-final but fell to Kyosuke Sasaki in the finals, missing out on becoming the first Style-E Openweight Champion. In 2005, Tamura would once again reach the E-1 Climax final but lost to Takashi Echigo. In August 2006, Tamura entered a tournament to name the number one contender to the Style-E Openweight Championship but lost Chon Shiryu in the first round. On April 21, 2007, Tamura won his first professional wrestling championship by defeating Isami for the Style-E Openweight Championship. Tamura made three successful title defences before losing the title to Masa Takanashi on July 19, 2008. On February 21, 2009, Tamura regained the Style-E Openweight Championship from Takanashi. After two successful title defences, on December 19, he lost the Championship to Kenjiro Ohka.

On August 24, 2010, Tamura made his New Japan Pro-Wrestling debut teaming up with fellow debutante Yusuke Kodama and were defeated by Ryusuke Taguchi and Taichi at Never.1. From October 16 to December 18, Tamura participated in the 2010 E-1 Climax. Unlike previous years, the E-1 Climax used a round robin format with two blocks of four wrestlers; Tamura was in the B block. On December 5, Tamura defeated Takaku Fuke to tie the B block and defeated him a second time in a finalist decision match. on December 18, Tamura won the E-1 Climax by defeating Mitaro Fujita. On April 7, 2011, Tamura entered New Japan's Road to the Super Jr. 2Days Tournament B at Never.6, with the winner earning a spot in NJPW's Best of the Super Juniors. Tamura defeated Marines Mask II but lost to Tsuyoshi Kikuchi in the semi-final. On April 10, at Guts World, Tamura defeated Daisuke to win the GWC but would lose the title back to Daisuke on October 16. On October 1, Tamura unsuccessfully challenged Masashi Takeda for the Style-E Openweight Championship. From October 15 to December 17, Tamura teamed with Gentaro to participate in the SE Tag Tournament to crown the first Style-E Tag Team Champions but they lost in the semifinals to Ganbee Takanashi and Kenjiro Ohka. On December 3, following an injury to Daisuke, Tamura won the vacant GWC Championship by defeating Tatsuhiko Yoshino; he would lose the title to Guts Ishijima on May 12, 2012.

On December 15, 2012, at the final Style-E event, Tamura defeated Kenichiro Arai for his third and last Style-E Openweight Championship reign.

=== Pro Wrestling Heat Up (2013–present) ===
Following the closure of Style-E, Tamura announced the creation of his own promotion called Pro Wrestling Heat Up. The promotions first event took place on January 31, 2013, and saw in the main event Tamura teaming with Kenichiro Arai in a losing effort to Isami Kodaka and Yuko Miyamoto. On April 25, 2015, Tamura and Amigo Suzuki won the first Powerful Tag Tournament. On January 7, 2016, Tamura defeated Kenichiro Arai to become the first Heat Up Universal Championship. On March 19, Tamura and Mineo Fujita won the second Powerful Tag Tournament. On May 1, at Gatoh Move, Tamura and Kotori won the 4th Go-Go Green Curry Koppun Cup. On October 31, at Heat Up's biggest event ever at the Todoroki Arena, Tamura lost to Mixed martial arts pioneer Minoru Suzuki.On February 18, 2017, Tamura teamed with Fuminori Abe in the Powerful Tag Tournament, losing to Daisuke Kanehira and Hiroshi Kondo in the semi-finals. On May 5, at Gatoh Move, Tamura and Kotori won the 5th Go-Go Green Curry Koppun Cup.

On August 12, at Heat Up's first event at Korakuen Hall, Tamura made his sixth successful Heat Up Universal Championship defence against Daisuke Kanehira. On November 25, Tamura lost the Heat Up Universal Championship to Nori da Funky Shibiresasu. On March 10, 2018, Tamura reached the Powerful Tag Tournament with Mineo Fujita but lost to Daichi Kazato and Hiroshi Kondo. On June 23, Tamura teamed with New Japan legend and WWE Hall of Famer Tatsumi Fujinami to win the Heat Up Universal Tag Team Championships from Hide Kubota and Kenichiro Arai. On October 31, at Heat Up's biannual Todoroki Arena event, Tamura and Fujinami made their second successful title defence against Joji Otani and The Great Sasuke.

In 2018, Heat Up formed working relationships with Portuguese promotion Centro De Treinos De Wrestling and Britain's Pro Wrestling Live; this saw numerous foreign wrestlers coming to Heat Up and visa-versa. Tamura went on his first international tour in early December, winning the CTW Heavyweight Championship from Leo Rossi. Back in Japan, on December 26, Tamura lost the Burning King tournament to Tetsuhiro Kuroda.

=== All Japan Pro Wrestling (2016–present) ===
On January 2, 2016 he made his debut in AJPW teaming with Isami Kodaka and Yuko Miyamoto defeating Keiichi Sato, Yohei Nakajima and Yuma Aoyagi. On May 18, he formed the Axe Bombers with Takao Omori. Four days later, they were joined by Isami Kodaka and Yuko Miyamoto. On June 9, Tamura defeated Yohei Nakajima to win the Gaora TV Championship but he lost it back to Nakajima on June 15. In November, Tamura and Daichi Kazato (the newest member of Axe Bombers) finished the 2016 Jr. Tag Battle of Glory with 4 points.

== Championships and accomplishments ==
- All Japan Pro Wrestling
  - Gaora TV Championship (1 time)
- Centro de Treinos de Wrestling
  - CTW Heavyweight Championship (1 time)
- Daiwa Entertainment Pro Wrestling
  - DEP Tag Team Championship (1 time) – with Yusaku Ito
- Freelance Team Oita
  - FTO Independent Tag Team Championship (1 time) – with Naoshi Sano
- Gatoh Move Pro Wrestling
  - Go-Go Green Curry Koppun Cup (2016, 2017) – with Kotori
- Guts World Pro Wrestling
  - GWC Championship (2 times)
- Pro Wrestling Live
  - PWL World Championship (1 time)
- Pro Wrestling Heat Up
  - Heat Up Universal Championship (1 time)
  - Heat Up Universal Tag Team Championship (1 time) – with Tatsumi Fujinami
  - Powerful Tag Tournament (2015) – with Amigo Suzuki
  - Powerful Tag Tournament (2016) – with Mineo Fujita
- Pro Wrestling Illustrated
  - Ranked No. 418 of the top 500 singles wrestlers in the PWI 500 in 2019
- Style-E Pro Wrestling
  - Style-E Openweight Championship (3 times)
  - E-1 Climax (2010)
