= Jun Kasai =

Japanese professional wrestler

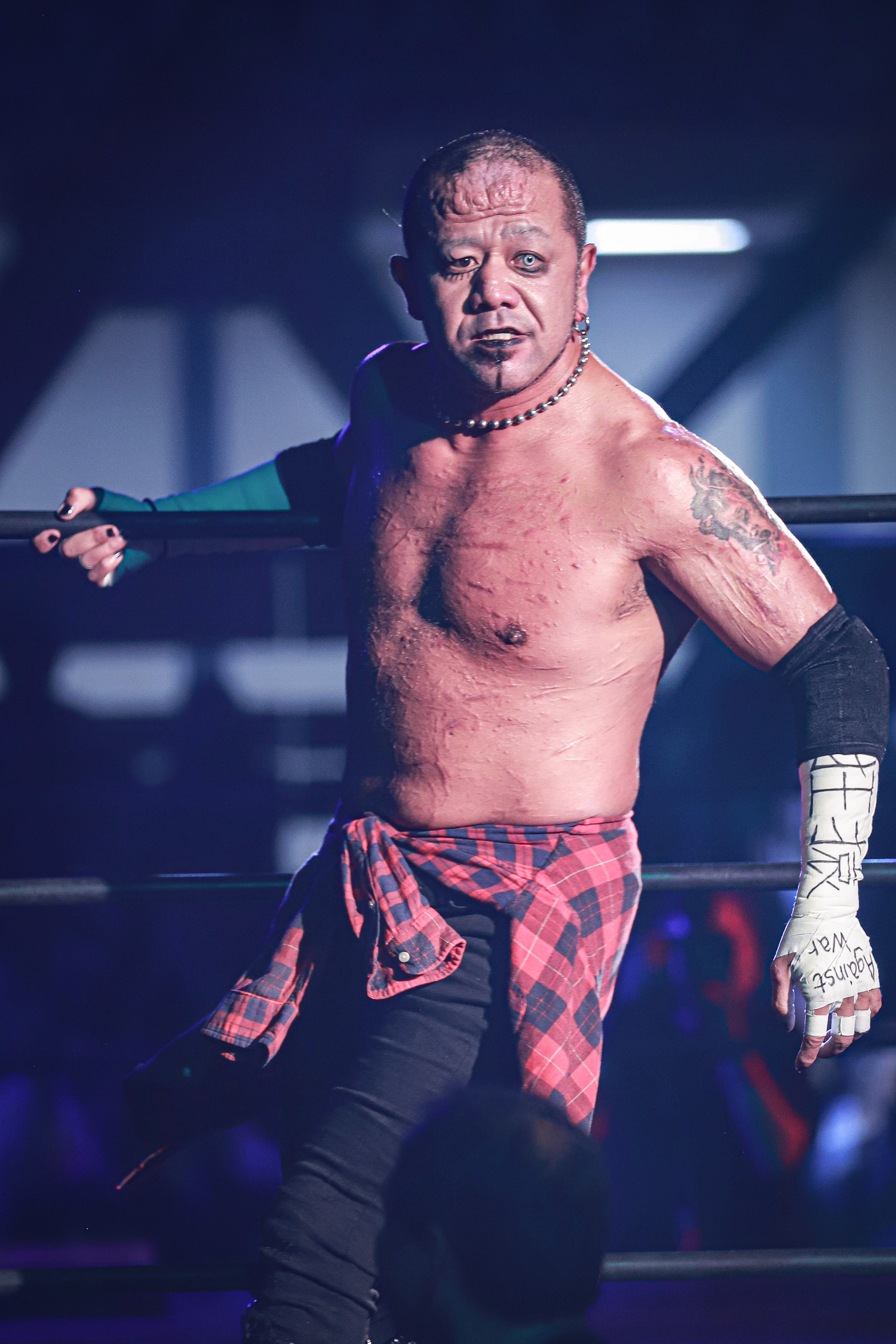
- Kasai in July 2023

Personal information
- Born: September 9, 1974 (age 52) Obihiro, Hokkaido, Japan
- Spouse: Michiyo Kasai
- Children: 2

Professional wrestling career
- Ring name(s): Jun Kasai; Crazy Monkey; Ape The Man; Junko Kasai; Nazo Fukumen KJ; Son Goku; Kuki Yoshitaka; X1112
- Billed height: 1.73 m (5 ft 8 in)
- Billed weight: 88 kg (194 lb)
- Billed from: Hiladelhia, America
- Debut: August 23, 1998

Jun Kasai (葛西 純, Kasai Jun) (born September 9, 1974) is a Japanese professional wrestler, primarily competing for Pro Wrestling Freedoms. Dubbed the Crazy Monkey (クレイジーモンキー, Kureijī Monkī) for his violent and often self-harmful style of hardcore wrestling, Kasai is considered a breakthrough talent in Japanese wrestling, able to work both hardcore and technical styles. Outside Freedoms, Kasai has worked for the original Pro Wrestling Zero-One, Hustle, Ice Ribbon, Combat Zone Wrestling (CZW) and Big Japan Pro Wrestling (BJW).

== Professional wrestling career ==
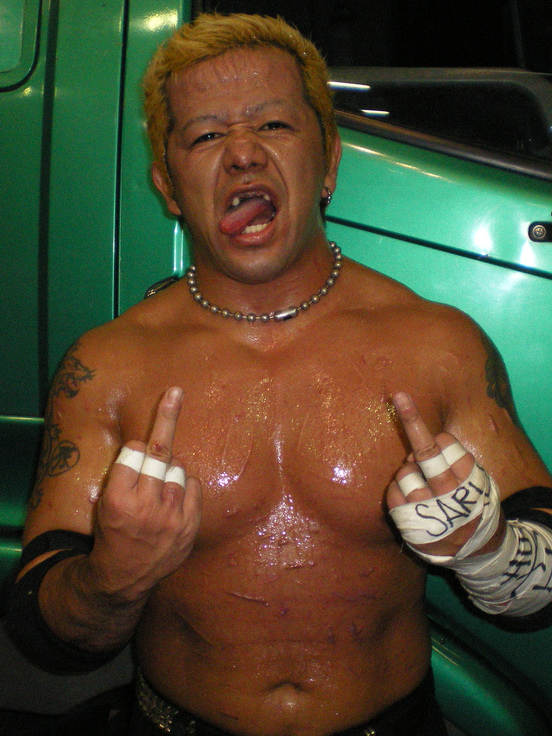
Kasai in 2007

In 1998, Kasai made his debut in a Big Japan Pro Wrestling (BJW) event in Osaka during the Deathmatch Wrestling boom of the late 90s. As BJW established a working relationship with American promotion Combat Zone Wrestling (CZW) at the turn of the millennium, Kasai joined the stable "CZW Warriors" (CZW Army) and feuded against the "BJW Warriors". Kasai formed the stable "Big Dealz" in 2001, with John Zandig, Nick Mondo, Wifebeater, Z-Barr and Trent Acid.

Since then Kasai has wrestled mainly for BJW and occasionally for other promotions such as Pro Wrestling Zero-One, K-Dojo and Apache Pro-Wrestling Army. Kasai's body is covered in scars, from all the hardcore wrestling he has done. This includes a Fans Bring the Weapons Match from the CZW show "Un F'n Believable", in which he took a bump onto a light tube board which ripped open his left elbow, exposing bone. In 2006 he won the first-ever IWA East Coast Masters of Pain after defeating Toby Klein, Mad Man Pondo and J. C. Bailey.

Kasai has participated five times in an extremely bloody "Razor Deathmatch"; a hardcore match where boards are fitted with many razor blades. The first of these deathmatches was held in 2005 with Jaki Numazawa, in which Jun took a powerbomb onto the razor bladed board. In the second one, held in 2008, Kasai's match was against the American wrestler Masada. On November 20, 2009, he defeated Ryuji Ito in another razor match after a double underhook facebuster on a cactus.

The fourth time was on April 5, 2010 where Kasai competed in a Barbwire Treaty Death Match that pitted Team CZW (Kasai, D. J. Hyde and Nick Gage) against Team BJW (Jaki Numazawa, Isami Kodaka and Masashi Takeda) in which a razor blade board was used in several bumps. On June 21, 2010 Kasai competed against the Necro Butcher in a Hardcore match for the Freedoms promotion; the razor blade board came into play mid way through the match.

In 2012, Kasai teamed regularly with American pro-wrestler/rapper One Man Kru. Together, they defeated the team of The Great Sasuke and Kesen Numajiro in a fluorescent light tubes death match at the September 9, 2012 Freedoms event in Iwate, Japan.

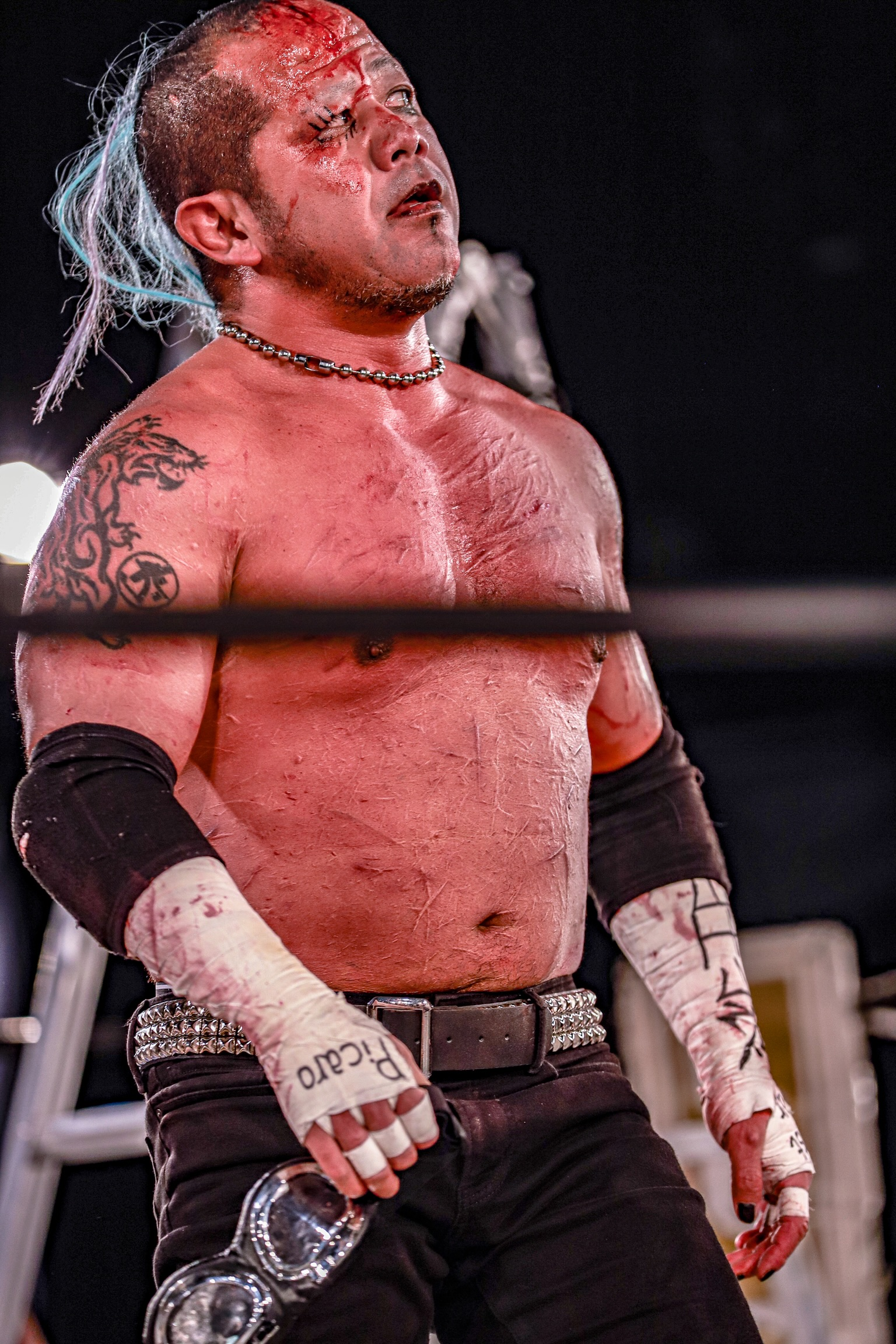
Kasai in April 2023

On January 3, 2021, Kasai defeated Yoshitatsu to win the All Japan Pro Wrestling's Gaora TV Championship.

On July 4, 2023 Kasai made his New Japan Pro Wrestling debut at Independence Day in a winning effort in the main event teaming with El Desperado against Jon Moxley and Homicide.

== Personal life ==
Kasai is married to his wife Michiyo; the couple have a daughter together. Kasai also has a son, Hinata, from a previous relationship. In July 2025, DDT Pro-Wrestling revealed Hinata had been training for them. He made his debut the following month at Wrestle Peter Pan 2025.

He was born in Hokkaido and now lives in the mainland, but claims on his official website that he is from "Hiladelhia, America" as a joke; he has described Philadelphia as his second homeland. While Kasai wrestled in the United States, he was a lodger in Matthew Prince, better known as the wrestler Wifebeater's house. He has described Prince as a real madman, unlike many deathmatch wrestlers who are in fact gentlemen outside the ring.

== Other media ==
Kasai is the subject of a documentary called Kyo-En. The documentary was released in 2021. In 2025, videogame creator Hideo Kojima praised the film.

== Championships and accomplishments ==
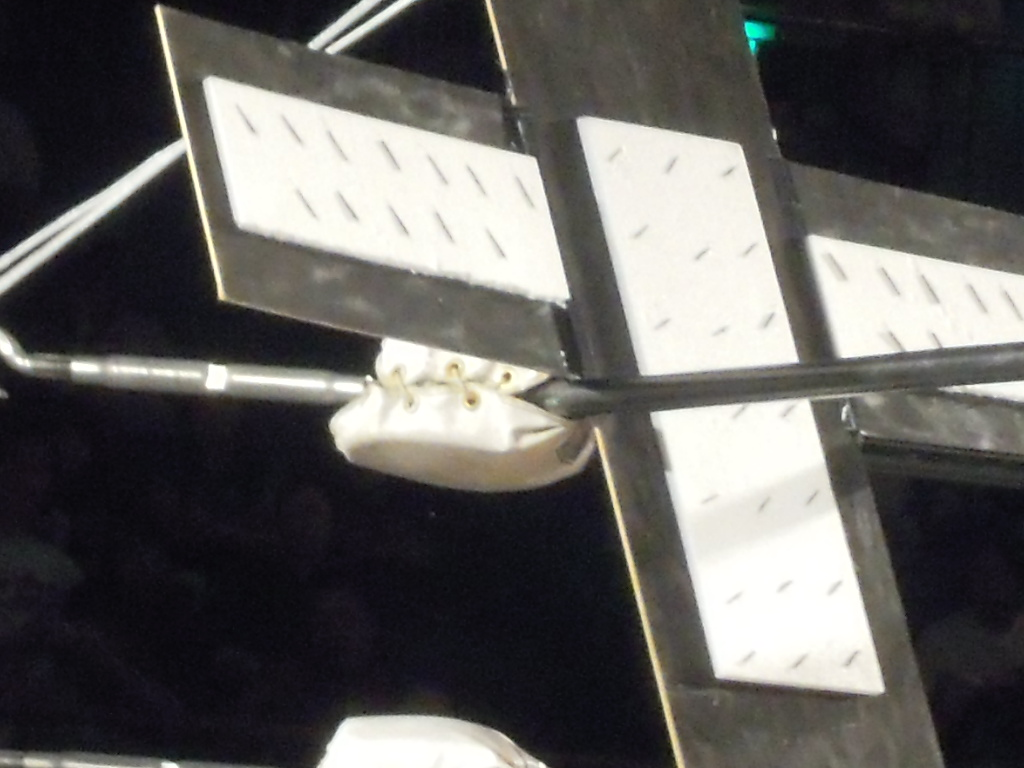
Since 2005, there have been "razor blade board" deathmatches in BJW, Apache Pro Wrestling and Freedoms, and all of them have involved Kasai.

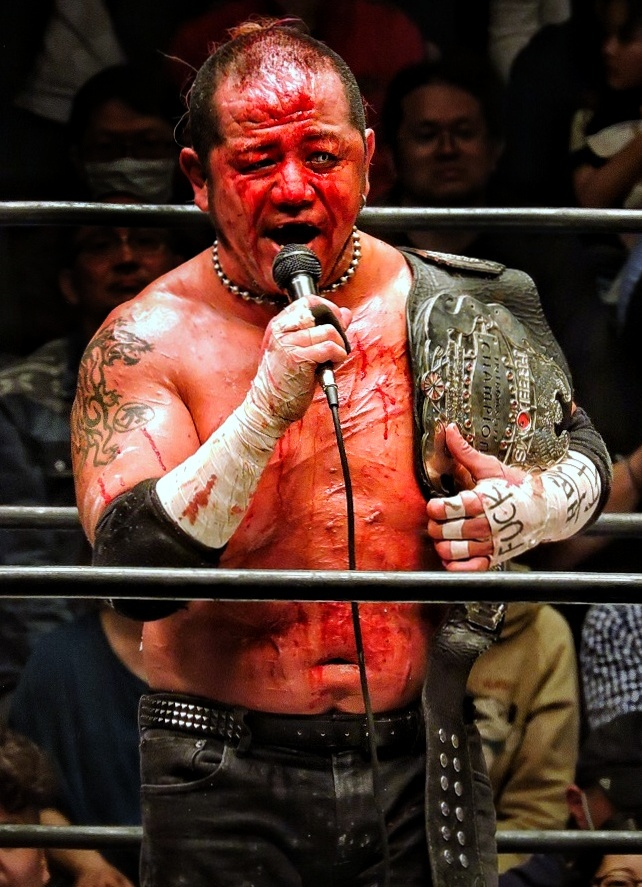
In Pro Wrestling Freedoms, Kasai is a former King of Freedom World Champion

- All Japan Pro Wrestling
  - Gaora TV Championship (1 time)
- Apache Pro-Wrestling Army
  - WEW World Tag Team Championship (2 times) – with Jaki Numazawa (1) and Tomoaki Honma (1)
- Big Japan Pro Wrestling
  - WEW Hardcore Tag Team Championship (1 time) – with The W*NGer
  - BJW Tag Team Championship (3 times) – with Jaki Numazawa
- Combat Zone Wrestling
  - CZW Ultraviolent Underground Championship (1 time)
  - CZW World Junior Heavyweight Championship (1 time)
  - CZW World Tag Team Championship (1 time) – with Men's Teioh
  - CZW Tournament of Death (2014)
- DDT Pro-Wrestling
  - DDT Extreme Championship (1 time)
- Dove Pro Wrestling
  - Dove Tag Team Championship (1 time) – with Gunso
- Japan Indie Awards
  - Best Bout Award (2009) vs. Ryuji Ito on November 20
- Ice Ribbon
  - International Ribbon Tag Team Championship (1 time) – with Miyako Matsumoto
- IWA East Coast
  - Masters of Pain (2006)
- Pro Wrestling Freedoms
  - King of Freedom World Championship (5 times)
  - King of Freedom World Tag Team Championship (2 times) – with Masashi Takeda (1) and Mizuki Watase (1)
- Pro Wrestling Illustrated
  - Ranked No. 208 of the top 500 singles wrestlers in the PWI 500 in 2026
- Pro Wrestling Zero1
  - Zero1 Royal Rumble
- Tokyo Sports
  - Match of the Year Award (2009) vs. Ryuji Ito on November 20
- Wrestle-1
  - UWA World Trios Championship (1 time) – with Nosawa Rongai and Shuji Kondo
  - Wrestle-1 Tag Team Championship (2 times) – with Manabu Soya
