= Apache Pro-Wrestling Army =

Japanese professional wrestling promotion

- Acronym: Apache Pro
- Founded: 2004
- Defunct: December 25, 2016
- Headquarters: Tokyo, Japan
- Founder(s): Go Ito; Kintaro Kanemura
- Owner(s): Go Ito and Kintaro Kanemura (2004–2008); Takashi Sasaki (2008–2009); Kintaro Kanemura and Tetsuhiro Kuroda (2010–2016)
- Predecessor: World Entertainment Wrestling; Fuyuki-Gun Promotion
- Successor: Xtreme Wrestling Force; Pro Wrestling Freedoms; Pro-Wrestling A-Team

Apache Pro-Wrestling Army (アパッチプロレス軍, Apatchi Puroresu-gun) was a Japanese professional wrestling promotion operating from 2004 to 2009 and from 2010 to 2016.

== History ==
Following the closure of Frontier Martial-Arts Wrestling (FMW) in 2002, FMW booker Hiromichi Fuyuki formed his own promotion, which ran under the names World Entertainment Wrestling (WEW) and Fuyuki-Gun Promotion (originally used by Fuyuki for an FMW-aligned venture following his withdrawal from WAR), and administered the WEW singles and tag team championships originally created in FMW in 1999. FMW alumni such as Kintaro Kanemura, Tetsuhiro Kuroda, and Go Ito maintained Fuyuki-Gun Promotion and WEW even after Fuyuki's death in March 2003, but stopped in May 2004.

Apache Pro-Wrestling Army (Apache Pro) was founded by Ito and Kanemura in 2004 as a replacement for Fuyuki-Gun Promotion and WEW. Their first event was on August 30, the main event was a six-man tag team match which had Ichiro Yaguchi, Riki Choshu, and Tomohiro Ishii defeating BADBOY Hido, Dick Togo, and Kanemura.

The first WEW Heavyweight Champion under Apache Pro was Togi Makabe. On August 1, 2006, Apache Pro would hold a tournament to see which tag team would become the first WEW World Tag Team Champions under the promotion. In the finals, BADBOY Hido and Takashi Sasaki defeated Jun Kasai and Tetsuhiro Kuroda. In 2006, The Winger would win Apache Pro's first and only Death Match Tournament. In 2007, Takashi Sasaki and The Winger would win the Interim WEW Tag Team Title Tournament. In 2008, Kanemura was involved in a sexual harassment scandal with a female office worker from Big Japan Pro Wrestling. After the scandal, Kanemura departed Apache Pro. Kanemura would form a new promotion called the Xtreme Wrestling Force (XWF). XWF ceased running shows in 2010.

Apache Pro closed on June 26, 2009, after which its owner Takashi Sasaki founded Pro Wrestling Freedoms. On December 27, 2010, Kanemura and Kuroda started to promote Apache Pro shows again, this time basing the promotion around Osaka. The promotion lasted until Christmas 2016, when it closed for a final time due to Kanemura's retirement from active competition. After Apache Pro's closure, Tomohiko Hashimoto launched a new offshoot promotion Pro-Wrestling A-Team, which continues to promote the WEW championships as of 2025.

== Roster at the time of closure ==
=== Wrestlers ===
Apache Army

- Kintaro Kanemura
- Tetsuhiro Kuroda

Demolition

- Tomohiko Hashimoto

=== Staff ===
- Hasegawa (General Manager)
- Takafumi Fujioka (Announcer)

== Alumni ==
- Jushin Thunder Liger
- Keiji Takayama
- Mad Man Pondo
- Masada
- Masato Tanaka
- Necro Butcher
- Riki Choshu
- Ricky Fuji
- Shigeki Sato
- Shoji Akiyoshi
- Taka Michinoku
- Takashi Sasaki
- The Winger
- Apache Kosakai
- Kenichi Yamamoto
- Rikimaru
- Shinjuku Shark
- Tomohiro Waki
- One Man Kru

== Championships ==
| Championship | Final recognized champion(s) | Date won |
|---|---|---|
| WEW Heavyweight Championship | Kintaro Kanemura | December 25, 2016 |
| WEW Tag Team Championship | Tatsuhito Takaiwa and Tetsuhiro Kuroda | December 25, 2016 |
| Apache Opendivision Championship | Tsuyoshi Kikuchi | April 28, 2011 |

== See also ==
- List of professional wrestling promotions in Japan
