= Yoshihito Sasaki =

Japanese wrestler (born 1982)

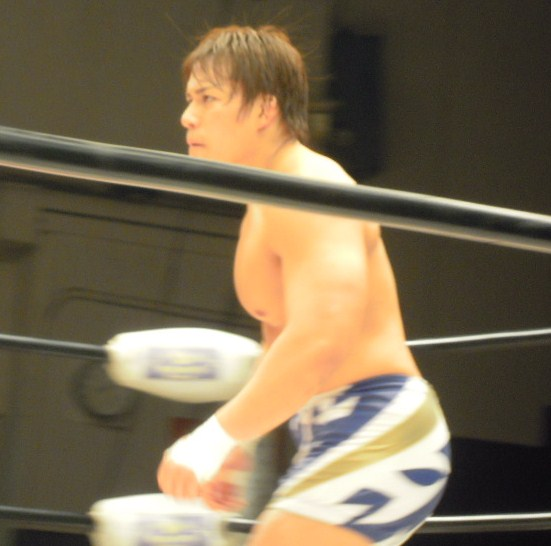
- Sasaki in June 2010

Personal information
- Born: March 12, 1982 (age 44) Kawaguchi, Japan

Professional wrestling career
- Ring name(s): Brahman Yoshihito; Hecate Yoshihito; Macbeth Sasaki; Yoshihito Sasaki
- Billed height: 1.74 m (5 ft 9 in)
- Billed weight: 96 kg (212 lb)
- Trained by: Animal Hamaguchi; Masato Tanaka; Tatsuhito Takaiwa
- Debut: 2000
- Retired: 2013

Yoshihito Sasaki (佐々木義人, Sasaki Yoshihito) is a retired Japanese professional wrestler, best known for his time with the Japanese professional wrestling promotions Big Japan Pro Wrestling (BJW) and Pro Wrestling Zero1 (Zero1).

== Professional wrestling career ==
=== Independent circuit (2001–2013) ===
Sasaki made his professional wrestling debut for Frontier Martial-Arts Wrestling, competing at one of the promotion's biggest shows, the FMW 12th Anniversary Show which took place on May 5, 2001, where he teamed up with Tomokazu Morita in a losing effort to Ricky Fuji and Satoru Makita. He also competed in Onita Pro Wrestling, a promotion created by Atsushi Onita at a house show from June 23, 2002, where he teamed up with Masato Tanaka in a losing effort to Kintaro Kanemura and Tetsuhiro Kuroda. Sasaki worked a match for New Japan Pro-Wrestling, at NJPW Lock Up from February 24, 2008, where he teamed up with Tengu Kaiser, falling short to Great Bash Heel (Togi Makabe and Toru Yano). He even made an appearance in the joshi puroresu promotion Oz Academy, at the 15th Anniversary of it, where he teamed up with Ryuji Ito and Shinya Ishikawa to defeat Daisuke Sekimoto, Kazuki Hashimoto and Yuji Okabayashi. Sasaki worked in a couple of matches for All Japan Pro Wrestling, first one at AJPW 40th Anniversary on February 3, 2012, where he teamed up with Strong BJ (Daisuke Sekimoto and Yuji Okabayashi), scoring a defeat against S.M.O.P. (Akebono and Ryota Hama), and Keiji Muto. The second one was at AJPW New Year Shining Series 2013 on January 26, where he unsuccessfully challenged Manabu Soya for the BJW World Strong Heavyweight Championship. Sasaki also worked for Pro Wrestling Noah, participating on the fourth night of the NOAH Summer Navigation 2013, event which portraited the 15th Anniversary of Naomichi Marufuji's career, where he teamed up with Shinya Ishikawa to unsuccessfully challenge TMDK (Mikey Nicholls and Shane Haste) for the GHC Tag Team Championship.

==== Big Japan Pro Wrestling (2009–2013) ====
Sasaki participated several times in the Saikyo Tag League, making his first appearance on the 2009 edition of the event, teaming up with Shinya Ishikawa, placing themselves in the Block B and scoring a total of four points after facing the teams of Masashi Takeda and Isami Kodaka, Yuko Miyamoto and Takashi Sasaki, Jun Kasai and Jaki Numazawa, and Katsumasa Inoue and Kankuro Hoshino. His last appearance was on the 2013 edition, where he teamed up with Ryuji Ito in the Block B, scoring a total of two points against the teams of Yuko Miyamoto and Isami Kodaka, Speed of Sounds (Tsutomu Oosugi and Hercules Senga), The Brahman Brothers (Brahman Shu and Brahman Kei), The Irish Airborne (Dave Crist and Jake Crist), and Shinya Ishikawa and Madoka. He participated in one of the longest matches in professional wrestling history, a 108-man battle royal at Tenka Sanbun no Kei: New Year's Eve Special, a cross-over event held between Big Japan Pro Wrestling, DDT and Kaientai Dojo from December 31, 2009, competing against other infamous wrestlers such as Great Kojika, Taka Michinoku, Kenny Omega, Poison Sawada Julie, and the winner of the match, Jun Kasai.

==== Combat Zone Wrestling (2011–2012) ====
Sasaki worked in cross-over events held between Combat Zone Wrestling (CZW) in partnership with other promotions. At wXw/CZW/BJW Triangle Of Ultraviolence from October 3, 2011, he unsuccessfully challenged Big Van Walter for the wXw Unified World Wrestling Championship. Sasaki worked in another cross-over event held by CZW, BJW, DDT, Kaientai Dojo and Freedoms, the Indie Wrestling Summit from December 3, 2011, where he unsuccessfully challenged Sami Callihan for the CZW World Junior Heavyweight Championship. At CZW Cage of Death XIII, Sasaki teamed up with Jaki Numazawa, Jun Kasai, Kamui and Masahiro Takanashi in a losing effort to Danshoku Dino, Kengo Mashimo, Kudo, Ryuji Ito and Takashi Sasaki.

==== Pro Wrestling Zero1 (2002–2008) ====
Sasaki started his long tenure with Pro Wrestling Zero1 at ZERO-ONE Genesis 2002, show from April 27, where he fell short to Naohiro Hoshikawa. He participated in the 2007 edition of the Fire Festival, placing himself in the Block B, finishing with a total of two points after going against Masato Tanaka, Kohei Sato, Daisuke Sekimoto and Takao Omori.

==== Westside Xtreme Wrestling (2011–2012) ====
Sasaki worked for a brief period of time for the German promotion Westside Xtreme Wrestling (wXw). He competed in the wXw 16 Carat Gold Tournament of 2012, facing Bad Bones successfully on the first night on March 2 in a first-round match. On the second night of the event, he fell short to Zack Sabre Jr. in a quarter-final match. Despite getting eliminated from the tournament, he competed in one last elimination tag team match on the third night, where he teamed up with Alexander Wolfe, Robert Dreissker and Karsten Beck in a losing effort to Big Van Walter, Daisuke Sekimoto, Kim Ray and 2Face. Sasaki also took part in a series of cross-over events promoted by Westside Xtreme Wrestling in partnership with Combat Zone Wrestling and Big Japan Pro Wrestling named World Triangle Night, first of them being the BJW World Triangle Night In Osaka, where he teamed up with Shinya Ishikawa in a losing effort to Big Van Walter and Robert Dreissker. The next one was the BJW World Triangle Night In Korakuen from July 30, 2012, where he teamed up with Bad Bones and Shinya Ishikawa to defeat Alexander Wolfe and Strong BJ (Daisuke Sekimoto and Yuji Okabayashi) in a six-man tag team match. The last one was the BJW World Triangle Night In Nagoya, where he teamed up with Shinobu Sugawara to defeat MK McKinnan and Trent Seven.

== Championships and accomplishments ==
- Big Japan Pro Wrestling
  - BJW World Strong Heavyweight Championship (1 time, inaugural)
  - BJW Tag Team Championship (4 times) - with Shinobu (1), Daisuke Sekimoto (2) and Shinya Ishikawa (1)
  - Ikkitousen Strong Climb (2012)
- Pro Wrestling Zero1
  - Zero-One Tenka-ichi (World's Best) Junior Heavyweight Championship (1 time)
  - United National Heavyweight Championship (2 times)
  - Tenkaichi Junior (2005)
  - Lion King Cup (2003)
- Pro Wrestling Illustrated
  - Ranked No. 242 of the top 500 singles wrestlers in the PWI 500 in 2013
