= Judgement 2010 =

2010 DDT Pro-Wrestling event

- Promotion: DDT Pro-Wrestling
- Date: March 14, 2010
- City: Tokyo, Japan
- Venue: Korakuen Hall
- Attendance: 1,504

Judgement chronology
← Previous; 2009	Next → 2011

Judgement 2010 was a professional wrestling event promoted by DDT Pro-Wrestling (DDT). It took place on March 14, 2010, in Tokyo, Japan, at the Korakuen Hall. It was the fourteenth event under the Judgement name. The event aired domestically on Fighting TV Samurai.

== Storylines ==
Judgement 2010 featured six professional wrestling matches that involved different wrestlers from pre-existing scripted feuds and storylines. Wrestlers portrayed villains, heroes, or less distinguishable characters in the scripted events that built tension and culminated in a wrestling match or series of matches.

== Event ==
The first match was Kazuki Hirata's DDT debut in which he failed to defend the Ironman Heavymetalweight Championship against Keisuke Ishii.

The third match was the "Tiger Toguchi Challenge Handicap Match" where he and Hoshitango took on the team of Tomomitsu Matsunaga, Gota Ihashi and Soma Takao.

In the next match, Harashima faced Togi Makabe from New Japan Pro-Wrestling.

Next was the "KO-D Openweight Championship Contendership & Right To Challenge Anytime, Anywhere + α Contention Rumble", a Rumble rules match in which the winner would receive a title match against the KO-D Openweight Champion on April 4 at a Shinjuku Face live event. Additionally, five envelopes were suspended above the ring. Each envelope had a symbol printed on it (Clubs, Hearts, Spades, Diamonds or Skull and Crossbones) and contained a prize. The prizes included a one-day date with joshi wrestler Yuiga, a one-day date with idol and model Aika Ando, a one-year DDT contract, the right to become DDT's CEO and the Right To Challenge Anytime, Anywhere contract, giving the right to their holder to challenge for any title at any moment in the next year. Whenever someone grabbed an envelope, all the participants still in the match had to freeze until the prize that had just been won was announced. Failing to do so resulted in a disqualification. Grabbing an envelope also resulted in being eliminated from the match.

== Results ==
No.	Results	Stipulations	Times
1	Keisuke Ishii defeated Kazuki Hirata (c)	Singles match for the Ironman Heavymetalweight Championship	06:40
2	Mikami, "Showa" and "Showa"-ko defeated Poison Sawada Julie, Exciting Yoshida and Yuki Miyazaki	Six-man tag team match	08:47
3	Tiger Toguchi and Hoshitango defeated Tomomitsu Matsunaga, Gota Ihashi and Soma Takao	Two-on-three handicap match	07:09
4	Togi Makabe defeated Harashima	Singles match	16:18
5	Masa Takanashi won by last eliminating Antonio Honda	KO-D Openweight Championship Contendership & Right To Challenge Anytime, Anywhere + α Contention Rumble	23:05
6	Daisuke Sekimoto (c) defeated Sanshiro Takagi	Singles match for the KO-D Openweight Championship	22:28
(c) / – the champion(s) heading into the match

KO-D Openweight Championship Contendership & Right To Challenge Anytime, Anywhere + α Contention Rumble

Order	Name	Order eliminated	By	Time
1	Hikaru Sato	2	Grabbing the Hearts Envelope (Note: Sato won the right to date Aika Ando for one day.)	06:11
2	Munenori Sawa	4	Disqualification (moved)	11:40
3	Abnormal	1	Disqualification (didn't enter the ring)	02:00
4	Antonio Honda	14	Masa Takanashi	23:05
5	Kudo	11	Masa Takanashi	19:28
6	Danshoku Dino	7	Disqualification (moved)	15:24
7	Toru Owashi	9	Grabbing the Clubs Envelope (Note: Owashi won the right to date Yuiga for one day.)	17:30
8	Yukihiro Abe	5	Francesco Togo	13:05
9	Masa Takanashi	—	—	Winner
10	Yago Aznable	3	Grabbing the Spades Envelope (Note: Aznable won a one year DDT contract.)	11:35
11	Sasaki and Gabbana	8	Disqualification (moved)	15:24
12	Francesco Togo	12	Masa Takanashi	21:14
13	Yasu Urano	13	Masa Takanashi	22:00
14	Michael Nakazawa	6	Grabbing the Diamonds Envelope (Note: Nakazawa won the right to be the CEO of DDT.)	15:21
15	Ken Ohka	10	Grabbing the Skull and Crossbones Envelope (Note: Ohka won the Right To Challenge Anytime, Anywhere contract.)	17:30
