= Into The Fight 2023 =

2023 DDT Pro-Wrestling event

- Promotional poster featuring Harashima (top) and Yukio Naya (bottom)
- Promotion: CyberFight
- Brand: DDT Pro-Wrestling
- Date: February 26, 2023
- City: Tokyo, Japan
- Venue: Korakuen Hall
- Attendance: 680
- Tagline: Prove myself that I'm the heart of DDT / I will become the strongest in DDT

Event chronology
← Previous; Sweet Dreams! 2023	Next → Judgement 2023

Into The Fight chronology
← Previous; 2021	Next → 2024

Into The Fight 2023 was a professional wrestling event promoted by DDT Pro-Wrestling (DDT). It took place on February 26, 2023, in Tokyo, Japan, at Korakuen Hall. The event aired live on Fighting TV Samurai and on DDT's streaming service Wrestle Universe.

Nine matches were contested at the event, including two on the pre-show, and two of DDT's nine championships were on the line. The main event saw Yukio Naya defeat Harashima to become the number one contender to the KO-D Openweight Championship. Other prominent matches included Shinya Aoki, Yuki Ueno and Super Sasadango Machine defeat Burning (Tetsuya Endo, Kotaro Suzuki and Yusuke Okada) to win the KO-D 6-Man Tag Team Championship, and Takeshi Masada defeated Yuya Koroku to win the inaugural D Generations Cup.

== Background ==
Into The Fight is an event held each year since 2005 (except in 2006 and 2022) at Korakuen Hall (except the 2015 edition which was held at Shinjuku Face). The 2023 edition was the seventeenth event under that name.

== Storylines ==
The show featured nine professional wrestling matches that resulted from scripted storylines, where wrestlers portrayed villains, heroes, or less distinguishable characters in the scripted events that built tension and culminated in a wrestling match or series of matches.

=== Event ===
The first seven matches of the show were broadcast on DDT's YouTube channel. In the first one, Damnation T.A (MJ Paul and Kanon) picked up a win over Masahiro Takanashi and Antonio Honda by submission. Next, the bout between Pheromones (Yuki "Sexy" Iino and Danshoku "Dandy" Dino) and Toru Owashi, Gota Ihashi, Saki Akai, Kazuki Hirata, and Bonnō Dai Shachō (Sanshiro Takagi and Fuminori Abe) ended in a no contest after referee stoppage. Next up, Keigo Nakamura, Toui Kojima and Kazuma Sumi defeated Hideki Okatani, Yuki Ishida and Illusion by pinfall in six-man tag team action. The fourth bout saw Kazusada Higuchi and Shishamo Power outmatching Jun Akiyama and Unagi Mask in tag team action. In the fifth match, Kip Sabian, Chris Brookes and Hagane Shinno defeated Omega (Yuji Hino and Makoto Oishi) and DDT Universal Champion Naruki Doi. After the match, Sabian pinned Penelope Ford who accompanied his team at ringside to strip her off the Ironman Heavymetalweight Championship. Next up, Takeshi Masada defeated Yuya Koroku to become the first-ever D Generations Cup Champion. The seventh bout saw Shinya Aoki, Yuki Ueno and Super Sasadango Machine defeating Burning (Tetsuya Endo, Kotaro Suzuki and Yusuke Okada) to win the KO-D 6-Man Tag Team Championship. After the match, Kip Sabian dropped the Ironman Heavymetalweight Championship to Yoshihiko. In the semi main event, ShunMao (Mao and Shunma Katsumata) defeated Yukio Sakaguchi and Hikaru Machida to secure their third consecutive defense over the KO-D Tag Team Championship.

In the main event, Yukio Naya defeated Harashima to become the number one contender to the KO-D Openweight Championship.

== Results ==
No.	Results	Stipulations	Times
1^{P}	Damnation T.A (MJ Paul and Kanon) defeated Masahiro Takanashi and Antonio Honda by submission	Tag team match	5:08
2^{P}	Pheromones (Yuki "Sexy" Iino and Danshoku "Dandy" Dino) vs. Toru Owashi, Gota Ihashi, Saki Akai, Kazuki Hirata, and Bonnō Dai Shachō (Sanshiro Takagi and Fuminori Abe) ended in a no contest	6-on-2 Handicap match	8:52
3	Keigo Nakamura, Toui Kojima and Kazuma Sumi defeated Hideki Okatani, Yuki Ishida and Ilusion by pinfall	Six-man tag team match	7:54
4	Kazusada Higuchi and Shishamo Power defeated Jun Akiyama and Unagi Mask by pinfall	Tag team match	7:47
5	Kip Sabian, Chris Brookes and Hagane Shinno (with Penelope Ford) defeated Omega (Yuji Hino and Makoto Oishi) and Naruki Doi by pinfall	Six-man tag team match	10:23
6	Takeshi Masada defeated Yuya Koroku by pinfall	D Generations Cup Final	8:26
7	Shinya Aoki, Yuki Ueno and Super Sasadango Machine defeated Burning (Tetsuya Endo, Kotaro Suzuki and Yusuke Okada) (c) by pinfall	Six-man tag team match for the KO-D 6-Man Tag Team Championship	13:08
8	ShunMao (Mao and Shunma Katsumata) (c) defeated Yukio Sakaguchi and Hikaru Machida by pinfall	Tag team match for the KO-D Tag Team Championship	14:22
9	Yukio Naya defeated Harashima by pinfall	Singles match to determine the #1 contender to the KO-D Openweight Championship	17:55
(c) / – the champion(s) heading into the match; P / – the match was broadcast on the pre-show
