= Judgement 2015 =

2015 DDT Pro-Wrestling event

- Promotion: DDT Pro-Wrestling
- Date: March 29, 2015
- City: Tokyo, Japan
- Venue: Korakuen Hall
- Attendance: 2,200

Event chronology
← Previous; Never Mind 2014	Next → Peter Pan 2015

Judgement chronology
← Previous; 2014	Next → 2016

Judgement 2015 was a professional wrestling event promoted by DDT Pro-Wrestling (DDT). It took place on March 29, 2015, in Tokyo, Japan, at the Korakuen Hall. It was the nineteenth event under the Judgement name. The event aired domestically on Fighting TV Samurai.

== Storylines ==
Judgement 2015 featured seven professional wrestling matches that involved different wrestlers from pre-existing scripted feuds and storylines. Wrestlers portrayed villains, heroes, or less distinguishable characters in the scripted events that built tension and culminated in a wrestling match or series of matches.

== Event ==
The dark match was a King of Dark Championship match between Gorgeous Matsuno and Gota Ihashi. Per the rules of the championship, losing the match caused Ihashi to retain the title.

The third match of the main card was a Falls Count Anywhere match celebrating Sanshiro Takagi's 20 year professional wrestling career. Takagi teamed with Jun Kasai from the hardcore promotion Pro-Wrestling Freedoms.

Next Akito faced X = Shiori Asahi from Kaientai Dojo in the "10-minute Fall Count match", a 10-minute Iron man match in which instead of scoring one point for each pinfall, participants scored a point for each count the referee made during pinfalls (one-counts were worth one point, two-counts were worth two points, etc). The time limit expired while Akito and Asahi were tied 17-17, leading to the referee continuing the match in sudden death overtime. Akito scored a final one-count to win the match 18-17.

The Right To Challenge Anytime, Anywhere Contract Battle Royal was a Rumble rules match for a KO-D Openweight Championship match at Max Bump 2015, on April 29. Six envelopes were suspended above the ring, four of which contained a "Right To Challenge Anytime, Anywhere" contract, giving the right to their holder to challenge any champion at any time in the following year. One envelope contained a "Right To Challenge the King of Dark" contract and the last envelope contained a worthless "Right To Perform Anytime, Anywhere" contract. Grabbing a contract resulted in being eliminated from the match.

In the main event, Strong BJ (Daisuke Sekimoto and Yuji Okabayashi) from Big Japan Pro-Wrestling defended the KO-D Tag Team Championship against Danshoku Dino and Super Sasadango Machine.

== Results ==
No.	Results	Stipulations	Times
1^{D}	Gorgeous Matsuno defeated Gota Ihashi (c) by submission	Singles match for the King of Dark Championship	04:09
2	Hoshitango and Toru Owashi defeated Mikami and Shunma Katsumata	Tag team match	07:49
3	Team Dream Futures (Keisuke Ishii and Shigehiro Irie) defeated Shuten-dōji (Kudo and Yukio Sakaguchi)	Tag team match for #1 contendership to the KO-D Tag Team Championship	10:10
4	Sanshiro Takagi and Jun Kasai defeated Golden☆Storm Riders (Kota Ibushi and Suguru Miyatake)	Falls Count Anywhere tag team match	14:40
5	Akito defeated X = Shiori Asahi (c) 18-17 in sudden death overtime	10-minute Total Count match for the DDT Extreme Championship	11:32
6	Harashima won by last eliminating Konosuke Takeshita	Right To Challenge Anytime, Anywhere Contract Battle Royal	23:35
7	Strong BJ (Daisuke Sekimoto and Yuji Okabayashi) (c) defeated Danshoku Dino and Super Sasadango Machine	Tag team match for the KO-D Tag Team Championship	16:10
(c) / – the champion(s) heading into the match; D / – this was a dark match

Right To Challenge Anytime, Anywhere Contract Battle Royal

Order	Name	Order eliminated	By	Time
1	Konosuke Takeshita	14	Harashima	23:35
2	Tetsuya Endo	2	Grabbing a contract (Note: Endo won the "Right To Challenge the King of Dark" contract.)	08:21
3	Yasu Urano	3	Grabbing a contract	08:21
4	Makoto Oishi	1	Hiroshi Fukuda	06:56
5	Tomomitsu Matsunaga	6	Kazusada Higuchi	11:53
6	DJ Nira	7	Kazusada Higuchi	12:08
7	Kouki Iwasaki	4	Harashima	09:07
8	Hiroshi Fukuda	8	Grabbing a contract	13:02
9	Masa Takanashi	5	Grabbing a contract (Note: Takanashi won the "Right To Perform Anytime, Anywhere" contract.)	11:13
10	Harashima	—	—	Winner
11	Daisuke Sasaki	11	Kazusada Higuchi	15:03
12	Soma Takao	10	Kazusada Higuchi	14:59
13	Kazusada Higuchi	12	Grabbing a contract	15:24
14	Kazuki Hirata	9	Kazusada Higuchi	14:04
15	Antonio Honda	13	Grabbing a contract	17:16
