= Judgement 2011 =

2011 DDT Pro-Wrestling event

- Promotion: DDT Pro-Wrestling
- Date: March 27, 2011
- City: Tokyo, Japan
- Venue: Korakuen Hall
- Attendance: 1,518

Judgement chronology
← Previous; 2010	Next → 2012

Judgement 2011 was a professional wrestling event promoted by DDT Pro-Wrestling (DDT). It took place on March 27, 2011, in Tokyo, Japan, at the Korakuen Hall. It was the fifteenth event under the Judgement name. The event aired domestically on Fighting TV Samurai.

== Storylines ==
Judgement 2011 featured six professional wrestling matches that involved different wrestlers from pre-existing scripted feuds and storylines. Wrestlers portrayed villains, heroes, or less distinguishable characters in the scripted events that built tension and culminated in a wrestling match or series of matches.

== Event ==
In the second match dubbed "14th Anniversary Memorial Match", Sanshiro Takagi and Mitsuya Nagai represented Jakai Tensho, Poison Sawada Julie's "Serpent Council" stable, by wrestling respectively as Sanshiro Dokumamushi (毒(ドク)蝮(まむし)三四郎, Dokumamushi Sanshirō; "Venomous Viper Sanshiro") and Mitsuya Jagai (蛇(ジャ)我(ガ)井(い)満也, Jagai Mitsuya; "Snake Pit Mitsuya").

The fourth match was the first stage in a series dubbed "Bob Sapp's Games" where Sapp would send surprise "assassins" to try and take out Danshoku Dino before their match on July 24, at Ryōgoku Peter Pan 2011. The first "assassin" was Jonathan Gresham who made his first and only DDT appearance.

Next was the "KO-D Openweight Championship Contendership + α Right To Challenge Anytime, Anywhere Contract Royal Rumble", a Rumble rules match in which the winner would receive a title match against the KO-D Openweight Champion on May 5, at Max Bump 2011. Additionally, two envelopes were suspended above the ring. Each envelope contained a Right To Challenge Anytime, Anywhere contract, giving their holder the right to challenge for any title at any moment in the next year. Grabbing an envelope resulted in being eliminated from the match.

== Results ==
No.	Results	Stipulations	Times
1	Hikaru Sato, Thanomsak Toba and Rion Mizuki defeated Tsunehito Naito, Akito and Kazuki Hirata	Six-man tag team match	10:34
2	Mikami and Rojo del Sol defeated Jakai Tensho (Sanshiro Dokumamushi and Mitsuya Jagai) (with Poison Sawada Julie and Naomi Susan)	Tag team match	04:10
3	Harashima defeated Antonio Honda	Singles match	09:03
4	Danshoku Dino defeated Jonathan Gresham	Singles match	08:50
5	Shuji Ishikawa won by last eliminating Kudo	KO-D Openweight Championship Contendership + α Right To Challenge Anytime, Anywhere Contract Royal Rumble	29:39
6	Dick Togo (c) defeated Kota Ibushi	Singles match for the KO-D Openweight Championship	36:57
(c) / – the champion(s) heading into the match

KO-D Openweight Championship Contendership + α Right To Challenge Anytime, Anywhere Contract Royal Rumble

Order	Name	Order eliminated	By	Time
1	Seiya Morohashi	5	Kenny Omega	16:20
2	Minoru Fujita	1	Michael Nakazawa	11:20
3	Yasu Urano	8	Kudo	21:07
4	Michael Nakazawa	9	Shuji Ishikawa	21:57
5	Hoshitango	3	Gentaro	13:20
6	Soma Takao	2	Grabbing a contract	12:02
7	Kudo	16	Shuji Ishikawa	29:39
8	Tomomitsu Matsunaga	7	Yasu Urano	19:58
9	Ken Ohka	4	Daisuke Sasaki and Gentaro	14:36
10	Gentaro	6	Grabbing a contract	19:40
11	Daisuke Sasaki	11	Shuji Ishikawa	22:43
12	Kenny Omega	15	Kudo	27:33
13	Super Shit Machine	10	Shuji Ishikawa	22:10
14	Shigehiro Irie	13	Keisuke Ishii	23:47
15	Makoto Oishi	12	Shigehiro Irie and Keisuke Ishii	23:37
16	Shuji Ishikawa	—	—	Winner
17	Keisuke Ishii	14	Kenny Omega	25:39
