= Judgement 2014 =

2014 DDT Pro-Wrestling event

- Promotion: DDT Pro-Wrestling
- Date: March 21, 2014
- City: Tokyo, Japan
- Venue: Korakuen Hall
- Attendance: 1,618

Judgement chronology
← Previous; 2013	Next → 2015

Judgement 2014 was a professional wrestling event promoted by DDT Pro-Wrestling (DDT). It took place on March 21, 2014, in Tokyo, Japan, at the Korakuen Hall. It was the eighteenth event under the Judgement name. The event aired domestically on Fighting TV Samurai.

== Storylines ==
Judgement 2014 featured seven professional wrestling matches that involved different wrestlers from pre-existing scripted feuds and storylines. Wrestlers portrayed villains, heroes, or less distinguishable characters in the scripted events that built tension and culminated in a wrestling match or series of matches.

== Event ==
The first match of the main card was dubbed "Monster Army Final" and was the last match of the Monster Army stable.

The next match was dubbed "DDT's Origin! Judgement Special Tag Team Match" and featured the team of Mikami and Nosawa Rongai, both founders of the promotion.

Next was a match that saw the participation of Aja Kong from Oz Academy.

The Right To Challenge Anytime, Anywhere Contract Battle Royal was a Rumble rules match for a KO-D Openweight Championship match at Max Bump 2014, on April 29. Five envelopes were suspended above the ring, four of which contained a "Right To Challenge Anytime, Anywhere" contract, giving the right to their holder to challenge any champion at any time in the following year. The last envelope contained a "Right To Challenge Your Favorite Wrestler" contract. Grabbing a contract resulted in being eliminated from the match.

== Results ==
No.	Results	Stipulations	Times
1^{D}	Shunma Katsumata vs. Suguru Miyatake ended in a time limit draw	Singles match	05:00
2	Monster Army (Hoshitango, Yuji Hino, Daisuke Sasaki and Antonio Honda) defeated Sanshiro Takagi, Toru Owashi, Gorgeous Matsuno and Gota Ihashi	Eight-man tag team match	10:07
3	Mikami and Nosawa Rongai defeated Takashi Sasaki and Kengo Takai	Tag team match	07:18
4	Shigehiro Irie and Aja Kong defeated Belt Hunter × Hunter (Danshoku Dino and Makoto Oishi)	Tag team match	07:51
5	Golden☆Lovers (Kota Ibushi and Kenny Omega) (c) defeated Nuru Nuru Brothers (Michael Nakazawa and Tomomitsu Matsunaga)	Tag team match for the KO-D Tag Team Championship	16:39
6	Akito won by last eliminating Konosuke Takeshita	Right To Challenge Anytime, Anywhere Contract Battle Royal	19:39
7	Kudo defeated Harashima (c)	Singles match for the KO-D Openweight Championship	19:54
(c) / – the champion(s) heading into the match; D / – this was a dark match

Right To Challenge Anytime, Anywhere Contract Battle Royal

Order	Name	Order eliminated	By	Time
1	Kazuki Hirata	3	Grabbing a contract	12:17
2	Super Sasadango Machine	6	Grabbing a contract	15:38
3	Yukio Sakaguchi	8	Yasu Urano	15:54
4	Soma Takao	4	Guanchulo	13:17
5	Tetsuya Endo	1	Grabbing a contract	08:10
6	Keisuke Ishii	9	Yasu Urano	16:50
7	Konosuke Takeshita	11	Akito	19:39
8	DJ Nira	7	Yasu Urano	15:54
9	Akito	—	—	Winner
10	Masa Takanashi	2	Grabbing a contract	10:34
11	Yasu Urano	10	Akito	17:56
12	Guanchulo	5	Grabbing a contract (Note: Guanchulo won the "Right To Challenge Your Favorite Wrestler" contract.)	13:46
