= Judgement 2009 =

2009 DDT Pro-Wrestling event

- Promotion: DDT Pro-Wrestling
- Date: April 5, 2009
- City: Tokyo, Japan
- Venue: Korakuen Hall
- Attendance: 1,454

Judgement chronology
← Previous; 2008	Next → 2010

Judgement 2009 was a professional wrestling event promoted by DDT Pro-Wrestling (DDT). It took place on April 5, 2009, in Tokyo, Japan, at the Korakuen Hall. It was the thirteenth event under the Judgement name. The event aired domestically on Fighting TV Samurai.

== Storylines ==
Judgement 2009 featured seven professional wrestling matches that involved different wrestlers from pre-existing scripted feuds and storylines. Wrestlers portrayed villains, heroes, or less distinguishable characters in the scripted events that built tension and culminated in a wrestling match or series of matches.

== Event ==
The dark match saw DJ Nira defeat Mammoth Handa and Yoshiaki Yago to earn a spot in the main event. However, after the match, Nira informed Sanshiro Takagi that he had a broken wrist and that he wouldn't be able to compete. Takagi asked Handa if he was up to the task but Handa refused as well because he believed he had injured his ribs. Yago then asked if he could take the spot but Takagi refused and locked him up in a locker.

Danshoku Dino teamed with Yoshihiko, an inflatable love doll, to defeat Piza Michinoku and Antonio Honda from the Italian Four Horsemen stable. During the match, Yoshihiko was "killed" by a Honda knee drop, which caused its head to burst open, and was replaced by a second Yoshihiko, who was also a love doll, only modified to resemble the Great Muta.

The next match was a tag team match featuring Akira Taue and Genba Hirayanagi from Pro Wrestling Noah (Noah).

Next, Kota Ibushi faced Taiji Ishimori from Noah.

The main event was a Rumble rules battle royal in which the winner won an opportunity to challenge the then KO-D Openweight Champion Sanshiro Takagi at Max Bump 2009, on May 4. Moreover, an envelope containing a championship match contract was suspended above the ring, giving whoever would grab it first the right to challenge a champion of their choosing at any time, in a similar fashion to WWE's Money in the Bank contract. Yoshiaki Yago, having freed himself from the locker, was the first to grab the contract before being eliminated. Harashima eventually won the match by last eliminating Big Japan Pro Wrestling's Daisuke Sekimoto.

== Results ==
No.	Results	Stipulations	Times
1^{D}	DJ Nira defeated Mammoth Handa and Yoshiaki Yago	Three-way match Winner participates in the battle royal main event.	02:49
2	Tomomitsu Matsunaga and Yukihiro Abe defeated Hikaru Sato and Keisuke Ishii	Tag team match	06:49
3	Mikami defeated Rion Mizuki	Singles match	08:40
4	Danshoku Dino and Yoshihiko defeated Italian Four Horsemen (Piza Michinoku and Antonio Honda)	Tag team match for #1 contendership to the KO-D Tag Team Championship	15:32
5	Akira Taue and Genba Hirayanagi defeated Sanshiro Takagi and Michael Nakazawa	Tag team match	11:33
6	Kota Ibushi defeated Taiji Ishimori	Singles match	24:14
7	Harashima won by last eliminating Daisuke Sekimoto (Note: Order of entrances: Toru Owashi, Hideki Shioda, the Kubota Brothers, Thanomsak Toba, Yasu Urano, Harashima, Kazuhiro Tamura, Poison Sawada Julie, Hoshitango, Sanshiro Takagi, Sasaki and Gabbana, DJ Nira, Jacques de Atsushinu, Daisuke Sekimoto, Francesco Togo, Louis Takanashi XIV. Order of eliminations: The Kubota Brothers, Thanomsak Toba, Toru Owashi, Hideki Shioda, Poison Sawada Julie, Kazuhiro Tamura, DJ Nira, Sanshiro Takagi, Yasu Urano, Hoshitango, Sasaki and Gabbana, Francesco Togo, Louis Takanashi XIV, Jacques de Atsushinu, Daisuke Sekimoto.)	KO-D Openweight Championship Conterdership Double Chance Battle Royal; Yoshiaki Yago grabbed the contract suspended above the ring.	26:47
D / – this was a dark match
