= Judgement 2008 =

2008 DDT Pro-Wrestling event

- Promotion: DDT Pro-Wrestling
- Date: March 9, 2008
- City: Tokyo, Japan
- Venue: Korakuen Hall
- Attendance: 1,200

Judgement chronology
← Previous; 2007	Next → 2009

Judgement 2008 was a professional wrestling event promoted by DDT Pro-Wrestling (DDT). It took place on March 9, 2008, in Tokyo, Japan, at the Korakuen Hall. It was the twelfth event under the Judgement name. The event aired domestically on Fighting TV Samurai.

== Storylines ==
Judgement 2008 featured eight professional wrestling matches that involved different wrestlers from pre-existing scripted feuds and storylines. Wrestlers portrayed villains, heroes, or less distinguishable characters in the scripted events that built tension and culminated in a wrestling match or series of matches.

== Event ==
The second match was for Muscle Sakai's personal belt, which was not a championship recognized by DDT. The match could be won by taking the belt off Sakai's waist.

Next, Gentaro acted as the special guest referee for a match between Michael Nakazawa and Tomomitsu Matsunaga. Nakazawa quickly went for a spear but Matsunaga dodged the attack and Nakazawa hit Gentaro instead which caused Nakazawa's disqualification in just 21 seconds after the bell. Gentaro then accepted Nakazawa's request for a rematch.

After the defeat of Kota Ibushi's team in the sixth match, Danshoku Dino took advantage of the fact that Ibushi was asleep backstage to pin him in order to become the new Ironman Heavymetalweight Champion.

Next was an eight-man tag team match dubbed "DDT 11th Anniversary Memorial Match" that saw the return of Mikami.

== Results ==
No.	Results	Stipulations	Times
1	Daisuke Sasaki and Seiya Morohashi defeated Yukihiro Abe and Rion Mizuki by submission	Tag team match	09:24
2	Yoshiaki Yago defeated Muscle Sakai by capturing Sakai's belt	Singles match	07:58
3	Tomomitsu Matsunaga defeated Michael Nakazawa by disqualification	Singles match with Gentaro as the special guest referee	00:21
4	Tomomitsu Matsunaga defeated Michael Nakazawa	Singles match with Gentaro as the special guest referee	03:18
5	Masa Takanashi (c) defeated Danshoku Dino and Kudo by disqualification	Three-way elimination match for the DDT Extreme Division Championship	10:10
6	Toru Owashi, Seiya Morohashi and Koo defeated Kota Ibushi, Daichi Kakimoto and Antonio Honda	Six-man tag team match	15:21
7	Sanshiro Takagi, Poison Sawada Julie, Super Uchuu Power and Tomohiko Hashimoto defeated Mikami, Thanomsak Toba, Takashi Sasaki and Gentaro	Eight-man tag team match	16:44
8	Harashima (c) defeated Yasu Urano	Singles match for the KO-D Openweight Championship	18:40
(c) / – the champion(s) heading into the match

=== Three-way elimination match ===
Eliminated	Wrestler	Eliminated by	Method	Time
1	Kudo	Danshoku Dino	Pinfall	08:44
2	Danshoku Dino	Masa Takanashi	Disqualification	10:10
Winner:	Masa Takanashi			
