= Ivan Markov =

Ivan Markov may refer to:

- Ivan Markov (Ataman) (died 1926), Ukrainian military commander
- Ivan Markov (weightlifter) (born 1988), Bulgarian weightlifter
- Ivan Markov (wrestler) (born 1984), Russian professional wrestler
