= Ryōgoku Peter Pan 2011 =

2011 DDT Pro-Wrestling event

Ryōgoku Peter Pan 2011: Twice Bitten, Thrice Shy
- Promotion: DDT Pro-Wrestling
- Date: July 24, 2011
- City: Tokyo, Japan
- Venue: Ryōgoku Kokugikan
- Attendance: 8,660

Peter Pan chronology
← Previous; 2010	Next → 2012

Ryōgoku Peter Pan 2011: Twice Bitten, Thrice Shy (両国ピーターパン2011〜二度あることは三度ある〜, Ryōgoku Pītā Pan 2011 nido aru koto wa sando aru) was a professional wrestling event promoted by DDT Pro-Wrestling (DDT). The event took place on July 24, 2011, in Tokyo at the Ryōgoku Kokugikan. The event featured nine matches, five of which were contested for championships. The event aired on Fighting TV Samurai.

== Storylines ==
The Ryōgoku Peter Pan 2011 event featured nine professional wrestling matches that involved different wrestlers from pre-existing scripted feuds and storylines. Wrestlers portrayed villains, heroes, or less distinguishable characters in the scripted events that built tension and culminated in a wrestling match or series of matches.

By winning the King of DDT tournament on May 29, Kudo earned a title match in the main event against KO-D Openweight Champion Shuji Ishikawa.

On June 18 at Dominion 6.18, Prince Devitt lost his IWGP Junior Heavyweight Championship to Best of the Super Juniors winner, Kota Ibushi. Devitt received his rematch at Ryōgoku Peter Pan 2011.

== Event ==
As in the previous year, Michael Nakazawa's anal blast was held as the opening ceremony. This time Nakazawa was selected by a fan votation. The detonation was carried out by retired wrestler Dick Togo using a "bazooka".

In the dark match preceding the main card, Sanshiro Takagi and Munenori Sawa from Battlearts challenged the team of Ricky Fuji and The Great Sasuke from Michinoku Pro Wrestling in a Falls Count Anywhere match for the Greater China Unified Zhongyuan Tag Team Championship. The match took place in various rooms of the backstage area.

In the Ironman Rumble match, Antonio Honda captured the Ironman Heavymetalweight Championship by eliminating former champion Daisuke Sasaki. However, just after the match, Gorgeous Matsuno surprised Honda and pinned him to become the new champion.

The four-way tag team elimination match saw the participations of Daisuke Sekimoto from Big Japan Pro Wrestling and Gentaro from Pro-Wrestling Freedoms. Minoru Fujita competed under the name "Hero!", the former name of his tag team partner Harashima.

Danshoku Dino faced Bob Sapp in a match scheduled for thirty rounds, with each round being three minutes in duration.

== Results ==
No.	Results	Stipulations	Times
1^{D}	TKG48 (Sanshiro Takagi and Munenori Sawa) defeated The Great Sasuke and Ricky Fuji (c)	Falls Count Anywhere tag team match for the Greater China Unified Zhongyuan Tag Team Championship	21:03
2	Keisuke Ishii defeated Shigehiro Irie	Singles match	9:25
3	Antonio Honda won by last eliminating Daisuke Sasaki (c)	Ironman Rumble for the Ironman Heavymetalweight Championship	21:46
4	Mikami defeated Poison Sawada Julie	Singles match	8:59
5	Daisuke Sekimoto and Masa Takanashi defeated Hero! Gundam (Harashima and Hero!) (c), Granma (Gentaro and Yasu Urano), and Kenny Omega and Michael Nakazawa	Four-way tag team elimination match for the KO-D Tag Team Championship	23:31
6	Sanshiro Takagi, Hikaru Sato, Soma Takao, Kazuki Hirata and Akito defeated Minoru Suzuki and Susan Shit Heart Superstars (Yoshiaki Yago, Kengo Ohka, Tomomitsu Matsunaga and Super Shit Machine)	Summer Night Fever in Ryōgoku 5 vs. 5 Elimination match	24:20
7	Kota Ibushi (c) defeated Prince Devitt	Singles match for the IWGP Junior Heavyweight Championship	13:50
8	Danshoku Dino defeated Bob Sapp	Special Rules match Scheduled for 30 three-minute rounds, alternating between "Bob Rules" (all sexualised moves are forbidden) and "Gay Rules" (targeting below the belt is permitted).	3R 2:58
9	Kudo defeated Shuji Ishikawa (c)	Singles match for the KO-D Openweight Championship	27:24
(c) / – the champion(s) heading into the match; D / – this was a dark match

=== Ironman Rumble ===
Order	Name	Order eliminated	By	Time
1	Daisuke Sasaki (c)	14	Antonio Honda	21:46
2	Gorgeous Matsuno	1	Daisuke Sasaki and Makoto Oishi	2:57
3	Makoto Oishi	3	Yoshihiko	7:05
4	Cherry	4	Daisuke Sasaki and Antonio Honda	7:47
5	Rion Mizuki	2	Makoto Oishi	5:43
6	Thanomsak Toba	7	Riki Sensyu	11:06
7	Yuzuki Aikawa	5	Emi Sakura	9:10
8	DJ Nira	9	Mr. #6	16:17
9	Yoshihiko	6	Emi Sakura	10:07
10	Antonio Honda	—	—	Winner
11	Emi Sakura	13	Daisuke Sasaki	19:58
12	Tsuyoshi Kikuchi	12	Emi Sakura	19:45
13	Riki Sensyu	8	Hoshitango	11:32
14	Hoshitango	10	Mr. #6	17:21
15	Mr. #6	11	Emi Sakura	18:16

=== Four-way tag team elimination match ===
Eliminated	Wrestler	Team	Eliminated by	Method	Time
1	Yasu Urano	Gentaro and Yasu Urano	Kenny Omega	Pinfall	13:15
2	Michael Nakazawa	Kenny Omega and Michael Nakazawa	Daisuke Sekimoto	Pinfall	16:37
3	Hero!	Harashima and Hero!	Masa Takanashi	Pinfall	23:21
Winners:	Daisuke Sekimoto and Masa Takanashi				

=== Summer Night Fever in Ryōgoku 5 vs. 5 Elimination match ===
Eliminated	Wrestler	Eliminated by	Method	Time
1	Akito	Yoshiaki Yago	Submission	04:43
2	Mr. Magic	Kazuki Hirata	Pinfall	07:10
3	Kazuki Hirata	Tomomitsu Matsunaga	Pinfall	07:46
4	Yoshiaki Yago	Hikaru Sato	Over the top rope	12:40
5	Hikaru Sato	Minoru Suzuki	Pinfall	14:36
6 (Note: Takagi and Suzuki eliminated each other at the same time by going over the top rope.)	Sanshiro Takagi	Minoru Suzuki	Over the top rope	18:20
6	Minoru Suzuki	Sanshiro Takagi	Over the top rope	18:20
8	Kengo Ohka	Soma Takao	Over the top rope	20:13
9	Tomomitsu Matsunaga	Soma Takao	Pinfall	24:20
Survivor(s):	Soma Takao			
