= Independent Wrestling Federation (Russia) =

Russian professional wrestling promotion

- Native name: Независимая федерация реслинга
- Type: Private
- Industry: Professional wrestling
- Founded: November 17, 2002; 23 years ago in Moscow, Russia
- Founder: Vadim Koryagin
- Headquarters: Moscow, Russia
- Area served: Russia
- Key people: Daniil Dmitriev (CEO)
- Products: Live events Television
- Website: wrestling.moscow

Independent Wrestling Federation (IWF, Russian: Независимая федерация реслинга (НФР)) is a professional wrestling promotion based in Moscow, Russia. The promotion was founded by Vadim Koryagin in 2002. IWF is the first and longest-running promotion in Russia. IWF has held over 200 shows, mostly in Moscow. On average, the shows are attended by 100-150 spectators.

From 2005 to 2010, IWF shows were aired on Russian national television on 7TV and Russian Extreme channels including their weekly show Danger Zone. Events have also been aired on YouTube and VK since 2012.

== History ==
The first attempt to launch professional wrestling in Russia was the rWo (Russian World Order or Russian Wrestling Organization) project. In 2001, a group of enthusiasts from various cities in Russia and the CIS launched a website and a mailing list, the purpose was to find and unite wrestling fans, study the moves and techniques, and further conduct wrestling shows. The initiative ended only with backyard wrestling.

The promotion was founded in 2002 by entrepreneur Vadim Koryagin, who got to know professional wrestling while living in Canada and was trained at Camp Martell Wrestling School. The organization was founded on the basis of the sports-artistic wrestling section, located in Kapotnya, Moscow. The first training took place on June 20, 2002. The first show The Zone of Physical Punishment was held on November 17, 2002. Six men (Artur Nurmukhametov, Rock'n'Roll Rebel (Vadim Koryagin), Moscow Terminator, Max Krimi, and two rWo members - Knyaz and Russian Size) and two women (Vita and Tera) performed at the show. Moscow Terminator became inaugural IWF Champion and Vita became inaugural IWF Girls Champion.

Since 2003, IWF has held monthly live event shows Danger Zone. The first show outside of Moscow took place on August 9, 2004, in Korolyov, near Moscow, at Vympel Stadium in the open air, with an extremely low attendance.

From November 2005 to December 2006, the show Danger Zone was broadcast on national television on 7TV channel. From May 2007 to the end of 2007 on Russian Extreme TV channel, and from May 2008 to April 2010 again on 7TV.

Since 2005, the IWF has been hosting Wrestliada show, with foreign professional wrestlers as guests.

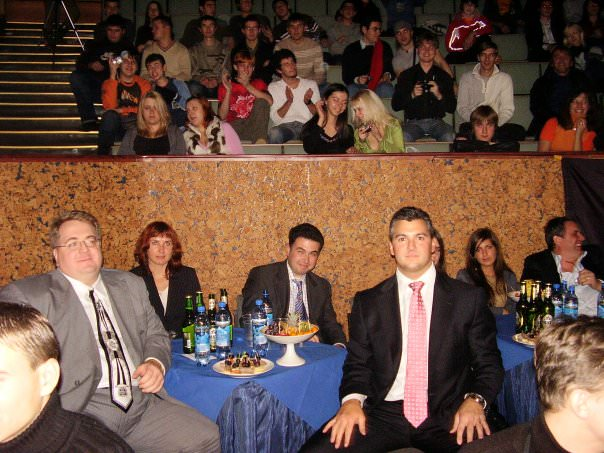
Shane McMahon on the IWF show, November 13, 2006

On November 13, 2006, Shane McMahon attended the IWF show.

In 2011, Vadim Koryagin moved to Singapore and opened the Singapore Pro Wrestling. Daniil Dmitriev, who also performs in the ring as a referee, became the head of IWF.

At Wrestliada 2012 Ivan Markov defeated El Generico in the main event.

At the Dramatic Dream Team (DDT) pay-per-view Shiwasu no Union 2013 Ivan Markov defeated Shuji Ishikawa in a decision match to become inaugural Union Pro Max champion.

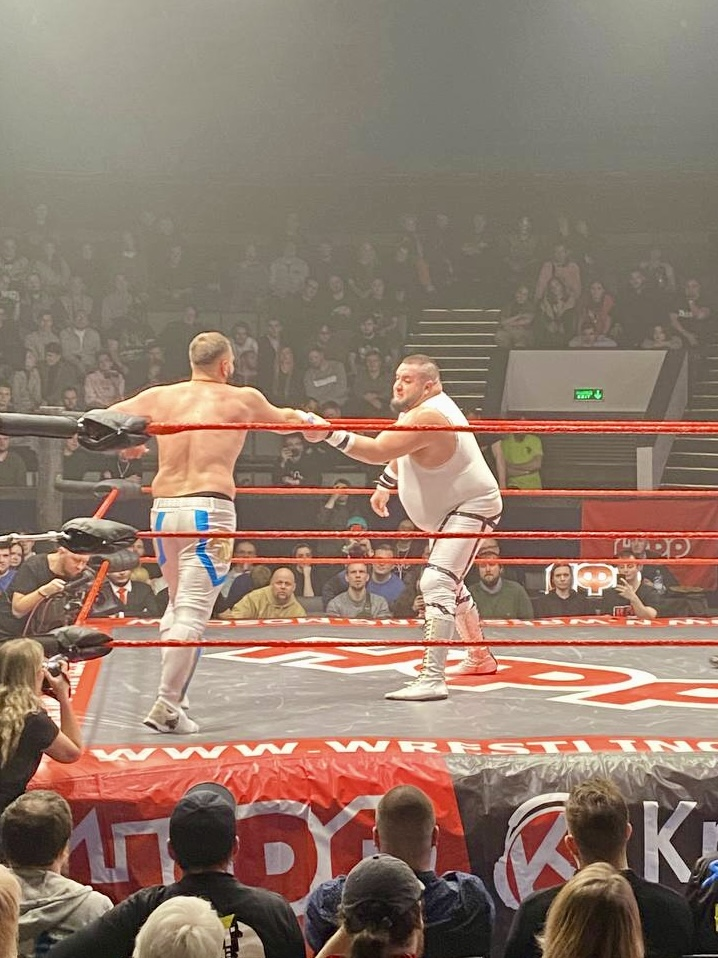
Anton Deryabin against Dmitry Orlov, IWF show, 2022

On February 15, 2014, Total Nonstop Action Wrestling's Zema Ion, Extreme Tiger and Sonjay Dutt took part in the Danger Zone #82: IWF vs. TNA show in Moscow.

On November 20, Victor Zangiev was a guest on the Independent Wrestling Federation's "20 Years of Pro Wrestling in Russia" anniversary show. Zangiev interfered in the main event of the show and held Ronnie Crimson a belly-to-belly suplex and then locked him in a knee backbreaker lock.

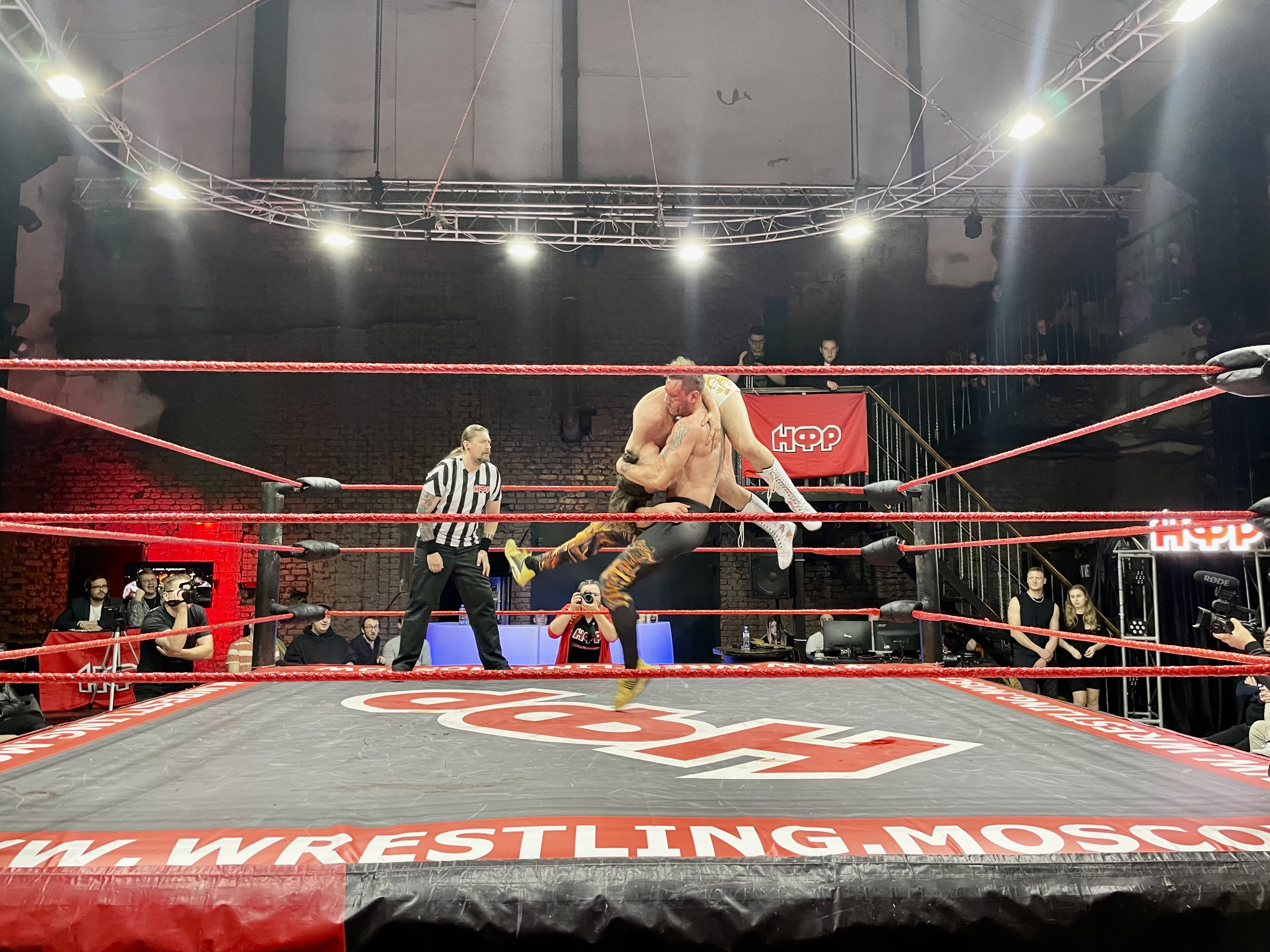
Alexander vs. Angelo Moretti at the IWF President's Cup show, June 3, 2023

As of 2022, the IWF produces a weekly Punch show on its YouTube channel and hosts several live events a year.

On October 1, 2023, National Pro-Wrestling will be taped, which will be an exclusive for the TV channel Match! Fighter, IWF returns to Russian national television on a permanent basis after 13 years.

=== School ===
The IWF Wrestling School has been in operation since 2002. Talent and IWF alumni perform on the independent scene in Europe and Asia. IWF alumna Natalia Markova has had the most international success, performing in independent and major promotions throughout the world, including the National Wrestling Alliance (NWA), Evolve, Juggalo Championship Wrestling (JCW), Full Impact Pro, Lucha Libre AAA Worldwide (AAA), Ohio Valley Wrestling (OVW), World Wrestling Council (WWC), and All Elite Wrestling (AEW).
