= Greater China Unified Zhongyuan Tag Team Championship =

Professional wrestling championship

- The Greater China Unified Zhongyuan Tag Team Championship belts

Details
- Promotion: DDT Pro-Wrestling
- Date established: 2011
- Date retired: November 4, 2011
Statistics
- First champions: Choun Shiryu and Cao Zhang
- Final champions: TKG48 (Munenori Sawa and Sanshiro Takagi)

The Greater China Unified Zhongyuan Tag Team Championship (Japanese: 大中華統一中原タッグ王座, Hepburn: Daichūka Tōitsu Chūgen Taggu Ōza) was a professional wrestling championship in the Japanese promotion DDT Pro-Wrestling. The title was introduced in 2011, in DDT's parodic sub-brand New Beijing Pro-Wrestling.

== History ==
In storyline, this title was once held by Chinese historical figures Yuan Shao and Yuan Shu who were the 17th champions, before Choun Shiryu and Cao Zhang won them in April 2011, in New Beijing Pro-Wrestling, a DDT sub-brand that parodied New Japan Pro-Wrestling and Chinese history. The titles were only contested a handful of times throughout 2011, mostly in Union Pro-Wrestling, another sub-brand of DDT, where the title belts were actually unveiled in May 2011.

== Reigns ==
Key
No.	Overall reign number
Reign	Reign number for the specific team—reign numbers for the individuals are in parentheses, if different
Days	Number of days held
Defenses	Number of successful defenses
N/A	Unknown information

No.	Champion	Championship change			Reign statistics			Notes	Ref.
No.	Champion	Date	Event	Location	Reign	Days	Defenses	Notes	Ref.
Championship history is unrecorded from 200 AD to 2011.
18	Choun Shiryu and Cao Zhang	April 2011	—N/a	—N/a	1	(Note: The exact date the championship was won has not been confirmed, putting their title reign at between 33 and 62 days.)	0	Though the circumstances of this title win are fictional, Choun Shiryu and Cao Zhang are recognized as the 18th champions.	
19	TKG48 (Sanshiro Takagi and Munenori Sawa)	June 2, 2011	Ame ni mo Makezu	Tokyo, Japan	1	31	0		
20	The Great Sasuke and Ricky Fuji	July 3, 2011	Tanabata, Wishes Come True Even 4 Days in Advance! 2011	Tokyo, Japan	1	21	0	Kyohei Wada was the special referee for this match.	
21	TKG48 (Sanshiro Takagi and Munenori Sawa)	July 24, 2011	Ryōgoku Peter Pan 2011	Tokyo, Japan	2	103	2		
—	Deactivated	November 4, 2011	DDT President Pervert!: Last Wrestling Match	Tokyo, Japan	—	—	—	Sanshiro Takagi retired the title after he and Munenori Sawa successfully defended it in a three-way falls count anywhere match against The Brahman Brothers and the team of Danshoku Dino and Choun Shiryu.	

== Combined reigns ==
=== By team ===
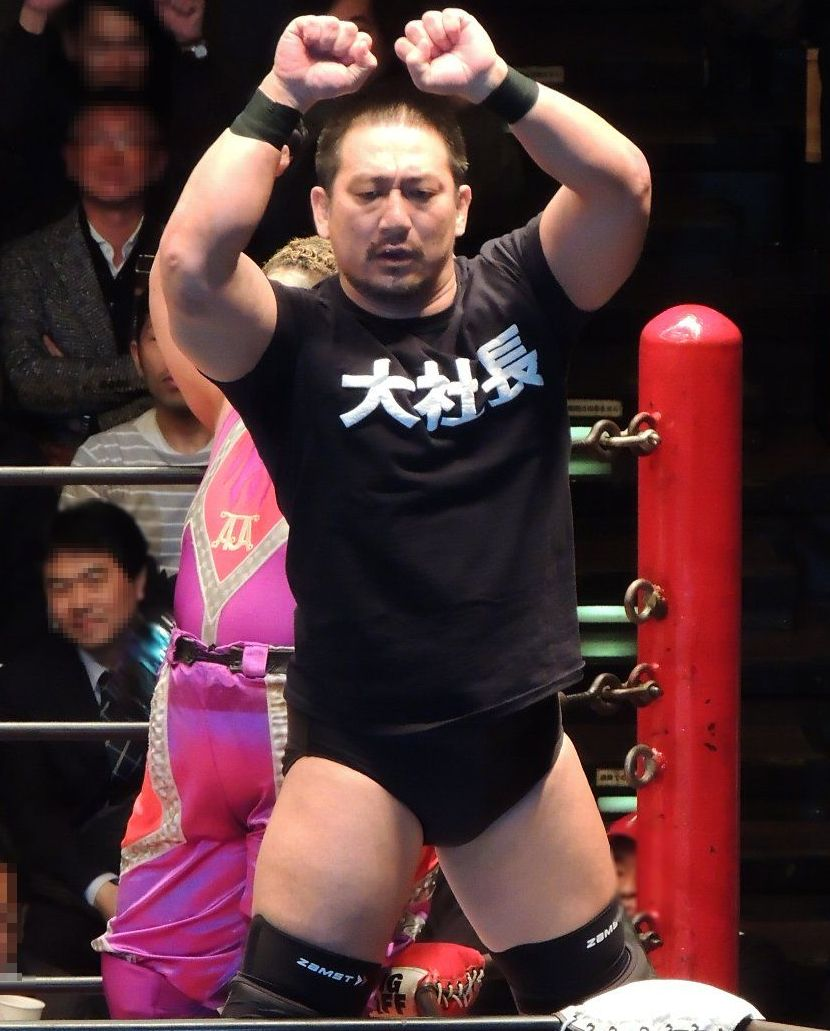
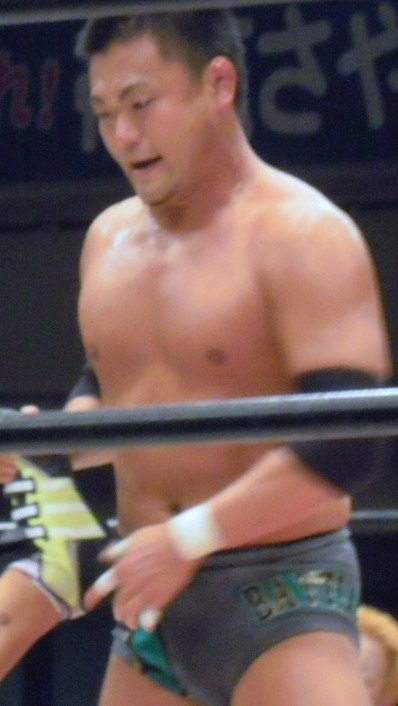
2-time champions TKG48 (Sanshiro Takagi and Munenori Sawa)

¤	The exact length of at least one title reign is uncertain, so the shortest possible length is used.

Rank	Team	No. of reigns	Combined defenses	Combined days
1	TKG48 (Sanshiro Takagi and Munenori Sawa)	2	2	134
2	Choun Shiryu and Cao Zhang	1	0	33¤
3	The Great Sasuke and Ricky Fuji	1	0	21

=== By wrestler ===
¤	The exact length of at least one title reign is uncertain, so the shortest possible length is used.

Rank	Wrestler	No. of reigns	Combined defenses	Combined days
1	Munenori Sawa	2	2	134
1	Sanshiro Takagi	2	2	134
3	Cao Zhang	1	0	33¤
3	Choun Shiryu	1	0	33¤
5	Ricky Fuji	1	0	21
5	The Great Sasuke	1	0	21

== See also ==
- DDT Pro-Wrestling
- Professional wrestling in Japan
