= D Generations Cup =

DDT Pro-Wrestling event series

- D Generations Cup logo
- Promotion: CyberFight
- Brand: DDT
- First event: D Generations Cup 2023

The D Generations Cup (DGC) is an annual professional wrestling tournament organized by CyberFight's DDT Pro-Wrestling brand. This tournament showcases up-and-coming talents from the company, akin to the Young Drama Cup, last held in 2010.

The inaugural edition, held in 2023, employed a round-robin format, with each participant facing all other wrestlers within the same block in singles matches. The winner of each block was determined via a point system, with two points for a win, one point for a draw, and no points for a loss. On the final day of the event, the winners of each block faced each other to determine the winner of the tournament. The 2024 edition adopted a single-elimination bracket format, followed by a return to the round-robin system in the subsequent year.

== History ==
DDT Pro-Wrestling announced the participants of the inaugural D Generations Cup on January 2, 2023. The schedule was then announced on January 10.

== Tournament finals ==
#	Event	Date	Venue	Location	Final	Ref.
1	Into The Fight 2023	February 26, 2023	Korakuen Hall	Tokyo, Japan	Yuya Koroku vs. Takeshi Masada	
2	April Fool 2024	April 7, 2024	Korakuen Hall	Tokyo, Japan	To-y vs. Rukiya	
3	Next Generation 2025: Kisaragi Roman	February 23, 2025	Korakuen Hall	Tokyo, Japan	Takeshi Masada vs. Yuya Koroku	
4	Hybrid Performer 2026	February 22, 2026	Korakuen Hall	Tokyo, Japan	Takeshi Masada vs. Kazumi Sumi	

== Tournaments ==
Year	Winner	Times won	Participants
2023	Takeshi Masada	1	8
2024	To-y	1	8
2025	Yuya Koroku	1	8
2026	Kazuma Sumi	1	10

== Results ==
=== 2023 ===
The D Generations Cup 2023 was the first edition of the tournament. Held between January 29 and February 26, it featured eight competitors divided in two blocks of four ("A" and "B"). The final was held on February 26, at Into The Fight 2023, and saw Takeshi Masada defeat Yuya Koroku. As a result, Masada earned a spot on the DDT shows in Hollywood on March 30 and 31.

Final standings
Block A		Block B	
Yuya Koroku	6	Takeshi Masada	4
Hideki Okatani	4	Toy Kojima	4
Ilusion	2	Yuki Ishida	2
Kazuma Sumi	0	Keigo Nakamura	2

Block A	Okatani	Koroku	Sumi	Ilusion
Okatani	—N/a	Koroku (9:39)	Okatani (5:22)	Okatani (6:25)
Koroku	Koroku (9:39)	—N/a	Koroku (6:39)	Koroku (8:11)
Sumi	Okatani (5:22)	Koroku (6:39)	—N/a	Illusion (6:19)
Ilusion	Okatani (6:25)	Koroku (6:39)	Illusion (6:19)	—N/a
Block B	Nakamura	Kojima	Ishida	Masada
Nakamura	—N/a	Kojima (7:58)	Ishida (11:02)	Nakamura (7:10)
Kojima	Kojima (7:58)	—N/a	Kojima (8:58)	Masada (8:21)
Ishida	Ishida (11:02)	Kojima (8:58)	—N/a	Masada (9:34)
Masada	Nakamura (7:10)	Masada (8:21)	Masada (9:34)	—N/a

Final
A1	Yuya Koroku	8:26
B1	Takeshi Masada	Pin

=== 2024 ===
The second D Generations Cup was held between March 21 and April 7, 2024. The eight participants fought in a single-elimination bracket to earn a spot in the 2024 King of DDT Tournament. The final was held on April 7, at April Fool 2024, and saw To-y defeat Rukiya.

First round March 21
Yuni	8:32
Ilusion	Sub
To-y	Pin
Tsubasa Suzuki	5:08
Munetatsu Nakamura	Pin
Kazuma Sumi	6:50
Yuya Koroku	9:12
Rukiya	Pin

Semifinals; March 26
Ilusion	8:53
To-y	Pin
Munetatsu Nakamura	6:54
Rukiya	Pin

Final; April 7
To-y	Pin
Rukiya	10:22

=== 2025 ===
The third edition of the D Generations Cup took place between February 4 and February 23, 2025. Returning to the round-robin system, the tournament featured eight competitors divided into two blocks of four ("A" and "B"), competing for a future KO-D Openweight Championship match. In a rematch of the 2023 final, Yuya Koroku defeated Takeshi Masada to win the cup and a KO-D Openweight Championship opportunity against Chris Brookes on April 6, at Change Age 2025: My Lie in April. He would go on to fail to win the title.

Final standings
Block A		Block B	
Takeshi Masada	6	Yuya Koroku	4
Ilusion	2	To-y	4
Keigo Nakamura	2	Kazuma Sumi	3
Yuki Ishida	2	Yuni	1

Block A	Masada	Nakamura	Ilusion	Ishida
Masada	—N/a	Masada (11:49)	Masada (9:52)	Masada (8:20)
Nakamura	Masada (11:49)	—N/a	Ilusion (11:12)	Nakamura (6:45)
Ilusion	Masada (9:52)	Ilusion (11:12)	—N/a	Ishida (0:35)
Ishida	Masada (8:20)	Nakamura (6:45)	Ishida (0:35)	—N/a
Block B	To-y	Koroku	Yuni	Sumi
To-y	—N/a	Koroku (12:16)	To-y (6:22)	To-y (8:30)
Koroku	Koroku (12:16)	—N/a	Koroku (8:25)	Sumi (11:17)
Yuni	To-y (6:22)	Koroku (8:25)	—N/a	Draw (15:00)
Sumi	To-y (8:30)	Sumi (11:17)	Draw (15:00)	—N/a

Final
A1	Takeshi Masada	16:40
B1	Yuya Koroku	Sub

=== 2026 ===
The fourth edition of the D Generations Cup took place between January 5 and February 22, 2026. The tournament featured ten competitors divided into two blocks of five ("A" and "B"), competing for a future DDT Universal Championship match. In Block B, a three-way tie between Yuya Koroku, Rukiya and Takeshi Masada was resolved via a tomoesen, which Masada won to qualify to the final. At Hybrid Performer 2026, Kazuma Sumi defeated Masada to win the cup and a shot at Daisuke Sasaki's DDT Universal Championship at Judgement 2026.

Final standings
Block A		Block B	
Kazuma Sumi	6	Takeshi Masada	6
To-y	5	Yuya Koroku	6
Daichi Sato	4	Rukiya	6
Yuki Ishida	3	Yuni	2
Ilusion	2	Hinata Kasai	0

Block A	To-y	Sato	Ishida	Ilusion	Sumi
To-y	—N/a	To-y (10:31)	Draw (15:00)	Ilusion (12:42)	To-y (12:20)
Sato	To-y (10:31)	—N/a	Satoh (9:42)	Satoh (6:37)	Sumi (12:39)
Ishida	Draw (15:00)	Satoh (9:42)	—N/a	Ishida (12:04)	Sumi (10:22)
Ilusion	Ilusion (12:42)	Satoh (6:37)	Ishida (12:04)	—N/a	Sumi (10:27)
Sumi	To-y (12:20)	Sumi (12:39)	Sumi (10:22)	Sumi (10:27)	—N/a
Block B	Masada	Koroku	Yuni	Rukiya	Kasai
Masada	—N/a	Masada (12:33)	Masada (9:53)	Rukiya (11:47)	Masada (6:42)
Koroku	Masada (12:33)	—N/a	Koroku (9:19)	Koroku (8:22)	Koroku (9:43)
Yuni	Masada (9:53)	Koroku (9:19)	—N/a	Rukiya (6:52)	Yuni (5:31)
Rukiya	Rukiya (11:47)	Koroku (8:22)	Rukiya (6:52)	—N/a	Rukiya (7:38)
Kasai	Masada (6:42)	Koroku (9:43)	Yuni (5:31)	Rukiya (7:38)	—N/a

Block B Decision tomoesen
Yuya Koroku	4:07	—	9:46
Rukiya	Pin	3:12	—
Takeshi Masada	—	Pin	Pin

Final
A1	Kazuma Sumi	Pin
B1	Takeshi Masada	17:08

== See also ==
- Young Drama Cup
- DDT Pro-Wrestling
- Professional wrestling in Japan
