= Ivan Markov (wrestler) =

Russian professional wrestler (born 1984)

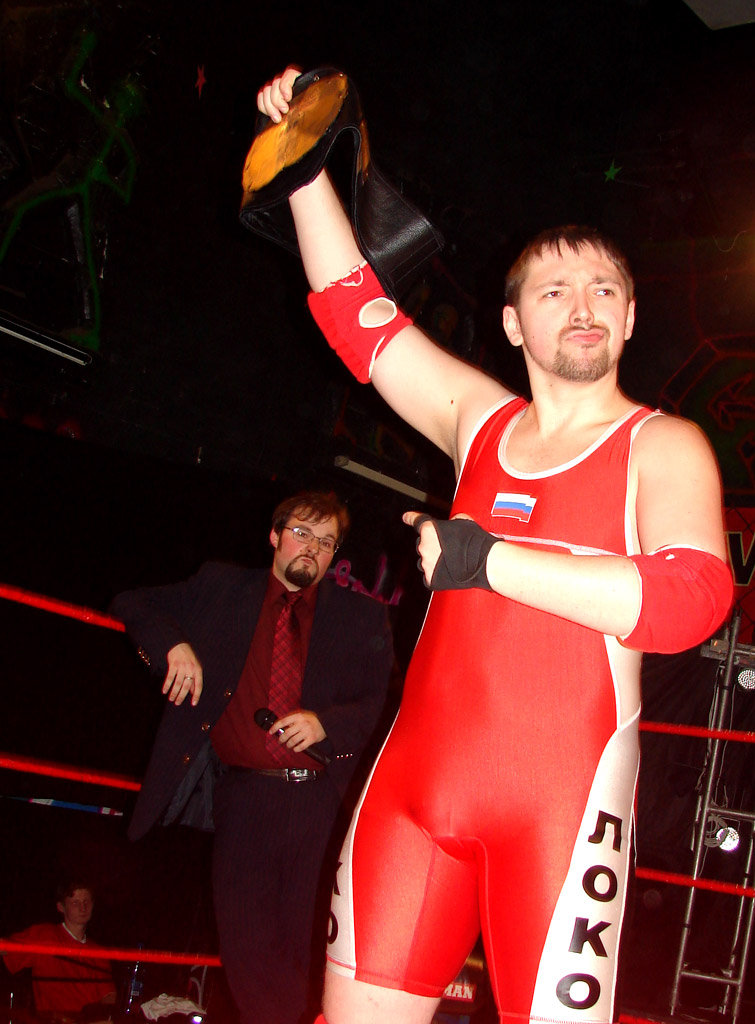
- Ivan 'Locomotive' Markov at ringside

Personal information
- Born: Ivan Markov; February 6, 1984 (age 42)

Professional wrestling career
- Ring name(s): Ivan Markov; Locomotive
- Billed height: 6 ft 1 in (185 cm)
- Billed weight: 253 lb (115 kg)
- Billed from: Moscow
- Trained by: IWF school
- Debut: September 24, 2004

Ivan Markov (Russian: Иван Марков, born 6 February 1984) is a Russian professional wrestler. Markov is known for his work at Independent Wrestling Federation (IWF) and the European and Asian promotions. He was the inaugural Union Pro Max Champion in Dramatic Dream Team.

== Professional wrestling career ==
=== Independent Wrestling Federation (Russia) (НФР) ===
==== (2004-present) ====
At the Independent Wrestling Federation (IWF) pay-per-view "Danger Zone" in September 2004, Ivan Markov made his debut.

=== Dramatic Dream Team (DDT) ===
==== (2011-2013) ====
At the Dramatic Dream Team (DDT) pay-per-view "Shiwasu no Union" 2013 Ivan Markov Defeated Shuji Ishikawa in a decision match to become inaugural Union Pro Max champion.

=== Union Pro Wrestling (Union Pro) ===
==== (2014) ====
At Union Pro Wrestling (Union Pro) pay-per-view "Union Pro New Year Union 2014" Ivan Markov defeats FUMA at Union Pro MAX Title Match.

=== Professional Wrestling League (PWL) ===
==== (2012) ====
Renat Tugushev defeats Ivan Markov by DQ at pay-per-view "RWF" 28.04.2012.

=== Westside Xtreme Wrestling (wXw) ===
==== (2012) ====
Champions Of Champions (Absolute Andy & Bad Bones) & D. J. Hyde defeat Ivan Markov, MASADA & Mike Schwarz at WxW pay-per-view Dead End XII. Markov got into a huge controversy while performing on this show. During a match that went off script, he injured Bad Bones. The wXw officials noted his arrogant behavior during the show. After the show, he made a series of comments that further inflamed the situation.

=== Turkish Power Wrestling (TPW) ===
==== (2012-2018) ====
Joe E. Legend defeats Ivan Markov at pay-per-view "TPW" 02.06.2012. Murat Bosporus & MVP defeat Ivan Markov & Joe E. Legend at pay-per-view "TPW" 31.03.2018. Murat Bosporus & MVP defeat Ivan Markov & Joe E. Legend at pay-per-view "TPW" 31.03.2018.

=== Wrestling New Classic (WNC) ===
==== (2013) ====
Lin Byron & TAJIRI defeat Ekaterina Bonnie & Ivan Markov at WNC TV-Show 31.03.2013

=== Wrestling In Japan - Freelance Shows ===
==== (2013) ====
The Bodyguard defeats Ivan Markov at IWF Heavyweight Title Match at "Big Muscle Classic II - Bodyguard Return Thanksgiving with WNC"

=== New Wrestling Entertainment (NWE) ===
==== (2013) ====
King Danza defeats Ivan Markov at NWE The Wrestling Show 06.09.2013

=== All Wrestling Organization (AWO) ===
==== (2013-2014) ====
Kronus & Leonardo defeat Idan Boulder & Ivan Markov at AWO TLV Clash 10.10.2013

=== Dubai Wrestling Entertainment (DWE) ===
==== (2013) ====
Chris Raaber defeats Ivan Markov at DWE 08.11.2013

=== Union Of European Wrestling Alliances (UEWA) ===
==== (2013-2019) ====
Demolition Davies defeats Ivan Markov at DPW Tatanka Tour, under the umbrella of the Union of European Wrestling Alliances.

=== New European Championship Wrestling (NEW) ===
==== (2014-2015) ====
Ivan Markov take part on 30 Man Snake Pit Battle Royal at NEW Snakepit 2014

=== Northern Storm Wrestling (NSW) ===
==== (2015-2019) ====
Anton Deryabin defeats Ivan Markov and LaPatka and Ronnie Crimson at NSW Northern Storm #1

=== Singapore Pro Wrestling (SPW) ===
==== (2016-2019) ====
Under the name Lokomotiv, Markov would win the SPW Southeast Asian Championship, defeating Kaiser Trexxus in a chair match. Lokomotiv would hold the tile until May 2019 where he would lose to "The Statement" Andruew Tang in a four-way match also involving Jake de Leon and Trexxus. Lokomotiv would hold the record of the longest reigning SEA champion of all time, with an outstanding reign of 462 days, until May 2021 where "The Statement" Andruew Tang would beat it.

=== Ligue Nationale de Catch (LNC) ===
==== (2019-2020) ====
Tom LaRuffa defeats Ivan Markov at LNC Veni Vidi Vici 3

=== Allied Independent Wrestling Federations (AIWF) ===
==== (2019) ====
Robu defeats Ivan Markov at NSW Vosstanie

== Personal life ==
Ivan Markov is married to fellow professional wrestler Natalia Markova.

== Championships an accomplishments ==
- Independent Wrestling Federation (Russia) (НФР)

- IWF Hardcore Championship (1 time)
- IWF Heavyweight Championship (6 times)
- IWF Moscow Championship (1 time)
- IWF Tag Team Championship (2 times) – with Flexx Bloodberg (1) and Chris Rave (1)
- IWF Lightweight Championship (1 time)
- President's Cup (2005)
- IWF King Of Hardcore Cup (3 times) (2010, 2011, 2014)
- Luzhnikov Cup (2018)
- Wrestler of the Year (2010-2015)

- DDT Pro-Wrestling / Union Pro Wrestling

- Union Max Championship (1 time, inaugural)

- Northern Storm Wrestling

- NSW Anti-Champion Championship (1 time)
- NSW Extreme Championship (1 time)
- NSW Championship (1 time)

- Singapore Pro Wrestling

- SPW Southeast Asian Championship (1 time)
- King Of Malaysian Hardcore (2016)

- Gorky City Wrestling

- GCW Hardcore Championship (1 time)
