= Munenori Sawa =

Japanese professional wrestler (born 1979)

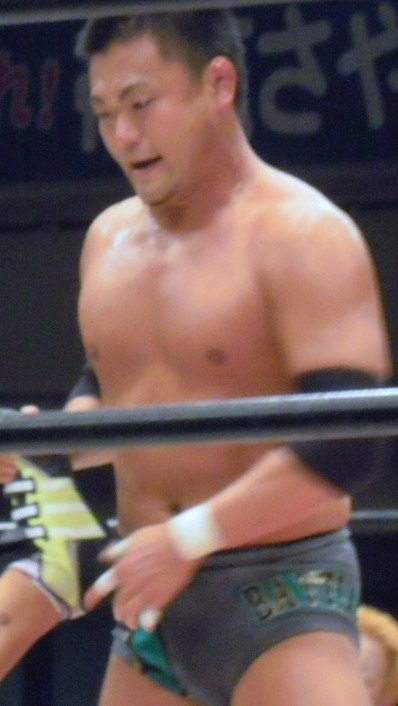
- Sawa in December 2010

Personal information
- Born: Munenori Sawa; April 20, 1979 (age 47) Suginami, Tokyo

Professional wrestling career
- Ring name(s): Ippanjin Munenori Sawa; Lee Ranjei; Lingerie Mutoh; Munenori Sawa
- Billed height: 1.74 m (5 ft 8 1/2 in)
- Billed weight: 80 kg (176 lb)
- Trained by: Tamashii Okamoto; Yuki Ishikawa; UWF Snakepit Japan
- Debut: August 31, 2003
- Retired: November 9, 2011

Munenori Sawa (澤 宗紀, Sawa Munenori; born April 20, 1979) is a Japanese professional wrestler. Sawa was trained by and spent his entire career in the Battlarts promotion, adopting the promotion's "Bati Bati" wrestling style, known for its stiff strikes and submission-based shoot wrestling, but would often also incorporate comedy into his matches, especially when performing as Lingerie Mutoh (ランジェリー武藤, Ranjerī Mutō), his comedic take on Keiji Mutoh.

Besides Battlarts, Sawa also worked for various other promotions in Japan, Germany and the United States, most notably Pro Wrestling Zero1 (Zero1), where he became an NWA Intercontinental Tag Team and NWA International Lightweight Tag Team Champion and the winner of the 2011 Tenkaichi Jr. tournament, and where he wrestled his initial retirement match on November 9, 2011, four days after the folding of Battlarts.

Since his initial retirement from professional wrestling, Sawa has wrestled grappling matches for ZST and has wrestled as Ippanjin Munenori Sawa (一般人・澤 宗紀, Ippanjin Sawa Munenori; lit. "Ordinary Person Munenori Sawa"). He has wrestled more since 2024, mainly under his Ippanjin persona, which parodies mainstream Japanese politics.

== Professional wrestling career ==
=== Battlarts (2003–2011) ===
After graduating from high school, Sawa entered the Battlarts dojo, where he was trained by the promotion's founder Yuki Ishikawa and Tamashii Okamoto in amateur wrestling. Sawa later continued wrestling in college. In 2002, Sawa started taking part in grappling matches, before entering UWF Snakepit Japan, where he received further training in mixed martial arts and professional wrestling. Sawa made his professional wrestling debut on August 31, 2003, but did not become a full-time wrestler until nearly two years later. In 2005, Sawa won a grappling tournament in the 80 kg (180 lb) class, held by Combat Wrestling. Sawa fought his only official mixed martial arts match on May 21, 2006, when he was defeated by Takeshi Ono via technical knockout due to strikes.

After deciding to become a full-time professional wrestler, Sawa returned to Battlarts in 2005, making the promotion his new home. He made his in-ring debut for the promotion on June 5 in a losing effort against Daisuke Sekimoto. For his first 25 months in the promotion, Sawa was unable to win a single match, losing to the likes of Manabu Hara, Daisuke Ikeda, Viktor Krueger in a WAA Heavyweight Championship match, and Yuki Ishikawa, before finally submitting Michinoku Pro Wrestling (Michinoku Pro)'s Fujita "Jr." Hayato for his first win on July 21, 2007. From October to November, Sawa, along with Yuki Ishikawa, represented Battlarts in Fu-Ten Promotion's Bati Bati tag team tournament, where they made it to the semifinals, before losing to Takahiro Oba and Takeshi Ono. In late 2007, Sawa began feuding with El Dorado Wrestling representative Toru Owashi. On November 11, Owashi and Manabu Hara defeated Sawa and Ikuto Hidaka in a tag team match via referee stoppage, after Sawa was unable to continue following Owashi's powerbomb. On December 24, Sawa and Owashi met in a singles match, which Owashi won via knockout following another powerbomb. When Owashi left Battlarts at the end of the year, Sawa started a new rivalry with Alexander Otsuka, with the first exchange between the two taking place on April 6, 2008, when Otsuka and Katsumi Usuda defeated Sawa and Yuki Ishikawa in a tag team match with Otsuka defeating Sawa via knockout following a dragon suplex. Sawa and Otsuka met in a singles match on June 8, when Otsuka was again victorious. Nine days later, Sawa's and Otsuka's rivalry led to a match in the Real Japan Pro Wrestling (RJPW) promotion, where Sawa unsuccessfully challenged Otsuka for his Legend Championship. On July 26, Sawa teamed with Otsuka and Yuki Ishikawa in a six-man elimination tag team match, where they wrestled Daisuke Ikeda, Katsumi Usuda and Super Tiger II to a draw. The match received rave reviews and was later recognized as one of the best matches of 2008. The final singles match between Sawa and Otsuka took place on January 10, 2009, when Otsuka defeated Sawa in the first round of the B-Rule grappling tournament. The following July, Sawa took part in the first B1 Climax tournament. After two wins and two losses, Sawa failed to advance from his round-robin block.

On February 7, 2010, Sawa took part in Yuta Yoshikawa's retirement match, where he and Ikuto Hidaka defeated Yoshikawa and Katsumi Usuda, with Sawa defeating Yoshikawa via technical knockout. On December 26, Sawa teamed with Battlarts founder Yuki Ishikawa in a tag team match, where they were defeated by Hideki Suzuki and Super Tiger II. Following the match, Ishikawa announced that Battlarts would be folding at the end of 2011. For the final year of the promotion, Sawa and Ishikawa worked together, both as partners and opponents. On June 19, Sawa and Ishikawa met in the "Final Master and Pupil Showdown" main event singles match, which was won by Ishikawa. On August 21, Sawa teamed with Yujiro Yamamoto in a tag team main event, where they defeated Manabu Suruga and Seiken. Following the match, Sawa announced that he would be retiring from professional wrestling following Battlarts' dissolution. On November 5, 2011, at Battlarts' final event, Sawa defeated Manabu Suruga via submission.

=== Pro Wrestling Zero1 (2005–2011) ===
Early on in his career, Sawa created himself an alter ego, Lingerie Mutoh, a comedy persona based on Keiji Mutoh. As Lingerie Mutoh, Sawa dressed in a bald cap, fake facial hair and women's lingerie and adopted all of Keiji Mutoh's signature moves and mannerisms, often performing them in an exaggerated manner for comedic effect. Sawa, as Lingerie Mutoh, made his debut for Pro Wrestling Zero1-Max (Zero1-Max) on August 20, 2005, when he teamed with Haruka Matsuo in an intergender tag team match, where they defeated Amazing Kong and Fugofugo Yumeji. Sawa worked several intergender matches alongside and against Kong for the rest of the month. On January 24, 2006, Sawa made his first Pro Wrestling Zero1-Max appearance under his real name, losing to Osamu Namiguchi in a singles match. Sawa and Namiguchi wrestled two rematches during the next two months; the first, on February 24, was won by Sawa, and the second, on March 28, by Namiguchi. In June, Sawa formed a short-lived partnership with Gentaro, which led to him receiving his first title shot in Zero1-Max, when the two unsuccessfully challenged Ikuto Hidaka and Minoru Fujita for the NWA International Lightweight Tag Team Championship on June 26. After spending some time away from Zero1-Max, Sawa returned on September 29 to unsuccessfully challenge Minoru Fujita for the AWA World Junior Heavyweight Championship. Sawa began making more regular appearances for Zero1-Max in May 2007, when he joined forces with Ikuto Hidaka, Minoru Fujita and Takuya Sugawara to battle Dick Togo's villainous Far East Connection (FEC) stable in Zero1-Max's junior heavyweight division. The rivalry lasted until August 2, when Sawa, Fujita and Sugawara were defeated in a six-man tag team match by Togo, Masaaki Mochizuki and Tatsuhito Takaiwa. On September 3, Sawa wrestled his up to that point highest profile match in Zero1-Max, when he unsuccessfully challenged Takao Omori for the AWA World Heavyweight Championship. On September 25, Sawa entered his first Tenkaichi Jr. tournament, defeating Chad Malenko in his first round match. Three days later, Sawa was eliminated from the tournament in the second round by Dick Togo. At the end of the year, on December 2, Sawa unsuccessfully challenged Ikuto Hidaka for the AWA World Junior Heavyweight Championship.

In the beginning of 2008, most of Zero1-Max's roster was split up into two opposing camps; Masato Tanaka's Sword Army and Takao Omori's Axe Army. Sawa, along with old acquaintance Ikuto Hidaka decided to join the Sword Army and went on to represent the stable in several matches against members of their rival stable. On July 20, Sawa and Hidaka unsuccessfully challenged Axe Army representatives Minoru Fujita and Takuya Sugawara for the NWA International Lightweight Tag Team Championship. A rematch between the two teams took place on August 3 in Korakuen Hall, where Sawa and Hidaka were victorious, becoming the new NWA International Lightweight Tag Team Champions. Sawa and Hidaka made their first successful defense on August 31 in Battlarts, defeating Yuki Ishikawa and Yuta Yoshikawa. On October 28, Sawa won a one-night qualifying tournament to earn a spot in the 2008 Tenkaichi Jr. tournament. After defeating Takuya Sugawara in his opening round match, Sawa was eliminated from the 2008 Tenkaichi Jr. in the semifinals by Tatsuhito Takaiwa, who went on to win the entire tournament. On December 17, Sawa again unsuccessfully challenged his tag team partner Ikuto Hidaka for the Zero1 International Junior Heavyweight Championship. On February 7, 2009, Sawa and Hidaka made their second successful defense of the NWA International Lightweight Tag Team Championship, first in Zero1, against Great Sasuke and Osamu Namiguchi. Sawa continued teaming with Hidaka throughout 2009, with the two making successful title defenses against the teams of Katsumi Usuda and Minoru, Minoru Fujita and Yusaku Obata, Speed of Sounds (Hercules Senga and Tsutomu Oosugi), and previous champions Minoru Fujita and Takuya Sugawara. On October 24, Sawa and Hidaka defeated Kamikaze and Kohei Sato to win the NWA Intercontinental Tag Team Championship, becoming double tag team champions. In December, Sawa and Hidaka took part in the 2009 Furinkazan, a tag team tournament featuring both junior heavyweight and heavyweight wrestlers. After two wins and one draw, Sawa and Hidaka were defeated in the final day of the tournament by old rivals Minoru Fujita and Takuya Sugawara and, as a result, finished second in their round-robin block, narrowly missing the finals of the tournament. On January 27, 2010, Sawa and Hidaka lost the NWA Intercontinental Tag Team Championship to the 2009 Furinkazan winners, Akebono and Shinjiro Otani. The two then resumed defending the NWA International Lightweight Tag Team Championship, defeating Dragon Gate representatives Masaaki Mochizuki and Super Shisa on February 28, and American promotion Chikara representatives The Osirian Portal (Amasis and Ophidian) on May 8. Finally, after a reign of 766 days, the longest in the title's history, and eight successful defenses, Sawa and Hidaka lost the NWA International Lightweight Championship to Kaijin Habu Otoko and Takuya Sugawara on September 8, 2010.

Later in September, Sawa again made it to the semifinals of the Tenkaichi Jr. tournament, before losing to tag team partner Ikuto Hidaka. In the 2010 Furinkazan, Sawa opted to team with DDT Pro-Wrestling (DDT) and Pancrase representative Hikaru Sato instead of Hidaka. However, with a record of one win and three losses, the team finished nowhere near a place in the finals. Despite their unimpressive tournament, Sawa and Sato received a shot at the NWA International Lightweight Tag Team Championship on January 1, 2011, but were unable to dethrone Kaijin Habu Otoko and Takuya Sugawara. On March 6 at Zero1's tenth anniversary event, Sawa attempted to win his first singles title in the promotion, but was defeated by Craig Classic in his match for the NWA World Junior Heavyweight Championship. On March 27, Sawa reunited with Ikuto Hidaka for a rematch for the NWA International Lightweight Tag Team Championship, but the two were again defeated by Otoko and Sugawara. On June 14, Sawa took part in Dick Togo's Zero1 retirement match, where he, Fujita "Jr." Hayato and Masato Tanaka were defeated by Togo, Funaki and Ikuto Hidaka. On September 14, Sawa entered the 2011 Tenkaichi Jr. tournament with a win over Takuya Sugawara. After defeating Susumu Yokosuka in the semifinals, Sawa defeated Fujita "Jr." Hayato on September 17 to win the tournament. As a result, Sawa received another shot at the NWA World Junior Heavyweight Championship, however, this time Zero1's version of the title, on October 2, but was again defeated by Craig Classic. On November 6, the day after the folding of Battlarts, Sawa wrestled his retirement match as Lingerie Mutoh, losing to World Wonder Ring Stardom (Stardom) representative Yoshiko. Three days later, Sawa was defeated by longtime tag team partner Ikuto Hidaka in his professional wrestling retirement match. At the end of the year, Zero1 fans voted Sawa the 2011 MVP.

=== Various promotions (2005–2011) ===
From 2005 to 2009, Sawa made a couple of appearances per year for DDT, where he went on to become a two-time Ironman Heavymetalweight Champion as Lingerie Mutoh. In 2010, Sawa began working more regularly for the promotion under his real name, winning the Ironman Heavymetalweight Championship two more times, before he and Sanshiro Takagi defeated Kudo and Yasu Urano on February 11, 2010, to win the KO-D Tag Team Championship. On July 4, Sawa also unsuccessfully challenged Danshoku Dino for the DDT Extreme Division Championship. After twelve successful defenses and a reign of 199 days, Sawa and Takagi lost the KO-D Tag Team Championship to Danshoku Dino and Shiro Koshinaka on August 29 in a three-way match, which also included Mikami and Thanomsak Toba. Sawa returned to DDT on June 4, when he and Shigehiro Irie defeated Gentaro and Yasu Urano to win the KO-D Tag Team Championship. The team's reign would last only fifteen days, before they lost the title to Kenny Omega and Michael Nakazawa in their first title defense. On July 24 at Ryōgoku Peter Pan 2011, DDT's largest annual event, Sawa and Sanshiro Takagi defeated Great Sasuke and Ricky Fuji to win the Greater China Unified Zhongyuan Tag Team Championship. On November 4, 2011, Sawa returned one last time to DDT, teaming with Sanshiro Takagi in a 59-minute three-way tag team match, where they defeated Choun Shiryu and Danshoku Dino, and Brahman Kei and Brahman Shu to retain the Greater China Unified Zhongyuan Tag Team Championship. During his years in DDT, Sawa also performed on the promotion's New Beijing Pro Wrestling (NBPW) events, working as Lee Ranjei, a Chinese version of his Lingerie Mutoh persona.

On June 10, 2006, Sawa made his first and only appearance for All Japan Pro Wrestling (AJPW), taking part in a nine-man battle royal, during which he, as Lingerie Mutoh, got in the ring for the first time with Keiji Mutoh.

From 2007 to 2011, Sawa also made several appearances for women's wrestling promotion Ice Ribbon, mainly working against the other male wrestlers in the promotion, including Choun Shiryu, Ribbon Takanashi, Mr. Gannosuke, and Gentaro, but also going opposite female wrestlers like Makoto, Miyako Matsumoto, Hikari Minami, and the promotion's founder Emi Sakura. On May 5, 2011, Sawa and Makoto made it to the finals of the first annual Go! Go! Golden Mixed Tag Tournament, before losing to the team of Makoto Oishi and Neko Nitta.

On June 29, 2007, Sawa wrestled on the first ever match held by the Inoki Genome Federation (IGF), defeating Yuki Ishikawa. The following year, Sawa remained undefeated in IGF with wins over Atsushi Sawada and Kazuhiro Tamura. Sawa returned to IGF on February 22, 2010, defeating Akira Joh. On September 25, Sawa suffered his first loss in IGF, when he was defeated by Chris Daniels. On April 28, 2011, Sawa wrestled his first tag team match in IGF, where he and Taka Kunoh were defeated by Akira Joh and Hideki Suzuki. After wrestling Joh to a fifteen-minute time limit draw on July 10, Sawa made his final IGF appearance on September 3, 2011, losing to Yuichiro☆Jienotsu☆Nagashima.

On January 15, 2008, Sawa made his debut for Dragon Gate (DG), when he, Dick Togo and Ikuto Hidaka unsuccessfully challenged Don Fujii, K-Ness and Masaaki Mochizuki for the Open the Triangle Gate Championship. On February 10, Sawa and Fujita "Jr." Hayato won Dragon Gate's one night Buyuden Cup Tag Tournament. Sawa returned to Dragon Gate on March 22, 2010, when he unsuccessfully challenged Super Shisa for the Open the Brave Gate Championship in a three-way match, which also included Genki Horiguchi.

=== United States and Germany (2010–2011) ===
On January 16, 2010, Sawa made his American debut, when he took part in Evolve's first ever event in Rahway, New Jersey, defeating T. J. Perkins via submission. On March 5, Sawa made his debut for German promotion Westside Xtreme Wrestling (wXw), entering the annual 16 Carat Gold Tournament in Oberhausen. After defeating Paul Tracey in his first round match, Sawa was eliminated from the tournament in the following day's quarterfinals by Big van Walter, who went on to win the entire tournament. On the third and final day of the tournament, Sawa unsuccessfully challenged Zack Sabre Jr. for the wXw World Lightweight Championship.

On September 11, 2010, Sawa returned to the United States to take part in Evolve 5, losing to the WWE-bound Bryan Danielson in the main event of the evening. At the end of the year, Evolve fans voted Sawa's match with Perkins as the Breakout Match of the Year, while his match with Danielson was named the Match of the Year. While Sawa was in the United States, he also took part in an event held by Kaiju Big Battel in New York City.

On January 15, 2011, Sawa returned to Westside Xtreme Wrestling, when he and Hikaru Sato unsuccessfully challenged Oberhausen Terror Corps (Bad Bones and Carnage) for the wXw World Tag Team Championship. The following day, Sawa entered the Ambition 2 tournament. After wins over Tommy End and Hikaru Sato, Sawa was defeated in the finals of the tournament by Rico Bushido. Sawa returned to Kaiju Big Battel in on October 14, 2011, taking part in an event in Brooklyn, New York.

=== Post-retirement (2011–present) ===
Although he formally retired from professional wrestling in 2011, Sawa has since made occasional appearances in wrestling rings. On March 26, 2016, Sawa made his return to professional wrestling by taking part in Kenji Takeshima's retirement event. In what was billed as an "exhibition match", Sawa wrestled Takeshima to a ten-minute time limit draw.

On March 20, 2017, Sawa made an appearance at DDT's 20th anniversary event, taking part in the Ironman Heavymetalweight and King of Dark Championship battle royal, from which he and Ken Ohka were the last men eliminated by Guanchulo. On August 20, Sawa made another appearance for DDT at the 2017 Ryōgoku Peter Pan event, where he worked as Lingerie Mutoh, defeating Gota Ihashi in a dark match. On September 3, he took part in a falls count anywhere five-way tag team match in which he debuted the gimmick of Ippanjin Munenori Sawa (一般人・澤宗紀, Ippanjin Sawa Munenori; lit. "Ordinary person Munenori Sawa") at DDT's Campsite Wrestling 2017 event. He continued to use this gimmick in DDT, Michinoku Pro, P.P.P., and Wrestling of Darkness 666.

On April 5, 2018, Sawa returned to America, teaming with Daisuke Sekimoto to unsuccessfully challenge Timothy Thatcher and Walter at Evolve 102.

== Personal life ==
Sawa currently works as a fitness trainer in the Tokyo area. He is employed by a gym called FLENJI which is owned by close friend and former tag team partner, Ikuto Hidaka.

== Championships and accomplishments ==
=== Professional wrestling ===
- DDT Pro-Wrestling

- Greater China Unified Zhongyuan Tag Team Championship (2 times) – with Sanshiro Takagi
- Ironman Heavymetalweight Championship (4 times)
- KO-D Tag Team Championship (2 times) – with Sanshiro Takagi (1) and Shigehiro Irie (1)

- Dragon Gate

- Open the Owarai Gate Championship (1 time)
- Buyuden Cup Tag Tournament (2008) – with Fujita "Jr." Hayato

- Evolve

- Breakout Match (2010) vs. T. J. Perkins on January 16
- Match of the Year (2010) vs. Bryan Danielson on September 11

- Japan Indie Awards

- MVP Award (2011)

- Pro Wrestling Zero1

- NWA Intercontinental Tag Team Championship (1 time) – with Ikuto Hidaka
- NWA International Lightweight Tag Team Championship (1 time) – with Ikuto Hidaka
- Tenkaichi Junior (2011)
- Tenkaichi Jr. Qualifying Tournament (2008)
- MVP Award (2011)

- Underground Wrestling Exit

- WUW World Underground Championship (2 times)

- Total Triumph Team

- TTT Indie Unified Six Man Tag Team Championship (1 time) – with Fuminori Abe and Takuya Nomura

=== Submission grappling ===
- Combat Wrestling

- 80 kg Class Tournament (2005)

=== Mixed martial arts record ===
Professional record breakdown
1 match	0 wins	1 loss
By knockout	0	1
By submission	0	0
By decision	0	0
Draws	0	

Res.	Record	Opponent	Method	Event	Date	Round	Time	Location	Notes
Loss	0–1	Takeshi Ono	TKO (strikes)	Tribelate: Vol. 10	May 21, 2006	1	2:55	Tokyo, Japan	
