= Union Max Championship =

Professional wrestling championship

- The Union Max Championship belt

Details
- Promotion: Pro-Wrestling Basara
- Date established: October 23, 2013
- Current champion: Takumi Tsukamoto
- Date won: August 2, 2026

Other name
- Union Pro Max Championship
Statistics
- First champion: Ivan Markov
- Most reigns: Isami Kodaka (5 reigns)
- Longest reign: Minoru Fujita (357 days)
- Shortest reign: Isami Kodaka (12 days)
- Oldest champion: Shuji Ishikawa (50 years, 3 months and 3 days)
- Heaviest champion: Ivan Markov (227 lb (103 kg))
- Lightest champion: Masahiro Takanashi (154 lb (70 kg))

The Union Max Championship (Japanese: ユニオンMAX王座, Hepburn: Yunion Makkusu Ōza) is a professional wrestling championship and the top singles accomplishment in the Japanese promotion Pro-Wrestling Basara. The title was established in 2013.

== History ==
Union Pro Wrestling was a promotion that was revived by DDT Pro-Wrestling in 2005. The Union Max Championship was established in 2013 when Ivan Markov defeated Shuji Ishikawa to become the inaugural champion. In January 2016, three days after folding, Union was replaced by a new promotion named Pro-Wrestling Basara. The title was reactivated when Isami Kodaka defeated Trans-Am★Hiroshi to win his third title. The original belt design is still used which bears the "Union" name on it.

== Reigns ==
As of September 24, 2026, there have been a total of 25 reigns shared among 15 different wrestlers. Takumi Tsukamoto is the current champion in his third reign.

Key
No.	Overall reign number
Reign	Reign number for the specific champion
Days	Number of days held
Defenses	Number of successful defenses
+	Current reign is changing daily

No.	Champion	Championship change			Reign statistics			Notes	Ref.
No.	Champion	Date	Event	Location	Reign	Days	Defenses	Notes	Ref.
(DDT) DDT Pro-Wrestling: Union Pro Wrestling (UPW)
1	Ivan Markov	December 11, 2013	Shiwasu no Union 2013	Tokyo, Japan	1	102	4	Defeated Shuji Ishikawa in a decision match to become inaugural champion.	
2	Isami Kodaka	March 23, 2014	Union no March 2014	Kawasaki, Japan	1	56	0		
3	Hikaru Sato	May 18, 2014	Golden Union 2014	Tokyo, Japan	1	213	3		
4	Fuma	December 17, 2014	Shiwasu no Union 2014	Tokyo, Japan	1	256	3		
5	Isami Kodaka	August 30, 2015	Natsu Matsuri Union 2015	Tokyo, Japan	2	35	1		
—	Deactivated	October 4, 2015	Union 10th Anniversary Show	Tokyo, Japan	—	—	—	Title retired when Union Pro Wrestling closed down.	
(DDT) DDT Pro-Wrestling: Pro-Wrestling Basara
6	Isami Kodaka	December 25, 2016	Basara 25	Tokyo, Japan	3	12	0	Defeated Trans-Am★Hiroshi to resurrect the title.	
7	Fuma	January 6, 2017	Basara 26	Tokyo, Japan	2	76	1		
8	Trans-Am★Ryuichi	March 23, 2017	Tavern Pro Wrestling: Alcohol Mania 2017	Tokyo, Japan	1	192	3		
9	Isami Kodaka	October 1, 2017	Basara 48	Tokyo, Japan	4	214	5		
10	Naoki Tanizaki	May 3, 2018	Basara 66	Tokyo, Japan	1	141	2	This was also for Tanizaki's Dove World Heavyweight Championship.	
11	Ryota Nakatsu	September 21, 2018	Basara 78	Tokyo, Japan	1	227	2		
12	Ryuichi Sekine	May 6, 2019	Basara 95	Tokyo, Japan	1	181	2		
13	Masahiro Takanashi	November 3, 2019	Ultimate Party 2019	Tokyo, Japan	1	142	2		
Pro-Wrestling Basara
14	Fuminori Abe	March 24, 2020	Basara 125	Tokyo, Japan	1	231	4		
15	Takumi Tsukamoto	November 10, 2020	Basara 139	Tokyo, Japan	1	348	6		
16	Ryota Nakatsu	October 24, 2021	Basara 173	Tokyo, Japan	2	240	6		
17	Isami Kodaka	June 21, 2022	Basara 195	Tokyo, Japan	5	280	5		
18	Banana Senga	March 28, 2023	Basara 214	Tokyo, Japan	1	46	1		
19	Takumi Tsukamoto	May 13, 2023	Basara 218	Tokyo, Japan	2	108	1		
20	Fuma	August 29, 2023	Basara 227	Tokyo, Japan	3	131	2		
21	Minoru Fujita	January 7, 2024	Basara 239	Tokyo, Japan	1	357	7		
22	Masato Kamino	December 29, 2024	Basara 264	Tokyo, Japan	1	63	1		
23	Ryota Nakatsu	March 2, 2025	Basara 272	Tokyo, Japan	3	301	5		
24	Shuji Ishikawa	December 28, 2025	Basara 296	Tokyo, Japan	1	217	4		
25	Takumi Tsukamoto	August 2, 2026	Basara 313	Tokyo, Japan	3	53+	2		

== Combined reigns ==
As of September 24, 2026.

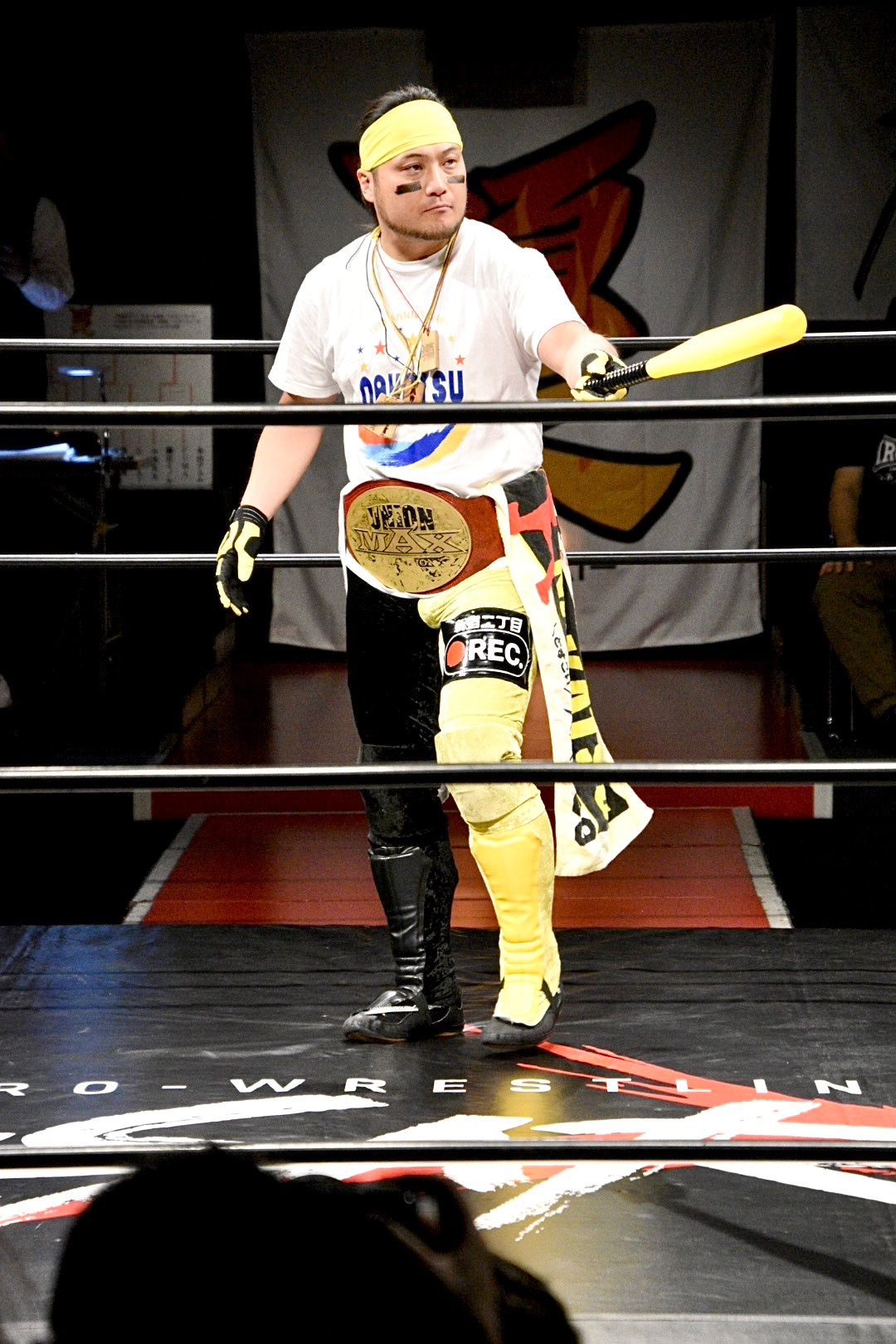
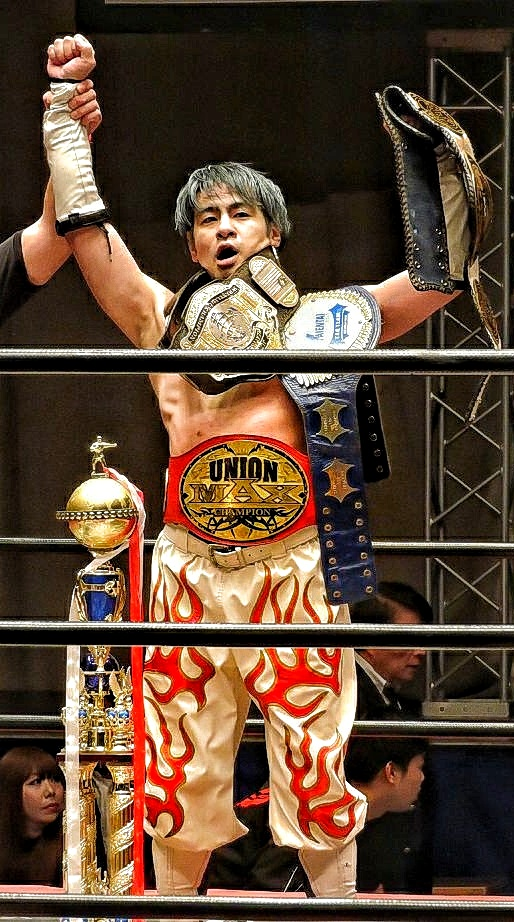
Three-time champion Ryota Nakatsu (left) and record five-time champion Isami Kodaka (right) both shown with different versions of the title.

†	Indicates the current champion

Rank	Wrestler	No. of reigns	Combined defenses	Combined days
1	Ryota Nakatsu	3	13	768
2	Isami Kodaka	5	11	597
3	Takumi Tsukamoto †	3	9	509+
4	Fuma	3	6	463
5	Minoru Fujita	1	7	375
6	Fuminori Abe	1	4	231
7	Shuji Ishikawa	1	4	217
8	Hikaru Sato	1	3	213
9	Trans-Am★Ryuichi	1	3	192
10	Ryuichi Sekine	1	2	181
11	Naoki Tanizaki	1	2	144
12	Masahiro Takanashi	1	2	142
13	Ivan Markov	1	4	102
14	Masato Kamino	1	1	63
15	Banana Senga	1	1	46

== See also ==
- Professional wrestling in Japan
