= Masa Takanashi =

Japanese professional wrestler (born 1983)

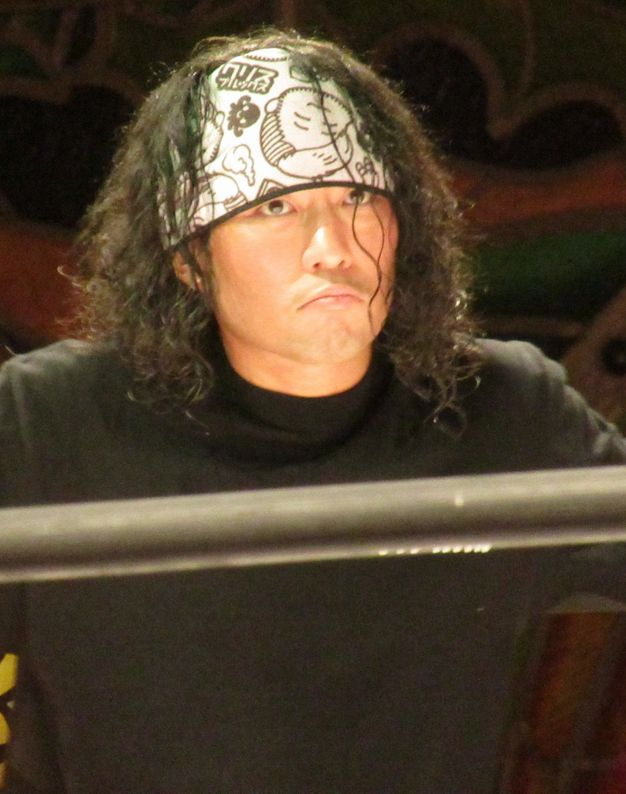
- Takanashi in September 2023

Personal information
- Born: Masahiro Takanashi; January 22, 1983 (age 43) Ichikawa, Chiba

Professional wrestling career
- Ring name(s): King Pocota; Louis Takanashi XIV; Masa Daka Mamushi; Masa de Bali; Masahiro Mekanashi; Masahiro Takanashi; Masako Takanashi; Masa Saito DNA; Masa Takanashi; Monster Army B NoSpeaking Monkey; Pocoda Takanashi; Poco Takanashi; Ribbon Takanashi; Samoa Takanashi; Son Goku; Tappuri! Tarako Man
- Billed height: 1.70 m (5 ft 7 in)
- Billed weight: 70 kg (154 lb)
- Trained by: Último Dragón; DDT dojo
- Debut: September 14, 2003

Masahiro Takanashi (高梨 将弘, Takanashi Masahiro; born January 22, 1983) is a Japanese professional wrestler, also known by the ring name Masa Takanashi (マサ高梨). Takanashi was trained by Dramatic Dream Team (DDT) and has worked for the promotion since his debut in September 2003, becoming a one-time KO-D Openweight Champion, a two-time KO-D Tag Team Champion, a seven-time KO-D 6-Man Tag Team Champion, a two-time DDT Extreme Champion, an 18-time Ironman Heavymetalweight Champion and a one-time UWA World Trios Champion. Takanashi is also known for his work in women's wrestling promotion Ice Ribbon, where he performed under the ring name Ribbon Takanashi (リボン高梨, Ribon Takanashi) and became a one-time International Ribbon Tag Team and Triangle Ribbon Champion.

== Professional wrestling career ==
=== Dramatic Dream Team / DDT Pro-Wrestling (2003–present) ===
Takanashi was first trained in professional wrestling by Último Dragón at his Último Dragón Gym. After failing to graduate from his class, Takanashi moved to the training dojo of the Dramatic Dream Team (DDT) promotion. From August 19 to September 6, 2003, Takanashi wrestled several exhibition matches for DDT, before making his official debut for the promotion on September 14, where he, now working under the shortened ring name Masa Takanashi (spelled in western naming order [given name first]), was defeated by Super Uchu Power. For the rest of the year, Takanashi wrestled mostly opening matches, picking up his first win on December 29, when he pinned Daichi Kakimoto in a six-man tag team match. In early 2004, Takanashi began regularly teaming with Danshoku Dino. On May 29, Takanashi defeated Shoichi Ichimiya in the first round for the inaugural King of DDT tournament. The following day, he was eliminated from the tournament in the semifinals by Danshoku Dino. From April to May 2005, Takanashi represented DDT in Kaientai Dojo's K-Metal League, where he failed to make it to the finals. Upon his return to DDT, Takanashi began wrestling as a representative of DDT's Cruiser's Game project. In January 2006, Takanashi was, in storyline, brought under the spell of Poison Sawada Julie and turned into a human snake. Takanashi would wrestle as a member of Julie's Snake Corps, before managing to break away from the group in May, along with Seiya Morohashi. On June 25, Takanashi won his first championship, when he, working as Masahiro Mekanashi, a character inspired by the Mecha Mummy, defeated Mecha Stanley for the Ironman Heavymetalweight Championship. Takanashi then entered a battle royal, where he lost the title to Natsuki☆Head, before regaining it from Mikami and then losing it to Mecha Mummy. Also in 2006, Takanashi made his debut for El Dorado Wrestling, where he worked alongside his Último Dragón Gym training partners as King Pocota. The character then moved to DDT, where he was renamed Poco Takanashi and won the Ironman Heavymetalweight Championship two more times, each time holding the title less than a day. On November 23, Takanashi won his first major title, when he and Seiya Morohashi defeated Francesco Togo and Mori Bernard for the KO-D Tag Team Championship. After a five-month reign, Takanashi and Morohashi lost the title to Michael Nakazawa and Tomomitsu Matsunaga on April 1, 2007. After returning to performing as Masa Takanashi, he defeated Danshoku Dino and Kudo in a three-way match on February 20, 2008, to win the DDT Extreme Championship. He would go on to lose the title to Francoise Takagi on July 6. During the summer of 2008, Takanashi formed the "Belt Hunter×Hunter" stable with Danshoku Dino, Hikaru Sato, Keisuke Ishii and Tigers Mask. The stable's storyline rivalry with the Italian Four Horsemen stable built to an eight-man tag team match on December 28, 2008, where the loser of the fall would be banished from DDT. The match ended with Horsemen member Antonio Honda pinning Takanashi for the win; as a result, Takanashi was, in storyline, forced to leave DDT.

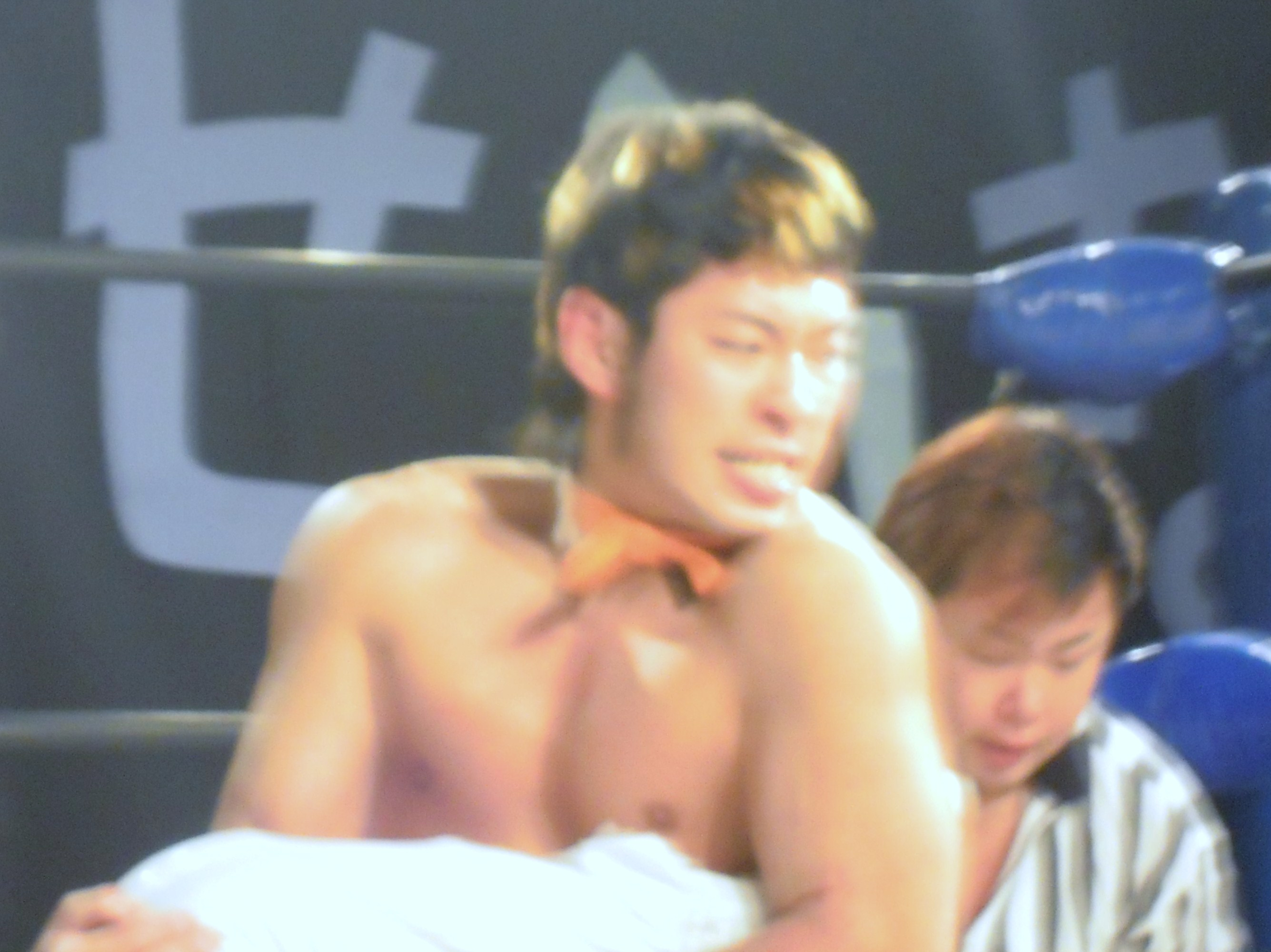
Takanashi in March 2010

Despite the storyline, Takanashi did not miss a single event held by DDT as in January 2009, he began making appearances for the promotion as Louis Takanashi XIV. On May 21, Takanashi earned his way back into DDT by defeating Sanshiro Takagi in a singles match. During the summer of 2009, Takanashi won four different titles, the DJ Nira World and History's Strongest Championship, the GAY World Anal Championship, the J.E.T. World Jet Championship and the World Mid Breath Championship, all made up by different DDT wrestlers and none of which were officially recognized by the promotion. This built to a nine championship match between Takanashi and Danshoku Dino on August 23, which Dino won to retain his five titles and win Takanashi's four titles. Before the end of the year, Takanashi and Dino reformed the Belt Hunter×Hunter stable. On November 29, Takanashi, Dino and Hikaru Sato defeated the Italian Four Horsemen (Antonio Honda, Francesco Togo and Piza Michinoku) to become the first DDT-promoted UWA World Trios Champions. On January 24, 2010, they lost the title to Tokyo Gurentai (Fujita, Mazada and Nosawa Rongai). On March 14, Takanashi won a fifteen-man battle royal to become the number one contender to DDT's top title, the KO-D Openweight Championship. At the following event on March 21, Takanashi defeated Munenori Sawa to win the Ironman Heavymetalweight Championship for the fifth time. He would lose the title to Danshoku Dino six days later in a four-way match, which also included fellow Belt Hunter×Hunter members Hikaru Sato and Keisuke Ishii. Takanashi received his shot at the KO-D Openweight Championship on April 4, but was defeated by defending champion Daisuke Sekimoto, who outweighed him by 50 kg (110 lb). The match was recognized as one of the best matches on the Japanese independent circuit in all of 2010 and is considered Takanashi's breakthrough performance. On May 12, DDT announced that Takanashi would be sidelined from in-ring action indefinitely after dislocating his right knee, tearing his anterior cruciate ligament and damaging his medial collateral ligament.

Though still unable to wrestle due to his injury, Takanashi resumed working storylines around the Ironman Heavymetalweight Championship in May 2011. Takanashi wrestled his return match on June 19, 2011, and before the end of the month, won the Ironman Heavymetalweight Championship for the eleventh time. On July 24, Takanashi recruited former opponent, Daisuke Sekimoto, as his tag team partner and together the two of them defeated Harashima and Hero!, Gentaro and Yasu Urano, and Kenny Omega and Michael Nakazawa in a four-way match to become the new KO-D Tag Team Champions. The comedic big man/little man team would lose the title to Homoiro Clover Z (Danshoku Dino and Kota Ibushi) on August 28. On October 23, Takanashi won a sixteen-person rock-paper-scissors tournament to become the number one contender to the KO-D Openweight Championship, but would be defeated in the title match on November 6 by the defending champion, Kudo. On December 3, Takanashi made his American debut, when took part in the Indie Summit 2011, promoted by Combat Zone Wrestling (CZW), in Philadelphia, Pennsylvania, wrestling in a three-way match, which was won by Kudo and also included Dick Togo. Later that same day, Takanashi appeared on CZW's internet pay-per-view, Cage of Death 13, wrestling in a ten-man tag team match, where he, Jaki Numazawa, Jun Kasai, Kamui and Yoshihito Sasaki were defeated by Danshoku Dino, Kengo Mashimo, Kudo, Ryuji Ito and Takashi Sasaki. In early 2012, Takanashi began feuding with the Homoiro Clover Z stable. After leading fellow DDT Seikigun members Daisuke Sasaki and Harashima to a six-man tag team victory over Homoiro Clover Z on March 11, the stable's leader, the reigning KO-D Openweight Champion Danshoku Dino, named Takanashi and Sanshiro Takagi his top two contenders for the title. On March 18, Takanashi was defeated by Takagi in a number one contender's main event. On April 1, Takanashi took part in the annual Anytime and Anywhere battle royal, a match combining elements of a regular battle royal and a ladder match, where he managed to grab the "Right to Challenge Anytime, Anywhere" contract to earn the right to challenge for the KO-D Openweight Championship at a time of his own choosing. Later that same event, Takanashi used his contract, after Sanshiro Takagi had defeated Danshoku Dino to win the KO-D Openweight Championship, and defeated him to become the new champion. On May 4, Takanashi lost the KO-D Openweight Championship to Yuji Hino in his first title defense, ending his reign at 33 days. On June 24, Takanashi and Daisuke Sasaki received a shot at the KO-D Tag Team Championship, but were defeated by the defending champions, Homoiro Clover Z representatives Kudo and Makoto Oishi. On July 8, Takanashi and Sasaki joined Antonio Honda, Hoshitango, Yasu Urano and Yuji Hino to form the Monster Army. The group wrestled its first match together on July 22, when they were defeated by Akito, DJ Nira, Poison Julie Sawada, Rion Mizuki and Tetsuya Endo in a ten-man tag team match, after Hino and Hoshitango began brawling with each other. The brawling continued after the match with Takanashi and Sasaki siding with Hoshitango and Honda and Urano with Hino, which led to Takanashi announcing that the Monster Army was history and that he, Sasaki and Hoshitango were now known as "Familia". Later that same day, Takanashi made a special appearance for Pro Wrestling Noah, facing former training partner Taiji Ishimori in a losing effort. On August 18 at DDT's 15th anniversary event in Nippon Budokan, Takanashi, Daisuke Sasaki, Hoshitango, Tetsuya Endo and Tsukasa Fujimoto, representing Familia, defeated Antonio Honda, Tanomusaku Toba, Yasu Urano, Yoshiko and Yuji Hino, representing Crying Wolf, in a ten-person tag team match, contested under "Soccer rules".

On August 26, DDT General Manager Amon Tsurumi ordered all stables in the promotion disbanded, effectively ending the short-lived Familia. On September 19, Daisuke Sasaki turned on Takanashi and formed a new stable named "Los Calientes" with Antonio Honda, who simultaneously turned on Yasu Urano, and Hoshitango. Takanashi responded by announcing that he was forming his own stable with Toru Owashi and Yuji Hino and going after Los Calientes. The two stables faced off on September 30, however, during the match Hino turned on Takanashi, which led to Hoshitango pinning him for the win. Following the match, Honda announced that he, Hoshitango, Sasaki and Hino were reforming the Monster Army, claiming that Takanashi and Urano were the ones who ruined the original stable. Takanashi returned to title contention on June 13, 2013, when he unsuccessfully challenged Kenny Omega for the DDT Extreme Championship. Ten days later, Takanashi took part in a nine-man battle royal, during which he won the Ironman Heavymetalweight Championship from Gorgeous Matsuno for the twelfth time, only to lose it to Tomomitsu Matsunaga nine seconds later. Takanashi then resumed his rivalry with his former Monster Army stablemates, which built to an eight-man tag team match on August 17, during the first day of DDT's 16th anniversary weekend in Ryōgoku Kokugikan, where he, Akito, Kazuki Hirata and Yukio Sakaguchi defeated Antonio Honda, Daisuke Sasaki, Hoshitango and Yuji Hino. On December 17, Takanashi produced his tenth anniversary event in Tokyo's Tobu Friend Hall, which saw him lose to Kudo in the main event. On January 13, 2014, Takanashi won a four-way match to earn the right to challenge for the Ironman Heavymetalweight Championship whenever and wherever he wanted. He used the right later that same event, surprising DDT Triple Crown Champion Harashima with a schoolboy after his match to become the new Ironman Heavymetalweight Champion. On January 26, Takanashi put his new title on the line in a ten-minute battle royal. Early on in the match, Takanashi lost the title to Tomomitsu Matsunaga, but later came back to defeat Yasu Urano, regain the title and leave the match as the reigning champion. Following the main event, Takanashi came out to challenge Harashima for the KO-D Openweight Championship, but was then surprised by Urano, who pinned him to become the new Ironman Heavymetalweight Champion. On February 2, Takanashi failed to recapture the title from Urano in a match billed as a KO-D Openweight Championship number one contender's match. However, following the match, Takanashi revealed that he and Emi Sakura had tricked DDT General Manager Amon Tsurumi into signing a contract making him the number one contender, regardless of the result of the match. Takanashi received his title shot on February 23, but was defeated by the defending champion, Harashima.

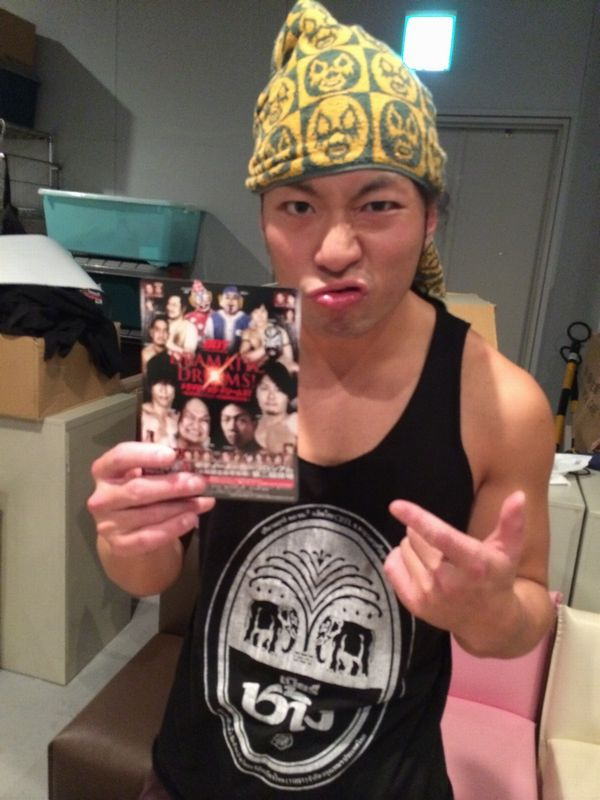
Takanashi in April 2014

On March 2, Takanashi formed a new stable with Kudo and Yukio Sakaguchi, based on the three's shared love of alcohol. On March 9, the stable was named Shuten-dōji, after a sake drinking oni of the same name. On March 21, Takanashi won his second "Right to Challenge Anytime, Anywhere" contract in the annual battle royal. However, after Kudo captured the KO-D Openweight Championship later in the main event, Takanashi announced he would not be betraying his "brother" and using the contract. After holding the contract for only nine days, Takanashi lost it to Kazuki Hirata after being pinned by him in a ten-man tag team match. In April, Shuten-dōji announced they were taking over DDT and every one of its championships with Takanashi being assigned with capturing the DDT Extreme Championship as well as the KO-D 6-Man Tag Team Championship alongside his stablemates. The first title match took place on May 4 and saw Shuten-dōji defeat Daisuke Sasaki, Kenny Omega and Kota Ibushi to capture the KO-D 6-Man Tag Team Championship. Shuten-dōji's takeover of DDT continued on May 9, when Takanashi defeated Danshoku Dino to win the DDT Extreme Championship for the second time. Takanashi's reign lasted only sixteen days, before he lost the title to Makoto Oishi on May 25. On June 8, Shuten-dōji made their first successful defense of the KO-D 6-Man Tag Team Championship against Smile Squash (Akito, Harashima and Yasu Urano). They lost the title to Happy Motel (Antonio Honda, Konosuke Takeshita and Tetsuya Endo) in their second defense on July 13. Shuten-dōji, however, regained the title from Happy Motel just seven days later in a three-way match, which also included Team Drift (Keisuke Ishii, Shigehiro Irie and Soma Takao). They lost the title to Team Drift on August 17 at DDT's largest event of the year, Ryōgoku Peter Pan 2014. On February 15, 2015, Shuten-dōji won the KO-D 6-Man Tag Team Championship for the third time, defeating previous champions Genpatsu Daio (Brahman Kei, Brahman Shu and Gorgeous Matsuno). Shuten-dōji then entered a series of matches with Team Drift, where the KO-D 6-Man Tag Team Championship changed hands between the two teams three times in six weeks with Shuten-dōji losing the title on March 1, winning it on March 21, and losing it again on April 11. On July 5, Takanashi received a shot at the DDT Extreme Championship, but was defeated by the defending champion, Akito, in a Bullrope match. Takanashi received another shot at the title on August 23 at Ryōgoku Peter Pan 2015, but was this time defeated by Antonio Honda. On January 3, 2016, Takanashi was named the number one contender to the KO-D Openweight Championship, after pinning Harashima in a six-man tag team match. He was defeated in the title match on January 31 by Isami Kodaka. On July 17, Takanashi announced he was returning to working under his real name of Masahiro Takanashi. On December 11, Takanashi, Kudo and Sakaguchi defeated Damnation (Daisuke Sasaki, Mad Paulie and Tetsuya Endo) to win the KO-D 6-Man Tag Team Championship for the fifth time. They lost the title to Kazusada Higuchi, Kouki Iwasaki and Mizuki Watase in a three-way match, also involving Antonio Honda, Konosuke Takeshita and Trans-Am★Hiroshi, on January 22, 2017. Takanashi, Kudo and Sakaguchi won the KO-D 6-Man Tag Team Championship for a record-tying sixth time on June 25, 2017, by defeating NωA (Makoto Oishi, Mao and Shunma Katsumata). They were stripped of the title on October 10, when Kudo was sidelined with a concussion. Following Kudo's return, Shuten-dōji won the title for the seventh time by defeating All Out (Akito, Diego and Konosuke Takeshita) on December 10.

=== Ice Ribbon (2006–2012) ===
On October 15, 2006, Takanashi, working under the ring name Ribbon Takanashi, made his debut for the newly founded women's professional wrestling promotion, Ice Ribbon, teaming with Makoto in a losing effort against the team of Choun Shiryu and Riho. Takanashi has wrestled for the promotion regularly ever since, becoming the only male wrestler to hold a regular spot in its roster, while also helping Emi Sakura in training wrestlers for the promotion. On July 29, 2008, Takanashi won his first title in Ice Ribbon, when he, working under his transvestite character Masako Takanashi, teamed with Chounko to defeat Etsuko Mita and Makoto for the International Ribbon Tag Team Championship, with the two becoming the first male wrestlers to have held the title. On October 24, they lost the title to Riho and Yuki Sato in their first defense. Returning to the Ribbon Takanashi ring name, Takanashi, teaming with Emi Sakura, attempted to regain the title from Riho and Sato on November 15, but the two were unsuccessful in their challenge.

After recovering from his ACL injury, Takanashi, still unable to wrestle, returned to Ice Ribbon on June 15, 2011, losing the Ironman Heavymetalweight Championship to Emi Sakura. Later that day, after title changes involving Remi Nagano and Hikari Minami, Takanashi regained the title from Sakura and returned to DDT with it. In September, Takanashi began wrestling regularly in three-way matches, which built to a match on November 30, where he defeated Neko Nitta and Makoto Oishi to win the Triangle Ribbon Championship, becoming the first male wrestler to have held the title. Takanashi made his first title defense on January 4, 2012, at Shinshun Ribbon, defeating Miyako Matsumoto and Yasu Urano. On January 25, Takanashi lost the title back to Neko Nitta in a three-way match, which also included Miyako Matsumoto. On May 5 at Golden Ribbon 2012, Takanashi teamed with Kurumi in the second annual Go! Go! Golden Mixed Tag Tournament. After defeating the teams of Hamuko Hoshi and Hoshitango and Dynasty and Hikari Minami in the first two rounds, Takanashi and Kurumi defeated Maki Narumiya and Masamune in the finals to win the tournament. Takanashi wrestled his to date final Ice Ribbon match on July 21, when he defeated Tetsuya Endo in a singles match. Afterwards, Takanashi worked as a play-by-play commentator for Ice Ribbon's 19 O'Clock Girls ProWrestling program on Ustream until late 2012. Takanashi then began working regularly for Emi Sakura's new Gatoh Move Pro Wrestling promotion.

=== Singapore Pro Wrestling (2016–2017, 2022) ===
Takanashi debuted in SPW in 2016. At SPW Wrestling City Asia, Takanashi defeated Andruew Tang to become the second SPW Southeast Asian Champion. He held the belt for 71 days, until he lost it to Tang in a three-way match against Cima. In 2017, Takanashi would return to SPW to face Kaiser Trexxus for the SEA Championship, ultimately losing. In November 2022, Takanashi returned to SPW alongside Chris Brookes to face the Horrors on Day 1 of SPW X: Astronomical Anniversary. CDK defeated The Horrors, winning the SPW Southeast Asian Tag Team Championships. On Day 2, Takanashi was in a four-way match against Tajiri, Tang and Aiden Rex, ultimately losing.

=== Injury and rehabilitation (2025-present) ===
On March 20, 2025, at DDT Judgement 2025, Takanashi suffered a severe injury during a main event match against Chris Brookes. He was unable to move and carried out of the ring on a stretcher. DDT announced on March 22 that he was "diagnosed with cervical vertebrae C5 and C6 fracture and cervical spinal cord injury," underwent a successful surgery, and continued to be treated in the intensive care unit. On April 29, DDT shared a statement from Takanashi that he had been moved from intensive care and had begun rehabilitation: "I have now been moved to the general ward and I just started on rehabilitation. Right now I am at the stage where I am just moving the tips of my toes, but I hope that I will be able to meet you all again one day as I continue to work on my recovery."

== Championships and accomplishments ==
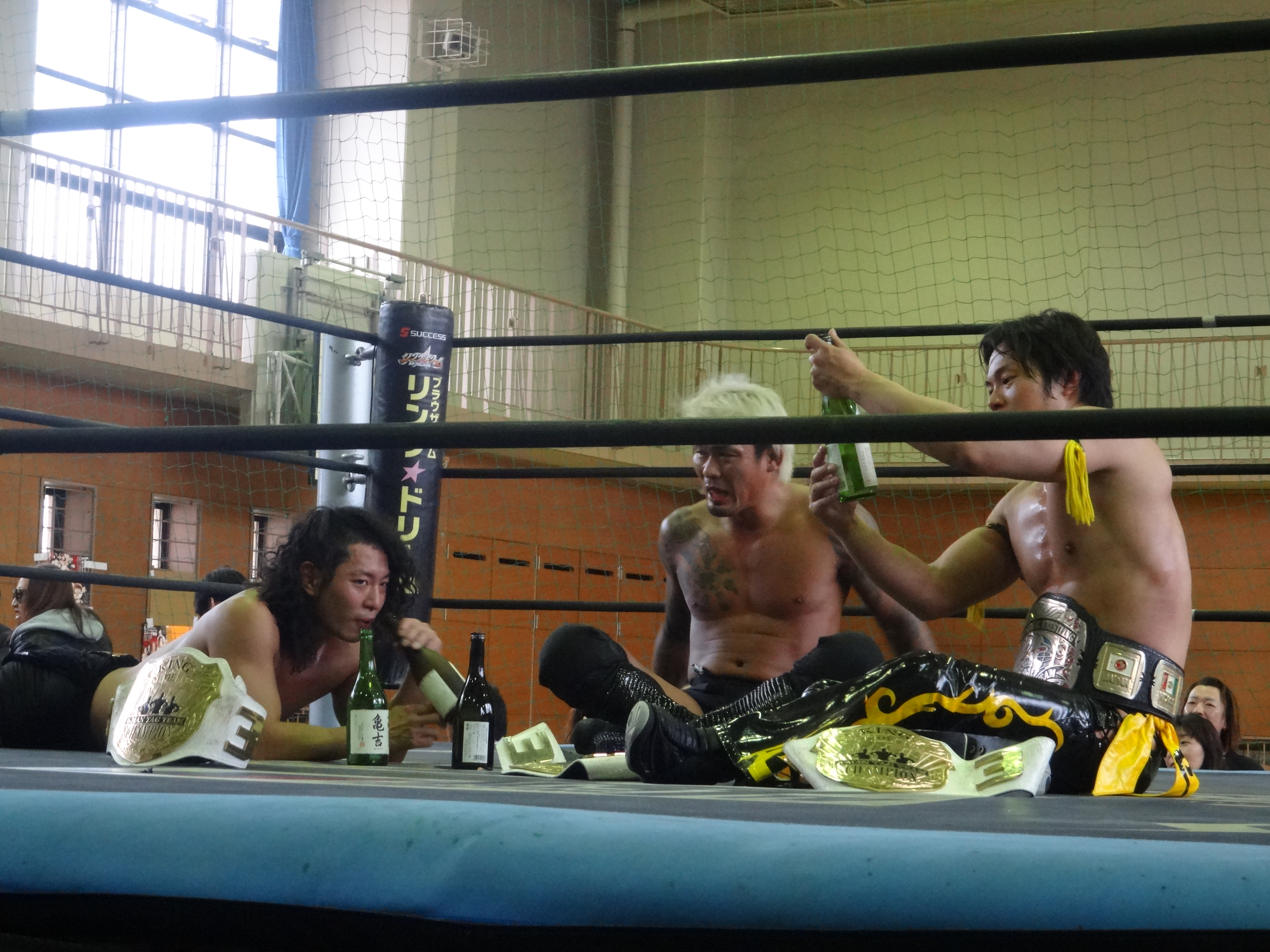
(Left to right) Takanashi, Yukio Sakaguchi and Kudo, Shuten-dōji, as the KO-D 6-Man Tag Team Champions in May 2014

- Dramatic Dream Team/DDT Pro-Wrestling

- DDT Extreme Championship (2 times)
- DDT Universal Championship (1 time)
- DJ Nira World and History's Strongest Championship (1 time)
- GAY World Anal Championship (1 time)
- Ironman Heavymetalweight Championship (18 times)
- JET World Jet Championship (1 time)
- KO-D 6-Man Tag Team Championship (7 times) – with Kudo and Yukio Sakaguchi
- KO-D 10-Man Tag Team Championship (1 time) – with Antonio Honda, Takayuki Ueki, Mecha Mummy and Takeshi Masada
- KO-D Openweight Championship (1 time)
- KO-D Tag Team Championship (3 times) – with Seiya Morohashi (1), Daisuke Sekimoto (1) and Chris Brookes (1)
- Union Max Championship (1 time
- UWA World Trios Championship (1 time) – Danshoku Dino and Hikaru Sato
- World Midbreath Championship (1 time)
- World Ōmori Championship (1 time, current)
- KO-D Openweight Championship Contendership Tournament (2011)
- One Night 6-Man Tag Team Tournament (2017) – with Kudo and Yukio Sakaguchi
- Right to Challenge Anytime, Anywhere Contract (2012, 2014)
- MVP Award (2012)

- Gatoh Move Pro Wrestling

- Asia Dream Tag Team Championship (3 times) – with Emi Sakura (2) and Chris Brookes (1)
- Gatoh Nueng Climax (2013)

- Ice Ribbon

- International Ribbon Tag Team Championship (1 time) – with Choun-ko
- Triangle Ribbon Championship (1 time)
- Go! Go! Golden Mixed Tag Tournament (2012) – with Kurumi

- Japan Indie Awards

- Best Bout Award (2010) vs. Daisuke Sekimoto on April 4

- Setup Thailand Pro Wrestling

- Setup Thailand Openweight Championship (1 time)
- IWA Japan Setup World Tag Team Championship (1 time) – with Chris Brookes

- Singapore Pro Wrestling

- SPW South East Asian Championship (1 time)
- SPW Southeast Asian Tag Team Championship (1 time) – with Chris Brookes

- Style-E

- Style-E Openweight Championship (1 time)
