= Sanshiro Takagi =

Japanese professional wrestler (born 1970)

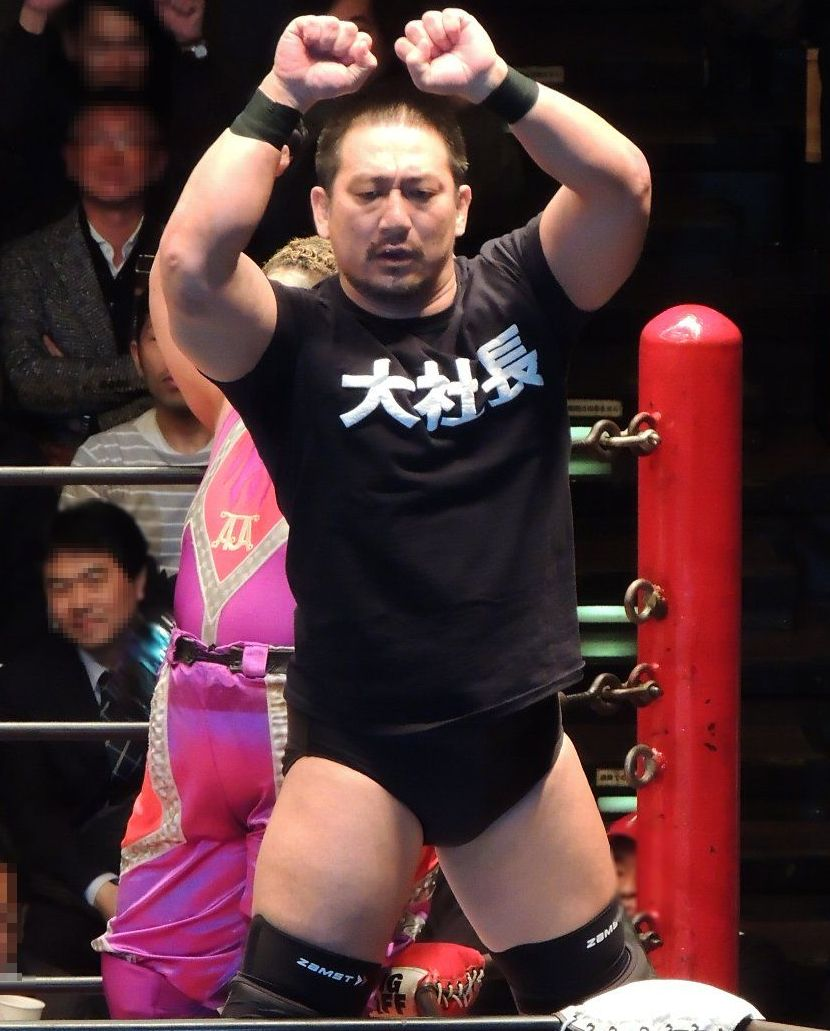
- Takagi in 2014

Personal information
- Born: Tadashi Takagi; January 13, 1970 (age 56) Toyonaka, Osaka, Japan

Professional wrestling career
- Ring names: Dai Kotei Sanshiro; Mr. Strawberry; Nagachika Narita; Sanshiro Takagi; Toyotomi Hideyoshi; Up Up Machine
- Billed height: 1.75 m (5 ft 9 in)
- Billed weight: 105 kg (231 lb)
- Trained by: Mitsuhiro Matsunaga
- Debut: February 16, 1995

Tadashi Takagi (髙木 規, Takagi Tadashi; born January 13, 1970 in Toyonaka, Japan), better known by his ring name Sanshiro Takagi (髙木 三四郎, Takagi Sanshirō), is a Japanese professional wrestler and promoter who works for the Japanese wrestling promotion CyberFight, where he serves as executive vice president. He is one of the founding members and current chairman of United Japan Pro Wrestling. Takagi is the founder of DDT Pro-Wrestling, which is now part of the CyberFight umbrella. As a wrestler, Takagi's gimmick is that he is Stone Cold Steve Austin.

== Early life ==
Takagi was born on January 13, 1970, in Toyonaka, Osaka. In middle school, he joined the school's judo club where he practiced wrestling techniques and bumps. After graduating from high school, he attended Komazawa University, where he eagerly attended professional wrestling matches due to the lack of a student wrestling club. In 1988, he queued up overnight to buy tickets for the Newborn UWF's launch event. Influenced by Akira Maeda's victory over Gerard Gordeau at the third Newborn UWF event, he briefly learned sambo from Konosuke Hagiwara. In his third year of university, his interest shifted from wrestling to television. He joined the university's "TV Program Research Society", and became involved as a studio audience member and extra. Inspired by the idea of hosting events, he successfully organized an event in Shibaura that attracted 3,000 people while still a student.

== Professional wrestling career ==
Takagi was drawn back to professional wrestling by working as a PR staff member for Yokohama's Yatai Village Wrestling. In March 1994, after extended studies, he graduated from university and joined the International Pro Wrestling revival promotion IWA Kakutō Shijuku in August, while still participating in Yatai Village Wrestling. He had matches in Yatai Village Wrestling, debuting against Chotaro Kamoi on December 31, although Yatai Village Wrestling did not keep official records. Therefore, his official debut is often considered to be at the February 16, 1995 Pro Wrestling Crusaders (PWC) Stray Dog Legend event in Shibuya, against Troubleshooter Kochi.

In 1996, Takagi joined PWC but soon became a freelancer. That year, he ran as a Liberal League candidate in the 41st general election for the House of Representatives in Kanagawa 9th District but was not elected.

In 1997 he formed Dramatic Dream Team (DDT). This new promotion established in Tokyo would be based on the entertainment wrestling style of the World Wrestling Federation. Since then Takagi's show has gained a cult following as an alternative version of American-style entertainment wrestling.

On May 5, 2015, Takagi was announced as the new chief executive officer (CEO) of Wrestle-1. He also continued serving as the president of DDT, while being involved with Wrestle-1's management. Starting on April 1, 2017, Takagi served in the role of an advisor to new president Kaz Hayashi. In March 2017, Wrestle-1 underwent a change in management, which led to Takagi assuming the new role of an advisor, from which he resigned the following September.

On September 1, 2017, DDT was sold to the CyberAgent company. Takagi retained his position as the company's president.

On July 15, 2019, at Wrestle Peter Pan 2019, Takagi won the inaugural O-40 Championship by defeating Super Sasadango Machine. On September 29, at Who's Gonna Top? 2019, he lost the title to Gorgeous Matsuno.

On July 27, 2020, DDT and Pro Wrestling Noah merged to form CyberFight. Takagi became president of the new company, commenting that Noah founder Mitsuharu Misawa once saved DDT by giving DDT wrestlers a chance to perform at Noah events, and that he wanted to make both DDT and Noah world-class promotions.

On September 18, 2023, Takagi faced Minoru Suzuki in an "Anywhere Fall Match" held aboard a bullet train traveling between Tokyo and Nagoya. The match concluded with Suzuki defeating Takagi after delivering a Gotch-style piledriver.

On May 16, 2024, it was announced that Takagi would be stepping down as president of CyberFight to assume the position of executive vice president on June 1. As part of the move, Takagi also changed the spelling of his ring name from 高木 to 髙木. (Note: 髙木 is the actual spelling of Takagi's birth name written with the hyōgai kanji 髙 instead of the more common 高, which was used in his ring name.) The new president become Yasuo Okamoto.

On July 21, 2024, at Wrestle Peter Pan 2024, Takagi faced Danshoku Dino in the Ironman Heavymetalweight Championship Weapon Rumble Match. This marked Takagi's final bout before beginning an indefinite hiatus from his role as a wrestler, though he remains involved in the company as a vice president.

== Personal life ==
His wife is Kayako Takagi, who actually helped him out backstage and on-screen in DDT storylines in 2004. His daughter, Rei Takagi, is a former Ironman Heavymetalweight Champion.

== Championships and accomplishments ==
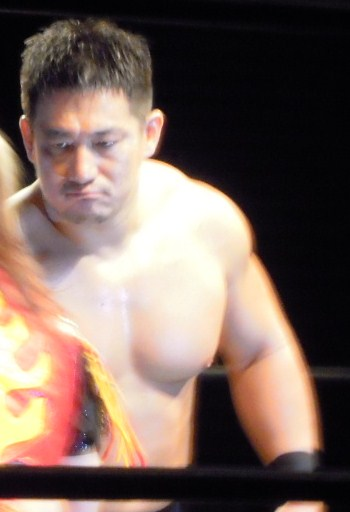
Takagi in 2010.

- DDT Pro-Wrestling

- DDT Extreme Championship (2 times)
- Greater China Unified Zhongyuan Tag Team Championship (2 times) – with Munenori Sawa
- Ironman Heavymetalweight Championship (19 times)
- Jiyūgaoka 6-Person Tag Team Championship (2 times) – with Etsuko Mita and Hero! (1) and Jun Inomata and Poison Sawada (1)
- King of Dark Championship (1 time)
- KO-D 6-Man Tag Team Championship (4 times) – with Akebono and Toru Owashi (1), and Kazuki Hirata and Toru Owashi (3)
- KO-D 8-Man Tag Team Championship (1 time) – with Yukio Naya, Chikara and Yakan Nabe
- KO-D Openweight Championship (6 times)
- KO-D Tag Team Championship (4 times) – with Tomohiko Hashimoto (1), Ryuji Ito (1), Munenori Sawa (1), and Soma Takao (1)
- O-40 Championship (1 time)
- Sea Of Japan 6-Person Tag Team Championship (1 time) – with Yoshihiro Sakai and O.K. Revolution
- Right to Challenge Anytime, Anywhere Contract (2013, 2019)
- Bakuha Koshien Spring Tag Tournament (2021) – with Yumehito Imanari, Yukio Naya and Atsushi Onita
- Best Unit Award (2012) New World Japan

- Tokyo Gurentai

- Tokyo World Heavyweight Championship (1 time)
