= Judgement 8 =

2004 DDT Pro-Wrestling event

- Promotion: DDT Pro-Wrestling
- Date: March 20, 2004
- City: Tokyo, Japan
- Venue: Velfarre
- Attendance: 750

Judgement chronology
← Previous; 7	Next → 9

Judgement 8 (審判～Judgement 8, Shinpan: Jajimento Eito) was a professional wrestling event promoted by DDT Pro-Wrestling (DDT). It took place on March 20, 2004, in Tokyo, Japan, at the Velfarre discothèque. It was the seventh event under the Judgement name. The event aired domestically on Fighting TV Samurai.

== Storylines ==
Judgement 8 featured six professional wrestling matches that involved different wrestlers from pre-existing scripted feuds and storylines. Wrestlers portrayed villains, heroes, or less distinguishable characters in the scripted events that built tension and culminated in a wrestling match or series of matches.

== Event ==
=== Preliminary matches ===
In the opening match, Hero!, Kenshin and Shuji Ishikawa faced Ken Ohka, Daichi Kakimoto and Masahiro Takanashi. In the end, Hero! performed a diving splash on Ohka then pinned him to win the match.

Then, Yusuke Inokuma defended the Ironman Heavymetalweight Championship against Danshoku Dino in a Rubber Deathmatch (Note: 後無出凄沫血(ゴムデスマッチ), Gomu Desumatchi), in which the two opponents had their crotches linked together by a rubber band attached to their briefs, dubbed Dai Ichin Pāren Seiha (大維チン八連制覇), a play on the "Great Pa-Lien (Unified Eight) Quaking Conquest" (大威震八連制覇, Dai Ishin Pāren Seiha) story arc in Sakigake!! Otokojuku, the manga that inspired Dino's ring name. The goal of the match was to be the first to retrieve the opponent's briefs. The match concluded when Dino hit Inokuma with a Reverse Danshoku Driver and removed his briefs to win the bout and become the 145th Ironman Heavymetalweight Champion.

Next, Tomohiko Hashimoto and Seiya Morohashi faced the team of Mammoth Sasaki and Garuda from Wrestling Marvelous Future. In the end, Sasaki hit the 29-Year-Old (a vertical brainbuster) on Morohashi for the victory.

The fourth match was an 11-on-2 Handicap Captain's Fall Elimination match pitting Sanshiro Takagi and Kamen Shooter Super Rider (accompanied by Exciting Yoshida) against Iron Chef, Shoichi Ichimiya, Uchuu Power A, Shigeo Kato, Chotaro Kamoi, Gargantua, Naoshi Sano, Jakai #1, Nagase Kancho, Fuchicho Karasu and Mr. Blue. In the end, Takagi hit Ichimiya with a stunner to eliminate him and instantly win the match since Ichimiya was the captain of his team.

Next, Poison Sawada Julie defended the KO-D Openweight Championship against Kudo. In the end, Sawada performed a Moai of Easter to win and retain the championship.

=== Main event ===
The main event saw Aka Rangers (Takashi Sasaki and Gentaro) defend the KO-D Tag Team Championship against Suicide Boyz (Mikami and Thanomsak Toba). In the closing moments, Sensei intervened to spit green mist on Toba, allowing Sasaki to hit him with a right arm and pin him for the win.

== Results ==
No.	Results	Stipulations	Times
1	Hero!, Kenshin and Shuji Ishikawa defeated Ken Ohka, Daichi Kakimoto and Masahiro Takanashi	Six-man tag team match	7:33
2	Danshoku Dino defeated Yusuke Inokuma (c)	Rubber Deathmatch for the Ironman Heavymetalweight Championship	9:38
3	Mammoth Sasaki and Garuda defeated Tomohiko Hashimoto and Seiya Morohashi	Tag team match	11:41
4	Sanshiro Takagi (captain) and Kamen Shooter Super Rider (with Exciting Yoshida) defeated Iron Chef, Shoichi Ichimiya (captain), Uchuu Power A, Shigeo Kato, Chotaro Kamoi, Gargantua, Naoshi Sano, Jakai #1, Nagase Kancho, Fuchicho Karasu and Mr. Blue	11-on-2 Handicap Captain's Fall Elimination match	12:10
5	Poison Sawada Julie (c) defeated Kudo	Singles match for the KO-D Openweight Championship	11:46
6	Aka Rangers (Takashi Sasaki and Gentaro) (c) defeated Suicide Boyz (Mikami and Thanomsak Toba)	Tag team match for the KO-D Tag Team Championship	17:48
(c) / – the champion(s) heading into the match
