= Judgement 5 =

2001 DDT Pro-Wrestling event

- Promotion: DDT Pro-Wrestling
- Date: March 28, 2001
- City: Tokyo, Japan
- Venue: Kitazawa Town Hall
- Attendance: 294

Judgement chronology
← Previous; 4	Next → 6

Judgement 5 (審判～Judgement5～, Shinpan: Jajimento Faibu) was a professional wrestling event promoted by DDT Pro-Wrestling (DDT). It took place on March 28, 2001, in Tokyo, Japan, at the Kitazawa Town Hall. It was the fifth event under the Judgement name.

== Storylines ==
Judgement 5 featured five professional wrestling matches that involved different wrestlers from pre-existing scripted feuds and storylines. Wrestlers portrayed villains, heroes, or less distinguishable characters in the scripted events that built tension and culminated in a wrestling match or series of matches.

== Event ==
During the event, at around 2:37 pm, Chotaro Kamoi pinned Shark Tsuchiya to become the 47th Ironman Heavymetalweight Champion.

== Results ==
No.	Results	Stipulations	Times
1	Kengo Takai defeated Issei Fujisawa	Singles match	9:16
2	Mitsunobu Kikujawa defeated "Showa"	Singles match	8:50
3	Poison Sawada Julie and Hebikage defeated Takashi Sasaki and Thanomsak Toba	Tag team match	12:07
4	Super Uchuu Power and Tomohiko Hashimoto defeated Mikami and Osamu Tachihikari	Tag team match	18:52
5	Exciting Yoshida defeated Sanshiro Takagi (with Naomi Susan) (c)	Singles match for the KO-D Openweight Championship	14:26
(c) / – the champion(s) heading into the match
