= Judgement 7 =

2003 DDT Pro-Wrestling event

- Promotion: DDT Pro-Wrestling
- Date: March 15, 2003
- City: Tokyo, Japan
- Venue: Korakuen Geopolis
- Attendance: 683

Judgement chronology
← Previous; 6	Next → 8

Judgement 7 was a professional wrestling event promoted by DDT Pro-Wrestling (DDT). It took place on March 15, 2003, in Tokyo, Japan, at the Korakuen Geopolis. It was the seventh event under the Judgement name. The event aired domestically on Fighting TV Samurai.

== Storylines ==
Judgement 7 featured six professional wrestling matches that involved different wrestlers from pre-existing scripted feuds and storylines. Wrestlers portrayed villains, heroes, or less distinguishable characters in the scripted events that built tension and culminated in a wrestling match or series of matches.

== Event ==
Shoichi Ichimiya wrestled under the name Rigi Choshu (長州リ偽, Chōshū Rigi; spelled with "偽", meaning "fake"), a parody of Riki Choshu.

== Results ==
No.	Results	Stipulations	Times
1	Hero! and Yuki Nishino defeated Thanomsak Toba and Seiya Morohashi	Tag team match	8:50
2	Black Boa defeated Miyuki Maeda	Singles match	2:57
3	Yoshihiro Sakai (c) defeated Issei Fujisawa and O.K. Revolution	Three-way match for the Ironman Heavymetalweight Championship	5:47
4	Super Uchuu Power and Rigi Choshu defeated Mikami and Kudo by submission	Tag team match	14:07
5	Gentaro defeated Tomohiko Hashimoto	Singles match	7:00
6	Sanshiro Takagi defeated Takashi Sasaki	Singles match	16:34
(c) / – the champion(s) heading into the match
