= Exciting Yoshida =

Japanese professional wrestler

Personal information
- Born: July 30, 1964 (age 61) Tokyo, Japan

Professional wrestling career
- Ring name(s): Masanori Yoshida; Exciting Yoshida
- Billed height: 177 cm (5 ft 10 in)
- Billed weight: 93 kg (205 lb)
- Debut: 1994
- Retired: 2010

Katsunori Yoshida (吉田勝則, Yoshida Katsunori) better known by his ring name Exciting Yoshida (エキサイティング吉田, Ekisaitingu Yoshida), is a Japanese professional wrestler currently working as a freelancer and is best known for his time in the Japanese promotion DDT Pro-Wrestling.

== Professional wrestling career ==
=== Early career ===
Yoshida made his professional wrestling debut at SPWF Fierce Fighting First Team WINNER'S, an event promoted by Social Pro Wrestling Federation on November 25, 1994, where he teamed up with Devil Hopper to defeat Dangerous Uchida and another unknown opponent. He made an appearance in Big Japan Pro Wrestling at a house show promoted on December 29, 1995, where he fell short to Yosuke Kobayashi.

=== Dramatic Dream Dream (1997–2001) ===
Yoshida's fame came from his tenure with DDT Pro-Wrestling. At DDT Document DDT on January 16, 2001, he competed in a 25-man battle royal also involving Gentaro, Mikami, Shark Tsuchiya, Nosawa Rongai, Tanomusaku Toba and others.

Yoshida is known to have competed in various of the promotion's signature events such as DDT Judgement. He made his first appearance at the first event under the branch, Judgement 1 where he teamed up with Hiroshi Shimada and Judeisuto to defeat Mitsuo Maeda, Kaminari and Miracle Power. At Judgement 3 on March 20, 1999, he teamed up with Kamen Shooter Super Rider in a losing effort to Super Uchuu Power, Phantom Funakoshi and Tsunehito Naito as a result of a six-man tag team match. At Judgement 4 on March 30, 2000, he teamed up with Mitsunobu Kikuzawa and Sanshiro Takagi to pick up a victory over Masao Orihara, Poison Sawada Black and Masahiko Orihara. At Judgement 5 on March 28, 2001, Yoshida defeated Sanshiro Takagi to win the KO-D Openweight Championship. At Judgement 8 on March 20, 2004, he teamed up with Sanshiro Takagi and Kamen Shooter Super Rider to defeat Shoichi Ichimiya, Mr. Blue, Gargantua, Iron Chef, Shigeo Kato, Chotaro Kamoi, Fuchichu Crow, Nagase Kancho, Naoshi Sano and Uchuu Power A in a 10-on-3 Handicap Captain's Fall Elimination match. At DDT 10th Anniversary: Judgement 2007 on March 11, he won a 5 Minute + α Minute Limitless Battle Royal for the Ironman Heavymetalweight Championship also involving Fushicho Karasu, Kikutaro, Naoshi Sano, Taneichi Kacho and Yuki Miyazaki.

== Championships and accomplishments ==
- Dramatic Dream Team / DDT Pro-Wrestling

- Ironman Heavymetalweight Championship (2 times)
- KO-D Openweight Championship (1 time)
- DDT Trios Tournament (1999) – with Takashi Sasaki and Sanshiro Takagi
