= Killing the Business =

2020 Memoir by Matt and Nick Jackson

Killing the Business: From Backyards to the Big Leagues
- First edition
- Author: The Young Bucks (Matt Jackson and Nick Jackson)
- Language: English
- Genre: Memoir
- Publisher: Dey Street Books
- Publication date: November 17, 2020
- Publication place: United States
- Pages: 270
- ISBN: 0-062-93783-9

Killing the Business: From Backyards to the Big Leagues is a memoir of The Young Bucks, a professional wrestling tag team consisting of brothers Matt Jackson and Nick Jackson. It was first published in 2020.

The book was written by the tag team using their iPhones and chronicles their experiences with wrestling, starting with the two organizing backyard wrestling matches in their home town of Rancho Cucamonga, California. The book then discusses their careers in professional wrestling, including their time on the independent circuit, their big break in joining Pro Wrestling Guerrilla, and their experiences as part of several other professional wrestling promotions, including New Japan Pro-Wrestling, Ring of Honor, and, at the time of the book's publication, All Elite Wrestling.

== Contents ==
The book consists of 270 pages. The chapters alternate between being written by Matt and Nick.

== Reception ==
On the first day that the book was announced, it became the #1 book on Barnes & Noble's bestseller list. The book was met with mostly positive reviews, with Wrestling Observer Newsletter giving it their award for Best Pro Wrestling Book of 2020. A review in Post Wrestling stated that the book "is a very honest and revealing look at a not-so-glamorous life the two led as they climbed the ladder of pro wrestling status." A review on BodySlam.net gave the book a positive review, but criticized the length, stating "if you’re looking for an extremely detailed, deep dive into their careers and family life, you might be a little bit disappointed." Several reviews highlighted the authors' honesty about their financial struggles while in the professional wrestling industry, including their statements about how much they were paid at the various promotions they worked at.

== Championship wins ==
On December 18, 2020, the book won both DDT Pro-Wrestling's Ironman Heavymetalweight Championship and Revolution Eastern Wrestling's Pakistan REW Championship (two titles defended under the 24/7 rule, which can also be comically won by objects) after defeating the previous champion Britt Baker. Baker lost both titles by falling asleep while reading the book, therefore getting "pinned" by the book while reading it. Killing the Business would hold the title for 74 days, before losing it on February 28, 2021, to Lip Hip Shake, a photo book by wrestler Saki Akai.
