= Judgement 6 =

2002 DDT Pro-Wrestling event

- Promotion: DDT Pro-Wrestling
- Date: March 25, 2002
- City: Tokyo, Japan
- Venue: Club Atom
- Attendance: 252

Judgement chronology
← Previous; 5	Next → 7

Judgement 6 (Japanese: 審判～Judgement6, Hepburn: Shinpan: Jajjimento Shikkusu) was a professional wrestling event promoted by DDT Pro-Wrestling (DDT). It took place on March 25, 2002, in Tokyo, Japan, at the Shibuya Club Atom. It was the sixth event under the Judgement name. The event aired domestically on Fighting TV Samurai.

== Storylines ==
Judgement 6 featured six professional wrestling matches that involved different wrestlers from pre-existing scripted feuds and storylines. Wrestlers portrayed villains, heroes, or less distinguishable characters in the scripted events that built tension and culminated in a wrestling match or series of matches.

== Event ==
The dark match was held as a "demo" for the video game Tekken 4 that would be released on console a few days later in Japan. Shoichi Ichimiya wrestled under the name Poison Ichimiya Gyulie (ポイズン一宮偽ュリー, Poizun Ichimiya Gyurī; spelled with "偽", meaning "fake"), a parody of Poison Sawada Julie who wrestled in the main event.

== Results ==
No.	Results	Stipulations	Times
1^{D}	King defeated Tekken-shu	Singles match	3:33
2	Hero! defeated Daisuke Matsumoto	Singles match	6:03
3	Thanomsak Toba, Kentaro Ohka and Gaijin defeated Gentaro, Yoshiya and Issei Fujisawa	Six-man tag team match	10:45
4	Poison Ichimiya Gyulie defeated Hebikage	Singles match	7:34
5	Mikami and Takashi Sasaki (c) defeated Asian Cougar and Onryo	Tag team match for the KO-D Tag Team Championship	14:07
6	Super Uchuu Power and Kintaro Kanemura defeated Sanshiro Takagi and Poison Sawada Julie	Tag team match	17:24
(c) / – the champion(s) heading into the match; D / – this was a dark match
