= Judgement 4 =

2000 DDT Pro-Wrestling event

- Promotion: DDT Pro-Wrestling
- Date: March 30, 2000
- City: Tokyo, Japan
- Venue: Kitazawa Town Hall
- Attendance: 500

Judgement chronology
← Previous; 3	Next → 5

Judgement 4 was a professional wrestling event promoted by DDT Pro-Wrestling (DDT). It took place on March 30, 2000, in Tokyo, Japan, at the Kitazawa Town Hall. It was the fourth event under the Judgement name.

== Storylines ==
Judgement 4 featured five professional wrestling matches that involved different wrestlers from pre-existing scripted feuds and storylines. Wrestlers portrayed villains, heroes, or less distinguishable characters in the scripted events that built tension and culminated in a wrestling match or series of matches.

== Results ==
No.	Results	Stipulations	Times
1	Kengo Takai defeated Shinichi Takada	Singles match	7:29
2	"Showa" defeated Issei Fujiwara	Singles match	5:48
3	Koichiro Kimura and Misae-chan defeated Crusher Takahashi and Casas	Tag team match	12:07
4	Takashi Sasaki and Thanomsak Toba defeated Asian Cougar and Neo Winger	Tag team match	18:58
5	Sanshiro Takagi, Mitsunobu Kikuzawa and Exciting Yoshida defeated Masao Orihara, Poison Sawada Black and Masahiko Orihara	Six-man tag team match	11:56
