= Judgement 3 =

1999 DDT Pro-Wrestling event

- Promotion: DDT Pro-Wrestling
- Date: March 20, 1999
- City: Tokyo, Japan
- Venue: Itabashi Green Hall
- Attendance: 330

Judgement chronology
← Previous; 2	Next → 4

Judgement 3, also known as DDT 2nd Anniversary Show Judgement (DDT旗揚げ2周年記念大会 Judgement, DDT hataage ni shūnen kinen taikai jajjimento), was a professional wrestling event promoted by DDT Pro-Wrestling (DDT). It took place on March 20, 1999, in Tokyo, Japan, at the Itabashi Green Hall. It was the third event under the Judgement name.

== Storylines ==
Judgement 3 featured a kickboxing match and six professional wrestling matches that involved different wrestlers from pre-existing scripted feuds and storylines. Wrestlers portrayed villains, heroes, or less distinguishable characters in the scripted events that built tension and culminated in a wrestling match or series of matches.

== Event ==
The event opened with a kickboxing match and featured an All Japan Women's Pro-Wrestling match-up between Little Frankie and Tomezo Tsunosake. The fourth match also saw the participation of Takashi Uwano from the International Wrestling Association of Japan.

== Results ==
No.	Results	Stipulations	Times
1	Thanomsak Toba defeated Daisaku by knockout	Kickboxing match	2R 1:16
2	Masked Bancho defeated Masked Detective	Singles match	8:15
3	Little Frankie defeated Tomezo Tsunokake	Singles match	4:50
4	Takashi Uwano, Yoshiya Yamashita and Daiyu Shinniwa defeated Kengo Takai, Yusaku and Daisuke Taneichi	Six-man tag team match	11:29
5	Kurokage defeated Yuki Nishino	Singles match	8:48
6	Asian Cougar and Kyohei Mikami defeated Mitsunobu Kikuzawa and Takashi Sasaki	Tag team match	8:48
7	Super Uchuu Power, Phantom Funakashi and Tsunehito Naito defeated Sanshiro Takagi, Exciting Yoshida and Kamen Shooter Super Rider	Six-man tag team match	23:13
