= The Young Bucks =

American professional wrestling tag team

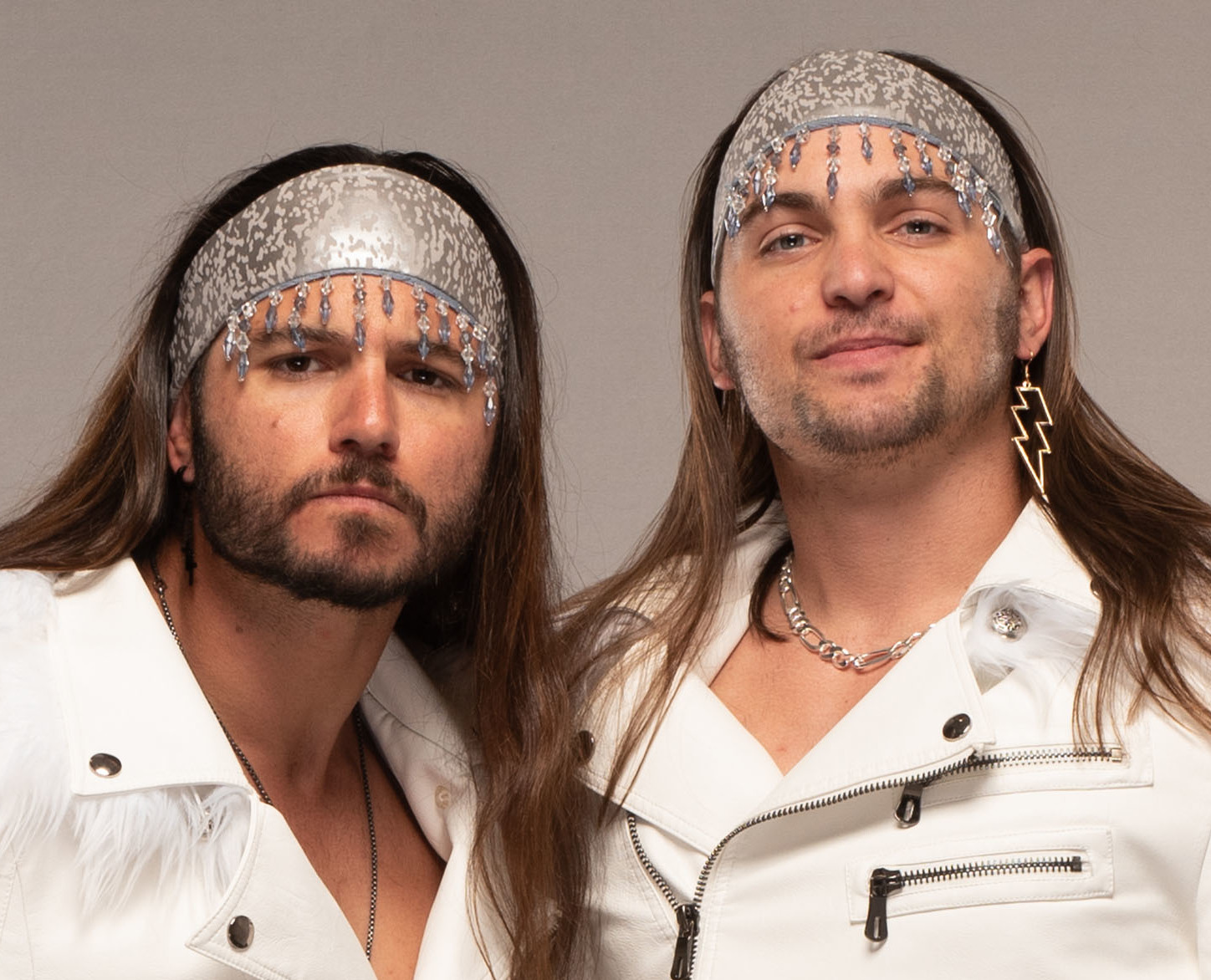
- The Young Bucks, Matt (left) and Nick (right) in 2021
- Born: Matthew Ronjon Massie: March 13, 1985 (age 41); Nicholas Lee Massie: July 28, 1989 (age 37); Montebello, California, U.S.
- Employer: All Elite Wrestling
- Title: Executive Vice President
- Professional wrestling career
- Website: beingtheelite.com
- Ring name(s): The Cucamonga Kids; The Jackson Brothers; Los Gallineros; Max and Jeremy Buck; Matt and Nick Jackson; The Young Bucks; Generation Me; Matthew and Nicholas Jackson
- Billed height: 5 ft 10 in (1.78 m) each
- Billed weight: Matt: 208 lb (94 kg); Nick: 209 lb (95 kg)
- Billed from: Rancho Cucamonga, California
- Trained by: Ron Rivera; Rudos Dojo; Marty Jannetty
- Debut: August 8, 2004

YouTube information
- Channel: Being The Elite
- Years active: 2016–present
- Genres: Vlog; comedy; professional wrestling
- Subscribers: 497 thousand
- Views: 106.1 million
- Last updated: March 12, 2026

The Young Bucks are an American professional wrestling tag team consisting of brothers Matthew Ronjon Massie (born March 13, 1985) and Nicholas Lee Massie (born July 28, 1989), who perform under the ring names Matt Jackson and Nick Jackson. As of January 2019, they are signed to All Elite Wrestling (AEW), where they are also executive vice presidents and co-founders of the company. In AEW, they are the current AEW World Tag Team Champions in their record fourth reign.

The Young Bucks are also known for their work in New Japan Pro-Wrestling (NJPW) and Ring of Honor (ROH), where they became members of the NJPW faction Bullet Club; after a "civil war" in 2018, The Young Bucks, Kenny Omega, Adam Page, Marty Scurll, and Cody Rhodes were kicked out of Bullet Club and went on to form The Elite. They have performed for various American independent promotions – most notably Pro Wrestling Guerrilla (PWG) – and had previously worked for Total Nonstop Action Wrestling (TNA) as Generation Me under the names Max Buck and Jeremy Buck. On the independent circuit, they have won numerous titles as well, including four reigns as PWG World Tag Team Champions as well as being the only team to win PWG's annual Dynamite Duumvirate Tag Team Title Tournament on three occasions (2009, 2011, and 2013).

They have held the IWGP Junior Heavyweight Tag Team Championship seven times, three reigns as ROH World Tag Team Champions, three reigns as NJPW's NEVER Openweight 6-Man Tag Team Champions (twice with Omega and once with Scurll), three reigns as ROH World Six-Man Tag Team Champions (twice with Page and once with Rhodes), and the IWGP Tag Team Championships twice, and the AAA World Tag Team Champions once. They were also the inaugural AEW World Trios Champions with Elite stablemate Omega. All totaled between AEW, ROH, NJPW, and AAA, they have held 10 world tag team championships, seven junior heavyweight tag team championships, and eight six-man/trios championships (with various partners).

They also have made appearances in Total Nonstop Action Wrestling (TNA), Lucha Libre AAA Worldwide (AAA), Revolution Pro Wrestling (RevPro), Juggalo Championship Wrestling (JCW), the National Wrestling Alliance (NWA), Pro Wrestling Guerilla (PWG), Chikara, Defiant Wrestling (Defiant), Global Force Wrestling (GFW), House of Hardcore (HOH), and Combat Zone Wrestling.

== Professional wrestling career ==
=== Training and debut (2001–2004) ===
In 2001, the Massie family put a wrestling ring in their backyard, where brothers Matt, Nick and Malachi taught themselves how to wrestle by impersonating what they saw on television. At the age of 18 or 19, Matt began his professional wrestling training in La Mirada and City of Industry, California, at the Revolution Pro Wrestling School called Rudos Dojo, training primarily under Ron Rivera (The American Wild Child), Disco Machine, Scorpio Sky and Super Dragon, among others. Matt attended the school with his good friend Dustin Cutler, and the two taught what they learned to their friends back home. Eventually Nick joined his brother and attended a few sessions at the school. Matt, Nick and Dustin were involved in their first professional match at an Alternative Wrestling Show/C4/Revolution Pro joint event held on August 8, 2004. Matt worked as Fluffy the Dog, Dustin dressed as a hillbilly and Nick was a high flying referee wearing a Santo mask. Afterward, Matt and Nick wrestled various times for Revolution Pro and Revolution X in chicken costumes, under the team name "Los Gallineros".

=== High Risk Wrestling (2004–2009) ===
In October 2004, with the help of his family, Matt opened up his own independent wrestling company called High Risk Wrestling (HRW). Matt was originally the head owner of HRW, but had help from Nick and Malachi, as well as good friend Dustin Cutler – these three eventually took over ownership years later. The company ran shows twice a month and helped Matt and Nick learn their craft. In the main event of HRW's "Highway 2 Hell" on August 4, 2007, Matt and Nick teamed up with Marty Jannetty ín a six-man tag, where they defeated Joey Ryan, Karl Anderson and Diablo.

On February 26, 2005, at a show for Full Contact Wrestling, Matt and Nick were called "The Young Bucks" for the first time. Originally, Matt was wrestling under the name "Mr. Instant Replay", while Nick was called "Slick Nick". That night The Young Bucks were defeated by the Kaos and Mongol, the Santino Brothers. Later on, another promoter decided that Matt and Nick needed a surname and came up with "Jackson", which the two have used ever since.

With the help of HRW, Matt and Nick eventually landed spots in several popular companies in Southern California. They also gained experience working in front of a camera doing television tapings for the National Wrestling Alliance (NWA) starting in 2006. The Young Bucks filmed their first matches for the NWA on Maverick Television on November 7, 2006, when they were defeated by Anderson and Ryan.

HRW closed in 2009.

=== Pro Wrestling Guerrilla (2007–2018) ===
==== Feud with The Dynasty (2007–2008) ====
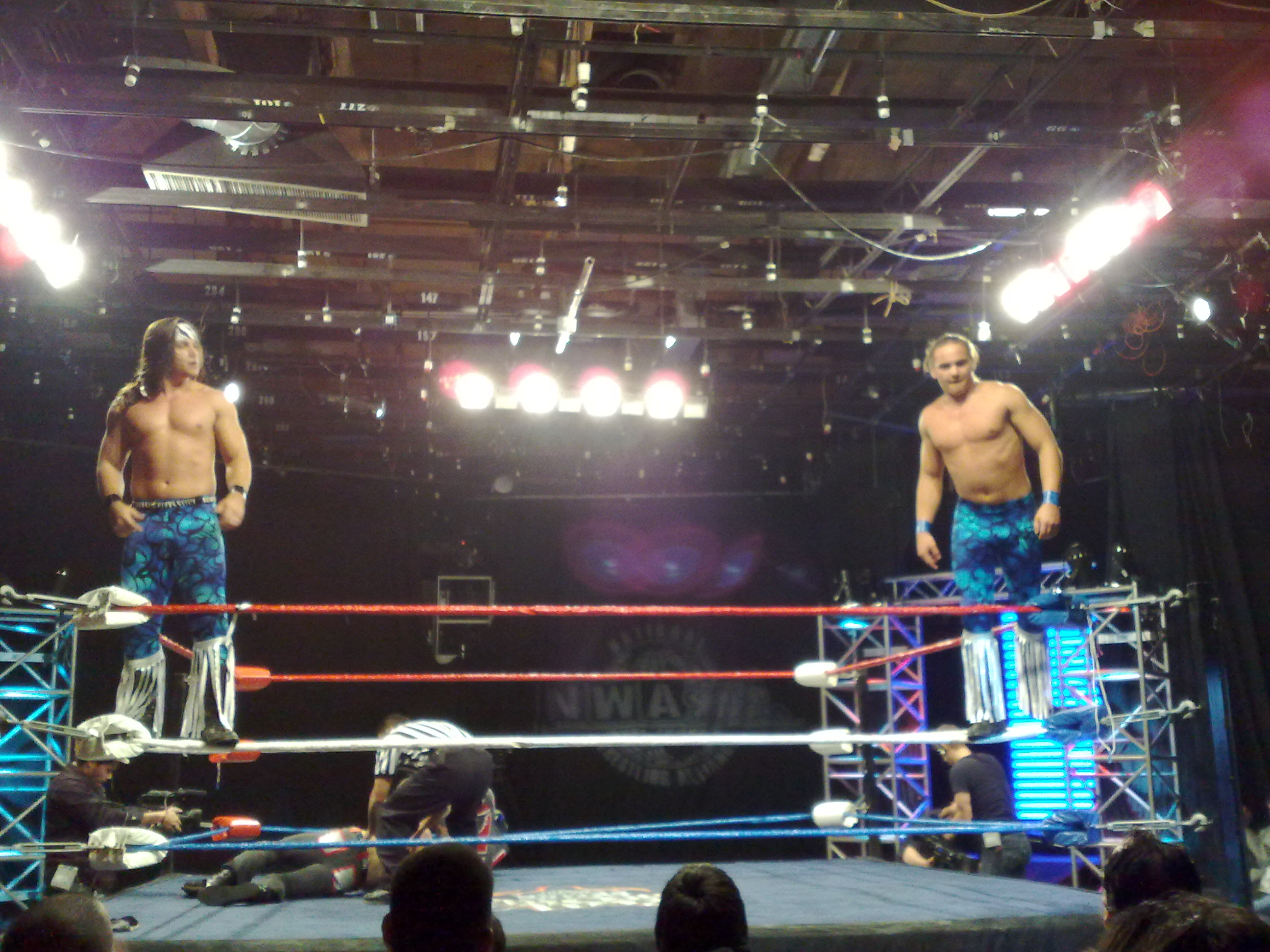
Matt (left) and Nick (right) in 2008

The Young Bucks debuted for Pro Wrestling Guerrilla (PWG) on June 10, 2007, in Burbank, California at Roger Dorn Night, losing to Arrogance (Chris Bosh and Scott Lost). On August 31, 2007, PWG held the first night of the 2007 Battle of Los Angeles tournament, where The Young Bucks picked up their first tag team victory in PWG by defeating Los Luchas (Phoenix Star and Zokre). At the show Matt and Nick met Dragon Gate (DG) wrestler Cima and Dragon Gate's American talent agent Satoshi Oji for the first time, both of whom were impressed by the brothers' performance. On January 5, 2008, The Young Bucks faced prominent Dragon Gate team Muscle Outlaw'z (Naruki Doi and Masato Yoshino) at All Star Weekend 6 – Night 1 in a losing effort. The next night, they lost to The Dynasty (Scott Lost and Joey Ryan).

At the following show, on January 27, the Young Bucks received their first shot at the PWG World Tag Team Championship, but were once again defeated by the Dynasty. During the next two months the Young Bucks participated in the 2008 DDT4 qualifier series, where they lost to T. J. Perkins and Hook Bomberry, defeated Ronin and Scorpio Sky and drew with Los Luchas, before losing a deciding four-way elimination match to Los Luchas, who then advanced to the tournament itself. Soon after, The Young Bucks went on their first Dragon Gate tour. Upon their return from Dragon Gate, the Young Bucks defeated the Dynasty on July 6, 2008, at Life During Wartime, PWG's fifth anniversary show, in a three-way match, which also included Kazma and Miyawaki.

==== World Tag Team Championship reign (2008–2010) ====
At the following show, All Star Weekend 7 – Night Two on August 31, 2008, Matt and Nick defeated Age of the Fall (Jimmy Jacobs and Tyler Black) to become the new PWG World Tag Team Champions. One of The Young Bucks' biggest accomplishments in PWG came at the annual DDT4 tag team tournament on May 22, 2009, in Reseda, California, when they defended the titles three times in one night. They defeated Dustin and Brandon Cutler in the first round, Kenny Omega and Chuck Taylor in the second round and the Hybrid Dolphins (Bryan Danielson and Roderick Strong) in the final round to win the tournament. At that same event their younger brother Malachi made his PWG debut, losing to Phoenix Star. Around that time, after the Young Bucks started touring the World, the PWG crowds started turning on them. On July 31, 2009, at Threemendous II, PWG's sixth anniversary show, the Young Bucks suffered their first loss in the company in sixteen months, losing a non-title match to the re-united 2 Skinny Black Guys (Human Tornado and El Generico). Despite their win and the Young Bucks' wishes, Tornado and Generico never received their rematch for the titles as the following month they lost the number one contendership to The Men of Low Moral Fiber (Kenny Omega and Chuck Taylor), whom the Young Bucks defeated for the titles on October 4 in a rematch of their DDT4 semifinal match.

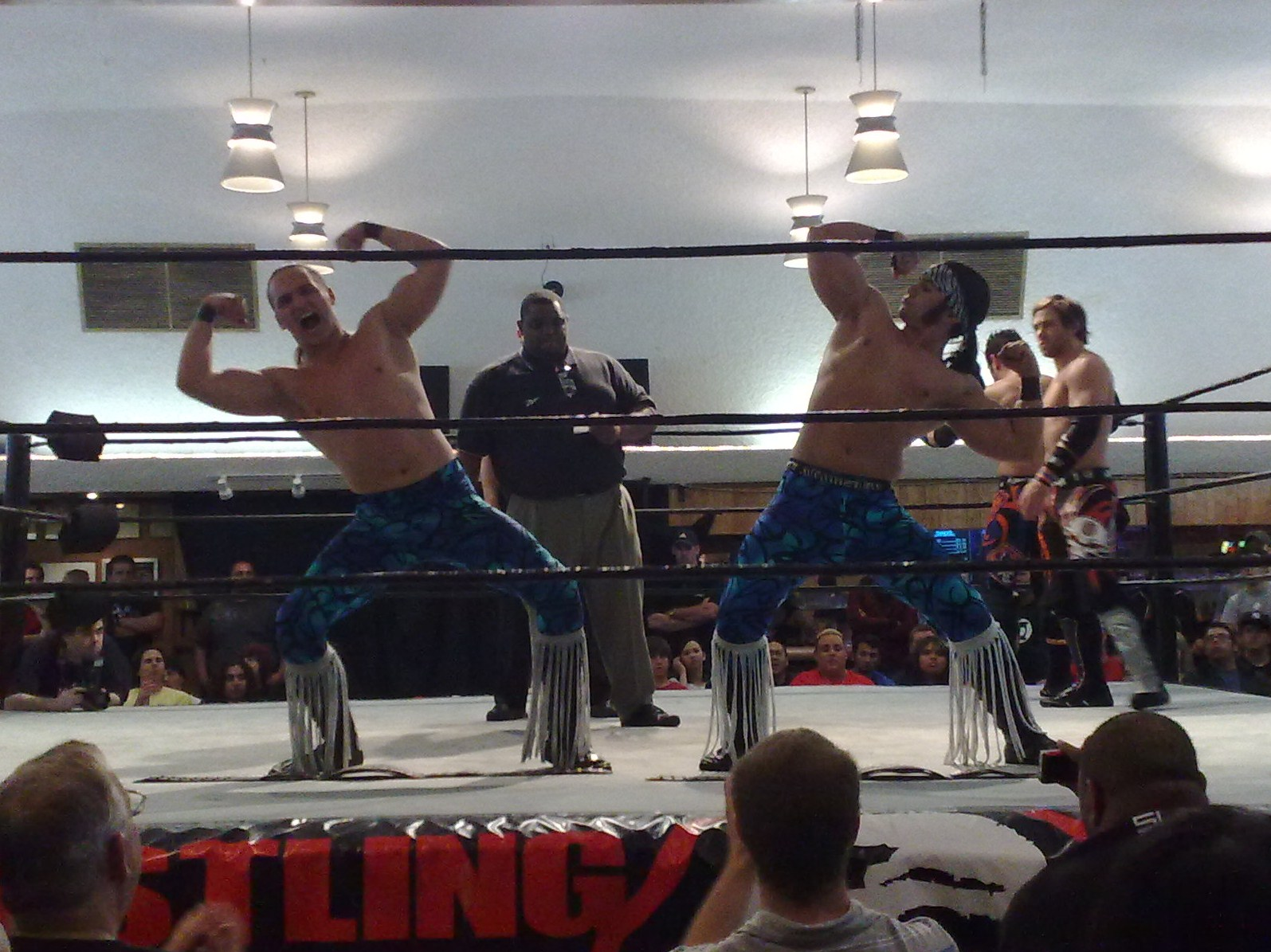
The Young Bucks posing before a Pro Wrestling Guerrilla match in 2009

On November 21, during the second night of the 2009 Battle of Los Angeles, The Young Bucks retained their title over Kevin Steen and El Generico and afterwards turned heel by aligning themselves with Brian Kendrick and attacking the new PWG World Champion Kenny Omega. On January 30, 2010, at Kurt Russellmania, the first PWG show since the Bucks had signed contracts with TNA Wrestling, Matt and Nick announced that from now on they would be known by their TNA names, Max and Jeremy of Generation Me. They turned on Brian Kendrick, only for him to be saved by his old tag team partner Paul London. Later in the night, the team of London and Kendrick defeated Generation Me in a non-title match. Despite the announcement made by the Young Bucks, PWG still continues to refer to them under their original team and singles names.

On April 10, the Young Bucks made PWG history by making their thirteenth successful title defense against the Briscoe Brothers (Jay and Mark). On May 9, the Young Bucks entered the 2010 DDT4 tournament and were for the second year in a row set to defend the Tag Team Championship three times in one night. The Bucks defeated Johnny Goodtime and Jerome Robinson in the first round and the Cutler Brothers in the semifinals of the tournament. However, in the final of the tournament El Generico and Paul London, the team known collectively as ¡Peligro Abejas!, defeated the Young Bucks to not only win the tournament, but also the PWG World Tag Team Championship, ending the Bucks' reign at 616 days. During the final match Nick was knocked unconscious and suffered a concussion, but was able to finish the match.

==== Various feuds (2010–2012) ====
On July 30, at PWG's seventh anniversary show, the Bucks received a rematch for the World Tag Team titles in the first ever tag team Guerrilla Warfare match, a three-way match, also involving the Cutler Brothers, where ¡Peligro Abejas! ended up retaining the Championship. In the first round of the 2010 Battle of Los Angeles, Matt and Nick were paired up against each other, but instead of wrestling the match, they got themselves disqualified by superkicking referee Rick Knox. Afterwards the Cutler Brothers challenged the Young Bucks to a match, in which they finally managed to defeat their nemesis tag team. On March 4, 2011, the Young Bucks entered the 2011 DDT4 tournament, which was this time used to determine new number one contenders to the ¡Peligro Abejas!. In their first round match, the Young Bucks defeated Brandon Gatson and Willie Mack. Later in the evening they defeated the American Wolves (Davey Richards and Eddie Edwards) in the semifinals and finally the Nightmare Violence Connection (Akira Tozawa and Kevin Steen) in the final to win their second DDT4 tournament and earn another shot at El Generico and Paul London. The Young Bucks received their shot on April 9, 2011, when they defeated El Generico and Ricochet, who filled in for Paul London who was unable to appear at the event, to regain the PWG World Tag Team Championship.

On May 27, during the first night of All Star Weekend 8, The Young Bucks made the first successful defense of their second title reign, defeating the RockNES Monsters (Johnny Goodtime and Johnny Yuma). The following night, The Young Bucks defeated Austin Aries and Roderick Strong to retain the title. On August 20, The Young Bucks defeated the Kings of Wrestling (Chris Hero and Claudio Castagnoli) in an unadvertised match to retain the PWG World Tag Team Championship. The Young Bucks made their next title defense on September 10, defeating the Dynasty (Joey Ryan and Scorpio Sky). On October 22, The Young Bucks made their fifth successful title defense by defeating Future Shock (Adam Cole and Kyle O'Reilly), before interfering in the main event and costing Kevin Steen the PWG World Championship in his ladder match with El Generico. After challenging Steen to a handicap Guerrilla Warfare match, Super Dragon made his first appearance in over three years and named himself Steen's partner for the match on December 10. On December 10, The Young Bucks lost the PWG World Tag Team Championship to Appetite for Destruction (Kevin Steen and Super Dragon) in a Guerrilla Warfare match, ending their second reign at 245 days.

Following their title loss, The Young Bucks started a rivalry with Super Smash Bros. (Player Uno and Stupefied); on March 17, the Super Smash Bros. picked up their first PWG win by defeating The Young Bucks in a three-way match, which also included the RockNES Monsters. On April 21, The Young Bucks attempted to win their third DDT4 tournament and earn a rematch with Appetite for Destruction, but suffered another loss against the Super Smash Bros. in their first round match. On May 25, The Young Bucks and the Super Smash Bros. faced each other in a No Disqualification match to determine the new PWG World Tag Team Champions. In the end, The Young Bucks suffered their third straight loss against their rival team. On July 21 at Threemendous III, PWG's ninth anniversary event, The Young Bucks unsuccessfully challenged the Super Smash Bros. for the PWG World Tag Team Championship in a three-way ladder match, which also included Future Shock, losing following interference from referee Rick Knox, whom they had attacked earlier in the match.

==== The Mount Rushmore of Wrestling (2013–2018) ====
On January 12, 2013, The Young Bucks entered the 2013 Dynamite Duumvirate Tag Team Title Tournament, defeating the Inner City Machine Guns (Rich Swann and Ricochet) in their opening match. Later that same event, The Young Bucks defeated the Unbreakable F'N Machines (Brian Cage and Michael Elgin) in their semifinal match to capture the PWG World Tag Team Championship for the third time. They defeated El Generico and Kevin Steen in the final to win the DDT4 tournament for the third time. The Young Bucks made their second successful defense of the PWG World Tag Team Championship on March 23 against the DojoBros (Eddie Edwards and Roderick Strong). On August 9 at PWG's tenth anniversary event, The Young Bucks defeated the DojoBros and the Inner City Machine Guns in a three-way ladder match for their third successful title defense. On August 31, The Young Bucks formed a new heel stable with PWG World Champion Adam Cole and Kevin Steen, with the four dubbing themselves "The Mount Rushmore of Wrestling". On October 19, The Young Bucks defeated Candice LeRae and Joey Ryan to make their fourth successful defense of the PWG World Tag Team Championship. On March 28, 2014, The Young Bucks defeated 2014 DDT4 winners Chuck Taylor and Trent? for their fifth successful title defense. The Young Bucks lost the PWG World Tag Team Championship to LeRae and Ryan in a Guerrilla Warfare match on July 27, 2014.

On June 26, 2015, The Young Bucks defeated Andrew Everett and Trevor Lee to win the PWG World Tag Team Championship for the fourth time, following outside interference from PWG World Champion Roderick Strong. After the match, The Young Bucks, Strong and the returning Super Dragon formed Mount Rushmore 2.0. They made their first successful title defenses against Angélico and Jack Evans on July 24, and Johnny Gargano and Tommaso Ciampa on December 11. At the end of the show, Adam Cole made a surprise return to PWG, joining Mount Rushmore 2.0. On March 18, 2017, The Young Bucks lost the PWG World Tag Team Championship to Penta el Zero M and Rey Fénix in a three-way match, also involving Matt Sydal and Ricochet.

=== Dragon Gate (2008–2009) ===
The Young Bucks made their debut for Dragon Gate (DG) in Tokyo, Japan at the Korakuen Hall on May 14, 2008, in a match where they were defeated by Susumu Yokosuka and Ryo Saito. Their first tour of the company spanned from May 14 to June 14. Their second tour started on August 9, and ended on August 28. On September 5, the Young Bucks took part in Dragon Gate's first show in the United States, held in Los Angeles, California, where they unsuccessfully challenged Saito and Yokosuka for the Open the Twin Gate Championship. Their third tour spanned from April 15 to May 5, 2009. On May 3, in Kanazawa, Ishikawa, Matt and Nick successfully defended their PWG World Tag Team titles against Shingo Takagi and Akira Tozawa, the first time the titles had been defended in Japan. On May 5, 2009, in Aichi, Japan at the Dead or Alive pay-per-view, The Young Bucks and Ryoma teamed up in a losing effort against Tozawa, Kenshin Chikano and Anthony W. Mori.

=== WWE (2008, 2011) ===
On February 22, 2008, Matt appeared as a jobber on World Wrestling Entertainment's (WWE) weekly television show SmackDown, losing to Chuck Palumbo. He appeared in a similar role on the October 17, 2008, episode of SmackDown, this time losing to Big Show in an exhibition Last Man Standing match after going through a table. On the October 28 episode of ECW, the Young Bucks portrayed Triple H and Shawn Michaels in a segment, where they were laid out by John Morrison and The Miz. On August 15, 2011, the Young Bucks had a tryout for the WWE producers prior to the Raw tapings in San Diego.

=== Chikara (2009–2013, 2015) ===
The Young Bucks made their Chikara debuts on March 27, 2009, teaming up with El Generico to form Team PWG in the annual King of Trios tournament. However, the team was eliminated in the first round by The Osirian Portal of Amasis, Ophidian and Escorpion Egipcio. The following night Matt and Nick entered the Rey de Voladores tournament, but were both eliminated in the first round four-way matches. On the third night of the tournament they took part in a tag team gauntlet match, which was won by Mike Quackenbush and Jigsaw. The Young Bucks returned to Chikara on October 17 at An Optimistic View of a Pessimistic World competing in a four-way elimination tag team match, where they were the last team eliminated by the winners The Osirian Portal of Amasis and Ophidian. The following day at Cibernetico Increible Matt and Nick joined opposing eight-man teams in the annual torneo cibernetico match. Matt scored the first elimination of the match, eliminating Green Ant, but the brothers wound up being the fifth and sixth wrestlers eliminated from the match at the hands of Quackenbush and Player Dos.

The Young Bucks returned to Chikara on April 23, 2010, at the 2010 King of Trios, where they teamed up with their brother Malachi as the Jackson 3. They were, however, for the second year in a row, eliminated from the tournament in the first round, this time losing to The Future is Now (Jigsaw, Equinox and Helios). Matt and Nick wrestled the match as heels in Generation Me tights and after the match abandoned Malachi in the ring, when he wanted to shake hands with his opponents. On the third night of the tournament the Bucks were defeated by Quackenbush and Jigsaw in a tag team match. The Young Bucks returned to Chikara on August 27, when Nick entered the Young Lions Cup IX tournament, while Matt defeated Johnny Gargano in a singles match. After Nick was eliminated from the tournament by eventual Young Lions Cup Champion Tadasuke, The Young Bucks teamed up to defeat the Batiri (Kodama and Obariyon) in a tag team match later that same day. On September 18, The Young Bucks defeated Tim Donst and Tursas of the Bruderschaft des Kreuzes in a tag team match. On November 13 at Chikara's first ever internet pay-per-view, High Noon, The Young Bucks, managed by Marty Jannetty, were defeated by The Colony (Fire Ant and Soldier Ant) in a Chikara Campeonatos de Parejas number one contender's match.

The Young Bucks returned to Chikara in late April 2012, first defeating Arik Cannon and Darin Corbin in a regular tag team match on April 28, and then defeating the Batiri (Kobald and Kodama), Bruderschaft des Kreuzes (Jakob Hammermeier and Tim Donst), and the Spectral Envoy (Hallowicked and UltraMantis Black) in a four-way elimination match on April 29 to earn the right to challenge for the Campeonatos de Parejas. On June 2 at Chikarasaurus Rex: How to Hatch a Dinosaur, The Young Bucks defeated F.I.S.T. (Chuck Taylor and Johnny Gargano) in a Two Out of Three Falls match to win the Chikara Campeonatos de Parejas. The Young Bucks made their first successful title defense on July 29, defeating The Throwbacks (Dasher Hatfield and Mark Angelosetti). On September 14, The Young Bucks entered the 2012 King of Trios, teaming with Mike Bennett as Team Ring of Honor and defeating the Faces of Pain (The Barbarian, Meng and The Warlord) in their first round match. The following day, Team ROH advanced to the semifinals with a win over The Extreme Trio (Jerry Lynn, Tommy Dreamer and Too Cold Scorpio). Team ROH opened the third and final day of the tournament by defeating the all-female Team Sendai Girls (Dash Chisako, Meiko Satomura and Sendai Sachiko) in the semifinals. In the final of the tournament, Team ROH was defeated by the Spectral Envoy (Frightmare, Hallowicked and UltraMantis Black).

On November 10, The Young Bucks made their second successful defense of the Campeonatos de Parejas against the Spectral Envoy (Hallowicked and UltraMantis Black). The Young Bucks' third successful defense took place at the Under the Hood internet pay-per-view on December 2, where they defeated 1–2–3 Kid and Marty Jannetty. On February 10, 2013, The Young Bucks lost the Campeonatos de Parejas to 3.0 (Scott Parker and Shane Matthews), ending their reign at 253 days and three successful defenses. On May 18, The Young Bucks returned to Chikara to take part in the 2013 Tag World Grand Prix. After wins over The Baltic Siege (Estonian ThunderFrog and Latvian Proud Oak), The Spectral Envoy (Frightmare and Hallowicked) and The Batiri (Kodama and Obariyon), The Young Bucks were defeated in the final of the tournament by Pieces of Hate (Jigsaw and The Shard).

The Young Bucks returned to Chikara in September 2015, when they teamed with A.J. Styles in the 2015 King of Trios, making it to the final, before losing to Aero Star, Drago and Fénix.

=== Ring of Honor (2009–2018, 2022) ===
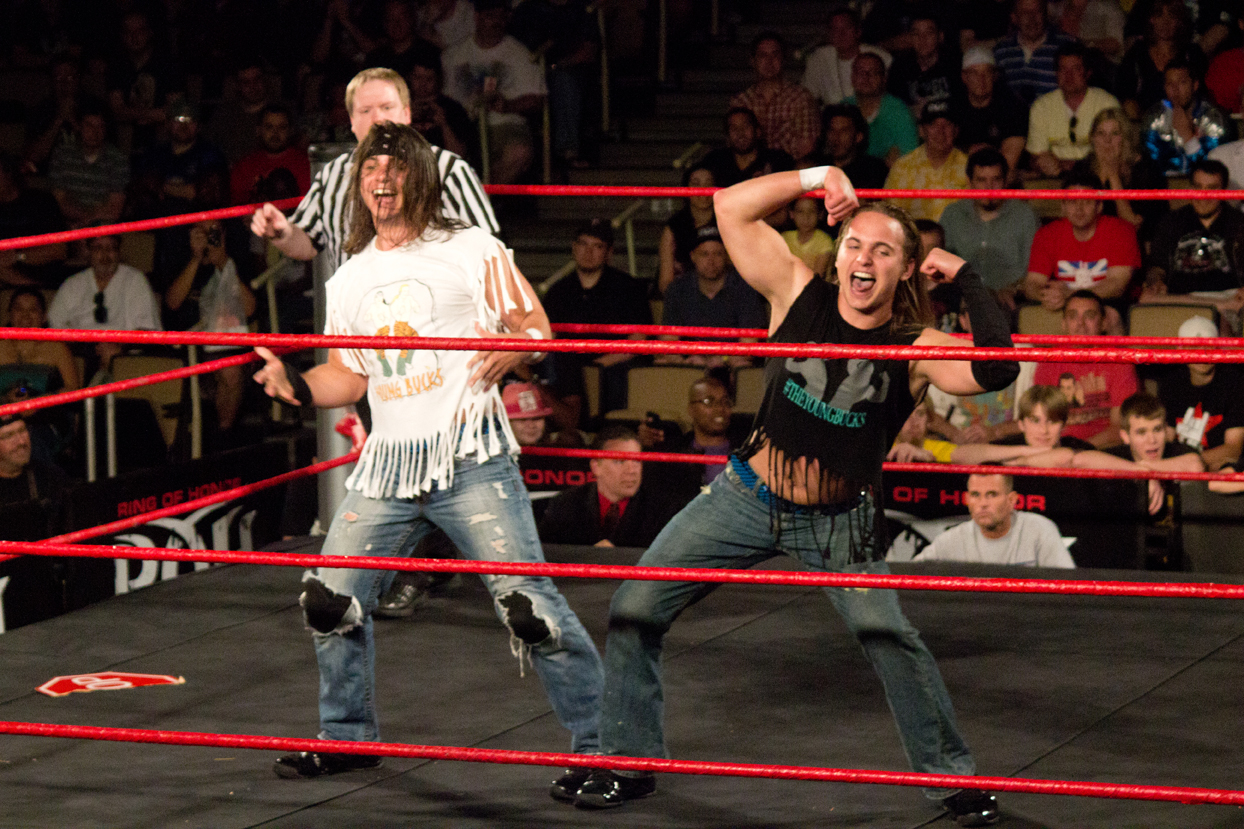
The Young Bucks posing before their match at Showdown in the Sun

Matt and Nick made their Ring of Honor (ROH) debut on May 29 and 30, 2009, defeating the teams of Sal Rinauro and Brandon Day and Silas Young and Bobby Fish, respectively, in matches taped for the June 27 and July 18 episodes of Ring of Honor Wrestling on HDNet. On September 26, 2009, at Glory by Honor VIII: The Final Countdown, they defeated the, at the time, five-time ROH World Tag Team Champions the Briscoe Brothers. On December 19 at Final Battle, ROH's first live pay-per-view, the Young Bucks picked up another big win, this time over former ROH World Tag Team Champions Kevin Steen and El Generico. After signing contracts with Total Nonstop Action Wrestling, The Young Bucks wrestled their last HDNet tapings in January 2010, defeating the American Wolves (Davey Richards and Eddie Edwards) on the 8th and losing to the Briscoes in an ROH World Tag Team Title match on the 9th. On January 29, the Young Bucks wrestled their ROH farewell match, an eight-man tag team match, where they teamed up with the Briscoe Brothers in a losing effort against the American Wolves and the Kings of Wrestling (Chris Hero and Claudio Castagnoli).

On July 23, Matt and Nick returned using their Generation Me name and were defeated by the American Wolves. The following day they were defeated by the ROH World Tag Team Champions, Kings of Wrestling, in a non–title match. After the Young Bucks were granted a release from TNA, ROH announced on August 24, 2011, that they would return to the promotion on September 17 at Death Before Dishonor IX. At the pay-per-view The Young Bucks defeated Future Shock (Adam Cole and Kyle O'Reilly) and the Bravado Brothers in a three-way elimination match. On December 23 at Final Battle, The Young Bucks won a four team gauntlet match to earn a shot at the ROH World Tag Team Championship. At the 10th Anniversary Show on March 4, The Young Bucks were unsuccessful in their title challenge. The Young Bucks left ROH later in the year, last competing at a Ring of Honor Wrestling television taping on August 3, where they lost to Caprice Coleman and Cedric Alexander in the opening round of a tournament to crown new ROH World Tag Team Champions.

The Young Bucks returned at All-Star Extravaganza V on August 3, where they were defeated by Adrenaline Rush (ACH and TaDarius Thomas) in their return match; a three-way match, which also included C&C Wrestle Factory (Caprice Coleman and Cedric Alexander). On August 17 at Manhattan Mayhem V, The Young Bucks were defeated by the Forever Hooligans (Alex Koslov and Rocky Romero) in what was billed as a dream tag team match. On March 8, 2014, the Young Bucks defeated reDRagon (Bobby Fish and Kyle O'Reilly) to win the ROH World Tag Team Championship for the first time. They lost the title back to reDRagon on May 17 at War of the Worlds. The Young Bucks received a rematch for the title on September 6 at All Star Extravaganza 6, but were again defeated by reDRagon. Another rematch on March 1, 2015, at the 13th Anniversary Show ended with another win for reDRagon. On September 30, 2016, The Young Bucks defeated The Addiction (Christopher Daniels and Frankie Kazarian) and the Motor City Machine Guns (Alex Shelley and Chris Sabin) in a three-way Ladder War VI at All Star Extravaganza VIII to win the ROH World Tag Team Championship for the second time.

On December 3, it was reported that The Young Bucks had signed a new two-year contract, which covers both ROH and New Japan Pro-Wrestling (NJPW). On March 4, 2017, The Young Bucks lost the ROH World Tag Team Championship to The Hardys (Broken Matt and Brother Nero). On April 1 at Supercard of Honor XI, The Young Bucks regained the ROH World Tag Team Championship from The Hardys in a ladder match. On August 20, The Young Bucks became double champions, when they teamed with their Bullet Club stablemate Adam Page to form a trio named "The Hung Bucks" and defeated Dalton Castle and The Boys for the ROH World Six-Man Tag Team Championship. On September 22 at Death Before Dishonor XV, The Young Bucks lost the ROH World Tag Team Championship to the Motor City Machine Guns. At Final Battle, they lost to the Briscoes and SCU in a Ladder war match. The next day, the Bucks left ROH.

According to them, they would never leave ROH if the new contract would give them more money, but the offer they got was under their expectations.

On April 1, 2022, the Young Bucks would return to ROH, now owned by AEW President Tony Khan, at Supercard of Honor XV, attacking the Briscoe Brothers (Jay and Mark Briscoe).

=== Dragon Gate USA (2009–2010, 2012, 2013) ===
On July 25, 2009, the Young Bucks appeared on Dragon Gate USA's (DGUSA) first pay-per-view Enter the Dragon, where they defeated the Warriors-5 of Cima and Susumu Yokosuka. On September 6 at the second PPV titled Untouchable, they were defeated in the main event by Real Hazard (Ryo Saito and Genki Horiguchi). On November 28 at Freedom Fight, the Young Bucks wrestled in the same 6-way Open the Freedom Gate Championship tournament match, which was won by Gran Akuma. After signing contracts with TNA Wrestling, the Young Bucks made their fourth appearance for DGUSA on January 23, 2010, at Fearless, where they competed in a three-way elimination tag team match, which was won by the Muscle Outlaw'z (Naruki Doi and Masato Yoshino). They were advertised to take part in the March 26 and 27 shows in Phoenix, Arizona, but TNA made the decision to pull them from the events. However, in February, TNA and Dragon Gate USA came to an agreement and the Young Bucks were allowed to make their farewell appearances. In March, the Young Bucks made their final appearances for the company, losing to Cima, Gamma and Dragon Kid at Open the Ultimate Gate on the 26 in a six-man tag team match, where they teamed with Jack Evans and losing to Mike Quackenbush and Jigsaw in a tag team match at the tapings of Mercury Rising on the 27.

The Young Bucks returned to the promotion on January 27, 2012, defeating Chuck Taylor and Scorpio Sky in a tag team match. The Young Bucks returned to DGUSA on January 25, 2013, defeating D.U.F. (Arik Cannon and Sami Callihan) in a tag team match. At the following day's iPPV, The Young Bucks picked up another win over the Jimmyz (Jimmy Susumu and Ryo "Jimmy" Saito), before going on to lose against the team of Akira Tozawa and AR Fox during another iPPV on January 27. On April 6 at Open the Ultimate Gate 2013, The Young Bucks defeated Fox and Cima to become the new Open the United Gate Champions. They made their first successful title defense on June 2 at an event promoted by DGUSA's close affiliate, Evolve, defeating Eita and Tomahawk T.T. Their second successful defense took place on July 28 at Enter the Dragon 2013, Dragon Gate USA's fourth anniversary event, where they defeated Rich Swann and Ricochet. They lost the title to the Bravado Brothers on November 16.

=== Total Nonstop Action Wrestling (2009–2011, 2013, 2021) ===
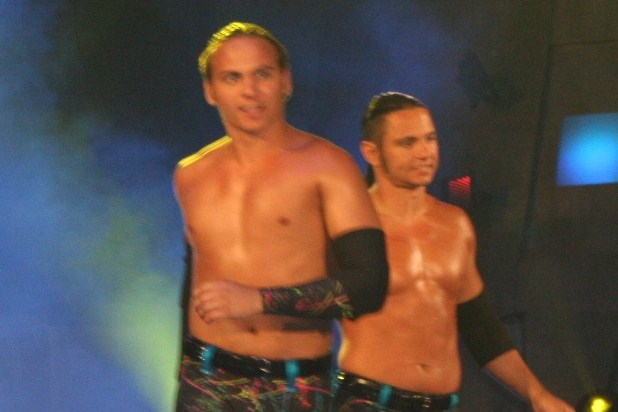
Generation Me in TNA in July 2010

On December 21, 2009, the Young Bucks reached one of their personal goals as they took part in Total Nonstop Action Wrestling's (TNA) Impact! tapings, wrestling the Motor City Machine Guns (Alex Shelley and Chris Sabin) in a tryout dark match, which earned them the praise of TNA management. On December 26, 2009, TNA president Dixie Carter announced on her Twitter account that TNA had signed the Young Bucks to a contract. The contracts signed were one year long. According to Eric Bischoff, TNA executive Bob Ryder was responsible for getting The Young Bucks their break in TNA.

The team, renamed Generation Me, based on the Me generation of the 1970s (even though the brothers were born in the 1980s), made their debut on the January 14, 2010, episode of Impact!, in which the brothers, renamed Max and Jeremy, defeated the Motor City Machine Guns. On the February 18 episode of Impact!, Jeremy and Max were given the last name Buck. At Destination X, Generation Me wrestled for the number one contendership to the TNA World Tag Team Championship in an Ultimate X match, but were defeated by the Motor City Machine Guns. Max and Jeremy spent the next months mainly wrestling singles matches. On the July 8 episode of Impact!, Jeremy picked up a major singles victory, defeating X Division Champion Douglas Williams in a non-title ladder match.

Generation Me returned to pay-per-view on September 5 at No Surrender, where they replaced London Brawling (Desmond Wolfe and Magnus) and unsuccessfully challenged the Motor City Machine Guns for the TNA World Tag Team Championship. After the match, Generation Me turned heel by attacking the champions and giving Shelley a storyline injury with a double rope-hung DDT. On the following episode of Impact!, Max and Jeremy laid claim to the TNA World Tag Team Championship, claiming that the champions would not be able to defend them for 30 days, due to Shelley's injury, before stealing Sabin's title belt. Shelley, however, made his return two weeks later and promised Generation Me a rematch for the World Tag Team Championship at Bound for Glory. At the pay-per-view, the Motor City Machine Guns defeated Generation Me to retain the TNA World Tag Team Championship. The following month, Generation Me received a new fan in Tara. After Jeremy pinned Sabin in an eight-person tag team match, where Generation Me teamed with Robbie E and Cookie and the Motor City Machine Guns with Jay Lethal and Velvet Sky, on the November 18 episode of Impact!, the Motor City Machine Guns challenged Generation Me to an Empty Arena match. The match took place later that same night on Reaction, with the Motor City Machine Guns coming out victorious. On December 5 at Final Resolution, Generation Me challenged the Motor City Machine Guns for the World Tag Team Championship in a Full Metal Mayhem match, but were once again unsuccessful. The following month, they signed new two–year contracts with the company.

On the January 27 episode of Impact!, TNA started a tournament to determine a new number one contender for X Division Champion Kazarian. In the first match of the tournament, Max defeated Sabin and Amazing Red in a three-way match to advance to the final at Against All Odds. The following week, Jeremy defeated Douglas Williams and Jay Lethal in another three-way match to also advance to the final. However, both Max and Jeremy were forced to miss the final of the tournament at Against All Odds, after failing to get to Florida due to travel issues. The following month at Victory Road, both Max and Jeremy received their shot at the X Division Championship, held by Kazarian, in an Ultimate X match, which also included Robbie E. Prior to the match, the brothers teased dissension, with Max claiming that their goal was to make him the X Division Champion. At the end of the match, Jeremy and Max finally started fighting between themselves, but in the end both of them failed in their attempt to win the X Division Championship, as Kazarian emerged victorious to successfully retain the title. At the March 15 tapings of Xplosion, the Bucks faced each other in a singles match for the first time in TNA, with Max picking up the win. Max and Jeremy faced each other in a rematch on the March 31 episode of Impact!, where Max was once again victorious.

On the April 7 episode of Impact!, Generation Me teamed with Robbie E in a six-man tag team match, where they faced Sabin, Brian Kendrick and Suicide. At the end of the match, Max, thinking Jeremy was trying to steal the spotlight from him, turned on his brother, crotching him at the top rope, before dropping him to the mat with a rope-hung DDT. After Kendrick had pinned Jeremy for the win, Max removed his Generation Me armband and threw it at his brother. On April 17 at Lockdown, Max defeated seven other men, including Jeremy, in an Xscape match to become the number one contender to Kazarian's X Division Championship. On the May 5 episode of Impact!, Generation Me, seemingly once again on the same page as faces, came together with Amazing Red and Brian Kendrick to fight for X Division's future, after the legitimate firing of Jay Lethal. On May 15 at Sacrifice, Max failed in his attempt to win the X Division Championship from Kazarian. At the all X Division pay-per-view Destination X on July 10, Generation Me was defeated by the team of Eric Young and Shark Boy. This was their last match in TNA, as the following day, Matt announced that he and his brother had requested their release from their contracts with the promotion. Matt and Nick later revealed that the request stemmed from monetary issues, while also venting their frustrations with TNA's booking, noting the storyline with Tara, which went nowhere, and the quickly aborted feud between the brothers. Matt has also stated that after leaving TNA, he was ready to quit professional wrestling altogether, before he and his brother decided to instead reinvent themselves and their act.

On March 18, 2013, Generation Me returned to TNA to take part in the tapings of the Tag Team Tournament One Night Only pay-per-view. After defeating Petey Williams and Sonjay Dutt in the first round, they were eliminated from the tournament in the second round by Team 3D (Bully Ray and Devon). At the tapings of the following day's Hardcore Justice 2 pay-per-view, Generation Me was defeated in a ladder match by Bad Influence (Christopher Daniels and Kazarian).

At the renamed Impact Wrestling's Against All Odds event on June 12, 2021, The Young Bucks made a one-off appearance for the promotion as part of the working relationship between Impact and All Elite Wrestling. During the main event, an Impact World Championship title defense by Elite stablemate Kenny Omega against Moose that took place at AEW's "home field" of Daily's Place in Jacksonville, Florida, the Bucks interfered on Omega's behalf, leading to his victory in the match.

=== New Japan Pro-Wrestling (2013–2019) ===
==== Debut and joining Bullet Club (2013–2016) ====
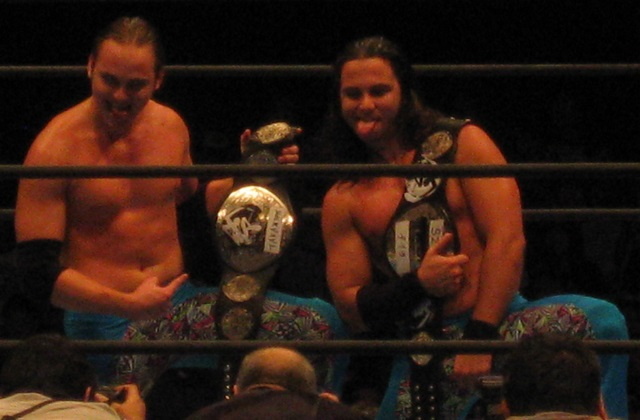
The Young Bucks after winning the IWGP Junior Heavyweight Tag Team Championship on November 9, 2013

On October 15, 2013, NJPW announced that The Young Bucks would be making their debuts for the promotion in the Super Jr. Tag Tournament, which started October 25. They got the booking through Kazuchika Okada, whom they had befriended during his stay in TNA. In their debut, The Young Bucks represented the heel foreigner stable Bullet Club. In their debut match for the promotion, The Young Bucks defeated fellow Americans Beretta and Brian Kendrick, thanks to a pre-match assault by the rest of Bullet Club, to advance to the semifinals of the Super Jr. Tag Tournament. During the next two weeks, New Japan held seven smaller shows, with The Young Bucks main eventing every one of them, teaming with Bullet Club stablemate Karl Anderson in six-man tag team matches against the IWGP Heavyweight Champion Kazuchika Okada and members of his Chaos stable. The Young Bucks suffered their first loss in the promotion on October 30, when they and Anderson were defeated by Gedo, Jado and Okada, who pinned Nick for the win. On November 6, The Young Bucks first defeated Gedo and Jado in the semifinals and then another Chaos team, the Forever Hooligans, in the final to win the 2013 Super Jr. Tag Tournament.

As a result of their win, The Young Bucks received a shot at the IWGP Junior Heavyweight Tag Team Championship and on November 9 at Power Struggle, defeated Suzuki-gun (Taichi and Taka Michinoku) to become the new champions. The Young Bucks returned to New Japan on January 4, 2014, at Wrestle Kingdom 8, where they made their first successful title defense in a four-way match against the Forever Hooligans, Suzuki-gun and Time Splitters (Alex Shelley and Kushida). The Young Bucks made their second successful title defense on February 11 at The New Beginning in Osaka against the Time Splitters. Towards the end of the match, Matt legitimately broke his hand. Later that same event, Nick confronted and challenged IWGP Junior Heavyweight Champion Kota Ibushi. Nick received his title shot on April 3, but was defeated by Ibushi. Three days later at Invasion Attack, The Young Bucks successfully defended the IWGP Junior Heavyweight Tag Team Championship against Ibushi and El Desperado. On May 3 at Wrestling Dontaku, The Young Bucks made their fourth successful title defense against the Forever Hooligans. The Young Bucks made their fifth successful defense on May 10 during the NJPW and ROH co-produced Global Wars event in Toronto, defeating Forever Hooligans and Time Splitters in a three-way match. From May 30 to June 6, The Young Bucks took part in the Best of the Super Juniors, where they wrestled in separate blocks. They both finished with a record of four wins and three losses, narrowly missing advancement to the semifinals. As a result of losing to Shelley and Kushida during the tournament, The Young Bucks and Time Splitters faced off in another IWGP Junior Heavyweight Tag Team Championship match on June 21 at Dominion 6.21, where The Young Bucks' seven-month reign came to an end.

The Young Bucks received a rematch for the title on October 13 at King of Pro-Wrestling in a three-way match also involving Forever Hooligans, but were again defeated by Time Splitters. In November, The Young Bucks made it to the final of the Super Jr. Tag Tournament, where they were defeated by reDRagon. On January 4, 2015, at Wrestle Kingdom 9, The Young Bucks unsuccessfully challenged reDRagon for the IWGP Junior Heavyweight Tag Team Championship in a four-way match also involving Forever Hooligans and Time Splitters. On February 11 at The New Beginning in Osaka, The Young Bucks defeated reDRagon and Time Splitters in a three-way match to win the IWGP Junior Heavyweight Tag Team Championship for the second time. On April 5 at Invasion Attack, The Young Bucks lost the IWGP Junior Heavyweight Tag Team Championship to Roppongi Vice (Beretta and Rocky Romero) in their first title defense. The Young Bucks regained the title from Roppongi Vice on May 3 at Wrestling Dontaku in a three-way match, also involving reDRagon. They made their first successful title defense in a three-way rematch on July 5 at Dominion 7.5 in Osaka-jo Hall. They lost the title to reDRagon in their second defense on August 16. The Young Bucks won the title for the record-tying fourth time in a four-way match on January 4, 2016, at Wrestle Kingdom 10. Their reign ended in their first defense on February 11 at The New Beginning in Osaka, where they were defeated by Matt Sydal and Ricochet in a three-way match, also involving reDRagon.

==== The Elite (2016–2019) ====
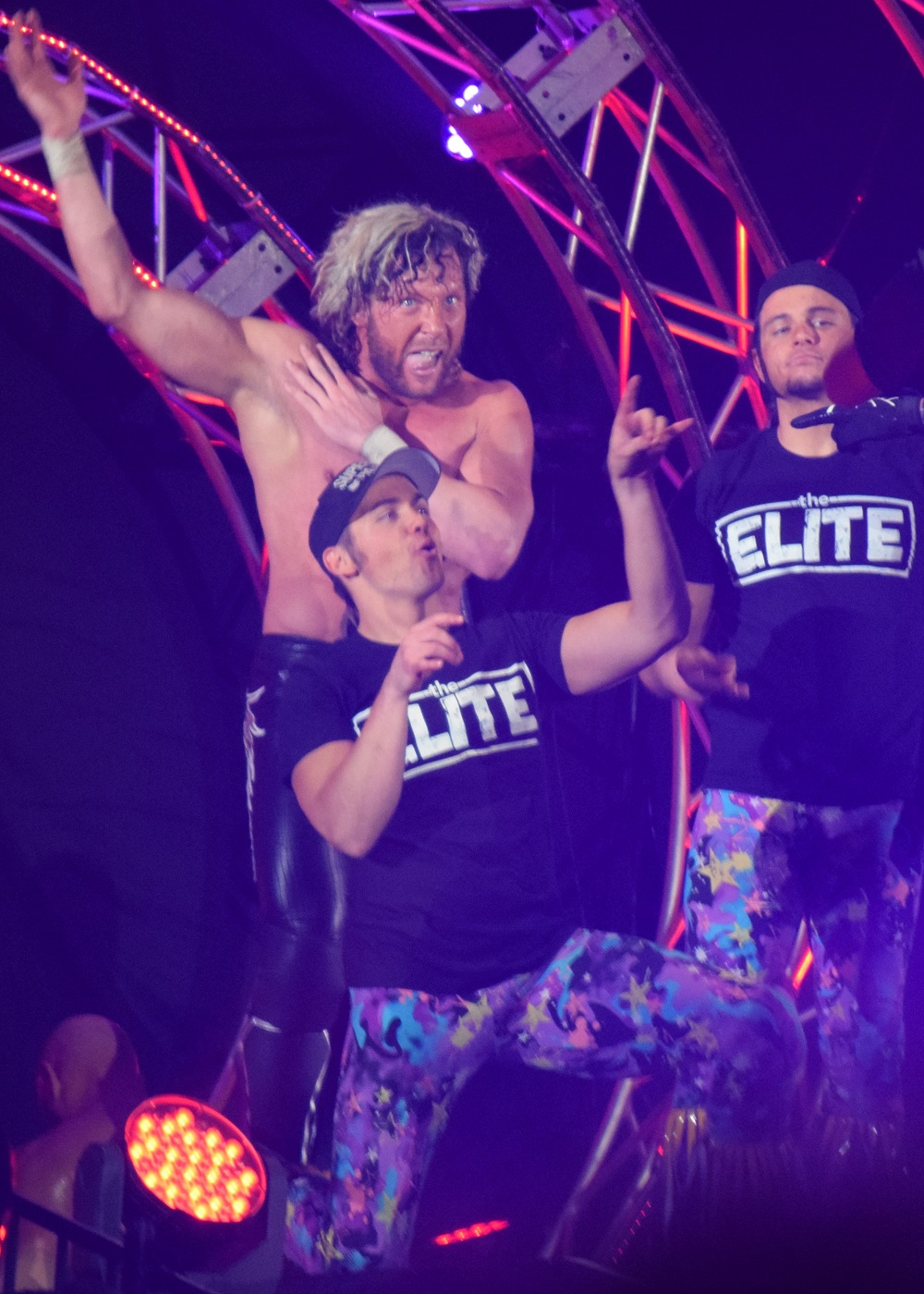
The Young Bucks with Kenny Omega as The Elite in February 2016

In early 2016, The Young Bucks formed Bullet Club subgroup The Elite with Kenny Omega, after helping him kick A.J. Styles out of the stable. On February 20 at Honor Rising: Japan 2016, The Elite defeated Jay Briscoe, Mark Briscoe and Toru Yano to win the NEVER Openweight 6-Man Tag Team Championship. They lost the title to Hiroshi Tanahashi, Michael Elgin and Yoshitatsu on April 10 at Invasion Attack, before regaining it on May 3 at Wrestling Dontaku. On June 19 at Dominion 6.19 in Osaka-jo Hall, The Young Bucks won the IWGP Junior Heavyweight Tag Team Championship for the fifth time by defeating Matt Sydal and Ricochet, reDRagon and Roppongi Vice in a four-way elimination match. On July 3, The Young Bucks and Omega lost the NEVER Openweight 6-Man Tag Team Championship to Matt Sydal, Ricochet and Satoshi Kojima.

On August 21, The Young Bucks made their first successful defense of the IWGP Junior Heavyweight Tag Team Championship against the reunited Motor City Machine Guns. After their win, The Young Bucks made a challenge for NJPW's "heavyweight" tag team title, which led to a match on September 22 at Destruction in Hiroshima, where they unsuccessfully challenged reigning IWGP Tag Team Champions the Briscoe Brothers. Three days later at Destruction in Kobe, The Young Bucks and Adam Cole were defeated by David Finlay, Ricochet and Satoshi Kojima in a match for the vacant NEVER Openweight 6-Man Tag Team Championship. This led to a match on October 10 at King of Pro-Wrestling, where The Young Bucks successfully defended the IWGP Junior Heavyweight Tag Team Championship against Finlay and Ricochet. On January 4, 2017, at Wrestle Kingdom 11, The Young Bucks lost the IWGP Junior Heavyweight Tag Team Championship to Roppongi Vice. The Young Bucks regained the title from Roppongi Vice on June 11 at Dominion 6.11 in Osaka-jo Hall. They lost the title to Funky Future (Ricochet and Ryusuke Taguchi) on August 13. On January 4, 2018, The Young Bucks defeated Roppongi 3K (Sho and Yoh) at Wrestle Kingdom 12 to win the IWGP Junior Heavyweight Tag Team Championship for the seventh time. Their reign lasted just 24 days before losing the titles back to Roppongi 3K at the New Beginning in Sapporo.

On February 24, The Young Bucks announced that they would move up to New Japan's heavyweight tag team division. At Strong Style Evolved, they lost against the Golden☆Lovers. At Sakura Genesis, they scored their first victory in the Heavyweight tag team division against their Bullet Club stablemates Chase Owens and Yujiro Takahashi. At Wrestling Dontaku, they won the NEVER Openweight 6-Man Tag Team Championship for the third time, this time with Marty Scurll under the team name Super Villains. At Dominion, they defeated Los Ingobernables de Japón (Evil and Sanada) to win the IWGP Tag Team Championship for the first time, becoming the second tag team to win the IWGP Jr. and Heavyweight Tag Team titles, and the first duo to have won all three of NJPW's team championships (IWGP Tag Team, IWGP Jr. Tag Team, and NEVER Openweight 6-Man Tag Team) together. On August 12 during the G1 Climax 28, the Super Villains lost their NEVER Openweight 6-Man Tag Team Championship to Tama Tonga, Tanga Loa and Taiji Ishimori, all a part of the rebellious Bullet Club sub-faction Bullet Club OG. At Fighting Spirit Unleashed, they lost the IGWP Heavyweight Tag Team Championship to Guerrillas of Destiny (Tama Tonga and Tanga Loa). At Wrestle Kingdom 13, The Young Bucks participated in a three-way match for the IWGP Tag Team Championship against then-champions Guerrillas of Destiny and Los Ingobernables de Japón, but lost the match. On February 7, 2019, their profiles were removed from NJPW website.

=== All In (2017–2018) ===
In May 2017, wrestling journalist Dave Meltzer suggested that an independent wrestling show would be unable to sell out a ten thousand seat arena in the United States. The Young Bucks, along with Cody Rhodes, challenged the idea by planning a show specifically for the purposes of drawing ten thousand fans. In May 2018, it was announced that the show would be named "All In", and would be held on September 1, 2018, at the Sears Centre Arena, including many popular wrestlers from various promotions such as Ring of Honor, New Japan Pro-Wrestling and the independent circuit. When All In was announced on May 13, tickets sold out in 30 minutes. At the event, The Young Bucks along with Kota Ibushi defeated Bandido, Rey Fénix, and Rey Mysterio in the main event.

=== All Elite Wrestling (2019–present) ===
==== Founding of All Elite Wrestling and early feuds (2019–2020) ====
On November 5, 2018, several trademarks were filed in Jacksonville, Florida that indicated the launch of All Elite Wrestling (AEW). In December 2018, Cody, The Young Bucks and several other wrestlers left ROH. The official announcement of AEW's creation came at midnight Pacific Time on January 1, 2019, in an episode of Being the Elite, a YouTube web series created by and featuring The Elite. Also announced in the episode was "Double or Nothing", AEW's inaugural event and sequel to "All In". On January 2, 2019, Cody and The Young Bucks officially signed five-year contracts with the promotion, serving as AEW's executive vice presidents, while entrepreneur, football executive and longtime wrestling fan Tony Khan was announced as the president of the company. On January 8, 2019, the company held its inaugural press conference on the forecourt of the TIAA Bank Field, where they announced talents that were going to perform as part of the promotion including Joey Janela, Christopher Daniels, Scorpio Sky, Pac, Frankie Kazarian and Chris Jericho. They also announced a working relationship with Chinese professional wrestling promotion Oriental Wrestling Entertainment (OWE), an organization founded by Cima.

On March 16, 2019, the Bucks made their debut at the Mexican promotion Lucha Libre AAA Worldwide (AAA) as part of partnership with All Elite Wrestling at the Rey de Reyes event where they challenged the newly crowned AAA World Tag Team Champions the Lucha Brothers (Pentagón Jr. and Fénix) who defeated Los Mercenarios (El Texano Jr. and Rey Escorpión). Later that same night, the Bucks defeated the Lucha Brothers to win their titles, this being their first championship in Mexico. They lost the titles back to the Lucha Brothers at Verano de Escándalo in June.

At AEW's inaugural event, Double or Nothing, on May 25, The Young Bucks defeated the Lucha Brothers. The following month at the Fyter Fest event, The Young Bucks teamed with Kenny Omega to defeat the Lucha Brothers and Laredo Kid in a six-man tag team match. They then followed this with a win over Cody and Dustin Rhodes at Fight for the Fallen on July 13. At All Out on August 31, The Young Bucks lost in a rematch for the AAA World Tag Team Championship to the Lucha Brothers in a ladder match, ending their feud.

On the premiere episode of Dynamite on October 2, The Young Bucks teamed with Omega in a losing effort to Chris Jericho, Santana and Ortiz. After the match, The Young Bucks, Omega and Cody were beaten down by Jericho, Santana, Ortiz, Sammy Guevara and the debuting Jake Hager, marking the debut of The Inner Circle faction to rival The Elite. The team then entered into a tournament to crown the inaugural AEW World Tag Team Champions, but were eliminated by Private Party (Isiah Kassidy and Marq Quen) in the first round. The Young Bucks subsequently resumed their feud with The Inner Circle, leading to a match between The Young Bucks and Santana and Ortiz being arranged for Full Gear on November 9, which Santana and Ortiz won. The feud between the two teams concluded on the December 11 episode of Dynamite, when The Young Bucks defeated Santana and Ortiz in a street fight tag team match.

At Bash at the Beach on January 15, 2020, The Young Bucks competed in a four-way tag team match to determine the number one contenders for the AEW World Tag Team Championship, but the match was won by Omega and Adam Page. On the February 19 episode of Dynamite, The Young Bucks won a tag team battle royal for the right to face Page and Omega for the championship at the Revolution pay-per-view on February 29, but failed to win after Page pinned Matt Jackson. On the March 11 episode of Dynamite, Nick Jackson was given a kayfabe injury by the hands of the Inner Circle; in reality, he had taken paternity leave for the birth of his third child. Shortly after Double or Nothing, they returned and on an episode of Dynamite, where they challenged FTR (Cash Wheeler and Dax Harwood) for a shot at the AEW Tag Team Championship, Hangman Page interfering and costing them the title shot, kicking him out of the Elite. At All Out, they faced The Jurassic Express and won, expressing a new attitude. On the September 9 episode of Dynamite, they superkicked Alex Marvez, turning tweener in the process.

==== Championship reigns (2020–2023) ====
On November 7, 2020, at Full Gear, The Young Bucks defeated FTR to win their first AEW Tag Team Championship. Had they lost this match, they would've been banned from wrestling for future AEW Tag Team Championships. They won the titles after Matt Jackson avoided a springboard 450° splash by Cash Wheeler and hit a superkick for the pinfall win. On the December 25 episode of Dynamite, they successfully defended the AEW Tag Team Championships against The Acclaimed (Anthony Bowens and Max Caster).

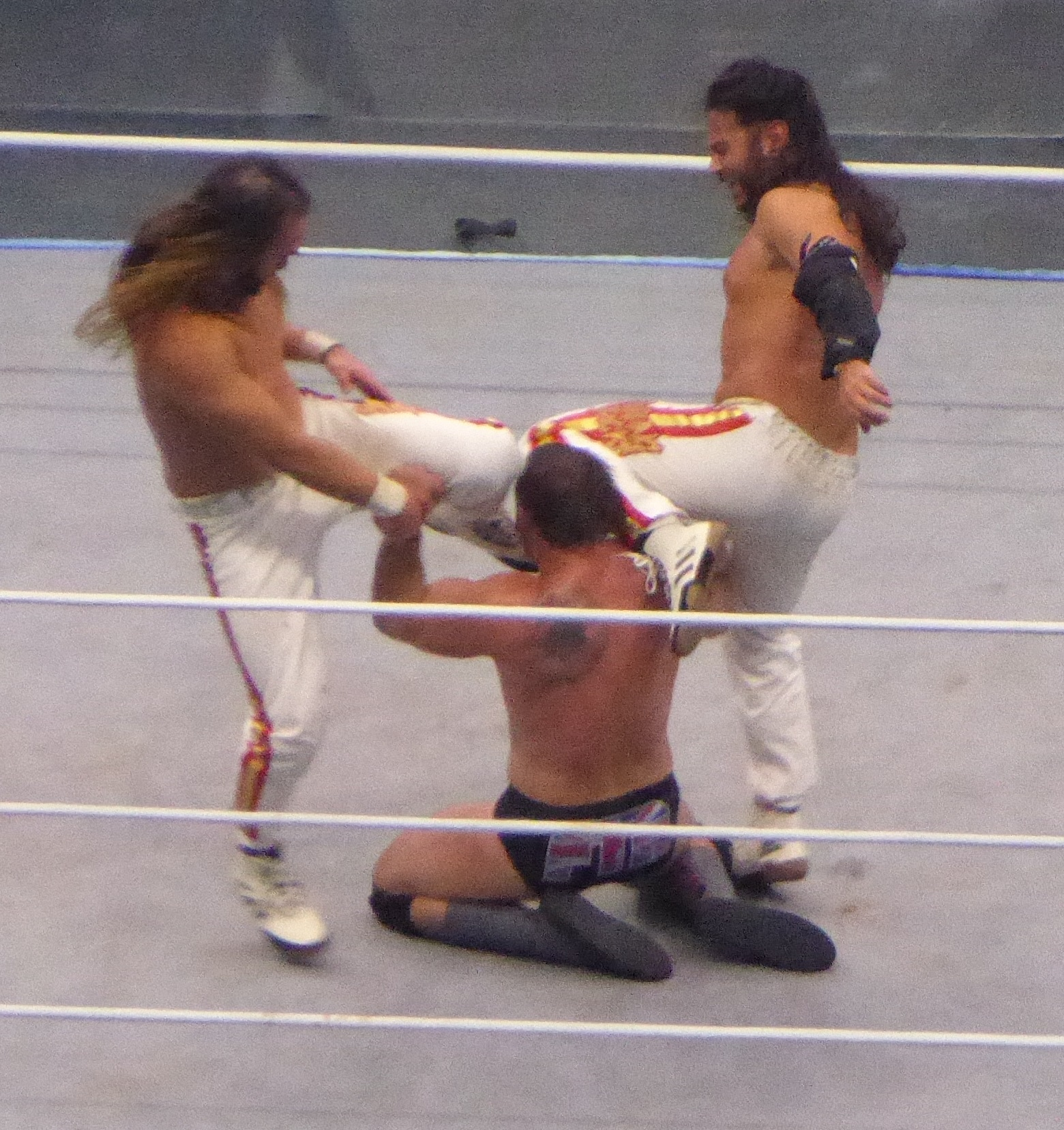
The Young Bucks delivering the BTE Trigger to Cash Wheeler at All In in August 2023

Two weeks later, on night 1 of the New Year's Smash episode of Dynamite, The Young Bucks joined AEW World Champion Kenny Omega and Impact World Tag Team Champions the Good Brothers (Karl Anderson and Doc Gallows) in throwing the Too-Sweet sign, suggesting a reunion between the five. However, on January 20, they refused to be bought by Don Callis while still being Omega's friends, thus making The Young Bucks become tweeners in the process. This would only last about two months though, as after weeks of verbal insults from Callis, The Young Bucks would be forced to choose whether to join Omega and the Good Brothers or not. At first, it appeared as though The Young Bucks would choose not to align with Omega, however on the April 7 episode of Dynamite, The Young Bucks would ultimately choose to join Omega, turning them heels in the process for the first time in their time at AEW. They would further cement their heel turn in the days that followed on social media, and the April 14 episode of Dynamite, where they displayed many heelish tactics during their match again Death Triangle (Pac and Rey Fénix) including removing the luchador mask off of Fénix. Ultimately, it would be the Lucha Bros who would end the Bucks' championship reign at 302 days, defeating them via pinfall in a steel cage match at All Out on September 5 of that year. The Young Bucks would regain the AEW Tag Team Championship in a ladder match against Jurassic Express on the June 15, 2022, special edition of Road Rager, making them the first two-time champions. They lost the championships to Swerve in our Glory (Keith Lee and Swerve Strickland) in a match also involving Team Taz's Ricky Starks and Powerhouse Hobbs, ending their second reign at 28 days.

On the August 3, 2022 episode of Dynamite, Adam Cole and reDRagon turned on the Young Bucks, but they were saved by Adam Page and turned faces in the process. The following week in a backstage segment, The Young Bucks thanked Page for saving them and asked him if he would be their partner in the upcoming AEW World Trios Championship Tournament, however Page politely refused due to his alliance with The Dark Order, who were also competing in the tournament. During the week leading up to the next Dynamite, in which the Bucks had their first trios tournament match, the Bucks claimed they had found a partner and teased who it was on their Twitter account. On the August 17 episode of Dynamite, the mystery partner was revealed to be the returning Omega, reforming the original Elite trio and the group went on to defeat La Facción Ingobernable's Andrade El Idolo, Rush and Dragon Lee, to advance to the semi-final round, and the United Empire to advance to the final round. At All Out, The Elite defeated Page and the Dark Order to become the inaugural AEW World Trios Champions.

After the post-All Out media scrum, the Bucks and Omega confronted AEW World Champion CM Punk backstage in retaliation to Punk's harsh statements about them as EVPs. Multiple publications such as Fightful, PWInsider, and Wrestling Observer Newsletter reported that after Punk's comments, a shoot backstage fight occurred between the Bucks, Omega, Punk, and AEW coach Ace Steel (Punk's longtime friend and trainer). On the September 7 episode of Dynamite, Khan announced that the trios titles had been vacated.

The Young Bucks and Omega returned on November 19, at Full Gear, challenging Death Triangle, for the AEW World Trios Championship, in a losing effort. This match was announced to be the first in a Best of Seven series, between the two teams. The series concluded in an Escalera De La Muerte Ladder Match, on the January 11 episode of Dynamite, where The Elite was victorious, winning the Best of Seven series 4-3 and in-turn regaining the World Trios Championships. The Elite made successful defenses against The Firm and AR Fox and Top Flight (Dante and Darius Martin). On March 5, at Revolution, The Elite lost the AEW World Trios Championships to the House of Black, ending their second reign at 53 days. The Elite attempted to regain the championships 10 days later on Dynamite, in a Three-way trios match against House of Black and the Jericho Appreciation Society, but failed, when House of Black retained the championships. In the aftermath of the match, the Blackpool Combat Club and Page brawled towards ringside, causing the Elite to stand alongside their former stablemate Page, although as the Blackpool Combat Club fled, Omega refused to further embrace Page. On the May 17 edition of Dynamite, The Young Bucks and Page came to the aid of Omega, attacking the BCC. In the ring, Page claimed that he, Omega, and The Young Bucks, were The Elite, leading to him re-joining the stable after a near 3-year absence. Page also challenged the BCC to an Anarchy in the Arena match at Double or Nothing, which was soon after made official for the event. At the event, The Elite lost after Konosuke Takeshita, who had aligned himself with The Elite in recent weeks, attacked Omega, turning heel and ending his brief association with the stable. Page and the Young Bucks would then compete in a ten-man tag team match alongside Eddie Kingston and Tomohiro Ishii against Takeshita, the BCC and Shota Umino at Forbidden Door, which they won. At Blood & Guts, The Elite, now including Kota Ibushi, defeated the BCC, Takeshita, and Pac in a Blood and Guts match. On August 27 at All In, The Young Bucks unsuccessfully challenged FTR for the AEW World Tag Team Championships. On September 22 at the Rampage edition of Grand Slam, The Young Bucks and Page won the ROH World Six-Man Tag Team Championship from Mogul Embassy (Brian Cage, Bishop Kaun, and Toa Liona). On October 1 at WrestleDream, The Young Bucks won a four-way tag team match to earn another shot at FTR for their titles. On the November 1 episode of Dynamite, The Young Bucks and Page lost their titles lost to Mogul Embassy, ending their reign at 42 days. On November 18 at Full Gear, the Young Bucks lost their tag title shot to The Golden Jets (Chris Jericho and Kenny Omega).

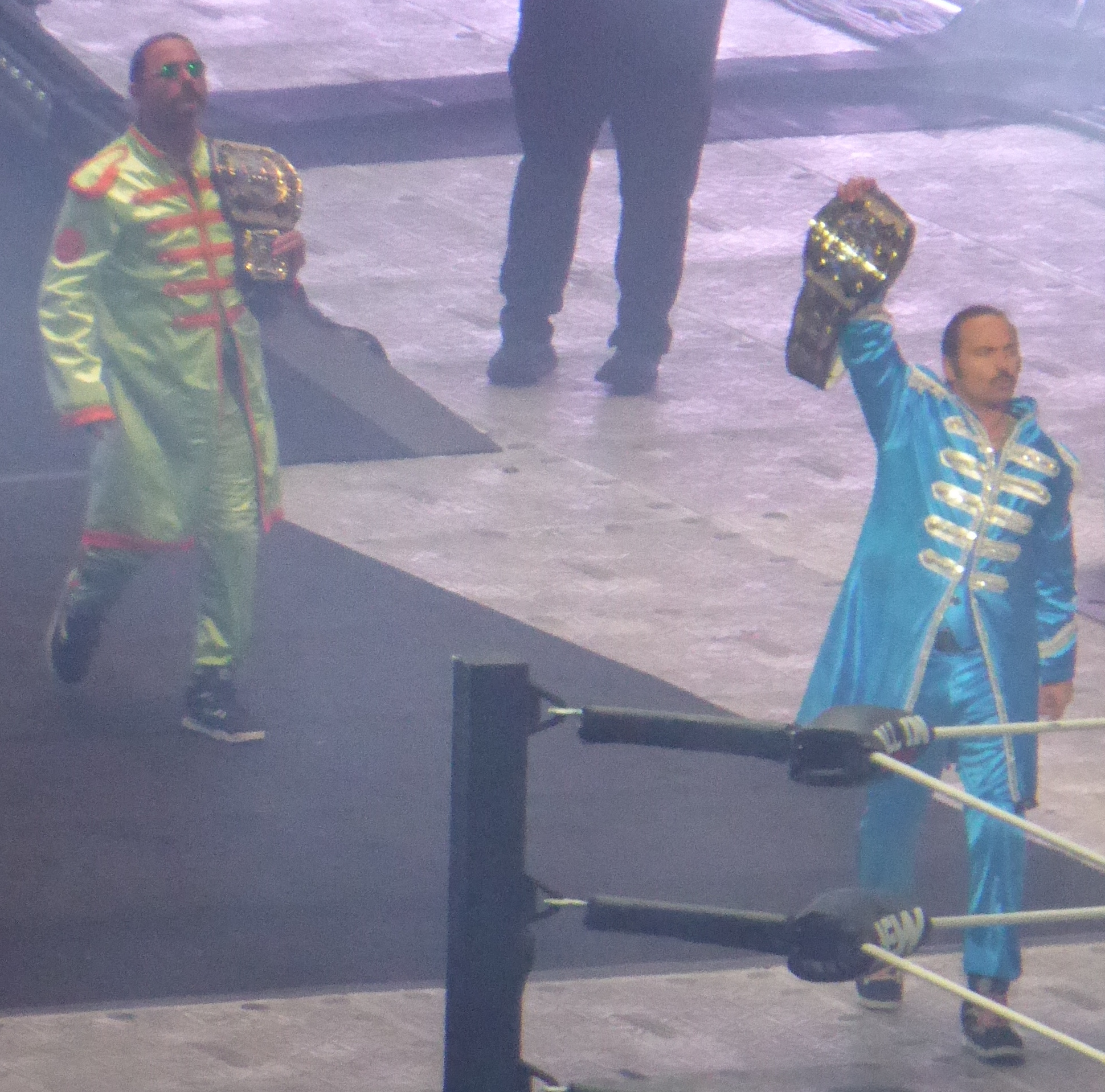
The Young Bucks (in Sgt. Pepper outfits) as AEW World Tag Team Champions at All In in August 2024

==== Executive Vice Presidents (2024–2025) ====
After losing at Full Gear, The Young Bucks went on a two-month hiatus before returning in January 2024, and confronting Sting and Darby Allin, setting up Sting's final match for Revolution in March. The Young Bucks subsequently became heels and embraced their roles as AEW executive vice presidents, individually preferring to be called Matthew and Nicholas Jackson. After Sting and Allin became AEW World Tag Team Champions, The Young Bucks moved up the rankings to become the number one contenders and were subsequently scheduled to challenge Sting and Allin for the title at Revolution in a tornado tag team match. At the event in what was Sting's retirement match, The Young Bucks were defeated by Sting and Allin. Outside of kayfabe, Sting chose The Young Bucks to be his final opponents. On the March 6, episode of Dynamite, The Young Bucks kicked Kenny Omega out of The Elite and introduced Kazuchika Okada as the newest member, with The Young Bucks assuming leadership of the group. At Dynasty, The Young Bucks defeated FTR to win the vacant AEW World Tag Team Championships for a record setting third time in a ladder match, with the help of a returning Jack Perry, who would subsequently join The Elite. On the April 24 episode of Dynamite, The Young Bucks, Perry, and Okada attacked AEW President and CEO Tony Khan. At Double or Nothing on May 26, The Elite defeated Team AEW (Bryan Danielson, Allin, and FTR) in an Anarchy in the Arena match. At Blood & Guts on July 24, The Elite were defeated by Team AEW, when Perry was doused in petrol and Allin threatened to set him on fire unless The Elite surrendered and offered him a TNT Championship title match. At All In, The Young Bucks successfully defended their titles against FTR and The Acclaimed. At Fright Night Dynamite on October 30, The Young Bucks lost their titles to Private Party, ending their third reign at 192 days. After the match, The Young Bucks gracefully handed the belts to Private Party, hinting at a face turn. Later in the show, The Young Bucks were seen in their locker room shredding apparent documents and proceeded to leave the arena, stating that AEW had become "too chaotic" for them and that they would be working from home going forward. It was then reported that The Young Bucks would be taking a hiatus from wrestling, allowing Nicholas to heal a shoulder injury.

On April 6, 2025 at Dynasty, The Young Bucks returned and assisted Jon Moxley retain his AEW World Championship against Swerve Strickland, aligning themselves with Moxley's stable the Death Riders. On May 25 at Double or Nothing, The Young Bucks and the Death Riders were defeated by Strickland, Kenny Omega, Willow Nightingale, and The Opps (Samoa Joe, Powerhouse Hobbs, and Katsuyori Shibata) in an Anarchy in the Arena match. After Double or Nothing, The Young Bucks continued their feud with Strickland after attacking both him and Will Ospreay at Dynamite: Summer Blockbuster on June 11, leading to a tag match being scheduled for All In on July 12, where The Young Bucks would be defeated by Strickand and Ospreay. Per the added stipulation of the match, The Young Bucks were stripped of their executive vice presidents positions of AEW (in kayfabe). After losing their EVP positions, The Young Bucks went back to being called by their shortened names "Matt and Nick Jackson".

==== Championship pursuits and face turn (2025–present) ====
The Young Bucks then entered a world tag title eliminator tournament, where the winners would receive a shot at the AEW World Tag Team Championships at Forbidden Door. They defeated The Outrunners (Truth Magnum and Turbo Floyd) in the first round but were eliminated by Brodido (Bandido and Brody King) in the semi-finals. On September 20 at All Out, The Young Bucks competed in a four-way Ladder match for the AEW World Tag Team Championships, but failed to win. After the match, The Young Bucks were attacked by a reformed Jurassic Express (Jack Perry and Luchasaurus). On October 18 at WrestleDream, The Young Bucks were defeated by Jurassic Express. At Full Gear on November 22, the Young Bucks teamed with Josh Alexander to defeat Omega and Jurassic Express; post-match, Alexander and the Don Callis Family (Lance Archer, Mark Davis, El Clon, and Hechicero) attacked Omega and Jurassic Express until the Young Bucks returned to aid them and thus turning face in the process. The Young Bucks and Omega then embraced, reuniting the original trio of The Elite.

On the February 11, 2026 episode of Dynamite, The Young Bucks defeated The Rascalz (Dezmond Xavier and Myron Reed) and Private Party in a three-way tag team match to earn an AEW World Tag Team Championship match against their long-time rivals FTR. At Revolution on March 15, The Young Bucks failed to defeat FTR for the tag titles. Over the following months, The Young Bucks would defeat Don Callis Family (Kazuchika Okada and Konosuke Takeshita) at Dynasty on April 12, win a three-way tag team match at Forbidden Door on June 30, and the Death Riders (Jon Moxley and Will Ospreay) at Redemption on July 26 to earn a rematch for the tag titles now held by Cage and Cope (Christian Cage and Adam Copeland). The title match between the two teams was held at All In on August 30, where The Young Bucks were defeated.

The Young Bucks would subsequently win their fourth AEW World Tag Team Championship at All Out in a three-way ladder match also involving Cage & Cope and FTR. On October 17 at WrestleDream, The Young Bucks successfully defended their titles against the Don Callis Family's Kevin Knight and Kyle Fletcher. At Full Gear on November 14, they successfully defended their titles against Davis and Doyle (Mark Davis and Jake Doyle).

=== Return to NJPW (2024–present) ===
On May 11, 2024 at Resurgence, The Young Bucks made their return to NJPW for the first time since 2019, where they attacked Eddie Kingston. On October 14 at King of Pro-Wrestling, The Young Bucks made another appearance in a pre-taped video, where they announced that they would make their return to Japan on January 5, 2025 at Wrestle Dynasty.

At Wrestle Dynasty, The Young Bucks defeated United Empire (Great-O-Khan and Jeff Cobb) and Los Ingobernables de Japon (Tetsuya Naito and Hiromu Takahashi) to win the IWGP Tag Team Championship for the second time. On February 11 at The New Beginning in Osaka, The Young Bucks lost their titles to Naito and Takahashi, ending their reign at 37 days. On May 9 at Resurgence, The Young Bucks teamed with the Good Brothers (Doc Gallows and Karl Anderson) to defeat the Bullet Club War Dogs (Clark Connors, David Finlay, Gabe Kidd, and Gedo).

== Other media ==
The Massies' autobiography, Killing the Business: From Backyards to the Big Leagues, was released on November 17, 2020.

== Personal lives ==
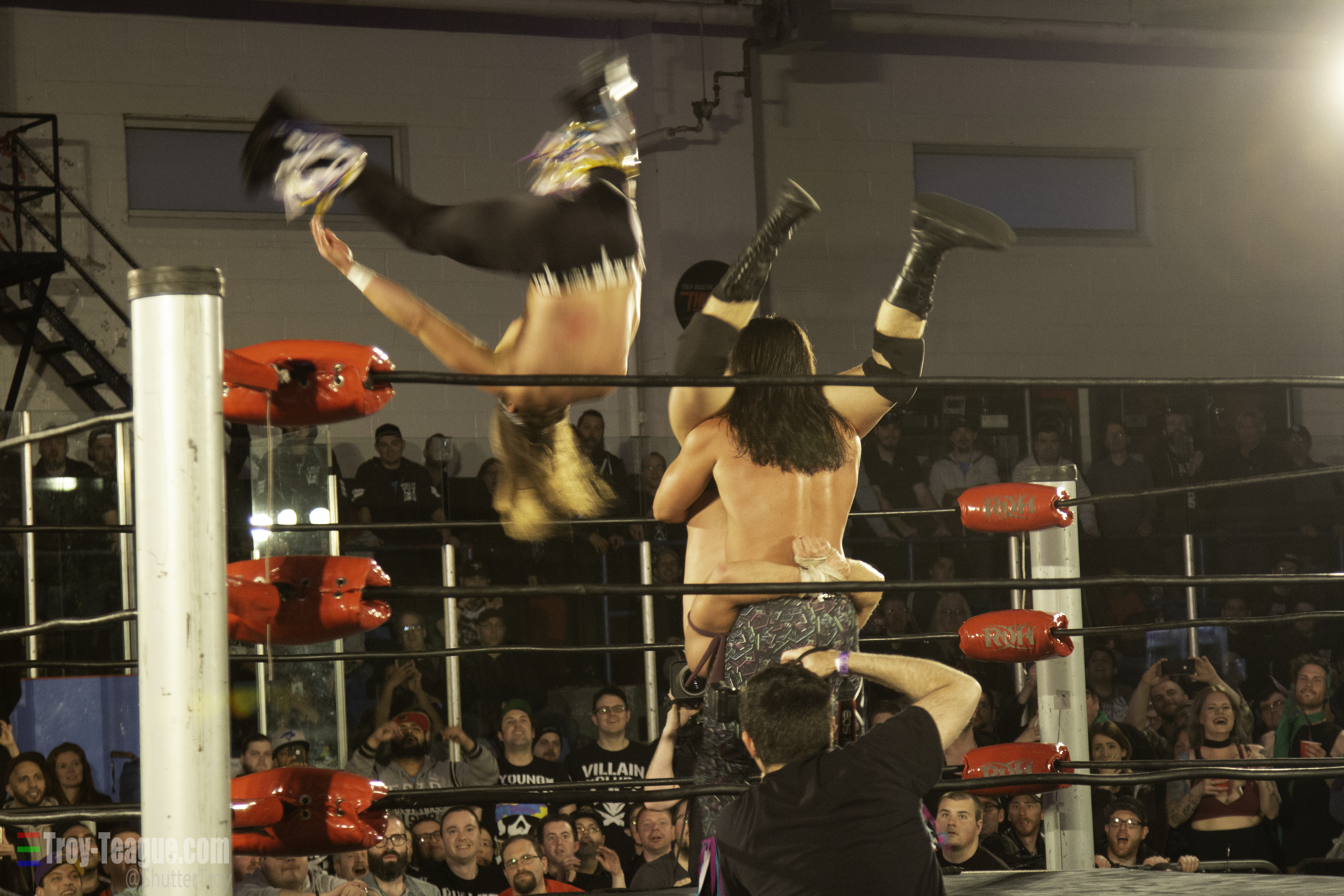
The Young Bucks performing the "Meltzer Driver", their tag team finishing move named after wrestling journalist and close friend Dave Meltzer

The Massies were both born in the Los Angeles suburb of Montebello, California, as the middle two of four children. Their parents are Joyce and Matthew Massie Sr. They also have a younger brother who was also a professional wrestler under the ring name Malachi Jackson, before retiring in 2010 due to being exhausted by traveling. They stayed in Rancho Cucamonga for nearly 18 years before moving to Hesperia, California in 2003. The Massies are both Christian.

The Massies are fans of wrestling journalist Dave Meltzer, whom they affectionately refer to as "Uncle Dave", having named one of their signature moves, the Meltzer Driver, after him. They have also dedicated wins on New Japan pay-per-views to him and stated that they wanted to win every Wrestling Observer Newsletter award in 2014. They ended up winning Tag Team of the Year and Best Wrestling Maneuver for the Meltzer Driver. After the death of Meltzer's father Herbert, The Young Bucks paid tribute to him at G1 Special in USA with a new version of the move, named the Herbert Meltzer Driver.

In addition to wrestling, the brothers produce and star in the YouTube series Being The Elite, with over 500,000 subscribers, showing the paths of being professional wrestlers, as well as comedic skits alongside fellow All Elite Wrestling personnel, including Kenny Omega and "Hangman" Adam Page.

== Championships and accomplishments ==
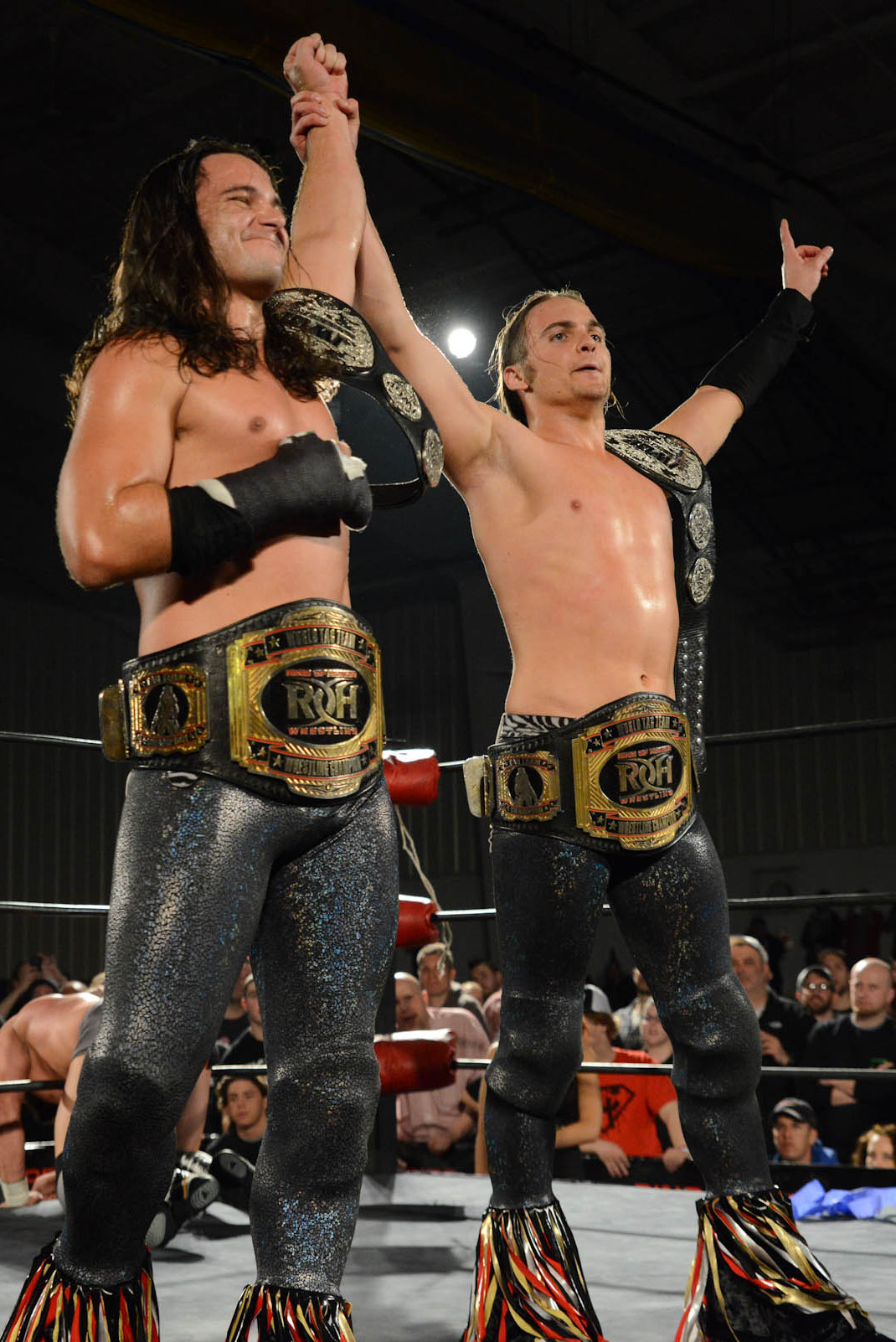
The Young Bucks – Matt and Nick – are three-time ROH World Tag Team Champions (around their waists), a record seven-time IWGP Junior Heavyweight Tag Team Champions (on their shoulders)...

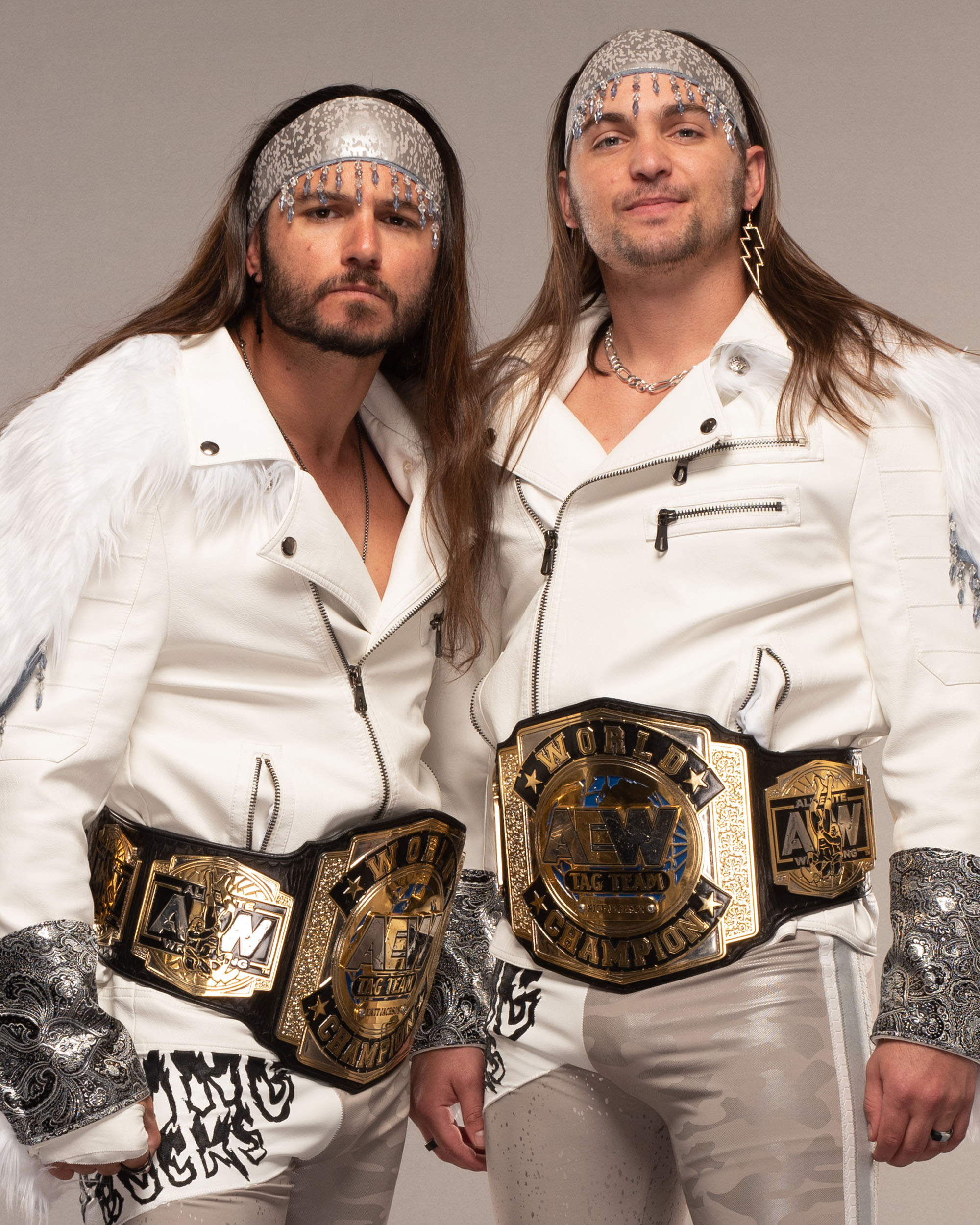
...record four-time, current and longest reigning AEW World Tag Team Champions...

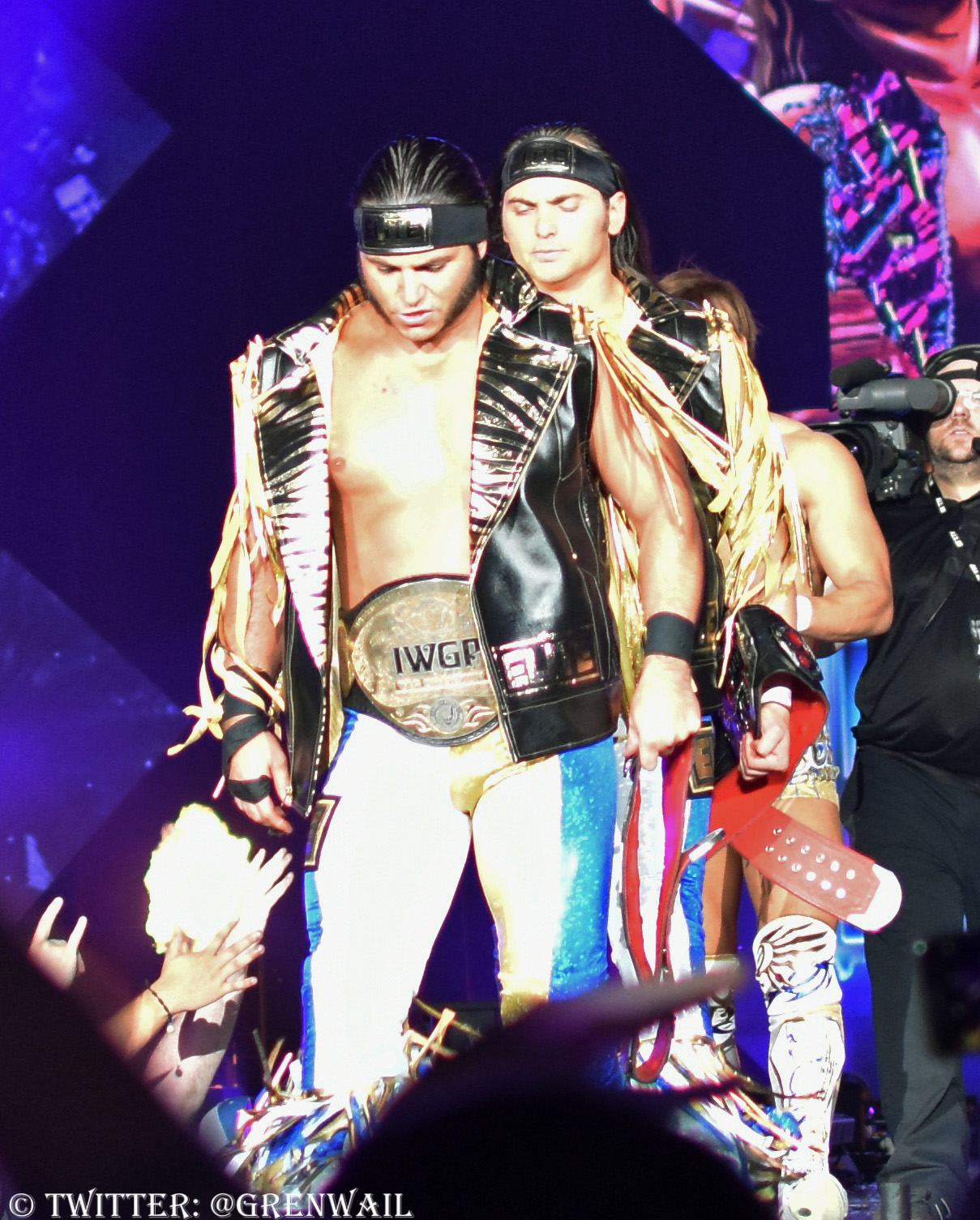
...and two-time IWGP Tag Team Champions.

- All Elite Wrestling
  - AEW World Tag Team Championship (4 times, current)
  - AEW World Trios Championship (2 times, inaugural) – with Kenny Omega
  - AEW World Trios Championship Tournament (2022) – with Kenny Omega
  - Casino Tag Team Royale (2022)
  - Dynamite Award (3 times)
    - LOL Award (2021) – The Young Bucks kick MJF into a pool – Chris Jericho's Rock 'N' Wrestling Rager at Sea (January 22)
    - Bleacher Report PPV Moment of the Year (2021) – Stadium Stampede match (The Elite vs. The Inner Circle) at Double or Nothing
    - Best Tag Team Brawl (2022) – Young Bucks vs Lucha Brothers, Steel Cage Match
- Alternative Wrestling Show
  - AWS Tag Team Championship (1 time)
- Chikara
  - Campeonatos de Parejas (1 time)
- DDT Pro-Wrestling
  - Ironman Heavymetalweight Championship (2 reigns, 75 days)
    Second reign belongs to their autobiography
- Demand Lucha
  - Royal Canadian Tag Team Championship (1 time)
- Dragon Gate USA
  - Open the United Gate Championship (1 time)
- Empire Wrestling Federation
  - EWF Tag Team Championship (1 time)
- Family Wrestling Entertainment
  - FWE Tag Team Championship (1 time, final)
- Future Stars of Wrestling
  - FSW Tag Team Championship (1 time)
- High Risk Wrestling
  - HRW Heavyweight Championship (2 times) – Matt Jackson (1) and Nick Jackson (2)
  - HRW Tag Team Championship (1 time)
  - Sole Survivor Tournament (2006) – Nick Jackson
- House of Glory
  - HOG Tag Team Championship (1 time)
  - HOG Tag Team Championship Tournament (2013)
- Insane Wrestling League
  - IWL Tag Team Championship (3 times)
- Lucha Libre AAA Worldwide
  - AAA World Tag Team Championship (1 time)
- New Japan Pro-Wrestling
  - IWGP Tag Team Championship (2 times)
  - IWGP Junior Heavyweight Tag Team Championship (7 times)
  - NEVER Openweight 6-Man Tag Team Championship (3 times) – with Kenny Omega (2) and Marty Scurll (1)
  - Super Jr. Tag Tournament (2013)
- New York Post
  - Tag Team of the Year (2024)
- Pro Wrestling Destination
  - PWD Tag Team Championship (1 time)
- Pro Wrestling Guerrilla
  - PWG World Tag Team Championship (4 times)
  - Dynamite Duumvirate Tag Team Title Tournament (2009, 2011, 2013)
- Pro Wrestling Illustrated
  - Match of the Year (2020) vs Kenny Omega and Adam Page at Revolution
  - Tag Team of the Year (2017, 2018, 2021)
  - Ranked Nick Jackson No. 38 of the top 500 singles wrestlers in the PWI 500 in 2018
  - Ranked Matt Jackson No. 40 of the top 500 singles wrestlers in the PWI 500 in 2018
  - Ranked The Young Bucks No. 1 of the top 50 Tag Teams in the PWI Tag Team 50 in 2021
- Pro Wrestling LIVE
  - PWL Tag Team Championship (1 time)
- Ring of Honor
  - ROH World Tag Team Championship (3 times)
  - ROH World Six-Man Tag Team Championship (3 times) – with Adam Page (2) and Cody (1)
  - ROH Year-End Award (1 time)
    - Tag Team of the Year (2017)
- SoCal Uncensored
  - Southern California Match of the Year (2011) vs. Kevin Steen and Super Dragon at PWG Fear
  - Southern California Match of the Year (2012) vs. Future Shock (Adam Cole and Kyle O'Reilly) and Super Smash Bros. (Player Uno and Stupefied) at PWG Threemendous
  - Southern California Match of the Year (2013) vs. DojoBros (Eddie Edwards and Roderick Strong) and Inner City Machine Guns (Rich Swann and Ricochet) at PWG Ten
  - Southern California Match of the Year (2016) with Adam Cole vs. Matt Sydal, Ricochet and Will Ospreay at PWG Battle of Los Angeles
  - Southern California Match of the Year (2018) vs. Golden☆Lovers (Kenny Omega and Kota Ibushi) at NJPW Strong Style Evolved
  - Southern California Tag Team of the Year (2007–2009, 2014–2015)
- Squared Circle Wrestling (Syracuse, New York)
  - 2CW Tag Team Championship (1 time, final)
- World Series Wrestling
  - WSW Tag Team Championship (1 time, inaugural)
  - WSW Tag Team Title Tournament (2018)
- Wrestling Observer Newsletter
  - Best Wrestling Maneuver (2009) More Bang for Your Buck
  - Best Wrestling Maneuver (2014) Meltzer Driver
  - Tag Team of the Year (2014–2018, 2020, 2021, 2024, 2025)
  - Pro Wrestling Match of the Year (2020) vs Kenny Omega and Adam Page at Revolution
  - Pro Wrestling Match of the Year (2021) vs. the Lucha Brothers at All Out
  - Best Pro Wrestling Book (2020) Killing the Business
  - Tag Team of the Decade (2010s)
  - Wrestling Observer Newsletter Hall of Fame (2024)

== Bibliography ==
- Young Bucks: Killing the Business from Backyards to the Big Leagues (Dey Street Books, 2020, Hardcover) ISBN 0-06293-783-9, ISBN 978-0062937834
