= Ironman Heavymetalweight Championship =

Professional wrestling championship

- The Ironman Heavymetalweight Championship belt (2025–present)

Details
- Promotion: CyberFight
- Brand: DDT Pro-Wrestling
- Date established: June 29, 2000
- Current champion: Yoshihiko
- Date won: November 3, 2026
Statistics
- First champion: Poison Sawada Black
- Most reigns: Shinobu (216 reigns)
- Longest reign: Masa Takanashi (333 days)
- Oldest champion: Yoshiaki Fujiwara (63 years, 113 days)
- Youngest champion: Shimon Nagao (3 years)

The Ironman Heavymetalweight Championship (Japanese: アイアンマンヘビーメタル級王座, Hepburn: Aianman Hebīmetaru-kyū Ōza) is a professional wrestling championship created and promoted by the Japanese promotion CyberFight in its DDT Pro-Wrestling (DDT) brand. Open to anyone, regardless of gender or DDT employment status, the championship is defended "24/7", as in any time, anywhere, as long as a referee is there to confirm the win. Because of this rule, not only is the championship winnable regardless of gender or number of individuals (in case of a common pinfall or submission), it is also available to "unconventional" champions such as animals or inanimate objects, with title changes regularly occurring outside of regular shows, often with videos posted on the promotion's social media accounts.

The championship was introduced on the June 29, 2000 TV taping, during which Poison Sawada Black created the title and awarded it to himself. It was created as a parody of the now-defunct WWE Hardcore Championship, which also had a "24/7 rule". The title is often defended during a 10-minute battle royal, with the current holder not being allowed to leave the match until the end of the time limit; as per 24/7 rules, the championship can change hands during, and not only as the result, of the match. Despite its name and similarly titled championships, it is not specific to Iron Man matches.

== History ==
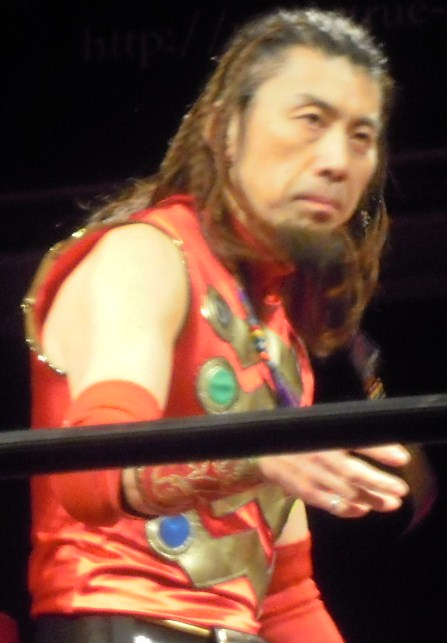
Inaugural Ironman Heavymetalweight Champion Poison Sawada Black

On November 2, 1998, Mr. McMahon awarded Mankind the World Wrestling Federation (WWF) Hardcore Championship. As Mankind and hardcore wrestling became more popular with audiences, the Hardcore Championship became a more serious title. Its popularity led competitor World Championship Wrestling (WCW) to create its own Hardcore Championship, a move followed by numerous independent promotions. When Crash Holly won the belt on February 22, 2000, he introduced the "24/7 rule" that the belt was to be defended at all times as long as a referee was present.

On June 29, 2000, Poison Julie Sawada introduced the Ironman Heavymetalweight Championship in DDT as a parody of the WWF Hardcore title and recognized himself as the first champion. Minutes after the unveiling, Mitsunobu Kikuzawa demanded he have a look at the title belt. He then used it to attack Sawada and pinned him to become the second champion.

The 1,000th Ironman Heavymetalweight Champion was crowned on April 29, 2014, when the title belt itself became the champion by pinning Sanshiro Takagi. At Ultimate Party 2023, the championship belt was won by a different title, the IWGP Junior Heavyweight Championship, which pinned its holder at the time, Hiromu Takahashi, only to lose the Ironman title seconds later to Kazuki Hirata.

On May 31, 2025, Poison Sawada Julie won the title back for a tenth time. He announced that he would unveil a new belt for the title at King of Kings, on June 29, for the 25th anniversary of the title.

=== Belt design ===
First Ironman Heavymetalweight Championship design (2000–2025)

The original championship belt design featured three glittery silver plates on a black leather strap which had a snake skin pattern on the back. The central plate featured brass knuckles surrounded by chains in the center. The word "IRONMAN" was written along the edge of the top half and the word "CHAMPION", though partially erased by years of wear and tear, was written along the bottom edge. The two side plates, on either side of the central plate, were rectangular and identically stated "24 HOURS" ("24" in silver bordered with black; "HOURS" in red).

The new design, which was introduced for the title's 25th anniversary, features five gray plates. The center plate has golden brass knuckles in the middle. "DDT IRONMAN" is written along the top edge, and "HEAVYMETALWEIGHT CHAMPION" is written along the bottom edge. The inner side plates feature "365" in black on top of a globe on one side, and "24/7" surrounded by a sun and a moon on the other. The two outer side plates depict wrestlers performing submission holds.

== Reigns ==
As of November 3, 2026, there have been 1,931 officially recognized reigns between 470 different human individuals, 8 teams and 66 inanimate objects and animals. The record for most reigns is held by Shinobu, who won it 216 times, including by trading the title back-and-forth with 215-time champion Yuko Miyamoto a total of 303 times on the same night. Danshoku Dino holds the record for longest combined reign with at least 534 days and counting (the exact date of when he won his tenth title is uncertain). Masa Takanashi's sixth reign is the longest singular reign at 333 days. Only 166 individuals have held the title for longer than a day. The title has occasionally been won by unusual means, such as an auction for the belt, rock paper scissors, and even a title change that occurred in a dream.

Non-wrestlers to have held the title include AV idol Nao Saejima, voice actors Sumire Uesaka and Tasuku Hatanaka, TV personality LiLiCo, J-pop idols Akari Suda, Kaori Matsumura, Rise Shiokawa, Aika Sawaguchi, Misaki Natsumi, Momomi Wagatsuma and Lingling, Tokyo Metropolitan Assemblyman Shinichiro Kawamatsu, a cat named Bunny, a monkey, a three-time champion ladder, Vince McMahon's Hollywood Walk of Fame star, a copy of The Young Bucks' autobiography Killing the Business, and the title belt itself.

=== Notable champions ===
As of January 2026, there have been over 1,800 title changes for the belt, which has been won by numerous male and female wrestlers and non-wrestlers, including children, animals, entire audiences and inanimate objects.

==== Animals ====
- Yatchan – monkey
- Cocolo – miniature Dachshund dog
- Bunny – cat

==== Inanimate objects ====
- Ladder – steel ladder (Note: Would fall on the champion and a pinfall was counted. Ladder successfully defended the title by not being pinned during the time limit battle royal matches. Ladder was a three-time champion and the first inanimate object to win the title. DDT held a formal retirement ceremony for the ladder in September 2003.)
- Kitty-Chan – stuffed Hello Kitty doll
- Mah-Kun – another stuffed doll, who defeated Kitty-Chan for the belt
- Zeestar – Zeekstar Tokyo's mascot
- A baseball bat (Note: Lost the belt after being broken in half as a KO decision.)
- Chiririn – chicken doll
- Mr. Kasai – stuffed Jun Kasai doll
- A Pro Wrestling Wave poster
- Big Japan Pro Wrestling ring truck
- Ice Ribbon ringside mat
- A pint of beer
- Three different sticks of yakitori
- Two different steel chairs
- "Kōmyō" – calligraphy by actor Akihiro Miwa
- The title belt itself
- The IWGP Junior Heavyweight Championship belt
- Yoshihiko – ragdoll, considered a full time member of the roster (Note: Wrestlers treat it as if it actually was an active wrestler, and actually sell moves "done" by them, mostly high flying moves. For some moves, like outside dives, Yoshihiko is helped by one or more assistants, who throw them out of the ring, pull their foot on the ropes, etc. Opposing wrestlers act as if those assistants are not there and are part of Yoshihiko. The original Yoshihiko was an inflatable love doll. They were "killed" by a knee drop from Antonio Honda, which caused their head to burst open, and was replaced by a second Yoshihiko, who was also a love doll, only modified to resemble the Great Muta. The second Yoshihiko was killed by Kenny Omega by a giant swing that sent Yoshihiko out of the ring, thus splitting his head open and revealing cotton stuffing. Later on in that match however, a third Yoshihiko came out resembling The Undertaker's old American Bad Ass gimmick, even using the same theme music. Following that match, the third Yoshihiko was shot to death by Antonio Honda. A fourth Yoshihiko, resembling Hulk Hogan, debuted shortly afterwards.)
- Akihiro – inflatable love doll, sibling of Yoshihiko (Note: Made its debut on August 18, 2013)
- Vince McMahon's Hollywood Walk of Fame star
- A bus
- TV Tokyo camera crane
- Yellow iPhone 14
- A pork bun
- A kotatsu table
- A trash bin
- Pair of chopsticks
- RN: Konyamoanokodenuitarou – printed E-mail
- A beer can (Note: Champion Yukio Sakaguchi drank from the can and fell backwards with the can on top of him. The referee counted the pin. The can lost the belt after Yuki Ueno drank its remaining contents.)
- Killing the Business – a copy of the Young Bucks' autobiography
- An apple
- A christmas tree
- Stefan the Dinosaur – Unagi Sayaka's stuffed dinosaur
- Maya Yukihi's whip
- Raku's pillow
- Mizuki's hammer
- Hyper Misao's bicycle
- A recorder belonging to Up Up Girls 2 member Aya Kajishima (Note: Kajishima played a lullaby on the recorder to put then-holder Raku to sleep, intending to pin her safely after doing so; however, the referee awarded the belt to the recorder instead. Kajishima subsequently pinned the recorder.)
- Pro wrestling venue Shinjuku Face to commemorate its closing

==== Non-existent ====
- Arnold Skeskejanaker – "invisible wrestler" i.e. non-existent. Opponents sell moves of a wrestler who isn't there, and the title is held by nothing and no-one but the wrestlers and referees act as if they can see and pin the "invisible wrestler". Muscle Sakai "won" the title from this "invisible wrestler" by using a "ray gun" and "infrared visor" to shoot the "invisible wrestler", winning the belt on a KO decision.
- The Invisible Man – another "invisible wrestler"

==== Collective champions ====
- Three elementary school girls (Airi Ueda, Shiori Takahashi and Minami Tanabe)
- The Addiction (Christopher Daniels and Frankie Kazarian)
- The entire audience of Beyond Wrestling's Americanrana '16 event
- The Young Bucks (Matt Jackson and Nick Jackson)
- Hiroshi Yamato and Toru Owashi
- Mizuki Watase, Antonio Honda, Danshoku Dino and Yukio Naya
- The 100,000 subscribers to DDT's official YouTube channel
- Masanori Kishigawa and Mizuki Takashima, two junior priests of the Kanda Shrine

== See also ==
- WWE Hardcore Championship – a title with a similar 24/7 rule
- WWE 24/7 Championship – a title with a similar 24/7 rule
