= DDT Audience =

Audience
- Promotions: DDT Pro-Wrestling
- First event: Audience 2003
- Last event: Audience 2022

Audience was a recurring professional wrestling event held by DDT Pro-Wrestling (DDT) in spring. Originally held by DDT as an independent promotion between 2003 and 2018, it was then held by CyberFight as DDT-branded events. The first of these was a tour of smaller events outside of Tokyo in May 2021, followed by one final main edition in 2022.

== History ==
Between 2003 and 2018, Audience was produced by DDT Pro-Wrestling, an independent promotion founded in 1997 by Shintaro Muto and Pro Wrestling Crusaders alumni Kyohei Mikami, Kazushige Nosawa and Sanshiro Takagi. The event was held in spring. In 2020, DDT and its subsidiaries merged with Pro Wrestling Noah into a new company called CyberFight owned by the digital advertising company CyberAgent, with DDT and Noah persisting as separate brands under the CyberFight umbrella. The Audience name was then used in May 2021 for a tour of smaller events held in Hamamatsu, Fukuoka and Kumamoto. Finally, it was used for one last edition in 2022.

== Events ==
#	Event	Date	City	Venue	Main event	Ref.
1	Audience 2003	July 17, 2003	Tokyo, Japan	Korakuen Hall	Mikami (c) vs. Takashi Sasaki for the KO-D Openweight Championship	
2	Audience 2004	July 1, 2004	Tokyo, Japan	Korakuen Hall	Akarengers (Takashi Sasaki and Gentaro) (c) vs. Sanshiro Takagi and Ryuji Ito for the KO-D Tag Team Championship	
3	Audience 2005	June 29, 2005	Tokyo, Japan	Korakuen Hall	Sanshiro Takagi (c) vs. Kudo for the KO-D Openweight Championship	
4	Audience 2006	June 4, 2006	Tokyo, Japan	Korakuen Hall	Sanshiro Takagi and Poison Sawada Julie vs. Tatsutoshi Goto and Mitsuya "Who?" Nagai in a no disqualification match	
5	Audience 2007	July 1, 2007	Tokyo, Japan	Korakuen Hall	Koo (c) vs. Kudo for the KO-D Openweight Championship	
6	Audience 2015	May 31, 2015	Tokyo, Japan	Korakuen Hall	Harashima (c) vs. Kudo for the KO-D Openweight Championship	
7	Audience 2016	May 29, 2016	Tokyo, Japan	Korakuen Hall	Daisuke Sasaki (c) vs. Konosuke Takeshita for the KO-D Openweight Championship	
8	Audience 2017	May 28, 2017	Tokyo, Japan	Korakuen Hall	Konosuke Takeshita (c) vs. Yasu Urano for the KO-D Openweight Championship	
9	Audience 2018	May 20, 2018	Tokyo, Japan	Korakuen Hall	Shigehiro Irie (c) vs. Keisuke Ishii for the KO-D Openweight Championship	
10	Audience 2022	May 22, 2022	Tokyo, Japan	Korakuen Hall	Damnation T.A. (Daisuke Sasaki, Kanon and MJ Paul) vs. Eruption (Yukio Sakaguchi, Kazusada Higuchi and Hideki Okatani) for the vacant KO-D 6-Man Tag Team Championship	

== Results ==
=== 2003 ===
Audience 2003
- Promotion: Dramatic Dream Team
- Date: July 17, 2003
- City: Tokyo, Japan
- Venue: Korakuen Hall
- Attendance: 1,506

Audience chronology
← Previous —	Next → 2004

No.	Results	Stipulations	Times
1	Hero! defeated O.K.Revolution and Azusa Kudo	Two-on-one handicap match	8:20
2	Thanomsak Toba and Daichi Kakimoto defeated Kudo and Shuji Ishikawa	Tag team match	10:20
3	Tomohiko Hashimoto, Yuki Nishino and Miyuki Maeda defeated Super Uchuu Power, Issei Fujisawa and Yuki Miyazaki	Six-person tag team match	9:23
4	Mr. Strawberry (Cpt), Yoshihiro Sakai and Ofune (with Showa-ko) defeated Mr. Amegican (Cpt), Seiya Morohashi and Futoshi Miwa (with Miwa Kaicho and Thunder)	Captain's Fall Máscara Contra Máscara six-person tag team match	17:11
5	Takashi Sasaki defeated Mikami (c)	Singles match for the KO-D Openweight Championship	21:38
(c) / – the champion(s) heading into the match

=== 2004 ===
Audience 2004
- Promotion: DDT Pro-Wrestling
- Date: July 1, 2004
- City: Tokyo, Japan
- Venue: Korakuen Hall
- Attendance: 1,482

Audience chronology
← Previous; 2003	Next → 2005

No.	Results	Stipulations	Times
1	Kudo defeated Kota Ibushi	Singles match	6:30
2	NEO Machine Guns (Yuki Miyazaki and Tanny Mouse) defeated Showa-ko and Cherry	Tag team match	10:12
3	Suicideboyz (Mikami and Thanomsak Toba) defeated Daichi Kakimoto and Masahiro Takanashi	Tag team match	8:50
4	Jako Kyodan (Poison Sawada Julie, Yusuke Inokuma and Gorgeous Matsuno) defeated Hero!, Shuji Ishikawa and Futoshi Miwa	Six-man tag team match	12:30
5	Koichiro Kimura and Katsuhiko Nakajima defeated Danshoku Dino and Kenshin	Tag team match	13:18
6	Kensuke Sasaki and Agira Hokuto defeated Tomohiko Hashimoto and Seiya Morohashi	Tag team match	7:29
7	Sanshiro Takagi and Ryuji Ito defeated Akarengers (Takashi Sasaki and Gentaro) (c)	Tag team match for the KO-D Tag Team Championship	17:36
(c) / – the champion(s) heading into the match

=== 2005 ===
Audience 2005
- Promotion: DDT Pro-Wrestling
- Date: June 29, 2005
- City: Tokyo, Japan
- Venue: Korakuen Hall
- Attendance: 1,338

Audience chronology
← Previous; 2004	Next → 2006

No.	Results	Stipulations	Times
1	Tomohiko Hashimoto defeated Toshi	Singles match	5:59
2	Cherry won by last pinning Gorgeous Matsuno (Note: Other participants included The Bloody (interim champion), Yuki Miyazaki, Maru, Toshie Uematsu, Yumi Ohka, and Keiko Saito.)	10-minute Battle Royal for the Ironman Heavymetalweight Championship	10:00
3	Rey Cubano and Havana Guerrero (with Antonio Honda) defeated Daichi Kakimoto and Kota Ibushi	Tag team match	13:18
4	Jako Kyodan (Poison Sawada Julie, Akeomi Nitta, Osamu Namiguchi and Jun Inomata) defeated Danshoku Dino, Yusuke Inokuma, Muscle Sakai and Shuji Ishikawa	Death Fight	13:18
5	MoroToba (Seiya Morohashi and Thanomsak Toba) (c) defeated Shoichi Ichimya and Futoshi Miwa	Tag team match for the KO-D Tag Team Championship	11:48
6	Toru Owashi and Shogo Takagi defeated Mikami and Hero!	No disqualification tag team match	12:47
7	Sanshiro Takagi (c) defeated Kudo	Singles match for the KO-D Openweight Championship	15:31
(c) / – the champion(s) heading into the match

=== 2006 ===
Audience 2006
- Promotion: DDT Pro-Wrestling
- Date: June 4, 2006
- City: Tokyo, Japan
- Venue: Korakuen Hall
- Attendance: 1,588

Audience chronology
← Previous; 2004	Next → 2006

No.	Results	Stipulations	Times
1^{D}	The Mac defeated Antonio Honda by disqualification	Singles match	5:36
2	Seiya Morohashi defeated Masami Morohashi	Singles match	7:43
3	Harashima and Guillermo "Chango" Akiba defeated Daichi Kakimoto and Tomomitsu Matsunaga	Tag team match	10:23
4	Milano Collection A. T. defeated Kota Ibushi	Singles match	11:37
5	Toru Owashi won by last eliminating King Pocoda and Muscle Sakai (Note: Other participants included Máscara Gayrrero Jr., Michael Nakazawa, and Yusuke Inokuma.)	Six-man Disaster Box New Members Selection Battle Royal	10:17
6	Italian Four Horsemen (Francesco Togo and Mori Bernard) (c) defeated Suicideboyz (Mikami and Thanomsak Toba)	Tag team match for the KO-D Tag Team Championship	21:18
7	Sanshiro Takagi and Poison Sawada Julie defeated Tatsutoshi Goto and Mitsuya "Who?" Nagai	No disqualification match	18:53
(c) / – the champion(s) heading into the match; D / – this was a dark match

=== 2007 ===
Audience 2007
- Promotion: DDT Pro-Wrestling
- Date: July 1, 2007
- City: Tokyo, Japan
- Venue: Korakuen Hall
- Attendance: 1,185

Audience chronology
← Previous; 2006	Next → 2015

No.	Results	Stipulations	Times
1^{D}	Gorgeous Matsuno vs. Koryuki ended in a time limit draw	Singles match	10:00
2	Seiya Morohashi defeated Masa Takanashi	Singles match	9:10
3	Suicideboyz (Mikami and Thanomsak Toba) and Hoshitango defeated Fruits Army (Mango Fukuda, Durian Sawada Julie and Japanese Balloon)	Six-man tag team match	9:22
4	Sanshiro Takagi and Kota Ibushi defeated Katsumi Usuda and Manabu Hara	Tag team match	13:24
5	Nurunuru Brothers (Michael Nakazawa and Tomomitsu Matsunaga) (c) vs. Italian Four Horsemen (Prince Togo and Antonio "The Dragon" Honda) ended in a double countout	Tag team match for the KO-D Tag Team Championship	10:17
6	Toru Owashi vs. Harashima vs. Danshoku Dino vs. Muscle Sakai vs. Yusuke Inokuma ended in a no contest (Note: The match was restarted twice, ending in a no contest decision each time.)	Five-way ladder match for the Disaster Box elder stock	9:38
7	Koo (c) defeated Kudo	Singles match for the KO-D Openweight Championship	19:06
(c) / – the champion(s) heading into the match; D / – this was a dark match

=== 2015 ===
Audience 2015
- Promotion: DDT Pro-Wrestling
- Date: May 31, 2015
- City: Tokyo, Japan
- Venue: Korakuen Hall
- Attendance: 2,200

Audience chronology
← Previous; 2007	Next → 2016

No.	Results	Stipulations	Times
1^{D}	Kota Umeda defeated Gota Ihashi (c)	Singles match for the King of Dark Championship; As a result, Ihashi retained his title.	3:43
2	Shuten Doji (Yukio Sakaguchi and Masa Takanashi) and Saki Akai defeated Smile Squash (Yasu Urano and Akito) and Aja Kong	Six-person tag team match	9:20
3	T2Hii (Sanshiro Takagi and Kazuki Hirata) and Arrogant Bastards (Devin Sparks and Ric Ellis) defeated Toru Owashi, Tomomitsu Matsunaga, DJ Nira and Kouki Iwasaki	Eight-man tag team match	8:22
4	Mikami and Shuji Ishikawa defeated Kazusada Higuchi and Shunma Katsumata	Tag team match	9:50
5	Mohoshinki (Danshoku Dino and Makoto Oishi) and Super Sasadango Machine defeated Happy Motel (Antonio Honda and Konosuke Takeshita) and Hiroshi Fukuda	Six-man tag team match	11:56
6	Team Dream Futures (Keisuke Ishii, Shigehiro Irie and Soma Takao) (c) defeated Golden☆Storm Riders (Kota Ibushi, Daisuke Sasaki and Suguru Miyatake)	Six-man tag team match for the KO-D 6-Man Tag Team Championship	13:53
7	Kudo defeated Harashima (c)	Singles match for the KO-D Openweight Championship	23:27
(c) / – the champion(s) heading into the match; D / – this was a dark match

=== 2016 ===
Audience 2016
- Promotion: DDT Pro-Wrestling
- Date: May 29, 2016
- City: Tokyo, Japan
- Venue: Korakuen Hall
- Attendance: 1,633

Audience chronology
← Previous; 2015	Next → 2017

No.	Results	Stipulations	Times
1^{D}	Tomomitsu Matsunaga and Kouki Iwasaki defeated Heddi French and Rekka	Tag team match	5:50
2	Kenso (with Cherry) defeated Sanshiro Takagi	Singles match As a result, Kenso earned a spot in the 2016 King of DDT Tournament.	5:59
3	Danshoku Dino, Joey Ryan and Antonio Honda defeated Shuten Doji (Masa Takanashi and Kota Umeda) and Saki Akai, Kat-Too (Makoto Oishi and Shunma Katsumata) and Mao Inoue, and T2Hii (Toru Owashi and Kazuki Hirata) and Guanchulo	Anywhere Start four-way six-person tag team match	8:01
4	Shuji Ishikawa and Mad Paulie defeated Tetsuya Endo and Kazusada Higuchi	Tag team match	8:02
5	LiLiCo defeated Super Sasadango Machine (c)	Singles match for the DDT Extreme Championship	7:05
6	Team Dream Futures (Keisuke Ishii, Shigehiro Irie and Soma Takao) (c) defeated Smile Squash (Harashima, Akito and Yasu Urano)	Six-man tag team match for the KO-D 6-Man Tag Team Championship	9:57
7	Konosuke Takeshita defeated Daisuke Sasaki (c)	Singles match for the KO-D Openweight Championship	24:42
(c) / – the champion(s) heading into the match; D / – this was a dark match

=== 2017 ===
Audience 2017
- Promotion: DDT Pro-Wrestling
- Date: May 28, 2017
- City: Tokyo, Japan
- Venue: Korakuen Hall
- Attendance: 1,384

Audience chronology
← Previous; 2016	Next → 2018

No.	Results	Stipulations	Times
1^{P}	Mad Paulie defeated Tomomitsu Matsunaga	Singles match	5:03
2	Shuten Doji (Kudo, Yukio Sakaguchi and Masahiro Takanashi) defeated T2Hii (Toru Owashi and Hirata Collection A. T.) and Hiranito Collection a. t.	Italian rules match	5:57
3	Saki Akai and Heidi Katrina defeated Antonio Honda and Nobuhiro Shimatani	Tag team match	3:36
4	NωA (Makoto Oishi, Shunma Katsumata and Mao) (c) defeated Fantastic Memories (Danshoku Dino and Keisuke Ishii) and Royce Isaacs	Six-man tag team match for the KO-D 6-Man Tag Team Championship	5:26
5	Smile Squash (Harashima and Soma Takao) defeated All Out (Akito and Diego)	Tag team match	9:21
6	Minoru Suzuki and Rocky Kawamura defeated Sanshiro Takagi and Super Sasadango Machine	Tag team match	10:44
7	Damnation (Daisuke Sasaki, Shuji Ishikawa and Tetsuya Endo) defeated Shigehiro Irie, Kazusada Higuchi and Kouki Iwasaki	Six-man tag team match	8:55
8	Konosuke Takeshita (c) defeated Yasu Urano	Singles match for the KO-D Openweight Championship	28:31
(c) / – the champion(s) heading into the match; P / – the match was broadcast on the pre-show

=== 2018 ===
Audience 2018
- Promotion: DDT Pro-Wrestling
- Date: May 20, 2018
- City: Tokyo, Japan
- Venue: Korakuen Hall
- Attendance: 1,064

Audience chronology
← Previous; 2017	Next → 2022

No.	Results	Stipulations	Times
1^{P}	Tomomitsu Matsunaga defeated Rekka	Singles match	5:55
2	Takatimo Dragón, Hiratino Dragón, Rihotimo Dragón and Toru Owashi defeated Shuten Doji (Kudo, Yukio Sakaguchi and Masahiro Takanashi) and Saki Akai by disqualification	Eight-person tag team match	7:26
3	Damnation (Tetsuya Endo and Mad Paulie) defeated Kouki Iwasaki and Shota, Mike Bailey and Mao, and Jason "The Gift" Kincaid and Mizuki Watase	Four-way tag team match	6:30
4	Kota Umeda vs. Kazusada Higuchi ended in a double knockout	Singles match	6:58
5	Konosuke Takeshita defeated Shunma Katsumata	Singles match	13:01
6	Danshoku Dino, Antonio Honda and Super Sasadango Machine defeated Makoto Oishi, Nobuhiro Shimatani and Daiki Shimomura (with Yuki Iino)	Six-man tag team match	9:44
7	Soma Takao defeated Harashima	Singles match	8:41
8	Shigehiro Irie (c) defeated Keisuke Ishii	Singles match for the KO-D Openweight Championship	18:25
(c) / – the champion(s) heading into the match; P / – the match was broadcast on the pre-show

=== 2022 ===
Audience 2022
- Promotion: DDT Pro-Wrestling
- Date: May 22, 2022
- City: Tokyo, Japan
- Venue: Korakuen Hall
- Attendance: 529

Audience chronology
← Previous; 2018	Next → —

No.	Results	Stipulations	Times
1	Naomi Yoshimura defeated Yuki Ishida	Singles match	5:45
2	Pheromones (Yuki "Sexy" Iino, Danshoku "Dandy" Dino and Akito) (with Yumehito "Fantastic" Imanari) defeated Disaster Box (Harashima and Toru Owashi) and Antonio Honda	Six-man tag team match	10:52
3	Yuki Ueno defeated Kazuki Hirata	Singles match	9:13
4	Prominence (Suzu Suzuki and Akane Fujita) defeated Super Hardcore Girls (Carousel♥Shun and Elizabeth♥Toi)	Hardcore match	12:18
5	Burning (Tetsuya Endo, Jun Akiyama, Yusuke Okada and Yuya Koroku) defeated Yuji Hino, Yukio Naya, Ilusion and El Unicorn	Eight-man tag team match	14:38
6	Mao and Asuka defeated Calamari Drunken Kings (Chris Brookes and Masahiro Takanashi) (c)	Tag team match for the KO-D Tag Team Championship	14:08
7	Damnation T.A. (Daisuke Sasaki, Kanon and MJ Paul) defeated Eruption (Yukio Sakaguchi, Kazusada Higuchi and Hideki Okatani)	Tournament final for the vacant KO-D 6-Man Tag Team Championship	20:04
(c) / – the champion(s) heading into the match
