= DDT Into The Fight =

Into The Fight
- Promotions: DDT Pro-Wrestling (2005–2020); CyberFight (2021–2024)
- Brands: DDT Pro-Wrestling (2021–2024)
- First event: Into The Fight 2005
- Last event: Into The Fight 2024

Into The Fight (sometimes stylized as Into the Fight) was a recurring professional wrestling event held annually by DDT Pro-Wrestling (DDT) around February. Originally held by DDT as an independent promotion from 2005 to 2020 (except for 2006), it was then held by CyberFight for three editions held as DDT-branded events in 2021, 2023 and 2024. The name "Into The Fight" was a reference to the 1998 Misia song "Into the Light," which was used as DDT's theme until 2014.

== History ==
From 2005 to 2019, Into The Fight was produced by DDT Pro-Wrestling, an independent promotion founded in 1997 by Shintaro Muto and Pro Wrestling Crusaders alumni Kyohei Mikami, Kazushige Nosawa and Sanshiro Takagi. In 2020, DDT and its subsidiaries merged with Pro Wrestling Noah into a new company called CyberFight owned by the digital advertising company CyberAgent, with DDT and Noah persisting as separate brands under the CyberFight umbrella. Into The Fight was then held in 2021, 2023 and 2024 as a DDT-branded event.

== Events ==
#	Event	Date	City	Venue	Main event	Ref.
1	Into The Fight 2005	January 30, 2005	Tokyo, Japan	Korakuen Hall	Mikami (c) vs. Dick Togo for the KO-D Openweight Championship	
2	Into The Fight 2007	February 25, 2007	Tokyo, Japan	Korakuen Hall	Harashima (c) vs. Danshoku Dino for the KO-D Openweight Championship	
3	Into The Fight 2008	February 3, 2008	Tokyo, Japan	Korakuen Hall	Royal Rumble to determine the No. 1 contender for the KO-D Openweight Championship	
4	Into the Fight 2009	February 22, 2009	Tokyo, Japan	Korakuen Hall	Sanshiro Takagi (c) vs. Kota Ibushi for the KO-D Openweight Championship	
5	Into the Fight 2010	February 11, 2010	Tokyo, Japan	Korakuen Hall	Shuji Ishikawa (c) vs. Danshoku Dino for the KO-D Openweight Championship	
6	Into the Fight 2011	February 27, 2011	Tokyo, Japan	Korakuen Hall	Dick Togo (c) vs. Harashima for the KO-D Openweight Championship	
7	Into the Fight 2012	February 19, 2012	Tokyo, Japan	Korakuen Hall	Danshoku Dino (c) vs. Antonio Honda for the KO-D Openweight Championship	
8	Into The Fight 2013	February 17, 2013	Tokyo, Japan	Korakuen Hall	Kenny Omega (c) vs. Harashima for the KO-D Openweight Championship	
9	Into The Fight 2014	February 23, 2014	Tokyo, Japan	Korakuen Hall	Harashima (c) vs. Masa Takanashi for the KO-D Openweight Championship	
10	Into the Fight 2015	February 21, 2015	Tokyo, Japan	Shinjuku Face	Golden☆Storm Riders (Daisuke Sasaki and Kota Ibushi) vs. Happy Motel (Antonio Honda and Konosuke Takeshita)	
11	Into The Fight 2016	February 28, 2016	Tokyo, Japan	Korakuen Hall	Harashima vs. Shigehiro Irie to determine the No. 1 contender for the KO-D Openweight Championship	
12	Into The Fight 2017	February 19, 2017	Tokyo, Japan	Korakuen Hall	Harashima and Kudo vs. Konosuke Takeshita and Dick Togo	
13	Into The Fight 2018	February 25, 2018	Tokyo, Japan	Korakuen Hall	Daisuke Sekimoto and Shuji Ishikawa vs. Harashima and Konosuke Takeshita	
14	Into the Fight 2019	March 21, 2019	Tokyo, Japan	Korakuen Hall	Harashima (c) vs. Muscle Sakai in a two-out-of-three falls hardcore match for the DDT Extreme Championship	
15	Into The Fight 2020	February 23, 2020	Tokyo, Japan	Korakuen Hall	Masato Tanaka (c) vs. Mao for the KO-D Openweight Championship	
16	Into The Fight 2021	February 28, 2021	Tokyo, Japan	Korakuen Hall	Shunma Katsumata (c) vs. Mao in a Kids Room Deathmatch 37 (Sauna) Count Edition for the DDT Extreme Championship	
17	Into The Fight 2023	February 26, 2023	Tokyo, Japan	Korakuen Hall	Harashima vs. Yukio Naya to determine the No. 1 contender for the KO-D Openweight Championship	
18	Into The Fight 2024	February 25, 2024	Tokyo, Japan	Korakuen Hall	The37Kamiina (Shunma Katsumata and Yuki Ueno) and Kaisei Takechi vs. Hideki Okatani, Takeshi Masada and Tetsuya Endo	
(c) – refers to the champion(s) heading into the match

== Results ==
=== 2005 ===
Into The Fight 2005
- Promotion: DDT Pro-Wrestling
- Date: January 30, 2005
- City: Tokyo, Japan
- Venue: Korakuen Hall
- Attendance: 1,800

Event chronology
← Previous; Hatsuyume 2005	Next → Don't Try This at Home 2005

Into The Fight chronology
← Previous —	Next → 2007

No.	Results	Stipulations	Times
1	Nobutaka Moribe defeated Daichi Kakimoto	Singles match	7:36
2	Hero! and Kudo defeated Riki Sensyu and Kenshin	Tag team match	8:23
3	Taka Michinoku defeated Kota Ibushi	Singles match	8:42
4	Sanshiro Takagi and Ryuji Ito defeated Tomohiko Hashimoto and Yoshiya	Hardcore tag team match	14:46
5	MoroToba (Seiya Morohashi and Thanomsak Toba) (c) defeated Shoichi Ichimiya and Yacchan	Real Jungle Fight Ladder match for the KO-D Tag Team Championship	8:42
6	Jako Kyodan (Poison Sawada Julie, Akeomi Nitta, Inokuma Sentoin, Jaiant and Sentoin-ko) defeated Gorgeous Matsuno, Danshoku Dino, Muscle Sakai, Futoshi Miwa and Masa Takanashi (with Cherry) 2–1	Ten-person best two-out-of-three falls match	13:18
7	Dick Togo (c) defeated Mikami	Singles match for the KO-D Openweight Championship	22:15
(c) / – the champion(s) heading into the match

=== 2007 ===
Into The Fight 2007
- Promotion: DDT Pro-Wrestling
- Date: February 25, 2007
- City: Tokyo, Japan
- Venue: Korakuen Hall
- Attendance: 1,390

Event chronology
← Previous; Dramatic Rumble 2007	Next → Judgement 2007

Into The Fight chronology
← Previous; 2005	Next → 2008

No.	Results	Stipulations	Times
1^{D}	Gorgeous Matsuno (with Yusuke Inokuma) vs. Tomomitsu Matsunaga ended in a time limit draw	Singles match	8:00
2	Fruits Army (Mango Fukuja and Durian Sawada Julie) defeated Suicideboyz (Mikami and Thanomsak Toba)	Tag team match	6:56
3	Hoshitango defeated Michael Nakazawa	Singles match	8:56
4	Sanshiro Takagi defeated Yoshiaki Yago (with DJ Nira and Blue K)	Hardcore Locker Room Deathmatch	13:26
5	Toru Owashi and Taru defeated Kudo, Muscle Sakai and Ken Ohka	Three-on-two handicap match	16:49
6	Hawaii Army aWo (King Ala Moana, Prince Togo, Koo and Antonio "The Dragon" Honda) defeated DDT Young Main Unit (Seiya Morohashi, Masa Takanashi, Daichi Kakimoto and Kota Ibushi)	Eight-man tag team match	14:55
7	Harashima (c) defeated Danshoku Dino	Singles match for the KO-D Openweight Championship	20:21
(c) / – the champion(s) heading into the match; D / – this was a dark match

=== 2008 ===
Into The Fight 2008
- Promotion: DDT Pro-Wrestling
- Date: February 3, 2008
- City: Tokyo, Japan
- Venue: Korakuen Hall
- Attendance: 1,194

Event chronology
← Previous; Never Mind 2007	Next → Judgement 2008

Into The Fight chronology
← Previous; 2007	Next → 2009

No.	Results	Stipulations	Times
1	Choun Shiryu and Yukihiro Abe defeated Daisuke Sasaki and Rion Mizuki	Tag team match	9:16
2	Metal Vampires (Toru Owashi and Seiya Morohashi) defeated Koo and Masami Morohashi	Tag team match	12:39
3	Dick Togo defeated Antonio Honda	Singles match	15:02
4	Harashima and Munenori Sawa defeated Yoshihito Sasaki and Daichi Kakimoto	Tag team match	14:27
5	Kota Ibushi (c) defeated Thanomsak Toba	Singles match for the Independent World Junior Heavyweight Championship; As a result, Ibushi also won Toba's Ironman Heavymetalweight Championship.	16:49
6	Yasu Urano won by last eliminating Michael Nakazawa (Note: Order of entrance: Michael Nakazawa, Sanshiro Takagi, Poison Sawada Julie, Tomomitsu Matsunaga, Muscle Sakai, Yasu Urano, Masa Takanashi, Gentaro, Hoshitango, Kudo, Danshoku Dino, and Yoshiaki Yago. Order of elimination: Tomomitsu Matsunaga, Muscle Sakai, Poison Sawada Julie, Hoshitango, Sanshiro Takagi, Yoshiaki Yago, Masa Takanashi, Danshoku Dino, Gentaro, Kudo, and Michael Nakazawa.)	Royal Rumble to determine the No. 1 contender for the KO-D Openweight Championship	31:35
(c) / – the champion(s) heading into the match

=== 2009 ===
Into the Fight 2009
- Promotion: DDT Pro-Wrestling
- Date: February 22, 2009
- City: Tokyo, Japan
- Venue: Korakuen Hall
- Attendance: 1,378

Event chronology
← Previous; Dramatic 2009 Special	Next → Judgement 2009

Into The Fight chronology
← Previous; 2008	Next → 2010

No.	Results	Stipulations	Times
1	Sasaki & Gabbana defeated Keisuke Santa Maria	Singles match	9:13
2	Danshoku Dino [C] defeated Michael Nakazawa and Kayako Nakazawa [C]	Two-on-one handicap Captain's Fall match	8:49
3	Yukihiro Abe won by last eliminating Hoshitango (Note: The other participants were Toru Owashi, Kazuhiro Tamura, Rion Mizuki, and Poison Sawada Julie.)	Six-man battle royal	5:25
4	Jun Kasai defeated Mikami	Hardcore match	10:24
5	Hikaru Sato defeated Yasu Urano, and Thanomsak Toba	Three-way match to determine the No. 1 contender for the KO-D Openweight Championship	10:13
6	Italian Four Horsemen (Francesco Togo, Antonio Honda and Piza Michinoku) (c) defeated French Army (Louis Takanashi XIV, Jacques de Atsushinu and Minoru Polnareff)	Six-man tag team match for the UWA World Trios Championship	14:40
7	Sanshiro Takagi (c) defeated Kota Ibushi	Singles match for the KO-D Openweight Championship	24:44
(c) / – the champion(s) heading into the match

=== 2010 ===
Into the Fight 2010
- Promotion: DDT Pro-Wrestling
- Date: February 11, 2010
- City: Tokyo, Japan
- Venue: Korakuen Hall
- Attendance: 1,455

Event chronology
← Previous; Never Mind 2009	Next → Judgement 2010

Into The Fight chronology
← Previous; 2009	Next → 2011

No.	Results	Stipulations	Times
1	Italian Four Horsemen (Antonio Honda and Sasaki & Gabbana) defeated Gota Ihashi and Soma Takao	Tag team match	11:06
2	Mikami defeated Tomomitsu Matsunaga	Singles match	8:26
3	Michael Nakazawa, Masa Takanashi, Hikaru Sato and Keisuke Ishii defeated Toru Owashi, Hoshitango, Yukihiro Abe and Aika Ando (with Yoshinori Yamamoto, Gorgeous Matsuno and Junko Tashiro) (Note: The match was restarted twice after it originally ended in two successive no contest decisions.)	Eight-person tag team match	0:44
4	Golden☆Lovers (Kota Ibushi and Kenny Omega) defeated Harashima and Kengo Mashimo	Tag team match	8:19
5	Hentai Big Boss (Sanshiro Takagi and Munenori Sawa) defeated Kudo and Yasu Urano (c)	Tag team match for the CMLL KO-D Tag Team Championship	19:34
6	Shuji Ishikawa (c) defeated Danshoku Dino	Singles match for the KO-D Openweight Championship	19:37
(c) / – the champion(s) heading into the match

=== 2011 ===
Into the Fight 2011
- Promotion: DDT Pro-Wrestling
- Date: February 27, 2011
- City: Tokyo, Japan
- Venue: Korakuen Hall
- Attendance: 1,262

Event chronology
← Previous; Sweet Dreams! 2011	Next → Judgement 2011

Into The Fight chronology
← Previous; 2010	Next → 2012

No.	Results	Stipulations	Times
1^{D}	Seiya Morohashi defeated Hoshitango	Singles match	5:14
2	Keisuke Ishii and Akito defeated Mikami and Rion Mizuki	Tag team match	5:27
3	From the Northern Country (Antonio Honda and Daisuke Sasaki) defeated Shit Heart♥Foundation (Michael Nakazawa and Tomomitsu Matsunaga)	Tag team match	12:13
4	Kota Ibushi defeated Shigehiro Irie	Singles match	8:19
5	Danshoku Dino defeated DJ Nira, Thanomsak Toba, Tsuyoshi Kikuchi, and Kazuki Hirata	Scramble Bunkhouse Falls Count Anywhere match for a match at Judgement 2011	13:08
6	Soma Takao defeated Hikaru Sato	Hair vs. Hair no disqualification match	14:13
7	Granma (Gentaro and Yasu Urano) (c) defeated Dan's Club (Kudo and Makoto Oishi)	Tag team match for the CMLL KO-D Tag Team Championship	14:09
8	Dick Togo (c) defeated Harashima	Singles match for the KO-D Openweight Championship	20:43
(c) / – the champion(s) heading into the match; D / – this was a dark match

=== 2012 ===
Into the Fight 2012
- Promotion: DDT Pro-Wrestling
- Date: February 19, 2012
- City: Tokyo, Japan
- Venue: Korakuen Hall
- Attendance: 1,408

Event chronology
← Previous; Sweet Dreams! 2012	Next → Judgement 2012

Into The Fight chronology
← Previous; 2011	Next → 2013

No.	Results	Stipulations	Times
1	SeXXXy Eddy and Keita Yano defeated Shigehiro Irie and DJ Nira	Tag team match	11:56
2	Masa Takanashi, Tsukasa Fujimoto and Yuiga defeated Homoiro Clover Z (Akito, Hiroshi Fukuda and Hikari Minami)	Six-person tag team match	8:11
3	Sanshiro Takagi, Soma Takao, Shiro Koshinaka and Masashi Aoyagi defeated Hiro Saito, Tomo Matsunaga, Kei Ishii and Hoshi Tango	Eight-man tag team match	10:02
4	Strong BJ (Daisuke Sekimoto and Yuji Okabayashi) defeated Do-Hentai-Dan (Hikaru Sato and Michael Nakazawa)	Tag team match	13:02
5	Crying Wolf (Yasu Urano and Yuji Hino) (c) defeated Makoto Oishi and Masao Inoue	Tag team match	16:59
6	El Generico and Harashima defeated Kenny Omega and Kudo	Tag team match	21:19
7	Danshoku Dino (c) defeated Antonio Honda	Singles match for the KO-D Openweight Championship	31:19
(c) / – the champion(s) heading into the match

=== 2013 ===
Into The Fight 2013
- Promotion: DDT Pro-Wrestling
- Date: February 17, 2013
- City: Tokyo, Japan
- Venue: Korakuen Hall
- Attendance: 1,532

Event chronology
← Previous; Sweet Dreams! 2013	Next → Wrestling Tonkotsu! 2013

Into The Fight chronology
← Previous; 2012	Next → 2014

No.	Results	Stipulations	Times
1^{D}	Hiroshi Fukuda defeated DJ Nira	Singles match	6:08
2	Monster Army (Antonio Honda, Daisuke Sasaki, Hoshitango and Yuji Hino) defeated Mikami, Masa Takanashi, Tomomitsu Matsunaga and Tetsuya Endo	Eight-man tag team match	9:23
3	Sanshiro Takagi and Michael Nakazawa defeated Toru Owashi and Ken Ohka (Note: The match was restarted after it originally ended in a 7-second win for Owashi and Ohka.)	Tag team match	6:57
4	Jushin Thunder Liger and Hiromu Takahashi defeated Yukio Sakaguchi and Akito	Tag team match	9:40
5	Team Dream Futures (Keisuke Ishii, Shigehiro Irie and Soma Takao) defeated Golden☆Rendez-Vous (Kota Ibushi and Gota Ihashi) and Yoshihiko	Six-man tag team match	12:18
6	Urashimakudo (Kudo and Yasu Urano) defeated Danshoku Dino and Makoto Oishi	Tag team match	17:17
7	Kenny Omega (c) defeated Harashima	Singles match for the KO-D Openweight Championship	20:24
(c) / – the champion(s) heading into the match; D / – this was a dark match

=== 2014 ===
Into The Fight 2014
- Promotion: DDT Pro-Wrestling
- Date: February 23, 2014
- City: Tokyo, Japan
- Venue: Korakuen Hall
- Attendance: 2,028

Event chronology
← Previous; Sweet Dreams! 2014	Next → Judgement 2015

Into The Fight chronology
← Previous; 2013	Next → 2015

No.	Results	Stipulations	Times
1	Sanshiro Takagi, Toru Owashi and Mikami defeated Monster Army (Antonio Honda, Daisuke Sasaki and Hoshitango)	Six-man tag team match	8:30
2	Daichi Kakimoto won by last eliminating Gota Ihashi (Note: Order of entrance: Daichi Kakimoto, Yasu Urano (c), Gorgeous Matsuno, DJ Nira, Kazuki Hirata, Saki Akai, Emi Sakura, Gota Ihashi, Akito, and Guanchulo. Order of elimination: Gorgeous Matsuno, Kazuki Hirata, Saki Akai, Yasu Urano, Emi Sakura, DJ Nira, Akito, Guanchulo, and Gota Ihashi.)	Ten-person Rumble rules battle royal for the Ironman Heavymetalweight Championship	13:25
3	Happy Motel (Konosuke Takeshita and Tetsuya Endo) defeated Nurunuru Brothers (Michael Nakazawa and Tomomitsu Matsunaga)	Tag team match	10:56
4	Team Dream Futures (Keisuke Ishii, Shigehiro Irie and Soma Takao) defeated Team Homo Sapiens (Danshoku Dino, Makoto Oishi and Aja Kong) (c)	Six-person tag team match for the KO-D 6-Man Tag Team Championship	10:00
5	Kudo defeated Yukio Sakaguchi	Singles match	7:39
6	Golden☆Lovers (Kota Ibushi and Kenny Omega) (c) defeated The Brahman Brothers (Brahman Shu and Brahman Kei)	Tag team match for the KO-D Tag Team Championship	13:42
7	Harashima (c) defeated Masa Takanashi	Singles match for the KO-D Openweight Championship	19:08
(c) / – the champion(s) heading into the match

=== 2015 ===
Into the Fight 2015
- Promotion: DDT Pro-Wrestling
- Date: February 21, 2015
- City: Tokyo, Japan
- Venue: Shinjuku Face
- Attendance: 650

Event chronology
← Previous; Saitama Super DDT 2015	Next → Judgement 2015

Into The Fight chronology
← Previous; 2014	Next → 2016

No.	Results	Stipulations	Times
1^{D}	Suguru Miyatake defeated Gota Ihashi (c)	Singles match for the King of Dark Championship; As a result, Ihashi retained the title.	2:39
2^{D}	Kazusada Higuchi and Shunma Katsumata defeated Kota Umeda and Kouki Iwasaki	Tag team match	6:10
3	Team Dream Futures (Keisuke Ishii, Shigehiro Irie and Soma Takao) and Mikami defeated Shuten Doji (Kudo, Yukio Sakaguchi and Masa Takanashi) and Tomomitsu Matsunaga	Eight-man tag team match	10:35
4	Danshoku Dino and Super Sasadango Machine defeated Toru Owashi and DJ Nira	No disqualification match	9:26
5	Makoto Oishi and Shiori Asahi vs. Smile Squash (Yasu Urano and Akito) ended in a draw	Tag team match	12:50
6	Harashima defeated Kazuki Hirata	Singles match	9:55
7	Tetsuya Endo defeated Yuji Okabayashi	Singles match	17:36
8	Golden☆Storm Riders (Kota Ibushi and Daisuke Sasaki) defeated Happy Motel (Antonio Honda and Konosuke Takeshita)	Tag team match	18:36
(c) / – the champion(s) heading into the match; D / – this was a dark match

=== 2016 ===
The 2016 edition of Into The Fight was held on February 28 at the Korakuen Hall. In the main event, Harashima defeated Shigehiro Irie to become the No. 1 contender for the KO-D Openweight Championship.

=== 2017 ===
The 2017 edition of Into The Fight was held on February 19 at the Korakuen Hall. In the main event, Harashima and Kudo defeated Konosuke Takeshita and Dick Togo in a tag team match.

=== 2018 ===
The 2018 edition of Into The Fight was held on February 25 at the Korakuen Hall. In the main event, Shuji Ishikawa and Daisuke Sekimoto defeated Konosuke Takeshita and Harashima in a tag team match.

=== 2019 ===
The 2019 edition of Into The Fight was held on March 21 at the Korakuen Hall. In the main event, Harashima defeated Muscle Sakai in a two-out-of-three falls hardcore match to retain the DDT Extreme Division Championship.

=== 2020 ===
The 2020 edition of Into The Fight was held on February 23 at the Korakuen Hall. In the main event, Masato Tanaka defeated Mao to retain the KO-D Openweight Championship.

=== 2021 ===
The 2021 edition of Into The Fight was held on February 28 at the Korakuen Hall. In the main event, Shunma Katsumata defeated Mao in a Kids Room Deathmatch 37 (Sauna) Count Edition to retain the DDT Extreme Division Championship.

=== 2023 ===
The 2023 edition of Into The Fight was held on February 26 at the Korakuen Hall. In the main event, Yukio Naya defeated Harashima to become the No. 1 contender for the KO-D Openweight Championship.

=== 2024 ===
The 2024 edition of Into The Fight was held on February 25 at the Korakuen Hall. In the main event, The37Kamiina (Shunma Katsumata and Yuki Ueno) and Kaisei Takechi defeated Hideki Okatani, Takeshi Masada and Tetsuya Endo in a six-man tag team match.
