= Judgement 2016: DDT 19th Anniversary =

2016 DDT Pro-Wrestling event

- Promotional poster for the event, featuring various DDT wrestlers
- Promotion: DDT Pro-Wrestling
- Date: March 21, 2016
- City: Tokyo, Japan
- Venue: Ryōgoku Kokugikan
- Attendance: 6,938

Event chronology
← Previous; Into The Fight 2016	Next → Peter Pan 2016

Judgement chronology
← Previous; 2015	Next → 2017

Judgement 2016: DDT 19th Anniversary (Judgement2016〜DDT旗揚げ19周年記念大会〜, Judgement 2016: hataage 19 shūnen kinen taikai) was a professional wrestling event promoted by DDT Pro-Wrestling (DDT). It took place on March 21, 2016, in Tokyo, Japan, at the Ryōgoku Kokugikan. It was the twentieth event under the Judgement name. The event aired domestically on Fighting TV Samurai.

== Storylines ==
Judgement 2016 featured fourteen professional wrestling matches that involved different wrestlers from pre-existing scripted feuds and storylines. Wrestlers portrayed villains, heroes, or less distinguishable characters in the scripted events that built tension and culminated in a wrestling match or series of matches.

== Event ==
The dark match was a King of Dark Championship tag team match. Per the rules of the championship, had Seiya Morohashi pinned anyone during the match, they would have become the new champion.

The first match of the undercard, was a 13-woman battle royal presented by Tokyo Joshi Pro Wrestling.

Next were two tag matches presented respectively by DDT New Attitude and Basara, two sub-brands of DDT.

On the main card, the first match the "Right To Challenge Anytime, Anywhere Contract Battle Royal", a Rumble rules match for a KO-D Openweight Championship match at Max Bump 2016, on April 24. Four envelopes were suspended above the ring, three of which contained a "Right To Challenge Anytime, Anywhere" contract, giving the right to their holder to challenge any champion at any time in the following year. The last envelope contained a "Right To Date Aja Kong" contract. Grabbing a contract resulted in being eliminated from the match.

Next was a three-way tag team match involving Joey Ryan and Candice LeRae, a real life couple wrestling as the "World's Cutest Tag Team".

Next was a tag match involving LiLiCo, a TV personality who was the reigning Ironman Heavymetalweight Champion going into the match. Since this title is defended under a 24/7 rule, LiLiCo was effectively defending her title during the match.

Next was a match involving the veteran Tatsumi Fujinami.

Next was the "Ultimate Royale Barbed Wire PowerPoint No Power Blast PWF Rules match", in which Kendo Kashin was defending the DDT Extreme Championship against Super Sasadango Machine. Per the rules of the title, Kanshin chose the rules of the match: Sasadango could activate the "Ultimate Royale mode" allowing his masked allies to intervene in the match for a short period of time, Sasadango's personal computer (usually used to give comedic PowerPoint presentation) was sitting at ringside wrapped in barbed wire, disconnected from any power source and was set to explode after five minutes had gone by. PWF rules were used which meant that countouts were 10-counts instead of the more traditional 20-counts used in Japan.

The next match was the "East & West Toward The Front Over The Entire Surface Falls Count Anywhere Weapon Treasure Hunt three-way tag team match", a falls count anywhere weapons match involving Jun Kasai from Pro-Wrestling Freedoms and Kenso from All Japan Pro-Wrestling.

In the next match, Yukio Sakaguchi faced Minoru Suzuki from Pro Wrestling Noah.

Next, Danshoku Dino faced former sumo wrestler Akebono.

== Results ==
No.	Results	Stipulations	Times
1^{D}	DJ Nira and Dai Suzuki defeated Seiya Morohashi (c) and Hoshitango	Tag team match for the King of Dark Championship	03:31
2^{P}	Yuka Sakazaki won by last eliminating Shoko Nakajima (Note: Order of elimination from first eliminated: Poison Miura, Yuu, Hyper Misao, Nodoka-onesan, Rika Tatsumi, Ai Shimizu, Marika Kobashi, Nonoko, Azusa Takigawa, Kanna, Miyu Yamashita and Shoko Nakajima.)	13-woman battle royal	08:37
3^{P}	Shunma Katsumata, Guanchulo and Mao Inoue defeated Kouki Iwasaki, Rainbow Kawamura and Nobuhiro Shimatani	Six-man tag team match	06:53
4^{P}	World Heaviest Heavy Metal Tag (Fuma and Yusuke Kubo) and Sagat defeated Takumi Tsukamoto, Daichi Kazato and Gouma Ryu	Six-man tag team match	05:28
5	Kazusada Higuchi won by last eliminating Soma Takao	KO-D Openweight Title #1 Contendership & Right To Challenge Anytime, Anywhere Contract Battle Royal	16:53
6	Team Dream Futures (Keisuke Ishii and Shigehiro Irie) defeated Smile Squash (Akito and Yasu Urano) and The World's Cutest Tag Team (Joey Ryan and Candice LeRae)	Three-way tag team match	09:57
7	LiLiCo, Kota Umeda and Mizuki Watase defeated Saki Akai, Makoto Oishi and Ladybeard by submission	Six-person tag team match	09:38
8	Tatsumi Fujinami and Leona defeated Antonio Honda and Hiroshi Fukuda	Tag team match	12:10
9	Super Sasadango Machine defeated Kendo Kashin (c)	Ultimate Royale Barbed Wire PowerPoint No Power Blast PWF Rules match for the DDT Extreme Championship	07:07
10	Golden☆Storm Riders (Kota Ibushi and Gota Ihashi) defeated Sanshiro Takagi and Jun Kasai, and Kenso and Michael Nakazawa	East & West Toward The Front Over The Entire Surface Falls Count Anywhere Weapon Treasure Hunt three-way tag team match	23:12
11	Minoru Suzuki defeated Yukio Sakaguchi by technical knockout	Singles match	16:16
12	Akebono defeated Danshoku Dino	Singles match	10:20
13	Daisuke Sasaki and Shuji Ishikawa defeated New Generation Combination (Konosuke Takeshita and Tetsuya Endo) (c)	Tag team match for the KO-D Tag Team Championship	17:22
14	Harashima defeated Isami Kodaka (c)	Singles match for the KO-D Openweight Championship	18:15
(c) / – the champion(s) heading into the match; D / – this was a dark match; P / – the match was broadcast on the pre-show

KO-D Openweight Title #1 Contendership & Right To Challenge Anytime, Anywhere Contract Battle Royal

Order	Name	Order eliminated	By	Time
1	Kazuki Hirata	9	Grabbing a contract (Note: Hirata won the "Right To Date Aja Kong" contract.)	13:19
2	Kazusada Higuchi	—	—	Winner
3	Masa Takanashi	7	Yoshihiko	12:25
4	Ryuichi Sekine	6	Yoshihiko	12:17
5	Cherry	2	Kazuki Hirata	05:23
6	Gorgeous Matsuno	1	Kazusada Higuchi	04:56
7	Ken Ohka	3	Grabbing a contract	06:26
8	Tomomitsu Matsunaga	4	Grabbing a contract	08:27
9	Ryota Nakatsu	10	Kazusada Higuchi	13:46
10	Toru Owashi	5	Grabbing a contract	10:43
11	Soma Takao	11	Kazusada Higuchi	16:53
12	Yoshihiko	8	Kazuki Hirata	12:28
