= Ryōgoku Peter Pan 2017 =

2017 DDT Pro-Wrestling event

- Promotional poster featuring most of the participants
- Promotion: DDT Pro-Wrestling
- Date: August 20, 2017
- City: Tokyo, Japan
- Venue: Ryōgoku Kokugikan
- Attendance: 5,900
- Tagline: Even If Peter Pan Is 20 Years Old He Is Peter Pan

Pay-per-view chronology
← Previous; Judgment 2017	Next → Never Mind 2017

Peter Pan chronology
← Previous; 2016	Next → 2018

Ryōgoku Peter Pan 2017: Peter Pan, Even at Twenty, Is Still Peter Pan (両国ピーターパン2017〜ピーターパン 二十歳になっても ピーターパン〜, Ryōgoku Pītā Pan 2017: Pītā Pan Hatachi ni Natte mo Pītā Pan) was a professional wrestling event promoted by DDT Pro-Wrestling (DDT). The event took place on August 20, 2017, in Tokyo at the Ryōgoku Kokugikan. The event featured seventeen matches, seven of which were contested for championships. The event aired on Fighting TV Samurai and on DDT's video on demand service DDT Universe.

== Storylines ==
The Ryōgoku Peter Pan 2017 event featured seventeen professional wrestling matches that involved different wrestlers from pre-existing scripted feuds and storylines. Wrestlers portrayed villains, heroes, or less distinguishable characters in the scripted events that built tension and culminated in a wrestling match or series of matches.

By winning the King of DDT tournament on June 25, Tetsuya Endo earned a title match in the main event against KO-D Openweight Champion Konosuke Takeshita.

== Event ==
=== Preliminary matches ===
First was the "Gota Ihashi Ryōgoku 5-Match Series", where Gota Ihashi wrestled five Street Fight dark matches against five different opponents. He entered the first match of the series as the reigning King of Dark Champion and defeated Dai Suzuki in less than a minute to lose the title (per the rules of this championship, the title is awarded to the loser of the match). After that, he defeated Gorgeous Matsuno but lost to Mad Paulie, former mixed martial artist Rocky Kawamura and Lingerie Mutoh in quick succession.

The second match of the undercard was a Tokyo Joshi Pro Wrestling Rumble rules match for the Ironman Heavymetalweight Championship. Former NEO Japan Ladies Pro-Wrestling president and CEO Tetsuya Koda was the 1,269th champion entering the match first. He was pinned by Nodoka-Oneesan who became the 1,270th champion. Nodoka was eliminated by Mizuki (1,271st champion) who was then eliminated by Yuu who won the match and became the 1,272nd champion.

On the main card, first was a tag team match that saw the DDT debut of Yuki Iino.

Next was a match for the inaugural KO-D 10-Man Tag Team Championship, a title meant for teams of five wrestlers.

Next was a match pitting Jiro "Ikemen" Kuroshio from Wrestle-1 against Shunma Katsumata. This match was dubbed the "Ikemen vs. Idol! Handsome Battle Without Honor and Humanity" (イケメンvsアイドル！仁義なき男前バトル, ikemen bāsasu aidoru! jingi naki otokomae batoru), a play on the Battles Without Honor and Humanity film series (仁義なき戦い, jingi naki tatakai).

Next was a four-way tag team match that saw the participation of Kaz Hayashi from Wrestle-1. The match was fought under a "no touch" rule meaning that, unlike in a classic tag team four-way match, each team always had a legal man in the ring.

In the next match, Dick Togo, Yasu Urano and Antonio Honda challenged Shuten-dōji (Kudo, Yukio Sakaguchi and Masahiro Takanashi) for the KO-D 6-Man Tag Team Championship.

Next, Danshoku Dino and Sanshiro Takagi faced each other in a "Full Authority vs. Marriage Weapon Rumble" match in which various weapons secretly chosen by the participants beforehand were being introduced one after another at regular intervals. Dino won the bout and, as a result, gained full authority over DDT. Had Takagi won, Dino would have been forced to get married. As part of the "weapons" used in the match, Kendo Kashin and Mitsuo Momota (accompanied by his family) fought in an impromptu Weapon match that quickly ended in a no contest.

Next was a DDT Extreme Championship match between challenger Akito and champion Daisuke Sasaki. Per the rules of the title, the champion chooses the stipulation of the matches. Sasaki decided that this match would be a Hair vs. Hair (here dubbed as Cabellera Contra Cabellera) Hardcore Submission match.

Next, Harashima and Naomichi Marufuji challenged Shigehiro Irie and Kazusada Higuchi for the KO-D Tag Team Championship in a match sponsored by Uchicomi!.

=== Main event ===
In the main event, Tetsuya Endo challenged Konosuke Takeshita for the KO-D Openweight Championship. Takeshita won the bout and was granted a 2,000,000 yen prize by Good Com Asset, the sponsor of the match.

== Results ==
No.	Results	Stipulations	Times
1^{D}	Gota Ihashi (c) defeated Dai Suzuki	Casual Street Pro-Wrestling Extra Edition! match for the King of Dark Championship; First in the best of five series. Ihashi leads 1-0.	0:36
2^{D}	Gota Ihashi defeated Gorgeous Matsuno	Casual Street Pro-Wrestling Extra Edition! match Second in the best of five series. Ihashi leads 2-0.	3:31
3^{D}	Mad Paulie defeated Gota Ihashi	Casual Street Pro-Wrestling Extra Edition! match Third in the best of five series. Ihashi leads 2-1.	4:35
4^{D}	Rocky Kawamura defeated Gota Ihashi	Casual Street Pro-Wrestling Extra Edition! match Fourth in the best of five series. Series tied 2-2.	1:23
5^{D}	Lingerie Mutoh defeated Gota Ihashi	Casual Street Pro-Wrestling Extra Edition! match Last in the best of five series. Ihashi loses 2-3.	1:36
6^{P}	Mizuki Watase, Rekka, Diego and Daiki Shimomura defeated Tomomitsu Matsunaga, Hoshitango, Nobuhiro Shimatani and Masato Kamino	Eight-man tag team match	6:23
7^{P}	Yuu won by last eliminating Mizuki	Rumble rules match for the Ironman Heavymetalweight Championship	16:46
8	Naomi Yoshimura and Yuki Ueno defeated Kouki Iwasaki and Yuki Iino	Tag team match	10:49
9	Makoto Oishi, LiLiCo, Ladybeard, Super Sasadango Machine and Ken Ohka defeated Toru Owashi, Kazuki Hirata, Joey Ryan, Saki Akai and Yoshihiko	Ten-man tag team match for the inaugural KO-D 10-Man Tag Team Championship	10:23
10	Jiro "Ikemen" Kuroshio defeated Shunma Katsumata (with Makoto Oishi)	Singles match	12:00
11	Kotaro Suzuki and Soma Takao defeated Kaz Hayashi and Keisuke Ishii, Mike Bailey and Mao and Yankī Nichōkenjū (Isami Kodaka and Yuko Miyamoto)	Four-way tag team "No Touch" rule match	10:30
12	Shuten-dōji (Kudo, Yukio Sakaguchi and Masahiro Takanashi) (c) defeated Dick Togo, Yasu Urano and Antonio Honda	Six-man tag team match for the KO-D 6-Man Tag Team Championship	13:52
13	Danshoku Dino defeated Sanshiro Takagi	Full Authority vs. Marriage Weapon Rumble; As a result, Dino gained full authority over DDT. Had he lost, he would have had to get married.	17:16
14	Kendo Kashin vs. Mitsuo Momota (with Momota's family) ended in a no contest	Weapon match (Note: This match took place as part of the Dino vs. Takagi match.)	2:36
15	Daisuke Sasaki (c) defeated Akito by submission	Cabellera Contra Cabellera Hardcore Submission match for the DDT Extreme Championship	21:14
16	HarashiMarufuji (Harashima and Naomichi Marufuji) defeated YaroZ (Shigehiro Irie and Kazusada Higuchi) (c)	Tag team match for the KO-D Tag Team Championship	16:14
17	Konosuke Takeshita (c) defeated Tetsuya Endo	Singles match for the KO-D Openweight Championship	29:02
(c) / – the champion(s) heading into the match; D / – this was a dark match; P / – the match was broadcast on the pre-show

=== Rumble rules match ===
Order	Wrestler	Order eliminated	By	Time
1	Tetsuya Koda (c)	2	Nodoka-Oneesan (Note: Nodoka-Oneesan becomes the 1,270th champion.)	4:52
2	Cherry	1	Nodoka-Oneesan and Nonoko	3:17
3	Nodoka-Oneesan	5	Mizuki (Note: Mizuki becomes the 1,271st champion.)	6:47
4	Nonoko	3	Yuka Sakazaki	5:01
5	Yuna Manase	4	Yuka Sakazaki	5:01
6	Yuka Sakazaki	10	Mizuki	13:28
7	Mizuki	13	Yuu	16:46
8	Maho Kurone	7	Rika Tatsumi	10:43
9	Marika Kobashi	6	Maho Kurone	10:04
10	Rika Tatsumi	8	Yuka Sakazaki and Shoko Nakajima	11:40
11	Shoko Nakajima	11	Mizuki	13:28
12	Miyu Yamashita	9	Yuu	13:04
13	Yuu	—	—	Winner
14	Azusa Takigawa	12	Yuu	14:53
