= Into The Fight 2017 =

2017 DDT Pro-Wrestling event

- Promotional poster featuring Kudo, Harashima, Konosuke Takeshita and Dick Togo
- Promotion: DDT Pro-Wrestling
- Date: February 19, 2017
- City: Tokyo, Japan
- Venue: Korakuen Hall
- Attendance: 1,280

Event chronology
| ← Previous; Peter Pan 2016 | Next → Judgment 2017 |

Into The Fight chronology
| ← Previous; 2016 | Next → 2018 |

Into The Fight 2017 was a professional wrestling event promoted by DDT Pro-Wrestling (DDT). It took place on February 19, 2017, in Tokyo, Japan, at the Korakuen Hall. The event aired domestically on Fighting TV Samurai.

== Storylines ==
Into The Fight 2017 featured eight professional wrestling matches involving wrestlers from pre-existing scripted feuds and storylines. Wrestlers portrayed villains, heroes, or less distinguishable characters in the scripted events that built tension and culminated in a wrestling match or series of matches.

== Event ==
During the event, Nobuhiro Shimatani defeated Gota Ihashi in a King of Dark Championship dark match. Contrary to regular professional wrestling titles, this one is awarded to the loser of the match who is then forced to wrestle in dark matches. Having lost the bout, Ihashi was declared the new champion.

The team of Sanshiro Takagi, Toru Owashi, Kazuki Hirata and Saki Akai defeated Michael Nakazawa, Masahiro Takanashi, Tomomitsu Matsunaga and Cherry in a Loser Exiled Overseas match, thus forcing Nakazawa to leave Japan.

Next was a three-way match for the Ironman Heavymetalweight Championship. The champion going into the match was a kotatsu table in its second reign as champion after having accidentally pinned the former champion Hyota Echizenya during a brawl caused by Dai Suzuki and Gota Ihashi. During the match, Antonio Honda was defeated when he swung the kotatsu table into the ropes and it bounced back landing on top of him for the pinfall.

The next match saw the participation of Yoshihiro Takayama.

== Results ==
| No. | Results | Stipulations | Times |
|---|---|---|---|
| 1^{D} | Nobuhiro Shimatani (c) defeated Gota Ihashi | Singles match for the King of Dark Championship | 05:01 |
| 2 | Smile Squash (Akito, Soma Takao and Yasu Urano) defeated NωA (Makoto Oishi, Mao and Shunma Katsumata) and Guanchulo, Kouki Iwasaki and Mizuki Watase | Three-way match | 08:07 |
| 3 | T2Hii (Sanshiro Takagi, Toru Owashi and Kazuki Hirata) and Saki Akai defeated Michael Nakazawa, Masahiro Takanashi, Tomomitsu Matsunaga and Cherry | Loser Exiled Overseas eight-person tag team match | 10:08 |
| 4 | Kotatsu (c) defeated Keisuke Ishii and Antonio Honda | Three-way match for the Ironman Heavymetalweight Championship | 09:01 |
| 5 | Yoshihiro Takayama and Kazusada Higuchi defeated Damnation (Daisuke Sasaki and Mad Paulie) | Tag team match | 10:04 |
| 6 | Danshoku "Bin Bin" Dino vs. Colt "Boom Boom" Cabana ended in a no contest | Singles match | 09:23 |
| 7 | Tetsuya Endo defeated Yukio Sakaguchi | Singles match | 12:39 |
| 8 | Harashima and Kudo defeated Konosuke Takeshita and Dick Togo | Tag team match | 20:54 |
(c) / – the champion(s) heading into the match; D / – this was a dark match
