= Ryōgoku Peter Pan 2016 =

2016 DDT Pro-Wrestling event

- Promotional poster for the event featuring various wrestlers
- Promotion: DDT Pro-Wrestling
- Date: August 28, 2016
- City: Tokyo, Japan
- Venue: Ryōgoku Kokugikan
- Attendance: 5,394
- Tagline: Let's Watch Pro-Wrestling and Be Happy. (Note: Japanese: プロレスを見て、幸せになろう。, Hepburn: Puroresu o mite, shiawase ni narō)

Pay-per-view chronology
← Previous; Judgment 2016	Next → Into The Fight 2017

Peter Pan chronology
← Previous; 2015	Next → 2017

Ryōgoku Peter Pan 2016: World's Hottest Summer (両国ピーターパン2016〜世界でいちばん熱い夏〜, Ryōgoku Pītā Pan 2016: Sekai de Ichiban Atsui Natsu) was a professional wrestling event promoted by DDT Pro-Wrestling (DDT). The event took place on August 28, 2016, in Tokyo at the Ryōgoku Kokugikan. The event featured twelve matches, six of which were contested for championships. The event aired on Fighting TV Samurai.

Terry Funk was originally scheduled to appear at the event but was forced to cancel due to an abdominal hernia.

== Storylines ==
The Ryōgoku Peter Pan 2016 event featured twelve professional wrestling matches that involved different wrestlers from pre-existing scripted feuds and storylines. Wrestlers portrayed villains, heroes, or less distinguishable characters in the scripted events that built tension and culminated in a wrestling match or series of matches.

On September 14, 2015, Kudo suffered an anterior cruciate ligament injury while taking part in Pro Wrestling Noah's 2015 NTV G+ Cup Junior Heavyweight Tag League. On September 17, he announced that the injury required surgery, which would sideline him for about a year. After eleven months, DDT announced that Kudo would make his return at Ryōgoku Peter Pan 2016.

By winning the King of DDT tournament on June 26, Shuji Ishikawa earned a title match in the main event against KO-D Openweight Champion Konosuke Takeshita.

== Event ==
The dark match was a King of Dark Championship six-man tag team match. Chikara was the reigning champion going into the match. Per its special rules, this title is awarded to the loser of the match. In the case of a tag match, whoever gets pinned by the champion becomes the new champion.

The next match was a Tokyo Joshi Pro Wrestling exhibition match featuring six TJPW wrestlers.

On the main card, the next match, dubbed "DNA Fights: Battle of Last Summer", was an exhibition match from DDT New Attitude (DNA), DDT's developmental brand.

At 2:23 pm, between the third and fourth matches, a yakitori pinned Toru Owashi to become the 1,163rd Ironman Heavymetalweight Champion.

Next was a Rumble rules match for the Ironman Heavymetalweight Championship. Amongst the participants was Jun Kasai from the hardcore promotion Pro-Wrestling Freedoms. The champion yakitori entered first but was eaten by Cherry (the third entrant) who was then declared the 1,164th champion. Keisuke Ishii (the seventh entrant) forced Cherry to submit with a single leg crab to eliminate her from the match and become the 1,165th champion. A few minutes later, Yoshihiko (an inflatable love doll which was the last entrant) eliminated Ishii with a rear naked choke, forcing him to submit and becoming the 1,166th champion. Seconds later, Toru Owashi pinned Kazuki Hirata and Yoshihiko at the same time with La Magistral to win the match and become the 1,167th champion. After the match, Joey Ryan pinned Owashi by surprise to become the 1,168th champion.

Next was a tag team match, dubbed "Yellow Dragon Comes Back!!" which saw the return of Kudo after being absent for almost a year due to an injury.

The next match, an eight-man tag team match, was dubbed "The NωA's Road To Participating In The 2016 DDT Festival" and featured Super Sasadango Machine acting as the NωA General Manager and giving a Powerpoint presentation entitled "Sasadango Teaches The Way To Survive In The Show Business Industry".

Next, Soma Takao challenged Hikaru Sato for the World Junior Heavyweight Championship, All Japan Pro-Wrestling's top junior heavyweight title.

Next, Danshoku Dino challenged LiLiCo for the DDT Extreme Championship in a "Watase Contra Watase" match where Mizuki Watase was free to intervene in the match and where the loser would be forbidden to meet with Watase ever again.

Then, at 4:56 pm, Joey Ryan lost the Ironman Heavymetalweight Championship to a yakitori by choking on it when a referee counted this as a submission and declared the yakitori the 1,169th champion.

Next was a six-man tag team match that saw the participation of Nosawa, Shiro Koshinaka and The Great Kabuki.

Next was a tag team match that saw the participation of Dick Togo.

Next, Harashima and Yuko Miyamoto challenged Kai from Wrestle-1 and Ken Ohka for the KO-D Tag Team Championship in a match sponsored by Uchicomi!.

In the main event, Shuji Ishikawa challenged Konosuke Takeshita for the KO-D Openweight Championship. Ishikawa won the bout and was granted a 2,000,000 yen prize by Good Com Asset, the sponsor of the match.

After the match, Ryota Yamasato ate the champion yakitori to become the 1,170th Ironman Heavymetalweight champion.

== Results ==
No.	Results	Stipulations	Times
1^{D}	Tomomitsu Matsunaga, Hoshitango and Rekka defeated Chikara (c), Mitsuo Momota and Nobuhiro Shimatani	Six-man tag team match for the King of Dark Championship; Had any opponent got pinned by Chikara, they would have become the new champion.	7:05
2^{P}	Miyu Yamashita, Yuka Sakazaki and Akane Miura defeated Shoko Nakajima, Hyper Misao and Yuu	Six-woman tag team match	8:56
3	Kazusada Higuchi and Daiki Shimomura defeated Kouki Iwasaki and Mizuki Watase	Tag team match	6:56
4	Toru Owashi won by last eliminating Yoshihiko	Rumble rules match for the Ironman Heavymetalweight Championship	17:32
5	Shuten-dōji (Kudo and Masahiro Takanashi) defeated Smile Squash (Akito and Yasu Urano)	Tag team match	10:51
6	NωA (Makoto Oishi, Shunma Katsumata and Mao) and Super Sasadango Machine defeated Happy Motel (Antonio Honda and Trans-Am★Hiroshi), Ladybeard and Gorgeous Matsuno	Eight-man tag team match	13:09
7	Soma Takao defeated Hikaru Sato (c)	Singles match for the World Junior Heavyweight Championship	17:07
8	Danshoku Dino defeated LiLiCo (c)	Singles match for the DDT Extreme Championship with Mizuki Watase being able to freely intervene in the match Since LiLiCo lost, she will never meet with Mizuki Watase in the future.	10:07
9	Sanshiro Takagi, Shiro Koshinaka and Nosawa defeated The Great Kabuki, Yukio Sakaguchi and Kota Umeda	Six-man tag team match	11:23
10	Damnation (Daisuke Sasaki and Tetsuya Endo) defeated Dick Togo and Mike Bailey	Tag team match	21:53
11	Smile Yankees (Harashima and Yuko Miyamoto) defeated Bad Comis (Ken Ohka and Kai) (c)	Tag team match for the KO-D Tag Team Championship	13:37
12	Shuji Ishikawa defeated Konosuke Takeshita (c)	Singles match for the KO-D Openweight Championship	20:05
(c) / – the champion(s) heading into the match; D / – this was a dark match; P / – the match was broadcast on the pre-show

=== Rumble rules match ===
Order	Wrestler	Order eliminated	By	Time
1	Yakitori (c)	1	Cherry (Note: Cherry becomes the 1,164th champion.)	4:03
2	Kazuki Hirata	12	Toru Owashi	17:32
3	Cherry	2	Keisuke Ishii (Note: Ishii becomes the 1,165th champion.)	6:13
4	Joey Ryan	4	Mad Paulie	9:29
5	Guanchulo	8	Kazuki Hirata	16:27
6	Reika Saiki	3	Gota Ihashi	7:50
7	Keisuke Ishii	7	Yoshihiko (Note: Yoshihiko becomes the 1,166th champion.)	14:43
8	Saki Akai	9	Jun Kasai	16:29
9	Gota Ihashi	5	Mad Paulie	9:57
10	Mad Paulie	10	Kazuki Hirata	16:32
11	Toru Owashi	—	—	Winner
12	Kenso	6	Yoshihiko	14:06
13	Jun Kasai	11	Yoshihiko	17:10
14	Yoshihiko	13	Toru Owashi	17:32
