= Judgement 2017: DDT 20th Anniversary =

2017 DDT Pro-Wrestling event

- Promotional poster for the event, featuring various DDT wrestlers
- Promotion: DDT Pro-Wrestling
- Date: March 20, 2017
- City: Saitama, Japan
- Venue: Saitama Super Arena
- Attendance: 10,702

Event chronology
← Previous; Into The Fight 2017	Next → Peter Pan 2017

Judgement chronology
← Previous; 2016	Next → 2018

Judgement 2017: DDT 20th Anniversary (Judgement2017〜DDT旗揚げ20周年記念大会〜, Judgement 2017: hataage 20 shūnen kinen taikai) was a professional wrestling event promoted by DDT Pro-Wrestling (DDT). It took place on March 20, 2017, in Saitama, Japan, at the Saitama Super Arena. It was the twenty-first event under the Judgement name and the first Judgement event held outside of Tokyo. The event aired domestically on Fighting TV Samurai.

== Storylines ==
Judgement 2017 featured thirteen professional wrestling matches that involved different wrestlers from pre-existing scripted feuds and storylines. Wrestlers portrayed villains, heroes, or less distinguishable characters in the scripted events that built tension and culminated in a wrestling match or series of matches.

== Event ==
The two matches on the undercard were presented respectively by DDT New Attitude and Tokyo Joshi Pro Wrestling, two sub-brands of DDT.

The dark match was a Rumble rules match for both the Ironman Heavymetalweight Championship and the King of Dark Championship, respectively held by Gota Ihashi and a kotatsu table. During the match, Gota Ihashi was eliminated by Mad Paulie, causing Ihashi to retain his title (unlike regular championships, the King of Dark Championship is awarded to the loser of the match). Following a punch by Munenori Sawa, Guanchulo fell on the kotatsu table, scoring a pinfall to become the 1,209th Ironman Heavymetalweight Champion.

After the match, Yoshihiko, a blow-up doll with male make-up, hit Guanchulo with a Superfly Splash and pinned him to become the 1,210th champion.

Next, Team DNA (Kazusada Higuchi, Kouki Iwasaki and Mizuki Watase) unsuccessfully defended the KO-D 6-Man Tag Team Championship against Smile Squash (Soma Takao, Akito and Yasu Urano) and NωA (Makoto Oishi, Shunma Katsumata and Mao), the eventual winners of the bout.

Next was an eight-man tag team match featuring veteran joshi wrestler Jaguar Yokota from the World Women Pro-Wrestling Diana promotion.

After the match, the kotatsu table pinned Yoshihiko to win back the Ironman Heavymetalweight title but was then pinned by Joey Ryan who became the 1,212th champion.

The next match saw the return of Shigehiro Irie and was dubbed "Shigehiro Irie's Triumphal Return Special Singles Match".

Next was a match dubbed "Super Joshi Pro War 2017" that saw the participation of Meiko Satomura from Sendai Girls' Pro Wrestling and Aja Kong from Oz Academy.

The next match was the "Shungo Oyama Pro-Wrestling Challenge" that saw the professional wrestling debut of mixed martial artist Shungo Oyama in a tag team match.

Next was a singles match for the Ironman Heavymetalweight Championship dubbed "Pro Wrestling Tees Presents “DDT Is DDT” 20 Years Entertainment Culmination! The Best In The World Bad Guy Decisive Battle Anal Explosion Deathmatch" between champion Joey Ryan and challenger Danshoku Dino.

Next Yukio Sakaguchi and veteran Masakatsu Funaki defended the KO-D Tag Team Championship against Tetsuya Endo and Shuji Ishikawa representing the Damnation stable.

Next was a match dubbed "Kou Shibusawa's 35th Anniversary - “Nobunaga's Ambition: Our Warring States” Sengoku Warlords Match" celebrating the 35-year career of Kou Shibusawa, creator of many Koei video games such as Nobunaga's Ambition or Romance of the Three Kingdoms. Each participant was dressed as a historical figure of the Sengoku period: in the first team were Sanshiro Takagi as Toyotomi Hideyoshi, Keiji Mutoh as Takeda Shingen and Isami Kodaka as Sanada Yukimura; in the second team were Daisuke Sekimoto as Shibata Katsuie, Jun Akiyama as Uesugi Kenshin and Kota Ibushi as Oda Nobunaga.

== Results ==
No.	Results	Stipulations	Times
1^{P}	Nobuhiro Shimatani, Naomi Yoshimura and Dai Suzuki defeated Rekka, Daiki Shimomura and Yuki Ueno	Six-man tag team match	08:08
2^{P}	Yuu, Mil Clown and Maki Itoh defeated Reika Saiki, Rika Tatsumi and Azusa Takigawa	Six-woman tag team match	10:23
3^{D}	Guanchulo won by last eliminating Munenori Sawa	Rumble rules match for the Ironman Heavymetalweight Championship and the King of Dark Championship	17:06
4	NωA (Makoto Oishi, Shunma Katsumata and Mao) defeated Smile Squash (Soma Takao, Akito and Yasu Urano) and Team DNA (Kazusada Higuchi, Kouki Iwasaki and Mizuki Watase) (c)	Three-way match for the KO-D 6-Man Tag Team Championship	08:11
5	Jaguar Yokota, Keisuke Ishii, Masahiro Takanashi and Yuni defeated Toru Owashi, Kazuki Hirata, Antonio Honda and Ladybeard	Eight-person tag team match	10:09
6	Shigehiro Irie defeated Mike Bailey by submission	Singles match	08:44
7	Saki Akai, Meiko Satomura and Shoko Nakajima defeated Aja Kong, Cherry and Miyu Yamashita	Six-woman tag team match	07:56
8	Yoshihiro Takayama and Dick Togo defeated Kudo and Shungo Oyama	Tag team match	13:15
9	Danshoku Dino defeated Joey Ryan (c)	Anal Explosion Deathmatch for the Ironman Heavymetalweight Championship	12:03
10	Masakatsu Funaki and Yukio Sakaguchi (c) defeated Damnation (Shuji Ishikawa and Tetsuya Endo)	Tag team match for the KO-D Tag Team Championship	12:16
11	Daisuke Sekimoto, Jun Akiyama and Kota Ibushi (with Mai Iriya) defeated Sanshiro Takagi, Keiji Mutoh and Isami Kodaka (with Kimika Tokuta)	Six-man tag team match	14:57
12	Daisuke Sasaki defeated Jun Kasai (c)	Hardcore match for the DDT Extreme Championship	19:07
13	Konosuke Takeshita defeated Harashima (c)	Singles match for the KO-D Openweight Championship	31:28
(c) / – the champion(s) heading into the match; P / – the match was broadcast on the pre-show; D / – this was a dark match

=== Rumble rules match ===
Order	Name	Order eliminated	By	Time
1	Mikami	5	Poison Sawada Julie	05:35
2	Gentaro	3	Poison Sawada Julie	05:27
3	Rion Mizuki	1	Tomohiko Hashimoto	03:56
4	Daichi Kakimoto	2	Poison Sawada Julie	05:17
5	Tomohiko Hashimoto	6	Poison Sawada Julie	05:53
6	Bambi	4	Poison Sawada Julie	05:27
7	Poison Sawada Julie	7	Gorgeous Matsuno	06:45
8	Gorgeous Matsuno	10	Yoshihiko	11:27
9	Trans-Am★Hiroshi	13	Kotatsu	14:37
10	Tomomitsu Matsunaga	8	Yoshihiko	11:21
11	Hoshitango	9	Yoshihiko	11:23
12	Guanchulo	—	—	Winner
13	Yoshihiko	11	Trans-Am★Hiroshi	12:20
14	Gota Ihashi (Dark/c)	12	Mad Paulie (Note: Ihashi retains the King of Dark Championship.)	13:30
15	Mad Paulie	14	Kotatsu	14:37
16	Kotatsu (Note: A kotatsu table.) (Ironman/c)	15	Guanchulo (Note: Guanchulo becomes the 1,209th Ironman Heavymetalweight Champion.)	15:08
17	Munenori Sawa	17	Guanchulo	17:06
18	Ken Ohka	16	Guanchulo	17:06
