= Kota Umeda =

Japanese professional wrestler

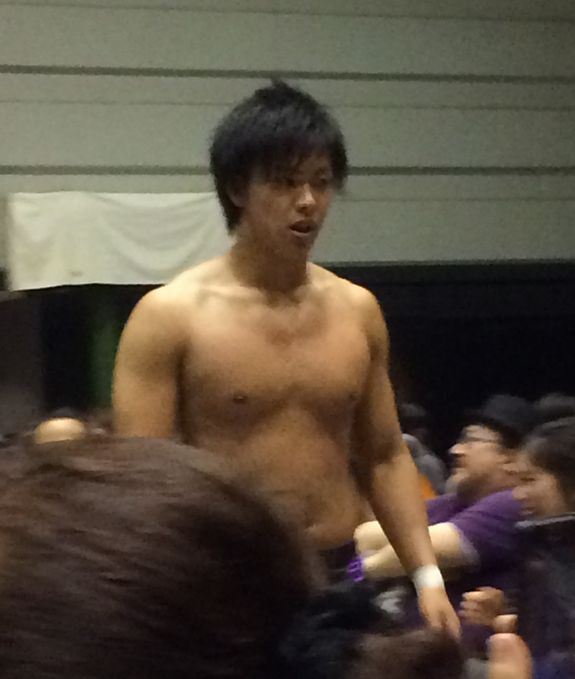
- Umeda in June 2015

Personal information
- Born: May 5, 1995 (age 31) Kumamoto, Japan

Professional wrestling career
- Ring name: Kota Umeda
- Billed height: 175 cm (5 ft 9 in)
- Billed weight: 80 kg (176 lb)
- Trained by: Kenichi Yamamoto
- Debut: 2014

Kota Umeda (梅田公太, Umeda Kōta) is a Japanese professional wrestler best known for his time with the Japanese promotion DDT Pro-Wrestling where he is a former KO-D 6-Man Tag Team Champion.

== Professional wrestling career ==
=== Independent circuit (2014–present) ===
Umeda is known for seldomly competing for various promotions from the Japanese independent scene. He competed in the 2015 edition of Pro Wrestling Noah's Global Junior Heavyweight Tag League where he teamed up with Kudo and scored a total of two points after going against the teams of El Desperado and Taka Michinoku, Yoshinari Ogawa and Zack Sabre Jr., Masamune and Taiji Ishimori, and Captain Noah and Genba Hirayanagi. On the first night of the AJPW Super Power Series 2015, from May 6, Umeda teamed up with Keisuke Ishii to defeat Xceed (Kotaro Suzuki and Yohei Nakajima).

=== DDT Pro-Wrestling (2014–2019) ===
Umeda made his professional wrestling debut in DDT Pro-Wrestling on October 18, 2014, at DDT Dramatic Fanclub Vol. 1, where he fell short to Kazusada Higuchi.

He is known for competing in various of the promotion's signature events such as the DDT Peter Pan, making his first appearance at Ryōgoku Peter Pan 2015 on August 23, where he teamed up with Mao Inoue and Mizuki Watase in a losing effort against Yasu Urano, Akito and Ryota Nakatsu as a result of a Six-man tag team match. At Ryōgoku Peter Pan 2016 on August 28, he teamed up with The Great Kabuki and Yukio Sakaguchi in a losing effort against Sanshiro Takagi, Shiro Koshinaka and Nosawa. At Ryōgoku Peter Pan 2018 on October 21, he teamed up with Kazusada Higuchi and competed in a Gauntlet tag team match won by Shuten-dōji (Kudo and Masahiro Takanashi) and also involving Mike Bailey and Antonio Honda, Renegades (Mizuki Watase and Jason "The Gift" Kincaid), Thanomsak Toba and Keisuke Okuda, and Tomomitsu Matsunaga and Michael Nakazawa. At Wrestle Peter Pan 2019 on July 15, Umeda competed twice, first in a Singles match where he defeated Keigo Nakamura, and secondly in a tag team match where he paired up with Kouki Iwasaki in a losing effort against Kazusada Higuchi and Ryota Nakatsu. At Wrestle Peter Pan 2022 on August 20, he teamed up with Naomi Yoshimura and Keisuke Okuda in a losing effort against Harashima and Eruption (Yukio Sakaguchi and Hideki Okatani).

Another branch of events in which Umeda competed is DDT Judgement, in which he made his first appearance at Judgement 2016: DDT 19th Anniversary on March 21, where he teamed up with LiLiCo and Mizuki Watase to defeat Saki Akai, Makoto Oishi and Ladybeard. At Judgement 2018: DDT 21st Anniversary, he teamed up with Yuki Ueno and Koju Takeda and defeated Shuten-dōji (Kudo, Masahiro Takanashi and Yukio Sakaguchi) to win the KO-D 6-Man Tag Team Championship. At Judgement 2019: DDT 22nd Anniversary on February 17, he teamed up with Keisuke Ishii and Mizuki Watase to defeat Danshoku Dino, Pokotan and Kudo.

As for the DDT Into The Fight series, he made his first appearance at Into The Fight 2016 on February 28, where he teamed up with Mizuki Watase to defeat Hiroshi Fukuda and Guanchulo in a match disputed for the King of Dark Championship. At Into The Fight 2018 on February 25, Umeda teamed up with Makoto Oishi and competed in a Tag team rumble rules match won by Soma Takao and Mao and also involving Yuki Ueno and Koju Takeda, T2Hii (Toru Owashi and Kazuki Hirata), and Sanshiro Takagi and Super Sasadango Machine. At Into The Fight 2019 on March 21, he teamed up with Bull James and Naomi Yoshimura to defeat Damnation (Tetsuya Endo, Mad Paulie and Nobuhiro Shimatani).

In the King of DDT Tournament, Umeda made his first appearance at the 2015 edition where he fell short to Daisuke Sasaki in the first rounds. At the 2016 edition, he fell short to Shuji Ishikawa in the first rounds. At the 2019 edition, Umeda fell short to Kazusada Higuchi again just in the first rounds.

== Championships and accomplishments ==
- DDT Pro-Wrestling
  - KO-D 6-Man Tag Team Championship (1 time) – with Koju Takeda and Yuki Ueno
  - Maji Manji Tournament (2018)
- Kyushu Pro-Wrestling
  - Kyushu Pro Tag Team Championship (1 time) – with Hitamaru Sasaki
