= Ryōgoku Peter Pan 2015 =

2015 DDT Pro-Wrestling event

- Promotional poster featuring various participants
- Promotion: DDT Pro-Wrestling
- Date: August 23, 2015
- City: Tokyo, Japan
- Venue: Ryōgoku Kokugikan
- Attendance: 6,670
- Tagline: From DDT With Love

Peter Pan chronology
← Previous; 2014	Next → 2016

Ryōgoku Peter Pan 2015: From DDT With Love (両国ピーターパン2015〜DDTより愛をこめて〜, Ryōgoku Pītā Pan 2015: DDT yori ai o komete) was a professional wrestling event promoted by DDT Pro-Wrestling (DDT). The event took place on August 23, 2015, in Tokyo at the Ryōgoku Kokugikan. The event featured ten matches, five of which were contested for championships. The event aired live on Fighting TV Samurai and later on TV Tokyo, on October 18.

== Storylines ==
The Ryōgoku Peter Pan 2015 event featured ten professional wrestling matches that involved different wrestlers from pre-existing scripted feuds and storylines. Wrestlers portrayed villains, heroes, or less distinguishable characters in the scripted events that built tension and culminated in a wrestling match or series of matches.

On February 7, 2015, it was reported that Genichiro Tenryu had decided to retire from professional wrestling with his final match scheduled to take place later in the year. In the meantime, he embarked on a multipromotional "Retirement Road" tour that would make a stop at Ryōgoku Peter Pan 2015.

By winning the King of DDT tournament on June 28, Yukio Sakaguchi earned a title match in the main event against KO-D Openweight Champion Kudo.

== Event ==
The dark match was a King of Dark Championship match between "Hollywood" Stalker Ichikawa from Dragon Gate and Gota Ihashi. Per the rules of the championship, losing the match caused Ihashi to retain the title.

On the main card, the second match of the evening was the debut match of Mao Inoue and Mizuki Watase.

The next match was a Rumble rules match in which tag teams competed by entering the match one after another at regular intervals. Amongst the participants were Great Kojika from Big Japan Pro Wrestling who teamed up with Gorgeous Matsuno, and Aja Kong from Oz Academy who teamed up with Makoto Oishi. The match also saw the professional wrestling debut of LiLiCo, a comedian and TV personality who had already taken part in several DDT events in previous years.

The next match was a "Blindfold Bra Stripping Tiger Trap Deathmatch" sponsored by Uchicomi! in which Antonio Honda defended the DDT Extreme Championship against Masa Takanashi. In this match, both participants were blindfolded, wore a bra and a giant tiger trap was set up in the middle of the ring. There were no pinfalls or submissions and the winner would be the first to completely remove their opponent's bra.

In the next match Tetsuya Endo made his return after suffering a leg injury in April.

The next match was the sixteenth match of the "Genichiro Tenryu Retirement Road" tour that saw the participation of Meiko Satomura from Sendai Girls' Pro Wrestling.

The eighth match saw Strong BJ (Daisuke Sekimoto and Yuji Okabayashi) from Big Japan Pro Wrestling defend the KO-D Tag Team Championship against the Golden☆Storm Riders (Kota Ibushi and Daisuke Sasaki).

In the next match, Harashima faced Hiroshi Tanahashi from New Japan Pro-Wrestling.

== Results ==
No.	Results	Stipulations	Times
1^{D}	"Hollywood" Stalker Ichikawa defeated Gota Ihashi (c)	Singles match for the King of Dark Championship	5:15
2	Yasu Urano, Akito and Ryota Nakatsu defeated Kota Umeda, Mao Inoue and Mizuki Watase by submission	Six-man tag team match	10:07
3	Aja Kong and Makoto Oishi won by last eliminating LiLiCo and Suguru Miyatake	Rumble rules match	16:41
4	Antonio Honda (c) defeated Masa Takanashi	Blindfold Bra Stripping Tiger Trap Deathmatch for the DDT Extreme Championship	15:10
5	Konosuke Takeshita defeated Tetsuya Endo	Singles match	13:32
6	Genichiro Tenryu, Sanshiro Takagi and Saki Akai defeated Shuji Ishikawa, Kazusada Higuchi and Meiko Satomura	Six-man tag team match	13:09
7	Team Dream Futures (Keisuke Ishii, Shigehiro Irie and Soma Takao) (c) defeated #OhkaEmpire (Danshoku Dino, Super Sasadango Machine and Ken Ohka)	Six-man tag team match for the KO-D 6-Man Tag Team Championship	12:35
8	Golden☆Storm Riders (Kota Ibushi and Daisuke Sasaki) defeated Strong BJ (Daisuke Sekimoto and Yuji Okabayashi) (c)	Tag team match for the KO-D Tag Team Championship	21:33
9	Hiroshi Tanahashi defeated Harashima	Singles match	19:00
10	Yukio Sakaguchi defeated Kudo (c)	Singles match for the KO-D Openweight Championship	21:20
(c) / – the champion(s) heading into the match; D / – this was a dark match

=== Rumble rules match ===
Order	Team	Order eliminated	By	Time
1	Mikami and Shunma Katsumata	1	Tomomitsu Matsunaga and Kouki Iwasaki	1:33
2	Great Kojika and Gorgeous Matsuno	2	Mio Shirai and Hoshitango	2:58
3	Tomomitsu Matsunaga and Kouki Iwasaki	4	Aja Kong and Makoto Oishi	9:00
4	Mio Shirai and Hoshitango	3	Hiroshi Fukuda and Yoshihiko	4:00
5	Hiroshi Fukuda and Yoshihiko	5	Aja Kong and Makoto Oishi	9:12
6	T2Hii (Kazuki Hirata and Toru Owashi)	6	Aja Kong and Makoto Oishi	9:36
7	Aja Kong and Makoto Oishi	—	—	Winners
8	LiLiCo and Suguru Miyatake	7	Aja Kong and Makoto Oishi	16:41
