= Judgement 2012 =

2012 DDT Pro-Wrestling event

- Promotion: DDT Pro-Wrestling
- Date: March 11, 2012
- City: Tokyo, Japan
- Venue: Korakuen Hall
- Attendance: 1,408

Judgement chronology
← Previous; 2011	Next → 2013

Judgement 2012 was a professional wrestling event promoted by DDT Pro-Wrestling (DDT). It took place on March 11, 2012, in Tokyo, Japan, at the Korakuen Hall. It was the sixteenth event under the Judgement name. The event aired domestically on Fighting TV Samurai.

== Storylines ==
Judgement 2012 featured seven professional wrestling matches that involved different wrestlers from pre-existing scripted feuds and storylines. Wrestlers portrayed villains, heroes, or less distinguishable characters in the scripted events that built tension and culminated in a wrestling match or series of matches.

== Results ==
No.	Results	Stipulations	Times
1	Kudo defeated Gota Ihashi	Singles match	07:21
2	Masao Inoue defeated DJ Nira	Singles match	08:57
3	Kana defeated Poison Julie Sawada (c), Antonio Honda, Michael Nakazawa, Tomomitsu Matsunaga, Gorgeous Matsuno, Tigers Mask and Keita Yano	Ironman Battle Royal for the Ironman Heavymetalweight Championship	10:00
4	Harashima, Masa Takanashi and Daisuke Sasaki defeated Makoto Oishi, Akito and Hiroshi Fukuda	Six-man tag team match	10:22
5	Team 246 (Kaz Hayashi and Shuji Kondo) defeated Keisuke Ishii and Shigehiro Irie	Tag team match	13:43
6	New World Japan (Sanshiro Takagi and Soma Takao) defeated Crying Wolf (Yuji Hino and Yasu Urano) (c)	Tag team match for the KO-D Tag Team Championship	15:18
7	Danshoku Dino (c) defeated Hikaru Sato	Singles match for the KO-D Openweight Championship	20:10
(c) / – the champion(s) heading into the match

Ironman Battle Royal Champions

Number	Wrestler	Defeated	Method
895	Michael Nakazawa	Poison Julie Sawada	Jackknife hold
896	Kana	Michael Nakazawa	Slap
897	Antonio Honda	Kana	Pinfall
898	Kana	Antonio Honda	Cross armbreaker
