= Into The Fight 2016 =

2016 DDT Pro-Wrestling event

- Promotion: DDT Pro-Wrestling
- Date: February 28, 2016
- City: Tokyo, Japan
- Venue: Korakuen Hall
- Attendance: 1,596

Event chronology
← Previous; Peter Pan 2015	Next → Judgment 2016

Into The Fight chronology
← Previous; 2015	Next → 2017

Into The Fight 2016 was a professional wrestling event promoted by DDT Pro-Wrestling (DDT). It took place on February 28, 2016, in Tokyo, Japan, at the Korakuen Hall. The event featured eight matches with three championships at stake and was headlined by a match between Shigehiro Irie and Harashima that would determine the first contender to the KO-D Openweight Championship then held by Isami Kodaka. The event aired domestically on Fighting TV Samurai.

== Storylines ==
Into The Fight 2016 featured eight professional wrestling matches involving wrestlers from pre-existing scripted feuds and storylines. Wrestlers portrayed villains, heroes, or less distinguishable characters in the scripted events that built tension and culminated in a wrestling match or series of matches.

== Event ==
=== Pre-show ===
In the pre-show, a dark match saw the team of Mizuki Watase and Kota Umeda take on Hiroshi Fukuda and Guanchulo in an attempt to get rid of the King of Dark Championship. Contrary to regular professional wrestling titles, this one is awarded to the loser of the match who is then forced to wrestle in dark matches. Watase, who was the champion heading into the match, pinned Guanchulo to win the bout and pass the title onto him.

=== Preliminary matches ===
The opening match was T2Hii (Sanshiro Takagi, Toru Owashi and Kazuki Hirata) defending the KO-D 6-Man Tag Team Championship against Kazusada Higuchi, Shunma Katsumata and Kouki Iwasaki, all three from the DDT New Attitude (DNA) sub-brand of DDT focused on showcasing trainees and younger wrestlers. In the closing moments of the match, Hirata caught Iwasaki in the "Miracle One Shot Cradle" but Iwasaki countered the move into a pin of his own to win the match, making himself, Higuchi and Katsumata the first DNA wrestlers to ever win a DDT championship title.

The next title match was a tongue-in-cheek "three-man singles match" that was effectively a regular three-way match in which Kendo Kashin defended the DDT Extreme Division Championship against Antonio Honda and Yoshihiko the blow-up doll. Kashin retained by locking both Yoshihiko and Super Sasadango Machine (who accompanied Yoshihiko to the ring as its second) in a cross armbreaker for a submission victory.

=== Main event ===
In the final match of the evening, Harashima fought Shigehiro Irie to determine a first contender to the KO-D Openweight Championship held by Isami Kodaka. In the end, Harashima was victorious after he hit Irie with two consecutive "Somato" knee strikes and covered him for the pinfall. With the win, Harashima earned a title match against Kodaka at the Judgement 2016 event on March 21.

== Results ==
No.	Results	Stipulations	Times
1^{D}	Mizuki Watase (c) and Kota Umeda defeated Hiroshi Fukuda and Guanchulo	Tag team match for the King of Dark Championship	07:19
2	Kazusada Higuchi, Shunma Katsumata and Kouki Iwasaki defeated T2Hii (Sanshiro Takagi, Toru Owashi and Kazuki Hirata) (c)	Six-man tag team match for the KO-D 6-Man Tag Team Championship	11:58
3	Saki Akai and Makoto Oishi defeated Danshoku Dino and Super Sasadango Machine	Tag team match	08:38
4	Daisuke Sasaki defeated Konosuke Takeshita (with Hiroshi Fukuda)	Singles match	01:41
5	Isami Kodaka and Ryuichi Sekine defeated Smile Squash (Yasu Urano and Akito), Shuten-dōji (Yukio Sakaguchi and Masa Takanashi) and Team Dream Futures (Keisuke Ishii and Soma Takao)	Four-way tag team match	08:50
6	Kendo Kashin (c) defeated Antonio Honda and Yoshihiko (with Super Sasadango Machine) by submission	Three-man singles match for the DDT Extreme Division Championship	10:44
7	Shuji Ishikawa defeated Tetsuya Endo	Singles match	14:44
8	Harashima defeated Shigehiro Irie	Singles match to determine the No. 1 contender for the KO-D Openweight Championship	19:52
(c) / – the champion(s) heading into the match; D / – this was a dark match
