= Nobuhiro Shimatani =

Japanese professional wrestler

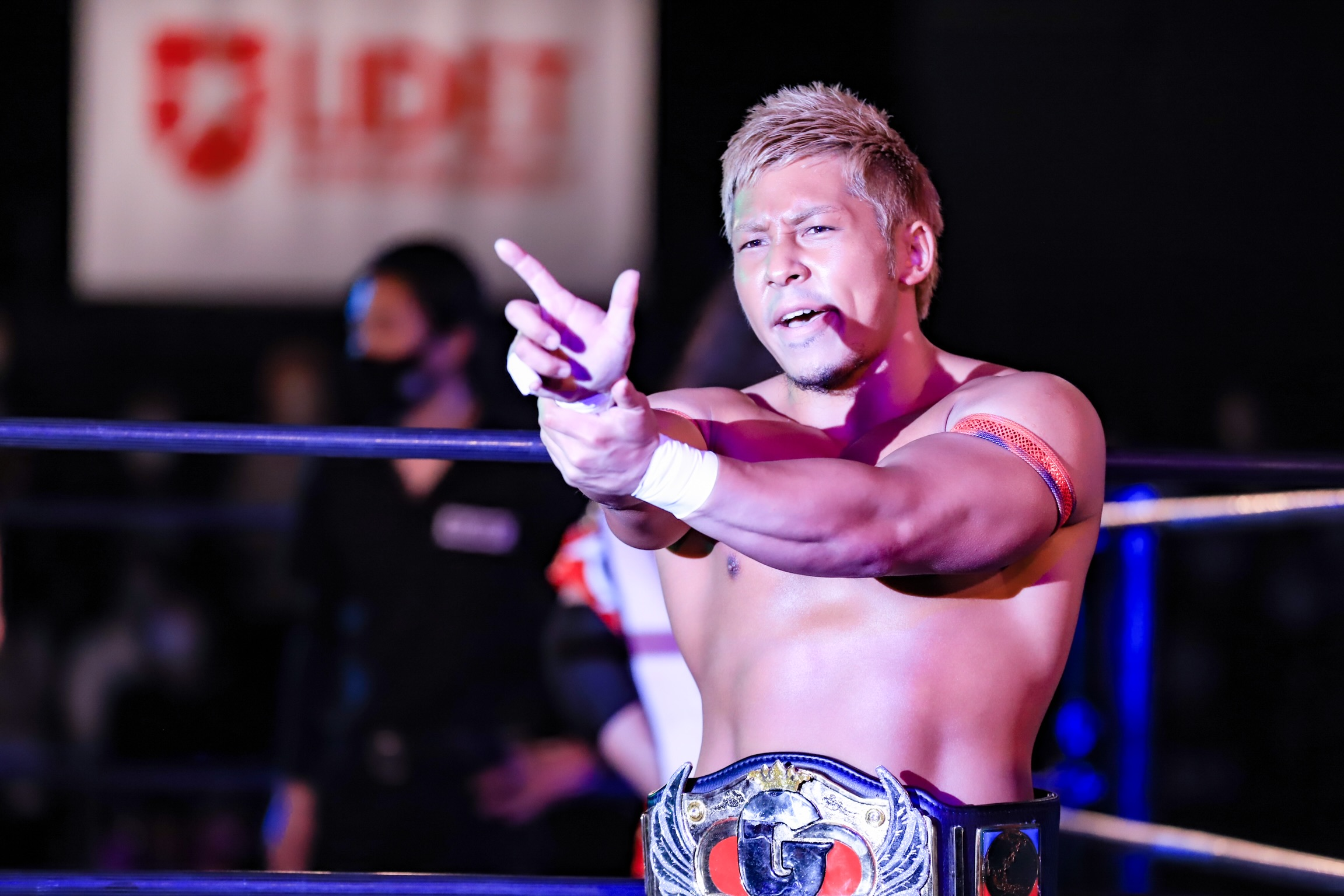
- Shimatani in February 2023

Personal information
- Born: February 27, 1996 (age 30) Yamaguchi, Japan

Professional wrestling career
- Ring names: Bryan Shimatani; Tsunehiro Shimatani; Nobu; Nobu San; NOBU SAN; Nobuhiro Shimatani; Check Shimatani
- Billed height: 157 cm (5 ft 2 in)
- Billed weight: 72 kg (159 lb)
- Trained by: Yasu Urano
- Debut: 2016

Nobuhiro Shimatani (島谷常寛, Shimatani Nobuhiro; born February 27, 1996), also known by his ring name Nobu San, is a Japanese professional wrestler currently working as a freelancer and is best known for his tenure with the Japanese promotion DDT Pro-Wrestling. As of July 2022, he predominantly works for Gleat and Mexican Promotion Lucha Libre AAA Worldwide as a member of the Tokyo Bad Boys stable.

== Professional wrestling career ==
=== Independent circuit (2016–present) ===
As a freelancer, Shimatani works for various promotions. At NOAH Great Voyage In Yokohama Vol. 2, an event promoted by Pro Wrestling Noah on December 16, 2018, he teamed up with Kazusada Higuchi and Kota Umeda in a losing effort to Atsushi Kotoge, Kenoh and Masa Kitamiya. At a house show promoted by Big Japan Pro Wrestling on July 22, 2021, he teamed up with Takato Nakano and Kota Sekifuda to defeat Alejandro, Kazuki Hashimoto and Kosuke Sato.

In April 2024, Shimatani, as Check Shimatani, competed in a soft-ground wrestling match in Uganda for Soft Ground Wrestling (SGW), where he defeated local wrestler KY Kapeeka. During the short tour with the promotion, he was accompanied by Cima.

==== DDT Pro-Wrestling (2016–2022) ====
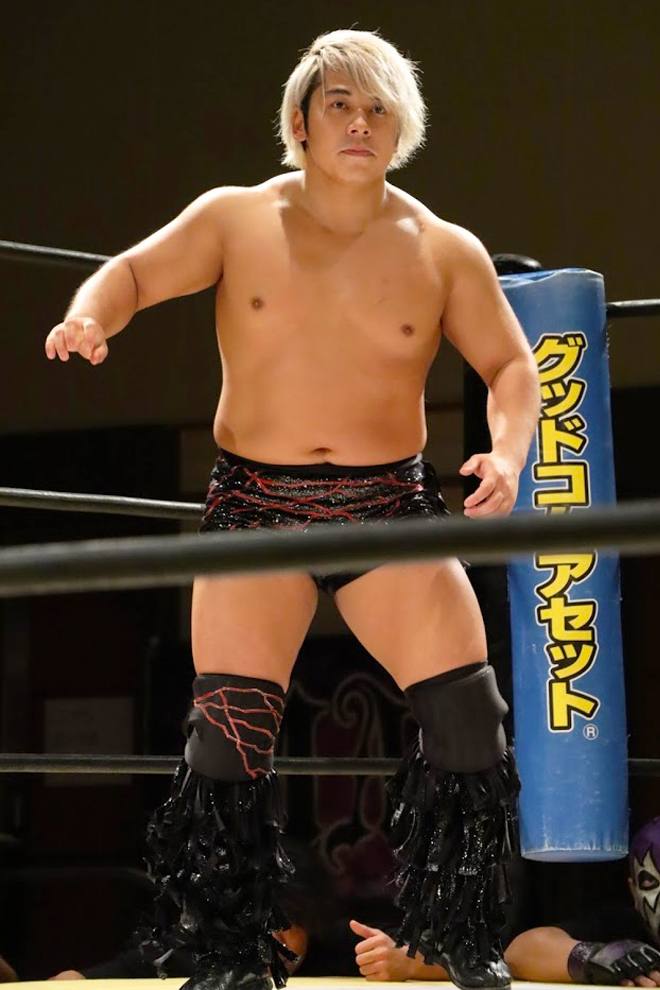
Shimatani in July 2020

Shimatani made his professional wrestling debut at Judgement 2016: DDT 19th Anniversary on March 21 where he teamed up with Kouki Iwasaki and Rainbow Kawamura, losing to Shunma Katsumata, Guanchulo and Mao Inoue in a six-man tag team match. He often wrestled in unusual matches such as a 28-person battle royal in which the winner was granted the general manager position for one night at DDT/Saki Akai Produce DDT Collection on March 14, 2018, match which also involved Danshoku Dino, Harashima, Mao, Yuko Miyamoto and others.

He is known for competing in various of the promotion's signature events just as DDT Judgement. After his debut match at the event, he continued making appearances. One year later at Judgement 2017: DDT 20th Anniversary on March 20, he teamed up with Naomi Yoshimura and Dai Suzuki to defeat Rekka, Daiki Shimomura and Yuki Ueno. At Judgement 2018: DDT 21st Anniversary on March 25, Shimatani teamed up with Daiki Shimomura as "Gran MilliMeters", Takato Nakano and Rekka in a losing effort to Tomomitsu Matsunaga, Hoshitango, Mad Paulie, Cherry and Gota Ihashi as a result of a Ten-person tag team match. At Judgement 2020: DDT 23rd Anniversary on March 20, he teamed up with his fellow Damnation stablemates Tetsuya Endo and T-Hawk in a losing effort against Eruption (Kazusada Higuchi, Yukio Sakaguchi and Saki Akai).

As for the DDT Peter Pan branch of events, Shimatani made his first appearance at Ryōgoku Peter Pan 2016 on August 28 where he teamed up with Chikara and Mitsuo Momota in a losing effort to Tomomitsu Matsunaga, Hoshitango and Rekka as a result of a six-man tag team match for Chikara's King of Dark Championship where had any opponent got pinned by him, they would have become the new champion. At Ryōgoku Peter Pan 2018 on October 21, he won a Rumble rules match by lastly eliminating Gorgeous Matsuno and also competing against Self-Proclaimed Tiger Mask V, Gota Ihashi and others. At Wrestle Peter Pan 2019 on July 15, Shimatani teamed up with Disaster Box (Yuki Ueno and Naomi Yoshimura) in a losing effort against All Out (Shunma Katsumata and Yuki Iino) and Mizuki Watase.

He also worked in the DDT Ultimate Party branch of events, marking his first appearance at Ultimate Party 2019 on November 3 where he teamed up with fellow Damnation stablemates Tetsuya Endo and Mad Paulie to unsuccessfully challenge the champions Takumi Tsukamoto, Yasu Urano and Takato Nakano, and Ken Ohka, Yumehito Imanari and Miss Mongol in a Three-way match for the UWA World Trios Championship. One year later at Ultimate Party 2020 on November 3, he teamed up with Mad Paulie and El Lindaman as #DamnHearts and competed in a Four-way elimination match also involving the teams of Eruption (Kazusada Higuchi, Yukio Sakaguchi and Saki Akai), Disaster Box (Toru Owashi, Naomi Yoshimura and Kazuki Hirata), and Super Sasadango Machine, Makoto Oishi and Antonio Honda.

As for the DDT Into The Fight branch, Shimatani made an important appearance at Into The Fight 2019 on March 21 where he teamed up with fellow Damnation stablemates Tetsuya Endo and Mad Paulie in a losing effort to Bull James, Kota Umeda and Naomi Yoshimura.

Another signature event of the promotion in which he activated was King of DDT, making an appearance at the 2018 edition where he fell short to Mike Bailey in the first round. Two years later at the 2020 edition, he fell short to Yuki Ueno in the same tournament stage.

== Championships and accomplishments ==
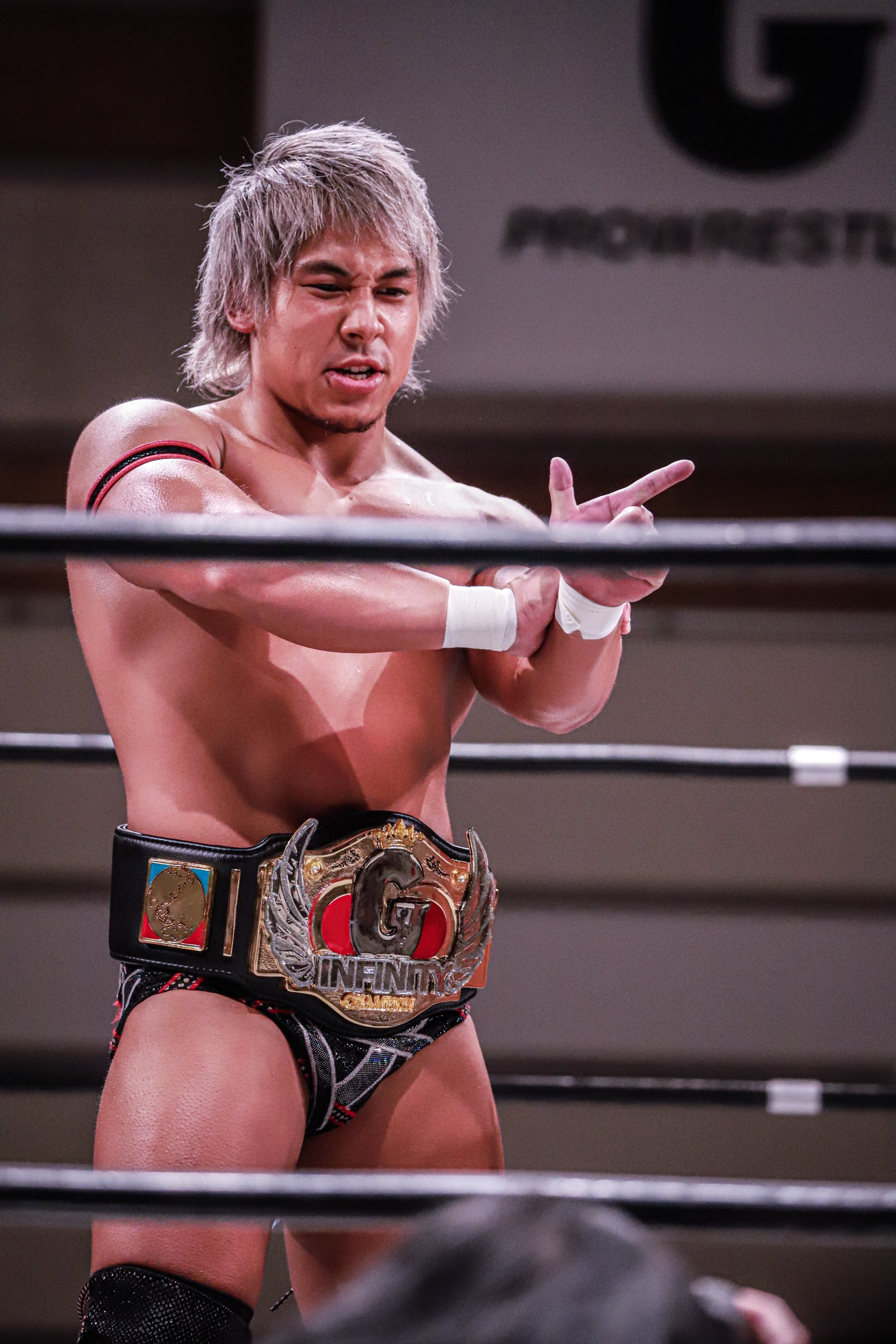
Shimatani is a one-time G-Infinity Champion

- Best Body Japan Pro-Wrestling
  - BBW Tag Team Championship (1 time) – with Yakan Nabe
- DDT Pro-Wrestling
  - Ironman Heavymetalweight Championship (9 times)
  - King of Dark Championship (1 time)
- Gleat
  - G-Infinity Championship (1 time) – with Hayato Tamura
