= Kouki Iwasaki =

Japanese professional wrestler

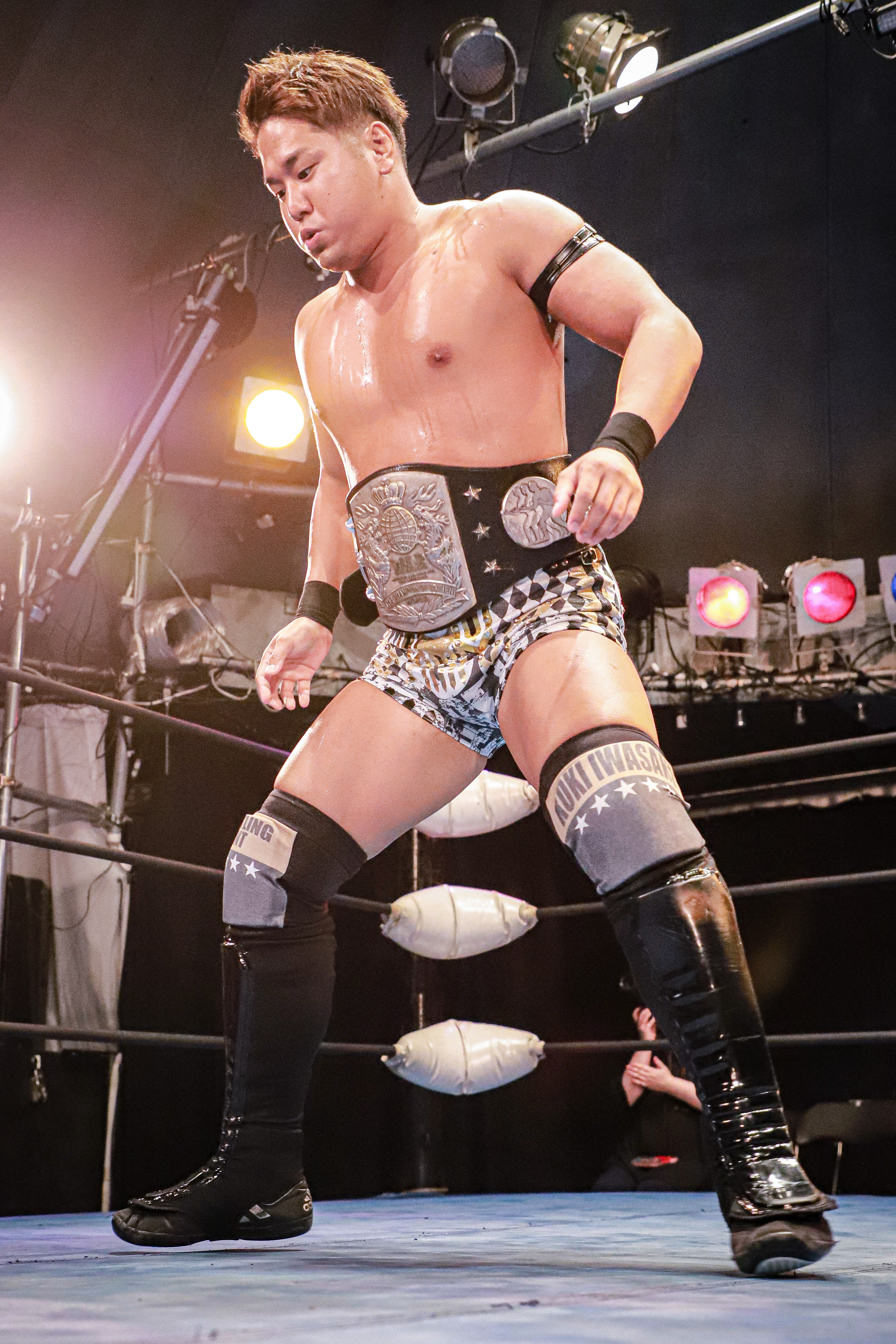
- Iwasaki in July 2023

Personal information
- Born: April 30, 1991 (age 35) Nemuro, Japan

Professional wrestling career
- Ring name: Kouki Iwasaki
- Billed height: 177 cm (5 ft 10 in)
- Billed weight: 99 kg (218 lb)
- Trained by: Kenichi Yamamoto
- Debut: 2014

Kouki Iwasaki (岩崎孝樹, Iwasaki Kouki) is a Japanese professional wrestler best known for his time in the Japanese promotion DDT Pro-Wrestling where he is a former KO-D 6-Man Tag Team Champion and King of Dark Champion.

== Professional wrestling career ==
=== Independent circuit (2014–present) ===
Iwasaki is known for competing several promotions from the Japanese independent scene. One of them is Pro Wrestling Noah. The most notable of his appearances for the companies are first the one from the eleventh night of the NOAH Navigation For The Future from February 1, 2019, where he teamed up with Keisuke Ishii and unsuccessfully challenged Back Breakers (Hajime Ohara and Hitoshi Kumano) for the GHC Junior Heavyweight Tag Team Championship. At CyberFight Festival 2021 on June 6, Iwasaki teamed up with Shuichiro Katsumura and Yumehito Imanari to defeat Ken Ohka, Keisuke Ishii and Shota.

=== DDT Pro Wrestling (2014–present) ===
Iwasaki made his debut in DDT Pro-Wrestling at Dramatic Fanclub Vol. 1, an event promoted on October 18, 2014, where he went into a time-limit draw against Ryota Nakatsu in a dark match.

Iwasaki is known for competing in various of the promotion's signature pay-per-views. His first series of events he evolved in was the DDT Never Mind branch, making his first appearance at the 2014 edition from December 23, where he teamed up with Kazusada Higuchi to defeat Kota Umeda and Ryota Nakatsu. At Never Mind 2017 on December 24, he teamed up with Mizuki Watase and Rekka in a losing effort against All Out (Akito & Diego) and Kazusada Higuchi.

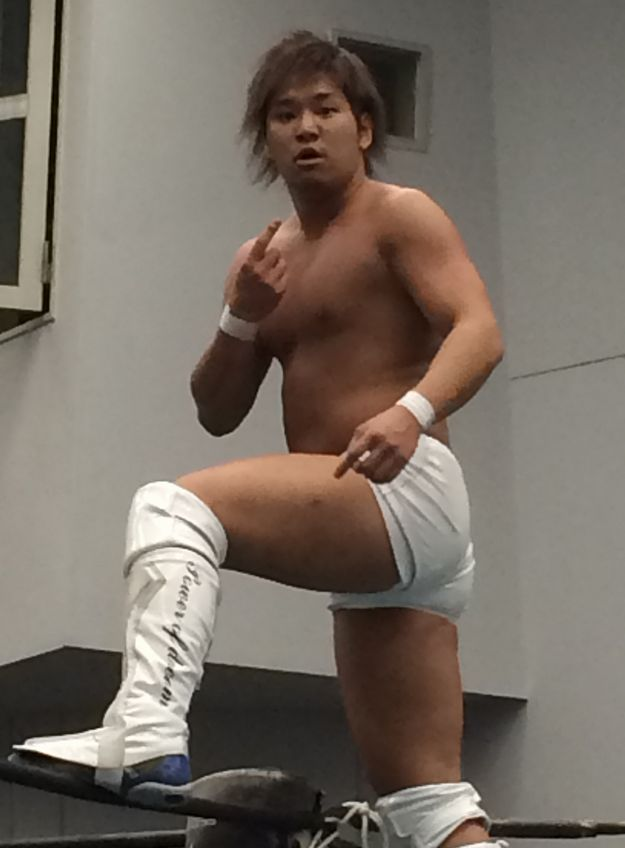
Iwasaki in January 2015

As for the DDT Judgement series of events, Iwasaki made his first appearance at the 2015 edition from March 29, where he competed in a Right To Challenge Anytime, Anywhere Contract Battle Royal won by Harashima and also involving notable opponents such as Konosuke Takeshita, Soma Takao, Daisuke Sasaki, Tetsuya Endo and others. At the 2016 edition from March 21, he teamed up with Rainbow Kawamura and Nobuhiro Shimatani in a losing effort against Shunma Katsumata, Guanchulo and Mao Inoue. At the 2017 edition from March 20, he teamed up with his "Team DNA" stablemates Kazusada Higuchi and Mizuki Watase in a losing effort against NωA (Makoto Oishi, Shunma Katsumata and Mao) and Smile Squash (Soma Takao, Akito and Yasu Urano) in a three-way match for the KO-D 6-Man Tag Team Championship. At the 2018 edition from March 25, he teamed up with Shinichiro Tominaga in a losing effort against Kenshin Chikano and Joe Akira.

In the DDT Peter Pan series, Iwasaki made his first appearance at the 2015 edition from August 23, where he teamed up with Tomomitsu Matsunaga and competed in a Rumble rules tag team match won by Aja Kong and Makoto Oishi, and also involving other notable teams such as Great Kojika and Gorgeous Matsuno, and Mio Shirai and Hoshitango. At the 2016 edition from August 28, Iwasaki teamed up with Mizuki Watase in a losing effort against Kazusada Higuchi and Daiki Shimomura. At the 2017 edition, he teamed up with Yuki Iino in a losing effort against Naomi Yoshimura and Yuki Ueno. At the 2019 edition, he teamed up with Kota Umeda in a losing effort against Kazusada Higuchi and Ryota Nakatsu.

Another branch of events in which Iwasaki competed is DDT Into The Fight. He made his first appearance at the 2016 edition from February 28, where he teamed up with Kazusada Higuchi and Shunma Katsumata and defeated T2Hii (Sanshiro Takagi, Toru Owashi and Kazuki Hirata) to win the KO-D 6-Man Tag Team Championship. At Into The Fight 2017 from February 19, he teamed up with Guanchulo and Mizuki Watase and competed in a Three-way match won by Smile Squash (Akito, Soma Takao and Yasu Urano) and also involving NωA (Makoto Oishi, Mao and Shunma Katsumata). At Into The Fight 2018 on February 25, he competed in a six-way match won by Danshoku Dino ans also involving Akito, Antonio Honda, Mizuki Watase and Saki Akai.

As for the DDT Ultimate Party branch of events, he made his only appearance at the 2019 edition where he teamed up with Shuichiro Katsumura and competed in a Gauntlet tag team match won by Nautilus (Yuki Ueno and Naomi Yoshimura) and also involving Yukio Naya and Cody Hall, Yukio Sakaguchi and Ryota Nakatsu, NEO Itoh Respect Army (Maki Itoh and Chris Brookes) and Bakuretsu Sisters (Nodoka Tenma and Yuki Aino).

Iwasaki competed once in the King of DDT Tournament, at the 2018 edition where he fell short to Antonio Honda in the first rounds from July 31.

=== Ganbare Pro-Wrestling (2019–present) ===
Iwasaki made appearances in Ganbare Pro-Wrestling ever since the promotion was still under the administration of DDT. In 2019 however it became independent and Iwasaki began working as a proper roster member ever since. He took part in the inaugural tournament to determine the first Spirit of Ganbare World Openweight Champion where he fell short to Nobuhiro Shimatani in the first rounds on October 24, 2021. He took part into the Ganbare Climax for the first time in 2021 where he made it to the second rounds on November 7, where he was defeated by Shuichiro Katsumura. At DDT Ganbare Pro Hermit Purple 2020 on March 21, he unsuccessfully challenged Keisuke Ishii for the Independent World Junior Heavyweight Championship.

== Championships and accomplishments ==
- DDT Pro-Wrestling
  - King of Dark Championship (1 time)
  - KO-D 6-Man Tag Team Championship (2 times) – with Kazusada Higuchi and Shunma Katsumata (1); Kazusada Higuchi and Mizuki Watase (1)
  - GWC 6-Man Tag Team Championship (1 time) – with Harukaze and Keisuke Ishii
- Real Japan Pro Wrestling
  - UWA Asia Pacific Heavyweight Championship (1 time)
- Tenryu Project
  - Tenryu Project World 6-Man Tag Team Championship (2 times) – with Kengo and Gaina (1), and Koji Iwamoto and Shigehiro Irie (1)
