= Trans-Am Hiroshi =

Japanese wrestler (born 1987)

Trans-Am★Hiroshi
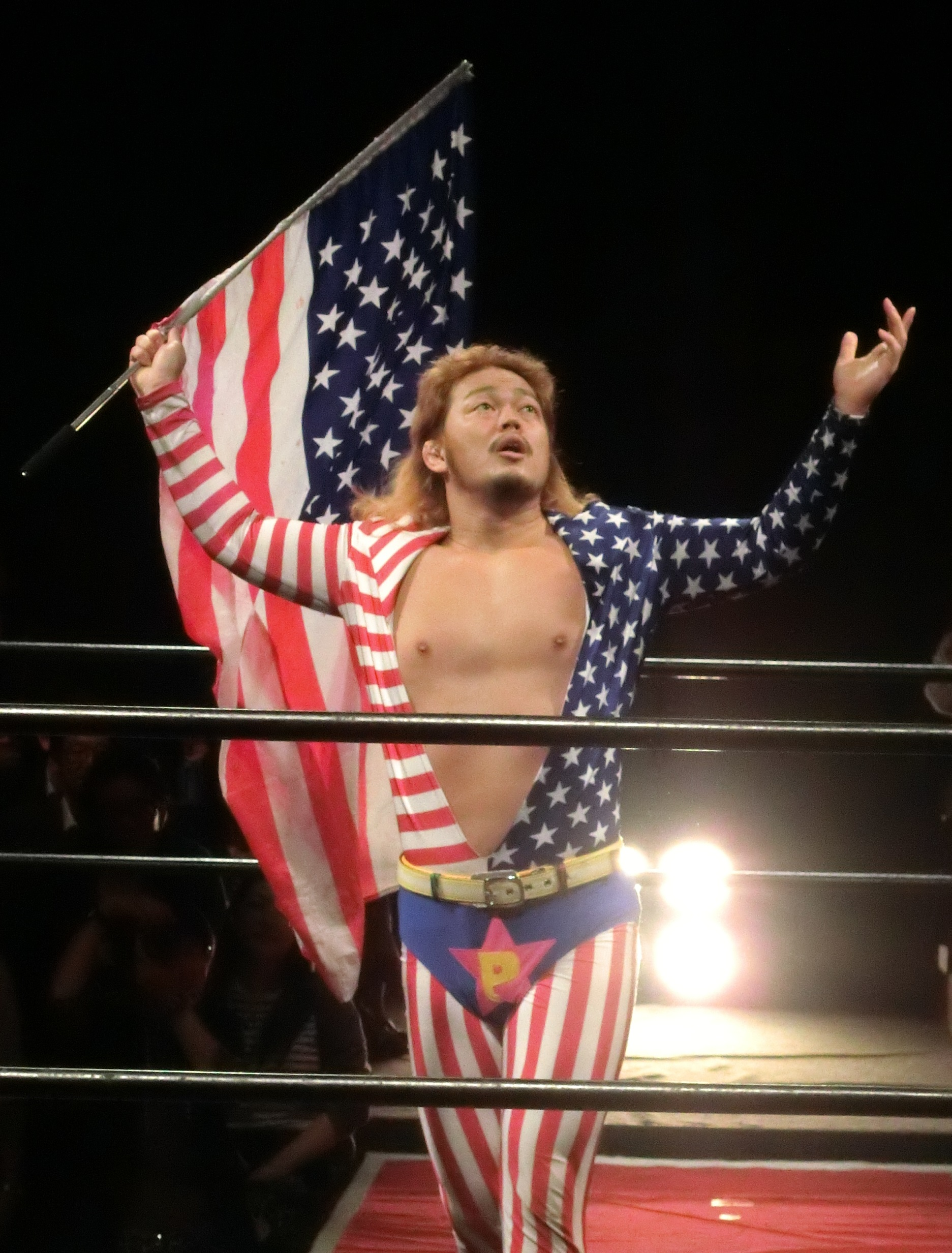
- Hiroshi in May 2016

Personal information
- Born: August 15, 1987 (age 39) Kodaira, Tokyo, Japan

Professional wrestling career
- Ring name(s): Trans-Am★Hiroshi; Nazo Fukumen P Hiroshi Fukuda; Gran Fukuda; Mr. Perfect
- Billed height: 180 cm (5 ft 11 in)
- Billed weight: 105 kg (231 lb)
- Trained by: Men's Teioh
- Debut: 2011

Hiroshi Fukuda (福田宏, Fukuda Hiroshi) better known by his ring name Trans-Am★Hiroshi (トランザム★ヒロシ, Toranzamu Hiroshi) is a Japanese professional wrestler currently working as a freelancer and is best known for his tenure with the Japanese promotions DDT Pro-Wrestling and Kaientai Dojo.

== Professional wrestling career ==
=== Independent circuit (2011-2019, 2020,2021-Present) ===
As a freelancer, Hiroshi is known for working with various promotions. At K-DOJO GWSP6 ~ TEAM69Roll Day, an event promoted by Kaientai Dojo on May 4, 2016, he teamed up with Ricky Fuji to score a victory over Magatsuki (Kengo Mashimo and Yuma). At Ice Ribbon's Tax Pro Wrestling Vol. 4 on March 10, 2019, he teamed up with Sagat to defeat Daiki Shimomura and Ryuichi Sekine. At Gatoh Move Gtmv #24, an event promoted by Gatoh Move Pro Wrestling on December 26, 2019, Hiroshi teamed up with Antonio Honda to defeat Emi Sakura and Lulu Pencil.

==== All Japan Pro Wrestling (2015-2019) ====
Hiroshi made sporadic appearances in All Japan Pro Wrestling. On the sixth night of the Super Power Series 2017 from May 21, Hiroshi competed in a 8-man battle royal for the !BANG! TV World Heavyweight Championship also involving Atsushi Maruyama, Koji Iwamoto, Menso-re Oyaji, Yuma Aoyagi and others. At Summer Action Series 2016 on July 14, 2016, he teamed up with Masanobu Fuchi and Último Dragón, picking up a victory over Osamu Nishimura, Ryuji Hijikata and Sushi in a six-man tag team match.

==== Big Japan Pro Wrestling (2012-2017) ====
At BJW/DDT/K-DOJO Tenka Touitsu!, a cross-over event produced by BJW in partnership with DDT and Kaientai Dojo on December 31, 2013, Hiroshi competed in an 18-man battle royal also involving Brahman Kei and Brahman Shu, Dave Crist and Jake Crist, Soma Takao, Hikaru Sato, Jaki Numazawa, Kankuro Hoshino and others. In the finals of the 2014 edition of the Ikkitousen Strong Climb on July 26, Hiroshi teamed up with Men's Teioh to successfully defend their UWA World Tag Team Championship against Speed Of Sounds (Hercules Senga and Tsutomu Oosugi).

==== DDT Pro Wrestling (2011-present) ====
Fukuda is known for competing in various of the promotion's signature events. One of them is DDT Peter Pan, making his first appearance at Budokan Peter Pan on August 18, 2012 where he competed in a Rumble rules match for the Ironman Heavymetalweight Championship also involving Yoshiaki Fujiwara, DJ Nira, Gorgeous Matsuno, Yuzuki Aikawa and others. One year later at Ryōgoku Peter Pan 2013 on August 18m he teamed up with Yoshiko and Hikaru Shida falling short to Masa Takanashi, Cherry and Saki Akai in a six-person tag team match. At Ryōgoku Peter Pan 2014 on August 17, Hiroshi teamed up with Aja Kong and Antonio Honda in a losing effort to Saki Akai, Makoto Oishi and Ladybeard. Hiroshi was part of the "Happy Motel" stable and at Ryōgoku Peter Pan 2016 on August 28 he teamed up with fellow stablemate Antonio Honda and Ladybeard and Gorgeous Matsuno unsuccessfully challenging NωA (Makoto Oishi, Shunma Katsumata and Mao) and Super Sasadango Machine.

As for the DDT Judgement branch of events, Hiroshi made his first appearance at Judgement 2012 on March 11 where he teamed up with Makoto Oishi and Akito in a losing effort to Harashima, Masa Takanashi and Daisuke Sasaki. He is known for competing in Right To Challenge Anytime, Anywhere Contract Battle Royal for various titles in this group of events. At Judgement 2013 he made an appearance in such a match facing the likes of Keisuke Ishii, DJ Nira, Hikaru Sato, Mikami. At Judgement 2015 on March 29, Hiroshi wrestled in the same kind of match also involving Daisuke Sasaki, Kazuki Hirata, Yasu Urano and others.

Another branch of events in which Hiroshi competed is DDT Ultimate Party, making his first appearance at Ultimate Party 2019 on November 3 where he teamed up with Danshoku Dino, Asuka, Yuki Iino and Mizuki to defeat Super Sasadango Machine, Yuna Manase, Jiro "Ikemen" Kuroshio, Hiroshi Yamato and Makoto Oishi in a Ten-person tag team match for the vacant KO-D 10-Man Tag Team Championship.

Another pay-per-view in which he made appearances is DDT Into The Fight. At Into The Fight 2016 on February 28 he accompanied Konosuke Takeshita at ringside in a match which the latter lost against Daisuke Sasaki. The same night he competed for the King of Dark Championship in a tag team match in which he paired up with Guanchulo falling short to Mizuki Watase and Kota Umeda

At the 2015 edition of the King of DDT Tournament on June 6 Hiroshi fell short to Makoto Oishi in a first-round match.

== Championships and accomplishments ==
- DDT Pro-Wrestling
  - Ironman Heavymetalweight Championship (13 times)
  - KO-D 10-Man Tag Team Championship (1 time) – with Danshoku Dino, Asuka, Yuki Iino and Mizuki
- Kaientai Dojo
  - Strongest-K Tag Team Championship (1 time) – with Shiori Asahi
- Pro-Wrestling Basara
  - Itadaki (2016)
- Union Pro-Wrestling
  - UWA World Tag Team Championship (1 time) – with Men's Teioh
  - World Aipoke Championship (1 time)
