= DJ Nira =

Japanese professional wrestler

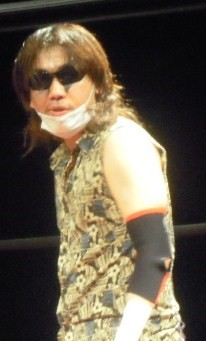
- DJ Nira in September 2012

Personal information
- Born: January 14 Niigata, Japan

Professional wrestling career
- Ring name(s): DJ Nira; Mad Dog Nira; Date Masamune; Baka Michinoku; The Great Nira
- Billed height: 170 cm (5 ft 7 in)
- Billed weight: 75 kg (165 lb)
- Trained by: Taka Michinoku
- Debut: 2002

DJ Nira (DJニラ, Dī Jē Nira; lit. "DJ Garlic Chive") is a Japanese freelance professional wrestler. He is best known for his tenure with the Japanese wrestling promotions DDT Pro-Wrestling and Active Advance Pro Wrestling, then known as Kaientai Dojo.

== Professional wrestling career ==
=== Independent circuit (2002–present) ===
Nira has worked with several different promotions as a freelance wrestler. During the 5th Anniversary of NEO Women's Pro Wrestling show on May 5, 2005, Nira took part in one of the longest matches in professional wrestling history, a 55-person battle royal in which he competed against Yuki Miyazaki, Kayoko Haruyama, Tetsuhiro Kuroda, Command Bolshoi, eventual winner Kyoko Inoue, and several others. On the second night of the 2005 Differ Cup, held by Pro Wrestling Noah, Nira teamed up with Stalker Ichikawa and was defeated by Awesome Kong in a 2-on-1 handicap match. At AJPW/RO&D Festival, an event promoted by All Japan Pro Wrestling on September 11, 2005, Nira teamed up with Kikutaro and Eggman in a losing effort against the Voodoo Murders (Chuck Palumbo, Johnny Stamboli and Taru) in a six-man tag team match.

==== Kaientai Dojo (2002–2017) ====
On April 20, 2002, Nira made his professional wrestling debut at First Impression, an event promoted by Kaientai Dojo, where he teamed up with Apple Miyuki and Maya and unsuccessfully challenged Psycho in a 3-on-1 handicap match. At K-DOJO Club-K Free on November 3, 2004, he competed in a 28-man battle royal to determine the #1 contender for the Strongest-K Championship alongside Gentaro, Hi69, Taka Michinoku, Quiet Storm and other wrestlers.

==== DDT Pro-Wrestling (2004–present) ====
Nira is best known for his tenure with DDT Pro-Wrestling, where he is an eleven-time Ironman Heavymetalweight Champion. He has often wrestled in unusual matches during his time at the promotion, including a 34-person tag team match during the 2015 edition of DDT New Year's Gift Special where he teamed up with sixteen tag partners including Daisuke Sasaki, Kota Ibushi, Michael Nakazawa, Saki Akai and Super Sasadango Machine to defeat Makoto Oishi, Shuji Ishikawa, Konosuke Takeshita, Sanshiro Takagi, Shigehiro Irie, and others. He also participated in a drinking match on October 14, 2023 at BJW/DDT/K-DOJO Sapporo Pro-Wrestling Festa, a cross-over event produced by DDT in partnership with Kaientai Dojo and Big Japan Pro Wrestling, where he teamed up with Ryuji Ito to defeat Masa Takanashi and Ryuichi Sekine.

Nira has also worked in many of the promotion's signature events. Among them was DDT Peter Pan, an annual event in which he frequently participated in rumble rules matches for the Ironman Heavymetalweight Championship. He first appeared at Peter Pan on August 23, 2009, where he competed in a rumble match alongside Toru Owashi, Giru Nakano, Yumiko Hotta, Riho, and others. On July 24, 2011, Nira participated in another rumble rules match during Ryōgoku Peter Pan 2011 alongside Yuzuki Aikawa, Tsuyoshi Kikuchi, Emi Sakura, Cherry, and other notable wrestlers. At Budokan Peter Pan on August 18, 2012, Nira unsuccessfully defended his Ironman Heavymetalweight Championship in a rumble match, in which he faced Mio Shirai, Tomomitsu Matsunaga, Ken Ohka, eventual winner Yoshiaki Fujiwara, and others.

Nira has also made multiple appearances at DDT Judgement. His debut came at Judgement 2009 on April 5, 2009, when he defeated Mammoth Handa and Yoshiaki Yago in a three-way match to qualify for a #1 Contendership Double Chance Battle Royal. The match, featuring a contract suspended above the ring, was for the KO-D Openweight Championship, and involved Daisuke Sekimoto, Poison Sawada Julie, Kazuhiro Tamura, eventual winner Harashima, and others. At Judgement 2016: DDT 19th Anniversary on March 21, 2016, Nira teamed up with Dai Suzuki to defeat Seiya Morohashi and Hoshitango. Morohashi was the King of Dark Champion at the time of the match; however, Nira did not win the title from him due to a special rule under which a loss counted as a successful title defense.

== Championships and accomplishments ==
- DDT Pro-Wrestling
  - Ironman Heavymetalweight Championship (11 times)
- Gatoh Move Pro Wrestling
  - IWA Triple Crown Championship (1 time)
