= King of Dark Championship =

Professional wrestling championship

- The King of Dark Championship belt

Details
- Promotion: DDT Pro-Wrestling
- Date established: February 15, 2015
- Date retired: December 13, 2017
Statistics
- First champion: Gota Ihashi
- Final champion: Dai Suzuki
- Most reigns: Gota Ihashi (6 reigns)
- Longest reign: Gota Ihashi (182 days)
- Shortest reign: Seiya Morohashi (<1 day)

The King of Dark Championship (Japanese: キング・オブ・ダーク王座, Hepburn: Kingu obu Dāku Ōza) was a professional wrestling championship created by Amon Tsurumi. The champion was forced to wrestle exclusively in dark matches on DDT shows. Contrary to regular professional wrestling championships, the title was not rewarded to the winner of the match, but was given to the loser instead.

== Title history ==
Key
No.	Overall reign number
Reign	Reign number for the specific champion
Days	Number of days held
Defenses	Number of successful defenses
<1	Reign lasted less than a day

No.	Champion	Championship change			Reign statistics			Notes	Ref.
No.	Champion	Date	Event	Location	Reign	Days	Defenses	Notes	Ref.
1	Gota Ihashi	February 15, 2015	Saitama Super DDT 2015	Saitama, Japan	1	111	11	Lost a tag team dark match with DJ Nira against Hiroshi Fukuda and Hoshitango, with Fukuda pinning Ihashi, therefore "branding" him to be the inaugural champion.	
2	Suguru Miyatake	June 6, 2015	King of DDT 2015 Saitama	Kasukabe, Japan	1	8	1		
3	Gota Ihashi	June 14, 2015	King of DDT 2015 Osaka	Osaka, Japan	2	105	14	Lost a tag team dark match with Hiroshi Fukuda against champion Suguru Miyatake and Kota Umeda, with Miyatake pinning Ihashi.	
4	Sanshiro Takagi	September 27, 2015	Who's Gonna Top?: DDT Dramatic General Election 2015	Tokyo, Japan	1	37	4		
5	Kenso	November 3, 2015	Friendship, Effort, Victory in Nagoya 2015	Nagoya, Japan	1	5	0		
6	Kouki Iwasaki	November 8, 2015	Saitama Slam! Vol. 6	Kasukabe, Japan	1	35	4	This was a three-way dark match, also involving Gota Ihashi.	
7	Dai Suzuki	December 13, 2015	Super Star Lane 2015	Hakata, Japan	1	10	0		
8	Gota Ihashi	December 23, 2015	Never Mind 2015	Tokyo, Japan	3	31	2	Lost a tag team dark match with Gorgeous Matsuno against champion Dai Suzuki and Kouki Iwasaki, with Suzuki pinning Ihashi.	
9	Seiya Morohashi	January 23, 2016	Keisuke Ishii Produce: New Year! Momoiro Kneel Kick 2016	Tokorozawa, Japan	1	<1	0		
10	Gota Ihashi	January 23, 2016	Keisuke Ishii Produce: New Year! Momoiro Kneel Kick 2016	Tokorozawa, Japan	4	8	1		
11	Mizuki Watase	January 31, 2016	Sweet Dreams! 2016	Tokyo, Japan	1	28	2	Lost a tag team dark match with Hiroshi Fukuda against champion Gota Ihashi and Tomomitsu Matsunaga, with Ihashi pinning Watase.	
12	Guanchulo	February 28, 2016	Into The Fight 2016	Tokyo, Japan	1	6	0	Lost a tag team dark match with Hiroshi Fukuda against champion Mizuki Watase and Kota Umeda, with Watase pinning Guanchulo.	
13	Seiya Morohashi	March 5, 2016	Saitama Slam! Vol. 9	Kasukabe, Japan	2	28	1	Lost a tag team dark match with Hoshitango against champion Guanchulo and DJ Nira, with Guanchulo pinning Morohashi.	
14	Hoshitango	April 2, 2016	Saitama Slam! Vol. 10	Kasukabe, Japan	1	22	0		
15	Gota Ihashi	April 24, 2016	Max Bump 2016	Tokyo, Japan	5	27	1	This was a three-way dark match, also involving Tomomitsu Matsunaga.	
16	Yumehito Imanari	May 21, 2016	Saitama Slam! Vol. 11	Kasukabe, Japan	1	77	2		
17	Chikara	August 6, 2016	Saitama Slam! Vol. 13	Kasukabe, Japan	1	50	2		
18	Nobuhiro Shimatani	September 25, 2016	Who's Gonna Top?: DDT Dramatic General Election 2016 – The Last Hope Special	Tokyo, Japan	1	147	11	Lost a 6-man tag team dark match with Guanchulo and Rekka against champion Chikara, Kenso and Gota Ihashi, with Chikara pinning Shimatani.	
19	Gota Ihashi	February 19, 2017	Into The Fight 2017	Tokyo, Japan	6	182	2		
20	Dai Suzuki	August 20, 2017	Ryōgoku Peter Pan 2017	Tokyo, Japan	2	115	1	This was a Street Fight.	
—	Deactivated	December 13, 2017	—	—	—	—	—	Deactivated upon Suzuki's retirement.	

== List of combined reigns ==
In the context of this title rules, a defense means a loss.

Rank	Wrestler	No. of reigns	Combined defenses	Combined days
1	Gota Ihashi	6	31	464
2	Nobuhiro Shimatani	1	11	147
3	Dai Suzuki	2	1	125
4	Yumehito Imanari	1	2	77
5	Chikara	1	2	50
6	Sanshiro Takagi	1	4	37
7	Kouki Iwasaki	1	4	35
8	Seiya Morohashi	2	1	28
8	Mizuki Watase	1	2	28
10	Hoshitango	1	0	22
11	Suguru Miyatake	1	1	8
12	Guanchulo	1	0	6
13	Kenso	1	0	5

== See also ==
- Dramatic Dream Team
- Professional wrestling in Japan
