= Guanchulo =

Chilean professional wrestler

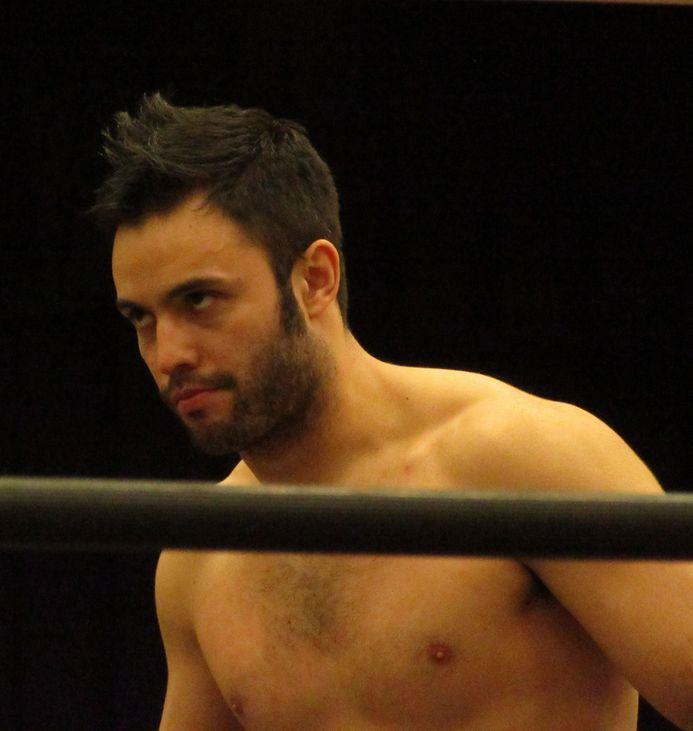
- Guanchulo in October 2016

Personal information
- Born: September 16, 1987 (age 38) Rancagua, Chile

Professional wrestling career
- Ring name(s): Evgeniy Kamentsev; El Perro Washo; Diego; Guanchulo
- Billed height: 1.75 m (5 ft 9 in)
- Billed weight: 80 kg (176 lb)
- Trained by: Agressor; Kesmai
- Debut: 2005

Guanchulo is a Chilean professional wrestler, currently working as a freelancer and is best known for his time with DDT Pro-Wrestling (DDT). He is also a full-time coach in the Chilean independent wrestling scene.

== Professional wrestling career ==
=== Independent circuit (2007–present) ===
Guanchulo worked a match for Lucha Libre AAA Worldwide on the second night of the Lucha Libre World Cup 2017 which took place on October 10, teaming up with Sumire Natsu and Danny Jones, scoring a defeat against Heidi Katrina, Recca, and Taylor Adams in an International trios match. He also worked for Gatoh Move Pro Wrestling, making his last appearance at Gatoh Move Japan Tour #268 on January 3, 2017, where he teamed up with Sayaka Obihiro and Emi Sakura in a losing effort to Madoka, Riho and Kotori.

==== DDT Pro-Wrestling (2013–2017) ====
Guanchulo made his debut for DDT Pro-Wrestling on May 3, 2013, at DDT Max Bump 2013 in a dark match where he teamed up with Tomomitsu Matsunaga in a losing effort to Aggressor and Tatsuhiko Yoshino. He continued to make sporadic appearances such as at King Of DDT Tokyo 2013 from June 28, where he competed in a scramble battle royal, going against other superstars like the winner Daisuke Sasaki, Hoshitango and Michael Nakazawa. His first title opportunity match in DDT was at God Bless DDT 2013 from November 17, where he competed for the Ironman Heavymetalweight Championship in a No.1 contendership battle royal, coming out successfully against Gota Ihashi, Hikaru Sato, Soma Takao and others. He lost the title match to the champion Harashima which took place at Never Mind Series 2013 In Sendai on November 24.

Guanchulo participated in one of the biggest matches in DDT, a 28-man tag team match from DDT New Year's Gift Special 2014, where he teamed up with notable partners such as Kota Ibushi, Kudo and Kenny Omega to defeat Masa Takanashi, Gorgeous Matsuno, Keisuke Ishii and others. At Into The Fight 2014, he participated in another battle royal for the Ironman Heavymetalweight Championship where he came unsuccessfully again against the winner Daichi Kakimoto, the former champion Yasu Urano, Emi Sakura and Saki Akai. One month later, on March 21 at Judgement 2014, he competed in a 12-man battle royal also involving Yukio Sakaguchi and Super Sasadango Machine where he got eliminated the fifth, but won the right to challenge his favourite wrestler by grabbing one of the five envelopes suspended above the ring.

At Into The Fight 2016 he won the King of Dark Championship in a four-way match also involving Mizuki Watase, Kota Umeda and Hiroshi Fukuda, getting pinned by Watase who was the reigning champion. At Judgement 2016: DDT 19th Anniversary, he teamed up with Mao and Shunma Katsumata to defeat Kouki Iwasaki, Rainbow Kawamura and Nobuhiro Shimatani in a six-man tag team match. Guanchulo competed in a No.1 condendership battle royal for a right to challenge the KO-D Openweight Champion at Dramatic General Election 2016, match won by Kazusada Higuchi and also involving Makoto Oishi, Ken Ohka and Sanshiro Takagi. At Judgement 2017: DDT 20th Anniversary, he won an 18-man rumble match for both Ironman Heavymetalweight Championship and King of Dark Championship also inovling Poison Sawada Julie, Mad Paulie, Mikami and others. However he did not capture the King of Dark title because you have to lose a match to win it. Later that night, he dropped the Ironman title to Yoshihiko a rubber doll.

=== Campeonato Nacional de Lucha Libre ===
Guanchulo returned in the Chilean independent scene at the beginning of 2018, continuing his tenure with CNL after his 5-year period in Japan. At CNL Temporada #2.11, a house show of the promotion which took place on March 19, 2021, he teamed up with his old tag team partner El Mostro to capture the CNL Tag Team Championship after defeating The Chilean Empire (Al Cold and Eddie Vergara).

== Championships and accomplishments ==
- Campeonato Nacional de Lucha Libre

- CNL Metropolitan Championship (1 time)
- CNL Tag Team Championship (1 time) - with El Mostro

- DDT Pro-Wrestling

- King of Dark Championship (1 time)
- KO-D 6-Man Tag Team Championship (1 time) – with Akito and Konosuke Takeshita
- Ironman Heavymetalweight Championship (4 times)

- Fenix Lucha Libre

- FNX Championship (1 time)

- Legion

- Legion Maximo Championship (1 time)

- MAX Lucha Libre

- MAX Maximo Championship (3 times)
- MAX Hardcore Championship (1 time)

- Wrestling Knock Out

- WKO Championship (1 time)
