= Gota Ihashi =

Japanese professional wrestler

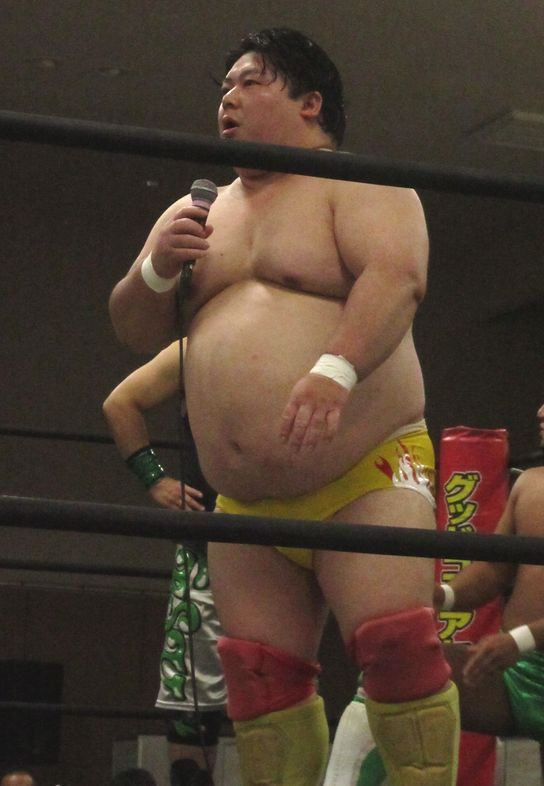
- Ihashi in 2016

Personal information
- Born: November 28, 1983 (age 42) Chiba, Japan

Professional wrestling career
- Ring name(s): Shinya Ihashimoto; Hollywood GOTA; Brazo de Gotha; Sanzoku B Gota Ihashi
- Billed height: 1.58 m (5 ft 2 in)
- Billed weight: 110 kg (243 lb)
- Debut: 2006

Isao Ihashi (石橋 勇, Ihashi Isao; born November 28, 1983), better known by his ring name Gota Ihashi (伊橋剛太, Ihashi Gōta), is a Japanese professional wrestler working for the Japanese professional wrestling promotion DDT Pro-Wrestling (DDT).

== Professional wrestling career ==
=== Independent circuit (2006–present) ===
Ihashi had been sporadically wrestling in Dramatic Dream Team as a comedy “fat clone” of Kota Ibushi for quite a long time before being officially introduced in the roster in June 2009. His first professional wrestling match took place at DDT Kota Ibushi Produce - Beer Garden Fight 8/8 on August 8, 2006, where he teamed up with Poco Takanashi and Tanomusaku Toba and lost to Kota Ibushi, Kudo and Chōun Shiryu in a six-man tag team match. He participated in one of the longest matches in professional wrestling history, a 108-man battle royal at Tenka Sanbun no Kei: New Year's Eve Special, a cross-over event held between Big Japan Pro Wrestling, DDT and Kaientai Dojo from December 31, 2009, competing against other infamous wrestlers such as Great Kojika, Taka Michinoku, Kenny Omega, Abdullah Kobayashi, and the winner of the match, Jun Kasai.

=== DDT Pro-Wrestling (2009–present) ===
During his tenure with DDT, Ihashi won various titles such as the King of Dark Championship, a title which was awarded to the loser of the match, which he first won at Saitama Super DDT 2015 on February 15, where he lost a tag team dark match with DJ Nira against Hiroshi Fukuda and Hoshitango, with Fukuda pinning Ihashi, therefore "branding" him to be the inaugural champion. At Road to Ryōgoku in Hiroshima on May 26, 2013, he teamed up with Kenny Omega and Kota Ibushi as Golden☆Rendezvous～ to defeat Monster Army (Antonio Honda, Daisuke Sasaki and Yuji Hino) for the KO-D 6-Man Tag Team Championship. On May 22, 2016, at DDT Dramatic Dreams! Vol. 3 ~Hana Mo Hana Nare Hito Mo Hito Nare~, Ihashi teamed up with a returning Kota Ibushi to win a luxury prize tag team rumble match also involving teams such as Kat-Too (Makoto Oishi and Shunma Katsumata), Atsushi Maruyama and Joey Ryan or Emi Sakura and Masa Takanashi. Ihashi is a former multiple-time Ironman Heavymetalweight Champion, title which he last won two times, at DDT Saitama Slam! Vol. 16 on November 26, 2016, by defeating Kazuki Hirata and Nobuhiro Shimatani. Ihasi participated in a Ten-person tag team match which took place at Judgement 2018: DDT 21st Anniversary on March 25, where he teamed up with Cherry, Tomomitsu Matsunaga, Hoshitango and Mad Paulie to defeat Mizuki Watase, Rekka, Gran MilliMeters (Daiki Shimomura and Nobuhiro Shimatani) and Takato Nakano. He worked with many other personalities in DDT. At Who’s Gonna Top? on September 29, 2019, he teamed up with Danshoku Dino and Hoshitango to face Disaster Box (Kazuki Hirata and Toru Owashi), and Yukio Sakaguchi, match which ended in a no-contest. At DDT TV Show! #2 on May 9, 2020, Ihashi battled Konosuke Takeshita in a losing effort.

== Championships and accomplishments ==
- Best Body Japan Pro-Wrestling
  - BBW Tag Team Championship (2 times) – with Toru Owashi (1) and Danshoku Dino (1)
  - BBW 6-Man Tag Team Championship (1 time, current) – with Toru Owashi and Danshoku Dino]
- DDT Pro-Wrestling
  - King of Dark Championship (6 times)
  - Ironman Heavymetalweight Championship (7 times)
  - KO-D 6-Man Tag Team Championship (1 time) – with Kenny Omega and Kota Ibushi
