= God Bless DDT =

- Promotions: DDT Pro-Wrestling (2002–2019); CyberFight (2022–2024)
- Brands: DDT Pro-Wrestling (2022–2024)
- First event: God Bless DDT
- Last event: God Bless DDT 2024

God Bless DDT was a recurring professional wrestling event held annually by DDT Pro-Wrestling (DDT) in autumn. Originally held by DDT as an independent promotion between 2002 and 2019, it was then held by CyberFight for three editions held as DDT-branded events from 2022 to 2024.

== History ==
Between 2002 and 2019, God Bless DDT was produced by DDT Pro-Wrestling, an independent promotion founded in 1997 by Shintaro Muto and Pro Wrestling Crusaders alumni Kyohei Mikami, Kazushige Nosawa and Sanshiro Takagi. The event was held in late November. In 2020, DDT and its subsidiaries merged with Pro Wrestling Noah into a new company called CyberFight owned by the digital advertising company CyberAgent, with DDT and Noah persisting as separate brands under the CyberFight umbrella. God Bless DDT was then held from 2022 to 2024 as a DDT-branded event, and moved to October.

== Events ==
#	Event	Date	City	Venue	Main event	Ref.
1	God Bless DDT	November 29, 2002	Tokyo, Japan	Korakuen Geopolis	Sanshiro Takagi (c) vs. Gentaro for the KO-D Openweight Championship	
2	God Bless DDT 2003 in Osaka	November 30, 2003	Osaka, Japan	IMP Hall	Tomohiko Hashimoto and Seiya Morohashi (c) vs. Mikami and Onryo vs. Kudo and Hero! in a three-way elimination match for the CMLL KO-D Tag Team Championship	
3	God Bless DDT 2004	November 28, 2004	Osaka, Japan	IMP Hall	Sanshiro Takagi, Mikami, Riki Sensyu and Daichi Kakimoto vs. Far East Connection (Dick Togo, Tomohiko Hashimoto, Yoshiya and Sho Kanzaki)	
4	God Bless DDT 2005 in Nagoya	November 27, 2005	Nagoya, Japan	Nakamura Sports Center	Danshoku Dino and Men's Teioh vs. Shacho-ha (Riki Sensyu and Super Uchuu Power)	
5	God Bless DDT 2006	November 23, 2006	Tokyo, Japan	Shinjuku Face	Harashima vs. Kudo to determine the No. 1 contender for the KO-D Openweight Championship	
6	God Bless DDT 2007	November 27, 2007	Tokyo, Japan	Korakuen Hall	Harashima (c) vs. Mikami for the KO-D Openweight Championship	
7	God Bless DDT 2008	November 30, 2008	Tokyo, Japan	Korakuen Hall	Disaster Box (Toru Owashi and Harashima) (c) vs. Sanshiro Takagi and Shuji Ishikawa for the CMLL KO-D Tag Team Championship	
8	God Bless DDT 2009	November 15, 2009	Tokyo, Japan	Shinjuku Face	Kudo and Yasu Urano (c) vs. Belt Hunter × Hunter (Danshoku Dino and Keisuke Ishii) for the CMLL KO-D Tag Team Championship	
9	God Bless DDT 2010	November 28, 2010	Tokyo, Japan	Korakuen Hall	Hikaru Sato (c) vs. Dick Togo for the KO-D Openweight Championship	
10	God Bless DDT 2011	November 27, 2011	Tokyo, Japan	Korakuen Hall	Kudo (c) vs. Harashima for the KO-D Openweight Championship	
11	God Bless DDT 2013	November 17, 2013	Tokyo, Japan	Korakuen Hall	Yankee Nichokenju (Isami Kodaka and Yuko Miyamoto) (c) vs. Golden☆Lovers (Kota Ibushi and Kenny Omega) for the KO-D Tag Team Championship	
12	God Bless DDT 2014	November 30, 2014	Tokyo, Japan	Korakuen Hall	Harashima (c) vs. Soma Takao for the KO-D Openweight Championship	
13	God Bless DDT 2016	November 23, 2016	Tokyo, Japan	Korakuen Hall	Damnation (Shuji Ishikawa and Tetsuya Endo) vs. Harashima and Konosuke Takeshita	
14	God Bless DDT 2017	November 23, 2017	Tokyo, Japan	Korakuen Hall	HarashiMarufuji (Harashima and Naomichi Marufuji) (c) vs. All Out (Konosuke Takeshita and Akito) for the KO-D Tag Team Championship	
15	God Bless DDT 2019	November 24, 2019	Tokyo, Japan	Korakuen Hall	Harashima (c) vs. Yuki Iino for the KO-D Openweight Championship	
16	God Bless DDT 2022	October 23, 2022	Tokyo, Japan	Korakuen Hall	Kazusada Higuchi (c) vs. Yukio Sakaguchi for the KO-D Openweight Championship	
17	God Bless DDT 2023	October 22, 2023	Tokyo, Japan	Korakuen Hall	The37Kamiina (Yuki Ueno and Mao) vs. Chris Brookes and Harashima	
18	God Bless DDT 2024	October 20, 2024	Tokyo, Japan	Korakuen Hall	Shinya Aoki (c) vs. Harashima for the KO-D Openweight Championship then Shinya Aoki (c) vs. Shunma Katsumata for the KO-D Openweight Championship in Katsumata's Right to Challenge Anytime Anywhere cash-in match	
(c) – refers to the champion(s) heading into the match

== Results ==
=== 2002 ===
God Bless DDT
- Promotion: Dramatic Dream Team
- Date: November 29, 2002
- City: Tokyo, Japan
- Venue: Korakuen Geopolis
- Attendance: 616

Event chronology
← Previous; Dead or Alive	Next → Never Mind 2002

God Bless DDT chronology
← Previous —	Next → 2003

No.	Results	Stipulations	Times
1	Shoichi Ichimiya (c) defeated Ryu Echigo	Singles match for the Ironman Heavymetalweight Championship	6:22
2	Seiya Morohashi and Yoshihiro Sakai defeated Miyuki Maeda and Showa-ko	Tag team match	4:22
3	Team Karamawari (Takashi Sasaki and Thanomsak Toba) defeated Super Uchuu Power and O.K.Revolution	Singles match	12:22
4	Mikami defeated Tomohiko Hashimoto	Singles match	10:13
5	Jakai Tensho (Poison Sawada Julie, Jakai #1 and Jakai #2) defeated Hebikage, Hero! and Toguro Habukage	Six-man tag team match	10:09
6	Gentaro defeated Sanshiro Takagi (c)	Singles match for the KO-D Openweight Championship	18:41
(c) / – the champion(s) heading into the match

=== 2003 ===
God Bless DDT 2003 in Osaka
- Promotion: Dramatic Dream Team
- Date: November 30, 2003
- City: Osaka, Japan
- Venue: IMP Hall
- Attendance: 840

Event chronology
← Previous; Golden Killer 2003 in Nagoya	Next → Never Mind 2003

God Bless DDT chronology
← Previous; 2002	Next → 2004

No.	Results	Stipulations	Times
1	Viewtiful Joe and Super Uchuu Power defeated O.K.Revolution and Masahiro Takanashi	Tag team match	11:10
2	Daichi Kakimoto defeated Shuji Ishikawa	Singles match	8:06
3	Danshoku Dino won by last eliminating Macho Pump (Note: Order of entrance: Issei Fujisawa, Riki Sensyu, Danshoku Dino, Para Para Kuma-san, Yusuke Inokuma, Macho Pump, and Gorgeous Matsuno. Order of elimination: Issei Fujisawa, Riki Sensyu, Para Para Kuma-san, Gorgeous Matsuno, Yusuke Inokuma, and Macho Pump.)	Seven-man Royal Rumble for the Ironman Heavymetalweight Championship	18:44
4	Jakai Tensho (Poison Sawada Julie and Takoshi) defeated Thanomsak Toba and Yoshihiro Sakai	Tag team match	10:30
5	Sanshiro Takagi and Ebessan defeated Gibessan and KuishinBoo Kamen	Tag team match	14:33
6	Tomohiko Hashimoto and Seiya Morohashi (c) defeated Mikami and Onryo, and Kudo and Hero! (Note: Order of elimination: Kudo and Hero!, and Mikami and Onryo.)	Three-way elimination tag team match for the CMLL KO-D Tag Team Championship	13:39
(c) / – the champion(s) heading into the match

=== 2004 ===
God Bless DDT 2004
- Promotion: DDT Pro-Wrestling
- Date: November 28, 2004
- City: Osaka, Japan
- Venue: IMP Hall
- Attendance: 642

Event chronology
← Previous; Day Dream Believer 2004	Next → Never Mind 2004

God Bless DDT chronology
← Previous; 2003	Next → 2005

No.	Results	Stipulations	Times
1	Jaiant defeated Kota Ibushi	Singles match	7:20
2	Masanori Ishikura defeated Masahiro Takanashi	Singles match	7:21
3	Jako Kyodan (Poison Sawada Jumi, Yusuke Inokuma and Sentoin-ko) defeated Futoshi Miwa, Kabuki Kid and Cherry	Six-person tag team match	11:17
4	MoroToba (Seiya Morohashi and Thanomsak Toba) (c) defeated Hero! and Kudo	Only 3 Counts Sit Down match for the KO-D Tag Team Championship	17:35
5	Shoichi Ichimiya (c) defeated Danshoku Dino	Iron Man 53 Stations of the Tōkaidō Final Stage for the Ironman Heavymetalweight Championship (Note: This match began on November 17 at Nihonbashi. Footage of Ichimiya and Dino's journey to Osaka along the 53 Stations of the Tōkaidō was shown between matches. Upon their arrival, the match was concluded by a final pinfall.)	4:11
6	Sanshiro Takagi, Mikami, Riki Sensyu and Daichi Kakimoto defeated Far East Connection (Dick Togo, Tomohiko Hashimoto, Yoshiya and Sho Kanzaki)	Eight-man tag team match	16:13
(c) / – the champion(s) heading into the match

=== 2005 ===
God Bless DDT 2005 in Nagoya
- Promotion: DDT Pro-Wrestling
- Date: November 27, 2005
- City: Nagoya, Japan
- Venue: Nakamura Sports Center
- Attendance: 596

Event chronology
← Previous; Wrestling Tonkotsu 2005	Next → Never Mind 2005

God Bless DDT chronology
← Previous; 2004	Next → 2006

No.	Results	Stipulations	Times
1	Shogo Takagi defeated Masa Takanashi	Singles match	6:35
2	Shacho-ha (Shoichi Ichimiya and Futoshi Miwa) defeated Seiya Morohashi and Michael Nakazawa	Tag team match	7:49
3	Suicideboyz (Mikami and Thanomsak Toba) defeated Darkside Army (Toru Owashi and Darkside Hero!)	Tag team match	8:19
4	Daichi Kakimoto and Kota Ibushi (c) defeated Shōwa 52 Convention (Tomohiko Hashimoto and Muscle Sakai)	Tag team match for the KO-D Tag Team Championship	13:45
5	Sanshiro Takagi, Poison Sawada and Gorgeous Matsuno defeated Italian Four Horsemen (Don Maestro, Francesco Togo, Mori Bernard and Antonio Honda) (Note: Order of elimination: Gorgeous Matsuno, Mori Bernard, Poison Sawada, Don Maestro, Francesco Togo, and Antonio Honda.)	Four-on-three handicap Italian elimination match	19:18
6	Danshoku Dino and Men's Teioh defeated Shacho-ha (Riki Sensyu and Super Uchuu Power)	Tag team match	19:47
(c) / – the champion(s) heading into the match

=== 2006 ===
God Bless DDT 2006
- Promotion: DDT Pro-Wrestling
- Date: November 23, 2006
- City: Tokyo, Japan
- Venue: Shinjuku Face
- Attendance: 509

Event chronology
← Previous; Wrestling Tonkotsu 2006	Next → Never Mind 2006

God Bless DDT chronology
← Previous; 2005	Next → 2007

No.	Results	Stipulations	Times
1	Daichi Kakimoto and Tomomitsu Matsunaga defeated Kota Ibushi and Yuki Sato	Tag team match	10:58
2	American Balloon defeated Antonio Honda	Singles match	9:01
3	Jakai Tensho (Poison Sawada Julie, Mitsuya Jagai, Thanomsak Toja, Gorjas Matsuno and Yoshiaki Jago) defeated Disaster Box (Toru Owashi, Danshoku Dino, Muscle Sakai, Yusuke Inokuma and Michael Nakazawa) (Note: This match was restarted after it originally ended in a 25-second victory for Disaster Box.)	Ten-man tag team match	11:50
4	Mikami defeated Sanshiro Takagi	No disqualification match As a result, Mikami was awarded the inaugural DDT Extreme Championship.	20:22
5	Seiya Morohashi and Poco Takanashi defeated Italian Four Horsemen (Francesco Togo and Mori Bernard) (c)	Tag team match for the KO-D Tag Team Championship	20:14
6	Harashima defeated Kudo	Singles match to determine the No. 1 contender for the KO-D Openweight Championship	19:12
(c) / – the champion(s) heading into the match

=== 2007 ===
God Bless DDT 2007
- Promotion: DDT Pro-Wrestling
- Date: November 27, 2007
- City: Tokyo, Japan
- Venue: Korakuen Hall
- Attendance: 1,166

Event chronology
← Previous; Day Dream Believer 2007	Next → Never Mind 2007

God Bless DDT chronology
← Previous; 2006	Next → 2008

No.	Results	Stipulations	Times
1	Daichi Kakimoto and Masami Morohashi defeated Choun Shiryu and Rion Mizuki	Tag team match	10:52
2	Danshoku Dino (c) defeated Koo 7–6 in sudden death overtime	No-No Disqualification iron man match	10:06
3	DDT Legend Army (Sanshiro Takagi, Poison Sawada Julie and Thanomsak Toba) defeated Kota Ibushi, Kudo and Yasu Urano	Six-man tag team match	14:06
4	Takeshi Morishima defeated Muscle Sakai	Singles match	9:22
5	Snake Cyborg Nagaider, Ultraman Robin and Tappuri! Tarako Man defeated Nurunuru Brothers (Michael Nakazawa and Tomomitsu Matsunaga) and Hoshitango	M78 Galactic War Rules match	8:55
6	Aloha World Order (Prince Togo and Antonio "The Dragon" Honda) (c) vs. Metal Vampires (Toru Owashi and Seiya Morohashi) ended in a no contest	Tag team match for the KO-D Tag Team Championship	16:31
7	Harashima (c) defeated Mikami	Singles match for the KO-D Openweight Championship	18:52
(c) / – the champion(s) heading into the match

=== 2008 ===
God Bless DDT 2008
- Promotion: DDT Pro-Wrestling
- Date: November 30, 2008
- City: Tokyo, Japan
- Venue: Korakuen Hall
- Attendance: 1,071

Event chronology
← Previous; Day Dream Believer 2008	Next → Never Mind 2008

God Bless DDT chronology
← Previous; 2007	Next → 2009

No.	Results	Stipulations	Times
1	Mikami vs. Muscle Sakai ended in a draw 1–1	Two-out-of-three falls match (Note: The third fall was fought under falls count anywhere rules. The match continued outside the arena, and live footage of it was shown in between the following three matches.)	48:50
2	Seiya Morohashi and Yukihiro Abe defeated Rion Mizuki and Keita Yano	Tag team match	9:41
3	Hentai-dan (Michael Nakazawa and Hikaru Sato) vs. Poison Sawada Julie and Tomomitsu Matsunaga ended in a no contest	Tag team match	11:59
4	Italian Four Horsemen (Francesco Togo, Piza Michonoku, Antonio Honda and Sasaki & Gabbana) defeated Masa Takanashi, Kudo, Yasu Urano and Hoshitango	Eight-man tag team match	15:05
5	Mr. Gannosuke defeated Danshoku Dino	Last Gun Standing match	8:34
6	Disaster Box (Toru Owashi and Harashima) (c) defeated Sanshiro Takagi and Shuji Ishikawa	Tag team match for the CMLL KO-D Tag Team Championship	16:31
(c) / – the champion(s) heading into the match

=== 2009 ===
God Bless DDT 2009
- Promotion: DDT Pro-Wrestling
- Date: November 15, 2009
- City: Tokyo, Japan
- Venue: Shinjuku Face
- Attendance: 455

Event chronology
← Previous; Welcome to the Never Land 2009	Next → DDT Special 2009

God Bless DDT chronology
← Previous; 2008	Next → 2010

No.	Results	Stipulations	Times
1	Italian Four Horsemen (Antonio Honda and Sasaki & Gabbana) defeated Belt Hunter × Hunter (Masa Takanashi and Hikaru Sato)	Tag team match	9:23
2	Disaster Box (Harashima, Toru Owashi and Yukihiro Abe) defeated Tomomitsu Matsunaga, Tomokazu Taniguchi and Soma Takao	Six-man tag team match	10:56
3	Kota Ibushi defeated Gota Ihashi	Singles match	11:59
4	Yago Third Empire (Yoshiaki Yago and Michael Nakazawa) defeated Takagi Sanshirobinseven and Nagai Zoffy-niisan	Tag team match	9:57
5	Francesco Togo defeated Poison Sawada Julie	Singles match	8:34
6	Shuji Ishikawa won by last eliminating Thanomsak Toba (Note: Order of entrance: Kyohei, Shuji Ishikawa, Choun Shiryu, Pedro Takaishi, Hoshitango, Thanomsak Toba, and Madoka Order of elimination: Pedro Takaishi, Choun Shiryu, Kyohei, Hoshitango, Madoka, and Thanomsak Toba)	Seven-brand Royal Rumble to determine the No. 1 contender for the KO-D Openweight Championship	13:33
7	Kudo and Yasu Urano (c) defeated Belt Hunter × Hunter (Danshoku Dino and Keisuke Ishii)	Tag team match for the KO-D Tag Team Championship	20:33
(c) / – the champion(s) heading into the match

=== 2010 ===
God Bless DDT 2010
- Promotion: DDT Pro-Wrestling
- Date: November 28, 2010
- City: Tokyo, Japan
- Venue: Korakuen Hall
- Attendance: 1,525

Event chronology
← Previous; Osaka Bay Blues Special	Next → Never Mind 2010

God Bless DDT chronology
← Previous; 2009	Next → 2011

No.	Results	Stipulations	Times
1	From the Northern Country (Antonio Honda and Daisuke Sasaki) (c) defeated Granma (Gentaro and Yasu Urano)	Tag team match for the CMLL KO-D Tag Team Championship	15:52
2	Mikami, Kudo and Tatsuhiko Yoshino defeated Yukihiro Abe, Rion Mizuki and Kazuki Hirata	Six-man tag team match	8:53
3	Toru Owashi defeated DJ Nira, Danshoku Dino, Thanomsak Toba, Hoshitango, Michael Nakazawa, and Tomomitsu Matsunaga	Seven-way match	11:10
4	Genichiro Tenryu, Masao Orihara and Harashima defeated Sanshiro Takagi, Yoshiaki Yago and Shigehiro Irie	Six-man tag team match	12:58
5	Soma Takao defeated Keisuke Ishii	Final singles match in the Young Drama Cup 2010	15:10
6	Dick Togo defeated Hikaru Sato (c)	Singles match for the KO-D Openweight Championship	27:55
(c) / – the champion(s) heading into the match

=== 2011 ===
God Bless DDT 2011
- Promotion: DDT Pro-Wrestling
- Date: November 27, 2011
- City: Tokyo, Japan
- Venue: Korakuen Hall
- Attendance: 1,503

Event chronology
← Previous; Osaka Bay Blues Special 2011	Next → Never Mind 2011

God Bless DDT chronology
← Previous; 2010	Next → 2013

No.	Results	Stipulations	Times
1^{D}	Tomomitsu Matsunaga defeated Toru Sugiura	Singles match	6:13
2	Crying Wolf (Yasu Urano, Antonio Honda, Keita Yano and Yuji Hino) defeated Mikami, Masa Takanashi, Soma Takao and Daisuke Sasaki	Eight-man tag team match	12:08
3	Hikaru Sato defeated Michael Nakazawa by submission	Hard Hit rules match	6:47
4	Akito, Hiroshi Fukuda, Hikari Minami, and Gran Hamada won (Note: The other participants were Mitsuya Nagai, Tsutomu Oosugi, Hercules Senga, DJ Nira, Gundan Hitori, and Kazuki Hirata)	Homoiro Clover Z audition battle royal to determine the 5th Green Member of the stable	10:00
5	Keisuke Ishii and Shigehiro Irie (c) defeated Poison Sawada Julie and Gorgeous Matsuno	Tag team match for the KO-D Tag Team Championship; As a result, Irie also won Matsuno's Ironman Heavymetalweight Championship.	10:54
6	Kenny Omega (c) defeated Minoru Tanaka	Singles match for the World Junior Heavyweight Championship	24:26
7	Kudo (c) defeated Harashima	Singles match for the KO-D Openweight Championship	26:01
(c) / – the champion(s) heading into the match; D / – this was a dark match

=== 2013 ===
God Bless DDT 2013
- Promotion: DDT Pro-Wrestling
- Date: November 17, 2013
- City: Tokyo, Japan
- Venue: Korakuen Hall
- Attendance: 1,851

Event chronology
← Previous; Osaka Bay Blues Special 2013	Next → Never Mind 2013

God Bless DDT chronology
← Previous; 2011	Next → 2014

No.	Results	Stipulations	Times
1	Danshoku Dino, Makoto Oishi and Aja Kong defeated Sanshiro Takagi, Toru Owashi and Kazuki Hirata	Six-person tag team match to determine the No. 1 contenders for the KO-D 6-Man Tag Team Championship	9:53
2	Guanchulo won by last eliminating Hikaru Sato (Note: The other participants were (by order of elimination): Mikami, Gota Ihashi, Michael Nakazawa, Tomomitsu Matsunaga, Soma Takao, DJ Nira, Masa Takanashi, Daisuke Sasaki, and Hoshitango.)	11-man battle royal As a result, Guanchulo became the No. 1 contender for the Ironman Heavymetalweight Championship.	12:05
3	Urashimakudo (Kudo and Yasu Urano) defeated Konosuke Takeshita and Tetsuya Endo	Tag team match	11:50
4	Yukio Sakaguchi and Akito defeated Team Dream Futures (Keisuke Ishii and Shigehiro Irie)	Tag team match	11:33
5	Harashima (c) defeated Antonio Honda	Blindfold Hidden Breasts match for the DDT Extreme Championship	12:03
6	Yankee Nichokenju (Isami Kodaka and Yuko Miyamoto) defeated Golden☆Lovers (Kota Ibushi and Kenny Omega)	Tag team match for the KO-D Tag Team Championship	20:57
(c) / – the champion(s) heading into the match

=== 2014 ===
God Bless DDT 2014
- Promotion: DDT Pro-Wrestling
- Date: November 30, 2014
- City: Tokyo, Japan
- Venue: Korakuen Hall
- Attendance: 2,200

Event chronology
← Previous; Osaka Bay Blues Special 2013	Next → Never Mind 2014

God Bless DDT chronology
← Previous; 2013	Next → 2016

No.	Results	Stipulations	Times
1^{D}	Kazusada Higuchi, Ryota Nakatsu and Kouki Iwasaki defeated Tomoya Kawamura, Suguru Miyatake and Kota Umeda	Six-man tag team match	9:03
2	Serious-gun (Kudo, Yukio Sakaguchi, Mikami and Gota Ihashi) defeated Comical-gun (Antonio Honda, Michael Nakazawa, Hoshitango and DJ Nira)	Eight-man tag team match	8:28
3	Tomomitsu Matsunaga defeated Masa Takanashi and Keisuke Ishii	Three-way match to determine the No. 1 contender for the DDT Extreme Championship	7:21
4	Smile Squash (Yasu Urano and Akito) defeated Kota Ibushi and Shunma Katsumata	Hair Making match	10:10
5	Gorgeous Matsuno, Brahman Shu and Brahman Kei defeated T2Hii (Sanshiro Takagi, Toru Owashi and Kazuki Hirata) (c)	Six-man tag team match for the KO-D 6-Man Tag Team Championship	13:34
6	Shigehiro Irie defeated Daisuke Sasaki	Singles match	15:12
7	Happy Motel (Konosuke Takeshita and Tetsuya Endo) (c) defeated Makoto Oishi and X = Shiori Asahi	Tag team match for the KO-D Tag Team Championship	13:55
8	Harashima (c) defeated Soma Takao	Singles match for the KO-D Openweight Championship	20:58
(c) / – the champion(s) heading into the match; D / – this was a dark match

=== 2016 ===
God Bless DDT 2016
- Promotion: DDT Pro-Wrestling
- Date: November 23, 2016
- City: Tokyo, Japan
- Venue: Korakuen Hall
- Attendance: 1,344

Event chronology
← Previous; DDT Special 2016	Next → Osaka Octopus 2016

God Bless DDT chronology
← Previous; 2014	Next → 2017

No.	Results	Stipulations	Times
1^{D}	Mad Paulie defeated Nobuhiro Shimatani (c) and Guanchulo	Three-way match for the King of Dark Championship; As a result, Shimatani retained the title.	3:39
2	T2Hii (Sanshiro Takagi, Toru Owashi and Kazuki Hirata) defeated NωA (Makoto Oishi, Shunma Katsumata and Mao), and Smile Squash (Akito and Yasu Urano) and Rekka	Three-way match	6:05
3	Soma Takao and Kazusada Higuchi defeated Keisuke Ishii and Kouki Iwasaki	Tag team match	9:42
4	Dick Togo, Shigehiro Irie and Antonio Honda defeated Shuten Doji (Kudo and Masahiro Takanashi) and Tomomitsu Matsunaga	Six-man tag team match	11:06
5	Daisuke Sasaki defeated Mike Bailey	Singles match	14:06
6	Danshoku Dino (c) defeated Saki Akai	No Woman No Cry rules match for the DDT Extreme Championship	15:27
7	Yoshihiro Takayama defeated Yukio Sakaguchi	Singles match	10:51
8	Damnation (Shuji Ishikawa and Tetsuya Endo) defeated Harashima and Konosuke Takeshita	Tag team match	19:39
(c) / – the champion(s) heading into the match; D / – this was a dark match

=== 2017 ===
God Bless DDT 2017
- Promotion: DDT Pro-Wrestling
- Date: November 23, 2017
- City: Tokyo, Japan
- Venue: Korakuen Hall
- Attendance: 1,271

Event chronology
← Previous; DDT Special 2017	Next → Never Mind 2017

God Bless DDT chronology
← Previous; 2016	Next → 2019

No.	Results	Stipulations	Times
1^{P}	Mad Paulie defeated Daiki Shimomura	Singles match	3:04
2	Kota Umeda defeated Yuki Ueno	Singles match	5:06
3	Kazuki Hirata won by last eliminating Danshoku Dino (Note: The other participants were (by order of elimination): Tetsuya Endo, Nobuhiro Shimatani, Saki Akai, and Noriyuki Yoshida)	Infomercial Battle Royal	7:35
4	Shuten Doji (Kudo, Yukio Sakaguchi and Masahiro Takanashi) defeated Kazusada Higuchi, Kouki Iwasaki and Rekka, and NωA (Shunma Katsumata and Mao) and Diego	Three-way six-man tag team no touch rules match	6:01
5	LiLiCo, Makoto Oishi, Super Sasadango Machine, Ken Ohka and Keisuke Ishii (c) defeated YaroZ (Shiro Koshinaka, Sanshiro Takagi, Toru Owashi, Shigehiro Irie and Antonio Honda)	Ten-person tag team match for the KO-D 10-Man Tag Team Championship	8:06
6	Tetsuya Endo defeated Mike Bailey	Singles match	10:02
7	Daisuke Sasaki (c) defeated Soma Takao	No disqualification match for the DDT Extreme Championship	18:24
8	HarashiMarufuji (Harashima and Naomichi Marufuji) (c) defeated All Out (Konosuke Takeshita and Akito)	Tag team match for the KO-D Tag Team Championship	24:01
(c) / – the champion(s) heading into the match; P / – the match was broadcast on the pre-show

=== 2019 ===
God Bless DDT 2019
- Promotion: DDT Pro-Wrestling
- Date: November 24, 2019
- City: Tokyo, Japan
- Venue: Korakuen Hall
- Attendance: 1,214

Event chronology
← Previous; Ultimate Party 2019	Next → D-Oh Grand Prix 2020 in Yokohama 2 Day

God Bless DDT chronology
← Previous; 2017	Next → 2022

No.	Results	Stipulations	Times
1	Damnation (Tetsuya Endo and Mad Paulie) defeated All Out (Akito and Shunma Katsumata), Disaster Box (Yuki Ueno and Naomi Yoshimura), and Yukio Sakaguchi and Yukio Naya	Four-way tag team match	7:01
2	Kazuki Hirata (c) won by last eliminating Michiaki Nakano (Note: Order of entrance: Kazuki Hirata, Makoto Oishi, Michiaki Nakano, Mizuki Watase, Asuka, Hiroshi Yamato, and Toru Owashi Order of elimination: Mizuki Watase, Toru Owashi, Hiroshi Yamato, Makoto Oishi, Asuka, and Michiaki Nakano)	Seven-person rumble rules battle royal for the Ironman Heavymetalweight Championship	9:09
3	Danshoku Dino and Super Sasadango Machine defeated Shinya Aoki and Keigo Nakamura	Tag team match	10:45
4	Tsukasa Fujimoto defeated Saki Akai	Singles match	9:32
5	Konosuke Takeshita and Jiro "Ikemen" Kuroshio defeated Antonio Honda and Miyu Yamashita	Tag team match	14:07
6	Damnation (Daisuke Sasaki and Soma Takao) (c) defeated Calamari Drunken Kings (Masahiro Takanashi and Chris Brookes)	Tag team match for the KO-D Tag Team Championship	13:43
7	Harashima (c) defeated Yuki Iino	Singles match for the KO-D Openweight Championship	16:51
(c) / – the champion(s) heading into the match

=== 2022 ===
God Bless DDT 2022
- Promotion: CyberFight
- Brand: DDT Pro-Wrestling
- Date: October 23, 2022
- City: Tokyo, Japan
- Venue: Korakuen Hall
- Attendance: 701

Event chronology
← Previous; Get Alive 2022	Next → D-Oh Grand Prix 2022

God Bless DDT chronology
← Previous; 2019	Next → 2023

No.	Results	Stipulations	Times
1^{P}	Pheromones (Yuki "Sexy" Iino and Danshoku "Dandy" Dino) (with Yumehito "Fantastic" Imanari) defeated Takagi-gun (Sanshiro Takagi, Toru Owashi, Makoto Oishi, Antonio Honda and Akito)	Dissolution Contra President For a Day two-on-five handicap match As a result, Iino was appointed as CyberFight president for a single day.	7:39
2	Kazuki Hirata defeated Kazuma Sumi	Singles match	8:48
3	Damnation T.A. (Daisuke Sasaki, Minoru Fujita, MJ Paul and Kanon) defeated The37Kamiina (Shunma Katsumata and Toui Kojima) and Eruption (Saki Akai and Hideki Okatani)	Eight-person tag team match	12:08
4	Soma Takao and Hikaru Machida defeated Harashima and Takeshi Masada	Tag team match	10:56
5	Burning (Jun Akiyama, Yusuke Okada and Yuya Koroku) defeated Osamu Nishimura, Shinichiro Kawamatsu and Yuki Ishida	Six-man tag team match	10:39
6	Naomi Yoshimura, Yuji Hino and Chris Brookes defeated Tetsuya Endo, Mao and Yukio Naya	Six-man tag team match	15:22
7	Yuki Ueno (c) defeated Koju "Shining Ball" Takeda	Singles match for the DDT Universal Championship	15:24
8	Kazusada Higuchi (c) defeated Yukio Sakaguchi	Singles match for the KO-D Openweight Championship	16:12
(c) / – the champion(s) heading into the match; P / – the match was broadcast on the pre-show

=== 2023 ===
God Bless DDT 2023
- Promotion: CyberFight
- Brand: DDT Pro-Wrestling
- Date: October 22, 2023
- City: Tokyo, Japan
- Venue: Korakuen Hall
- Attendance: 800

Event chronology
← Previous; Who's Gonna Top? 2023	Next → Ultimate Party 2023

God Bless DDT chronology
← Previous; 2022	Next → 2024

No.	Results	Stipulations	Times
1^{P}	Masahiro Takanashi and Antonio Honda defeated Soma Takao and Yuni	Tag team match	7:53
2	Mikami defeated Kazuma Sumi	Singles match	5:57
3	Damnation T.A. (Daisuke Sasaki, Kanon and MJ Paul) defeated Tetsuya Endo, Toui Kojima and Rukiya	Six-man tag team match	9:25
4	Yuya Koroku vs. Yukio Naya ended in a no contest	Singles match	5:17
5	Jun Akiyama, Danshoku Dino and Makoto Oishi defeated Kazusada Higuchi, Akito and Yusuke Okada	Six-man tag team match	7:52
6	Eruption (Yukio Sakaguchi and Hideki Okatani) defeated Saki Akai and Chihiro Hashimoto	Tag team match	12:19
7	Kazuki Hirata (Extreme) defeated Takeshi Masada (Ironman) by countout	Let's All Enjoy a Fun and Delightful Deathmatch for the DDT Extreme Championship and the Ironman Heavymetalweight Championship; As a result of the countout, Masada retained his title.	15:27
8	Chris Brookes and Harashima defeated The37Kamiina (Yuki Ueno and Mao)	Tag team match	22:11
P / – the match was broadcast on the pre-show

=== 2024 ===
The 2024 edition of God Bless DDT was held on October 20 at the Korakuen Hall. In the main event, Shinya Aoki defended the KO-D Openweight Championship against Harashima.
