= Never Mind 2021 =

2021 DDT Pro-Wrestling event

- Promotional poster featuring various wrestlers
- Promotion: CyberFight
- Brand: DDT
- Date: December 26, 2021
- City: Tokyo, Japan
- Venue: Yoyogi National Gymnasium
- Attendance: 1,234

Pay-per-view chronology
← Previous; Peter Pan 2021	Next → Judgment 2022

Never Mind chronology
← Previous; 2017	Next → 2022

Never Mind 2021 in Yoyogi was a professional wrestling event promoted by CyberFight's sub-brand DDT Pro-Wrestling (DDT). It took place on December 26, 2021, in Tokyo, Japan, at the Yoyogi National Gymnasium. The event aired on CyberAgent's AbemaTV online linear television service and CyberFight's streaming service Wrestle Universe. It was the eighteenth event in the Never Mind series.

Eleven matches were contested at the event, including three on the pre-show, and four of DDT's championships were on the line. The main event saw Konosuke Takeshita defeat Yuji Okabayashi to retain the KO-D Openweight Championship. Other prominent matches included Disaster Box (Harashima and Naomi Yoshimura) successfully defending the KO-D Tag Team Championship against The Bodyguard and Yuji Hino, and Daisuke Sasaki defeated Masahiro Takanashi to retain the DDT Universal Championship.

== Production ==
=== Background ===
Since 2001, DDT began producing their year-end shows under the branch of "Never Mind". The events' traditional venue was initially the Korakuen Hall, but during the years, the promotion moved the events to other arenas. These events conclude certain feuds and rivalries built during the year. Between 2017 and 2021, the Never Mind series were briefly replaced by the DDT Ultimate Party as the promotion's year-closing events.

=== Storylines ===
The event featured eleven professional wrestling matches that resulted from scripted storylines, where wrestlers portrayed villains, heroes, or less distinguishable characters in the scripted events that built tension and culminated in a wrestling match or series of matches.

=== Event ===
The show portraited three title matches, with all of them coming off with the champions retaining their respective titles. The first one saw Damnation T.A.'s leader Daisuke Sasaki scoring the third defense of the DDT Universal Championship against Masahiro Takanashi. Next, the team of Harashima and Naomi Yoshimura securing their first defense of the KO-D Tag Team Championship against The Bodyguard and Yuji Hino. The main event portraited the confrontation between Konosuke Takeshita and Big Japan Pro Wrestling's Yuji Okabayashi which solded with the victory of The 37Kamiina's leader who scored the second defense of the KO-D Openweight Championship.

== Results ==
No.	Results	Stipulations	Times
1^{P}	Toru Owashi and Yukio Naya defeated Antonio Honda and Hideki Okatani	Tag team match	6:17
2^{P}	Van Vert Jack defeated Ilusion	Singles match	9:08
3^{P}	Sanshiro Takagi defeated Maku Donaruto	Singles match	7:54
4	Romance Dawn (Shota and Soma Takao) defeated Akito and Yuki Ishida	Tag team match	8:35
5	Pheromones (Danshoku "Dandy" Dino, Yuki "Sexy" Iino and Yumehito "Fantastic" Imanari) defeated Shinya Aoki, Super Sasadango Machine and Yumiko Hotta	Six-man tag team match for the KO-D 6-Man Tag Team Championship	9:57
6	Shuji Kondo defeated Kazuki Hirata	Singles match	9:40
7	Chris Brookes, Maki Itoh and Minoru Suzuki defeated Eruption (Kazusada Higuchi, Saki Akai and Yukio Sakaguchi)	Mixed tag team match	20:38
8	Burning (Jun Akiyama, Tetsuya Endo, Yusuke Okada and Yuya Koroku) defeated The 37Kamiina (Mao, Shunma Katsumata, Toui Kojima and Yuki Ueno)	Eight-man tag team match	16:30
9	Daisuke Sasaki (c) defeated Masahiro Takanashi	Singles match for the DDT Universal Championship	17:48
10	Disaster Box (Harashima and Naomi Yoshimura) (c) defeated The Bodyguard and Yuji Hino	Tag team match for the KO-D Tag Team Championship	18:17
11	Konosuke Takeshita (c) defeated Yuji Okabayashi	Singles match for the KO-D Openweight Championship	37:17
(c) / – the champion(s) heading into the match; P / – the match was broadcast on the pre-show
