= DDT Never Mind =

Never Mind
- Promotions: DDT Pro-Wrestling (2000–2017); CyberFight (2021–2024)
- Brand(s): DDT Pro-Wrestling (2021–2024)
- First event: Never Mind
- Last event: Never Mind 2024

Never Mind was a recurring professional wrestling event held annually by DDT Pro-Wrestling (DDT) in December in the Tokyo Dome City. Originally held by DDT as an independent promotion from 2000 to 2017, it was brought back by CyberFight for three editions held as DDT-branded events in 2021, 2022 and 2024, with the 2021 edition being held in the Yoyogi National Stadium.

== History ==
From 2000 to 2017, Never Mind was produced by DDT Pro-Wrestling, an independent promotion founded in 1997 by Shintaro Muto and Pro Wrestling Crusaders alumni Kyohei Mikami, Kazushige Nosawa and Sanshiro Takagi. In 2020, DDT and its subsidiaries merged with Pro Wrestling Noah into a new company called CyberFight owned by the digital advertising company CyberAgent, with DDT and Noah persisting as separate brands under the CyberFight umbrella. Never Mind was then held in 2021, 2022 and 2024 as a DDT-branded event.

== Events ==
#	Event	Date	City	Venue	Main event	Ref.
1	Never Mind	December 14, 2000	Tokyo, Japan	Korakuen Geopolis	Poison Sawada Julie (c) vs. Super Uchuu Power vs. Tomohiko Hashimoto vs. Sanshiro Takagi in a four-way elimination match for the KO-D Openweight Championship	
2	Never Mind 2001	December 12, 2001	Tokyo, Japan	Korakuen Geopolis	Sanshiro Takagi vs. Sanshiro Takagi in a Loser Forfeits His Ring Name lumberjack match	
3	Never Mind 2002	December 22, 2002	Tokyo, Japan	Korakuen Hall	Gentaro (c) vs. Mikami vs. Sanshiro Takagi vs. Tomohiko Hashimoto in a four-way elimination match for the KO-D Openweight Championship	
4	Never Mind 2003	December 29, 2003	Tokyo, Japan	Korakuen Hall	Tomohiko Hashimoto and Seiya Morohashi (c) vs. Mikami and Onryo vs. Hero! and Kudo in a three-way TLC tornado tag team match for the CMLL KO-D Tag Team Championship	
5	Never Mind 2004	December 25, 2004	Tokyo, Japan	Korakuen Hall	DDT (Sanshiro Takagi, Mikami, Ryuji Ito, Riki Senshu and Daichi Kakimoto) vs. FEC (Dick Togo, Taka Michinoku, Tomohiko Hashimoto, Yoshiya and Sho Kanzaki) in a five-on-five elimination rumble	
4	Never Mind 2005	December 28, 2005	Tokyo, Japan	Korakuen Hall	Danshoku Dino (c) vs. Sanshiro Takagi vs. Super Uchuu Power vs. Francesco Togo vs. Toru Owashi in a five-way ladder match for the KO-D Openweight Championship	
7	Never Mind 2006	December 29, 2006	Tokyo, Japan	Korakuen Hall	Toru Owashi (c) vs. Harashima for the KO-D Openweight Championship	
8	Never Mind 2007	December 30, 2007	Tokyo, Japan	Korakuen Hall	Harashima vs. Kota Ibushi	
9	Never Mind 2008	December 28, 2008	Tokyo, Japan	Korakuen Hall	Sanshiro Takagi (c) vs. Harashima for the KO-D Openweight Championship	
10	Never Mind 2009	December 27, 2009	Tokyo, Japan	Korakuen Hall	Shuji Ishikawa (c) vs. Harashima for the KO-D Openweight Championship	
11	Never Mind 2010	December 26, 2010	Tokyo, Japan	Korakuen Hall	Gentaro vs. Antonio Honda for the interim KO-D Openweight Championship	
12	Never Mind 2011	December 31, 2011	Tokyo, Japan	Korakuen Hall	Kudo (c) vs. Mikami for the KO-D Openweight Championship	
13	Never Mind 2012	December 23, 2012	Tokyo, Japan	Korakuen Hall	El Generico (c) vs. Kenny Omega for the KO-D Openweight Championship	
14	Never Mind 2013	December 23, 2013	Tokyo, Japan	Korakuen Hall	Harashima (c) vs. Yukio Sakaguchi for the KO-D Openweight Championship	
15	Never Mind 2014	December 23, 2014	Tokyo, Japan	Korakuen Hall	Harashima (c) vs. Shigehiro Irie for the KO-D Openweight Championship	
16	Never Mind 2015	December 23, 2015	Tokyo, Japan	Korakuen Hall	Happy Motel (Konosuke Takeshita and Tetsuya Endo) vs. Yuji Okabayashi and Shigehiro Irie for the vacant KO-D Tag Team Championship	
17	Never Mind 2016	December 25, 2016	Tokyo, Japan	Korakuen Hall	Harashima (c) vs. Shigehiro Irie for the KO-D Openweight Championship	
18	Never Mind 2017	December 24, 2017	Tokyo, Japan	Korakuen Hall	Konosuke Takeshita (c) vs. Colt Cabana for the KO-D Openweight Championship	
19	Never Mind 2021 in Yoyogi	December 26, 2021	Tokyo, Japan	Yoyogi National Stadium 2nd Gymnasium	Konosuke Takeshita (c) vs. Yuji Okabayashi for the KO-D Openweight Championship	
20	Never Mind 2022	December 29, 2022	Tokyo, Japan	Tokyo Dome City Hall	Kazusada Higuchi (c) vs. Yuki Ueno for the KO-D Openweight Championship	
21	Never Mind 2024	December 22, 2024	Tokyo, Japan	Korakuen Hall	Damnation T.A. (Daisuke Sasaki and Kanon) vs. Calamari Drunken Kings (Chris Brookes and Masahiro Takanashi)	
(c) – refers to the champion(s) heading into the match

== Results ==
=== 2000 ===
Never Mind
- Promotion: Dramatic Dream Team
- Date: December 22, 2002
- City: Tokyo, Japan
- Venue: Korakuen Geopolis
- Attendance: 1,021

Event chronology
← Previous; DDT Heaven's Night	Next → Who Is Mr. y2D?

Never Mind chronology
← Previous —	Next → 2001

No.	Results	Stipulations	Times
1	Gentaro defeated Kengo Takai	Singles match	10:49
2	Chotaro Kamoi won by last defeating Toshiyuki Moriya (Note: The other participants were Issei Fujisawa, Nagase Kancho, Jigoku Soldier, Naoshi Sano, Shigeo Kato, Fushicho Karasu, Misae-chan)	15-minute Ironman Battle Royal for the Ironman Heavymetalweight Championship	15:00
3	Exciting Yoshida, Showa and Mitsunobu Kikuzawa defeated Jakai Tensho (Hebikage and Butamamushi) (with Jakaibo Hebider)	Three-on-two handicap match	12:59
4	Takashi Sasaki and Yuki Nishino defeated Suicideboyz (Mikami and Thanomsak Toba)	Tag team match	12:43
5	Sanshiro Takagi defeated Poison Sawada Julie (c), Super Uchuu Power, and Tomohiko Hashimoto (Note: Order of elimination: Tomohiko Hashimoto, Super Uchuu Power, and Poison Sawada Julie.)	Four-way elimination match for the KO-D Openweight Championship	23:25
(c) / – the champion(s) heading into the match

=== 2001 ===
Never Mind 2001
- Promotion: Dramatic Dream Team
- Date: December 12, 2001
- City: Tokyo, Japan
- Venue: Korakuen Geopolis
- Attendance: 908

Event chronology
← Previous; Wrestling Tonkotsu in Fukuoka Dome	Next → Dark Horse 2002

Never Mind chronology
← Previous; 2000	Next → 2002

No.	Results	Stipulations	Times
1	Hebikage defeated Asian Cooga (c), Hero!, Konicaman #2, Fushicho Karasu, and Showa (with Showa-ko)	6-fold thread match for the Ironman Heavymetalweight Championship	5:49
2	President Miwa defeated Futoshi Miwa	Singles match	6:09
3	Jason the Terrible, Thanomsak Toba and Tomohiko Hashimoto defeated Tomohiro Ishii, Shigeo Kato and Issei Fujisawa	Six-man tag team match	12:57
4	Super Uchuu Power (c) defeated Poison Sawada Julie	Singles match for the KO-D Openweight Championship	16:43
5	Mikami and Takashi Sasaki defeated X-RAB (Gentaro and Yoshiya) (c)	Tag team match for the KO-D Tag Team Championship	19:02
6	Sanshiro Takagi defeated Sanshiro Takagi (Note: Shoichi Ichimiya wrestled under the name Sanshiro Takagi (高偽三四郎, Takagi Sanshirō), written with gi (偽, fake).)	Loser Forfeits His Ring Name lumberjack match	14:39
(c) / – the champion(s) heading into the match

=== 2002 ===
Never Mind 2002
- Promotion: Dramatic Dream Team
- Date: December 22, 2002
- City: Tokyo, Japan
- Venue: Korakuen Hall
- Attendance: 1,371

Event chronology
← Previous; God Bless DDT	Next → The First Dream 2003

Never Mind chronology
← Previous; 2001	Next → 2003

No.	Results	Stipulations	Times
1	Takashi Sasaki and Yuki Nishino defeated MoroToba (Thanomsak Toba and Seiya Morohashi)	Tag team match	10:13
2	Yuki Miyazaki and Kaori Yoneyama defeated Miyuki Maeda and Showa-ko	Tag team match	8:44
3	Super Uchuu Power defeated O.K.Revolution	Singles match	7:44
4	Hero! and Toguro Habukage defeated Jakai #1 and Jakai #3	Tag team match	5:12
5	Poison Sawada Julie defeated Hebikage	Singles match	8:30
6	Shoichi Ichimiya (c) defeated Yoshihiro Sakai	Ironman Saves the Earth 24-Hour Marathon match for the Ironman Heavymetalweight Championship (Note: This match began the previous day at noon in Hakone. Footage of Ichimiya's journey to Korakuen, during which he defended, lost, and regained the title several times, was shown between matches. Upon his arrival, he was challenged by Sakai, and successfully defended the title to end the match.)	1:54
7	Mikami defeated Gentaro (c), Sanshiro Takagi, and Tomohiko Hashimoto (Note: Order of elimination: Tomohiko Hashimoto, Gentaro, and Sanshiro Takagi.)	Four-way elimination match for the KO-D Openweight Championship	16:22
(c) / – the champion(s) heading into the match

=== 2003 ===
Never Mind 2003
- Promotion: Dramatic Dream Team
- Date: December 30, 2003
- City: Tokyo, Japan
- Venue: Korakuen Hall
- Attendance: 2,003

Event chronology
← Previous; God Bless DDT 2003 in Osaka	Next → Hatsuyume 2004

Never Mind chronology
← Previous; 2002	Next → 2004

No.	Results	Stipulations	Times
1	Super Uchuu Power, Masahiro Takanashi and Yuki Miyazaki defeated Daichi Kakimoto, Showa and Showa-ko	Six-person tag team match	14:05
2	Shoichi Ichimiya and Danshoku Dino defeated O.K.Revolution and Yoshihiro Sakai	Tag team match As a result, Dino won O.K.Revolution's Ironman Heavymetalweight Championship.	13:01
3	Koichiro Kimura and Yoji Anjo defeated Issei Fujisawa and Shuji Ishikawa	Tag team match	9:50
4	Sanshiro Takagi, Thanomsak Toba and Gentaro defeated Jakai Tensho (Poison Sawada Julie, Takoshi and Yusuke Inokuma)	Six-man tag team match	17:21
5	Hero! and Kudo defeated Tomohiko Hashimoto and Seiya Morohashi (c), and Mikami and Onryo	Three-way TLC tornado tag team match for the CMLL KO-D Tag Team Championship	19:00
(c) / – the champion(s) heading into the match

=== 2004 ===
Never Mind 2004
- Promotion: DDT Pro-Wrestling
- Date: December 25, 2004
- City: Tokyo, Japan
- Venue: Korakuen Hall
- Attendance: 2,004

Event chronology
← Previous; God Bless DDT 2004	Next → Into The Fight 2005

Never Mind chronology
← Previous; 2003	Next → 2005

No.	Results	Stipulations	Times
1	Kota Ibushi defeated Jaiant	Singles match	10:26
2	Kenshin, Futoshi Miwa and Cherry defeated Masahiro Takanashi, Mineo Fujita and Fuka	Six-person tag team match	7:22
3	Danshoku Dino defeated Inokuma Sentokuin	Singles match	12:12
4	MoroToba (Seiya Morohashi and Thanomsak Toba) (c) defeated Hero! and Kudo, and Jako Kyodan (Poison Sawada Julie and Sentokuin-ko)	Three-way Champagne De Smatch for the KO-D Tag Team Championship	9:56
5	Yacchan defeated Shoichi Ichimiya (c) by decision (2–0)	Singles match for the Ironman Heavymetalweight Championship (Note: This match was scheduled for one round of three minutes; Yacchan was a Japanese macaque.)	3:00
6	DDT (Sanshiro Takagi, Mikami, Ryuji Ito, Riki Senshu and Daichi Kakimoto) defeated FEC (Dick Togo, Taka Michinoku, Tomohiko Hashimoto, Yoshiya and Sho Kanzaki) (Note: Order of entrance: Taka Michinoku, Riki Senshu, Yoshiya, Daichi Kakimoto, Sho Kanzaki, Sanshiro Takagi, Ryuji Ito, Tomohiko Hashimoto, and Mikami. Order of elimination: Shho Kanzaki, Daichi Kakimoto, Taka Michinoku, Ryuji Ito, Yoshiya, Sanshiro Takagi, Riki Senshu, Tomohiko Hashimoto, and Dick Togo.)	Five-on-five elimination rumble	37:55
(c) / – the champion(s) heading into the match

=== 2005 ===
Never Mind 2005
- Promotion: DDT Pro-Wrestling
- Date: December 28, 2005
- City: Tokyo, Japan
- Venue: Korakuen Hall
- Attendance: 1,509

Event chronology
← Previous; God Bless DDT 2005 in Nagoya	Next → Hatsuyume 2006

Never Mind chronology
← Previous; 2004	Next → 2006

No.	Results	Stipulations	Times
1	Antonio Honda defeated Riki Senshu	Singles match	5:04
2	Mad Man Pondo, Yusuke Inokuma and Masa Takanashi defeated Tomohiko Hashimoto, Muscle Sakai and "Black Angel" Jaki Numazawa	Six-man tag team death match	13:01
3	Seiya Morohashi defeated Michael Nakazawa	Singles match	5:45
4	Shogo Takagi and Darkside Hero! defeated Italian Four Horsemen (Don Maestro and Mori Bernard), and Poison Sawada and Gorgeous Matsuno	Three-way tag team match	5:55
5	Shoichi Ichimiya defeated Ken Ohka, and Futoshi Miwa	Illegal Building Seismic Strength Fraud three-way deathmatch to determine the successor to the Shoichi Ichimiya name This was Shoichi Ichimiya's retirement match.	10:17
6	Daichi Kakimoto and Kota Ibushi (c) defeated Suicideboyz (Mikami and Thanomsak Toba)	Tag team match for the KO-D Tag Team Championship	18:10
7	Danshoku Dino (c) defeated Super Uchuu Power, Francesco Togo, Toru Owashi, and Sanshiro Takagi	Five-way ladder match for the KO-D Openweight Championship	20:04
(c) / – the champion(s) heading into the match

=== 2006 ===
Never Mind 2006
- Promotion: DDT Pro-Wrestling
- Date: December 29, 2006
- City: Tokyo, Japan
- Venue: Korakuen Hall
- Attendance: 2,006

Event chronology
← Previous; God Bless DDT 2006	Next → Dramatic Rumble 2007

Never Mind chronology
← Previous; 2005	Next → 2007

No.	Results	Stipulations	Times
1	Shin Jakai Tensho (Poison Sawada Julie, Majami and Bear Fukuja) defeated Seiya Morohashi, Masa Takanashi and Choun Shiryu (with Makoto)	Six-man tag team match	8:24
2	Gorgeous Matsuno defeated Yusuke Inokuma, Muscle Sakai, and Danshoku Dino	Falls Count Anywhere No Disqualification four-way match	13:42
3	Mikami (c) defeated Thanomsak Toba	Singles match for the DDT Extreme Championship (Note: This match was scheduled for five rounds of three minutes.)	4R 1:19
4	Hoshitango and Daichi Kakimoto defeated American Balloon and Michael Nakazawa	Tag team match	12:20
5	Italian Four Horsemen (Francesco Togo, Antonio Honda and Italian Warrior) defeated Kudo, Kota Ibushi and Tomomitsu Matsunaga	Six-man tag team match	16:46
6	Harashima defeated Toru Owashi (c)	Singles match for the KO-D Openweight Championship	18:04
(c) / – the champion(s) heading into the match

=== 2007 ===
Never Mind 2007
- Promotion: DDT Pro-Wrestling
- Date: December 30, 2007
- City: Tokyo, Japan
- Venue: Korakuen Hall
- Attendance: 2,007

Event chronology
← Previous; God Bless DDT 2007	Next → Into The Fight 2008

Never Mind chronology
← Previous; 2006	Next → 2008

No.	Results	Stipulations	Times
1^{D}	Sanshiro Takagi defeated Ken Ohka	Sanshiro Takagi Victims Weapon Rumble; As a result, Takagi won Ohka's Ironman Heavymetalweight Championship.	—
2	Kudo and Yasu Urano defeated Choun Shiryu and Daisuke Sasaki	Tag team match	12:13
3	DDT Legend Army (Takashi Sasaki, Poison Sawada Julie and Thanomsak Toba) defeated Muscle Sakai, Daichi Kakimoto and Masa Takanashi	Six-man tag team match	12:12
4	Tomomitsu Matsunaga defeated Danshoku Dino, The Count, Michael Nakazawa, Hoshitango, and Rion Mizuki	Golden Lotion Ladder match	11:54
5	Metal Vampire (Dick Togo, Toru Owashi and Seiya Morohashi) defeated Aloha World Order (Koo and Antonio Honda) and Masami Morohashi	Six-man tag team match	16:12
6	Harashima defeated Kota Ibushi	Singles match	21:47
D / – this was a dark match

=== 2008 ===
Never Mind 2008
- Promotion: DDT Pro-Wrestling
- Date: December 28, 2008
- City: Tokyo, Japan
- Venue: Korakuen Hall
- Attendance: 2,008

Event chronology
← Previous; God Bless DDT 2008	Next → Dramatic 2009 Special

Never Mind chronology
← Previous; 2007	Next → 2009

No.	Results	Stipulations	Times
1^{D}	Kazuhiro Tamura won by last eliminating Madoka (Note: Order of entrance: DJ Nira, Makoto, Hercules Senga, Madoka, Kazuhiro Tamura, Tsutomu Oosugi, and Ricky Fuji. Order of elimination: Makoto, Hercules Senga, Ricky Fuji, Tsutomu Oosugi, DJ Nira, and Madoka.)	Seven-person DDT Semi-Regu-Rumble for a mid-career recruitment in DDT	9:39
2	Yasu Urano defeated Yukihiro Abe	Singles match	8:37
3	Seiya Morohashi defeated Poison Sawada Julie	Singles match	12:12
4	Rion Mizuki, Hikaru Sato, Toru Owashi, and Cherry won (Note: The other participants were Danshoku Dino and Michael Nakazawa.)	Losers Must Marry six-way dance As a result, Dino and Nakazawa had to marry within three months.	10:00
5	Aka-Rangers (Takashi Sasaki and Gentaro) defeated Suicideboyz (Mikami and Thanomsak Toba)	Tag team match	16:01
6	Four Italian Horsemen (Antonio Honda [C], Francesco Togo, Piza Michinoku and Sasaki & Gabbana) defeated Rebel Army (Masa Takanashi [C], Kudo, Hoshitango and Tomomitsu Matsunaga) (Note: Order of elimination: Hoshitango, Piza Michinoku, Francesco Togo, Tomomitsu Matsunaga, Sasaki & Gabbana, Kudo, and Masa Takanashi.)	Loser Leaves Town Captain's Fall elimination eight-man tag team match As a result, Takanashi was exiled from DDT.	16:19
7	Sanshiro Takagi (c) defeated Harashima	Singles match for the KO-D Openweight Championship	18:11
(c) / – the champion(s) heading into the match; D / – this was a dark match

=== 2009 ===
Never Mind 2009
- Promotion: DDT Pro-Wrestling
- Date: December 27, 2009
- City: Tokyo, Japan
- Venue: Korakuen Hall
- Attendance: 2,009

Event chronology
← Previous; God Bless DDT 2009	Next → Dramatic 2010 January Special

Never Mind chronology
← Previous; 2008	Next → 2010

No.	Results	Stipulations	Times
1	Tomomitsu Matsunaga, Rion Mizuki and Soma Takao defeated Yukihiro Abe, Gota Ihashi and Tomokazu Taniguchi	Six-man tag team match	9:13
2	Kudo, Yasu Urano, Poison Sawada Julie and Suicideboyz (Mikami and Thanomsak Toba) defeated Michael "CEO" Nakazawa and Belt Hunter×Hunter (Danshoku Dino, Hikaru Sato, Masa Takanashi and Keisuke Ishii) 2–1	Loser Assortment ten-man tag team three falls match	10:16
3	Toru Owashi defeated Hoshitango	Singles match	10:53
4	Four Italian Horsemen (Francesco Togo and Antonio Honda) defeated Four Italian Horsemen (Piza Michinoku and Sasaki & Gabbana)	Tag team match	16:02
5	Sanshiro Takagi and Munenori Sawa defeated Golden☆Lovers (Kota Ibushi and Kenny Omega)	Tag team match	17:07
6	Shuji Ishikawa (c) defeated Harashima	Singles match for the KO-D Openweight Championship	21:57
(c) / – the champion(s) heading into the match

=== 2010 ===
Never Mind 2010
- Promotion: DDT Pro-Wrestling
- Date: December 26, 2010
- City: Tokyo, Japan
- Venue: Korakuen Hall
- Attendance: 2,010

Event chronology
← Previous; God Bless DDT 2010	Next → Sweet Dreams! 2011

Never Mind chronology
← Previous; 2009	Next → 2011

No.	Results	Stipulations	Times
1	Yasu Urano, Hoshitango and Rion Mizuki defeated Kudo, Keisuke Ishii and Kazuki Hirata	Six-man tag team match	8:09
2	Disaster Box (Harashima, Toru Owashi and Yukihiro Abe) defeated Shit Heart♥Foundation (Hikaru Sato, Michael Nakazawa and Tomomitsu Matsunaga) (c)	Six-man tag team match for the UWA World Trios Championship	11:41
3	Mikami and Onryo defeated Thanomsak Toba and Mitsuya Nagai	Tag team match to determine the No. 1 contenders to the KO-D Tag Team Championship	10:40
4	Soma Takao defeated Daisuke Sasaki	Loser Eats Dog Food match	9:02
5	Danshoku Dino vs. Makoto Oishi ended in a no contest	Singles match	9:08
6	Golden☆Lovers (Kota Ibushi and Kenny Omega) (c) defeated Jado and Gedo	Tag team match for the IWGP Junior Heavyweight Tag Team Championship	21:24
7	Antonio Honda defeated Gentaro	Singles match for the interim KO-D Openweight Championship	25:10
(c) / – the champion(s) heading into the match

=== 2011 ===
Never Mind 2011
- Promotion: DDT Pro-Wrestling
- Date: December 31, 2011
- City: Tokyo, Japan
- Venue: Korakuen Hall
- Attendance: 2,011

Event chronology
← Previous; God Bless DDT 2011	Next → Sweet Dreams! 2012

Never Mind chronology
← Previous; 2010	Next → 2012

No.	Results	Stipulations	Times
1^{D}	Rion Mizuki defeated Shota	Singles match	6:57
2	Masa Takanashi and Daisuke Sasaki defeated Kenny Omega and DJ Nira	Tag team match	11:21
3	Crying Wolf (Antonio Honda and Keita Yano) defeated Hikaru Sato and Michael Nakazawa	Tag team match	10:31
4	Tomomitsu Matsunaga defeated Kazuki Hirata	Singles match	4:17
5	Crying Wolf (Yasu Urano and Yuji Hino) defeated Keisuke Ishii and Shigehiro Irie (c)	Tag team match for the KO-D Tag Team Championship	13:48
6	Kensuke Office (Katsuhiko Nakajima and Satoshi Kajiwara) defeated Harashima and Soma Takao	Tag team match	15:08
7	Homoiro Clover Z (Danshoku Dino, Makoto Oishi, Gran Hamada, Akito and Hiroshi Fukuda) (with Hikari Minami) defeated The 48 Group Alliance (Sanshiro Takagi, Vladimir Nagai, Ivan Markov, Poison Julie Sawada and Hoshitango) (with Bonnie) (Note: Order of elimination: Hiroshi Fukuda, Vladimir Nagai, Gran Hamada, Ivan Markov, Akito, Hoshitango, Poison Julie Sawada, Danshoku Dino, and Sanshiro Takagi. Sole survivor: Makoto Oishi.)	Ten-man elimination tag team match	12:08
8	Kudo (c) defeated Mikami	Singles match for the KO-D Openweight Championship	22:50
(c) / – the champion(s) heading into the match; D / – this was a dark match

=== 2012 ===
Never Mind 2012
- Promotion: DDT Pro-Wrestling
- Date: December 23, 2012
- City: Tokyo, Japan
- Venue: Korakuen Hall
- Attendance: 2,012

Event chronology
← Previous; Jakai Tensho Final: Poison Sawada Julie Forever	Next → Sweet Dreams! 2013

Never Mind chronology
← Previous; 2011	Next → 2013

No.	Results	Stipulations	Times
1^{D}	Tetsuya Endo defeated DJ Nira	Singles match	0:05
2	Team Dream Futures (Soma Takao and Shigehiro Irie) defeated Danshoku Dino and Makoto Oishi	Tag team match	10:36
3	Mikami and Gorgeous Matsuno defeated Nurunuru Brothers (Tomomitsu Matsunaga and Michael Nakazawa), Hikaru Sato and Masa Takanashi, and Yukio Sakaguchi and Akito	Four-way tag team match	8:32
4	Harashima and Hiroo Tsumaki defeated Golden☆Rendez-Vous (Kota Ibushi and Gota Ihashi)	Tag team match	15:02
5	Sanshiro Takagi and Tencozy (Hiroyoshi Tenzan and Satoshi Kojima) defeated Monster Army (Antonio Honda, Yuji Hino, Hoshitango and Daisuke Sasaki)	Four-on-three handicap match	11:09
6	Keisuke Ishii (c) defeated Yasu Urano, and Isami Kodaka	Three-way match for the DDT Extreme Championship	12:18
7	Kenny Omega defeated El Generico (c)	Singles match for the KO-D Openweight Championship	24:17
(c) / – the champion(s) heading into the match; D / – this was a dark match

=== 2013 ===
Never Mind 2013
- Promotion: DDT Pro-Wrestling
- Date: December 23, 2013
- City: Tokyo, Japan
- Venue: Korakuen Hall
- Attendance: 2,013

Event chronology
← Previous; God Bless DDT 2013	Next → Sweet Dreams! 2014

Never Mind chronology
← Previous; 2012	Next → 2014

No.	Results	Stipulations	Times
1^{D}	Tomomitsu Matsunaga defeated Kazuki Hirata	Singles match First match in Hirata's five-match trial series	1:44
2^{D}	Kazuki Hirata defeated Gota Ihashi	Singles match Second match in Hirata's five-match trial series	1:26
3^{D}	Guanchulo defeated Kazuki Hirata	Singles match Third match in Hirata's five-match trial series	1:06
4^{D}	Kazuki Hirata defeated Choun Shiryu	Singles match Fourth match in Hirata's five-match trial series	1:46
5^{D}	Jun Kasai defeated Kazuki Hirata	Singles match Final match in Hirata's five-match trial series	4:13
6	Team Dream Futures (Keisuke Ishii, Shigehiro Irie and Soma Takao) defeated Mikami, Masa Takanashi and Akito	Six-man tag team match	8:15
7	Hikaru Sato defeated Michael Nakazawa	Singles match	4:39
8	Urashimakudo (Kudo and Yasu Urano) and Saki Akai defeated Monster Army (Antonio Honda, Daisuke Sasaki and Gami)	Six-person tag team match	11:59
9	Kota Ibushi defeated DJ Nira	Singles match	9:48
10	Konosuke Takeshita defeated Tetsuya Endo	Singles match	10:47
11	Team Homo Sapiens (Danshoku Dino, Makoto Oishi and Aja Kong) defeated Sanshiro Takagi, Toru Owashi and Akebono (c)	Six-person tag team match for the KO-D 6-Man Tag Team Championship	12:30
12	Harashima (c) defeated Yukio Sakaguchi	Singles match for the KO-D Openweight Championship	16:34
(c) / – the champion(s) heading into the match; D / – this was a dark match

=== 2014 ===
The 2014 edition of Never Mind was held on December 23 at the Korakuen Hall. In the main event, Harashima defeated Shigehiro Irie to retain the KO-D Openweight Championship.

=== 2015 ===
Never Mind 2015
- Promotion: DDT Pro-Wrestling
- Date: December 23, 2015
- City: Tokyo, Japan
- Venue: Korakuen Hall
- Attendance: 2,015

Event chronology
← Previous; Osaka Octopus 2015	Next → Sweet Dreams! 2016

Never Mind chronology
← Previous; 2014	Next → 2016

No.	Results	Stipulations	Times
1^{D}	Dai Suzuki (c) and Kouki Iwasaki defeated Gota Ihashi and Gorgeous Matsuno	Tag team match for the King of Dark Championship; As a result, Ihashi won the title.	0:15
2^{D}	Dai Suzuki and Kouki Iwasaki defeated Gota Ihashi (c) and Gorgeous Matsuno	Tag team rematch for the King of Dark Championship; As a result, Ihashi retained the title.	2:55
3	Yukio Sakaguchi, Saki Akai and Ladybeard defeated Kat-Too (Makoto Oishi and Shunma Katsumata) and Cherry	Six-person tag team match	6:03
4	T2Hii (Sanshiro Takagi, Toru Owashi and Kazuki Hirata) defeated Happy Motel (Antonio Honda and Hiroshi Fukuda) and Tomomitsu Matsunaga	Six-man tag team match	6:31
5	Yasu Urano defeated Daisuke Sasaki	Singles match	10:47
6	Shuten Doji (Masahiro Takanashi and Kota Umeda) defeated Isami Kodaka and Ryota Nakatsu, Team Dream Futures (Keisuke Ishii and Soma Takao), and Kazusada Higuchi and Suguru Miyatake	Four-way tag team match	8:50
7	Kendo Kashin (c) defeated Akito	Special rules amateur wrestling match for the DDT Extreme Championship	6:36
8	Harashima and Ken Ohka defeated Danshoku Dino and Super Sasadango Machine	Turn-Based Endless Gig match	12:31
9	Happy Motel (Konosuke Takeshita and Tetsuya Endo) defeated Yuji Okabayashi and Shigehiro Irie	Tournament final for the vacant KO-D Tag Team Championship	19:12
(c) / – the champion(s) heading into the match; D / – this was a dark match

=== 2016 ===
Never Mind 2016
- Promotion: DDT Pro-Wrestling
- Date: December 25, 2016
- City: Tokyo, Japan
- Venue: Korakuen Hall
- Attendance: 2,016

Event chronology
← Previous; God Bless DDT 2016	Next → Sweet Dreams! 2017

Never Mind chronology
← Previous; 2015	Next → 2017

No.	Results	Stipulations	Times
1	Fantastic Memories (Danshoku Dino and Keisuke Ishii) and Jiro "Ikemen" Kuroshio defeated T2Hii (Sanshiro Takagi, Toru Owashi and Kazuki Hirata)	Six-man tag team match	9:53
2	NωA (Shunma Katsumata and Mao) defeated Soma Takao and Mizuki Watase, and Antonio Honda and Guanchulo	Three-way tornado tag team match	7:24
3	Joey Ryan and Laura James defeated Makoto Oishi and Saki Akai	Tag team match	5:50
4	Yoshihiro Takayama, Kazusada Higuchi and Kouki Iwasaki defeated Smile Squash (Akito and Yasu Urano) and Tomomitsu Matsunaga	Six-man tag team match	11:13
5	Konosuke Takeshita defeated Mad Paulie	Singles match	11:15
6	Shuten Doji (Kudo, Yukio Sakaguchi and Masahiro Takanashi) (c) defeated Damnation (Daisuke Sasaki, Shuji Ishikawa and Tetsuya Endo)	Six-man tag team match for the KO-D 6-Man Tag Team Championship	15:37
7	Harashima (c) defeated Shigehiro Irie	Singles match for the KO-D Openweight Championship	23:53
(c) / – the champion(s) heading into the match

=== 2017 ===
The 2017 edition of Never Mind was held on December 24 at the Korakuen Hall. In the main event, Konosuke Takeshita defeated Colt Cabana to retain the KO-D Openweight Championship.

=== 2021 ===
The 2021 edition of Never Mind was held on December 26 at the Yoyogi National Stadium 2nd Gymnasium. In the main event, Konosuke Takeshita defeated Yuji Okabayashi to retain the KO-D Openweight Championship.

=== 2022 ===
The 2022 edition of Never Mind was held on December 29 at the Tokyo Dome City Hall. In the main event, Kazusada Higuchi defeated Yuki Ueno to retain the KO-D Openweight Championship.

=== 2024 ===
Never Mind 2024
- Promotion: CyberFight
- Brand: DDT Pro-Wrestling
- Date: December 22, 2024
- City: Tokyo, Japan
- Venue: Korakuen Hall
- Attendance: 966

Event chronology
← Previous; Get Alive 2024	Next → Ultimate Party 2024

Never Mind chronology
← Previous; 2022	Next → —

No.	Results	Stipulations	Times
1	Damnation T.A. (MJ Paul, Demus and Ilusion) defeated Takeshi Masada, Yuni and Kazuma Sumi	Six-man tag team match	8:39
2	Danshoku Dino and Kazuki Hirata defeated Toru Owashi and Antonio Honda	Tag team match	7:24
3	Jun Akiyama, Shinya Aoki and Keigo Nakamura defeated Harashima, Yukio Naya and Yuki Ishida	Six-man tag team match	10:50
4	Burning (Tetsuya Endo and Yuya Koroku) and Akito defeated The37Kamiina (Mao and To-y) and Soma Takao	Six-man tag team match	13:47
5	Super Sasadango Machine defeated Yuki Ueno	Singles match	9:20
6	Tomohiro Ishii defeated Yuki Iino	Singles match	16:55
7	Calamari Drunken Kings (Chris Brookes and Masahiro Takanashi) defeated Damnation T.A. (Daisuke Sasaki and Kanon)	Tag team match	16:38
