= Never Mind 2022 =

2022 DDT Pro-Wrestling event

- Promotional poster featuring various wrestlers
- Promotion: CyberFight
- Brand: DDT
- Date: December 29, 2022
- City: Tokyo, Japan
- Venue: Tokyo Dome City Hall
- Attendance: 1,207

Pay-per-view chronology
← Previous; Peter Pan 2022	Next → Sweet Dreams! 2023

Never Mind chronology
← Previous; 2021	Next → —

Never Mind 2022 was a professional wrestling event promoted by CyberFight's sub-brand DDT Pro-Wrestling (DDT). It took place on December 29, 2022, in Tokyo, Japan, at the Tokyo Dome City Hall. The event aired on CyberAgent's AbemaTV online linear television service and CyberFight's streaming service Wrestle Universe. It was the nineteenth event in the Never Mind series.

== Production ==
=== Background ===
Since 2001, DDT began producing their year-end shows under the branch of "Never Mind". The events' traditional venue was initially the Korakuen Hall, but during the years, the promotion moved the events to other arenas. These events conclude certain feuds and rivalries built during the year. Between 2017 and 2021, the "Never Mind" series were briefly replaced by the DDT Ultimate Party as the promotion's year-closing events.

=== Storylines ===
The event featured twelve professional wrestling matches that resulted from scripted storylines, where wrestlers portrayed villains, heroes, or less distinguishable characters in the scripted events that built tension and culminated in a wrestling match or series of matches.

== Event ==
The event started with three preshow bouts. In the first one, a tag team confrontation occurred between Yuya Koroku and Kazuma Sumi, and Hideki Okatani and Toui Kojima which was solded with the victory of the latter team and in the second one MJ Paul, Minoru Fujita and Kanon pciked up a victory over Masahiro Takanashi, Soma Takao and Antonio Honda in six-man tag team competition.

In the first main card bout, Sanshiro Takagi defeated Takeshi Masada in singles competition. Next up, Yuki "Sexy" Iino, Danshoku "Dandy" Dino, Koju "Shiningball" Takeda and Yumehito "Fantastic" Imanari defeated Akito, Shunma Katsumata, Osamu Nishimura and Shinichiro Kawamatsu in eight-man tag team competition in which they had to disband if lost. The sixth bout of the event saw Chihiro Hashimoto defeating Shinya Aoki in an intergender match. Next, Tokyo Joshi Pro-Wrestling's Saki Akai and Yuki Arai defeated Saori Anou and Riko Kawahata in tag team action. In the tenth bout, Konosuke Takeshita and Yukio Naya defeated Daisuke Sekimoto and Rickey Shane Page in tag team competition, and in the eleventh one, Mao defeated Daisuke Sasaki, Chris Brookes and Cara Noir in a four-way match. There were a total of three title matches during the show. In the first of them, Burning (Tetsuya Endo, Kotaro Suzuki and Yusuke Okada) defeated Kazuki Hirata, Toru Owashi and Naruki Doi to win the KO-D 6-Man Tag Team Championship. Endo Suzuki and Okada received a challenge from Pheromones after the match. In the second one, Jun Akiyama successfully defended the DDT Extreme Championship against Super Sasadango Machine in a comedic match which started with both wrestlers who sat down in the middle of the ring playing with their respective toy action figures. The match got physical and solded with Akiyama's victory.

The main event saw Kazusada Higuchi securing his fifth consecutive defense of the KO-D Openweight Championship over the 2022 D-Oh Grand Prix winner Yuki Ueno. Higuchi received a challenge from Yuji Hino after the match.

== Results ==
No.	Results	Stipulations	Times
1^{D}	Hideki Okatani and Toy Kojima defeated Yuya Koroku and Kazuma Sumi by pinfall	Tag team match	9:32
2^{P}	Damnation T.A. (MJ Paul, Minoru Fujita and Kanon) defeated Masahiro Takanashi, Soma Takao and Antonio Honda by pinfall	Six-man tag team match	9:31
3	Sanshiro Takagi defeated Takeshi Masada by pinfall	Singles match	4:42
4	Yukio Sakaguchi and Harashima defeated Yuji Hino and Yuki Ishida by pinfall	Tag team match	10:08
5	Pheromones (Yuki "Sexy" Iino, Danshoku "Dandy" Dino, Koju "Shiningball" Takeda and Yumehito "Fantastic" Imanari) defeated Akito, Shunma Katsumata, Osamu Nishimura and Shinichiro Kawamatsu by pinfall	Eight-man tag team match Had Pheromones lost the match they had to disband.	16:20
6	Chihiro Hashimoto defeated Shinya Aoki by pinfall	Singles match	8:21
7	Reiwa Ban AA Cannon (Saki Akai and Yuki Arai) defeated Saori Anou and Riko Kawahata by pinfall	Tag team match	12:40
8	Burning (Tetsuya Endo, Kotaro Suzuki and Yusuke Okada) defeated Kazuki Hirata, Toru Owashi and Naruki Doi (c) by pinfall	Six-man tag team match for the KO-D 6-Man Tag Team Championship	12:25
9	Jun Akiyama (c) defeated Super Sasadango Machine by pinfall	Toys match for the DDT Extreme Championship	2:30
10	Konosuke Takeshita and Yukio Naya defeated Daisuke Sekimoto and Rickey Shane Page by pinfall	Tag team match	17:43
11	Mao defeated Daisuke Sasaki, Chris Brookes and Cara Noir by pinfall	Four-way match	13:22
12	Kazusada Higuchi (c) defeated Yuki Ueno by pinfall	Singles match for the KO-D Openweight Championship	27:57
(c) / – the champion(s) heading into the match; D / – this was a dark match; P / – the match was broadcast on the pre-show
