= KO Tag Team Championship =

The KO Tag Team Championship may refer to:

- The TNA Knockouts Tag Team Championship
- The KO-D Tag Team Championship
