= Never Mind 2014 =

2014 DDT Pro-Wrestling event

- Promotion: DDT
- Date: December 23, 2014
- City: Tokyo, Japan
- Venue: Korakuen Hall
- Attendance: 2,014

Event chronology
← Previous; God Bless 2014	Next → New Year's Gift Special

Never Mind chronology
← Previous; 2013	Next → 2015

Never Mind 2014 was a professional wrestling event promoted by DDT Pro-Wrestling (DDT). It took place on December 23, 2014, in Tokyo, Japan, at the Korakuen Hall. The event aired domestically on Fighting TV Samurai. It was the fourteenth event in the Never Mind series.

== Production ==
=== Background ===
Since 2001, DDT began producing their year-end shows under the branch of "Never Mind". The events' traditional venue was initially the Korakuen Hall, but during the years, the promotion moved the events to other arenas. These events conclude certain feuds and rivalries built during the year. Beginning with 2017 and until 2021, the "Never Mind" series were briefly replaced by the DDT Ultimate Party as the promotion's year-closing events.

=== Storylines ===
The event featured ten professional wrestling matches that resulted from scripted storylines, where wrestlers portrayed villains, heroes, or less distinguishable characters in the scripted events that built tension and culminated in a wrestling match or series of matches.

=== Event ===
There were a total of three title fights at the event. In the first one, an inflatable doll named Yoshihiko defeated LiLiCo to win the Ironman Heavymetalweight Championship. In the second one, Happy Motel (Konosuke Takeshita and Tetsuya Endo) scored their fourth consecutive defense of the KO-D Tag Team Championship over Shuten Doji (Kudo and Yukio Sakaguchi). In the main event, Harashima successfully defended the KO-D Openweight Championship against Shigehiro Irie.

== Results ==
No.	Results	Stipulations	Times
1^{P}	Kazusada Higuchi and Kouki Iwasaki defeated Kota Umeda and Ryota Nakatsu	Tag team match	9:29
2	Team Dream Futures (Keisuke Ishii and Soma Takao) and T2Hii (Kazuki Hirata and Toru Owashi) defeated Antonio Honda, DJ Nira, Mikami and Yasu Urano	Eight-man tag team match	9:29
3	Makoto Oishi defeated Akito	Singles match	7:54
4	Sanshiro Takagi defeated Bernard Ackah	Singles match	4:08
5	Yoshihiko defeated LiLiCo	Singles match for the Ironman Heavymetalweight Championship	—
6	Golden Storm Riders (Daisuke Sasaki and Kota Ibushi) defeated Chinsuke Nakamura, Gota Ihashi, Shunma Katsumata and Suguru Miyatake	4-on-2 handicap match	11:34
7	Hikaru Sato and Masahiro Takanashi defeated Michael Nakazawa and Tomomitsu Matsunaga	Tag team match	0:29
8	Hikaru Sato and Masahiro Takanashi defeated Michael Nakazawa and Tomomitsu Matsunaga	Tag team match	8:58
9	Happy Motel (Konosuke Takeshita and Tetsuya Endo) (c) defeated Shuten Doji (Kudo and Yukio Sakaguchi)	Tag team match for the KO-D Tag Team Championship	18:08
10	Harashima (c) defeated Shigehiro Irie	Singles match for the KO-D Openweight Championship	22:21
(c) / – the champion(s) heading into the match; P / – the match was broadcast on the pre-show
