= Never Mind 2017 =

2017 DDT Pro-Wrestling event

- Promotional poster featuring various wrestlers
- Promotion: DDT
- Date: December 24, 2017
- City: Tokyo, Japan
- Venue: Korakuen Hall
- Attendance: 2,014

Pay-per-view chronology
← Previous; Peter Pan 2017	Next → Into The Fight 2018

Never Mind chronology
← Previous; 2016	Next → 2018

Never Mind 2017 was a professional wrestling event promoted by DDT Pro-Wrestling (DDT). It took place on December 24, 2017, in Tokyo, Japan, at the Korakuen Hall. The event aired domestically on Fighting TV Samurai. It was the seventeenth event in the Never Mind series.

Ten matches were contested at the event, including one on the pre-show, and three of DDT's eight championships were on the line. The main event saw Konosuke Takeshita successfully defending the KO-D Openweight Championship against Colt Cabana.

== Production ==
=== Background ===
Since 2001, DDT began producing their year-end shows under the branch of "Never Mind". The events' traditional venue was initially the Korakuen Hall, but during the years, the promotion moved the events to other arenas. These events conclude certain feuds and rivalries built during the year. Beginning from 2017 until 2021, the "Never Mind" series were briefly replaced by the DDT Ultimate Party as the promotion's year-closing events.

=== Storylines ===
The event featured ten professional wrestling matches that resulted from scripted storylines, where wrestlers portrayed villains, heroes, or less distinguishable characters in the scripted events that built tension and culminated in a wrestling match or series of matches.

=== Event ===
Three titles were disputed but only two of them changed hands during the pay-per-view. The Ironman Heavymetalweight Championship was the first to do so, parting between Miyu Yamashita, Kazuki Hirata and Diego. KO-D Tag Team Champions Naomichi Marufuji and Harashima defended successfully against Daisuke Sasaki and Tetsuya Endo, and in the main event, Konosuke Takeshita defeated Colt Cabana to retain the KO-D Openweight Championship, securing his tenth consecutive defense of the title.

== Results ==
No.	Results	Stipulations	Times
1^{P}	Mad Paulie defeated Gota Ihashi	Singles match	5:08
2	Keisuke Okuda and Shigehiro Irie defeated Daiki Shimomura and Soma Takao	Tag team match	8:58
3	Miyu Yamashita, Yuka Sakazaki and Yuna Manase defeated Francoise Takagi, Kazuko Hirata and Margaret Owashi	Six-man tag team match	9:47
4	Kazuko Hirata defeated Miyu Yamashita	Singles match for the Ironman Heavymetalweight Championship	—
5	Shuten Doji (Kudo, Masahiro Takanashi, Yukio Sakaguchi) and Saki Akai defeated Keisuke Ishii, Nobuhiro Shimatani, Tomomitsu Matsunaga and Tomoya	Eight-man tag team match	5:47
6	New Wrestling Aidoru (Makoto Oishi, Mao and Shunma Katsumata) defeated Antonio Honda, Danshoku Dino and Super Sasadango Machine	Six-man tag team match	10:30
7	All Out (Akito & Diego) and Kazusada Higuchi defeated Kouki Iwasaki, Mizuki Watase and Rekka	Six-man tag team match	11:59
8	Diego defeated Kazuko Hirata	Singles match for the Ironman Heavymetalweight Championship	—
9	Harashima and Naomichi Marufuji (c) defeated Damnation (Daisuke Sasaki and Tetsuya Endo)	Tag team match for the KO-D Tag Team Championship	18:47
10	Konosuke Takeshita (c) defeated Colt Cabana	Singles match for the KO-D Openweight Championship	22:23
(c) / – the champion(s) heading into the match; P / – the match was broadcast on the pre-show
