= Daichi Kakimoto =

Japanese professional wrestler

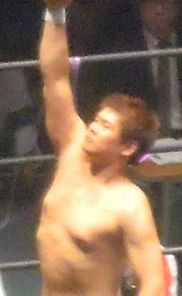
- Kakimoto in August 2012

Personal information
- Born: July 26, 1983 (age 43) Nara, Japan

Professional wrestling career
- Ring name(s): Daichi Kakimoto; Daichi
- Billed height: 180 cm (5 ft 11 in)
- Billed weight: 98 kg (216 lb)
- Debut: 2003
- Retired: 2015

Daichi Kakimoto (柿本大地, Kakimoto Daichi) is a retired Japanese professional wrestler best known for his tenure with the Japanese promotions DDT Pro-Wrestling and Big Japan Pro Wrestling.

== Professional wrestling career ==
=== Independent circuit (2003–2015) ===
As a freelancer, Kakimoto is known for working with various promotions. At NJPW Lion's Road 3rd Stage, an event promoted by New Japan Pro Wrestling on January 6, 2005, he teamed up with Kota Ibushi in a losing effort to Hero! and Kudo. At BJW Christmas Pro-Wrestling JP Special, an event produced by Big Japan Pro Wrestling on December 24, 2006, Kakimoto teamed up with Etsuko Mita to defeat Abdullah Kobayashi and Tanny Mouse. At AJPW Playboy Channel Night 2008, an event produced by All Japan Pro Wrestling on February 15, 2008, Kakimoto teamed up with Manabu Soya and defeated Keita Yano and Seiya Sanada in the semi-finals but fell short to Kushida and Bushi in the finals. At SEM/Kensuke Office, an event produced by Pro Wrestling Noah on April 30, 2008, he scored a victory over Kento Miyahara.

==== DDT Pro Wrestling (2013–2015) ====
Kakimoto made his professional wrestling debut at DDT Non-Fix 6/26, a show promoted by DDT Pro Wrestling on June 26, 2003 where he fell short to Super Uchuu Power. At DDT How Is It Osaka? on January 5, 2008, he participated in an identity swap battle royal in which he portraited Danshoku Dino and faced himself, Sanshiro Takagi, Michael Nakazawa, Tanomusaku Toba, Poison Sawada Julie, Harashima, Kudo and others.

He worked for various signature events of the company such as DDT Peter Pan. At Budokan Peter Pan on August 18, 2012 he competed in a Rumble rules match for the Ironman Heavymetalweight Championship also involving DJ Nira, Mio Shirai, Yuzuki Aikawa, Yoshiaki Fujiwara and others.

As of the DDT Into The Fight, at the 2014 edition of the event, he won a Rumble rules match for the Ironman Heavymetalweight Championship also involving Yasu Urano, Saki Akai, Guanchulo, Emi Sakura and others. He dropped the title further that night to Kazuki Hirata.

Kakimoto retired from professional wrestling on July 22, 2015 at DDT/What Are Cherry Blossoms Without Sake where he went into a time-limit draw against Masahiro Takanashi. However, he came out of retirement for one time at Judgement 2017: DDT 20th Anniversary on March 20 to compete in a Rumble rules match for the Ironman Heavymetalweight Championship and the King of Dark Championship also involving Munenori Sawa, Tomohiko Hashimoto, Mad Paulie, Mikami and others.

== Championships and accomplishments ==
- DDT Pro-Wrestling
  - Ironman Heavymetalweight Championship (3 times)
  - KO-D Tag Team Championship (1 time) – with Kota Ibushi
  - World Ōmori Championship (1 time)
  - KO-D Tag League (2005) – with Kota Ibushi
