= Gentarō =

Gentarō, Gentarou or Gentaro (written: 源太郎, 弦太郎 or 元太郎) is a masculine Japanese given name. Notable people with the name include:

- Kodama Gentarō (兒玉 源太郎, 1852–1906), Imperial Japanese Army general and Meiji era government official
- Yamashita Gentarō (山下 源太郎, 1863–1931), Imperial Japanese Navy admiral
- Gentaro Kawase (川瀬 源太郎, 1916–2003), Japanese business executive
- Gentarō Ishida (石田 弦太郎, 1944–2013), Japanese actor and voice actor
- Gentaro Takahashi (高橋 元太郎, born 1974), Japanese professional wrestler
