= Koichiro Kimura =

Japanese wrestler (1969–2014)

Personal information
- Born: November 18, 1969 Tatebayashi, Gunma Prefecture, Japan
- Died: October 28, 2014 (aged 44) Tokyo, Japan
- Cause of death: Pneumonia

Professional wrestling career
- Ring name(s): Koichiro Kimura; Lion Man; Super Uchuu Power
- Billed height: 1.83 m (6 ft 0 in)
- Billed weight: 98 kg (216 lb)
- Debut: July 18, 1990
- Retired: July 20, 2014 (last match)

Koichiro Kimura (木村浩一郎, Kimura Kōichirō; November 18, 1969 – October 28, 2014) was a Japanese mixed martial artist and professional wrestler, also known under the ring name Super Uchuu Power (スーパー宇宙パワー, Sūpā Uchū Pawā). Kimura was known for his work in promotions like Dramatic Dream Team, W*ING, Fighting World of Japan Pro Wrestling and All Japan Pro Wrestling, among others. He was also involved in MMA, facing Rickson Gracie at the second event of Vale Tudo Japan and being the founder of the female MMA brands AX and G-Shooto. He also competed in Fighting Network RINGS during its early years and participated in both mixed-style shoot contests and shoot style matches for the company. Kimura died of pneumonia on October 28, 2014.

== Championships and accomplishments ==
- Dramatic Dream Team

- KO-D Openweight Championship (3 times)
- KO-D Tag Team Championship (2 times) – with Mikami
- DDT Tag League/KO-D Tag League – with Tomohiko Hashimoto (2000) and Mikami (2001)

- IWA Kakutō Shijuku/Kokusai Promotion

- IWA World Tag Team Championship (3 times) with Goro Tsurumi (2) and Ho Death Minh (1)

== Mixed martial arts record ==
Professional record breakdown
3 matches	1 win	2 losses
By submission	1	2

Res.	Record	Opponent	Method	Event	Date	Round	Time	Location	Notes
Loss	1–2	Rickson Gracie	Submission (rear-naked choke)	Vale Tudo Japan 1995	April 20, 1995	1	2:07	Tokyo, Japan	
Win	1–1	Wayne Emons	Submission (guillotine choke)	Vale Tudo Japan 1995	April 20, 1995	1	6:05	Tokyo, Japan	
Loss	0–1	Todd Hays	Submission (guillotine choke)	Vale Tudo Japan 1995	April 20, 1995	1	2:05	Tokyo, Japan	
