= KO-D Tag Team Championship =

Professional wrestling tag team championship

- Current championship design (2020–present)

Details
- Promotion: CyberFight
- Brand: DDT Pro-Wrestling
- Date established: June 2, 2001
- Current champions: paleyouth (Takeshi Masada and Yuya Koroku)
- Date won: September 27, 2026

Other names
- EMLL KO-D Tag Team Championship; CMLL KO-D Tag Team Championship
Statistics
- First champions: Nosawa and Takashi Sasaki
- Most reigns: Harashima (12 reigns)
- Longest reign: Yuki Ueno and Naomi Yoshimura (296 days)
- Shortest reign: Shoichi Ichimiya and Seiya Morohashi (4 days)
- Oldest champion: Tatsumi Fujinami (58 years, 234 days)
- Youngest champion: Konosuke Takeshita (20 years, 208 days)

The KO-D Tag Team Championship (Japanese: KO-Dタッグ王座, Hepburn: KO-D Taggu Ōza) is a professional wrestling tag team championship owned by the DDT Pro-Wrestling (DDT) promotion. "KO-D" stands for "King of DDT", the promotion's unofficial governing body. It is one of three tag team titles contested for in DDT, along with the KO-D 6-Man Tag Team Championship and the KO-D 10-Man Tag Team Championship. The current champions are Shinya Aoki and Junta Miyawaki, who are in their first reign as a team and individually. They won the title by defeating Fantômes Dramatic (Chris Brookes and Harashima) at Wrestle Peter Pan on August 11, 2026.

The title was introduced in June 2001, when Nosawa and Takashi Sasaki returned to DDT with new championship belts that had allegedly been sanctioned by the Consejo Mundial de Lucha Libre (CMLL) and which they had won in Mexico. In its early days, DDT occasionally referred to the title as the EMLL KO-D Tag Team Championship (Note: Japanese: EMLL認定KO-Dタッグ王座, Hepburn: EMLL-nintei KO-D Taggu Ōza), then the CMLL KO-D Tag Team Championship (Note: Japanese: CMLL認定KO-Dタッグ王座, Hepburn: CMLL-nintei KO-D Taggu Ōza).

== History ==
First belt design used from 2001 to 2020

The titles were created in 2001 when Nosawa and Takashi Sasaki, while on tour in Mexico, allegedly defeated Starman and Vertigo on June 2, 2001, at a Consejo Mundial de Lucha Libre event. On August 16, Mikami and Super Uchuu Power vacated the titles and put it up for grab in the KO-D Tag League. They then defeated Sanshiro Takagi and Shoichi Ichimiya in the finals to win it back. However, a month later, the team split up and the titles were vacated again.

The titles were vacated a third time in May 2002 after Mikami suffered an injury. It was once again contested in the KO-D Tag League and won by the Suicideboyz (Mikami and Thanomsak Toba).

The 2003 and 2004 editions of the KO-D Tag League saw respectively Tomohiko Hashimoto and Seiya Morohashi, and Hero! and Kudo win the tournament and the title. On July 31, 2004, Glenn "Q" Spectre became the first non-Japanese wrestler to win the title when he teamed with Danshoku Dino to defeat Ryuji Ito and Sanshiro Takagi.

In February 2020, the belts were replaced with a new design featuring the current DDT logo.

On May 22, 2022, Asuka became the first woman to win the title when she teamed with Mao to defeat Calamari Drunken Kings (Chris Brookes and Masahiro Takanashi). On November 22, it was announced that Harimau (Kazusada Higuchi and Naomi Yoshimura) would vacate the title because Yoshimura suffered an injury four days prior and would be out of action.

On May 21, 2023, at the 2023 King of DDT Final event, champion Shunma Katsumata suffered a broken foot during his first defense of the DDT Extreme Championship. The following day, Katsumata had to vacate both the DDT Extreme and KO-D Tag Team Championships.

On November 21, 2024, it was announced that Katsumata had sustained a torn anterior ligament and that he and his partner Mao would relinquish their title once again.

== Reigns ==
As of November 21, 2026, there have been a total of 90 reigns shared between 80 different teams composed of 70 distinctive champions, and 14 vacancies. The inaugural champions were Nosawa and Takashi Sasaki. Nine teams are tied for the most reigns at two, while individually, Harashima has the most with 12. The sole reign of Nautilus (Yuki Ueno and Naomi Yoshimura) is the longest at 296 days. The record for the shortest reign belongs to Seiya Morohashi and Shoichi Ichimiya whose sole reign lasted for four days. The Golden☆Lovers (Kota Ibushi and Kenny Omega) have the longest combined reign at 351 days. Tatsumi Fujinami is the oldest champion at 58, while Konosuke Takeshita is the youngest at 20.

The current champions are Shinya Aoki and Junta Miyawaki, who are in their first reign as a team and individually. They won the title by defeating Fantômes Dramatic (Chris Brookes and Harashima) at Wrestle Peter Pan in Tokyo, Japan, on August 11, 2026.

Key
No.	Overall reign number
Reign	Reign number for the specific team—reign numbers for the individuals are in parentheses, if different
Days	Number of days held
Defenses	Number of successful defenses
+	Current reign is changing daily

No.	Champion	Championship change			Reign statistics			Notes	Ref.
No.	Champion	Date	Event	Location	Reign	Days	Defenses	Notes	Ref.
1	Nosawa and Takashi Sasaki	June 2, 2001	CMLL on Televisa	Mexico City, D.F.	1	33	1	Allegedly defeated Starman and Vertigo at a CMLL event to become the first champions. Although officially recognized, this reign may be fictitious.	
2	MikaUchuu (Mikami and Super Uchuu Power)	July 5, 2001	Non-Fix: 7.5	Tokyo, Japan	1	42	1		
—	Vacated	August 16, 2001	—	—	—	—	—	MikaUchuu vacated the title in order to enter the KO-D Tag League.	
3	MikaUchuu (Mikami and Super Uchuu Power)	September 30, 2001	Sunday DDT Theater	Saitama, Japan	2	32	0	Defeated Sanshiro Takagi and Shoichi Ichimiya (as the fake Sanshiro Takagi) in the final of the KO-D Tag League to win the vacant title.	
—	Vacated	November 1, 2001	Non-Fix: 11.1	Tokyo, Japan	—	—	—	Title vacated after MikaUchuu split as a team.	
4	X-RAB (Gentaro and Yoshiya)	November 1, 2001	Non-Fix: 11.1	Tokyo, Japan	1	41	1	Defeated Suicideboyz (Mikami and Thanomsak Toba) to win the vacant title.	
5	Mikami and Takashi Sasaki	December 12, 2001	Never Mind 2001	Tokyo, Japan	1 (3, 2)	155	2		
—	Vacated	May 16, 2002	Non-Fix: 5.16	Tokyo, Japan	—	—	—	Title vacated due to Mikami being injured in Tokyo on April 25, 2002.	
6	Suicideboyz (Mikami and Thanomsak Toba)	August 25, 2002	The Ring	Chiba, Japan	1 (4, 1)	60	2	Defeated Poison Sawada Julie and Super Uchuu Power in the final of the KO-D Tag League.	
7	Akarengers (Takashi Sasaki and Gentaro)	October 24, 2002	Dead or Alive	Tokyo, Japan	1 (3, 2)	99	0	This was also for Akarengers' WEW Tag Team Championship.	
8	Sanshiro Takagi and Tomohiko Hashimoto	January 31, 2003	Sheep 2003	Tokyo, Japan	1	97	2		
—	Vacated	May 8, 2003	Non-Fix: 5.8	Tokyo, Japan	—	—	—	Title vacated due to Tomohiko Hashimoto being injured.	
9	Shoichi Ichimiya and Seiya Morohashi	May 18, 2003	Max Bump 2003	Tokyo, Japan	1	4	0	Defeated Super Uchuu Power and Takashi Sasaki in the final of an eight-team one-night tournament. Ichimiya wrestled as Kurt Angile (fake Kurt Angle).	
10	Team Karamawari (Takashi Sasaki and Thanomsak Toba)	May 22, 2003	Non-Fix: 5.22	Tokyo, Japan	1 (4, 2)	112	2		
—	Vacated	September 11, 2003	Non-Fix: 9.11	Tokyo, Japan	—	—	—	Team Karamawari vacated the title after losing to Super Uchuu Power and Super Uchuu Power Omega.	
11	Tomohiko Hashimoto and Seiya Morohashi	September 28, 2003	Who's Gonna Top?	Tokyo, Japan	1 (2, 2)	92	1	Defeated Team Karamawari (Takashi Sasaki and Thanomsak Toba) in the final of the KO-D Tag League.	
12	Hero! and Kudo	December 29, 2003	Never Mind 2003	Tokyo, Japan	1	44	0	This was a three-way tables, ladders, and chairs tornado tag team match also including Mikami and Onryo.	
13	Akarengers (Takashi Sasaki and Gentaro)	February 11, 2004	Future Port 2004	Yokohama, Japan	2 (5, 3)	141	3		
14	Sanshiro Takagi and Ryuji Ito	July 1, 2004	Audience 2004	Tokyo, Japan	1 (2, 1)	30	0	This was a Dangerous Weapons Rumble.	
15	Gay Machine Guns (Danshoku Dino and Glenn "Q" Spectre)	July 31, 2004	Boys Be Ambitious 2004	Tokyo, Japan	1	47	0	This was a three-way match also including Akarengers (Takashi Sasaki and Gentaro).	
—	Vacated	September 16, 2004	Who's Gonna Top? Tour 2004 in Shin-Kiba	Tokyo, Japan	—	—	—	Title vacated before the start of the KO-D Tag League.	
16	Hero! and Kudo	September 30, 2004	Who's Gonna Top? 2004	Tokyo, Japan	2	33	0	Defeated Danshoku Dino and Glenn "Q" Spectre in the final of the KO-D Tag League	
17	MoroToba (Seiya Morohashi and Thanomsak Toba)	November 2, 2004	Day Dream Believer 2004	Tokyo, Japan	1 (3, 3)	115	3		
18	Far East Connection (Tomohiko Hashimoto and Nobutaka Moribe)	February 25, 2005	Don't Try This at Home 2005	Tokyo, Japan	1 (3, 1)	68	1		
19	MoroToba (Seiya Morohashi and Thanomsak Toba)	May 4, 2005	Max Bump 2005	Tokyo, Japan	2 (4, 4)	95	2	This was a three-way match also including Macho☆Pump and Sho Kanzaki.	
20	Toru Owashi and Darkside Hero!	August 7, 2005	Dramatic Dragons 2005	Nagoya, Japan	1 (3, 1)	77	1	Darkside Hero! previously held the title under the ring name Hero!.	
21	Daichi Kakimoto and Kota Ibushi	October 23, 2005	Day Dream Believer 2005	Tokyo, Japan	1	133	2		
22	Italian Four Horsemen (Francesco Togo and Mori Bernard)	March 5, 2006	DDT 9th Anniversary: Judgement 10	Tokyo, Japan	1 (1, 2)	263	6		
23	Seiya Morohashi and Poco Takanashi	November 23, 2006	God Bless DDT 2006	Tokyo, Japan	1 (5, 1)	129	2	Takanashi won the title under the name Poco Takanashi, then reverted to the name Masa Takanashi during this reign.	
24	Nurunuru Brothers (Michael Nakazawa and Tomomitsu Matsunaga)	April 1, 2007	Aprilfool 2007	Tokyo, Japan	1	139	9		
25	Aloha World Order (Prince Togo and Antonio "The Dragon" Honda)	August 18, 2007	Sanshiro Festival 2007	Tokyo, Japan	1 (2, 1)	101	1	Prince Togo previously held the title under the ring name Francesco Togo.	
—	Vacated	November 27, 2007	God Bless DDT 2007	Tokyo, Japan	—	—	—	aWo (Prince Togo and Antonio "The Dragon" Honda) defended the title against Toru Owashi and Seiya Morohashi, but the match ended in a no contest after Togo turned on Honda, leaving aWo to form Metal Vampires with Owashi and Morohashi.	
26	Suicideboyz (Mikami and Thanomsak Toba)	April 11, 2008	O-Hanami DDT: Final Day!	Tokyo, Japan	2 (5, 5)	198	3	Defeated Kudo and Yasu Urano in the final bout of a four-team group tournament to win the vacant title.	
27	Disaster Box (Toru Owashi and Harashima)	October 26, 2008	Day Dream Believer 2008	Tokyo, Japan	1 (4, 2)	90	1	Harashima previously held the title under the ring names Hero! and Darkside Hero!.	
28	Golden☆Lovers (Kota Ibushi and Kenny Omega)	January 24, 2009	Dramatic 2009 Special	Tokyo, Japan	1 (1, 2)	106	1		
29	Italian Four Horsemen (Francesco Togo and Piza Michinoku)	May 10, 2009	Wrestling Tonkotsu 2009	Fukuoka, Japan	1 (3, 1)	105	0		
30	Kudo and Yasu Urano	August 23, 2009	Ryōgoku Peter Pan	Tokyo, Japan	1 (3, 1)	172	5	This was a four-way tag team elimination match also involving the teams of Jun Kasai and Mikami, and Kenny Omega and Mike Angels.	
31	Hentai Big Boss (Sanshiro Takagi and Munenori Sawa)	February 11, 2010	Into The Fight 2010	Tokyo, Japan	1 (3, 1)	199	12		
32	Shirojiro (Danshoku Dino and Shiro Koshinaka)	August 29, 2010	Summer Vacation Memories 2010	Tokyo, Japan	1 (2, 1)	77	2	This was a three-way match also involving Suicideboyz (Mikami and Thanomsak Toba).	
33	From the Northern Country (Antonio Honda and Daisuke Sasaki)	November 14, 2010	Osaka Bay Blues Special	Osaka, Japan	1 (2, 1)	98	3		
34	Granma (Gentaro and Yasu Urano)	February 20, 2011	DDT Funabashi Legend Again 2011	Funabashi, Japan	1 (4, 2)	104	3		
35	TKG48 (Munenori Sawa and Shigehiro Irie)	June 4, 2011	Non-Fix: 6.4	Tokyo, Japan	1 (2, 1)	15	0		
36	Kenny Omega and Michael Nakazawa	June 19, 2011	What Are You Doing!? 2011	Tokyo, Japan	1 (2, 2)	5	0		
37	Hero! Gundam (Harashima and Hero!)	June 24, 2011	6.24 KO-D Tag Team Championship One Match Show	Tokyo, Japan	1 (5, 1)	30	1	Minoru Fujita played Hero!, the former masked persona of Harashima.	
38	Masa Takanashi and Daisuke Sekimoto	July 24, 2011	Ryōgoku Peter Pan 2011	Tokyo, Japan	1 (2, 1)	35	0	This was a four-way elimination match also involving Granma (Gentaro and Yasu Urano), and Kenny Omega and Michael Nakazawa.	
39	Homoiro Clover Z (Kota Ibushi and Danshoku Dino)	August 28, 2011	Summer Vacation Memories 2011	Tokyo, Japan	1 (3, 2)	15	0		
—	Vacated	September 12, 2011	—	—	—	—	—	Title vacated due to Kota Ibushi dislocating his left shoulder.	
40	Keisuke Ishii and Shigehiro Irie	October 10, 2011	Sapporo Pro-Wrestling Festival: DDT	Sapporo, Japan	1 (1, 2)	82	3	Defeated Homoiro Clover Z (Danshoku Dino and Makoto Oishi) to win the vacant title.	
41	Crying Wolf (Yasu Urano and Yuji Hino)	December 31, 2011	Never Mind 2011	Tokyo, Japan	1 (3, 1)	71	3		
42	New World Japan (Sanshiro Takagi and Soma Takao)	March 11, 2012	Judgement 2012	Tokyo, Japan	1 (4, 1)	35	4		
43	Crying Wolf (Yasu Urano and Yuji Hino)	April 15, 2012	Rozan Shōryū Ha in Nagoya 2012	Nagoya, Japan	2 (4, 2)	62	2		
44	Homoiro Clover Z (Kudo and Makoto Oishi)	June 16, 2012	Ibaraki de Ikappe Yokappe 2012	Ibaraki, Japan	1 (4, 1)	63	3		
45	Mikami and Tatsumi Fujinami	August 18, 2012	Budokan Peter Pan	Tokyo, Japan	1 (6, 1)	141	3		
46	UraShima (Harashima and Yasu Urano)	January 6, 2013	New Year Yokohama Pro-Wrestling Festival: DDT	Yokohama, Japan	1 (6, 5)	117	4		
47	Hikaru Sato and Yukio Sakaguchi	May 3, 2013	Max Bump 2013	Tokyo, Japan	1	107	3		
48	Yankee Nichokenju (Isami Kodaka and Yuko Miyamoto)	August 18, 2013	Ryōgoku Peter Pan 2013	Tokyo, Japan	1	161	6		
49	Golden☆Lovers (Kota Ibushi and Kenny Omega)	January 26, 2014	Sweet Dreams! 2014	Tokyo, Japan	2 (4, 3)	245	6	This was a three-way match, also involving Konosuke Takeshita and Tetsuya Endo.	
50	Happy Motel (Konosuke Takeshita and Tetsuya Endo)	September 28, 2014	DDT Dramatic General Election 2014 Final Voting Day: Last Request Special	Tokyo, Japan	1	140	4		
51	Strong BJ (Daisuke Sekimoto and Yuji Okabayashi)	February 15, 2015	Saitama Super DDT 2015	Saitama, Japan	1 (2, 1)	189	4		
52	Golden☆Storm Riders (Kota Ibushi and Daisuke Sasaki)	August 23, 2015	Ryōgoku Peter Pan 2015	Tokyo, Japan	1 (5, 2)	71	1		
—	Vacated	November 2, 2015	—	—	—	—	—	Title vacated due to Kota Ibushi being sidelined with a cervical disc herniation.	
53	Happy Motel (Konosuke Takeshita and Tetsuya Endo)	December 23, 2015	Never Mind 2015	Tokyo, Japan	2	89	1	Defeated Yuji Okabayashi and Shigehiro Irie in the final of a four-team tournament to win the vacant title.	
54	Daisuke Sasaki and Shuji Ishikawa	March 21, 2016	Judgement 2016: DDT 19th Anniversary	Tokyo, Japan	1 (3, 1)	104	3		
55	Bad Commis (Ken Ohka and Kai)	July 3, 2016	Super Starlanes 2016	Fukuoka, Japan	1	56	0		
56	Smile Yankee (Harashima and Yuko Miyamoto)	August 28, 2016	Ryōgoku Peter Pan 2016	Tokyo, Japan	1 (7, 2)	42	1		
57	Damnation (Daisuke Sasaki and Tetsuya Endo)	October 9, 2016	Sapporo Pro-Wrestling Festival 2016: DDT – Sea Urchin	Sapporo, Japan	1 (4, 3)	56	1		
58	Konosuke Takeshita and Mike Bailey	December 4, 2016	Osaka Octopus 2016	Osaka, Japan	1 (3, 1)	36	1		
59	Masakatsu Funaki and Yukio Sakaguchi	January 9, 2017	Road to Super Arena in Oyodo: Dramatic Dream Tenroku	Osaka, Japan	1 (1, 2)	110	2		
60	New No Fear (Yoshihiro Takayama and Danshoku Dino)	April 29, 2017	Max Bump 2017	Tokyo, Japan	1 (1, 3)	10	0		
—	Vacated	May 9, 2017	—	—	—	—	—	Title vacated after Yoshihiro Takayama suffered a career-ending neck injury on May 4.	
61	YaroZ (Shigehiro Irie and Kazusada Higuchi)	May 21, 2017	Road to Ryogoku 2017: Dramatic Dream Clock Tower	Sapporo, Japan	1 (3, 1)	91	3	Defeated All Out (Konosuke Takeshita and Akito) to win the vacant title.	
62	HarashiMarufuji (Harashima and Naomichi Marufuji)	August 20, 2017	Ryōgoku Peter Pan 2017	Tokyo, Japan	1 (8, 1)	217	4		
63	SekiGuchi (Daisuke Sekimoto and Kazusada Higuchi)	March 25, 2018	Judgement 2018: DDT 21st Anniversary	Tokyo, Japan	1 (3, 2)	93	2		
64	Damnation (Tetsuya Endo and Mad Paulie)	June 26, 2018	DDT Live! Maji Manji #9	Tokyo, Japan	1 (4, 1)	26	0		
65	Moonlight Express (Mike Bailey and Mao)	July 22, 2018	Summer Vacation 2018	Tokyo, Japan	1 (2, 1)	240	3		
66	Damnation (Daisuke Sasaki and Soma Takao)	March 21, 2019	Into The Fight 2019	Tokyo, Japan	1 (5, 2)	288	9		
67	Nautilus (Yuki Ueno and Naomi Yoshimura)	January 3, 2020	New Year's Gift Special! All Seats 2,000 Yen Show!! 2020	Tokyo, Japan	1	296	7		
68	Eruption (Kazusada Higuchi and Yukio Sakaguchi)	October 25, 2020	Road to Ultimate Party 2020	Tokyo, Japan	1 (3, 3)	168	2		
69	Smile Pissari (Harashima and Yuji Okabayashi)	April 11, 2021	April Fool 2021	Tokyo, Japan	1 (9, 2)	76	1		
70	The37Kamiina (Konosuke Takeshita and Shunma Katsumata)	June 26, 2021	Summer Vacation 2021 Tour in Osaka	Osaka, Japan	1 (4, 1)	108	2		
71	Disaster Box (Harashima and Naomi Yoshimura)	October 12, 2021	Get Alive 2021	Tokyo, Japan	1 (10, 2)	83	1		
—	Vacated	January 3, 2022	—	—	—	—	—	Disaster Box vacated the title for the upcoming Ultimate Tag League.	
72	Disaster Box (Harashima and Naomi Yoshimura)	February 27, 2022	Ultimate Tag League 2022 the Final!!	Tokyo, Japan	2 (11, 3)	21	0	Defeated The37Kamiina (Konosuke Takeshita and Yuki Ueno) in the final of the 2022 Ultimate Tag League to win the vacant title.	
73	Calamari Drunken Kings (Chris Brookes and Masahiro Takanashi)	March 20, 2022	Judgement 2022: DDT 25th Anniversary	Tokyo, Japan	1 (1, 3)	63	2		
74	Mao and Asuka	May 22, 2022	Audience 2022	Tokyo, Japan	1 (2, 1)	63	0	Asuka was the first woman to hold the title. The tag team was retroactively named Venymao.	
75	Harimau (Kazusada Higuchi and Naomi Yoshimura)	July 24, 2022	Summer Vacation 2022	Tokyo, Japan	1 (4, 4)	121	2		
—	Vacated	November 22, 2022	—	—	—	—	—	Title vacated due to Yoshimura being sidelined with an injury.	
76	ShunMao (Mao and Shunma Katsumata)	January 3, 2023	Hatsuyume 2023	Tokyo, Japan	1 (3, 2)	139	5	Defeated CDK (Chris Brookes and Masahiro Takanashi) to win the vacant titles.	
—	Vacated	May 22, 2023	—	—	—	—	—	Title vacated after Katsumata suffered a broken foot during his first defense of the DDT Extreme Championship on May 21.	
77	Damnation T.A (Daisuke Sasaki and MJ Paul)	June 25, 2023	What Are You Doing 2023	Tokyo, Japan	1 (6, 2)	49	0	Defeated The37Kamiina (Yuki Ueno and Toy Kojima) to win the vacant title. MJ Paul previously held the titles under the ring name Mad Paulie.	
78	Omega (Yuji Hino and Makoto Oishi)	August 13, 2023	Saki Akai 10th Anniversary Tour in Korakuen!!	Tokyo, Japan	1 (3, 2)	27	0	The Omega stable name was stylized as Ω.	
79	Damnation T.A (Minoru Fujita and Kanon)	September 9, 2023	DDT Big Bang 2023	Tokyo, Japan	1 (2, 1)	25	0		
80	Romance Dawn (Soma Takao and Shota)	October 4, 2023	God Bless DDT 2023 Tour in Shinjuku	Tokyo, Japan	1 (3, 1)	109	3		
81	Damnation T.A (Daisuke Sasaki and Kanon)	January 21, 2024	Sweet Dreams! 2024 Tour in Shinagawa	Tokyo, Japan	1 (7, 2)	17	0		
82	Burning (Tetsuya Endo and Yuki Iino)	February 7, 2024	Into the Fight 2024 Tour in Shinjuku	Tokyo, Japan	1 (5, 1)	185	3		
83	Schadenfreude International (Chris Brookes and Takeshi Masada)	August 10, 2024	Osaka vs. Tokyo: Dream East–West Wrestling War 2024	Osaka, Japan	1 (2, 1)	41	0		
84	ShunMao (Mao and Shunma Katsumata)	September 20, 2024	Dramatic Denshi Ticket in Shinjuku	Tokyo, Japan	2 (4, 3)	62	2		
—	Vacated	November 21, 2024	—	—	—	—	—	Title vacated after Katsumata was diagnosed with a torn anterior ligament.	
85	The37Kamiina (Mao and To-y)	December 28, 2024	Ultimate Party 2024	Tokyo, Japan	1 (5, 1)	82	1	Defeated Burning (Tetsuya Endo and Yuya Koroku) to win the vacant titles.	
86	Astronauts (Fuminori Abe and Takuya Nomura)	March 20, 2025	Judgement 2025	Tokyo, Japan	1	101	5		
87	The Apex (Yuki Iino and Yukio Naya)	June 29, 2025	King of Kings	Tokyo, Japan	1 (2, 1)	127	5		
88	Strange Love Connection (Mao and Kanon)	November 3, 2025	Ultimate Party 2025	Tokyo, Japan	1 (6, 3)	153	4	This was a three-way match also involving Team 200kg (Chihiro Hashimoto and Yuu).	
89	Fantômes Dramatic (Chris Brookes and Harashima)	April 5, 2026	Change Age	Tokyo, Japan	1 (3, 12)	128	3		
90	Shinya Aoki and Junta Miyawaki	August 11, 2026	Wrestle Peter Pan	Tokyo, Japan	1	47	1		
91	Paleyouth (Takeshi Masada and Yuya Koroku)	September 27, 2026	Final Face 2026 Goodbye To Shinjuku FACE!	Tokyo, Japan	1	55+	2		

== Combined reigns ==
As of November 21, 2026.

=== By team ===
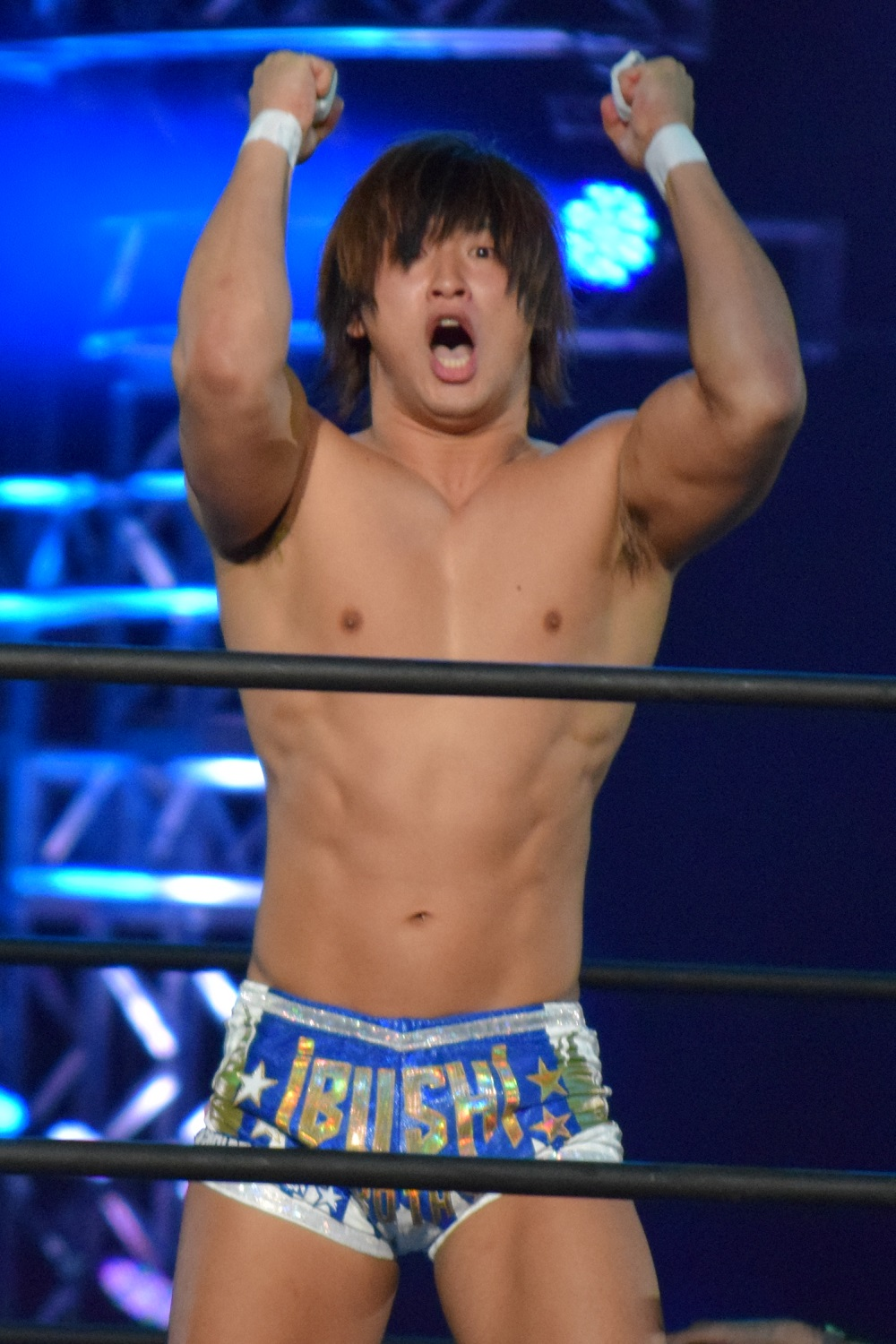
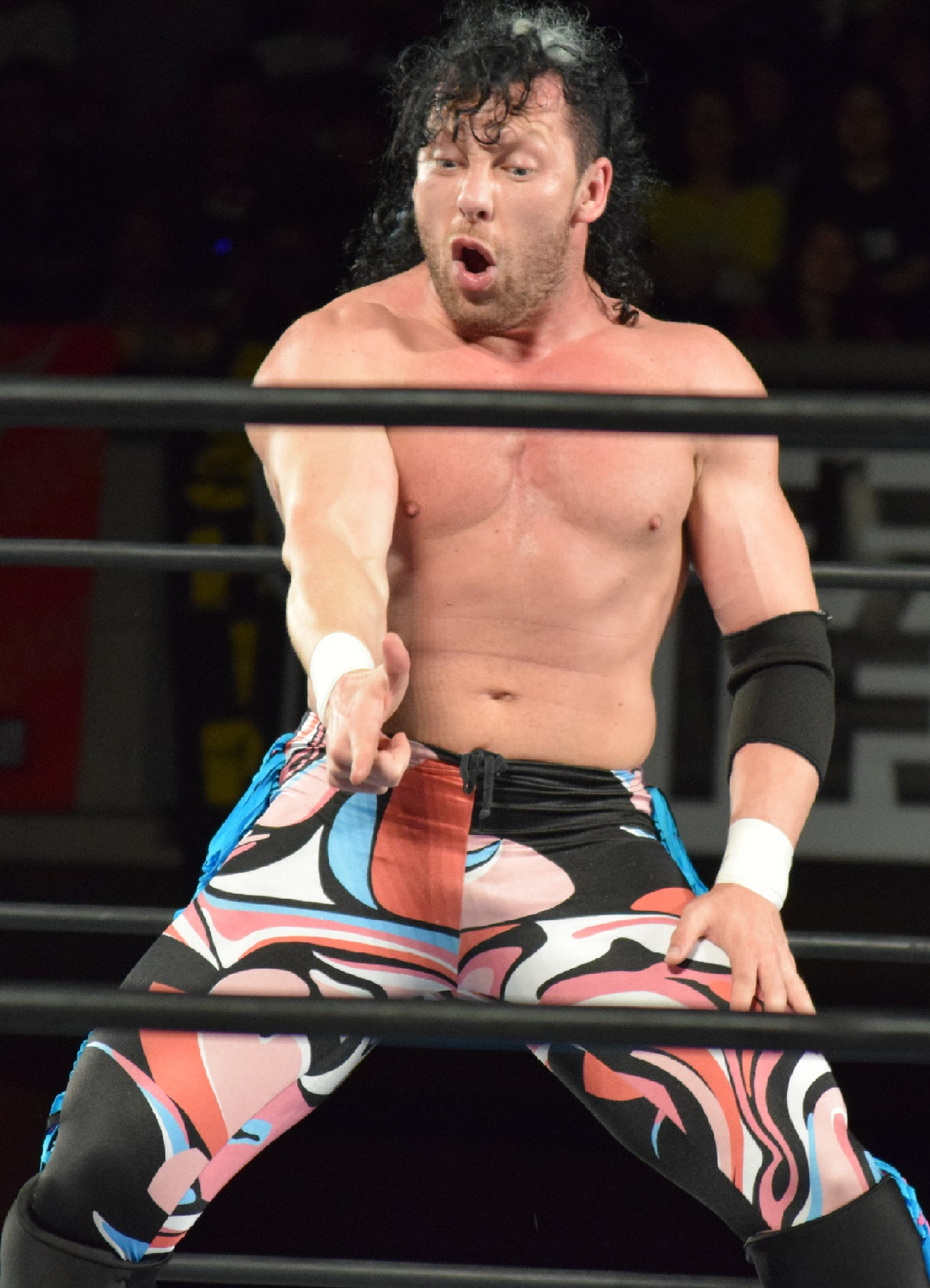
Golden☆Lovers (Kota Ibushi and Kenny Omega), record longest combined reign as a team at 351 days.
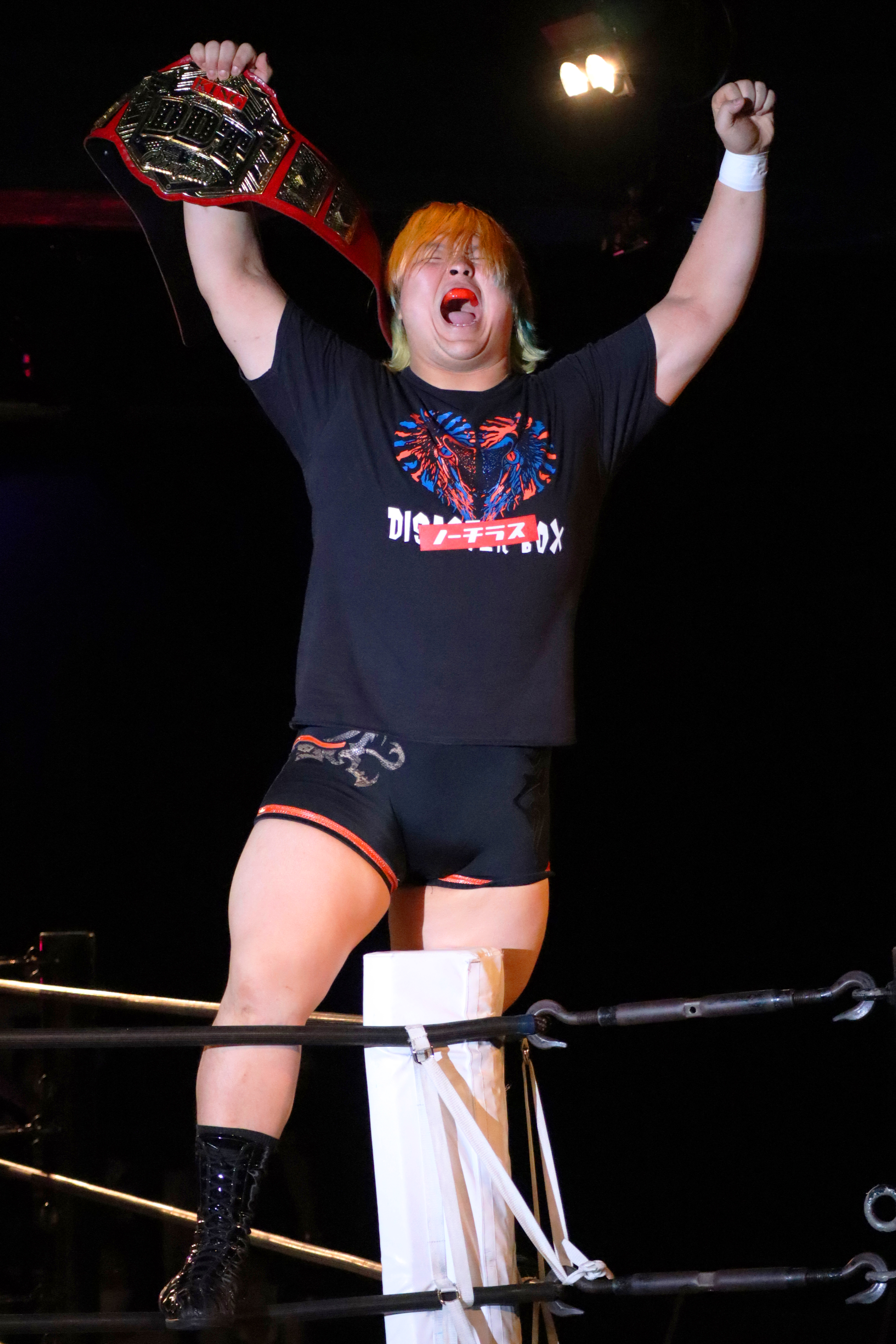
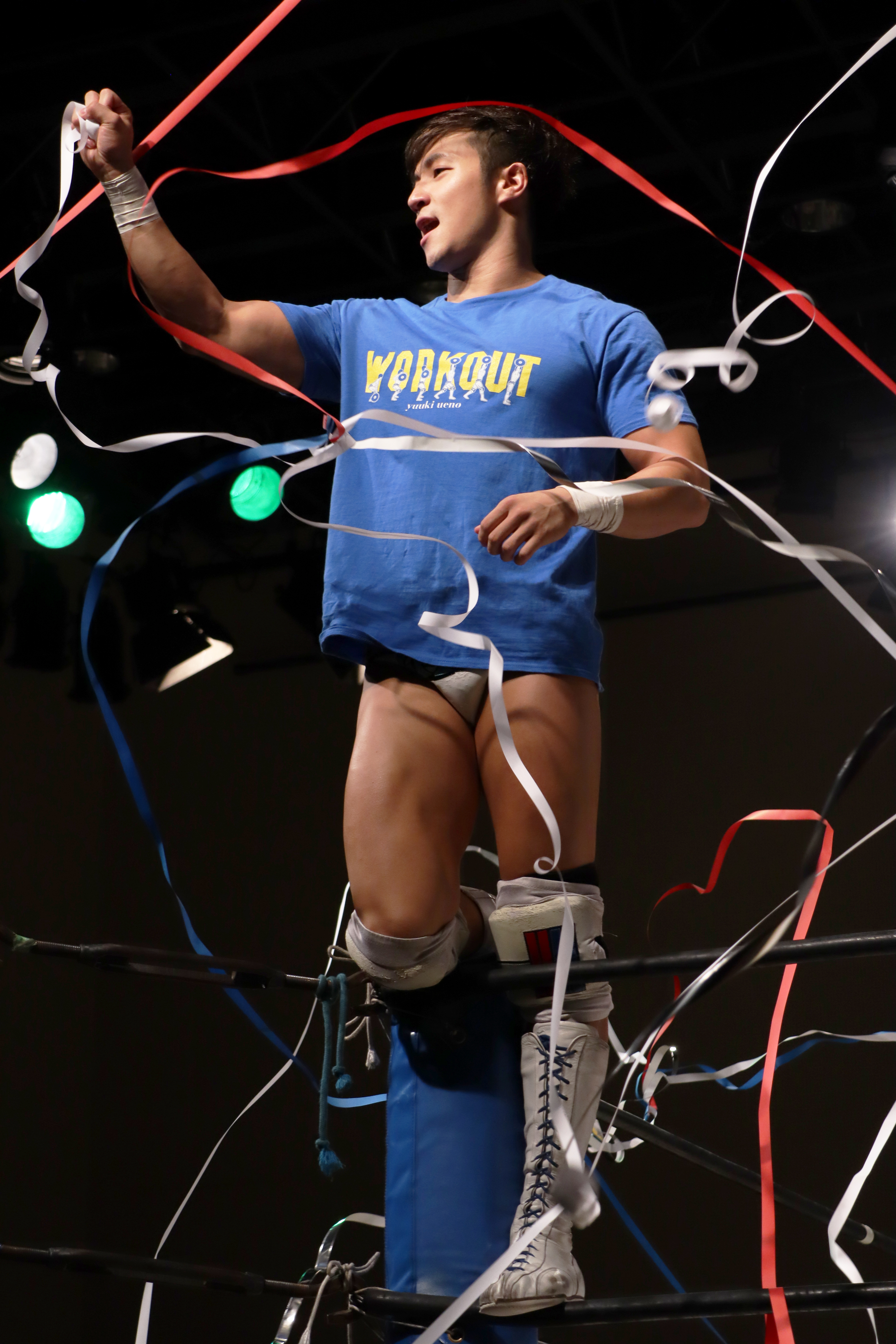
Nautilus (Naomi Yoshimura and Yuki Ueno), record longest reign at 296 days.

†	Indicates the current champions

Rank	Team	No. of reigns	Combined defenses	Combined days
1	Golden☆Lovers (Kota Ibushi and Kenny Omega)	2	7	351
2	Nautilus (Yuki Ueno and Naomi Yoshimura)	1	7	296
3	Damnation (Daisuke Sasaki and Soma Takao)	1	9	288
4	Italian Four Horsemen (Francesco Togo and Mori Bernard)	1	8	263
5	Suicideboyz (Mikami and Thanomsak Toba)	2	5	258
6	Moonlight Express (Mao and Mike Bailey)	1	3	240
6	Akarengers (Takashi Sasaki and Gentaro)	2	3	240
8	Happy Motel (Konosuke Takeshita and Tetsuya Endo)	2	5	229
9	HarashiMarufuji (Harashima and Naomichi Marufuji)	1	4	217
10	MoroToba (Seiya Morohashi and Thanomsak Toba)	2	5	210
11	ShunMao (Mao and Shunma Katsumata)	2	7	201
12	Hentai Big Boss (Sanshiro Takagi and Munenori Sawa)	1	11	199
13	Strong BJ (Daisuke Sekimoto and Yuji Okabayashi)	1	4	189
14	Burning (Tetsuya Endo and Yuki Iino)	1	3	185
15	Kudo and Yasu Urano	1	5	172
16	Eruption (Kazusada Higuchi and Yukio Sakaguchi)	1	2	168
17	Yankee Nichokenju (Isami Kodaka and Yuko Miyamoto)	1	6	161
18	Mikami and Takashi Sasaki	1	2	155
19	Strange Love Connection (Mao and Kanon)	1	4	153
20	Mikami and Tatsumi Fujinami	1	3	141
21	Nurunuru Brothers (Michael Nakazawa and Tomomitsu Matsunaga)	1	6	139
22	Crying Wolf (Yasu Urano and Yuji Hino)	2	4	133
22	Daichi Kakimoto and Kota Ibushi	1	2	133
24	Seiya Morohashi and Poco Takanashi	1	2	129
25	Fantômes Dramatic (Chris Brookes and Harashima)	1	3	128
26	The Apex (Yuki Iino and Yukio Naya)	1	5	127
27	Harimau (Kazusada Higuchi and Naomi Yoshimura)	1	2	121
28	UraShima (Harashima and Yasu Urano)	1	4	117
29	Team Karamawari; Takashi Sasaki and Thanomsak Toba	1	2	112
30	Masakatsu Funaki and Yukio Sakaguchi	1	2	110
31	Romance Dawn (Soma Takao and Shota)	1	3	109
32	The37Kamiina (Konosuke Takeshita and Shunma Katsumata)	1	2	108
33	Hikaru Sato and Yukio Sakaguchi	1	3	107
34	Italian Four Horsemen (Francesco Togo and Piza Michinoku)	1	0	105
35	Disaster Box (Harashima and Naomi Yoshimura)	2	1	104
35	Daisuke Sasaki and Shuji Ishikawa	1	3	104
35	Granma (Gentaro and Yasu Urano)	1	3	104
38	Astronauts (Fuminori Abe and Takuya Nomura)	1	5	101
38	Aloha World Order (Prince Togo and Antonio "The Dragon" Honda)	1	1	101
40	From the Northern Country (Antonio Honda and Daisuke Sasaki)	1	3	98
41	Sanshiro Takagi and Tomohiko Hashimoto	1	2	97
42	SekiGuchi (Daisuke Sekimoto and Kazusada Higuchi)	1	2	93
43	Tomohiko Hashimoto and Seiya Morohashi	1	1	92
44	YaroZ (Shigehiro Irie and Kazusada Higuchi)	1	3	91
45	Disaster Box (Toru Owashi and Harashima)	1	1	90
46	Keisuke Ishii and Shigehiro Irie	1	3	82
46	The37Kamiina (Mao and To-y)	1	1	82
48	Shirojiro (Danshoku Dino and Shiro Koshinaka)	1	2	77
48	Toru Owashi and Darskide Hero!	1	1	77
48	Hero! and Kudo	2	0	77
51	Smile Pissari (Harashima and Yuji Okabayashi)	1	1	76
52	MikaUchuu (Mikami and Super Uchuu Power)	2	1	74
53	Golden☆Storm Riders (Daisuke Sasaki and Kota Ibushi)	1	1	71
54	Far East Connection (Tomohiko Hashimoto and Nobutaka Moribe)	1	1	68
55	Homoiro Clover Z (Kudo and Makoto Oishi)	1	3	63
55	Calamari Drunken Kings (Chris Brookes and Masahiro Takanashi)	1	2	63
55	Mao and Asuka	1	0	63
58	Bad Commis (Ken Ohka and Kai)	1	0	56
58	Damnation (Daisuke Sasaki and Tetsuya Endo)	1	1	56
60	Paleyouth † (Takeshi Masada and Yuya Koroku)	1	2	55+
61	Damnation T.A (Daisuke Sasaki and MJ Paul)	1	0	49
62	Shinya Aoki and Junta Miyawaki	1	1	47
62	Gay Machine Guns (Danshoku Dino and Glenn "Q" Spectre)	1	0	47
64	Smile Yankee (Harashima and Yuko Miyamoto)	1	1	42
65	X-RAB (Gentaro and Yoshiya)	1	1	41
65	Schadenfreude International (Chris Brookes and Takeshi Masada)	1	0	41
67	Konosuke Takeshita and "Speedball" Mike Bailey	1	1	36
68	Masa Takanashi and Daisuke Sekimoto	1	0	35
68	New World Japan (Sanshiro Takagi and Soma Takao)	1	4	35
70	Nosawa and Takashi Sasaki	1	1	33
71	Hero! Gundam (Harashima and Hero!)	1	1	30
71	Sanshiro Takagi and Ryuji Ito	1	0	30
73	Omega (Yuji Hino and Makoto Oishi)	1	0	27
74	Damnation (Tetsuya Endo and Mad Paulie)	1	0	26
75	Damnation (Minoru Fujita and Kanon)	1	0	25
76	Damnation T.A (Daisuke Sasaki and Kanon)	1	0	17
77	Homoiro Clover Z (Kota Ibushi and Danshoku Dino)	1	0	15
77	TKG48 (Munenori Sawa and Shigehiro Irie)	1	0	15
79	New No Fear (Yoshihiro Takayama and Danshoku Dino)	1	0	10
80	Kenny Omega and Michael Nakazawa	1	0	5
81	Shoichi Ichimiya and Seiya Morohashi	1	0	4

=== By wrestler ===
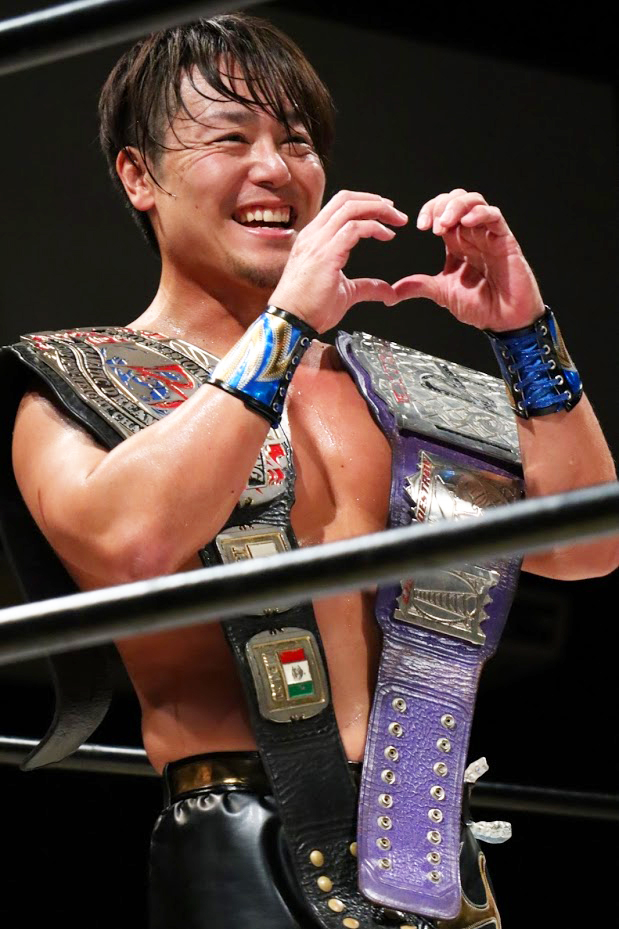
Harashima is the record-holding, 12-time, and longest individual combined champion at 1,060 days and counting.

Rank	Wrestler	No. of reigns	Combined defenses	Combined days
1	Hero!/Darkside Hero!/Harashima	12	17	958
2	Mao	6	15	739
3	Daisuke Sasaki	7	17	682
4	Mikami	6	11	628
5	Thanomsak Toba	5	12	580
6	Kota Ibushi	5	10	570
7	Takashi Sasaki	5	5	540
8	Yasu Urano	5	12	526
9	Naomi Yoshimura	4	10	521
10	Tetsuya Endo	5	9	496
11	Kazusada Higuchi	4	9	473
12	Francesco Togo/Prince Togo	3	9	469
13	Yukio Sakaguchi	3	7	444
14	Soma Takao	3	16	434
15	Gentaro	4	7	385
16	Konosuke Takeshita	4	8	373
17	Sanshiro Takagi	4	14	361
18	Kenny Omega	3	7	356
19	Seiya Morohashi	5	7	343
20	Nobutaka Moribe/Mori Bernard	2	9	331
21	Daisuke Sekimoto	3	6	317
22	Kudo	4	8	312
23	Yuki Iino	2	8	312
24	Shunma Katsumata	3	9	309
25	Yuki Ueno	1	7	296
26	Mike Bailey	2	4	276
27	Yuji Okabayashi	2	5	265
28	Tomohiko Hashimoto	3	3	257
29	Chris Brookes	3	5	232
30	Poco Takanashi/Masa Takanashi/Masahiro Takanashi	3	4	226
31	Naomichi Marufuji	1	4	217
32	Munenori Sawa	2	11	216
33	Yuko Miyamoto	2	7	203
34	Antonio "The Dragon" Honda/Antonio Honda	2	4	199
35	Kanon	3	4	195
36	Shigehiro Irie	3	6	188
37	Toru Owashi	2	2	167
38	Isami Kodaka	1	6	161
39	Yuji Hino	3	4	160
40	Danshoku Dino	4	2	149
41	Michael Nakazawa	2	6	141
41	Tatsumi Fujinami	1	3	141
43	Tomomitsu Matsunaga	1	3	139
44	Daichi Kakimoto	1	2	133
45	Yukio Naya	1	5	127
46	Masakatsu Funaki	1	2	110
47	Shota	1	3	109
48	Hikaru Sato	1	3	107
49	Piza Michinoku	1	0	105
50	Shuji Ishikawa	1	3	104
51	Fuminori Abe	1	5	101
51	Takuya Nomura	1	5	101
53	Takeshi Masada †	2	2	96+
54	Makoto Oishi	2	3	90
55	Keisuke Ishii	1	3	82
55	To-y	1	1	82
57	Shiro Koshinaka	1	2	77
58	Mad Paulie/MJ Paul	2	0	75
59	Super Uchuu Power	2	1	74
60	Asuka	1	0	63
61	Kai	1	0	56
61	Ken Ohka	1	0	56
63	Yuya Koroku †	1	2	55+
64	Hero!/Minoru Fujita	2	1	55
65	Shinya Aoki	1	1	47
65	Junta Miyawaki	1	1	47
65	Glenn "Q" Spectre	1	1	47
68	Yoshiya	1	0	41
69	Nosawa	1	1	33
70	Yoshihiro Takayama	1	0	10
71	Shoichi Ichimiya	1	0	4

== See also ==
- Professional wrestling in Japan
