= Saki Akai =

Japanese professional wrestler

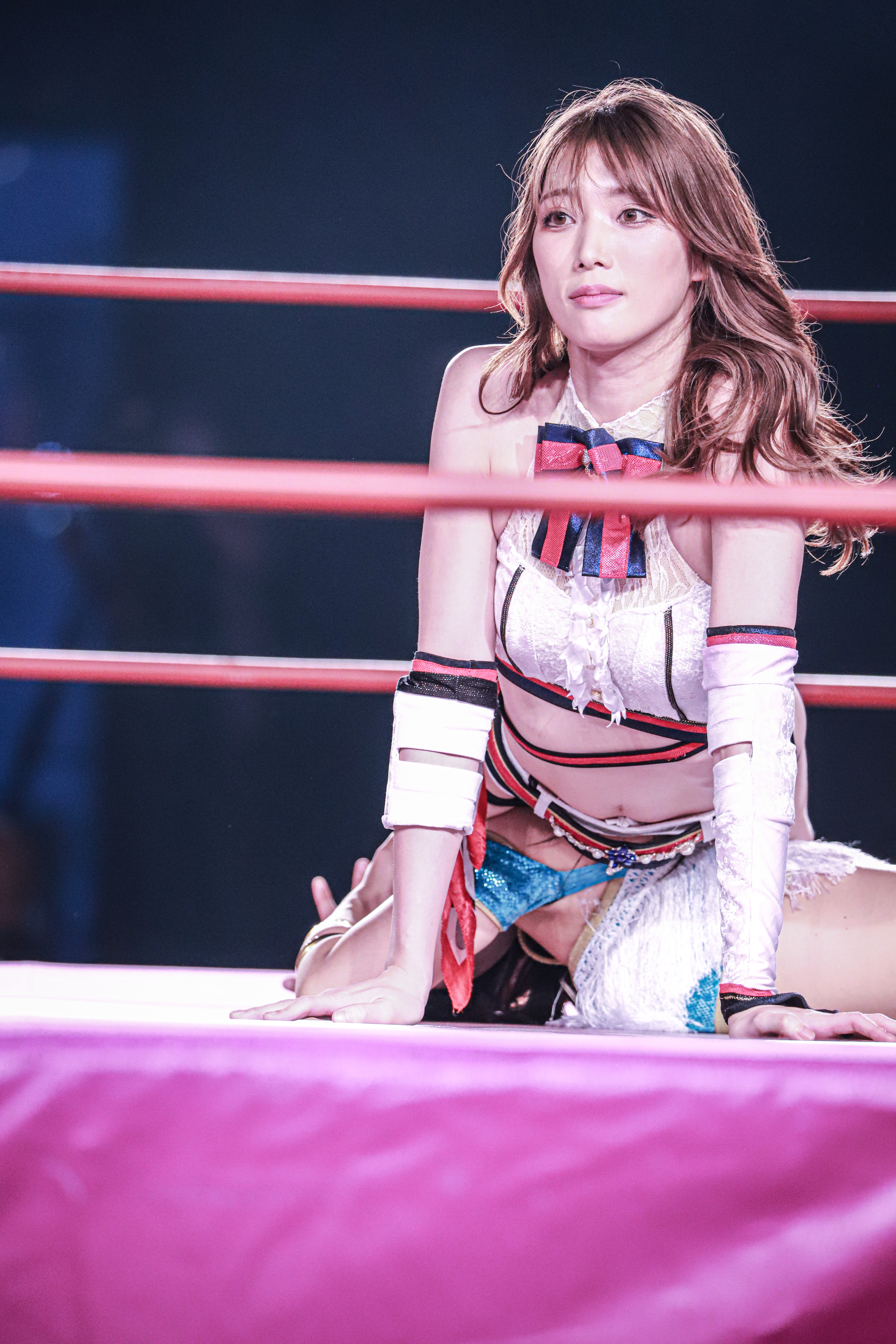
- Akai in July 2022

Personal information
- Born: January 24, 1987 (age 39) Kyoto, Japan
- Parent: Hidekazu Akai

Professional wrestling career
- Ring name(s): Saki Akamiya; Sukeban Saki; Sakisama; Saki; Saki Akai
- Billed height: 1.74 m (5 ft 9 in)
- Billed weight: 53 kg (117 lb)
- Trained by: Masahiro Takanashi; Cherry
- Debut: 2013
- Retired: November 12, 2023

Saki Akai (赤井沙希, Akai Saki) is a Japanese retired professional wrestler, idol, model, and tarento (television personality), currently working for the Japanese professional wrestling promotion DDT Pro-Wrestling (DDT) and its sister joshi promotion Tokyo Joshi Pro Wrestling (TJPW). Her father is former professional boxer Hidekazu Akai.

== Professional wrestling career ==
=== Independent circuit (2011–2023) ===
Akai made her professional wrestling debut at the Ice Ribbon 1st Anniversary Show on June 1, 2011, where she teamed up with Hikaru Shida and wrestled Tsukasa Fujimoto and Makoto in a time limit draw. She is known for tenures with various professional wrestling promotions such as Tokyo Joshi Pro Wrestling, and at the TJP Tokyo Joshi Pro '17 show on January 4, she defeated Miyu Yamashita. She also worked for World Wonder Ring Stardom, and on the Year End Climax on December 23, 2014, she unsuccessfully challenged Yoshiko for the World of Stardom Championship. During her time with Seadlinnng, she worked with various wrestlers such as in the SEAdLINNNG/Yoshiko Produce show on July 26, 2020 where she teamed up with Aja Kong and Asuka to defeat Ayame Sasamura, Hiroyo Matsumoto and Yoshiko in a six-woman tag team match. While competing for Pro Wrestling Wave, she scored a victory against Syuri and Sakura Hirota while teaming up with Yumi Ohka at Sunday WAVE vol.37 on February 23, 2020. At the Wizard of OZ 2017 show of Oz Academy on January 25, 2017, she teamed up with Aja Kong and Rina Yamashita to defeat Ozaki-gun (Maya Yukihi, Mayumi Ozaki and Yumi Ohka in another six-woman tag team match.

=== DDT Pro-Wrestling and Tokyo Joshi Pro Wrestling (2013–2023) ===
Saki Akai worked most of her career for DDT Pro-Wrestling (DDT) and Tokyo Joshi Pro Wrestling (TJPW). In TJPW, she was a former Princess Tag Team Champion under the name of Sakisama and teaming up with Azusa Christie as NEO Biishiki-gun to defeat MiraClians (Shoko Nakajima and Yuka Sakazaki) for the titles at "Let's Go! Go! If You Go! When You Go! If You Get Lost You Just Go To Nerima!" on February 3, 2018. In DDT, she worked as a part of the Eruption stable and paired with her stablemates Yukio Sakaguchi and Kazusada Higuchi to become KO-D 6-Man Tag Team Champions by defeating #DamnHearts (Tetsuya Endo, T-Hawk and El Lindaman) in a six-person intergender tag team match at "DDT TV Show! #7" on June 20, 2020. She is a former multiple time Ironman Heavymetalweight Champion, last time winning it at DDT New Year Special 2020 on January 3, in a gauntlet battle royal also involving the champion, Omochi, Antonio Honda, Gorgeous Matsuno, Kazuki Hirata, Keigo Nakamura, Mizuki Watase, Toru Owashi and Yuki Iino. Pro Wrestling Illustrated ranked her No. 478 in the top 500 singles wrestlers of 2020. At TJPW Still Incomplete on April 17, 2021, Akai won the Princess Tag Team Championship alongside Mei Suruga as Neo Biishiki-gun after defeating Bakuretsu Sisters (Nodoka Tenma and Yuki Aino). Akai and Suruga lost the Princess Tag Team Championship to the team of the Magical Sugar Rabbits (Yuka Sakazaki and Mizuki) on October 10, 2021 at Wrestle Princess II. On November 12, 2023 at DDT Ultimate Party 2023 event, Saki Akai officially wrapped up her in-ring career. Dating back to May, Akai has been on her retirement tour and that concluded with a six-person tag that featured herself and fellow members of Eruption, Yukio Sakaguchi and Hideki Okatani taking on Naomichi Marufuji, Miyu Yamashita and Kazusada Higuchi and her team losing. After the bout concluded, she received a retirement ceremony where various superstars such as Hiroshi Tanahashi, Togi Makabe, Genichiro Tenryu and Shinsuke Nakamura reached out via video to pay homage for her career. Upon Akai's retirement, the KO-D 6-Man Tag Team Championship were subsequently vacated by herself, Yukio Sakaguchi and Hideki Okatani.

== Acting career ==
Akai is signed to the Japanese talent agency Platinum Production. She appeared in several movies such as the 2018 film Lady Ninja:Blue Shadow, in which she played the role of Konatsu Kujo, and Gianto Monster Mono (2016) in which portrayed Lisa. She also played a fictionalized version of herself working as a hostess in the 2016 video game Yakuza 6: The Song of Life.

== Championships and accomplishments ==
- All Japan Pro Wrestling
  - AJPW TV Six-Man Tag Team Championship (1 time) – with Yukio Sakaguchi and Hideki Okatani
- Best Body Japan Pro-Wrestling
  - BBW Women's Championship (1 time)
- DDT Pro-Wrestling
  - KO-D 6-Man Tag Team Championship (2 times) – with Yukio Sakaguchi and Kazusada Higuchi (1) and Yukio Sakaguchi and Hideki Okatani (1)
  - Ironman Heavymetalweight Championship (24 times)
- Tokyo Joshi Pro Wrestling
  - Princess Tag Team Championship (4 times) – with Azusa Christie (1), Misao (1), Mei Saint-Michel (1) and Yuki Arai (1) (Note: Saki Akai's first two reigns were when the championship was called the Tokyo Princess Tag Team Championship.)
  - "Futari wa Princess" Max Heart Tournament (2021) – with Mei Saint-Michel
- Tokyo Sports
  - Newcomer Award (2014)
- Pro Wrestling Illustrated
  - Ranked No. 394 of the top 500 singles wrestlers in the PWI 500 in 2022
