= Sweet Dreams! 2024 =

2024 DDT Pro-Wrestling event

- Promotional poster featuring Yuki Ueno and Yukio Naya
- Promotion: CyberFight
- Brand: DDT
- Date: January 28, 2024
- City: Tokyo, Japan
- Venue: Korakuen Hall
- Attendance: 1,120

Pay-per-view chronology
← Previous; Ultimate Party 2023	Next → Into The Fight 2024

Sweet Dreams! chronology
← Previous; 2023	Next → —

Sweet Dreams! 2024 was a professional wrestling event promoted by CyberFight's sub-brand DDT Pro-Wrestling (DDT). It took place on January 28, 2024, in Tokyo, Japan, at the Korakuen Hall. The event aired on CyberAgent's AbemaTV online linear television service and CyberFight's streaming service Wrestle Universe.

Eight matches were contested at the event, including one on the pre-show. The main event saw Yuki Ueno defeat Yukio Naya to retain the KO-D Openweight Championship.

== Production ==
=== Background ===
The event featured eight professional wrestling matches that resulted from scripted storylines, where wrestlers portrayed villains, heroes, or less distinguishable characters in the scripted events that built tension and culminated in a wrestling match or series of matches.

=== Event ===
The show started with the ten-man confrontation of Sanshiro Takagi, Toru Owashi, Akito, Shinichiro Kawamatsu and Yuni who took on the team of Harashima, Antonio Honda, Takeshi Masada, Kazuma Sumi and Tomoya in a losing effort.

The first main card bout saw Daisuke Sasaki, Kanon and Bryan Keith picking up a victory over Tetsuya Endo, Yuki Iino and Rukiya in six-man tag team action. Next up, Yukio Sakaguchi defeated Hideki Okatani in singles competition in which was billed as Sakaguchi's last Korakuen Hall performance before his retirement which was scheduled for February 7, 2024. In the fourth bout, Mao and NJPW's Taka Michinoku outmatched Chris Brookes and Masahiro Takanashi in tag team action. Next up, Shunma Katsumata defeated Kazuki Hirata to win the DDT Extreme Championship for the third time in his career, ending Hirata's reign at 217 days and four successful defenses. Next up, Jun Akiyama, Danshoku Dino and Makoto Oishi defeated Hikaru Sato, Kazusada Higuchi and Ryo Kawamura to secure the second consecutive defense of the KO-D 6-Man Tag Team Championship. In the semi main event, All Elite Wrestling's Konosuke Takeshita defeated Naruki Doi in singles competition. During the event, Shuji Ishikawa returned to DDT Pro-Wrestling.

In the main event, Yuki Ueno defeated 2023 D-Oh Grand Prix winner Yukio Naya to secure the first defense of the KO-D Openweight Championship in that respective reign. After the bout concluded, Danshoku Dino laid a title challenge to Ueno which was scheduled for February 14, 2024.

== Results ==
No.	Results	Stipulations	Times
1^{P}	Harashima, Schadenfreude International (Antonio Honda and Takeshi Masada), Kazuma Sumi and Tomoya defeated Sanshiro Takagi, Toru Owashi, Akito, Shinichiro Kawamatsu and Yuni by pinfall	Ten-man tag team match	7:07
2	Damnation T.A (Daisuke Sasaki and Kanon) and Bryan Keith (with MJ Paul) defeated Burning (Tetsuya Endo and Yuki Iino) and Rukiya by pinfall	Six-man tag team match	8:39
3	Yukio Sakaguchi defeated Hideki Okatani by pinfall	Singles match	5:42
4	Mao and Taka Michinoku defeated Calamari Drunken Kings (Chris Brookes and Masahiro Takanashi) by pinfall	Tag team match	8:45
5	Shunma Katsumata defeated Kazuki Hirata (c) by pinfall	Toy Kojima Challenge Death Match for the DDT Extreme Championship	8:33
6	D・O・A (Jun Akiyama, Danshoku Dino and Makoto Oishi) (c) defeated Hikaru Sato, Kazusada Higuchi and Ryo Kawamura by pinfall	Six-man tag team match for the KO-D 6-Man Tag Team Championship	8:20
7	Konosuke Takeshita defeated Naruki Doi by pinfall	Singles match	10:58
8	Yuki Ueno (c) defeated Yukio Naya by pinfall	Singles match for the KO-D Openweight Championship	23:35
(c) / – the champion(s) heading into the match; P / – the match was broadcast on the pre-show
