= DDT Sweet Dreams! =

Sweet Dreams!
- Promotions: DDT Pro-Wrestling (2011–2020); CyberFight (2022–2024)
- Brand(s): DDT Pro-Wrestling (2022–2024)
- First event: Sweet Dreams! 2011
- Last event: Sweet Dreams! 2024

Sweet Dreams (often stylized as Sweet Dreams!) was a recurring professional wrestling event held annually by DDT Pro-Wrestling (DDT) in late January at Korakuen Hall in Tokyo. Originally held by DDT as an independent promotion from 2011 to 2020, it was then held by CyberFight as a DDT-branded event from 2022 to 2024. The 2018 edition was replaced by the final of the inaugural D-Oh Grand Prix, and no edition was held in 2021.

== History ==
From 2011 to 2020, Sweet Dreams was produced by DDT Pro-Wrestling, an independent promotion founded in 1997 by Shintaro Muto and Pro Wrestling Crusaders alumni Kyohei Mikami, Kazushige Nosawa and Sanshiro Takagi. In 2020, DDT and its subsidiaries merged with Pro Wrestling Noah into a new company called CyberFight owned by the digital advertising company CyberAgent, with DDT and Noah persisting as separate brands under the CyberFight umbrella. Sweet Dreams was then held from 2022 to 2024 as a DDT branded event.

== Events ==
#	Event	Date	City	Venue	Main event	Ref.
1	Sweet Dreams! 2011	January 30, 2011	Tokyo, Japan	Korakuen Hall	Dick Togo (lineal) vs. Antonio Honda (interim) to unify the KO-D Openweight Championship	
2	Sweet Dreams! 2012	January 29, 2012	Tokyo, Japan	Korakuen Hall	Kudo (c) vs. Danshoku Dino for the KO-D Openweight Championship	
3	Sweet Dreams! 2013	January 27, 2013	Tokyo, Japan	Korakuen Hall	Kenny Omega (KO-D) vs. Isami Kodaka (Extreme) in a Title vs. title match for the KO-D Openweight and DDT Extreme Championships	
4	Sweet Dreams! 2014	January 26, 2014	Tokyo, Japan	Korakuen Hall	Harashima (c) vs. Shigehiro Irie for the KO-D Openweight Championship	
5	Sweet Dreams 2015	January 25, 2015	Tokyo, Japan	Korakuen Hall	Harashima and Happy Motel (Konosuke Takeshita and Tetsuya Endo) vs. Kota Ibushi and Strong BJ (Daisuke Sekimoto and Yuji Okabayashi)	
6	Sweet Dreams! 2016	January 31, 2016	Tokyo, Japan	Korakuen Hall	Isami Kodaka (c) vs. Masa Takanashi for the KO-D Openweight Championship	
7	Sweet Dreams! 2017	January 29, 2017	Tokyo, Japan	Korakuen Hall	Harashima (c) vs. Daisuke Sasaki for the KO-D Openweight Championship	
8	Sweet Dreams! 2019	January 27, 2019	Tokyo, Japan	Korakuen Hall	Daisuke Sasaki and Harashima vs. Konosuke Takeshita and Shinya Aoki	
9	Sweet Dreams! 2020	January 26, 2020	Tokyo, Japan	Korakuen Hall	Harashima (c) vs. Masato Tanaka for the KO-D Openweight Championship	
10	Sweet Dreams! 2022	January 30, 2022	Tokyo, Japan	Korakuen Hall	Daisuke Sasaki (c) vs. Minoru Fujita for the DDT Universal Championship	
11	Sweet Dreams! 2023	January 29, 2023	Tokyo, Japan	Korakuen Hall	Kazusada Higuchi (c) vs. Yuji Hino for the KO-D Openweight Championship	
12	Sweet Dreams! 2024	January 28, 2024	Tokyo, Japan	Korakuen Hall	Yuki Ueno (c) vs. Yukio Naya for the KO-D Openweight Championship	
(c) – refers to the champion(s) heading into the match

== Results ==
=== 2011 ===
Sweet Dreams! 2011
- Promotion: DDT Pro-Wrestling
- Date: January 30, 2011
- City: Tokyo, Japan
- Venue: Korakuen Hall
- Attendance: 1,428

Event chronology
← Previous; Never Mind 2010	Next → Into the Fight 2011

Sweet Dreams! chronology
← Previous; First	Next → 2012

No.	Results	Stipulations	Times
1	Akito defeated Kazuki Hirata	Singles match	8:18
2	Granma (Gentaro and Yasu Urano) defeated Mikami and Rion Mizuki	Tag team match	10:29
3	Shit Hart♥Foundation (Soma Takao and Tomomitsu Matsunaga) defeated Hikaru Sato and Daisuke Sasaki	Tag team match	12:58
4	Keisuke Ishii won by last eliminating Yukihiro Abe (Note: Order of elimination: Hoshitango, Minoru Fujita, Michael Nakazawa, Thanomsak Toba, Danshoku Dino, Makoto Oishi, DJ Nira, and Yukihiro Abe.)	Nine-man battle royal for a future sponsored show	12:03
5	Golden☆Lovers (Kota Ibushi and Kenny Omega) defeated Harashima and Kudo	Tag team match	16:55
6	Dick Togo (34th champion) defeated Antonio Honda (interim champion)	Singles match to unify the KO-D Openweight Championship	26:24

=== 2012 ===
Sweet Dreams! 2012
- Promotion: DDT Pro-Wrestling
- Date: January 29, 2012
- City: Tokyo, Japan
- Venue: Korakuen Hall
- Attendance: 1,388

Event chronology
← Previous; Dramatic 2012 January Special	Next → Into the Fight 2012

Sweet Dreams! chronology
← Previous; 2011	Next → 2013

No.	Results	Stipulations	Times
1^{D}	DJ Nira and Shota defeated Gorgeous Matsuno and Rion Mizuki	Tag team match	7:41
2	Sanshiro Takagi and Soma Takao defeated Tomomitsu Matsunaga and Hoshitango	Tag team match	6:46
3	Masa Takanashi and Daisuke Sasaki defeated Shigehiro Irie and Poison Julie Sawada, and Dohentai-dan (Hikaru Sato and Michael Nakazawa) (Note: Order of elimination: Dohentai-dan (Hikaru Sato and Michael Nakazawa), and Shigehiro Irie and Poison Julie Sawada.)	Three-way tag team elimination match	7:32
4	Crying Wolf (Yasu Urano, A. Yazawa and Keita Yano) defeated Homoiro Clover Z (Makoto Oishi, Akito and Hiroshi Fukuda)	Rock and Roll Deathmatch	14:12
5	Yuji Hino defeated Keisuke Ishii	Singles match	10:46
6	Kenny Omega defeated Harashima	Singles match	21:09
7	Danshoku Dino defeated Kudo (c)	Singles match for the KO-D Openweight Championship	17:37
(c) / – the champion(s) heading into the match; D / – this was a dark match

=== 2013 ===
Sweet Dreams! 2013
- Promotion: DDT Pro-Wrestling
- Date: January 27, 2013
- City: Tokyo, Japan
- Venue: Korakuen Hall
- Attendance: 1,542

Event chronology
← Previous; Never Mind 2012	Next → Into The Fight 2013

Sweet Dreams! chronology
← Previous; 2012	Next → 2014

No.	Results	Stipulations	Times
1	Team Castle (Makoto Oishi and Akito) defeated Tetsuya Endo and Daichi Kazato	Tag team match	7:14
2	Gota Ihashi defeated Hiroshi Fukuda, Michael Nakazawa, Hoshitango, Batten Tamagawa and DJ Nira	Five-on-one handicap match	5:43
3	Ura-Shima-Fuma (Harashima, Yasu Urano and Fuma) defeated Mikami, Hikaru Sato and Masa Takanashi	Six-man tag team match	10:53
4	Danshoku Dino and Yoshiko defeated Sanshiro Takagi and Yuzuki Aikawa	Tag team match	10:32
5	Kota Ibushi defeated Konosuke Takeshita	Singles match	11:48
6	Monster Army (Antonio Honda, Daisuke Sasaki and Yuji Hino) defeated Team Dream Futures (Keisuke Ishii, Soma Takao and Shigehiro Irie) (c)	Six-man tag team match for the KO-D 6-Man Tag Team Championship	10:32
7	Kenny Omega (Openweight) defeated Isami Kodaka (Extreme)	Winner takes all match for the KO-D Openweight Championship and DDT Extreme Championship	23:14
(c) / – the champion(s) heading into the match

=== 2014 ===
Sweet Dreams! 2014
- Promotion: DDT Pro-Wrestling
- Date: January 26, 2014
- City: Tokyo, Japan
- Venue: Korakuen Hall
- Attendance: 1,929

Event chronology
← Previous; Never Mind 2013	Next → Into The Fight 2014

Sweet Dreams! chronology
← Previous; 2013	Next → 2015

No.	Results	Stipulations	Times
1	Monster Army (Antonio Honda and Daisuke Sasaki) defeated Team Dream Futures (Keisuke Ishii and Soma Takao)	Tag team match	10:54
2	Masa Takanashi (c) defeated Mikami, Michael Nakazawa, Tomomitsu Matsunaga, DJ Nira, Yasu Urano, Gota Ihashi, Guanchulo, Kazuki Hirata, and Hoshitango	Ironman Battle Royal for the Ironman Heavymetalweight Championship	10:00
3	Toru Owashi and Yoshiko defeated Makoto Oishi and Saki Akai	Tag team match	9:05
4	Kudo defeated Danshoku Dino	Singles match	13:27
5	Sanshiro Takagi and Hikaru Sato defeated Yukio Sakaguchi and Akito	Singles match	15:29
6	Golden☆Lovers (Kota Ibushi and Kenny Omega) defeated Yankee Nichokenju (Isami Kodaka and Yuko Miyamoto) (c), and Konosuke Takeshita and Testuya Endo	Three-way tag team match for the KO-D Tag Team Championship	16:38
7	Harashima (c) defeated Shigehiro Irie	Singles match for the KO-D Openweight Championship	21:42
(c) / – the champion(s) heading into the match

=== 2015 ===
Sweet Dreams 2015
- Promotion: DDT Pro-Wrestling
- Date: January 25, 2015
- City: Tokyo, Japan
- Venue: Korakuen Hall
- Attendance: 2,000

Event chronology
← Previous; Never Mind 2014	Next → Saitama Super DDT 2015

Sweet Dreams! chronology
← Previous; 2014	Next → 2016

No.	Results	Stipulations	Times
1^{D}	Hoshitango defeated Hiroshi Fukuda	Singles match	3:21
2	Shuten Doji (Kudo, Yukio Sakaguchi and Masa Takanashi) defeated Gorgeous Matsuno, DJ Nira and Gota Ihashi	Six-man tag team match	6:53
3	Hikaru Sato won by last eliminating Shunma Katsumata (Note: Order of entrance: Soma Takao, Tomomitsu Matsunaga, Shunma Katsumata, Yasu Urano, Saki Akai, Bernard Ackah, and Hikaru Sato. Order of elimination: Saki Akai, Bernard Ackah, Tomomitsu Matsunaga, Yasu Urano, Soma Takao, and Shunma Katsumata.)	Seven-person rumble rules battle royal	9:06
4	Mikami and Shuji Ishikawa defeated Team Dream Futures (Keisuke Ishii and Shigehiro Irie), and Golden☆Storm Riders (Daisuke Sasaki and Suguru Miyatake)	Three-way tag team match	10:40
5	Antonio Honda and Great Kojika (with Yoshihiko) defeated T2Hii (Toru Owashi and Kazuki Hirata)	Tag team match	11:13
6	Super Sasadango Machine defeated Sanshiro Takagi	Singles match	4:14
7	Akito (c) defeated Makoto Oishi	Singles match for the DDT Extreme Championship	15:01
8	Kota Ibushi and Strong BJ (Daisuke Sekimoto and Yuji Okabayashi) defeated Harashima and Happy Motel (Konosuke Takeshita and Tetsuya Endo)	Six-man tag team match	23:51
(c) / – the champion(s) heading into the match; D / – this was a dark match

=== 2016 ===
Sweet Dreams! 2016
- Promotion: DDT Pro-Wrestling
- Date: January 31, 2016
- City: Tokyo, Japan
- Venue: Korakuen Hall
- Attendance: 1,658

Event chronology
← Previous; Never Mind 2015	Next → Into The Fight 2016

Sweet Dreams! chronology
← Previous; 2015	Next → 2017

No.	Results	Stipulations	Times
1^{D}	Sanshiro Takagi vs. Kenso ended in a draw (16–16)	60-minute Falls Count Anywhere Iron Man match	1:00:00
2^{D}	Gota Ihashi (c) and Tomomitsu Matsunaga defeated Hiroshi Fukuda and Mizuki Watase	Tag team match for the King of Dark Championship (Note: The Iron Man match started ten minutes before the doors opened and continued throughout the second match, which Takagi and Kenso unofficially joined while their match was still going on, essentially turning it into a six-man tag team match.); As a result, Watase won the title.	3:42
3	Daisuke Sasaki and Guanchulo defeated Shunma Katsumata and Kota Umeda	Tag team match	10:11
4	Makoto Oishi and Cherry defeated Saki Akai and DJ Nira	Tag team match	6:18
5	#OhkaEmpire (Danshoku Dino and Super Sasadango Machine) vs. T2Hii (Toru Owashi and Kazuki Hirata) ended in a draw	The Only One Hole in the World rules match	11:33
6	Happy Motel (Antonio Honda, Konosuke Takeshita and Tetsuya Endo) defeated Team Dream Futures (Keisuke Ishii and Soma Takao) and Kouki Iwasaki	Six-man tag team match	10:19
7	Kendo Kashin (c) and Gouma Ryu defeated Yasu Urano and Akito	Singles match with partners for the DDT Extreme Championship	10:41
8	Shigehiro Irie defeated Harashima, Yukio Sakaguchi, and Kazusada Higuchi	Four-way match	10:50
9	Isami Kodaka (c) defeated Masa Takanashi	Singles match for the KO-D Openweight Championship	27:03
(c) / – the champion(s) heading into the match; D / – this was a dark match

=== 2017 ===
Sweet Dreams! 2017
- Promotion: DDT Pro-Wrestling
- Date: January 29, 2017
- City: Tokyo, Japan
- Venue: Korakuen Hall
- Attendance: 1,520

Event chronology
← Previous; Never Mind 2016	Next → Into The Fight 2017

Sweet Dreams! chronology
← Previous; 2016	Next → 2019

No.	Results	Stipulations	Times
1^{D}	Gota Ihashi defeated Nobuhiro Shimatani (c)	Singles match for the King of Dark Championship; As a result, Shimatani retained the title.	4:54
2	Antonio Honda, Guanchulo and NωA (Shunma Katsumata and Mao) defeated T2Hii (Sanshiro Takagi, Toru Owashi and Kazuki Hirata) and Saki Akai	Lucha Libre Rules Scramble Bunkhouse Glasses Deathmatch	9:11
3	Shuten Doji (Yukio Sakaguchi and Masahiro Takanashi) defeated Kazusada Higuchi and Kouki Iwasaki, and Akito and Tomomitsu Matsunaga	Three-way tag team match	6:00
4	Damnation (Tetsuya Endo and Mad Paulie) defeated Soma Takao and Mizuki Watase	Tag team match	9:05
5	Yoshihiro Takayama and Dick Togo defeated Danshoku Dino and Makoto Oishi	Tag team match	12:56
6	Keisuke Ishii (c) defeated Yasu Urano	Singles match for the World Junior Heavyweight Championship	11:43
7	Konosuke Takeshita defeated Kudo	KO-D Openweight Championship Contendership Tournament final	18:42
8	Harashima (c) defeated Daisuke Sasaki	Singles match for the KO-D Openweight Championship	21:53
(c) / – the champion(s) heading into the match; D / – this was a dark match

=== 2019 ===
Sweet Dreams! 2019
- Promotion: DDT Pro-Wrestling
- Date: January 27, 2019
- City: Tokyo, Japan
- Venue: Korakuen Hall
- Attendance: 1,040

Event chronology
← Previous; D-Oh Grand Prix 2019 the Final!!	Next → Judgement 2019

Sweet Dreams! chronology
← Previous; 2017	Next → 2020

No.	Results	Stipulations	Times
1	Akito and Space Monkey defeated Jason "The Gift" Kincaid and Antonio Honda	Tag team match	10:07
2	Asuka won by last eliminating Kazuki Hirata (Note: Order of elimination: Chinsuke Nakamura (c), Kikutaro, Toru Owashi, Kazusada Higuchi, Yuki Iino, Keisuke Okuda, and Kazuki Hirata.)	Battle royal for the Ironman Heavymetalweight Championship	9:53
3	Yukio Sakaguchi defeated El Lindaman	Singles match	8:42
4	Damnation (Soma Takao, Tetsuya Endo and Mad Paulie) and Takumi Iroha defeated Sanshiro Takagi, Makoto Oishi, Mizuki Watase and Yuki Ueno	Eight-person tag team match	11:22
5	Masahiro Takanashi defeated Mao and Cima	Three-way match	10:41
6	Shuji Ishikawa defeated Kota Umeda	Singles match	13:02
7	Daisuke Sasaki and Harashima defeated Konosuke Takeshita and Shinya Aoki	Tag team match	22:43

=== 2020 ===
Sweet Dreams! 2020
- Promotion: DDT Pro-Wrestling
- Date: January 26, 2020
- City: Tokyo, Japan
- Venue: Korakuen Hall
- Attendance: 1,278

Event chronology
← Previous; D-Oh Grand Prix 2020 the Final!!	Next → Judgement 2020

Sweet Dreams! chronology
← Previous; 2019	Next → 2022

No.	Results	Stipulations	Times
1	Damnation (Soma Takao, Mad Paulie and Nobuhiro Shimatani) defeated Masahiro Takanashi, Mizuki Watase and Keigo Nakamura	Six-man tag team match	5:00
2	Mao and Hiroshi Yamato defeated Toru Owashi and Super Sasadango Machine	Tag team match	7:18
3	Eruption (Kazusada Higuchi, Yukio Sakaguchi and Saki Akai) defeated All Out (Konosuke Takeshita, Akito and Shunma Katsumata)	Six-person tag team match	8:06
4	Yasu Urano, Daisuke Sasaki and Shinya Aoki won (Note: Order of entrance: Tetsuya Endo, Makoto Oishi, Yukio Naya, Antonio Honda, Yasu Urano, Daisuke Sasaki, Shinya Aoki, and Danshoku Dino. Order of retrievals: Yasu Urano (won the Right to Challenge at Saitama Super Arena Sword), Daisuke Sasaki, and Shinya Aoki (both won a Right to Challenge Anytime Anywhere contract).)	Right to Challenge Anytime Anywhere Battle Royal	12:26
5	Daisuke Sasaki defeated Yasu Urano	Singles match for the Right to Challenge at Saitama Super Arena Sword; This was Sasaki's Right to Challenge Anytime Anywhere cash-in match.	1:59
6	Naomichi Marufuji defeated Kazuki Hirata	Singles match	11:01
7	Nautilus (Yuki Ueno and Naomi Yoshimura) (c) defeated Chihiro Hashimoto and Yuki Iino	Tag team match for the KO-D Tag Team Championship	11:27
8	Masato Tanaka defeated Harashima (c)	Singles match for the KO-D Openweight Championship	20:18
(c) / – the champion(s) heading into the match

=== 2022 ===
Sweet Dreams! 2022
- Promotion: CyberFight
- Brand: DDT Pro-Wrestling
- Date: January 30, 2022
- City: Tokyo, Japan
- Venue: Korakuen Hall
- Attendance: 516

Event chronology
← Previous; Never Mind 2021 in Yoyogi	Next → Ultimate Tag League 2022

Sweet Dreams! chronology
← Previous; 2020	Next → 2023

No.	Results	Stipulations	Times
1^{P}	Antonio Honda and Yusuke Okada defeated Toru Owashi, Tomomitsu Matsunaga and Yuki Ishida	Three-on-two handicap match	6:46
2	Eruption (Kazusada Higuchi, Yukio Sakaguchi, Saki Akai and Hideki Okatani) defeated Akito, Soma Takao, Toui Kojima and Yuya Koroku	Eight-person tag team match	10:32
3	Pheromones (Yuki "Sexy" Iino and Yumehito "Fantastic" Imanari) defeated The37Kamiina (Shunma Katsumata and Mao)	B Block tag team match in the Ultimate Tag League	9:35
4	The37Kamiina (Konosuke Takeshita and Yuki Ueno) defeated Shuji Kondo and Kazuki Hirata	A Block tag team match in the Ultimate Tag League	14:10
5	Burning (Tetsuya Endo and Jun Akiyama) defeated Yuji Hino and Yukio Naya	A Block tag team match in the Ultimate Tag League	14:40
6	Calamari Drunken Kings (Chris Brookes and Masahiro Takanashi) defeated Disaster Box (Harashima and Naomi Yoshimura)	B Block tag team match in the Ultimate Tag League	19:13
7	Daisuke Sasaki (c) defeated Minoru Fujita	Singles match for the DDT Universal Championship	19:27
(c) / – the champion(s) heading into the match; P / – the match was broadcast on the pre-show

=== 2023 ===
The 2023 edition of Sweet Dreams! was held on January 29 at the Korakuen Hall. In the main event, Yuji Hino defeated Kazusada Higuchi to win the KO-D Openweight Championship.

=== 2024 ===
The 2024 edition of Sweet Dreams! was held on January 28 at the Korakuen Hall. In the main event, Yuki Ueno defeated Yukio Naya to retain the KO-D Openweight Championship.
