= D-Oh Grand Prix =

DDT Pro-Wrestling event series

- D-Oh Grand Prix trophy
- Promotions: DDT (2018–2020); CyberFight (2021–2023)
- Brands: DDT (2021–2023)
- First event: D-Oh Grand Prix 2018
- Last event: D-Oh Grand Prix 2023
- Event gimmick: Round-robin tournament for a championship match

The D-Oh Grand Prix (Japanese: D王 GRAND PRIX, Hepburn: Dī Ō Guran Puri) is an annual professional wrestling tournament that was held for seven editions from 2018 to 2023. DDT Pro-Wrestling (DDT) first hosted it from 2018 to 2020, and CyberFight hosted it as a DDT-branded event from 2021 to 2023. Unlike the annual King of DDT Tournament, which is a single-elimination tournament, the D-Oh Grand Prix was round-robin. Like the King of DDT, however, the winner of the D-Oh Grand Prix received a shot at the KO-D Openweight Championship.

== History ==
The tournament was created by DDT producer Danshoku Dino in August 2017 and later confirmed in November.

After the first edition was held in January 2018, the second edition had to be held in December 2018 while retaining the name "D-Oh Grand Prix 2019". This offset between the tournament title and the year it was actually held persisted until 2021 where the tournament (held between November and December 2021) was entitled "D-Oh Grand Prix 2021 II".

Shuji Ishikawa is the inaugural winner of the tournament; Konosuke Takeshita is the only two-time winner.

=== Rules ===
- The matches were fought to one fall with a 30 minutes time limit. The final had no time limit.
- The participants were divided into two blocks, A and B, and fought in a round-robin using a points system; two points for a victory, one point for a draw, and zero points for a loss.
- The winners from the two blocks went on to fight in the final to decide the D-Oh Grand Prix winner.
- The D-Oh Grand Prix winner, assuming they did not already hold the KO-D Openweight Championship, obtained first contendership to the title and received a title shot.

== Tournaments ==
Edition	Tournament			Aftermath	
Edition	Winner	Won	Participants	KO-D Openweight Championship match	Result
2018	Shuji Ishikawa	1	14	vs. Konosuke Takeshita on March 25, 2018, at Judgement 2018: DDT 21st Anniversary	Lost
2019	Konosuke Takeshita	1	14	vs. Daisuke Sasaki on February 17, 2019, at Judgement 2019: DDT 22nd Anniversary	Won
2020	Masato Tanaka	1	14	vs. Harashima on January 26, 2020, at Sweet Dreams! 2020	Won
2021	Jun Akiyama	1	14	vs. Tetsuya Endo on February 14, 2021, at Kawasaki Strong 2021	Won
2021 II	Konosuke Takeshita	2	12	vs. Yuji Okabayashi (Note: Because Konosuke Takeshita won the tournament while already being the champion, he was allowed to choose his challenger.) on December 26, 2021, at Never Mind 2021	Won
2022	Yuki Ueno	1	12	vs. Kazusada Higuchi on December 29, 2022, at Never Mind 2022	Lost
2023	Yukio Naya	1	12	vs. Yuki Ueno on January 28, 2024, at Sweet Dreams! 2024	Lost

== Results ==
=== 2018 ===
The 2018 edition of the D-Oh Grand Prix was announced on August 20, 2017, and the participants were later announced on November 23. The tournament ran over eight shows from January 5 to January 28, 2018. It included Jiro "Ikemen" Kuroshio from the Wrestle-1 promotion.

Final standings
Block A		Block B	
Harashima	8	Shuji Ishikawa	10
Konosuke Takeshita	7	Daisuke Sasaki	6
Tetsuya Endo	7	Kazusada Higuchi	6
Joey Ryan	6	Soma Takao	6
Jiro "Ikemen" Kuroshio	6	Mike Bailey	6
Keisuke Ishii	6	Akito	4
Masahiro Takanashi	2	Yukio Sakaguchi	4

Block A	Takeshita	Harashima	Endo	Ishii	Takanashi	Ryan	Kuroshio
Takeshita	—N/a	Takeshita (15:50)	Draw (30:00)	Takeshita (18:47)	Takanashi (11:17)	Takeshita (13:10)	Kuroshio (23:23)
Harashima	Takeshita (15:50)	—N/a	Harashima (19:28)	Ishii (12:45)	Harashima (11:41)	Harashima (10:49)	Harashima (13:56)
Endo	Draw (30:00)	Harashima (19:28)	—N/a	Ishii (17:39)	Endo (6:01)	Endo (8:24)	Endo (14:04)
Ishii	Takeshita (18:47)	Ishii (12:45)	Ishii (17:39)	—N/a	Ishii (6:17)	Ryan (8:06)	Kuroshio (11:51)
Takanashi	Takanashi (11:17)	Harashima (11:41)	Endo (6:01)	Ishii (6:17)	—N/a	Ryan (10:10)	Kuroshio (12:56)
Ryan	Takeshita (13:10)	Harashima (10:49)	Endo (8:24)	Ryan (8:06)	Ryan (10:10)	—N/a	Ryan (10:46)
Kuroshio	Kuroshio (23:23)	Harashima (13:56)	Endo (14:04)	Kuroshio (11:51)	Kuroshio (12:56)	Ryan (10:46)	—N/a
Block B	Sasaki	Sakaguchi	Takao	Akito	Higuchi	Bailey	Ishikawa
Sasaki	—N/a	Sakaguchi (6:56)	Sasaki (11:02)	Akito (12:03)	Sasaki (11:58)	Bailey (14:54)	Sasaki (16:19)
Sakaguchi	Sakaguchi (6:56)	—N/a	Takao (7:56)	Akito (9:35)	Sakaguchi (7:48)	Bailey (9:56)	Ishikawa (15:25)
Takao	Sasaki (11:02)	Takao (7:56)	—N/a	Takao (8:18)	Higuchi (10:11)	Takao (10:50)	Ishikawa (11:53)
Akito	Akito (12:03)	Akito (9:35)	Takao (8:18)	—N/a	Higuchi (9:30)	Bailey (11:35)	Ishikawa (18:32)
Higuchi	Sasaki (11:58)	Sakaguchi (7:48)	Higuchi (10:11)	Higuchi (9:30)	—N/a	Higuchi (14:11)	Ishikawa (16:40)
Bailey	Bailey (14:54)	Bailey (9:56)	Takao (10:50)	Bailey (11:35)	Higuchi (14:11)	—N/a	Ishikawa (15:15)
Ishikawa	Sasaki (16:19)	Ishikawa (15:25)	Ishikawa (11:53)	Ishikawa (18:32)	Ishikawa (16:40)	Ishikawa (15:15)	—N/a

Final
A1	Harashima	19:12
B1	Shuji Ishikawa	Pin

=== 2019 ===
The 2019 edition was announced on October 21, 2018, and the participants were later announced on the same day. The tournament ran over nine shows from November 30 until December 30, 2018. The tournament included Go Shiozaki from Pro Wrestling Noah who made his first appearance in a D-Oh Grand Prix as did Shinya Aoki, Sammy Guevara, Mao and Puma King. Because Konosuke Takeshita entered the tournament as the reigning Ironman Heavymetalweight Champion, multiple matches in block B and the finals of the tournament were contested for the title due to its 24/7 rule.

Final standings
Block A		Block B	
Go Shiozaki	10	Konosuke Takeshita	8
Kazusada Higuchi	6	Shinya Aoki	8
Harashima	6	Tetsuya Endo	6
Akito	6	Mike Bailey	6
Daisuke Sasaki	6	Sammy Guevara	6
Mao	4	Masahiro Takanashi	4
Puma King	4	Soma Takao	4

Block A	Sasaki	Harashima	Higuchi	Akito	Mao	Puma	Shiozaki
Sasaki	—N/a	Harashima (15:47)	Sasaki (16:41)	Akito (13:05)	Sasaki (14:26)	Puma (13:34)	Sasaki (18:22)
Harashima	Harashima (15:47)	—N/a	Higuchi (17:13)	Harashima (11:59)	Mao (16:20)	Harashima (9:37)	Shiozaki (22:50)
Higuchi	Sasaki (16:41)	Higuchi (17:13)	—N/a	Akito (10:54)	Higuchi (13:46)	Higuchi (7:53)	Shiozaki (16:05)
Akito	Akito (13:05)	Harashima (11:59)	Akito (10:54)	—N/a	Akito (8:43)	Puma (10:28)	Shiozaki (13:03)
Mao	Sasaki (14:26)	Mao (16:20)	Higuchi (13:46)	Akito (8:43)	—N/a	Mao (10:43)	Shiozaki (15:04)
Puma	Puma (13:34)	Harashima (9:37)	Higuchi (7:53)	Puma (10:28)	Mao (10:43)	—N/a	Shiozaki (11:13)
Shiozaki	Sasaki (18:22)	Shiozaki (22:50)	Shiozaki (16:05)	Shiozaki (13:03)	Shiozaki (15:04)	Shiozaki (11:13)	—N/a
Block B	Takeshita	Endo	Takao	Takanashi	Bailey	Guevara	Aoki
Takeshita	—N/a	Endo (22:11)	Takeshita (Note: This match was also for Takeshita's Ironman Heavymetalweight Championship.) (14:21)	Takeshita (13:53)	Bailey (16:56)	Takeshita (11:37)	Takeshita (Note: This match was also for Aoki's Ironman Heavymetalweight Championship.) (8:53)
Endo	Endo (22:11)	—N/a	Takao (Note: This match was also for Endo's Ironman Heavymetalweight Championship.) (13:28)	Endo (12:05)	Endo (Note: This match was also for Bailey's Ironman Heavymetalweight Championship.) (14:30)	Guevara (11:59)	Aoki (8:13)
Takao	Takeshita (14:21)	Takao (13:28)	—N/a	Takanashi (8:33)	Takao (12:39)	Guevara (10:14)	Aoki (Note: This match was also for Takao's Ironman Heavymetalweight Championship.) (5:34)
Takanashi	Takeshita (13:53)	Endo (12:05)	Takanashi (8:33)	—N/a	Bailey (10:40)	Guevara (9:45)	Takanashi (1:01)
Bailey	Bailey (16:56)	Endo (14:30)	Takao (12:39)	Bailey (10:40)	—N/a	Bailey (19:57)	Aoki (4:28)
Guevara	Takeshita (11:37)	Guevara (11:59)	Guevara (10:14)	Guevara (9:45)	Bailey (19:57)	—N/a	Aoki (3:52)
Aoki	Takeshita (8:53)	Aoki (8:13)	Aoki (5:34)	Takanashi (1:01)	Aoki (4:28)	Aoki (3:52)	—N/a

Final
A1	Go Shiozaki	23:07
B1	Konosuke Takeshita	Pin

=== 2020 ===
The 2020 tournament was announced on September 29, 2019, and the participants were later announced on the same day. The tournament was held from November 29 until December 28, 2019. This year's edition included Chihiro Hashimoto from the Sendai Girls' Pro Wrestling promotion. Chris Brookes, Yuki Iino, Bull James, Masato Tanaka, Yuki Ueno and Naomi Yoshimura made their first appearance in the tournament.

Final standings
Block A		Block B	
Tetsuya Endo	7	Masato Tanaka	11
Chris Brookes	7	Harashima	9
Keisuke Ishii	6	Daisuke Sasaki	8
Konosuke Takeshita	6	Soma Takao	4
Chihiro Hashimoto	6	Yukio Sakaguchi	4
Yuki Iino	6	Bull James	4
Yuki Ueno	4	Naomi Yoshimura	2

Block A	Takeshita	Endo	Ishii	Ueno	Iino	Brookes	Hashimoto
Takeshita	—N/a	Endo (23:49)	Ishii (15:05)	Takeshita (22:39)	Takeshita (16:35)	Brookes (19:25)	Takeshita (20:16)
Endo	Endo (23:49)	—N/a	Endo (14:21)	Ueno (15:15)	Iino (12:18)	Draw (30:00)	Endo (14:31)
Ishii	Ishii (15:05)	Endo (14:21)	—N/a	Ueno (9:27)	Ishii (7:24)	Brookes (13:51)	Ishii (10:58)
Ueno	Takeshita (22:39)	Ueno (15:15)	Ueno (9:27)	—N/a	Iino (10:47)	Brookes (10:17)	Hashimoto (13:32)
Iino	Takeshita (16:35)	Iino (12:18)	Ishii (7:24)	Iino (10:47)	—N/a	Iino (11:32)	Hashimoto (11:53)
Brookes	Brookes (19:25)	Draw (30:00)	Brookes (13:51)	Brookes (10:17)	Iino (11:32)	—N/a	Hashimoto (12:28)
Hashimoto	Takeshita (20:16)	Endo (14:31)	Ishii (10:58)	Hashimoto (13:32)	Hashimoto (11:53)	Hashimoto (12:28)	—N/a
Block B	Harashima	Sasaki	Takao	Sakaguchi	Yoshimura	James	Tanaka
Harashima	—N/a	Sasaki (12:32)	Harashima (10:33)	Harashima (15:13)	Harashima (14:29)	Harashima (13:26)	Draw (30:00)
Sasaki	Sasaki (12:32)	—N/a	Sasaki (13:35)	Sasaki (2:24)	Yoshimura (16:12)	Sasaki (8:50)	Tanaka (19:56)
Takao	Harashima (10:33)	Sasaki (13:35)	—N/a	Sakaguchi (8:16)	Takao (9:08)	Takao (7:40)	Tanaka (15:10)
Sakaguchi	Harashima (15:13)	Sasaki (2:24)	Sakaguchi (8:16)	—N/a	Sakaguchi (3:26)	James (7:37)	Tanaka (10:22)
Yoshimura	Harashima (14:29)	Yoshimura (16:12)	Takao (9:08)	Sakaguchi (3:26)	—N/a	James (8:48)	Tanaka (13:46)
James	Harashima (13:26)	Sasaki (8:50)	Takao (7:40)	James (7:37)	James (8:48)	—N/a	Tanaka (7:46)
Tanaka	Draw (30:00)	Tanaka (19:56)	Tanaka (15:10)	Tanaka (10:22)	Tanaka (13:46)	Tanaka (7:46)	—N/a

Block A play-off			Final
A1	Tetsuya Endo	Sub
A2	Chris Brookes	12:17	A1	Tetsuya Endo	23:57
			B1	Masato Tanaka	Pin

=== 2021 ===
The 2021 tournament was announced on September 7, 2020, at Get Alive 2020 and the participants were later announced on November 3, at Ultimate Party 2020. The tournament was held from November 22 until December 27, 2020. Making their D-Oh Grand Prix debut were Shunma Katsumata, Makoto Oishi and Jun Akiyama. Daisuke Sasaki was diagnosed with a fractured rib after his first match and had to withdraw from the rest of the tournament.

Final standings
Block A		Block B	
Konosuke Takeshita	8	Jun Akiyama	8
Harashima	7	Tetsuya Endo	7
Akito	7	Kazusada Higuchi	7
Mao	6	Soma Takao	6
Yukio Sakaguchi	6	Yuki Ueno	6
Chris Brookes	6	Makoto Oishi	4
Daisuke Sasaki	2	Shunma Katsumata	4

Block A	Takeshita	Harashima	Sasaki	Sakaguchi	Akito	Mao	Brookes
Takeshita	—N/a	Takeshita (20:39)	Sasaki (13:45)	Takeshita (11:26)	Takeshita (29:32)	Takeshita (22:46)	Brookes (24:41)
Harashima	Takeshita (20:39)	—N/a	Harashima (Forfeit)	Sakaguchi (10:17)	Draw (16:26)	Harashima (12:49)	Harashima (11:13)
Sasaki	Sasaki (13:45)	Harashima (Forfeit)	—N/a	Sakaguchi (Forfeit)	Akito (Forfeit)	Mao (Forfeit)	Brookes (Forfeit)
Sakaguchi	Takeshita (11:26)	Sakaguchi (10:17)	Sakaguchi (Forfeit)	—N/a	Akito (8:56)	Mao (9:53)	Sakaguchi (10:45)
Akito	Takeshita (29:32)	Draw (16:26)	Akito (Forfeit)	Akito (8:56)	—N/a	Akito (7:08)	Brookes (13:10)
Mao	Takeshita (22:46)	Harashima (12:49)	Mao (Forfeit)	Mao (9:53)	Akito (7:08)	—N/a	Mao (14:28)
Brookes	Brookes (24:41)	Harashima (11:13)	Brookes (Forfeit)	Sakaguchi (10:45)	Brookes (13:10)	Mao (14:28)	—N/a
Block B	Endo	Higuchi	Takao	Oishi	Ueno	Katsumata	Akiyama
Endo	—N/a	Draw (20:56)	Takao (16:37)	Oishi (19:26)	Endo (22:56)	Endo (11:45)	Endo (14:00)
Higuchi	Draw (20:56)	—N/a	Higuchi (11:30)	Higuchi (9:07)	Ueno (11:49)	Katsumata (10:59)	Higuchi (4:03)
Takao	Takao (16:37)	Higuchi (11:30)	—N/a	Takao (2:30)	Takao (12:01)	Katsumata (10:05)	Akiyama (8:22)
Oishi	Oishi (19:26)	Higuchi (9:07)	Takao (2:30)	—N/a	Ueno (17:23)	Oishi (7:39)	Akiyama (10:49)
Ueno	Endo (22:56)	Ueno (11:49)	Takao (12:01)	Ueno (17:23)	—N/a	Ueno (13:56)	Akiyama (11:51)
Katsumata	Endo (11:45)	Katsumata (10:59)	Katsumata (10:05)	Oishi (7:39)	Ueno (13:56)	—N/a	Akiyama (9:53)
Akiyama	Endo (14:00)	Higuchi (4:03)	Akiyama (8:22)	Akiyama (10:49)	Akiyama (11:51)	Akiyama (9:53)	—N/a

Final
A1	Konosuke Takeshita	23:29
B1	Jun Akiyama	TKO

=== 2021 II ===
On July 4, 2021, DDT announced the next tournament would be named "D-Oh Grand Prix 2021 II", thus ending the trend of the name not matching the year. This edition ran from November 3 to December 5 and featured only 12 participants. Konosuke Takeshita became the first wrestler to win the D-Oh Grand Prix while holding the KO-D Openweight Championship and the first to win two editions. Kenta Kobashi was the special observer for the tournament.

Final standings
Block A		Block B	
Yuki Ueno	6	Konosuke Takeshita	9
Tetsuya Endo	6	Yuji Okabayashi	8
Yuji Hino	6	Kazusada Higuchi	4
Jun Akiyama	6	Chris Brookes	4
Bodyguard	4	Mao	4
Naomi Yoshimura	2	Harashima	1

Block A	Akiyama	Endo	Ueno	Yoshimura	Hino	Bodyguard
Akiyama	—N/a	Akiyama (18:28)	Ueno (9:42)	Akiyama (15:17)	Hino (19:44)	Akiyama (10:39)
Endo	Akiyama (18:28)	—N/a	Ueno (21:21)	Endo (8:20)	Endo (16:34)	Endo (12:11)
Ueno	Ueno (9:42)	Ueno (21:21)	—N/a	Yoshimura (13:51)	Ueno (16:25)	Bodyguard (10:45)
Yoshimura	Akiyama (15:17)	Endo (8:20)	Yoshimura (13:51)	—N/a	Hino (10:13)	Bodyguard (9:06)
Hino	Hino (19:44)	Endo (16:34)	Ueno (16:25)	Hino (10:13)	—N/a	Hino (15:06)
Bodyguard	Akiyama (10:39)	Endo (12:11)	Bodyguard (10:45)	Bodyguard (9:06)	Hino (15:06)	—N/a
Block B	Takeshita	Harashima	Higuchi	Brookes	Mao	Okabayashi
Takeshita	—N/a	Takeshita (16:19)	Takeshita (5:09)	Takeshita (18:46)	Takeshita (15:07)	Draw (30:00)
Harashima	Takeshita (16:19)	—N/a	Higuchi (16:24)	Brookes (15:06)	Mao (12:56)	Draw (30:00)
Higuchi	Takeshita (5:09)	Higuchi (16:24)	—N/a	Higuchi (14:49)	Mao (11:12)	Okabayashi (23:39)
Brookes	Takeshita (18:46)	Brookes (15:06)	Higuchi (14:49)	—N/a	Brookes (16:51)	Okabayashi (13:16)
Mao	Takeshita (15:07)	Mao (12:56)	Mao (11:12)	Brookes (16:51)	—N/a	Okabayashi (13:58)
Okabayashi	Draw (30:00)	Draw (30:00)	Okabayashi (23:39)	Okabayashi (13:16)	Okabayashi (13:58)	—N/a

Final
A1	Yuki Ueno	27:10
B1	Konosuke Takeshita	Sub

=== 2022 ===
On August 20, 2022, DDT announced the 2022 edition would have 12 participants. This tournament ran from November 1 to December 4. Like previous year, Kenta Kobashi was the special observer of the tournament.

Final standings
Block A		Block B	
Yuki Ueno	6	Yukio Naya	8
Daisuke Sasaki	5	Kazusada Higuchi	7
Tetsuya Endo	5	Yuji Hino	7
Rickey Shane Page	5	Chris Brookes	4
Joey Janela	5	Kanon	2
Naomi Yoshimura	4	Mao	2

Block A	Endo	Sasaki	Ueno	Yoshimura	Janela	Page
Endo	—N/a	Draw (30:00)	Endo (15:41)	Yoshimura (7:05)	Janela (13:47)	Endo (10:26)
Sasaki	Draw (30:00)	—N/a	Ueno (16:53)	Sasaki (9:10)	Sasaki (11:38)	Page (11:00)
Ueno	Endo (15:41)	Ueno (16:53)	—N/a	Yoshimura (22:57)	Ueno (10:01)	Ueno (12:29)
Yoshimura	Yoshimura (7:05)	Sasaki (9:10)	Yoshimura (22:57)	—N/a	Janela (11:29)	Page (8:14)
Janela	Janela (13:47)	Sasaki (11:38)	Ueno (10:01)	Janela (11:29)	—N/a	Draw (11:36)
Page	Endo (10:26)	Page (11:00)	Ueno (12:29)	Page (8:14)	Draw (11:36)	—N/a
Block B	Higuchi	Brookes	Mao	Hino	Naya	Kanon
Higuchi	—N/a	Higuchi (14:12)	Higuchi (11:41)	Draw (30:00)	Naya (19:05)	Higuchi (18:33)
Brookes	Higuchi (14:12)	—N/a	Mao (11:53)	Brookes (12:10)	Naya (5:24)	Brookes (11:30)
Mao	Higuchi (11:41)	Mao (11:53)	—N/a	Hino (10:15)	Naya (11:49)	Kanon (17:37)
Hino	Draw (30:00)	Brookes (12:10)	Hino (10:15)	—N/a	Hino (13:04)	Hino (8:16)
Naya	Naya (19:05)	Naya (5:24)	Naya (11:49)	Hino (13:04)	—N/a	Naya (8:21)
Kanon	Higuchi (18:33)	Brookes (11:30)	Kanon (17:37)	Hino (8:16)	Naya (8:21)	—N/a

Final
A1	Yuki Ueno	Pin
B1	Yukio Naya	20:32

=== 2023 ===
On September 13, 2023, DDT announced the 2023 edition would feature 12 participants. The tournament ran from November 26, 2023 to January 3, 2024. Chris Brookes had to forfeit his last match of the tournament after it was discovered that he had a non-malignant tumor in his abdomen.

Final standings
Block A		Block B	
Tetsuya Endo	6	Yukio Naya	8
Kazusada Higuchi	6	Rei Saito	8
Yuki Ueno	5	Mao	6
Daisuke Sasaki	5	Kanon	4
Yuki Iino	4	Kazuki Hirata	2
Harashima	4	Chris Brookes	2

Block A	Ueno	Endo	Higuchi	Sasaki	Harashima	Iino
Ueno	—N/a	Endo (21:18)	Ueno (17:46)	Draw (30:00)	Ueno (14:21)	Iino (8:14)
Endo	Endo (21:18)	—N/a	Endo (20:37)	Sasaki (22:53)	Harashima (17:13)	Endo (13:36)
Higuchi	Ueno (17:46)	Endo (20:37)	—N/a	Higuchi (13:55)	Higuchi (13:14)	Higuchi (12:03)
Sasaki	Draw (30:00)	Sasaki (22:53)	Higuchi (13:55)	—N/a	Harashima (6:37)	Sasaki (9:15)
Harashima	Ueno (14:21)	Harashima (17:13)	Higuchi (13:14)	Harashima (6:37)	—N/a	Iino (5:31)
Iino	Iino (8:14)	Endo (13:36)	Higuchi (12:03)	Sasaki (9:15)	Iino (5:31)	—N/a
Block B	Brookes	Mao	Naya	Kanon	Hirata	Saito
Brookes	—N/a	Mao (Note: This match was also for Mao's DDT Universal Championship.) (21:34)	Naya (16:10)	Brookes (9:27)	Hirata (9:46)	Saito (Forfeit)
Mao	Mao (21:34)	—N/a	Naya (10:58)	Mao (13:17)	Mao (10:06)	Saito (10:22)
Naya	Naya (16:10)	Naya (10:58)	—N/a	Kanon (13:47)	Naya (11:39)	Naya (15:10)
Kanon	Brookes (9:27)	Mao (13:17)	Kanon (13:47)	—N/a	Kanon (8:27)	Saito (11:43)
Hirata	Hirata (9:46)	Mao (10:06)	Naya (11:39)	Kanon (8:27)	—N/a	Saito (12:49)
Saito	Saito (Forfeit)	Saito (10:22)	Naya (15:10)	Saito (11:43)	Saito (12:49)	—N/a

Final
A1	Tetsuya Endo	26:59
B1	Yukio Naya	Pin

== See also ==
- G1 Climax
- Champion Carnival
- N-1 Victory
- Fire Festival
- Ikkitousen Strong Climb
- King of Gate
