= Sweet Dreams! 2023 =

2023 DDT Pro-Wrestling event

- Promotional poster featuring Kazusada Higuchi and Yuji Hino
- Promotion: CyberFight
- Brand: DDT
- Date: January 29, 2023
- City: Tokyo, Japan
- Venue: Korakuen Hall
- Attendance: 777
- Tagline: 30-Minute Draw; 182 Strikes; Beyond That, A Fully Decisive Battle (Note: Japanese: 30分ドロー 182発 その先の完全決着戦, Hepburn: Sanjuppun Dorō; Hyakuhachijūni-hatsu; Sono Saki no Kanzen Ketchakusen)

Event chronology
← Previous; Never Mind 2022	Next → Into The Fight 2023

Sweet Dreams! chronology
← Previous; 2022	Next → 2024

Sweet Dreams! 2023 was a professional wrestling event promoted by CyberFight's sub-brand DDT Pro-Wrestling (DDT). It took place on January 29, 2023, in Tokyo, Japan, at the Korakuen Hall. The event aired on CyberAgent's AbemaTV online linear television service and CyberFight's streaming service Wrestle Universe.

Nine matches were contested at the event, including two on the pre-show, and three of DDT's nine championships were on the line. The main event saw Yuji Hino defeat Kazusada Higuchi to win the KO-D Openweight Championship for the second time. In other prominent matches, ShunMao (Mao and Shunma Katsumata) successfully defended the KO-D Tag Team Championship against Omega (Makoto Oishi and Shiori Asahi), and Burning (Tetsuya Endo, Kotaro Suzuki and Yusuke Okada) defeated Pheromones (Yuki "Sexy" Iino, Danshoku "Dandy" Dino and Koju "Shiningball" Takeda) to retain the KO-D 6-Man Tag Team Championship.

== Production ==
=== Background ===
The event featured nine professional wrestling matches that resulted from scripted storylines, where wrestlers portrayed villains, heroes, or less distinguishable characters in the scripted events that built tension and culminated in a wrestling match or series of matches.

== Event ==
The preshow portraited a comedic No fee rumble match featuring cosplayers of various popular wrestlers from other consecrated promotions such as Drew McIntyre, Luke Gallows, Great-O-Khan, Asuka or Tiger Mask. It was won by Fuminori Abe who last eliminated Sanshiro Takagi. The first match of the main card saw Kanon and MJ Paul picking up a victory over the teams of Disasterbox (Kazuki Hirata and Toru Owashi), Akito and Antonio Honda, and Yuki Ishida and Yuya Koroku in four-way tag team action. Next, Hideki Okatani defeated Kazuma Sumi and Keigo Nakamura defeated Takeshi Masada in the first ever edition of the D Generations Cup, the successor of the former and folded Young Drama Cup. Next, The37Kamiina (Toui Kojima and Yuki Ueno) and Shinya Aoki defeated Hikaru Machida, Thanomsak Toba and Yukio Sakaguchi in six-man tag team action. Another six-action saw Chris Brookes, Harashima and Yukio Naya defeating Jun Akiyama, DDT Universal Champion Naruki Doi and Soma Takao. On the seventh bout of the event, Tetsuya Endo, Kotaro Suzuki and Yusuke Okada marked their first successful defense of the KO-D 6-Man Tag Team Championship against Pheromones (Danshoku Dino, Koju Takeda and Yuki Iino). In the semi main event, Mao and Shunma Katsumata secured their first defense of the KO-D Tag Team Championship against Makoto Oishi and Shiori Asahi.

In the main event, Yuji Hino defeated Kazusada Higuchi to win the KO-D Openweight Championship for the second time in his career, ending the latter's reign at 210 days.

== Results ==
No.	Results	Stipulations	Times
1^{P}	Fuminori Abe won by last eliminating Sanshiro Takagi (Note: The other participants were Ariji Akinori, Ashuka, Big Bear, BRA-VO, Crusher Inoba, Dick Zlater, Dopyu McIntyre, Fat Kobashi, Fuck Takeda, Great-CO-Khan, Great-GO-Khan, Gundan Hitori, Hen China, Honagi Takemoto, Kaijin Mukuro 696, Kim Yocchan, Macho Gallows, Mazakon Kid, Mori Haruomi, Self-Proclaimed Tiger Mask V, Shinya, Shosaku Inoue, Tadaki Toronomi, Takuma Joshiba, Tezuka Awesome Ichiro, Thick And Hard Kankuro Hoshino and Tsutenkakuka.)	No fee rumble match	12:49
2^{P}	Damnation T.A (Kanon and MJ Paul) defeated Disaster Box (Kazuki Hirata and Toru Owashi), Akito and Antonio Honda, and Yuki Ishida and Yuya Koroku by pinfall	Four-way tag team match	7:11
3	Hideki Okatani defeated Kazuma Sumi by pinfall	D Generations Cup A Block match	5:22
4	Keigo Nakamura defeated Takeshi Masada by pinfall	D Generations Cup B Block match	7:10
5	The37Kamiina (Toui Kojima and Yuki Ueno) and Shinya Aoki defeated Hikaru Machida, Thanomsak Toba and Yukio Sakaguchi by pinfall	Six-man tag team match	8:20
6	Chris Brookes, Harashima and Yukio Naya defeated Jun Akiyama, Naruki Doi and Soma Takao by pinfall	Six-man tag team match	10:02
7	Burning (Tetsuya Endo, Kotaro Suzuki and Yusuke Okada) (c) defeated Pheromones (Yuki "Sexy" Iino, Danshoku "Dandy" Dino and Koju "Shiningball" Takeda) by pinfall	Six-man tag team match for the KO-D 6-Man Tag Team Championship	12:08
8	ShunMao (Mao and Shunma Katsumata) (c) defeated Omega (Makoto Oishi and Shiori Asahi) by pinfall	Tag team match for the KO-D Tag Team Championship	14:59
9	Yuji Hino defeated Kazusada Higuchi (c) by pinfall	Singles match for the KO-D Openweight Championship	26:27
(c) / – the champion(s) heading into the match; P / – the match was broadcast on the pre-show
