= Judgement 2013 =

2013 DDT Pro-Wrestling event

- Promotion: DDT Pro-Wrestling
- Date: March 20, 2013
- City: Tokyo, Japan
- Venue: Korakuen Hall
- Attendance: 1,435

Judgement chronology
← Previous; 2012	Next → 2014

Judgement 2013 was a professional wrestling event promoted by DDT Pro-Wrestling (DDT). It took place on March 20, 2013, in Tokyo, Japan, at the Korakuen Hall. It was the seventeenth event under the Judgement name. The event aired domestically on Fighting TV Samurai.

== Storylines ==
Judgement 2013 featured seven professional wrestling matches that involved different wrestlers from pre-existing scripted feuds and storylines. Wrestlers portrayed villains, heroes, or less distinguishable characters in the scripted events that built tension and culminated in a wrestling match or series of matches.

== Event ==
The first match of the main card was Kazuki Hirata's return match.

The fourth match featured the veteran Tatsumi Fujinami in a quick bout against Konosuke Takeshita.

Next was a match that saw the professional wrestling debut of Kizaemon Saiga, a Japanese kickboxer and mixed martial artist.

Next was the Right To Challenge Anytime, Anywhere Contract Battle Royal for a KO-D Openweight Championship match at April Fool 2013, on April 13. Four envelopes were suspended above the ring, each containing a "Right To Challenge Anytime, Anywhere" contract, giving the right to their holder to challenge any champion at any time in the following year. Grabbing a contract resulted in being eliminated from the match.

== Results ==
No.	Results	Stipulations	Times
1^{D}	Gorgeous Matsuno and Daichi Kazato defeated Gota Ihashi and Tetsuya Endo	Tag team match	04:38
2	Kudo defeated Kazuki Hirata	Singles match	08:24
3	Monster Army (Yuji Hino, Antonio Honda and Daisuke Sasaki) (c) defeated Danshoku Dino, Makoto Oishi and Gabai-jichan	Six-man tag team match for the KO-D 6-Man Tag Team Championship	13:10
4	Tatsumi Fujinami defeated Konosuke Takeshita by submission	Singles match	05:38
5	Kota Ibushi and Kizaemon Saiga defeated Yasu Urano and Fuma	Tag team match	11:58
6	Yukio Sakaguchi won by last eliminating Masa Takanashi	Right To Challenge Anytime, Anywhere Contract Battle Royal	26:35
7	Shigehiro Irie defeated Kenny Omega (c)	Singles match for the KO-D Openweight Championship	24:26
(c) / – the champion(s) heading into the match; D / – this was a dark match

Right To Challenge Anytime, Anywhere Contract Battle Royal

Order	Name	Order eliminated	By	Time
1	Masa Takanashi	13	Yukio Sakaguchi	26:35
2	Sanshiro Takagi	3	Grabbing a contract	07:56
3	Soma Takao	2	Toru Owashi	06:59
4	Tomomitsu Matsunaga	1	Mikami	05:31
5	Keisuke Ishii	5	Grabbing a contract	12:01
6	DJ Nira	9	Grabbing a contract	19:34
7	Mikami	4	Masa Takanashi	10:56
8	Toru Owashi	10	Akito and Masa Takanashi	19:58
9	Harashima	6	Grabbing a contract	16:40
10	Yukio Sakaguchi	—	—	Winner
11	Michael Nakazawa	8	Toru Owashi	17:57
12	Hiroshi Fukuda	7	Toru Owashi	17:56
13	Hikaru Sato	12	Masa Takanashi	24:29
14	Akito	11	Hikaru Sato	22:16
