= Soma Takao =

Japanese professional wrestler

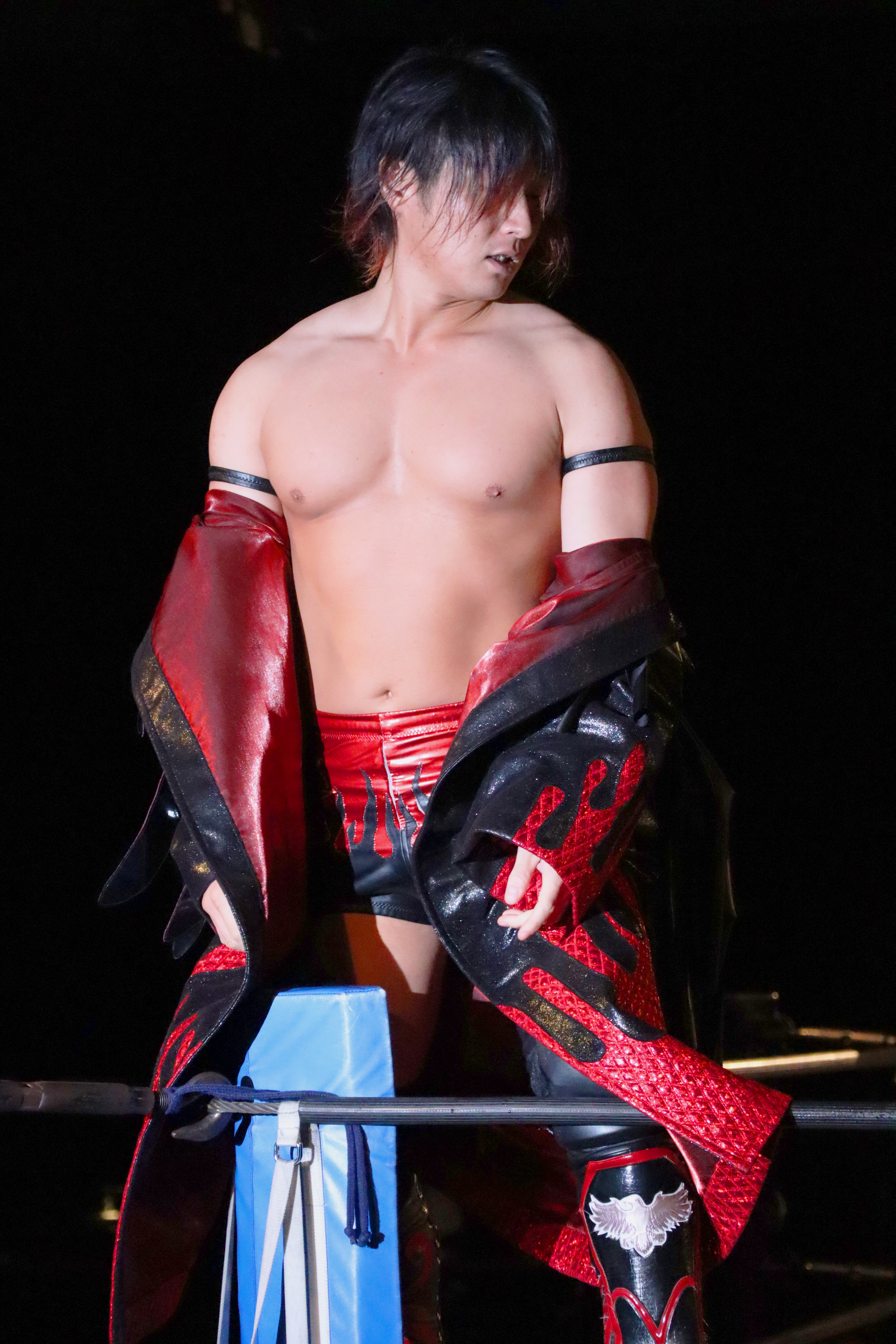
- Takao in 2020

Personal information
- Born: August 4, 1988 (age 38) Tokyo, Japan

Professional wrestling career
- Ring name(s): Bima; Soma Takao
- Billed height: 5 ft 8 in (173 cm)
- Billed weight: 172 lb (78 kg)
- Trained by: DDT Dojo; Wrestling University
- Debut: 2009

Soma Takao (高尾蒼馬, Takao Sōma) is a Japanese professional wrestler, working for the Japanese professional wrestling promotion DDT Pro-Wrestling (DDT). Takao has taken part in every edition of DDT's flagship annual event, Peter Pan, where he had a series of 13 straight victories.

== Professional wrestling career ==
=== Independent circuit (2009– present) ===
Takao made his professional wrestling debut for DDT Pro-Wrestling at Ryōgoku Peter Pan on August 23, 2009, where he teamed up with Keisuke Ishii and Yukihiro Abe to defeat Gota Ihashi, Shigehiro Irie, and Tomokazu Taniguchi in a six-man tag team match. He participated in one of the longest matches in professional wrestling history, a 108-man battle royal at Tenka Sanbun no Kei: New Year's Eve Special, a cross-over event held between Big Japan Pro Wrestling, DDT and Kaientai Dojo from December 31, 2009, competing against other infamous wrestlers such as Great Kojika, Taka Michinoku, Kenny Omega, Abdullah Kobayashi, and the winner of the match, Jun Kasai. He is known for his tenure with other promotions such as Ice Ribbon, where he worked his latest match on May 29, 2020 at Ice Ribbon Hiragi Kurumi 20th Birthday And Debut 10th Anniversary ~ Walnut Anniversary, where he teamed up with Hiragi Kurumi in a losing effort to Mochi Miyagi and Shigehiro Irie in an intergender tag team match. Takao won the AJPW World Junior Heavyweight Championship at Ryōgoku Peter Pan 2016, another cross-over event held by DDT and All Japan Pro Wrestling from August 28, 2016, where he defeated Hikaru Sato. On May 4, 2019, Takao worked a match for WWNLive, at WWNLive Mercury Rising, where he teamed up with fellow Damnation stable members Daisuke Sasaki and Tetsuya Endo to defeat The Skulk (Adrian Alanis, A. R. Fox and Leon Ruff). Takao worked for Dragon Gate as well, in another cross-over event also hosted by DDT, the Dragon Gate/DDT Dramatic Dream Gate Returns from June 5, 2012, where he teamed up with Sanshiro Takagi to defeat Kotoka and Masaaki Mochizuki.

=== DDT Pro-Wrestling (2009–2026) ===
Takao had his Luchas de apuestas match at DDT Into The Fight 2011 on February 27, where he defeated Hikaru Sato in a hair vs hair match. He was one of the inaugural KO-D 6-Man Tag Team Champions alongside Keisuke Ishii and Shigehiro Irie as part of the Team Dream Futures stable after defeating Team Shiro (Akito, Makoto Oishi and Sanshiro Takagi) in the finals of a four-team tournament which culminated at Osaka 24 Ward Tour: Nishi Ward on January 12, 2013. He is also a former KO-D Tag Team Champion, title which he won by teaming up with one of his stablemates from Damnation, Daisuke Sasaki at Into The Fight 2019, on March 21, after defeating Moonlight Express (Mike Bailey and Mao). The actual first time when he won the titles was at DDT Judgement 2012 on March 11, where he teamed up with former fellow New World Japan stable member Sanshiro Takagi to defeat Crying Wolf (Yuji Hino and Yasu Urano). Takao is a former multiple time Ironman Heavymetalweight Champion, lastly winning it in the first day of the D-Oh Grand Prix 2019 In Shin-Kiba, on December 7, 2018, where he defeated Tetsuya Endo in a match of the tournament's block B.

On 13 August 2026, it was announced that Takao would leave DDT at the end of the following month, with his final match taking September 27 of that year.

== Championships and accomplishments ==
- All Japan Pro Wrestling

- World Junior Heavyweight Championship (1 time)

- DDT Pro-Wrestling

- Ironman Heavymetalweight Championship (4 times)
- KO-D Tag Team Championship (3 times) – with Sanshiro Takagi (1), Daisuke Sasaki (1) and Shota (1)
- KO-D 6-Man Tag Team Championship (8 times) – with Keisuke Ishii and Shigehiro Irie (6), Tetsuya Endo and Mad Paulie (1), and Tetsuya Endo and Yuji Hino (1)
- World Ōmori Championship (1 time)
- Young Drama Cup (2010)

== Luchas de Apuestas record ==
| Winner (wager) | Loser (wager) | Location | Event | Date | Notes |
|---|---|---|---|---|---|
| Soma Takao (hair) | Hikaru Sato (hair) | Tokyo, Japan | Into The Fight 2011 | February 27, 2011 | |

== Peter Pan record ==
Peter Pan win–loss record of Soma Takao
| Result | Rec. | Opponent(s) | Date | Match time | Venue | Notes |
|---|---|---|---|---|---|---|
| Won | 1–0 | Shigehiro Irie, Tomokazu Taniguchi and Gota Ihashi | August 23, 2009; Ryōgoku Peter Pan | 12:24; Pinfall | Ryōgoku Kokugikan; Tokyo, Japan | This was a six-man tag team match. Takao teamed with Yukihiro Abe and Keisuke Ishii. This was Takao's debut match. |
| Won | 2–0 | Shigehiro Irie, Tatsuhiko Yoshino and Akito | July 25, 2010; Ryōgoku Peter Pan 2010 | 11:21; Pinfall | Ryōgoku Kokugikan; Tokyo, Japan | This was a six-man tag team match. Takao teamed with Daisuke Sasaki and Kazuki Hirata. |
| Won | 3–0 | Minoru Suzuki, Yoshiaki Yago, Kengo Ohka, Tomomitsu Matsunaga and Super Shit Machine | July 24, 2011; Ryōgoku Peter Pan 2011 | 24:20; Over the top rope | Ryōgoku Kokugikan; Tokyo, Japan | This was a 5-on-5 elimination match. Takao teamed with Sanshiro Takagi, Hikaru Sato, Kazuki Hirata and Akito. |
| Won | 4–0 | Keisuke Ishii and Shigehiro Irie, Hikaru Sato and Michael Nakazawa, Isami Kodaka and Hiroo Tsumaki, and Poison Sawada Julie and Rion Mizuki | August 18, 2012; Budokan Peter Pan | 21:24; Pinfall | Nippon Budokan; Tokyo, Japan | This was a tag team gauntlet match. Takao teamed with Yukio Sakaguchi. |
| Won | 5–0 | Yasu Urano and Kudo, Daisuke Sasaki and Yuji Hino, and Kenny Omega and Gota Ihashi | August 18, 2013; Ryōgoku Peter Pan 2013 | 13:31; Pinfall | Ryōgoku Kokugikan; Tokyo, Japan | This was a four-way tag team match for #1 contendership to the KO-D Tag Team Championship. Takao teamed with Keisuke Ishii. |
| Won | 6–0 | Kudo, Yukio Sakaguchi and Masa Takanashi | August 17, 2014; Ryōgoku Peter Pan 2014 | 10:57; Pinfall | Ryōgoku Kokugikan; Tokyo, Japan | This was a six-man tag team match. Takao teamed with Keisuke Ishii and Shigehiro Irie. Won the KO-D 6-Man Tag Team Championship. |
| Won | 7–0 | Danshoku Dino, Super Sasadango Machine and Ken Ohka | August 23, 2015; Ryōgoku Peter Pan 2015 | 12:35; Pinfall | Ryōgoku Kokugikan; Tokyo, Japan | This was a six-man tag team match. Takao teamed with Keisuke Ishii and Shigehiro Irie. Retained the KO-D 6-Man Tag Team Championship. |
| Won | 8–0 | Hikaru Sato | August 28, 2016; Ryōgoku Peter Pan 2016 | 17:07; Pinfall | Ryōgoku Kokugikan; Tokyo, Japan | Won the World Junior Heavyweight Championship. |
| Won | 9–0 | Kaz Hayashi and Keisuke Ishii, Mike Bailey and Mao, and Isami Kodaka and Yuko Miyamoto | August 20, 2017; Ryōgoku Peter Pan 2017 | 10:30; Pinfall | Ryōgoku Kokugikan; Tokyo, Japan | This was a four-way tag team match. Takao teamed with Kotaro Suzuki. |
| Won | 10–0 | Toru Owashi, Kazuki Hirata and Yuki Ueno | October 21, 2018; Ryōgoku Peter Pan 2018 | 11:21; Pinfall | Ryōgoku Kokugikan; Tokyo, Japan | This was a six-man tag team match. Takao teamed with Tetsuya Endo and Mad Paulie. Retained the KO-D 6-Man Tag Team Championship. |
| Won | 11–0 | Harashima and Yasu Urano | July 15, 2019; Wrestle Peter Pan 2019 | 24:21; Pinfall | Ota City General Gymnasium; Tokyo, Japan | This was a tag team match. Takao teamed with Daisuke Sasaki. Retained the KO-D Tag Team Championship. |
| Won | 12–0 | Keigo Nakamura and Hideki Okatani | June 6, 2020; Wrestle Peter Pan 2020 – Night 1 | 10:22; Pinfall | Shinjuku Face; Tokyo, Japan | This was a tag team match. Takao teamed with Mad Paulie. |
| Won | 13–0 | Kazusada Higuchi, Yukio Sakaguchi and Saki Akai | August 21, 2021; Wrestle Peter Pan 2021 | 11:34; Pinfall | Fujitsu Stadium Kawasaki; Kawasaki, Japan | This was a six-man tag team match. Takao teamed with Tetsuya Endo and Yuji Hino. Retained the KO-D 6-Man Tag Team Championship. |
| Lost | 13–1 | Osamu Nishimura, Makoto Oishi and Akito | August 20, 2022; Wrestle Peter Pan 2022 | 14:47; Submission | Ota City General Gymnasium; Tokyo, Japan | This was a six-man tag team match. Takao teamed with Shinichiro Kawamatsu and Sanshiro Takagi. |
| Lost | 13–2 | Yuki "Sexy" Iino, Danshoku "Dandy" Dino and Yumehito "Fantastic" Imanari | July 23, 2023; Wrestle Peter Pan 2023 | 9:42; Pinfall | Ryōgoku Kokugikan; Tokyo, Japan | This was a six-man tag team match. Takao teamed with Akito and Yoshitomo Shimohigashi. |
| Lost | 13–3 | Toru Owashi, Hisamaru Tajima and Shinichiro Kawamatsu | July 21, 2024; Wrestle Peter Pan 2024 | 6:28; Pinfall | Ryōgoku Kokugikan; Tokyo, Japan | This was a six-man tag team match. Takao teamed with Makoto Oishi and Ippanjin Munenori Sawa. |
| Lost | 13–4 | Shinichiro Kawamatsu and Yuki Ishida | August 30, 2025; Wrestle Peter Pan 2025 – Day 1 | 6:32; Pinfall | Tokyo Higashin Arena; Tokyo, Japan | This was a tag team match. Takao teamed with Rukiya. |
| Lost | 13–5 | Akito, Yuki Ishida, Naomi Yoshimura, Fuminori Abe, Yuki Iino, Toru Owashi, Yuni, Ilusion, Masami Inahata, MJ Paul, Super Sasadango Machine, and Yoshihiko | August 11, 2026; Wrestle Peter Pan 2026 | 18:46; Pinfall | Ryōgoku Kokugikan; Tokyo, Japan | This was a rumble rules battle royal for the Ironman Heavymetalweight Championship. |
