= KO-D Openweight Championship =

Japanese professional wrestling championship

- The KO-D Openweight Championship belt (2022–present)

Details
- Promotion: CyberFight
- Brand: DDT Pro-Wrestling
- Date established: April 19, 2000
- Current champion: Mao
- Date won: August 11, 2026
Statistics
- First champion: Masao Orihara
- Most reigns: Harashima (10 reigns)
- Longest reign: Konosuke Takeshita (405 days)
- Shortest reign: Daisuke Sasaki, Ken Ohka, Yuki Ueno and Sanshiro Takagi (<1 day)
- Oldest champion: Jun Akiyama (51 years, 128 days)
- Youngest champion: Konosuke Takeshita (21 years, 0 days)
- Heaviest champion: Shuji Ishikawa (286 lb (130 kg))

The KO-D (King of DDT) Openweight Championship (Japanese: KO-D無差別級王座, Hepburn: KO-D Musabetsu-kyū Ōza) is a professional wrestling championship and the highest singles achievement in the DDT Pro-Wrestling (DDT) brand division of the Japanese promotion CyberFight. It is one of CyberFight's major titles, alongside the GHC Heavyweight Championship in Pro Wrestling Noah. The title was established in 2000, and Masao Orihara was the inaugural champion. Mao is the current champion in his first reign. He won the title by defeating Yuki Ueno at Wrestle Peter Pan on August 11, 2026.

== History ==
DDT Pro-Wrestling, formerly known as Dramatic Dream Team, was established in 1997. In 2000, the DDT commissioner, Exciting Yoshida, created the promotion's first championship, which was briefly called the DDT Openweight Championship. Later, the King of DDT (KO-D) was established as DDT's governing body and the title was officially named KO-D Openweight Championship. The inaugural championship match took place at the Kitazawa Town Hall, on April 19, where Masao Orihara defeated DDT founder Sanshiro Takagi in the final bout to become the first-ever champion.

On November 22, 2001, Nosawa was stripped of the championship by Exciting Yoshida for "not being appropriate as a champion", which led to the first vacancy of the title.

In December 2005, DDT announced the unveiling of a new belt to replace the worn-out original design. The new belt was put up for grabs on December 28, at Never Mind 2005, in a five-way ladder match. Danshoku Dino successfully defended his title against Sanshiro Takagi, Super Uchuu Power, Francesco Togo and Toru Owashi, ultimately winning the match and the new belt.

On December 22, 2010, the title was vacated for the second time due to an injury sustained by the reigning champion Dick Togo. Antonio Honda was originally scheduled to face Togo for the championship at Never Mind 2010 on December 26. Instead, Honda faced Gentaro to determine an interim champion. Honda emerged victorious and held the interim championship until the January 30 event, Sweet Dreams!, where he faced Togo in a unification match. Togo ultimately won the match and became the unified champion.

At CyberFight Festival 2022, on June 12, reigning champion Tetsuya Endo suffered a legitimate concussion after being struck by Katsuhiko Nakajima. Two days later, DDT held a press conference to discuss the upcoming King of DDT tournament, which was scheduled to begin on June 16. It was announced that the tournament would crown a new champion as Endo relinquished the title and forfeited his first-round match due to the injury. The vacant title was won by Kazusada Higuchi after defeating Naomi Yoshimura in the final on July 3.

=== Belt design ===
KO-D Openweight Championship belts (left-to-right): first design (2000–2005), second design (2005–2022), and current (2022–present).

The original KO-D Openweight Championship belt had five plates on a black leather strap. The center plate was rounded and featured a globe centered on the Greenwich meridian. Three banners above the globe read, from top to bottom, 'Professional Wrestling', 'D²T' and 'Dramatic Dream Team'. The lower banner at the bottom of the globe read 'Wrestling Champion'. Each side plate featured the name and flag of a country with a rich tradition in professional wrestling. From left to right, the countries were Mexico, the United States, Japan and Canada. This belt was of low quality and deteriorated quickly, leading to the introduction of a new belt in December 2005.

The second belt featured a central plate with a globe centered on the International Date Line and the second 'D²T' logo on top in red enamel. The banner above the globe read 'Professional Wrestling', and two wrestlers were depicted grappling above the banner. The two banners below the globe read 'Dramatic Dream Team' and 'KOD Open-Weight Champion'. The belt had four side plates, similar to the previous version, but with Canada and Mexico having swapped places. On March 27, 2022, at Day Dream Believer, this belt was retired and a third belt was unveiled. The new belt was given to the then champion, Tetsuya Endo.

The current belt has a central plate that features the current DDT logo. A banner above the logo reads 'Dramatic-Dream Team'. The central plate displays the words 'KO-D Open-Weight Champion' along its bottom edge. The two inner side plates depict globes, with the left plate centered on America and the right plate centered on Japan. The two outer side plates bear the DDT logo. Each plate is adorned with red gems in its corners, while the central plate also features white gems along its vertical edges.

== Reigns ==
As of November 21, 2026, there have been a total of 89 recognized reigns and three vacancies shared between 41 recognized champions and one interim champion. Masao Orihara was the first champion. Harashima holds the record for the most reigns with 10, the most combined defenses with 27, and the most combined days as champion at 1,314. Konosuke Takeshita's second reign is the longest at 405 days, while the reigns of Daisuke Sasaki, Ken Ohka, Sanshiro Takagi and Yuki Ueno are the shortest at less than a day. Jun Akiyama, who won the championship at 51 years old, is the oldest champion, while Konosuke Takeshita, who won it on his 21st birthday, is the youngest.

The current title holder is Mao, who is in his first reign. He won the title by defeating Yuki Ueno at Wrestle Peter Pan in Tokyo, Japan, on August 11, 2026.

Key
No.	Overall reign number
Reign	Reign number for the specific champion
Days	Number of days held
Defenses	Number of successful defenses
<1	Reign lasted less than a day
+	Current reign is changing daily

No.	Champion	Championship change			Reign statistics			Notes	Ref.
No.	Champion	Date	Event	Location	Reign	Days	Defenses	Notes	Ref.
1	Masao Orihara	April 19, 2000	KO-D vol. 1	Tokyo, Japan	1	98	0	Defeated Sanshiro Takagi to win the inaugural title.	
2	Koichiro Kimura	July 26, 2000	Live event	Tokyo, Japan	1	77	1		
3	Poison Sawada Julie	October 11, 2000	How About DDT?	Tokyo, Japan	1	64	1		
4	Sanshiro Takagi	December 14, 2000	Never Mind	Tokyo, Japan	1	104	2	This was a four-way match also involving Tomohiko Hashimoto and Super Uchuu Power.	
5	Exciting Yoshida	March 28, 2001	Judgement 5	Tokyo, Japan	1	93	2		
6	Nosawa	June 29, 2001	No Reason, No Future	Tokyo, Japan	1	146	0	This was a three-way match also involving Super Uchuu Power.	
—	Vacated	November 22, 2001	Live event	Tokyo, Japan	—	—	—	Nosawa was stripped of the title by the DDT Commissioner for "not being appropriate as a champion".	
7	Super Uchuu Power	November 30, 2001	DDT My Love	Tokyo, Japan	2	57	1	Defeated Poison Sawada Julie and Sanshiro Takagi in a three-way match to win the vacant title. Previously held the title under his real name of Koichiro Kimura.	
8	Mikami	January 26, 2002	Dark Horse 2002	Tokyo, Japan	1	11	1	Won a tag team match with Takashi Sasaki while Tag Team Champions, defeating Openweight Champion Super Uchuu Power and Ironman Heavymetalweight Champion Asian Cougar, with all titles on the line.	
9	Super Uchuu Power	February 6, 2002	Live event	Tokyo, Japan	3	86	0		
10	Sanshiro Takagi	May 3, 2002	Turning Point	Tokyo, Japan	2	28	0	This match was also for Takagi's Ironman Heavymetalweight Championship.	
11	Kintaro Kanemura	May 31, 2002	Max Bump 2002	Tokyo, Japan	1	99	1		
12	Sanshiro Takagi	September 7, 2002	The Ring 9.7	Chiba, Japan	3	83	1		
13	Gentaro	November 29, 2002	God Bless DDT	Tokyo, Japan	1	23	0		
14	Mikami	December 22, 2002	Never Mind 2002	Tokyo, Japan	2	207	2	This was a four-way match also involving Tomohiko Hashimoto and Sanshiro Takagi.	
15	Takashi Sasaki	July 17, 2003	Audience 2003	Tokyo, Japan	1	101	2		
16	Shoichi Ichimiya	October 26, 2003	Dead or Alive 2003	Tokyo, Japan	1	108	0	This was a Chain Death Match.	
17	Poison Sawada Julie	February 11, 2004	Future Port	Tokyo, Japan	2	265	4	This was a four-way match also involving Sanshiro Takagi and Danshoku Dino in which Dino's Ironman Heavymetalweight Champion was also on the line.	
18	Mikami	November 2, 2004	Day Dream Believer 2004	Tokyo, Japan	3	89	1		
19	Dick Togo	January 30, 2005	Into The Fight 2005	Tokyo, Japan	1	94	2		
20	Sanshiro Takagi	May 4, 2005	Max Bump 2005	Tokyo, Japan	4	172	1		
21	Danshoku Dino	October 23, 2005	Day Dream Believer 2005	Tokyo, Japan	1	161	1		
22	Toru Owashi	April 2, 2006	After Aprilfool 2006	Tokyo, Japan	1	271	2		
23	Harashima	December 29, 2006	Never Mind 2006	Tokyo, Japan	1	156	3		
24	Koo	June 3, 2007	King of DDT 2007	Tokyo, Japan	1	140	2		
25	Harashima	October 21, 2007	Day Dream Believer 2007	Tokyo, Japan	2	198	2		
26	Dick Togo	May 6, 2008	Max Bump 2008	Tokyo, Japan	2	145	2	This was a five-way elimination match also involving Seiya Morohashi, Sanshiro Takagi and Yoshiaki Yago.	
27	Sanshiro Takagi	September 28, 2008	Who's Gonna Top? 2008	Tokyo, Japan	5	218	5	This was a Title vs. Title Steel Cage Death Match, also for Dick Togo's DDT Extreme Championship.	
28	Harashima	May 4, 2009	Max Bump 2009	Tokyo, Japan	3	111	2		
29	Kota Ibushi	August 23, 2009	Ryōgoku Peter Pan	Tokyo, Japan	1	98	2		
30	Shuji Ishikawa	November 29, 2009	DDT Special 2009	Tokyo, Japan	2	91	2	Ishikawa previously held the title under the name Koo.	
31	Daisuke Sekimoto	February 28, 2010	Yuki Konkon Arare ya Union	Tokyo, Japan	1	147	4	This was a Union Pro Wrestling branded event.	
32	Harashima	July 25, 2010	Ryōgoku Peter Pan 2010	Tokyo, Japan	4	112	2		
33	Hikaru Sato	November 14, 2010	Osaka Bay Blues Special	Osaka, Japan	1	14	0		
34	Dick Togo	November 28, 2010	God Bless DDT 2010	Tokyo, Japan	3	24	0		
—	Vacated	December 22, 2010	—	—	—	—	—	Title vacated due to Togo suffering an injury.	
—	Antonio Honda	December 26, 2010	Never Mind 2010	Tokyo, Japan	—	35	0	Antonio Honda defeated Gentaro to become interim KO-D Openweight Champion.	
35	Dick Togo	January 30, 2011	Sweet Dreams! 2011	Tokyo, Japan	4	94	2	This was a title unification match for Togo's KO-D Openweight Title and Honda's interim title.	
36	Shuji Ishikawa	May 4, 2011	Max Bump 2011	Tokyo, Japan	3	81	2		
37	Kudo	July 24, 2011	Ryōgoku Peter Pan 2011	Tokyo, Japan	1	189	5		
38	Danshoku Dino	January 29, 2012	Sweet Dreams! 2012	Tokyo, Japan	2	63	2		
39	Sanshiro Takagi	April 1, 2012	Aprilfool 2012	Tokyo, Japan	6	<1	0		
40	Masa Takanashi	April 1, 2012	Aprilfool 2012	Tokyo, Japan	1	33	0	Takanashi cashed in his Right to Challenge Anytime Anywhere contract.	
41	Yuji Hino	May 4, 2012	Max Bump 2012	Tokyo, Japan	1	51	1		
42	Kota Ibushi	June 24, 2012	What Are You Doing!? 2012	Tokyo, Japan	2	98	2		
43	El Generico	September 30, 2012	Who's Gonna Top? 2012	Tokyo, Japan	1	84	3		
44	Kenny Omega	December 23, 2012	Never Mind 2012	Tokyo, Japan	1	87	3		
45	Shigehiro Irie	March 20, 2013	Judgement 2013	Tokyo, Japan	1	151	8		
46	Harashima	August 18, 2013	Ryōgoku Peter Pan 2013	Tokyo, Japan	5	215	5		
47	Kudo	March 21, 2014	Judgement 2014	Tokyo, Japan	2	65	2		
48	Harashima	May 25, 2014	Friendship, Effort, Victory! in Nagoya 2014	Nagoya, Japan	6	266	7		
49	Kota Ibushi	February 15, 2015	Saitama Super DDT 2015	Saitama, Japan	3	73	1		
50	Harashima	April 29, 2015	Max Bump 2015	Tokyo, Japan	7	32	1		
51	Kudo	May 31, 2015	Audience 2015	Tokyo, Japan	3	28	0		
52	Ken Ohka	June 28, 2015	King of DDT 2015 Tokyo	Tokyo, Japan	1	<1	0	This was a three-way match, also involving Yasu Urano. Both Ohka and Urano cashed in their Right to Challenge Anytime Anywhere contracts.	
53	Kudo	June 28, 2015	King of DDT 2015 Tokyo	Tokyo, Japan	4	56	0		
54	Yukio Sakaguchi	August 23, 2015	Ryōgoku Peter Pan 2015	Tokyo, Japan	1	97	2		
55	Isami Kodaka	November 28, 2015	Osaka Octopus 2015	Osaka, Japan	1	114	3		
56	Harashima	March 21, 2016	Judgement 2016: DDT 19th Anniversary	Tokyo, Japan	8	34	2		
57	Daisuke Sasaki	April 24, 2016	Max Bump 2016	Tokyo, Japan	1	35	1	Sasaki cashed in his Right to Challenge Anytime Anywhere contract.	
58	Konosuke Takeshita	May 29, 2016	Audience 2016	Tokyo, Japan	1	91	3		
59	Shuji Ishikawa	August 28, 2016	Ryōgoku Peter Pan 2016	Tokyo, Japan	4	98	2		
60	Harashima	December 4, 2016	Osaka Octopus 2016	Osaka, Japan	9	106	3		
61	Konosuke Takeshita	March 20, 2017	Judgement 2017: DDT 20th Anniversary	Saitama, Japan	2	405	11		
62	Shigehiro Irie	April 29, 2018	Max Bump 2018	Tokyo, Japan	2	94	4		
63	Sami Callihan	August 1, 2018	Rockstar Pro Wrestling Amped	Dayton, Ohio	1	7	0	This was a three-way match also involving Trey Miguel.	
64	Shigehiro Irie	August 8, 2018	Rockstar Pro Wrestling Amped	Dayton, Ohio	3	6	0		
65	Danshoku Dino	August 14, 2018	MajiManji	Tokyo, Japan	3	14	0	Dino cashed in his Right to Challenge Anytime Anywhere contract.	
66	Meiko Satomura	August 28, 2018	MajiManji	Tokyo, Japan	1	26	0	Satomura cashed in her Right to Challenge Anytime Anywhere contract. Satomura was the first woman to win the KO-D Openweight Championship.	
67	Danshoku Dino	September 23, 2018	Road to Ryōgoku 2018	Tokyo, Japan	4	28	0	This was a three–way elimination match also involving Shigehiro Irie.	
68	Daisuke Sasaki	October 21, 2018	Ryōgoku Peter Pan 2018	Tokyo, Japan	2	119	1		
69	Konosuke Takeshita	February 17, 2019	Judgement 2019: DDT 22nd Anniversary	Tokyo, Japan	3	46	1		
70	Daisuke Sasaki	April 4, 2019	DDT Is Coming to America	Queens, New York	3	<1	0		
71	Tetsuya Endo	April 4, 2019	DDT Is Coming to America	Queens, New York	1	102	4	Endo cashed in his Right to Challenge Anytime Anywhere contract.	
72	Konosuke Takeshita	July 15, 2019	Wrestle Peter Pan 2019	Tokyo, Japan	4	111	2		
73	Harashima	November 3, 2019	Ultimate Party 2019	Tokyo, Japan	10	84	1	This match was also for Harashima's DDT Extreme Championship.	
74	Masato Tanaka	January 26, 2020	Sweet Dreams! 2020	Tokyo, Japan	1	133	4		
75	Tetsuya Endo	June 7, 2020	Wrestle Peter Pan 2020	Tokyo, Japan	2	252	3		
76	Jun Akiyama	February 14, 2021	Kawasaki Strong 2021	Tokyo, Japan	1	188	3		
77	Konosuke Takeshita	August 21, 2021	Wrestle Peter Pan 2021	Kawasaki, Japan	5	211	2		
78	Tetsuya Endo	March 20, 2022	Judgement 2022: DDT 25th Anniversary	Tokyo, Japan	3	86	1		
—	Vacated	June 14, 2022	—	—	—	—	—	Endo vacated the title after having suffered a concussion on June 12, at CyberFight Festival 2022.	
79	Kazusada Higuchi	July 3, 2022	King of DDT 2022 Final	Tokyo, Japan	1	210	5	Defeated Naomi Yoshimura in the finals of the 2022 King of DDT Tournament to win the vacant title.	
80	Yuji Hino	January 29, 2023	Sweet Dreams! 2023	Tokyo, Japan	2	175	2		
81	Chris Brookes	July 23, 2023	Wrestle Peter Pan 2023	Tokyo, Japan	1	112	2		
82	Yuki Ueno	November 12, 2023	Ultimate Party 2023	Tokyo, Japan	1	287	7		
83	Shinya Aoki	August 25, 2024	Summer Vacation Memories 2024	Tokyo, Japan	1	71	3		
84	Chris Brookes	November 4, 2024	Sumida Dramatic Dream!	Tokyo, Japan	2	237	4		
85	Kazusada Higuchi	June 29, 2025	King of Kings	Tokyo, Japan	2	63	2		
86	Yuki Ueno	August 31, 2025	Wrestle Peter Pan 2025	Tokyo, Japan	2	<1	0		
87	Kazuki Hirata	August 31, 2025	Wrestle Peter Pan 2025	Tokyo, Japan	1	28	2	Hirata cashed in his Right to Challenge Anytime Anywhere contract.	
88	Yuki Ueno	September 28, 2025	Dramatic Infinity 2025	Tokyo, Japan	3	317	8	Ueno cashed in his Right to Challenge Anytime Anywhere contract.	
89	Mao	August 11, 2026	Wrestle Peter Pan	Tokyo, Japan	1	102+	5		

== Combined reigns ==
As of November 21, 2026.

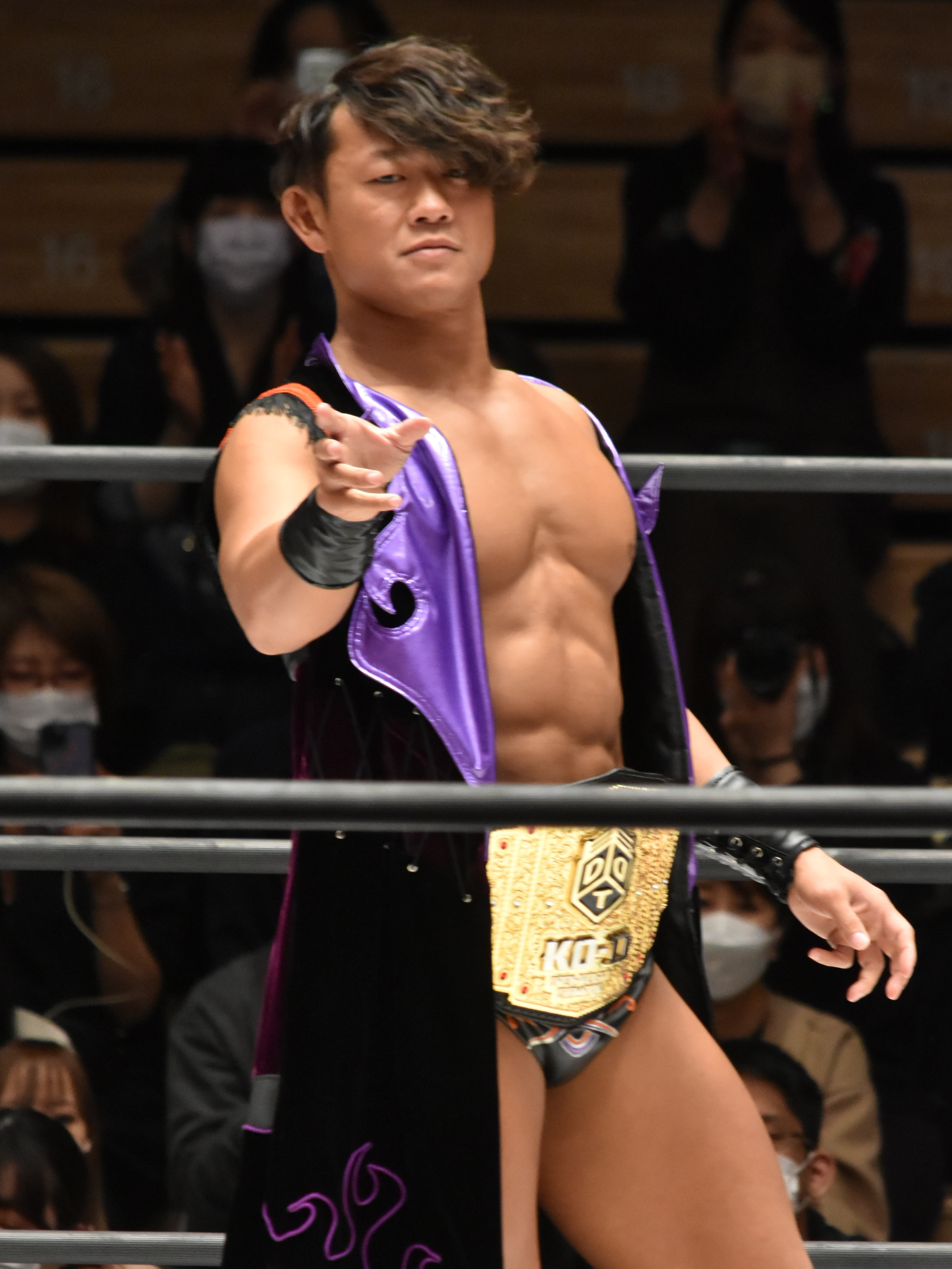
Three-time champion Tetsuya Endo was the first recipient of the third belt.

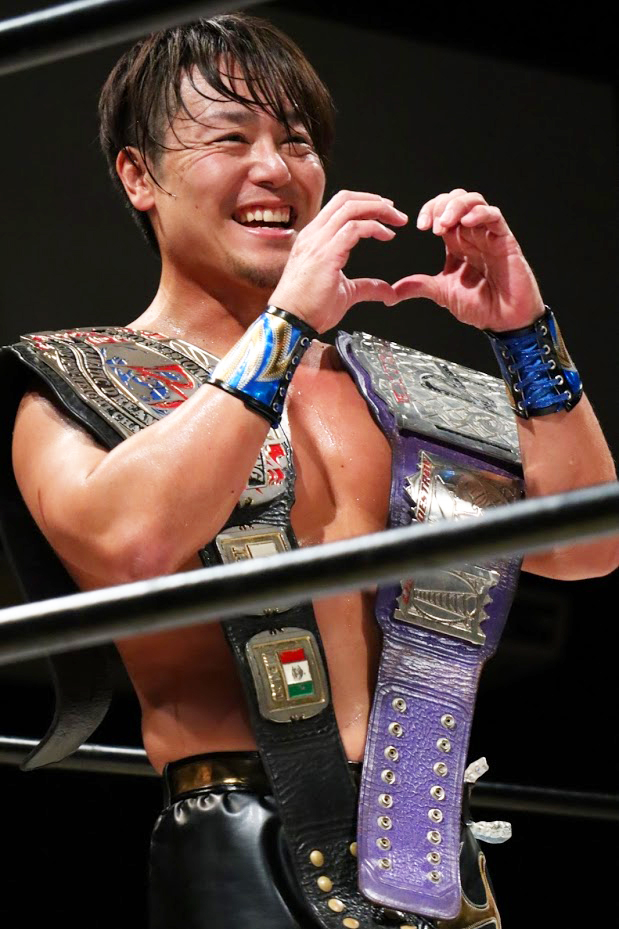
Harashima, who holds the record for the most reigns (10), combined defenses (27), and combined days as champion (1,314).

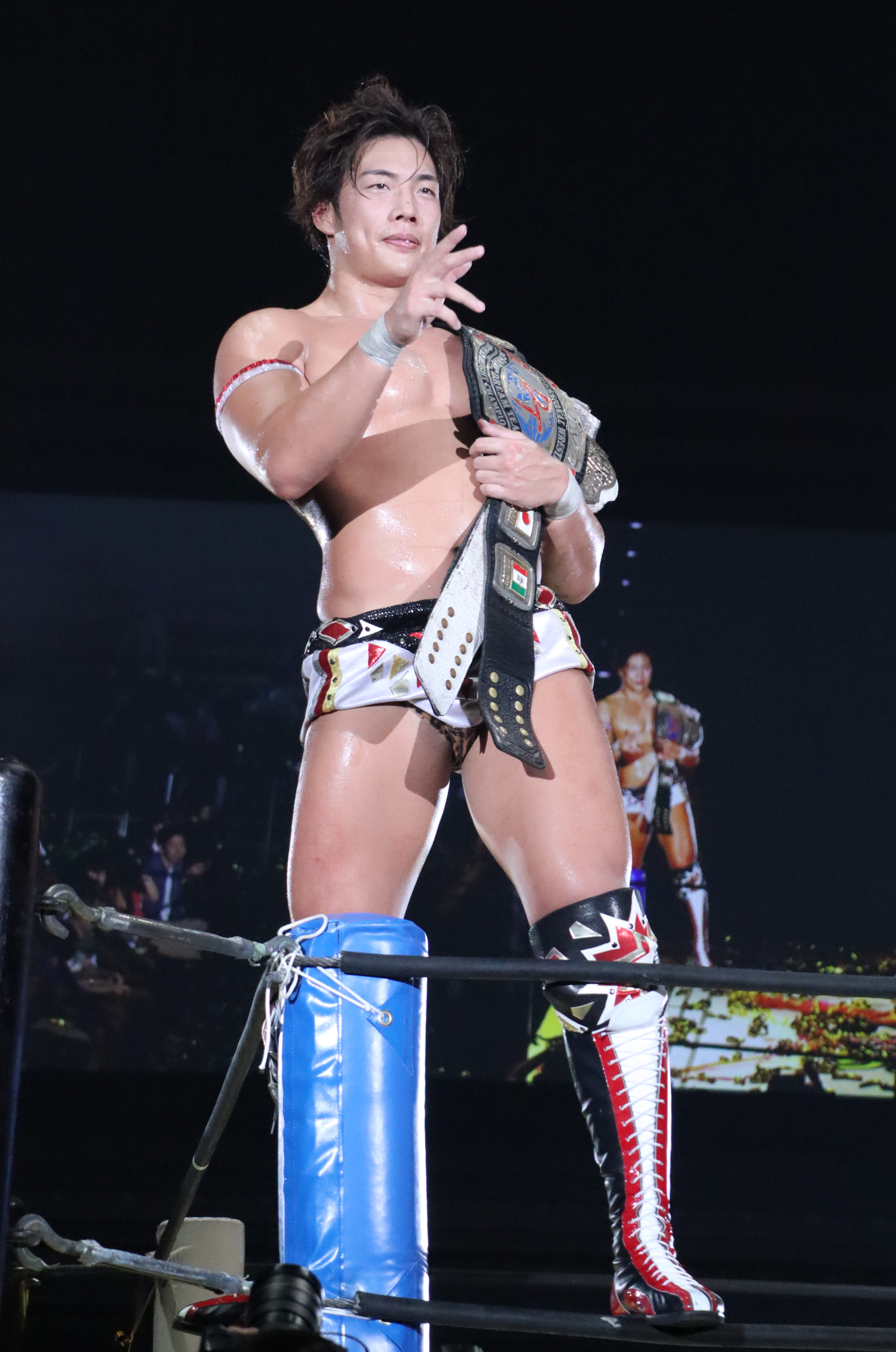
Konosuke Takeshita, five-time champion and longest reign record holder at 405 days.

†	Indicates the current champions

Rank	Wrestler	No. of reigns	Combined defenses	Combined days
1	Harashima	10	27	1,314
2	Konosuke Takeshita	5	19	864
3	Sanshiro Takagi	6	9	605
4	Yuki Ueno	3	15	604
5	Tetsuya Endo	3	8	440
6	Shuji Ishikawa/Koo	4	8	410
7	Dick Togo	4	9	357
8	Chris Brookes	2	6	349
9	Kudo	4	7	338
10	Poison Sawada Julie	2	5	329
11	Mikami	3	4	307
12	Kazusada Higuchi	2	7	273
13	Toru Owashi	1	2	271
14	Kota Ibushi	3	5	269
15	Danshoku Dino	4	3	266
16	Shigehiro Irie	3	12	253
17	Yuji Hino	2	3	226
18	Koichiro Kimura/Super Uchuu Power	3	2	220
19	Jun Akiyama	1	3	188
20	Daisuke Sasaki	3	2	159
21	Daisuke Sekimoto	1	4	147
22	Nosawa	1	0	146
23	Masato Tanaka	1	4	133
24	Isami Kodaka	1	3	114
25	Shoichi Ichimiya	1	0	108
26	Mao †	1	5	102+
27	Takashi Sasaki	1	2	101
28	Kintaro Kanemura	1	1	99
29	Masao Orihara	1	0	98
30	Yukio Sakaguchi	1	2	97
31	Exciting Yoshida	1	2	93
32	Kenny Omega	1	3	87
33	El Generico	1	3	84
34	Shinya Aoki	1	3	71
—	Antonio Honda	—	0	35
35	Masa Takanashi	1	0	33
36	Kazuki Hirata	1	2	28
37	Meiko Satomura	1	0	26
38	Gentaro	1	0	23
39	Hikaru Sato	1	0	14
40	Sami Callihan	1	0	7
41	Ken Ohka	1	0	<1

== See also ==
- Professional wrestling in Japan
