= Mao (wrestler) =

Japanese wrestler (born 1997)

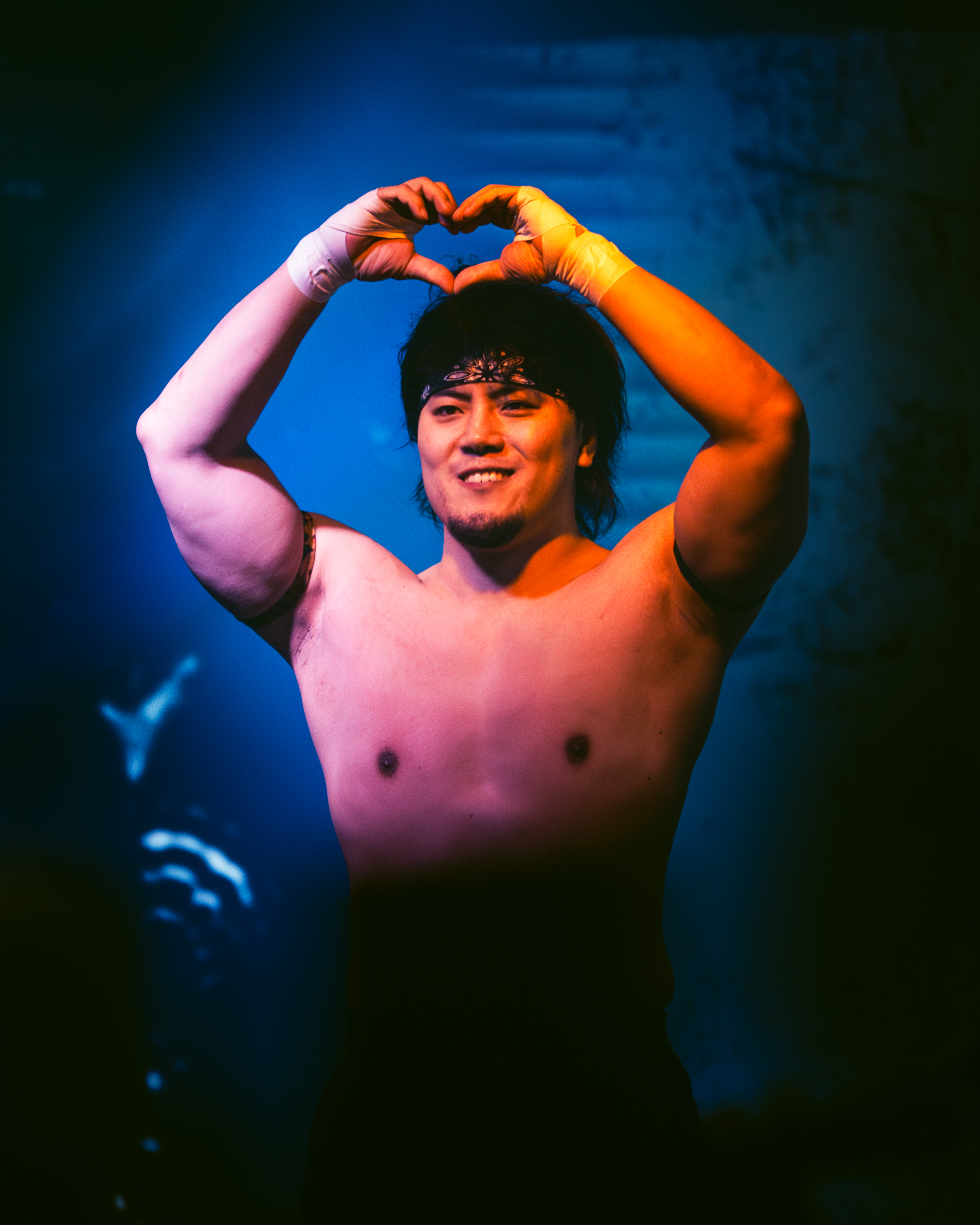
- Mao in April 2025

Personal information
- Born: January 28, 1997 (age 29) Osaki, Miyagi, Japan

Professional wrestling career
- Ring name(s): Mao Inoue; Mao
- Billed height: 1.77 m (5 ft 10 in)
- Billed weight: 80 kg (176 lb)
- Trained by: Yasu Urano
- Debut: 2015

Mao Inoue (井上麻生, Inoue Mao; born January 28, 1997), better known mononymously as Mao (stylized in all caps), is a Japanese professional wrestler. As of 2015, he is signed to DDT Pro-Wrestling (DDT), where he is the leader of Strange Love Connection and is the current KO-D Openweight Champion in his first reign.

== Professional wrestling career ==
=== Independent circuit (2015–present) ===
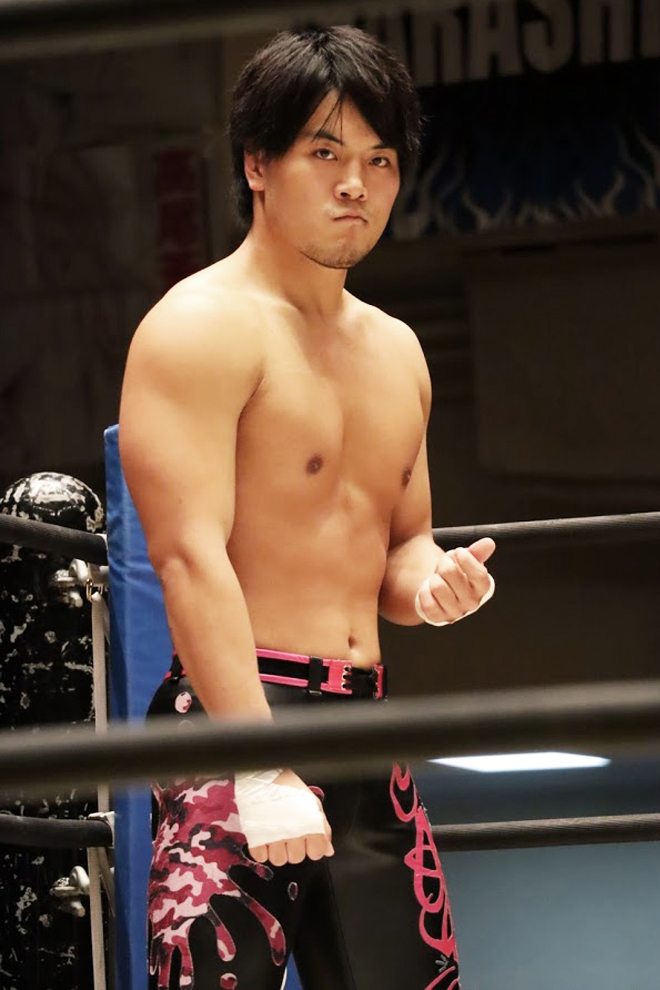
Mao in 2018

Mao made his professional wrestling debut as Mao Inoue at DDT Pro-Wrestling's Ryōgoku Peter Pan 2015 event from August 23, 2015, where he teamed up with Mizuki Watase and Kota Umeda, losing to Ryota Nakatsu and Smile Squash (Akito and Yasu Urano) in a six-man tag team match. He is known for tenures with other promotions such as Pro Wrestling Noah, participating in the NOAH Summer Navigation 2017 ~ 11th Global Junior Heavyweight Tag League ~ multiple-night event where he teamed up with his New Wrestling Aidoru (NωA) stablemate Shunma Katsumata. They faced other infamous wrestlers such as Ratel's (Hayata and Yo-Hey) which they defeated on July 15, and Phil Atlas and Seiya Morohashi whom they lost to on July 16. A couple of months later, on the second night of The Great Voyage 2017 In Yokohama event from October 1, 2017, Mao and Katsumata challenged Hayata and Yo-Hey again, third time for the GHC Junior Heavyweight Tag Team Championship but unsuccessfully. Mao worked for Evolve, teaming up with Konosuke Takeshita to unsuccessfully challenge The Unwanted (Eddie Kingston and Joe Gacy) for the Evolve Tag Team Championship at EVOLVE 125 on April 4, 2019. On April 18, 2019, he made an appearance for Oriental Wrestling Entertainment on the first night of OWE First Time Japan event, where he teamed up with Kazuki Hirata and Yuki Ueno to defeat Michael Nakazawa, Tang Huaqi and Yang Hao. At the Revolution Pro Wrestling's Live At The Cockpit 47 show, Mao teamed up with Mike Bailey as Moonlight Express to defeat Deadly Sins (JK Moody & Kane Khan) for the SWE Tag Team Championship.

On April 5, 2025, it was announced that Mao will participate in New Japan Pro Wrestling's 2025 Best of the Super Juniors tournament.

=== DDT Pro-Wrestling (2015–present) ===
Mao worked almost his entire career for DDT, where he is a former KO-D 6-Man Tag Team Champion alongside Makoto Oishi and Shunma Katsumata as NωA, title which they won at Judgement 2017: DDT 20th Anniversary on March 20 after defeating Kazusada Higuchi, Kouki Iwasaki and Mizuki Watase. On July 22, 2018, at Summer Vacation, Mao teamed up with Mike Bailey to defeat Damnation (Mad Paulie and Tetsuya Endo to win the KO-D Tag Team Championship. Mao is a former multiple-time Ironman Heavymetalweight Champion, last time winning it at WrestleCon Joey Ryan's Penis Party, a freelance event held and produced by Joey Ryan, in a 7-person gauntlet match also involving Danshoku Dino, Makoto Oishi, Sanshiro Takagi, Antonio Honda, Maki Itoh and Yoshihiko (a love doll).

== Championships and accomplishments ==
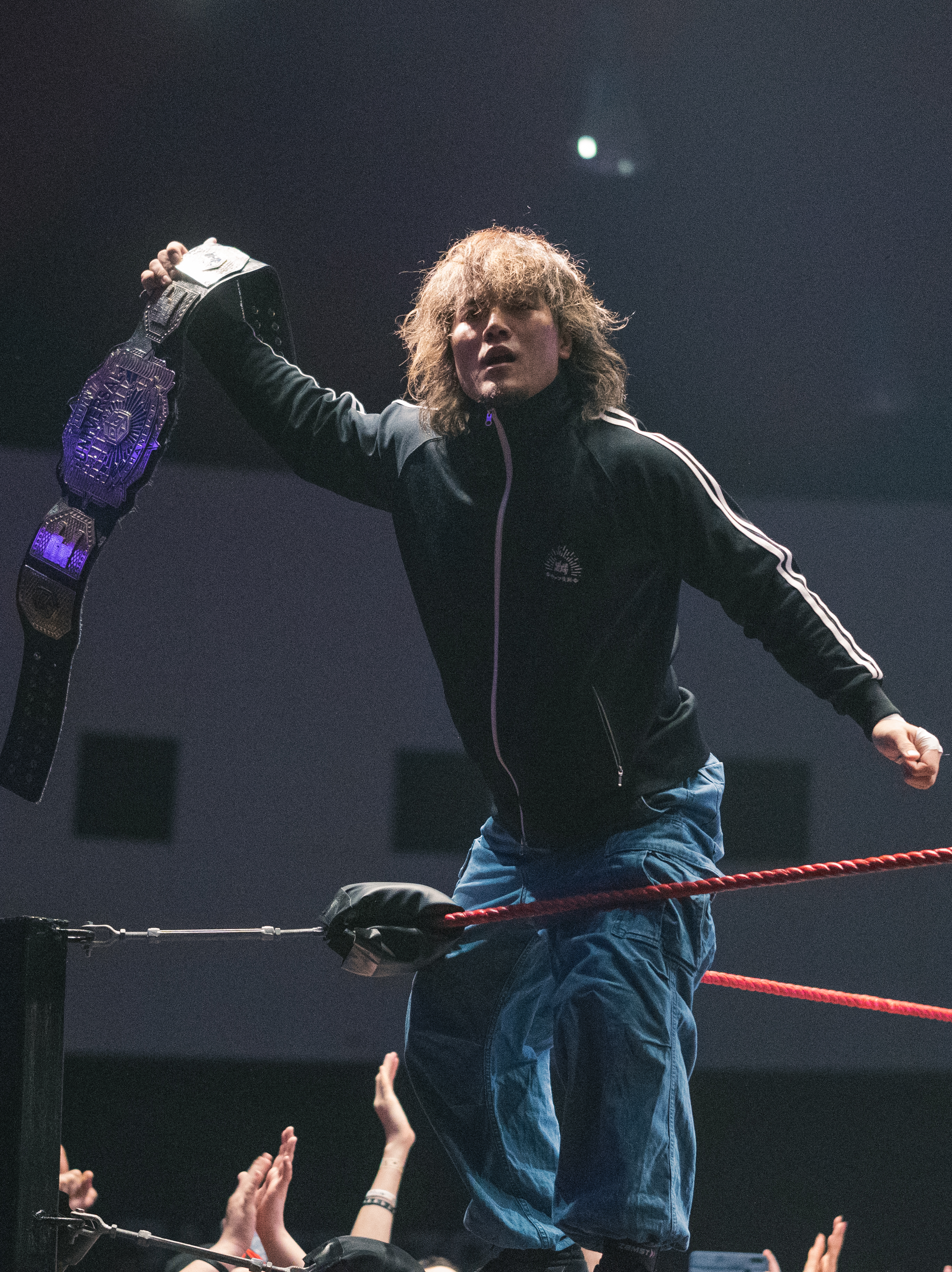
In DDT Pro-Wrestling, Mao is a three-time DDT Universal Champion.

- Banger Zone Wrestling
  - BZW Tag Team Championship (1 time) – with Yoshihiko
- DDT Pro-Wrestling
  - KO-D Openweight Championship (1 time, current)
  - DDT Universal Championship (3 times)
  - Ironman Heavymetalweight Championship (8 times)
  - KO-D 6-Man Tag Team Championship (1 time) – with Shunma Katsumata and Makoto Oishi
  - KO-D 10-Man Tag Team Championship (1 time) – with Yuki Ueno, Shunma Katsumata, Toy Kojima and Shinya Aoki
  - KO-D Tag Team Championship (6 times) – with Mike Bailey (1), Asuka (1), Shunma Katsumata (2), To-y (1) and Kanon (1)
  - King of DDT Tournament (2024)
  - Hanami King Of Drunk Preliminary Rumble (2025) with - Daisuke Sasaki
  - Hanami King Of Drunk (2025)
- Kaientai Dojo/Active Advance Pro Wrestling
  - Strongest-K Tag Team Championship (1 time) – with Mike Bailey
- Pro Wrestling Illustrated
  - Ranked No. 88 of the top 500 singles wrestlers in the PWI 500 in 2024
- Revolution Pro Wrestling/Southside Wrestling Entertainment
  - SWE Tag Team Championship (1 time) – with Mike Bailey
