= Kazusada Higuchi =

Japanese pro wrestler, former sumo wrestler

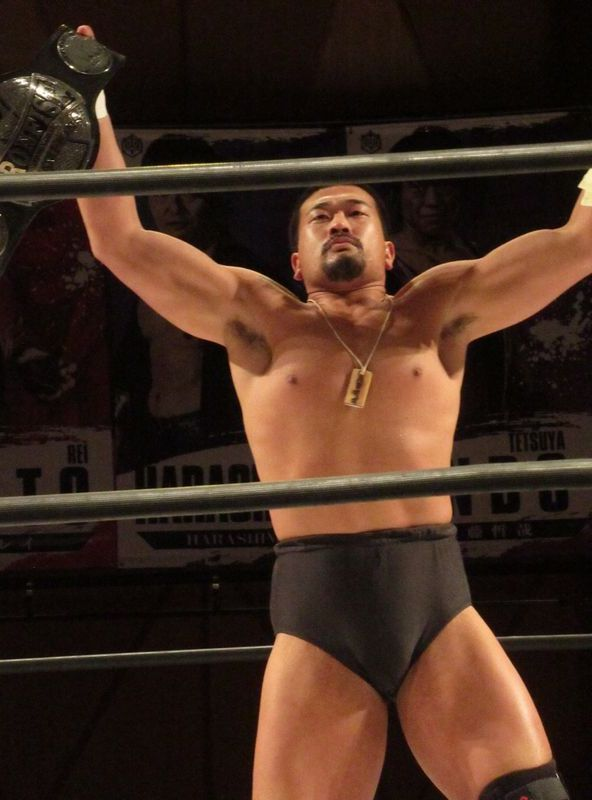
- Higuchi in December 2023

Personal information
- Born: October 24, 1988 (age 37) Monbetsu, Japan

Professional wrestling career
- Ring names: Kazusada Higuchi; Kazuko Higuchi; Mammoth Higuchi
- Billed height: 1.85 m (6 ft 1 in)
- Billed weight: 110 kg (243 lb)
- Debut: November 28, 2014
- Retired: April 5, 2026

Kazusada Higuchi (樋口和貞, Higuchi Kazusada; born October 24, 1988) is a Japanese retired professional wrestler and sumo rikishi (sumo wrestler). He is best known for his time in Japanese professional wrestling promotion DDT Pro-Wrestling (DDT), where he is a two-time KO-D Openweight Champion. As a sumo rikishi, he was known as Hokudōzan (北道山); as a member of the Hakkaku stable, his highest rank was makushita 45.

From January 2020 to July 2022, he was a member of Eruption (エラップション, Erappushon; stylized in English text), alongside Yukio Sakaguchi, Saki Akai, and later Hideki Okatani. Amid his departure, he created Harimao (ハリマオ, Harimao) with Naomi Yoshimura and Yuki Ishida. He captured both the KO-D Tag Team and KO-D 6-Man Tag Team titles in his run with both stables. He won the 2022 and 2025 King of DDT tournaments, won the vacant KO-D Openweight Championship in his first 2022 victory, and won the title in the challenge subsequent to the 2025 victory at the King of Kings event. He won the Japan Indie Awards' MVP Award in 2022 for his accomplishments in DDT. His retirement was announced on March 23, 2026, and his retirement ceremony to confirm it will be held on the April 5 DDT Korakuen Hall event.

== Sumo career ==
Hokudōzan Kazusada

Personal information
- Native name: 北道山 和貞
- Born: Kazusada Higuchi; 24 October 1988 (age 37) Monbetsu, Hokkaido, Japan
- Height: 1.86 m (6 ft 1 in)
- Weight: 106 kg (234 lb)

Sport
- Sport: Sumo
- Retired: January, 2014
- Heya: Hakkaku
- Record: 140-128-12
- Debut: March, 2007
- Highest rank: Makushita 45 (May, 2013)
- Updated on April 1, 2023

At Hokkaido Monbetsukita High School, he was the captain of the judo club. After winning third place in both the individual and team competitions at the 2006 All-Hokkaido High School Athletic Federation Tournament, he was scouted by the 8th Hakkaku oyakata (former yokozuna Hokutoumi) and started training in sumo wrestling at the Hakkaku stable.

He made his professional debut in the March 2007 tournament (honbasho). He struggled for two years in the jonidan division before changing his ring name (shikona) from his real name to Hokudōzan (北道山), after the character Hokudōzan Tsuyoshi from the manga series Aah! Harimanada. He then started to produce stronger results, was promoted to sandanme in July 2009, and eventually to makushita in November 2011. He reached his highest rank of makushita 45 in May 2013 and retired in January 2014.

According to a 2020 interview, he initially joined sumo as a way of preparing for a professional wrestling career.

== Professional wrestling career ==
=== Independent circuit (2014–2025) ===
Higuchi made his professional wrestling debut at DDT Pro-Wrestling's DDT Dramatic Fanclub Vol. 1, event from October 18, 2014, where he defeated Kota Umeda. He worked a match at BJW/DDT/K-DOJO Toshikoshi Pro-Wrestling 2015, a cross-over event held between Big Japan Pro-Wrestling, DDT, and Kaientai Dojo from December 31, where he teamed up with Yoshihisa Uto, falling short to Harashima and Yuko Miyamoto in the Shuffle Tag Tournament. Higuchi participated in the Block B of the Pro Wrestling Noah 2018 Global League, where he scored 6 points after facing Go Shiozaki, Kaito Kiyomiya, Muhammad Yone, Takashi Sugiura, Atsushi Kotoge, Maybach Taniguchi and Cody Hall. At TJP The God Of Pro Wrestling - My Arms Fell! event of Tokyo Joshi Pro Wrestling from December 27, 2018, Higuchi teamed up with Antonio Honda in a losing effort to Disaster Box (Harashima and Yuki Ueno). He worked a match for Evolve/WWN, at EVOLVE 125, from April 4, 2019, where he defeated Curt Stallion. One day later, at WWNLive SuperShow - Mercury Rising 2019, on April 5, he challenged JD Drake for the WWN Championship but unsuccessfully.

=== DDT Pro-Wrestling (2014–2026) ===
Higuchi is a multiple-time KO-D 6-Man Tag Team Champion, title which he won on different occasions. His first title reign began at Into The Fight 2016, where he teamed up with Kouki Iwasaki and Shunma Katsumata to defeat T2Hii (Kazuki Hirata, Sanshiro Takagi and Toru Owashi). In the second reign, he held the titles with Kouki Iwasaki and Mizuki Watase, winning them at Best Western Lariat Series 2017 on January 22, by defeating Shuten-dōji (Kudo, Masahiro Takanashi and Yukio Sakaguchi) in a three-way tag team match also involving Antonio Honda, Konosuke Takeshita and Trans-Am★Hiroshi. In the third reign, he won the titles alongside fellow Eruption stablemates Yukio Sakaguchi and Saki Akai at DDT TV Show! #7 from June 20, 2020. Higuchi is also a KO-D Tag Team Champion, title which he won with Yukio Sakaguchi again under the Eruption banner, at Road to Ultimate Party 2020 on October 25. At Judgement 2018: DDT 21st Anniversary, Higuchi teamed up with Daisuke Sekimoto as SekiGuchi to defeat Harashima and Naomichi Marufuji for the KO-D Tag Team Championship.

On July 3, 2022, Higuchi won the 2022 King of DDT Tournament by defeating Naomi Yoshimura in the final, and consequently won the KO-D Openweight Championship. He defended the title five times before eventually losing it to Yuji Hino on January 29, 2023, at Sweet Dreams! 2023.

On March 23, 2026, Higuchi announced he will be retiring from professional wrestling due to a neck injury following his final match set to take place on April 5, 2026, ending his near 12-year career.

== Sumo career record ==
Hokudōzan Kazusada
Year	January Hatsu basho, Tokyo	March Haru basho, Osaka	May Natsu basho, Tokyo	July Nagoya basho, Nagoya	September Aki basho, Tokyo	November Kyūshū basho, Fukuoka
2007	x	(Maezumo)	West Jonokuchi #25; 5–2	East Jonidan #105; 4–3	East Jonidan #77; 5–2	West Jonidan #34; 4–3
2008	East Jonidan #11; 3–4	East Jonidan #31; 4–3	West Jonidan #6; 3–4	West Jonidan #25; 3–4	East Jonidan #48; 3–4	West Jonidan #70; 4–3
2009	West Jonidan #47; 3–4	West Jonidan #69; 5–2	East Jonidan #25; 5–2	East Sandanme #88; 3–4	East Jonidan #7; 3–4	West Jonidan #21; 5–2
2010	West Sandanme #84; 3–4	West Sandanme #96; 2–5	East Jonidan #26; 5–2	West Sandanme #87; 3–4	East Jonidan #5; 4–3	West Sandanme #87; 5–2
2011	East Sandanme #53; 4–3	West Sandanme #37; Tournament Cancelled ––	West Sandanme #37; 1–1–5	East Sandanme #61; 4–3	West Sandanme #42; 6–1	East Makushita #55; 2–5
2012	West Sandanme #21; 1–6	East Sandanme #60; 4–3	East Sandanme #44; 4–3	West Sandanme #27; 5–2	East Sandanme #2; 4–3	East Makushita #55; 4–3
2013	West Makushita #46; 3–4	East Makushita #56; 4–3	West Makushita #45; 1–6	West Sandanme #10; 5–2	East Makushita #51; 3–4	East Sandanme #5; 1–6
2014	East Sandanme #35; Retired; 0–0–7	x	x	x	x	x
Record given as wins–losses–absences Top division champion Top division runner-up Retired Lower divisions Non-participation Sanshō key: F=Fighting spirit; O=Outstanding performance; T=Technique Also shown: ★=Kinboshi; P=Playoff(s); Divisions: Makuuchi — Jūryō — Makushita — Sandanme — Jonidan — Jonokuchi Makuuchi ranks: Yokozuna — Ōzeki — Sekiwake — Komusubi — Maegashira

== Championships and accomplishments ==
- DDT Pro-Wrestling

- KO-D Openweight Championship (2 times)
- KO-D Tag Team Championship (4 times) – with Shigehiro Irie (1), Daisuke Sekimoto (1), Yukio Sakaguchi (1) and Naomi Yoshimura (1)
- KO-D 6-Man Tag Team Championship (4 times) – with Shunma Katsumata and Kouki Iwasaki (1), Kouki Iwasaki and Mizuki Watase (1), Saki Akai and Yukio Sakaguchi (1), and Ryota Nakatsu and Yuki Ishida (1)
- King of DDT Tournament (2022, 2025)
- Pro-Wrestling Koshien (2015)

- Japan Indie Awards

- MVP Award (2022)
- Newcomer Award (2014)

- Pro-Wrestling Basara
  - Iron Fist Tag Team Championship (1 time) – with Ryota Nakatsu
  - Iron Fist Tag Tournament (2023) – with Ryota Nakatsu
- Pro Wrestling Illustrated
  - Ranked No. 55 of the 500 best singles wrestlers in the PWI 500 in 2023
- Wrestling Observer Newsletter

- Ranked No. 4 on the top 10 of the 2015 Rookie Of The Year
