= Toru Owashi =

Japanese professional wrestler (born 1975)

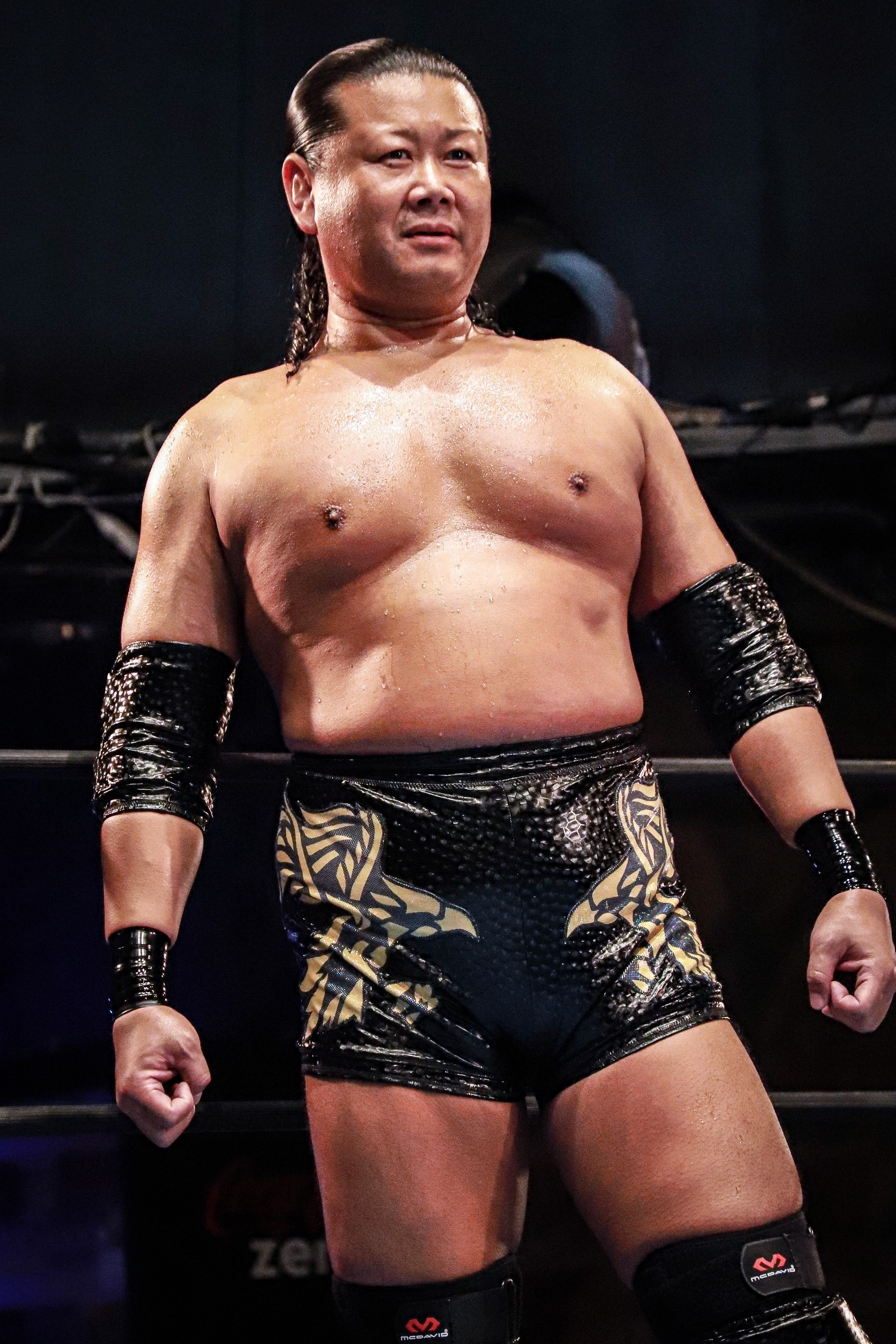
- Owashi in July 2023

Personal information
- Born: Toru Ito (伊藤 透, Itō Tōru); December 24, 1975 (age 50) Saku, Nagano

Professional wrestling career
- Ring name(s): Peach Owashi; Toru Orochi; Toru Owashi
- Billed height: 1.85 m (6 ft 1 in)
- Billed weight: 120 kg (265 lb)
- Trained by: Último Dragón; Jorge Rivera
- Debut: September 2, 2000

Toru Ito (伊藤 透, Itō Tōru; born December 24, 1975) is a Japanese professional wrestler, better known by his ring name Toru Owashi (大鷲 透, Ōwashi Tōru). He is best known for his work in DDT Pro-Wrestling, where he is a former KO-D Openweight Champion and two-time KO-D Tag Team Champion.

== Sumo career ==
Asawashi Tōru
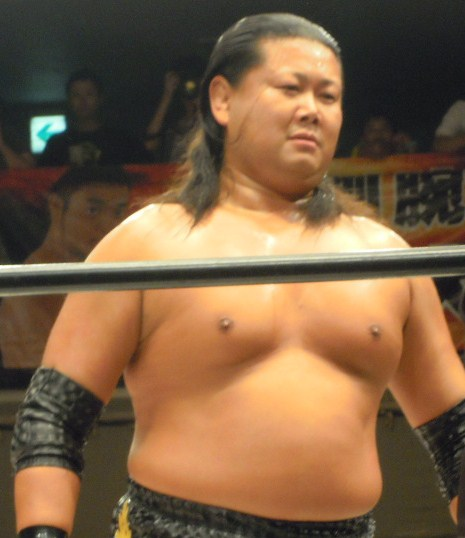

Personal information
- Native name: 朝鷲 透
- Born: Itō Tōru; 24 December 1975 (age 50) Saku, Nagano
- Height: 1.83 m (6 ft 0 in)
- Weight: 96.5 kg (213 lb)

Sport
- Sport: Sumo
- Retired: January, 1999
- Heya: Wakamatsu
- Record: 99-104-28
- Debut: March, 1993
- Highest rank: Jonidan 42 (January, 1999)
- Updated on Nov. 2023

Initially aspiring to become a sumo wrestler like his father, former maegashira 3 Ōwashi Hitoshi, Ito joined the Wakamatsu stable in 1993 and adopted the shikona of Asaitō, which he later changed to Asawashi, meaning "Morning Eagle" in Japanese. However, he ended up leaving the sport due to a recurrent knee injury in January 1999, after having reached his highest rank of jonidan 42. His career record was 99 wins to 104 losses, with 28 absences due to injury. He worked as a chef until joining the Ultimo Dragon Gym in order to become a professional wrestler.

== Professional wrestling career ==
=== Toryumon (2000–2004) ===
He made his debut under his real name on September 2, 2000, in Mexico, defeating Masato Yoshino. He soon adopted the name of Toru Owashi and the character of a strong, villainous loner. On December 2, 2001, he won the 2001 Young Dragons Cup by defeating Kawabata in the semi-final, then Shuji Kondo in the final. After being moved along with his entire class to Toryumon 2000 Project, he went to gain victories over Shuji Kondo, Jun Ogawauchi and the Syachihoko Machines. He was made the enforcer of Hagure Gundan, also known as Aagan Iisou, a stable commanded by Kondo.

He also wrestled for Dragondoor and El Dorado Wrestling. In El Dorado he was the leader of the faction Animal Planets. Owashi won the UWA World Trios Championship with Takuya Sugawara and Nobutaka Araya on February 27, 2008, defeating the Brahman Brothers and Go of the Hell Demons faction.

=== DDT Pro-Wrestling (2007–2010, 2012–present) ===
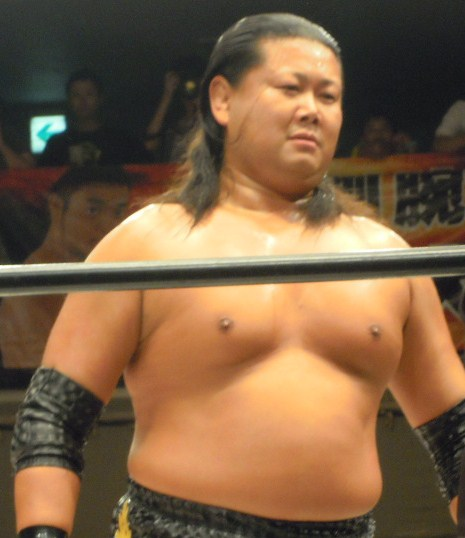
Owashi in September 2010

In 2007 he joined DDT Pro-Wrestling, where he won the KO-D Openweight Championship by beating Danshoku Dino. He defended the championship vs Poison Sawada Julie on June 25, 2006, and a second time vs Kudo on August 27, 2006, but Owashi lost the KO-D Openweight Championship to Harashima on December 29, 2006. Owashi would originally retire from professional wrestling in 2010, but came out of retirement in 2012 and returned to the promotion.

== Sumo career record ==
Asawashi Tōru
Year	January Hatsu basho, Tokyo	March Haru basho, Osaka	May Natsu basho, Tokyo	July Nagoya basho, Nagoya	September Aki basho, Tokyo	November Kyūshū basho, Fukuoka
1993	x	(Maezumo)	East Jonokuchi #30; 3–4	West Jonokuchi #28; 4–3	East Jonidan #180; 2–5	East Jonokuchi #22; 2–5
1994	East Jonokuchi #40; 5–2	West Jonidan #153; 2–5	West Jonidan #181; 3–4	East Jonokuchi #1; 3–4	East Jonokuchi #26; 6–1–P	East Jonidan #115; 1–6
1995	West Jonidan #152; 3–4	East Jonidan #172; 4–3	East Jonidan #139; 2–5	East Jonidan #169; 4–3	West Jonidan #138; 2–5	West Jonidan #166; Sat out due to injury 0–0–7
1996	East Jonokuchi #50; 5–2	East Jonidan #164; 5–2	West Jonidan #106; 1–6	West Jonidan #151; Sat out due to injury 0–0–7	West Jonokuchi #33; Sat out due to injury 0–0–7	(Banzukegai)
1997	(Maezumo)	West Jonokuchi #45; 5–2	West Jonidan #161; 4–3	West Jonidan #132; 4–3	West Jonidan #100; 3–4	West Jonidan #122; 4–3
1998	West Jonidan #95; 4–3	West Jonidan #67; 2–5	East Jonidan #101; 3–4	West Jonidan #119; Sat out due to injury 0–0–7	East Jonokuchi #28; 6–1	West Jonidan #89; 5–2
1999	West Jonidan #42; Retired; 2–5	x	x	x	x	x
Record given as wins–losses–absences Top division champion Top division runner-up Retired Lower divisions Non-participation Sanshō key: F=Fighting spirit; O=Outstanding performance; T=Technique Also shown: ★=Kinboshi; P=Playoff(s); Divisions: Makuuchi — Jūryō — Makushita — Sandanme — Jonidan — Jonokuchi Makuuchi ranks: Yokozuna — Ōzeki — Sekiwake — Komusubi — Maegashira

== Championships and accomplishments ==
- Best Body Japan Pro-Wrestling

- BBW 6-Man Tag Team Championship (1 time, current) – with Danshoku Dino and Gota Ihashi
- BBW Tag Team Championship (1 time) – (with Gota Ihashi)

- DDT Pro-Wrestling

- KO-D Openweight Championship (1 time)
- O-40 Championship (2 times)
- Ironman Heavymetalweight Championship (32 times - 1 with Hiroshi Yamato)
- Jiyūgaoka 6-Person Tag Team Championship (1 time) – with Durian Sawada Julie and Mango Fukuda
- KO-D 6-Man Tag Team Championship (5 times) – with Akebono and Sanshiro Takagi (1), Kazuki Hirata and Sanshiro Takagi (3), and Naruki Doi and Kazuki Hirata (1)
- KO-D 8-Man Tag Team Championship (1 time) – with Antonio Honda, Kazuki Hirata and Yoshihiko
- KO-D Tag Team Championship (2 times) – with Harashima and Darkside Hero
- UWA World Trios Championship (1 time) – with Harashima and Yukihiro Abe

- El Dorado Wrestling

- UWA World Trios Championship (1 time) – with Nobutaka Araya and Takuya Sugawara

- Pro-Wrestling Basara

- UWA World Trios Championship (1 time, current) – with Shuji Kondo and Takuya Sugawara

- Toryumon

- UWA World Trios Championship (1 time) – with Condotti Shuji and "brother" Yasshi
- Young Dragons Cup (2001)
