= Kazuki Hirata =

Japanese professional wrestler

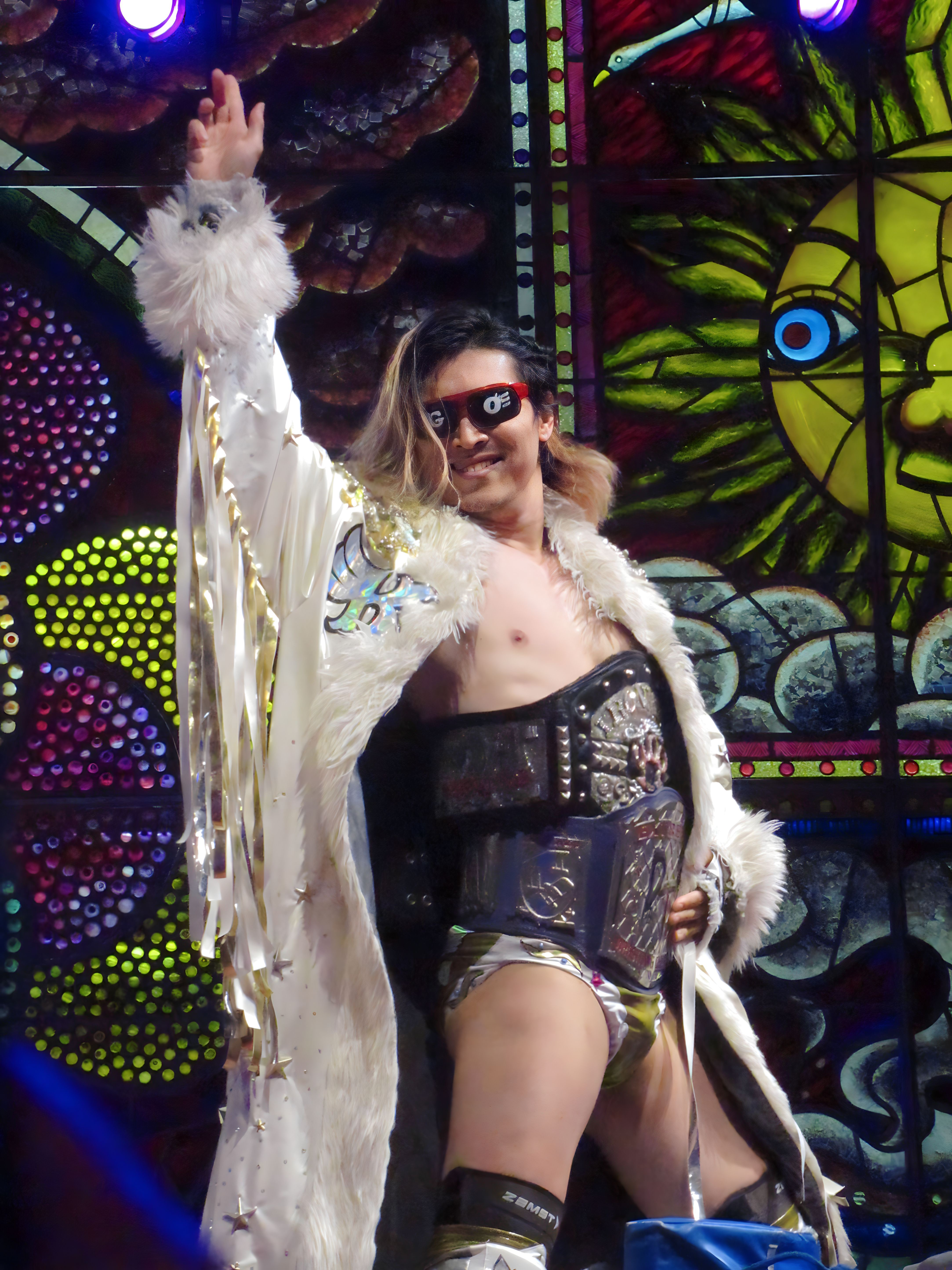
- Hirata in September 2023

Personal information
- Born: November 21, 1987 (age 38) Adachi, Tokyo, Japan

Professional wrestling career
- Ring name(s): Hirata Collection AT; Kazuko Hirata; Ichiko Irata; Hiratimo Dragon brother KAZUKI; Kazuki Hirata
- Billed height: 5 ft 8 in (173 cm)
- Billed weight: 172 lb (78 kg)
- Debut: 2010

Kazuki Hirata (平田一喜, Hirata Kazuki; born November 21, 1987) is a Japanese professional wrestler. He is signed to the Japanese professional wrestling promotion DDT Pro-Wrestling (DDT).

== Professional wrestling career ==
=== DDT Pro-Wrestling (2010–present) ===
Hirata's first known match as a professional wrestler was a loss against Keisuke Ishii for the Ironman Heavymetalweight Championship at Judgement 2010 on March 14, 2010, however, he is known to have previously defeated Michael Nakazawa at a promotion's house show on February 28, 2010 to win the title. He is known for his affiliation with various stables such as T2Hii in which he paired with Sanshiro Takagi and Toru Owashi to win the KO-D 6-Man Tag Team Championship at Dramatic General Election 2014 Final Voting Day - Last Hope Special on September 28, 2014 from Team Dream Futures (Keisuke Ishii, Shigehiro Irie and Soma Takao). The other stable he took part in is Disaster Box, and he teamed up with fellow stablemates Toru Owashi and Yuki Ueno to unsuccessfully challenge Damnation (Mad Paulie, Soma Takao and Tetsuya Endo at Ryōgoku Peter Pan on October 21 for the KO-D 6-Man Tag Team Championship. Hirata participated in a cross-over event held between DDT and Big Japan Pro Wrestling, the BJW/DDT Kumamoto Earthquake Reconstruction Assistance Charity Pro-Wrestling on July 2, 2016, where he teamed up with Speed Of Sounds (Hercules Senga and Tsutomu Oosugi) and with his T2Hii fellow stable member Sanshiro Takagi to defeat The Brahman Brothers (Brahman Kei, Brahman Shu), Danshoku Dino and Takayuki Ueki in an 8-man tag team match. The event helped raising charity money for the disaster caused by the Kumamoto Earthquake which hit Japan back in 2016. At Kawasaki Strong 2021 on February 14, Hirata teamed up with Shinya Aoki, Super Sasadango Machine and Antonio Honda to defeat Sanshiro Takagi, Danshoku Dino, Toru Owashi and Makoto Oishi for the KO-D 8-Man Tag Team Championship.

==== Right to Challenge Arm Cover and KO-D Openweight Championship ====
On August 9, 2025, Hirata defeated Danshoku Dieno and Super Sasadango Machine for one of four "Right to Challenge Anytime Anywhere" arm covers issued by DDT. All three wrestlers attempted to lose the match because they didn't want the responsibility of having to challenge for a title match, but ultimately Hirata accepted the prize.

On day two of Wrestle Peter Pan 2025 at Korakuen Hall, he successfully cashed in his "Right to Challenge" for a title match against Yuki Ueno, and became the new KO-D Openweight Champion. This spurred a crisis of identity, where he briefly considered changing his wrestling style to be more serious, but ultimately returned to his usual flamboyant dance style.

He successfully defended his title against a Right to Challenge armband cash in from Akito on September 15. After that, Hirata chose Yoshihiko as his opponent for his first formal defense of the championship. At Dramatic Infinity 2025, Hirata defeated Yoshihiko after an 15 minute and 42 second minute match with a series of power bombs followed by a Somersault Power Bomb. After the match, Yoshihiko presented Hirata with a gift of Haribo candy. However, inside the box under the candy was another "Right to Challenge" arm cover. Once this was revealed, Yoshihiko's masked puppeteer was revealed to be Yuki Ueno, who had appeared to demand a surprise title match. Ueno defeated Hirata with the WK and regained his championship.

=== New Japan Pro-Wrestling (2011) ===
Hirata has wrestled several matches for New Japan Pro-Wrestling. One of them was a singles match loss against Hiromu Takahashi at NEVER.5 on February 24, 2011 and the other two were also two losses, one against Madoka and a tag team match in which he teamed up with Shinichiro Tominaga against Hiromu Takahashi and Kyosuke Mikami, both of the matches being part of the NEVER.6: Road To The Super Junior 2 Days Tournament.

== Championships and accomplishments ==
- DDT Pro-Wrestling
  - KO-D Openweight Championship (1 time)
  - DDT Extreme Championship (1 time)
  - Ironman Heavymetalweight Championship (67 times, current)
  - KO-D 6-Man Tag Team Championship (5 times) – with Sanshiro Takagi and Toru Owashi (3), Akito and Shota (1), and Naruki Doi and Toru Owashi (1)
  - KO-D 8-Man Tag Team Championship (2 times) – with Shinya Aoki, Super Sasadango Machine and Antonio Honda (1), and Toru Owashi, Antonio Honda and Yoshihiko (1)
  - World Ōmori Championship (1 time, interim)
  - Twilight Rough Cup Battle Royal (2025)
- Pro Wrestling Illustrated
  - Ranked No. 214 of the top singles wrestlers in the PWI 500 in 2026
