= Judgement 2019: DDT 22nd Anniversary =

2019 DDT Pro-Wrestling event

- Promotional poster for the event, featuring various DDT wrestlers
- Promotion: DDT Pro-Wrestling
- Date: February 17, 2019
- City: Tokyo, Japan
- Venue: Ryōgoku Kokugikan
- Attendance: 4,177

Event chronology
← Previous; Peter Pan 2018	Next → Into The Fight 2019

Judgement chronology
← Previous; 2018	Next → 2020

Judgement 2019: DDT 22nd Anniversary (Judgement2019〜DDT旗揚げ22周年記念大会〜, Judgement 2019: hataage 22 shūnen kinen taikai) was a professional wrestling event promoted by DDT Pro-Wrestling (DDT). It took place on February 17, 2019, in Tokyo, Japan, at the Ryōgoku Kokugikan. It was the twenty-third event under the Judgement name. The event aired domestically on Fighting TV Samurai and globally on DDT's video-on-demand service DDT Universe.

== Storylines ==
Judgement 2019 featured twelve professional wrestling matches that involved different wrestlers from pre-existing scripted feuds and storylines. Wrestlers portrayed villains, heroes, or less distinguishable characters in the scripted events that built tension and culminated in a wrestling match or series of matches.

By winning the D-Oh Grand Prix 2019 tournament on December 30, 2018, Konosuke Takeshita earned a KO-D Openweight Championship match in the main event against Daisuke Sasaki.

== Event ==
On the undercard, the first two matches were presented respectively by Basara and Tokyo Joshi Pro Wrestling, two DDT sub-brands.

Next, on the main card, was the return match of Shunma Katsumata.

Newt was a Rumble rules match for the Ironman Heavymetalweight Championship. During the match, Kazuki Hirata pinned Asuka to win the title before being pinned by Saki Akai who won the match and became the 1,350th champion.

Next was a match dubbed "Taihō Kōki’s Grandson Yukio Naya Ryōgoku Kokugikan First Appearance!" that saw the participation of Go Shiozaki from Pro Wrestling Noah and Daisuke Sekimoto from Big Japan Pro Wrestling. As its name implies, this was the first Ryōgoku Kokugikan match for Yukio Naya, grandson of Taihō Kōki, the 48th yokozuna in the Japanese sport of sumo wrestling.

The seventh match was dubbed "Danshoku Dino Produces Yuru-chara “Pokotan” Debut Match" and saw the first appearance of a yuru-chara named Pokotan (played by Makoto Oishi).

Next was a hardcore match involving Takumi Iroha and Chigusa Nagayo from Marvelous That's Women Pro Wrestling as well as Ryuji Ito from Big Japan Pro Wrestling.

Next was a KO-D Tag Team Championship match that saw the participation of Seiki Yoshioka from Wrestle-1 who teamed with his #StrongHearts stable partner Cima.

== Results ==
No.	Results	Stipulations	Times
1^{P}	Sento Minzoku (Ryuichi Sekine and Daiki Shimomura) defeated Aijin Tag (Takato Nakano and Masato Kamino) by submission	Tag team match	06:14
2^{P}	Bakuretsu Sisters (Nodoka Tenma and Yuki Aino) and Yuna Manase defeated Natsupoi, Hikari Noa and Miu Watanabe	Six-woman tag team match	11:49
3	All Out (Shunma Katsumata and Space Monkey) and Yuki Ueno defeated Antonio Honda, Jason Kincaid and Naomi Yoshimura	Six-man tag team match	12:55
4	Saki Akai won by last eliminating Kazuki Hirata	Rumble rules match for the Ironman Heavymetalweight Championship	20:23
5	Go Shiozaki, Kazusada Higuchi and Yukio Naya defeated Daisuke Sekimoto, Toru Owashi and Yuki Iino	Six-man tag team match	13:09
6	T-Hawk defeated Akito	Singles match	13:50
7	Keisuke Ishii, Kota Umeda and Mizuki Watase defeated Danshoku Dino, Pokotan and Kudo	Six-man tag team match	11:28
8	Damnation (Soma Takao and Mad Paulie) and Takumi Iroha defeated Sanshiro Takagi, Chigusa Nagayo and Ryuji Ito	Hardcore six-person tag team match	19:54
9	Moonlight Express (Mike Bailey and Mao) (c) defeated Shuten-dōji (Yukio Sakaguchi and Masahiro Takanashi) and #StrongHearts (Cima and Seiki Yoshioka)	Three-way tag team match for the KO-D Tag Team Championship	13:06
10	Harashima defeated Shinya Aoki (c)	Singles match for the DDT Extreme Championship	12:11
11	Naomichi Marufuji defeated Tetsuya Endo	Singles match	18:08
12	Konosuke Takeshita defeated Daisuke Sasaki (c)	Singles match for the KO-D Openweight Championship	32:08
(c) / – the champion(s) heading into the match; P / – the match was broadcast on the pre-show

=== Rumble rules match ===
Order	Name	Order eliminated	By	Time
1	Super Sasadango Machine	4	Makoto Oishi	04:25
2	Yuni	1	Makoto Oishi	02:14
3	Hoshitango	5	El Lindaman	05:18
4	Gota Ihashi	2	Hoshitango	03:28
5	Tomomitsu Matsunaga	3	Hoshitango	03:28
6	Kazuki Hirata	17	Saki Akai (Note: Akai becomes the 1,350th champion.)	20:23
7	Makoto Oishi	8	Maku Donaruto	10:17
8	Scorpio X2	6	Himself (Note: Scorpio went over the top rope by hitting a Sasuke Special on Hoshitango who was outside the ring, thus eliminating himself.)	05:25
9	El Lindaman	12	Chinsuke Nakamura	14:51
10	Keisuke Okuda	7	Makoto Oishi	06:40
11	Saki Akai	—	—	Winner
12	Yasu Urano	13	Asuka	15:39
13	Mina Shirakawa	11	Yuka Sakazaki	12:52
14	Maku Donaruto	9	Yasu Urano	12:00
15	Gorgeous Matsuno	10	Yasu Urano	12:00
16	Yuka Sakazaki	15	Saki Akai	19:03
17	Chinsuke Nakamura	14	Asuka	18:42
18	Asuka (c)	16	Kazuki Hirata (Note: Hirata becomes the 1,349th champion.)	19:30
