= Ryōgoku Peter Pan 2018 =

2018 DDT Pro-Wrestling event

- Promotional poster for the event featuring various wrestlers
- Promotion: DDT Pro-Wrestling
- Date: October 21, 2018
- City: Tokyo, Japan
- Venue: Ryōgoku Kokugikan
- Attendance: 6,259
- Tagline: Fall Pro-Wrestling Cultural Festival

Pay-per-view chronology
| ← Previous; Judgment 2018 | Next → Judgment 2019 |

Peter Pan chronology
| ← Previous; 2017 | Next → 2019 |

Ryōgoku Peter Pan 2018: Autumn Pro-Wrestling Cultural Festival (両国ピーターパン2018〜秋のプロレス文化祭〜, Ryōgoku Pītā Pan 2018: Aki no Puroresu Bunkasai) was a professional wrestling event promoted by DDT Pro-Wrestling (DDT). The event took place on October 21, 2018, in Tokyo at the Ryōgoku Kokugikan. The event, named after the traditional Japanese cultural festivals, featured twelve matches, two of which were contested for championships. The event aired on Fighting TV Samurai and was the first Peter Pan event to be held in the fall.

== Storylines ==
The Ryōgoku Peter Pan 2018 event featured twelve professional wrestling matches that involved different wrestlers from pre-existing scripted feuds and storylines. Wrestlers portrayed villains, heroes, or less distinguishable characters in the scripted events that built tension and culminated in a wrestling match or series of matches.

By winning the King of DDT tournament on August 26, Daisuke Sasaki earned a title match in the main event against KO-D Openweight Champion Danshoku Dino.

== Event ==
First on the undercard was a ten-man Rumble rules match. Amongst the participants was a fake Tiger Mask V.

The second match of the undercard was Mina Shirakawa's first DDT match and featured six Tokyo Joshi Pro Wrestling talents.

On the main card, Disaster Box (Toru Owashi, Kazuki Hirata and Yuki Ueno) challenged Damnation (Soma Takao, Tetsuya Endo and Mad Paulie) for the KO-D 6-Man Tag Team Championship.

Next was a six-team Gauntlet match in which two tag teams begin the match and are replaced whenever one is eliminated (by pinfall or submission) until there is only one team left.

Next was a tag team match dubbed "Super Joshi Pro Wars 2018" pitting Cassandra Miyagi and Meiko Satomura from Sendai Girls' Pro Wrestling against the team of Maki Itoh and Saki Akai.

Next was a six-man tag team match between All Out (Akito, Shunma Katsumata and Yuki Iino) and #StrongHearts (T-Hawk, El Lindaman and Duan Yingnan).

Next was an intergender tag team match between real life husband and wife Joey Ryan and Laura James, and real life fiancés Makoto Oishi and Misaki Ohata from Pro Wrestling Wave. The match was dubbed "The World's Crazy Couple Battle".

Next was a match sponsored by Souken Holdings dubbed "Eat Or Be Eaten!? Giant Special Single Match" between Super Sasadango Machine and Andreza Giant Panda, a gigantic panda mascot.

Next was a Weapon Rumble match dubbed "The Difference In 27 Years Of Age! Bloodbath Between President (48) and Roster Member (21) — Final and Conclusive Weapon Rumble" in which various weapons secretly chosen by the participants beforehand were being introduced one after another at regular intervals.

Next was Shigehiro Irie send-off match. He teamed up with his Team Dream Futures partner Keisuke Ishii to take on the team of Harashima and Yukio Sakaguchi.

Next, Konosuke Takeshita faced off against Cima.

In the main event, Daisuke Sasaki challenged Danshoku Dino for the KO-D Openweight Championship. Sasaki won the bout and was granted a 2,000,000 yen prize by Good Com Asset, the sponsor of the match.

== Results ==
| No. | Results | Stipulations | Times |
|---|---|---|---|
| 1^{P} | Nobuhiro Shimatani won by last eliminating Gorgeous Matsuno | Rumble rules match | 13:26 |
| 2^{P} | Yuka Sakazaki, Mizuki and Shoko Nakajima defeated Miyu Yamashita, Yuki Kamifuku and Mina Shirakawa | Six-woman tag team match | 9:08 |
| 3 | Damnation (Soma Takao, Tetsuya Endo and Mad Paulie) (c) defeated Disaster Box (Toru Owashi, Kazuki Hirata and Yuki Ueno) | Six-man tag team match for the KO-D 6-Man Tag Team Championship | 11:21 |
| 4 | Shuten-dōji (Kudo and Masahiro Takanashi) defeated Mike Bailey and Antonio Honda, Renegades (Mizuki Watase and Jason "The Gift" Kincaid), Kazusada Higuchi and Kota Umeda, Thanomsak Toba and Keisuke Okuda, and Tomomitsu Matsunaga and Michael Nakazawa | Gauntlet tag team match | 18:52 |
| 5 | Meiko Satomura and Cassandra Miyagi defeated Saki Akai and Maki Itoh by submission | Tag team match | 11:07 |
| 6 | #StrongHearts (T-Hawk, El Lindaman and Duan Yingnan) defeated All Out (Akito, Shunma Katsumata and Yuki Iino) | Six-man tag team match | 11:20 |
| 7 | Makoto Oishi and Misaki Ohata defeated Joey Ryan and Laura James | Tag team match | 6:45 |
| 8 | Andreza Giant Panda defeated Super Sasadango Machine | Singles match | 10:25 |
| 9 | Mao defeated Sanshiro Takagi | Weapon Rumble | 24:05 |
| 10 | Team Dream Futures (Shigehiro Irie and Keisuke Ishii) defeated Harashima and Yukio Sakaguchi | Tag team match | 14:50 |
| 11 | Cima defeated Konosuke Takeshita | Singles match | 24:21 |
| 12 | Daisuke Sasaki defeated Danshoku Dino (c) by submission | Singles match for the KO-D Openweight Championship | 32:10 |
(c) / – the champion(s) heading into the match; P / – the match was broadcast on the pre-show

=== Rumble rules match ===
| Order | Wrestler | Order eliminated | By | Time |
|---|---|---|---|---|
| 1 | Nobuhiro Shimatani | — | — | Winner |
| 2 | Yumehito Imanari | 6 | Gorgeous Matsuno | 10:59 |
| 3 | Shota | 7 | Gorgeous Matsuno | 10:59 |
| 4 | Tiger Mask V (self-proclaimed) | 1 | Everyone | 6:43 |
| 5 | Michael Wolf | 3 | Hoshitango | 8:34 |
| 6 | Gundan Hitori | 2 | Hoshitango | 8:01 |
| 7 | Monster Halloween | 4 | Gorgeous Matsuno | 9:24 |
| 8 | Gota Ihashi | 8 | Nobuhiro Shimatani | 11:06 |
| 9 | Hoshitango | 5 | Gota Ihashi, Yumehito Imanari and Shota | 10:04 |
| 10 | Gorgeous Matsuno | 9 | Nobuhiro Shimatani | 13:26 |

=== Gauntlet tag team match ===
| Elimination | Wrestler | Team | Eliminated by | Elimination move | Time | Ref. |
|---|---|---|---|---|---|---|
| 1 | Mizuki Watase | Renegades | Mike Bailey | Pinned after an Ultima Weapon | 5:09 | |
| 2 | Antonio Honda | Mike Bailey and Antonio Honda | Keisuke Okuda | Cross armbreaker | 8:28 | |
| 3 | Thanomsak Toba | Thanomsak Toba and Keisuke Okuda | Michael Nakazawa | Pinned with a Japanese leg roll clutch | 10:49 | |
| 4 | Michael Nakazawa | Tomomitsu Matsunaga and Michael Nakazawa | Kudo | Pinned after a Diving double knee drop | 12:46 | |
| 5 | Kota Umeda | Kazusada Higuchi and Kota Umeda | Masahiro Takanashi | Pinned after a Taka Tonic | 18:52 | |
| Winners: | Shuten-dōji (Kudo and Masahiro Takanashi) | | | | | |
