= Into The Fight 2019 =

2019 DDT Pro-Wrestling event

- Promotional poster featuring various wrestlers
- Promotion: DDT Pro-Wrestling
- Date: March 21, 2019
- City: Tokyo, Japan
- Venue: Korakuen Hall
- Attendance: 1,433

Event chronology
← Previous; Judgment 2019	Next → Peter Pan 2019

Into The Fight chronology
← Previous; 2018	Next → 2020

Into The Fight 2019 was a professional wrestling event promoted by DDT Pro-Wrestling (DDT). It took place on March 21, 2019, in Tokyo, Japan, at the Korakuen Hall. The event aired domestically on Fighting TV Samurai and AbemaTV, and globally on DDT Universe, DDT's video-on-demand service.

Ten matches were contested at the event, including one on the pre-show. In the main event, Harashima defeated Muscle Sakai by two falls to one in a two-out-of-three falls hardcore match to retain the DDT Extreme Division Championship.

== Storylines ==
Into The Fight 2019 featured ten professional wrestling matches involving wrestlers from pre-existing scripted feuds and storylines. Wrestlers portrayed villains, heroes, or less distinguishable characters in the scripted events that built tension and culminated in a wrestling match or series of matches.

== Event ==
During the event, Michael Nakazawa had his final match before going to All Elite Wrestling. Originally, the match was supposed to be a five-on-one handicap match in which Nakazawa would face the team of Sanshiro Takagi, Masahiro Takanashi, Tomomitsu Matsunaga, Keisuke Okuda and Hiroshi Yamato. However, during the match, Yamato hit Nakazawa with a "Sliding X" and pinned him for the win in only 18 seconds. Nakazawa was granted a rematch which he lost when Okuda submitted him with a cross armbreaker in 25 seconds. Eventually, all the participants agreed to change the match to a regular six-man tag team match that Nakazawa's team won.

The event also saw the two main multi-competitor titles change hands; Sendai Girls' Pro Wrestling (Meiko Satomura, Dash Chisako and Chihiro Hashimoto) won the KO-D 6-Man Tag Team Championship from All Out (Konosuke Takeshita, Akito and Yuki Iino), and Damnation (Daisuke Sasaki and Soma Takao) captured the KO-D Tag Team Championship from Moonlight Express (Mike Bailey and Mao).

The main event was a two-out-of-three falls match between Harashima and Muscle Sakai where each fall was competed under different rules. In the first fall, the competitors were playing a game of Daruma-san ga Koronda while wrestling. Whenever the phrase "Daruma-san ga Koronda!" (だるまさんが転んだ!; lit. "The Daruma Fell Over!") was shouted into the microphone, both wrestlers had to freeze. Failing to do so would result in a strike and the first one to get three strikes would be disqualified. Muscle Sakai won the first fall when Harashima got his third strike. In the second fall, both wrestlers had to constantly have a conversation with another person on their phones. Interrupting the call for three seconds would result in a disqualification. Harashima won the fall when Sakai's phone got knocked out of his hands and he failed to retrieve it in time. The final fall could only be won by getting pinned by the opponent for a three-count. Harashima won the fall when he kicked Sakai in the head and Sakai fell on top of him for the unintentional pin. As a result, Harashima retained the DDT Extreme Division Championship.

== Results ==
No.	Results	Stipulations	Times
1^{P}	Shunma Katsumata defeated Mizuki Watase	Singles match	05:42
2	Bull James, Kota Umeda and Naomi Yoshimura defeated Damnation (Tetsuya Endo, Mad Paulie and Nobuhiro Shimatani)	Six-man tag team match	14:49
3	Sanshiro Takagi, Masahiro Takanashi, Tomomitsu Matsunaga, Keisuke Okuda and Hiroshi Yamato defeated Michael Nakazawa	Five-on-one handicap match	00:18
4	Sanshiro Takagi, Masahiro Takanashi, Tomomitsu Matsunaga, Keisuke Okuda and Hiroshi Yamato defeated Michael Nakazawa by submission	Five-on-one handicap match	00:25
5	Nuru Nuru Brothers (Michael Nakazawa and Tomomitsu Matsunaga) and Masahiro Takanashi defeated Sanshiro Takagi, Keisuke Okuda and Hiroshi Yamato	Six-man tag team match	08:50
6	Makoto Oishi, Antonio Honda and Asuka (with Furitsuke Kamen) defeated Disaster Box (Toru Owashi and Kazuki Hirata) and Saki Akai	Six-person tag team match	08:27
7	Riki Choshu, Kazusada Higuchi and Yuki Ueno defeated Shuten-dōji (Kudo and Yukio Sakaguchi) and Gota Ihashi	Six-man tag team match	09:26
8	Sendai Girls' Pro Wrestling (Meiko Satomura, Dash Chisako and Chihiro Hashimoto) defeated All Out (Konosuke Takeshita, Akito and Yuki Iino) (c)	Six-person tag team match for the KO-D 6-Man Tag Team Championship	15:34
9	Damnation (Daisuke Sasaki and Soma Takao) defeated Moonlight Express (Mike Bailey and Mao) (c)	Tag team match for the KO-D Tag Team Championship	14:52
10	Harashima (c) defeated Muscle Sakai (2–1)	Two-out-of-three falls hardcore match for the DDT Extreme Division Championship	13:35
(c) / – the champion(s) heading into the match; P / – the match was broadcast on the pre-show
