= Judgement 2018: DDT 21st Anniversary =

2018 DDT Pro-Wrestling event

- Promotional poster for the event, featuring various DDT wrestlers
- Promotion: DDT Pro-Wrestling
- Date: March 25, 2018
- City: Tokyo, Japan
- Venue: Ryōgoku Kokugikan
- Attendance: 5,796

Event chronology
← Previous; Into The Fight 2018	Next → Peter Pan 2018

Judgement chronology
← Previous; 2017	Next → 2019

Judgement 2018: DDT 21st Anniversary (Judgement2018〜DDT旗揚げ21周年記念大会〜, Judgement 2018: hataage 21 shūnen kinen taikai) was a professional wrestling event promoted by DDT Pro-Wrestling (DDT). It took place on March 25, 2018, in Tokyo, Japan, at the Ryōgoku Kokugikan. It was the twenty-second event under the Judgement name. The event aired domestically on Fighting TV Samurai and globally on DDT's video-on-demand service DDT Universe.

== Storylines ==
Judgement 2018 featured twelve professional wrestling matches that involved different wrestlers from pre-existing scripted feuds and storylines. Wrestlers portrayed villains, heroes, or less distinguishable characters in the scripted events that built tension and culminated in a wrestling match or series of matches.

By winning the D-Oh Grand Prix 2018 tournament on January 28, Shuji Ishikawa earned a KO-D Openweight Championship match in the main event against Konosuke Takeshita.

== Event ==
The third match on the undercard was presented by Tokyo Joshi Pro Wrestling, a sub-brand of DDT.

Next, the gauntlet match saw the participation of Deadlift Lolita (Ladybeard and Reika Saiki) and LiLiCo, a TV personality.

The next match was a singles match between Colt Cabana (billed as Colt "Boom Boom" Cabana) and Joey Ryan dubbed "World Crazy Wrestler No. 1 Decision Battle In DDT".

Next was a second match presented by Tokyo Joshi Pro Wrestling, featuring Yoshiko from SEAdLINNNG.

Next, Super Sasadango Machine defended the Ironman Heavymetalweight Championship against Jiro "Ikemen" Kuroshio from Wrestle-1.

The five-way tag team match was a "Losers Get Anal Blast Weapon Rumble" in which various weapons secretly chosen by the participants beforehand were being introduced one after an other at regular intervals.

Next was a six-man tag team match that saw the participation of the Great Muta from Wrestle-1.

== Results ==
No.	Results	Stipulations	Times
1^{P}	Tomomitsu Matsunaga, Hoshitango, Mad Paulie, Cherry and Gota Ihashi defeated Mizuki Watase, Rekka, Gran MilliMeters (Daiki Shimomura and Nobuhiro Shimatani) and Takato Nakano	Ten-person tag team match	07:26
2^{P}	Kenshin Chikano and Joe Akira defeated Kouki Iwasaki and Shin'ichiro Tominaga	Tag team match	08:14
3^{P}	MiraClians (Yuka Sakazaki and Shoko Nakajima) defeated Dragon Bombers (Rika Tatsumi and Maho Kurone)	Tag team match	08:45
4	T2Hii (Toru Owashi and Kazuki Hirata) defeated All Out (Akito and Shunma Katsumata), Antonio Honda and Ethan Page, Naomi Kingdom (Naomi Yoshimura and Keisuke Okuda), Deadlift Lolita (Reika Saiki and Ladybeard) and LiLiCo and Makoto Oishi	Gauntlet tag team match	14:51
5	Colt "Boom Boom" Cabana defeated Joey Ryan	Singles match	10:12
6	NEO Biishiki-gun (Saki-sama, Yoshiko and Azusa Christie) defeated Miyu Yamashita, Maki Itoh and Mizuki	Six-woman tag team match	11:53
7	Super Sasadango Machine (c) defeated Jiro "Ikemen" Kuroshio	Singles match for the Ironman Heavymetalweight Championship	09:12
8	Koju Takeda, Kota Umeda and Yuki Ueno defeated Shuten-dōji (Kudo, Masahiro Takanashi and Yukio Sakaguchi) (c)	Six-man tag team match for the KO-D 6-Man Tag Team Championship	12:28
9	Moonlight Express (Mike Bailey and Mao) defeated Michael Nakazawa and Chinsuke Nakamura, Isami Kodaka and Fuminori Abe, Sanshiro Takagi and Ordinary Man Munenori Sawa, and Smile Squash (Yuko Miyamoto and Soma Takao)	Losers Get Anal Blast Weapon Rumble five-way tag team match	17:43
10	The Great Muta and Damnation (Daisuke Sasaki and Tetsuya Endo) defeated Danshoku Dino, Keisuke Ishii and Ken Ohka	Six-man tag team match	20:09
11	SekiGuchi (Daisuke Sekimoto and Kazusada Higuchi) defeated HarashiMarufuji (Harashima and Naomichi Marufuji) (c)	Tag team match for the KO-D Tag Team Championship	17:49
12	Konosuke Takeshita (c) defeated Shuji Ishikawa	Singles match for the KO-D Openweight Championship	23:31
(c) / – the champion(s) heading into the match; P / – the match was broadcast on the pre-show

=== Gauntlet match ===
Elimination	Wrestler	Team	Eliminated by	Elimination move	Time	Ref.
1	Ladybeard	Deadlift Lolita	Antonio Honda	Over the top rope	03:26	
2	Naomi Yoshimura	Naomi Kingdom	Ethan Page	Over the top rope	08:27	
3	Antonio Honda	Antonio Honda and Ethan Page	Shunma Katsumata	Pinfall	09:27	
4	Shunma Katsumata	All Out	Kazuki Hirata	Pinfall	11:31	
5	LiLiCo	LiLiCo and Makoto Oishi	Kazuki Hirata	Pinfall	14:51	
Winners:	T2Hii (Toru Owashi and Kazuki Hirata)					
