= Wrestle Peter Pan 2019 =

2019 DDT Pro-Wrestling event

- Promotional poster for the event featuring various wrestlers
- Promotion: DDT Pro-Wrestling
- Date: July 15, 2019
- City: Tokyo, Japan
- Venue: Ota City General Gymnasium
- Attendance: 3,798

Pay-per-view chronology
| ← Previous; Into The Fight 2019 | Next → Ultimate Party 2019 |

Peter Pan chronology
| ← Previous; 2018 | Next → 2020 |

Wrestle Peter Pan 2019 was a Japanese professional wrestling event promoted by DDT Pro-Wrestling (DDT). The event took place on July 15, 2019, in Tokyo at the Ota City General Gymnasium. The event featured thirteen matches, five of which were contested for championships. The event aired on Fighting TV Samurai and on DDT's video on demand service DDT Universe. This was the first Peter Pan event to have its name written in rōmaji.

== Storylines ==
The Wrestle Peter Pan 2019 event featured thirteen professional wrestling matches that involved different wrestlers from pre-existing scripted feuds and storylines. Wrestlers portrayed villains, heroes, or less distinguishable characters in the scripted events that built tension and culminated in a wrestling match or series of matches.

By winning the King of DDT tournament on May 19, Konosuke Takeshita earned a title match in the main event against KO-D Openweight Champion Tetsuya Endo.

== Event ==
First on the undercard was an exhibition match presented by Hotel Cent Inn Kurashiki between trainee Keigo Nakamura and Kota Umeda.

Next was a six-woman tag team match presented by JPA, an accounting management company, featuring Tokyo Joshi Pro Wrestling talents.

On the main card, Saki Akai faced Yoshiko from SEAdLINNNG.

Next, Akito defended the DDT Extreme Championship against Asuka in an Ippon Fluorescent Light Tube Deathmatch in which a single light tube was used. Per the rules, whoever would break the tube would be declared the loser of the match.

Before the next match, a backstage segment was shown in which Toru Owashi, the then Ironman Heavymetalweight Champion, broke up an argument between Gorgeous Matsuno and masked wrestler Furitsuke Kamen. Matsuno and Furitsuke began fighting until Furitsuke was unmasked, revealing that he was actually Lucky Ikeda, a well-known tarento. In the confusion, Ikeda pinned Owashi to become the 1,375th champion.

During the Rumble rules match, the title went from Ikeda to Matsuno to Tomomitsu Matsunaga to Mad Paulie and then to Kazuki Hirata before Hirata was eventually eliminated by Yukio Sakaguchi. Michiaki Nakano from Souken Holdings, a sponsor of the match, presented Sakaguchi with the match prize then tried to pin him but Sakaguchi stopped him.

Next was a match dubbed "2nd Generation Human Windmill vs. 3rd Generation Taihō" between Hideki Suzuki (whose nickname is "The 2nd Generation Human Windmill") and Yukio Naya (the grandson of Taihō Kōki, the 48th yokozuna in the sport of sumo wrestling).

Sanshiro Takagi faced Super Sasadango Machine in a Weapon Rumble match in which various weapons secretly chosen by the participants beforehand were being introduced one after another at regular intervals. This was a title match for the inaugural O-40 Championship, a title reserved for wrestlers over 40 years old.

Next, mixed martial artist Shinya Aoki faced Danshoku Dino in a match with special rules. The match was limited to ten rounds lasting three minutes each, every odd numbered round would be fought under strict fighting rules with no pins allowed and every even numbered round would be fought under regular professional wrestling rules with "courtship" allowed. Mina Shirakawa was the ring girl for the odd numbered rounds and Yuki Iino was the "ring boy" for the even numbered rounds.

Next, Damnation (Daisuke Sasaki and Soma Takao) defended the KO-D Tag Team Championship against the team of Harashima and Yasu Urano in a match sponsored by Souken Holdings.

In the main event, Konosuke Takeshita challenged Tetsuya Endo for the KO-D Openweight Championship. Takeshita won the bout and was granted a 2,000,000 yen prize and one year of Blackout products by Casting Dot JP Co., Ltd., the sponsor of the match.

== Results ==
| No. | Results | Stipulations | Times |
|---|---|---|---|
| 1^{P} | Kota Umeda defeated Keigo Nakamura | Singles match | 5:07 |
| 2^{P} | Rika Tatsumi and The Bakuretsu Sisters (Nodoka Tenma and Yuki Aino) defeated Natsumi Maki, Yuna Manase and Himawari Unagi | Six-woman tag team match | 10:35 |
| 3 | All Out (Shunma Katsumata and Yuki Iino) and Mizuki Watase defeated Disaster Box (Yuki Ueno and Naomi Yoshimura) and Nobuhiro Shimatani | Six-man tag team match | 12:11 |
| 4 | Kazusada Higuchi and Ryota Nakatsu defeated Kota Umeda and Kouki Iwasaki | Tag team match | 13:26 |
| 5 | Yoshiko defeated Saki Akai | Singles match | 8:32 |
| 6 | Akito (c) defeated Asuka by ippon (Note: In this context, a light tube breakage.) | Ippon Fluorescent Light Tube Deathmatch for the DDT Extreme Championship | 11:48 |
| 7 | Yukio Sakaguchi won by last eliminating Kazuki Hirata | Rumble rules match for the Ironman Heavymetalweight Championship | 20:04 |
| 8 | Hideki Suzuki defeated Yukio Naya | Singles match | 7:59 |
| 9 | Chris Brookes and Masahiro Takanashi defeated Moonlight Express (Mao and Mike Bailey) | Tag team match | 11:24 |
| 10 | Sanshiro Takagi defeated Super Sasadango Machine | Weapon Rumble for the inaugural O-40 Championship | 28:56 |
| 11 | Shinya Aoki defeated Danshoku Dino by technical submission | Special rules match | 4R 2:54 |
| 12 | Damnation (Daisuke Sasaki and Soma Takao) (c) defeated UraShima (Harashima and Yasu Urano) | Tag team match for the KO-D Tag Team Championship | 24:21 |
| 13 | Konosuke Takeshita defeated Tetsuya Endo (c) by submission | Singles match for the KO-D Openweight Championship | 31:38 |
(c) / – the champion(s) heading into the match; P / – the match was broadcast on the pre-show

=== Rumble rules match ===
| Order | Wrestler | Order eliminated | By | Time |
|---|---|---|---|---|
| 1 | Lucky Ikeda (c) | 1 | Gorgeous Matsuno (Note: Matsuno becomes the 1,376th champion.) | 3:37 |
| 2 | Gorgeous Matsuno | 2 | Tomomitsu Matsunaga (Note: Matsunaga becomes the 1,377th champion.) | 3:48 |
| 3 | Tomomitsu Matsunaga | 3 | Mad Paulie (Note: Paulie becomes the 1,378th champion.) | 5:40 |
| 4 | Pokotan | 7 | Shiro Koshinaka | 14:09 |
| 5 | Makoto Oishi | 8 | Shiro Koshinaka | 18:34 |
| 6 | Kazuki Hirata | 14 | Yukio Sakaguchi | 20:04 |
| 7 | Mad Paulie | 4 | Kazuki Hirata (Note: Hirata becomes the 1,379th champion.) | 7:49 |
| 8 | Yuki Kamifuku | 6 | Joey Ryan | 11:43 |
| 9 | Kuro-chan | 5 | Yuki Kamifuku | 11:30 |
| 10 | Yukio Sakaguchi | — | — | Winner |
| 11 | Joey Ryan | 9 | Shiro Koshinaka | 18:34 |
| 12 | Hiroshi Yamato | 10 | Shiro Koshinaka | 18:34 |
| 13 | Toru Owashi | 13 | Kazuki Hirata | 19:08 |
| 14 | Shiro Koshinaka | 12 | Kazuki Hirata | 19:08 |
| 15 | Antonio Honda | 11 | Kazuki Hirata | 19:08 |
