= Young Drama Cup =

DDT Pro-Wrestling event series

- Promotion: DDT Pro-Wrestling
- First event: Young Drama Cup 2009

The Young Drama Cup (ヤングドラマ杯, Yangu Dorama-hai) was a professional wrestling round-robin tournament held by DDT Pro-Wrestling to promote their younger talents. Only two editions were held, in 2009 and 2010.

The tournament was held under a points system, with 2 points for a win, 1 for a draw, and 0 for a loss. Contestants fought in a single block with the top two scoring contestants advancing to a final match.

The 2009 edition was won by Keisuke Ishii, and the 2010 edition was won by Soma Takao.

== Tournament finals ==
#	Event	Date	Venue	Location	Attendance	Final	Ref.
1	Welcome to the Never Land 2009	October 25, 2009	Korakuen Hall	Tokyo, Japan	1,346	Keisuke Ishii vs. Sasaki & Gabbana	
2	God Bless DDT 2010	November 28, 2010	Korakuen Hall	Tokyo, Japan	1,525	Soma Takao vs. Keisuke Ishii	

== Tournaments ==
Year	Winner	Times won	Participants
2009	Keisuke Ishii	1	6
2010	Soma Takao	1	6

== Results ==
=== 2009 ===
The first Young Drama Cup ran from September 13 to October 25, 2009.

Final standings
Sasaki & Gabbana	8
Keisuke Ishii	7
Yukihiro Abe	7
Tomokazu Taniguchi	4
Soma Takao	2
Gota Ihashi	2

Results	Abe	Ishii	Taniguchi	Ihashi	Takao	Sasaki
Abe	—N/a	Draw (15:00)	Abe (7:52)	Ihashi (3:05)	Abe (4:32)	Abe (7:50)
Ishii	Draw (15:00)	—N/a	Ishii (6:11)	Ishii (3:57)	Ishii (7:31)	Sasaki (8:03)
Taniguchi	Abe (7:52)	Ishii (6:11)	—N/a	Taniguchi (4:05)	Taniguchi (6:39)	Sasaki (8:16)
Ihashi	Ihashi (3:05)	Ishii (3:57)	Taniguchi (4:05)	—N/a	Takao (7:16)	Sasaki (9:40)
Takao	Abe (4:32)	Ishii (7:31)	Taniguchi (6:39)	Takao (7:16)	—N/a	Sasaki (5:23)
Sasaki	Abe (7:50)	Sasaki (8:03)	Sasaki (8:16)	Sasaki (9:40)	Sasaki (5:23)	—N/a

Tie-breaker		Finals
		Sasaki & Gabbana	13:24
		Keisuke Ishii	Pin
Yukihiro Abe	1:54	Keisuke Ishii	Pin
Keisuke Ishii	Pin

=== 2010 ===
The second edition of the Young Drama Cup ran from October 14 to November 28, 2010.

Final standings
Soma Takao	8
Keisuke Ishii	7
Shigehiro Irie	6
Yukihiro Abe	5
Rion Mizuki	2
Kazuki Hirata	2

Results	Abe	Ishii	Irie	Mizuki	Takao	Hirata
Abe	—N/a	Draw (15:00)	Abe (6:30)	Abe (5:47)	Takao (13:34)	Hirata (6:06)
Ishii	Draw (15:00)	—N/a	Ishii (5:13)	Ishii (6:10)	Takao (9:12)	Ishii (10:14)
Irie	Abe (6:30)	Ishii (5:13)	—N/a	Irie (6:03)	Irie (8:42)	Irie (5:22)
Mizuki	Abe (5:47)	Ishii (6:10)	Irie (6:03)	—N/a	Takao (2:22)	Mizuki (4:46)
Takao	Takao (13:34)	Takao (9:12)	Irie (8:42)	Takao (2:22)	—N/a	Takao (9:30)
Hirata	Hirata (6:06)	Ishii (10:14)	Irie (5:22)	Mizuki (4:46)	Takao (9:30)	—N/a

Finals
Soma Takao	Pin
Keisuke Ishii	15:10

== See also ==
- Young Lion Cup
- DDT Pro-Wrestling
- Professional wrestling in Japan
