= O-40 Championship =

Professional wrestling championship

- The O-40 Championship belt

Details
- Promotion: CyberFight
- Brand: DDT Pro-Wrestling
- Date established: July 15, 2019
- Current champion: Daisuke Sasaki
- Date won: November 22, 2025
Statistics
- First champion: Sanshiro Takagi
- Most reigns: Toru Owashi (2 reigns)
- Longest reign: Toru Owashi (662 days)
- Shortest reign: Sanshiro Takagi (76 days)
- Oldest champion: Gorgeous Matsuno (58 years, 164 days)
- Youngest champion: Daisuke Sasaki (40 years, 0 days)
- Heaviest champion: Toru Owashi (110 kg (240 lb))
- Lightest champion: Gorgeous Matsuno and Makoto Oishi (75 kg (165 lb))

The O-40 Championship (Japanese: O-40王座, Hepburn: Ōbā Fōtī Ōza) is a professional wrestling championship in the Japanese promotion DDT Pro-Wrestling. The title was established in 2019 by Super Sasadango Machine in order to provide a title for wrestlers over 40 years old. The current champion is Daisuke Sasaki, who is in his first reign.

== Title history ==
As of October 13, 2026, there have been a total of eight reigns held between seven different champions and two vacancies. The current champion is Daisuke Sasaki, who is in his first reign. He defeated Antonio Honda at Shout Your Love in the Ring of Hama!, on November 22, 2025 (his 40th birthday) in Yokohama, Japan.

Key
No.	Overall reign number
Reign	Reign number for the specific champion
Days	Number of days held
Defenses	Number of successful defenses
+	Current reign is changing daily

No.	Champion	Championship change			Reign statistics			Notes	Ref.
No.	Champion	Date	Event	Location	Reign	Days	Defenses	Notes	Ref.
1	Sanshiro Takagi	July 15, 2019	Wrestle Peter Pan 2019	Tokyo, Japan	1	76	1	Defeated Super Sasadango Machine in a Weapon Rumble match to become the inaugural champion.	
2	Gorgeous Matsuno	September 29, 2019	Who's Gonna Top? 2019	Tokyo, Japan	1	406	2		
3	Toru Owashi	November 8, 2020	DDT TV Show #11	Tokyo, Japan	1	662	0		
—	Vacated	September 1, 2022	—	—	—	—	—	Owashi vacated the title to focus on his upcoming KO-D Tag Team Championship match.	
4	Makoto Oishi	March 21, 2023	Judgement 2023	Tokyo, Japan	1	364	1	Defeated Gorgeous Matsuno and Shinichiro Kawamatsu to win the vacant title.	
—	Vacated	March 19, 2024	—	—	—	—	—	Oishi was stripped of the title due to a lack of defenses.	
5	Azul Dragon	April 13, 2024	Dramatic Dream Tour 2024 in Fukuoka	Fukuoka, Japan	1	183	1	Defeated Makoto Oishi to win the vacant title.	
6	Toru Owashi	October 13, 2024	God Bless DDT 2024 Tour in Fukuoka	Fukuoka, Japan	2	192	0	This was a three-way match also involving Danshoku Dino.	
7	Antonio Honda	April 23, 2025	DDT Spring Fist Festival: Ueno Is Still Going On	Tokyo, Japan	1	213	0		
8	Daisuke Sasaki	November 22, 2025	Shout Your Love in the Ring of Hama!	Yokohama, Japan	1	325+	1		

== Combined reigns ==
†	Indicates the current champions

Rank	Wrestler	No. of reigns	Combined defenses	Combined days
1	Toru Owashi	2	0	854
2	Gorgeous Matsuno	1	2	406
3	Makoto Oishi	1	1	364
4	Daisuke Sasaki †	1	1	325+
5	Antonio Honda	1	0	213
6	Azul Dragon	1	1	183
7	Sanshiro Takagi	1	1	76

== See also ==
- IWGP U-30 Championship
- Professional wrestling in Japan
