= Damnation (professional wrestling) =

Professional wrestling stable

Damnation T.A
- First logo of Damnation

Stable
- Members: See below
- Name: Damnation
- Debut: January 31, 2016
- Years active: 2016–present

Damnation T.A. (stylized in capital letters as DAMNATION T.A.) is a villainous professional wrestling stable in the Japanese professional wrestling promotion DDT Pro-Wrestling (DDT) and on the Japanese independent scene.

The stable, originally known as Damnation, currently consists of Daisuke Sasaki, Hideki Okatani, MJ Paul, Minoru Fujita, Ryuichi "Fire" Kawakami and Ilusion. The main ideology and motto of the stable is "We don't conform, kiss ass or get married" (Japanese: 群れない・媚びない・結婚しない, Hepburn: Murenai Kobinai Kekkonshinai), affirmation which portrays the heel character of the unit.

== History ==
=== Daisuke Sasaki's first leadership (2016–2020) ===
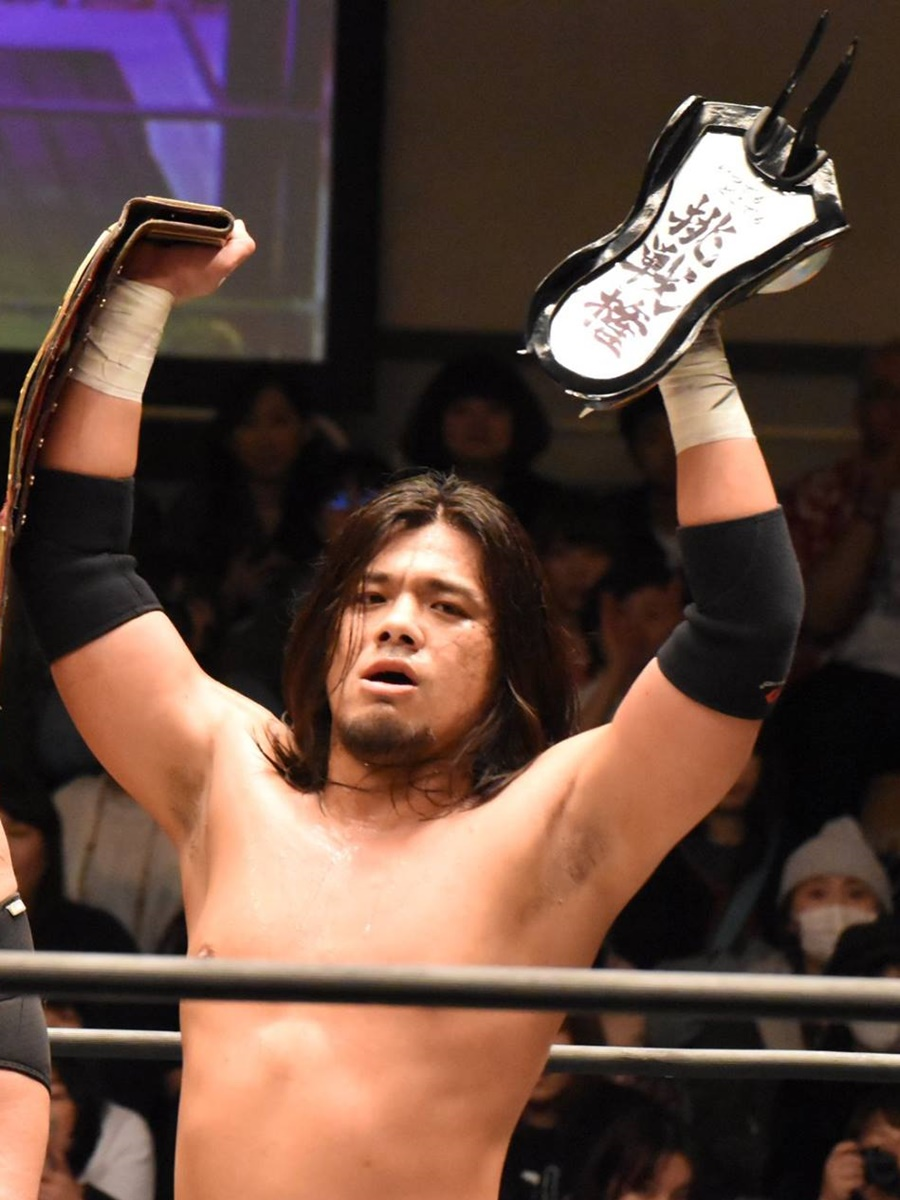
First leader of the unit Daisuke Sasaki shown here as half of the KO-D Tag Team Champions in July 2016.

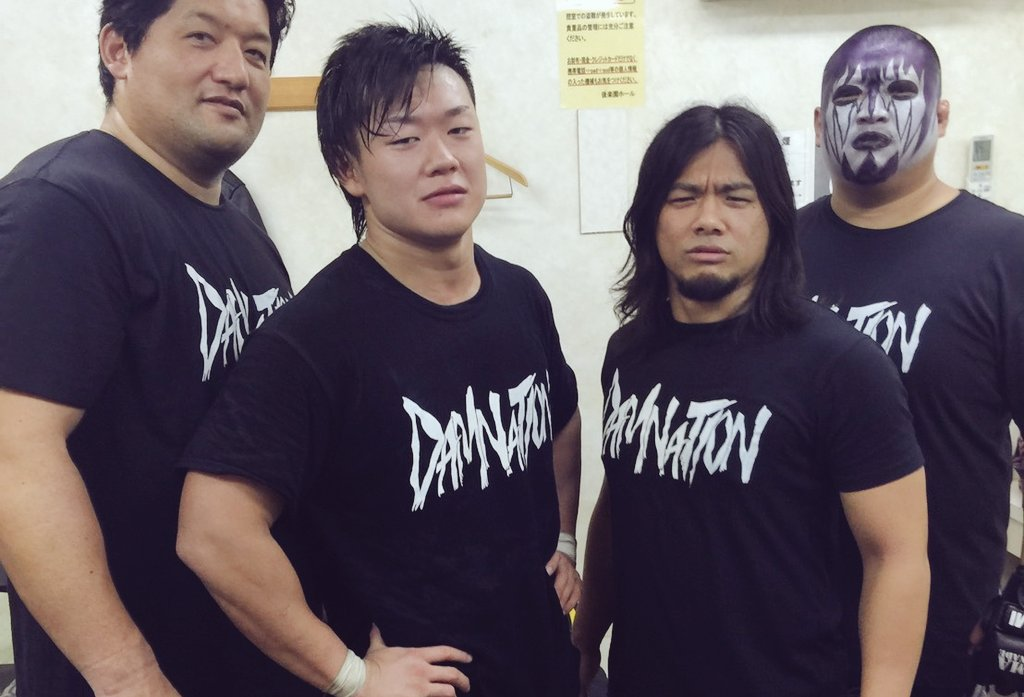
The original members of the stable, from left to right: Shuji Ishikawa, Tetsuya Endo, Daisuke Sasaki and Mad Paulie in 2016.

On January 31, 2016, at Sweet Dreams! 2016, Daisuke Sasaki announced he would team up with Shuji Ishikawa in pursuit of the KO-D Tag Team Championship. On March 21, at Judgement 2016: DDT 19th Anniversary, they defeated Konosuke Takeshita and Tetsuya Endo to win the title. On April 29, Masato Shibata debuted a new character introduced as Sasaki's pet called Mad Paulie. On July 3, Sasaki revealed that the stable would be called Damnation. Their first-ever match under that name took place at DDT Saitama Slam! Vol. 12 on July 9, 2016, where Sasaki, Paulie and Ishikawa picked up a victory over Guanchulo, Kazusada Higuchi and Kouki Iwasaki in a six-man tag team match. Tetsuya Endo left the Happy Motel unit and officially joined Damnation one week later, on July 17, 2016, after having failed to capture the KO-D Openweight Championship from Konosuke Takeshita. The stable members wrestle under various combinations, mostly consisting in teams of three, combination in which Sasaki, Paulie and Endo competed in a tournament for the vacant KO-D 6-Man Tag Team Championship which they won at DDT Saitama Slam! Vol. 13 on August 8, 2016, by defeating Shuten Doji (Kota Umeda, Masahiro Takanashi and Yukio Sakaguchi). At Ryōgoku Peter Pan 2016, a signature event promoted by DDT from the Peter Pan event series on August 28, 2016, Ishikawa successfully challenged Konosuke Takeshita to become the new KO-D Openweight Champion while Sasaki and Endo defeated Dick Togo and Mike Bailey. The stable's "gold rush" continued at the DDT Sapporo Wrestling Festa: DDT Sea Urchin on October 9, 2016, where Sasaki and Endo won the KO-D Tag Team Championship after defeating Smile Yankees (Harashima and Yuko Miyamoto). After Paulie won the Ironman Heavymetalweight Championship at Osaka Octopus 2016 on December 4, in a gauntlet battle royal also involving Kuishinbo Kamen, Dai Suzuki, Kazuki Hirata, Kenshin Chikano, Kikutaro, Masahiro Takanashi, Shoichi Uchida, Toru Owashi and Yoshihiko, each member of the stable was briefly holding a championship title until Sasaki and Endo dropped the KO-D Tag Team Championship later that night to Konosuke Takeshita and Mike Bailey.

At Judgement 2017: DDT 20th Anniversary, the first event from the Judgement series in which the unit competed, Ishikawa and Endo unsuccessfully challenged Masakatsu Funaki and Yukio Sakaguchi for the KO-D Tag Team Championship, Sasaki defeated Jun Kasai to become the new DDT Extreme Champion, and Paulie unsuccessfully competed in a Rumble rules match for the Ironman Heavymetalweight Championship and the King of Dark Championship also involving the eventual winner Guanchulo and other notable wrestlers such as Mikami, Gentaro, Poison Sawada Julie and Tomohiko Hashimoto. On June 4, Sasaki, Paulie and Endo entered the 2017 King of DDT Tournament. In the first round, Sasaki and Paulie were eliminated respectively by Akito and Shigehiro Irie while Endo won the tournament after defeating Harashima in the final on June 25, which granted him the right to challenge for the KO-D Openweight Championship. At Ryōgoku Peter Pan 2017 on August 20, Paulie defeated Gota Ihashi in a Casual Street Pro-Wrestling Extra Edition! match for the King of Dark Championship without winning the title, Sasaki defeated Akito in a Cabellera Contra Cabellera Hardcore Submission match to retain the DDT Extreme Championship and Endo unsuccessfully challenged Konosuke Takeshita for the KO-D Openweight Championship.

At Judgement 2018: DDT 21st Anniversary on March 25, Paulie teamed up with Tomomitsu Matsunaga, Hoshitango, Cherry and Gota Ihashi to defeat Mizuki Watase, Rekka, Gran MilliMeters (Daiki Shimomura and Nobuhiro Shimatani) and Takato Nakano in a ten-man tag team match, Ishikawa unsuccessfully challenged Konosuke Takeshita for the KO-D Openweight Championship, and the team of Sasaki and Endo joined forces with The Great Muta, picking up a victory over Danshoku Dino, Keisuke Ishii and Ken Ohka in a six-man tag team match. On May 8, at DDT Live! MajiManji #4, after Harashima defeated Endo in a singles match, Paulie and Sasaki attacked him. Harashima's Smile Squad stablemate Soma Takao appeared to rescue him, however, he turned on Harashima to leave Smile Squash and rejoin Damnation, turning heel in the process. On July 8, 2018, at Masahiro Takanashi's 15th Anniversary Show, Sasaki, Paulie, Takao and Endo defeated Baliyan Akki, Facade, Sammy Guevara and Shigehiro Irie in an eight-man tag team match. In the 2018 King of DDT Tournament, Sasaki defeated Endo in the finals to win his first tournament. Takao and Paulie also took part in the event, the latter falling to Harashima in the first round and Takao picking up a victory over Yuki Iino in his first match but losing to Yukio Sakaguchi in the second round. Sasaki and Endo competed against notable opponents such as Jason Kincaid and Kazusada Higuchi before making it into the finals on August 28, where Paulie and Takao also competed successfully in a three-way match against The Brahman Brothers (Brahman Kei and Brahman Shu) and Shuten Doji (Kudo and Masahiro Takanashi). On August 14, at DDT Live! MajiManji #14, the third and final chapter of DDT's sub-brand DDT New Attitude (DNA) concluded with a draft of the DNA trainees. The last pick was Nobuhiro Shimatani who was reluctantly accepted in the stable by Sasaki.

On January 3, 2019, after having toured with DDT throughout the D-Oh Grand Prix 2019 in late 2018, the Mexican luchador enmascarado Puma King teamed with Damnation in a losing effort to Disaster Box (Harashima, Toru Owashi, Kazuki Hirata and Yuki Ueno) and was then enrolled in the stable. At Wrestle Peter Pan 2019 on July 15, Shimatani teamed up with Disaster Box (Yuki Ueno and Naomi Yoshimura) in a losing effort to All Out (Shunma Katsumata and Yuki Iino) and Mizuki Watase, followed by Paulie unsuccessfully participating in a Rumble rules match for the Ironman Heavymetalweight Championship also involving Lucky Ikeda, Shiro Koshinaka, Joey Ryan and others, and finally Sasaki and Takao retaining the KO-D Tag Team Championship against UraShima (Harashima and Yasu Urano). At Ultimate Party 2019 (the first event under the Ultimate Party chronology) on November 3, Endo, Paulie and Shimatani unsuccessfully challenged Takumi Tsukamoto, Yasu Urano and Takato Nakano for the UWA World Trios Championship in a three-way match also involving Ken Ohka, Yumehito Imanari and Miss Mongol, then Sasaki and Takao retained the KO-D Tag Team Championship in a Four-way hardcore match also involving All Out (Akito and Shunma Katsumata), Iron Priest (Fuma and Yusuke Kubo) and Sento Minzoku (Minoru Fujita and Daiki Shimomura).

==== Association with #StrongHearts ====
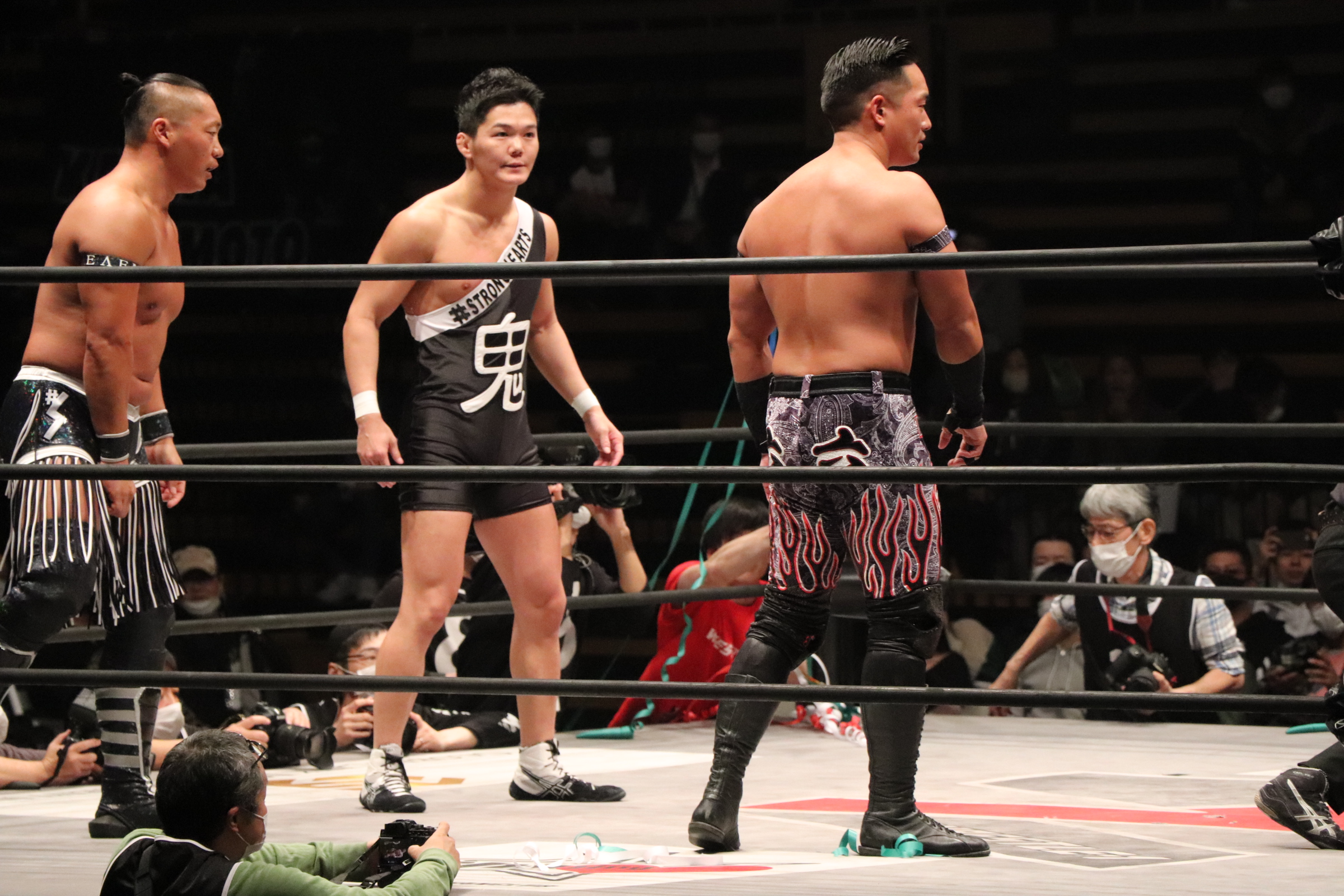
#StrongHearts subgroup of Damnation: (Cima (left), Issei Onitsuka (center) and T-Hawk (right)) in March 2020.

On January 3, 2020, Endo presented #StrongHearts (Cima, T-Hawk and El Lindaman) as associate members of the stable, wrestlers who would often compete alongside various components of the unit. This combination was referred to as the Business Alliance (業務提携, Gyōmu Teikei). At Into The Fight 2020 on February 23, Sasaki and Endo teamed up with T-Hawk and El Lindaman to defeat All Out (Akito, Shunma Katsumata and Yuki Iino) and Chihiro Hashimoto in an Eight-person elimination tag team match which represented their first collaboration match. On March 20, at Judgement 2020: DDT 23rd Anniversary, Sasaki won the DDT Universal Championship from Chris Brookes. On March 22, Endo, T-Hawk and El Lindaman won the KO-D 6-Man Tag Team Championship by defeating All Out (Takeshita, Katsumata and Iino). They then renamed the Business Alliance #DamnHearts.

==== Sasaki and Endo intern rivalry ====
On August 23, 2020, Endo won the annual King of DDT Tournament by defeating T-Hawk in the finals. Since Endo was already holding the KO-D Openweight Championship, he was allowed to choose his challenger himself. He initially named Kenny Omega, a former DDT full-time member and KO-D Openweight champion, but due to the COVID-19 pandemic, travel restrictions prevented the match from happening. At Get Alive 2020, Endo chose his leader Sasaki to be his challenger instead. On September 27, at Who's Gonna Top? 2020, Sasaki hit Endo with a low blow and ordered the rest of #DamnHearts to beat him up. They refused and attacked Sasaki instead before announcing they had collectively agreed to kick him out of the group, leaving Endo to be the de facto new leader. In a following interview, Sasaki refused to acknowledge his eviction and promised that he would leave DDT if he failed to defeat Endo.

=== Tetsuya Endo's leadership (2020–2021) ===
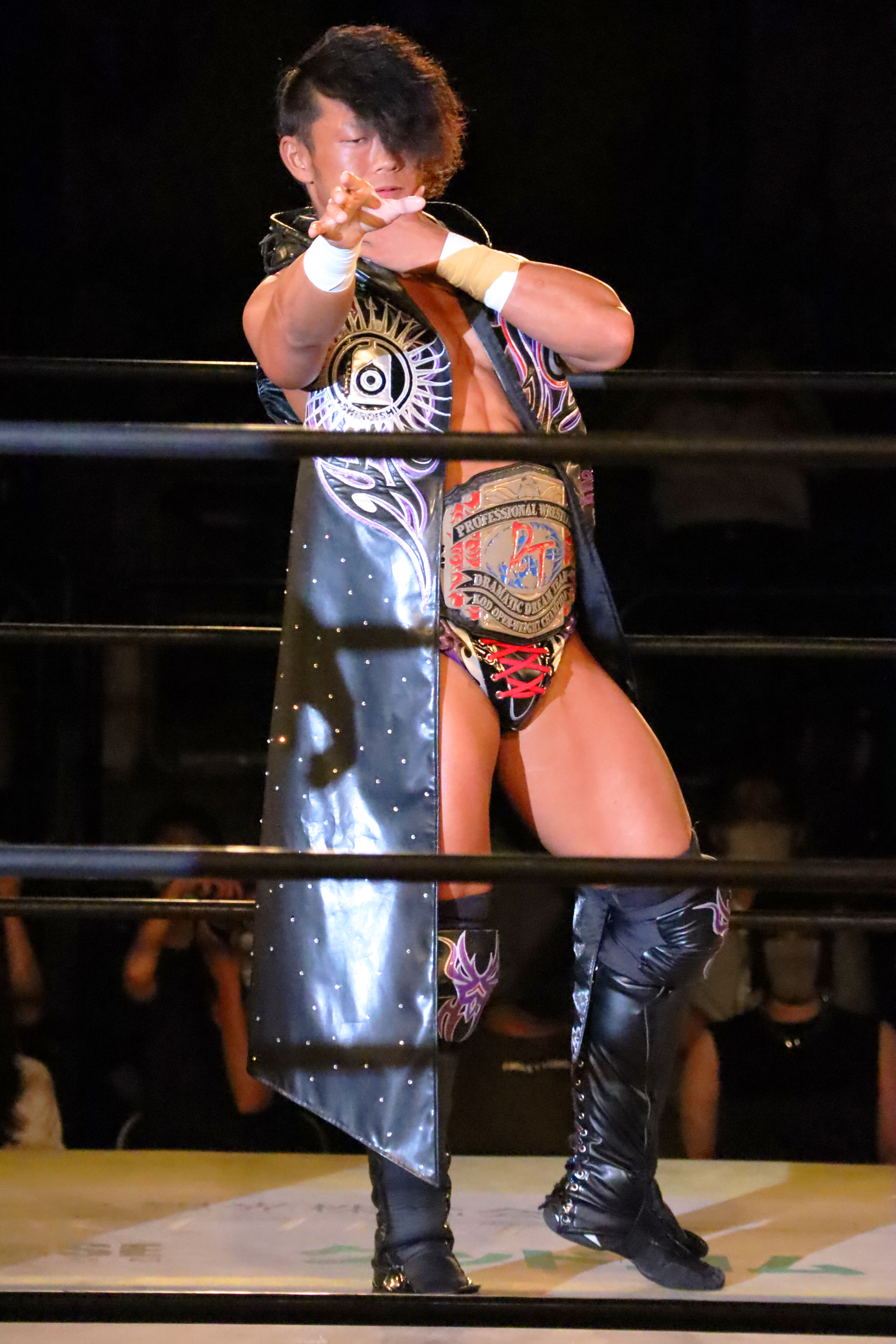
Second leader Tetsuya Endo shown here as the KO-D Openweight Champion in September 2020.

On October 3, at This Will Be Our Third Narimasu Event! 2020, a handicap match pitting Sasaki against the team of Endo and T-Hawk ended in a disqualification when Damnation interfered in order to attack Sasaki. Hiroshi Yamato came to Sasaki's rescue and the match was restarted as a regular tag team match which Yamato and Sasaki were unable to win. At Ultimate Party 2020 on November 3, Sasaki unsuccessfully challenged Endo for the KO-D Openweight Championship. After the match, Endo accepted Sasaki back in the stable along with Yamato. On December 23, Endo, Takao, Paulie and Yamato (accompanied by Sasaki who was injured) faced the DDT Sauna Club (Konosuke Takeshita, Shunma Katsumata, Mao and Yuki Ueno) in a falls count anywhere match at the Sumida Health Sports Center Pool. In the closing moments, Yuji Hino made a surprise return to DDT and aligned himself with Damnation by performing the "Fucking Bomb" on Katsumata, aiding Damnation towards victory.

In the revived 2021 Ultimate Tag League, Sasaki and Hino represented the stable and scored a total of five points in the league block after going against Junrestu (Jun Akiyama and Makoto Oishi), Eruption (Kazusada Higuchi and Yukio Sakaguchi), The Iyasarerus (Chris Brookes and Antonio Honda). They fell short to The37Kamiina (Konosuke Takeshita and Shunma Katsumata) in a tie-breaker final match whick took place on May 27, 2021. At CyberFight Festival 2021 on June 6, Sasaki, Endo and Takao defeated Chris Brookes and The37Kamiina (Katsumata and Mao) in a six-man tag team match.

On September 4, DDT held the Dramatic Survivor tournament, a single-elimination tournament for four teams of four wrestlers representing the four main DDT stables (Damnation, Disaster Box, Junretsu and The37Kamiina). In this tournament, the losing teams advanced to a final in which the losing stable would have to disband. The Damnation squad was composed of Sasaki, Endo, Takao and Hino. They lost their semi-finals to Disaster Box (Harashima, Toru Owashi, Naomi Yoshimura and Kazuki Hirata), then lost the final against The37Kamiina (Konosuke Takeshita, Shunma Katsumata, Yuki Ueno and Mao). Their final match was held on September 26, at Who's Gonna Top? 2021, in Korakuen Hall. The match saw Sasaki, Endo and Paulie defeat Takao, Ishikawa and Shimatani (with Yuji Hino) in a six-man tag team match.

=== Damnation T.A. Daisuke Sasaki's second leadership. (2021–present) ===
On October 12, 2021, at Get Alive 2021, Sasaki successfully defended the DDT Universal Championship against Isami Kodaka. After the match, he invited Takao and Endo to join him in the ring. He then attacked Takao by surprise, who he deemed responsible for their loss in the Dramatic Survivor tournament. While Takao tried to defend himself against his former stablemate, Endo simply walked out without even having entered the ring, and Masato Shibata (formerly known as Mad Paulie) came out wearing a new face paint and a new ring name of MJ Paul. Paul aligned himself with Sasaki who announced the formation of a new unit called Damnation T.A. (with T.A. standing for Total Addiction).

On January 30, 2022, at Sweet Dreams! 2022 (Ultimate Tag League 2022 Opening Match), Sasaki successfully defended the DDT Universal Championship against Minoru Fujita. After the match, Sasaki welcomed Fujita in the stable. On April 10, at April Fool 2022, Sasaki, Fujita and MJ Paul defeated Pheromones (Danshoku "Dandy" Dino, Yuki "Sexy" Iino and Yumehito "Fantastic" Imanari) to win the KO-D 6-Man Tag Team Championship.

On October 3, 2024, just a month after having joined Schadenfreude International, Ilusión betrayed his stable and jumped ship to Damnation T.A.

=== Independent circuit (2017–2021) ===
Various members of the unit are known to have made sporadic appearances in other promotions. On June 13, 2017, Ishikawa and Endo teamed up to defeat Nextream (Kento Miyahara and Yuma Aoyagi) on the second night of the Dynamite Series 2017, an event promoted by All Japan Pro Wrestling (AJPW). At Machida Pro-Wrestling Festival Vol. 1, a freelance show promoted by the Japanese independent scene on September 8, 2017, Sasaki and Endo represented the unit as the defeated the team of Speed Of Sounds (Hercules Senga and Tsutomu Oosugi) in a tag team match, as well as Ishikawa teaming up with Masashi Takeda to pick up a victory over Big Japan Pro Wrestling's Daisuke Sekimoto and Yuko Miyamoto. At Great Voyage in Yokohama Vol. 2, an event promoted by Pro Wrestling Noah on December 16, 2018, Nobuhiro Shimatani, who represented the stable, teamed up with Kazusada Higuchi and Kota Umeda in a losing effort to Atsushi Kotoge, Kenoh and Masa Kitamiya. On May 4, 2019, at Mercury Rising, an event promoted by WWNLive, Sasaki, Takao and Endo defeated The Skulk (Adrian Alanis, A. R. Fox and Leon Ruff). At Infinity: 2021 Spring, an event promoted by Active Advance Pro Wrestling (2AW) on February 7, Ishikawa represented the stable as he teamed up with Ryuki Honda in a losing effort to Kengo Mashimo and Tatsuya Hanami.

== Members ==
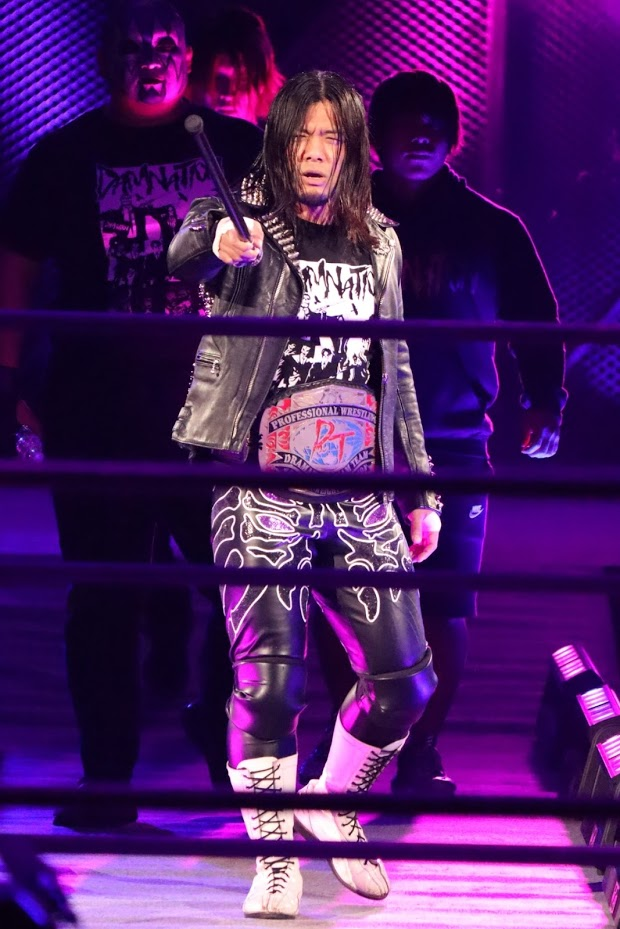
Daisuke Sasaki (I–III)

Minoru Fujita

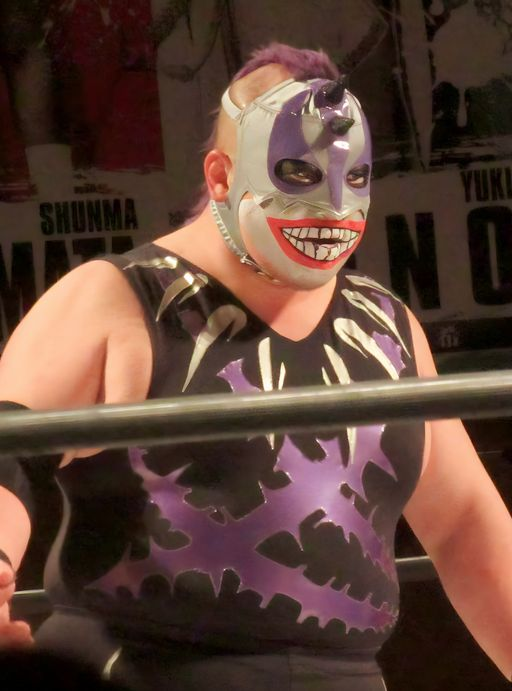
MJ Paul

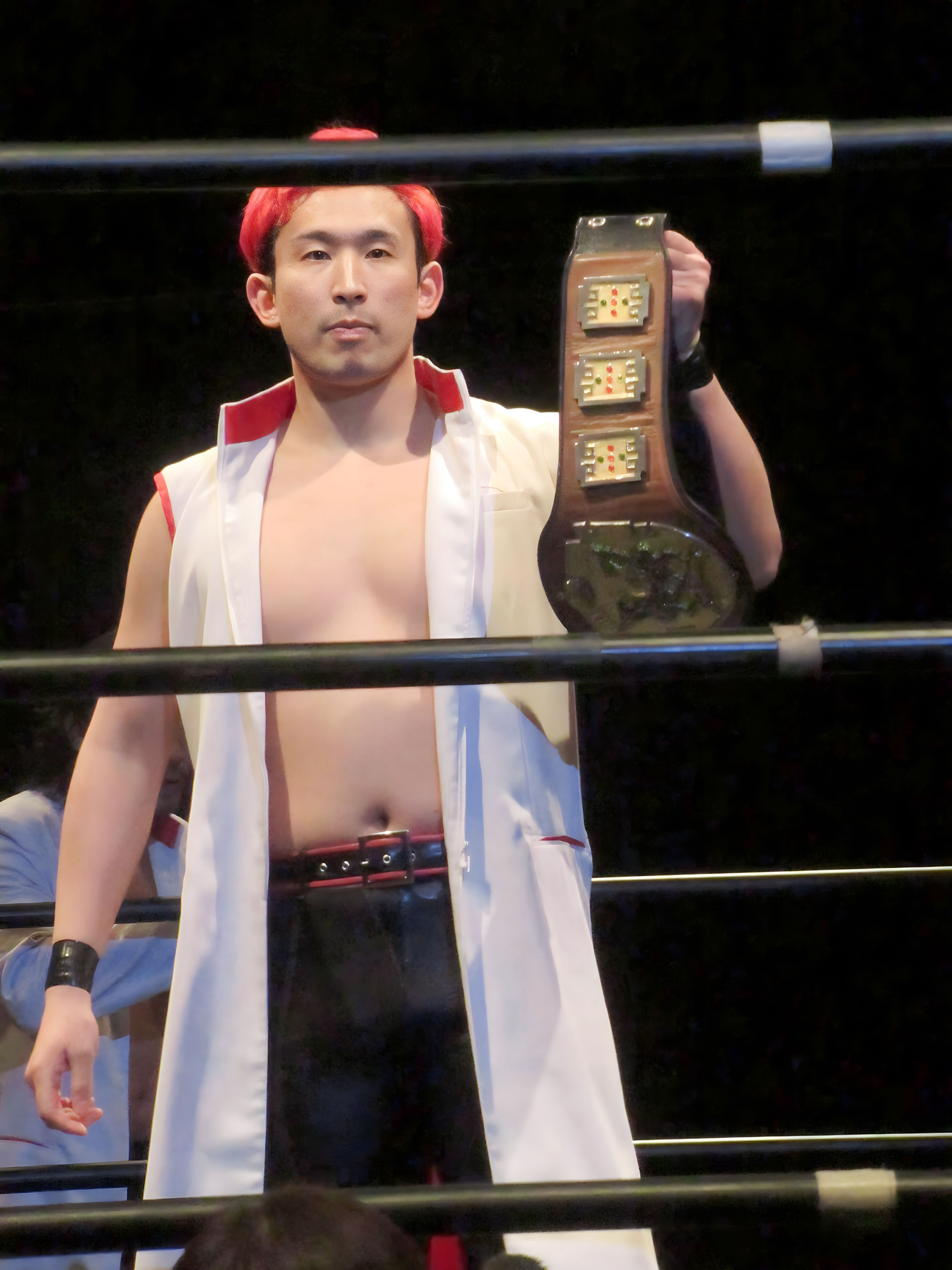
Hideki Okatani

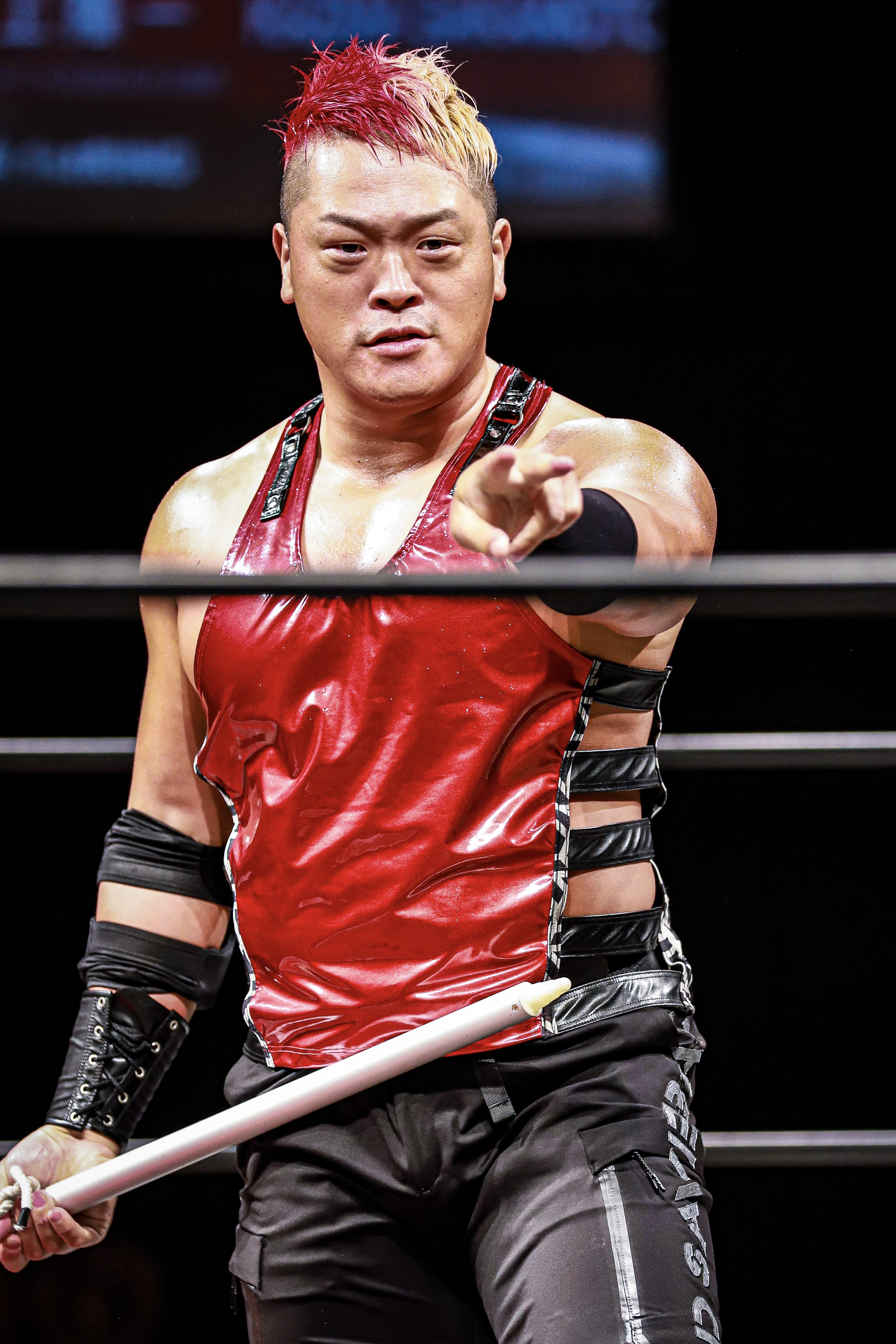
Ryuichi "Fire" Kawakami

*	Founding member
I–III	Leader

=== Current members ===
Member		Joined
Daisuke Sasaki	* I–III	January 31, 2016
Hideki Okatani		February 23, 2025
Minoru Fujita		January 30, 2022
MJ Paul		April 29, 2016
Ryuichi "Fire" Kawakami		July 21, 2024
Ilusion		October 3, 2024

=== Former members ===
Member		Joined	Left
Hiroshi Yamato		November 3, 2020	September 26, 2021
Kanon		May 1, 2022	February 23, 2025
Nobuhiro Shimatani		August 14, 2018	September 26, 2021
Shuji Ishikawa	*	January 31, 2016	September 26, 2021
Soma Takao		May 8, 2018	September 26, 2021
Tetsuya Endo	II	July 17, 2016	September 26, 2021
Yuji Hino		December 23, 2020	September 26, 2021

== Sub-groups ==
Affiliate	Members	Type	Promotion(s)
Twin Towers	Shuji Ishikawa; Kohei Sato	Tag team	Zero1
Violent Giants	Shuji Ishikawa; Suwama	Tag team	AJPW
#StrongHearts (Note: 1. StrongHearts were an associate subgroup affiliated to Gleat and often competing in DDT between 2019 and 2020.)	Cima; T-Hawk; El Lindaman; Issei Onitsuka	Stable	OWE; Gleat

== Championships and accomplishments ==
*Wrestlers with their names wrote with italic were supporters of the stable while teaming up with members of the unit.

As Damnation

- All Japan Pro Wrestling

- Gaora TV Championship (1 time) – Ishikawa
- Triple Crown Heavyweight Championship (1 time) – Ishikawa
- World Tag Team Championship (4 times) – Ishikawa with Suwama
- Champion Carnival – Ishikawa (2017)
- World's Strongest Tag Determination League – Ishikawa with Suwama (2017, 2019)

- Best Body Japan Pro-Wrestling

- BBW Tag Team Championship (2 times) – Shimatani (1) with Yakan Nabe and Yamato (1) with Seiya Morohashi

- Big Japan Pro Wrestling

- BJW Tag Team Championship (1 time) – Ishikawa with Kohei Sato
- Ikkitousen Strong Climb – Ishikawa (2016)

- DDT Pro-Wrestling

- DDT Extreme Championship (1 time) – Sasaki
- DDT Universal Championship (3 times) – Sasaki
- Independent World Junior Heavyweight Championship (1 time) – Sasaki
- Ironman Heavymetalweight Championship (31 times) – Paulie (3), Endo (1), Takao (4), Puma King (8), Shimatani (9), Sasaki (5), Yamato (1)
- KO-D 6-Man Tag Team Championship (9 times, current) – Sasaki, Paulie and Endo (1), Endo, Paulie and Takao (1), Endo, T-Hawk and El Lindaman (1), (Note: During this title reign T-Hawk and El Lindaman were not officially recognized as stable members.) Endo, Takao and Hino (1), and Sasaki, Paulie and Kanon (3), Sasaki, Okatani and Ilusion (2)
- KO-D 10-Man Tag Team Championship (1 time, current) – Sasaki, Demus, Okatani, Paul and Ilusion
- KO-D Openweight Championship (6 times) – Ishikawa (1), Sasaki (3), Endo (2)
- KO-D Tag Team Championship (5 times) – Sasaki and Ishikawa (1), Sasaki and Endo (1), Paulie and Endo (1), Sasaki and Takao (1), Sasaki and Paul (1)
- D-Oh Grand Prix – Ishikawa (2018)
- King of DDT – Ishikawa (2016), Endo (2017, 2020) and Sasaki (2018)

- Japan Indie Awards

- Best Unit Award (2016, 2017)

- Pro Wrestling Illustrated

- Ranked Endo No. 102 of the top 500 singles wrestlers in the PWI 500 in 2020
- Ranked Ishikawa No. 105 of the top 500 singles wrestlers in the PWI 500 in 2018
- Ranked Sasaki No. 129 of the top 500 singles wrestlers in the PWI 500 in 2019
- Ranked Hino No. 321 of the top 500 singles wrestlers in the PWI 500 in 2021
- Ranked Puma King No. 406 of the top 500 singles wrestlers in the PWI 500 in 2019

- Tokyo Sports

- Best Technique Award – Endo (2020)
- Best Tag Team Award – Ishikawa with Suwama (2017, 2018, 2019)

As Damnation T.A

- DDT Pro-Wrestling

- KO-D 6-Man Tag Team Championship (3 times, current) – Sasaki, Fujita and Paul (1); Sasaki, Paul and Kanon (2, current)

== See also ==
- The 37Kamiina
- Burning
