= Tetsuya Endo (wrestler) =

Japanese wrestler (born 1991)

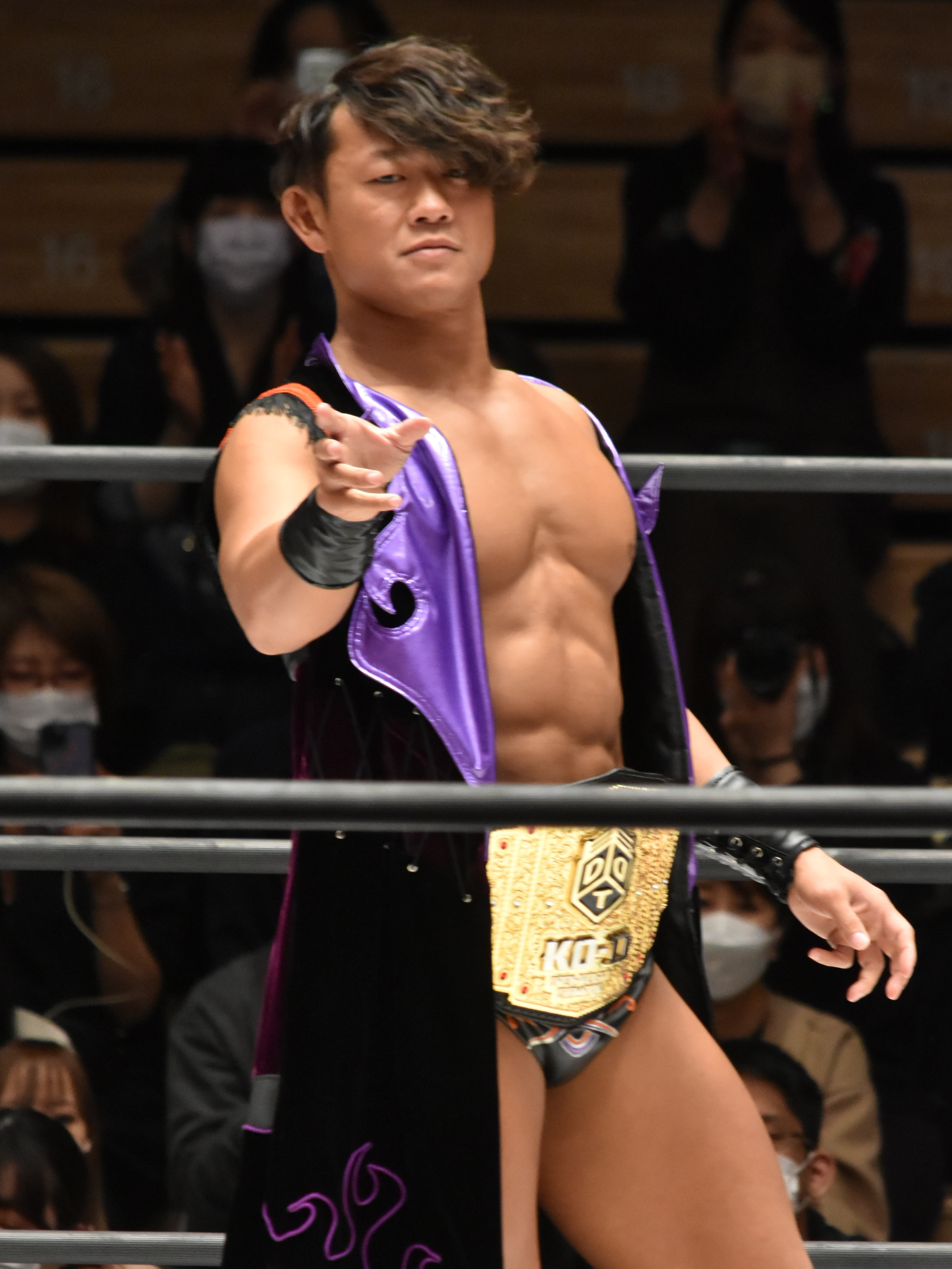
- Endo in March 2022

Personal information
- Born: Tetsuya Endo (遠藤 哲哉, Endō Tetsuya); August 11, 1991 (age 35) Shiroishi, Miyagi

Professional wrestling career
- Ring name(s): Tetsuya Endo; Endo=Pehlwan
- Billed height: 180 cm (5 ft 11 in)
- Billed weight: 80 kg (176 lb)
- Trained by: Keita Yano
- Debut: April 1, 2012

Tetsuya Endo (遠藤 哲哉, Endō Tetsuya; born August 11, 1991) is a Japanese professional wrestler, who has currently worked for DDT Pro-Wrestling (DDT) since his debut in April 2012. He is a three-time KO-D Openweight Champion, former four-time KO-D Tag Team Champion and former one-time DDT Universal Champion. Endo also makes appearances on the Japanese promotion Pro Wrestling Noah where is a member of White Raven Squad and former one-time GHC National Champion.

== Professional wrestling career ==
=== DDT Pro-Wrestling (2012–present) ===
==== Debut and early career (2012) ====
After training under Keita Yano, Endo made his professional debut on April 1, 2012, teaming with Keisuke Ishii in a loss to Hiroshi Fukuda and Akito. 29 days after his debut, Endo gained his first win, defeating Daishi at a Kaientai Dojo show. Endo lost the majority of matches he competed in throughout 2012 and 2013, a common thing for young wrestlers in Japan as a method of earning one's place in the company and gaining experience.

==== Teaming with Konosuke Takeshita (2013–2016) ====
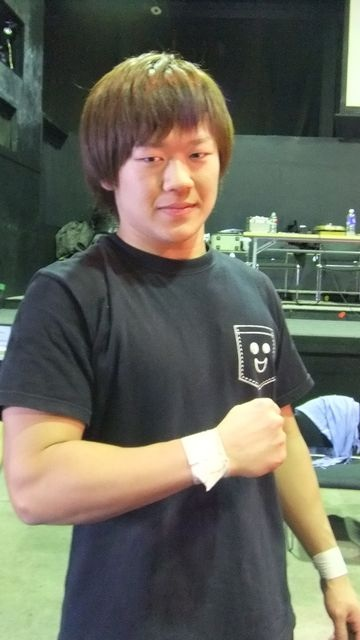
Endo in October 2012

In 2013, Endo began teaming with fellow rookie Konosuke Takeshita, teaming with him in a KO-D Tag Team Championship number one contenders match also featuring Kudo and Yasu Urano, losing to the Golden Lovers (Kota Ibushi and Kenny Omega).

On January 13, 2014, Endo and Takeshita again faced the Golden Lovers in a number one contenders match, this time going to a time limit draw, making the match for the championships at Sweet Dreams on January 26 a three-way. Endo and Takeshita unsuccessfully challenged champions Yuko Miyamoto and Isami Kodaka, with the Golden Lovers winning the match and the championships. On July 13, Endo won his first championship in DDT, teaming with Takeshita and Antonio Honda as Happy Motel to defeat Shuten-dōji (Kudo, Masa Takanashi and Yukio Sakaguchi) to win the KO-D 6-Man Tag Team Championship. Happy Motel dropped the championships back to Shuten-dōji on July 20 in a three-way match also featuring Team Dream Futures (Keisuke Ishii, Shigehiro Irie and Soma Takao). Endo competed in the KO-D Openweight Championship Number One Contenders Tournament, defeating partner Takeshita in the semi-finals on August 24, but losing to Keisuke Ishii in the final. On September 28, Endo and Takeshita captured the KO-D Tag Team Championship, defeating the Golden Lovers. The duo successfully defended the championships for 6 months, defeating Shuten-dōji (Kudo and Masa Takanashi), Team Dream Futures (Keisuke Ishii and Shigehiro Irie), Makoto Oishi and Shiori Asahi and Kudo and Yukio Sakaguchi before dropping the belts to Daisuke Sekimoto and Yuji Okabayashi on February 15.

On September 13, Endo and Takeshita unsuccessfully challenged the Golden Storm Riders (Kota Ibushi and Daisuke Sasaki) for the KO-D Tag Team Championship. Endo received his first opportunity at the KO-D Openweight Championship on December 13, unsuccessfully challenging Isami Kodaka. After the KO-D Tag Team Championship was vacated due to Kota Ibushi being sidelined with a cervical disc herniation, a tournament was set up to crown new champions, won by Endo and Takeshita after they defeated Shigehiro Irie and Yuji Okabayashi in the final on December 23. On December 29, Endo and Takeshita competed in a special mixed tag team match, teaming with Stardom's Io Shirai to defeat Shuten-dōji (Kota Umeda and Yukio Sakaguchi) and Kyoko Kimura.

Endo and Takeshita made their first successful defence of the tag team championships on January 16, 2016, defeating Isami Kodaka and Ryota Nakatsu, but lost the championships to Damnation (Shuji Ishikawa and Daisuke Sasaki) at Judgement, on March 23, and unsuccessfully challenged them in a rematch on April 24. In June, Endo participated in the 2016 King of DDT Tournament, making it to the semi-finals before being eliminated by eventual winner Shuji Ishikawa.

==== Damnation (2016–2021) ====
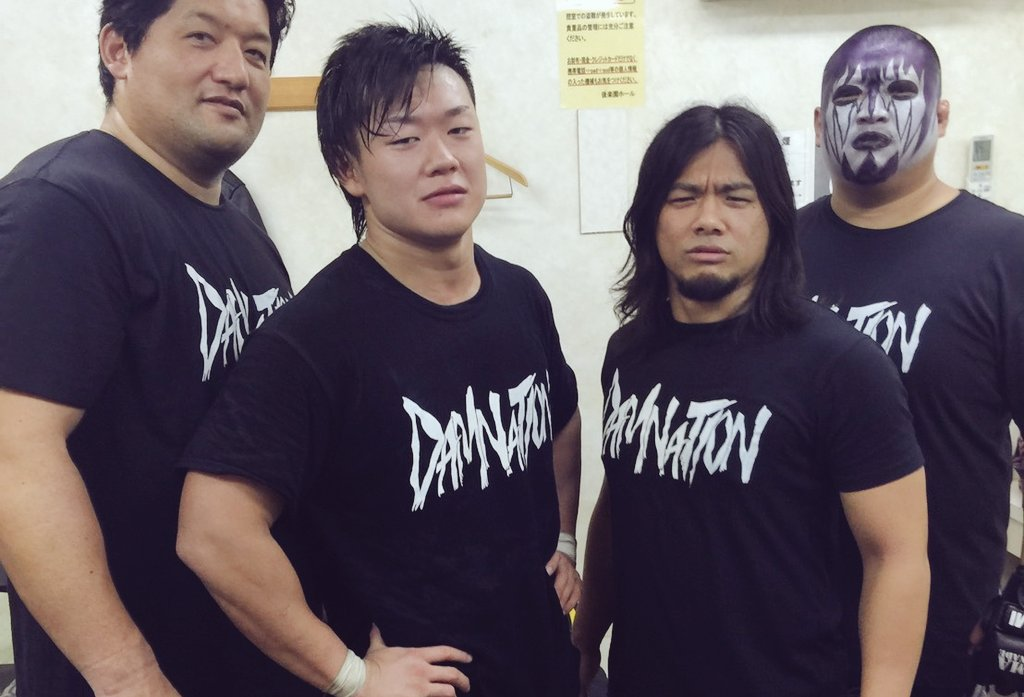
Endo (second from left) as part of Damnation

On July 17, 2016, Endo unsuccessfully challenged longtime friend and tag team partner Takeshita for his KO-D Openweight Championship. After the match, Daisuke Sasaki made his way to the ring, carrying a Damnation T-shirt and offering Endo a spot in the group. At the same time, Takeshita offered a handshake as a sign of respect for his longtime friend. Endo pushed Takeshita away, taking the Damnation T-shirt instead, attacking Takeshita, joining Damnation and turning heel for the first time in his career. On August 6, Endo, Sasaki and Mad Paulie defeated Shuten-dōji (Kota Umeda, Masahiro Takanashi and Yukio Sakaguchi) in the finals of a tournament to win the KO-D 6-Man Tag Team Championship. On October 9, Endo and Sasaki won the KO-D Tag Team Championship, becoming double champions, however, on December 4, Endo and Sasaki lost the KO-D Tag Team Championship to Takeshita and Mike Bailey and on December 11, lost the KO-D 6 Man Tag Team Championship to Shuten-dōji (Takanashi, Sakaguchi and Kudo).

On March 20, 2017, at Judgement, Endo and Shuji Ishikawa unsuccessfully challenged Sakaguchi and Masakatsu Funaki for the KO-D Tag Team Championship. On June 25, Endo defeated Harashima in the final to win the 2017 King of DDT Tournament.

On May 29, 2018, Endo won the Right to Challenge Anytime, Anywhere contract in a rumble rules match to receive an opportunity to the KO-D Openweight Championship. On June 26, Endo and Paulie defeated Kazusada Higuchi and Daisuke Sekimoto to become the new KO-D Tag Team Champions. On July 22, Endo and Paulie lost the titles to Moonlight Express (Mike Bailey and Mao). From November 30 until December 15, Endo took part in the 2019 D-Oh Grand Prix, where he finished the tournament with a record of three wins and three losses, failing to advance to the finals of the tournament. During the tournament, Endo briefly held the Ironman Heavymetalweight Championship.

On April 5, 2019, at DDT Is Coming to America, Endo cashed his Right to Challenge Anytime, Anywhere contract against stablemate Daisuke Sasaki to win the KO-D Openweight Champion, before losing the title to his rival Konosuke Takeshita on July 15, at Wrestle Peter Pan.

On February 23, 2020, at Into The Fight, Endo defeated Akito to win the Saitama Super Arena Sword, symbolizing a KO-D Openweight title shot at Wrestle Peter Pan 2020 (initially scheduled to take place at the Saitama Super Arena). However, on May 2, Endo lost the sword to Kazusada Higuchi. On May 16, Endo teamed with his Damnation stablemate Daisuke Sasaki in a winning effort against All Out (Akito and Konosuke Takeshita), with Endo pinning Akito, winning Akito's Right to Challenge Anytime, Anywhere contract in the process. Using the rules of the Right to Challenge Anytime, Anywhere contract to his advantage, Endo immediately cashed it in against Kazusada Higuchi to challenge him for the sword. Endo won the match and thus regained the Saitama Super Arena Sword. On June 7, on the second night of Wrestle Peter Pan, Endo successfully cashed in his Saitama Super Arena Sword against Masato Tanaka to win the KO-D Openweight Championship for the second time. He lost the title to 2021 D-Oh Grand Prix winner Jun Akiyama at Kawasaki Strong, on February 14, 2021.

On September 4, 2021, Damnation took part in the Dramatic Survivor tournament, in which the losing unit would be forced to disband. Damnation and The37Kamiina faced each other in the finals after both teams lost their first round match. This led to Damnation losing and as a result being forced to disband. Their final match was held on September 26, in Korakuen Hall. The match saw Daisuke Sasaki, Endo and Mad Paulie defeat Soma Takao, Shuji Ishikawa and Nobuhiro Shimatani (with Yuji Hino) in a six-man tag team match.

==== Fourth incarnation of Burning (2021–2024) ====
On December 7, 2021, DDT announced that, at the request of Endo and Jun Akiyama, Kenta Kobashi had endorsed the reformation of the Burning stable (originally formed in 1998, in All Japan Pro Wrestling) for its fourth incarnation. Endo and Akiyama were immediately joined by Yusuke Okada and Yuya Koroku. On December 26, at Never Mind 2021 in Yoyogi, this new stable debuted by defeating The37Kamiina (Shunma Katsumata, Yuki Ueno, Mao and Toui Kojima).

On March 20, 2022, at Judgement 2022, Endo defeated his longtime rival and former tag team partner Konosuke Takeshita to regain the KO-D Openweight Championship for the third time. On June 12, at CyberFight Festival 2022, Endo would suffer a concussion during a match between him and his Burning stablemate Jun Akiyama and Kazusada Higuchi against Katsuhiko Nakajima, Atsushi Kotoge and Yoshiki Inamura as result he would be forced to relinquish his KO-D Openweight Championship and forfeit his spot in the 2022 King of DDT tournament.

From November 1 until December 4, Endo took part in the 2022 D-Oh Grand Prix, where finished his block with a record of two wins, and two losses and one draw, failing to advance to the finals of the tournament. On December 29, Endo, Okada and their new stablemate Kotaro Suzuki defeated Naruki Doi, Toru Owashi and Kazuki Hirata to win KO-D 6-Man Tag Team Championship. They lost the titles to Shinya Aoki, Super Sasadango Machine and Yuki Ueno on February 26, 2023.

On March 21, at Judgement, Endo defeated Naruki Doi to win the DDT Universal Championship. He lost the title to Matt Cardona on July 23 at Wrestle Peter Pan. On October 4, Endo was confronted with his past when Daisuke Sasaki asked him to join DAMNATION T.A after their match. While Endo was on good terms with Sasaki, he refused to join the stable because it cannot compare to the original DAMNATION they were both a part of, with Endo suggesting that Sasaki should join Burning instead, setting up a match at Ultimate Party on November 12, which Endo lost. From November 26 until December 24, Endo took part in the 2023 D-Oh Grand Prix, where he finished the tournament with a record of three wins and two losses, advancing to the finals of the tournament. On January 3, 2024, Endo was defeated by Yukio Naya in the finals. Afterwards, Sasaki advised Endo to leave Burning and join him, but before Endo could answer he advised Endo to think about his words. On January 5, Endo refused to join DAMNATION T.A, leading Sasaki to attack Endo, before being saved by Yuki Iino, staying at Burning. The following day, DAMNATION T.A attacked Endo during his match against Takeshi Masada. On February 7, Endo and Iino defeated Daisuke Sasaki and KANON to win the KO-D Tag Team Championship. They lost the titles to Chris Brookes and Takeshi Masada on August 10.

On December 28 at Ultimate Party, Endo announced that Burning would be disbanded.

=== Pro-Wrestling Noah (2023–Present) ===
On February 21, 2023, at Keiji Mutoh Grand Final Pro-Wrestling "Last-Love", Endo made his debut in Pro Wrestling Noah, teaming with Yuya Koroku, Hideki Okatani and Takeshi Masada in a losing effort to The 37KAMIINA (MAO, Shunma Katsumata, Toi Kojima and Yuki Ueno). Over the following year, he began working more regularly in NOAH at their Limit Break events.

On January 2, 2025 at New Year Reboot, Endo announced that he would start working regularly for NOAH, before declaring that he would win all titles in NOAH. Later that night, Endo challenged Manabu Soya to a title match for the GHC National Championship. At the event, on January 11, Team 2000 X interfered in the match, with Endo picking up Yoshitatsu's tonfa, before hitting Soya with it and performing a shooting star press to become the new champion. Afterwards, he was accepted into Team 2000 X, turning heel in the process. He lost the title back to Soya on February 11. On April 14, Endo was confronted by Jun Akiyama and Takashi Sugiura in a post-match interview, as Sugiura stated that he wanted Akiyama's help to bring Endo back to the correct path. Sugiura stated that he wanted to team with Akiyama in doing so, leading to a match on May 3, at Memorial Voyage in Kokugikan, where he and Owadasan were defeated by Akiyama and Sugiura.

== Championships and accomplishments ==
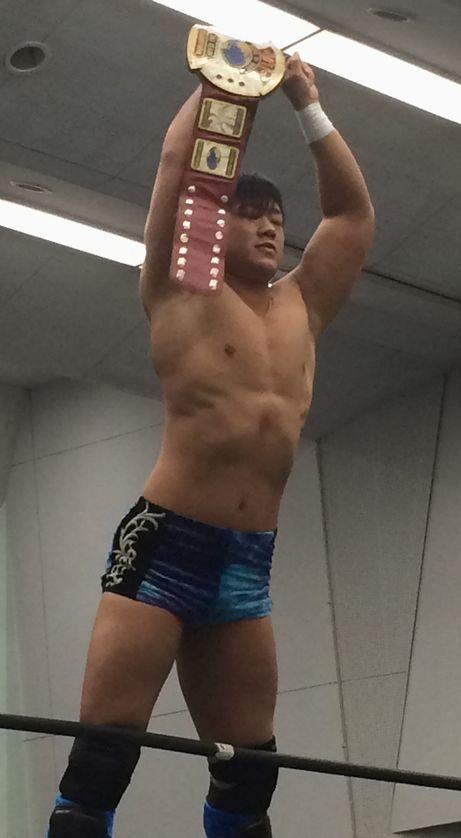
Endo as one half of the KO-D Tag Team Champions in January 2015

- DDT Pro-Wrestling

- KO-D Openweight Championship (3 times)
- DDT Universal Championship (1 time)
- Ironman Heavymetalweight Championship (1 time)
- KO-D 6-Man Tag Team Championship (6 times) – with Konosuke Takeshita and Antonio Honda (1),Daisuke Sasaki and Mad Paulie (1), Mad Paulie and Soma Takao (1), T-Hawk and El Lindaman (1), Soma Takao and Yuji Hino (1), and Kotaro Suzuki and Yusuke Okada (1)
- KO-D Tag Team Championship (5 times) – with Daisuke Sasaki (1), Konosuke Takeshita (2), Mad Paulie (1) and Yuki Iino (1)
- KO-D Tag Team Championship Tournament (2015) – with Konosuke Takeshita
- King of DDT Tournament (2017, 2020)

- Best Body Japan Pro Wrestling

- BBW Tag Team Championship (1 time) – with Gorgeous Matsuno

- Big Japan Pro Wrestling

- Toshiwasure! Shuffle Six Man Tag Team Tournament (2023) – with Daisuke Sekimoto and Fuminori Abe
- Toshiwasure! Shuffle Tag Tournament (2019) – with Takuya Nomura

- Japan Indie Awards

- Best Bout Award (2014) with Konosuke Takeshita vs. Kenny Omega and Kota Ibushi on October 28
- Best Bout Award (2020) vs. Daisuke Sasaki on November 3
- Best Unit Award (2016, 2017) Damnation with Daisuke Sasaki, Mad Paulie and Shuji Ishikawa

- Pro Wrestling Illustrated
  - Ranked No. 79 of the top 500 singles wrestlers in the PWI 500 in 2022
- Pro Wrestling Noah

- GHC National Championship (1 time)

- Tokyo Sports

- Technique Award (2020)
