= Masato Shibata =

Japanese professional wrestler

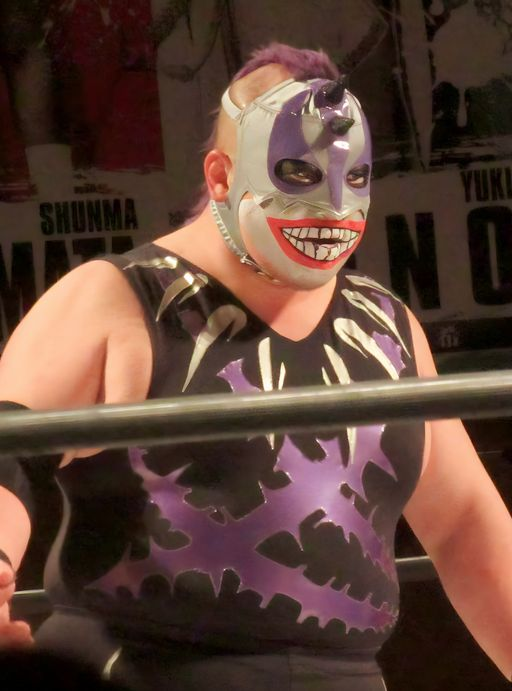
- Shibata as MJ Paul in September 2023

Personal information
- Born: Masato Shibata (柴田 正人, Shibata Masato); September 13, 1978 (age 48) Akiruno, Tokyo

Professional wrestling career
- Ring names: MJ Paul; Mad Paulie; Masato Shibata
- Billed height: 180 cm (5 ft 11 in)
- Billed weight: 140 kg (309 lb)
- Trained by: U-File Camp
- Debut: December 17, 2003

Masato Shibata (柴田 正人, Shibata Masato; born September 13, 1978) is a Japanese professional wrestler primarily working for DDT Pro-Wrestling (DDT), where he competes as part of the Damnation T.A unit under the ring name MJ Paul (MJポー, Emu Jē Pō). He was previously known under the name Mad Paulie (マッド・ポーリー, Maddo Pōrī).

== Professional wrestling career ==
=== Style-E, IGF and BJW (2003–2016) ===
After training at Kiyoshi Tamura's U-File Camp, Shibata debuted in December 2003 and primarily competed in Style-E for the next few years. In March 2007, he received his first opportunity at the Style-E Openweight Championship, unsuccessfully challenging Isami Kodaka. In December, he once again challenged for the title, this time losing to Kazuhiro Tamura. In March 2012, Shibata teamed up with Shota to unsuccessfully challenge DDT's Sanshiro Takagi and Soma Takao for the KO-D Tag Team Championship. In June, Shibata once again unsuccessfully challenged for the Style-E Openweight Championship, losing to Kenichiro Arai. In September, Shibata won Apache Pro Wrestling's WEW Tag Team Championship, teaming with Kotaru Nasu to defeat Kengo Nishimura and Tomohiko Hashimoto, but lost the championship to Hashimoto and Shoichi Imiya two weeks later.

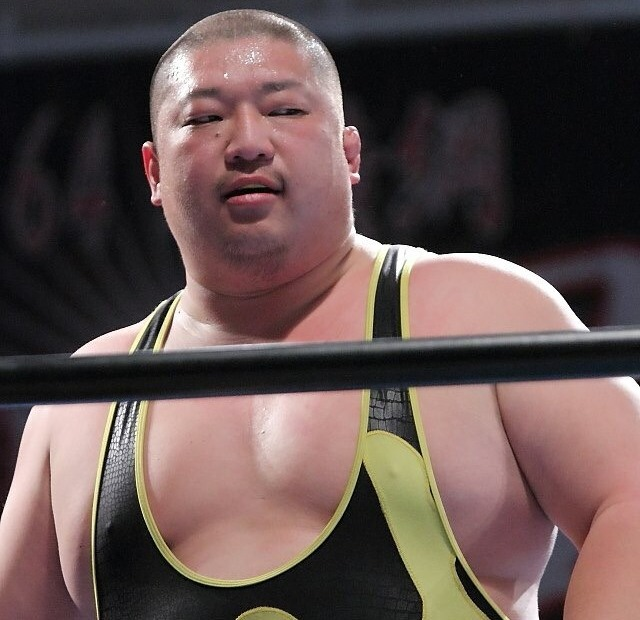
Shibata in 2015

In January 2015, Shibata teamed with Shuji Ishikawa to capture the UWA World Tag Team Championship, defeating Isami Kodaka and Fuma in overtime. The duo lost the championship to the Brahman Brothers in June.

=== DDT (2008–present) ===
Shibata began competing in DDT sporadically in 2008, mainly in their sister promotion Union Pro, but in April 2016, Shibata became a regular in DDT, changing his name to Mad Paulie and aligning himself with Daisuke Sasaki as Sasaki's "pet". In his first match as Paulie, Shibata and Sasaki defeated Yukio Sakaguchi and Masa Takanashi. Soon after, Sasaki and Paulie were joined by Shuji Ishikawa, with Sasaki calling Ishikawa his other "pet". The trio dubbed themselves "Damnation", and in July added a fourth member to their ranks when Tetsuya Endo turned on his partner Konosuke Takeshita to join. In August, Paulie, Sasaki, and Endo entered the tournament for the vacant KO-D 6 Man Tag Team Championship, defeating Shuten-dōji (Sakaguchi, Takanashi and Kota Umeda) in the final to win the tournament and the championship. On October 10, they made their first successful defence, defeating Happy Motel (Antonio Honda and Konosuke Takeshita) and Mike Bailey, but dropped the championship to Shuten-dōji (Takanashi, Sakaguchi and Kudo) on November 11.

== Championships and accomplishments ==
- Apache Pro Wrestling Army

- WEW World Tag Team Championship (1 time) – with Kotaro Nasu

- DDT Pro-Wrestling

- KO-D Tag Team Championship (2 times) – with Tetsuya Endo (1), and Daisuke Sasaki (1)
- KO-D 6 Man Tag Team Championship (6 times) – with Tetsuya Endo and Daisuke Sasaki (1), Tetsuya Endo and Soma Takao (1), Daisuke Sasaki and Minoru Fujita (1), and Daisuke Sasaki and Kanon (3, current)
- KO-D 10-Man Tag Team Championship (1 time, current) – with Daisuke Sasaki, Demus 3:16, Hideki Okatani and Ilusion
- Ironman Heavymetalweight Championship (3 times)

- Guts World Pro-Wrestling

- GWC 6-Man Tag Team Championship (1 time) – with Masashi Takeda and Kotaro Nasu

- Japan Indie Awards

- Best Unit Award (2016, 2017) – Damnation with Daisuke Sasaki, Shuji Ishikawa and Tetsuya Endo

- Kaientai Dojo

- UWA World Tag Team Championship (1 time) – with Shuji Ishikawa

- Pro-Wrestling Secret Base

- Captain Of The Secret Base Tag Team Championship (1 time) – with Bear Fukuda

- River City Wrestling

- RCW International Championship (1 time)

- Style-E

- Style-E Tag Team Championship (1 time) – with Bear Fukuda
