= Daisuke Sasaki =

Japanese professional wrestler (born 1985)

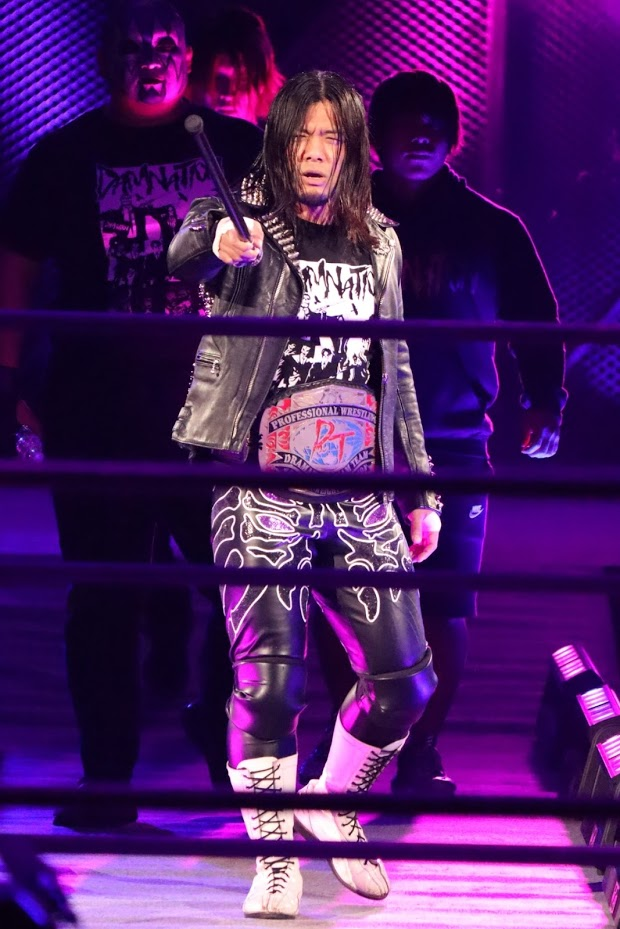
- Sasaki in 2020

Personal information
- Born: November 22, 1985 (age 40) Nerima, Tokyo

Professional wrestling career
- Ring name(s): Daisuke Sasaki; DJ Sasaki; Momotarō; Nerima Sting; Sasaki; Sasaki & Gabbana; Son Goku
- Billed height: 1.68 m (5 ft 6 in)
- Billed weight: 80 kg (176 lb)
- Trained by: Dick Togo
- Debut: October 22, 2005

Daisuke Sasaki (佐々木 大輔, Sasaki Daisuke; born November 22, 1985) is a Japanese professional wrestler. He is signed to DDT Pro-Wrestling (DDT), where he is the leader of Damnation T.A. and the current O-40 Champion in his first reign and a current KO-D 6-Man Tag Team Champion in his 9th reign with Hideki Okatani and Illusion. He is also a former three-time KO-D Openweight Champion, one-time DDT Extreme Champion, six-time KO-D Tag Team Champion, nine-time KO-D 6-Man Tag Team Champion, three-time Ironman Heavymetalweight Champion and former three-time DDT Universal Champion. Sasaki has also made several appearances for in United States and New Japan Pro-Wrestling (NJPW), working in the promotion's junior heavyweight division.

== Professional wrestling career ==
=== Early career (2005–2007) ===
Trained by Dick Togo, Sasaki made his professional wrestling debut on October 22, 2005, facing Yuki Sato at a Super Crew event, which was promoted by Togo and mainly featured his trainees facing each other in matches. In early 2006, Sasaki took part in Kaientai Dojo's 2006 K-Metal League, where he won two of his five matches and failed to advance to the finals. In June 2006, Sasaki left for a year-long learning excursion to Mexico, during which he wrestled for promotions such Alianza Universal de Lucha Libre (AULL), Consejo Mundial de Lucha Libre (CMLL) and International Wrestling Revolution Group (IWRG).

=== DDT Pro-Wrestling (2007–present) ===
After returning from Mexico, Sasaki made DDT Pro-Wrestling his new home promotion, debuting on December 30, 2007, when he and Choun Shiryu were defeated in a tag team match by Kudo and Yasu Urano. Wrestling several opening matches from the beginning of 2008, Sasaki picked up his first win in DDT on March 9, when he and Masami Morohashi defeated Rion Mizuki and Yukihiro Abe, with Sasaki submitting Mizuki for the win. On August 8, Sasaki defeated eight other men in a Royal Rumble match to become the 2008 King of Stockholm.

On October 13, Sasaki was renamed "Sasaki & Gabbana", when he joined his trainer Dick "Francesco" Togo's Italian Four Horsemen stable, with him, Togo and Antonio Honda defeating Kota Ibushi, Kudo and Masa Takanashi in the group's revival match. On September 13, 2009, Sasaki & Gabbana entered the Young Drama Cup. After winning all four of his matches, Sasaki made it to the finals of the tournament, where, on October 25, he was defeated by Keisuke Ishii. On December 13, Sasaki received his first shot at the KO-D Tag Team Championship, when he and Antonio Honda unsuccessfully challenged Kudo and Yasu Urano for the title in a three-way match, which also included Hikaru Sato and Masa Takanashi. After eighteen months of wrestling together, the Italian Four Horsemen disbanded on April 21, 2010, when Sasaki, Honda and Togo defeated Kenny Omega, Kota Ibushi and Kudo in a six-man tag team match. Afterwards, Sasaki returned to working under his real name. On August 8, Sasaki defeated Keisuke Ishii in the finals of a four-man tournament to become the number one contender to DDT's top title, the KO-D Openweight Championship. He then went on to unsuccessfully challenge Harashima for the title on August 29. On October 8, 2010, Sasaki made his debut for New Japan Pro-Wrestling (NJPW), losing to Tama Tonga at NEVER.3, an event which was part of NJPW's new NEVER project, which focused on young up-and-coming workers and wrestlers not signed to the promotion. A month later at NEVER.4, Sasaki was defeated by Tomohiro Ishii.

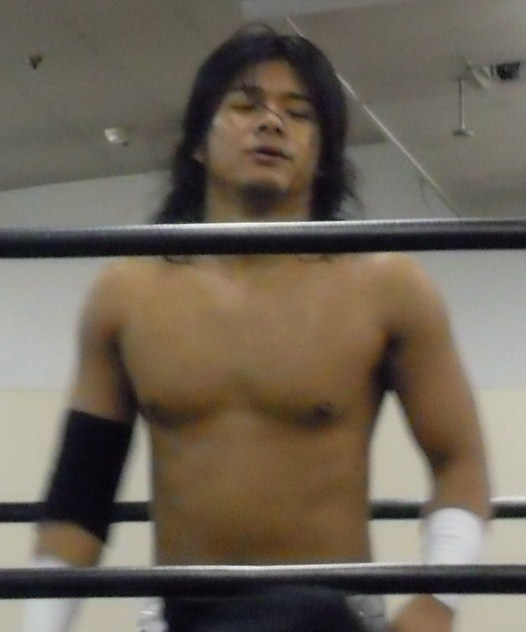
Sasaki in October 2010

On November 14, Sasaki won his first title in DDT, when he and Antonio Honda defeated Danshoku Dino and Shiro Koshinaka for the KO-D Tag Team Championship. The former Italian Horsemen, now known as "From the Northern Country", named after Sasaki's favorite television program, made their first successful title defense on November 28, defeating Gentaro and Yasu Urano, and followed that up by also defeating Soma Takao and Tomomitsu Matsunaga for the title on December 12. After another successful title defense against Mikami and Onryo on January 16, 2011, Sasaki and Honda lost the KO-D Tag Team Championship to Gentaro and Yasu Urano on February 20, ending their reign at 98 days.

Sasaki returned to NJPW on February 24 at NEVER.5, where he was defeated by Ryusuke Taguchi. On April 7 at NEVER.6, Sasaki picked up his first NJPW win, when he defeated Shinichiro Tominaga in the first round of the Road to the Super Jr. 2Days Tournament. The following day, Sasaki first defeated Ryuichi Sekine in the semifinals and then Tsuyoshi Kikuchi in the finals to win the tournament and earn a spot in the 2011 Best of the Super Juniors tournament. On April 19 at New Japan Brave 2011, Sasaki wrestled on his first NJPW main card match, when he teamed with fellow DDT workers Kenny Omega and Kota Ibushi to defeat Kushida, Prince Devitt and Ryusuke Taguchi in a six-man tag team match. On May 26, Sasaki entered the 2011 Best of the Super Juniors tournament. When the tournament ended two weeks later, Sasaki finished last in his round-robin block, having lost seven matches and picked up his only win against Gedo.

On June 19, Sasaki took part in Dick Togo's DDT farewell match, where he and Yasu Urano were defeated by Togo and Antonio Honda. On July 3, Sasaki won the Ironman Heavymetalweight Championship, surprising Antonio Honda after a match and pinning him for the title, taking advantage of the rule, where the title could be challenged for anytime and anywhere. He would lose the title back to Honda later that same day. Sasaki would regain the title from Honda on July 10 in a three-way match, which also included Tsuyoshi Kikuchi, but lost the title to Kikuchi immediately after the match. Sasaki won the title for the third time on July 21 and lost it to Honda in a Royal Rumble match three days later. The storyline around the Ironman Heavymetalweight Championship effectively ended the partnership between Sasaki and Honda, after which Sasaki joined the DDT Seikigun ("regular army") and began teaming regularly with Masa Takanashi. On January 8, 2012, Sasaki teamed with Takanashi, Keisuke Ishii and Shigehiro Irie to defeat the Crying Wolf stable of Antonio Honda, Keita Yano, Yasu Urano and Yuji Hino in an eight-man tag team match, pinning Urano for the win and handing Crying Wolf their first ever loss. As a result, Sasaki and Takanashi were granted a shot at Urano's and Hino's KO-D Tag Team Championship, but failed in their title challenge on January 22.

Sasaki returned to NJPW on May 27, when he entered the 2012 Best of the Super Juniors tournament. Sasaki managed to pick up wins against Hiromu Takahashi and Jado, but lost his other six matches in the tournament and finished seventh out of the nine wrestlers in his block. On June 16 NJPW's Dominion 6.16 pay-per-view, Sasaki teamed with Kenny Omega and Kota Ibushi to defeat Bushi, Prince Devitt and Kushida in a six-man tag team match. Back in DDT, Sasaki and Masa Takanashi received a shot at the KO-D Tag Team Championship on June 24, but were defeated by the defending champions, Homoiro Clover Z representatives Kudo and Makoto Oishi. On July 8, Sasaki and Takanashi joined Antonio Honda, Hoshitango, Yasu Urano and Yuji Hino to form the Monster Army. On July 19, Sasaki made another appearance for NJPW as part of a build-up to a match between Kota Ibushi and IWGP Junior Heavyweight Champion Low Ki. In the match, Sasaki and Ibushi were defeated by Ki and Jado, with Ki pinning Sasaki for the win. The Monster Army wrestled its first match together on July 22, when they were defeated by Akito, DJ Nira, Poison Julie Sawada, Rion Mizuki and Tetsuya Endo in a ten-man tag team match, after Hino and Hoshitango began brawling with each other. The brawling continued after the match with Sasaki and Takanashi siding with Hoshitango and Honda and Urano with Hino, which led to Takanashi announcing that the Monster Army was history and that he, Sasaki and Hoshitango were now known as "Familia". On August 18 at DDT's 15th anniversary event in Nippon Budokan, Sasaki, Takanashi, Hoshitango, Tetsuya Endo and Tsukasa Fujimoto, representing Familia, defeated Antonio Honda, Tanomusaku Toba, Yasu Urano, Yoshiko and Yuji Hino, representing Crying Wolf, in a ten-person tag team match, contested under "Soccer rules". On August 26, DDT General Manager Amon Tsurumi ordered all stables in the promotion disbanded, effectively ending the short-lived Familia. On September 9, Sasaki, along with Antonio Honda and Yasu Urano, traveled to La Paz, Bolivia, to take part in Dick Togo's retirement match; an eight-man elimination tag team match, where the four were defeated by Ajayu, Apocalipsis, Guerrero Ayar and Halcon Dorado.

On September 19, Sasaki and Antonio Honda turned on their respective tag team partners Masa Takanashi and Yasu Urano and formed a new stable named "Los Calientes" with Hoshitango. Four days later, Sasaki returned to NJPW, losing to Low Ki at the Destruction pay-per-view. On September 30, Los Calientes faced off with Masa Takanashi's new stable, formed with Toru Owashi and Yuji Hino in a six-man tag team grudge match. During the match, Hino turned on Takanashi, handing Los Calientes the win and reforming the Monster Army with Sasaki, Honda and Hoshitango, with Honda claiming that Takanashi and Urano were the ones who ruined the original stable. On November 15, Sasaki returned to NJPW, entering the NEVER Openweight Championship tournament, from which he was eliminated after losing to Tomohiro Ishii in his first round match. DDT's 2012 ended with a storyline, where Sanshiro Takagi brought in the NJPW tag team of Hiroyoshi Tenzan and Satoshi Kojima to stop the Monster Army, in particular Antonio Honda, who had begun stealing other wrestlers' clothes. At the final event of the year on December 23, the entire Monster Army was defeated in a four-on-three handicap match by Takagi, Tenzan and Kojima, after which Sasaki, Honda, Hino and Hoshitango were all supposedly arrested by the NJPW duo. On January 27, 2013, Sasaki, Hino and Honda defeated Team Drift (Keisuke Ishii, Shigehiro Irie and Soma Takao) to win the KO-D 6-Man Tag Team Championship. They made their first successful title defense on March 20 against the team of Danshoku Dino, Gabai-Ji-chan and Makoto Oishi. On April 13, the Monster Army made another successful title defense against Dino, Oishi and Alpha Female. On April 21, Sasaki defeated Yasu Urano in a singles match and, as a result, took over his "Right to Challenge Anytime, Anywhere" contract, which gave him the right to challenge for the KO-D Openweight Championship anytime and anywhere he wanted to. As the contract was on the line in every match its holder took part in, Sasaki entered a storyline, where he began attacking referees whenever he was close to losing a match, causing a disqualification, which would cost him the match, but save the contract. On May 26, the Monster Army lost the KO-D 6-Man Tag Team Championship to Golden☆Rendezvous～ (Gota Ihashi, Kenny Omega and Kota Ibushi) in their third defense. Sasaki finally cashed in his "Right to Challenge Anytime, Anywhere" contract on June 23, but was defeated in the match for the KO-D Openweight Championship by the defending champion, Shigehiro Irie, after the interfering Monster Army was taken out of the equation by Irie's Team Drift stablemates Keisuke Ishii and Soma Takao. On June 28, Sasaki earned the final spot in the annual King of DDT tournament by winning an eight-man battle royal. He entered the tournament later that same event, defeating Soma Takao in his first round match. On July 6, Sasaki was eliminated from the tournament in the second round by Kenny Omega. In mid-2013, Sasaki and Honda once again began stealing clothes from other wrestlers, resuming the storyline from the previous year. This built to an eight-man tag team match on August 17, during the first day of DDT's 16th anniversary weekend in Ryōgoku Kokugikan, where Sasaki, Honda, Hino and Hoshitango were defeated by their victims Akito, Kazuki Hirata, Masa Takanashi and Yukio Sakaguchi. On January 13, 2014, Sasaki and Honda attempted to regain the KO-D 6-Man Tag Team Championship with new partner Shoichi Uchida, but were defeated by the defending champions, Team Homo Sapiens (Aja Kong, Danshoku Dino and Makoto Oishi). On January 17, DDT announced that Sasaki had signed a contract to officially make DDT his home promotion, ending his days as a freelancer. On February 23, after Sasaki, Antonio Honda and Hoshitango were defeated by Mikami, Sanshiro Takagi and Toru Owashi in a six-man tag team match, Honda announced that the Monster Army had decided to disband. On March 9, Sasaki won the Ironman Heavymetalweight Championship for the fourth time by attacking Kazuki Hirata before his title defense. He then went on to lose it to DJ Nira later that same event. On March 21, at Judgement 2014, Monster Army wrestled its final match together, where Sasaki, Honda, Hino and Hoshitango defeated Gorgeous Matsuno, Gota Ihashi, Sanshiro Takagi and Toru Owashi.

On March 30, Sasaki announced he wanted to form a new partnership with Kenny Omega and Kota Ibushi. Omega and Ibushi accepted Sasaki's proposal, which led to a six-man tag team match, where the three defeated Kazuki Hirata, Sanshiro Takagi and Toru Owashi, with Sasaki pinning Hirata for the win and in the process taking over his "Right to Challenge Anytime, Anywhere" contract. Post-match, the new trio was named the next challengers for the KO-D 6-Man Tag Team Championship, which led to Omega and Ibushi naming Sasaki the official fourth member of their Golden☆Rendezvous～ stable. On April 5, Sasaki lost his contract to Shigehiro Irie in a tag team match, where he and Ibushi were defeated by Irie and Keisuke Ishii. On April 12, Sasaki, Omega and Ibushi defeated Team Drift to become the new KO-D 6-Man Tag Team Champions. They made their first successful title defense on April 29 against Danshoku Dino, Makoto Oishi and Yoshihiko. On May 4, Sasaki, Omega and Ibushi lost the title to Shuten-dōji (Kudo, Masa Takanashi and Yukio Sakaguchi) in their second defense, ending their reign at just 22 days. Despite losing the title, Sasaki, Omega and Ibushi decided to stay together and on May 11 revealed their unit's new name; Golden☆Storm Riders. The formation of the unit led to Ibushi and Omega's old associate Gota Ihashi breaking away from the two, renaming himself "Darth Gota" and forming a new partnership with Michael Nakazawa and Tomomitsu Matsunaga. On May 29, the two groups faced off in a six-man tag team match, where Sasaki pinned Ihashi for the win and, as per pre-match stipulation, forced his new stable to disband after only one match together. After the match, Ihashi re-joined Ibushi, Omega and Sasaki, turning Golden☆Storm Riders into a four-man stable. On August 2, Ihashi turned on Sasaki and re-joined Nakazawa and Matsunaga, starting a feud between the Golden☆Storm Riders and his new Booing stable. Later in the year, after Kenny Omega had left DDT for NJPW, Sasaki and Ibushi started a match series to find a new member for the Golden☆Storm Riders. The series ended on December 23 with rookie Suguru Miyatake being chosen as Omega's replacement. The new Golden☆Storm Riders received a shot at the KO-D 6-Man Tag Team Championship on January 3, 2015, but were defeated by the defending champions, Gorgeous Matsuno and the Brahman Brothers (Kei and Shu).

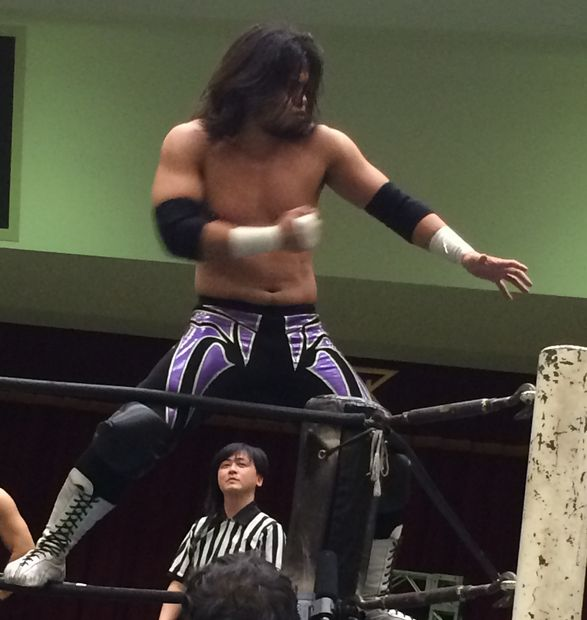
Sasaki in January 2015

In April, Sasaki began feuding with Akito over the DDT Extreme Championship. After the two wrestled to a 30-minute time limit draw in a non-title match on April 11, Akito announced that the title match between the two would be contested in a 60-minute Iron Man match. The title match on April 19 originally ended in a 2–2 draw, resulting in a sudden death extra time, where Akito retained his title. Afterwards, Sasaki entered a storyline, where he began collecting the numerous "Right to Challenge Anytime, Anywhere" contracts spread out among the DDT roster. By May 17 Sasaki possessed three contracts, a "Right to Challenge Anytime, Anywhere Triple Crown", which earned him three separate opportunities to challenge for the KO-D Openweight Championship anytime and anywhere, but instead of cashing them in, he chose to continue chasing the fourth and final contract. However, on May 24, Sasaki lost all three of his contracts; one to Kudo and two to Danshoku Dino. On May 31, the Golden☆Storm Riders received another shot at the KO-D 6-Man Tag Team Championship, but were defeated by Team Drift. On June 14, Sasaki scored a major win, when he defeated stablemate Kota Ibushi in the second round of the 2015 King of DDT tournament. He was eliminated from the tournament in the semifinals on June 28 by Konosuke Takeshita. On August 23 at Ryogoku Peter Pan, DDT's biggest event of the year, Sasaki and Ibushi defeated Daisuke Sekimoto and Yuji Okabayashi to win the KO-D Tag Team Championship.

On September 7, upon returning from wrestling in Vietnam, Sasaki debuted a new finishing maneuver, Vietnam Driver II, using it to pin new KO-D Openweight Champion Yukio Sakaguchi in a tag team match. This led to a match on September 27, where Sasaki unsuccessfully challenged Sakaguchi for his title. On November 2, Sasaki and Ibushi vacated the KO-D Tag Team Championship, when Ibushi was sidelined indefinitely with a cervical disc herniation. On November 18, Sasaki, Yuki Sato and Yusuke Kubo held a special event to celebrate their tenth anniversary in professional wrestling. In the main event, Sasaki successfully defended his newly won Chilean Max Lucha Libre Championship against Sato. On March 21, 2016, at DDT's 19th anniversary event, Sasaki and Shuji Ishikawa defeated Konosuke Takeshita and Tetsuya Endo to win the KO-D Tag Team Championship.

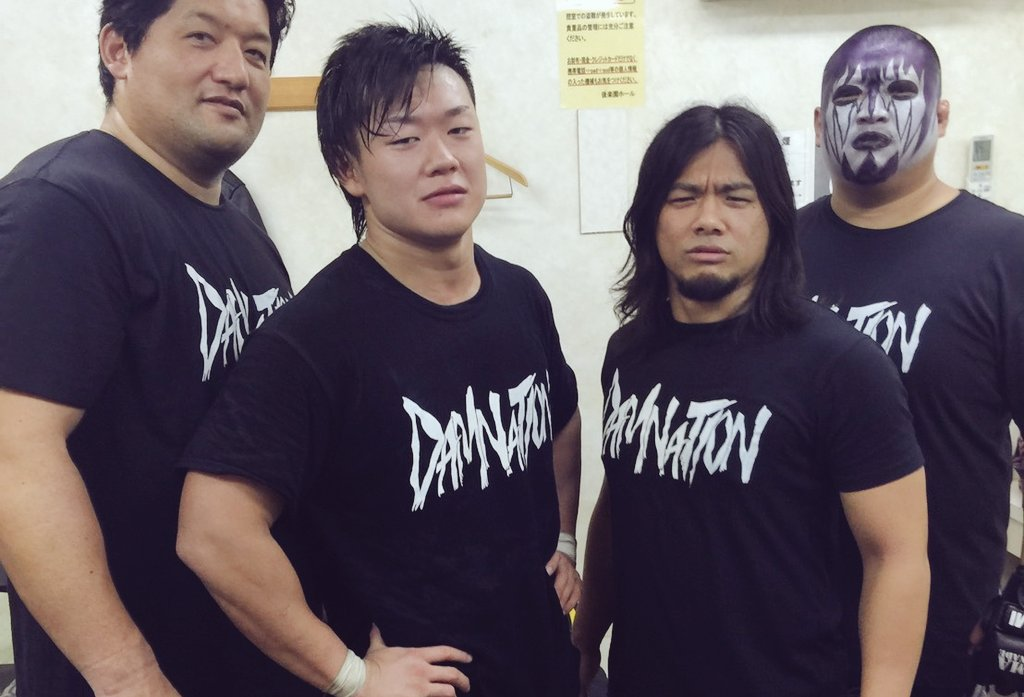
Sasaki as part of the Damnation stable in July 2016

On April 16, Sasaki submitted Antonio Honda in a tag team match, capturing his "Right to Challenge Anytime, Anywhere" contract in the process. He cashed in the contract on April 24, surprising Harashima after he had successfully defended the KO-D Openweight Championship against Kazusada Higuchi, and defeated him to win the title for the first time. Already holding the KO-D Tag Team Championship, the win made Sasaki a "double crown" champion. Sasaki lost the KO-D Openweight Championship to Konosuke Takeshita in his second defense on May 29. Afterwards, Sasaki announced he was planning to retire from professional wrestling. After three successful title defenses, Sasaki and Ishikawa lost the KO-D Tag Team Championship to Kai and Ken Ohka on July 3. Afterwards, Sasaki became the leader of the new Damnation stable, which also included Ishikawa, Mad Paulie and Tetsuya Endo. On August 6, Sasaki, Paulie and Endo defeated Shuten-dōji (Kota Umeda, Masahiro Takanashi and Yukio Sakaguchi) in a tournament final to win the vacant KO-D 6-Man Tag Team Championship. On September 25, Sasaki and Endo attempted to win another title, but were defeated by Harashima and Yuko Miyamoto in a match for the KO-D Tag Team Championship. On October 9, Sasaki and Endo defeated Harashima and Miyamoto in a rematch to become the new KO-D Tag Team Champions. They lost the title to Konosuke Takeshita and Mike Bailey in their second defense on December 4. On December 11, Damnation also lost the KO-D 6-Man Tag Team Championship in their second defense against Shuten-dōji (Kudo, Masahiro Takanashi and Yukio Sakaguchi). On January 29, 2017, Sasaki received a shot at the KO-D Openweight Championship, but was defeated by Harashima.

On March 20 at DDT's 20th anniversary event, Sasaki defeated Jun Kasai to win the DDT Extreme Championship for the first time. On August 20 at DDT's 20th anniversary show, Sasaki successfully defended the title against Akito in a Cabellera Contra Cabellera (Hair vs. Hair) match, forcing Akito to have his head shaved afterwards. On September 24, Sasaki took part in a three-way match, where he faced KO-D Openweight Champion Konosuke Takeshita and Independent World Junior Heavyweight Champion Ken Ohka with all three defending their titles. Sasaki won the match by submitting Ohka, retaining the Extreme Division Championship and winning the Independent World Junior Heavyweight Championship. Sasaki lost the Independent World Junior Heavyweight Championship back to Ohka on December 20. Ten days later, Sasaki lost the Extreme Division Championship to Yuko Miyamoto in his ninth defense at an event produced by Damnation.

Sasaki won King of DDT tournament by defeating Tetsuya Endo. At Ryogoku Peter Pan 2018, Sasaki defeated Danshoku Dino for KO-D Openweight Championship.

At DDT Judgement 2019 which was held on 17th Feb 2019 Sasaki lost his championship to Takeshita. Later on 5 April DDT is coming to America Sasaki regained the title by defeating Takeshita with 2 low blows and hurricana. Later on Endo cashed Gauntlet and defeated him in which Endo became KO-D Openweight championship for first time.

On March 20, 2020, at Judgement 2020: DDT 23rd Anniversary, Sasaki defeated Chris Brookes to win his first DDT Universal Championship.

== Championships and accomplishments ==
- Dramatic Dream Team / DDT Pro-Wrestling

- O-40 Championship (1 time, current)
- DDT Extreme Championship (1 time)
- DDT Universal Championship (3 times)
- Independent World Junior Heavyweight Championship (1 time)
- Ironman Heavymetalweight Championship (5 times)
- KO-D 6-Man Tag Team Championship (9 times, current) – with Antonio Honda and Yuji Hino (1), Kenny Omega and Kota Ibushi (1), Mad Paulie and Tetsuya Endo (1), Minoru Fujita and MJ Paul (1), and MJ Paul and Kanon (3) and Hideki Okatani and Ilusion (2)
- KO-D 10-Man Tag Team Championship (1 time, current) – with Demus 3:16, Hideki Okatani, MJ Paul and Ilusion
- KO-D Openweight Championship (3 times)
- KO-D Tag Team Championship (7 times) – with Antonio Honda (1), Kota Ibushi (1), Shuji Ishikawa (1), Tetsuya Endo (1), Soma Takao (1), MJ Paul (1) and Kanon (1)
- King of DDT Tournament (2018)
- King of Stockholm (2008)
- KO-D 6-Man Tag Team Championship Tournament (2016) – with Mad Paulie and Tetsuya Endo
- KO-D Openweight Next Challenger Tournament (2010)
- Hanami King Of Drunk Preliminary Rumble - with - Mao

- Japan Indie Awards

- Best Unit Award (2016, 2017) Damnation with Mad Paulie, Shuji Ishikawa and Tetsuya Endo

- Max Lucha Libre

- Max Maximo Championship (1 time)

- New Japan Pro-Wrestling

- Road to the Super Jr. 2Days Tournament (2011)

- Pro Wrestling Illustrated

- Ranked No. 161 of the top 500 singles wrestlers in the PWI 500 in 2020

=== Luchas de Apuestas record ===
Winner (wager)	Loser (wager)	Location	Event	Date	Notes
Daisuke Sasaki (hair)	Akito (hair)	Tokyo, Japan	Ryōgoku Peter Pan 2017	August 20, 2017	(Note: This match was also contested for Sasaki's DDT Extreme Championship.)
