= Keisuke Ishii =

Japanese professional wrestler

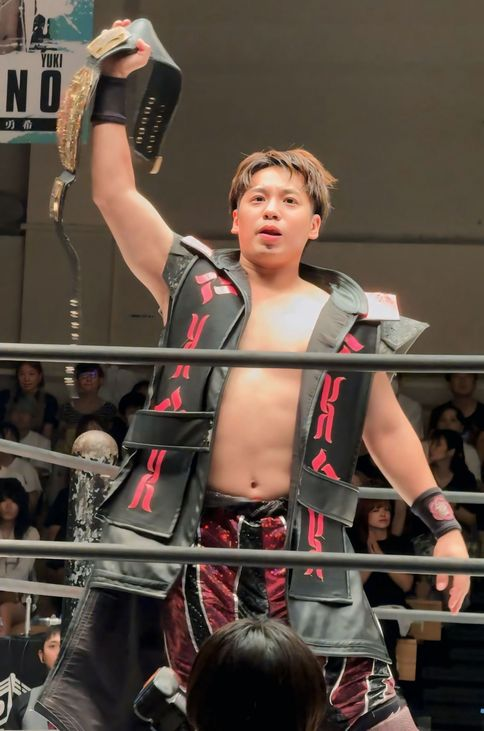
- Ishii in July 2024

Personal information
- Born: February 6, 1985 (age 41) Iruma, Saitama, Japan

Professional wrestling career
- Ring name(s): Keisuke Ishii; Circle K-Suke; Super Doctor K-Suke
- Billed height: 1.71 m (5 ft 7 1/2 in)
- Billed weight: 80 kg (176 lb)
- Trained by: All Japan Pro Wrestling; DDT
- Debut: July 6, 2008

Keisuke Ishii (石井慧介, Ishii Keisuke; born February 6, 1985) is a Japanese professional wrestler trained by and signed to DDT Pro-Wrestling (DDT). Ishii also competes for All Japan Pro Wrestling (AJPW), where he is a former World Junior Heavyweight Champion.

== Professional wrestling career ==
=== DDT (2008–present) ===
After being denied a place in the All Japan dojo, Ishii instead began training with DDT, and made his debut on July 6, 2008, unsuccessfully challenging Daichi Kakimoto for the World Ōmori Championship. The following month, Ishii suffered an injury, leaving him unable to compete for several months. Ishii returned to active competition in January 2009, losing to Yasu Urano. On April 18, Ishii achieved his first professional win, teaming with Kudo to defeat Taka Michinoku and Daisuke Sasaki. In September, Ishii took part in the Young Drama Cup, winning his block with 7 points and advancing to the final, where he once again defeated Sasaki. Ishii made his first challenge for the KO-D Tag Team Championship in November, teaming with Danshoku Dino in a loss to defending champions Kudo and Yasu Urano. Ishii took part in the 2010 King Of DDT tournament, defeating Tanomusaku Toba in the first round and Yago Azanable in the second, but lost to Harashima in the semi-finals. On June 13, Ishii teamed with Hikaru Sato and Yoshihiko to defeat Tokyo Gurentai (Nosawa, Mazada and Fujita) and win the UWA World Trios Championship. They lost the championships on July 25 in a triple threat match also featuring Kudo, Antonio Honda and Yasu Urano, as well as winners Great Kojika, Mr. #6 and Riho. Ishii debuted for New Japan Pro-Wrestling (NJPW) on October 8 at NEVER.3, defeating Hiromu Takahashi. On November 11, Ishii again defeated Takahashi at NEVER.4. In April 2011, Ishii took part in NJPW's Road to the Super Jr. 2Days Tournament, a 16-man, two day tournament where the two winners would receive a place in the Best of the Super Juniors tournament. Ishii defeated Takahashi in the first round, but lost to one of the eventual winners Taichi in the semi-final. On May 13, Ishii lost in NJPW for the first time, teaming with Shigehiro Irie in a loss to Tomoaki Honma and Tsuyoshi Kikuchi. On August 28, Ishii unsuccessfully challenged for the KO-D Openweight Championship, losing to Kudo.

==== Team Dream Futures/Team Drift (2012–present) ====
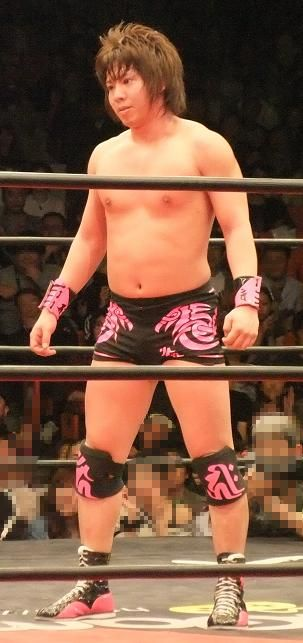
Ishii in 2011

On October 10, Ishii and Irie teamed up to win the vacant KO-D Tag Team Championship as Team Dream Futures, defeating Danshoku Dino and Makoto Oishi to win. Ishii and Irie successfully defended the championships against Yasu Urano and Antonio Honda on November 6, Gorgeous Matsuno and Poison Sawada Julie on November 27, and Dino and Oishi on December 11 but dropped the titles to Yuji Hino and Yasu Urano on December 31. Ishii and Irie unsuccessfully challenged Hino and Urano in a rematch on February 11, 2012. Ishii took part in the 2012 King Of DDT, defeating Soma Takao in the first round but losing to Kudo in the second. Ishii and Irie once again challenged for the KO-D Tag Team Championship on July 22, this time losing to Oishi and Kudo. On November 13, Ishii captured the DDT Extreme Championship at a Union Pro event, defeating Shuji Ishikawa in a lumberjack deathmatch. Ishii made his first successful defence on December 23, defeating Isami Kodaka and Urano. On January 12, 2013, Team Dream Futures, with new member Soma Takao captured the vacant KO-D 6-Man Tag Team Championship in the final of a tournament, defeating Akito, Oishi and Sanshiro Takagi. However, 2 days later, Ishii lost the DDT Extreme Championship to Isami Kodaka, and Team Dream Futures lost the KO-D 6-Man Titles to Monster Army (Yuji Hino, Antonio Honda and Daisuke Sasaki) on January 27. Ishii and Irie unsuccessfully challenged Harashima and Yasu Urano for the KO-D Tag Team Championship on March 31. Ishii also unsuccessfully challenged long time partner Irie for the KO-D Openweight Championship on June 23. Ishii and Takao became #1 contenders to the KO-D Tag Team Championship on August 18, but were unable to defeat champions Isami Kodaka and Yuko Miyamoto on September 29. Ishii again unsuccessfully challenged Kodaka and Miyamoto for the KO-D Tag Team Championships in December, this time with Irie as his partner. On February 2, 2014, Ishii faced Harashima in a 2/3 falls match for the DDT Extreme Championship, losing 2 falls to 1. However, on February 23, Team Dream Futures captured the KO-D 6-Man Championship once again, defeating The Homo-sapiens (Aja Kong, Dino and Oishi). The trio dropped the titles to Sasaki, Kenny Omega and Kota Ibushi in April. Ishii participated in the 2014 King Of DDT, being eliminated in the first round by Ibushi. On August 17, Team Drift captured the KO-D Tag Team Championship once again, defeating Shuten-Doji (Kudo, Masa Takanashi and Yukio Sakaguchi). On September 13, Ishii again unsuccessfully challenged for the KO-D Openweight Championship, losing to Harashima. Team Drift dropped the 6-Man Tag Team Championships to T2Hii (Kazuki Hirata, Sanshiro Takagi and Toru Owashi) on September 28, but captured them once again on March 1, 2015, defeating Shuten-Doji, but then dropped the titles back to Shuten-Doji on March 23. They again defeated Shuten-Doji to recapture the belts on April 11. This time, they held the belts until September, dropping them to #OhkaEmpire (Ken Ohka, Dino and Super Sasadango Machine). On May 15, 2016, they won the titles again, defeating Shunma Katsumata, Kazusada Higuchi and Kouki Iwasaki. They were forced to vacate the titles on May 29. Ishii entered the tournament to crown the new champions on July 23 alongside Dino and Super Sasadango Machine, but was eliminated in the first round by New Wrestling Aidoru (Katsumata, Mao and Oishi).

=== All Japan Pro Wrestling (2007, 2013–present) ===
In 2007, Ishii took part in a public tryout held by Keiji Mutoh, where the people who passed would be considered for a place in the AJPW dojo. Ishii passed the tryout, but was not selected to train in the dojo. In late 2013, Ishii returned to AJPW, and on October 27 unsuccessfully challenged Burning (Kotaro Suzuki and Atsushi Aoki) for the All Asia Tag Team Championship alongside Irie. Ishii made it to the final of the Gaora TV Championship tournament, but lost to Sushi. In March 2014, Ishii once again challenged for the All Asia Tag Team Championship, this time teaming with Takao, but the duo were defeated by Jun Akiyama and Yoshinobu Kanemaru. In April, Ishii captured the championships alongside Irie on his third attempt, defeating Akiyama and Kanemaru at a DDT event. They held the titles for four months, before losing them to Xceed (Kento Miyahara and Suzuki). In October, Ishii and Takao took part in the 2014 Junior Tag Battle Of Glory tournament, making it the playoffs where they were eliminated by Evolution (Aoki and Hikaru Sato). In February 2015, Ishii took part in the Junior Battle Of Glory tournament, finishing with 5 points and not advancing to the final. On May 21, Ishii unsuccessfully challenged Suzuki for the World Junior Heavyweight Championship. After appearing sporadically in All Japan for over a year, Ishii captured the World Junior Heavyweight Championship from Takao on November 27. Ishii made his first successful defence of the championship on January 3, defeating Yuma Aoyagi. He lost the title to Hikaru Sato on April 28.

== Championships and accomplishments ==
- All Japan Pro Wrestling

- All Asia Tag Team Championship (1 time) – with Shigehiro Irie
- World Junior Heavyweight Championship (1 time)

- DDT Pro-Wrestling

- DDT Extreme Championship (1 time)
- GWC 6-Man Tag Team Championship (1 time) – with Kouki Iwasaki and Harukaze
- Independent World Junior Heavyweight Championship (2 times)
- Ironman Heavymetalweight Championship (6 times)
- KO-D 6 Man Tag Team Championship (6 times) – with Shigehiro Irie and Soma Takao
- KO-D Tag Team Championship (1 time) – with Shigehiro Irie
- Kōkū-kōen Park Town Championship (1 time, current)
- UWA World Trios Championship (1 time) – with Hikaru Sato and Yoshihiko
- Young Drama Cup (2009)

- Ganbare☆Pro-Wrestling

- Spirit of Ganbare World Openweight Championship (1 time)

- Pro Wrestling Illustrated

- PWI ranked him #274 of the top 500 singles wrestlers in the PWI 500 in 2017
