= Judgement 2024 =

2024 DDT Pro-Wrestling event

- Promotional poster featuring Yuki Ueno and Harashima
- Promotion: CyberFight
- Brand: DDT Pro-Wrestling
- Date: March 17, 2024
- City: Tokyo, Japan
- Venue: Korakuen Hall
- Attendance: 1,491

Event chronology
← Previous; Into The Fight 2024	Next → Wrestle Peter Pan 2024

Judgement chronology
← Previous; 2023	Next → 2025

Judgement 2024: 27th Anniversary 5-Hour Special (Japanese: Judgement2024〜旗揚げ27周年記念大会5時間スペシャル〜, Hepburn: Jajjimento 2024 Hataage 27-shūnen Kinentaikai 5-jikan Supesharu) was a professional wrestling event promoted by CyberFight's DDT Pro-Wrestling (DDT). It took place on March 17, 2024, in Tokyo, Japan, at the Korakuen Hall. It was the 28th event under the Judgement name and the 12th to take place at the Korakuen Hall. The event aired domestically on Fighting TV Samurai and globally on CyberFight's video-on-demand service Wrestle Universe.

Thirteen matches were contested at the event, including three on the pre-show. The main event saw Yuki Ueno defeat Harashima to retain the KO-D Openweight Championship. Other top matches included Mao defeating Takeshi Masada to retain the DDT Universal Championship, Burning (Tetsuya Endo and Yuki Iino) defeated New Period (Ryuki Honda and Yuma Anzai) to retain the KO-D Tag Team Championship, and Shunma Katsumata defeated Hideki Okatani in a Jungle of Pain deathmatch to retain the DDT Extreme Championship.

== Production ==
=== Background ===
Judgement is an event held annually around March by DDT Pro-Wrestling since 1997. It has been marking the anniversary of the promotion since the very first official event produced by DDT on March 25, 1997. Over the years, Judgement would become the biggest show of the year until 2009 when Peter Pan became the flagship event series.

=== Storylines ===
Judgement 2024 featured professional wrestling matches that involved different wrestlers from pre-existing scripted feuds and storylines. Wrestlers portrayed villains, heroes, or less distinguishable characters in the scripted events that built tension and culminate in a wrestling match or series of matches.

=== Event ===
The show started with three preshow bouts broadcast live on DDT's YouTube channel. In the first one Soma Takao defeated Tsubasa Suzuki in the latter's debut match. In the second one, To-y, Ilusion and Rukiya defeated Yuni, Yuya Koroku and Kazuma Sumi in six man tag team action. In the third one, Keisuke Ishii and Shinichiro Kawamatsu outmatched Toru Owashi and Gorgeous Matsuno in tag team action.

In the first main card bout, the bout between Super Sasadango Machine and Akito ended by a double knockout. Next up, Daisuke Sasaki, Kanon and MJ Paul defeated Chris Brookes, Masahiro Takanashi and Antonio Honda in six-man tag team action. In the sixth bout, Ken Ohka defeated Sanshiro Takagi in singles competition. The seventh bout saw All Japan Pro Wrestling's Shuji Ishikawa and Yoshitatsu picking up a victory against Kazusada Higuchi and Yukio Naya. In the eighth bout, Jun Akiyama, Danshoku Dino and Makoto Oishi defeated Kazuki Hirata, Naruki Doi and Shinya Aoki to secure the third consecutive defense of the KO-D 6-Man Tag Team Championship in that respective reign. Since losing, Hirata Doi and Aoki's unit of Zuncha Muscle Survivor had to disband. Next up, Shunma Katsumata defeated Hideki Okatani in a Jungle of Pain deathmatch to secure the first defense of the DDT Extreme Championship in that respective reign. After the bout concluded, Katsumata received a challenge from Pro Wrestling Noah's Hi69 via video. Next up, Tetsuya Endo and Yuki Iino defeated Ryuki Honda and Yuma Anzai to secure the first defense of the KO-D Tag Team Championship in that respective reign. After the bout concluded, Endo and Iino received a challenge from Jun Akiyama who was set to pick a tag partner for a match which was set to take place at April Fool 2024 on April 7. In the eleventh bout, Mao defeated Takeshi Masada by knockout to secure the sixth consecutive defense of the DDT Universal Championship in that respective reign. After the bout concluded, Mao announced Billie Starkz as his next challenger for the Universal title. In the semi main event, Konosuke Takeshita defeated Yuma Aoyagi in singles competition.

In the main event, Yuki Ueno defeated Harashima to secure the third consecutive defense of the KO-D Openweight Championship in that respective reign. After the bout concluded, Ueno nominated Akito as his next challenger.

== Results ==
No.	Results	Stipulations	Times
1^{P}	Soma Takao defeated Tsubasa Suzuki by pinfall	Singles match	9:01
2^{P}	Ilusion, Rukiya and To-y defeated Yuni, Yuya Koroku and Kazuma Sumi by pinfall	Six-man tag team match	9:26
3^{P}	Keisuke Ishii and Shinichiro Kawamatsu defeated Toru Owashi and Gorgeous Matsuno by pinfall	Tag team match	7:10
4	Super Sasadango Machine vs. Akito ended in a double knockout	Singles match	7:10
5	Damnation T.A (Daisuke Sasaki, MJ Paul and Kanon) defeated Schadenfreude International (Chris Brookes, Masahiro Takanashi and Antonio Honda) by pinfall	Six-man tag team match	11:21
6	Ken Ohka defeated Sanshiro Takagi by pinfall	Singles match	10:32
7	Yoshitatsu and Shuji Ishikawa defeated Kazusada Higuchi and Yukio Naya by pinfall	Tag team match	12:24
8	D・O・A (Jun Akiyama, Danshoku Dino and Makoto Oishi) (c) defeated Zuncha Muscle Survivor (Kazuki Hirata, Naruki Doi and Shinya Aoki) by pinfall	Title vs. Dissolution six-man tag team match for the KO-D 6-Man Tag Team Championship; Since Zuncha Muscle Survivor lost, they had to disband.	9:48
9	Shunma Katsumata (c) defeated Hideki Okatani by pinfall	Jungle of Pain deathmatch for the DDT Extreme Championship	13:38
10	Burning (Tetsuya Endo and Yuki Iino) (c) defeated New Period (Ryuki Honda and Yuma Anzai) by pinfall	Tag team match for the KO-D Tag Team Championship	16:57
11	Mao (c) defeated Takeshi Masada by knockout	Singles match for the DDT Universal Championship	4:22
12	Konosuke Takeshita defeated Yuma Aoyagi by pinfall	Singles match	19:16
13	Yuki Ueno (c) defeated Harashima by pinfall	Singles match for the KO-D Openweight Championship	22:50
(c) / – the champion(s) heading into the match; P / – the match was broadcast on the pre-show
