= Judgement 2022: DDT 25th Anniversary =

2022 DDT Pro-Wrestling event

- Promotional poster featuring various DDT wrestlers
- Promotion: CyberFight
- Brand: DDT Pro-Wrestling
- Date: March 20, 2022
- City: Tokyo, Japan
- Venue: Ryōgoku Kokugikan
- Attendance: 2,516
- Tagline: A Festival For All Wrestling Fans (Note: Japanese: すべてのプロレスファンへ贈る祭り, Hepburn: Subete no Puroresu Fan e Okuru Matsuri)

Event chronology
← Previous; Never Mind 2021	Next → Peter Pan 2022

Judgement chronology
← Previous; 2021	Next → 2023

Judgement 2022: DDT 25th Anniversary (Judgement2022～DDT旗揚げ25周年記念大会～, Jajimento 2022: DDT Hataage Nijūgo-shūnen Kinen Taikai) was a professional wrestling event promoted by CyberFight's DDT Pro-Wrestling (DDT). It took place on March 20, 2022, in Tokyo, Japan, at the Ryōgoku Kokugikan. It was the twenty-sixth event under the Judgement name and the fourth to take place at the Ryōgoku Kokugikan. The event aired domestically on Fighting TV Samurai and globally on CyberFight's video-on-demand service Wrestle Universe. It was the culmination of a two-day event, which began with the Grand Princess '22 event held by Tokyo Joshi Pro-Wrestling (TJPW) on March 19 at the same venue.

Eleven matches were contested at the event, including two on the pre-show, presented as "dark matches" even though they were broadcast on Wrestle Universe like the rest of the card. In the main event, Tetsuya Endo defeated Konosuke Takeshita to win the KO-D Openweight Championship. In other prominent matches, Calamari Drunken Kings (Chris Brookes and Masahiro Takanashi) defeated Disaster Box (Harashima and Naomi Yoshimura) to win the KO-D Tag Team Championship; Mao defeated Daisuke Sasaki and Jun Kasai in a hardcore three-way match to win the DDT Universal Championship; Sanshiro Takagi defeated Michael Nakazawa in a No Disqualification "I'm sorry" match; and the team of Poison Sawada Julie, Gentaro, Mikami, Takashi Sasaki and Thanomsak Toba defeated the DDT Variety Team (Toru Owashi, Antonio Honda, Kazuki Hirata and Yoshihiko) in a 5-on-4 handicap match to win the KO-D 10-Man Tag Team Championship in the opening bout. The event also saw the retirement match and retirement ceremony of LiLiCo, as well as the announcement of an official partnership between DDT and All Elite Wrestling (AEW).

== Production ==
Other on-screen personnel
Role:	Name:
Japanese commentators	Haruo Murata (PPV)
Japanese commentators	Kagehiro Osano (Pre-show and PPV)
Japanese commentators	Sayoko Mita (Pre-show and PPV)
Japanese commentators	Ken Kato (Pre-show)
Japanese commentators	Rina Matsuki (Guest)
Japanese commentators	Lingling (Guest)
Japanese commentators	Yui Okada (Guest)
Japanese commentators	Kenta Kobashi (Guest)
English commentators	Baliyan Akki
English commentators	Hiroshi Arai
English commentators	Christelle Ciari
Ring announcers	Inoue Mic
Ring announcers	Kazunori Kosuge
Ring announcers	Ken Kato
Referees	Yukinori Matsui
Referees	Daisuke Kiso

=== Background ===
Judgement is an event held annually around March by DDT Pro-Wrestling since 1997. It has been marking the anniversary of the promotion since the very first official event produced by DDT on March 25, 1997. Over the years, Judgement would become the biggest show of the year until 2009 when Peter Pan became the flagship event series.

=== Storylines ===
Judgement 2022 featured professional wrestling matches that involved different wrestlers from pre-existing scripted feuds and storylines. Wrestlers portrayed villains, heroes, or less distinguishable characters in the scripted events that built tension and culminate in a wrestling match or series of matches.

On the January 3 special event, after defeating Shinya Aoki, Konosuke Takeshita was confronted by his longtime rival Tetsuya Endo, who asked to be the challenger for Takeshita's scheduled defense of the KO-D Openweight Championship in the main event of Judgement. The match was immediately made official by General Manager Hisaya Imabayashi.

The same day, as used to be tradition in the days of the KO-D Tag League, Disaster Box (Harashima and Naomi Yoshimura) vacated the KO-D Tag Team Championship ahead of the 2022 Ultimate Tag League so that the title would be put up for grab in the tournament. Harashima and Yoshimura went on to win the tournament on February 27, thus regaining their title. However, the tournament saw many matches being forfeited due to injuries, illness and COVID-19 protocols. Most notably, Harashima and Yoshimura's only loss in the tournament was at the hands of Calamari Drunken Kings (Chris Brookes and Masahiro Takanashi) who had to forfeit two of their four matches. After the final, Brookes and Takanashi challenged Harashima and Yoshimura to a title match at Judgement.

On the February 14 free show, Mao indicated his intention to challenge Daisuke Sasaki (whom he had pinned in the Ultimate Tag League) for the DDT Universal Championship. Sasaki initially accepted, but later in the show, Jun Kasai challenged Sasaki for the championship too as a rematch of their hardcore bout at Judgement 2017 that saw Sasaki win the DDT Extreme Championship. The match was then set up as a hardcore three-way match for the Universal title at Judgement.

On January 30, it was announced that Judgement 2022 would feature the retirement match of LiLiCo, a TV personality and former DDT Extreme, KO-D 10-Man Tag Team and Ironman Heavymetalweight Champion who had been involved with DDT since 2014, before she suffered a knee injury in 2018 that would prevent her to pursue an active wrestling career. On February 11, a press conference was held to announce the match would see LiLiCo teaming with her husband Ryohei Odai (of kayōkyoku band Junretsu fame) and Akito. They would be accompanied by the rest of Junretsu (Kazuyoshi Sakai, Yujiro Shirakawa and Shota Gogami) and they would face Pheromones (Danshoku "Dandy" Dino, Yuki "Sexy" Iino and Yumehito "Fantastic" Imanari).

On January 30, another announcement was made to reveal the mysterious wrestler from All Elite Wrestling (AEW) that would make an appearance at Judgement was Michael Nakazawa. In a pre-recorded video package, Nakazawa announced he would face DDT founder and CyberFight President Sanshiro Takagi, reigniting their long-time rivalry. On March 10, Takagi and Nakazawa gave a press conference during which Nakazawa attacked Takagi, hitting him with a laptop. Takagi challenged Nakazawa to a street fight in the days leading to Judgement. The match was held on March 15 in Shinjuku, near the Nakai Station, at the Inoo Book Store which was the setting for the first match of the Street Pro-Wrestling (路上プロレス, Rojō Puroresu) sub-brand in 2009. Nakazawa pinned Takagi and challenged him to a No Disqualification "I'm sorry" match at Judgement, hoping to make Takagi apologize for the numerous humiliations he put Nakazawa through throughout the years.

In December 2021, several wrestlers left Ice Ribbon to become independent wrestlers and Maya Yukihi had her contract modified to be a freelancer. Following the news, CyberFight announced the company was eager to bring Yukihi to DDT and Tokyo Joshi Pro-Wrestling (TJPW). Yukihi made her DDT debut on January 3, 2022, and quickly entered a rivalry with Saki Akai, the only permanent female member of the DDT roster.

In 2021, the KO-D 10-Man Tag Team Championship was turned into an 8-man tag team title to facilitate title defenses during the COVID-19 pandemic. On January 3, 2022, the title reverted to its original form but the champions at that time, Toru Owashi, Antonio Honda, Kazuki Hirata and Yoshihiko, had to keep defending the title as a four-man team against five-man teams. On January 30, it was announced that DDT original Poison Sawada Julie would assemble a team of DDT veterans to challenge for the title at Judgement. Alongside Sawada and his valet Naomi Suzan would be Akarangers (Takashi Sasaki and Gentaro) and Suicide Boyz (Mikami and Thanomsak Toba).

== Results ==
No.	Results	Stipulations	Times
1^{P}	Burning (Yusuke Okada and Yuya Koroku) and Ilusion defeated Tomomitsu Matsunaga, Toui Kojima and Yuki Ishida by pinfall	Six-man tag team match	11:00
2^{P}	Yuji Hino and Yukio Naya defeated Double Bridge (Tomohiko Hashimoto and Seiya Morohashi), Shota and Yasu Urano, Damnation T.A (Minoru Fujita and MJ Paul), Gorgeous Matsuno and Gota Ihashi, and Andreza Giant Panda and Super Sasadango Machine by pinfall	Tag team rumble rules battle royale	14:28
3	Poison Sawada Julie, Akarangers (Gentaro and Takashi Sasaki) and Suicide Boyz (Mikami and Thanomsak Toba) (with Naomi Suzan) defeated Toru Owashi, Antonio Honda, Kazuki Hirata and Yoshihiko (c) by pinfall	5-on-4 handicap match for the KO-D 10-Man Tag Team Championship	8:49
4	Saki Akai defeated Maya Yukihi by pinfall	Singles match	10:40
5	Sanshiro Takagi defeated Michael Nakazawa by pinfall	No Disqualification "I'm sorry" match	10:20
6	The 37Kamiina (Yuki Ueno and Shunma Katsumata) defeated Isami Kodaka and Yukio Sakaguchi by pinfall	Tag team match	11:02
7	Pheromones (Danshoku "Dandy" Dino, Yuki "Sexy" Iino and Yumehito "Fantastic" Imanari) defeated LiLiCo, Ryohei Odai and Akito (with Kazuyoshi Sakai, Yujiro Shirakawa and Shota Gogami) by pinfall	Six-person tag team match This was LiLiCo's retirement match.	16:52
8	Wild Burning (Jun Akiyama and Takao Omori) defeated Eruption (Kazusada Higuchi and Hideki Okatani) by pinfall	Tag team match	12:36
9	Mao defeated Daisuke Sasaki (c) and Jun Kasai by pinfall	Hardcore three-way match for the DDT Universal Championship	19:56
10	Calamari Drunken Kings (Chris Brookes and Masahiro Takanashi) defeated Disaster Box (Harashima and Naomi Yoshimura) (c) by pinfall	Tag team match for the KO-D Tag Team Championship	18:50
11	Tetsuya Endo defeated Konosuke Takeshita (c) by pinfall	Singles match for the KO-D Openweight Championship	46:30
(c) / – the champion(s) heading into the match; P / – the match was broadcast on the pre-show
