= Judgement 2026 =

2026 DDT Pro-Wrestling event

- Poster for the event featuring various wrestlers
- Promotion: CyberFight
- Brand: DDT Pro-Wrestling
- Date: March 22, 2026
- City: Tokyo, Japan
- Venue: Korakuen Hall

Event chronology
← Previous; Ultimate Party	Next → Wrestle Peter Pan

Judgement chronology
← Previous; 2025	Next → —

Judgement 2026: 29th Anniversary 5-Hour Special (Japanese: Judgement2026～旗揚げ29周年記念大会5時間スペシャル～, Hepburn: Jajjimento 2026 Hataage 29-shūnen Kinen Taikai 5-jikan Supesharu) was a professional wrestling event promoted by CyberFight's DDT Pro-Wrestling (DDT). It took place on March 22, 2026, in Tokyo, Japan, at the Korakuen Hall. It was the 30th event under the Judgement name and the 14th to take place at the Korakuen Hall. The event aired domestically on Fighting TV Samurai and globally on CyberFight's video-on-demand service Wrestle Universe.

== Production ==
=== Background ===
Judgement is an event held annually around March by DDT Pro-Wrestling since 1997. It has been marking the anniversary of the promotion since the very first official event produced by DDT on March 25, 1997. Over the years, Judgement would become the biggest show of the year until 2009 when Peter Pan became the flagship event series.

=== Storylines ===
Judgement 2026 featured professional wrestling matches that involved different wrestlers from pre-existing scripted feuds and storylines. Wrestlers portrayed villains, heroes, or less distinguishable characters in the scripted events that built tension and culminate in a wrestling match or series of matches.

At Hybrid Performer 2026 on February 22, Kazuma Sumi defeated Takeshi Masada in the final of the D Generations Cup, thus earning a DDT Universal Championship match against Daisuke Sasaki.

At the same Hybrid Performer event, it was announced that Kazuki Hirata would be seconded by John Robinson, a Japan-based Irish DJ, for his special singles match against Konosuke Takeshita. Robinson produced the 1994 Avex Trax single "Tokyo, Go!," which was first used as an entrance theme by Magnum Tokyo, and is now used by Hirata.

== Event ==
The event started with the singles confrontation between Hinata Kasai and Yuni, solded with the victory of the latter. Next up, Tokyo Joshi Pro-Wrestling's Himawari, Haru Kazashiro and Chika Nanase picked up a victory over Toga, Ren Konatsu and Shion Kanzaki. The third bout saw Jun Akiyama outmatch Rukiya in singles competition. Next up, Yuki Iino and Yukio Naya defeated Evil Uno and Akito in tag team competition. In the fifth bout, Viento Maligno and Kumadori picked up a victory over the teams of MJ Paul and Ilusion, and Makoto Oishi and Masami Inahata. Next up, Mao outmatched Shunma Katsumata in singles competition. The seventh bout saw Chris Brookes and Harashima defeat Shinya Aoki and Junta Miyawaki to become the number one contenders for the KO-D Tag Team Championship.

Next up, Hideki Okatani defeated To-y in a special stipulation hardcore bout to win the DDT Extreme Championship, ending the latter's reign at 280 days and seven defenses. After the bout concluded, Okatani was challenged by Yukio Naya. Next up, the six-on-one handicap match in which Minoru Suzuki defended the Ironman Heavymetalweight Championship was won by Hisaya Imabayashi's glasses by simply pinning Suzuki. Antonio Honda won the title moments after by breaking the pair of glasses. In the tenth bout, Takeshi Masada, Yuya Koroku and Daichi Satoh defeated Naomi Yoshimura, Ryota Nakatsu and Yuki Ishida to secure the first successful defense of the KO-D 6-Man Tag Team Championship in that respective reign. Next up, Konosuke Takeshita and Kazuki Hirata faced each other in three different bouts. After beating Hirata twice in quick fashion, their third match had the stipulation that Takeshita needed a 20-count for the win while Hirata only needed a 2-count. The latter won all three bouts. In the semi main event, Kazuma Sumi defeated Daisuke Sasaki to win the DDT Universal Championship, ending the latter's reign at 56 days and no defenses.

In the main event, Yuki Ueno defeated Kanon to secure the sixth consecutive defense of the KO-D Openweight Championship in that respective reign. After the bout concluded, Ueno was challenged by Yuki Iino.

== Results ==
No.	Results	Stipulations	Times
1^{P}	Yuni defeated Hinata Kasai by pinfall	Singles match	7:26
2^{P}	Himawari, Haru Kazashiro, and Chika Nanase defeated Toga, Ren Konatsu, and Shion Kanzaki by pinfall	Six-woman tag team match	9:53
3	Jun Akiyama defeated Rukiya by pinfall	Singles match	6:20
4	The Apex (Yuki Iino and Yukio Naya) defeated Evil Uno and Akito by pinfall	Tag team match	11:12
5	Viento Maligno and Kumadori defeated Damnation T.A. (MJ Paul and Ilusion), and Makoto Oishi and Masami Inahata by pinfall	Three-way tag team match	8:25
6	Mao defeated Shunma Katsumata by pinfall	Singles match	12:04
7	Fantômes Dramatic (Chris Brookes and Harashima) defeated Shinya Aoki and Junta Miyawaki by pinfall	Tag team match to determine the #1 contenders to the KO-D Tag Team Championship	12:33
8	Hideki Okatani defeated To-y (c) by pinfall	If You Want To Use The Bamboo Sword Make Them Laugh! Staring Contest Punishment Bamboo Sword Deathmatch for the DDT Extreme Championship	12:20
9	Sanshiro Takagi, Toru Owashi, Danshoku Dino, Super Sasadango Machine, Antonio Honda, Hisaya Imabayashi, and Hisaya Imabayashi's glasses (Note: Hisaya Imabayashi's glasses, who wasn't an official participant in this match, fell on Suzuki and pinned him to win the title.) defeated Minoru Suzuki (c) by pinfall	Six-on-one handicap match for the Ironman Heavymetalweight Championship	11:51
10	paleyouth (Takeshi Masada, Yuya Koroku, and Daichi Sato) (c) defeated Harimau (Naomi Yoshimura, Ryota Nakatsu, and Yuki Ishida) by pinfall	Six-man tag team match for the KO-D 6-Man Tag Team Championship	14:17
11	Konosuke Takeshita defeated Kazuki Hirata (with John Robinson) by submission	Singles match The match ended if Takeshita scored a 20-count pinfall on Hirata or Hirata scored a two-count pinfall on Takeshita.	9:19
12	Kazuma Sumi defeated Daisuke Sasaki (c) by pinfall	Singles match for the DDT Universal Championship	16:48
13	Yuki Ueno (c) defeated Kanon by pinfall	Singles match for the KO-D Openweight Championship	25:12
(c) / – the champion(s) heading into the match; P / – the match was broadcast on the pre-show
