= Judgement 2025 =

2025 DDT Pro-Wrestling event

- Promotional poster of the event
- Promotion: CyberFight
- Brand: DDT Pro-Wrestling
- Date: March 20, 2025
- City: Tokyo, Japan
- Venue: Korakuen Hall

Event chronology
← Previous; Ultimate Party 2024	Next → King of Kings

Judgement chronology
← Previous; 2024	Next → 2026

Judgement 2025: 28th Anniversary 5-Hour Special (Japanese: Judgement2025〜旗揚げ28周年記念大会5時間スペシャル〜, Hepburn: Jajjimento 2025 Hataage 28-shūnen Kinen Taikai 5-jikan Supesharu) was a professional wrestling event promoted by CyberFight's DDT Pro-Wrestling (DDT). It took place on March 20, 2025, in Tokyo, Japan, at the Korakuen Hall. It was the 29th event under the Judgement name and the 13th to take place at the Korakuen Hall. The event aired domestically on Fighting TV Samurai and globally on CyberFight's video-on-demand service Wrestle Universe.

The main event saw Chris Brookes successfully defending the KO-D Openweight Championship against Masahiro Takanashi.

== Production ==
=== Background ===
Judgement is an event held annually around March by DDT Pro-Wrestling since 1997. It has been marking the anniversary of the promotion since the very first official event produced by DDT on March 25, 1997. Over the years, Judgement would become the biggest show of the year until 2009 when Peter Pan became the flagship event series.

=== Storylines ===
Judgement 2025 featured professional wrestling matches that involved different wrestlers from pre-existing scripted feuds and storylines. Wrestlers portrayed villains, heroes, or less distinguishable characters in the scripted events that built tension and culminate in a wrestling match or series of matches.

=== Event ===
The event started with the six-man tag team confrontation between in which Shunma Katsumata, Yuni and Kazuma Sumi defeated Kazusada Higuchi, Ryota Nakatsu and Yuki Ishida to win the vacant KO-D 6-Man Tag Team Championship. Next up, Toru Owashi defeated Antonio Honda and Kazuki Hirata in three-way competition. The third bout saw MJ Paul and Ilusion outmatch JJ Furno and Tomomitsu Matsunaga in tag team competition. Next up, Yukio Naya, Yuya Koroku and Keigo Nakamura defeated Makoto Oishi, Akito and Soma Takao in six-man tag team competition. In the fifth bout, Harashima and Takeshi Masada picked up a victory over Jun Akiyama and Daichi Satoh. Next up, Super Sasadango Machine defeated Danshoku Dino to win the DDT Extreme Championship, ending the latter's reign at 151 days and two defenses. Next up, Daisuke Sasaki defeated Kanon in singles competition. In the eighth match, Fuminori Abe and Takuya Nomura defeated Mao and To-y to win the KO-D Tag Team Championship, ending the latter teams' reign at 82 days and one defense. In the semi main event, Minoru Suzuki defeated Yuki Ueno to win the DDT Universal Championship, ending the latters' reign at 53 days and no defenses.

In the main event, Chris Brookes defeated Masahiro Takanashi to secure the defense of the KO-D Openweight Championship in that respective reign.

== Results ==
No.	Results	Stipulations	Times
1	NωA Jr. (Shunma Katsumata, Yuni and Kazuma Sumi) defeated Harimau (Kazusada Higuchi, Ryota Nakatsu and Yuki Ishida) by pinfall	Six-man tag team match for the vacant KO-D 6-Man Tag Team Championship	11:29
2	Toru Owashi defeated Antonio Honda and Kazuki Hirata by pinfall	Three-way match	8:40
3	Damnation T.A. (MJ Paul and Ilusion) defeated JJ Furno and Tomomitsu Matsunaga by pinfall	Tag team match	7:23
4	Yukio Naya, Yuya Koroku and Keigo Nakamura defeated Makoto Oishi, Akito and Soma Takao by submission	Six-man tag team match	11:42
5	Harashima and Takeshi Masada defeated Jun Akiyama and Daichi Sato by pinfall	Tag team match	13:39
6	Super Sasadango Machine defeated Danshoku Dino (c) by pinfall	Loser Joins DDT match for the DDT Extreme Championship with Amon Tsurumi as a special observer As a result, Dino's dog, Haku, had to "join" DDT.	8:33
7	Daisuke Sasaki defeated Kanon by submission	Singles match	11:34
8	Astronauts (Fuminori Abe and Takuya Nomura) defeated The37Kamiina (Mao and To-y) (c) by submission	Tag team match for the KO-D Tag Team Championship	16:17
9	Minoru Suzuki defeated Yuki Ueno (c) by pinfall	Singles match for the DDT Universal Championship	23:32
10	Chris Brookes (c) defeated Masahiro Takanashi by pinfall	Singles match for the KO-D Openweight Championship	21:17
(c) / – the champion(s) heading into the match
