= Judgement 2023 =

2023 DDT Pro-Wrestling event

- Promotional poster featuring various DDT wrestlers
- Promotion: CyberFight
- Brand: DDT Pro-Wrestling
- Date: March 21, 2023
- City: Tokyo, Japan
- Venue: Korakuen Hall
- Attendance: 1,138

Event chronology
← Previous; Into The Fight 2023	Next → Mega Max Bump 2023

Judgement chronology
← Previous; 2022	Next → 2024

Judgement 2023: Longest 5-Hour Special in Korakuen History (Japanese: Judgement2023〜後楽園史上最長5時間スペシャル〜, Hepburn: Jajimento 2023: Kōrakuen Shijō Saichō Go-jikan Supesharu) was a professional wrestling event promoted by CyberFight's DDT Pro-Wrestling (DDT). It took place on March 21, 2023, in Tokyo, Japan, at the Korakuen Hall. It was the 27th event under the Judgement name and the 11th to take place at the Korakuen Hall. The event aired domestically on Fighting TV Samurai and globally on CyberFight's video-on-demand service Wrestle Universe.

Sixteen matches were contested at the event, including one on the pre-show, and five of DDT's nine championships were on the line. In the main event, Yuji Hino defeated Yukio Naya to retain the KO-D Openweight Championship. Other prominent matches saw ShunMao (Mao and Shunma Katsumata) defeat Harimau (Kazusada Higuchi and Ryota Nakatsu in a Falls count anywhere match to retain the KO-D Tag Team Championship, Tetsuya Endo defeated Naruki Doi to win the DDT Universal Championship, Jun Akiyama successfully defended the DDT Extreme Championship against Kotaro Suzuki, and Makoto Oishi won a three-way match to win the vacant O-40 Championship.

== Production ==
=== Background ===
Judgement is an event held annually around March by DDT Pro-Wrestling since 1997. It has been marking the anniversary of the promotion since the very first official event produced by DDT on March 25, 1997. Over the years, Judgement would become the biggest show of the year until 2009 when Peter Pan became the flagship event series.

=== Storylines ===
Judgement 2023 featured a total of sixteen professional wrestling matches that involved different wrestlers from pre-existing scripted feuds and storylines. Wrestlers portrayed villains, heroes, or less distinguishable characters in the scripted events that built tension and culminate in a wrestling match or series of matches.

On February 26, at Into The Fight, Yukio Naya defeated Harashima to become the #1 contender to Yuji Hino's KO-D Openweight Championship.

=== Event ===
The preshow included three matches and was broadcast on DDT's YouTube channel. In the first one, "DDTeeen" division competitors Ilusion and Munetatsu Nakamura defeated El Unicorn and Raimu Imai. El Unicorn unmasked after the bout concluded. In the second one, Yuya Koroku and Yuki Ishida outmatched Toui Kojima and Kazuma Sumi in tag team action. In the third bout, Keisuke Ishii and Soma Takao picked up a victory over Kazuki Hirata and Yoshihiko.

On the first main card bout, Makoto Oishi defeated Gorgeous Matsuno and Shinichiro Kawamatsu in three-way competition. Next up, the team of Pheromones (Yuki "Sexy" Iino, Danshoku "Dandy" Dino, Yumehito "Fantastic" Imanari and Koju "Shining Ball" Takeda) wrestled the Anti-Pheromones Task Force (Akito, Toru Owashi, Hiroshi Yamato and Yusuke Okada) into a no-contest. The sixth bout of the event saw Max the Impaler and Heidi Howitzer picking up a victory over Antonio Honda and Super Sasadango Machine in tag team competition. In the seventh bout, Saki Akai defeated Masahiro Takanashi in singles action. Next up, Harashima and Keigo Nakamura outmatched Yukio Sakaguchi and Hideki Okatani in tag team competition. In the ninth match, Takeshi Masada defeated Hikaru Machida in singles competition. Next up, Jun Akiyama defeated Kotaro Suzuki to secure the fourth consecutive defense of the DDT Extreme Championship in that respective reign. Next up, All Elite Wrestling's Konosuke Takeshita defeated Sanshiro Takagi in singles competition. The thirteenth bout saw Yuki Ueno picking up a victory over Samuray Del Sol in singles action. In the fourteenth bout, Tetsuya Endo defeated Naruki Doi to win the DDT Universal Championship, ending the latter's reign at 67 days and one successful defense. In the semi main event, Mao and Shunma Katsumata defeated Kazusada Higuchi and Ryota Nakatsu to secure the fourth consecutive defense of the KO-D Tag Team Championship in that respective reign.

In the main event, Yuji Hino defeated Yukio Naya to secure the first successful defense of the KO-D Openweight Championship in that respective reign.

== Results ==
No.	Results	Stipulations	Times
1^{P}	Ilusion and Munetatsu Nakamura defeated El Unicorn and Raimu Imai by pinfall	Tag team match	8:15
2^{P}	Yuya Koroku and Yuki Ishida defeated Toui Kojima and Kazuma Sumi by pinfall	Tag team match	9:02
3^{P}	Keisuke Ishii and Soma Takao defeated Kazuki Hirata and Yoshihiko by pinfall	Tag team match	10:39
4	Makoto Oishi defeated Gorgeous Matsuno and Shinichiro Kawamatsu by pinfall	Three-way match for the vacant O-40 Championship	4:54
5	Pheromones (Yuki "Sexy" Iino, Danshoku "Dandy" Dino, Yumehito "Fantastic" Imanari and Koju "Shining Ball" Takeda) vs. Anti-Pheromones Task Force (Akito, Toru Owashi, Hiroshi Yamato and Yusuke Okada) ended in a no-contest	Eight-man tag team match	11:21
6	Wasteland War Party (Max the Impaler and Heidi Howitzer) defeated Antonio Honda and Super Sasadango Machine by pinfall	Tag team match	7:46
7	Saki Akai defeated Masahiro Takanashi by pinfall	Singles match	9:19
8	Harashima and Keigo Nakamura defeated Eruption (Yukio Sakaguchi and Hideki Okatani) by pinfall	Tag team match	12:26
9	Takeshi Masada defeated Hikaru Machida by pinfall	Singles match	6:31
10	Damnation T.A (Daisuke Sasaki, MJ Paul and Kanon) defeated Chris Brookes, Drew Parker and Hagane Shinno by pinfall	Six-man tag team match	11:55
11	Jun Akiyama (c) defeated Kotaro Suzuki by pinfall	Singles match for the DDT Extreme Championship	10:48
12	Konosuke Takeshita defeated Sanshiro Takagi by referee's decision	Singles match	13:17
13	Yuki Ueno defeated Samuray Del Sol by pinfall	Singles match	13:28
14	Tetsuya Endo defeated Naruki Doi (c) by pinfall	Singles match for the DDT Universal Championship	20:49
15	ShunMao (Mao and Shunma Katsumata) (c) defeated Harimau (Kazusada Higuchi and Ryota Nakatsu) by pinfall	Falls count anywhere match for the KO-D Tag Team Championship	18:15
16	Yuji Hino (c) defeated Yukio Naya by pinfall	Singles match for the KO-D Openweight Championship	22:23
(c) / – the champion(s) heading into the match; P / – the match was broadcast on the pre-show
