= Burning (professional wrestling) =

Professional wrestling stable

- Logo of Burning's third incarnation

Stable
- Members: Tetsuya Endo; Yuya Koroku; Kotaro Suzuki; Yuki Iino
- Former members: See below
- Debut: First incarnation: August 1998; Second incarnation: 2000; Third incarnation: January 26, 2013; Fourth incarnation: December 26, 2021
- Disbanded: December 28, 2024
- Years active: 1998–2000; 2000–2012; 2013–2015; 2021–2024

Burning (バーニング, Bāningu; usually stylized in all capital letters as BURNING) was a multi-promotional professional wrestling stable originally formed in All Japan Pro Wrestling (AJPW) in August 1998.

The first incarnation of the group was founded primarily by co-leaders Jun Akiyama and Kenta Kobashi, and were later joined by Kentaro Shiga and Yoshinobu Kanemaru. Akiyama and Kobashi dominated AJPW's tag team ranks for the next two years, winning the World Tag Team Championship twice and the World's Strongest Tag Determination League also twice. In July 2000, Burning took part in a mass exodus led by Mitsuharu Misawa and left AJPW to join the newly founded Pro Wrestling Noah promotion, where it was rebuilt with Akiyama leaving the alliance and Kobashi taking several rookies under his wing. As representatives of Burning, Kobashi held the GHC Heavyweight Championship for two years and he and Tamon Honda won the GHC Tag Team Championship on two occasions, while the stable also launched the careers of Kenta and Go Shiozaki, both of whom eventually climbed to the top of the promotion. Eventually Kobashi's battle with kidney cancer and other various injuries led to the quiet dissolution of the stable.

Burning was reformed back in AJPW in January 2013, when original members Jun Akiyama and Yoshinobu Kanemaru and second incarnation member Go Shiozaki along with Atsushi Aoki and Kotaro Suzuki quit Pro Wrestling Noah and joined AJPW as a unit. The stable quickly began dominating the promotion, winning three titles and two tournaments within three months of its reformation. Despite the success, Aoki, Shiozaki and Suzuki all quit Burning before the end of 2013 to form their own new group. The stable was effectively dissolved when Kanemaru left AJPW at the end of 2015.

With the endorsement of Kenta Kobashi, the stable was reformed in DDT Pro-Wrestling in December 2021. This fourth incarnation was made of original member Jun Akiyama along with Yusuke Okada, Yuya Koroku and their new leader Tetsuya Endo.

== History ==
=== First incarnation (1998–2000) ===
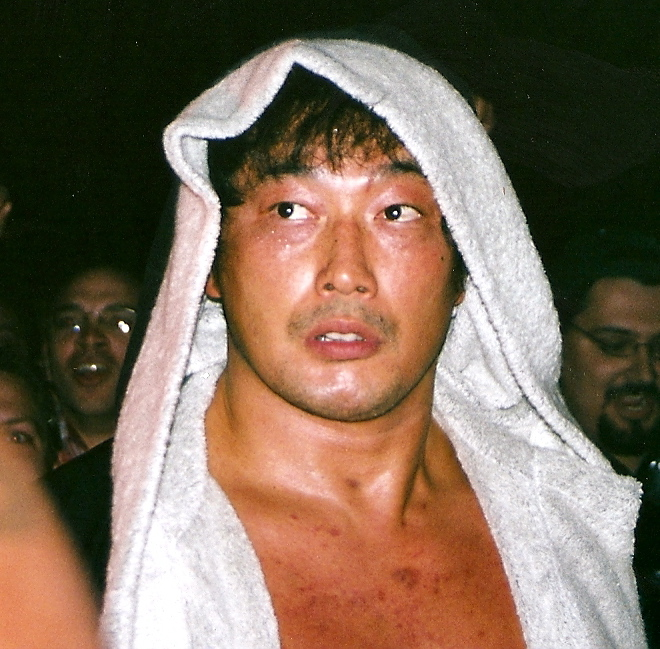
Kenta Kobashi, leader of the first two incarnations of Burning

In August 1998 in the All Japan Pro Wrestling (AJPW) promotion, Triple Crown Heavyweight Champion Kenta Kobashi's partnership with Johnny Ace came to an end and he formed a new partnership with Jun Akiyama, which was subsequently named "Burning". The duo was later also joined by Kentaro Shiga and Yoshinobu Kanemaru, turning Burning from a tag team into a stable. Together, Kobashi and Akiyama went on to become two-time World Tag Team Champions, while also winning back-to-back World's Strongest Tag Determination Leagues in 1998 and 1999. Through his affiliation with Kobashi and Akiyama, Kanemaru earned the reputation of being one of Japan's top younger wrestlers, winning Tokyo Sports's 1998 Rookie of the Year award, even though he had already debuted two years earlier. Burning remained together until July 2000, when Kobashi, Akiyama, Kanemaru and Shiga, along with several other wrestlers, all followed Mitsuharu Misawa out of AJPW, joining his new Pro Wrestling Noah promotion.

=== Second incarnation (2000–2012) ===
Following the jump to Noah, the original Burning split up and instead Kobashi took rookie wrestlers Kenta and Takeshi Rikio under his wing, while also forming new partnerships with veterans Tamon Honda and Tsuyoshi Kikuchi, forming the second incarnation of Burning. However, this version of Burning got off to a slow start, when Kobashi was forced to undergo surgeries on both his elbow and knees in early 2001. He eventually returned to the ring in February 2002, but during his return match tore his anterior cruciate ligament, which sidelined him for further five months. With his injuries behind for now, Kobashi led Burning to a storyline rivalry with former partner Jun Akiyama's new stable, Sternness. During 2002, Kentaro Shiga left Sternness to return to Burning and, on October 14, teamed with Kobashi and Kenta to win the One Day 6 Man Tag Tournament, defeating the Sternness trio of Jun Akiyama, Akitoshi Saito and Makoto Hashi in the finals. In March 2003, Kobashi won the GHC Heavyweight Championship, which he held for two full years, before losing it to Takeshi Rikio, who had now left Burning. In July 2004, Kobashi's newest trainee, Go Shiozaki, made his professional wrestling debut as a member of Burning, quickly establishing himself as a top heavyweight prospect. Meanwhile, Kobashi's number one protégé and Burning stablemate, Kenta, rose to the top of Noah's junior heavyweight division, winning the GHC Junior Heavyweight Championship in July 2005. Kobashi, teaming with another Burning stablemate Tamon Honda, also went on to become a two-time GHC Tag Team Champion, before being sidelined in June 2006 after being diagnosed with kidney cancer. Though Kobashi returned to in-ring action in December 2007, Burning had effectively been dissolved during the past year with its former members moving onto new alliances. On February 26, 2008, Kobashi, Akiyama, Kanemaru and Shiga, the four original members of Burning, reunited for one night only, when they were defeated by Naomichi Marufuji, Mitsuharu Misawa, Mushiking Terry and Yoshinari Ogawa in Kobashi's twentieth anniversary match. In April 2012, Go Shiozaki and Tamon Honda revived Burning for the 2012 Global Tag League. However, winning only three of their seven matches in the tournament, they failed to qualify for the finals.

=== Third incarnation (2012–2015) ===
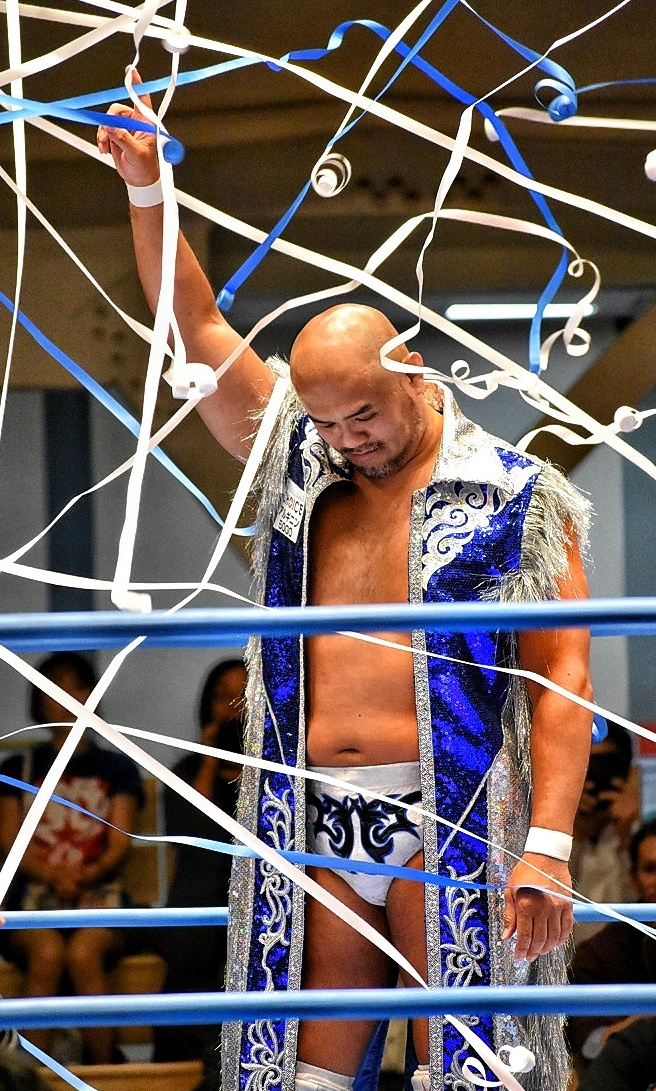
Jun Akiyama, original co-founder and the leader of the third incarnation of Burning

On December 3, 2012, the Tokyo Sports newspaper reported that Pro Wrestling Noah had decided to terminate the contract of Kenta Kobashi, who had suffered various injuries the past years and was at the time again sidelined from in-ring action. Tokyo Sports also reported that the termination led to a backlash from Noah wrestlers with Atsushi Aoki, Go Shiozaki, Jun Akiyama, Kotaro Suzuki and Yoshinobu Kanemaru announcing that they were not going to re-sign with Noah, when their contracts with the promotion ran out at the end of the year. Noah president Akira Taue responded to the report, announcing that Kobashi would address his situation at Ryōgoku Kokugikan on December 9, while also confirming that the promotion was in negotiations with five wrestlers whose contracts were set to expire shortly. On December 9, Kobashi announced that he would wrestle one more match and retire in a Noah ring sometime during 2013. On December 19, Noah announced that the negotiations with Atsushi Aoki, Go Shiozaki, Jun Akiyama, Kotaro Suzuki and Yoshinobu Kanemaru had ended and all five men would leave the promotion following December 24. After parting ways with Noah, the five men made an unadvertised appearance for AJPW on January 26, 2013, announcing that they had joined the promotion, forming the third incarnation of the Burning stable. Though essentially working exclusively for AJPW, the five were officially freelancers. The five quickly laid claim to All Japan's top titles.

Yoshinobu Kanemaru was the first of the five to receive his title shot and on February 23, defeated Shuji Kondo for the World Junior Heavyweight Championship. The event was headlined by a five singles match series between members of Burning and representatives of AJPW; Burning won the series 3–2 with Kanemaru clinching the decisive win in the main event. Burning received two more title shots on March 17. After Aoki and Suzuki failed to capture the All Asia Tag Team Championship from the Junior Stars (Koji Kanemoto and Minoru Tanaka), Akiyama and Shiozaki brought the stable its second title by defeating Get Wild (Manabu Soya and Takao Omori) for the World Tag Team Championship. Also during the event, Kenta Kobashi made an appearance, publicly giving his blessing to the newest incarnation of Burning, while also announcing that he was joining AJPW following his retirement match as the new Pacific Wrestling Federation (PWF) chairman. On April 7, Aoki and Suzuki defeated Jounetsu Hentai Baka (Hikaru Sato and Hiroshi Yamato) in the finals to win the 2013 Junior Hyper Tag League and earn another shot at the All Asia Tag Team Championship. This led to a rematch between Aoki and Suzuki and the Junior Stars on April 25, where Burning took home its third title. Burning's domination led to a storyline, where even rivals such as Suwama and Takao Omori came together to rally AJPW in its war with the stable. Burning continued its winning ways on April 29, when Jun Akiyama won the 2013 Champion Carnival, being victorious in the finals over Kai, who had defeated Go Shiozaki in his semifinal match. As a result, Akiyama became the number one contender to AJPW's top title, the Triple Crown Heavyweight Championship. On May 11, all five members of Burning made a one-night return to Noah to take part in Kenta Kobashi's retirement event, titled Final Burning in Budokan. While Aoki and Suzuki wrestled in a midcard tag team match, where they defeated former Burning members Kentaro Shiga and Tamon Honda, the other three members took part in Kobashi's retirement match, an eight-man tag team main event, where Kanemaru, Shiozaki, Kenta and Maybach Taniguchi, another Kobashi trainee and a member of the second incarnation of Burning, were defeated by Kobashi, Akiyama, Keiji Mutoh and Kensuke Sasaki, with Kobashi pinning Kanemaru for the win.

On June 30, Akiyama received his shot at the Triple Crown Heavyweight Championship, but was defeated by the defending champion, Suwama. Post-match, Suwama accepted a challenge made for his title by another Burning member, Go Shiozaki. June 30 also marked the end of an era for AJPW, when several wrestlers loyal to Keiji Mutoh left the promotion in a mass exodus caused by Nobuo Shiraishi taking over as the promotion's new president. All five members of Burning, however, remained loyal to AJPW and, on July 5, announced that they had signed contracts with the promotion, officially ending their freelancing days. On August 25, Go Shiozaki also failed in his attempt to capture the Triple Crown Heavyweight Championship from Suwama. In September, Akiyama, Kanemaru, Shiozaki and Suzuki all took part in the 2013 Ōdō Tournament. Shiozaki made it furthest in the tournament, reaching the finals, after eliminating both Suzuki and Kanemaru as well as top World Tag Team Championship contender Joe Doering, before losing to Akebono. On October 22, Akiyama and Shiozaki lost the World Tag Team Championship to Evolution (Joe Doering and Suwama). The following day, Shiozaki announced that he was leaving Burning in order to reach the Triple Crown. This was followed by Suzuki announcing on October 29 that he was also leaving Burning in order to challenge Kanemaru for the World Junior Heavyweight Championship. Suzuki was followed out of Burning by his All Asia Tag Team Championship partner Aoki, leaving Akiyama and Kanemaru as the two remaining members of the stable. Shiozaki, Aoki and Suzuki remained together following their resignation from Burning, forming the new Xceed stable on November 21.

On January 26, 2014, Akiyama and Kanemaru gained a measure of revenge on their former stablemates, when they defeated Aoki and Suzuki to win the All Asia Tag Team Championship. In April, Akiyama made it to the finals of the 2014 Champion Carnival, before losing to Takao Omori on April 27. Two days later, Akiyama and Kanemaru lost the All Asia Tag Team Championship to Keisuke Ishii and Shigehiro Irie at a DDT Pro-Wrestling event. Later that same event, Akiyama captured the comedic Ironman Heavymetalweight Championship by accidentally pinning the previous champion, the title belt itself, during a backstage interview. After the Triple Crown Heavyweight Championship was vacated, Akiyama was chosen to take part in a decision match to determine the new champion. On June 15, he was defeated in the match by Takao Omori.

In early 2014, Akiyama began teaming regularly with Takao Omori as Wild Burning, combining the names of Burning and Get Wild. The duo captured the World Tag Team Championship on two occasions, while also winning the 2014 World's Strongest Tag Determination League. Kanemaru, meanwhile, formed a partnership with Último Dragón with whom he went on to regain the All Asia Tag Team Championship. In July 2014, Akiyama also took over as the new president of AJPW. Burning has been largely inactive since the formation of Wild Burning, however, both Akiyama and Kanemaru are still billed as members of the stable by AJPW. On November 1, Akiyama defeated Akebono to win the Triple Crown Heavyweight Championship. On November 20, Kanemaru announced he would be leaving AJPW following December 15. Kanemaru joined Akebono and former Burning stablemates Go Shiozaki and Kotaro Suzuki in an exodus caused by contractual issues.

=== Fourth incarnation (2021–2024) ===
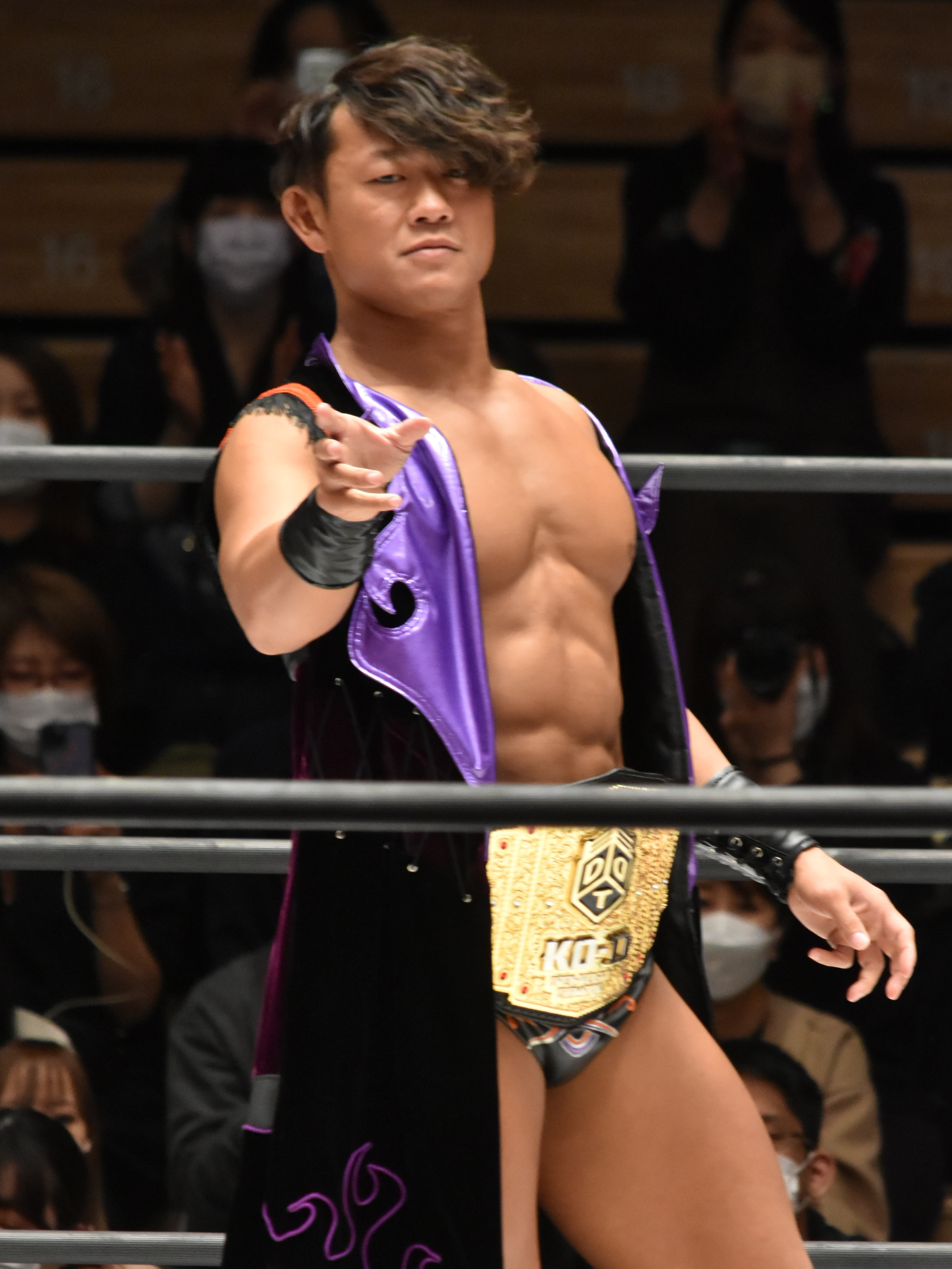
Tetsuya Endo, the fourth incarnation leader of Burning

On December 7, 2021, DDT Pro-Wrestling announced that Kenta Kobashi had endorsed the reformation of the stable. This incarnation would be led by Tetsuya Endo (who had been left without a stable since the dissolution of Damnation in September of that year) and would have Jun Akiyama, Yusuke Okada and Yuya Koroku as its members. On December 26, at Never Mind 2021 in Yoyogi, this fourth incarnation debuted by defeating The37Kamiina (Shunma Katsumata, Yuki Ueno, Mao and Toui Kojima).

From January 30 to February 27, 2022, Tetsuya Endo and Jun Akiyama represented the stable in the Ultimate Tag League, winning three of their four matches, losing only to the team of Konosuke Takeshita and Yuki Ueno, and failed to advance to the final. On March 20, at Judgement 2022: DDT 25th Anniversary, Endo defeated Takeshita to win the KO-D Openweight Championship for the third time. On May 1, at Mega Max Bump 2022, Jun Akiyama and Yusuke Okada unsuccessfully challenged Calamari Drunken Kings (Chris Brookes and Masahiro Takanashi) for the KO-D Tag Team Championship. On June 12, at CyberFight Festival 2022, Endo and Akiyama teamed with Kazusada Higuchi to represent DDT against the Pro Wrestling Noah team of Katsuhiko Nakajima, Atsushi Kotoge and Yoshiki Inamura in a six-man tag team match, where in the match, Nakajima delivered a slap to Endo that legitimately knocked Endo out, causing the match to be called off. Two days later, as a result of the concussion he suffered, Endo announced he would be sidelined until July 24 and he would vacate the KO-D Openweight Championship. From June 16 to July 3, Akiyama took part in the 2022 King of DDT Tournament. Endo was scheduled to participate as well but had to forfeit his first round match due to the concussion. Akiyama defeated Yukio Sakaguchi in the opening round, then Yuki "Sexy" Iino in the second round, but lost in the semi-final to the eventual winner Kazusada Higuchi. Throughout the remaining of the year, Burning mainly competed in six-man tag team matches, sometimes teaming with wrestlers from outside the stable. On September 18, at Sternness 30th Anniversary, an event celebrating Akiyama's 30-year career as a professional wrestler, he and Endo teamed with Yoshinobu Kanemaru to defeat Konosuke Takeshita, Shunma Katsumata and Yuji Nagata. From November 1 to December 4, Endo participated in the 2022 D-Oh Grand Prix, during which he finished tied second in his block with a record of two wins, two losses and a draw. At the final event of the tournament, Kotaro Suzuki teamed with Endo and Okada to defeat Harashima, Kazuki Hirata and Yukio Naya. Later, that night, Akiyama defeated Joey Janela in a tables, ladders, and chairs match to win the DDT Extreme Championship. Suzuki would then join the stable as an associate member. On December 10, at Sternness 30th Anniversary Vol. 2 in Osaka, Endo and Akiyama teamed with Sanshiro Takagi to take on Zeus, The Bodyguard and Ryoji Sai in a losing effort. On December 29, at Never Mind 2022, Endo, Suzuki and Okada won the KO-D 6-Man Tag Team Championship by defeating Naruki Doi, Toru Owashi and Kazuki Hirata. In the next match, Akiyama retained his DDT Extreme Championship against Super Sasadango Machine.

On January 21, 2023, at the Sweet Dreams! 2023 tour event in Yokohama, Jun Akiyama successfully defended the DDT Extreme Championship against Antonio Honda. On January 29, at Sweet Dreams! 2023, Burning retained the KO-D 6-Man Tag Team Championship against Pheromones (Yuki "Sexy" Iino, Danshoku "Dandy" Dino and Koju "Shining Ball" Takeda). On February 18, at Friendship, Effort, Victory in Nagoya 2023, Akiyama successfully defended the DDT Extreme Championship against Akito in a "Master of Environment" match. On February 26, at Into The Fight 2023, Burning lost the KO-D 6-Man Tag Team Championship to Shinya Aoki, Yuki Ueno and Super Sasadango Machine. On March 21, at Judgement 2023, Akiyama successfully defended the DDT Extreme Championship against Kotaro Suzuki. Later that night, Tetsuya Endo defeated Naruki Doi to win the DDT Universal Championship. On March 31, in Los Angeles, California, Endo and Akiyama defeated Homicide and Tony Deppen at an event co-produced with Game Changer Wrestling. On May 3, at Mega Max Bump 2023, Akiyama lost the DDT Extreme Championship to Shunma Katsumata in a toys, ladders, and chairs match. Later that night, Endo retained the DDT Universal Championship against Mao. From May 6 to May 21, Endo, Akiyama, Suzuki and Okada took part in the 2023 King of DDT Tournament. In the opening round Okada lost to Kazusada Higuchi, Suzuki defeated Kanon, and Endo lost to Akiyama. In the second round, Suzuki was eliminated by Yuki Ueno, while Akiyama defeated Mao to advance. Akiyama then lost in the semi-final round to the eventual winner Chris Brookes. On July 23, at Wrestle Peter Pan 2023, Kotaro Suzuki, Yusuke Okada and Yuya Koroku were involved in a three-way match against Damnation T.A (Minoru Fujita, MJ Paul and Kanon) and the team of Naruki Doi, Toru Owashi and Kazuki Hirata. Damnation T.A won the match when Kanon pinned Koroku. Later that night, Endo lost the DDT Universal Championship to Matt Cardona. On September 8, the stable made an appearance in AJPW on day 3 of the Giant Series tour, when Akiyama and Okada teamed with Sanshiro Takagi to defeat Evolution's Suwama, Hikaru Sato and Dan Tamura. The next day, at DDT Big Bang 2023, they lost to Atsushi Onita, Yoshitatsu and Toy Kojima in a time delayed scramble bunkhouse six-man exploding deathmatch. After the match, Onita and Yoshitatsu accepted Akiyama and Suzuki as their next challenger for the All Asia Tag Team Championship. The title match was held as an exploding bat and board tag team deathmatch on September 18, at Dramatic Explosion 2023 and saw Akiyama and Suzuki capture the championship from Onita and Yoshitatsu. On October 7, at the God Bless DDT 2023 tour event in Sanjō, Akiyama and Suzuki successfully defended the All Asia Tag Team Championship against Takao Omori and Yoshitatsu. They would eventually lose the title to Eruption (Yukio Sakaguchi and Hideki Okatani) on November 3, at Road to Ultimate Party 2023 in Shinjuku.

On October 22, Jun Akiyama found himself teaming with Danshoku Dino and Makoto Oishi, defeating Kazusada Higuchi, Akito and Yusuke Okada. After the match, Oishi suggested the three form a stable he named D・O・A (standing both for "Dead Or Alive" and their initials). Oishi's enthusiasm was initially met with skepticism from Akiyama and Dino, but neither of them outright rejected the idea and thus nothing was made official yet. On November 16, on the Get Alive 2023 tour event in Shinjuku, following Saki Akai's retirement from professional wrestling and the ensuing vacancy of the KO-D 6-Man Tag Team Championship, DDT held a four-team tournament to crown new champions. Akiyama participated in the tournament by teaming once again with Dino and Oishi. Together they defeated Schadenfreude International (Chris Brookes, Masahiro Takanashi and Antonio Honda) in the first round, then they defeated The37Kamiina's Yuki Ueno, Mao and Toy Kojima in the final to become the 53rd KO-D 6-Man Tag Team Champions. After the match, Oishi brought back his idea of a D・O・A stable, which Akiyama and Dino accepted. Then, in his backstage comments, Akiyama announced he would be leaving Burning at the end of the year.

== Members ==
=== Current members ===
- Tetsuya Endo (leader)
- Yuki Iino
- Yuya Koroku
- Kotaro Suzuki (associate)

=== Former members ===
- Jun Akiyama
- Atsushi Aoki
- Tamon Honda
- Yoshinobu Kanemaru
- Kenta
- Tsuyoshi Kikuchi
- Kenta Kobashi
- Yusuke Okada
- Takeshi Rikio
- Kentaro Shiga
- Go Shiozaki
- Kotaro Suzuki
- Shuhei Taniguchi

== Championships and accomplishments ==
- First incarnation
  - All Japan Pro Wrestling
    - Triple Crown Heavyweight Championship (2 times) – Kobashi
    - World Tag Team Championship (2 times) – Akiyama and Kobashi
    - Asunaro Cup (2000) – Kanemaru
    - Champion Carnival (2000) – Kobashi
    - One Night 6 Man Tag Team Tournament (1999) – Akiyama, Kobashi and Shiga
    - World's Strongest Tag Determination League (1998, 1999) – Akiyama and Kobashi
  - Tokyo Sports
    - Best Tag Team Award (1999) – Akiyama and Kobashi
    - Fighting Spirit Award (1998) – Akiyama
    - MVP Award (1998) – Kobashi
    - Rookie of the Year Award (1998) – Kanemaru
- Second incarnation
  - Pro Wrestling Noah
    - GHC Heavyweight Championship (1 time) – Kobashi
    - GHC Junior Heavyweight Championship (1 time) – Kenta
    - GHC Tag Team Championship (2 times) – Honda and Kobashi
    - One Day 6 Man Tag Tournament (2002) – Kenta, Kobashi and Shiga
  - Tokyo Sports
    - Outstanding Performance Award (2003) – Kobashi
    - Rookie of the Year Award (2000) – Rikio
- Third incarnation
  - All Japan Pro Wrestling
    - All Asia Tag Team Championship (2 times) – Aoki and Suzuki (1) and Akiyama and Kanemaru (1)
    - Triple Crown Heavyweight Championship (1 time) – Akiyama
    - World Junior Heavyweight Championship (1 time) – Kanemaru
    - World Tag Team Championship (1 time) – Akiyama and Shiozaki
    - Champion Carnival (2013) – Akiyama
    - Junior Hyper Tag League (2013) – Aoki and Suzuki
    - Ōdō Tournament (2015) – Akiyama
  - DDT Pro-Wrestling
    - Ironman Heavymetalweight Championship (3 times) – Akiyama
- Fourth incarnation
  - All Japan Pro Wrestling
    - All Asia Tag Team Championship (1 time) – Akiyama and Suzuki
  - DDT Pro-Wrestling
    - KO-D Openweight Championship (1 time) – Endo
    - DDT Universal Championship (2 times) – Endo (1), Iino (1)
    - DDT Extreme Championship (1 time) – Akiyama
    - KO-D Tag Team Championship (1 time) – Endo and Iino
    - KO-D 6-Man Tag Team Championship (1 time) – Endo, Suzuki and Okada
  - Pro Wrestling NOAH
    - GHC National Championship (1 time) – Endo

== See also ==
- All Japan Pro Wrestling
- Pro Wrestling Noah
- Puroresu
- Wild Burning
