= DDT Judgement =

Judgement
- Promotions: CyberFight
- Brands: DDT Pro-Wrestling
- First event: Judgement (1997)
- Event gimmick: Anniversary show

Judgement is an annual professional wrestling event promoted by DDT Pro-Wrestling (DDT). The event has been held since the official DDT launching event in 1997 (though there was a pre-launch event on January 31, held at the Akishima Cultural Center). It has been airing domestically on Fighting TV Samurai since 2002 and later as an Internet pay-per-view (iPPV) on CyberFight's streaming service Wrestle Universe. The event is usually held around March and serves as DDT's anniversary event.

== Events ==
No.	Event	Date	City	Venue	Attendance	Main event	Ref.
1	Judgement	March 25, 1997	Tokyo, Japan	Hibiya Radio City	N/A	Super Uchuu Power and Kamen Shooter Super Rider vs. Sanshiro Takagi and Kazushige Nozawa	
2	Judgement 2	March 25, 1998	Tokyo, Japan	Kitazawa Town Hall	328	Sanshiro Takagi, Kazushige Nozawa and Koichiro Kimura vs. Masao Orihara, ZIP and Hidetomo Egawa	
3	Judgement 3	March 20, 1999	Tokyo, Japan	Itabashi Green Hall	330	Super Uchuu Power, Phantom Funakashi and Tsunehito Naito vs. Sanshiro Takagi, Exciting Yoshida and Kamen Shooter Super Rider	
4	Judgement 4	March 30, 2000	Tokyo, Japan	Kitazawa Town Hall	500	Sanshiro Takagi, Mitsunobu Kikuzawa and Exciting Yoshida vs. Masao Orihara, Poison Sawada Black and Masahiko Orihara	
5	Judgement 5	March 28, 2001	Tokyo, Japan	Kitazawa Town Hall	294	Sanshiro Takagi (c) vs. Exciting Yoshida for the KO-D Openweight Championship	
6	Judgement 6	March 25, 2002	Tokyo, Japan	Club Atom	252	Kintaro Kanemura and Super Uchuu Power vs. Poison Sawada Julie and Sanshiro Takagi	
7	Judgement 7	March 15, 2003	Tokyo, Japan	Korakuen Geopolis	683	Sanshiro Takagi vs. Takashi Sasaki	
8	Judgement 8	March 20, 2004	Tokyo, Japan	Velfarre	750	Akarangers (Gentaro and Takashi Sasaki) (c) vs. Suicideboyz (Mikami and Thanomsak Toba) for the KO-D Tag Team Championship	
9	DDT 8th Anniversary: Judgement 9	March 27, 2005	Tokyo, Japan	Shinjuku Club Heights	600	Far East Connection (Nobutaka Moribe and Tomohiko Hashimoto) (c) vs. MoroToba (Seiya Morohashi and Thanomsak Toba) for the KO-D Tag Team Championship	
10	DDT 9th Anniversary: Judgement 10	March 5, 2006	Tokyo, Japan	Shinjuku Face	600	Daichi Kakimoto and Kota Ibushi (c) vs. Italian Four Horsemen (Francesco Togo and Mori Bernard) for the KO-D Tag Team Championship	
11	10th Anniversary: Judgement 2007	March 11, 2007	Tokyo, Japan	Kitazawa Town Hall	294	Harashima, Seiya Morohashi and Kota Ibushi vs. Sanshiro Takagi, Kudo and Thanomsak Toba	
11	Judgement Anniversary Special	March 11, 2007	Tokyo, Japan	Kitazawa Town Hall	294	Sanshiro Takagi and Mikami vs. Masao Orihara and Nosawa Rongai	
12	Judgement 2008	March 9, 2008	Tokyo, Japan	Korakuen Hall	1,200	Harashima (c) vs. Yasu Urano for the KO-D Openweight Championship	
13	Judgement 2009	April 5, 2009	Tokyo, Japan	Korakuen Hall	1,454	Double Chance Battle Royal to determine the No. 1 contender to the KO-D Openweight Championship	
14	Judgement 2010	March 14, 2010	Tokyo, Japan	Korakuen Hall	1,504	Daisuke Sekimoto (c) vs. Sanshiro Takagi for the KO-D Openweight Championship	
15	Judgement 2011	March 27, 2011	Tokyo, Japan	Korakuen Hall	1,518	Dick Togo (c) vs. Kota Ibushi for the KO-D Openweight Championship	
16	Judgement 2012	March 11, 2012	Tokyo, Japan	Korakuen Hall	1,408	Danshoku Dino (c) vs. Hikaru Sato for the KO-D Openweight Championship	
17	Judgement 2013	March 20, 2013	Tokyo, Japan	Korakuen Hall	1,435	Kenny Omega (c) vs. Shigehiro Irie for the KO-D Openweight Championship	
18	Judgement 2014	March 21, 2014	Tokyo, Japan	Korakuen Hall	1,618	Harashima (c) vs. Kudo for the KO-D Openweight Championship	
19	Judgement 2015	March 29, 2015	Tokyo, Japan	Korakuen Hall	2,200	Strong BJ (Daisuke Sekimoto and Yuji Okabayashi) (c) vs. Danshoku Dino and Super Sasadango Machine for the KO-D Tag Team Championship	
20	Judgement 2016: DDT 19th Anniversary	March 21, 2016	Tokyo, Japan	Ryōgoku Kokugikan	6,938	Isami Kodaka (c) vs. Harashima for the KO-D Openweight Championship	
21	Judgement 2017: DDT 20th Anniversary	March 20, 2017	Saitama, Japan	Saitama Super Arena	10,702	Harashima (c) vs. Konosuke Takeshita for the KO-D Openweight Championship	
22	Judgement 2018: DDT 21st Anniversary	March 25, 2018	Tokyo, Japan	Ryōgoku Kokugikan	5,796	Konosuke Takeshita (c) vs. Shuji Ishikawa for the KO-D Openweight Championship	
23	Judgement 2019: DDT 22nd Anniversary	February 17, 2019	Tokyo, Japan	Ryōgoku Kokugikan	4,177	Daisuke Sasaki (c) vs. Konosuke Takeshita for the KO-D Openweight Championship	
24	Judgement 2020: DDT 23rd Anniversary	March 20, 2020	Tokyo, Japan	Korakuen Hall	916	Masato Tanaka (c) vs. Konosuke Takeshita for the KO-D Openweight Championship	
25	Judgement 2021: DDT 24th Anniversary	March 28, 2021	Tokyo, Japan	Korakuen Hall	669	Jun Akiyama (c) vs. Kazusada Higuchi for the KO-D Openweight Championship	
26	Judgement 2022: DDT 25th Anniversary	March 20, 2022	Tokyo, Japan	Ryōgoku Kokugikan	2,516	Konosuke Takeshita (c) vs. Tetsuya Endo for the KO-D Openweight Championship	
27	Judgement 2023	March 21, 2023	Tokyo, Japan	Korakuen Hall	1,138	Yuji Hino (c) vs. Yukio Naya for the KO-D Openweight Championship	
28	Judgement 2024	March 17, 2024	Tokyo, Japan	Korakuen Hall	1,491	Yuki Ueno (c) vs. Harashima for the KO-D Openweight Championship	
29	Judgement 2025	March 20, 2025	Tokyo, Japan	Korakuen Hall	N/A	Chris Brookes (c) vs. Masahiro Takanashi for the KO-D Openweight Championship	
30	Judgement 2026	March 22, 2026	Tokyo, Japan	Korakuen Hall	N/A	Yuki Ueno (c) vs. Kanon for the KO-D Openweight Championship	
(c) – refers to the champion(s) heading into the match
