= Judgement 2 =

1998 DDT Pro-Wrestling event

- Promotion: DDT Pro-Wrestling
- Date: March 25, 1998
- City: Tokyo, Japan
- Venue: Kitazawa Town Hall
- Attendance: 328

Judgement chronology
← Previous; 1997	Next → 3

Judgement 2 was a professional wrestling event promoted by DDT Pro-Wrestling (DDT). It took place on March 25, 1998, in Tokyo, Japan, at the Kitazawa Town Hall. It was the second event under the Judgement name.

== Storylines ==
Judgement 2 featured five professional wrestling matches that involved different wrestlers from pre-existing scripted feuds and storylines. Wrestlers portrayed villains, heroes, or less distinguishable characters in the scripted events that built tension and culminated in a wrestling match or series of matches.

== Results ==
No.	Results	Stipulations	Times
1	Phantom Funakoshi defeated Takashi Sasaki	Singles match	9:39
2	Chotaro Kamoi, Ichiro Yaguchi, Exciting Yoshida and Thanomsak Toba defeated Kengo Takai, Yusaku Shimoda, Lion and Kurokage	Eight-man tag team match	18:59
3	Yuki Nishino defeated Kyohei Mikami	Singles match	8:09
4	Kamen Shooter Super Rider defeated Asian Cougar	Singles match	11:49
5	Sanshiro Takagi, Kazushige Nosawa and Koichiro Kimura defeated Masao Orihara, Hidetomo Egawa and Z-P	Six-man tag team match	14:17
