= Yuki Iino =

Japanese professional wrestler

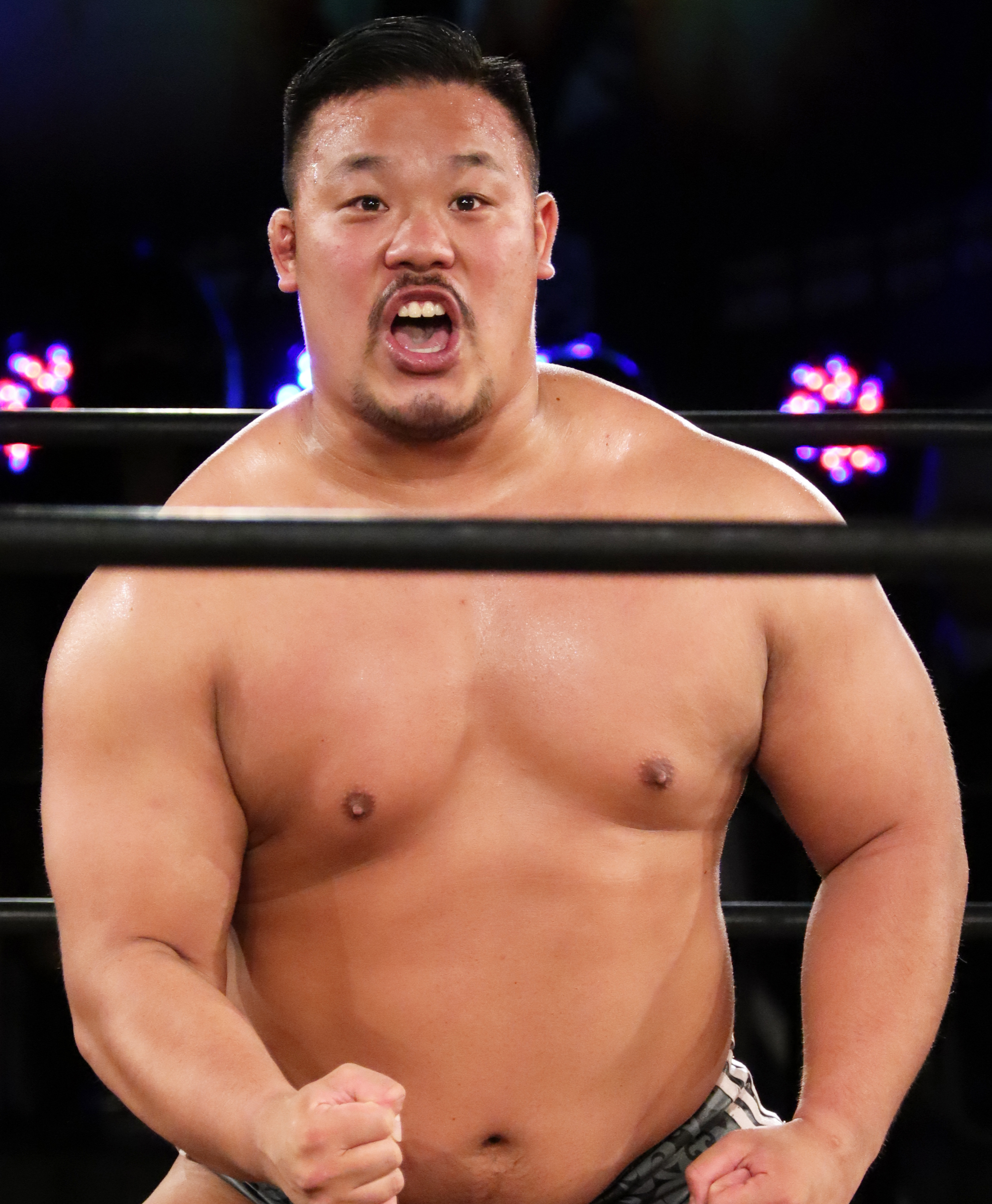
- Iino in 2020

Personal information
- Born: October 24, 1994 (age 32) Tama, Tokyo, Japan
- Education: Kokushikan University

Professional wrestling career
- Ring names: Yuki Iino; Yuki "Sexy" Iino; Yuki "not Sexy" Iino
- Billed height: 1.78 m (5 ft 10 in)
- Billed weight: 120 kg (265 lb)
- Debut: August 20, 2017

Yuki Iino (飯野 雄貴, Iino Yūki; born October 24, 1994) is a Japanese professional wrestler. He is currently signed to Pro Wrestling Noah, where he is a member of Passionate Ratel's and is one-half of the GHC Tag Team Champions in his first reign. He is known for his time in DDT Pro-Wrestling, where he is a former DDT Universal Champion; as well as being a former DDT Extreme Champion, KO-D Tag Team Champion with Tetsuya Endo, three-time KO-D 6-Man Tag Team Champion and KO-D 10-Man Tag Team Champion.

== Professional wrestling career ==
=== DDT Pro Wrestling ===
==== Early career and All Out (2017–2021) ====
Iino made his professional wrestling debut in DDT Pro-Wrestling (DDT) at Ryōgoku Peter Pan 2017, teaming up with Kouki Iwasaki in a losing effort against Yuki Ueno and Naomi Yoshimura.

On July 31, 2018, Iino was eliminated by Soma Takao in the first round of the King of DDT Tournament. At Summer Vacation 2018 on July 22, he participated in a tag team scramble rumble for the Uchicomi! Openweight Ultimate Championship, where he teamed up with Super Sasadango Machine. On August 14 at MajiManji #14, Iino teamed up with Yuki Ueno in a losing effort against Akito and Gota Ihashi. After the match, he was offered to joined the All Out stable by Akito and Shunma Katsumata. On August 26 at the final event of the King of DDT Tournament, Iino teamed up with Akito as All Out alongside Gorgeous Matsuno and Saki Akai, falling short to T2Hii (Kazuki Hirata, Sanshiro Takagi and Toru Owashi) in a 4-on-3 handicap lucha rules match. In November at Ultimate Party 2019, Iino, Danshoku Dino, Asuka, Mizuki and Trans-Am★Hiroshi defeated Super Sasadango Machine, Yuna Manase, Jiro "Ikemen" Kuroshio, Hiroshi Yamato and Makoto Oishi to win the vacant KO-D 10-Man Tag Team Championship. Due to a lack of defenses, they would vacate the title in December 2020. On November 30 at the D-Oh Grand Prix 2019 event in Shinjuku, Iino teamed up again with his All Out stable partner Akito, Antonio Honda, Gorgeous Matsuno and Makoto Oishi to defeat #StrongHearts (Cima, Dezmond Xavier, El Lindaman, Trey Miguel and Zachary Wentz) in a ten-man tag team match.

On January 3, 2019, at DDT Live! MajiManji Super: New Year Special!, Iino, Konosuke Takeshita and Akito won the KO-D 6-Man Tag Team Championship by defeating #StrongHearts (Cima, Duan Yingnan and T-Hawk). At Sweet Dreams 2019 on January 27, Iino competed for the Ironman Heavymetalweight Championship in a battle royal also involving the eventual winner Asuka, Chinsuke Nakamura, Kazuki Hirata, Kazusada Higuchi, Keisuke Okuda, Kikutaro and Toru Owashi. At Judgement 2019: DDT 22nd Anniversary on February 17, 2019, Iino teamed up with Daisuke Sekimoto and Toru Owashi in a losing effort against Yukio Naya, Go Shiozaki and Kazusada Higuchi. At Into The Fight 2019 on March 21, Iino, Akito and Takeshita lost the KO-D 6-Man Tag Team Championship to Sendai Girls' Pro Wrestling (Chihiro Hashimoto, Dash Chisako and Meiko Satomura). On June 24, Iino participated in DDT/Sendai Girls All Out X Sendai Girls Pro Wrestling, a cross-over event produced and promoted by both DDT and Sendai Girls' Pro Wrestling, where he teamed up with fellow All Out stable members Konosuke Takeshita and Shunma Katsumata to win the KO-D 6-Man Tag Team Championship from Hashimoto, Chisako and Satomura. At God Bless DDT 2019 on November 24, having won a number one contendership match a week prior, Iino unsuccessfully challenged Harashima for the KO-D Openweight Championship.

At Sweet Dreams! 2020 on January 26, Iino teamed up with Chihiro Hashimoto to unsuccessfully challenge Nautilus (Naomi Yoshimura and Yuki Ueno) for the KO-D Tag Team Championship in an intergender tag team match. At Judgement 2021: DDT 24th Anniversary on March 28, he teamed up with Yusuke Okada in a losing effort to Chris Brookes and Toui Kojima.

After two and a half years of activity, the All Out unit disbanded at the All Out Final Fight event that took place on March 12, 2021.

==== Pheromones (2021–2023) ====
In August 2021, Iino changed his ring name to Yuki "Sexy" Iino when he formed a new unit called Pheromones with Danshoku Dino – now going by the moniker Danshoku "Dandy" Dino – and Yumehito "Fantastic" Imanari. On November 3, Iino along with fellow Pheromones stablemates, Dino and Imanari, won the vacant KO-D 6-Man Tag Team Championship by defeating the team of Sanshiro Takagi, Shinya Aoki and Yusuke Okada at the D-Oh Grand Prix 2021 II event in Ōta.

In the 2022 Ultimate Tag League, Yuki Iino and Yumehito Imanari finished second of the B Block with 4 points and failed to advance to the final. On February 14 at the Ultimate Tag League event in Shinjuku, Iino beat Shinya Aoki in a Turkish oil wrestling match to win the DDT Extreme Championship, marking his first singles championship victory in DDT since his debut in August 2017. On April 10, at April Fool 2022, Pheromones lost the KO-D 6-Man Tag Team Championship to Damnation T.A. (Daisuke Sasaki, Minoru Fujita and MJ Paul). On June 12, Pheromones teamed with Akito (as Akito "Co-Chin" Nishigaki) at CyberFight Festival 2022, a joint event between all CyberFight brands, to defeat Shinya Aoki, Sanshiro Takagi, Yumiko Hotta and Kendo Kashin. In June, Iino entered the King of DDT Tournament, defeating Mao in the first round. However, in the second round, Iino lost to Jun Akiyama. On July 16, Iino lost the DDT Extreme Championship to Akito in a 3-on-1 handicap match in which he was teaming with Dino and Imanari, with Sanshiro Takagi as a special referee.

On March 21, 2023, at Judgement 2023, Iino challenged Yuji Hino to a KO-D Openweight Championship match at Mega Max Bump 2023. At the request of Hino, he would fight as Yuki "not Sexy" Iino and abandon his Pheromones persona and behaviour for the match. On March 31, 2023, Iino and Dino fought to a no contest against Bussy (Allie Katch and Effy) at GCW vs. DDT, a joint event with Game Changer Wrestling (GCW) held in Los Angeles, CA. On May 3, at Mega Max Bump 2023, Iino lost to Yuji Hino. On October 4, Pheromones disbanded. The following month, Iino, now shedding the "Sexy" moniker, entered the annual D-Oh Grand Prix competing in the A Block. Iino ended the tournament with 4 points, finishing fifth of his block and therefore failing to advance to the final.

==== Burning and DDT Universal Champion (2024) ====
On January 5, 2024, during the Sweet Dreams! 2024 tour, Iino saved Burning leader Tetsuya Endo from an attack by Damnation T.A. after a match. Endo then granted his request to join the Burning stable. On February 7, Iino and Endo defeated Damnation T.A. (Daisuke Sasaki and Kanon) to win the KO-D Tag Team Championship. On March 17, at Judgement 2024, Burning made their first defense against All Japan Pro Wrestling's New Period (Ryuki Honda and Yuma Anzai). The following month, the duo successfully defended the title against Jun Akiyama and Tomomitsu Matsunaga. In May, Iino entered the King of DDT Tournament but was defeated in the first round by Daisuke Sasaki. On June 6, at Gleat Ver.&: Gleat×DDT, a joint event between Gleat and DDT, Iino teamed with Kazusada Higuchi and Yukio Naya to defeat Gleat's Bulk Orchestra (Hayato Tamura, Kazma Sakamoto and Ryuichi Kawakami). On July 21, at Wrestle Peter Pan 2024, Burning successfully defended the KO-D Tag Team Championship for the third time against Pro Wrestling Noah's Go Shiozaki and Atsushi Kotoge. The duo eventually lost the tag team title to Schadenfreude International (Chris Brookes and Takeshi Masada) on August 10. On August 12, the duo defeated 1 Called Manders and Gringo Loco at Never Ending Noisy Summer, a joint event with GCW held in Korakuen Hall. On September 7, Iino defeated Kanon and won a Right To Challenge Anytime Anywhere. The very next day, Iino cashed in his contract to successfully challenge Mao for the DDT Universal Championship. Yuki Iino would later lose the title back to Mao, who cashed in their contract to successfully challenge him for the DDT Universal Championship, ending his reign at 42 days.

==== Departure (2026) ====
On September 2, 2026, DDT Pro Wrestling announced that Iino will make his transfer to Pro Wrestling Noah as his contract with DDT expires in November. On November 3, Iino would make his final match for DDT Pro Wrestling at Ultimate Party against Yukio Naya in a losing effort, ending his nine-year tenure with the promotion.

=== Pro Wrestling Noah (2024-Present) ===
Yuki Iino made his debut in Pro Wrestling Noah on March 3, 2024, where he teamed up with Tetsuya Endo as part of Burning in a winning effort in a match against Genta Ubari and Go Shiozaki. IIno would make periodic appearances in Noah, all of them being in various tag matches, with his last one taking place on May 29.

On May 2, 2026 at Noah Spring Mayhem, Iino would make his reappearance in Noah, wherein he became the newest member of the stable, Passionate Ratel's.. From May 23 to June 13, Iino would team up with Manabu Soya to take part in the 2026 Global Tag League as Passionate Max, finishing the tournament with a record of four wins and one loss, advancing to the finals of the tournament. On June 16, Soya and Iino defeated The Good Brothers (Doc Gallows and Karl Anderson) in the finals to win the tournament. On the second night of the Noah Legacy Rise 2026 on June 25, Iino and Soya defeated Los Tranquilos de Japon (Bushi and Tetsuya Naito) to win the GHC Tag Team Championship, marking Iino's first title win in Noah.

== Championships and accomplishments ==
- DDT Pro-Wrestling
  - DDT Extreme Championship (1 time)
  - DDT Universal Championship (1 time)
  - Ironman Heavymetalweight Championship (1 time)
  - KO-D Tag Team Championship (2 times) – with Tetsuya Endo (1) and Yukio Naya (1)
  - KO-D 6-Man Tag Team Championship (3 times) – with Konosuke Takeshita and Akito (1), Konosuke Takeshita and Shunma Katsumata (1), and Danshoku "Dandy" Dino and Yumehito "Fantastic" Imanari (1)
  - KO-D 10-Man Tag Team Championship (1 time) – with Danshoku Dino, Asuka, Mizuki and Trans-Am★Hiroshi
- Japan Indie Awards
  - Best Unit Award (2021, 2022) – with Pheromones
- Pro Wrestling Illustrated
  - Ranked No. 386 of the top 500 singles wrestlers in the PWI 500 in 2025
- Pro Wrestling Noah
  - GHC Tag Team Championship (1 time, current) – with Manabu Soya
  - Global Tag League (2026) – with Manabu Soya
