= Takeshi Masada =

Japanese professional wrestler

- Masada in June 2026

Personal information
- Born: October 2, 2001 (age 25) Sakai, Osaka, Japan

Professional wrestling career
- Ring name: Takeshi Masada
- Billed height: 1.80 m (5 ft 11 in)
- Billed weight: 84 kg (185 lb)
- Trained by: Harashima
- Debut: August 14, 2022

Takeshi Masada (正田 壮史, Masada Takeshi; born October 2, 2001) is a Japanese professional wrestler working for the Japanese promotion DDT Pro-Wrestling where he is a former four-time Ironman Heavymetalweight Champion.

== Early life ==
In his second year of junior high school, he was inspired to join DDT Pro-Wrestling after watching Kota Ibushi matches, street wrestling and Yoshihiko matches. Since his high school didn't have a wrestling club, he took up Shorinji Kempo instead, and in August 2019, he ranked third at the Inter-High School Intercollegiate Championship in dantai embu with the Osaka Prefectural Semboku Senior High School team.

== Professional wrestling career ==
=== DDT Pro-Wrestling (2022–present) ===
Masada joined DDT in May 2022, after taking a leave of absence from college. Masada made his professional wrestling debut three months later at Road To Peter Pan In Korakuen Hall on August 14, 2022, where he fell short to his trainer Harashima in singles competition. This was the fastest debut in DDT history. On December 29, at Never Mind 2022, he was defeated by DDT founder Sanshiro Takagi. On December 31, Masada teamed up with Masato Tanaka and Takuya Nomura to compete in the annual Toshiwasure! Shuffle 6-Man Tag Team Tournament, an event co-promoted with Big Japan Pro Wrestling (BJW). They were eliminated in the first round by Harashima, Masashi Takeda and Yuki Ishikawa.

From January 29 to February 26, 2023, Masada competed in the B Block of the inaugural D Generations Cup. In his first tournament match at Sweet Dreams! 2023, he fell short to Keigo Nakamura. On February 11, at Yokohama Unlimited Vol. 1, he scored the first victory of his career against Yuki Ishida, earning two points in the process. On February 18, he beat Toy Kojima to qualify to the final. On February 21, at the Keiji Muto Grand Final Pro-Wrestling "Last" Love event, in a DDT showcase match, he teamed with Tetsuya Endo, Yuya Koroku, and Hideki Okatani to face The37Kamiina (Yuki Ueno, Mao, Shunma Katsumata, and Toy Kojima) in a losing effort. At Into The Fight 2023 on February 26, he defeated Yuya Koroku in the final of the D Generations Cup, thus earning a spot on the DDT Hollywood tour in March of that year. At Judgement 2023 on March 21, he defeated Hikaru Machida in singles competition. At DDT Goes Hollywood on March 30, Masada and Kazusada Higuchi defeated the team of Andrew Everett and Nick Wayne. The next day, at the GCW vs. DDT event, he teamed with Damnation T.A (Daisuke Sasaki and Kanon), and Sanshiro Takagi to face Gringo Loco, Wasted Youth (Dyln McKay and Marcus Mathers), and Jack Cartwheel in a losing effort. At Mega Max Bump 2023 on May 3, Masada teamed up with Ventvert Jack in a losing effort against Yuki Ueno and Yuni. Masada then made his first appearance in the King of DDT Tournament, where he fell short to Mao in the first round. At Wrestle Peter Pan 2023 on July 23, he defeated Kazuma Sumi. Masada is scheduled to team up with Rukiya against the teams of Burning (Yusuke Okada and Yuya Koroku), Damnnation T.A (Kanon and MJ Paul), and Naruki Doi and Kazuma Sumi.

=== New Japan Pro Wrestling (2023) ===
On the second night of New Japan Pro Wrestling's Destruction series on October 9, 2023, he teamed up with Takahiro Katori, Kazuma Sumi, Kengo, and Jun Masaoka in a losing effort against Chaos (Yoshi-Hashi, Toru Yano and Yoh), Tiger Mask and Ryusuke Taguchi.

== Championships and accomplishments ==
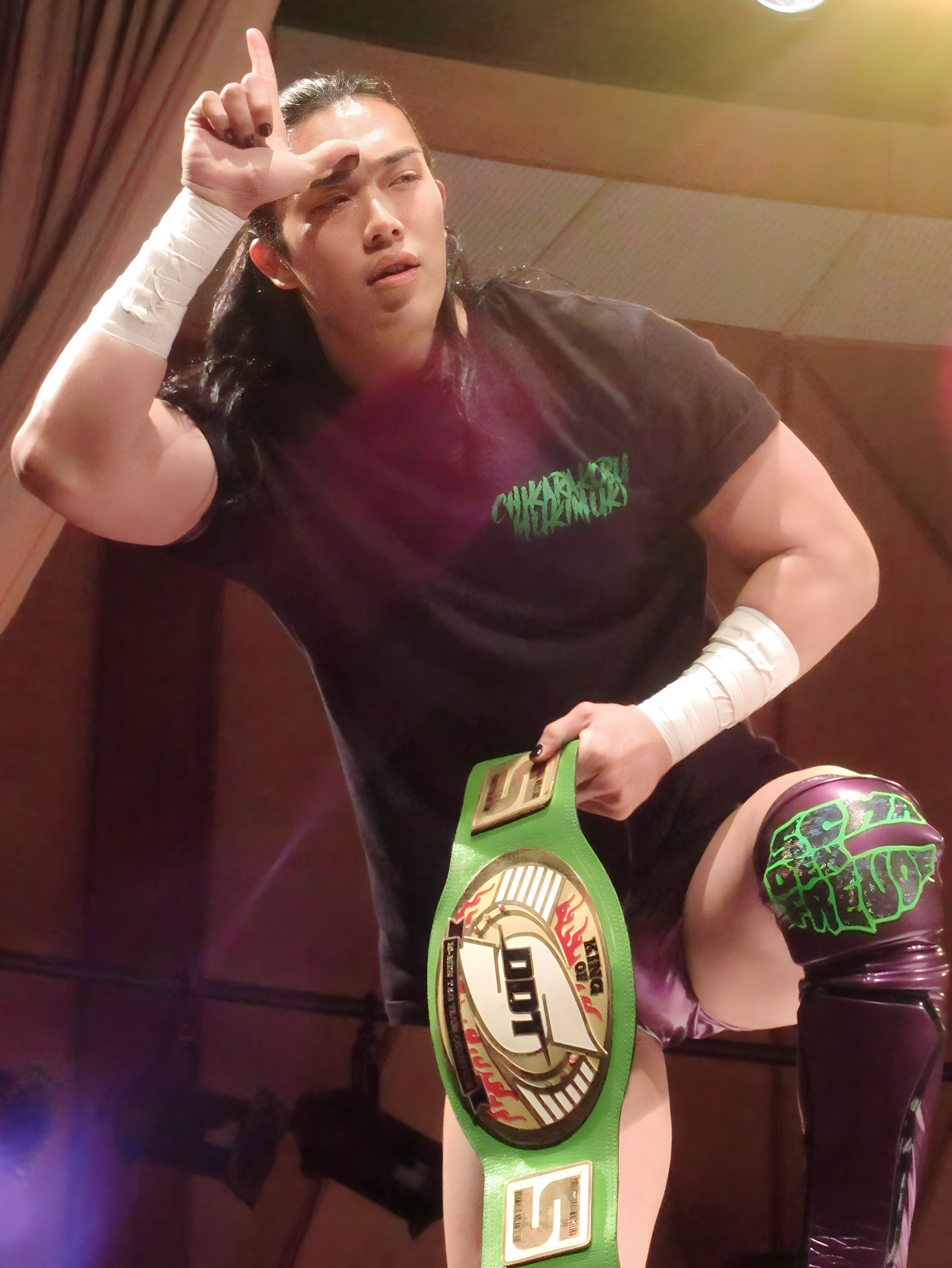
Masada is a one-time KO-D 10-Man Tag Team Champion.

- DDT Pro-Wrestling
  - KO-D Tag Team Championship (2 times, current) – with Chris Brookes (1) and Yuya Koroku
  - KO-D 6-Man Tag Team Championship (1 time) – with Yuya Koroku and Daichi Sato
  - KO-D 10-Man Tag Team Championship (1 time) – with Antonio Honda, Masahiro Takanashi, Takayuki Ueki and Mecha Mummy
  - Ironman Heavymetalweight Championship (4 times)
  - D Generations Cup (2023)
