= DDT Extreme Championship =

Professional wrestling championship

- The DDT Extreme Championship belt

Details
- Promotion: CyberFight
- Brand: DDT Pro-Wrestling
- Date established: November 23, 2006
- Current champion: Shunma Katsumata
- Date won: August 11, 2026

Other name
- DDT Extreme Division Championship
Statistics
- First champion: Mikami
- Most reigns: Danshoku Dino (9 reigns)
- Longest reign: Daisuke Sasaki (285 days)
- Shortest reign: Michael Nakazawa (1 day)
- Oldest champion: Jun Akiyama (53 years, 56 days)
- Youngest champion: Masa Takanashi (25 years, 31 days)
- Heaviest champion: Hoshitango (297 lb (135 kg))
- Lightest champion: LiLiCo (112 lb (51 kg))

The DDT Extreme Championship (Japanese: DDT EXTREME王座, Hepburn: Dī Dī Tī Ekusutorīmu Ōza) is a singles title in the Japanese professional wrestling promotion DDT Pro-Wrestling. The title was established in 2006 and it is mostly defended in stipulation matches, with the defending champion being given the right to choose the stipulation. The title has also been defended at events held by Union Pro Wrestling, one of DDT's former sub-brands. The current champion is Shunma Katsumata, who is in his fourth reign. He won the title by defeating Hideki Okatani in a Barbed wire Deathmatch at Wrestle Peter Pan on August 11, 2026.

== Title history ==
As of November 3, 2026, there have been a total of 65 reigns shared between 36 different champions with two vacancies.

Shunma Katsumata is the current champion in his fourth reign. He won the title by defeating Hideki Okatani in a Barbed wire Deathmatch at Wrestle Peter Pan in Tokyo, Japan, on August 11, 2026.

Key
No.	Overall reign number
Reign	Reign number for the specific champion
Days	Number of days held
Defenses	Number of successful defenses
+	Current reign is changing daily

No.	Champion	Championship change			Reign statistics			Notes	Ref.
No.	Champion	Date	Event	Location	Reign	Days	Defenses	Notes	Ref.
1	Mikami	November 23, 2006	God Bless DDT 2006	Tokyo, Japan	1	66	2	Was awarded the title after having defeated Sanshiro Takagi in a no disqualification match.	
2	Nosawa Rongai	January 28, 2007	Dramatic Rumble 2007	Tokyo, Japan	1	126	1		
3	Muscle Sakai	June 3, 2007	King of DDT 2007	Tokyo, Japan	1	84	1	This was an Anti-Noise Deathmatch.	
4	Nobutaka Araya	August 26, 2007	Pro-Wrestling Summit in Ariake	Tokyo, Japan	1	69	0	This was a three-way match also involving Abdullah Kobayashi.	
5	Danshoku Dino	November 3, 2007	Why? Because I'm Training!	Osaka, Japan	1	109	4	This was an EX Iron Man Match.	
6	Masa Takanashi	February 20, 2008	Non-Fix 2.20	Tokyo, Japan	1	137	1	This was a three-way match, also involving Kudo.	
7	Sanshiro Takagi	July 6, 2008	King of DDT 2008	Tokyo, Japan	1	202	8	This was a three-way match, where Sanshiro Takagi (as Françoise☆Takagi) defeated Masa Takanashi (as Masako Takanashi) and Hoshitango (as Hoshitanko).	
8	Hoshitango	January 24, 2009	Dramatic 2009 Special	Tokyo, Japan	1	127	1	This was a Table Crash Match.	
9	Danshoku Dino	May 31, 2009	Toyonaka Love Story 2009	Osaka, Japan	2	28	0	This was a No Low Blow three-way match, also involving Masa Takanashi.	
10	Michael Nakazawa	June 28, 2009	King of DDT 2009	Tokyo, Japan	1	1	0	This was a four-way match, also involving Antonio Honda and Rion Mizuki.	
11	Danshoku Dino	June 29, 2009	After King of DDT 2009	Tokyo, Japan	3	195	4	This was also for Dino's World Ōmori Championship.	
—	Vacated	January 10, 2010	—	—	—	—	—	Dino vacated the title due to health issues.	
12	Gentaro	January 10, 2010	New Year! Mōkoryū Daihōhi in Nagoya 2010	Nagoya, Japan	1	115	1	Defeated Mikami in a Nagoya-Style Hardcore Winner Eats Uiro Rules match to win the vacant title.	
13	Danshoku Dino	May 5, 2010	Tōkai Gorin Dai Bukai in Nagoya 2010	Nagoya, Japan	4	176	1	This was a "Gay or Straight" match.	
14	Kim Nan-pun	October 28, 2010	WWA Butterfly Effect	Ulsan, South Korea	1	67	0	This was a World Wrestling Association (WWA) promoted event.	
15	Isami Kodaka	January 3, 2011	Fuji, Falcon and Union	Tokyo, Japan	1	259	4	This was a Captain's Fall six-man tag team match, where Kim Nan-pun, Cao Zhang and Choun Shiryu faced Kodaka, Keita Yano and Survival Tobita.	
16	El Generico	September 19, 2011	Union Illusion: Dream	Tokyo, Japan	1	106	3	This was a hardcore match.	
17	Isami Kodaka	January 3, 2012	Fuji, Falcon and Union 2012	Tokyo, Japan	2	86	1	This was a Tonkachi, Ladders and Chairs match.	
18	Yuko Miyamoto	March 29, 2012	BJW × Union: Kind of a War, Kind of Not	Tokyo, Japan	1	111	1	This was a Light Tubes Deathmatch, held at an event co-promoted with Big Japan Pro Wrestling (BJW).	
19	Shuji Ishikawa	July 18, 2012	BJW × Union: Kind of a War, Kind Of	Tokyo, Japan	1	128	1	This was a Fluorescent Light Tubes, Roses and Ecosystem Deathmatch, held at an event co-promoted with Big Japan Pro Wrestling (BJW).	
20	Keisuke Ishii	November 23, 2012	Union Pro 7th Anniversary Show	Tokyo, Japan	1	52	1	This was a Lumberjack Deathmatch.	
21	Isami Kodaka	January 14, 2013	Happy New Year Union 2013	Tokyo, Japan	3	13	0		
22	Kenny Omega	January 27, 2013	Sweet Dreams! 2013	Tokyo, Japan	1	210	4	This match was also contested for Omega's KO-D Openweight Championship.	
23	Danshoku Dino	August 25, 2013	Summer Vacation Memories 2013	Tokyo, Japan	5	29	1	This was a T-back Table match.	
24	Antonio Honda	September 23, 2013	Yokohama Twilight 2013: Autumn	Yokohama, Japan	1	42	1	This was a Three-Way Three-Round match, also involving Kenny Omega, in which each round was contested under different rules (Over the Top Rope match, Silent match, Kiss My Cock match, then a Kiss My Ass tie-breaker match).	
25	Harashima	November 4, 2013	Osaka Bay Blues Special 2013	Osaka, Japan	1	117	4	This match was also contested for Harashima's KO-D Openweight and Ironman Heavymetalweight Championships.	
26	Danshoku Dino	March 1, 2014	Road to Ryōgoku in Hiroshima: Dramatic Dream Toukasan	Hiroshima, Japan	6	69	1	This was a New York Style Rules match, in which both wrestlers had to kiss their opponent for the whole three-count of a pinfall in order to win.	
27	Masa Takanashi	May 9, 2014	Shinjuku May 9 Drama	Tokyo, Japan	2	16	0	This was a Three Times Fall match.	
28	Makoto Oishi	May 25, 2014	Friendship, Effort, Victory! in Nagoya 2014	Nagoya, Japan	1	48	0	This was an Idol Lumberjack match. Masa Takanashi's lumberjacks were wrestlers from Gatoh Move Pro Wrestling; Oishi's lumberjacks were the members of Shizukaze & Kizuna.	
29	Danshoku Dino	July 12, 2014	DDT Pro-Wrestling Road to Saitama Super Arena 5	Kawagoe, Japan	7	78	2	This was an Idol Lumberjack match. Makoto Oishi's lumberjacks were the members of Shizukaze & Kizuna; Dino's lumberjack was Yoshiko.	
30	Akito	September 28, 2014	DDT Dramatic General Election 2014 Final Voting Day: Last Request Special	Tokyo, Japan	1	140	5	This was a nobodyknows+ rules match. Akito won by confessing his love for Danshoku Dino after pinning him for a three-count; this was the hidden rule of the match, drawn at random by the referee.	
31	Shiori Asahi	February 15, 2015	Saitama Super DDT 2015	Saitama, Japan	1	42	0	This was a Rules Rumble match, in which the rules changed every 90 seconds.	
32	Akito	March 29, 2015	Judgement 2015	Tokyo, Japan	2	112	3	This was a 10-minute Total Count match.	
33	Antonio Honda	July 19, 2015	Road to Ryōgoku 2015	Tokyo, Japan	2	132	3	This was a Fall Into the Hell match, in which the ropes and turbuckle pads were removed from the ring, and being thrown out of the ring resulted in an immediate loss.	
34	Kendo Kashin	November 28, 2015	Osaka Octopus 2015	Osaka, Japan	1	114	3	This was a UWF Rules + 3-Count Pinfall + 20-Countout Hybrid Rules match.	
35	Super Sasadango Machine	March 21, 2016	Judgement 2016: DDT 19th Anniversary	Tokyo, Japan	2	69	2	This was an Ultimate Royal Barbed Wire PowerPoint No Power Blast PWF Rules match. Previously won the title under the ring name Muscle Sakai.	
36	LiLiCo	May 29, 2016	Audience 2016	Tokyo, Japan	1	91	1		
37	Danshoku Dino	August 28, 2016	Ryōgoku Peter Pan 2016	Tokyo, Japan	8	98	3	This was a Watase Contra Watase match, in which the winner won the love of Mizuki Watase.	
38	Jun Kasai	December 4, 2016	Osaka Octopus 2016	Osaka, Japan	1	106	3	This was a Dōyama Hardcore match.	
39	Daisuke Sasaki	March 20, 2017	Judgement 2017: DDT 20th Anniversary	Saitama, Japan	1	285	8	This was a hardcore match.	
40	Yuko Miyamoto	December 30, 2017	Damnation Unlawful Assembly Vol. 2	Tokyo, Japan	2	120	3	This was a two out of three falls hardcore match.	
41	Harashima	April 29, 2018	Max Bump 2018	Tokyo, Japan	2	182	3		
42	Shinya Aoki	October 28, 2018	DDT Live! MajiManji Korakuen Hall Special!!	Tokyo, Japan	1	112	1		
43	Harashima	February 17, 2019	Judgement 2019: DDT 22nd Anniversary	Tokyo, Japan	3	70	1	This was billed as a "Mutual Pride Rules" Rules match, but was fought under regular rules.	
44	Antonio Honda	April 28, 2019	Max Bump 2019	Tokyo, Japan	3	27	0	This was a Panty☆Hunt Tiger Cub Rope Deathmatch, in which both wrestlers were tied together via a tiger rope with a stuffed tiger toy attached to it, and the winner was the first to remove the other's panties.	
45	Akito	May 25, 2019	Golden DDT Theater 2019	Tokyo, Japan	3	70	1	This was a Yogi Yogi Deathmatch, during which Trans-Am★Hiroshi and Konaka=Pahalwhan would meditate and practice yoga outside the ring and would attack both wrestlers whenever they were disturbed.	
46	Jiro "Ikemen" Kuroshio	August 3, 2019	Fighting Beer Garden 2019: DDT	Tokyo, Japan	1	57	1	This was a Watermelon Splitting match, in which both wrestlers had to avoid damaging a watermelon; if they scored a one-count pinfall, they were given a chance to attempt to split the watermelon with a shovel while blindfolded and dizzy as a way to win the match.	
47	Harashima	September 29, 2019	Who's Gonna Top? 2019	Tokyo, Japan	4	164	3	This was a three-way elimination match also involving Tetsuya Endo.	
48	Shinya Aoki	March 11, 2020	DDT Live! Unnecessary Street Electric Explosion Pro-Wrestling in Saitama Super Arena	Saitama, Japan	2	237	5	This was a Blindfolded Breast Covering Deathmatch, in which both wrestlers were blindfolded and the winner was the first to remove the other's brassiere.	
49	Sanshiro Takagi	November 3, 2020	Ultimate Party 2020	Tokyo, Japan	2	96	10	This was a Weapon Rumble match.	
50	Shunma Katsumata	February 7, 2021	Steam Natural Hot Spring Pro-Wrestling	Kumamoto, Japan	1	35	1	This was a three-way Falls Count Anywhere 45-Minute Iron Man match also involving Batten×Burabura.	
51	Chris Brookes	March 14, 2021	Day Dream Believer 2021	Tokyo, Japan	1	123	2	This was a Barbed Wire Coffin Deathmatch.	
52	Shinya Aoki	July 15, 2021	Summer Vacation Tour in Shinjuku 2021	Tokyo, Japan	3	214	5	This was a Winner-Takes-All No Disqualification and No Submission match in which Aoki's Ironman Heavymetalweight Championship was also on the line.	
53	Yuki "Sexy" Iino	February 14, 2022	DDT Free February: Ultimate Tag League 2022 in Shinjuku!!	Tokyo, Japan	1	152	2	This was a Turkish Oil Wrestling match.	
54	Akito	July 16, 2022	Summer Vacation 2022 Tour in Nagoya	Nagoya, Japan	4	29	0	This was a 3-on-1 handicap match with Sanshiro Takagi as special referee in which Yuki "Sexy" Iino teamed with Danshoku "Dandy" Dino and Yumehito "Fantastic" Imanari.	
55	Joey Janela	August 14, 2022	Road to Peter Pan 2022 in Korakuen: Let Your Voices Be Heard	Tokyo, Japan	1	112	4	This was a One Light Tube Ippon Deathmatch, in which both wrestlers had to avoid breaking a lone light tube.	
56	Jun Akiyama	December 4, 2022	D-Oh Grand Prix 2022 the Final	Tokyo, Japan	1	150	4	This was a Tables, Ladders & Chairs match.	
57	Shunma Katsumata	May 3, 2023	Mega Max Bump 2023 in Yokohama	Yokohama, Japan	2	19	1	This was a Toys, Ladders & Chairs match.	
—	Vacated	May 22, 2023	—	—	—	—	—	Katsumata vacated the title after having suffered a broken foot during his first defense of the title the day before.	
58	Kazuki Hirata	June 25, 2023	What Are You Doing 2023	Tokyo, Japan	1	217	4	Defeated Yoshihiko and Mao in a three-way match to win the vacant title.	
59	Shunma Katsumata	January 28, 2024	Sweet Dreams! 2024	Tokyo, Japan	3	245	5	This was a Toy Kojima Challenge Deathmatch, in which both wrestlers had to score two-count pinfalls, but each fall would only count if Toy Kojima could then successfully pass a random challenge backstage.	
60	Akito	September 29, 2024	Dramatic Infinity 2024	Tokyo, Japan	5	21	0	This was a One Light Tube Ippon Tag Team Deathmatch in which Akito teamed up with Yuni to defeat Katsumata and Kazuma Sumi.	
61	Danshoku Dino	October 20, 2024	God Bless DDT 2024	Tokyo, Japan	9	151	2	This was a nobodyknows+ rules match. Akito lost by speaking English; this was the hidden rule of the match, drawn at random by the referee.	
62	Super Sasadango Machine	March 20, 2025	Judgement 2025	Tokyo, Japan	3	87	2	This was a Loser Joins DDT match with Amon Tsurumi as special observer. As a result, Danshoku Dino's dog Haku had to "officially join DDT".	
63	To-y	June 15, 2025	Echigo Power Slam	Niigata, Japan	1	280	7	This was a two out of three falls match.	
64	Hideki Okatani	March 22, 2026	Judgement 2026	Tokyo, Japan	1	142	4	This was a If You Want To Use The Bamboo Sword Make Them Laugh! Staring Contest Punishment Bamboo Sword Death Match.	
65	Shunma Katsumata	August 11, 2026	Wrestle Peter Pan	Tokyo, Japan	4	84+	3	This was a Barbed Wire Death Match.	

== Combined reigns ==
As of November 3, 2026.

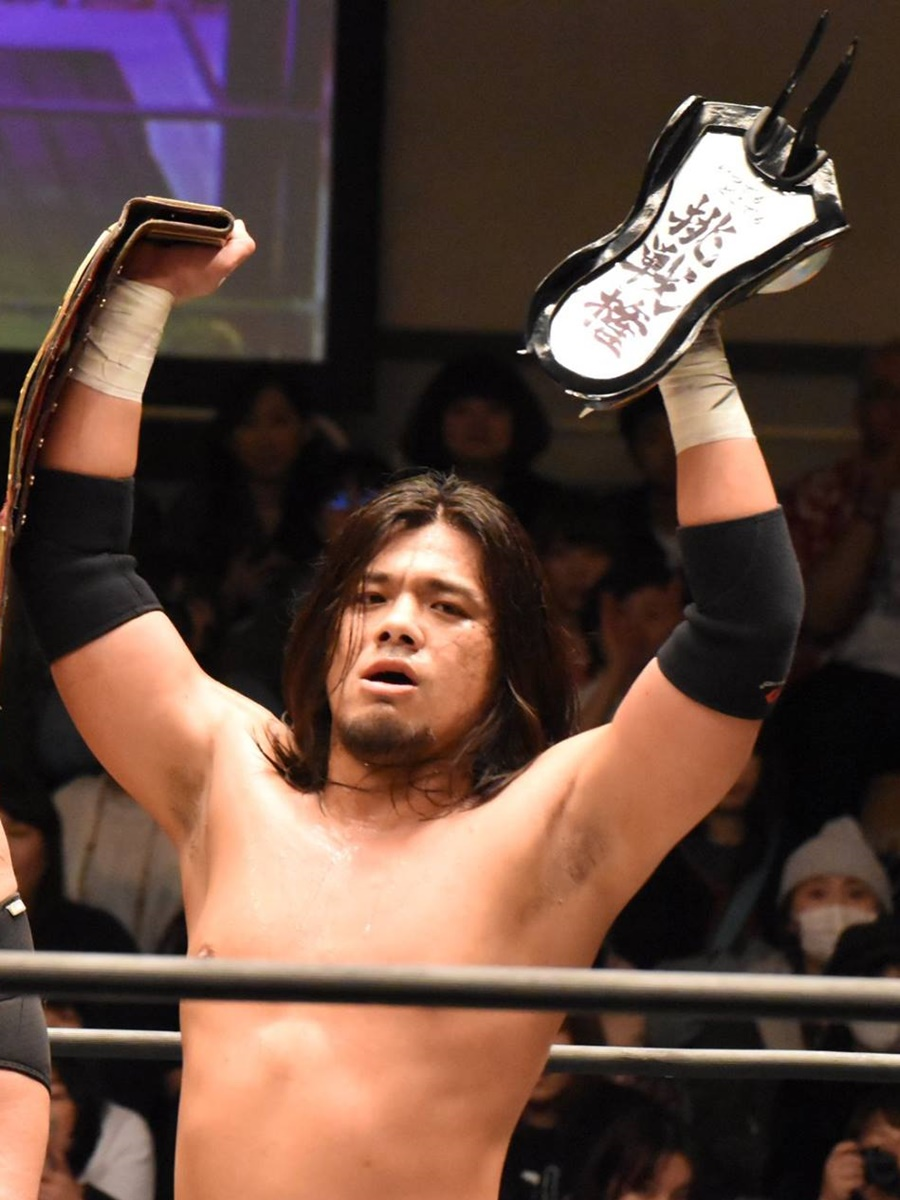
Record longest reign champion at 285 days, Daisuke Sasaki.

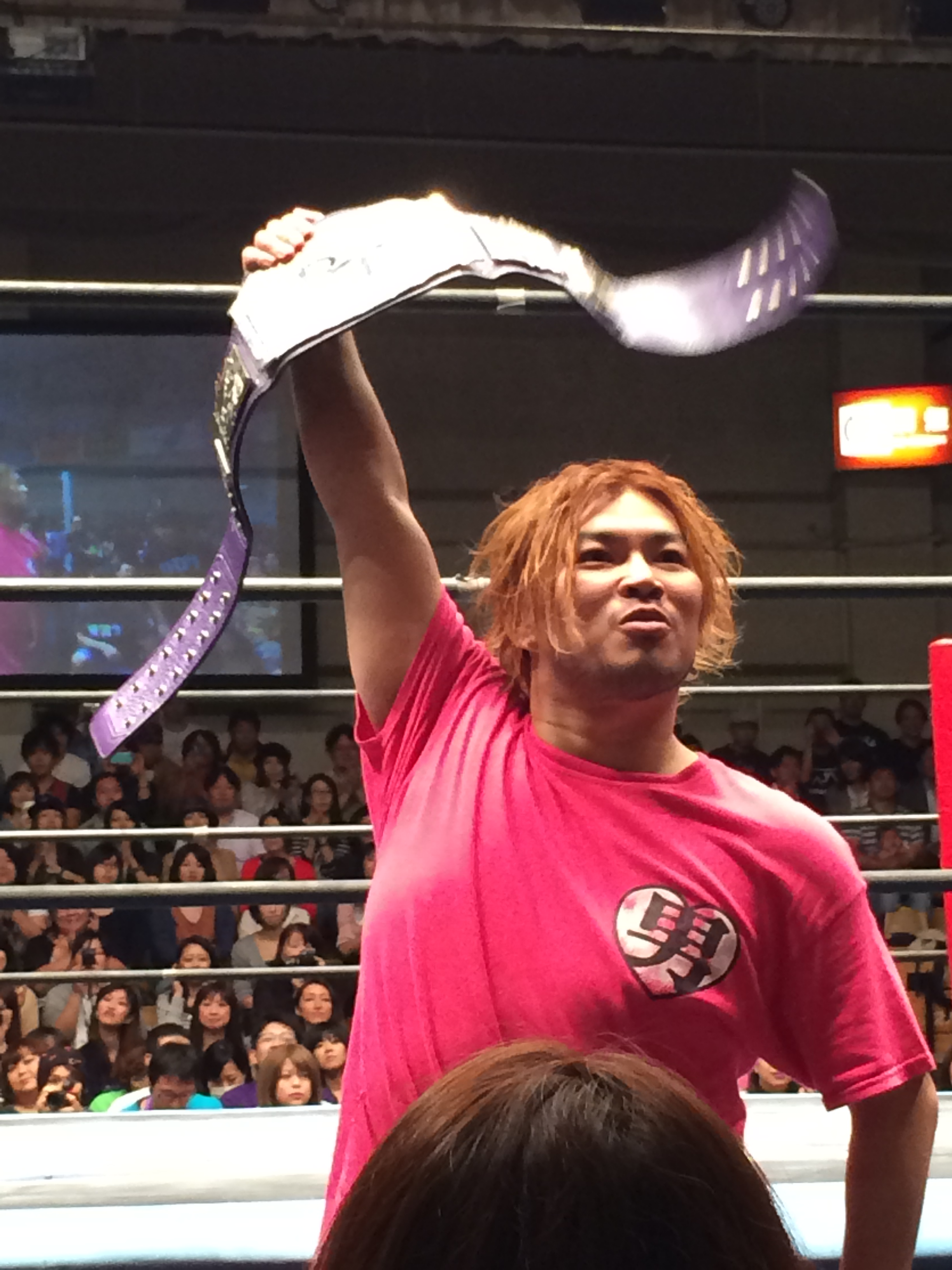
Record nine-time and longest combined reigning champion at 933 days, Danshoku Dino.

†	Indicates the current champions

Rank	Wrestler	No. of reigns	Combined defenses	Combined days
1	Danshoku Dino	9	18	933
2	Shinya Aoki	3	11	563
3	Harashima	4	11	533
4	Shunma Katsumata †	4	10	383+
5	Akito	5	9	372
6	Muscle Sakai/Super Sasadango Machine	3	5	368
7	Isami Kodaka	3	5	358
8	Sanshiro Takagi	2	18	298
9	Daisuke Sasaki	1	8	285
10	To-y	1	7	280
11	Yuko Miyamoto	2	4	231
12	Kazuki Hirata	1	4	217
13	Kenny Omega	1	4	210
14	Antonio Honda	3	4	201
15	Masa Takanashi	2	1	153
16	Yuki "Sexy" Iino	1	2	152
17	Jun Akiyama	1	4	150
18	Hideki Okatani	1	4	142
19	Shuji Ishikawa	1	1	128
20	Hoshitango	1	1	127
21	Nosawa Rongai	1	1	126
22	Chris Brookes	1	2	123
23	Gentaro	1	1	115
24	Kendo Kashin	1	3	114
25	Joey Janela	1	4	112
26	El Generico	1	3	106
26	Jun Kasai	1	3	106
28	LiLiCo	1	1	91
29	Nobutaka Araya	1	0	69
30	Kim Nan-pun	1	0	67
31	Mikami	1	2	66
32	Jiro "Ikemen" Kuroshio	1	1	57
33	Keisuke Ishii	1	1	52
34	Makoto Oishi	1	0	48
35	Shiori Asahi	1	0	42
36	Michael Nakazawa	1	0	1

== See also ==
- Professional wrestling in Japan
