= Judgement (1997) =

1997 DDT Pro-Wrestling event

- Promotion: DDT Pro-Wrestling
- Date: March 25, 1997
- City: Tokyo, Japan
- Venue: Hibiya Radio City

Judgement chronology
← Previous; First	Next → 2

Judgement (Japanese: 審判～JUDGEMENT～, Hepburn: Shinpan Jajimento), also known as DDT Pre-Launching Battle Judgement (DDTプレ旗揚げ戦 Judgement, DDT pure hataage-sen jajjimento), and sequentially as Judgement 1, was a professional wrestling event promoted by DDT Pro-Wrestling (DDT). It took place on March 25, 1997, in Tokyo, Japan, at the Hibiya Radio City. It was the first event hosted by DDT and the first instalment of the Judgement series that would go on to serve as DDT's anniversary event.

== Storylines ==
Judgement featured four professional wrestling matches that involved different wrestlers from pre-existing scripted feuds and storylines. Wrestlers portrayed villains, heroes, or less distinguishable characters in the scripted events that built tension and culminated in a wrestling match or series of matches.

== Results ==
No.	Results	Stipulations	Times
1	Asian Cougar defeated Kyohei Mikami by pinfall	Singles match	9:17
2	Phantom Funakoshi defeated Chotaro Kamoi by submission	Singles match	12:12
3	Hiroshi Shimada, Super Judist and Kazunori Yoshida defeated Miracle Power, Raioh and Kosei Maeda by pinfall	Six-man tag team match	20:08
4	Super Uchuu Power and Kamen Shooter Super Rider defeated Sanshiro Takagi and Kazushige Nosawa by submission	Tag team match	17:55
