= Kyohei Mikami =

Japanese wrestler (born 1973)

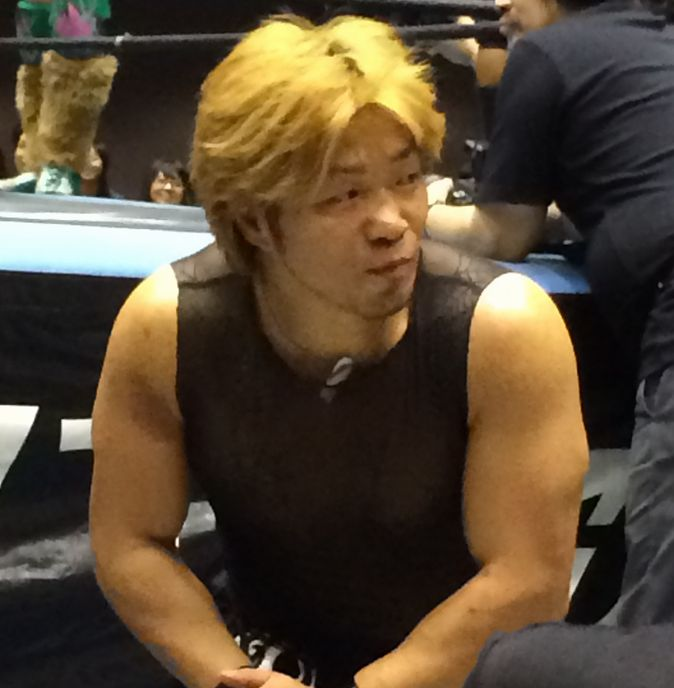

Personal information
- Born: December 28, 1973 (age 52) Hamada, Shimane

Professional wrestling career
- Ring names: Kyohei Mikami; Mijami; Mikami; Mikan; Mecha Mummy Lite
- Billed height: 1.63 m (5 ft 4 in)
- Billed weight: 73 kg (161 lb)
- Trained by: Gran Hamada; The Great Sasuke; Jinsei Shinzaki
- Debut: October 17, 1996

Kyohei Mikami (三上 恭平, Mikami Kyōhei; born December 28, 1973), known by his stage name Mikami (stylized as MIKAMI), is a Japanese professional wrestler. He is best known for his work for Dramatic Dream Team both as a singles wrestler and with Thanomsak Toba in a tag team called Suicide Boyz.

== Career ==
Coming from a background in gymnastics and Greco-Roman wrestling, Mikami started training professional wrestling in Universal Lucha Libre in 1993. After passing another tentative year in Michinoku Pro Wrestling, he eventually joined Pro Wrestling Crusaders, where he served as a referee before debuting in 1996 against Nosawa Rongai. In 1997, he followed Sanshiro Takagi to his recently founded Dramatic Dream Team.

=== Dramatic Dream Team (1997–2015) ===
Mikami competed in DDT from its first event. Initially under his real name and later in all caps as Mikami, he developed the gimmick of an aloof high-flyer, nicknamed "Suicide Boy", who carried a metal ladder to the ring to use it as both a weapon and a jumping platform. In April 2000, after Mikami's return to Japan from a stint in International Wrestling Association, he formed the tag team Suicide Boyz with Thanomsak Toba. Taking inspiration from The Hardy Boyz, which included sleeves similar to Jeff Hardy's, they won the KO-D Tag Team Championship three times.

In 2005, he launched Cruiser's Game, his own brand within Dramatic Dream Team, which focused on junior heavyweight action. It saw the participation of names like Kota Ibushi, Kaz Hayashi, Taka Michinoku, Cima and The Great Sasuke. Cruiser's Game had its final event in 2013, hosting a tournament that was won by Tatsuhito Takaiwa. Two years later, Mikami announced he was leaving DDT.

Mikami made his return to DDT on March 20, 2022, at Judgement 2022: DDT 25th Anniversary where he teamed up with Poison Sawada Julie, Akarangers (Takashi Sasaki and Gentaro and his Suicide Boyz tag partner Thanomsak Toba, being accompanied to the ring by Naomi Susan to defeat Toru Owashi, Antonio Honda, Kazuki Hirata and Yoshihiko for the KO-D 10-Man Tag Team Championship.

== Championships and accomplishments ==
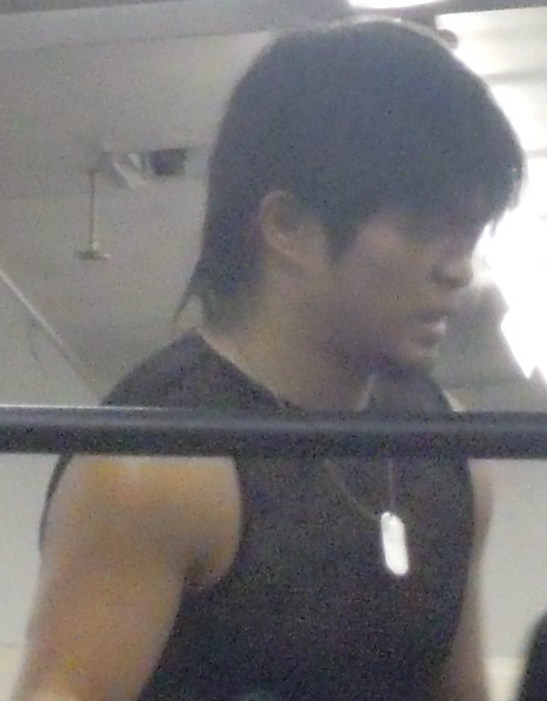
Mikami in 2010.

- Apache Pro-Wrestling Army

- WEW Tag Team Championship (1 time) – with Rion Mizuki

- Dramatic Dream Team

- DDT Extreme Championship (1 time)
- Ironman Heavymetalweight Championship (12 times)
- KO-D Openweight Championship (3 times)
- KO-D Tag Team Championship (6 times) – with Super Uchuu Power (2), Takashi Sasaki (1), Thanomsak Toba (2) and Tatsumi Fujinami (1)
- KO-D 10-Man Tag Team Championship (1 time) – with Poison Sawada Julie, Gentaro, Takashi Sasaki and Thanomsak Toba
- KO-D Tag League – with Super Uchuu Power (2001) and Thanomsak Toba (2002)
- KO-D Tag Team Title League (2008) – with Thanomsak Toba
- Takechi Six Man Tag Scramble Cup – with Kudo and Shiima Xion (2006)

- International Wrestling Association

- IWA World Junior Heavyweight Championship (1 time)

- Pro-Wrestling A-Team

- WEW Junior Heavyweight Championship (1 time)
- WEW Tag Team Championship (1 time) – with Hasegawa

- Pro Wrestling Kageki

- Hakata Light Heavyweight Championship (1 time)
