= Toy Kojima =

Japanese professional wrestler

To-y
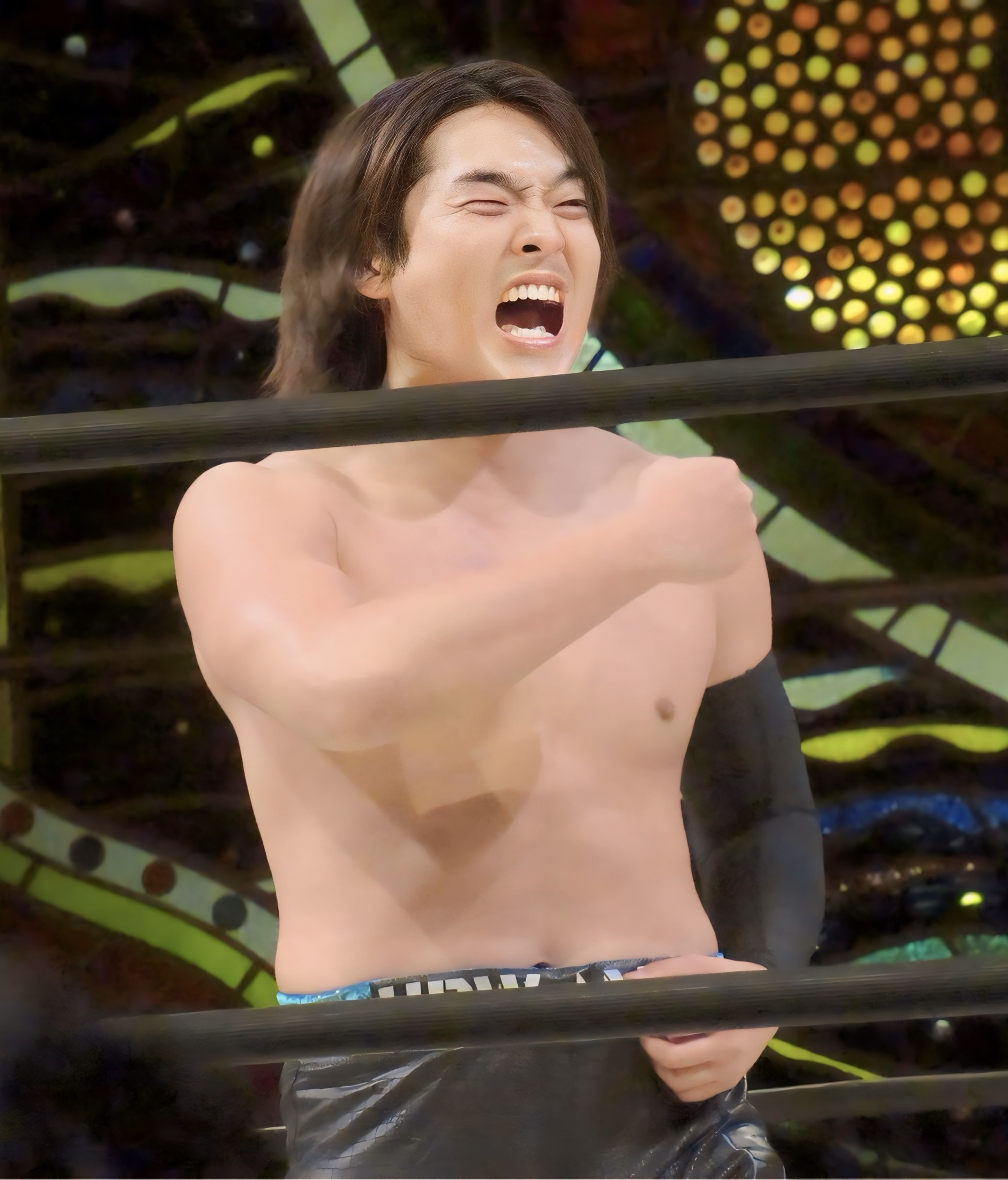
- Kojima in September 2023

Personal information
- Born: December 8, 1999 (age 26) Saitama Prefecture, Japan

Professional wrestling career
- Ring names: Toui Kojima; Toi Kojima; To-y; Toy Kojima; Great Koji
- Billed height: 1.77 m (5 ft 10 in)
- Billed weight: 80 kg (176 lb)
- Trained by: Jun Akiyama
- Debut: December 27, 2020

Japanese name
- Kanji: 小嶋 斗偉
- Hiragana: こじま とうい
- Katakana: コジマ トウイ
Transcriptions
- Romanization: Kojima Tōi

Toi Kojima (小嶋斗偉, Kojima Tōi; born December 8, 1999) is a Japanese professional wrestler who works for DDT Pro-Wrestling under the ring name To-y, where he is a member of the The37Kamiina stable.

== Professional wrestling career ==
=== DDT Pro-Wrestling (2021–present) ===
After having fought two exhibition matches in June and December 2020, Kojima made his official debut in DDT Pro-Wrestling, on December 27, in the opening match of the D-Oh Grand Prix 2021 final event, losing to Hideki Okatani.

Kojima's first victory came at Into The Fight 2021, on February 28, 2021, when he and Yusuke Okada defeated the team of Keigo Nakamura and Yuki Ueno. On June 6, at CyberFight Festival 2021, during his match teaming with Yuki Iino against Junta Miyawaki and Kinya Okada, he dislocated his left elbow. He made his return on November 3, at the D-Oh Grand Prix 2021 II event at the Ota City General Gymnasium. At the event, he teamed with Yuya Koroku and defeated Hideki Okatani and Yuki Ishida. On November 6, Kojima joined the The37Kamiina stable.

On June 25, 2022, during the Dramatic Dream Tour in Yokohama, he teamed with his stablemates Mao, Yuki Ueno and Shunma Katsumata, and also Shinya Aoki to defeat the DDT Legend Army (Poison Sawada Julie, Takashi Sasaki, Gentaro, Mikami and Thanomsak Toba) and win his first title, the KO-D 10-Man Tag Team Championship.

On January 14, 2024, Kojima teamed with Atsushi Onita to win the All Asia Tag Team Championship from Eruption (Yukio Sakaguchi and Hideki Okatani) in an Electric Blast Bat & Boards Deathmatch. On February 14, Kojima announced he was taking up the ring name To-y. He explained that his parents were fans of Atsushi Kamijo and named him after Kamijo's manga series To-y, so he will now be using the ring name to honor it and bring more attention to pro-wrestling.

On June 15, 2025 at Echigo Power Slam, To-y won his first singles title after defeating Super Sasadango Machine for the DDT Extreme Championship in a 2-out of-3 Fall match.

== Professional wrestling persona ==
Kojima's entrance theme in DDT is "All I Want" by The Offspring.

== Championships and accomplishments ==
- All Japan Pro Wrestling

- All Asia Tag Team Championship (1 time) – with Atsushi Onita

- DDT Pro-Wrestling

- DDT Extreme Championship (1 time)
- Ironman Heavymetalweight Championship (4 times)
- KO-D 10-Man Tag Team Championship (2 times) – with Mao, Yuki Ueno, Shunma Katsumata and Shinya Aoki (1) and Keigo Nakamura, Kazuma Sumi, Yuki Ishida and Yuya Koroku (1)
- KO-D 6-Man Tag Team Championship (1 time) – with Yuki Ueno and Kaisei Takechi
- KO-D Tag Team Championship (1 time) – with Mao
- D Generations Cup (2024)

- Pro Wrestling Illustrated
  - Ranked No. 415 of the top 500 singles wrestlers in the PWI 500 in 2025
