= Shunma Katsumata =

Japanese wrestler (born 1992)

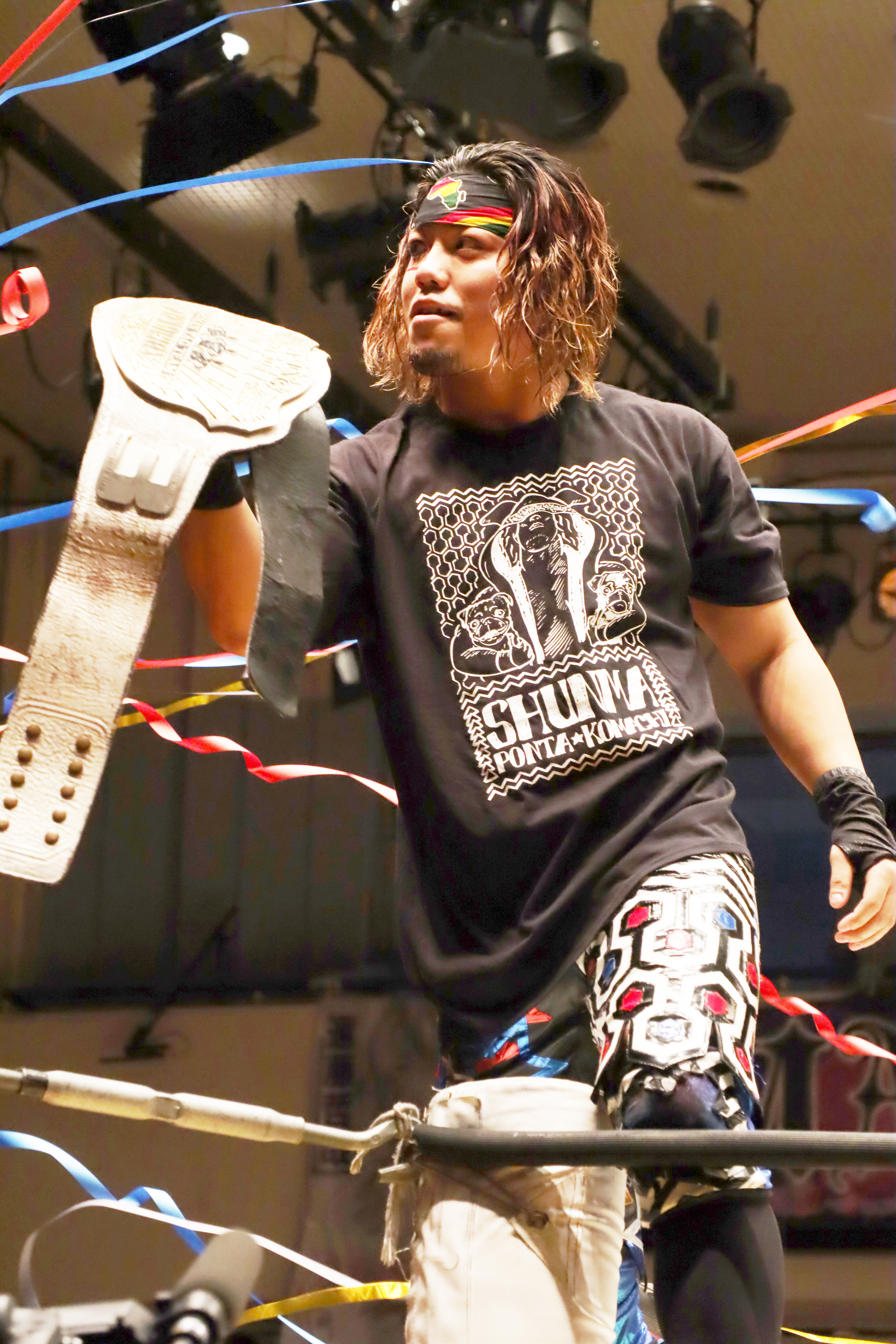
- Katsumata in 2019

Personal information
- Born: September 12, 1992 (age 34) Kashiwa, Chiba, Japan

Professional wrestling career
- Ring name(s): Carousel Shun; Shunma Katsumata
- Billed height: 1.67 m (5 ft 6 in)
- Billed weight: 75 kg (165 lb)
- Trained by: Yasu Urano
- Debut: 2014

Shunma Katsumata (勝俣瞬馬, Katsumata Shunma; born September 12, 1992) is a Japanese professional wrestler, currently working for the Japanese professional wrestling promotion DDT Pro-Wrestling (DDT), where he is the current DDT Extreme Champion in his fourth reign.

== Professional wrestling career ==
=== Independent circuit (2014–present) ===
Katsumata is known for tenures with various Japanese professional wrestling promotions. On October 10, 2017 at Pro Wrestling Noah's The Great Voyage 2017 In Yokohama, he teamed up with Mao as a part of New Wrestling Aidoru and unsuccessfully challenged Ratel's (Hayata and Yo-Hey) for the GHC Junior Heavyweight Tag Team Championship. He took part in a cross-over event between DDT and Sendai Girls' Pro Wrestling, at the DDT/Sendai Girls All Out X show on June 24, 2019 where he teamed up with Konosuke Takeshita and Yuki Iino as part of ALL OUT to defeat Dash Chisako, Chihiro Hashimoto and Meiko Satomura in a six-person intergender tag team match to win the KO-D 6-Man Tag Team Championship. On March 4, 2018, he worked a match during the Wrestle-1's Cherry Blossom Tour in which he lost to Jiro Kuroshio. He also worked for Big Japan Pro Wrestling, competing in various death matches such as a 8-man fluorescent lighttube match at BJW Last Buntai ~ Goodbye Yokohama Buntai on September 6, 2020 where he teamed up with Yuki Ishikawa and the 3rd Generation Chimidoro Brothers (Masaya Takahashi & Toshiyuki Sakuda) in a losing effort against Abdullah Kobayashi, Jaki Numazawa, Ryuji Ito and Takashi Sasaki.

=== DDT Pro-Wrestling (2014–present) ===
Katsumata made his professional wrestling debut at Judgement on March 21, 2014 in a five-minute time limit dark match against Suguru Miyatake which ended in a draw. During his time in DDT Pro-Wrestling, he participated in notable matches such as a 34-man tag team match in which he teamed up with Bernard Ackah, DJ Nira, Daisuke Sasaki, Kota Ibushi, Suguru Miyatake, Gota Ihashi, Michael Nakazawa, Saki Akai, Kudo, Masa Takanashi, Yukio Sakaguchi, Akito, Harashima, Yasu Urano, Super Sasadango Machine and Tomomitsu Matsunaga to defeat Brahman Kei, Brahman Shu, Gorgeous Matsuno, Antonio Honda, Konosuke Takeshita, Tetsuya Endo, Hoshitango, Kota Umeda, Makoto Oishi, Mikami, Shuji Ishikawa, Kazuki Hirata, Sanshiro Takagi, Toru Owashi, Shigehiro Irie, Soma Takao and Yoshihiko at New Year's Gift Special 2015. He also won the Ironman Heavymetalweight Championship for the first time in a battle royal at Saitama Super DDT on February 15, 2015, dethroning the previous champion, Kubo Yumakoto. On February 28, 2016 at Into The Fight, he teamed up with Kazusada Higuchi and Kouki Iwasaki to capture the KO-D 6-Man Tag Team Championship from T2Hii (Kazusada Higuchi, Sanshiro Takagi and Toru Owashi). Katsumata won the six-man titles with two other teams. Once with New Wrestling Aidoru (Makoto Oishi and Mao) at the DDT 22nd Anniversary on March 20, 2017 in a three-way tag team match also involving his former team partners Kazusada Higuchi, Kouki Iwasaki and Mizuki Watase; and once with All Out (Konosuke Takeshita and Yuki Iino) at What Are You Doing on June 24, 2018 after defeating Kota Umeda, Koju Takeda and Yuki Ueno. At Yukemuri Natural Hot Spring Pro Wrestling on February 28, Kastumata won the DDT Extreme Championship in a three-way Falls Count Anywhere 45-minute Iron Man match also involving the champion Sanshiro Takagi and Batten×Burabura. At Judgement 2020: DDT 23rd Anniversary on March 20, 2020, he teamed up with Hideki Okatani, falling short to Keigo Nakamura and Naomi Yoshimura.

== Championships and accomplishments ==
- DDT Pro-Wrestling

- DDT Extreme Championship (4 times, current)
- Ironman Heavymetalweight Championship (22 times)
- KO-D 6-Man Tag Team Championship (5 times) – with Kazusada Higuchi and Kouki Iwasaki (1), Makoto Oishi and Mao (1), Konosuke Takeshita and Akito (1), Konosuke Takeshita and Yuki Iino (1) and Yuni and Kazuma Sumi (1)
- KO-D 10-Man Tag Team Championship (1 time) – with Mao, Yuki Ueno, Toui Kojima and Shinya Aoki
- KO-D Tag Team Championship (3 times) – with Konosuke Takeshita (1) and Mao (2)
- Ultimate Tag League (2021) – with Konosuke Takeshita

- Pro Wrestling Illustrated
  - Ranked No. 394 of the top 500 singles wrestlers in the PWI 500 in 2023
