= Akito (wrestler) =

Japanese professional wrestler

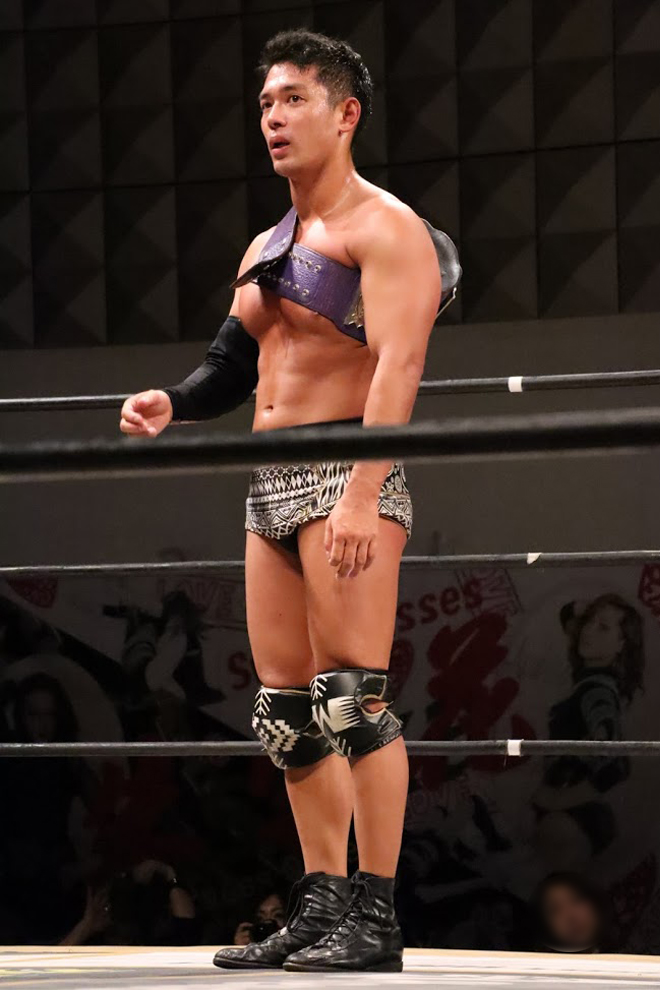
- Akito in 2020

Personal information
- Born: Akito Nishigaki; February 28, 1987 (age 39) Nagoya, Japan

Professional wrestling career
- Ring names: Akihiko Nishigaki; Akiko; Akito; Akito "Co-Chin" Nishigaki; Cao Zhang
- Billed height: 1.75 m (5 ft 9 in)
- Billed weight: 84 kg (185 lb)
- Debut: 2009

Akito Nishigaki (西垣彰人, Nishigaki Akito) is a Japanese professional wrestler, better known by his ring name Akito (彰人, Akito). He is currently working for the Japanese professional wrestling promotion DDT Pro-Wrestling (DDT).

== Professional wrestling career ==
=== Independent circuit (2009-present) ===
Nishigaki made his professional wrestling debut at Sportiva It's Saturday Pro DX !! ~ Tsurumai Muso 09 from November 28, 2009, an event hosted by the Sportiva Entertainment promotion, where he scored a defeat in front of Kekumo. He worked for other promotions such as Kaientai Dojo, where he worked alongside Michio Kageyama and Toru Sugiura to unsuccessfully challenge Silence (Daigoro Kashiwa, Kaji Tomato and Marines Mask) for the Chiba Six Man Tag Team Championship at Kaientai Dojo's 10th Anniversary on February 2, 2012. He also wrestled in cross-over events held between Dramatic Dream Team, Big Japan Pro Wrestling and Kaientai Dojo such as the BJW/ DDT/K-Dojo: Sapporo Pro-Wrestling Festa 2014 on October 14, where he teamed up with Ryuichi Kawakami and Ryuichi Sekine in a losing effort to Ryuji Ito, Harashima and Kengo Mashimo in a six-man tag team match. On November 28, 2016, Nishigaki worked a match for Tokyo Gurentai at the Tokyo Dream 2016 show where he teamed up with Cima and Masato Tanaka and scored a victory against Minoru Fujita, Mazada and Kikuzawa.

=== DDT Pro-Wrestling (2010-present) ===
Nishigaki worked most of his career in DDT under the name Akito. He is a DDT Extreme Champion, title which he won the first time after defeating Danshoku Dino in a nobody knows rules match at DDT Dramatic General Election 2014 on September 13. He was a part of the All Out stable, and alongside his fellow stablemates Konosuke Takeshita and Diego, defeated Damnation (Daisuke Sasaki, Mad Paulie and Shuji Ishikawa to win the KO-D 6-Man Tag Team Championship at DDT Shin-Kiba, I Came Back! from November 2, 2017. Akito won the championship on two more occasions under the stable, first with Konosuke Takeshita and Shunma Katsumata after defeating Chihiro Hashimoto, Dash Chisako and Meiko Satomura at the DDT/Sendai Girls All Out X Sendai Girls Pro Wrestling event on June 24, 2019, and the other time also with Takeshita and Yuki Ino at DDT Live! Maji Manji Super - New Year Special on January 3, 2019, scoring a victory against #StrongHearts (Cima, T-Hawk and Duan Yingnan). He is a multiple time Ironman Heavymetalweight Champion, last time winning it at DDT You Can Get A Lot Of Protein From Peanuts! on September 7, 2019 when he teamed up with Konosuke Takeshita to take on Damnation (Daisuke Sasaki and Puma King) in a tag team match in which he pinned the latter to win the contest and the title.

== Championships and accomplishments ==
- DDT Pro-Wrestling

- DDT Extreme Championship (5 times)
- Greater China Unified Zhongyuan Tag Team Championship (1 time) – with Choun Shiryu
- Ironman Heavymetalweight Championship (8 times)
- KO-D 6-Man Tag Team Championship (5 times) – with Konosuke Takeshita and Diego (1), Konosuke Takeshita and Shunma Katsumata (1), Konosuke Takeshita and Yuki Iino (1), Kazuki Hirata and Shota (1) and Harashima and Yasu Urano (1)
- KO-D 8-Man Tag Team Championship (1 time) – with Yoshiaki Yatsu, Hiroshi Yamato and Keigo Nakamura

- Pro Wrestling Illustrated

- Ranked No. 264 of the top 500 singles wrestlers in the PWI 500 in 2015
