= List of current champions in CyberFight =

CyberFight is a professional wrestling promotion based in Shinjuku, Tokyo. The company promotes several championships and title reigns are either determined by professional wrestling matches or are awarded to a wrestler, as a result of the culmination of various scripted storylines.

CyberFight was founded as an umbrella promotion for three promotions which are regarded as brands, in a similar manner to the WWE brand extension. The three promotions are DDT Pro-Wrestling (DDT), Pro Wrestling Noah (Noah) and Tokyo Joshi Pro-Wrestling (TJPW).

There are currently 20 championships in CyberFight. DDT features six active singles championships, one active tag team championship, one active six-man tag team championship and one active ten-man tag team championship. Four of those titles carry the letters "KO-D", standing for "King of DDT", and are regarded as the promotion's primary titles. Noah features six active singles championships and two active tag team championships, all of which carry the letters "GHC", after Noah's governing body, Global Honored Crown. TJPW is a women's professional wrestling promotion that features two active singles championships and one active tag team championship.

As of November 11, 2026, among the three current brands, 25 wrestlers officially hold championships. This list includes the number of times the wrestler has held the title, the date and location of the win, and a description of the winning bout.

== Current champions ==
=== DDT ===
==== Singles ====
Championship	Current champion(s)	Reign	Date won	Days held	Successful defenses	Location	Notes	Ref.
KO-D Openweight Championship	Mao	1	August 11, 2026	92	0	Tokyo, Japan	Defeated Yuki Ueno at Wrestle Peter Pan.	
DDT Universal Championship	Ryusuke Taguchi	1	August 11, 2026	92	0	Tokyo, Japan	Defeated Kazuma Sumi at Wrestle Peter Pan.	
DDT Extreme Championship	Shunma Katsumata	4	August 11, 2026	92	0	Tokyo, Japan	Defeated Hideki Okatani in a Barbed wire Deathmatch at Wrestle Peter Pan.	
O-40 Championship	Daisuke Sasaki	1	November 22, 2025	354	0	Tokyo, Japan	Defeated Antonio Honda at Shout Your Love in the Ring of Hama.	
World Ōmori Championship	Masahiro Takanashi	1	November 10, 2024	731	0	Tokyo, Japan	Defeated Soma Takao at Utan Festival.	
Ironman Heavymetalweight Championship	Yoshihiko	15	November 3, 2026	8	—	Tokyo, Japan	Pinned Mansoor at Ultimate Party.	

==== Tag teams ====
Championship	Current champion(s)	Reign	Date won	Days held	Successful defenses	Location	Notes	Ref.
KO-D Tag Team Championship	paleyouth (Takeshi Masada and Yuya Koroku)	1 (2, 1)	September 27, 2026	45	0	Tokyo, Japan	Defeated Shinya Aoki and Junta Miyawaki at Final Face 2026 Goodbye To Shinjuku FACE!.	
KO-D 6-Man Tag Team Championship	Damnation T.A (Daisuke Sasaki, Hideki Okatani and Ilusion)	2 (9, 3, 2)	September 21, 2026	51+	0	Tokyo, Japan	Defeated Strange Love Connection (Kanon, Viento Levante, and Yukio Naya) at Dramatic Infinity 2026.	
KO-D 10-Man Tag Team Championship	Damnation T.A. (Daisuke Sasaki, Demus, Hideki Okatani, MJ Paul and Ilusion)	1	December 28, 2025	318	0	Nagoya, Japan	Defeated To-y, Yuya Koroku, Yuki Ishida, Kazuma Sumi and Daichi Sato (who replaced Keigo Nakamura) at Year-End Dramatic Parade 2025.	

=== Noah ===
==== Singles ====
Championship	Current champion(s)	Reign	Date won	Days held	Successful defenses	Location	Notes	Ref.
GHC Heavyweight Championship	Tetsuya Naito	1	August 9, 2026	94	1	Tokyo, Japan	Defeated Shane Haste at Legacy Rise: Night 3	
GHC National Championship	Luis Mante	1	October 25, 2026	17	0	Tokyo, Japan	Defeated Naomichi Marufuji at Wrestle Odyssey.	
GHC Junior Heavyweight Championship	Kai Fujimura	1	August 10, 2026	93	1	Tokyo, Japan	Defeated Eita at Legacy Rise: Night 4	
GHC Hardcore Championship	Shuji Ishikawa	2	June 15, 2026	149	0	Tokyo, Japan	Defeated Daisuke Sekimoto at Wrestle Magic 2026 to win the vacant title after champion Hikaru Sato had to vacate due to injury.	
GHC 200 Championship	Shuji Kondo	1	October 25, 2026	17	0	Tokyo, Japan	Defeated Hayata at Wrestle Odyssey.	

==== Tag teams ====
Championship	Current champion(s)	Reign	Date won	Days held	Successful defenses	Location	Notes	Ref.
GHC Tag Team Championship	Jōnetsu MAX (Manabu Soya and Yuki Iino)	1 (2, 1)	June 25, 2026	139	1	Nagoya, Japan	Defeated Los Tranquilos de Japon at Legacy Rise 2026.	
GHC Junior Heavyweight Tag Team Championship	Team 2000X (Jun Masaoka and Yo-Hey)	1 (1, 8)	October 4, 2026	38	0	Yokohama, Japan	Defeated Alejandro and Dragon Bane at N-1 Victory (Finals).	

==== Women's ====
Championship	Current champion(s)	Reign	Date won	Days held	Successful defenses	Location	Notes	Ref.
GHC Women's Championship	Mirai	1	June 15, 2026	149	1	Tokyo, Japan	Defeated Great Sakuya to win the vacant championship.	

=== TJPW ===
Championship	Current champion(s)	Reign	Date won	Days held	Successful defenses	Location	Notes	Ref.
Princess of Princess Championship	Shoko Nakajima	3	November 8, 2026	3	0	Tokyo, Japan	Defeated Yuki Arai at All Rise.	
International Princess Championship	Suzume	2	March 29, 2026	227	5	Tokyo, Japan	Defeated Mirai at Grand Princess.	
Princess Tag Team Championship	Shunrai Rekka!! Prism Greed (Yuki Aino and Haru Kazashiro)	1 (3,1)	October 2, 2026	40	1	Tokyo, Japan	Defeated Hakuchuumu (Miu Watanabe and Rika Tatsumi) at Wrestle Princess VII.	
Unlimited Princess Championship	Vacant	N/A	N/A	N/A	N/A	Tokyo, Japan	First champion to be determined by a battle royal on December 26, 2026.	

== See also ==
Champions in CyberFight lists

- List of Ironman Heavymetalweight Champions

Personnel of CyberFight lists

- List of DDT Pro-Wrestling personnel
- List of Pro Wrestling Noah personnel
