= Dramatic Infinity 2026 =

2026 DDT Pro-Wrestling event

- Promotional poster featuring Mao and Fuminori Abe
- Promotion: CyberFight
- Brand: DDT
- Date: September 21, 2026
- City: Tokyo, Japan
- Venue: Korakuen Hall

Pay-per-view chronology
← Previous; Wrestle Peter Pan	Next → —

Dramatic Infinity chronology
← Previous; 2025	Next → —

Dramatic Infinity 2026 (Japanese: DRAMATIC INFINITY 2026～プロレスの秋～, Hepburn: Dramatic Infinity 2026: Puroresu no Aki) was a professional wrestling event promoted by CyberFight's sub-brand DDT Pro-Wrestling (DDT). It took place on September 21, 2026, in Tokyo, Japan, at the Korakuen Hall. The event aired on CyberFight's streaming service Wrestle Universe.

== Background ==
The event featured professional wrestling matches that resulted from scripted storylines, where wrestlers portrayed villains, heroes, or less distinguishable characters in the scripted events that built tension and culminated in a wrestling match or series of matches.

=== Event ===
The event started with the tag team confrontation between Tomomitsu Matsunaga and Yuni, and Kazuma Sumi and Naomi Yoshimura, solded with the victory of the latters. Next up, Daichi Satoh, Takeshi Masada and Yuya Koroku picked up a victory over Shunma Katsumata, To-y and Yuki Ueno in six-man tag team competition. The third bout saw Soma Takao outmatch Kazuki Hirata in singles competition. Next up, Junta Miyawaki and Shinya Aoki defeated the team of Chris Brookes and Hinata Kasai, and the team of Yuki Ishida in three-way tag team competition. In the fifth match, Jun Akiyama and Yuji Nagata defeated Danshoku Dino and Harashima in tag team competition. At the time of the bout, Dino was the Ironman Heavymetalweight champion, but lost the title due to taking the pinfall from Akiyama, rendering the latter as the new champion. Shortly after the bout concluded, Nagata quickly pinned Akiyama in the ring to take the title. The seventh bout saw Daisuke Sasaki, Hideki Okatani and Ilusion defeat Kanon, Viento Levante and Yukio Naya to win the KO-D 6-Man Tag Team Championship, ending the latter team's reign at 41 days and one defense. Next up, Ryusuke Taguchi defeated Antonio Honda in singles competition to secure the second consecutive defense of the DDT Universal Championship in that respective reign.

The ninth bout saw Mao defeat Fuminori Abe to secure the third consecutive defense of the KO-D Openweight Championship in that respective reign. The bout was scheduled to be the main event. However, right after it concluded, Sanshiro Takagi, who wanted to cash his "Right To Challenge Anytime, Anywhere Contract" on the retaining Mao, was immediately challenged by Ilusion to a bout disputed for Takagi's contract, which the latter lost. This led to Ilusion also unsuccessfully challenging Mao for the Openweight title, thus making the latter retain once more that night and secure the fourth consecutive defense in that reign. Mao requested Chris Brookes as his next challenger after the final bout.

== Results ==
No.	Results	Stipulations	Times
1^{D}	Naomi Yoshimura and Kazuma Sumi defeated Tomomitsu Matsunaga and Yuni by pinfall	Tag team match	9:25
2	paleyouth (Takeshi Masada, Yuya Koroku and Daichi Sato) defeated The37Kamiina (Yuki Ueno, Shunma Katsumata, and To-y) by pinfall	Six-man tag team match	10:30
3	Soma Takao defeated Kazuki Hirata by pinfall	Singles match	8:27
4	Junta Miyawaki and Shinya Aoki defeated Fantômes Dramatic (Chris Brookes and Hinata Kasai), and Yuki Ishida and Masami Inahata by pinfall	Three-way tag team match	7:28
5	Jun Akiyama and Yuji Nagata defeated Harashima and Danshoku Dino (c) by pinfall (Note: Since Akiyama pinned Harashima, he became the Iroman Heavymetalweight Champion.)	Tag team match for the Ironman Heavymetalweight Championship	9:59
6	Yuji Nagata defeated Jun Akiyama (c) by pinfall	Singles match for the Ironman Heavymetalweight Championship	12:03
7	Damnation T.A (Daisuke Sasaki, Hideki Okatani, and Ilusion) defeated Strange Love Connection (Kanon, Yukio Naya, and Viento Levante) (c) (with Kimihiro and Yuzuki) by pinfall	Six-man tag team match for the KO-D 6-Man Tag Team Championship (Note: Since Ilusion pinned Viento, Ilusion automatically claimed Viento's Right to Challenge Anywhere Anytime contract.)	12:40
8	Ryusuke Taguchi (c) defeated Antonio Honda by pinfall	Singles match for the DDT Universal Championship	12:49
9	Mao (c) defeated Fuminori Abe by pinfall	Singles match for the KO-D Openweight Championship	19:14
10	Ilusion defeated Sanshiro Takagi by pinfall	Singles match This was for Takagi's Right To Challenge Anytime Anywhere contract.	1:12
11	Mao (c) defeated Ilusion by pinfall	Singles match for the KO-D Openweight Championship; This was Ilusion's Right to Challenge Anywhere Anytime contract cash-in match.	4:35
(c) / – the champion(s) heading into the match; D / – this was a dark match
