= Wrestle Peter Pan 2026 =

2026 DDT Pro-Wrestling event

- Promotional poster of the event featuring Yuki Ueno and Mao
- Promotion: CyberFight
- Brand: DDT
- Date: August 11, 2026
- City: Tokyo, Japan
- Venue: Ryogoku Kokugikan

Pay-per-view chronology
← Previous; Judgement	Next → Dramatic Infinity

Peter Pan chronology
← Previous; 2025	Next → —

Wrestle Peter Pan 2026 was a professional wrestling event promoted by CyberFight's sub-brand DDT Pro-Wrestling (DDT). It took place on August 11, 2026, in Tokyo, Japan, at the Ryogoku Kokugikan. The event aired on CyberFight's streaming service Wrestle Universe. The event also featured wrestlers from New Japan Pro Wrestling (NJPW).

== Production ==
=== Background ===
Since 2009, DDT began annually producing shows in the Ryōgoku Kokugikan held in the summer, following the promotions financial success of the first event. This led to the event becoming DDT's premier annual event and one of the biggest event on the independent circuit of Japanese wrestling. Since 2019, the event was renamed "Wrestle Peter Pan".

=== Storylines ===
The event featured professional wrestling matches that resulted from scripted storylines, where wrestlers portrayed villains, heroes, or less distinguishable characters in the scripted events that built tension and culminated in a wrestling match or series of matches.

=== Event ===
The event started with the six-man tag team confrontation in which Kanon, Yukio Naya, and Viento Levante defeated Takeshi Masada, Yuya Koroku, and Daichi Satoh to win the KO-D 6-Man Tag Team Championship, ending the latter team's reign at 153 days and six defenses. Next up, Ilusion won a battle royal contested for the Ironman Heavymetalweight Championship by last eliminating Yoshihiko. Right after its ending, the bout led to the title changing hands five more times in spinoff pinfalls occurring in the ring.

Next up, Minoru Suzuki and Sanshiro Takagi picked up a victory over Kazuki Hirata and To-y in tag team competition. By pinning To-y, Takagi won the latter's Right To Challenge Anytime, Anywhere Contract, which he would use later during the event. The ninth bout saw Jun Akiyama and Rukiya defeat Jun Kasai and Hinata Kasai in tag team competition. Next up, Shunma Katsumata defeated Hideki Okatani to win the DDT Extreme Championship, ending the latter's reign at 142 days and four defenses. In the eleventh match, Shinya Aoki and Junta Miyawaki defeated Chris Brookes and Harashima to win the KO-D Tag Team Championship, ending the latter team's reign at 128 days and three defenses. Next up, Yamato picked up a victory over Danshoku Dino in singles competition. The thirteenth bout saw Daisuke Sasaki and Douki defeat Antonio Honda and Tetsuya Endo in tag team competition. In the fourteenth bout, Ryusuke Taguchi defeated Kazuma Sumi to win the DDT Universal Championship, ending the latter's reign at 142 days and two defenses. In the semi main event, Konosuke Takeshita defeated Kaisei Takechi in singles competition.

In the main event, Mao defeated Yuki Ueno to win the KO-D Openweight Championship, ending the latter's reign at 317 days and seven defenses. After the bout concluded, Mao was challenged by Sanshiro Takagi who won a right to challenge contract earlier that night, however, the latter came out unsuccessful as Mao secured his first defense of the title in that respective reign.

== Results ==
No.	Results	Stipulations	Times
1	Strange Love Connection (Kanon, Yukio Naya, and Viento Levante) defeated paleyouth (Takeshi Masada, Yuya Koroku, and Daichi Sato) (c) by pinfall	Six-man tag team match for the KO-D 6-Man Tag Team Championship	11:55
2	Super Sasadango Machine defeated Ilusion (c) by pinfall	Singles match for the Ironman Heavymetalweight Championship	—
3	Yuki Ishida defeated Super Sasadango Machine (c) by pinfall	Singles match for the Ironman Heavymetalweight Championship	—
4	Yuni defeated Yuki Ishida (c) by pinfall	Singles match for the Ironman Heavymetalweight Championship	—
5	Kazuki Hirata defeated Yuni (c) by pinfall	Singles match for the Ironman Heavymetalweight Championship	—
6	Akito defeated Kazuki Hirata (c) by pinfall	Singles match for the Ironman Heavymetalweight Championship	—
7	Ilusion won by last eliminating Yoshihiko (Note: The other participants in the match were Akito, Fuminori Abe, Masami Inahata, MJ Paul, Naomi Yoshimura, Soma Takao, Super Sasadango Machine, Toru Owashi, Yuki Iino, Yuki Ishida and Yuni. Masami Inahata and Yoshihiko both won the title during the course of the match.)	Battle royal for the Ironman Heavymetalweight Championship	18:57
8	Kazuki Hirata defeated Ilusion (c) by pinfall	Singles match for the Ironman Heavymetalweight Championship	—
9	Minoru Suzuki and Sanshiro Takagi defeated Kazuki Hirata and To-y by pinfall	Tag team match	10:36
10	Jun Akiyama and Rukiya defeated Jun Kasai and Hinata Kasai by pinfall	Tag team match	11:19
11	Shunma Katsumata defeated Hideki Okatani (c) by pinfall	Barbed wire Deathmatch for the DDT Extreme Championship	13:52
12	Shinya Aoki and Junta Miyawaki defeated Fantômes Dramatic (Chris Brookes and Harashima) (c) by pinfall	Tag team match for the KO-D Tag Team Championship	12:21
13	Yamato defeated Danshoku Dino (with Yosuke Santa Maria) by pinfall	Singles match	12:07
14	Daisuke Sasaki and Douki defeated Antonio Honda and Tetsuya Endo by submission	Tag team match	16:00
15	Ryusuke Taguchi defeated Kazuma Sumi (c) by pinfall	Singles match for the DDT Universal Championship	18:02
16	Konosuke Takeshita defeated Kaisei Takechi by pinfall	Singles match	17:26
17	Mao defeated Yuki Ueno (c) by pinfall	Singles match for the KO-D Openweight Championship	33:47
18	Mao (c) defeated Sanshiro Takagi by pinfall	Singles match for the KO-D Openweight Championship; This was Takagi's Right To Challenge Anytime, Anywhere Contract cash-in match	6:29
(c) / – the champion(s) heading into the match
