= Ichi ka Bachi ka =

- Promotions: DDT Pro-Wrestling (1999); CyberFight (2026)
- Brands: DDT Pro-Wrestling (2026)
- First event: Ichi ka Bachi ka

Ichi ka Bachi ka (イチかバチか; "Sink or Swim") is a recurring professional wrestling event promoted by CyberFight for the DDT Pro-Wrestling brand (DDT). The event airs as an internet pay-per-view (iPPV) on CyberFight's streaming service Wrestle Universe.

== History ==
In 1999, Ichi ka Bachi ka was the first event produced at the Korakuen Hall by Dramatic Dream Team, an independent promotion founded in 1997 by Shintaro Muto and Pro Wrestling Crusaders alumni Kyohei Mikami, Kazushige Nosawa and Sanshiro Takagi. In 2020, DDT and its subsidiaries merged with Pro Wrestling Noah into a new company called CyberFight owned by the digital advertising company CyberAgent, with DDT and Noah persisting as separate brands under the CyberFight umbrella. In 2026, Ichi ka Bachi ka was brought back for a second edition held in March at Shinjuku Face.

== Events ==
Event	Date	City	Venue	Main event	Ref.
Ichi ka Bachi ka	December 22, 1999	Tokyo, Japan	Korakuen Hall	Sanshiro Takagi vs. Masao Orihara	
Ichi ka Bachi ka 2026	March 11, 2026	Tokyo, Japan	Shinjuku Face	The37Kamiina (Yuki Ueno and To-y) and Kaisei Takechi (c) vs. Paleyouth (Takeshi Masada, Yuya Koroku and Daichi Satoh) for the KO-D 6-Man Tag Team Championship	
(c) – refers to the champion(s) heading into the match

== Results ==
=== 1999 ===
Ichi ka Bachi ka
- Promotion: Dramatic Dream Team
- Date: December 22, 1999
- City: Tokyo, Japan
- Venue: Korakuen Hall
- Attendance: 2,000

Ichi ka Bachi ka chronology
← Previous —	Next → 2026

No.	Results	Stipulations	Times
1	Yusaku and Daisaku defeated Super Uchuu Power and Kengo Takai	Tag team match	8:00
2	Poison Sawada Black and Naoshi Sano defeated Mitsunobu Kikuzawa, Shigeo Kato and Misae-chan	Street fight deathmatch three-on-two handicap match	10:02
3	Kamen Shooter Super Rider, Thanomsak Toba and Neo Winger defeated Exciting Yoshida, Phantom Funakoshi and Yuki Nishino	Six-man tag team match	18:22
4	Takashi Sasaki defeated Kyohei Mikami	Singles match	16:46
5	Ryuma Go, Masashi Aoyagi and Mitsuya Nagai defeated Koichiro Kimura, Masahiko Orihara and Kendo Nagasaki	Six-man tag team match	15:35
6	Sanshiro Takagi defeated Masao Orihara	Singles match	15:50

=== 2026 ===
Ichi ka Bachi ka 2026
- Promotion: Dramatic Dream Team
- Date: March 11, 2026
- City: Tokyo, Japan
- Venue: Shinjuku Face

Ichi ka Bachi ka chronology
← Previous; 1999	Next → —

No.	Results	Stipulations	Times
1^{P}	Rika Tatsumi and Uta Takami defeated Yuki Kamifuku and Kira Summer	Tag team match	10:17
2	Shinya Aoki, Junta Miyawaki and Viento Maligno defeated Fantômes Dramatic (Chris Brookes and Hinata Kasai) and Kota Sekifuda	Six-man tag team match	10:05
3	Fantômes Dramatic (Harashima and Antonio Honda) defeated Jun Akiyama and Kazuki Hirata	Tag team match	7:34
4	Kazuma Sumi and Harimau (Naomi Yoshimura, Ryota Nakatsu and Yuki Ishida) defeated Damnation T.A. (Daisuke Sasaki, Hideki Okatani, MJ Paul and Ilusion)	Eight-man tag team match	10:12
5	Shishamo Power, Unagi Mask and Gota Ihashi defeated The Apex (Yuki Iino and Yukio Naya) and Tomomitsu Matsunaga	Six-man tag team match	9:33
6	Strange Love Connection (Mao and Kanon) (c) (with Kimihiro) defeated Danshoku Dino and Super Sasadango Machine	Tag team match for the KO-D Tag Team Championship	18:47
7	Paleyouth (Takeshi Masada, Yuya Koroku and Daichi Satoh) defeated The37Kamiina (Yuki Ueno and To-y) and Kaisei Takechi (c)	Six-man tag team match for the KO-D 6-Man Tag Team Championship	18:25
(c) / – the champion(s) heading into the match; P / – the match was broadcast on the pre-show
