= Wrestle Peter Pan 2025 =

2025 DDT Pro-Wrestling event

- Left: Promotional poster for day one Right: Promotional poster for day two
- Promotion: CyberFight
- Brand: DDT
- Date: August 30–31, 2025
- City: Tokyo, Japan
- Venue: Tokyo Higashin Arena (Day 1); Korakuen Hall (Day 2)

Pay-per-view chronology
← Previous; King of Kings	Next → Dramatic Infinity

Peter Pan chronology
← Previous; 2024	Next → 2026

Wrestle Peter Pan 2025 was a two-night professional wrestling event promoted by CyberFight's sub-brand DDT Pro-Wrestling (DDT). It took place on August 30 and 31, 2025, in Tokyo, Japan, at the Korakuen Hall and Tokyo Higashin Arena. The event aired on CyberFight's streaming service Wrestle Universe.

It was first Peter Pan event to be held on two separate days (not counting the 2020 edition held without an audience during the COVID-19 pandemic) and also featured wrestlers from New Japan Pro Wrestling (NJPW).

== Production ==
=== Background ===
Since 2009, DDT began annually producing shows in the Ryōgoku Kokugikan held in the summer, following the promotions financial success of the first event. This led to the event becoming DDT's premier annual event and one of the biggest event on the independent circuit of Japanese wrestling. Since 2019, the event was renamed "Wrestle Peter Pan".

=== Storylines ===
The event featured professional wrestling matches that resulted from scripted storylines, where wrestlers portrayed villains, heroes, or less distinguishable characters in the scripted events that built tension and culminated in a wrestling match or series of matches.

== Results ==
=== Night 1 ===
The first night of the event from August 30 started with the tag team confrontation between Soma Takao and Rukiya, and Shinichiro Kawamatsu and Yuki Ishida, solded with the victort of the latters. Next up, Danshoku Dino picked up a victory over Kazuki Hirata and Antonio Honda in three-way competition. The third bout saw Ilusion, MJ Paul and Haruto Sakuraba outmatch Akito, Naomi Yoshimura and Daichi Sato in six-man tag team competition. Next up, Mao, Kanon and Kumadori defeated Yuki Ueno, Shinya Aoki and Kazuma Sumi in another six-man tag team bout. In the sixth match, To-y defeated Yuya Koroku to secure the second consecutive defense of the DDT Extreme Championship in that respective reign. Next up, Minoru Suzuki defeated Muscle Sakai in singles competition. In the eighth bout, Zack Sabre Jr. and Kosei Fujita defeated Chris Brookes and Takeshi Masada in tag team competition. In the semi main event, Yuki Iino and Yukio Naya defeated Daisuke Sasaki and Hideki Okatani to secure the second consecutive defense of the KO-D Tag Team Championship in that respective reign.

In the main event, Kazusada Higuchi defeated Jun Akiyama to secure the second consecutive defense of the KO-D Openweight Championship in that respective reign.

Day 1 (August 30)
No.	Results	Stipulations	Times
1	Harashima defeated Hinata Kasai by pinfall	Singles match	10:24
2	Shinichiro Kawamatsu and Yuki Ishida defeated Soma Takao and Rukiya by pinfall	Tag team match	6:32
3	Danshoku Dino defeated Kazuki Hirata and Antonio Honda by pinfall	Three-way match	9:19
4	Damnation T.A. (Ilusion, MJ Paul and Haruto Sakuraba) defeated Akito, Naomi Yoshimura and Daichi Sato by pinfall	Six-man tag team match	12:21
5	Strange Love Connection (Mao and Kanon) and Kumadori (with Kimihiro) defeated Yuki Ueno, Shinya Aoki and Kazuma Sumi by pinfall	Six-man tag team match	12:11
6	To-y (c) defeated Yuya Koroku	Pro-Wrestling Life or Deathmatch for the DDT Extreme Championship	9:20
7	Minoru Suzuki defeated Muscle Sakai by pinfall	Singles match	7:42
8	TMDK (Zack Sabre Jr. and Kosei Fujita) defeated Schadenfreude International (Chris Brookes and Takeshi Masada) by submission	Tag team match	19:49
9	The Apex (Yuki Iino and Yukio Naya) (c) defeated Damnation T.A. (Daisuke Sasaki and Hideki Okatani) by pinfall	Tag team match for the KO-D Tag Team Championship	16:01
10	Kazusada Higuchi (c) defeated Jun Akiyama by pinfall	Singles match for the KO-D Openweight Championship	17:41
(c) / – the champion(s) heading into the match

=== Night 2 ===
The second night of the event from August 31 started with the eight-man tag team confrontation in which Ilusion, Yuya Koroku, Munetatsu Nakamura and Kazuma Sumi defeated To-y, Daichi Sato, Rukiya and Hinata Kasai. Next up, Jun Akiyama, Super Sasadango Machine and Akito defeated Kanon, Kazuki Hirata and Antonio Honda in six-man tag team competition. The third bout saw Chris Brookes and Takeshi Masada outmatch Hideki Okatani and MJ Paul, and Naomi Yoshimura and Yuki Ishida in three-way tag team competition. Next up, Yuki Iino and Yukio Naya defeated Harashima and Shinya Aoki to secure the third consecutive defense of the KO-D Tag Team Championship in that respective reign. In the fifth match, Minoru Suzuki defeated Mao to secure the fourth consecutive defense of the DDT Universal Championship in that respective reign. Next up, Hiroshi Tanahashi defeated Danshoku Dino in singles competition, in Tanahashi's last performance in DDT Pro-Wrestling before his retirement.

The evening has had a double main event. The originally scheduled bout between Kazusada Higuchi and Yuki Ueno solded with Ueno defeating Higuchi to win the KO-D Openweight Championship, ending the latter's reign at 63 days and two defenses. Kazuki Hirata then cashed in his "Right to Challenge Anytime Anywhere contract" and successfully challenged Ueno to win the Openweight title.

Day 2 (August 31)
No.	Results	Stipulations	Times
1	Ilusion, Yuya Koroku, Munetatsu Nakamura and Kazuma Sumi defeated To-y, Daichi Sato, Rukiya and Hinata Kasai by submission	Eight-man tag team match Koroku also won Sato's Right to Challenge Anytime Anywhere contract	6:36
2	Jun Akiyama, Super Sasadango Machine and Akito defeated Kanon, Kazuki Hirata and Antonio Honda (with Kimihiro) by pinfall	Six-man tag team match	9:17
3	Schadenfreude International (Chris Brookes and Takeshi Masada) defeated Damnation T.A. (Hideki Okatani and MJ Paul) and Harimau (Naomi Yoshimura and Yuki Ishida) by pinfall	Three-way tag team match	6:15
4	The Apex (Yuki Iino and Yukio Naya) (c) defeated Harashima and Shinya Aoki by pinfall	Tag team match for the KO-D Tag Team Championship	11:37
5	Minoru Suzuki (c) defeated Mao by pinfall	Singles match for the DDT Universal Championship	17:50
6	Hiroshi Tanahashi defeated Danshoku Dino by pinfall	Singles match	16:29
7	Yuki Ueno defeated Kazusada Higuchi (c) by pinfall	Singles match for the KO-D Openweight Championship	20:42
8	Kazuki Hirata defeated Yuki Ueno (c) by pinfall	Singles match for the KO-D Openweight Championship; This was Hirata's Right to Challenge Anytime Anywhere cash-in match	2:51
(c) / – the champion(s) heading into the match
