= Wrestle Peter Pan 2024 =

2024 DDT Pro-Wrestling event

- Promotional poster featuring Yuki Ueno and Mao
- Promotion: CyberFight
- Brand: DDT
- Date: July 21, 2024
- City: Tokyo, Japan
- Venue: Ryōgoku Kokugikan
- Attendance: 4,131

Pay-per-view chronology
← Previous; Judgement 2024	Next → Dramatic Infinity 2024

Peter Pan chronology
← Previous; 2023	Next → 2025

Wrestle Peter Pan 2024 was a professional wrestling event promoted by CyberFight's sub-brand DDT Pro-Wrestling (DDT). It took place on July 21, 2024, in Tokyo, Japan, at the Ryōgoku Kokugikan. The event aired on CyberFight's streaming service Wrestle Universe.

== Production ==
=== Background ===
Since 2009, DDT began annually producing shows in the Ryōgoku Kokugikan held in the summer, following the promotions financial success of the first event. This led to the event becoming DDT's premier annual event and one of the biggest event on the independent circuit of Japanese wrestling. Since 2019, the event was renamed "Wrestle Peter Pan".

=== Storylines ===
The event featured professional wrestling matches that resulted from scripted storylines, where wrestlers portrayed villains, heroes, or less distinguishable characters in the scripted events that built tension and culminated in a wrestling match or series of matches.

=== Event ===
The event started with two preshow bouts broadcast live on DDT's YouTube channel. In the first one, Keigo Nakamura, Yuki Ishida and Kazuma Sumi picked up a victory over Yuni, Yuya Koroku and Ilusion in six-man tag team competition, and in the second one, Toru Owashi, Hisamaru Tajima and Shinichiro Kawamatsu outmatched Makoto Oishi, Soma Takao and Ippanjin Munenori Sawa in the same type of bout.

The first main card bout saw Kazuki Hirata defeating Super Sasadango Machine in singles competition. Next up, Jun Akiyama, Yukio Naya and Tomomitsu Matsunaga defeated Minoru Suzuki, Shuji Ishikawa and Hikaru Sato in six-man tag team competition. In the fifth bout of the night, Danshoku Dino defeated Sanshiro Takagi in a Weapon rumble match to retain the Ironman Heavymetalweight Championship. During the match, Kota Ibushi returned to DDT as one of Dino's "special weapons". Next up, Damnation T.A (Daisuke Sasaki, MJ Paul and Kanon) defeated reigning champions Smile Squash (Akito, Harashima and Yasu Urano) in a four way tag team match also involving the teams of Aja Kong and The37Kamiina (Shunma Katsumata and To-y), and Schadenfreude International (Antonio Honda, Masahiro Takanashi and Takeshi Masada) to win the KO-D 6-Man Tag Team Championship, ending Smile Squash's reign at 46 days and no successful defenses. In the eighth bout, All Elite Wrestling's Konosuke Takeshita made a return to DDT by defeating Pro Wrestling Zero1's Masato Tanaka in singles competition. In the eighth bout, Tetsuya Endo and Yuki Iino defeated Pro Wrestling Noah's Go Shiozaki and Atsushi Kotoge to secure the third consecutive defense of the KO-D Tag Team Championship in that resepective reign. In the semi main event, New Japan Pro Wrestling's El Desperado picked up a win over Chris Brookes in a special singles confrontation.

In the main event, Yuki Ueno defeated The37Kamiina stablemate, DDT Universal Champion and 2024 King of DDT Tournament winner Mao to secure the sixth consecutive defense of the KO-D Openweight Championship in that respective reign. After the bout concluded, Ueno nominated Shinya Aoki as his next challenger in a bout which was set to take place on August 25, 2024.

== Results ==
No.	Results	Stipulations	Times
1^{P}	Keigo Nakamura, Yuki Ishida and Kazuma Sumi defeated Yuni, Yuya Koroku and Ilusion	Six-man tag team match	7:37
2^{P}	Toru Owashi, Hisamaru Tajima and Shinichiro Kawamatsu defeated Makoto Oishi, Soma Takao and Ippanjin Munenori Sawa	Six-man tag team match	6:28
3	Kazuki Hirata defeated Super Sasadango Machine	Singles match	11:53
4	Jun Akiyama, Yukio Naya and Tomomitsu Matsunaga defeated Minoru Suzuki, Shuji Ishikawa and Hikaru Sato	Six-man tag team match	12:18
5	Danshoku Dino (c) defeated Sanshiro Takagi	Weapon rumble match for the Ironman Heavymetalweight Championship	20:54
6	Damnation T.A (Daisuke Sasaki, MJ Paul and Kanon) defeated Smile Squash (Akito, Harashima and Yasu Urano) (c), Aja Kong and The37Kamiina (Shunma Katsumata and To-y), and Schadenfreude International (Antonio Honda, Masahiro Takanashi and Takeshi Masada)	Elimination four-way tag team match for the KO-D 6-Man Tag Team Championship	17:30
7	Konosuke Takeshita defeated Masato Tanaka	Singles match	14:42
8	Burning (Tetsuya Endo and Yuki Iino) (c) defeated Team Noah (Go Shiozaki and Atsushi Kotoge)	Tag team match for the KO-D Tag Team Championship	20:37
9	El Desperado defeated Chris Brookes	No disqualification match	22:12
10	Yuki Ueno (c) defeated Mao	Singles match for the KO-D Openweight Championship	29:44
(c) / – the champion(s) heading into the match; P / – the match was broadcast on the pre-show
