= Daichi Sato =

Japanese professional wrestler (born 2008)

- Sato in June 2026

Personal information
- Born: 29 August 2008 (age 18) Kawasaki, Japan

Professional wrestling career
- Ring name: Daichi Satoh Daichi Sato
- Billed height: 180 cm (5 ft 11 in)
- Billed weight: 115 kg (254 lb)
- Debut: 2018

Daichi Sato (佐藤大地, Sato Daichi) is a Japanese professional wrestler signed to DDT Pro-Wrestling where he is a former KO-D 6-Man Tag Team Champion. He is also known for his tenure with Pro Wrestling Heat Up and for freelance work with various other promotions from the Japanese independent scene.

== Professional wrestling career ==
=== Japanese independent circuit (2018–present) ===
Sato made his professional wrestling debut at the early age of 10, at Heat Up's Heisei 30 Year City Brand Promotion Project on October 31, 2018, as part of a dojo kids presentation bout in which he teamed up with Itsuki Kawashima, Rainman and Yutoshi Iriguchi to defeat Hiroshi Kondo. He continued to regularly compete for Heat Up between 2021 and 2024 as a developmental talent.

On September 17, 2021, he made his official professional wrestling debut at the Pro Wrestling Heat-Up's Todoroki Arena event while still in his first year of junior high school, by teaming up with Hiroshi Watanabe and Shin Suzuki in a losing effort against Isami Kodaka, Masato Kamino and Takato Nakano.

=== DDT Pro-Wrestling (2021–present) ===
Sato made his debut in DDT Pro-Wrestling at a "DDTeeeen!" specialized youth-focused project event from October 27, 2021, where he fell short to Mao in singles competition. During his time with the promotion, Sato chased for various accomplishments and has been part of the "paleyouth" stable. At DDT Year End Dramatic Parade on December 28, 2025, Sato replaced Keigo Nakamura as he teamed up with To-y, Yuya Koroku, Yuki Ishida and Kazuma Sumi to drop the KO-D 10-Man Tag Team Championship to Damnation T.A. Daisuke Sasaki, Demus, Hideki Okatani, MJ Paul and Ilusion. Sato was not recognized as champion. At Ichi ka Bachi ka on March 11, 2026, he teamed up with Takeshi Masada and Yuya Koroku to defeat The37Kamiina (Yuki Ueno and To-y) and Kaisei Takechi to win the KO-D 6-Man Tag Team Championship. At DDT Last Summer's Standing ~ Summer's Review on August 20, 2026, he unsuccessfully challenged Mao for the KO-D Openweight Championship.

During his time with the promotion, he competed in several signature events. In the D Generations Cup series of events, he made his first appearance at the 2026 edition, finishing with a total of fout points in the A block after competing against Kazuma Sumi, To-y, Yuki Ishida and Ilusion. In the King of DDT Tournament, he made his first appearance at the 2025 edition where he fell short to Yukio Naya in the first rounds. One year later he fell short to Harashima in the first rounds as well.

Sato made his debut in a DDT-promoted pay-per-view at Ultimate Party 2024 where he teamed up with Masahiro Takanashi and Yuki Ishida in a losing effort against Shuji Ishikawa, Tomomitsu Matsunaga and Shinichiro Kawamatsu. On the second night of the Wrestle Peter Pan 2025, Sato teamed up with To-y, Rukiya and Hinata Kasai in a losing effort against Ilusion, Yuya Koroku, Munetatsu Nakamura and Kazuma Sumi. He also lost his "Right to Challenge Anytime Anywhere contract" to Koroku due to taking the pinfall.

== Championships and accomplishments ==
- DDT Pro-Wrestling
  - KO-D 6-Man Tag Team Championship (1 time) – with Takeshi Masada and Yuya Koroku
- Pro Wrestling Heat Up
  - Heat Up Universal Tag Team Championship (2 times) – with Tomoki Hatano
