= KO-D 10-Man Tag Team Championship =

Professional wrestling 10-man tag team championship

- The five belts of the KO-D 10-Man Tag Team Championship

Details
- Promotion: CyberFight
- Brand: DDT Pro-Wrestling
- Date established: April 30, 2017
- Current champions: Damnation T.A. (Daisuke Sasaki, Demus, Hideki Okatani, MJ Paul and Ilusion)
- Date won: December 28, 2025

Other name
- KO-D 8-Man Tag Team Championship (2020–2022)
Statistics
- First champions: Ken Ohka, Ladybeard, LiLiCo, Makoto Oishi and Super Sasadango Machine
- Most reigns: Antonio Honda (3 reigns)
- Longest reign: Ken Ohka, Ladybeard, LiLiCo, Makoto Oishi and Super Sasadango Machine (770 days)
- Shortest reign: Shinya Aoki, Super Sasadango Machine, Antonio Honda and Kazuki Hirata (42 days)
- Oldest champion: Yoshiaki Yatsu (64 years, 350 days)
- Youngest champion: Asuka (21 years, 7 days)
- Heaviest champion: MJ Paul (308 lbs)

The KO-D (King of DDT) 10-Man Tag Team Championship (Japanese: KO-D10人タッグ王座, Hepburn: KO-D Jū-nin Taggu Ōza) is a professional wrestling championship owned by the DDT Pro-Wrestling promotion. Meant for teams of five wrestlers, the title is believed to be the first of its kind in professional wrestling. The title was first announced on April 30, 2017, with the inaugural champions crowned on August 20, 2017.

Like most professional wrestling championships, the title is won as a result of a scripted match. The current title holders are Daisuke Sasaki, Demus, Hideki Okatani, MJ Paul and Ilusion.

== History ==
Recognizing the difficulty of scheduling matches for the title, DDT announced that as long as the captain of the reigning champions and two other members are present, title matches can be held with two replacement members taking the other two spots in the team. These replacement members would, however, not be recognized as official champions.

On December 21, 2020, the title was vacated and became the KO-D 8-Man Tag Team Championship due to the difficulty of scheduling a proper title defense during the COVID-19 pandemic.

On February 14, 2021, at Kawasaki Strong 2021, the team of Shinya Aoki, Super Sasadango Machine, Antonio Honda and Kazuki Hirata won the vacant title. On March 28, at Judgement, they lost the title in their first defense against Team Thoroughbred (Sanshiro Takagi, Yukio Naya, Chikara and Yabe Nakan). On December 28, it was announced that the title would revert to its original 10-man tag team form with the team of Sanshiro Takagi, Akito, Soma Takao, Gota Ihashi and Yuki Ishida challenging in a 5-on-4 handicap match on January 3, 2022.

=== Names ===
Name	Years
KO-D 10-Man Tag Team Championship	April 30, 2017–December 21, 2020; January 3, 2022–present
KO-D 8-Man Tag Team Championship	December 21, 2020–January 3, 2022

=== Belt design ===
A unique aspect of the title is that each belt has a different color strap: red, blue, green, yellow, and pink (temporarily retired for the 8-man version).

== Reigns ==
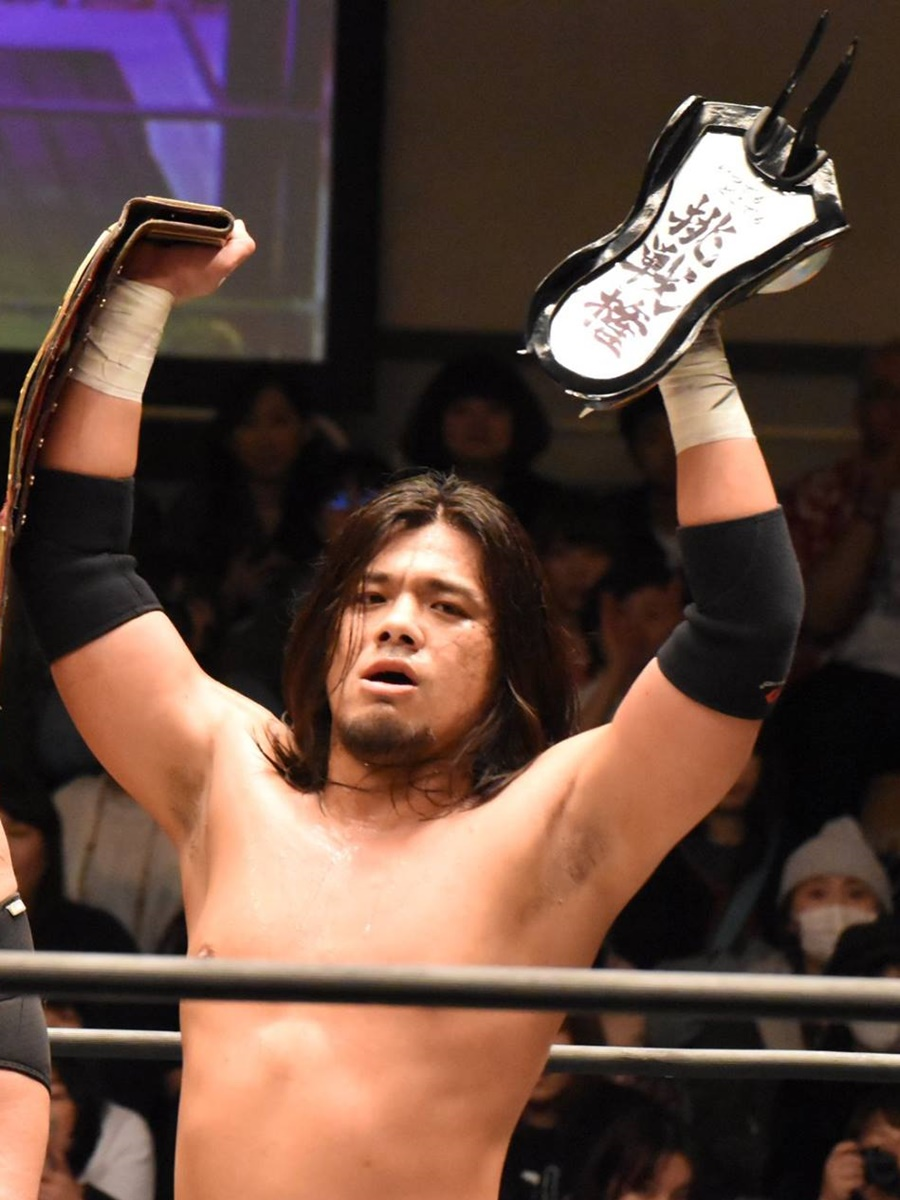
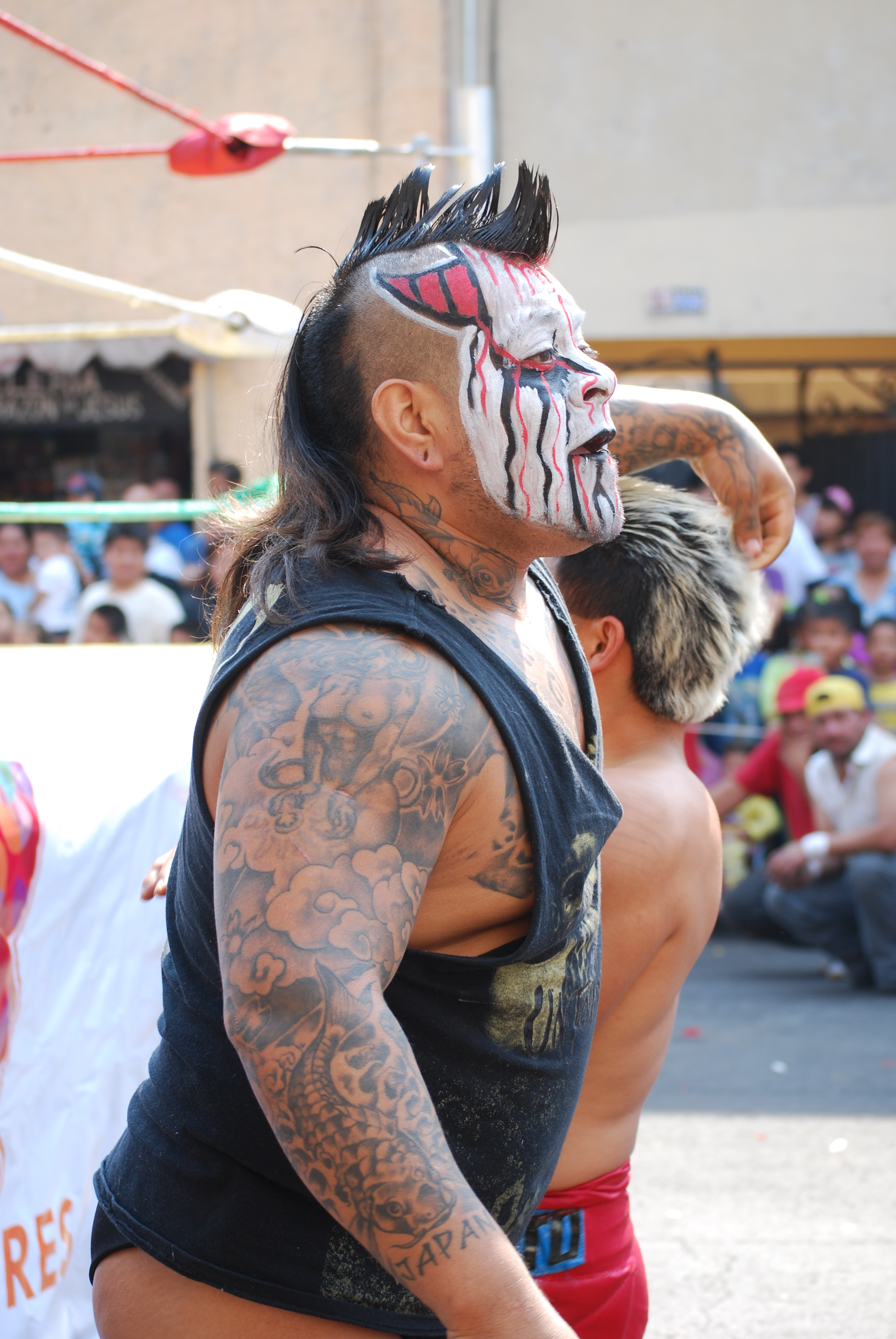
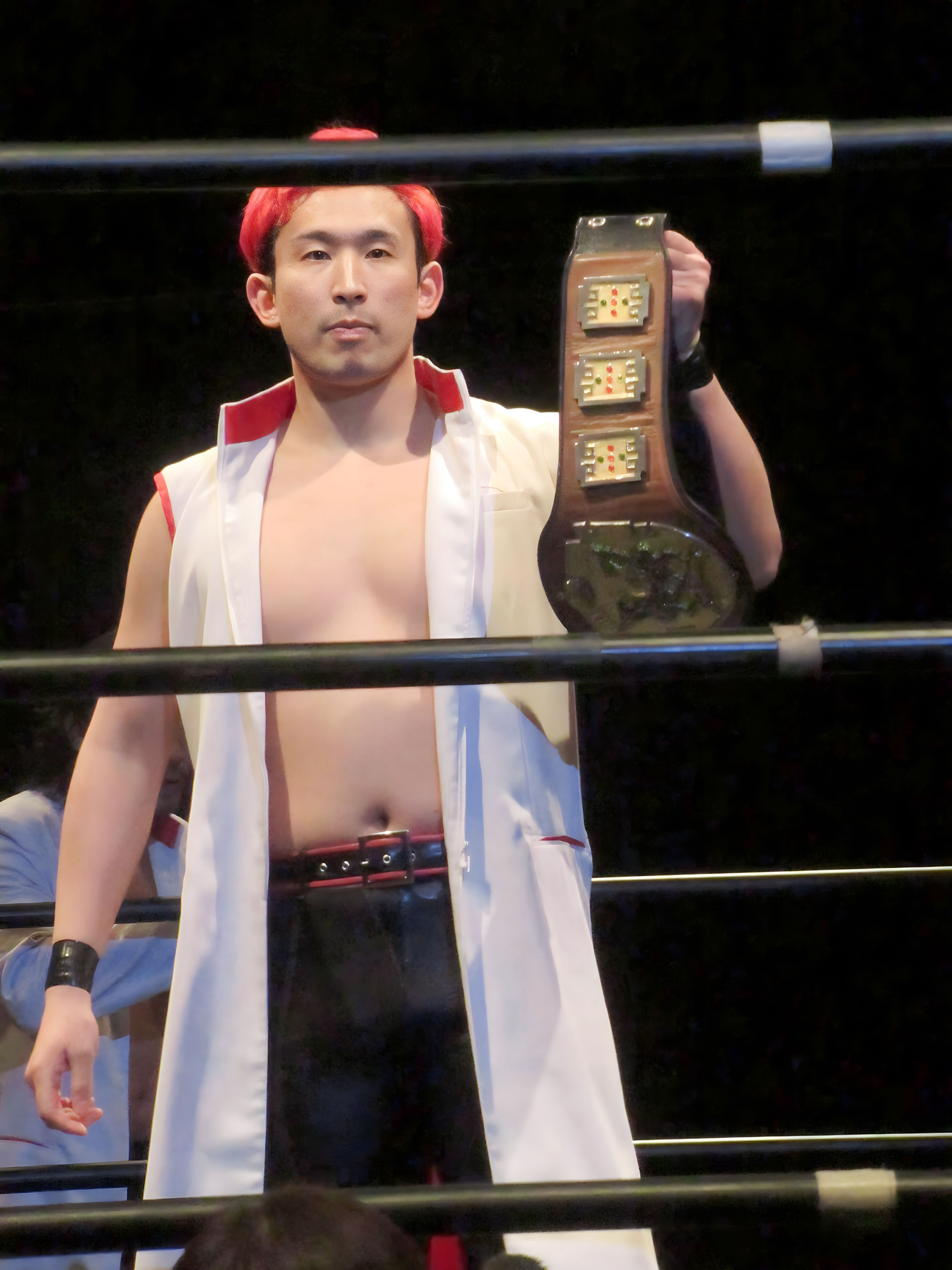
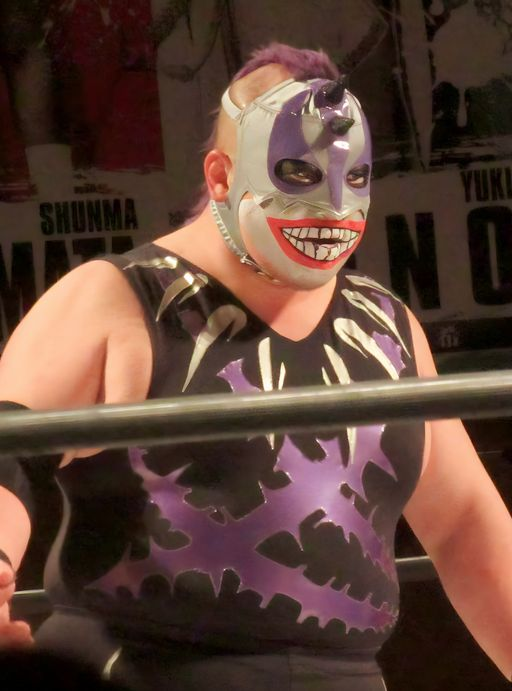
Current champions (from left to right) Daisuke Sasaki, Demus, Hideki Okatani, MJ Paul and Ilusion

As of October 26, 2026, there have been a total of 11 reigns shared between 11 different teams composed of 44 individual champions and two vacancies. Ken Ohka, Ladybeard, LiLiCo, Makoto Oishi and Super Sasadango Machine were the inaugural champions. Their inaugural reign was also the longest at 770 days while Shinya Aoki, Super Sasadango Machine, Antonio Honda and Kazuki Hirata's reign is the shortest at 42 days. Honda is also a record three-time title holder. Yoshiaki Yatsu is the oldest champion, winning the title at 64, while Asuka is the youngest at 21.

The current champions are Daisuke Sasaki, Demus, Hideki Okatani, MJ Paul and Ilusion, who are in their first reign as a team as well as individually. They won the title by defeating Keigo Nakamura, To-y, Yuya Koroku, Yuki Ishida and Kazuma Sumi at DDT Year End Dramatic Parade 2025 on December 28, 2025, in Nagoya, Japan.

Key
No.	Overall reign number
Reign	Reign number for the specific team—reign numbers for the individuals are in parentheses, if different
Days	Number of days held
Defenses	Number of successful defenses
+	Current reign is changing daily

No.	Champion	Championship change			Reign statistics			Notes	Ref.
No.	Champion	Date	Event	Location	Reign	Days	Defenses	Notes	Ref.
DDT Pro-Wrestling (DDT)
1	Ken Ohka, Ladybeard, LiLiCo, Makoto Oishi and Super Sasadango Machine	August 20, 2017	Ryōgoku Peter Pan 2017	Tokyo, Japan	1	770	1	Defeated Joey Ryan, Kazuki Hirata, Saki Akai, Toru Owashi and Yoshihiko to become the inaugural champions.	
—	Vacated	September 29, 2019	—	—	—	—	—	The title was vacated under unknown circumstances.	
2	Danshoku Dino, Asuka, Yuki Iino, Mizuki and Trans-Am★Hiroshi	November 3, 2019	Ultimate Party 2019	Tokyo, Japan	1	414	0	Defeated Super Sasadango Machine, Yuna Manase, Jiro "Ikemen" Kuroshio, Hiroshi Yamato and Makoto Oishi to win the vacant title.	
—	Vacated	December 21, 2020	—	—	—	—	—	The title was vacated due to a lack of defenses. Due to the difficulties of scheduling a 10-person match given the COVID-19 situation, the title would temporarily become the KO-D 8-Man Tag Team Championship.	
KO-D 8-Man Tag Team Championship
3	Shinya Aoki, Super Sasadango Machine, Antonio Honda and Kazuki Hirata	February 14, 2021	Kawasaki Strong 2021	Kawasaki, Japan	1 (1, 2, 1, 1)	42	0	Defeated Sanshiro Takagi, Danshoku Dino, Toru Owashi and Makoto Oishi in a No Disqualification match to win the vacant title. The title matches started being disputed between teams of four wrestlers due to the championship temporarily becoming an 8-Man Tag Team Championship.	
4	Team Thoroughbred (Sanshiro Takagi, Yukio Naya, Chikara and Yakan Nabe)	March 28, 2021	Judgement 2021: DDT 24th Anniversary	Tokyo, Japan	1	98	1		
5	Team Olympian (Yoshiaki Yatsu, Akito, Hiroshi Yamato and Keigo Nakamura)	July 4, 2021	King of DDT 2021 Final!!	Tokyo, Japan	1	122	1		
6	Toru Owashi, Antonio Honda, Kazuki Hirata and Yoshihiko	November 3, 2021	D-Oh Grand Prix 2021 II in Ota-ku	Tokyo, Japan	1 (1, 2, 2, 1)	137	1	On January 3, 2022, the title reverted back to its original form. Owashi, Honda, Hirata and Yoshihiko continued to defend the title as a four-man team.	
KO-D 10-Man Tag Team Championship
7	DDT Legend Army (Poison Sawada Julie, Takashi Sasaki, Gentaro, Mikami and Thanomsak Toba)	March 20, 2022	Judgement 2022: DDT 25th Anniversary	Tokyo, Japan	1	97	1	This was a 5-on-4 handicap match.	
8	Shinya Aoki and The37Kamiina (Mao, Yuki Ueno, Shunma Katsumata and Toy Kojima)	June 25, 2022	Dramatic Dream Tour 2022 in Yokohama	Yokohama, Japan	1 (2, 1, 1, 1, 1)	559	0		
9	Schadenfreude International (Masahiro Takanashi, Chris Brookes (Note: Brookes was scheduled to be part of the challenging team but had to pull out due to injury. Although he was replaced by Takayuki Ueki, he is still listed as an official champion.), Antonio Honda, Takeshi Masada and Mecha Mummy)	January 5, 2024	Sweet Dreams! 2024 Tour in Shinjuku	Tokyo, Japan	1 (1, 1, 3, 1, 1)	288	3	In the title defense, Takayuki Ueki filled in for Chris Brookes, while Yuni and Yoshihiko filled in for Mao and Shinya Aoki. Mecha Mummy is considered an associate of Schadenfreude International through their affiliation with Brookes' Baka Gaijin + Friends brand.	
10	Keigo Nakamura, To-y, Yuya Koroku, Yuki Ishida and Kazuma Sumi	October 19, 2024	DDT Pro-Wrestling in Ikebukuro Full Moon Festival 2024	Tokyo, Japan	1 (2, 2, 1, 1, 1)	435	1	Munetatsu Nakamura replaced Antonio Honda.	
11	Damnation T.A. (Daisuke Sasaki, Demus, Hideki Okatani, MJ Paul and Ilusion)	December 28, 2025	DDT Year End Dramatic Parade 2025	Nagoya, Japan	1	302+	1	Daichi Sato replaced Keigo Nakamura.	

== Combined reigns ==
As of October 26, 2026.

†	Indicates the current champion
(C)	Indicates the team captain

=== By team ===
Rank	Team	No. of reigns	Combined defenses	Combined days
1	Ken Ohka, Ladybeard, LiLiCo (C), Makoto Oishi and Super Sasadango Machine	1	1	770
2	Shinya Aoki and The37Kamiina (Mao, Yuki Ueno, Shunma Katsumata (C) and Toy Kojima)	1	0	559
3	Keigo Nakamura (C), To-y, Yuya Koroku, Yuki Ishida and Kazuma Sumi	1	1	435
4	Danshoku Dino (C), Asuka, Yuki Iino, Mizuki and Trans-Am★Hiroshi	1	0	414
5	Damnation T.A. † (Daisuke Sasaki (C), Demus, Hideki Okatani, MJ Paul and Ilusion)	1	1	302+
6	Schadenfreude International (Masahiro Takanashi (C), Chris Brookes, Antonio Honda, Takeshi Masada and Mecha Mummy)	1	3	288
7	Toru Owashi (C), Antonio Honda, Kazuki Hirata and Yoshihiko	1	1	137
8	Team Olympian (Yoshiaki Yatsu (C), Akito, Hiroshi Yamato and Keigo Nakamura)	1	1	122
9	Team Thoroughbred (Sanshiro Takagi (C), Yukio Naya, Chikara and Yakan Nabe)	1	1	98
10	DDT Legend Army (Poison Sawada Julie (C), Takashi Sasaki, Gentaro, Mikami and Thanomsak Toba)	1	1	97
11	Shinya Aoki (C), Super Sasadango Machine, Antonio Honda and Kazuki Hirata	1	0	42

=== By wrestler ===
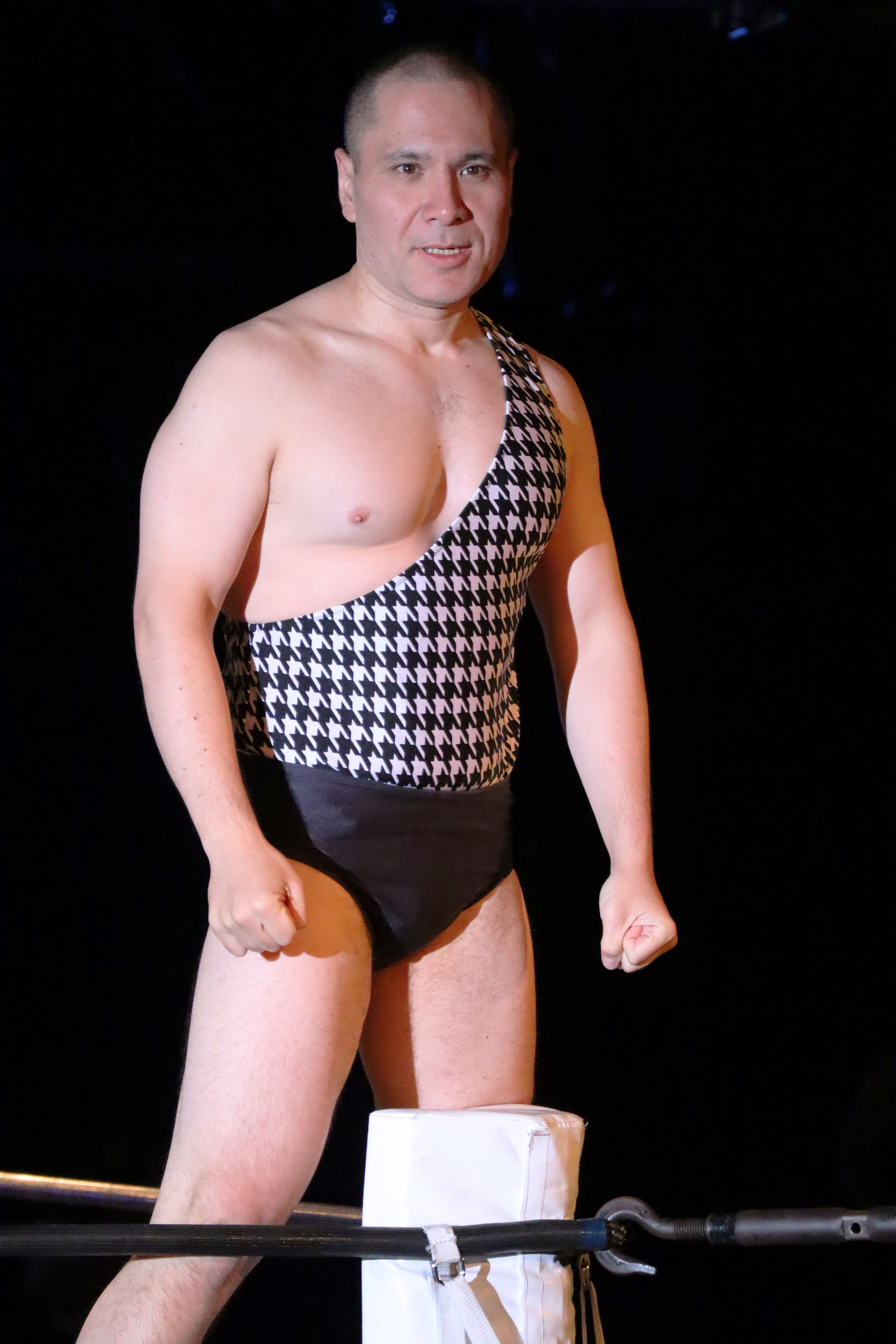
Record three-time champion Antonio Honda

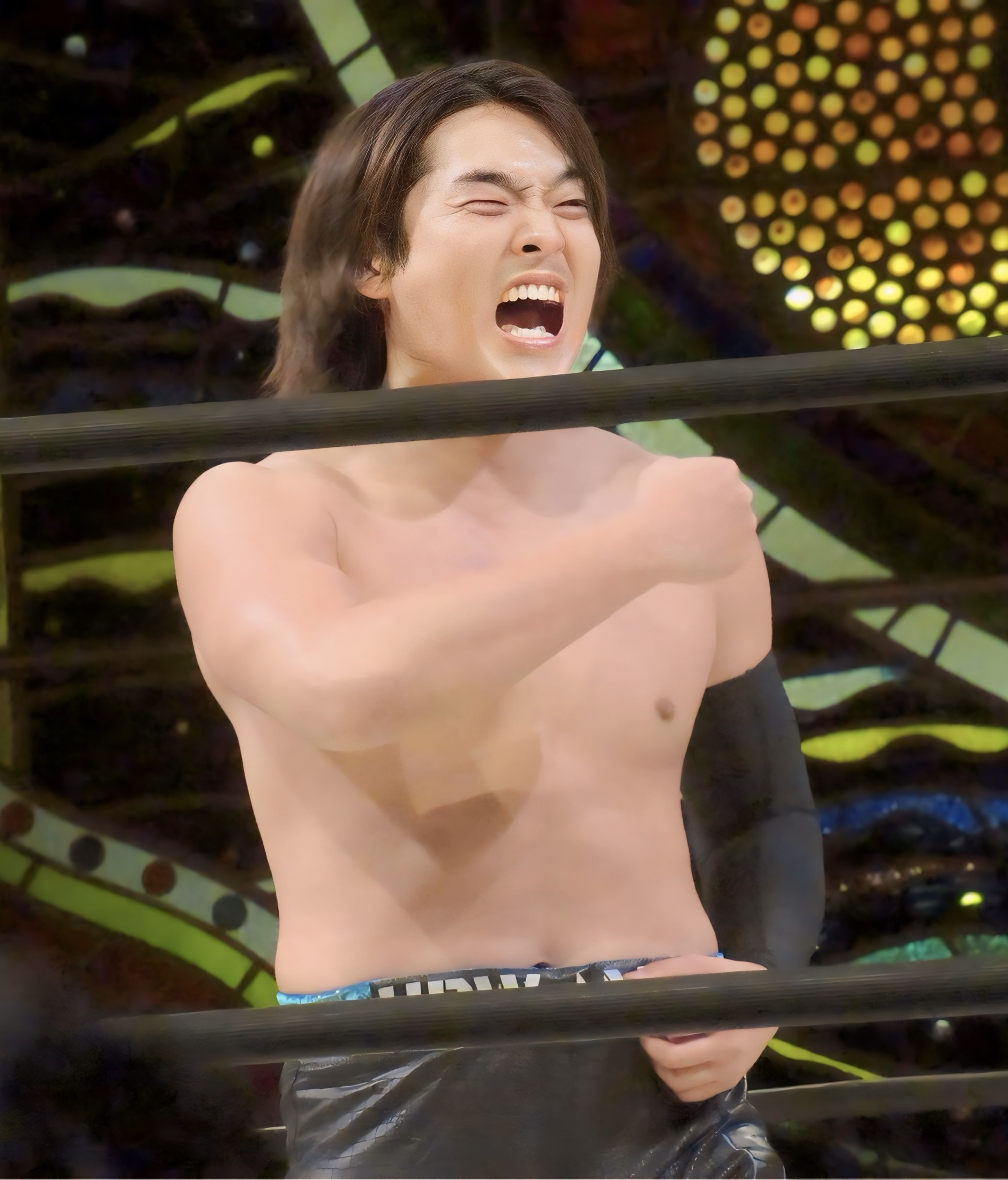
Longest reigning champion Toy Kojima

Rank	Wrestler	No. of reigns	Combined defenses	Combined days
1	Toy Kojima/To-y	2	1	994
2	Super Sasadango Machine	2	1	812
3	Ken Ohka	1	1	770
3	Ladybeard	1	1	770
3	LiLiCo	1	1	770
3	Makoto Oishi	1	1	770
7	Shinya Aoki	2	0	601
8	Mao	1	0	559
8	Shunma Katsumata	1	0	559
8	Yuki Ueno	1	0	559
11	Keigo Nakamura	2	2	557
12	Antonio Honda	3	3	467
13	Kazuma Sumi	1	1	435
13	Yuki Ishida	1	1	435
13	Yuya Koroku	1	1	435
16	Asuka	1	0	414
16	Danshoku Dino	1	0	414
16	Mizuki	1	0	414
16	Trans-Am★Hiroshi	1	0	414
16	Yuki Iino	1	0	414
21	Daisuke Sasaki †	1	1	302+
21	Demus †	1	1	302+
21	Hideki Okatani †	1	1	302+
21	MJ Paul †	1	1	302+
21	Ilusion †	1	1	302+
26	Chris Brookes	1	3	288
26	Masahiro Takanashi	1	3	288
26	Takeshi Masada	1	3	288
26	Mecha Mummy	1	3	288
30	Kazuki Hirata	2	1	179
31	Toru Owashi	1	1	137
31	Yoshihiko	1	1	137
33	Akito	1	1	122
33	Hiroshi Yamato	1	1	122
33	Yoshiaki Yatsu	1	1	122
36	Chikara	1	1	98
36	Sanshiro Takagi	1	1	98
36	Yakan Nabe	1	1	98
36	Yukio Naya	1	1	98
40	Gentaro	1	1	97
40	Mikami	1	1	97
40	Poison Sawada Julie	1	1	97
40	Takashi Sasaki	1	1	97
40	Thanomsak Toba	1	1	97

== See also ==
- KO-D 6-Man Tag Team Championship
