= Yusuke Okada (wrestler) =

Japanese professional wrestler

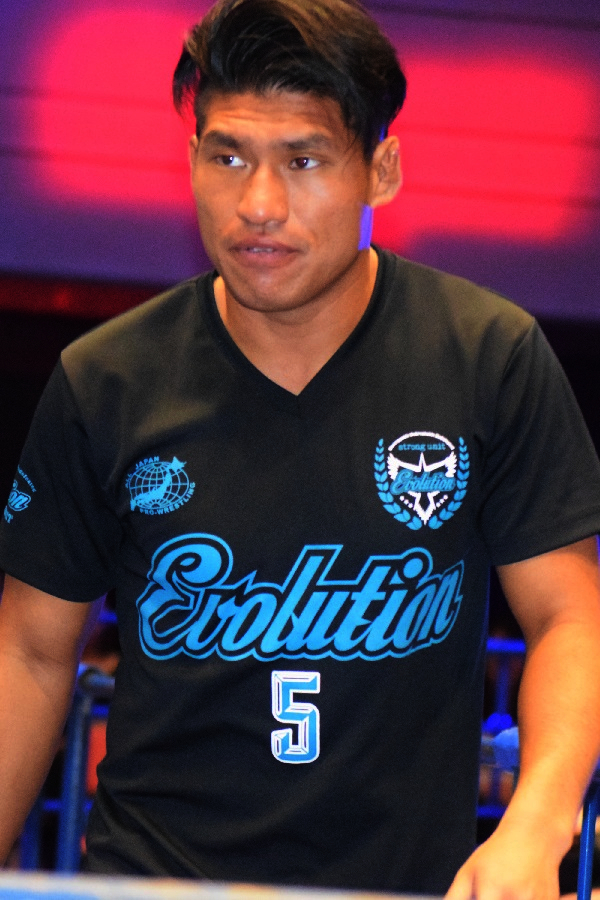
- Okada in 2018

Personal information
- Born: March 8, 1993 (age 33) Osaka, Japan
- Education: Ashiya University

Professional wrestling career
- Ring name: Yusuke Okada
- Billed height: 1.70 m (5 ft 7 in)
- Billed weight: 82 kg (181 lb)
- Trained by: Atsushi Aoki
- Debut: January 9, 2017

Japanese name
- Kanji: 岡田 佑介
- Hiragana: おかだ ゆうすけ
- Katakana: オカダ ユウスケ
Transcriptions
- Romanization: Okada Yūsuke

Yusuke Okada (岡田佑介, Okada Yūsuke; born March 8, 1993) is a Japanese professional wrestler who works for DDT Pro-Wrestling (DDT), where he is a member of the Burning stable.

== Early life ==
Okada attended the Kobe Kōryō Gakuen High School where he was part of the soccer team. Among his teammates was Ataru Esaka who later joined the Urawa Red Diamonds. After graduating from Ashiya University, he became a police officer, but left the force to join All Japan Pro Wrestling (AJPW) in July 2016.

== Professional wrestling career ==
=== All Japan Pro Wrestling (2017–2020) ===
Okada made his official professional wrestling debut for AJPW on January 9, 2017, at the Yokohama Radiant Hall, in a losing effort against Yuma Aoyagi. On March 25, at the Condition Green event produced by Hikaru Sato, he faced Kazuhiro Tamura. On August 27, Okada took part in the AJPW 45th Anniversary event at the Ryōgoku Kokugikan, where he faced Keiichi Sato in the pre-show, losing in just over three minutes. In November, Okada teamed with Koji Iwamoto in the Jr. Tag Battle of Glory tournament. They scored two points after getting only one victory over Black Spider VII and Black Tiger VII. On December 3, he formed a tag team called "W Okada" with Tsuyoshi Okada, and they were defeated by Atsushi Aoki and Rey Paloma.

==== Evolution (2018–2020) ====
In 2018, Okada asked Suwama to join the Evolution stable. He was initially turned down, but after the penultimate match of the February 3 event in the Yokohama Bunka Gymnasium, he officially joined Evolution as a reward for having stood up to Kazuyuki Fujita, Kendo Kashin and Nosawa Rongai. Later in the month, Okada entered the 2018 Jr. Battle of Glory, winning one match against Keiichi Sato. On April 30, Okada suffered a right fibula fracture that sidelined him for six months. He made his return on October 6. On November 17, Okada defeated the debuting Hokuto Omori.

In the 2019 Jr. Battle of Glory, he won two of his five matches and failed to advance to the final. In July 2019, Okada was scheduled to take part in the Jr. Tag Battle of Glory with Franceso Akira, but after the untimely death of Atsushi Aoki on June 3, he asked to instead team with Aoki's partner Hikaru Sato and went on the win the tournament by defeating Kagetora and Yosuke♡Santa Maria in the final.

In 2020, Suwama started expressing frustration regarding Okada's increasing defeats, and after another defeat at the hands of JIN (Ayato Yoshida, Fuminori Abe, Jake Lee and Koji Iwamoto) on July 13, Okada announced he was leaving Evolution.

==== Yoshitatsu Kingdom and departure (2020) ====
After his departure from Evolution, Okada regularly teamed with Yoshitatsu and was considered an associate of the Yoshitatsu Kingdom stable. On October 17, after being involved in a Captain's Fall six-man tag team match for Yoshitatsu's Gaora TV Championship, he joined Yoshitatsu Kingdom. On December 8, Okada announced that his contract had expired and that he would be leaving AJPW at the end of the year. Okada wrestled his last match with the company at Prime Night 2020, on December 13. He teamed with Yoshitatsu and Chikara in a losing effort to Unchain (Jun Kasai, Masashi Takeda and Kenji Fukimoto). He was originally scheduled to take part in the 2020 Jr. Tag Battle of Glory, on December 27, teaming with former police officer Takayuki Ueki.

=== DDT Pro-Wrestling (2021–present) ===
On January 3, 2021, Okada appeared at a DDT Pro-Wrestling (DDT) press conference to announce he would be touring with the company. He debuted for DDT on January 9, at the Go to DDT! vol. 1 event in Korakuen Hall, during which he teamed with Makoto Oishi and Mizuki Watase to defeat Damnation (Tetsuya Endo, Daisuke Sasaki and Nobuhiro Shimatani). On March 14, he wrestled Yuki Ueno for the DDT Universal Championship in the main event of Day Dream Believer, but failed to win the title. On March 27, Okada announced he had officially signed with DDT. On July 24, Okada was invited in the Junretsu stable by Jun Akiyama who was his mentor in AJPW. On October 12, at Get Alive, Junretsu failed to capture the KO-D 8-Man Tag Team Championship from Team Olympian (Yoshiaki Yatsu, Akito, Hiroshi Yamato and Keigo Nakamura). As a result, and as per Junretsu leader Makoto Oishi's decision, the stable disbanded on October 23. On December 7, DDT announced that, at the request of Tetsuya Endo and Jun Akiyama, Kenta Kobashi had endorsed the reformation of the Burning stable (originally formed in 1998, in AJPW) for its fourth incarnation. Okada was invited to join the stable alongside rookie Yuya Koroku.

Throughout early 2022, Okada mainly represented his new stable in tag team matches. On May 1, at Mega Max Bump 2022 in Yokohama, Okada and Akiyama unsuccessfully challenged the Calamari Drunken Kings (Chris Brookes and Masahiro Takanashi) for the KO-D Tag Team Championship. On July 24, at Summer Vacation 2022, Okada unsuccessfully challenged Takanashi for the DDT Universal Championship. On December 29, at Never Mind 2022, he won the KO-D 6-Man Tag Team Championship with Tetsuya Endo and Kotaro Suzuki by defeating Naruki Doi, Toru Owashi and Kazuki Hirata.

On January 29, 2023, at Sweet Dreams!, Okada, Endo and Suzuki retained their title against Pheromones (Danshoku "Dandy" Dino, Koju "Shining Ball" Takeda and Yuki "Sexy" Iino). The Burning trio lost the title to Shinya Aoki, Super Sasadango Machine and Yuki Ueno on February 26, at Into The Fight.

== Championships and accomplishments ==
- All Japan Pro Wrestling

- Jr. Tag Battle of Glory (2019) – with Hikaru Sato

- DDT Pro-Wrestling

- Ironman Heavymetalweight Championship (1 time)
- KO-D 6-Man Tag Team Championship (1 time) – with Tetsuya Endo and Kotaro Suzuki

== Luchas de Apuestas record ==
Winner (wager)	Loser (wager)	Location	Event	Date	Notes
Yusuke Okada (hair)	Seigo Tachibana (hair)	Chiba, Japan	Summer Action Series 2020: Chiba Extra Dream 24	July 18, 2020	
