= KO-D 6-Man Tag Team Championship =

Japanese professional wrestling championship

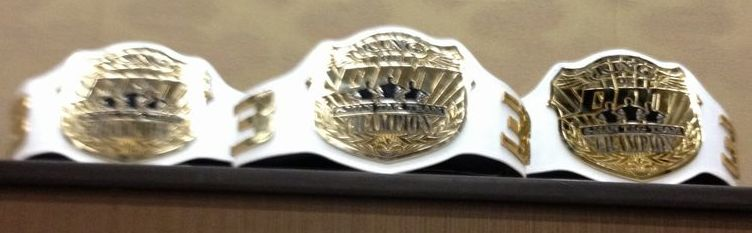
- The KO-D 6-Man Tag Team Championship belts

Details
- Promotion: CyberFight
- Brand: DDT Pro-Wrestling
- Date established: December 23, 2012
- Current champions: Damnation T.A (Daisuke Sasaki, Hideki Okatani and Ilusion)
- Date won: September 21, 2026
Statistics
- First champions: Team Dream Futures (Keisuke Ishii, Shigehiro Irie and Soma Takao)
- Most reigns: As tag team (7 reigns): Shuten Doji (Kudo, Masa Takanashi and Yukio Sakaguchi); As individual (9 reigns): Yukio Sakaguchi and Daisuke Sasaki
- Longest reign: All Out (Konosuke Takeshita, Shunma Katsumata and Yuki Iino) (272 days)
- Shortest reign: Happy Motel (Antonio Honda, Konosuke Takeshita and Tetsuya Endo) (7 days)
- Oldest champion: Jun Akiyama (54 years, 38 days)
- Youngest champion: Yuni (17 years, 40 days)
- Heaviest champion: Akebono (210 kg (460 lb))
- Lightest champion: Yuni (53 kg (117 lb))

The KO-D (King of DDT) 6-Man Tag Team Championship (Japanese: KO-D6人タッグ王座, Hepburn: KO-D Roku-nin Taggu Ōza) is a professional wrestling championship owned by the DDT Pro-Wrestling (DDT) promotion. The current champions are Damnation T.A (Daisuke Sasaki, Hideki Okatani, and Ilusion), who are in their second reign as a team but ninth for Sasaki, third for Okatani, and second for Ilusion individually. They won the title by defeating Strange Love Connection (Kanon, Yukio Naya, and Viento Levante) at Dramatic Infinity on September 21, 2026.

The title was first announced at Never Mind 2012 on December 23, making it the promotion's fifth active title. The first champions were crowned on January 12, 2013. The title has also been defended in All Japan Pro Wrestling (AJPW) as part of a relationship between DDT and AJPW. The championship is contested for by teams of three wrestlers. Like most professional wrestling championships, the title is won as a result of a scripted match.

== History ==
DDT Pro-Wrestling (DDT) had previously promoted matches for the Jiyugaoka 6-Person Tag Team Championship, the Sea Of Japan 6-Person Tag Team Championship and the UWA World Trios Championship, but although all three titles were last held by DDT wrestlers, none of them have been seen in the promotion since the end of 2010. The inaugural KO-D 6-Man Tag Team Champions were determined on January 12, 2013, in a four-team single-elimination tournament, which saw Team Dream Futures (Keisuke Ishii, Shigehiro Irie and Soma Takao) defeat Team Shiro (Akito, Makoto Oishi and Sanshiro Takagi) in the finals to win the title.

== Reigns ==
As of November 21, 2026, there have been a total of 62 reigns shared among 74 wrestlers and 46 teams. The current champions are Damnation T.A (Daisuke Sasaki, Hideki Okatani, and Ilusion), who are in their second reign as a team but ninth for Sasaki, third for Okatani, and second for Ilusion individually. They won the title by defeating Strange Love Connection (Kanon, Yukio Naya, and Viento Levante) at Dramatic Infinity in Tokyo, Japan, on September 21, 2026

Key
No.	Overall reign number
Reign	Reign number for the specific team—reign numbers for the individuals are in parentheses, if different
Days	Number of days held
Defenses	Number of successful defenses
+	Current reign is changing daily

No.	Champion	Championship change			Reign statistics			Notes	Ref.
No.	Champion	Date	Event	Location	Reign	Days	Defenses	Notes	Ref.
1	Team Dream Futures (Keisuke Ishii, Shigehiro Irie and Soma Takao)	January 12, 2013	Osaka 24 Ward Tour: Nishi Ward	Osaka, Japan	1	15	0	Defeated Team Shiro (Akito, Makoto Oishi and Sanshiro Takagi) in the finals of a four-team tournament to become the inaugural champions.	
2	Monster Army (Antonio Honda, Daisuke Sasaki and Yuji Hino)	January 27, 2013	Sweet Dreams! 2013	Tokyo, Japan	1	119	2		
3	Golden☆Rendez-Vous (Gota Ihashi, Kenny Omega and Kota Ibushi)	May 26, 2013	Road to Ryōgoku in Hiroshima: Dramatic Dream Toukasan	Hiroshima, Japan	1	28	0		
4	Monster Army (Antonio Honda, Hoshitango and Yuji Hino)	June 23, 2013	What Are You Doing 2013	Tokyo, Japan	1 (2, 1, 2)	28	0		
5	Ten Million Gay Powers (Danshoku Dino, Kensuke Sasaki and Makoto Oishi)	July 21, 2013	Road to Ryōgoku 2013	Tokyo, Japan	1	28	0		
6	Akebono, Sanshiro Takagi and Toru Owashi	August 18, 2013	Ryōgoku Peter Pan 2013	Tokyo, Japan	1	127	2		
7	Team Homo Sapiens (Aja Kong, Danshoku Dino and Makoto Oishi)	December 23, 2013	Never Mind 2013	Tokyo, Japan	1 (1, 2, 2)	62	1		
8	Team Dream Futures (Keisuke Ishii, Shigehiro Irie and Soma Takao)	February 23, 2014	Into The Fight 2014	Tokyo, Japan	2	48	1		
9	Golden☆Storm Riders (Daisuke Sasaki, Kenny Omega and Kota Ibushi)	April 12, 2014	Pro-Wrestling Road to Saitama Super Arena 2nd	Kasukabe, Japan	1 (2, 2, 2)	22	1		
10	Shuten Doji (Kudo, Yukio Sakaguchi and Masa Takanashi)	May 4, 2014	Road to Ryogoku in Sendai: Dramatic Dream Tan	Sendai, Japan	1	70	1		
11	Happy Motel (Antonio Honda, Konosuke Takeshita and Tetsuya Endo)	July 13, 2014	Road to Ryōgoku in Osaka: Dramatic Dream Tsutenkaku	Osaka, Japan	1 (3, 1, 1)	7	0		
12	Shuten Doji (Kudo, Yukio Sakaguchi and Masa Takanashi)	July 20, 2014	Road to Ryōgoku 2014	Tokyo, Japan	2	28	0	This was a three-way match, also involving Team Dream Futures (Keisuke Ishii, Shigehiro Irie and Soma Takao).	
13	Team Dream Futures (Keisuke Ishii, Shigehiro Irie and Soma Takao)	August 17, 2014	Ryōgoku Peter Pan 2014	Tokyo, Japan	3	42	2		
14	T2Hii (Sanshiro Takagi, Toru Owashi and Kazuki Hirata)	September 28, 2014	DDT Dramatic General Election 2014 Final Voting Day	Tokyo, Japan	1 (2, 2, 1)	63	1		
15	Gorgeous Matsuno, Brahman Shu and Brahman Kei	November 30, 2014	God Bless DDT 2014	Tokyo, Japan	1	77	2		
16	Shuten Doji (Kudo, Yukio Sakaguchi and Masa Takanashi)	February 15, 2015	Saitama Super DDT 2015	Saitama, Japan	3	14	0		
17	Team Dream Futures (Keisuke Ishii, Shigehiro Irie and Soma Takao)	March 1, 2015	Osaka 24 Ward Tour: Minato Ward	Osaka, Japan	4	20	0		
18	Shuten Doji (Kudo, Yukio Sakaguchi and Masa Takanashi)	March 21, 2015	Saitama Slam Special! 2015	Kasukabe, Japan	4	21	0		
19	Team Dream Futures (Keisuke Ishii, Shigehiro Irie and Soma Takao)	April 11, 2015	Road to Ryōgoku 2015 in Kokura	Kitakyushu, Japan	5	169	5		
20	#OhkaEmpire (Danshoku Dino, Ken Ohka and Super Sasadango Machine)	September 27, 2015	Who's Gonna Top?	Tokyo, Japan	1 (3, 1, 1)	56	1		
21	T2Hii (Kazuki Hirata, Sanshiro Takagi and Toru Owashi)	November 22, 2015	Three Dreams 2015	Hiroshima, Japan	2 (1, 3, 3)	42	1		
22	#OhkaEmpire (Kenso, Danshoku Dino and Super Sasadango Machine)	January 3, 2016	New Year Otoshidama Special! All Seats 2,000 Yen!! 2016	Tokyo, Japan	1 (1, 4, 2)	35	0		
23	T2Hii (Kazuki Hirata, Sanshiro Takagi and Toru Owashi)	February 7, 2016	Saitama Slam! Vol. 8	Kawaguchi, Japan	3 (1, 4, 4)	21	0	This was an elimination match.	
24	Kazusada Higuchi, Kouki Iwasaki and Shunma Katsumata	February 28, 2016	Into The Fight 2016	Tokyo, Japan	1	77	2		
25	Team Dream Futures (Keisuke Ishii, Shigehiro Irie and Soma Takao)	May 15, 2016	Friendship, Effort, Victory! in Nagoya 2016	Nagoya, Japan	6	14	1		
—	Vacated	May 29, 2016	Audience 2016	Tokyo, Japan	—	—	—	Team Dream Futures vacated the titles due to splitting up as a team.	
26	Damnation (Daisuke Sasaki, Mad Paulie and Tetsuya Endo)	August 6, 2016	Saitama Slam! Vol. 13	Kasukabe, Japan	1 (3, 1, 2)	127	1	Damnation defeated Shuten Doji (Kota Umeda, Masahiro Takanashi and Yukio Sakaguchi) in the finals of a tournament to win the vacant titles.	
27	Shuten Doji (Kudo, Masahiro Takanashi and Yukio Sakaguchi)	December 11, 2016	Road to Super Arena	Fukuoka, Japan	5	42	2		
28	Team DNA (Kazusada Higuchi, Kouki Iwasaki and Mizuki Watase)	January 22, 2017	Best Western Lariat Series 2017	Tokyo, Japan	1 (2, 2, 1)	57	1	This was a three-way match, also involving Antonio Honda, Konosuke Takeshita and Trans-Am★Hiroshi.	
29	NωA (Makoto Oishi, Mao and Shunma Katsumata)	March 20, 2017	Judgement 2017: DDT 20th Anniversary	Saitama, Japan	1 (3, 1, 2)	97	3	This was a three-way match, also involving Smile Squash (Akito, Soma Takao and Yasu Urano).	
30	Shuten Doji (Kudo, Masahiro Takanashi and Yukio Sakaguchi)	June 25, 2017	King of DDT 2017	Tokyo, Japan	6	107	3		
—	Vacated	October 10, 2017	—	—	—	—	—	Title vacated when Kudo suffered a concussion and failed to make a scheduled title defense.	
31	All Out (Akito, Diego and Konosuke Takeshita)	November 2, 2017	Shin-kiba! I'm Back	Tokyo, Japan	1 (1, 1, 2)	38	1	Defeated Damnation (Daisuke Sasaki, Mad Paulie and Shuji Ishikawa) to win the vacant titles.	
32	Shuten Doji (Kudo, Masahiro Takanashi and Yukio Sakaguchi)	December 10, 2017	Wrestling Tonkotsu 2017	Fukuoka, Japan	7	105	1		
33	Koju Takeda, Kota Umeda and Yuki Ueno	March 25, 2018	Judgement 2018: DDT 21st Anniversary	Tokyo, Japan	1	92	1		
34	All Out (Akito, Shunma Katsumata and Konosuke Takeshita)	June 25, 2018	What Are You Doing 2018	Tokyo, Japan	1 (2, 3, 3)	36	1		
—	Vacated	July 31, 2018	—	—	—	—	—	Title vacated when Takeshita injured his right shoulder.	
35	Damnation (Tetsuya Endo, Mad Paulie and Soma Takao)	September 4, 2018	MajiManji #16	Tokyo, Japan	1 (3, 2, 7)	54	1	Defeated Shuten Doji (Kudo, Masahiro Takanashi and Yukio Sakaguchi) to win the vacant titles.	
36	#StrongHearts (Cima, T-Hawk and Duan Yingnan)	October 28, 2018	DDT Live! MajiManji #21 Korakuen Hall Special	Tokyo, Japan	1	67	0		
37	All Out (Akito, Konosuke Takeshita and Yuki Iino)	January 3, 2019	DDT Live! MajiManji Super: New Year Special	Tokyo, Japan	1 (3, 4, 1)	77	2		
38	Sendai Girls' Pro Wrestling (Chihiro Hashimoto, Dash Chisako and Meiko Satomura)	March 21, 2019	Into The Fight 2019	Tokyo, Japan	1	95	1		
39	All Out (Konosuke Takeshita, Shunma Katsumata and Yuki Iino)	June 24, 2019	All Out × Sendai Girls' Pro-Wrestling	Tokyo, Japan	1 (5, 4, 2)	272	3		
40	#DamnHearts (Tetsuya Endo, T-Hawk and El Lindaman)	March 22, 2020	Dramatic Hyakumangoku! 2020	Tokyo, Japan	1 (4, 2, 1)	90	2		
41	Eruption (Kazusada Higuchi, Yukio Sakaguchi and Saki Akai)	June 20, 2020	DDT TV Show! #7	Tokyo, Japan	1 (3, 8, 1)	147	3		
42	Wakate Tsūshin Sedai (Akito, Kazuki Hirata and Shota)	November 14, 2020	DDT TV Show! #12	Tokyo, Japan	1 (4, 4, 1)	120	2		
43	Damnation (Tetsuya Endo, Soma Takao and Yuji Hino)	March 14, 2021	Day Dream Believer 2021	Tokyo, Japan	1 (5, 8, 1)	174	3		
—	Vacated	September 4, 2021	Dramatic Survivor 2021	Nagoya, Japan	—	—	—	As a result of having lost the Dramatic Survivor tournament, Damnation were forced to disband. The titles were immediately vacated.	
44	Pheromones (Danshoku "Dandy" Dino, Yuki "Sexy" Iino and Yumehito "Fantastic" Imanari)	November 3, 2021	D-Oh Grand Prix 2021 II in Ota-ku	Tokyo, Japan	1 (5, 3, 1)	158	2	Defeated Sanshiro Takagi, Shinya Aoki and Yusuke Okada to win the vacant titles.	
45	Damnation T.A (Daisuke Sasaki, Minoru Fujita and MJ Paul)	April 10, 2022	April Fool 2022	Tokyo, Japan	1 (4, 1, 3)	11	0		
—	Vacated	April 21, 2022	—	—	—	—	—	Title vacated when Fujita suffered an injury.	
46	Damnation T.A (Daisuke Sasaki, MJ Paul and Kanon)	May 22, 2022	Audience 2022	Tokyo, Japan	1 (5, 4, 1)	139	2	Defeated Eruption (Yukio Sakaguchi, Kazusada Higuchi and Hideki Okatani) in the final of a four-team tournament to win the vacant titles.	
47	Ω (Yuji Hino, Makoto Oishi and Shiori Asahi)	October 8, 2022	Get Alive 2022	Tokyo, Japan	1 (4, 4, 1)	35	0		
48	Naruki Doi, Toru Owashi and Kazuki Hirata	November 12, 2022	D-Oh Grand Prix 2022 in Osaka	Osaka, Japan	1 (1, 5, 5)	47	0		
49	Burning (Tetsuya Endo, Kotaro Suzuki and Yusuke Okada)	December 29, 2022	Never Mind 2022	Tokyo, Japan	1 (6, 1, 1)	59	1		
50	Shinya Aoki, Super Sasadango Machine and Yuki Ueno	February 26, 2023	Into The Fight 2023	Tokyo, Japan	1 (1, 3, 2)	77	1		
51	Harimau (Kazusada Higuchi, Ryota Nakatsu and Yuki Ishida)	May 14, 2023	Only We × DDT Special: Yuji Hino's Debut 20th Anniversary	Chiba, Japan	1 (4, 1, 1)	70	0		
52	Eruption (Yukio Sakaguchi, Saki Akai and Hideki Okatani)	July 23, 2023	Wrestle Peter Pan 2023	Tokyo, Japan	1 (9, 2, 1)	112	5		
—	Vacated	November 12, 2023	Ultimate Party 2023	Tokyo, Japan	—	—	—	Title vacated after Saki Akai's retirement from professional wrestling.	
53	D・O・A (Jun Akiyama, Danshoku Dino and Makoto Oishi)	November 16, 2023	Get Alive 2023 Tour in Shinjuku	Tokyo, Japan	1 (1, 6, 5)	162	4	Defeated The37Kamiina (Yuki Ueno, Mao and Toy Kojima) in the final of a four-team tournament to win the vacant titles.	
54	Damnation T.A (Daisuke Sasaki, Kanon and MJ Paul)	April 26, 2024	DDT × Zeekstar Tokyo Special Event "DDZT"	Tokyo, Japan	2 (6, 2, 5)	40	0		
55	Smile Squash (Akito, Harashima and Yasu Urano)	June 5, 2024	What Are You Doing? 2024 Tour in Shinjuku	Tokyo, Japan	1 (5, 1, 1)	46	0		
56	Damnation T.A (Daisuke Sasaki, Kanon and MJ Paul)	July 21, 2024	Wrestle Peter Pan 2024	Tokyo, Japan	3 (7, 3, 6)	219	4	This was an elimination four-way tag team match also involving Aja Kong and The37Kamiina (Shunma Katsumata and To-y), and Schadenfreude International (Antonio Honda, Masahiro Takanashi and Takeshi Masada).	
—	Vacated	February 25, 2025	—	—	—	—	—	The title was vacated after Kanon's expulsion from Damnation T.A. at Next Generation 2025: Kisaragi Roman, on February 23.	
57	NωA Jr. (Shunma Katsumata, Yuni and Kazuma Sumi)	March 20, 2025	Judgement 2025	Tokyo, Japan	1 (5, 1, 1)	38	0	Defeated Harimau (Kazusada Higuchi, Ryota Nakatsu and Yuki Ishida) to win the vacant title.	
58	Damnation T.A (Daisuke Sasaki, Hideki Okatani and Ilusion)	April 27, 2025	Sapporo Night Crush	Sapporo, Japan	1 (8, 2, 1)	136	3		
—	Vacated	September 10, 2025	—	—	—	—	—	The title was vacated after Daisuke Sasaki suffered a fractured rib at Wrestle Peter Pan 2025.	
59	Kaisei Takechi and The37Kamiina (To-y and Yuki Ueno)	September 28, 2025	Dramatic Infinity 2025	Tokyo, Japan	1 (1, 1, 3)	164	2	Defeated Damnation T.A. (MJ Paul, Hideki Okatani and Ilusion) to win the vacant titles.	
60	Paleyouth (Takeshi Masada, Yuya Koroku and Daichi Sato)	March 11, 2026	Ichi ka Bachi ka 2026	Tokyo, Japan	1	153	6		
61	Strange Love Connection (Kanon, Yukio Naya, and Viento Levante)	August 11, 2026	Wrestle Peter Pan 2026	Tokyo, Japan	1 (4, 1, 1)	41	1		
62	Damnation T.A (Daisuke Sasaki, Hideki Okatani and Ilusion)	September 20, 2026	Dramatic Infinity 2026	Tokyo, Japan	2 (9, 3, 2)	61+	1		

== Combined reigns ==
As of November 21, 2026.

†	Indicates the current champions

=== By team ===
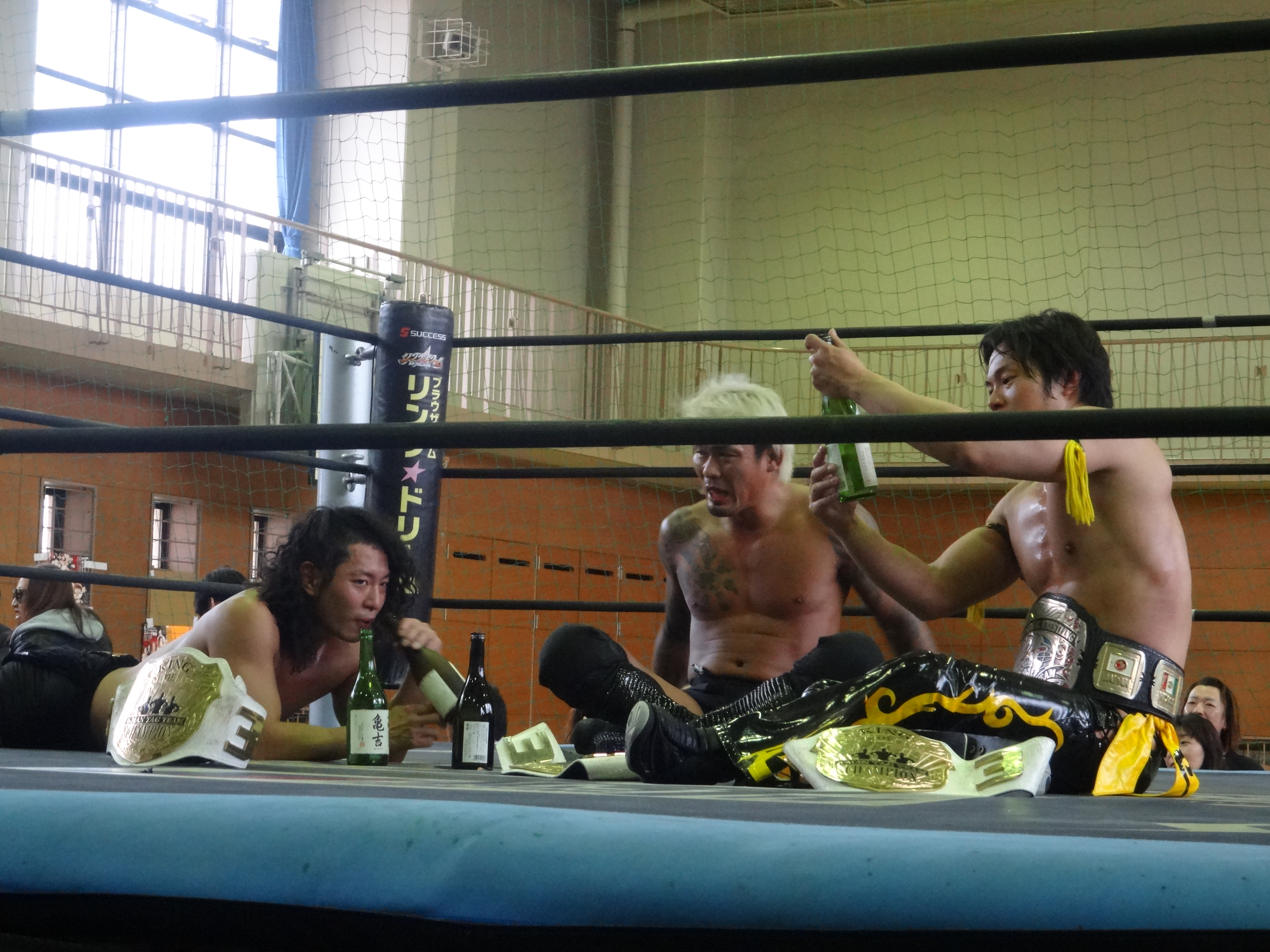
Record seven-time champions as a team, Shuten Doji (Kudo, Masa Takanashi and Yukio Sakaguchi).

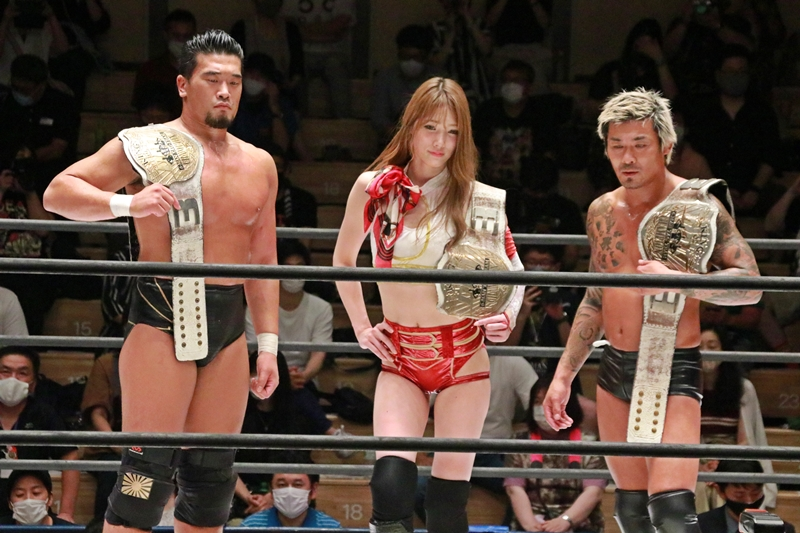
Former champions, Eruption (Kazusada Higuchi, Saki Akai and Yukio Sakaguchi.

Rank	Team	No. of reigns	Combined defenses	Combined days
1	Damnation T.A (Daisuke Sasaki, MJ Paul and Kanon)	3	6	398
2	Shuten Doji (Kudo, Masa Takanashi/Masahiro Takanashi and Yukio Sakaguchi)	7	7	387
3	Team Dream Futures (Keisuke Ishii, Shigehiro Irie and Soma Takao)	6	8	308
4	All Out (Konosuke Takeshita, Shunma Katsumata and Yuki Iino)	1	3	272
5	Damnation T.A † (Daisuke Sasaki, Hideki Okatani and Ilusion)	2	4	197+
6	Damnation (Tetsuya Endo, Soma Takao and Yuji Hino)	1	3	174
7	Kaisei Takechi and The37Kamiina (To-y and Yuki Ueno)	1	2	164
8	D・O・A (Jun Akiyama, Danshoku Dino and Makoto Oishi)	1	3	163
9	Pheromones (Danshoku "Dandy" Dino, Yuki "Sexy" Iino and Yumehito "Fantastic" Imanari)	1	2	158
10	Paleyouth (Takeshi Masada, Yuya Koroku and Daichi Sato)	1	6	153
11	Eruption (Kazusada Higuchi, Yukio Sakaguchi and Saki Akai)	1	3	147
12	Akebono, Sanshiro Takagi and Toru Owashi	1	2	127
12	Damnation (Daisuke Sasaki, Mad Paulie and Tetsuya Endo)	1	1	127
14	T2Hii (Kazuki Hirata, Sanshiro Takagi and Toru Owashi)	3	2	126
15	Wakate Tsūshin Sedai (Akito, Kazuki Hirata and Shota)	1	2	120
16	Monster Army (Antonio Honda, Daisuke Sasaki and Yuji Hino)	1	2	119
17	Eruption (Yukio Sakaguchi, Saki Akai and Hideki Okatani)	1	5	112
18	NωA (Makoto Oishi, Mao and Shunma Katsumata)	1	3	97
19	Sendai Girls' Pro Wrestling (Chihiro Hashimoto, Dash Chisako and Meiko Satomura)	1	1	95
20	Koju Takeda, Kota Umeda and Yuki Ueno	1	1	92
21	#DamnHearts (Tetsuya Endo, T-Hawk and El Lindaman)	1	2	90
22	All Out (Akito, Konosuke Takeshita and Yuki Iino)	1	2	77
22	Gorgeous Matsuno, Brahman Shu and Brahman Kei	1	2	77
22	Kazusada Higuchi, Kouki Iwasaki and Shunma Katsumata	1	2	77
22	Shinya Aoki, Super Sasadango Machine and Yuki Ueno	1	1	77
26	Harimau (Kazusada Higuchi, Ryota Nakatsu and Yuki Ishida)	1	0	70
27	#StrongHearts (Cima, T-Hawk and Duan Yingnan)	1	0	67
28	Team Homo Sapiens (Aja Kong, Danshoku Dino and Makoto Oishi)	1	1	62
29	Burning (Tetsuya Endo, Kotaro Suzuki and Yusuke Okada)	1	1	59
30	Team DNA (Kazusada Higuchi, Kouki Iwasaki and Mizuki Watase)	1	1	57
31	#OhkaEmpire (Danshoku Dino, Ken Ohka and Super Sasadango Machine)	1	1	56
32	Damnation (Mad Paulie, Tetsuya Endo and Soma Takao)	1	1	54
33	Naruki Doi, Toru Owashi and Kazuki Hirata	1	0	47
34	Smile Squash (Akito, Harashima and Yasu Urano)	1	0	46
35	Strange Love Connection (Kanon, Yukio Naya, and Viento Levante)	1	1	41
36	All Out (Akito, Diego and Konosuke Takeshita)	1	1	38
36	NωA Jr. (Shunma Katsumata, Yuni and Kazuma Sumi)	1	0	38
38	All Out (Akito, Shunma Katsumata and Konosuke Takeshita)	1	1	36
39	#OhkaEmpire (Kenso, Danshoku Dino and Super Sasadango Machine)	1	0	35
39	Ω (Yuji Hino, Makoto Oishi and Shiori Asahi)	1	0	35
41	Ten Million Gay Powers (Danshoku Dino, Kensuke Sasaki and Makoto Oishi)	1	0	28
41	Golden☆Rendez-Vous (Gota Ihashi, Kenny Omega and Kota Ibushi)	1	0	28
41	Monster Army (Antonio Honda, Hoshitango and Yuji Hino)	1	0	28
44	Golden☆Storm Riders (Daisuke Sasaki, Kenny Omega and Kota Ibushi)	1	0	22
45	Damnation T.A (Daisuke Sasaki, Minoru Fujita and MJ Paul)	1	0	11
46	Happy Motel (Antonio Honda, Konosuke Takeshita and Tetsuya Endo)	1	0	7

=== By wrestler ===
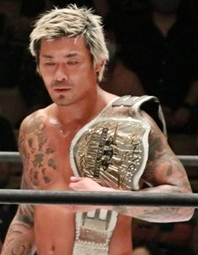
Record-tying nine-time champion, Yukio Sakaguchi.

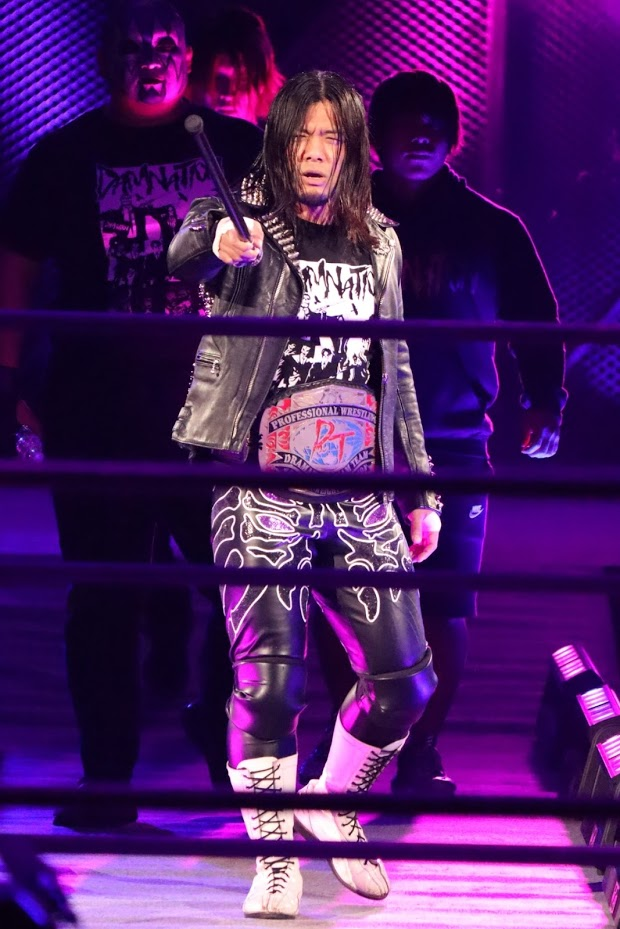
Record-tying nine-time and longest combined days as champion at 874+, Daisuke Sasaki.

Rank	Team	No. of reigns	Combined defenses	Combined days
1	Daisuke Sasaki †	9	14	874+
2	Danshoku Dino/Danshoku "Dandy" Dino	6	7	699
3	Yukio Sakaguchi	9	15	646
4	Mad Paulie/MJ Paul	6	8	589
5	Soma Takao	8	11	536
6	Shunma Katsumata	5	8	520
7	Tetsuya Endo	6	8	511
8	Yuki Iino/Yuki "Sexy" Iino	3	7	507
9	Kanon	4	7	439
10	Konosuke Takeshita	5	7	430
11	Makoto Oishi	5	7	414
12	Kudo	7	7	387
12	Masa Takanashi/Masahiro Takanashi	7	7	387
14	Yuji Hino	4	5	356
15	Kazusada Higuchi	4	6	351
16	Yuki Ueno	3	4	333
17	Akito	5	6	318
18	Hideki Okatani †	3	9	309+
19	Shigehiro Irie	6	8	308
19	Keisuke Ishii	6	8	308
21	Toru Owashi	5	4	300
22	Kazuki Hirata	5	4	293
23	Saki Akai	2	8	259
24	Sanshiro Takagi	4	4	253
25	Ilusion †	2	4	197+
26	Super Sasadango Machine	3	2	168
27	Kaisei Takechi	1	2	164
27	To-y	1	2	164
29	Jun Akiyama	1	3	163
30	Yumehito "Fantastic" Imanari	1	2	158
31	T-Hawk	2	2	157
32	Antonio Honda	3	2	154
33	Yuya Koroku	1	6	153
33	Takeshi Masada	1	6	153
33	Daichi Sato	1	6	153
36	Kouki Iwasaki	2	3	134
37	Akebono	1	2	127
38	Shota	1	2	120
39	Mao	1	3	97
40	Dash Chisako	1	1	95
40	Chihiro Hashimoto	1	1	95
40	Meiko Satomura	1	1	95
43	Koju Takeda	1	1	92
43	Kota Umeda	1	1	92
45	El Lindaman	1	2	90
46	Shinya Aoki	1	1	77
46	Brahman Kei	1	2	77
46	Brahman Shu	1	2	77
46	Gorgeous Matsuno	1	2	77
50	Ryota Nakatsu	1	0	70
50	Yuki Ishida	1	0	70
52	Cima	1	0	67
52	Duan Yingnan	1	0	67
54	Aja Kong	1	0	62
55	Yusuke Okada	1	1	59
55	Kotaro Suzuki	1	1	59
57	Mizuki Watase	1	1	57
58	Ken Ohka	1	1	56
59	Kota Ibushi	2	1	50
59	Kenny Omega	2	1	50
61	Naruki Doi	1	0	47
62	Harashima	1	0	46
62	Yasu Urano	1	0	46
64	Viento Levante	1	1	41
64	Yukio Naya	1	1	41
66	Diego	1	1	38
66	Kazuma Sumi	1	0	38
66	Yuni	1	0	38
69	Kenso	1	0	35
69	Shiori Asahi	1	0	35
71	Hoshitango	1	0	28
71	Gota Ihashi	1	0	28
71	Kensuke Sasaki	1	0	28
74	Minoru Fujita	1	0	11

== See also ==
- DDT Jiyugaoka Six-Person Tag Team Championship
- Sea of Japan Six-Person Tag Team Championship
- UWA World Trios Championship
