= Ilusion (wrestler) =

Japanese professional wrestler

- Ilusion in June 2026

Personal information
- Born: 10 December 2002 (age 23) Japan

Professional wrestling career
- Ring name: Ilusion
- Trained by: DDT Pro-Wrestling Dojo
- Debut: August 21, 2021

Ilusion (イルシオン, Irushion) is a Japanese masked professional wrestler. He is signed to DDT Pro-Wrestling, where he is a former six-time Ironman Heavymetalweight Champion.

== Professional wrestling career ==
=== DDT Pro-Wrestling (2021–present) ===
Ilusion made his professional wrestling debut in DDT Pro-Wrestling at Wrestle Peter Pan on 21 August 2021 alongside Yuji Okabayashi, Tamura, Mizuki Watase and Yuki Iino. The team was defeated by Disaster Box (Harashima and Naomi Yoshimura), Yusuke Okada, Raimu Imai and El Unicorn. At Never Mind 2021 on 26 December, he lost to Vent Vert Jack in the singles competition. During this time, he was part of the Damnation T.A and Schadenfreude International stables, and competed in several tag team championships. In 2022, Ilusion regularly competed in the promotion's flagship events, including Judgement 2022: DDT 25th Anniversary, where he was part of a six-man tag team match with Burning (Yusuke Okada and Yuya Koroku) against Tomomitsu Matsunaga, Toui Kojima and Yuki Ishida. Ilusion, Okada and Koroku were pitted against Kojima, Ishida and Takeshi Masada later that year at Wrestle Peter Pan 2022 in another six-man tag team event. In February 2023, he appeared at Into The Fight with Hideki Okatani and Ishida against Keigo Nakamura, Kojima and Kazuma Sumi. The following month, Ilusion and Munetatsu Nakamura defeated El Unicorn and Imai at Judgement 2023. His last appearance that year was at Mega Max Bump on 3 May, where he defeated Danshoku "Dandy" Dino in the singles competition.

In 2024, he appeared in multiple events, including Into The Fight, where he teamed with Yuki Iino and Yuni against Schadenfreude International (Antonio Honda, Chris Brookes and Masahiro Takanashi), ultimately losing the match. At Judgement 2024, Ilusion, Rukiya and To-y defeated Yuni, Yuya Koroku and Kazuma Sumi. In July, he appeared at Wrestle Peter Pan, where his team (Yuni and Koroku) was defeated by Keigo Nakamura, Ishida and Sumi. At Dramatic Infinity, he teamed up with Schadenfreude International stablemate Antonio Honda in a losing effort against Damnation T.A (Daisuke Sasaki, MJ Paul and Kanon). At God Bless DDT, he teamed up with Damnation T.A stablemates Daisuke Sasaki, MJ Paul and Kanon to defeat former unit colleagues Antonio Honda, Chris Brookes, Masahiro Takanashi and Takeshi Masada. During Ultimate Party that December, he and Demus lost to Yuni and Kazuma Sumi. At Judgement 2025, he teamed and MJ Paul defeated JJ Furno and Tomomitsu Matsunaga.

Ilusion has competed in various DDT signature events. He appeared at the inaugural edition of the D Generations Cup in 2023, where he competed in A Block of the competition and scored a total of two points after going against Yuya Koroku, Hideki Okatani and Kazuma Sumi. In the 2024 edition, which was held as a round-robin tournament, Ilusion defeated Yuni in the first rounds only to fall short to To-y in the semifinals. In 2025, he was the runner-up in the A Block with two points after competing against Takeshi Masada, Keigo Nakamura and Yuki Ishida.

=== Japanese independent circuit (2023–present) ===
Ilusion has competed in various Japanese independent promotions as a developmental talent sent by DDT since 2023. At TJPW/DDT/GCW, a cross-over event held on 19 April 2025, he teamed up with Daisuke Sasaki and Dark Sheik in a losing effort against Marcus Mathers, Shoko Nakajima and Super Crazy.

== Championships and accomplishments ==
- DDT Pro-Wrestling
  - KO-D Six-Man Tag Team Championship (2 times, current) – with Daisuke Sasaki and Hideki Okatani
  - KO-D 10-Man Tag Team Championship (1 time, current) – with Daisuke Sasaki, Demus 3:16, Hideki Okatani and MJ Paul
  - Ironman Heavymetalweight Championship (7 times)
  - World Ōmori Championship (1 time, current)
