= Yuya Koroku =

Japanese professional wrestler

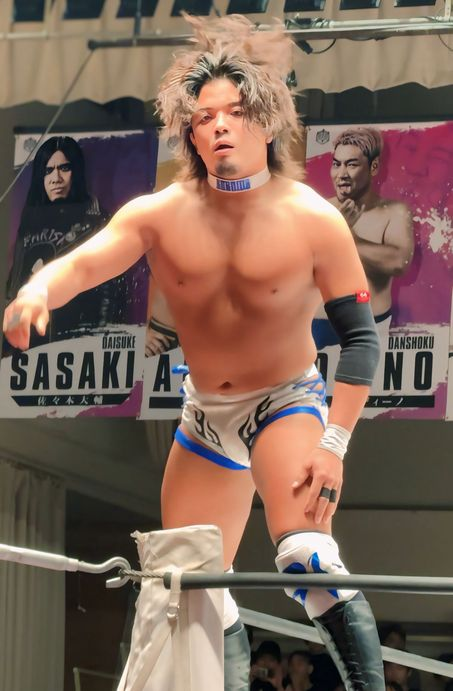
- Koroku in August 2024

Personal information
- Born: Yuya Takashika; 21 November 1997 (age 28) Chiba Prefecture

Professional wrestling career
- Ring name: Yuya Koroku
- Billed height: 170 cm (5 ft 7 in)
- Billed weight: 82 kg (181 lb)
- Trained by: Animal Hamaguchi; Jun Akiyama
- Debut: 2021

Yuya Takashika (高鹿佑也, Takashika Yuya) better known by his ring name Yuya Koroku is a Japanese professional wrestler signed to DDT Pro-Wrestling where he is a former KO-D 10-Man Tag Team Champion. He is also known for his work in various promotions from the Japanese independent scene.

== Professional wrestling career ==
=== DDT Pro-Wrestling (2021–present) ===
Takashika made his professional wrestling debut in DDT Pro-Wrestling at DDT April Fool 2021 on 4 April, where he fell short to Yusuke Okada in singles competition.

Takashika competed in various signature events of the promotion. In the D Generations Cup, he made his first appearance at the inaugural edition of 2023 where he topped the A block of the competition by defeating Hideki Okatani, Kazuma Sumi and Ilusion, only to fall short to Takeshi Masada in the finals held at Into The Fight 2023. In the 2024 edition which was held under a round-robin tournament, Takashika fell short to Rukiya in the first rounds. He scored his best results at the 2025 edition which he won by topping the B block where he competed against To-y, Yuni and Kazuma Sumi and then defeated Takeshi Masada in the finals.

In the King of DDT Tournament, Takashika made his first appearance at the 2025 edition where he fell short to Takeshi Masada in the first rounds.

Takashika competed in flagship events of the promotion. He made his pay-per-view debut at Wrestle Peter Pan 2021 on 21 July, he teamed up with Hideki Okatani in a losing effort against Yukio Naya and Keigo Nakamura. Never Mind 2021 on 26 December, where he teamed up with Jun Akiyama, Tetsuya Endo, Yusuke Okada to defeat The 37Kamiina (Mao, Shunma Katsumata, Toui Kojima and Yuki Ueno).

At Judgement 2022: DDT 25th Anniversary on 20 March, he teamed up with Yusuke Okada to defeat Tomomitsu Matsunaga, Toy Kojima and Yuki Ishida. At Wrestle Peter Pan 2022 on 20 August, he teamed up with his Burning stablemate Yusuke Okada and Ilusion to defeat Toui Kojima, Yuki Ishida and Takeshi Masada. At Never Mind 2022 on 29 December, he teamed up with Kazuma Sumi in a losing effort against Hideki Okatani and Toy Kojima.

At Sweet Dreams! 2023 on 29 January, he teamed up with Yuki Ishida and unsuccessfully competed in a four-way tag team match won by Damnation T.A (Kanon and MJ Paul) and also involving Disaster Box (Kazuki Hirata and Toru Owashi), Akito and Antonio Honda. At Judgement 2023 on 21 March, he teamed up with Yuki Ishida to defeat Toy Kojima and Kazuma Sumi. At Mega Max Bump 2023 on 3 May, he teamed up with Munetatsu Nakamura to defeat Kazuma Sumi and Toy Kojima. At Wrestle Peter Pan 2023 on 23 July, he teamed up with Burning stablemates Kotaro Suzuki and Yusuke Okada in a losing effort against Damnation T.A (Minoru Fujita, MJ Paul and Kanon), Naruki Doi and Disaster Box (Toru Owashi and Kazuki Hirata). At Ultimate Party 2023 on 12 November, Takashika teamed up with only Okada to defeat Damnnation T.A (Kanon and MJ Paul), Naruki Doi and Kazuma Sumi, Toy Kojima and Yuki Ishida and Yuni and Rukiya.

At Judgement 2024 on 17 March, he teamed up with Yuni and Kazuma Sumi in a losign effort against Ilusion, Rukiya and To-y. At Wrestle Peter Pan 2024 on 21 July, he teamed up with Yuni and Ilusion in a losing effort against Keigo Nakamura, Yuki Ishida and Kazuma Sumi. At Dramatic Infinity 2024 on 29 September, he teamed up with Tetsuya Endo and Soma Takao to defeat Kazuki Hirata, Toru Owashi and Yuki Ishida. At God Bless DDT 2024 on 20 October, he teamed up with Keigo Nakamura, Soma Takao and Yukio Naya in a losing effort against The37Kamiina (Mao, Shunma Katsumata, To-y and Yuki Ueno). At Ultimate Party 2024 on 28 December, Takashika teamed up with Tetsuya Endo and unsuccessfully fought The37Kamiina (Mao and To-y) for the vacant KO-D Tag Team Championship.

At Judgement 2025 on 20 March, he teamed up with Yukio Naya and Keigo Nakamura to defeat Makoto Oishi, Akito and Soma Takao.

=== Japanese independent circuit (2021–present) ===
Takashika often competes in various promotions of the Japanese independent scene as a developmental talent sent by DDT. At Keiji Muto Grand Final Pro-Wrestling "Last" Love, an event promoted by Pro Wrestling Noah on 21 February 2023, Takashika teamed up with Tetsuya Endo, Hideki Okatani and Takeshi Masada in a losing effort against The37Kamiina (Mao, Shunma Katsumata, Yuki Ueno and Toy Kojima).

He competed in the CyberFight Festival, making his first appearance at the 2021 edition of the event where he competed in a 15-person rumble rules match won by Antonio Honda and also involving notable opponents such as Yoshiaki Yatsu, Muhammad Yone, Saki Akai and Akitoshi Saito. At the 2022 edition, he teamed up with Toy Kojima in a losing effort against Kinya Okada and Kai Fujimura.

== Championships and accomplishments ==
- DDT Pro-Wrestling
  - KO-D Tag Team Championship (1 time, current) – with Takeshi Masada
  - KO-D 6-Man Tag Team Championship (1 time) – with Takeshi Masada and Daichi Sato
  - KO-D 10-Man Tag Team Championship (1 time) – with Keigo Nakamura, To-y, Yuki Ishida and Kazuma Sumi
  - Ironman Heavymetalweight Championship (5 times)
  - D Generations Cup (2025)
