= Yuni (wrestler) =

Japanese professional wrestler

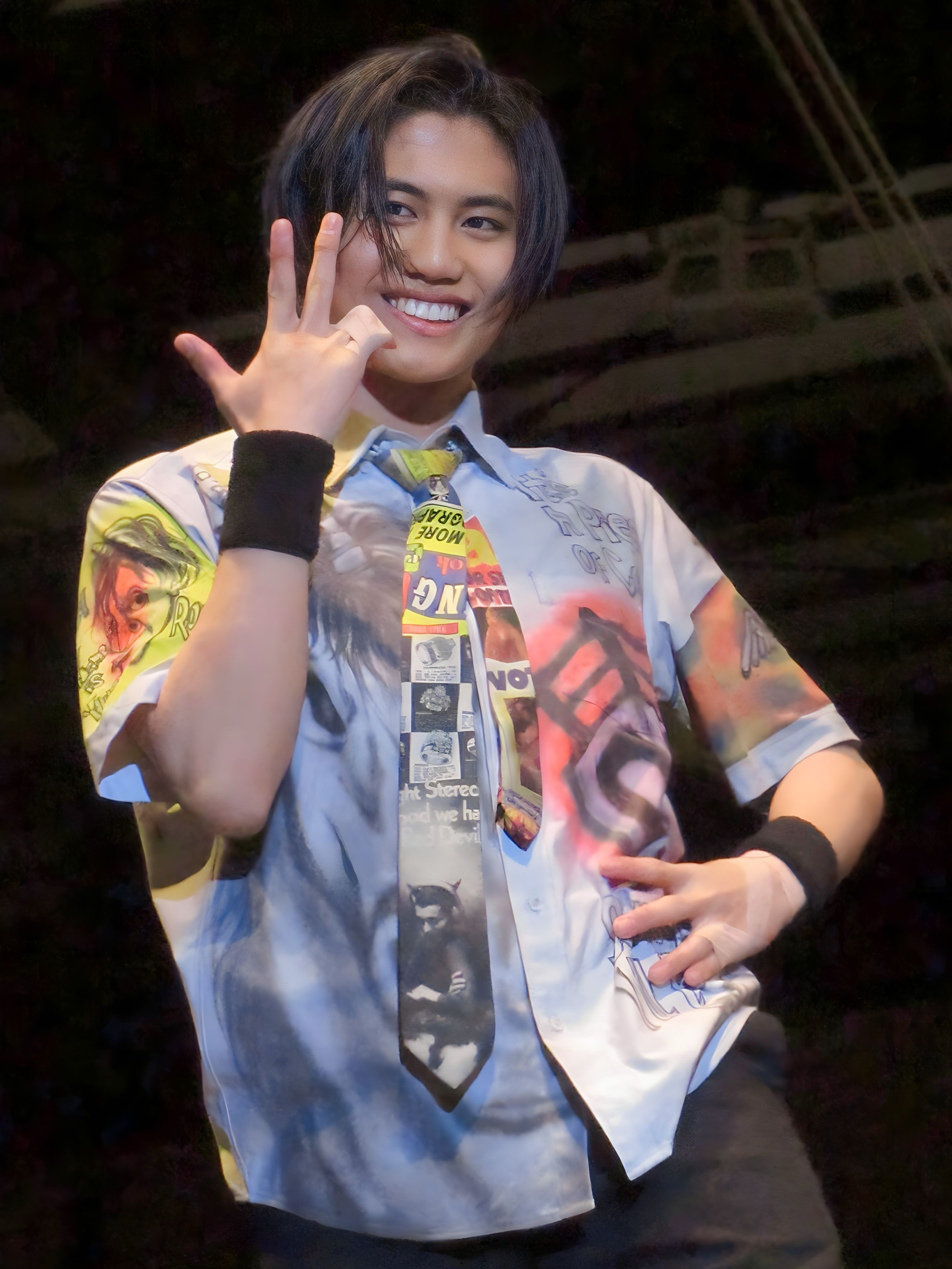
- Yuni in January 2024

Personal information
- Born: February 8, 2008 (age 18) Osaka, Japan

Professional wrestling career
- Ring names: Yuni; El Unicorn
- Billed height: 160 cm (5 ft 3 in)
- Billed weight: 53 kg (117 lb)
- Trained by: Makoto Oishi
- Debut: 2016

Yuni (夢虹, Yuni) is a Japanese professional wrestler working for the Japanese promotion DDT Pro-Wrestling where he is a former one time KO-D 6-Man Tag Team Champions. He is known for being one of the youngest debuting male wrestlers of all time, as well as one of the youngest recognized champions in professional wrestling.

== Professional wrestling career ==
=== As Yuni (2016–2020) ===
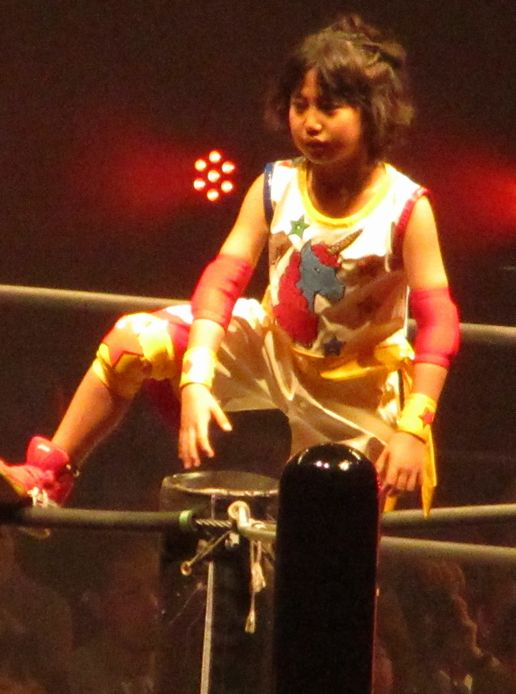
Yuni, aged 8, in 2016.

Yuni (written in hiragana as ゆに) made his professional wrestling debut at the early age of 8, in DDT Pro-Wrestling (DDT), at Osaka Octopus 2016 on December 4, where he teamed up with Shigehiro Irie and Yasu Urano, picking up a victory over New Wrestling Aidoru (Makoto Oishi, Mao and Shunma Katsumata). Over his debut, Yuni was compared to other early-starting wrestlers such as Ram Kaicho and Riho who also debuted under the age of ten.

On March 20, 2017, at Judgement, Yuni teamed up with Jaguar Yokota, Keisuke Ishii and Masahiro Takanashi to defeat Toru Owashi, Kazuki Hirata, Antonio Honda and Ladybeard. On August 5, at Beer Garden Fight, he fought Daiki Shimomura to a time limit draw in his first singles bout, a dark match with a 3-minute time limit. Yuni is a former multiple-time Ironman Heavymetalweight Champion, having won the title for the first time at Who's Gonna Top?, on September 24, where he defeated his trainer Makoto Oishi for the belt, making him one of the youngest recognized champions in the Japanese independent scene.

At Judgement 2019: DDT 22nd Anniversary on February 17, he participated in a Rumble rules match for the Ironman Heavymetalweight Championship won by Saki Akai and also involving other notable opponents, both male and female such as El Lindaman, Mina Shirakawa, Gorgeous Matsuno, Asuka, Gota Ihashi, Hoshitango and Yuka Sakazaki.

On January 13, 2020, at Wrestle Tororokobu!, Yuni teamed with Tetsuya Endo in a losing effort to Disaster Box (Toru Owashi and Yuki Ueno), dropping the Ironman Heavymetalweight Championship to Ueno in the process. He then went on a hiatus.

=== As El Unicorn (2021–2023) ===
In July 2021, DDT unveiled their DDTeeeen!! brand, focused on younger wrestlers recruited through a talent scouting program. Yuni wrestled for the brand as the masked El Unicorn, with his real identity being kept secret. His first appearance as El Unicorn was on August 21, at Wrestle Peter Pan 2021, where he teamed with Harashima, Naomi Yoshimura, Raimu Imai and Yusuke Okada, and defeated the team of Ilusion, Mizuki Watase, Tamura, Yuji Okabayashi and Yuki Iino.

On March 21, 2023, in the pre-show of Judgement, El Unicorn had his DDTeeeen!! graduation match in which he teamed with Raimu Imai in a losing effort to Ilusion and Munetatsu Nakamura. After the match, he unmasked. The next day, during a press conference, he announced he would revert to his real name Yuni, written as 夢虹 (lit. 'dream rainbow').

=== As Yuni (2023–present) ===
On April 9, 2023, at April Fool 2023, Yuni re-debuted in-ring by facing Yuki Ueno in a losing effort.

== Championships and accomplishments ==
- DDT Pro-Wrestling
  - KO-D 6-Man Tag Team Championship (1 time) – with Shunma Katsumata and Kazuma Sumi
  - Ironman Heavymetalweight Championship (13 times)
