= Kazuma Sumi =

Japanese professional wrestler

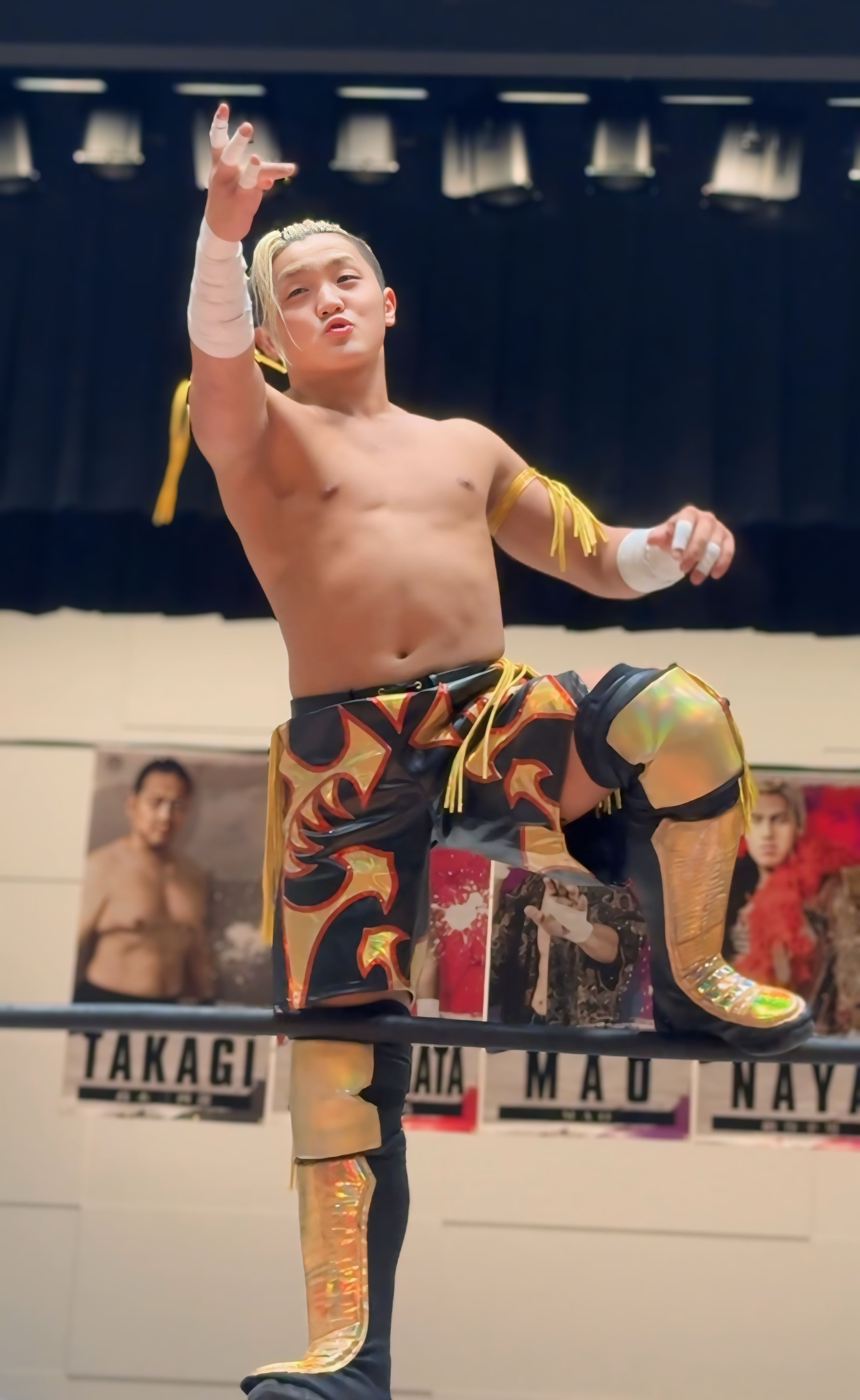
- Sumi in June 2024

Personal information
- Born: 27 March 2003 (age 23) Tsu, Japan

Professional wrestling career
- Ring name: Kazuma Sumi
- Billed height: 163 cm (5 ft 4 in)
- Billed weight: 65 kg (143 lb)
- Debut: 2022

Kazuma Sumi (須見 和馬, Sumi Kazuma) is a Japanese professional wrestler. He is signed to DDT Pro-Wrestling (DDT), where he is the former one-time DDT Universal Champion and a former KO-D 6-Man Tag Team Champion and KO-D 10-Man Tag Team Champion. He is also makes appearances various promotions from the Japanese independent scene.

== Professional wrestling career ==
=== DDT Pro-Wrestling (2022–present) ===
Sumi made his professional wrestling debut in DDT Pro-Wrestling at DDT God Bless DDT 2022 on 23 October, where he fell short to Kazuki Hirata in singles competition.

Sumi competed in various events of the promotion. In the D Generations Cup, he made his first appearance at the inaugural edition of the tournament in 2023, where he placed himself in the A block, failing to score any points after going against Yuya Koroku, Hideki Okatani and Ilusion. At the 2024 edition, he fell short of Munetatsu Nakamura in the first round. In the 2025 edition, he placed himself in the B block, where he scored a total of three points after competing against Yuya Koroku, To-y and Yuni.

Sumi competed in the promotion's flagship events. At Never Mind 2022 on 29 December, he teamed up with Yuya Koroku in a losing effort against Hideki Okatani and Toy Kojima. At Sweet Dreams! 2023 on 29 January, he fell short to Okatani in singles competition. At Into The Fight 2023 on 26 February, he teamed up with Keigo Nakamura and To-y to defeat Hideki Okatani, Yuki Ishida and Ilusion. At Judgement 2023 on 21 March, he teamed up with Kojima in a losing effort against Yuya Koroku and Yuki Ishida. At Mega Max Bump 2023 on 3 May, he and Kojima fell short to Koroku and Munetatsu Nakamura. At Wrestle Peter Pan 2023 on 23 July, he fell short to Takeshi Masada. At Ultimate Party 2023 on 12 November, Sumi teamed up with Naruki Doi and competed in a Rumble rules tag team battle royal won by Burning (Yusuke Okada and Yuya Koroku) and also involving Damnation T.A (Kanon and MJ Paul), Toy Kojima and Yuki Ishida, and Yuni and Rukiya.

At Sweet Dreams! 2024 on 28 January, Sumi teamed up with Harashima, Antonio Honda, Takeshi Masada and Tomoya to defeat Sanshiro Takagi, Toru Owashi, Akito, Shinichiro Kawamatsu and Yuni. At Judgement 2024 on 17 March, he teamed up with Yuni and Yuya Koroku in a losing effort against Ilusion, Rukiya and To-y. At Wrestle Peter Pan 2024 on 21 July, he teamed up with Keigo Nakamura and Yuki Ishida to defeat Yuni, Yuya Koroku and Ilusion. At Dramatic Infinity 2024 on 29 September, Sumi unsuccessfully challenged Akito, Yuni and reigning champion Shunma Katsumata for the DDT Extreme Championship. At God Bless DDT 2024 on 20 October, he teamed up with Yuni to defeat Kazuki Hirata and Super Sasadango Machine. At Ultimate Party 2024 on 28 December, Sumi teamed up with Yuni to defeat Demus and Ilusion.

At Judgement 2025 on 20 March, Sumi teamed up with his "NωA Jr." stablemates Shunma Katsumata and Yuni and defeated Harimau (Kazusada Higuchi, Ryota Nakatsu and Yuki Ishida) to win the vacant KO-D 6-Man Tag Team Championship.

==== Japanese independent circuit (2023–present) ====
Sumi often competes in other promotions as a developmental talent sent by DDT. At All Star Junior Festival 2023 on 1 March, he teamed up with Yoh and Soma Watanabe to defeat Fuminori Abe, Ryo Hoshino and Akira Jumonji. On the second night of Destruction in Ryogoku, an event promoted by New Japan Pro Wrestling on 9 October 2023, Sumi teamed up with Takahiro Katori, Takeshi Masada, Kengo, and Jun Masaoka in a losing effort against Chaos (Yoshi-Hashi, Toru Yano and Yoh), Tiger Mask and Ryusuke Taguchi.

== Championships and accomplishments ==
- DDT Pro-Wrestling
  - DDT Universal Championship (1 time)
  - KO-D 6-Man Tag Team Championship (1 time) – Shunma Katsumata and Yuni
  - KO-D 10-Man Tag Team Championship (1 time) – with Keigo Nakamura, To-y, Yuki Ishida and Yuya Koroku
  - Ironman Heavymetalweight Championship (7 times)
  - D Generations Cup (2026)
- Pro Wrestling Illustrated
  - Ranked No. 280 of the top singles wrestlers in the PWI 500 in 2026
