= Yuki Ishida (wrestler) =

Japanese professional wrestler (born 1999)

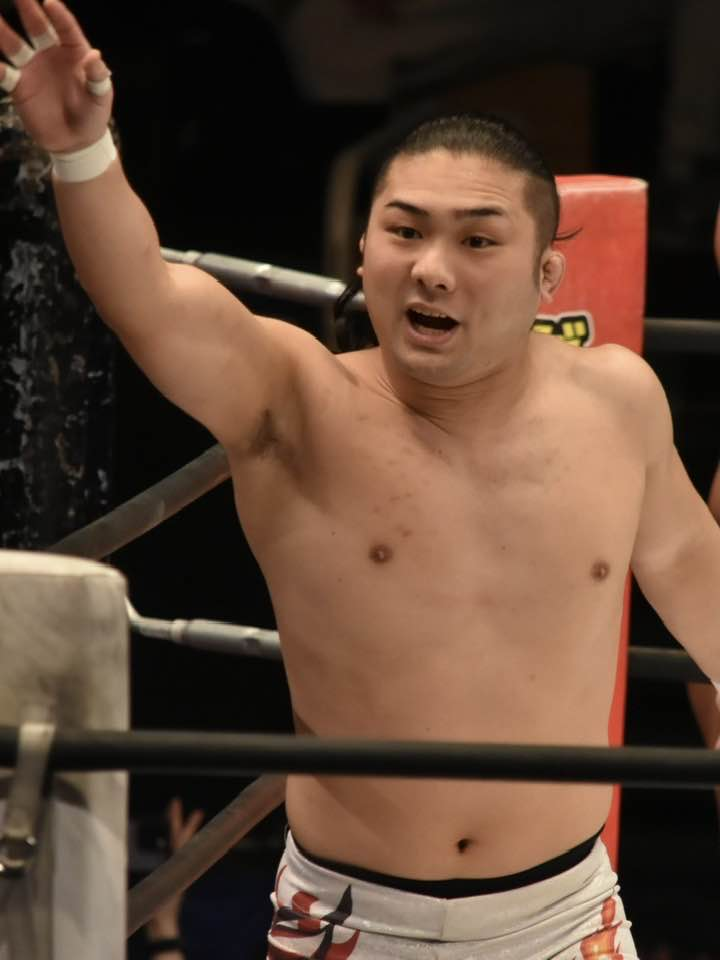
- Ishida in March 2023

Personal information
- Born: 21 January 1999 (age 27) Yatsushiro, Kumamoto, Japan

Professional wrestling career
- Ring name: Yuki Ishida
- Billed height: 168 cm (5 ft 6 in)
- Billed weight: 86 kg (190 lb)
- Trained by: Jun Akiyama
- Debut: September 26, 2021

Yuki Ishida (石田 有輝, Ishida Yūki; born January 21, 1999) is a Japanese professional wrestler, working for DDT Pro-Wrestling.

== Early life and sumo background ==
Ishida has a background as a sumo wrestler, having competed at amateur level at Tottori Jōhoku High School, a senior high school known for its sports program. There, he was a senior to future professional sumo wrestlers Takerufuji and Rōga.

== Professional wrestling career ==
Ishida made his first appearance for DDT Pro-Wrestling on September 26, 2021, at Who's Gonna Top? 2021, in a pre-show exhibition bout against Yuya Koroku that went to a time-limit draw. His official debut was on October 12, at Get Alive 2021 where he faced Kazusada Higuchi in a losing effort.

On August 24, 2022, at a free event in Shinjuku Face, he had his first win where he teamed up with Higuchi, defeating The37Kamiina (Konosuke Takeshita and Toi Kojima). Ishida then offered to join the stable Harimau, which was accepted. On May 14, 2023, at Only We × DDT Special: Yuji Hino's Debut 20th Anniversary, Ishida teamed up with Higuchi and Ryota Nakatsu where they defeated Shinya Aoki, Yuki Ueno and Super Sasadango Machine to win the KO-D 6-Man Tag Team Championship, which also marked Ishida's first championship. They lost the titles to Eruption (Yukio Sakaguchi, Saki Akai and Hideki Okatani) on July 23, at Wrestle Peter Pan 2023.

== Championships and accomplishments ==
- DDT Pro Wrestling
  - KO-D 6-Man Tag Team Championship (1 time) – with Kazusada Higuchi and Ryota Nakatsu
  - KO-D 10-Man Tag Team Championship (1 time) – with Keigo Nakamura, Kazuma Sumi, To-y and Yuya Koroku
  - Ironman Heavymetalweight Championship (2 times)
