= Keigo Nakamura =

Japanese professional wrestler

- Nakamura in June 2026 as Viento Levante

Personal information
- Born: July 10, 1999 (age 27) Morioka, Japan

Professional wrestling career
- Ring names: Darkunesu K; Keigo Nakamura; Viento Levante; Viento Maligno
- Billed height: 168 cm (5 ft 6 in)
- Billed weight: 72 kg (159 lb)
- Debut: 2019

Keigo Nakamura (Japanese: 中村圭吾, Hepburn: Nakamura Keigo) (born July 10, 1999) is a Japanese professional wrestler. He is signed to DDT Pro Wrestling, where performs as the masked character Viento Levante (ビエント・レバンテ, Biento Rebante) and is a member of Strange Love Connection.

== Professional wrestling career ==
=== Independent circuit (2019–present) ===
Nakamura is known to have had sporadic appearances for various promotions. At BJW Last Buntai, an event promoted by Big Japan Pro Wrestling on August 30, 2020, he teamed up with Nautilus (Naomi Yoshimura and Yuki Ueno) to pick up a victory over Kosuke Sato, Masaki Morihiro and Takuho Kato.

==== DDT Pro-Wrestling (2019–present) ====
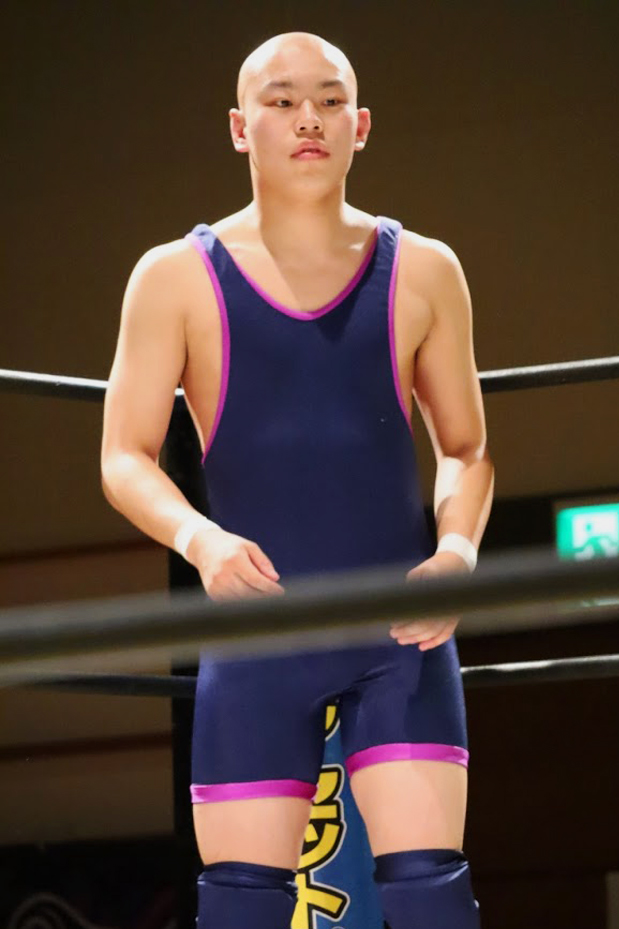
Nakamura in July 2020

Nakamura made his professional wrestling debut in DDT Pro-Wrestling in a series of exhibition matches, first of them taking place at DDT Road To Wrestle Peter Pan 2019 on June 16 where he fell short to Yuki Ueno. At DDT UNIVERSE LIVE! One Chan Saturday on March 7, 2020, he competed in a 14-man delayed battle royal also involving Harashima, Konosuke Takeshita, Masahiro Takanashi, Mizuki Watase, Yuki Iino and others. At DDT One Bout Show from May 23, 2020, Nakamura unsuccessfully challenged Shinya Aoki for the DDT Extreme Championship.

Nakamura is known for working in various of the promotion's signature events. One of them is DDT Ultimate Party, making his first appearance at Ultimate Party 2019 on November 3 where he teamed up with Tomomitsu Matsunaga and Mizuki Watase in a losing effort to Daichi Kazato, Masato Kamino and Shuhei Washida as a result of a six-man tag team match. One year later at Ultimate Party 2020 from November 3 he fell short to Hideki Okatani.

As for the DDT Peter Pan branch of events, Nakamura made his first appearance at Wrestle Peter Pan 2019 from July 15 where he fell short to Kota Umeda in a pre-show match. One year later on the first night of the Wrestle Peter Pan 2020 from June 6, he teamed up with Hideki Okatani in a losing effort to Damnation (Soma Takao and Mad Paulie). At Wrestle Peter Pan 2021 on August 21, Nakamura teamed up with Yukio Naya to defeat Hideki Okatani and Yuya Koroku.

Another branch of events in which he made appearances is DDT Judgement. At Judgement 2020: DDT 23rd Anniversary on March 20, he teamed up with Naomi Yoshimura defeating Shunma Katsumata and Hideki Okatani. At Judgement 2021: DDT 24th Anniversary on March 28, he teamed up with Toru Owashi and Akito in a losing effort to Danshoku Dino, Makoto Oishi and Saki Akai.

== Championships and accomplishments ==
- DDT Pro-Wrestling

- Ironman Heavymetalweight Championship (2 times)
- KO-D 8-Man/10-Man Tag Team Championship (2 times) – with Yoshiaki Yatsu, Akito and Hiroshi Yamato (1), and To-y, Yuki Ishida, Kazuma Sumi and Yuya Koroku (1)
- KO-D 6-Man Tag Team Championship (1 time) – with Kanon and Yukio Naya

- Japan Indie Awards

- Newcomer Award (2019)
