= List of DDT Pro-Wrestling personnel =

DDT Pro-Wrestling is a Japanese professional wrestling promotion based in Shinjuku, Tokyo, and part of the CyberFight umbrella promotion. DDT personnel consists of professional wrestlers, ring announcers, referees, trainers, and various other positions.

== Background ==
DDT contracts typically range from developmental deals for dojo trainees to full-time contracts. The promotion also features regulars working as freelancers. Personnel appear on untelevised live events and on televised events which are aired on various broadcasters or on CyberFight's own international streaming service, Wrestle Universe.

Personnel is organized below by their role in DDT Pro-Wrestling. The performer's ring name is listed on the left and their real name is on the right. This list also acknowledges which stable (referred to by DDT as "units") a wrestler is a part of – this is listed as it is considered by DDT to be a vital part of their product. "(L)" also indicates the leader of the group when one is designated.

As of June 2026, there are seven central units in DDT:

- Main Unit (Note: Simply referred to as "DDT")
- Damnation T.A.
- Fantômes Dramatic
- NωA Jr. (Note: New Wrestling Aidoru Junior)
- Paleyouth
- Strange Love Connection
- The37Kamiina (Note: Japanese: The37KAMIINA(サウナカミーナ), Hepburn: Sauna Kamīna)

As DDT has working relationships with its CyberFight sister promotions as well as All Elite Wrestling and numerous other Japanese promotions, wrestlers from these promotions may appear on DDT events and have their home promotions or stables from their home promotions listed as their affiliated unit.

== Personnel ==
=== Wrestlers ===
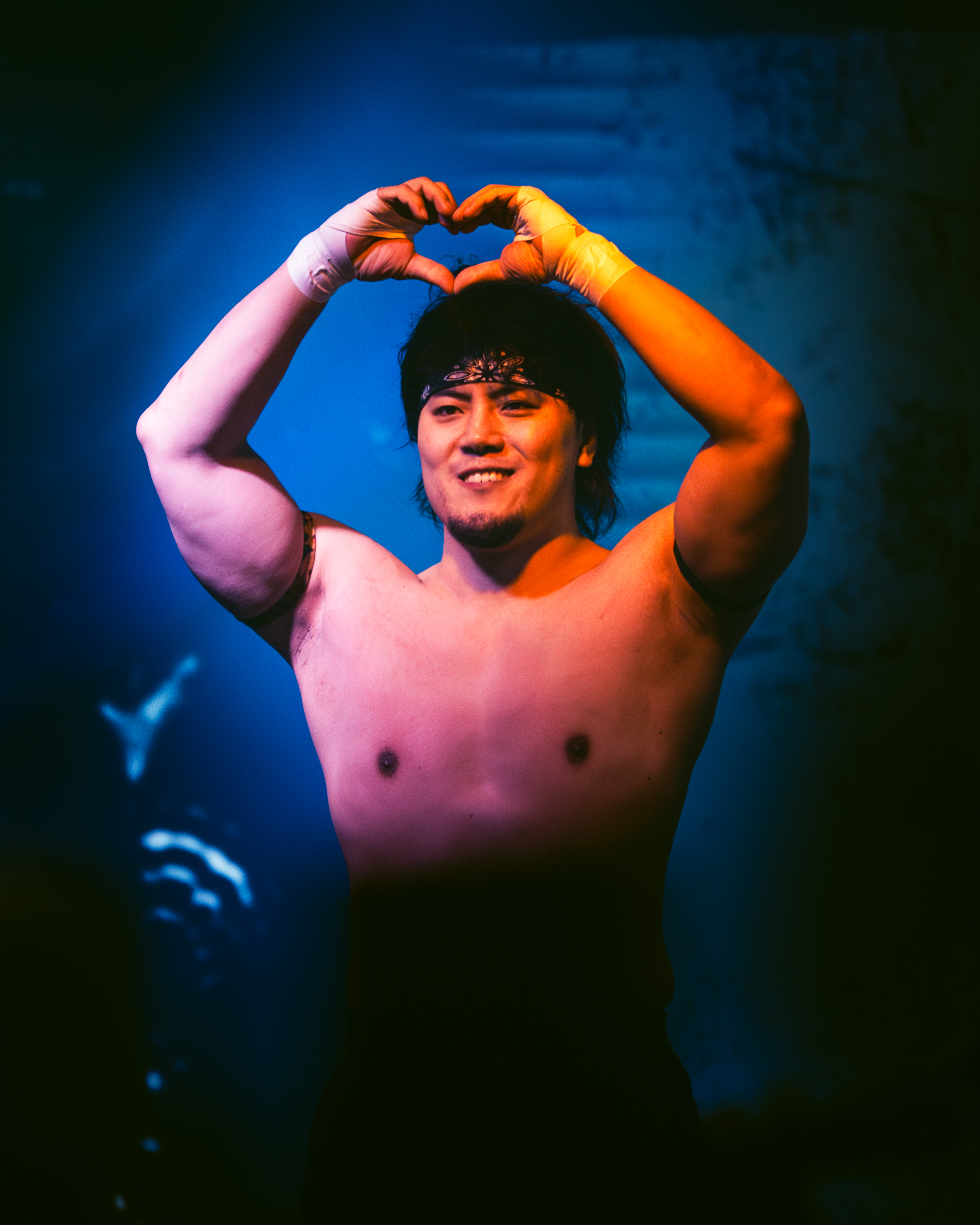
Mao

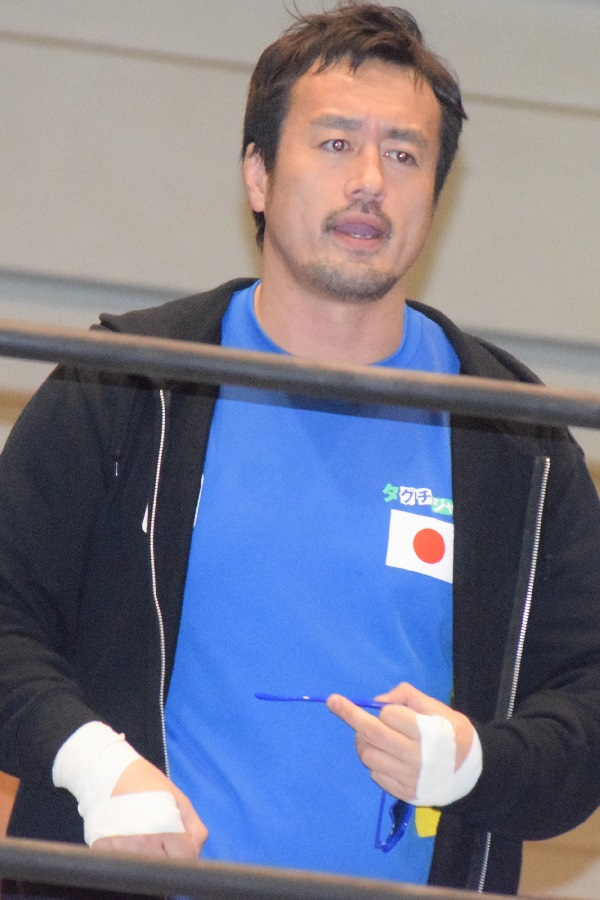
Ryusuke Taguchi

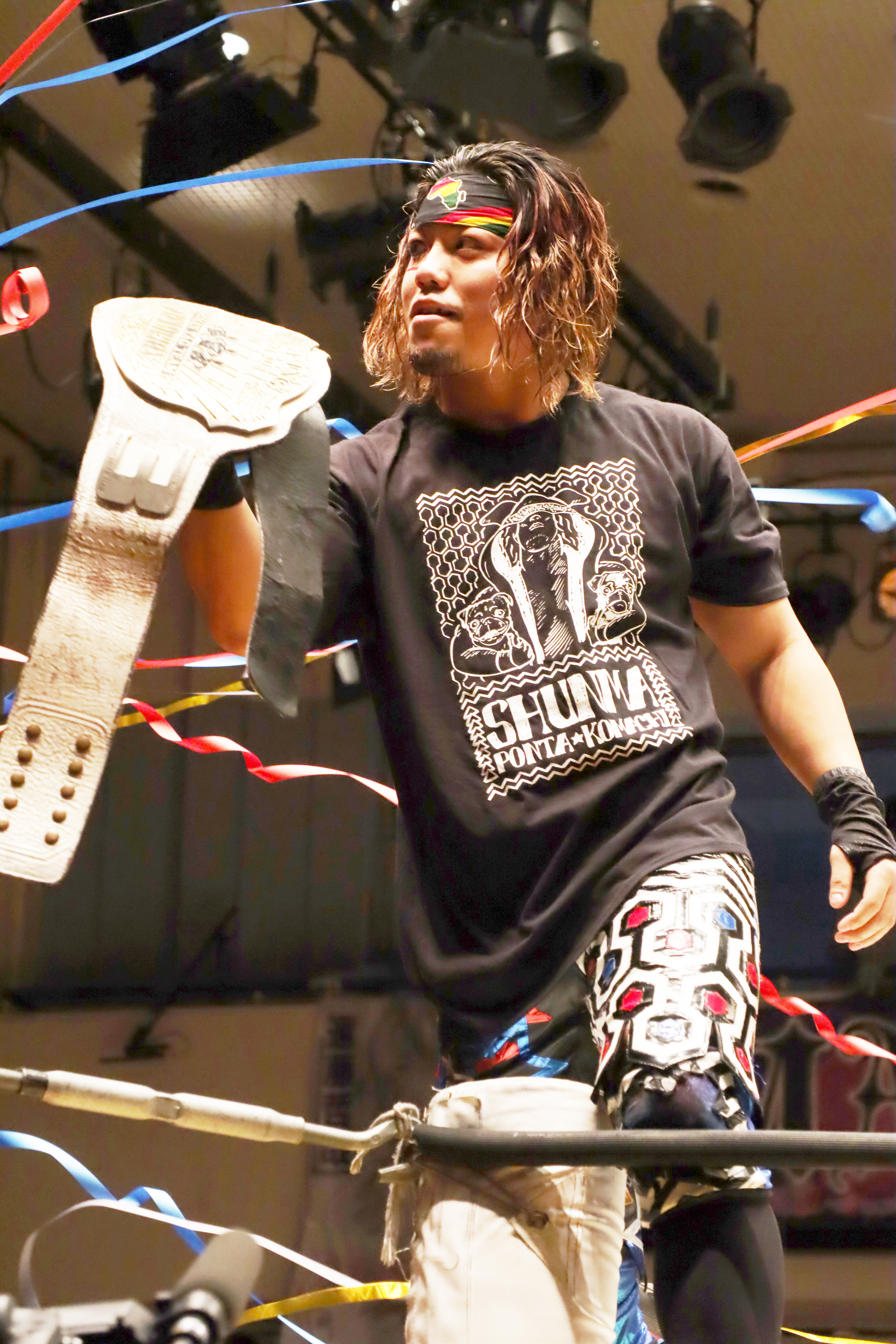
Shunma Katsumata

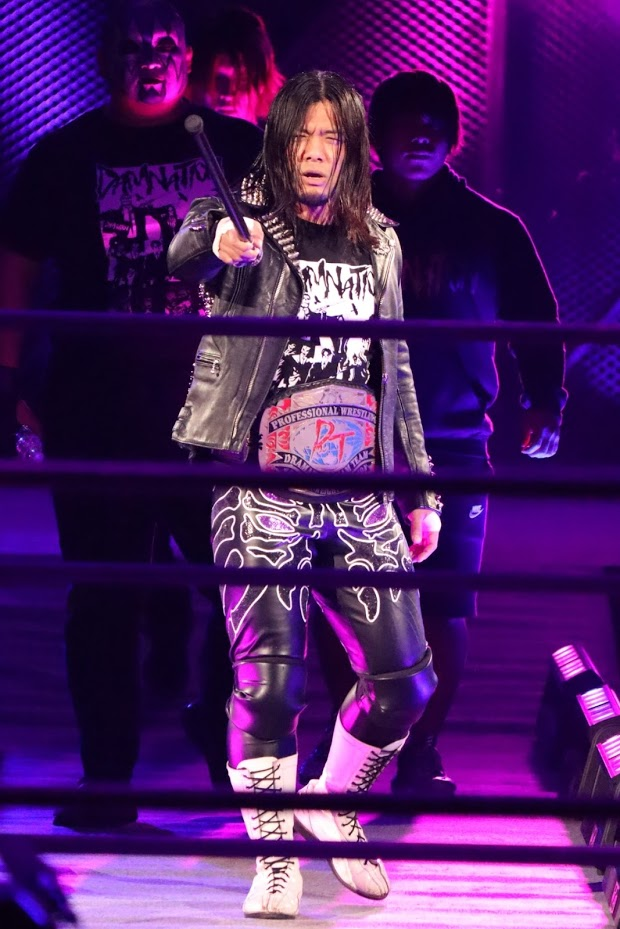
Daisuke Sasaki

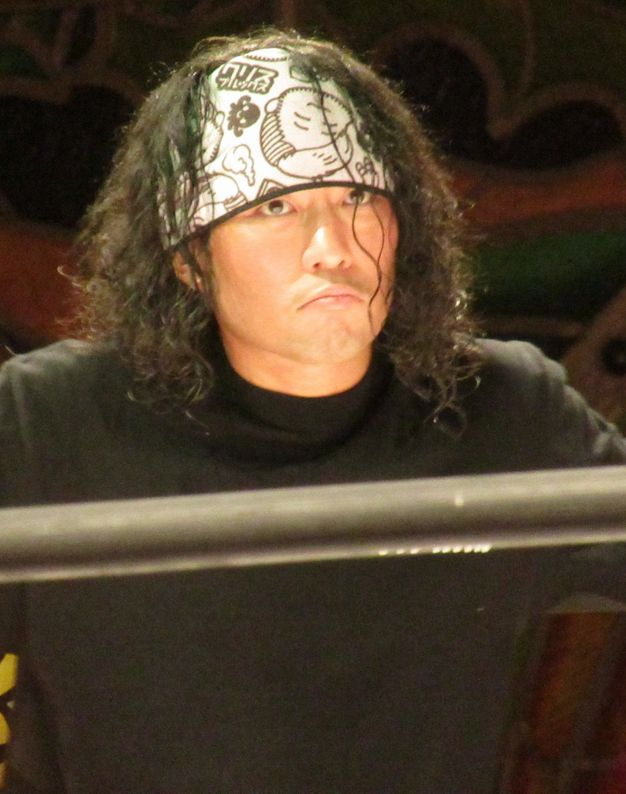
Masa Takanashi

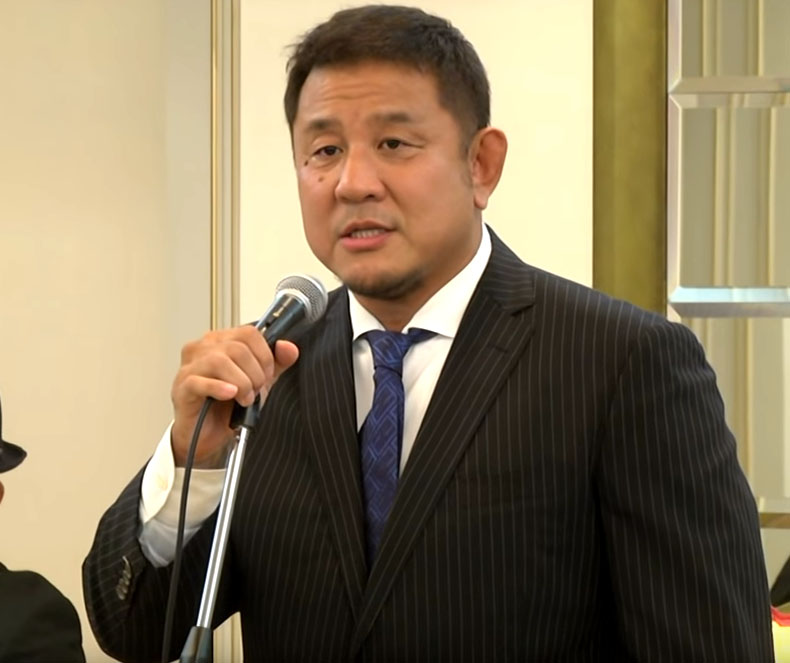
Yuji Nagata

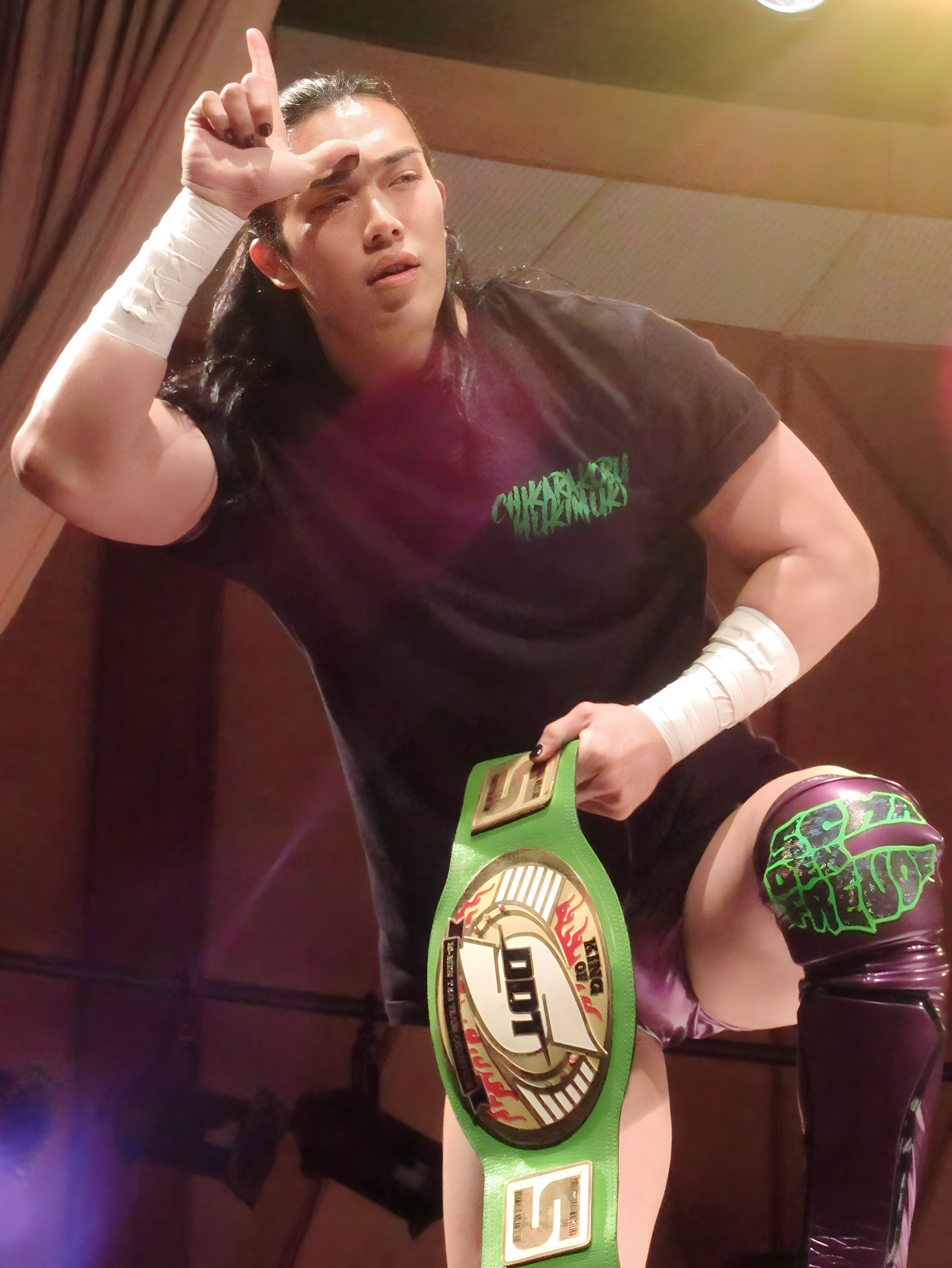
Takeshi Masada

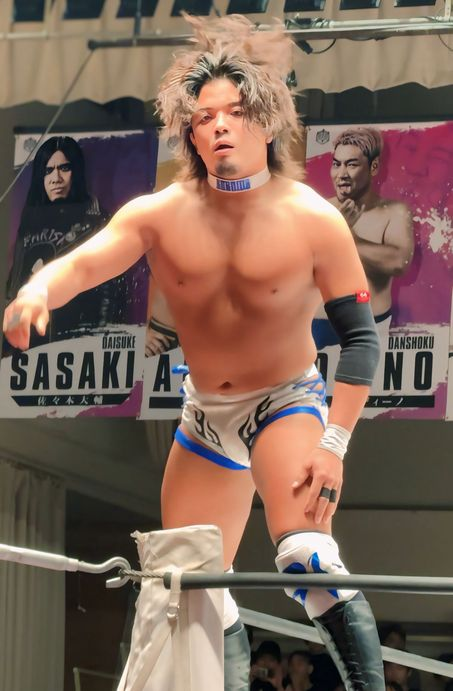
Yuya Koroku

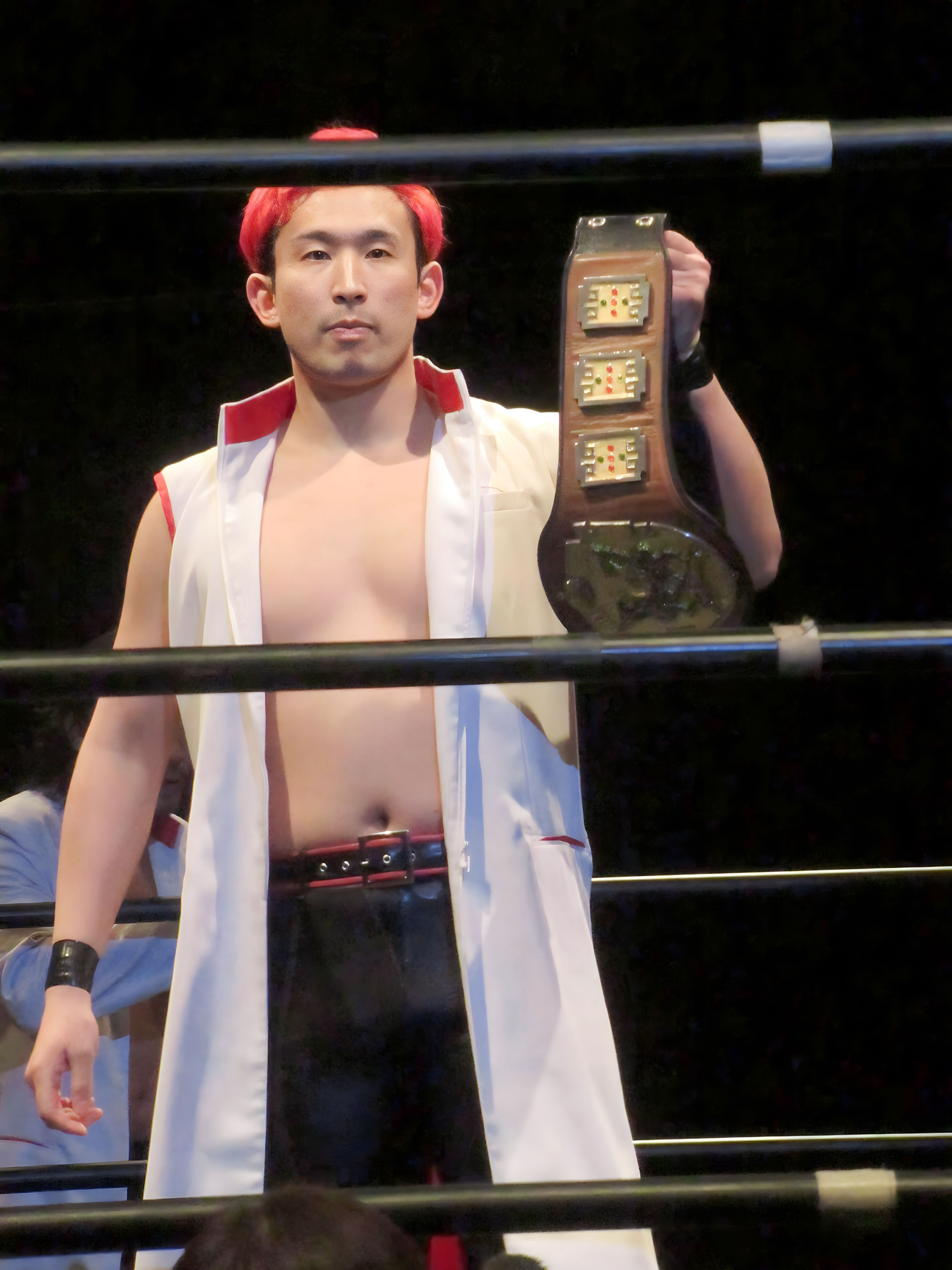
Hideki Okatani

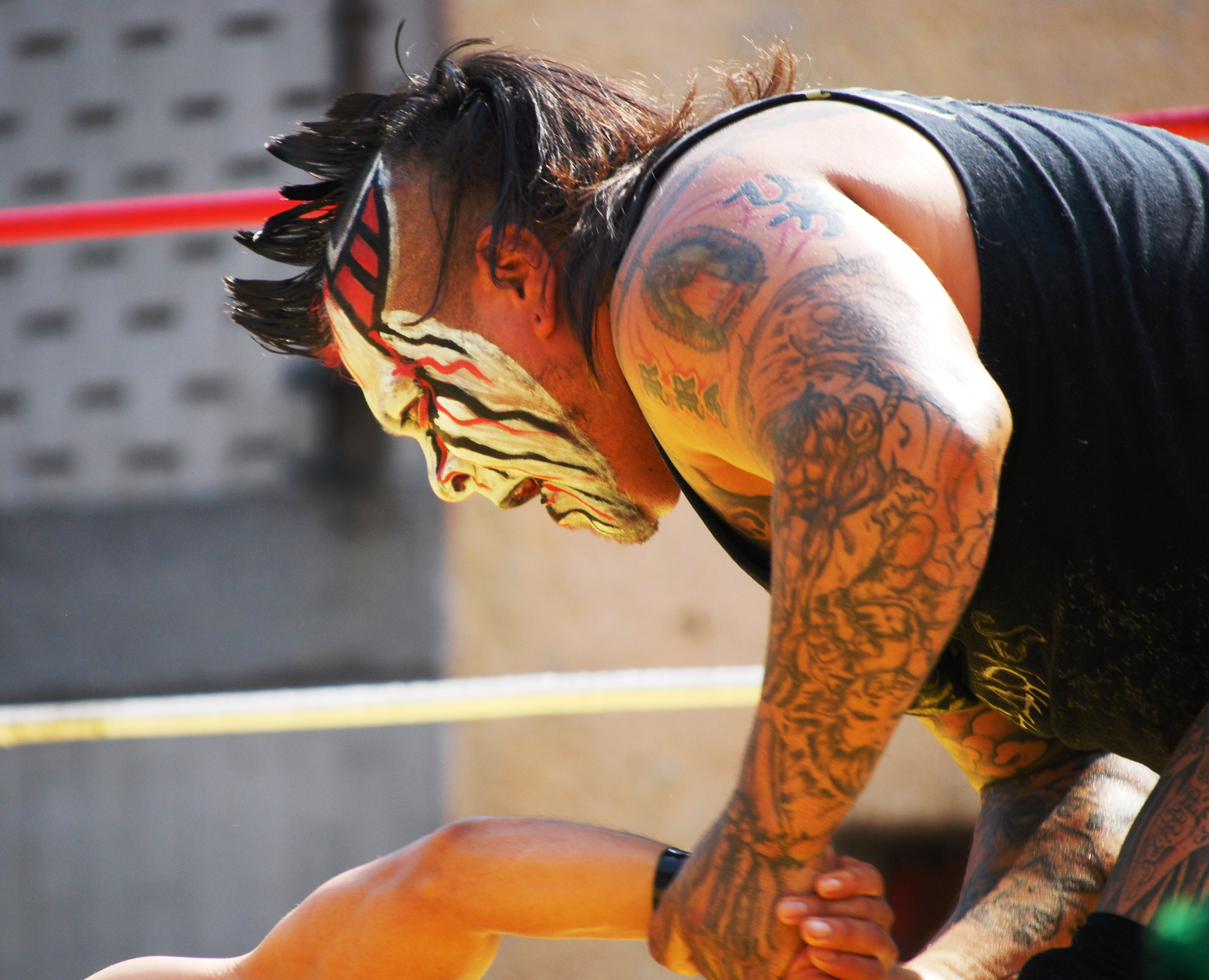
Demus

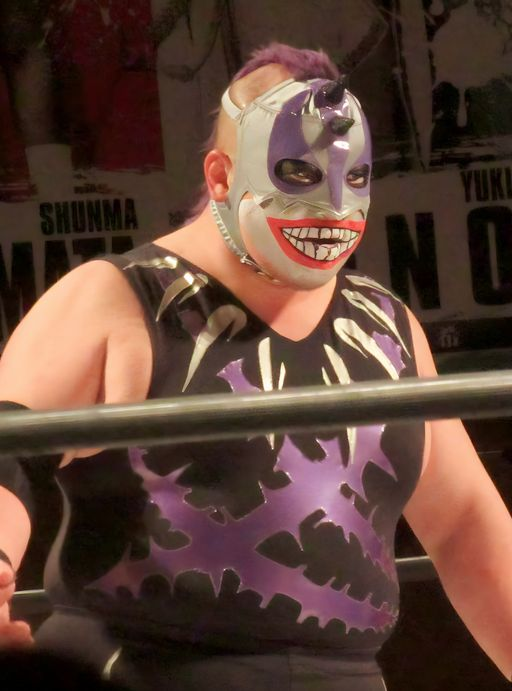
MJ Paul

Ring name	Real name	Unit	Notes
Akito	Akito Nishigaki	Main Unit	Company Director of CyberFight
Antonio Honda	Soichiro Honda	Fantômes Dramatic	Freelancer
Bunbun	N/A	Paleyouth	A puppet
Chris Brookes	Unknown	Fantômes Dramatic (L)	Freelancer
Daichi Sato	Daichi Satoh	paleyouth	
Daisuke Sasaki	Daisuke Sasaki	Damnation T.A. (L)	O-40 Champion; KO-D 6-Man Tag Team Champion; KO-D 10-Man Tag Team Champion
Danshoku Dino	Aki Miyashita	Main Unit	
Demus	José Luis Florencio Ramos	Damnation T.A.	Freelancer; KO-D 10-Man Tag Team Champion
Gorgeous Matsuno	Yukihide Matsuno	Main Unit	Part-timer
Gota Ihashi	Isao Ihashi	Main Unit	
Haku	Nigihayami Kohakunushi	Main Unit	Danshoku Dino's Shiba Inu dog
Harashima	Undisclosed	Fantômes Dramatic	
Hideki Okatani	Hideki Okatani	Damnation T.A.	KO-D 6-Man Tag Team Champion; KO-D 10-Man Tag Team Champion
Hinata Kasai	Hinata Kasai	Fantômes Dramatic	
Hoshitango	Imachi Marcelo Salomón	Main Unit	Part-timer
Ilusion	Undisclosed	Damnation T.A.	KO-D 6-Man Tag Team Champion; KO-D 10-Man Tag Team Champion
Jun Akiyama	Jun Akiyama	Main Unit	
Junta Miyawaki	Junta Miyawaki	Main Unit	On excursion from Pro Wrestling Noah
Kaisei Takechi	Kaisei Takechi	Main Unit	Affiliated with LDH Japan
Kanon	Undisclosed	Strange Love Connection	
Kazuki Hirata	Kazuki Hirata	Main Unit	Interim World Ōmori Champion
Kazuma Sumi	Kazuma Sumi	NωA Jr.	
Kimihiro	Unknown	Strange Love Connection	Manager and MC
Konosuke Takeshita	Konosuke Takeshita	Main Unit	Signed to All Elite Wrestling and New Japan Pro-Wrestling
Kudo	Atsushi Kudo	Main Unit	Inactive
Makoto Oishi	Undisclosed	Main Unit	
Mao	Mao Inoue	Strange Love Connection	
Masahiro Takanashi	Masahiro Takanashi	Main Unit	World Ōmori Champion; Inactive; spinal injury
Masami Inahata	Masami Inahata	Main Unit	
Michael Nakazawa	Masatsugu Nakazawa	Main Unit	Signed to All Elite Wrestling
MJ Paul	Masato Shibata	Damnation T.A.	KO-D 10-Man Tag Team Champion
Naomi Yoshimura	Naomi Yoshimura	Main Unit	
Pokotan	N/A	Main Unit	A yuru-chara mascot Part-timer
Rukiya	Rukiya Ikeda	Main Unit	
Ryusuke Taguchi	Ryusuke Taguchi	Main Unit	Signed to New Japan Pro Wrestling; DDT Universal Champion
Sanshiro Takagi	Tadashi Takagi	Main Unit	Executive Vice President of CyberFight
Shinichiro Kawamatsu	Shinichiro Kawamatsu	Main Unit	Part-timer
Shinya Aoki	Shinya Aoki	Main Unit	Freelancer affiliated with Paraestra Tokyo
Shunma Katsumata	Shunma Katsumata	The37Kamiina; NωA Jr.	DDT Extreme Champion
Soma Takao	Unknown	Main Unit	Inactive; injury
Super Sasadango Machine	Yoshihiro Sakai	Main Unit	Affiliate signed to Shochiku Geino; Part-timer
Takeshi Masada	Takeshi Masada	paleyouth	KO-D Tag Team Champion
Tetsuya Endo	Tetsuya Endo	White Raven Sqwad	On excursion in Pro Wrestling Noah
To-y	Toui Kojima	The37Kamiina	
Tomomitsu Matsunaga	Tomomitsu Matsunaga	Main Unit	Occasional referee
Toru Owashi	Toru Itoh	Main Unit	Freelancer
Viento Levante	Keigo Nakamura	Strange Love Connection	
Yoshihiko	N/A	Main Unit	A rag doll
Yuji Nagata	Yuji Nagata	Main Unit	Signed to New Japan Pro Wrestling; Ironman Heavymetalweight Champion
Yuki Iino	Yuki Iino	Strange Love Connection	
Yuki Ishida	Yuki Ishida	Main Unit	
Yuki Ueno	Yuki Ueno	The37Kamiina	
Yukio Naya	Yukio Naya	Strange Love Connection	
Yuni	Yuni Shimazoe	NωA Jr.	
Yuya Koroku	Yuya Koroku	paleyouth	KO-D Tag Team Champion
Yuzuki	Yuzuki Hoshimoto	Strange Love Connection	Valet

== Staff ==
Name	Role
Daisuke Kiso	Referee
Hisaya Imabayashi	General Manager
Inoue Mic	Ring Announcer
Kazunori Kosuge	Ring Announcer & Narrator
Task Ono	Ring Announcer
Yasuo Okamoto	President
Yukinori Matsui	Referee

== Alumni/notable guests ==
- Akebono
- Asian Cougar
- Atsushi Maruyama
- Brahman Kei
- Brahman Shu
- Bull James
- Choun Shiryu
- Chocoball Mukai
- Dai Suzuki
- Daigoro Kashiwa
- Daisuke Sekimoto
- Dick Togo
- DJ Nira
- El Generico
- Exciting Yoshida
- Fuma
- Futoshi Miwa
- Gentaro
- Glenn "Q" Spectre
- Guanchulo
- Guts Ishijima
- Hikaru Sato
- Hub
- Isami Kodaka
- Jaki Numazawa
- Jigoku Soldier
- Jiro "Ikemen" Kuroshio
- Joey Janela
- Joey Ryan
- Jun Kasai
- Kai
- Kaji Tomato
- Kazuhiko Ogasawara
- Kazumi Kikuta
- Kendo Kashin
- Kenny Omega
- Kenzo Suzuki
- Kid Lykos
- Kintaro Kanemura
- Kim Nan-pun
- Kohei Kinoshita
- Koju Takeda
- Kota Ibushi
- Kota Sekifuda
- Ladybeard
- Masao Orihara
- Masato Kamino
- Masato Tanaka
- Michael Nakazawa
- Mikami
- Mike Bailey
- Minoru Suzuki
- Mitsunobu Kikuzawa
- Musashi
- Naoki Tanizaki
- Nobutaka Araya
- Nobutaka Moribe
- Nosawa Rongai
- Poison Sawada Julie
- Rising Hayato
- Royce Isaacs
- Ryuichi Kawakami
- Ryuji Ito
- Saki Akai
- Sami Callihan
- Seigo Tachibana
- Seiya Morohashi
- Shigehiro Irie
- Shinobu
- Shiro Koshinaka
- Shinya Ishikawa
- Shoichi Ichimiya
- Shuji Ishikawa
- Super Uchuu Power
- Taka Michinoku
- Takato Nakano
- Takashi Sasaki
- Takayuki Ueki
- Takoyakida
- Tatsumi Fujinami
- Thanomsak Toba
- Tomohiko Hashimoto
- Tsubasa
- Yasu Urano
- Yoshiya
- Yuki Ishikawa
- Yukio Sakaguchi
- Yusuke Kubo
- Zack Sabre Jr.
