= List of DDT Pro-Wrestling tournaments =

DDT Pro-Wrestling (formerly known as Dramatic Dream Team) had held a variety of professional wrestling tournaments competed for by wrestlers that are a part of their roster.

== Sporadic tournaments ==
=== DDT Itabashi Tournament ===
The DDT Itabashi Tournament was a four-man tournament, which took place on April 2, 1999, at the Itabashi Green Hall.

Semifinals
Yusaku	N/A
Hiroki Araiwa	7:48
Keisuke Yamada	N/A
Kengo Takai	7:48

Finals
Yusaku	6:05
Keisuke Yamada	N/A
Third place
Hiroki Araiwa	N/A
Kengo Takai	3:29

=== DDT 6-Man Tag Team Fashion Leader Tournament ===
The DDT 6-Man Tag Team Fashion Leader Tournament was a round-robin tournament held on November 20, 1999. It featured six trios of wrestlers divided between two blocks of three. Instead of their regular ring gear, participants were required to wear more fashionable outfits.

Final standings
Block A		Block B	
Sanshiro Takagi, Exciting Yoshida and Takashi Sasaki	2–0	Super Rider, Asian Cougar and Thanomsak Toba	1–1
Yasuki Shino, Mitsunobu Kikuzawa and Naoshi Sano	1–1	Koichiro Kimura, Kazunori Yoshida and Takao Iwasaki	2–0
Poison Sawada, Tsunehito Naito and Phantom Funakoshi	0–2	Yusaku, Daisaku and Yuki Nishino	0–2

Block A	Takagi E. Yoshida Sasaki	Shino Kikuzawa Sano	Sawada Naito Funakoshi
Takagi E. Yoshida Sasaki	—	Takagi; E. Yoshida; Sasaki (5:21)	Takagi; E. Yoshida; Sasaki (10:40)
Shino Kikuzawa Sano	Takagi; E. Yoshida; Sasaki (5:21)	—	Shino; Kikuzawa; Sano (4:44)
Sawada Naito Funakoshi	Takagi; E. Yoshida; Sasaki (10:40)	Shino; Kikuzawa; Sano (4:44)	—
Block B	Rider Cougar Toba	Kimura K. Yoshida Iwasaki	Yusaku Daisaku Nishino
Rider Cougar Toba	—	Kimura; K. Yoshida; Iwasaki (13:43)	Rider; Cougar; Toba (7:31)
Kimura K. Yoshida Iwasaki	Kimura; K. Yoshida; Iwasaki (13:43)	—	Kimura; K. Yoshida; Iwasaki (12:37)
Yusaku Daisaku Nishino	Rider; Cougar; Toba (7:31)	Kimura; K. Yoshida; Iwasaki (12:37)	—

Finals
A1	Sanshiro Takagi, Exciting Yoshida and Takashi Sasaki	Pin
B1	Koichiro Kimura, Kazunori Yoshida and Takao Iwasaki	14:02

=== y2D Tournament ===
The y2D Tournament was a single-elimination tournament held on January 11, 2001.

Round 1
Mikami	Sub
Issei Fujisawa	6:17
Thanomsak Toba	Pin
Kengo Takai	6:28
Tomohiko Hashimoto	3:28
Hebikage	Pin
Takashi Sasaki	Pin
Yuki Nishino	4:58

Semifinals
Mikami	TKO
Thanomsak Toba	6:00
Takashi Sasaki	3:54
Hebikage	Pin

Finals
Mikami	7:12
Hebikage	Pin

=== Take The Royal Tournament ===
The Take The Royal Tournament was a single-elimination tournament held on April 29, 2001. Mikami defeated Poison Sawada Julie in the final and was then crowned "King of DDT". This tournament is considered the precursor to the annual King of DDT Tournament, first held in 2004.

Round 1
Exciting Yoshida	7:07
Sanshiro Takagi	Pin
Tomohiro Ishii	Pin
Issei Fujisawa	2:54
Poison Sawada Julie	Sub
Chotaro Kamoi	4:01
Hebikage	Pin
Buta-Mamushi	5:28
Super Uchuu Power	Pin
Konica Man	6:41
Tomohiko Hashimoto	Pin
Black "Showa"	5:34
Mikami	Pin
Thanomsak Toba	4:01
Takashi Sasaki	Pin
Retsu Maekawa	3:31

Round 2
Sanshiro Takagi	Pin
Tomohiro Ishii	7:59
Poison Sawada Julie	Sub
Hebikage	7:12
Super Uchuu Power	Pin
Tomohiko Hashimoto	8:06
Mikami	Pin
Takashi Sasaki	9:20

Semifinals
Sanshiro Takagi	5:11
Poison Sawada Julie	Pin
Super Uchuu Power	11:47
Mikami	Pin

Finals
Poison Sawada Julie	14:26
Mikami	Pin

=== 2 Day Tag Tournament ===
The 2 Day Tag Tournament was a single-elimination tag team tournament held over two Wrestling Tonkotsu events at the Fukuoka Dome on December 8 and December 9, 2001.

Round 1 (December 8)
Sanshiro Takagi and Tomohiko Hashimoto	Pin
Basara and Daiyu Kawauchi	12:13
Fake Sanshiro Takagi (Note: Shoichi Ichimiya under the ring name Sanshiro Takagi (高偽三四郎, Takagi Sanshirō) spelled with the kanji 偽 (gi; "fake") instead of 高木) and Tomohiro Ishii	Pin
Fushicho Karasu and Konica Man #2	12:07
Poison Sawada Julie and Takashi Sasaki	Pin
Suicideboyz (Mikami and Thanomsak Toba)	12:38
Asian Cougar and Katsunari Toi	Pin
Super Uchuu Power and Issei Fujisawa	9:32

Semifinals (December 9)
Sanshiro Takagi and Tomohiko Hashimoto	DQ
Fake Sanshiro Takagi and Tomohiro Ishii	9:10
Poison Sawada Julie and Takashi Sasaki	Pin
Asian Cougar and Katsunari Toi	12:12

Finals (December 9)
Sanshiro Takagi and Tomohiko Hashimoto	Pin
Poison Sawada Julie and Takashi Sasaki	11:20

=== KO-D One Night Tag Tournament ===
The KO-D One Night Tag Tournament, or CMLL KO-D Tag Team Championship Tournament, was a single-elimination tag team tournament held on May 18, 2003, at Max Bump 2003. Shoichi Ichimiya and Seiya Morohashi defeated Takashi Sasaki and Super Uchuu Power in the finals to win the CMLL KO-D Tag Team Championship, left vacant on May 8 after Tomohiko Hashimoto suffered an injury.

Round 1
Takashi Sasaki and Super Uchuu Power	Pin
Thanomsak Toba and Rambaa Somdet M16	9:58
Mikami and Kudo	Pin
O.K. Revolution and Issei Fujisawa	3:15
Sanshiro Takagi and Yoshihiro Sakai	Pin
Futoshi Miwa and Kōseiriki	6:57
Kurt Angiru (Note: Shoichi Ichimiya under the ring name Kurt Angiru (カート・アン偽ル, Kāto Angiru) spelled with the kanji 偽 (gi; "fake") instead of アングル (Anguru)) and Seiya Morohashi	Pin
Hero! and Giant Hero!	8:50

Semifinals
Takashi Sasaki and Super Uchuu Power	Pin
Mikami and Kudo	11:13
Sanshiro Takagi and Yoshihiro Sakai	8:08
Shoichi Ichimiya and Seiya Morohashi	Pin

Finals
Takashi Sasaki and Super Uchuu Power	10:09
Shoichi Ichimiya and Seiya Morohashi	Pin

=== Sea of Japan 6-Person Tag Team Championship Tournament ===
On July 20, 2003, DDT held a tournament to crown the first Sea of Japan 6-Person Tag Team Champions at Yoshihiro Sakai: I Shall Return, in Niigata. Team Midbreath (Mr. Strawberry, Yoshihiro Sakai and O.K. Revolution) defeated Super Uchuu Power, Tomohiko Hashimoto and Shuji Ishikawa in the final of the tournament to become the first champions.

Round 1
Team Midbreath (Mr. Strawberry, Yoshihiro Sakai and O.K. Revolution)	Pin
Shoichi Ichimiya, Seiya Morohashi and Futoshi Miwa	11:29
Super Uchuu Power, Tomohiko Hashimoto and Shuji Ishikawa	Pin
Takashi Sasaki, Thanomsak Toba and King Lion	9:43

Finals
Team Midbreath (Mr. Strawberry, Yoshihiro Sakai and O.K. Revolution)	Pin
Super Uchuu Power, Tomohiko Hashimoto and Shuji Ishikawa	10:34

=== KO-D Openweight Championship Contendership Tournament (2005) ===
Between February 9 and February 16, 2005, DDT held a single-elimination tournament to determine the next challenger to the KO-D Openweight Championship held by Dick Togo. Sanshiro Takagi defeated Kudo in the finals and went on to face Togo on February 25, at Don't Try This At Home 2005, but failed to capture the title.

Round 1 (February 9)
Sanshiro Takagi	Pin
Riki Senshu	10:46
Hero!	13:27
Kudo	Pin

Finals (February 16)
Sanshiro Takagi	Pin
Kudo	12:41

=== KO-D Openweight Championship Contendership League ===
Between July 9 and July 25, 2007, DDT held a five-man round-robin tournament to determine the next contender to the KO-D Openweight Championship held by Koo. Danshoku Dino, Harashima and Seiya Morohashi finished tied for first place and went on to face Koo in a four-way elimination match on August 5, at Dramatic Style 2007, but failed to capture the title.

Final standings
Danshoku Dino	5
Harashima	5
Seiya Morohashi	5
Yoshiaki Yago	4
Michael Nakazawa	1

Results	Dino	Harashima	Morohashi	Nakazawa	Yago
Dino	—N/a	Harashima (11:19)	Dino (11:24)	Draw (20:00)	Dino (8:10)
Harashima	Harashima (11:19)	—N/a	Draw (20:00)	Harashima (11:47)	Yago (11:21)
Morohashi	Dino (11:24)	Draw (20:00)	—N/a	Morohashi (10:02)	Morohashi (10:37)
Nakazawa	Draw (20:00)	Harashima (11:47)	Morohashi (10:02)	—N/a	Yago (9:31)
Yago	Dino (8:10)	Yago (11:21)	Morohashi (10:37)	Yago (9:31)	—N/a

=== CMLL KO-D Tag Team Championship League ===
Between April 9 and April 11, 2008, DDT held a four-team round-robin tournament to crown new CMLL KO-D Tag Team Champions over the O-Hanami DDT event series. The title had been left vacant on November 27, 2007, when Prince Togo betrayed his Aloha World Order partner Antonio "The Dragon" Honda and left the stable to form Metal Vampires. Suicideboyz (Mikami and Thanomsak Toba) emerged undefeated and won the vacant title.

Final standings
Mikami and Thanomsak Toba	6
Gentaro and Hoshitango	2
Kudo and Yasu Urano	2
Men's Teioh and Danshoku Dino	2

Results	Gentaro Hoshitango	Kudo Urano	Men's Dino	Mikami Toba
Gentaro Hoshitango	—N/a	Gentaro (Note: As a result of this match, Gentaro also won Urano's Ironman Heavymetalweight Championship.); Hoshitango (10:16)	Men's; Dino (5:06)	Mikami; Toba (10:37)
Kudo Urano	Gentaro; Hoshitango (10:16)	—N/a	Kudo; Urano (11:20)	Mikami; Toba (19:29)
Men's Dino	Men's; Dino (5:06)	Kudo; Urano (11:20)	—N/a	Mikami; Toba (13:42)
Mikami Toba	Mikami; Toba (10:37)	Mikami; Toba (19:29)	Mikami; Toba (13:42)	—N/a

=== Next KO-D Openweight Championship Contender One Night Tournament ===
On July 20, 2008, DDT held a single-elimination tournament to determine the next challenger to the KO-D Openweight Championship held by Dick Togo. Kota Ibushi defeated Kudo in the finals and went on to face Togo on August 31, at Summer Vacation Memories 2008, but failed to capture the title.

Round 1
Thanomsak Toba	Pin
Daichi Kakimoto	1:25
Kudo	Pin
Harashima	10:06
Kota Ibushi	Pin
Hoshitango	4:59
Mikami	CO (Note: This match was restarted two times after originally ending in two double countouts.)
Yasu Urano	1:47

Semifinals
Thanomsak Toba	5:25
Kudo	Pin
Kota Ibushi	Pin
Yasu Urano	19:50

Finals
Kudo	16:53
Kota Ibushi	Pin

=== Top of the Dramatic Cruiser ===
The Top of the Dramatic Cruiser was a single-elimination tournament that took place on June 2, 2013, at Cruiser's Game 11, the final event of the Cruiser's Game brand to be held under the DDT banner.

Round 1
Masa Takanashi	Pin
Marines Mask II	8:39
Tatsuhito Takaiwa	Pin
El Samurai	10:10
Katsumi Usuda	Sub
Kikutaro	9:41
Onryo	10:35
Mikami	Pin

Semifinals
Masa Takanashi	2:34
Tatsuhito Takaiwa	Pin
Katsumi Usuda	9:39
Mikami	Pin

Finals
Tatsuhito Takaiwa	Pin
Mikami	11:46

=== G3 Climax ===
The G3 Climax was a mixed round-robin tournament that took place on August 23, 2013, at Ganbare☆Pro-Wrestling House Show 4, a Ganbare☆Pro-Wrestling-branded event held at Ichigaya Nankai Clinic without a ring, but instead a square mat taped to the floor.

Final standings
Shota	6
Yumehito Imanari	4
Tomohiro Otani	2
Hagane Goriki	0

Results	Goriki	Imanari	Otani	Shota
Goriki	—N/a	Imanari (2:06)	Otani (1:16)	Shota (3:35)
Imanari	Imanari (2:06)	—N/a	Imanari (2:50)	Shota (7:00)
Otani	Otani (1:16)	Imanari (2:50)	—N/a	Shota (3:16)
Shota	Shota (3:35)	Shota (7:00)	Shota (3:16)	—N/a

=== Get the Glory! ===
The Get the Glory! Tournament was a single-elimination tournament that took place on October 23, 2013, at Union Pro Wrestling's 8th Anniversary Show.

Round 1
Shuji Ishikawa	Pin
Sagat	4:45
Fuma	Pin
Daichi Kazato	9:51
Isami Kodaka	Sub
Cherry	5:38
Seiya Morohashi	8:01
Hiroshi Fukuda	Pin

Semifinals
Shuji Ishikawa	Pin
Fuma	3:15
Isami Kodaka	Pin
Hiroshi Fukuda	10:13

Finals
Shuji Ishikawa	Pin
Isami Kodaka	13:26

=== Ganbare☆Martial Arts Open Tournament ===
The Ganbare☆Martial Arts Open Tournament (ガンバレ☆格闘技オープントーナメント, Ganbare Kakutōgi Ōpun Tōnamento) was a single-elimination tournament that took place on May 1, 2014, at Ganbare☆Pro-Wrestling: Chapter 2 2nd Season Vol. 2. It pitted seven wrestlers representing seven different martial arts: Ken Ohka (puroresu), Megane (taekwondo), Shota (American pro-wrestling), Shibatar Maeda (mixed martial arts), Aki Shizuku (amateur wrestling), Hagane Goriki (judo) and Tatsuhito Takaiwa (tai chi).

Round 1
Ken Ohka	Sub
Megane	3:21
Shota	Pin
Shibatar Maeda	3:47
Aki Shizuku	KO
Hagane Goriki	6:38

Semifinals
Ken Ohka	0:24
Shota	CO (Note: This match was restarted after originally ending in a double countout.)
Aki Shizuku	8:51
Tatsuhito Takaiwa	Sub

Finals
Shota	10:38
Tatsuhito Takaiwa	KO

=== KO-D Tag Team Championship Tournament (2015) ===
Between December 6 and December 23, 2015, DDT held a single-elimination tournament to crown new KO-D Tag Team Champions. The title had been left vacant when Kota Ibushi got sidelined by a cervical disc herniation. Konosuke Takeshita and Tetsuya Endo defeated Yuji Okabayashi and Shigehiro Irie in the final of the tournament at Never Mind 2015 to win the vacant title.

Round 1 (December 6, 12)
Happy Motel (Konosuke Takeshita and Tetsuya Endo)	Pin
Shuten Doji (Yukio Sakaguchi and Kota Umeda)	22:34
Yuji Okabayashi and Shigehiro Irie	Pin
Harashima and Ken Ohka	19:47

Finals (December 23)
Happy Motel (Konosuke Takeshita and Tetsuya Endo)	Pin
Yuji Okabayashi and Shigehiro Irie	19:12

=== KO-D 6-Man Tag Team Championship Tournament (2016) ===
Between July 23 and August 6, 2016, DDT held a single-elimination tournament to crown new KO-D 6-Man Tag Team Champions. The title had been left vacant at Audience 2016 on May 29, when Team Dream Futures (Keisuke Ishii, Shigehiro Irie and Soma Takao) split. Damnation (Daisuke Sasaki, Tetsuya Endo and Mad Paulie) defeated Yukio Sakaguchi, Masahiro Takanashi and Kota Umeda in the final of the tournament at Saitama Slam! Vol. 13 to win the vacant title.

Round 1 (July 23, 31)
Team DNA (Kazusada Higuchi, Kouki Iwasaki and Mizuki Watase)	14:24
Damnation (Daisuke Sasaki, Tetsuya Endo and Mad Paulie)	Pin
Fantastic Memories (Danshoku Dino, Keisuke Ishii and Super Sasadango Machine)	9:59
NωA (Makoto Oishi, Shunma Katsumata and Mao)	Pin
Happy Motel (Konosuke Takeshita, Antonio Honda and Trans-Am★Hiroshi)	22:30
Smile Squash (Harashima, Akito and Yasu Urano)	Pin
Shuten Doji (Yukio Sakaguchi, Masahiro Takanashi and Kota Umeda)	Pin
T2Hii (Sanshiro Takagi, Toru Owashi and Kazuki Hirata)	12:45

Semifinals (August 6)
Damnation (Daisuke Sasaki, Tetsuya Endo and Mad Paulie)	Pin
NωA (Makoto Oishi, Shunma Katsumata and Mao)	8:50
Smile Squash; Harashima, Akito and Yasu Urano)	16:09
Shuten Doji (Yukio Sakaguchi, Masahiro Takanashi and Kota Umeda)	Pin

Finals (August 6)
Damnation (Daisuke Sasaki, Tetsuya Endo and Mad Paulie)	Sub
Shuten Doji (Yukio Sakaguchi, Masahiro Takanashi and Kota Umeda)	14:54

== Periodically held tournaments ==
Tournament	Last winner(s)	Last held	Type	Created	Notes
King of DDT	Kazusada Higuchi	2025	Openweight	2004	Single-elimination tournament. (Note: In 2009 and 2010, DDT held this tournament under the name of KO-D Openweight Championship Contendership Tournament.)
D-Oh Grand Prix	Yukio Naya	2024	Openweight	2018	Round-robin tournament.
D Generations Cup	Yuya Koroku	2025	Openweight	2023	Annual tournament featuring the younger talents of DDT.
Ultimate Tag League	Disaster Box (Harashima and Naomi Yoshimura)	2022	Tag team	2000	Tag team round-robin tournament. (Note: Previously held under the names DDT Tag League (2000) and KO-D Tag League (2001–05).)
Young Drama Cup	Soma Takao	2010	Openweight	2009	Round-robin tournament featuring the younger talents of DDT.
D.J.Battle	Kyohei Mikami	1999	Openweight	1998	Single-elimination tournament.
Pro-Wrestling Koshien	Naomi Yoshimura	2017	Openweight	2003	Sporadic single-elimination tournament, previously held as a round-robin tournament in 2003.
Grappling Tournament	Atsushi Aoki	2014	Openweight	2013	Single-elimination grappling tournament, held under special rules for the Hard Hit brand.

=== D.J.Battle ===
==== D.J.Battle 1st ====
The D.J.Battle 1st tournament was a single-elimination inter-promotional tournament held on April 30, 1998, at the Kitazawa Town Hall in Tokyo, Japan. It featured eight participants, five of whom representing other promotions: Yuki Nishino represented Super Professional Wrestling Federation (SPWF), Asian Cougar represented Zipang, Hidetomo Egawa represented Mobius, Great Takeru represented IWA Japan, and Thanomsak Toba represented Kenka Pro-Wrestling Nihei-gumi. Kamen Shooter Super Rider emerged victorious over Kazushige Nosawa in the final.

Round 1
Kamen Shooter Super Rider	Sub
Thanomsak Toba	2R 1:57 (Note: This match was held under special rules in five rounds of three minutes.)
Kyohei Mikami	10:25
Great Takeru	Pin
Kazushige Nosawa	Pin
Yuki Nishino	5:41
Asian Cougar	Pin
Hidetomo Egawa	4:59

Semifinals
Kamen Shooter Super Rider	Sub
Great Takeru	2:11
Kazushige Nosawa	Pin
Asian Cougar	4:36

Finals
Kamen Shooter Super Rider	Sub
Kazushige Nosawa	9:48

==== D.J.Battle 2nd ====
The D.J.Battle 2nd tournament was a single-elimination inter-promotional tournament held on April 27, 1999. It featured eight participants. Akinori Tsukioka represented IWA Japan, Thanomsak Toba represented Kenka Pro-Wrestling Nihei-gumi, Nosawa represented Consejo Mundial de Lucha Libre (CMLL), and Onryo represented Wrestle Yume Factory.

Round 1
Takashi Sasaki	Pin
Akinori Tsukioka	6:52
Block A
Asian Cougar	Pin
Nosawa	6:14
Kyohei Mikami	Sub
Thanomsak Toba	3:30
Block B
Mitsunobu Kikuzawa	7:30
Onryo	Pin

Semifinals
Takashi Sasaki	3:45
Asian Cougar	Sub
Kyohei Mikami	Pin
Onryo	8:22

Finals
Asian Cougar	8:18
Kyohei Mikami	Pin

=== Pro-Wrestling Koshien ===
==== 2003 ====
The 2003 Pro-Wrestling Koshien (プロレス甲子園, Puroresu Kōshien) was a round-robin tournament held from July 26 until August 30. The tournament was held during the LaLaport The Ring series in Funabashi, Chiba.

Final standings
Block A		Block B	
Ryu Echigo	6	O.K. Revolution	9
Kudo	6	Yusuke Inokuma	7
Seiya Morohashi	6	Kikujiro Umezawa	6
Yoshihiro Sakai	6	Shuji Ishikawa	4
Futoshi Miwa	4	"Showa"-taro	2
Daichi Kakimoto	0	Hero!	2

Block A	Echigo	Kakimoto	Kudo	Miwa	Morohashi	Sakai
Echigo	—N/a	Echigo (10:11)	Echigo (11:58)	Echigo (6:53)	Double DQ (8:14)	Sakai (10:53)
Kakimoto	Echigo (10:11)	—N/a	Kudo (11:40)	Miwa (8:08)	Morohashi (6:36)	Sakai (8:35)
Kudo	Echigo (11:58)	Kudo (11:40)	—N/a	Kudo (11:00)	Kudo (12:58)	Sakai (9:56)
Miwa	Echigo (6:53)	Miwa (8:08)	Kudo (11:00)	—N/a	Morohashi (10:15)	Miwa (14:53)
Morohashi	Double DQ (8:14)	Morohashi (6:36)	Kudo (12:58)	Morohashi (10:15)	—N/a	Morohashi (12:49)
Sakai	Sakai (10:53)	Sakai (8:35)	Sakai (9:56)	Miwa (14:53)	Morohashi (12:49)	—N/a
Block B	Hero!	Inokuma	Ishikawa	Revolution	"Showa"-taro	Umezawa
Hero!	—N/a	Inokuma (Forfeit)	Hero! (8:35)	Revolution (Forfeit)	"Showa"-taro (Forfeit)	Umezawa (Forfeit)
Inokuma	Inokuma (Forfeit)	—N/a	Ishikawa (7:51)	Draw (15:00)	Inokuma (9:04)	Inokuma (10:44)
Ishikawa	Hero! (8:35)	Ishikawa (7:51)	—N/a	Revolution (12:13)	Ishikawa (6:16)	Umezawa (6:52)
Revolution	Revolution (Forfeit)	Draw (15:00)	Revolution (12:13)	—N/a	Revolution (8:30)	Revolution (8:56)
"Showa"-taro	"Showa"-taro (Forfeit)	Inokuma (9:04)	Ishikawa (6:16)	Revolution (8:30)	—N/a	Umezawa (9:36)
Umezawa	Umezawa (Forfeit)	Inokuma (10:44)	Umezawa (6:52)	Revolution (8:56)	Umezawa (9:36)	—N/a

Block A Decision (Note: This was a four-way match in which the first two participants to score a fall would advance to the semifinals. Echigo submitted Sakai in 3:08, then Kudo pinned Sakai to end the match at 8:51.) (August 24)
Ryu Echigo	Sub
Kudo	Pin
Seiya Morohashi	—
Yoshihiro Sakai	8:51

Semifinals (August 30)
A1	Ryu Echigo	TKO
B2	Yusuke Inokuma	9:49
A2	Kudo	Pin
B1	O.K. Revolution	10:04

Finals (August 30)
A1	Ryu Echigo	16:37
A2	Kudo	Pin

==== 2015 ====
On August 2, 2015, the Pro-Wrestling Koshien returned as a single-elimination tournament held in the DDT New Attitude (DNA) brand, at Fighting Beer Garden 2015: DNA 8.

Round 1
Shigeru Miyatake	Pin
Dai Suzuki	6:46
Ryota Nakatsu	Sub
Kouki Iwasaki	6:57
Kazusada Higuchi	Pin
Shunma Katsumata	1:47 (Note: This match originally ended in a time limit draw after 10 minutes. It was restarted under 1-count fall rules.)

Semifinals
Shigeru Miyatake	0:20
Ryota Nakatsu	Pin
Kazusada Higuchi	Sub
Kota Umeda	7:33

Finals
Ryota Nakatsu	13:35
Kazusada Higuchi	Pin

==== 2017 ====
The 2017 Pro-Wrestling Koshien was held on August 5, at Fighting Beer Garden 2017: DNA 35.

Round 1
Diego	Pin
Yuki Ueno	6:53
Shunma Katsumata	5:07
Mao	Pin
Naomi Yoshimura	Pin
Dai Suzuki	2:39
Mizuki Watase	Pin
Kouki Iwasaki	0:31

Semifinals
Diego	7:11
Mao	Pin
Naomi Yoshimura	Pin
Mizuki Watase	6:46

Finals
Mao	14:19
Naomi Yoshimura	Pin

=== Grappling Tournament ===
The Grappling Tournament was a single-elimination tournament held in the Hard Hit brand, created in 2008 by Kota Ibushi. In addition to normal pro-wrestling rules, the brand used a point allowance system inspired by UWFi: each wrestler or tag team received a set amount of points at the start of a match; getting knocked down, using the ropes to break a hold or using an illegal maneuver (past a first offense warning) would result in a one-point deduction. A wrestler or team losing all of their points would result in a TKO loss. In the case of a time-limit draw, the side having lost the fewer points would be declared the winner. Match results included the lost points by counting downs, escapes and penalties, noted as "xDyEzP".

==== 2013 ====
The first Grappling Tournament was held on May 19, 2013, at Yokohama Glory Days. It featured four participants competing in 10-minute matches with a three-point allowance.

Round 1
Kosei Kubota	1D0E0P	Sub
Kotaro Nasu	0D1E0P	4:39
Harashima	0D1E0P	Sub
Tomomitsu Matsunaga	0D0E0P	2:58

Finals
Kosei Kubota	0D2E0P	10:00
Harashima	0D1E0P	Points

==== 2014 ====
The second Grappling Tournament was held on February 28, 2014, at Battle Friday.

Round 1
Shuichiro Katsumura	0D0E0P	Sub
Kenta Hattori	0D0E0P	0:44
Atsushi Aoki	0D1E0P	Sub
Koji Iwamoto	0D0E0P	3:23

Finals
Shuichiro Katsumura	0D2E0P	10:00
Atsushi Aoki	0D1E0P	Points

== See also ==
- Professional wrestling tournament
