= DDT Max Bump =

Max Bump
- Promotions: DDT Pro-Wrestling (2001–2019); CyberFight (2021–2023)
- Brand(s): DDT Pro-Wrestling (2021–2023)
- First event: Max Bump
- Last event: Mega Max Bump 2023

Max Bump was a recurring professional wrestling event held annually by DDT Pro-Wrestling (DDT) from 2001 to 2023. It was originally held from 2001 to 2019 by DDT as an independent promotion, and then by CyberFight from 2021 to 2023 as a DDT branded event. It was usually held around the holidays of the Golden Week, between April and May. The 2020 edition was cancelled due to the COVID-19 pandemic. In 2022, the event moved from Tokyo to Yokohama and was renamed Mega Max Bump.

== History ==
From 2001 to 2019, Max Bump was produced by DDT Pro-Wrestling, an independent promotion founded in 1997 by Shintaro Muto and Pro Wrestling Crusaders alumni Kyohei Mikami, Kazushige Nosawa and Sanshiro Takagi. In 2020, DDT and its subsidiaries merged with Pro Wrestling Noah into a new company called CyberFight owned by the digital advertising company CyberAgent, with DDT and Noah persisting as separate brands under the CyberFight umbrella. Max Bump was then held in 2021 as a DDT branded event, then in 2022 and 2023, it was renamed Mega Max Bump and held at the Yokohama Budokan.

== Events ==
#	Event	Date	City	Venue	Main event	Ref.
1	Max Bump	May 18, 2001	Tokyo, Japan	Korakuen Geopolis	Sanshiro Takagi, Mikami and Tachihikari vs. Super Uchuu Power, Exciting Yoshida and Kintaro Kanemura in a HIT match	
2	Max Bump 2002	May 31, 2002	Tokyo, Japan	Korakuen Geopolis	Sanshiro Takagi (c) vs. Kintaro Kanemura for the KO-D Openweight and Ironman Heavymetalweight Championships	
3	Max Bump 2003	May 18, 2003	Tokyo, Japan	Studio Dream Maker	Super Uchuu Power and Takashi Sasaki vs. Kurt Angile and Seiya Morohashi in the final of the KO-D One Night Tag Tournament for the vacant CMLL KO-D Tag Team Championship	
4	Max Bump 2004	May 3, 2004	Tokyo, Japan	Korakuen Hall	Suicideboyz (Mikami and Thanomsak Toba), Hero! and Kudo vs. Takashi Sasaki, Gentaro, Yusuke Inokuma and Shinrei Chiryō no Sensei in a Royal Rumble Elimination match	
5	Max Bump 2005	May 4, 2005	Tokyo, Japan	Korakuen Hall	Dick Togo (c) vs. Sanshiro Takagi in a No Rules match for the KO-D Openweight Championship	
6	Max Bump 2006	May 4, 2006	Tokyo, Japan	Korakuen Hall	Danshoku Dino and Milano Collection A. T. vs. Disaster Box (Toru Owashi and Harashima)	
7	Max Bump 2007	May 4, 2007	Tokyo, Japan	Korakuen Hall	Harashima, Kudo and Kota Ibushi vs. Aloha World Order (Prince Togo, Koo and Antonio "The Dragon" Honda) (with King Ala Moana)	
8	Max Bump 2008	May 6, 2008	Tokyo, Japan	Korakuen Hall	Harashima (c) vs. Sanshiro Takagi vs. Yoshiaki Yago vs. Dick Togo vs. Seiya Morohashi in a five-way elimination match for the KO-D Openweight Championship	
9	Max Bump 2009	May 4, 2009	Tokyo, Japan	Korakuen Hall	Sanshiro Takagi (c) vs. Harashima for the KO-D Openweight Championship	
10	Max Bump 2010	May 4, 2010	Tokyo, Japan	Korakuen Hall	Daisuke Sekimoto (c) vs. Kota Ibushi for the KO-D Openweight Championship	
11	Max Bump 2011	May 4, 2011	Tokyo, Japan	Korakuen Hall	Dick Togo (c) vs. Shuji Ishikawa for the KO-D Openweight Championship	
12	Max Bump 2012	May 4, 2012	Tokyo, Japan	Korakuen Hall	Masa Takanashi (c) vs. Yuji Hino for the KO-D Openweight Championship	
13	Max Bump 2013	May 3, 2013	Tokyo, Japan	Korakuen Hall	Shigehiro Irie (c) vs. Kota Ibushi for the KO-D Openweight Championship	
14	Max Bump 2014	April 29, 2014	Tokyo, Japan	Korakuen Hall	Kudo (c) vs. Akito for the KO-D Openweight Championship; then Kudo (c) vs. Yasu Urano for the KO-D Openweight Championship in Urano's Right to Challenge Anytime Anywhere cash-in match	
15	Max Bump 2015	April 29, 2015	Tokyo, Japan	Korakuen Hall	Kota Ibushi (c) vs. Harashima for the KO-D Openweight Championship	
16	Max Bump 2016	April 24, 2016	Tokyo, Japan	Korakuen Hall	Harashima (c) vs. Kazusada Higuchi for the KO-D Openweight Championship; then Harashima (c) vs. Daisuke Sasaki for the KO-D Openweight Championship in Sasaki's Right to Challenge Anytime Anywhere cash-in match	
17	Max Bump 2017	April 29, 2017	Tokyo, Japan	Korakuen Hall	Konosuke Takeshita (c) vs. Tetsuya Endo for the KO-D Openweight Championship	
18	Max Bump 2018	April 29, 2018	Tokyo, Japan	Korakuen Hall	Konosuke Takeshita (c) vs. Shigehiro Irie for the KO-D Openweight Championship	
19	Max Bump 2019	April 28, 2019	Tokyo, Japan	Korakuen Hall	Tetsuya Endo (c) vs. Makoto Oishi for the KO-D Openweight Championship	
20	Max Bump 2021	May 4, 2021	Tokyo, Japan	Korakuen Hall	Yuki Ueno (c) vs. Soma Takao for the DDT Universal Championship	
21	Mega Max Bump 2022	May 1, 2022	Yokohama, Japan	Yokohama Budokan	Tetsuya Endo (c) vs. Yuki Ueno for the KO-D Openweight Championship	
22	Mega Max Bump 2023	May 3, 2023	Yokohama, Japan	Yokohama Budokan	Yuji Hino (c) vs. Yuki "not Sexy" Iino (Note: Iino was initially billed as Yuki "not Sexy" Iino before the match, but was then billed as Yuki "Super Sexy" Iino in the results) for the KO-D Openweight Championship	
(c) – refers to the champion(s) heading into the match

== Results ==
=== 2001 ===
Max Bump
- Promotion: Dramatic Dream Team
- Date: May 18, 2001
- City: Tokyo, Japan
- Venue: Korakuen Geopolis
- Attendance: 1,001

Event chronology
← Previous; DDT Golden Jack	Next → No Reason, No Future

Max Bump chronology
← Previous; First	Next → 2002

No.	Results	Stipulations	Times
1	Konica Man and Kitano Inferno defeated Ichiman'en Otoko and Cobra	Tag team match	7:22
2	MMM defeated Chotaro Kamoi (c), Blackjack Funk, and Naoshi Sano	Four-way match for the Ironman Heavymetalweight Championship	10:57
3	Hebikage and Mitsunobu Kikujawa defeated Showa and Issei Fujisawa	Tag team match	12:17
4	Tomohiro Ishii defeated Tomohiko Hashimoto, Thanomsak Toba, and Retsu Maekawa	Four-way elimination match	16:21
5	Poison Sawada Julie defeated Takashi Sasaki	Singles match	18:12
6	Sanshiro Takagi, Tachihikari and Mikami defeated Super Uchuu Power, Kintaro Kanemura and Exciting Yoshida	HIT match	25:41
(c) / – the champion(s) heading into the match

=== 2002 ===
Max Bump 2002
- Promotion: Dramatic Dream Team
- Date: May 31, 2002
- City: Tokyo, Japan
- Venue: Korakuen Geopolis
- Attendance: 936

Event chronology
← Previous; Turning Point	Next → Get Alive!

Max Bump chronology
← Previous; 2001	Next → 2003

No.	Results	Stipulations	Times
1	Hebikage and Toguro Habukage defeated Hero! and Showa	Tag team match	7:33
2	Tomo Taniguchi defeated Futoshi Miwa	Singles match	3:04
3	Shoichi Ichimiya defeated Issei Fujisawa	Singles match	7:38
4	Tomohiko Hashimoto and Thanomsak Toba defeated Tetsuhiro Kuroda and Chocoball Mukai	Tag team match	10:31
5	Super Uchuu Power and Poison Sawada Julie defeated Aka-Rangers (Takashi Sasaki and Gentaro)	Tag team match	15:12
6	Kintaro Kanemura defeated Sanshiro Takagi (c)	Singles match for the KO-D Openweight Championship; As a result, Kanemura also won Takagi's Ironman Heavymetalweight Championship.	13:33
(c) / – the champion(s) heading into the match

=== 2003 ===
Max Bump 2003
- Promotion: Dramatic Dream Team
- Date: May 18, 2003
- City: Tokyo, Japan
- Venue: Studio Dream Maker
- Attendance: 349

Event chronology
← Previous; D-Day	Next → Future Port 2003

Max Bump chronology
← Previous; 2002	Next → 2004

No.	Results	Stipulations	Times
1	Mikami and Kudo defeated O.K.Revolution and Issei Fujisawa	KO-D One Night Tag Tournament first round match	3:15
2	Shoichi Ichimiya (Note: Introduced as Kurt Angile (カート・アン偽ル, Kāto Angiru; "Fake Kurt Angle") in the first match, but officially recorded as Shoichi Ichimiya.) and Seiya Morohashi defeated Hero! and Giant Hero!	KO-D One Night Tag Tournament first round match	8:50
3	Strawberry Jam (Sanshiro Takagi and Yoshihiro Sakai) defeated Futoshi Miwa and Kōseiriki	KO-D One Night Tag Tournament first round match	6:57
4	Takashi Sasaki and Super Uchuu Power defeated Thanomsak Toba and Rambaa Somdet M16	KO-D One Night Tag Tournament first round match	9:58
5	Shoichi Ichimiya and Seiya Morohashi defeated Strawberry Jam (Sanshiro Takagi and Yoshihiro Sakai)	KO-D One Night Tag Tournament semifinal	8:08
6	Takashi Sasaki and Super Uchuu Power defeated Mikami and Kudo	KO-D One Night Tag Tournament semifinal	11:13
7	Shoichi Ichimiya and Seiya Morohashi defeated Takashi Sasaki and Super Uchuu Power	KO-D One Night Tag Tournament final for the vacant CMLL KO-D Tag Team Championship	10:09

=== 2004 ===
Max Bump 2004
- Promotion: DDT Pro-Wrestling
- Date: May 3, 2004
- City: Tokyo, Japan
- Venue: Korakuen Hall
- Attendance: 1,840

Event chronology
← Previous; Judgement 8	Next → King of DDT Tournament

Max Bump chronology
← Previous; 2003	Next → 2005

No.	Results	Stipulations	Times
1	Futoshi Miwa, Daichi Kakimoto and Masahiro Takanashi defeated Ken Ohka, Shuji Ishikawa and Mineo Fujita	Six-man tag team match	10:22
2	Naomi Susan defeated Rikiya Shindo	Public Bath Boxing Match	0:49
3	Seiya Morohashi, Hiroyuki Kondo and Yuki Miyazaki defeated Kenshin, Shirley Doe and Showa-ko	Six-man tag team match	9:55
4	Danshoku Dino (c) defeated Glenn "Q" Spectre	Singles match for the Ironman Heavymetalweight Championship	7:44
5	Sanshiro Takagi and Shogi-ko defeated Ishinriki and Super Sumo Machine	Tag team match	12:13
6	Mammoth Sasaki defeated Tomohiko Hashimoto	Street Fight Hardcore Match	10:53
7	Suicide Boyz (Mikami and Thanomsak Toba), Hero! and Kudo defeated Takashi Sasaki, Gentaro, Yusuke Inokuma and Shinrei Chiryō no Sensei	Eight-man elimination rumble	39:58
(c) / – the champion(s) heading into the match

=== 2005 ===
Max Bump 2005
- Promotion: DDT Pro-Wrestling
- Date: May 4, 2005
- City: Tokyo, Japan
- Venue: Korakuen Hall
- Attendance: 2,000

Event chronology
← Previous; Judgement 9	Next → King of DDT 2005

Max Bump chronology
← Previous; 2004	Next → 2006

No.	Results	Stipulations	Times
1	Taka Michinoku defeated Mikami	Singles match	10:42
2	Futoshi Miwa defeated Kenshin (c) and Lingerie Muto	Three-way match for the Ironman Heavymetalweight Championship	5:09
3	Kudo and Kota Ibushi defeated Riki Sensyu and Daichi Kakimoto	Tag team match	8:11
4	Dramatic Three Musketeers (Danshoku Dino [C], Yusuke Inokuma and Muscle Sakai) (with Cherry) defeated Jako (Poison Sawada Julie [C], Jaiant and Jun Inomata) (with Yoshihiko)	Hebitora Contra Homotora Captain's Fall Match	10:04
5	MoroToba (Seiya Morohashi and Thanomsak Toba) defeated Far East Connection (Tomohiko Hashimoto and Nobutaka Moribe) (c), and Macho☆Pump and Sho Kanzaki	Three-way tag team match for the CMLL KO-D Tag Team Championship	13:26
6	Toru Owashi and Shogo Takagi defeated Maginum Tokyo, Hero! and Masa Takanashi	Three-on-two handicap match	6:56
7	Sanshiro Takagi defeated Dick Togo (c)	No rules match for the KO-D Openweight Championship	20:35
(c) / – the champion(s) heading into the match

=== 2006 ===
Max Bump 2006
- Promotion: DDT Pro-Wrestling
- Date: May 4, 2006
- City: Tokyo, Japan
- Venue: Korakuen Hall
- Attendance: 1,362

Event chronology
← Previous; After Aprilfool 2006	Next → Audience 2006

Max Bump chronology
← Previous; 2005	Next → 2007

No.	Results	Stipulations	Times
1	Sanshiro Takagi defeated Jun Inomata	Singles match	6:50
2	The Mac defeated Masa Takamumashi and Seiya Morohashi	Three-way match	6:57
3	"Jet" Shogo won by last eliminating Yusuke "King Jet" Inokuma (Note: Order of elimination: Nosawa "Jet" Rongai, Michael "Jet" Nakazawa, Yoshiaki "Jet" Yago, Thanomsak "Jet" Toba, Mika "Jet" Mi, and Yusuke "King Jet" Inokuma.)	Seven-man Jet Royal for the inaugural JET World Jet Championship	10:20
4	Tatsutoshi Goto and Mitsuya Nagai defeated Poison Sawada Julie and Heavy Ishikawa	Tag team match	9:27
5	Italian Four Horsemen (Francesco Togo and Mori Bernard) (c) defeated Daichi Kakimoto and Kota Ibushi	Tag team match for the CMLL KO-D Tag Team Championship	12:06
6	Danshoku Dino and Milano Collection A. T. defeated Disaster Box (Toru Owashi and Harashima)	Tag team match	18:35
(c) / – the champion(s) heading into the match

=== 2007 ===
Max Bump 2007
- Promotion: DDT Pro-Wrestling
- Date: May 4, 2007
- City: Tokyo, Japan
- Venue: Korakuen Hall
- Attendance: 1,421

Event chronology
← Previous; DDG: Dramatic Dream Gate	Next → King of DDT 2007

Max Bump chronology
← Previous; 2006	Next → 2008

No.	Results	Stipulations	Times
1	Munenori Sawa defeated Thanomsak Toba	Singles match	9:40
2	Danshoku Dino defeated Emi Sakura, Miki Ishii and Makoto	Three-on-one handicap match	5:57
3	Toru Owashi, Yusuke Inokuma and American Balloon defeated Fruits Army (Mango Fukuja, Durian Sawada Julie, Gorgeous Zakuro Matsuno, Mikan, Suika Sakai and Sano Ramen)	Owashi Rumble Chanko Carnival six-on-three handicap match	11:12
4	Nurunuru Brothers (Michael Nakazawa and Tomomitsu Matsunaga) (c) defeated Seiya Morohashi and Masa Takanashi, and Daichi Kakimoto and Hoshitango	Three-way tag team match for the CMLL KO-D Tag Team Championship	13:35
5	Sanshiro Takagi defeated Nosawa Rongai	Weapon Rumble	15:29
6	Harashima, Kota Ibushi and Kudo defeated Aloha World Order (Prince Togo, Koo and Antonio "The Dragon" Honda) (with King Ala Moana)	Six-man tag team match	19:28
(c) / – the champion(s) heading into the match

=== 2008 ===
Max Bump 2008
- Promotion: DDT Pro-Wrestling
- Date: May 6, 2008
- City: Tokyo, Japan
- Venue: Korakuen Hall
- Attendance: 1,421

Event chronology
← Previous; DDG Returns	Next → What Are You Doing 2008

Max Bump chronology
← Previous; 2007	Next → 2009

No.	Results	Stipulations	Times
1^{D}	Gorgeous Matsuno and "Hollywood" Stalker Ichikawa defeated DJ Nira and Koryuki	Tag team match	12:00
2	DDT Legend Army (Thanomsak Toba and Poison Sawada Julie) and Giro Koshinaka defeated Daisuke Sasaki, Yukihiro Abe and Rion Mizuki	Six-man tag team match	8:30
3	Nurunuru Brothers (Michael Nakazawara and Tomomitsu Matsunaga) defeated Gentaro and Hoshitango	DDT Unofficial KO-D Tag Team Championship Next Contender Tournament final	9:08
4	Kudo and Yasu Urano defeated Belt Hunter × Hunter (Masa Takanashi and Danshoku Dino)	DDT Unofficial World's Strongest KO-D Tag Team Championship Next Contender League final As a result, Kudo also won Dino's Ironman Heavymetalweight Championship.	10:56
5	Antonio Honda defeated Koo	Singles match	11:22
6	Kota Ibushi and Daichi Kakimoto defeated Jyushin Thunder Liger and Mikami	Tag team match	14:56
7	Dick Togo defeated Harashima (c), Sanshiro Takagi, Yoshiaki Yago, and Seiya Morohashi (Note: Order of elimination: Yoshiaki Yago, Sanshiro Takagi, Seiya Morohashi, and Harashima.)	Five-way elimination match for the KO-D Openweight Championship	22:38
(c) / – the champion(s) heading into the match; D / – this was a dark match

=== 2009 ===
Max Bump 2009
- Promotion: DDT Pro-Wrestling
- Date: May 4, 2009
- City: Tokyo, Japan
- Venue: Korakuen Hall
- Attendance: 1,703

Event chronology
← Previous; Judgement 2009	Next → Wrestling Tonkotsu 2009

Max Bump chronology
← Previous; 2008	Next → 2010

No.	Results	Stipulations	Times
1^{D}	Kazuhiro Tamura defeated Yukihiro Abe	Singles match	5:50
2	Sasaki and Gabbana defeated Tomokazu Taniguchi	Singles match	8:47
3	Hikaru Sato, Tomomitsu Matsunaga, Rion Mizuki and Keisuke Ishii defeated Poison Sawada Julie, Thanomsak Toba, Yasu Urano and Michael Nakazawa	Eight-man tag team match (Note: The match started as an eight-man battle royal, the loser of which would "join Sawada in the Snake Realm". Sawada lost in one minute, then the battle royal was restarted so that the winner would join instead. All participants except Sawada voluntarily eliminated themselves in a few seconds. Finally, the match was restarted again as a regular eight-man tag team match.)	5:14
4	Kudo defeated Mikami, Hoshitango, and Toru Owashi	Four-way match	8:35
5	Italian Four Horsemen (Francesco Togo, Antonio Honda and Piza Michinoku) (c) defeated Louis Takanashi XIV, Takao Omori and Daisuke Sekimoto	Loser Leaves DDT six-man tag team match for the UWA World Trios Championship	11:22
6	Golden☆Lovers (Kota Ibushi and Kenny Omega) (c) defeated Danshoku Dino and Yoshihiko	Tag team match for the CMLL KO-D Tag Team Championship	22:49
7	Harashima defeated Sanshiro Takagi (c)	Singles match for the KO-D Openweight Championship	21:41
(c) / – the champion(s) heading into the match; D / – this was a dark match

=== 2010 ===
Max Bump 2010
- Promotion: DDT Pro-Wrestling
- Date: May 4, 2010
- City: Tokyo, Japan
- Venue: Korakuen Hall
- Attendance: 1,782

Event chronology
← Previous; Judgement 2010	Next → King of DDT Osaka

Max Bump chronology
← Previous; 2009	Next → 2011

No.	Results	Stipulations	Times
1^{D}	Shigehiro Irie defeated Hiroo Tsumaki	Singles match	4:28
2	Belt Hunter × Hunter (Hikaru Sato and Keisuke Ishii) defeated Soma Takao and Kazuki Hirata	Tag team match	9:36
3	Kenny Omega and Tomomitsu Matsunaga defeated Tiger Toguchi and Poison Sawada Julie	Tag team match	8:51
4	Kudo and Yasu Urano defeated Disaster Box (Toru Owashi and Yukihiro Abe), and Belt Hunter × Hunter (Danshoku Dino and Masa Takanashi)	Three-way tag team match	9:21
5	Yago Duchy Army (Yago Aznable and Abnormal) defeated Mitsuya Nagai and Hoshitango	Máscara Contra Cabellera tag team match	4:07
6	Dick Togo and Harashima defeated Antonio Honda and Daisuke Sasaki	Tag team match	15:25
7	Hentai Big Boss (Sanshiro Takagi and Munenori Sawa) (c) defeated Suicide Boyz (Mikami and Thanomsak Toba)	Tag team match for the KO-D Tag Team Championship	17:18
8	Daisuke Sekimoto (c) defeated Kota Ibushi	Singles match for the KO-D Openweight Championship	20:50
(c) / – the champion(s) heading into the match; D / – this was a dark match

=== 2011 ===
Max Bump 2011
- Promotion: DDT Pro-Wrestling
- Date: May 4, 2011
- City: Tokyo, Japan
- Venue: Korakuen Hall
- Attendance: 1,707

Event chronology
← Previous; Judgement 2011	Next → King of DDT Tokyo

Max Bump chronology
← Previous; 2010	Next → 2012

No.	Results	Stipulations	Times
1	Granma (Yasu Urano and Gentaro) (c) defeated Hero! and Harashima	Tag team match for the KO-D Tag Team Championship	13:03
2	Antonio Honda and Hoshitango defeated Mikami and Gorgeous Matsuno	Tag team match	10:37
3	Danshoku Dino defeated Choun Shiryu, Dragon Chan and Ryoma Lee	Three-on-one handicap match	5:54
4	Keisuke Ishii won by last eliminating Soma Takao	14-person Amon Tsurumi-Style Royal Rumble (Note: Order of entrance: DJ Nira, Rion Mizuki, Michael Nakazawa, Emi Sakura, Tomomitsu Matsunaga, Brahman Shu, Kazuki Hirata, Thanomsak Toba, Choun Shiryu, Makoto Oishi, Keisuke Ishii, Super Shit Machine, and Brahman Kei. Order of elimination: Tomomitsu Matsunaga, Rion Mizuki, Choun Shiryu, Emi Sakura, Kazuki Hirata, Thanomsak Toba, Makoto Oishi, Michael Nakazawa, DJ Nira, Brahman Shu, Brahman Kei, Super Shit Machine, and Soma Takao.)	19:43
5	Kota Ibushi and Kudo defeated Hikaru Sato and Daisuke Sasaki	Tag team match	18:23
6	Shuji Ishikawa defeated Dick Togo (c)	Singles match for the KO-D Openweight Championship	31:18
(c) / – the champion(s) heading into the match

=== 2012 ===
Max Bump 2012
- Promotion: DDT Pro-Wrestling
- Date: May 4, 2012
- City: Tokyo, Japan
- Venue: Korakuen Hall
- Attendance: 2,064

Event chronology
← Previous; Aprilfool 2012	Next → What Are You Doing 2012

Max Bump chronology
← Previous; 2011	Next → 2013

No.	Results	Stipulations	Times
1^{D}	Gorgeous Matsuno vs. Shota ended in a time limit draw	Singles match	—
2	Kai defeated Keisuke Ishii	Singles match	10:34
3	Daisuke Sasaki, Tomomitsu Matsunaga, Shigehiro Irie, Akito and Tetsuya Endo defeated Crying Wolf (Antonio Honda and Keita Yano), Poison Julie Sawada, Hoshitango and Don Michael	Ten-man tag team match	9:51
4	Hikaru Sato defeated DJ Nira	Singles match	9:00
5	New World Japan (Sanshiro Takagi and Soma Takao), Andy Palafox and Yusha Amon defeated Homoiro Clover Z (Danshoku Dino and Makoto Oishi) and Masao Inoue	Four-on-three handicap match	11:24
6	El Generico defeated Kota Ibushi	Singles match	20:12
7	Harashima defeated Kudo and Yasu Urano	Three-way elimination match to determine the No. 1 contender to the KO-D Openweight Championship (Note: Order of elimination: Kudo, and Yasu Urano.)	17:16
8	Yuji Hino defeated Masa Takanashi (c)	Singles match for the KO-D Openweight Championship	26:10
(c) / – the champion(s) heading into the match; D / – this was a dark match

=== 2013 ===
Max Bump 2013
- Promotion: DDT Pro-Wrestling
- Date: May 3, 2013
- City: Tokyo, Japan
- Venue: Korakuen Hall
- Attendance: 1,819

Event chronology
← Previous; April Fool 2013	Next → What Are You Doing 2013

Max Bump chronology
← Previous; 2012	Next → 2014

No.	Results	Stipulations	Times
1^{D}	Tatsuhiko Yoshino and Agressor defeated Tomomitsu Matsunaga and Guanchulo	Tag team match	7:36
2	Monster Army (Daisuke Sasaki, Yuji Hino and Hoshitango) defeated Akito, Tetsuya Endo and Konosuke Takeshita	Six-man tag team match	12:01
3	Golden☆Rendez-Vous (Kenny Omega and Gota Ihashi) defeated Danshoku Dino and Makoto Oishi	Tag team match	10:20
4	Diamond Ring (Katsuhiko Nakajima and Satoshi Kajiwara) defeated Team Dream Futures (Keisuke Ishii and Soma Takao)	Tag team match	15:42
5	Mikami, Masa Takanashi, Michael Nakazawa and DJ Nira defeated Samurai Rangers (Sanshiro Takagi, Toru Owashi, Kazuki Hirata and El Samurai)	Eight-man tag team match As a result, DJ Nira won El Samurai's Right to Challenge Anytime Anywhere contract.	9:42
6	Kudo defeated Antonio Honda	Singles match	13:37
7	Hikaru Sato and Yukio Sakaguchi defeated UraShima (Harashima and Yasu Urano) (c)	Tag team match for the KO-D Tag Team Championship	16:38
8	Shigehiro Irie (c) defeated Kota Ibushi	Singles match for the KO-D Openweight Championship	18:57
(c) / – the champion(s) heading into the match; D / – this was a dark match

=== 2014 ===
Max Bump 2014
- Promotion: DDT Pro-Wrestling
- Date: April 29, 2014
- City: Tokyo, Japan
- Venue: Korakuen Hall
- Attendance: 2,200

Event chronology
← Previous; Judgement 2014	Next → King of DDT 2014

Max Bump chronology
← Previous; 2013	Next → 2015

No.	Results	Stipulations	Times
1^{D}	Hoshitango and Gota Ihashi defeated DJ Nira and Suguru Miyatake	Tag team match	4:36
2	Shuten Doji (Masa Takanashi and Yukio Sakaguchi) defeated Guanchulo and Shunma Katsumata	Tag team match	8:33
3	Sanshiro Takagi (c) won by last eliminating Suguru Miyajake (Note: Order of elimination: Antonio Honja, Yasu Urano, Kazuki Hiraja, Toru Orochi, Mijami, Michael Nakajawa, Soja Takao, Super Jajadango Machine, and Suguru Miyajake.)	10-man battle royal for the Ironman Heavymetalweight Championship; Additionally, Yasu Urano won Antonio Honja's Right to Challenge Anytime Anywhere contract.	7:07
4	Harashima and Tomomitsu Matsunaga defeated Konosuke Takeshita and Tetsuya Endo	Tag team match As a result, Harashima won Endo's Right to Challenge Anytime Anywhere contract.	10:44
5	Team Dream Futures (Keisuke Ishii and Shigehiro Irie) defeated Burning (Jun Akiyama and Yoshinobu Kanemaru) (c)	Tag team match for the All Asia Tag Team Championship	11:41
6	Golden☆Storm Riders (Kota Ibushi, Kenny Omega and Daisuke Sasaki) (c) defeated Danshoku Dino, Makoto Oishi and Yoshihiko	Six-man tag team match for the KO-D 6-Man Tag Team Championship	18:45
7	Kudo (c) defeated Akito	Singles match for the KO-D Openweight Championship	24:26
8	Kudo (c) defeated Yasu Urano	Singles match for the KO-D Openweight Championship; This was Urano's Right to Challenge Anytime Anywhere cash-in match.	10:28
(c) / – the champion(s) heading into the match; D / – this was a dark match

=== 2015 ===
Max Bump 2015
- Promotion: DDT Pro-Wrestling
- Date: April 29, 2015
- City: Tokyo, Japan
- Venue: Korakuen Hall
- Attendance: 2,200

Event chronology
← Previous; Judgement 2015	Next → Audience 2015

Max Bump chronology
← Previous; 2014	Next → 2016

No.	Results	Stipulations	Times
1^{D}	Kazusada Higuchi and Kota Umeda defeated Ryota Nakatsu and Kouki Iwasaki	Tag team match	8:51
2^{D}	Kazusada Higuchi defeated Gota Ihashi (c)	Singles match for the King of Dark Championship; As a result, Ihashi retained the title.	0:52
3	Yukio Sakaguchi defeated Shunma Katsumata	Singles match	4:04
4	YaroZ (Sanshiro Takagi, Toru Owashi, Brother Tommy and Takayuki Ueki) defeated Boyz (Makoto Oishi, Akito, Soma Takao and Kazuki Hirata)	Eight-man tag team match	9:51
5	Shuten Doji (Kudo and Masa Takanashi) defeated Happy Motel (Antonio Honda and Konosuke Takeshita)	Tag team match	10:50
6	Daisuke Sasaki won by last eliminating Danshoku Jinsei and Suguru Miyatake (Note: Order of entrance: Hiroshi Fukuda, Danshoku Jinsei, Hoshitango, Yasu Urano, Mikami, Daisuke Sasaki, DJ Nira, Saki Akai, and Suguru Miyatake. Order of elimination: Hoshitango, Yasu Urano, Mikami, Saki Akai, DJ Nira, Hiroshi Fukuda, Danshoku Jinsei, and Suguru Miyatake.)	Right to Challenge Anytime Anywhere Battle Royal; As a result, Sasaki also won Yasu Urano's RTCAA contract; and DJ Nira won Saki Akai's RTCAA contract.	11:40
7	Strong BJ (Daisuke Sekimoto and Yuji Okabayashi) (c) defeated Team Dream Futures (Keisuke Ishii and Shigehiro Irie)	Tag team match for the KO-D Tag Team Championship	18:46
8	Harashima defeated Kota Ibushi (c)	Singles match for the KO-D Openweight Championship	25:54
(c) / – the champion(s) heading into the match; D / – this was a dark match

=== 2016 ===
Max Bump 2016
- Promotion: DDT Pro-Wrestling
- Date: April 24, 2016
- City: Tokyo, Japan
- Venue: Korakuen Hall
- Attendance: 1,633

Event chronology
← Previous; Judgement 2016	Next → Friendship, Effort & Victory in Nagoya 2016

Max Bump chronology
← Previous; 2015	Next → 2017

No.	Results	Stipulations	Times
1^{D}	Hoshitango (c) defeated Tomomitsu Matsunaga, and Gota Ihashi	Three-way match for the King of Dark Championship; As a result, Ihashi won the title.	5:28
2	T2Hii (Sanshiro Takagi and Toru Owashi) and Jiro "Ikemen" Kuroshio defeated Shunma Katsumata, Kouki Iwasaki and Guanchulo	Six-man tag team match	5:43
3	Saki Akai and Makoto Oishi defeated LiLiCo and Mizuki Watase	Tag team match As a result, Akai won LiLiCo's Ironman Heavymetalweight Championship.	8:33
4	Happy Motel (Antonio Honda and Hiroshi Fukuda) and Heddi French defeated Danshoku Dino, Soma Takao and Mao Inoue	Six-man tag team match	7:22
5	Smile Squash (Akito and Yasu Urano) defeated Shuten Doji (Yukio Sakaguchi and Masa Takanashi), and Team Dream Futures (Keisuke Ishii and Shigehiro Irie)	Three-way tag team match to determine the No. 1 contenders to the KO-D Tag Team Championship	9:46
6	Super Sasadango Machine (c) defeated Kazuki Hirata	Ultimate CCC match for the DDT Extreme Championship	7:21
7	Daisuke Sasaki and Shuji Ishikawa (c) defeated Happy Motel (Konosuke Takeshita and Tetsuya Endo)	Tag team match for the KO-D Tag Team Championship	15:22
8	Harashima (c) defeated Kazusada Higuchi	Singles match for the KO-D Openweight Championship	18:58
9	Daisuke Sasaki defeated Harashima (c)	Singles match for the KO-D Openweight Championship; This was Sasaki's Right to Challenge Anytime Anywhere cash-in match.	1:45
(c) / – the champion(s) heading into the match; D / – this was a dark match

=== 2017 ===
Max Bump 2017
- Promotion: DDT Pro-Wrestling
- Date: April 29, 2017
- City: Tokyo, Japan
- Venue: Korakuen Hall
- Attendance: 1,635

Event chronology
← Previous; Judgement 2017	Next → Audience 2017

Max Bump chronology
← Previous; 2016	Next → 2018

No.	Results	Stipulations	Times
1^{P}	Yuki Ueno defeated Daiki Shimomura	Singles match	4:08
2	Antonio Honda defeated Keisuke Ishii, Yasu Urano, Kouki Iwasaki, and Royce Isaacs	Five-way match to determine the No. 1 contender to the DDT Extreme Championship	7:06
3	NωA (Makoto Oishi, Shunma Katsumata and Mao) (c) defeated T2Hii (Sanshiro Takagi, Toru Owashi and Kazuki Hirata)	Six-man tag team match for the KO-D 6-Man Tag Team Championship; As a result, Oishi won Hirata's Right to Challenge Anytime Anywhere contract, and Hirata was exiled from Japan.	6:05
4	Damnation (Daisuke Sasaki and Mad Paulie) and Heidi Katrina defeated Shuten Doji (Kudo and Masahiro Takanashi) and Saki Akai	Six-person tag team match	10:21
5	Akito defeated Soma Takao	Singles match	6:34
6	Shigehiro Irie and Kazusada Higuchi defeated Harashima and Mike Bailey	Tag team match	9:42
7	New No Fear (Yoshihiro Takayama and Danshoku Dino) defeated Masakatsu Funaki and Yukio Sakaguchi (c)	Tag team match for the KO-D Tag Team Championship	10:33
8	Konosuke Takeshita (c) vs. Tetsuya Endo ended in a time limit draw	Singles match for the KO-D Openweight Championship	1:00:00
(c) / – the champion(s) heading into the match; P / – the match was broadcast on the pre-show

=== 2018 ===
Max Bump 2018
- Promotion: DDT Pro-Wrestling
- Date: April 29, 2018
- City: Tokyo, Japan
- Venue: Korakuen Hall
- Attendance: 1,279

Event chronology
← Previous; April Fool 2018	Next → Audience 2018

Max Bump chronology
← Previous; 2017	Next → 2019

No.	Results	Stipulations	Times
1^{P}	Mad Paulie defeated Kouki Iwasaki	Singles match	6:26
2	Go Shiozaki defeated Kota Umeda	Singles match	8:39
3	Yukio Sakaguchi, Mike Bailey, Mao and Saki Akai defeated T2Hii (Toru Owashi and Kazuki Hirata), Super Sasadango Machine and Antonio Honda	Eight-person tag team match As a result, Hirata was exiled from Japan.	7:46
4	Soma Takao and Yuki Ueno defeated Kazusada Higuchi and Keisuke Ishii	Tag team match	6:43
5	Jason "The Gift" Kincaid and Mizuki Watase defeated Shunma Katsumata and Tomomitsu Matsunaga, and Damnation (Daisuke Sasaki and Tetsuya Endo)	Three-way tag team match	7:14
6	Danshoku Dino and Shuten Doji (Kudo and Masahiro Takanashi) defeated Cherry, Françoise☆Takagi and Mako Oishi	Six-person tag team match	11:23
7	Harashima defeated Yuko Miyamoto (c)	Singles match for the DDT Extreme Championship	12:51
8	Shigehiro Irie defeated Konosuke Takeshita (c)	Singles match for the KO-D Openweight Championship	18:17
(c) / – the champion(s) heading into the match; P / – the match was broadcast on the pre-show

=== 2019 ===
Max Bump 2019
- Promotion: DDT Pro-Wrestling
- Date: April 28, 2019
- City: Tokyo, Japan
- Venue: Korakuen Hall
- Attendance: 1,130

Event chronology
← Previous; April Fool 2019 in Shin-Kiba	Next → King of DDT 2019

Max Bump chronology
← Previous; 2018	Next → 2021

No.	Results	Stipulations	Times
1	Disaster Box (Toru Owashi and Kazuki Hirata) defeated Masahiro Takanashi and Pokotan (with Danshoku Dino)	Tag team match	7:23
2	Keisuke Okuda and Disaster Box (Yuki Ueno and Naomi Yoshimura) defeated Kota Umeda, Mizuki Watase and Yuki Iino	Six-person tag team match	8:38
3	Saki Akai and Asuka defeated Damnation (Mad Paulie and Nobuhiro Shimatani)	Tag team match	7:48
4	Yoshiaki Yatsu, Sanshiro Takagi and Yukio Sakaguchi defeated Akito, Kazusada Higuchi and Hiroshi Yamato	Six-person tag team match As a result, Takagi won Yamato's Right to Challenge Anytime Anywhere contract.	8:19
5	Antonio Honda defeated Harashima (c)	Panty☆Hunt Tiger Cub Rope Deathmatch for the DDT Extreme Championship	12:04
6	Damnation (Daisuke Sasaki and Soma Takao) (c) defeated Moonlight Express (Mike Bailey and Mao), and Ricky Starks and Mike Rollins	Three-way tag team match for the KO-D Tag Team Championship	13:13
7	Shinya Aoki defeated Konosuke Takeshita	Singles match	7:03
8	Tetsuya Endo (c) defeated Makoto Oishi	Singles match for the KO-D Openweight Championship	28:18
(c) / – the champion(s) heading into the match

=== 2021 ===
Max Bump 2021
- Promotion: CyberFight
- Brand: DDT Pro-Wrestling
- Date: May 4, 2021
- City: Tokyo, Japan
- Venue: Korakuen Hall
- Attendance: 0 (Note: The event was held without a live audience due to the COVID-19 pandemic in Japan.)

Event chronology
← Previous; April Fool 2021	Next → Ultimate Tag League 2021

Max Bump chronology
← Previous; 2019	Next → 2022

No.	Results	Stipulations	Times
1	Kikutaro defeated Danshoku Dino, and Antonio Honda	Three-way match	7:11
2	Akito defeated Mad Paulie	Singles match	7:59
3	Team Thoroughbred (Sanshiro Takagi, Yukio Naya, Chikara and Yakan Nabe) defeated Keigo Nakamura, Hideki Okatani, Toui Kojima and Yuya Koroku	Eight-man tag team match for the KO-D 8-Man Tag Team Championship	9:17
4	The37Kamiina (Konosuke Takeshita, Shunma Katsumata and Mao) defeated Eruption (Kazusada Higuchi and Yukio Sakaguchi) and Yuki Iino, and Damnation (Daisuke Sasaki, Tetsuya Endo and Yuji Hino)	Three-way six-man tag team match	11:26
5	Chris Brookes (Extreme) defeated Saki Akai (Ironman)	Winner Takes All match for the DDT Extreme Championship and Ironman Heavymetalweight Championship	17:38
6	Junretsu (Jun Akiyama, Makoto Oishi and Yusuke Okada) defeated Disaster Box (Harashima, Toru Owashi and Kazuki Hirata)	Six-man tag team match	11:42
7	Yuki Ueno (c) defeated Soma Takao	Singles match for the DDT Universal Championship	25:39
(c) / – the champion(s) heading into the match

=== 2022 ===
Mega Max Bump 2022 in Yokohama
- Promotion: CyberFight
- Brand: DDT Pro-Wrestling
- Date: May 1, 2022
- City: Yokohama, Japan
- Venue: Yokohama Budokan
- Attendance: 835

Event chronology
← Previous; King of Street Wrestling	Next → Audience 2022

Max Bump chronology
← Previous; 2021	Next → 2023

No.	Results	Stipulations	Times
1^{P}	Kanon defeated Yuya Koroku	Singles match	7:22
2^{P}	Disaster Box (Toru Owashi and Naomi Yoshimura) defeated Antonio Honda and Yuki Ishida	Tag team match	9:33
3	Shinya Aoki defeated Toui Kojima	Singles match	5:04
4	DDT Legend Army (Poison Sawada Julie, Takashi Sasaki, Gentaro, Mikami and Thanomsak Toba) (c) (with Naomi Susan) defeated Sanshiro Takagi, Yoshiaki Yatsu, Akito, Kazuki Hirata and Gota Ihashi	Ten-man tag team match for the KO-D 10-Man Tag Team Championship	8:45
5	Maya Yukihi and Shunma Katsumata defeated Eruption (Saki Akai and Hideki Okatani)	Tag team match	10:28
6	Hisaya Imabayashi, Akira and Muscle Sakai defeated Pheromones (Yuki "Sexy" Iino, Danshoku "Dandy" Dino and Yumehito "Fantastic" Imanari)	Six-man tag team match	16:55
7	Damnation T.A. (Daisuke Sasaki, MJ Paul and Kanon) defeated Yuji Hino, Yukio Naya and Soma Takao	Six-man tag team match	10:43
8	Eruption (Kazusada Higuchi and Yukio Sakaguchi) defeated Harashima and Hikaru Sato	Tag team match	14:25
9	Mao (c) defeated Asuka	Singles match for the DDT Universal Championship	13:51
10	Calamari Drunken Kings (Chris Brookes and Masahiro Takanashi) (c) defeated Burning (Jun Akiyama and Yusuke Okada)	Tag team match for the KO-D Tag Team Championship	21:09
11	Tetsuya Endo (c) defeated Yuki Ueno	Singles match for the KO-D Openweight Championship	31:17
(c) / – the champion(s) heading into the match; P / – the match was broadcast on the pre-show

=== 2023 ===
The 2023 edition of Max Bump was held on May 3 at the Yokohama Budokan. In the main event, Yuji Hino defeated Yuki "not Sexy" Iino to retain the KO-D Openweight Championship.
