= Mega Max Bump 2023 =

2023 DDT Pro-Wrestling event

- Promotional poster featuring various DDT wrestlers
- Promotion: CyberFight
- Brand: DDT Pro-Wrestling
- Date: May 3, 2023
- City: Yokohama, Japan
- Venue: Yokohama Budokan
- Attendance: 1,160

Event chronology
← Previous; Judgement 2023	Next → Wrestle Peter Pan 2023

Max Bump chronology
← Previous; 2022	Next → —

Mega Max Bump 2023 in Yokohama was a professional wrestling event promoted by CyberFight's DDT Pro-Wrestling (DDT). It took place on May 3, 2023, in Yokohama, at the Yokohama Budokan.

Thirteen matches were contested at the event, including three on the pre-show, and three of DDT's nine championships were on the line. The main event saw Yuji Hino defeat Yuki "not Sexy" Iino to retain the KO-D Openweight Championship. Other top matches included Tetsuya Endo successfully defending the DDT Universal Championship against Mao, and Shunma Katsumata defeated Jun Akiyama in a toys, ladders, and chairs match to retain the DDT Extreme Championship.

== Storylines ==
The event featured thirteen professional wrestling matches that involved different wrestlers from pre-existing scripted feuds and storylines. Wrestlers portrayed villains, heroes, or less distinguishable characters in the scripted events that built tension and culminated in a wrestling match or series of matches. The event's press conference was held on April 27, 2023, and was broadcast live on DDT's YouTube channel.

== Event ==
=== Preliminary matches ===
The event started with three pre-show bouts in which three of the Pheromones stable members took on distinctive opponents in singles competition. In the first one, Yumehito "Fantastic" Imanari defeated Rukiya, in the second one, Illusion defeated Pheromones' leader Danshoku "Dandy" Dino, and in the third one, Koju "Shining Ball" Takeda defeated Yuki Ishida. In the first main card match, Munetatsu Nakamura and Yuya Koroku picked up a win over Kazuma Sumi and Toy Kojima in tag team action. Next up, joshi talent Saki Akai outmatched Rayne Leverkusen. The sixth bout saw Daisuke Sasaki, Minoru Fujita and MJ Paul picking up victories over Soma Takao, Yusuke Okada and a returning Diego. The seventh bout saw Kazuki Hirata defeating Hikaru Machida in the fourth round of a Martial arts rules match. Next up, Akito, Chiitan and Toru Owashi defeated Antonio Honda and Calamari Drunken Kings (Chris Brookes and Masahiro Takanashi) in six-man tag team action. The next bout saw two of the DDTeeen!! competitors in action as Yuki Ueno and Yuni defeated Takeshi Masada and Ventvert Jack. In the tenth bout, one half of the KO-D Tag Team Champions and The37Kamiina member Shunma Katsumata defeated Jun Akiyama in a Toys, ladders and chairs match to win the DDT Extreme Championship for the second time in his career. Next, Kanon, Kazusada Higuchi, Naruki Doi and Yukio Sakaguchi defeated Harashima, Hideki Okatani, Kotaro Suzuki and Sanshiro Takagi in an eight-man tag team match that served as a preview for the 2023 edition of the King of DDT Tournament.

In the semi main event of the evening, Burning stable leader Tetsuya Endo successfully secured his first defense of the DDT Universal Championship over the other half of the KO-D Tag Team Champions Mao. After the bout concluded, a yet to be revealed competitor who reached out via video laid a challenge to Endo for July 21, 2023. It was mentioned that the mystery wrestler was a former WWE roster member whose name will be revealed on the day of the King of DDT finals on May 21.

=== Main event ===
In the main event of the evening, Yuji Hino successfully defended the KO-D Openweight Championship for the second time consecutively in that respective reign against Yuki "not Sexy" Iino.

== Results ==
No.	Results	Stipulations	Times
1^{P}	Yumehito "Fantastic" Imanari defeated Rukiya by pinfall	Singles match	4:07
2^{P}	Ilusion defeated Danshoku "Dandy" Dino by pinfall	Singles match	5:21
3^{P}	Koju "Shining Ball" Takeda defeated Yuki Ishida by pinfall	Singles match	4:54
4	Munetatsu Nakamura and Yuya Koroku defeated Kazuma Sumi and Toy Kojima by pinfall	Tag team match	8:36
5	Saki Akai defeated Rayne Leverkusen by pinfall	Singles match	5:51
6	Damnation T.A (Daisuke Sasaki, Minoru Fujita and MJ Paul) defeated Diego, Soma Takao and Yusuke Okada by pinfall	Six-man tag team match	11:09
7	Kazuki Hirata defeated Hikaru Machida by pinfall	Martial arts rules match	4R 3:32
8	Akito, Chiitan and Toru Owashi defeated Antonio Honda and Calamari Drunken Kings (Chris Brookes and Masahiro Takanashi) by pinfall	Six-man tag team match	10:26
9	Yuki Ueno and Yuni defeated Takeshi Masada and Ventvert Jack by pinfall	Tag team match	12:03
10	Shunma Katsumata defeated Jun Akiyama (c) by pinfall	Toys, ladders and chairs match for the DDT Extreme Championship	17:03
11	Kanon, Kazusada Higuchi, Naruki Doi and Yukio Sakaguchi defeated Harashima, Hideki Okatani, Kotaro Suzuki and Sanshiro Takagi by pinfall	Eight-man tag team match	10:40
12	Tetsuya Endo (c) defeated Mao by pinfall	Singles match for the DDT Universal Championship	19:17
13	Yuji Hino (c) defeated Yuki "not Sexy" Iino by pinfall	Singles match for the KO-D Openweight Championship	22:28
(c) / – the champion(s) heading into the match; P / – the match was broadcast on the pre-show
