= Osaka Octopus =

- Promotions: DDT Pro-Wrestling
- First event: Osaka Octopus 2015
- Last event: Osaka Octopus 2019

Osaka Octopus (大阪オクトパス, Ōsaka Okutopasu) was a recurring professional wrestling event held by DDT Pro-Wrestling (DDT) at the Osaka Prefectural Gymnasium in 2015, 2016, and 2019.

== History ==
From 2015 to 2019, Osaka Octopus was produced by DDT Pro-Wrestling, a Tokyo-based independent promotion founded in 1997 by Shintaro Muto and Pro Wrestling Crusaders alumni Kyohei Mikami, Kazushige Nosawa and Sanshiro Takagi. The three editions were held at the Edion Arena in Osaka.

== Events ==
#	Event	Date	City	Venue	Main event	Ref.
1	Osaka Octopus 2015	November 28, 2015	Osaka, Japan	Osaka Prefectural Gymnasium	Yukio Sakaguchi (c) vs. Isami Kodaka for the KO-D Openweight Championship	
2	Osaka Octopus 2016	December 4, 2016	Osaka, Japan	Osaka Prefectural Gymnasium	Shuji Ishikawa (c) vs. Harashima for the KO-D Openweight Championship	
3	Osaka Octopus 2019	September 1, 2019	Osaka, Japan	Osaka Prefectural Gymnasium	Konosuke Takeshita (c) vs. Shinya Aoki for the KO-D Openweight Championship	

== Results ==
=== 2015 ===
Osaka Octopus 2015
- Promotion: DDT Pro-Wrestling
- Date: November 28, 2015
- City: Osaka, Japan
- Venue: Osaka Prefectural Gymnasium
- Attendance: 2,223

Osaka Octopus chronology
← Previous —	Next → 2016

No.	Results	Stipulations	Times
1^{D}	Kouki Iwasaki (c) and Tomomitsu Matsunaga defeated Shoichi Uchida and Dai Suzuki	Tag team match for the King of Dark Championship; Since Matsunaga scored the fall, Iwasaki retained his title.	3:33
2	Smile Squash (Akito and Yasu Urano), Ryota Nakatsu and Kota Umeda defeated Team Dream Futures (Keisuke Ishii and Soma Takao), Mao Inoue and Mizuki Watase	Eight-man tag team match	8:55
3	Super Sasadango Machine vs. RG and Ryota Yamasato ended in a draw	Two-on-one handicap match	9:34
4	Saki Akai won by last eliminating Cherry (Note: Order of entrance: Kikutaro (c), Cherry, Makoto Oishi, Shunma Katsumata, Kiai-ryuken Ecchan, Saki Akai, Kazuki Hirata, Toru Owashi, Suguru Miyatake, Gota Ihashi, Masa Takanashi, and Yoshihiko. Order of elimination: Kikutaro, Shunma Katsumata, Kiai-ryuken Ecchan, Makoto Oishi, Kazuki Hirata, Toru Owashi, Yoshihiko, Suguru Miyatake, Gota Ihashi, Gota Ihashi's pants, Masa Takanashi, and Cherry.)	12-person Rumble rules battle royal for the Ironman Heavymetalweight Championship	14:35
5	Daisuke Sasaki defeated Sanshiro Takagi, Kenso, Yuko Miyamoto, Kazusada Higuchi, and Ken Ohka	Hardcore six-way match	15:21
6	Kendo Kashin defeated Antonio Honda (c)	UWF Rules + 3-Count Pinfall + 20-Countout Hybrid Rules match for the DDT Extreme Championship	9:26
7	Danshoku Dino and Brahman Brothers (Brahman Shu and Brahman Kei) defeated Joey Ryan and Happy Motel (Hiroshi Fukuda and Tetsuya Endo)	Six-man tag team match	14:51
8	Yuji Okabayashi defeated Shigehiro Irie	Singles match	16:55
9	Harashima defeated Konosuke Takeshita	Singles match	18:30
10	Isami Kodaka defeated Yukio Sakaguchi (c)	Singles match for the KO-D Openweight Championship	18:05
(c) / – the champion(s) heading into the match; D / – this was a dark match

=== 2016 ===
Osaka Octopus 2016
- Promotion: DDT Pro-Wrestling
- Date: December 4, 2016
- City: Osaka, Japan
- Venue: Edion Arena Osaka
- Attendance: 2,355

Osaka Octopus chronology
← Previous; 2015	Next → 2019

No.	Results	Stipulations	Times
1^{D}	Kouki Iwasaki, Guanchulo and Daiki Shimomura defeated Nobuhiro Shimatani (c), Mizuki Watase and Rekka	Six-man tag team match for the King of Dark Championship; As a result, Shimatani retained his title.	6:43
2	Kudo, Soma Takao and Naomi Yoshimura defeated Keisuke Ishii, Akito and Yuki Ueno	Six-man tag team match	11:47
3	Aja Kong and LiLiCo defeated Saki Akai and Ladybeard	Tag team match	8:12
4	Kuishinbo Kamen won by last eliminating Kikutaro (Note: Order of entrance: Butaman (c), Kazuki Hirata, Masahiro Takanashi, Kenshin Chikano, Mad Paulie, Kuishinbo Kamen, Shoichi Uchida, Dai Suzuki, Kikutaro, Toru Owashi, and Yoshihiko. Order of elimination: Butaman, Mad Paulie, Dai Suzuki, Shoichi Uchida, Kenshin Chikano, Masahiro Takanashi, Kazuki Hirata, Yoshihiko, Toru Owashi, and Kikutaro.)	11-person Rumble rules battle royal for the Ironman Heavymetalweight Championship	17:48
5	Shigehiro Irie, Yasu Urano and Yuni defeated NωA (Makoto Oishi, Shunma Katsumata and Mao)	Six-man tag team match	9:23
6	Masakatsu Funaki and Yukio Sakaguchi defeated Yoshihiro Takayama and Kazusada Higuchi	Tag team match	9:39
7	Sanshiro Takagi, Kota Ibushi and Gota Ihashi defeated Dick Togo, Antonio Honda and Takashi Sasaki	Takoyaki, ladders, and chairs match	15:03
8	Jun Kasai defeated Danshoku Dino (c)	Dōyama Hardcore match for the DDT Extreme Championship	13:05
9	Konosuke Takeshita and Mike Bailey defeated Damnation (Daisuke Sasaki and Tetsuya Endo) (c)	Tag team match for the KO-D Tag Team Championship	23:34
10	Harashima defeated Shuji Ishikawa (c)	Singles match for the KO-D Openweight Championship	21:28
(c) / – the champion(s) heading into the match; D / – this was a dark match

=== 2019 ===
Osaka Octopus 2019
- Promotion: DDT Pro-Wrestling
- Date: September 1, 2019
- City: Osaka, Japan
- Venue: Edion Arena Osaka
- Attendance: 678

Osaka Octopus chronology
← Previous; 2016	Next → —

No.	Results	Stipulations	Times
1	Cody Hall, Antonio Honda and Yasu Urano defeated Yukio Sakaguchi, Mizuki Watase and Yukio Naya	Six-man tag team match	10:15
2	Asuka won by last eliminating Saki Akai (Note: Other participants included Puma King (c), Masahiro Takanashi, Mad Paulie, Yuni, and Kazuki Hirata.)	Seven-person Rumble rules battle royal for the Ironman Heavymetalweight Championship	9:16
3	Harashima and Mao defeated Jun Masaoka and Kohei Kinoshita	Tag team match	10:50
4	All Out (Akito and Shunma Katsumata) vs. Danshoku Dino and Maku Donaruto ended in a no contest	Tag team match	14:10
5	Sanshiro Takagi (c) defeated Ken Ohka	Recycled Weapon Rumble Deathmatch for the O-40 Championship	12:40
6	Damnation (Shuji Ishikawa and Tetsuya Endo) defeated Nautilus (Yuki Ueno and Naomi Yoshimura)	Tag team match	17:08
7	Damnation (Daisuke Sasaki and Soma Takao) (c) defeated Jiro "Ikemen" Kuroshio and Kazusada Higuchi	Tag team match for the KO-D Tag Team Championship	17:22
8	Konosuke Takeshita (c) defeated Shinya Aoki	Singles match for the KO-D Openweight Championship	16:45
(c) / – the champion(s) heading into the match
