= Nobutaka Moribe =

Japanese professional wrestler

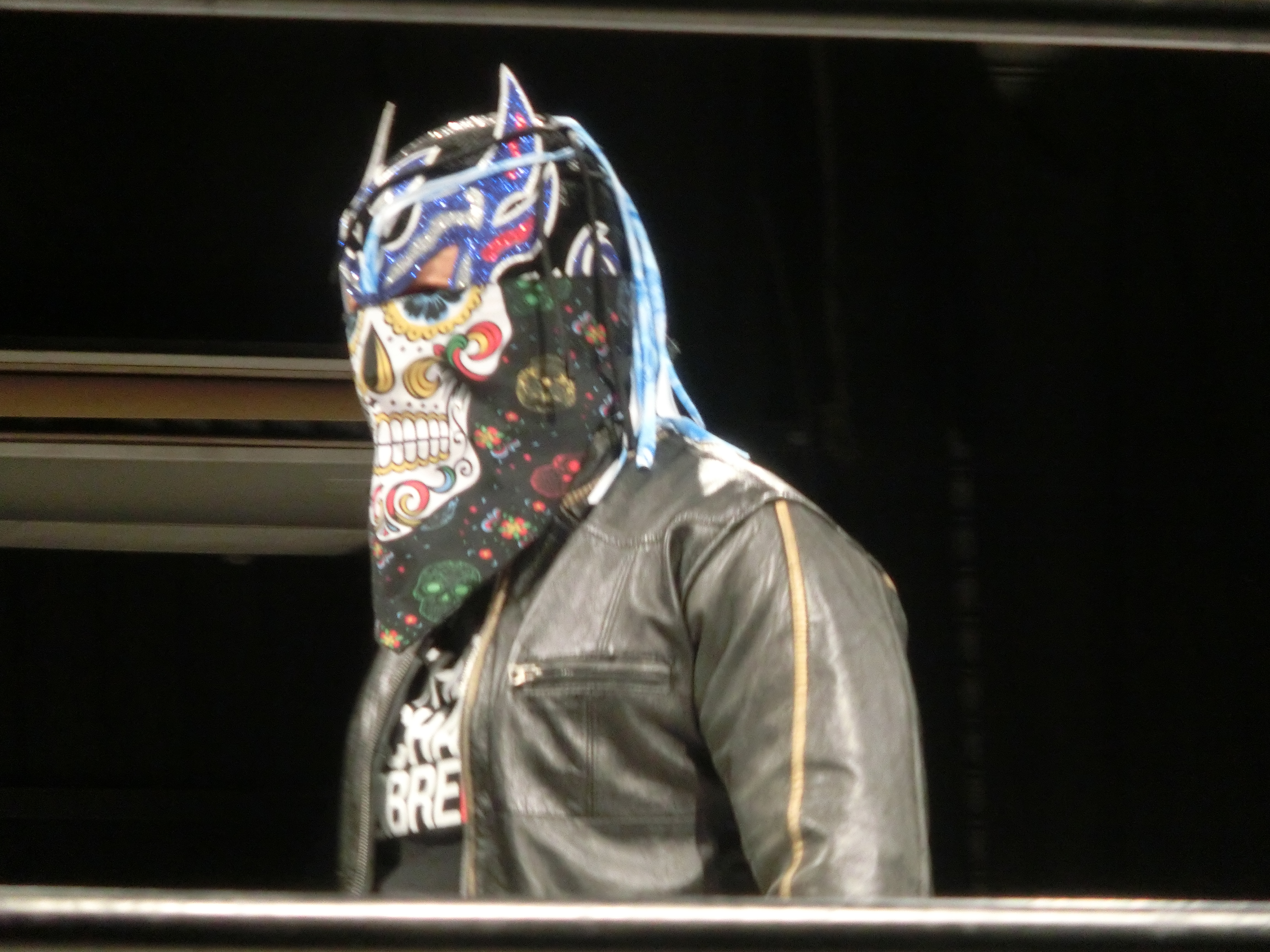
- Moribe in June 2018

Personal information
- Born: February 15, 1982 (age 44) Okayama, Japan

Professional wrestling career
- Ring name(s): Mori Bernard; Nobutaka Moribe
- Billed height: 173 cm (5 ft 8 in)
- Billed weight: 90 kg (198 lb)
- Trained by: Dick Togo
- Debut: 2003

Nobutaka Moribe (守部宣孝, Moribe Noritaka) previously known by his ring name Mori Bernard (モリ・ベルナルド, Mori Berunarudo) is a Japanese professional wrestler currently working as a freelancer and is best known for his tenure with the Japanese promotions DDT Pro-Wrestling and Kaientai Dojo.

== Professional wrestling career ==
=== (2003–2007) ===
Moribe made his professional wrestling debut at a house show promoted by World Entertainment Wrestling (WEW) on January 31, 2003, where he picked up a win against DJ Nira. As a freelancer, Moribe is known for competing in various promotions. At Michinoku Pro M-12, an event promoted by Michinoku Pro Wrestling on February 19, 2006, where he competed in a 12-man battle royal to determine the #1 contender for the Tohoku Junior Heavyweight Championship also involving Taiji Ishimori, Kagetora, Rasse and others.

==== DDT Pro-Wrestling (2004–2007) ====
Moribe debuted in DDT Pro-Wrestling at DDT Non-Fix 10/20 from October 20, 2004, where he teamed up with Dick Togo and Sho Kanzaki to defeat Daichi Kakimoto, Futoshi Miwa and Sanshiro Takagi in a six-man tag team match. He made his last appearance for the promotion on August 9, 2007, at Beer Garden Fight 8.9 where he teamed up with Harashima to defeat Kudo and Yasu Urano.

Moribe is known for competing in the promotion's signature events such as DDT Judgement. He made his first appearance at DDT 8th Anniversary: Judgement 9 on March 27, 2005, where he alongside his "FEC" tag partner Tomohiko Hashimoto successfully defended the KO-D Tag Team Championship against Seiya Morohashi and Tanomusaku Toba. One year later at DDT 9th Anniversary: Judgement 10 on March 5, 2006, Moribe won the KO-D Tag Team Championship this time by teaming up with his trainer Dick Togo as part of the "Italian Four Horsemen" by defeating Daichi Kakimoto and Kota Ibushi.

==== Kaientai Dojo (2004–2006) ====
Moribe is known for his short lived tenure with Kaientai Dojo. He won the 2005 K-Metal League by competing against Masahiro Takanashi, Saburo Inematsu, Yusaku Obata, Taku Joetsu and Hajime Ishikawa in a block which he won with five points and by defeating Ishikawa on the finals from May 15, 2005. He marked his last appearance at a house show from January 3, 2006, he teamed up with Antonio Honda and Francesca Applenya in a losing effort to Kazma Sakamoto, Kengo Mashimo and Ryota Chikuzen.

=== (2014–present) ===
After a seven-year hiatus, Moribe returned to professional wrestling in 2014. At Ice Ribbon New Ice Ribbon #711, event promoted by Ice Ribbon on February 27, 2016, Moribe teamed up with Tetsuya Nakazato and Miyako Matsumoto in a losing effort to Aisawa NO. 1, Hayate and Misaki Ohata. On the first night of Kintaro Kanemura's Retirement Tour from June 19, 2016, promoted by Apache Pro-Wrestling Army, Moribe teamed up with Hayate to unsuccessfully challenge Hasegawa and Hi69 for the WEW World Tag Team Championship. At DSW Final, a show promoted by the Japanese independent scene on February 20, 2018, Moribe competed in a 28-person battle royal also involving notable opponents such as Mr. Gannosuke, Masashi Takeda, Poison Sawada Julie and others.

== Championships and accomplishments ==
- DDT Pro-Wrestling

- Ironman Heavymetalweight Championship (1 time)
- KO-D Tag Team Championship (2 times) – with Dick Togo (1) and Tomohiko Hashimoto (1)

- Kaientai Dojo

- K-Metal League 2005 (2005)

- Mobius

- Apex of Triangle Championship (2 times) – with Masao Orihara and El Jalapeño (2)

- World Entertainment Wrestling

- WEW Junior Heavyweight Championship (2 times)
- WEW World Tag Team Championship (2 times) – with Gentaro
