= Dai Suzuki =

Japanese professional wrestler (active 2014–2017)

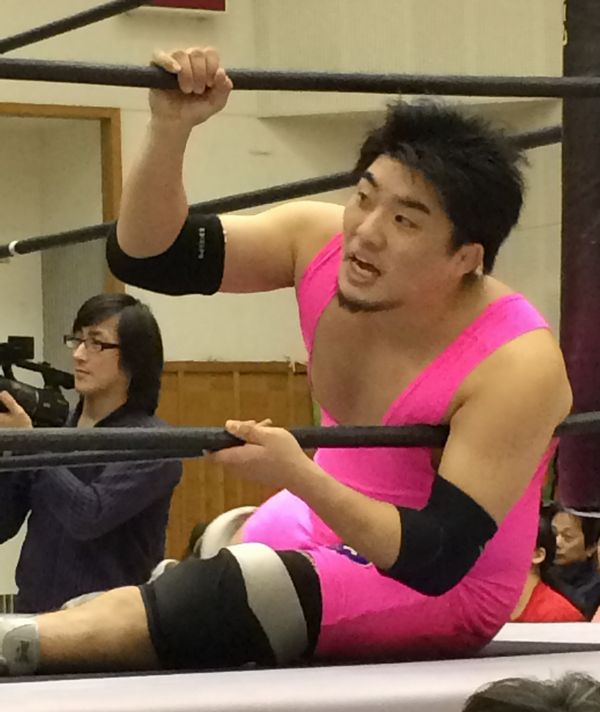
- Suzuki in January 2016

Personal information
- Born: January 19, 1990 (age 36) Nasushiobara, Japan

Professional wrestling career
- Ring name(s): Superman Taro; Dai Suzuki
- Billed height: 163 cm (5 ft 4 in)
- Billed weight: 80 kg (176 lb)
- Debut: 2013
- Retired: 2017

Dai Suzuki (鈴木大, Suzuki Dai) is a retired Japanese professional wrestler. He gained prominence in DDT Pro Wrestling and Pro Wrestling Freedoms.

== Professional wrestling career ==
=== Independent circuit (2013–2017) ===
Suzuki debuted at a Ryukyu Dragon Pro Wrestling house show on December 1, 2013, as Superman Taro, teaming with Churaumi Saver and Tida Heat in a six-man tag team match, losing to Fuma, Gurukun Mask, and Ryukyu-Dog Dingo.

==== DDT Pro-Wrestling (2014–2017) ====
Suzuki achieved recognition in DDT Pro Wrestling. On September 5, 2015, at DDT agePa!! 2015 (エイジパ!! 2015), he won a 13-man reverse battle royal, defeating Akito, Shunma Katsumata, Shigehiro Irie, Kazusada Higuchi, Makoto Oishi, and others. On December 4, 2016, at DDT Osaka Octopus 2016 (DDT大阪オクトパス2016), he competed in a gauntlet battle royal for the Ironman Heavymetalweight Championship, facing Kazuki Hirata, Kikutaro, Mad Paulie, Masahiro Takanashi, Toru Owashi, and others.

He participated in key DDT events, including DDT Peter Pan. At Ryōgoku Peter Pan 2017 on August 20, he lost to Gota Ihashi in a Casual Street Pro-Wrestling Extra Edition! match for the King of Dark Championship. In the DDT Judgement series, he debuted at Judgement 2016: DDT 19th Anniversary on March 21, teaming with DJ Nira to defeat Seiya Morohashi and Hoshitango in a tag team match for the King of Dark Championship, without winning the title. His final match, at Judgement 2017: DDT 20th Anniversary on March 20, saw him, Nobuhiro Shimatani, and Naomi Yoshimura defeat Rekka, Daiki Shimomura, and Yuki Ueno.

On November 12, 2017, DDT Pro Wrestling announced on Twitter that Suzuki retired to pursue a social welfare career. His retirement match at DDT DNA 39 (DNA39) on December 13, 2017, a three-on-one handicap match, ended in defeat against Ken Ohka, Ryota Nakatsu, and Kota Umeda.

== Personal life ==
Suzuki’s brother, Shin Suzuki, wrestles in Japan’s independent scene.

== Championships and accomplishments ==
- DDT Pro-Wrestling
  - King of Dark Championship (2 times)
  - Ironman Heavymetalweight Championship (1 time)
  - Wrestling Koshien Qualifying Tournament (2017)
