= Harashima =

Japanese professional wrestler (born 1974)

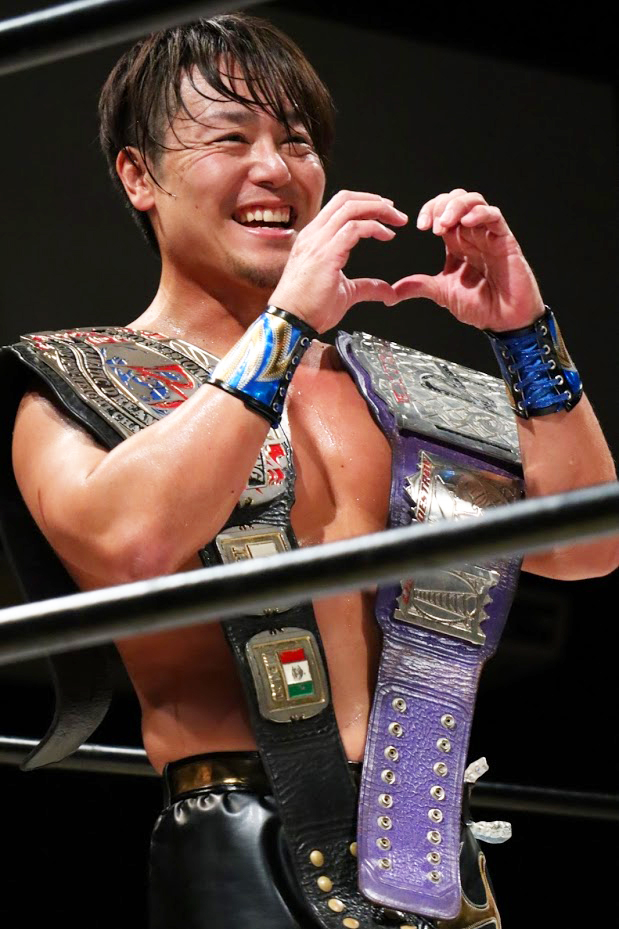
- Harashima in 2020

Personal information
- Born: July 6, 1974 (age 52) Tokyo, Japan

Professional wrestling career
- Ring names: Daisuke Kiso; Darkside Hero!; Hara Cena; Harashima; Hayabucha; Hero!; Jarashima; Konica Man; Somato
- Billed height: 1.78 m (5 ft 10 in)
- Billed weight: 90 kg (200 lb; 14 st)
- Debut: February 15, 2001

Harashima (stylised in all capital letters) (born July 6, 1974) is a Japanese professional wrestler. He is currently working in DDT Pro-Wrestling (formally Dramatic Dream Team), where he is a ten-time KO-D Openweight Champion and a former eleven-time KO-D Tag Team Champion.

== Professional wrestling career ==
=== Dramatic Dream Team/DDT Pro-Wrestling (2001–present) ===
==== Hero! (2001–2005) ====
After training in the Dramatic Dream Team dojo, Harashima made his professional wrestling debut in early 2001 as Konica Man and later became Hero! (stylised in all capital letters). Hero! challenged Asian Cougar for the Ironman Heavymetalweight Championship on several occasions in late 2001 but was unable to defeat him. Continuing in 2002, Hero! mainly worked on the under-card, often teaming with fellow masked wrestler Konica Man #2. On April 25, Konica Man #2, in storyline poisoned by Poison Sawada Julie, turned on Hero!, unmasked and renamed himself Toguro Habukage. The two men feuded, with Hero! attempting to remind his former partner who he truly was, culminating in a main event singles match on August 1 which Hero! won. On August 10, Hero! took on the man who poisoned his friend, Poison Sawada Julie, but lost. The storyline concluded in January 2003, when Hero!, supposedly on a business trip to Hong Kong, found Habukage disoriented and unable to remember anything from his past. On January 4, Hero! and the returning Habukage, now working under the name Kudo, defeated Takashi Sasaki and Thanomsak Toba. On June 15, 2003, Hero! won the Ironman Heavymetalweight Championship from O.K. Revolution and lost it to Shoichi Ichimiya during a tag match on July 24.

On December 29, the Hero! and Kudo ended the year by defeating Seiya Morohashi and Tomohiko Hashimoto, and Mikami and Onryo in a three-way Tables, Ladders, and Chairs match to win the KO-D Tag Team Championship. They went on to lose the KO-D Tag Team Championship to Gentaro and Takashi Sasaki on February 11, 2004. In May, Hero! entered the 2004 King of DDT tournament, beating one of the promotions' founder and top stars Sanshiro Takagi to make it to the finals, before losing to Poison Sawada Julie. Hero! quickly bounced back in Big Japan Pro Wrestling (BJW), winning a One Night Six Man Tag Tournament with Jaki Numazawa and Super-X on June 13. Back in DDT, Hero! and Kudo took part in the 2004 KO-D Tag League, eventually defeating Danshoku Dino and Glenn "Q" Spectre on September 30 to not only win the tournament, but to also regain the KO-D Tag Team Championship. However, Kudo's and Hero's second reign lasted just a month, before they were defeated by Seiya Morohashi and Thanomsak Toba on November 2. On November 8, Hero! debuted for New Japan Pro-Wrestling (NJPW), teaming with Kudo to defeat Kota Ibushi and Seiya Morohashi.

In 2005, Hero! turned heel, becoming Darkside Hero!, and aligned himself with Toru Owashi and Shogo Takagi. On August 7, Darkside Hero! and Owashi defeated Seiya Morohashi and Thanomsak Toba to win the KO-D Tag Team Championship, and lost the title's to Daichi Kakimoto and Kota Ibushi on November 23.

==== Disaster-Box (2006–2011) ====
In January 2006, Hero! unmasked and started wrestling under the name Harashima. Together with Owashi and Jet Shogo (formally Shogo Takagi), they formed the heel stable Disaster-Box. In October, Harashima left the stable after being dissatisfied with the achievements of stable leader Owashi. On December 29, Harashima beat Owashi for the KO-D Openweight Championship. In 2007, he defended his championship against Daichi Kakimoto on January 28, Danshoku Dino on February 25 and Sanshiro Takagi on April 1, before losing it to Koo on June 3. Harashima regained the KO-D Openweight Championship on October 21 and made one successful defence against Yasu Urano on March 9, 2008. He lost the championship to Dick Togo in a five-way match on May 6.

On June 1, Harashima defeated Poison Sawada Julie. At the following DDT show, Harashima, poisoned by Sawada, debuted as Jarashima, adopting a look and personality similar to Sawada. Calling themselves Jakai Tensho, they unsuccessfully challenged the Suicide Boyz (Mikami and Toba) for the KO-D Tag Team Championships on July 6. After the match, Jarashima drank an antidote to Sawada's poison, returning him to Harashima.

Harashima would reform Disaster-Box with Toru Owashi and on October 26, they won the KO-D Tag Team Championships by defeating Mikami and Thanomsak Toba. On November 30, Harashima and Owashi successfully defended their titles against Shuji Ishikawa and Sanshiro Takagi. On December 28, Harashima unsuccessfully challenged Takagi for the KO-D Openweight Championship. On January 24, 2009, Harashima and Owashi lost the KO-D Tag Team Championships to Kota Ibushi and Kenny Omega. At Judgement 2009, Harashima won a battle royal making him the number one contender for the KO-D Openweight Championship. On May 4, Harashima defeated Takagi to win his third KO-D Openweight Championship. At Ryōgoku Peter Pan 2009, DDT's first event at Sumo Hall, Harashima lost the KO-D Openweight Championship to Kota Ibushi when Ibushi debuted his new Phoenix-Plex finishing manoeuvre. The following year, on May 30, Harashima won the 2010 King of DDT which he used to challenge Daisuke Sekimoto for the KO-D Openweight Championship. At Ryōgoku Peter Pan 2010, Harashima won his fourth KO-D Openweight Championship. Harashima made two successful defence against Daisuke Sasaki on August 29 and Danshoku Dino on October 24, before losing the title to Hikaru Sato on November 14. In late 2010, Owashi announced his retirement from professional wrestling and that he would be leaving DDT at the end of the year. On December 26, Harashima, Owashi and Yukihiro Abe won the UWA World Trios Championship from Hikaru Sato, Michael Nakazawa and Tomomitsu Matsunaga. The trio would vacate the titles due to Owashi's retirement.

On February 27, 2011, Harashima unsuccessfully challenged Dick Togo for the KO-D Openweight Championship. On April 6, during a four way match against Antonio Honda, DJ Nira and Michael Nakazawa, Harashima was attacked by the three other wrestlers before being saved by his alter ego Hero!. On May 4, Harashima and Hero! unsuccessfully challenged KO-D Tag Team Champions Gentaro and Yasu Urano. On May 21, Harashima reached the finals of the 2011 King of DDT tournament but lost to his long time rival Kudo. On June 24, Harashima and Hero! won the KO-D Tag Team Championships from Kenny Omega and Michael Nakazawa. The duo would lose the titles to Daisuke Sekimoto and Masa Takanashi at Ryōgoku Peter Pan 2011. In August, Harashima's other alter ego, Darkside Hero!, debuted and turned on Harashima alongside Hero!. Harashima defeated both men in singles matches; Hero! on September 18 and Darkside Hero! on October 5. On November 27, Harashima unsuccessfully challenged Kudo for the KO-D Openweight Championship.

==== Smile Squash (2012–2018) ====
At Budokan Peter Pan: DDT 15th Anniversary, Harashima and NJPW's Togi Makabe defeated Shuji Ishikawa and BJW's Ryuji Ito. Afterwards, Harashima formed a new veteran stable with generational rivals Kudo and Yasu Urano to go after the villainous Team Drift (later Team Dream Futures) stable of Keisuke Ishii, Shigehiro Irie and Soma Takao. On September 30, the veterans, now known collectively as "Urashimakudo", defeated Team Drift in the first six-man tag team match between the two stables. In October, both Kudo and Urano were sidelined with injuries bringing the future of the stable into doubt, however, the stable was kept alive when Hiro Tsumaki joined the veteran stable on October 21 as a replacement for the injured members. On November 25, Jarashima returned for one night only as part of Poison Sawada Julie's retirement match. Urano returned in December and on January 6, 2013, Harashima and Urano defeated Mikami and Tatsumi Fujinami to win the KO-D Tag Team Championships. On January 27, Kudo announced that he was returning to the ring in February. This led Fuma (formally Hiro Tsumaki) announcing that the stable was now called Urashimafuma and he was a full-time member. However, Yasu Urano ended up turning on Fuma, kicking him out of the stable and welcoming Kudo back. After four successful title defences, Harashima and Urano lost the KO-D Tag Team Championships to Hikaru Sato and Yukio Sakaguchi. Harashima quickly bounced back from the title loss, winning the Hard Hit Grappling Tournament on May 19 and entered the 2013 King of DDT On July 7, Harashima defeated Kenny Omega in the finals of the tournament and earned the right to challenge the KO-D Openweight Champ, Team Dream Futures' Shigehiro Irie. On August 17, during the first day of DDT's 16th anniversary weekend at Ryōgoku Kokugikan, Urashimakudo lost to Team Dream Futures in a trios match. The following day, at Ryogoku Peter Pan 2013, Harashima won his fifth KO-D Openweight Championship. On October 20, Harashima won the Ironman Heavymetalweight Championship for the first time since 2002 whilst successfully defending his KO-D Openweight Championship against Danshoku Dino. On November 4, Harashima continued his dominance, defeating Antonio Honda for the DDT Extreme Championship., becoming a triple crown champion in the process. Harashima lost the Ironman Heavymetalweight Championship to Yukio Sakaguchi on December 12 but regained in on December 23 during a KO-D Openweight Championship defence. On December 31, Harashima finished his extremely successful year by winning Tenka Toitsu! 3 Organization Strongest Determination Tournament, a one night knock out style tournament put on by DDT, BJW and Kaientai Dojo. After losing the Ironman Heavymetalweight Championship to Masa Takanashi on January 13, 2014, Harashima successfully defended his KO-D Openweight Title against Takanashi on February 23. After the match, Kudo quit the Urashimakudo stable and challenged Harashima to a match for the KO-D Openweight Championship. On March 1, Harashima lost the DDT Extreme Championship to Danshoku Dino. Harashima's misery continued as at Judgement 2014, Kudo defeated Harashima to win the KO-D Openweight Championship.

In order to combat Kudo's new stable with Masa Takanashi and Yukio Sakaguchi, known as Shuten-dōji, Harashima and Urano formed Smile Squash with Akito. On May 25, Harashima won back the KO-D Openweight Championship from Kudo. At Ryōgoku Peter Pan 2014, Harashima made his third successful title defence in a three way against Kenny Omega and Isami Kodaka. Continuing into 2015, Harashima had made seven successful title defences before he lost the KO-D Openweight Championship to Kota Ibushi on February 15. He regained the title from Ibushi on April 29 for his seventh championship reign, surpassing Sanshiro Takagi's record of six, only to lose the title to Kudo on May 31. At Ryōgoku Peter Pan 2016, Harashima faced NJPW's top star Hiroshi Tanahashi in a losing effort. On September 8, Smile Squash unsuccessfully challenged Team Dream Futures for the KO-D Six Man Tag Team Championship. On October 25, Harashima unsuccessfully challenged Yukio Sakaguchi for the KO-D Openweight Championship. On November 17, Harashima was able to gain a measure of revenge over Tanahashi by defeating him in a tag team match, pinning Yohei Komatsu. On December 31, Harashima teamed with Yuko Miyamoto to take part in the 3 Organization Shuffle Tag Tournament and reached the finals before losing to Daisuke Sekimoto and Konosuke Takeshita. On February 28, 2016, Harashima became the number one contender for the KO-D Openweight Championship when he defeated Shigehiro Irie. At Judgement 2016: DDT 19th Anniversary, Harashima defeated Isami Kodaka for his eighth KO-D Openweight Championship reign. After making his first successful defence against Kazusada Higuchi, Harashima lost his KO-D Openweight Championship when Daisuke Sasaki cashed in his "Right to Challenge Anytime, Anywhere" contract. In the summer, Yuko Miyamoto joined Smile Squash, teaming with Harashima as Smile Yankees. At Ryōgoku Peter Pan 2016, Smile Yankees defeated Kai and Ken Ohka to win the KO-D Tag Team Championships. On September 25, Smile Yankees defeated Damnation's Daisuke Sasaki and Tetsuya Endo to make their first successful title defense of the KO-D Tag Team Championships. On October 9, Miyamoto and Harashima lost the KO-D Tag Team Championship in the second title defense to Sasaki and Endo in a rematch. After defeating Endo on October 23, Harashima would defeat Damnation's Shuji Ishikawa at Osaka Octopus 2016 for his ninth KO-D Openweight Championship. On January 29, 2017, Harashima successfully defended his title against the Damnation leader, Daisuke Sasaki. On February 12, Soma Takao joined Smile Squash whilst Akito would leave on March 25. At Judgement 2017: DDT 20th Anniversary, Harashima lost the title to Konosuke Takeshita.

In June, Harashima once again reached the finals of King of DDT Tournament but fell to Tetsuya Endo. At Ryōgoku Peter Pan 2017, Harashima teamed with Pro Wrestling Noah's Naomichi Marufuji to win the KO-D Tag Team Championship from Shigehiro Irie and Kazusada Higuchi. Going into 2018, HarashiMarufuji successfully defended their titles on four separate occasions. Harashima made the finals of the first D-Oh Grand Prix but lost to Shuji Ishikawa on January 28, 2018. At Judgement 2018: DDT 21st Anniversary, HarashiMarufuji lost their KO-D Tag Team Championship to Daisuke Sekimoto and Kazusada Higuchi. On April 29, Harashima faced his Smile Squash stablemate, Yuko Miyamoto, in a match for the DDT Extreme Championship. Harashima beat Miyamoto for the title but caused a massive rift in the stable, leading to both Miyamoto and Harashima's longtime ally, Yasu Urano, to leave the stable. On May 8, following a disqualification victory against Tetsuya Endo, Harashima's last ally Soma Takao turned on him and joined Damnation, dissolving Smile Squash once and for all.

==== Disaster-Box return (2018–present) ====
Harashima won the DDT Extreme Championship for the third time, when he defeated Shinya Aoki, but on April 28, 2019, he lost his title to Antonio Honda in a bra match. A few months later, Harashima became Extreme Champion once again, by defeating Jiro Kuroshio, and challenged Konosuke Takeshita for both the Openweight and Extreme Championships at Ultimate Party 2019 on November 3. At the event, Harashima became a double champion, by defeating Takeshita for the Openweight Championship. With the win, he also became the first wrestler to become a ten-time KO-D champion. On January 26, 2020, he was defeated by Masato Tanaka for the Openweight Championship, and on March 11, he was defeated by Aoki for the Extreme Championship.

== Championships and accomplishments ==
- Big Japan Pro Wrestling

- One Night Six Man Tag Tournament (2004) – with Jaki Numazawa and Super-X

- Dramatic Dream Team/DDT Pro-Wrestling

- DDT Extreme Championship (4 times)
- Ironman Heavymetalweight Championship (4 times)
- Jiyūgaoka 6-Person Tag Team Championship (2 times) – with Sanshiro Takagi and Etsuko Mita (1) and Muscle Sakai and Yusuke Inokuma (1)
- KO-D Openweight Championship (10 times)
- KO-D Tag Team Championship (12 times) – with Kudo (2), Toru Owashi (2), Hero! (1), Yasu Urano (1), Yuko Miyamoto (1), Naomichi Marufuji (1), Yuji Okabayashi (1), Naomi Yoshimura (2) and Chris Brookes (1)
- KO-D 6-Man Tag Team Championship (1 time) – with Akito and Yasu Urano
- UWA World Trios Championship (1 time) – with Toru Owashi and Yukihiro Abe
- Dramatic Sousenkyo (2016)
- Grappling Tournament (2013)
- KO-D Openweight Championship Contendership Tournament/King of DDT Tournament (2010, 2013)
- KO-D Tag League (2004) – with Kudo
- Right to Challenge Anytime Anywhere Contract (2013)
- Martial Arts Open Tournament (2019)
- Ultimate Tag League (2022) – with Naomi Yoshimura

- Japan Indie Awards

- MVP Award (2014)

- Pro Wrestling Illustrated

- Ranked No. 141 of the top 500 singles wrestlers in the PWI 500 in 2019

- Toshikoshi Puroresu

- Tenka Toitsu! 3 Organization Strongest Determination Tournament (2013)
- Toshiwasure! Shuffle Tag Tournament (2020) – with Yuji Okabayashi
- Forget The Year! Shuffle Six Man Tag Tournament (2021)– with Daichi Hashimoto and Kengo Mashimo
