= World Midbreath Championship =

Professional wrestling championship

World Jet Championship

Details
- Promotion: DDT Pro-Wrestling
- Date established: August 14, 2009
- Date retired: August 23, 2009 (unified with the DDT Extreme Championship)
Statistics
- First champion(s): Masa Takanashi
- Final champion(s): Danshoku Dino
- Most reigns: All title holders (1)
- Longest reign: Masa Takanashi (9 days)
- Shortest reign: Danshoku Dino (<1 days)

The World Midbreath Championship (世界ミッドブレス級王座, Sekai Middoburesu-kyū Ōza) is an inactive professional wrestling championship in the Japanese promotion DDT Pro-Wrestling. The title was established in 2009 during a match that took place in the Midbreath gym located in Yotsuya, Tokyo.

== Title history ==
Key
No.	Overall reign number
Reign	Reign number for the specific champion
Days	Number of days held
Defenses	Number of successful defenses

No.	Champion	Championship change			Reign statistics			Notes	Ref.
No.	Champion	Date	Event	Location	Reign	Days	Defenses	Notes	Ref.
1	Masa Takanashi	August 14, 2009	Dramatic Dream Talk	Tokyo, Japan	1	9	0	Defeated Mr. Protein to win the inaugural title.	
2	Danshoku Dino	August 23, 2009	Ryōgoku Peter Pan	Tokyo, Japan	1	<1	0	Dino defended the DDT Extreme Championship, the World Ōmori Championship, the Greater China Unified Sichuan Openweight Championship, the Umemura PC Juku Copy & Paste Championship and the DJ Nira World Championship.	
—	Unified	August 23, 2009	—	—	—	—	—	The title was unified with the DDT Extreme Championship.	

== See also ==
- DDT Pro-Wrestling
- Professional wrestling in Japan
