= GAY World Anal Championship =

Professional wrestling championship

- The GAY World Anal Championship belt

Details
- Promotion: DDT Pro-Wrestling
- Date established: 2005
- Date retired: 2010
Statistics
- First champion: Takao Omori
- Final champion: Danshoku Dino
- Most reigns: Danshoku Dino (2 reigns)
- Longest reign: Men's Teioh (799 days)

The GAY (Get Asshole Yours) World Anal Championship (Japanese: GAY世界アナル級王座, Hepburn: GAY Sekai Anaru-kyū Ōza) is an inactive professional wrestling championship in the Japanese promotion DDT Pro-Wrestling. The title was established in 2005 when Takao Omori defeated Danshoku Dino on the first day of the Pro Wrestling Zero1-Max Survivar 72H tour to win the title.

== Title history ==
Key
No.	Overall reign number
Reign	Reign number for the specific champion
Days	Number of days held
Defenses	Number of successful defenses
N/A	Unknown information
(NET)	Championship change took place "no earlier than" the date listed
<1	Reign lasted less than a day

No.	Champion	Championship change			Reign statistics			Notes	Ref.
No.	Champion	Date	Event	Location	Reign	Days	Defenses	Notes	Ref.
1	Takao Omori	June 17, 2005	Survivar 72H Opening Day	Tokyo, Japan	1	<1	0	Defeated Danshoku Dino to win the inaugural title. This was a Pro Wrestling Zero1-Max event.	
—	Vacated	June 17, 2005	Survivar 72H Opening Day	Tokyo, Japan	—	—	—	Omori vacated the title immediately after winning it.	
2	Danshoku Dino	March 5, 2006	DDT 9th Anniversary: Judgement 10	Tokyo, Japan	1	455	1	Defeated Muscle Sakai to win the vacant title.	
3	Men's Teioh	June 3, 2007	King of DDT 2007	Tokyo, Japan	1	799	1		
4	Masa Takanashi	August 10, 2009	House show	N/A	1	13	0		
5	Danshoku Dino	August 23, 2009	Ryōgoku Peter Pan	Tokyo, Japan	2	308	1	Dino defended the DDT Extreme Championship, the World Ōmori Championship, the Greater China Unified Sichuan Openweight Championship, the Umemura PC Juku Copy & Paste Championship and the DJ Nira World Championship.	
—	Deactivated	June 27, 2010 (NET)	—	—	—	—	—	Danshoku Dino only defended the title once during this reign, against Antonio Honda. After this, the title was never mentioned again without being officially deactivated.	

== Combined reigns ==
¤	The exact length of at least one title reign is uncertain, so the shortest possible length is used.

Rank	Wrestler	No. of reigns	Combined defenses	Combined days
1	Men's Teioh	1	1	799
2	Danshoku Dino	2	2	763¤
3	Masa Takanashi	1	0	13
4	Takao Omori	1	0	<1

== See also ==
- DDT Pro-Wrestling
- Professional wrestling in Japan
