= JET World Jet Championship =

Professional wrestling championship

Details
- Promotion: DDT Pro-Wrestling
- Date established: 2006
- Date retired: August 23, 2009 (unified with the DDT Extreme Championship)
Statistics
- First champion: "Jet" Shogo
- Final champion: Danshoku Dino
- Most reigns: All title holders (1)
- Longest reign: "Jet" Shogo (1,193 days)
- Shortest reign: Danshoku Dino (<1 days)

The JET World Jet Championship (JET世界ジェット級王座, JET sekai jetto-kyū ōza) is an inactive professional wrestling championship in the Japanese promotion DDT Pro-Wrestling. The title was established in 2006. Contestants for the title usually wore gear and used entrance themes inspired by Pride Fighting Championship. They also integrated the word "jet" in their ring name.

== Title history ==
Key
No.	Overall reign number
Reign	Reign number for the specific champion
Days	Number of days held
Defenses	Number of successful defenses
<1	Reign lasted less than a day

No.	Champion	Championship change			Reign statistics			Notes	Ref.
No.	Champion	Date	Event	Location	Reign	Days	Defenses	Notes	Ref.
1	"Jet" Shogo	May 4, 2006	Max Bump 2006	Tokyo, Japan	1	1,193	1	Won a Rumble rules match to win the inaugural title.	
2	Masa Takanashi	August 9, 2009	Beer Garden Pro-Wrestling	Tokyo, Japan	1	14	0	Takanashi was awarded the title by Shogo when he visited him in his home.	
3	Danshoku Dino	August 23, 2009	Ryōgoku Peter Pan	Tokyo, Japan	1	<1	0	Dino defended the DDT Extreme Championship, the World Ōmori Championship, the Greater China Unified Sichuan Openweight Championship, the Umemura PC Juku Copy & Paste Championship and the DJ Nira World Championship.	
—	Unified	August 23, 2009	—	—	—	—	—	The title was unified with the DDT Extreme Championship.	

== See also ==
- DDT Pro-Wrestling
- Professional wrestling in Japan
