= King of DDT Tournament =

DDT Pro-Wrestling event series

- King of DDT trophy
- Promotions: CyberFight
- Brands: DDT
- First event: King of DDT (2004)
- Event gimmick: Single-elimination tournament for a championship match

The King of DDT Tournament (Japanese: KING OF DDTトーナメント, Hepburn: Kingu Obu Dī Dī Tī Tōnamento) is an annual single elimination professional wrestling tournament held by CyberFight's DDT Pro-Wrestling brand.

Though DDT also ran the annual D-Oh Grand Prix tournament between 2018 and 2023, the King of DDT is different in that it is single-elimination, whereas the D-Oh Grand Prix was a round-robin. Since the 2009 edition, the winner of the tournament, like with the D-Oh Grand Prix, would receive a championship match for the KO-D Openweight Championship.

The number of participants in the King of DDT has varied over the years, from a lowest of 8 in 2005 to a highest of 32 in 2018. Poison Sawada Julie is the inaugural winner of the tournament; Kudo, Harashima, Tetsuya Endo, Konosuke Takeshita and Kazusada Higuchi are the only two-time winners.

== History ==
On April 29, 2001, Mikami won the Take The Royal Tournament that ran over the two DDT Golden Jack events held on that day. For his victory, he was awarded a crown by Commissioner Yamamo, symbolically crowning him "King of DDT". This precursor tournament was acknowledged in the build-up to the inaugural King of DDT Tournament in 2004.

After the first two editions in 2004 and 2005, DDT produced four annual King of DDT events from 2006 to 2009 which featured no tournament. The tournament returned in 2009 as the KO-D Openweight Championship Contendership Tournament, held over two Dramatic Next Door events on June 7 and one final event on July 10. In 2010, the tournament was held over two King of DDT 2010 events held on May 23 and May 30, in Osaka and Tokyo respectively. In 2011, the tournament reverted to its original name.

Until 2020, the KO-D Openweight Champion at the time of the tournament did not participate and, since 2018, neither do the Right to Challenge Anytime Anywhere Contract holders. In 2022, champion Tetsuya Endo had to vacate the title two days before the start of the tournament after he suffered a legitimate concussion. It was then announced that, instead of receiving a shot at the title, the winner of this edition would be directly crowned champion.

== Tournament finals ==
Ed.	Event	Date	City	Venue	Attendance	Final	Ref.
1	King of DDT 2004 2nd Day	May 30, 2004	Tokyo	Kitazawa Town Hall	297	Hero! vs. Poison Sawada Julie	
2	King of DDT 2005	May 29, 2005	Tokyo	Shin-Kiba 1st Ring	462	Kudo vs. Daichi Kakimoto	
3	Sanshiro Takagi vs. Kota Ibushi One Match Show	July 10, 2009	Tokyo	Shin-Kiba 1st Ring	394	Sanshiro Takagi vs. Kota Ibushi	
4	King of DDT 2010 in Tokyo	May 30, 2010	Tokyo	Shin-Kiba 1st Ring	354	Mikami vs. Harashima	
5	King of DDT Kyoto	May 29, 2011	Kyoto	KBS Hall	512	Kudo vs. Harashima	
6	King of DDT Osaka	July 8, 2012	Osaka	Osaka City Yodogawa Citizens Center	377	Kenny Omega vs. Danshoku Dino	
7	King of DDT Osaka 2013	July 7, 2013	Osaka	Nasci Hall Umeda	350	Kenny Omega vs. Harashima	
8	King of DDT 2014	June 29, 2014	Tokyo	Korakuen Hall	2,000	Kudo vs. Isami Kodaka	
9	King of DDT 2015 Tokyo	June 28, 2015	Tokyo	Korakuen Hall	2,200	Yukio Sakaguchi vs. Konosuke Takeshita	
10	King of DDT 2016 Tokyo	June 26, 2016	Tokyo	Korakuen Hall	1,691	Shuji Ishikawa vs. Tetsuya Endo	
11	King of DDT 2017 Final Round	June 25, 2017	Tokyo	Korakuen Hall	1,333	Tetsuya Endo vs. Harashima	
12	King of DDT 2018 Final Round	August 26, 2018	Tokyo	Korakuen Hall	1,033	Daisuke Sasaki vs. Tetsuya Endo	
13	King of DDT 2019 the Final!!	May 19, 2019	Tokyo	Korakuen Hall	979	Soma Takao vs. Konosuke Takeshita	
14	King of DDT 2020 Final!!	August 23, 2020	Tokyo	Korakuen Hall	N/A	T-Hawk vs. Tetsuya Endo	
15	King of DDT 2021 Final!!	July 4, 2021	Tokyo	Korakuen Hall	621	Yuji Hino vs. Konosuke Takeshita	
16	King of DDT 2022 Final!!	July 3, 2022	Tokyo	Korakuen Hall	703	Kazusada Higuchi vs. Naomi Yoshimura	
17	King of DDT 2023 Final!!	May 21, 2023	Tokyo	Korakuen Hall	677	Kazusada Higuchi vs. Chris Brookes	
18	King of DDT: 20th Anniversary Final!!	May 26, 2024	Tokyo	Korakuen Hall	1,005	Mao vs. Daisuke Sasaki	
19	King of DDT 2025 Final!!	May 25, 2025	Tokyo	Korakuen Hall	N/A	Kazusada Higuchi vs. Kanon	
20	King of DDT 2026 Final!!	May 31, 2026	Tokyo	Korakuen Hall	N/A	Mao vs. Shinya Aoki	

== Tournaments ==
Tournament				Aftermath	
Year	Winner	Won	Participants	KO-D Openweight Championship match	Result
2004	Poison Sawada Julie	1	16	Not held (Note: The KO-D Openweight Championship title shot was introduced in 2009.)	
2005	Kudo	1	8	Not held	
2009	Kota Ibushi	1	16	vs. Harashima on August 23, 2009, at Ryōgoku Peter Pan	Won
2010	Harashima	1	16	vs. Daisuke Sekimoto on July 25, 2010, at Ryōgoku Peter Pan 2010	Won
2011	Kudo	2	16	vs. Shuji Ishikawa on July 24, 2011, at Ryōgoku Peter Pan 2011	Won
2012	Kenny Omega	1	16	vs. Kota Ibushi on August 18, 2012, at Budokan Peter Pan	Lost
2013	Harashima	2	16	vs. Shigehiro Irie on August 18, 2013, at Ryōgoku Peter Pan 2013	Won
2014	Isami Kodaka	1	16	vs. Harashima (c) and Kenny Omega on August 17, 2014, at Ryōgoku Peter Pan 2014	Lost
2015	Yukio Sakaguchi	1	16	vs. Kudo on August 23, 2015, at Ryōgoku Peter Pan 2015	Won
2016	Shuji Ishikawa	1	16	vs. Konosuke Takeshita on August 28, 2016, at Ryōgoku Peter Pan 2016	Won
2017	Tetsuya Endo	1	16	vs. Konosuke Takeshita on August 20, 2017, at Ryōgoku Peter Pan 2017	Lost
2018	Daisuke Sasaki	1	32	vs. Danshoku Dino on October 21, 2018, at Ryōgoku Peter Pan 2018	Won
2019	Konosuke Takeshita	1	14	vs. Tetsuya Endo on July 15, 2019, at Wrestle Peter Pan 2019	Won
2020	Tetsuya Endo	2	28	vs. Daisuke Sasaki (Note: Because Tetsuya Endo was already the champion when he won the 2020 tournament, he was allowed to choose his own challenger.) on June 7, 2020, at Ultimate Party 2020	Won
2021	Konosuke Takeshita	2	16	vs. Jun Akiyama on August 21, 2021, at Wrestle Peter Pan 2021	Won
2022	Kazusada Higuchi	1	16	Not held (Note: Because Tetsuya Endo vacated the title two days before the tournament began, the tournament winner was crowned champion immediately instead.)	
2023	Chris Brookes	1	16	vs. Yuji Hino on July 23, 2023, at Wrestle Peter Pan 2023	Won
2024	Mao	1	16	vs. Yuki Ueno on July 21, 2024, at Wrestle Peter Pan 2024	Lost
2025	Kazusada Higuchi	2	16	vs. Chris Brookes on June 29, 2025, at King of Kings	Won
2026	Shinya Aoki	1	16	vs. Yuki Ueno on June 28, 2026, at King of Kings 2026	Lost

== Results ==
=== 2004 ===
King of DDT 2004
- Promotion: DDT
- Date: May 29–30, 2004
- City: Tokyo, Japan
- Venue: Kitazawa Town Hall

King of DDT Tournament chronology
← Previous —	Next → 2005

The 2004 King of DDT Tournament was held from May 29 to May 30.

Round 1 May 29	Round 2 May 30
Sanshiro Takagi	Pin
Mikami	15:21
Sanshiro Takagi	Pin
Gentaro	3:18
Daichi Kakimoto	Pin
Gentaro	8:50
Block A
Futoshi Miwa	Pin
Thanomsak Toba	4:00
Futoshi Miwa	Pin
Hero!	2:33
Takashi Sasaki	Pin
Hero!	8:09
Poison Sawada Julie	Pin
Seiya Morohashi	11:59
Poison Sawada Julie	Sub
Tomohiko Hashimoto	7:02
Kenshin	Sub
Tomohiko Hashimoto	7:38
Block B
Masahiro Takanashi	Pin
Shoichi Ichimiya	6:01
Masahiro Takanashi	Pin
Danshoku Dino	4:02
Kudo	Pin
Danshoku Dino	9:50

Semifinals; May 30
Sanshiro Takagi	Pin
Hero!	0:38
Poison Sawada Julie	Pin
Danshoku Dino	7:01

Final; May 30
Hero!	Pin
Poison Sawada Julie	10:18

=== 2005 ===
King of DDT 2005
- Promotion: DDT
- Date: May 22–29, 2005
- City: Various; Final: Tokyo, Japan
- Venue: Various; Final: Shin-Kiba 1st Ring

King of DDT Tournament chronology
← Previous; 2004	Next → 2009

The 2005 King of DDT Tournament was held from May 22 to May 29 and featured only eight participants. On the first day of the tournament, Yusuke Inokuma defeated Jun Inomata and Yoshihiko in a qualifying match to earn a spot in the tournament.

First round May 22
Kudo	Pin
Kenshin	7:05
Hero!	Pin
Yusuke Inokuma	1:36
Kota Ibushi	Pin
Shuji Ishikawa	10:32
Masa Takanashi	Pin
Daichi Kakimoto	7:53

Semifinals; May 29
Kudo	Pin
Yusuke Inokuma	6:06
Kota Ibushi	Pin
Daichi Kakimoto	7:03

Final; May 29
Kudo	Pin
Daichi Kakimoto	10:40

=== 2009 ===
KO-D Openweight Championship Contendership Tournament
- Promotion: DDT
- Date: June 7 – July 10, 2009
- City: Tokyo, Japan
- Venue: Shin-Kiba 1st Ring

King of DDT Tournament chronology
← Previous; 2005	Next → 2010

The 2009 KO-D Openweight Championship Contendership Tournament ran from June 7 to July 10. Kota Ibushi, the winner of the tournament, went on to defeat Harashima for the championship on August 23, beginning his first reign with the title.

Round 1 June 7
Kota Ibushi	Pin
Danshoku Dino	10:54
Hikaru Sato	Pin
Antonio Honda	9:45
Yasu Urano	Pin
Tomomitsu Matsunaga	8:53
Michael Nakazawa	Pin
Gentaro	15:28
Masa Takanashi	Pin
Toru Owashi	3:50
Mikami	Pin
Madoka	5:10
Hoshitango	Pin
Sasaki & Gabbana	4:42
Poison Sawada Julie	Pin
Sanshiro Takagi	6:16

Round 2 June 7
Kota Ibushi	Pin
Antonio Honda	11:14
Yasu Urano	Pin
Gentaro	6:07
Masa Takanashi	Pin
Madoka	10:07
Hoshitango	Pin
Sanshiro Takagi	7:54

Semifinals; June 7
Kota Ibushi	Pin
Gentaro	20:09
Masa Takanashi	Pin
Sanshiro Takagi	10:21

Final; July 10
Kota Ibushi	Pin
Sanshiro Takagi	31:53

=== 2010 ===
KO-D Openweight Championship Contendership Tournament
- Promotion: DDT
- Date: May 23–30, 2010
- City: Various; Final: Tokyo, Japan
- Venue: Various; Final: Shin-Kiba 1st Ring

King of DDT Tournament chronology
← Previous; 2009	Next → 2011

The 2010 KO-D Openweight Championship Contendership Tournament ran from May 23 to May 30. Harashima, the winner of the tournament, went on to defeat Daisuke Sekimoto for the championship on July 25, beginning his fourth reign with the title.

Round 1 May 23
Harashima	Sub
Muscle Sakai	9:02
Yukihiro Abe	Pin
Michael Nakazawa	5:02
Yago Aznable	Sub
Sanshiro Takagi	11:47
Thanomsak Toba	Sub
Keisuke Ishii	7:52
Toru Owashi	Pin
Daisuke Sasaki	10:47
Hoshitango	Pin
Kudo	8:41
Hikaru Sato	Sub
Yasu Urano	11:37
Antonio Honda	Pin
Mikami	14:13

Round 2 May 30
Harashima	Pin
Michael Nakazawa	7:02
Yago Aznable	Pin
Keisuke Ishii	3:22
Toru Owashi	Sub
Kudo	3:47
Hikaru Sato	Pin
Mikami	6:15

Semifinals; May 30
Harashima	Pin
Keisuke Ishii	9:43
Toru Owashi	Pin
Mikami	2:35

Final; May 30
Harashima	Sub
Mikami	11:28

=== 2011 ===
King of DDT 2011
- Promotion: DDT
- Date: May 21–29, 2011
- City: Various; Final: Kyoto, Japan
- Venue: Various; Final: KBS Hall

King of DDT Tournament chronology
← Previous; 2010	Next → 2012

In 2011, the tournament reverted to the "King of DDT Tournament" name and ran from May 21 to May 29. Kudo, the winner of the tournament, became the first two-time winner and went on to defeat Shuji Ishikawa for the championship on July 24, beginning his first reign with the title.

Round 1 May 21
Kudo	Pin
Yasu Urano	16:48
Tomomitsu Matsunaga	Sub
Hikaru Sato	8:57
Seiya Morohashi	Pin
Antonio Honda	6:50
Makoto Oishi	Pin
Kenny Omega	4:42
Shigehiro Irie	Pin
Keisuke Ishii	4:05
Michael Nakazawa	Pin
Kota Ibushi	9:51
Super Shit Machine	Pin
Daisuke Sasaki	7:24
Mikami	Pin
Harashima	9:07

Round 2 May 21
Kudo	Pin
Hikaru Sato	17:12
Seiya Morohashi	Pin
Kenny Omega	9:12
Shigehiro Irie	Pin
Kota Ibushi	8:02
Super Shit Machine	Pin
Harashima	4:38

Semifinals; May 29
Kudo	Pin
Kenny Omega	13:53
Shigehiro Irie	Pin
Harashima	9:24

Final; May 29
Kudo	Pin
Harashima	18:07

=== 2012 ===
King of DDT 2012
- Promotion: DDT
- Date: June 30 – July 8, 2012
- City: Various; Final: Osaka, Japan
- Venue: Various; Final: Osaka City Yodogawa Citizens Center

King of DDT Tournament chronology
← Previous; 2011	Next → 2013

The 2012 King of DDT Tournament ran from June 30 to July 8. Kenny Omega became the first non-Japanese to win the King of DDT Tournament and went on to fail in his challenge against KO-D Openweight Champion Kota Ibushi on August 18.

Round 1 June 30
Masa Takanashi	Pin
Tomomitsu Matsunaga	4:02
Daisuke Sasaki	Pin
Kenny Omega	15:05
Hikaru Sato	Sub
Michael Nakazawa	4:58
Shigehiro Irie	Pin
Harashima	6:37
Keisuke Ishii	Pin
Soma Takao	6:24
Antonio Honda	Pin
Kudo	11:43
Yasu Urano	Pin
Makoto Oishi	1:04
Akito	Sub
Danshoku Dino	11:38

Round 2 June 30
Masa Takanashi	Pin
Kenny Omega	7:02
Hikaru Sato	Pin
Harashima	19:49
Keisuke Ishii	Pin
Kudo	8:21
Yasu Urano	Pin
Danshoku Dino	17:53

Semifinals; July 8
Kenny Omega	Pin
Harashima	15:37
Kudo	Pin
Danshoku Dino	14:35

Final; July 8
Kenny Omega	Pin
Danshoku Dino	20:18

=== 2013 ===
King of DDT 2013
- Promotion: DDT
- Date: June 28 – July 7, 2013
- City: Various; Final: Osaka, Japan
- Venue: Various; Final: Nasci Hall Umeda

King of DDT Tournament chronology
← Previous; 2012	Next → 2014

The 2013 King of DDT Tournament ran from June 28 to July 7. Harashima, the winner of the tournament became the second two-time winner and went on to defeat Shigehiro Irie for the championship on August 18, beginning his fifth reign with the title.

Round 1 June 28
Mikami	Pin
Kenny Omega	11:10
Block A
Daisuke Sasaki	Pin
Soma Takao	3:47
Antonio Honda	Sub
Makoto Oishi	10:13
Block C
Danshoku Dino	Sub
Yukio Sakaguchi	9:15
Konosuke Takeshita	Pin
Masa Takanashi	5:43
Block B
Kota Ibushi	Pin
Yasu Urano	11:26
Hikaru Sato	Pin
Akito	10:11
Block D
Harashima	Pin
Kudo	13:44

Round 2 July 6
Kenny Omega	Pin
Daisuke Sasaki	16:50
Antonio Honda	Sub
Yukio Sakaguchi	11:08
Konosuke Takeshita	Pin
Yasu Urano	9:52
Hikaru Sato	Pin
Harashima	15:56

Semifinals; July 7
Kenny Omega	Pin
Yukio Sakaguchi	9:59
Konosuke Takeshita	Pin
Harashima	10:09

Final; July 7
Kenny Omega	Pin
Harashima	15:20

=== 2014 ===
King of DDT 2014
- Promotion: DDT
- Date: June 14–29, 2014
- City: Various; Final: Tokyo, Japan
- Venue: Various; Final: Korakuen Hall

King of DDT Tournament chronology
← Previous; 2013	Next → 2015

The 2014 King of DDT Tournament ran from June 14 to June 29. Isami Kodaka, the winner of the tournament went on to fail in his three-way challenge against Kenny Omega and KO-D Openweight Champion Harashima on August 17.

Round 1 June 14
Shigehiro Irie	Pin
Soma Takao	10:13
Yasu Urano	Pin
Antonio Honda	2:25
Tomomitsu Matsunaga	Pin
Kenny Omega	11:41
Mikami	Pin
Kudo	2:25
Isami Kodaka	Pin
Yukio Sakaguchi	10:07
Daisuke Sasaki	Pin
Konosuke Takeshita	17:16
Masa Takanashi	Pin
Danshoku Dino	9:38
Keisuke Ishii	Pin
Kota Ibushi	7:53

Round 2 June 15
Shigehiro Irie	Pin
Antonio Honda	14:56
Tomomitsu Matsunaga	Pin
Kudo	16:11
Isami Kodaka	Pin
Konosuke Takeshita	20:05
Masa Takanashi	Pin
Kota Ibushi	12:53

Semifinals; June 29
Shigehiro Irie	Pin
Kudo	12:40
Isami Kodaka	Pin
Kota Ibushi	11:03

Final; June 29
Kudo	Pin
Isami Kodaka	16:06

=== 2015 ===
King of DDT 2015
- Promotion: DDT
- Date: June 6–28, 2015
- City: Various; Final: Tokyo, Japan
- Venue: Various; Final: Korakuen Hall

King of DDT Tournament chronology
← Previous; 2014	Next → 2016

The 2015 King of DDT Tournament ran from June 6 to June 28, covering three shows. Yukio Sakaguchi, the winner of the tournament went on to defeat Kudo for the championship on August 23, beginning his first reign with the title.

Round 1 June 6
Yukio Sakaguchi	Pin
Keisuke Ishii	10:03
Hiroshi Fukuda	Pin
Makoto Oishi	6:54
Shigehiro Irie	Pin
Yasu Urano	24:44
Tomomitsu Matsunaga	Pin
Kazusada Higuchi	11:04
Masa Takanashi	Pin
Akito	1:13
Antonio Honda	Pin
Konosuke Takeshita	15:15
Daisuke Sasaki	Sub
Kota Umeda	13:00
Kazuki Hirata	Pin
Kota Ibushi	7:31

Round 2 June 14
Yukio Sakaguchi	Pin
Makoto Oishi	7:19
Shigehiro Irie	Pin
Kazusada Higuchi	18:23
Masa Takanashi	Pin
Konosuke Takeshita	9:47
Daisuke Sasaki	Pin
Kota Ibushi	18:48

Semifinals; June 28
Yukio Sakaguchi	Sub
Kazusada Higuchi	9:43
Konosuke Takeshita	Pin
Daisuke Sasaki	14:16

Final; June 28
Yukio Sakaguchi	Pin
Konosuke Takeshita	18:13

=== 2016 ===
King of DDT 2016
- Promotion: DDT
- Date: June 5–26, 2016
- City: Various; Final: Tokyo, Japan
- Venue: Various; Final: Korakuen Hall
- Tagline: Who will stand in the main event at Ryōgoku Kokugikan? (Note: Japanese: 両国国技館のメインイベントに立つのは誰だ？, Hepburn: Ryōgoku Kokugikan no mein ibento ni tatsu no wa dare da?)

King of DDT Tournament chronology
← Previous; 2015	Next → 2017

The 2016 King of DDT Tournament ran from June 5 to June 26. Akito was originally scheduled to compete but had to withdraw on May 30, after suffering two broken ribs. He was replaced by Shunma Katsumata who defeated Kouki Iwasaki in a qualifying match on June 4. Shuji Ishikawa, the winner of the tournament went on to defeat Konosuke Takeshita for the championship on August 28, beginning his fourth reign.

Round 1 June 5
Mad Paulie	12:01
Tetsuya Endo	Pin
Kazuki Hirata	Pin
Shunma Katsumata	5:29
Soma Takao	Pin
Keisuke Ishii	11:19
Shuji Ishikawa	Pin
Kota Umeda	10:17
Antonio Honda	14:11
Kenso	Pin
Masa Takanashi	6:58
Harashima	Sub
Yasu Urano	16:23
Kazusada Higuchi	Pin
Shigehiro Irie	Pin
Yukio Sakaguchi	16:34

Round 2 June 12
Tetsuya Endo	Pin
Kazuki Hirata	10:11
Soma Takao	16:07
Shuji Ishikawa	Pin
Kenso	16:06
Harashima	Pin
Kazusada Higuchi	15:50
Shigehiro Irie	Sub

Semifinals (Note: Semifinalists were randomly shuffled.); June 26
Shigehiro Irie	15:50
Shuji Ishikawa	Pin
Tetsuya Endo	Pin
Harashima	7:15

Final; June 26
Shuji Ishikawa	Pin
Tetsuya Endo	23:52

=== 2017 ===
King of DDT 2017
- Promotion: DDT
- Date: June 2–25, 2017
- City: Tokyo, Japan
- Venue: Various; Final: Korakuen Hall
- Tagline: Who on earth is going to headline Ryōgoku this summer? (Note: Japanese: 夏の両国、メインに立つのは一体誰だ？, Hepburn: Natsu no Ryōgoku, mein ni tatsu no wa ittai dare da?)

King of DDT Tournament chronology
← Previous; 2016	Next → 2018

The 2017 King of DDT Tournament ran from June 2 to June 25. Kazuki Hirata competed under the ring name of "Hirata Collection A.T.", a parody of Milano Collection A.T. Tetsuya Endo, the winner of the tournament went on to fail in his challenge against KO-D Openweight Champion Konosuke Takeshita on August 20.

Round 1 June 2
Daisuke Sasaki	6:14
Akito	Pin
Masahiro Takanashi	Pin
Hirata Collection A.T.	8:02
Kudo	Pin
Soma Takao	8:30
Tetsuya Endo	Pin
Mike Bailey	16:00
Shunma Katsumata	7:42
Yukio Sakaguchi	Pin
Kazusada Higuchi	11:24
Harashima	Pin
Danshoku Dino	10:47
Keisuke Ishii	Pin
Shigehiro Irie	Pin
Mad Paulie	11:45

Round 2 June 4
Akito	Pin
Masahiro Takanashi	5:04
Kudo	14:16
Tetsuya Endo	Pin
Yukio Sakaguchi	15:50
Harashima	Sub
Keisuke Ishii	14:32
Shigehiro Irie	Pin

Semifinals; June 25
Akito	11:30
Tetsuya Endo	Pin
Harashima	Sub
Shigehiro Irie	2:47

Final; June 25
Tetsuya Endo	Pin
Harashima	22:08

=== 2018 ===
King of DDT 2018
- Promotion: DDT
- Date: July 31 – August 26, 2018
- City: Tokyo, Japan
- Venue: Various; Final: Korakuen Hall

King of DDT Tournament chronology
← Previous; 2017	Next → 2019

The 2018 King of DDT Tournament ran from July 31 to August 26. Instead of the usual 16 participants, this edition featured 32 participants. On July 23, it was announced a lottery would shuffle the final eight into new matches. Three days later, it was announced that Daiki Shimomura would be pulled out of the tournament after injuring his left MCL; he was replaced by Saki Akai. Six days later, Konosuke Takeshita pulled out of the tournament after suffering a shoulder injury and was replaced by Kazuki Hirata. Daisuke Sasaki, the winner of the tournament went on to defeat Danshoku Dino for the championship on October 21.

Round 1 July 31
Kudo	7:24
Akito	Pin
Gota Ihashi	4:05
Keisuke Ishii	Pin
Mike Bailey	Pin
Nobuhiro Shimatani	5:54
Shunma Katsumata	Pin
Alex Ace	7:21
Hoshitango	3:10
Yukio Sakaguchi	Sub
Soma Takao	Pin
Yuki Iino	4:36
Toru Owashi	Pin
Mizuki Watase	6:52
Mad Paulie	11:20
Harashima	Pin
Sanshiro Takagi	14:53
Mao	Pin
Saki Akai	7:30
Masahiro Takanashi	Pin
Tetsuya Endo	Sub
Gorgeous Matsuno	8:20
Tomomitsu Matsunaga	9:11
Kazusada Higuchi	Pin
Kouki Iwasaki	6:23
Antonio Honda	Pin
Daisuke Sasaki	Sub
Jason Kincaid	10:47
Yuki Ueno	6:30
Thanomsak Toba	TKO
Naomi Yoshimura	8:59
Kazuki Hirata	Pin

Round 2 August 4
Akito	9:41
Keisuke Ishii	Pin
Mike Bailey	Pin
Shunma Katsumata	9:01
Yukio Sakaguchi	Sub
Soma Takao	9:46
Toru Owashi	10:57
Harashima	Pin
Mao	Pin
Masahiro Takanashi	7:35
Tetsuya Endo	Pin
Kazusada Higuchi	12:41
Antonio Honda	18:53
Daisuke Sasaki	Sub
Thanomsak Toba	8:20
Kazuki Hirata	Pin

Round 3 (Note: The final eight participants were randomly shuffled.); August 25
Mao	Pin
Mike Bailey	11:33
Tetsuya Endo	Pin
Kazuki Hirata	12:22
Harashima	Pin
Yukio Sakaguchi	14:59
Daisuke Sasaki	Sub
Keisuke Ishii	22:49

Semifinals; August 26
Mao	9:45
Tetsuya Endo	Sub
Harashima	10:20
Daisuke Sasaki	Pin

Final; August 26
Tetsuya Endo	21:36
Daisuke Sasaki	Sub

=== 2019 ===
King of DDT 2019
- Promotion: DDT
- Date: April 29 – May 19, 2019
- City: Tokyo, Japan
- Venue: Various; Final: Korakuen Hall

King of DDT Tournament chronology
← Previous; 2018	Next → 2020

The 2019 King of DDT Tournament ran from April 29 to May 19. This edition featured 14 participants and a battle royale between six of the seven first round losers was held on the second day with the winner getting a bye to the second round. Konosuke Takeshita, the winner of the tournament went on to defeat Tetsuya Endo for the championship on July 15, beginning his fourth reign with the title.

Round 1 April 29
Daisuke Sasaki	Pin
Yukio Sakaguchi	11:37
Kazuki Hirata	9:42
Naomi Yoshimura	Pin
Konosuke Takeshita	Pin
Yuki Ueno	20:45
Akito	Pin
Harashima	14:26
Mike Bailey	10:08
Soma Takao	Pin
Mao	2:17
Masahiro Takanashi	Pin
Kazusada Higuchi	Pin
Kota Umeda	13:03

Round 2 May 6
Harashima (Note: On the May 6 event, Harashima defeated Kota Umeda, Mao, Kazuki Hirata, Yuki Ueno and Mike Bailey in a battle royale to earn a spot in the second round of the tournament.)	Pin
Daisuke Sasaki	12:59
Naomi Yoshimura	14:46
Konosuke Takeshita	Pin
Akito	7:10
Soma Takao	Pin
Masahiro Takanashi	7:12
Kazusada Higuchi	Pin

Semifinals; May 19
Kazusada Higuchi	8:41
Konosuke Takeshita	Pin
Soma Takao	Pin
Harashima	12:49

Final; May 19
Konosuke Takeshita	Pin
Soma Takao	21:11

=== 2020 ===
King of DDT 2020
- Promotion: DDT
- Date: August 8–23, 2020
- City: Tokyo, Japan
- Venue: Various; Final: Korakuen Hall
- Tagline: Midsummer DDT's strongest fight! (Note: Japanese: 真夏のDDT最強決定戦！, Hepburn: Manatsu no DDT saikyō ketteisen!)

King of DDT Tournament chronology
← Previous; 2019	Next → 2021

The 2020 King of DDT Tournament ran from August 8 to 23. This edition featured 28 participants and a "Dramatic Chance" battle royale between the losers of the first round was held on the second day, granting the winner a bye into the quarterfinals. The semifinalists were shuffled into new matches. For the first time since the introduction of the championship match reward, the reigning KO-D Openweight Champion Tetsuya Endo was allowed to participate in the tournament. Endo became the third two-time winner and received a 1 million yen prize from Blackout, the tournament sponsor. He went on to name Daisuke Sasaki as his challenger and then defeated him to retain the title on November 3, at Ultimate Party 2020.

Round 1 August 8
Yuki Ueno	Pin
Nobuhiro Shimatani	10:11
Antonio Honda	2:57
Danshoku Dino	Pin
T-Hawk	Pin
Kazuki Hirata	7:45
Makoto Oishi	Sub
Chris Brookes	8:41
Tomomitsu Matsunaga	6:51
Daisuke Sasaki	Sub
Shinya Aoki	Sub
Yuki Iino	0:36
Toru Owashi	Pin
Seigo Tachibana	4:31
Akito	Sub
Tetsuya Endo	17:21
Yukio Sakaguchi	3:41
Shunma Katsumata	Pin
Soma Takao	8:30
Minoru Tanaka	Sub
Harashima	Pin
Mad Paulie	11:19
Mizuki Watase	3:37
Kazusada Higuchi	Pin
Yukio Naya	10:17
El Lindaman	Pin
Naomi Yoshimura	8:07
Konosuke Takeshita	Pin

Round 2 August 9
Yuki Ueno	Pin
Danshoku Dino	10:18
T-Hawk	Pin
Makoto Oishi	11:00
Daisuke Sasaki	7:40
Shinya Aoki	Sub
Toru Owashi	5:33
Akito	Sub
Shunma Katsumata	11:52
Minoru Tanaka	Sub
Harashima	13:47
Kazusada Higuchi	Pin
El Lindaman	13:54
Konosuke Takeshita	Pin

Round 3 August 10
Yuki Ueno	13:23
T-Hawk	Pin
Shinya Aoki	8:24
Akito	Pin
Tetsuya Endo (Note: Tetsuya Endo won the Dramatic Chance battle royale to re-enter the tournament.)	Pin
Minoru Tanaka	17:20
Kazusada Higuchi	Pin
Konosuke Takeshita	16:13

Semifinals; August 23
T-Hawk	Pin
Akito	11:19
Tetsuya Endo	Sub
Kazusada Higuchi	10:19

Final; August 23
T-Hawk	20:24
Tetsuya Endo	Pin

=== 2021 ===
King of DDT 2021
- Promotion: CyberFight
- Brand: DDT
- Date: June 10 – July 4, 2021
- City: Tokyo, Japan
- Venue: Various; Final: Korakuen Hall
- Tagline: Achieve victory. (Note: Japanese: 勝ち上がれ。, Hepburn: Kachi agare)

King of DDT Tournament chronology
← Previous; 2020	Next → 2022

The 2021 King of DDT Tournament ran from June 10 to July 4 with 16 participants. Jun Akiyama and Yuji Hino took part in their first tournament. Konosuke Takeshita became a two-time winner and went on to defeat Jun Akiyama at Wrestle Peter Pan 2021 to win the KO-D Openweight Championship.

Round 1 June 10
Harashima	Pin
Makoto Oishi	7:13
Yuji Hino	Pin
Yukio Sakaguchi	10:51
Mao	Pin
Soma Takao	11:27
Akito	12:29
Konosuke Takeshita	Sub
Yuki Ueno	1:51
Daisuke Sasaki	Pin
Shunma Katsumata	7:43
Jun Akiyama	Pin
Kazusada Higuchi	Pin
Naomi Yoshimura	10:44
Tetsuya Endo	Pin
Chris Brookes	20:50

Round 2 June 20
Harashima	24:49
Yuji Hino	Pin
Mao	13:08
Konosuke Takeshita	Sub
Daisuke Sasaki	Pin
Jun Akiyama	4:02
Kazusada Higuchi	Pin
Tetsuya Endo	11:50

Semifinals; July 4
Daisuke Sasaki	16:58
Konosuke Takeshita	Sub
Yuji Hino	Pin
Kazusada Higuchi	12:36

Final; July 4
Konosuke Takeshita	Pin
Yuji Hino	18:09

=== 2022 ===
King of DDT 2022
- Promotion: CyberFight
- Brand: DDT
- Date: June 16 – July 3, 2022
- City: Tokyo, Japan
- Venue: Various; Final: Korakuen Hall

King of DDT Tournament chronology
← Previous; 2021	Next → 2023

The 2022 King of DDT Tournament ran from June 16 to July 3 with 16 participants. Hideki Okatani and Kanon made their first appearance in the tournament. Tetsuya Endo had to forfeit the tournament and vacate the KO-D Openweight Championship after having suffered a concussion at CyberFight Festival 2022. It was then announced that the winner of the tournament would be crowned champion. Kazusada Higuchi won the tournament for the first time and thus became the 79th KO-D Openweight Champion.

Round 1 June 16
Harashima	Pin
Hideki Okatani	9:06
Naomi Yoshimura	Pin
Chris Brookes	7:24
Kanon	15:09
Yuki Ueno	Pin
Daisuke Sasaki	Pin
Yuji Hino	8:45
Mao	14:59
Yuki "Sexy" Iino	Sub
Yukio Sakaguchi	10:46
Jun Akiyama	Pin
Kazusada Higuchi	Pin
Yukio Naya	18:45
Masahiro Takanashi	Forfeit
Tetsuya Endo	N/A

Round 2 June 19
Harashima	19:24
Naomi Yoshimura	Pin
Yuki Ueno	Pin
Daisuke Sasaki	12:49
Yuki "Sexy" Iino	11:34
Jun Akiyama	Sub
Kazusada Higuchi	Pin
Masahiro Takanashi	4:41

Semifinals; July 3
Yuki Ueno	Pin
Naomi Yoshimura	10:46
Kazusada Higuchi	Pin
Jun Akiyama	14:28

Final; July 3
Naomi Yoshimura	Pin
Kazusada Higuchi	18:55

=== 2023 ===
King of DDT 2023
- Promotion: CyberFight
- Brand: DDT
- Date: May 6–21, 2023
- City: Tokyo, Japan
- Venue: Various; Final: Korakuen Hall
- Tagline: It's everyone's game. (Note: Japanese: 全員本命。, Hepburn: Zen'in honmei.)

King of DDT Tournament chronology
← Previous; 2022	Next → 2024

The 2023 King of DDT Tournament ran from May 6 to May 21 with 16 participants. Naruki Doi, Kotaro Suzuki, Takeshi Masada and Yusuke Okada made their first appearance in the tournament. Yukio Naya was originally scheduled to participate but he suffered a broken ankle on the March 28 DDT event and was then replaced by Okada. Chris Brookes became the first European-born wrestler to win the King of DDT Tournament and went on to defeat Yuji Hino at Wrestle Peter Pan 2023 to win the KO-D Openweight Championship.

Round 1 May 6
Yusuke Okada	Stop
Kazusada Higuchi	9:11
Shunma Katsumata	Pin
Hideki Okatani	8:50
Sanshiro Takagi	Pin
Yukio Sakaguchi	3:40
Harashima	12:08
Chris Brookes	Pin
Jun Akiyama	Pin
Tetsuya Endo	10:12
Mao	Pin
Takeshi Masada	9:28
Kotaro Suzuki	Pin
Kanon	8:43
Yuki Ueno	Pin
Naruki Doi	16:19

Round 2 May 7
Kazusada Higuchi	Pin
Hideki Okatani	16:04
Sanshiro Takagi	12:04
Chris Brookes	Pin
Jun Akiyama	Pin
Mao	10:19
Kotaro Suzuki	12:59
Yuki Ueno	Pin

Semifinals; May 21
Jun Akiyama	11:20
Chris Brookes	Pin
Kazusada Higuchi	Pin
Yuki Ueno	10:57

Final; May 21
Chris Brookes	Sub
Kazusada Higuchi	24:28

=== 2024 ===
King of DDT: 20th Anniversary
- Promotion: CyberFight
- Brand: DDT
- Date: May 5–26, 2024
- City: Various; Final: Tokyo, Japan
- Venue: Various; Final: Korakuen Hall

King of DDT Tournament chronology
← Previous; 2023	Next → 2025

The 2024 King of DDT Tournament was a special edition celebrating the twentieth anniversary of the tournament. It ran from May 5 to May 26 with 16 participants, nine of which were previous King of DDT winners or finalists. Participants included inaugural winner Poison Sawada Julie, 2009 finalist Sanshiro Takagi, 2012 finalist Danshoku Dino, 2010 and 2013 winner Harashima, 2016 winner Shuji Ishikawa, 2017 and 2020 winner Tetsuya Endo, 2018 winner Daisuke Sasaki, 2022 winner Kazusada Higuchi, and previous year winner Chris Brookes. Takeshi Masada qualified for the tournament by virtue of winning the 2024 D Generations Cup.

Round 1 May 5
Poison Sawada Julie	9:16
Mao	Pin
To-y	Pin
Kanon	11:09
Sanshiro Takagi	Pin
Yuki Ueno	11:09
Daisuke Sasaki	Sub
Yuki Iino	11:15
Yukio Naya	14:12
Kazusada Higuchi	Pin
Shuji Ishikawa	Pin
Harashima	13:58
Danshoku Dino	18:26
Tetsuya Endo	Pin
Takeshi Masada	15:53
Chris Brookes	Pin

Round 2 May 11
Mao	Pin
To-y	17:36
Sanshiro Takagi	7:18
Daisuke Sasaki	Sub
Kazusada Higuchi	Pin
Shuji Ishikawa	16:16
Tetsuya Endo	14:58
Chris Brookes	TKO

Semifinals; May 26
Mao	Pin
Kazusada Higuchi	11:43
Chris Brookes	13:48
Daisuke Sasaki	Pin (Note: This was a No Disqualification match)

Final; May 26
Mao	Pin
Daisuke Sasaki	23:45

=== 2025 ===
King of DDT 2025
- Promotion: CyberFight
- Brand: DDT
- Date: May 6–25, 2025
- City: Tokyo, Japan
- Venue: Various; Final: Korakuen Hall

King of DDT Tournament chronology
← Previous; 2024	Next → 2026

The 2025 King of DDT Tournament ran from May 6 to May 25 with 16 participants. Kazusada Higuchi became a two-time winner.

Round 1 May 6
Yuki Ueno	Sub
Antonio Honda	15:05
Akito	4:44
Daisuke Sasaki	Sub
Shunma Katsumata	9:16
Kanon	Sub
Daichi Sato	12:33
Yukio Naya	Pin
To-y	11:58
Hideki Okatani	Pin
Harashima	Pin
Chris Brookes	0:22
Yuya Koroku	12:10
Takeshi Masada	Pin
Kazusada Higuchi	Sub
Shinya Aoki	15:34

Round 2 May 10
Yuki Ueno	Pin
Daisuke Sasaki	21:22
Kanon	Pin
Yukio Naya	12:41
Hideki Okatani	Pin
Harashima	12:25
Takeshi Masada	8:12
Kazusada Higuchi	Pin

Semifinals; May 25
Kazusada Higuchi	Pin
Yuki Ueno	12:10
Kanon	Pin
Hideki Okatani	9:41

Final; May 25
Kazusada Higuchi	Pin
Kanon	19:09

=== 2026 ===
King of DDT 2026
- Promotion: CyberFight
- Brand: DDT
- Date: May 4–31, 2026
- City: Tokyo, Japan
- Venue: Various; Final: Korakuen Hall

King of DDT Tournament chronology
← Previous; 2025	Next → —

The 2026 King of DDT Tournament will run from May 4 to May 31 with 16 participants. Kaisei Takechi was scheduled to participate, but he had to withdraw days prior due to appendicitis. He was replaced by Kazuki Hirata.

Round 1 May 4
Kazuki Hirata	11:26
Danshoku Dino	Pin
Takeshi Masada	Pin
To-y	8:47
Yukio Naya	16:17
Minoru Suzuki	Pin
Junta Miyawaki	11:51
Chris Brookes	Pin
Daichi Sato	7:48
Harashima	Pin
Kanon	12:31
Shinya Aoki	Pin
Yuya Koroku	11:21
Hideki Okatani	Pin
Kazuma Sumi	21:12
Mao	Sub

Round 2 May 9
Danshoku Dino	Pin
Takeshi Masada	11:42
Minoru Suzuki	Sub
Chris Brookes	20:29
Harashima	16:16
Shinya Aoki	Pin
Hideki Okatani	10:27
Mao	Pin

Semifinals; May 31
Danshoku Dino	11:54
Mao	Pin
Shinya Aoki	Pin
Minoru Suzuki	9:37

Final; May 31
Mao	17:20
Shinya Aoki	Pin

== See also ==
- DDT Pro-Wrestling
- Annual elimination tournaments in Japan:
  - New Japan Cup
  - Ōdō Tournament
  - Ryūkon Cup
  - Wrestle-1 Grand Prix
