= Japan Indie Awards =

Professional wrestling awards

The Japan Indie Awards (Japanese: 日本インディー大賞, Hepburn: Nihon Indī Taishō) were Japanese professional wrestling, or puroresu, awards that were handed out annually between 2007 and 2023 by the program Indie no Oshigoto, broadcast on the Fighting TV Samurai TV channel. Unlike the more widely publicized and recognized Tokyo Sports Puroresu Awards that are awarded to all Japanese promotions, the Japan Indie Awards focused on the independent circuit and the smaller promotions.

The awards were voted by fans who could vote online on the Samurai TV website. The winners were announced before the start of the New Year's Pro-Wrestling event in Korakuen Hall.

== Annual awards ==
=== MVP Award ===
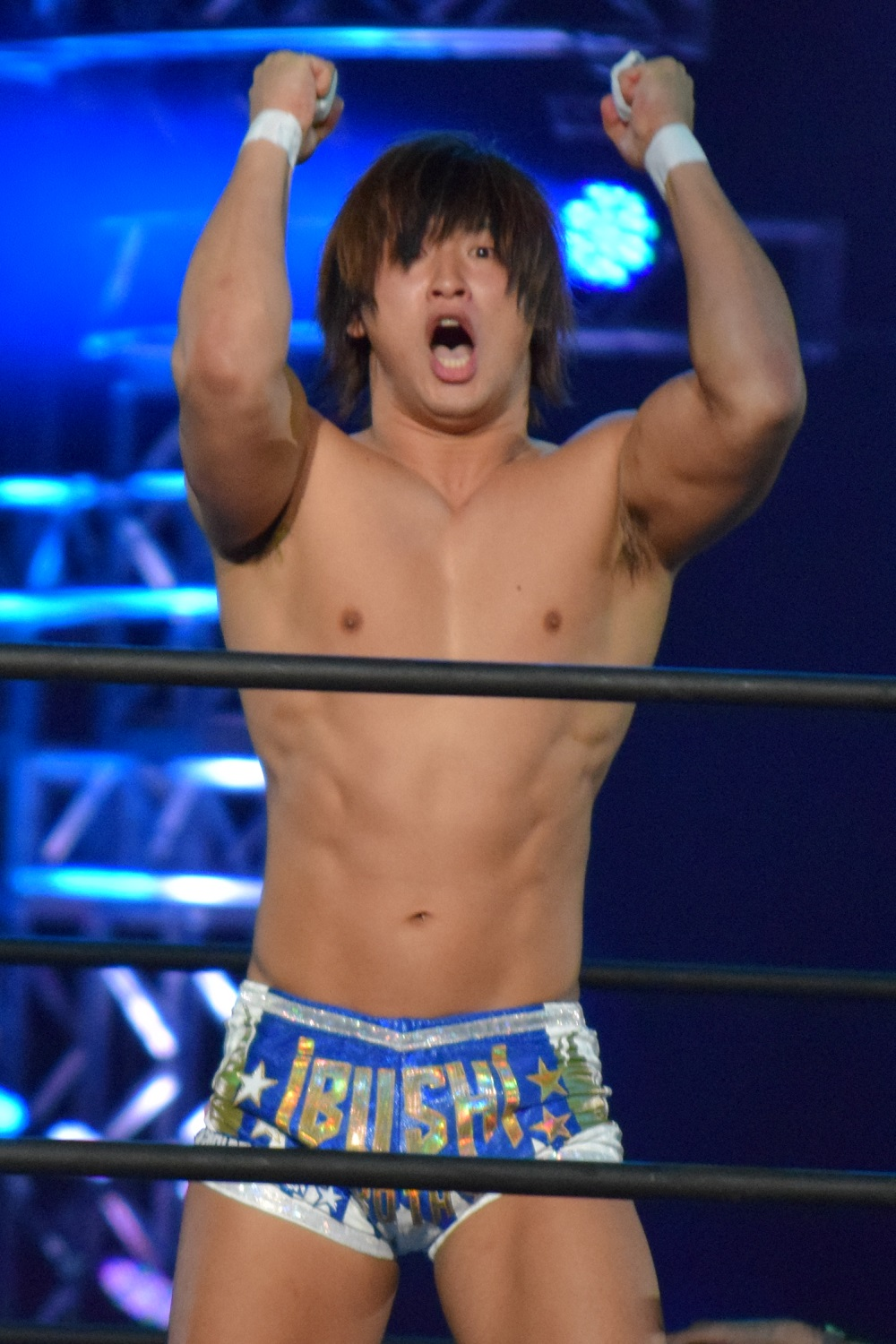
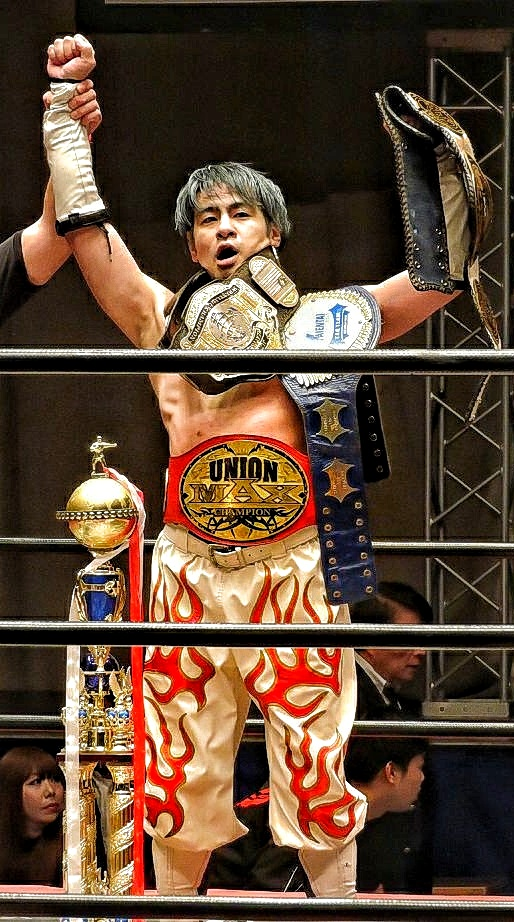
Kota Ibushi and Isami Kodaka are both two-time winners of the category

Year	Winner	Promotion
2007	Kota Ibushi	DDT Pro-Wrestling
2008	The Great Sasuke	Michinoku Pro Wrestling
2009	Kota Ibushi	DDT Pro-Wrestling
2010	Daisuke Sekimoto	Big Japan Pro Wrestling
2011	Munenori Sawa	Battlarts
2012	Abdullah Kobayashi	Big Japan Pro Wrestling
2013	Isami Kodaka	Union Pro Wrestling
2014	Harashima	DDT Pro-Wrestling
2015	Yuji Okabayashi	Big Japan Pro Wrestling
2016	Shuji Ishikawa	Freelance
2017	Hideki Suzuki	Freelance
2018	Masashi Takeda	Freelance
2019	Isami Kodaka	Pro-Wrestling Basara
2020	Minoru Fujita	Freelance
2021	Konosuke Takeshita	DDT Pro-Wrestling
2022	Kazusada Higuchi	DDT Pro-Wrestling
2023	Kazuki Hirata	DDT Pro-Wrestling

=== Best Bout Award (ベストバウト, Besuto Bauto) ===
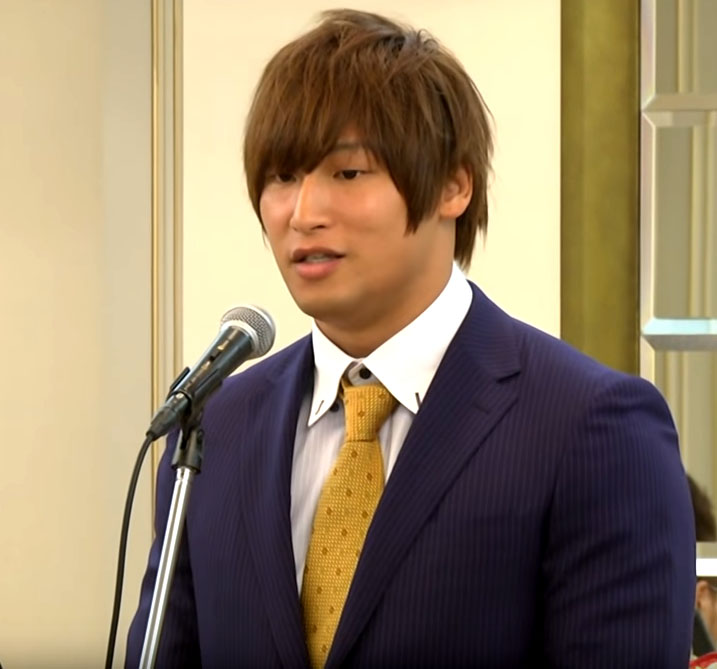
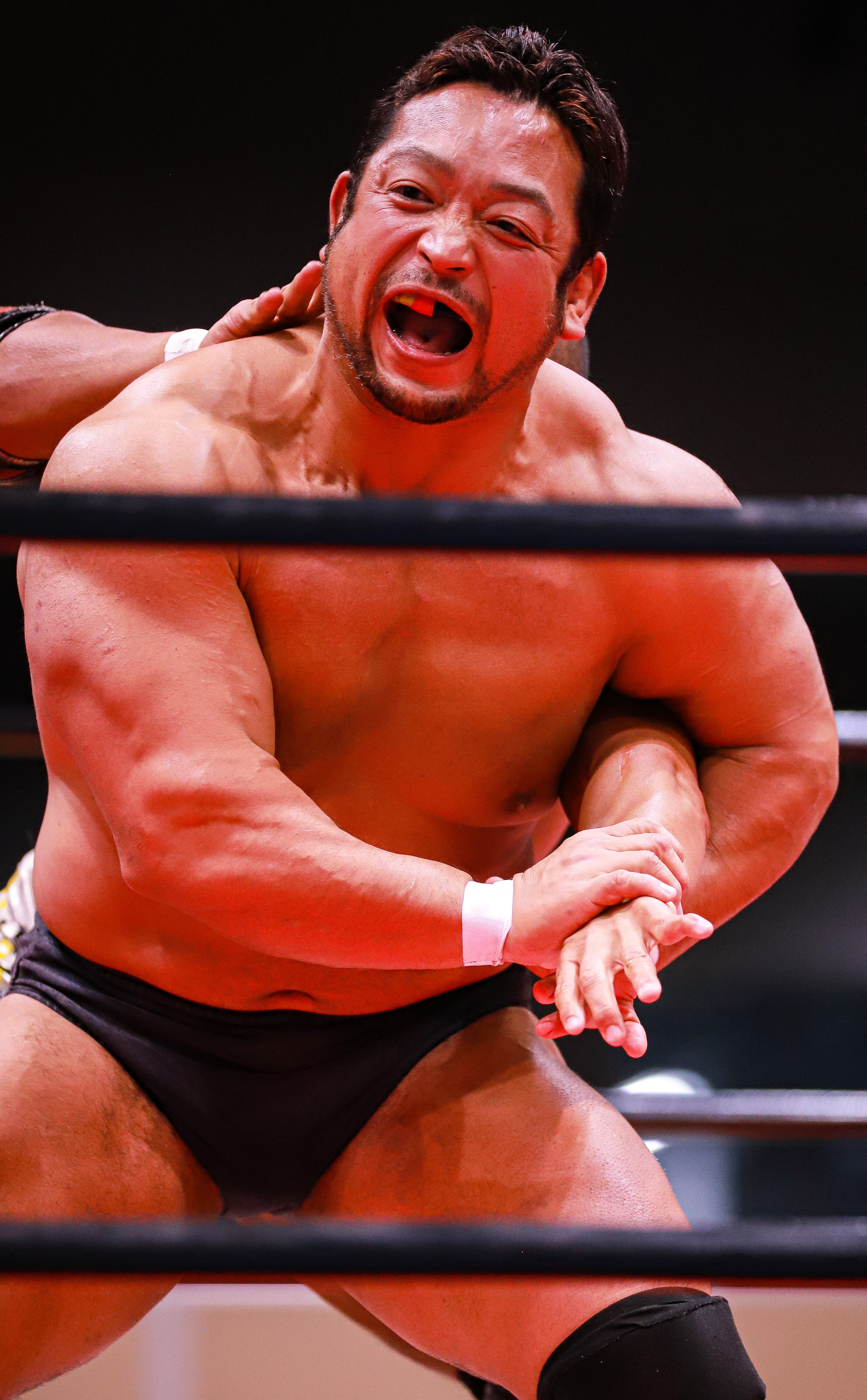
Kota Ibushi and Daisuke Sekimoto are both four-time winners of the category

Year	Winner	Promotion
2007	Takashi Sasaki vs. Yuko Miyamoto (March 14)	Big Japan Pro Wrestling
2008	Kota Ibushi vs. Kenny Omega (August 6)	DDT Pro-Wrestling
2009	Ryuji Ito vs. Jun Kasai (November 20)	Big Japan Pro Wrestling
2010	Daisuke Sekimoto vs. Masa Takanashi (April 4)	DDT Pro-Wrestling
2011	Dick Togo vs. Kota Ibushi (March 27)	DDT Pro-Wrestling
2012	Kota Ibushi vs. Kenny Omega (August 18)	DDT Pro-Wrestling
2013	Shuji Ishikawa vs. Isami Kodaka (November 4)	Big Japan Pro Wrestling
2014	Kota Ibushi and Kenny Omega vs. Tetsuya Endo and Konosuke Takeshita (September 28)	DDT Pro-Wrestling
2015	Daisuke Sekimoto vs. Yuji Okabayashi (July 20)	Big Japan Pro Wrestling
2016	Ryuji Ito vs. Kankuro Hoshino (July 24)	Big Japan Pro Wrestling
2017	Masashi Takeda vs. Masaya Takahashi (December 17)	Big Japan Pro Wrestling
2018	Masashi Takeda vs. Isami Kodaka (June 20)	Big Japan Pro Wrestling
2019	Daisuke Sekimoto vs. Michael Elgin (August 24)	Big Japan Pro Wrestling
2020	Tetsuya Endo vs. Daisuke Sasaki (November 3)	DDT Pro-Wrestling
2021	Takuya Nomura vs. Daisuke Sekimoto (October 18)	Big Japan Pro Wrestling
2022	Musashi vs. Fujita "Jr." Hayato (July 1)	Michinoku Pro Wrestling
2023	Fujita "Jr." Hayato vs. Hiromu Takahashi (October 15)	Michinoku Pro Wrestling

=== Best Show Award (ベスト興行賞, Besuto Kogyō-shō) ===
Year	Winner	Promotion
2007	Muscle House 4 (May 4)	Muscle
2008	Campsite Pro-Wrestling (September 7)	DDT Pro-Wrestling
2009	Ryōgoku Peter Pan (August 23)	DDT Pro-Wrestling
2010	Muscle House 10 (October 6)	Muscle
2011	Judgement 2011 (March 27)	DDT Pro-Wrestling
2012	Budokan Peter Pan (August 18)	DDT Pro-Wrestling
2013	Ryōgoku Peter Pan 2013 (August 18)	DDT Pro-Wrestling
2014	Ryōgoku Peter Pan 2014 (August 17)	DDT Pro-Wrestling
2015	Ryōgokutan 2015 (July 20)	Big Japan Pro Wrestling
2016	Bad Communication 2016 (October 2)	Ganbare☆Pro-Wrestling
2017	Autumn Ueno Pro-Wrestling Festival (November 17)	Big Japan Pro Wrestling
2018	Ryōgokutan 2018 (November 11)	Big Japan Pro Wrestling
2019	Ultimate Party 2019 (November 3); Ryōgokutan 2019 (November 4)	DDT Pro-Wrestling; Big Japan Pro Wrestling
2020	Last Buntai at BJW (August 29)	Big Japan Pro Wrestling
2021	Hiragana Muscle 5 (September 1)	DDT Pro-Wrestling
2022	Big Japan Welcome Back (May 5)	Big Japan Pro Wrestling
2023	Ultimate Party 2023 (November 12)	DDT Pro-Wrestling

=== Best Unit Award (ベストユニット賞, Besuto Yunitto-shō) ===
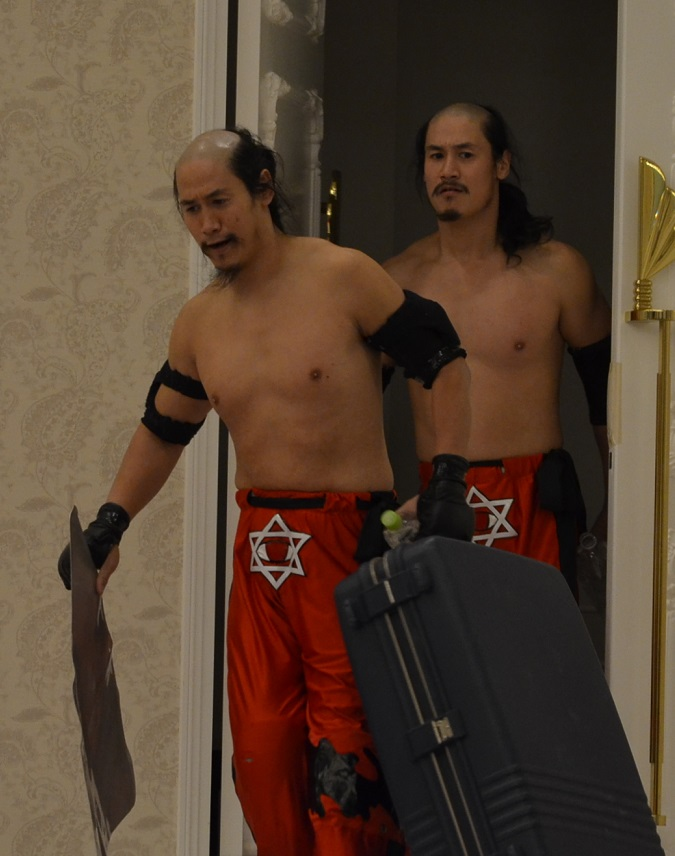
The Brahman Brothers won the category five times, including once alongside The Great Sasuke

Year	Winner
2007	New Men's Club
2008	The Brahman Brothers (Brahman Shu and Brahman Kei)
2009	The Brahman Brothers (Brahman Shu and Brahman Kei)
2010	Oga Gundan
2011	The Brahman Brothers (Brahman Shu and Brahman Kei)
2012	The Brahman Brothers (Brahman Shu and Brahman Kei)
2013	Yankee Nichōkenjū (Yuko Miyamoto and Isami Kodaka)
2014	Mū no Taiyō (The Great Sasuke, Brahman Shu and Brahman Kei)
2015	#OhkaEmpire
2016	Damnation
2017	Damnation
2018	#StrongHearts
2019	#StrongHearts
2020	Astronauts (Takuya Nomura and Fuminori Abe)
2021	Pheromones (Danshoku "Dandy" Dino, Yuki "Sexy" Iino and Yumehito "Fantastic" Himanari)
2022	Pheromones (Danshoku "Dandy" Dino, Yuki "Sexy" Iino, Yumehito "Fantastic" Himanari and Koju "Shining Ball" Takeda)
2023	Astronauts (Takuya Nomura and Fuminori Abe)

=== Newcomer Award (ニューカマー賞, Nyūkamā-shō) ===
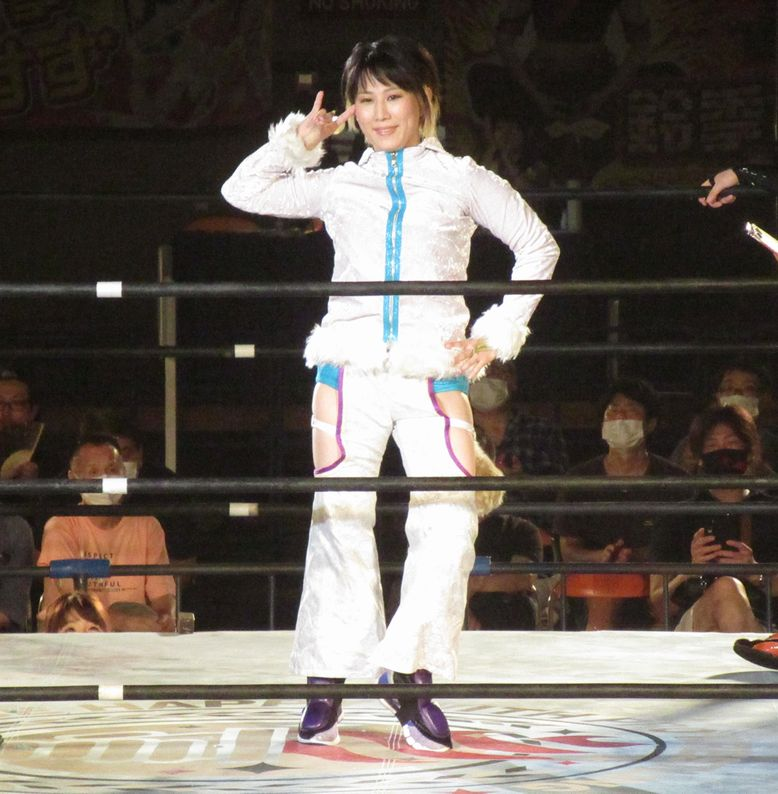
Mio Shirai was the first female wrestler to win this category in 2011

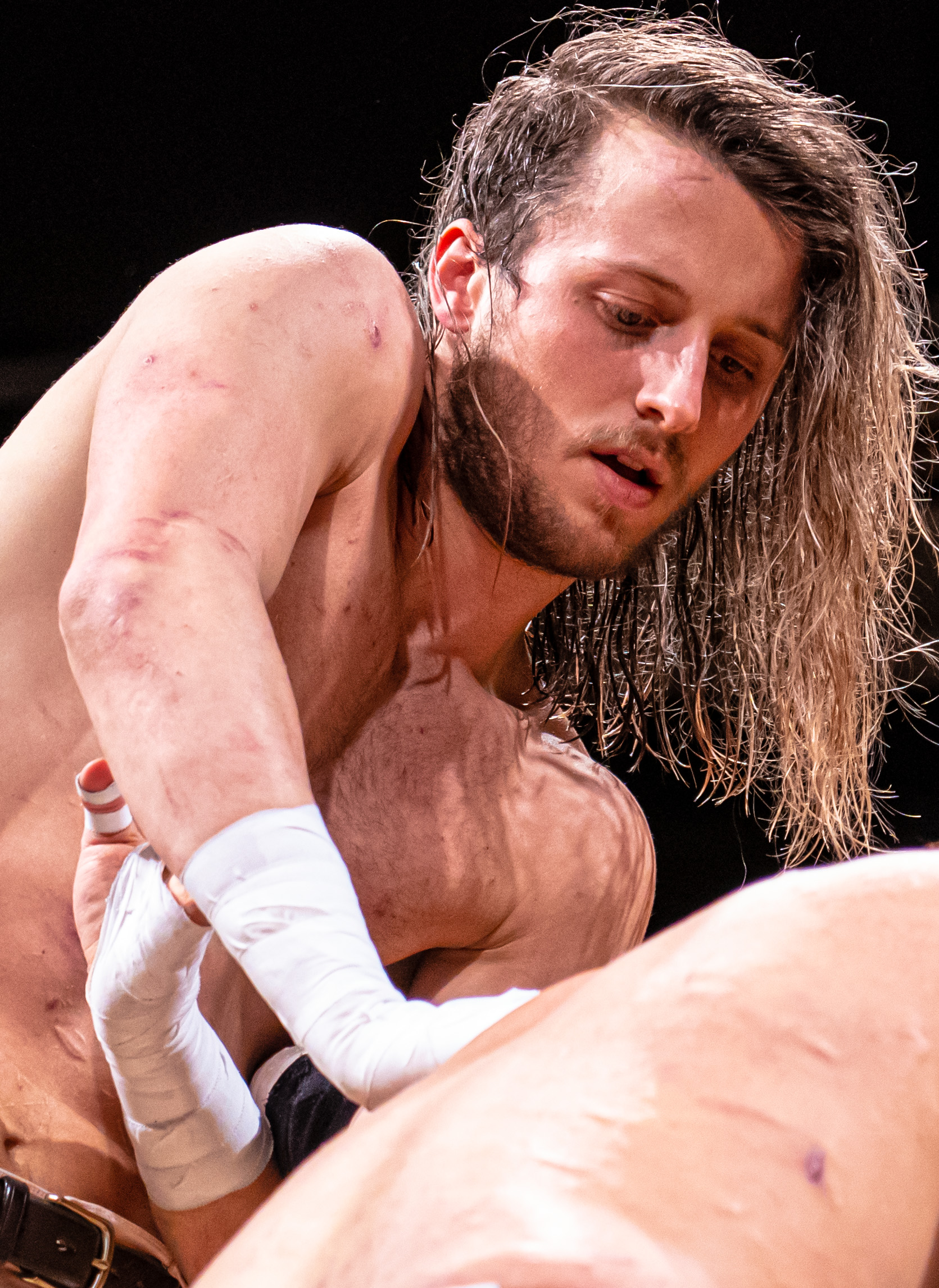
Drew Parker was the first non-Japanese to win this category in 2021

Year	Winner	Promotion
2008	Masashi Takeda	Style-E
2009	Masashi Takeda	Style-E
2010	Tsuyoshi Kikuchi	Freelance
2011	Mio Shirai	Freelance
2012	Takumi Tsukamoto	Big Japan Pro Wrestling
2013	Masaya Takahashi	Wrestling New Classic
2014	Takayuki Ueki	Big Japan Pro Wrestling
2015	Kazusada Higuchi	DDT New Attitude
2016	Takuya Nomura	Big Japan Pro Wrestling
2017	Andreza Giant Panda	New Nemuro Pro Wrestling
2018	Shuuoh Fujiwara	Pro-Wrestling Alive & Majors
2019	Keigo Nakamura	DDT Pro-Wrestling
2020	Rina Yamashita	Freelance
2021	Drew Parker	Big Japan Pro Wrestling
2022	Daiju Wakamatsu	Active Advance Pro Wrestling
2023	Munetatsu Nakamura	Ganbare☆Pro-Wrestling

== Nonsequential awards ==
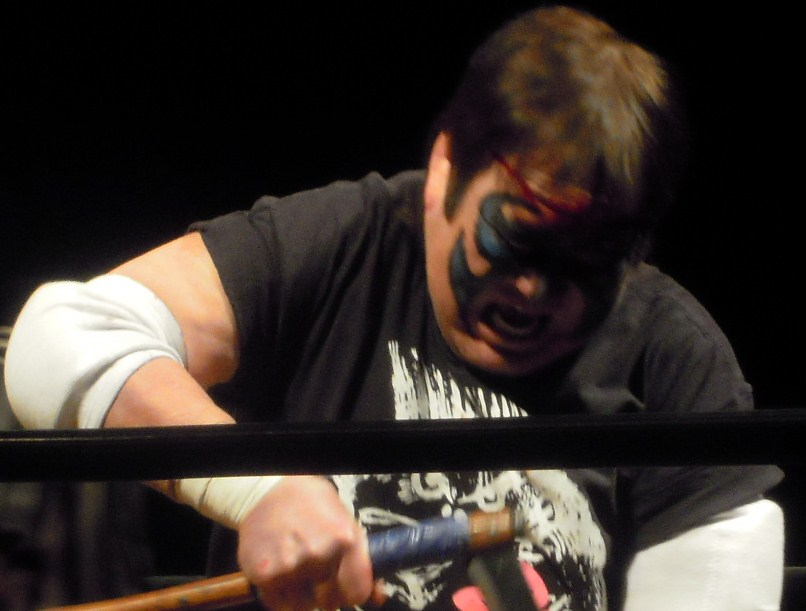
Mr. Pogo was posthumously awarded a Lifetime Achievement Award in 2017

=== Special Award (特別賞, Tokubetsu-shō) ===
Year	Winner	Promotion
2007	Choun Shiryu	—
2009	Gentaro	Pro Wrestling Freedoms
2010	Hikaru Sato	Pancrase Mission

=== Comeback Award (カムバック賞, Kamubakku-shō) ===
Year	Winner	Promotion
2007	Mr. Pogo	World Wing Spirit Pro-Wrestling

=== Lifetime Achievement Award (特別功労賞, Tokubetsu Kōrō-shō) ===
Year	Winner	Promotion
2017	Mr. Pogo	World Wing Spirit Pro-Wrestling

== See also ==
- Tokyo Sports Puroresu Awards
- List of professional wrestling awards
