= Budokan Peter Pan =

2012 DDT Pro-Wrestling event

Budokan Peter Pan: Celebrating DDT’s 15th Anniversary, A Spectacular 4-Hour Special
- Promotion: DDT Pro-Wrestling
- Date: August 18, 2012
- City: Tokyo, Japan
- Venue: Nippon Budokan
- Attendance: 10,124

Peter Pan chronology
← Previous; 2011	Next → 2013

Budokan Peter Pan: Celebrating DDT’s 15th Anniversary, A Spectacular 4-Hour Special (武道館ピーターパン〜DDTの15周年、ドーンと見せます超豪華4時間SP〜, Budōkan Pītā Pan: DDT no Jūgo-shūnen, Dōn to Misemasu Chōgōka Yon-jikan Supesharu) was a professional wrestling event promoted by DDT Pro-Wrestling (DDT). The event took place on August 18, 2012, in Tokyo at the Nippon Budokan. The event featured ten matches, three of which were contested for championships. The event aired on Fighting TV Samurai.

== Storylines ==
The Budokan Peter Pan event featured ten professional wrestling matches that involved different wrestlers from pre-existing scripted feuds and storylines. Wrestlers portrayed villains, heroes, or less distinguishable characters in the scripted events that built tension and culminated in a wrestling match or series of matches.

By winning the King of DDT tournament on July 8, Kenny Omega earned a title match in the main event against KO-D Openweight Champion Kota Ibushi.

== Event ==
Preceding the main card was the "Muscle Offers Time Musclehouse 10.5 Dark Match Rising", a twelve-man tag team match pitting wrestlers from DDT's sub-brand Muscle against wrestlers from the Style-E promotion, which turned into a 7-on-6 handicap match once Muscle Sakai entered the match. Team Muscle emerged victorious after Sakai hit Choun "Bones" Shiryu with the "Verdict" for a pinfall victory.

Next, in the opening ceremony, Sunplaza Nakano-kun performed a special version of "Ōkina Tamanegi no Shita de" on stage.

=== Preliminary matches ===
The opening match of the main card was a gauntlet tag team match featuring, in order of entrance, the teams of Keisuke Ishii and Shigehiro Irie, Isami Kodaka and Hiroo Tsumaki, Saint Rion and Poison Julie Sawada, Dohentai-dan (Hikaru Sato and Michael Nakazawa), and lastly Soma Takao and Yukio Sakaguchi. Kodaka and Tsumaki were the first eliminated after Irie delivered a vertical drop backflip to Tsumaki and pinned him. The second stage of the match concluded with Ishii performing a kneel kick to Sawada for a pinfall. Then, Ishii submitted to Sato's ankle hold to eliminate his team. Finally, Sato and Nakazawa were eliminated when Takao performed a diving guillotine drop on Nakazawa for the last pinfall.

Next, DJ Nira defended the Ironman Heavymetalweight Championship in a Rumble rules match with 13 participants, including World Wonder Ring Stardom's Yuzuki Aikawa. During the match, E. Yoshihiko, a rag doll wearing male makeup, won the title by eliminating DJ Nira and became the 960th champion. Yoshiaki Fujiwara, the eventual winner of the match, then eliminated E. Yoshihiko and became the 961st champion. Afterwards, Hiroshi Fukuda tried to pin Fujiwara, but the newly crowned champion put Fukuda in a Fujiwara armbar, successfully defending his title.

The next match saw the debut of Konosuke Takeshita against El Generico. Generico secured a victory by performing his signature "Brainbustaaaaahhhhh!!!!!" for a pinfall win.

After that was a "5 vs. 5 Soccer match". The match consisted of two halves of 5 minutes each where each team tried to score the most falls by two-count pinfall or submission. In the case of a tie, the match was to be decided by an actual soccer penalty shoot-out. The teams were Tonkatsu SC (Masa Takanashi, Daisuke Sasaki, Hoshitango, Tetsuya Endo and Tsukasa Fujimoto) and Meiwaku FC (Yasu Urano, Antonio Honda, Yuji Hino, Thanomsak Toba and Yoshiko). The first point went to Tonkatsu FC when Fujimoto submitted Honda in the "Tsukadora". Meiwaku FC tied when Urano delivered a diving body press to Sasaki for a pinfall. In the second half, Hino scored a point for Meiwaku FC by pinning Endo after a "Fxxk'n Bomb", then Tonkatsu FC tied when Takanashi performed a "Takatonic" on Urano for a pinfall. The match then went to a penalty shoot-out in which Tonkatsu FC scored their first and fourth attempts, while Meiwaku failed to score any penalties.

Next, Homoiro Clover Z (Kudo and Makoto Oishi) defended the KO-D Tag Team Championship against Mikami and Dradition's Tatsumi Fujinami. In the closing moments, Mikami delivered the "Volcanic Bomb" to Oishi and pinned him to win the title.

The seventh match was a "Handicap Weapon Rumble" pitting Sanshiro Takagi against Minoru Suzuki. Unlike a traditional DDT Weapon Rumble where both participants would bring their pre-selected weapons at regular intervals throughout the match, this match was a handicap match in which only Takagi was allowed to bring weapons. Despite the handicap, the match concluded with Suzuki performing the "Gotch-Style Piledriver" and pinning Takagi for the victory.

Next was a tag team hardcore match, in which Harashima teamed with New Japan Pro-Wrestling's Togi Makabe to face Shuji Ishikawa and Big Japan Pro Wrestling's Ryuji Ito. In the end, Harashima delivered a "Swan Dive Somato" to Ishikawa for a pinnfall victory.

After that was a "Transparent Electric Explosion Deathmatch", a parody of the "Explosive Barbed Wire Rope Deathmatch" stipulation used in hardcore promotions such as Frontier Martial Arts Wrestling, in which the explosions were non-existent but where the wrestlers and the referee would act as if they were real. In the match, Danshoku Dino faced Invisible Man, an "invisible wrestler" i.e. non-existent. Dino lost the match by pinfall after being rendered unconscious by a non-existent explosion.

=== Main event ===
In the main event, Kota Ibushi defended the KO-D Openweight Championship against Kenny Omega, the winner of the 2012 King of DDT Tournament. Ibushi won by performing the "Phoenix Splash" to pin Omega and retain his title.

== Results ==
No.	Results	Stipulations	Times
1^{P}	Team Muscle (Muscle Sakai, Hiroshi Fukuda, Pedro Takaishi, Kazuyoshi Sakai HG, Norikazu Fujioka, Mr. Magic and Seiya Morohashi) defeated Team Style-E (Kazuhiro Tamura, Masashi Takeda, Masato Shibata, Shota, Kotaro Nasu and Choun "Bones" Shiryu)	7-on-6 handicap match	12:07
2	Soma Takao and Yukio Sakaguchi defeated Keisuke Ishii and Shigehiro Irie, Dohentai-dan (Hikaru Sato and Michael Nakazawa), Isami Kodaka and Hiroo Tsumaki, and Poison Julie Sawada and Saint Rion	Gauntlet tag team match	21:24
3	Yoshiaki Fujiwara won by last eliminating E. Yoshihiko	Rumble rules match for the Ironman Heavymetalweight Championship	19:22
4	El Generico defeated Konosuke Takeshita	Singles match	10:36
5	Tonkatsu SC (Masa Takanashi, Daisuke Sasaki, Hoshitango, Tetsuya Endo and Tsukasa Fujimoto) defeated Meiwaku FC (Yasu Urano, Antonio Honda, Yuji Hino, Thanomsak Toba and Yoshiko) 2–2 (2–0 on penalties)	5 vs. 5 Soccer match	10:00
6	Mikami and Tatsumi Fujinami defeated Homoiro Clover Z (Kudo and Makoto Oishi) (c)	Tag team match for the KO-D Tag Team Championship	9:04
7	Minoru Suzuki defeated Sanshiro Takagi	Handicap Weapon Rumble match	17:33
8	Harashima and Togi Makabe defeated Shuji Ishikawa and Ryuji Ito	Hardcore tag team match	14:36
9	Invisible Man defeated Danshoku Dino	Transparent Electric Explosion Deathmatch	16:16
10	Kota Ibushi (c) defeated Kenny Omega	Singles match for the KO-D Openweight Championship	37:26
(c) / – the champion(s) heading into the match; P / – the match was broadcast on the pre-show

=== Gauntlet match ===
Elimination	Wrestler	Team	Eliminated by	Elimination move	Time	Ref.
1	Hiroo Tsumaki	Kodaka and Tsumaki	Shigehiro Irie	Pinned after a Vertical Drop Backflip	6:04	
2	Poison Julie Sawada	Sawada and Rion	Keisuke Ishii	Pinned after a Kneel Kick	8:07	
3	Keisuke Ishii	Ishii and Irie	Hikaru Sato	Ankle Hold	12:23	
4	Michael Nakazawa	Dohentai-dan	Soma Takao	Pinned after a Diving Guillotine Drop	21:24	
Winners:	Soma Takao and Yukio Sakaguchi					

=== Rumble rules match ===
Order	Name	Order eliminated	By	Time
1	DJ Nira (c)	8	E. Yoshihiko (Note: E. Yoshihiko becomes the 960th Ironman Heavymetalweight Champion.)	16:18
2	Daichi Kakimoto	1	Tomomitsu Matsunaga and Mio Shirai	3:55
3	Tomomitsu Matsunaga	3	Toru Owashi	7:08
4	Batten Tamagawa	2	Toru Owashi	7:01
5	Mio Shirai	4	Nozomi	8:21
6	Hiroshi Fukuda	5	Yuzuki Aikawa	11:50
7	Toru Owashi	10	E. Yoshihiko	17:13
8	Nozomi	7	Yoshiaki Fujiwara	14:30
9	Gorgeous Matsuno	9	E. Yoshihiko	16:46
10	Akito	11	E. Yoshihiko	17:20
11	Yuzuki Aikawa	6	Yoshiaki Fujiwara	14:08
12	Yoshiaki Fujiwara	—	—	Winner
13	E. Yoshihiko	12	Yoshiaki Fujiwara	19:22
