= Tōno Openweight Championship =

Professional wrestling championship

Details
- Promotion: DDT Pro-Wrestling
- Current champion(s): 726
- Date won: August 20, 2005
Statistics
- First champion(s): 726

The Tōno Openweight Championship (遠野無差別級王座, Tōno musabetsu-kyū ōza) is an inactive professional wrestling championship in the Japanese promotion DDT Pro-Wrestling. The title was established in 2005 and was only contested in its inaugural match, in Tōno, Iwate. The belt, presented by the mayor Toshiaki Honda, was made from a jingisukan pan, a dish said to have originated in Tōno.

== Title history ==
726 was crowned the first champion after he beat Cherry and Tomohiko Hashimoto on August 20, 2005. Since then, the title has never been defended, nor has it been officially deactivated.

== Reigns ==
Key
No.	Overall reign number
Reign	Reign number for the specific champion
Days	Number of days held
Defenses	Number of successful defenses
+	Current reign is changing daily

No.	Champion	Championship change			Reign statistics			Notes	Ref.
No.	Champion	Date	Event	Location	Reign	Days	Defenses	Notes	Ref.
1	726	August 20, 2005	Tōno Jingisukan 2005	Tōno, Japan	1	7,160+	0	Defeated Cherry and Tomohiko Hashimoto in a three-way match to win the inaugural title.	

== See also ==
- DDT Pro-Wrestling
- Professional wrestling in Japan
