= DDT Pro-Wrestling =

Japanese professional wrestling promotion

- DDT logo since April 2018
- Acronym: DDT
- Founded: 1997
- Style: Puroresu; Comedy wrestling
- Headquarters: Shinjuku, Tokyo, Japan
- Founder: Shintaro Mutoh
- Parent: CyberFight (CyberAgent)
- Sister: Pro Wrestling Noah; Tokyo Joshi Pro Wrestling
- Formerly: Dramatic Dream Team (1997–2004)
- Website: ddtpro.jp

DDT Pro-Wrestling (DDTプロレスリング, DDT Puroresuringu) is a Japanese professional wrestling promotion based in Shinjuku, Tokyo. Its name is an initialism of Dramatic Dream Team, which was the promotion's original name from 1997 to 2004. Founded in March 1997 by Shintaro Muto, the promotion was eventually bought and managed by Shoichi Ichimiya until December 2005, when Sanshiro Takagi took over as the new president. In 2017, DDT was sold to CyberAgent. Takagi retained his position, while Takahiro Yamauchi took over as the new DDT director.

DDT became one of the top promotions in Japanese independent wrestling by creating a unique sports entertainment style, often parodying WWE, with a Japanese puroresu flair to the matches. DDT's biggest event is Peter Pan, held each year since 2009.

The cards' matches tend to be a mixture of Japanese lucharesu (a mix of lucha libre and traditional puroresu), worked shoot-style, hardcore brawling and comedy matches. DDT is in many ways a parody of American pro wrestling, particularly WWE, using over-the-top gimmicks (most notably Danshoku Dino) as well as unique match types including hardcore matches in a campsite (which featured use of bottle rockets as weapons), an "Office Deathmatch" (where the ring was set up to resemble a section of an office building, complete with cubicle walls and computers), and a "Silence Match" (where wrestlers were forbidden to make loud noises, resulting in slow-motion chops and punches and featuring the commentary team speaking in a faux-whisper).

In January 2020, DDT's parent company CyberAgent purchased Pro Wrestling Noah, with DDT's executives taking over Noah's operations and Noah's content appearing on DDT's streaming service Wrestle Universe.

== History ==
=== Dramatic Dream Team (1997–2004) ===
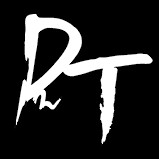
Former DDT logo (1997–2013)

The promotion was founded by Shintaro Muto, Sanshiro Takagi, Kyohei Mikami and Kazushige Nosawa, after they left Pro Wrestling Crusaders. The promotion was named Dramatic Dream Team, with its first event titled Judgement taking place on March 25, 1997, in Tokyo. In July 1999, DDT announced that their shows would begin airing on City TV Nakano's Channel 5 (CTN) from September 3, every Friday at midnight, under the provisional title Soreiuke DDT. Simultaneously, VHS tapes of their events were made available for purchase starting with the June 27 show.

In 2000, DDT established their own governing body, the King of DDT (KO-D), and created the KO-D Openweight Championship, the Ironman Heavymetalweight Championship, and the KO-D Tag Team Championship. DDT also created their own tag team tournament: the DDT Tag League. By early 2001, DDT were airing their regular Non-Fix events, which were usually held at Club Atom in Tokyo, weekly on Kit Manzox Club, a channel of the digital satellite broadcaster Sky PerfecTV!. The channel also aired weekly hour-long broadcasts covering other events on CTN and Cable Network Ota's Oh!Touch!! (CNO), under the name Battle of Millennium. In April 2001, DDT announced that they would begin airing the Non-Fix events on Perfect Choice, the pay-per-view (PPV) channel of Sky PerfecTV!, starting on May 10. The shows aired on the second and fourth Thursday of each month, at a cost of 800 yen per viewing. Subsequently, DDT began airing a new program on Kit Manzox Club called DDT Superstars, which focused on individual wrestlers of the company.

Later in 2003, Shoichi Ichimiya became the new president of DDT.

=== Independent DDT Pro-Wrestling (2004–2017) ===
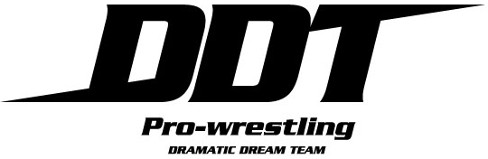
Former DDT logo (2013-2018)

In April 2004, DDT rebranded to DDT Pro-Wrestling yūgen gaisha renaming the promotion to DDT Pro-Wrestling. In October, DDT got a timeslot on Fighting TV Samurai, creating their regular broadcast program DDT Dramatic Fantasia. In 2005, indie promotion Union Pro Wrestling was revived by DDT.

On December 28, 2005, Ichimiya retired from professional wrestling and announced his departure from DDT. This led to Sanshiro Takagi taking over the promotion as the new president. Then the company focused on the feud between the face stable Italian Four Horsemen and the heel stable Disaster Box. In November 2006, DDT announced the creation of their fourth active title the DDT Extreme Championship. Later in 2007 DDT announced a working relationship with Dragon Gate. DDT and Dragon Gate held their first co-promoted show, Dramatic Dream Gate on April 18, 2007, in Shinjuku Face in Tokyo, Japan. DDT would later become a member of the Global Professional Wrestling Alliance. The group was established as a means to aid the many competing wrestling promotions in Japan. In 2009, DDT announced that they were going to become a stock company, turning their company from private to public. In March 2010, DDT announced a working relationship with Big Japan Pro Wrestling. Later in March, Takagi announced the DDT48 (later renamed Dramatic Sōsenkyo), which was a fan vote where the winner received a shot at the KO-D Openweight Championship. Later that month, in storyline, Michael Nakazawa stepped down as the CEO of DDT and Amon Tsurumi became the General Manager of the promotion. In 2011, DDT received the Fighting TV Samurai Indie no Oshigoto prize for having the best show the year, winning the Best Show Award for Judgement 2011.

In March 2012, the Dramatic Fantasia weekly program was briefly cancelled by Samurai TV. This led to the launch of the program DDT Wrestling Hour on Niconico, starting April 2. On June 4, DDT launched another sub-brand named Tokyo Joshi Pro-Wrestling (TJPW), which was exclusive to women's wrestlers. DDT celebrated its 15th anniversary on August 18, 2012, by holding its first ever event in Nippon Budokan. On December 23, 2012, DDT announced the creation of their fifth active title, the KO-D 6-Man Tag Team Championship. On January 17, 2013, DDT announced that Daisuke Sasaki had signed a contract to officially make DDT his home promotion, ending his days as a freelancer. On April 17 DDT formed another sub-brand Ganbare☆Pro-Wrestling (GanPro). On May 3, DDT's Max Bump event was broadcast live by Samurai TV. After that DDT launched a weekly program DDT's Pro-Wrestling Banzai \(^o^)/, which was also broadcast by Samurai TV. On November 28, DDT announced a new project named DDT New Attitude (DNA) which would be another sub-brand of DDT, functioning as a developmental brand for DDT.

On January 14, 2015, DDT opened a women's wrestling school with Makoto Oishi and Cherry as instructors. Later DDT announced the creation of their sixth active title, the King of Dark Championship, which would be "won" by the loser of a dark match. On June 23, DDT opened the Dropkick Bar which is a professional wrestling, boxing and mixed martial arts-themed sports bar. Professional wrestling personalities regularly make appearances at the bar. On August 17 it was announced that Union Pro would be folding after its 10th anniversary event on October 4. Three days after its folding, Union was replaced by a new promotion named Pro-Wrestling Basara, which launched in January 2016. In October 2016, DDT announced "DDT Universe", a new streaming service for events held by DDT, DNA, Basara, TJPW and GanPro. The service launched on January 23, 2017. On April 30, 2017, announced the creation of their seventh active title, the KO-D 10-Man Tag Team Championship, meant for teams of five wrestlers, the title is believed to be the first of its kind in professional wrestling. with the inaugural champions crowned on August 20, 2017.

On July 5, 2017, it was announced that DDT had entered into a partnership with Canada's Canadian Wrestling's Elite promotion. On August 20 at Ryōgoku Peter Pan, Danshoku Dino defeated Sanshiro Takagi in a match, where if Dino won he would become the Producer of DDT. After Dino won he fired the DDT's General Manager Amon Tsurumi and Turumi returned to a backstage role as assistant producer and reverted to his real name Hisaya Imabayashi. Dino also announced the creation of a new tournament called "D-Oh Grand Prix".

=== DDT under CyberAgent (2017–present) ===
On September 1, 2017, 100% of DDT's shares were sold to the CyberAgent company. Sanshiro Takagi remained as the DDT president, while CyberAgent director Takahiro Yamauchi took over as the new DDT director.

On June 11, 2019, DDT announced Basara would be splitting up from DDT and become an independent company starting January 1, 2020. In October, the third edition of the annual "Iron Fist Tag Tournament" led to the creation of Basara's first tag team championship, the Iron Fist Tag Team Championship.

On January 28, 2020, DDT's parent company CyberAgent purchased Pro Wrestling Noah. DDT's President Sanshiro Takagi was named the President of Pro Wrestling Noah and Naomichi Marufuji the Vice President. Noah's events began airing on DDT's streaming service DDT Universe starting with Noah's 2020 Global Junior Heavyweight League on January 30. On July 27, 2020, it was announced Noah and DDT would merge in a new company, CyberFight.

On March 20, 2022, at Judgement, it was announced that All Elite Wrestling (AEW) had formed a working relationship with DDT and TJPW that would see wrestlers from both brands appear on AEW programming.

On December 15, 2023, DDT was announced as one of the founding members of the United Japan Pro-Wrestling alliance, a joint effort to further develop professional wrestling in Japan through promotion and organization, with Seiji Sakaguchi being named as the chairman of the project.

== Championships ==
=== Current championships ===
==== Singles ====
Championship	Current champion(s)	Reign	Date won	Days held	Successful defenses	Location	Notes	Ref.
KO-D Openweight Championship	Mao	1	August 11, 2026	87	0	Tokyo, Japan	Defeated Yuki Ueno at Wrestle Peter Pan.	
DDT Universal Championship	Ryusuke Taguchi	1	August 11, 2026	87	0	Tokyo, Japan	Defeated Kazuma Sumi at Wrestle Peter Pan.	
DDT Extreme Championship	Shunma Katsumata	4	August 11, 2026	87	0	Tokyo, Japan	Defeated Hideki Okatani in a Barbed wire Deathmatch at Wrestle Peter Pan.	
O-40 Championship	Daisuke Sasaki	1	November 22, 2025	349	0	Tokyo, Japan	Defeated Antonio Honda at Shout Your Love in the Ring of Hama.	
World Ōmori Championship	Masahiro Takanashi	1	November 10, 2024	726	0	Tokyo, Japan	Defeated Soma Takao at Utan Festival.	
Ironman Heavymetalweight Championship	Yoshihiko	15	November 3, 2026	3	—	Tokyo, Japan	Pinned Mansoor at Ultimate Party.	

==== Tag teams ====
Championship	Current champion(s)	Reign	Date won	Days held	Successful defenses	Location	Notes	Ref.
KO-D Tag Team Championship	paleyouth (Takeshi Masada and Yuya Koroku)	1 (2, 1)	September 27, 2026	40	0	Tokyo, Japan	Defeated Shinya Aoki and Junta Miyawaki at Final Face 2026 Goodbye To Shinjuku FACE!.	
KO-D 6-Man Tag Team Championship	Damnation T.A (Daisuke Sasaki, Hideki Okatani and Ilusion)	2 (9, 3, 2)	September 21, 2026	46+	0	Tokyo, Japan	Defeated Strange Love Connection (Kanon, Viento Levante, and Yukio Naya) at Dramatic Infinity 2026.	
KO-D 10-Man Tag Team Championship	Damnation T.A. (Daisuke Sasaki, Demus, Hideki Okatani, MJ Paul and Ilusion)	1	December 28, 2025	313	0	Nagoya, Japan	Defeated To-y, Yuya Koroku, Yuki Ishida, Kazuma Sumi and Daichi Sato (who replaced Keigo Nakamura) at Year-End Dramatic Parade 2025.	

=== Former, inactive and defunct championships ===
DDT has had a lot of different championships, some of which were very short-lived.

Championship	Last champion(s)	Reign	Date won	Location	Notes
Tōno Openweight Championship	726	1	August 20, 2005	Tōno, Japan	Defeated Cherry and Tomohiko Hashimoto at Tōno Jingisukan 2005 to become the inaugural champion. Inactive since.
Greater China Unified Sichuan Openweight Championship	Danshoku Dino	1	July 19, 2009	Tokyo, Japan	Unified with the DDT Extreme Championship at Ryōgoku Peter Pan.
Umemura PC Juku Copy & Paste Championship	Danshoku Dino	1	July 26, 2009	Nagoya, Japan	Unified with the DDT Extreme Championship at Ryōgoku Peter Pan.
GAY World Anal Championship	Danshoku Dino	2	August 23, 2009	Tokyo, Japan	Defeated Masa Takanashi at Ryōgoku Peter Pan to unify the title with the DDT Extreme Championship.
JET World Jet Championship	Danshoku Dino	1	August 23, 2009	Tokyo, Japan	Defeated Masa Takanashi at Ryōgoku Peter Pan to unify the title with the DDT Extreme Championship.
World Midbreath Championship	Danshoku Dino	1	August 23, 2009	Tokyo, Japan	Defeated Masa Takanashi at Ryōgoku Peter Pan to unify the title with the DDT Extreme Championship.
Jiyūgaoka 6-Person Tag Team Championship	Shit Heart♥Foundation (Hikaru Sato, Michael Nakazawa and Tomomitsu Matsunaga)	1	November 3, 2010	Tokyo, Japan	Defeated Great Kojika, Riho and Mr. #6 at Shin-Kiba 5th Anniversary Special. Deactivated.
Sea of Japan 6-Person Tag Team Championship	Shit Heart♥Foundation (Hikaru Sato, Michael Nakazawa and Tomomitsu Matsunaga)	1	November 3, 2010	Tokyo, Japan	Defeated Great Kojika, Riho and Mr. #6 at Shin-Kiba 5th Anniversary Special.
Greater China Unified Zhongyuan Tag Team Championship	TKG48 (Munenori Sawa and Sanshiro Takagi)	2	July 24, 2011	Tokyo, Japan	Defeated The Great Sasuke and Ricky Fuji at Ryōgoku Peter Pan 2011.
World Aipoke Championship	Super Sasadango Machine	1	May 18, 2014	Tokyo, Japan	Defeated Ryu Gouma in a No Disqualification Only "Say Yes" Deathmatch at Golden Union 2014. Inactive following Union Pro folding on October 4, 2015.
IMGP World Heavyweight Championship	Atsushi Maruyama	2	July 12, 2015	Osaka, Japan	Defeated Super Sasadango Machine at Dramatic Dreams! Vol. 2: No Subtitle to win the vacant title.
Fly To Everywhere World Championship	Cherry	3	September 15, 2015	Tokyo, Japan	Defeated Aoi Kizuki at Union Harvest Festival 2015. Inactive following Union Pro folding on October 4, 2015.
King of Dark Championship	Dai Suzuki	2	December 13, 2017	Tokyo, Japan	Lost to Gota Ihashi at Ryōgoku Peter Pan 2017 to win the title. Inactive following Suzuki's retirement.
Uchicomi! Openweight Ultimate Championship	Ken Ohka	1	July 22, 2018	Tokyo, Japan	Won a Scramble Tag Team Rumble Match by last eliminating Gota Ihashi at Summer Vacation 2018 to become the inaugural champion.
Kōkū-kōen Park Town Championship	Keisuke Ishii	1	August 24, 2019	Tokorozawa, Japan	Was awarded the title after pinning Shuhei Washida in a tag team match at Ganbare☆Kōkū-kōen.
UWA World Trios Championship	Sparky (Ryota Nakatsu, Naoki Tanizaki and Akiyori Takizawa)	1	December 29, 2019	Tokyo, Japan	Defeated Takato Nakano, Takumi Tsukamoto and Yasu Urano at Basara 115. Title moved to Big Japan Pro Wrestling (BJW).
Independent World Junior Heavyweight Championship	Shota	1	December 26, 2020	Tokyo, Japan	Defeated Asuka at The World 2020. Title moved to Professional Wrestling Just Tap Out (JTO).
GWC 6-Man Tag Team Championship	The Halfee (Katsuzaki Shunosuke, Moehiko Harumisawa and Shu Sakurai)	2	May 29, 2021	Tokyo, Japan	Defeated Asuka, Hagane Shinno and Shinichiro Tominaga at True Romance 2021. Title moved to Total Triumph Team Pro-Wrestling (TTT).

== Events ==
=== Marquee events ===
- Sweet Dreams!
- Into The Fight
- Judgement
- April Fool
- Max Bump
- What Are You Doing
- Summer Vacation
- Peter Pan
- Who's Gonna Top?
- God Bless DDT
- Ultimate Party
- Never Mind

=== Tournaments ===
==== Active ====
Accomplishment	Last winner(s)	Date won	Location	Notes
King of DDT	Shinya Aoki	May 31, 2026	Tokyo, Japan	Defeated Mao in the tournament final.
D Generations Cup	Kazuma Sumi	February 22, 2026	Tokyo, Japan	Defeated Takeshi Masada in the tournament final.

==== Inactive ====
Tournament	Last winner(s)	Last held	Type	Created	Notes
D-Oh Grand Prix	Yukio Naya	2024	Openweight	2018	A round-robin tournament for a shot at the KO-D Openweight Championship.
Ultimate Tag League	Disaster Box (Harashima and Naomi Yoshimura)	2022	Tag team	2000	A tag team round-robin tournament, previously held under the names DDT Tag League (2000) and KO-D Tag League (2001–05).
King of Street Wrestling	Chris Brookes	2022	Street fight	2022	A single elimination street fight tournament, held in 2022.
Young Drama Cup	Soma Takao	2010	Openweight	2009	A round-robin tournament for the younger talent of DDT, held in 2009 and 2010.
Pro-Wrestling Koshien	Naomi Yoshimura	2017	Openweight	2003	A single-elimination tournament, held in 2015 and 2017, and previously held as a round-robin tournament in 2003.
D.J.Battle	Kyohei Mikami	1999	Openweight	1998	A single elimination tournament, held in 1998 and 1999.

=== Accomplishments ===
Accomplishment	Last winner(s)	Date won	Location	Notes
DDT Dramatic General Election (Note: Japanese: DDTドラマティック総選挙, Hepburn: DDT Doramatikku Sōsenkyo)	Masahiro Takanashi (singles)	October 30, 2018	Tokyo, Japan	Won by fan votation. Formerly known as DDT48.
DDT Dramatic General Election	Shuten-dōji (units)	October 30, 2018	Tokyo, Japan	Won by fan votation. Formerly known as DDT48.
Right to Challenge Anytime Anywhere (Note: Japanese: いつでもどこでも挑戦権, Hepburn: Itsu Demo Doko Demo Chōsenken)	Shinya Aoki	August 14, 2022	Tokyo, Japan	Contracts for a championship match, which can be "cashed in" by the holder at any point in the year following their victory (similar to WWE's Money in the Bank contract). Unlike Money in the Bank, contract holders have to defend their contracts in every official match in which they participate.

== Dropkick Bar ==
Drop Kick Bar, Swan Dive & Ebisuko Tavern is a professional wrestling, boxing and mixed martial arts-themed sports bars owned and operated by DDT in Shinjuku. Professional wrestling personalities make appearances at the bar.

== Broadcasters ==
Domestic

- Fighting TV Samurai (2004–present, currently broadcasting live specials, retrospective shows and magazine show DDT Pro Wrestling Banzai)
- AbemaTV (2017–present, online linear television service, live-streaming episodes of DDT Pro Wrestling Banzai)
- Nico Nico Douga (2012–present, currently broadcasting live specials, DDT Wrestling Hour streaming untelevised spot-shows and interviews)

Worldwide

- Wrestle Universe (streaming service, broadcasting most DDT shows live, as well as on-demand classic, as well as content from other promotions, beginning with DDT sister promotions Pro Wrestling Noah, Ganbare☆Pro-Wrestling and Tokyo Joshi Pro-Wrestling)
- Triller TV (2020–present, streaming service, broadcasting most DDT big shows live, as well as on-demand classic)

== See also ==
- Professional wrestling in Japan
- List of professional wrestling promotions in Japan
