= Ryōgoku Peter Pan =

2009 DDT Pro-Wrestling event

Ryōgoku Peter Pan: I Will Never Grow Up
- Promotion: DDT Pro-Wrestling
- Date: August 23, 2009
- City: Tokyo, Japan
- Venue: Ryōgoku Kokugikan
- Attendance: 8,865

Peter Pan chronology
← Previous —	Next → 2010

Ryōgoku Peter Pan: I Will Never Grow Up (Japanese: 両国ピーターパン〜大人になんてなれないよ〜, Hepburn: Ryōgoku Pītā Pan Otona ni Nante Narenaiyo) was a Japanese professional wrestling event promoted by DDT Pro-Wrestling (DDT). The event took place on August 23, 2009, in Tokyo at the Ryōgoku Kokugikan. The event featured ten matches, four of which were contested for championships. The event was announced on December 28, 2008 at the Never Mind 2008 event and its name was revealed at a press conference on February 13, 2009. In prevision on the event, DDT broadcast their tour titled "Road to Ryōgoku" on Fighting TV Samurai. This was the first event held under the Peter Pan name.

== Storylines ==
The Ryōgoku Peter Pan event featured ten professional wrestling matches that involved different wrestlers from pre-existing scripted feuds and storylines. Wrestlers portrayed villains, heroes, or less distinguishable characters in the scripted events that built tension and culminated in a wrestling match or series of matches.

By winning the KO-D Openweight Championship Contendership Tournament on July 10, Kota Ibushi earned a title match in the main event of Ryōgoku Peter Pan against KO-D Openweight Champion Harashima.

== Event ==
The second dark match was a tag team deathmatch set to end at 5:00 pm in which the result would decide of the fate of Michael Nakazawa's anus. However, according to the rules of the match, every possible outcome would result in Nakazawa's anus being blown up by fireworks.

On the main card, the opening match saw the debut of Soma Takao.

The following match was a Rumble rules match in which Yoshihiko, an inflatable love doll with male make-up accompanied to the ring by Yusuke Inokuma, defended its Ironman Heavymetalweight Championship. During the match, Shoichi Ichimiya appeared under two different names: Giru Nakano, a parody of Bull Nakano and Keigi Mutoh, a parody of Keiji Mutoh. After being eliminated early on thus losing its title to Toru Owashi, Yoshihiko reappeared in the match as Sumo Yoshihiko and ended-up as the runner-up of the match.

After the match, Sumo Yoshihiko pinned Toru Owashi to win back the Ironman Heavymetalweight title and become the 825th champion.

The fifth match featured Mitsuya Nagai from Dradition and Munenori Sawa from Battlarts.

The sixth match was a Winner takes all match for nine titles (most of those being comedic titles). Danshoku Dino was holding the DDT Extreme Championship, the World Ōmori Championship, the Greater China Unified Sichuan Openweight Championship, the Umemura PC Juku Copy & Paste Championship and the DJ Nira World Championship while Masa Takanashi was holding the J.E.T. World Jet Championship, the GAY World Anal Championship, the DJ Nira World And Strongest In History Championship and the World Mid Breath Championship. As a result of the match, all titles except the World Ōmori Championship were unified with the DDT Extreme Championship.

The seventh match featured The Great Sasuke from Michinoku Pro Wrestling and was a "Weapon Rumble" in which various weapons secretly chosen by the participants beforehand were being introduced one after another at regular intervals. Some of those weapons included a bowl of oden, Kaientai Dojo joshi wrestler Bambi with a whip, a mobile phone and hypnosis.

The eighth match featured Masahiro Chono from New Japan Pro-Wrestling.

The ninth match featured Piza Michinoku from Kaientai Dojo as well as Jun Kasai from the hardcore promotion Pro-Wrestling Freedoms.

== Results ==
No.	Results	Stipulations	Times
1^{D}	Italian Four Horsemen (Antonio Honda and Sasaki and Gabbana) defeated Hikaru Sato and Kazuhiro Tamura	Tag team match	9:50
2^{D}	Sanshiro Takagi and Kazuhiko Ogawasara vs. Yoshiaki Yago and Mummy (with Black Mummy) ended in a time-limit draw	Michael Nakazawa Anus Explosion tag team deathmatch If the match was not settled by 5:00 pm, Nakazawa's anus would be blown up; if Takagi's team won, Nakazawa's anus would be blown up; if Yago's team won, Nakazawa's anus would be blown up.	—
3	Yukihiro Abe, Keisuke Ishii and Soma Takao defeated Shigehiro Irie, Tomokazu Taniguchi and Gota Ihashi	Six-man tag team match	12:04
4	Toru Owashi won by last eliminating Sumo Yoshihiko	Rumble rules match for the Ironman Heavymetalweight Championship	20:10
5	Mitsuya Nagai and Munenori Sawa defeated Hoshitango and Thanomsak Toba	Tag team match	13:13
6	Danshoku Dino (Extreme, Ōmori, Sichuan, Umemura and DJ Nira World) defeated Masa Takanashi (JET, GAY, DJ Nira History and Midbreath)	Winner takes all match for the DDT Extreme, World Ōmori, Greater China Unified Sichuan Openweight, Umemura PC Juku Copy & Paste, DJ Nira World, JET World Jet, GAY World Anal, DJ Nira World And Strongest In History and World Midbreath Championships.	19:26
7	Sanshiro Takagi defeated The Great Sasuke	Weapon Rumble match	21:25
8	Masahiro Chono defeated Poison Julie Sawada by knockout	Singles match	17:13
9	Kudo and Yasu Urano defeated Italian Four Horsemen (Francesco Togo and Piza Michinoku) (c), Jun Kasai and Mikami and Kenny Omega and Mike Angels	Four-way tag team elimination match for the KO-D Tag Team Championship	23:00
10	Kota Ibushi defeated Harashima (c)	Singles match for the KO-D Openweight Championship	25:29
(c) / – the champion(s) heading into the match; D / – this was a dark match

=== Rumble rules match ===
Order	Name	Order eliminated	By	Time
1	Toru Owashi	—	—	Winner
2	Yoshihiko (c)	1	Toru Owashi (Note: Owashi becomes the 824th Ironman Heavymetalweight Champion.)	0:15
3	DJ Nira	2	Toru Owashi	1:48
4	Giru Nakano (Note: Shoichi Ichimiya parodying Bull Nakano under the name Giru Nakano (偽ル中野; "Fake Nakano"))	3	Yumiko Hotta	5:11
5	Danbu Matsumoto	4	Tomoya	9:40
6	Yumiko Hotta	12	Keigi Mutoh	17:19
7	Hideki Shioda	5	Kengo Takai	10:40
8	Rion Mizuki	7	Riho	12:40
9	Azul Dragon	8	Riho	12:45
10	Tomoya	6	Toru Owashi	11:46
11	Kengo Takai	9	Riho	12:51
12	Michael Nakazawa	14	Sumo Yoshihiko	19:45
13	Riho	10	Michael Nakazawa	15:09
14	Tomomitsu Matsunaga	11	Keigi Mutoh	16:38
15	Choun Shiryu	13	Sumo Yoshihiko	19:20
16	Keigi Mutoh (Note: Shoichi Ichimiya parodying Keiji Mutoh under the name Mutō Keigi (武藤敬偽; "Fake Mutoh"))	15	Sumo Yoshihiko	19:45
17	Sumo Yoshihiko (Note: Yoshihiko dressed as a sumo wrestler)	16	Toru Owashi	20:10

=== Four-way tag team elimination match ===
Eliminated	Wrestler	Team	Eliminated by	Method	Time
1	Mike Angels	Kenny Omega and Mike Angels	Mikami	Pinfall	12:10
2	Mikami	Jun Kasai and Mikami	Piza Michinoku	Pinfall	15:05
3	Piza Michinoku	Francesco Togo and Piza Michinoku	Yasu Urano	Pinfall	23:00
Winners:	Kudo and Yasu Urano				
