= Yoshihiko (wrestler) =

Doll character in Japanese professional wrestling

- DDT Pro-Wrestling character
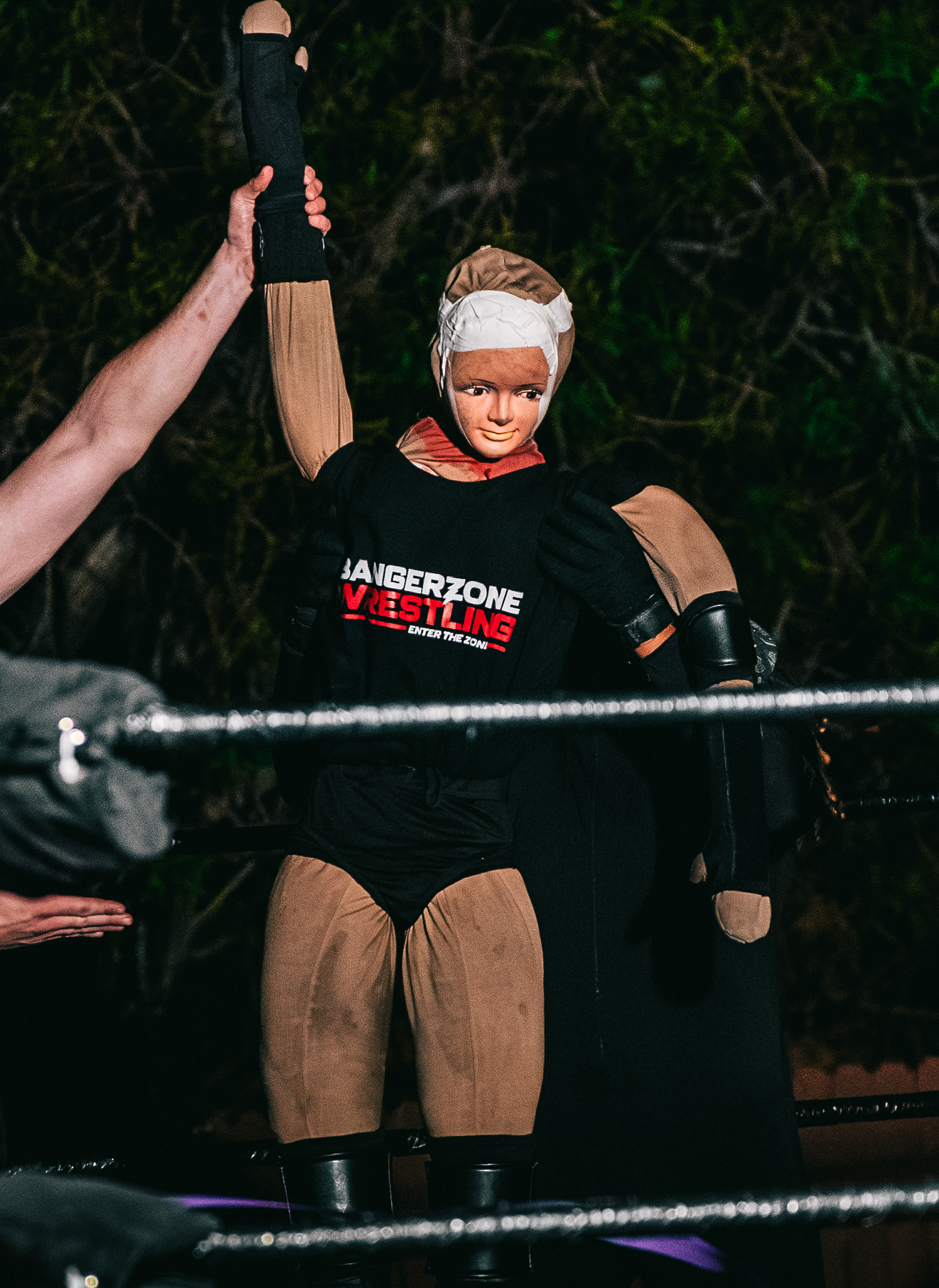
- Yoshihiko in April 2025
- First appearance: February 9, 2005
- Created by: DDT Pro-Wrestling

Yoshihiko (ヨシヒコ, Yoshihiko) is a professional wrestling character and a roster member of the Japanese professional wrestling promotion DDT Pro-Wrestling (DDT). The character has been portrayed exclusively by a series of inflatable or stuffed female sex dolls but is treated as a legitimate competitor within kayfabe, having held four different championship titles.

== Overview ==
In DDT events and television broadcasts, Yoshihiko is portrayed as a human opponent, with the fact that it is a doll left unacknowledged. During matches, opponents, tag team partners, and seconds manipulate the doll's movements to stage the bout. Matches involving Yoshihiko allow wrestlers to demonstrate the worked performance techniques that create the illusion of a dramatic wrestling contest. Within kayfabe, commentators describe Yoshihiko as moving and competing autonomously. This portrayal has extended beyond DDT to other promotions Yoshihiko has appeared in, such as Game Changer Wrestling in the United States.

Due to its ultra-lightweight body and inability to sustain human injury, Yoshihiko is depicted performing superhuman acrobatic movements, referred to by commentators as "sixth-dimensional killing techniques." Because of these characteristics, frequent "accidents" occur, such as joints bending in unnatural directions, being thrown from the ring into the audience, deflation during matches, limbs detaching, or stuffing (described as "brain") being expelled from its head. As a result of such incidents, Yoshihiko's body has been replaced with new dolls on at least three occasions.

Discussing his approach to matches involving Yoshihiko, Kenny Omega stated:

…we make people feel sorry for this thing and make people feel as though it's a human being putting its life on the line for the entertainment of the fans. We took a lot of time and effort to come up with a way this is going to look legitimate and a way that people are going to be sucked into this world where you could believe it.

== Character history ==
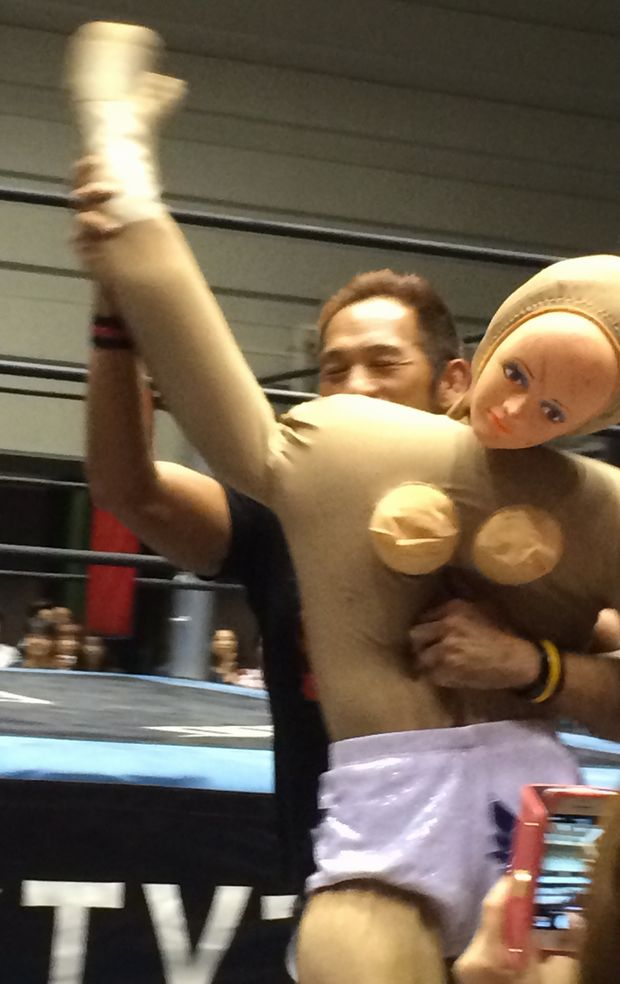
Yoshihiko being held by Michael Nakazawa in 2014.

On February 9, 2005, Yoshihiko made his debut in DDT Pro-Wrestling under the gimmick of being Muscle Sakai's younger brother. He competed in a match against Kuma Sentoin but withdrew due to a mysterious "illness" (air leakage) that caused his body to deflate. Yoshihiko continued to participate in matches throughout 2005 but did not return until 2009.

At Judgement 2009, Yoshihiko appeared as Danshoku Dino's tag team partner. Together, they defeated Piza Michinoku and Antonio Honda to become the number one contenders for the KO-D Tag Team Championship. During the match, Honda destroyed Yoshihiko's head, but the character "reincarnated" when replaced with another doll mid-match. The new version was dressed in a costume resembling The Great Muta. At Max Bump 2009, Yoshihiko and Dino challenged Kota Ibushi and Kenny Omega for the titles. Yoshihiko's head burst after a giant swing from Omega, and he was carried out of the arena. Later in the match, he reappeared dressed in The Undertaker's biker outfit and made a comedic tricycle entrance. Despite performing with visible "injuries," Yoshihiko and Dino were narrowly defeated after a 30-minute match. Following the bout, Antonio Honda and two accomplices appeared and "shot" Yoshihiko.

Yoshihiko later won the Ironman Heavymetalweight Championship from Yoshiaki Yago on June 28, 2009. At Ryōgoku Peter Pan on August 23, he competed in a rumble rules battle royal, losing the title to Toru Owashi but reclaiming it later in the match as "Sumo Yoshihiko," wearing a chonmage and mawashi. On October 25, Yoshihiko challenged Ibushi, then KO-D Openweight Champion, in a double title match at Welcome To Never Land 2009 in Korakuen Hall, Tokyo. Performing under a parody of Hulk Hogan, Yoshihiko showcased exaggerated power moves, including eight consecutive Canadian Destroyers. After a 25-minute match, he was pinned by Ibushi's Phoenix Splash. However, after interference from outside the ring, Yoshihiko managed to roll up Ibushi and regain the Ironman Heavymetalweight title. Later, his mask was removed by Dino and Masa Takanashi, revealing "Robo Chojin."

On December 31, 2009, Yoshihiko entered the 108-participant New Year's Rumble at Tenka Sanbun no Kei: Ōmisoka New Year's Eve Special. He eliminated Yotsukaider with a Hurricanrana before being eliminated after a double attack from Kengo Mashimo and Hiroyuki Miyamoto. Yoshihiko's entrance reportedly received one of the loudest reactions of the event.

On June 13, 2010, Yoshihiko, Mitsuru Sato, and Keisuke Ishii won the UWA World Trios Championship from Tokyo Gurentai and competed at Ryōgoku Peter Pan 2010. They lost the titles on July 25 in a three-way match also featuring Kudo, Antonio Honda, and Yasu Urano, with Great Kojika, Mr. #6, and Riho emerging as the winners.

On April 29, 2011, Yoshihiko made his first appearance outside DDT and Union at Kaientai Dojo's GWSP6 event, teaming with Ibushi for a failed challenge for the WEW Hardcore Tag Team Championship.

On August 18, 2013, DDT debuted Yoshihiko's "sister" Akihiro, another love doll who has since become a 3-time Ironman Heavymetalweight Champion in its own right.

On February 15, 2015, after Ibushi won the KO-D Openweight Championship, he named Yoshihiko as his next challenger. The match was held on March 21, 2015. Yoshihiko executed nine consecutive Canadian Destroyers before losing to Ibushi's Last Ride, Phoenix Splash, and single-arm crab hold.

In July 2020, Yoshihiko embarked on a solo U.S. tour and faced Joey Janela in an Ironman Heavymetalweight Championship match at Game Changer Wrestling's Homecoming Weekend Part 2 in Atlantic City, New Jersey, where he was defeated.

In 2024, Yoshihiko was among the final three competitors in the Clusterfuck Battle Royal at Joey Janela's Spring Break: Clusterfuck Forever 2024, surviving a pizza cutter attack from Nick Gage before being eliminated by Microman. Later that year, Yoshihiko and Mao won the BZW Tag Team Championship at the Alcatraz event in Faches-Thumesnil, France, defeating Jack Sans-Nom and Paul Robinson via a "Rainmaker." They successfully defended the titles on January 3, 2025, at New Year☆Dramatic Parade 2025: Answer Will Be Given in a Year.

Yoshihiko made a return at Fighting Beer Garden 2025 in Shinjuku on September 9, 2025, parodying The Undertaker's entrance to challenge Kazuki Hirata for the KO-D Openweight Championship. A contract signing was held on September 17 at a DDT outdoor event. On September 28 at Dramatic Infinity 2025, Yoshihiko was defeated by Hirata in the main event. Following the match, a storyline twist revealed Yuki Ueno as the mysterious figure aligned with Yoshihiko, who subsequently cashed in his challenge and won the KO-D title.

On September 30, 2025, DDT announced via X (formerly Twitter) that Yoshihiko would be taking a hiatus due to accumulated "injuries," stating: "After years of accumulated damage, Yoshihiko will undergo a full overhaul and will be out for a long time."

== Championships and accomplishments ==
- Banger Zone Wrestling

- BZW Tag Team Championship (1 time) – with Mao

- DDT Pro-Wrestling

- Ironman Heavymetalweight Championship (24 times, current)
- KO-D 8-Man Tag Team Championship (1 time) – with Toru Owashi, Antonio Honda and Kazuki Hirata
- UWA World Trios Championship (1 time) – with Mitsuru Sato and Keisuke Ishii
