= World Ōmori Championship =

Professional wrestling championship

Details
- Promotion: DDT Pro-Wrestling
- Date established: 2006
- Current champion: Ilusion
- Date won: November 8, 2026

Other names
- Ōmori Dream Fair Championship (2006–2012); World Ōmori Class Championship (2012–2018)
Statistics
- First champion: The Mac
- Longest reign: Danshoku Dino (1,939 days)
- Shortest reign: Thanomsak Toba (22 days)
- Oldest champion: Gurukun Mask (43 years, 40 days)
- Youngest champion: Daichi Kakimoto (23 years, 312 days)
- Heaviest champion: The Mac (145 kg (320 lb))
- Lightest champion: Thanomsak Toba (65 kg (143 lb))

The World Ōmori Championship (Japanese: 世界大森級王座, Hepburn: Sekai Ōmori-kyū Ōza) is a professional wrestling championship in the Japanese promotion DDT Pro-Wrestling. The title was established in 2006 and named after the Ōmori Dream Fair (大森夢フェア, Ōmori Yume Fea) festival held annually in Ōmori, a district of Tokyo, Japan. The current champion is Ilusion who is in his first reign.

== History ==
In 2008, the title became inactive after Daichi Kakimoto retired. It was reactivated in 2009 in order for Danshoku Dino and Masa Takanashi to have a nonuple winner takes all match at Ryōgoku Peter Pan.

From 2010 to 2018, the title has been defended annually at the Utan Festival event held at the Ōmori Station East Plaza in Ōta, Tokyo. It then remained inactive until November 2022 when DDT returned to Utan Festival and Soma Takao defeated Chikara for the title.

On March 20, 2025, at Judgement 2025, champion Masahiro Takanashi suffered a severe cervical injury that put him out of action for months. With Takanashi unable to defend the World Ōmori Championship at Utan Festival 2025, Kazuki Hirata faced Antonio Honda to determine an interim champion. Hirata defeated Honda. The following year, with Takanashi still not able to defend the lineal title, Hirata faced Ilusion to determine the new champion. Ilusion won and became the 10th champion.

== Reigns ==
Current champion Ilusion

As of November 8, 2026, there have been a total of ten reigns between ten ine different champions, and one interim reign. The current champion is Ilusion who is in his first reign. He won the title by defeating interim champion Kazuki Hirata at Utan Festa 2026 in Tokyo, Japan, on November 8, 2026.

Key
No.	Overall reign number
Reign	Reign number for the specific champion
Days	Number of days held
Defenses	Number of successful defenses
+	Current reign is changing daily

No.	Champion	Championship change			Reign statistics			Notes	Ref.
No.	Champion	Date	Event	Location	Reign	Days	Defenses	Notes	Ref.
1	The Mac	May 13, 2006	Ōmori Dream Fair Presents DDT Pro-Wrestling in Ōmori	Tokyo, Japan	1	364	0	Defeated Michael Nakazawa, Muscle Sakai, Yusukue Inokuma, Danshoku Dino and Toru Owashi in a battle royal to become the inaugural champion.	
—	Vacated	May 12, 2007	—	—	—	—	—	In storyline, the title was vacated because The Mac had allegedly disappeared to the United States.	
2	Thanomsak Toba	May 12, 2007	Ōmori Dream Fair 2007	Tokyo, Japan	1	22	0	Defeated Ken Ohka, Antonio Honda, Yusuke Inokuma, Poison Sawada Julie, King Ala Moana, Gorgeous Matsuno, Hoshitango, Mango Fukuda, Mecha Mummy and Mecha Mummy Lite in a battle royal to win the vacant title.	
3	Daichi Kakimoto	June 3, 2007	King of DDT 2007	Tokyo, Japan	1	756	1		
—	Vacated	June 28, 2009	—	—	—	—	—	Title officially vacated after it went inactive following Kakimoto's retirement in 2008 and Danshoku Dino got the physical belt back from him.	
4	Danshoku Dino	June 28, 2009	King of DDT 2009	Tokyo, Japan	1	1,939	6	Defeated Antonio Honda, Michael Nakazawa and Rion Mizuki in a four-way match to win the vacant title.	
5	Gurukun Mask	October 19, 2014	Utan Festival 2014	Tokyo, Japan	1	364	0		
6	Makoto Oishi	October 18, 2015	Utan Festival 2015	Tokyo, Japan	1	728	1		
7	Chikara	October 15, 2017	Utan Festival 2017	Tokyo, Japan	1	1,869	1		
8	Soma Takao	November 27, 2022	Utan Festival 2022	Tokyo, Japan	1	714	1		
9	Masahiro Takanashi	November 10, 2024	Utan Festival 2024	Tokyo, Japan	1	728	0		
—	Kazuki Hirata (interim)	November 21, 2025	Utan Festival 2025	Tokyo, Japan	—	352	0	Due to lineal champion Masahiro Takanashi suffering a cervical injury, an interim champion was crowned. Hirata defeated Antonio Honda to become the interim champion.	
10	Ilusion	November 8, 2026	Utan Festival 2026	Tokyo, Japan	1	0+	0	Defeated interim champion Kazuki Hirata to become the new lineal champion.	

== See also ==
- DDT Pro-Wrestling
- Professional wrestling in Japan
