= Umemura PC Juku Copy & Paste Championship =

Professional wrestling championship

Details
- Promotion: DDT Pro-Wrestling
- Date retired: August 23, 2009 (unified with the DDT Extreme Championship)
Statistics
- First champion: Danshoku Dino
- Final champion: Danshoku Dino

The Umemura PC Juku (World) Copy & Paste Championship (Japanese: 梅村パソコン塾認定世界コピー＆ペースト級王座, Hepburn: Umemura Pasokon Juku-nintei Sekai Kopī Ando Pēsuto-kyū Ōza) is an inactive professional wrestling championship in the Japanese promotion DDT Pro-Wrestling. The title was established in 2009 when Umemura PC School, a Japanese cram school specialized in computer science, sponsored a match. The belt was made from a gold painted computer keyboard.

== Title history ==
Danshoku Dino won the title at the "Kyōra Daiyon Kyōsatsu! in Nagoya 2009" event, on July 26, 2009 by defeating Konaka Pahalwan. He then defended it at Ryōgoku Peter Pan on August 23 against Masa Takanashi. The title was then unified with Dino's DDT Extreme Championship.

== Reigns ==
Key
No.	Overall reign number
Reign	Reign number for the specific champion
Days	Number of days held
Defenses	Number of successful defenses

No.	Champion	Championship change			Reign statistics			Notes	Ref.
No.	Champion	Date	Event	Location	Reign	Days	Defenses	Notes	Ref.
1	Danshoku Dino	July 26, 2009	Kyōra Daiyon Kyōsatsu! in Nagoya 2009	Nagoya, Japan	1	28	1	Defeated Konaka Pahalwan to win the inaugural title.	
—	Unified	August 23, 2009	Ryōgoku Peter Pan	—	—	—	—	The title was unified with the DDT Extreme Championship.	

== See also ==
- DDT Pro-Wrestling
- Professional wrestling in Japan
