= Greater China Unified Sichuan Openweight Championship =

Professional wrestling championship

Details
- Promotion: DDT Pro-Wrestling
- Date retired: August 23, 2009 (unified with the DDT Extreme Championship)
Statistics
- First champion: Chōun Shiryu
- Final champion: Danshoku Dino

The Greater China Unified Sichuan Openweight Championship (大中華統一四川流無差別級王座, Daichūka Tōitsu Shisen-ryū Musabetsu-kyū Ōza) was a professional wrestling championship in the Japanese promotion DDT Pro-Wrestling. The title was established in 2009 in DDT's parodic sub-brand New Beijing Pro-Wrestling. The belt was made from cardboard and was supposedly over 4,000 years old.

== Title history ==
In storyline, this title was over 4,000 years old and Choun Shiryu was introduced as the 4,823rd champion. Danshoku Dino captured the title at What Are You Doing? 2009, on July 19. He then defended it at Ryōgoku Peter Pan on August 23 against Masa Takanashi. The title was then unified with Dino's DDT Extreme Championship.

== Reigns ==
Key
No.	Overall reign number
Reign	Reign number for the specific champion
Days	Number of days held
Defenses	Number of successful defenses
N/A	Unknown information

No.	Champion	Championship change			Reign statistics			Notes	Ref.
No.	Champion	Date	Event	Location	Reign	Days	Defenses	Notes	Ref.
Championship history is unrecorded from 1991 BC to 2009.
4823 (1)	Choun Shiryu	—N/a	—N/a	—N/a	1	—N/a	0	Though the circumstances of this title win are fictional, Choun is recognized by DDT as the 4,823rd champion.	
4824 (2)	Danshoku Dino	July 19, 2009	What Are You Doing? 2009	Tokyo, Japan	1	35	1	Dino is recognized by DDT as the 4,824th champion.	
—	Unified	August 23, 2009	—	—	—	—	—	The title was unified with the DDT Extreme Championship.	

== See also ==
- DDT Pro-Wrestling
- Professional wrestling in Japan
