= Danshoku Dino =

Japanese professional wrestler

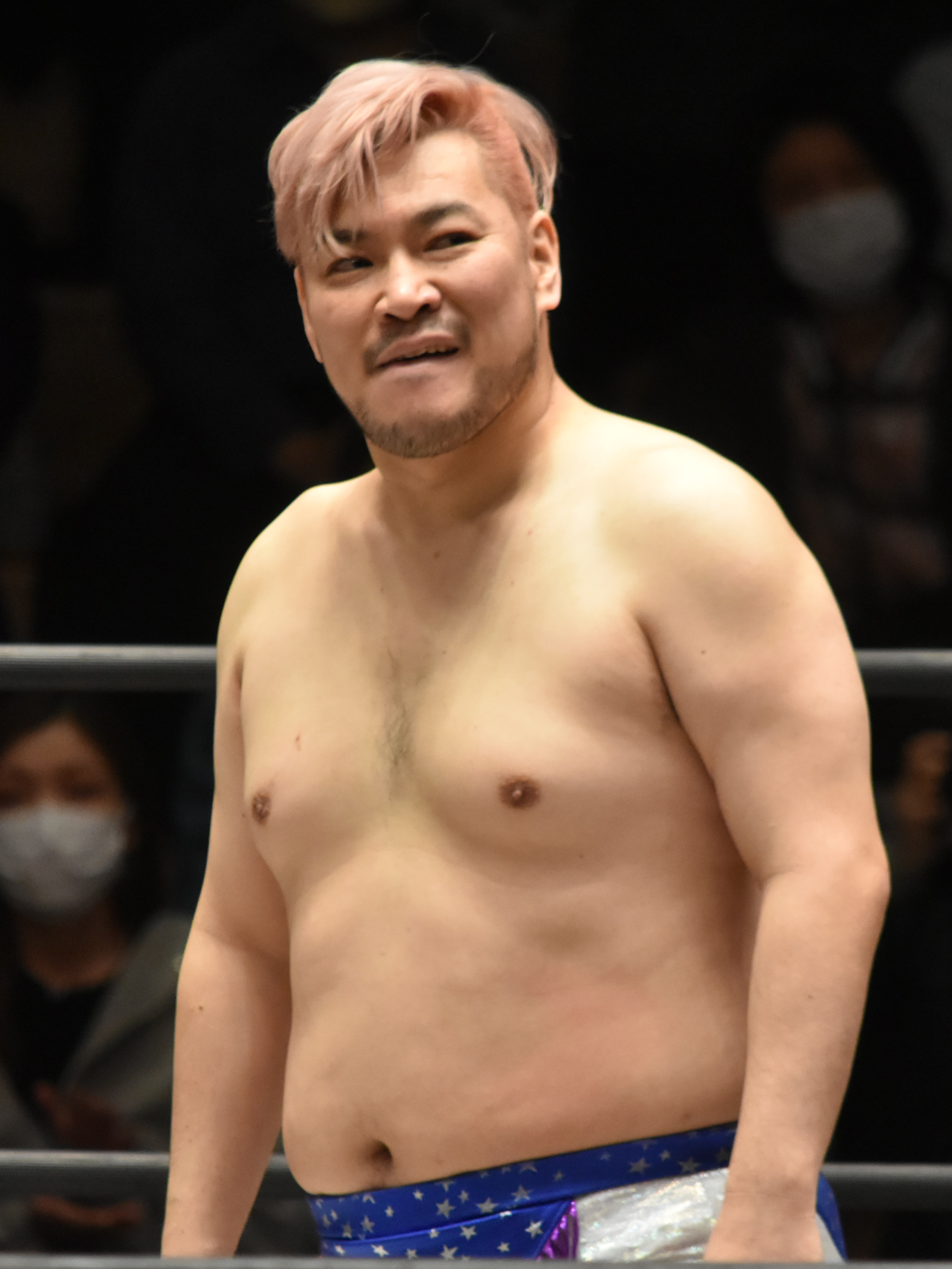
- Dino in April 2021

Personal information
- Born: Aki Miyashita; May 18, 1977 (age 49) Onomichi, Hiroshima, Japan

Professional wrestling career
- Ring names: Danshoku Dino; Danshoku "Dandy" Dino; Danshoku Jinsei; Dinosuke Matsuyama; HHHH; Ishida Mitsunari; Poledust
- Billed height: 1.79 m (5 ft 10 in)
- Billed weight: 103 kg (227 lb)
- Trained by: Sanshiro Takagi
- Debut: April 2, 2002

Aki Miyashita (みやしたあき, Miyashita Aki; born May 18, 1977) is a Japanese professional wrestler better known as Danshoku Dino (男色ディーノ, Danshoku Dīno; lit. "Homosexual Dino", also transliterated as Danshoku Dieno). Miyashita has spent most of his career competing for DDT Pro-Wrestling (DDT), where he plays an overly exaggerated homosexual character. His ring name comes from the character of Baron Dino (男爵ディーノ, Danshaku Dīno) from the manga series Sakigake!! Otokojuku and his gimmick itself is based on openly bisexual Japanese wrestler Men's Teioh.

== Early life ==
In elementary, junior and high school, Miyashita played soccer alongside Keita Kanemoto who was his team captain.

== Professional wrestling career ==
Miyashita was trained in shoot fighting prior to training to be a wrestler and he incorporated this training into his wrestling style.

In addition to wrestling in DDT Pro-Wrestling (DDT), he has also competed in several independent wrestling promotions around Japan, including Dragon Gate, Ice Ribbon, Kaientai Dojo, Osaka Pro Wrestling and Pro Wrestling Zero1-Max. In February 2007, Dino made his first excursion overseas, as he debuted for a few American independent promotions such as Chikara, Combat Zone Wrestling (CZW) and International Wrestling Cartel (IWC).

On April 4, 2019, at DDT Is Coming to America, Dino and Antonio Honda were defeated by Joey Ryan and Royce Isaacs. Later on, he defeated Saki Akai to become the 1,354th Ironman Heavymetalweight Champion, his 23rd reign.

== Championships and accomplishments ==
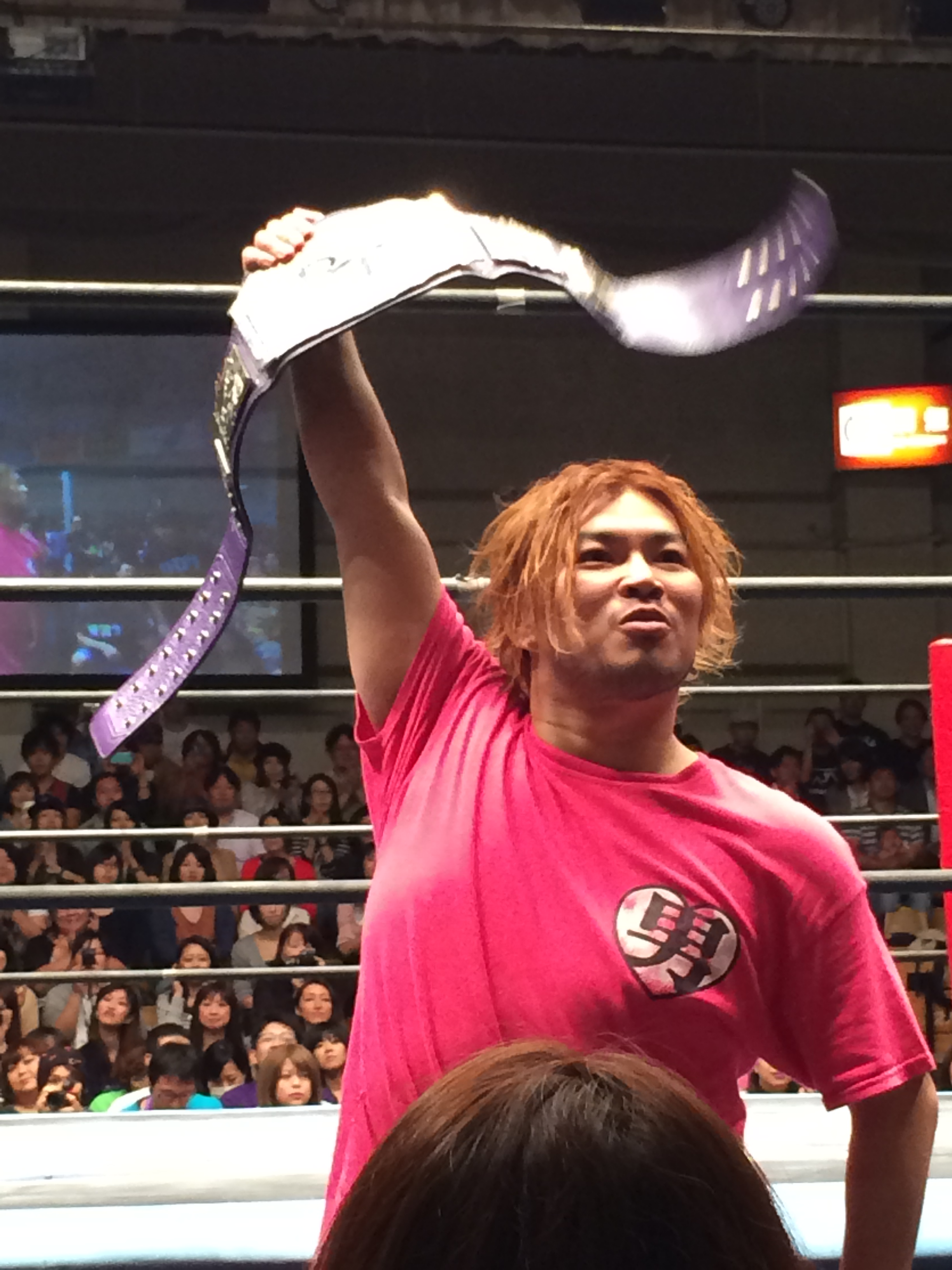
Dino as the DDT Extreme Champion in September 2014

- DDT Pro-Wrestling

- DDT Extreme Championship (9 times)
- DJ Nira World and All Time High Championship (1 time)
- DJ Nira World and History's Strongest Championship (1 time)
- GAY World Anal Championship (2 times)
- Greater China Unified Sichuan Openweight Championship (1 time)
- IMGP World Heavyweight Championship (1 time)
- Ironman Heavymetalweight Championship (54 times - 1 with Mizuki Watase, Antonio Honda, and Yukio Naya)
- JET World Jet Championship (1 time)
- KO-D 10-Man Tag Team Championship (1 time) – with Asuka, Yuki Iino, Mizuki and Trans-Am★Hiroshi
- KO-D 6-Man Tag Team Championship (6 times) – with Kensuke Sasaki and Makoto Oishi (1), Aja Kong and Makoto Oishi (1), Ken Ohka and Super Sasadango Machine (1), Kenso and Super Sasadango Machine (1), Yuki "Sexy" Iino and Yumehito "Fantastic" Imanari (1) and Jun Akiyama and Makoto Oishi
- KO-D Openweight Championship (4 times)
- KO-D Tag Team Championship (3 times) – with Glenn "Q" Spectre (1), Kota Ibushi (1) and Yoshihiro Takayama (1)
- Umemura PC Juku Copy & Paste Championship (1 time)
- UWA World Trios Championship (1 time) – with Hikaru Sato and Masa Takanashi
- World Midbreath Championship (1 time)
- World Ōmori Championship (1 time)
- DDT48 / Dramatic Sousenkyo (2010, 2013, 2017)

- Japan Indie Awards

- Best Unit Award (2015) – with Ken Ohka and Super Sasadango Machine
- Best Unit Award (2021) – with Yuki "Sexy" Iino and Yumehito "Fantastic" Himanari as Pheromones
- Best Unit Award (2022) – with Yuki "Sexy" Iino, Yumehito "Fantastic" Himanari and Koju "Shining Ball" Takeda as Pheromones

- Pro Wrestling Illustrated
  - Ranked No. 367 of the top 500 singles wrestlers in the PWI 500 in 2007

== Luchas de Apuestas record ==
Winner (wager)	Loser (wager)	Location	Event	Date	Notes
Michael Nakazawa & Tomomitsu Matsunaga (hair)	Danshoku Dino & Rion Mizuki (hair)	Korakuen Hall	DDT Day Dream Believer 2007	October 21, 2007	
