= Tokyo Princess Cup =

Tokyo Joshi Pro-Wrestling tournament

- The Tokyo Princess Cup trophy
- Promotions: Tokyo Joshi Pro-Wrestling
- First event: 2014
- Signature matches: None time-limited singles matches

Tokyo Princess Cup (Japanese: 東京プリンセスカップ, Hepburn: Tōkyō Purinsesukappu) is an annual single-elimination tournament created and promoted by the Japanese professional wrestling promotion Tokyo Joshi Pro-Wrestling (TJPW). The event has been held since 2014 and would later become available as an internet pay-per-view on TJPW's streaming service Wrestle Universe.

At first, the winner of the tournament received an opportunity to produce an TJPW's event, however, since 2016, it was decided that the winner of the tournament would receive a future title match for the Princess of Princess Championship, which was previously known as the Tokyo Princess of Princess Championship, as it was established in 2016.

== Events ==
As of 2023, there have been a total of 10 events, where the tournament being held in multi-day event.

No.	Event	Date	City	Venue	Ref(s)
1	Tokyo Princess Cup	June 22 – August 2, 2014	Tokyo, Japan	Various	
2	Tokyo Princess Cup 2015	July 4 – August 8, 2015	Various	Various	
3	Tokyo Princess Cup 2016	July 9 – August 13, 2016	Various	Various	
4	Tokyo Princess Cup 2017	July 2–30, 2017	Various	Various	
5	Tokyo Princess Cup 2018	June 3 – July 8, 2018	Tokyo, Japan	Various	
6	Tokyo Princess Cup 2019	May 25 – July 7, 2019	Tokyo, Japan	Various	
7	Tokyo Princess Cup 2020	August 8–20, 2020	Tokyo, Japan	Various	
8	Tokyo Princess Cup 2021	July 22 – August 15, 2021	Tokyo, Japan	Various	
9	Tokyo Princess Cup 2022	July 16 – August 14, 2022	Tokyo, Japan	Various	
10	Tokyo Princess Cup 2023	July 15 – August 13, 2023	Tokyo, Japan	Various	
11	Tokyo Princess Cup 2024	July 28 – August 25, 2024	Various	Various	
12	Tokyo Princess Cup 2025	July 27 – August 23, 2025	Various	Various	
13	Tokyo Princess Cup 2026	July 20 – August 23, 2026	Various	Various	

== Stats ==
=== List of winners ===
Year	Tournament				Princess of Princess Championship match		
Year	Winner	Runner-up	Times won	No. of entrants	Match	Result	Ref
2014	Nonoko	Shoko Nakajima	1	8	None		
2015	Shoko Nakajima	Akane Miura	1	8	None		
2016	Yuu	Shoko Nakajima	1	12	vs. Miyu Yamashita at Shinjuku Love Rin	Won	
2017	Reika Saiki	Yuka Sakazaki	1	13	vs. Yuka Sakazaki at Brand New Wrestling ~ The Beginning of a New Era ~	Won	
2018	Yuu	Yuka Sakazaki	2	16	vs. Miyu Yamashita at Brand New Wrestling 2 ~ Now it's Time to Attack ~	Lost	
2019	Mizuki	Yuna Manase	1	16	vs. Shoko Nakajima at The Mountain Top 2019 ~ I Will Not Lose to Anyone ~	Lost	
2020	Mizuki	Shoko Nakajima	2	21	vs. Yuka Sakazaki at Wrestle Princess I	Lost	
2021	Maki Itoh	Shoko Nakajima	1	23	vs. Miyu Yamashita at Wrestle Princess II	Lost	
2022	Yuka Sakazaki	Miu Watanabe	1	19	vs. Shoko Nakajima at Wrestle Princess III	Won	
2023	Miyu Yamashita	Yuki Kamifuku	1	16	vs. Mizuki at Wrestle Princess IV	Won	
2024	Ryo Mizunami	Yuki Aino	1	19	vs. Miu Watanabe at Wrestle Princess V	Lost	
2025	Miu Watanabe	Arisu Endo	1	16	vs. Mizuki at Wrestle Princess VI	Won	
2026	Suzume	Rika Tatsumi	1	24	vs. Yuki Arai at Wrestle Princess VII	Lost	

== Tournament brackets ==
=== 2014 ===
The inaugural edition of the Cup took place between June 22 and August 2, 2014.

Round 1
Nonoko	Pin
Chikage Kiba	6:26
Kanna	4:30
Yuka Sakazaki	Pin
Shoko Nakajima	Pin
Ai Shimizu	7:11
Miyu Yamashita	Pin
Erin	4:37

Semifinal
Nonoko	Pin
Yuka Sakazaki	8:46
Shoko Nakajima	Pin
Miyu Yamashita	6:55

Final
Nonoko	Pin
Shoko Nakajima	8:04

=== 2015 ===
The 2015 edition of the Cup took place between July 4 and August 8.

Round 1
Miyu Yamashita	Pin
Yuka Sakazaki	6:26
Ai Shimizu	7:24
Akane Miura	Pin
Kanna	Pin
Hyper Misao	6:53
Nonoko	8:43
Shoko Nakajima	Pin

Semifinal
Miyu Yamashita	6:52
Akane Miura	Pin
Kanna	8:34
Shoko Nakajima	Pin

Final
Akane Miura	13:36
Shoko Nakajima	Pin

=== 2016 ===
The 2016 edition of the Cup took place between July 9 and August 13.

First round
Akane Miura	Pin
Nonoko	6:15
Nodoka Oneesan	5:40
Yuu	Pin
Hyper Misao	Pin
Miyu Yamashita	11:05
Marika Kobashi	8:59
Yuka Sakazaki	Pin

Quarterfinals
Akane Miura	Pin
Rika Tatsumi	7:20
Yuu	Pin
Azusa Takigawa	6:47
Hyper Misao	Pin
Kanna	5:25
Yuka Sakazaki	21:06
Shoko Nakajima	Pin

Semifinals
Akane Miura	7:31
Yuu	Pin
Hyper Misao	7:46
Shoko Nakajima	Pin

Finals
Yuu	Pin
Shoko Nakajima	17:12

=== 2017 ===
The 2017 edition of the Cup took place between July 2 and 30.

First round
Reika Saiki	Pin
Nodoka Oneesan	5:32
Maho Kurone	8:23
Shoko Nakajima	Pin
Mizuki	Pin
Nonoko	6:25
Rika Tatsumi	Pin
Yuna Manase	7:52
Miyu Yamashita	17:15
Yuka Sakazaki	Pin

Quarterfinals
Reika Saiki	Pin
Yuu	7:58
Shoko Nakajima	Pin
Maki Itoh	11:48
Mizuki	Pin
Azusa Takigawa	9:35
Rika Tatsumi	19:16
Yuka Sakazaki	Pin

Semifinals
Reika Saiki	Pin
Shoko Nakajima	10:23
Mizuki	9:03
Yuka Sakazaki	Pin

Finals
Reika Saiki	Pin
Yuka Sakazaki	10:47

=== 2018 ===
The 2018 edition of the Cup took place between June 3 and July 8.

Round 1
Yuka Sakazaki	Pin
Mizuki	18:10
Marika Kobashi	N/A
Hikari	Forfeit
Rika Tatsumi	Pin
Azusa Christie	10:23
Maho Kurone	N/A
Shoko Nakajima	Forfeit
Nodoka Oneesan	Pin
Yuna Manase	7:58
Maki Itoh	12:01
Miyu Yamashita	Pin
Hyper Misao	DQ
Sakisama	10:01
Reika Saiki	11:55
Yuu	Pin

Round 2
Yuka Sakazaki	Pin
Hikari	18:10
Rika Tatsumi	Pin
Shoko Nakajima	15:31
Nodoka Oneesan	Pin
Miyu Yamashita	7:58
Hyper Misao	12:46
Yuu	Pin

Semifinal
Yuka Sakazaki	Pin
Rika Tatsumi	13:25
Nodoka Oneesan	7:38
Yuu	TKO

Final
Yuka Sakazaki	9:44
Yuu	Pin

=== 2019 ===
The 2019 edition of the Cup took place between May 25 and July 7.

Round 1
Mizuki	Pin
Miyu Yamashita	11:10
Yuki Kamifuku	12:01
Shoko Nakajima	Pin
Maki Itoh	Pin
Raku	6:16
Hikari Noa	10:15
Natsumi Maki	Pin
Yuka Sakazaki	Pin
Mina Shirakawa	9:36
Nodoka Oneesan	7:56
Miu Watanabe	Pin
Rika Tatsumi	Pin
Himawari Unagi	7:52
Yuki Aino	6:06
Yuna Manase	Pin

Round 2
Mizuki	Pin
Shoko Nakajima	14:32
Maki Itoh	9:15
Natsumi Maki	Pin
Yuka Sakazaki	Pin
Miu Watanabe	12:53
Rika Tatsumi	11:02
Yuna Manase	Pin

Semifinal
Mizuki	Pin
Natsumi Maki	7:24
Yuka Sakazaki	10:51
Yuna Manase	Pin

Final
Mizuki	Pin
Yuna Manase	17:05

=== 2020 ===
The 2020 edition of the Cup took place between 8 and 29 August.

Round 1
Suzume	Pin
Haruna Neko	6:06
Maki Itoh	Pin
Himawari Unagi	5:45
Miyu Yamashita	Pin
Raku	8:19
Yuka Sakazaki	Pin
Nodoka Tenma	14:18
Natsumi Maki	Pin
Mina Shirakawa	7:43

Round 2
Suzume	7:46
Mizuki	Pin
Rika Tatsumi	13:36
Yuki Aino	Pin
Miu Watanabe	Pin
Mirai Maiumi	9:20
Yuki Kamifuku	7:32
Maki Itoh	Pin
Miyu Yamashita	Pin
Hikari Noa	10:22
Hyper Misao	Pin
Yuka Sakazaki	15:42
Natsumi Maki	Pin
Pom Harajuku	4:41
Mahiro Kiryu	10:37
Shoko Nakajima	Pin

Quarterfinals
Mizuki	Pin
Yuki Aino	11:27
Miu Watanabe	7:32
Maki Itoh	Pin
Miyu Yamashita	Pin
Hyper Misao	10:22
Natsumi Maki	10:49
Shoko Nakajima	Pin

Semifinals
Mizuki	Pin
Maki Itoh	12:59
Miyu Yamashita	15:34
Shoko Nakajima	Pin

Final
Mizuki	Pin
Shoko Nakajima	16:23

=== 2021 ===
The 2021 edition of the Cup took place between July 22 and August 15.

Round 1
Raku	Pin
Moka Miyamoto	6:01
Mahiro Kiryu	Pin
Arisu Endo	9:00
Miyu Yamashita	Pin
Nao Kakuta	11:27
Pom Harajuku	8:31
Mirai Maiumi	Pin
Kaya Toribami	6:36
Miu Watanabe	Pin
Yuki Aino	Pin
Yuki Arai	8:26
Rika Tatsumi	Pin
Hikari Noa	14:14
Marika Kobashi	Pin
Nodoka Tenma	7:52

Round 2
Raku	9:03
Maki Itoh	Pin
Mahiro Kiryu	7:53
Suzume	Pin
Miyu Yamashita	Pin
Yuki Kamifuku	11:35
Mirai Maiumi	12:45
Mizuki	Pin
Haruna Neko	7:22
Yuki Aino	Pin
Rika Tatsumi	Pin
Hyper Misao	15:03
Marika Kobashi	5:41
Shoko Nakajima	Pin

Quarterfinals
Maki Itoh	Pin
Suzume	11:32
Miyu Yamashita	14:31
Mizuki	Pin
Miu Watanabe	Pin
Yuki Aino	12:15
Rika Tatsumi	13:21
Shoko Nakajima	Pin

Semifinals
Maki Itoh	Pin
Mizuki	18:39
Miu Watanabe	12:27
Shoko Nakajima	Pin

Final
Maki Itoh	Pin
Shoko Nakajima	23:21

=== 2022 ===
The 2022 edition of the Cup took place between July 16 and August 14.

Round 1
Yuka Sakazaki	Pin
Kaya Toribami	10:05
Yuki Arai	Pin
Mahiro Kiryu	8:00
Rika Tatsumi	Pin
Yuki Kamifuku	12:57
Pom Harajuku	Pin
Moka Miyamoto	6:48
Miyu Yamashita	Pin
Hyper Misao	15:47
Yuki Aino	10:39
Nao Kakuta	Pin
Shoko Nakajima	Pin
Haruna Neko	11:15
Arisu Endo	11:14
Miu Watanabe	Pin

Round 2
Yuki Arai	10:44
Hikari Noa	Pin
Pom Harajuku	9:29
Suzume	Pin
Miyu Yamashita	Pin
Raku	9:23

Quarterfinals
Yuka Sakazaki	Pin
Hikari Noa	12:55
Rika Tatsumi	11:10
Suzume	Pin
Miyu Yamashita	Pin
Nao Kakuta	9:21
Shoko Nakajima	16:34
Miu Watanabe	Pin

Semifinals
Yuka Sakazaki	Pin
Suzume	11:56
Miyu Yamashita	18:23
Miu Watanabe	Pin

Final
Yuka Sakazaki	Pin
Miu Watanabe	19:36

=== 2023 ===
The 2023 edition of the Cup took place between July 15 and August 13.

Round 1
Miyu Yamashita	Pin
Mizuki	16:11
Moka Miyamoto	Pin
Hyper Misao	9:36
Yuki Arai	Pin
Hikari Noa	11:43
Arisu Endo	Pin
Mahiro Kiryu	9:56
Suzume	13:52
Shoko Nakajima	Pin
Raku	10:37
Rika Tatsumi	Pin
Yuki Aino	15:10
Miu Watanabe	Pin
Nao Kakuta	9:56
Yuki Kamifuku	Pin

Quarterfinals
Miyu Yamashita	Pin
Moka Miyamoto	12:55
Yuki Arai	Pin
Arisu Endo	13:01
Shoko Nakajima	19:10
Rika Tatsumi	Pin
Miu Watanabe	12:22
Yuki Kamifuku	Pin

Semifinals
Miyu Yamashita	Pin
Yuki Arai	13:18
Rika Tatsumi	12:39
Yuki Kamifuku	Pin

Final
Miyu Yamashita	Pin
Yuki Kamifuku	15:57

=== 2024 ===
The 2024 edition of the Cup took place between July 28 and August 25.

Round 1
Yuki Kamifuku	Pin
Pom Harajuku	6:58
Yuki Aino	Pin
Runa Okubo	4:56
Mizuki	Pin
Moka Miyamoto	12:28
Miu Watanabe	Pin
Arisu Endo	14:38
Yuki Arai	Pin
Kaya Toribami	8:38
Shino Suzuki	7:09
Suzume	Pin
Rika Tatsumi	Pin
Toga	7:58
Haru Kazashiro	7:10
Ryo Mizunami	Pin

Round 2
Yuki Aino	Pin
Shoko Nakajima	16:54
Zara Zakher	Pin
Miu Watanabe	12:45
Yuki Arai	Pin
Wakana Uehara	9:23

Quarterfinals
Yuki Kamifuku	11:10
Yuki Aino	Pin
Mizuki	9:46
Zara Zakher	Pin
Yuki Arai	Pin
Suzume	11:10
Rika Tatsumi	12:33
Ryo Mizunami	Pin

Semifinals
Yuki Aino	Pin
Zara Zakher	8:14
Yuki Arai	13:35
Ryo Mizunami	Pin

Final
Yuki Aino	13:47
Ryo Mizunami	Pin

=== 2025 ===
The 2025 edition of the Cup took place between July 27 and August 23.

Round 1
Raku	12:49
Miu Watanabe	Pin
Himawari	8:47
Haru Kazashiro	Pin
Moka Miyamoto	Forfeit^{1}
Miyu Yamashita	Bye
Arisu Endo	Pin
Hyper Misao	12:15
Mizuki	Pin
Yuki Aino	13:45
Shoko Nakajima	Pin
Rika Tatsumi	15:19
Suzume	9:24
Wakana Uehara	Pin
Yuki Kamifuku	9:46
Yuki Arai	Pin

Quarterfinals
Miu Watanabe	12:55
Haru Kazashiro	Sub
Miyu Yamashita	12:38
Arisu Endo	Pin
Mizuki	18:32
Shoko Nakajima	Pin
Wakana Uehara	9:39
Yuki Arai	Sub

Semifinals
Miu Watanabe	24:41
Shoko Nakajima	Pin
Arisu Endo	14:41
Yuki Arai	Pin

Final
Miu Watanabe	20:21
Arisu Endo	Pin

1 Miyamoto forfeited her first-round match to Yamashita due to illness.

=== 2026 ===
The 2026 edition of the Cup took place between July 20 and August 23.

Round 1
Uta Takami	8:27
Miyu Yamashita	Pin
Raku	8:44
Mizuki	Pin
Arisu Endo	Pin
Sakura Hattori	10:48
Wakana Uehara	Pin
Mifu Ashida	7:37
Toga	Sub
Momo Sato	5:12
Miu Watanabe	Sub
Ren Konatsu	11:50
Suzume	Sub
Shion Kanzaki	8:48
Haru Kazashiro	9:40
Yuki Arai	Sub

Round 2
Rika Tatsumi	Sub
Miyu Yamashita	17:47
Hyper Misao	Pin
Mizuki	13:58
Chika Nanase	8:40
Arisu Endo	Sub
Himawari	Pin
Wakana Uehara	11:28
Mahiro Kiryu	7:57
Toga	Pin
Yuki Aino	Sub
Miu Watanabe	16:51
Pom Harajuku	9:23
Suzume	Pin
Shoko Nakajima	Pin
Yuki Arai	15:32

Quarterfinals
Rika Tatsumi	Sub
Hyper Misao	13:49
Arisu Endo	10:35
Himawari	Pin
Toga	Sub
Yuki Aino	10:32
Suzume	Pin
Shiko Nakajima	16:58

Semifinals
Rika Tatsumi	Pin
Himawari	12:35
Toga	14:23
Suzume	Pin

Final
Rika Tatsumi	20:46
Suzume	Pin
