= Wrestle Princess VI =

2025 Tokyo Joshi Pro-Wrestling event

- Promotional poster featuring multiple competitors
- Promotion: CyberFight
- Brand: Tokyo Joshi Pro-Wrestling
- Date: September 20, 2025
- City: Tokyo, Japan
- Venue: Ota City General Gymnasium
- Attendance: 1,127

Pay-per-view chronology
← Previous; TJPW Go Girl 6	Next → —

Wrestle Princess chronology
← Previous; V	Next → VII

Wrestle Princess VI was a professional wrestling event promoted by CyberFight's sub-brand Tokyo Joshi Pro-Wrestling. It was the sixth annual Wrestle Princess and took place on September 20, 2025, in Tokyo, Japan, at the Ota City General Gymnasium. The event aired on CyberAgent's AbemaTV online linear television service and CyberFight's streaming service Wrestle Universe.

== Background ==
=== Storylines ===
The event featured ten professional wrestling matches that resulted from scripted storylines, where wrestlers portrayed villains, heroes, or less distinguishable characters in the scripted events that built tension and culminated in a wrestling match or series of matches.

=== Event ===
The event started with the tag team confrontation between Suzume and Ren Konatsu, and Mei Suruga and Uta Takami, solded with the victory of the latters. Next up, Mahiro Kiryu won a battle royal disputed for the Ironman Heavymetalweight Championship. The third bout saw Aja Kong picking up a victory over Himawari in singles competition. In the fourth bout, Pom Harajuku defeated Rika Tatsumi in a deathmatch. Next up, Hiroyo Matsumoto and Yuki Arai defeated Haru Kazashiro and Toga in tag team competition. In the sixth match, Ryo Mizunami and Yuki Aino defeated Miyu Yamashita and Kaya Toribami in tag team competition. The seventh bout saw Arisu Endo defeat Priscilla Kelly to win the vacant International Princess Championship. In the semi main event, Yuki Kamifuku and Wakana Uehara defeated Shoko Nakajima and Hyper Misao to win the Princess Tag Team Championship, ending the latter team's reign at 188 days and three defenses.

In the main event, Miu Watanabe defeated Mizuki to win the Princess of Princess Championship, ending the latter's reign at 259 days and three defenses. The bout represented Watanabe's 2025 Tokyo Princess Cup cash-in. After the bout concluded, Watanabe was challengd by Yuki Aino.

== Results ==
No.	Results	Stipulations	Times
1	Mei Suruga and Uta Takami defeated Suzume and Ren Konatsu by submission	Tag team match	12:55
2	Mahiro Kiryu defeated Pokotan (c), Ram Kaicho, Raku, Shino Suzuki, Mifu Ashida, Kira Summer and Chika Nanase	Battle royal for the Ironman Heavymetalweight Championship	15:21
3	Aja Kong defeated Himawari by pinfall	Singles match	8:53
4	Pom Harajuku defeated Rika Tatsumi (Note: Tatsumi was initially scheduled to face Priscilla Kelly in singles competition, but the latter was moved to the International Princess Championship match due to original challegner Jada Stone being sidelined with a knee injury.) by pinfall	Capture The Flag Scramble Authorized Weapons Deathmatch	11:01
5	Hiroyo Matsumoto and Yuki Arai defeated Haru Kazashiro and Toga by pinfall	Tag team match	13:52
6	Ryo Mizunami and Yuki Aino defeated Miyu Yamashita and Kaya Toribami by submission	Tag team match	13:11
7	Arisu Endo defeated Priscilla Kelly by pinfall	Decision match for the vacant International Princess Championship	10:59
8	Ober Eats (Yuki Kamifuku and Wakana Uehara) defeated Kyoraku Kyomei (Shoko Nakajima and Hyper Misao) (c) by pinfall	Tag team match for the Princess Tag Team Championship	17:02
9	Miu Watanabe defeated Mizuki (c) by pinfall	Singles match for the Princess of Princess Championship	22:58
(c) / – the champion(s) heading into the match
