= Wrestle Princess VII =

2026 Tokyo Joshi Pro-Wrestling event

- Promotional poster featuring multiple competitors
- Promotion: CyberFight
- Brand: Tokyo Joshi Pro-Wrestling
- Date: October 3, 2026
- City: Tokyo, Japan
- Venue: Ota City General Gymnasium
- Attendance: 1,357

Pay-per-view chronology
← Previous; Summer Sun Princess	Next → —

Wrestle Princess chronology
← Previous; VI	Next → —

Wrestle Princess VII was a professional wrestling event promoted by CyberFight's sub-brand Tokyo Joshi Pro-Wrestling. It was the seventh annual Wrestle Princess and took place on October 3, 2026, in Tokyo, Japan, at the Ota City General Gymnasium. The event aired on CyberAgent's AbemaTV online linear television service and CyberFight's streaming service Wrestle Universe.

== Background ==
=== Storylines ===
The event featured ten professional wrestling matches that resulted from scripted storylines, where wrestlers portrayed villains, heroes, or less distinguishable characters in the scripted events that built tension and culminated in a wrestling match or series of matches.

=== Event ===
The event started with the singles confrontation between Ren Konatsu and Uta Takami, solded with the victory of the latter. Next up, Himawari, Shino Suzuki, and Mifu Ashida picked up a victory over Shion Kanzaki, Momo Sato, and Chieri Sakimori in six-woman tag team competition. The third bout saw Raku and Minimo defeat the teams of Mahiro Kiryu and Tama, and Pom Harajuku and Pokotan in three-way tag team competition. Next up, Aja Kong, Sakura Hattori, and Kumadori defeated Chris Brookes, Kira Summer, and Chika Nanase in six-person tag team competition. In the fifth match, Yuki Kamifuku and Veny picked up a victory over Wakana Uehara and Toga in tag team competition. Next up, Mizuki defeated Hyper Misao in singles competition. In the seventh bout, Shoko Nakajima defeated Zara Zakher to retain the Setup All Asia Women's Championship, a title promoted by Setup Thailand Pro Wrestling (STPW). Next up, Miyu Yamashita defeated Arisu Endo to retain Pro-Wrestling: EVE's International Championship. In the semi main event, Haru Kazashiro and Yuki Aino defeated Miu Watanabe and Rika Tatsumi to win the Princess Tag Team Championship, ending the latter team's reign at 152 days and two defenses.

In the main event, Yuki Arai defeated Suzume to secure the fifth consecutive defense of the Princess of Princess Championship in that respective reign.

== Results ==
No.	Results	Stipulations	Times
1	Uta Takami defeated Ren Konatsu by submission	Singles match	8:25
2	Mifu Ashida and Bumping gRitters (Himawari and Shino Suzuki) and defeated Shion Kanzalo, Momo Sato, and Chieri Sakimori, by submission	Six-woman tag team match	11:25
3	Raku and Minimo defeated Pom Harajuku and Pokotan, and Mahiro Kiryu and Tama by pinfall	Three-way tag team match	10:43
4	Aja Kong, Sakura Hattori, and Kumadori defeated Chris Brookes, Kira Summer, and Chika Nanase by pinfall	Six-person mixed tag team match	13:25
5	Yuki Kamifuku and Veny defeated Wakana Uehara and Toga by pinfall	Tag team match	12:27
6	Mizuki defeated Hyper Misao by pinfall	Singles match Jushin Thunder Liger served as the special guest referee.	10:23
7	Shoko Nakajima (c) defeated Zara Zakher by pinfall	Singles match for the Setup All Asia Women's Championship	12:23
8	Miyu Yamashita (c) defeated Arisu Endo by pinfall	Singles match for the Pro-Wrestling: EVE International Championship	10:31
9	Shunrai Rekka Prism Greed (Haru Kazashiro and Yuki Aino) defeated Hakuchumu (Miu Watanabe and Rika Tatsumi) (c) by pinfall	Tag team match for the Princess Tag Team Championship	19:58
10	Yuki Arai (c) defeated Suzume by pinfall	Singles match for the Princess of Princess Championship	21:51
(c) / – the champion(s) heading into the match
