= Wrestle Princess V =

2024 Tokyo Joshi Pro-Wrestling event

- Promotional poster featuring Miu Watanabe and Ryo Mizunami
- Promotion: CyberFight
- Brand: Tokyo Joshi Pro-Wrestling
- Date: September 22, 2024
- City: Chiba, Japan
- Venue: Makuhari Messe Hall
- Attendance: 756

Pay-per-view chronology
← Previous; Always Be A Challenger '24	Next → Bright Eyes

Wrestle Princess chronology
← Previous; IV	Next → VI

Wrestle Princess V was a professional wrestling event promoted by CyberFight's sub-brand Tokyo Joshi Pro-Wrestling. It was the fifth annual Wrestle Princess and took place on September 22, 2024, in Chiba, Japan, at the Makuhari Messe Hall. The event aired on CyberAgent's AbemaTV online linear television service and CyberFight's streaming service Wrestle Universe.

== Background ==
=== Storylines ===
The event featured ten professional wrestling matches that resulted from scripted storylines, where wrestlers portrayed villains, heroes, or less distinguishable characters in the scripted events that built tension and culminated in a wrestling match or series of matches.

=== Event ===
The event started with the singles confrontation between Runa Okubo and Haru Kazashiro solded with the victory of the latter. In the second bout, Yoshiko Hasegawa, Kaya Toribami and Himawari picked up a victory over Kira Summer, Chika Nanase and Uta Takami in six-woman tag team competition. Next up, Sho Sekiguchi and Mahiro Kiryu defeated Wakana Uehara and Toga in tag team action. The fourth bout saw Ram Kaicho outmatching Raku. Next up, Aja Kong, Max the Impaler and Pom Harajuku defeated Rika Tatsumi, Yuki Aino and Shino Suzuki in six-woman tag team competition. Next up, All Elite Wrestling's Emi Sakura defeated Shoko Nakajima in singles competition. In the seventh bout, Xia Zhao and Mizuki teamed up to defeat Yuki Kamifuku and Veny. The eighth bout saw Yuki Arai defeating Moka Miyamoto to secure the fifth consecutive defense of the International Princess Championship in the respective reign which was a record setter at the time. In the semi main event, Miyu Yamashita and Maki Itoh defeated Arisu Endo and Suzume to win the Princess Tag Team Championship, ending the latter team's reign at 175 days and two defenses.

In the main event, Miu Watanabe defeated 2024 Tokyo Princess Cup winner Ryo Mizunami to secure the fourth consecutive defense of the Princess of Princess Championship in that respective reign.

== Results ==
No.	Results	Stipulations	Times
1	Haru Kazashiro defeated Runa Okubo	Singles match	6:25
2	Yoshiko Hasegawa, Kaya Toribami and Himawari defeated Kira Summer, Chika Nanase and Uta Takami	Six-woman tag team match	10:13
3	Sho Sekiguchi and Mahiro Kiryu defeated Wakana Uehara and Toga	Tag team match	9:41
4	Ram Kaicho defeated Raku	Singles match	7:01
5	Aja Kong, Max the Impaler and Pom Harajuku defeated Rika Tatsumi, Yuki Aino and Shino Suzuki	Six-woman tag team match	14:55
6	Emi Sakura defeated Shoko Nakajima	Singles match	13:47
7	Xia Zhao and Mizuki defeated Yuki Kamifuku and Veny	Tag team match	12:50
8	Yuki Arai (c) defeated Moka Miyamoto	Singles match for the International Princess Championship	15:33
9	121000000 (Miyu Yamashita and Maki Itoh) defeated Daisy Monkey (Arisu Endo and Suzume) (c)	Tag team match for the Princess Tag Team Championship	23:22
10	Miu Watanabe (c) defeated Ryo Mizunami	Singles match for the Princess of Princess Championship	21:19
(c) / – the champion(s) heading into the match
