= Mahiro Kiryu =

Japanese professional wrestler

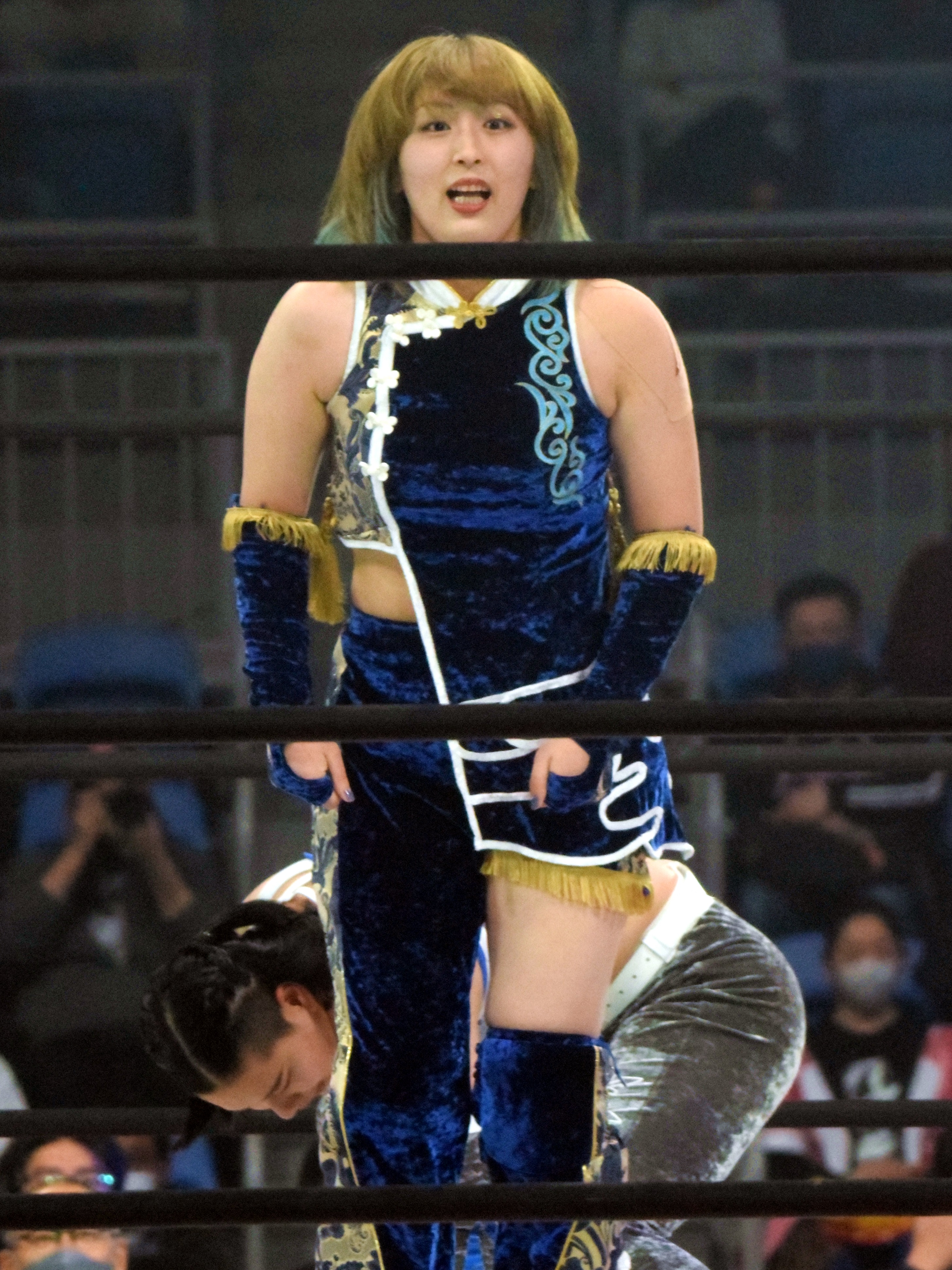
- Kiryu in March 2023

Personal information
- Born: 13 July 1992 (age 34) Gunma, Japan

Professional wrestling career
- Ring name: Mahiro Kiryu
- Billed height: 166 cm (5 ft 5 in)
- Trained by: Tokyo Joshi Pro-Wrestling
- Debut: 2019

Mahiro Kiryu (桐生真弥, Kiryu Mahiro) is a Japanese professional wrestler signed to Tokyo Joshi Pro-Wrestling (TJPW). She is also known for sporadically competing in various promotions from the Japanese independent scene.

== Professional wrestling career ==
=== Tokyo Joshi Pro-Wrestling (2019–present) ===
Kiryu made her professional wrestling debut in Tokyo Joshi Pro-Wrestling at TJPW Be Updated To The Future, The Future, The Future on February 23, 2019, where she teamed up with Himawari Unagi in a losing effort against Mina Shirakawa and Shoko Nakajima in tag team competition. During her time with the promotion, she challenged for several championships. She competed in a tournament for the vacant International Princess Championship in which she fell short to Mirai Maiumi in the first rounds from TJPW Fall Tour '20 ~ WOMM on October 10, 2020. At Wrestle Princess IV on October 9, 2023, she teamed up with "Toyo Mates" tag team partner Yuki Kamifuku to unsuccessfully challenge Free WiFi (Hikari Noa and Nao Kakuta) for the vacant Princess Tag Team Championship. She won the first championship of her career, the Ironman Heavymetalweight Championship, at the finals of the 2025 Tokyo Princess Cup from August 23, by pinning Ram Kaicho in a battle royal.

Kiryu competed in various signature events of the promotion. In the Tokyo Princess Cup, she made her debut at the 2020 edition where she fell short to Shoko Nakajima in the second rounds after receiving a bye. At the 2021 edition, she defeated Arisu Endo in the first rounds, then fell short to Suzume in the second ones. At the 2023 edition, she fell short to Arisu Endo in the first rounds.

In the Wrestle Princess series of events, Kiryu made her first appearance at the first-ever event from November 7, 2020, where she teamed up with Pom Harajuku to defeat Haruna Neko and Marika Kobashi. At Wrestle Princess II on October 9, 2021, she teamed up with Haruna Neko and Kaya Toribami in a losing effort against Ram Kaicho, Raku and Pom Harajuku. At Wrestle Princess III on October 9, 2022, she teamed up with Yuki Kamifuku and Haruna Neko in a losing effort against Nao Kakuta, Yoshiko Hasegawa and Yuna Manase. At Wrestle Princess VI on September 20, 2025, she won the Ironman Heavymetalweight Championship for the second time after emerging victorious from another battle royal.

=== Independent circuit (2019–present) ===
Kiryu often competes in promotions from various independent scenes as developmental talent sent by TJPW. She made her first appearance in the CyberFight Festival series of events co-promoted by TJPW, DDT and Noah at the first-ever pay-per-view of its kind from June 6, 2021, where she teamed up with Nao Kakuta, Raku, Pom Harajuku and Kaya Toribami in a losing effort against BeeStar (Mirai Maiumi and Suzume), Haruna Neko, Moka Miyamoto and Arisu Endo. At CyberFight Festival 2022 on June 12, she teamed up with Nao Kakuta, Moka Miyamoto, Arisu Endo and Kaya Toribami to defeat Hyper Misao, Yuki Aino, Yuuri, Pom Harajuku and Haruna Neko.

== Championships and accomplishments ==
- DDT Pro-Wrestling
  - Ironman Heavymetalweight Championship (16 times)
