= Maho Kurone =

Japanese professional wrestler

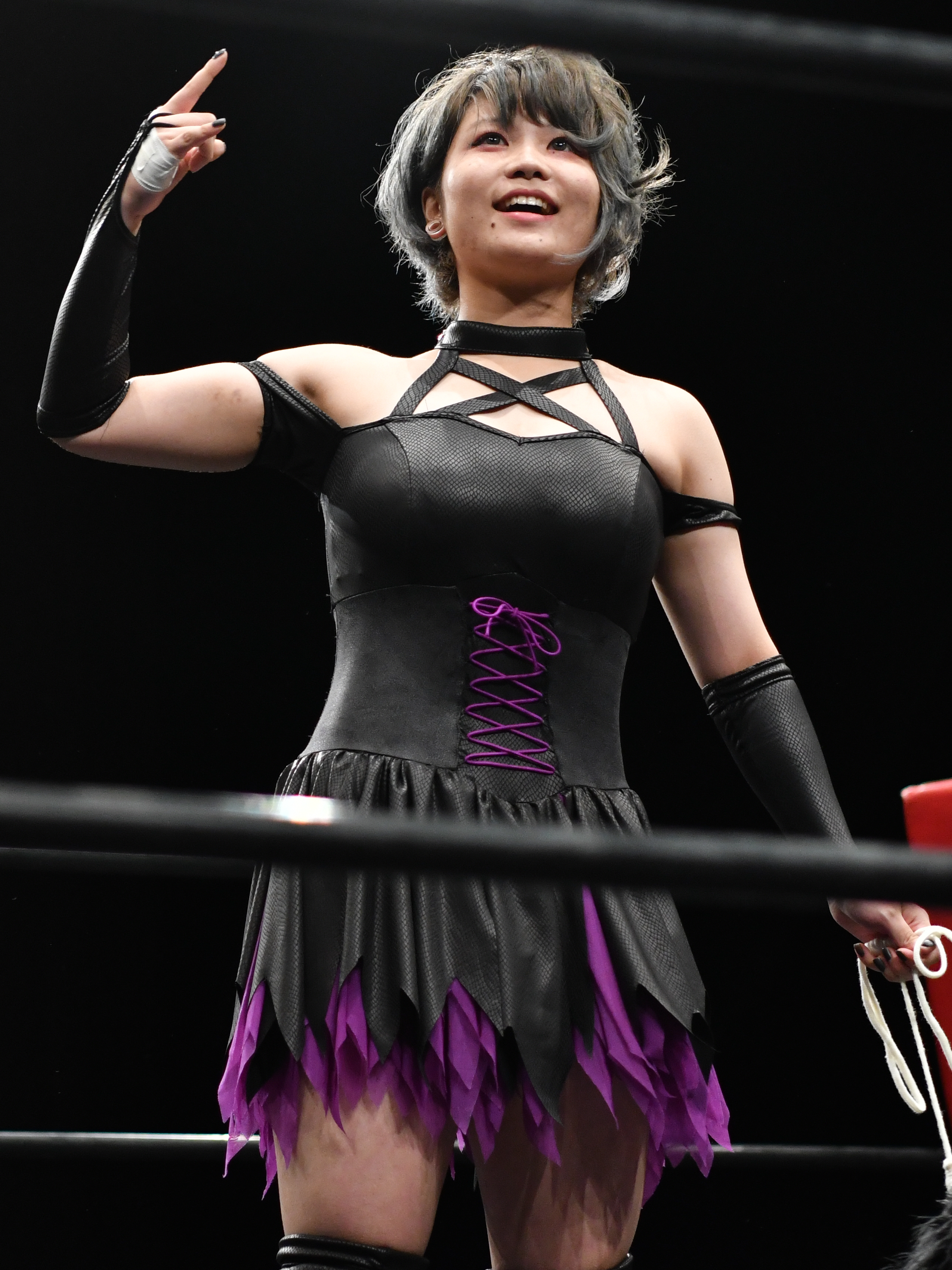
- Kurone in August 2016

Personal information
- Born: December 15 Japan

Professional wrestling career
- Ring name: Maho Kurone
- Billed height: 160 cm (5 ft 3 in)
- Debut: 2016
- Retired: 2018

Maho Kurone (黒音まほ, Kurone Maho) is a retired Japanese professional wrestler best known for her time in the Japanese promotion Tokyo Joshi Pro-Wrestling.

== Professional wrestling career ==
=== Tokyo Joshi Pro-Wrestling (2016–2018) ===
Kurone made her professional wrestling debut in Tokyo Joshi Pro-Wrestling at TJPW Nerima Love Rin on June 15, 2016, where she wrestled Hinako in a 15-minute time limit draw as a result of a dark exhibition match. During her time in the promotion, she chased after various championships promoted by it. She teamed up with her long time "Dragon Bombers" tag team partner Rika Tatsumi and participated in the inaugural tournament of the Princess Tag Team Championship, in which they defeated Brave☆Mates (Yuu and Nodoka-Oneesan) in the first rounds from September 9, 2017, Trick Student (Yuna Manase and Marika Kobashi) in the second rounds from September 16, but fell short to MiraClians (Yuka Sakazaki and Shoko Nakajima) on the finals from October 14 at Smile Yes Yokohama. At TJPW Let's Go! Go! on March 10, 2018, Kurone unsuccessfully challenged Miyu Yamashita for the Princess of Princess Championship. The last match of her career took place at TJPW Let's Go To Itabashi on May 5, 2018, where she fell short to Su Yung.

=== DDT Pro-Wrestling (2016–2018) ===
Due to being a TJPW wrestler, Kurone is known for competing in sister promotion DDT Pro-Wrestling. She made appearances in several of the promotion's signature events such as the DDT Peter Pan. At Ryōgoku Peter Pan 2017 from August 20, she participated in a Rumble rules match for the Ironman Heavymetalweight Championship won by Yuu and also involving Mizuki, Cherry, Nonoko, Shoko Nakajima, Tetsuya Koda, Azusa Takigawa and others. Another branch of events in which she has worked was the DDT Judgement. At Judgement 2018: DDT 21st Anniversary on March 25, she teamed up with Rika Tatsumi in a losing effort against MiraClians (Yuka Sakazaki and Shoko Nakajima). She once held the Ironman Heavymetalweight Championship after she defeated Joey Ryan at DDT Yokohama Twilight 2017 from July 15.

=== Retirement ===
On 30 July 2018, TJPW announced that, following a diagnosis of Generalized anxiety disorder, Kurone had chosen to take a leave of indefinite absence from professional wrestling.

== Championships and accomplishments ==
- DDT Pro-Wrestling
  - Ironman Heavymetalweight Championship (1 time)
