= Haru Kazashiro =

Japanese wrestler (born 2008)

- Kazashiro in May 2026

Personal information
- Born: 28 March 2008 (age 18) Tokyo, Japan

Professional wrestling career
- Ring name: Trainee Haru Haru Kazashiro
- Billed height: 158 cm (5 ft 2 in)
- Debut: 2023

Haru Kazashiro (Japanese: 風城 ハル, Hepburn: Kazashiro Haru; born 28 March 2008) is a Japanese professional wrestler signed to Tokyo Joshi Pro-Wrestling (TJPW) where she is one half of the current Princess Tag Team Champions in her first reign.

== Professional wrestling career ==
=== Tokyo Joshi Pro-Wrestling (2023–present) ===
Kazashiro made her professional wrestling debut in Tokyo Joshi Pro-Wrestling at TJPW Grand Princess '23 on March 18, where she teamed up with Kaya Toribami, Runa Okubo and Toga who were also rookies at the time in a losing effort against Himawari, Mahiro Kiryu, Shino Suzuki and Wakana Uehara. She chased for various championships during her time with the promotion. At Yoshiko Hasegawa Graduation - NonfictioN on July 8, 2025, Kazashiro competed in a 27-on-1 handicap match also disputed for the Ironman Heavymetalweight Championship, in which Yoshiko Hasegawa fought the entire TJPW roster, including Kazashiro herself. At TJPW Yes! Wonderland '26 on May 4, 2026, Kazashiro unsuccessfully challenged Suzume for the International Princess Championship.

She competed in various of the promotion's signature events. In the Tokyo Princess Cup, she made her debut at the 2024 edition where she fell short to Ryo Mizunami in the first rounds. In the Futari Wa Princess Max Heart Tournament, she made her first appearance at the 2025 edition where she teamed up with Toga and defeated Ivy Steele and Kira Summer in the first rounds, only to fall short to Himawari and Shino Suzuki in the second.

In the Wrestle Princess series of events, Kazashiro made her debut at the 2023 edition where she fell short to Runa Okubo in singles competition. One year later at Wrestle Princess V, Kazashiro took revenge on Okubo, this time scoring a victory against the latter. At Wrestle Princess VII, Kazashiro teamed up with Yuki Aino as "Shunrai Rekka Prism Greed" and defeated Hakuchumu (Miu Watanabe and Rika Tatsumi) to win the Princess Tag Team Championship. Kazashiro became the youngest-ever wrestler to hold a title in TJPW at the time of the match.

=== DDT Pro-Wrestling (2026–present) ===
As a developmental talent, Kazashiro often competes in events promoted by TJPW's sister-promotion DDT Pro-Wrestling. At Judgement 2026 on March 22, she teamed up with Himawari and Chika Nanase to defeat Toga, Ren Konatsu, and Shion Kanzaki.

== Professional wrestling style and persona ==
Kazashiro grew up influenced by her parents who are also professional wrestling fans. During junior high school, she played the euphonium in the brass band. At a fan event in June 2024, she showcased her skills as a member of Tokyo Joshi Paradise Orchestra, a band composed of wrestlers from Tokyo Joshi Pro-Wrestling. She is a fan of Tokusatsu superhero shows, and his entrance poses include the "Space is here!" pose from Kamen Rider Fourze, and the "Now, count your sins" pose from Kamen Rider W. Her ring name, Kazashiro, comes from Kazashiro Miu, a character in Kamen Rider Fourze. Initially, there was also a proposal to use " Narumi", a character in Kamen Rider W.

== Championships and accomplishments ==
- Tokyo Joshi Pro-Wrestling
  - Princess Tag Team Championship (1 time, current)
