= Wrestle Princess IV =

2023 Tokyo Joshi Pro-Wrestling event

- Promotional poster featuring most of the participants
- Promotion: CyberFight
- Brand: Tokyo Joshi Pro-Wrestling
- Date: October 9, 2023
- City: Tokyo, Japan
- Venue: Tama Mirai Messe
- Attendance: 868

Pay-per-view chronology
← Previous; Summer Sun Princess	Next → All Rise

Wrestle Princess chronology
← Previous; III	Next → V

Wrestle Princess IV was a professional wrestling event promoted by CyberFight's sub-brand Tokyo Joshi Pro-Wrestling (TJPW). It was the fourth annual Wrestle Princess and took place on October 9, 2023, in Tokyo, Japan, at the Tama Mirai Messe. The event aired on CyberAgent's AbemaTV online linear television service and CyberFight's streaming service Wrestle Universe.

== Background ==
=== Storylines ===
The event featured ten professional wrestling matches that resulted from scripted storylines, where wrestlers portrayed villains, heroes, or less distinguishable characters in the scripted events that built tension and culminated in a wrestling match or series of matches.

=== Event ===
The event started with two preshow matches broadcast live on TJPW's YouTube channel. In the first one, Runa Okubo defeated Haru Kazashiro in singles competition, and in the second one, Arisu Endo, Himawari and Kaya Toribami defeated Harukaze, Riara and Yoshiko Hasegawa in six-way tag team action.

In the first main card bout, Moka Miyamoto defeated Juria Nagano. Next up, Aja Kong, Raku and Shino Suzuki picked up a victory over Hyper Misao, Toga and Wakana Uehara . In the fifth match, Miu Watanabe and Yuki Arai defeated Ryo Mizunami and Yuki Aino in tag team action. In the sixth match, Martha, Mei Saint-Michel, Sakisama and Yukio Saint Laurent defeated DDT Pro-Wrestling's representative Antonio Honda and Pom Harajuku, Shoko Nakajima and Suzume. The bout symbolized the end of the Neo Biishiki-gun stable, as well as Sakisama's last TJPW appearance before her retirement match which was scheduled to take place at Ultimate Party 2023 later that year. Next up, All Elite Wrestling's Nyla Rose picked up a win over Maki Itoh in singles competition. In the eighth bout, Hikari Noa and Nao Kakuta defeated Mahiro Kiryu and Yuki Kamifuku to win the vacant Princess Tag Team Championship, titles relinquished three months prior to the event due to Yuka Sakazaki suffering an injury. In the semi main event, Max the Impaler defeated Rika Tatsumi to win latter's International Princess Championship in a winner takes all bout which was also disputed for Max's NWA World Women's Television Championship.

In the main event, Miyu Yamashita defeated Mizuki to win the Princess of Princess Championship, ending the latter's reign at 205 days and three successful defenses.

== Results ==
No.	Results	Stipulations	Times
1^{P}	Runa Okubo defeated Haru Kazashiro	Singles match	5:16
2^{P}	Arisu Endo, Himawari and Kaya Toribami defeated Harukaze, Riara and Yoshiko Hasegawa	Six-woman tag team match	12:07
3	Moka Miyamoto defeated Juria Nagano	Singles match	6:28
4	Aja Kong, Raku and Shino Suzuki defeated Hyper Misao, Toga and Wakana Uehara	Six-woman tag team match	11:04
5	Miu Watanabe and Yuki Arai defeated Ryo Mizunami and Yuki Aino	Tag team match	13:10
6	Neo Biishiki-gun (Martha, Mei Saint-Michel, Sakisama and Yukio Saint Laurent) defeated Antonio Honda, Pom Harajuku, Shoko Nakajima and Suzume	Eight-person tag team match	14:45
7	Nyla Rose defeated Maki Itoh	Singles match	12:20
8	Free WiFi (Hikari Noa and Nao Kakuta) defeated Toyo Mates (Mahiro Kiryu and Yuki Kamifuku)	Tag team match for the vacant Princess Tag Team Championship	13:37
9	Max the Impaler (NWA) defeated Rika Tatsumi (International)	Winner Takes All match for both the NWA World Women's Television Championship and International Princess Championship	15:19
10	Miyu Yamashita defeated Mizuki (c)	Singles match for the Princess of Princess Championship	21:24
(c) / – the champion(s) heading into the match; P / – the match was broadcast on the pre-show
