= Pom Harajuku =

Japanese professional wrestler

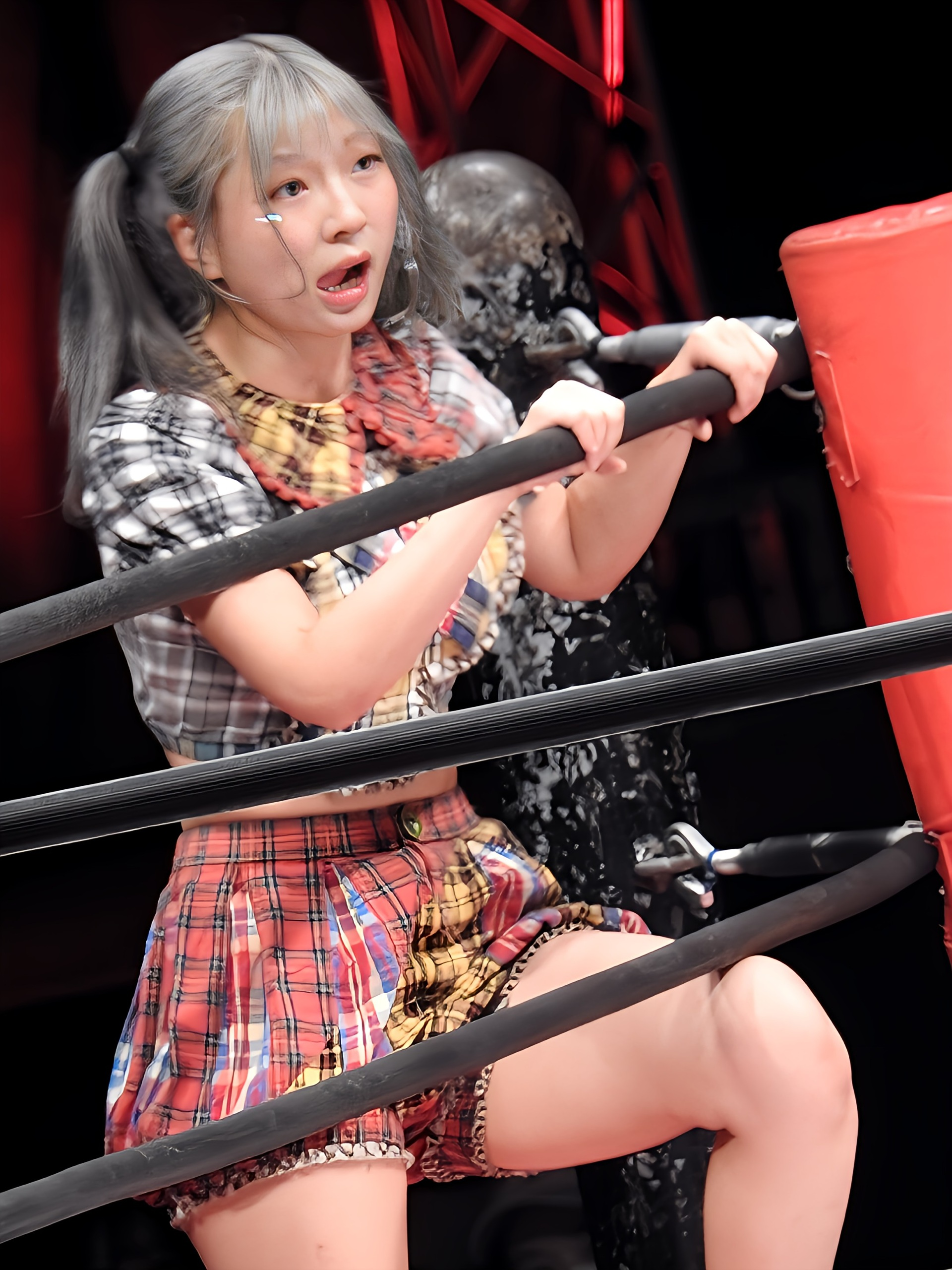
- Harajuku in September 2024

Personal information
- Born: 27 March 1996 (age 30) Tokyo, Japan

Professional wrestling career
- Ring name: Pom Harajuku
- Billed height: 163 cm (5 ft 4 in)
- Debut: 2018

Pom Harajuku (原宿ぽむ, Harajuku Pomu) (born March 27, 1996) is a Japanese professional wrestler signed to Tokyo Joshi Pro-Wrestling (TJPW). She is also known for her work in the Japanese independent scene.

== Early life ==
Harajuku has a swimming background, although not achieving any major performances or doing it full-time. She first attended a professional wrestling event at the Thailand Japan Expo in 2017, where she saw Daimaou Kosaka performing on one of the Michinoku Pro Wrestling shows, moment in which she was captivated by the action and decided to become a professional wrestler herself.

== Professional wrestling career ==
=== Tokyo Joshi Pro-Wrestling (2018–present) ===
Harajuku made her professional wrestling debut in Tokyo Joshi Pro-Wrestling at TJPW How Do You Like Narimasu? on November 24, 2018, where she fell short to Yuka Sakazaki in singles competition. During her time in TJPW, Harajuku challenged for the promotion's titles. In 2020, she took part in a tournament disputed for the vacant International Princess Championship in which she fell short to Hikari Noa in the first rounds. At TJPW All Rise '22 on November 27, 2022, Harajuku teamed up with Yuki Aino to unsuccessfully challenge Reiwa AA Cannon (Saki Akai and Yuki Arai) for the Princess Tag Team Championship.

During her time in the promotion, she competed in various signature events. In the Tokyo Princess Cup, she made her first appearance at the 2020 edition where she fell short to Natsumi Maki in the second rounds. In the 2021 edition of the event, she fell short to Mirai Maiumi in the first rounds. In the 2022 edition, Harajuku defeated Moka Miyamoto in the first rounds, then fell short to Suzume in the second ones. In the 2024 edition, she fell short to Yuki Kamifuku in the first rounds.

At the Wrestle Princess pay-per-view, TJPW's main annual event, Harajuku made her first appearance at Wrestle Princess I on November 7, 2020, where she teamed up with Mahiro Kiryu to defeat Haruna Neko and Marika Kobashi. At Wrestle Princess II on October 9, 2021, she teamed up with Raku and Ram Kaicho to defeat Haruna Neko, Kaya Toribami and Mahiro Kiryu. At Wrestle Princess III on October 9, 2022, she teamed up with Aja Kong and Raku in a losing effort against Max the Impaler, Rika Tatsumi and Yuki Aino. At Wrestle Princess IV on October 9, 2023, Harajuku teamed up with Antonio Honda, Shoko Nakajima and Suzume in a losing effort against Neo Biishiki-gun (Martha, Mei Saint-Michel, Sakisama and Yukio Saint Laurent). At Wrestle Princess V on September 22, 2024, Harajuku teamed up with Aja Kong and Max the Impaler to defeat Rika Tatsumi, Yuki Aino and Shino Suzuki.

==== Japanese independent scene (2021–present) ====
Due to TJPW being a CyberFight underbrand, Harajuku often competed in cross-over events held by its satellite promotions as a joshi talent. At CyberFight Festival 2021, an event promoted by TJPW, DDT and Noah on June 6, 2021, Harajuku teamed up with Nao Kakuta, Raku, Mahiro Kiryu and Kaya Toribami in a losing effort against BeeStar (Mirai Maiumi and Suzume), Haruna Neko, Moka Miyamoto and Arisu Endo. One year later at CyberFight Festival 2022, she teamed up with Hyper Misao, Yuki Aino, Yuuri and Haruna Neko in a losing effort against Nao Kakuta, Mahiro Kiryu, Moka Miyamoto, Arisu Endo and Kaya Toribami.

At Ultimate Party 2023, an event promoted by DDT Pro-Wrestling, Harajuku teamed up with Raku, Haruna Neko and Mirai Maiumi in a losing effort against Hikari Noa, Yumi, Mahiro Kiryu and Suzume.

== Championships and accomplishments ==
- DDT Pro-Wrestling
  - Ironman Heavymetalweight Championship (4 times)
- Tokyo Joshi Pro-Wrestling
  - Shinagawa Three Woman Festival (2024) – with Yuki Aino and Raku
- Setup Thailand Pro-Wrestling
  - Setup All Asia Women's Championship (1 time)
