= Wakana Uehara =

Japanese professional wrestler

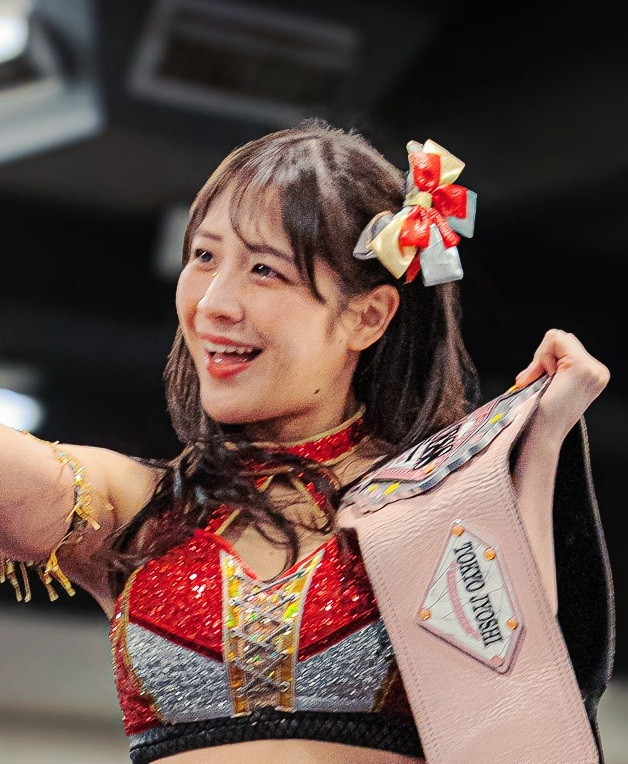
- Uehara in March 2026

Personal information
- Born: 13 May 1996 (age 30) Kanagawa, Japan

Professional wrestling career
- Ring name: Wakana Uehara
- Billed height: 163 cm (5 ft 4 in)
- Trained by: Aja Kong; Tokyo Joshi Pro-Wrestling
- Debut: 2022

Wakana Uehara (上原 わかな, Uehara Wakana) is a Japanese professional wrestler, former idol and tarento signed to Tokyo Joshi Pro-Wrestling (TJPW),

== Early life ==
Prior to her professional wrestling career, Uehara worked in the entertainment industry. In 2013, Uehara participated in CanCam's New Generation Model Audition and was selected as one of the 100 semi-finalists out of 21,608 applicants. In 2014, while attending a movie audition, she was scouted by a film staff member from One Eight Promotion Ltd. and began her entertainment career.

On June 2, 2018, Uehara made her idol debut as the center of the girl group "99999" (Quintex) at the Grand Prix Final of "OTONOVA2018" held at Ex Theatre Roppongi. On November 14, at the Mudia2019 Ambassador Championship Finals ( held at Zepp DiverCity Tokyo), Uehara's idol unit 99999 alongside TOYZ, who were produced through the 2017 Super Idol Audition (SIA) merged and made their major debut as the Advance Arc Harmony group.

== Professional wrestling career ==
=== Tokyo Joshi Pro-Wrestling (2022–present) ===
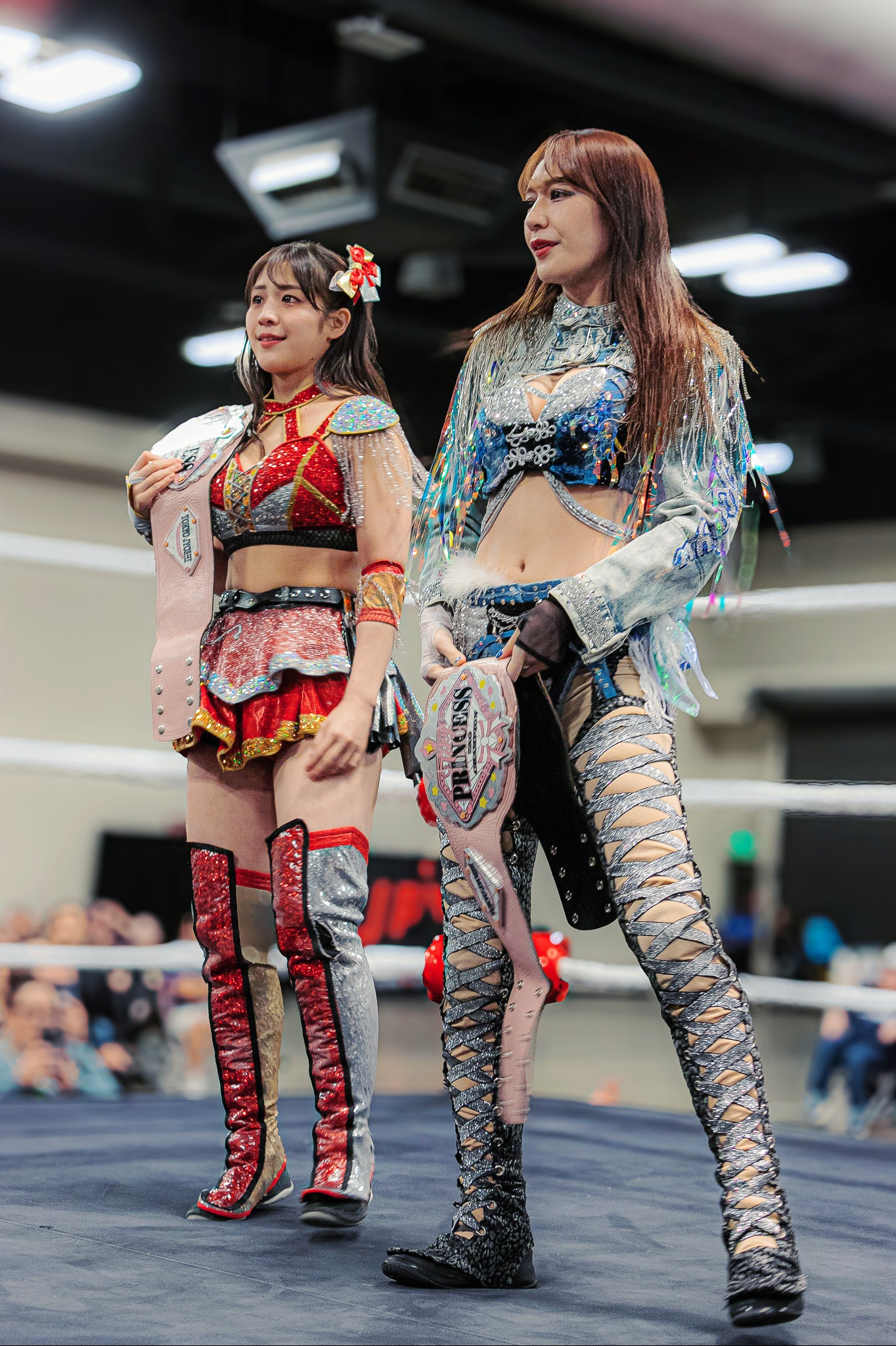
Uehara (left) as one half of the Princess Tag Team Champions alongside Yuki Kamifuku as "Ober Eats".

Uehara made her professional wrestling debut in Tokyo Joshi Pro-Wrestling at TJPW Yume Pro Wrestling - Dream On The Ring on October 14, 2022, where she fell short to Shoko Nakajima in singles competition. During her tenure with the promotion, she chased for various titles. At TJPW Live In Las Vegas on April 18, 2025, she teamed up with "Ober Eats" tag team partner Yuki Kamifuku to unsuccessfully challenge Kyoraku Kyomei (Hyper Misao and Shoko Nakajima) for the Princess Tag Team Championship. At TJPW Yoshiko Hasegawa Graduation - NonfictioN on July 8, 2025, Uehara competed in a Best two out of three falls 27-on-1 handicap match, which represented Yoshiko Hasegawa's retirement match. The bout was also disputed for Hasegawa's Ironman Heavymetalweight Championship and also involved notable opponents from the time's roster such as Miu Watanabe, Mizuki, Rika Tatsumi and Yuki Aino.

Uehara competed in various of the promotion's signature events. In the "Wrestle Princess" series, she made her first appearance at the fourth event from October 9, 2023, where she teamed up with Hyper Misao and Toga in a losing effort against Aja Kong, Raku and Shino Suzuki. At Wrestle Princess V on September 22, 2024, she teamed up with Toga in a losing effort against Sho Sekiguchi and Mahiro Kiryu.

In the Tokyo Princess Cup, Uehara made her first appearance at the 2024 edition where she fell short to Yuki Arai in the second rounds.

=== Independent circuit (2023–present) ===
Uehara often competes in promotions from various independent scenes as developmental talent sent by TJPW. At Ultimate Party 2023, an event promoted by DDT Pro-Wrestling, she teamed up with Daisy Monkey (Suzume and Arisu Endo) in a losing effort against Yuki Arai, Moka Miyamoto and Shino Suzuki. At Summer of the Beasts, an event promoted by Major League Wrestling on June 26, 2025, Uehara fell short to tag partner Yuki Kamifuku in singles competition.

== Championships and accomplishments ==
- Pro Wrestling Illustrated
  - Ranked No. 195 of the top 250 female wrestlers in the PWI Women's 250 in 2025
- Tokyo Joshi Pro Wrestling
  - Tokyo Princess Tag Team Championship (1 time) – with Yuki Kamifuku
