= Azusa Takigawa =

Japanese professional wrestler

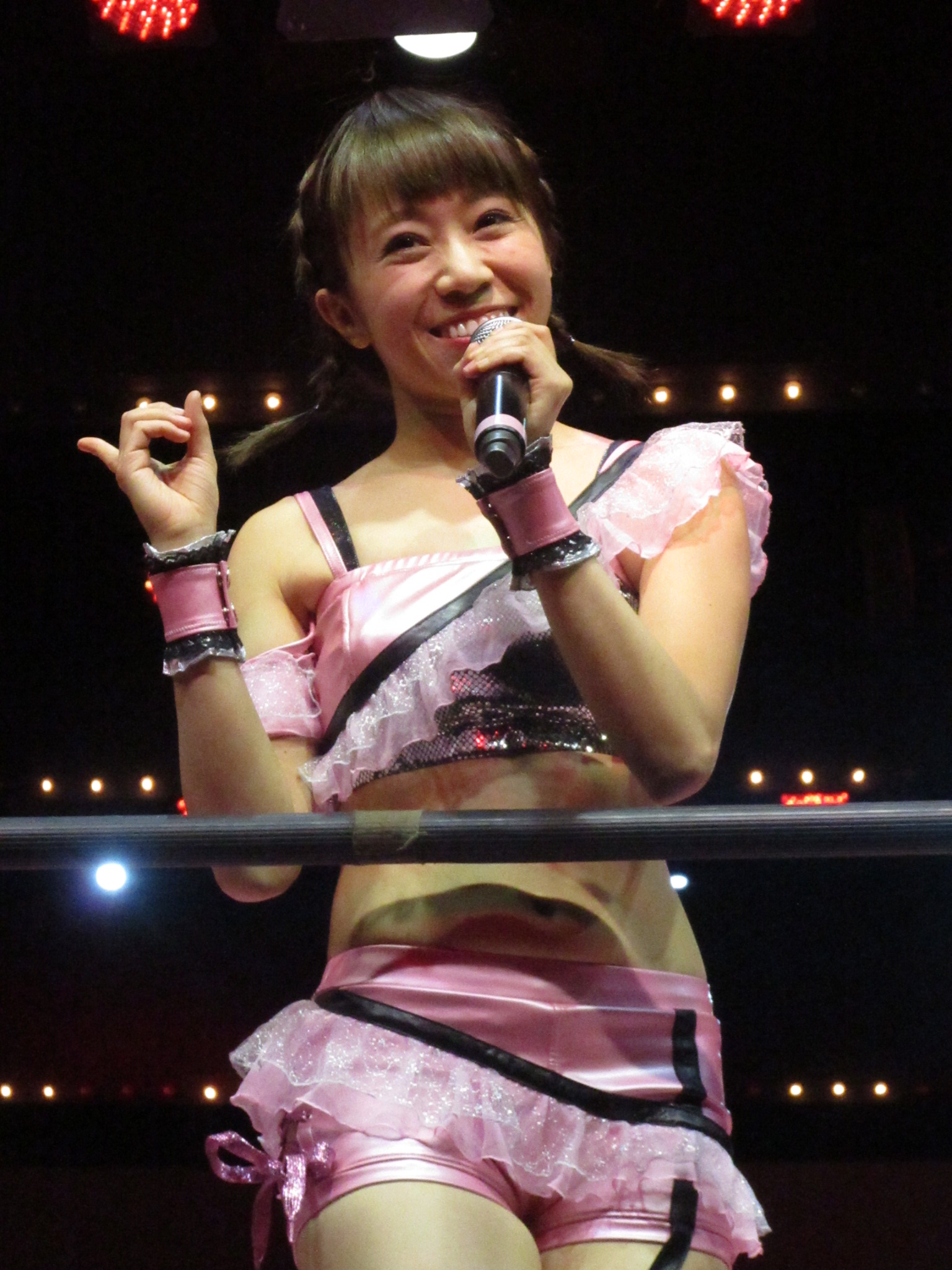
- Takigawa in October 2018

Personal information
- Born: July 18, 1987 (age 39) Tokyo, Japan

Professional wrestling career
- Ring name(s): Azusa Christie; Azusa Takigawa
- Billed height: 161 cm (5 ft 3 in)
- Billed weight: 47 kg (104 lb)
- Debut: 2015
- Retired: 2018

Azusa Takigawa (滝川あずさ, Takigawa Azusa) is a retired Japanese professional wrestler best known for her time with the Japanese promotion Tokyo Joshi Pro-Wrestling where she is a former Princess Tag Team Champion.

== Professional wrestling career ==
=== Tokyo Joshi Pro-Wrestling (2015–2018) ===
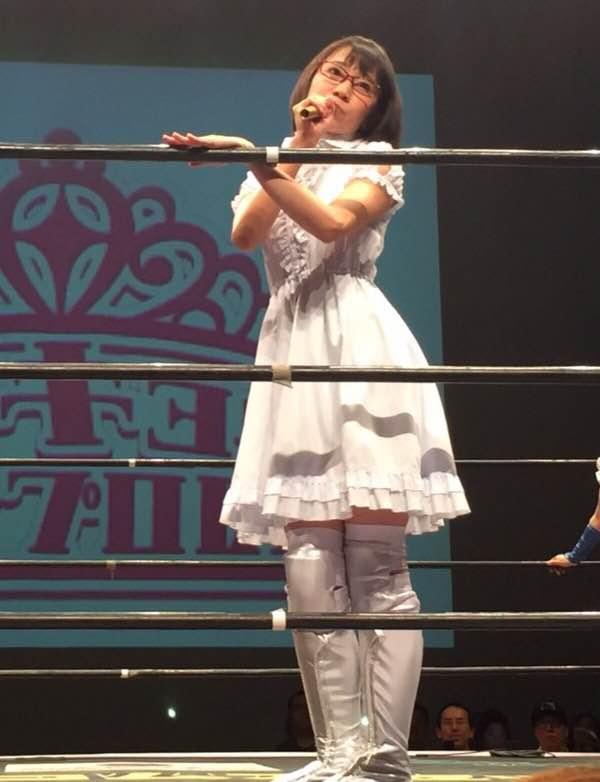
Takigawa on the day of her debut in September 2015.

Takigawa made her professional wrestling debut in Tokyo Joshi Pro-Wrestling at TJPW You Grow Up on September 22, 2015, where she fell short to Miyu Yamashita in a Singles match. During her time in the promotion, she was part of the Neo Biishiki-gun stable and chased after various championships promoted by it. She won the Princess Tag Team Championship alongside Sakisama at Let's Go! Go! If You Go! When You Go! If You Get Lost You Just Go to Nerima! on May 3, 2018 by defeating MiraClians (Shoko Nakajima and Yuka Sakazaki). At TJPW At This Time, Get Excited In Narimasu! on April 8, 2017, she unsuccessfully challenged Yuu for the Princess of Princess Championship. Takigawa wrestled her last match at TJPW 5th Anniversary Shin-Kiba Tour 2018 Autumn One on October 27, 2018, where she faced the likes of Hikari Noa, Hyper Misao, Maki Itoh, Tetsuya Koda, Reika Saiki, Yuki Kamifuku, Yuna Manase and others in a best three-out-of-five falls 18-on-one handicap match.

=== DDT Pro-Wrestling (2016–2018) ===
Due to being a TJPW wrestler, Takigawa is known for competing in sister-promotion DDT Pro-Wrestling. She made appearances in several of the promotion's signature events such as the DDT Judgement, marking her first performance at Judgement 2016: DDT 19th Anniversary on March 21 where she participated in a 13-woman battle royal won by Yuka Sakazaki and also involving Ai Shimizu, Marika Kobashi, Nodoka Tenma and others. At Judgement 2017: DDT 20th Anniversary on March 20, she teamed up with Reika Saiki and Rika Tatsumi in a losing effort against Yuu, Mil Clown and Maki Itoh. Another branch of events in which Misao has worked is DDT Peter Pan, making her first appearance at Ryōgoku Peter Pan 2017 on August 20, where she competed in a Rumble rules match for the Ironman Heavymetalweight Championship won by Yuu and also involving Yuna Manase, Mizuki, Maho Kurone and others. She has also made appearances in non-flagship events such as the DDT/Saki Akai Produce DDT Collection from March 14, 2018, where she competed in a GM for a day match won by Kazuki Hirata and also involving notable male opponents of the roster such as Akito, Antonio Honda, Danshoku Dino, Harashima, Konosuke Takeshita, Yuki Ueno, Yuko Miyamoto and female, such as Yoshiko.

== Championships and accomplishments ==
- Tokyo Joshi Pro Wrestling
  - Tokyo Princess Tag Team Championship (1 time) – with Sakisama
