= Nao Kakuta =

Japanese professional wrestler

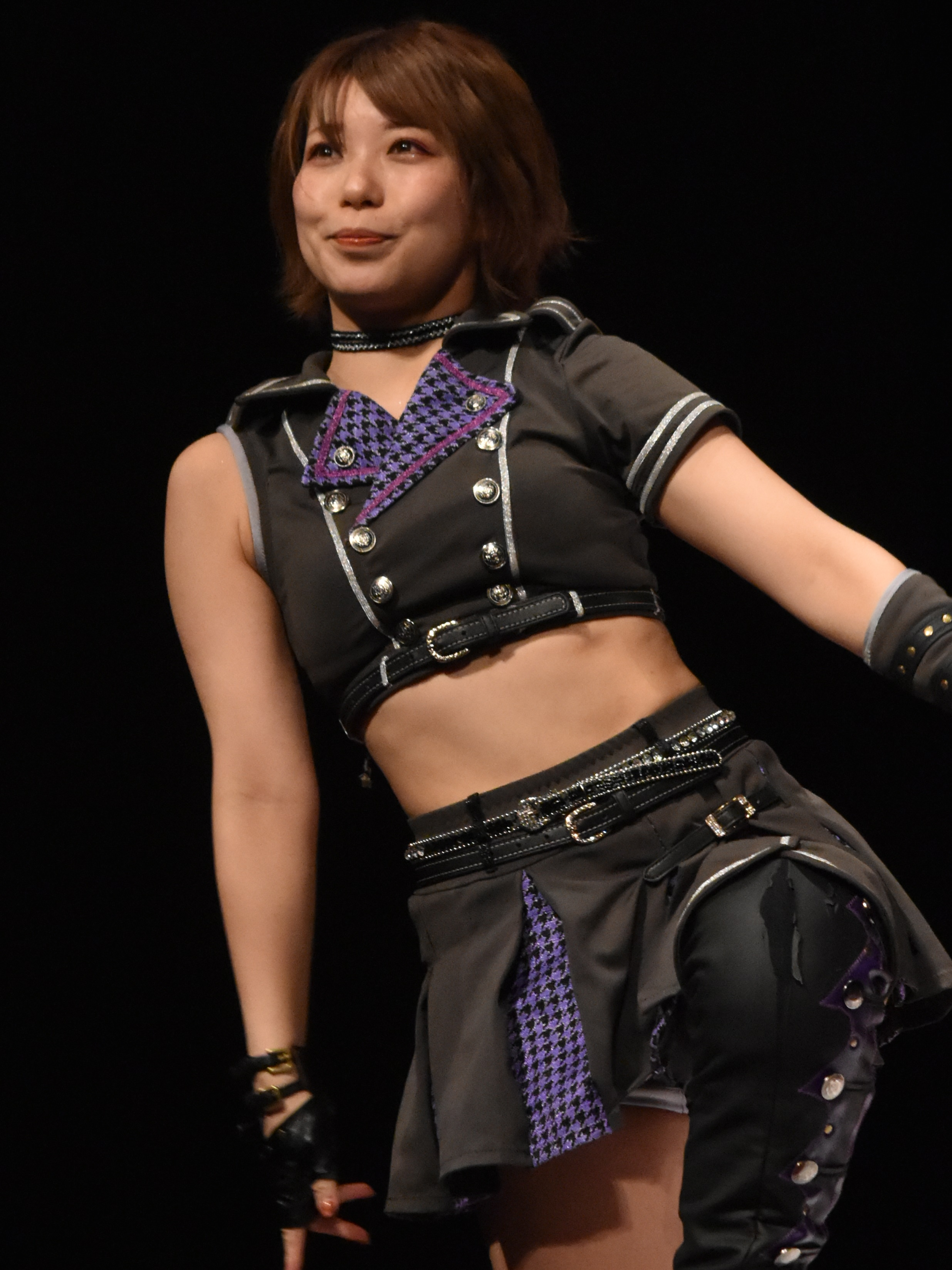
- Kakuta in May 2023

Personal information
- Born: March 20, 1987 (age 39) Chiba, Japan

Professional wrestling career
- Ring name: Nao Kakuta
- Billed height: 1.61 m (5 ft 3 1/2 in)
- Trained by: Yuna Manase
- Debut: 2015
- Retired: 2024

Nao Kakuta (角田 奈穂, Kakuta Nao) is a Japanese retired professional wrestler, known for her time with Tokyo Joshi Pro-Wrestling (TJPW) where she a former Princess Tag Team Champions alongside Hikari Noa and her tenure with Actwres girl'Z.

== Professional wrestling career ==
=== Actwres girl'Z (2015–2020) ===
Kakuta made her professional wrestling debut in Actwres girl'Z at AgZ Prologue, the first-ever show hosted by the promotion on May 31, 2015, where she fell short to Tae Honma in singles competition. She chased for various accomplishments put up for grabs by the promotion. She participated in the inaugural tournament of the AWG Single Championship, where she fell short to Kakeru Sekiguchi in the first rounds from September 25, 2018.

=== Independent circuit (2016–2024) ===
Kakuta has competed for a multitude of promotions on the Japanese independent scene. She made her first appearance in Wrestle-1 on the third night of the W-1 WRESTLE-1 Tour 2017 Outbreak from June 11, where she teamed up with Hoshitango in a losing effort against Noa Igarashi and Ryuichi Sekine as a result of a mixed tag team match. At Ice Ribbon New Ice Ribbon #1008 on November 23, 2019, Kakuta teamed up with Yappy in a losing effort against Ram Kaicho and Maika Ozaki. At a house show of Professional Wrestling Just Tap Out from December 18, 2019, she teamed up with Tomoka Inaba in a losing effort against Maika and Tae Honma. At DDT Ganbare Pro Sangeria 2022, an event promoted by Ganbare Pro-Wrestling on August 21, 2022, she teamed up with Yoshiko Hasegawa in a losing effort against Moeka Haruhi and Yuna Manase.

Kakuta made an appearance in the American independent scene at WrestleCon Mark Hitchcock Memorial SuperShow 2023 on March 30, where she competed as a TJPW talent alongside Hikari Noa, Hakuchumu (Miu Watanabe and Rika Tatsumi) and Raku, in a losing effort against Hyper Misao, Mizuki, Shoko Nakajima, Yuki Aino and Yuki Kamifuku.

=== Tokyo Joshi Pro-Wrestling (2020–2024) ===
Kakuta made her debut in Tokyo Joshi Pro-Wrestling at TJPW Style Of My Love on November 20, 2020, where she teamed up with Mirai Maiumi, Miu Watanabe and Mizuki in a losing effort against Hikari Noa, Mahiro Kiryu, Pom Harajuku and Yuki Kamifuku as a result of an eight-woman tag team match. During her time in the promotion, she has chased for various titles. At TJPW Still Incomplete on April 17, 2021, she unsuccessfully challenged Yuki Kamifuku for the International Princess Championship. At TJPW Stand Alone '23 on April 15, 2023, she unsuccessfully challenged Mizuki for the Princess of Princess Championship.

She competed in various of the promotion's signature events. In the Wrestle Princess series, she made her first appearance at the 2021 edition where she teamed up with Marika Kobashi in a losing effort against Asuka and Yuki Kamifuku. At Wrestle Princess III on October 9, 2022, she teamed up with Yoshiko Hasegawa and Yuna Manase to defeat Haruna Neko and Toyo Mates (Mahiro Kiryu and Yuki Kamifuku). At Wrestle Princess IV on October 9, 2023, she teamed up with her "Free Wifi" tag team partner Hikari Noa to defeat Toyo Mates (Mahiro Kiryu and Yuki Kamifuku) for the vacant Princess Tag Team Championship.

As for the Tokyo Princess Cup, Kakuta made her first appearance at the eighth edition of the tournament from 2021, where she fell short to Miyu Yamashita in the first rounds on July 22.

=== Pro Wrestling Noah (2021–2022) ===
Due to TJPW sharing business partnerships with CyberFight sister-promotion Pro Wrestling Noah, Kakuta competed in two of the CyberFight Festival cross-over events promoted by both of the brands. She made her first appearance at the 2021 edition where she teamed up with Raku, Pom Harajuku, Mahiro Kiryu and Kaya Toribami in a losing effort against BeeStar (Mirai Maiumi and Suzume), Haruna Neko, Moka Miyamoto and Arisu Endo as a result of a ten-woman tag team match. At the 2022 edition, she teamed up with Mahiro Kiryu, Moka Miyamoto, Arisu Endo and Kaya Toribami to defeat Hyper Misao, Yuki Aino, Yuuri, Pom Harajuku and Haruna Neko.

== Championships and accomplishments ==
- Pro Wrestling Illustrated
  - Ranked No. 88 of the top 100 tag teams in the PWI Tag Team 100 of 2023 with Hikari Noa
- Tokyo Joshi Pro-Wrestling
  - Princess Tag Team Championship (1 time) – with Hikari Noa
