= Moka Miyamoto =

Japanese professional wrestler (born 1999)

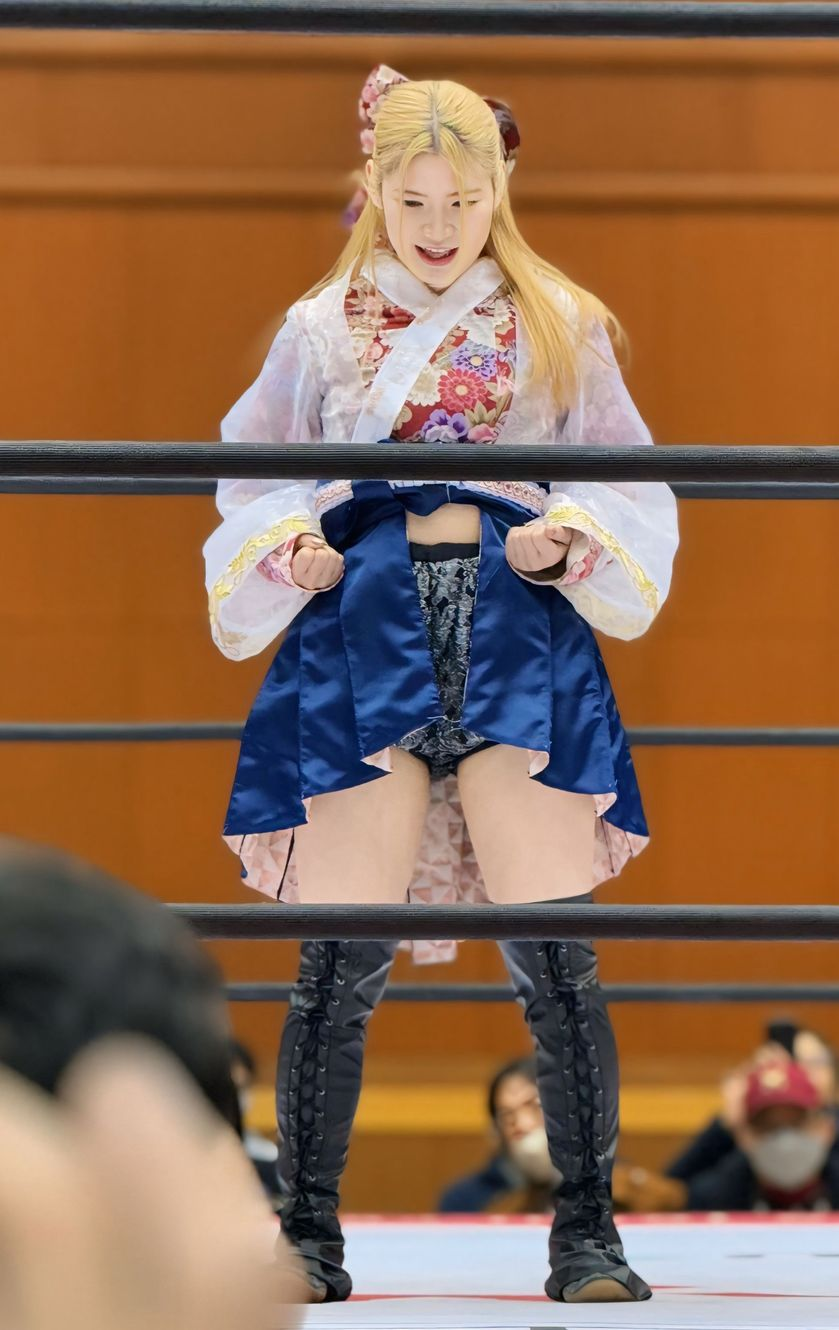
- Miyamoto in January 2025

Personal information
- Born: March 18, 1999 (age 27) Kanagawa, Japan

Professional wrestling career
- Ring name: Aona Moka Miyamoto
- Billed height: 160 cm (5 ft 3 in)
- Debut: 2020
- Retired: December 10, 2025

Moka Miyamoto (宮本もか, Miyamoto Moka) (born March 19, 1999) is a Japanese retired professional wrestler and former karateka who wrestled in Tokyo Joshi Pro-Wrestling (TJPW). She was a one-time International Princess Champion. She was also known for her work in the Japanese independent scene. She retired on December 10, 2025.

== Early life ==
Miyamoto is a former Shotokan karateka, sport in which she has obtained one Dan. In university, her major was Japanese culture. She graduated in March 2021.

== Professional wrestling career ==
=== Tokyo Joshi Pro-Wrestling (2020–2025) ===
Miyamoto made her professional wrestling debut in Tokyo Joshi Pro-Wrestling at TJPW Brand New Wrestling 4 on July 23, 2020, where she teamed up with Suzume in a losing effort against Mirai Maiumi and Sena Shiori in tag team competition. During her time in TJPW, Miyamoto challenged for the promotion's titles. At TJPW All Rise '23 on October 27, 2023, she teamed up with Juria Nagano to unsuccessfully challenge Free WiFi (Hikari Noa and Nao Kakuta) for the Princess Tag Team Championship.

During her time in the promotion, she competed in various signature events. In the Tokyo Princess Cup, she made her first appearance at the 2021 edition where she fell short to Raku in the first rounds. At the 2022 edition of the tournament, she fell short to Pom Harajuku in the first rounds. At the 2023 edition, Miyamoto defeated Hyper Misao in the first rounds then fell short to Miyu Yamashita in the second ones. At the 2024 edition of the event, she fell short to Mizuki in the first rounds.

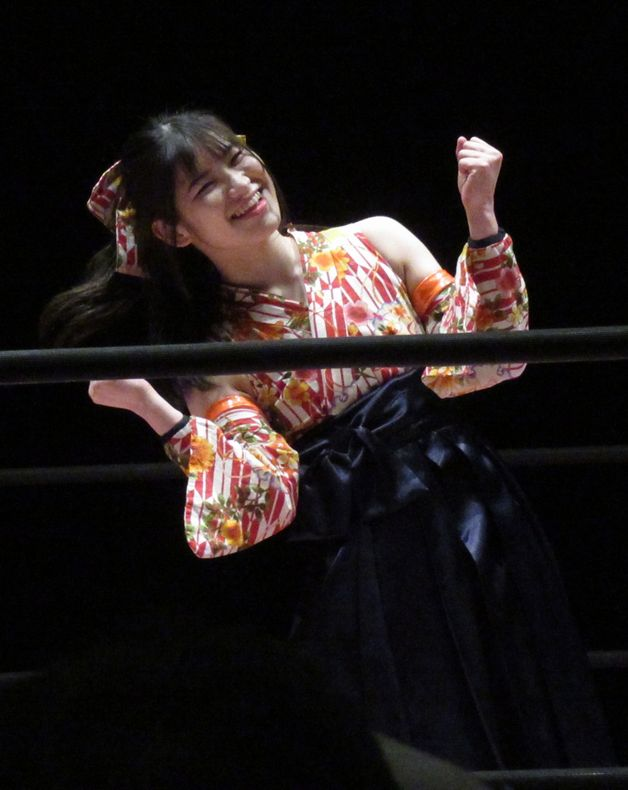
Miyamoto in August 2020

At the Wrestle Princess pay-per-view, TJPW's main annual event, Miyamoto made her first appearance at Wrestle Princess I on November 7, 2020, where she teamed up with Mei Suruga in a losing effort to Suzume and Sena Shiori. At Wrestle Princess II on October 9, 2021, she teamed up with Aja Kong to defeat Miu Watanabe and Yuki Arai. At Wrestle Princess III on October 9, 2022, she teamed up with Juria Nagano to defeat Arisu Endo and Kaya Toribami. At Wrestle Princess IV on October 9, 2023, she defeated Nagano in singles competition. At Wrestle Princess V on September 22, 2024, Miyamoto unsuccessfully challenged Yuki Arai for the International Princess Championship.

At Summer Sun Princess '25 on July 21, 2025, Miyamoto defeated Suzume to win the International Princess Championship, making it the only title in Miyamoto's career, in what would turn out to be her final match. On August 28, Miyamoto was forced to vacate the title due to illness, ending her reign at 38 days. She announced her retirement from professional wrestling on December 10, 2025.

==== Japanese independent scene (2021–2025) ====
Due to TJPW being a CyberFight underbrand, Miyamoto often competed in cross-over events held by its satellite promotions as a joshi talent. At CyberFight Festival 2021, an event promoted by TJPW, DDT and Noah on June 6, 2021, Miyamoto teamed up with Arisu Endo, Haruna Neko and BeeStar (Mirai Maiumi and Suzume) to defeat Kaya Toribami, Mahiro Kiryu, Nao Kakuta, Pom Harajuku and Raku. One year later at CyberFight Festival 2022, she teamed up with Arisu Endo, Kaya Toribami, Mahiro Kiryu and Nao Kakuta to defeat Haruna Neko, Hyper Misao, Pom Harajuku, Yuki Aino and Yuuri.

At Ultimate Party 2023, an event promoted by DDT Pro-Wrestling, Miyamoto teamed up with Yuki Arai and Shino Suzuki to defeat Daisy Monkey (Suzume and Arisu Endo) and Wakana Uehara.

== Professional wrestling style and persona ==
Miyamoto's nickname was the Yamato Nadeshiko Fighter. Her use of traditional Japanese costumes in her ring attire was inspired by her university studies of Japanese culture.

== Championships and accomplishments ==
- Pro Wrestling Illustrated
  - Ranked No. 159 of the top 250 female wrestlers in the PWI Women's 250 in 2025
- Tokyo Joshi Pro Wrestling
  - International Princess Championship (1 time)
