= Princess Tag Team Championship =

Women's professional wrestling championship

- Second and current design of the titles (2026–present)

Details
- Promotion: CyberFight
- Brand: Tokyo Joshi Pro Wrestling
- Date established: August 12, 2017
- Current champions: Shunrai Rekka Prism Greed (Yuki Aino and Haru Kazashiro)
- Date won: May 4, 2026

Other names
- Tokyo Princess Tag Team Championship (2017–2019); Princess Tag Team Championship (2019–present)
Statistics
- First champions: MiraClians (Shoko Nakajima and Yuka Sakazaki)
- Most reigns: As tag team (3 reigns): Magical Sugar Rabbits Mizuki and Yuka Sakazaki); As individual (4 reigns): Sakisama/Saki Akai; Yuka Sakazaki
- Longest reign: Hakuchuumu (Miu Watanabe and Rika Tatsumi) (370 days)
- Shortest reign: 121000000 (Maki Itoh and Miyu Yamashita) (13 days)
- Oldest champion: Jessie McKay (36 years, 279 days)
- Youngest champion: Haru Kazashiro (18 years, 37 days)
- Heaviest champion: Max the Impaler (95 kg (209 lb))

The Princess Tag Team Championship (Japanese: プリンセスタッグ王座, Hepburn: Purinsesu Taggu Ōza) is a women's professional wrestling world tag team championship promoted by the CyberFight promotion, defended on their Tokyo Joshi Pro Wrestling (TJPW) brand. The title was introduced on August 12, 2017. The current champions are Shunrai Rekka Prism Greed (Yuki Aino and Haru Kazashiro), who are in their first reign as a team but third for Aino and first for Kazashiro individually. They won the title by defeating Hakuchuumu (Miu Watanabe and Rika Tatsumi) at Wrestle Princess VII on October 3, 2026.

== History ==
The inaugural champions were crowned on October 14, 2017, when MiraClians (Shoko Nakajima and Yuka Sakazaki) defeated Maho Kurone and Rika Tatsumi in a tournament final. On August 3, 2018, the championship was vacated after the co-champion Marika Kobashi sustained a shoulder injury. Magical Sugar Rabbits (Mizuki and Sakazaki) defeated Maki Itoh and Reika Saiki on August 25 of the same year to win the vacant championship. On July 16, 2019, the title was re-named from Tokyo Princess Tag Team Championship to Princess Tag Team Championship.

On June 9, 2023, the championship was vacated during Magical Sugar Rabbits' third reign, after Sakazaki was diagnosed with a neck injury. On October 9, at Wrestle Princess IV, Free WiFi (Hikari Noa and Nao Kakuta) defeated Toyo Mates (Yuki Kamifuku and Mahiro Kiryu) to win the vacant title. However, on December 31, Noa was sidelined due to health-related issue, thus relinquishing the championship.

On January 4, 2024, at Tokyo Joshi Pro '24, Ryo Mizunami and Yuki Aino won the vacant championship by defeating Daisy Monkey (Arisu Endo and Suzume) and Hakuchumu (Miu Watanabe and Rika Tatsumi) in a three-way tag team match.

=== Inaugural championship tournament ===
Round 1 September 9
Itoh Respect Army (Maki Itoh and Mizuki)	Pin
Muscle Strikers (Reika Saiki and Miyu Yamashita)	12:44
MiraClians (Yuka Sakazaki and Shoko Nakajima)	Pin
Konkatsu-gun (Azusa Takigawa and Nonoko)	12:30
Brave☆Mates (Yuu and Nodoka-oneesan)	11:34
Dragon Bombers (Rika Tatsumi and Maho Kurone)	Pin

Semifinals; September 16
Itoh Respect Army	14:42
MiraClians	Pin
Dragon Bombers	Pin
Trick Student (Yuna Manase and Marika Kobashi)	10:55

Final; October 14
MiraClians	Pin
Dragon Bombers	20:07

== Reigns ==
As of November 11, 2026, there have been a total of 21 reigns shared between 18 different teams composed of 29 individual champions and three vacancies. MiraClians (Shoko Nakajima and Yuka Sakazaki) were the inaugural champions. Magical Sugar Rabbits (Mizuki and Yuka Sakazaki) holds the record for most reigns as a team at three, while individually, Sakazaki tied with Saki Akai (previously known as Sakisama) with most reigns at four. Hakuchuumu (Miu Watanabe and Rika Tatsumi)'s first reign is the longest at 370 days, while 121000000 (Maki Itoh and Miyu Yamashita)'s first reign is the shortest at 13 days.

Shunrai Rekka Prism Greed (Yuki Aino and Haru Kazashiro) are the current champions in their first reign as a team, but third for Aino and first for Kazashiro individually. They won the title by defeating Hakuchuumu (Miu Watanabe and Rika Tatsumi) at Wrestle Princess VII in Tokyo, Japan, on October 3, 2026.

=== Names ===
Name	Years
Tokyo Princess Tag Team Championship	August 12, 2017 – July 16, 2019
Princess Tag Team Championship	July 16, 2019 – present

Key
No.	Overall reign number
Reign	Reign number for the specific team—reign numbers for the individuals are in parentheses, if different
Days	Number of days held
Defenses	Number of successful defenses
+	Current reign is changing daily

No.	Champion	Championship change			Reign statistics			Notes	Ref.
No.	Champion	Date	Event	Location	Reign	Days	Defenses	Notes	Ref.
1	MiraClians (Shoko Nakajima and Yuka Sakazaki)	October 14, 2017	Smile Yes Yokohama	Tokyo, Japan	1	112	2	Nakajima and Sakazaki defeated Maho Kurone and Rika Tatsumi in a tournament final to become the inaugural champions.	
2	Neo Biishiki-gun (Azusa Christie and Sakisama)	February 3, 2018	Let's Go! Go! If You Go! When You Go! If You Get Lost You Just Go to Nerima!	Tokyo, Japan	1	89	2		
3	Muscle JK (Marika Kobashi and Reika Saiki)	May 3, 2018	Yes! Wonderland: Break Myself!	Tokyo, Japan	1	92	1		
—	Vacated	August 3, 2018	—	—	—	—	—	The championship was vacated as Marika Kobashi suffered a shoulder injury.	
4	Magical Sugar Rabbits (Mizuki and Yuka Sakazaki)	August 25, 2018	Brand New Wrestling 2: Now It's Time to Attack	Tokyo, Japan	1 (1, 2)	287	6	Defeated Maki Itoh and Reika Saiki to win the vacant titles.	
5	Neo Biishiki-gun (Misao and Sakisama)	June 8, 2019	Tokyo Princess Cup	Tokyo, Japan	1 (1, 2)	148	3	During this reign, the title was re-named to Princess Tag Team Championship.	
6	Hakuchuumu (Miu Watanabe and Rika Tatsumi)	November 3, 2019	Ultimate Party	Tokyo, Japan	1	370	4	This was a DDT Pro Wrestling event.	
7	Bakuretsu Sisters (Nodoka Tenma and Yuki Aino)	November 7, 2020	Wrestle Princess I	Tokyo, Japan	1	161	2		
8	Neo Biishiki-gun (Mei Saint-Michel and Sakisama)	April 17, 2021	Still Incomplete	Tokyo, Japan	1 (1, 3)	175	2		
9	Magical Sugar Rabbits (Mizuki and Yuka Sakazaki)	October 9, 2021	Wrestle Princess II	Tokyo, Japan	2 (2, 3)	273	5		
10	Reiwa Ban AA Cannon (Saki Akai and Yuki Arai)	July 9, 2022	Summer Sun Princess	Tokyo, Japan	1 (4, 1)	179	3		
11	Wasteland War Party (Heidi Howitzer and Max the Impaler)	January 4, 2023	Tokyo Joshi Pro	Tokyo, Japan	1	73	3		
12	121000000 (Maki Itoh and Miyu Yamashita)	March 18, 2023	Grand Princess	Tokyo, Japan	1	13	0		
13	Magical Sugar Rabbits (Mizuki and Yuka Sakazaki)	March 31, 2023	TJPW Live in Los Angeles	Los Angeles, California	3 (3, 4)	70	1		
—	Vacated	June 9, 2023	—	—	—	—	—	The championship was vacated as Yuka Sakazaki was diagnosed with a neck injury.	
14	Free WiFi (Hikari Noa and Nao Kakuta)	October 9, 2023	Wrestle Princess IV	Tokyo, Japan	1	83	2	Defeated Toyo Mates (Yuki Kamifuku and Mahiro Kiryu) to win the vacant titles.	
—	Vacated	December 31, 2023	—	—	—	—	—	The championship was vacated after Hikari Noa became sick.	
15	Ryo Mizunami and Yuki Aino	January 4, 2024	Tokyo Joshi Pro	Tokyo, Japan	1 (1, 2)	87	0	Defeated Daisy Monkey (Arisu Endo and Suzume) and Hakuchumu (Miu Watanabe and Rika Tatsumi) in a three-way tag team match to win the vacant titles.	
16	Daisy Monkey (Arisu Endo and Suzume)	March 31, 2024	Grand Princess	Tokyo, Japan	1	175	2		
17	121000000 (Maki Itoh and Miyu Yamashita)	September 22, 2024	Wrestle Princess V	Chiba, Japan	2	175	4		
18	Kyoraku Kyomei (Hyper Misao and Shoko Nakajima)	March 16, 2025	Grand Princess	Tokyo, Japan	1 (2, 2)	188	3		
19	Ober Eats (Yuki Kamifuku and Wakana Uehara)	September 20, 2025	Wrestle Princess VI	Tokyo, Japan	1	190	2		
20	The IInspiration (Cassie Lee and Jessie McKay)	March 29, 2026	Grand Princess	Tokyo, Japan	1	36	1		
21	Hakuchuumu (Miu Watanabe and Rika Tatsumi)	May 4, 2026	Yes! Wonderland	Tokyo, Japan	2	152	2		
21	Shunrai Rekka Prism Greed (Yuki Aino and Haru Kazashiro)	October 3, 2026	Wrestle Princess VII	Tokyo, Japan	1 (3,1)	39+	1		

== Combined reigns ==
As of November 11, 2026.

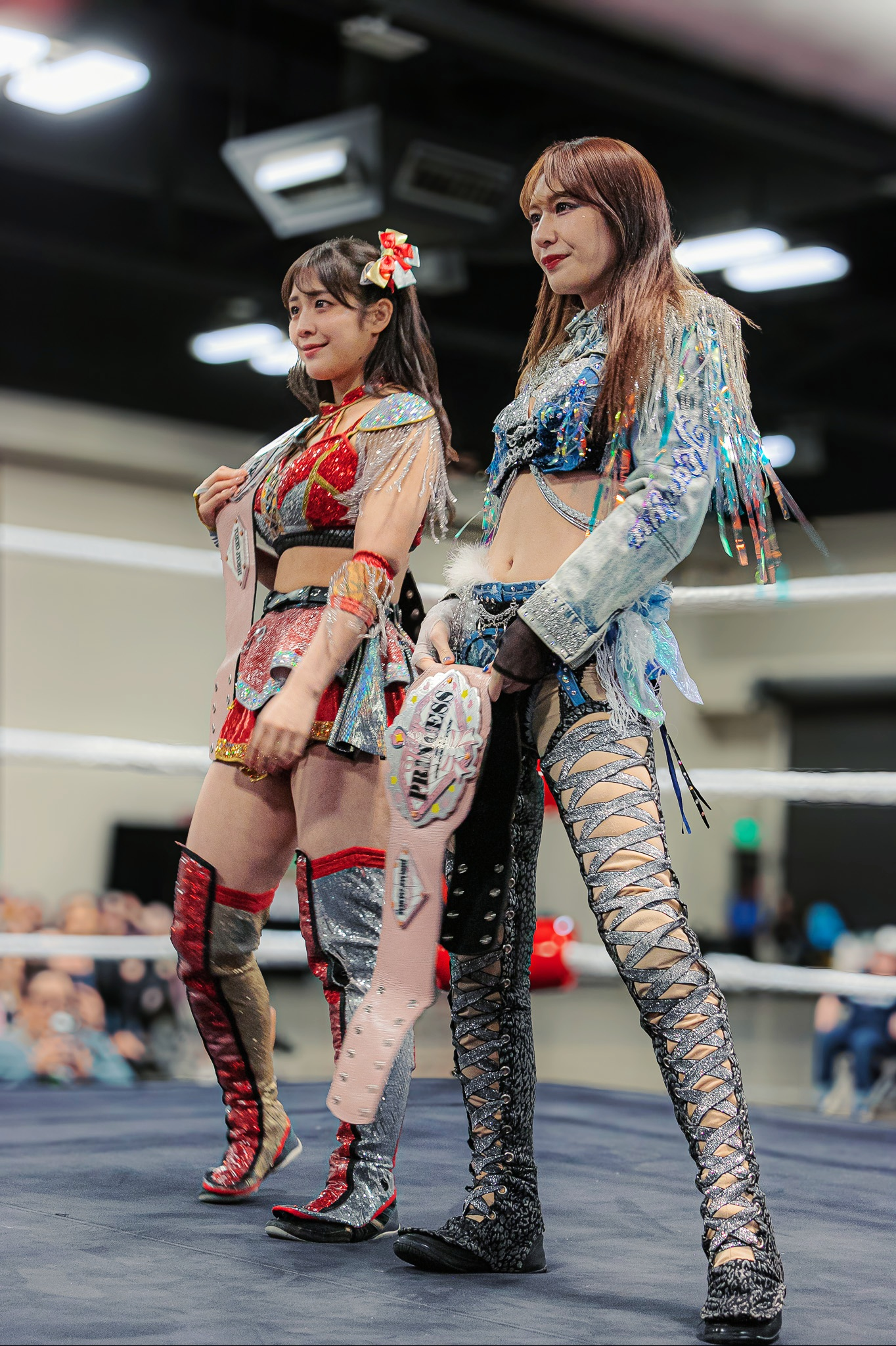
Former champions, Ober Eats (Yuki Kamifuku and Wakana Uehara) shown here wearing the first design of titles (2017–2026).

†	Indicates the current champions

=== By team ===
Rank	Team	No. of reigns	Combined defenses	Combined days
1	Magical Sugar Rabbits (Mizuki and Yuka Sakazaki)	3	12	630
2	Hakuchuumu (Miu Watanabe and Rika Tatsumi)	2	6	522
3	Ober Eats (Yuki Kamifuku and Wakana Uehara)	1	2	190
4	121000000 (Maki Itoh and Miyu Yamashita)	2	4	188
4	Kyoraku Kyomei (Hyper Misao and Shoko Nakajima)	1	3	188
6	Reiwa Ban AA Cannon (Saki Akai and Yuki Arai)	1	3	179
7	Daisy Monkey (Arisu Endo and Suzume)	1	2	175
7	Neo Biishiki-gun (Mei Saint-Michel and Sakisama)	1	2	175
9	Bakuretsu Sisters (Nodoka Tenma and Yuki Aino)	1	2	161
10	Neo Biishiki-gun (Misao and Sakisama)	1	3	148
11	MiraClians (Shoko Nakajima and Yuka Sakazaki)	1	2	112
12	Muscle JK (Marika Kobashi and Reika Saiki)	1	1	92
13	Neo Biishiki-gun (Azusa Christie and Sakisama)	1	2	89
14	Ryo Mizunami and Yuki Aino	1	0	87
15	Free WiFi (Hikari Noa and Nao Kakuta)	1	2	83
16	Wasteland War Party (Heidi Howitzer and Max the Impaler)	1	3	73
17	Shunrai Rekka Prism Greed † (Yuki Aino and Haru Kazashiro)	1	1	39+
18	The IInspiration (Cassie Lee and Jessie McKay)	1	1	36

=== By wrestler ===
Rank	Wrestler	No. of reigns	Combined defenses	Combined days
1	Yuka Sakazaki	4	14	742
2	Mizuki	3	12	630
3	Saki Akai/Sakisama	4	10	591
4	Rika Tatsumi	2	6	522
4	Miu Watanabe	2	6	522
6	Misao/Hyper Misao	2	6	336
7	Shoko Nakajima	2	5	300
8	Yuki Aino †	3	3	287+
9	Yuki Kamifuku	1	2	190
9	Wakana Uehara	1	2	190
11	Maki Itoh	2	4	188
11	Miyu Yamashita	2	4	188
13	Yuki Arai	1	3	179
14	Arisu Endo	1	2	175
14	Mei Saint-Michel	1	2	175
14	Suzume	1	2	175
17	Nodoka Tenma	1	2	161
18	Marika Kobashi	1	1	92
18	Reika Saiki	1	1	92
20	Azusa Christie	1	2	89
21	Ryo Mizunami	1	0	87
22	Hikari Noa	1	2	83
22	Nao Kakuta	1	2	83
24	Heidi Howitzer	1	3	73
24	Max the Impaler	1	3	73
26	Haru Kazashiro †	1	1	39+
27	Cassie Lee	1	1	36
27	Jessie McKay	1	1	36

== See also ==
- Princess of Princess Championship
- International Princess Championship
- GHC Women's Championship
