= CyberFight Festival =

- Promotions: CyberFight
- First event: CyberFight Festival 2021

CyberFight Festival is an annual Japanese professional wrestling event promoted by CyberFight. The event has been held since 2021 and aired worldwide on CyberFight's streaming service Wrestle Universe. The event is usually held in June and features all four brands under the CyberFight umbrella: DDT Pro-Wrestling (DDT), Pro Wrestling Noah, Tokyo Joshi Pro Wrestling (TJPW) and Ganbare☆Pro-Wrestling (GanPro).

== Events ==
#	Event	Date	City	Venue	Attendance	Main event	Ref.
1	CyberFight Festival 2021	June 6, 2021	Saitama, Japan	Saitama Super Arena	4,800	Keiji Mutoh (c) vs. Naomichi Marufuji for the GHC Heavyweight Championship	
2	CyberFight Festival 2022	June 12, 2022	Saitama, Japan	Saitama Super Arena	4,891	Go Shiozaki (c) vs. Satoshi Kojima for the GHC Heavyweight Championship	
(c) – refers to the champion(s) heading into the match
