= Marika Kobashi =

Japanese professional wrestler

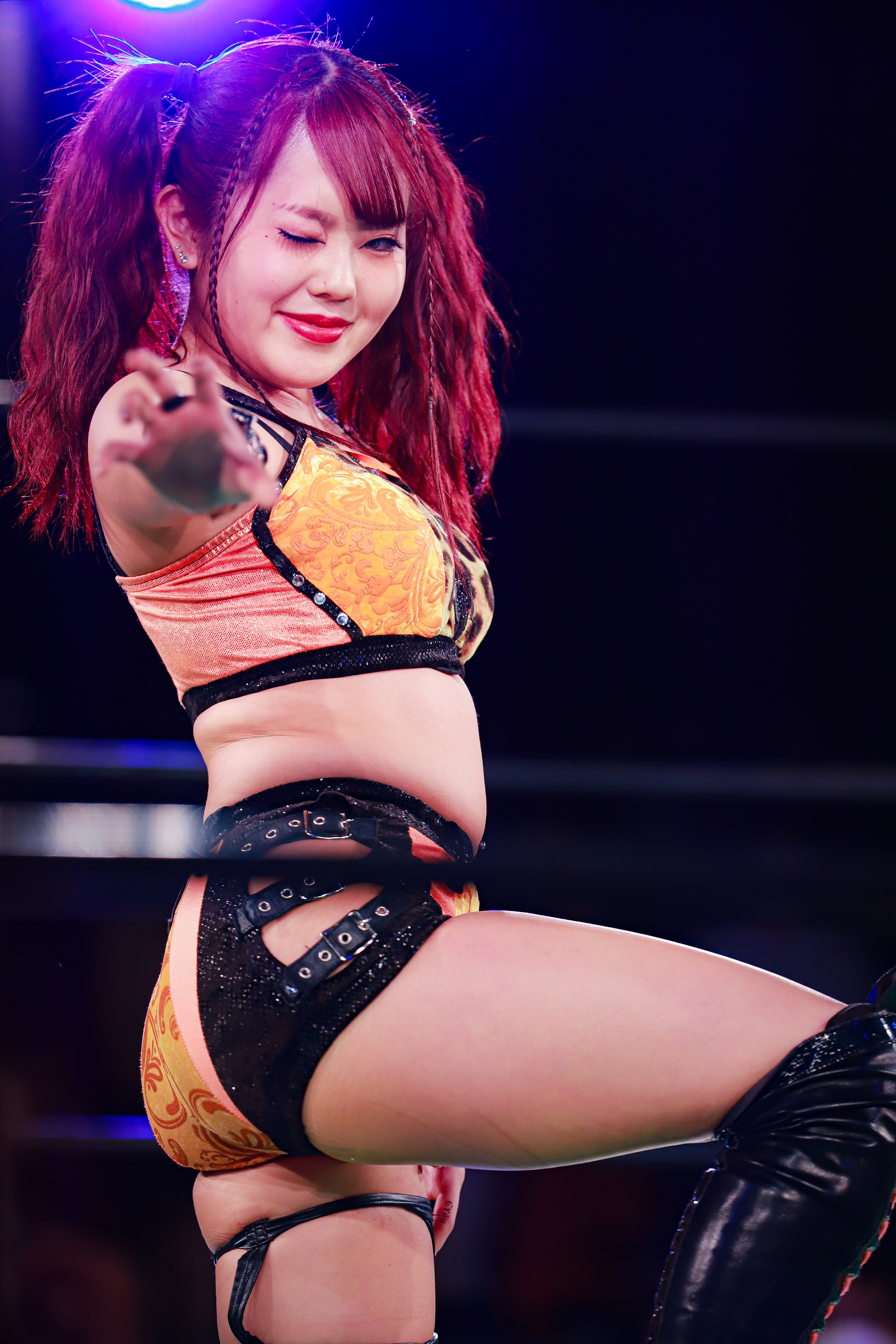
- Kobashi in 2023

Personal information
- Born: June 17, 2001 (age 25) Kanagawa, Japan

Professional wrestling career
- Ring name: Marika Kobashi
- Billed height: 154 cm (5 ft 1 in)
- Trained by: Cherry
- Debut: 2016

Marika Kobashi (小橋マリカ, Kobashi Marika) is a Japanese professional wrestler best known for her time in Japanese promotion Tokyo Joshi Pro Wrestling where she is a former Princess Tag Team Champion.

== Professional wrestling career ==
=== Tokyo Joshi Pro Wrestling (2016–2022) ===
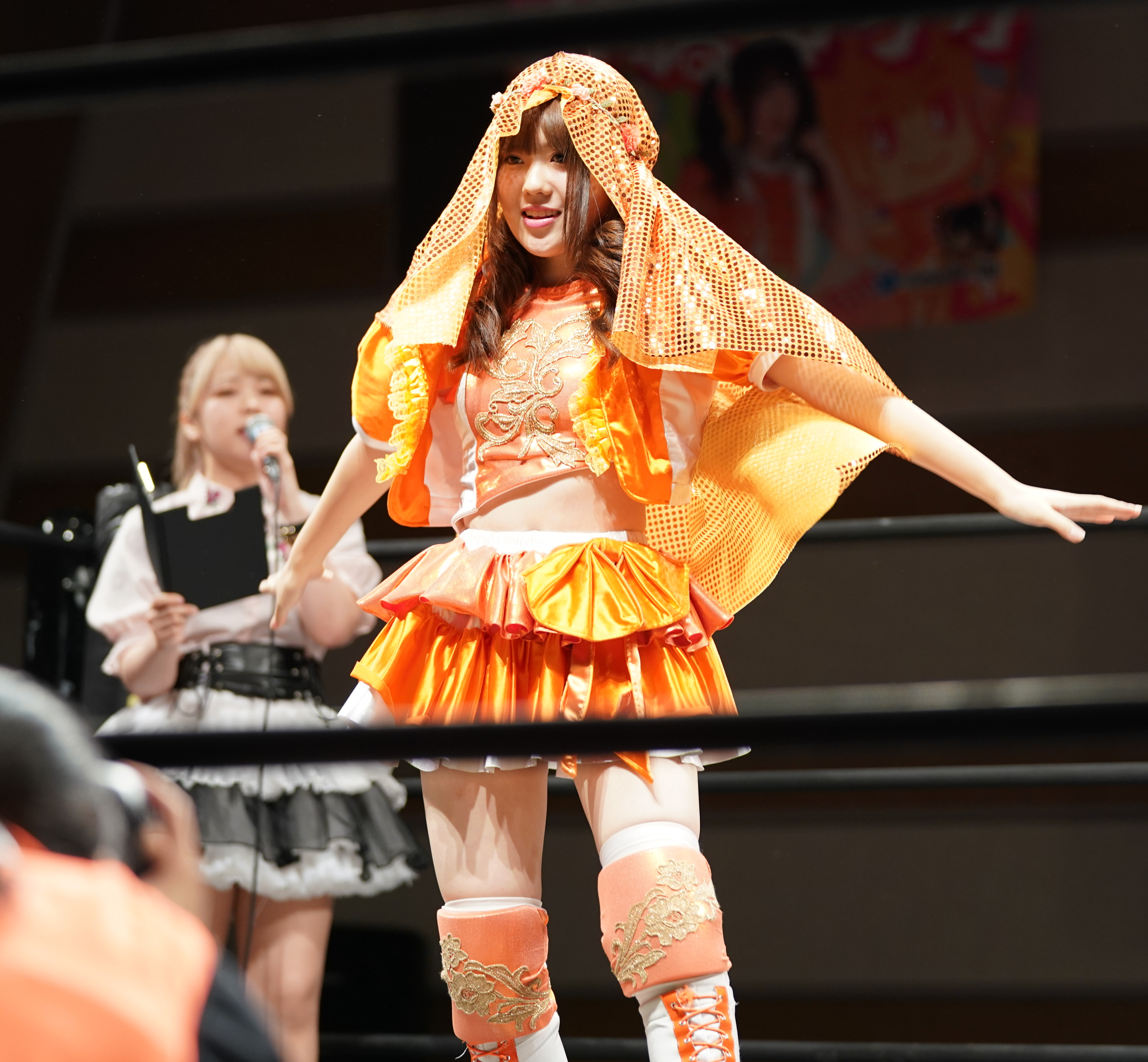
Marika playing tribute to Abdullah Kobayashi, for whom she takes her wrestling surname. One of Abdullah's signatures is wearing a Keffiyeh as part of his attire.

Kobashi made her professional wrestling debut at Tokyo Joshi Pro Wrestling's TJPW Tokyo Joshi Pro '16 on January 4, 2016, where she teamed up with Rika Tatsumi and defeated Azusa Takigawa and Erin in a tag team match. At Yes! Wonderland: Break Myself! on May 3, 2018, Kobashi won her first championship of the career, the Princess Tag Team Championship by teaming up with Reika Saiki as "Muscle JK Strikers" and defeating Neo Biishiki-gun (Azusa Christie and Sakisama). At Pinano Pipipipi Graduation Special on April 5, 2019, Kobashi competed in a 20-woman gauntlet battle royal also involving notable opponents such as Himawari Unagi, Mina Shirakawa and Natsumi Maki others.

At TJPW Additional Attack on June 17, 2021, Kobashi unsuccessfully challenged Hikari Noa for the International Princess Championship.

=== DDT Pro Wrestling (2016–2021) ===
Due to DDT and TJPW being in partnership, Kobashi wrestled in various events promoted by them. One of them is DDT Judgement. She made her first appearance at Judgement 2016: DDT 19th Anniversary on March 21 where she competed in a 13-woman battle royal also involving Ai Shimizu, Shoko Nakajima, Yuu and others. As for the DDT Peter Pan branch of events, Kobashi scored her first match at Ryōgoku Peter Pan 2017 on August 20 where she competed in a Rumble rules match for the Ironman Heavymetalweight Championship also involving Mizuki, Yuna Manase, Yuka Sakazaki and others.

At CyberFight Festival 2021, a cross-over event between DDT, TJPW and pro Wrestling Noah mainly promoted by CyberFight on June 6, Kobashi teamed up with Maki Itoh and Yuki Kamifuku as "Saitama Itoh Respect Army 2021" and picked up a victory over Hikari Noa, Mizuki and Yuki Arai by submission in a Six-woman tag team match.

=== World Wonder Ring Stardom (2023) ===
Kobashi is scheduled to make her first appearance in World Wonder Ring Stardom on January 20, 2023, at Stardom New Blood 7, where she will compete against Lady C and Ruaka in a three-way match.

== Championships and accomplishments ==
- DDT Pro-Wrestling
  - Ironman Heavymetalweight Championship (2 times)
- Tokyo Joshi Pro Wrestling
  - Tokyo Princess Tag Team Championship (1 time) – with Reika Saiki
