= Arisu Endo =

Japanese professional wrestler

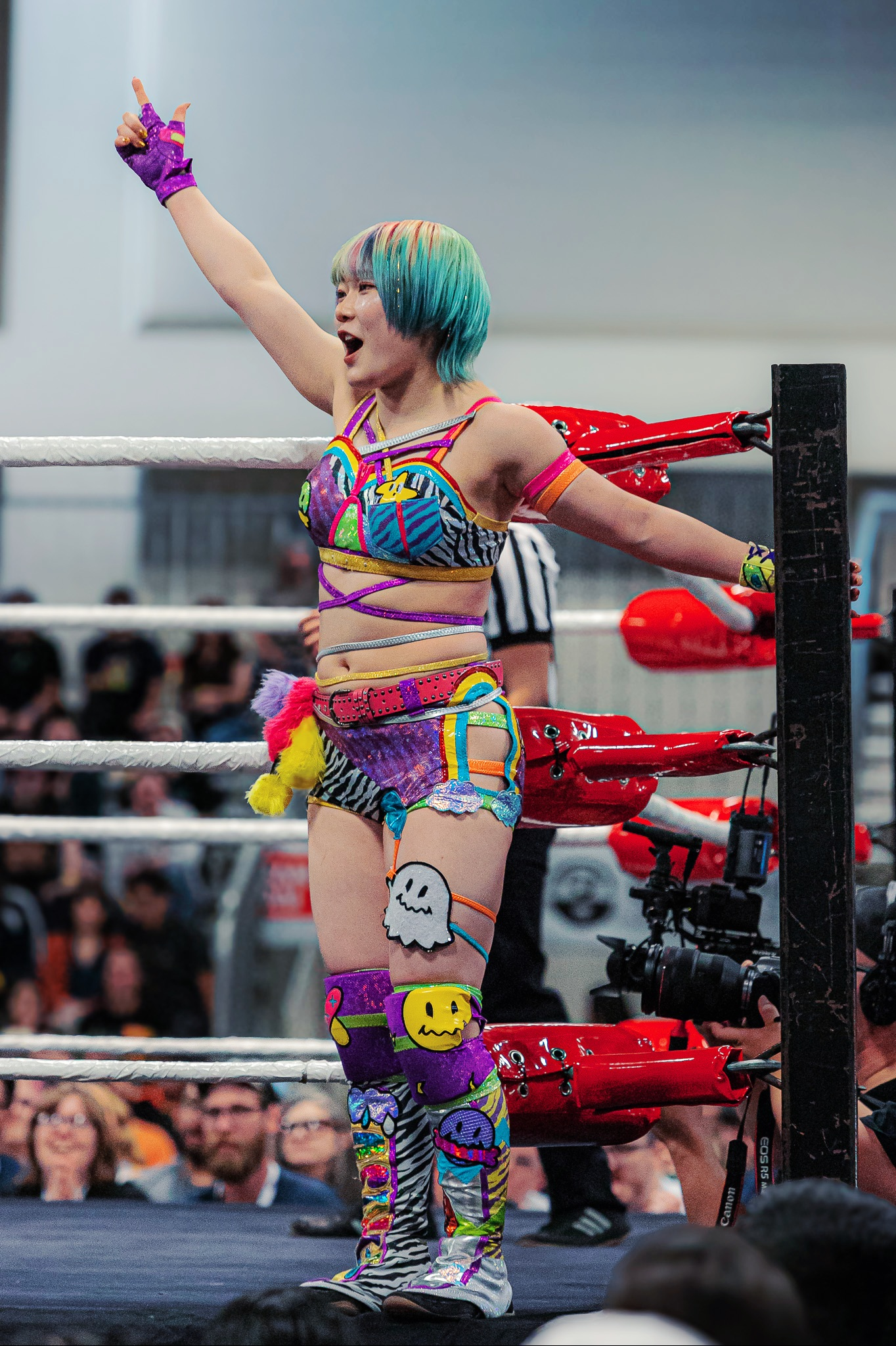
- Endo in March 2026

Personal information
- Born: April 27, 1998 (age 28) Aizuwakamatsu, Fukushima, Japan

Professional wrestling career
- Ring name: Arisu Endo
- Billed height: 150 cm (4 ft 11 in)
- Debut: 2021

Arisu Endo (遠藤有栖, Endo Arisu) is a Japanese professional wrestler competing in Tokyo Joshi Pro-Wrestling (TJPW), where she is a former one-time International Princess Champion and also a former tag team champion.

== Professional wrestling career ==
=== Tokyo Joshi Pro-Wrestling (2021–present) ===
Endo made her professional wrestling debut in Tokyo Joshi Pro-Wrestling at TJPW Tokyo Joshi Pro '21 on April 1, where she fell short to Suzume in singles competition. She competed or various titles promoted by TJPW. At TJPW All Rise '23 on October 27, 2023, she competed in a battle royal for the number one contendership for the International Princess Championship won by Shoko Nakajima and also involving Mahiro Kiryu, Miu Watanabe, Raku, Rika Tatsumi, Suzume and Yuki Kamifuku. At Wrestle Grand Princess '24 on March 31, 2024, she teamed up with Suzume and defeated Ryo Mizunami and Yuki Aino to win the Princess Tag Team Championship.

During her time with the promotion, Endo competed in the two signature tournaments promoted by TJPW. As for the Tokyo Princess Cup, she made her first appearance at the 2021 edition where she fell short to Mahiro Kiryu in the first rounds. One year later at the 2022 edition, she fell short to Miu Watanabe again in the first rounds. At the 2023 edition, Endo defeated Mahiro Kiryu in the first rounds but fell short to Yuki Arai in the second ones.

Endo won the 2024 edition of the Futari wa Princess tournament by teaming up with her "Daisy Monkey" tag team partner Suzume as they defeated Miu Watanabe and Rika Tatsumi in the finals.

Endo also competed at Wrestle Princess, the biggest annual event promoted by TJPW. She made her first appearance at the 2021 event, where she teamed up with Suzume in a losing effort against Riho and Shoko Nakajima. At Wrestle Princess III on October 9, 2022, she teamed up with Kaya Toribami in a losing effort against Juria Nagano and Moka Miyamoto. At the fourth edition of the event from October 9, 2023, she teamed up with Himawari and Kaya Toribami to defeat Harukaze, Riara and Yoshiko Hasegawa.

=== Japanese independent circuit (2019–present) ===
Endo often competes in the CyberFight branded sister promotions Pro Wrestling Noah and DDT Pro-Wrestling as developmental talent sent by TJPW.

==== Pro Wrestling Noah (2021–2022) ====
Endo participated in the CyberFight Festival, a cross-over event promoted bt TJPW, Noah and DDT. She made her first appearance at the 2021 edition of the event where she teamed up with Mirai Maiumi, Haruka Neko and Moka Miyamoto to defeat Nao Kakuta, Raku, Pom Harajuku, Mahiro Kiryu and Kaya Toribami in a Ten-woman tag team match. At CyberFight Festival 2022 she teamed up with Nao Kakuta, Mahiro Kiryu, Moka Miyamoto and Kaya Toribami to defeat Hyper Misao, Yuki Aino, Yuuri, Pom Harajuku and Haruna Neko.

==== DDT Pro-Wrestling (2019–present) ====
Endo made her first appearance in a DDT Pro-Wrestling event at Ultimate Party 2023 where she teamed up with Suzume and Wakana Uehara in a losing effort against Yuki Arai, Moka Miyamoto and Shin Suzuki.

At DPW x Gatoh Move Tokyo Crossover, a cross-over event promoted by Gatoh Move Pro Wrestling and Deadlock Pro-Wrestling on April 27, 2023, Endo fell short to Mei Suruga.

At GCW Vs. TJPW, a cross-over event promoted by TJPW in partnership with Game Changer Wrestling on April 6, 2024, Endo defeated Shazza McKenzie in singles competition.

== Championships and accomplishments ==
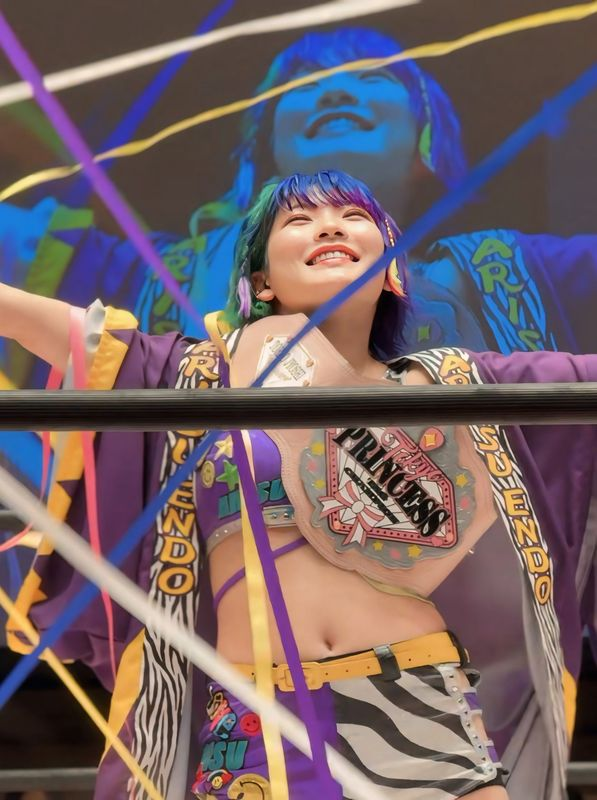
Endo in 2024 as Princess Tag Team Champion

- Pro Wrestling Illustrated
  - Ranked No. 112 of the top 250 female wrestlers in the PWI Women's 250 in 2025
- Tokyo Joshi Pro-Wrestling
  - Princess Tag Team Championship (1 time) – with Suzume
  - International Princess Championship (1 time)
  - Futari Wa Princess Max Heart Tournament (2024) – with Suzume
