= Raku (wrestler) =

Japanese professional wrestler

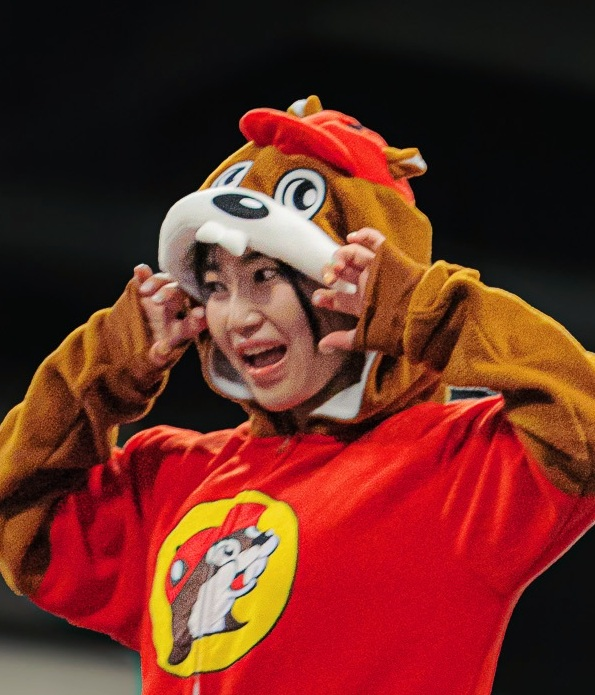
- Raku in March 2026

Personal information
- Born: December 5, 1997 (age 28) Tokyo, Japan

Professional wrestling career
- Ring name: Raku
- Billed height: 160 cm (5 ft 3 in)
- Trained by: Makoto Oishi
- Debut: January 4, 2018

Raku (らく; born December 5, 1997) is a Japanese idol and professional wrestler working for the Japanese promotion Tokyo Joshi Pro Wrestling.

== Professional wrestling career ==
On August 12, 2017, in a new project in collaboration with DDT Pro-Wrestling, an Up Up Girls (Pro Wrestling) audition was announced, and four successful candidates were chosen, Miu Watanabe, Raku, Hinano, and Hikari Noa. Raku changed her name in katakana and made her stage debut at @JAM EXPO on August 27.

=== Tokyo Joshi Pro Wrestling (2018–present) ===
On January 4, 2018, at TJPW Tokyo Joshi Pro '18, Raku made her professional wrestling debut, where she teamed up with Hikari Noa as "Up Up Girls", losing to fellow stablemates Pinano Pipipipi and Miu Watanabe in a tag team match. On March 31, at TJPW Yokodai Station Pro Wrestling 2018, she wrestled her first singles match against Yuka Sakazaki in a losing effort. On June 1, 2019, Raku participated in the Tokyo Princess Cup for the first time, where she lost to Maki Itoh in the first round. On April 29, 2023, at TJPW Precious Time, Raku, along with Pom Harajuku and Yuki Aino won the Shinagawa Three Woman Festival.

=== DDT Pro Wrestling (2018–present) ===
Due to TJPW being under the same CyberFight flagship, Raku has competed in various of DDT Pro Wrestling's events. She made her first appearance at DDT Tokyo Idol Festival 2018 on August 3, where she teamed up with her Up Up Girls stablemates Hikari Noa, Pinano Pipipipi, Miu Watanabe, and Danshoku Dino to defeat Hyper Misao, Makoto Oishi, Yuki Kamifuku, Akari Saho, Aya Kajishima, Mayu Yoshikawa and Sanshiro Takagi. On August 2, 2019, at DDT Street Pro Wrestling In Tokyo Idol Festival 2019, Raku competed in a battle royal for the Ironman Heavymetalweight Championship won by Momomi Wagatsuma who dethroned the previous champion Yukio Sakaguchi. The match also involved other notable opponents such as Yukio Naya and other idols like Natsumi Misake and Rise Shiokawa. Another signature event in which Raku competed was the DDT Ultimate Party, making her first appearance at the Ultimate Party 2019 edition on November 3, where she teamed up with Haruna Neko, Mirai Maiumi, Pom Harajuku and lost to Hikari Noa, Mahiro Kiryu, Suzume and Yumi.

=== Pro Wrestling Noah (2021) ===
At CyberFight Festival 2021, a cross over event promoted by all DDT, TJPW and Pro Wrestling Noah on June 6, 2021, in where Kaya Toribami also debuted, Raku teamed with Toribami, Nao Kakuta, Pom Harajuku and Mahiro Kiryu to face BeeStar (Mirai Maiumi and Suzume), Haruna Neko, Moka Miyamoto and Arisu Endo. In the end, Maiumi hit Kiryu with a lariat to win the match via pinfall. On June 12, 2022, at CyberFight Festival 2022, she teamed up with Aino, Misao, Harajuku and Neko in a losing effort against Kakuta, Kiryu, Miyamoto, Endo and Toribami.

== Championships and accomplishments ==
- DDT Pro-Wrestling
  - Ironman Heavymetalweight Championship (4 times)
- Setup Thailand Pro-Wrestling
  - Setup All Asia Women's Championship (1 time)
- Tokyo Joshi Pro Wrestling
  - Shinagawa Three Woman Festival (2023) – with Pom Harajuku and Yuki Aino
  - Yuki Arai Battle Royal
