= Princess of Princess Championship =

Women's professional wrestling championship, Japan

- Third and current design of the title (2026–present)

Details
- Promotion: CyberFight
- Brand: Tokyo Joshi Pro-Wrestling
- Date established: October 12, 2015
- Current champion: Shoko Nakajima
- Date won: November 8, 2026

Other names
- Tokyo Princess of Princess Championship (2016–2019); Princess of Princess Championship (2019–present)
Statistics
- First champion: Miyu Yamashita
- Most reigns: Miyu Yamashita (4 times)
- Longest reign: Miyu Yamashita (484 days)
- Shortest reign: Yuka Sakazaki (83 days)
- Oldest champion: Shoko Nakajima (35 years, 112 days)
- Youngest champion: Miyu Yamashita (20 years, 293 days)

The Princess of Princess Championship (Japanese: プリンセス・オブ・プリンセス王座, Hepburn: Purinsesu Obu Purinsesu Ōza) is a women's professional wrestling championship owned by Tokyo Joshi Pro Wrestling (TJPW). The title, which is situated at the top of TJPW's championship hierarchy, was introduced on October 12, 2015, and the inaugural champion was crowned on January 4, 2016, when Miyu Yamashita defeated Shoko Nakajima. The current champion is Shoko Nakajima, who is in her third reign. She won the title by defeating Yuki Arai at TJPW All Rise '26 in Tokyo, Japan, on November 11, 2026.

== History ==
On January 4, 2016, Miyu Yamashita was crowned the inaugural Tokyo Princess of Princess Champion by defeating Shoko Nakajima at Tokyo Joshi Pro '16.

On July 16, 2019, the title was re-named as the Princess of Princess Championship.

=== Belt design ===
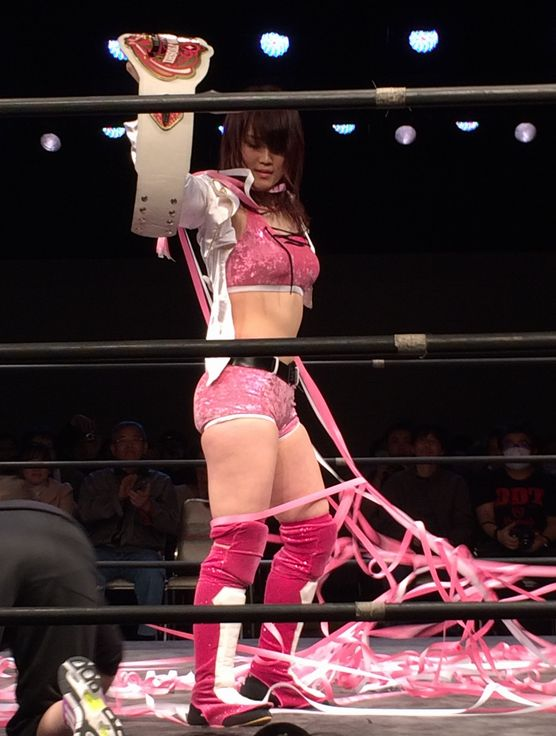
Miyu Yamashita with the first belt design (2016–2019)

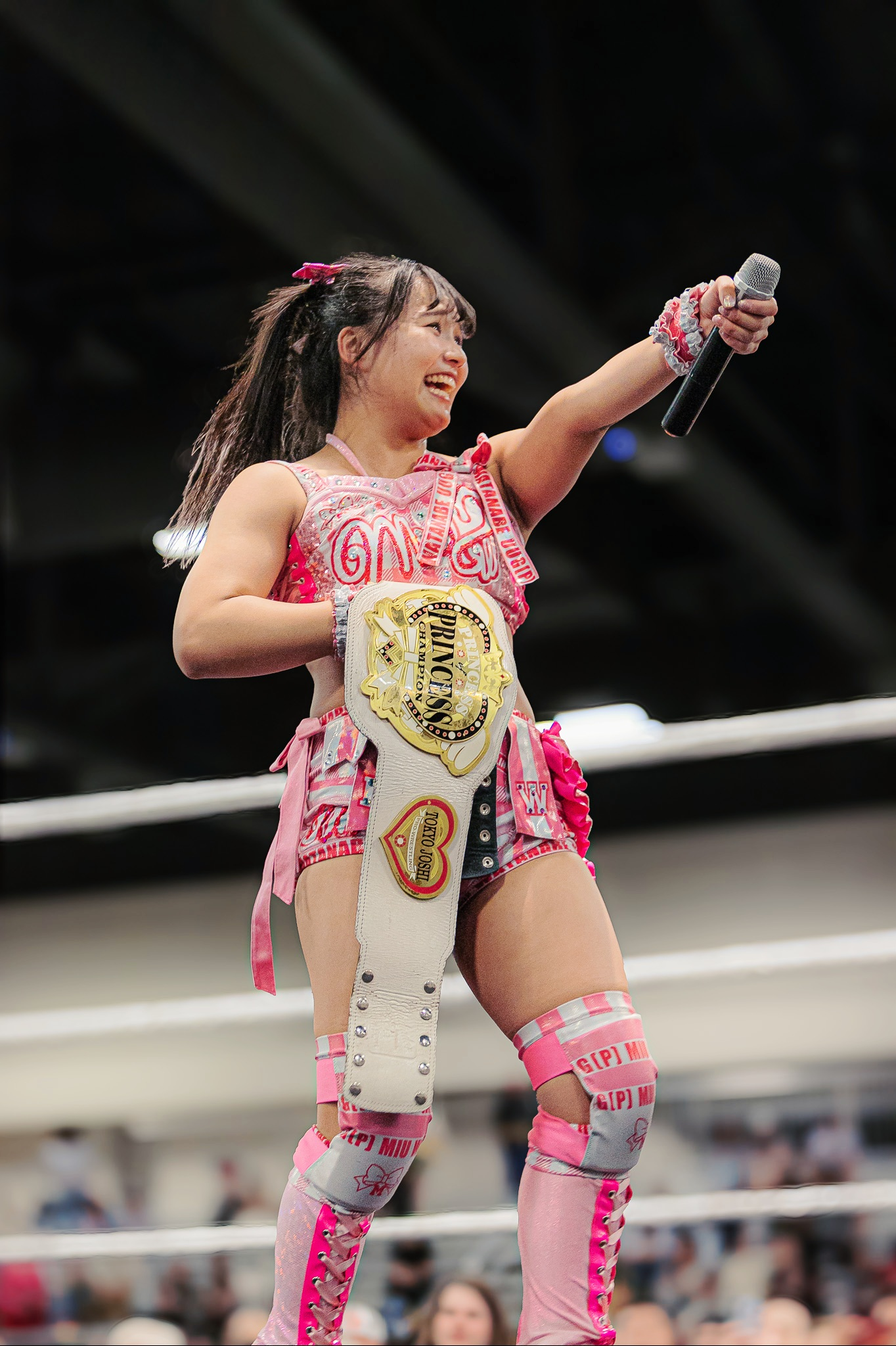
Miu Watanabe with the second belt design (2019–2026)

The first version of the belt was introduced on October 12, 2015, when TJPW announced the creation of the title. Just like all the versions, the original belt also featured a white strap with heart-shaped main and sideplates coloured with shades of gold and pink. The first design of the title was used between 2016 and 2019. The “Tokyo” part of the title’s name was dropped in July 2019 as part of the promotion’s plans to expand their global presence. A redesigned second generation title belt replaced the original on September 2019, with only the main plate being changed. The current and third design of the belt was announced in February 2026 and revealed during the Grand Princess '26 pay-per-view from March 29. It features golden main and side plates.

== Reigns ==
As of November 8, 2026, there have been al total of 18 reigns shared between nine different champions. Miyu Yamashita was the inaugural champion. Yamashita holds the record for most reigns at four. Shoko Nakajima is the oldest champion at 35 years old, while Yamashita during her first reign is the youngest at 20 years old. Yamashita's second reign is the longest at 484 days, while Sakazaki's first reign is the shortest at 83 days.

Shoko Nakajima is the current champion, in her third reign. She won the title by defeating Yuki Arai at TJPW All Rise '26 in Tokyo, Japan, on November 8, 2026.

=== Names ===
Name	Years
Tokyo Princess of Princess Championship	January 4, 2016 – July 16, 2019
Princess of Princess Championship	July 16, 2019 – present

Key
No.	Overall reign number
Reign	Reign number for the specific champion
Days	Number of days held
Defenses	Number of successful defenses
+	Current reign is changing daily

No.	Champion	Championship change			Reign statistics			Notes	Ref.
No.	Champion	Date	Event	Location	Reign	Days	Defenses	Notes	Ref.
1	Miyu Yamashita	January 4, 2016	Tokyo Joshi Pro	Tokyo, Japan	1	262	2	Yamashita defeated Shoko Nakajima in a decision match to become inaugural champion.	
2	Yuu	September 22, 2016	Shinjuku Love Rin	Tokyo, Japan	1	255	4		
3	Yuka Sakazaki	June 4, 2017	At this Time, Get Excited in Shinjuku!	Tokyo, Japan	1	83	0		
4	Reika Saiki	August 26, 2017	Brand New Wrestling: The Beginning of a New Era	Tokyo, Japan	1	131	2		
5	Miyu Yamashita	January 4, 2018	Tokyo Joshi Pro	Tokyo, Japan	2	484	10		
6	Shoko Nakajima	May 3, 2019	Yes! Wonderland 2019: Opportunity is There	Tokyo, Japan	1	184	3	During Nakajima's reign, the title was re-named to Princess of Princess Championship.	
7	Yuka Sakazaki	November 3, 2019	Ultimate Party	Tokyo, Japan	2	428	4	This was a DDT Pro Wrestling event.	
8	Rika Tatsumi	January 4, 2021	Tokyo Joshi Pro	Tokyo, Japan	1	120	2		
9	Miyu Yamashita	May 4, 2021	Yes! Wonderland 2021: We Are Still In The Middle Of Our Dreams	Tokyo, Japan	3	319	4		
10	Shoko Nakajima	March 19, 2022	Grand Princess	Tokyo, Japan	2	204	4		
11	Yuka Sakazaki	October 9, 2022	Wrestle Princess III	Tokyo, Japan	3	160	2		
12	Mizuki	March 18, 2023	Grand Princess	Tokyo, Japan	1	205	3		
13	Miyu Yamashita	October 9, 2023	Wrestle Princess IV	Tokyo, Japan	4	174	3		
14	Miu Watanabe	March 31, 2024	Grand Princess	Tokyo, Japan	1	279	5		
15	Mizuki	January 4, 2025	Tokyo Joshi Pro	Tokyo, Japan	2	259	3		
16	Miu Watanabe	September 20, 2025	Wrestle Princess VI	Tokyo, Japan	2	190	4		
17	Yuki Arai	March 29, 2026	Grand Princess	Tokyo, Japan	1	224	5		
18	Shoko Nakajima	November 8, 2026	TJPW All Rise '26	Tokyo, Japan	3	0+	0		

== Combined reigns ==
As of November 8, 2026.

†	Indicates the current champion

Rank	Wrestler	No. of reigns	Combined defenses	Combined days
1	Miyu Yamashita	4	19	1,239
2	Yuka Sakazaki	3	6	671
3	Miu Watanabe	2	9	469
4	Mizuki	2	6	464
5	Shoko Nakajima †	3	7	388+
6	Yuu	1	4	255
7	Yuki Arai	1	5	224
8	Reika Saiki	1	2	131
9	Rika Tatsumi	1	2	120

== See also ==
- International Princess Championship
- Princess Tag Team Championship
- GHC Women's Championship
