= Yuki Arai =

Japanese professional wrestler (born 1998)

- Arai in May 2026

Personal information
- Born: May 7, 1998 (age 28) Kyoto, Kyoto Prefecture, Japan
- Website: https://araiyuki.com/

Professional wrestling career
- Ring name: Yuki Arai
- Billed height: 164 cm (5 ft 5 in)
- Trained by: Miyu Yamashita
- Debut: 2018

Yuki Arai (荒井優希, Arai Yuki) is a Japanese professional wrestler and idol working in the Japanese promotion Tokyo Joshi Pro-Wrestling (TJPW) where she is a former Princess of Princess Champion. She is a former member of the Japanese idol group SKE48.

== Professional wrestling career ==
=== DDT Pro-Wrestling (2018; 2021–present) ===
Arai made her professional wrestling debut in DDT Pro-Wrestling at DDT Live! Maji Manji #21 on October 28, 2018, where she competed in a gauntlet battle royal to defend the Ironman Heavymetalweight Championship she won three weeks days earlier at a house show against her SKE48 senior Kaori Matsumura. The match was won by Maki Itoh and also involved various other opponents including Cherry, Emi Sakura, Mizuki, Saki Akai, and Yuki Kamifuku. Arai resumed her professional wrestling career following a two-and-a-half-year hiatus, primarily competing in the sister promotion Tokyo Joshi Pro-Wrestling. Arai made her return to DDT at Never Mind 2022 on December 29. She reunited with her "Reiwa Ban AA Cannon" tag team partner Saki Akai, and together they were victorious over Saori Anou and Riko Kawahata.

=== Tokyo Joshi Pro-Wrestling (2021–present) ===
Arai's first appearance in Tokyo Joshi Pro-Wrestling was at Yes! Wonderland 2021 on May 4, where she and Miu Watanabe were defeated by Arisu Endo and Maki Itoh. During her tenure with the promotion, she sought to obtain various championship titles. At Tokyo Joshi 2021 Autumn on December 4, she participated in a battle royal to determine the number one contender for the International Princess Championship won by Maki Itoh. At Grand Princess '22 on March 19, she unsuccessfully challenged Itoh for the same title. Arai achieved her first Princess Tag Team Championship victory by forming a partnership with Saki Akai and prevailing over Magical Sugar Rabbits (Mizuki and Yuka Sakazaki) at Summer Sun Princess '22 on July 9. They lost the titles at Tokyo Joshi Pro '23 on January 4 to Wasteland War Party (Heidi Howitzer and Max the Impaler). On March 29, 2026, at Grand Princess '26, Arai defeated Watanabe to win the Princess of Princess Championship for the first time.

=== Pro Wrestling Noah (2021) ===
As a brand of the CyberFight promotion, TJPW participated in cross-over events held between the three promotions owned by CyberFight: DDT, TJPW and Pro Wrestling Noah. At CyberFight Festival 2021, held on June 6, she joined forces with Hikari Noa and Mizuki in a losing effort against Maki Itoh, Marika Kobashi and Yuki Kamifuku.

At the Keiji Muto Grand Final Pro-Wrestling "Last-Love" event on February 21, 2023, Arai teamed up with Mizuki, Maki Itoh and Miu Watanabe in a losing effort to Yuka Sakazaki, Miyu Yamashita, Shoko Nakajima and Rika Tatsumi.

== Championships and accomplishments ==
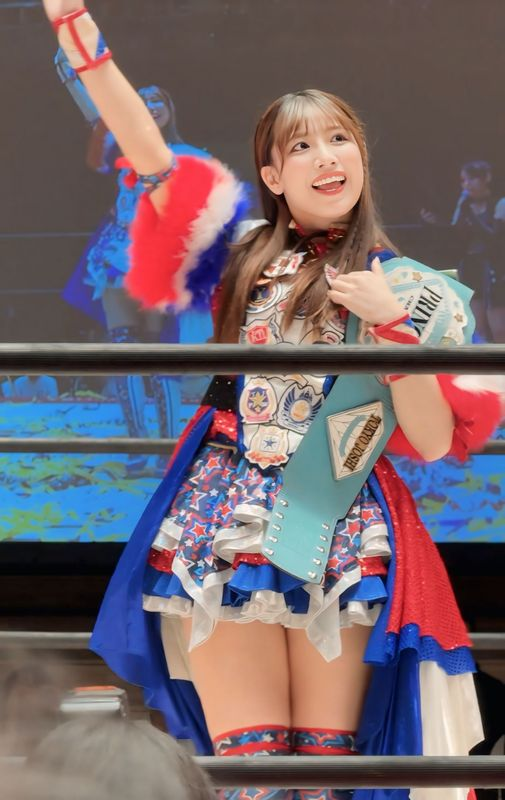
Arai is a former one-time International Princess Champion.

- DDT Pro-Wrestling
  - Ironman Heavymetalweight Championship (1 time)
- Pro Wrestling Illustrated
  - Ranked No. 108 of the top 250 female wrestlers in the PWI Women's 250 in 2024
- Tokyo Joshi Pro Wrestling
  - Princess of Princess Championship (1 time)
  - International Princess Championship (1 time)
  - Princess Tag Team Championship (1 time) – with Saki Akai
  - Third Grand Slam Champion
- Tokyo Sports Puroresu Awards
  - Rookie Of The Year (2021)
