= Wrestle Princess II =

2021 Tokyo Joshi Pro-Wrestling event

- Promotional poster featuring Maki Itoh and Miyu Yamashita
- Promotion: CyberFight
- Brand: Tokyo Joshi Pro-Wrestling
- Date: October 9, 2021
- City: Tokyo, Japan
- Venue: Ota City General Gymnasium
- Attendance: 914
- Tagline: "The biggest festival; the pinnacle of competition" (Note: Japanese: 最大級の祭典 最高峰の闘い, Hepburn: Saidai-kyū no saiten Saikōhō no tatakai)

Pay-per-view chronology
← Previous; TJPW Live With Your Time	Next → TJPW Let's Take Bravely

Wrestle Princess chronology
← Previous; I	Next → III

Wrestle Princess II was a professional wrestling event promoted by CyberFight's sub-brand Tokyo Joshi Pro-Wrestling. It was the second annual Wrestle Princess and took place on October 9, 2021, in Tokyo, Japan, at the Ota City General Gymnasium with limited attendance due in part to the ongoing COVID-19 pandemic at the time. The event aired on CyberAgent's AbemaTV online linear television service and CyberFight's streaming service Wrestle Universe.

== Background ==
=== Storylines ===
The event featured eight professional wrestling matches that resulted from scripted storylines, where wrestlers portrayed villains, heroes, or less distinguishable characters in the scripted events that built tension and culminated in a wrestling match or series of matches.

=== Event ===
The event started with the six-woman tag team confrontation between Pom Harajuku, Raku and Ram Kaicho, and Haruna Neko, Kaya Toribami and Mahiro Kiryu, solded with the victory of the initial team. In the second bout, Nodoka Tenma picked up a win over Hyper Misao and Rika Tatsumi in a three-way match. Next up, Asuka and Yuki Kamifuku outmatched Marika Kobashi and Nao Kakuta in tag team action. In the fourth match, Riho and Shoko Nakajima defeated Arisu Endo and Suzume in another tag team bout. Next up, Oz Academy's Aja Kong teamed up with Moka Miyamoto to defeat Miu Watanabe and Yuki Arai. Next up, Hikari Noa defeated Yuki Aino to secure the third consecutive defense of the International Princess Championship in that respective reign. In the semi main event, Mizuki and Yuka Sakazaki defeated Mei Saint-Michel and Sakisama to win the Princess Tag Team Championship, ending the champion team's reign at 175 days and two successful defenses.

In the main event, Miyu Yamashita defeated Maki Itoh to retain the Princess of Princess Championship for the third time consecutively in that respective reign.

== Results ==
No.	Results	Stipulations	Times
1	Pom Harajuku, Raku and Ram Kaicho defeated Haruna Neko, Kaya Toribami and Mahiro Kiryu	Six-woman tag team match	10:09
2	Nodoka Tenma defeated Hyper Misao and Rika Tatsumi	Three-way match	10:55
3	Asuka and Yuki Kamifuku defeated Marika Kobashi and Nao Kakuta	Tag team match	10:30
4	Riho and Shoko Nakajima defeated Arisu Endo and Suzume	Tag team match	14:52
5	Aja Kong and Moka Miyamoto defeated Miu Watanabe and Yuki Arai	Tag team match	16:03
6	Hikari Noa (c) defeated Yuki Aino	Singles match for the International Princess Championship	11:27
7	Magical Sugar Rabbits (Mizuki and Yuka Sakazaki) defeated Neo Biishiki-gun (Mei Saint-Michel and Sakisama) (c)	Tag team match for the Princess Tag Team Championship	18:33
8	Miyu Yamashita (c) defeated Maki Itoh	Singles match for the Princess of Princess Championship	17:23
(c) / – the champion(s) heading into the match
