= Wrestle Princess III =

2022 Tokyo Joshi Pro-Wrestling event

- Promotional poster featuring Shoko Nakajima and Yuka Sakazaki
- Promotion: CyberFight
- Brand: Tokyo Joshi Pro-Wrestling
- Date: October 9, 2022
- City: Tokyo, Japan
- Venue: Tokyo Dome City Hall
- Attendance: 1,007

Pay-per-view chronology
← Previous; City Circuit ~ Nagoya Performance	Next → Tokyo Joshi Pro '23

Wrestle Princess chronology
← Previous; II	Next → IV

Wrestle Princess III was a professional wrestling event promoted by CyberFight's sub-brand Tokyo Joshi Pro-Wrestling. It was the third annual Wrestle Princess and took place on October 9, 2022, in Tokyo, Japan, at the Tokyo Dome City Hall with limited attendance due in part to the ongoing COVID-19 pandemic at the time. The event aired on CyberAgent's AbemaTV online linear television service and CyberFight's streaming service Wrestle Universe.

== Background ==
=== Storylines ===
The event featured nine professional wrestling matches that resulted from scripted storylines, where wrestlers portrayed villains, heroes, or less distinguishable characters in the scripted events that built tension and culminated in a wrestling match or series of matches.

=== Event ===
The event started with the confrontation between Arisu Endo and Kaya Toribami, and Juria Nagano and Moka Miyamoto solded with the victory of the latter team. The bout was broadcast live on TJPW's YouTube channel.

In the first main card bout, Nao Kakuta, Yoshiko Hasegawa and Yuna Manase defeat Haruna Neko and Toyo Mates (Mahiro Kiryu and Yuki Kamifuku) in six-woman tag team action. Next up, Ryo Mizunami defeated Suzume in singles competition. In the fourth bout, Mizuki picked up a win over Hyper Misao in a TDC rules match. In the fifth bout, Max the Impaler, Rika Tatsumi and Yuki Aino defeated Aja Kong, Pom Harajuku and Raku. Next up, Maki Itoh and Miyu Yamashita outmatched Hikari Noa and All Elite Wrestling's Riho in tag team action. In the seventh bout, Miu Watanabe defeated Alex Windsor to win the International Princess Championship. In the semi main event, Saki Akai and Yuki Arai defeated Pro-Wrestling: EVE's Nightshade and Rhia O'Reilly to secure the second consecutive defense of the Princess Tag Team Championship in that respective reign.

In the main event, 2022 Tokyo Princess Cup winner Yuka Sakazaki defeated Shoko Nakajima to win the Princess of Princess Championship for the third time in her career, ending the latter's reign at 204 days and four successful defenses.

== Results ==
No.	Results	Stipulations	Times
1^{P}	Juria Nagano and Moka Miyamoto defeated Arisu Endo and Kaya Toribami	Tag team match	9:24
2	Nao Kakuta, Yoshiko Hasegawa and Yuna Manase defeated Haruna Neko and Toyo Mates (Mahiro Kiryu and Yuki Kamifuku)	Six-woman tag team match	12:11
3	Ryo Mizunami defeated Suzume	Singles match	11:05
4	Mizuki defeated Hyper Misao	TDC rules match	8:25
5	Max the Impaler, Rika Tatsumi and Yuki Aino defeated Aja Kong, Pom Harajuku and Raku	Six-woman tag team match	12:48
6	121000000 (Maki Itoh and Miyu Yamashita) defeated Hikari Noa and Riho	Tag team match	13:44
7	Miu Watanabe defeated Alex Windsor (c)	Singles match for the International Princess Championship	10:21
8	Reiwa AA Cannon (Saki Akai and Yuki Arai) (c) defeated The Uprising (Nightshade and Rhia O'Reilly)	Tag team match for the Princess Tag Team Championship	16:57
9	Yuka Sakazaki defeated Shoko Nakajima (c)	Singles match for the Princess of Princess Championship	22:44
(c) / – the champion(s) heading into the match; P / – the match was broadcast on the pre-show
