= CyberFight Festival 2022 =

2022 CyberFight event

- Promotional poster featuring Kenoh, Shoko Nakajima, Go Shiozaki, Satoshi Kojima, and Daisuke Sasaki
- Promotion: CyberFight
- Brand(s): DDT Pro-Wrestling (DDT); Pro Wrestling Noah (Noah); Tokyo Joshi Pro Wrestling (TJPW); Ganbare☆Pro-Wrestling (GanPro)
- Date: June 12, 2022
- City: Saitama, Japan
- Venue: Saitama Super Arena
- Attendance: 4,891
- Tagline: Come on, it's the festival. (Note: Japanese: さぁ、祭りだ。, Hepburn: Saa, matsuri da.)

Event chronology
| ← Previous; NOAH; Dream On Final; DDT; Judgement 2022: DDT 25th Anniversary | Next → NOAH; Destination 2022; DDT; Wrestle Peter Pan 2022 |

CyberFight Festival chronology
| ← Previous; 2021 | Next → — |

CyberFight Festival 2022 was a professional wrestling event promoted by CyberFight for its four brands, DDT Pro-Wrestling (DDT), Pro Wrestling Noah (Noah), Tokyo Joshi Pro Wrestling (TJPW), and Ganbare☆Pro-Wrestling (GanPro). It took place on June 12, 2022, in Saitama, Japan, at the Saitama Super Arena and aired live on CyberFight's streaming service Wrestle Universe where it featured English commentary.

The card will feature fourteen matches, with the first three being part of the Starting Battle pre-show.

It will be the second CyberFight promoted event under this name.

== Production ==
=== Background ===
On September 1, 2017, the Japanese digital advertising company CyberAgent acquired 100% of DDT Pro-Wrestling's (DDT) shares, including its sub-brands Tokyo Joshi Pro Wrestling (TJPW) and Ganbare☆Pro-Wrestling (GanPro). On January 28, 2020, following months of negotiation, LIDET Entertainment sold its shares of Pro Wrestling Noah (Noah) to CyberAgent. On July 27, it was announced that Noah and DDT, along with TJPW and GanPro, would merge in a new promotion called CyberFight, which would oversee and promote the four individual promotions. The decision came after financial troubles faced by Noah and DDT due to the COVID-19 pandemic. On February 25, 2021, CyberFight president Sanshiro Takagi, CyberFight's executive vice-presidents Akito and Naomichi Marufuji, GanPro representative Ken Ohka, and TJPW representative Tetsuya Koda held a press conference, announcing that the four brands would be working together to promote an event on June 6 at the Saitama Super Arena. The following year, on January 11, it was announced a new CyberFight Festival would be held at the Saitama Super Arena on June 12, 2022.

=== Storylines ===
CyberFight Festival 2022 will feature professional wrestling matches that result from scripted storylines, where wrestlers portray villains, heroes, or less distinguishable characters in the scripted events that build tension and culminate in a wrestling match or series of matches.

On April 27, 2022, Kazuyuki Fujita had to vacate the GHC Heavyweight Championship after having tested positive for COVID-19. On April 30, at Majestic 2022, Go Shiozaki defeated Kaito Kiyomiya for the vacant title, and New Japan Pro-Wrestling's Satoshi Kojima was revealed as Naomichi Marufuji's mystery partner in their tag team match against Yoshiki Inamura and Kinya Okada. Hours after the event had concluded, it was announced that Kojima would challenge Shiozaki for the GHC Heavyweight title at CyberFight Festival.

== Results ==
| No. | Results | Stipulations | Times |
|---|---|---|---|
| 1^{P} | Muscle Sakai and Yukio Naya defeated Soma Takao and Kazuki Hirata by pinfall | Tag team match | 9:02 |
| 2^{P} | Nao Kakuta, Mahiro Kiryu, Moka Miyamoto, Arisu Endo and Kaya Toribami defeated Hyper Misao, Yuki Aino, Yuuri, Pom Harajuku and Haruna Neko by pinfall | Ten-woman tag team match | 9:10 |
| 3^{P} | Eruption (Yukio Sakaguchi, Saki Akai and Hideki Okatani) defeated Ken Ohka, Yuna Manase and Mizuki Watase by technical knockout | Six-person tag team match | 10:20 |
| 4 | Kinya Okada and Kai Fujimura defeated Toui Kojima and Yuya Koroku by submission | Tag team match | 11:45 |
| 5 | 12100000 (Miyu Yamashita and Maki Itoh) and Juria Nagano defeated Hikari Noa, Suzume and Yuki Arai by pinfall | Six-woman tag team match | 10:54 |
| 6 | Pheromones (Yuki "Sexy" Iino, Yumehito "Fantastic" Imanari, Danshoku "Dandy" Dino and Akito "Co-Chin" Nishigaki) defeated Shinya Aoki, Sanshiro Takagi, Yumiko Hotta and Kendo Kashin by submission | Eight-person tag team match | 13:21 |
| 7 | Rika Tatsumi defeated Mizuki, Yuki Kamifuku and Miu Watanabe by pinfall | Four-way match for a Princess of Princess Championship match | 9:37 |
| 8 | Sugiura-gun International (El Hijo de Dr. Wagner Jr., René Duprée & Timothy Thatcher) and Michael Elgin and Simon Gotch defeated Sugiura-gun (Takashi Sugiura & Kazuyuki Fujita), Masa Kitamiya, Daiki Inaba and Shuhei Taniguchi by pinfall | Ten-man tag team match | 14:01 |
| 9 | Disaster Box (Harashima and Naomi Yoshimura) and CDK (Masahiro Takanashi and Chris Brookes) defeated The37Kamiina (Shunma Katsumata, Yuki Ueno and Mao) and Asuka by pinfall | Eight-person tag team match | 14:29 |
| 10 | Rob Van Dam and Stinger (Yoshinari Ogawa and Hayata) defeated Kaito Kiyomiya, Daisuke Harada and Yo-Hey by pinfall | Six-man tag team match | 12:03 |
| 11 | Katsuhiko Nakajima, Atsushi Kotoge and Yoshiki Inamura defeated Burning (Tetsuya Endo and Jun Akiyama) and Kazusada Higuchi by referee stoppage | Six-man tag team match | 6:20 |
| 12 | Kenoh defeated Daisuke Sasaki by pinfall | No disqualification match | 21:28 |
| 13 | Shoko Nakajima (c) defeated Yuka Sakazaki by pinfall | Singles match for the Princess of Princess Championship | 14:57 |
| 14 | Satoshi Kojima defeated Go Shiozaki (c) by pinfall | Singles match for the GHC Heavyweight Championship | 21:11 |
(c) / – the champion(s) heading into the match; P / – the match was broadcast on the pre-show
