= Wrestle Princess I =

2020 Tokyo Joshi Pro-Wrestling event

Wrestle Princess
- Promotional poster featuring various competitors
- Promotion: CyberFight
- Brand: Tokyo Joshi Pro-Wrestling
- Date: November 7, 2020
- City: Tokyo, Japan
- Venue: Tokyo Dome City Hall
- Attendance: Undisclosed (Note: The attendance was reduced due to the COVID-19 restrictions.)
- Tagline: "Tokyo Joshi Pro-Wrestling biggest show in history Wrestle Princess" (Note: Japanese: 東京女子プロレス史上最大のビッグショーWRESTLE PRINCESS, Hepburn: Tōkyō Joshi Puroresu shijō saidai no biggushō WRESTLE PRINCESS)

Pay-per-view chronology
← Previous; TJPW Live With Your Time	Next → TJPW Starting Point

Wrestle Princess chronology
← Previous; First	Next → II

Wrestle Princess (sequentially known as Wrestle Princess I) was a professional wrestling event promoted by CyberFight's sub-brand Tokyo Joshi Pro-Wrestling. It took place on November 7, 2020, in Tokyo, Japan, at the Tokyo Dome City Hall with limited attendance due in part to the ongoing COVID-19 pandemic at the time. The event aired on CyberAgent's AbemaTV online linear television service and CyberFight's streaming service Wrestle Universe.

It was the first annual event under the "Wrestle Princess" branch, which is considered to be Tokyo Joshi Pro-Wrestling's yearly main pay-per-view.

== Background ==
=== Storylines ===
The event featured ten professional wrestling matches that resulted from scripted storylines, where wrestlers portrayed villains, heroes, or less distinguishable characters in the scripted events that built tension and culminated in a wrestling match or series of matches.

=== Event ===
The event started with the confrontation between Mei Suruga and Moka Miyamoto, and Sena Shiori and Suzume, solded with the victory of the latter team. In the second bout, Mahiro Kiryu and Pom Harajuku picked up a victory over Haruna Neko and Marika Kobashi in tag team action. On October 7, 2020, Thunder Rosa was forced to relinquish the International Princess Championship as she was unable to travel to Japan due to COVID-19 restrictions. The following day, TJPW announced a tournament to crown the new champion, with the semifinals and finals of the tournament culminating at Wrestle Princess. Later that month, on October 10 and 17, Hikari Noa, Mirai Maiumi, Yuki Kamifuku, and Shoko Nakajima were the participants that reached the semifinals of the tournament.. In the first semifinal, Hikari Noa defeated Mirai Maiumi. In the second one, Yuki Kamifuku defeated Shoko Nakajima. In the sixth bout of the evening, Saki Akai defeated Hyper Misao in what was billed as a switching random rules match. Next up, Aja Kong and Miyu Yamashita defeated Maki Itoh and Sareee in tag team action. In the eighth bout, Yuki Kamifuku defeated Hikari Noa in the International Princess Championship tournament finals to win the vacant title. In the semi main event, Nodoka Tenma and Yuki Aino defeated Miu Watanabe and Rika Tatsumi to win the Princess Tag Team Championship, ending the latter team's reign at 370 days and four successful defenses.

In the main event, Yuka Sakazaki defeated Mizuki to retain the Princess of Princess Championship for the fourth successful time in that respective reign.

== Results ==
No.	Results	Stipulations	Times
1	Sena Shiori and Suzume defeated Mei Suruga and Moka Miyamoto	Tag team match	12:09
2	Mahiro Kiryu and Pom Harajuku defeated Haruna Neko and Marika Kobashi	Tag team match	9:01
3	Hikari Noa defeated Mirai Maiumi	International Princess Championship tournament semifinal	9:44
4	Yuki Kamifuku defeated Shoko Nakajima	International Princess Championship tournament semifinal	9:22
5	Yuna Manase defeated Raku	Singles match	9:17
6	Saki Akai defeated Hyper Misao	Switching random rules match	13:49
7	Aja Kong and Miyu Yamashita defeated Maki Itoh and Sareee	Tag team match	17:01
8	Yuki Kamifuku defeated Hikari Noa	International Princess Championship tournament finals	7:56
9	Bakuretsu Sisters (Nodoka Tenma and Yuki Aino) defeated Hakuchuumu (Miu Watanabe and Rika Tatsumi) (c)	Tag team match for the Princess Tag Team Championship	17:01
10	Yuka Sakazaki (c) defeated Mizuki	Singles match for the Princess of Princess Championship	25:37
(c) / – the champion(s) heading into the match
