= Wrestle Princess =

- Promotions: CyberFight
- Brands: Tokyo Joshi Pro-Wrestling
- First event: Wrestle Princess I

Wrestle Princess is an annual Japanese professional wrestling event promoted by CyberFight for its Tokyo Joshi Pro-Wrestling (TJPW) brand. The event has been held since 2020 and aired domestically on CyberAgent's AbemaTV online linear television service and CyberFight's streaming service Wrestle Universe. The event is usually held in autumn and is TJPW's biggest event of the year.

== Events ==
| # | Event | Date | City | Venue | Main event | Ref(s) |
|---|---|---|---|---|---|---|
| 1 | Wrestle Princess I | November 7, 2020 | Tokyo, Japan | Tokyo Dome City Hall | Yuka Sakazaki (c) vs. Mizuki for the Princess of Princess Championship | |
| 2 | Wrestle Princess II | October 9, 2021 | Tokyo, Japan | Ota City General Gymnasium | Miyu Yamashita (c) vs. Maki Itoh for the Princess of Princess Championship | |
| 3 | Wrestle Princess III | October 9, 2022 | Tokyo, Japan | Tokyo Dome City Hall | Shoko Nakajima (c) vs. Yuka Sakazaki for the Princess of Princess Championship | |
| 4 | Wrestle Princess IV | October 9, 2023 | Tokyo, Japan | Tama Mirai Messe | Mizuki (c) vs. Miyu Yamashita for the Princess of Princess Championship | |
| 5 | Wrestle Princess V | September 22, 2024 | Chiba, Japan | Makuhari Messe | Miu Watanabe (c) vs. Ryo Mizunami for the Princess of Princess Championship | |
| 6 | Wrestle Princess VI | September 20, 2025 | Tokyo, Japan | Ota City General Gymnasium | Mizuki (c) vs. Miu Watanabe for the Princess of Princess Championship | |
| 7 | Wrestle Princess VII | October 3, 2026 | Tokyo, Japan | Ota City General Gymnasium | Yuki Arai (c) vs. Suzume for the Princess of Princess Championship | |
(c) – refers to the champion(s) heading into the match
