= Suzume (wrestler) =

Japanese professional wrestler (born 1998)

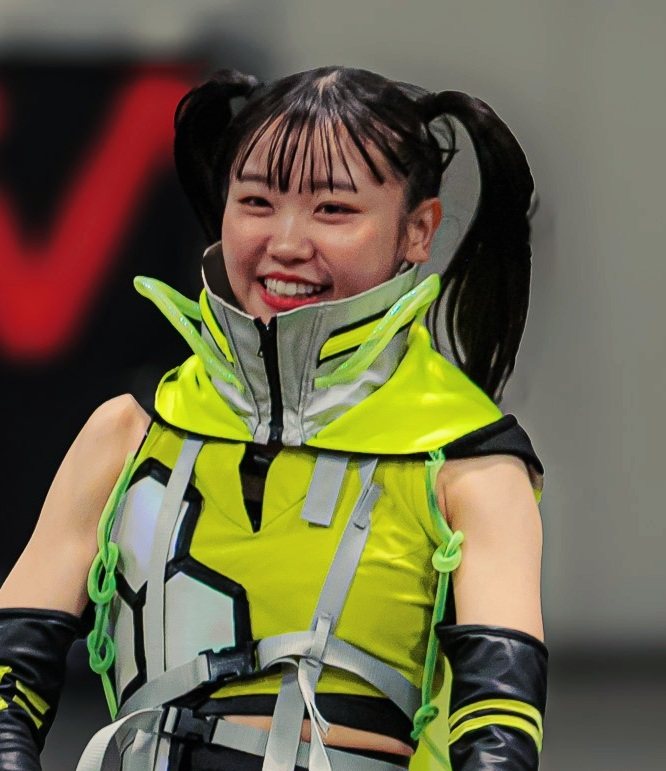
- Suzume in March 2026

Personal information
- Born: November 27, 1998 (age 27) Ibaraki, Japan

Professional wrestling career
- Ring names: Izumi; Suzume
- Billed height: 152 cm (5 ft 0 in)
- Debut: 2019

Suzume (鈴芽, Suzume) is a Japanese professional wrestler competing in Tokyo Joshi Pro-Wrestling (TJPW), where she is the current International Princess Champion in her second reign.

== Professional wrestling career ==
=== Tokyo Joshi Pro-Wrestling (2019–present) ===
Suzume made her professional wrestling debut in Tokyo Joshi Pro-Wrestling at TJPW Fan Club Show - Pure Tokyo Joshi Pro Wrestling 3 under the ring name of "Izumi" on August 12, 2019, where she wrestled Mirai Maiumi to a time-limit draw. Suzume competed for various titles promoted by TJPW. At TJPW Yes! Wonderland 2023 on May 5, she unsuccessfully challenged Rika Tatsumi for the International Princess Championship. At Grand Princess '24 on March 31, 2024, she teamed up with Arisu Endo and defeated Ryo Mizunami and Yuki Aino to win the Princess Tag Team Championship. At Tokyo Joshi Pro '25 on January 4, 2025, Suzume defeated Yuki Arai to win the International Princess Championship.

During her time with the promotion, Suzume competed in the two signature tournaments promoted by TJPW. As for the Tokyo Princess Cup, she made her first appearance at the 2020 edition, where she defeated Haruna Neko in the first round and fell short to Mizuki in the second round. One year later at the 2021 edition, she took a head start as she defeated Mahiro Kiryu in the second rounds, only to fall short to Maki Itoh in the quarterfinals. At the 2022 edition, she scored her best result to date when she defeated Pom Harajuku in the second rounds, Rika Tatsumi in the quarterfinals but fell short to Yuka Sakazaki in the semifinals. At the 2023 edition, Suzume fell short to Shoko Nakajima in the first rounds.

Suzume won the 2024 edition of the Futari wa Princess tournament by teaming up with her "Daisy Monkey" tag team partner, Arisu Endo, as they defeated Miu Watanabe and Rika Tatsumi in the finals.

Suzume also competed at Wrestle Princess, the biggest annual event promoted by TJPW. She made her first appearance at the very first event of 2020, where she teamed up with Sena Shiori to defeat Mei Suruga and Moka Miyamoto. At Wrestle Princess II on October 9, 2021, she teamed up with Arisu Endo in a losing effort against Riho and Shoko Nakajima. At Wrestle Princess III on October 9, 2022, she fell short to Ryo Mizunami in singles competition. At the fourth edition of the event from October 9, 2023, she teamed up with Antonio Honda, Pom Harajuku, Shoko Nakajima in a losing effort against Neo Biishiki-gun (Martha, Mei Saint-Michel, Sakisama and Yukio Saint Laurent).

=== Japanese independent circuit (2019–present) ===
Suzume often competes in the CyberFight branded sister promotions Pro Wrestling Noah and DDT Pro-Wrestling as developmental talent sent by TJPW.

==== Pro Wrestling Noah (2021–2022) ====
Suzume participated in the CyberFight Festival, a cross-over event promoted by TJPW, Noah, and DDT. She made her first appearance at the 2021 edition of the event where she teamed up with former "BeeStar" tag team partner Mirai Maiumi, Haruka Neko and Moka Miyamoto and Arisu Endo to defeat Nao Kakuta, Raku, Pom Harajuku, Mahiro Kiryu and Kaya Toribami in a Ten-woman tag team match. At CyberFight Festival 2022 she teamed up with Hikari Noa and Yuki Arai in a losing effort against 12100000 (Miyu Yamashita and Maki Itoh) and Juria Nagano.

==== DDT Pro-Wrestling (2019 present) ====
Suzume made her first appearance in a DDT Pro-Wrestling event at Ultimate Party 2019 on November 3, where she teamed up with Hikari Noa, Yumi and Mahiro Kiryu to defeat Raku, Pom Harajuku, Haruna Neko and Mirai Maiumi. She returned to the 2023 edition of the event where she teamed up with Arisu Endo and Wakana Uehara in a losing effort against Yuki Arai, Moka Miyamoto and Shin Suzuki.

At GCW Vs. TJPW, a cross-over event promoted by TJPW in partnership with Game Changer Wrestling on April 6, 2024, Suzume defeated Pom Harajuku and Saki in a three-way match.

== Personal life ==
Suzume cited Rika Tatsumi as her major inspiration for becoming a professional wrestler. She also stated that she designs her ring gear.

== Championships and accomplishments ==
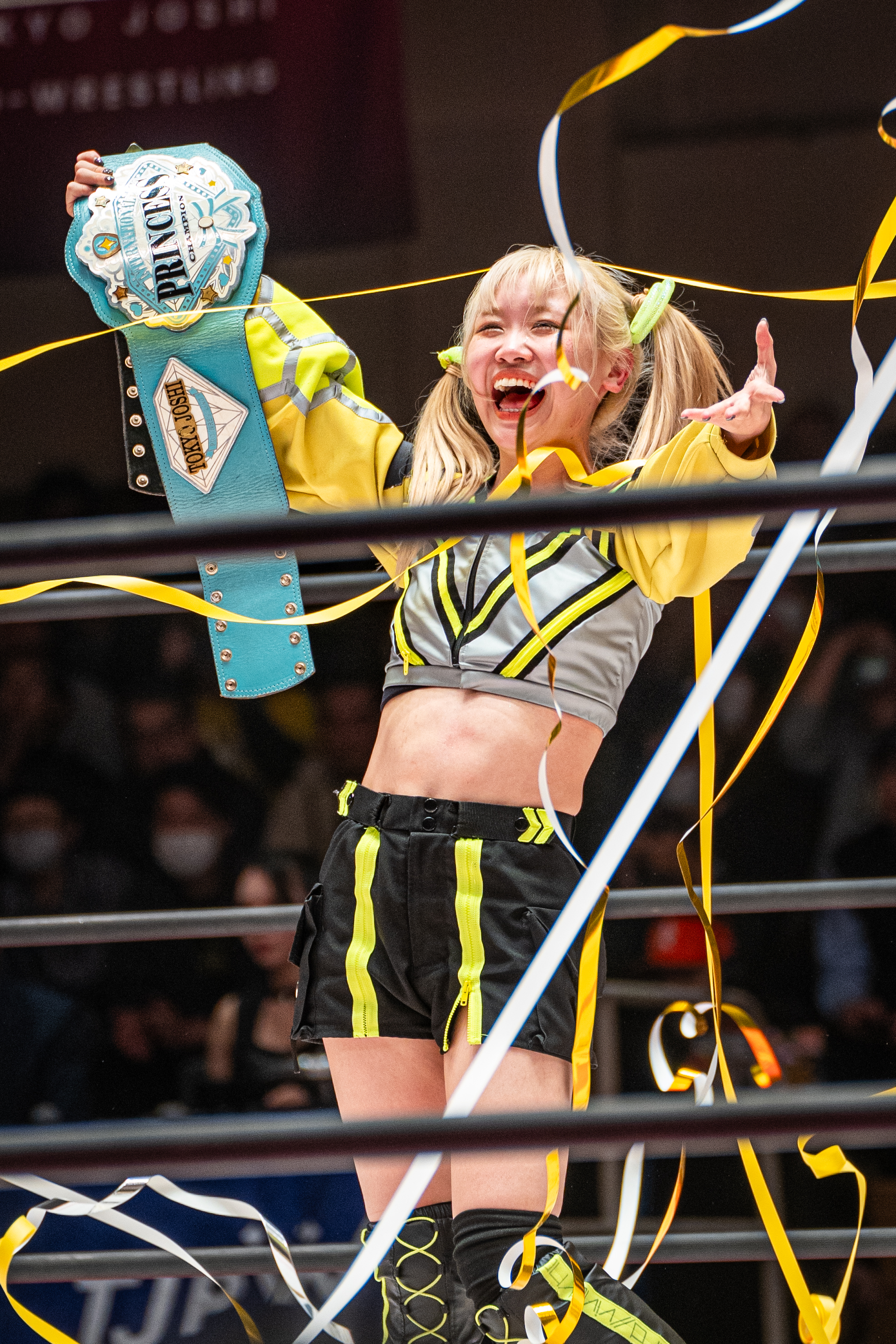
In TJPW, Suzume is a two-time International Princess Champion.

- DDT Pro-Wrestling
  - Ironman Heavymetalweight Championship (1 time)
- Pro Wrestling Illustrated
  - Ranked No. 55 of the top 250 female wrestlers in the PWI Women's 250 in 2025
- Tokyo Joshi Pro-Wrestling
  - International Princess Championship (2 times, current)
  - Princess Tag Team Championship (1 time) – with Arisu Endo
  - Futari Wa Princess Max Heart Tournament (2024) – with Arisu Endo
  - Tokyo Princess Cup (2026)
