= Ultimate Party 2019 =

2019 DDT Pro-Wrestling event

Ultimate Party 2019: DDT Group Big Gathering!
- Promotional poster featuring all the participants
- Promotion: DDT Pro-Wrestling
- Date: November 3, 2019
- City: Tokyo, Japan
- Venue: Ryōgoku Kokugikan
- Attendance: 5,869
- Tagline: With A Total of 81 Athletes - DDT Group Autumn Big Match

Pay-per-view chronology
← Previous; Peter Pan 2019	Next → Into The Fight 2020

Ultimate Party chronology
← Previous; First	Next → 2020

Ultimate Party 2019: DDT Group Big Gathering! (Ultimate Party 2019〜DDTグループ大集合！〜, Ultimate Party 2019: DDT gurūpu dai shūgō) was a professional wrestling event promoted by DDT Pro-Wrestling (DDT). The event took place on November 3, 2019, in Tokyo at the Ryōgoku Kokugikan. It was the first event under the Ultimate Party chronology. The event featured fourteen matches, nine of which were contested for championships. The event aired live on DDT's streaming service DDT Universe.

The main event saw DDT Extreme Champion Harashima defeat KO-D Openweight Champion Konosuke Takeshita in a Title vs. Title match. In other prominent matches, Yuka Sakazaki defeated Shoko Nakajima to win the Princess of Princess Championship, Masahiro Takanashi defeated Ryuichi Sekine to win the Union Max Championship, and Daydream (Rika Tatsumi and Miu Watanabe) defeated NEO Biishiki-gun (Sakisama and Misao) to win the Princess Tag Team Championship.

== Storylines ==
The Ultimate Party 2019 event featured fourteen professional wrestling matches that involved different wrestlers from pre-existing scripted feuds and storylines. Wrestlers portrayed villains, heroes, or less distinguishable characters in the scripted events that built tension and culminated in a wrestling match or series of matches.

== Event ==
There have been three pre-show matches. During the last one, two folding chairs fell on Shota, who was the 1,432nd Ironman Heavymetalweight Champion. Referee Yukinori Matsui counted this as a pinfall and awarded the title to the chair that was "pinning" Shota. He then counted a second pinfall as the second chair was lying on the first thus "pinning" it. As a result, the second chair was added to the participants of the Rumble rules match as the 1,434th defending champion. The main card had eleven matches, with the main event portraiting the winner-takes-all confrontation between the DDT Extreme Champion Harashima and the KO-D Openweight Champion Konosuke Takeshita. Harashima succeeded in defending his title and won the Openweight title for the tenth time in his career.

== Results ==
No.	Results	Stipulations	Times
1^{P}	Daichi Kazato, Masato Kamino and Shuhei Washida defeated Tomomitsu Matsunaga, Mizuki Watase and Keigo Nakamura	Six-man tag team match	06:58
2^{P}	Hikari Noa, Yumi, Mahiro Kiryu and Suzume defeated Raku, Pom Harajuku, Haruna Neko and Mirai Maiumi	Eight-woman tag team match	08:22
3^{P}	Kazuki Hirata won by last eliminating Gorgeous Matsuno	Rumble rules match for the Ironman Heavymetalweight Championship	15:20
4	Isami Kodaka defeated Sanshiro Takagi	100 Plastic Cases match	05:49
5	Danshoku Dino, Asuka, Yuki Iino, Mizuki and Trans-Am★Hiroshi defeated Super Sasadango Machine, Yuna Manase, Jiro "Ikemen" Kuroshio, Hiroshi Yamato and Makoto Oishi	Ten-person tag team match for the vacant KO-D 10-Man Tag Team Championship	13:43
6	Nautilus (Yuki Ueno and Naomi Yoshimura) defeated Yukio Naya and Cody Hall, Yukio Sakaguchi and Ryota Nakatsu, Shuichiro Katsumura and Kouki Iwasaki, NEO Itoh Respect Army (Maki Itoh and Chris Brookes) and Bakuretsu Sisters (Nodoka Tenma and Yuki Aino)	Gauntlet tag team match	15:47
7	Keisuke Ishii (c) defeated Fuminori Abe	Singles match for the Independent World Junior Heavyweight Championship	07:26
8	Takumi Tsukamoto, Yasu Urano and Takato Nakano (c) defeated Damnation (Tetsuya Endo, Mad Paulie and Nobuhiro Shimatani) and Ken Ohka, Yumehito Imanari and Miss Mongol	Three-way match for the UWA World Trios Championship	09:09
9	Daydream (Rika Tatsumi and Miu Watanabe) defeated NEO Biishiki-gun (Sakisama and Misao) (c)	Tag team match for the Princess Tag Team Championship	13:46
10	Damnation (Daisuke Sasaki and Soma Takao) (c) defeated All Out (Akito and Shunma Katsumata), Iron Priest (Fuma and Yusuke Kubo) and Sento Minzoku (Minoru Fujita and Daiki Shimomura) by submission	Four-way hardcore match for the KO-D Tag Team Championship	13:24
11	Masahiro Takanashi defeated Ryuichi Sekine (c)	Singles match for the Union Max Championship	09:59
12	Yuka Sakazaki defeated Shoko Nakajima (c)	Singles match for the Princess of Princess Championship	14:12
13	Kenny Omega and Riho defeated Antonio Honda and Miyu Yamashita	Tag team match	21:22
14	Harashima (Extreme) defeated Konosuke Takeshita (KO-D)	Title vs. Title match for the KO-D Openweight Championship and the DDT Extreme Division Championship	25:38
(c) / – the champion(s) heading into the match; P / – the match was broadcast on the pre-show

=== Rumble rules match ===
Order	Wrestler	Order eliminated	By	Time
1	Chair	3	Yuki Kamifuku (Note: Kamifuku becomes the 1,435th champion.)	5:51
2	Kazuki Hirata	—	—	Winner
3	Yoshihiko	2	Shota	4:41
4	Pokotan	1	Shota and Kazuki Hirata	4:57
5	Shota	9	Gorgeous Matsuno and Kazuki Hirata	14:21
6	Yuki Kamifuku	4	Sagat (Note: Sagat becomes the 1,436th champion.)	8:55
7	Mina Shirakawa	6	Toru Owashi	13:56
8	Harukaze	7	Shota	13:57
9	Sagat	5	Gorgeous Matsuno (Note: Matsuno becomes the 1,437th champion.)	13:29
10	Toru Owashi	8	Gorgeous Matsuno and Kazuki Hirata	14:21
11	Gorgeous Matsuno	10	Kazuki Hirata (Note: Hirata becomes the 1,438th champion.)	15:20

=== Gauntlet tag team match ===
Elimination	Wrestler	Team	Eliminated by	Elimination move	Time	Ref.
1	Kouki Iwasaki	Shuichiro Katsumura and Kouki Iwasaki	Yukio Sakaguchi	Pinned after a God's Right Knee	3:55	
2	Yukio Sakaguchi	Yukio Sakaguchi and Ryota Nakatsu	Yuki Aino	Over the top rope	1:52	
3	Yuki Aino	Bakuretsu Sisters	Maki Itoh	Pinned after a Flying Big Head	2:56	
4	Maki Itoh	NEO Itoh Respect Army	Yuki Ueno	Pinned with a crucifix	2:35	
5	Yukio Naya	Yukio Naya and Cody Hall	Naomi Yoshimura	Pinned after a lariat	4:29	
Winners:	Nautilus (Yuki Ueno and Naomi Yoshimura)					
