= Tokyo Joshi Pro '16 =

Professional wrestling event

- Promotional poster featuring various TJPW wrestlers
- Promotion: Tokyo Joshi Pro-Wrestling
- Date: January 4, 2016
- City: Tokyo, Japan
- Venue: Korakuen Hall
- Attendance: 914

Pay-per-view chronology
← Previous; Turn the Next Corner	Next → Battle Mission 2016 Code.1

Tokyo Joshi Pro chronology
← Previous; First	Next → 2017

Tokyo Joshi Pro '16 (東京女子プロレス'16, Tōkyō joshi puroresu' 16) was the inaugural professional wrestling event produced by Tokyo Joshi Pro-Wrestling (TJPW). It took place on January 4, 2016, at the Korakuen Hall in Tokyo, Japan.

In the event, TJPW crowned their first Tokyo Princess of Princess Champion where Miyu Yamashita defeated Shoko Nakajima in the main event.

== Production ==
=== Background ===
On January 3, 2016, TJPW revealed the Tokyo Princess of Princess Championship, TJPW's first title, which would be battled between Miyu Yamashita and Shoko Nakajima.

== Results ==
No.	Results	Stipulations	Times
1	Yuu defeated Nodoka-Oneesan by submission	Singles match	4:13
2	Nonoko defeated Hyper Misao and Mizuho by pinfall	Three-way match	9:45
3	Marika Kobashi and Rika Tatsumi defeated Azusa Takigawa and Erin by pinfall	Tag team match	11:14
4	Candice LeRae defeated Yuka Sakazaki by pinfall	Singles match	11:14
5	Ai Shimizu defeated Kanna by pinfall	Singles match	6:58
6	Poison Miura (with Poison Sawada Julie) defeated Saki Akamiya by pinfall	Singles match	10:48
7	Miyu Yamashita defeated Shoko Nakajima by pinfall	Singles match for the inaugural Tokyo Princess of Princess Championship	19:17
