= Yuki Aino =

Japanese professional wrestler

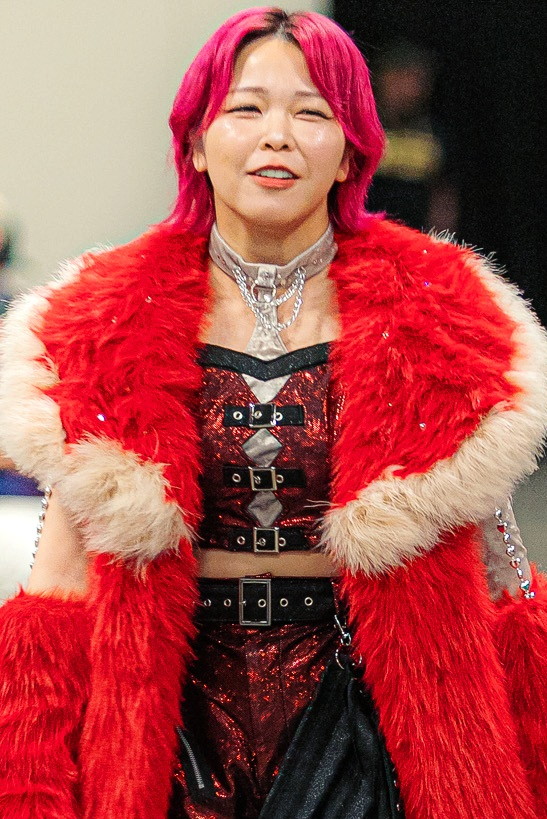
- Aino in March 2026

Personal information
- Born: October 25, 1994 (age 31) Tsuyama, Okayama, Japan
- Relatives: Nodoka Tenma (sister); Ryuichi Sekine (brother-in-law)

Professional wrestling career
- Ring name: Yuki Aino
- Billed height: 153 cm (5 ft 0 in)
- Debut: 2018

Yuki Aino (愛野ユキ, Aino Yuki; born October 25, 1994) is a Japanese professional wrestler and former ring announcer. She is signed to the Japanese promotion Tokyo Joshi Pro-Wrestling, where she is one-half of the current Princess Tag Team Champions with Hazu Kazashiro in their first reign as a team but third for Aino individually.

== Professional wrestling career ==
=== Tokyo Joshi Pro-Wrestling (2018–present) ===
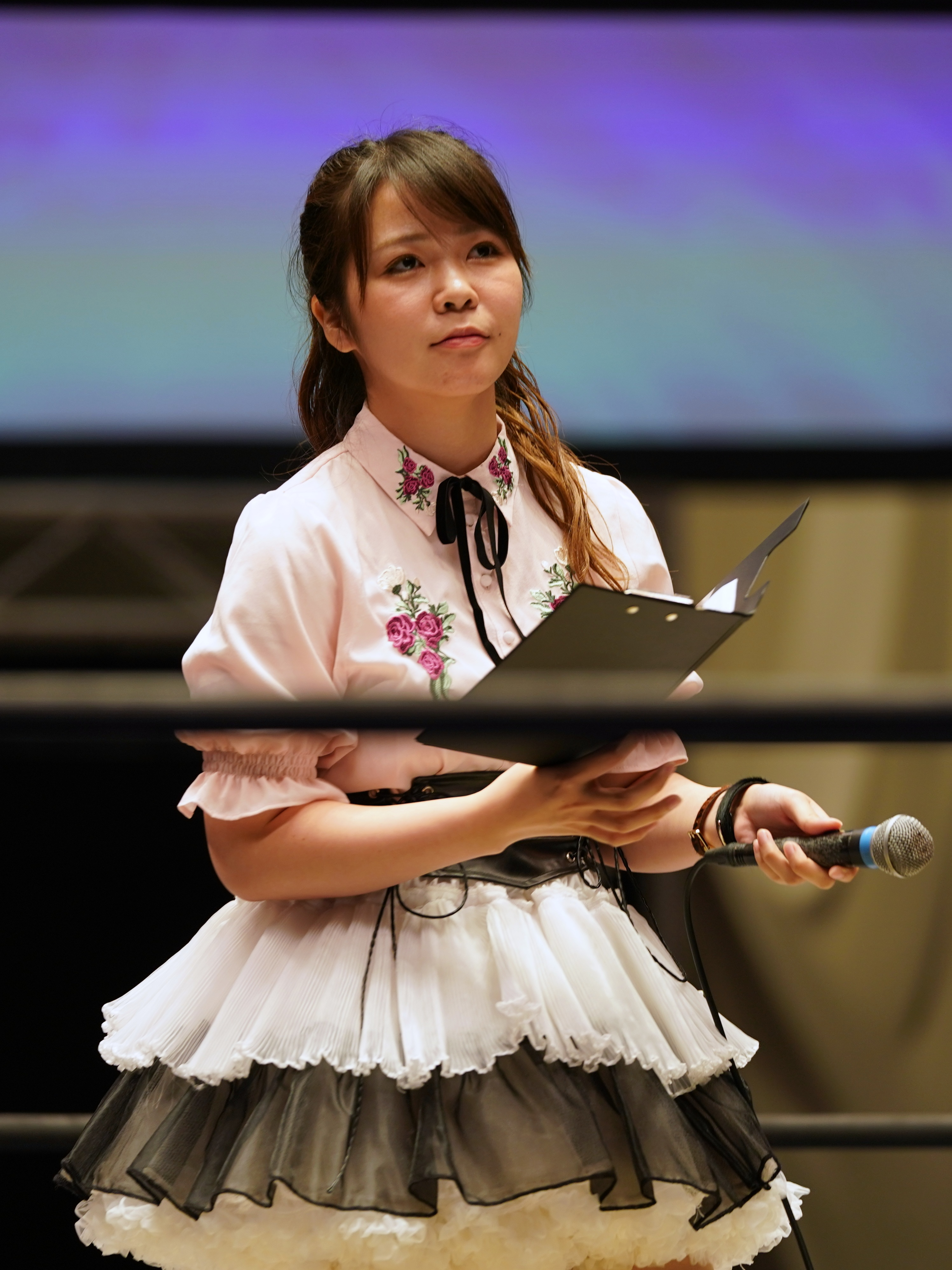
Aino in August 2017 during her ring announcing period.

After her time as a ring announcer, Aino made her professional wrestling debut in Tokyo Joshi Pro-Wrestling at TJPW Yes! Wonderland ~ Break Myself! ~ on May 3, 2018, where she teamed up with her "Bakuretsu Sisters" tag team partner and real-life sister Nodoka Tenma in a losing effort against Hikari Noa and Yuu as a result of a tag team match. At TJPW 5th Anniversary on November 4, 2018, she competed in a gauntlet battle royal for both the Ironman Heavymetalweight Championship and the number one contendership for the Princess of Princess Championship won by Maki Itoh and also involving Yuki Kamifuku, Reika Saiki and others. Aino made it to the finals of the "Tokyo Princess Cup 2021" where she fell short to Miu Watanabe. At Wrestle Princess I on November 7, 2020, Aino and Nodoka Tenma succeeded in winning the Princess Tag Team Championship from Hakuchuumu (Miu Watanabe and Rika Tatsumi). One year later at Wrestle Princess II on October 9, 2021, Aino unsuccessfully challenged Hikari Noa for the International Princess Championship.

On April 29, 2023, at TJPW Precious Time, Aino, along with Pom Harajuku and Raku won the Shinagawa Three Woman Festival.

=== DDT Pro-Wrestling (2018–present) ===
Due to being a TJPW wrestler, Aino is known for competing in sister-promotion DDT Pro-Wrestling. She made appearances in several of the promotion's signature events such as the DDT Judgement, marking her first performance at Judgement 2019: DDT 22nd Anniversary on February 17, she teamed up with Nodoka Tenma and Yuna Manase to defeat Natsupoi, Hikari Noa and Miu Watanabe. Another branch of events in which Aino has worked is DDT Peter Pan, making her first appearance at Wrestle Peter Pan 2019 on July 15, where she teamed up with Nodoka Tenma and Rika Tatsumi to defeat Natsumi Maki, Yuna Manase and Himawari Unagi. On the second night of Wrestle Peter Pan 2020 from June 7, where she teamed up with Nodoka Tenma and Rika Tatsumi in a losing effort against MiraClians (Yuka Sakazaki and Shoko Nakajima) and Miyu Yamashita. As for the DDT Ultimate Party, Aino made her only appearance at the 2019 edition where she teamed up with Nodoka Tenma and unsuccessfully competed in a Gauntlet tag team match won by Nautilus (Yuki Ueno and Naomi Yoshimura) and also involving Yukio Naya and Cody Hall, Yukio Sakaguchi and Ryota Nakatsu, Shuichiro Katsumura and Kouki Iwasaki, and NEO Itoh Respect Army (Maki Itoh and Chris Brookes).

=== Pro Wrestling Noah (2021–present) ===
Due to TJPW being a promotion patroned by the CyberFight company, Aino competed in cross-over events held between the three promotions owned by it, those being TJPW, DDT and Pro Wrestling Noah. The first event of such kind was the CyberFight Festival 2021 from June 6, where she teamed up with Nodoka Tenma in a losing effort against Hyper Misao and Shoko Nakajima, and Hakuchumu (Miu Watanabe and Rika Tatsumi) in a three-way tag team match. At CyberFight Festival 2022 on June 12, she teamed up with Hyper Misao, Yuuri, Pom Harajuku and Haruna Neko in a losing effort against Nao Kakuta, Mahiro Kiryu, Moka Miyamoto, Arisu Endo and Kaya Toribami.

== Personal life ==
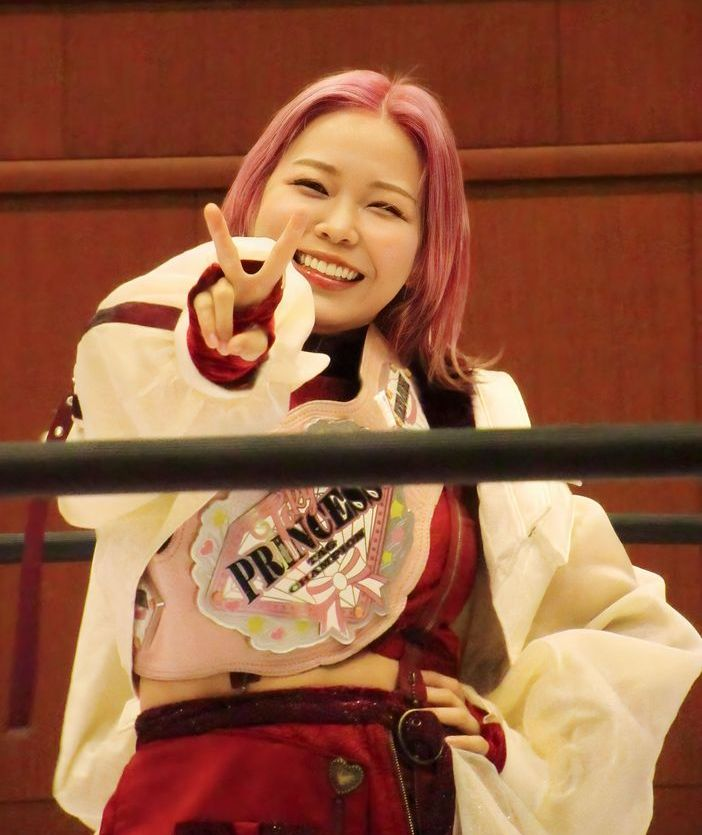
Aino as one half of the Princess Tag Team Champions in January 2024.

Aino is real life sisters with former "Bakuretsu Sisters" tag team partner Nodoka Tenma. She became sister-in-law with fellow professional wrestler Ryuichi Sekine after Tenma married him in late 2022.

== Championships and accomplishments ==
- Pro Wrestling Illustrated
  - Ranked No. 198 of the top 250 female wrestlers in the PWI Women's 250 in 2024
- Tokyo Joshi Pro Wrestling
  - Princess Tag Team Championship (3 times, current) – with Nodoka Tenma (1), Ryo Mizunami (1), Hazu Kazashiro (1, current)
  - Shinagawa Three Woman Festival (2023) – with Pom Harajuku and Raku
