= Miu Watanabe =

Japanese professional wrestler

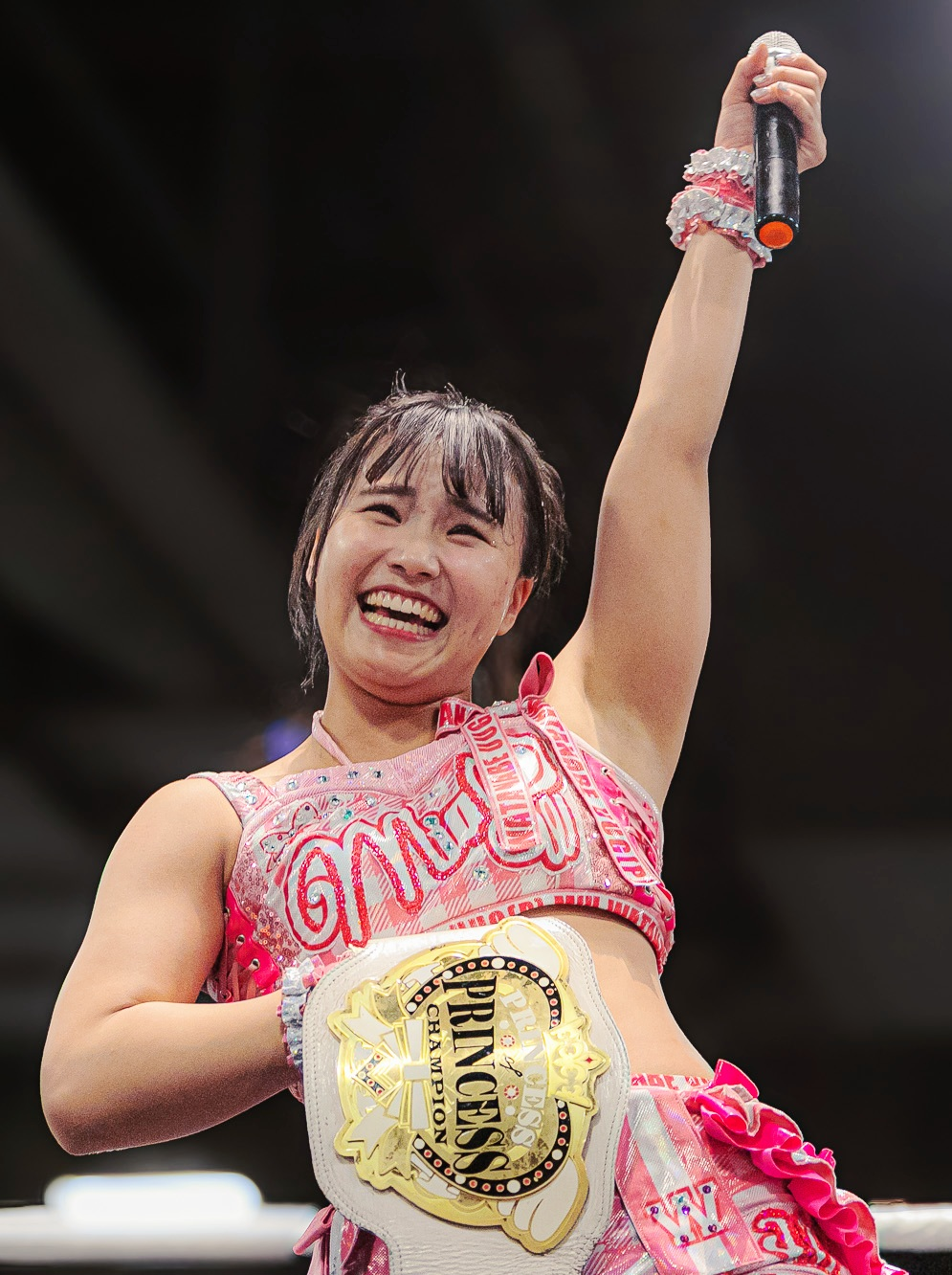
- Watanabe in March 2026

Personal information
- Born: October 19, 1999 (age 26) Saitama, Japan

Professional wrestling career
- Ring name(s): Miu Watanabe; Miu
- Billed height: 159 cm (5 ft 3 in)
- Trained by: Makoto Oishi
- Debut: 2018

Miu Watanabe (渡辺未詩, Watanabe Miu; born October 19, 1999) is a Japanese professional wrestler working for the Japanese promotion Tokyo Joshi Pro Wrestling (TJPW), where she is a former two-time Princess of Princess Champion.

== Professional wrestling career ==
=== Tokyo Joshi Pro Wrestling (2018–present) ===
Watanabe is best known for her time in Tokyo Joshi Pro Wrestling. She made her professional wrestling debut on January 4, 2018 at Tokyo Joshi Pro '18 where she teamed up with Pinano Pipipipi as the "Up Up Girls" to defeat stablemates Hikari Noa and Raku. Watanabe is known for being part of Up Up Girls Kakko Kari which is a popular idol group in Japan. Watanabe soon began pursuing for different championships. At 5th Anniversary Shinkiba Tour 2018 on November 4, she unsuccessfully participated in a 12-woman gauntlet battle royal for both the Princess of Princess Championship and the Ironman Heavymetalweight Championship won by Maki Itoh and also involving Shoko Nakajima, Reika Saiki, Yuki Kamifuku, Yuna Manase and others. On the same night, Watanabe teamed up with Hikari Noa and Miyu Yamashita to defeat Hinano, Mizuki and Yuka Sakazaki.

At Wrestle Princess III on October 9, 2022, Watanabe defeated Alex Windsor to win the International Princess Championship. She made her first title defense at The Mountain Top 2022 on October 29, defeating Moka Miyamoto in the main event. At Tokyo Joshi Pro '23 on January 4, 2023, Watanabe defeated Trish Adora to make her second successful title defense. At TJPW City Circuit Winter ~ Nagoya Performance on February 18, she defeated Janai Kai to make her third successful title defense. On March 18, at Grand Princess '23, Watanabe dropped the title to Rika Tatsumi, ending her reign at 160 days.

On March 31, 2024, at Grand Princess '24, Watanabe defeated Miyu Yamashita to win the Princess of Princess Championship for the first time. She made her first successful title defense against Shoko Nakajima at Yes! Wonderland '24 on May 6. On June 9, at TJPW Prism '24, she defeated VertVixen to make her second successful title defense. On July 20, at Summer Sun Princess '24, Watanabe defeated Rika Tatsumi to secure her third title defense. At Wrestle Princess V, on September 22, she defeated Ryo Mizunami to make her fourth title defense. On November 16, at The Mountain Top 2024, she faced Zara Zakher and successfully defended her title for the fifth time. On January 4, 2025, at Tokyo Joshi Pro '25, Watanabe dropped the title to Mizuki, ending her reign at 279 days.

On August 23, 2025, Watanabe won the Tokyo Princess Cup after defeating Arisu Endo in the finals. On September 20, at Wrestle Princess VI, Watanabe defeated Mizuki to win the Princess of Princess Championship for the second time. On October 18, at Additional Attack '25, she made her first successful title defense against Yuki Aino. On November 9, at All Rise '25, Watanabe defeated J-Rod to make her second successful title defense. On December 13, at TJPW Live in Bangkok, she defeated Matcha to secure her third title defense. On January 4, 2026, at Tokyo Joshi 'Pro 26, Watanabe faced Suzume and successfully defended her title for the fourth time. On March 29 at Grand Princess '26, Watanabe dropped the title to Yuki Arai, ending her second reign at 190 days. On May 4 at Yes! Wonderland '26, Watanabe reteamed with Rika Tatsumi to defeat The IInspiration (Cassie Lee and Jessie McKay) to win the Princess Tag Team Championship for the second time.

=== DDT Pro Wrestling (2018–present) ===
Due to TJPW being under the same CyberFight flagship, Watanabe has competed in various of DDT Pro Wrestling's events. She made her first appearance at DDT Tokyo Idol Festival 2018 on August 3, where she teamed up with her Up Up Girls stablemates Hikari Noa, Pinano Pipipipi, Raku, and Danshoku Dino to defeat Hyper Misao, Makoto Oishi, Yuki Kamifuku, Akari Saho, Aya Kajishima, Mayu Yoshikawa and Sanshiro Takagi. Watanabe also participated in some of DDT's signature events such as DDT Judgement, making her first appearance at the Judgement 2019: DDT 22nd Anniversary on February 17, where she teamed up with Hikari Noa and Natsumi Maki in a losing effort against Bakurestu Sisters (Nodoka Tenma, Yuki Aino) and Yuna Manase as a result of a six-woman tag team match. At DDT Street Pro Wrestling In Tokyo Idol Festival 2019 on August 2, Watanabe competed in another battle royal for the Ironman Heavymetalweight Championship won by Momomi Wagatsuma who dethroned the previous champion Yukio Sakaguchi. The match also involved other notable opponents such as Yukio Naya and other idols like Natsumi Misake and Rise Shiokawa. Another signature event in which Watanabe competed was the DDT Ultimate Party, making her first appearance at the Ultimate Party 2019 edition from November 3, where she teamed up with Rika Tatsumi as "Hakuchuumu" and defeated Neo Biishiki-gun (Misao and Sakisama) to win the Princess Tag Team Championship.

=== Pro Wrestling Noah (2021–Present) ===
At CyberFight Festival 2021, a cross over event promoted by all DDT, TJPW and Pro Wrestling Noah on June 6, 2021, Watanabe teamed up with Rika Tatsumi and unsuccessfully fought Shoko Nakajima and Hyper Misao, and Bakuretsu Sisters (Nodoka Tenma and Yuki Aino).

At CyberFight Festival 2022, She participated in the Princess of Princess Championship Next Challenger Decision 4-Way Match. She faced Rika Tatsumi, Mizuki, and Yuki Kamifuku, with Mizuki winning the match.

In Keiji Muto Grand Final Pro-Wrestling "Last-Love". This was Keiji Muto's retirement show, which was primarily a NOAH-promoted event (though featuring cross-promotional matches). Miu Watanabe competed in a TJPW-presented match on the card, known as the TJPW Spark 8-Man Tag Team Match. She was on the losing team of Mizuki, Maki Itoh, and Yuki Arai against Yuka Sakazaki, Miyu Yamashita, Shoko Nakajima, and Rika Tatsumi.

== Championships and accomplishments ==
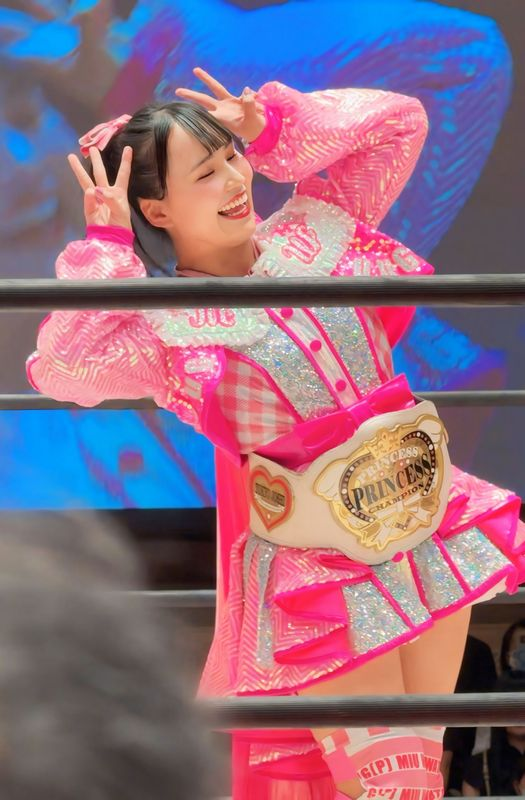
In TJPW, Watanabe is a two-time Princess of Princess Champion...

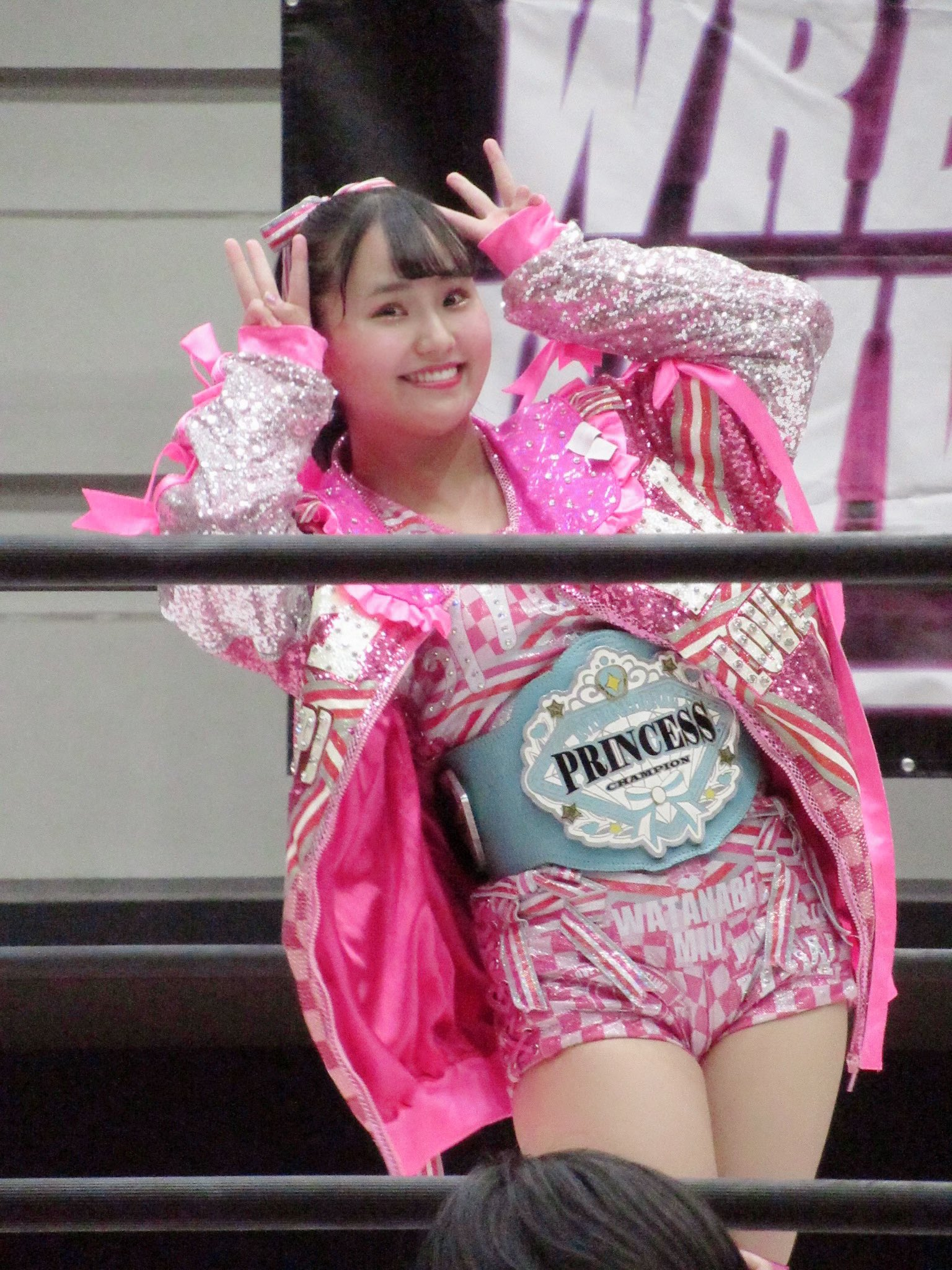
...and a one-time International Princess Champion.

- DDT Pro-Wrestling
  - Ironman Heavymetalweight Championship (1 time)
- Pro Wrestling Illustrated
  - Ranked No. 18 of the top 250 female wrestlers in the PWI Women's 250 in 2024
- Tokyo Joshi Pro Wrestling
  - International Princess Championship (1 time)
  - Princess of Princess Championship (2 times)
  - Princess Tag Team Championship (2 times) – with Rika Tatsumi
  - Second Grand Slam Champion
  - Tokyo Princess Cup (2025)
  - Futari No Princess Max Heart Tournament (2022) – with Rika Tatsumi
