= Yuki Kamifuku =

Japanese professional wrestler

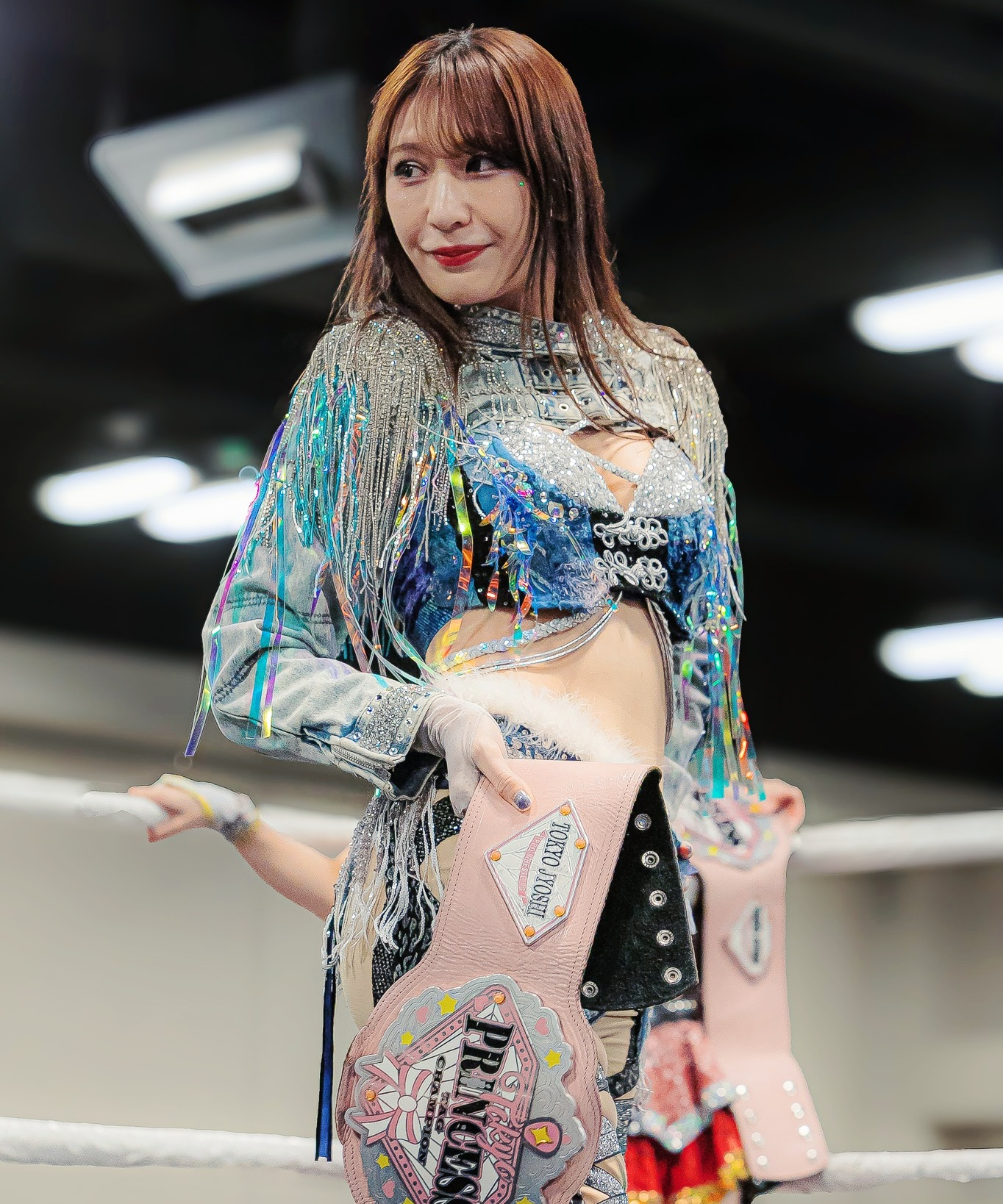
- Kamifuku in March 2026

Personal information
- Born: February 20, 1993 (age 33) Fujisawa, Kanagawa, Japan

Professional wrestling career
- Ring name(s): Kamiyu; Yuki Kamifuku
- Billed height: 173 cm (5 ft 8 in)
- Billed weight: 53 kg (117 lb)
- Debut: 2017

Yuki Kamifuku (上福佑季, Kamifuku Yuki; ring name: 上福ゆき) is a Japanese professional wrestler and model currently signed to Tokyo Joshi Pro-Wrestling,She became known for her tenures with DDT Pro-Wrestling and Pro Wrestling Noah.

== Early life ==
Yuki Kamifuku was born in Fujisawa, Kanagawa, on February 23, 1993. She and her family lived in the U.S. during her teenage years as her father found work in Ohio, and she became fluent in English before the family returned to Japan.

== Professional wrestling career ==
=== Tokyo Joshi Pro Wrestling (2017–present) ===
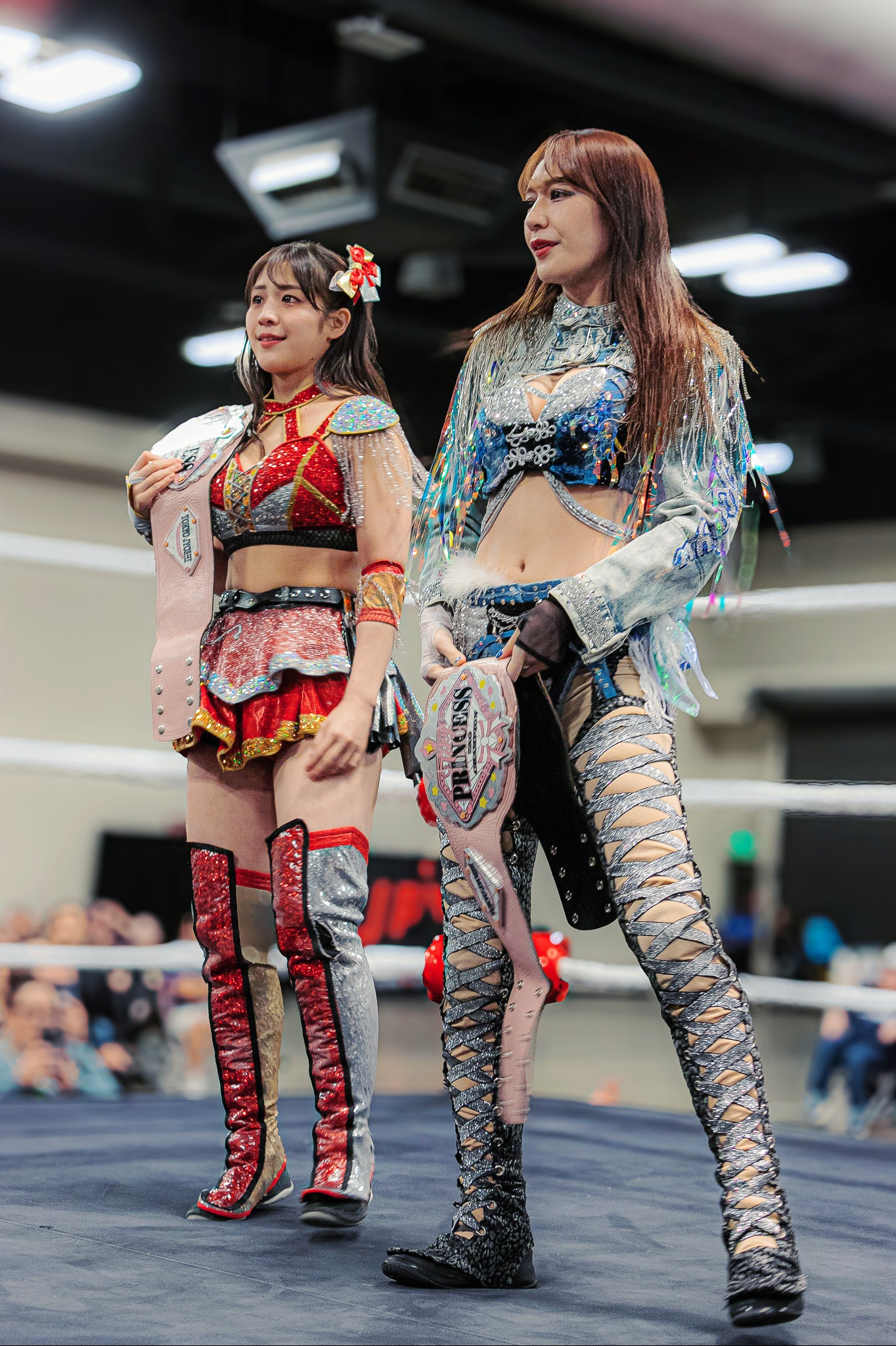
Kamifuku (right) as one half of the Princess Tag Team Champions alongside Wakana Uehara as "Ober Eats".

Kamifuku made her professional wrestling debut at TJPW Brand New Wrestling ~ The Beginning of a New Era, an event promoted by Tokyo Joshi Pro Wrestling on August 26, 2017, where she teamed up with Yuna Manase in a losing effort against Mizuki and Nonoko. On November 7, 2020, at Wrestle Princess I, Kamifuku won the vacant International Princess Championship by defeating Hikari Noa in the finals of an eight-woman single-elimination tournament. On January 4, 2021, at TJPW Tokyo Joshi Pro '21, she teamed up with Mahiro Kiryu to unsuccessfully challenge Bakuretsu Sisters (Nodoka Tenma and Yuki Aino) for the Princess Tag Team Championship.

At CyberFight Festival 2021, a multi-promotional event promoted by NOAH, DDT, TJPW and GanPro on June 6, Kamifuku teamed up with Maki Itoh and Marika Kobashi, picking up a victory against Hikari Noa, Yuki Arai and Mizuki.

On August 13, 2023, Kamifuku reached to the finals of the 10th annual Tokyo Princess Cup tournament, before losing to Miyu Yamashita.

=== DDT Pro-Wrestling (2017–present) ===
Kamifuku made her first appearance for DDT Pro-Wrestling at DDT Tokyo Game Show 2017 4Gamer on September 23, 2017, where she teamed up with Miyu Yamashita in a losing effort to Rika Tatsumi and Yuu.

She is known for working into various of the promotion's signature events. One of them is DDT Peter Pan, making her first appearance at Ryōgoku Peter Pan 2018 from October 21 where she teamed up with Mina Shirakawa and Miyu Yamashita in a losing effort against Yuka Sakazaki, Mizuki and Shoko Nakajima as a result of a six-woman tag team match. One year later at Wrestle Peter Pan 2019 on July 15, she participated in a Rumble rules match for the Ironman Heavymetalweight Championship won by Yukio Sakaguchi and also involving Hiroshi Yamato, Shiro Koshinaka, Joey Ryan, Gorgeous Matsuno and others.

Another branch of events she worked is the DDT Ultimate Party. At Ultimate Party 2019 on November 3, she competed in a Rumble rules match for the Ironman Heavymetalweight Championship won by Kazuki Hirata and also involving Toru Owashi, Harukaze, Sagat and others.

== Championships and accomplishments ==
- DDT Pro-Wrestling
  - Ironman Heavymetalweight Championship (1 time)
- Pro Wrestling Illustrated
  - Ranked No. 120 of the top 150 female wrestlers in the PWI Women's 150 in 2022
- Singapore Pro Wrestling
  - SPW Queen of Asia Championship (1 time)
- Tokyo Joshi Pro Wrestling
  - International Princess Championship (1 time)
  - Tokyo Princess Tag Team Championship (1 time) – with Wakana Uehara
  - International Princess Championship Tournament (2020)
  - Osaka Three Man Festival Tournament (2020) – with Mina Shirakawa and Yuna Manase
- Vietnam Pro Wrestling
  - VPW Women's Championship (1 time, inaugural)
