= Hikari Noa =

Japanese professional wrestler

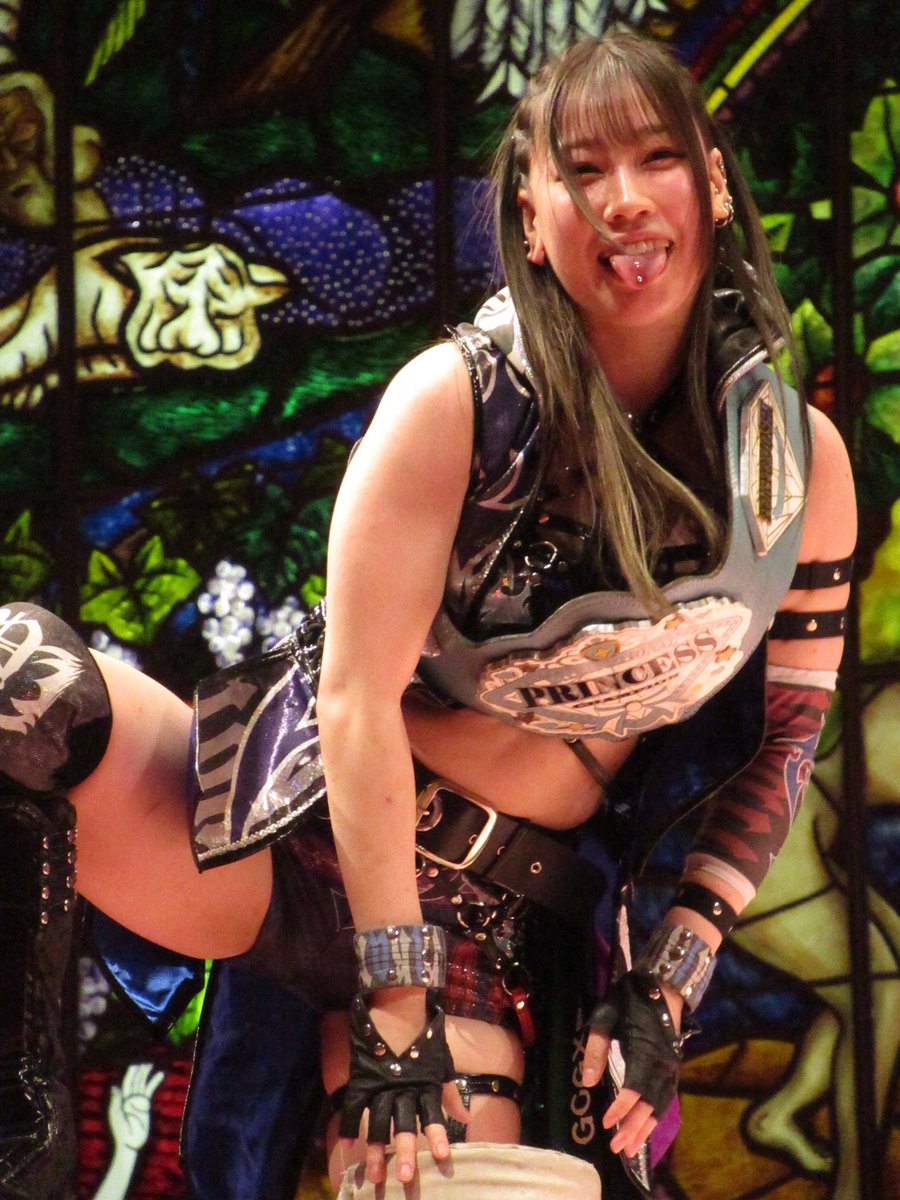
- Noa in November 2021

Personal information
- Born: February 18, 1998 (age 28) Hokkaido, Japan

Professional wrestling career
- Ring name(s): Hikari; Hikari Noa
- Billed height: 153 cm (5 ft 0 in)
- Trained by: Makoto Oishi
- Debut: 2018

Hikari Noa (乃蒼ヒカリ, Noa Hikari; born February 18, 1998), is a Japanese professional wrestler, known for her time in Japanese professional wrestling promotion Tokyo Joshi Pro Wrestling, where she was an International Princess Champion and a Princess Tag Team Champion.

== Professional wrestling career ==
=== Tokyo Joshi Pro Wrestling (2018–2024) ===
Noa made her professional wrestling debut at TJPW Tokyo Joshi Pro '18 , an event promoted by Tokyo Joshi Pro-Wrestling (TJPW) on January 4, 2018 where she teamed up with Raku as "Up Up Girls" in a losing effort against stablemates Pinano Pipipipi and Miu Watanabe in a tag team match. At TJPW 10 Vs. 10 - Red And White Winning Match on April 3, 2020, Noa competed in a twenty-woman tag team gauntlet match in which she teamed up with Haruka Neko, Mina Shirakawa, Mirai Maiumi, Miu Watanabe, Miyu Yamashita, Mizuki, Rika Tatsumi, Yuki Aino and Yuki Kamifuku as "Team White" to defeat "Team Red" (Hyper Misao, Mahiro Kiryu, Maki Itoh, Nodoka Tenma, Pom Harajuku, Raku, Sena Shiori, Shoko Nakajima, Suzume and Yuna Manase). on November 7, 2020, at TJPW's Wrestle Princess I, Noa unsuccessfully faced Yuki Kamifuku in the finals for the vacant International Princess Championship after she defeated Pom Harajuku and Mirai Maiumi in the previous phases.

On May 4, 2021, Noa defeated Kamifuku to win the International Princess Championship. On June 17, Noa had her first successful title defense by defeating Marika Kobashi. On January 4, 2022, at TJPW's Tokyo Joshi Pro '22, Noa lost her title to Maki Itoh, ending her reign at 245 days. On October 9, at Wrestle Princess IV, Noa alongside Nao Kakuta defeated Toyo Mates (Mahiro Kiryu and Yuki Kamifuku) to win the vacant Princess Tag Team Championship. On December 30, it was announced on a press conference that Noa would be taking time off due to an illness and relinquished the championships. On February 20, DDT announced that Noa would be taking time off indefinitely. This ultimately lead to her sudden departure from TJPW, and the Up Up Girls group she was in, on May 19, 2024.

=== DDT Pro Wrestling (2018–2024) ===
Due to Tokyo Joshi Pro-Wrestling being the sister promotion of DDT, Noa is known for her sporadic appearances in the latter federation. At DDT Street Wrestling In Tokyo Dome Returns on October 31, 2021, she competed in a gauntlet tag team match where she teamed up with Hyper Misao to face the teams of The37Kamiina (Konosuke Takeshita, Mao, Shunma Katsumata and Yuki Ueno), Brahman Brothers (Brahman Kei and Brahman Shu), Chris Brookes and Gorgeous Matsuno, 121000000 (Maki Ito and Miyu Yamashita), Pheromones (Danshoku Dino, Yuki Iino and Yumehito Imanari) and Tetsuya Endo, and Kazuki Hirata, Kazusada Higuchi, Kouzi and Shinya Aoki.

Noa is also known for competing in various of DDT's signature events. As for the DDT Peter Pan branch of events, she made her first appearance at Wrestle Peter Pan 2021 on August 21 where she teamed up with Kuro-chan, Super Sasadango Machine and Tetsuhiro Kuroda in a losing effort against Atsushi Onita, Sanshiro Takagi, Akito and Maki Itoh as a result of an Electric Current Explosion eight-person Deathmatch.

=== Independent circuit (2019–2024; 2026-present) ===
At CyberFight Festival 2021, a cross-over event promoted by TJPW in partnership with DDT Pro Wrestling and Pro Wrestling Noah on June 6, Noa teamed up with Mizuki and Yuki Arai in a losing effort against Saitama Itoh Respect Army (Maki Itoh, Yuki Kamifuku and Marika Kobashi).

On April 11, 2026, Noa and Unagi Sayaka announced her return to professional wrestling at Sayaka's self produced show.

== Championships and accomplishments ==
- Pro Wrestling Illustrated
  - Ranked No. 109 of the top 150 female singles wrestlers in the PWI Women's 150 in 2021
  - Ranked No. 88 of the top 100 tag teams in the PWI Tag Team 100 of 2023 with Nao Kakuta
- Tokyo Joshi Pro Wrestling
  - International Princess Championship (1 time)
  - Princess Tag Team Championship (1 time) – with Nao Kakuta
