= Nodoka Tenma =

Japanese professional wrestler

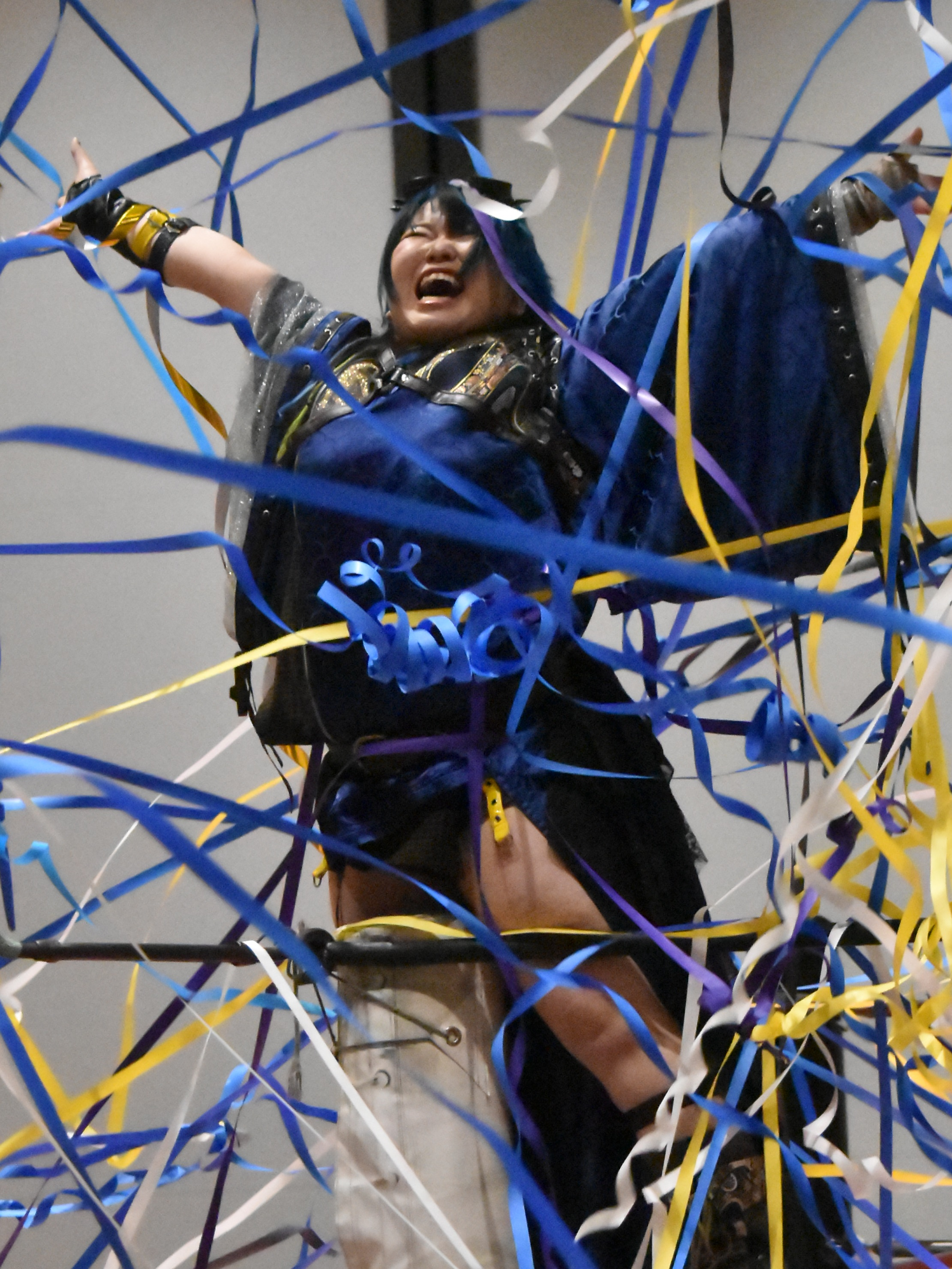
- Tenma in March 2022

Personal information
- Born: June 7 Okayama, Japan
- Spouse: Ryuichi Sekine (m. 2022)
- Family: Yuki Aino (sister)

Professional wrestling career
- Ring name(s): Mil Nodocaras; Nodoka-Oneesan; Nodoka Tenma; Shio
- Billed height: 146 cm (4 ft 9 in)
- Trained by: Cherry
- Debut: 2015
- Retired: 2022

Nodoka Tenma (天満のどか, Tenma Nodoka) also known as Nodoka-Oneesan is a retired Japanese professional wrestler best known for her time in the Japanese promotion Tokyo Joshi Pro-Wrestling.

== Professional wrestling career ==
=== Tokyo Joshi Pro-Wrestling (2015–2022) ===
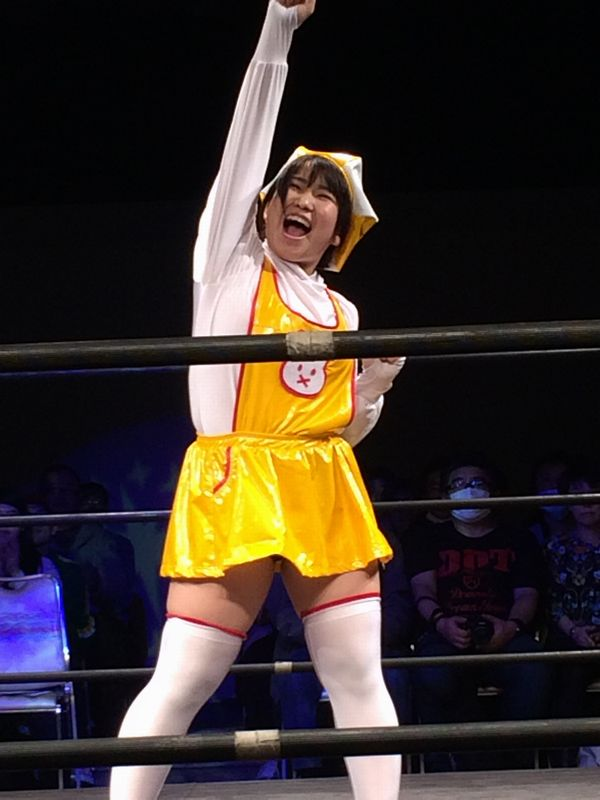
Tenma in March 2016

Tenma made her professional wrestling debut in Tokyo Joshi Pro-Wrestling at TJPW Turn The Next Corner on December 22, 2015, where she fell short to Yuu in an exhibition match. During her time in the promotion, she chased after various championships promoted by it. At Wrestle Princess I on November 7, 2020, Tenma won the Princess Tag Team Championship alongside her "Bakuretsu Sisters" tag team partner Yuki Aino by defeating Hakuchuumu (Miu Watanabe and Rika Tatsumi). At TJPW Tokyo Joshi 2021 Autumn on December 4, she competed in a battle royal for the number one contendership to the International Princess Championship won by Maki Itoh and also involving other notable opponents such as Nao Kakuta) and Suzume and Yuki Arai.

=== DDT Pro-Wrestling (2016–2022) ===
Due to being a TJPW wrestler, Tenma is known for competing in sister-promotion DDT Pro-Wrestling. She made appearances in several of the promotion's signature events such as the DDT Judgement, marking her first performance at Judgement 2016: DDT 19th Anniversary on March 21 where she participated in a 13-woman battle royal won by Yuka Sakazaki and also involving Ai Shimizu, Marika Kobashi, Miyu Yamashita, Azusa Takigawa and others. Three years later at Judgement 2019: DDT 22nd Anniversary on February 17, she teamed up with Yuki Aino and Yuna Manase to defeat Natsupoi, Hikari Noa and Miu Watanabe. Another branch of events in which Tenma has worked is DDT Peter Pan, making her first appearance at Ryōgoku Peter Pan 2017 on August 20, where she competed in a Rumble rules match for the Ironman Heavymetalweight Championship won by Yuu and also involving Yuna Manase, Mizuki, Azuki Takigawa and others. At Wrestle Peter Pan 2019 on July 15, Tenma teamed up with Yuki Aino and Rika Tatsumi to defeat Natsumi Maki, Yuna Manase and Himawari Unagi. On the second night of Wrestle Peter Pan 2020 from June 7, Tenma teamed up with Yuki Aino and Rika Tatsumi in a losing effort against MiraClians (Yuka Sakazaki and Shoko Nakajima) and Miyu Yamashita. The last branch of events she competed in was the DDT Ultimate Party in which she made her only appearance at the 2019 edition where she teamed up with Yuki Aino and unsuccessfully competed in a Gauntlet tag team match won by Nautilus (Yuki Ueno and Naomi Yoshimura) and also involving Yukio Naya and Cody Hall, Yukio Sakaguchi and Ryota Nakatsu, Shuichiro Katsumura and Kouki Iwasaki, and NEO Itoh Respect Army (Maki Itoh and Chris Brookes).

=== Pro Wrestling Noah (2021) ===
Due to TJPW being a promotion patroned by the CyberFight company, Tenma competed in cross-over events held between the three promotions owned by it, those being TJPW, DDT and Pro Wrestling Noah. The only event of such kind was the CyberFight Festival 2021 from June 6, where she teamed up with Yuki Aino in a losing effort against Hyper Misao and Shoko Nakajima, and Hakuchumu (Miu Watanabe and Rika Tatsumi) in a three-way tag team match.

== Personal life ==
Tenma is real life sisters with former "Bakuretsu Sisters" tag team partner Yuki Aino. She married fellow professional wrestler Ryuichi Sekine in December 2022.

== Championships and accomplishments ==
- DDT Pro-Wrestling
  - Ironman Heavymetalweight Championship (1 time)
- Tokyo Joshi Pro Wrestling
  - Princess Tag Team Championship (1 time) – with Yuki Aino
