= International Princess Championship =

Women's professional wrestling championship

- Second and current design of the title (2026–present)

Details
- Promotion: CyberFight
- Brand: Tokyo Joshi Pro-Wrestling
- Date established: July 16, 2019
- Current champion: Suzume
- Date won: March 29, 2026
Statistics
- First champion: Natsumi Maki
- Most reigns: (2 reigns): Maki Itoh; Suzume
- Longest reign: Yuki Arai (366 days)
- Shortest reign: Natsumi Maki (22 days)
- Oldest champion: Thunder Rosa (33 years, 167 days)
- Youngest champion: Hikari Noa (23 years, 75 days)
- Heaviest champion: Max the Impaler (110 kg (240 lb))
- Lightest champion: Natsumi Maki (46.5 kg (103 lb))

The International Princess Championship (Japanese: インターナショナル・プリンセス王座, Hepburn: Intānashonaru Purinsesu Ōza) is a women's professional wrestling championship owned by CyberFight and promoted by Tokyo Joshi Pro Wrestling (TJPW). The title was introduced on July 16, 2019, and the inaugural champion was crowned on August 25, 2019, when Natsumi Maki defeated Gisele Shaw.

== History ==
First design of the belt (2019–2026)

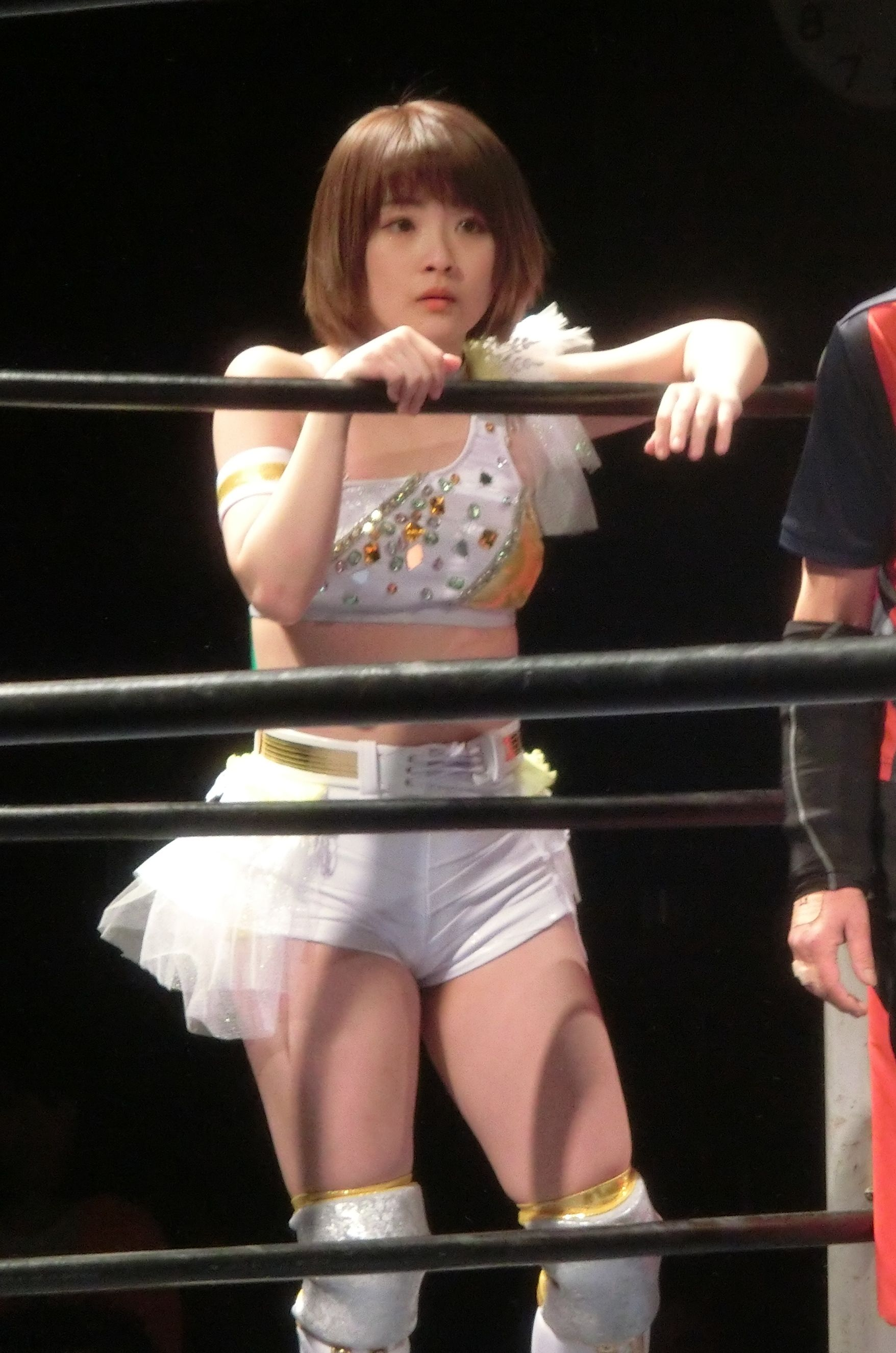
The inaugural champion Natsumi Maki

On August 25, 2019, Natsumi Maki was crowned the inaugural champion by defeating Gisele Shaw at Brand New Wrestling 3: Stronger Than Anyone!. On September 16, 2019, Maki dropped the title to Yuna Manase after sustaining an injury. On October 7, 2020, then-champion Thunder Rosa relinquished the championship as she was unable to travel to Japan due to COVID-19 restrictions. A new champion was crowned on November 7, at Wrestle Princess, where Yuki Kamifuku won the vacant title by defeating Hikari Noa in the finals of an eight-woman single-elimination tournament.

On March 18, 2023, Rika Tatsumi defeated the previous champion Miu Watanabe to win the title, thus becoming TJPW's first Grand Slam Champion.

=== International Princess Championship Tournament (2020) ===
First round TJPW Fall Tour '20 ~ WOMM (Wrestling of My Mind) ~ (October 10 and 17)
Mahiro Kiryu	8:42
Mirai Maiumi	Sub
Hikari Noa	Pin
Pom Harajuku	7:40
Raku	10:25
Shoko Nakajima	Pin
Suzume	7:40
Yuki Kamifuku	Pin

Semifinals; Wrestle Princess (November 7)
Mirai Maiumi	9:44
Hikari Noa	Pin
Shoko Nakajima	9:44
Yuki Kamifuku	Pin

Finals; Wrestle Princess
Hikari Noa	7:56
Yuki Kamifuku	Pin

== Reigns ==
As of November 18, 2026, there have been a total of 17 reigns shared between 15 champions and one vacancy. Natsumi Maki was the inaugural champion. Maki Itoh and Suzume holds the record for most reigns at two. Yuki Arai has the longest reign at 366 days, while Natsumi Maki has the shortest at 22 days. Rosa is the oldest champion at 33 years old, while Hikari Noa is the youngest at 23 years old.

Suzume is the current champion in her second reign. She won the title by defeating Mirai at Grand Princess in Tokyo, Japan on March 29, 2026.

Key
No.	Overall reign number
Reign	Reign number for the specific champion
Days	Number of days held
Defenses	Number of successful defenses
+	Current reign is changing daily

No.	Champion	Championship change			Reign statistics			Notes	Ref.
No.	Champion	Date	Event	Location	Reign	Days	Defenses	Notes	Ref.
1	Natsumi Maki	August 25, 2019	Brand New Wrestling 3: Stronger Than Anyone!	Tokyo, Japan	1	22	0	Defeated Gisele Shaw in a decision match to become inaugural champion.	
2	Yuna Manase	September 16, 2019	KFC 2Days: Desert Moon	Tokyo, Japan	1	33	0	Natsumi Maki suffered an injury during the match, so Manase pinned her to win.	
3	Maki Itoh	October 19, 2019	My life; let's enjoy!!	Tokyo, Japan	1	78	2	This was a DDT Pro Wrestling event.	
4	Thunder Rosa	January 5, 2020	New Year Dish Pro Wrestling	Tokyo, Japan	1	276	0		
—	Vacated	October 7, 2020	—	—	—	—	—	Thunder Rosa relinquished the championship as she was unable to travel to Japan due to COVID-19 restrictions.	
5	Yuki Kamifuku	November 7, 2020	Wrestle Princess I	Tokyo, Japan	1	178	3	Defeated Hikari Noa in the finals of an eight-woman single-elimination tournament to win the vacant championship.	
6	Hikari Noa	May 4, 2021	Yes! Wonderland 2021: We Are Still in the Middle of Our Dreams	Tokyo, Japan	1	245	4		
7	Maki Itoh	January 4, 2022	Tokyo Joshi Pro	Tokyo, Japan	2	186	4		
8	Alex Windsor	July 9, 2022	Summer Sun Princess	Tokyo, Japan	1	92	1		
9	Miu Watanabe	October 9, 2022	Wrestle Princess III	Tokyo, Japan	1	160	3		
10	Rika Tatsumi	March 18, 2023	Grand Princess	Tokyo, Japan	1	205	4		
11	Max the Impaler	October 9, 2023	Wrestle Princess IV	Tokyo, Japan	1	87	3	This was also for Max's NWA World Women's Television Championship.	
12	Yuki Arai	January 4, 2024	Tokyo Joshi Pro	Tokyo, Japan	1	366	6		
13	Suzume	January 4, 2025	Tokyo Joshi Pro	Tokyo, Japan	1	198	5		
14	Moka Miyamoto	July 21, 2025	Summer Sun Princess	Tokyo, Japan	1	38	0		
—	Vacated	August 28, 2025	—	—	—	—	—	Moka Miyamoto relinquished the championship due to being sidelined with illness.	
15	Arisu Endo	September 20, 2025	Wrestle Princess VI	Tokyo, Japan	1	106	2	Defeated Priscilla Kelly to win the vacant title.	
16	Mirai	January 4, 2026	Tokyo Joshi Pro	Tokyo, Japan	1	84	1		
17	Suzume	March 29, 2026	Grand Princess	Tokyo, Japan	2	234+	5		

== Combined reigns ==
As of November 18, 2026.

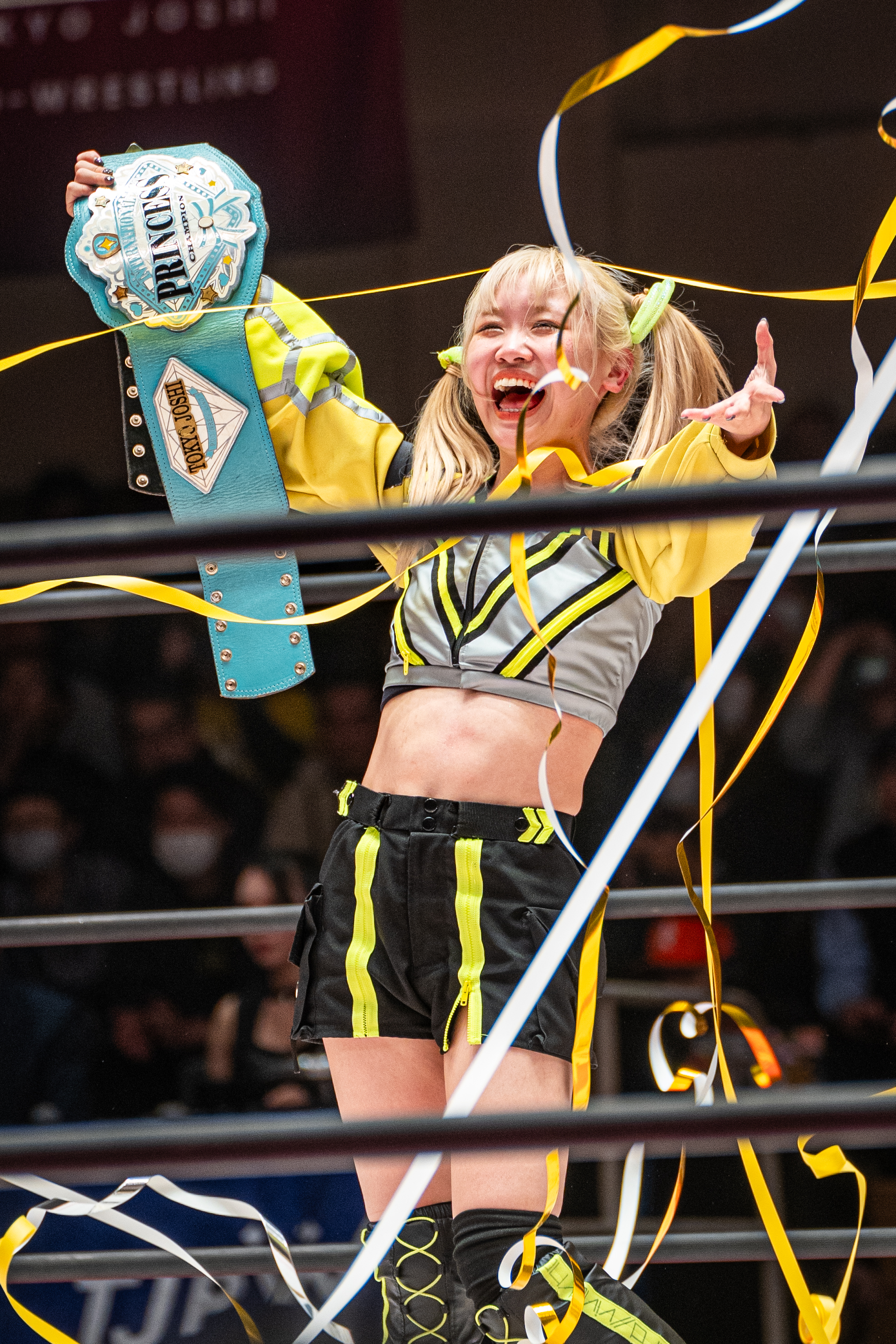
Record-tying two-time and current champion, Suzume.

†	Indicates the current champion

Rank	Wrestler	No. of reigns	Combined defenses	Combined days
1	Suzume †	2	10	432+
2	Yuki Arai	1	6	366
3	Thunder Rosa	1	0	276
4	Maki Itoh	2	6	264
5	Hikari Noa	1	4	246
6	Rika Tatsumi	1	4	205
7	Yuki Kamifuku	1	3	178
8	Miu Watanabe	1	3	160
9	Arisu Endo	1	2	106
10	Alex Windsor	1	1	92
11	Max the Impaler	1	3	87
12	Mirai	1	1	84
13	Moka Miyamoto	1	0	38
14	Yuna Manase	1	0	33
15	Natsumi Maki	1	0	22

== See also ==
- Princess of Princess Championship
- Princess Tag Team Championship
- GHC Women's Championship
