= Mizuki (wrestler) =

Japanese professional wrestler

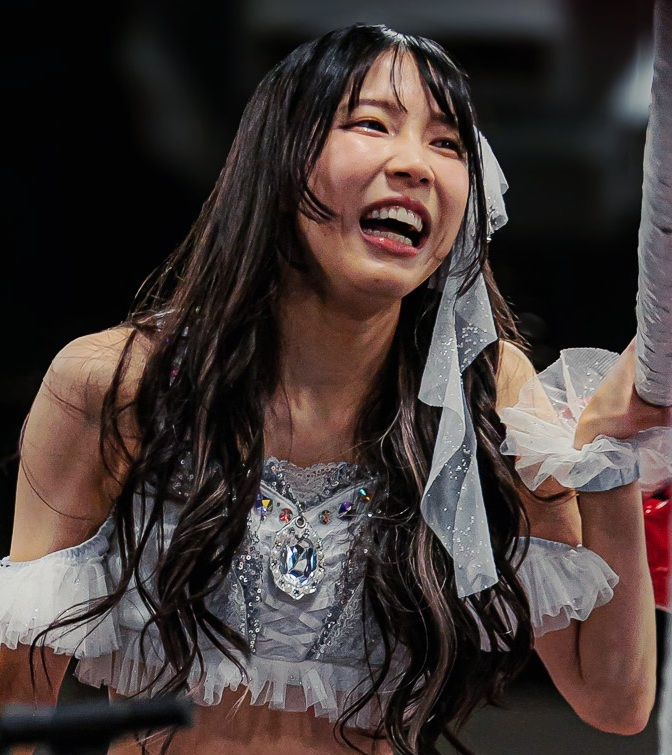
- Mizuki in March 2026

Personal information
- Born: Mizuki Kaminade; March 16, 1995 (age 31) Kōbe, Hyōgo Prefecture, Japan

Professional wrestling career
- Ring name: Mizuki
- Billed height: 1.58 m (5 ft 2 in)
- Billed weight: 40 kg (88 lb)
- Trained by: Takako Inoue; Tomoka Nakagawa; Emi Sakura
- Debut: December 29, 2012

Mizuki Kaminade (上撫 瑞希, Kaminade Mizuki; born March 16, 1995), better known by her ring name Mizuki (瑞希, Mizuki) (stylized in all caps) is a Japanese professional wrestler. She is signed to DDT Pro-Wrestling, where she is formerly one-fifth of the KO-D 10-Man Tag Team Champions, as well as Tokyo Joshi Pro Wrestling, where she is a two-time Princess of Princess Champion. She is also a former three-time Princess Tag Team Champion.

== Professional wrestling career ==
=== Tokyo Joshi Pro Wrestling (2017-present) ===
On April 8, 2017, Mizuki made her debut at Tokyo Joshi Pro Wrestling (TJPW) where she defeated Maki Ito. In July, Mizuki participated in the annual Tokyo Princess Cup where she advanced to the semi-final where she was defeated by Yuka Sakazaki on July 30, who was the Tokyo Princess of Princess Champion at the time. Mizuki teamed with Ito in a tournament to crown the inaugural Tokyo Princess Tag Team Champions, where they lost in the semi-final to the team of Sakazaki and Shoko Nakajima on September 16.

In 2018, Mizuki, along with Sakazaki formed a team named "Magical Sugar Rabbits". The two faced each other again on June 9 in the Tokyo Princess Cup, where Mizuki lost to Sakazaki in the first round. On August 25, 2018, Magical Sugar Rabbits defeated Ito and Reika Saiki to win the vacant Princess Tag Team Championship. Magical Sugar Rabbits had their first successful title defense on October 8, when they defeated Bakuretsu Sisters (Nodoka Tenma and Yuki Aino).

On June 8, 2019, Magical Sugar Rabbits lost the Princess Tag Team Championship to Neo Biishiki-gun (Misao and Saki Akai), ending their reign at 287 days with 6 successful title defenses. On July 7, Mizuki won the Tokyo Princess Cup after defeating Yuna Manase in the finals. After winning the Tokyo Princess Cup, Mizuki challenged Nakajima, who was then the Princess of Princess Champion, on September 1, but was unsuccessful.

On August 29, 2020, Mizuki won the Tokyo Princess Cup for the second year in a row after defeating Nakajima in the finals, making her the only wrestler to win the Cup back-to-back. On November 7, at the main event of Wrestle Princess I, Mizuki challenged her own tag team partner Sakazaki for the Princess of Princess Championship, but was unsuccessful. On November 14, Mizuki officially signed to TJPW. On October 9, 2021, at TJPW's Wrestle Princess II, Mizuki and Sakazaki defeated Neo Biishiki-gun (Mei Saint-Michel and Sakisama) to win the Princess Tag Team Championship for their second time as a team. On July 9, 2022, at TJPW's Summer Sun Princess, Mizuki and Sakazaki lost their tag titles to Saki Akai and Yuki Arai, ending their reign at 273 days.

On March 18, 2023, at Grand Princess '23, Mizuki defeated Sakazaki to win the Princess of Princess Championship for the first time. Thirteen days later, at TJPW Live in Los Angeles, Mizuki teamed with Sakazaki to defeat 121000000 (Maki Itoh and Miyu Yamashita) to win the Princess Tag Team Championship for a third time. On April 15, at TJPW's Stand Alone, Mizuki had her first successful Princess of Princess Championship defense after submitting Nao Kakuta. On June 9, Mizuki vacated the tag titles after Sakazaki was diagnosed with a neck injury. On October 9, at Wrestle Princess IV, Mizuki lost the Princess of Princess Championship to Miyu Yamashita, ending her reign at 205 days.

On January 4, 2025, at Tokyo Joshi Pro '25, Mizuki defeated Miu Watanabe to win the Princess of Princess Champmionship for the second time. On March 16, at Grand Princess '25, she defeated Rika Tatsumi in her first title defense. On April 18, at TJPW Live in Las Vegas, Mizuki secured her second title defense by defeating Miyu Yamashita. On July 21, at Summer Sun Princess '25, she defeated Yuki Arai for her third title defense. On September 20, at Wrestle Princess VI, Mizuki dropped the Princess of Princess Championship back to Watanabe, ending her reign at 259 days.

== Championships and accomplishments ==
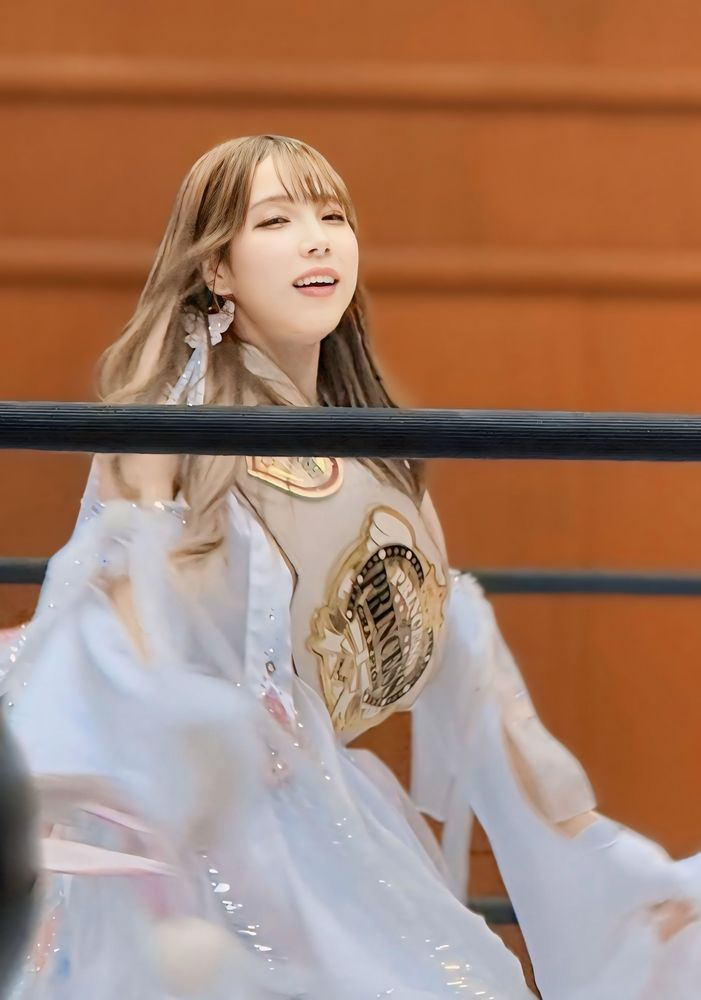
In TJPW, Mizuki is a two-time Princess of Princess Champion...

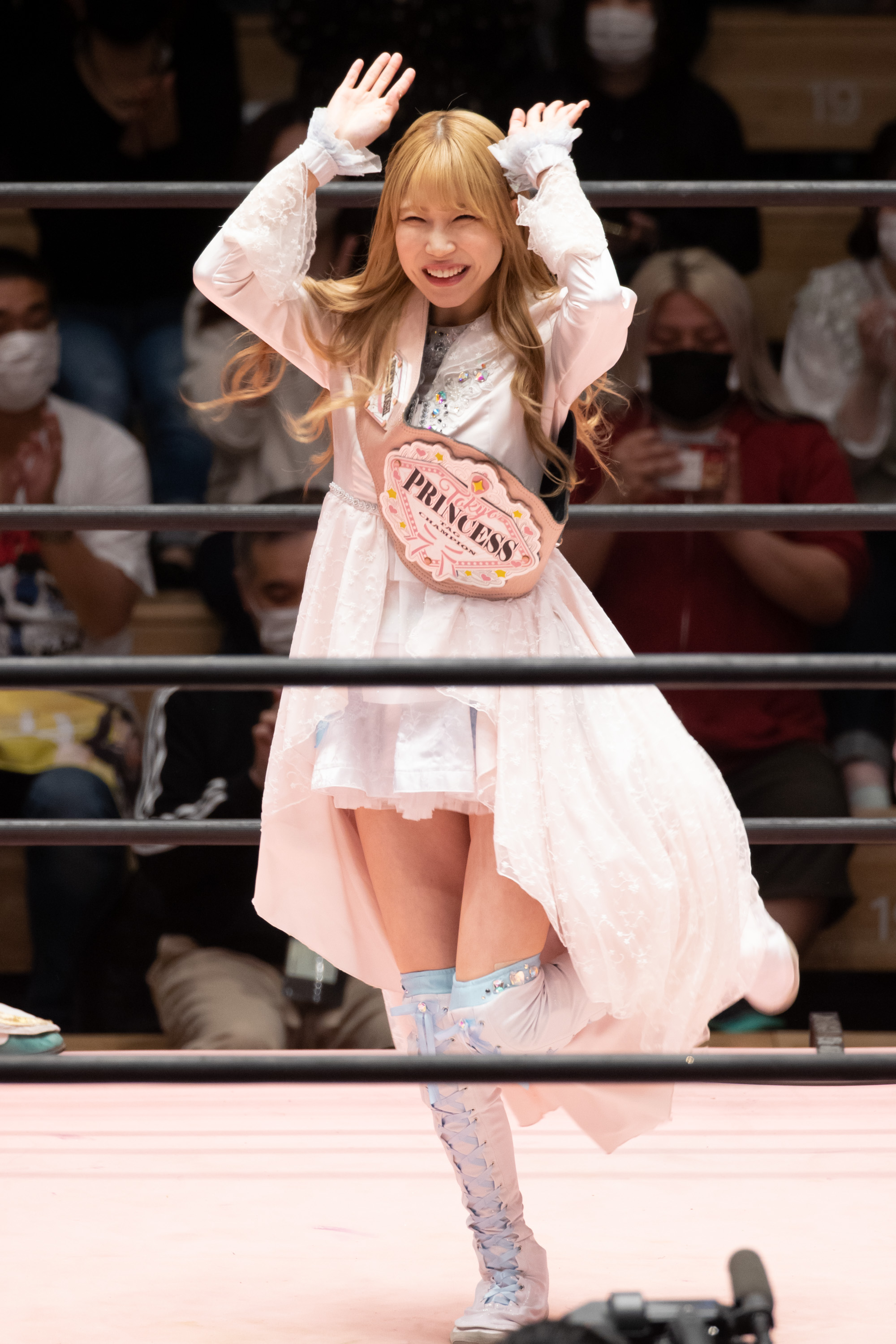
...and a three-time Princess Tag Team Champion.

- DDT Pro-Wrestling
  - KO-D 10-Man Tag Team Championship (1 time) – with Asuka, Danshoku Dino, Trans-Am Hiroshi and Yuki Iino
  - Ironman Heavymetalweight Championship (2 times)
- Gatoh Move Pro Wrestling
  - Asia Dream Tag Team Championship (2 times, inaugural) – with Saki
- Pro Wrestling Illustrated
  - Ranked No. 108 of the top 150 women's wrestlers in the PWI Women's 150 in 2022
- Tokyo Joshi Pro Wrestling
  - Princess of Princess Championship (2 times)
  - Princess Tag Team Championship (3 times) – with Yuka Sakazaki (Note: Mizuki's first reign was when the championship was called the Tokyo Princess Tag Team Championship.)
  - Tokyo Princess Cup (2019, 2020)
