= Hyper Misao =

Japanese professional wrestler

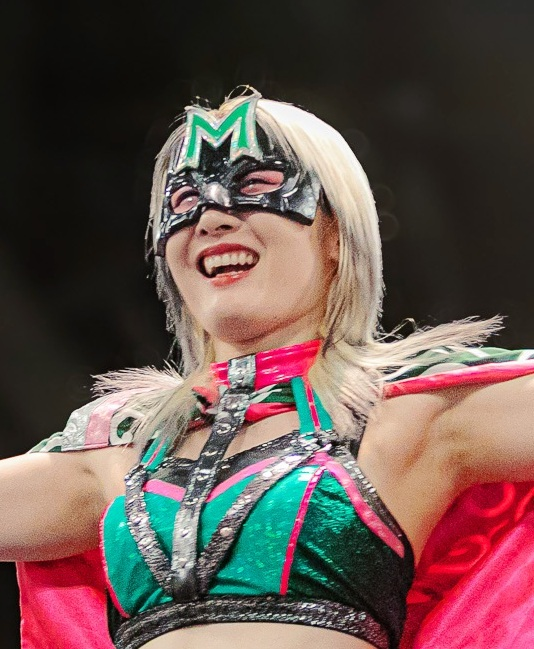
- Misao in March 2026

Personal information
- Born: January 3, 1990 (age 36) Ibaraki, Japan

Professional wrestling career
- Ring names: Akemi Daredasore; Hyper Misao; Max Pasa; Misao
- Billed height: 164 cm (5 ft 5 in)
- Debut: 2015

Hyper Misao (ハイパーミサヲ, Haipā Misao) is a Japanese professional wrestler working for the Japanese promotions Tokyo Joshi Pro Wrestling and DDT Pro-Wrestling.

== Professional wrestling career ==
=== Tokyo Joshi Pro Wrestling (2015–present) ===
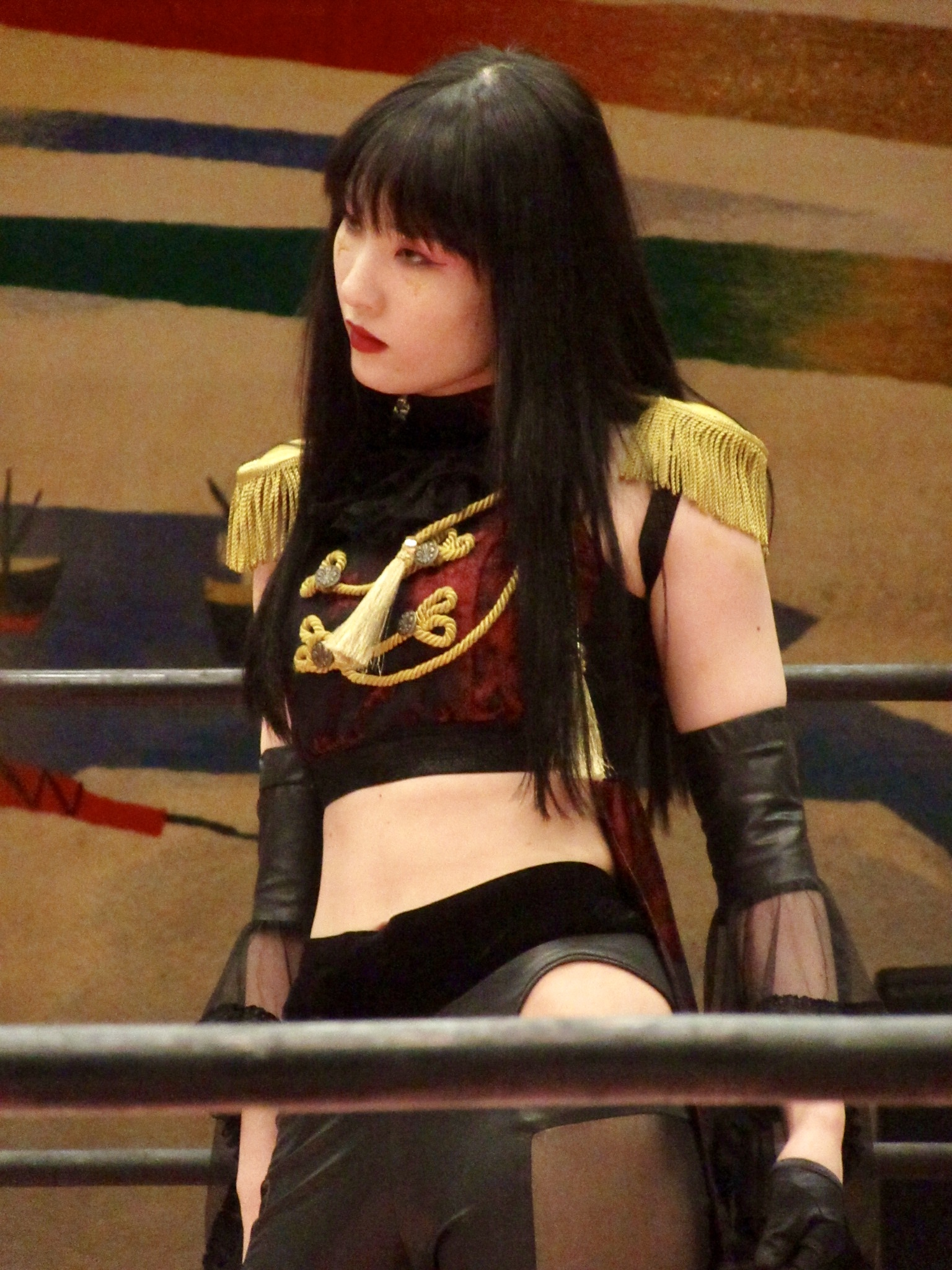
Misao in May 2019 unmasked

Misao became interested in professional wrestling when she encountered a DDT Pro-Wrestling street event which had entered a handmade goods festival she was attending. She made her debut at TJPW Shinjuku Dash on February 28, 2015, where she teamed up with Mizuho in a losing effort against Chikage Kiba and Kanna as a result of a tag team match. During her time in the promotion, she was part of the Neo Biishiki-gun stable and chased after various championships promoted by it. At TJPW Yes! Wonderland 2022 on May 3, she unsuccessfully challenged Shoko Nakajima for the Princess of Princess Championship. At TJPW Spring Tour '22 on April 17, 2022, Misao participated in a 20-on-1 handicap match in which she, alongside Arisu Endo, Haruna Neko, Hikari Noa, Maki Itoh, Yuki Kamifuku, Yuki Arai and others defeated Marika Kobashi. While in a brief abroad excursion, she competed in Pro-Wrestling: EVE's Wrestle Queendom 5 from November 13, 2022, where she teamed up with Session Moth Martina to unsuccessfully challenge The Uprising (Rhia O'Reilly and Skye Smitson) for the Pro-Wrestling: EVE Tag Team Championship. On May 25, 2023, Misao produced the show HYPE!, the sequel to which was held the following year on April 19, 2024.

=== DDT Pro-Wrestling (2015–present) ===
Due to being a TJPW wrestler, Misao is known for competing in sister-promotion DDT Pro-Wrestling. She made appearances in several of the promotion's signature events such as the DDT Judgement, marking her first performance at Judgement 2016: DDT 19th Anniversary on March 21 where she participated in a 13-woman battle royal won by Yuka Sakazaki and also involving Rika Tatsumi, Ai Shimizu, Marika Kobashi, Miyu Yamashita, Azusa Takigawa and others. Another branch of events in which Misao has worked is DDT Peter Pan, making her first appearance at Ryōgoku Peter Pan 2016 on August 28, where she teamed up with Yuu and Shoko Nakajima in a losing effort against Miyu Yamashita, Yuka Sakazaki and Akane Miura. Misao is also known for competing in various other events promoted by DDT. At DDT Street Wrestling In Tokyo Dome Returns from October 31, 2021, she participated in an empty arena gauntlet match won by The37Kamiina (Konosuke Takeshita, Mao, Shunma Katsumata and Yuki Ueno), and also involving the teams of herself and Hikari Noa, the Brahman Brothers (Brahman Kei and Brahman Shu), Chris Brookes and Gorgeous Matsuno, 121000000 (Maki Itoh and Miyu Yamashita), Pheromones (Danshoku Dino, Yuki Iino and Yumehito Imanari), Tetsuya Endo and Kazuki Hirata, and Kazusada Higuchi, Kouzi and Shinya Aoki. At DDT Sauna Over Flowers on February 15, 2022, Misao teamed up with Mecha Mummy to defeat Romance Dawn (Shota and Soma Takao), Akito and Kazuki Hirata, Antonio Honda and Yoshihiko, Kazusada Higuchi and Yuki Ishida, and Naomi Yoshimura and Yukio Naya in a tag team gauntlet match.

=== Pro Wrestling Noah (2021–present) ===
Due to TJPW being a promotion patroned by the CyberFight company, Misao competed several times in cross-over events held between the three promotions owned by it, those being TJPW, DDT and Pro Wrestling Noah. She first competed in the CyberFight Festival 2021 from June 6, where she teamed up with Shoko Nakajima as "Kyōraku Kyōmei" to defeat Hakuchūmu (Rika Tatsumi and Miu Watanabe), and Bakuretsu Sisters (Nodoka Tenma and Yuki Aino) in a three-way tag team match. On eyear later at CyberFight Festival 2022 from June 12, she teamed up with Yuki Aino, Yuuri, Pom Harajuku and Haruna Neko in a losing effort against Nao Kakuta, Mahiro Kiryu, Moka Miyamoto, Arisu Endo and Kaya Toribami.

== Professional wrestling style and persona ==
Misao's character is that of a superhero who claims to be "protecting love and peace" in TJPW, and uses underhanded tactics to get ahead in her matches. She typically carries cold spray which she uses to incapacitate her opponents. Her character was inspired by Western comic books, and she has compared it to Catwoman as portrayed in Batman Returns. During her time in Neo Biishiki-gun, she started to use a lifting double underhook facebuster called Vanitas as her finisher.

== Championships and accomplishments ==
DDT Pro-Wrestling

  - Ironman Heavymetalweight Championship (3 times)
- Pro Wrestling Illustrated
  - Ranked No. 150 of the top 150 female wrestlers in the PWI Women's 150 in 2022
- Tokyo Joshi Pro Wrestling
  - Princess Tag Team Championship (2 times) – with Sakisama (Note: Sakisama and Misao's reign was when the championship was called the Tokyo Princess Tag Team Championship.) and Shoko Nakajima
  - "Futari wa Princess" Max Heart Tournament (2025) – with Shoko Nakajima
