= Rika Tatsumi =

Japanese professional wrestler

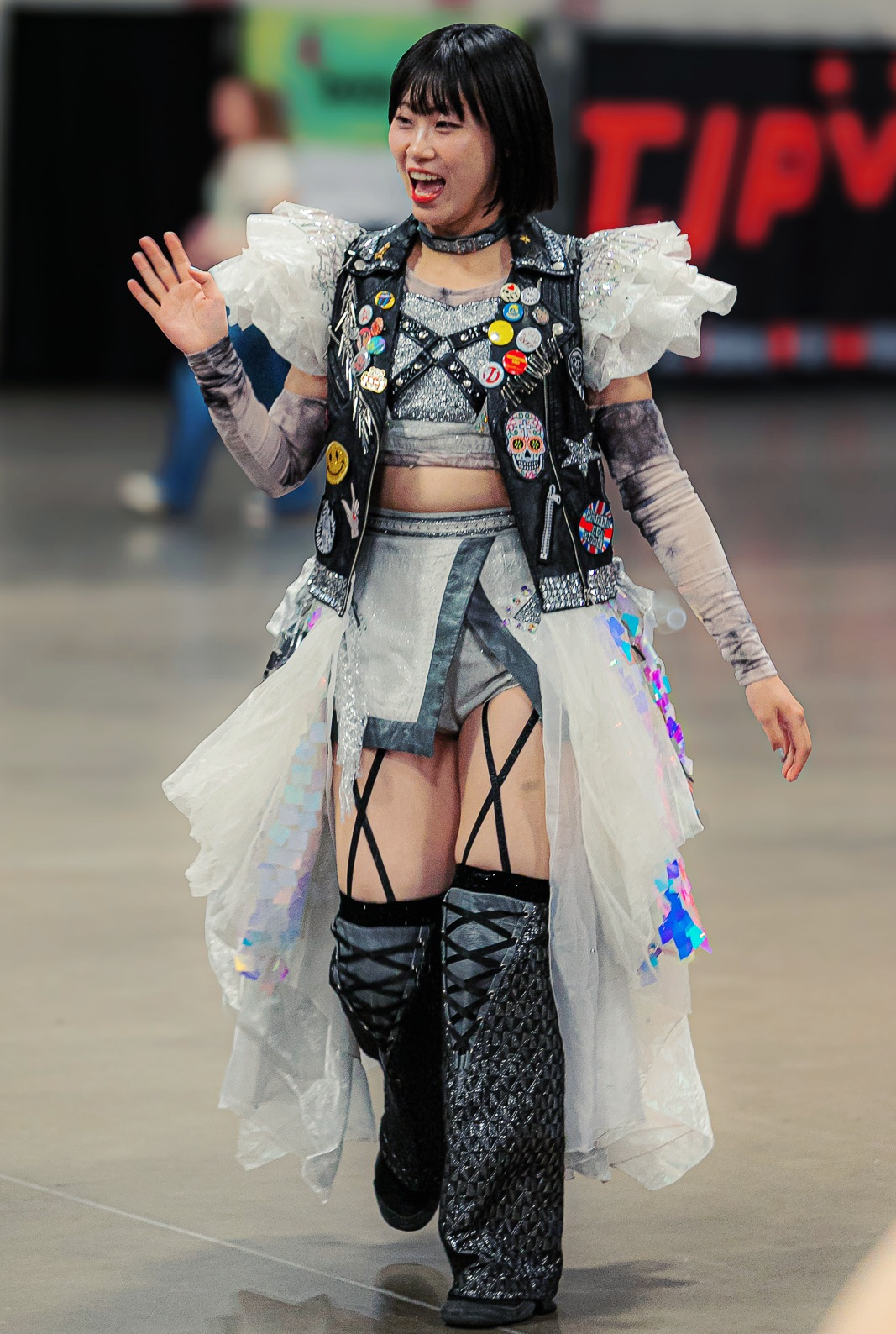
- Tatsumi in March 2026

Personal information
- Born: Ririko Ishizawa; September 27, 1991 (age 35) Nagano, Japan

Professional wrestling career
- Ring name(s): Ririko Kendo; Rika Tatsumi
- Billed height: 163 cm (5 ft 4 in)
- Debut: January 28, 2014

Ririko Ishizawa (石澤りりこ, Ishizawa Ririko; born September 27, 1991) better known by her ring name Rika Tatsumi (辰巳リカ, Tatsumi Rika) is a Japanese professional wrestler working for the Japanese promotions Tokyo Joshi Pro-Wrestling (TJPW) and DDT Pro Wrestling.

== Professional wrestling career ==
=== Tokyo Joshi Pro-Wrestling (2014–present) ===
Ishizawa made her professional wrestling debut at Shibuya Entertainment Fight 1, an event promoted by Tokyo Joshi Pro-Wrestling (TJPW) on January 28, 2014 under the name of Ririko Kendo (ケンドー・リリコ, Kendō Ririko) where she fell short to Shoko Nakajima. On January 4, 2021 at Tokyo Joshi Pro '21, Ishizawa who now wrestles as Rika Tatsumi, defeated Yuka Sakazaki to win the Princess of Princess Championship for the first time.

On May 4, at Yes! Wonderland 2021: We Are Still in the Middle of Our Dreams, Tatsumi dropped the title to Miyu Yamashita, ending her reign at 120 days. On March 18, 2023, at Grand Princess '23, Tatsumi defeated Miu Watanabe to win the International Princess Championship for the first time, and became TJPW's first ever Grand Slam winner. On October 9, at Wrestle Princess IV, Tatsumi lost the title to the NWA World Women's Television Champion Max the Impaler in a Winner-takes-all match for both of the titles, ending her reign at 205 days.

=== DDT Pro Wrestling (2015–present) ===
Due to TJPW being in direct partnership with DDT Pro-Wrestling (DDT), Ishizawa worked in various events of the latter. At CyberFight Festival 2021, a cross-over event promoted by TJPW, DDT and Pro Wrestling Noah on June 6, she teamed up with her "Hakuchumu" tag team partner Miu Watanabe and unsuccessfully challenged Shoko Nakajima and Hyper Misao, and Bakuretsu Sisters (Nodoka Tenma and Yuki Aino) in a three-way tag team match.

She also worked in the DDT Peter Pan branch of events. At Ryōgoku Peter Pan 2017 on August 20, she participated in a Rumble rules match for the Ironman Heavymetalweight Championship also involving Yuu, Mizuki, Tetsuya Koda and others. At Wrestle Peter Pan 2019 on July 15, she teamed up with Bakuretsu Sisters (Nodoka Tenma and Yuki Aino) to defeat Natsumi Maki, Yuna Manase and Himawari Unagi in a Six-woman tag team match. On the second night of Wrestle Peter Pan 2020 from June 7, she teamed up with Bakuretsu Sisters (Nodoka Tenma and Yuki Aino) in a losing effort to MiraClians (Yuka Sakazaki and Shoko Nakajima) and Miyu Yamashita.

As for the DDT Ultimate Party series, she made an appearance Ultimate Party 2019 on November 3 she teamed up with Miu Watanabe and defeated NEO Biishiki-gun (Sakisama and Misao) to win the Princess Tag Team Championship.

Another branch of events in which she worked was DDT Judgement. She made her first appearance at Judgement 2017: DDT 20th Anniversary on March 20 where she teamed up with Reika Saiki and Azusa Takigawa in a losing effort to Yuu, Mil Clown and Maki Itoh. At Judgement 2018: DDT 21st Anniversary on March 25, she teamed up with Maho Kurone in a losing effort to MiraClians (Yuka Sakazaki and Shoko Nakajima).

== Championships and accomplishments ==
- DDT Pro-Wrestling
  - Ironman Heavymetalweight Championship (8 times)
- Pro Wrestling Illustrated
  - Ranked No. 53 of the top 250 female singles wrestlers in the PWI Women's 250 in 2023
- Tokyo Joshi Pro Wrestling
  - Princess of Princess Championship (1 time)
  - Princess Tag Team Championship (2 times) – with Miu Watanabe
  - International Princess Championship (1 time)
  - "Futari wa Princess" Max Heart Tournament (2022) – with Miu Watanabe
  - Princess of the Decade Tournament (2023)
  - First Grand Slam Champion
