= Shoko Nakajima =

Japanese professional wrestler

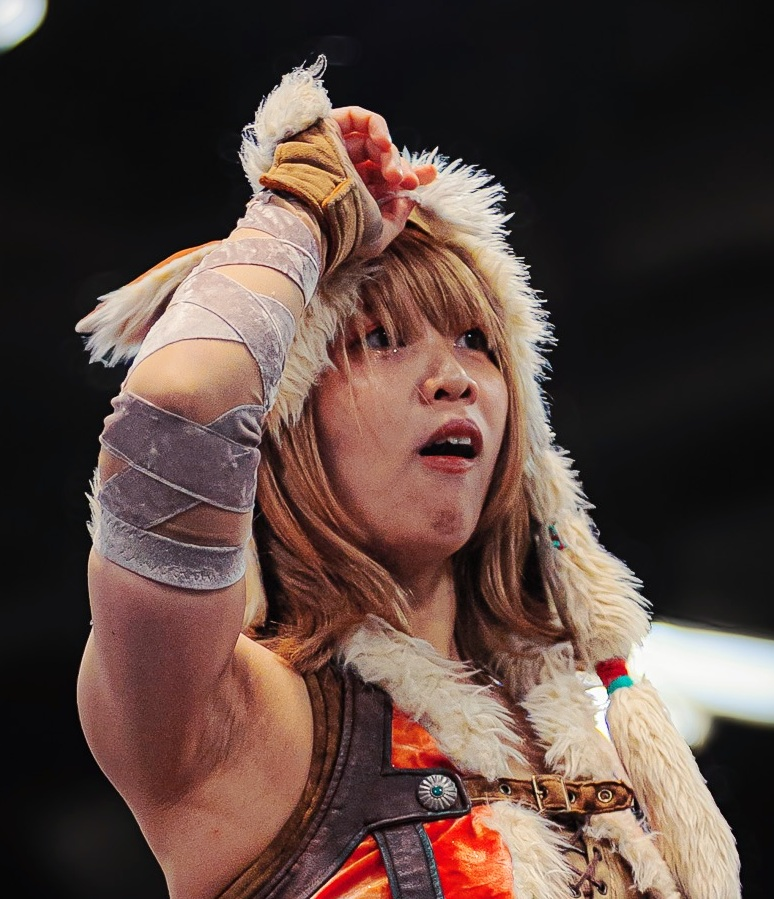
- Nakajima in March 2026

Personal information
- Born: July 19, 1991 (age 35) Niigata, Japan

Professional wrestling career
- Ring name(s): Shin Ultra Shoko; Shoko Nakajima
- Billed height: 1.47 m (4 ft 10 in)
- Debut: August 17, 2013

Shoko Nakajima (中島翔子, Nakajima Shōko; born July 19, 1991) is a Japanese female professional wrestler, who wrestles for Tokyo Joshi Pro-Wrestling (TJPW), where she is the current and three time Princess of Princess Champion and a former two-time inaugural Tokyo Princess Tag Team Champion. She also wrestles for Major League Wrestling (MLW), where she is a one-time MLW World Women's Featherweight Champion.

She is also known for her appearances in Chikara, Consejo Mundial de Lucha Libre (CMLL), DDT Pro-Wrestling, All Elite Wrestling (AEW), and Pro Wrestling NOAH.

== Professional wrestling career ==
=== Tokyo Joshi Pro-Wrestling (2013–present) ===
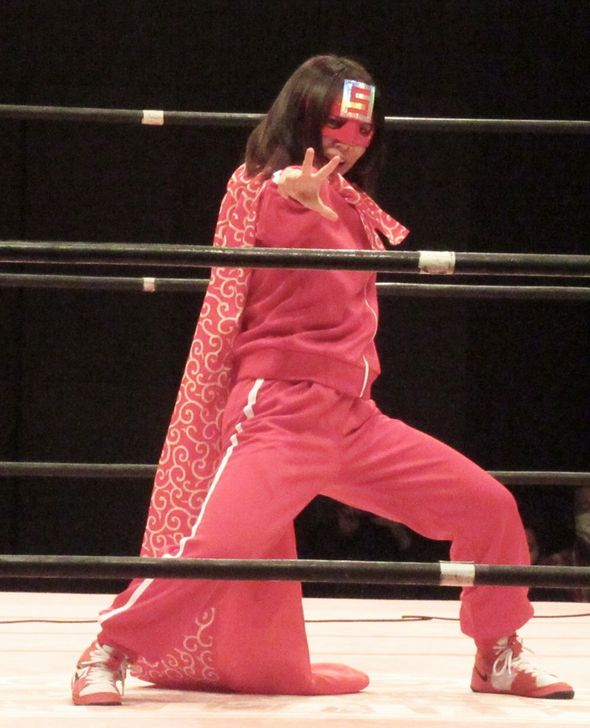
Nakajima as Shin Ultra Shoko in 2021

Nakajima made her ring debut with Miyu Yamashita against Chikage Kiba and Kanna as a dark match of DDT Pro-Wrestling's "World Expo-Progress and Harmony in pro wrestling" held at Ryogoku Kokugikan on August 17, where she was pinned by Kanna. On August 8, 2015, Nakajima won the Tokyo Princess Cup of Tokyo Joshi Pro-Wrestling (TJPW), after defeating Akane Miura in the finals. On January 4, 2016, Nakajima was part of the main event of TJPW's first Korakuen Hall event Tokyo Joshi Pro '16, where she challenged Miyu Yamashita to become the inaugural Tokyo Princess of Princess Champion, however, was unsuccessful.

From September 9, 2017, to October 10, Nakajima teamed with Yuka Sakazaki, to take part in a tournament to crown the inaugural Tokyo Princess Tag Team Championship. In the tournament final, they defeated Maho Kurone and Rika Tatsumi to become the first tag champions. Calling themselves the MiraClians, they made two successful title defenses before losing the titles to Azusa Christie and Sakisama on February 3, 2018, ending their reign at 112 days.

On May 3, 2019, at Yes! Wonderland 2019 ~ Opportunity is There ~, Nakajima defeated Miyu Yamashita for the Tokyo Princess of Princess Championship. Three days later, Nakajima had her first successful title defense by defeating Thunder Rosa. On July 16, TJPW re-named the Tokyo Princess of Princess Championship to Princess of Princess Championship. On November 3, at DDT's Ultimate Party, Nakajima lost the title to her former tag team partner, Yuka Sakazaki, ending her reign at 184 days.

On January 4, 2021, after losing to Hyper Misao, Nakajima was forced to temporarily changed her ring name for a month to Shin Ultra Shoko (シン・ウルトラショヲコ, Shin Urutorashowoko) and to wear a superhero costume, similar to Miaso. The two would challenge the Bakuretsu Sisters (Nodoka Tenma and Yuki Aino) on February 11 for the Princess Tag Team Championship, however, were unsuccessful. On March 19, 2022, at TJPW's Grand Princess '22, Nakajima defeated Yamashita to win the Princess of Princess Championship for the second time in her career. On April 9, Nakajima has her first successful title defense by defeating Aino. On October 9, at Wrestle Princess III, Nakajima lost the title to Sakazaki, ending her reign at 204 days.

=== All Elite Wrestling (2019, 2020) ===
On July 13, 2019, Nakajima made her debut for All Elite Wrestling (AEW) at Fight for the Fallen where she would team with Bea Priestley to defeat Britt Baker and Riho. Nakajima returned to AEW on the February 11, 2020, episode of AEW Dark, being defeated by the AEW Women's World Champion Riho in a non-title match.

=== Consejo Mundial de Lucha Libre (2019) ===
On November 9, 2019, Nakajima made her Consejo Mundial de Lucha Libre (CMLL) debut in a six-women tag team match with La Jarochita and Sanely losing to Dalys la Caribeña, La Amapola and Reyna Isis.

== Championships and accomplishments ==
- DDT Pro Wrestling
  - DDT Ironman Heavymetalweight Championship (4 times)
- Major League Wrestling
  - MLW World Women's Featherweight Championship (1 time)
- Pro Wrestling Illustrated
  - Ranked No. 29 of the top 150 female wrestlers in the PWI Women's 150 in 2022
- Tokyo Joshi Pro Wrestling
  - Princess of Princess Championship (3 times, current) (Note: Nakajima's first reign was when the championship was called the Tokyo Princess of Princess Championship.)
  - Tokyo Princess Tag Team Championship (2 times, inaugural) – with Yuka Sakazaki and Hyper Misao
  - Tokyo Princess Cup (2015)
  - Princess Tag Team Championship Tournament (2017) – with Yuka Sakazaki
  - Spring Beautiful One Day Tournament (2020)
  - "Futari wa Princess" Max Heart Tournament (2025) – with Hyper Misao
