= List of Ironman Heavymetalweight Champions =

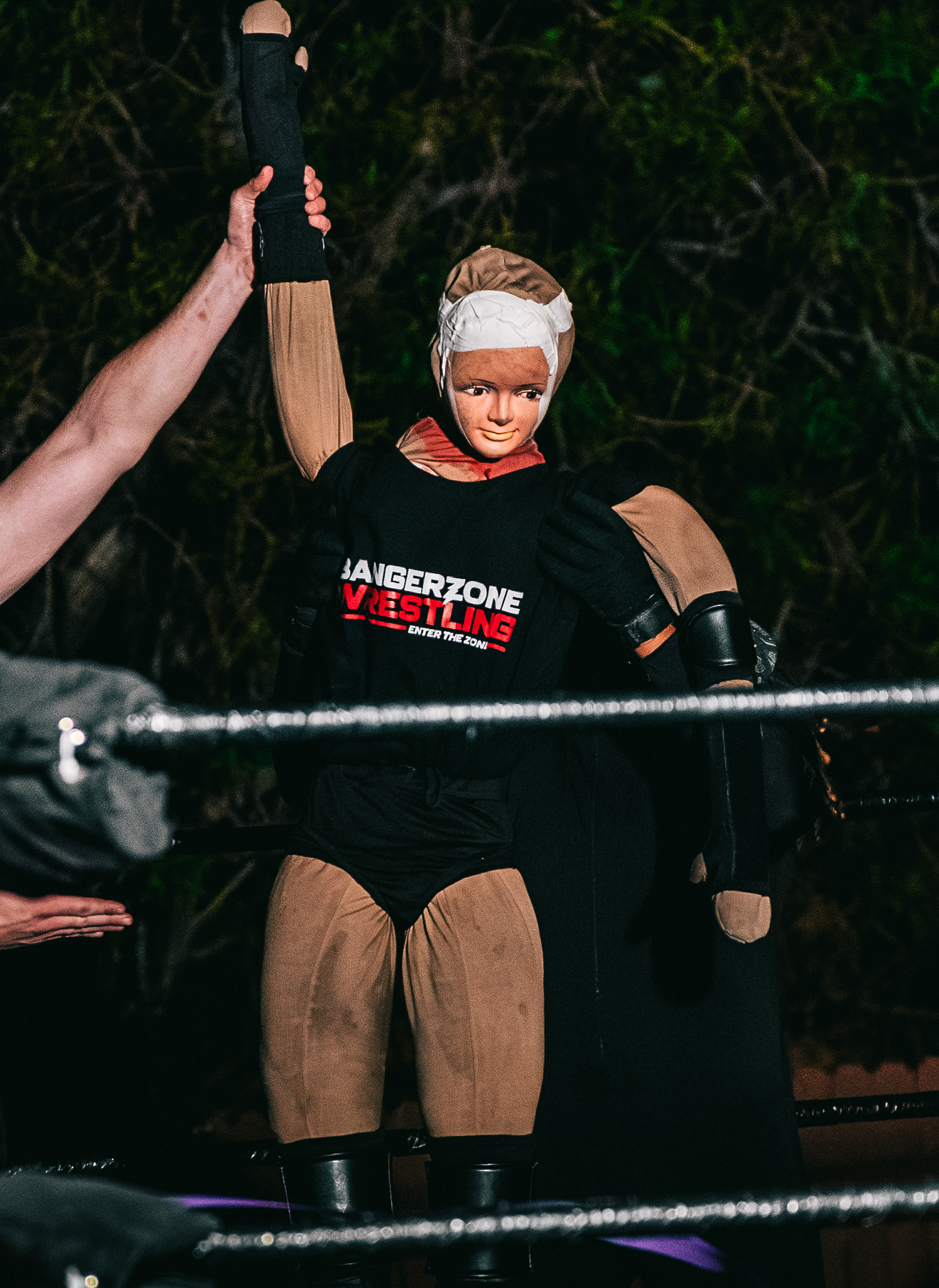
Twenty-four time and current champion Yoshihiko.

The Ironman Heavymetalweight Championship (Japanese: アイアンマンヘビーメタル級王座, Hepburn: Aianman Hebīmetaru-kyū Ōza) is a professional wrestling championship created and promoted by the Japanese promotion DDT Pro-Wrestling (DDT). Open to anyone, regardless of gender or DDT employment status, the championship is defended "24/7", as in any time, anywhere, as long as a referee is there to confirm the win. Because of this rule, not only is the championship winnable regardless of gender or number of individuals (in case of a common pinfall or submission), it is also available to "unconventional" champions such as animals or inanimate objects, with title changes regularly occurring outside of regular shows, often with videos posted on the promotion's social media accounts. It was created as a parody of the defunct WWE Hardcore Championship, which also had a "24/7 rule".

The championship was introduced on the June 29, 2000 TV taping, during which Poison Julie Sawada created the title and awarded it to himself, only to lose it in under three minutes after Mitsunobu Kikuzawa attacked him with the belt and successfully pinned him.

As of November 3, 2026, there have been 1,931 officially recognized reigns between 470 different human individuals, 8 teams and 66 inanimate objects and animals. The record for most reigns is held by Shinobu, who won it 216 times, including by trading the title back-and-forth with 215-time champion Yuko Miyamoto a total of 303 times on the same night. Danshoku Dino holds the record for longest combined reign with at least 534 days and counting (the exact date of when he won his tenth title is uncertain). Masa Takanashi's sixth reign is the longest singular reign at 333 days. Only 166 individuals have held the title for longer than a day. The title has occasionally been won by unusual means, such as an auction for the belt, rock paper scissors, and even a title change that occurred in a dream.

Non-wrestlers to have held the title include AV idol Nao Saejima, voice actors Sumire Uesaka and Tasuku Hatanaka, TV personality LiLiCo, J-pop idols Akari Suda, Kaori Matsumura, Rise Shiokawa, Aika Sawaguchi, Misaki Natsumi, Momomi Wagatsuma and Lingling, Tokyo Metropolitan Assemblyman Shinichiro Kawamatsu, a cat named Bunny, a monkey, a three-time champion ladder, Vince McMahon's Hollywood Walk of Fame star, a copy of The Young Bucks' autobiography Killing the Business, and the title belt itself.

== Title history (2020–present) ==
Key
| No. | Overall reign number |
| Reign | Reign number for the specific team—reign numbers for the individuals are in parentheses, if different |
| Days | Number of days held |
| N/A | Unknown information |
| (NLT) | Championship change took place "no later than" the date listed |
| (NET) | Championship change took place "no earlier than" the date listed |
| <1 | Reign lasted less than a day |
| + | Current reign is changing daily |

| No. | Champion | Championship change | | | Reign statistics | | Notes | Ref. |
| No. | Champion | Date | Event | Location | Reign | Days | Notes | Ref. |
|---|---|---|---|---|---|---|---|---|
| 1458 | Kagami mochi | January 3, 2020 | DDT New Year Special Gift! All Seats 2,000 Yen Box Office!! 2020 | Tokyo, Japan | 1 | <1 | | |
| 1459 | Mizuki Watase | January 3, 2020 | DDT New Year Special Gift! All Seats 2,000 Yen Box Office!! 2020 | Tokyo, Japan | 1 | <1 | This was a nine-person gauntlet battle royal also involving Saki Akai, Antonio Honda, Gorgeous Matsuno, Kazuki Hirata, Keigo Nakamura, Toru Owashi and Yuki Iino. | |
| 1460 | Kazuki Hirata | January 3, 2020 | DDT New Year Special Gift! All Seats 2,000 Yen Box Office!! 2020 | Tokyo, Japan | 30 | <1 | Took place during the same battle royal. | |
| 1461 | Saki Akai | January 3, 2020 | DDT New Year Special Gift! All Seats 2,000 Yen Box Office!! 2020 | Tokyo, Japan | 15 | 1 | Took place during the same battle royal. | |
| 1462 | Aja Kong | January 4, 2020 | Tokyo Joshi Pro '20 | Tokyo, Japan | 5 | <1 | | |
| 1463 | Saki Akai | January 4, 2020 | Tokyo Joshi Pro '20 | Tokyo, Japan | 16 | 1 | | |
| 1464 | Antonio Honda | January 5, 2020 | DDT New Year Dramatic Itabashi Series 2020 | Tokyo, Japan | 13 | <1 | | |
| 1465 | Saki Akai | January 5, 2020 | DDT New Year Dramatic Itabashi Series 2020 | Tokyo, Japan | 17 | 7 | | |
| 1466 | Rina Yamashita | January 12, 2020 | DDT Wrestle Shiokobu! 2020 | Osaka, Japan | 1 | <1 | | |
| 1467 | Kazuki Hirata | January 12, 2020 | DDT Wrestle Shiokobu! 2020 | Osaka, Japan | 31 | <1 | | |
| 1468 | Rina Yamashita | January 12, 2020 | DDT Wrestle Shiokobu! 2020 | Osaka, Japan | 2 | <1 | | |
| 1469 | Antonio Honda | January 12, 2020 | DDT Wrestle Shiokobu! 2020 | Osaka, Japan | 14 | <1 | | |
| 1470 | Yuni | January 12, 2020 | DDT Wrestle Shiokobu! 2020 | Osaka, Japan | 5 | 1 | | |
| 1471 | Yuki Ueno | January 13, 2020 | DDT Wrestle Tororokobu! 2020 | Osaka, Japan | 6 | <1 | | |
| 1472 | Kazuki Hirata | January 13, 2020 | DDT Wrestle Tororokobu! 2020 | Osaka, Japan | 32 | <1 | | |
| 1473 | Toru Owashi | January 13, 2020 | DDT Wrestle Tororokobu! 2020 | Osaka, Japan | 21 | 67 | | |
| 1474 | Masahiro Takanashi | March 20, 2020 | Judgement 2020: DDT 23rd Anniversary | Tokyo, Japan | 20 | <1 | | |
| 1475 | Hiroshi Yamato and Toru Owashi | March 20, 2020 | Judgement 2020: DDT 23rd Anniversary | Tokyo, Japan | 1 (1, 22) | <1 | | |
| 1476 | Mizuki Watase, Antonio Honda, Danshoku Dino and Yukio Naya | March 20, 2020 | Judgement 2020: DDT 23rd Anniversary | Tokyo, Japan | 1 (2, 15, 29, 1) | <1 | | |
| 1477 | Kazuki Hirata | March 20, 2020 | Judgement 2020: DDT 23rd Anniversary | Tokyo, Japan | 33 | <1 | | |
| 1478 | Toru Owashi | March 20, 2020 | Judgement 2020: DDT 23rd Anniversary | Tokyo, Japan | 23 | 23 | | |
| 1479 | Danshoku Dino | April 12, 2020 | The Fate of Ironman! | Tokyo, Japan | 30 | 62 | Took place during a pre-taped match parodying a fighting video game. | |
| 1480 | Antonio Honda | June 13, 2020 | DDT TV Show! #6 | Tokyo, Japan | 16 | <1 | | |
| 1481 | Danshoku Dino | June 13, 2020 | DDT TV Show! #6 | Tokyo, Japan | 31 | 7 | | |
| 1482 | Antonio Honda | June 20, 2020 | DDT TV Show! #7 | Tokyo, Japan | 17 | <1 | Took place during a 7-man delayed entry battle royale. | |
| 1483 | Danshoku Dino | June 20, 2020 | DDT TV Show! #7 | Tokyo, Japan | 32 | 22 | | |
| 1484 | Makoto Oishi | July 12, 2020 | Summer Itabashi Series 2020 | Tokyo, Japan | 26 | <1 | This was a three-way tag team match in which Danshoku Dino teamed up with Toru Owashi to take on the teams of Makoto Oishi and Mizuki Watase and All Out (Shunma Katsumata and Yuki Iino). Oishi pinned Dino to win the championship. | |
| 1485 | Yoshihiko | July 12, 2020 | Summer Itabashi Series 2020 | Tokyo, Japan | 16 | 13 | | |
| 1486 | Joey Janela | July 25, 2020 | GCW Homecoming Part 1 | Atlantic City, NJ | 2 | 8 | | |
| 1487 | A. C. H. | August 2, 2020 | GCW Keep In Touch | Indianapolis, IN | 1 | <1 | | |
| 1488 | Levi Everett | August 2, 2020 | GCW Keep In Touch | Indianapolis, IN | 1 | <1 | Indiana-based independent wrestler. Took place in ACH's locker room. | |
| 1489 | Tony Deppen | August 2, 2020 | GCW Keep In Touch | Indianapolis, IN | 1 | <1 | Took place at a gas station. | |
| 1490 | Nate Webb | August 2, 2020 | GCW Keep In Touch | Indianapolis, IN | 1 | 1 | Indiana-based independent wrestler. | |
| 1491 | Joey Janela | August 3, 2020 | N/A | Indianapolis, IN | 3 | 9 | Took place as Webb dropped off Janela at Indianapolis International Airport. | |
| 1492 | Dean Malenko | August 12, 2020 | N/A | Jacksonville, FL | 1 | 56 | Malenko forced Janela to submit. | |
| 1493 | Orange Cassidy | October 7, 2020 | N/A | Jacksonville, FL | 1 | 22 | Cassidy pinned Malenko while he was sleeping. This was also for Malenko's REW Pakistan 24/7 Championship. | |
| 1494 | Joey Janela | October 29, 2020 | N/A | Jacksonville, FL | 4 | 13 | Janela pinned Cassidy while he was sleeping. This was also for Cassidy's REW Pakistan 24/7 Championship. | |
| 1495 | Jungle Boy | November 10, 2020 | AEW Dark | Jacksonville, FL | 1 | 1 | Janela turned over both the Ironman Heavymetalweight Championship and the REW Pakistan 24/7 Championship to Jungle Boy the day after Jungle Boy pinned him on an episode of AEW Dark. | |
| 1496 | Marko Stunt | November 11, 2020 | N/A | Jacksonville, FL | 1 | <1 | Stunt pinned Jungle Boy for both the Ironman Heavymetalweight Championship and the REW Pakistan 24/7 Championship. | |
| 1497 | Britt Baker | November 11, 2020 | N/A | Jacksonville, FL | 1 | 36 | This was also for the REW Pakistan 24/7 Championship. | |
| 1498 | The Young Bucks' autobiography Killing the Business | December 16, 2020 | N/A | Jacksonville, FL | 1 | 74 | Baker fell asleep while reading the book and it fell on top of her. This was also for the REW Pakistan 24/7 Championship. | |
| 1499 | Saki Akai's photo book "Lip Hip Shake" | February 28, 2021 | Into The Fight 2021 | Tokyo, Japan | 1 | 14 | This was a five-way match also involving Akai, Antonio Honda, Danshoku Dino and Kazuki Hirata. The match was turned into a six-way when the photo book was introduced by Hirata. | |
| 1500 | Keigo Nakamura | March 14, 2021 | Day Dream Believer 2021 | Tokyo, Japan | 1 | <1 | Took place during a six-person tag team match. | |
| 1501 | Saki Akai | March 14, 2021 | Day Dream Believer 2021 | Tokyo, Japan | 18 | 20 | | |
| 1502 | Kazuki Hirata | April 3, 2021 | Peanuts Are A Good Source Of Protein 2021 | Chiba, Japan | 34 | <1 | | |
| 1503 | Chiba-kun Stuffed Animal | April 3, 2021 | Peanuts Are A Good Source Of Protein 2021 | Chiba, Japan | 1 | <1 | | |
| 1504 | Kazuki Hirata | April 3, 2021 | Peanuts Are A Good Source Of Protein 2021 | Chiba, Japan | 35 | <1 | | |
| 1505 | Antonio Honda | April 3, 2021 | Peanuts Are A Good Source Of Protein 2021 | Chiba, Japan | 18 | <1 | This was a six-man tag team match where Honda teamed up with Keigo Nakamura and Mao to defeat Kazuki Hirata, Saki Akai and Toru Owashi. Honda pinned Hirata to win the championship and the match. | |
| 1506 | Saki Akai | April 3, 2021 | Peanuts Are A Good Source Of Protein 2021 | Chiba, Japan | 19 | 22 | | |
| 1507 | Chris Brookes | April 25, 2021 | Max Bump 2021 Tour in Nagano | Nagano, Japan | 1 | <1 | Took place during a tag team match where Brookes and Toy Kojima defeated Akai and Yukio Sakaguchi. | |
| 1508 | Saki Akai | April 25, 2021 | Max Bump 2021 Tour in Nagano | Nagano, Japan | 20 | 9 | | |
| 1509 | Chris Brookes | May 4, 2021 | Max Bump 2021 | Tokyo, Japan | 2 | 25 | This was also for Brookes' DDT Extreme Division Championship. | |
| 1510 | Antonio Honda | May 29, 2021 | Audience Tour 2021 In Fukuoka | Fukuoka, Japan | 19 | <1 | | |
| 1511 | Saki Akai | May 29, 2021 | Audience Tour 2021 In Fukuoka | Fukuoka, Japan | 21 | 1 | | |
| 1512 | Shinya Aoki | May 30, 2021 | Audience Tour 2021 In Kumamoto | Kumamoto, Japan | 2 | 21 | | |
| 1513 | Kazuki Hirata | June 20, 2021 | King of DDT 2021 2nd Round | Tokyo, Japan | 36 | <1 | Took place during a 9-person rumble rules match also involving Yukio Sakaguchi, Antonio Honda, Chris Brookes, Mad Paulie, Makoto Oishi, Saki Akai and Toru Owashi. | |
| 1514 | Shinya Aoki | June 20, 2021 | King of DDT 2021 2nd Round | Tokyo, Japan | 3 | 35 | | |
| 1515 | Masayuki Okano | July 25, 2021 | Kushiro Charity Sports Festival | Kushiro, Japan | 1 | <1 | Retired football player. | |
| 1516 | Danshoku Dino | July 25, 2021 | Kushiro Charity Sports Festival | Kushiro, Japan | 33 | 49 | Dino changed his ring name to Danshoku "Dandy" Dino during this reign. | |
| 1517 | Shunma Katsumata | September 12, 2021 | Tenjin Wars 2021 | Fukuoka, Japan | 4 | 10 | Katsumata and Konosuke Takeshita successfully defended the KO-D Tag Team Championship against Dino and Yuki Iino. Katsumata pinned Dino to also win the Ironman title. | |
| 1518 | Harashima | September 22, 2021 | Who's Gonna TOP? 2021 Tour | Sapporo, Japan | 4 | 31 | Katsumata teamed up with Yuki Ueno and Konosuke Takeshita in a losing effort to Harashima, Toru Owashi and Naomi Yoshimura where Harashima pinned Katsumata to win the title. | |
| 1519 | Akito | October 23, 2021 | Dramatic Dream Tour 2021 in Fuji | Fuji, Japan | 4 | 18 | Akito pinned Harashima during Antonio Honda's autograph session. | |
| 1520 | Hideki Okatani | November 10, 2021 | D-Oh Grand Prix 2021 II in Shinjuku | Tokyo, Japan | 1 | <1 | Took place during a six-person tag team match. Okatani pinned his own partner Akito to win the title. | |
| 1521 | Kazuki Hirata | November 10, 2021 | D-Oh Grand Prix 2021 II in Shinjuku | Tokyo, Japan | 37 | <1 | Took place during a six-person tag team match. Hirata pinned Hideki Okatani to win the match and the title. | |
| 1522 | Toru Owashi | November 10, 2021 | D-Oh Grand Prix 2021 II in Shinjuku | Tokyo, Japan | 24 | 11 | | |
| 1523 | Akito | November 21, 2021 | D-Oh Grand Prix 2021 II in Korakuen Hall | Tokyo, Japan | 5 | 14 | | |
| 1524 | Kazuki Hirata | December 5, 2021 | D-Oh Grand Prix 2021 II the Final | Tokyo, Japan | 38 | <1 | | |
| 1525 | Toru Owashi | December 5, 2021 | D-Oh Grand Prix 2021 II the Final | Tokyo, Japan | 25 | 26 | | |
| 1526 | Yuna Mizumori | December 31, 2021 | ChocoPro #187 | Tokyo, Japan | 1 | <1 | Won via Janken (Rock-Paper-Scissors). | |
| 1527 | Toru Owashi | December 31, 2021 | ChocoPro #187 | Tokyo, Japan | 26 | 7 | | |
| 1528 | Mao | January 7, 2022 | DDT Free (January) | Tokyo, Japan | 3 | 30 | | |
| 1529 | 100,000 subscribers to DDT's official YouTube channel | February 6, 2022 | Ultimate Tag League 2022 in Numazu!! | Numazu, Japan | 1 | <1 | DDT Pro-Wrestling celebrated the milestone of 100,000 YouTube subscribers. The tablet on which this was shown pinned Mao and all the hundred thousand subscribers were considered champions. Took place at ringside. | |
| 1530 | Toru Owashi | February 6, 2022 | Ultimate Tag League 2022 in Numazu!! | Numazu, Japan | 27 | 8 | Owashi pinned the tablet at ringside. | |
| 1531 | Antonio Honda | February 14, 2022 | DDT Free February: Ultimate Tag League 2022 in Shinjuku!! | Tokyo, Japan | 20 | <1 | This was a five-way two-minute time-limit scramble match also involving Danshoku "Dandy" Dino, Masahiro Takanashi and Shunma Katsumata. | |
| 1532 | Danshoku "Dandy" Dino | February 14, 2022 | DDT Free February: Ultimate Tag League 2022 in Shinjuku!! | Tokyo, Japan | 34 | <1 | Took place in the same scramble match. Dino was previously known without his "Dandy" nickname. | |
| 1533 | Masahiro Takanashi | February 14, 2022 | DDT Free February: Ultimate Tag League 2022 in Shinjuku!! | Tokyo, Japan | 21 | <1 | Took place in the same scramble match. | |
| 1534 | Toru Owashi | February 14, 2022 | DDT Free February: Ultimate Tag League 2022 in Shinjuku!! | Tokyo, Japan | 28 | <1 | Took place in the same scramble match. | |
| 1535 | Antonio Honda | February 14, 2022 | DDT Free February: Ultimate Tag League 2022 in Shinjuku!! | Tokyo, Japan | 21 | <1 | Took place in the same scramble match. | |
| 1536 | Danshoku "Dandy" Dino | February 14, 2022 | DDT Free February: Ultimate Tag League 2022 in Shinjuku!! | Tokyo, Japan | 35 | <1 | Took place in the same scramble match. | |
| 1537 | Masahiro Takanashi | February 14, 2022 | DDT Free February: Ultimate Tag League 2022 in Shinjuku!! | Tokyo, Japan | 22 | <1 | Took place in the same scramble match. | |
| 1538 | Foot massage mat | February 14, 2022 | DDT Free February: Ultimate Tag League 2022 in Shinjuku!! | Tokyo, Japan | 1 | <1 | Took place in the same scramble match. | |
| 1539 | Antonio Honda | February 14, 2022 | DDT Free February: Ultimate Tag League 2022 in Shinjuku!! | Tokyo, Japan | 22 | <1 | Took place in the same scramble match. | |
| 1540 | Toru Owashi | February 14, 2022 | DDT Free February: Ultimate Tag League 2022 in Shinjuku!! | Tokyo, Japan | 29 | <1 | Took place in the same scramble match. | |
| 1541 | Masahiro Takanashi | February 14, 2022 | DDT Free February: Ultimate Tag League 2022 in Shinjuku!! | Tokyo, Japan | 23 | <1 | Took place in the same scramble match. | |
| 1542 | Shunma Katsumata | February 14, 2022 | DDT Free February: Ultimate Tag League 2022 in Shinjuku!! | Tokyo, Japan | 5 | <1 | Took place in the same scramble match. | |
| 1543 | Danshoku "Dandy" Dino | February 14, 2022 | DDT Free February: Ultimate Tag League 2022 in Shinjuku!! | Tokyo, Japan | 36 | <1 | Took place in the same scramble match. | |
| 1544 | Antonio Honda | February 14, 2022 | DDT Free February: Ultimate Tag League 2022 in Shinjuku!! | Tokyo, Japan | 23 | <1 | Took place in the same scramble match. Honda succeeded in defending the title for two full minutes to win the match. | |
| 1545 | Lingling | February 14, 2022 | DDT Free February: Ultimate Tag League 2022 in Shinjuku!! | Tokyo, Japan | 1 | 39 | Shook Honda's hand and crushed it to become the new champion. Lingling is part of the idol band Bish. | |
| 1546 | Apple | March 25, 2022 | Universe Bible | Tokyo, Japan | 1 | <1 | Took place during the final episode of Abema's Universe Bible. Lingling attempted to crush an apple with her hand but eventually "gave up". | |
| 1547 | Antonio Honda | March 25, 2022 | Universe Bible | Tokyo, Japan | 24 | 2 | Took place during the final episode of Abema's Universe Bible. Honda pinned the apple to win the title. | |
| 1548 | Shinichiro Kawamatsu | March 27, 2022 | Day Dream Believer 2022 | Tokyo, Japan | 1 | 66 | YouTuber and Tokyo Metropolitan Assemblyman. Kawamatsu pinned Antonio Honda after he had just successfully defended the title against Pokotan. | |
| 1549 | Kazuki Hirata | June 1, 2022 | What Are You Doing 2022 | Tokyo, Japan | 39 | <1 | This was an Ironman survival gauntlet battle royal also involving Nobutatsu Suzuki, Pokotan, Kazuki Hirata, Thanomsak Toba, Antonio Honda and Toru Owashi. Hirata eliminated Kawamatsu to become the new champion. | |
| 1550 | Toru Owashi | June 1, 2022 | What Are You Doing 2022 | Tokyo, Japan | 30 | 92 | Took place in the same battle royal. Owashi became champion after Hirata and Honda simultaneously eliminated each other. | |
| — | Vacated | September 1, 2022 | — | N/A | — | — | Owashi vacated the title to focus on his upcoming KO-D Tag Team Championship match. | |
| 1551 | Toru Owashi | September 10, 2022 | Konosuke Takeshita's 10th Anniversary | Osaka, Japan | 31 | <1 | This was a 14-person staggered entry battle royal also involving Akito, Danshoku Dino, El Unicorn, Ilusion, Kazuki Hirata, Makoto Oishi, Saki Akai, Soma Takao, Yuki Iino, Yuki Ishida, Yumehito Imanari, Yusuke Okada and Yuya Koroku for the vacant title. | |
| 1552 | Kazuki Hirata | September 10, 2022 | Konosuke Takeshita's 10th Anniversary | Osaka, Japan | 40 | <1 | | |
| 1553 | Keiko Takeshita | September 10, 2022 | Konosuke Takeshita's 10th Anniversary | Osaka, Japan | 1 | 63 | Konosuke Takeshita's mother. | |
| 1554 | Shunma Katsumata | November 12, 2022 | D-Oh Grand Prix 2022 in Osaka | Osaka, Japan | 6 | 1 | | |
| 1555 | Yukio Sakaguchi | November 13, 2022 | D-Oh Grand Prix 2022 in Kyoto | Kyoto, Japan | 7 | <1 | This was a six-man tag team match in which Katsumata teamed up with Aja Kong and Yuki Ueno, and Sakaguchi teamed up with Saki Akai and Harashima. | |
| 1556 | Saki Akai | November 13, 2022 | D-Oh Grand Prix 2022 in Kyoto | Kyoto, Japan | 22 | 9 | | |
| 1557 | Ram Kaicho | November 22, 2022 | Masahiro Takanashi Produce Bokutachi Yon Juku de Yon Aishimasu! 2022 | Tokyo, Japan | 2 | <1 | Aired on November 27, 2022. | |
| 1558 | Saki Akai | November 22, 2022 | Masahiro Takanashi Produce Bokutachi Yon Juku de Yon Aishimasu! 2022 | Tokyo, Japan | 23 | 88 | Aired on November 27, 2022. | |
| 1559 | Penelope Ford | February 18, 2023 | Friendship, Endeavour, Victory in Nagoya 2023 | Nagoya, Japan | 1 | 8 | | |
| 1560 | Kip Sabian | February 26, 2023 | Into The Fight 2023 | Tokyo, Japan | 1 | <1 | | |
| 1561 | Yoshihiko | February 26, 2023 | Into The Fight 2023 | Tokyo, Japan | 17 | 6 | | |
| 1562 | Kazuki Hirata | March 4, 2023 | DDT Yokohama Unlimited Vol. 2 | Yokohama, Japan | 41 | <1 | Took place during a 10-person rumble rules battle royale. | |
| 1563 | Akito | March 4, 2023 | DDT Yokohama Unlimited Vol. 2 | Yokohama, Japan | 6 | 20 | Took place during a 10-person rumble rules battle royale. | |
| 1564 | Yusuke Okada | March 24, 2023 | Dramatic Dream Tour 2023 | Tokyo, Japan | 1 | <1 | | |
| 1565 | Akito | March 24, 2023 | Dramatic Dream Tour 2023 | Tokyo, Japan | 7 | <1 | | |
| 1566 | Yoshihiko | March 24, 2023 | Dramatic Dream Tour 2023 | Tokyo, Japan | 18 | 6 | | |
| 1567 | Mao | March 30, 2023 | DDT Goes Hollywood! | Los Angeles, CA | 4 | <1 | Took place during a tag team match where Mao and Shunma Katsumata defeated Yoshihiko and Chris Brookes. | |
| 1568 | Chris Brookes | March 30, 2023 | DDT Goes Hollywood! | Los Angeles, CA | 3 | <1 | | |
| 1569 | Yoshihiko | March 30, 2023 | DDT Goes Hollywood! | Los Angeles, CA | 19 | 1 | | |
| 1570 | Cole Radrick | March 31, 2023 | GCW vs. DDT | Los Angeles, CA | 1 | <1 | | |
| 1571 | Yoshihiko | March 31, 2023 | GCW vs. DDT | Los Angeles, CA | 20 | 77 | | |
| 1572 | Sanshiro Takagi | June 16, 2023 | What Are You Doing 2023 Tour in Hakodate | Hakodate, Japan | 11 | 58 | | |
| 1573 | Naruki Doi | August 13, 2023 | Saki Akai 10th Anniversary Tour in Korakuen!! | Tokyo, Japan | 1 | 27 | Took place during a 8-person rumble rules match also involving Akito, Antonio Honda, Danshoku Dino, Harashima, Yuki Iino and Kazuma Sumi. | |
| 1574 | Naoki Tanizaki | September 8, 2023 | AJPW Giant Series 2023 | Tokyo, Japan | 2 | <1 | This was an All Japan Pro Wrestling event. | |
| 1575 | Naruki Doi | September 8, 2023 | AJPW Giant Series 2023 | Tokyo, Japan | 2 | 1 | This was an All Japan Pro Wrestling event. | |
| 1576 | Kazuki Hirata | September 9, 2023 | DDT Big Bang 2023 | Tokyo, Japan | 42 | 21 | This was a winner takes all match in which Hirata's DDT Extreme Championship was also on the line. | |
| 1577 | Mao | September 30, 2023 | Saki Akai 10th Anniversary & Final Countdown In Kyoto | Kyoto, Japan | 5 | <1 | This was a falls count anywhere match in which Hirata teamed up with Akito. Mao who teamed up with Yuki Ueno scored the pin over Hirata to win the title. | |
| 1578 | Saki Akai | September 30, 2023 | Saki Akai 10th Anniversary & Final Countdown In Kyoto | Kyoto, Japan | 24 | <1 | | |
| 1579 | Kazuki Hirata | September 30, 2023 | Saki Akai 10th Anniversary & Final Countdown In Kyoto | Kyoto, Japan | 43 | 4 | | |
| 1580 | Takeshi Masada | October 4, 2023 | God Bless DDT 2023 Tour in Shinjuku | Tokyo, Japan | 1 | 11 | This was a tag team match in which Masada was teaming with Kazumi Sumi while Kazuki Hirata was teaming with Makoto Oishi. Masada pinned Hirata to win the match and the title. | |
| 1581 | Mao | October 15, 2023 | God Bless DDT 2023 Tour in Sapporo | Sapporo, Japan | 6 | <1 | | |
| 1582 | Takeshi Masada | October 15, 2023 | God Bless DDT 2023 Tour in Sapporo | Sapporo, Japan | 2 | 7 | | |
| 1583 | Kazuki Hirata | October 22, 2023 | God Bless DDT 2023 | Tokyo, Japan | 44 | <1 | | |
| 1584 | Hiromu Takahashi | October 22, 2023 | God Bless DDT 2023 | Tokyo, Japan | 1 | 7 | | |
| 1585 | Yellow iPhone 14 | October 29, 2023 | N/A | Las Vegas, NV | 1 | <1 | Hiromu Takahashi was sleeping while holding his phone. | |
| 1586 | Sumie Sakai | October 29, 2023 | N/A | Las Vegas, NV | 1 | <1 | | |
| 1587 | Hiromu Takahashi | October 29, 2023 | N/A | Las Vegas, NV | 2 | 4 | | |
| 1588 | Taiji Ishimori | November 2, 2023 | Road to Power Struggle | Osaka, Japan | 1 | 2 | Pinned Takahashi backstage during an interview. This was a NJPW event. | |
| 1589 | Hiromu Takahashi | November 4, 2023 | Power Struggle | Osaka, Japan | 3 | 8 | This match was also for Takahashi's IWGP Junior Heavyweight Championship. This was a NJPW event. | |
| 1590 | IWGP Junior Heavyweight Championship belt | November 12, 2023 | Ultimate Party 2023 | Tokyo, Japan | 1 | <1 | After defending the title against Kazuki Hirata, Hiromu Takahashi laid in the ring with the IWGP Junior Heavyweight Championship belt on his chest; the referee counted this as a pinfall, making the IWGP belt the champion. | |
| 1591 | Kazuki Hirata | November 12, 2023 | Ultimate Party 2023 | Tokyo, Japan | 45 | 4 | Pinned Takahashi's belt while in the ring. | |
| 1592 | Mikami | November 16, 2023 | Get Alive 2023 Tour in Shinjuku | Tokyo, Japan | 12 | <1 | Pinned Kazuki Hirata during a Trivia King Deathmatch for Hirata's DDT Extreme Championship. | |
| 1593 | Kazuki Hirata | November 16, 2023 | Get Alive 2023 Tour in Shinjuku | Tokyo, Japan | 46 | 3 | Defeated Mikami in their Trivia King Deathmatch for Hirata's DDT Extreme Championship, thus regaigning the Ironman title. | |
| 1594 | Yuki Ueno | November 19, 2023 | Get Alive 2023 in Osaka | Osaka, Japan | 7 | <1 | Took place in a six-man tag team match in which Ueno was teaming with Chris Brookes and Kazusada Higuchi against Tetsuya Endo, Yukio Naya and Kazuki Hirata. | |
| 1595 | Mao | November 19, 2023 | Get Alive 2023 in Osaka | Osaka, Japan | 7 | <1 | | |
| 1596 | Great Koji | November 19, 2023 | Get Alive 2023 in Osaka | Osaka, Japan | 1 | 35 | | |
| 1597 | Poison Sawada Julie | December 24, 2023 | D-Oh Grand Prix 2023 in Korakuen Hall | Tokyo, Japan | 8 | <1 | Took place during a battle royal. | |
| 1598 | Toru Owashi | December 24, 2023 | D-Oh Grand Prix 2023 in Korakuen Hall | Tokyo, Japan | 32 | <1 | Took place during a battle royal. | |
| 1599 | Christmas tree | December 24, 2023 | D-Oh Grand Prix 2023 in Korakuen Hall | Tokyo, Japan | 1 | 10 | Kazuki Hirata attacked Owashi with a Christmas tree and pinned him, but the referee ruled that the Christmas tree had pinned Owashi and awarded it the championship. | |
| 1600 | Kuroshio Tokyo Japan | January 3, 2024 | D-Oh Grand Prix 2023 the Final | Tokyo, Japan | 1 | 4 | | |
| 1601 | Stefan | January 7, 2024 | Tono wa Goranshin: 1-ban Kinsei | Tokyo, Japan | 1 | <1 | Unagi Sayaka's stuffed dinosaur toy. Pinned Kuroshio Tokyo Japan backstage. This was an independent show produced by Unagi. | |
| 1602 | Unagi Sayaka | January 7, 2024 | Tono wa Goranshin: 1-ban Kinsei | Tokyo, Japan | 1 | 21 | Pinned Stefan who was brought in the ring by Itsuki Aoki. This was an independent show produced by Unagi. | |
| 1603 | Haruka Umesaki | January 28, 2024 | Diana | Kawasaki, Japan | 1 | <1 | Defeated Unagi in a match which was contested for Umesaki's World Woman Pro-Wrestling Diana World Championship. | |
| 1604 | Unagi Sayaka | January 28, 2024 | Diana | Kawasaki, Japan | 2 | 26 | Pinned Umesaki in the ring. | |
| 1605 | Minoru Fujita | February 23, 2024 | — | Yokohama, Japan | 1 | <1 | Pinned Unagi in the hallways of the Yokohama Radiant Hall after Ganbare Pro-Wrestling's GanPro 2024 Desire event. The title change was broadcast on Unagi's YouTube channel. | |
| 1606 | Unagi Sayaka | February 23, 2024 | — | Yokohama, Japan | 3 | 2 | Pinned Fujita in the hallways of a hotel. The title change was broadcast on Sayaka's YouTube channel. | |
| 1607 | Saki | February 25, 2024 | Lucha Fiesta | Tokyo, Japan | 1 | <1 | This was an event produced by CMLL Lady's Ring. | |
| 1608 | Hikari Shimizu | February 25, 2024 | Lucha Fiesta | Tokyo, Japan | 1 | <1 | Shimizu tickled Saki into submission. This was an event produced by CMLL Lady's Ring. | |
| 1609 | Makoto | February 25, 2024 | Lucha Fiesta | Tokyo, Japan | 1 | <1 | This was an event produced by CMLL Lady's Ring. | |
| 1610 | Mrs. Matsuzawa | February 25, 2024 | Lucha Fiesta | Tokyo, Japan | 1 | <1 | Makoto's manager. This was an event produced by CMLL Lady's Ring. | |
| 1611 | Unagi Sayaka | February 25, 2024 | Lucha Fiesta | Tokyo, Japan | 4 | 14 | This was an event produced by CMLL Lady's Ring. | |
| 1612 | Maya Yukihi | March 10, 2024 | Oz Academy Sweet Tears | Tokyo, Japan | 1 | <1 | This was a six-woman tag team match in which Unagi Sayaka teamed up with Itsuki Aoki and Momoka Hanazono against Ozaki-gun (Kakeru, Maya Yukihi and Saori Anou). Sayaka succumbed to Yukihi via pinfall. | |
| 1613 | Whip | March 10, 2024 | — | Tokyo, Japan | 1 | <1 | Unagi Sayaka pushed Yukihi's whip down so it could pin her for the title while she was sleeping backstage after the "Sweet Tears" event. | |
| 1614 | Momoka Hanazono | March 10, 2024 | — | Tokyo, Japan | 1 | <1 | Pinned Yukihi's whip after it was left unattended. | |
| 1615 | Unagi Sayaka | March 10, 2024 | — | Tokyo, Japan | 5 | 13 | Pinned Hanazono in an elevator. | |
| 1616 | Sparky Ballard | March 23, 2024 | Marvelous Coast | San Francisco, CA | 1 | <1 | West Coast Pro Wrestling referee. This was a West Coast Pro Wrestling event. | |
| 1617 | Ref Gil | March 23, 2024 | Marvelous Coast | San Francisco, CA | 1 | <1 | West Coast Pro Wrestling referee. This was a West Coast Pro Wrestling event. | |
| 1618 | Hyan | March 23, 2024 | Marvelous Coast | San Francisco, CA | 1 | <1 | This was a West Coast Pro Wrestling event. | |
| 1619 | Unagi Sayaka | March 23, 2024 | Marvelous Coast | San Francisco, CA | 6 | 6 | This was a West Coast Pro Wrestling event. | |
| 1620 | Unknown foreigner | March 29, 2024 | N/A | United States | 1 | <1 | On April 12, 2024, Unagi Sayaka revealed that she had lost the title to a stranger in the United States some time before her match against Janai Kai at MLW War Chamber 2024. | |
| 1621 | Unagi Sayaka | March 29, 2024 | N/A | United States | 7 | 16 | Unagi Sayaka then won the title back after her MLW match. | |
| 1622 | Punch Tahara | April 14, 2024 | Sendai Girls | Tokyo, Japan | 1 | <1 | Unagi Sayaka submitted to a hug by Sendai Girls' Pro Wrestling ring announcer and referee Punch Tahara. | |
| 1623 | Unagi Sayaka | April 14, 2024 | Sendai Girls | Tokyo, Japan | 8 | 5 | Pinned Tahara backstage. | |
| 1624 | Grilled eel | April 19, 2024 | — | Tokyo, Japan | 1 | <1 | Sanshiro Takagi strangled Sayaka with a store-bought packed grilled eel somewhere backstage. Sayaka tapped out to the item. | |
| 1625 | Unagi Sayaka | April 19, 2024 | — | Tokyo, Japan | 9 | 7 | Sayaka strangled Takagi with the same grilled eel during a press conference which the latter submitted to. Sayaka later ate the eel as a compensation. | |
| 1626 | Unagi Sanshiro | April 26, 2024 | DDT × Zeekstar Tokyo Special Event "DDZT" | Tokyo, Japan | 12 | <1 | Sanshiro Takagi dressed as Unagi Sayaka. | |
| 1627 | Unagi Sayaka | April 26, 2024 | DDT × Zeekstar Tokyo Special Event "DDZT" | Tokyo, Japan | 10 | <1 | Pinned Takagi after the match. | |
| 1628 | Unagi Sanshiro | April 26, 2024 | DDT × Zeekstar Tokyo Special Event "DDZT" | Tokyo, Japan | 13 | <1 | As Takagi and Unagi were making their way backstage, Takagi rolled up Unagi on the entrance ramp. | |
| 1629 | Zeestar | April 26, 2024 | DDT × Zeekstar Tokyo Special Event "DDZT" | Tokyo, Japan | 1 | <1 | Zeekstar Tokyo's mascot. DDT and the Zeekstar Tokyo handball team held a few challenges in the arena. Takagi, still in his Unagi costume, was encouraged to play in goal for a game of handball, where the Zeekstar team shot multiple balls at him, knocking him down. Zeestar took the opportunity to pin Takagi. | |
| 1630 | Pokotan | April 26, 2024 | DDT × Zeekstar Tokyo Special Event "DDZT" | Tokyo, Japan | 1 | 43 | DDT's mascot. | |
| 1631 | Ilusion | June 8, 2024 | What Are You Doing 2024 Tour in Kyoto | Kyoto, Japan | 1 | <1 | | |
| 1632 | To-y | June 8, 2024 | What Are You Doing 2024 Tour in Kyoto | Kyoto, Japan | 2 | <1 | He previously won the title as Great Koji. | |
| 1633 | Jun Akiyama | June 8, 2024 | What Are You Doing 2024 Tour in Kyoto | Kyoto, Japan | 4 | <1 | | |
| 1634 | Danshoku Dino | June 8, 2024 | What Are You Doing 2024 Tour in Kyoto | Kyoto, Japan | 37 | <1 | | |
| 1635 | To-y | June 8, 2024 | What Are You Doing 2024 Tour in Kyoto | Kyoto, Japan | 3 | <1 | This was a special six-man tag team match in which To-y teamed up with The37Kamiina stablemates Shunma Katsumata and Yuki Ueno to defeat D・O・A (Danshoku Dino, Jun Akiyama and Makoto Oishi). To-y pinned Dino to win the match and the title subsequently. | |
| 1636 | Kazuki Hirata | June 8, 2024 | N/A | Tokushima, Japan | 47 | 1 | Hirata pinned To-y in a hotel room after hitting him with a chop. The title change was shown on DDT's Twitter account. | |
| 1637 | Tsuruhimeka | June 9, 2024 | What Are You Doing 2024 Tour in Matsuyama | Matsuyama, Japan | 1 | <1 | This was a six-person tag team match in which Tsuruhimeka teamed up with Sanshiro Takagi and Akito to defeat Kazuki Hirata, Shunma Katsumata and Makoto Oishi. Tsuruhimeka pinned Hirata to win the match and the title subsequently. | |
| 1638 | Kazuki Hirata | June 9, 2024 | What Are You Doing 2024 Tour in Matsuyama | Matsuyama, Japan | 48 | <1 | Rolled Tsuruhimeka up in the ring. | |
| 1639 | Cutie Elly The Ehime | June 9, 2024 | What Are You Doing 2024 Tour in Matsuyama | Matsuyama, Japan | 1 | <1 | Promoter. Rolled Hirata up in the ring. | |
| 1640 | Chris Brookes | June 9, 2024 | What Are You Doing 2024 Tour in Matsuyama | Matsuyama, Japan | 4 | 2 | Rolled Ellie up in the ring. | |
| 1641 | Mao | June 11, 2024 | What Are You Doing 2024 Tour in Tokyo | Tokyo, Japan | 8 | <1 | This was a tag team match in which Brookes teamed up with Ilusion against The37Kamiina (Mao and To-y). Mao pinned Brooks to win the match and the title subsequently. | |
| 1642 | Ilusion | June 11, 2024 | What Are You Doing 2024 Tour in Tokyo | Tokyo, Japan | 2 | <1 | | |
| 1643 | Kazuma Sumi | June 11, 2024 | What Are You Doing 2024 Tour in Tokyo | Tokyo, Japan | 1 | 10 | | |
| 1644 | Shunma Katsumata | June 21, 2024 | Spa & Pool Aqua Yukari: Sauna Street Wrestling | Chiba, Japan | 7 | <1 | This was a five-way survival falls count anywhere match also involving Ilusion, To-y and Yukio Naya in which Katsumata's DDT Extreme Championship was also on the line. | |
| 1645 | Aufguss towel | June 21, 2024 | Spa & Pool Aqua Yukari: Sauna Street Wrestling | Chiba, Japan | 1 | <1 | Katsumata was resting in a room and covered himself with a towel. Keigo Nakamura brought a referee who sanctioned it as a pinfall. | |
| 1646 | Keigo Nakamura | June 21, 2024 | Spa & Pool Aqua Yukari: Sauna Street Wrestling | Chiba, Japan | 2 | 1 | Took the towel and submitted it by strangling in the same room. | |
| 1647 | Cima | June 22, 2024 | What Are You Doing 2024 Tour in Osaka | Osaka, Japan | 1 | 1 | | |
| 1648 | Whip (II) | June 23, 2024 | G Prowrestling Ver. 73 | Osaka, Japan | 1 | 5 | Michiko Miyagi attacked Cima backstage with a whip. Gamma carried her away while the whip remained on the chest of a beaten Cima who got pinned. This was a Gleat event. | |
| 1649 | Unagi Sayaka | June 28, 2024 | N/A | Tokyo, Japan | 11 | <1 | Pinned the whip while it was being interviewed by Lidet Entertainment President Hiroyuki Suzuki in the Lidet headquarters. | |
| 1650 | Stefan | June 28, 2024 | CMLL Lady's Ring | Tokyo, Japan | 2 | <1 | Unagi Sayaka's stuffed dinosaur toy. Pinned Unagi Sayaka backstage at a CMLL Lady's Ring event. | |
| 1651 | Mrs. Hanzawa of Mexico Tourism | June 28, 2024 | CMLL Lady's Ring | Tokyo, Japan | 1 | <1 | Hanzawa inadvertently sat on Stefan. | |
| 1652 | Tae Honma | June 28, 2024 | CMLL Lady's Ring | Tokyo, Japan | 1 | <1 | Honma tricked Mrs. Hanzawa into laying down for a massage then pinned her. | |
| 1653 | Mrs. Matsuzawa | June 28, 2024 | CMLL Lady's Ring | Tokyo, Japan | 2 | <1 | Makoto's manager. Pinned Honma backstage. | |
| 1654 | Yuna Manase | June 28, 2024 | CMLL Lady's Ring | Tokyo, Japan | 1 | <1 | | |
| 1655 | Unagi Sayaka | June 28, 2024 | CMLL Lady's Ring | Tokyo, Japan | 12 | 1 | | |
| 1656 | Towel | June 29, 2024 | Toden Wrestling | Tokyo, Japan | 1 | <1 | Took place on board the Tokyo Sakura Tram. Minoru Suzuki choked Unagi Sayaka with his towel. Suzuki's towel was recognized as champion despite Suzuki's protests. | |
| 1657 | Sugi-chan | June 29, 2024 | Toden Wrestling | Tokyo, Japan | 1 | <1 | Comedian. Took place on board the Tokyo Sakura Tram. | |
| 1658 | Towel | June 29, 2024 | Toden Wrestling | Tokyo, Japan | 2 | <1 | Took place on board the Tokyo Sakura Tram. Minoru Suzuki choked Sugi-chan with his towel. Suzuki's towel was again recognized as champion. | |
| 1659 | Funky Kato | June 29, 2024 | Toden Wrestling | Tokyo, Japan | 1 | 10 | Musician. Took place on board the Tokyo Sakura Tram. | |
| 1660 | Danshoku Dino | July 9, 2024 | — | N/A | 38 | 10 | | |
| 1661 | Sanshiro Takagi | July 19, 2024 | — | Tokyo, Japan | 14 | 1 | Pinned Dino at the Wrestle Peter Pan 2024 press conference. | |
| 1662 | Danshoku Dino | July 20, 2024 | — | Tokyo, Japan | 39 | 7 | Pinned Takagi at a public press conference | |
| 1663 | Antonio Honda | July 27, 2024 | After Peter Pan 2024 in Nagoya | Nagoya, Japan | 25 | <1 | | |
| 1664 | Danshoku Dino | July 27, 2024 | After Peter Pan 2024 in Nagoya | Nagoya, Japan | 40 | 19 | | |
| 1665 | Joey Janela | August 15, 2024 | Fighting Beer Garden 2024 in Shinjuku | Tokyo, Japan | 5 | <1 | This was a tag team match in which Janela teamed with Takeshi Masada, while Danshoku Dino teamed with Effy. | |
| 1666 | Effy | August 15, 2024 | Fighting Beer Garden 2024 in Shinjuku | Tokyo, Japan | 1 | <1 | | |
| 1667 | Danshoku Dino | August 15, 2024 | Fighting Beer Garden 2024 in Shinjuku | Tokyo, Japan | 41 | 26 | | |
| 1668 | To-y | September 10, 2024 | No Spoilers × Beer Garden Pro-Wrestling in Ueno | Tokyo, Japan | 4 | <1 | This was a six-man tag team match in which To-y teamed up with The37Kamiina original stablemates Shunma Katsumata and Yuki Ueno to defeat the team of Danshoku Dino, Takayuki Ueki and Keizo Matsuda. To-y pinned Dino to win the match and the title subsequently. Aired on tape delay on September 13, 2024. | |
| 1669 | Danshoku Dino | September 10, 2024 | No Spoilers × Beer Garden Pro-Wrestling in Ueno | Tokyo, Japan | 42 | 6 | Aired on tape delay on September 13, 2024. | |
| 1670 | Chris Brookes | September 15, 2024 | Dramatic Infinity 2024 Tour in Sapporo: Day 1 | Sapporo, Japan | 5 | 1 | This was a six-man tag team match in which Brookes teamed up with Ilusion and Akito to defeat Dino, Jun Akiyama and Tomoya. Brookes pinned Dino to win the match and the title subsequently. Aired on tape delay on September 18, 2024. | |
| 1671 | Danshoku Dino | September 16, 2024 | Dramatic Infinity 2024 Tour in Sapporo: Day 2 | Sapporo, Japan | 43 | 7 | | |
| 1672 | Shunma Katsumata | September 23, 2024 | Rembrandt Lariat Series 2024 Comeback: Battle of the Coral | Tokyo, Japan | 8 | <1 | | |
| 1673 | Danshoku Dino | September 23, 2024 | Rembrandt Lariat Series 2024 Comeback: Battle of the Coral | Tokyo, Japan | 44 | 6 | | |
| 1674 | Makoto Oishi | September 29, 2024 | Dramatic Infinity 2024 | Tokyo, Japan | 27 | <1 | | |
| 1675 | Danshoku Dino | September 29, 2024 | Dramatic Infinity 2024 | Tokyo, Japan | 45 | 15 | | |
| 1676 | Shunma Katsumata | October 14, 2024 | Yuki Ishida Triumphant Homecoming! God Bless DDT 2024 Tour in Kumamoto | Kumamoto, Japan | 9 | <1 | This was a tag team match in which Katsumata teamed with Keigo Nakamura against Danshoku Dino and Soma Takao. | |
| 1677 | Kazuki Hirata | October 14, 2024 | Yuki Ishida Triumphant Homecoming! God Bless DDT 2024 Tour in Kumamoto | Kumamoto, Japan | 49 | 3 | | |
| 1678 | Danshoku Dino | October 17, 2024 | 2024 Final Beer Garden Pro-Wrestling | Tokyo, Japan | 46 | <1 | | |
| 1679 | Kazuki Hirata | October 17, 2024 | 2024 Final Beer Garden Pro-Wrestling | Tokyo, Japan | 50 | 2 | This was a 7-on-6 handicap match in which Hirata teamed with Harashima, To-y, Yuya Koroku, Yuki Ishida and Kazumi Sumi against Danshoku Dino, Akito, Soma Takao, Toru Owashi, Thanomsak Toba, Yukio Naya and Gota Ihashi. | |
| 1680 | Yuki Iino | October 19, 2024 | DDT Pro-Wrestling in Ikebukuro Full Moon Festival | Tokyo, Japan | 1 | <1 | This was a tag team match in which Iino teamed with Tetsuya Endo against Kazuki Hirata and Soma Takao. | |
| 1681 | Kazuki Hirata | October 19, 2024 | DDT Pro-Wrestling in Ikebukuro Full Moon Festival | Tokyo, Japan | 51 | 1 | | |
| 1682 | Yuni | October 20, 2024 | God Bless DDT 2024 | Tokyo, Japan | 6 | <1 | This was a tag team match in which Yuni teamed with Kazuma Sumi against Kazuki Hirata and Super Sasadango Machine. | |
| 1683 | Danshoku Dino | October 20, 2024 | God Bless DDT 2024 | Tokyo, Japan | 47 | 10 | | |
| 1684 | Kazuki Hirata | October 30, 2024 | Adult Resort Pro-Wrestling in Kiranah Garden Toyosu | Tokyo, Japan | 52 | <1 | | |
| 1685 | Danshoku Dino | October 30, 2024 | Adult Resort Pro-Wrestling in Kiranah Garden Toyosu | Tokyo, Japan | 48 | 5 | | |
| 1686 | Yuki Ueno | November 4, 2024 | Sumida Dramatic Dream! | Tokyo, Japan | 8 | <1 | | |
| 1687 | Super Sasadango Machine | November 4, 2024 | Sumida Dramatic Dream! | Tokyo, Japan | 11 | <1 | This was a six-man tag team two-out-of-three falls match in which Sasadango teamed with Danshoku Dino and Harashima against The37Kamiina (Yuki Ueno, Shunma Katsumata and To-y). Although this pinfall didn't count towards the two-out-of-three falls match since Ueno wasn't the legal man, it still counted as an Ironman Heavymetalweight title change. | |
| 1688 | Shunma Katsumata | November 4, 2024 | Sumida Dramatic Dream! | Tokyo, Japan | 10 | <1 | This was a six-man tag team two-out-of-three falls match. | |
| 1689 | Yuni | November 4, 2024 | Sumida Dramatic Dream! | Tokyo, Japan | 7 | 4 | | |
| 1690 | Danshoku Dino | November 8, 2024 | — | Narita, Japan | 49 | 1 | Dino pinned Yuni while he was sleeping at Narita Airport, waiting to leave for the Seattle events co-produced with Defy Wrestling. | |
| 1691 | Randy Myers | November 9, 2024 | DDT×Defy: DDT In Utero | Seattle, WA | 1 | <1 | Canda-based independent wrestler | |
| 1692 | Danshoku Dino | November 9, 2024 | DDT×Defy: DDT In Utero | Seattle, WA | 50 | <1 | | |
| 1693 | Yoshihiko | November 9, 2024 | DDT×Defy: DDT In Utero | Seattle, WA | 21 | 7 | | |
| 1694 | Kazuma Sumi | November 16, 2024 | Get Alive 2024 Tour in Yokohama | Yokohama, Japan | 2 | <1 | | |
| 1695 | Kazuki Hirata | November 16, 2024 | Get Alive 2024 Tour in Yokohama | Yokohama, Japan | 53 | <1 | This was a tag team match in which Hirata teamed with Danshoku Dino against Soma Takao and Kazumi Sumi. | |
| 1696 | Yuki Ueno | November 16, 2024 | Get Alive 2024 Tour in Yokohama | Yokohama, Japan | 9 | <1 | | |
| 1697 | Kazuki Hirata | November 16, 2024 | Get Alive 2024 Tour in Yokohama | Yokohama, Japan | 54 | 4 | Pinned Yuki Ueno backstage during the autograph signing session. | |
| 1698 | Yuki Ueno | November 20, 2024 | — | Tokyo, Japan | 10 | 3 | Choked Kazuki Hirata while he was out fishing in Toyosu. | |
| 1699 | Kazuki Hirata | November 23, 2024 | Get Alive 2024 | Tokyo, Japan | 55 | <1 | Pinned Yuki Ueno backstage before the event. | |
| 1700 | Yoshihiko | November 23, 2024 | Get Alive 2024 | Tokyo, Japan | 22 | 35 | This was a 6-on-1 handicap match in which Yoshihiko teamed with Toru Owashi, Antonio Honda, Soma Takao, Diego and Yuki Ishida against Kazuki Hirata. | |
| 1701 | Makoto Oishi | December 28, 2024 | Ultimate Party 2024 | Tokyo, Japan | 28 | <1 | Pinned Yoshihiko backstage before the start of the show. | |
| 1702 | Harashima | December 28, 2024 | Ultimate Party 2024 | Tokyo, Japan | 5 | <1 | Pinned Makoto Oishi backstage before the start of the show. | |
| 1703 | Kazuki Hirata | December 28, 2024 | Ultimate Party 2024 | Tokyo, Japan | 56 | <1 | Knocked Harashima out during his backstage interview at the end of the show. | |
| 1704 | Sanshiro Takagi | December 28, 2024 | Ultimate Party 2024 | Tokyo, Japan | 15 | 6 | Pinned Kazuki Hirata in a bathtub backstage at the end of the show. | |
| 1705 | Chris Harrington | January 3, 2025 | New Year☆Dramatic Parade 2025: Answer Will Be Given in a Year | Tokyo, Japan | 1 | 1 | Senior Vice President of Business Strategy at All Elite Wrestling. | |
| 1706 | Bryce Remsburg | January 4, 2025 | Tokyo Joshi Pro-Wrestling '25 | Tokyo, Japan | 1 | <1 | All Elite Wrestling referee. This was a Tokyo Joshi Pro-Wrestling event. | |
| 1707 | Poison Sawada Julie | January 4, 2025 | Tokyo Joshi Pro-Wrestling '25 | Tokyo, Japan | 9 | 14 | This was a Tokyo Joshi Pro-Wrestling event. | |
| 1708 | Tetsu Inada | January 18, 2025 | The Fortune Battle 2025 | Tokyo, Japan | 1 | 15 | A voice actor. | |
| 1709 | Tomoyuki Kurokawa | February 2, 2025 | N/A | Tokyo, Japan | 1 | <1 | Anime director. | |
| 1710 | Towel | February 2, 2025 | N/A | Tokyo, Japan | 3 | <1 | | |
| 1711 | Tetsu Inada | February 2, 2025 | N/A | Tokyo, Japan | 2 | 2 | A voice actor. | |
| 1712 | Shun Ebato | February 4, 2025 (NET) | Say You to Yo Asobi | Tokyo, Japan | 1 | N/A | Assistant director of Abema. Pre-recorded between February 4–14; aired between February 24–28. | |
| 1713 | Tetsu Inada | February 2025 | Say You to Yo Asobi | Tokyo, Japan | 3 | N/A | A voice actor. Pre-recorded between February 4–14; aired between February 24–28. | |
| 1714 | Tomoko Kaneda | February 2025 | Say You to Yo Asobi | Tokyo, Japan | 1 | N/A | A voice actress. Won the title in a game of janken. Pre-recorded between February 4–14; aired between February 24–28. | |
| 1715 | Tetsu Inada | February 2025 | Say You to Yo Asobi | Tokyo, Japan | 4 | N/A | A voice actor. Won the title in a balloon blowing contest. Pre-recorded between February 4–14; aired between February 24–28. | |
| 1716 | Tasuku Hatanaka | February 2025 | Say You to Yo Asobi | Tokyo, Japan | 1 | N/A | A voice actor. Won the title in a pencil balancing contest. Pre-recorded between February 4–14; aired between February 24–28. | |
| 1717 | Tomoko Kaneda | February 2025 | Say You to Yo Asobi | Tokyo, Japan | 2 | N/A | A voice actress. Won the title in a quick fart contest. Pre-recorded between February 4–14; aired between February 24–28. | |
| 1718 | Tetsu Inada | February 2025 | Say You to Yo Asobi | Tokyo, Japan | 5 | N/A | A voice actor. Won the title in a loud noise contest. Pre-recorded between February 4–14; aired between February 24–28. | |
| 1719 | Tasuku Hatanaka | February 2025 | Say You to Yo Asobi | Tokyo, Japan | 2 | N/A | A voice actor. Won the title in a karaoke contest. Pre-recorded between February 4–14; aired between February 24–28. | |
| 1720 | Tomoko Kaneda | February 2025 | Say You to Yo Asobi | Tokyo, Japan | 3 | N/A | A voice actress. Won the title in a fast cola drinking contest. Pre-recorded between February 4–14; aired between February 24–28. | |
| 1721 | Sobie | February 2025 | Say You to Yo Asobi | Tokyo, Japan | 1 | N/A | The program's mascot. Won the title in a back sumo match. Pre-recorded between February 4–14; aired between February 24–28. | |
| 1722 | Tasuku Hatanaka | February 2025 | Say You to Yo Asobi | Tokyo, Japan | 3 | N/A | A voice actor. Won the title in a side-step stamina test. Pre-recorded between February 4–14; aired between February 24–28. | |
| 1723 | Tetsu Inada | February 2025 | Say You to Yo Asobi | Tokyo, Japan | 6 | N/A | A voice actor. Won the title in a fast cola drinking contest. Pre-recorded between February 4–14; aired between February 24–28. | |
| 1724 | Tasuku Hatanaka | February 2025 | Say You to Yo Asobi | Tokyo, Japan | 4 | N/A | A voice actor. Won the title in a skipping rope contest. Pre-recorded between February 4–14; aired between February 24–28. | |
| 1725 | Tomoko Kaneda | February 2025 | Say You to Yo Asobi | Tokyo, Japan | 4 | N/A | A voice actress. Won the title in a back sumo match. Pre-recorded between February 4–14; aired between February 24–28. | |
| 1726 | Tetsu Inada | February 2025 | Say You to Yo Asobi | Tokyo, Japan | 7 | N/A | A voice actor. Won the title in a golden ball lifting contest. Pre-recorded between February 4–14; aired between February 24–28. | |
| 1727 | Tomoko Kaneda | February 2025 | Say You to Yo Asobi | Tokyo, Japan | 5 | N/A | A voice actress. Won the title in a quick fart contest. Pre-recorded between February 4–14; aired between February 24–28. | |
| 1728 | Tetsu Inada | February 2025 | Say You to Yo Asobi | Tokyo, Japan | 8 | N/A | A voice actor. Won the title in a balloon blowing contest. Pre-recorded between February 4–14; aired between February 24–28. | |
| 1729 | Shun Ebato | February 2025 | Say You to Yo Asobi | Tokyo, Japan | 2 | N/A | Assistant director of Abema. Won the title in a fast cola drinking contest. Pre-recorded between February 4–14; aired between February 24–28. | |
| 1730 | Tetsu Inada | February 14, 2025 (NLT) | Say You to Yo Asobi | Tokyo, Japan | 9 | 1 | A voice actor. Pre-recorded between February 4–14; aired between February 24–28. | |
| 1731 | Raku | February 15, 2025 | Shinkansen Joshi Pro-Wrestling | N/A | 1 | <1 | This was a TJPW event on board the Shinkansen; title changed hands somewhere between Nagoya and Shin-Ōsaka. | |
| 1732 | Miyu Yamashita | February 15, 2025 | TJPW 2025 Winter Fes. "West" | Osaka, Japan | 4 | <1 | This was an eight-woman tag team match in which Yamashita teamed up with Maki Itoh, Max the Impaler and Yuki Arai to defeat Mizuki, Aja Kong, Miu Watanabe, and Raku. Yamashita pinned Raku to win the match and the title. | |
| 1733 | Mecha Fist | February 15, 2025 | TJPW 2025 Winter Fes. "West" | Osaka, Japan | 1 | <1 | Sanshiro Takagi's weapon. Tetsu Inada threw the fist at Yamashita backstage, which covered her and subsequently won the title. | |
| 1734 | Tetsu Inada | February 15, 2025 | TJPW 2025 Winter Fes. "West" | Osaka, Japan | 10 | 8 | | |
| 1735 | Shunma Katsumata | February 23, 2025 | N/A | Tokyo, Japan | 11 | 7 | | |
| 1736 | To-y | March 2, 2025 | Naraha Town Self-Proclaimed Ambassador To-y's Thanksgiving Season 2 | Naraha, Japan | 4 | 4 | | |
| 1737 | Shunma Katsumata | March 6, 2025 | DDT Meet & Greet & Fight March | Tokyo, Japan | 12 | 26 | | |
| 1738 | Yuni | April 1, 2025 | No Spoiler Show vol. 3 in Ueno | Tokyo, Japan | 8 | 2 | This was a six-man tag team match pitting Mao and Makoto Oishi from NωA against Yuni and Kazuma Sumi from NωA Jr. and with Shunma Katsumata teaming with both teams at the same time. | |
| 1739 | Kazuma Sumi | April 3, 2025 | DDT Meet & Greet & Fight April | Tokyo, Japan | 3 | <1 | | |
| 1740 | Yuni | April 3, 2025 | DDT Meet & Greet & Fight April | Tokyo, Japan | 9 | <1 | | |
| 1741 | Shunma Katsumata | April 3, 2025 | DDT Meet & Greet & Fight April | Tokyo, Japan | 13 | 9 | | |
| 1742 | Kazuki Hirata | April 12, 2025 | Mentai Wars | Fukuoka, Japan | 57 | 7 | | |
| 1743 | Pokotan | April 19, 2025 | Uras Vegas Series: Sun and Moon | Tokyo, Japan | 2 | <1 | | |
| 1744 | Masanori Kishigawa and Mizuki Takashima | April 19, 2025 | Uras Vegas Series: Sun and Moon | Tokyo, Japan | 1 | 1 | Mikoshi, the mascot of Kanda Shrine, attacked Pokotan. Kishigawa and Takashima, two junior priests of the shrine simultaneously pinned Pokotan to win the title. | |
| 1745 | Kazuki Hirata | April 20, 2025 | Uras Vegas Series: God | Tokyo, Japan | 58 | <1 | Hirata pinned both Kishikawa and Takashima to win the title. | |
| 1746 | Sumire Uesaka | April 20, 2025 | Uras Vegas Series: God | Tokyo, Japan | 1 | <1 | A voice actress. | |
| 1747 | Pokotan's head | April 20, 2025 | Uras Vegas Series: God | Tokyo, Japan | 1 | 41 | Pokotan placed its head over Uesaka's, who was scared and tapped out. Referee Yukinori Matsui judged the head as the new champion. | |
| 1748 | Poison Sawada Julie | May 31, 2025 | Dramatic Dream Takashimaya Vol. 3 | Tokyo, Japan | 10 | 29 | | |
| 1749 | Sanshiro Takagi | June 29, 2025 | DDT King of Kings | Tokyo, Japan | 16 | 6 | | |
| 1750 | Riara | July 5, 2025 | I Can't Wait Until Summer Sun Princess '25 | Tokyo, Japan | 1 | <1 | Took place backstage at a Tokyo Joshi Pro Wrestling event. | |
| 1751 | Yoshiko Hasegawa | July 5, 2025 | I Can't Wait Until Summer Sun Princess '25 | Tokyo, Japan | 1 | 3 | This was a Tokyo Joshi Pro Wrestling event where Hasegawa teamed with Kaya Toribami to defeat Riara and Himawari. | |
| 1752 | Suzume | July 8, 2025 | Yoshiko Hasegawa Graduation - NonfictioN | Tokyo, Japan | 1 | <1 | This was a Tokyo Joshi Pro Wrestling event where Yoshiko Hasegawa defended the title in a 27-on-1 handicap match which also represented her official retirement bout. Suzume pinned Hasegawa to win the title. | |
| 1753 | Miu Watanabe | July 8, 2025 | Yoshiko Hasegawa Graduation - NonfictioN | Tokyo, Japan | 1 | <1 | Pinned Suzume during the same bout. | |
| 1754 | Mizuki | July 8, 2025 | Yoshiko Hasegawa Graduation - NonfictioN | Tokyo, Japan | 2 | <1 | Pinned Watanabe during the same bout. | |
| 1755 | Pico Pico Hammer | July 8, 2025 | Yoshiko Hasegawa Graduation - NonfictioN | Tokyo, Japan | 1 | <1 | A plastic hammer decoration toy. Raku knocked both herself and Mizuki out and the hammer fell on top of Mizuki. | |
| 1756 | Sanshiro Takagi | July 8, 2025 | Yoshiko Hasegawa Graduation - NonfictioN | Tokyo, Japan | 17 | 12 | Pinned the hammer decoration toy backstage after kicking it off the referee's hand. The title change took place after the event ended. | |
| 1757 | Kazuma Sumi | July 20, 2025 | DDT Handmade In Japan FES 2025 | Tokyo, Japan | 4 | 2 | | |
| 1758 | Yuni | July 22, 2025 | N/A | Tokyo, Japan | 10 | 4 | | |
| 1759 | Kazuma Sumi | July 26, 2025 | Galafest DASH!! | Tokyo, Japan | 5 | <1 | Took place at the Galafest music festival. | |
| 1760 | Shunma Katsumata | July 26, 2025 | Galafest DASH!! | Tokyo, Japan | 14 | <1 | Took place at the Galafest music festival. | |
| 1761 | Reni Takagi | July 26, 2025 | Galafest DASH!! | Tokyo, Japan | 1 | <1 | Member of idol group Momoiro Clover Z. Took place at the Galafest music festival. | |
| 1762 | Juri Suzue | July 26, 2025 | Galafest DASH!! | Tokyo, Japan | 1 | 28 | Star Planet trainee. Took place at the Galafest music festival. | |
| 1763 | Ram Kaicho | August 23, 2025 | Tokyo Princess Cup 2025 Finals | Tokyo, Japan | 3 | <1 | This was a Tokyo Joshi Pro-Wrestling event. Pinned Suzue before an eight-woman battle royal. | |
| 1764 | Mahiro Kiryu | August 23, 2025 | Tokyo Princess Cup 2025 Finals | Tokyo, Japan | 1 | <1 | Took place during an eight-woman battle royal. Kiryu pinned Kaicho to eliminate her and win the title subsequently. | |
| 1765 | Juri Suzue | August 23, 2025 | Tokyo Princess Cup 2025 Finals | Tokyo, Japan | 2 | <1 | Took place during an eight-woman battle royal. Won the bout and subsequently the title by last eliminating Miyu Yamashita and Raku simultaneously. | |
| 1766 | Pokotan | August 23, 2025 | Tokyo Princess Cup 2025 Finals | Tokyo, Japan | 3 | 28 | Mascot of DDT. Pinned Suzue backstage. | |
| 1767 | Raku's pillow | September 20, 2025 | Wrestle Princess VI | Tokyo, Japan | 1 | <1 | This was a Tokyo Joshi Pro-Wrestling event. Took place during an eight-person battle royal. Raku "knocked Pokotan out" by smothering it with her pillow. | |
| 1768 | Mahiro Kiryu | September 20, 2025 | Wrestle Princess VI | Tokyo, Japan | 2 | 7 | Took place during the same battle royal. | |
| 1769 | Haruna Neko | September 27, 2025 | Autumn Victory in Shin-Kiba | Tokyo, Japan | 1 | <1 | This was a Tokyo Joshi Pro-Wrestling event. Haruna Neko pinned Kiryu during her own official retirement ceremony. | |
| 1770 | Mahiro Kiryu | September 27, 2025 | Autumn Victory in Shin-Kiba | Tokyo, Japan | 3 | 7 | Haruna Neko surrendered the championship back to Kiryu immediately afterward. | |
| 1771 | Miyu Yamashita | October 4, 2025 | Autumn Victory in Shinagawa | Tokyo, Japan | 5 | <1 | This was a Tokyo Joshi Pro-Wrestling event. Yamashita pinned Kiryu while they were on opposite sides of a six-woman tag team match. | |
| 1772 | Mahiro Kiryu | October 4, 2025 | Autumn Victory in Shinagawa | Tokyo, Japan | 4 | 4 | Pinned Yamashita during the same event, after the match. | |
| 1773 | Mahiro Kiryu's Halloween portrait purchaser list | October 8, 2025 | N/A | Tokyo, Japan | 1 | <1 | Took place at an online autograph signing. | |
| 1774 | Mahiro Kiryu | October 8, 2025 | N/A | Tokyo, Japan | 5 | 4 | Shredded the paper list. | |
| 1775 | Contract Signing Document for International Princess Championship | October 12, 2025 | Autumn Victory in Shinjuku vol.1 | Tokyo, Japan | 1 | <1 | This was a Tokyo Joshi Pro-Wrestling event. Kiryu was pinned by the document during a singles match with Miyu Yamashita. | |
| 1776 | Rise Shirai's binder | October 12, 2025 | Autumn Victory in Shinjuku vol.1 | Tokyo, Japan | 1 | <1 | Pinfall occurred backstage after the event. | |
| 1777 | Double Vitamin Drink | October 12, 2025 | Autumn Victory in Shinjuku vol.1 | Tokyo, Japan | 1 | <1 | Pinfall occurred backstage after the event. | |
| 1778 | Mahiro Kiryu | October 12, 2025 | Autumn Victory in Shinjuku vol.1 | Tokyo, Japan | 6 | 14 | Kiryu wins after drinking the champion. Occurred backstage after the event. | |
| 1779 | Rika Tatsumi | October 26, 2025 | Autumn Victory in Ryogoku | Tokyo, Japan | 2 | 13 | This was a Tokyo Joshi Pro-Wrestling event. Tatsumi pinned Kiryu while they were on same side of a two-woman tag team match. | |
| 1780 | Let's Play Baseball! Shohei Ohtani Story 2025 Special Edition picture book | November 8, 2025 | N/A | Tokyo, Japan | 1 | <1 | This occurred at a Book House Cafe. Tatsumi fell asleep holding Shohei Ohtani's picture book in her arms. A referee emerged from nowhere and scored the pin, rendering the book as the new champion. | |
| 1781 | Rika Tatsumi | November 8, 2025 | N/A | Tokyo, Japan | 3 | 1 | This occurred at a Book House Cafe. Tatsumi reclaimed the title by finishing reading the book. | |
| 1782 | Mahiro Kiryu | November 9, 2025 | All Rise '25 | Tokyo, Japan | 7 | 8 | This was a Tokyo Joshi Pro-Wrestling (TJPW) event. Took place backstage. | |
| 1783 | Shinji Torigoe | November 17, 2025 | N/A | Tokyo, Japan | 1 | <1 | A professional mahjong player. Won in a mahjong game against Kiryu, Danshoku Dino, and Ken Ohka. | |
| 1784 | Ken Ohka's tank top | November 17, 2025 | N/A | Tokyo, Japan | 1 | <1 | After the mahjong game above, Ohka choked Torigoe with his tank top; the referee judged the item of clothing as the new champion. | |
| 1785 | Mahiro Kiryu | November 17, 2025 | N/A | Tokyo, Japan | 8 | 5 | | |
| 1786 | Rika Tatsumi | November 22, 2025 | Hyakumangoku Smile In Kanazawa ~ Uta Takami Homecoming Show ~ | Kanazawa, Japan | 4 | 15 | This was a Tokyo Joshi Pro-Wrestling (TJPW) event. Mahiro Kiryu teamed up with Hyper Misao and Kaya Toribami in a losing effort against Pom Harajuku, Raku and Rika Tatsumi. Tatsumi pinned Kiryu to win the match and the title subsequently. | |
| 1787 | Mahiro Kiryu | December 7, 2025 | TJPW x Ocha Norma: Ocha Pro Korakuen | Tokyo, Japan | 9 | <1 | This was a Tokyo Joshi Pro-Wrestling (TJPW) event. Tatsumi tried to allow Natsume Nakayama of Ocha Norma to pin her, but Kiryu took the opportunity instead. | |
| 1788 | Natsume Nakayama | December 7, 2025 | TJPW x Ocha Norma: Ocha Pro Korakuen | Tokyo, Japan | 1 | <1 | An idol and member of Ocha Norma. Tatsumi choked Kiryu out and placed Nakayama on top of her. | |
| 1789 | Tea | December 7, 2025 | TJPW x Ocha Norma: Ocha Pro Korakuen | Tokyo, Japan | 1 | <1 | Took place backstage. Nakayama attempted to give up the title with a tea drink nearby; the referee interpreted this as her submitting to the tea. | |
| 1790 | Mahiro Kiryu | December 7, 2025 | TJPW x Ocha Norma: Ocha Pro Korakuen | Tokyo, Japan | 10 | 20 | Took place backstage. Kiryu won by drinking the champion. | |
| 1791 | Rika Tatsumi | December 27, 2025 | Year-End Party 2025 | Tokyo, Japan | 5 | <1 | This was a Tokyo Joshi Pro-Wrestling event. Tatsumi forced Kiryu to submit while on opposite sides of a tag team match. | |
| 1792 | Kakeru Sekiguchi | December 27, 2025 | Year-End Party 2025 | Tokyo, Japan | 1 | <1 | Took place backstage. Won in a game of old maid. | |
| 1793 | Mahiro Kiryu | December 27, 2025 | Year-End Party 2025 | Tokyo, Japan | 11 | <1 | Took place backstage. | |
| 1794 | Yuna Manase | December 27, 2025 | Before Sunrise 2025 | Tokyo, Japan | 2 | <1 | This was a Ganbare☆Pro-Wrestling event. Pinned Kiryu backstage. | |
| 1795 | Ken Ohka | December 27, 2025 | Before Sunrise 2025 | Tokyo, Japan | 9 | <1 | Teaming with Mahiro Kiryu, defeated Manase and Takashi Sasaki; Harukaze and Hartley Jackson; and Moeka Haruhi and Gabai Jichan. Ohka pinned Manase to win the title. | |
| 1796 | Mahiro Kiryu | December 27, 2025 | Before Sunrise 2025 | Tokyo, Japan | 12 | 8 | Pinned Ohka after the match. | |
| 1797 | Aja Kong | January 4, 2026 | Tokyo Joshi Pro-Wrestling '26 | Tokyo, Japan | 6 | <1 | This was a Tokyo Joshi Pro-Wrestling event. Won a four-way match against Kiryu, Rika Tatsumi, and Shino Suzuki, the latter of whom was pinned. | |
| 1798 | Mahiro Kiryu | January 4, 2026 | Tokyo Joshi Pro-Wrestling '26 | Tokyo, Japan | 13 | <1 | Kiryu and Rika Tatsumi pinned Aja Kong at the same time; the referee awarded the title to Kiryu because she was on the bottom. | |
| 1799 | HyperMi Dramatic Dream | January 4, 2026 | Tokyo Joshi Pro-Wrestling '26 | Tokyo, Japan | 1 | <1 | Hyper Misao's modified bicycle. Misao ran over Kiryu during a match with Shoko Nakajima; the referee awarded the title to the bicycle. | |
| 1800 | Mahiro Kiryu | January 4, 2026 | Tokyo Joshi Pro-Wrestling '26 | Tokyo, Japan | 14 | 38 | | |
| 1801 | Miyu Yamashita | February 11, 2026 | Shoko Quest IV: Those Guided By the Snow Country | Niigata, Japan | 6 | <1 | Pinned Kiryu in a match also involving Raku. | |
| 1802 | Rise Shirai | February 11, 2026 | Shoko Quest IV: Those Guided By the Snow Country | Niigata, Japan | 1 | <1 | TJPW's ring announcer. Won at a post-show fan event, in a contest to see who could stop a stopwatch closest to 10 seconds. | |
| 1803 | Rise Shirai's stopwatch | February 11, 2026 | Shoko Quest IV: Those Guided By the Snow Country | Niigata, Japan | 1 | <1 | Mahiro Kiryu choked Shirai with her own stopwatch; the referee awarded the title to the timepiece. | |
| 1804 | Mahiro Kiryu | February 11, 2026 | Shoko Quest IV: Those Guided By the Snow Country | Niigata, Japan | 15 | 3 | | |
| 1805 | Aja Kong | February 14, 2026 | The 6th "Futari wa Princess" Max Heart Tournament Final | Tokyo, Japan | 7 | 7 | | |
| 1806 | Rika Tatsumi | February 21, 2026 | Final Curtain in Kobe Art Center | Kobe, Japan | 6 | 12 | Took place backstage. Tatsumi, Pom Harajuku, and Mahiro Kiryu attacked Kong backstage and pinned her after she slipped on a banana peel. | |
| 1807 | Kukkie! | March 5, 2026 | N/A | N/A | 1 | <1 | A Japanese comedian. Tatsumi forfeited the title to Kukkie! in exchange for an interview and face painting. | |
| 1808 | Rika Tatsumi | March 5, 2026 | N/A | N/A | 7 | 6 | Pinned Kukkie! midway through the interview and face painting. | |
| 1809 | Antonio Honda | March 11, 2026 | Ichikabachika 2026 | Tokyo, Japan | 26 | <1 | Took place backstage. | |
| 1810 | Hisaya Imabayashi | March 11, 2026 | Ichikabachika 2026 | Tokyo, Japan | 2 | 9 | General Manager of DDT. Attacked and pinned Honda after his scheduled match. | |
| 1811 | Minoru Suzuki | March 20, 2026 | N/A | Tokyo, Japan | 1 | 2 | Beat Imabayashi at a press conference. | |
| 1812 | Hisaya Imabayashi's glasses | March 22, 2026 | Judgement 2026 | Tokyo, Japan | 1 | <1 | Pinned Suzuki in a one-on-six handicap match where Suzuki faced Imabayashi, Sanshiro Takagi, Toru Owashi, Danshoku Dino, Antonio Honda, and Super Sasadango Machine. | |
| 1813 | Antonio Honda | March 22, 2026 | Judgement 2026 | Tokyo, Japan | 27 | 7 | Broke the glasses. | |
| 1814 | Raku | March 29, 2026 | TJPW Grand Princess | Tokyo, Japan | 2 | <1 | Pinned Honda backstage. | |
| 1815 | Great Wakabayashi-kun | March 29, 2026 | TJPW Grand Princess | Tokyo, Japan | 8 | <1 | Pinned Raku during a 12-person battle royal. | |
| 1816 | Mahiro Kiryu | March 29, 2026 | TJPW Grand Princess | Tokyo, Japan | 16 | <1 | Pinned Tatsumi during the same battle royal. | |
| 1817 | Sumire Uesaka | March 29, 2026 | TJPW Grand Princess | Tokyo, Japan | 2 | 70 | Pinned Kiryu during the same battle royal. | |
| 1818 | Shoko Nakajima | June 7, 2026 | TJPW Stand Alone '26 | Tokyo, Japan | 2 | <1 | | |
| 1819 | Hyper Misao | June 7, 2026 | TJPW Stand Alone '26 | Tokyo, Japan | 1 | <1 | | |
| 1820 | Pom Harajuku | June 7, 2026 | TJPW Stand Alone '26 | Tokyo, Japan | 1 | <1 | | |
| 1821 | Kazuki Hirata | June 7, 2026 | TJPW Stand Alone '26 | Tokyo, Japan | 59 | 3 | | |
| 1822 | Shunma Katsumata | June 10, 2026 | DDT Dramatic Style 2026 | Tokyo, Japan | 15 | <1 | | |
| 1823 | Kazuki Hirata | June 10, 2026 | DDT Dramatic Style 2026 | Tokyo, Japan | 60 | <1 | | |
| 1824 | Yuya Koroku | June 10, 2026 | DDT Dramatic Style 2026 | Tokyo, Japan | 1 | 3 | This was a six-man tag team match where Paleyouth (Koroku, Takeshi Masada, and Daichi Sato) defeated Hirata, Kumadori, and Shunma Katsumata. Koroku pinned Hirata to win the title. | |
| 1825 | Takeshi Masada | June 13, 2026 | DDT Yokohama Night Splash 2026 | Yokohama, Japan | 3 | <1 | Pinned Koroku after a six-man tag team match where Paleyouth (Koroku, Masada, and Satoh) defeated Danshoku Dino, Kanon, and Kazuki Hirata. | |
| 1826 | Yuya Koroku | June 13, 2026 | DDT Yokohama Night Splash 2026 | Yokohama, Japan | 2 | <1 | | |
| 1827 | Kazuki Hirata | June 13, 2026 | DDT Yokohama Night Splash 2026 | Yokohama, Japan | 61 | 4 | | |
| 1828 | Yuya Koroku | June 17, 2026 | DDT Let's Go To Beer Garden Pro Wrestling | Tokyo, Japan | 3 | 1 | | |
| 1829 | Bunbun | June 18, 2026 | DDT Let's Go To Beer Garden Pro Wrestling | Tokyo, Japan | 1 | <1 | A puppet and mascot of the Paleyouth stable. Daichi Sato pinned Koroku while holding Bunbun; the referee judged the puppet as the new champion. | |
| 1830 | Antonio Honda | June 18, 2026 | DDT Let's Go To Beer Garden Pro Wrestling | Tokyo, Japan | 28 | <1 | | |
| 1831 | Yuya Koroku | June 18, 2026 | DDT Let's Go To Beer Garden Pro Wrestling | Tokyo, Japan | 4 | <1 | Pinned Honda in a match where Paleyouth (Koroku, Takeshi Masada, and Daichi Sato) defeated Honda, Chris Brookes, and Akito. | |
| 1832 | Kazuki Hirata | June 18, 2026 | DDT Let's Go To Beer Garden Pro Wrestling | Tokyo, Japan | 62 | 2 | | |
| 1833 | Danshoku Dino's tights | June 20, 2026 | DDT Tropical Naniwan Summer | Osaka, Japan | 1 | <1 | Yuya Koroku pinned Kazuki Hirata after Danshoku Dino had taken off his tights and dropped them on Hirata; the referee judged the ring gear to be the new champion. | |
| 1834 | Kazuki Hirata | June 20, 2026 | DDT Tropical Naniwan Summer | Osaka, Japan | 63 | 7 | | |
| 1835 | Shunma Katsumata | June 27, 2026 | DDT x Grand Hammer Street Pro Wrestling Showdown at Shimbashi Yokocho ~Busho~ | Tokyo, Japan | 16 | 1 | Pinned Hirata in a match where Katsumata and Yuni defeated Hirata and Danshoku Dino. | |
| 1836 | Kimihiro | June 28, 2026 | DDT King of Kings | Tokyo, Japan | 1 | 7 | Manager and MC of the Strange Love Connection stable. Defeated Katsumata in a rap battle. | |
| 1837 | Chris Brookes | July 5, 2026 | DDT Rembrandt Highway Series 2026 ~Ayu Coliseum in Atsugi~ | Atsugi, Japan | 6 | <1 | | |
| 1838 | Kimihiro | July 5, 2026 | DDT Rembrandt Highway Series 2026 ~Ayu Coliseum in Atsugi~ | Atsugi, Japan | 2 | <1 | | |
| 1839 | Kazuki Hirata | July 5, 2026 | DDT Rembrandt Highway Series 2026 ~Ayu Coliseum in Atsugi~ | Atsugi, Japan | 64 | 3 | Took place at a post-show fan event. | |
| 1840 | Kazuma Sumi | July 8, 2026 | DDT Asakusa Box Nakamise Fighting | Tokyo, Japan | 6 | 4 | Pinned Hirata in a match where Sumi, Mao, and Kanon defeated Hirata, Danshoku Dino, and Yoshihiko. | |
| 1841 | Yuya Koroku | July 12, 2026 | DDT Check Out DDT at Granship | Shizuoka, Japan | 5 | <1 | | |
| 1842 | Kazuma Sumi | July 12, 2026 | DDT Check Out DDT at Granship | Shizuoka, Japan | 7 | 3 | | |
| 1843 | Shunma Katsumata | July 15, 2026 | DDT Fighting Beer Garden 2026 in Shinjuku | Tokyo, Japan | 17 | 4 | | |
| 1844 | Yuni | July 19, 2026 | DDT Let's Go! Imaike Mottoike | Nagoya, Japan | 11 | 7 | After an NωA Jr. performance, Katsumata admitted that Yuni's side of the crowd had cheered more than his; this was judged to be a loss by submission. | |
| 1845 | Antonio Honda | July 26, 2026 | DDT Rock in Ring 2026 ~One Hit Kill~ | Tokyo, Japan | 29 | <1 | Pinned Yuni in a dark match where Honda, Masami Inahata, and Hinata Kasai defeated Yuni, Naomi Yoshimura, and Rukiya. | |
| 1846 | Raku | July 26, 2026 | DDT Rock in Ring 2026 ~One Hit Kill~ | Tokyo, Japan | 3 | 5 | | |
| 1847 | Marika Kobashi | July 31, 2026 | TJPW Love & Peace TIF Pro Wrestling | Tokyo, Japan | 2 | <1 | | |
| 1848 | Amanda | July 31, 2026 | TJPW Love & Peace TIF Pro Wrestling | Tokyo, Japan | 1 | <1 | An idol and member of KLP48. | |
| 1849 | Mifu Ashida | July 31, 2026 | TJPW Love & Peace TIF Pro Wrestling | Tokyo, Japan | 1 | <1 | Took place backstage. Ashida shook pom-poms in Amanda's face until she gave up and forfeited the title to her. | |
| 1850 | Shoko Nakajima | July 31, 2026 | TJPW Love & Peace TIF Pro Wrestling | Tokyo, Japan | 3 | <1 | Pinned Ashida during a tag team match where Nakajima, Hyper Misao, and Yuki Aino defeated Ashida, Miyu Yamashita, and Ren Konatsu. | |
| 1851 | Hyper Misao | July 31, 2026 | TJPW Love & Peace TIF Pro Wrestling | Tokyo, Japan | 2 | <1 | | |
| 1852 | Ai Asakura | July 31, 2026 | TJPW Love & Peace TIF Pro Wrestling | Tokyo, Japan | 1 | <1 | An idol and member of Neo Japonism. | |
| 1853 | Mifu Ashida | July 31, 2026 | TJPW Love & Peace TIF Pro Wrestling | Tokyo, Japan | 2 | <1 | Tricked Asakura into forfeiting the title to her immediately afterward. | |
| 1854 | Shiori Futaba | July 31, 2026 | TJPW Love & Peace TIF Pro Wrestling | Tokyo, Japan | 1 | <1 | An idol and member of Congrazie!. | |
| 1855 | Shoko Nakajima | July 31, 2026 | TJPW Love & Peace TIF Pro Wrestling | Tokyo, Japan | 4 | <1 | Won by submission after biting Futaba. | |
| 1856 | Pokotan | July 31, 2026 | TJPW Love & Peace TIF Pro Wrestling | Tokyo, Japan | 4 | <1 | Took place backstage. | |
| 1857 | Karin Matoba | July 31, 2026 | N/A | Tokyo, Japan | 1 | <1 | Took place at a Niji no Conquistador live performance. Matoba pinned Pokotan after the mascot tripped while attempting to challenge Matoba to a dance-off. | |
| 1858 | Pokotan's head | July 31, 2026 | N/A | Tokyo, Japan | 2 | <1 | Took place at the same performance. Pokotan put its head over Matoba's, who was scared and tapped out; the referee judged the head to be the new champion. | |
| 1859 | Mone Kitazawa | July 31, 2026 | N/A | Tokyo, Japan | 1 | 1 | Took place backstage after the above performance. An idol and member of NGT48. | |
| 1860 | Pom Harajuku | August 1, 2026 | TJPW Love & Peace TIF Pro Wrestling | Tokyo, Japan | 2 | <1 | Took place backstage before the event. | |
| 1861 | Reina Seiji | August 1, 2026 | TJPW Love & Peace TIF Pro Wrestling | Tokyo, Japan | 1 | <1 | An idol and member of NGT48. | |
| 1862 | Pom Harajuku | August 1, 2026 | TJPW Love & Peace TIF Pro Wrestling | Tokyo, Japan | 3 | <1 | | |
| 1863 | Pom Harajuku's soft drink | August 1, 2026 | TJPW Love & Peace TIF Pro Wrestling | Tokyo, Japan | 1 | <1 | Took place backstage. Pom Harajuku fell asleep holding a soft drink; the referee judged the beverage to be the new champion. | |
| 1864 | Zahrachahiyoni Saito | August 1, 2026 | TJPW Love & Peace TIF Pro Wrestling | Tokyo, Japan | 1 | <1 | An idol and member of Fishbowl. Took place backstage. Saito won by drinking the champion. | |
| 1865 | Rio Ohmori | August 1, 2026 | TJPW Love & Peace TIF Pro Wrestling | Tokyo, Japan | 1 | <1 | An idol and member of Ma'Scar'Piece. Saito agreed to put her championship on the line based on the result of a match between Yuki Arai and Shino Suzuki (supported by Saito) and Hyper Misao and Haru Kazashiro (supported by Ohmori). Since Misao and Kazashiro won, Ohmori won the title. | |
| 1866 | Hyper Misao | August 1, 2026 | TJPW Love & Peace TIF Pro Wrestling | Tokyo, Japan | 3 | <1 | | |
| 1867 | Mahiro Kiryu | August 1, 2026 | TJPW Love & Peace TIF Pro Wrestling | Tokyo, Japan | 17 | <1 | | |
| 1868 | Tama | August 1, 2026 | TJPW Love & Peace TIF Pro Wrestling | Tokyo, Japan | 1 | <1 | A mascot character. Attacked Kiryu with a kitchen knife. | |
| 1869 | Miyu Yamashita | August 1, 2026 | TJPW Love & Peace TIF Pro Wrestling | Tokyo, Japan | 7 | 1 | Took Tama's knife and threatened it until it forfeited the title to her. | |
| 1870 | Marina Kumamoto | August 2, 2026 | TJPW Love & Peace TIF Pro Wrestling | Tokyo, Japan | 1 | <1 | An idol and member of Niji no Conquistador. Several wrestlers and idols pinned Yamashita at once; Kumamoto was judged to be on top of her. | |
| 1871 | Miyu Yamashita | August 2, 2026 | TJPW Love & Peace TIF Pro Wrestling | Tokyo, Japan | 8 | <1 | Yamashita convinced Kumamoto to forfeit the title to her by reminding her that she might be attacked by her bandmates mid-performance. | |
| 1872 | Raku | August 2, 2026 | TJPW Love & Peace TIF Pro Wrestling | Tokyo, Japan | 4 | <1 | Took place backstage. | |
| 1873 | Aya Kajishima's recorder | August 2, 2026 | TJPW Love & Peace TIF Pro Wrestling | Tokyo, Japan | 1 | <1 | Kajishima, an idol and member of Up Up Girls 2, played Raku a lullaby with a recorder and then attempted to pin her; the referee judged the recorder to be the new champion. | |
| 1874 | Aya Kajishima | August 2, 2026 | TJPW Love & Peace TIF Pro Wrestling | Tokyo, Japan | 1 | <1 | | |
| 1875 | Pom Harajuku | August 2, 2026 | TJPW Love & Peace TIF Pro Wrestling | Tokyo, Japan | 4 | <1 | | |
| 1876 | Tetsuya Koda | August 2, 2026 | TJPW Love & Peace TIF Pro Wrestling | Tokyo, Japan | 4 | 3 | President of Tokyo Joshi Pro-Wrestling. Attacked Harajuku while disguised as Pokotan. | |
| 1877 | Hisaya Imabayashi | August 5, 2026 | DDT Memories of Summer Vacation | Tokyo, Japan | 3 | <1 | | |
| 1878 | Ilusion | August 5, 2026 | DDT Memories of Summer Vacation | Tokyo, Japan | 3 | 2 | | |
| 1879 | Yuni | August 7, 2026 | DDT Wrestle Peter Pan 2026 Press Conference and Pre-Event Party | Tokyo, Japan | 3 | <1 | Pinned Ilusion in a match where Yuni and Shunma Katsumata defeated Ilusion and Hideki Okatani. | |
| 1880 | Ilusion | August 7, 2026 | DDT Wrestle Peter Pan 2026 Press Conference and Pre-Event Party | Tokyo, Japan | 4 | <1 | | |
| 1881 | Masami Inahata | August 7, 2026 | DDT Wrestle Peter Pan 2026 Press Conference and Pre-Event Party | Tokyo, Japan | 1 | <1 | | |
| 1882 | Takeshi Masada | August 7, 2026 | DDT Wrestle Peter Pan 2026 Press Conference and Pre-Event Party | Tokyo, Japan | 4 | <1 | Pinned Inahata in a match that also involved Masada, Yuya Koroku, and Daichi Sato defeated Inahata, Kazuma Sumi, and To-y. | |
| 1883 | Yuki Ishida | August 7, 2026 | DDT Wrestle Peter Pan 2026 Press Conference and Pre-Event Party | Tokyo, Japan | 1 | 4 | | |
| 1884 | Ilusion | August 11, 2026 | Wrestle Peter Pan | Tokyo, Japan | 5 | <1 | | |
| 1885 | Super Sasadango Machine | August 11, 2026 | Wrestle Peter Pan | Tokyo, Japan | 12 | <1 | This was during Ilusion's Bill Goldberg-inspired entrance to the event's advertised Gauntlet entry Battle Royal for the title, which the new champion continued. | |
| 1886 | Yuki Ishida | August 11, 2026 | Wrestle Peter Pan | Tokyo, Japan | 2 | <1 | Continued the entrance. | |
| 1887 | Yuni | August 11, 2026 | Wrestle Peter Pan | Tokyo, Japan | 13 | <1 | Continued the entrance. | |
| 1888 | Kazuki Hirata | August 11, 2026 | Wrestle Peter Pan | Tokyo, Japan | 65 | <1 | Continued the entrance. Was not part of the advertised match. | |
| 1889 | Akito | August 11, 2026 | Wrestle Peter Pan | Tokyo, Japan | 8 | <1 | Continued the entrance. Was granted a year-long free bus pass for entering the match as champion. | |
| 1890 | Masami Inahata | August 11, 2026 | Wrestle Peter Pan | Tokyo, Japan | 2 | <1 | This was a Gauntlet entry Battle Royal also involving Soma Takao, Naomi Yoshimura, Fuminori Abe, Yuki Iino, Toru Owashi, Yuni, Ilusion, MJ Paul, Yuki Ishida and Super Sasadango Machine. | |
| 1891 | Yoshihiko | August 11, 2026 | Wrestle Peter Pan | Tokyo, Japan | 23 | <1 | | |
| 1892 | Ilusion | August 11, 2026 | Wrestle Peter Pan | Tokyo, Japan | 6 | <1 | | |
| 1893 | Kazuki Hirata | August 11, 2026 | Wrestle Peter Pan | Tokyo, Japan | 66 | <1 | Won the title after the official conclusion of the match, moments before his own scheduled match. | |
| 1894 | Shogo Yamamoto | August 11, 2026 | Wrestle Peter Pan | Tokyo, Japan | 1 | <1 | Member of J-Pop group The Rampage from Exile Tribe, serving as the Peter Pan event's ambassador. | |
| 1895 | Mao | August 11, 2026 | Wrestle Peter Pan | Tokyo, Japan | 9 | 2 | | |
| 1896 | Shunma Katsumata | August 13, 2026 | DDT Beer Garden Pro Wrestling In Shinjuku - Final Countdown 3 | Tokyo, Japan | 18 | <1 | | |
| 1897 | Yuni | August 13, 2026 | DDT Beer Garden Pro Wrestling In Shinjuku - Final Countdown 3 | Tokyo, Japan | 14 | <1 | | |
| 1898 | Kumadori | August 13, 2026 | DDT Beer Garden Pro Wrestling In Shinjuku - Final Countdown 3 | Tokyo, Japan | 1 | <1 | Member of music/dance group O-MENZ. | |
| 1899 | Shunma Katsumata | August 13, 2026 | DDT Beer Garden Pro Wrestling In Shinjuku - Final Countdown 3 | Tokyo, Japan | 19 | 1 | | |
| 1900 | Danshoku Dino | August 14, 2026 | DDT The Final Shinjuku FACE Beer Garden Pro Wrestling | Tokyo, Japan | 51 | 3 | Pinned Katsumata in a match where Dino, Keisuke Ishii, and Junta Miyawaki defeated Katsumata, Yuki Iino, and Kazuki Hirata. | |
| 1901 | Kazuma Sumi | August 17, 2026 | DDT Kanda Myojin Cultural Exchange presents After Peter Pan ~Ryogoku After Party~ | Tokyo, Japan | 8 | 9 | | |
| 1902 | Shunma Katsumata | August 26, 2026 | DDT Dramatic Beer Garden Neverland 2026 | Tokyo, Japan | 20 | 4 | | |
| 1903 | Kumadori | August 30, 2026 | DDT Last Summer Standing ~Summer's Reckoning~ | Tokyo, Japan | 2 | 10 | | |
| 1904 | Shunma Katsumata | September 9, 2026 | DDT Ring no Aki Basho 2026 | Tokyo, Japan | 21 | <1 | | |
| 1905 | Masami Inahata | September 9, 2026 | DDT Ring no Aki Basho 2026 | Tokyo, Japan | 3 | <1 | | |
| 1906 | Ilusion | September 9, 2026 | DDT Ring no Aki Basho 2026 | Tokyo, Japan | 7 | 10 | | |
| 1907 | Danshoku Dino | September 19, 2026 | DDT Echigo Back Drop | Niigata, Japan | 52 | 2 | | |
| 1908 | Jun Akiyama | September 21, 2026 | Dramatic Infinity 2026 | Tokyo, Japan | 5 | <1 | This was a tag team match in which Akiyama teamed up with Yuji Nagata to defeat Harashima and Dino who took the pinfall and lose the title. | |
| 1909 | Yuji Nagata | September 21, 2026 | Dramatic Infinity 2026 | Tokyo, Japan | 1 | 6 | Nagata pinned Akiyama in the ring. | |
| 1910 | Manabu Nakanishi | September 27, 2026 | N/A | Tokyo, Japan | 1 | <1 | Took place inside a restaurant. | |
| 1911 | Yuji Nagata | September 27, 2026 | N/A | Tokyo, Japan | 2 | 1 | Took place inside a restaurant. | |
| 1912 | Sanshiro Takagi | September 28, 2026 | Super Japan Shinjuku FACE Countdown Series ~Goodbye Shinjuku FACE~ | Tokyo, Japan | 18 | 2 | | |
| 1913 | Yuka Ogawa | September 30, 2026 | Shinjuku FACE Countdown Series ~Meishin Rukotsu~ | Tokyo, Japan | 1 | <1 | Manager of Shinjuku Face. | |
| 1914 | Shinjuku Face | September 30, 2026 | Shinjuku FACE Countdown Series ~Meishin Rukotsu~ | Tokyo, Japan | 1 | <1 | Ogawa gave up the title to the event hall itself, paying homage to the latter's close down. | |
| — | Vacated | September 30, 2026 | Shinjuku FACE Countdown Series ~Meishin Rukotsu~ | Tokyo, Japan | — | — | The title became vacant as a result of the champion, Shinjuku Face, closing. | |
| 1915 | Yuki Ueno | October 4, 2026 | Naniwa Pro Wrestling Road 2026 | Osaka, Japan | 11 | 4 | Defeated Masami Inahata to win the vacant title. | |
| 1916 | Shunma Katsumata | October 8, 2026 | Beer Garden Pro Wrestling 2026 | Tokyo, Japan | 22 | <1 | | |
| 1917 | Yuki Ueno | October 8, 2026 | Beer Garden Pro Wrestling 2026 | Tokyo, Japan | 12 | 10 | | |
| 1918 | Super Sasadango Machine | October 18, 2026 | Wrestling Harvest 2026 | Tokyo, Japan | 13 | <1 | | |
| 1919 | Yuki Ueno | October 18, 2026 | Wrestling Harvest 2026 | Tokyo, Japan | 13 | <1 | | |
| 1920 | Danshoku Dino | October 18, 2026 | Wrestling Harvest 2026 | Tokyo, Japan | 53 | <1 | | |
| 1921 | To-y | October 18, 2026 | Wrestling Harvest 2026 | Tokyo, Japan | 5 | <1 | | |
| 1922 | Super Sasadango Machine | October 18, 2026 | Wrestling Harvest 2026 | Tokyo, Japan | 14 | <1 | | |
| 1923 | Yui Yoshida | October 18, 2026 | Wrestling Harvest 2026 | Tokyo, Japan | 1 | <1 | | |
| 1924 | Danshoku Dino | October 18, 2026 | Wrestling Harvest 2026 | Tokyo, Japan | 54 | <1 | | |
| 1925 | Yuki Ueno | October 18, 2026 | Wrestling Harvest 2026 | Tokyo, Japan | 14 | <1 | | |
| 1926 | Kazuki Hirata | October 18, 2026 | Wrestling Harvest 2026 | Tokyo, Japan | 67 | <1 | | |
| 1927 | Super Sasadango Machine | October 18, 2026 | Wrestling Harvest 2026 | Tokyo, Japan | 15 | 6 | | |
| 1928 | Junta Miyawaki | October 24, 2026 | Yokohama Pro Wrestling Rapsody | Tokyo, Japan | 1 | 10 | Pinned Dino in a tag team match in which Miyawaki teamed with Jun Akiyama against Sasadango and Danshoku Dino. | |
| 1929 | Mason Madden | November 3, 2026 | Ultimate Party | Tokyo, Japan | 1 | <1 | | |
| 1930 | Mansoor | November 3, 2026 | Ultimate Party | Tokyo, Japan | 1 | <1 | | |
| 1931 | Yoshihiko | November 3, 2026 | Ultimate Party | Tokyo, Japan | 24 | 0+ | | |

== Combined reigns ==
As of August 14, 2026

=== Individual wrestlers ===
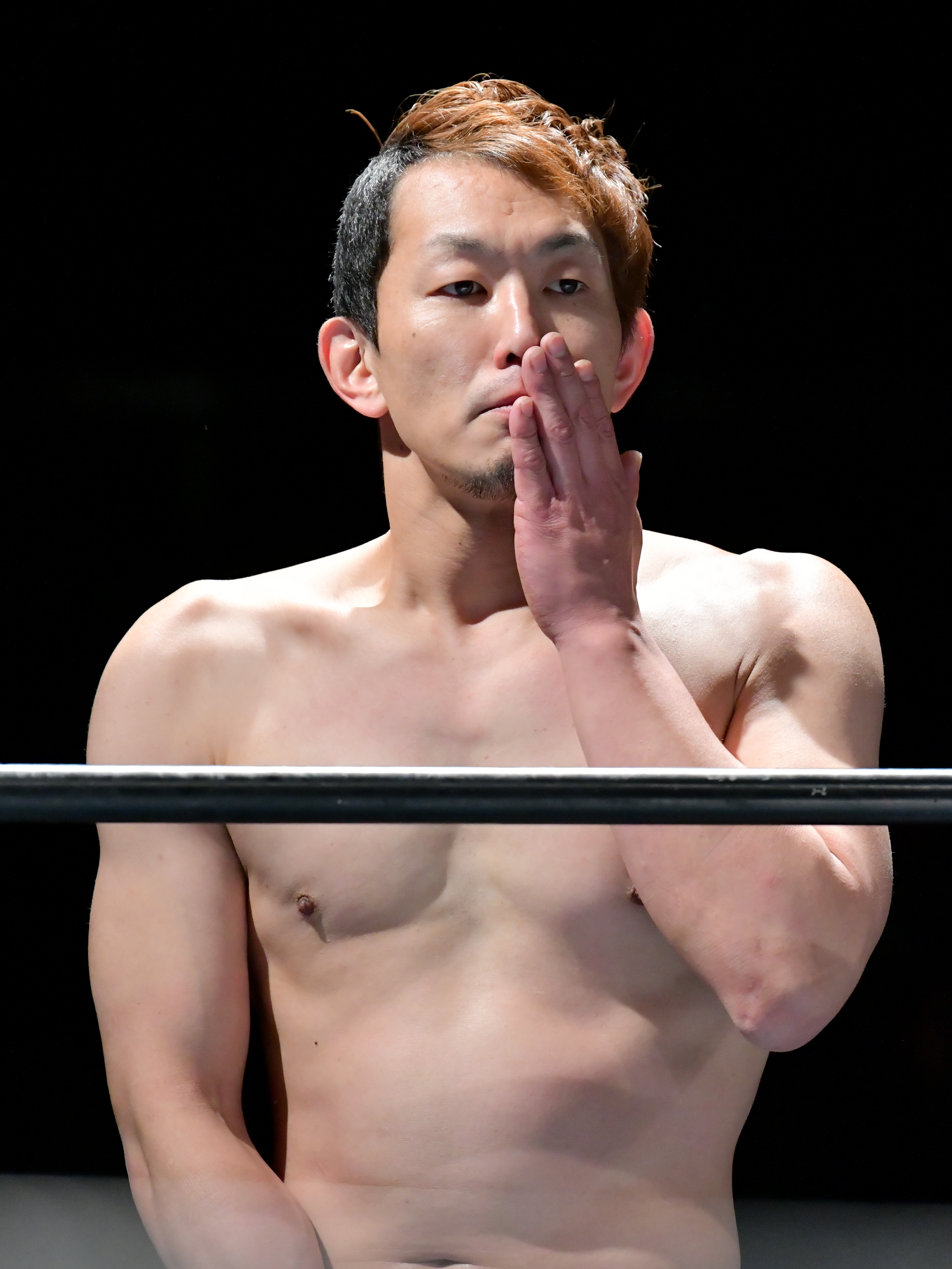
Shinobu holds the record for most reigns at 216

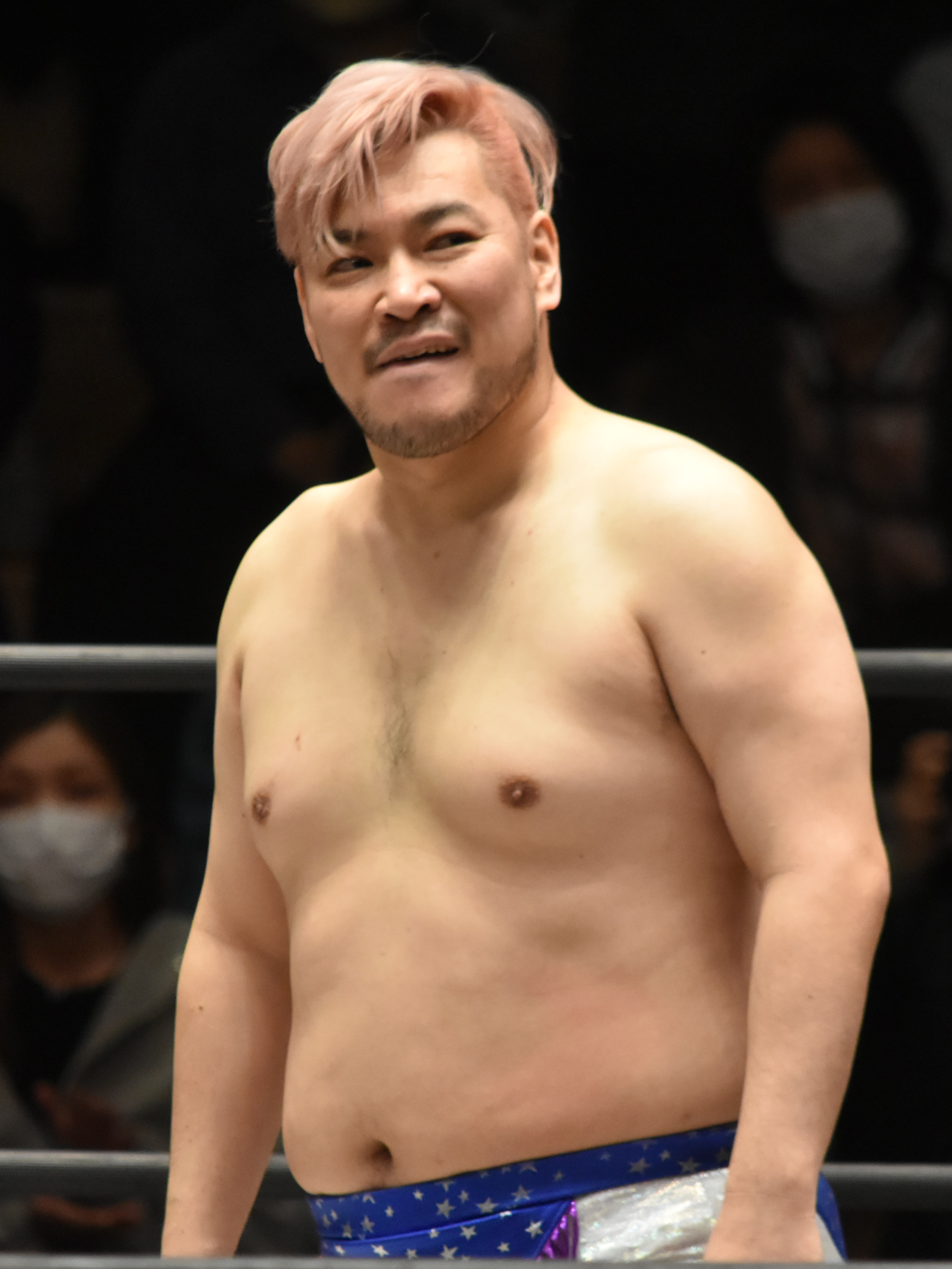
Danshoku Dino holds the record for longest combined reigns at 619 confirmed days.

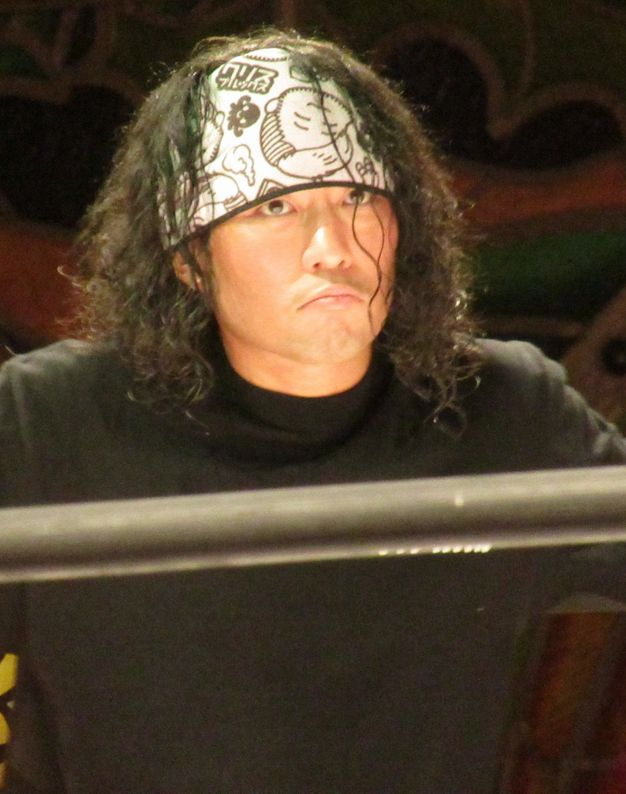
Masa Takanashi holds the record for the longest singular reign at 333 days

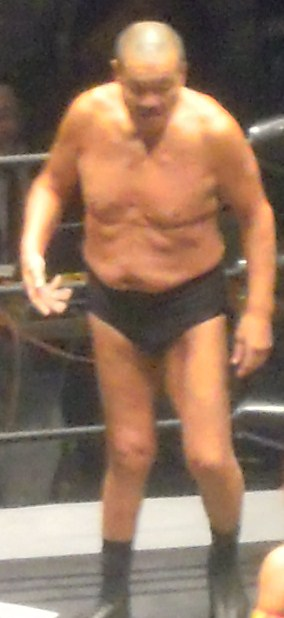
Yoshiaki Fujiwara was the oldest champion winning the title at 63 years old

This list contains combined reigns of all male/female wrestlers who held the title for a known duration. Some names may appear more than once in the teams list underneath completed by the combined days held and times won in this one.

| † | Indicates the current champion |
| ¤ | The exact length of at least one title reign is uncertain, so the shortest length is considered. |

| Rank | Wrestler | No. of reigns | Combined days |
|---|---|---|---|
| 1 | Danshoku Dino/Danshoku "Dandy" Dino | 54 | 624¤ |
| 2 | Poco Takanashi/Masahiro Mechanashi/Masa Takanashi/Masahiro Takanashi | 23 | 398 |
| 3 | Gintaro Kanemura/Shoichi Ichimiya/Sanshiro Takagi/Magnum Tokyo/Tarzan Gito | 18 | 382 |
| 4 | Sanshiro Takagi/Unagi Sanshiro | 18 | 326 |
| 5 | Toru Owashi | 32 | 310 |
| 6 | Aja Kong | 7 | 304 |
| 7 | Saki Akai | 24 | 290 |
| 8 | LiLiCo | 2 | 240 |
| 9 | Chotaro Kamoi | 9 | 183 |
| 10 | Super Sasadango Machine/Muscle/Yoshihiro Sakai | 14 | 181 |
| 11 | Joey Ryan | 43 | 162 |
| 12 | Kazuhiko Ogasawara | 6 | 154 |
| 13 | DJ Nira | 11 | 153 |
| 14 | Gorgeous Matsuno/Mecha Matsuno | 18 | 142 |
| 15 | Asian Cougar | 2 | 119 |
| 16 | Mahiro Kiryu | 17 | 118 |
| 17 | Unagi Sayaka | 12 | 111 |
| 18 | Harashima/Hero! | 5 | 108 |
| 19 | Kazuki Hirata/Ichiko Hirata | 67 | 107 |
| 20 | Yuki Miyazaki | 15 | 105 |
| 21 | Shark Tsuchiya | 1 | 104 |
| 22 | Yuu | 2 | 95 |
| 23 | Aika | 2 | 84 |
| 24 | Poison Sawada Black/Poison Julie Sawada/Poison Sawada Julie | 10 | 76 |
| 25 | Yuka Nakamura | 3 | 70 |
| 26 | Kudo | 3 | 66 |
| 26 | Shinichiro Kawamatsu | 1 | 66 |
| 28 | Ken Ohka/O.K. Revolution | 8 | 65 |
| 29 | Shunma Katsumata | 22 | 64 |
| 30 | Shinya Aoki | 3 | 57 |
| 31 | Yusuke Inokuma | 12 | 56¤ |
| 31 | Dean Malenko | 1 | 56 |
| 33 | Rika Tatsumi/Great Wakabayashi-kun | 8 | 53 |
| 34 | Akito | 8 | 52 |
| 35 | Kenshin/Issei Fujisawa | 8 | 51 |
| 35 | Apple Miyuki/Miyuki Matsuyama | 3 | 51 |
| 37 | Cherry | 22 | 50 |
| 37 | Kana | 5 | 50 |
| 39 | Senpai | 1 | 49 |
| 40 | Futoshi Miwa/The Mac | 11 | 42 |
| 40 | Yasu Urano | 6 | 42 |
| 40 | Thanomsak Toba | 5 | 42 |
| 40 | Kota Ibushi | 3 | 42 |
| 44 | Hikaru Sato | 2 | 41 |
| 45 | Makoto Oishi | 28 | 40 |
| 45 | Bullfight Sora | 11 | 40 |
| 45 | Great Koji/To-y | 5 | 40 |
| 48 | Konosuke Takeshita | 4 | 39 |
| 48 | Ayumi Kurihara | 2 | 39 |
| 50 | Yuki Ueno | 14 | 37 |
| 50 | Mitsunobu Kikuzawa/Kikutaro | 11 | 37 |
| 50 | Miyu Yamashita | 8 | 37 |
| 50 | Toshiyuki Moriya/MMM | 5 | 37 |
| 50 | Hikari | 2 | 37 |
| 55 | Britt Baker | 1 | 36 |
| 56 | Hebikage | 2 | 35 |
| 57 | Antonio Honda | 29 | 34 |
| 57 | Puma King | 8 | 34 |
| 57 | Rojo del Sol/Taiyo Rojo/Black Buffalo | 4 | 34 |
| 60 | Yuuki | 2 | 33 |
| 61 | Mao | 9 | 32 |
| 62 | Shigehiro Irie | 2 | 32 |
| 63 | Joey Janela | 5 | 31 |
| 64 | Jun Akiyama | 5 | 30 |
| 64 | Riki Senshu | 3 | 30 |
| 66 | Yukio Sakaguchi | 7 | 29 |
| 66 | The Crazy SKB | 2 | 29 |
| 68 | Kazuma Sumi | 7 | 28 |
| 68 | Naruki Doi | 2 | 28 |
| 70 | Chris Brookes | 6 | 27 |
| 71 | Orange Cassidy | 1 | 22 |
| 72 | Asuka | 3 | 21 |
| 72 | Chiharu | 3 | 21 |
| 74 | Maki Itoh | 6 | 20 |
| 74 | Misae-chan/Misae Genki | 5 | 20 |
| 76 | Michael Nakazawa | 14 | 19 |
| 76 | Hiromu Takahashi | 3 | 19 |
| 78 | Yuni | 14 | 18 |
| 78 | Choun Shiryu | 5 | 18 |
| 78 | Takeshi Masada | 4 | 18 |
| 78 | Yuki Arai | 1 | 18 |
| 82 | Naoshi Sano/Mecha Stanley | 17 | 17 |
| 83 | Kazumasa Nihei | 3 | 15 |
| 83 | Chinsuke Nakamura | 2 | 15 |
| 85 | Keisuke Ishii | 6 | 14 |
| 85 | Masakazu Nagase | 5 | 14 |
| 85 | "Showa" | 2 | 14 |
| 85 | Kaori Yoneyama | 1 | 14 |
| 89 | Kintaro Kanemura | 2 | 13 |
| 90 | Ilusion | 7 | 12 |
| 90 | Laura James | 5 | 12 |
| 90 | Yuki Sato | 4 | 12 |
| 93 | Moeka Haruhi | 3 | 11 |
| 93 | Tsukasa Fujimoto | 3 | 11 |
| 93 | Chocoball Mukai | 2 | 11 |
| 93 | Head of the Student Council/Takashi Sasaki | 2 | 11 |
| 93 | Maho Kurone | 1 | 11 |
| 98 | Junta Miyawaki | 1 | 10 |
| 99 | Kumadori | 2 | 10 |
| 100 | Toshie Uematsu | 4 | 9 |
| 101 | Shinobu | 216 | 8¤ |
| 101 | Penelope Ford | 1 | 8 |
| 103 | Yuji Nagata | 2 | 7 |
| 104 | Etsuko Mita | 1 | 7 |
| 105 | Guanchulo/Diego | 5 | 6 |
| 106 | Raku | 4 | 5 |
| 106 | Tetsuya Endo | 1 | 5 |
| 106 | Shota | 1 | 5 |
| 109 | Nobuhiro Shimatani | 9 | 4 |
| 109 | Colt Cabana | 2 | 4 |
| 109 | Kuroshio Tokyo Japan | 1 | 4 |
| 109 | Yuya Koroku | 5 | 4 |
| 109 | Yuki Ishida | 2 | 4 |
| 114 | Hiroshi Fukuda | 13 | 3 |
| 114 | Daisuke Sasaki | 5 | 3 |
| 114 | Dick Togo | 3 | 3 |
| 114 | Ebessan (III) | 2 | 3 |
| 114 | Tigers Mask | 2 | 3 |
| 114 | Candice LeRae | 1 | 3 |
| 114 | Cereal Man | 1 | 3 |
| 114 | Hiroyo Matsumoto | 1 | 3 |
| 114 | Yoshiko Hasegawa | 1 | 3 |
| 123 | Mad Paulie | 3 | 2 |
| 123 | Kanjyuro Matsuyama | 2 | 2 |
| 123 | Mio Shirai | 2 | 2 |
| 123 | Ajayu | 1 | 2 |
| 123 | "Speedball" Mike Bailey | 1 | 2 |
| 123 | Taiji Ishimori | 1 | 2 |
| 123 | Takoyakida | 1 | 2 |
| 123 | Taya Valkyrie | 1 | 2 |
| 131 | Gota Ihashi | 7 | 1 |
| 131 | Soma Takao | 4 | 1 |
| 131 | Kuishinbo Kamen | 2 | 1 |
| 131 | Nixon Newell | 2 | 1 |
| 131 | Rocky Romero | 2 | 1 |
| 131 | Brian Cage | 1 | 1 |
| 131 | Cima | 1 | 1 |
| 131 | Excalibur | 1 | 1 |
| 131 | Jarek 1:20 | 1 | 1 |
| 131 | Johnny Gargano | 1 | 1 |
| 131 | Jungle Boy | 1 | 1 |
| 131 | La Hiedra | 1 | 1 |
| 131 | Nate Webb | 1 | 1 |
| 131 | Ricochet | 1 | 1 |
| 131 | Zack Sabre Jr. | 1 | 1 |
| 148 | Yuko Miyamoto | 215 | <1¤ |
| 148 | Mason Madden | 1 | <1 |
| 148 | Mansoor | 1 | <1 |
| 148 | Mikami | 12 | <1 |
| 148 | Tomomitsu Matsunaga | 10 | <1 |
| 148 | Fushicho Karasu | 6 | <1 |
| 148 | Seiya Morohashi | 6 | <1 |
| 148 | Emi Sakura | 5 | <1 |
| 148 | Gentaro/Nasty Black Panther | 5 | <1 |
| 148 | Tanny Mouse | 5 | <1 |
| 148 | Hoshitango | 4 | <1 |
| 148 | Pom Harajuku | 4 | <1 |
| 148 | Shoko Nakajima | 4 | <1 |
| 148 | Daichi Kakimoto | 3 | <1 |
| 148 | Hyper Misao | 3 | <1 |
| 148 | Jigoku Soldier | 3 | <1 |
| 148 | Ladybeard | 3 | <1 |
| 148 | Munenori Sawa | 3 | <1 |
| 148 | Ram Kaicho | 3 | <1 |
| 148 | Suguru Miyatake | 3 | <1 |
| 148 | Taneichi Kacho | 3 | <1 |
| 148 | Yuichi | 3 | <1 |
| 148 | 726 | 2 | <1 |
| 148 | Bear Fukuda/Mango Fukuda | 2 | <1 |
| 148 | Exciting Yoshida | 2 | <1 |
| 148 | Guts Ishijima | 2 | <1 |
| 148 | Keigo Nakamura | 2 | <1 |
| 148 | Ken Kataya | 2 | <1 |
| 148 | Koichiro Kimura | 2 | <1 |
| 148 | Marika Kobashi | 2 | <1 |
| 148 | Masao Inoue | 2 | <1 |
| 148 | Masami Inahata | 3 | <1 |
| 148 | Matt Striker | 2 | <1 |
| 148 | Mifu Ashida | 2 | <1 |
| 148 | Mizuki | 2 | <1 |
| 148 | Mizuki Watase | 2 | <1 |
| 148 | Naoki Tanizaki | 2 | <1 |
| 148 | Natsuki☆Head | 2 | <1 |
| 148 | Rina Yamashita | 2 | <1 |
| 148 | Satoru | 2 | <1 |
| 148 | Shigero Kato | 2 | <1 |
| 148 | Suge D | 2 | <1 |
| 148 | Swoggle | 2 | <1 |
| 148 | The Bloody | 2 | <1 |
| 148 | Tommy Dreamer | 2 | <1 |
| 148 | Toshie Uematsu | 2 | <1 |
| 148 | Tsuyoshi Kikuchi | 2 | <1 |
| 148 | Yukihiro Abe | 2 | <1 |
| 148 | 2 Tuff Tony | 1 | <1 |
| 148 | A. C. H. | 1 | <1 |
| 148 | Antonio Koinoki | 1 | <1 |
| 148 | Bandido | 1 | <1 |
| 148 | Bio-Monster DNA | 1 | <1 |
| 148 | Brandi Rhodes | 1 | <1 |
| 148 | Brian Kendrick | 1 | <1 |
| 148 | Buggy Nova | 1 | <1 |
| 148 | Bull Armor Takuya | 1 | <1 |
| 148 | Cheerleader Melissa | 1 | <1 |
| 148 | Chii Tomiya | 1 | <1 |
| 148 | Chris Hero | 1 | <1 |
| 148 | Chris Masters | 1 | <1 |
| 148 | Chuck Taylor | 1 | <1 |
| 148 | Cole Radrick | 1 | <1 |
| 148 | CPA | 1 | <1 |
| 148 | Cuban Heat | 1 | <1 |
| 148 | Daga | 1 | <1 |
| 148 | Dai Suzuki | 1 | <1 |
| 148 | Daikokubō Benkei | 1 | <1 |
| 148 | Dark Shaman Morinosu | 1 | <1 |
| 148 | Dokaben | 1 | <1 |
| 148 | Drew Gulak | 1 | <1 |
| 148 | Eddie Kingston | 1 | <1 |
| 148 | Effy | 1 | <1 |
| 148 | El Texano Jr. | 1 | <1 |
| 148 | Eli Drake | 1 | <1 |
| 148 | Fairy Nihonbashi | 1 | <1 |
| 148 | Fang Suzuki | 1 | <1 |
| 148 | Gabai Jichan | 1 | <1 |
| 148 | Giovanni Lombardo Jr. | 1 | <1 |
| 148 | Hana Kimura | 1 | <1 |
| 148 | Haruka Matsuo | 1 | <1 |
| 148 | Haruka Umesaki | 1 | <1 |
| 148 | Haruna Neko | 1 | <1 |
| 148 | Hideki Okatani | 1 | <1 |
| 148 | Hikari Shimizu | 1 | <1 |
| 148 | Hinata | 1 | <1 |
| 148 | Hyan | 1 | <1 |
| 148 | J.C. Bailey | 1 | <1 |
| 148 | Jado | 1 | <1 |
| 148 | Jervis Cottonbelly | 1 | <1 |
| 148 | Jimmy Lloyd | 1 | <1 |
| 148 | Joe Hendry | 1 | <1 |
| 148 | Johnny Cockstrong | 1 | <1 |
| 148 | Johnny Mundo | 1 | <1 |
| 148 | Jon Murray | 1 | <1 |
| 148 | Judas Draven | 1 | <1 |
| 148 | Kakeru Sekiguchi | 1 | <1 |
| 148 | Kaoru | 1 | <1 |
| 148 | Karate Mummy | 1 | <1 |
| 148 | Keiko Saito | 1 | <1 |
| 148 | Keisuke Masuda | 1 | <1 |
| 148 | Keita Yano | 1 | <1 |
| 148 | Kenshin Chikano | 1 | <1 |
| 148 | Kinoko | 1 | <1 |
| 148 | Kip Sabian | 1 | <1 |
| 148 | Kyoko Inoue | 1 | <1 |
| 148 | Kyoko Kimura | 1 | <1 |
| 148 | La Parka | 1 | <1 |
| 148 | Leonard Takatsu | 1 | <1 |
| 148 | Levi Everrett | 1 | <1 |
| 148 | Lio Rush | 1 | <1 |
| 148 | Macho☆Pump | 1 | <1 |
| 148 | Madman Pondo | 1 | <1 |
| 148 | Makoto | 1 | <1 |
| 148 | Manabu Nakanishi | 1 | <1 |
| 148 | Mansoor | 1 | <1 |
| 148 | Marko Stunt | 1 | <1 |
| 148 | Mason Madden | 1 | <1 |
| 148 | Marty Scurll | 1 | <1 |
| 148 | MARU | 1 | <1 |
| 148 | Mascarita Dorada | 1 | <1 |
| 148 | Matt Caraballo | 1 | <1 |
| 148 | Matt Cross | 1 | <1 |
| 148 | Maxwell Jacob Friedman | 1 | <1 |
| 148 | Maya Yukihi | 1 | <1 |
| 148 | Mia Yim | 1 | <1 |
| 148 | Michael Mamezawa | 1 | <1 |
| 148 | Mika | 1 | <1 |
| 148 | Minoru Fujita | 1 | <1 |
| 148 | Minoru Suzuki | 1 | <1 |
| 148 | Miki Ishii | 1 | <1 |
| 148 | Miu Watanabe | 1 | <1 |
| 148 | Miyawaki | 2 | <1 |
| 148 | Miyuki Maeda | 1 | <1 |
| 148 | Momoka Hanazono | 1 | <1 |
| 148 | MVP | 1 | <1 |
| 148 | Mori Bernard | 1 | <1 |
| 148 | Nodoka-Oneesan | 1 | <1 |
| 148 | Ohashi Dynamite | 1 | <1 |
| 148 | Pat Buck | 1 | <1 |
| 148 | Peter Avalon | 1 | <1 |
| 148 | Pink Tiger | 1 | <1 |
| 148 | Pinkie Sanchez | 1 | <1 |
| 148 | Randy Myers | 1 | <1 |
| 148 | Remi Nagano | 1 | <1 |
| 148 | Rey Mysterio | 1 | <1 |
| 148 | Rey Paloma | 1 | <1 |
| 148 | Rhyno | 1 | <1 |
| 148 | Riara | 1 | <1 |
| 148 | Robbie E | 1 | <1 |
| 148 | Robert Sharpe | 1 | <1 |
| 148 | Royce Isaacs | 1 | <1 |
| 148 | Ryan Nemeth | 1 | <1 |
| 148 | Ryuichi Sekine | 1 | <1 |
| 148 | Sagat | 1 | <1 |
| 148 | Saki | 1 | <1 |
| 148 | Santino Marella | 1 | <1 |
| 148 | Saori Anou | 1 | <1 |
| 148 | Suzume | 1 | <1 |
| 148 | Sexxxy Eddy | 1 | <1 |
| 148 | Scarlett Bordeaux | 1 | <1 |
| 148 | Scott Hall | 1 | <1 |
| 148 | Shayna Baszler | 1 | <1 |
| 148 | "Showa" 80's | 1 | <1 |
| 148 | Steven Pena | 1 | <1 |
| 148 | Su Yung | 1 | <1 |
| 148 | Sumie Sakai | 1 | <1 |
| 148 | Tae Honma | 1 | <1 |
| 148 | Takako Inoue | 1 | <1 |
| 148 | Tsuyoshi Okada | 1 | <1 |
| 148 | Tetsuhiro Kuroda | 1 | <1 |
| 148 | The Sandman | 1 | <1 |
| 148 | Timothy Thatcher | 1 | <1 |
| 148 | Tony Deppen | 1 | <1 |
| 148 | Tsubasa | 1 | <1 |
| 148 | Tsukushi | 1 | <1 |
| 148 | Tsuruhimeka | 1 | <1 |
| 148 | Ultraman Robin | 1 | <1 |
| 148 | Veda Scott | 1 | <1 |
| 148 | Van Vert Jack | 1 | <1 |
| 148 | X-Pac | 1 | <1 |
| 148 | Yoshiaki Yago | 1 | <1 |
| 148 | Yuki Iino | 1 | <1 |
| 148 | Yuki Kamifuku | 1 | <1 |
| 148 | Yumi Ohka | 1 | <1 |
| 148 | Yuna Manase | 1 | <1 |
| 148 | Yuna Mizumori | 1 | <1 |
| 148 | Yusuke Kubo | 1 | <1 |
| 148 | Yusuke Okada | 1 | <1 |
| 148 | Zeus | 1 | <1 |

=== Teams ===
| Rank | Team | No. of reigns | Combined days |
|---|---|---|---|
| 1 | The Young Bucks (Matt Jackson and Nick Jackson) | 1 | 1 |
| 1 | Masanori Kishigawa and Mizuki Takashima | 1 | 1 |
| 3 | 100,000 subscribers to DDT's official YouTube channel | 1 | <1 |
| 3 | Airi Ueda, Minami Tanabe and Shiori Takahashi | 1 | <1 |
| 3 | Beyond Wrestling audience | 1 | <1 |
| 3 | Hiroshi Yamato and Toru Owashi* | 1 | <1 |
| 3 | Mizuki Watase,* Antonio Honda,* Danshoku Dino* and Yukio Naya | 1 | <1 |
| 3 | The Addiction (Christopher Daniels and Frankie Kazarian) | 1 | <1 |

*these reigns are counted within their total reigns listed above

=== Non-wrestlers ===
| Rank | Wrestler | No. of reigns | Combined days |
|---|---|---|---|
| 1 | Ryota Yamasato | 2 | 86 |
| 2 | Akari Suda | 1 | 84 |
| 3 | Sumire Uesaka | 2 | 70 |
| 4 | Keiko Takeshita | 1 | 63 |
| 4 | Kazuki Ohkubo | 1 | 63 |
| 6 | Hyota Echizenya | 1 | 62 |
| 7 | Lingling | 1 | 39 |
| 8 | Juri Suzue | 2 | 28 |
| 9 | Tetsu Inada | 10 | 26¤ |
| 10 | Tetsuya Koda | 4 | 20 |
| 10 | Takeshi Aida | 1 | 20 |
| 12 | Funky Kato | 1 | 10 |
| 13 | Hisaya Imabayashi | 3 | 9 |
| 14 | Kaori Matsumura | 1 | 8 |
| 15 | Kaede | 1 | 7 |
| 15 | Kimihiro | 2 | 7 |
| 15 | Megumi Grace Asano | 1 | 7 |
| 18 | The Great Mampuku | 1 | 3 |
| 19 | Mataro | 1 | 2 |
| 20 | Abe Wakichi | 1 | 1 |
| 20 | Chris Harrington | 1 | 1 |
| 20 | Ryota Sakai | 1 | 1 |
| 23 | Thunder/Hebider/Jakaibo Hebider | 3 | <1 |
| 23 | Jack the Jobber | 2 | <1 |
| 23 | Mrs. Hanzawa of Mexico Tourism | 2 | <1 |
| 23 | Mrs. Matsuzawa | 2 | <1 |
| 23 | Nao Saejima | 2 | <1 |
| 23 | Naomi Susan | 2 | <1 |
| 23 | Rei Takagi | 2 | <1 |
| 23 | A Bolivian boy | 1 | <1 |
| 23 | A chef | 1 | <1 |
| 23 | A taxi driver | 1 | <1 |
| 23 | A television cameraman | 1 | <1 |
| 23 | AD Yamamoto | 1 | <1 |
| 23 | Ai Asakura | 1 | <1 |
| 23 | Aika Sawaguchi | 1 | <1 |
| 23 | Akira Aoki | 1 | <1 |
| 23 | Amanda | 1 | <1 |
| 23 | Ano | 1 | <1 |
| 23 | Asako Galapagos Akita | 1 | <1 |
| 23 | Aya Kajishima | 1 | <1 |
| 23 | Bill Hanstock | 1 | <1 |
| 23 | Brandon Stroud | 1 | <1 |
| 23 | Brian Metz | 1 | <1 |
| 23 | Brian Walters | 1 | <1 |
| 23 | Bryce Remsburg | 1 | <1 |
| 23 | Cutie Elly The Ehime | 1 | <1 |
| 23 | Daisuke Kiso | 1 | <1 |
| 23 | Erika Yamakawa | 1 | <1 |
| 23 | Heppoko Chojin | 1 | <1 |
| 23 | Hidex | 1 | <1 |
| 23 | Hironosuke Izumii | 1 | <1 |
| 23 | Hiroshige | 1 | <1 |
| 23 | Izumi | 1 | <1 |
| 23 | Karin Matoba | 1 | <1 |
| 23 | Kevin Quinn | 1 | <1 |
| 23 | Kukkie! | 1 | <1 |
| 23 | Kumadori | 1 | <1 |
| 23 | Lucky Ikeda | 1 | <1 |
| 23 | Marina Kumamoto | 1 | <1 |
| 23 | Masashi Kakuta | 1 | <1 |
| 23 | Masayuki Okano | 1 | <1 |
| 23 | Michiaki Nakano | 1 | <1 |
| 23 | Mike Kingston | 1 | <1 |
| 23 | Mikey Mickendrow | 1 | <1 |
| 23 | Miki Motoi | 1 | <1 |
| 23 | Misaki Natsumi | 1 | <1 |
| 23 | Momomi Wagatsuma | 1 | <1 |
| 23 | Mone Kitazawa | 1 | <1 |
| 23 | Mr. Sato | 1 | <1 |
| 23 | Natsume Nakayama | 1 | <1 |
| 23 | Punch Tahara | 1 | <1 |
| 23 | Ref Gil | 1 | <1 |
| 23 | Reiji Azuma | 1 | <1 |
| 23 | Reina Seiji | 1 | <1 |
| 23 | Reni Takagi | 1 | <1 |
| 23 | Rick Knox | 1 | <1 |
| 23 | Rikiya Shindo | 1 | <1 |
| 23 | Rio Ohmori | 1 | <1 |
| 23 | Risa Azuma | 1 | <1 |
| 23 | Rise Shiokawa | 1 | <1 |
| 23 | Rise Shirai | 1 | <1 |
| 23 | Ron Funches | 1 | <1 |
| 23 | Sayuri Namba | 1 | <1 |
| 23 | Shimon Nagao | 1 | <1 |
| 23 | Shinji Torigoe | 1 | <1 |
| 23 | Shiori Futaba | 1 | <1 |
| 23 | Shogo Yamamoto | 1 | <1 |
| 23 | Shoppana Yanagiya | 1 | <1 |
| 23 | Sosa with the Cosa | 1 | <1 |
| 23 | Soto Utashiro | 1 | <1 |
| 23 | Sparky Ballard | 1 | <1 |
| 23 | Sugi-chan | 1 | <1 |
| 23 | Tanya Cornell | 1 | <1 |
| 23 | Ted Tanabe | 1 | <1 |
| 23 | Tokihiro Nakamura | 1 | <1 |
| 23 | Tokura Sepa | 1 | <1 |
| 23 | Tomoyuki Kurokawa | 1 | <1 |
| 23 | Toshie Uematsu's father | 1 | <1 |
| 23 | Yui Yoshida | <1 | |
| 23 | Yuka Ogawa | 1 | <1 |
| 23 | Yukinori Matsui | 1 | <1 |
| 23 | Zahrachahiyoni Saito | 1 | <1 |
| 23 | Tomoko Kaneda | 5 | ¤N/A |
| 23 | Tasuku Hatanaka | 4 | ¤N/A |
| 23 | Shun Ebato | 2 | ¤N/A |
| 23 | Sayoko Mita | 1 | ¤N/A |

=== Characters ===
Note: unknown individuals are also listed here

| Rank | Wrestler | No. of reigns | Combined days |
|---|---|---|---|
| 1 | Pokotan | 4 | 71 |
| 2 | Mecha Mummy | 7 | 46 |
| 3 | Guts-Seijin | 1 | 9 |
| 4 | GUDO | 4 | <1 |
| 4 | Jushin Satsugai Liger | 2 | <1 |
| 4 | KENT | 2 | <1 |
| 4 | Para-Para Kuma-san | 2 | <1 |
| 4 | 296 | 1 | <1 |
| 4 | Ikeda Seijin | 1 | <1 |
| 4 | Kawano | 1 | <1 |
| 4 | Dodeka Kuma-san | 1 | <1 |
| 4 | Mecha Mummy Gold | 1 | <1 |
| 4 | Nikolai Gotchanski | 1 | <1 |
| 4 | Norikazu Fujioka | 1 | <1 |
| 4 | Poa Poa | 1 | <1 |
| 4 | Super Stanley | 1 | <1 |
| 4 | "Spider-Man" | 1 | <1 |
| 4 | Takashi Echigo | 1 | <1 |
| 4 | Takashi Niwada | 1 | <1 |
| 4 | Tama | 1 | <1 |
| 4 | World's PK | 1 | <1 |
| 4 | Zeestar | 1 | <1 |
| 4 | Sobie | 1 | ¤N/A |

=== Inanimate objects, animals, etc. ===
| Rank | Wrestler | No. of reigns | Combined days |
|---|---|---|---|
| 1 | Yoshihiko/Sumo Yoshihiko/E.Yoshihiko † | 24 | 512+ |
| 2 | Arnold Skeskejanaker | 4 | 252 |
| 3 | Akihiro | 3 | 122 |
| 4 | The Young Bucks' autobiography Killing the Business | 1 | 74 |
| 5 | | | |
| 6 | Yatchan | 1 | 62 |
| 7 | Cocolo | 1 | 45 |
| 8 | Kotatsu | 3 | 44 |
| 9 | Pokotan's head | 2 | 41 |
| 10 | Saki Akai's photo book Lip Hip Shake | 1 | 14 |
| 11 | Christmas tree | 1 | 10 |
| 12 | The Invisible Man | 1 | 6 |
| 13 | Whip (II) | 1 | 5 |
| 14 | Kasai-shi | 4 | 3 |
| 15 | Bunny | 1 | 2 |
| 16 | Ladder | 3 | <1 |
| 16 | Towel | 3 | <1 |
| 16 | Stefan | 2 | <1 |
| 16 | "Kōmyō" | 1 | <1 |
| 16 | A desk at Shin-Kiba 1st Ring | 1 | <1 |
| 16 | Albret Neklenburg | 1 | <1 |
| 16 | Apple | 1 | <1 |
| 16 | Aufguss towel | 1 | <1 |
| 16 | Aya Kajishima's recorder | 1 | <1 |
| 16 | Baseball bat | 1 | <1 |
| 16 | Beer | 1 | <1 |
| 16 | Big Japan Pro Wrestling ring truck | 1 | <1 |
| 16 | Bunbun | 1 | <1 |
| 16 | Bus | 1 | <1 |
| 16 | Chair | 1 | <1 |
| 16 | Chair (II) | 1 | <1 |
| 16 | Chiba-kun Stuffed Animal | 1 | <1 |
| 16 | Chiririn | 1 | <1 |
| 16 | Contract Signing Document for International Princess Championship | 1 | <1 |
| 16 | D-Oh Grand Prix trophy | 1 | <1 |
| 16 | Danshoku Dino's tights | 1 | <1 |
| 16 | Desk | 1 | <1 |
| 16 | Dish | 1 | <1 |
| 16 | Disposable chopsticks | 1 | <1 |
| 16 | Double vitamin drink | 1 | <1 |
| 16 | Excellent mince cutlet | 1 | <1 |
| 16 | Foot massage mat | 1 | <1 |
| 16 | Gota Ihashi's tights | 1 | <1 |
| 16 | Gota Ihashi's underwear | 1 | <1 |
| 16 | Grilled eel | 1 | <1 |
| 16 | Hisaya Imabayashi's glasses | 1 | <1 |
| 16 | HyperMi Dramatic Dream | 1 | <1 |
| 16 | Ironman Heavymetalweight Championship belt | 1 | <1 |
| 16 | IWGP Junior Heavyweight Championship belt | 1 | <1 |
| 16 | Kagami mochi | 1 | <1 |
| 16 | Ken Ohka's tank top | 1 | <1 |
| 16 | Kitty-chan doll | 1 | <1 |
| 16 | Mah-kun | 1 | <1 |
| 16 | Mahiro Kiryu's Halloween portrait purchaser list | 1 | <1 |
| 16 | Mecha Fist | 1 | <1 |
| 16 | Mitsuboshi curry | 1 | <1 |
| 16 | Paper purchase list | 1 | <1 |
| 16 | Pico Pico Hammer | 1 | <1 |
| 16 | Pom Harajuku's soft drink | 1 | <1 |
| 16 | Pork Bun | 1 | <1 |
| 16 | Pro Wrestling Wave poster | 1 | <1 |
| 16 | Raku's pillow | 1 | <1 |
| 16 | Rice | 1 | <1 |
| 16 | Ringside mat at Ice Ribbon Dojo | 1 | <1 |
| 16 | Rise Shirai's binder | 1 | <1 |
| 16 | Rise Shirai's stopwatch | 1 | <1 |
| 16 | RN: Konyamoanokodenuitarou | 1 | <1 |
| 16 | Shinjuku Face | 1 | <1 |
| 16 | Shohei Ohtani's Let's Play Baseball! Shohei Ohtani Story 2025 Special Edition picture book | 1 | <1 |
| 16 | Tea | 1 | <1 |
| 16 | Trash bin | 1 | <1 |
| 16 | TV Tokyo Camera Crane | 1 | <1 |
| 16 | Unknown foreigner (offscreen) | 1 | <1 |
| 16 | Vince McMahon's Hollywood Walk of Fame star | 1 | <1 |
| 16 | Whip | 1 | <1 |
| 16 | Yakitori | 1 | <1 |
| 16 | Yakitori (II) | 1 | <1 |
| 16 | Yakitori (III) | 1 | <1 |
| 16 | Yellow iPhone 14 | 1 | <1 |

== See also ==
- WWE Hardcore Championship – a title with a similar 24/7 rule
- WWE 24/7 Championship – another title with a similar 24/7 rule
