= Yuki Ishida =

Japanese footballer

Yuki Ishida 石田 祐樹
Personal information
- Full name: Yuki Ishida
- Date of birth: November 4, 1980 (age 46)
- Place of birth: Sapporo, Japan
- Height: 1.78 m (5 ft 10 in)
- Position: Forward

Youth career
- 1996–1998: Sapporo Shiraishi High School
- 1999–2002: Dohto University

Senior career*
Years	Team	Apps	(Gls)
2003–2005	Shonan Bellmare	34	(0)
2005–2009	Tokushima Vortis	159	(22)
2010	Matsumoto Yamaga FC	23	(9)
2011–2012	Fujieda MYFC	39	(14)
Total		255	(45)
- * Club domestic league appearances and goals

Yuki Ishida (石田 祐樹, Ishida Yūki; born November 4, 1980) is a former Japanese football player.

== Career statistics ==
Appearances and goals by club, season and competition
Club	Season	League			Emperor's Cup		Total	
Club	Season	Division	Apps	Goals	Apps	Goals	Apps	Goals
Shonan Bellmare	2003	J2 League	19	0	4	1	23	1
Shonan Bellmare	2004	J2 League	15	0	0	0	15	0
Shonan Bellmare	2005	J2 League	0	0	0	0	0	0
Tokushima Vortis	2005	J2 League	12	1	1	0	13	1
Tokushima Vortis	2006	J2 League	37	1	1	0	38	1
Tokushima Vortis	2007	J2 League	30	6	2	0	32	6
Tokushima Vortis	2008	J2 League	31	7	1	0	32	7
Tokushima Vortis	2009	J2 League	49	7	1	0	50	7
Matsumoto Yamaga	2010	JFL	23	9	1	0	24	9
Fujieda MYFC	2011	JRL (Tōkai)	13	11	—		13	11
Fujieda MYFC	2012	JFL	26	3	—		26	3
Career total			255	45	11	1	266	46
