= List of Ironman Heavymetalweight Champions (2010–2019) =

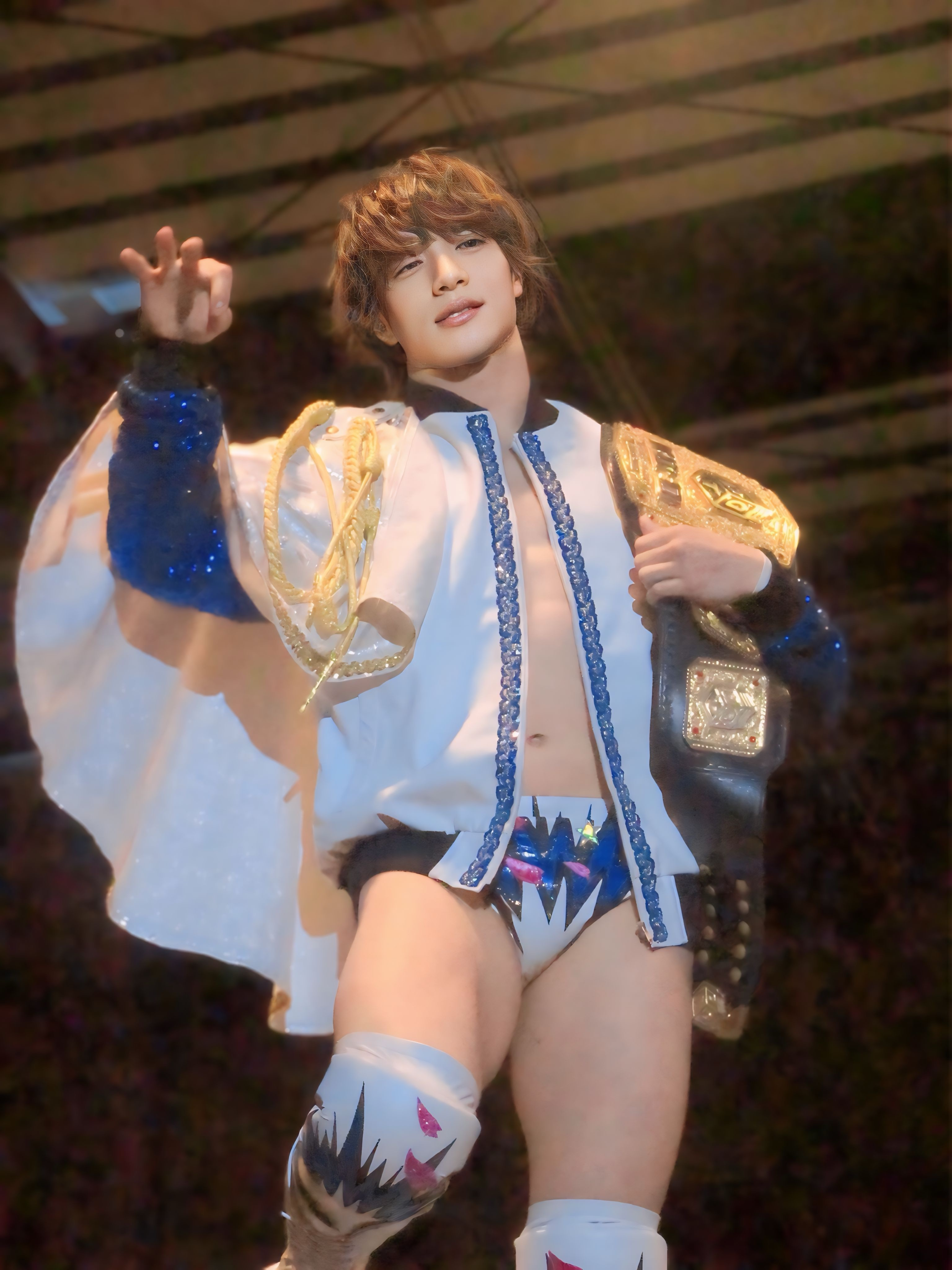
Twelve-time champion Yuki Ueno.

The Ironman Heavymetalweight Championship (Japanese: アイアンマンヘビーメタル級王座, Hepburn: Aianman Hebīmetaru-kyū Ōza) is a professional wrestling championship created and promoted by the Japanese promotion DDT Pro-Wrestling (DDT). Open to anyone, regardless of gender or DDT employment status, the championship is defended "24/7", as in any time, anywhere, as long as a referee is there to confirm the win. Because of this rule, not only is the championship winnable regardless of gender or number of individuals (in case of a common pinfall or submission), it is also available to "unconventional" champions such as animals or inanimate objects, with title changes regularly occurring outside of regular shows, often with videos posted on the promotion's social media accounts. It was created as a parody of the defunct WWE Hardcore Championship, which also had a "24/7 rule".

The championship was introduced on the June 29, 2000 TV taping, during which Poison Julie Sawada created the title and awarded it to himself, only to lose it in under three minutes after Mitsunobu Kikuzawa attacked him with the belt and successfully pinned him.

As of August 14, 2026, there have been 1,899 officially recognized reigns between 462 different human individuals, 8 teams and 66 inanimate objects and animals. The record for most reigns is held by Shinobu, who won it 216 times, including by trading the title back-and-forth with 215-time champion Yuko Miyamoto a total of 303 times on the same night. Danshoku Dino holds the record for longest combined reign with at least 534 days and counting (the exact date of when he won his tenth title is uncertain). Masa Takanashi's sixth reign is the longest singular reign at 333 days. Only 166 individuals have held the title for longer than a day. The title has occasionally been won by unusual means, such as an auction for the belt, rock paper scissors, and even a title change that occurred in a dream.

Non-wrestlers to have held the title include AV idol Nao Saejima, voice actors Sumire Uesaka and Tasuku Hatanaka, TV personality LiLiCo, J-pop idols Akari Suda, Kaori Matsumura, Rise Shiokawa, Aika Sawaguchi, Misaki Natsumi, Momomi Wagatsuma and Lingling, Tokyo Metropolitan Assemblyman Shinichiro Kawamatsu, a cat named Bunny, a monkey, a three-time champion ladder, Vince McMahon's Hollywood Walk of Fame star, a copy of The Young Bucks' autobiography Killing the Business, and the title belt itself.

== Title history ==
Key
No.	Overall reign number
Reign	Reign number for the specific champion
Days	Number of days held
N/A	Unknown information
(NLT)	Championship change took place "no later than" the date listed
<1	Reign lasted less than a day
+	Current reign is changing daily

No.	Champion	Championship change			Reign statistics		Notes	Ref.
No.	Champion	Date	Event	Location	Reign	Days	Notes	Ref.
828	Munenori Sawa	January 10, 2010	New Year! Fierce Tiger Style Great Fart Cannon in Nagoya 2010	Nagoya, Japan	3	<1		
829	Thanomsak Toba	January 10, 2010	New Year! Fierce Tiger Style Great Fart Cannon in Nagoya 2010	Nagoya, Japan	4	<1		
830	Shigehiro Irie	January 10, 2010	New Year! Fierce Tiger Style Great Fart Cannon in Nagoya 2010	Nagoya, Japan	1	<1		
831	Hikaru Sato	January 10, 2010	New Year! Fierce Tiger Style Great Fart Cannon in Nagoya 2010	Nagoya, Japan	1	41		
832	Michael Nakazawa	February 20, 2010	House show	Tokyo, Japan	6	8		
833	Kazuki Hirata	February 28, 2010	Dramatic 2010 February Special	Tokyo, Japan	1	14		
834	Keisuke Ishii	March 14, 2010	Judgement 2010	Tokyo, Japan	1	7		
835	Munenori Sawa	March 21, 2010	Dōtonbori Story 6	Osaka, Japan	4	<1		
836	Masa Takanashi	March 21, 2010	Dōtonbori Story 6	Osaka, Japan	5	6	Previously won the title as Masahiro Mekanashi and Poco Takanashi.	
837	Danshoku Dino	March 27, 2010	3.27 All Night DDT	Tokyo, Japan	17	25	This was a 3-on-1 handicap match in which Dino teamed with Hikaru Sato and Keisuke Ishii against Masa Takanashi.	
838	Yukihiro Abe	April 21, 2010	Non-Fix 4.21	Tokyo, Japan	1	<1	This was a three-way match.	
839	Yasu Urano	April 21, 2010	Non-Fix 4.21	Tokyo, Japan	2	<1	This was a three-way match.	
840	Yukihiro Abe	April 21, 2010	Non-Fix 4.21	Tokyo, Japan	2	<1	This was a three-way match.	
841	Danshoku Dino	April 21, 2010	Non-Fix 4.21	Tokyo, Japan	18	45		
842	Masa Takanashi	June 5, 2010	House show	Tokyo, Japan	6	333	The longest individual reign.	
843	Keisuke Ishii	May 4, 2011	Max Bump 2011	Tokyo, Japan	2	<1		
844	Masa Takanashi	May 4, 2011	Max Bump 2011	Tokyo, Japan	7	42		
845	Emi Sakura	June 15, 2011	House show	Warabi, Japan	3	<1		
846	Remi Nagano	June 15, 2011	House show	Warabi, Japan	1	<1		
847	Hikari Minami	June 15, 2011	House show	Warabi, Japan	3	<1		
848	Emi Sakura	June 15, 2011	House show	Warabi, Japan	4	<1		
849	Masa Takanashi	June 15, 2011	House show	Warabi, Japan	8	3		
850	Keisuke Ishii	June 18, 2011	House show	Tokyo, Japan	3	<1		
851	Ken Ohka	June 18, 2011	House show	Tokyo, Japan	8	<1		
852	Masa Takanashi	June 18, 2011	House show	Tokyo, Japan	9	1		
853	Keisuke Ishii	June 19, 2011	House show	Tokyo, Japan	4	<1		
854	Masa Takanashi	June 19, 2011	House show	Tokyo, Japan	10	<1		
855	SeXXXy Eddy	June 19, 2011	House show	Tokyo, Japan	1	<1		
856	Keisuke Ishii	June 19, 2011	House show	Tokyo, Japan	5	7		
857	Jado	June 26, 2011	House show	Osaka, Japan	1	<1		
858	Danshoku Dino	June 26, 2011	House show	Osaka, Japan	19	4		
859	Masa Takanashi	June 30, 2011	House show	Tokyo, Japan	11	<1	Championship changes take place during a 7-team gauntlet match.	
860	Yasu Urano	June 30, 2011	House show	Tokyo, Japan	3	3	Championship changes take place during a 7-team gauntlet match.	
861	Antonio Honda	July 3, 2011	House show	Tokyo, Japan	3	<1		
862	Daisuke Sasaki	July 3, 2011	House show	Tokyo, Japan	1	<1		
863	Antonio Honda	July 3, 2011	House show	Tokyo, Japan	4	7		
864	Daisuke Sasaki	July 10, 2011	House show	Nagoya, Japan	2	<1		
865	Tsuyoshi Kikuchi	July 10, 2011	House show	Nagoya, Japan	1	<1		
866	Ultraman Robin	July 10, 2011	House show	Nagoya, Japan	1	<1	Won the title by pinning Kikuchi in a tag team match.	
867	Tsuyoshi Kikuchi	July 10, 2011	House show	Nagoya, Japan	2	<1		
868	Antonio Honda	July 10, 2011	House show	Nagoya, Japan	5	11		
869	Daisuke Sasaki	July 21, 2011	House show	Tokyo, Japan	3	3		
870	Antonio Honda	July 24, 2011	Ryōgoku Peter Pan 2011	Tokyo, Japan	6	<1	This was a 15-man Ironman Rumble, which Honda won by last eliminating Sasaki.	
871	Gorgeous Matsuno	July 24, 2011	Ryōgoku Peter Pan 2011	Tokyo, Japan	8	35		
872	Michael Nakazawa	August 28, 2011	House show	Tokyo, Japan	7	<1	Took place during a battle royal.	
873	Yasu Urano	August 28, 2011	House show	Tokyo, Japan	4	<1		
874	Gorgeous Matsuno	August 28, 2011	House show	Tokyo, Japan	9	<1		
875	DJ Nira	August 28, 2011	House show	Tokyo, Japan	3	<1		
876	Michael Nakazawa	August 28, 2011	House show	Tokyo, Japan	8	<1		
877	Gorgeous Matsuno	August 28, 2011	House show	Tokyo, Japan	10	91		
878	Shigehiro Irie	November 27, 2011	House show	Tokyo, Japan	2	32	Took place during a tag team match, where Keisuke Ishi was Irie's partner and Poison Julie Sawada was Matsuno's.	
879	Kanjyuro Matsuyama	December 29, 2011	House show	Osaka, Japan	1	1		
880	Tigers Mask	December 30, 2011	House show	Osaka, Japan	1	1	This was a 3-way match also involving Naoki Setoguchi.	
881	Takoyakida	December 31, 2011	House show	Osaka, Japan	1	2		
882	Ebessan (III)	January 2, 2012	House show	Osaka, Japan	1	3	AKA independent wrestler Osamu Suganuma, inheritor of Kikutaro's previous gimmick	
883	Apple Miyuki	January 5, 2012	House show	Osaka, Japan	2	2		
884	Kuishinbo Kamen	January 7, 2012	House show	Osaka, Japan	1	1		
885	Black Buffalo	January 8, 2012	House show	Osaka, Japan	4	4	This was a 3-way match also involving Billy Ken Kid. Buffalo previously held the title under the name Taiyo Rojo.	
886	Miyuki Matsuyama	January 12, 2012	House show	Osaka, Japan	3	49	Took place during a tag team match, where Kanjyuro Matsuyama was Matsuyama's partner and Tigers Mask was Buffalo's. She was previously known as Apple Miyuki.	
887	Ebessan (III)	March 1, 2012	House show	Osaka, Japan	2	<1	This was a 3-way match also involving Miracle Man.	
888	Kanjyuro Matsuyama	March 1, 2012	House show	Osaka, Japan	2	1		
889	Tigers Mask	March 2, 2012	House show	Osaka, Japan	2	2	This was a 3-way match also involving Atsushi Kotoge.	
890	Miyawaki	March 4, 2012	House show	Osaka, Japan	1	<1		
891	Antonio Honda	March 4, 2012	House show	Osaka, Japan	7	<1	Took place during a 10-minutes Iron Man match.	
892	Miyawaki	March 4, 2012	House show	Osaka, Japan	2	<1	Took place during a 10-minutes Iron Man match.	
893	Antonio Honda	March 4, 2012	House show	Osaka, Japan	8	7		
894	Poison Julie Sawada	March 11, 2012	House show	Tokyo, Japan	7	<1	Took place during a battle royal.	
895	Michael Nakazawa	March 11, 2012	House show	Tokyo, Japan	9	<1		
896	Kana	March 11, 2012	House show	Tokyo, Japan	1	<1		
897	Antonio Honda	March 11, 2012	House show	Tokyo, Japan	9	<1		
898	Kana	March 11, 2012	House show	Tokyo, Japan	2	28		
899	Michael Nakazawa	April 8, 2012	House show	Tokyo, Japan	10	<1	Took place during a 10-minutes ironman battle royal.	
900	Kana	April 8, 2012	House show	Tokyo, Japan	3	<1		
901	Keita Yano	April 8, 2012	House show	Tokyo, Japan	1	<1		
902	Kana	April 8, 2012	House show	Tokyo, Japan	4	<1		
903	Michael Nakazawa	April 8, 2012	House show	Tokyo, Japan	11	<1		
904	Kana	April 8, 2012	House show	Tokyo, Japan	5	22		
905	Ayumi Kurihara	April 30, 2012	House show	Tokyo, Japan	1	34		
906	Hiroshi Fukuda	June 3, 2012	House show	Tokyo, Japan	1	<1		
907	Hoshitango	June 3, 2012	House show	Tokyo, Japan	3	<1		
908	Michael Nakazawa	June 3, 2012	House show	Tokyo, Japan	12	<1		
909	Ayumi Kurihara	June 3, 2012	House show	Tokyo, Japan	2	5		
910	Mio Shirai	June 8, 2012	House show	Tokyo, Japan	1	2		
911	Hiroyo Matsumoto	June 10, 2012	House show	Tokyo, Japan	1	3		
912	Tsukasa Fujimoto	June 13, 2012	House show	Saitama, Japan	1	10		
913	Tsukushi	June 23, 2012	House show	Warabi, Saitama, Japan	1	<1		
914	Ringside mat at Ice Ribbon dojo	June 23, 2012	House show	Warabi, Saitama, Japan	1	<1		
915	Tsukasa Fujimoto	June 23, 2012	House show	Warabi, Saitama, Japan	2	1		
916	Hiroshi Fukuda	June 24, 2012	House show	Tokyo, Japan	2	<1		
917	Thanomsak Toba	June 24, 2012	House show	Tokyo, Japan	5	<1		
918	Tsukasa Fujimoto	June 24, 2012	House show	Tokyo, Japan	3	<1		
919	Choun Shiryu	June 24, 2012	House show	Tokyo, Japan	2	6		
920	DJ Nira	June 30, 2012	House show	Tokyo, Japan	4	<1		
921	Choun Shiryu	July 24, 2011	House show	Tokyo, Japan	3	12		
922	Yuki Sato	July 12, 2012	House show	Tokyo, Japan	1	7		
923	Dick Togo	July 19, 2012	House show	Bolivia	2	1	First title change to take place outside of Japan.	
924	Ajayu	July 20, 2012	House show	Bolivia	1	2	Bolivian pro wrestler.	
925	Yuki Sato	July 22, 2012	House show	Bolivia	2	<1		
926	A Bolivian boy	July 22, 2012	House show	Bolivia	1	<1		
927	Dick Togo	July 22, 2012	House show	Bolivia	3	2		
928	Yuki Sato	July 24, 2012	House show	Bolivia	3	5		
929	Choun Shiryu	July 29, 2012	House show	Tokyo, Japan	4	<1		
930	Hiroshi Fukuda	July 29, 2012	House show	Tokyo, Japan	3	<1	Took place during a battle royal.	
931	Akito	July 29, 2012	House show	Tokyo, Japan	1	<1	Took place during a battle royal.	
932	Choun Shiryu	July 29, 2012	House show	Tokyo, Japan	5	<1	Took place during a battle royal.	
933	Yuki Sato	July 29, 2012	House show	Tokyo, Japan	4	<1	Took place during a battle royal.	
934	Hiroshi Fukuda	July 29, 2012	House show	Tokyo, Japan	4	<1	Took place during a battle royal.	
935	Gorgeous Matsuno	July 29, 2012	House show	Tokyo, Japan	11	<1		
936	Makoto Oishi	July 29, 2012	House show	Tokyo, Japan	1	<1		
937	Hiroshi Fukuda	July 29, 2012	House show	Tokyo, Japan	5	<1		
938	Gorgeous Matsuno	July 29, 2012	House show	Tokyo, Japan	12	1		
939	Mio Shirai	July 30, 2012	House show	Tokyo, Japan	2	<1	Pinned Matsuno in a 4-way tag team match, also involving Ryo Mizunami as Shirai's partner, Rion Mizuki as Matsuno's, and the teams of Saoshi Sano and Batten Tamagawa, and Go Shiofuki and Kinteki Sakuragaoka.	
940	Gentaro	July 30, 2012	House show	Tokyo, Japan	4	<1		
941	Michael Mamezawa	July 30, 2012	House show	Tokyo, Japan	1	<1	Alter-ego of Mame Endo.	
942	Hiroshi Fukuda	July 30, 2012	House show	Tokyo, Japan	6	1		
943	Gota Ihashi	July 31, 2012	House show	Tokyo, Japan	1	1		
944	Hiroshi Fukuda	August 1, 2012	House show	Tokyo, Japan	7	1		
945	Rikiya Shindo	August 2, 2012	House show	Tokyo, Japan	1	<1	Ring announcer.	
946	Hiroshi Fukuda	August 2, 2012	House show	Tokyo, Japan	8	1		
947	Yakitori	August 3, 2012	House show	Tokyo, Japan	1	<1		
948	Ryuichi Sekine	August 3, 2012	House show	Tokyo, Japan	1	<1		
949	Beer	August 3, 2012	House show	Tokyo, Japan	1	<1		
950	Gota Ihashi	August 3, 2012	House show	Tokyo, Japan	2	<1		
951	Hiroshi Fukuda	August 3, 2012	House show	Tokyo, Japan	9	1		
952	Konosuke Takeshita	August 4, 2012	House show	Tokyo, Japan	1	<1		
953	Hiroshi Fukuda	August 4, 2012	House show	Tokyo, Japan	10	<1		
954	DJ Nira	August 4, 2012	House show	Tokyo, Japan	5	5		
955	Hiroshi Fukuda	August 9, 2012	House show	Tokyo, Japan	11	<1		
956	Chair	August 9, 2012	House show	Tokyo, Japan	1	<1		
957	Hiroshi Fukuda	August 9, 2012	House show	Tokyo, Japan	12	<1		
958	Cherry	August 9, 2012	House show	Tokyo, Japan	8	<1		
959	DJ Nira	August 9, 2012	House show	Tokyo, Japan	6	9		
960	E.Yoshihiko	August 18, 2012	Budokan Peter Pan	Tokyo, Japan	5	<1	Took place during a Royal Rumble. Formerly held the title under the name Yoshihiko.	
961	Yoshiaki Fujiwara	August 18, 2012	Budokan Peter Pan	Tokyo, Japan	1	138	Took place during a Royal Rumble.	
962	E.Yoshihiko	January 3, 2013	House show	Tokyo, Japan	6	171		
963	Gorgeous Matsuno	June 23, 2013	House show	Tokyo, Japan	13	<1	Took place during a 9-man 10-minutes battle royal.	
964	Masa Takanashi	June 23, 2013	House show	Tokyo, Japan	12	<1		
965	Tomomitsu Matsunaga	June 23, 2013	House show	Tokyo, Japan	1	<1		
966	Soma Takao	June 23, 2013	House show	Tokyo, Japan	1	<1		
967	Mikami	June 23, 2013	House show	Tokyo, Japan	11	<1		
968	Tomomitsu Matsunaga	June 23, 2013	House show	Tokyo, Japan	2	<1		
969	Michael Nakazawa	June 23, 2013	House show	Tokyo, Japan	13	<1		
970	Yoshihiko	June 23, 2013	House show	Tokyo, Japan	7	<1		
971	DJ Nira	June 23, 2013	House show	Tokyo, Japan	7	<1		
972	"Kōmyō"	June 23, 2013	House show	Tokyo, Japan	1	56	A calligraphy by singer and actor Akihiro Miwa. Took place during a 9-man 10-minutes battle royal.	
973	DJ Nira	August 18, 2013	Ryōgoku Peter Pan 2013	Tokyo, Japan	8	<1	Took place during a Royal Rumble.	
974	Akihiro	August 18, 2013	Ryōgoku Peter Pan 2013	Tokyo, Japan	2	42	A sex doll.	
975	Kudo	September 29, 2013	House show	Tokyo, Japan	2	14	Pinned Akihiro during a battle royal.	
976	Danshoku Dino	October 13, 2013	House show	Sapporo, Japan	20	7	Took place during a tag team match, with Makoto Oishi as Dino's partner and Harashima as Kudo's.	
977	Harashima	October 20, 2013	House show	Tokyo, Japan	2	56	This was also for Harashima's KO-D Openweight Championship. Harashima previously won the title as Hero!	
978	Yukio Sakaguchi	December 15, 2013	House show	Fukuoka, Japan	1	8	Took place during a tag team match, with Mokoto Oishi as Dino's partner and Harashima as Kudo's. Sakaguchi won by referee stoppage.	
979	Harashima	December 23, 2013	House show	Tokyo, Japan	3	21	This was also for Harashima's KO-D Openweight Championship.	
980	Masa Takanashi	January 13, 2014	House show	Tokyo, Japan	13	13		
981	Tomomitsu Matsunaga	January 26, 2014	House show	Tokyo, Japan	3	<1	Took place during a battle royal.	
982	Guanchulo	January 26, 2014	House show	Tokyo, Japan	1	<1		
983	Gota Ihashi	January 26, 2014	House show	Tokyo, Japan	3	<1		
984	Kazuki Hirata	January 26, 2014	House show	Tokyo, Japan	2	<1		
985	Michael Nakazawa	January 26, 2014	House show	Tokyo, Japan	14	<1		
986	Hoshitango	January 26, 2014	House show	Tokyo, Japan	4	<1		
987	Yasu Urano	January 26, 2014	House show	Tokyo, Japan	5	<1		
988	Masa Takanashi	January 26, 2014	House show	Tokyo, Japan	14	<1		
989	Yasu Urano	January 26, 2014	House show	Tokyo, Japan	6	28		
990	Emi Sakura	February 23, 2014	House show	Tokyo, Japan	5	<1	Took place during a battle royal.	
991	DJ Nira	February 23, 2014	House show	Tokyo	9	<1		
992	Akito	February 23, 2014	House show	Tokyo, Japan	2	<1		
993	Daichi Kakimoto	February 23, 2014	House show	Tokyo, Japan	3	<1		
994	Kazuki Hirata	February 23, 2014	House show	Tokyo, Japan	3	14		
995	Daisuke Sasaki	March 9, 2014	House show	Tokyo, Japan	4	<1	Took place during a battle royal.	
996	DJ Nira	March 9, 2014	House show	Tokyo, Japan	10	<1		
997	Makoto Oishi	March 9, 2014	House show	Tokyo, Japan	2	<1		
998	Kazuki Hirata	March 9, 2014	House show	Tokyo, Japan	4	<1		
999	Sanshiro Takagi	March 9, 2014	House show	Tokyo, Japan	9	51		
1000	Ironman title belt	April 29, 2014	Max Bump 2014	Tokyo, Japan	1	<1	Takagi attempted to retire the championship, but was knocked out by Poison Sawada with the belt; as Takagi fell with the belt on his chest, the referee counted the pinfall, making the belt itself the champion.	
1001	Jun Akiyama	April 29, 2014	Max Bump 2014	Tokyo, Japan	1	18		
1002	Masao Inoue	May 17, 2014	House show	Kasukabe, Japan	1	<1		
1003	Jun Akiyama	May 17, 2014	House show	Kasukabe, Japan	2	8		
1004	Masao Inoue	May 25, 2014	AJPW Super Power Series 2014	Tokyo, Japan	2	<1	Pinned Akiyama during a six-man battle royal also involving Menso-re Oyaji, Sushi, Zeus and Kaji Tomato.	
1005	Jun Akiyama	May 25, 2014	AJPW Super Power Series 2014	Chiba, Japan	3	4		
1006	Akihiro	May 29, 2014	House show	Tokyo, Japan	3	80		
1007	DJ Nira	August 17, 2014	Ryōgoku Peter Pan 2014	Tokyo, Japan	11	<1	Took place during a Rumble rules match.	
1008	Gorgeous Matsuno	August 17, 2014	Ryōgoku Peter Pan 2014	Tokyo, Japan	14	<1		
1009	LiLiCo	August 17, 2014	Ryōgoku Peter Pan 2014	Tokyo, Japan	1	128	A TV personality who was the special guest ring announcer for the Rumble match.	
1010	Yoshihiko	December 23, 2014	House show	Tokyo, Japan	8	11		
1011	Saki Akai	January 3, 2015	House show	Tokyo, Japan	1	<1	Took place during a 6-man tag team match, with Masa Takanashi and D.J. Nira as Akai's partners, and Antonio Honda and Soma Takao as Yoshihiko's.	
1012	Aja Kong	January 3, 2015	House show	Tokyo, Japan	2	43		
1013	Yusuke Kubo	February 15, 2015	Saitama Super DDT 2015	Saitama, Japan	1	<1		
1014	Shunma Katsumata	February 15, 2015	Saitama Super DDT 2015	Saitama, Japan	1	<1	Took place during a battle royal.	
1015	Hikaru Sato	February 15, 2015	Saitama Super DDT 2015	Saitama, Japan	2	<1	Took place during a battle royal.	
1016	Soma Takao	February 15, 2015	Saitama Super DDT 2015	Saitama, Japan	2	<1	Took place during a battle royal.	
1017	Zeus	February 15, 2015	Saitama Super DDT 2015	Saitama, Japan	1	<1	Took place during a battle royal.	
1018	Tomomitsu Matsunaga	February 15, 2015	Saitama Super DDT 2015	Saitama, Japan	4	<1	Took place during a battle royal.	
1019	Makoto Oishi	February 15, 2015	Saitama Super DDT 2015	Saitama, Japan	3	<1	Took place during a battle royal.	
1020	Aja Kong	February 15, 2015	Saitama Super DDT 2015	Saitama, Japan	3	254	Took place during a battle royal.	
1021	Cherry	October 27, 2015	House show	Tokyo, Japan	9	3		
1022	Fairy Nihonbashi	October 30, 2015	House show	Tokyo, Japan	1	<1		
1023	Moeka Haruhi	October 30, 2015	House show	Tokyo, Japan	3	<1		
1024	Cherry	October 30, 2015	House show	Tokyo, Japan	10	9		
1025	Tomomitsu Matsunaga	November 8, 2015	House show	Kasukabe, Japan	5	<1	Took place during a battle royal.	
1026	Cherry	November 8, 2015	House show	Kasukabe, Japan	11	<1		
1027	Toru Owashi	November 8, 2015	House show	Kasukabe, Japan	2	<1		
1028	Ladybeard	November 8, 2015	House show	Kasukabe, Japan	1	<1		
1029	Tomomitsu Matsunaga	November 8, 2015	House show	Kasukabe, Japan	6	<1		
1030	Cherry	November 8, 2015	House show	Kasukabe, Japan	12	<1		
1031	Toru Owashi	November 8, 2015	House show	Kasukabe, Japan	3	<1		
1032	Ladybeard	November 8, 2015	House show	Kasukabe, Japan	2	<1		
1033	Tomomitsu Matsunaga	November 8, 2015	House show	Kasukabe, Japan	7	<1		
1034	Cherry	November 8, 2015	House show	Kasukabe, Japan	13	<1		
1035	Tomomitsu Matsunaga	November 8, 2015	House show	Kasukabe, Japan	8	<1		
1036	Toru Owashi	November 8, 2015	House show	Kasukabe, Japan	4	<1		
1037	Ladybeard	November 8, 2015	House show	Kasukabe, Japan	3	<1		
1038	Cherry	November 8, 2015	House show	Kasukabe, Japan	14	<1		
1039	Makoto Oishi	November 8, 2015	House show	Kasukabe, Japan	4	<1		
1040	Suguru Miyatake	November 8, 2015	House show	Kasukabe, Japan	1	<1		
1041	Kazuki Hirata	November 8, 2015	House show	Kasukabe, Japan	5	<1		
1042	Makoto Oishi	November 8, 2015	House show	Kasukabe, Japan	5	<1		
1043	Cherry	November 8, 2015	House show	Kasukabe, Japan	15	10		
1044	Makoto Oishi	November 18, 2015	House show	Tokyo, Japan	6	<1		
1045	Toru Owashi	November 18, 2015	House show	Tokyo, Japan	5	<1		
1046	Kazuki Hirata	November 18, 2015	House show	Tokyo, Japan	6	<1		
1047	Masa Takanashi	November 18, 2015	House show	Tokyo, Japan	15	<1		
1048	Suguru Miyatake	November 18, 2015	House show	Tokyo, Japan	2	<1		
1049	Shunma Katsumata	November 18, 2015	House show	Tokyo, Japan	2	<1		
1050	Cherry	November 18, 2015	House show	Tokyo, Japan	16	<1		
1051	Gota Ihashi	November 18, 2015	House show	Tokyo, Japan	4	<1		
1052	Gota Ihashi's tights	November 18, 2015	House show	Tokyo, Japan	1	<1		
1053	Cherry	November 18, 2015	House show	Tokyo, Japan	17	1		
1054	Asako Galápagos Akita	November 19, 2015	Tokyo Sports offices	Tokyo, Japan	1	<1	Editor for the Tokyo Sports newspaper.	
1055	Cherry	November 19, 2015	Tokyo Sports offices	Tokyo, Japan	18	9		
1056	Kikutaro	November 28, 2015	House show	Osaka, Japan	6	<1	Took place during a battle royal.	
1057	Shunma Katsumata	November 28, 2015	House show	Osaka, Japan	3	<1	Took place during a battle royal.	
1058	Kazuki Hirata	November 28, 2015	House show	Osaka, Japan	7	<1	Took place during a battle royal.	
1059	Toru Owashi	November 28, 2015	House show	Osaka, Japan	6	<1	Took place during a battle royal.	
1060	Yoshihiko	November 28, 2015	House show	Osaka, Japan	9	<1	Took place during a battle royal.	
1061	Suguru Miyatake	November 28, 2015	House show	Osaka, Japan	3	<1	Took place during a battle royal.	
1062	Gota Ihashi	November 28, 2015	House show	Osaka, Japan	5	<1	Took place during a battle royal.	
1063	Gota Ihashi's underwear	November 28, 2015	House show	Osaka, Japan	1	<1	Took place during a battle royal.	
1064	Cherry	November 28, 2015	House show	Osaka, Japan	19	<1	Took place during a battle royal.	
1065	Saki Akai	November 28, 2015	House show	Osaka, Japan	2	15	Took place during a battle royal.	
1066	Cherry	December 13, 2015	House show	Fukuoka, Japan	20	<1	Took place during a battle royal.	
1067	Makoto Oishi	December 13, 2015	House show	Fukuoka, Japan	7	<1		
1068	Van Vert Jack	December 13, 2015	House show	Fukuoka, Japan	1	<1		
1069	Hiroshi Fukuda	December 13, 2015	House show	Fukuoka, Japan	13	<1		
1070	Saki Akai	December 13, 2015	House show	Fukuoka, Japan	3	21		
1071	LiLiCo	January 3, 2016	House show	Tokyo, Japan	2	112		
1072	Saki Akai	April 24, 2016	Max Bump 2016	Tokyo, Japan	4	27	This was a tag team match in which Akai, teaming with Makoto Oishi, pinned LiLiCo who was teaming with Mizuki Watase.	
1073	Joey Ryan	May 21, 2016	House show	Kasukabe, Japan	1	22		
1074	Rey Mysterio Jr.	June 12, 2016	House show	Boyle Heights, CA	1	<1		
1075	Joey Ryan	June 12, 2016	House show	Boyle Heights, CA	2	5		
1076	Chuck Taylor	June 17, 2016	House show	Des Moines, IA	1	<1		
1077	Scott Hall	June 17, 2016	House show	Des Moines, IA	1	<1		
1078	Colt Cabana	June 17, 2016	House show	Des Moines, IA	1	<1	Won the title by forfeit after tricking Scott Hall into saying "I give up" off a sheet of paper.	
1079	Joey Ryan	June 17, 2016	House show	Des Moines, IA	3	3		
1080	Kikutaro	June 20, 2016	House show	Los Angeles, CA	7	<1		
1081	Laura James	June 20, 2016	House show	Los Angeles, CA	1	1		
1082	Bunny	June 21, 2016	House show	Los Angeles, CA	1	2	A cat.	
1083	Ryan Nemeth	June 23, 2016	House show	Los Angeles, CA	1	<1	Won the title by trading it with Bunny for a cat treat.	
1084	Taya Valkyrie	June 23, 2016	House show	Hollywood, CA	1	2		
1085	John Morrison	June 25, 2016	House show	Boyle Heights, CA	1	<1		
1086	Ricochet	June 25, 2016	House show	Boyle Heights, CA	1	1		
1087	Brian Metz	June 26, 2016	House show	Boyle Heights, CA	1	<1	Lucha Underground production employee. Won by tricking Ricochet into signing a document giving the title to Metz.	
1088	Matt Striker	June 26, 2016	House show	Boyle Heights, CA	1	<1		
1089	Cheerleader Melissa	June 26, 2016	House show	Boyle Heights, CA	1	<1		
1090	Matt Cross	June 26, 2016	House show	Boyle Heights, CA	1	<1		
1091	Brian Cage	June 26, 2016	House show	Boyle Heights, CA	1	1		
1092	Joey Ryan	June 27, 2016	House show	Boyle Heights, CA	4	2		
1093	Alacrana Plata #2	June 29, 2016	House show	Venice, CA	2	9	Previously won the title as Laura James.	
1094	Buggy Nova	July 8, 2016	House show	Corona, CA	1	<1		
1095	Joey Ryan	July 8, 2016	House show	Corona, CA	5	1		
1096	Scarlett Bordeaux	July 9, 2016	House show	Detroit, MI	1	<1		
1097	Rhyno	July 9, 2016	House show	Detroit, MI	1	<1	In a match defending the title against Rhino, Bordeaux forfeited the title in exchange for Rhyno's autograph.	
1098	Robbie E	July 9, 2016	House show	Detroit, MI	1	<1	This was a ladder match.	
1099	Joey Ryan	July 9, 2016	House show	Detroit, MI	6	1	Won the title by trading it with Robbie E for toilet paper.	
1100	Timothy Thatcher	July 10, 2016	House show	Oxnard, CA	1	<1		
1101	Drew Gulak	July 10, 2016	House show	Oxnard, CA	1	<1		
1102	Eli Drake	July 10, 2016	House show	Oxnard, CA	1	<1		
1103	Jervis Cottonbelly	July 10, 2016	House show	Oxnard, CA	1	<1	Won due to Drake asking Cottonbelly to stop tickling him, which the referee counted as a submission.	
1104	Joey Ryan	July 10, 2016	House show	Oxnard, CA	7	7	Won the title by trading it with Cottonbelly for the company of two women.	
1105	Brian Kendrick	July 17, 2016	House show	Moorpark, CA	1	<1		
1106	Joey Ryan	July 17, 2016	House show	Moorpark, CA	8	5		
1107	"Spider-Man"	July 22, 2016	San Diego Comic-Con	San Diego, CA	1	<1	A person cosplaying as Spider-Man.	
1108	The Addiction (Christopher Daniels and Frankie Kazarian)	July 22, 2016	San Diego Comic-Con	San Diego, CA	1	<1	Daniels and Kazarian pinned "Spider-Man" at the same time to become co-champions; First tag team to become co-champions.	
1109	Mike Kingston	July 22, 2016	San Diego Comic-Con	San Diego, CA	1	<1	Creator of Headlocked (comics).	
1110	Joey Ryan	July 22, 2016	San Diego Comic-Con	San Diego, CA	9	<1		
1111	Laura James	July 22, 2016	San Diego Comic-Con	San Diego, CA	3	1		
1112	Ron Funches	July 23, 2016	San Diego Comic-Con	San Diego, CA	1	<1		
1113	Joey Ryan	July 23, 2016	San Diego Comic-Con	San Diego, CA	10	5		
1114	Candice LeRae	July 28, 2016	Vignette filmed in Ryan's home and Los Angeles studio	Los Angeles, CA	1	3	Pinned Joey Ryan in a "dream" (Stop motion match filmed with two dolls representing LeRae and Ryan, along with a referee action figure, by Andy Holton); at the end LeRae takes the belt from Ryan while he was sleeping); first title change to take place outside of reality.	
1115	Joey Ryan	July 31, 2016	Americana '16	Providence, RI	11	<1	Title change took place before the start of a six-woman tag team match LeRae participated at the event.	
1116	Mia Yim	July 31, 2016	Americana '16	Providence, RI	1	<1		
1117	Suge D	July 31, 2016	Americana '16	Providence, RI	1	<1	Georgia-based independent wrestler.	
1118	Tanya Cornell	July 31, 2016	Americana '16	Providence, RI	1	<1	Photographer for Beyond Wrestling.	
1119	Kevin Quinn	July 31, 2016	Americana '16	Providence, RI	1	<1	Referee.	
1120	Johnny Cockstrong	July 31, 2016	House show	Providence, RI	1	<1	New York-based independent wrestler.	
1121	Joey Ryan	July 31, 2016	House show	Providence, RI	12	<1		
1122	Beyond Wrestling audience	July 31, 2016	House show	Providence, RI	1	<1	Ryan forfeited the title to the audience of show by thanking them for his victory and saying that it was just as much theirs as it was his, which the referee interpreted as a forfeit, thus recognizing the audience as champion. The reign is only credited to "Beyond Wrestling audience", and not to the respective names of the people in attendance.	
1123	Joey Ryan	July 31, 2016	House show	Providence, RI	13	1	Audience members start clapping and slapping their hands against the ring as they chant over their victory, which Ryan immediately tells the referee that they're tapping out. Ryan is then awarded the title again.	
1124	Cereal Man	August 1, 2016	House show	Los Angeles, CA	1	3	California-based independent wrestler (primarily for Hoodslam).	
1125	Joey Ryan	August 4, 2016	House show	Los Angeles, CA	14	2		
1126	Suge D	August 6, 2016	House show	LaSalle, IL	2	<1		
1127	Santino Marella	August 6, 2016	House show	LaSalle, IL	1	<1		
1128	Joey Ryan	August 6, 2016	House show	LaSalle, IL	15	1		
1129	Johnny Gargano	August 7, 2016	House show	Miami, FL	1	1		
1130	Zack Sabre Jr.	August 8, 2016	House show	United States	1	1		
1131	Excalibur	August 9, 2016	House show	United States	1	1		
1132	Rick Knox	August 10, 2016	House show	United States	1	<1	Technical submission win by referee when he raised Excalibur's arm three times and he did not respond. Knox is a referee.	
1133	The Young Bucks (Matt Jackson and Nick Jackson)	August 10, 2016	House show	United States	1	1	The team hit referee Rick Knox with a Superkick together to win the title. Matt counted pin with Knox's hand to declare the win.	
1134	Chris Hero	August 11, 2016	House show	United States	1	<1	Bought the title from The Young Bucks with their own money.	
1135	Veda Scott	August 11, 2016	House show	United States	1	<1	Won the title by trading it with Hero for a new elbow technique.	
1136	Joey Ryan	August 11, 2016	House show	United States	16	1		
1137	Chris Masters	August 12, 2016	House show	United States	1	<1		
1138	Tommy Dreamer	August 12, 2016	House show	United States	1	<1	This was a First Blood match.	
1139	Joey Ryan	August 12, 2016	House show	United States	17	3		
1140	Rocky Romero	August 15, 2016	House show	United States	1	<1		
1141	Peter Avalon	August 15, 2016	House show	United States	1	<1		
1142	Marty Scurll	August 15, 2016	House show	United States	1	<1		
1143	Joey Ryan	August 15, 2016	House show	United States	18	<1		
1144	Rocky Romero	August 15, 2016	House show	United States	2	1		
1145	Jarek 1:20	August 16, 2016	House show	United States	1	1	Michigan-based independent wrestler. Won by forfeit after making Romero disappear in a magic trick.	
1146	Joey Ryan	August 17, 2016	House show	United States	19	1		
1147	Vince McMahon's star	August 18, 2016	House show	Hollywood, CA	1	<1	Vince McMahon's star on the Hollywood Walk of Fame.	
1148	Laura James	August 18, 2016	House show	Hollywood, CA	4	<1		
1149	Judas Draven	August 18, 2016	House show	United States	1	<1		
1150	Joey Ryan	August 18, 2016	House show	United States	20	1		
1151	X-Pac	August 19, 2016	House show	San Francisco, CA	1	<1		
1152	MVP	August 19, 2016	House show	San Francisco, CA	1	<1		
1153	Joey Ryan	August 19, 2016	House show	San Francisco, CA	21	1		
1154	Bill Hanstock	August 20, 2016	House show	North Hollywood, CA	1	<1	Wrestling journalist.	
1155	Brandon Stroud	August 20, 2016	House show	North Hollywood, CA	1	<1	Wrestling journalist.	
1156	Joey Ryan	August 20, 2016	House show	North Hollywood, CA	22	6		
1157	Guanchulo	August 26, 2016	House show	Tokyo, Japan	2	<1		
1158	Toru Owashi	August 26, 2016	House show	Tokyo, Japan	7	1		
1159	Kazuki Hirata	August 27, 2016	House show	Tokyo, Japan	8	<1		
1160	Rei Takagi	August 27, 2016	House show	Tokyo, Japan	2	<1	Sanshiro Takagi's daughter.	
1161	Joey Ryan	August 27, 2016	House show	Tokyo, Japan	23	<1		
1162	Toru Owashi	August 27, 2016	House show	Tokyo, Japan	8	1		
1163	Yakitori (II)	August 28, 2016	Ryōgoku Peter Pan 2016	Tokyo, Japan	1	<1		
1164	Cherry	August 28, 2016	Ryōgoku Peter Pan 2016	Tokyo, Japan	21	<1	Took place during a Rumble rules match.	
1165	Keisuke Ishii	August 28, 2016	Ryōgoku Peter Pan 2016	Tokyo, Japan	6	<1	Took place during a Rumble rules match.	
1166	Yoshihiko	August 28, 2016	Ryōgoku Peter Pan 2016	Tokyo, Japan	10	<1	Took place during a Rumble rules match.	
1167	Toru Owashi	August 28, 2016	Ryōgoku Peter Pan 2016	Tokyo, Japan	9	<1	Took place during a Rumble rules match.	
1168	Joey Ryan	August 28, 2016	Ryōgoku Peter Pan 2016	Tokyo, Japan	24	<1		
1169	Yakitori (III)	August 28, 2016	Ryōgoku Peter Pan 2016	Tokyo, Japan	1	<1		
1170	Ryota Yamasato	August 28, 2016	Ryōgoku Peter Pan 2016	Tokyo, Japan	1	86	Comedian. Member of comedy duo Nankai Candies.	
1171	Ano	November 22, 2016	House show	Tokyo, Japan	1	<1	Singer/songwriter.	
1172	Risa Azuma	November 22, 2016	House show	Tokyo, Japan	1	<1	Member of the idol duo Nama Hamu to Yaki Udon.	
1173	Ryota Sakai	November 22, 2016	House show	Tokyo, Japan	1	1	Member of comedy duo Onigoe Tomahawk.	
1174	Kazuki Hirata	November 23, 2016	House show	Tokyo, Japan	9	<1		
1175	TV Tokyo camera crane	November 23, 2016	House show	Tokyo, Japan	1	<1		
1176	Ryota Yamasato	November 23, 2016	House show	Tokyo, Japan	2	<1		
1177	Hiroshige	November 23, 2016	House show	Tokyo, Japan	1	<1	Director at TBS Radio.	
1178	Tokura Sepa	November 23, 2016	House show	Tokyo, Japan	1	<1	Columnist.	
1179	RN: Konyamoanokodenuitarou	November 23, 2016	House show	Tokyo, Japan	1	<1	An e-mail.	
1180	Kazuki Hirata	November 23, 2016	House show	Tokyo, Japan	10	<1		
1181	Gota Ihashi	November 23, 2016	House show	Japan	6	<1		
1182	Toru Owashi	November 23, 2016	House show	Kawaguchi, Japan	10	<1		
1183	Kazuki Hirata	November 23, 2016	House show	Kawaguchi, Japan	11	<1		
1184	Nobuhiro Shimatani	November 23, 2016	House show	Kawaguchi, Japan	1	<1		
1185	Gota Ihashi	November 23, 2016	House show	Kawaguchi, Japan	7	<1		
1186	Masahiro Takanashi	November 23, 2016	House show	Kawaguchi, Japan	16	<1		
1187	Kazuki Hirata	November 23, 2016	House show	Kawaguchi, Japan	12	<1		
1188	Toru Owashi	November 23, 2016	House show	Kawaguchi, Japan	11	7		
1189	Masahiro Takanashi	November 30, 2016	House show	Tokyo, Japan	17	<1		
1190	Soto Utashiro	November 30, 2016	House show	Tokyo, Japan	1	<1	DDT Pro-Wrestling employee.	
1191	Mataro	November 30, 2016	House show	Tokyo, Japan	1	2	Director and cameraman for Fighting TV Samurai.	
1192	Miki Motoi	December 2, 2016	House show	Tokyo, Japan	1	<1	Weather forecaster & wrestling commentator.	
1193	Toru Owashi	December 2, 2016	House show	Tokyo, Japan	12	2		
1194	Masahiro Takanashi	December 4, 2016	House show	Tokyo, Japan	18	<1		
1195	Guanchulo	December 4, 2016	House show	Shizuoka, Japan	3	<1		
1196	Bus	December 4, 2016	House show	Shizuoka, Japan	1	<1		
1197	Nobuhiro Shimatani	December 4, 2016	House show	Shiga, Japan	2	<1		
1198	Akira Aoki	December 4, 2016	House show	Shiga, Japan	1	<1	The bus' driver.	
1199	Toru Owashi	December 4, 2016	House show	Osaka, Japan	13	<1		
1200	Pork bun	December 4, 2016	House show	Osaka, Japan	1	<1		
1201	Mad Paulie	December 4, 2016	House show	Osaka, Japan	1	<1	Paulie ate the champion	
1202	Dai Suzuki	December 4, 2016	House show	Osaka, Japan	1	<1		
1203	Toru Owashi	December 4, 2016	House show	Osaka, Japan	14	<1		
1204	Kuishinbo Kamen	December 4, 2016	House show	Osaka, Japan	2	<1		
1205	Kikutaro	December 4, 2016	House show	Osaka, Japan	8	<1		
1206	Kotatsu	December 4, 2016	House show	Osaka, Japan	1	<1		
1207	Hyota Echizenya	December 4, 2016	House show	Osaka, Japan	1	62	Comedian.	
1208	Kotatsu	February 4, 2017	House show	Osaka, Japan	2	44		
1209	Guanchulo	March 20, 2017	Judgement 2017: DDT 20th Anniversary	Saitama, Japan	4	<1		
1210	Yoshihiko	March 20, 2017	Judgement 2017: DDT 20th Anniversary	Saitama, Japan	11	<1		
1211	Kotatsu	March 20, 2017	Judgement 2017: DDT 20th Anniversary	Saitama, Japan	3	<1	A kotatsu table.	
1212	Joey Ryan	March 20, 2017	Judgement 2017: DDT 20th Anniversary	Saitama, Japan	25	<1		
1213	Danshoku Dino	March 20, 2017	Judgement 2017: DDT 20th Anniversary	Saitama, Japan	21	6		
1214	Joey Ryan	March 26, 2017	House show	Osaka, Japan	26	<1		
1215	Danshoku Dino	March 26, 2017	House show	Osaka, Japan	22	<1		
1216	Joey Ryan	March 26, 2017	House show	Osaka, Japan	27	4		
1217	Brandi Rhodes	March 30, 2017	House show	Orlando, FL	1	<1		
1218	Pat Buck	March 30, 2017	House show	Orlando, FL	1	<1		
1219	Joey Ryan	March 30, 2017	House show	Orlando, FL	28	1		
1220	Matt Striker	March 31, 2017	House show	Orlando, FL	2	<1		
1221	Joey Ryan	March 31, 2017	House show	Orlando, FL	29	<1		
1222	Swoggle	March 31, 2017	House show	Orlando, FL	1	<1		
1223	Joey Ryan	March 31, 2017	House show	Orlando, FL	30	<1		
1224	The Sandman	March 31, 2017	House show	Orlando, FL	1	<1		
1225	Swoggle	March 31, 2017	House show	Orlando, FL	2	<1		
1226	Joey Ryan	March 31, 2017	House show	Orlando, FL	31	1		
1227	Jack the Jobber	April 1, 2017	WCPW's State of Emergency	Orlando, FL	1	<1	WhatCulture Pro Wrestling personality.	
1228	Joey Ryan	April 1, 2017	WCPW's State of Emergency	Orlando, FL	32	<1		
1229	Joe Hendry	April 1, 2017	WCPW's State of Emergency	Orlando, FL	1	<1		
1230	Trash bin	April 1, 2017	WCPW's State of Emergency	Orlando, FL	1	<1	Hendry threw the belt in the bin, thereby forfeiting to it and handing it the title.	
1231	Jack the Jobber	April 1, 2017	WCPW's State of Emergency	Orlando, FL	2	<1	Pinned the bin backstage.	
1232	Joey Ryan	April 1, 2017	WCPW State of Emergency	Orlando, FL	33	<1		
1233	Shayna Baszler	April 1, 2017	WrestleCon Women's Supershow	Orlando, FL	1	<1		
1234	Eddie Kingston	April 1, 2017	House show	Orlando, FL	1	<1		
1235	Joey Ryan	April 1, 2017	House show	Orlando, FL	34	<1		
1236	Joey Janela	April 1, 2017	House show	Orlando, FL	1	<1		
1237	The Invisible Man	April 1, 2017	House show	Orlando, FL	1	6		
1238	Jon Murray	April 7, 2017	Rockstar Pro Wrestling's Spring Break	Dayton, OH	1	<1	Ohio-based independent wrestler.	
1239	Joey Ryan	April 7, 2017	Rockstar Pro Wrestling's Spring Break	Dayton, OH	35	21		
1240	Tommy Dreamer	April 28, 2017	Fight! Nation UK Live event	Canterbury, United Kingdom	2	<1		
1241	Robert Sharpe	April 28, 2017	Fight! Nation UK Live event	Canterbury, United Kingdom	1	<1	UK-based independent wrestler.	
1242	Joey Ryan	April 28, 2017	Fight! Nation UK Live event	Canterbury, United Kingdom	36	1		
1243	Nixon Newell	April 29, 2017	Pro Wrestling Chaos Live event	Bristol, United Kingdom	1	1		
1244	Joey Ryan	April 30, 2017	House show	London, United Kingdom	37	<1		
1245	Nixon Newell	April 30, 2017	IPW:UK event	London, United Kingdom	2	<1		
1246	Joey Ryan	April 30, 2017	IPW: UK Meet & Greet	London, United Kingdom	38	<1		
1247	Giovanni Lombardo Jr.	April 30, 2017	House show	London, United Kingdom	1	<1	UK-based independent wrestler, AKA "Slick Lombardo".	
1248	Cuban Heat	April 30, 2017	House show	London, United Kingdom	1	<1	UK-based independent wrestler.	
1249	Joey Ryan	April 30, 2017	House show	London, United Kingdom	39	7		
1250	Sosa with the Cosa	May 7, 2017	House show	Ridgefield Park, NJ	1	<1	Fan.	
1251	Mikey Mickendrow	May 7, 2017	House show	Ridgefield Park, NJ	1	<1	Fan. Billed as Mike from the Front Row.	
1252	Joey Ryan	May 7, 2017	House show	Ridgefield Park, NJ	40	<1		
1253	Maxwell Jacob Friedman	May 7, 2017	House show	Ridgefield Park, NJ	1	<1		
1254	Lio Rush	May 7, 2017	House show	Ridgefield Park, NJ	1	<1		
1255	CPA	May 7, 2017	House show	Ridgefield Park, NJ	1	<1	New York-based independent wrestler.	
1256	Pinkie Sanchez	May 7, 2017	House show	Ridgefield Park, NJ	1	<1	New York-based independent wrestler.	
1257	Steven Pena	May 7, 2017	House show	Ridgefield Park, NJ	1	<1	New York-based independent wrestler.	
1258	Matt Caraballo	May 7, 2017	House show	Ridgefield Park, NJ	1	<1	New York-based independent wrestler.	
1259	Jimmy Lloyd	May 7, 2017	House show	Ridgefield Park, NJ	1	<1		
1260	Joey Ryan	May 7, 2017	House show	Ridgefield Park, NJ	41	18		
1261	Laura James	June 24, 2017	WrestleCircus' Dive Hard With a Vengeance	Austin, TX	5	10		
1262	Joey Ryan	July 4, 2017	Bar Wrestling 2: Independents Day	Baldwin Park, CA	42	3		
1263	Daisuke Sasaki	July 7, 2017	House show	Tokyo, Japan	5	<1		
1264	Joey Ryan	July 7, 2017	House show	Tokyo, Japan	43	8		
1265	Maho Kurone	July 15, 2017	House show	Yokohama, Japan	1	11		
1266	Miyu Yamashita	July 26, 2017	House show	Tokyo, Japan	1	4		
1267	Marika Kobashi	July 30, 2017	House show	Tokyo, Japan	1	<1		
1268	Cherry	July 30, 2017	House show	Tokyo, Japan	22	6		
1269	Tetsuya Koda	August 5, 2017	House show	Tokyo, Japan	2	15		
1270	Nodoka-Oneesan	August 20, 2017	Ryōgoku Peter Pan 2017	Tokyo, Japan	1	<1		
1271	Mizuki	August 20, 2017	Ryōgoku Peter Pan 2017	Tokyo, Japan	1	<1		
1272	Yuu	August 20, 2017	Ryōgoku Peter Pan 2017	Tokyo, Japan	1	35		
1273	Disposable Chopsticks	September 24, 2017	DDT Who's Gonna Top?	Tokyo, Japan	1	<1		
1274	Royce Isaacs	September 24, 2017	DDT Who's Gonna Top?	Tokyo, Japan	1	<1		
1275	Antonio Honda	September 24, 2017	DDT Who's Gonna Top?	Tokyo, Japan	10	<1		
1276	Yoshihiko	September 24, 2017	DDT Who's Gonna Top?	Tokyo, Japan	12	<1		
1277	Kazuki Hirata	September 24, 2017	DDT Who's Gonna Top?	Tokyo, Japan	13	<1		
1278	Yuni	September 24, 2017	DDT Who's Gonna Top?	Tokyo, Japan	1	<1		
1279	Makoto Oishi	September 24, 2017	DDT Who's Gonna Top?	Tokyo, Japan	8	<1		
1280	Yuu	September 24, 2017	DDT Who's Gonna Top?	Tokyo, Japan	2	60		
1281	Miyu Yamashita	November 23, 2017	House show	Tokyo, Japan	2	31		
1282	Ichiko Hirata	December 24, 2017	Never Mind 2017	Tokyo, Japan	14	<1	Previously known as Kazuki Hirata.	
1283	Diego	December 24, 2017	Never Mind 2017	Tokyo, Japan	5	6	Previously known as Guanchulo.	
1284	Dick Togo	December 30, 2017	House show	Tokyo, Japan	4	<1		
1285	Colt Cabana	December 30, 2017	House show	Tokyo, Japan	2	4		
1286	Super Sasadango Machine	January 3, 2018	House show	Tokyo, Japan	6	38	Was previously known as Muscle Sakai or Yoshihiro Sakai.	
1287	Abe Wakichi	February 10, 2018	House show	Tokyo, Japan	1	1	Food company employee.	
1288	Super Sasadango Machine	February 11, 2018	House show	Tokyo, Japan	7	12		
1289	Kaede	February 23, 2018	House show	Tokyo, Japan	1	1	Member of the idol group Negicco.	
1290	Super Sasadango Machine	March 2, 2018	House show	Tokyo, Japan	8	8		
1291	Mao	March 10, 2018	House show	Tokyo, Japan	1	<1		
1292	Sanshiro Takagi	March 10, 2018	House show	Tokyo, Japan	10	<1		
1293	Soma Takao	March 10, 2018	House show	Tokyo, Japan	3	1		
1294	Kazuki Hirata	March 11, 2018	House show	Tokyo, Japan	15	<1		
1295	Yuni	March 11, 2018	House show	Tokyo, Japan	2	<1		
1296	Makoto Oishi	March 11, 2018	House show	Tokyo, Japan	9	3		
1297	Aja Kong	March 14, 2018	House show	Tokyo, Japan	2	<1		
1298	Super Sasadango Machine	March 14, 2018	House show	Tokyo, Japan	9	39		
1299	Kazuki Hirata	April 22, 2018	House show	Nagano, Japan	16	<1		
1300	Super Sasadango Machine	April 22, 2018	House show	Nagano, Japan	10	7		
1301	Nobuhiro Shimatani	April 29, 2018	Max Bump 2018	Tokyo, Japan	3	<1		
1302	Saki Akai	April 29, 2018	Max Bump 2018	Tokyo, Japan	5	9		
1303	Masahiro Takanashi	May 8, 2018	House show	Tokyo, Japan	16	<1		
1304	Gorgeous Matsuno	May 8, 2018	House show	Tokyo, Japan	15	<1		
1305	Nobuhiro Shimatani	May 8, 2018	House show	Tokyo, Japan	4	<1		
1306	Saki Akai	May 8, 2018	House show	Tokyo, Japan	6	14		
1307	Nobuhiro Shimatani	May 22, 2018	House show	Tokyo, Japan	5	<1		
1308	Chair	May 22, 2018	House show	Tokyo, Japan	1	<1		
1309	Antonio Honda	May 22, 2018	House show	Tokyo, Japan	11	<1		
1310	Maki Itoh	May 22, 2018	House show	Tokyo, Japan	1	<1		
1311	Makoto Oishi	May 22, 2018	House show	Tokyo, Japan	10	5		
1312	Yuni	May 27, 2018	House show	Tokyo, Japan	3	<1		
1313	Saki Akai	May 27, 2018	House show	Tokyo, Japan	7	<1		
1314	Makoto Oishi	May 27, 2018	House show	Tokyo, Japan	11	2		
1315	Yoshihiko	May 29, 2018	House show	Tokyo, Japan	13	14		
1316	Makoto Oishi	June 12, 2018	House show	Tokyo, Japan	12	<1		
1317	Nobuhiro Shimatani	June 12, 2018	House show	Tokyo, Japan	6	4		
1318	Kenshin Chikano	June 16, 2018	Road To Ryogoku 2018: Dramatic Dream Tokasan	Hiroshima, Japan	1	<1		
1319	Tsuyoshi Okada	June 16, 2018	Road To Ryogoku 2018: Dramatic Dream Tokasan	Hiroshima, Japan	1	<1		
1320	Makoto Oishi	June 16, 2018	Road To Ryogoku 2018: Dramatic Dream Tokasan	Hiroshima, Japan	13	8		
1321	Kudo	June 24, 2018	What Are You Doing 2018	Tokyo, Japan	3	8	Teamed with Yukio Sakaguchi & Masahiro Takanashi to face Oishi & Danshoku Dino & Super Sasadango Machine and pins Oishi.	
1322	Nobuhiro Shimatani	July 10, 2018	DDT Live! Maji Manji #11	Tokyo, Japan	7	<1	Takes Place during an 8-Person Survival Battle Royal.	
1323	Saori Anou	July 10, 2018	DDT Live! Maji Manji #11	Tokyo, Japan	1	<1	Takes Place during an 8-Person Survival Battle Royal.	
1324	Saki Akai	July 10, 2018	DDT Live! Maji Manji #11	Tokyo, Japan	8	<1	Takes Place during an 8-Person Survival Battle Royal.	
1325	Nobuhiro Shimatani	July 10, 2018	DDT Live! Maji Manji #11	Tokyo, Japan	8	<1	Takes Place during an 8-Person Survival Battle Royal.	
1326	Konosuke Takeshita	July 10, 2018	DDT Live! Maji Manji #11	Tokyo, Japan	2	<1	Takes Place during an 8-Person Survival Battle Royal.	
1327	Akari Suda	July 10, 2018	DDT Live! Maji Manji #11	Tokyo, Japan	1	84	Member of the teen idol group SKE48.	
1328	Kaori Matsumura	October 2, 2018	House show	Tokyo, Japan	1	8	Member of the teen idol group SKE48.	
1329	Yuki Arai	October 10, 2018	House show	Tokyo, Japan	1	18	Member of the teen idol group SKE48.	
1330	Maki Itoh	October 28, 2018	DDT Live! Maji Manji #21 Korakuen Hall Special	Tokyo, Japan	2	7	This was a 7-person battle royal also involving Cherry, Emi Sakura, Mizuki, Saki Akai and Yuki Kamifuku.	
1331	Shoko Nakajima	November 4, 2018	TJPW 5th Anniversary Shin-Kiba Tour 2018 Autumn Two	Tokyo, Japan	1	<1		
1332	Maki Itoh	November 4, 2018	TJPW 5th Anniversary Shin-Kiba Tour 2018 Autumn Two	Tokyo, Japan	3	13	This was a No.1 Contendership Gauntlet Battle Royal disputed mainly for the Princess of Princess Championship but also for the Ironman title. The match also involved Hikari Noa, Miu Watanabe, Hyper Misao, Mizuki, Nodoka Tenma, Reika Saiki, Yuka Sakazaki, Yuki Aino, Yuki Kamifuku and Yuna Manase.	
1333	Miyu Yamashita	November 17, 2018	TJPW 5th Anniversary Shin-Kiba Tour 2018 Autumn Three	Tokyo, Japan	3	1	Teamed With Nodoka Tenma To Face Ito & Hyper Misao and Pins Ito.	
1334	Rika Tatsumi	November 18, 2018	TJPW Fan Club Show - Pure Tokyo Joshi Pro Wrestling 1	Warabi, Japan	1	6		
1335	Sayuri Namba	November 24, 2018	TJPW How Do You Like Narimasu?	Tokyo, Japan	1	<1	Ring Announcer For Tokyo Joshi Pro-Wrestling.	
1336	Tetsuya Koda	November 24, 2018	TJPW How Do You Like Narimasu?	Tokyo, Japan	3	1	General Manager Of Tokyo Joshi Pro Wrestling.	
1337	Konosuke Takeshita	November 25, 2018	DDT Special	Tokyo, Japan	3	5		
1338	Mike Bailey	November 30, 2018	D-Oh Grand Prix 2019	Tokyo, Japan	1	2		
1339	Tetsuya Endo	December 2, 2018	D-Oh Grand Prix 2019	Shizuoka, Japan	1	5		
1340	Soma Takao	December 7, 2018	D-Oh Grand Prix 2019	Tokyo, Japan	4	1		
1341	Shinya Aoki	December 8, 2018	D-Oh Grand Prix 2019	Osaka, Japan	1	1		
1342	Konosuke Takeshita	December 9, 2018	D-Oh Grand Prix 2019	Fukuoka, Japan	4	34		
1343	Chinsuke Nakamura	January 12, 2019	Chiba City Monorail Pro-Wrestling	Chiba, Japan	1	9	A parody of Shinsuke Nakamura.	
1344	Mr. Sato	January 21, 2019	House show	Tokyo, Japan	1	<1	Venue manager.	
1345	Chinsuke Nakamura	January 21, 2019	House show	Tokyo, Japan	2	6		
1346	Kikutaro	January 27, 2019	DDT Sweet Dreams 2018	Tokyo, Japan	9	<1	Took place during an 8-person battle royal.	
1347	Kazuki Hirata	January 27, 2019	DDT Sweet Dreams 2018	Tokyo, Japan	17	<1	Took place during an 8-person battle royal.	
1348	Asuka	January 27, 2019	DDT Sweet Dreams 2018	Tokyo, Japan	1	21	Took place during an 8-person battle royal. Not to be confused by five-time champion Kana, who later became more widely known as Asuka.	
1349	Kazuki Hirata	February 17, 2019	Judgement 2019: DDT 22nd Anniversary	Tokyo, Japan	18	<1	Took place during an 18-person battle royal.	
1350	Saki Akai	February 17, 2019	Judgement 2019: DDT 22nd Anniversary	Tokyo, Japan	9	46	Took place during an 18-person battle royal.	
1351	Makoto Oishi	April 4, 2019	DDT Is Coming to America	Woodside, NY	14	<1		
1352	Yoshihiko	April 4, 2019	DDT Is Coming to America	Woodside, NY	14	<1	Took place during an 8-person battle royal.	
1353	Kazuki Hirata	April 4, 2019	DDT Is Coming to America	Woodside, NY	19	<1	Took place during an 8-person battle royal.	
1354	Saki Akai	April 4, 2019	DDT Is Coming to America	Woodside, NY	10	<1		
1355	Makoto Oishi	April 4, 2019	DDT Is Coming to America	Woodside, NY	15	<1		
1356	Kazuki Hirata	April 4, 2019	DDT Is Coming to America	Woodside, NY	20	<1		
1357	Maki Itoh	April 4, 2019	DDT Is Coming to America	Woodside, NY	4	<1		
1358	Danshoku Dino	April 4, 2019	DDT Is Coming to America	Woodside, NY	23	1		
1359	Mao	April 5, 2019	WrestleCon Joey Ryan's Penis Party	New York, NY	2	<1	Took place during a 7-person battle royal.	
1360	Makoto Oishi	April 5, 2019	WrestleCon Joey Ryan's Penis Party	New York, NY	16	<1	Took place during a 7-person battle royal.	
1361	Yoshihiko	April 5, 2019	WrestleCon Joey Ryan's Penis Party	New York, NY	15	16	Took place during a 7-person battle royal.	
1362	Kazuki Hirata	April 21, 2019	DDT Shin Syu Very Much! 2019	Nagano, Japan	21	<1		
1363	Danshoku Dino	April 21, 2019	DDT Shin Syu Very Much! 2019	Nagano, Japan	24	42		
1364	Nobuhiro Shimatani	June 2, 2019	DDT Wrestle Matsuyamania 2019	Matsuyama, Japan	9	<1	Took place during a 9-person gauntlet battle royale.	
1365	Mad Paulie	June 2, 2019	DDT Wrestle Matsuyamania 2019	Matsuyama, Japan	2	<1	Took place during a 9-person gauntlet battle royale.	
1366	Asuka	June 2, 2019	DDT Wrestle Matsuyamania 2019	Matsuyama, Japan	2	<1	Took place during a 9-person gauntlet battle royale.	
1367	Makoto Oishi	June 2, 2019	DDT Wrestle Matsuyamania 2019	Matsuyama, Japan	17	<1	Took place during a 9-person gauntlet battle royale.	
1368	Tokihiro Nakamura	June 2, 2019	DDT Wrestle Matsuyamania 2019	Matsuyama, Japan	1	<1	Politician. Took place during a 9-person gauntlet battle royale.	
1369	Danshoku Dino	June 2, 2019	DDT Wrestle Matsuyamania 2019	Matsuyama, Japan	25	<1	Took place during a 9-person gauntlet battle royale.	
1370	Makoto Oishi	June 2, 2019	DDT Wrestle Matsuyamania 2019	Matsuyama, Japan	18	<1	Took place during a 9-person gauntlet battle royale.	
1371	Toru Owashi	June 2, 2019	DDT Wrestle Matsuyamania 2019	Matsuyama, Japan	15	10	Took place during a 9-person gauntlet battle royale.	
1372	Chair	June 12, 2019	DDT Suiyo Kasukabian! 2019	Kasukabe, Japan	3	<1		
1373	Daisuke Kiso	June 12, 2019	DDT Suiyo Kasukabian! 2019	Kasukabe, Japan	1	<1	Referee.	
1374	Toru Owashi	June 12, 2019	DDT Suiyo Kasukabian! 2019	Kasukabe, Japan	16	33		
1375	Lucky Ikeda	July 15, 2019	Wrestle Peter Pan 2019	Tokyo, Japan	1	<1	Celebrity and choreographer.	
1376	Gorgeous Matsuno	July 15, 2019	Wrestle Peter Pan 2019	Tokyo, Japan	16	<1	Took place during a 15-person Rumble rules match.	
1377	Tomomitsu Matsunaga	July 15, 2019	Wrestle Peter Pan 2019	Tokyo, Japan	9	<1	Took place during a 15-person Rumble rules match.	
1378	Mad Paulie	July 15, 2019	Wrestle Peter Pan 2019	Tokyo, Japan	3	<1	Took place during a 15-person Rumble rules match.	
1379	Kazuki Hirata	July 15, 2019	Wrestle Peter Pan 2019	Tokyo, Japan	22	<1	Took place during a 15-person Rumble rules match.	
1380	Yukio Sakaguchi	July 15, 2019	Wrestle Peter Pan 2019	Tokyo, Japan	2	17	Took place during a 15-person Rumble rules match.	
1381	Gabai Jichan	August 1, 2019	DDT Beer Garden Fight 2019 - Moonlight Express Day	Tokyo, Japan	1	<1		
1382	Yukio Sakaguchi	August 1, 2019	DDT Beer Garden Fight 2019 - Moonlight Express Day	Tokyo, Japan	3	<1		
1383	Makoto Oishi	August 2, 2019	DDT Rojo Pro Wrestling In Tokyo Idol Festival	Tokyo, Japan	19	<1	Took place during A 12 Man Falls count anywhere Battle royal.	
1384	Rise Shiokawa	August 2, 2019	DDT Rojo Pro Wrestling In Tokyo Idol Festival	Tokyo, Japan	1	<1	Member of the idol group Transfer Girls.	
1385	Danshoku Dino	August 2, 2019	DDT Rojo Pro Wrestling In Tokyo Idol Festival	Tokyo, Japan	26	<1	Took place during A 12 Man Falls count anywhere Battle royal.	
1386	Aika Sawaguchi	August 2, 2019	DDT Rojo Pro Wrestling In Tokyo Idol Festival	Tokyo, Japan	1	<1	Member of the idol group dela. Took place during A 12 Man Falls count anywhere Battle royal.	
1387	Maki Itoh	August 2, 2019	DDT Rojo Pro Wrestling In Tokyo Idol Festival	Tokyo, Japan	5	<1	Took place during A 12 Man Falls count anywhere Battle royal.	
1388	Misaki Natsumi	August 2, 2019	DDT Rojo Pro Wrestling In Tokyo Idol Festival	Tokyo, Japan	1	<1	Member of the idol group chuLa. Took place during A 12 Man Falls count anywhere Battle royal.	
1389	Danshoku Dino	August 2, 2019	DDT Rojo Pro Wrestling In Tokyo Idol Festival	Tokyo, Japan	27	<1	Took place during A 12 Man Falls count anywhere Battle royal.	
1390	Makoto Oishi	August 2, 2019	DDT Rojo Pro Wrestling In Tokyo Idol Festival	Tokyo, Japan	20	<1	Took place during A 12 Man Falls count anywhere Battle royal.	
1391	Momomi Wagatsuma	August 2, 2019	DDT Rojo Pro Wrestling In Tokyo Idol Festival	Tokyo, Japan	1	<1	Took place during A 12 Man Falls count anywhere Battle royal.	
1392	Maki Itoh	August 2, 2019	DDT Rojo Pro Wrestling In Tokyo Idol Festival	Tokyo, Japan	6	<1	Took place during A 12 Man Falls count anywhere Battle royal.	
1393	Yukio Sakaguchi	August 2, 2019	DDT Rojo Pro Wrestling In Tokyo Idol Festival	Tokyo, Japan	4	1	Took place during A 12 Man Falls count anywhere Battle royal.	
1394	Saki Akai	August 3, 2019	DDT Beer Garden Fight 2019 - DDT Day	Tokyo, Japan	11	<1		
1395	Kazuki Hirata	August 3, 2019	DDT Beer Garden Fight 2019 - DDT Day	Tokyo, Japan	23	<1		
1396	Yukio Sakaguchi	August 3, 2019	DDT Beer Garden Fight 2019 - DDT Day	Tokyo, Japan	5	<1		
1397	Beer Can	August 3, 2019	DDT Beer Garden Fight 2019 - DDT Day	Tokyo, Japan	1	<1		
1398	Yuki Ueno	August 3, 2019	DDT Beer Garden Fight 2019 - DDT Day	Tokyo, Japan	1	7	Drank the beer, declared new champion.	
1399	Yukio Sakaguchi	August 10, 2019	DDT Cry To The Fire! 2019	Hiroshima, Japan	6	2		
1400	Yuki Ueno	August 12, 2019	DDT Wrestling Tokotsu 2019	Fukuoka, Japan	2	<1		
1401	Toru Owashi	August 12, 2019	DDT Wrestling Tokotsu 2019	Fukuoka, Japan	17	<1		
1402	Yuki Ueno	August 12, 2019	DDT Wrestling Tokotsu 2019	Fukuoka, Japan	3	6		
1403	Masahiro Takanashi	August 18, 2019	DDT Dramatic E Ja Nai Ka 2019	Nagoya, Japan	18	<1		
1404	Makoto Oishi	August 18, 2019	DDT Dramatic E Ja Nai Ka 2019	Nagoya, Japan	21	<1		
1405	Yuki Ueno	August 18, 2019	DDT Dramatic E Ja Nai Ka 2019	Nagoya, Japan	4	<1		
1406	Makoto Oishi	August 18, 2019	DDT Dramatic E Ja Nai Ka 2019	Nagoya, Japan	22	<1		
1407	Yuki Ueno	August 18, 2019	DDT Dramatic E Ja Nai Ka 2019	Nagoya, Japan	5	7		
1408	Puma King	August 25, 2019	DDT Summer Vacation Memories 2019	Tokyo, Japan	1	6		
1409	Yuni	September 1, 2019	DDT Osaka Octopus 2019	Osaka, Japan	4	<1	Took place during a 7-man gauntlet battle royal also For The Octopus Cup.	
1410	Kazuki Hirata	September 1, 2019	DDT Osaka Octopus 2019	Osaka, Japan	24	<1	Took place during a 7-man gauntlet battle royal also For The Octopus Cup.	
1411	Saki Akai	September 1, 2019	DDT Osaka Octopus 2019	Osaka, Japan	12	<1	Took place during a 7-man gauntlet battle royal also For The Octopus Cup.	
1412	Asuka	September 1, 2019	DDT Osaka Octopus 2019	Osaka, Japan	3	<1	Took place during a 7-man gauntlet battle royal also For The Octopus Cup.	
1413	Kazuki Hirata	September 1, 2019	DDT Osaka Octopus 2019	Osaka, Japan	25	<1	Took place during a 7-man gauntlet battle royal also For The Octopus Cup.	
1414	Puma King	September 1, 2019	DDT Osaka Octopus 2019	Osaka, Japan	2	6	Took place during a 7-man gauntlet battle royal also For The Octopus Cup.	
1415	Akito	September 7, 2019	DDT Peanut, You Can Get Some Protein, Too! 2019	Chiba, Japan	3	<1		
1416	Puma King	September 7, 2019	DDT Peanut, You Can Get Some Protein, Too! 2019	Chiba, Japan	3	8		
1417	Daga	September 15, 2019	Lucha Invades NY	New York, NY	1	<1	Took place in a four-way no.1 contendership match for the AAA World Cruiserweight Championship.	
1418	Puma King	September 15, 2019	Lucha Invades NY	New York, NY	4	<1	Took place in a four-way no.1 contendership match for the AAA World Cruiserweight Championship.	
1419	Mascarita Dorada	September 15, 2019	Lucha Invades NY	New York, NY	1	<1	Took place in a four-way no.1 contendership match for the AAA World Cruiserweight Championship.	
1420	Puma King	September 15, 2019	Lucha Invades NY	New York, NY	5	5	Took place in a four-way no.1 contendership match for the AAA World Cruiserweight Championship.	
1421	Bandido	September 20, 2019	Battle of Los Angeles	Los Angeles, CA	1	<1		
1422	Puma King	September 20, 2019	Battle of Los Angeles	Los Angeles, CA	6	8		
1423	La Parka	September 28, 2019	AAA/Promociones EMW	Mexico City, Mexico	1	<1		
1424	Texano Jr.	September 28, 2019	AAA/Promociones EMW	Mexico City, Mexico	1	<1		
1425	La Hiedra	September 28, 2019	AAA/Promociones EMW	Mexico City, Mexico	1	1		
1426	Puma King	September 29, 2019	AAA/Promociones EMW	N/A	7	<1		
1427	Su Yung	September 29, 2019	Prestige Wrestling Roseland	Portland, OR	1	<1		
1428	Puma King	September 29, 2019	Prestige Wrestling Roseland	Portland, OR	8	<1		
1429	Kikutaro	September 29, 2019	Prestige Wrestling Roseland	Portland, OR	10	28		
1430	Tsubasa	October 27, 2019	OSW Hero Battle Show	Osaka, Japan	1	<1		
1431	Kikutaro	October 27, 2019	OSW Hero Battle Show	Osaka, Japan	11	2		
1432	Shota	October 29, 2019	House show	N/A	1	5		
1433	Chair	November 3, 2019	Ultimate Party 2019	Tokyo, Japan	1	<1	A folding chair.	
1434	Chair (II)	November 3, 2019	Ultimate Party 2019	Tokyo, Japan	1	<1	A different folding chair.	
1435	Yuki Kamifuku	November 3, 2019	Ultimate Party 2019	Tokyo, Japan	1	<1	Took place during a Rumble rules match.	
1436	Sagat	November 3, 2019	Ultimate Party 2019	Tokyo, Japan	1	<1	Took place during a Rumble rules match.	
1437	Gorgeous Matsuno	November 3, 2019	Ultimate Party 2019	Tokyo, Japan	17	<1	Took place during a Rumble rules match.	
1438	Kazuki Hirata	November 3, 2019	Ultimate Party 2019	Tokyo, Japan	26	<1	Took place during a Rumble rules match.	
1439	Danshoku Dino	November 8, 2019	DDT In This Case Shin-Kiba Is Just Right 2019	Tokyo, Japan	28	7		
1440	Kazuki Hirata	November 15, 2019	DDT Yokohama's Strongest! DDT Martial Arts Open Tournament 2019	Yokohama, Japan	27	<1		
1441	Toru Owashi	November 15, 2019	DDT Yokohama's Strongest! DDT Martial Arts Open Tournament 2019	Yokohama, Japan	18	2		
1442	Kazuki Hirata	November 17, 2019	DDT Ganpro Charisma Local Triumph! Nanto Ken Ohka 2019	Nanto, Japan	28	7		
1443	Michiaki Nakano	November 24, 2019	DDT God Bless DDT 2019	Tokyo, Japan	1	<1	Souken Holdings director.	
1444	Makoto Oishi	November 24, 2019	DDT God Bless DDT 2019	Tokyo, Japan	23	6		
1445	Antonio Honda	November 30, 2019	DDT D-Oh Grand Prix 2020 In Yokohama 2 Days	Yokohama, Japan	12	<1		
1446	Makoto Oishi	November 30, 2019	DDT D-Oh Grand Prix 2020 In Yokohama 2 Days	Yokohama, Japan	24	10		
1447	Rey Paloma	December 10, 2019	DDT D-Oh Grand Prix 2020 In Hiroshima	Hiroshima, Japan	1	<1		
1448	Makoto Oishi	December 10, 2019	DDT D-Oh Grand Prix 2020 In Hiroshima	Hiroshima, Japan	25	5		
1449	Toru Owashi	December 15, 2019	DDT D-Oh Grand Prix 2020 In Harajuku 2 Days	Tokyo, Japan	19	<1	This was a nine-person 10 minute time-limit battle royal.	
1450	Saki Akai	December 15, 2019	DDT D-Oh Grand Prix 2020 In Harajuku 2 Days	Tokyo, Japan	13	<1	Took place during the same battle royale.	
1451	Tomomitsu Matsunaga	December 15, 2019	DDT D-Oh Grand Prix 2020 In Harajuku 2 Days	Tokyo, Japan	10	<1	Took place during the same battle royale.	
1452	Masahiro Takanashi	December 15, 2019	DDT D-Oh Grand Prix 2020 In Harajuku 2 Days	Tokyo, Japan	19	<1	Took place during the same battle royale.	
1453	D-Oh Grand Prix trophy	December 15, 2019	DDT D-Oh Grand Prix 2020 In Harajuku 2 Days	Tokyo, Japan	1	<1	Took place during the same battle royale.	
1454	Hisaya Imabayashi	December 15, 2019	DDT D-Oh Grand Prix 2020 In Harajuku 2 Days	Tokyo, Japan	1	<1	General Manager of DDT. Took place during the same battle royale.	
1455	Saki Akai	December 15, 2019	DDT D-Oh Grand Prix 2020 In Harajuku 2 Days	Tokyo, Japan	14	<1	Took place during the same battle royale.	
1456	Kazuki Hirata	December 15, 2019	DDT D-Oh Grand Prix 2020 In Harajuku 2 Days	Tokyo, Japan	29	<1	Took place during the same battle royale.	
1457	Toru Owashi	December 15, 2019	DDT D-Oh Grand Prix 2020 In Harajuku 2 Days	Tokyo, Japan	20	19	Took place during the same battle royale.	

== See also ==
- WWE Hardcore Championship – a title with a similar 24/7 rule
- WWE 24/7 Championship – another title with a similar 24/7 rule
