= Laura James (wrestler) =

English professional wrestler

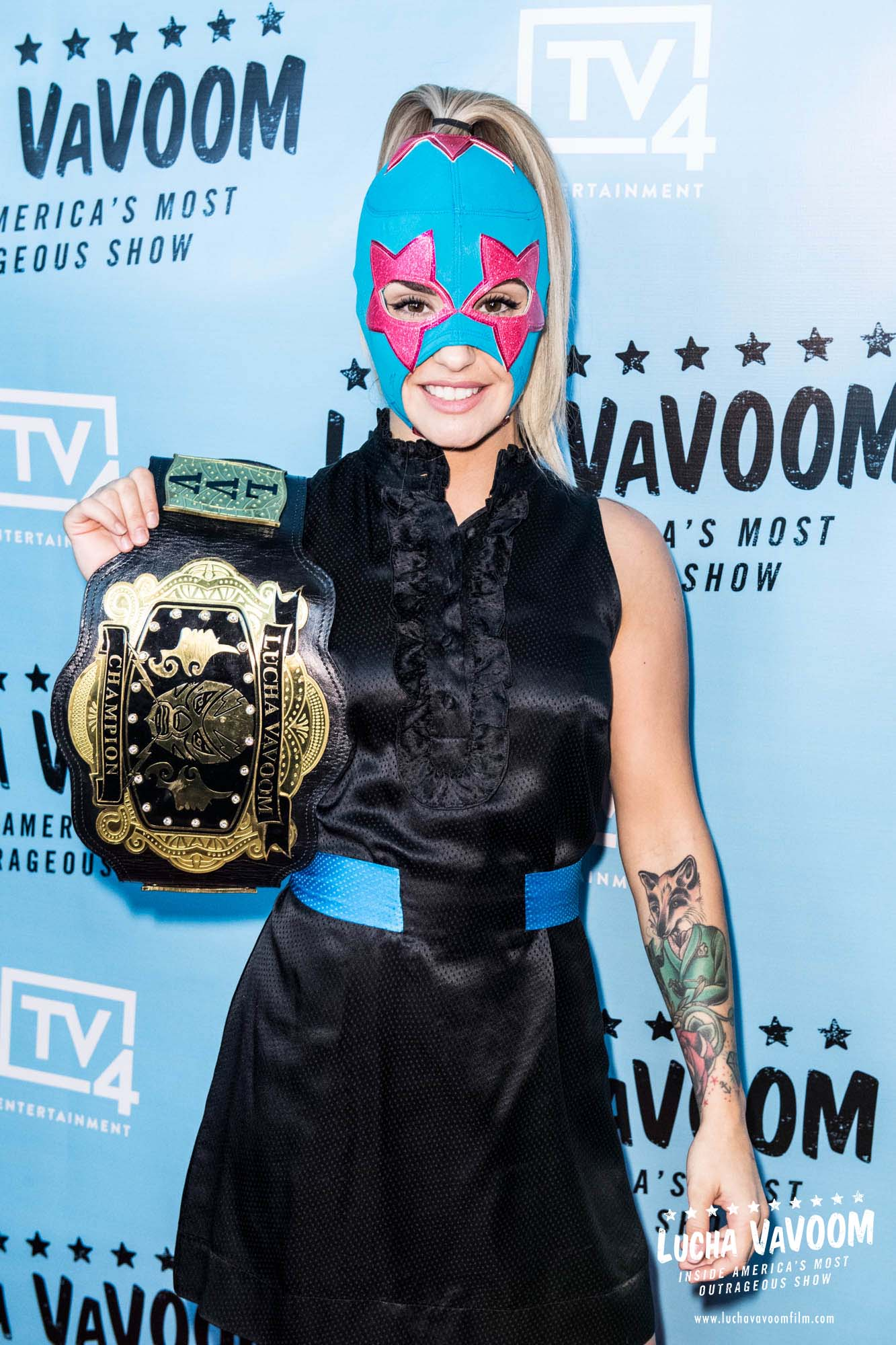
- James in 2017

Personal information
- Born: Laura Clare James; 25 January 1987 (age 39) Plymouth, England
- Spouse: Joey Ryan (m. 2016; div. 2019)

Professional wrestling career
- Ring name(s): Alacrana Plata; Laura James; Dama Fina
- Billed height: 5 ft 4 in (1.63 m)
- Billed weight: 126 lb (57 kg)
- Trained by: Gangrel
- Debut: June 2012

Laura Clare James (born 25 January 1987) is an English professional wrestler. She was trained by Gangrel and is currently working on the independent wrestling scenes, most notably for Lucha VaVOOM and Global Force Wrestling. She can also be seen in the Peaches music video for "Close Up", and wrestled on the Puscifer Money Shot Round #2 Tour under the ring names Alacrana Plata ("Silver Scorpion") and Dama Fina.

== Professional wrestling career ==
=== Independent circuit (2014–present) ===
James has worked for various independent wrestling promotions such as Lucha VaVOOM, Alternative Wrestling Show, Finest City Wrestling, Dreamwave Wrestling and more.

=== Global Force Wrestling (2015–2017) ===
James made her GFW debut at The Orleans Arena at Las Vegas, Nevada on 21 August 2015 on Amped where she was in a GFW Women's Championship tournament qualifying match that also included Katarina Waters which was ultimately won by Amber Gallows.

=== Luchafer (2016) ===
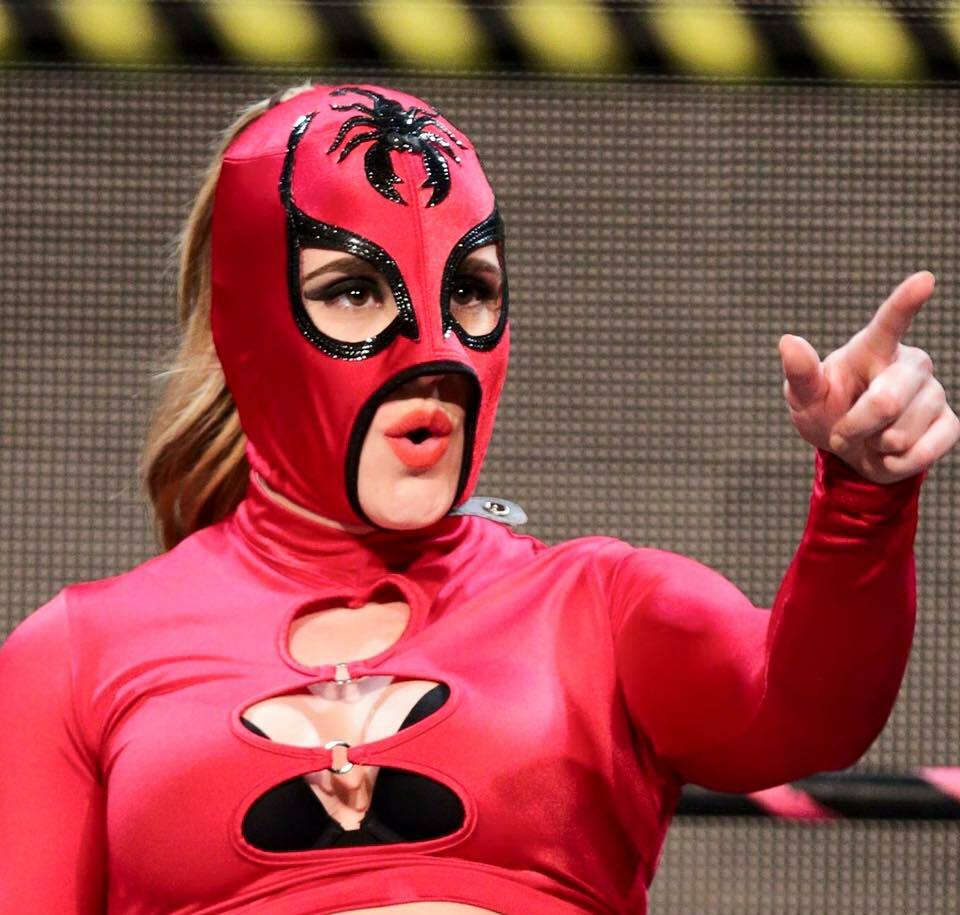
James as Alacrana Plata on The Puscifer Tour

James performed as Alacrana Plata with the wrestling group Luchafer as the opening act and wrestling throughout the show with the band Puscifer on their Money Shot Round 2 Tour of North America. She wrestled in 33 cities with the group over a period of six weeks.

=== Dramatic Dream Team (2016) ===
James won the Ironman Heavymetalweight Championship on 20 June 2016, in Los Angeles, by defeating Kikutaro. She lost it on the same day to a cat named Bunny. On 29 June, James (as Alacrana Plata #2) won the belt for a second time after pinning Joey Ryan in a strip club. On 22 July, James won the belt for a third time, again defeating Ryan, at a Finest City Wrestling event. On 18 August, she won the belt for the fourth time but lost it to Judas Draven on the same day.

== Personal life ==
In 2013, James competed in the National Physique Committee Amateur Figure Competition.

In 2015, James performed in the wrestling themed music video for song "Close Up" by Peaches. James acted as Peaches during the scenes that required wrestling from the musician.

In February 2016, James got engaged to her boyfriend, fellow wrestler Joseph Meehan, better known as Joey Ryan. Ryan proposed to her during their intergender match at Finest City Wrestling in San Diego. James said yes, and after he put the ring on her hand, Ryan rolled her up to win the match. The video clip of the proposal went viral and the couple made appearances on various news outlets including a feature on ESPN SportsCenter. The couple married in November 2016. In October 2018 the two separated, with James filing for divorce from Ryan in June 2019, citing "irreconcilable differences".

James is an atheist.

== Filmography ==
=== Television ===
Year	Title	Role	Notes
2017	GLOW	Crystal	1 Episode

== Championships and accomplishments ==
- Dramatic Dream Team
  - Ironman Heavymetalweight Championship (4 times)
