= Maki Itoh =

Japanese female professional wrestler

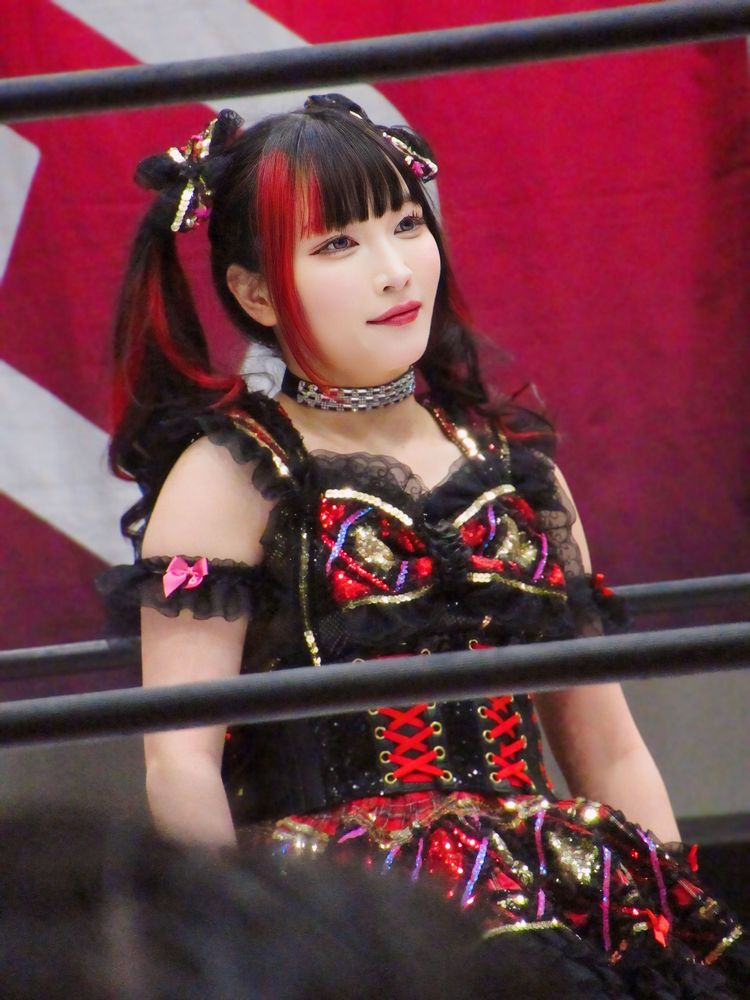
- Itoh in February 2024
- Born: July 22, 1995 (age 31); Ogōri, Fukuoka, Japan
- Musical career
- Genre: J-pop
- Instrument: Vocals
- Years active: 2012–present
- Member of: Tokiwoikiru
- Formerly of: LinQ
- Professional wrestling career
- Ring name(s): Maki Ito; Maki Itoh
- Billed height: 5 ft 3 in (160 cm)
- Debut: December 15, 2013

Maki Itoh (伊藤麻希, Itō Maki; born July 22, 1995) is a Japanese professional wrestler, actress, and singer. She is signed to World Wonder Ring Stardom. She is best known for her tenure with Tokyo Joshi Pro Wrestling, where she is a former 2-time International Princess Champion and former 2-time Princess Tag Team Champion, both times alongside Miyu Yamashita. She initially debuted as a member of the idol group LinQ, and she is, currently, a member of the idol group Tokiwoikiru (トキヲイキル). She also makes appearances for American based wrestling promotions All Elite Wrestling (AEW) and Game Changer Wrestling (GCW).

== Early life ==
Itoh was born in Ogōri, Fukuoka Prefecture on July 22, 1995. She lived a rural lifestyle during her childhood. She was often bullied at her junior high school. She could not attend high school because she failed the entrance exams.

She became interested in idol culture after learning that her crush liked AKB48 member Yuki Kashiwagi.

== Music career ==
Itoh made her debut in show business as part of the second generation of LinQ members, officially joining the group on February 11, 2012. She was placed in the group's Qty team.

As a LinQ member, her first experience with professional wrestling was in 2013, when she was invited by president Sanshiro Takagi to participate in an "Idol Lumberjack 4 Way Match" at a DDT Pro-Wrestling show in Ryogoku Kokugikan. In the same year, she played a supporting role in the two-part thriller film ADA.

In 2014 she was selected as a finalist in the Kodansha alternative beauty pageant, Miss iD, and although she was not selected for the main prize, she received a special prize given to her personally by television producer Nobuyuki Sakuma. Her participation in Miss iD led to her being featured on the song "Heisei Shibou Yuugi" by the band Urbangarde. In the same year, she also participated in the 6th anniversary show of Kyushu Pro-Wrestling, "Kinniku Yamakasa '14", where she was the official second for Gabai-jichan.

In 2015, Itoh played a role in the horror film Obakeyashiki Retsuden: Senritsu Meikyuu MAX alongside fellow LinQ members Yusa Sugimoto and Kana Fukuyama. She also played a main role in the short film Inochi no Tokei, written and soundtracked by LinQ member Manami Sakura and featuring a cast made exclusively of the group's members. She appeared on the variety show God Tongue in June, drawing attention from the show's hosts due to the size of her head.

In 2016, Itoh played herself in the film Minna Suitouto (みんな好いとうと), a fictional movie based on LinQ and featuring the group's songs. LinQ were signed to the major label Avex later that year. In August she appeared on Masahiro Nakai's talk show Nakai no Mado, in a special episode featuring "people with unfortunate faces".

In 2017, it was announced that the lineup of LinQ would be rearranged, and that a number of members would leave the group. Those members who were removed from LinQ would be featured in a new group focused on musical theater, but only if LinQ could sell 1,000 tickets to concerts held in Tokyo's Nakano Sun Plaza and the Fukuoka Civic Hall. Itoh personally performed wrestling and music on the streets in order to sell the tickets and promote the group, and they succeeded in meeting the requirements. However, on June 19, 2017, Itoh was removed from the group's lineup along with 6 other members, who were moved into the "entertainment group" Tokiwoikiru. Her response to being dismissed caused "Maki Itoh" to become the #1 Twitter trend in Japan at the time.

After her removal from LinQ, Itoh turned her wrestling tag team with regular partner Mizuki, Itoh Respect Army (伊藤リスペクト軍団, Itō Risupekuto Gundan), into an idol group. The pair released their first CD single, "Setsunairo", on January 4, 2018. Upon successfully selling 400 CDs, a music video was produced for the title track. The group appeared together on internet variety show The Night with host Mari Yaguchi, where they performed "Setsunairo" and demonstrated wrestling moves live in the studio.

Itoh performed her first show as a solo idol at Tokyo Idol Festival 2018: Other Recommend Live, a battle of the bands-style concert where idols nominated by judges compete for a spot at the prestigious Tokyo Idol Festival main event. Nominated by writer Go Yoshida, Itoh performed "Setsunairo" twice, along with an impromptu a cappella cover of "nerve" by BiS. Although she did not make it through as a musical performer, she later appeared as a part of the DDT Street Wrestling show held at the festival.

On July 22, 2019, Itoh released the digital single "Brooklyn The Hole", a solo recording of a song originally performed by Tokiwoikiru, which she currently uses as her wrestling entrance theme.

== Professional wrestling career ==
=== DDT Pro-Wrestling appearances (2013–2016) ===
From 2013 to 2016, Itoh made sporadic appearances at DDT Pro-Wrestling shows. On December 15, 2013, at the World Third Total Hakata event, she teamed with Danshoku Dino and Makoto Oishi in a two-on-three handicap match, where they defeated Sanshiro Takagi and Toru Owashi.

On December 13, 2015, at Super Star Lanes 2015, Itoh took part in a battle royal for the Ironman Heavymetalweight Championship, where she was the first eliminated.

=== Tokyo Joshi Pro Wrestling (2016–2025) ===
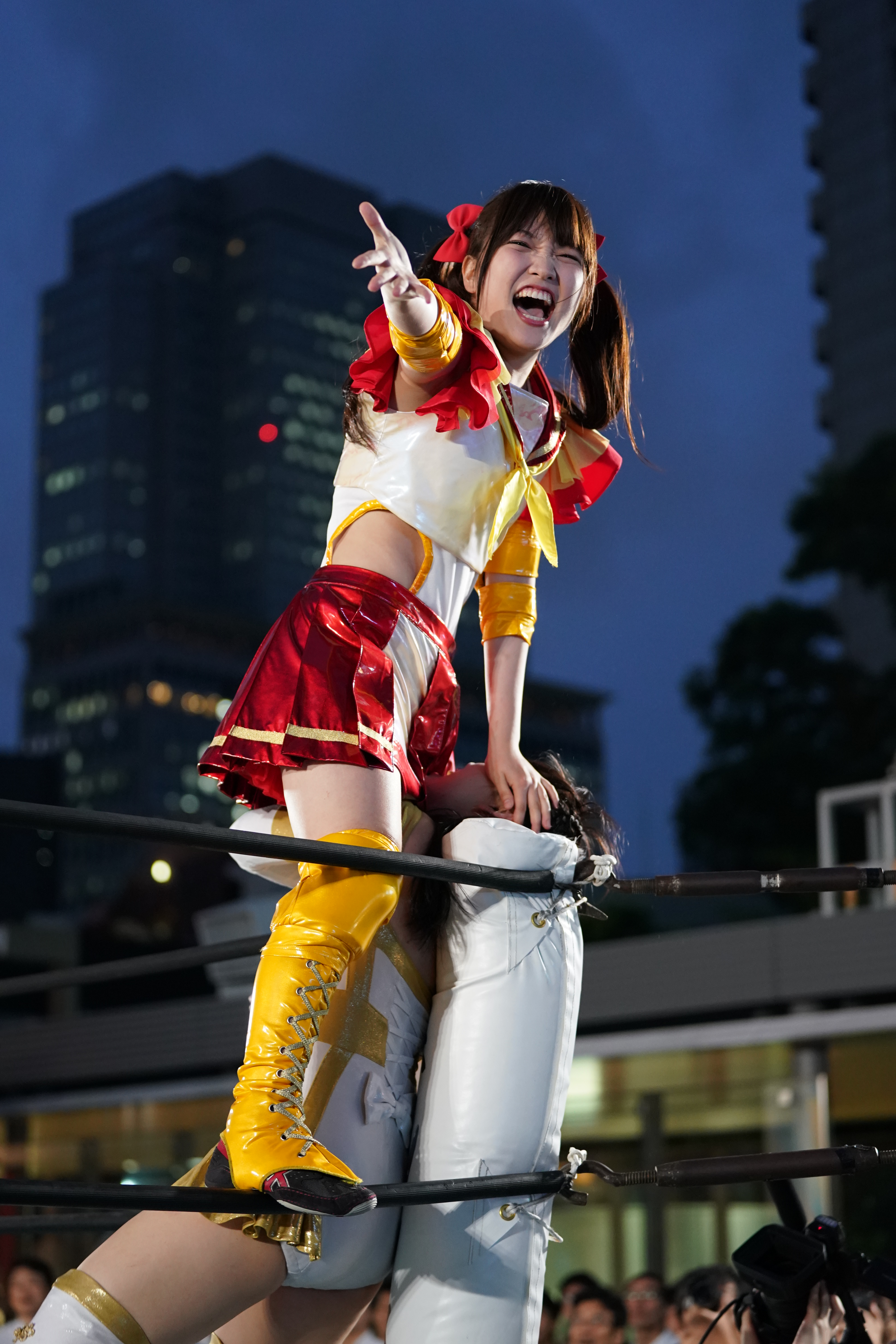
Itoh in 2017

On December 11, 2016, at the DDT Pro-Wrestling event Road to SUPER SAND-Dramatic Dream Tonkotsu- in Fukuoka Hakata Star Lane, Itoh made her official DDT debut, where she was defeated by Miyu Yamashita.

On January 4, 2017, Itoh officially joined Tokyo Joshi Pro Wrestling. On March 13, 2017, at At This Time, Get Excited In Nerima! Itoh was defeated by Mil Clown in a three-way match also featuring Maho Kurone.

After her dismissal from the idol group LinQ, Itoh stopped using the group's song "Calorie Nante" as her entrance theme, instead choosing to perform an on-the-spot a cappella version of the Noriyuki Makihara song "Mou Koi Nante Shinai". This continued until the beginning of October 2017, when she began entering to "Setsunairo" by Tokiwoikiru.

In July, Itoh participated in the Tokyo Princess Cup held at Shinjuku Mura Studio. In the first round, she fought against Shoko Nakajima, but was eliminated.

Itoh made her US debut at DDT Coming to America where she wrestled Miyu Yamashita. The next day she appeared at Joey Ryan's Penis Party event organized by Joey Ryan where she fought in a multi-man match for the Ironman Heavymetalweight Championship, but was defeated by the champion Yoshihiko.

On October 2, 2018, at YES! Wonderland 2018, Itoh would face future AEW Women's World Champion and wrestling prodigy Riho - losing by double knee strike.

On October 10, 2019, Itoh would win her first title winning the TJPW International Princess Championship at My life; let's enjoy!!, defeating Yuna Manase by reversing a pin into the Itoh Special (Texas Cloverleaf).

In 2019, Itoh's long-standing tag team with her partner Mizuki, Itoh Respect Army, was officially disbanded after a singles match between the two. Itoh later recruited British wrestler Chris Brookes to replace Mizuki, renaming the team to NEO Itoh Respect Army. After leaving his tour of Japan and returning to the United Kingdom, Brookes continued to represent the NEO Itoh Respect Army by wearing the team's official T-shirt and using Itoh's trademark kokeshi headbutt during shows. Itoh and Brookes had their first match as a tag team on November 3 at DDT's Ultimate Party 2019, where they also teamed up with Bakuretsu Sisters (Nodoka Tenma and Yuki Aino) and lost to Nautilus (Yuki Ueno and Naomi Yoshimura), Yukio Naya and Cody Hall, Yukio Sakaguchi and Ryota Nakatsu, Shuichiro Katsumura and Kouki Iwasaki in a Gauntlet tag team match.

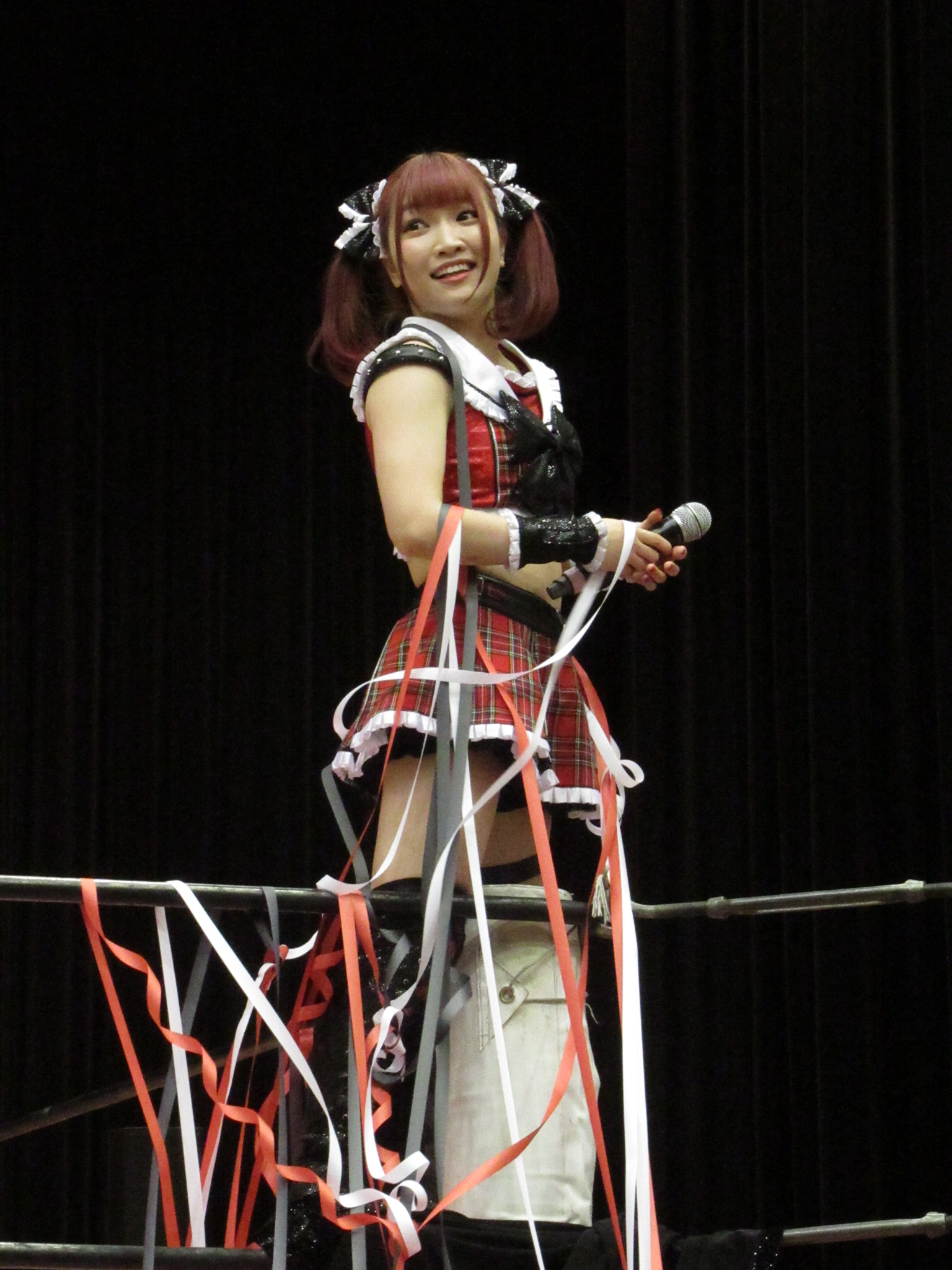
Itoh in 2020

On January 5, 2019, Itoh would lose the International Princess Championship to Thunder Rosa, who also defeated Mizuki the day before on TJPW's signature January 4 show.

On September 22, 2024, Itoh won the Princess Tag Team Championship with Miyu Yamashita at Wrestle Princess V by defeating Daisy Monkey (Arisu Endo and Suzume).

On August 26, 2025, Itoh announced that her contract with TJPW had ended.

=== All Elite Wrestling (2021–2022) ===
On the February 3, 2021, edition of AEW Dynamite, it was announced that Itoh would be participating in the AEW Women's World Title Eliminator tournament. She lost to Ryo Mizunami in the first round which aired on February 15. At Revolution, Itoh made a surprise appearance as Britt Baker's mystery partner, replacing Rebel. They were victorious over Thunder Rosa and Riho. Itoh appeared on the first episode of the web series AEW Dark: Elevation where she lost to Riho in the main event.

On the May 18, 2022, episode of Dynamite, she was revealed to be the "Joker" in the Owen Hart Cup, only to lose by submission to Britt Baker.

=== Freelancing (2025) ===
On October 19, 2025, Itoh made her first appearance since leaving TJPW for Kyushu Pro-Wrestling, teaming with Tajiri and Charles Crowley to defeat Jet Wei, One Kyushu and Princess Pistachio at the Ogōri Citizens Festival.

=== World Wonder Ring Stardom (2026–present) ===
After weeks of vignettes that teased an incoming talent, it was announced on January 10, 2026 that Itoh had signed with World Wonder Ring Stardom.

After entering World Wonder Ring Stardom, she won the Kawaii of Kawaii Championship, which she defended against Aya Sakura on July 2, 2026. After a long back-and-forth battle, Itoh forced Sakura to tap out with her trademark Itoh Special (Texas Cloverleaf) submission hold, and retained her championship belt.

== Other media ==
On September 8, 2022, Itoh announced the opening of her own OnlyFans page via a Twitter post. A picture posted on the same post teased that Itoh was posing either topless or fully nude, given the typical nature of most OnlyFans content providers. However, Itoh noted herself on her OnlyFans that she was only doing bikini and other non-nude shoots for the page.

Itoh's version of "Brooklyn The Hole" is featured in the video game AEW Fight Forever as a selectable track in the in-game jukebox.

== Championships and accomplishments ==
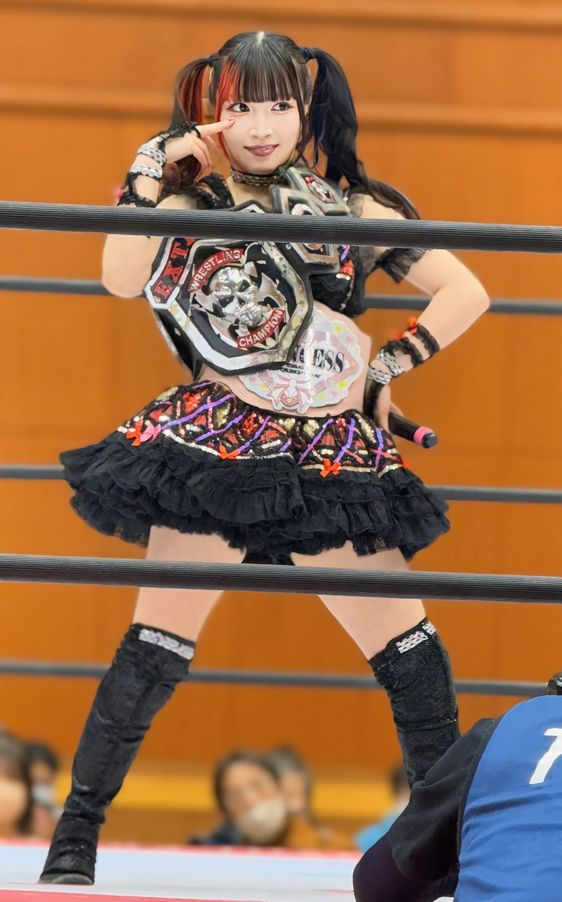
Itoh as the GCW Extreme Champion (black) and Princess Tag Team Champion (pink) in January 2025

- DDT Pro-Wrestling
  - Ironman Heavymetalweight Championship (6 times)
- Game Changer Wrestling
  - GCW Extreme Championship (1 time)
- Pro Wrestling Illustrated
  - Ranked No. 37 of the top 150 female wrestlers in the PWI Women's 150 in 2022
  - Ranked No. 456 of the top 500 singles wrestlers in the PWI 500 in 2024
- Tokyo Joshi Pro Wrestling
  - International Princess Championship (2 times)
  - Princess Tag Team Championship (2 times) – with Miyu Yamashita
  - Tokyo Princess Cup (2021)
  - "Futari wa Princess" Max Heart Tournament (2023) – with Miyu Yamashita

== Discography ==
- Setsunairo (セツナイロ), released January 4, 2018.
  1. Setsunairo _{[セツナイロ, credited as Ito Respect Gundan; 伊藤リスペクト軍団]}
  2. Muteki no Pathos (Maki Itoh ver.) _{[無敵のパトス（伊藤麻希ver.）]}
  3. Setsunairo (instrumental) _{[セツナイロ (instrumental)]}
- Brooklyn The Hole, released July 22, 2019.
  - 1. Brooklyn The Hole (Maki Itoh ver.)

== Filmography ==
- ADA: Senritsu-hen
- ADA: Zetsubou-hen
- Obakeyashiki Retsuden: Senritsu Meikyuu MAX
- Minna Suitouto
