= Ryōgoku Peter Pan 2013 =

2013 DDT Pro-Wrestling event

Ryōgoku Peter Pan 2013: Pro-Wrestling Trends and Countermeasures
- Promotional poster for the event featuring various wrestlers
- Promotion: DDT Pro-Wrestling
- Date: August 18, 2013
- City: Tokyo, Japan
- Venue: Ryōgoku Kokugikan
- Attendance: 9,000

Peter Pan chronology
← Previous; 2012	Next → 2014

Ryōgoku Peter Pan 2013: Pro-Wrestling Trends and Countermeasures (両国ピーターパン2013〜プロレスの傾向と対策〜, Ryōgoku Pītā Pan 2013: puroresu no keikō to taisaku) was a professional wrestling event promoted by DDT Pro-Wrestling (DDT). The event took place on August 18, 2013, in Tokyo at the Ryōgoku Kokugikan. The event featured ten matches, four of which were contested for championships. The event aired on Fighting TV Samurai.

== Storylines ==
The Ryōgoku Peter Pan 2013 event featured ten professional wrestling matches that involved different wrestlers from pre-existing scripted feuds and storylines. Wrestlers portrayed villains, heroes, or less distinguishable characters in the scripted events that built tension and culminated in a wrestling match or series of matches.

By winning the King of DDT tournament on July 7, Harashima earned a title match in the main event against KO-D Openweight Champion Shigehiro Irie.

== Event ==
The second dark match saw the team of Sanshiro Takagi, Toru Owashi and Akebono take on the team of Jun Kasai from Pro-Wrestling Freedoms, Antonio Honda and Hoshitango for a spot in the KO-D 6-Man Tag Team Championship match taking place later on the main card.

Similarly, the first match of the main card was a four-way tag team match to determine the next challengers to the KO-D Tag Team title who would go on to face the champions at the Who's Gonna Top? 2013 event on September 29. This match saw the participation of Yuji Hino from Kaientai Dojo who teamed up with Daisuke Sasaki.

The next match was the "Souken Group Presents Ironman Heavymetalweight Championship Battle Royale", a Rumble rules match for the Ironman Heavymetalweight Championship. Kōmyō, a painting by Akihiro Miwa, was the 972nd champion heading into the match. It was accompanied by Shuji Ishikawa and Seiya Morohashi who served as its bodyguards. During the match, DJ Nira pinned Kōmyō to eliminate it from the match and become the 973rd champion. Last entrant Akihiro, an inflatable love doll, then eliminated DJ Nira thus winning the match and becoming the 974th champion.

The next match saw the debut of Saki Akai teaming with Masa Takanashi and Cherry against the team of Yoshiko from World Wonder Ring Stardom, Hikaru Shida from Ice Ribbon and Hiroshi Fukuda.

The next match was a special singles match between Katsuhiko Nakajima from Diamond Ring and Konosuke Takeshita.

In the next match, Sanshiro Takagi, Toru Owashi and Akebono, having won first contendership earlier, challenged the team of Kensuke Sasaki, the founder and owner of Diamond Ring, Danshoku Dino and Makoto Oishi for their KO-D 6-Man Tag Team Championship title.

The next match was a KO-D Tag Team Championship match between challengers Yuko Miyamoto and Isami Kodaka together known as Yankī Nichōkenjū (ヤンキー二丁拳銃; "Yankee Pistols Akimbo"), and champions Hikaru Sato and Yukio Sakaguchi.

The first match of the double main event saw the then IWGP Heavyweight Champion Kazuchika Okada from New Japan Pro-Wrestling take on Kota Ibushi in a singles match.

== Results ==
No.	Results	Stipulations	Times
1^{D}	Akito and Guanchulo defeated Fuma and Daichi Kazato	Tag team match	6:03
2^{D}	Sanshiro Takagi, Toru Owashi and Akebono defeated Antonio Honda, Hoshitango and Jun Kasai	Falls Count Anywhere six-man tag team match Winners got a KO-D 6-Man Tag Team Championship match later on the evening.	19:42
3	Team Dream Futures (Keisuke Ishii and Soma Takao) defeated Yasu Urano and Kudo, Daisuke Sasaki and Yuji Hino, and Kenny Omega and Gota Ihashi	Four-way tag team match Winners got a KO-D Tag Team Championship match on September 29, at Who's Gonna Top? 2013.	13:31
4	Akihiro won by last eliminating DJ Nira	Rumble rules match for the Ironman Heavymetalweight Championship	11:52
5	Masa Takanashi, Cherry and Saki Akai defeated Hiroshi Fukuda, Yoshiko and Hikaru Shida	Six-person tag team match	11:53
6	Katsuhiko Nakajima defeated Konosuke Takeshita	Singles match	15:39
7	Sanshiro Takagi, Toru Owashi and Akebono defeated Danshoku Dino, Makoto Oishi and Kensuke Sasaki (c)	Six-man tag team match for the KO-D 6-Man Tag Team Championship	10:34
8	Yankī Nichōkenjū (Yuko Miyamoto and Isami Kodaka) defeated Hikaru Sato and Yukio Sakaguchi (c)	Tag team match for the KO-D Tag Team Championship	18:12
9	Kazuchika Okada defeated Kota Ibushi	Singles match	19:51
10	Harashima defeated Shigehiro Irie (c)	Singles match for the KO-D Openweight Championship	23:07
(c) / – the champion(s) heading into the match; D / – this was a dark match

=== Rumble rules match ===
Order	Name	Order eliminated	By	Time
1_{A} (Note: Kōmyō entered accompanied by its bodyguards Ishikawa and Morohashi.)	Kōmyō (c)	10	DJ Nira (Note: DJ Nira becomes the 973rd Ironman Heavymetalweight Champion.)	9:28
1_{B}	Shuji Ishikawa	9	Kazuki Hirata and DJ Nira	9:05
1_{C}	Seiya Morohashi	8	Tomomitsu Matsunaga	9:04
2	Gorgeous Matsuno	3	Yuto Aijima	4:31
3	Mikami	2	Yuto Aijima	4:31
4	Masayuki Mitomi	1	Yuto Aijima	3:57
5	Rion Mizuki	4	Michael Nakazawa	5:26
6	Yuto Aijima	5	Michael Nakazawa and Tomomitsu Matsunaga	6:13
7	DJ Nira	13	Akihiro	11:52
8	Michael Nakazawa	6	Sumo Yoshihiko	7:58
9	Tomomitsu Matsunaga	11	Akihiro	11:31
10	Kazuki Hirata	12	Akihiro	11:52
11	Sumo Yoshihiko	7	Kazuki Hirata and Tomomitsu Matsunaga	8:15
12	Akihiro	—	—	Winner
