= DDT Is Coming to America =

DDT Pro-Wrestling pay-per-view event

- Promotional poster of the event
- Promotion: DDT Pro-Wrestling
- Date: April 4, 2019
- City: Queens, New York
- Venue: La Boom
- Attendance: 650

DDT Is Coming to America chronology
← Previous —	Next → TJPW Is Coming to America with DDT

DDT Is Coming to America was a professional wrestling event produced by DDT Pro-Wrestling (DDT), The event took place on April 4, 2019, at La Boom in Queens, New York. This event was broadcast live on FITE TV. This event was the first DDT show in the United States.

== Event ==
During the event, the Ironman Heavymetalweight Championship changed hands several times during and in between matches. At 20:07, before the opening match, Makoto Oishi pinned Saki Akai to become the 1,351st champion.

During the delayed battle royale, Yoshihiko eliminated Makoto Oishi to become the 1,352nd champion, then Kazuki Hirata eliminated Yoshihiko to win the match and become the 1,353rd champion.

After that, at 20:40, Saki Akai pinned Kazuki Hirata to become the 1,354th champion.

After the last match, Makoto Oishi, Kazuki Hirata, Maki Itoh and Danshoku Dino became respectively the 1,355th, 1,356th, 1,357th and 1,358th champions by pinning each other successively.

== Results ==
No.	Results	Stipulations	Times
1	Damnation (Soma Takao and Tetsuya Endo) defeated Shuten-dōji (Masahiro Takanashi and Yukio Sakaguchi)	Tag team match	9:27
2	Kazuki Hirata won by last eliminating Yoshihiko	Delayed battle royale for the Ironman Heavymetalweight Championship; Hirata also won Yoshihiko's Right To Challenge Anytime, Anywhere contract	11:36
3	Harashima and Kazusada Higuchi defeated Akito and Ethan Page and Renegades (Jason Kincaid and Shigehiro Irie)	Three-way tag team match	8:54
4	Sanshiro Takagi defeated Mao	Weapon Rumble in U.S.A. match	12:26
5	Miyu Yamashita defeated Maki Itoh	Singles match	6:49
6	Joey Ryan and Royce Isaacs defeated Antonio Honda and Danshoku Dino	Tag team match	13:19
7	Daisuke Sasaki defeated Konosuke Takeshita (c)	Singles match for the KO-D Openweight Championship	19:00
8	Tetsuya Endo defeated Daisuke Sasaki (c)	Singles match for the KO-D Openweight Championship; This was Endo's Right To Challenge Anytime, Anywhere cash-in match	4:03
(c) / – the champion(s) heading into the match

=== Delayed battle royale entrances and eliminations ===
– Winner

Draw	Entrant	Order	Eliminated by	Time of elimination	Eliminations
1	Kazuki Hirata	—	Winner	—	2
2	Saki Akai	4	Makoto Oishi	06:55	0
3	Kikutaro	1	Doctor stoppage (Note: The "New York State Athletic Commission"/ring side physician ruled that due to high blood pressure Kikutaro would not be able to compete.)	02:24	0
4	Colt Cabana	2	Kazuki Hirata	05:32	0
5	Mizuki Watase	3	Yuu	06:40	0
6	Makoto Oishi (c)	6	Yoshihiko (Note: Yoshihiko became the 1,352nd champion.)	10:04	2
7	Yuu	5	Makoto Oishi	08:44	1
8	Yoshihiko	7	Kazuki Hirata (Note: Hirata became the 1,353rd champion.)	11:36	1

== See also ==
- 2019 in professional wrestling
