= Lucha VaVoom =

American professional wrestling promotion

- Acronym: LVV
- Founded: 2003
- Style: Lucha libre
- Headquarters: Los Angeles
- Website: http://luchavavoom.com/

Lucha VaVOOM is a professional wrestling and Burlesque promotion based in Los Angeles, California. Founded in 2003.

== Gallery ==
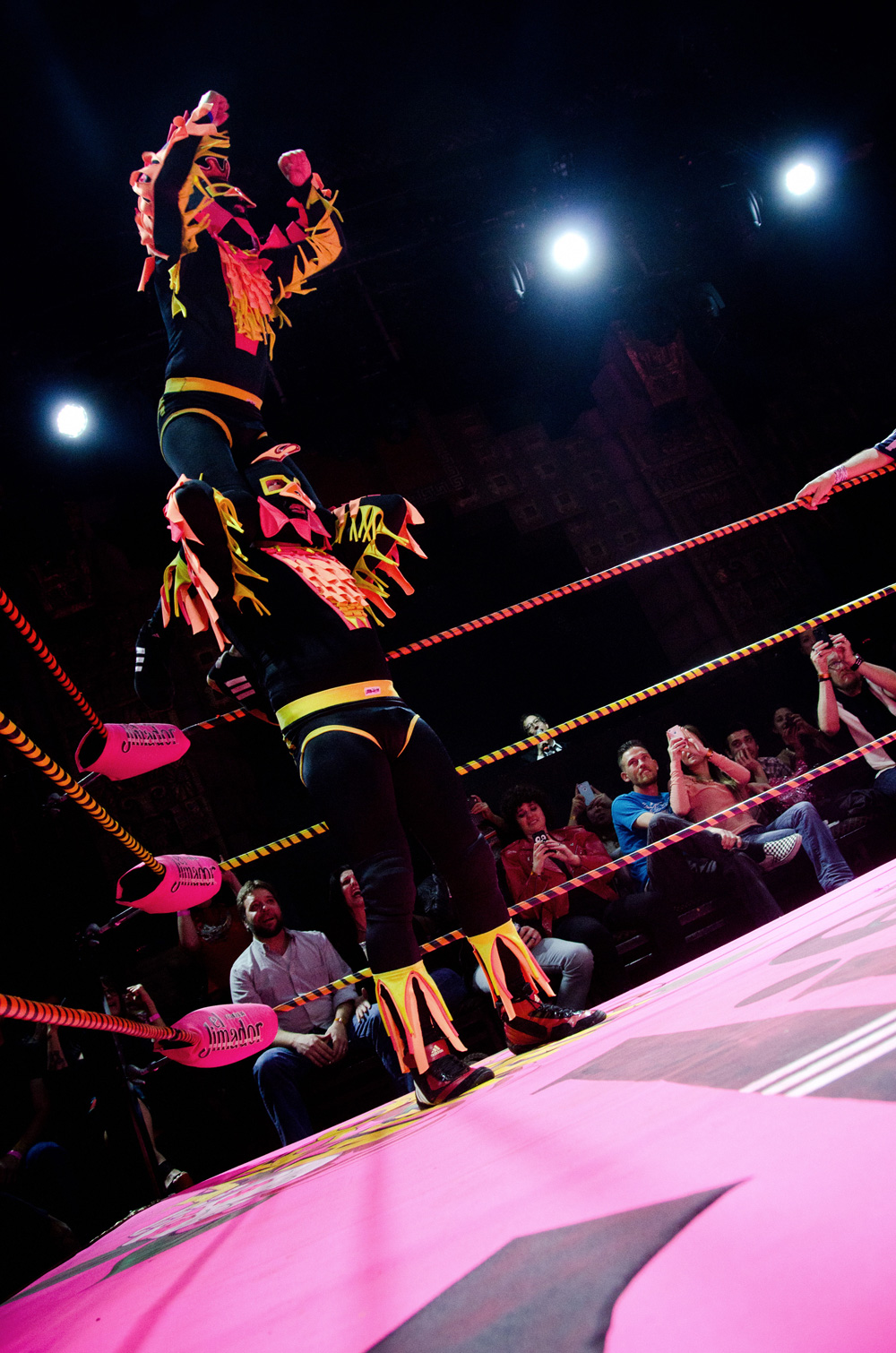

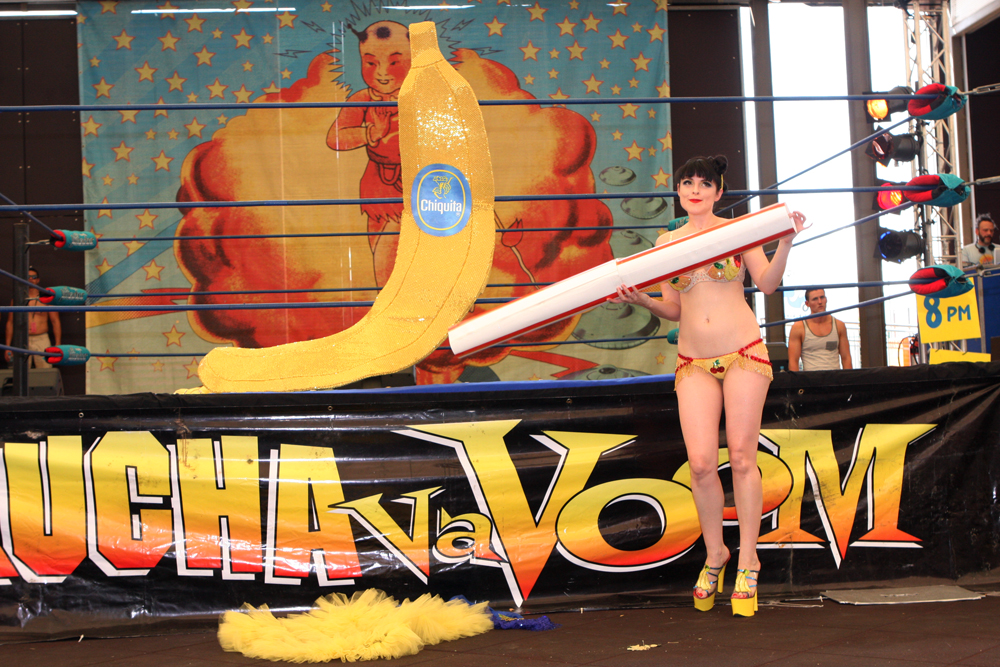
Lucha VaVOOM at Big Day Out, 2013

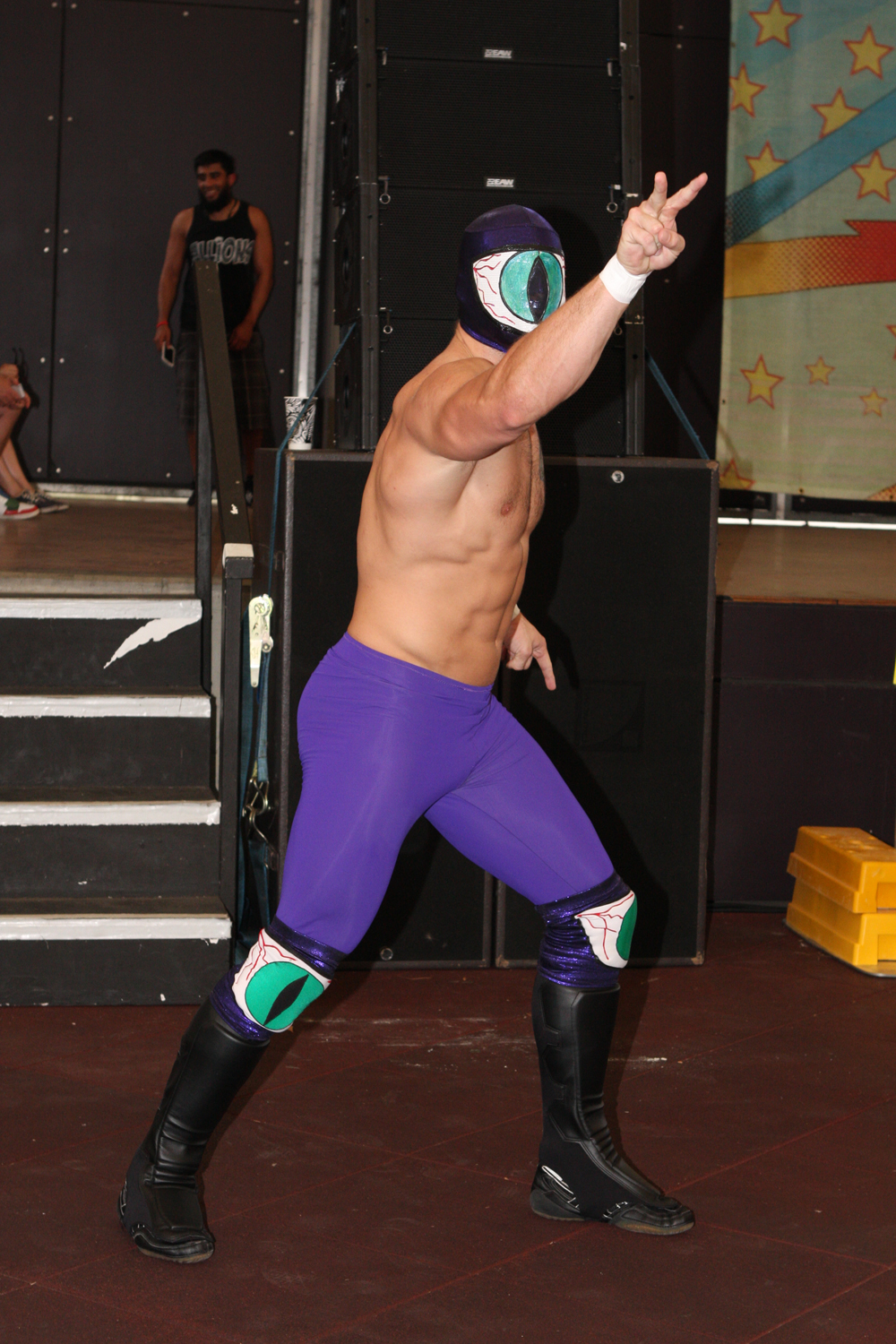

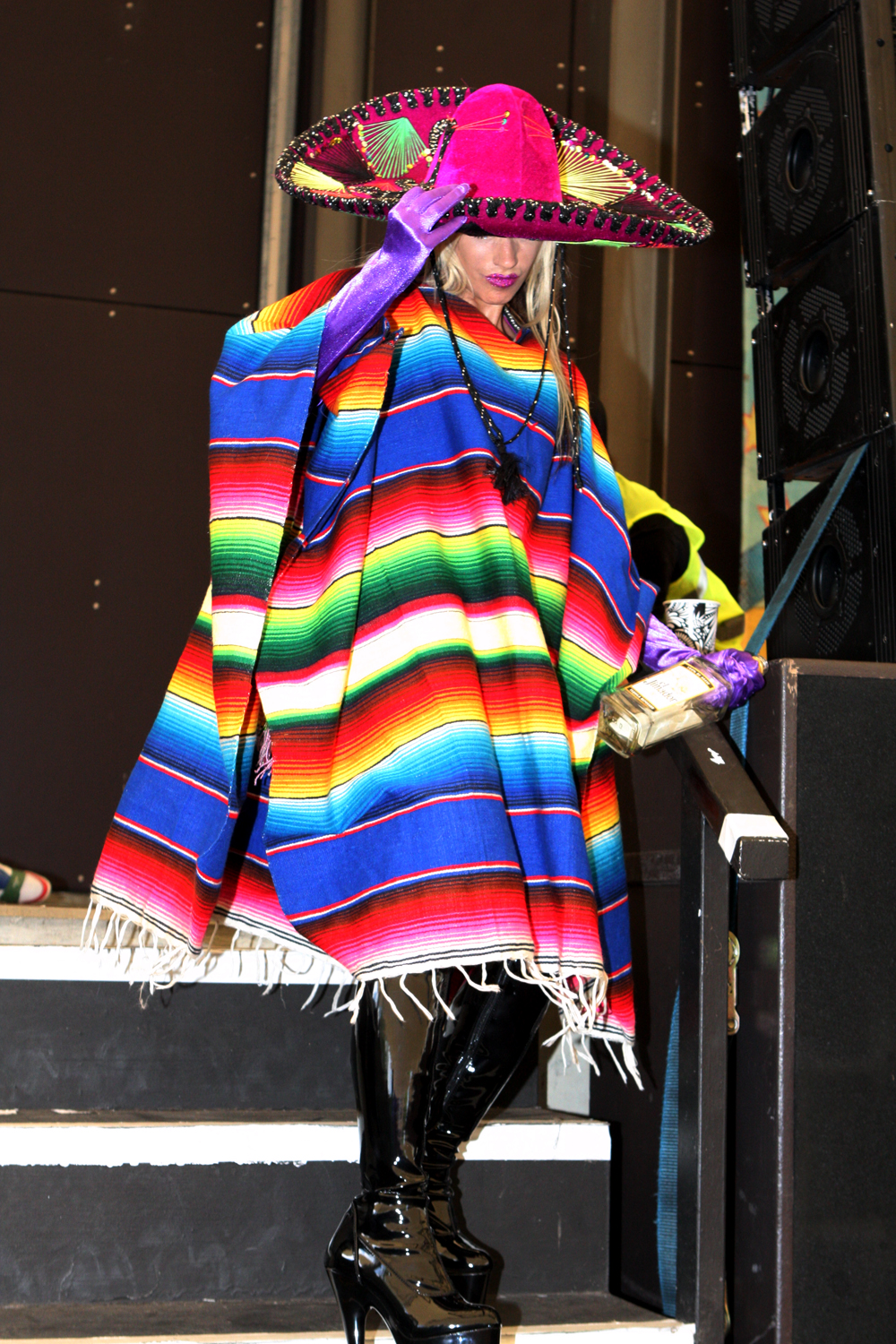

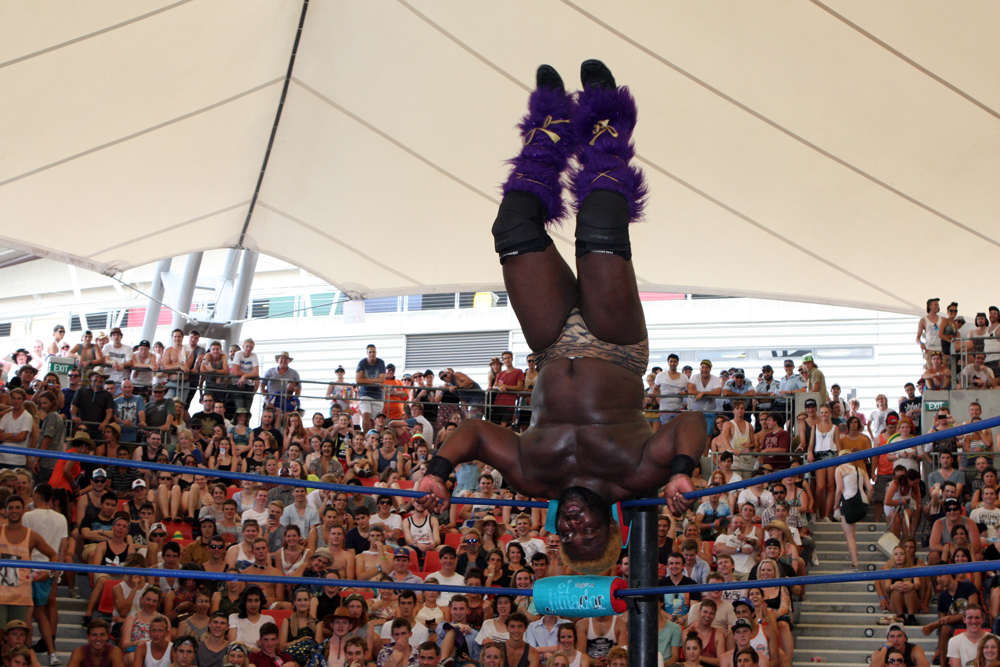

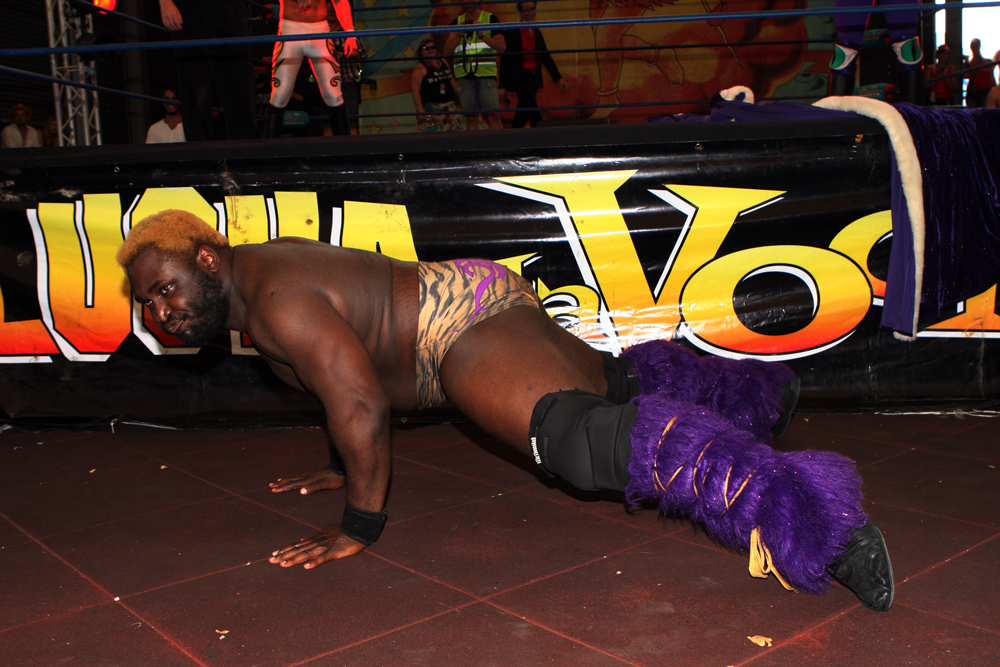

== See also ==
- Lucha libre
- Exótico
