= Ryōgoku Peter Pan 2014 =

2014 DDT Pro-Wrestling event

Ryōgoku Peter Pan 2014: Maybe Summer Will Change My Life!
- Promotion: DDT Pro-Wrestling
- Date: August 17, 2014
- City: Tokyo, Japan
- Venue: Ryōgoku Kokugikan
- Attendance: 9,100

Pay-per-view chronology
← Previous; Judgement 2014	Next → Never Mind 2014

Peter Pan chronology
← Previous; 2013	Next → 2015

Ryōgoku Peter Pan 2014: Maybe Summer Will Change My Life! (両国ピーターパン2014〜人生変えちゃう夏かもね!〜, Ryōgoku Pītā Pan 2014: jinsei kaechau natsu kamo ne) was a professional wrestling event promoted by DDT Pro-Wrestling (DDT). The event took place on August 17, 2014, in Tokyo at the Ryōgoku Kokugikan. The event featured eleven matches, four of which were contested for championships. The event aired on Fighting TV Samurai.

== Storylines ==
The Ryōgoku Peter Pan 2014 event featured eleven professional wrestling matches that involved different wrestlers from pre-existing scripted feuds and storylines. Wrestlers portrayed villains, heroes, or less distinguishable characters in the scripted events that built tension and culminated in a wrestling match or series of matches.

By winning the King of DDT tournament on June 29, Isami Kodaka earned a title match in the main event against KO-D Openweight Champion Harashima. Kenny Omega was later added to the match, making it a three-way.

== Event ==
The first dark match was a Tokyo Joshi Pro Wrestling exhibition match featuring Kanna, Erin, Chikage Kiba, Yuka Sakazaki, Shoko Nakajima and Miyu Yamashita.

The second dark match was a "DDT vs. Union Pro-Wrestling" eight-man tag team match pitting a team of four DDT wrestlers against four Union Pro wrestlers.

On the main card, Mikami teamed up with Pro-Wrestling Freedoms' Gentaro to face the team of Yasu Urano and Akito.

The next match was the "Souken Group Presents Ironman Heavymetalweight Championship Battle Royale", a Rumble rules match for the Ironman Heavymetalweight Championship that saw Akihiro, an inflatable love doll, enter as the champion. LiLiCo was the special guest ring announcer. Amongst the participants was Kizaemon Saiga, a mixed martial artist. During the match, DJ Nira pinned Akihiro to eliminate it from the match and become the 1,007th champion. Gorgeous Matsuno then eliminated DJ Nira to win the match and become the 1,008th champion.

After the match, LiLiCo pinned Gorgeous Matsuno by surprise to become the 1,009th champion, by virtue of the championship's 24/7 rule.

The next match saw the participation of Aja Kong from Oz Academy.

The "Important Something Time Bombing Deathmatch" was a match in which "an important something" was to be blown up after ten minutes had gone by. Just before the match, it was announced that the important something was the anus of Ryota Yamasato, a comedian who acted as an interviewer for DDT.

In the next match, Sanshiro Takagi teamed up with Jun Kasai from Pro-Wrestling Freedoms to face Minoru Suzuki and Michael Nakazawa in a Falls Count Anywhere Street Fight that saw the action spill out all around the arena.

In the next match, Kota Ibushi fought Shuji Kondo from Wrestle-1.

In the next match, Konosuke Takeshita faced Hiroshi Tanahashi from New Japan Pro-Wrestling.

== Results ==
No.	Results	Stipulations	Times
1^{D}	Miyu Yamashita, Chikage Kiba and Kanna defeated Shoko Nakajima, Yuka Sakazaki and Erin	Six-woman tag team match	8:52
2^{D}	Hoshitango, Rion Mizuki, Gota Ihashi and Shunma Katsumata defeated Daichi Kazato, Sagat, Masayuki Mitomi and Tomoya Kawamura	Eight-man tag team match	7:44
3	Mikami and Gentaro defeated Yasu Urano and Akito	Tag team match	11:07
4	Gorgeous Matsuno won by last eliminating DJ Nira	Rumble rules match for the Ironman Heavymetalweight Championship	16:56
5	Saki Akai, Makoto Oishi and Ladybeard defeated Aja Kong, Antonio Honda and Hiroshi Fukuda	Six-man tag team match	11:43
6	Team Dream Futures (Keisuke Ishii, Shigehiro Irie and Soma Takao) defeated Shuten-dōji (Kudo, Yukio Sakaguchi and Masa Takanashi) (c)	Six-man tag team match for the KO-D 6-Man Tag Team Championship	10:57
7	Danshoku Dino (c) defeated Muscle Sakai	Important Something Time Bombing Deathmatch for the DDT Extreme Championship	11:05
8	Sanshiro Takagi and Jun Kasai defeated Minoru Suzuki and Michael Nakazawa	Falls Count Anywhere Street Fight	23:25
9	Kota Ibushi defeated Shuji Kondo	Singles match	18:39
10	Hiroshi Tanahashi defeated Konosuke Takeshita	Singles match	15:09
11	Harashima (c) defeated Kenny Omega and Isami Kodaka	Three-way elimination match for the KO-D Openweight Championship	24:56
(c) / – the champion(s) heading into the match; D / – this was a dark match

=== Rumble rules match ===
Order	Name	Order eliminated	By	Time
1	Daisuke Sasaki	7	Shiro Koshinaka	11:59
2	Tetsuya Endo	4	Akihiro and Yoshihiko	8:52
3	Ai Shimizu	1	Daisuke Sasaki	2:56
4	Tomomitsu Matsunaga	8	Shiro Koshinaka	12:24
5	Kazuki Hirata	9	Shiro Koshinaka	15:33
6	Fuma	3	Yoshihiko	8:52
7	Kizaemon Saiga	2	Akihiro	8:20
8	DJ Nira	13	Gorgeous Matsuno	16:56
9	Akihiro (c)	6	DJ Nira (Note: DJ Nira becomes the 1,007th Ironman Heavymetalweight Champion.)	11:04
10	Yoshihiko	5	DJ Nira	11:04
11	Toru Owashi	11	Nonoko	16:24
12	Shiro Koshinaka	10	Nonoko	16:24
13	Gorgeous Matsuno	—	—	Winner
14	Nonoko	12	DJ Nira and Gorgeous Matsuno	16:30

=== Three-way elimination match ===
Eliminated	Wrestler	Eliminated by	Method	Time
1	Kenny Omega	Harashima	Pinfall	17:52
2	Isami Kodaka	Harashima	Pinfall	24:56
Winner:	Harashima			
