= Ryōgoku Peter Pan 2010 =

2010 DDT Pro-Wrestling event

Ryōgoku Peter Pan 2010: Summer Vacation
- Promotion: DDT Pro-Wrestling
- Date: July 25, 2010
- City: Tokyo, Japan
- Venue: Ryōgoku Kokugikan
- Attendance: 8,800

Peter Pan chronology
← Previous; 2009	Next → 2011

Ryōgoku Peter Pan 2010: Summer Vacation (両国ピーターパン2010 〜夏休み ああ夏休み 夏休み〜, Ryōgoku Pītā Pan 2010: Natsuyasumi Aa Natsuyasumi Natsuyasumi) was a professional wrestling event promoted by DDT Pro-Wrestling (DDT). The full official name of the event could be translated as "Summer vacation! Ah! Summer vacation, summer vacation...". The event took place on July 25, 2010, in Tokyo at the Ryōgoku Kokugikan. The event featured nine matches, three of which were contested for championships. The event aired on Fighting TV Samurai and the dark match was broadcast on ustream.

== Storylines ==
The Ryōgoku Peter Pan 2010 event featured nine professional wrestling matches that involved different wrestlers from pre-existing scripted feuds and storylines. Wrestlers portrayed villains, heroes, or less distinguishable characters in the scripted events that built tension and culminated in a wrestling match or series of matches.

By winning the KO-D Openweight Championship Contendership Tournament on May 30, Harashima earned a title match in the main event against KO-D Openweight Champion Daisuke Sekimoto.

== Event ==
As in the previous year, Michael Nakazawa's anal blast was held as the opening ceremony. The amount of gunpowder was twice that of the previous year. Announcer Hidekazu Tanaka was the host of the ceremony and Masahiro Chono triggered the detonation.

In the dark match preceding the main card, Sanshiro Takagi and Munenori Sawa from Battlarts defended the KO-D Tag Team Championship in a Falls Count Anywhere match against the team of Jun Kasai and Kamui from Pro-Wrestling Freedoms. The match quickly spilled outside of the ring and all over the building.

On the main card, Mr. #6 teamed with Great Kojika from Big Japan Pro Wrestling and Riho from Ice Ribbon to unify their Sea of Japan 6-Person Tag Team Championship with the UWA World Trios Championship held by the team of Hikaru Sato, Keisuke Ishii and Yoshihiko, and the Jiyūgaoka 6-Person Tag Team Championship held by the team of Kudo, Yasu Urano and Antonio Honda.

The gauntlet match saw the participation of Manabu Nakanishi from New Japan Pro-Wrestling who teamed with Poison Sawada Julie.

The next match involved Tajiri from the newly founded Smash promotion.

In the sixth match, Naomichi Marufuji from Pro Wrestling Noah was originally supposed to face Kota Ibushi, however, due to Ibushi suffering an injury before the show, his tag team partner Kenny Omega was named as his replacement. Because of this, Omega had to vacate the Sea of Japan 6-Person Tag Team Championship he was holding with Mr. #6 and Riho since June 13, and Great Kojika was declared champion on July 20 so that he could defend the title at Ryōgoku Peter Pan 2010.

== Results ==
No.	Results	Stipulations	Times
1^{D}	Sanshiro Takagi and Munenori Sawa (c) defeated Jun Kasai and Kamui by submission	Falls Count Anywhere tag team match for the KO-D Tag Team Championship	16:30
2	Daisuke Sasaki, Soma Takao and Kazuki Hirata defeated Shigehiro Irie, Tatsuhiko Yoshino and Akito	Six-man tag team match	11:21
3	Great Kojika, Mr. #6 and Riho (Sea of Japan) defeated Hikaru Sato, Keisuke Ishii and Yoshihiko (UWA) and Kudo, Yasu Urano and Antonio Honda (Jiyūgaoka)	Three-way six-man tag team unification match for the UWA World Trios Championship, the Jiyugaoka 6-Person Tag Team Championship and the Sea of Japan 6-Person Tag Team Championship	12:02
4	Suicide Boyz (Mikami and Thanomsak Toba) defeated Wild Snake (Manabu Nakanishi and Poison Sawada Julie), Ningen Shitei (Toru Owashi and Yukihiro Abe), Massive Brothers (Muscle Sakai and Jiro Hachimitsu) and Josai International (Goro Tsurumi and Tomomitsu Matsunaga)	Gauntlet tag team match to determine the #1 contenders to the KO-D Tag Team Championship	23:29
5	Tajiri defeated Dick Togo	Singles match	6:22
6	Michael Nakazawa (captain), Sanshiro Takagi and Munenori Sawa defeated Yago Aznable (captain), MA Hoshitango and Anabel Taro	One Year Contract War - No Disqualification Captain's Fall six-man tag team match	14:05
7	Naomichi Marufuji defeated Kenny Omega	Singles match	20:06
8	Danshoku Dino defeated HG and RG by submission	Two-on-one handicap match	14:03
9	Harashima defeated Daisuke Sekimoto (c)	Singles match for the KO-D Openweight Championship	22:24
(c) / – the champion(s) heading into the match; D / – this was a dark match

=== Gauntlet match ===
Elimination	Wrestler	Team	Eliminated by	Elimination move	Time	Ref.
1	Tomomitsu Matsunaga	Josai International	Jiro Hachimitsu	Ankle lock	5:31	
2	Muscle Sakai	Massive Brothers	Yukihiro Abe	Pin	7:36	
3	Yukihiro Abe	Ningen Shitei	Thanomsak Toba	Pinned with La Magistral	12:50	
4	Poison Sawada Julie	Wild Snake	Mikami	Pinned after a Volcanic Bomb	23:29	
Winners:	Suicide Boyz (Mikami and Thanomsak Toba)					
