= Tomomitsu Matsunaga =

Japanese wrestler (born 1980)

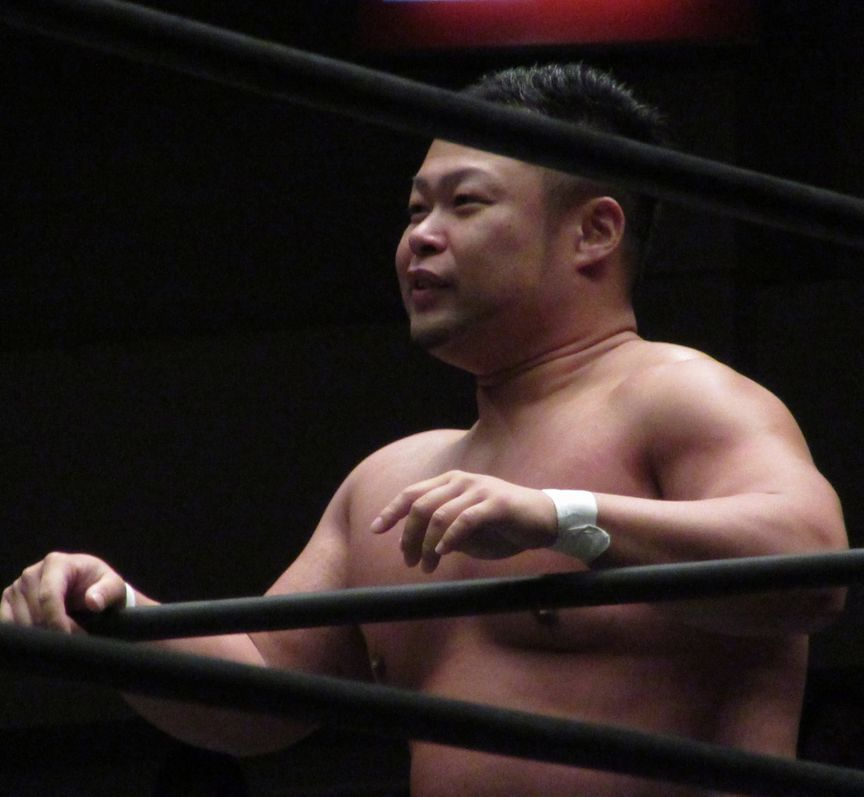
- Matsunaga in May 2016

Personal information
- Born: November 13, 1980 (age 45) Koga, Japan

Professional wrestling career
- Ring name(s): Darkside HERO! Omori Utaemon; Tomomitsu Matsunaga
- Billed height: 168 cm (5 ft 6 in)
- Billed weight: 95 kg (209 lb)
- Trained by: Dick Togo
- Debut: 2006

Tomomitsu Matsunaga (松永智充, Matsunaga Tomomitsu; born November 13, 1980) is a Japanese professional wrestler working for DDT Pro-Wrestling (DDT), a Japanese promotion where he is a former Ironman Heavymetalweight Champion.

== Professional wrestling career ==
=== Independent circuit (2006–present) ===
Matsunaga is known for competing in various promotions. He participated in one of the longest matches in professional wrestling history, a 108-man battle royal at Tenka Sanbun no Kei: New Year's Eve Special, a cross-over event held between Big Japan Pro Wrestling (BJW), DDT and Kaientai Dojo (K-Dojo) from December 31, 2009, competing against other infamous wrestlers such as Great Kojika, Taka Michinoku, Yoshihito Sasaki, Abdullah Kobayashi, and the winner of the match, Jun Kasai. At BJW/DDT/K-DOJO New Year's Eve Toshikoshi Pro-Wrestling, a cross-over event produced by BJW, K-Dojo and DDT on December 31, 2012, he wrestled in a 12-man Cinderella Title battle royal also involving Emi Sakura, Ricky Fuji, Yasu Urano and others.

==== DDT Pro-Wrestling (2006–present) ====
Matsunaga made his professional wrestling debut in DDT at DDT Non-Fix 5/19, an event promoted on May 19, 2006, where he teamed up with Sanshiro Takagi and The Mac, scoring a victory over Antonio Honda, Francesco Togo and Mori Bernard in a six-man tag team match.

Matsunaga is known for his appearance in various signature events promoted by the promotion such as the DDT Peter Pan. He marked his first appearance at the first-ever event, the Ryōgoku Peter Pan 2009 from August 23 where he competed in a Rumble rules match for the Ironman Heavymetalweight Championship also involving Yumiko Hotta, Giru Nakano, Riho and others. At Ryōgoku Peter Pan 2018 on October 21, he teamed up with Michael Nakazawa and unsuccessfully competed in a Gauntlet tag team match also involving Shuten-dōji (Kudo and Masahiro Takanashi) defeated Mike Bailey and Antonio Honda, Renegades (Mizuki Watase and Jason "The Gift" Kincaid), Kazusada Higuchi and Kota Umeda, and Tanomusaku Toba and Keisuke Okuda. At Wrestle Peter Pan 2019 on July 15, he participated in a Rumble rules match for the Ironman Heavymetalweight Championship also involving the winner Yukio Sakaguchi, Gorgeous Matsuno, Shiro Koshinaka, Joey Ryan and others. His last match occurred on the first night of the Wrestle Peter Pan 2020 from June 6, where he teamed up with Sanshiro Takagi and Kazusada Higuchi in a losing effort to Kongo (Kenoh, Masa Kitamiya and Haoh).

Matsunaga is also known for competing in the DDT Judgement branch of events, especially in Rumble rules match for the Ironman Heavymetalweight Championship. His last appearance occurred at Judgement 2019: DDT 22nd Anniversary on February 17 where he wrestled in such a match also involving Saki Akai, Gota Ihashi, Hoshitango, Mina Shirakawa and others. Two years earlier, at Judgement 2017: DDT 20th Anniversary he made another appearance in this kind of match, this time also for the King of Dark Championship also involving Guanchulo, Poison Sawada Julie, Gentaro, Munenori Sawa and others. At Judgement 2016: DDT 19th Anniversary on March 21, Matsunaga competed in a #1 Contendership & Right To Challenge Anytime, Anywhere Contract Battle Royal with the winner getting an opportunity to battle for the KO-D Openweight Championship also involving Ryuichi Sekine, Masa Takanashi, Cherry, Ken Ohka and others.

Another event promoted by DDT in which Mastunaga competed is the DDT Ultimate Party. His only match occurred at Ultimate Party 2019 on November 3 where he teamed up with Mizuki Watase and Keigo Nakamura in a losing effort to Daichi Kazato, Masato Kamino and Shuhei Washida.

On the DDT Into The Fight branch of events, Matsunaga scored his last appearance at Into The Fight 2019 on March 21 where he worked in two different matches. In the first one he teamed up with Hiroshi Yamato, Sanshiro Takagi, Masahiro Takanashi and Keisuke Okuda to defeat Michael Nakazawa in a Five-on-one handicap match, and in the second one he teamed up with Nakazawa as "Nuru Nuru Brothers" and Takanashi to defeat Sanshiro Takagi, Keisuke Okuda and Hiroshi Yamato.

As for the King of DDT Tournament, Matsunaga scored his best result at the 2014 edition of the event where he defeated Kenny Omega in the first-round but fell short to Kudo in the second round.

== Championships and accomplishments ==
- DDT Pro-Wrestling
  - Ironman Heavymetalweight Championship (10 times)
  - Jiyūgaoka 6-Person Tag Team Championship (1 time) – with Hikaru Sato and Michael Nakazawa
  - KO-D Tag Team Championship (1 time) – with Michael Nakazawa
  - Sea Of Japan 6-Person Tag Team Championship (1 time) – with Hikaru Sato and Michael Nakazawa
  - UWA World Trios Championship (1 time) – with Hikaru Sato and Michael Nakazawa

== Luchas de Apuestas record ==
Winner (wager)	Loser (wager)	Location	Event	Date	Notes
Michael Nakazawa & Tomomitsu Matsunaga (hair)	Danshoku Dino & Rion Mizuki (hair)	Korakuen Hall	DDT Day Dream Believer 2007	October 21, 2007	
