= Sea of Japan 6-Person Tag Team Championship =

Professional wrestling trios tag team championship

Details
- Promotion: DDT Pro-Wrestling
- Date established: 2003
- Date retired: November 3, 2010 (unified with the UWA World Trios Championship)
Statistics
- First champions: Mr. Strawberry, Yoshihiro Sakai and O.K. Revolution
- Final champions: Shit Heart♥Foundation (Hikaru Sato, Michael Nakazawa and Tomomitsu Matsunaga)
- Most reigns: As individual: Riho and Mr. #6 (2 reigns)

The Sea of Japan 6-Person Tag Team Championship (日本海6人タッグ王座, Nihonkai Roku-nin Taggu Ōza) was a six-person tag team title in the Japanese professional wrestling promotion Dramatic Dream Team, today known as DDT Pro-Wrestling. The title was established in 2003. It has since been unified with the UWA World Trios Championship.

== Title history ==
=== Championship tournament ===
On July 20, 2003, a four-team tournament was held to crown the inaugural champions.

Round 1
Team Midbreath (Mr. Strawberry, Yoshihiro Sakai and O.K. Revolution)	Pin
Shoichi Ichimiya, Seiya Morohashi and Futoshi Miwa	11:29
Super Uchuu Power, Tomohiko Hashimoto and Shuji Ishikawa	Pin
Takashi Sasaki, Thanomsak Toba and King Lion	9:43

Finals
Team Midbreath (Mr. Strawberry, Yoshihiro Sakai and O.K. Revolution)	Pin
Super Uchuu Power, Tomohiko Hashimoto and Shuji Ishikawa	10:34

== Reigns ==
Key
No.	Overall reign number
Reign	Reign number for the specific team—reign numbers for the individuals are in parentheses, if different
Days	Number of days held
Defenses	Number of successful defenses
<1	Reign lasted less than a day

No.	Champion	Championship change			Reign statistics			Notes	Ref.
No.	Champion	Date	Event	Location	Reign	Days	Defenses	Notes	Ref.
1	Team Midbreath (Mr. Strawberry, Yoshihiro Sakai and O.K. Revolution)	July 20, 2003	Yoshihiro Sakai: I Shall Return	Niigata, Japan	1	2,520	0	Defeated Super Uchuu Power, Tomohiko Hashimoto and Shuji Ishikawa in a tournament final to become the inaugural champions. Yoshihiro Sakai changed his name to Muscle Sakai during this reign.	
2	Kenny Omega, Riho and Mr. #6	June 13, 2010	What Are You Doing? 2010	Tokyo, Japan	1	37	0		
—	Vacated	July 20, 2010	—	—	—	—	—	Title vacated when Omega was chosen to replace Kota Ibushi at Ryōgoku Peter Pan 2010.	
3	Great Kojika, Riho and Mr. #6	July 24, 2010	—	—	1 (1, 2, 2)	102	2	Title awarded to Kojika, Riho and Mr. #6.	
4	Shit Heart♥Foundation (Hikaru Sato, Michael Nakazawa and Tomomitsu Matsunaga)	November 3, 2010	Shin-Kiba 5th Anniversary Special	Tokyo, Japan	1	<1	0	This was also for the UWA World Trios Championship and the Jiyūgaoka 6-Person Tag Team Championship.	
—	Unified	November 3, 2010	Shin-Kiba 5th Anniversary Special	Tokyo, Japan	—	—	—	Title unified with the UWA World Trios Championship.	

== Combined reigns ==
=== By team ===
Rank	Wrestler	No. of reigns	Combined defenses	Combined days
1	Team Midbreath (Mr. Strawberry, Yoshihiro Sakai and O.K. Revolution)	1	0	2,520
2	Great Kojika, Riho and Mr. #6	1	2	102
3	Kenny Omega, Riho and Mr. #6	1	0	37
4	Shit Heart♥Foundation (Hikaru Sato, Michael Nakazawa and Tomomitsu Matsunaga)	1	0	<1

=== By wrestler ===
Rank	Wrestler	No. of reigns	Combined defenses	Combined days
1	Mr. Strawberry	1	0	2,520
1	O.K. Revolution	1	0	2,520
1	Yoshihiro Sakai	1	0	2,520
4	Mr. #6	2	2	139
4	Riho	2	2	139
6	Great Kojika	1	2	102
7	Kenny Omega	1	0	37
8	Tomomitsu Matsunaga	1	0	<1
8	Michael Nakazawa	1	0	<1
8	Hikaru Sato	1	0	<1

== See also ==
- Professional wrestling in Japan
