= Jiyūgaoka 6-Person Tag Team Championship =

Professional wrestling trios tag team championship

Details
- Promotion: DDT Pro-Wrestling
- Date established: 2003
- Date retired: December 23, 2012

Other name
- Jiyūgaoka Main Street 6-Person Tag Team Championship (Note: Japanese: 自由が丘広小路会認定6人タッグ王座, Hepburn: Jiyūgaoka Hirokōji-kai-nintei Roku-nin Taggu Ōza)
Statistics
- First champions: Sanshiro Takagi, Hero! and Etsuko Mita
- Final champions: Shit Heart♥Foundation (Hikaru Sato, Michael Nakazawa and Tomomitsu Matsunaga)

The Jiyūgaoka 6-Person Tag Team Championship (Japanese: 自由が丘6人タッグ王座, Hepburn: Jiyūgaoka Roku-nin Taggu Ōza) was a six-person tag team title in the Japanese professional wrestling promotion Dramatic Dream Team, today known as DDT Pro-Wrestling. The title, established in 2003, was named after the Jiyūgaoka neighborhood in Meguro. It has since been essentially replaced by the KO-D 6-Man Tag Team Championship.

== Title history ==
Key
No.	Overall reign number
Reign	Reign number for the specific team—reign numbers for the individuals are in parentheses, if different
Days	Number of days held
Defenses	Number of successful defenses
(NLT)	Championship change took place "no later than" the date listed
<1	Reign lasted less than a day

No.	Champion	Championship change			Reign statistics			Notes	Ref.
No.	Champion	Date	Event	Location	Reign	Days	Defenses	Notes	Ref.
1	Sanshiro Takagi, Hero! and Etsuko Mita	October 11, 2003	Jiyūgaoka Megami Festival Eve	Tokyo, Japan	1	(Note: The date of at least one of the title changes in this reign is uncertain, which means that the reign lasted between 448 and 728 days.)	0	Defeated Gill Nakano, Futoshi Miwa and Kaori Yoneyama to become the first champions.	
—	Vacated	2005 (NLT)	—	—	—	—	—		
2	Sanshiro Takagi, Poison Sawada and Jun Inomata	October 8, 2005	Jiyūgaoka Megami Festival	Tokyo, Japan	1 (2, 1, 1)	243	0	Defeated Antonio Honda, Don Maestro and Francesco Togo to win the vacant title.	
—	Vacated	June 8, 2006	—	—	—	—	—	Title vacated after Inomata retired from professional wrestling.	
3	Disaster Box (Harashima, Muscle Sakai and Yusuke Inokuma)	June 25, 2006	King of DDT 2006	Tokyo, Japan	1 (2, 1, 1)	332	0	Defeated Kudo, Masami Morohashi and Seiya Morohashi to win the vacant title. Harashima previously held the title under the name Hero!.	
—	Vacated	May 23, 2007	Non-Fix 5/23	Tokyo, Japan	—	—	—	Title vacated due to Harashima and Sakai being busy defending the KO-D Openweight and DDT Extreme Division Championships on June 3, 2007, during an event, where all DDT titles were scheduled to be on the line.	
4	Fruits Army (Durian Sawada Julie, Toru Momowashi and Mango Fukuda)	June 3, 2007	King of DDT 2007	Tokyo, Japan	1 (2, 1, 1)	<1	0	Defeated Antonio Honda, Prince Togo and King Alamoana to win the vacant title.	
—	Vacated	June 3, 2007	King of DDT 2007	Tokyo, Japan	—	—	—		
5	Kudo, Antonio Honda and Yasu Urano	July 6, 2008	King of DDT 2008	Tokyo, Japan	1	749	0	Defeated Koo, Super Vampire and Toru Owashi to win the vacant title.	
6	Great Kojika, Mr. #6 and Riho	July 25, 2010	Ryōgoku Peter Pan 2010	Tokyo, Japan	1	101	1	This was a three-way match also involving Hikaru Sato, Keisuke Ishii and Yoshihiko. The UWA World Trios Championship and Sea Of Japan 6-Person Tag Team Championship were also on the line in this match.	
7	Shit Heart♥Foundation (Hikaru Sato, Michael Nakazawa and Tomomitsu Matsunaga)	November 3, 2010	From DDT With Love: Shin-Kiba 5th Anniversary Special	Tokyo, Japan	1	781	0	The UWA World Trios Championship and Sea Of Japan 6-Person Tag Team Championship were also on the line in this match.	
—	Deactivated	December 23, 2012	—	—	—	—	—	Deactivated to be replaced with the newly created KO-D 6-Man Tag Team Championship.	

== Combined reigns ==
=== By team ===
¤	The exact length of at least one title reign is uncertain, so the shortest possible length is used.

Rank	Wrestler	No. of reigns	Combined defenses	Combined days
1	Shit Heart♥Foundation (Hikaru Sato, Michael Nakazawa and Tomomitsu Matsunaga)	1	0	781
2	Kudo, Antonio Honda and Yasu Urano	1	0	749
3	Sanshiro Takagi, Hero! and Etsuko Mita	1	0	448¤
4	Disaster Box (Harashima, Muscle Sakai and Yusuke Inokuma)	1	0	332
5	Sanshiro Takagi, Poison Sawada and Jun Inomata	1	0	243
6	Great Kojika, Mr. #6 and Riho	1	1	101
7	Fruits Army (Durian Sawada Julie, Toru Momowashi and Mango Fukuda)	1	0	<1

=== By wrestler ===
¤	The exact length of at least one title reign is uncertain, so the shortest possible length is used.

Rank	Wrestler	No. of reigns	Combined defenses	Combined days
1	Hikaru Sato	1	0	781
1	Michael Nakazawa	1	0	781
1	Tomomitsu Matsunaga	1	0	781
4	Hero!/Harashima	2	0	780¤
5	Kudo	1	0	749
5	Antonio Honda	1	0	749
5	Yasu Urano	1	0	749
8	Sanshiro Takagi	2	0	691¤
9	Etsuko Mita	1	0	448¤
10	Muscle Sakai	1	0	332
10	Yusuke Inokuma	1	0	332
12	Poison Sawada/Durian Sawada Julie	2	0	243
12	Jun Inomata	1	0	243
14	Great Kojika	1	1	101
14	Mr. #6	1	1	101
14	Riho	1	1	101
17	Mango Fukuda	1	0	<1
17	Toru Momowashi	1	0	<1

== See also ==
- Professional wrestling in Japan
