= UWA World Trios Championship =

Professional wrestling trios tag team championship

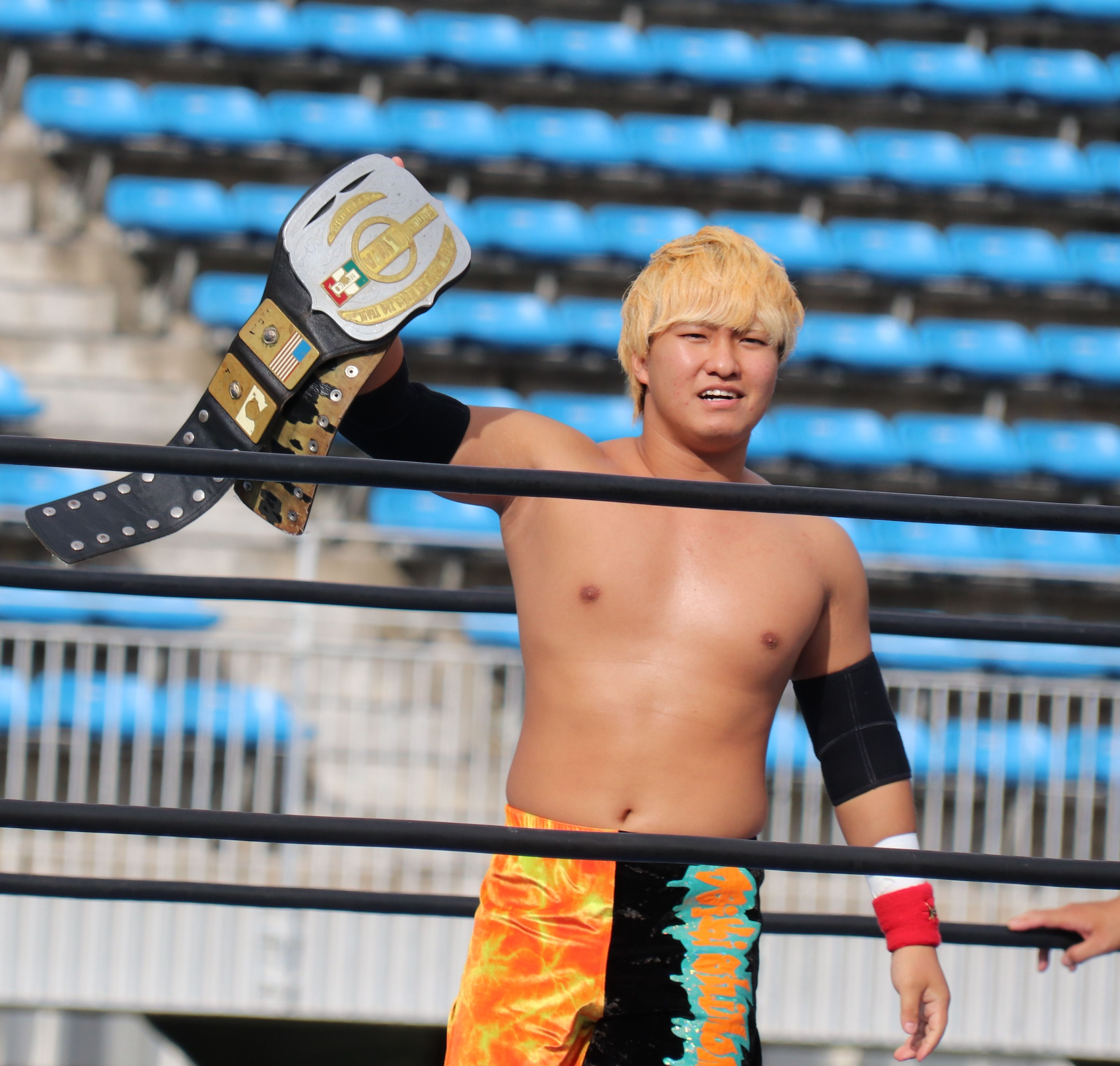
- Daiki Shimomura with one of the titles

Details
- Promotion: UWA (1984–1995); Toryumon (2001–2004); El Dorado (2006–2008); DDT (2009–2012; 2019); Wrestle-1 (2015–2018); BJW (2019–present); Basara (2019–present)
- Date established: 1984
- Current champions: Aagan Iisou (Shuji Kondo, Takuya Sugawara and Toru Owashi)
- Date won: October 24, 2021
Statistics
- First champions: Black Man, Kung Fu and Kato Kung Lee
- Most reigns: Los Villanos (Villano I, Villano IV and Villano V) (5 reigns)
- Longest reign: Aagan Iisou (Shuji Kondo, Takuya Sugawara and Toru Owashi) (1,791 days)
- Shortest reign: Fujita, Mazada and Nosawa Rongai (1 day)

The UWA World Trios Championship is a tag team professional wrestling championship created by the Mexican Universal Wrestling Association and defended there until the UWA closed in 1995. Since then, the championship has been defended in various promotions in Japan.

As it is a professional wrestling championship, the championship is not won not by actual competition, but by a scripted ending to a match determined by the bookers and match makers. (Note: Hornbaker (2016) p. 550: "Professional wrestling is a sport in which match finishes are predetermined. Thus, win–loss records are not indicative of a wrestler's genuine success based on their legitimate abilities – but on now much, or how little they were pushed by promoters") On occasion the promotion declares a championship vacant, which means there is no champion at that point in time. This can either be due to a storyline, (Note: Duncan & Will (2000) p. 271, Chapter: Texas: NWA American Tag Team Title [World Class, Adkisson] "Championship held up and rematch ordered because of the interference of manager Gary Hart") or real life issues such as a champion suffering an injury being unable to defend the championship, (Note: Duncan & Will (2000) p. 20, Chapter: (United States: 19th Century & widely defended titles – NWA, WWF, AWA, IW, ECW, NWA) NWA/WCW TV Title "Rhodes stripped on 85/10/19 for not defending the belt after having his leg broken by Ric Flair and Ole & Arn Anderson") or leaving the company. (Note: Duncan & Will (2000) p. 201, Chapter: (Memphis, Nashville) Memphis: USWA Tag Team Title "Vacant on 93/01/18 when Spike leaves the USWA.")

The current champions are Aagan Iisou (Shuji Kondo, Takuya Sugawara and Toru Owashi).

== History ==
After the UWA's closing, the title was inactive for many years before being recycled as trios belts for the Toryumon Japan promotion. The titles fell back into disrepair due to Último Dragón leaving Toryumon and taking the name with him, causing the then-Toryumon workers to create Dragon Gate, where they created new belts for the new company. After leaving Toryumon Japan, the titles ended up in the hands of its descendant promotion El Dorado and the Mexico based Toryumon Gym. Neither group promoted shows on a regular basis, which produced two unsuccessful attempts to relaunch the championship. In 2007, El Dorado revived the title again. In 2008 El Dorado Wrestling folded and the title moved to DDT Pro-Wrestling, where it was active until 2012, the final champions were Harashima, Toru Owashi and Yukihiro Abe. On August 30, 2015, it was announced that the title would be revived by the Wrestle-1 promotion on October 9. The title has since moved to Big Japan Pro Wrestling and DDT's Pro-Wrestling Basara sub-group.

== Reigns ==
Key
No.	Overall reign number
Reign	Reign number for the specific team—reign numbers for the individuals are in parentheses, if different
Days	Number of days held
Defenses	Number of successful defenses
N/A	Unknown information
†	Championship change is unrecognized by the promotion
+	Current reign is changing daily

No.	Champion	Championship change			Reign statistics			Notes	Ref.
No.	Champion	Date	Event	Location	Reign	Days	Defenses	Notes	Ref.
Universal Wrestling Association (UWA)
1	Los Fantásticos (Black Man, Kung Fu and Kato Kung Lee)	March 18, 1984	Live event	Naucalpan, Mexico	1	(Note: Due to sparse record keeping in Mexico at the time no documentation of the date the championship changed hands is found and is too uncertain to calculate.)	2	Defeated Los Cadetos del Espacio (El Solar, Super Astro and Ultraman) to become the first champions.	(Note: Duncan & Will (2000) p. 399, Chapter: MEXICO: UWA World Tag Team Title [Flores, Mora])
Championship history is unrecorded from April to December, 1984.
2	Los Misioneros de la Muerte (Negro Navarro, El Signo and El Texano)	1984	Live event	N/A	1		3		
Championship history is unrecorded from 1984 to 1985.
†	Los Brazos (El Brazo, Brazo de Oro and Brazo de Plata)	1985	Live event	—	—		0	Unclear if they defeated Los Misioneros de la Muerte to win the championship	
†	Los Villanos (Villano I, Villano IV and Villano V)	July 21, 1985	Live event	—	—		3		
Championship history is unrecorded from July 21, 1985 to April 24, 1987.
3	Los Misioneros de la Muerte (Negro Navarro, El Signo and El Texano)	April 24, 1987	Live event	Naucalpan, Mexico	2		0	Defeated Los Villanos (Villano III, Villano IV and Villano V).	
Championship history is unrecorded from April 24, 1987 to August 14, 1987.
4	Los Brazos (El Brazo, Brazo de Oro and Brazo de Plata)	August 14, 1987	Live event	Panama	1	290	0	Defeated El Baron, Celestial and El Tauru.	
5	Los Villanos (Villano I, Villano IV and Villano V)	May 30, 1988	Live event	Puebla, Mexico	1		3		
Championship history is unrecorded from May 30, 1988 to April 23, 1989.
6	El Triángulo de la Muerte (Kahoz, Rambo and Zandokan)	April 23, 1989	Live event	Mexico City	1	119	0	Defeated Los Brazos.	
7	Los Brazos (El Brazo, Brazo de Oro and Brazo de Plata)	August 20, 1989	Live event	N/A	2	210	0		
8	El Triángulo de la Muerte (Kahoz, Rambo and Zandokan)	March 18, 1990	Live event	Naucalpan, Mexico	2	88	0		
9	Los Villanos (Villano I, Villano IV and Villano V)	June 24, 1990	Live event	Naucalpan, Mexico	2	119	0		
10	Los Brazos (El Brazo, Brazo de Oro and Brazo de Plata)	October 21, 1990	Live event	Naucalpan, Mexico	3	72	0		
11	Los Villanos (Villano I, Villano IV and Villano V)	January 1, 1991	Live event	Naucalpan, Mexico	3	96	2		
12	The Hawaiian Beasts (Fatu, Great Kokina and The Samoan Savage)	April 7, 1991	Live event	Naucalpan, Mexico	1	54	0		
13	Los Villanos (Villano I, Villano IV and Villano V)	May 31, 1991	Live event	Naucalpan, Mexico	4	275	6		
14	Los Misioneros de la Muerte (Black Power II, Negro Navarro and El Signo)	March 1, 1992	Live event	Naucalpan, Mexico	1 (1, 3, 3)	455	6		
15	El Engendro, Shu El Guerrero and Scorpio Jr.	May 30, 1993	Live event	Naucalpan, Mexico	1	209	3		
16	Los Misioneros de la Muerte (El Texano, Negro Navarro and El Signo)	December 21, 1993	Live event	Nezahualcóyotl, Mexico	3 (1, 4, 4)	160	1		
17	El Engendro, Shu El Guerrero and Scorpio Jr.	May 30, 1994	Live event	Puebla, Mexico	2	7	0		
18	Los Misioneros de la Muerte (Negro Navarro, Rocky Santana and El Signo)	June 6, 1994	Live event	Puebla, Mexico	1 (5, 1, 5)	118	0		
19	Shu El Guerrero, Scorpio Jr. and Villano V	October 2, 1994	Live event	Naucalpan, Mexico	1 (3, 3, 5)	7	0		
†	Los Misioneros de la Muerte (Negro Navarro, Rocky Santana and El Signo)	October 9, 1994	Live event	Naucalpan, Mexico	—	22	0		
†	Karloff Lagarde Jr., Perro Silva and Principe Maya	October 31, 1994	Live event	Tulancingo, Mexico	—		0		
—	Deactivated	November 1995	—	—	—	—	—	Championship abandoned when UWA closed	
Toryumon Japan
20	Crazy-Max (Cima, Suwa and Big Fuji)	May 18, 2001	Live event	Mexico City	1	51	2	Defeated Apolo Dantés, Valentin Mayo and Negro Navarro after the title was revived by Toryumon Japan.	
21	M2K (Darkness Dragon, Yasushi Kanda and Susumu Mochizuki)	July 8, 2001	Verano Peligroso	Tokyo, Japan	1	11	0		
22	Crazy-Max (Cima, Suwa and Big Fuji)	July 19, 2001	Verano Peligroso	Kagoshima, Japan	2	26	0		
23	Magnum Tokyo, Dragon Kid and Ryo Saito	August 14, 2001	Verano Peligroso II	Tokyo, Japan	1	75	2	This was a three-way match also involving Masaaki Mochizuki, Yasushi Kanda and Darkness Dragon.	
24	M2K (Darkness Dragon, Masaaki Mochizuki and Susumu Mochizuki)	October 28, 2001	La Gran Pelea: Sayonara Saito Series	Tokyo, Japan	1 (2, 1, 2)	72	0		
25	Crazy-Max (Cima, Big Fuji and Taru)	January 8, 2002	Feliz and Nuevo	Tokyo, Japan	3 (3, 3, 1)	243	4		
26	Italian Connection (Milano Collection A.T., Yossino and "brother" Yassini)	September 8, 2002	Absoltamente	Tokyo, Japan	1	80	0		
27	Crazy-Max (Cima, Suwa and Big Fuji)	November 27, 2002	Battalla de Otono II	Tokyo, Japan	4 (4, 3, 4)	170	2		
28	Do Fixer (Genki Horiguchi, Ryo Saito and Susumu Yokosuka)	May 16, 2003	Premium Live Match vol. 40	Kobe, Japan	1 (1, 2, 3)	44	0		
29	Shin M2K (Kenichiro Arai, Dragon Kid and Masaaki Mochizuki)	June 29, 2003	IVrt Aniversario	Kobe, Japan	1 (1, 2, 3)	62	2		
30	Italian Connection (Milano Collection A.T., Condotti Shuji and Yossino)	August 30, 2003	Verano Peligroso II	Tokyo, Japan	1 (2, 1, 2)	(Note: The exact date the championship was vacated has not been confirmed, putting their title reign at between 1 day and 21 days.)	0	Defeated Shin M2K (Kenichiro Arai, Dragon Kid and Masaaki Mochizuki), Crazy-Max (Cima, Suwa and Don Fujii) and Do Fixer (Genki Horiguchi, Magnum Tokyo and Susumu Yokosuka) in a four-way elimination match.	
—	Vacated	September 2003	—	—	—	—	—	Championship vacated when the team split up.	
31	Hagure Gundam/Aagan Iisou (Toru Owashi, Condotti Shuji and Yassini)	September 20, 2003	Live event	Kyoto, Japan	1 (1, 2, 2)	232	3	Defeated Milano Collection A.T., Anthony W. Mori and Yossino.	
32	Kenichiro Arai, Dragon Kid and Second Doi	May 9, 2004	Live event	Shimonoseki, Japan	1 (2, 3, 1)	28	2		
—	Vacated	June 6, 2004	—	—	—	—	—	Championship vacated after a match against Milano Collection A.T., Anthony W. Mori and Yossino ended in a no contest	
—	Deactivated	2004	—	—	—	—	—	Último Dragón left Toryumon and took the promotion's name with him; successor promotion Dragon Gate establishes the Open the Triangle Gate Championship as a successor.	
33	Gedo, Jado and Katsushi Takemura	September 9, 2004	Toryumon X Final	Tokyo, Japan	1	(Note: The exact date the championship was vacated has not been confirmed, the length of the reign is too uncertain to calculate.)	0	Defeated Taiji Ishimori, Shu and Kei Sato	
—	Vacated	N/A	—	—	—	—	—	Championship vacated for undocumented reasons	
34	Los Salseros Japoneses (Takayasu Fukuda, Pineapple Hanai and Takeshi Minamino)	May 14, 2005	Toryumon Mexico 8th Anniversary	Mexico City	1	385	0	Defeated Solar I, Ultraman and Ultraman Jr.	
†	Maguro Ooma, Shu Sato and Kei Sato	June 3, 2006	Michinoku Pro Live event	Tokyo, Japan	—		N/A		
—	Vacated	N/A	—	—	—	—	—	Championship vacated for undocumented reasons.	
Pro-Wrestling El Dorado
35	Hell's Demons (Takuya Sugawara, Brahman Shu and Brahman Kei)	August 9, 2007	Perfect Treasure	Tokyo, Japan	1	142	2	Defeated Kagetora, Hercules Oosenga and Toru Owashi.	
—	Vacated	December 29, 2007	—	—	—	—	—	Championship vacated after the team split up at I Was Born to Love Treasure.	
36	Nobutaka Araya, Toru Owashi and Takuya Sugawara	February 27, 2008	Game of Treasure	Tokyo, Japan	1 (1, 2, 2)	209	0	Defeated Hell's Demons (Brahman Kei, Brahman Shu and Go).	
37	The Italian Four Horsemen (Francesco Togo, Piza Michinoku and Antonio Honda)	December 29, 2008	Live event	Tokyo, Japan	1	335	3	Defeated Men's Teioh, Danshoku Dino and Yuhi Sato in a tournament final.	
DDT Pro-Wrestling (DDT)
38	Belt Hunter×Hunter (Danshoku Dino, Hikaru Sato and Masa Takanashi)	November 29, 2009	Live event	Tokyo, Japan	1	56	0	Defeated Antonio Honda, Francesco Togo and Piza Michinoku; DDT assumes control of the championship.	
39	Tokyo Gurentai (Fujita, Mazada and Nosawa Rongai)	January 24, 2010	Live event	Tokyo, Japan	1	105	1		
40	Atsushi Kotoge, Daisuke Harada and Takoyakida	May 9, 2010	Live event	Tokyo, Japan	1	28	1		
41	Ebessan (III), Kanjyuro Matsuyama and Kuishinbo Kamen	June 6, 2010	Live event	Osaka, Japan	1	6	0		
42	Tokyo Gurentai (Fujita, Mazada and Nosawa Rongai)	June 12, 2010	Live event	Osaka, Japan	2	1	0		
43	Hikaru Sato, Keisuke Ishii and Yoshihiko	June 13, 2010	Live event	Tokyo, Japan	1 (2, 1, 1)	42	0		
44	Great Kojika, Mr. #6 and Riho	July 25, 2010	Ryōgoku Peter Pan 2010	Tokyo, Japan	1	101	0	This was a three-way match also involving the team of Kudo, Yasu Urano and Antonio Honda. This match was also for the Jiyūgaoka 6-Person Tag Team Championship and the Sea Of Japan 6-Person Tag Team Championship.	
45	Shit Heart♥Foundation (Hikaru Sato, Michael Nakazawa and Tomomitsu Matsunaga)	November 3, 2010	Live event	Tokyo, Japan	1 (3, 1, 1)	53	0		
46	Disaster Box (Harashima, Toru Owashi and Yukihiro Abe)	December 26, 2010	Live event	Tokyo, Japan	1 (1, 3, 1)		0		
—	Vacated	N/A	—	—	—	—	—		
Wrestle-1 (W-1)
47	Jackets (Jiro Kuroshio, Seiki Yoshioka and Yasufumi Nakanoue)	October 9, 2015	Fan Appreciation Day	Tokyo, Japan	1	25	0	Defeated new Wild order (Akira, Jun Kasai and Kumagoro), after the title was revived by Wrestle-1.	
48	Real Desperado (Kazma Sakamoto, Koji Doi and Nosawa Rongai)	November 3, 2015	Autumn Bout	Nagoya, Japan	1 (1, 1, 3)	24	0		
49	Jackets (Jiro Kuroshio, Seiki Yoshioka and Yasufumi Nakanoue)	November 27, 2015	Autumn Bout	Tokyo, Japan	2	41	0		
—	Vacated	January 7, 2016	—	—	—	—	—	Title vacated due to Yoshioka being sidelined following cecum surgery and being unable to attend a title defense set for January 10, 2016.	
50	Kaz Hayashi, Minoru Tanaka and Tajiri	January 31, 2016	Sunrise	Tokyo, Japan	1	180	4	Defeated Jackets (Jiro Kuroshio, Seiki Yoshioka and Yasufumi Nakanoue) to win the vacant title.	
51	Andy Wu, Daiki Inaba and Seiki Yoshioka	July 29, 2016	Symbol	Tokyo, Japan	1 (1, 1, 3)	133	3		
52	Jun Kasai, Nosawa Rongai and Shuji Kondo	December 9, 2016	Shining Winter	Tokyo, Japan	1 (1, 4, 3)	75	0		
53	New Era (Daiki Inaba, Kohei Fujimura and Yusuke Kodama)	February 22, 2017	W-Impact	Tokyo, Japan	1 (2, 1, 1)	46	1		
54	Kaz Hayashi, Masayuki Kono and Shuji Kondo	April 9, 2017	Cherry Blossom	Sapporo, Japan	1 (2, 1, 4)	7	0		
55	New Era (Andy Wu, Koji Doi and Kumagoro)	April 16, 2017	The Golden Battle in Kobe FOP	Kobe, Japan	1 (2, 2, 1)	20	0		
56	Kaz Hayashi, Manabu Soya and Shuji Kondo	May 6, 2017	Triumph	Gifu, Japan	1 (3, 1, 5)	29	1		
57	Jay Freddie, Jiro Kuroshio and Kumagoro	June 4, 2017	Outbreak	Kimitsu, Japan	1 (1, 3, 2)	14	0		
58	Ganseki Tanaka, Manabu Soya and Nosawa Rongai	June 18, 2017	Outbreak	Shimizu, Japan	1 (1, 2, 5)	92	2		
59	New Era (Jiro Kuroshio, Koji Doi and Kumagoro)	September 18, 2017	Wrestle-1 4th Anniversary	Tokyo, Japan	1 (4, 3, 3)	33	0		
60	Enfants Terribles (Seigo Tachibana, Shotaro Ashino and Yusuke Kodama)	October 21, 2017	Updraft	Tsuchiura, Japan	1 (1, 1, 2)	42	2		
61	New Era (Koji Doi, Kumagoro and Takanori Ito)	December 2, 2017	Shining Winter	Yokohama, Japan	1 (4, 4, 1)	102	4		
62	Tokyo Gurentai (Fujita, Mazada and Nosawa Rongai)	March 14, 2018	Trans Magic	Tokyo, Japan	3 (1, 1, 6)	359	2	Left Wrestle-1 while champions.	
—	Vacated	March 8, 2019	—	—	—	—	—	Title vacated due to a "lack of defenses".	
Big Japan Pro Wrestling (BJW)
63	Sento Minzoku (Daiki Shimomura, Isami Kodaka and Ryuichi Sekine)	July 21, 2019	Osaka Surprise 42: Strong World 2019	Osaka, Japan	1	55	2	Defeated Banana Senga, Tsutomu Oosugi and Yuki Ishikawa when titles are revived by Big Japan Pro Wrestling.	
(DDT) DDT Pro-Wrestling: Pro-Wrestling Basara
64	Takato Nakano, Takumi Tsukamoto and Yasu Urano	September 14, 2019	Basara 105: The 2nd Fox Prince	Tokyo, Japan	1	105	4		
65	Sparky (Ryota Nakatsu, Naoki Tanizaki and Akiyori Takizawa)	December 28, 2019	Basara 115: All Things In Nature	Tokyo, Japan	1	58	1		
Big Japan Pro Wrestling (BJW)
66	Viva México Cabrones (Billyken Kid, Masamune, and Tsubasa)	February 24, 2020	Osaka Surprise 48: Sennen no Wadachi	Osaka, Japan	1	496	4		
67	Andy Wu, Hub and Ultimate Spider Jr.	July 4, 2021	Osaka Surprise 52: Proud Ruler 2021	Osaka, Japan	1 (3, 1, 1)	36	0		
68	Sento Minzoku (Isami Kodaka, Minoru Fujita and Daiki Shimomura)	August 9, 2021	Osaka Surprise 53: Zero Gravity 2021	Osaka, Japan	1 (2, 4, 2)	63	0		
—	Vacated	October 11, 2021	—	—	—	—	—		
Pro-Wrestling Basara
69	Aagan Iisou (Shuji Kondo, Takuya Sugawara and Toru Owashi)	October 24, 2021	Basara 173: Futō Fukutsu	Tokyo, Japan	1 (6, 3, 4)	1,791+	0	Defeated Sento Minzoku (Isami Kodaka, Minoru Fujita and Daiki Shimomura) to win the vacant titles.	

== Combined reigns ==
As of September 19, 2026.

=== By wrestler ===
†	Indicates the current champion
¤	The exact length of at least one title reign is uncertain, so the shortest possible length is used.

Rank	Wrestler	No. of reigns	Combined days
1	Toru Owashi †	4	¤2,232+
2	Takuya Sugawara †	3	2,142+
3	Shuji Kondo †	6	2,133+
4	El Signo	5	841¤
4	Negro Navarro	6	841¤
6	Nosawa Rongai	6	655
7	Black Power II	2	611
8	El Brazo	3	572¤
8	Brazo de Oro	3	572¤
8	Brazo de Plata	3	572¤
11	Minoru Fujita/Fujita	4	528
12	Villano I	5	500¤
12	Villano IV	5	500¤
12	Villano V	5	500¤
15	Billyken Kid	1	496
15	Masamune	1	496
15	Tsubasa	1	496
18	Cima	4	490
18	Big Fujii	4	490
20	Masada	3	465
21	Mango Fukuda	1	385
21	Pineapple Hanai	1	385
21	Takeshi Minamino	1	385
24	Francesco Togo	1	335
24	Piza Michinoku	1	335
24	Antonio Honda	1	335
27	Yassini/"brother" Yasshi	2	312
28	Suwa	3	247
29	Taru	1	243
30	Seiki Yoshioka	3	223
30	Scorpio Jr.	3	223
30	Shu El Guerrero	3	223
33	Kaz Hayashi	3	216
34	El Engendro	2	216
35	Nobutaka Araya	1	209
36	Kahoz	2	197
36	Rambo	2	197
36	Zandokan	2	197
39	Dragon Kid	3	194
40	Andy Wu	3	189
41	Minoru Tanaka	1	180
41	Tajiri	1	180
43	Koji Doi	4	179
43	Daiki Inaba	2	179
45	Kumagoro	4	169
46	Hikaru Sato	3	151
47	Brahman Kei	1	142
47	Brahman Shu	1	142
49	Jiro Kuroshio	4	137
50	Masaaki Mochizuki	3	134
51	Susumu Yokosuka	3	127
52	Manabu Soya	2	121
55	Kenichiro Arai	2	119
55	Ryo Saito	2	119
53	Daiki Shimomura	2	118
53	Isami Kodaka	2	118
53	Rocky Santana	1	118
58	Takato Nakano	1	105
58	Takumi Tsukamoto	1	105
58	Yasu Urano	1	105
61	Takanori Ito	1	102
62	Great Kojika	1	101
62	Riho	1	101
62	Mr. #6	1	101
65	Ganseki Tanaka	1	92
66	Yusuke Kodama	2	88
67	Darkness Dragon	2	83
68	Milano Collection A.T.	2	80¤
68	Yossino	2	80¤
70	Jun Kasai	1	75
70	Magnum Tokyo	1	75
72	Yasufumi Nakanoue	2	66
73	Akiyori Takizawa	1	58
73	Naoki Tanizaki	1	58
73	Ryota Nakatsu	1	58
76	Danshoku Dino	1	56
76	Masa Takanashi	1	56
78	Ryuichi Sekine	1	55
79	Fatu	1	54
79	Great Kokina	1	54
79	The Samoan Savage	1	54
82	Michael Nakazawa	1	53
82	Tomomitsu Matsunaga	1	53
84	Kohei Fujimura	1	46
84	Yusuke Kodama	1	46
86	Genki Horiguchi	1	44
87	Shotaro Ashino	1	42
87	Seigo Tachibana	1	42
87	Keisuke Ishii	1	42
87	Yoshihiko	1	42
91	Hub	1	36
91	Ultimate Spider Jr.	1	36
93	Atsushi Kotoge	1	28
93	Daisuke Harada	1	28
93	Second Doi	1	28
93	Takoyakida	1	28
97	Jay Freddie	1	14
98	Yasushi Kanda	1	11
99	Masayuki Kono	1	7
100	Ebessan (III)	1	6
100	Kanjyuro Matsuyama	1	6
100	Kuishinbo Kamen	1	6
103	Black Man	1	
103	Gedo	1	
103	Harashima	1	
103	Jado	1	
103	Katsushi Takemura	1	
103	Kato Kung Lee	1	
103	Kung Fu	1	
103	Yukihiro Abe	1	
