= Riho =

Japanese professional wrestler

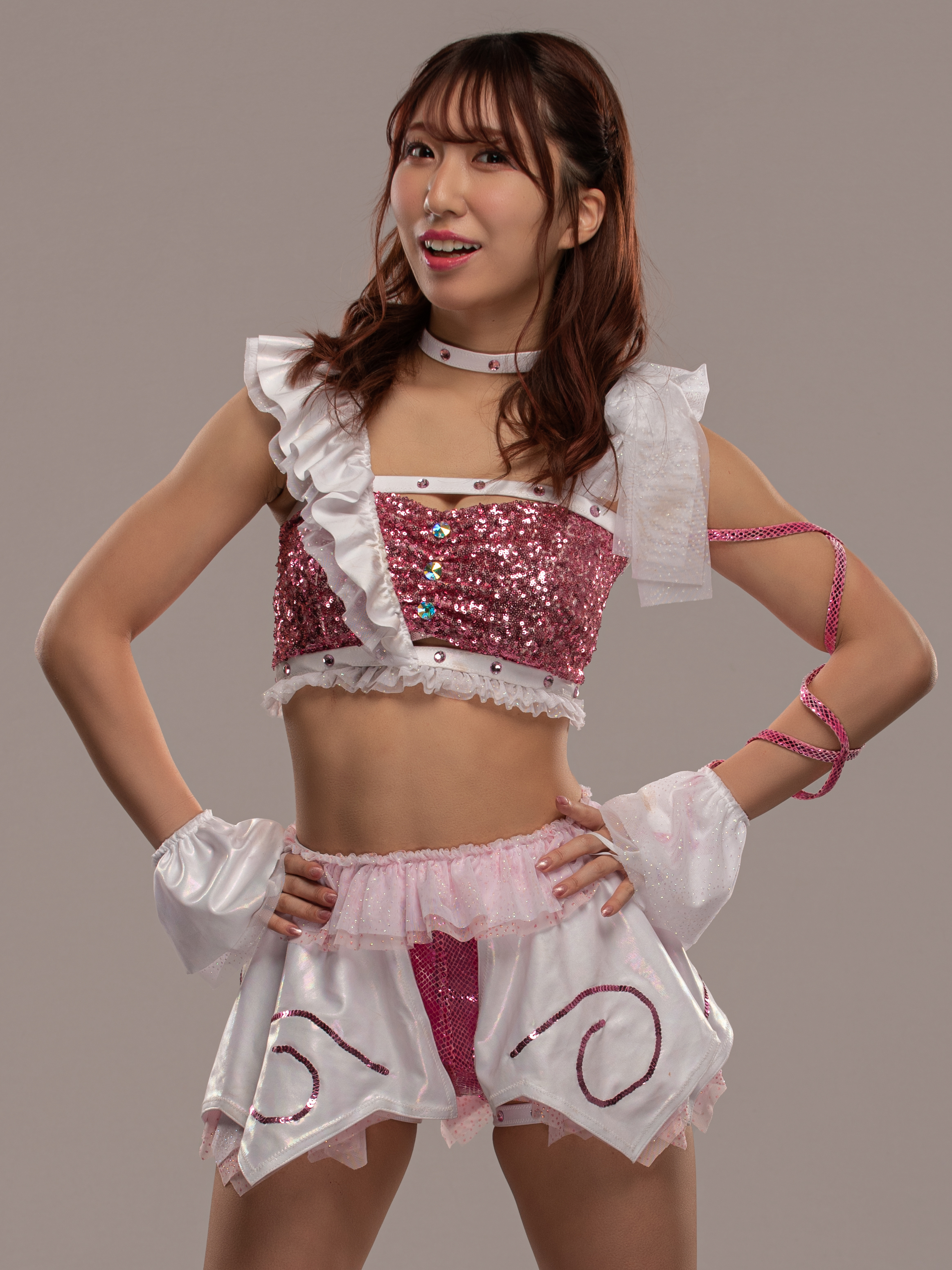
- Riho in February 2021

Personal information
- Born: June 4, 1997 (age 29) Tokyo, Japan

Professional wrestling career
- Ring name(s): Black Cherry (#1); Lee Ho; Riho; Riho-hime
- Billed height: 1.55 m (5 ft 1 in)
- Billed weight: 45 kg (99 lb)
- Billed from: Shinagawa City, Japan
- Trained by: Emi Sakura
- Debut: May 01, 2005

Riho (里歩, Riho; born June 4, 1997) is a Japanese professional wrestler. She is signed to All Elite Wrestling (AEW), where she is a former and the inaugural AEW Women's World Champion.

Riho was trained by Emi Sakura and debuted for Ice Ribbon in 2006 at the age of eight. She worked for the promotion for the next six years and became its first Triple Crown Champion after winning the ICE×60 Championship, the International Ribbon Tag Team Championship, and the Triangle Ribbon Championship once each. As part of a trio with The Great Kojika and Mr. #6, she became a Jiyūgaoka 6-Person Tag Team Champion, Sea of Japan 6-Person Tag Team Champion, and UWA World Trios Champion, unifying the three championships in 2010. She left Ice Ribbon in 2012 to join Gatoh Move Pro Wrestling and won the IWA Triple Crown Championship in 2014.

Riho began making appearances for AEW in 2019. She became the inaugural AEW Women's World Champion, which she held for 133 days. She also began appearing in World Wonder Ring Stardom, where she won the High Speed Championship in her first match and held it for 351 days.

== Early life ==
Riho was born in the Shinagawa ward of Tokyo on June 4, 1997. She has an older sister named Seina.

== Professional wrestling career ==
=== Ice Ribbon (2006–2012) ===
In 2006, when Riho was nine years old, she and her older sister Seina began training in professional wrestling under Emi Sakura at her Ice Ribbon dojo. She made her debut in an exhibition match against Nanae Takahashi in her native Shinagawa on May 29, 2006. On July 25, she made her debut for Ice Ribbon at the promotion's third event, defeating Makoto. Riho's first year in professional wrestling consisted mainly of matches with her Seina, Sakura, and Hikari Minami. In March 2008, Riho and Seina faced each other in a four-match series, which Riho won 3–1.

On October 24, 2008, Riho won her first professional wrestling championship, when she teamed with Yuki Sato to defeat Chounko and Masako Takanashi for the International Ribbon Tag Team Championship. On December 23, Riho was entered into a tournament to determine the inaugural ICE×60 Champion but was eliminated in the semifinals by Seina, who would go on to become the champion. After successfully defending the International Ribbon Tag Team Championship against Emi Sakura and Ribbon Takanashi, Riho and Sato vacated the title, after Riho fractured her right leg on March 31, 2009. For most of 2009, Riho was involved in a storyline rivalry with Chii Tomiya, which eventually led to the two forming the tag team Miniature Dachs in November. On November 28, 2009, Riho defeated Nanae Takahashi and Tsukasa Fujimoto to become the inaugural Triangle Ribbon Champion. After one successful title defense, Riho lost the title to Miyako Matsumoto on March 22, 2010. However, just twelve days later, Riho came back to defeat Matsumoto for the ICE×60 Championship, the promotion's top title. In the process, Riho also became Ice Ribbon's first Triple Crown Champion. During the post-match celebration, Riho nominated her trainer Emi Sakura as her first challenger for the belt. On May 3 at Golden Ribbon, Riho became the youngest person to ever main event a show in Korakuen Hall, when she lost the ICE×60 Championship to Sakura in her first defense, ending her title reign at just 30 days.

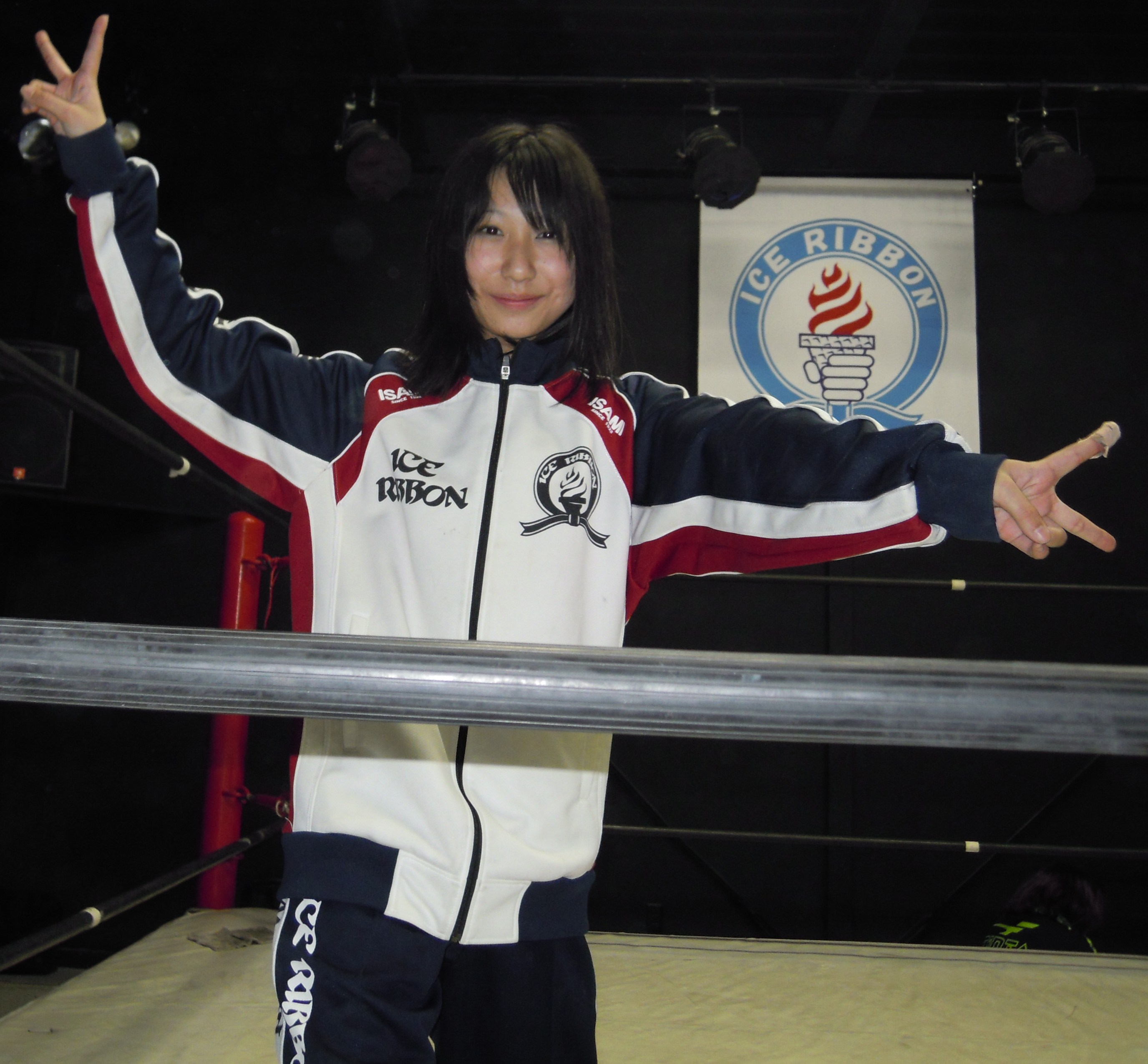
Riho in February 2010

In January 2011, Riho came together with Ice Ribbon's younger wrestlers, including former associates Chii Tomiya and Hikari Minami, to form the Heisei YTR (Young Traditional Revolution) stable, under the leadership of Makoto. On February 6, Riho and Makoto made it to the finals of the Ike! Ike! Ima, Ike! Ribbon Tag Tournament, before being defeated by Muscle Venus (Hikaru Shida and Tsukasa Fujimoto) in a match that was also contested for the International Ribbon Tag Team Championship. On March 31, Riho made her debut for Smash at Smash.15, where she teamed with Hikari Minami and Tsukushi to defeat Emi Sakura, Makoto and Mochi Miyagi in a six-woman tag team match, scoring the deciding pinfall over Miyagi. The following month, Riho and Minami began producing their own events under the banner of "Teens", which would focus on spotlighting Ice Ribbon's younger wrestlers. In August, the alliance between Riho and Makoto was broken, when Makoto announced that she would be leaving Ice Ribbon for Smash. On August 11, Riho interrupted a Smash press conference, where the transfer was made official, by attacking Smash promoter Tajiri and challenging him to a match. The match took place on August 21, during Makoto's final night in Ice Ribbon, and saw Tajiri pick up the win. On December 25 at RibbonMania 2011, Seina returned to Ice Ribbon, after a two-year hiatus, to wrestle her retirement match against her Riho. Riho won the match in eight minutes and afterwards refereed a three-minute match, where Seina was defeated by her longtime friend Hikari Minami.

In early 2012, Riho began teaming regularly with Hikari Minami, after the latter brought back the Teens concept, producing Teens4 on March 3. On April 15 at Teens5, Riho won a tournament to earn the right to book herself a match for Teens6. On May 24, Riho made her debut for Wrestling New Classic (WNC), the follow-up promotion to Smash, when she replaced an injured Mio Shirai in a tag team match, where she and Makoto were defeated by Kana and Syuri. On June 16 at Teens6, Riho was defeated by World Wonder Ring Stardom representative Nanae Takahashi in the match she was allowed to choose herself. On September 1, Riho announced that she was quitting Ice Ribbon after the September 23 Korakuen Hall event to reunite with Emi Sakura, who had left the promotion in the beginning of the year. On September 17, Riho wrestled her final match at the Ice Ribbon Dojo in Saitama, teaming with her hand-picked partner Tsukasa Fujimoto in a tag team match, where they defeated Hiroyo Matsumoto and Hamuko Hoshi, with Riho pinning Hoshi for the win. On September 23 at Ribbon no Kishitachi 2012, Riho was defeated by Aoi Kizuki in her Ice Ribbon farewell match.

=== DDT Pro-Wrestling (2010) ===
In June 2010, Riho began making appearances for DDT Pro-Wrestling (DDT). On June 13, she teamed with Kenny Omega and Mr. #6 to defeat Mr. Strawberry, Muscle Sakai and O.K. Revolution for the Sea Of Japan 6-Person Tag Team Championship. On July 20, Omega left the championship team, after which the title was declared vacant, before Riho, Mr. #6 and The Great Kojika were announced as the new champions on July 24. The following day, Riho, The Great Kojika and Mr. #6 defeated Hikaru Sato, Keisuke Ishii and Yoshihiko, and Antonio Honda, Kudo and Yasu Urano in a three-way match to retain the Sea Of Japan 6-Person Tag Team Championship and win the Jiyūgaoka 6-Person Tag Team Championship and UWA World Trios Championships, unifying the three titles in the process. After defending the Trios Triple Crown Championship against Jaki Numazawa, Jun Kasai and Miyako Matsumoto at an Ice Ribbon event on September 23, Riho, The Great Kojika and Mr. #6 lost the title to Hikaru Sato, Michael Nakazawa and Tomomitsu Matsunaga back in DDT on November 3.

=== Union Pro Wrestling (2010–2011) ===
In late 2010 and early 2011, Riho also made appearances for Union Pro Wrestling, where she performed under a mask for the character of Black Cherry, a storyline nemesis of Cherry. The storyline also came to include Black Cherry #2 and Black Cherry #3, portrayed by Ice Ribbon wrestlers Hikari Minami and Emi Sakura, respectively.

=== Gatoh Move Pro Wrestling (2012–2019) ===
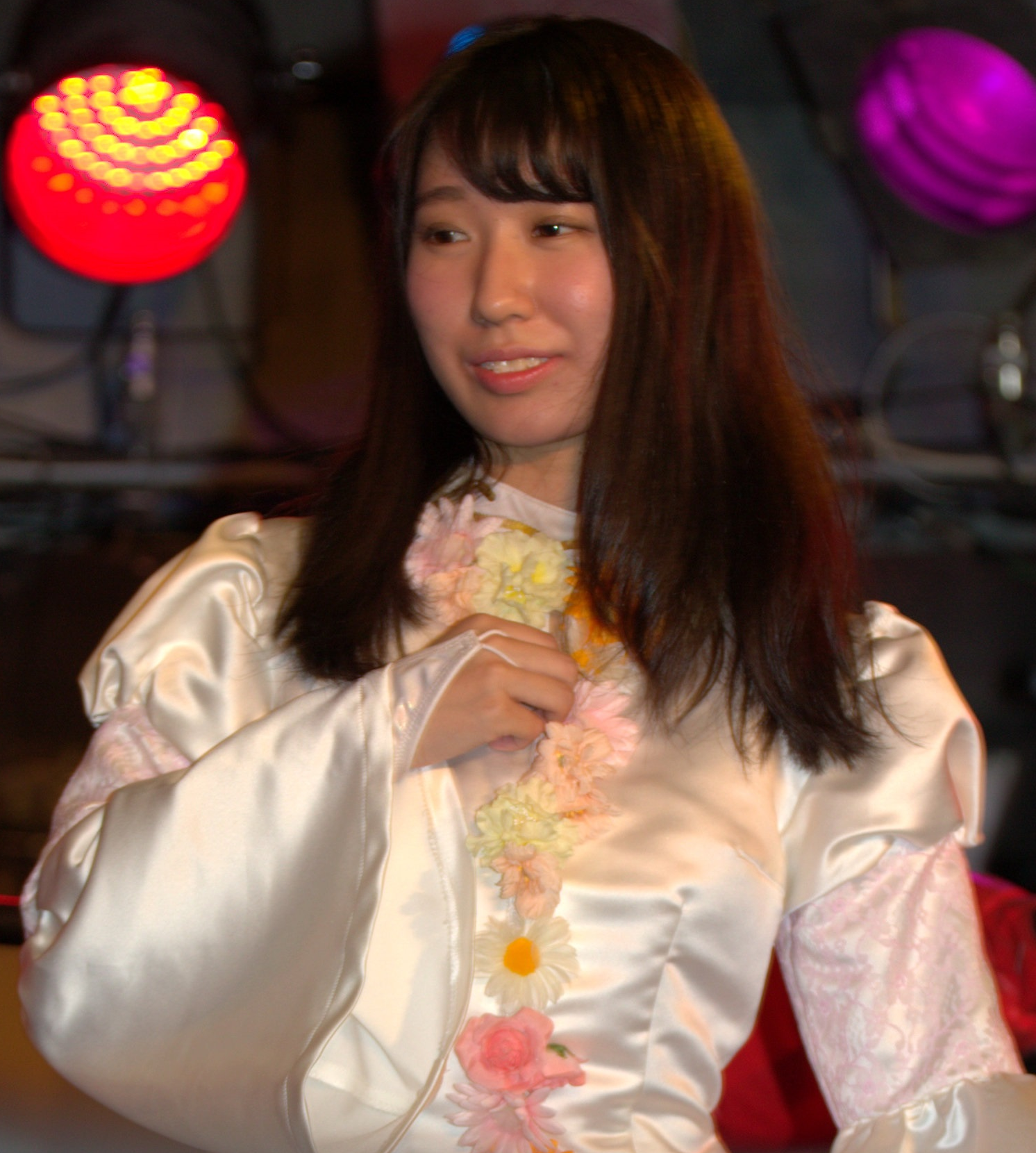
Riho in 2015

On September 23, 2012, Riho joined Emi Sakura's Bangkok-based promotion Gatoh Move Pro Wrestling. She made her in-ring debut for Gatoh Move on October 7 in Shinjuku, wrestling Emi Sakura to a ten-minute time limit draw. As part of her transfer to Gatoh Move, it was announced that Riho would be changing her ring name. On November 4, Riho changed her ring name from hiragana "りほ" to kanji "里歩", another way of writing her old ring name. She then went on to lose to Emi Sakura in a main event singles match. In January 2013, Riho took a temporary break from Gatoh Move to concentrate on her high school entrance exam. On May 4, Riho and Antonio Honda first defeated Choun Shiryu and Hiroyo Matsumoto in the semifinals and then Emi Sakura and Hikaru Sato in the finals to win the Go Go! Green Curry Khob Khun Cup mixed tag team tournament. From December 22 to 23, Riho and Emi Sakura worked two Wrestle-1 events, wrestling singles matches against each other; Riho won the first and Sakura the second. On August 9, 2014, Riho defeated Sakura in the finals to win the Gatonun Climax one-day tournament. On November 2, Riho defeated Sakura to win the IWA Triple Crown Championship, after which she announced she was entering the idol business. Riho made her first successful title defense on December 27, defeating Sakura in a rematch. Her second title defense took place on March 26, 2015, when she defeated Reina Joshi Puroresu's Makoto. On August 13, Riho main evented Gatoh Move's first ever Korakuen Hall show, successfully defending the IWA Triple Crown Championship against Kotori. On September 21, Riho lost the title to male wrestler DJ Nira in her fifth defense. On June 22, 2016, Gatoh Move held Riho's tenth anniversary event, which saw her defeat Kaori Yoneyama in the main event to regain the IWA Triple Crown Championship. She lost the title to Makoto on November 19. On December 24, Riho and Kotori defeated Aoi Kizuki and Sayaka Obihiro to win the Asia Dream Tag Team Championship. They lost the title to Emi Sakura and Masahiro Takanashi in their second defense on March 28, 2017. The following May, Riho took part in Pro-Wrestling: EVE events in the United Kingdom.

On September 22, 2017, Riho defeated Kotori in the finals of a tournament to become the inaugural Super Asia Champion. She made her first successful title defense on November 7 against Emi Sakura and afterwards announced she was going on an overseas tour. On March 31, 2018, she made her second successful defense of the Super Asia Championship vs Saki. Her third defense came against Jibzy in Bangkok, Thailand on May 12. Her next defense in Japan would be against Aoi Kizuki on July 28. A few weeks later she defended against Makoto in China, there was some controversy after the end of the match when Makoto complained that she kicked out before the count of three. On July 2, 2019, Riho was defeated by Emi Sakura in which after the match was over was given a farewell from Gatoh Move.

=== All Elite Wrestling (2019–present) ===
On May 25, 2019, Riho made her debut for All Elite Wrestling (AEW), competing in the six women tag-team match at Double or Nothing. On June 29 at Fyter Fest, she participated and won a three-way match. On August 31 at All Out, Riho defeated Hikaru Shida, advancing to face Nyla Rose on the October 2 episode of Dynamite to crown the inaugural AEW Women's World Champion. On October 2, she defeated Rose to become the inaugural champion. Riho made successful title defenses against Britt Baker on Dynamite, her mentor Emi Sakura at Full Gear, and in a four-way match against Baker, Shida and Rose on Dynamite. On the January 8, 2020, episode of Dynamite, she successfully defended the title in a match against Kris Statlander, due to interference from the Nightmare Collective (Awesome Kong, Brandi Rhodes, Dr. Luther and Mel) against Kris Statlander, which caused Baker, Big Swole and Shida to fend off against the stable. On the February 12 episode of Dynamite, Riho lost the AEW Women's World Championship to Rose, ending her reign at 133 days.

After an 11-month hiatus due to travel restrictions resulting from the COVID-19 pandemic, it was announced in January 2021 that Riho would be participating in the AEW Women's World Title Eliminator tournament. On the February 17 episode of Dynamite, Riho defeated NWA World Women's Champion Serena Deeb in the opening round in a non-title match. At the semi-finals of the American bracket, which aired on February 28 on B/R Live, Riho lost to Thunder Rosa. On the November 26 episode of Rampage, Riho faced Britt Baker (with the stipulation being that if Riho won, she would earn a title opportunity), and won the match.

On January 8, 2022, on AEW Battle of the Belts, Riho faced Baker for the AEW Women's World Championship which Riho lost by submission. On January 31, it was announced that Riho suffered a broken collarbone and returned to Japan. After nearly four months of inactivity due to injury, On the May 6 episode of Rampage, Riho participated in the AEW Owen Hart Cup and defeated Yuka Sakazaki in the qualifier match. On the following episode of Rampage, she was defeated by Ruby Soho in the quarterfinals. In 2023, Riho unsuccessfully challenged for the AEW Women's World Championship twice, once against Jamie Hayter on the April 5 episode of Dynamite and at Worlds End on December 30 against "Timeless" Toni Storm. In July 2024, she suffered an injury while wrestling Lady Frost.

After being out of action for 14 months, Riho made her return on Dynamite on September 3, 2025, saving Alex Windsor from an attack by AEW TBS Champion Mercedes Moné. At All Out on September 20, she unsuccessfully challenged Moné for the AEW TBS Championship.

=== World Wonder Ring Stardom (2019–2020) ===
On July 24, 2019, Riho made a surprise appearance on World Wonder Ring Stardom, announcing that she will wrestle for the company starting August. In her debut match on August 10, she won the High Speed Championship from Death Yama-san after pinning Starlight Kid in a three-way match. She successfully defended her title against Death Yama-san on September 29. From October 14 to November 4, she teamed with Starlight Kid to participate in the Goddesses Of Stardom Tag League 2019 as part of the Red Goddess block; they failed to advance to the finals but picked up a win over the Goddesses of Stardom Champions Jungle Kyona and Konami. On December 14, they unsuccessfully challenged the champions in a title match. Riho made her first appearance since February 16, 2020, on July 11 after the company went on hiatus due to the COVID-19 pandemic. She teamed with World of Stardom Champion Mayu Iwatani to defeat AZM and Momo Watanabe. On July 26, Riho lost the High Speed Championship to AZM, in a three-way match which also involved Starlight Kid. In late December, Dave Meltzer confirmed that Riho would no longer appear for the promotion due to AEW commitments.

== Championships and accomplishments ==
- All Elite Wrestling
  - AEW Women's World Championship (1 time, inaugural)
- DDT Pro-Wrestling
  - Jiyūgaoka 6-Person Tag Team Championship (1 time) – with The Great Kojika and Mr. #6
  - Sea Of Japan 6-Person Tag Team Championship (2 times) – with Kenny Omega and Mr. #6 (1), and The Great Kojika and Mr. #6 (1)
  - UWA World Trios Championship (1 time) – with The Great Kojika and Mr. #6
- Fuka Matsuri
  - Fuka Matsuri Rumble (2010)
- Gatoh Move Pro Wrestling
  - Asia Dream Tag Team Championship (2 times) – with Kotori (1) and Makoto (1)
  - IWA Triple Crown Championship (2 times)
  - Super Asia Championship (1 time)
  - Gatonun Climax (2014)
  - Go Go! Green Curry Khob Khun Cup (2013) – with Antonio Honda
  - Super Asia First Champion Determination Tournament (2017)
- Ice Ribbon
  - ICE×60 Championship (1 time)
  - International Ribbon Tag Team Championship (1 time) – with Yuki Sato
  - Triangle Ribbon Championship (1 time, inaugural)
  - Teens5 Tournament (2012)
  - First Triple Crown Champion
- Pro Wrestling Illustrated
  - Ranked No. 8 of the top 100 female wrestlers in the PWI Women's 100 in 2020
- Singapore Pro Wrestling
  - Queen of Asia Championship (1 time)
- World Wonder Ring Stardom
  - High Speed Championship (1 time)

New championship	1st AEW Women's World Champion; October 2, 2019 – February 12, 2020	Succeeded by Nyla Rose
