= Yoshihiro Sakai =

Japanese professional wrestler

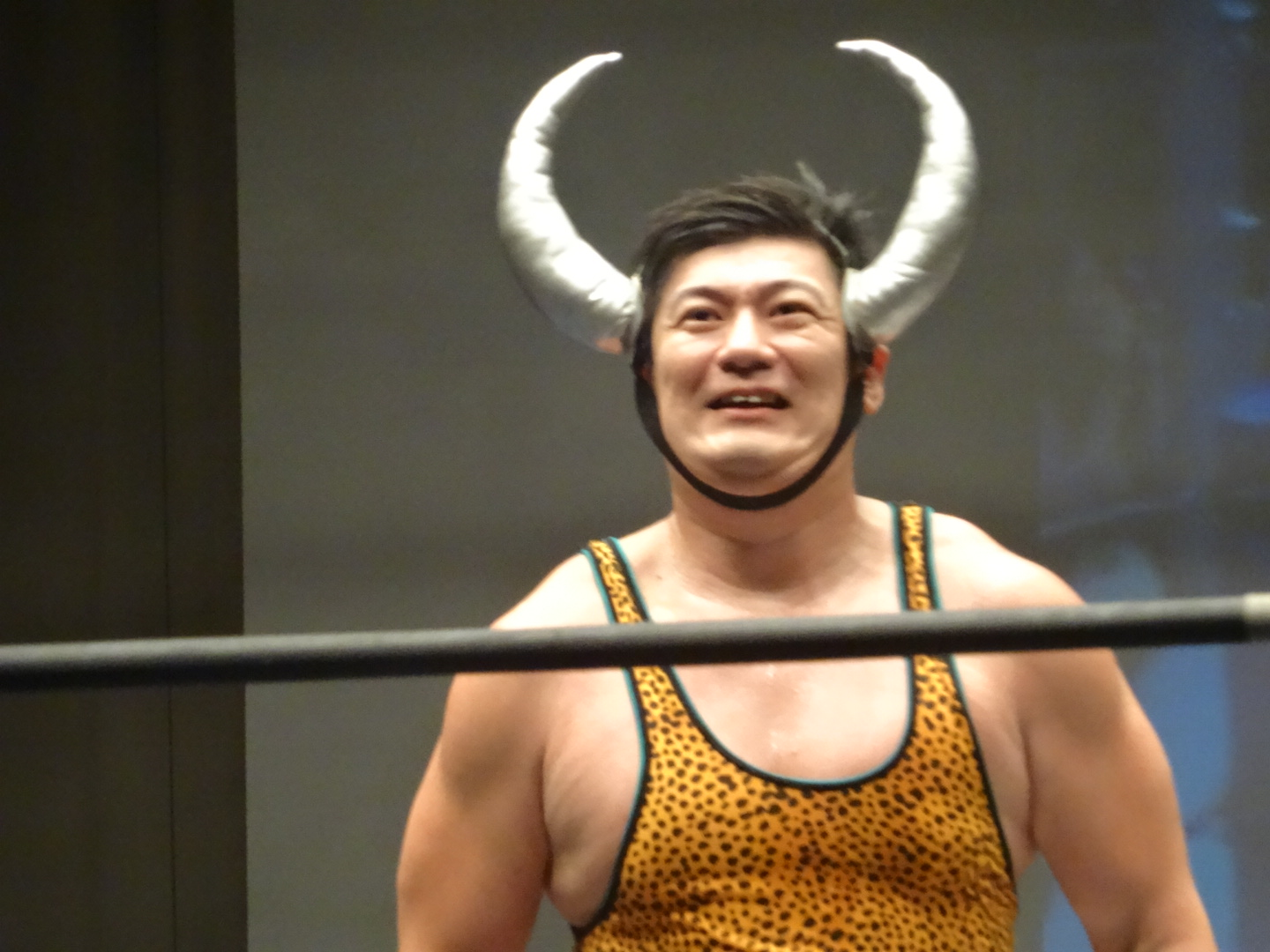
- Muscle Sakai in 2014

Personal information
- Born: November 5, 1977 (age 49) Niigata, Japan

Professional wrestling career
- Ring name(s): Yoshihiro Sakai; Muscle Sakai; Muscle Lesnar; Super Sasadango Machine
- Billed height: 1.86 m (6 ft 1 in)
- Billed weight: 120 kg (265 lb)
- Debut: 2002

Yoshihiro Sakai (坂井良宏, Sakai Yoshihiro; born November 5, 1977) is a Japanese professional wrestler, better known by his ring name Super Sasadango Machine (スーパー・ササダンゴ・マシン, Sūpā Sasadango Mashin) who works for the Japanese professional wrestling promotion DDT Pro-Wrestling (DDT).

== Professional wrestling career ==
=== Dramatic Dream Team/DDT Pro Wrestling (2002–present) ===
Sakai made his professional wrestling debut for Dramatic Dream Team (DDT) under his real name, Yoshihiro Sakai at a Non-Fix event on June 20, 2002, in a losing effort to Hero!.

Sakai was a part of Team Midbreath alongside Sanshiro Takagi (under the name Mr. Strawberry) and Ken Ohka who went under the nickname of O.K. Revolution, and together they were the inaugural Sea Of Japan 6-Person Tag Team Champions after defeating Super Uchuu Power, Tomohiko Hashimoto and Shuji Ishikawa in a tournament final which took place at the I Shall Return event on July 20, 2003. In 2004, while working under the name Muscle Sakai, he was the main protagonist and producer of the DDT sub-brand Muscle (マッスル, Massuru) which parodied the style of Hustle (ハッスル, Hassuru), a promotion created earlier that year and focused on the sports entertainment aspect of wrestling. Muscle went on to produce 26 shows between 2004 and 2012, a special event with Ken Ohka in 2015, a "Musclemania" event in 2019 and it was then revived as Hiragana Muscle (まっする, (Hiragana) Massuru) in 2020.

In 2012, he assumed a masked character by the name of Super Sasadango Machine (a parody of New Japan Pro Wrestling's Super Strong Machine).

During his tenure with DDT, he worked alongside various wrestlers and personalities such as Ken Ohka, Ladybeard, LiLiCo and Makoto Oishi with whom he won the KO-D 10-Man Tag Team Championship at Ryōgoku Peter Pan 2017 on August 20. During their reign, Keisuke Ishii replaced Ladybeard in several title defenses such as the one that occurred at God Bless DDT on November 23, 2017, where they fought Shiro Koshinaka, Sanshiro Takagi, Toru Owashi, Shigehiro Irie and Antonio Honda in a ten-man tag team match to retain the titles. On September 27, 2015, at Who's Gonna Top?, Sasadango teamed up with fellow #OhkaEmpire stable members Ken Ohka and Danshoku Dino to defeat Team Dream Futures (Keisuke Ishii, Shigehiro Irie and Soma Takao) for the KO-D 6-Man Tag Team Championship. At Ultimate Party 2019, Sakai teamed up with Jiro Kuroshio, Makoto Oishi, Hiroshi Yamato and Yuna Manase to battle Danshoku Dino, Asuka, Yuki Iino, Mizuki and Trans-Am★Hiroshi in a losing effort for the vacant KO-D 10-Man Tag Team Championship.

== Championships and accomplishments ==
- Dramatic Dream Team/DDT Pro-Wrestling
  - DDT Extreme Championship (3 times)
  - Ironman Heavymetalweight Championship (15 times)
  - Jiyūgaoka 6-Person Tag Team Championship (1 time) – with Harashima and Yusuke Inokuma
  - KO-D 6-Man Tag Team Championship (3 times) – with Danshoku Dino and Ken Ohka (1), Kenso and Danshoku Dino (1), and Shinya Aoki and Yuki Ueno (1)
  - KO-D 10-Man/8-Man Championship (2 times) – with Makoto Oishi, LiLiCo, Ken Ohka and Ladybeard (1) and Antonio Honda, Kazuki Hirata and Shinya Aoki (1)
  - Sea of Japan 6-Person Tag Team Championship (1 time) – with Mr. Strawberry and O.K. Revolution
- Union Pro-Wrestling
  - World Aipoke Championship (1 time)
