= Michael Nakazawa =

Japanese professional wrestler

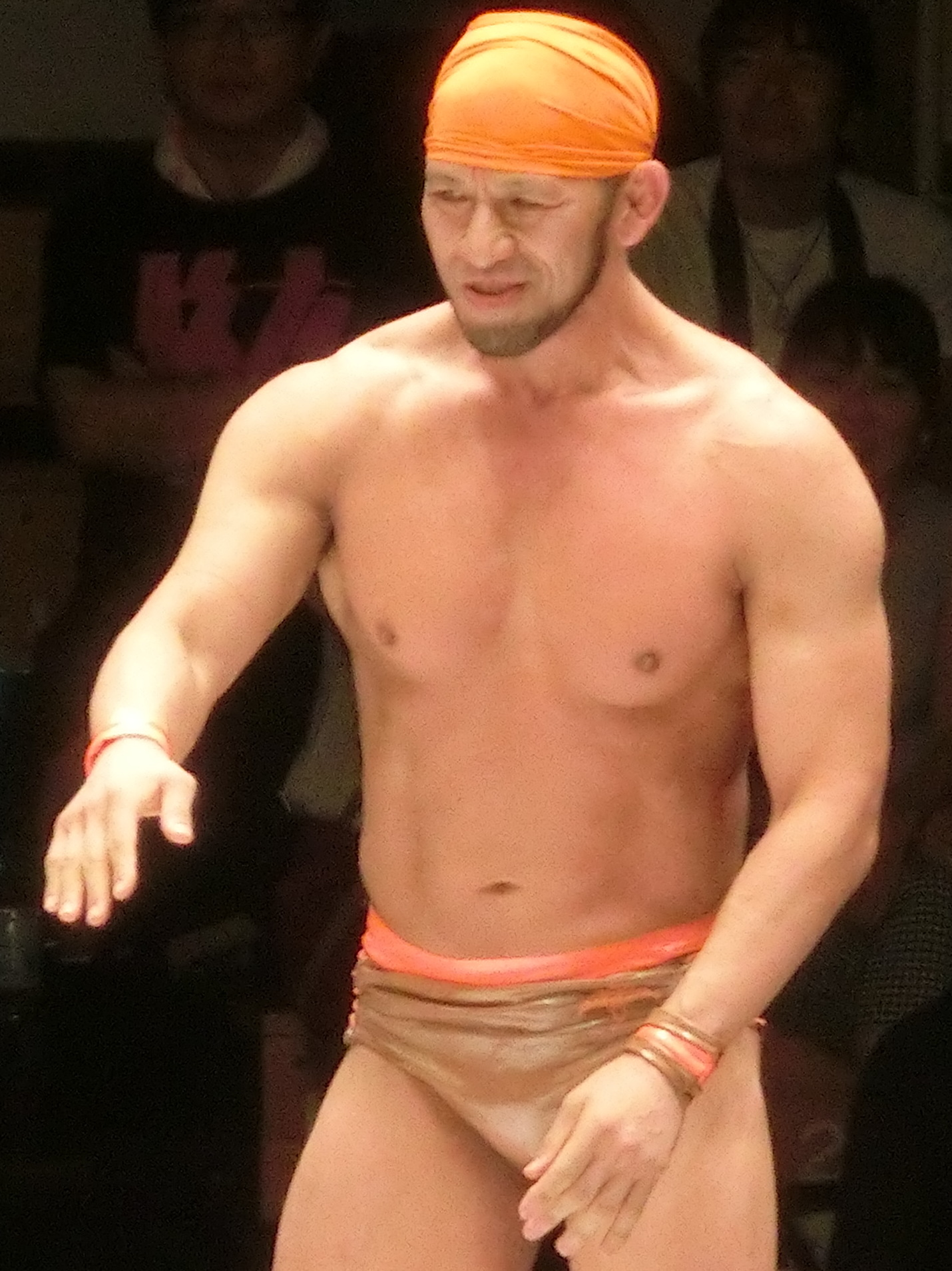
- Nakazawa in 2018

Personal information
- Born: Masatsugu Nakazawa; October 8, 1975 (age 51) Kawasaki, Kanagawa, Japan
- Education: Tokai University; United States Sports Academy

Professional wrestling career
- Ring names: Abnormal; Don Michael; Michael Nakajawa; Michael "CEO" Nakazawa; Michael Nakazawa; Michael Nakazawara; MT Nakazawa; Nakazawa Magic Iker
- Billed height: 5 ft 11 in (180 cm)
- Billed weight: 203 lb (92 kg)
- Trained by: DDT Dojo
- Debut: October 23, 2005

Masatsugu Nakazawa (中澤 公胤, Nakazawa Masatsugu; born October 8, 1975), better known by the ring name Michael Nakazawa (中澤マイケル, Nakazawa Maikeru), is a Japanese professional wrestler and judoka signed to All Elite Wrestling (AEW).

== Early life ==
Nakazawa attended Tokai University before studying abroad in the United States where he obtained an MSc Sports Science at the United States Sports Academy (USSA) Graduate School. Nakazawa's father, Kazunari Nakazawa, is an associate professor at Tokai University and director of the American football club.

== Professional wrestling career ==
=== Japanese promotions (2005–2019) ===
Nakazawa is best known for his tenure with DDT Pro-Wrestling where he is a former KO-D Tag Team Champion (with Kenny Omega), Jiyūgaoka 6-Person Tag Team Champion and DDT Extreme Champion. Throughout his career he has also wrestled for New Japan Pro-Wrestling, Michinoku Pro, Big Japan Pro Wrestling and All Japan Pro-Wrestling. Nakazawa studied in the United States and is a fluent speaker of English. He often acted as an interpreter for English-speaking foreign wrestlers in Japan and through this relationship he met Kenny Omega, a now-Executive VP at AEW, with whom he has shared a ring 35 times, both as an opponent and as a tag team partner.

=== All Elite Wrestling (2019–present) ===
Nakazawa was announced as a new signee of All Elite Wrestling (AEW) in early 2019. He debuted at Double Or Nothing, the promotion's inaugural event, taking part in a 21-man Casino Battle Royale. He was the first man to be eliminated by Sunny Daze. The following month at Fyter Fest, Nakazawa defeated Alex Jebailey in a hardcore match. On the November 13 episode of Dynamite, Nakazawa made his debut quickly losing to Jon Moxley. Following this, Nakazawa would mainly wrestle on AEW's secondary show Dark, facing the likes of Shawn Spears, Trent Beretta, Matt Sydal and Mike Sydal in losing efforts. On the January 20, 2021 episode of Dynamite, Nakazawa was seen in Kenny Omega's house welcoming in The Young Bucks thus establishing his affiliation with Omega in AEW. He Joined The Elite on February 17. On the March 10 episode of Dark: Elevation, Omega set up a match between Nakazawa and Matt Sydal where if Sydal won, he would receive an AEW World Title Eliminator match against Omega. During the match, Nakazawa displayed villainous tactics such as choking Sydal with his lanyard but he would eventually go on to lose the match.

== Championships and accomplishments ==
- DDT Pro-Wrestling
  - DDT Extreme Championship (1 time)
  - Ironman Heavymetalweight Championship (14 times)
  - Jiyūgaoka 6-Person Tag Team Championship (1 time) — with Hikaru Sato and Tomomitsu Matsunaga
  - KO-D Tag Team Championship (2 times) — with Tomomitsu Matsunaga (1) and Kenny Omega (1)
  - Sea Of Japan 6-Person Tag Team Championship (1 time) — with Hikaru Sato and Tomomitsu Matsunaga
  - UWA World Trios Championship (1 time) — with Hikaru Sato and Tomomitsu Matsunaga

== Luchas de Apuestas record ==
Winner (wager)	Loser (wager)	Location	Event	Date	Notes
Michael Nakazawa & Tomomitsu Matsunaga (hair)	Danshoku Dino & Rion Mizuki (hair)	Korakuen Hall	DDT Day Dream Believer 2007	October 21, 2007	
