= Kudo (wrestler) =

Japanese professional wrestler

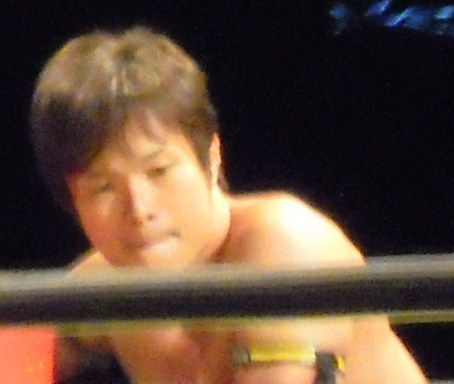
- Kudo in September 2010

Personal information
- Born: Atsushi Kudo Tokyo, Japan

Professional wrestling career
- Ring name(s): Daisuke Kiso; Dragon-Achooooo; Jacques de Atsushinu; Konica Man #2; Kudo; Toguro Habukage; Warsman
- Billed height: 1.77 m (5 ft 9 1/2 in)
- Billed weight: 80 kg (180 lb)
- Trained by: DDT Pro-Wrestling
- Debut: November 30, 2001

Atsushi Kudo (工藤 敦, Kudō Atsushi) is a Japanese professional wrestler, better known by the ring name Kudo (stylized in all capital letters). Signed to the DDT Pro-Wrestling promotion, he is a seven-time KO-D 6-Man Tag Team Champion, while also being a former four-time KO-D Openweight Champion, four-time KO-D Tag Team Champion and the winner of the 2005 and 2011 King of DDT Tournaments. Kudo has also made several trips to the United States, working for various independent promotions including Chikara, Independent Wrestling Association Mid-South (IWA-MS), International Wrestling Cartel (IWC), IWA East Coast and NWA Upstate. He is currently inactive but not officially retired.

== Professional wrestling career ==
=== Dramatic Dream Team (2001–2005) ===
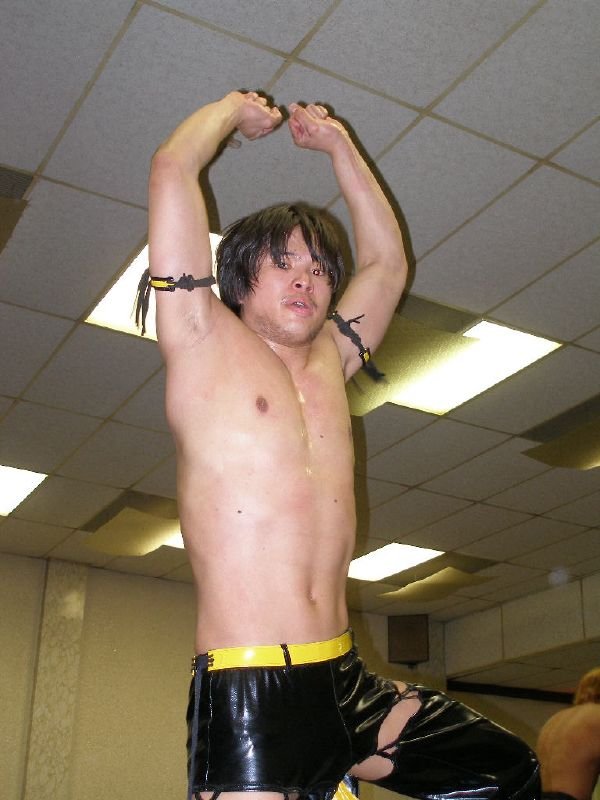
Kudo in February 2007

Trained by the Dramatic Dream Team (DDT) promotion, Kudo, then working under a mask and the ring name Konica Man #2 (コニカマン2号, Konikaman ni-gō), made his professional wrestling debut on November 30, 2001, teaming with Tomohiko Hashimoto and Fushichu Crow in a six-man tag team match, where they were defeated by Fake Sanshiro Takagi, Issei Fujisawa and Tomohiro Ishii. Through the rest of 2001 and early 2002, he worked as a low-carder, often teaming with fellow masked wrestler Hero!. On April 25, 2002, Konica Man #2, in storyline poisoned by Poison Sawada Julie, turned on Hero!, unmasked and renamed himself Toguro Habukage (トグロ・ハブ影). This started a storyline, where Habukage, under the spell of Sawada, feuded with his former partner Hero!, who was trying to get him to remember who he truly was. Habukage and Hero! faced off in a main event singles match on August 1, which was won by Hero! In late 2002, Poison Sawada Julie's control over Habukage and another minion, Hebikage, started to wear off, which led to dissension in the group and eventually to a match between Sawada and Hebikage. The over-the-top storyline continued with Sawada's "serpent god" decapitating him and turning his body into stone as punishment for his inability to create a cohesive army, while also taking away his minions, and finally concluded in January 2003, when Hero!, while supposedly on a business trip to Hong Kong, found Habukage disoriented and unable to remember anything from his past.

On January 4, 2003, Habukage, now working under the ring name Kudo and a martial artist gimmick based on his own kickboxing background, returned to DDT, teaming with Hero! in a tag team match, where they defeated Takashi Sasaki and Tanomusaku Toba. Kudo continued teaming with Hero! throughout 2003 and on December 29, the two ended the year by defeating Seiya Morohashi and Tomohiko Hashimoto, and Mikami and Onryo in a three-way Tables, Ladders, and Chairs match to win the KO-D Tag Team Championship. During 2003, Kudo also won the Puroresu Koshien singles tournament and took part in Pro Wrestling Noah's Differ Cup. Kudo and Hero! went on to lose the KO-D Tag Team Championship to Gentaro and Takashi Sasaki on February 11, 2004. On September 2, Kudo made his debut for New Japan Pro-Wrestling in a match, where he faced Wataru Inoue. Later that same month, Kudo and Hero! took part in the DDT's 2004 KO-D Tag League, eventually defeating Danshoku Dino and Glenn "Q" Spectre on September 30 to not only win the tournament, but to also regain the KO-D Tag Team Championship. However, Kudo's and Hero's second reign lasted just a month, before they were defeated by Seiya Morohashi and Tanomusaku Toba on November 2. In May 2005, Kudo won the King of DDT tournament to become the number one contender to DDT's top title, the KO-D Openweight Championship. However, he would go on to lose to Sanshiro Takagi in his title match on June 29. On July 10, Kudo defeated Kota Ibushi in his final DDT match before leaving for a nine-month learning excursion to the United States.

=== American excursion (2005–2006) ===
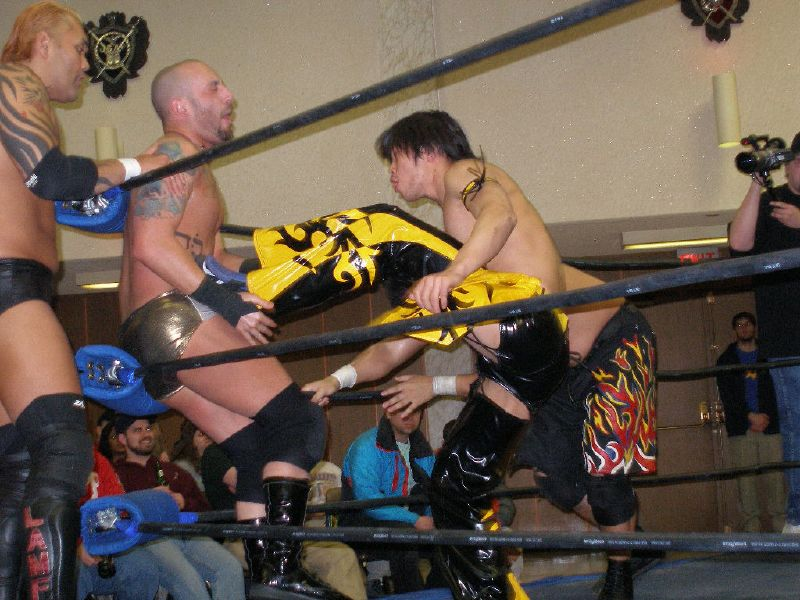
Kudo in the ring with Sal Thomaselli

On July 13, 2005, Kudo made the first appearance of his American excursion, when he defeated Eddie Kingston at an IWA East Coast event in South Charleston, West Virginia. On July 23, Kudo made his debut for Chikara, defeating Anthony Franco in the first round of the Young Lions Cup III tournament. Later that same day, Kudo was defeated by Shane Storm in a six-way elimination semifinal match, which also included Claudio Castagnoli, Crossbones, Equinox and Niles Young. Six days later, Kudo made his debut for International Wrestling Cartel (IWC), defeating Jimmy DeMarco. On August 13, Kudo returned to IWC, defeating Jason Gory. The two had a rematch thirteen days later, which was also won by Kudo. On August 19, Kudo made an appearance for Independent Wrestling Association Mid-South (IWA-MS), losing to Brandon Thomaselli. The following day, Kudo was defeated by Arik Cannon. On September 6, Kudo returned to IWA East Coast, losing to Ruckus. Three days later, Kudo returned to IWA-MS, defeating Brandon Thomaselli in a rematch of their previous month's encounter. The following day, Kudo made his debut for NWA Upstate, defeating D to the Icky, Fabulous John McChesney and Mastiff in a four-way match. On September 16, Kudo returned to Chikara, losing to Claudio Castagnoli.

On February 18, 2006, Kudo made another return to IWC, losing to fellow Japanese worker Milano Collection A.T. On February 24, Kudo entered Chikara's 2006 Tag World Grand Prix, teaming with fellow DDT worker Mikami. During the first night of the tournament, Kudo and Mikami first defeated Larry Sweeney and Mana in their first round match and then Team Kaientai Dojo (Miyawaki and Yoshiaki Yago) in their second round match. Two days later, Kudo and Mikami were eliminated from the tournament in the quarterfinals by Delirious and Hallowicked. On March 17, Kudo made his fourth and final appearance for IWA-MS, losing to Brandon Thomaselli in the final match of their trilogy against each other. The following day, Kudo was defeated by Hentai at an IWC event.

=== Return to DDT (2006–present) ===
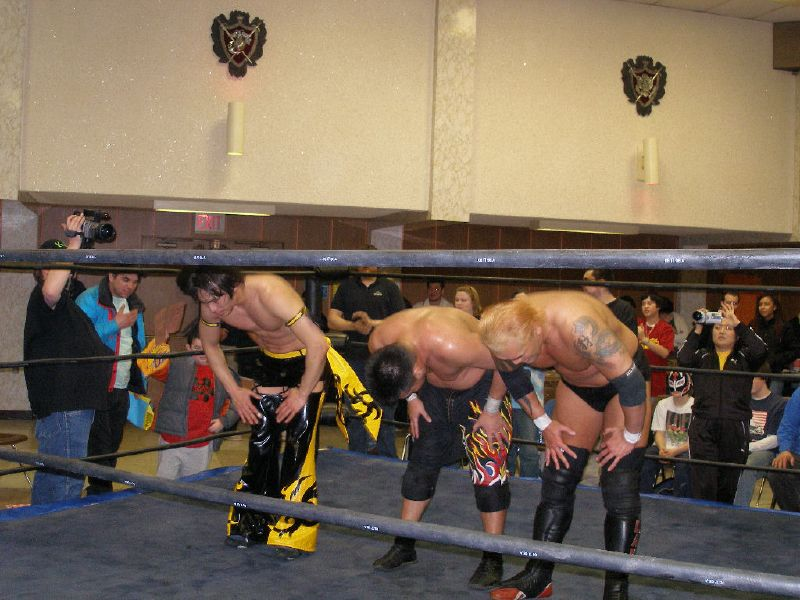
(Left to right) Kudo, Miyawaki and Yoshiaki Yago at Chikara King of Trios in February 2007

Kudo returned to Japan and DDT on April 2, 2006, teaming with Mikami in a tag team match, where they defeated Harashima (the now unmasked Hero!) and Jet Shogo. During the following months, Kudo feuded with former partner Harashima and his villainous Disaster-Box stable. On June 25, Kudo teamed with Masami Morohashi and Seiya Morohashi in a six-man tag team match for the Jiyūgaoka 6-Person Tag Team Championship, losing to the team of Harashima, Muscle Sakai and Yusuke Inokuma. On July 2, Kudo, Mikami and Shiima Xion defeated Harashima, Toru Owashi and Yusuke Inokuma to win the 2006 Takechi Six Man Tag Scramble Cup. The rivalry culminated on July 23 in an eight-man elimination tag team match, where Kudo, Mitsuya Nagai, Poison Sawada Julie and Sanshiro Takagi, representing DDT, faced Harashima, Danshoku Dino, Jet Shogo and Toru Owashi, representing Disaster-Box. Kudo scored the final elimination of the match, pinning Harashima to give DDT the win over Disaster-Box. As a result, Kudo was granted a shot at Toru Owashi's KO-D Openweight Championship on August 27, but was unable to dethrone the defending champion. After returning from a short break following an injury, Kudo turned heel and formed the Team 2 Thousand Island stable with Sanshiro Takagi and Yoshiaki Yago, continuing his rivalry with the now-face Harashima. Kudo and Harashima faced off on November 23 in a grudge match, which was won by Harashima, who, as a result, became the number one contender to the KO-D Openweight Championship, which he went on to win from Toru Owashi a month later.

On February 16, 2007, Kudo returned to Chikara, when he, Miyawaki and Yoshiaki Yago entered the 2007 King of Trios tournament. After wins over Team DDT (American Balloon, Danshoku Dino and Masamune) and The Iron Saints (Brandon, Sal and Vito Thomaselli), the trio defeated The Kings of Wrestling (Chuck Taylor, Gran Akuma and Icarus) in their semifinal match on February 18. Later that same day, Kudo, Miyawaki and Yago were defeated in the finals of the tournament by Jigsaw, Mike Quackenbush and Shane Storm. Back in DDT, Kudo received another shot at the KO-D Openweight Championship on July 1, but was this time defeated by Koo. During the second half of 2007, Kudo began regularly teaming with Yasu Urano and on September 23, the two defeated the Nuru Nuru Brothers (Michael Nakazawa and Tomomitsu Matsunaga) to become the number one contenders to the KO-D Tag Team Championship. Kudo and Urano then went on to unsuccessfully challenge Antonio Honda and Prince Togo for the title on November 3. On March 1, 2008, Kudo returned to Chikara, when he, Miyawaki and Susumu entered the 2008 King of Trios tournament as Team Japan. After wins over The Southern Saints (Marcus O'Neil, Reno Diamond and Shawn Reed) and Team AZW (AkuA, Immortal Black and Immortal White), the trio was eliminated from the tournament in the quarterfinals by BLKOUT (Eddie Kingston, Joker and Ruckus). On April 9, Kudo and Urano entered DDT's 2008 KO-D Tag Team Title League, where they made it to the finals, before losing to Mikami and Tanomusaku Toba. On May 6, Kudo won the Ironman Heavymetalweight Championship by pinning Danshoku Dino in a tag team match, where he teamed with Urano and Dino with Masa Takanashi. He would go on to lose the title to Gorgeous Matsuno on June 11. On July 6, Kudo, Urano and Antonio Honda defeated Koo, Super Vampire and Toru Owashi to win the DDT Jiyūgaoka Six-Person Tag Team Championship. On July 20, Kudo made it to the finals of a tournament to determine the number one contender to the KO-D Openweight Championship, but was there defeated by Kota Ibushi. In early 2009, Kudo made several appearances as the Frenchman Jacques de Atsushinu (ジャック・ド・アツシーヌ, Jakku Do Atsushīnu), teaming with Louis Takanashi XIV, Masa Takanashi's French character, working against the Italian Four Horsemen.

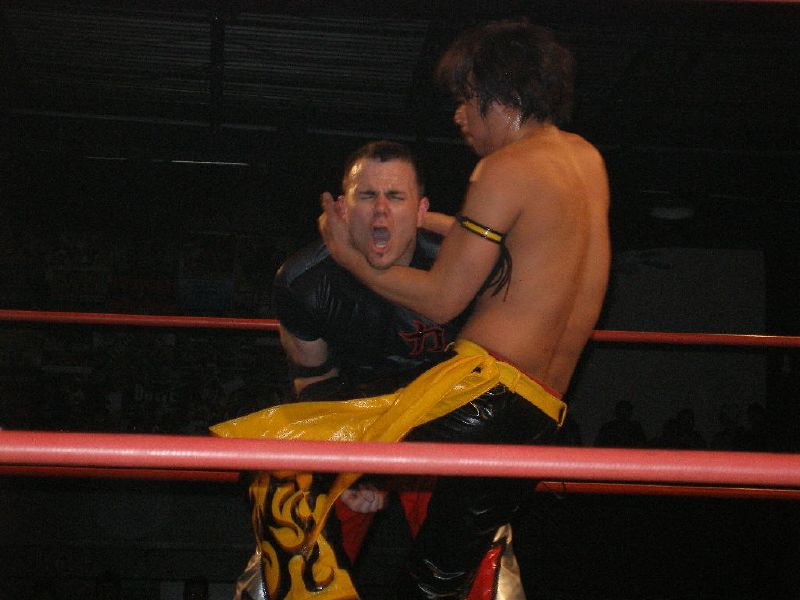
Kudo performing a knee strike on Mike Quackenbush

On March 27, 2009, Kudo made another trip to the United States and Chikara to take part in the 2009 King of Trios tournament, from which he, Kota Ibushi and Michael Nakazawa, as Team DDT, were eliminated in the first round by the Future is Now (Equinox, Helios and Lince Dorado). Two days later, on the final day of the tournament, Kudo teamed with Nakazawa, Amasis and Ophidian in an eight-man tag team match, where they defeated Darin Corbin, Ryan Cruz, Fire Ant and Soldier Ant. Upon his return to DDT, Kudo was named the number one contender to the KO-D Openweight Championship, but would once again fail to capture the title from Harashima on May 31. On July 5, Kudo and Yasu Urano wrestled Jun Kasai and Mikami to a thirty-minute time limit draw in a number one contender's three-way elimination match, which also included the team of Hoshitango and Masa Takanashi. On August 23, Kudo and Urano defeated Kasai and Mikami, Kenny Omega and Mike Angels, and defending champions Francesco Togo and Piza Michinoku in a four-way elimination match to become the new KO-D Tag Team Champions. Kudo and Urano made their first successful title defense on September 27 against the team of Great Sasuke and Sanshiro Takagi, and followed that up by also successfully defending the title against Takagi and Ultraman Robin on October 25, Danshoku Dino and Keisuke Ishii on November 15, Belt Hunter×Hunter (Hikaru Sato and Masa Takanashi) on December 6, and in a three-way match against the teams of Belt Hunter×Hunter and the Italian Four Horsemen (Antonio Honda and Sasaki & Gabbana) on December 13. On February 11, 2010, Kudo and Urano lost the title to Munenori Sawa and Sanshiro Takagi in their sixth title defense. On July 25, Kudo, Urano and Antonio Honda also lost the Jiyūgaoka Six-Person Tag Team Championship to Great Kojika, Mr. #6 and Riho in a three-way match, which also included Hikaru Sato, Keisuke Ishii and Yoshihiko, and was also contested for the DDT Nihonkai Six-Man Tag Team and UWA World Trios Championships.

In early 2011, Kudo joined the Man's Club stable, which Danshoku Dino and Makoto Oishi had formed in December 2010. On February 27, Kudo and Oishi unsuccessfully challenged Gentaro and Yasu Urano for the KO-D Tag Team Championship. On May 21, Kudo entered the 2011 King of DDT tournament. After wins over Yasu Urano and Hikaru Sato, Kudo advanced to the May 29 semifinals of the tournament, where he defeated Kenny Omega. Later that same day, Kudo defeated Harashima to win his second King of DDT tournament and become the number one contender to the KO-D Openweight Championship. On July 24, Kudo defeated Shuji Ishikawa at DDT's largest annual event, the Ryogoku Peter Pan, to win the KO-D Openweight Championship for the first time. On August 28, Kudo defeated Keisuke Ishii for his first successful title defense. On September 18, Kudo defeated Makoto Oishi in a non-title main event, after which Man's Club agreed to dissolve, with Oishi and Danshoku Dino forming the new Homoiro Clover Z stable, while Kudo was set to concentrate on defending his title. On October 23, Kudo made his second successful title defense against Hikaru Sato, and followed that up by defeating Masa Takanashi on November 6 for his third defense, and Harashima on November 27 for his fourth defense. On December 3, Kudo returned to the United States, when took part in the Indie Summit 2011, promoted by Combat Zone Wrestling (CZW), in Philadelphia, Pennsylvania, wrestling in a three-way match, where he defeated Dick Togo and Masahiro Takanashi. Later that same day, Kudo appeared on CZW's internet pay-per-view, Cage of Death 13, wrestling in a ten-man tag team match, where he, Danshoku Dino, Kengo Mashimo, Ryuji Ito and Takashi Sasaki defeated Takanashi, Jaki Numazawa, Jun Kasai, Kamui and Yoshihito Sasaki. After returning to DDT, Kudo made his fifth successful defense of the KO-D Openweight Championship on December 31 against Mikami. Before the end of the year, Kudo had also effectively become a full-time member of Homoiro Clover Z. On January 29, 2012, Kudo lost the KO-D Openweight Championship to fellow Homoiro Clover Z member Danshoku Dino.

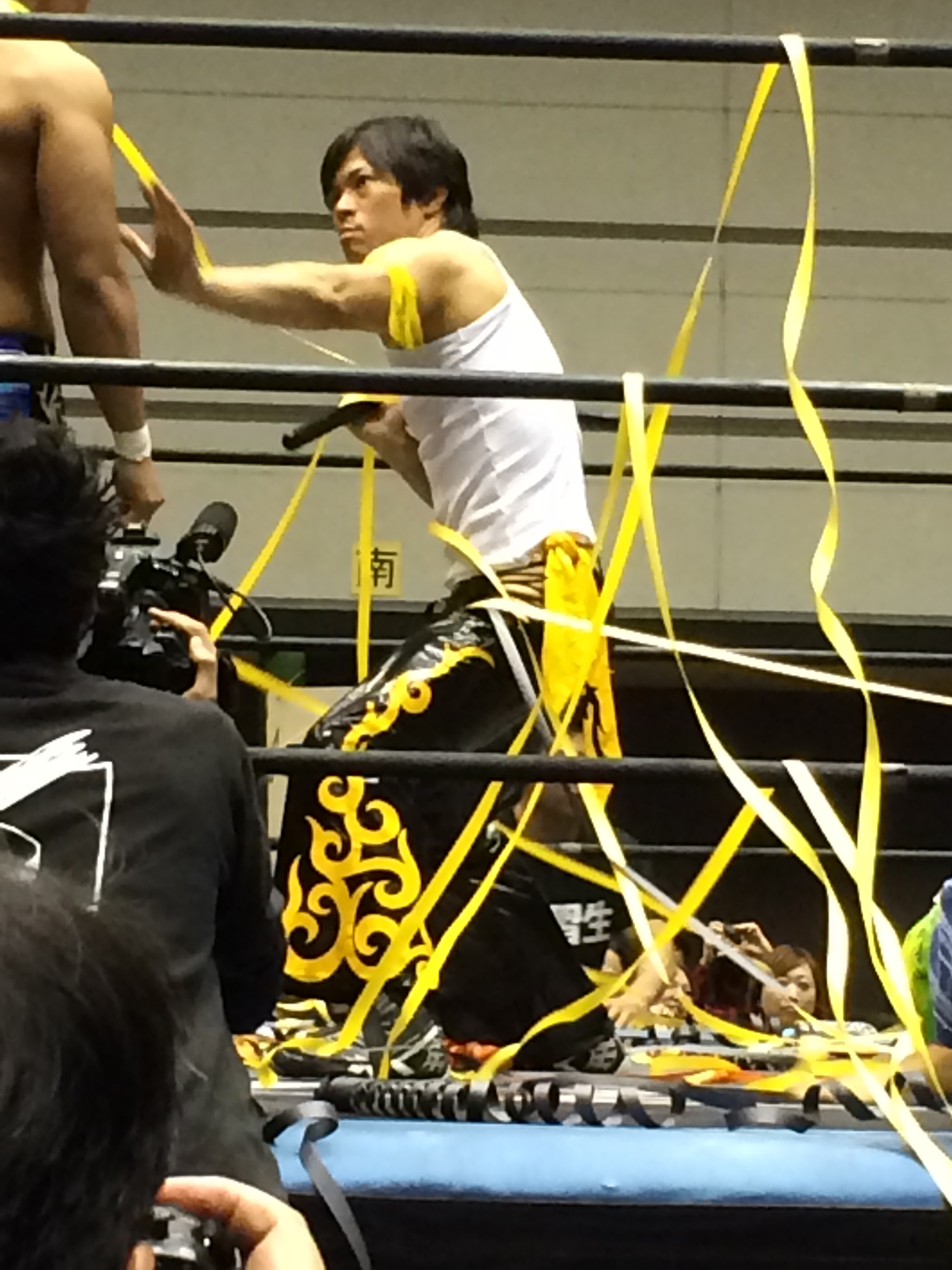
Kudo wielding his signature nunchaku

On March 20, Kudo and Dino received a shot at the KO-D Tag Team Championship, but were defeated by Sanshiro Takagi and Soma Takao. However, on June 16, Kudo and another stablemate, Makoto Oishi, defeated Crying Wolf (Yasu Urano and Yuji Hino) to win the KO-D Tag Team Championship, starting Kudo's fourth reign with the title. They made their first successful title defense just eight days later against Daisuke Sasaki and Masa Takanashi. During the summer, Kudo also made it to the semifinals of the 2012 King of DDT tournament, before losing to Danshoku Dino. After successful title defenses against Crying Wolf in a rematch, and Keisuke Ishii and Shigehiro Irie, Kudo and Oishi lost the title to Mikami and Tatsumi Fujinami on August 18 at DDT's fifteenth anniversary event in Nippon Budokan. On August 26, DDT General Manager Amon Tsurumi ordered all stables in the promotion disbanded. In Homoiro Clover Z's farewell match on September 19, Kudo, Hiroshi Fukuda and Makoto Oishi were defeated by stablemates Akito, Danshoku Dino and Kota Ibushi. Afterwards, Kudo formed a new veteran stable with Harashima and Yasu Urano to go after the villainous Team Drift (Dream Futures) stable of Keisuke Ishii, Shigehiro Irie and Soma Takao. On September 30, the veterans, now known collectively as "Urashimakudo", defeated Team Drift in the first six-man tag team match between the two stables. On October 8, Kudo and Harashima were defeated in a tag team main event by Keisuke Ishii and Shigehiro Irie, after which Kudo was sidelined with ligament damage following a dislocated right elbow.

After Yasu Urano was also injured, Urashimakudo was about to disband, but was kept alive, when Hiro Tsumaki joined the veteran stable on October 21 as a replacement for the injured members. While out with the injury, Kudo made an appearance under his old Toguro Habukage persona on November 25, 2012, when he, along with several other returning former stablemates, accompanied Poison Sawada Julie to his retirement match. On January 27, 2013, Kudo announced that he was going to return to the ring on February 17 to reform Urashimakudo. This led to Fuma, the former Hiro Tsumaki, announcing that the stable was now called Urashimafuma and he was a full-time member. However, Yasu Urano ended up turning on Fuma, kicking him out of the stable and welcoming Kudo back. On February 17, Kudo wrestled his first match in four months, a tag team match, where he and Yasu Urano defeated Danshoku Dino and Makoto Oishi. As the recipient of the MAGP Award for the MVP of the event, Kudo was entered into a tournament to determine the number one contender to the KO-D Openweight Championship, but was defeated in his first round match on February 24 by Makoto Oishi. The rivalry between Urashimakudo and Team Drift built to a six-man tag team match on August 17, during the first day of DDT's 16th anniversary weekend in Ryōgoku Kokugikan, where Team Drift was victorious. On September 29, Kudo won a ten-person battle royal to win the Ironman Heavymetalweight Championship for the second time. He lost the title to Danshoku Dino on October 13 in a tag team match, where he and Harashima were defeated by Dino and Makoto Oishi.

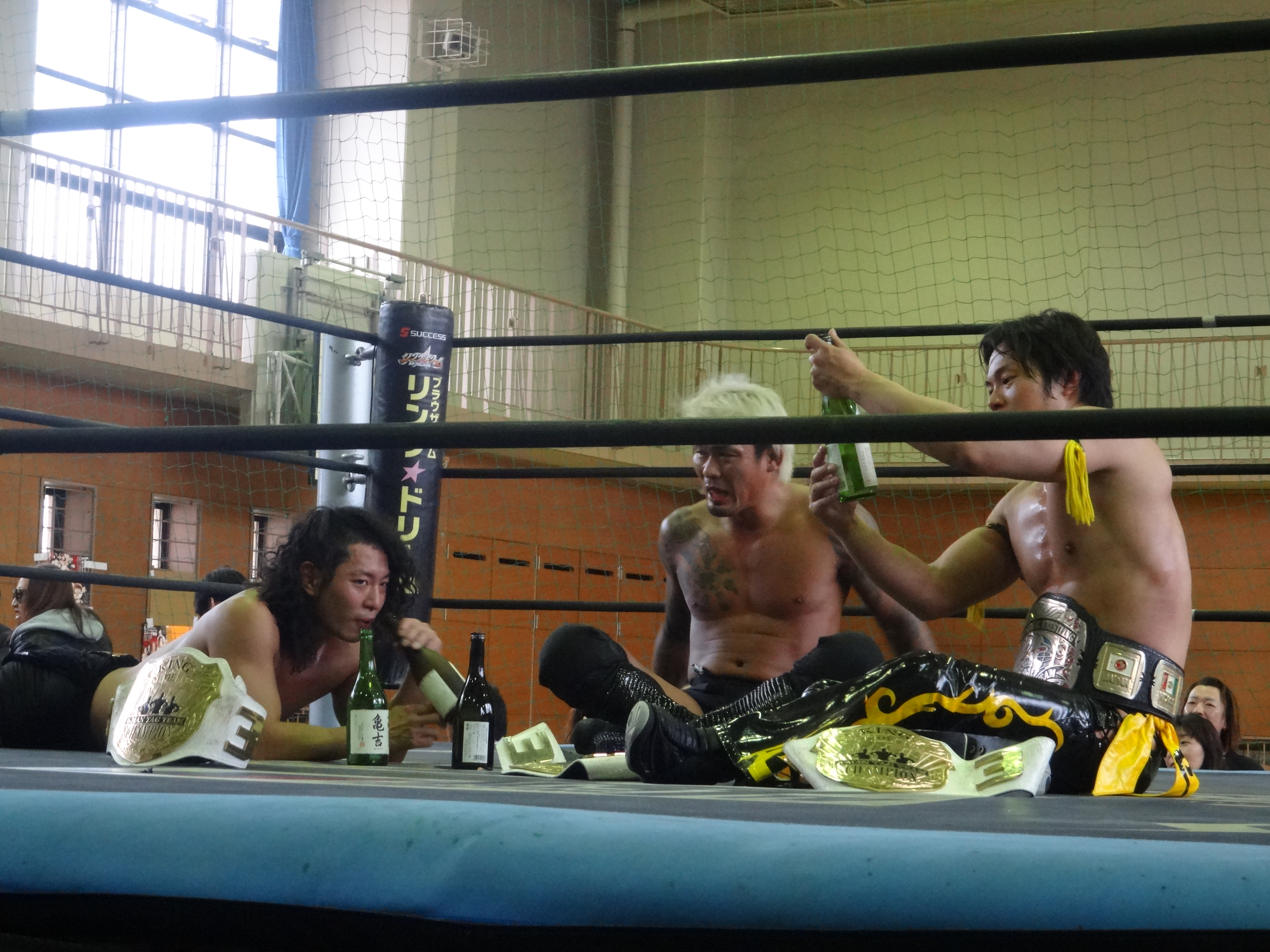
Shuten-dōji as the KO-D 6-Man Tag Team Champions in May 2014

On February 23, Kudo quit the Urashimakudo stable, while challenging Harashima to a match for the KO-D Openweight Championship. On March 2, Kudo formed a new stable with Masa Takanashi and Yukio Sakaguchi, based on the three's shared love of alcohol. On March 9, the stable was named Shuten-dōji, after a sake drinking oni of the same name. At Judgement 2014, Kudo defeated Harashima to win the KO-D Openweight Championship for the second time. Afterwards, Shuten-dōji announced they were taking over DDT with Kudo setting his sights on both the KO-D Tag Team and 6-Man Tag Team Championships alongside his stablemates. On April 29, Kudo successfully defended the KO-D Openweight Championship twice; first in a scheduled match against Akito and immediately afterwards against Yasu Urano, who cashed in his "Right to Challenge Anytime, Anywhere" contract. On May 4, Kudo won another title, when Shuten-dōji defeated Daisuke Sasaki, Kenny Omega and Kota Ibushi to capture the KO-D 6-Man Tag Team Championship. After Shuten-dōji had captured all other DDT titles, Kudo and Sakaguchi failed in their attempt to win the KO-D Tag Team Championship from Kenny Omega and Kota Ibushi on May 11. On May 25, Kudo lost the KO-D Openweight Championship back to Harashima. On June 8, Shuten-dōji made their first successful defense of the KO-D 6-Man Tag Team Championship against the new Smile Squash trio of Akito, Harashima and Yasu Urano. Also in June, Kudo made it to the finals of the 2014 King of DDT tournament, before losing to Isami Kodaka. On July 13, Shuten-dōji lost the KO-D 6-Man Tag Team Championship to Happy Motel (Antonio Honda, Konosuke Takeshita and Tetsuya Endo) in their second defense. Shuten-dōji, however, regained the title from Happy Motel just seven days later in a three-way match, which also included Team Drift. They lost the title to Team Drift on August 17 at DDT's largest event of the year, Ryogoku Peter Pan 2014. Kudo ended his year by teaming with Sakaguchi to unsuccessfully challenge Happy Motel's Endo and Takeshita for the KO-D Tag Team Championship on December 23. On February 15, 2015, Shuten-dōji won the KO-D 6-Man Tag Team Championship for the third time, defeating previous champions Genpatsu Daio (Brahman Kei, Brahman Shu and Gorgeous Matsuno). Shuten-dōji then entered a series of matches with Team Drift, where the KO-D 6-Man Tag Team Championship changed hands between the two teams three times in six weeks with Shuten-dōji losing the title on March 1, winning it on March 21, and losing it again on April 11.

On April 29, Kudo returned to the KO-D Openweight Championship picture by capturing one of the "Right to Challenge Anytime, Anywhere" contracts by pinning its holder Antonio Honda in a tag team match. Kudo quickly announced that he was cashing in his contract for a KO-D Openweight Championship match against Harashima on May 31. Before the match took place, Kudo lost his contract and title shot to Daisuke Sasaki on May 17, only to regain it a week later, putting the match with Harashima back on. On May 31, Kudo defeated Harashima to win the KO-D Openweight Championship for the third time. On June 6, Kudo defeated Danshoku Dino and Soma Takao in a non-title three-way match and, as a result, won Dino's "Right to Challenge Anytime, Anywhere" contract, putting him in a unique situation, where he had the right to challenge for his own title. On June 28, both Ken Ohka and Yasu Urano cashed in their own contracts, leading to a three-way match, where Kudo lost the KO-D Openweight Championship to Ohka. However, as he was not pinned in the match, Kudo retained his "Right to Challenge Anytime, Anywhere" contract and immediately afterwards cashed it in for a singles match, where he defeated Ohka to regain the title. On August 23 at Ryogoku Peter Pan 2015, Kudo lost the title to stablemate and 2015 King of DDT winner Yukio Sakaguchi. In September, Kudo took part in Pro Wrestling Noah's 2015 NTV G+ Cup Junior Heavyweight Tag League, teaming with fellow DDT worker Kota Umeda. After one win and two losses, Kudo was forced to pull out of the tournament on September 16, after suffering an anterior cruciate ligament injury. The following day, Kudo announced that the injury required surgery, which would sideline him for about a year.

Kudo returned from his injury on August 28, 2016, at Ryogoku Peter Pan 2016, wrestling in a tag team match, where he and Masahiro Takanashi defeated Akito and Yasu Urano. Kudo won his first title since his return on December 11, when he, Takanashi and Sakaguchi defeated Damnation (Daisuke Sasaki, Mad Paulie and Tetsuya Endo) for the KO-D 6-Man Tag Team Championship. They lost the title to Kazusada Higuchi, Kouki Iwasaki and Mizuki Watase in a three-way match, also involving Antonio Honda, Konosuke Takeshita and Trans-Am★Hiroshi, on January 22, 2017. Kudo, Takanashi and Sakaguchi won the KO-D 6-Man Tag Team Championship for a record-tying sixth time on June 25, 2017, by defeating NωA (Makoto Oishi, Mao and Shunma Katsumata). They were stripped of the title on October 10, when Kudo was sidelined with a concussion. Following Kudo's return, Shuten-dōji won the title for the seventh time by defeating All Out (Akito, Diego and Konosuke Takeshita) on December 10. After the Shuten-doji event, Kudo took an indefinite leave of absence without officially retiring. He is currently working as the manager of the DDT-owned Ebisuko Tavern.

== Personal life ==
Prior to his start in professional wrestling, Kudo had a sports background in kickboxing and shooto.

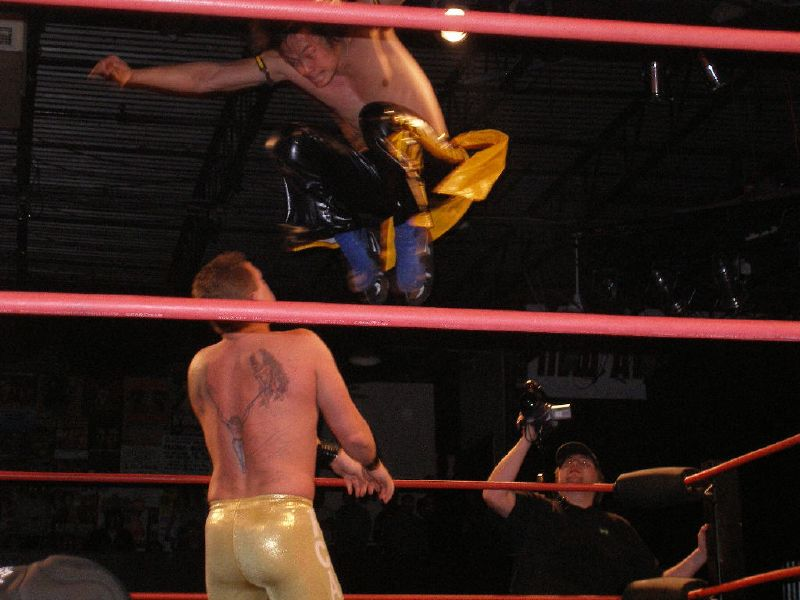
Kudo performing a diving double knee drop on Icarus

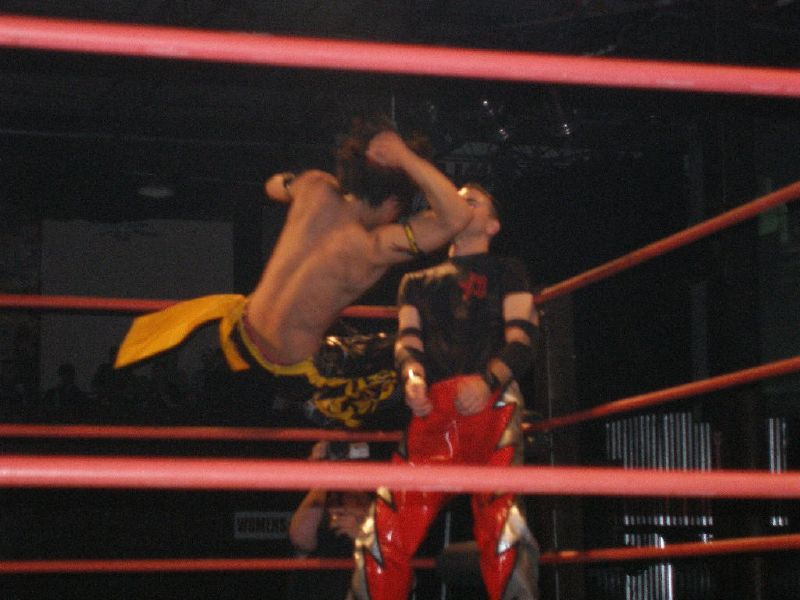
Kudo performing the "8×4" on Mike Quackenbush

== Championships and accomplishments ==
- Dramatic Dream Team / DDT Pro-Wrestling

- Ironman Heavymetalweight Championship (2 times)
- Jiyūgaoka 6-Person Tag Team Championship (1 time) – with Antonio Honda and Yasu Urano
- KO-D 6-Man Tag Team Championship (7 times) – with Masa Takanashi/Masahiro Takanashi and Yukio Sakaguchi
- KO-D Openweight Championship (4 times)
- KO-D Tag Team Championship (4 times) – with Hero! (2), Yasu Urano (1), and Makoto Oishi (1)
- King of DDT Tournament (2005, 2011)
- KO-D Tag League (2004) – with Hero!
- One Night 6-Man Tag Team Tournament (2017) – with Masahiro Takanashi and Yukio Sakaguchi
- Pro-Wrestling Koshien (2003)
- Takechi Six Man Tag Scramble Cup (2006) – with Mikami and Shiima Xion
- MAGP Award (February 17, 2013)

- Pro Wrestling Illustrated

- PWI ranked him #299 of the top 500 singles wrestlers in the PWI 500 in 2015
