= Antonio Honda =

Japanese wrestler (born 1978)

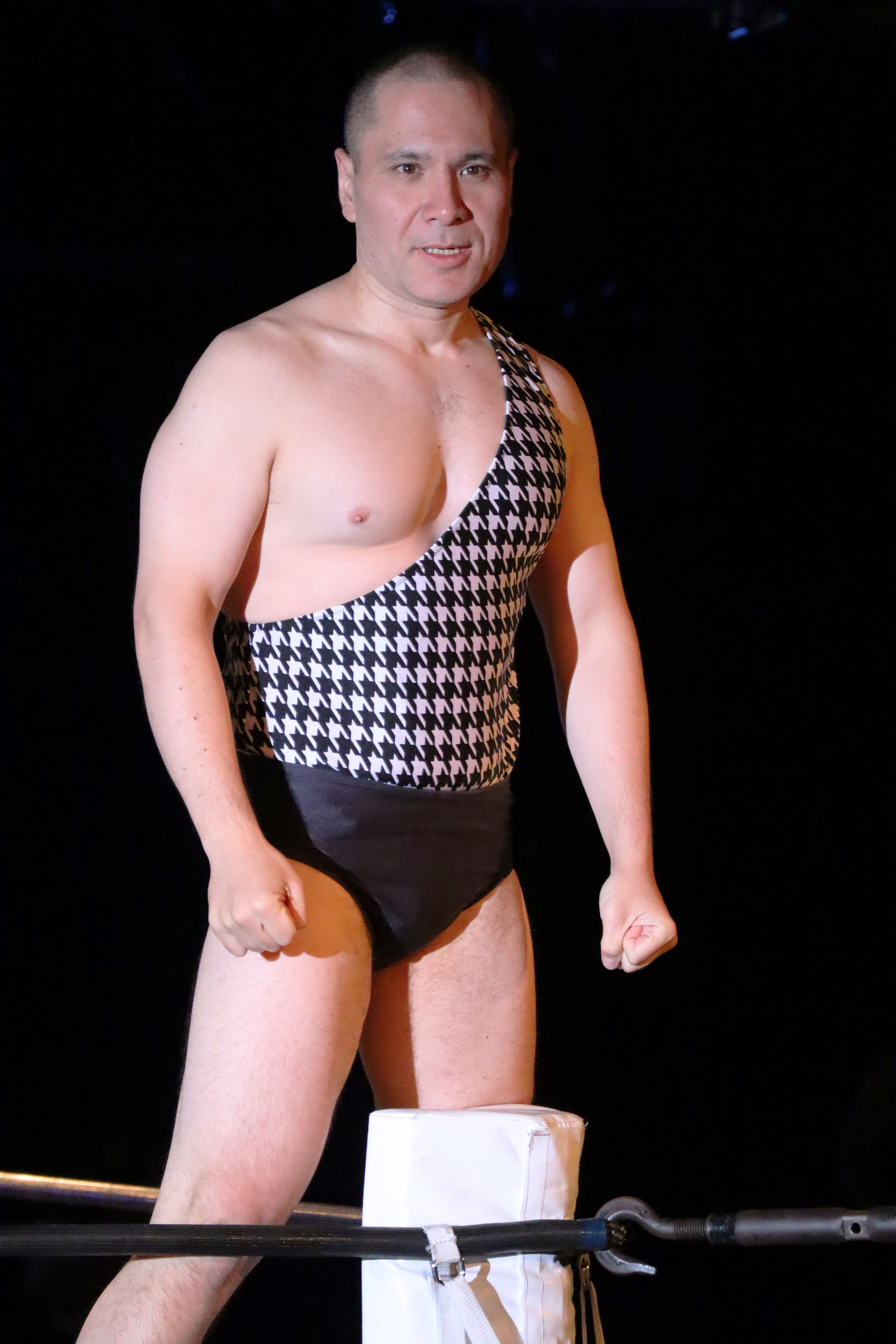
- Honda in 2020

Personal information
- Born: January 2, 1978 (age 48) Tokyo, Japan
- Relative: Tetsu Watanabe (father)

Professional wrestling career
- Ring name(s): Antonio The Dragon; Hanoreku Hogaso; A. Yazawa; Antonio Honda
- Billed height: 1.68 m (5 ft 6 in)
- Billed weight: 80 kg (176 lb)
- Trained by: Dick Togo
- Debut: 2005

Soichiro Honda (本多宗一郎, Honda Sōichirō; born January 2, 1978) is a Japanese professional wrestler, better known by his ring name Antonio Honda (アントーニオ本多, Antōnio Honda). He is working for the Japanese professional wrestling promotion DDT Pro-Wrestling (DDT). He is the son of actor Tetsu Watanabe.

== Professional wrestling career ==
=== Independent circuit (2005–present) ===
One of the rising stars of DDT Pro-Wrestling in 2007, Honda started his career as one of the "Four Italian Horsemen". He later became the leader of the aWo (Aloha World Order) stable, mainly sticking to a comedic gimmick. Honda made his professional wrestling debut as A. Yazawa at the Guts World Prowrestling's Guts World Vol. 2 event from March 15, 2005, where he teamed up with Cabbage Taro in a losing effort to Gutara and Potato Saburota. He participated in one of the longest matches in professional wrestling history, a 108-man battle royal at Tenka Sanbun no Kei: New Year's Eve Special, a cross-over event held between Big Japan Pro Wrestling, DDT and Kaientai Dojo from December 31, 2009, competing against other infamous wrestlers such as Great Kojika, Taka Michinoku, Kenny Omega, Abdullah Kobayashi, and the winner of the match, Jun Kasai. On November 2, 2016, at Wrestle-1's W-1 Tour 2016 Autumn Bout, Honda teamed up with Konosuke Takeshita as part of the Happy Motel stable to defeat Keiji Mutoh and Jiro Kuroshio. At Ice Ribbon's New Ice Ribbon #700 (RibbonMania 2015: Neko Nitta Retirement Show) from December 31, 2015, he teamed up with Mochi Miyagi to defeat Gentaro and Yuji Hino, and Jun Kasai and Miyako Matsumoto in a three-way intergender tag team match. On April 5, 2019, at the WrestleCon Joey Ryan's Penis Party, a freelance event held and produced by Joey Ryan, Honda participated in a 7-person gauntlet match also involving Danshoku Dino, Makoto Oishi, Sanshiro Takagi, Mao, Maki Itoh and Yoshihiko (a love doll) for the Ironman Heavymetalweight Championship.

=== DDT Pro-Wrestling/Pro Wrestling Basara (2005–present) ===
Honda defeated Gentaro at Never Mind 2010 to become the interim KO-D Openweight Champion. A unification match took place at Sweet Dreams! 2011 on January 30, where he was eventually defeated by Dick Togo.

He is a former multiple-time KO-D 6-Man Tag Team Champion, title which he won as part of Monster Army alongside stablemates Daisuke Sasaki, Hoshitango, and Yuji Hino at Sweet Dreams! on January 27, and Road to Ryōgoku in Hiroshima: Dramatic Dream Toukasan on June 23, 2013. He also won the championship as part of the Happy Motel stable alongside Konosuke Takeshita and Tetsuya Endo at Road to Ryōgoku in Osaka: Dramatic Dream Tsutenkaku on July 13, 2014.

On April 28, 2019, he defeated Harashima in a Panty-Hunt Tiger Club Rope Deathmatch at Max Bump 2019 to win the DDT Extreme Championship.

At Kawasaki Strong 2021 on February 14, Honda teamed up with Kazuki Hirata, Shinya Aoki and Super Sasadango Machine to win the vacant KO-D 8-Man Tag Team Championship by defeating Danshoku Dino, Makoto Oishi, Sanshiro Takagi and Toru Owashi.

== Championships and accomplishments ==
- DDT Pro-Wrestling

- DDT Extreme Championship (2 times)
- Interim KO-D Openweight Championship (1 time)
- Ironman Heavymetalweight Championship (29 times - 1 with Mizuki Watase, Danshoku Dino and Yukio Naya)
- O-40 Championship (1 time)
- Jiyūgaoka 6-Person Tag Team Championship (1 time) – with Kudo and Yasu Urano
- KO-D 6-Man Tag Team Championship (3 times) – with Daisuke Sasaki and Yuji Hino (1), Yuji Hino and Hoshitango (1), and Konosuke Takeshita and Tetsuya Endo (1)
- KO-D 8-Man/10-Man Tag Team Championship (3 times) – with Kazuki Hirata, Super Sasadango Machine and Shinya Aoki (1) Toru Owashi, Kazuki Hirata and Yoshihiko (1) and Masahiro Takanashi, Takayuki Ueki, Takeshi Masada and Mecha Mummy (1)
- KO-D Tag Team Championship (2 times) – with Daisuke Sasaki (1) and Prince Togo (1)

- Gatoh Move Pro Wrestling/ChocoPro

- Asia Dream Tag Team Championship (1 time) – with Tokiko Kirihara
- IWA Triple Crown Championship (1 time)

- Pro-Wrestling Basara

- UWA World Trios Championship (1 time) – with Francesco Togo and Piza Michinoku

- Kensuke Office
  - Summer Volcano Tag Tournament (2011) – with Kento Miyahara
- Gokigen Pro Wrestling
  - YJF Tag Team Championship (1 time, current) – with Hagane Shinno
- Pro Wrestling Illustrated
  - Ranked No. 496 of the top 500 singles wrestlers in the PWI 500 in 2021
