= Great Kojika =

Japanese professional wrestler (born 1942)

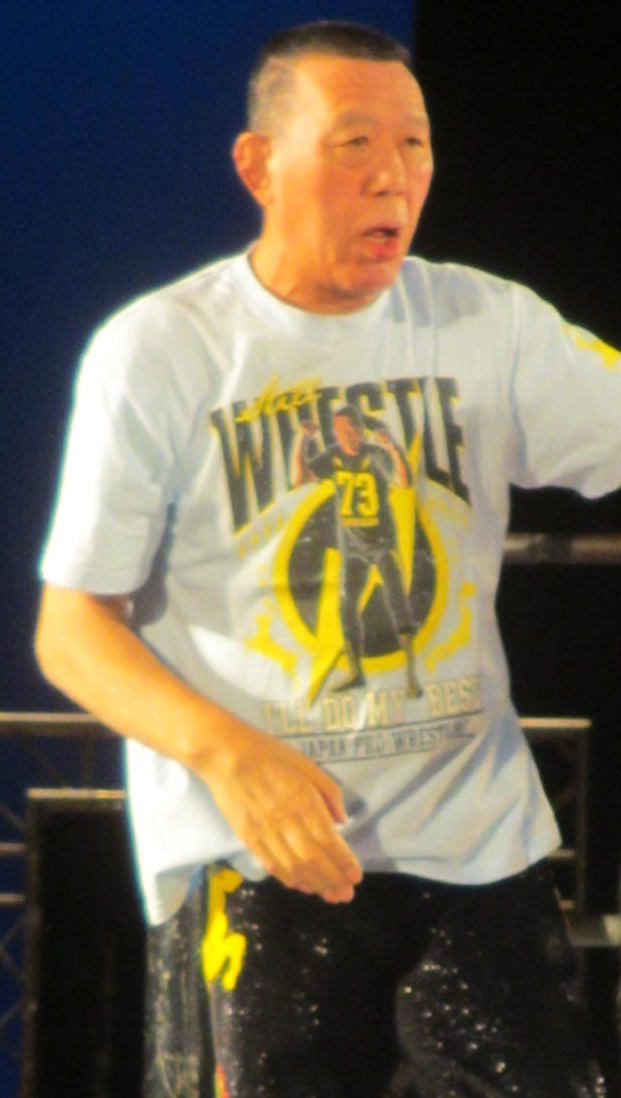
- Kojika in 2015

Personal information
- Born: Shinya Koshika; April 28, 1942 (age 84) Hakodate, Hokkaido, Japan

Professional wrestling career
- Ring name(s): Kung Fu Lee; Raizō Kojika; Shinya Kojika; Great Kojika; Dory Boy
- Billed height: 6 ft 0 in (1.83 m)
- Billed weight: 251 lb (114 kg)
- Trained by: Rikidozan
- Debut: October 13, 1963

Shinya Koshika (小鹿 信也, Koshika Shinya; born April 28, 1942), known by his ring name Great Kojika (グレート小鹿, Gurēto Kojika), is a Japanese professional wrestler. He co-founded the promotion Big Japan Pro Wrestling (BJW). Kojika is the oldest active Japanese wrestler as well as the one with the longest career, having debuted in 1963. He is also the oldest active wrestler in the world.

== Professional wrestling career ==
=== Early career (1963–1967) ===
Kojika made his debut on October 13, 1963, for Japan Pro Wrestling Alliance (JWA) against Kakutaro Koma (future NWA World Middleweight Champion Mashio Koma). In 1967, he left Japan to wrestle in North America.

=== North America (1967-1970) ===
In 1967, Kojika made his debut in North America for NWA Mid-America in Tennessee. He teamed with Motoshi Okuma and they also worked for Georgia Championship Wrestling. They disbanded in 1968 and Kojika went to Florida, Detroit and St. Louis. In 1969, Kojika went to Los Angeles and won the NWA "Beat the Champ" Television Championship by defeating Pepper Martin on November 19. A month later he dropped the title back to Martin. On August 26, 1970, he defeated Les Roberts for the TV title and held it until losing to The Great Goliath on September 16. After the loss, Kojika went back to Japan.

=== Return to Japan and folding of JWA (1970–1973) ===
After a few years in the United States, Kojika returned to Japan and stayed with Japan Pro Wrestling Alliance until the company folded on April 14, 1973.

=== Return to North America (1973–1974, 1980) ===
In 1973, Kojika returned to the United States to wrestle in Texas as Kung Fu Lee. He would feud with Dory Funk Jr., Terry Funk, Ricky Romero and Akio Sato. He left Texas in 1974. In 1980, he went to Hawaii to work for NWA Polynesian.

=== All Japan Pro Wrestling (1973–1986) ===
After the folding of JWA, Kojika went to Giant Baba's All Japan Pro Wrestling (AJPW) where he reunited with Motoshi Okuma. From 1976 to 1981, he and Okuma won the All Asia Tag Team Championship three times. They were together until 1986 when Kojika retired from wrestling.

=== Big Japan Pro Wrestling (1995–2002) ===
Kojika returned to wrestling in 1995, co-founding Big Japan Pro Wrestling (BJW) with Kazuo Sakurada where it was a style based on deathmatches and King's Road style. He started wrestling again in 1996. He retired for the second time in 2002. He continued co-promoting Big Japan.

=== Second return to wrestling (2006–present) ===
In 2006, Kojika return to wrestling for the second time. He still wrestles for Big Japan and numerous Japanese promotions at 80 years old.

=== Return to All Japan Pro Wrestling (2019) ===
Kojika returned to All Japan Pro Wrestling in 2019 after having last worked for them in 1986.

== Championships and accomplishments ==
- All Japan Pro Wrestling
  - All Asia Tag Team Championship (4 times) – with Motoshi Okuma (3) and Gantetsu Matsuoka (1)
- Big Japan Pro Wrestling
  - Yokohama Shopping Street 6-Man Tag Team Championship (1 time) – with Masato Inaba and Kankuro Hoshino
- DDT Pro-Wrestling
  - Jiyūgaoka 6-Person Tag Team Championship (1 time) – with Mr. #6 and Riho
  - Sea Of Japan 6-Person Tag Team Championship (1 time) – with Mr. #6 and Riho
  - UWA World Trios Championship (1 time) – with Mr. #6 and Riho
- National Wrestling Alliance
  - NWA Western States Heavyweight Championship (1 time)
- NWA Hollywood Wrestling
  - NWA Americas Heavyweight Championship (1 times)
  - NWA Americas Tag Team Championship (2 times) – with Don Carson (1) and John Tolos (1)
- Niigata Pro Wrestling
  - Niigata Tag Team Championship (2 times) – with Shigeno Shima (2)
- Pro Wrestling Freedoms
  - King of Freedom World Tag Team Championship (1 time, inaugural) – with The Winger
