= Baliyan Akki =

Indian professional wrestler

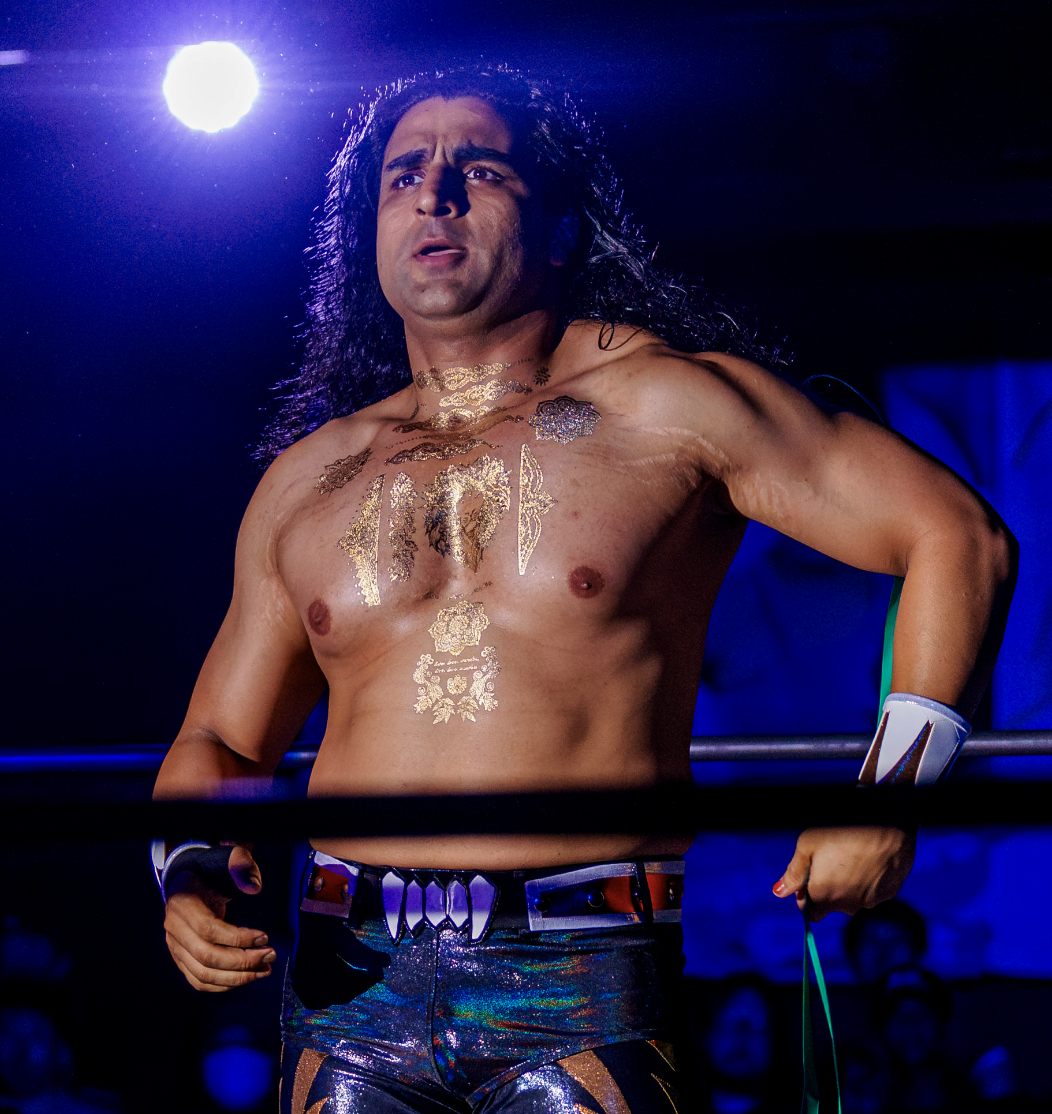
- Akki in May, 2026

Personal information
- Born: May 30, 1995 (age 31) Muzaffarnagar, India

Professional wrestling career
- Ring name: Baliyan Akki
- Billed height: 175 cm (5 ft 9 in)
- Billed weight: 78 kg (172 lb)
- Debut: 2015

Ankur Baliyan, better known by his ring name Baliyan Akki, is an Indian professional wrestler currently working for the Japanese promotion Gatoh Move Pro Wrestling and Wrestling Xtreme Mania (WXM). He is known for his performances in various other promotions from the Japanese independent circuit such as DDT Pro-Wrestling (DDT) and All Japan Pro Wrestling (AJPW).

== Professional wrestling career ==
=== Indian independent circuit (2015–2017) ===
Baliyan made his professional wrestling debut in Wrestle Square, a promotion from the Indian independent scene. He succeeded in holding the intercontinental championship of the promotion on three different occasions. He spent roughly two years in various promotions from the circuit, before going to Japan at the beginning of 2017.

=== Gatoh Move (2017–present) ===
Baliyan is mainly known for his tenure with Gatoh Move Pro Wrestling. He made his debut at Gatoh Move Japan Tour #325 on December 2, 2017, where he teamed up with Choun Shiryu to defeat Emi Sakura and Masahiro Takanashi. During his time in the promotion, he formed the tag team of "Best Bros" with Mei Suruga, alongside whom he would chase for the Asia Dream Tag Team Championship, titles which they first won at ChocoPro 76 on December 31, 2020, by defeating Reset (Emi Sakura and Kaori Yoneyama). He is also a former Super Asia Champion, a title which he first won in an interim phase by defeating Choun Shiryu at ChocoPro 197 on January 29, 2022, and then lineal champion Minoru Fujita to became the undisputed titleholder at ChocoPro 200 on February 13, 2022.

Baliyan competed in Ganbare☆Pro-Wrestling's 2021 edition of the Ganbare Climax tournament, where he fell short to Yumehito Imanari in the first rounds, a competition which was also disputed for the inaugural Spirit of Ganbare World Openweight Championship. He competed at NJPW Strong's Fighting Spirit Unleashed on October 28, 2023, where he teamed up with Titus Alexander and Jakob Austin Young, losing to Team Filthy (Jorel Nelson, Royce Isaacs, and Danny Limelight).

=== All Japan Pro Wrestling (2020–2022) ===
Baliyan made his first appearance in All Japan Pro Wrestling (AJPW) on the second night of the AJPW Summer Action Series II 2020 on August 23, where he fell short to Francesco Akira. He continued to make sporadic appearances, especially in signature events. One of them was the Champion Carnival, in which he competed in the 2020 edition, but not as part of the big tournament. He teamed up with Yusuke Okada on the third night of the event, September 13, where they fell short to Jin (Fuminori Abe and Jake Lee). On the first night of the AJPW New Year Wars 2022 from January 2, he competed in the traditional battle royal won by Rising Hayato, which also involved other notable opponents like Menso-re Oyaji, Shigehiro Irie, Shuji Ishikawa, Takao Omori, Yoshi Tatsu, and the Saito Brothers.

=== Tokyo Joshi Pro Wrestling (2021-present) ===
Baliyan has appeared since 2021 in Tokyo Joshi Pro Wrestling, where he does not wrestle but instead serves as an English-language commentator and translator for major TJPW events. His notable appearances as part of TJPW's English commentary team include every TJPW Grand Princess since 2022 and every TJPW Wrestle Princess since 2023.

=== North American independent circuit (2022–present) ===
Baliyan briefly competed in several promotions from the American independent scene as a talent sent overseas by Gatoh Move. In All Elite Wrestling, he started in AEW Dark, making his first appearance at AEW Dark #157, which was taped July 16, 2022 and released on August 16, where he fell short against Angélico in singles competition. At AEW Dark #180 on December 17, 2022, he teamed up with Marcus Kross and Vary Morales in a losing effort against The Dark Order (Alex Reynolds and John Silver) in a six-man tag team match.

In Game Changer Wrestling, Baliyan made his first appearance at GCW Jimmy Lloyd's D-Generation F on March 31, 2023, where he teamed up with Mei Suruga and fell short to Wasted Youth (Dyln McKay and Marcus Mathers), CPF (Danny Black and Joe Lando), and The Bang Bros (August Matthews and Davey Bang) in a four-way tag team match.

In CMLL, Baliyan participated in the Grand Prix Internacional 2023 Torneo Cibernetico, in a bout in which he teamed up with Adrian Quest, Francesco Akira, Hiromu Takahashi, Kushida, Rocky Romero, Samuray del Sol, and TJP as "Team International" in a losing effort to Team Mexico (Ángel de Oro, Averno, Dragón Rojo Jr., Mascara Dorada, Místico, Templario, Ultimo Guerrero, and Volador Jr.).

At TRP The Spindle City Rumble, an event promoted by Top Rope Promotions on December 30, 2022, Baliyan competed in the Spindle City rumble won by Jora Johl and involving notable opponents such as Elia Markopoulos and Bob Evans.

=== WXM (Wrestling Xtreme Mania) (2025-Present) ===
Akki joined WXM (Wrestling Xtreme Mania), a new Indian wrestling promotion, in 2025, as part of a faction with Mei Suruga and Anthony Greene as his tag team members. Their faction name is JAI Connection (Japan-America-India Connection). They have become WXM's first tag team champions.

== Championships and accomplishments ==
- Gatoh Move Pro Wrestling
  - Super Asia Championship (1 time)
  - Interim Super Asia Championship (1 time)
  - Asia Dream Tag Team Championship (2 times) – with Mei Suruga
- Pro Wrestling Illustrated
  - Ranked No. 378 of the top 500 singles wrestlers in the PWI 500 of 2023
- Wrestling Xtreme Mania
  - WXM World Tag Team Championship (1 time, inaugural, current) - with Anthony Greene
- Wrestle Square
  - Wrestle Square Intercontinental Championship (3 Times)
