= Sayaka Obihiro =

Japanese professional wrestler

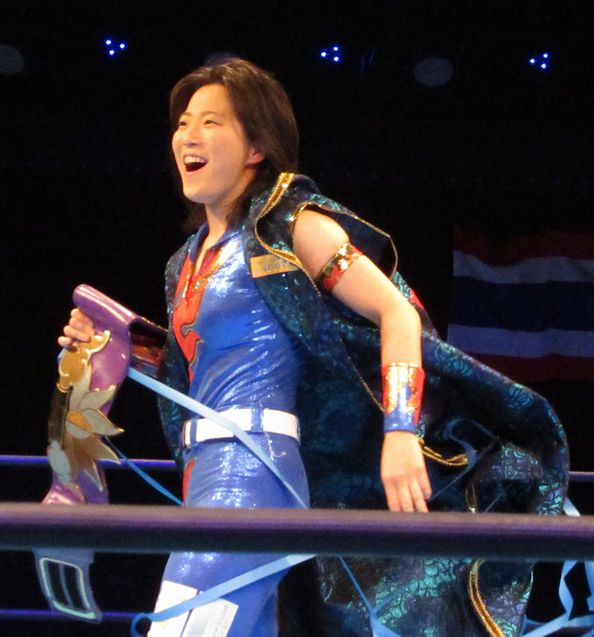
- Obihiro in June 2016

Personal information
- Born: September 2, 1986 (age 39) Sapporo, Japan

Professional wrestling career
- Ring name(s): Ultraman Obin; Sayaka Obihiro
- Billed height: 158 cm (5 ft 2 in)
- Billed weight: 60 kg (132 lb)
- Trained by: Emi Sakura
- Debut: 2010

Sayaka Obihiro (帯広さやか, Obihiro Sayaka) is a Japanese professional wrestler currently working as a freelancer and is best known for her tenure with the Japanese promotions Gatoh Move Pro Wrestling, Ice Ribbon and JWP Joshi Puroresu.

== Professional wrestling career ==
=== Independent circuit (2010–present) ===
As a freelancer, Obihiro is known for working with other several promotions. At Stardom Natsuki Taiyo Retirement Match, an event promoted by World Wonder Ring Stardom on January 6, 2014, she teamed up with Hatsuhinode Kamen and Kaori Yoneyama to unsuccessfully challenge Hiroyo Matsumoto, Mayu Iwatani and Miho Wakizawa for the Artist of Stardom Championship. At WAVE Weekday Wave Vol. 89, an event promoted by Pro Wrestling Wave on April 22, 2015 where she competed in a gauntlet match won by Hikaru Shida and also involving Kyoko Kimura, Moeka Haruhi, Ryo Mizunami and Shuu Shibutani. At W-1 Wrestle-1 Tour 2015 Daydream, an event promoted by Wrestle-1 on June 20, Obihiro fell short to Saki. At Reina Makoto 10th Anniversary, an event promoted by Pro Wrestling Reina on October 28, 2016, Obihiro competed in a 14-person battle royal won by Hanako Nakamori and also involving Masaya Takahashi, Choun Shiryu, Reyna Isis, Mr. Gannosuke, Rina Yamashita and others. At DDT Tavern Pro Wrestling ~ Alcohol Mania 2017 ~, an event promoted by DDT Pro Wrestling on March 23, 2017, Obihiro competed in a five-way match won by Joey Ryan and also involving Cherry, Tatsuhiko Yoshino and Yusuke Kubo.

==== Gatoh Move Pro Wrestling (2013–present) ====
Obihiro is also part of Gatoh Move Pro Wrestling's roster. At Gatoh Move Japan Tour #319 on October 31, 2017, she competed in a Halloween costume battle royal also involving Antonio Honda, Hagane Shinnou, Kazuhiro Tamura, Masahiro Takanashi and others.

==== Ice Ribbon (2010–2012) ====
Obihiro made his professional wrestling debut at Ice Ribbon New Ice Ribbon #179 on April 29, 2010 where she fell short to Kazumi Shimōma. At Ice Ribbon New Ice Ribbon #225 on October 10, 2010, she participated in a 18-person battle royal won by Riho and also involving Chii Tomiya, Yuko Miyamoto, Nanae Takahashi, Jun Kasai, Jaki Numazawa and others. At New Year Ribbon on January 4, 2012, Obihiro competed in another 18-person battle royal also involving notable opponents such as Tsukushi, Tsukasa Fujimoto, Hiragi Kurumi, Gentaro, Hamuko Hoshi and others.

==== JWP Joshi Puroresu (2010–2016) ====
Obihiro is also known for competing in JWP Joshi Puroresu. At JWP Revolution 2010 on December 12, she unsuccessfully challenged Sawako Shimono in a tournament final for the #1 contendership for the JWP Junior Championship and Princess of Pro-Wrestling Championship. At JWP Climax 2011 on December 23, she participated in a 15-man battle royal won by Abdullah Kobayashi and also involving Sanshiro Takagi, Takashi Sasaki, The Great Kabuki, Great Kojika and others. On the second night of the 2012 edition of the Tag League the Best, she unsuccessfully challenged Kaori Yoneyama in a singles match.

== Championships and accomplishments ==
- Gatoh Move Pro Wrestling
  - Asia Dream Tag Team Championship (3 times, current) – with Aoi Kizuki (1), Chie Koishikawa (1) and Minoru Fujita (1)
- Ice Ribbon
  - International Ribbon Tag Team Championship (2 times) – with Aoi Kizuki (1) and Kyoko Kimura (1)
  - Reina World Tag Team Championship (1 time) – with Kyoko Kimura
