= Miya Yotsuba =

Japanese wrestler

Personal information
- Born: April 8 Higashihiroshima, Japan

Professional wrestling career
- Ring name: Miya Yotsuba
- Billed height: 165 cm (5 ft 5 in)
- Trained by: Mei Suruga
- Debut: 2022

Miya Yotsuba (四ツ葉 ミヤ, Yotsuba Miya) is a Japanese professional wrestler, currently working for ChocoPro. She is a former one time Asia Dream Tag Team Champion and one-time Super Asia Champion.

== Professional wrestling career ==
=== Gatoh Move Pro Wrestling / ChocoPro (2022–present) ===
Yotsuba debuted as a professional wrestler at Phoenix Rises, an event promoted by Gatoh Move Pro Wrestling on September 15, 2022, where she fell short to Emi Sakura.

At Rivals on November 28, 2025, Yotsuba teamed up with Soy as Miya Soy to defeat Bellflowers (Sayaka and Makoto) for the Asia Dream Tag Team Championship.

Yotsuba defeated Rina Yamashita to win the Super Asia Championship at The Promised on March 23, 2026.

== Championships and accomplishments ==
- ChocoPro
  - Super Asia Championship (1 time)
  - Asia Dream Tag Team Championship (1 time) – with Soy
