= Choun Shiryu =

Japanese wrestler (born 1978)

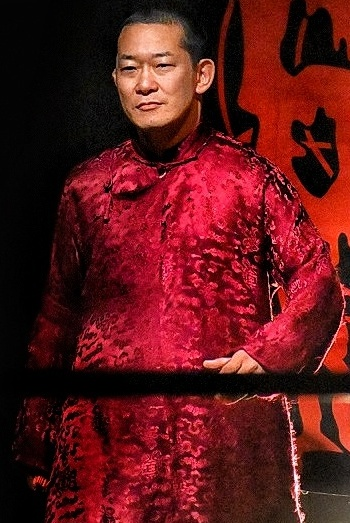
- Chōun in February 2020

Personal information
- Born: November 21, 1978 (age 47) Japan

Professional wrestling career
- Ring name(s): Cho-un "Bones" Shiryu; Choun-Akitoshi; Super Chino; Ryan Upin; Choun Shiryu
- Billed height: 165 cm (5 ft 5 in)
- Billed weight: 65 kg (143 lb)
- Debut: 2004

Choun Shiryu (趙雲子龍, Chō'un Shiryū) is a Japanese professional wrestler currently working as a freelancer and is best known for his time in the Japanese promotions DDT Pro-Wrestling and Gatoh Move Pro Wrestling. His ring name is based on the Chinese military general Zhao Yun who lived during the late Eastern Han dynasty and early Three Kingdoms period of China.

== Professional wrestling career ==
=== Independent circuit (2004–present) ===
As a freelancer, Chōun is known for competing in various promotions. He once competed for Osaka Pro Wrestling on March 24, 2009, at Osaka Happy Weekday where he teamed up with Muscle Sakai to defeat Black Buffalo and Tigers Mask. Dotonbori He participated in one of the longest matches in professional wrestling history, a 108-man battle royal at Tenka Sanbun no Kei: New Year's Eve Special, a cross-over event held between Big Japan Pro Wrestling, DDT and Kaientai Dojo from December 31, 2009, competing against other infamous wrestlers such as Kankuro Hoshino, Taka Michinoku, Kenny Omega, Abdullah Kobayashi, and the winner of the match, Jun Kasai. At AJPW Dream Power Series 2018, an event promoted by All Japan Pro Wrestling on March 19, he fought into a 17-man battle royal also involving Atsushi Maruyama, Survival Tobita, Naoshi Sano, Chango and others. On January 22, 2017, he participated at Kyoko Kimura's Retirement Produce where he competed in a Toshimen Pool Ticket Contest Battle Royal also involving the winner Kagetsu, Kaoru, Mayu Iwatani, Mayumi Ozaki, Tsukasa Fujimoto and others. At W-1 Tour 2017 Outbreak, an event promoted by Wrestle-1 on June 11, Chōun picked up a victory over Andy Wu.

==== DDT Pro-Wrestling (2004–present) ====
Chōun made his professional wrestling debut at DDT Muscle 1, an event promoted by DDT Pro-Wrestling on October 13, 2004, where he defeated Munenori Sawa and Rikiya in a three-way match. At December 21, 2017 on February 16, he competed in a 13-man battle royal to determine the newest member of the "Junretsu" stable won by Andreza Giant Panda and also involving Konosuke Takeshita, Akito, Saki Akai, Yukio Sakaguchi and others. Earlier that night, he competed in a six-man tag team match in which he teamed up with Pedro Takaishi and Great Kojika to defeat Ken Ohka, Makoto Oishi and Yasu Urano.

Though he appeared mainly in DDT's sub-brand New Beijing Pro-Wrestling (a parody of both New Japan Pro-Wrestling and Chinese history) Chōun also competed in various DDT signature events. He made his first DDT Peter Pan appearance at Ryōgoku Peter Pan on August 23, 2009, where he competed in a Rumble rules match for the Ironman Heavymetalweight Championship won by Toru Owashi and also involving Shoichi Ichimiya, DJ Nira and others. At Budokan Peter Pan on August 18, 2012, he teamed up with Kazuhiro Tamura, Masashi Takeda, Masato Shibata, Shota and Kotaro Nasu as Team Style-E in a losing effort to Team Muscle (Muscle Sakai, Pedro Takaishi, Kazuyoshi Sakai HG, Norokazu Fujioka, Mr. Magic and Seiya Morohashi) as a result of a Twelve-man tag team match.

As for the DDT Judgement branch of events, Chōun first wrestled at DDT 10th Anniversary: Judgement 2007 on March 11 where he teamed up with Norikazu Fujioka and defeated Isami and 726, Yusuke Inokuma and Gorgeous Matsuno, and Mikami and Susumu in a Four-way tag team match.

==== Gatoh Move Pro Wrestling (2012–present) ====
Chōun spent a considerable part of his career working for Gatoh Move Pro Wrestling. At Gatoh Move Japan Tour #328 on December 21, 2017, he teamed up with Baliyan Akki to unsuccessfully challenge Emi Sakura and Masahiro Takanashi for the Asia Dream Tag Team Championship. At Gatoh Move Good Work Summer on July 28, 2018, he teamed up with Baliyan Akki in a losing effort to Saki and Ryuichi Sekine.

==== Ice Ribbon (2006–2020) ====
Chōun had a long tenure with the Joshi puroresu promotion Ice Ribbon despite being a male wrestler. At Ice Ribbon 298 on June 11, 2011, he teamed up with Makoto Oishi and defeated Lovely Butchers (Hamuko Hoshi and Mochi Miyagi) to win the International Ribbon Tag Team Championship. At Yokohama Ribbon on November 24, 2018, he defeated Akane Fujita and Matsuya Uno in a three-way match to win the Triangle Ribbon Championship, thus becoming the first male wrestler to hold the title.

== Championships and accomplishments ==
- DDT Pro-Wrestling

- Ironman Heavymetalweight Championship (5 times)
- Greater China Unified Sichuan Openweight Championship (1 time)
- Greater China Unified Zhongyuan Tag Team Championship (1 time) – with Cao Zhang

- Fukumen Mania

- Fukumen MANIA Super Lightweight Championship (1 time)

- Gatoh Move Pro Wrestling

- Interim Super Asia Championship (1 time)
- Asia Dream Tag Team Championship (1 time) – with Shin Suzuki

- Guts World Pro Wrestling

- GWC 6-Man Tag Team Championship (5 times) – with Dick Togo and Masao Orihara (1), Amigo Suzuki and Masao Orihara (1), Kenichiro Arai and Masked Mystery (1), Kakukari Umibozu and Devil Invader (1), and Dick Togo and Yuki Sato (1)
- GWC Six Man Tag Team Title Tournament (2016)

- Ice Ribbon

- Triangle Ribbon Championship (2 times)
- International Ribbon Tag Team Championship (1 time) – with Makoto Oishi
