= Super Asia Championship =

Wrestling championship

- The Super Asia Championship belt

Details
- Promotion: ChocoPro
- Date established: August 5, 2017
- Current champion: Emi Sakura
- Date won: September 20, 2026
Statistics
- First champion: Riho
- Most reigns: Emi Sakura (2 reigns)
- Longest reign: Riho (620 days)
- Shortest reign: Minoru Fujita (322 days)
- Oldest champion: Emi Sakura (49 years, 351 days)
- Youngest champion: Riho (20 years, 110 days)

The Super Asia Championship (Japanese: スーパーアジア王座, Hepburn: Sūpā Ajia Ōza) is a title defended in the joshi puroresu (Japanese women's professional wrestling) promotion ChocoPro. There have been a total of seven recognized reigns and two interim reigns shared between eight different wrestlers. The current champion is Emi Sakura in her second reign.

== History ==
On November 16, 2013, at an International Wrestling Association Japan (IWA Japan) house show, Gatoh Move Pro Wrestling founder Emi Sakura defeated Kyonin Shihan to unify the vacant IWA World Heavyweight Championship, the AWF World Women's Championship and the IWA World Junior Heavyweight Championship into the IWA Triple Crown Championship (IWA三冠統一王座, IWA Sankan Tōitsu Ōza). This triple crown title was then brought to Gatoh Move to serve as its main singles title.

In 2017, IWA Japan finally folded after ceasing their professional wrestling activities three years earlier. The IWA belts were then returned and Sakura announced the creation of the Super Asia Championship, a new title with a new lineage, as well as an eight-women single-elimination tournament that would crown the first champion. On September 22, at Gatoh Move's 5th Anniversary Show, Riho defeated "Kotori" in the tournament final to become the inaugural champion.

On June 4, 2019, Riho relinquished the title after her eighth defense against Mei Suruga.

On the March 22, 2021 episode of ChocoPro, Emi Sakura announced a singles match between Minoru Fujita and Baliyan Akki for the vacant Super Asia Championship which would take place on Day 2 of the 100th episode of ChocoPro on March 28. Fujita defeated Akki to win the title. On the November 6 episode of ChocoPro, a four-way match was held to crown an interim champion while Fujita was recovering from COVID-19 complications. The match saw Choun Shiryu win against Baliyan Akki, Yuna Mizumori and Masahiro Takanashi. Choun successfully defended the title three times before losing it to Akki on the January 29, 2022 episode of ChocoPro. Akki then unified the titles when he faced and defeated Fujita on Day 2 of the 200th ChocoPro episode on February 13.

=== Inaugural tournament ===
First round August 13
Sayaka Obihiro	(Note: Obihiro was forced to withdraw from the tournament due to suffering from severe headaches.)
Aoi Kizuki	Forfeit
Riho	Pin
Saki	8:12
Aasa Maika	Pin
Mitsuru Konno	8:46
Emi Sakura	11:31
"Kotori"	Pin

Semifinals; August 19 and 26
Aoi Kizuki	7:23
Riho	Pin
Aasa Maika	8:32
"Kotori"	Pin

Final; September 22
Riho	Pin
"Kotori"	12:29

== Reigns ==
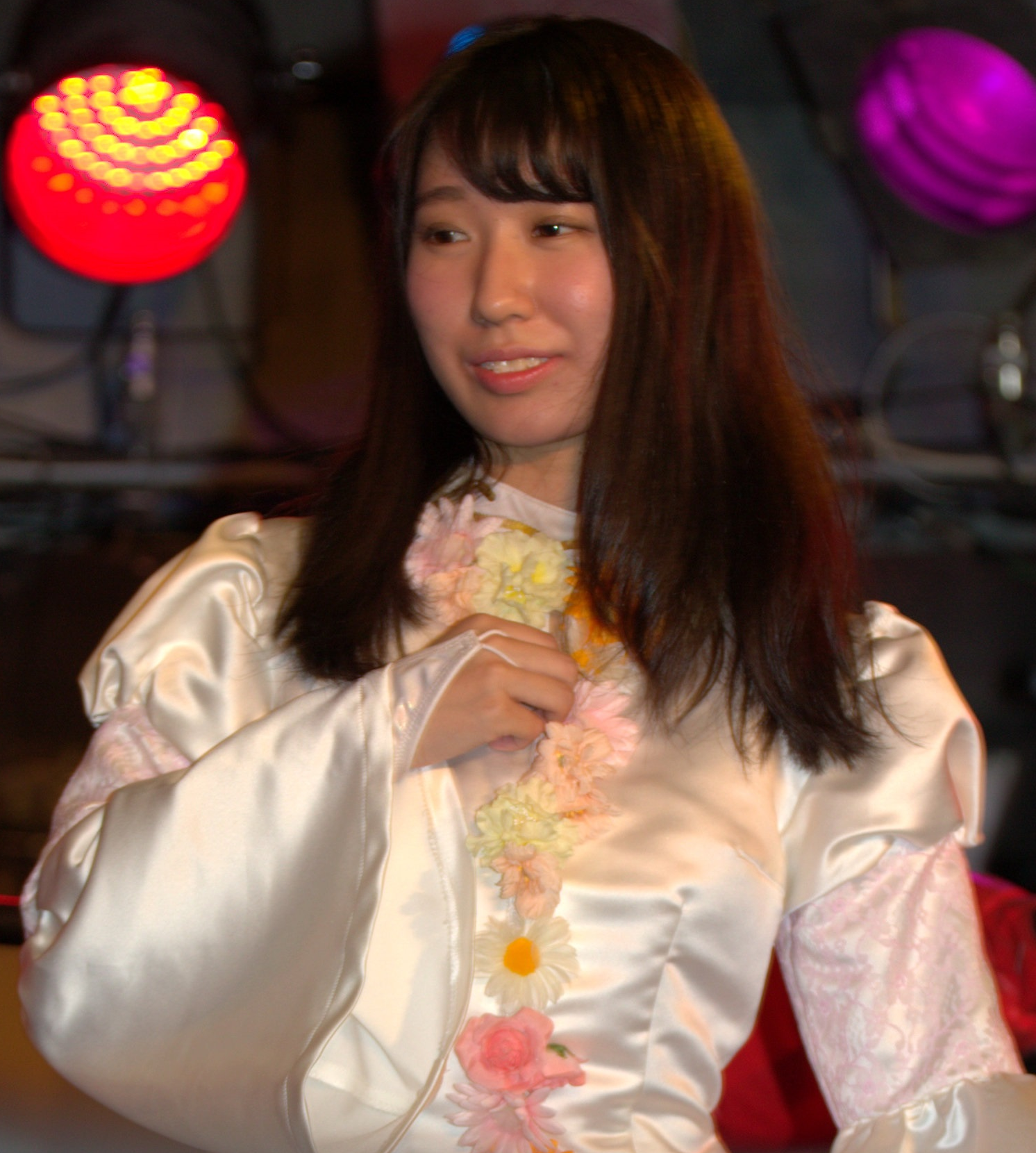
Inaugural and longest reigning champion, Riho

As of November 4, 2026, there have been a total of nine reigns shared between eight different champions, one vacancy and two interim champions. Riho was the inaugural champion. Riho's reign is the longest at 620 days, while Minoru Fujita's reign is the shortest at 322 days. Fujita is the oldest champion at 43 years old, while Riho is the youngest at 20 years old. Emi Sakura is the current champion in her second reign.

Key
No.	Overall reign number
Reign	Reign number for the specific champion
Days	Number of days held
Defenses	Number of successful defenses
+	Current reign is changing daily

No.	Champion	Championship change			Reign statistics			Notes	Ref.
No.	Champion	Date	Event	Location	Reign	Days	Defenses	Notes	Ref.
Gatoh Move Pro Wrestling
1	Riho	September 22, 2017	Gatoh Move 5th Anniversary Show	Tokyo, Japan	1	620	8	Defeated "Kotori" in the finals of an eight-woman single-elimination tournament to become the inaugural champion.	
—	Vacated	June 4, 2019	—	—	—	—	—	The championship was vacated due to Riho leaving Gatoh Move.	
2	Minoru Fujita	March 28, 2021	ChocoPro 100; Day 2	Tokyo, Japan	1	322	2	Defeated Baliyan Akki in a singles match to win the vacant championship.	
—	Choun Shiryu	November 6, 2021	ChocoPro 170	Tokyo, Japan	—	84	3	Due to Minoru Fujita being unable to defend the title after suffering from COVID-19 complications, an interim champion was crowned until Fujita could return. Choun Shiryu defeated Baliyan Akki, Yuna Mizumori and Masahiro Takanashi in a four-way match to become the interim champion.	
—	Baliyan Akki	January 29, 2022	ChocoPro 197	Tokyo, Japan	—	15	0		
3	Baliyan Akki	February 13, 2022	ChocoPro 200; Day 2	Tokyo, Japan	1	392	7	This was a Last Man Standing match against lineal champion Minoru Fujita to unify the title.	
4	Hagane Shinno	March 12, 2023	ChocoPro 300; Day 2	Tokyo, Japan	1	115	2		
5	Emi Sakura	July 5, 2023	Gatoh Move	Tokyo, Japan	1	423	2		
ChocoPro
6	Mei Suruga	August 31, 2024	Gatoh Move For The Future	Tokyo, Japan	1	370	9		
7	Rina Yamashita	September 5, 2025	ChocoPro 472	Tokyo, Japan	1	199	4		
8	Miya Yotsuba	March 23, 2026	ChocoPro 511	Tokyo, Japan	1	181	7		
9	Emi Sakura	September 20, 2026	ChocoPro 545	Tokyo, Japan	2	45+	1		

== Combined reigns ==
As of November 4, 2026.

†	Indicates the current champion

Rank	Wrestler	No. of reigns	Combined defenses	Combined days	Combined days rec.
1	Riho	1	8	620	
2	Emi Sakura †	2	3	468+	
3	Baliyan Akki	1^{(2)}	7	407	392
4	Mei Suruga	1	9	370	
5	Minoru Fujita	1	2	322	
6	Rina Yamashita	1	4	199	
7	Miya Yotsuba	1	7	181	
8	Hagane Shinno	1	2	115	
—	Choun Shiryu	—	3	84	
