= ChocoPro =

Women's professional wrestling promotion

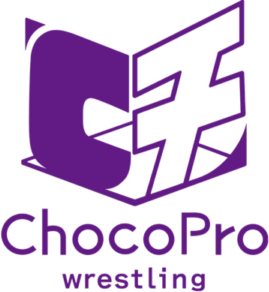
- ChocoPro logo used since August 2024
- Founded: February 2012 (Thailand); May 2012 (Japan)
- Style: Joshi puroresu
- Headquarters: Bangkok, Thailand; Tokyo, Japan
- Founders: Emi Sakura; Prachapoom "Pumi" Boonyatud
- Owner: Emi Sakura
- Formerly: Bangkok Girls Pro Wrestling (2012); Gatoh Move Pro Wrestling (2012–2024)
- Split from: Ice Ribbon
- Website: chocoprowrestling.com

ChocoPro (Japanese: チョコプロ レスリング, Hepburn: Choko Puro Resuringu), first established as Bangkok Girls Pro Wrestling (BKK Pro), is a Thai-Japanese joshi puroresu (women's professional wrestling) promotion founded in 2012 by Emi Sakura and Prachapoom "Pumi" Boonyatud. The promotion is known for hosting shows in Tokyo at Ichigaya Chocolate Square, where there is no wrestling ring, but instead a small performing space in the shape of a square. From May 2012 until August 2024, the promotion was known as Gatoh Move Pro Wrestling (Japanese: プロレスリング我闘雲舞(ガトームーブ), Hepburn: Puroresuringu Gatōmūbu; Thai: กาโตห์ มูฟ).

The promotion's previous Japanese language name Gatōmūbu (我闘雲舞, "I, War, Cloud, Dance") written as a yojijukugo, is derived from the Japanese expression "We want to dance above the clouds" (私たちは雲よりも高く舞いたい, Watashitachi wa kumo yori mo takaku maitai), while also evoking the French word "gâteau" (French for "cake") and the English word "move".

== History ==
=== Early history (2012–2019) ===
The logo of Bangkok Girls Pro Wrestling

On January 7, 2012, Emi Sakura, founder of Ice Ribbon, departed the promotion and traveled to Thailand. While in Thailand, Emi Sakura met Prachapoom "Pumi" Boonyatud, a long-time wrestling fan. By meeting Boonyatud, Sakura learned that there were many fans of professional wrestling in Thailand, which led to the two creating Gatoh Move Pro Wrestling (Gatoh Move) in February 2012. Originally, the promotion was named Bangkok Girls Pro Wrestling (BKK Pro), but was re-branded as Gatoh Move in May 2012.

In March 2016, Gatoh Move introduced their first non-IWA Japan branded championship, the Asia Dream Tag Team Championship, with Mizuki and Saki being crowned the inaugural champions on March 26. There have been ten tag team champions since 2016, with Calamari Drunken Kings (Chris Brookes and Masahiro Takanashi) being the current titleholders. On September 22, 2017, Gatoh Move crowned their first Super Asia Champion, when Riho defeated "Kotori" in the finals of a tournament to become the inaugural champion. Riho left Gatoh Move in June 2019, while reigning as the inaugural Super Asia Champion. This left the championship vacant until a new champion was crowned in 2021.

In November 2019, Gatoh Move held its final show in Thailand, while still remaining active in Japan.

=== Launch of ChocoPro and name change (2020–present) ===
In response to the COVID-19 pandemic lockdowns in Japan, Gatoh Move began airing a YouTube exclusive show, ChocoPro, on March 29, 2020, with Minoru Suzuki wrestling against Baliyan Akki in the main event of the inaugural episode.

In February 2021, Emi Sakura and Mei Suruga represented Gatoh Move in the Women's World Championship Eliminator Tournament for All Elite Wrestling (AEW), however, neither managed to win the tournament. On March 22, 2021, the Super Asia Championship was revived during the 99th episode of ChocoPro, where a championship match between Minoru Fujita and Baliyan Akki was announced for day 2 of the 100th Show Anniversary of ChocoPro on March 28. At ChocoPro 100 day 2, Fujita won the title.

On August 31, 2024, during the For The Future event, Emi Sakura announced that Gatoh Move would be renamed to ChocoPro, adopting the name of the promotion's YouTube program.

== Roster ==
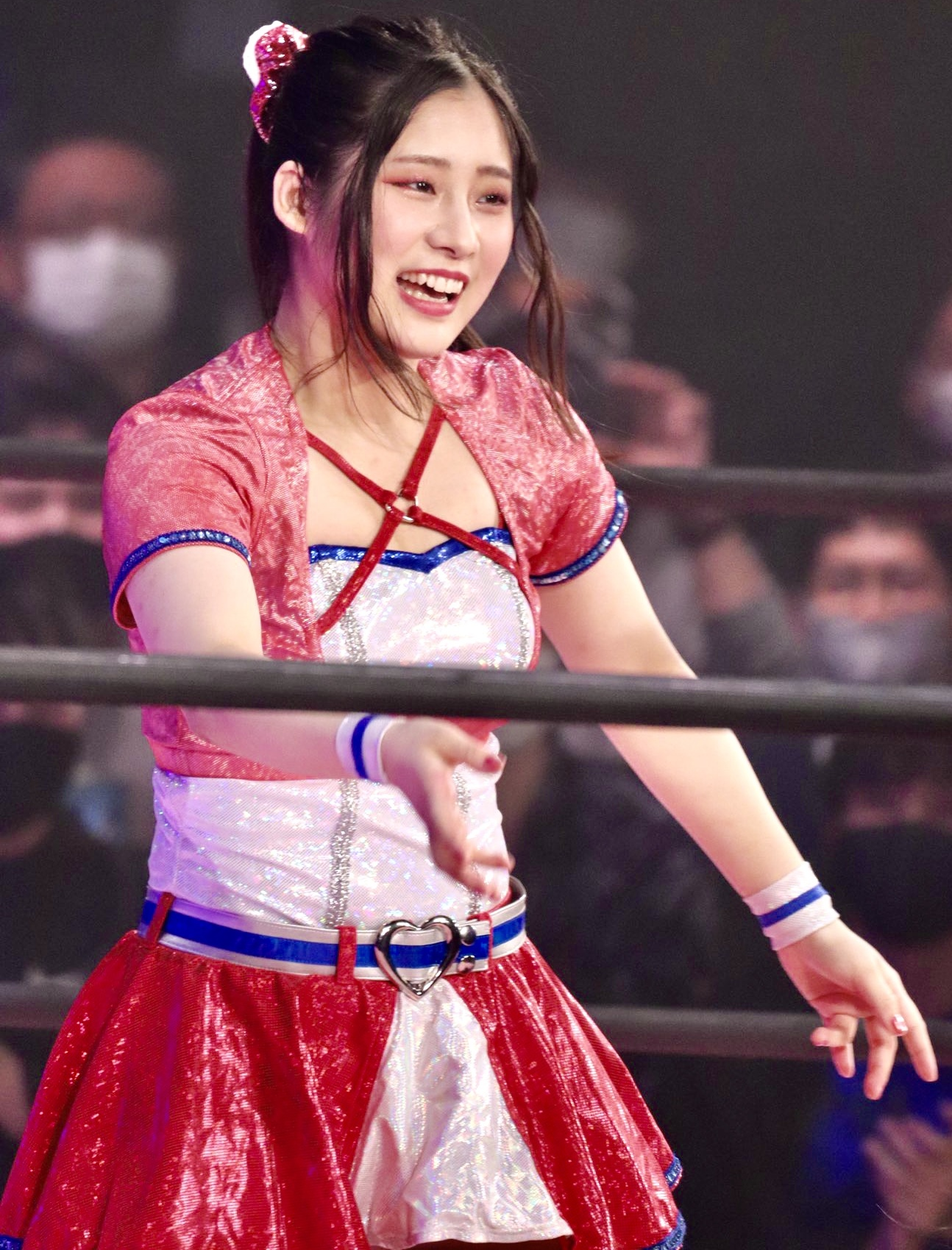
Mei Suruga

=== Current wrestlers ===
| Ring name | Real name | Notes |
|---|---|---|
| Antonio Honda | Soichiro Honda | Signed to DDT Pro-Wrestling |
| Aoi Kizuki | Unknown | General Manager (Former wrestler, retired 2018) |
| Baliyan Akki | Ankur Baliyan | |
| Chie Koishikawa | Unknown | Asia Dream Tag Team Champion |
| Choun Shiryu | Unknown | |
| Chris Brookes | Chris Brookes | Signed to DDT Pro-Wrestling |
| Emi Sakura | Emi Motokawa | Founder/owner of ChocoPro; Signed to All Elite Wrestling |
| Erii Kanae | Unknown | |
| Hagane Shinno | Yuki Yagi | |
| Kaho Hiromi | Unknown | |
| Masahiro Takanashi | Masahiro Takanashi | Signed to DDT Pro-Wrestling |
| Mei Suruga | Unknown | DPW Women's Worlds Champion |
| Minoru Fujita | Unknown | |
| Miya Yotsuba | Unknown | Super Asia Champion |
| Mizuki | Mizuki Kaminade | Signed to Tokyo Joshi Pro-Wrestling |
| Rina Yamashita | Rina Yamashita | Freelancer |
| Saki | Saki Watanabe | Freelancer |
| Sayaka | Unknown | Asia Dream Tag Team Champion |
| Sayaka Obihiro | Unknown | |
| Shin Suzuki | Kokoro Suzuki | |
| Soy | Unknown | Affiliated with Pro Wrestling Evolution |
| Tokiko Kirihara | Unknown | |

=== Alumni ===
| Ring name | Real name | Notes |
|---|---|---|
| Ancham | Unknown | |
| Hanako Nakamori | Hanako Kobayashi | |
| Hiyori Yawata | Unknown | Left ChocoPro on March 24, 2026 |
| Kotori | Unknown | |
| Lulu Pencil | Syuka Yamada | Inactive since August 8, 2021 |
| Mitsuru Konno | Unknown | Left Gatoh Move on January 29, 2021 |
| Mizuki | Unknown | |
| Nonoka Seto | Unknown | Left ChocoPro on September 20, 2026 |
| Riho | Unknown | Left Gatoh Move in June 2019 |
| Rin Rin | Unknown | Left Gatoh Move on July 20, 2021 |
| Saki | Saki Watanabe | |
| Sayuri | Unknown | Left Gatoh Move on December 30, 2023 |
| Waka Tsukiyama | Unknown | |
| Yuna Mizumori | Unknown | Left Gatoh Move on September 29, 2022 |

== Championships ==
=== Current ===
As of November 4, 2026:

| Championship | Current champion(s) | Reign | Date won | Days held | Location | Notes |
|---|---|---|---|---|---|---|
| Super Asia Championship | Emi Sakura | 2 | September 20, 2026 | 45+ | Tokyo, Japan | Defeated Miya Yotsuba at Choco Pro Phoenix Rises |
| Asia Dream Tag Team Championship | Obihiro Shokudo Main Store (Minoru Fujita and Sayaka Obihiro) | 1 (1, 3) | June 25, 2026 | 132+ | Tokyo, Japan | Defeated Orange Panna Cotta (Chie Koishikawa and Sayaka]) at Choco Pro 531. |

=== Retired ===
| Championship | Last champion(s) | Reign | Date retired | Notes |
|---|---|---|---|---|
| IWA Triple Crown Championship | Emi Sakura | 4 | August 5, 2017 | Deactivated when Sakura returned the championship to IWA Japan. |

== Tournaments ==
| Tournament | Last winner | Last held | Type | Notes |
|---|---|---|---|---|
| Gatoh Rhapsody | Lion Dance (Leon and Choun Shiryu) | February 2, 2025 | Tag Team | Defeated BestBros (Mei Suruga and Baliyan Akki) in the finals. |
| One Of A Kind Tag League | Saki and Yuna Mizumori | July 17, 2021 | Tag Team | Defeated Melt Brain Dancing (Chango and Psycho) in the finals. |
| Go Go! Green Curry Khob Khun Cup | Hyakkin Thunders (Emi Sakura and Masa Takanashi) | Feb 12, 2024 | Tag Team | Defeated Kung Fu Panda (Choun Shiryu and Lee Yoneyamakao) in the finals. |
