= Spark Joshi Atlantic Championship =

Professional wrestling women's championship

Details
- Promotion: Spark Joshi Puroresu of America
- Date established: October 14, 2023
- Current champion: Saki
- Date won: October 14, 2023
Statistics
- First champion: Saki
- Most reigns: All titleholders (1 time)

The Spark Joshi Atlantic Championship is a women's professional wrestling championship owned by the Spark Joshi Puroresu of America promotion. The title was introduced on October 14, 2023, when Saki became the inaugural champion by defeating Maya Yukihi in a decision match.

== History ==
On October 14, 2023, during Spark Joshi's fourth event Rising Heat East, Saki defeated Maya Yukihi to become the inaugural champion.

== Reigns ==
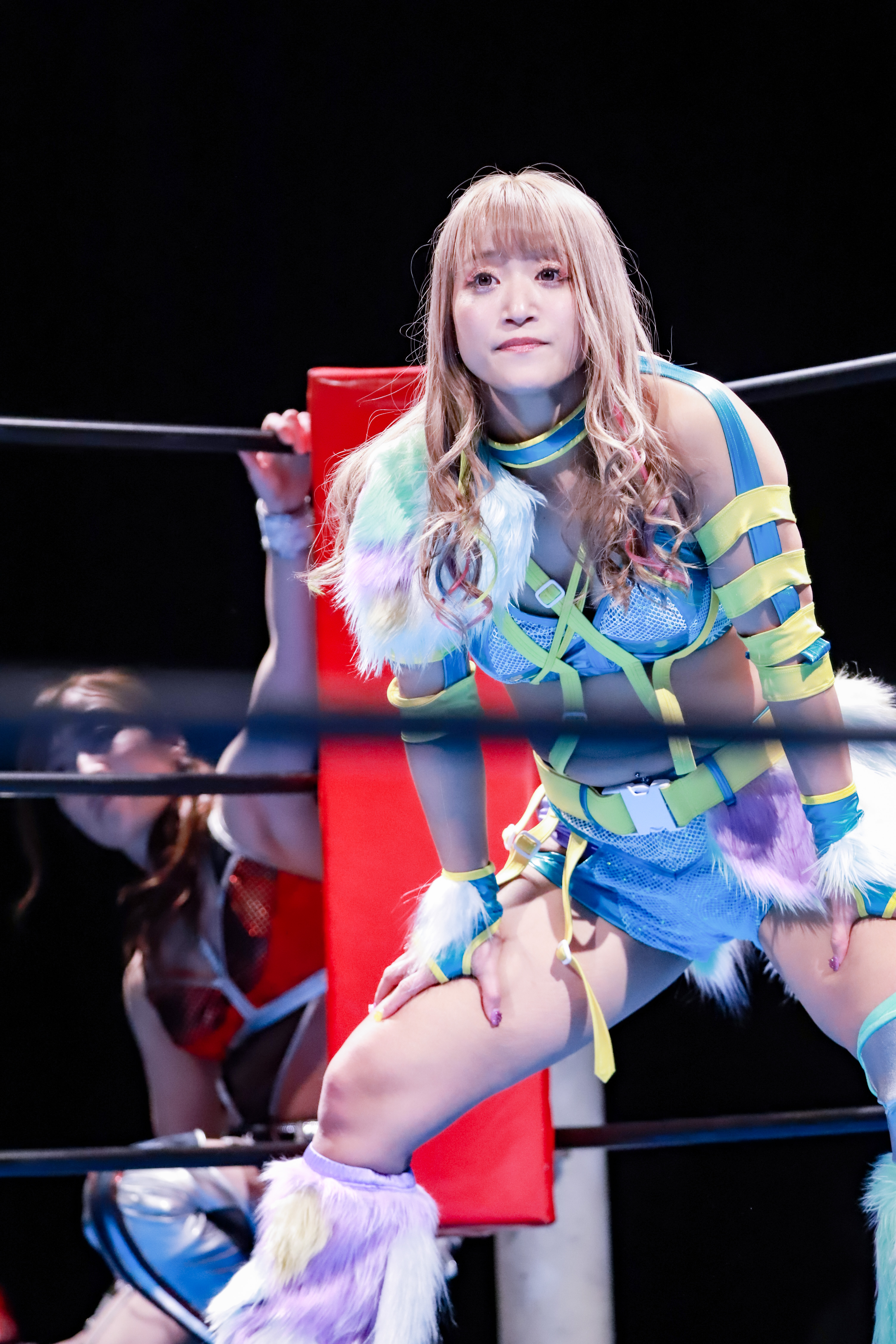
Current and inaugural champion Saki

As of April 19, 2026, there has been only one champion as the current and inaugural champion being Saki, after defeating Maya Yukihi at Rising Heat East on October 14, 2023, in Orlando, Florida.

Key
No.	Overall reign number
Reign	Reign number for the specific champion
Days	Number of days held
Defenses	Number of successful defenses
+	Current reign is changing daily

No.	Champion	Championship change			Reign statistics			Notes	Ref.
No.	Champion	Date	Event	Location	Reign	Days	Defenses	Notes	Ref.
1	Saki	October 14, 2023	Rising Heat East	Orlando, FL	1	918+	4	Defeated Maya Yukihi in a decision match to become the inaugural champion.	
