= Asia Dream Tag Team Championship =

Asian professional wrestling tag team championship

- One of the Asia Dream Tag Team Championship belts

Details
- Promotion: ChocoPro
- Date established: March 24, 2016
- Current champions: Obihiro Shokudo Main Store (Minoru Fujita and Sayaka Obihiro)
- Date won: June 25, 2026
Statistics
- First champions: Buribato (Mizuki and Saki)
- Most reigns: As a team (2 reigns): Tropikawild (Saki and Yuna Mizumori); BestBros (Baliyan Akki and Mei Suruga); Hyakkin Thunders (Emi Sakura and Masahiro Takanashi); Buribato (Mizuki and Saki); As an individual (4 reigns): Saki
- Longest reign: Hyakkin Thunders (Emi Sakura and Masahiro Takanashi) (511 days)
- Shortest reign: Buribato (Mizuki and Saki) (31 days)
- Oldest champion: Tokiko Kirihara (50 years, 56 days)
- Youngest champion: Kotori (18 years, 120 days)
- Heaviest champion: Chris Brookes (191 lbs)
- Lightest champion: Mizuki (88 lbs)

The Asia Dream Tag Team Championship (Japanese: アジアドリームタッグ王座, Hepburn: Ajia Dorīmu Taggu Ōza) is a professional wrestling tag team championship owned by the Joshi puroresu (women's professional wrestling) promotion ChocoPro. Though Gatoh Move is a joshi puroresu promotion, this title has no gender restriction. Like most professional wrestling championships, the title is won via the result of a scripted match.

== Title history ==
As of November 4, 2026, there have been a total of 20 reigns shared between ffifteen teams composed of 22 individual champions. Buribato (Mizuki and Saki) were the inaugural champions. Tropikawild (Saki and Yuna Mizumori) holds the record for most reigns at two, while individually, Saki has the most reigns at three. Emi Sakura and Masahiro Takanashi's first reign is the longest at 511 days, and they also hold the record for the shortest reign with their second one at 62 days.

Minoru Fujita and Sayaka Obihiro are the current champions in their first reign as a team. They won the titles by defeating Chie Koishikawa and Sayaka at ChocoPro #531 on June 25, 2026, in Tokyo, Japan.

Key
No.	Overall reign number
Reign	Reign number for the specific team—reign numbers for the individuals are in parentheses, if different
Days	Number of days held
Defenses	Number of successful defenses
+	Current reign is changing daily

No.	Champion	Championship change			Reign statistics			Notes	Ref.
No.	Champion	Date	Event	Location	Reign	Days	Defenses	Notes	Ref.
Gatoh Move Pro Wrestling
1	Buribato (Note: ブリバト♡, Buribato) (Saki and Mizuki)	March 24, 2016	Japan Tour 219: It's High School Graduation	Tokyo, Japan	1	90	1	Defeated Emi Sakura and Masa Takanashi to become the inaugural champions.	
2	Aoi Kizuki and Sayaka Obihiro	June 22, 2016	Japan Tour 233: Gatoh Move in Korakuen Hall 2016 – Riho 10th Anniversary	Tokyo, Japan	1	185	2		
3	Kotoriho (Note: ことりほ, Kotoriho) (Riho and "Kotori")	December 24, 2016	Japan Tour 264: Christmas Eve	Tokyo, Japan	1	94	1		
4	Hyakkin Thunders (Note: 百均サンダーズ, Hyakkin Sandāzu) (Emi Sakura and Masahiro Takanashi)	March 28, 2017	Japan Tour 281: It's High School Graduation	Tokyo, Japan	1	511	5		
5	Tropikawild (Note: トロピカワイルド, Toropikawairudo) (Saki and Yuna Mizumori)	August 21, 2018	Japan Tour 374: Where to Go for Summer Vacation?	Tokyo, Japan	1 (2, 1)	112	0		
6	Riho and Makoto	December 11, 2018	Japan Tour 396	Tokyo, Japan	1 (2, 1)	101	0		
7	Tropikawild (Saki and Yuna Mizumori)	March 22, 2019	Japan Tour 416: The Last Heisei Shin-kiba Gatoh	Tokyo, Japan	2 (3, 2)	364	4		
8	Reset (Emi Sakura and Kaori Yoneyama)	March 20, 2020	Gtmv 41: Day of Happiness	Tokyo, Japan	1 (2, 1)	286	0		
9	BestBros (Mei Suruga and Baliyan Akki)	December 31, 2020	ChocoPro 76	Tokyo, Japan	1	422	11		
10	Calamari Drunken Kings (Masahiro Takanashi and Chris Brookes	February 26, 2022	ChocoPro 204	Tokyo, Japan	1 (2, 1)	457	8		
11	Shin Dragon (Note: シン・ドラゴン, Shin Doragon) (Shin Suzuki and Choun Shiryu)	May 29, 2023	Mei Suruga Debut 5th Anniversary: Under the Big Apple Tree	Tokyo, Japan	1	123	2		
—	Vacated	September 29, 2023	—	—	—	—	—	Title vacated due to Shin Suzuki suffering an injury.	
12	BestBros (Mei Suruga and Baliyan Akki)	October 16, 2023	Back To New	Tokyo, Japan	2	227	2	Defeated Hagane Shinno and Kaori Yoneyama to win the vacant titles.	
13	Hyakkin Thunders (Emi Sakura and Masahiro Takanashi)	May 30, 2024	Road To Korakuen: Apple Ambitious	Tokyo, Japan	2 (3, 3)	62	0		
14	Buribato (Note: ブリバト♡, Buribato) (Saki and Mizuki)	July 31, 2024	Road To Korakuen - Final Countdown	Tokyo, Japan	2 (3, 4)	31	0		
ChocoPro
15	Popcorn Carnival (Chie Koishikawa and Sayaka Obihiro)	August 31, 2024	Gatoh Move For The Future	Tokyo, Japan	1 (1, 2)	121	3		
16	Black Komanechi (Antonio Honda and Tokiko Kirihara)	December 30, 2024	ChocoPro 416	Tokyo, Japan	1 (1, 1)	91	1		
17	Bellflowers (Makoto and Sayaka)	March 31, 2025	ChocoPro 438	Tokyo, Japan	1 (2, 1)	242	4		
18	MiyaSoy (Miya Yotsuba and Soy)	November 28, 2025	ChocoPro 491	Tokyo, Japan	1 (1, 1)	32	0		
19	Egg Tart (Chie Koishikawa and Hagane Shinno)	December 30, 2025	ChocoPro 496	Tokyo, Japan	1 (2, 1)	83	1		
—	Vacated	March 23, 2026	ChocoPro 511	Tokyo, Japan	—	—	—	The titles were vacated due to Shinnou suffering an injury.	
20	Orange Panna Cotta (Chie Koishikawa and Sayaka)	March 23, 2026	ChocoPro 511	Tokyo, Japan	1 (3, 2)	94	0	Defeated Choun Shiryu and Lee Yoneyamakao, and Minoru Fujita and Sayaka Obihiro in a three-way tag team match to win the vacant titles.	
21	Obihiro Shokudo Main Store (Minoru Fujita and Sayaka Obihiro)	June 25, 2026	ChocoPro 531	Tokyo, Japan	1 (1, 3)	132+	4		

== Combined reigns ==
†	Indicates the current champion

=== By team ===
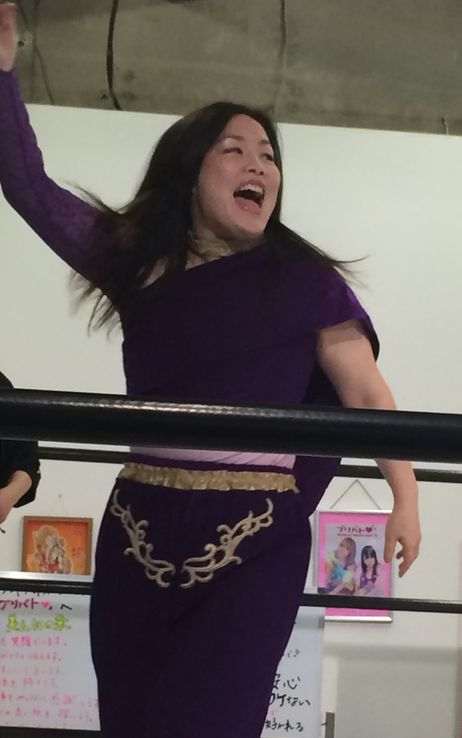
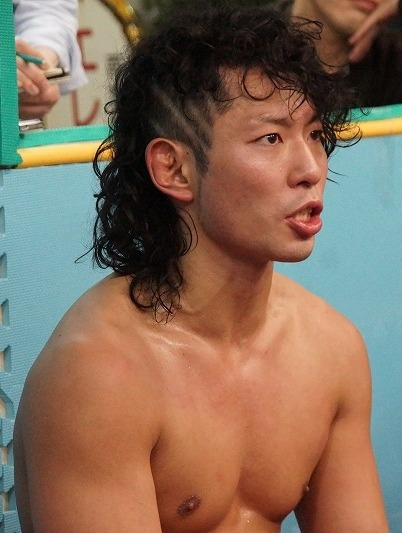
Two-time, longest reigning (with 511 days) and shortest reigning (with 62 days) champions, Hyakkin Thunders (Emi Sakura and Masahiro Takanashi).

Rank	Team	No. of reigns	Combined defenses	Combined days
1	BestBros (Baliyan Akki and Mei Suruga)	2	13	649
2	Hyakkin Thunders (Emi Sakura and Masahiro Takanashi)	2	5	573
3	Tropikawild (Saki and Yuna Mizumori)	2	4	476
4	Calamari Drunken Kings (Chris Brookes and Masahiro Takanashi)	1	8	457
5	Reset (Emi Sakura and Kaori Yoneyama)	1	0	286
6	Bellflowers (Makoto and Sayaka)	1	4	242
7	Aoi Kizuki and Sayaka Obihiro	1	2	185
8	Shin Dragon (Choun Shiryu and Shin Suzuki)	1	2	123
9	Buribato (Mizuki and Saki)	2	1	121
9	Popcorn Carnival (Chie Koishikawa and Sayaka Obihiro)	1	3	121
11	Obihiro Shokudo Main Store † (Minoru Fujita and Sayaka Obihiro)	1	4	132+
12	Makoto and Riho	1	0	101
13	Kotoriho (Kotori and Riho)	1	1	94
13	Orange Panna Cotta (Chie Koishikawa and Sayaka)	1	0	94
15	Black Komanechi (Antonio Honda and Tokiko Kirihara)	1	1	91
16	Egg Tart (Chie Koishikawa and Hagane Shinno)	1	1	83
17	MiyaSoy (Miya Yotsuba and Soy)	1	0	32

=== By wrestler ===
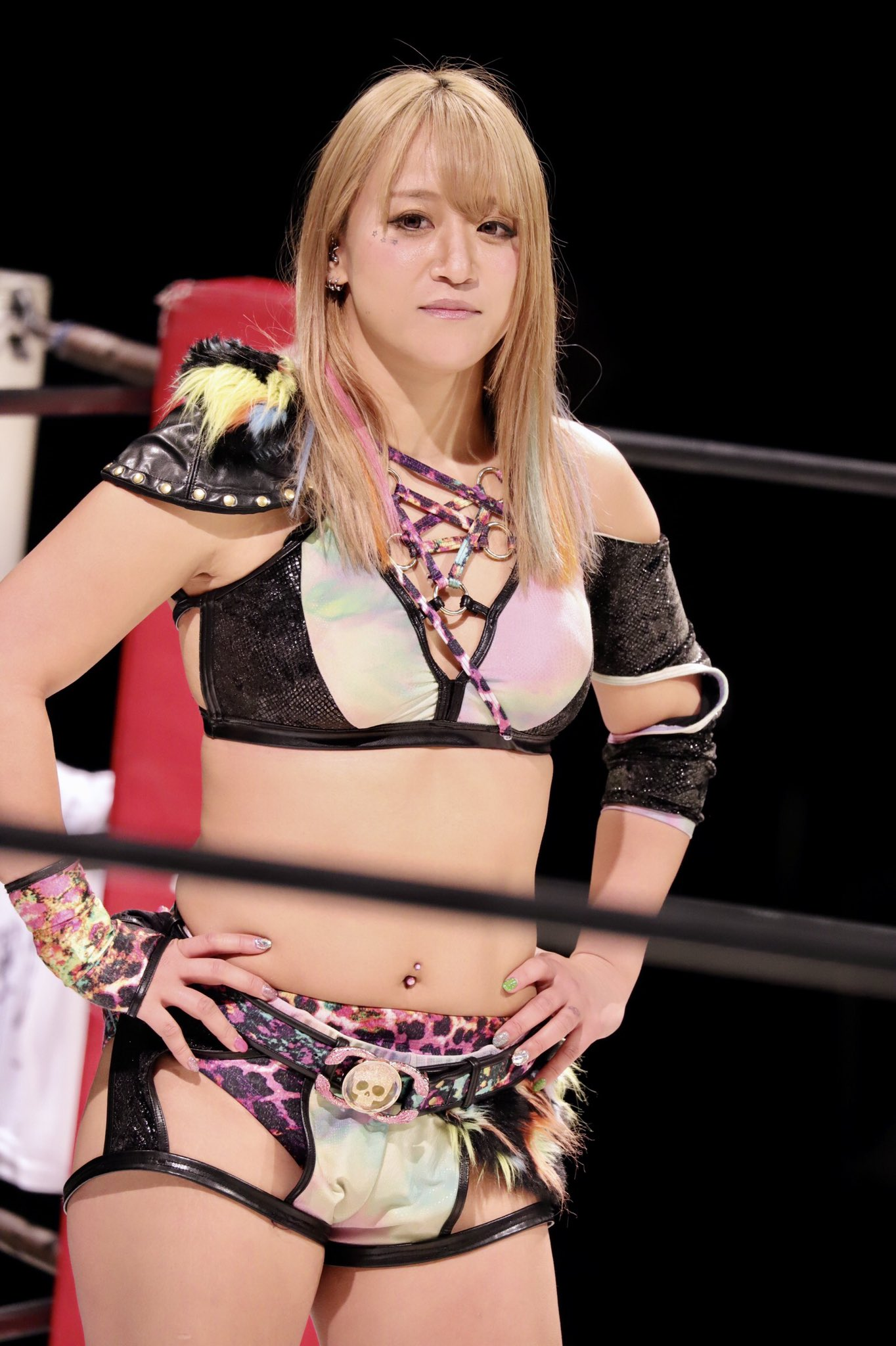
Saki, record four-time champion as an individual.

Rank	Wrestler	No. of reigns	Combined defenses	Combined days
1	Masahiro Takanashi	3	13	1,030
2	Emi Sakura	3	5	859
3	Baliyan Akki	2	13	649
3	Mei Suruga	2	13	649
5	Saki	4	5	597
6	Yuna Mizumori	2	4	476
7	Chris Brookes	1	8	457
8	Sayaka Obihiro †	3	9	438+
9	Makoto	2	4	343
10	Sayaka	2	4	336
11	Chie Koishikawa	3	4	298
12	Kaori Yoneyama	1	0	286
13	Riho	2	1	195
14	Aoi Kizuki	1	2	185
15	Choun Shiryu	1	2	123
15	Shin Suzuki	1	2	123
17	Mizuki	2	1	121
18	Minoru Fujita †	1	4	132+
19	Kotori	1	1	94
20	Antonio Honda	1	1	91
20	Tokiko Kirihra	1	1	91
22	Hagane Shinno	1	1	83
23	Miya Yotsuba	1	0	32
23	Soy	1	0	32
