= Saki (wrestler) =

Japanese professional wrestler

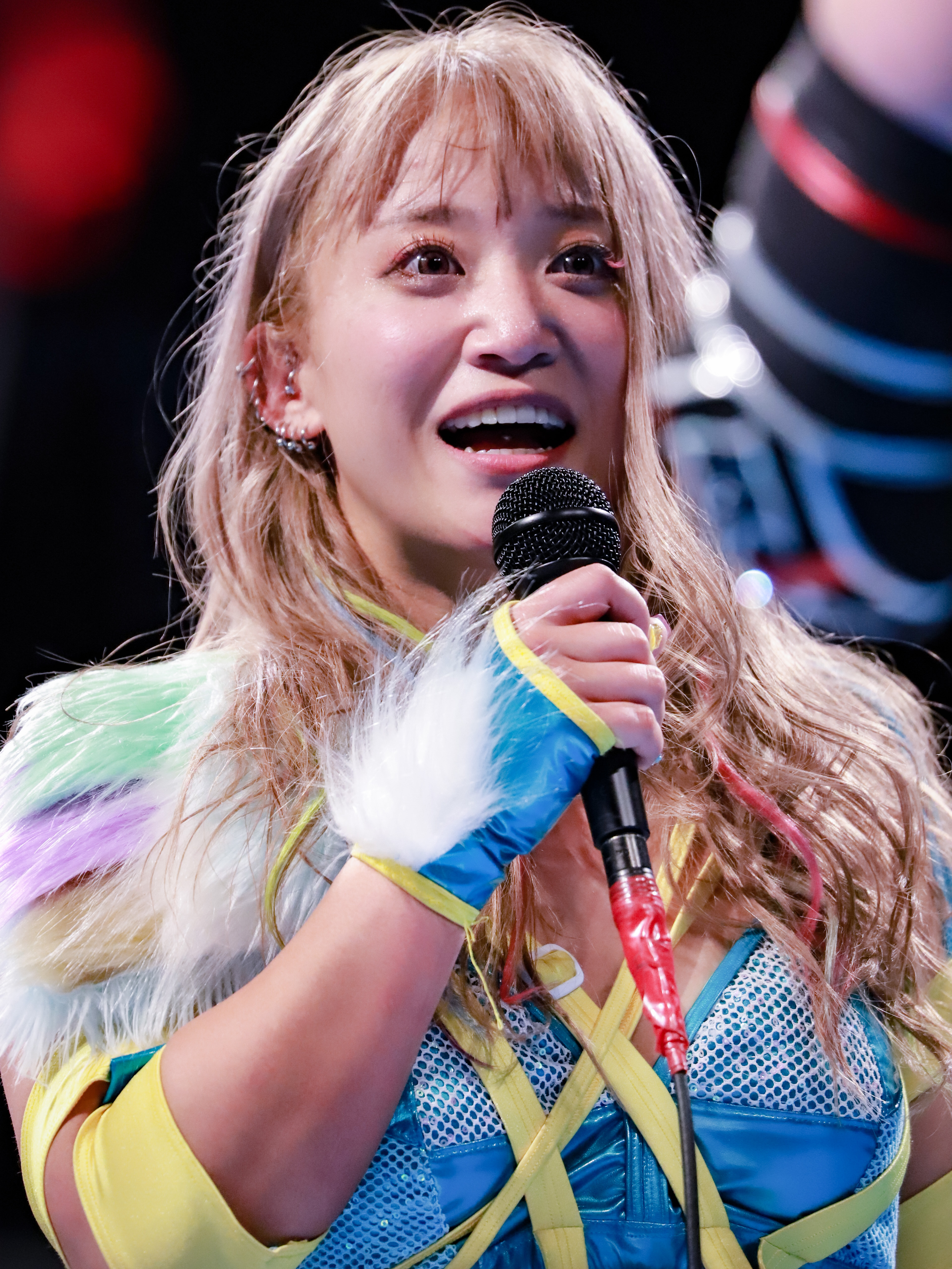
- Saki in February 2022

Personal information
- Born: February 12, 1988 (age 38) Kisarazu, Japan

Professional wrestling career
- Ring name(s): Saki; Saki Bimi
- Billed height: 163 cm (5 ft 4 in)
- Billed weight: 58 kg (128 lb)
- Trained by: Tomoka Nakagawa; Takako Inoue; Emi Sakura
- Debut: 2012

Saki Watanabe (渡邊沙紀, Watanabe Saki; born February 12, 1988), mononymously known by her ring name Saki (often stylized in capital letters as SAKI) is a Japanese professional wrestler currently working as a freelancer and is best known for her tenure with the Japanese promotions Gatoh Move Pro Wrestling and Pro Wrestling Wave.

== Professional wrestling career ==
=== Independent circuit (2012–present) ===
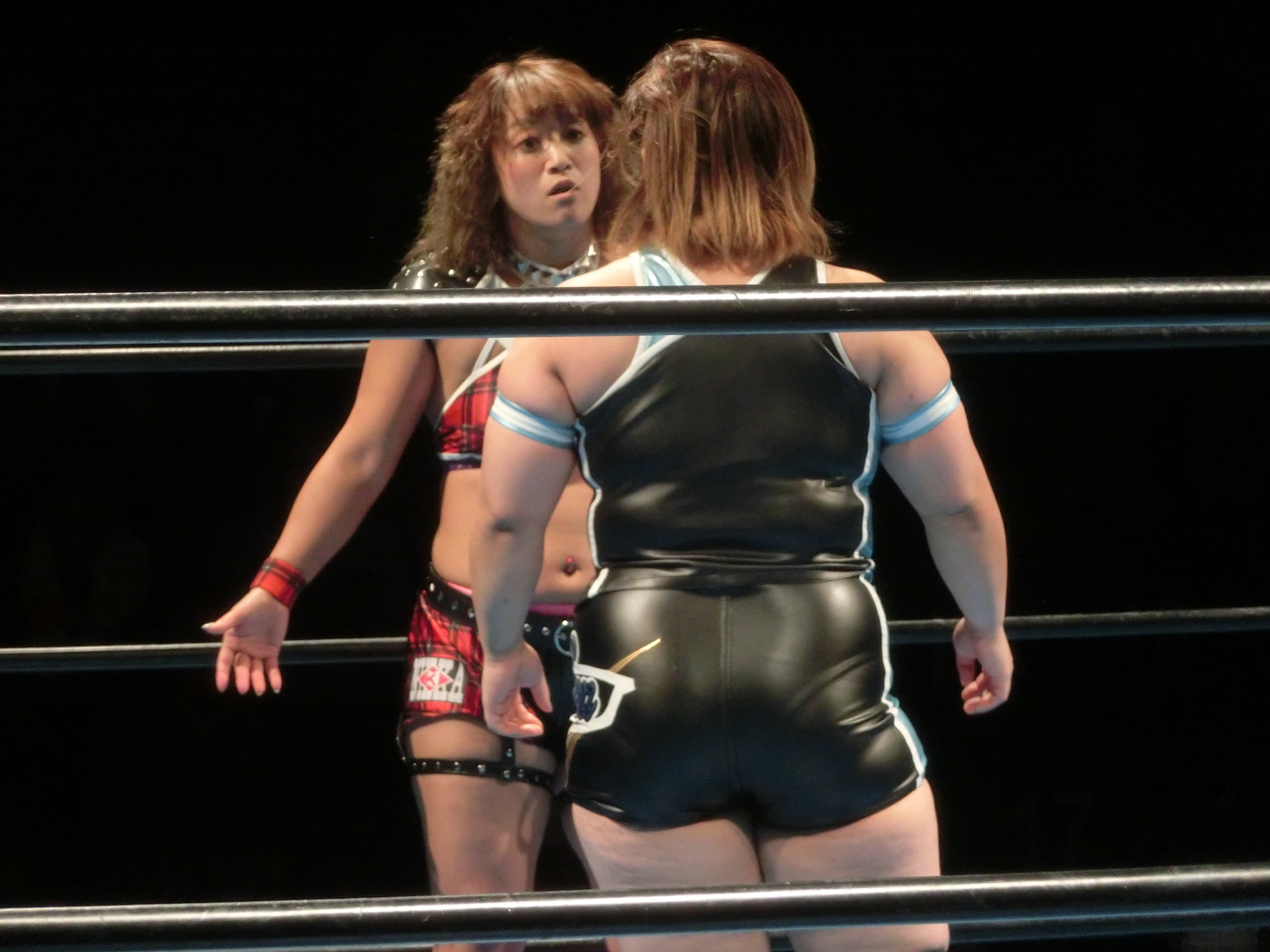
Saki (left) facing Yuu in May 2019.

Watanabe made her professional wrestling debut at LLPW-X, an event promoted by Ladies Legend Pro-Wrestling on December 29, 2012, where she teamed up with Mizuki in a losing effort to Shinobu Kandori and Takako Inoue in a tag team match.

As a freelancer, she is known for working with various promotions. At Ice Ribbon New Ice Ribbon #700 Neko Nitta Retirement, an event promoted by Ice Ribbon on December 31, 2015, Watanabe teamed up with Mizuki in a losing effort to Azure Revolution (Maya Yukihi and Risa Sera). At PURE-J/Bolshoi Kid 27th Anniversary, an event promoted by Pure-J on November 25, 2018, she participated in a Daily Sports Women's Tag Team Championship no.1 contendership league by teaming up with Manami Katsu and falling short to Wanted (Kazuki and Rydeen Hagane). At DDT Shuten Doji 5th Anniversary, an event promoted by DDT Pro Wrestling on April 17, 2019, she teamed up with Ryuichi Sekine and competed in a tag team gauntlet match also involving The Brahman Brothers (Brahman Kei and Brahman Shu), Disaster Box (Kazuki Hirata and Toru Owashi), Antonio Honda and Yasu Urano, Danshoku Dino and Kappa Kozo, Emi Sakura and Riho, Gorgeous Matsuno and Sanshiro Takagi, and Hoshihebi and Poison Sawada Julie.

=== Gatoh Move Pro Wrestling (2013–present) ===
Watanabe is known for her long tenure with Gatoh Move Pro Wrestling. At Gatoh Move Japan Tour #347 on March 31, 2018, she unsuccessfully challenged Riho for the Super Asia Championship. She is a former Asia Dream Tag Team Champion, title which she held three times with Yuna Mizumori and Mizuki, winning it for the last time at Gatoh Move Japan Tour #416 on March 22, 2019.

=== Pro Wrestling Wave (2013–present) ===
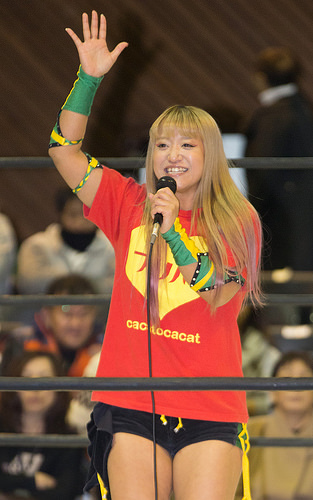
Saki in December 2015

Watanabe worked for Pro Wrestling Wave since early 2013. At WAVE NAMI 1, the first event of 2021 from January 1, she competed in an 11-woman battle royal also involving Kaori Yoneyama, Rin Kadokura, Yuki Miyazaki, Yumi Ohka and others. At WAVE Osaka Rhapsody Vol. 36 from January 13, 2018, Watanabe competed in a 16-woman battle royal to determine the no.1 contender for the Wave Single Championship also involving notable opponents such as the winner of the match Misaki Ohata, Manami Katsu, Ryo Mizunami, Ayako Hamada, Asuka and others.

She is known for competing in various signature events of the promotion such as Catch the Wave, making her first appearance at the 2017 edition where she placed herself in the "Other Than" Block, scoring a total of five points after competing against Sareee, Rin Kadokura and Mochi Miyagi. Her last appearance was at the 2021 edition, placing herself in the "Gatling Block" and scoring a total of three points after competing against Nagisa Nozaki, Yuu and Itsuki Aoki.

As for the Dual Shock Wave tournament, Saki made an appearance at the 2017 edition of the event where she teamed up with Sakura Hirota as Pyonzu Zu and fell short to Natsu & Natsuri (Natsumi Maki and Sumire Natsu) in a tables, ladders and chairs first-round match.

=== World Wonder Ring Stardom (2022–present) ===
At Stardom New Blood 2 on May 13, 2022, after Saki's Color's unit stablemates Rina Amikura and Yuko Sakurai picked up a win over Stars members Saya Iida and Momo Kohgo, Tam Nakano rushed to the ring to confront the rest of the Color's members, They set a six-man tag team match for a show on June 5. At Stardom in Korakuen Hall on June 5, 2022, Saki teamed up with her Color's stablemates Hikari Shimizu and Yuko Sakurai to fall short to Cosmic Angels' Unagi Sayaka, Tam Nakano and Mina Shirakawa in a loser joins enemy unit. Subsequently, Saki with Shimizu and Sakurai joined Cosmic Angels and announced that they will compete as a sub-unit in the future. At Mid Summer Champions in Tokyo, the first event of the Stardom Mid Summer Champions series which took place on July 9, 2022, Saki teamed up with Tam Nakano, Unagi Sayaka, Mina Shirakawa and Hikari Shimizu to defeat Donna Del Mondo (Giulia, Maika, Himeka, Natsupoi and Mai Sakurai) in a 10-woman elimination tag team match. At Mid Summer Champions in Nagoya on July 24, Saki unsuccessfully challenged Saya Kamitani for the Wonder of Stardom Championship. At Stardom 5 Star Grand Prix 2022, she fought in the "Red Goddess" block, scoring a total of 10 points after competing against Tam Nakano, Himeka, Maika, Risa Sera, AZM, Utami Hayashishita, Koguma, Syuri, Saki Kashima, Mai Sakurai, Momo Kohgo and Unagi Sayaka. At Stardom x Stardom: Nagoya Midsummer Encounter on August 21, 2022, Saki teamed up with Mina Shirakawa and Unagi Sayaka to unsuccessfully challenge Oedo Tai (Saki Kashima, Momo Watanabe and Starlight Kid) for the Artist of Stardom Championship. At Stardom in Showcase vol.2 on September 25, 2022, Saki teamed up with Hikari Shimizu and fought Tam Nakano and Natsupoi, and Mina Shirakawa and Unagi Sayaka in a Cosmic Rule Three-Way Match.

== Championships and accomplishments ==
- Actwres girl'Z
  - AWG Single Championship (1 time)
  - Color’s Championship (3 times, current)
- DDT Pro-Wrestling
  - Ironman Heavymetalweight Championship (1 time)
- Gatoh Move Pro Wrestling
  - Asia Dream Tag Team Championship (4 times, inaugural) – with Yuna Mizumori (2) and Mizuki (2)
  - One of a Kind Tag League (2021) – with Yuna Mizumori
- Ice Ribbon
  - International Ribbon Tag Team Championship (1 time) – with Hikari Shimizu
- Pro Wrestling Illustrated
  - Ranked No. 118 of the top 250 female singles wrestlers in the PWI Women's 250 in 2023
- Pro Wrestling Wave
  - Wave Tag Team Championship (5 times) – with Hikari Shimizu (2) and Risa Sera (3)
  - Dual Shock Wave (2023) – with Risa Sera
- Pure-J
  - Pure-J Openweight Championship (1 time)
  - Daily Sports Women's Tag Team Championship (1 time) – with Rydeen Hagane
- Spark Joshi Puroresu of America
  - Spark Joshi Atlantic Championship (1 time, current, inaugural)
