= Minoru Fujita =

Japanese professional wrestler (born 1977)

- Fujita in February 2020

Personal information
- Born: September 5, 1977 (age 49) Onoda, Yamaguchi, Japan

Professional wrestling career
- Ring name(s): Minoru Fujita; Great Minoru Fujita; Mitaro Fujita; Mr. X Red Onigumo; HERO!
- Billed height: 1.78 m (5 ft 10 in)
- Billed weight: 80 kg (176 lb)
- Trained by: Kazuo Sakurada; Yoshihiro Tajiri
- Debut: April 11, 1997

Minoru Fujita (藤田 穣, Fujita Minoru; ring name: 藤田 ミノル) (born September 5, 1977) is a Japanese professional wrestler who works as a freelancer. He is known for working at Gatoh Move Pro Wrestling.

== Career ==
=== Japanese independent scene (1997-present) ===
Fujita started in Big Japan Pro Wrestling (BJW) as a protégé of its top junior heavyweight, Yoshihiro Tajiri. When Tajiri, who was Big Japan junior heavyweight champion, quit the company and gave up the title, Fujita had a decision match against Katsumi Usuda from the Battlarts promotion but ended up losing.

Fujita spent his time leaving Big Japan to venture into other Japanese independents, meeting Ikuto Hidaka of Battlarts along the way and making memorable tag team matches with him. The combination, however, despite their combined talent, could not have a future due to their separate schedules; Fujita tried a move to Michinoku Pro Wrestling in 2000, but despite the higher exposure, it did little for him financially and did not raise his stock as a viable junior heavyweight contender.

He thus headed for Mexico and Puerto Rico, where he won his first major title, the International Wrestling Association junior heavyweight title. Returning to Japan in 2002, he entered New Japan Pro-Wrestling (to which he had been once before, in a Best of the Super Junior tournament), to challenge the heavyweight division, but nothing came out of it. He then headed to Taka Michinoku's Kaientai Dojo promotion, but despite being promoted as a tough-to beat heel, he was never able to win titles there.

A change of pace came in 2004 when he joined Pro Wrestling Zero-One (Zero-One), where old friend Hidaka awaited. The two began teaming more frequently and this time they clicked, collecting several tag team titles along the way. Their greatest victory came in March 2006, when they defeated Pro Wrestling Noah (Noah) stars Yoshinobu Kanemaru and Takashi Sugiura to win the GHC Junior Heavyweight Tag Team Championship. Since then Fujita has been a rising star in Japan and has finally shed the "underachiever" tag he was saddled with by foreign observers of puroresu.

Fujita defeated Baliyan Akki on the day 2 of the 100th Anniversary of Chocopro on March 28, 2021 to win the Super Asia Championship.

== Championships and accomplishments ==
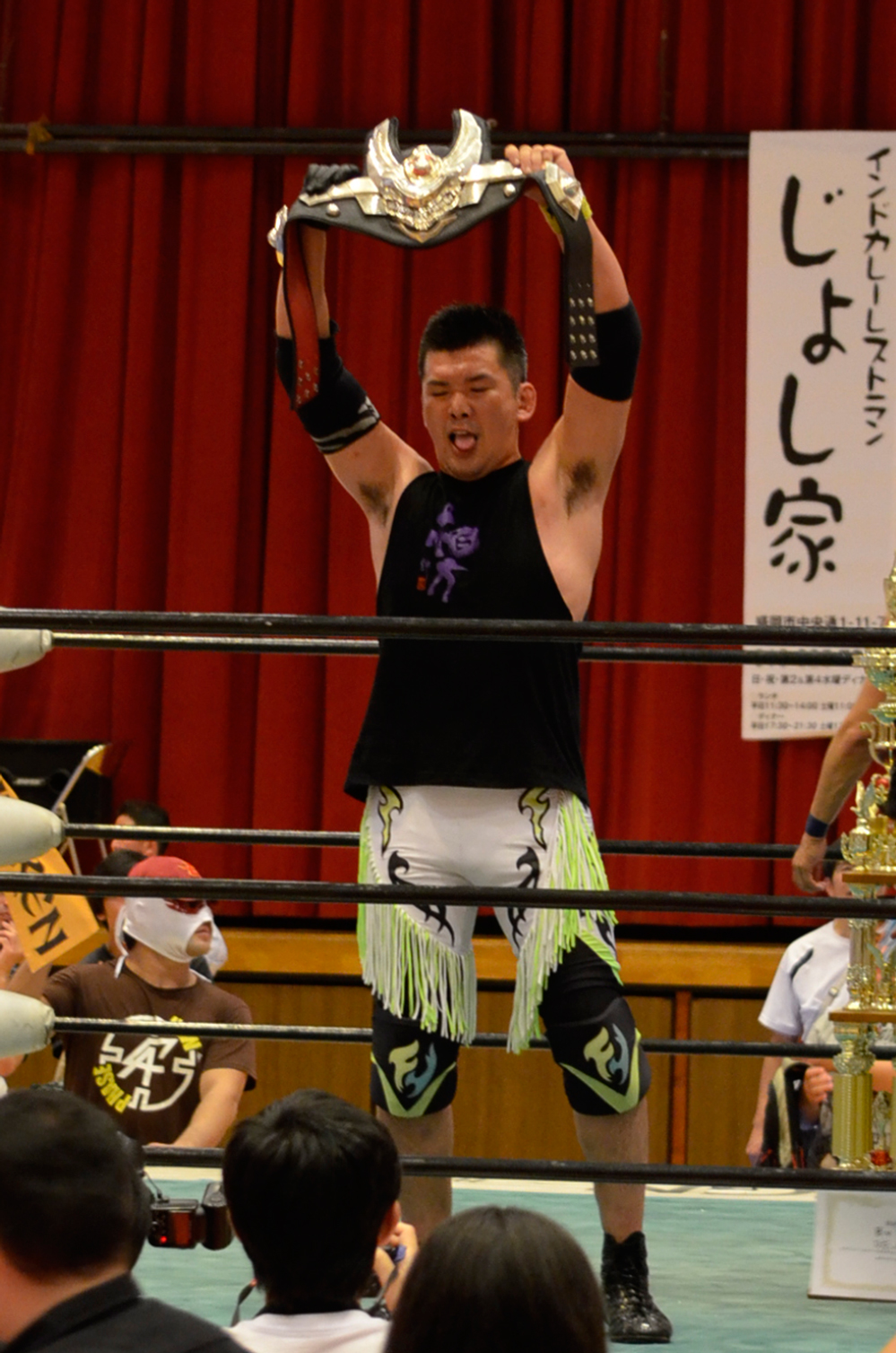
Fujita with one of the Tohoku Tag Team Championship belts.

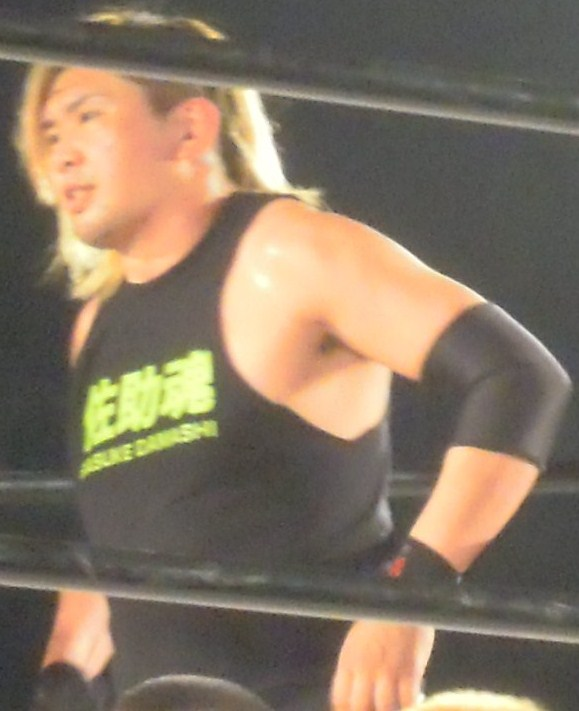
Fujita in 2010.

- Active Advance Pro Wrestling
  - 2AW Tag Team Championship (1 time, current) – with Ayato Yoshida
- Big Japan Pro Wrestling

- BJW Deathmatch Heavyweight Championship (1 time)
- UWA World Trios Championship (1 time, current) – with Isami Kodaka and Daiki Shimomura

- DDT Pro-Wrestling

- KO-D 6 Man Tag Team Championship (1 time) – with Daisuke Sasaki and MJ Paul
- KO-D Tag Team Championship (2 times) – with Harashima and Kanon
- Ironman Heavymetalweight Championship (1 time)
- UWA World Trios Championship (2 times) – with Mazada and Nosawa Rongai

- Gatoh Move Pro Wrestling/ChocoPro

- Super Asia Championship (1 time)
- Asia Dream Tag Team Championship (1 time, current) – with Sayaka Obihiro

- Ice Ribbon

- Triangle Ribbon Championship (2 times)

- International Wrestling Association

- IWA World Junior Heavyweight Championship (1 time)
- UWA World Junior Heavyweight Championship (1 time)

- Kohaku Wrestling Wars

- UWA World Tag Team Championship (1 time) – with Masamune

- Michinoku Pro Wrestling

- Tohoku Tag Team Championship (1 time) – with Ikuto Hidaka
- UWA World Tag Team Championship (1 time) – with Ikuto Hidaka

- Premier Wrestling Federation

- PWF Unified Tag Team Championship (1 time) – with Ikuto Hidaka

- Pro-Wrestling Basara
  - Iron Fist Tag Team Championship (1 time) – with Daiki Shimomura
  - Union Max Championship (1 time)
  - Itadaki (2021)
- Pro Wrestling Freedoms

- King of Freedom World Tag Team Championship (2 times) – with Kenji Fukimoto (1) and Rina Yamashita (1)

- Pro Wrestling Illustrated
  - Ranked No. 81 of the 500 best singles wrestlers in the PWI 500 in 2006
- Pro Wrestling Noah

- GHC Junior Heavyweight Tag Team Championship (1 time) – with Ikuto Hidaka

- Pro Wrestling Zero1

- AWA World Junior Heavyweight Championship (1 time)
- NWA Intercontinental Tag Team Championship (2 times) – with Ikuto Hidaka (1) and Takuya Sugawara (1)
- NWA International Lightweight Tag Team Championship (2 times) – with Ikuto Hidaka (1) and Takuya Sugawara (1)
- WDB Tag Team Championship (1 time) – with Saki Maemura
- Passion Cup Tag Tournament (2007)
- Tenkaichi Junior (2006)

- Tokyo Gurentai

- Tokyo Intercontinental Tag Team Championship (1 time) – with Mazada
- Tokyo World Heavyweight Championship (2 time, current)

- Tokyo Sports

- Best Tag Team Award (2005) with Ikuto Hidaka

- Total Triumph Team

- CCW Canadian Heavyweight Championship (1 time, current)
- Indie Unified Tag Team Championship (1 time, current) - with Keisuke Goto

- Wrestle-1

- UWA World Trios Championship (1 time) – with Mazada and Nosawa Rongai
