= Ice Ribbon =

Japanese women's professional wrestling promotion

- Ice Ribbon's current logo (2022–present)
- Founded: 2006
- Style: Joshi puroresu
- Headquarters: Warabi, Saitama, Japan
- Founder: Emi Sakura
- Owner(s): Rebellions Co., Ltd.
- Sister: Corazon Joshi Puroresu; Shinshu Girls Pro Wrestling
- Split from: Gatokunyan

Ice Ribbon (アイスリボン, Aisuribon) is a joshi puroresu (women's professional wrestling) promotion established in 2006 by Emi Sakura, after her split with Gatokunyan.

== History ==
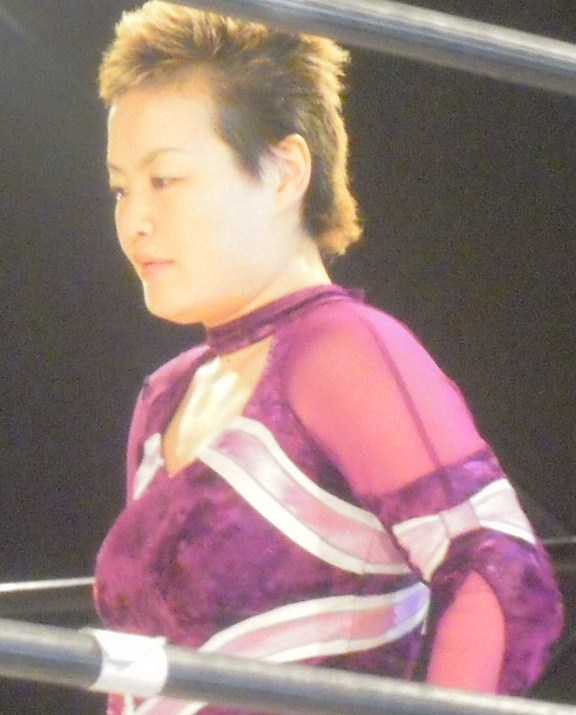
Emi Sakura

Former logo of the promotion (2006–2022).

Ice Ribbon was founded by Emi Sakura, a professional wrestler who was active with IWA Japan and FMW in the 1990s as Emi Motokawa. Ice Ribbon split off from Gatokunyan, Sakura's previous promotion, and held their first card on June 20, 2006 in Tokyo.

The promotion built their own dojo in Warabi, Saitama. Ice Ribbon's early shows mainly took place at the Saitama dojo, referred to by the promotion as the "Isami Wrestle Arena", while several larger annual events, like Golden Ribbon and RibbonMania, began being held at Korakuen Hall in Tokyo.

The early roster of Ice Ribbon was made up of wrestlers who transferred from Gatokunyan. The promotion's roster began to expand through collaborations with a TV program called "Muscle Venus" and the 2009 film, "Three Count". As part of these collaborations, Ice Ribbon recruited and trained several actresses as wrestlers. Among the actresses trained by Ice Ribbon, Hikaru Shida, Miyako Matsumoto, and Tsukasa Fujimoto remained active as wrestlers. Ice Ribbon additionally gained attention for training and debuting children as wrestlers. For example, Ice Ribbon wrestlers Riho and Hiragi Kurumi made their debuts at the age of nine, while Hikari Minami and Tsukushi were eleven and twelve, respectively, when they made their debuts. Some of the children who made their professional wrestling debuts as part of Ice Ribbon, such as Aoi Kizuki, Makoto, Moeka Haruhi, Kurumi, and Riho, are still active as wrestlers.

In 2009, Ice Ribbon was sold to Neoplus. On May 28, 2010, Ice Ribbon announced a new project called 19 O'Clock Girls ProWrestling (19時女子プロレス, Jūkyū-ji Joshi Puroresu), an internet streaming program on Ustream. The show aired Fridays at 19:00 Japan time (10:00 UTC). The original concept of the show saw Ice Ribbon rookie Sayaka Obihiro being assigned full-time to the project and facing Ice Ribbon wrestlers in weekly matches. The concept was abandoned on August 26, 2011, when the project was officially brought under the Ice Ribbon banner, with Obihiro again becoming a regular member of the Ice Ribbon roster and the 19 O'Clock Girls ProWrestling turning into a regular professional wrestling program with no distinct concept.

From its inception, Ice Ribbon had a close relationship with NEO Japan Ladies Pro Wrestling, which saw Ice Ribbon wrestlers Emi Sakura, Aoi Kizuki and Makoto make regular appearances for the promotion, while NEO wrestlers like Etsuko Mita, Tanny Mouse and Yoshiko Tamura also made several appearances for Ice Ribbon. The relationship lasted until NEO folded on December 31, 2010, with Emi Sakura, Hikaru Shida, Makoto and Tsukasa Fujimoto appearing at the promotion's final event. Starting in late 2010, Ice Ribbon was involved in a year-long interpromotional storyline rivalry with the Sendai Girls' Pro Wrestling promotion, which saw Ice Ribbon and Sendai Girls' wrestlers make regular appearances for the opposing promotion. Through its relationships with American promotion Chikara and the British Pro-Wrestling: EVE, Ice Ribbon's wrestlers have also made appearances in the United States and the United Kingdom. Ice Ribbon has additionally had close relationships with the DDT Pro-Wrestling (DDT), Big Japan Pro Wrestling (BJW), JWP Joshi Puroresu, Pro Wrestling Wave, and Reina Joshi Puroresu promotions.

On December 14, 2011, Ice Ribbon's founder Emi Sakura announced that she was leaving the promotion for "personal reasons" following the January 7, 2012, event in Sendai. Following Sakura's departure, Hikaru Shida and Tsukasa Fujimoto took over the training duties at the Ice Ribbon dojo. In 2012, Ray, Sayaka Obihiro, and Ice Ribbon dojo graduates Hikari Minami and Riho also left Ice Ribbon, while Dorami Nagano took a sabbatical to concentrate on her studies. To combat the decreasing number of wrestlers on its active roster, Ice Ribbon introduced the first six wrestlers trained by Hikaru Shida and Tsukasa Fujimoto: Eri Wakamatsu, Fumiko Sato, Risa Okuda, Rutsuko Yamaguchi, Oshima Kujira and Shoko Hotta. Wakamatsu and Hotta, along with Ayano Takeda and Hiroko Terada, two other Shida and Fujimoto trainees who debuted before the end of 2012, all ended their professional wrestling careers by April 2013. Trainee Risa Sera (previously known as Risa Okuda) is still active in wrestling.

In February 2012, Ice Ribbon formed a partnership with Japanese pop group hy4_4yh (Hyper Yo-yo). The partnership led to the group making musical appearances at Ice Ribbon events, performing Maki Narumiya's new entrance theme and, on March 7, the two promoting the first "Hyper Ribbon" event, which featured both matches and musical performances. On December 12, 2012, Neoplus officially announced the creation of Corazon Joshi Puroresu, Ice Ribbon's sister promotion, which features a more theatrical take on professional wrestling. Following Sayaka Obihiro's December 2012 departure from Ice Ribbon, the promotion put 19 O'Clock Girls ProWrestling on hiatus as it considered the future of the program. On January 4, 2014, Ice Ribbon was dealt another blow, when Hikaru Shida announced she was also leaving the promotion the following March. On January 22, longtime freelancer Mio Shirai signed a contract with Ice Ribbon. Following her September 2015 retirement, she became a referee and trainer for Ice Ribbon. On January 3, 2016, Ice Ribbon Aoi Kizuki announced her departure from the promotion.

In March 2017, Hana Date, Karen Date, Nao Date and Nori Date, four mixed martial artists representing Team Date, signed with Ice Ribbon. In 2018, Team Date's contracts with Ice Ribbon expired.

In February 2021, the Ice Ribbon dojo hosted the Warabi Regional bracket for United States–based All Elite Wrestling (AEW)'s Women's World Championship Eliminator Tournament. The tournament was broken into two separate brackets, with eight women competing in matches in the Jacksonville Regional bracket and eight women competing in Ice Ribbon's Warabi Regional bracket. The winner of each bracket will then face each other in the tournament final on AEW Dynamite to determine the overall winner, with the overall tournament winner facing Ice Ribbon alumni Hikaru Shida for the AEW Women's World Championship at Revolution. The tournament was won by Ryo Mizunami.

In September 2021, president of Ice Ribbon Hajime Sato appeared alongside Kounosuke Izui, promoter of Lady's Ring, on an episode of CMLL Informa to announce the establishment of a working relationship between the two promotions and the Mexican-based Consejo Mundial de Lucha Libre (CMLL).

On December 12, 2023, Ice Ribbon was acquired by management company Rebellions Co., Ltd. Multiple wrestlers left the promotion as full-time wrestlers on December 31, 2024, including Mio Shirai, Yuki Mashiro, Saran, Mifu Ashida and Nanae Furukawa.

== Roster ==
=== Wrestlers ===
Ring name	Real name	Notes
Ancham	Unknown	Freelancer
Akane Fujita	Unknown	Freelancer
Arisa Shinose	Unknown	
Banny Oikawa	Unknown	Inactive
Cherry	Unknown	
Grizzly Fujitaki	Unknown	
Hamuko Hoshi	Unknown	
Hikari Minami	Hikari Minami	Triangle Ribbon Champion; International Ribbon Tag Team Champion
Ibuki Hoshi	Unknown	Inactive
Kaho Matsushita	Unknown	
Kaori Yoneyama	Kaori Yoneyama	Freelancer
Kirari Wakana	Unknown	
Kyuri	Unknown	
Makoto	Unknown	Freelancer
Manami Katsu	Unknown	International Ribbon Tag Team Champion
Mayuka Koike	Unknown	
Miku Kanae	Unknown	
Miran	Unknown	
Misa Kagura	Unknown	Freelancer
Sumika Yanagawa	Unknown	Freelancer; ICE Cross Infinity Champion
Totoro Satsuki	Unknown	
Tsukasa Fujimoto	Tsukasa Fujimoto	
Tsukina Umino	Unknown	FantastICE Champion
Yappy	Yapi Santiago	
Yuna Manase	Unknown	Freelancer
Yuki Mashiro	Unknown	Freelancer
Yuu Hanaya	Unknown	

== Alumni/notable guests ==
=== Female ===
- 235
- Aika Ando
- Aiki
- Aja Kong
- Akari
- Aki Shizuku
- Ami Miura
- Amu Yumesaki
- Aoi Kizuki
- Arisa Nakajima
- Asahi
- Azumi Hyuga
- Chii Tomiya
- Chie Ozora
- Crea
- Dorami Nagano
- Gami
- Giulia
- Haruka Umesaki
- Hikari Shimizu
- Hikaru Shida
- Hinata
- Hiragi Kurumi
- Hiroe Nagahama
- Itsuki Aoki
- Kaho Kobayashi
- Kaori Yoneyama
- Kaoru Ito
- Kazumi Shimouma
- Kiku
- Mai Sakurai
- Kiyoko Ichiki
- Maika Ozaki
- Maki Narumiya
- Makoto
- Maria
- Maruko Nagasaki
- Matsuya Uno
- Maya Yukihi
- Mayumi Ozaki
- Michiko Miyagi
- Mifu Ashida
- Mika Iida
- Miku Aono
- Mio Shirai
- Misa Matsui
- Misae Genki
- Miyako Matsumoto
- Miyuki Takase
- Mochi Miyagi
- Momo Kohgo
- Nanae Furukawa
- Nanae Takahashi
- Nao Ishikawa
- Nao Kakuta
- Neko Nitta
- Rabbit Miu
- Riko Kaiju
- Rina Amikura
- Rina Shingaki
- Rina Yamashita
- Risa Sera
- Rydeen Hagane
- Sachie Abe
- Saki
- Sakura Hirota
- Saori Anou
- Saran
- Sareee
- Sawako Shimono
- Sayaka Obihiro
- Suzu Suzuki
- Tae Honma
- Tanny Mouse
- Tequila Saya
- Thekla
- Tsukushi Haruka
- Yako Fujigasaki
- Yuko Sakurai
- Yuu Yamagata
- Yuuri
- Yuuki Minami

=== Male ===
- Choun Shiryu
- Banana Senga
- Drew Parker
- Fuminori Abe
- Hartley Jackson
- Hideki Suzuki
- Isami Kodaka
- Jun Kasai
- Koju Takeda
- Masashi Takeda
- Minoru Fujita
- Shoki Kitamura
- Takayuki Ueki
- Tank Nagai
- Toshiyuki Sakuda
- Violento Jack
- Yasu Urano
- Yuko Miyamoto
- Yoshihisa Uto

=== Referees ===
Ring name	Real name
Mio Shirai	Unknown

=== Broadcast team ===
Ring name	Real name	Notes
Ai Hara	Unknown	Ring announcer
Chiharu	Chiharu Ono	Ring announcer

=== Backstage personnel ===
Ring name	Real name	Notes
Manami Toyota	Manami Toyota	Managing Supervisor

== Championships ==
As of November 11, 2026

=== Active ===
Championship	Current champion(s)	Reign	Date won	Days held	Location	Notes
ICE×∞ Championship	Sumika Yanagawa	1	August 9, 2026	94+	Tokyo, Japan	Defeated Kaho Matsushita at Ice Ribbon New Ice Ribbon #1507.
FantastICE Championship	Tsukina Umino	1	December 31, 2025	315+	Tokyo, Japan	Defeated Akane Fujita at New Ice Ribbon #1464 ~ RibbonMania 2025.
International Ribbon Tag Team Championship	Hikari&Manami (Hikari Minami and Manami Katsu)	1 (1, 2)	August 30, 2026	73+	Yokohama, Japan	Defeated Mystic Eclipse (Makoto and Sumika Yanagawa) at Ice Ribbon New Ice Ribbon #1511.
Triangle Ribbon Championship	Kaho Matsushita	1	November 8, 2026	3+	Tokyo, Japan	Defeated Hikari Minami and Yuuka in a three-way match at Ice Ribbon New Ice Ribbon #1526.

=== Formerly promoted ===
Championship	Last champions	Reign	Date won	Location
IW19 Championship	Tsukushi Haruka	4	September 18, 2021	Tokyo, Japan
Reina World Tag Team Championship	Muscle Venus (Hikaru Shida and Tsukasa Fujimoto)	2	May 25, 2013	Yokohama, Japan
Young Ribbon Mixed Tag Team Championship	Yuko Miyamoto and Risa Sera	1	March 24, 2013	Warabi, Japan
