= Aika Ando =

Japanese gravure idol and wrestler (born 1984)

- 安藤 あいか
- Born: July 9, 1984 (age 42); Tokyo, Japan
- Occupations: gravure idol; wrestler
- Years active: 2007–present
- Agents: Newgate Production; Ice Ribbon (wrestling)
- Height: 1.6 m (5 ft 3 in)

Aika Ando (安藤 あいか, Andō Aika; born July 9, 1984, in Tokyo, Japan) is a Japanese gravure idol and professional wrestler who is represented by the talent agencies, Newgate Production and Ice Ribbon. She was a member of the Ebisu Muscats.

== Biography ==
In 2007, Ando won the Sabra Quasi Grand Prix Award in the "1st Burgaru Championship". She later started gravure activities in the opportunity.

In the same year, during the planning for Dainichi Taisen on Television Saitama, Ando was introduced to professional wrestling organization Ice Ribbon, and on October 20, she debuted with Aoi Kizuki in Ichigaya Ice Box.

On August 23, 2008, she was announced in the Shin-Kiba 1st Ring but later withdrew after the game. At the time Ando was auditioning for Hustle.

In May 2009, she continued idol activities in Fukkatsu! Miniskirt Police.

In mid-2011, Ando left the professional wrestling for entertainment activities. In 2014, she is still in Ice Ribbon as a diva.

During a broadcast of Ōkubo jā Night, Ando confessed that her actual age is 29, and revealed that she had lied about being 2 years younger than she was.

== Filmography ==
=== TV series ===
| Year | Title | Network | Notes |
|---|---|---|---|
| | Dainichi Taisen | TV Saitama | |
| | Gravure Talk Audition | Fuji TV | |
| 2008 | Onegai! Muscat | TV Tokyo | |
| | Kunoichi.TV | TVH | |
| 2008 | Itsuzai | TV Tokyo | |
| 2008 | Summers Shiki | TBS | |
| 2008 | Obiraji R | TBS | |
| 2009 | Onedari!! Muscat | TV Tokyo | |
| 2009 | Coi to Muscat! | TV Tokyo | |
| 2009 | Utsukushiki Aoki do Nau | TV Asahi | |
| 2009 | Hori sa Maazu | TBS | |
| 2010 | Campus Night Fuji | Fuji TV | |
| 2010 | Push Sma | TV Asahi | |
| 2010 | Marusummers | TBS | |
| 2010 | Onedar Muscat DX! | TV Tokyo | |
| 2010 | Mecha-Mecha Iketeru! | Fuji TV | |
| 2010 | Sakigake! Ongaku Banzuke | Fuji TV | |
| 2011 | Oh! Doyakao Summit | TV Asahi | |
| 2011 | Onedari Muscat SP! | TV Tokyo | |
| 2012 | Goddotan | TV Tokyo | |
| 2012 | Kanningu Takeyama no Zeni Nāru Jogakuin | MBS | |
| 2012 | 24-jikan Kasumi Radio | Enter!371 | |

=== Internet series ===
| Year | Title | Network | Notes |
|---|---|---|---|
| 2009 | Fukkatsu! Miniskirt Police | Niconico, Aipai Channel | |
| | Fukkatsu! Miniskirt Police Atsu! To Odoroku Kinkyū Shutsudō! | Atsu! To Odoroku Hōsōkyoku | |
| 2011 | Fukkatsu! Miniskirt Police no Niconico Patrol | Nico Jockey | |
| 2012 | 24-jikan Kasumi Radio | Niconico Live | |
| | Fukkatsu! Miniskirt Police no Niko Jockey | | |
| 2013 | Okumanchōja e no Michi | Nico Jockey | |

=== Mobile series ===
| Title | Network | Notes |
|---|---|---|
| Idol ga Ippai | Aipai | |

=== Films ===
| Year | Title | Role | Notes |
|---|---|---|---|
| 2011 | Hard Life Murasaki no Seishun Koi to Kenka to Tokkō-fuku | Sizuka | |
| 2014 | Jane Ueshima Beyond | | |
