= Mei Suruga =

Japanese professional wrestler

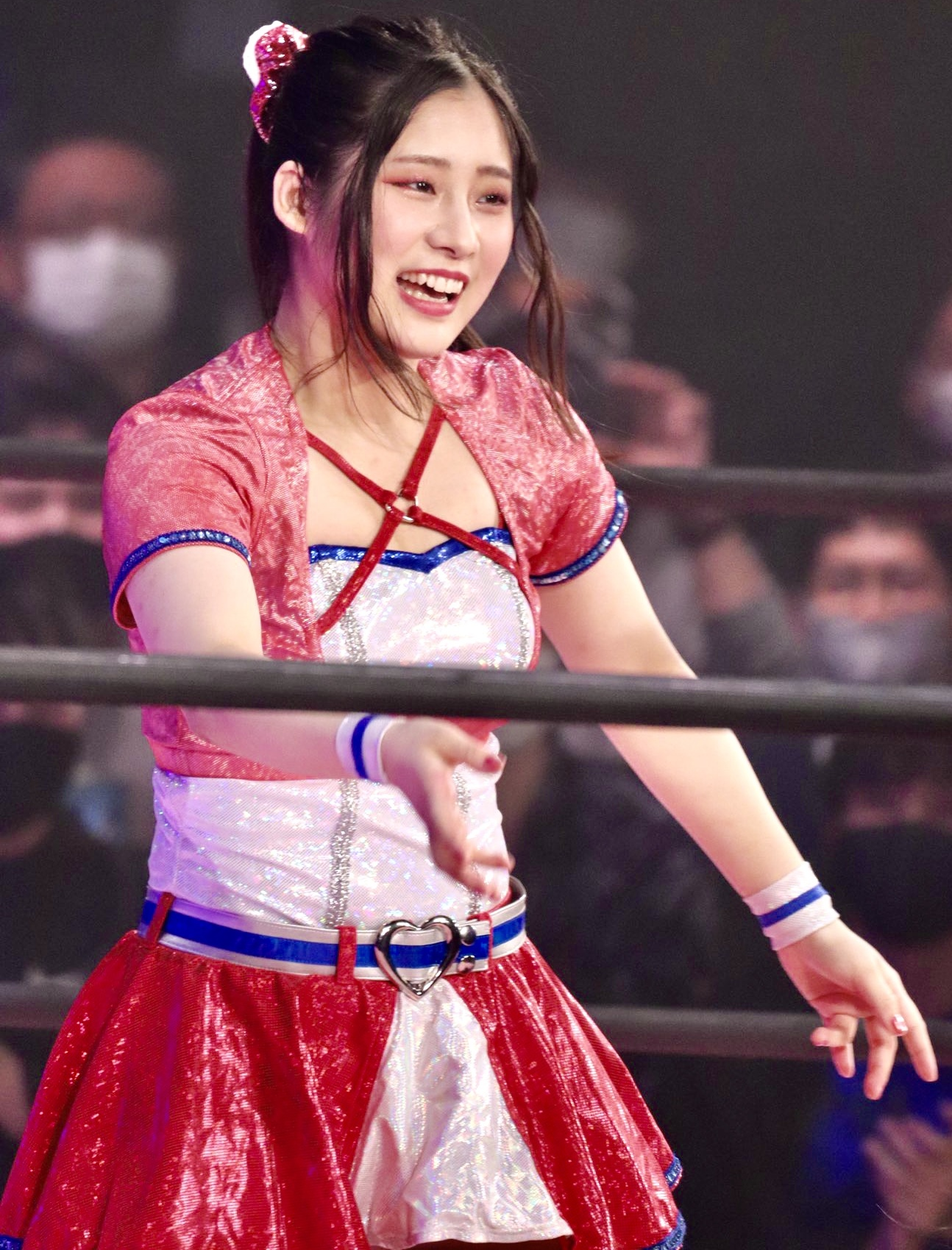
- Suruga in November 2020

Personal information
- Born: May 30, 1999 (age 27) Kyoto, Japan

Professional wrestling career
- Ring name(s): Mei Saint-Michel; Mei Suruga; Pink Menso-re
- Billed height: 1.48 m (4 ft 10 in)
- Billed weight: 50 kg (110 lb)
- Trained by: Emi Sakura
- Debut: 2018

Mei Suruga (駿河メイ, Suruga Mei; born May 30, 1999) is a Japanese professional wrestler, currently working for ChocoPro.

Suruga is a former one time Asia Dream Tag Team Champion and one-time Princess Tag Team Champion.

== Professional wrestling career ==
=== Gatoh Move Pro Wrestling / ChocoPro (2018–present) ===
Suruga debuted as a professional wrestler at Gatoh Move In Kitazawa Town Hall, an event promoted by Gatoh Move Pro Wrestling on May 27, 2018, where she fell short to her trainer, Emi Sakura. At Gatoh Move ChocoPro #76 on December 31, 2020, Suruga teamed up with Baliyan Akki as Best Bros to defeat Reset (Emi Sakura and Kaori Yoneyama) for the Asia Dream Tag Team Championship.

=== DDT Pro Wrestling (2018–present) ===
She participated at DDT Beer Garden Fight 2018, an event promoted by DDT Pro-Wrestling (DDT) on August 1, 2018, where she teamed up with Emi Sakura and Riho, falling short to NEO Biishiki-gun (Masahiro Takanashi, Yoshiko and Sakisama). Suruga competed in another DDT event, titled Masa Takanashi Produce ~ Follow Me on September 15, 2019, where she teamed up with Saki Akai and participated in an eight-team gauntlet tag team match competing against the eventual winners Hoshitango and Seiya Morohashi, Mao and Yusuke Inokuma, Disaster Box (Kazuki Hirata and Toru Owashi), Antonio Honda and Riho, Cherry and Emi Sakura, Gota Ihashi and Shota, and Gorgeous Matsuno and Konosuke Takeshita.

=== Independent circuit (2018–present) ===
Suruga competed in the EVE SHE-1 ~ Ace Of EVE 2019, a tournament promoted by Pro-Wrestling: EVE, in November 2019, where she placed herself in the Block C and competed against Jetta, Jazz, Rhia O'Reilly and Lulu Pencil, finishing with four points. At AJPW GROWIN' UP Vol.24, an event produced by All Japan Pro Wrestling on February 26, 2020, Suruga teamed up with Black Menso～re under the ring name of Pink Menso～re to defeat Hikaru Sato and Sumire Natsu in an intergender tag team match.

=== Sendai Girls' Pro Wrestling (2018–2020) ===
Suruga is also known for her tenure with Sendai Girls' Pro Wrestling. On April 17, 2019, at a house show, she teamed up with Jordynne Grace and Sareee to defeat Chihiro Hashimoto, Killer Kelly and Mikoto Shindo in a six-woman tag team match. One day earlier, on April 16, 2019, Suruga competed at another house show where she teamed up with Ryo Mizunami to defeat Kaoru and Mikoto Shindo. At Sendai Girls Joshi Puroresu Big Show In Sendai on October 13, 2019, Suruga competed in a 8-woman battle royal against the winner Hikaru Shida, Jaguar Yokota, Kaoru, Sakura Hirota, Alex Lee, Ayame Sasamura and Aiger.

=== Tokyo Joshi Pro Wrestling (2020–present) ===
Suruga first appeared in Tokyo Joshi Pro Wrestling in a tag match with Moka Miyamoto at Wrestle Princess I before beginning to appear regularly under her Mei Saint-Michel gimmick in December 2020. Suruga won the "Futari wa Princess" Max Heart Tournament on March 6, 2021, teaming with Sakisama as NEO Biishiki-gun, defeating Maki Itoh and Miyu Yamashita in the finals. At Tokyo Joshi Pro Wrestling's TJPW Still Incomplete on April 17, 2021, Suruga and Sakisama defeated Bakurestu Sisters (Nodoka Tenma and Yuki Aino) to win the Princess Tag Team Championship. NEO Biishiki-gun lost the tag titles to the team of the Magical Sugar Rabbits (Yuka Sakazaki and Mizuki) at Wrestle Princess II on October 9, 2021.

=== All Elite Wrestling (2021) ===
On February 3, 2021, at Beach Break, Suruga was announced as a participant in the AEW Women's World Championship Eliminator Tournament. She lost to Yuka Sakazaki in the first round which aired on February 15. On February 28, 2021, she teamed up with Hikaru Shida and Rin Kadokura to defeat Veny, Maki Itoh and Emi Sakura in a six-person tag team match. In November and December 2021 Suruga returned to AEW, where she served primarily as a valet to Emi Sakura.

== Championships and accomplishments ==
- Consejo Mundial de Lucha Libre
  - Amazonas Del Mundo torneo cibernetico (2022)
- Deadlock Pro-Wrestling
  - DPW Women's Worlds Championship (1 time, current)
- Gatoh Move Pro Wrestling/ChocoPro
  - Super Asia Championship (1 time)
  - Asia Dream Tag Team Championship (2 times) – with Baliyan Akki
- Pro Wrestling Illustrated
  - Ranked No. 93 of the top 150 female wrestlers in the PWI Women's 150 in 2022
  - Ranked No. 382 of the top 500 singles wrestlers in the PWI 500 in 2021
- Tokyo Joshi Pro Wrestling

- Princess Tag Team Championship (1 time) – with Sakisama
- "Futari wa Princess" Max Heart Tournament (2021) – with Sakisama
