= Emi Sakura =

Japanese professional wrestler (born 1976)

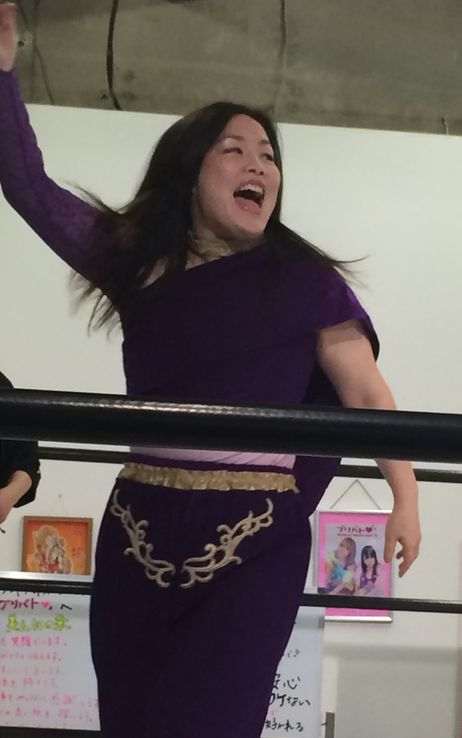
- Sakura in April 2014

Personal information
- Born: Emi Motokawa; October 4, 1976 (age 50) Kimitsu, Chiba, Japan

Professional wrestling career
- Ring name(s): Black Cherry #3; Emi Motokawa; Emi Sakura; Kyoko Inoue #5
- Billed height: 158 cm (5 ft 2 in)
- Billed weight: 75 kg (165 lb)
- Billed from: Chiba, Japan
- Trained by: Akio Sato
- Debut: August 17, 1995

Emi Motokawa (元川 恵美, Motokawa Emi; born October 4, 1976), better known by the ring name Emi Sakura (さくら えみ, Sakura Emi), is a Japanese professional wrestler currently performing for All Elite Wrestling (AEW), ChocoPro and on the independent circuit. After starting her career in International Wrestling Association of Japan in August 1995, Sakura worked for several promotions across Japan, winning numerous titles, before founding her own promotion, Ice Ribbon, in early 2006. Sakura not only wrestled for the promotion, but was also solely responsible for training wrestlers for the promotion, where she went on to become a two-time ICE×60 Champion and a five-time International Ribbon Tag Team Champion.

During 2009, Sakura held not only both the ICE×60 and International Ribbon Tag Team Championships, but also the Daily Sports Women's and JWP Tag Team Championships and the NEO Single and NWA Women's Pacific Championships, which led to the Tokyo Sports magazine naming her the 2009 joshi wrestler of the year. After six years with Ice Ribbon, Sakura left the promotion for "personal reasons" in January 2012. The following month, Sakura formed the Gatoh Move Pro Wrestling promotion in Bangkok, Thailand. During 2012, Sakura also became a regular for JWP Joshi Puroresu, winning the JWP Openweight Championship in October.

== Professional wrestling career ==
=== IWA Japan and FMW (1994–2002) ===
In 1994, aged 17, Motokawa decided to find a career in professional wrestling and after going to auditions with the Ladies Legend Pro-Wrestling (LLPW) and Gaea Japan promotions, she was finally accepted into the International Wrestling Association of Japan dojo for training. Motokawa, working under her real name, made her professional wrestling debut on August 17, 1995, in a match against Kiyoko Ichiki. As IWA Japan had no other female wrestlers, Sakura spent her first year working almost exclusively with Ichiki. On August 13, 1997, Motokawa won her first championship, when she defeated Luna Vachon at an IWA Japan event to win American Wrestling Federation's (AWF) World Women's Championship. When IWA Japan started a working relationship with All Japan Women's Pro-Wrestling (AJW), Motokawa also began making appearances for AJW, unsuccessfully challenging Momoe Nakanishi for the AJW Junior Championship on August 26 and teaming with Manami Toyota in the 1997 Tag League the Best tournament. On January 24, 1998, Sakura defeated Momoe Nakanishi to win the AJW Championship. She would lose the title back to Nakanishi on April 12. On March 19, 1999, Motokawa lost the AWF World Women's Championship to Yuko Kosugi, after which she left IWA Japan.

On August 20, 1999, Motokawa began working regularly for Frontier Martial-Arts Wrestling (FMW), where she often wrestled opposite Kaori Nakayama. On October 24, 2000, Motokawa teamed with Azusa Kudo and Hisakatsu Oya to unsuccessfully challenge Nakayama, Gedo and Jado for the WEW 6-Man Tag Team Championship. Motokawa wrestled regularly for the promotion until August 2001, when she began suffering from various injuries, which eventually led her to undergo a hernia surgery. While she was sidelined, FMW went out of business.

=== Gatokunyan (2002–2006) ===
In 2002, Motokawa joined the Gatokunyan (我闘姑娘, Gatōkūnyan; GTKN) promotion, where she worked for the first year solely as a trainer, before returning to the ring in 2003 under the new ring name Emi Sakura. During her years in the GTKN, Sakura split her time between wrestling and training virtually all other wrestlers in the promotion.

=== Ice Ribbon (2006–2012) ===
In April 2006, Sakura left Gatokunyan to form her own promotion, named Ice Ribbon. Buying a dojo in Saitama, Sakura continued to train wrestlers she had taken with her from Gatokunyan, including Aika Ando, Aoi Kizuki, Hikari Minami, Mai Ichii, Makoto, Riho and Seina. Ice Ribbon held its first two shows on June 20, 2006. Sakura wrestled her first match for the promotion on October 15, losing to Riho. Sakura spent most of her first year in Ice Ribbon, working with her then-nine-year-old pupil. From the start, Ice Ribbon had a close relationship with the NEO Japan Ladies Pro Wrestling promotion, which led to Sakura and some of her trainees making semi-regular appearances with the promotion. In storyline, the partnership was explained with a relationship between Sakura and NEO president Tetsuya Koda. On February 18, 2007, the Sakura Ribbon Army, a team of Sakura and some of her trainees and friends, defeated the NEO Machineguns Army in a seven-on-seven battle royal, earning Sakura and Koda the right to marry each other and unify NEO and Ice Ribbon. However, after pleading from her trainees, Sakura turned on Koda and abandoned him at the altar, ending the storyline. On July 16, Sakura teamed with Yoshiko Tamura to defeat Haruka Matsuo and Misae Genki for the NEO Tag Team Championship. They would lose the title to Ayako Hamada and Kaoru Ito just thirteen days later. During 2008, Sakura made her acting debut, working on the film Three Count, which was set in the world of professional wrestling and also starred fellow wrestler Kyoko Inoue and Yoshiko Tamura. From the cast of the film, Sakura received three more trainees to her Ice Ribbon dojo, Hikaru Shida, Miyako Matsumoto and Tsukasa Fujimoto. On November 15, 2008, Sakura teamed with male wrestler Ribbon Takanashi to unsuccessfully challenge Riho and Yuki Sato for the International Ribbon Tag Team Championship. The following April, Sakura teamed with another one of her trainees, Makoto, facing Nanae Takahashi and Minori Makiba in a losing effort in a match for the vacant International Ribbon Tag Team Championship.

On May 3, 2009, Sakura defeated Nanae Takahashi at a NEO event to win the NEO Single and NWA Women's Pacific Championships. The finish of the match had to be improvised, after Sakura legitimately knocked Takahashi unconscious with a sunset flip powerbomb, which resulted in the referee ending the match without a three count and NEO president Tetsuya Koda awarding the titles to Sakura. Her reign ended just two days later, when she was defeated by Yoshiko Tamura. On July 5, Sakura and Nanae Takahashi defeated Tamura and Fuka in the finals to win NEO's Mid Summer Tag Tournament VIII. On July 19, Sakura teamed with Kaori Yoneyama at a JWP Joshi Puroresu event to defeat Command Bolshoi and Megumi Yabushita for the JWP Tag Team and Daily Sports Women's Tag Team Championships. Sakura won her first championship in Ice Ribbon on September 21, when she and Yoneyama defeated Takahashi and Makiba for the International Ribbon Tag Team Championship, becoming Triple Crown Tag Team Champions in the process. Sakura's streak of title wins continued on October 12, when she defeated Makoto for Ice Ribbon's top title, the ICE×60 Championship. During the next month, Sakura successfully defended the ICE×60 Championship eight times, defeating Hikari Minami, Mai Ichii, Chii Tomiya, Riho, Tsukasa Fujimoto, Makoto, Yukie Abe, and Misaki Ohata. On December 13, Sakura and Yoneyama lost all three of their tag team titles to Azumi Hyuga and Ran Yu-Yu at a JWP event. On December 17, in recognition of the six different championships Sakura held in 2009, the Tokyo Sports magazine named her the joshi wrestler of the year. On December 31, Sakura entered the Super-Ice Cup, where she put the ICE×60 Championship on the line in each of her matches. After defeating Miyako Matsumoto and Hikari Minami in her first round and semifinal matches, Sakura was defeated in the finals on January 4, 2010, by Tsukasa Fujimoto in just six seconds. With the defeat, Sakura's reign ended at 84 days and ten successful defenses.

Also in January, Sakura debuted her newest trainee, the twelve-year-old Tsukushi, with whom she would work for most of the year. On April 3, Riho won the ICE×60 Championship for the first time and immediately afterwards nominated her trainer Sakura as her first challenger for the title, however, as the title had a 60 kg (130 lb) weight limit, Sakura first had to drop 10 kg (22 lb) of weight before being eligible to challenge for the title. On May 3 at Golden Ribbon, Sakura defeated Riho to win the ICE×60 Championship for the second time. After successful defenses against Tsukasa Fujimoto and Tsukushi, Sakura lost the title to Hikari Minami on July 19. On September 19, Sakura unsuccessfully challenged Kaori Yoneyama for the JWP Openweight Championship and was then, as per stipulation of the match, shaved bald. In late 2010, Ice Ribbon started an interpromotional storyline rivalry with the Sendai Girls' Pro Wrestling, which saw Sendai Girls' founder Meiko Satomura arrive to Ice Ribbon on September 23 to defeat Sakura in a singles match. Two days later, Sakura and Nanae Takahashi defeated Gentaro and Mai Ichii for the International Ribbon Tag Team Championship. On November 22, Sakura made her debut for Smash at Smash.10, where she teamed with Kaori Yoneyama in a losing effort against the team of Kana and Syuri. After a three-month reign, Sakura and Takahashi were stripped of the International Ribbon Tag Team Championship on December 11, after a title defense against Hikaru Shida and Yoshiko Tamura ended in a twenty-minute time limit draw. Sakura and Takahashi attempted to regain the title on December 23, but were defeated in the finals of a tournament by Muscle Venus (Hikaru Shida and Tsukasa Fujimoto). The following day, Sakura returned to Smash at Happening Eve, where she was defeated by Jessica Love.

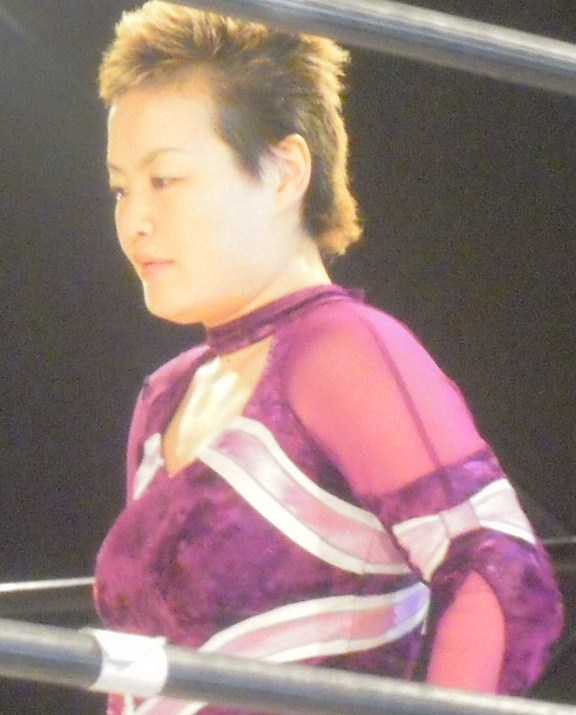
Sakura in February 2011

In February 2011, Sakura formed a tag team with the debuting Ray, her first ever trainee from the Gatokunyan dojo. On March 19, Sakura and Ray defeated Muscle Venus in a non-title match to earn a match for the International Ribbon Tag Team Championship on March 26, where they became the new champions. On April 10, Sakura attempted to become a double champion, but her match for the IW19 Championship with Tsukushi ended in a nineteen-minute time limit draw. On June 1, Sakura and Ray lost the International Ribbon Tag Team Championship to the Lovely Butchers (Hamuko Hoshi and Mochi Miyagi) in their fifth defense. Sakura regained the title from the Lovely Butchers on August 13, teaming with Makoto, who had just announced that she was leaving Ice Ribbon to join the Smash promotion on a full-time basis. After the two had successfully defended the title against Hikari Minami and Riho on August 17, Sakura defeated Makoto in her Ice Ribbon farewell match on August 21, after which the International Ribbon Tag Team Championship was vacated. In October, Sakura, Hikari Minami, Hikaru Shida and Tsukasa Fujimoto traveled to Nottingham, England to take part in events promoted by Pro-Wrestling: EVE and Southside Wrestling Entertainment (SWE). During the tour Sakura unsuccessfully challenged Jenny Sjödin for the Pro-Wrestling: EVE Championship. On October 27, Sakura led Team Ice Ribbon to Sendai Girls' Joshi Puroresu Dantai Taikou Flash tournament, a single-elimination tournament, where different joshi promotions battled each other. Ice Ribbon, represented by Sakura, Hikari Minami, Hikaru Shida, Tsukasa Fujimoto and Tsukushi, was eliminated from the tournament in the first round by their rival, Team Sendai, represented by Meiko Satomura, Dash Chisako, Kagetsu, Miyako Morino and Sendai Sachiko. On December 14, Sakura surprisingly announced that she was leaving Ice Ribbon for "personal reasons" following the January 7, 2012, event in Sendai. The storyline rivalry between Ice Ribbon and Sendai Girls' ended on December 25 at RibbonMania 2011, where Sakura and Tsukushi defeated Meiko Satomura and Sendai Sachiko to win the vacant International Ribbon Tag Team Championship. However, Sakura's and Tsukushi's reign would last only three days, before they lost the title to Hikaru Shida and Maki Narumiya. On January 7, 2012, Sakura was defeated by Tsukushi in her Ice Ribbon farewell match.

=== Gatoh Move Pro Wrestling (2012–) ===
Sakura made her first appearance as a freelancer on January 8, 2012, at Bull Nakano's retirement event, where she teamed with Meiko Satomura and Nanae Takahashi to defeat Ayumi Kurihara, Tsukasa Fujimoto and Yoshiko in a six-woman tag team match, pinning her trainee Fujimoto for the win. On February 12, Sakura appeared at a JWP event, where she announced that she was going to start another Ice Ribbon-like promotion in Bangkok, Thailand. Sakura and Kaori Yoneyama then agreed to a match, where, if Sakura was victorious, Yoneyama would join her in Thailand, but if Yoneyama was victorious, Sakura would make JWP her new home promotion in Japan. Sakura officially established the Bangkok Girls Pro Wrestling (BKK Pro) promotion the following week. On April 20, Sakura returned to Japan and made her debut for Pro Wrestling Wave, wrestling Toshie Uematsu in a losing effort as part of Uematsu's retirement tour. Following the match, Sakura teamed with Gami in a bonus match, where they wrestled Uematsu and Ran Yu-Yu to a five-minute time limit draw. Two days later, Sakura returned to JWP, defeating Kaori Yoneyama in a singles match; as a result, Yoneyama was forced to join BKK Pro. On May 4, Sakura and Yoneyama defeated Command Bolshoi and Rabbit Miu to win the vacant JWP Tag Team and Daily Sports Women's Tag Team Championships, taking the belts with them to Thailand. Later that same day, Sakura made an appearance for Union Pro Wrestling, replacing an injured Mio Shirai in a match and defeating Cherry, following interference from Shirai. Sakura's Thailand promotion, now renamed Gatoh Move Pro Wrestling, held its first official event on May 16. Sakura was assisted by Yoneyama and male wrestler Madoka in training wrestlers for the new promotion. Sakura and Yoneyama, now known collectively as the "Tai-Pan Sisters", returned to JWP on June 17 to make their first successful defense of the JWP Tag Team and Daily Sports Women's Tag Team Championships against the team of Arisa Nakajima and Manami Katsu. Sakura and Yoneyama made their second successful defense on July 15 against the team of Kazuki and Morii, after which they changed their team name from the Tai-Pan Sisters to "Reset". On August 19, Reset lost the titles to Arisa Nakajima and Command Bolshoi in their third title defense.

On September 9, Sakura and Yoneyama defeated Hanako Nakamori and Morii in a tag team match, after which the two agreed to join Reset to form the "Heart Move Kei Reform" (HMK) stable. The first big match between HMK and the JWP Seikigun ("regular army") took place on October 7, when Sakura, Yoneyama, Nakamori and Morii defeated Arisa Nakajima, Command Bolshoi, Kayoko Haruyama and Manami Katsu 3–0 in an eight-woman captain's fall elimination tag team main event. Later that same day, Sakura's former Ice Ribbon protégé Riho, who had recently left Ice Ribbon to rejoin her trainer, made her debut for Gatoh Move, wrestling Sakura to a ten-minute time limit draw at an event in Shinjuku, Tokyo. On October 28, Sakura defeated Kayoko Haruyama to win the JWP Openweight Championship for the first time. Sakura made her first successful defense of the title at Pro-Wrestling: EVE's Wrestle-Fever internet pay-per-view event in Sudbury, Suffolk, England on November 10, 2012, defeating Kay Lee Ray. Later that evening, Sakura would answer an open challenge issued by the Pro-Wrestling: EVE Champion Nikki Storm, leading to Sakura defeating her to win the title. On December 20, Sakura made her first successful defense of the Pro-Wrestling: EVE Championship, wrestling Hiroyo Matsumoto to a twenty-minute time limit draw at a Gatoh Move event in Itabashi, Tokyo. Four days later, Sakura lost the JWP Openweight Championship to Arisa Nakajima in her second defense, ending her reign at just 57 days. The match ended the collaboration between Gatoh Move Pro Wrestling and JWP. While Hanako Nakamori and Morii chose to return to JWP, wrestling their final Gatoh Move matches on January 25, 2013, Kaori Yoneyama instead chose to quit the promotion she had been affiliated with for her entire career and become a freelancer following January 27 in order to be able to continue working for Gatoh Move. On February 2, Sakura returned to England, losing the Pro-Wrestling: EVE Championship back to Nikki Storm. Sakura returned to JWP on April 14, teaming with the debuting Nikki Storm to defeat former stablemates Hanako Nakamori and Morii in a tag team match. On May 11, Sakura defeated DJ Nira at a Gatoh Move event and, as a result, won his "Right to Challenge Anytime, Anywhere" contract, which gives its owner the right to challenge for the DDT Pro-Wrestling promotion's KO-D Openweight Championship. The following day, Sakura made her debut for World Wonder Ring Stardom, wrestling Nanae Takahashi to a fifteen-minute time limit draw. On May 17, before being able to cash it in, Sakura lost the "Right to Challenge Anytime, Anywhere" contract to Sayaka Obihiro. On May 25, Sakura made another trip to England to take part in Pro-Wrestling: EVE's 2013 Queen of the Ring tournament, where she made it to the finals, before losing to Shanna. Also in May, Sakura was involved in a storyline, where she supposedly found the old AWF World Women's Championship at the Hanazono Shrine flea market. She then contacted IWA Japan president Tatsukuni Asano, who bought back the title for ¥2000. On June 1, Sakura returned to her original home promotion, IWA Japan, defeating Kappa Komachi to win the AWF World Women's Championship for the second time, sixteen years after she had won it the first time. She made her first successful defense of the title at a Gatoh Move event on July 15 against old associate Kiyoko Ichiki. Sakura's second successful title defense took place on August 10, when she defeated Welsh wrestler Pollyanna.

On November 16, Sakura defeated Kyonin Shihan to combine the AWF World Women's Championship with the IWA World Heavyweight Championship and IWA World Junior Heavyweight Championships, creating the IWA Triple Crown. From December 22 to 23, Sakura and Riho worked two Wrestle-1 events, wrestling singles matches against each other; Riho won the first and Sakura the second. On December 27 at Gatoh Move's year-end event, Sakura lost the IWA Triple Crown to Antonio Honda. Sakura regained the Triple Crown from Honda on January 25, 2014. On February 23, Sakura made an appearance for DDT, taking part in a ten-person battle royal for the Ironman Heavymetalweight Championship. During the match, Sakura defeated Yasu Urano to become the new champion, but held the title for only 58 seconds, before losing it to DJ Nira. On August 10, Sakura lost the IWA Triple Crown to Konaka=Pehlwan. She regained the title from Konaka on October 4. Despite IWA Japan folding on October 13, Sakura continued defending the IWA Triple Crown Championship, losing it to Riho in her second defense on November 2. On August 13, 2015, Sakura celebrated her 20th anniversary in professional wrestling at Gatoh Move's first ever event in Korakuen Hall, where she teamed with Makoto to defeat Hikaru Shida and Sayaka Obihiro in a tag team match.

On April 23, 2016, Sakura made a surprise return to Ice Ribbon, marking her first appearance for the promotion in over four years. Sakura confronted Tsukasa Fujimoto, who had effectively taken over her role as the face of Ice Ribbon, and stated that it was time to end the promotion. She then revealed herself as Nanae Takahashi's tag team partner in a match against Fujimoto and Arisa Nakajima at Ice Ribbon's 10th anniversary show on May 4. In the match, Sakura was pinned by Fujimoto. On February 18, 2017, Sakura returned to Pro Wrestling: EVE, working two shows in one day, unsuccessfully challenging Rhia O'Reilly for the Pro Wrestling: EVE Championship on the second show. On March 28, 2017, Sakura and Masahiro Takanashi defeated "Kotori" and Riho to win the Asia Dream Tag Team Championship. On August 5, Sakura defeated Riho to win the vacant IWA Triple Crown Championship for the fourth time. Sakura then immediately retired the title and returned it to IWA Japan with Gatoh Move planning to create their own singles title, the Super Asia Championship, to take its place. Sakura and Takanashi lost the Asia Dream Tag Team Championship to Yuna Mizumori and Saki on August 21, 2018.

=== Philippine Wrestling Revolution (2019) ===
On March 17, 2019, Sakura made her debut for the Philippine Wrestling Revolution in which she faced The Queen of Philippine Wrestling, Crystal. Sakura got the win over Crystal via a Diving Moonsault. The two hugged after the match as a sign of respect.

=== All Elite Wrestling (2019–present) ===
On May 25, 2019, Sakura made her debut for All Elite Wrestling (AEW) in a six-woman tag team match at AEW Double or Nothing, teaming with Aja Kong and Yuka Sakazaki in a losing effort against the team of Hikaru Shida, Riho, and Ryo Mizunami. She made her return on October 9 at Dynamite, teaming with Bea Priestley in a losing effort against Britt Baker and Riho. On the October 29 episode of AEW Dark, Sakura picked up her first victory, pinning Penelope Ford in a four-way match that involved Allie and Sadie Gibbs. Sakura would pick up another victory when, at the Thanksgiving Eve special episode of Dynamite on November 27, Sakura teamed up with Bea Priestly to defeat Hikaru Shida and Kris Statlander. At Full Gear, she unsuccessfully challenged Riho for the AEW Women's World Championship.

In February 2021, Sakura, along with her protégé Mei Suruga, were announced as participants in a tournament for the Women's World Championship as part of the Japanese bracket. On February 15, Sakura pinned Venny and advanced to the next round. The following week, she was eliminated by Yuka Sakazaki in the semi-finals. After the match, Sakura attacked Sakazaki with Suruga and Yuna Mizumori who accompanied Sakura to the match, establishing herself as a heel. On July 25, Sakura announced that she is returning to AEW full-time. On the January 28, 2023, episode of Rampage, Sakura fought the Women's World Champion Jamie Hayter in the main event in a losing effort. On the June 2 episode of Rampage, Sakura fought Willow Nightingale for the NJPW Strong Women's Championship, but failed to win the title. On the September 6 episode of Dynamite, Sakura lost to Kris Statlander for the AEW TBS Championship. On the November 29 episode of Dynamite, she had another shot for the TBS Championship against Julia Hart in a House Rules match, but failed to win the title.

On October 8, 2024, at Dynamite: Title Tuesday, Sakura fought Mercedes Moné for both the AEW TBS Championship and the NJPW Strong Women's Championship in a losing effort.

=== Ring of Honor (2023–present) ===
On the March 30, 2023, episode of ROH Honor Club TV, Sakura made her Ring of Honor (ROH) debut facing Athena for the ROH Women's World Championship in a losing effort. After the match, Sakura was attacked by Athena before Yuka Sakazaki arrived to save her.

== Wrestlers trained ==
- Aika Ando
- Akiko Narikuni
- Aoi Kizuki
- Blue Lotus
- Chii Tomiya
- Dorami Nagano
- E.K. Baki
- Emi Fujino
- Fenryu
- Fukin Kitazawa
- Golem Thai
- Hamuko Hoshi
- Haruna Akagi
- Hikari Minami
- Hikaru Shida
- Hinata
- Hiragi Kurumi
- Hono
- Juken
- Kazumi Shimouna
- Ken-chan
- Kinoko
- "Kotori"
- Mai Ichii
- Maki Narumiya
- Makoto
- Meari Naito
- Mei Suruga
- Mickey Raw
- Mika Nagano
- Miki Ishii
- Miku Saotome
- Minori Makiba
- Mitsuru Konno
- Miyako Matsumoto
- Mizuki
- Mochi Miyagi
- Moeka Haruhi
- Neko Nitta
- P-Nutz
- Peppermint
- Ray
- Riho
- Rika Takahashi
- Sayaka Obihiro
- Seina
- Suzuka
- Tamako
- Tsukasa Fujimoto
- Tsukushi
- Yumiko Inoue

== Championships and accomplishments ==
- All Japan Women's Pro-Wrestling
  - AJW Championship (1 time)
- Deadlock Pro-Wrestling
  - DPW Women's Worlds Championship (1 time)
- Dramatic Dream Team / DDT Pro-Wrestling
  - Ironman Heavymetalweight Championship (5 times)
- Gatoh MoveProWrestling/ChocoPro
  - Super Asia Championship (2 times, current)
  - Asia Dream Tag Team Championship (3 times) – with Kaori Yoneyama (1) and Masahiro Takanashi (2)
- Ice Ribbon
  - ICE×60 Championship (2 times)
  - Ice Ribbon 24 no Hitomi Championship (1 time)
  - International Ribbon Tag Team Championship (5 times) – with Kaori Yoneyama (1), Nanae Takahashi (1), Ray (1), Makoto (1), and Tsukushi (1)
- International Wrestling Association of Japan
  - AWF World Women's Championship (2 times)
  - IWA Triple Crown Championship (4 times)
  - IWA World Heavyweight Championship (1 time)
  - IWA World Junior Heavyweight Championship (1 time)
- JWP Joshi Puroresu
  - Daily Sports Women's Tag Team Championship (2 times) – with Kaori Yoneyama
  - JWP Openweight Championship (1 time)
  - JWP Tag Team Championship (2 times) – with Kaori Yoneyama
  - JWP Year-End Award (3 times)
    - Best Bout Award (2012) with Kaori Yoneyama vs. Arisa Nakajima and Command Bolshoi on August 19
    - Enemy Award (2009, 2012)
- NEO Japan Ladies Pro Wrestling
  - NEO Single Championship (1 time)
  - NEO Tag Team Championship (1 time) – with Yoshiko Tamura
  - NWA Women's Pacific Championship (1 time)
  - Mid Summer Tag Tournament VIII (2009) – with Nanae Takahashi
- Nikkan Sports
  - Joshi Puroresu Best Bout Award (2009) vs. Yoshiko Tamura on May 9
  - Joshi Puroresu Best Tag Team Award (2009) with Kaori Yoneyama
  - Joshi Puroresu MVP Award (2009)
- Pro-Wrestling: EVE
  - Pro-Wrestling: EVE Championship (1 time)
  - Hall of Fame (2023)
- Pro Wrestling Illustrated
  - Ranked No. 87 of the top 250 female singles wrestlers in the PWI Women's 250 in 2023
  - Ranked No. 429 of the top 500 singles wrestlers in the PWI 500 in 2021
- Three Count Wrestling
  - Three Count Women’s Championship (1 time)
- Tokyo Sports
  - Joshi Puroresu Grand Prize (2009)

== Luchas de Apuestas record ==
Winner (wager)	Loser (wager)	Location	Event	Date	Notes
Kaori Yoneyama (championship and hair)	Emi Sakura (hair)	Tokyo, Japan	JWP Revolution	September 19, 2010	
