= Madoka (wrestler) =

Japanese professional wrestler (born 1983)

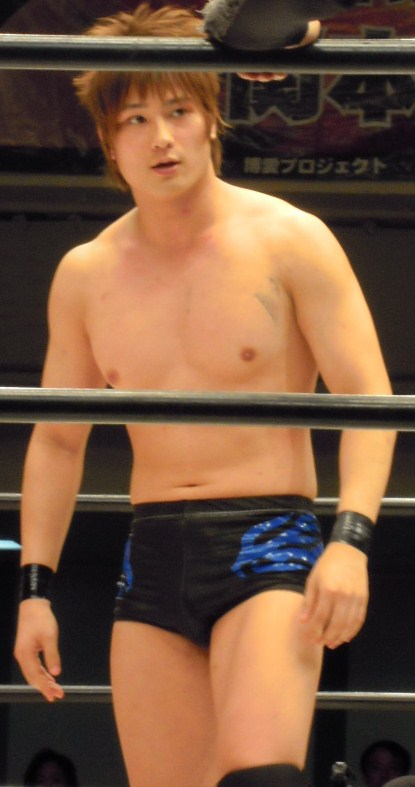

Personal information
- Born: Yuki Yagi; December 12, 1983 (age 42) Matsuyama, Ehime

Professional wrestling career
- Ring name(s): Balrog; Hagane Shinno; Madoka; Makai Heat; M.D.K. Mr. X3; Silver Wolf; Space Lone Wolf; SUPER-X; Yasunari Ochi
- Billed height: 1.77 m (5 ft 10 in)
- Billed weight: 80 kg (176 lb)
- Trained by: Kaientai Dojo; Taka Michinoku
- Debut: February 20, 2002

Yuki Yagi (八木 由貴, Yagi Yūki) (born December 12, 1983) is a Japanese professional wrestler better known by the ring name Madoka (円華). He is mostly known for his work in Kaientai Dojo and currently works for Big Japan Pro Wrestling (BJW) under the name Hagane Shinno (新納 刃, Shinnō Hagane). He also makes appearances in American promotions such as All Elite Wrestling in 2022.

== Championships and accomplishments ==
- Big Japan Pro Wrestling
  - BJW World Tag Team Championship (1 time) – with Kengo Mashimo
- DDT Pro-Wrestling
  - GWC 6-Man Tag Team Championship (1 time) – with Asuka and Shinichiro Tominaga
  - Independent World Junior Heavyweight Championship (1 time)
- Gatoh Move Pro Wrestling
  - Super Asia Championship (1 time, current)
  - Asia Dream Tag Team Championship (1 time) — with Chie Koishikawa
  - Go Go! Green Curry Khob Khun Cup (2014) – with Kaori Yoneyama
  - Go Go! Green Curry Khob Khun Cup (2015) – with Mizuki
- Global Professional Wrestling Alliance
  - Differ Cup Tag Team tournament (2007) – with Kengo Mashimo
- Kaientai Dojo
  - Independent World Junior Heavyweight Championship (1 time)
  - Strongest-K Tag Team Championship (1 time) – with Kengo Mashimo
  - UWA/UWF Intercontinental Tag Team Championship (1 time) – with Mike Lee, Jr.
  - UWA World Middleweight Championship (1 time)
  - Kaientai Dojo Tag League (2007 and 2008) – with Kengo Mashimo
  - K-Survivor Tournament (2003) - with Kengo Mashimo, Miyawaki, Kunio Toshima, Mike Lee, Jr. and Yuu Yamagata
  - Tag Team Match of the Year (2006) with Kengo Mashimo vs. JOE and Yasu Urano on December 10
  - Tag Team Match of the Year (2007) with Kota Ibushi vs. Dick Togo and Taka Michinoku on December 1
- Pro Wrestling Illustrated
  - Ranked No. 466 of the top 500 singles wrestlers in the PWI 500 in 2023
