= Yusuke Kubo =

Japanese professional wrestler

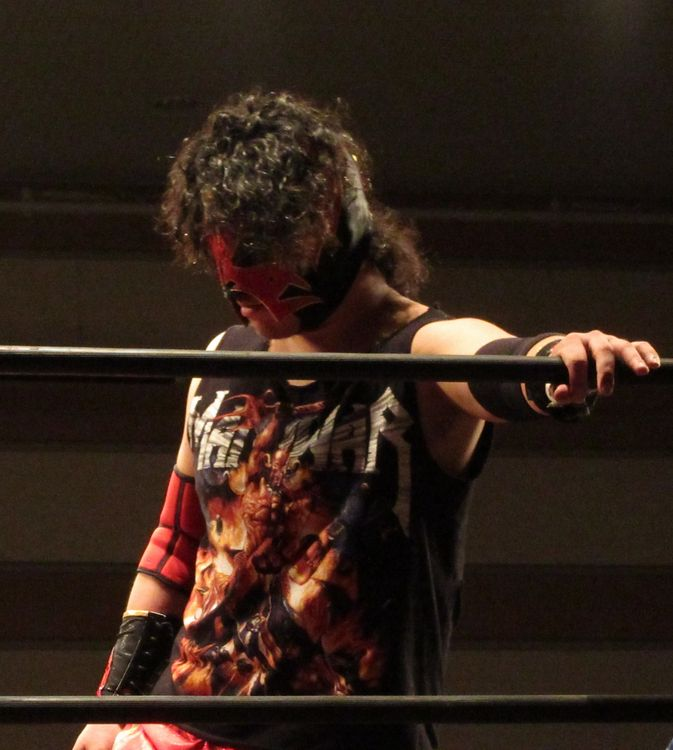
- Kubo in May 2016

Personal information
- Born: February 15, 1987 (age 39) Isa, Japan

Professional wrestling career
- Ring name(s): Goro Jr. Goro Junior; Yusuke Kubo; Kubito; Yusuke Shiranami
- Billed height: 172 cm (5 ft 8 in)
- Billed weight: 80 kg (176 lb)
- Trained by: Dick Togo; Ryota Chikuzen
- Debut: 2006

Yusuke Kubo (久保 佑允, Kubo Yūsuke; born February 15, 1987) is a Japanese professional wrestler currently working for the Japanese promotion Pro-Wrestling Basara under the ring name Kubito (stylized in all caps). He is also known for his tenure with DDT Pro-Wrestling.

== Professional wrestling career ==
=== Independent circuit (2006–present) ===
Kubo has worked as a freelancer most of his career, competing in various promotions from the Japanese independent scene. On the ninth night of The Gate Of Victory from March 15, 2010, an event promotee by Dragon Gate, he teamed up with Mentai Kid in a losing effort against Knesuka (K-ness and Susumu Yokosuka). On the fifth night of the Noah The First Navigation 2013 from January 22, he competed in a ten-man battle royal won by Marshall Von Erich and also involving his brother Ross Von Erich, Harlem Bravado and Lance Bravado, Hitoshi Kumano, Takaaki Watanabe, Yoshinari Ogawa and others. At Gatoh Move Japan Tour #322, an event promoted by Gatoh Move Pro Wrestling on November 12, 2017, he teamed up with Kaho Kobayashi to defeat Riho and Taro Yamada in a mixed tag team match.

=== DDT Pro-Wrestling (2006–2020) ===
Kubo made his professional wrestling debut in DDT Pro-Wrestling at DDT Union Pro, an event promoted on June 18, 2006, where he teamed up with Kenshin and Riki Sensyu to defeat 726, Kazuhiko Matsuzaki and Yuki Sato in a six-man tag team match.

He competed in several signature events of the promotion such as the DDT Judgement branch, making his first appearance at Judgement 2016: DDT 19th Anniversary on March 21, where he teamed up with his "World Heaviest Heavy Metal Tag/Iron Priest" tag team partner Fuma and Sagat to defeat Takumi Tsukamoto, Daichi Kazato and Gouma Ryu. He also competed in regular shows such as the DDT Tavern Pro Wrestling Alcohol Mania 2017 from March 23, where he competed in a five-way match won by Joey Ryan and also involving Cherry, Sayaka Obihiro, and Tatsuhiko Yoshino.

=== Pro-Wrestling Basara (2016–present) ===
Kubo is mainly known for competing in Pro-Wrestling Basara, starting by the time when the company was still a satellite promotion under DDT's patronage. He is currently part of the "Iron Priest" stable. Kubo made his first appearance at DDT BASARA Raising An Army ~Stake Everything~ on January 21, 2016, where he fell short to Hi69 as a result of a singles match. He soon started to chase for various titles. At DDT BASARA Vol. 3 on February 26, 2016, he unsuccessfully challenged Shiori Asahi for the Independent World Junior Heavyweight Championship. He eventually won his first title in the company, the Iron Fist Tag Team Championship alongside Fuma by defeating Sento Minzoku (Daiki Shimomura and Isami Kodaka) in the finals of a tournament to become the inaugural champions. At BASARA 90 Itto Ryodan, Kubo teamed up with Fuma and Sagat and defeated Abdullah Kobayashi, Hideki Suzuki and Yoshihisa Uto to win the Yokohama Shopping Street 6-Man Tag Team Championship, a title owned by Big Japan Pro Wrestling which was shortly contested in Basara. At BASARA 147 ~ Glitter ~ on January 26, 2021, he unsuccessfully challenged Takumi Tsukamoto for the Union Max Championship. At BASARA 207 ~ Takagari 14 on December 17, 2022, he competed in a battle royal won by Fuminori Abe and also involving Daiki Shimomura, Sagat, Trans-Am Hiroshi, Masato Kamino, Takato Nakano and many others.

Kubo competed in a couple of the promotion's signature events such as the "Heaven Summit Itadaki", making his first appearance at the first-ever edition of the tournament from 2016, where he fought in the block A where he scored a total of four points after going against Isami Kodaka, Ryota Nakatsu, Sagat and Ryuichi Sekine.

== Championships and accomplishments ==
- Big Japan Pro Wrestling
  - Yokohama Shopping Street 6-Man Tag Team Championship (1 time) – with Fuma and Sagat
- DDT Pro-Wrestling
  - Ironman Heavymetalweight Championship (1 time)
- Pro-Wrestling Basara
  - Iron Fist Tag Team Championship (1 time) – with Fuma
  - Iron Fist Tag Tournament (2019) – with Fuma
