= Takato Nakano =

Japanese professional wrestler

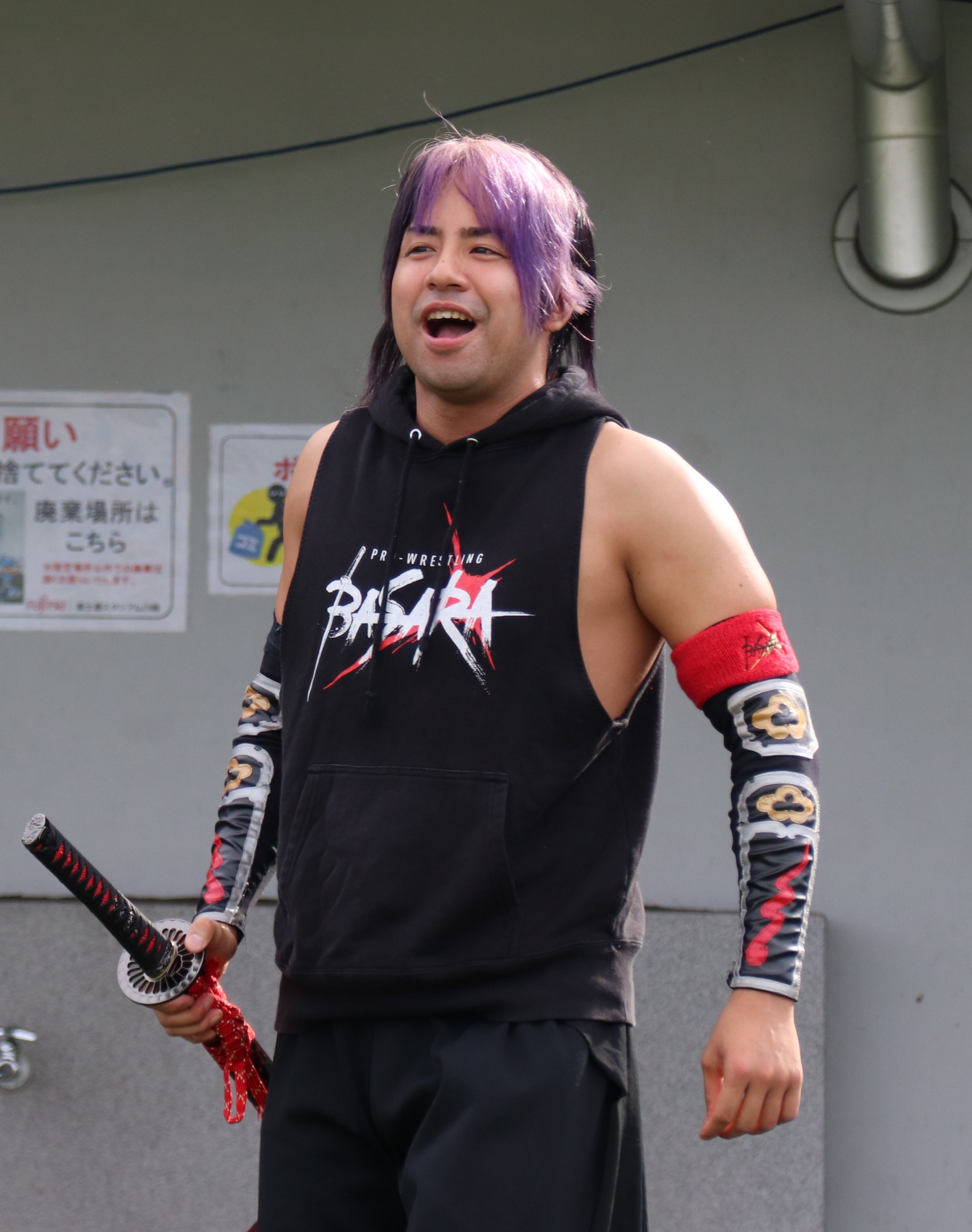
- Nakano in August 2021

Personal information
- Born: December 6, 1994 (age 31) Kurashiki, Japan

Professional wrestling career
- Ring name(s): Takato Nakano; Stanley Nakano; Trans-Am*Hiroshi #9
- Billed height: 163 cm (5 ft 4 in)
- Billed weight: 70 kg (154 lb)
- Trained by: Animal Hamaguchi
- Debut: 2017

Takato Nakano (中野貴人, Nakano Takato) is a Japanese professional wrestler. He is currently performing on the Japanese promotion Pro-Wrestling Basara where former two-time Iron Fist Tag Team Champion.

== Professional wrestling career ==
=== Independent circuit (2017–present) ===
Due to partially being a freelancer, Nakano is known for competing in various promotions of the Japanese independent scene. At TJPW Yokodai Station Pro Wrestling 2018, an event promoted by Tokyo Joshi Pro Wrestling on March 31, Nakano competed twice, first in a singles match in which he went into a time-limit draw against Isami Kodaka, and secondly in a four-way match won by Sagat and also involving Kodaka and Ryuichi Sekine. At WAVE Summer Fiesta 2018 ~ Rakuen Baby!, an event promoted by Pro Wrestling Wave on August 2, he teamed up with Koju Takeda to defeat Keisuke Goto and Leo Isaka. On the sixth night of the 2022 edition of Big Japan Pro Wrestling's Saikyo Tag League, Nakano teamed up with Masato Kamino and Ryota Nakatsu, and competed in a six-man tag team match from outside of the tournament in which they defeated Kota Sekifuda, Takuho Kato and Yuya Aoki.

=== DDT Pro-Wrestling (2017–present) ===
Despite mainly competing in the Basara branch/promotion, Nakano made various appearances in DDT. He competed in several of the promotion's signature events such as the DDT Judgement series in which he made his first appearance at the 2018 edition from March 25, where he teamed up with Gran MilliMeters (Daiki Shimomura and Nobuhiro Shimatani), Mizuki Watase and Rekka in a losing effort against Cherry, Gota Ihashi, Hoshitango, Mad Paulie and Tomomitsu Matsunaga in a dark match. At Judgement 2019: DDT 22nd Anniversary on February 17, he teamed up with Masato Kamino in a losing effort against Sento Minzoku (Ryuichi Sekine and Daiki Shimomura). Another branch of events in which he competed was the DDT Ultimate Party, making his first appearance at the 2019 edition from November 3, where he alongside Takumi Tsukamoto and Yasu Urano successfully defended the UWA World Trios Championship against Damnation (Tetsuya Endo, Mad Paulie and Nobuhiro Shimatani) and Ken Ohka, Yumehito Imanari and Miss Mongol in a three-way match.

==== Pro-Wrestling Basara (2017–present) ====
Nakano made his professional wrestling debut in Pro-Wrestling Basara by the time the promotion was still under the jurisdiction of DDT Pro-Wrestling. He made his first appearance at DDT BASARA 34 ~ Shishifunjin ~ on April 29, 2017, where he fell short to Isami Kodaka in singles competition. During his time on the promotion, he chased for several championships promoted by it. Nakano is a former UWA World Trios Champion, title which he won with Takumi Tsukamoto and Yasu Urano by defeating Sento Minzoku (Daiki Shimomura, Isami Kodaka and Ryuichi Sekine) at DDT Basara 105: The 2nd Fox Prince on September 14, 2019. He is also a two-time Iron Fist Tag Team Champion, title which he won most recently with Masato Kamino as "Aijin Tag" at Basara 211: Oji No Kitsune 24 on February 18, 2023, by defeating Sento Minzoku (Isami Kodaka and Daiki Shimomura). At BASARA 212 ~ Koo ~ on February 28, 2023, Nakano unsuccessfully challenged Isami Kodaka for the Union Max Championship. At BASARA 154 ~ Shakujikawa on April 10, 2021, he unsuccessfully challenged Isami Kodaka for the BJW Junior Heavyweight Championship.

Nakano competed in the Heaven Summit Itadaki, the promotion's biggest annual tournament. His most recent performance took place at the 2022 edition of the event where he defeated Sagat in the first rounds but fell short to tag team partner Masato Kamino in the second ones.

=== All Japan Pro Wrestling (2021–2022) ===
Nakano shared a brief tenure with All Japan Pro Wrestling, working as developmental talent. He made his first appearance at the 2021 edition of the AJPW Junior Tag League where he teamed up with Masato Kamino in a losing effort against Total Eclipse (Hokuto Omori and Yusuke Kodama) in the first rounds. He once competed in the promotion's first pay-per-view of the year, the AJPW New Year Wars 2022, where he made his first appearance on the third night from January 23, teaming up with Dan Tamura, Kazumasa Yoshida, Ren Ayabe and Shigehiro Irie in a losing effort against Andy Wu, Black Menso-re, Ryo Inoue, Shuji Ishikawa and Takao Omori. On the second night of the AJPW Excite Series 2022 from February 17, Nakano teamed up with Masato Kamino to unsuccessfully challenge Total Eclipse (Hokuto Omori and Yusuke Kodama) for the All Asia Tag Team Championship.

== Championships and accomplishments ==
- Big Japan Pro Wrestling
  - UWA World Tag Team Championship (1 time) – with Masato Kamino
- Pro-Wrestling Basara
  - Iron Fist Tag Team Championship (3 times, current) – with Masato Kamino
  - UWA World Trios Championship (1 time) – with Takumi Tsukamoto and Yasu Urano
  - Iron Fist Tag Tournament (2025) – with Masato Kamino
