= Masato Kamino =

Japanese professional wrestler

Personal information
- Born: 6 June 1994 (age 32) Nara, Japan

Professional wrestling career
- Ring name: Marilyn Kamino Masato Kamino
- Billed height: 175 cm (5 ft 9 in)
- Billed weight: 82 kg (181 lb)
- Debut: 2017

Masato Kamino (神野聖人, Kamino Masato) is a Japanese professional wrestler currently performing in the Japanese promotion Pro-Wrestling Basara where he is a former Iron Fist Tag Team Champion.

== Professional wrestling career ==
=== DDT Pro-Wrestling (2017–2019) ===
Kamino made his professional wrestling debut in DDT Pro-Wrestling at DDT Beer Garden Fight 2017 on 5 August, where he teamed up with Rekka in a losing effort against Gran MilliMeters (Daiki Shimomura and Nobuhiro Shimatani) in tag team competition.

He competed in various signature events of the promotion such as the DDT Peter Pan branch of events, in which he made his first appearance at the 2017 edition from 20 August, where he teamed up with Tomomitsu Matsunaga, Hoshitango and Nobuhiro Shimatani in a losing effort against Mizuki Watase, Rekka, Diego and Daiki Shimomura. In the DDT Judgement branch, Kamino made his first appearance at the 2019 edition from 17 February, where he teamed up with Takato Nakano in a losing effort against Sento Minzoku (Ryuichi Sekine and Daiki Shimomura). At Ultimate Party 2019 on 3 November, Kamino teamed up with Daichi Kazato and Shuhei Washida to defeat Tomomitsu Matsunaga, Mizuki Watase and Keigo Nakamura.

=== Pro-Wrestling Basara (2018–present) ===
Kamino competed in Pro-Wrestling Basara sincer 2018, by the time the promotion was still under DDT's jurisdiction. On 11 June 2019, it was announced Basara would be splitting up from DDT and become an independent company starting 1 January 2020. Kamino alongside various of the time's DDT roster members transferred to the newly independent Basara.

In Basara, Kamino mainly competes as a tag team wrestler alongside his long time "Aijin Tag" team partner Takato Nakano. They won the Iron Fist Tag Team Championship on two separate occasions. First at Basara 199: Kō on 6 September 2022, by defeating Speed of Sounds (Banana Senga and Tsutomu Oosugi), and secondly at Basara 211: Oji No Kitsune 24 on 18 February 2023, by defeating Sento Minzoku (Isami Kodaka and Daiki Shimomura). At Basara 244 ~ Utage on 19 March 2024, Kamino unsuccessfully challenged Minoru Fujita for the Union Max Championship.

=== All Japan Pro Wrestling (2021–2022) ===
Kamino shared a stint tenure with All Japan Pro Wrestling (AJPW). He made his debut in the 2021 edition of the AJPW Junior Tag League where he competed alongside "Aijin Tag" team partner Takato Nakano. They fell short to Total Eclipse (Hokuto Omori and Yusuke Kodama) in the first rounds. Several weeks later at AJPW Excite Series 2022 on 17 February, Kamino and Nakano unsuccessfully challenged Omori and Kodama for the All Asia Tag Team Championship.

=== Gleat (2022–present) ===
Kamino also regularly competes in Gleat. He made his debut at GLEAT G PROWRESTLING Ver. 20 on 23 March 2022, where he teamed up with TiiiDA in a losing effort against Leo Isaka and Yu Iizuka. At GLEAT G PROWRESTLING Ver. 38 on 19 November 2022, Kamino teamed up with Takanori Ito and unsuccessfully challgned reigning champions Bulk Orchestra (Check Shimatani and Hayato Tamura), and Strong Hearts (Shigehiro Irie and T-Hawk) for the interim G-Infinity Championship. At GLEAT G PROWRESTLING Ver. 64 ~ Burn Your Heart on 12 November 2023, Kamino unsuccessfully challenged T-Hawk for the G-Rex Championship.

In Gleat, Kamino was part of the Yan's Family unit founded by Kaz Hayashi between 2023 and 2024.

== Championships and accomplishments ==
- Big Japan Pro Wrestling
  - UWA World Tag Team Championship (1 time) – with Takato Nakano
- Pro-Wrestling Basara
  - Iron Fist Tag Team Championship (3 times, current) – with Takato Nakano
  - Union Max Championship (1 time)
  - Iron Fist Tag Tournament (2025) – with Takato Nakano
