= Iron Fist Tag Tournament =

Pro-Wrestling Basara event series

- Promotions: DDT (2016–2019); Basara (2020–present)
- First event: 2016
- Event gimmick: Single elimination tag team tournament

The Iron Fist Tag Tournament (Japanese: IRON FISTタッグトーナメント, Hepburn: Aian Fisuto Taggu Tōnamento; IFTT) is a recurring professional wrestling tag team tournament held by Pro-Wrestling Basara. Established in 2016, it is a single elimination tournament that usually features eight teams.

== History ==
On October 7, 2015, DDT Pro-Wrestling announced the formation of its new Pro-Wrestling Basara brand, led by Isami Kodaka, as a replacement for Union Pro Wrestling (UPW), which had officially folded three days earlier. In September 2016, DDT announced the first Iron Fist Tag Tournament for the Basara brand, to be held between October 5 and October 29.

The 2019 edition crowned the inaugural Iron Fist Tag Team Champions. On January 1, 2020, Basara became independent from DDT.

The tournament was brought back in 2023. This edition was marked by the withdrawal of the Iron Fist Tag Team Champions, Daiki Shimomura and Minoru Fujita, and the subsequent vacancy of their title, due to Shimomura's one-year suspension. The eventual winners, Harimau (Ryota Nakatsu and Kazusada Higuchi), were then crowned champions.

== Tournament finals ==
No.	Event	Date	City	Venue	Final	Ref.
1	Basara 21: Banriikkū	October 29, 2016	Yokohama	Radiant Hall	Fuma and Yusuke Kubo vs. Isami Kodaka and Takumi Tsukamoto	
2	Basara 60: Utage	February 19, 2018	Tokyo	Shin-Kiba 1st Ring	Ryuichi Sekine and Ryota Nakatsu vs. Fuma and Sagat	
3	Basara 109: Utage	October 23, 2019	Tokyo	Shin-Kiba 1st Ring	Fuma and Yusuke Kubo vs. Isami Kodaka and Daiki Shimomura	
4	Basara 144: Kō	December 22, 2020	Tokyo	Shin-Kiba 1st Ring	Isami Kodaka and Daiki Shimomura vs. Ryota Nakatsu and Sagat	
5	Basara 235: Utage	November 7, 2023	Tokyo	Shin-Kiba 1st Ring	Ryota Nakatsu and Kazusaga Higuchi vs. Takumi Tsukamoto and Sagat	
6	Basara 290: Utage	October 15, 2025	Tokyo	Shin-Kiba 1st Ring	Takato Nakano and Masato Kamino vs. Kyu Mogami and Naka Shuma	
7	Basara 318: Takagari	October 12, 2026	Tokyo	Takashimadaira Kumin Center	Daiki Shimomura and Shuichiro Katsumura vs. Lil Kraken and Sagat	

== Tournaments ==
Year	Winners	Won	Teams
2016	Aldini Brothers (Isami Kodaka and Takumi Tsukamoto)	1	8
2018	Cavalry (Ryuichi Sekine and Ryota Nakatsu)	1	8
2019	Iron Priest (Fuma and Yusuke Kubo)	1	8
2020	Sento Minzoku (Isami Kodaka and Daiki Shimomura)	1 (2, 1)	8
2023	Harimau (Ryota Nakatsu and Kazusada Higuchi)	1 (2, 1)	10
2025	Aijin Tag (Takato Nakano and Masato Kamino)	1	8
2026	Daiki Shimomura and Shuichiro Katsumura	1 (2, 1)	8

== Results ==
=== 2016 ===
The first edition of the Iron Fist Tag Tournament was an eight-team single elimination tournament, held between October 5 and October 29, 2016. Shinjiro Otani was originally scheduled to team with Sean Guinness and represent Pro Wrestling Zero1 in the tournament, but he had to withdraw due to an injury and was replaced by Ikuto Hidaka.

Round 1 Basara 20 (October 5)
Daichi Kazato and Tomoya Kawamura	13:05
Trans-Am★Hiroshi and Sagat	Pin
Koji Iwamoto and Fuminori Abe	16:42
Fuma and Yusuke Kubo	Pin
Ryuichi Sekine and Ryota Nakatsu	Sub
Gouma Ryu and Masamune	13:14
Ikuto Hidaka and Sean Guinness	20:53
Isami Kodaka and Takumi Tsukamoto	Pin

Semifinals; Basara 21 (October 29)
Trans-Am★Hiroshi and Sagat	11:23
Fuma and Yusuke Kubo	Pin
Ryuichi Sekine and Ryota Nakatsu	12:21
Isami Kodaka and Takumi Tsukamoto	Pin

Final; Basara 21 (October 29)
Fuma and Yusuke Kubo	23:07
Isami Kodaka and Takumi Tsukamoto	Pin

=== 2018 ===
The second edition of the tournament was held between February 11 and February 19, 2018.

Round 1 Basara 59 (February 11)
Takumi Tsukamoto and Yasu Urano	27:41
Ryuichi Sekine and Ryota Nakatsu	Sub
Manabu Hara and Fuminori Abe	Sub
Trans-Am★Ryuichi and Yusuke Kubo	16:01
Fuma and Sagat	Pin
Takato Nakano and Akiyori Takizawa	11:55
Best Stretchman V3 and Tsutomu Oosugi	Pin
Isami Kodaka and Yoshihisa Uto	13:16

Semifinals; Basara 60 (February 19)
Ryuichi Sekine and Ryota Nakatsu	Sub
Manabu Hara and Fuminori Abe	12:11
Fuma and Sagat	Pin
Best Stretchman V3 and Tsutomu Oosugi	8:18

Final; Basara 60 (February 19)
Ryuichi Sekine and Ryota Nakatsu	Pin
Fuma and Sagat	19:16

=== 2019 ===
The third edition of the tournament was held between October 13 and October 23, 2019. The tournament crowned the inaugural Iron Fist Tag Team Champions before Basara went independent on January 1, 2020.

Round 1 Basara 107, Basara 108 (October 13)
Isami Kodaka and Daiki Shimomura	Pin
Ryota Nakatsu and Akiyori Takizawa	16:38
Trans-Am★Hiroshi and Sagat	Sub
Daichi Kazato and Masato Kamino	16:58
Fuma and Yusuke Kubo	TKO
Takumi Tsukamoto and Yasu Urano	21:55
Ryuichi Sekine and Minoru Fujita	12:18
Fuminori Abe and Takato Nakano	Pin

Semifinals; Basara 109 (October 23)
Isami Kodaka and Daiki Shimomura	Pin
Trans-Am★Hiroshi and Sagat	6:54
Fuma and Yusuke Kubo	Pin
Fuminori Abe and Takato Nakano	12:00

Final; Basara 109 (October 23)
Isami Kodaka and Daiki Shimomura	21:05
Fuma and Yusuke Kubo	Pin

=== 2020 ===
The fourth edition of the tournament was held between November 10 and December 22, 2020.

Round 1 Basara 139 (November 10); Basara 140 (November 14)
Fuma and Yusuke Kubo	Sub
Trans-Am★Hiroshi and Daichi Kazato	13:41
Block A
Isami Kodaka and Daiki Shimomura	Sub
Takato Nakano and Masato Kamino	18:26
Fuminori Abe and Tetsuo Usui	16:16
Ryuichi Sekine and Minoru Fujita	Sub
Block B
Takumi Tsukamoto and Yasu Urano	17:25
Ryota Nakatsu and Sagat	Pin

Semifinals; Basara 143 (December 7)
Fuma and Yusuke Kubo	16:06
Isami Kodaka and Daiki Shimomura	Pin
Ryuichi Sekine and Minoru Fujita	17:03
Ryota Nakatsu and Sagat	Pin

Final; Basara 144 (December 22)
Isami Kodaka and Daiki Shimomura	Pin
Ryota Nakatsu and Sagat	20:26

=== 2023 ===
The fifth edition of the tournament was held between October 7 and November 7, 2023. It featured ten teams, two of which got a bye into the second round. On October 20, between the first and second rounds, Daiki Shimomura received a one-year suspension for inappropriate conduct. The following day, Shimomura and his partner, Minoru Fujita – who were the Iron Fist Tag Team Champions and had qualified for the semifinals at the time – forfeited the rest of the tournament and vacated the title. Consequently, Takumi Tsukamoto and Sagat received a bye in the final, and it was announced that the tournament winners would be crowned champions.

Round 1 Basara 232, Basara 233 (October 7)
Tsutomu Oosugi and Banana Senga	16:41
Trans-Am★Hiroshi and Daichi Kazato	Pin
Isami Kodaka and Gouma Ryu	10:58
Yasu Urano and Antonio Honda	Sub
Daiki Shimomura and Minoru Fujita	Pin
Fuma and Kubito	16:20
Takumi Tsukamoto and Sagat	Pin
Takato Nakano and Masato Kamino	13:49

Round 2 Basara 234 (October 24)
Ryota Nakatsu and Kazusada Higuchi	Pin
Trans-Am★Hiroshi and Daichi Kazato	14:58
Takumi Tsukamoto and Sagat	Pin
Lil Kraken and Leo Isaka	12:50

Semifinals; Basara 235 (November 7)
Ryota Nakatsu and Kazusada Higuchi	Sub
Yasu Urano and Antonio Honda	10:49
Daiki Shimomura and Minoru Fujita	—
Takumi Tsukamoto and Sagat	Forfeit

Final; Basara 235 (November 7)
Ryota Nakatsu and Kazusada Higuchi	Pin
Takumi Tsukamoto and Sagat	18:09

=== 2025 ===
The sixth edition of the tournament was held between October 2 and October 15, 2025.

Round 1 Basara 289 (October 2)
Trans-Am★Hiroshi and Tsutomu Oosugi	11:47
Ryota Nakatsu and Daichi Kazato	Pin
Block A
Takeru Inoue and Tomoki Hatano	15:59
Takato Nakano and Masato Kamino	Pin
Daiki Shimomura and Lil Kraken	10:47
Kyu Mogami and Naka Shuma	Pin
Block B
Isami Kodaka and Takumi Tsukamoto	10:47
Ryuichi Sekine and Fuma	Sub

Semifinals; Basara 290 (October 15)
Ryota Nakatsu and Daichi Kazato	11:01
Takato Nakano and Masato Kamino	Pin
Kyu Mogami and Naka Shuma	DQ
Ryuichi Sekine and Fuma	11:26

Final; Basara 290 (October 15)
Takato Nakano and Masato Kamino	Pin
Kyu Mogami and Naka Shuma	18:30

=== 2026 ===
The seventh edition of the tournament was held between October 2 and October 12, 2026.

Round 1 Basara 317 (October 2)
Daiki Shimomura and Shuichiro Katsumura	Pin
Fuma and Isami Kodaka	16:30
Masato Kamino and Takato Nakano	14:11
Ayato Yoshida and Daichi Kazato	Pin
Ryota Nakatsu and Shota Nakagawa	Pin
Takeru Inoue and Tomoki Hatano	12:16
Judo Master and Muscle Master	12:23
Super Family (Lil Kraken and Sagat)	Pin

Semifinals; Basara 317 (October 2)
Daiki Shimomura and Shuichiro Katsumura	N/A
Bye
Ryota Nakatsu and Shota Nakagawa	11:40
Super Family (Lil Kraken and Sagat)	Pin

Final; Basara 318 (October 12)
Daiki Shimomura and Shuichiro Katsumura	Pin
Lil Kraken and Sagat	14:01

== See also ==
- Pro-Wrestling Basara
- DDT Pro-Wrestling
