= Fuma (wrestler) =

Japanese professional wrestler

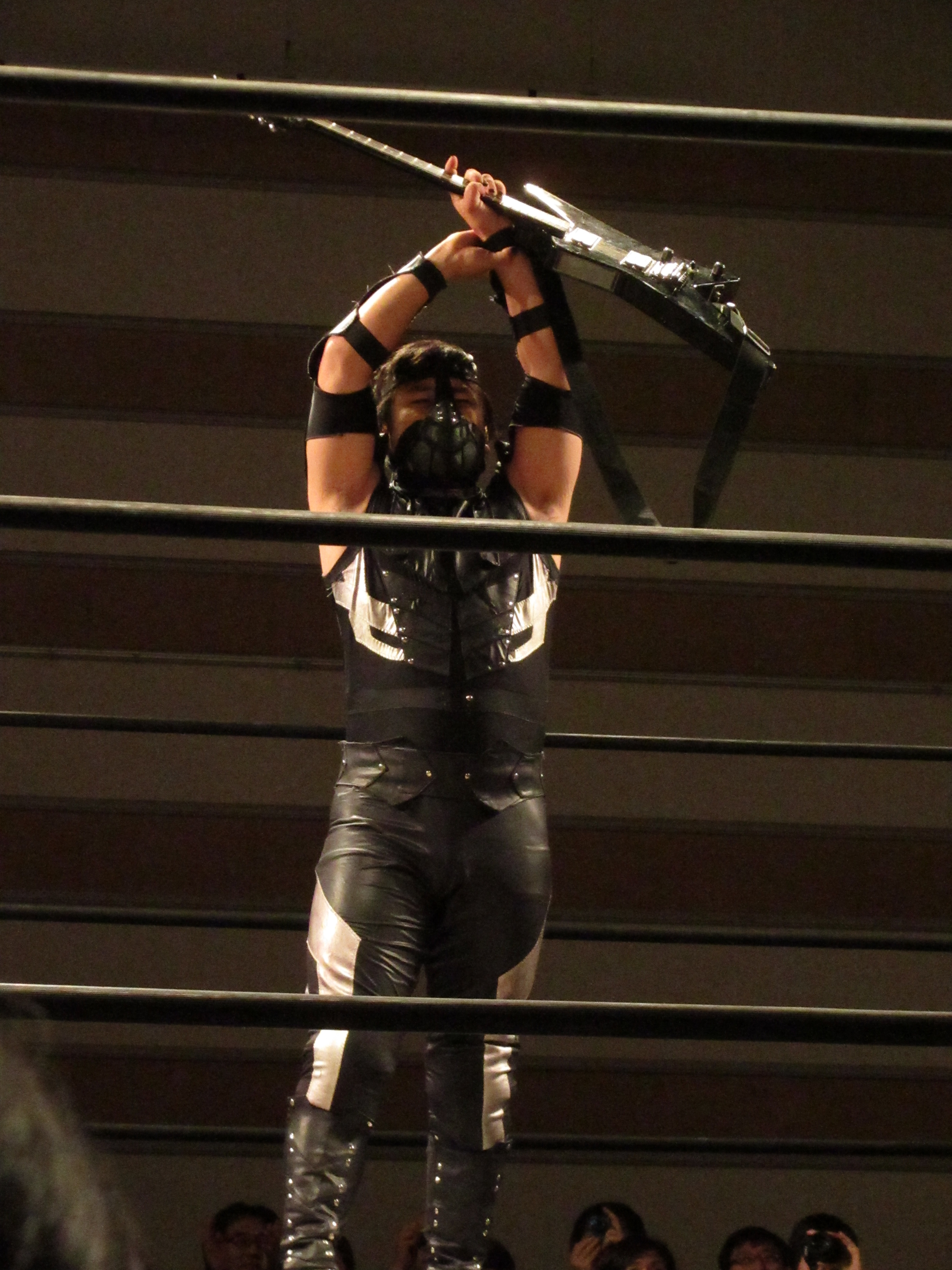
- Fuma in May 2016

Personal information
- Born: June 4, 1986 (age 40) Odawara, Japan

Professional wrestling career
- Ring name(s): FUMA; Fuma; Hiroo Tsumaki inbeizamen Trans-Am*Hiroshi #3
- Billed height: 174 cm (5 ft 9 in)
- Billed weight: 90 kg (198 lb)
- Debut: 2010

Hiroo Tsumaki (妻木洋夫, Tsumaki Hiroo) better known by his ring name Fuma (sometimes stylized in capital letters as FUMA) is a Japanese professional wrestler currently signed to the Japanese promotion Pro-Wrestling Basara. He is also known for his tenure with DDT Pro-Wrestling and Big Japan Pro Wrestling.

== Professional wrestling career ==
=== Independent circuit (2010–present) ===
Tsumaki has worked as a freelancer most of his career, competing in various promotions from the Japanese independent scene. On the fifth night of the Wrestle-1 Tour 2017 Triumph from May 20, Tsumaki teamed up with Andy Wu to defeat Jun Tonsho and Seiki Yoshioka. On the third night of the 2022 edition of Big Japan Pro Wrestling's Ikkitousen Strong Climb, Tsumaki competed out of the actual competition and teamed up with Daiki Shimomura and Takato Nakano in a losing effort against Kazuki Hashimoto, Kota Sekifuda and Tatsuhiko Yoshino. On the third night of All Japan Pro Wrestling's Excite Series 2023 from February 26, he teamed up with Ryoji Sai and Yoshitatsu to defeat Black Menso-re, Kotaro Suzuki and Takao Omori in a six-man tag team match.

=== DDT Pro-Wrestling (2010–2021) ===
Tsumaki made his debut in DDT Pro-Wrestling on August 2, 2010, at DDT Beer Garden Pro-Wrestling where he fell short to Ryuichi Sekine in a singles match.

He competed in several signature events of the promotion both before and after moving to the Basara roster. In the DDT Ultimate Party branch, he made his first appearance at the first-ever edition from 2019 where he teamed up with Yusuke Kubo ad "Iron Priest" and competed in a Four-way hardcore match for the KO-D Tag Team Championship in which the reigning champions Damnation (Daisuke Sasaki and Soma Takao) retained the titles over them and All Out (Akito and Shunma Katsumata), and Sento Minzoku (Minoru Fujita and Daiki Shimomura).

As for the DDT Peter Pan branch, he made his first appearance at the 2012 edition of the Budokan Peter Pan from August 18, where he teamed up with Isami Kodaka and competed in a gauntlet tag team match won by Soma Takao and Yukio Sakaguchi and also involving Keisuke Ishii and Shigehiro Irie, Hikaru Sato and Michael Nakazawa, and Poison Sawada Julie and Rion Mizuki. One year later at Ryōgoku Peter Pan 2013 on August 18, he teamed up with Daichi Kazato in a losing effort against Akito and Guanchulo. At Ryōgoku Peter Pan 2014 on August 17, Tsumaki competed in a Rumble rules match for the Ironman Heavymetalweight Championship won by Gorgeous Matsuno and also involving DJ Nira, Daisuke Sasaki, Tetsuya Endo, Ai Shimizu, Tomomitsu Matsunaga, Toru Owashi, Shiro Koshinaka and others.

Another branch of events in which he competed was the DDT Judgement, making his first appearance at the 2013 edition where he teamed up with Yasu Urano in a losing effort against Kota Ibushi and Kizaemon Saiga. At Judgement 2016: DDT 19th Anniversary on March 21, where he teamed up with his "World Heaviest Heavy Metal Tag/Iron Priest" tag team partner Yusuke Kubo and Sagat to defeat Takumi Tsukamoto, Daichi Kazato and Gouma Ryu.

=== Pro-Wrestling Basara (2016–present) ===
Tsumaki is mainly known for competing in Pro-Wrestling Basara, starting by the time when the company was still a satellite promotion under DDT's patronage. He is currently part of the "Iron Priest" stable. Tsumaki made his first appearance at DDT BASARA Raising An Army ~Stake Everything~ on January 21, 2016, where he teamed up with Daichi Kazato in a losing effort against Isami Kodaka and Takumi Tsukamoto as a result of a tag team match. He soon started to chase for various titles. He eventually won his first title in the company, the Iron Fist Tag Team Championship alongside Yusuke Kubo by defeating Sento Minzoku (Daiki Shimomura and Isami Kodaka) in the finals of a tournament to become the inaugural champions. At BASARA 90 Itto Ryodan, Tsumaki teamed up with Kubo and Sagat and defeated Abdullah Kobayashi, Hideki Suzuki and Yoshihisa Uto to win the Yokohama Shopping Street 6-Man Tag Team Championship, a title owned by Big Japan Pro Wrestling which was shortly contested in Basara. Tsumaki is a former two-time Union Max Champion, title which he first won at Shiwasu no Union 2014 on December 17 by defeating Hikaru Sato. At BASARA 207 ~ Takagari 14 on December 17, 2022, he competed in a battle royal won by Fuminori Abe and also involving Daiki Shimomura, Trans-Am Hiroshi, Masato Kamino, Takato Nakano and many others.

He also competed in a couple of the promotion's signature events such as the "Heaven Summit Itadaki", making his first appearance at the first-ever edition of the tournament from 2016, where he fought in the block B where he scored a total of five points after going against Hiroshi Fukuda, Takumi Tsukamoto, Daichi Kazato and Ryu Gouma.

== Championships and accomplishments ==
- Big Japan Pro Wrestling
  - Yokohama Shopping Street 6-Man Tag Team Championship (1 time) – with Yusuke Kubo and Sagat
- Pro-Wrestling Basara
  - Union Max Championship (3 times)
  - Iron Fist Tag Team Championship (2 times) – with Yusuke Kubo (1) and Ryuichi Sekine (1)
  - Iron Fist Tag Tournament (2019) – with Yusuke Kubo
- Okinawa Pro Wrestling
  - MWF World Tag Team Championship (1 time) – with Eisa8
- Union Pro-Wrestling
  - UWA World Tag Team Championship (1 time) – with Isami Kodaka
