= Sagit =

Sagit may refer to:

- Sagit (cycling team), Italian professional cycling team

== People with the given name Sagit ==
- Sagit Agish (1904-1973), Bashkir Russian poet
- Sagit Zluf Namir (born 1978), Israeli photographer

== See also ==
- Sagat (disambiguation)
- Saget, surname
- Sagot (disambiguation)
- Sagitta (disambiguation)
- Sagittarius (disambiguation)
