= Sagat =

Sagat may refer to:

== People ==
- Sagat (name), includes a list of people with the given name and surname
- Sagat (rapper), an American rapper from Baltimore, Maryland
- Sagat (wrestler) (born 1990), Japanese pro-wrestler

== Other uses ==
- Sagat (Street Fighter), a fictional character from Street Fighter series
- Sagat (musical instrument), or zill, finger cymbals
- Società Azionaria Gestione Aeroporto Torino (SAGAT), Turin Caselle airport operator, in Turin, Italy
- Ságat, a Sámi newspaper written in Norwegian published in Finnmark, Norway

== See also ==
- Sagit (disambiguation)
- Sagot (disambiguation)
