= Iron Fist Tag Team Championship =

Professional wrestling tag team championship

- The Iron Fist Tag Team Championship belts

Details
- Promotion: Pro-Wrestling Basara
- Date established: September 26, 2019
- Current champions: Aijin Tag (Masato Kamino and Takato Nakano)
- Date won: March 27, 2026
Statistics
- First champions: Iron Priest (Fuma and Yusuke Kubo)
- Most reigns: As individual: Daiki Shimomura (4 reigns); As a team: Aijin Tag (Masato Kamino and Takato Nakano) (3 reigns)
- Oldest champion: Yasu Urano (46 years, 295 days)
- Youngest champion: Daiki Shimomura (23 years, 11 days)

The Iron Fist Tag Team Championship (Japanese: IRON FIST TAG王者, Hepburn: Aian Fisto Taggu Ōza) is a professional wrestling tag team championship owned by the Pro-Wrestling Basara promotion, a former DDT Pro-Wrestling sub-brand before it became an independent promotion on January 1, 2020.

Like most professional wrestling championships, the title is won as a result of a scripted match. The current title holders are Aijin Tag (Masato Kamino and Takato Nakano) who are in their third reign as a team as well as individually.

== History ==
On October 4, 2019, DDT announced that the third edition of the Basara branded Iron Fist Tag Tournament would crown the first Iron Fist Tag Team Champions. The finals of the tournament took place on October 23, 2019, and saw Iron Priest (Fuma and Yusuke Kubo) defeat Sento Minzoku (Daiki Shimomura and Isami Kodaka) to become the inaugural champions.

Aijin Tag (Masato Kamino and Takato Nakano) were scheduled to defend the title against Trans-Am★Hiroshi and Antonio Honda at Basara 218 on May 13, 2023; however, Kamino was pulled from the event as he had suffered a knee injury on May 8. Hiroshi and Honda instead faced Sento Minzoku (Daiki Shimomura and Minoru Fujita) to determine interim champions. Sento Minzoku were victorious and served as interim champions until Basara 225 on July 23, where they defeated the lineal champions to determine the undisputed champions.

On October 20, 2023, Daiki Shimomura was suspended for a year due to inappropriate conduct. As a result, on the next day, the championship was vacated and the team of Shimomura and Minoru Fujita withdrawn from the Iron Fist Tag Tournament. Basara then announced that the winners of the tournament would become the new champions. Harimau (Ryota Nakatsu and Kazusada Higuchi) were eventually victorious, defeating Takumi Tsukamoto and Sagat in the finals.

== Reigns ==
As of October 28, 2026, there have been a total of 16 reigns shared among eleven different teams consisting of 17 distinctive wrestlers, plus an interim reign, and one vacancy. The current champions are Aijin Tag (Masato Kamino and Takato Nakano) who are in their third reign both as a team and individually. They won the title by defeating Daiki Shimomura and Takumi Tsukamoto on March 27, 2026.

Key
No.	Overall reign number
Reign	Reign number for the specific team—reign numbers for the individuals are in parentheses, if different
Days	Number of days held
Defenses	Number of successful defenses
+	Current reign is changing daily

No.	Champion	Championship change			Reign statistics			Notes	Ref.
No.	Champion	Date	Event	Location	Reign	Days	Defenses	Notes	Ref.
(DDT) DDT Pro-Wrestling: Pro-Wrestling Basara
1	Iron Priest (Fuma and Yusuke Kubo)	October 23, 2019	Basara 109	Tokyo, Japan	1	91	2	Defeated Sento Minzoku (Daiki Shimomura and Isami Kodaka) in the final of the 2019 Iron Fist Tag Tournament to become the inaugural champions.	
Pro-Wrestling Basara
2	Speed of Sounds (Banana Senga and Tsutomu Oosugi)	January 22, 2020	Basara 117	Tokyo, Japan	1	364	7		
3	Sento Minzoku (Isami Kodaka and Daiki Shimomura)	January 20, 2021	Basara 146	Tokyo, Japan	1	168	2		
4	Astronauts (Fuminori Abe and Takuya Nomura)	July 7, 2021	Basara 162	Tokyo, Japan	1	109	2		
5	Speed of Sounds (Banana Senga and Tsutomu Oosugi)	October 24, 2021	Basara 173	Tokyo, Japan	2	317	6		
6	Aijin Tag (Masato Kamino and Takato Nakano)	September 6, 2022	Basara 199	Tokyo, Japan	1	96	1		
7	Takumi Tsukamoto and Yasu Urano	December 11, 2022	Basara 206	Tokyo, Japan	1	51	0		
8	Sento Minzoku (Isami Kodaka and Daiki Shimomura)	January 31, 2023	Basara 209	Tokyo, Japan	2	18	0		
9	Aijin Tag (Masato Kamino and Takato Nakano)	February 18, 2023	Basara 211	Tokyo, Japan	2	155	2	Daiki Shimomura and Minoru Fujita became interim champions on May 13, 2023, however, Kamino and Nakano's reign was recognized as uninterrupted until July 23, 2023.	
—	Sento Minzoku (Daiki Shimomura and Minoru Fujita)	May 13, 2023	Basara 218	Tokyo, Japan	—	71	0	Defeated Trans-Am★Hiroshi and Antonio Honda to become the interim champions while Masato Kamino was out of action due to a knee injury.	
10	Sento Minzoku (Daiki Shimomura and Minoru Fujita)	July 23, 2023	Basara 225	Tokyo, Japan	1 (3, 1)	90	3	Defeated lineal champions Aijin Tag (Masato Kamino and Takato Nakano) to unify the title. This was also considered Shimomura and Fujita's first defense of the title in this reign.	
—	Vacated	October 21, 2023	—	—	—	—	—	Title vacated due to Daiki Shimomura's one-year suspension.	
11	Harimau (Ryota Nakatsu and Kazusada Higuchi)	November 7, 2023	Basara 235	Tokyo, Japan	1	227	4	Defeated Takumi Tsukamoto and Sagat in the final of the 2023 Iron Fist Tag Tournament to win the vacant title.	
12	Astronauts (Fuminori Abe and Takuya Nomura)	June 21, 2024	Basara 251	Tokyo, Japan	2	245	4		
13	Hyakushou Ikki (Fuma and Ryuichi Sekine)	February 21, 2025	Basara 271	Tokyo, Japan	1 (2, 1)	163	2		
14	MJ2 (Ayumu Honda and Kengo Mashimo)	August 3, 2025	Basara 285	Tokyo, Japan	1 (1, 1)	146	3		
15	Daiki Shimomura and Takumi Tsukamoto	December 27, 2025	Basara 295	Tokyo, Japan	1 (4, 2)	90	2		
16	Aijin Tag (Masato Kamino and Takato Nakano)	March 27, 2026	Basara 303	Tokyo, Japan	3	215+	6		

== Combined reigns ==
As of October 28, 2026.

†	Indicates the current champions

=== By team ===
Rank	Team	No. of reigns	Combined defenses	Combined days
1	Speed of Sounds (Banana Senga and Tsutomu Oosugi)	2	13	681
2	Aijin Tag † (Masato Kamino and Takato Nakano)	3	9	466+
3	Astronauts (Fuminori Abe and Takuya Nomura)	2	6	354
4	Harimau (Ryota Nakatsu and Kazusada Higuchi)	1	4	227
5	Sento Minzoku (Isami Kodaka and Daiki Shimomura)	2	2	186
6	Hyakushou Ikki (Fuma and Ryuichi Sekine)	1	2	163
7	MJ2 (Ayumu Honda and Kengo Mashimo)	1	3	146
8	Iron Priest (Fuma and Yusuke Kubo)	1	2	91
9	Sento Minzoku (Daiki Shimomura and Minoru Fujita)	1	3	90
9	Daiki Shimomura and Takumi Tsukamoto	1	2	90
11	Takumi Tsukamoto and Yasu Urano	1	0	51

=== By wrestler ===
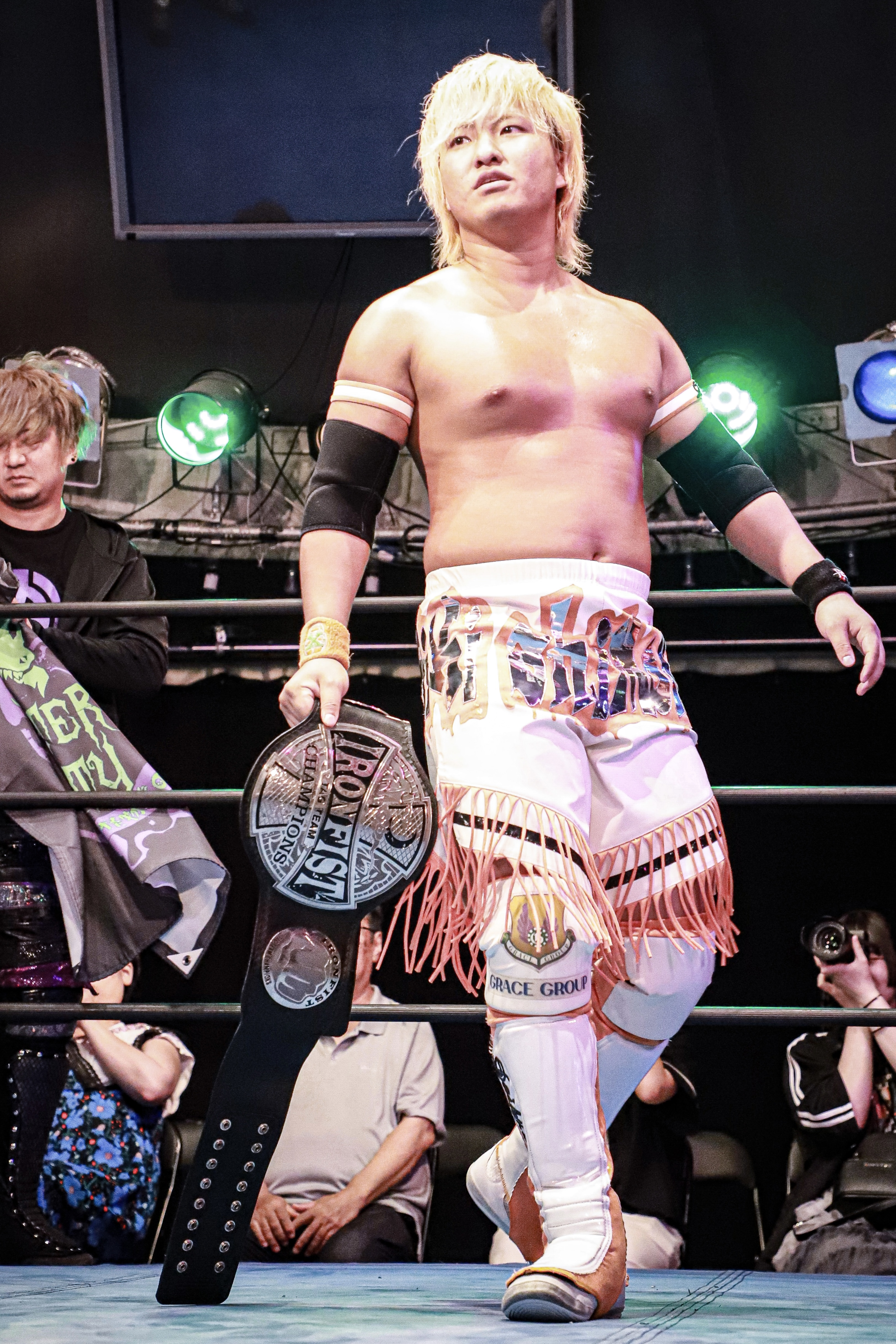
Record four-time champion as individual, Daiki Shimomura.

Rank	Wrestler	No. of reigns	Combined defenses	Combined days
1	Tsutomu Oosugi	2	13	681
1	Banana Senga	2	13	681
3	Masato Kamino †	3	9	466+
3	Takato Nakano †	3	9	466+
5	Daiki Shimomura	4	7	366
6	Fuminori Abe	2	6	354
6	Takuya Nomura	2	6	354
8	Fuma	2	4	254
9	Kazusada Higuchi	1	4	227
9	Ryota Nakatsu	1	4	227
11	Isami Kodaka	2	2	186
12	Ryuichi Sekine	1	2	163
13	Ayumu Honda	1	3	146
13	Kengo Mashimo	1	3	146
15	Takumi Tsukamoto	2	2	141
16	Yusuke Kubo	1	2	91
17	Minoru Fujita	1	3	90
18	Yasu Urano	1	0	51

== See also ==
- Professional wrestling in Japan
