= Saret =

Saret is a surname. Notable people with the surname include:

- Alan Saret (born 1944), American sculptor, draftsman, and installation artist
- Jennifer Saret (born 1974), Filipino tennis player

== See also ==
- Saget
