= Sagot =

Sagot may refer to:

== Places ==
- 20242 Sagot, a minor planet in the Solar System

== People with the surname Sagot ==
- Clovis Sagot (1854–1913) French art dealer
- Émile Sagot (1805–1888), French illustrator
- Julien Sagot (a.k.a. "Sagot"), Canadian musician
- Marie-France Sagot, French computer scientist
- Montserrat Sagot, Costa Rican sociologist
- Robert Sagot, namesake of minor planet 20242 Sagot

== See also ==
- Sagat (disambiguation)
- Saget, surname
- Sagit (disambiguation)
