= Sagittarius =

Sagittarius (/ˌsædʒɪˈtɛəriəs, ˌsæɡɪ-/ SAJ-ih-TAIR-ee-əs, SAG-ih-) may refer to:

- Sagittarius (constellation)
- Sagittarius (astrology), a sign of the Zodiac
- Sagittarius of Gap, a 6th century bishop
- Sagittarius A*, the supermassive black hole at the center of the Milky Way galaxy

== Ships ==
- SuperStar Sagittarius, a cruise ship
- USS Sagittarius (AKN-2), a World War II US Navy cargo ship

== Music ==
- Sagittarius (band), an American sunshine pop studio group
- Ensemble Sagittarius, an ensemble conducted by Michel Laplénie

== Fictional characters ==
- Sagittarius (comics), member of Zodiac, an evil group in the Marvel Universe
- Sagittarius Aiolos, a character in Saint Seiya
- Sagittarius, a Fairy Tail character

== Zoology ==
- Sagittarius serpentarius or secretarybird, a large, mostly terrestrial bird of prey
- Sibynophis sagittarius, a species of snake found in South Asia

== Other uses ==
- Sagittarii, Ancient Roman archers
- Sagittario or Sagittarius, a Beyblade toy

== See also ==
- Sagittarius Dwarf Galaxy (disambiguation)
- Sagitta (disambiguation)
- Sagittaria, a genus of about 20 species of aquatic plants
- Sagittarians (disambiguation)
- Sagittiferidae, a family of acoelomorph worms
- Category:Sagittarius (constellation), objects visually within the constellation, e.g. stars named ~ Sagitarii
