= Sagitta (disambiguation) =

Sagitta is a constellation, named after the Latin word for arrow.

Sagitta may also refer to:

- Sagitta (arrowworm), a genus of chaetognaths in the class Sagittoidea
- Sagitta (geometry), the depth of an arc
- Sagitta (optics), a measure of the glass removed to yield an optical curve
- Ligularia sagitta, a plant species
- Sagitta, one of the otoliths, a structure in the inner ear of some fish
- N.V. Vliegtuigbouw 013 Sagitta, a Dutch-designed glider that first flew in 1960
- USNS Sagitta (T-AK-87) (1944–1959)
- Versine, a trigonometric function
- Sagitta, pseudonym of Scottish-German author John Henry Mackay (1864–1933)

== See also ==
- Sagittal, in mathematics
- Sagittaria. a genus of aquatic plants
- Sagittarius (disambiguation)
- Sagit (disambiguation)
