= Sagittarians =

Sagittarians may refer to:

- Sagittarian, a person born under the astrological sign Sagittarius
- Sagittarians, a fictional Marvel Comics alien race

== See also ==
- Sagittaria, a genus of aquatic plants
- Sagittarius (disambiguation)
