= Into The Fight 2018 =

2018 DDT Pro-Wrestling event

- Promotional poster for the event, featuring various DDT wrestlers
- Promotion: DDT Pro-Wrestling
- Date: February 25, 2018
- City: Tokyo, Japan
- Venue: Korakuen Hall
- Attendance: 1,220

Event chronology
← Previous; Never Mind 2017	Next → Judgment 2018

Into The Fight chronology
← Previous; 2017	Next → 2019

Into The Fight 2018 was a professional wrestling event promoted by DDT Pro-Wrestling (DDT). It took place on February 25, 2018, in Tokyo, Japan, at the Korakuen Hall. The event aired domestically on Fighting TV Samurai and AbemaTV, and globally on DDT Universe, DDT's video-on-demand service.

== Storylines ==
Into The Fight 2018 featured eight professional wrestling matches involving wrestlers from pre-existing scripted feuds and storylines. Wrestlers portrayed villains, heroes, or less distinguishable characters in the scripted events that built tension and culminated in a wrestling match or series of matches.

== Event ==
During the event, Shuten-dōji (Kudo, Yukio Sakaguchi and Masahiro Takanashi) retained the KO-D 6-Man Tag Team Championship by defeating the team of Ryuichi Sekine, Ryota Nakatsu and Fuminori Abe from Pro-Wrestling Basara, a sub-brand of DDT.

In the next match, Yuko Miyamoto defended the DDT Extreme Division Championship against Shunma Katsumata in a hardcore match dubbed "Hardcore + α". In this match, various weapons were placed around the ring and each competitor could choose an extra weapon to bring. Miyamoto chose a baseball bat coated in barbed wire, while Katsumata chose a box of thumbtacks.

The next match saw the participation of Naomichi Marufuji from Pro Wrestling Noah.

== Results ==
No.	Results	Stipulations	Times
1^{P}	Mad Paulie defeated Tomomitsu Matsunaga	Singles match	06:32
2	Soma Takao and Mao won by last eliminating Sanshiro Takagi and Super Sasadango Machine	Tag team rumble rules match	06:14
3	Danshoku Dino defeated Akito, Antonio Honda, Kouki Iwasaki, Mizuki Watase and Saki Akai	Six-way match	06:58
4	Damnation (Daisuke Sasaki and Tetsuya Endo) defeated Keisuke Ishii and Ken Ohka	Tag team match	08:01
5	Shuten-dōji (Kudo, Yukio Sakaguchi and Masahiro Takanashi) (c) defeated Ryuichi Sekine, Ryota Nakatsu and Fuminori Abe by submission	Six-man tag team match for the KO-D 6-Man Tag Team Championship	08:50
6	Yuko Miyamoto (c) defeated Shunma Katsumata	Hardcore + α match for the DDT Extreme Division Championship	11:45
7	Naomichi Marufuji defeated Kazusada Higuchi	Singles match	13:02
8	Shuji Ishikawa and Daisuke Sekimoto defeated Konosuke Takeshita and Harashima	Tag team match	18:34
(c) / – the champion(s) heading into the match; P / – the match was broadcast on the pre-show

=== Tag team rumble rules match ===
Order	Team	Order eliminated	By	Time
1	Yuki Ueno and Koju Takeda	1	Makoto Oishi	02:06
2	Makoto Oishi and Kota Umeda	3	Super Sasadango Machine	05:32
3	Soma Takao and Mao	—	—	Winners
4	T2Hii (Toru Owashi and Kazuki Hirata)	2	Super Sasadango Machine	05:00
5	Sanshiro Takagi and Super Sasadango Machine	4	Mao	06:14
