= Sagat (wrestler) =

Japanese wrestler (born 1990)

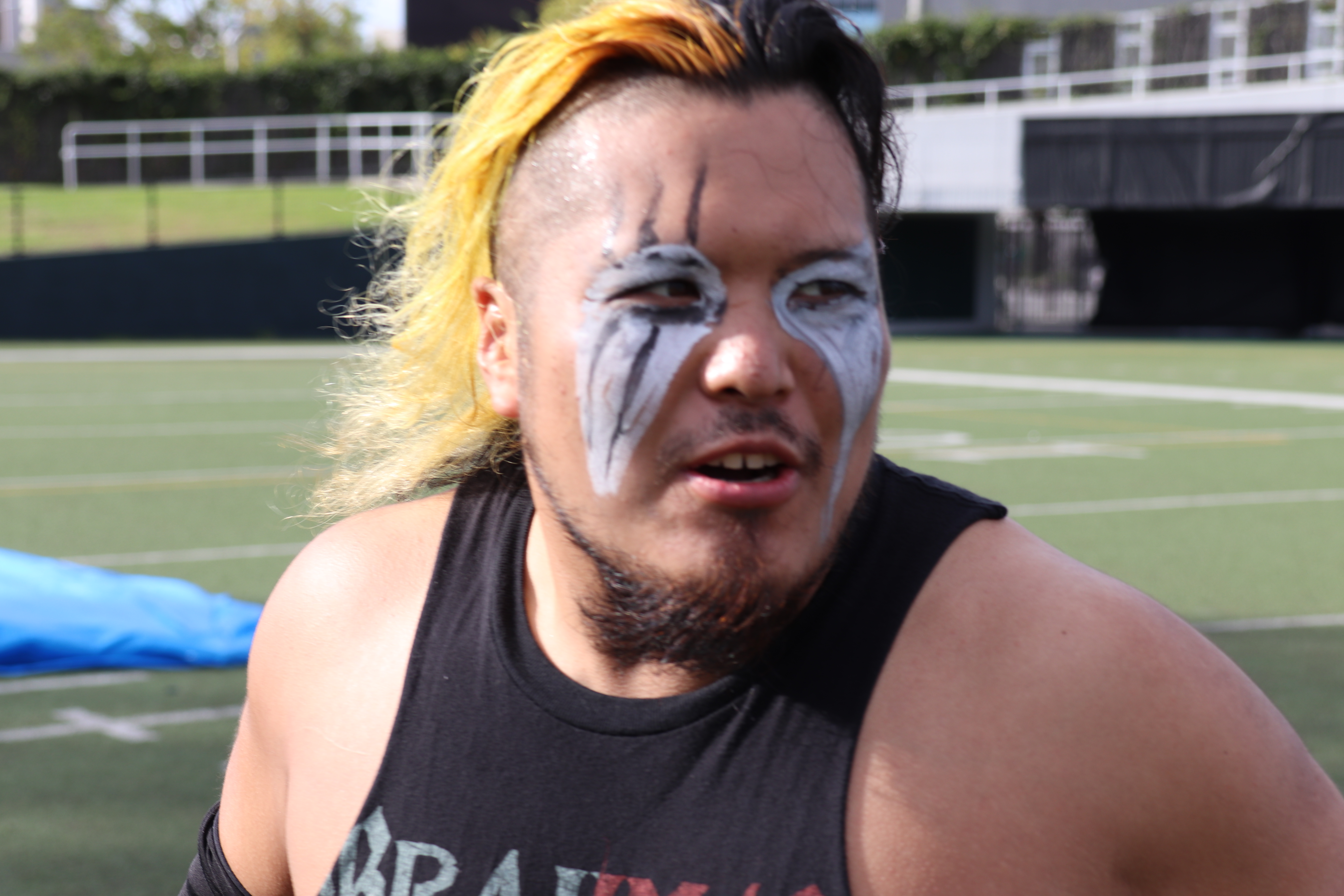
- Sagat in 2021

Personal information
- Born: July 26, 1990 (age 36) Saitama, Japan

Professional wrestling career
- Ring names: Trans-Am*Hiroshi #6; Man Man Kai Kind; Sagat
- Billed height: 170 cm (5 ft 7 in)
- Billed weight: 100 kg (220 lb)
- Debut: 2010

Hiroshi Sagawa (佐川博志, Sagawa Hiroshi) better known mononymously by his ring name Sagat (often stylized in capital letters as SAGAT) is a Japanese professional wrestler currently working as a freelancer and is best known for his tenure with the Japanese promotions DDT Pro-Wrestling and Big Japan Pro Wrestling.

== Professional wrestling career ==
=== Independent circuit (2010–present) ===
As a freelancer, Sagat is known to have competed in various promotions. At OZ Academy Mio Shirai Produce Tonight Is The Night, an event promoted by Oz Academy on March 2, 2014, he teamed up with Seiya Morohashi in a losing effort to Aja Kong and Tsubasa Kuragaki. On September 20, 2015, Sagat participated at the Mio Shirai's Retirement Show promoted by Pro Wrestling Wave, Ice Ribbon and Oz Academy where he competed in a 22-person battle royal won by Sonoko Kato and also involving Cherry, Rina Yamashita, Ryo Mizunami and others. At Gatoh Move Japan Tour #198, an event promoted by Gatoh Move Pro Wrestling on November 28, 2015, Sagat teamed up with Sayaka Obihiro in a losing effort to Hikaru Shida and Madoka as a result of an intergender tag team match. At Ice Ribbon Tax Pro Wrestling Vol. 4 ~ Be Happy With Pro Wrestling from March 10, 2019, Sagat teamed up with Trans Am Hiroshi to defeat Daiki Shimomura and Ryuichi Sekine in a tag team match.

==== Big Japan Pro Wrestling (2014–2017) ====
Sagat was also a part of Big Japan Pro Wrestling's roster. At BJW Ryogokutan on July 20, 2015 he teamed up with Masaya Takahashi and Ryuichi Sekine, losing against B Faultless Junky's (Jaki Numazawa, Masashi Takeda and Takumi Tsukamoto) in a six-man Ryogoku Death Matsuri Deathmatch. At BJW BJW-Style #3 ~ Burning Death Game on August 2, 2015, he teamed up with Yuko Miyamoto, falling short to Masashi Takeda and Masaya Takahashi in a Barbed wire board deathmatch. He made his final appearance in the promotion at BJW BJ Style 11 on February 26, 2017 where he teamed up with Takumi Tsukamoto in a losing effort to Kazuki Hashimoto and Takuya Nomura.

==== DDT Pro Wrestling (2012–present) ====
Sagat made his professional wrestling debut in the Union Pro branch of DDT Pro Wrestling at the Union Pro 7th Anniversary Show on November 23, 2012, where he defeated El Hijo del Goro.

He is known for competing in various of the promotion's events such as DDT Ultimate Party. At Ultimate Party 2019 he wrestled into a Rumble rules match for the Ironman Heavymetalweight Championship won by Kazuki Hirata and also involving Gorgeous Matsuno, Mina Shirakawa, Toru Owashi and others.

As for the DDT Judgement branch of events, Sagat made his first appearance at Judgement 2016: DDT 19th Anniversary on March 21 where he teamed up with World Heaviest Heavy Metal Tag (Fuma and Yusuke Kubo) to defeat Takumi Tsukamoto, Daichi Kazato and Gouma Ryu in a Six-man tag team match.

Another branch of events in which he competed in the DDT Peter Pan. At Ryōgoku Peter Pan 2014 on August 17 he teamed up with Daichi Kazato, Masayuki Mitomi and Tomoya Kawamura in a losing effort to Hoshitango, Rion Mizuki, Gota Ihashi and Shunma Katsumata.

== Championships and accomplishments ==
- Big Japan Pro Wrestling
  - BJW Tag Team Championship (1 time) – with Masaya Takahashi
  - Yokohama Shopping Street 6-Man Tag Team Championship (1 time) – with Fuma and Yusuke Kubo
- DDT Pro Wrestling
  - Ironman Heavymetalweight Championship (1 time)
- Pro-Wrestling Basara
  - CCW Canadian Heavyweight Championship (1 time)
  - Itadaki (2023)
