= Ryota Nakatsu =

Japanese professional wrestler

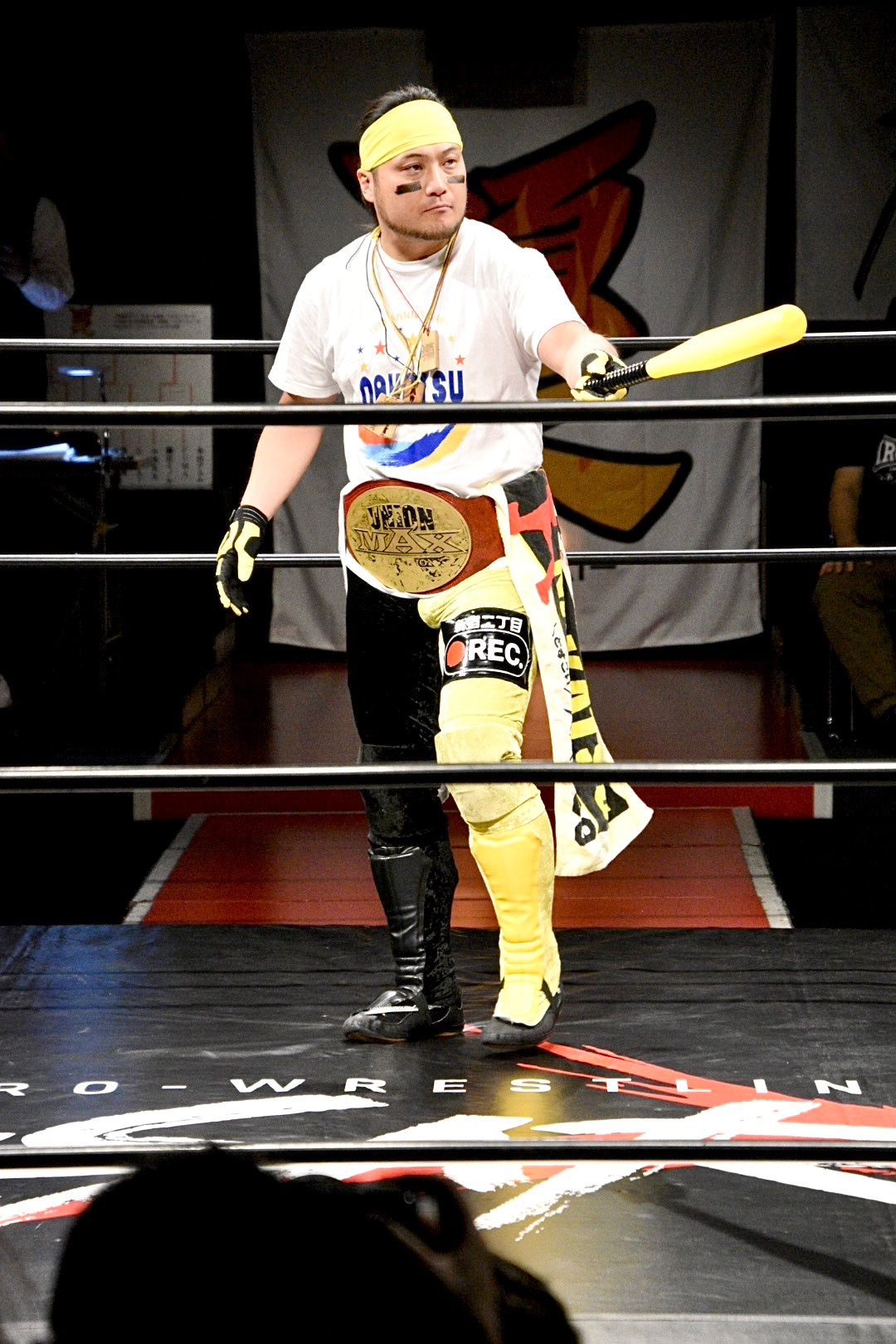
- Nakatsu in 2025

Personal information
- Born: January 23, 1991 (age 35) Kyoto, Japan

Professional wrestling career
- Ring name(s): Trans-Am*Hiroshi #5; Nakatsu Dickinson; Carlos Nakatsu; Ryota Nakatsu
- Billed height: 170 cm (5 ft 7 in)
- Billed weight: 85 kg (187 lb)
- Debut: 2014

Ryota Nakatsu (中津良太, Nakatsu Ryōta) is a Japanese professional wrestler currently working as a freelancer and is best known for his tenure with the Japanese promotions DDT Pro Wrestling and Pro-Wrestling Basara.

== Professional wrestling career ==
=== Independent circuit (2014–present) ===
As a freelancer, Nakatsu is known for his relationship with various other promotions. At Suwamachi Revitalization Vol. 9, an event promoted by All Japan Pro Wrestling on October 30, 2016, he teamed up with Koji Iwamoto and Ryuichi Sekine as Cavalry in a losing effort to Isami Kodaka, Kazuhiro Tamura and Takao Omori. At ZERO1 Kohei Sato 15th Anniversary Show, an event promoted by Pro Wrestling Zero1 on November 6, 2016, Nakatsu teamed up with Takumi Tsukamoto and Isami Kodaka in a losing effort against Ikuto Hidaka, Kotaro Suzuki and Takuya Sugawara.

At NOAH Great Voyage 2018 In Yokohama, an event promoted by Pro Wrestling Noah on March 11, 2018, he teamed up with Masao Inoue in a losing effort to Cody Hall and Kazma Sakamoto. At 2AW GRAND SLAM In Shinkiba, an event promoted by Active Advance Pro Wrestling on January 10, 2020, he unsuccessfully challenged Shu Asakawa for the 2AW Openweight Championship.

=== DDT Pro-Wrestling (2014–2020) ===
Nakatsu made his professional wrestling debut at DDT Dramatic Fanclub Vol. 1, an event promoted by DDT Pro-Wrestling on October 18, 2014 where he went into a time-limit draw against Kouki Iwasaki.

Nakatsu competed in various signature events of the promotion. One of them is DDT Peter Pan. At Ryōgoku Peter Pan 2015 on August 23, he teamed up with Yasu Urano and Akito to defeat Kota Umeda, Mao Inoue and Mizuki Watase by submission in a six-man tag team match. He marked his last appearance four years later at Wrestle Peter Pan 2019 on July 15 where he teamed up with Kazusada Higuchi to defeat Kota Umeda and Kouki Iwasaki in a tag team match.

As for the DDT Judgement branch of events, he made his first appearance at Judgement 2016: DDT 19th Anniversary on March 21 where he competed in a #1 Contendership & Right To Challenge Anytime, Anywhere Contract Battle Royal for the KO-D Openweight Championship also involving the winner Kazusada Higuchi, Tomomitsu Matsunaga, Cherry, Gorgeous Matsuno, Ken Ohka, Soma Takao and others.

He also worked in the DDT Ultimate Party events, making an appearance at Ultimate Party 2019 where he teamed up with Yukio Sakaguchi and competed in a Gauntlet tag team match also involving Nautilus (Yuki Ueno and Naomi Yoshimura), Yukio Naya and Cody Hall, Shuichiro Katsumura and Kouki Iwasaki, NEO Itoh Respect Army (Maki Itoh and Chris Brookes) and Bakuretsu Sisters (Nodoka Tenma and Yuki Aino).

As for the DDT Into The Fight branch, he competed for the last time at Into The Fight 2018 on where he teamed up with Ryuichi Sekine and Fuminori Abe in a losing effort to Shuten-dōji (Kudo, Yukio Sakaguchi and Masahiro Takanashi) for the KO-D 6-Man Tag Team Championship.

=== Pro-Wrestling Basara (2016–present) ===
Nakatsu works also for Pro-Wrestling Basara where he is a former NWA International Lightweight Tag Team Champion alongside Ryuichi Sekine. title which they won at DDT BASARA 27 ~ Osaka Winter In Oyodo ~ from January 8, 2017, an event produced when Basara was still part of DDT Pro Wrestling where they defeated Isami Kodaka and Takumi Tsukamoto.

== Championships and accomplishments ==
- Big Japan Pro Wrestling
  - UWA World Trios Championship (1 time) – with Akiyori Takizawa and Naoki Tanizaki
- Niigata Pro Wrestling
  - Niigata Junior Heavyweight Championship (1 time, current)
- DDT Pro Wrestling
  - KO-D 6-Man Tag Team Championship (1 time) – with Kazusada Higuchi and Yuki Ishida
- Dove Pro-Wrestling
  - Dove Pro Heavyweight Championship (1 time, current)
  - Dove Pro Tag Team Championship (1 time, current) – with Naoki Tanizaki
  - Chōten (2020)
- Ganbare☆Pro-Wrestling
  - Spirit of Ganbare World Tag Team Championship (1 time) – with Takumi Tsukamoto
- Pro-Wrestling Basara
  - Union Max Championship (3 times)
  - Iron Fist Tag Team Championship (1 time) – with Kazusada Higuchi
  - Itadaki (2018, 2020, 2025)
  - Iron Fist Tag Tournament – with Ryuichi Sekine (2018), and Kazusada Higuchi (2023)
- Pro Wrestling Zero1
  - NWA International Lightweight Tag Team Championship (1 time) – with Ryuichi Sekine
