= Sagittarius Dwarf Galaxy =

Sagittarius Dwarf Galaxy may refer to:

- The Sagittarius Dwarf Spheroidal Galaxy (also known as the Sagittarius Dwarf Elliptical Galaxy), a satellite galaxy of the Milky Way
- The Sagittarius Dwarf Irregular Galaxy, a small member of the Local Group
