= Takumi Tsukamoto =

Japanese professional wrestler

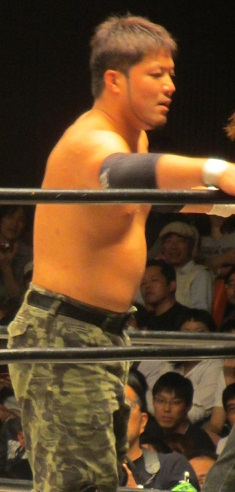
- Tsukamoto in September 2015

Personal information
- Born: January 6, 1991 (age 35) Nagasaki, Japan

Professional wrestling career
- Ring name(s): Angus Tsukamoto; Takumi Tsukamoto
- Billed height: 1.73 m (5 ft 8 in)
- Billed weight: 91 kg (201 lb)
- Trained by: Daisuke Sekimoto
- Debut: 2009

Takumi Tsukamoto (塚本拓海, Tsukamoto Takumi) is a Japanese professional wrestler currently working for Japanese professional wrestling promotion Big Japan Pro Wrestling (BJW).

== Professional wrestling career ==
=== Independent circuit (2009–present) ===
At BJW World Triangle Night In Korakuen, a cross-over event held between Big Japan Pro Wrestling (BJW), Westside Xtreme Wrestling (wXw) and Combat Zone Wrestling (CZW) on July 30, 2012, Tsukamoto teamed up with Kazuki Hashimoto and Men's Teioh to defeat Trent Seven, Atsushi Ohashi and MK McKinnan. Tsukamoto took place in the CZW Tournament of Death 12, an event promoted by Combat Zone Wrestling on June 18, 2013, where he competed into a pain of glass first-round match in which he defeated D. J. Hyde, and into a fluorescent lighttube semi-final match where he fell short to Danny Havoc. Tsukamoto participated at the Tokyo Gurentai Tokyo Carnival 2018 on September 26, 2018, where he teamed up with Yuko Miyamoto, replacing an injured Isami Kodaka in a Tokyo Intercontinental Tag Team Championship defense against Masaaki Mochizuki and Rocky Kawamura against whom they fell short. He also worked for All Japan Pro Wrestling, participating at AJPW Super Power Series 2016 from May 21, where he teamed up with Masashi Takeda as B Faultless Junky's and Atsushi Maruyama to defeat Masanobu Fuchi, Sushi and Yohei Nakajima in a six-man tag team match. At BASARA 132 ~ Koo ~ on September 8, 2020, Tsukamoto teamed up with Yasu Urano to unsuccessfully challenge Speed Of Sounds (Banana Senga and Tsutomu Oosugi) for the Iron Fist Tag Team Championship. At DDT Ultimate Party 2019 from November 3, Tsukamoto teamed up with Yasu Urano and Takato Nakano to successfully defend their UWA World Trios Championship in a three-way tag team match against Damnation (Tetsuya Endo, Mad Paulie and Nobuhiro Shimatani) and Ken Ohka, Yumehito Imanari and Miss Mongol.

=== Big Japan Pro Wrestling (2009–present) ===
Tsukamoto made his official debut as a professional wrestler at BJW/OZ Academy Asahikawa Pro-Wrestling Festival, a cross-over event promoted by Big Japan Pro Wrestling (BJW) and joshi promotion Oz Academy on September 22, 2009, where he fell short to Kazuki Hashimoto. He participated in one of the longest matches in professional wrestling history, a 108-man battle royal at Tenka Sanbun no Kei: New Year's Eve Special, a cross-over event held between Big Japan Pro Wrestling, Dramatic Dream Team (DDT) and Kaientai Dojo (K-Dojo) from December 31, 2009, competing against other infamous wrestlers such as Kota Ibushi, Taka Michinoku, Kenny Omega, Kankuro Hoshino, and the winner of the match, Jun Kasai. At a BJW's house show from January 25, 2018, Tsukamoto teamed up with Masashi Takeda as Crazy Lovers to defeat Abdullah Kobayashi and Ryuji Ito in a fluorescent lighttubes death match to win the BJW Tag Team Championship. At BJW 2021 New Year on January 2, Tsukamoto defeated Minoru Fujita in a barbed wire death match to win the BJW Deathmatch Heavyweight Championship.

== Championships and accomplishments ==
- Big Japan Pro Wrestling

- BJW Deathmatch Heavyweight Championship (1 time)
- BJW Tag Team Championship (2 times) – with Masashi Takeda
- Yokohama Shopping Street 6-Man Tag Team Championship (1 time) – with Kazuki Hashimoto and Yuji Okabayashi
- Dainichi-X (2012) – with Ryuji Ito
- Soushi Sousatsu Deathmatch Tag Tournament (2023)– with Masashi Takeda

- Ganbare☆Pro-Wrestling

- Spirit of Ganbare World Tag Team Championship (1 time) – with Ryota Nakatsu

- Japan Indie Awards

- Newcomer Award (2012)

- Pro-Wrestling Basara

- Union Max Championship (3 times, current)
- CCW Canadian Heavyweight Championship (2 times)
- UWA World Trios Championship (1 time) – with Yasu Urano and Takato Nakano
- Iron Fist Tag Team Championship (2 times) — with Yasu Urano (1) and Daiki Shimomura (1)
- Iron Fist Tag Tournament (2016) – with Isami Kodaka

- Total Triumph Team

- TTT Indie Unified Tag Team Championship (1 time)– with Syuou Fujiwara
- TTT Indie Unified Six-Man Tag Team Championship (1 time, current) – with Banana Senga and Kuro-Obi

- Pro Wrestling Illustrated
  - Ranked No. 375 of the top 500 singles wrestlers in the PWI 500 in 2023
- Pro Wrestling Zero1
  - NWA International Lightweight Tag Team Championship (2 times) – with Isami Kodaka
