= Pro-Wrestling Basara =

Japanese professional wrestling

- Founded: 2015 (brand); 2019 (company)
- Style: Puroresu; Comedy wrestling
- Headquarters: Room 101 Yotsuya Bit House, 1-3-35 Wakaba, Shinjuku, Tokyo, Japan
- Founder: Isami Kodaka
- Owner: Isami Kodaka
- Split from: DDT Pro-Wrestling
- Predecessor: Union Pro Wrestling
- Website: www.basarapw.com

Pro-Wrestling Basara (Japanese: プロレスリングBASARA, Hepburn: Puroresuringu Basara) is a Japanese professional wrestling promotion based in Shinjuku, Tokyo, Japan. The promotion was founded in 2015 as a sub-brand of DDT Pro-Wrestling and was essentially a relaunch of Union Pro Wrestling, acquired by DDT in 2005. On January 1, 2020, Basara became an independent promotion.

== History ==
=== Basara in DDT (2015–2019) ===
Having been active between 1993 and 1995, Union Pro Wrestling (UPW) was revived by DDT Pro-Wrestling (DDT) in 2005, with shows headlined by Poison Sawada, Shuji Ishikawa and Isami Kodaka. On October 4, 2015, UPW held its last show, celebrating its 10th anniversary. On October 7, Kodaka announced the formation of a new promotion that would replace UPW, named Pro-Wrestling Basara. The name "Basara" reads either as "eccentricity" (婆娑羅) or "Vajra" (伐折羅) and, according to Kodaka, relates back to the kabukimono which were gangs of samurai who dressed in flamboyant clothing and donned uncommon hairstyles. Basara was founded to "do something rebellious against the new, flashy style of wrestling". The Union Max Championship, formerly the top prize in Union Pro, was kept to be contested as the only singles championship in Basara.

=== Independence (2020–present) ===
On June 11, 2019, it was announced Basara would be splitting up from DDT and become an independent company starting January 1, 2020. On August 7, 2019, Pro-Wrestling Basara LLC (合同会社プロレスリングBASARA, Gōdō gaisha Puroresuringu Basara) was officially registered. In October, the third edition of the annual Iron Fist Tag Tournament led to the creation of Basara's first tag team championship, the Iron Fist Tag Team Championship. Since its independence, Basara has had partnerships with other Japanese promotions such as Dove Pro Wrestling or Wrestling of Darkness 666, and has used the UWA World Trios Championship as its trios title along with Big Japan Pro Wrestling.

On June 9, 2025, Kodaka stepped down from his position as president of the company due to the promotion's struggles in attracting audiences. Ryota Nakatsu subsequently became president, while Kodaka remained the company's representative. Alongside Nakatsu's appointment, Takumi Tsukamoto was named Head of Sales, and Takato Nakano was appointed Wrestlers' Representative.

== Roster ==
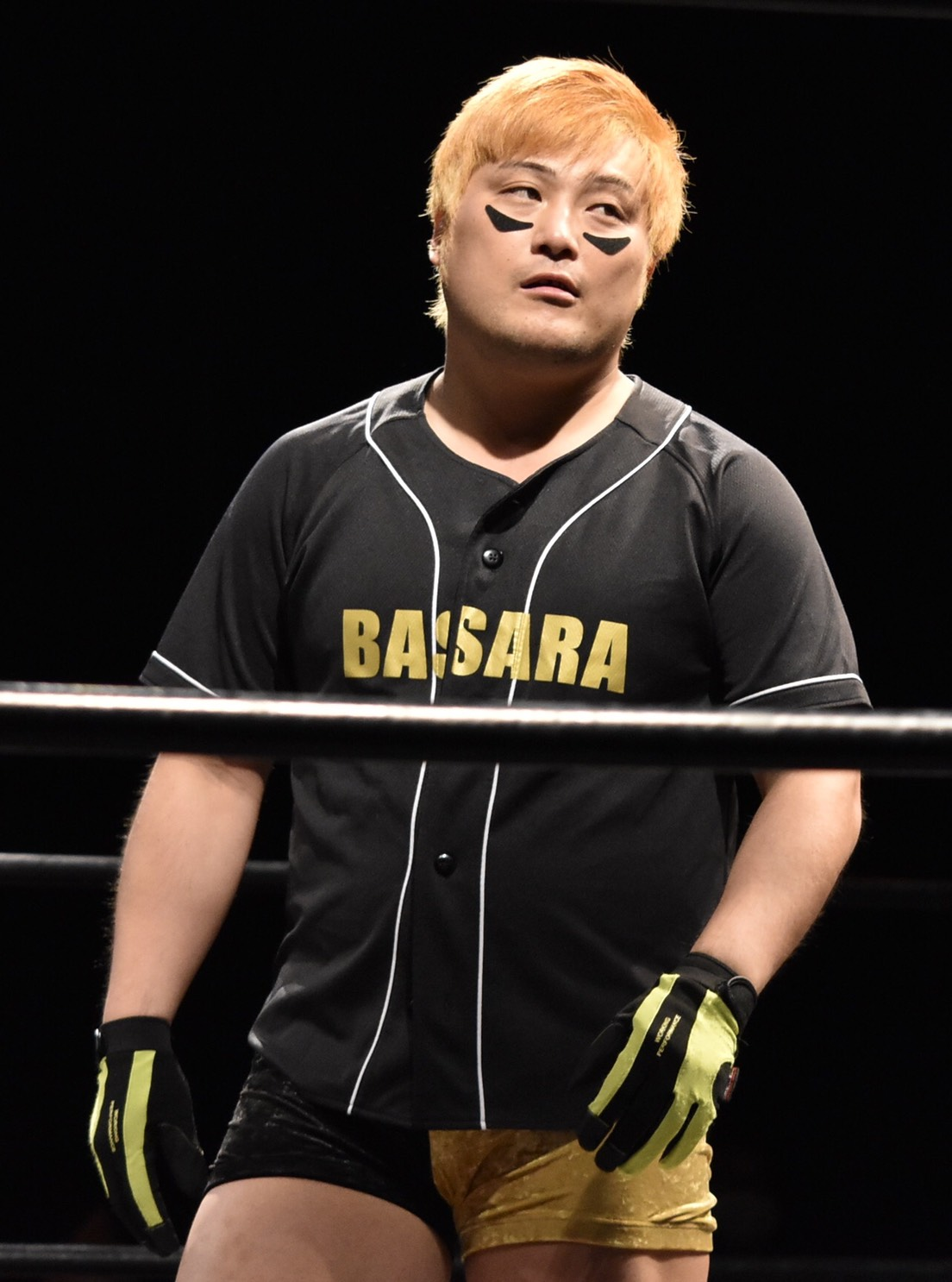
Ryota Nakatsu

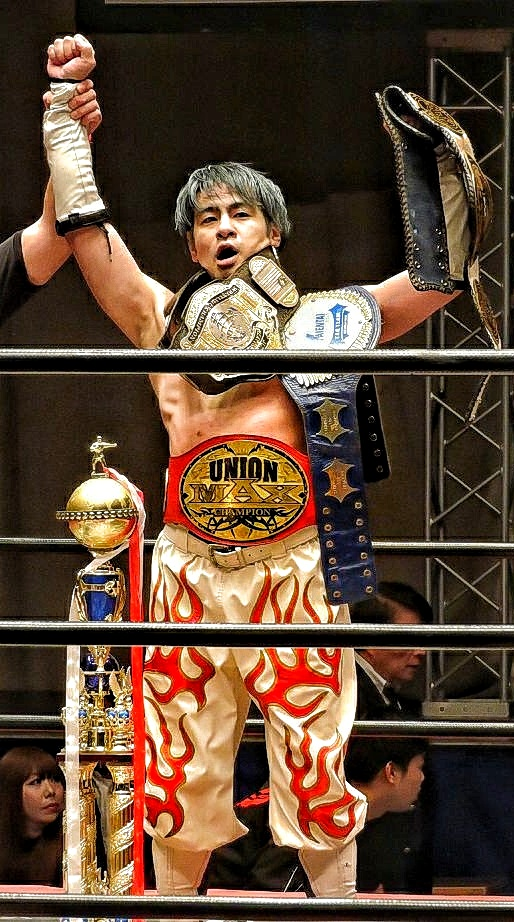
Isami Kodaka

There are two central units in Basara:

- Main Unit (Note: Japanese: 正規軍, Hepburn: Seiki-gun)
- Asian Kung Fu Revolution (Note: Japanese: アジアン・カンフー・レボリューション, Hepburn: Ajian Kanfū Reboryūshon)

Ring name	Real name	Unit	Notes
Banana Senga	Tatsuhito Senga	N/A	Freelancer
Daichi Kazato	Daichi Kazato	Asian Kung Fu Revolution	
Daiki Shimomura	Unknown	Main Unit	
Fuma	Hiroo Tsumaki	Asian Kung Fu Revolution	
Gouma Ryu	Ken'ichirō Kawabe	Main Unit	
Isami Kodaka	Unknown	Main Unit	
Lil Kraken	Tetsuo Usui	Main Unit	
Masato Kamino	Unknown	Main Unit	Iron Fist Tag Team Champion
Minoru Fujita	Minoru Fujita	N/A	Freelancer
Ryota Nakatsu	Unknown	Main Unit	
Ryuichi Sekine	Undisclosed	Main Unit	
Sagat	Hiroshi Sagawa	Main Unit	
Takato Nakano	Unknown	Main Unit	Iron Fist Tag Team Champion
Takeru Inoue	Unknown	Main Unit	
Takumi Tsukamoto	Takumi Tsukamoto	Main Unit	Union Max Champion
Trans-Am★Hiroshi	Hiroshi Fukuda	Asian Kung Fu Revolution	
Tsutomu Oosugi	Tsutomu Oosugi	N/A	Freelancer
Yasu Urano	Unknown	N/A	Freelancer

=== Alumni/guests ===
- Kaji Tomato
- Kohei Kinoshita
- Leo Isaka
- Ryuichi Kawakami
- Tank Nagai

== Championships ==
Championship	Current champion(s)	Reign	Date won	Days held	Location	Notes	Ref.
Union Max Championship	Takumi Tsukamoto	3	August 2, 2026	72+	Tokyo, Japan	Defeated Shuji Ishikawa at Basara 313.	
Iron Fist Tag Team Championship	Aijin Tag (Masato Kamino and Takato Nakano)	3	March 27, 2026	200+	Tokyo, Japan	Defeated Daiki Shimomura and Takumi Tsukamoto at Basara 303.	

== Tournaments ==
Accomplishment	Last winner(s)	Date won	Location	Notes
Itadaki	Ryota Nakatsu	May 23, 2025	Tokyo, Japan	Defeated Keisuke Ishii in the tournament final.
Iron Fist Tag Tournament	Daiki Shimomura and Shuichiro Katsumura	October 12, 2026	Tokyo, Japan	Defeated Takato Nakano and Masato Kamino in the tournament final.

== Broadcaster ==
- Niconico (2020–2025)
- Wrestle Universe (2025–present)

== See also ==
- Professional wrestling in Japan
- List of professional wrestling promotions in Japan
