= Sagat (name) =

Sagat is a given name and surname. Notable people with the name include:

== Given name ==
- Sagat Abikeyeva (born 1981), Kazakhstani judoka
- Sagat Petchyindee, Thai kickboxer
- Sagat Singh (1918–2001), Indian general

== Surname ==
- François Sagat (born 1979), French male pornographic actor and model
- Martin Šagát, Slovak ice hockey player
- Serhat Sağat (born 1983), Turkish footballer

== See also ==
- Saget, surname
