= Ryuichi Sekine =

Japanese professional wrestler

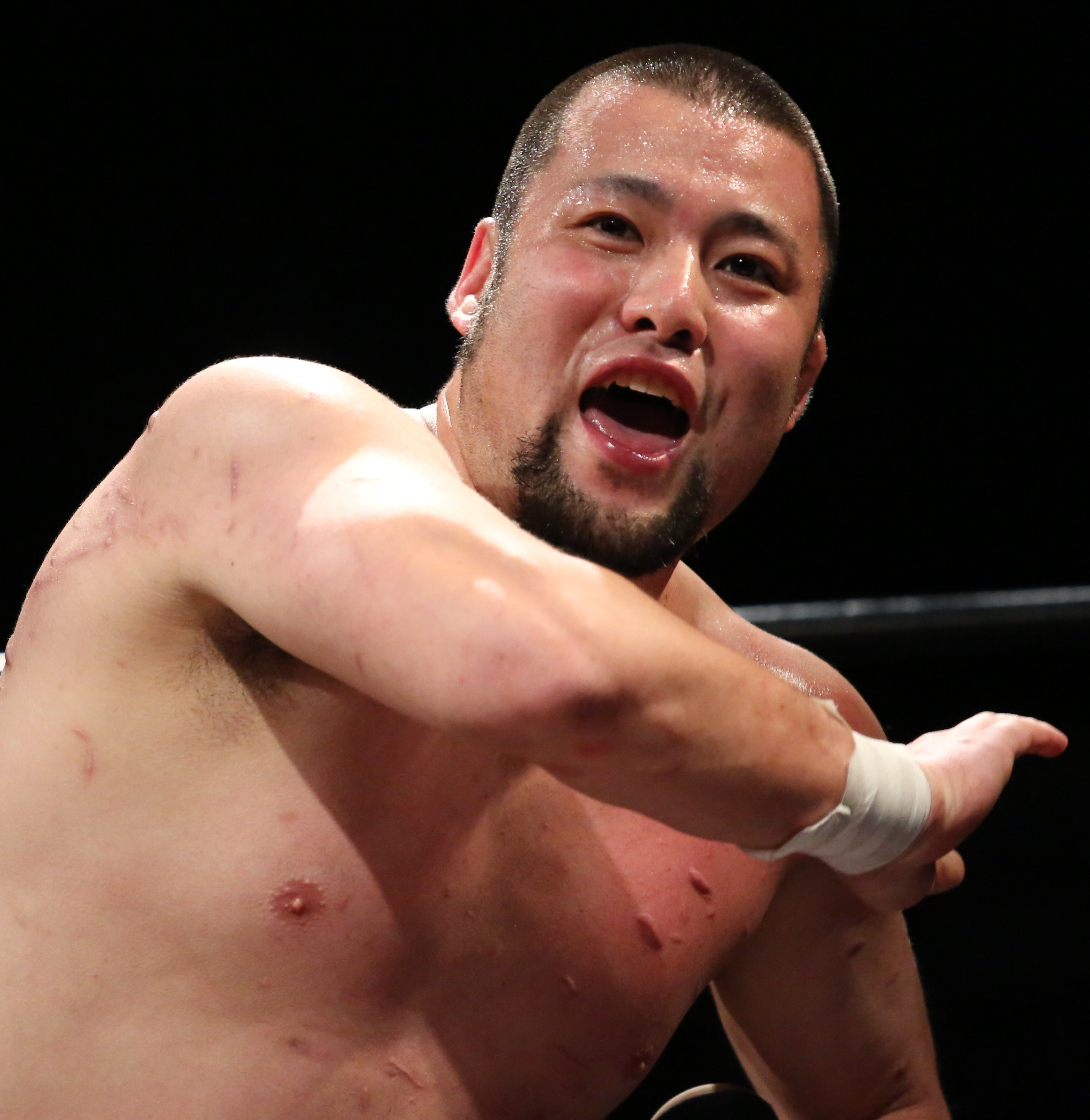
- Sekine in June 2017

Personal information
- Born: June 11, 1988 (age 38) Sukagawa, Fukushima, Japan
- Spouse: Nodoka Tenma (m. 2022)

Professional wrestling career
- Ring name(s): Trans-Am*Hiroshi #8; Karate Brahman #2; Ryuselmo Sekine; Danbira Sekine; Ryuichi Sekine
- Billed height: 1.70 m (5 ft 7 in)
- Billed weight: 85 kg (187 lb)
- Trained by: Taka Michinoku
- Debut: 2008

Ryuichi Sekine (関根龍一, Sekine Ryūichi) is a Japanese professional wrestler, currently working as a freelancer and is best known for his time in the professional wrestling promotion Kaientai Dojo (K-Dojo).

== Professional wrestling career ==
=== Independent circuit (2008–present) ===
Sekine is known for his tenures with various promotions. He worked for All Japan Pro Wrestling (AJPW), making sporadic appearances starting with AJPW Chiba Extra Dream from March 16, 2013, where he competed in a losing effort against Atsushi Aoki. At while later, on July 20, 2014, on the fourth night of the AJPW Summer Action Series 2014 event, he fell short to Yoshinobu Kanemaru. He scored some notable participations in Wrestle-1 (W-1), where on the second night of the Wrestle-1 Tour 2017 Shining Winter from December 3, he competed in a 11-man royal rumble also involving Kaz Hayashi, Seiki Yoshioka and Masayuki Kono. On the same night, he teamed up with Daigoro Kashiwa in a losing effort to Manabu Soya and Nosawa Rongai. At Gatoh Move ChocoPro #83, an event promoted by Gatoh Move Pro Wrestling (Gatoh Move) on January 23, 2021, he teamed up with Hagane Shinnou in a losing effort to Mei Suruga and Baliyan Akki.

=== Big Japan Pro Wrestling (2008–present) ===
Sekine made his debut in Big Japan Pro Wrestling (BJW) on April 30, 2009 at a house show hosted in partnership with Kaientai Dojo (K-Dojo) where he teamed up with Taishi Takizawa in a losing effort to Atsushi Ohashi and Yoshihito Sasaki. He participated in one of the longest matches in professional wrestling history, a 108-man battle royal at Tenka Sanbun no Kei: New Year's Eve Special, a cross-over event held between BJW, DDT and K-Dojo from December 31, 2009, competing against other infamous wrestlers such as Great Kojika, Taka Michinoku, Kenny Omega, Abdullah Kobayashi, and the winner of the match, Jun Kasai.

Sekine participated in the Saikyo Tag League multiple times. He made his first appearance at the 2014 edition of the event, teaming up with Saburo Inematsu and scoring a total of four points after going against the teams of Ryuji Ito and Abdullah Kobayashi, Yuko Miyamoto and Isami Kodaka, Kankuro Hoshino and Masato Inaba, Masashi Takeda and Jaki Numazawa, and The Brahman Brothers. His last performance was at the 2020 edition of the event where he teamed up with Ryuji Ito and won the Deathmatch Block with a total score of ten points, towering the teams of Abdullah Kobayashi and Yoshihisa Uto, Masaya Takahashi and Kyu Mogami, Masashi Takeda and Takumi Tsukamoto, Takayuki Ueki and Toshiyuki Sakuda, Yuko Miyamoto and Isami Kodaka, and Minoru Fujita and Kankuro Hoshino. They fell short in the semi-finals against Daichi Hashimoto and Hideyoshi Kamitani.

In the Ikkitousen Deathmatch Survivor, he made his first appearance at 2015 edition starting with March 1, placing himself in the Block A and scoring a total of four points after going against Masashi Takeda, Ryuji Ito, Kankuro Hoshino, Jaki Numazawa and Masaya Takahashi. His last presence was at the 2019 edition of the event, where in the A Block he scored a total of six points after competing against Isami Kodaka, Abdullah Kobayashi, Jimmy Havoc, Ryuji Ito, Yuko Miyamoto and Yoshihisa Uto.

=== DDT Pro-Wrestling (2008–2020) ===
Sekine regularly worked for DDT's sub-brand Pro-Wrestling Basara (Basara), making sporadic appearances in the promotion's signature events. At Judgement 2016: DDT 19th Anniversary on March 21, Sekine participated in a 12-man battle royal for a first contendesrhip contract for the KO-D Openweight Championship also involving the winner Kazuki Hirata, Gorgeous Matsuno, Ken Ohka, Toru Owashi and others. His last appearance at the DDT Judgement event was at Judgement 2019: DDT 22nd Anniversary on February 17, where he teamed up with Daiki Shimomura as Sento Minzoku to defeat Takato Nakano and Masato Kamino.*

Sekine also worked in the DDT Into The Fight events series. He made his first appearance at Into The Fight 2016 on February 28, he teamed up with Isami Kodaka and picked up a win against Smile Squash (Yasu Urano and Akito), Shuten-dōji (Yukio Sakaguchi and Masa Takanashi) and Team Dream Futures (Keisuke Ishii and Soma Takao) in a Four-way tag team match. At Into The Fight 2018 on February 25, Sekine teamed up with Ryota Nakatsu and Fuminori Abe and unsuccessfully challenged Shuten-dōji (Kudo, Yukio Sakaguchi and Masahiro Takanashi) for the KO-D 6-Man Tag Team Championship.

Another popular event promoted by DDT where he competed was the Ultimate Party 2019 from November 3, where he dropped the Union Max Championship to Masahiro Takanashi.

In 2020, when Basara split from DDT to become an independent company, he continued his tenure with it.

=== New Japan Pro Wrestling (2011–2013) ===
Sekine worked for a brief period of time in New Japan Pro Wrestling (NJPW). At NEVER.9: Road To The Super Junior 2, he picked up a victory over Takaaki Watanabe in the first night from April 13, 2012. Two days later, on the semi-finals from April 15, he fell short to Nosawa Rongai who portraited the gimmick of Black Tiger. In a first-round match of the NEVER Tokyo SHIBUYA-AX: NEVER Openweight Championship Tournament which took place on November 15, 2012, he fell short to Yoshi-Hashi. On the finals of the same event from November 19, he teamed up with Daisuke Sasaki and Hiro Tonai, unsuccessfully challenging Bushi, Hiromu Takahashi and Kushida in a six-man tag team match.

== Personal life ==
Sekine married fellow professional wrestler Nodoka Tenma in December 2022.

== Championships and accomplishments ==
- Big Japan Pro Wrestling

- Yokohama Shopping Street 6-Man Tag Team Championship (1 time) – with Isami Kodaka and Minoru Fujita

- DDT Pro-Wrestling/Pro-Wrestling Basara

- Ironman Heavymetalweight Championship (1 time)
- Union Max Championship (1 time)
- UWA World Trios Championship (1 time) – with Isami Kodaka and Daiki Shimomura
- Iron Fist Tag Team Championship (1 time) – with Fuma
- Iron Fist Tag Tournament (2018) – with Ryota Nakatsu

- Kaientai Dojo

- Strongest-K Tag Team Championship (2 times) – with Kengo Mashimo
- UWA World Middleweight Championship (2 times)
- FMW/WEW Hardcore Tag Team Championship (4 times) – with Kotaro Nasu (1), Saburo Inematsu (1) and Kengo Mashimo (2)

- Pro Wrestling Zero1

- NWA International Lightweight Tag Team Championship (1 time) – with Ryota Nakatsu
