= Tsutomu Oosugi =

Japanese professional wrestler

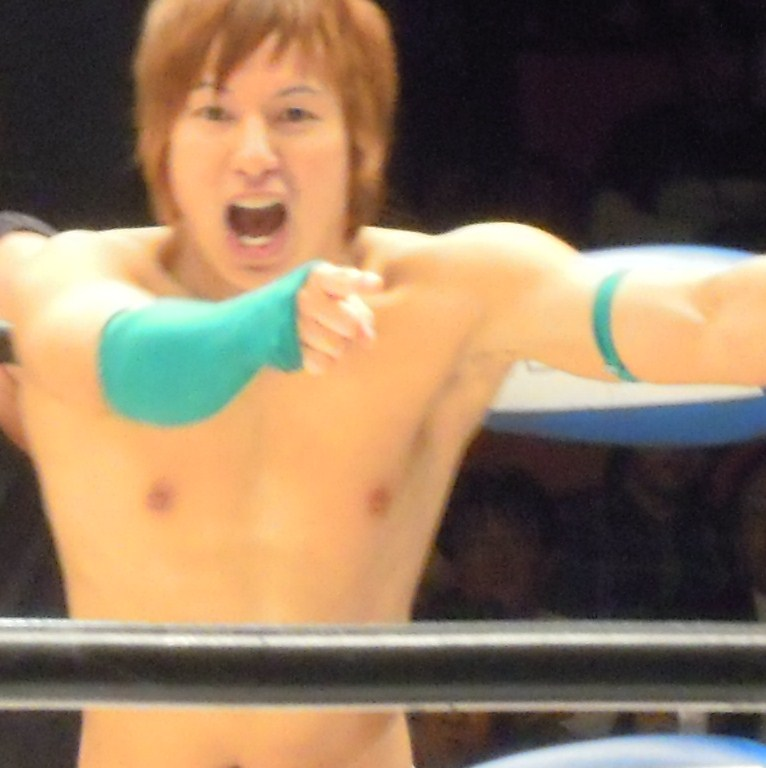
- Oosugi in May 2010

Personal information
- Born: Tsutomu Oosugi; January 10, 1985 (age 41) Miki, Hyōgo, Japan

Professional wrestling career
- Ring name(s): Harley Quinn #2; Kamesshi #2; Medochi; Milanito Collection a.t. Milanito Collection gay.t. Rei; R2D2-#2; Sagojo; Steppenwolf #2; Tsutomu Oosugi; Yapper Man #2
- Billed height: 1.62 m (5 ft 4 in)
- Billed weight: 62 kg (137 lb)
- Trained by: Último Dragón; Jorge "Skayde" Rivera; Negro Navarro
- Debut: May 16, 2004

Tsutomu Oosugi (大杉勉, Ōsugi Tsutomu; born January 10, 1985) is a Japanese professional wrestler. He currently wrestles as a freelancer in the Japanese independent circuit and as a regular in both Michinoku Pro Wrestling (Michinoku Pro) and Big Japan Pro Wrestling (BJW). His ring name is written in katakana as Tsutomu Oosugi (ツトム・オースギ).

== Professional wrestling career ==
=== Toryumon (2004–2005) ===
Oosugi debuted for Toryumon Mexico on May 16, 2004 under the name of Milanito Collection a.t., a smaller version of the Milano Collection AT gimmick. This was another in the long line of Toryumon tribute gimmicks, with the main example being the Mini Crazy MAX unit. However, like many of the Toryumon X characters, he never made it into the main Toryumon system as Ultimo Dragon split his school from the promotion, which would go on to become Dragon Gate (DG).

=== Dragondoor and El Dorado Wrestling (2005–2008) ===
Milanito would land in the dragondoor promotion, joining Taiji Ishimori in his faction against the Aagan Iisou stable, led by Shuji Kondo. Later dragondoor was moved onto El Dorado Wrestling, where he continued the Milanito gimmick and formed a tag team with El Blazer. Although they had important victories over factions like Aagan Iisou and STONED, the team broke when Blazer left El Dorado, depressing Milanito and forcing him to search for a new partner.

When the big Dorado unit shuffle took place, Milanito was selected by ace Shuji Kondo to join his SUKIYAKI stable. However, the concept as a whole failed, with most of Milanito's top matches in late 2007 occurring as part of the Big Japan "MEN's Club" angle. During his feud with Danshoku Dino, Milanito debuted a homosexual aspect to his character, using the name Milano Collection gay.t and finishing his matches with a Canadian Destroyer variation where the opponent's head would be stuffed into his trunks. This spilled over into El Dorado, where a feud with Hercules Oosenga over their entrance backup dancers lead to Milanito using male bodybuilders instead of women. Oosenga would defeat Milanito and thus take away Milanito's right to use backup dancers, and the Milanito gimmick as a whole was sealed on December 29, 2007, when he lost a match to Milano Collection A.T.

Now without his main gimmick, Milanito returned later in 2008 under his real name, Tsutomu Oosugi, and formed a tag team with Hercules Senga, known as Speed of Sounds. The two proved to be a very successful duo, wrestling a high-speed style reminiscent of the Motor City Machine Guns or Paul London and Brian Kendrick. They were permanent fixtures on El Dorado cards.

=== Michinoku Pro Wrestling (2006–present) ===
The same year of his debut in El Dorado, Oosugi debuted in Michinoku Pro as Rei, a masked character representing a spirit of the forest. Initially face, Rei was defeated by Ken45º in order to turn him a member of his heel stable Ken Gundan along Mototsugu Shimizu and Banana Senga, changing his costume from white to black. However, the stable was dissolved and Rei returned to the face side. Then Rei adopted a purple outfit and mask based in the Evangelion Unit 01 from Neon Genesis Evangelion, having a successful feud with Shibaten. In 2008, Oosugi changed his gimmick to Yapper Man #2, taken from the anime Yatterman.

=== Big Japan Pro Wrestling (2008–present) ===
While part of El Dorado, Milanito started wrestling for Big Japan Pro Wrestling (BJW). Later as Speed of Sounds, they became a part of Mens Teioh's "Men's Club" junior cruiserweight matches, increasing their apparitions over the years until making the promotion their main field in 2015.

== Championships and accomplishments ==
- El Dorado Wrestling

- UWA World Tag Team Championship (1 time) – with Hercules Senga

- Big Japan Pro Wrestling/Kohaku Wrestling Wars

- UWA World Tag Team Championship (5 times) – with Hercules Senga

- Michinoku Pro Wrestling

- Tohoku Tag Team Championship (1 time) – with Yapper Man #1
- Futaritabi Tag Team Tournament (2010) – with Yapper Man #1

- Pro-Wrestling Basara

- Iron Fist Tag Team Championship (2 times, current) – with Banana Senga

- Pro Wrestling Illustrated

- PWI ranked him #321 of the top 500 singles wrestlers in the PWI 500 in 2006

- TTT Pro-Wrestling

- GWC 6-Man Tag Team Championship (1 time) – with Guts Ishijima and Banana Senga
