= Saget =

Saget is a surname. Notable people with the name include:

== People ==
- Bob Saget (1956–2022), American stand-up comedian, actor, and television host
- Jean-Marie Saget (1929–2020), French military pilot and test pilot for Dassault Aviation
- Jean-Nicolas Nissage Saget (1810–1880), President of Haiti

== Characters ==
- Walter Saget, a fictional character from Drawn Together

== See also ==
- Sagat (name), given name and surname
