= Tatsuhito Senga =

Japanese professional wrestler (born 1984)

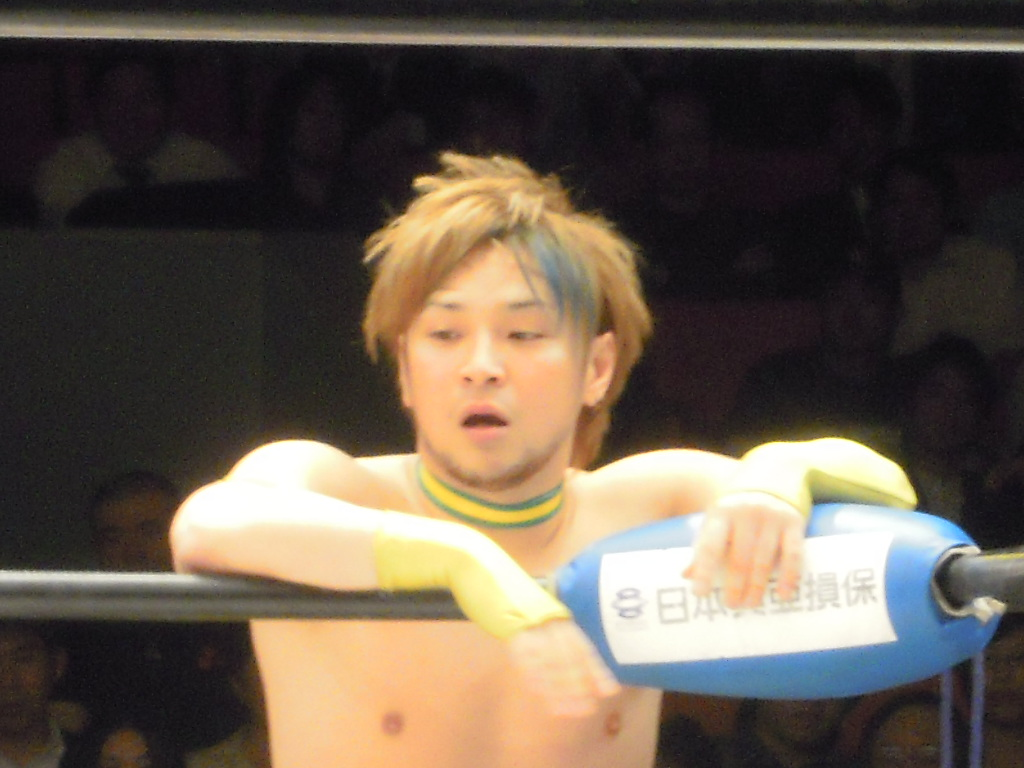
- Senga in May 2011

Personal information
- Born: January 2, 1984 (age 42) Toyonaka, Osaka, Japan

Professional wrestling career
- Ring names: Banana Senga; C3PO-#1; Chohakkai; Deadshot #1; DEWA Lock Man; Hercules Oosenga; Hercules Senga; Kamesshi #1; Lex Luthor #1; RONIN; Shibaten; Tatsuhito Senga; Yapper Man #1
- Billed height: 1.62 m (5 ft 4 in)
- Billed weight: 60 kg (132 lb)
- Trained by: Último Dragón; Jorge "Skayde" Rivera
- Debut: December 11, 2004

Tatsuhito Senga (千賀 達人, Senga Tatsuhito; born 2 January 1984) is a Japanese professional wrestler better known by his ring names Hercules Senga (ヘラクレス・センガ, Herakuresu Senga) and Banana Senga (バナナ千賀). He currently wrestles as a freelancer in the Japanese independent circuit and as a regular in both Michinoku Pro Wrestling (Michinoku Pro) and Big Japan Pro Wrestling (BJW).

== Professional wrestling career ==
=== Toryumon (2004–2006) ===
After training in the Último Dragón Gym, Senga made his pro wrestling debut in Toryumon Mexico on December 11, 2004, under his real name. After some events, Senga changed his ring name to Banana Senga and became a member of the salsa-themed heel stable Los Salseros Japoneses (Takeshi Minamino, Pineapple Hanai and Mango Fukuda) along his classmate Passion Hasegawa.

=== Michinoku Pro Wrestling (2006–present) ===
In 2006, he was moved to Michinoku Pro Wrestling (Michinoku Pro), where he wrestled mainly in low-card matches. After the fall of Los Salseros, Senga was defeated by Ken45º and forced into his stable Ken Gundan, but the stable dissolved shortly after and Senga turned face, keeping his salsa mannerisms for comedic effect. Senga also played Shibaten, a kappa-based character, and had a feud with Rei. The gimmick lasted until 2009, when he adopted the gimmick of Yapper Man #1, taken from the anime Yatterman.

=== El Dorado Wrestling (2006–2008) ===
When El Dorado Wrestling (El Dorado) was created in 2006, Senga was brought in by his Toryumon comrades and formed an alliance with Toru Owashi. In 2007, Owashi, founded a stable called Animal Planets, which had an animal theme. Thus, Senga adopted the name of Hercules Oosenga, based on the Hercules Ookabuto, and started to wear beetle-like horns during his entrance. He feuded with Milanito Collection a.t. and defeated him in a backup dancers deprivation match, which caused a losing streak to Milanito and occasioned the loss of his gimmick, becoming Tsutomu Oosugi.

After the Animal Planets demise in 2008, Senga changed his name to Hercules Senga and abandoned his beetle traits. He reconciled with Oosugi and formed a tag team with him, known as Speed of Sounds. The two proved to be a very successful duo, wrestling a high-speed style reminiscent of the Motor City Machine Guns or Paul London and Brian Kendrick. They were permanent fixtures on El Dorado cards until the promotion's closure in 2008.

=== Big Japan Pro Wrestling (2008–present) ===
While part of El Dorado, Hercules Oosenga started wrestling for Big Japan Pro Wrestling (BJW). Later as Speed of Sounds, they became a part of Mens Teioh's "Men's Club" junior cruiserweight matches, increasing their apparitions over the years until making the promotion their main field in 2015.

=== Pro Wrestling Noah, Mexico and All Japan Pro Wrestling (2010) ===
In 2010, Senga debuted in Pro Wrestling Noah (Noah) as Ronin, a creepy samurai ghost, and attacked Sugi after a match against Taiji Ishimori. The two had a heated feud both in Noah and AAA and toured Mexico. Ronin became an ally of Dark Family (Dark Cuervo and Dark Ozz) and had matches in All Japan Pro Wrestling (AJPW), being defeated at the end by the returning Sugi.

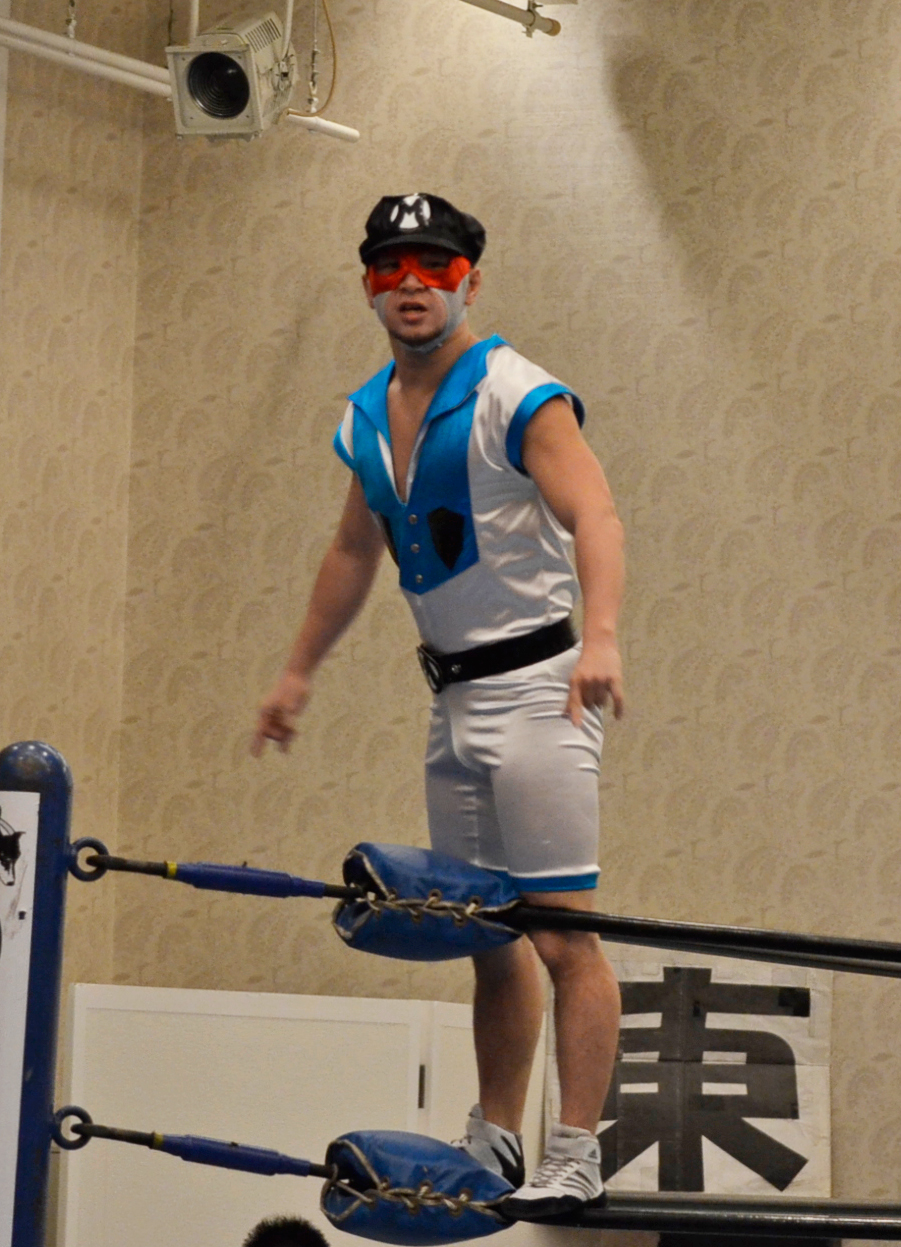
Senga as Yapper Man #1

== Championships and accomplishments ==
- Big Japan Pro Wrestling/El Dorado Wrestling/Kohaku Wrestling Wars

- UWA World Tag Team Championship (5 times) – with Tsutomu Oosugi
- 5 Minute Time Limit 1 Day Tournament (2013)

- Michinoku Pro Wrestling

- Tohoku Tag Team Championship (1 time) – with Yapper Man #2
- Michinoku Tag League (2010) – with Yapper Man#2
- Futaritabi Tag Team Tournament (2016, 2019) – with Tsutomu Oosugi

- Pro-Wrestling Basara

- Iron Fist Tag Team Championship (2 times) – with Tsutomu Oosugi
- Union Max Championship (1 time)

- TTT Pro-Wrestling

- GWC 6-Man Tag Team Championship (1 time) – with Guts Ishijima and Tsutomu Oosugi
- TTT Indie Unified Tag Team Championship (2 time) – with Tsutomu Oosugi
- TTT Indie Unified Tag Team Title First Champion Decision Tournament (2021) – with Tsutomu Oosugi
- TTT Indie Unified Six Man Tag Team Championship (7 time, current) – with Koju Takeda (1) and Maya Yukihi (1), Men's Teioh (1) and Tsutomu Oosugi (2), Ken Ohka (1) and Tsutomu Oosugi (3), Masato Kamino (1, current), Takato Nakano(1, current)
