= Daiki Shimomura =

Japanese professional wrestler

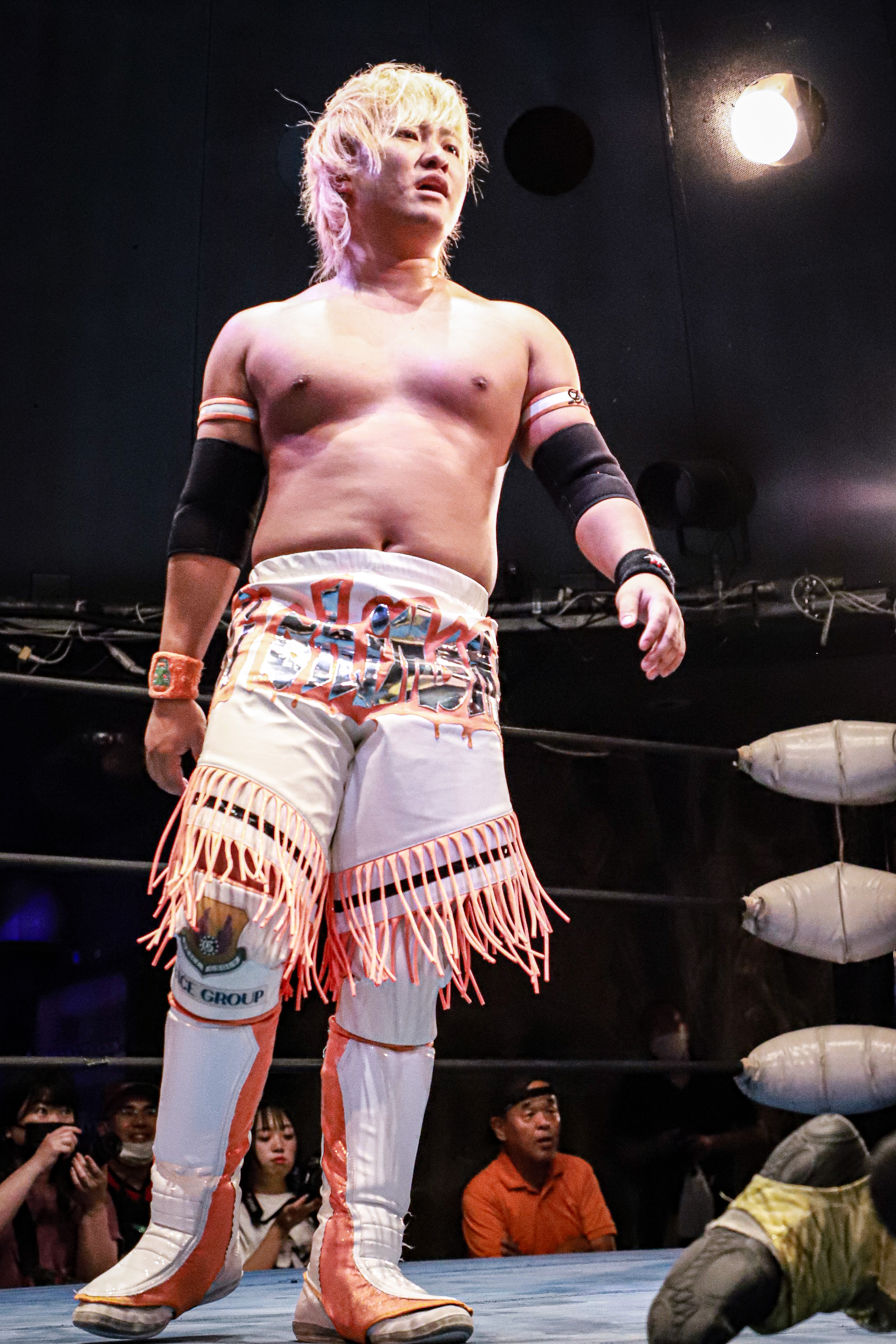
- Shimomura in July 2023

Personal information
- Born: January 9, 1998 (age 28) Saitama, Japan

Professional wrestling career
- Ring names: Daiki; Hiranito Collection A.T.; Daiki Shimomura
- Billed height: 163 cm (5 ft 4 in)
- Billed weight: 70 kg (154 lb)
- Trained by: Yasu Urano
- Debut: 2014

Daiki Shimomura (下村 大樹, Shimomura Daiki; born January 9, 1998) is a Japanese professional wrestler currently working as a freelancer. He performs on the independent circuit. He is best known for his tenure with the Japanese promotion DDT Pro Wrestling (DDT).

== Professional wrestling career ==
=== Independent circuit (2014–present) ===
Shimomura made his professional wrestling debut in Nukui Kusa Wrestling (nkw), on May 17, 2014, under the name Daiki (stylized DAIKI). He graduated from nkw in 2015.

He is known for his work in various promotions. At K-DOJO Chiba Festival 2019, an event promoted by Kaientai Dojo (K-Dojo) on May 2, 2019, he teamed up with fellow Sento Minzoku stablemates Ryuichi Sekine and Isami Kodaka and unsuccessfully challenged Ayato Yoshida, Tank Nagai and Tatsuya Hanami for the Chiba Six Man Tag Team Championship. At Gatoh Move Gtmv #14, an event promoted by Gatoh Move Pro Wrestling on October 31, 2019, Shimomura teamed up with Ryuichi Sekine in a losing effort to Chris Brookes and Masahiro Takanashi.

=== DDT Pro-Wrestling (2015–2019) ===
In 2015, Shimomura became a trainee in DDT New Attitude (DNA), a developmental sub-brand of DDT Pro-Wrestling that ran from 2014 to 2018. He had his first match at DNA14, a house show promoted by DDT on March 5, 2016, where he fell short to Kota Umeda.

Shimomura is known for his appearances in various signature events of the promotion. One of them is the DDT Peter Pan, working his first match at Ryōgoku Peter Pan 2016 on August 28 where he teamed up with Kazusada Higuchi to defeat Kouki Iwasaki and Mizuki Watase.

In 2017, Shimomura made his first appearance at a DDT Judgement event, at Judgement 2017: DDT 20th Anniversary on March 20 where he teamed up with Rekka and Yuki Ueno in a losing effort to Nobuhiro Shimatani, Naomi Yoshimura and Dai Suzuki. He marked his last Peter Pan appearance at Ryōgoku Peter Pan 2017 on August 20 where he teamed up with Mizuki Watase, Rekka and Diego to defeat Tomomitsu Matsunaga, Hoshitango, Nobuhiro Shimatani and Masato Kamino in an eight-man tag team match.

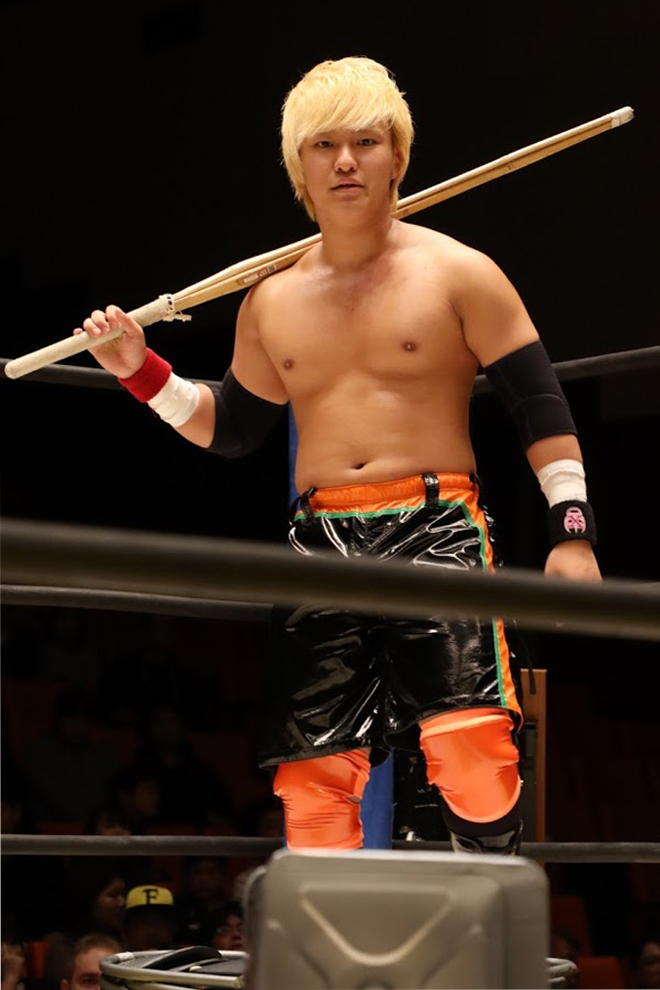
Shimomura in July 2020

In 2018, the DNA brand was retired and Shimomura was assigned to the Basara brand. At DDT/Saki Akai Produce DDT Collection on March 14, 2018, Shimomura participated in a 27-person battle royal in which the winner was granted the position of general manager for one night. Shimomura came unsuccessfully in front of the winner Kazuki Hirata and other notable participants such as Antonio Honda, Akito, Danshoku Dino, Konosuke Takeshita, Maki Itoh, Yuko Miyamoto and others. At Judgement 2018: DDT 21st Anniversary, on March 25, he teamed up with Nobuhiro Shimatani as Gran MilliMeters, Mizuki Watase, Rekka, and Takato Nakano in a losing effort to Tomomitsu Matsunaga, Hoshitango, Mad Paulie, Cherry and Gota Ihashi in a Ten-person tag team match.

He marked his last Judgement appearance at Judgement 2019: DDT 22nd Anniversary on February 17, where he teamed up with his fellow Sento Minzoku stablemate Ryuichi Sekine to defeat Takato Nakano and Masato Kamino by submission. He also participated in the DDT Ultimate Party branch of events. His single appearance was at Ultimate Party 2019 on November 3 where he teamed up with Minoru Fujita, unsuccessfully challenging the champions Damnation (Daisuke Sasaki and Soma Takao), All Out (Akito and Shunma Katsumata) and Iron Priest (Fuma and Yusuke Kubo) in a Four-way hardcore match for the KO-D Tag Team Championship.

=== Pro-Wrestling Basara (2020–2023) ===
On January 1, 2020, the Pro-Wrestling Basara brand officially split up from DDT and became an independent company. Shimomura stayed with the new company as a full-time member. At BJW Osaka Surprise 53 ~ Zero Gravity 2021 on August 8, Shimomura teamed up with Minoru Fujita and Isami Kodaka to win the UWA World Trios Championship for the second time after defeating Andy Wu, Hub and Ultimate Spider Jr.

On October 20, 2023, Shimomura was suspended by Basara for a year due to inappropriate conduct of an undisclosed nature.

== Championships and accomplishments ==
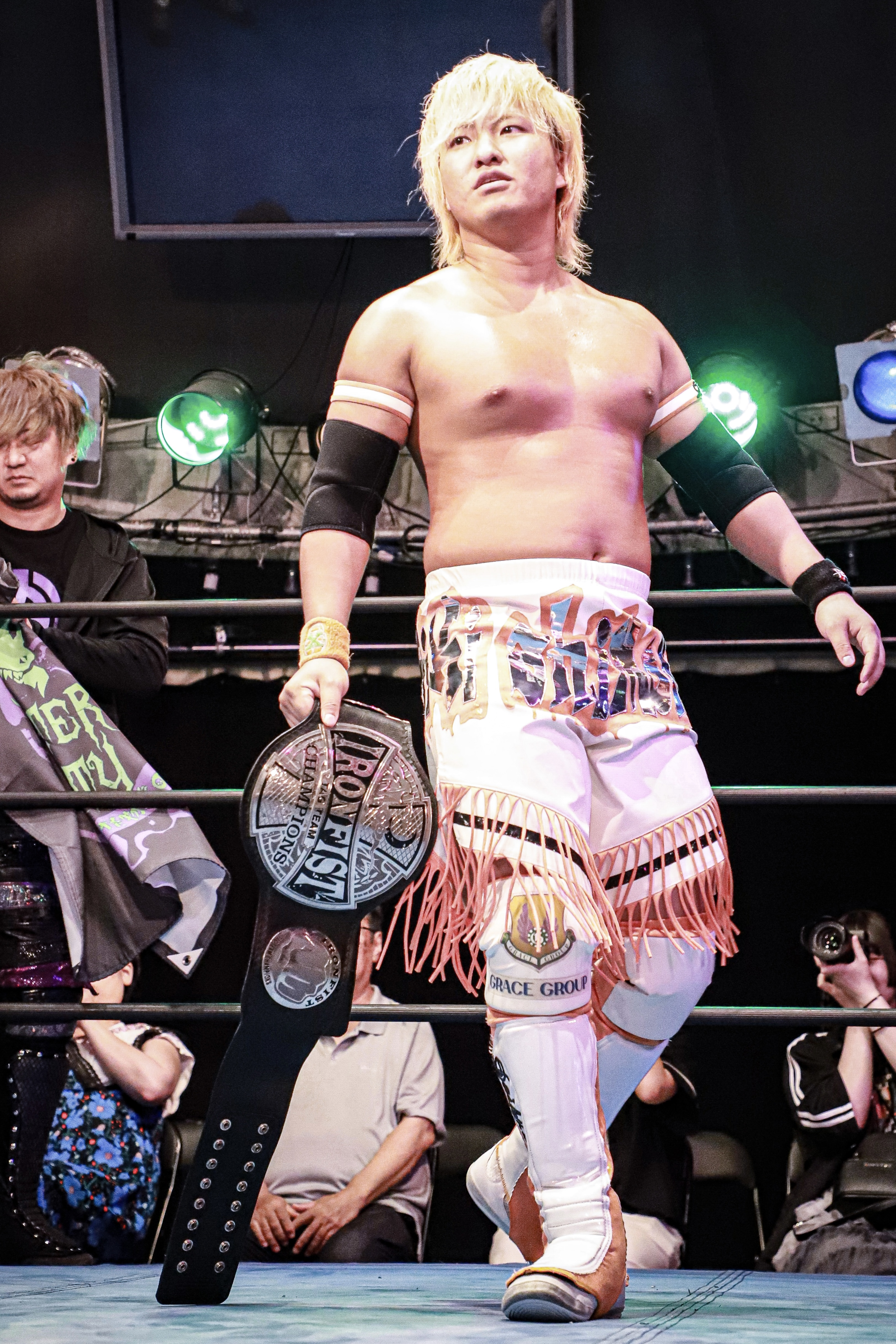
In Basara, Shimomura is a former Iron Fist Tag Team Champion

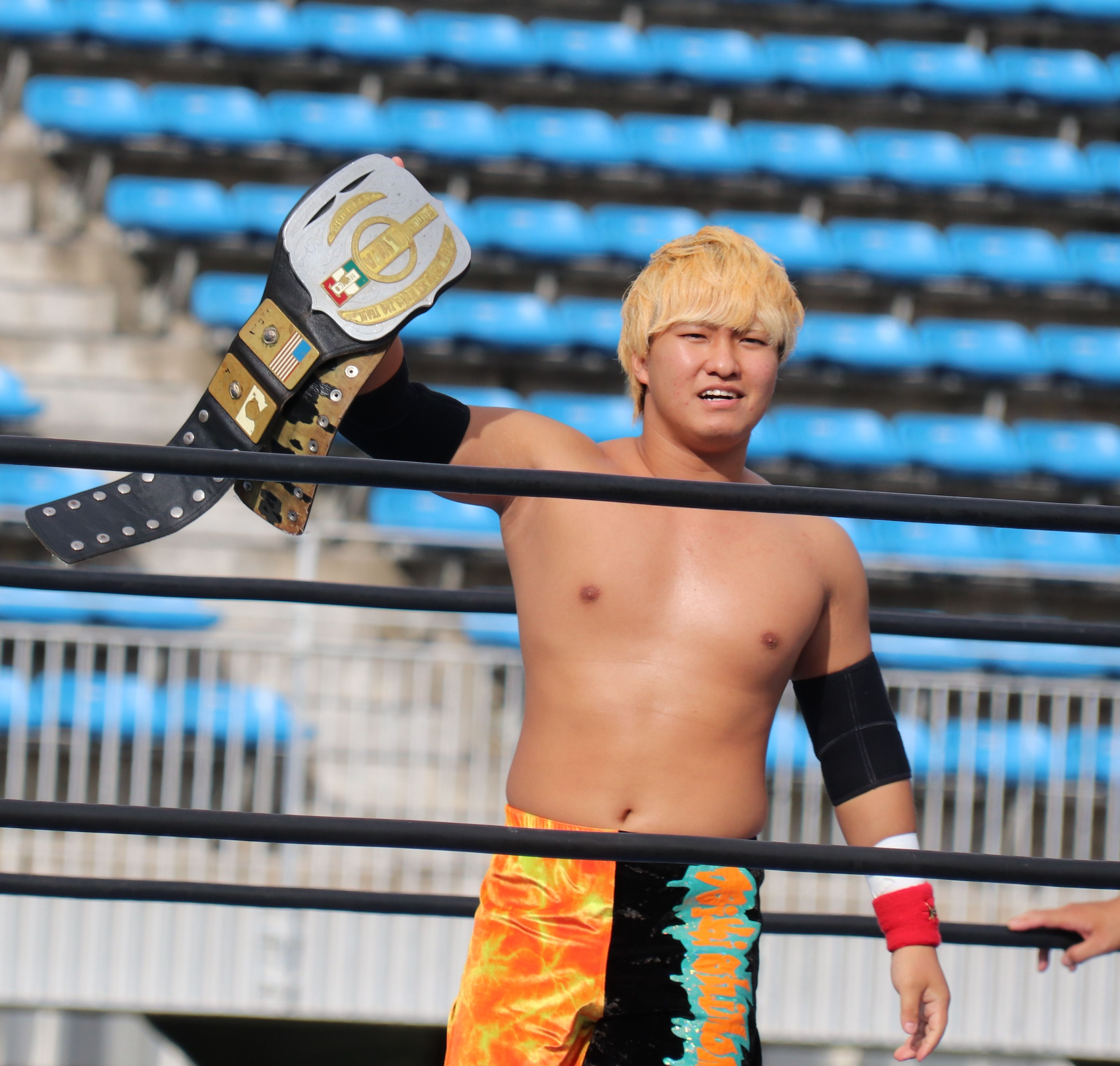
In BJW, he is a former UWA World Trios Champion

- Big Japan Pro Wrestling
  - UWA World Trios Championship (2 times) – with Isami Kodaka and Ryuichi Sekine (1) and Isami Kodaka and Minoru Fujita (1)
- Pro-Wrestling Basara
  - Iron Fist Tag Team Championship (4 times) – with Isami Kodaka (2), Minoru Fujita (1, interim) and Takumi Tsukamoto (1)
  - Benmaru Tournament 0 (2018)
  - Iron Fist Tag Tournament (2020) – with Isami Kodaka and (2026) – with Shuichiro Katsumura
