= Yasu Urano =

Japanese professional wrestler

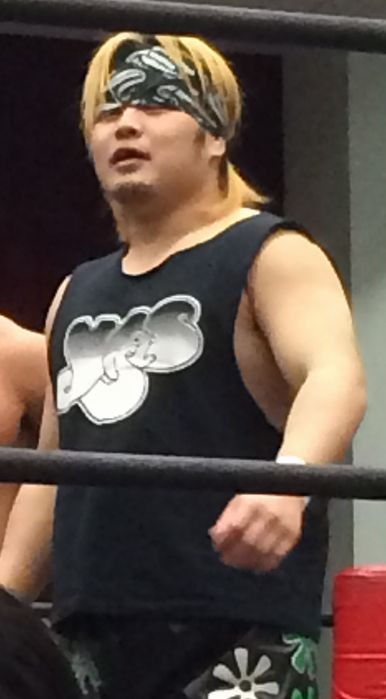
- Urano, in a Yes t-shirt, in 2015

Personal information
- Born: February 19, 1976 (age 50) Tokorozawa, Japan
- Education: Nihon University

Professional wrestling career
- Ring name(s): Yasuura Urano; Taz Urano; Yasu Urano
- Billed height: 1.74 m (5 ft 9 in)
- Billed weight: 87 kg (192 lb)
- Trained by: Koji Nakagawa; Taka Michinoku
- Debut: 2000

Yasu Urano (ヤス・ウラノ, Yasu Urano) is a Japanese freelance professional wrestler. He is best known for his tenures with the Dramatic Dream Team (DDT) and Active Advance Pro Wrestling wrestling promotions.

== Professional wrestling career ==
=== Independent circuit (2001–present) ===
Urano's first documented match was at an IWA Puerto Rico house show on January 11, 2001, where he defeated Hiroki Tanabe. During the early stages of his career, he made appearances at events hosted by Frontier Martial-Arts Wrestling. On August 11, 2001 at FMW Super Dynamism, he joined Tomokazu Morita in a losing effort against Naohiko Yamazaki and Ricky Fuji.

On July 2, 2017 Urano defeated Andromeda Ken at Pro-Wrestling ACE Vol. 6, an event hosted by Wrestle-1. He also wrestled a match for the joshi puroresu promotion Ice Ribbon at Ice Ribbon Tax Pro Wrestling Vol. 5 on February 21, 2021, where he teamed up with Ram Kaicho and Onryo; the trio lost to Fuminori Abe, Koju Takeda and Taro Yamada in a six-man intergender tag team match. At the 2AW Fujita Pro Wrestling School Performance ~ Winter Special Lesson, hosted by Active Advance Pro Wrestling on February 15, 2020, Urano teamed up with Yuko Miyamoto and Yuma to defeat Kyu Mogami, Shu Asakawa and Taishi Takizawa.

==== Dramatic Dream Team/DDT Pro Wrestling (2006–present) ====
Urano participated at Budokan Peter Pan on August 18, 2012, where he competed in a "5 vs. 5 soccer match" - a variant of an iron man tag team match where tiebreaks were decided by a soccer penalty shoot-out. He teamed up with Antonio Honda, Yuji Hino, Tanomusaku Toba and Yoshiko as Akira-waku FC, and lost with a score of 2–2 (2–0 on penalties) against Tonkatsu SC (Masa Takanashi, Daisuke Sasaki, Hoshitango, Tetsuya Endo and Tsukasa Fujimoto). On May 28, 2017 at DDT Audience, Urano unsuccessfully challenged Konosuke Takeshita for the KO-D Openweight Championship. At DDT Sweet Dreams! on January 29, 2017, he unsuccessfully challenged All Japan Pro Wrestling's Keisuke Ishii for the AJPW World Junior Heavyweight Championship.

Urano teamed up with Takato Nakano and Takumi Tsukamoto at DDT BASARA 105 ~ Manji No Kitsune 2 Hikime ~ on September 14, 2019, to defeat Sento Minzoku (Daiki Shimomura, Isami Kodaka and Ryuichi Sekine) and win the UWA World Trios Championship. Urano is a former multiple-time Ironman Heavymetalweight Champion; he last competed for the title at Judgement 2019: DDT 22nd Anniversary in a gauntlet battle royal against Yuka Sakazaki, El Lindaman, Asuka, eventual winner Saki Akai, and several other wrestlers.

== Championships and accomplishments ==
- Dove Pro Wrestling

- Independent World Junior Heavyweight Championship (1 time)

- Dramatic Dream Team/DDT Pro-Wrestling

- Ironman Heavymetalweight Championship (6 times)
- Jiyūgaoka 6-Person Tag Team Championship (1 time) – with Kudo and Antonio Honda
- KO-D Tag Team Championship (5 times) – with Yuji Hino (2), Gentaro (1), Kudo (1) and Harashima (1)
- KO-D 6-Man Tag Team Championship (1 time) – with Akito and Harashima

- Ice Ribbon

- Triangle Ribbon Championship (1 time)

- Kaientai Dojo

- Strongest-K Tag Team Championship (1 time) – with Handsome Joe
- UWA World Middleweight Championship (2 times)

- Michinoku Pro Wrestling

- UWA World Tag Team Championship (1 time) – with Hiroki

- Professional Wrestling Just Tap Out
  - King of JTO Championship (1 time)
- Pro-Wrestling Basara

- Iron Fist Tag Team Championship (1 time) – with Takumi Tsukamoto
- UWA World Trios Championship (1 time) – with Takato Nakano and Takumi Tsukamoto
