= Shota (wrestler) =

Japanese professional wrestler

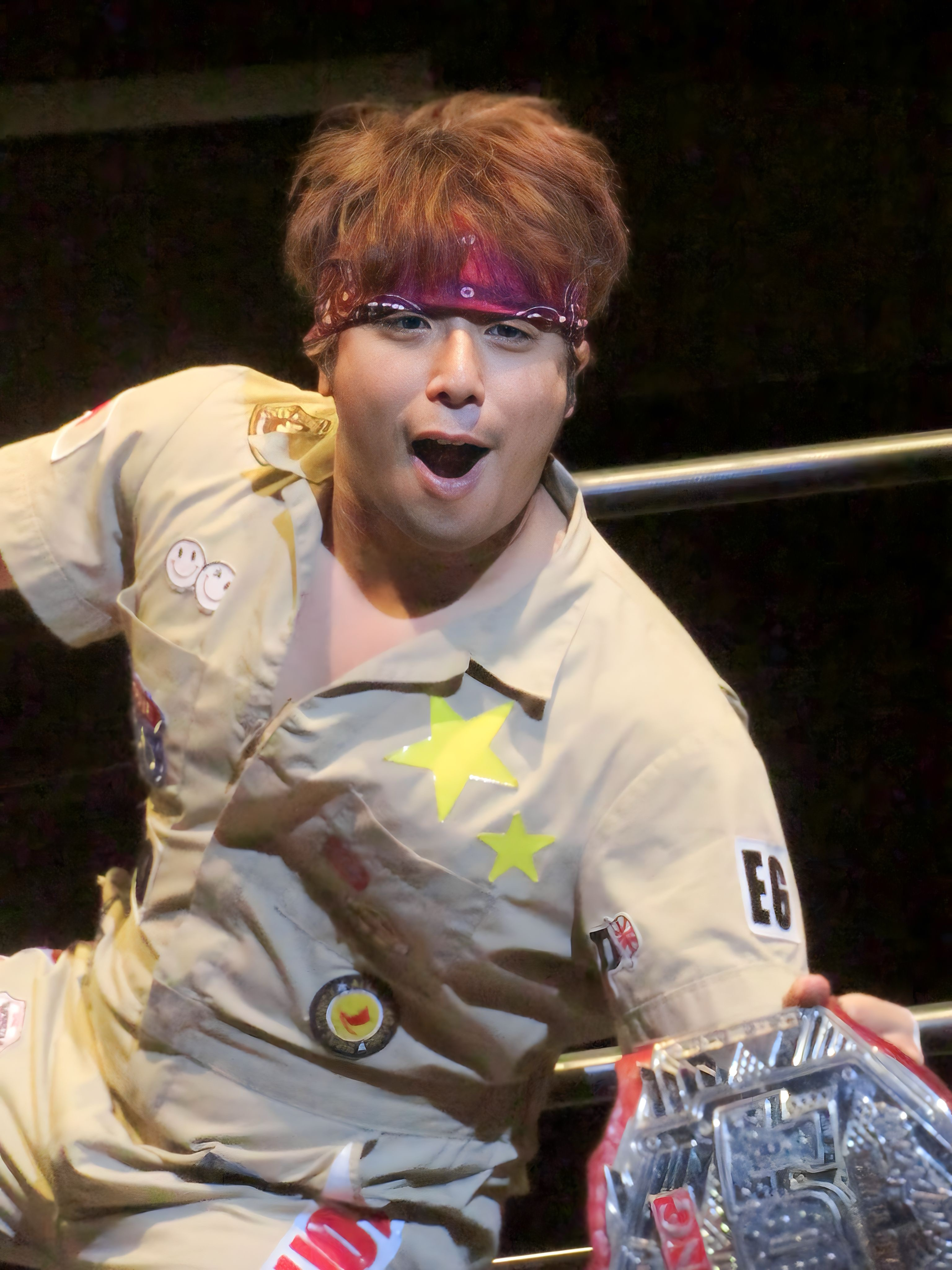
- Shota in January 2024

Personal information
- Born: August 10, 1988 (age 37) Tokyo, Japan

Professional wrestling career
- Ring name(s): Nazo Fukumen C Mozuku Man; Shota
- Billed height: 160 cm (5 ft 3 in)
- Billed weight: 75 kg (165 lb)
- Debut: 2008

Shota Suzuki (鈴木翔太, Suzuki Shōta) better known mononymously by his ring name Shota is a Japanese professional wrestler and referee currently working as a freelancer and is best known for his time with the Japanese promotions DDT Pro-Wrestling and Kaientai Dojo.

== Professional wrestling career ==
=== Independent circuit (2008–present) ===
Suzuki made his professional wrestling debut at a house show promoted by Style-E Pro Wrestling on April 19, 2008 where he fell short to Tomohiko Hashimoto.

As a freelancer, he is known for competing in various promotions. At K-DOJO K-Special, an event promoted by Kaientai Dojo on November 27, 2011, Suzuki teamed up with Micro and Quiet Storm in a losing effort to Bambi, Ricky Fuji and Yuji Hino. At W-1 Wrestle-1 Tour 2016 W-Impact from February 10, he teamed up with Masayuki Mitomi and competed in a four-way tag team match also involving Tajiri and Tatsuhiko Yoshino, TriggeR (Masayuki Kono and Shuji Kondo) and Jackets (Seiki Yoshioka and Yasufumi Nakanoue). At BJW Great Kojika Birth Anniversary 74th, an event promoted by Big Japan Pro Wrestling on April 28, 2016, he wrestled Mototsugu Shimizu and Atsushi Maruyama in a three-way match unsuccessfully. At AJPW Red Holy Night, an event produced by All Japan Pro Wrestling on December 24, 2016, he teamed up with Trans-Am Hiroshi in a losing effort to Masanobu Fuchi and Ryuji Hijikata. At Gatoh Move Gtmv #30, an event promoted by Gatoh Move Pro Wrestling on January 11, 2020, he wrestled Cherry into a double disqualification. At Hana Kimura Memorial Show from May 23, 2021, an event promoted by Kyoko Kimura to portrait one year from the passing of her daughter Hana, Suzuki teamed up with Fuma and Mil Mongoose in a losing effort to Hub, Shisaou, and Eisa8.

==== DDT Pro-Wrestling (2010–present) ====
At CyberFight Festival 2021, a cross-over event held by DDT Pro-Wrestling in partnership with Pro Wrestling Noah and Tokyo Joshi Pro Wrestling on June 6, 2021, Shota teamed up with Keisuke Ishii and Ken Ohka in a losing effort against Kouki Iwasaki, Shuichiro Katsumura and Yumehito Imanari as a result of a six-man tag team match.

Suzuki is known for competing in the promotion's signature events such as DDT Peter Pan, making his first appearance at Budokan Peter Pan on August 18, 2012 where he teamed with Kazuhiro Tamura, Masashi Takeda, Masato Shibata, Kotaro Nasu and Cho-un "Bones" Shiryu as Team Style-E in a losing effort to Team Muscle (Muscle Sakai, Pedro Takaishi, Kazuyoshi Sakai HG, Norokazu Fujioka, Mr. Magic and Seiya Morohashi). At Ryōgoku Peter Pan 2018 on October 21, he participated in a Rumble rules match won by Nobuhiro Shimatani and also involving a self-proclaimed Tiger Mask, Gorgeous Matsuno and others.

Suzuki worked most of the time for the Ganbare Pro division. At DDT Beer Garden Fight 2018 on August 2, he competed in a 20-man falls count anywhere match won by Ken Ohka and also involving Antonio Honda, Danshoku Dino, DJ Nira, Mike Bailey and others. At DDT Ganbare Fierce Battle on February 2, he teamed up with Syuri and Masayuki Mitomi in a losing effort to Shuichiro Katsumura, Mitsuhisa Sunabe and Takafumi Ito.

==== Guts World Pro Wrestling (2008–2018) ====
Suzuki wrestled in Guts Ishijima's promotion Guts World Pro Wrestling for a decade. He competed in the last show of the company, Guts World The Final ~ Bukotsu Shuen on April 25, 2018 where he teamed up with Kenichiro Arai as Hattoshite Good to win the GWC Tag Team Championship from Toru Matsunaga and Fuminori Abe.

== Championships and accomplishments ==
- DDT Pro-Wrestling
  - KO-D Tag Team Championship (1 time) – with Soma Takao
  - Independent World Junior Heavyweight Championship (1 time)
  - Ironman Heavymetalweight Championship (1 time)
  - KO-D 6-Man Tag Team Championship (1 time) – with Akito and Kazuki Hirata
  - Kokuen Park Town Championship (1 time) – with Keisuke Ishii
  - Ganbare Pro-Wrestling G3 Climax (2013)
- Guts World Pro Wrestling
  - GWC Tag Team Championship (4 times) – with Kenichiro Arai
  - GWC 6-Man Tag Team Championship (1 time) – with Kenichiro Arai and Masked Mystery
  - GWC Tag Team Title Tournament (2015) – with Kenichiro Arai
- Tenryu Project
  - International Junior Heavyweight Tag Team Championship (1 time) – with Kenichiro Arai
