= Itadaki =

Pro-Wrestling Basara event series

- Promotions: DDT (2016–2019); Basara (2020–present)
- Other name: Chōten
- First event: Itadaki (2016)
- Event gimmick: Single-elimination tournament

The Itadaki (Japanese: 頂天〜itadaki〜; lit. "Heavenly Summit"; also sometimes called Chōten, using an alternate reading of the kanji) is an annual professional wrestling tournament held by Pro-Wrestling Basara since 2016 (except in 2024). It was first held as a round-robin tournament for the first two editions, and then as a single-elimination tournament. In its current format, first round matches are held with a 10-minute time limit and two count pinfalls; the remaining matches are fought under regular rules. The winner of the tournament receives a cash prize of ¥500,000.

The number of participants in the Itadaki has varied over the years, from a lowest of 10 in 2016 to a highest of 16 since the adoption of the single-elimination format in 2018. Hiroshi Fukuda is the inaugural winner of the tournament; Ryota Nakatsu is the only three-time winner.

A similar tournament was previously held under the name Chōten (頂天) in Dove Pro Wrestling. This name was used in 2020 when the tournament was co-promoted between Basara and Dove.

== History ==
On October 7, 2015, DDT Pro-Wrestling announced the formation of its new Pro-Wrestling Basara brand, led by Isami Kodaka, as a replacement for Union Pro Wrestling (UPW), which had officially folded three days earlier. On April 14, 2016, DDT announced the Itadaki round-robin tournament for the Basara brand, to be held between May 1 and June 24. Matches were fought to one fall with a 30-minute time limit and the winner of each block was determined by a points system; two points for a victory, one point for a draw, and zero points for a loss.

In 2018, the tournament format was changed to a 16-man single-elimination tournament, and matches were now fought with no time limit. On January 1, 2020, Basara became independent from DDT. The 2020 edition was co-promoted in partnership with Dove Pro Wrestling, both as Basara's Itadaki and Dove's Chōten.

== Tournament finals ==
No.	Event	Date	City	Venue	Final	Ref.
1	Basara 14: Yūmōmuhi	June 23, 2016	Tokyo	Shinjuku Face	Isami Kodaka vs. Hiroshi Fukuda	
2	Basara 39: Uchōtengai	July 5, 2017	Tokyo	Shinjuku Face	Trans-Am★Ryuichi vs. Fuma	
3	Basara 73: Hitoritenka	July 12, 2018	Tokyo	Shinjuku Face	Fuma vs. Ryota Nakatsu	
4	Basara 100: Tenka Issen	July 7, 2019	Tokyo	Ryogoku KFC Hall	Isami Kodaka vs. Minoru Fujita	
5	Clash! Dove × Basara 2020	July 26, 2020	Osaka	Azalea Taisho Hall	Naoki Tanizaki vs. Ryota Nakatsu	
6	Basara 163: Hoshiai no Sora	July 7, 2021	Tokyo	Shinjuku Face	Sagat vs. Minoru Fujita	
7	Basara 203: Kō	November 8, 2022	Tokyo	Shin-Kiba 1st Ring	Fuminori Abe vs. Yasu Urano	
8	Basara 223: Kō	June 27, 2023	Tokyo	Shin-Kiba 1st Ring	Sagat vs. Ryota Nakatsu	
9	Basara 279: Utage	May 23, 2025	Tokyo	Shin-Kiba 1st Ring	Keisuke Ishii vs. Ryota Nakatsu	

== Tournaments ==
Year	Winner	Won	Participants
2016	Hiroshi Fukuda	1	10
2017	Trans-Am★Ryuichi	1	12
2018	Ryota Nakatsu	1	16
2019	Isami Kodaka	1	16
2020	Ryota Nakatsu	2	16
2021	Minoru Fujita	1	16
2022	Fuminori Abe	1	16
2023	Sagat	1	16
2025	Ryota Nakatsu	3	16

== Results ==
=== 2016 ===
The 2016 Itadaki ran from May 1 to June 24. It featured ten participants divided into two blocks of five. After defeating Isami Kodaka in the final, Hiroshi Fukuda announced that he was changing his ring name to Trans-Am★Hiroshi, a name he still uses as of 2026.

Final standings
Block A		Block B	
Isami Kodaka	6	Hiroshi Fukuda	6
Ryota Nakatsu	4	Fuma	5
Ryuichi Sekine	4	Takumi Tsukamoto	5
Yusuke Kubo	4	Daichi Kazato	4
Sagat	2	Gouma Ryu	0

Block A	Kodaka	Sekine	Kubo	Sagat	Nakatsu
Kodaka	—N/a	Sekine (20:03)	Kodaka (14:37)	Kodaka (15:40)	Kodaka (16:51)
Sekine	Sekine (20:03)	—N/a	Kubo (13:34)	Sekine (8:46)	Nakatsu (17:20)
Kubo	Kodaka (14:37)	Kubo (13:34)	—N/a	Sagat (11:17)	Kubo (15:18)
Sagat	Kodaka (15:40)	Sekine (8:46)	Sagat (11:17)	—N/a	Nakatsu (11:58)
Nakatsu	Kodaka (16:51)	Nakatsu (17:20)	Kubo (15:18)	Nakatsu (11:58)	—N/a
Block B	Fuma	Tsukamoto	Kazato	Fukuda	Ryu
Fuma	—N/a	Double DQ (9:24)	Fuma (20:25)	Fukuda (17:19)	Fuma (7:04)
Tsukamoto	Double DQ (9:24)	—N/a	Kazato (10:24)	Tsukamoto (18:26)	Tsukamoto (8:05)
Kazato	Fuma (20:25)	Kazato (10:24)	—N/a	Fukuda (10:26)	Kazato (9:26)
Fukuda	Fukuda (17:19)	Tsukamoto (18:26)	Fukuda (10:26)	—N/a	Fukuda (7:08)
Ryu	Fuma (7:04)	Tsukamoto (8:05)	Kazato (9:26)	Fukuda (7:08)	—N/a

Finals
A1	Isami Kodaka	23:41
B1	Hiroshi Fukuda	Pin

=== 2017 ===
The 2017 Itadaki ran from May 4 to July 5. It featured twelve participants divided into two blocks of six. In Block B, a tiebreaker had to be held between Trans-Am★Hiroshi and Fuma, who were tied at 7 points as their head-to-head match ended in a double knockout. Fuma won the match, but lost to Trans-Am★Ryuichi in the final.

Final standings
Block A		Block B	
Trans-Am★Ryuichi	10	Trans-Am★Hiroshi	7
Ryuichi Sekine	8	Fuma	7
Yusuke Kubo	6	Isami Kodaka	6
Takumi Tsukamoto	4	Ryota Nakatsu	6
Best Stretchman V3	2	Sagat	4
Takato Nakano	0	Gouma Ryu	0

Block A	Ryuichi	Tsukamoto	Sekine	Kubo	Stretchman	Nakano
Ryuichi	—N/a	Ryuichi (12:52)	Ryuichi (11:04)	Ryuichi (10:17)	Ryuichi (11:28)	Ryuichi (6:05)
Tsukamoto	Ryuichi (12:52)	—N/a	Sekine (11:27)	Kubo (12:00)	Tsukamoto (7:04)	Tsukamoto (7:18)
Sekine	Ryuichi (11:04)	Sekine (11:27)	—N/a	Sekine (11:17)	Sekine (8:04)	Sekine (5:37)
Kubo	Ryuichi (10:17)	Kubo (12:00)	Sekine (11:17)	—N/a	Kubo (7:32)	Kubo (9:23)
Stretchman	Ryuichi (11:28)	Tsukamoto (7:04)	Sekine (8:04)	Kubo (7:32)	—N/a	Stretchman (6:05)
Nakano	Ryuichi (6:05)	Tsukamoto (7:18)	Sekine (5:37)	Kubo (9:23)	Stretchman (6:05)	—N/a
Block B	Hiroshi	Kodaka	Fuma	Nakatsu	Sagat	Ryu
Hiroshi	—N/a	Hiroshi (12:53)	Double KO (12:00)	Nakatsu (13:37)	Hiroshi (13:25)	Hiroshi (5:13)
Kodaka	Hiroshi (12:53)	—N/a	Kodaka (8:36)	Kodaka (13:43)	Sagat (12:39)	Kodaka (9:37)
Fuma	Double KO (12:00)	Kodaka (8:36)	—N/a	Fuma (12:59)	Fuma (10:27)	Fuma (8:59)
Nakatsu	Nakatsu (13:37)	Kodaka (13:43)	Fuma (12:59)	—N/a	Nakatsu (13:13)	Nakatsu (5:24)
Sagat	Hiroshi (13:25)	Sagat (12:39)	Fuma (10:27)	Nakatsu (13:13)	—N/a	Sagat (7:47)
Ryu	Hiroshi (5:13)	Kodaka (9:37)	Fuma (8:59)	Nakatsu (5:24)	Sagat (7:47)	—N/a

Block B Tiebreaker		Final (Note: This match was also for Trans-Am★Ryuichi's Union Max Championship.)
		A1	Trans-Am★Ryuichi	Pin
		B1	Fuma	17:19
Trans-Am★Hiroshi	13:27	B1	Fuma	17:19
Fuma	Pin

=== 2018 ===
The 2018 Itadaki was a 16-man single-elimination tournament, held between May 23 and July 12, with a third place playoff held in Osaka on July 22.

Round 1 May 23
Fuma	Pin
Daichi Kazato	9:44
Yusuke Kubo	5:37
Takumi Tsukamoto	Pin
Manabu Hara	Pin
Takato Nakano	5:17
Trans-Am★Hiroshi	Pin
Akiyori Takizawa	6:43
Isami Kodaka	13:13
Ryuichi Sekine	Sub
Ryota Nakatsu	Pin
Minoru Fujita	10:21
Gouma Ryu	3:48
Fuminori Abe	KO
Yasu Urano	Pin
Sagat	11:56

Round 2 June 10, 17
Fuma	Pin
Takumi Tsukamoto	12:52
Manabu Hara	11:24
Trans-Am★Hiroshi	Pin
Ryuichi Sekine	16:37
Ryota Nakatsu	Pin
Fuminori Abe	16:42
Yasu Urano	Sub

Semifinals; June 28
Fuma	Sub
Trans-Am★Hiroshi	15:26
Ryota Nakatsu	Pin
Yasu Urano	19:51

Final; July 12
Fuma	17:56
Ryota Nakatsu	Pin
Third place
Trans-Am★Hiroshi	14:49
Yasu Urano	Pin

=== 2019 ===
The 2019 Itadaki was held between May 29 and July 7. Among the participants, Tsutomu Oosugi was listed as being accompanied by Banana Senga as his second.

Round 1 May 29
Trans-Am★Hiroshi	5:30
Takato Nakano	Pin
Yusuke Kubo	9:20
Ryota Nakatsu	Pin
Daiki Shimomura	8:49
Isami Kodaka	Pin
Takumi Tsukamoto	2:52
Tsutomu Oosugi	Pin
Ryuichi Sekine	11:35
Sagat	Pin
Yasu Urano	Pin
Masato Kamino	9:52
Daichi Kazato	10:17
Fuma	Pin
Minoru Fujita	Sub
Fuminori Abe	10:30

Round 2 June 9, 16
Takato Nakano	11:45
Ryota Nakatsu	Sub
Isami Kodaka	Pin
Tsutomu Oosugi	20:15
Sagat	Pin
Yasu Urano	12:53
Fuma	11:53
Minoru Fujita	Pin

Semifinals; June 25
Ryota Nakatsu	12:14
Isami Kodaka	Pin
Sagat	14:27
Minoru Fujita	Pin

Final; July 7
Isami Kodaka	Pin
Minoru Fujita	18:59

=== 2020 ===
The 2020 Itadaki took place between July 19 and 26. It was the first Itadaki to be held after Pro-Wrestling Basara split from DDT Pro-Wrestling, and was co-produced with the Hiroshima-based Dove Pro Wrestling promotion. Dove had held two editions of the Chōten (頂天) tournament in 2013–14 and 2016, so the 2020 edition served as both Basara's fifth Itadaki tournament and Dove's third Chōten tournament. The first two rounds were held in two separate events on July 19, one in the early afternoon and one in the evening, with round one taking up the entire card of the afternoon event. All round one matches pitted a Basara wrestler against a Dove wrestler. Matches up to the semifinals were also limited to twenty minutes, and the finals were limited to sixty minutes.

Round 1 July 19
Fuminori Abe	Pin
"brother" Yasshi	4:34
Takumi Tsukamoto	Pin
Gunso	10:11
Daiki Shimomura	Pin
Shoichi Uchida	10:16
Ryuichi Sekine	15:28
Naoki Tanizaki	Sub
Ryota Nakatsu	Pin
Rey Paloma	8:05
Sagat	7:33
Kohei Kinoshita	Sub
Fuma	Pin
Kabuki Kid	7:14
Isami Kodaka	13:22
Kenshin Chikano	Pin

Round 2 July 19
Fuminori Abe	11:14
Takumi Tsukamoto	Pin
Daiki Shimomura	14:18
Naoki Tanizaki	Pin
Ryota Nakatsu	Pin
Kohei Kinoshita	9:40
Fuma	12:57
Kenshin Chikano	Pin

Semifinals; July 26
Takumi Tsukamoto	8:24
Naoki Tanizaki	Sub
Ryota Nakatsu	Pin
Kenshin Chikano	7:12

Final; July 26
Naoki Tanizaki	16:36
Ryota Nakatsu	Pin

=== 2021 ===
The 2021 Itadaki took place between May 18 and July 7. Basara invited non-Basara wrestlers to participate, including Takuya Nomura from Big Japan Pro Wrestling (BJW) and Akiyori Takizawa from TTT Pro-Wrestling. However, Takizawa had to withdraw due to injury and he was replaced by Kosuke Sato from BJW. The first round matches were fought with a 10-minute time limit, and with two count pinfalls instead of the regular three count. In the first round, Fuminori Abe and Takuya Nomura fought to a time limit draw, eliminating both of them from the tournament and giving Yasu Urano a bye into the semifinals.

Round 1 May 18
Minoru Fujita	Pin
Masato Kamino	8:35
Ryota Nakatsu	Pin
Daiki Shimomura	7:10
Yasu Urano	Pin
Daichi Kazato	8:45
Fuminori Abe	Draw
Takuya Nomura	10:00
Takumi Tsukamoto	6:42
Trans-Am★Hiroshi	Sub
Takato Nakano	4:18
Sagat	Pin
Fuma	Sub
Kosuke Sato	7:13
Isami Kodaka	Sub
Yusuke Kubo	9:35

Round 2 June 5
Minoru Fujita	Pin
Daiki Shimomura	20:58
Trans-Am★Hiroshi	12:47
Sagat	Pin
Fuma	Sub
Isami Kodaka	17:10

Semifinals; June 29
Minoru Fujita	Pin
Yasu Urano	18:20
Sagat	Pin
Fuma	18:57

Final; July 7
Minoru Fujita	Pin
Sagat	20:17

=== 2022 ===
The 2022 Itadaki took place between October 11 and November 8.

Round 1 October 11	Round 2 October 22
Fuma	Pin
Daiki Shimomura	8:14
Fuma	Sub
Trans-Am★Hiroshi	11:59
Minoru Fujita	7:58
Trans-Am★Hiroshi	Sub
Block A
Tsutomu Oosugi	Pin
Lil Kraken	6:23
Tsutomu Oosugi	12:17
Fuminori Abe	Pin
Fuminori Abe	Sub
Daichi Kazato	5:36
Takumi Tsukamoto	8:38
Masato Kamino	Pin
Masato Kamino	Pin
Takato Nakano	11:34
Takato Nakano	Pin
Sagat	1:03
Block B
Isami Kodaka	Pin
Banana Senga	4:24
Isami Kodaka	14:05
Yasu Urano	Pin
Ryota Nakatsu	8:42
Yasu Urano	Pin

Semifinals; November 8
Fuma	11:20
Fuminori Abe	Sub
Masato Kamino	13:16
Yasu Urano	Sub

Final; November 8
Fuminori Abe	Sub
Yasu Urano	23:32

=== 2023 ===
The 2023 Itadaki took place between May 23 and June 27. This year's edition saw a return to regular rules for all matches, with a 30-minute time limit. The first round between Trans-Am★Hiroshi and Leo Isaka ended in a double countout draw, eliminating both from the tournament and giving Sagat a bye into the semifinals.

Round 1 May 23, June 3	Round 2 June 3, 17
Isami Kodaka	Sub
Shiori Asahi	16:14
Isami Kodaka	20:47
Daiki Shimomura	Pin
Daichi Kazato	13:37
Daiki Shimomura	Pin
Block A
Trans-Am★Hiroshi	DCO
Leo Isaka	9:00
Sagat	Pin
Lil Kraken	11:08
Takumi Tsukamoto	Sub
Yasu Urano	14:32
Takumi Tsukamoto	13:36
Fuminori Abe	Sub
Fuma	11:26
Fuminori Abe	Pin
Block B
Ryota Nakatsu	Sub
Tatsuhiko Yoshino	9:53
Ryota Nakatsu	Pin
Minoru Fujita	12:30
Masato Kamino	11:30
Minoru Fujita	Pin

Semifinals; June 27k
Daiki Shimomura	11:11
Sagat	Sub
Fuminori Abe	9:10
Ryota Nakatsu	Pin

Final; June 27
Sagat	Pin
Ryota Nakatsu	17:57

=== 2025 ===
After a hiatus in 2024, the 2025 Itadaki took place between April 30 and May 23. First round matches were once again contested to a 10-minute time limit and with two-count pinfalls. A draw would no longer result in a double elimination, but rather a one-count pinfall sudden death. Guest participants included Keisuke Ishii from Ganbare☆Pro-Wrestling, Ayumu Honda from Active Advance Pro Wrestling, and Tomoki Hatano from Pro-Wrestling Heat-Up. Kubito was originally scheduled to participate in the tournament, but had to withdraw due to health issues; he was replaced by Minoru Fujita.

Round 1 April 30	Round 2 May 14
Takumi Tsukamoto	Pin
Lil Kraken	5:12
Takumi Tsukamoto	Pin
Daichi Kazato	11:55
Daichi Kazato	Pin
Takato Nakano	3:41
Block A
Isami Kodaka	Pin
Masato Kamino	3:48
Isami Kodaka	13:38
Keisuke Ishii	Pin
Ryuichi Sekine	6:43
Keisuke Ishii	Pin
Daiki Shimomura	Pin
Trans-Am★Hiroshi	2:54
Daiki Shimomura	Pin
Tomoki Hatano	11:55
Tomoki Hatano	Pin (Note: This match went into sudden death due to a time limit draw.)
Sagat	11:11
Block B
Ryota Nakatsu	Pin (Note: This match went into sudden death due to a double pinfall draw.)
Minoru Fujita	5:07
Ryota Nakatsu	Pin
Fuma	12:50
Fuma	Sub
Ayumu Honda	11:21

Semifinals; May 23
Takumi Tsukamoto	7:01
Keisuke Ishii	Pin
Daiki Shimomura	5:37
Ryota Nakatsu	Pin

Final; May 23
Keisuke Ishii	15:44
Ryota Nakatsu	Pin

== See also ==
- Pro-Wrestling Basara
- DDT Pro-Wrestling
- Annual elimination tournaments in Japan:
  - New Japan Cup
  - Ōdō Tournament
  - King of DDT Tournament
  - Ryūkon Cup
