= Kosuke Sato (wrestler) =

Japanese professional wrestler

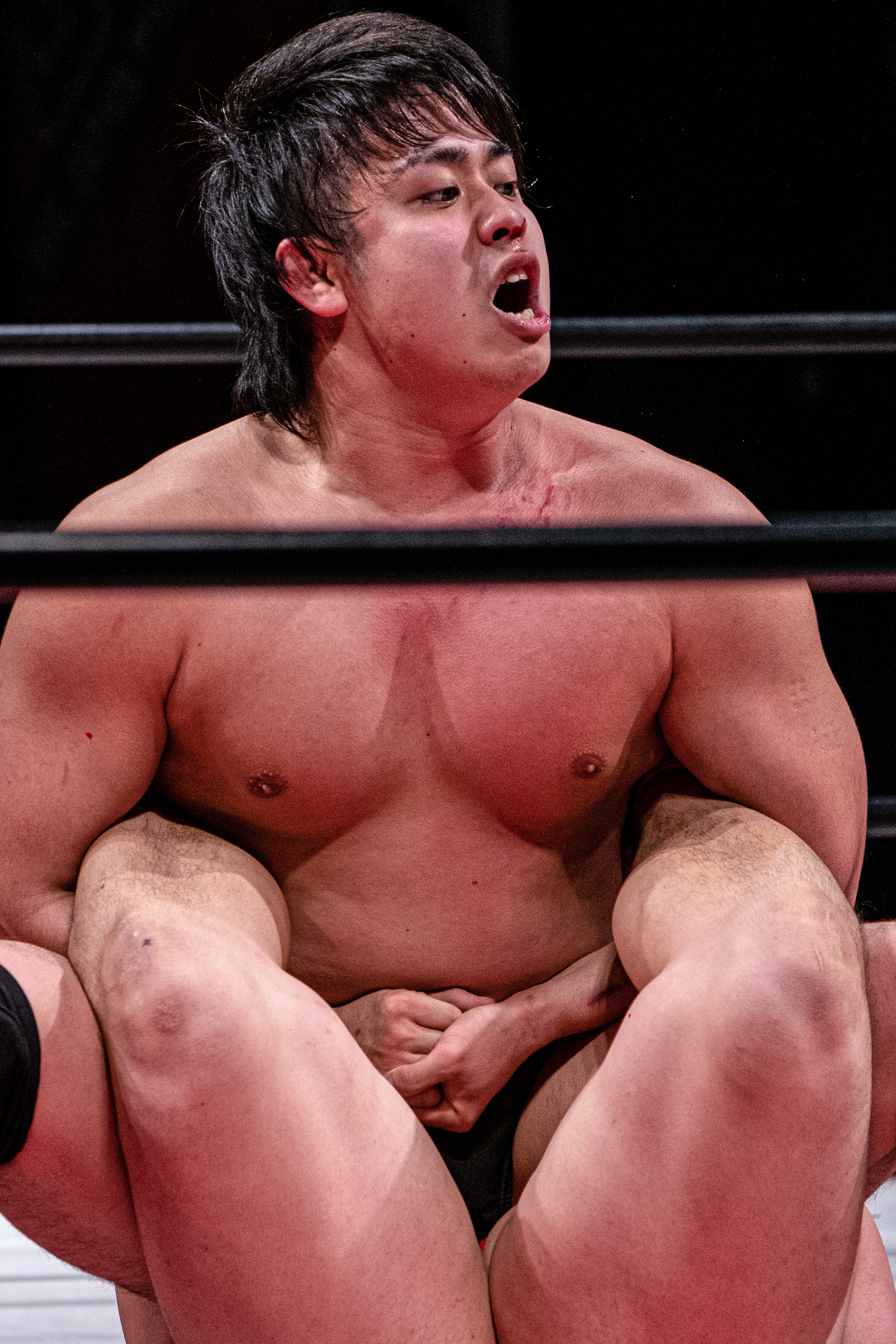
- Sato in January 2020

Personal information
- Born: 2 March 1996 (age 30) Saitama, Japan

Professional wrestling career
- Ring name: Kosuke Sato
- Billed height: 170 cm (5 ft 7 in)
- Billed weight: 80 kg (176 lb)
- Trained by: Animal Hamaguchi Dojo
- Debut: 2019

Kosuke Sato (佐藤孝亮, Satō Kōsuke) is a Japanese professional wrestler signed to Big Japan Pro Wrestling (BJW). Since May 2025, he also former one-time BJW Junior Heavyweight Champion. He is also known for his work with various independent promotions including Pro Wrestling Zero1 and Active Advance Pro Wrestling (2AW).

== Professional wrestling career ==
=== Big Japan Pro Wrestling (2019–present) ===
Sato made his professional wrestling debut in Big Japan Pro Wrestling on February 8, 2019, the seventh night of the BJW Dai Nippon Pro-Wrestling Ueno Convention. He wrestled Kazumi Kikuta into a time-limit draw in an exhibition bout.

At BJW Yokohama Thanks Day 2024 on December 2, Sato teamed up with Hideyoshi Kamitani and Yuya Aoki to unsuccessfully challenge Daisuke Sekimoto, Kazumi Kikuta and Yasufumi Nakanoue for the Yokohama Shopping Street 6-Man Tag Team Championship. At BJW 30th Anniversary ~ Dainichi Spirit on May 5, 2025, he defeated Iku to Hidaka to win the BJW Junior Heavyweight Championship. The event marked the first title win of Sato's career.

Sato competed in several of the promotion's signature events. In 2022, he made his first appearance in the Akinosun Strong Climb. Competing in the B block, he failed to score any points against Daisuke Sekimoto, Daichi Hashimoto, Kazumi Kikuta, Yuya Aoki, and Kazuki Hashimoto.

=== Japanese independent circuit (2019–present) ===
Sato often competes in Pro Wrestling Zero1 as a BJW talent. At BJW Big Sky Blue on November 20, 2021, he unsuccessfully challenged Fuminori Abe for both the Zero1 World Junior Heavyweight Championship and Zero1 International Junior Heavyweight Championship. He competed in the 2022 Chono Camp tournament in which he scored a total of ten points after competing in the A block against Takumi Baba, Akira Jumonji and Shoki Kitamura.

Sato competed in the 2021 edition of Pro-Wrestling Basara's Itagakis tournament, in which he lost to Fuma in the first round. At Kabuto Thanetian III: One Life to Live, an independent show on April 8, 2025, he lost to Masashi Takeda in singles competition.

== Championships and accomplishments ==
- Big Japan Pro Wrestling
  - BJW Junior Heavyweight Championship (1 time)
- Pro Wrestling Illustrated
  - Ranked No. 265 of the top 500 singles wrestlers in the PWI 500 in 2026
