= Kohei Kinoshita =

Japanese professional wrestler

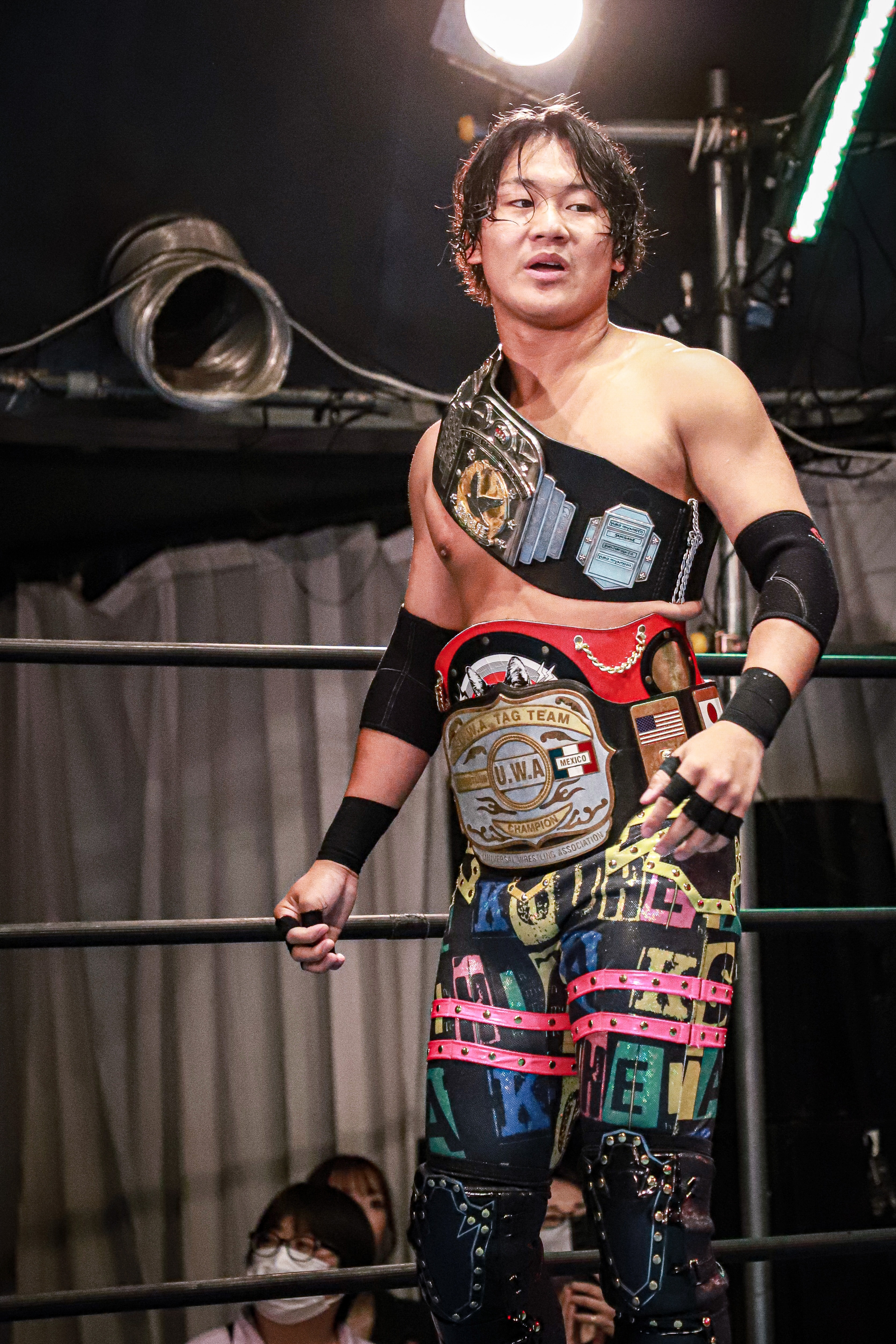
- Kinoshita in July 2023

Personal information
- Born: 15 July 1997 (age 29) Izumi, Japan

Professional wrestling career
- Ring name: Yukkina Kinoshita Kohei Kinoshita
- Billed height: 172 cm (5 ft 8 in)
- Billed weight: 70 kg (154 lb)
- Debut: 2016

Kohei Kinoshita (木下亨平, Kinoshita Kohei) is a Japanese professional wrestler currently working as a freelancer and is best known for his tenures with Wrestling of Darkness 666 and Dove Pro Wrestling.

== Professional wrestling career ==
=== Dove Pro Wrestling (2016–present) ===
Kinoshita made his professional wrestling debut in Dove Pro Wrestling at Dove Pro Bump Bump Revolution 12 ~ The Last Stand Of Sakigake on 25 December 2016, where he teamed up with Souther in a losing effort against Shoichi Uchida and Tsuyoshi Okada in tag team competition. During his tenure with the promotion, Kinoshita has won the Dove Pro Heavyweight Championship, the promotion's top title on one separate occasion. At Dove Pro Natsugira 2024 Osaka on 23 August, Kinoshita teamed up with "Real Hipstar" stablemate Jun Masaoka to unsuccessfully challenge Gunso and Yusaku Ito for the Dove Pro Tag Team Championship.

=== DDT Pro-Wrestling (2017–present) ===
Kinoshita made his debut in DDT Pro-Wrestling at Dove Pro/BASARA Clash!, a cross-over event held between then-time underbrand Pro-Wrestling Basara of DDT and his native promotion Dove Pro on 10 August 2017, where he teamed up with Yuki (Mataro) Aoki in a losing effort against Kubota Brothers (Hide Kubota and Yasu Kubota).

In pay-per-view events, Kinoshita made his first appearance at DDT Beer Garden Fight 2018 on 5 August, where he teamed up with Kenshin Chikano, Yasshi and Yuki Aoki in a losing effort against Iron Priest (Fuma and Yusuke Kubo), Takato Nakano and Takumi Tsukamoto.

At DDT Osaka vs. Tokyo - Dream East West Pro Wrestling Battle on 10 August 2024, Kinoshita unsuccessfully challenged Shunma Katsumata for the DDT Extreme Championship.

=== Total Triumph Team (2020–present) ===
Another promotion in which Kinoshita has activated is Guts Ishijima's Total Triumph Team (TTT). During his time with it, Kinoshita has won the TTT Indie Unified Six Man Tag Team Championship on one separate occasion alongside Jun Masaoka and Mataro Aoki, the TTT Indie Unified Tag Team Championship once alongside Masaoka, and the CCW Canadian Heavyweight Championship, an independent title shared by various Japanese promotions over time. Kinoshita alongside Jun Masaoka and Mataro Aoki were the final holders of the GWC 6-Man Tag Team Championship. They vacated the titles after their second defense against Akiyori Takizawa, Ryota Nakatsu and Sagat in that respective reign. The title was then replaced the following month with the TTT Indie Unified 6-Man Tag Team Championship.

=== Big Japan Pro Wrestling (2022–present) ===
At BJW Osaka Surprise 64 ~ Glory Members 2023 on 11 February, Kinoshita and Yasshi teamed up to defeat Eisa8 and Hub for the UWA World Tag Team Championship. They held the titles until BJW Osaka Surprise 70 on 24 December 2023, when they dropped them to Speed Of Sounds (Banana Senga and Tsutomu Oosugi).

Kinoshita competed at ZERO1 ZERO1 Vs. Osaka-Gun ~ Spring Sakura Great Battle, an event promoted by Pro Wrestling Zero1 as a developmental talent sent by BJW where he teamed up with "Real Hipstar" teammate Jun Masaoka to unsuccessfully challenge Kubota Brothers (Hide Kubota and Yasu Kubota) for the NWA Intercontinental Tag Team Championship.

==== European independent circuit (2023) ====
Kinoshita went into a foreign excursion in Europe, mainly competing in the German promotion Westside Xtreme Wrestling (wXw) as a BJW-sent talent. At wXw We Love Wrestling - Live in Bad Säckingen on 4 November 2023, he teamed up with Shigehiro Irie to unsuccessfully challenge Dennis Dullnig and Hektor Invictus for the wXw World Tag Team Championship. At Heat In Der wXw Wrestling Academy on 15 November 2023, Kinoshita unsuccessfully challenged Danny Fray for the wXw Academy Championship.

== Championships and accomplishments ==
- Big Japan Pro Wrestling
  - UWA World Tag Team Championship (1 time) – Yasshi
- Dotonbori Pro Wrestling
  - WDW Six Man Tag Team Championship (1 time) – with Naoki Tanizaki and Shoichi Uchida
- Dove Pro Wrestling
  - Dove Pro Heavyweight Championship (1 time)
- Pro Wrestling Illustrated
  - Ranked No. 472 of the top 500 singles wrestlers in the PWI 500 of 2023
- Total Triumph Team Pro-Wrestling
  - CCW Canadian Heavyweight Championship (1 time)
  - TTT Indie Unified Tag Team Championship (1 time) – with Jun Masaoka
  - TTT Indie Unified Six Man Tag Team Championship (1 time) – with Jun Masaoka and Gaia Hox
  - GWC 6-Man Tag Team Championship (1 time, final) – with Jun Masaoka and Mataro Aoki
- Wrestling of Darkness 666
  - 666 Locomotive Class Championship (3 times, current) – with Yasshi (2) and Gaia Hox (1)
