= GWC 6-Man Tag Team Championship =

Professional wrestling trios tag team championship

- One of the GWC 6-Man Tag Team Championship belts

Details
- Promotion: Guts World (2006–2018); GanPro (2019–2021); TTT (2021–2022)
- Date established: 2006
- Date retired: May 21, 2022
Statistics
- First champions: Gami, Guts Ishijima and Minami
- Final champions: Jun Masaoka, Kohei Kinoshita and Mataro Aoki
- Most reigns: Devil Michio CHAN (Chango, Guts Ishijima and Michio Kageyama) and Ganpochi-gun (Ken Ohka, Yumehito Imanari and Miss Mongol) (2 reigns)
- Longest reign: Amigo Suzuki, Chango and Guts Ishijima (539 days)
- Shortest reign: Masashi Takeda, Masato Shibata and Kotaru Nasu (<1 day)

The GWC 6-Man Tag Team Championship (Japanese: GWC認定6人タッグ王座, Hepburn: GWC-nintei Roku-nin Taggu Ōza) was a six-person tag team title established in 2006 by the Japanese professional wrestling promotion Guts World Pro-Wrestling. After the promotion folded in 2018, the titles moved to Ganbare☆Pro-Wrestling, a sub-brand of DDT Pro-Wrestling. In June 2021, the title went to Total Triumph Team Pro-Wrestling when Guts Ishijima became a nine-time champion.

On May 21, 2022, the title was deactivated to be replaced with the TTT Indie Unified 6-Man Tag Team Championship.

Like most professional wrestling championships, the title was won as a result of a scripted match. There had been thirty reigns shared among fifty-one wrestlers and twenty-seven teams. Jun Masaoka, Kohei Kinoshita and Mataro Aoki were the last title holders.

== History ==
Key
| No. | Overall reign number |
| Reign | Reign number for the specific team—reign numbers for the individuals are in parentheses, if different |
| Days | Number of days held |
| Defenses | Number of successful defenses |
| <1 | Reign lasted less than a day |

| No. | Champion | Championship change | | | Reign statistics | | | Notes | Ref. |
| No. | Champion | Date | Event | Location | Reign | Days | Defenses | Notes | Ref. |
|---|---|---|---|---|---|---|---|---|---|
Guts World Pro-Wrestling
| 1 | Gami, Guts Ishijima and Minami | September 9, 2006 | Guts World Vol. 13 | Tokyo, Japan | 1 | 133 | 0 | Defeated Bachiko, Daisuke and Leonard Takatsu in a tournament final to become the first champions. | |
| 2 | Team Rocken (Daisuke, Shoichi Ichimiya and Yuri Urai) | January 20, 2007 | Guts World Vol. 16 | Tokyo, Japan | 1 | 101 | 0 | | |
| — | Vacated | May 1, 2007 | — | — | — | — | — | | |
| 3 | Mr. Gannosuke, Suzki, and Yuji Kito | June 2, 2007 | Guts World Vol. 19: Victory Is All 2007 | Tokyo, Japan | 1 | 141 | 1 | Defeated Daisuke, Guts Ishijima and Masked Mystery to win the vacant championship. | |
| 4 | Dick Togo, Ryan Upin and Yuki Sato | October 21, 2007 | Guts World Vol. 22: Autumn Impact 2007 | Tokyo, Japan | 1 | 181 | 0 | | |
| 5 | Metabo Army (Guts Ishijima, Leonard Takatsu and Masked Mystery) | April 19, 2008 | Guts World Vol. 26 | Tokyo, Japan | 1 (2, 1, 1) | 347 | 2 | | |
| — | Vacated | April 1, 2009 | — | — | — | — | — | | |
| 6 | Bungee Takada, Guts Ishijima and Tatsuhiko Yoshino | May 3, 2009 | Guts World Vol. 33 | Tokyo, Japan | 1 (1, 3, 1) | 154 | 1 | Defeated Devil Invader, Masked Mystery and Ryan Upin to win the vacant championship. | |
| 7 | Devil Invader, Kakugari Umibozu and Ryan Upin | October 4, 2009 | Guts World Vol. 36 | Tokyo, Japan | 1 (1, 2, 2) | 58 | 0 | Umibozu previously held the title under the name Leonard Takatsu. | |
| — | Vacated | December 1, 2009 | — | — | — | — | — | | |
| 8 | Bungee Takada, Daisuke and Masashi Takeda | December 5, 2009 | Guts World Vol. 37: 5th Anniversary Show | Tokyo, Japan | 1 (2, 2, 1) | 71 | 0 | Defeated Devil Invader, Guts Ishijima and Kakugari Umibozu to win the vacant championship. | |
| 9 | Devil World (Devil Invader, Guts Ishijima and Toshihiro Sueyoshi) | February 14, 2010 | Guts World in Warabi 3rd | Warabi, Japan | 1 (2, 4, 1) | 161 | 0 | | |
| 10 | Daisuke, Kankuro Hoshino and Masashi Takeda | July 25, 2010 | Guts World in Warabi 4th | Warabi, Japan | 1 (3, 1, 2) | 280 | 0 | | |
| — | Vacated | May 1, 2011 | — | — | — | — | — | | |
| 11 | Style-E (Masashi Takeda, Masato Shibata and Kotaru Nasu) | May 29, 2011 | Guts World Vol. 46 | Chōfu, Japan | 1 (3, 1, 1) | <1 | 0 | Defeated Daisuke, Ryan Upin and Kankuro Hoshino in a tournament final to win the vacant championship. | |
| 12 | Amigo Suzuki, Chango and Guts Ishijima | May 29, 2011 | Guts World Vol. 46 | Chōfu, Japan | 1 (1, 1, 5) | 539 | 3 | Suzuki, Chango and Ishijima redeemed their Right To Challenge Anytime, Anywhere contract immediately after the tournament final. | |
| 13 | Daisuke, Taro Yamada and Tatsuhiko Yoshino | November 18, 2012 | Guts World Vol. 58 | Yokohama, Japan | 1 (4, 1, 2) | 111 | 1 | | |
| 14 | Alps Industry (Kenichiro Arai, Masked Mystery and Ryan Upin) | March 9, 2013 | Guts World Vol. 61 | Chōfu, Japan | 1 (1, 2, 3) | 273 | 1 | | |
| 15 | Daisuke, Guts Ishijima and Tatsuhiko Yoshino | December 7, 2013 | Guts World Vol. 68 | Tokyo, Japan | 1 (5, 6, 3) | 84 | 0 | | |
| — | Deactivated | March 1, 2014 | — | — | — | — | — | Championship abandoned then reactivated on July 19, 2016 for a tournament. | |
| 16 | Tonpachi Machine Guns (Masao Orihara, Amigo Suzuki and Ryan Upin) | August 16, 2016 | Guts World Vol. 99: Bukotsu Taisen Special 2016 | Tokyo, Japan | 1 (1, 2, 4) | 26 | 0 | Defeated Daisuke, Koji Iwamoto and Joji Otani in a tournament final to win the vacant championship. | |
| 17 | Devil Michio CHAN (Chango, Guts Ishijima and Michio Kageyama) | September 11, 2016 | Guts World Vol. 100: Winning Guts 2016 | Tokyo, Japan | 1 (2, 7, 1) | 65 | 0 | | |
| 18 | Tonpachi Machine Guns with FEC (Dick Togo, Ryan Upin and Masao Orihara) | November 15, 2016 | Guts World Vol. 102: Champion of G 2016 | Tokyo, Japan | 1 (2, 5, 2) | 336 | 4 | | |
| 19 | Devil Michio CHAN (Chango, Guts Ishijima and Michio Kageyama) | October 17, 2017 | Guts World Vol. 112: GUTS Ism 2017 | Tokyo, Japan | 2 (3, 8, 2) | 180 | 0 | | |
| — | Deactivated | April 15, 2018 | — | — | — | — | — | Championship deactivated when Guts World Pro-Wrestling folded. | |
Ganbare☆Pro-Wrestling (GanPro)
| 20 | Ken Ohka, Yumehito Imanari and Miss Mongol | July 17, 2019 | Last Dance Is For Me 2019 | Tokyo, Japan | 1 | 25 | 0 | Defeated Guts Ishijima, Masked Mystery and Shota to reactivate the championship. | |
| 21 | Hattoshite Good Alps Industry (Kenichiro Arai, Masked Mystery and Shota) | August 11, 2019 | Monster Green 2019 | Tokyo, Japan | 1 (2, 3, 1) | 133 | 0 | | |
| 22 | Ganpocha-gun (Ken Ohka, Yumehito Imanari and Miss Mongol) | December 22, 2019 | White Breath 2019 | Tokyo, Japan | 2 | 265 | 1 | | |
| 23 | The Halfee (Katsuzaki Shunosuke, Moehiko Harumisawa and Shu Sakurai) | September 12, 2020 | Honjitsu Wa Seinen Nari 2020 | Tokyo, Japan | 1 | 148 | 2 | | |
| 24 | Dreams Haru True (Keisuke Ishii, Kouki Iwasaki and Harukaze) | February 7, 2021 | Over The Top 2021 | Tokyo, Japan | 1 | 14 | 0 | | |
| 25 | Asuka, Hagane Shinno and Shinichiro Tominaga | February 21, 2021 | Cliffhanger 2021 | Tokyo, Japan | 1 | 97 | 2 | | |
| 26 | The Halfee (Katsuzaki Shunosuke, Moehiko Harumisawa and Shu Sakurai) | May 29, 2021 | True Romance 2021 | Tokyo, Japan | 2 | 15 | 0 | | |
Total Triumph Team Pro-Wrestling (TTT)
| 27 | Guts of Sounds (Guts Ishijima, Tsutomu Oosugi and Banana Senga) | June 13, 2021 | Big Match 2021 | Tokyo, Japan | 1 (9, 1, 1) | 111 | 1 | | |
| 28 | Wataridori Rengō (Shuuoh Fujiwara, Masashi Takeda and Taisuke Kimura) | October 2, 2021 | Attack 9 | Tokyo, Japan | 1 (1, 4, 1) | 98 | 1 | | |
| — | Vacated | January 8, 2022 | — | — | — | — | — | Vacated because Masashi Takeda was unable to defend the title due to family reasons. | |
| 29 | Rojiura no Shōnentachi (Toru, Akiyori Takizawa and Tetsuya Goto) | January 8, 2022 | TTT 2nd Anniversary | Tokyo, Japan | 1 | 63 | 0 | | |
| 30 | Jun Masaoka, Kohei Kinoshita and Mataro Aoki | March 12, 2022 | Innovation 2 | Tokyo, Japan | 1 | 70 | 2 | | |
| — | Deactivated | May 21, 2022 | Innovation 4 | Tokyo, Japan | — | — | — | Vacated after the champions' second defense against Akiyori Takizawa, Ryota Nakatsu and Sagat. The title was then replaced the following month with the TTT Indie Unified 6-Man Tag Team Championship. | |

== Combined reigns ==
=== By team ===
| Rank | Team | No. of reigns | Combined defenses | Combined days |
|---|---|---|---|---|
| 1 | Amigo Suzuki, Chango and Guts Ishijima | 1 | 3 | 539 |
| 2 | Metabo Army (Guts Ishijima, Leonard Takatsu and Masked Mystery) | 1 | 2 | 347 |
| 3 | Tonpachi Machine Guns with FEC (Dick Togo, Ryan Upin and Masao Orihara) | 1 | 4 | 336 |
| 4 | Ganpocha-gun (Ken Ohka, Yumehito Imanari and Miss Mongol) | 2 | 1 | 290 |
| 5 | Daisuke, Kankuro Hoshino and Masashi Takeda | 1 | 0 | 280 |
| 6 | Alps Industry (Kenichiro Arai, Masked Mystery and Ryan Upin) | 1 | 1 | 273 |
| 7 | Devil Michio CHAN (Chango, Guts Ishijima and Michio Kageyama) | 2 | 0 | 245 |
| 8 | Dick Togo, Ryan Upin and Yuki Sato | 1 | 0 | 181 |
| 9 | The Halfee (Katsuzaki Shunosuke, Moehiko Harumisawa and Shu Sakurai) | 2 | 2 | 163 |
| 10 | Devil World (Devil Invader, Guts Ishijima and Toshihiro Sueyoshi) | 1 | 0 | 161 |
| 11 | Bungee Takada, Guts Ishijima and Tatsuhiko Yoshino | 1 | 1 | 154 |
| 12 | Mr. Gannosuke, Suzki, and Yuji Kito | 1 | 1 | 141 |
| 13 | Gami, Guts Ishijima and Minami | 1 | 0 | 133 |
| 13 | Hattoshite Good Alps Industry (Kenichiro Arai, Masked Mystery and Shota) | 1 | 0 | 133 |
| 15 | Guts of Sounds (Guts Ishijima, Tsutomu Oosugi and Banana Senga) | 1 | 1 | 111 |
| 15 | Daisuke, Taro Yamada and Tatsuhiko Yoshino | 1 | 1 | 111 |
| 17 | Team Rocken (Daisuke, Shoichi Ichimiya and Yuri Urai) | 1 | 0 | 101 |
| 18 | Wataridori Rengō (Shuuoh Fujiwara, Masashi Takeda and Taisuke Kimura) | 1 | 1 | 98 |
| 19 | Asuka, Hagane Shinno and Shinichiro Tominaga | 1 | 2 | 97 |
| 20 | Daisuke, Guts Ishijima and Tatsuhiko Yoshino | 1 | 0 | 84 |
| 21 | Bungee Takada, Daisuke and Masashi Takeda | 1 | 0 | 71 |
| 22 | Jun Masaoka, Kohei Kinoshita and Mataro Aoki | 1 | 2 | 70 |
| 23 | Rojiura no Shōnentachi (Toru, Akiyori Takizawa and Tetsuya Goto) | 1 | 0 | 63 |
| 24 | Devil Invader, Kakugari Umibozu and Ryan Upin | 1 | 0 | 58 |
| 25 | Tonpachi Machine Guns (Masao Orihara, Amigo Suzuki and Ryan Upin) | 1 | 0 | 26 |
| 26 | Dreams Haru True (Keisuke Ishii, Kouki Iwasaki and Harukaze) | 1 | 0 | 14 |
| 27 | Style-E (Masashi Takeda, Masato Shibata and Kotaru Nasu) | 1 | 0 | <1 |

=== By wrestler ===
| Rank | Team | No. of reigns | Combined defenses | Combined days |
|---|---|---|---|---|
| 1 | Guts Ishijima | 9 | 7 | 1,774 |
| 2 | Ryan Upin | 5 | 5 | 874 |
| 3 | Chango | 3 | 3 | 784 |
| 4 | Masked Mystery | 3 | 3 | 753 |
| 5 | Daisuke | 5 | 1 | 647 |
| 6 | Amigo Suzuki | 2 | 3 | 565 |
| 7 | Dick Togo | 2 | 4 | 517 |
| 8 | Masashi Takeda | 4 | 1 | 449 |
| 9 | Kenichiro Arai | 2 | 1 | 406 |
| 10 | Leonard Takatsu/Kakugari Umibozu | 2 | 2 | 405 |
| 11 | Masao Orihara | 2 | 4 | 362 |
| 12 | Tatsuhiko Yoshino | 3 | 2 | 349 |
| 13 | Ken Ohka | 2 | 1 | 290 |
| 13 | Miss Mongol | 2 | 1 | 290 |
| 13 | Yumehito Imanari | 2 | 1 | 290 |
| 16 | Kankuro Hoshino | 1 | 0 | 280 |
| 17 | Michio Kageyama | 2 | 0 | 245 |
| 18 | Bungee Takada | 2 | 1 | 225 |
| 19 | Devil Invader | 2 | 0 | 219 |
| 20 | Yuki Sato | 1 | 0 | 181 |
| 21 | Katsuzaki Shunosuke | 2 | 2 | 163 |
| 21 | Moehiko Harumisawa | 2 | 2 | 163 |
| 21 | Shu Sakurai | 2 | 2 | 163 |
| 24 | Toshihiro Sueyoshi | 1 | 0 | 161 |
| 25 | Mr. Gannosuke | 1 | 1 | 141 |
| 25 | Suzki | 1 | 1 | 141 |
| 25 | Yuji Kito | 1 | 1 | 141 |
| 28 | Gami | 1 | 0 | 133 |
| 28 | Minami | 1 | 0 | 133 |
| 28 | Shota | 1 | 0 | 133 |
| 31 | Banana Senga | 1 | 1 | 111 |
| 31 | Tsutomu Oosugi | 1 | 1 | 111 |
| 31 | Taro Yamada | 1 | 1 | 111 |
| 34 | Shoichi Ichimiya | 1 | 0 | 101 |
| 34 | Yuri Urai | 1 | 0 | 101 |
| 36 | Shuuoh Fujiwara | 1 | 1 | 98 |
| 36 | Taisuke Kimura | 1 | 1 | 98 |
| 38 | Asuka | 1 | 2 | 97 |
| 38 | Hagane Shinno | 1 | 2 | 97 |
| 38 | Shinichiro Tominaga | 1 | 2 | 97 |
| 41 | Jun Masaoka | 1 | 2 | 70 |
| 41 | Kohei Kinoshita | 1 | 2 | 70 |
| 41 | Mataro Aoki | 1 | 2 | 70 |
| 44 | Akiyori Takizawa | 1 | 0 | 63 |
| 44 | Tetsuya Goto | 1 | 0 | 63 |
| 44 | Toru | 1 | 0 | 63 |
| 47 | Harukaze | 1 | 0 | 14 |
| 47 | Keisuke Ishii | 1 | 0 | 14 |
| 47 | Kouki Iwasaki | 1 | 0 | 14 |
| 50 | Kotaro Nasu | 1 | 0 | <1 |
| 50 | Masato Shibata | 1 | 0 | <1 |

== See also ==
- KO-D 6-Man Tag Team Championship
- UWA World Trios Championship
