= Fuminori Abe =

Japanese professional wrestler

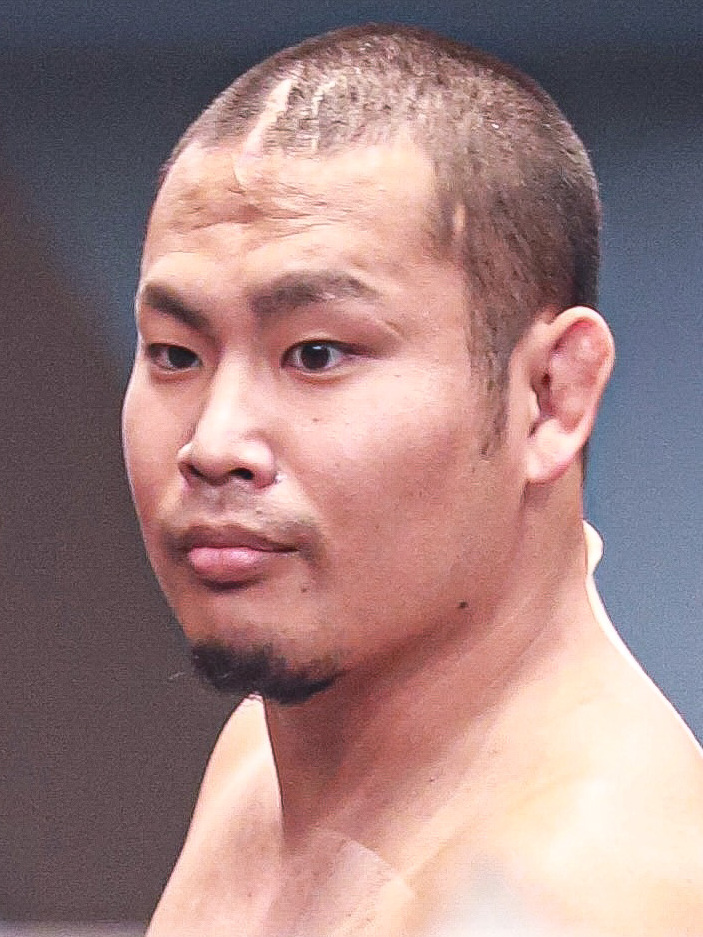
- Abe in July 2023

Personal information
- Born: January 4, 1995 (age 31) Tokyo, Japan

Professional wrestling career
- Ring name(s): Rihei; Taido Abe; Fuminori Abe
- Billed height: 173 cm (5 ft 8 in)
- Billed weight: 78 kg (172 lb)
- Trained by: Munenori Sawa
- Debut: 2015

Fuminori Abe (阿部史典, Abe Fuminori) is a Japanese professional wrestler and qualified Buddhist priest, currently working as a freelancer and is best known for his tenure with the Japanese promotions Pro Wrestling Basara (Basara) and Big Japan Pro Wrestling (BJW).

== Professional wrestling career ==
=== Independent circuit (2015–present) ===
Being a freelancer, Abe is known for his brief tenures with various promotions. On October 31, 2020, at a house show promoted by 666 Pro Wrestling (666), he competed in an intergender three-way match for Ice Ribbon's Triangle Ribbon Championship also involving Ram Kaicho and Koju Takeda. At the 2021 edition of the Pro Wrestling Zero1's Fire Festival, he placed himself in the Block A, and competed against Tsugutaka Sato, Shinjiro Otani, Masato Tanaka, Hartley Jackson and Yoshiki Inamura.

==== All Japan Pro Wrestling (2016–present) ====
Abe debuted in All Japan Pro Wrestling (AJPW) on the sixth night of the 2016 Champion Carnival from April 22, 2016, where he teamed up with Koji Iwamoto and Yutaka Yoshie in a losing effort to Diablo, Hikaru Sato and Masao Inoue. At the AJPW New Year Wars 2017 on January 2, he participated in a 19-man New Year Open battle royal and competed against popular wrestlers such as Takao Omori, Ryouji Sai, Manabu Soya, Minoru Tanaka and others. He took part in the same type of match one year later at the AJPW New Year Wars 2018 on January 2, where he again competed against well known wrestlers such as The Bodyguard, Osamu Nishimura, Kento Miyahara, Kai and others.

At the 2019 edition of the World's Strongest Tag Determination League, Abe competed into a tournament for the AJPW World Junior Heavyweight Championship in which he fell short to Koji Iwamoto in the first round on November 21.

He is known for participating in signature events of the promotion such as the AJPW Junior Tag League, making his first appearance at the 2016 edition of the tournament where he teamed up with his "Astronauts" tag partner Takuya Nomura, and scoring a total of two points after competing against the teams of Axe Bombers (Kazuhiro Tamura and Daichi Kazato), Black Tiger V and Takeshi Minamino, Soma Takao and Yuma Aoyagi, and Atsushi Aoki and Hikaru Sato. At the 2020 edition, he teamed up with Koji Iwamoto as "Jin", defeating Francesco Akira and Takayuki Ueki in the first round, but falling short to Atsuki Aoyagi and Rising Hayato on December 27.

==== Big Japan Pro Wrestling (2017–present) ====
Abe is known for competing in signature events of Big Japan Pro Wrestling (BJW) such as the Saikyo Tag League, and at the 2018 edition of the event, he teamed up with Takuya Nomura, placing themselves in the Strong Style Block and scoring a total of four points after competing against the teams of Kazuki Hashimoto and Yuya Aoki, Hideki Suzuki and Daisuke Sekimoto, Tatsuhiko Yoshino and Kota Sekifuda, Ryuichi Kawakami and Kazumi Kikuta, Daichi Hashimoto and Hideyoshi Kamitani, and Ryota Hama and Yasufumi Nakanoue. On June 13, 2018, Abe participated in a tournament to determine the no.1 contender for Shinobu's BJW Junior Heavyweight Championship where he fell short to Kazuki Hashimoto in the first-round.

At a house show promoted on August 10, 2020, Abe teamed up with Takuya Nomura and defeated Daisuke Sekimoto and Kohei Sato to capture the BJW Tag Team Championship for the first time.

==== DDT Pro Wrestling (2016–present) ====
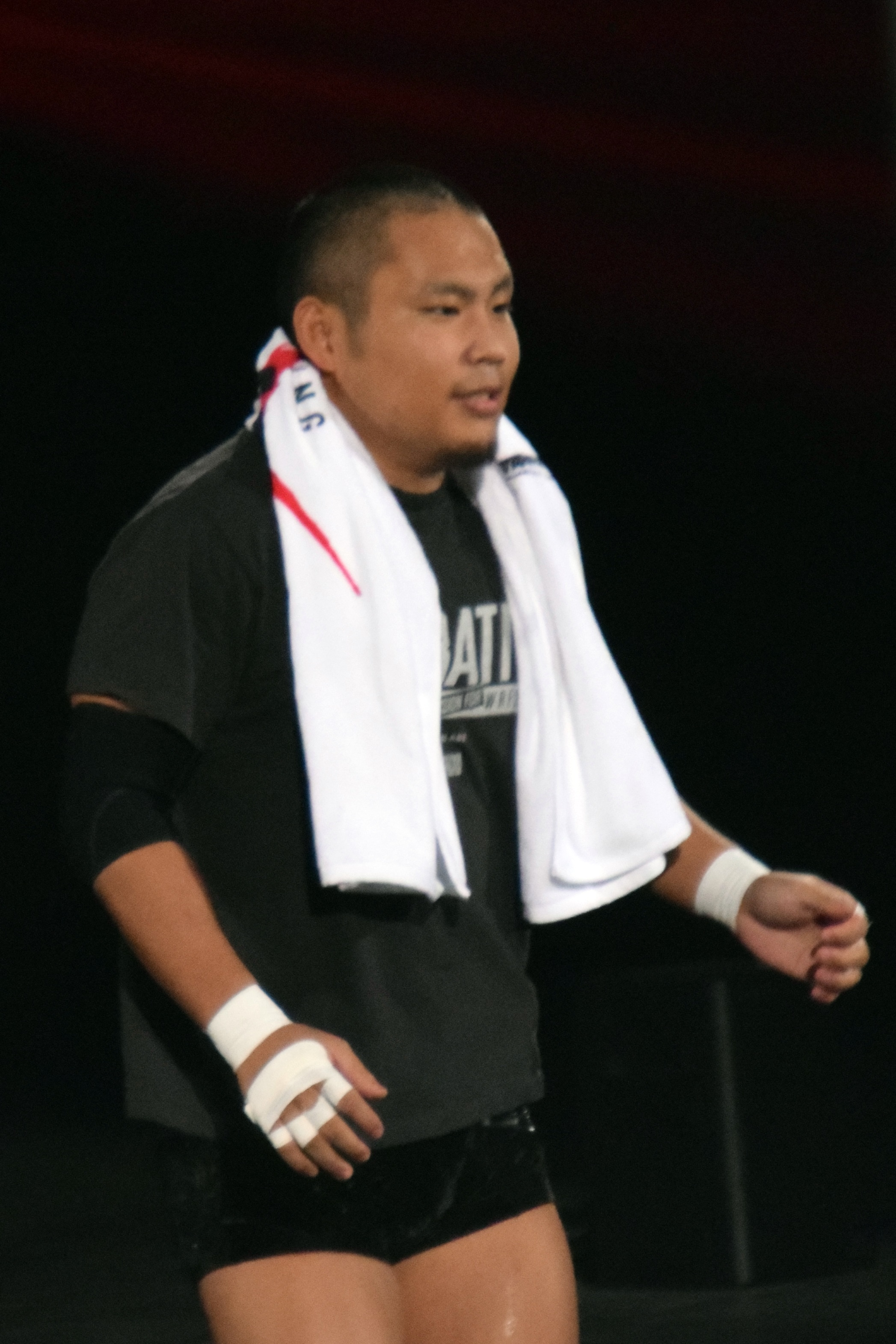
Abe in November 2019

Abe competed mostly under the Pro-Wrestling Basara (Basara) branch of the promotion since joining it in 2015. At Basara 162: Stars Alignment Sky on July 7, 2021, he teamed up with Takuya Nomura as "Astronauts" to defeat Sento Minzoku (Isami Kodaka and Daiki Shimomura) for the Iron Fist Tag Team Championship.

Abe competed in signature events of the promotions such as DDT Judgement. He marked his last appearance at the Judgement 2018: DDT 21st Anniversary on March 25, where he teamed up with Isami Kodaka in a Losers Get Anal Blast Weapon Rumble five-way tag team match also involving Moonlight Express (Mike Bailey and Mao), Michael Nakazawa and Chinsuke Nakamura, Sanshiro Takagi and Ordinary Man Munenori Sawa, and Smile Squash (Yuko Miyamoto and Soma Takao).

Another event is DDT Into The Fight. His only match in this branch of events took place at Into The Fight 2018 on February 25, where he teamed up with Ryuichi Sekine and Ryota Nakatsu in a losing effort to Shuten-dōji (Kudo, Yukio Sakaguchi and Masahiro Takanashi).

== Personal life ==
Outside of the ring, Abe works as a personal trainer for a fitness center called Flenji Kōenji. The gym is owned by Ikuto Hidaka and employs fellow wrestlers Munenori Sawa and Towa Iwasaki. He is also a qualified Jōdo-shū Buddhist priest.

== Championships and accomplishments ==
- All Japan Pro Wrestling
  - Gaora TV Championship (1 time)
  - AJPW TV Six-Man Tag Team Championship (1 time) – with Hikaru Sato and Yuma Aoyagi
- Big Japan Pro Wrestling
  - BJW Tag Team Championship (3 times) – with Takuya Nomura
- DDT Pro-Wrestling
  - KO-D Tag Team Championship (1 time) – with Takuya Nomura
- Guts World Pro-Wrestling
  - GWC Tag Team Championship (1 time) – with Toru
- Kaientai Dojo
  - UWA World Middleweight Championship (1 time)
- Pro-Wrestling Basara
  - Iron Fist Tag Team Championship (2 times) – with Takuya Nomura
  - Union Max Championship (1 time)
  - Itadaki (2022)
- Pro Wrestling Illustrated
  - Ranked No. 325 of the top 500 singles wrestlers in the PWI 500 in 2019
- Toshikoshi Puroresu
  - Toshiwasure! Shuffle Six Man Tag Team Tournament (2023) – with Tetsuya Endo and Daisuke Sekimoto
- Pro Wrestling Zero1
  - NWA World Junior Heavyweight Championship (1 time)
  - International Junior Heavyweight Championship (1 time)
  - NWA International Lightweight Tag Team Championship (1 time) – with Ikuto Hidaka
  - Tenkaichi Junior (2021)
- TTT Pro-Wrestling
  - TTT Indie Unified Six Man Tag Team Championship (1 time) – with Ippanjin Munenori Sawa and Takuya Nomura
- Westside Xtreme Wrestling
  - Ambition 14 (2023)
- Other Accomplishments
  - Battle Royal (2025)
