= Haruka Kato =

Japanese professional wrestler

- 加藤 悠
- Born: 5 February 1989 (age 36)
- Other names: Yuri Haruka
- Occupations: Gravure idol; tarento; ring girl; professional wrestler
- Professional wrestling career
- Born: Yokohama, Kanagawa Prefecture
- Ring name(s): Haruka Kato; Yuri Haruka; Harukaze
- Billed height: 154 cm (5 ft 1 in)
- Billed weight: 50 kg (110 lb)
- Trained by: Tomo Kiire; Fuka Kakimoto; Nanae Takahashi; Great Mucha; Makoto
- Debut: 25 December 2011

Haruka Kato (加藤 悠, Katō Haruka; born 5 February 1989), also known by ring name Harukaze, is a Japanese gravure idol, tarento, and professional wrestler. She was born in Yokohama, Kanagawa Prefecture.

== As a tarento ==
After graduating from Eiwa Girls College, she was scouted and became a part-time manager of an entertainment office because she was interested in managing work. She was auditioned at the recommendation of the president of her office and started to perform gravure and made television appearances.

== As a professional wrestler ==
Kato was scouted by World Wonder Ring Stardom GM Fuka Kakimoto.

On 14 November 2011 she passed the pro-tests with the other third graders. On 25 December, she made her debut with Natsuki Taiyo. At that time her ring name was Yuri Haruka.

In September 2012, she suffered an injury during a kickboxing practice which caused a long absence.

On 14 August 2013 she returned to wrestling.

She made her full return to the WNC Wrestle Battlefield Convention on 26 January 2014 in a duo with Kaho Kobayashi, she played against Makoto and Miyako Matsumoto, but succumbed to Makoto's spear move. Her ring name used was her real name, and her costume was also renewed.

On 30 March 2014 she appeared in her sixth Shinshu Girls battle with Koyuki Hayashi.

In 2015, she joined JWP Joshi Puroresu with Eri who was renamed from Eri Susae and later joined the "JWP Tag League the Best". On 8 March 2015 she took part in Stardom's Shinkiba Competition. On 14 June, at the Stadium Korakuen Hall Competition, her fight with Hatsuhinode Kamen became her first solo victory.

After the Stadium Shinkiba Competition on 29 May 2016, due to worsening of asthma, she took a break from her wrestling career. She returned the following year.

== Filmography ==
=== Television ===
- "Pu'" Suma (EX)
- Ariken (TX)
- Shimura-ya desu. (CX)
- Rank Ōkoku (TBS)
- Onegai! Ranking (EX)
- Marusummers (TBS)
- Ano News de Tokusuru Hito Sonsuru Hito (NTV)

=== Ring girl ===
- Jewels

=== DVD ===
1. Haruka Kato Harukawa! (30 Aug 2013, Grasso)
2. Yūnaru Chōsen! Anata no Heart ni Udejūji Harukawa Returns Yū yarimasu!! (28 Mar 2014, Grasso)

== Championships and accomplishments ==
- DDT Pro-Wrestling
  - GWC 6-Man Tag Team Championship (1 time) – with Keisuke Ishii and Kouki Iwasaki

== See also ==
- List of Japanese gravure idols
- List of professional wrestling rosters
