= BJW Junior Heavyweight Championship (2017–present) =

- Official design of the BJW Junior Heavyweight Championship (2017 – present)

Details
- Promotion: Big Japan Pro Wrestling
- Date established: May 7, 2017
- Current champion: Shoki Kitamura
- Date won: May 5, 2025

Other name
- BJW World Strong Junior Heavyweight Championship
Statistics
- First champion: Shinobu
- Most reigns: Kota Sekifuda (2 reigns)
- Longest reign: Kota Sekifuda (651 days)
- Shortest reign: Tatsuhiko Yoshino (70 days)
- Oldest champion: Ikuto Hidaka (52 years, 7 days)
- Youngest champion: Yuya Aoki (23 years, 5 days)
- Heaviest champion: Shoki Kitamura (198 lb)
- Lightest champion: Ender Kara (143 lb)

The BJW Junior Heavyweight Championship is a title defended in the Japanese professional wrestling promotion Big Japan Pro Wrestling (BJW).

On May 7, 2017, BJW announced that it was bringing back the BJW Junior Heavyweight Championship with a tournament set to take place between May 25 and July 17. The title is distinct from the previous BJW Junior Heavyweight Championship that was established in 1998 and was retired in 2002. The title has a weight limit of 95 kg (209 lb). Wrestlers over the weight limit will be eligible to challenge for the BJW World Strong Heavyweight Championship.

There have been a total of thirteen reigns shared between twelve different champions. The current champion is Shoki Kitamura who is in his first reign.

== Inaugural tournament ==
The round-robin league began on May 25, 2017, and ran all the way through to the decision match, between the top two, on the July 17 show at Ryōgoku Kokugikan.

Final standings
Wrestler	Score
Kazuki Hashimoto	8
Shinobu	6
Tatsuhiko Yoshino	6
Toshiyuki Sakuda	4
Takuya Nomura	4
Yuya Aoki	2

Results	Hashimoto	Shinobu	Nomura	Yoshino	Sakuda	Aoki
Hashimoto	—N/a	Kazuki (12:56)	Kazuki (12:35)	Yoshino (11:57)	Kazuki (11:24)	Kazuki (8:09)
Shinobu	Kazuki (12:56)	—N/a	Shinobu (9:38)	Shinobu (11:55)	Shinobu (9:28)	Aoki (7:11)
Nomura	Kazuki (12:35)	Shinobu (9:38)	—N/a	Takuya (12:50)	Sakuda (10:38)	Nomura (7:13)
Yoshino	Yoshino (11:57)	Shinobu (11:55)	Takuya (12:50)	—N/a	Yoshino (9:26)	Yoshino (8:02)
Sakuda	Kazuki (11:24)	Shinobu (9:28)	Sakuda (10:38)	Yoshino (9:26)	—N/a	Sakuda (9:22)
Aoki	Kazuki (8:09)	Aoki (7:11)	Nomura (7:13)	Yoshino (8:02)	Sakuda (9:22)	—N/a

Final
1	Kazuki Hashimoto	Pin
2	Shinobu	13:18

== Title history ==
As of October 30, 2026.

Key
No.	Overall reign number
Reign	Reign number for the specific champion
Days	Number of days held
Defenses	Number of successful defenses

No.	Champion	Championship change			Reign statistics			Notes	Ref.
No.	Champion	Date	Event	Location	Reign	Days	Defenses	Notes	Ref.
1	Shinobu	July 17, 2017	Ryōgokutan 2017	Tokyo	1	391	6	Defeated Kazuki Hashimoto in the finals of a six-man round-robin tournament to become the inaugural champion.	
2	Kazuki Hashimoto	August 12, 2018	Midsummer Korakuen Battles	Tokyo	1	266	3		
3	Tajiri	May 5, 2019	Endless Survivor 2019	Yokohama, Japan	1	133	3		
4	Yuya Aoki	September 15, 2019	Big Japan Death Vegas 2019'	Yokohama, Japan	1	402	4		
5	Tatsuhiko Yoshino	October 21, 2020	BJW Death Match, Strong & Junior 3 Major Title Matches	Yokohama, Japan	1	70	2		
6	Isami Kodaka	December 30, 2020	BJW Final Box Office of the Year	Tokyo, Japan	1	204	4		
7	Kota Sekifuda	July 22, 2021	BJW Yokohama Radiant Hall Tournament	Yokohama, Japan	1	651	11		
8	Tomato Kaji	May 4, 2023	BJW Endless Survivor ~ Infinity Independent	Yokohama, Japan	1	240	4		
9	Ender Kara	December 30, 2023	BJW	Tokyo, Japan	1	126	3		
10	Kota Sekifuda	May 4, 2024	BJW Endless Survivor ~ Beyond The Milestone	Yokohama, Japan	2	100	1		
11	Ikuto Hidaka	August 12, 2024	BJW	Tokyo, Japan	1	266	4		
12	Kosuke Sato	May 5, 2025	BJW 30th Anniversary ~ Dainichi Spirit	Yokohama, Japan	1	475	6		
13	Shoki Kitamura	August 23, 2026	BJW	Tokyo, Japan	1	68+	1		

=== Combined reigns ===
As of October 30, 2026.

†	Indicates the current champion

Rank	Wrestler	No. of reigns	Combined defenses	Combined days
1	Kota Sekifuda	2	12	751
2	Kosuke Sato	1	6	475
3	Yuya Aoki	1	4	402
4	Shinobu	1	6	391
5	Ikuto Hidaka	1	4	266
5	Kazuki Hashimoto	1	3	266
7	Tomato Kaji	1	4	240
8	Isami Kodaka	1	4	204
9	Tajiri	1	3	133
10	Ender Kara	1	3	126
11	Tatsuhiko Yoshino	1	2	70
12	Shoki Kitamura †	1	1	68+
