= Guts Ishijima =

Japanese professional wrestler

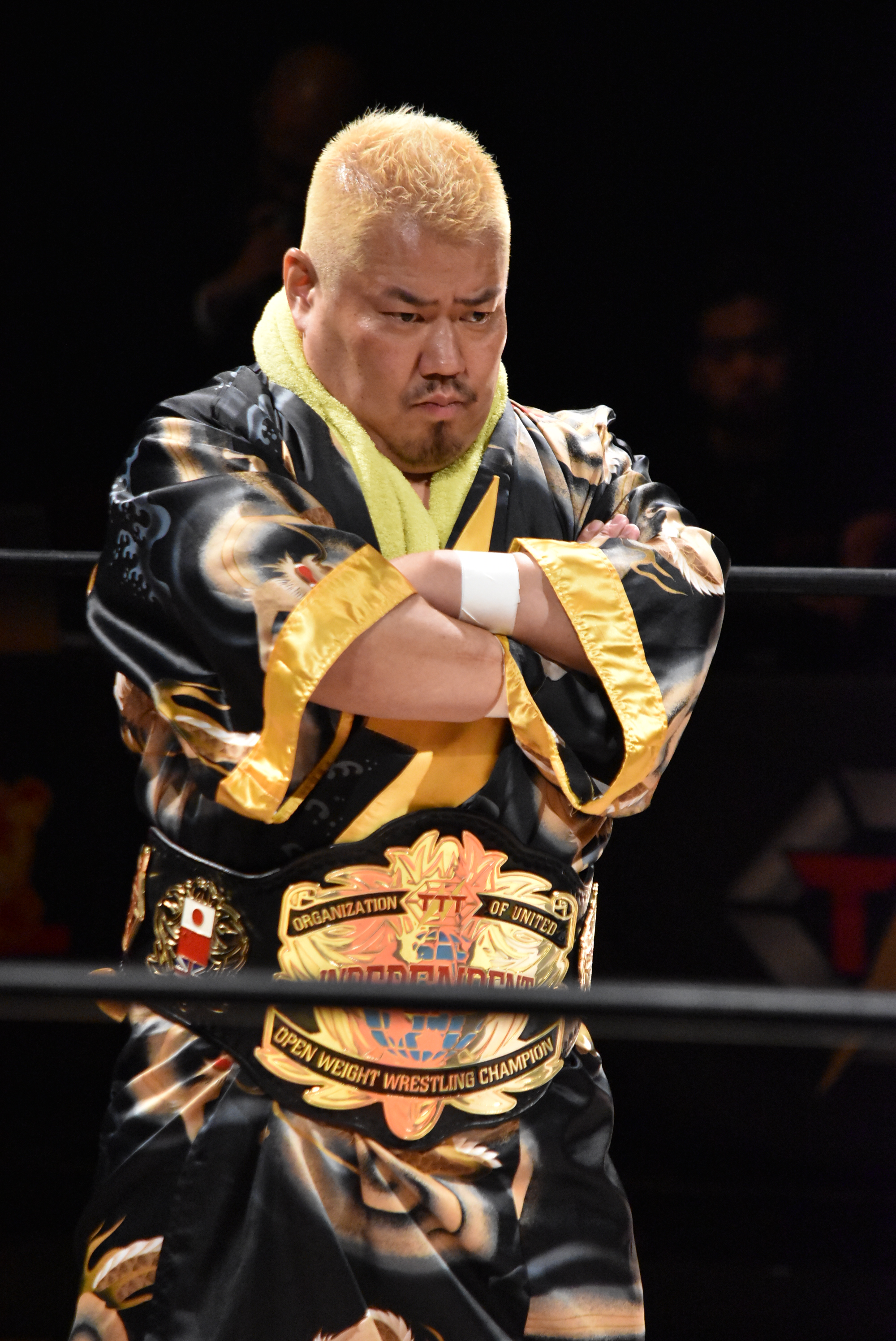
- Ishijima in 2023

Personal information
- Born: Kenji Ishijima; January 3, 1981 (age 45) Kasukabe, Saitama

Professional wrestling career
- Ring name(s): Guts Snake Island; Guts Ishijima; Guts Jajima; Yellow Badi; Ken-chan
- Billed height: 176 cm (5 ft 9 in)
- Billed weight: 120 kg (265 lb)
- Debut: 2004

Kenji Ishijima (石島健至, Ishijima Kenji; born January 3, 1981) is a Japanese professional wrestler better known under the ring name Guts Ishijima (ガッツ石島, Gattsu Ishijima). He is currently working as a freelancer and is best known for having founded the Japanese promotions Guts World Pro-Wrestling and Total Triumph Team Pro-Wrestling (TTT).

== Professional wrestling career ==
=== Independent circuit (2004–present) ===
Ishijima took part of a 74-man tag team match at New Years Eve Pro-Wrestling, an event promoted by the Japanese independent scene on December 31, 2011 where he teamed up with notable partners such as Abdullah Kobayashi, Harashima, Natsuki Taiyo, Shuji Ishikawa and Daisuke Sekimoto to defeat the likes of Atsushi Kotoge, Kaori Yoneyama, Kazuhiro Tamura, Taka Michinoku, Mio Shirai, Yuji Okabayashi and many others. At Gatoh Move Japan Tour #50 ~ Summer Vacation Approaching!, an event promoted by Gatoh Move Pro Wrestling on July 15, 2013, Ishijima teamed up with Sayaka Obihiro in a losing effort to Emi Sakura and Kaori Yoneyama. At 666 Vol. 90/Shinjuku 2-Chome Shinobu Debut 15th Anniversary Memorial, an event promoted by the 666 Promotion on June 6, 2020, Ishijima competed in a three-way tag team match in which he teamed up with Banana Senga, Hiroaki Taniguchi and Yanagawa to defeat the teams of Fuminori Abe, Koju Takeda, Konaka, Taro Yamada, Akkun Ohashi, Jun Kasai, Masashi Takeda and Nene Dai, Onryo, Shinobu and Yuko Miyamoto.

==== Guts World Pro-Wrestling (2004–2018) ====
Ishijima was the owner of Guts World Pro-Wrestling, a promotion which he founded and led since 2004 after he graduated in amateur wrestling at SWS Gakusei Pro Wrestling while he was studying at Teikyo University. The promotion held its first show titled Guts World Vol. 1 on December 4, 2004 at the Shin-Kiba 1st Ring arena, during which he teamed with Ryan Upin is a losing effort to Daisuke and Mineo Fujita. At the Guts World The Final ~ Bukotsu Shuen event, the promotion's final show which took place on April 15, 2018, Ishijima defended the GWC Singles Championship one last time successfully against Masked Mystery. The show also portraited the retirement match of Mr. Gannosuke who teamed up with Michio Kageyama in a losing effort to Tatsumi Fujinami and Hiro Saito.

==== Pro-Wrestling Heat-Up (2018–2019) ====
On April 20, 2018, Ishijima announced he would join Pro-Wrestling Heat-Up where he would be leading a new brand named Going-Up. The first Going-Up show was held on May 27. In the main event, Ishijima teamed with Buffalo to defeat Daisuke Kanehira and Joji Ootani.

==== Real Guts Army (2019–present) ====
Ishijima left Heat-Up on February 3, 2019 to form an independent group called Real Guts Army (Japanese: 真GUTS軍) alongside Masked Mystery. Together, they produced a handful of shows between May and December 2019.

==== Total Triumph Team Pro-Wrestling (2020–present) ====
On December 7, 2019, at the Guts Ishijima's Debut 15th Anniversary show, Ishijima announced he would create a new promotion with Masked Mystery, Toru and Shunsuke Sayama. The promotion, named Total Triumph Team (TTT), launched on January 25, 2020. On June 13, 2021, at TTT Big Match 2021, Ishijima and Speed Of Sounds (Banana Senga and Tsutomu Oosugi) won the GWC 6-Man Tag Team Championship (a trios title originally defended in Guts World before it temporarily moved to DDT Pro-Wrestling's sub-brand Ganbare☆Pro-Wrestling in 2018) to bring the title back to TTT.

== Championships and accomplishments ==
- DDT Pro-Wrestling

- Ironman Heavymetalweight Championship (2 times)

- GPS Promotion

- WBC Tag Team Championship (1 time) – with Masked Mystery

- Guts World Pro-Wrestling

- GWC Singles Championship (3 times)
- GWC Tag Team Championship (1 time) – with Michio Kageyama
- GWC 6-Man Tag Team Championship (8 times) – with Gami and Minami (1), Bungee Takada and Tatsuhiko Yoshino (1), Masked Mystery and Leonardo Takatsu (1), Devil Invader and Toshihiro Sueyoshi (1), Amigo Suzuki and Chango (1), Daisuke and Tatsuhiko Yoshino (1) and Chango and Michio Kageyama (1)
  - Akuma Domei Saiykou Decision Tournament A-1 Climax (2012)

- Pro-Wrestling Heat-Up/Real Guts Army

- CCW Canadian Heavyweight Championship (1 time)

- Total Triumph Team Pro-Wrestling

- GWC 6-Man Tag Team Championship (1 time) – with Tsutomu Oosugi and Banana Senga
- TTT Indie Unified Six Man Tag Team Championship (1 time) – with Masked Mystery and Tetsuhiro Kuroda
- TTT Indie Unified Openweight Championship (5 time, current)
