= Tatsuhiko Yoshino =

Japanese professional wrestler (born 1985)

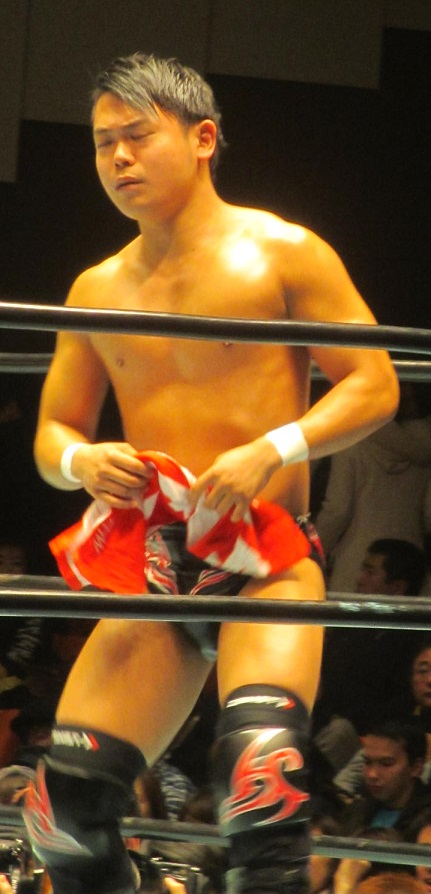
- Yoshino in March 2017

Personal information
- Born: Tatsuhiko Kimura (木村達彦, Kimura Tatsuhiko); August 31, 1985 (age 41) Akita, Japan
- Spouse: Kaori Sanada (m. 2018)
- Children: 1

Professional wrestling career
- Ring name: Tatsuhiko Yoshino
- Billed height: 1.73 m (5 ft 8 in)
- Billed weight: 80 kg (180 lb)
- Trained by: Guts Ishijima
- Debut: December 4, 2004

Tatsuhiko Kimura (木村達彦, Kimura Tatsuhiko; born August 31, 1985) is a Japanese professional wrestler better known by the ring name Tatsuhiko Yoshino (吉野達彦, Yoshino Tatsuhiko), currently signed to Big Japan Pro Wrestling (BJW) in the Strong J division, where he is a former BJW Junior Heavyweight Champion. He was trained by Guts Ishijima and debuted for Ishijima's Guts World Pro-Wrestling (Guts World) in 2004. After a hiatus from professional wrestling starting in 2006, he returned to Guts World in 2009, where he became an important wrestler in the promotion, winning the GWC Championship and GWC Tag Team Championship once. He official signed with BJW in 2017.

== Professional wrestling career ==
=== Guts World Pro-Wrestling (2004–2006, 2009–2016) ===
Yoshino debuted with Guts World Pro-Wrestling (Guts World) in 2004, and made occasional appearances for the promotion until 2006, when he took a hiatus from professional wrestling. He returned in March 2009, and in only his second match back captured the GWC 6-Man Tag Team Championship alongside Bungee Takada and his trainer, Guts Ishijima. He also participated in a tournament to crown the vacant Guts World Tag Team Champions alongside Satoshi Kajiwara, where they were eliminated in the semi-final by Gentaro and Masked Mystery in the semi-final. In May 2010, Yoshino made it to the final of a tournament to crown the new GWC Champion, but lost to Guts Ishijima.

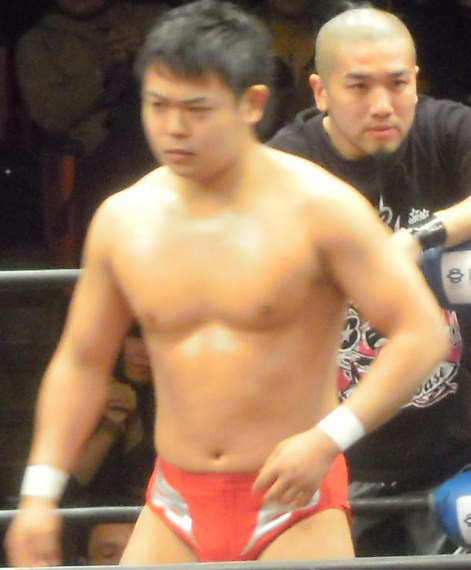
Yoshino in 2011

On May 12, 2012, Yoshino won his first title in Guts World, teaming with Taro Yamada to defeat Bear Fukuda and Mototsugu Shimizu for the GWC Tag Team Championship. They eventually lost the titles to Amigo Suzuki and Chango on June 3. On April 14, 2013, Yoshino unsuccessfully challenged Ishijima for the GWC Championship. On July 20, 2014, Yoshino won the 2014 King Of Guts Tournament, defeating Ishijima in the final for the first time in his career, and on October 12, defeated Kenichiro Arai to capture the GWC Championship for the first time in his career. On March 28, he lost the championship to Daisuke. Beginning in late 2015, Yoshino's appearances in Guts World became more sporadic, and he wrestled his last match in the promotion to date on December 3, 2016, losing to Ishijima.

=== Big Japan Pro Wrestling (2010–present) ===
Yoshino first began appearing for Big Japan Pro Wrestling (BJW) in 2010, and began competing as a regular in late 2015 before signing a contract with the promotion in 2017 as part of the newly rebranded junior heavyweight division, Strong J. Starting on May 25, Yoshino participated in a tournament to crown the inaugural BJW Junior Heavyweight Champion; despite earning six points from three wins, he missed out on the tournament finals due to a tie breaker loss to Shinobu. On July 17, at Ryogokutan 2017, Yoshino teamed with Ryuichi Sekine to defeat Kota Sekifuda and Yuya Aoki, with Yoshino scoring the pinfall over Sekifuda. In the aftermath, Yoshino would form tag team with Sekifuda known as the Party Boys. On December 3, Yoshino unsuccessfully challenged Shinobu for the BJW Junior Heavyweight Championship. From August 25 to September 24, 2018, the Party Boys participated in their first Saikyo Tag League as part of the Strong block; they failed to progress to the semi-finals but picked up an impressive victory over Daisuke Sekimoto and Hideki Suzuki. On October 8, Yoshino unsuccessfully challenged Kazuki Hashimoto for the BJW Junior Heavyweight Championship. Following his marriage in November 2018, Yoshino has almost exclusively performed on taped and pay-per-view shows, allowing him time to focus on his career as a personal trainer to provide for his growing family. Nevertheless, on July 30, Yoshino and Sekifuda unsuccessfully challenged Tajiri in a three-way match for the BJW Junior Heavyweight Championship. On November 4, at Ryogokutan 2019, he unsuccessfully challenged Yuya Aoki for the BJW Junior Heavyweight Championship in a four way that also included Sekifuda and Tajiri. On July 15, he entered the BJW Junior Heavyweight Championship Next Challenger Tournament. After victories against Sekifuda, Takoyakida and Kazuki Hashimoto, he defeated Shinobu in the tournament final on August 29. On October 21, Yoshino won the BJW Junior Heavyweight Championship from Yuya Aoki. Yoshino successfully defended his title against Sekifuda and Andy Wu in November but lost the title to Isami Kodaka on December 30. After his tag team partner Sekifuda won the BJW Junior Heavyweight Championship on July 22, Yoshino was nominated as his first title defence. On September 23, Yoshino was defeated by Sekifuda but have continued teaming together.

== Personal life ==
Outside of professional wrestling, Kimura is a fully qualified personal trainer, and teaches exercise classes for adults at the Tokyo Fitness Club, and for children at the Asuka Culture School. In November 2018, he married TBS TV announcer Kaori Sanada, together they have a daughter born July 26, 2019.

== Championships and accomplishments ==
- Big Japan Pro Wrestling

- BJW Junior Heavyweight Championship (1 time)
- Yokohama Shopping Street 6-Man Tag Team Championship (1 time) – with Brahman Shu and Brahman Kei

- Guts World Pro-Wrestling

- GWC Championship (1 time)
- GWC Tag Team Championship (1 time) – with Taro Yamada
- GWC 6-Man Tag Team Championship (3 times) – with Guts Ishijima and Bungee Takada (1), Daisuke and Taro Yamada (1) and Daisuke and Guts Ishijima (1)
- King Of Guts (2014)
