= Isami Kodaka =

Japanese professional wrestler (born 1981)

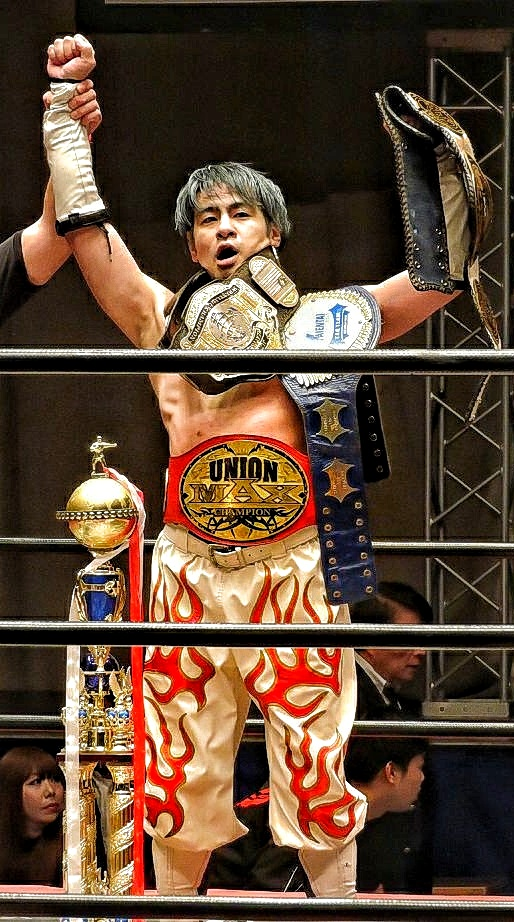
- Kodaka in March 2018

Personal information
- Born: September 27, 1981 (age 45) Yokohama, Kanagawa

Professional wrestling career
- Ring name(s): Fūma Kotarō; Isami; Isami Kodaka; Sanada Yukimura; White Eyebrow Baryo
- Billed height: 1.72 m (5 ft 7 1/2 in)
- Billed weight: 75 kg (165 lb)
- Trained by: Jaki Numazawa; Jun Kasai; Taka Michinoku
- Debut: July 18, 2002

Isami Kodaka (木高 イサミ, Kodaka Isami; born September 27, 1981) is a Japanese professional wrestler, currently signed to Pro-Wrestling Basara (Basara). He originally started his career in the Kaientai Dojo (K-Dojo) promotion in July 2002, but later left the promotion to become a freelancer, before signing with Union Pro Wrestling (Union Pro) in 2005. Through Union Pro's working relationship, Kodaka also began working for Big Japan Pro Wrestling (BJW), where he adopted his current, hardcore wrestling-based style. Kodaka remained affiliated with Union Pro until the promotion folded in October 2015, after which he became a founding member of Pro-Wrestling Basara (Basara).

Kodaka is currently in his fourth reign as the Union Max Champion, and his second reign as BJW Deathmatch Heavyweight Champion, while also being a former one-time KO-D Openweight Champion and three-time DDT Extreme Champion. He is also known as one half of the tag team Yankee Nichokenju (ヤンキー二丁拳銃, Yankī Nichōkenjū; "Yankee Pistols Akimbo") with Yuko Miyamoto. The two are former one-time All Asia Tag Team Champions, two-time BJW Tag Team Champions, one-time KO-D Tag Team Champions and one-time Wave Tag Team Champions and have also won the Saikyo Tag League three times. Kodaka has also won both the BJW Tag Team Championship and the Saikyo Tag League once with Masashi Takeda.

== Professional wrestling career ==
=== Early career (2002–2005) ===
Kodaka was trained in professional wrestling by Taka Michinoku at his Kaientai Dojo (K-Dojo) promotion's training school. Kodaka, using only his given name as his ring name, made his professional wrestling debut for the promotion on July 18, 2002, facing Daisuke Matsumoto. Kodaka left Kaientai Dojo shortly afterwards to become a freelancer.

=== Union Pro (2005–2015) ===
In 2005, Isami ended his freelancing days, when he signed a contract with the Union Pro Wrestling (Union Pro) promotion. Through Union Pro's working relationship with the Big Japan Pro Wrestling (BJW) promotion, Isami also made appearances for BJW, where he started a storyline with Jaki Numazawa and Mad Man Pondo, which led to him evolving his mixed martial arts-based wrestling style into a more deathmatch-based style. He was trained in the deathmatch style by Numazawa and Jun Kasai at their BJW affiliated School of Death training school. He made his deathmatch debut in 2006 and has retained the style ever since. In the deathmatch circles, Isami found himself a generational rival in Yuko Miyamoto.

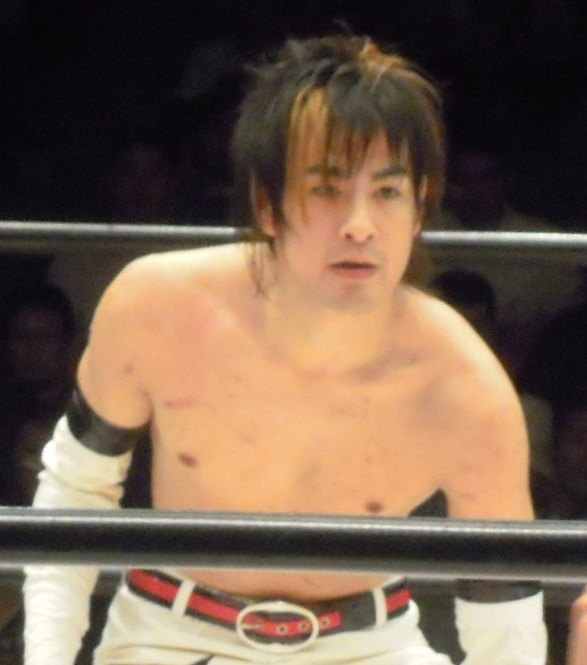
Kodaka in May 2010

In June 2007, Kodaka suffered a cervical disc herniation, which would sideline him for eleven months. Upon his return to the ring, Kodaka, now working under his full name, won his first professional wrestling title, when he and Masashi Takeda defeated Takashi Sasaki and Yuko Miyamoto on May 28 to win BJW's 2009 Saikyo Tag League and become the new BJW Tag Team Champions. The duo held the title for two months, before losing it to Daisuke Sekimoto and Yuji Okabayashi, after which Kodaka formed a new tag team named "Deathmatch Nichokenju", later renamed "Yankee Nichokenju", with longtime rival Yuko Miyamoto. In 2010, Kodaka made several appearances for women's wrestling promotion Ice Ribbon, where he and Chii Tomiya won the International Ribbon Tag Team Championship by defeating Jun Kasai and Miyako Matsumoto on August 7. On June 25, Kodaka also made an appearance for Smash, losing to Kushida in a "World Tryout" match. On January 3, 2011, Kodaka won his first singles title and his first title in his home promotion of Union Pro, when he defeated Kim Nan Pun for the DDT Extreme Championship in a six-man tag team captain's fall match, where he, Keita Yano and Survival Tobita faced Nan Pun, Cao Zhang and Choun Shiryu. On May 5, Yankee Nichokenju won their first title together, when they defeated Jaki Numazawa and Jun Kasai for the BJW Tag Team Championship. After an eight-month reign, Kodaka lost the DDT Extreme Championship to El Generico on September 19. Kodaka regained the title from El Generico on January 3, 2012, only to lose it to his own tag team partner, Yuko Miyamoto, on March 29 as part of an interpromotional rivalry between Union Pro and BJW. On April 1, Kodaka and Miyamoto also lost the BJW Tag Team Championship to Shinobu and Yoshihito Sasaki. The two bounced back on November 22 by winning the 2012 Saikyo Tag League and becoming the new BJW Tag Team Champions. On January 14, 2013, Kodaka won the DDT Extreme Championship for the third time, after defeating Keisuke Ishii. However, his reign lasted only thirteen days, before losing the title to Kenny Omega in a match also contested for Union Pro's parent promotion DDT Pro-Wrestling's top title, the KO-D Openweight Championship. On August 18 at Ryōgoku Peter Pan 2013, DDT's biggest event of the year, Kodaka and Miyamoto defeated Hikaru Sato and Yukio Sakaguchi to win the KO-D Tag Team Championship for the first time and become double tag team champions. Following their win, Kodaka and Miyamoto vowed to successfully defend their double crown hundred times. Yankee Nichokenju went undefeated for most of 2013, before losing to Speed of Sounds (Hercules Senga and Tsutomu Oosugi) in a non-title match on October 18.

On November 4, Kodaka defeated Shuji Ishikawa to win BJW's top title, the BJW Deathmatch Heavyweight Championship, becoming the lightest champion in the title's history. On November 22, Yankee Nichokenju avenged their loss against the Speed of Sounds in the finals of the 2013 Saikyo Tag League to retain the BJW Tag Team Championship and become the first team to win the tournament twice in a row. Kodaka dominated Samurai TV's year-end independent wrestling awards ceremony, winning the Best Unit Award with Yuko Miyamoto, the Best Bout Award with Shuji Ishikawa and the MVP Award. Yankee Nichokenju's reign as double tag team champions came to an end on January 26, 2014, when they lost the KO-D Tag Team Championship to the Golden☆Lovers (Kenny Omega and Kota Ibushi) in a three-way match, also involving the team of Konosuke Takeshita and Tetsuya Endo. On March 23, Kodaka defeated Ivan Markov to become the second Union Max Champion. On May 5, Yankee Nichokenju faced off in a 300 fluorescent light tube TLC deathmatch for the BJW Deathmatch Heavyweight Championship. Kodaka won the match, making his fourth successful title defense. On May 18, Kodaka lost the Union Max Championship to Hikaru Sato in his first defense. On May 25, Kodaka also lost the BJW Deathmatch Heavyweight Championship to Ryuji Ito. Six days later, Yankee Nichokenju lost the BJW Tag Team Championship to Twin Towers (Kohei Sato and Shuji Ishikawa), ending their eighteen-month reign at seventeen successful title defenses.

On June 29, Kodaka defeated Kudo in the finals to win the 2014 King of DDT tournament and become the number one contender to the KO-D Openweight Championship for DDT's biggest event of the year, Ryogoku Peter Pan. On July 27, Yankee Nichokenju won women's wrestling promotion Pro Wrestling Wave's Tag Team Championship by defeating Las Aventureras (Ayako Hamada and Yuu Yamagata). On August 17 at Ryogoku Peter Pan 2014, Kodaka failed in his attempt to capture the KO-D Openweight Championship from Harashima in a three-way elimination match, which also included Kenny Omega. On August 24, Yankee Nichokenju lost the Wave Tag Team Championship to Sakuragohan (Kyusei Sakura Hirota and Mika Iida) in a three-way match, which also included Las Aventureras. Back in Union Pro on August 31, Kodaka and Fuma defeated Hiroshi Fukuda and Men's Teioh to win the UWA World Tag Team Championship. On October 2, Kodaka made an appearance for Pro Wrestling Noah, teaming with Yuko Miyamoto and Daisuke Sekimoto in a six-man tag team main event, where they defeated Atsushi Kotoge, Hitoshi Kumano and Naomichi Marufuji. After finishing second in the Dramatic Sousenkyo ("general election"), Kodaka was granted another shot at the KO-D Openweight Championship, but was defeated by Harashima in the title match on October 26. On November 21, Yankee Nichokenju defeated Abdullah Kobayashi and Ryuji Ito in the finals to win their third Saikyo Tag League in a row. On December 31, Yankee Nichokenju took part in Toshikoshi Puroresu, an annual new year's collaboration event between BJW, DDT and Kaientai Dojo, winning the Tenka Toitsu! tournament, held for the first time in a tag team format. On January 24, 2015, Kodaka and Fuma lost the UWA World Tag Team Championship to Masato Shibata and Shuji Ishikawa in their fourth defense.

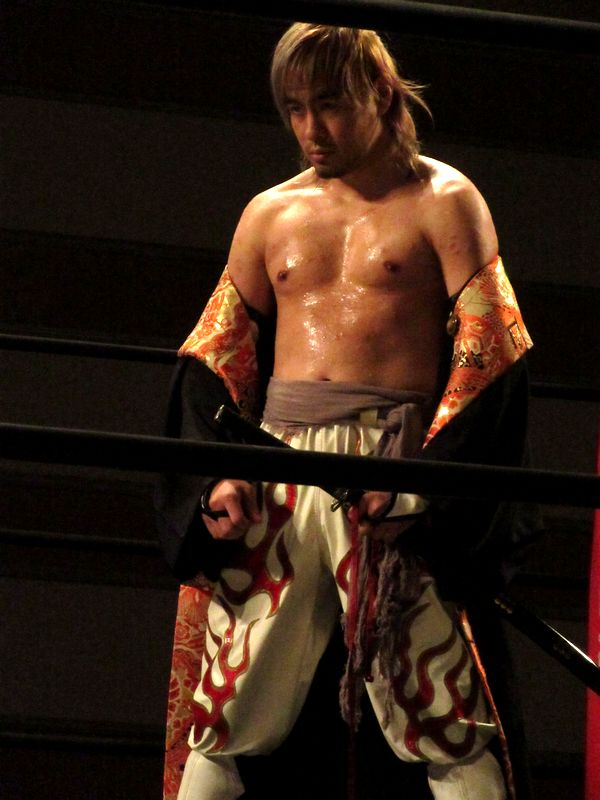
Kodaka in May 2016

Shortly after losing to UWA World Tag Team Championship, Kodaka and Fuma began feuding with each other, starting on February 22, when Fuma defeated Kodaka in the finals of the Get the Glory 2015 tournament, following outside interference from Kazushi Miyamoto and Sagat, with whom he went on to form a new villainous stable. On March 1, Kodaka unsuccessfully challenged Fuma for the Union Max Championship. On April 12, Kodaka returned to Kaientai Dojo, defeating Hi69 to win the Independent World Junior Heavyweight Championship. In July, Kodaka made it to the finals of Pro Wrestling Zero1's 2015 Tenkaichi Jr. tournament, but was defeated there by Ikuto Hidaka. On August 30, Kodaka defeated Fuma to win the Union Max Championship for the second time. On October 4, Union Pro held its tenth anniversary event, which also marked the promotion's final event before folding. The main event of the show saw Kodaka make his first successful defense of the Union Max Championship against Shuji Ishikawa, retiring the title immediately afterwards.

=== Pro-Wrestling Basara (2015–present) ===
On October 7, 2015, Kodaka, along with five other former Union Pro wrestlers, announced the formation of a new promotion named Pro-Wrestling Basara (Basara), set to launch in January 2016. That same day, Kodaka won the 2015 Dramatic Sousenkyo, DDT's annual general election, to earn a shot at the KO-D Openweight Championship. In October, Yankee Nichokenju took part in All Japan Pro Wrestling (AJPW)'s Jr. Tag Battle of Glory, where they finished second with a record of two wins, one draw and one loss, suffered against Atsushi Aoki and Hikaru Sato in their last round-robin match, the de facto final of the tournament. On November 1, Kodaka lost the Independent World Junior Heavyweight Championship to Shiori Asahi. On November 15, Kodaka and Miyamoto defeated Kotaro Suzuki and Yohei Nakajima in a decision match to win the vacant All Asia Tag Team Championship. On November 28, Kodaka defeated Yukio Sakaguchi to win the KO-D Openweight Championship for the first time. After three successful defenses, he lost the title to Harashima on March 21, 2016, at Judgement 2016: DDT 19th Anniversary. After six successful title defenses, Kodaka and Miyamoto lost the All Asia Tag Team Championship to Atsushi Aoki and Hikaru Sato on July 24 at a BJW event. On November 30, Kodaka and Takumi Tsukamoto defeated Ikuto Hidaka and Hayato Fujita at a Basara event to win Pro Wrestling Zero1's NWA International Lightweight Tag Team Championship. On December 25, Kodaka defeated Trans-Am★Hiroshi in a decision match to win the reactivated Union Max Championship. He lost the title to Fuma in his first defense on January 6, 2017. Two days later, Kodaka and Tsukamoto lost the NWA International Lightweight Tag Team Championship to Ryota Nakatsu and Ryuichi Sekine in their third defense. They regained the title on February 12. On March 2, Kodaka and Tsukamoto took the title back to Zero1, losing it to Koji Kanemoto and Minoru Tanaka.

On May 28, Kodaka defeated Kengo Mashimo to win Kaientai Dojo's top title, the Strongest-K Championship. After two successful defenses, he lost the title to Tank Nagai on September 18. On October 1, Basara held Kodaka's 15th anniversary event, which saw him defeat Trans-Am★Ryuichi in the main event to become the new Union Max Champion. Back in K-DOJO, Kodaka and Tank Nagai won the Strongest-K Tag Team Championship from Dinosaur Takuma and Kotaro Yoshino on November 12 and joined the Magatsuki stable. On February 12, 2018, he went to a time limit draw with Yusuke Obata for the Zero1 World Heavyweight Championship. Despite the draw, Isami used this to angle a match with duel junior heavyweight champion Sean Guinness and defeated him on March 4 to win the International Junior Heavyweight Championship and World Junior Heavyweight Championship. On April 5, Yankee Nichokenju defeated the Crazy Lovers (Masashi Takeda and Takumi Tsukamoto) for their third BJW Tag Team Championship. After losing the Strongest-K Tag Team Championships on April 22, Kodaka and Nagai were both kicked out of Magatsuki the following month. On May 3, Kodaka lost the Union Max Championship to Naoki Tanizaki where the Dove World Heavyweight Championship was also on the line. On June 20, Kodaka unsuccessfully challenged Masashi Takeda for the BJW Deathmatch Heavyweight Championship. On July 21, despite a successful title defences against the Crazy Lovers, Yankee Nichokenju were forced to vacate the BJW Tag Team Championship after Miyamoto forgot to bring the belt to the event. On September 8, Kodaka travelled to the US to participate in the Game Changer Wrestling's Nick Gage Invitational 3, losing the finals to Masashi Takeda. On September 21, Kodaka fractured his jaw during a cage match against Masashi Takeda; he would be out for over three months and would be forced to vacate the Zero1 junior heavyweight titles. Kodaka returned on January 6, 2019, losing to Naoki Tanizaki. He formed the Sento Minzoku stable with Ryuichi Sekine and Daiki Shimomura to feud with Sparky and Ganbare☆Pro Wrestling; their gimmick takes inspiration from Dragon Ball Z with each member growing a tail to signify their power. Following an unsuccessful BJW Deathmatch Heavyweight Championship challenge against Masaya Takahashi on January 27, Kodaka entered the 2019 Ikkitousen Deathmatch Survivor which began on February 28. After losing his first two tournament matches, he rallied and finished top of Block A with tie breaker wins over Abdullah Kobayashi and Jimmy Havoc. The Sento Minzoku vs Ganbare☆Pro Wrestling came to a close when Kodaka defeated Ken Ohka on March 23. They also won the Yokohama Shopping Street 6-Man Tag Team Championship four days later. Back in BJW, Kodaka defeated Toshiyuki Sakuda in the semifinals on April 13 before going on to beat Masashi Takeda in the tournament final. On May 5, Kodaka defeated Takahashi to win the BJW Deathmatch Heavyweight Championship for a second time. As champion, he went on to win the Nagoya Lottery Tag Team Tournament with Sekine in May and the Heaven Summit Itadaki in July.

== Championships and accomplishments ==
- All Japan Pro Wrestling
  - All Asia Tag Team Championship (2 times) – with Yuko Miyamoto
- Big Japan Pro Wrestling
  - BJW Deathmatch Heavyweight Championship (2 times)
  - BJW Junior Heavyweight Championship (1 time)
  - BJW Tag Team Championship (5 times) – with Masashi Takeda (1), Yuko Miyamoto (3) and Hideyoshi Kamitani (1)
  - UWA World Trios Championship (1 time) – with Daiki Shimomura and Ryuichi Sekine
  - Yokohama Shopping Street 6-Man Tag Team Championship (1 time) – with Minoru Fujita and Ryuichi Sekine
  - Ikkitousen Deathmatch Survivor (2019)
  - Saikyo Tag League (2009) – with Masashi Takeda
  - Saikyo Tag League (2012, 2013, 2014) – with Yuko Miyamoto
- DDT Pro-Wrestling
  - DDT Extreme Championship (3 times)
  - KO-D Openweight Championship (1 time)
  - KO-D Tag Team Championship (1 time) – with Yuko Miyamoto
  - DDT Dramatic Sousenkyo (2015)
  - King of DDT Tournament (2014)
- Ganbare Pro-Wrestling
  - Spirit of Ganbare World Openweight Championship (1 time)
- Ice Ribbon
  - International Ribbon Tag Team Championship (1 time) – with Chii Tomiya
- Japan Indie Awards
  - Best Bout Award (2013) vs. Shuji Ishikawa on November 4
  - Best Unit Award (2013) – with Yuko Miyamoto
  - MVP Award (2013)
- Kaientai Dojo
  - Chiba 6 Man Tag Team Championship (1 time) – with Kengo Mashimo and Taka Michinoku
  - Independent World Junior Heavyweight Championship (1 time)
  - Strongest-K Championship (1 time)
  - Strongest-K Tag Team Championship (1 time) – with Tank Nagai
- Pro-Wrestling Basara
  - Iron Fist Tag Team Championship (2 times) – with Daiki Shimomura
  - Union Max Championship (5 times)
  - Itadaki (2019)
  - Iron Fist Tag Tournament – with Takumi Tsukamoto (2016), and Daiki Shimomura (2020)
  - Nagoya Lottery Tag Team Tournament (2019) – with Ryuichi Sekine
  - Shinjuku Chijō Saidai Budōkai Tournament (2016)
- Pro Wrestling Illustrated
  - Ranked No. 91 of the top 500 singles wrestlers in the PWI 500 in 2016
- Pro Wrestling Wave
  - Wave Tag Team Championship (1 time) – with Yuko Miyamoto
- Pro Wrestling Zero1
  - International Junior Heavyweight Championship (1 time)
  - NWA World Junior Heavyweight Championship (1 time)
  - NWA International Lightweight Tag Team Championship (2 times) – with Takumi Tsukamoto
- Style-E
  - Style-E Openweight Championship (1 time)
- Tokyo Gurentai
  - Tokyo Intercontinental Tag Team Championship (1 time) – with Yuko Miyamoto
- Toshikoshi Puroresu
  - Tenka Toitsu! Tag Tournament (2014) – with Yuko Miyamoto
- Union Pro Wrestling
  - Union Max Championship (4 times)
  - UWA World Tag Team Championship (2 times) – with Fuma (1) and Hideyoshi Kamitani (1)
